= 2005–06 Philadelphia Flyers season =

NHL hockey team season

2005–06 Philadelphia Flyers
- Division: 2nd Atlantic
- Conference: 5th Eastern
- 2005–06 record: 45–26–11
- Home record: 22–13–6
- Road record: 23–13–5
- Goals for: 267
- Goals against: 259

Team information
- General manager: Bob Clarke
- Coach: Ken Hitchcock
- Captain: Keith Primeau; Derian Hatcher (interim) (Note: Hatcher was named interim captain for the duration of Primeau's absence on January 29.)
- Alternate captains: Simon Gagne; Derian Hatcher (Oct.–Jan.); Sami Kapanen (Jan.–Apr.)
- Arena: Wachovia Center
- Average attendance: 19,653
- Minor league affiliates: Philadelphia Phantoms; Trenton Titans

Team leaders
- Goals: Simon Gagne (47)
- Assists: Peter Forsberg (56)
- Points: Simon Gagne (79)
- Penalty minutes: Donald Brashear (166)
- Plus/minus: Simon Gagne (+31)
- Wins: Antero Niittymaki (23)
- Goals against average: Robert Esche (2.97)

The 2005–06 Philadelphia Flyers season was the franchise's 39th season in the National Hockey League (NHL). The Flyers lost in the first round of the playoffs to the Buffalo Sabres in six games.

== Off-season ==
The Flyers were one of the more active teams at the resolution of the lockout. Replacing the high-profile players Tony Amonte, John LeClair and Jeremy Roenick were superstar Peter Forsberg, along with defensemen Derian Hatcher and Mike Rathje, as well as several players from the Calder Cup-winning Philadelphia Phantoms. Ultimately, the team had experienced a turnover of nearly two-thirds of the roster.

== Regular season ==
The Flyers began the season with lofty expectations. Despite being hampered by injuries prior to and during 2005–06, the Flyers lived up to those expectations in the first half of the season, reaching the top of the league standings in early January while simultaneously holding a nine-point lead in the Atlantic Division. The Deuces Wild line of Forsberg, Simon Gagne and Mike Knuble recorded 75, 79 and 65 points respectively, while Gagne scored a career high 47 goals.

However, the injuries began to accumulate and take their toll. Keith Primeau suffered a concussion on October 25 in Montreal and missed the rest of the season and the playoffs. In late January, Hatcher was named team captain for the duration of Primeau's absence. All told, the Flyers were third in the NHL with 388-man-games lost to injury, tops amongst playoff teams. The second half of the regular season was defined by a record hovering around .500, sending the Flyers on a steady slide in the standings. The Flyers fell short of an Atlantic Division title finishing second by the wins tie-breaker to the New Jersey Devils and drawing the 5th seed and a first round match-up with the Buffalo Sabres.

=== Season standings ===
Atlantic Division
No.	CR		GP	W	L	OTL	GF	GA	Pts
1	3	New Jersey Devils	82	46	27	9	242	229	101
2	5	Philadelphia Flyers	82	45	26	11	267	259	101
3	6	New York Rangers	82	44	26	12	257	215	100
4	12	New York Islanders	82	36	40	6	230	278	78
5	15	Pittsburgh Penguins	82	22	46	14	244	316	58

Eastern Conference
R		Div	GP	W	L	OTL	GF	GA	Pts
1	Z- Ottawa Senators	NE	82	52	21	9	314	211	113
2	Y- Carolina Hurricanes	SE	82	52	22	8	294	260	112
3	Y- New Jersey Devils	AT	82	46	27	9	242	229	101
4	X- Buffalo Sabres	NE	82	52	24	6	242	239	110
5	X- Philadelphia Flyers	AT	82	45	26	11	267	259	101
6	X- New York Rangers	AT	82	44	26	12	257	215	100
7	X- Montreal Canadiens	NE	82	42	31	9	243	247	93
8	X- Tampa Bay Lightning	SE	82	43	33	6	252	260	92
8.5
9	Toronto Maple Leafs	NE	82	41	33	8	257	270	90
10	Atlanta Thrashers	SE	82	41	33	8	281	275	90
11	Florida Panthers	SE	82	37	34	11	240	257	85
12	New York Islanders	AT	82	36	40	6	230	278	78
13	Boston Bruins	NE	82	29	37	16	230	266	74
14	Washington Capitals	SE	82	29	41	12	237	306	70
15	Pittsburgh Penguins	AT	82	22	46	14	244	316	58

Divisions: AT – Atlantic, NE – Northeast, SE – Southeast

Z – Clinched conference; Y – Clinched division; X – Clinched playoff spot

== Playoffs ==
The Flyers lost to Buffalo in six games in the Eastern Conference quarterfinals.

== Schedule and results ==
=== Preseason ===
2005 preseason
Preseason: 6–1–0 (home: 5–0–0; road: 1–1–0)

Game	Date	Score	Opponent	Decision	Record	Recap
1^{[a]}	September 17	8–6	Atlanta Thrashers	Esche	1–0–0	W
2^{[b]}	September 21	2–1	New York Islanders	Niittymaki	2–0–0	W
3	September 24	5–2	Washington Capitals	Esche	3–0–0	W
4	September 27	5–3	New York Islanders	Niittymaki	4–0–0	W
5	September 29	3–2	New Jersey Devils	Esche	5–0–0	W
6	September 30	3–5	@ New Jersey Devils	Niittymaki	5–1–0	L
7	October 1	7–6 SO	@ Washington Capitals	Niittymaki	6–1–0	W
Notes:^{a} Game played at John Labatt Centre in London, Ontario.^{b} Game played at Sovereign Bank Arena in Trenton, New Jersey.

Legend: W Win (2 points) L Loss (0 points) OTL Overtime/shootout loss (1 point)

=== Regular season ===
2005–06 regular season
October: 6–3–1, 13 points (home: 4–1–0; road: 2–3–1)

Game	Date	Score	Opponent	Decision	Attendance	Record	Points	Recap
1	October 5	3–5	New York Rangers	Esche	19,821	0–1–0	0	L
2	October 7	5–2	New Jersey Devils	Niittymaki	19,590	1–1–0	2	W
3	October 11	2–4	@ Toronto Maple Leafs	Esche	19,391	1–2–0	2	L
4	October 14	6–5 OT	Pittsburgh Penguins	Niittymaki	19,566	2–2–0	4	W
5	October 15	5–1	New York Islanders	Esche	19,543	3–2–0	6	W
6	October 22	5–2	@ Toronto Maple Leafs	Esche	19,391	4–2–0	8	W
7	October 25	2–3 OT	@ Montreal Canadiens	Esche	21,273	4–2–1	9	OTL
8	October 27	5–4 OT	Florida Panthers	Esche	19,533	5–2–1	11	W
9	October 28	6–8	@ Carolina Hurricanes	Niittymaki	18,165	5–3–1	11	L
10	October 30	5–3	@ Ottawa Senators	Esche	19,335	6–3–1	13	W

November: 9–3–2, 20 points (home: 6–2–2; road: 3–1–0)

Game	Date	Score	Opponent	Decision	Attendance	Record	Points	Recap
11	November 3	8–1	Washington Capitals	Esche	19,253	7–3–1	15	W
12	November 5	4–3	Atlanta Thrashers	Esche	19,587	8–3–1	17	W
13	November 8	4–3 OT	Boston Bruins	Esche	19,587	9–3–1	19	W
14	November 10	3–2	New York Islanders	Niittymaki	19,601	10–3–1	21	W
15	November 12	5–4	Florida Panthers	Esche	19,654	11–3–1	23	W
16	November 14	2–5	@ Tampa Bay Lightning	Esche	20,020	11–4–1	23	L
17	November 16	2–3 OT	Pittsburgh Penguins	Niittymaki	19,687	11–4–2	24	OTL
18	November 18	5–6 OT	Atlanta Thrashers	Esche	19,533	11–4–3	25	OTL
19	November 19	6–3	@ Pittsburgh Penguins	Niittymaki	17,132	12–4–3	27	W
20	November 22	2–4	Tampa Bay Lightning	Esche	19,567	12–5–3	27	L
21	November 25	5–3	@ Boston Bruins	Niittymaki	17,565	13–5–3	29	W
22	November 26	2–4	New York Islanders	Niittymaki	19,780	13–6–3	29	L
23	November 29	4–2	@ New York Islanders	Esche	12,354	14–6–3	31	W
24	November 30	2–1	New Jersey Devils	Esche	19,573	15–6–3	33	W

December: 9–2–3, 21 points (home: 3–2–1; road: 6–0–2)

Game	Date	Score	Opponent	Decision	Attendance	Record	Points	Recap
25	December 3	3–4 SO	@ Nashville Predators	Niittymaki	16,116	15–6–4	34	OTL
26	December 6	1–0 SO	Calgary Flames	Niittymaki	19,542	16–6–4	36	W
27	December 8	2–3	Edmonton Oilers	Niittymaki	19,411	16–7–4	36	L
28	December 10	3–2	Minnesota Wild	Niittymaki	19,592	17–7–4	38	W
29	December 13	3–1	@ Columbus Blue Jackets	Esche	16,263	18–7–4	40	W
30	December 15	4–5	Vancouver Canucks	Esche	19,549	18–8–4	40	L
31	December 17	5–2	@ St. Louis Blues	Niittymaki	15,299	19–8–4	42	W
32	December 19	1–2 SO	Buffalo Sabres	Niittymaki	19,572	19–8–5	43	OTL
33	December 22	4–3	Ottawa Senators	Niittymaki	19,817	20–8–5	45	W
34	December 23	5–4	@ Pittsburgh Penguins	Niittymaki	17,132	21–8–5	47	W
35	December 26	3–2 SO	@ Florida Panthers	Niittymaki	18,791	22–8–5	49	W
36	December 28	4–3 OT	@ Atlanta Thrashers	Niittymaki	18,545	23–8–5	51	W
37	December 29	4–3 OT	@ Carolina Hurricanes	Niittymaki	18,730	24–8–5	53	W
38	December 31	3–4 SO	@ Washington Capitals	Niittymaki	16,492	24–8–6	54	OTL

January: 7–5–2, 16 points (home: 1–3–2; road: 6–2–0)

Game	Date	Score	Opponent	Decision	Attendance	Record	Points	Recap
39	January 2	1–0	@ Boston Bruins	Niittymaki	16,980	25–8–6	56	W
40	January 5	4–3 OT	@ New York Rangers	Niittymaki	18,200	26–8–6	58	W
41	January 6	3–1	@ Washington Capitals	Niittymaki	16,876	27–8–6	60	W
42	January 9	0–3	@ New Jersey Devils	Niittymaki	16,015	27–9–6	60	L
43	January 11	5–2	@ Chicago Blackhawks	Niittymaki	12,003	28–9–6	62	W
44	January 12	3–6	@ Detroit Red Wings	Niittymaki	20,066	28–10–6	62	L
45	January 14	3–4 OT	Colorado Avalanche	Niittymaki	19,953	28–10–7	63	OTL
46	January 17	3–4 SO	Carolina Hurricanes	Niittymaki	19,572	28–10–8	64	OTL
47	January 19	2–5	Boston Bruins	Niittymaki	19,618	28–11–8	64	L
48	January 21	2–1	@ Pittsburgh Penguins	Esche	17,132	29–11–8	66	W
49	January 23	4–2	Pittsburgh Penguins	Niittymaki	19,726	30–11–8	68	W
50	January 25	3–5	Montreal Canadiens	Esche	19,711	30–12–8	68	L
51	January 28	0–6	Tampa Bay Lightning	Niittymaki	19,789	30–13–8	68	L
52	January 30	3–2 OT	@ New York Rangers	Esche	18,200	31–13–8	70	W

February: 2–3–1, 5 points (home: 2–0–1; road: 0–3–0)

Game	Date	Score	Opponent	Decision	Attendance	Record	Points	Recap
53	February 2	2–4	@ Buffalo Sabres	Esche	18,690	31–14–8	70	L
54	February 4	3–4 OT	New York Rangers	Esche	19,801	31–14–9	71	OTL
55	February 5	0–5	@ Montreal Canadiens	Niittymaki	21,273	31–15–9	71	L
56	February 8	5–2	New York Islanders	Esche	19,603	32–15–9	73	W
57	February 10	5–4	Washington Capitals	Esche	19,692	33–15–9	75	W
58	February 11	2–3	@ Ottawa Senators	Niittymaki	19,834	33–16–9	75	L

March: 7–6–1, 15 points (home: 4–3–0; road: 3–4–1)

Game	Date	Score	Opponent	Decision	Attendance	Record	Points	Recap
59	March 1	1–2 SO	@ New Jersey Devils	Esche	16,067	33–16–10	76	OTL
60	March 2	1–6	New York Rangers	Esche	19,682	33–17–10	76	L
61	March 4	2–4	@ New York Islanders	Niittymaki	16,234	33–18–10	76	L
62	March 6	5–4 SO	Montreal Canadiens	Esche	19,561	34–18–10	78	W
63	March 8	3–2 SO	Carolina Hurricanes	Niittymaki	19,644	35–18–10	80	W
64	March 11	5–6	Buffalo Sabres	Niittymaki	19,717	35–19–10	80	L
65	March 12	0–2	@ Pittsburgh Penguins	Esche	14,904	35–20–10	80	L
66	March 15	4–0	@ Florida Panthers	Esche	15,614	36–20–10	82	W
67	March 17	3–6	@ Tampa Bay Lightning	Esche	20,834	36–21–10	82	L
68	March 18	4–2	@ Atlanta Thrashers	Niittymaki	18,612	37–21–10	84	W
69	March 21	2–1	New Jersey Devils	Niittymaki	19,777	38–21–10	86	W
70	March 22	6–3	@ New York Rangers	Esche	18,200	39–21–10	88	W
71	March 25	6–3	Ottawa Senators	Niittymaki	19,869	40–21–10	90	W
72	March 28	2–3	Toronto Maple Leafs	Niittymaki	19,651	40–22–10	90	L

April: 5–4–1, 11 points (home: 2–2–0; road: 3–2–1)

Game	Date	Score	Opponent	Decision	Attendance	Record	Points	Recap
73	April 1	1–4	New Jersey Devils	Niittymaki	19,710	40–23–10	90	L
74	April 2	4–1	@ New York Islanders	Esche	12,125	41–23–10	92	W
75	April 4	2–3 SO	@ New York Rangers	Esche	18,200	41–23–11	93	OTL
76	April 7	4–2	@ Buffalo Sabres	Esche	16,909	42–23–11	95	W
77	April 8	2–5	Toronto Maple Leafs	Niittymaki	19,783	42–24–11	95	L
78	April 11	4–3	Pittsburgh Penguins	Esche	19,756	43–24–11	97	W
79	April 13	1–4	@ New Jersey Devils	Esche	15,628	43–25–11	97	L
80	April 15	4–1	New York Rangers	Niittymaki	19,810	44–25–11	99	W
81	April 16	1–5	@ New Jersey Devils	Esche	15,981	44–26–11	99	L
82	April 18	4–1	@ New York Islanders	Esche	10,524	45–26–11	101	W

Legend: W Win (2 points) L Loss (0 points) OTL Overtime/shootout loss (1 point)

=== Playoffs ===
2006 Stanley Cup playoffs
Eastern Conference quarterfinals vs. Buffalo Sabres – Sabres win 4–2

Game	Date	Score	Opponent	Decision	Attendance	Series	Recap
1	April 22	2–3 2OT	@ Buffalo Sabres	Esche	18,690	Sabres lead 1–0	L
2	April 24	2–8	@ Buffalo Sabres	Esche	18,690	Sabres lead 2–0	L
3	April 26	4–2	Buffalo Sabres	Esche	19,984	Sabres lead 2–1	W
4	April 28	5–4	Buffalo Sabres	Esche	20,092	Series tied 2–2	W
5	April 30	0–3	@ Buffalo Sabres	Esche	18,690	Sabres lead 3–2	L
6	May 2	1–7	Buffalo Sabres	Esche	19,967	Sabres win 4–2	L

Legend: W Win L Loss

== Player statistics ==
=== Scoring ===
- Position abbreviations: C = Center; D = Defense; G = Goaltender; LW = Left wing; RW = Right wing
- † = Joined team via a transaction (e.g., trade, waivers, signing) during the season. Stats reflect time with the Flyers only.
- ‡ = Left team via a transaction (e.g., trade, waivers, release) during the season. Stats reflect time with the Flyers only.

No.	Player	Pos	Regular season						Playoffs					
No.	Player	Pos	GP	G	A	Pts	+/-	PIM	GP	G	A	Pts	+/-	PIM
12	Simon Gagne	LW	72	47	32	79	31	38	6	3	1	4	2	2
21	Peter Forsberg	C	60	19	56	75	21	46	6	4	4	8	2	6
22	Mike Knuble	RW	82	34	31	65	25	80	6	1	3	4	1	8
44	Joni Pitkanen	D	58	13	33	46	22	78	6	0	2	2	0	2
26	Michal Handzus	C	73	11	33	44	−2	38	6	0	2	2	−2	2
17	Jeff Carter	C	81	23	19	42	10	40	6	0	0	0	−4	10
20	R. J. Umberger	C	73	20	18	38	9	18	5	1	0	1	−3	2
24	Sami Kapanen	RW	58	12	22	34	−9	12	6	0	0	0	−4	2
18	Mike Richards	C	79	11	23	34	6	65	6	0	1	1	−5	0
34	Freddy Meyer	D	57	6	21	27	10	33	6	0	1	1	−5	8
5	Kim Johnsson	D	47	6	19	25	5	34	—	—	—	—	—	—
37	Eric Desjardins	D	45	4	20	24	3	56	6	1	3	4	−3	6
3	Mike Rathje	D	79	3	21	24	22	46	6	0	0	0	−1	6
2	Derian Hatcher	D	77	4	13	17	2	93	6	0	2	2	−4	10
49	Brian Savage	LW	66	9	5	14	−18	28	6	1	0	1	−4	4
19	Branko Radivojevic	RW	64	8	6	14	−6	44	5	1	0	1	−1	0
11	Jon Sim‡	RW	39	7	7	14	−6	28	—	—	—	—	—	—
93	Petr Nedved†	C	28	5	9	14	−8	36	6	2	0	2	−4	8
15	Niko Dimitrakos†	RW	9	5	4	9	4	6	5	0	0	0	−2	2
87	Donald Brashear	LW	76	4	5	9	−2	166	1	0	0	0	0	0
9	Patrick Sharp‡	C	22	5	3	8	4	10	—	—	—	—	—	—
55	Ben Eager	LW	25	3	5	8	0	18	2	0	0	0	−4	26
29	Randy Jones	D	28	0	8	8	−6	16	—	—	—	—	—	—
28	Dennis Seidenberg‡	D	24	2	5	7	−4	4	—	—	—	—	—	—
25	Keith Primeau	C	9	1	6	7	0	6	—	—	—	—	—	—
27	Turner Stevenson	RW	31	1	3	4	−2	45	—	—	—	—	—	—
6	Chris Therien	D	47	0	4	4	−7	34	—	—	—	—	—	—
42	Robert Esche	G	40	0	3	3		4	6	0	0	0		2
23	Matt Ellison†	RW	5	0	1	1	2	2	—	—	—	—	—	—
30	Antero Niittymaki	G	46	0	1	1		0	2	0	0	0		0
11	Ryan Potulny	C	2	0	1	1	1	0	—	—	—	—	—	—
14	Ryan Ready	LW	7	0	1	1	0	0	—	—	—	—	—	—
15	Eric Chouinard‡	C	1	0	0	0	0	2	—	—	—	—	—	—
23	Denis Gauthier†	D	17	0	0	0	6	37	6	0	1	1	−5	19
46	Josh Gratton‡	LW	3	0	0	0	0	14	—	—	—	—	—	—
36	Pat Kavanagh	RW	8	0	0	0	−2	2	—	—	—	—	—	—
41	Alexandre Picard	D	6	0	0	0	−2	45	—	—	—	—	—	—
28	David Printz	D	1	0	0	0	0	0	—	—	—	—	—	—
40	Stefan Ruzicka	RW	1	0	0	0	0	2	—	—	—	—	—	—
43	Wade Skolney	D	1	0	0	0	0	2	—	—	—	—	—	—

=== Goaltending ===
No.	Player	Regular season											Playoffs									
No.	Player	GP	GS	W	L	OT	SA	GA	GAA	SV%	SO	TOI	GP	GS	W	L	SA	GA	GAA	SV%	SO	TOI
30	Antero Niittymaki	46	42	23	15	6	1266	133	2.97	.895	2	2,690	2	0	0	0	29	5	4.13	.828	0	73
42	Robert Esche	40	40	22	11	5	1099	113	2.97	.897	1	2,286	6	6	2	4	176	22	4.20	.875	0	314

== Awards and records ==
=== Awards ===
Type	Award/honor	Recipient	Ref
League (in-season)	NHL Defensive Player of the Week	Antero Niittymaki (January 9) (Note: Co-winner with Colorado Avalanche's David Aebischer)	
Team	Barry Ashbee Trophy	Joni Pitkanen	
Team	Bobby Clarke Trophy	Simon Gagne	
Team	Pelle Lindbergh Memorial Trophy	Joni Pitkanen	
Team	Toyota Cup	Simon Gagne	
Team	Yanick Dupre Memorial Class Guy Award	Peter Forsberg	

=== Records ===
Among the team records set during the 2005–06 season was Simon Gagne taking seven seconds to score the fastest overtime goal in team history on January 6 against the New York Rangers. On February 8, rookie Mike Richards tied the team record for most shorthanded goals scored in a single game (2).

=== Milestones ===
Milestone	Player	Date	Ref
First game	Jeff Carter	October 5, 2005	
First game	Mike Richards	October 5, 2005	
First game	Wade Skolney	October 11, 2005	
First game	R. J. Umberger	October 30, 2005	
First game	Ryan Ready	November 29, 2005	
First game	Ben Eager	November 30, 2005	
First game	Josh Gratton	December 15, 2005	
First game	Alexandre Picard	January 23, 2006	
First game	Stefan Ruzicka	February 8, 2006	
First game	Ryan Potulny	April 7, 2006	
First game	David Printz	April 11, 2006	

== Transactions ==
The Flyers were involved in the following transactions from February 17, 2005, the day after the 2004–05 season was officially canceled, through June 19, 2006, the day of the deciding game of the 2006 Stanley Cup Final.

=== Trades ===
Date	Details		Ref
July 29, 2005	To Philadelphia Flyers: 2nd-round pick in 2005	To Anaheim Mighty Ducks: Todd Fedoruk	
July 30, 2005	To Philadelphia Flyers: 1st-round pick in 2005; 2nd-round pick in 2006	To Florida Panthers: 1st-round pick in 2005	
July 30, 2005	To Philadelphia Flyers: Columbus' 4th-round pick in 2005; 2nd-round pick in 2006	To Phoenix Coyotes: Anaheim's 2nd-round pick in 2005	
July 30, 2005	To Philadelphia Flyers: 2nd-round pick in 2006	To Tampa Bay Lightning: Dallas' 3rd-round pick in 2005; 4th-round pick in 2005	
August 2, 2005	To Philadelphia Flyers: 3rd-round pick in 2006	To Nashville Predators: Danny Markov	
August 4, 2005	To Philadelphia Flyers: Future considerations	To Los Angeles Kings: Jeremy Roenick; Nashville's 3rd-round pick in 2006	
December 5, 2005	To Philadelphia Flyers: Matt Ellison; 3rd-round pick in 2006	To Chicago Blackhawks: Eric Meloche; Patrick Sharp	
December 28, 2005	To Philadelphia Flyers: Kiel McLeod	To Phoenix Coyotes: Eric Chouinard	
January 20, 2006	To Philadelphia Flyers: Petr Nedved; Option to switch 4th-round picks in 2006 (Note: Option exercised.); Option to switch 3rd-round picks in 2007 (Note: Option not exercised.)	To Phoenix Coyotes: Dennis Seidenberg	
January 23, 2006	To Philadelphia Flyers: 6th-round pick in 2007	To Florida Panthers: Jon Sim	
March 9, 2006	To Philadelphia Flyers: Denis Gauthier	To Phoenix Coyotes: Josh Gratton; Florida's 2nd-round pick in 2006; Tampa Bay's 2nd-round pick in 2006	
March 9, 2006	To Philadelphia Flyers: Niko Dimitrakos	To San Jose Sharks: 3rd-round pick in 2006	
April 21, 2006 (Note: The Flyers received the draft pick as compensation for the Kings hiring Lombardi as their general manager. Lombardi served as a Western Conference scout with the Flyers.)	To Philadelphia Flyers: 2nd-round pick in 2006	To Los Angeles Kings: Dean Lombardi	

=== Players acquired ===
Date	Player	Former team	Term	Via	Ref
August 2, 2005	Derian Hatcher	Detroit Red Wings	4-year	Free agency	
August 2, 2005	Mike Rathje	San Jose Sharks	5-year	Free agency	
August 2, 2005	Jon Sim	Phoenix Coyotes	1-year	Free agency	
August 2, 2005	Chris Therien	Dallas Stars	1-year	Free agency	
August 3, 2005	Peter Forsberg	Colorado Avalanche	2-year	Free agency	
August 22, 2005	Eric Chouinard	Minnesota Wild	1-year	Free agency	
August 22, 2005	Pat Kavanagh	Ottawa Senators	1-year	Free agency	
August 22, 2005	Jamie Storr	Springfield Falcons (AHL)	1-year	Free agency	
August 23, 2005	Riley Cote	Philadelphia Phantoms (AHL)	2-year	Free agency	
September 15, 2005	Brian Savage	Phoenix Coyotes	1-year	Free agency	
April 16, 2006	Scott Munroe	University of Alabama-Huntsville (CHA)	1-year	Free agency	
June 15, 2006	Marty Murray	Hannover Scorpions (DEL)	1-year	Free agency	

=== Players lost ===
Date	Player	New team	Via (Note: In parentheses is the player's free agency group on August 1 if applicable.)	Ref
July 13, 2005	Neil Little	Espoo Blues (Liiga)	Free agency (VI)	
July 22, 2005	Nick Deschenes	ESV Kaufbeuren (ESBG)	Free agency (UFA)	
July 23, 2005	Tony Amonte	Calgary Flames (Note: Amonte signed with Calgary on August 2.)	Compliance buyout	
July 23, 2005	John LeClair	Pittsburgh Penguins (Note: LeClair signed with Pittsburgh on August 15.)	Compliance buyout	
July 24, 2005	Marcus Ragnarsson	Almtuna IS (Allsvenskan)	Free agency (III) (Note: Ragnarsson retired from the NHL.)	
July 25, 2005	Mattias Timander	Modo Hockey (SHL)	Free agency (Note: Philadelphia retained Timander's NHL rights through the end of the 2005–06 season.)	
August 1, 2005	Claude Lapointe (Note: Lapointe was inactive during the 2005–06 season.)		Contract expiration (III)	
August 9, 2005	Sean Burke	Tampa Bay Lightning	Free agency (III)	
August 12, 2005	Boyd Kane	Washington Capitals	Free agency (VI)	
August 23, 2005	Jeff Smith	Manitoba Moose (AHL)	Free agency (UFA)	
September 2, 2005	Radovan Somik	Severstal Cherepovets (RSL)	Free agency (UFA)	
September 14, 2005	Brent Robinson	Rogle BK (Allsvenskan)	Free agency	
September 29, 2005	Peter White	HIFK (Liiga)	Free agency (UFA)	
May 19, 2006	Jamie Storr	DEG Metro Stars (DEL)	Free agency	

=== Signings ===
Date	Player	Term	Contract type	Ref
July 27, 2005	Jeff Carter	3-year	Entry-level	
July 27, 2005	Triston Grant	3-year	Entry-level	
July 27, 2005	Alexandre Picard	3-year	Entry-level	
July 27, 2005	Mike Richards	3-year	Entry-level	
July 29, 2005	Rejean Beauchemin		Entry-level	
July 29, 2005	Stefan Ruzicka		Entry-level	
August 9, 2005	Simon Gagne	1-year	Re-signing	
August 9, 2005	Kim Johnsson	1-year	Re-signing	
August 9, 2005	Branko Radivojevic	1-year	Re-signing	
August 9, 2005	Patrick Sharp	1-year	Re-signing	
August 10, 2005	Robert Esche	2-year	Re-signing	
August 10, 2005	Dennis Seidenberg	1-year	Re-signing	
August 22, 2005	Ryan Ready	1-year	Re-signing	
February 3, 2006	Freddy Meyer	2-year	Extension	
February 7, 2006	Randy Jones	2-year	Extension	
March 23, 2006	Denis Gauthier	3-year	Extension	
March 29, 2006	Ryan Potulny	2-year	Entry-level	
April 27, 2006	Gino Pisellini		Entry-level	
May 30, 2006	Frederik Cabana	3-year	Entry-level	
May 30, 2006	Steve Downie	3-year	Entry-level	
May 30, 2006	Jussi Timonen	2-year	Entry-level	

== Draft picks ==
Philadelphia's picks at the 2005 NHL entry draft, which was held at the Westin Hotel Ottawa in Ottawa, Ontario on July 30, 2005. The Flyers traded their originally allotted second, third, and fourth-round picks in three separate trades.

Round	Pick	Player	Position	Nationality	Team (league)	Notes
1	29	Steve Downie	Right wing	Canada	Windsor Spitfires (OHL)	(Note: The Flyers traded their first-round pick, 20th overall, to the Florida Panthers for the Panthers' first-round pick, 29th overall, and the Panthers' 2006 second-round pick on July 30, 2005.)
3	91	Oskars Bartulis	Defense	Latvia	Moncton Wildcats (QMJHL)	(Note: The Flyers traded their 2004 fifth and sixth-round picks and the San Jose Sharks' 2004 sixth-round pick to the Tampa Bay Lightning for the Lightning's third-round pick, 91st overall, on June 27, 2004.)
4	119	Jeremy Duchesne	Goaltender	Canada	Halifax Mooseheads (QMJHL)	(Note: The Flyers traded Todd Fedoruk to the Mighty Ducks of Anaheim for the Mighty Ducks' second-round pick, 59th overall, on July 27, 2005. The Flyers traded the Mighty Ducks' pick to the Phoenix Coyotes for the Columbus Blue Jackets' fourth-round pick, 119th overall, and the Coyotes' 2006 second-round pick on July 30, 2005.)
5	152	Josh Beaulieu	Center	Canada	London Knights (OHL)	
6	174	John Flatters	Defense	Canada	Red Deer Rebels (WHL)	
7	215	Matt Clackson	Right wing	Canada	Chicago Steel (USHL)	

== Farm teams ==
The Flyers were affiliated with the Philadelphia Phantoms of the AHL and the Trenton Titans of the ECHL.
