= 2005–06 New York Rangers season =

NHL hockey team season

2005–06 New York Rangers
- Division: 3rd Atlantic
- Conference: 6th Eastern
- 2005–06 record: 44–26–12
- Home record: 25–10–6
- Road record: 19–16–6
- Goals for: 257
- Goals against: 215

Team information
- General manager: Glen Sather
- Coach: Tom Renney
- Captain: Vacant
- Alternate captains: Jaromir Jagr; Darius Kasparaitis; Steve Rucchin
- Arena: Madison Square Garden
- Average attendance: 18,142 (99.7%)
- Minor league affiliates: Hartford Wolf Pack; Charlotte Checkers

Team leaders
- Goals: Jaromir Jagr (54)
- Assists: Jaromir Jagr (69)
- Points: Jaromir Jagr (123)
- Penalty minutes: Darius Kasparaitis (97)
- Plus/minus: Michal Rozsival (+35)
- Wins: Henrik Lundqvist (30)
- Goals against average: Henrik Lundqvist (2.24)

The 2005–06 New York Rangers season was the franchise's 79th season of play and their 80th season overall. It marked a resurgence for the Rangers, with the team finishing the season having recorded 100 points, the sixth time in franchise history that the team had reached the 100-point plateau and their highest point total since their 1993–94 championship season, and a return to the playoffs for the first time since 1996–97. Jaromir Jagr also broke several Rangers single-season records including goals (54), points (123), power-play goals (24) and shots on goal (368). The Rangers missed out on winning the Atlantic Division on the last day of the regular season when the Devils defeated the Montreal Canadiens and the Rangers lost to the Ottawa Senators. The Rangers qualified for the playoffs as the sixth seed but were swept by their rivals the New Jersey Devils in the first round.

== Regular season ==
- October 17, 2005 – Henrik Lundqvist becomes the first Rangers rookie goaltender to record a shutout since John Vanbiesbrouck in the 1984–85 season, in a 4-0 Rangers win at home over the Florida Panthers.
- March 11, 2006 – The New York Rangers played the Montreal Canadiens at the Bell Centre in Montreal. The pre-game festivities involved the jersey retirement for former Canadien and Ranger player Bernie Geoffrion.
- March 29, 2006 – Jaromir Jagr records 4 assists, accumulating 113 points for the season and breaking the club single season points record of 109, previously held by Jean Ratelle, (1972–73). Jagr would finish the season with 123 points, the 3rd best total of his illustrious career.
- March 29, 2006 – Henrik Lundqvist sets a franchise record for rookie goaltenders with his 30th win of the season, in a 5–1 win over the Islanders.
- April 8, 2006 – Jaromir Jagr records a goal and three assists, accumulating 53 goals for the season and breaking the club single season goal scoring record of 52, previously held by Adam Graves, (1993–94). Jagr would finish the season with 54 goals, the second best total of his career.
- April 8, 2006 – The Rangers beat the Boston Bruins 4–3 in overtime, capturing their 100th point in their final victory of the season.

=== Season standings ===
Atlantic Division
No.	CR		GP	W	L	OTL	GF	GA	Pts
1	3	New Jersey Devils	82	46	27	9	242	229	101
2	5	Philadelphia Flyers	82	45	26	11	267	259	101
3	6	New York Rangers	82	44	26	12	257	215	100
4	12	New York Islanders	82	36	40	6	230	278	78
5	15	Pittsburgh Penguins	82	22	46	14	244	316	58

Eastern Conference
R		Div	GP	W	L	OTL	GF	GA	Pts
1	Z- Ottawa Senators	NE	82	52	21	9	314	211	113
2	Y- Carolina Hurricanes	SE	82	52	22	8	294	260	112
3	Y- New Jersey Devils	AT	82	46	27	9	242	229	101
4	X- Buffalo Sabres	NE	82	52	24	6	242	239	110
5	X- Philadelphia Flyers	AT	82	45	26	11	267	259	101
6	X- New York Rangers	AT	82	44	26	12	257	215	100
7	X- Montreal Canadiens	NE	82	42	31	9	243	247	93
8	X- Tampa Bay Lightning	SE	82	43	33	6	252	260	92
8.5
9	Toronto Maple Leafs	NE	82	41	33	8	257	270	90
10	Atlanta Thrashers	SE	82	41	33	8	281	275	90
11	Florida Panthers	SE	82	37	34	11	240	257	85
12	New York Islanders	AT	82	36	40	6	230	278	78
13	Boston Bruins	NE	82	29	37	16	230	266	74
14	Washington Capitals	SE	82	29	41	12	237	306	70
15	Pittsburgh Penguins	AT	82	22	46	14	244	316	58

Divisions: AT – Atlantic, NE – Northeast, SE – Southeast

Z – Clinched conference; Y – Clinched division; X – Clinched playoff spot

== Playoffs ==
The Rangers qualified for the playoffs for the first time since the 1997 Stanley Cup playoffs.

== Schedule and results ==
=== Regular season ===
2005–06 regular season
October: 6–4–3 (home: 4–1–2; road: 2–3–1)

Game	Date	Opponent	Score	Record	Recap
1	October 5	@ Philadelphia Flyers	5–3	1–0–0	W
2	October 6	Montreal Canadiens	4–3 OT	1–0–1	OTL
3	October 8	@ New Jersey Devils	3–2 OT	1–0–2	OTL
4	October 10	@ Washington Capitals	3–2	1–1–2	L
5	October 13	New Jersey Devils	4–1	2–1–2	W
6	October 15	Atlanta Thrashers	5–1	3–1–2	W
7	October 17	Florida Panthers	4–0	4–1–2	W
8	October 19	New York Islanders	3–2 SO	4–1–3	OTL
9	October 20	@ New York Islanders	5–4	4–2–3	L
10	October 22	@ Buffalo Sabres	3–1	4–3–3	L
11	October 27	New York Islanders	3–1	5–3–3	W
12	October 29	@ Montreal Canadiens	5–2	6–3–3	W
13	October 31	Montreal Canadiens	4–1	6–4–3	L

November: 10–3–0 (home: 4–1–0; road: 6–2–0)

Game	Date	Opponent	Score	Record	Recap
14	November 3	@ New Jersey Devils	4–2	7–4–3	W
15	November 5	New Jersey Devils	3–2 SO	8–4–3	W
16	November 7	Pittsburgh Penguins	3–2	8–5–3	L
17	November 9	@ Florida Panthers	4–3 SO	9–5–3	W
18	November 10	@ Tampa Bay Lightning	5–2	10–5–3	W
19	November 12	@ Pittsburgh Penguins	6–1	11–5–3	W
20	November 15	@ Toronto Maple Leafs	2–1	11–6–3	L
21	November 17	@ Carolina Hurricanes	5–1	11–7–3	L
22	November 19	Carolina Hurricanes	4–3	12–7–3	W
23	November 20	Boston Bruins	3–2	13–7–3	W
24	November 22	@ Buffalo Sabres	3–2 SO	14–7–3	W
25	November 24	@ Atlanta Thrashers	6–3	15–7–3	W
26	November 26	Washington Capitals	3–2 SO	16–7–3	W

December: 6–5–2 (home: 3–3–0; road: 3–2–2)

Game	Date	Opponent	Score	Record	Recap
27	December 1	Pittsburgh Penguins	2–1	17–7–3	W
28	December 3	@ Washington Capitals	5–1	17–8–3	L
29	December 5	Minnesota Wild	3–1	18–8–3	W
30	December 7	@ Chicago Blackhawks	2–1 OT	18–8–4	OTL
31	December 8	@ Nashville Predators	5–1	19–8–4	W
32	December 10	@ St. Louis Blues	5–4 OT	20–8–4	W
33	December 13	Vancouver Canucks	3–2	20–9–4	L
34	December 18	Colorado Avalanche	2–1	20–10–4	L
35	December 20	New Jersey Devils	3–1	20–11–4	L
36	December 22	Tampa Bay Lightning	4–2	21–11–4	W
37	December 26	@ Ottawa Senators	6–2	21–12–4	L
38	December 28	@ New York Islanders	6–2	22–12–4	W
39	December 31	@ Pittsburgh Penguins	4–3 OT	22–12–5	OTL

January: 7–3–3 (home: 5–1–3; road: 2–2–0)

Game	Date	Opponent	Score	Record	Recap
40	January 3	Tampa Bay Lightning	1–0 OT	22–12–6	OTL
41	January 5	Philadelphia Flyers	4–3 OT	22–12–7	OTL
42	January 7	Florida Panthers	4–0	23–12–7	W
43	January 10	Calgary Flames	4–2	24–12–7	W
44	January 12	Edmonton Oilers	5–4 OT	25–12–7	W
45	January 14	@ Detroit Red Wings	4–3	25–13–7	L
46	January 16	@ Columbus Blue Jackets	4–3	25–14–7	L
47	January 19	@ Pittsburgh Penguins	4–2	26–14–7	W
48	January 21	@ Boston Bruins	3–2 SO	27–14–7	W
49	January 22	New Jersey Devils	3–1	28–14–7	W
50	January 24	Buffalo Sabres	2–1	28–15–7	L
51	January 28	Pittsburgh Penguins	7–1	29–15–7	W
52	January 30	Philadelphia Flyers	3–2 OT	29–15–8	OTL

February: 6–0–0 (home: 3–0–0; road: 3–0–0)

Game	Date	Opponent	Score	Record	Recap
53	February 1	Pittsburgh Penguins	3–1	30–15–8	W
54	February 2	@ New York Islanders	5–2	31–15–8	W
55	February 4	@ Philadelphia Flyers	4–3 OT	32–15–8	W
56	February 8	Ottawa Senators	5–1	33–15–8	W
57	February 10	Toronto Maple Leafs	4–2	34–15–8	W
58	February 11	@ Toronto Maple Leafs	4–2	35–15–8	W

March: 5–6–4 (home: 4–2–1; road: 1–4–3)

Game	Date	Opponent	Score	Record	Recap
59	March 2	@ Philadelphia Flyers	6–1	36–15–8	W
60	March 4	@ New Jersey Devils	2–1	36–16–8	L
61	March 6	Carolina Hurricanes	2–1	36–17–8	L
62	March 8	@ Atlanta Thrashers	3–2 SO	36–17–9	OTL
63	March 11	@ Montreal Canadiens	1–0	36–18–9	L
64	March 12	Atlanta Thrashers	3–2 OT	36–18–10	OTL
65	March 14	@ Carolina Hurricanes	5–3	36–19–10	L
66	March 16	Washington Capitals	5–4	37–19–10	W
67	March 18	Toronto Maple Leafs	5–2	38–19–10	W
68	March 20	Boston Bruins	5–2	39–19–10	W
69	March 22	Philadelphia Flyers	6–3	39–20–10	L
70	March 24	@ Florida Panthers	3–2 SO	39–20–11	OTL
71	March 25	@ Tampa Bay Lightning	4–3 SO	39–20–12	OTL
72	March 27	Buffalo Sabres	5–4 SO	40–20–12	W
73	March 29	@ New York Islanders	5–1	41–20–12	W
74	March 30	@ Ottawa Senators	4–1	41–21–12	L

April: 3–5–0 (home: 2–2–0; road: 1–3–0)

Game	Date	Opponent	Score	Record	Recap
75	April 4	Philadelphia Flyers	3–2 SO	42–21–12	W
76	April 6	New York Islanders	3–1	43–21–12	W
77	April 8	@ Boston Bruins	4–3 OT	44–21–12	W
78	April 9	@ New Jersey Devils	3–2	44–22–12	L
79	April 11	New York Islanders	3–2	44–23–12	L
80	April 13	@ Pittsburgh Penguins	5–3	44–24–12	L
81	April 15	@ Philadelphia Flyers	4–1	44–25–12	L
82	April 18	Ottawa Senators	5–1	44–26–12	L

Legend: W Win (2 points) L Loss (0 points) OTL Overtime/shootout loss (1 point)

=== Playoffs ===
2006 Stanley Cup playoffs
Eastern Conference Quarterfinals vs. (3) New Jersey Devils – Devils win 4–0

Game	Date	Opponent	Score	Attendance	Series	Recap
1	April 22	@ New Jersey Devils	1–6	19,040	Devils lead 1–0	L
2	April 24	@ New Jersey Devils	1–4	19,040	Devils lead 2–0	L
3	April 26	New Jersey Devils	0–3	18,200	Devils lead 3–0	L
4	April 29	New Jersey Devils	2–4	18,200	Devils win 4–0	L

Legend: W Win L Loss

== Player statistics ==
=== Scoring ===
- Position abbreviations: C = Center; D = Defense; G = Goaltender; LW = Left wing; RW = Right wing
- † = Joined team via a transaction (e.g., trade, waivers, signing) during the season. Stats reflect time with the Rangers only.
- ‡ = Left team via a transaction (e.g., trade, waivers, release) during the season. Stats reflect time with the Rangers only.

No.	Player	Pos	Regular season						Playoffs					
No.	Player	Pos	GP	G	A	Pts	+/-	PIM	GP	G	A	Pts	+/-	PIM
68	Jaromir Jagr	RW	82	54	69	123	34	72	3	0	1	1	0	2
92	Michael Nylander	C	81	23	56	79	31	76	4	0	1	1	−3	0
82	Martin Straka	LW	82	22	54	76	17	42	4	0	0	0	−4	2
26	Martin Rucinsky	LW	52	16	39	55	10	56	2	0	1	1	−1	2
25	Petr Prucha	LW	68	30	17	47	3	32	4	1	0	1	−3	0
20	Steve Rucchin	C	72	13	23	36	6	10	4	1	0	1	−2	0
17	Petr Sykora†	RW	40	16	15	31	5	22	4	0	0	0	−5	0
3	Michal Rozsival	D	82	5	25	30	35	90	4	0	1	1	−2	8
14	Jason Ward	RW	81	10	18	28	−4	44	1	0	0	0	0	2
51	Fedor Tyutin	D	77	6	19	25	1	58	4	0	1	1	−1	0
16	Tom Poti	D	73	3	20	23	16	70	4	0	0	0	−4	2
18	Dominic Moore	C	82	9	9	18	4	28	4	0	0	0	−1	2
8	Marek Malik	D	74	2	16	18	28	78	4	0	1	1	−2	6
10	Ville Nieminen‡	LW	48	5	12	17	10	53	—	—	—	—	—	—
81	Marcel Hossa	LW	64	10	6	16	−6	28	4	0	0	0	−1	6
24	Sandis Ozolinsh†	D	19	3	11	14	2	20	3	0	0	0	−3	6
19	Blair Betts	C	66	8	2	10	−10	24	4	1	1	2	−1	2
41	Jed Ortmeyer	RW	78	5	2	7	2	38	4	1	0	1	1	4
34	Jason Strudwick	D	65	3	4	7	−10	66	3	0	0	0	−1	0
6	Darius Kasparaitis	D	67	0	6	6	7	97	2	0	0	0	−1	0
44	Ryan Hollweg	C	52	2	3	5	−3	84	4	0	1	1	−1	19
24	Maxim Kondratiev‡	D	29	1	2	3	−2	22	—	—	—	—	—	—
38	Jarkko Immonen	C	6	2	0	2	−1	0	—	—	—	—	—	—
22	Thomas Pock	D	8	1	1	2	−3	4	—	—	—	—	—	—
30	Henrik Lundqvist	G	53	0	2	2		0	3	0	0	0		0
17	Jamie Lundmark‡	C	3	1	0	1	−2	6	—	—	—	—	—	—
21	Chad Wiseman	LW	1	0	1	1	2	4	1	0	0	0	0	2
28	Colton Orr†	RW	15	0	1	1	1	44	1	0	0	0	0	2
80	Kevin Weekes	G	32	0	1	1		4	1	0	0	0		2
15	Jeff Taffe†‡	C	2	0	0	0	0	0	—	—	—	—	—	—
39	Alexandre Giroux	LW	1	0	0	0	−1	0	—	—	—	—	—	—
17	Fedor Fedorov†	RW	3	0	0	0	0	6	—	—	—	—	—	—
40	Chris Holt	G	1	0	0	0		0	—	—	—	—	—	—
33	Bryce Lampman	D	1	0	0	0	−1	2	—	—	—	—	—	—
55	David Liffiton	D	1	0	0	0	0	2	—	—	—	—	—	—

=== Goaltending ===
No.	Player	Regular season										Playoffs								
No.	Player	GP	W	L	OT	SA	GA	GAA	SV%	SO	TOI	GP	W	L	SA	GA	GAA	SV%	SO	TOI
30	Henrik Lundqvist	53	30	12	9	1485	116	2.24	.922	2	3112	3	0	3	79	13	4.41	.835	0	177
80	Kevin Weekes	32	14	14	3	867	91	2.95	.895	0	1850	1	0	1	25	4	4.00	.840	0	60
40	Chris Holt	1	0	0	0	2	0	0.00	1.000	0	10	—	—	—	—	—	—	—	—	—

== Awards and records ==
=== Awards ===
Type	Award/honor	Recipient	Ref
League (annual)	Lester B. Pearson Award	Jaromir Jagr	
League (annual)	NHL All-Rookie Team	Henrik Lundqvist (Goaltender)	
League (annual)	NHL First All-Star Team	Jaromir Jagr (Right wing)	
League (annual)	NHL Plus-Minus Award	Michal Rozsival (Note: Shared with Wade Redden of the Ottawa Senators)	
League (in-season)	NHL Defensive Player of the Week	Henrik Lundqvist (October 31)	
League (in-season)	NHL Defensive Player of the Week	Henrik Lundqvist (January 23)	
League (in-season)	NHL Offensive Player of the Month	Jaromir Jagr (December)	
League (in-season)	NHL Offensive Player of the Month	Jaromir Jagr (March)	
League (in-season)	NHL Offensive Player of the Week	Michael Nylander (March 20)	
Team	Ceil Saidel Memorial Award	Henrik Lundqvist	
Team	Frank Boucher Trophy	Jaromir Jagr	
Team	Good Guy Award	Jaromir Jagr	
Team	Lars-Erik Sjoberg Award	Henrik Lundqvist	
Team	Players' Player Award	Jed Ortmeyer	
Team	Players' Player Award	Kevin Weekes	
Team	Rangers MVP	Jaromir Jagr	
Team	Rookie of the Year	Henrik Lundqvist	
Team	Steven McDonald Extra Effort Award	Henrik Lundqvist	

=== Milestones ===
Milestone	Player	Date	Ref
First game	Ryan Hollweg	October 5, 2005	
First game	Henrik Lundqvist	October 8, 2005	
First game	Petr Prucha	October 8, 2005	
First game	Chris Holt	December 3, 2006	
First game	Alexandre Giroux	March 25, 2006	
First game	Jarkko Immonen	April 6, 2006	
First game	David Liffiton	April 11, 2006	

== Transactions ==
The Rangers were involved in the following transactions from February 17, 2005, the day after the 2004–05 NHL season was officially cancelled, through June 19, 2006, the day of the deciding game of the 2006 Stanley Cup Finals.

=== Trades ===
Date	Details		Ref
July 30, 2005	To Atlanta Thrashers: 1st-round pick in 2005; 2nd-round pick in 2005	To New York Rangers: 1st-round pick in 2005	
July 30, 2005	To Montreal Canadiens: 2nd-round pick in 2005	To New York Rangers: 2nd-round pick in 2005; 3rd-round pick in 2005	
August 23, 2005	To Anaheim Mighty Ducks: Trevor Gillies; Conditional draft pick in 2007	To New York Rangers: Steve Rucchin	
September 30, 2005	To Montreal Canadiens: Garth Murray	To New York Rangers: Marcel Hossa	
October 7, 2005	To Vancouver Canucks: Jozef Balej; Conditional draft pick (Note: 6th-round pick in 2008)	To New York Rangers: Fedor Fedorov	
October 18, 2005	To Phoenix Coyotes: Jamie Lundmark	To New York Rangers: Jeff Taffe	
January 8, 2006	To Anaheim Mighty Ducks: Maxim Kondratiev	To New York Rangers: Petr Sykora; 4th-round pick in 2007	
January 24, 2006	To Phoenix Coyotes: Jeff Taffe	To New York Rangers: Martin Sonnenberg	
March 8, 2006	To San Jose Sharks: Ville Nieminen	To New York Rangers: 3rd-round pick in 2006	
March 9, 2006	To Anaheim Mighty Ducks: San Jose's 3rd-round pick in 2006	To New York Rangers: Sandis Ozolinsh	
June 14, 2006	To Dallas Stars: Rights to Mike Green	To New York Rangers: Conditional draft pick in 2008	

=== Players acquired ===
Date	Player	Former team	Term	Via	Ref
August 2, 2005	Marek Malik	Vancouver Canucks	3-year	Free agency	
August 2, 2005	Martin Straka	Los Angeles Kings		Free agency	
August 3, 2005	Martin Rucinsky	HC Litvínov (ELH)		Free agency	
August 4, 2005	Ville Nieminen	Calgary Flames		Free agency	
August 4, 2005	Jason Ward	Montreal Canadiens	2-year	Free agency	
August 10, 2005	Joe Rullier	Los Angeles Kings		Free agency	
August 17, 2005	Hannu Pikkarainen	HIFK (Liiga)		Free agency	
September 6, 2005	Michal Rozsival	Pittsburgh Penguins		Free agency	
November 29, 2005	Colton Orr	Boston Bruins		Waivers	

=== Players lost ===
Date	Player	New team	Via (Note: In parentheses is the player's free agency group on August 1 if applicable.)	Ref
N/A	Karel Rachunek	Lokomotiv Yaroslavl (RSL)	Free agency (II) (Note: The Rangers retained Rachunek's NHL rights and re-signed him on July 1, 2006.)	
April 18, 2005	Steve Valiquette	Lokomotiv Yaroslavl (RSL)	Free agency (VI)	
July 29, 2005	Bobby Holik	Atlanta Thrashers (Note: Holik signed with Atlanta on August 2.)	Compliance buyout	
August 1, 2005	Richard Scott (Note: Scott retired.)		Contract expiration (VI)	
August 2, 2005	Jason LaBarbera	Los Angeles Kings	Free agency (VI)	
August 8, 2005	Jason Marshall	Anaheim Mighty Ducks	Free agency (III)	
August 9, 2005	Lawrence Nycholat	Washington Capitals	Free agency (VI)	
August 12, 2005	Jeff MacMillan	Columbus Blue Jackets	Free agency (VI)	
August 31, 2005	Lucas Lawson	JYP (Liiga)	Free agency (UFA)	
September 2, 2005	Mike Dunham	Atlanta Thrashers	Free agency (III)	
September 6, 2005	Layne Ulmer	San Antonio Rampage (AHL)	Free agency (UFA)	
September 25, 2005	Dan Blackburn		Retirement (UFA)	
May 14, 2006	Rory Rawlyk	Bofors IK (Allsvenskan)	Free agency	

=== Signings ===
Date	Player	Term	Contract type	Ref
July 26, 2005	Rick Kozak		Entry-level	
July 27, 2005	Al Montoya	3-year	Entry-level	
July 29, 2005	Hugh Jessiman		Entry-level	
July 29, 2005	Henrik Lundqvist		Entry-level	
August 2, 2005	Kevin Weekes	2-year	Re-signing	
August 3, 2005	Thomas Pock		Re-signing	
August 11, 2005	Blair Betts		Re-signing	
August 15, 2005	Steve MacIntyre		Re-signing	
August 15, 2005	Tom Poti		Re-signing	
August 16, 2005	Jozef Balej		Re-signing	
August 17, 2005	Chris Holt		Entry-level	
August 17, 2005	Petr Prucha		Entry-level	
August 18, 2005	Jamie Lundmark		Re-signing	
August 18, 2005	Garth Murray		Re-signing	
August 18, 2005	Chad Wiseman		Re-signing	
August 23, 2005	Jarkko Immonen	3-year	Entry-level	
August 25, 2005	Alexandre Giroux		Re-signing	
August 25, 2005	Martin Grenier		Re-signing	
August 30, 2005	Bryce Lampman		Re-signing	
August 30, 2005	Dominic Moore		Re-signing	
September 6, 2005	Jed Ortmeyer		Re-signing	
September 6, 2005	Craig Weller		Re-signing	
September 21, 2005	Marc Staal		Entry-level	
October 3, 2005	Bruce Graham		Entry-level	
October 25, 2005	Fedor Fedorov		Re-signing	
April 12, 2006	Dane Byers		Entry-level	
April 12, 2006	Lauri Korpikoski		Entry-level	
April 12, 2006	Greg Moore		Entry-level	
April 20, 2006	Brandon Dubinsky		Entry-level	
May 11, 2006	Ryan Callahan		Entry-level	
June 15, 2006	Colton Orr		Re-signing	
June 19, 2006	Martin Richter		Re-signing	

== Draft picks ==
New York's picks at the 2005 NHL entry draft in Ottawa, Ontario, Canada at the Westin Hotel.

Round	#	Player	Position	Nationality	College/Junior/Club team (League)
1	12	Marc Staal	D	Canada	Sudbury Wolves (OHL)
2	40	Michael Sauer	D	United States	Portland Winter Hawks (WHL)
2	56	Marc-Andre Cliche	RW	Canada	Lewiston Maineiacs (QMJHL)
3	66	Brodie Dupont	C	Canada	Calgary Hitmen (WHL)
3	77	Dalyn Flatt	D	Canada	Saskatoon Blades (WHL)
4	107	Tom Pyatt	C	Canada	Saginaw Spirit (OHL)
5	147	Trevor Koverko	D	Canada	Owen Sound Attack (OHL)
6	178	Greg Beller	F	Canada	Lake of the Woods (USHS-MN)
7	211	Ryan Russell	C	Canada	Kootenay Ice (WHL)
