= 2005–06 Pittsburgh Penguins season =

NHL team season

2005–06 Pittsburgh Penguins
- Division: 5th Atlantic
- Conference: 15th Eastern
- 2005–06 record: 22–46–14
- Home record: 12–21–8
- Road record: 10–25–6
- Goals for: 244
- Goals against: 316

Team information
- General manager: Craig Patrick
- Coach: Eddie Olczyk (Oct.–Dec.); Michel Therrien (Dec.–Apr.)
- Captain: Mario Lemieux (Oct.–Jan.); Vacant (Jan.–Apr.)
- Alternate captains: Sidney Crosby (Dec.–Apr.); Sergei Gonchar; John LeClair; Mark Recchi (Oct.–Feb.); Josef Melichar
- Arena: Mellon Arena
- Average attendance: 15,804
- Minor league affiliates: Wilkes-Barre/Scranton Penguins; Wheeling Nailers

Team leaders
- Goals: Sidney Crosby (39)
- Assists: Sidney Crosby (63)
- Points: Sidney Crosby (102)
- Penalty minutes: Brooks Orpik (124)
- Plus/minus: Colby Armstrong (+15)
- Wins: Marc-Andre Fleury (13)
- Goals against average: Marc-Andre Fleury (3.25)

The 2005–06 Pittsburgh Penguins season was the team's 39th season in the National Hockey League (NHL). The season was notable for being Sidney Crosby's rookie campaign. However, Crosby's inaugural season did not improve the team, as they suffered another losing season, finishing last place in the Eastern Conference for the second year in a row with 58 points, the second worst in the NHL. The Penguins failed to qualify for the Stanley Cup playoffs for the fourth consecutive season for the first time since the 1984–85 season and the 1987–88 season. It would be the final season where they missed the Stanley Cup playoffs until 2023 and the last season they finished with a losing record until 2025.

== Regular season ==
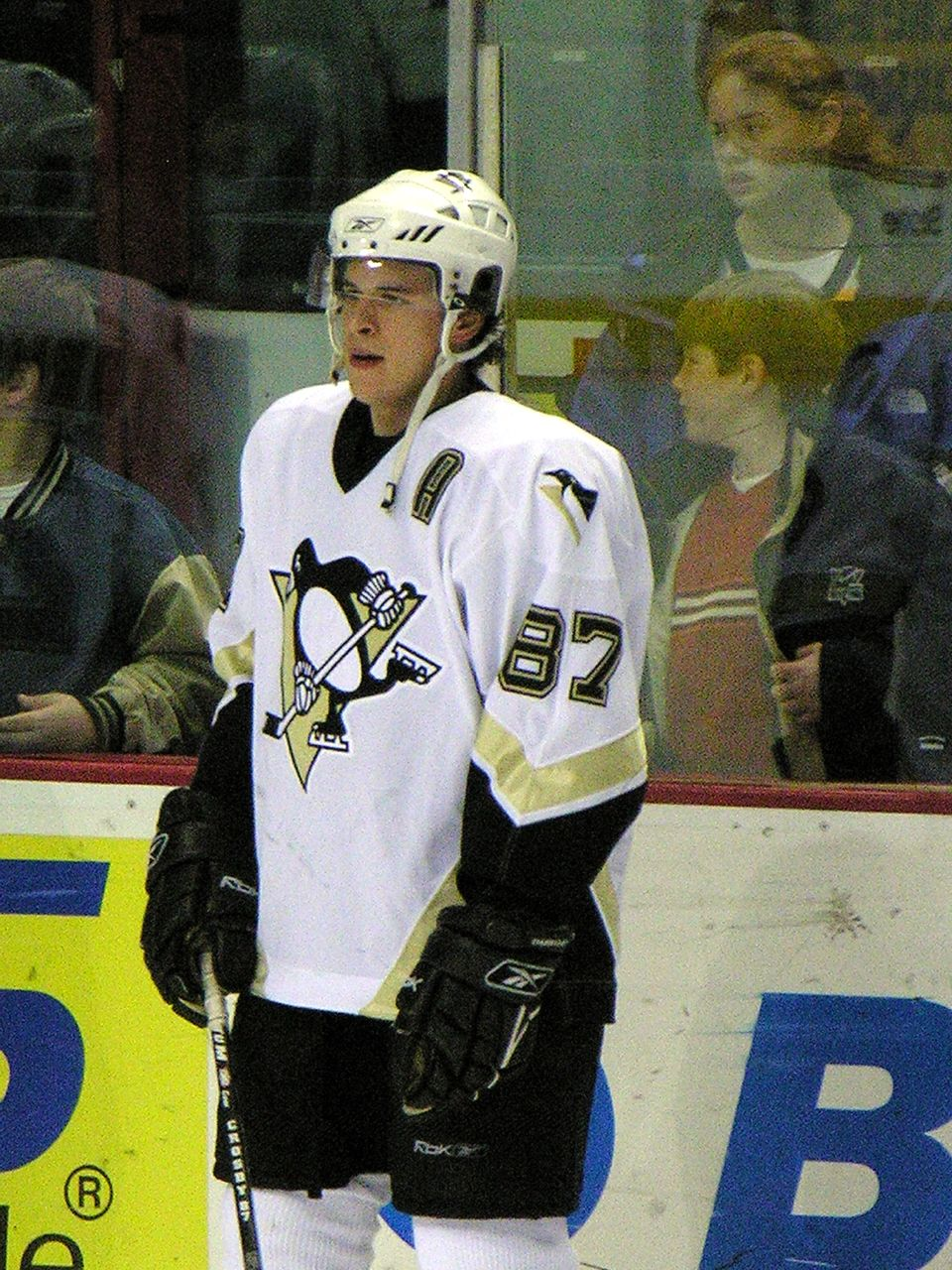
Sidney Crosby with the Penguins.

The Penguins struggled defensively, finishing 30th overall in goals allowed, with 310 (excluding 6 shootout goals allowed).

=== Sidney Crosby ===
Sidney Crosby was selected first overall in the 2005 NHL entry draft by the Penguins on July 30, 2005. Due to the labour stoppage in the previous season, the 2005 draft was conducted via a weighted lottery based on each team's playoff appearances and draft lottery victories in the last four years. This lottery system led to the draft being popularly referred to as the "Sidney Crosby Lottery" or the "Sidney Crosby Sweepstakes".

On December 16, 2005, Michel Therrien named Crosby as an alternate captain for the Penguins. The move drew criticism from some hockey pundits, including Don Cherry, who claimed that Crosby had done nothing to earn the position.

Crosby finished his rookie season with the franchise record in assists (63) and points (102) for a rookie, both of which had been previously held by Mario Lemieux. Crosby is the youngest player in the history of the NHL to score 100 points in a single season, and only the seventh rookie ever to hit the benchmark. Overall, Crosby finished sixth in the NHL scoring race and seventh in the NHL in assists. Among Canadian NHL players, he trailed only Joe Thornton and Dany Heatley. While both Crosby and Alexander Ovechkin of the Washington Capitals had impressive rookie campaigns, Crosby finished second behind Ovechkin for the Calder Memorial Trophy for NHL rookie of the year.

Through his first season, Crosby was accused by opposing players and coaches of taking dives and complaining to officials, which has been attributed to his youth. During his rookie campaign, he was second on his team and fourth among all NHL rookies in penalty minutes, and is the only rookie to accumulate both 100 points and 100 penalty minutes in a single season in NHL history. This magnified his reputation for complaining to NHL officials. Hockey analyst Kelly Hrudey compared Crosby to Gretzky, who had a similar reputation as a "whiner" in his youth, and suggested that as Crosby matured, he would mellow out and his reputation would fade.

=== Mario Lemieux ===
After the lockout concluded, Lemieux returned to the ice for the 2005–06 season. Hopes for the Penguins were high due to the salary cap and revenue sharing, which enabled the team to compete in the market for several star players. Another reason for optimism was the Penguins winning the lottery for the first draft pick, enabling them to select Sidney Crosby. Lemieux opened up his home to Crosby to help the rookie settle in Pittsburgh and Lemieux also served as Crosby's mentor.

On January 24, 2006, Lemieux announced his second and permanent retirement from professional hockey at age 40. This followed a half-season in which he struggled not only with the increased speed of the "new NHL" but also with yet another threatening physical ailment, a heart condition called atrial fibrillation that caused him to experience irregular heartbeats.

Although he had put up points at a pace that most NHL forwards would be perfectly content with (22 points in 26 games) in his last season, Lemieux still remarked, "I can no longer play at a level I was accustomed to in the past."

=== Season standings ===
Atlantic Division
No.	CR		GP	W	L	OTL	GF	GA	Pts
1	3	New Jersey Devils	82	46	27	9	242	229	101
2	5	Philadelphia Flyers	82	45	26	11	267	259	101
3	6	New York Rangers	82	44	26	12	257	215	100
4	12	New York Islanders	82	36	40	6	230	278	78
5	15	Pittsburgh Penguins	82	22	46	14	244	316	58

Eastern Conference
R		Div	GP	W	L	OTL	GF	GA	Pts
1	Z- Ottawa Senators	NE	82	52	21	9	314	211	113
2	Y- Carolina Hurricanes	SE	82	52	22	8	294	260	112
3	Y- New Jersey Devils	AT	82	46	27	9	242	229	101
4	X- Buffalo Sabres	NE	82	52	24	6	242	239	110
5	X- Philadelphia Flyers	AT	82	45	26	11	267	259	101
6	X- New York Rangers	AT	82	44	26	12	257	215	100
7	X- Montreal Canadiens	NE	82	42	31	9	243	247	93
8	X- Tampa Bay Lightning	SE	82	43	33	6	252	260	92
8.5
9	Toronto Maple Leafs	NE	82	41	33	8	257	270	90
10	Atlanta Thrashers	SE	82	41	33	8	281	275	90
11	Florida Panthers	SE	82	37	34	11	240	257	85
12	New York Islanders	AT	82	36	40	6	230	278	78
13	Boston Bruins	NE	82	29	37	16	230	266	74
14	Washington Capitals	SE	82	29	41	12	237	306	70
15	Pittsburgh Penguins	AT	82	22	46	14	244	316	58

Divisions: AT – Atlantic, NE – Northeast, SE – Southeast

Z – Clinched conference; Y – Clinched division; X – Clinched playoff spot

== Schedule and results ==
=== Preseason ===
2005 preseason
Preseason: 2–5–2 (home: 2–2–1; road: 0–3–1)

#	Date	Visitor	Score	Home	Location/Attendance	Record	Recap
1	September 19	Pittsburgh Penguins	2–3 SO	Columbus Blue Jackets	Nationwide Arena	0–0–1	OTL
2	September 21	Boston Bruins	5–4 OT	Pittsburgh Penguins	Mohegan Sun Arena at Casey Plaza	0–0–2	OTL
3	September 23	Ottawa Senators	3–0	Pittsburgh Penguins	Visions Veterans Memorial Arena	0–1–2	L
4	September 24	Ottawa Senators	6–2	Pittsburgh Penguins	Mohegan Sun Arena at Casey Plaza	0–2–2	L
5	September 25	Pittsburgh Penguins	2–3	Washington Capitals	Hersheypark Arena	0–3–2	L
6	September 27	Columbus Blue Jackets	2–7	Pittsburgh Penguins	Mellon Arena	1–3–2	W
7	September 29	Pittsburgh Penguins	1–4	Ottawa Senators	Corel Centre	1–4–2	L
8	September 30	Pittsburgh Penguins	3–4	Washington Capitals	Verizon Center	1–5–2	L
9	October 2	Washington Capitals	1–7	Pittsburgh Penguins	Mellon Arena	2–5–2	W

Legend: W Win (2 points) L Loss (0 points) OTL Overtime/shootout loss (1 point)

=== Regular season ===
2005–06 regular season
October: 1–5–5 (home: 1–3–2; road: 0–2–3), 7 Points

#	Oct	Visitor	Score	Home	Location	Record	Points	Recap
1	5	Pittsburgh Penguins	1–5	New Jersey Devils	Mellon Arena (18,101)	0–1–0	0	L
2	7	Pittsburgh Penguins	2–3 SO	Carolina Hurricanes	Mellon Arena (18,787)	0–1–1	1	OTL
3	8	Boston Bruins	7–6 OT	Pittsburgh Penguins	TD Banknorth Garden (17,132)	0–1–2	2	OTL
4	10	Pittsburgh Penguins	2–3 OT	Buffalo Sabres	Mellon Arena (12,050)	0–1–3	3	OTL
5	14	Pittsburgh Penguins	5–6 OT	Philadelphia Flyers	Mellon Arena (19,566)	0–1–4	4	OTL
6	15	Tampa Bay Lightning	3–1	Pittsburgh Penguins	Mellon Arena (17,132)	0–2–4	4	L
7	20	New Jersey Devils	6–3	Pittsburgh Penguins	Mellon Arena (16,082)	0–3–4	4	L
8	22	Pittsburgh Penguins	3–6	Boston Bruins	Mellon Arena (17,565)	0–4–4	4	L
9	25	Florida Panthers	4–3 OT	Pittsburgh Penguins	Mellon Arena (14,636)	0–4–5	5	OTL
10	27	Atlanta Thrashers	5–7	Pittsburgh Penguins	Mellon Arena (14,009)	1–4–5	7	W
11	29	Carolina Hurricanes	5–3	Pittsburgh Penguins	Mellon Arena (16,420)	1–5–5	7	L

November: 6–7–1 (home: 2–3–1; road: 4–4–0), 13 Points

#	Nov	Visitor	Score	Home	Location	Record	Points	Recap
12	1	Pittsburgh Penguins	4–3 OT	New Jersey Devils	Mellon Arena (10,134)	2–5–5	9	W
13	3	Pittsburgh Penguins	5–1	New York Islanders	Nassau Veterans Memorial Coliseum (14,415)	3–5–5	11	W
14	5	Pittsburgh Penguins	3–6	Boston Bruins	Mellon Arena (17,565)	3–6–5	11	L
15	7	Pittsburgh Penguins	3–2	New York Rangers	Mellon Arena (18,200)	4–6–5	13	W
16	9	Pittsburgh Penguins	0–5	Atlanta Thrashers	Mellon Arena (14,046)	4–7–5	13	L
17	10	Montreal Canadiens	2–3 SO	Pittsburgh Penguins	Mellon Arena (16,254)	5–7–5	15	W
18	12	New York Rangers	6–1	Pittsburgh Penguins	Madison Square Garden (IV) (17,132)	5–8–5	15	L
19	14	New York Islanders	3–2 SO	Pittsburgh Penguins	Mellon Arena (10,793)	5–8–6	16	OTL
20	16	Pittsburgh Penguins	3–2 OT	Philadelphia Flyers	Mellon Arena (19,687)	6–8–6	18	W
21	19	Philadelphia Flyers	6–3	Pittsburgh Penguins	Wachovia Center (17,132)	6–9–6	18	L
22	22	Washington Capitals	4–5	Pittsburgh Penguins	Verizon Center (16,978)	7–9–6	20	W
23	25	Pittsburgh Penguins	3–6	Florida Panthers	Mellon Arena (18,124)	7–10–6	20	L
24	27	Pittsburgh Penguins	1–4	Tampa Bay Lightning	Mellon Arena (20,218)	7–11–6	20	L
25	29	Buffalo Sabres	3–2	Pittsburgh Penguins	HSBC Arena (15,118)	7–12–6	20	L

December: 3–5–2 (home: 3–1–2; road: 0–4–0), 8 Points

#	Dec	Visitor	Score	Home	Location	Record	Points	Recap
26	1	Pittsburgh Penguins	1–2	New York Rangers	Mellon Arena (18,200)	7–13–6	20	L
27	3	Calgary Flames	3–2	Pittsburgh Penguins	Pengrowth Saddledome (16,626)	7–14–6	20	L
28	8	Minnesota Wild	5–0	Pittsburgh Penguins	Xcel Energy Center (14,627)	7–15–6	20	L
29	10	Colorado Avalanche	3–4	Pittsburgh Penguins	Mellon Arena (16,677)	8–15–6	22	W
30	12	Pittsburgh Penguins	1–3	Detroit Red Wings	Mellon Arena (20,066)	8–16–6	22	L
31	13	Pittsburgh Penguins	0–3	St. Louis Blues	Mellon Arena (14,336)	8–17–6	22	L
32	16	Buffalo Sabres	4–3 OT	Pittsburgh Penguins	HSBC Arena (16,648)	8–17–7	23	OTL
33	17	Pittsburgh Penguins	3–4	Buffalo Sabres	Mellon Arena (18,690)	8–18–7	23	L
34	23	Philadelphia Flyers	5–4	Pittsburgh Penguins	Wachovia Center (17,132)	8–19–7	23	L
35	27	Toronto Maple Leafs	3–2 OT	Pittsburgh Penguins	Air Canada Centre (17,132)	8–19–8	24	OTL
36	29	New Jersey Devils	2–6	Pittsburgh Penguins	Izod Center (17,132)	9–19–8	26	W
37	31	New York Rangers	3–4 OT	Pittsburgh Penguins	Madison Square Garden (IV) (17,132)	10–19–8	28	W

January: 2–11–2 (home: 1–5–0; road: 1–6–2), 6 Points

#	Jan	Visitor	Score	Home	Location	Record	Points	Recap
38	2	Pittsburgh Penguins	2–3 OT	Toronto Maple Leafs	Mellon Arena (19,449)	10–19–9	29	OTL
39	3	Pittsburgh Penguins	6–4	Montreal Canadiens	Mellon Arena (21,273)	11–19–9	31	W
40	6	Pittsburgh Penguins	4–6	Atlanta Thrashers	Mellon Arena (17,209)	11–20–9	31	L
41	7	Atlanta Thrashers	4–3	Pittsburgh Penguins	Philips Arena (17,132)	11–21–9	31	L
42	10	Edmonton Oilers	3–1	Pittsburgh Penguins	Rexall Place (14,905)	11–22–9	31	L
43	11	Pittsburgh Penguins	1–6	Columbus Blue Jackets	Mellon Arena (18,136)	11–23–9	31	L
44	13	Pittsburgh Penguins	1–4	Chicago Blackhawks	Mellon Arena (20,541)	11–24–9	31	L
45	15	Pittsburgh Penguins	4–5	Nashville Predators	Mellon Arena (17,113)	11–25–9	31	L
46	16	Vancouver Canucks	4–2	Pittsburgh Penguins	Mellon Arena (15,681)	11–26–9	31	L
47	19	New York Rangers	4–2	Pittsburgh Penguins	Madison Square Garden (IV) (14,272)	11–27–9	31	L
48	21	Philadelphia Flyers	2–1	Pittsburgh Penguins	Wachovia Center (17,132)	11–28–9	31	L
49	23	Pittsburgh Penguins	2–4	Philadelphia Flyers	Mellon Arena (19,726)	11–29–9	31	L
50	25	Washington Capitals	1–8	Pittsburgh Penguins	Verizon Center (14,415)	12–29–9	33	W
51	26	Pittsburgh Penguins	3–4 SO	New York Islanders	Nassau Veterans Memorial Coliseum (16,362)	12–29–10	34	OTL
52	28	Pittsburgh Penguins	1–7	New York Rangers	Mellon Arena (18,200)	12–30–10	34	L

February: 2–4–1 (home: 0–2–1; road: 2–2–1), 5 Points

#	Feb	Visitor	Score	Home	Location	Record	Points	Recap
53	1	Pittsburgh Penguins	1–3	New York Rangers	Mellon Arena (18,200)	12–31–10	34	L
54	2	Ottawa Senators	7–2	Pittsburgh Penguins	Corel Centre (14,714)	12–32–10	34	L
55	4	New York Islanders	5–4 SO	Pittsburgh Penguins	Mellon Arena (11,218)	12–32–11	35	OTL
56	6	Pittsburgh Penguins	2–5	Ottawa Senators	Mellon Arena (19,877)	12–33–11	35	L
57	8	Boston Bruins	3–1	Pittsburgh Penguins	TD Banknorth Garden (15,603)	12–34–11	35	L
58	10	Pittsburgh Penguins	4–3	Carolina Hurricanes	Mellon Arena (18,830)	13–34–11	37	W
59	11	Pittsburgh Penguins	6–3	Washington Capitals	Mellon Arena (18,277)	14–34–11	39	W

March: 5–8–1 (home: 3–5–1; road: 2–3–0), 11 Points

#	Mar	Visitor	Score	Home	Location	Record	Points	Recap
60	1	Ottawa Senators	4–3	Pittsburgh Penguins	Corel Centre (14,026)	14–35–11	39	L
61	4	Carolina Hurricanes	7–5	Pittsburgh Penguins	RBC Center (16,293)	14–36–11	39	L
62	7	Tampa Bay Lightning	5–4 SO	Pittsburgh Penguins	St. Pete Times Forum (15,048)	14–36–12	40	OTL
63	8	Pittsburgh Penguins	3–6	Washington Capitals	Mellon Arena (14,374)	14–37–12	40	L
64	11	New Jersey Devils	3–6	Pittsburgh Penguins	Izod Center (16,061)	15–37–12	42	W
65	12	Philadelphia Flyers	0–2	Pittsburgh Penguins	Wachovia Center (14,904)	16–37–12	44	W
66	16	Pittsburgh Penguins	1–2	New Jersey Devils	Mellon Arena (11,513)	16–38–12	44	L
67	18	Pittsburgh Penguins	5–4	Montreal Canadiens	Mellon Arena (21,273)	17–38–12	46	W
68	19	Toronto Maple Leafs	1–0	Pittsburgh Penguins	Air Canada Centre (15,174)	17–39–12	46	L
69	21	Pittsburgh Penguins	2–5	Ottawa Senators	Mellon Arena (19,360)	17–40–12	46	L
70	24	New York Islanders	3–4 OT	Pittsburgh Penguins	Mellon Arena (11,286)	18–40–12	48	W
71	26	Montreal Canadiens	6–5	Pittsburgh Penguins	Bell Centre (14,807)	18–41–12	48	L
72	29	Florida Panthers	5–3	Pittsburgh Penguins	BankAtlantic Center (14,024)	18–42–12	48	L
73	31	Pittsburgh Penguins	4–0	New York Islanders	Nassau Veterans Memorial Coliseum (15,210)	19–42–12	50	W

April: 3–4–2 (home: 2–0–1; road: 1–4–1), 8 Points

#	Apr	Visitor	Score	Home	Location	Record	Points	Recap
74	2	New Jersey Devils	3–2 OT	Pittsburgh Penguins	Izod Center (14,427)	19–42–13	51	OTL
75	5	Pittsburgh Penguins	4–6	New Jersey Devils	Mellon Arena (13,118)	19–43–13	51	L
76	7	Pittsburgh Penguins	5–1	Florida Panthers	Mellon Arena (14,776)	20–43–13	53	W
77	8	Pittsburgh Penguins	0–1	Tampa Bay Lightning	Mellon Arena (20,844)	20–44–13	53	L
78	11	Pittsburgh Penguins	3–4	Philadelphia Flyers	Mellon Arena (19,756)	20–45–13	53	L
79	13	New York Rangers	3–5	Pittsburgh Penguins	Madison Square Garden (IV) (15,155)	21–45–13	55	W
80	15	Pittsburgh Penguins	4–5 SO	New York Islanders	Nassau Veterans Memorial Coliseum (17,084)	21–45–14	56	OTL
81	17	New York Islanders	1–6	Pittsburgh Penguins	Mellon Arena (12,282)	22–45–14	58	W
82	18	Pittsburgh Penguins	3–5	Toronto Maple Leafs	Mellon Arena (19,392)	22–46–14	58	L

Legend: W Win (2 points) L Loss (0 points) OTL Overtime/shootout loss (1 point)

== Player statistics ==
Skaters

Regular season
Player	GP	G	A	Pts	+/−	PIM
Sidney Crosby	81	39	63	102	-1	110
Sergei Gonchar	75	12	46	58	-13	100
Mark Recchi^{‡}	63	24	33	57	-28	56
John LeClair	73	22	29	51	-24	61
Ryan Malone	77	22	22	44	-22	63
Ziggy Palffy	42	11	31	42	5	12
Colby Armstrong	47	16	24	40	15	58
Ryan Whitney	68	6	32	38	-7	85
Michel Ouellet	50	16	16	32	-13	16
Ric Jackman^{‡}	49	6	22	28	-20	46
Tomas Surovy	53	12	13	25	-13	45
Mario Lemieux	26	7	15	22	-16	16
Andy Hilbert^{†}	19	7	11	18	8	16
Josef Melichar	72	3	12	15	-2	66
Erik Christensen	33	6	7	13	-3	34
Eric Boguniecki^{†}	38	5	6	11	-2	29
Dick Tarnstrom^{‡}	33	5	5	10	-10	52
Konstantin Koltsov	60	3	6	9	-10	20
Brooks Orpik	64	2	7	9	-3	124
Max Talbot	48	5	3	8	-12	59
Lasse Pirjeta	25	4	3	7	4	18
Jani Rita^{†}	30	3	4	7	-6	4
Matt Murley	41	1	5	6	-9	24
Noah Welch	5	1	3	4	0	2
Steve Poapst^{‡}	21	0	4	4	-5	10
Rob Scuderi	57	0	4	4	-18	36
Andre Roy	42	2	1	3	-3	116
Shane Endicott	41	1	1	2	-9	43
Eric Cairns^{†}	27	1	0	1	0	87
Ryan Vandenbussche	20	1	0	1	0	42
Lyle Odelein	27	0	1	1	-10	50
Cory Cross^{†‡}	6	0	1	1	-1	6
Matt Hussey	13	0	1	1	-5	0
Alain Nasreddine	6	0	0	0	2	8
Niklas Nordgren	15	0	0	0	-4	4
Rico Fata	20	0	0	0	-5	10
Guillaume Lefebvre	9	0	0	0	-3	9
Total		243	431	674	—	1,537

Goaltenders

Regular season
Player	GP	GS	TOI	W	L	OT	GA	GAA	SA	SV%	SO	G	A	PIM
Marc-Andre Fleury	50	45	2809:13	13	27	6	152	3.25	1485	0.898	1	0	1	0
Sebastien Caron	26	23	1312:18	8	9	5	87	3.98	733	0.881	1	0	1	0
Jocelyn Thibault	16	13	806:42	1	9	3	60	4.46	484	0.876	0	0	0	2
Dany Sabourin	1	1	20:33	0	1	0	4	11.68	14	0.714	0	0	0	0
Total		82	4948:46	22	46	14	303	3.67	2716	0.888	2	0	2	2

^{†}Denotes player spent time with another team before joining the Penguins. Stats reflect time with the Penguins only.
^{‡}Denotes player was traded mid-season. Stats reflect time with the Penguins only.

== Awards and records ==
=== Awards ===
Type	Award/honor	Recipient	Ref
League (annual)	NHL All-Rookie Team	Sidney Crosby (Forward)	
League (in-season)	NHL Rookie of the Month	Sidney Crosby (October)	
Team	A. T. Caggiano Memorial Booster Club Award	Sidney Crosby	
Team	Aldege "Baz" Bastien Memorial Good Guy Award	Sidney Crosby	
Team	Michel Briere Memorial Rookie of the Year Trophy	Sidney Crosby	
Team	Most Valuable Player Award	Sidney Crosby	
Team	Players' Player Award	John LeClair	
Team	The Edward J. DeBartolo Community Service Award	Colby Armstrong	
Team	The Edward J. DeBartolo Community Service Award	Marc-Andre Fleury	
Team	The Edward J. DeBartolo Community Service Award	Ryan Malone	
Team	The Edward J. DeBartolo Community Service Award	Ryan Whitney	

=== Records ===
- Sidney Crosby set the franchise record for most assists (63) and points (102) as a rookie. He broke the previous records of 57 and 100 respectively set by Mario Lemieux in 1985.

=== Milestones ===
- Sidney Crosby played his first professional NHL game on October 5, 2005, against the New Jersey Devils, and registered an assist on the team's first goal of the season, scored by Mark Recchi in a 5–1 loss.
- November 11, 2005 – Sidney Crosby beat Jose Theodore of the Montreal Canadiens to win his first career shootout.
- November 11, 2005- Mario Lemieux scores his seventh goal of the season, and the last of his career.
- November 22, 2005 – Sidney Crosby and Alexander Ovechkin face each other for the first time.
- March 12, 2006 – Marc-Andre Fleury gets a shutout by stopping 22 shots against the Philadelphia Flyers.
- March 29, 2006 – John LeClair scores the 400th goal of his career.
- January 24, 2006 – Mario Lemieux announces his retirement.
- April 13, 2006 – Sidney Crosby scores four points in one game, including his 90th point of the season.
- April 17, 2006 – Sidney Crosby becomes the youngest player to score 100 points in one season.

== Transactions ==
The Penguins were involved in the following transactions from February 17, 2005, the day after the 2004–05 NHL season was officially cancelled, through June 19, 2006, the day of the deciding game of the 2006 Stanley Cup Finals.

=== Trades ===
Date	Details		Ref
August 10, 2005	To Chicago Blackhawks: 4th-round pick in 2006	To Pittsburgh Penguins: Jocelyn Thibault	
September 9, 2005	To Nashville Predators: Kris Beech	To Pittsburgh Penguins: Conditional draft pick	
December 9, 2005	To St. Louis Blues: Steve Poapst	To Pittsburgh Penguins: Eric Boguniecki	
January 18, 2006	To Florida Panthers: 6th-round pick in 2006	To Pittsburgh Penguins: Eric Cairns	
January 26, 2006	To Edmonton Oilers: Dick Tarnstrom	To Pittsburgh Penguins: Cory Cross; Jani Rita	
March 9, 2006	To Florida Panthers: Ric Jackman	To Pittsburgh Penguins: Petr Taticek	
March 9, 2006	To Carolina Hurricanes: Mark Recchi	To Pittsburgh Penguins: Krys Kolanos; Niklas Nordgren; 2nd-round pick in 2007	
March 9, 2006	To Detroit Red Wings: Cory Cross	To Pittsburgh Penguins: 4th-round pick in 2007	

=== Players acquired ===
Date	Player	Former team	Term	Via	Ref
August 3, 2005	Sergei Gonchar	Boston Bruins	5-year	Free agency	
August 4, 2005	Andre Roy	Tampa Bay Lightning	3-year	Free agency	
August 8, 2005	Zigmund Palffy	HC Slavia Praha (ELH)	3-year	Free agency	
August 10, 2005	Dany Sabourin	Wilkes-Barre/Scranton Penguins (AHL)		Free agency	
August 15, 2005	John LeClair	Philadelphia Flyers	2-year	Free agency	
August 15, 2005	Steve Poapst	Chicago Blackhawks		Free agency	
September 2, 2005	Lyle Odelein	Florida Panthers	1-year	Free agency	
March 9, 2006	Andy Hilbert	Chicago Blackhawks		Waivers	

=== Players lost ===
Date	Player	New team	Via (Note: In parentheses is the player's free agency group on August 1 if applicable.)	Ref
N/A	Darcy Robinson	Asiago HC (Serie A)	Free agency (UFA)	
May 31, 2005	Ross Lupaschuk	Mora IK (SHL)	Free agency (II) (Note: Pittsburgh retained Lupaschuk’s NHL rights through the 2007–08 season.)	
July 12, 2005	Martin Strbak	HC CSKA Moscow (RSL)	Free agency (II) (Note: Pittsburgh retained Strbak’s NHL rights through the 2005–06 season.)	
August 1, 2005	Mike Eastwood (Note: Eastwood retired.)		Contract expiration (III)	
August 8, 2005	Ramzi Abid	Atlanta Thrashers	Free agency (VI)	
August 18, 2005	Matt Bradley	Washington Capitals	Free agency (UFA)	
September 6, 2005	Michal Rozsival	New York Rangers	Free agency (UFA)	
October 2005	Steven Crampton	Norfolk Admirals (AHL)	Free agency (UFA)	
January 18, 2006	Zigmund Palffy		Retirement	
January 24, 2006	Mario Lemieux		Retirement	
January 31, 2006	Rico Fata	Atlanta Thrashers	Waivers	
May 2, 2006	Jani Rita	Jokerit (Liiga)	Free agency (Note: Pittsburgh retained Rita's NHL rights through the 2008–09 season.)	
May 10, 2006	Niklas Nordgren	Rapperswil-Jona Lakers (NLA)	Free agency (Note: Pittsburgh retained Nordgren's NHL rights through the 2006–07 season.)	
May 26, 2006	Chris Kelleher	Linkoping HC (SHL)	Free agency	
June 17, 2006	Lasse Pirjeta	Malmo Redhawks (SHL)	Free agency	

=== Signings ===
Date	Player	Term	Contract type	Ref
July 27, 2005	Paul Bissonnette		Entry-level	
July 27, 2005	Daniel Carcillo		Entry-level	
July 27, 2005	Stephen Dixon		Entry-level	
July 27, 2005	Jonathan Filewich		Entry-level	
July 28, 2005	Ryan Stone		Entry-level	
July 29, 2005	Andy Schneider		Entry-level	
August 3, 2005	Ryan Lannon	3-year	Entry-level	
August 3, 2005	Noah Welch	3-year	Entry-level	
August 9, 2005	Rob Scuderi		Re-signing	
August 10, 2005	Kris Beech	1-year	Re-signing	
August 10, 2005	Jocelyn Thibault	multi-year	Re-signing	
August 11, 2005	Shane Endicott	multi-year	Re-signing	
August 12, 2005	Colby Armstrong		Re-signing	
August 15, 2005	Matt Hussey		Re-signing	
August 15, 2005	Guillaume Lefebvre		Re-signing	
August 15, 2005	Josef Melichar	2-year	Re-signing	
August 15, 2005	Matt Murley		Re-signing	
August 16, 2005	Konstantin Koltsov		Re-signing	
August 17, 2005	David Koci		Re-signing	
August 18, 2005	Michel Ouellet	multi-year	Re-signing	
August 24, 2005	Daniel Fernholm		Entry-level	
August 29, 2005	Dick Tarnstrom	1-year	Arbitration award	
September 1, 2005	Ryan Malone		Re-signing	
September 8, 2005	Sidney Crosby	3-year	Entry-level	
September 9, 2005	Mario Lemieux	1-year	Re-signing	
September 13, 2005	Brooks Orpik	1-year	Re-signing	
May 19, 2006	Tyler Kennedy	multi-year	Entry-level	
June 15, 2006	Micki DuPont	multi-year	Re-signing	

=== Other ===
Player	Date	Details
Kevin Stevens	September 2, 2005	Hired as scout
Eddie Olczyk	December 15, 2005	Fired as head coach
John Welday	December 15, 2005	Fired as strength & conditioning coach
Randy Hillier	December 15, 2005	Fired as assistant coach
Shane Clifford	December 15, 2005	Fired as goaltending coach
Joe Mullen	December 15, 2005	Fired as assistant coach
Michel Therrien	December 15, 2005	Hired as head coach
Stephane Dube	December 15, 2005	Hired as strength and conditioning coach
Mike Yeo	December 15, 2005	Hired as assistant coach
Gilles LeFebvre	December 15, 2005	Hired as goaltending coach
Craig Patrick	April 20, 2006	Fired as GM
Ray Shero	May 25, 2006	Hired as GM, 5-year contract

== Draft picks ==
Pittsburgh's draft picks at the 2005 NHL entry draft held at the Westin Hotel in Ottawa, Ontario.

Round	#	Player	Pos	Nationality	College/Junior/Club team (League)
1	1	Sidney Crosby	Center	Canada	Rimouski Océanic (QMJHL)
2	61	Michael Gergen	Forward	United States	Shattuck-Saint Mary's (USHS-MN)
3	62	Kris Letang	Defense	Canada	Val-d'Or Foreurs (QMJHL)
4	125	Tommi Leinonen	Defense	Finland	Oulun Kärpät Jr. (Finland)
5	126	Tim Crowder	Right wing	Canada	South Surrey Eagles (BCHL)
6	194	Jean-Philippe Paquet	Defense	Canada	Shawinigan Cataractes (QMJHL)
7	195	Joe Vitale	Center	United States	Sioux Falls Stampede (USHL)
