= 2005–06 Boston Bruins season =

NHL team season

2005–06 Boston Bruins
- Division: 5th Northeast
- Conference: 13th Eastern
- 2005–06 record: 29–37–16
- Home record: 16–15–10
- Road record: 13–22–6
- Goals for: 230
- Goals against: 266

Team information
- General manager: Mike O'Connell (Oct.–Mar.); Jeff Gorton (Mar.–Apr.)
- Coach: Mike Sullivan
- Captain: Joe Thornton (Oct.–Nov.); Vacant (Nov.–Apr.)
- Alternate captains: Hal Gill (Nov.–Apr.); Brian Leetch; Glen Murray
- Arena: TD Banknorth Garden
- Average attendance: 16,211 (92.3%)
- Minor league affiliate: Providence Bruins

Team leaders
- Goals: Patrice Bergeron (31)
- Assists: Brad Boyes (43)
- Points: Patrice Bergeron (73)
- Penalty minutes: Hal Gill (124)
- Plus/minus: Marco Sturm (+14)
- Wins: Tim Thomas (12)
- Goals against average: Hannu Toivonen (2.63)

The 2005–06 Boston Bruins season was their 82nd season of operation. The Bruins slipped to 13th in the Eastern Conference and did not qualify for the playoffs for the first time since 2000–01 season.

== Off-season ==
Key dates prior to the start of the season:

- The 2005 NHL entry draft took place in Ottawa, Ontario, on July 30, 2005.
- The free agency period began on August 1.

== Regular season ==
After Joe Thornton voiced his unhappiness with his contract in Boston in 2005, many teams reportedly sent offers to the Bruins. However, Thornton re-signed with the team on August 11, 2005, on a three-year contract worth US$20 million. On November 30, 2005, he was traded to the San Jose Sharks in a blockbuster four-player deal which sent forwards Marco Sturm and Wayne Primeau and defenseman Brad Stuart to Boston. Thornton was the team's leading scorer at the time by a substantial margin and many felt Bruins general manager Mike O'Connell had traded away one of the few players who was truly showing an exemplary effort. On January 10, 2006, Thornton returned to Boston as a member of the Sharks, but was ejected for checking Bruins' defenseman Hal Gill from behind at 5:13 of the first period. Thornton received a five-minute major and a game misconduct. The misconduct was later rescinded by the NHL.

General manager Mike O'Connell was fired on March 25 and replaced on an interim basis by assistant general manager Jeff Gorton.

The Bruins ended up finishing with the third-worst record in the Eastern Conference, but the story of the season for the team was the emergence of goaltender Tim Thomas. Thomas had been in the Bruins organization before and had become a star in Europe before deciding to give the NHL one last try. Injuries to incumbent starter Andrew Raycroft and backup Hannu Toivonen pushed Thomas into the starting role, one that he did not relinquish until after the 2011–12 season.

=== Final standings ===
Northeast Division
No.	CR		GP	W	L	OTL	GF	GA	Pts
1	1	**Ottawa Senators**	82	52	21	9	314	211	113
2	4	**Buffalo Sabres**	82	52	24	6	281	239	110
3	7	**Montreal Canadiens**	82	42	31	9	243	247	93
4	9	Toronto Maple Leafs	82	41	33	8	257	270	90
5	13	Boston Bruins	82	29	37	16	230	266	74

Note: CR = Conference rank; GP = Games played; W = Wins; L = Losses; OTL = Overtime/Shootout loss; GF = Goals for; GA = Goals against; Pts = Points
Bolded teams qualified for the playoffs.

Eastern Conference
R		Div	GP	W	L	OTL	GF	GA	Pts
**1**	**Z-** Ottawa Senators	**NE**	**82**	**52**	**21**	**9**	**314**	**211**	113
**2**	**Y-** Carolina Hurricanes	**SE**	**82**	**52**	**22**	**8**	**294**	**260**	112
**3**	**Y-** New Jersey Devils	**AT**	**82**	**46**	**27**	**9**	**242**	**229**	101
**4**	**X-** Buffalo Sabres	**NE**	**82**	**52**	**24**	**6**	**242**	**239**	110
**5**	**X-** Philadelphia Flyers	**AT**	**82**	**45**	**26**	**11**	**267**	**259**	101
**6**	**X-** New York Rangers	**AT**	**82**	**44**	**26**	**12**	**257**	**215**	100
**7**	**X-** Montreal Canadiens	**NE**	**82**	**42**	**31**	**9**	**243**	**247**	93
**8**	**X-** Tampa Bay Lightning	**SE**	**82**	**43**	**33**	**6**	**252**	**260**	92
8.5
9	Toronto Maple Leafs	NE	82	41	33	8	257	270	90
10	Atlanta Thrashers	SE	82	41	33	8	281	275	90
11	Florida Panthers	SE	82	37	34	11	240	257	85
12	New York Islanders	AT	82	36	40	6	230	278	78
13	Boston Bruins	NE	82	29	37	16	230	266	74
14	Washington Capitals	SE	82	29	41	12	237	306	70
15	Pittsburgh Penguins	AT	82	22	46	14	244	316	58

Divisions: AT – Atlantic, NE – Northeast, SE – Southeast

Z – Clinched conference; Y – Clinched division; X – Clinched playoff spot

== Schedule and results ==
2005–06 regular season
October: 5–5–3 (home: 2–2–1; road: 3–3–2)

Game	Date	Score	Opponent	Record	Recap
1	October 5, 2005	1–2	Montreal Canadiens (2005–06)	0–1–0	L
2	October 7, 2005	1–4	@ Buffalo Sabres (2005–06)	0–2–0	L
3	October 8, 2005	7–6 OT	@ Pittsburgh Penguins (2005–06)	1–2–0	W
4	October 10, 2005	4–2	@ Tampa Bay Lightning (2005–06)	2–2–0	W
5	October 13, 2005	5–2	@ Florida Panthers (2005–06)	3–2–0	W
6	October 15, 2005	1–5	@ Ottawa Senators (2005–06)	3–3–0	L
7	October 18, 2005	3–4	@ Montreal Canadiens (2005–06)	3–4–0	L
8	October 20, 2005	3–4	Buffalo Sabres (2005–06)	3–5–0	L
9	October 22, 2005	6–3	Pittsburgh Penguins (2005–06)	4–5–0	W
10	October 24, 2005	4–5 SO	@ Toronto Maple Leafs (2005–06)	4–5–1	OTL
11	October 26, 2005	3–4 OT	@ Carolina Hurricanes (2005–06)	4–5–2	OTL
12	October 27, 2005	2–1	Toronto Maple Leafs (2005–06)	5–5–2	W
13	October 29, 2005	4–5 SO	New Jersey Devils (2005–06)	5–5–3	OTL

November: 3–8–2 (home: 2–4–0; road: 1–4–2)

Game	Date	Score	Opponent	Record	Recap
14	November 1, 2005	3–4 OT	@ New York Islanders (2005–06)	5–5–4	OTL
15	November 3, 2005	4–1	Florida Panthers (2005–06)	6–5–4	W
16	November 5, 2005	6–3	Pittsburgh Penguins (2005–06)	7–5–4	W
17	November 8, 2005	3–4 OT	@ Philadelphia Flyers (2005–06)	7–5–5	OTL
18	November 10, 2005	2–5	Ottawa Senators (2005–06)	7–6–5	L
19	November 12, 2005	2–5	@ New York Islanders (2005–06)	7–7–5	L
20	November 17, 2005	1–4	Toronto Maple Leafs (2005–06)	7–8–5	L
21	November 19, 2005	2–3	Buffalo Sabres (2005–06)	7–9–5	L
22	November 20, 2005	2–3	@ New York Rangers (2005–06)	7–10–5	L
23	November 23, 2005	5–1	@ Toronto Maple Leafs (2005–06)	8–10–5	W
24	November 25, 2005	3–5	Philadelphia Flyers (2005–06)	8–11–5	L
25	November 26, 2005	2–4	@ Ottawa Senators (2005–06)	8–12–5	L
26	November 29, 2005	2–3	@ New Jersey Devils (2005–06)	8–13–5	L

December: 6–5–1 (home: 2–0–1; road: 4–5–0)

Game	Date	Score	Opponent	Record	Recap
27	December 1, 2005	3–0	Ottawa Senators (2005–06)	9–13–5	W
28	December 3, 2005	5–4 OT	@ Edmonton Oilers (2005–06)	10–13–5	W
29	December 4, 2005	2–5	@ Vancouver Canucks (2005–06)	10–14–5	L
30	December 7, 2005	1–4	@ Colorado Avalanche (2005–06)	10–15–5	L
31	December 11, 2005	1–2 OT	Phoenix Coyotes (2005–06)	10–15–6	OTL
32	December 15, 2005	3–2	@ Minnesota Wild (2005–06)	11–15–6	W
33	December 17, 2005	0–3	@ Calgary Flames (2005–06)	11–16–6	L
34	December 22, 2005	4–1	Toronto Maple Leafs (2005–06)	12–16–6	W
35	December 23, 2005	1–2	@ Toronto Maple Leafs (2005–06)	12–17–6	L
36	December 27, 2005	4–3 OT	@ Washington Capitals (2005–06)	13–17–6	W
37	December 28, 2005	4–6	@ Florida Panthers (2005–06)	13–18–6	L
38	December 30, 2005	2–1	@ Tampa Bay Lightning (2005–06)	14–18–6	W

January: 8–4–2 (home: 4–4–2; road: 4–0–0)

Game	Date	Score	Opponent	Record	Recap
39	January 2, 2006	0–1	Philadelphia Flyers (2005–06)	14–19–6	L
40	January 5, 2006	4–2	Ottawa Senators (2005–06)	15–19–6	W
41	January 7, 2006	6–3	Tampa Bay Lightning (2005–06)	16–19–6	W
42	January 10, 2006	2–6	San Jose Sharks (2005–06)	16–20–6	L
43	January 12, 2006	0–6	Los Angeles Kings (2005–06)	16–21–6	L
44	January 14, 2006	1–2 SO	Dallas Stars (2005–06)	16–21–7	OTL
45	January 16, 2006	4–3 OT	Mighty Ducks of Anaheim (2005–06)	17–21–7	W
46	January 19, 2006	5–2	@ Philadelphia Flyers (2005–06)	18–21–7	W
47	January 21, 2006	2–3 SO	New York Rangers (2005–06)	18–21–8	OTL
48	January 23, 2006	3–2	@ Washington Capitals (2005–06)	19–21–8	W
49	January 24, 2006	3–2	@ Atlanta Thrashers (2005–06)	20–21–8	W
50	January 26, 2006	3–2	Washington Capitals (2005–06)	21–21–8	W
51	January 28, 2006	3–4	New York Islanders (2005–06)	21–22–8	L
52	January 30, 2006	5–0	@ Ottawa Senators (2005–06)	22–22–8	W

February: 2–2–2 (home: 1–1–2; road: 1–1–0)

Game	Date	Score	Opponent	Record	Recap
53	February 2, 2006	3–1	Montreal Canadiens (2005–06)	23–22–8	W
54	February 4, 2006	0–2	@ Montreal Canadiens (2005–06)	23–23–8	L
55	February 5, 2006	3–4 SO	Carolina Hurricanes (2005–06)	23–23–9	OTL
56	February 8, 2006	3–1	@ Pittsburgh Penguins (2005–06)	24–23–9	W
57	February 9, 2006	2–3 OT	New Jersey Devils (2005–06)	24–23–10	OTL
58	February 11, 2006	5–6	Tampa Bay Lightning (2005–06)	24–24–10	L

March: 4–9–3 (home: 4–3–2; road: 0–6–1)

Game	Date	Score	Opponent	Record	Recap
59	March 1, 2006	3–4	@ Carolina Hurricanes (2005–06)	24–25–10	L
60	March 2, 2006	3–2	Atlanta Thrashers (2005–06)	25–25–10	W
61	March 4, 2006	2–3	Buffalo Sabres (2005–06)	25–26–10	L
62	March 7, 2006	2–3	@ Buffalo Sabres (2005–06)	25–27–10	L
63	March 9, 2006	0–3	Montreal Canadiens (2005–06)	25–28–10	L
64	March 11, 2006	1–3	New York Islanders (2005–06)	25–29–10	L
65	March 12, 2006	2–6	@ Buffalo Sabres (2005–06)	25–30–10	L
66	March 14, 2006	4–5 SO	@ Toronto Maple Leafs (2005–06)	25–30–11	OTL
67	March 16, 2006	3–2 SO	Ottawa Senators (2005–06)	26–30–11	W
68	March 18, 2006	4–2	Carolina Hurricanes (2005–06)	27–30–11	W
69	March 20, 2006	2–5	@ New York Rangers (2005–06)	27–31–11	L
70	March 21, 2006	4–5 SO	Atlanta Thrashers (2005–06)	27–31–12	OTL
71	March 24, 2006	2–4	@ New Jersey Devils (2005–06)	27–32–12	L
72	March 25, 2006	5–4	Buffalo Sabres (2005–06)	28–32–12	W
73	March 27, 2006	3–4 SO	Florida Panthers (2005–06)	28–32–13	OTL
74	March 29, 2006	3–4	@ Buffalo Sabres (2005–06)	28–33–13	L

April: 1–4–3 (home: 1–1–2; road: 0–3–1)

Game	Date	Score	Opponent	Record	Recap
75	April 1, 2006	0–2	@ Montreal Canadiens (2005–06)	28–34–13	L
76	April 4, 2006	3–5	@ Montreal Canadiens (2005–06)	28–35–13	L
77	April 6, 2006	3–2 SO	Toronto Maple Leafs (2005–06)	29–35–13	W
78	April 8, 2006	3–4 OT	New York Rangers (2005–06)	29–35–14	OTL
79	April 10, 2006	1–2 OT	Washington Capitals (2005–06)	29–35–15	OTL
80	April 11, 2006	3–4 OT	@ Ottawa Senators (2005–06)	29–35–16	OTL
81	April 13, 2006	3–4	Montreal Canadiens (2005–06)	29–36–16	L
82	April 15, 2006	3–4	@ Atlanta Thrashers (2005–06)	29–37–16	L

Legend: W Win (2 points) L Loss (0 points) OTL Overtime/shootout loss (1 point)

== Player statistics ==
=== Scoring ===
- Position abbreviations: C = Center; D = Defense; G = Goaltender; LW = Left wing; RW = Right wing
- † = Joined team via a transaction (e.g., trade, waivers, signing) during the season. Stats reflect time with the Bruins only.
- ‡ = Left team via a transaction (e.g., trade, waivers, release) during the season. Stats reflect time with the Bruins only.

No.	Player	Pos	Regular season					
No.	Player	Pos	GP	G	A	Pts	+/-	PIM
37	Patrice Bergeron	C	81	31	42	73	3	22
26	Brad Boyes	C	82	26	43	69	11	30
27	Glen Murray	RW	64	24	29	53	−8	52
16	Marco Sturm†	LW	51	23	20	43	14	32
14	Sergei Samsonov‡	LW	55	18	19	37	−3	22
19	Joe Thornton‡	C	23	9	24	33	0	6
22	Brian Leetch	D	61	5	27	32	−10	36
6	Brad Stuart†	D	55	10	21	31	−6	38
11	P. J. Axelsson	LW	59	10	18	28	−3	4
21	Brad Isbister	LW	58	6	17	23	−2	46
39	Travis Green	C	82	10	12	22	−2	79
71	Jiri Slegr	D	32	5	11	16	−2	56
55	David Tanabe†	D	54	4	12	16	0	48
20	Wayne Primeau†	C	50	6	8	14	−10	40
44	Nick Boynton	D	54	5	7	12	−7	93
68	Milan Jurcina	D	51	6	5	11	3	54
12	Tom Fitzgerald	RW	71	4	6	10	−10	40
38	Dave Scatchard‡	C	16	4	6	10	−2	28
25	Hal Gill	D	80	1	9	10	−4	124
10	Alexei Zhamnov	C	24	1	9	10	−4	30
83	Pat Leahy	RW	43	4	4	8	−2	19
17	Shawn McEachern	RW	28	2	6	8	−12	22
36	Marty Reasoner†	C	19	2	6	8	−2	8
41	Andrew Alberts	D	73	1	6	7	3	68
47	Eric Nickulas	RW	16	2	4	6	2	8
29	Mariusz Czerkawski†	RW	16	4	1	5	−4	4
28	Dan LaCouture†	LW	55	2	2	4	−6	53
43	Yan Stastny†	C	17	1	3	4	−2	10
18	Ian Moran	D	12	1	1	2	0	10
45	Mark Stuart	D	17	1	1	2	−1	10
58	Kevin Dallman‡	D	21	0	1	1	1	8
23	Josh Langfeld†	RW	18	0	1	1	−6	10
30	Tim Thomas	G	38	0	1	1		4
89	Zdenek Blatny‡	LW	5	0	0	0	−2	2
50	Ben Guite	RW	1	0	0	0	0	0
40	Eric Healey	LW	2	0	0	0	0	2
48	Jay Leach	D	2	0	0	0	1	7
75	Colton Orr‡	RW	20	0	0	0	0	27
1	Andrew Raycroft	G	30	0	0	0		0
51	Nathan Robinson	C	2	0	0	0	0	0
57	Jordan Sigalet	G	1	0	0	0		0
33	Hannu Toivonen	G	20	0	0	0		6
72	Ben Walter	C	6	0	0	0	2	4

=== Goaltending ===
No.	Player	Regular season									
No.	Player	GP	W	L	OT	SA	GA	GAA	SV%	SO	TOI
30	Tim Thomas	38	12	13	10	1213	101	2.77	.917	1	2187
33	Hannu Toivonen	20	9	5	4	590	51	2.63	.914	1	1163
1	Andrew Raycroft	30	8	19	2	824	100	3.71	.879	0	1619
57	Jordan Sigalet	1	0	0	0	0	0	0.00		0	1

== Awards and records ==
=== Awards ===
Type	Award/honor	Recipient	Ref
League (annual)	NHL All-Rookie Team	Brad Boyes (Forward)	
Team	Eddie Shore Award	P. J. Axelsson	
Team	Elizabeth C. Dufresne Trophy	Patrice Bergeron	
Team	John P. Bucyk Award	P. J. Axelsson	
Team	Seventh Player Award	Tim Thomas	
Team	Three Stars Awards	Patrice Bergeron (1st)	
Team	Three Stars Awards	Brad Boyes (2nd)	
Team	Three Stars Awards	Tim Thomas (3rd)	

=== Milestones ===
Milestone	Player	Date	Ref
First game	Andrew Alberts	October 5, 2005	
First game	Kevin Dallman	October 5, 2005	
First game	Milan Jurcina	October 8, 2005	
First game	Hannu Toivonen	October 8, 2005	
First game	Jay Leach	November 5, 2005	
First game	Eric Healey	November 25, 2005	
First game	Jordan Sigalet	January 7, 2006	
First game	Ben Walter	January 12, 2006	
First game	Ben Guite	January 30, 2006	
First game	Mark Stuart	March 11, 2006	
1,000th point	Brian Leetch	October 18, 2005	

== Transactions ==
The Bruins were involved in the following transactions from February 17, 2005, the day after the 2004–05 NHL season was officially cancelled, through June 19, 2006, the day of the deciding game of the 2006 Stanley Cup Finals.

=== Trades ===
Date	Details		Ref
July 31, 2005	To Edmonton Oilers: 4th-round pick in 2006	To Boston Bruins: Brad Isbister	
August 30, 2005	To Edmonton Oilers: Rights to Yan Stastny	To Boston Bruins: Boston’s 4th-round pick in 2006	
November 6, 2005	To Chicago Blackhawks: Rights to Andy Hilbert	To Boston Bruins: 5th-round pick in 2006	
November 18, 2005	To Phoenix Coyotes: Dave Scatchard	To Boston Bruins: David Tanabe	
November 30, 2005	To San Jose Sharks: Joe Thornton	To Boston Bruins: Wayne Primeau; Brad Stuart; Marco Sturm	
February 8, 2006	To Tampa Bay Lightning: Zdenek Blatny	To Boston Bruins: Brian Eklund	
March 9, 2006	To Edmonton Oilers: Sergei Samsonov	To Boston Bruins: Marty Reasoner; Yan Stastny; 2nd-round pick in 2006	
May 26, 2006 (Note: Compensation due to Boston hiring Chiarelli as their general manager.)	To Ottawa Senators: 3rd-round pick in 2006	To Boston Bruins: Peter Chiarelli	
June 15, 2006	To Toronto Maple Leafs: 7th-round pick in 2006	To Boston Bruins: Rights to Petr Tenkrat	

=== Players acquired ===
Date	Player	Former team	Term	Via	Ref
August 2, 2005	Shawn McEachern	Atlanta Thrashers	2-year	Free agency	
August 2, 2005	Dave Scatchard	New York Islanders	4-year	Free agency	
August 3, 2005	Brian Leetch	Toronto Maple Leafs	1-year	Free agency	
August 4, 2005	Alexei Zhamnov	HC Vityaz Chekhov (RUS-2)	3-year	Free agency	
August 12, 2005	Jiri Slegr	HC Litvinov (ELH)	1-year	Free agency	
August 15, 2005	Ben Guite	Providence Bruins (AHL)	1-year	Free agency	
August 15, 2005	Eric Healey	Adler Mannheim (DEL)	1-year	Free agency	
August 15, 2005	Jason MacDonald	Toronto Maple Leafs	1-year	Free agency	
August 15, 2005	Nathan Robinson	Detroit Red Wings	1-year	Free agency	
August 23, 2005	Jay Leach	Providence Bruins (AHL)	2-year	Free agency	
August 23, 2005	Eric Nickulas	Chicago Blackhawks	1-year	Free agency	
August 23, 2005	Garret Stroshein	Washington Capitals	1-year	Free agency	
September 7, 2005	Pat Leahy	Providence Bruins (AHL)	1-year	Free agency	
September 7, 2005	Tyler Redenbach	Lethbridge Hurricanes (WHL)	3-year	Free agency	
September 7, 2005	Jeremy Reich	Columbus Blue Jackets	1-year	Free agency	
September 14, 2005	Tim Thomas	Jokerit (Liiga)	1-year	Free agency	
September 30, 2005	Zdenek Blatny	Orli Znojmo (ELH)		Free agency	
November 24, 2005	Dan LaCouture	HC Davos (NLA)		Free agency	
January 19, 2006	Craig Anderson	Chicago Blackhawks		Waivers	
January 31, 2006	Josh Langfeld	San Jose Sharks		Waivers	
March 8, 2006	Mariusz Czerkawski	Toronto Maple Leafs		Waivers	

=== Players lost ===
Date	Player	New team	Via (Note: In parentheses is the player's free agency group on August 1 if applicable.)	Ref
August 1, 2005	P. J. Stock (Note: Stock retired.)		Contract expiration (UFA)	
August 3, 2005	Sergei Gonchar	Pittsburgh Penguins	Free agency (III)	
August 4, 2005	Martin Lapointe	Chicago Blackhawks	Free agency (III)	
October 5, 2005	Kris Vernarsky	Motor City Mechanics (UHL)	Free agency (UFA)	
October 6, 2005	Martin Samuelsson	Linkoping HC (SHL)	Free agency (II) (Note: Boston retained Samuelsson’s NHL rights through the 2008–09 season.)	
November 29, 2005	Colton Orr	New York Rangers	Waivers	
November 30, 2005	Jonathan Girard		Retirement	
December 3, 2005	Kevin Dallman	St. Louis Blues	Waivers	
January 31, 2006	Craig Anderson	St. Louis Blues	Waivers	
June 19, 2006	Eric Nickulas	Hannover Scorpions (DEL)	Free agency	
June 19, 2006	Nathan Robinson	Adler Mannheim (DEL)	Free agency (Note: Boston retained Robinson’s NHL rights through the 2008–09 season.)	

=== Signings ===
Date	Player	Term	Contract type	Ref
July 28, 2005	Mike Brown	3-year	Entry-level	
July 28, 2005	Nate Thompson	3-year	Entry-level	
July 30, 2005	Andrew Alberts	1-year	Entry-level	
July 30, 2005	Mark Stuart	3-year	Entry-level	
August 2, 2005	Glen Murray	4-year	Re-signing	
August 10, 2005	P. J. Axelsson	1-year	Re-signing	
August 10, 2005	Jonathan Girard	1-year	Re-signing	
August 10, 2005	Sergei Samsonov	1-year	Re-signing	
August 10, 2005	Jordan Sigalet	1-year	Entry-level	
August 11, 2005	Joe Thornton	3-year	Re-signing	
August 15, 2005	Brad Boyes	1-year	Re-signing	
August 15, 2005	Kevin Dallman	1-year	Re-signing	
August 15, 2005	Jonathan Sigalet	3-year	Entry-level	
August 17, 2005	Travis Green	2-year	Re-signing	
August 30, 2005	Hal Gill	1-year	Re-signing	
August 31, 2005	Ben Walter	3-year	Entry-level	
September 7, 2005	Colton Orr	1-year	Re-signing	
September 16, 2005	Andrew Raycroft	1-year	Re-signing	
October 13, 2005	Nick Boynton	1-year	Re-signing	
March 18, 2006	Tim Thomas	3-year	Extension	
March 23, 2006	P. J. Axelsson	3-year	Extension	
March 24, 2006	Matt Lashoff	3-year	Entry-level	
May 8, 2006	Petr Kalus	3-year	Entry-level	
May 22, 2006	Martins Karsums	3-year	Entry-level	
May 22, 2006	David Krejci	3-year	Entry-level	
June 1, 2006	Kris Versteeg	3-year	Entry-level	
June 15, 2006	Petr Tenkrat	1-year	Re-signing	

== Draft picks ==
The 2005 NHL Entry Draft was the 43rd NHL entry draft. As a lockout cancelled the 2004–05 NHL season, the draft order was determined by lottery on July 22, 2005. Teams were assigned 1 to 3 balls based on their playoff appearances and first overall draft picks from the past three years. According to the draft order, the selection worked its way up to 30 as usual; then instead of repeating the order as in past years, the draft "snaked" back down to the team with the first pick. Therefore, the team with the first pick overall would not pick again until the 60th pick. The team with the 30th pick would also get the 31st pick. The draft was only seven rounds in length, compared to nine rounds in years past. The labor dispute caused the shortened draft.

- Boston's picks at the 2005 NHL entry draft in Ottawa, Ontario, Canada.

Round	#	Player	Nationality	College/Junior/Club team (League)
1	22	Matt Lashoff	United States	Kitchener Rangers (OHL)
2	39	Petr Kalus	Czech Republic	HC Vítkovice (Czech Republic)
3	83	Mikko Lehtonen	Finland	Espoo Blues Jr. (Finland)
4	100	Jonathan Sigalet	United States	Bowling Green State University (CCHA)
4	106	Vladimir Sobotka	Czech Republic	HC Slavia Prague Jr. (Czech Republic)
5	154	Wacey Rabbit	Canada	Saskatoon Blades (WHL)
6	172	Lukas Vantuch	Czech Republic	Bílí Tygři Liberec Jr. (Czech Republic)
7	217	Brock Bradford	Canada	Omaha Lancers (USHL)

== Farm teams ==
The Bruins' American Hockey League (AHL) affiliate was the Providence Bruins. The Bruins had 43 wins and 92 points and finished in fourth place in their division. The Bruins were eliminated in the first round of the playoffs against Portland. Eric Healey and Tim Thomas were selected to the AHL All-Star Game and Healey was the captain for PlanetUSA. Jonathan Sigalet was nominated for the AHL Man of the Year Award.

== See also ==
- 2005–06 NHL season
