= 2005–06 New Jersey Devils season =

National Hockey League season

2005–06 New Jersey Devils
- Atlantic Division champions
- Division: 1st Atlantic
- Conference: 3rd Eastern
- 2005–06 record: 46–27–9
- Home record: 27–11–3
- Road record: 19–16–6
- Goals for: 242
- Goals against: 229

Team information
- General manager: Lou Lamoriello
- Coach: Larry Robinson (Oct.–Dec.); Lou Lamoriello (Dec.–May)
- Captain: Vacant
- Alternate captains: Patrik Elias (Jan.–Apr.); John Madden; Alexander Mogilny (Oct.–Jan.); Colin White; Brian Rafalski
- Arena: Continental Airlines Arena
- Average attendance: 14,230
- Minor league affiliate: Albany River Rats

Team leaders
- Goals: Brian Gionta (48)
- Assists: Scott Gomez (51)
- Points: Brian Gionta (89)
- Penalty minutes: Cam Janssen and Colin White (91)
- Plus/minus: Brian Gionta (+18)
- Wins: Martin Brodeur (43)
- Goals against average: Martin Brodeur (2.57)

The 2005–06 New Jersey Devils season was the 32nd season for the National Hockey League (NHL) franchise that was established on June 11, 1974, and 24th season since the franchise relocated from Colorado prior to the 1982–83 NHL season. It was the team's first season back after the NHL canceled the previous season, due to the 2004–05 NHL lockout. The Devils rallied from a poor first half of the season to win the Atlantic Division title on the last day of the season. For the first time, the Devils defeated the New York Rangers in a playoff series, sweeping their rivals in their opening-round matchup.

== Season overview ==
Many of the Devils' players had played in other leagues while the NHL was inactive due to the lockout. Most notably was Patrik Elias, who missed the first 39 games of the season due to catching Hepatitis A while playing for the Metallurg Magnitogorsk of the Russian Superleague (RSL). With many new rule changes for the 2005–06 season, the Devils had to change their style of play. Martin Brodeur, one of the best puck-handling goalies, could no longer use this to his advantage as before, since restrictions were placed on where goalies could handle the puck. The Devils also lost long-time captain Scott Stevens and his physically punishing style of play to retirement, as well as another longtime defenseman, Scott Niedermayer, to free agency. Eventually, Niedermeyer signed with the Mighty Ducks of Anaheim, joining his brother, Rob.

In July 2005, the team announced that head coach Pat Burns would not return for the season after being diagnosed with cancer for the second time in little more than a year. Assistant coach Larry Robinson, the team's head coach from 2000 to 2002, was promoted to start the season.

On September 16, 2005, longtime Devils owner John McMullen passed away. In honor of his memory, the Devils jerseys had a small "JM" patch on them.

The Devils struggled early in the 2005–06 season, ending the 2005 calendar year with a 16–18–5 record. Robinson resigned as head coach on December 19, and Lamoriello moved down to the bench. Once Elias returned from his bout with hepatitis, the team quickly turned around with a nine-game winning streak, finishing 46–27–9 after a season-ending 11-game winning streak capped with a dramatic come-from-behind 4–3 win over the Montreal Canadiens. During that final victory, which clinched the Devils' sixth division title, Brian Gionta set a new team record for goals in a season with 48, topping Pat Verbeek's 46. The win streak to close the year was also an NHL record.

On April 29, 2006, the Devils won their first round Stanley Cup playoff series against the New York Rangers four games to none, extending their winning streak to 15 games and marking the first time the Devils defeated their cross-river rival in a playoff series. The team's season ended in the next round with a 4–1 Game 5 loss to the Carolina Hurricanes, who eventually won the Stanley Cup.

== Regular season ==
The Devils were the most disciplined team in the League, with just 349 power-play opportunities against. They also scored the fewest short-handed goals in the League, with just 3.

=== Season standings ===
Atlantic Division
No.	CR		GP	W	L	OTL	GF	GA	Pts
1	3	New Jersey Devils	82	46	27	9	242	229	101
2	5	Philadelphia Flyers	82	45	26	11	267	259	101
3	6	New York Rangers	82	44	26	12	257	215	100
4	12	New York Islanders	82	36	40	6	230	278	78
5	15	Pittsburgh Penguins	82	22	46	14	244	316	58

Eastern Conference
R		Div	GP	W	L	OTL	GF	GA	Pts
1	Z- Ottawa Senators	NE	82	52	21	9	314	211	113
2	Y- Carolina Hurricanes	SE	82	52	22	8	294	260	112
3	Y- New Jersey Devils	AT	82	46	27	9	242	229	101
4	X- Buffalo Sabres	NE	82	52	24	6	242	239	110
5	X- Philadelphia Flyers	AT	82	45	26	11	267	259	101
6	X- New York Rangers	AT	82	44	26	12	257	215	100
7	X- Montreal Canadiens	NE	82	42	31	9	243	247	93
8	X- Tampa Bay Lightning	SE	82	43	33	6	252	260	92
8.5
9	Toronto Maple Leafs	NE	82	41	33	8	257	270	90
10	Atlanta Thrashers	SE	82	41	33	8	281	275	90
11	Florida Panthers	SE	82	37	34	11	240	257	85
12	New York Islanders	AT	82	36	40	6	230	278	78
13	Boston Bruins	NE	82	29	37	16	230	266	74
14	Washington Capitals	SE	82	29	41	12	237	306	70
15	Pittsburgh Penguins	AT	82	22	46	14	244	316	58

Divisions: AT – Atlantic, NE – Northeast, SE – Southeast

Z – Clinched conference; Y – Clinched division; X – Clinched playoff spot

== Playoffs ==
=== Eastern Conference Quarterfinals ===
The first two games of the series were held at Continental Airlines Arena in New Jersey. The Devils took commanding victories in Games 1 and 2, 6–1 and 4–1, respectively. Games 3 and 4 were held at Madison Square Garden. The Devils won Game 3 (3–0) and swept the series in Game 4 by a score of 4–2.

=== Eastern Conference Semifinals ===
The series opened at RBC Center in Raleigh. The Hurricanes won Game 1, 6–0, and Game 2, 3–2, in overtime. Games 3 and 4 shifted to Continental Airlines Arena. The Hurricanes took a 3–2 win in Game 3, but the Devils won 5–1 in Game 4. Game 5 shifted back to Raleigh and Carolina beat New Jersey 4–1, winning the series 4–1.

== Schedule and results ==
=== Preseason ===
2005 preseason
Preseason: 3–2–0 (home: 3–0–0; road: 0–2–0)

Game	Date	Score	Opponent	Record	Recap
1	September 25, 2005	3–2 SO	New York Islanders	1–0–0	W
2	September 27, 2005	3–1	New York Rangers	2–0–0	W
3	September 29, 2005	2–3	@ Philadelphia Flyers	2–1–0	L
4	September 30, 2005	5–3	Philadelphia Flyers	3–1–0	W
5	October 2, 2005	2–3	@ New York Rangers	3–2–0	L

Legend: W Win (2 points) L Loss (0 points) OTL Overtime/shootout loss (1 point)

=== Regular season ===
2005–06 regular season
October: 6–5–0 (home: 4–2–0; road: 2–3–0)

Game	Date	Score	Opponent	Record	Recap
1	October 5, 2005	5–1	Pittsburgh Penguins (2005–06)	1–0–0	W
2	October 7, 2005	2–5	@ Philadelphia Flyers (2005–06)	1–1–0	L
3	October 8, 2005	3–2 OT	New York Rangers (2005–06)	2–1–0	W
4	October 13, 2005	1–4	@ New York Rangers (2005–06)	2–2–0	L
5	October 15, 2005	1–6	Carolina Hurricanes (2005–06)	2–3–0	L
6	October 18, 2005	4–3	Florida Panthers (2005–06)	3–3–0	W
7	October 20, 2005	6–3	@ Pittsburgh Penguins (2005–06)	4–3–0	W
8	October 22, 2005	3–4	@ Atlanta Thrashers (2005–06)	4–4–0	L
9	October 26, 2005	3–6	Tampa Bay Lightning (2005–06)	4–5–0	L
10	October 28, 2005	3–2	Buffalo Sabres (2005–06)	5–5–0	W
11	October 29, 2005	5–4 SO	@ Boston Bruins (2005–06)	6–5–0	W

November: 6–5–2 (home: 3–2–1; road: 3–3–1)

Game	Date	Score	Opponent	Record	Recap
12	November 1, 2005	3–4 OT	Pittsburgh Penguins (2005–06)	6–5–1	OTL
13	November 3, 2005	2–4	New York Rangers (2005–06)	6–6–1	L
14	November 5, 2005	2–3 SO	@ New York Rangers (2005–06)	6–6–2	OTL
15	November 8, 2005	1–4	New York Islanders (2005–06)	6–7–2	L
16	November 11, 2005	4–3	@ Washington Capitals (2005–06)	7–7–2	W
17	November 12, 2005	3–2	Washington Capitals (2005–06)	8–7–2	W
18	November 15, 2005	1–4	@ Buffalo Sabres (2005–06)	8–8–2	L
19	November 18, 2005	5–3	Montreal Canadiens (2005–06)	9–8–2	W
20	November 19, 2005	4–5	@ Ottawa Senators (2005–06)	9–9–2	L
21	November 23, 2005	5–1	@ Florida Panthers (2005–06)	10–9–2	W
22	November 25, 2005	8–2	@ Tampa Bay Lightning (2005–06)	11–9–2	W
23	November 29, 2005	3–2	Boston Bruins (2005–06)	12–9–2	W
24	November 30, 2005	1–2	@ Philadelphia Flyers (2005–06)	12–10–2	L

December: 4–8–3 (home: 3–3–2; road: 1–5–1)

Game	Date	Score	Opponent	Record	Recap
25	December 3, 2005	3–2 SO	Minnesota Wild (2005–06)	13–10–2	W
26	December 6, 2005	2–5	@ Detroit Red Wings (2005–06)	13–11–2	L
27	December 7, 2005	1–4	Calgary Flames (2005–06)	13–12–2	L
28	December 9, 2005	3–4 SO	Colorado Avalanche (2005–06)	13–12–3	OTL
29	December 11, 2005	2–3 OT	@ Columbus Blue Jackets (2005–06)	13–12–4	OTL
30	December 13, 2005	2–1 SO	Edmonton Oilers (2005–06)	14–12–4	W
31	December 15, 2005	2–3 OT	Atlanta Thrashers (2005–06)	14–12–5	OTL
32	December 17, 2005	1–4	@ Carolina Hurricanes (2005–06)	14–13–5	L
33	December 20, 2005	3–1	@ New York Rangers (2005–06)	15–13–5	W
34	December 21, 2005	2–4	@ New York Islanders (2005–06)	15–14–5	L
35	December 23, 2005	0–1	Atlanta Thrashers (2005–06)	15–15–5	L
36	December 26, 2005	1–2	@ Toronto Maple Leafs (2005–06)	15–16–5	L
37	December 28, 2005	7–2	Washington Capitals (2005–06)	16–16–5	W
38	December 29, 2005	2–6	@ Pittsburgh Penguins (2005–06)	16–17–5	L
39	December 31, 2005	3–6	Toronto Maple Leafs (2005–06)	16–18–5	L

January: 10–2–1 (home: 5–0–0; road: 5–2–1)

Game	Date	Score	Opponent	Record	Recap
40	January 3, 2006	3–0	Florida Panthers (2005–06)	17–18–5	W
41	January 5, 2006	5–4	Montreal Canadiens (2005–06)	18–18–5	W
42	January 7, 2006	3–2	@ Buffalo Sabres (2005–06)	19–18–5	W
43	January 9, 2006	3–0	Philadelphia Flyers (2005–06)	20–18–5	W
44	January 13, 2006	3–0	Vancouver Canucks (2005–06)	21–18–5	W
45	January 15, 2006	3–2 SO	@ Chicago Blackhawks (2005–06)	22–18–5	W
46	January 17, 2006	5–3	@ St. Louis Blues (2005–06)	23–18–5	W
47	January 19, 2006	4–3 SO	@ Nashville Predators (2005–06)	24–18–5	W
48	January 21, 2006	3–2 SO	New York Islanders (2005–06)	25–18–5	W
49	January 22, 2006	1–3	@ New York Rangers (2005–06)	25–19–5	L
50	January 24, 2006	4–0	@ New York Islanders (2005–06)	26–19–5	W
51	January 26, 2006	0–1 OT	@ Tampa Bay Lightning (2005–06)	26–19–6	OTL
52	January 27, 2006	0–4	@ Florida Panthers (2005–06)	26–20–6	L

February: 4–2–0 (home: 3–1–0; road: 1–1–0)

Game	Date	Score	Opponent	Record	Recap
53	February 1, 2006	5–3	Ottawa Senators (2005–06)	27–20–6	W
54	February 3, 2006	3–0	Carolina Hurricanes (2005–06)	28–20–6	W
55	February 4, 2006	2–4	@ Toronto Maple Leafs (2005–06)	28–21–6	L
56	February 7, 2006	7–4	Tampa Bay Lightning (2005–06)	29–21–6	W
57	February 9, 2006	3–2 OT	@ Boston Bruins (2005–06)	30–21–6	W
58	February 11, 2006	1–2	New York Islanders (2005–06)	30–22–6	L

March: 7–5–3 (home: 5–3–0; road: 2–2–3)

Game	Date	Score	Opponent	Record	Recap
59	March 1, 2006	2–1 SO	Philadelphia Flyers (2005–06)	31–22–6	W
60	March 2, 2006	2–3 SO	@ New York Islanders (2005–06)	31–22–7	OTL
61	March 4, 2006	2–1	New York Rangers (2005–06)	32–22–7	W
62	March 7, 2006	1–2 SO	@ New York Islanders (2005–06)	32–22–8	OTL
63	March 10, 2006	4–3 SO	@ Washington Capitals (2005–06)	33–22–8	W
64	March 11, 2006	3–6	@ Pittsburgh Penguins (2005–06)	33–23–8	L
65	March 14, 2006	1–6	New York Islanders (2005–06)	33–24–8	L
66	March 16, 2006	2–1	Pittsburgh Penguins (2005–06)	34–24–8	W
67	March 19, 2006	0–4	Ottawa Senators (2005–06)	34–25–8	L
68	March 21, 2006	1–2	@ Philadelphia Flyers (2005–06)	34–26–8	L
69	March 23, 2006	5–6 OT	@ Atlanta Thrashers (2005–06)	34–26–9	OTL
70	March 24, 2006	4–2	Boston Bruins (2005–06)	35–26–9	W
71	March 26, 2006	3–4	Toronto Maple Leafs (2005–06)	35–27–9	L
72	March 28, 2006	3–2 SO	@ Ottawa Senators (2005–06)	36–27–9	W
73	March 30, 2006	3–1	Buffalo Sabres (2005–06)	37–27–9	W

April: 9–0–0 (home: 4–0–0; road: 5–0–0)

Game	Date	Score	Opponent	Record	Recap
74	April 1, 2006	4–1	@ Philadelphia Flyers (2005–06)	38–27–9	W
75	April 2, 2006	3–2 OT	@ Pittsburgh Penguins (2005–06)	39–27–9	W
76	April 5, 2006	6–4	Pittsburgh Penguins (2005–06)	40–27–9	W
77	April 8, 2006	3–2	@ Montreal Canadiens (2005–06)	41–27–9	W
78	April 9, 2006	3–2	New York Rangers (2005–06)	42–27–9	W
79	April 11, 2006	4–3 OT	@ Carolina Hurricanes (2005–06)	43–27–9	W
80	April 13, 2006	4–1	Philadelphia Flyers (2005–06)	44–27–9	W
81	April 16, 2006	5–1	Philadelphia Flyers (2005–06)	45–27–9	W
82	April 18, 2006	4–3	@ Montreal Canadiens (2005–06)	46–27–9	W

Legend: W Win (2 points) L Loss (0 points) OTL Overtime/shootout loss (1 point)

=== Playoffs ===
2006 Stanley Cup playoffs
Eastern Conference Quarterfinals vs. (6) New York Rangers – Devils win 4–0

Game	Date	Score	Opponent	Attendance	Series	Recap
1	April 22, 2006	6–1	New York Rangers	19,040	Devils lead 1–0	W
2	April 24, 2006	4–1	New York Rangers	19,040	Devils lead 2–0	W
3	April 26, 2006	3–0	@ New York Rangers	18,200	Devils lead 3–0	W
4	April 29, 2006	4–2	@ New York Rangers	18,200	Devils win 4–0	W

Eastern Conference Semifinals vs. (2) Carolina Hurricanes – Hurricanes win 4–1

Game	Date	Score	Opponent	Attendance	Series	Recap
1	May 6, 2006	0–6	@ Carolina Hurricanes	18,730	Hurricanes lead 1–0	L
2	May 8, 2006	2–3 OT	@ Carolina Hurricanes	18,730	Hurricanes lead 2–0	L
3	May 10, 2006	2–3	Carolina Hurricanes	16,862	Hurricanes lead 3–0	L
4	May 13, 2006	5–1	Carolina Hurricanes	17,585	Hurricanes lead 3–1	W
5	May 14, 2006	1–4	@ Carolina Hurricanes	18,730	Hurricanes win 4–1	L

Legend: W Win L Loss

== Player statistics ==
=== Scoring ===
- Position abbreviations: C = Center; D = Defense; G = Goaltender; LW = Left wing; RW = Right wing
- † = Joined team via a transaction (e.g., trade, waivers, signing) during the season. Stats reflect time with the Devils only.
- ‡ = Left team via a transaction (e.g., trade, waivers, release) during the season. Stats reflect time with the Devils only.

No.	Player	Pos	Regular season						Playoffs					
No.	Player	Pos	GP	G	A	Pts	+/-	PIM	GP	G	A	Pts	+/-	PIM
14	Brian Gionta	RW	82	48	41	89	18	46	9	3	4	7	−1	2
23	Scott Gomez	C	82	33	51	84	8	42	9	5	4	9	−1	6
15	Jamie Langenbrunner	RW	80	19	34	53	−1	74	9	3	10	13	5	16
28	Brian Rafalski	D	82	6	43	49	0	36	9	1	8	9	3	2
26	Patrik Elias	LW	38	16	29	45	11	20	9	6	10	16	5	4
18	Sergei Brylin	LW	82	15	22	37	−4	46	9	2	0	2	5	2
7	Paul Martin	D	80	5	32	37	1	32	9	0	3	3	6	4
11	John Madden	C	82	16	20	36	−7	36	9	4	1	5	2	8
9	Zach Parise	LW	81	14	18	32	−1	28	9	1	2	3	0	2
22	Viktor Kozlov	C	69	12	13	25	0	16	3	0	0	0	−1	0
89	Alexander Mogilny	RW	34	12	13	25	−7	6	—	—	—	—	—	—
29	Grant Marshall	RW	76	8	17	25	−18	70	7	0	1	1	0	8
20	Jay Pandolfo	LW	82	10	10	20	2	16	9	1	4	5	1	0
5	Colin White	D	73	3	14	17	−2	91	4	0	0	0	0	4
8	Sean Brown‡	D	35	1	11	12	−14	27	—	—	—	—	—	—
24	Richard Matvichuk	D	62	1	10	11	2	40	7	0	0	0	5	4
10	Erik Rasmussen	C	67	5	5	10	−4	32	9	0	0	0	−1	8
2	Vladimir Malakhov‡	D	29	4	5	9	−9	26	—	—	—	—	—	—
21	Brad Lukowich†	D	18	1	7	8	3	8	9	0	0	0	0	4
6	Tommy Albelin†	D	36	0	6	6	4	2	2	0	0	0	0	2
2 (Note: McGillis originally wore number 6 and switched numbers when Albelin was signed.)	Dan McGillis	D	27	0	6	6	−5	36	—	—	—	—	—	—
2	David Hale	D	38	0	4	4	5	21	8	0	2	2	−1	12
30	Martin Brodeur	G	73	0	3	3		4	9	0	0	0		2
19	Tuomas Pihlman	LW	11	1	1	2	−1	10	—	—	—	—	—	—
27 (Note: Tallackson wore number 19 in his first two games.)	Barry Tallackson	RW	10	1	1	2	−2	2	—	—	—	—	—	—
16	Alexander Suglobov‡	RW	1	1	0	1	−2	0	—	—	—	—	—	—
16	Jason Wiemer†	C	16	1	0	1	−1	38	8	0	0	0	0	16
17	Darren Langdon	LW	14	0	1	1	−3	22	—	—	—	—	—	—
40	Scott Clemmensen	G	13	0	0	0		0	1	0	0	0		0
25	Cam Janssen	RW	47	0	0	0	−3	91	9	0	0	0	0	26
8	Ken Klee†	D	18	0	0	0	−3	14	6	1	0	1	−1	6
19	Krzysztof Oliwa	LW	3	0	0	0	−2	0	—	—	—	—	—	—
21	Pascal Rheaume‡	C	12	0	0	0	−6	4	—	—	—	—	—	—
19	Jason Ryznar	LW	8	0	0	0	−1	2	—	—	—	—	—	—

=== Goaltending ===
No.	Player	Regular season										Playoffs								
No.	Player	GP	W	L	OT	SA	GA	GAA	SV%	SO	TOI	GP	W	L	SA	GA	GAA	SV%	SO	TOI
30	Martin Brodeur	73	43	23	7	2105	187	2.57	.911	5	4365	9	5	4	261	20	2.25	.923	1	533
40	Scott Clemmensen	13	3	4	2	295	35	3.35	.881	0	627	1	0	0	3	0	0.00	1.000	0	7

== Awards and records ==
=== Awards ===
Martin Brodeur also finished second in voting for the Vezina Trophy.

Type	Award/honor	Recipient	Ref
League (annual)	NHL Second All-Star Team	Martin Brodeur (Goaltender)	
League (in-season)	NHL Defensive Player of the Month	Martin Brodeur (January)	
League (in-season)	NHL Defensive Player of the Week	Martin Brodeur (January 18)	
League (in-season)	NHL Offensive Player of the Week	Scott Gomez (April 9)	
Team	Devils' Players' Player	Jay Pandolfo	
Team	Hugh Delano Unsung Hero	Jay Pandolfo	
Team	Most Valuable Devil	Brian Gionta	
Team	Three-Star Award	Brian Gionta	

=== Milestones ===
Milestone	Player	Date	Ref
First game	Zach Parise	October 5, 2005	
First game	Cam Janssen	November 5, 2005	
First game	Barry Tallackson	November 12, 2005	
First game	Jason Ryznar	January 24, 2006	

== Transactions ==
The Devils were involved in the following transactions from February 17, 2005, the day after the 2004–05 NHL season was officially cancelled, through June 19, 2006, the day of the deciding game of the 2006 Stanley Cup Finals.

=== Trades ===
Date	Details		Ref
September 26, 2005	To Washington Capitals: Jeff Friesen	To New Jersey Devils: Conditional draft pick in 2006 (Note: Eventually determined to be a 3rd-round pick.)	
November 25, 2005	To Phoenix Coyotes: Pascal Rheaume; Ray Schultz; Steven Spencer	To New Jersey Devils: Brad Ference	
March 8, 2006	To Toronto Maple Leafs: Aleksander Suglobov	To New Jersey Devils: Ken Klee	
March 9, 2006	To New York Islanders: 3rd-round pick in 2006	To New Jersey Devils: Brad Lukowich	
March 9, 2006	To Vancouver Canucks: Sean Brown	To New Jersey Devils: 4th-round pick in 2006	
March 9, 2006	To Calgary Flames: Conditional 4th-round pick in 2006 (Note: Calgary would receive the later of New Jersey's 4th-round pick or Vancouver's 4th-round pick, which New Jersey had previously acquired. Calgary received New Jersey's original 4th-rounder.)	To New Jersey Devils: Jason Wiemer	

=== Players acquired ===
Date	Player	Former team	Term	Via	Ref
August 4, 2005	Vladimir Malakhov	Philadelphia Flyers	2-year	Free agency	
August 4, 2005	Dan McGillis	Boston Bruins	2-year	Free agency	
August 6, 2005	Bryan Miller	Albany River Rats (AHL)		Free agency	
August 12, 2005	David Clarkson	Kitchener Rangers (OHL)		Free agency	
August 12, 2005	Frank Doyle	Idaho Steelheads (ECHL)		Free agency	
August 16, 2005	Alexander Mogilny	Toronto Maple Leafs	2-year	Free agency	
April 4, 2006	Andy Greene	Miami University (CCHA)		Free agency	

=== Players lost ===
Date	Player	New team	Via (Note: In parentheses is the player's free agency group on August 1 if applicable.)	Ref
N/A	Matus Kostur	HK Riga 2000 (BHL)	Free agency (UFA)	
June 3, 2005	Jiri Bicek	Leksands IF (SHL)	Free agency (UFA)	
June 17, 2005	Eric Johansson	Mora IK (SHL)	Free agency (UFA)	
August 4, 2005	Scott Niedermayer	Anaheim Mighty Ducks	Free agency (III)	
August 10, 2005	Jan Hrdina	Columbus Blue Jackets	Free agency (UFA)	
August 19, 2005	Brett Clouthier	Ottawa Senators	Free agency (UFA)	
September 6, 2005	Scott Stevens		Retirement (III)	
September 14, 2005	Phil Cole	Augusta Lynx (ECHL)	Free agency (UFA)	
September 26, 2005	Rob Skrlac		Retirement (VI)	
December 19, 2005	Vladimir Malakhov		Retirement	
April 26, 2006	Teemu Kesa	HC TPS (Liiga)	Free agency	
May 15, 2006	Ari Ahonen	Espoo Blues (Liiga)	Free agency	
May 17, 2006	Ilkka Pikkarainen	HIFK (Liiga)	Free agency (Note: New Jersey retained Pikkarainen's NHL rights and re-signed him on July 2, 2009.)	

=== Signings ===
Date	Player	Term	Contract type	Ref
August 4, 2005	Brian Rafalski	2-year	Re-signing	
August 12, 2005	Sean Brown		Re-signing	
August 12, 2005	Brian Gionta	1-year	Re-signing	
August 12, 2005	Scott Gomez	1-year	Re-signing	
August 12, 2005	Viktor Kozlov	1-year	Re-signing	
August 12, 2005	Jamie Langenbrunner	1-year	Re-signing	
August 12, 2005	Jason Ryznar		Entry-level	
August 12, 2005	Barry Tallackson		Entry-level	
August 17, 2005	Ari Ahonen		Re-signing	
August 23, 2005	Patrik Elias	1-year	Re-signing	
September 21, 2005	Jeff Friesen		Re-signing	
September 21, 2005	Paul Martin		Re-signing	
September 21, 2005	Colin White		Re-signing	
September 24, 2005	Krisjanis Redlihs		Re-signing	
September 28, 2005	Matt DeMarchi		Re-signing	
September 29, 2005	David Hale		Re-signing	
September 29, 2005	Ilkka Pikkarainen		Re-signing	
October 3, 2005	Niclas Bergfors	3-year	Entry-level	
December 20, 2005	Tommy Albelin		Re-signing (Note: Albelin came out of retirement.)	
January 27, 2006	Martin Brodeur	6-year	Extension	
April 14, 2006	Travis Zajac		Entry-level	
June 5, 2006	Patrick Davis		Entry-level	
June 5, 2006	Mark Fraser		Entry-level	
June 5, 2006	Sean Zimmerman		Entry-level	

== Draft picks ==
New Jersey's picks at the 2005 NHL entry draft at The Westin Ottawa in Ottawa, Ottawa.

Rd #	Pick #	Player	Nat	Pos	Team (League)	Notes
1	23	Nicklas Bergfors	Sweden	RW	Södertälje SK (Elitserien)	
2	38	Jeff Frazee	United States	G	US National Team Development Program	
3	84	Mark Fraser	Canada	D	Kitchener Rangers (OHL)	
4	99	Patrick Davis	United States	LW	Kitchener Rangers (OHL)	
5	155	Mark Fayne	United States	D	Noble and Greenough School (USHS–MA)	
6	170	Sean Zimmerman	United States	D	Spokane Chiefs (WHL)	
7	218	Alexander Sundstrom	Sweden	C	IF Björklöven (Allsvenskan)	

== Media ==
Television broadcasts were now under the Fox Sports Networks (aka FSN) with Mike Emrick commentating the play-by-play, Chico Resch serving as color commentator, and Matt Loughlin serving as the TV host. Radio broadcasts were now on WFAN (AM) 660 still called John Hennessy as play-by-play commentator with Randy Velischek as color commentator. This was Hennessy's final season as a radio play-by-play commentator for the Devils, as Loughlin took his place the following season. This was also Velischek's final season as a radio color commentator as Sherry Ross returned the following year.

== See also ==
- 2005–06 NHL season
