= Wade Skolney =

Canadian ice hockey player

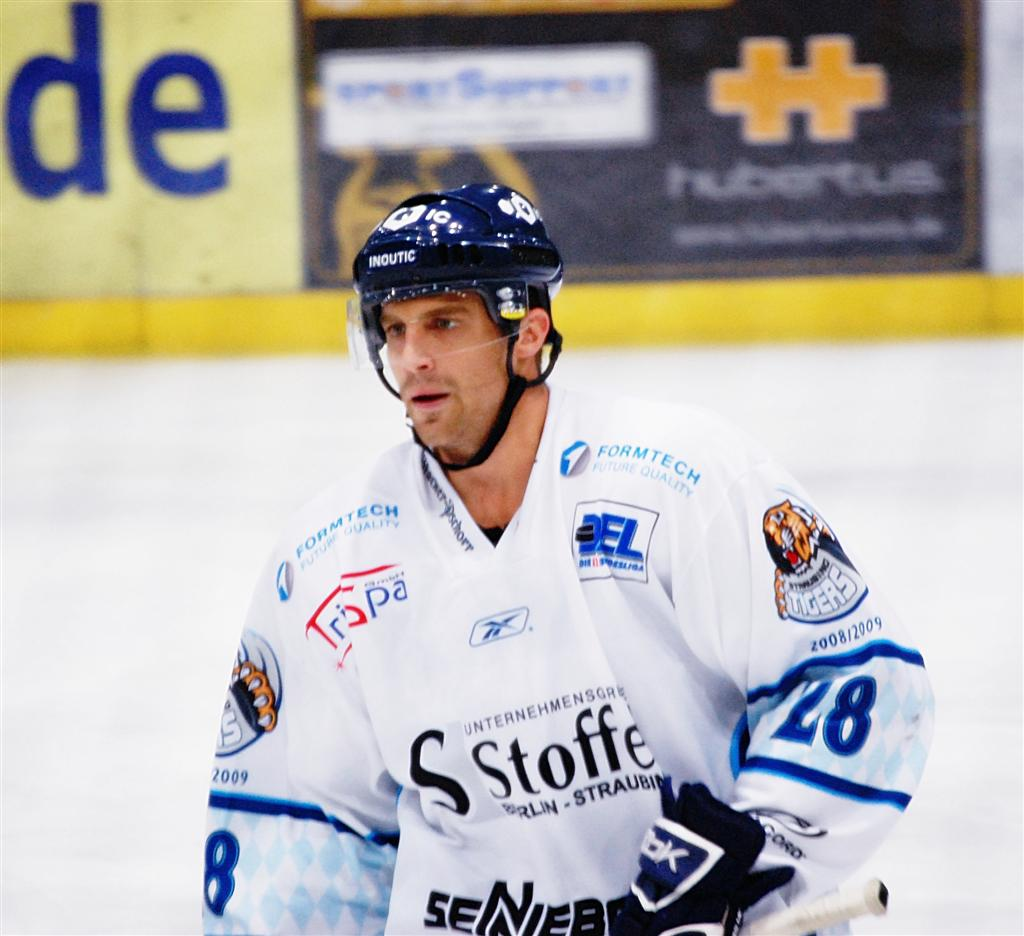
- Born: June 24, 1981 (age 43); Humboldt, Saskatchewan, Canada
- Height: 6 ft 0 in (183 cm)
- Weight: 195 lb (88 kg; 13 st 13 lb)
- Position: Defence
- Shot: Right
- Played for: Philadelphia Phantoms; Philadelphia Flyers; Wilkes-Barre Scranton Penguins; Straubing Tigers; Acroni Jesenice
- NHL draft: Undrafted
- Playing career: 2002–2011

Wade Skolney (born June 24, 1981) is a Canadian former professional ice hockey player. He played one game in the National Hockey League (NHL) for the Philadelphia Flyers during the 2005–06 season. The rest of his career, which lasted from 2002 to 2011, was mainly spent in the American Hockey League.

== Playing career ==
Skolney signed with the Flyers as an undrafted free agent on May 20, 2002. He spent four seasons with the AHL's Philadelphia Phantoms, winning the Calder Cup in the 2004–05 season. He played in only one game for the Flyers.

Skolney spent his final three professional seasons in Europe, playing for the Straubing Tigers of the Deutsche Eishockey Liga from 2007 to 2009 and Acroni Jesenice of the Austrian Erste Bank Eishockey Liga during the 2010–11 season.

== Career statistics ==
=== Regular season and playoffs ===
| | | | Regular season | | | | | Playoffs |
| Season | Team | League | GP | G | A | Pts | PIM | GP | G | A | Pts | PIM |
|---|---|---|---|---|---|---|---|---|---|---|---|---|
| 1996–97 | Brandon Wheat Kings | WHL | 1 | 0 | 0 | 0 | 0 | — | — | — | — | — |
| 1997–98 | Brandon Wheat Kings | WHL | 42 | 1 | 11 | 12 | 49 | 3 | 0 | 0 | 0 | 0 |
| 1998–99 | Brandon Wheat Kings | WHL | 39 | 3 | 10 | 13 | 60 | 5 | 0 | 1 | 1 | 16 |
| 1999–00 | Brandon Wheat Kings | WHL | 13 | 0 | 2 | 2 | 23 | — | — | — | — | — |
| 2000–01 | Brandon Wheat Kings | WHL | 28 | 2 | 9 | 11 | 37 | — | — | — | — | — |
| 2001–02 | Brandon Wheat Kings | WHL | 50 | 4 | 12 | 16 | 179 | 19 | 2 | 7 | 9 | 56 |
| 2002–03 | Philadelphia Phantoms | AHL | 68 | 2 | 7 | 9 | 102 | — | — | — | — | — |
| 2003–04 | Philadelphia Phantoms | AHL | 56 | 1 | 8 | 9 | 106 | 12 | 0 | 0 | 0 | 23 |
| 2004–05 | Philadelphia Phantoms | AHL | 35 | 0 | 8 | 8 | 104 | 21 | 0 | 1 | 1 | 43 |
| 2005–06 | Philadelphia Phantoms | AHL | 56 | 0 | 5 | 5 | 197 | — | — | — | — | — |
| 2005–06 | Philadelphia Flyers | NHL | 1 | 0 | 0 | 0 | 2 | — | — | — | — | — |
| 2006–07 | Wilkes-Barre/Scranton Penguins | AHL | 62 | 1 | 6 | 7 | 216 | 11 | 0 | 2 | 2 | 8 |
| 2007–08 | Straubing Tigers | DEL | 52 | 1 | 6 | 7 | 101 | — | — | — | — | — |
| 2008–09 | Straubing Tigers | DEL | 46 | 1 | 5 | 6 | 95 | — | — | — | — | — |
| 2010–11 | HK Acroni Jesenice | EBEL | 18 | 2 | 2 | 4 | 62 | — | — | — | — | — |
| AHL totals | | | 277 | 4 | 34 | 38 | 725 | 44 | 0 | 3 | 3 | 74 |
| NHL totals | | | 1 | 0 | 0 | 0 | 2 | — | — | — | — | — |

== See also ==
- List of players who played only one game in the NHL
