= 2005–06 Tampa Bay Lightning season =

National Hockey League team season

2005–06 Tampa Bay Lightning
- Division: 2nd Southeast
- Conference: 8th Eastern
- 2005–06 record: 43–33–6
- Home record: 25–15–2
- Road record: 18–18–4
- Goals for: 252
- Goals against: 260

Team information
- General manager: Jay Feaster
- Coach: John Tortorella
- Captain: Dave Andreychuk (Oct.–Jan.); Vacant (Jan.–Apr.)
- Alternate captains: Vincent Lecavalier; Brad Richards; Tim Taylor (Jan.–Apr.)
- Arena: St. Pete Times Forum
- Average attendance: 20,509
- Minor league affiliates: Springfield Falcons; Johnstown Chiefs

Team leaders
- Goals: Vincent Lecavalier (35)
- Assists: Brad Richards (68)
- Points: Brad Richards (91)
- Penalty minutes: Pavel Kubina (96)
- Plus/minus: Nolan Pratt (+7)
- Wins: John Grahame (29)
- Goals against average: Sean Burke (2.80)

The 2005–06 Tampa Bay Lightning season was the 14th National Hockey League season in Tampa, Florida. Due to the cancellation of the 2004–05 season, the Lightning entered the season as defending Stanley Cup champions, which they won in 2003–04.

== Regular season ==
=== Final standings ===
Southeast Division
No.	CR		GP	W	L	OTL	GF	GA	Pts
1	2	**Carolina Hurricanes**	82	52	22	8	294	260	112
2	8	**Tampa Bay Lightning**	82	43	33	6	252	260	92
3	10	Atlanta Thrashers	82	41	33	8	281	275	90
4	11	Florida Panthers	82	37	34	11	240	257	85
5	14	Washington Capitals	82	29	41	12	237	306	70

Note: CR = Conference rank; GP = Games played; W = Wins; L = Losses; T = Ties; OTL = Overtime loss; GF = Goals for; GA = Goals against; Pts = Points
Bolded teams qualified for the playoffs.

Eastern Conference
R		Div	GP	W	L	OTL	GF	GA	Pts
**1**	**Z-** Ottawa Senators	**NE**	**82**	**52**	**21**	**9**	**314**	**211**	113
**2**	**Y-** Carolina Hurricanes	**SE**	**82**	**52**	**22**	**8**	**294**	**260**	112
**3**	**Y-** New Jersey Devils	**AT**	**82**	**46**	**27**	**9**	**242**	**229**	101
**4**	**X-** Buffalo Sabres	**NE**	**82**	**52**	**24**	**6**	**242**	**239**	110
**5**	**X-** Philadelphia Flyers	**AT**	**82**	**45**	**26**	**11**	**267**	**259**	101
**6**	**X-** New York Rangers	**AT**	**82**	**44**	**26**	**12**	**257**	**215**	100
**7**	**X-** Montreal Canadiens	**NE**	**82**	**42**	**31**	**9**	**243**	**247**	93
**8**	**X-** Tampa Bay Lightning	**SE**	**82**	**43**	**33**	**6**	**252**	**260**	92
8.5
9	Toronto Maple Leafs	NE	82	41	33	8	257	270	90
10	Atlanta Thrashers	SE	82	41	33	8	281	275	90
11	Florida Panthers	SE	82	37	34	11	240	257	85
12	New York Islanders	AT	82	36	40	6	230	278	78
13	Boston Bruins	NE	82	29	37	16	230	266	74
14	Washington Capitals	SE	82	29	41	12	237	306	70
15	Pittsburgh Penguins	AT	82	22	46	14	244	316	58

Divisions: AT – Atlantic, NE – Northeast, SE – Southeast

Z – Clinched conference; Y – Clinched division; X – Clinched playoff spot

== Playoffs ==
The Tampa Bay Lightning ended the 2005–06 regular season as the Eastern Conference's eighth seed.

== Schedule and results ==
=== Regular season ===
2005–06 regular season
October: 7–3–2 (home: 3–3–1; road: 4–0–1)

Game	Date	Score	Opponent	Record	Recap
1	October 5, 2005	5–2	Carolina Hurricanes (2005–06)	1–0–0	W
2	October 7, 2005	0–2	Florida Panthers (2005–06)	1–1–0	L
3	October 8, 2005	2–1	Florida Panthers (2005–06)	2–1–0	W
4	October 10, 2005	2–4	Boston Bruins (2005–06)	2–2–0	L
5	October 13, 2005	3–4 SO	Buffalo Sabres (2005–06)	2–2–1	OTL
6	October 15, 2005	3–1	@ Pittsburgh Penguins (2005–06)	3–2–1	W
7	October 16, 2005	2–3 SO	@ Washington Capitals (2005–06)	3–2–2	OTL
8	October 20, 2005	6–0	@ Atlanta Thrashers (2005–06)	4–2–2	W
9	October 21, 2005	1–4	Ottawa Senators (2005–06)	4–3–2	L
10	October 26, 2005	6–3	@ New Jersey Devils (2005–06)	5–3–2	W
11	October 28, 2005	4–2	Washington Capitals (2005–06)	6–3–2	W
12	October 29, 2005	3–2	@ Atlanta Thrashers (2005–06)	7–3–2	W

November: 7–7–1 (home: 4–3–0; road: 3–4–1)

Game	Date	Score	Opponent	Record	Recap
13	November 1, 2005	4–6	Atlanta Thrashers (2005–06)	7–4–2	L
14	November 3, 2005	2–4	@ Ottawa Senators (2005–06)	7–5–2	L
15	November 5, 2005	3–5	@ Toronto Maple Leafs (2005–06)	7–6–2	L
16	November 8, 2005	2–3	@ Montreal Canadiens (2005–06)	7–7–2	L
17	November 10, 2005	2–5	New York Rangers (2005–06)	7–8–2	L
18	November 11, 2005	2–5	@ Atlanta Thrashers (2005–06)	7–9–2	L
19	November 14, 2005	5–2	Philadelphia Flyers (2005–06)	8–9–2	W
20	November 15, 2005	3–4 SO	@ Washington Capitals (2005–06)	8–9–3	OTL
21	November 17, 2005	3–2	New York Islanders (2005–06)	9–9–3	W
22	November 20, 2005	5–2	@ Carolina Hurricanes (2005–06)	10–9–3	W
23	November 22, 2005	4–2	@ Philadelphia Flyers (2005–06)	11–9–3	W
24	November 23, 2005	4–3 SO	@ Washington Capitals (2005–06)	12–9–3	W
25	November 25, 2005	2–8	New Jersey Devils (2005–06)	12–10–3	L
26	November 27, 2005	4–1	Pittsburgh Penguins (2005–06)	13–10–3	W
27	November 30, 2005	2–1	Toronto Maple Leafs (2005–06)	14–10–3	W

December: 5–7–0 (home: 4–4–0; road: 1–3–0)

Game	Date	Score	Opponent	Record	Recap
28	December 2, 2005	3–2 SO	Chicago Blackhawks (2005–06)	15–10–3	W
29	December 8, 2005	5–4	St. Louis Blues (2005–06)	16–10–3	W
30	December 10, 2005	4–3	Nashville Predators (2005–06)	17–10–3	W
31	December 14, 2005	2–4	@ Mighty Ducks of Anaheim (2005–06)	17–11–3	L
32	December 15, 2005	3–1	@ Phoenix Coyotes (2005–06)	18–11–3	W
33	December 17, 2005	3–6	Detroit Red Wings (2005–06)	18–12–3	L
34	December 20, 2005	4–6	@ Carolina Hurricanes (2005–06)	18–13–3	L
35	December 22, 2005	2–4	@ New York Rangers (2005–06)	18–14–3	L
36	December 23, 2005	1–4	Buffalo Sabres (2005–06)	18–15–3	L
37	December 26, 2005	5–4 OT	Carolina Hurricanes (2005–06)	19–15–3	W
38	December 28, 2005	3–4	Montreal Canadiens (2005–06)	19–16–3	L
39	December 30, 2005	1–2	Boston Bruins (2005–06)	19–17–3	L

January: 9–4–1 (home: 3–0–1; road: 6–4–0)

Game	Date	Score	Opponent	Record	Recap
40	January 2, 2006	2–1	@ New York Islanders (2005–06)	20–17–3	W
41	January 3, 2006	1–0 OT	@ New York Rangers (2005–06)	21–17–3	W
42	January 5, 2006	1–3	@ Buffalo Sabres (2005–06)	21–18–3	L
43	January 7, 2006	3–6	@ Boston Bruins (2005–06)	21–19–3	L
44	January 13, 2006	4–2	Columbus Blue Jackets (2005–06)	22–19–3	W
45	January 16, 2006	1–3	@ San Jose Sharks (2005–06)	22–20–3	L
46	January 17, 2006	4–1	@ Los Angeles Kings (2005–06)	23–20–3	W
47	January 20, 2006	6–3	@ Dallas Stars (2005–06)	24–20–3	W
48	January 21, 2006	2–0	@ Atlanta Thrashers (2005–06)	25–20–3	W
49	January 24, 2006	2–3 OT	Florida Panthers (2005–06)	25–20–4	OTL
50	January 26, 2006	1–0 OT	New Jersey Devils (2005–06)	26–20–4	W
51	January 28, 2006	6–0	@ Philadelphia Flyers (2005–06)	27–20–4	W
52	January 29, 2006	1–2	@ Washington Capitals (2005–06)	27–21–4	L
53	January 31, 2006	3–2 SO	Toronto Maple Leafs (2005–06)	28–21–4	W

February: 4–2–0 (home: 2–1–0; road: 2–1–0)

Game	Date	Score	Opponent	Record	Recap
54	February 4, 2006	5–0	Washington Capitals (2005–06)	29–21–4	W
55	February 6, 2006	3–2 OT	@ New York Islanders (2005–06)	30–21–4	W
56	February 7, 2006	4–7	@ New Jersey Devils (2005–06)	30–22–4	L
57	February 9, 2006	5–3	Carolina Hurricanes (2005–06)	31–22–4	W
58	February 11, 2006	6–5	@ Boston Bruins (2005–06)	32–22–4	W
59	February 28, 2006	2–8	Florida Panthers (2005–06)	32–23–4	L

March: 7–6–1 (home: 5–2–0; road: 2–4–1)

Game	Date	Score	Opponent	Record	Recap
60	March 4, 2006	2–6	Montreal Canadiens (2005–06)	32–24–4	L
61	March 6, 2006	0–4	Ottawa Senators (2005–06)	32–25–4	L
62	March 7, 2006	5–4 SO	@ Pittsburgh Penguins (2005–06)	33–25–4	W
63	March 9, 2006	5–8	@ Buffalo Sabres (2005–06)	33–26–4	L
64	March 11, 2006	1–5	@ Toronto Maple Leafs (2005–06)	33–27–4	L
65	March 13, 2006	2–1	@ Montreal Canadiens (2005–06)	34–27–4	W
66	March 14, 2006	3–4	@ Ottawa Senators (2005–06)	34–28–4	L
67	March 17, 2006	6–3	Philadelphia Flyers (2005–06)	35–28–4	W
68	March 19, 2006	5–2	New York Islanders (2005–06)	36–28–4	W
69	March 20, 2006	5–6 OT	@ Florida Panthers (2005–06)	36–28–5	OTL
70	March 23, 2006	4–3 OT	Washington Capitals (2005–06)	37–28–5	W
71	March 25, 2006	4–3 SO	New York Rangers (2005–06)	38–28–5	W
72	March 27, 2006	1–2	@ Carolina Hurricanes (2005–06)	38–29–5	L
73	March 30, 2006	4–3	Atlanta Thrashers (2005–06)	39–29–5	W

April: 4–4–1 (home: 4–2–0; road: 0–2–1)

Game	Date	Score	Opponent	Record	Recap
74	April 1, 2006	2–4	@ Florida Panthers (2005–06)	39–30–5	L
75	April 3, 2006	4–1	Florida Panthers (2005–06)	40–30–5	W
76	April 6, 2006	3–2 SO	Atlanta Thrashers (2005–06)	41–30–5	W
77	April 8, 2006	1–0	Pittsburgh Penguins (2005–06)	42–30–5	W
78	April 9, 2006	3–6	@ Florida Panthers (2005–06)	42–31–5	L
79	April 11, 2006	2–6	Atlanta Thrashers (2005–06)	42–32–5	L
80	April 14, 2006	4–5 SO	@ Carolina Hurricanes (2005–06)	42–32–6	OTL
81	April 15, 2006	3–2 OT	Carolina Hurricanes (2005–06)	43–32–6	W
82	April 18, 2006	1–4	Washington Capitals (2005–06)	43–33–6	L

Legend: W Win (2 points) L Loss (0 points) OTL Overtime/shootout loss (1 point)

=== Playoffs ===
2006 Stanley Cup playoffs
Eastern Conference Quarterfinals vs. (1) Ottawa Senators – Senators win 4–1

Game	Date	Visitor	Score	Home	Attendance	Series	Recap
1	April 21, 2006	Tampa Bay	1–4	Ottawa	19,660	Senators lead 1–0	L
2	April 23, 2006	Tampa Bay	4–3	Ottawa	19,745	Series tied 1–1	W
3	April 25, 2006	Ottawa	8–4	Tampa Bay	20,815	Senators lead 2–1	L
4	April 27, 2006	Ottawa	5–2	Tampa Bay	20,682	Senators lead 3–1	L
5	April 29, 2006	Tampa Bay	2–3	Ottawa	20,004	Senators win 4–1	L

Legend: W Win L Loss

== Player statistics ==
=== Scoring ===
- Position abbreviations: C = Center; D = Defense; G = Goaltender; LW = Left wing; RW = Right wing
- ‡ = Left team via a transaction (e.g., trade, waivers, release) during the season. Stats reflect time with the Lightning only.

No.	Player	Pos	Regular season						Playoffs					
No.	Player	Pos	GP	G	A	Pts	+/-	PIM	GP	G	A	Pts	+/-	PIM
19	Brad Richards	C	82	23	68	91	0	32	5	3	5	8	−5	6
20	Vaclav Prospal	LW	81	25	55	80	−3	50	5	0	2	2	1	0
4	Vincent Lecavalier	C	80	35	40	75	0	90	5	1	3	4	0	7
26	Martin St. Louis	RW	80	31	30	61	−3	38	5	4	0	4	−2	2
33	Fredrik Modin	LW	77	31	23	54	5	56	5	0	0	0	−6	6
22	Dan Boyle	D	79	15	38	53	−8	38	5	1	3	4	−1	6
17	Ruslan Fedotenko	LW	80	26	15	41	−4	44	5	0	0	0	−1	20
13	Pavel Kubina	D	76	5	33	38	−12	96	5	1	1	2	−6	26
34	Ryan Craig	C	48	15	13	28	−4	6	5	0	0	0	−3	10
5	Darryl Sydor	D	80	4	19	23	−18	30	5	0	1	1	−3	0
25	Dave Andreychuk‡	LW	42	6	12	18	−13	16	—	—	—	—	—	—
54	Paul Ranger	D	76	1	17	18	5	58	5	2	4	6	0	0
76	Evgeny Artyukhin	RW	72	4	13	17	−4	90	5	1	0	1	1	6
18	Rob DiMaio	RW	61	4	13	17	−7	30	2	0	0	0	−1	0
29	Dmitri Afanasenkov	LW	68	9	6	15	−7	16	5	0	1	1	−1	2
21	Cory Sarich	D	82	1	14	15	−2	79	5	0	1	1	−1	4
27	Tim Taylor	C	82	7	6	13	−12	22	5	0	0	0	−2	2
44	Nolan Pratt	D	82	0	9	9	7	60	5	0	0	0	0	7
8	Martin Cibak	C	65	2	6	8	−9	22	5	0	0	0	−1	0
14	Norm Milley	RW	14	2	1	3	−2	4	—	—	—	—	—	—
1	Sean Burke	G	35	0	1	1		10	3	0	0	0		0
11	Chris Dingman	LW	34	0	1	1	−10	22	3	0	0	0	0	19
47	John Grahame	G	57	0	1	1		14	4	0	0	0		0
2	Timo Helbling	D	9	0	1	1	−3	6	—	—	—	—	—	—
46	Darren Reid	RW	7	0	1	1	−2	0	—	—	—	—	—	—
74	Nick Tarnasky	C	12	0	1	1	−3	4	—	—	—	—	—	—
16	Jim Campbell	RW	1	0	0	0	0	2	—	—	—	—	—	—
50	Gerald Coleman	G	2	0	0	0		0	—	—	—	—	—	—
40	Brian Eklund‡	G	1	0	0	0		0	—	—	—	—	—	—
39	Doug O'Brien	D	5	0	0	0	0	2	—	—	—	—	—	—

=== Goaltending ===
- ‡ = Left team via a transaction (e.g., trade, waivers, release) during the season. Stats reflect time with the Lightning only.

No.	Player	Regular season										Playoffs								
No.	Player	GP	W	L	OT	SA	GA	GAA	SV%	SO	TOI	GP	W	L	SA	GA	GAA	SV%	SO	TOI
47	John Grahame	57	29	22	1	1450	161	3.06	.889	5	3152	4	1	3	98	15	4.78	.847	0	188
1	Sean Burke	35	14	10	4	764	80	2.80	.895	2	1713	3	0	1	57	7	3.84	.877	0	109
50	Gerald Coleman	2	0	0	1	17	2	2.77	.882	0	43	—	—	—	—	—	—	—	—	—
40	Brian Eklund‡	1	0	1	0	19	3	3.09	.842	0	58	—	—	—	—	—	—	—	—	—

== Awards and honors ==
=== Milestones ===
Milestone	Player	Date	Ref
First game	Timo Helbling	October 5, 2005	
First game	Paul Ranger	October 15, 2005	
First game	Evgeny Artyukhin	October 20, 2005	
First game	Nick Tarnasky	October 20, 2005	
First game	Brian Eklund	November 8, 2005	
First game	Gerald Coleman	November 11, 2005	
First game	Ryan Craig	December 17, 2005	
First game	Darren Reid	December 17, 2005	
First game	Doug O'Brien	January 29, 2006	
1,000th game played	Darryl Sydor	February 28, 2006	

== Transactions ==
The Lightning were involved in the following transactions from February 17, 2005, the day after the 2004–05 NHL season was officially cancelled, through June 19, 2006, the day of the deciding game of the 2006 Stanley Cup Finals.

=== Trades ===
Date	Details		Ref
July 28, 2005	To Phoenix Coyotes: Jarrod Skalde	To Tampa Bay Lightning: Jason Jaspers	
July 30, 2005	To San Jose Sharks: 5th-round pick in 2005; 4th-round pick in 2006	To Tampa Bay Lightning: 3rd-round pick in 2005	
July 30, 2005	To Philadelphia Flyers: 2nd-round pick in 2006	To Tampa Bay Lightning: Dallas’ 3rd-round pick in 2005; 4th-round pick in 2005	
July 30, 2005	To Dallas Stars: 5th-round pick in 2006	To Tampa Bay Lightning: 6th-round pick in 2005	
September 9, 2005	To Vancouver Canucks: Craig Darby	To Tampa Bay Lightning: Future considerations	
February 8, 2006	To Boston Bruins: Brian Eklund	To Tampa Bay Lightning: Zdenek Blatny	

=== Players acquired ===
Date	Player	Former team	Term	Via	Ref
August 5, 2005	Mitch Fritz	Springfield Falcons (AHL)	1-year	Free agency	
August 9, 2005	Sean Burke	Philadelphia Flyers	2-year	Free agency	
August 9, 2005	Rob DiMaio	Dallas Stars	2-year	Free agency	
August 18, 2005	Jim Campbell	New York Islanders		Free agency	
August 18, 2005	Norm Milley	Buffalo Sabres		Free agency	
August 26, 2005	Morgan Cey	University of Notre Dame (CCHA)	multi-year	Free agency	
September 7, 2005	Todd Rohloff	Buffalo Sabres	1-year	Free agency	
June 1, 2006	Johan Holmqvist	Brynas IF (SHL)	1-year	Free agency	

=== Players lost ===
Date	Player	New team	Via (Note: In parentheses is the player's free agency group on August 1 if applicable.)	Ref
June 22, 2005	Andreas Holmqvist	Linkoping HC (SHL)	Free agency (II) (Note: Tampa Bay retained Holmqvist’s NHL rights through the 2008–09 season.)	
August 4, 2005	Andre Roy	Pittsburgh Penguins	Free agency (V)	
August 5, 2005	Nikolai Khabibulin	Chicago Blackhawks	Free agency (III)	
August 11, 2005	Brad Lukowich	New York Islanders	Free agency (UFA)	
August 12, 2005	Nikita Alexeev	Avangard Omsk (RSL)	Free agency (II) (Note: Tampa Bay retained Alexeev’s NHL rights and re-signed him on July 1, 2006.)	
August 22, 2005	Eric Perrin	SC Bern (NLA)	Free agency (II) (Note: Tampa Bay retained Perrin’s NHL rights and re-signed him on June 14, 2006.)	
August 22, 2005	Jamie Storr	Philadelphia Flyers	Free agency (UFA)	
August 23, 2005	Shane Willis	HC Davos (NLA)	Free agency (II) (Note: Tampa Bay retained Willis’ NHL rights through the 2005–06 season.)	
January 10, 2006	Dave Andreychuk (Note: Andreychuk retired.)		Release	
May 6, 2006	Jim Campbell	EHC Visp (NLA)	Free agency	

=== Signings ===
Date	Player	Term	Contract type	Ref
July 28, 2005	Jonathan Boutin	3-year	Entry-level	
July 28, 2005	Martin Cibak	1-year	Re-signing	
July 28, 2005	Gerald Coleman	3-year	Entry-level	
July 28, 2005	Zbynek Hrdel	3-year	Entry-level	
July 28, 2005	Tim Taylor	multi-year	Re-signing	
July 30, 2005	Ruslan Fedotenko	1-year	Re-signing	
August 5, 2005	Brandon Elliott	3-year	Entry-level	
August 5, 2005	Brady Greco	2-year	Entry-level	
August 5, 2005	Timo Helbling	1-year	Re-signing	
August 5, 2005	Nolan Pratt	2-year	Re-signing	
August 9, 2005	Dmitri Afanasenkov	1-year	Re-signing	
August 9, 2005	Dan Boyle	3-year	Re-signing	
August 16, 2005	Vincent Lecavalier	4-year	Re-signing	
August 18, 2005	Brian Eklund		Re-signing	
August 18, 2005	Jason Jaspers		Re-signing	
August 23, 2005	Marek Kvapil	3-year	Entry-level	
August 23, 2005	John Toffey	multi-year	Entry-level	
August 24, 2005	Martin St. Louis	6-year	Re-signing	
August 25, 2005	Dave Andreychuk	2-year	Re-signing	
August 26, 2005	Jay Rosehill	multi-year	Entry-level	
October 3, 2005	Andy Rogers	3-year	Entry-level	
April 14, 2006	Matt Smaby	3-year	Entry-level	
May 12, 2006	Stanislav Lascek	3-year	Entry-level	
May 22, 2006	Brad Richards	5-year	Re-signing	
May 23, 2006	Justin Keller	3-year	Entry-level	
May 30, 2006	Fredrik Norrena	1-year	Entry-level	
May 31, 2006	Karri Ramo	3-year	Entry-level	
May 31, 2006	Radek Smolenak	3-year	Entry-level	
June 14, 2006	Eric Perrin	1-year	Re-signing	

== Draft picks ==
Tampa's picks at the 2005 NHL entry draft in Ottawa, Ontario.

Round	#	Player	Position	Nationality	College/Junior/Club team (League)
1	32	Vladimir Mihalik	Defense	Slovakia	Pesov II (Slovakia)
3	73	Radek Smolenak	Left wing	Czech Republic	Kingston Frontenacs (OHL)
3	89	Chris Lawrence	Center	Canada	Sault Ste. Marie Greyhounds (OHL)
4	92	Marek Bartanus	Right wing	Slovakia	HC Kosice (Slovakia)
4	102	Blair Jones	Center	Canada	Moose Jaw Warriors (WHL)
5	133	Stanislav Lascek	Right wing	Slovakia	Chicoutimi Saguenéens (QMJHL)
6	163	Marek Kvapil	Right wing	Slovakia	Saginaw Spirit (OHL)
6	165	Kevin Beech	Goaltender	Canada	Sudbury Wolves (OHL)
7	225	John Wessbecker	Defense	United States	Blake School (USHS)

== See also ==
- 2005–06 NHL season
