= 2005–06 Ottawa Senators season =

NHL hockey team season

2005–06 Ottawa Senators
- Northeast Division champions
- Division: 1st Northeast
- Conference: 1st Eastern
- 2005–06 record: 52–21–9
- Home record: 29–9–3
- Road record: 23–12–6
- Goals for: 314
- Goals against: 211

Team information
- General manager: John Muckler
- Coach: Bryan Murray
- Captain: Daniel Alfredsson
- Alternate captains: Zdeno Chara; Wade Redden
- Arena: Corel Centre (Note: Renamed to Scotiabank Place on January 19, 2006.)
- Average attendance: 19,474
- Minor league affiliates: Binghamton Senators; Charlotte Checkers

Team leaders
- Goals: Dany Heatley (50)
- Assists: Jason Spezza (71)
- Points: Daniel Alfredsson and Dany Heatley (103)
- Penalty minutes: Chris Neil (204)
- Plus/minus: Wade Redden (+35)
- Wins: Dominik Hasek (28)
- Goals against average: Dominik Hasek (2.09)

The 2005–06 Ottawa Senators season was the 14th season of the Ottawa Senators of the National Hockey League (NHL). After one of their franchise-best regular seasons, finishing with 113 points, the Senators made it to the Eastern Conference Semifinals, in which the Buffalo Sabres eliminated Ottawa in five games.

== Off-season ==
Changes occurred to the Senators roster before the season. First, Ottawa acquired the playoff-experienced goaltender Dominik Hasek for his Stanley Cup experience. Second, a blockbuster trade on August 23, 2005, involved Marian Hossa and Greg de Vries being sent to the Atlanta Thrashers for Dany Heatley. The trade occurred on the day that Hossa had signed a new contract. The value of Hossa's contract was beyond what General Manager John Muckler felt that Hossa was worth and so he was dealt away. Marian had led the Senators in scoring.

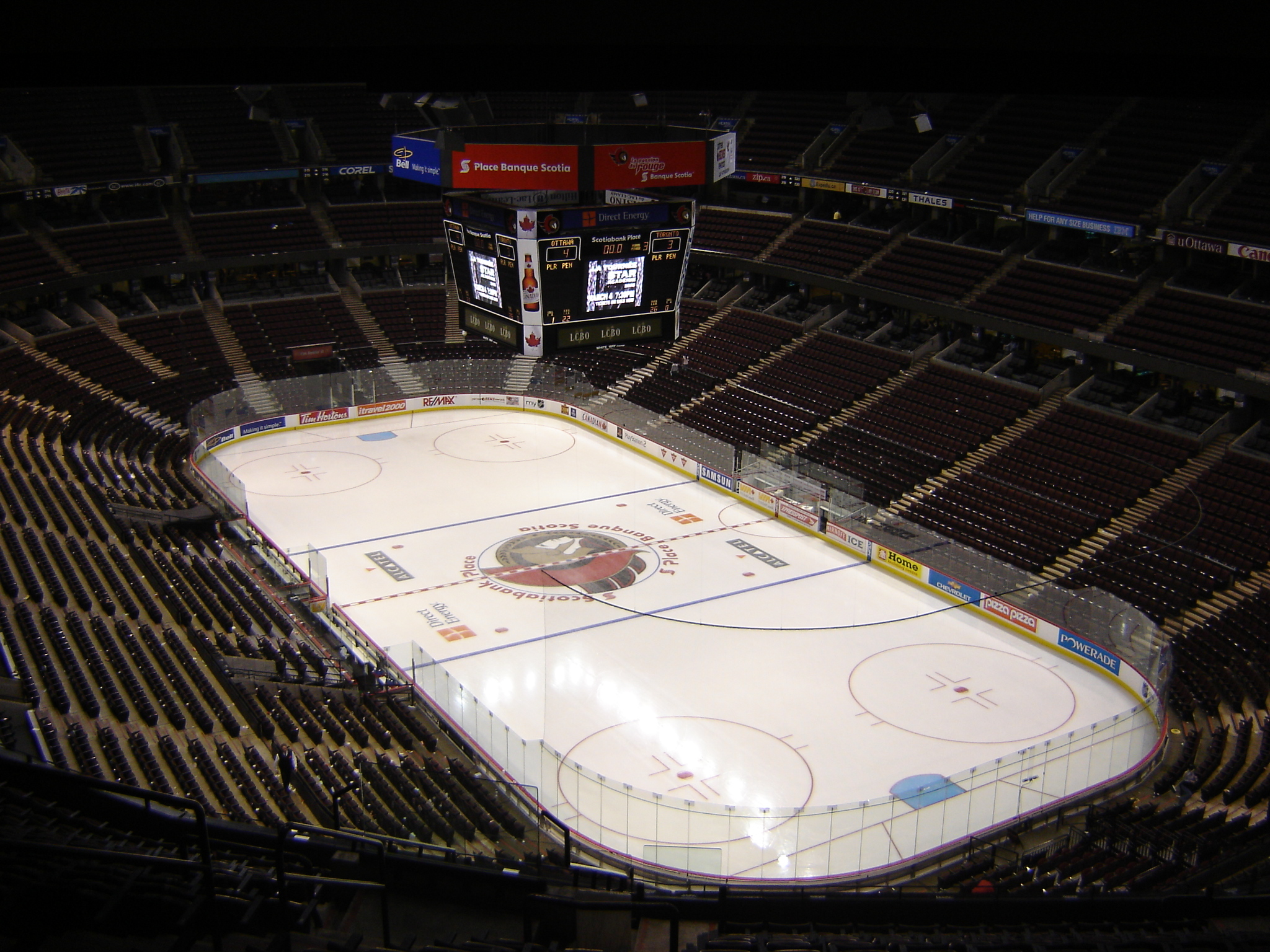
The Senators' arena, Scotiabank Place, its name since January 2006 since signing with Scotiabank for a 25-year, $25 million contract.

== Regular season ==
Dany Heatley, together with Daniel Alfredsson and Jason Spezza, formed one of the NHL's top offensive lines, dubbed the "CASH line" by fans in a contest held by the Ottawa Citizen. The name is made from the initials of Captain Alfredsson, Spezza, and Heatley. Cash Line won out over finalists 'Dash Line' and 'Dazzle Line,' which Spezza reputedly despised and wanted to veto. Another nickname the line picked up was the "Pizza Line", used by the Ottawa Sun, a rival to the Citizen. (Note: The name refers to a promotion instituted by a pizza company chain to provide a free slice of pizza to all attending when the Senators scored five goals in a game. The line increased the number of times the Senators scored five per game, and the pizza company had to change its promotion to six goals.) However, during the press conference to introduce the teams for the 2007 Stanley Cup Finals, Heatley went on record to say he likes the "CASH line" name.

The Senators team sent nine players to the 2006 Winter Olympics as part of the NHL's commitment. Daniel Alfredsson, Zdeno Chara, Martin Havlat, Dany Heatley, Andrej Meszaros, Wade Redden, Christoph Schubert and Anton Volchenkov all played for their respective country's national teams, while Jason Spezza was named a substitute for Canada. The experience, however, was poor for the Senators: Dominik Hasek was having an impressive season prior to Olympic play, but the team lost him to a hamstring injury he suffered while playing for the Czech Republic. He would not play again for the Senators.

In addition to leading the NHL with most goals for (312, excluding shootout-winning goals), the Senators also led the NHL in shorthanded goals (25), scoring points (840) and shots on goal (2,811).

=== Highlights ===
The "CASH line" made a dramatic and historic debut, playing in the first game of the 2005–06 season on October 5, 2005, against the Toronto Maple Leafs in Toronto. In the pre-season, right winger Brandon Bochenski had been playing on the line as he had played with Spezza in the American Hockey League (AHL) during the 2004–05 NHL lockout. But with five minutes to go, with the Senators trailing, then Senators' Head Coach Bryan Murray replaced Bochenski with Daniel Alfredsson, who scored a game-tying goal with 62 seconds left. Heatley and Alfredsson would then go on to score the first shootout goals in NHL history to win the game that night.

Other highlights of the Senators' season included an 8–0 road win over their Ontario rivals, the Maple Leafs, on October 29, 2005. Dany Heatley scored four consecutive goals in that game. Just four nights later, the Senators defeated the Buffalo Sabres in Buffalo, 10–4. Martin Havlat and Daniel Alfredsson each scored four goals and Jason Spezza provided four assists. It was the first time that an NHL team had scored ten goals in a regular-season game since January 11, 2003, when the Washington Capitals defeated the Florida Panthers at home by a score of 12–2. It was also the first time that the Senators had scored ten goals in a regular-season game since November 13, 2001, when they defeated the Capitals 11–5 away in Washington, D.C. On November 29, 2005, the Senators defeated the Montreal Canadiens 4–0 and, in doing so, improved to a 19–3–0 record through their first 22 games of the regular season. Over that span, Ottawa outscored its opponents 102–45. Spezza had reached 41 points (11 goals and 30 assists) and Alfredsson had reached 40 points (20 goals and 20 assists) by this point. Heatley recorded a point in every one of these games and had 17 goals and 21 assists for 38 points.

In an 8–2 win over Toronto on December 17, 2005, the Senators set a franchise record for most power play goals scored in one game, with six. On February 2, 2006, the Senators scored three short-handed goals in a 7–2 win over the Pittsburgh Penguins. It was the second time in franchise history that the Senators scored three shorthanded goals in a single game, as the Senators had scored three shorthanded goals in a 5–2 home win over the Florida Panthers on November 18, 2000.

Dany Heatley became the first Senator in franchise history to reach 100 points on April 13, 2006, recording two assists during a 5–4 overtime loss to the Florida Panthers and five days later became the first Senator to score 50 goals in a season. Meanwhile, defenceman Wade Redden became the first Senator to win the NHL Plus/Minus Award, tied with New York Ranger Michal Rozsival, with a +35 rating. Despite missing 14 games, Jason Spezza finished second in the NHL in assists, with 71.

=== Season standings ===
Northeast Division
No.	CR		GP	W	L	OTL	GF	GA	Pts
1	1	**Ottawa Senators**	82	52	21	9	314	211	113
2	4	**Buffalo Sabres**	82	52	24	6	281	239	110
3	7	**Montreal Canadiens**	82	42	31	9	243	247	93
4	9	Toronto Maple Leafs	82	41	33	8	257	270	90
5	13	Boston Bruins	82	29	37	16	230	266	74

Note: CR = Conference rank; GP = Games played; W = Wins; L = Losses; OTL = Overtime/Shootout loss; GF = Goals for; GA = Goals against; Pts = Points
Bolded teams qualified for the playoffs.

Eastern Conference
R		Div	GP	W	L	OTL	GF	GA	Pts
**1**	**Z-** Ottawa Senators	**NE**	**82**	**52**	**21**	**9**	**314**	**211**	113
**2**	**Y-** Carolina Hurricanes	**SE**	**82**	**52**	**22**	**8**	**294**	**260**	112
**3**	**Y-** New Jersey Devils	**AT**	**82**	**46**	**27**	**9**	**242**	**229**	101
**4**	**X-** Buffalo Sabres	**NE**	**82**	**52**	**24**	**6**	**242**	**239**	110
**5**	**X-** Philadelphia Flyers	**AT**	**82**	**45**	**26**	**11**	**267**	**259**	101
**6**	**X-** New York Rangers	**AT**	**82**	**44**	**26**	**12**	**257**	**215**	100
**7**	**X-** Montreal Canadiens	**NE**	**82**	**42**	**31**	**9**	**243**	**247**	93
**8**	**X-** Tampa Bay Lightning	**SE**	**82**	**43**	**33**	**6**	**252**	**260**	92
8.5
9	Toronto Maple Leafs	NE	82	41	33	8	257	270	90
10	Atlanta Thrashers	SE	82	41	33	8	281	275	90
11	Florida Panthers	SE	82	37	34	11	240	257	85
12	New York Islanders	AT	82	36	40	6	230	278	78
13	Boston Bruins	NE	82	29	37	16	230	266	74
14	Washington Capitals	SE	82	29	41	12	237	306	70
15	Pittsburgh Penguins	AT	82	22	46	14	244	316	58

Divisions: AT – Atlantic, NE – Northeast, SE – Southeast

Z – Clinched conference; Y – Clinched division; X – Clinched playoff spot

== Playoffs ==
The Ottawa Senators ended the 2005–06 regular season as the Eastern Conference's first seed, qualifying for the playoffs for the ninth time in the franchise's 13 seasons of play.

Ray Emery took over the starting goaltender duties; he became the first rookie netminder since Philadelphia's Brian Boucher in 2000 to win a playoff series when the Senators defeated the Tampa Bay Lightning in the first round of the Eastern Conference playoffs, four games to one. The Senators were then defeated by the Buffalo Sabres in the second round, four games to one.

After the playoff loss, Senators owner Eugene Melnyk comforted fans in an open letter by saying that their team would not only win the Stanley Cup in the future but, once they had it, they would, he boasted, "hoard" it year after year.

== Schedule and results ==
=== Regular season ===
2005–06 regular season
October: 8–2–0 (home: 4–1–0; road: 4–1–0)

Game	Date	Visitor	Score	Home	OT	Decision	Attendance	Record	Points	Recap
1	October 5	Ottawa	3–2	Toronto Maple Leafs	SO	Hasek	19,452	1–0–0	2	W
2	October 8	Buffalo Sabres	0–5	Ottawa		Hasek	19,661	2–0–0	4	W
3	October 10	Toronto Maple Leafs	5–6	Ottawa	SO	Hasek	18,680	3–0–0	6	W
4	October 11	Ottawa	4–2	Montreal Canadiens		Emery	21,273	4–0–0	8	W
5	October 15	Boston Bruins	1–5	Ottawa		Hasek	19,379	5–0–0	10	W
6	October 21	Ottawa	4–1	Tampa Bay Lightning		Hasek	20,494	6–0–0	12	W
7	October 24	Ottawa	2–3	Carolina Hurricanes		Hasek	12,116	6–1–0	12	L
8	October 27	Montreal Canadiens	3–4	Ottawa	OT	Emery	18,840	7–1–0	14	W
9	October 29	Ottawa	8–0	Toronto Maple Leafs		Hasek	19,480	8–1–0	16	W
10	October 30	Philadelphia Flyers	5–3	Ottawa		Hasek	19,335	8–2–0	16	L

November: 11–1–0 (home: 7–1–0; road: 4–0–0)

Game	Date	Visitor	Score	Home	OT	Decision	Attendance	Record	Points	Recap
11	November 2	Ottawa	10–4	Buffalo Sabres		Emery	13,905	9–2–0	18	W
12	November 3	Tampa Bay Lightning	4–2	Ottawa		Hasek	18,604	10–2–0	20	W
13	November 5	New York Islanders	0-6	Ottawa		Hasek	19,776	11–2–0	22	W
14	November 10	Ottawa	5–2	Boston Bruins		Hasek	17,159	12–2–0	24	W
15	November 12	Buffalo Sabres	1–6	Ottawa		Emery	19,414	13–2–0	26	W
16	November 15	Carolina Hurricanes	2–1	Ottawa		Hasek	19,544	13–3–0	26	L
17	November 17	Florida Panthers	1–4	Ottawa		Hasek	18,650	14–3–0	28	W
18	November 19	New Jersey Devils	4–5	Ottawa		Emery	19,534	15–3–0	30	W
19	November 22	Ottawa	5–3	Carolina Hurricanes		Hasek	13,427	16–3–0	32	W
20	November 25	Ottawa	6–2	New York Islanders		Hasek	15,564	17–3–0	35	W
21	November 26	Boston Bruins	2–4	Ottawa		Hasek	19,691	18–3–0	36	W
22	November 29	Montreal Canadiens	0–4	Ottawa		Emery	19,858	19–3–0	38	W

December: 8–3–3 (home: 5–1–0; road: 3–2–3)

Game	Date	Visitor	Score	Home	OT	Decision	Attendance	Record	Points	Recap
23	December 1	Ottawa	0–3	Boston Bruins		Hasek	15,639	19–4–0	38	L
24	December 2	Los Angeles Kings	1–5	Ottawa		Hasek	19,671	20–4–0	40	W
25	December 5	Ottawa	6–3	Florida Panthers		Hasek	10,883	21–4–0	42	W
26	December 9	Ottawa	2–3	Vancouver Canucks	SO	Hasek	18,630	21–4–1	44	OTL
27	December 10	Ottawa	1–2	Calgary Flames	OT	Emery	19,289	21–4–2	44	OTL
28	December 12	Ottawa	6–2	Colorado Avalanche		Hasek	18,007	22–4–2	46	W
29	December 15	Dallas Stars	2–0	Ottawa		Emery	19,598	22–5–2	46	L
30	December 17	Toronto Maple Leafs	2–8	Ottawa		Hasek	19,935	23–5–2	48	W
31	December 20	Ottawa	3–4	Montreal Canadiens	SO	Hasek	21,273	23–5–3	49	OTL
32	December 22	Ottawa	3–4	Philadelphia Flyers		Hasek	19,817	23–6–3	49	L
33	December 23	Ottawa	4–2	New York Islanders		Emery	11,425	24–6–3	51	W
34	December 26	New York Rangers	2–6	Ottawa		Hasek	19,806	25–6–3	53	W
35	December 28	Carolina Hurricanes	2–6	Ottawa		Hasek	20,050	26–6–3	55	W
36	December 30	New York Islanders	3–4	Ottawa		Emery	20,055	27–6–3	57	W

January: 7–5–1 (home: 4–2–1; road: 3–3–0)

Game	Date	Visitor	Score	Home	OT	Decision	Attendance	Record	Points	Recap
37	January 2	Ottawa	3–8	Atlanta Thrashers		Emery	12,536	27–7–3	57	L
38	January 4	Ottawa	3–1	Washington Capitals		Hasek	10,047	28–7–3	59	W
39	January 5	Ottawa	2–4	Boston Bruins		Hasek	15,481	28–8–3	59	L
40	January 7	Ottawa	1–4	Montreal Canadiens		Hasek	21,273	28–9–3	59	L
41	January 10	Phoenix Coyotes	2–7	Ottawa		Hasek	19,773	29–9–3	61	W
42	January 12	San Jose Sharks	2–0	Ottawa		Hasek	19,538	29–10–3	61	L
43	January 14	Ottawa	5–3	Edmonton Oilers		Hasek	16,839	30–10–3	63	W
44	January 16	Ottawa	6–1	Minnesota Wild		Hasek	18,568	31–10–3	65	W
45	January 19	Anaheim Ducks	4–3	Ottawa	SO	Hasek	19,387	31–10–4	66	OTL
46	January 21	Toronto Maple Leafs	0–7	Ottawa		Hasek	20,093	32–10–4	68	W
47	January 23	Toronto Maple Leafs	3–4	Ottawa		Hasek	19,865	33–10–4	70	W
48	January 26	Montreal Canadiens	0–3	Ottawa		Hasek	19,908	34–10–4	72	W
49	January 30	Boston Bruins	5–0	Ottawa		Emery	19,551	34–11–4	72	L

February: 3–3–1 (home: 2–1–0; road: 1–2–1)

Game	Date	Visitor	Score	Home	OT	Decision	Attendance	Record	Points	Recap
50	February 1	Ottawa	3–5	New Jersey Devils		Hasek	10,142	34–12–4	72	L
51	February 2	Ottawa	7–2	Pittsburgh Penguins		Hasek	14,714	35–12–4	74	W
52	February 4	Ottawa	1–2	Buffalo Sabres	SO	Hasek	17,451	35–12–5	75	OTL
53	February 6	Pittsburgh Penguins	2–5	Ottawa		Emery	19,877	36–12–5	77	W
54	February 8	Ottawa	1–5	New York Rangers		Hasek	18,200	36–13–5	77	L
55	February 9	Atlanta Thrashers	2–1	Ottawa		Hasek	19,604	36–14–5	77	L
56	February 11	Philadelphia Flyers	2–3	Ottawa		Hasek	19,834	37–14–5	79	W

March: 12–2–2 (home: 5–0–1; road: 7–2–1)

Game	Date	Visitor	Score	Home	OT	Decision	Attendance	Record	Points	Recap
57	March 1	Ottawa	4–3	Pittsburgh Penguins		Emery	14,026	38–14–5	81	W
58	March 2	Washington Capitals	1–7	Ottawa		Emery	19,346	39–14–5	83	W
59	March 4	Ottawa	4–2	Toronto Maple Leafs		Emery	19,486	40–14–5	85	W
60	March 6	Ottawa	4–0	Tampa Bay Lightning		Emery	19,855	41–14–5	87	W
61	March 8	Ottawa	2–6	Florida Panthers		Emery	15,196	41–15–5	87	L
62	March 10	Ottawa	3–1	Atlanta Thrashers		Emery	15,057	42–15–5	89	W
63	March 12	Ottawa	5–2	Washington Capitals		Emery	15,740	43–15–5	91	W
64	March 14	Tampa Bay Lightning	3–4	Ottawa		Emery	19,810	44–15–5	93	W
65	March 16	Ottawa	2–3	Boston Bruins	SO	Emery	15,066	44–15–6	94	OTL
66	March 18	Buffalo Sabres	2–4	Ottawa		Emery	19,947	45–15–6	96	W
67	March 19	Ottawa	4–0	New Jersey Devils		Emery	14,681	46–15–6	98	W
68	March 21	Pittsburgh Penguins	2–5	Ottawa		Emery	19,360	47–15–6	100	W
69	March 24	Ottawa	3–1	Buffalo Sabres		Emery	18,690	48–15–6	102	W
70	March 25	Ottawa	3–6	Philadelphia Flyers		Emery	19,869	48–16–6	103	L
71	March 28	New Jersey Devils	3–2	Ottawa	SO	Emery	18,668	48–16–7	103	OTL
72	March 30	New York Rangers	1–4	Ottawa		Emery	18,710	49–16–7	105	W

April: 3–5–2 (home: 2–3–1; road: 1–2–1)

Game	Date	Visitor	Score	Home	OT	Decision	Attendance	Record	Points	Recap
73	April 1	Washington Capitals	1–0	Ottawa		Emery	19,403	49–17–7	105	L
74	April 3	Atlanta Thrashers	4–6	Ottawa		Emery	18,742	50–17–7	107	W
75	April 5	Ottawa	4–5	Buffalo Sabres	OT	Emery	17,622	50–17–8	108	OTL
76	April 6	Montreal Canadiens	5–3	Ottawa		Emery	19,929	50–18–8	108	L
77	April 8	Buffalo Sabres	6–2	Ottawa		Emery	19,575	50–19–8	108	L
78	April 10	Ottawa	2–3	Montreal Canadiens		Emery	21,273	50–20–8	108	L
79	April 11	Boston Bruins	3–4	Ottawa	OT	Morrison	18,279	51–20–8	110	W
80	April 13	Florida Panthers	5–4	Ottawa	OT	Morrison	19,173	51–20–9	111	OTL
81	April 15	Ottawa	1–5	Toronto Maple Leafs		Emery	19,410	51–21–9	111	L
82	April 18	Ottawa	5–1	New York Rangers		Emery	18,200	52–21–9	113	W

Legend: W Win (2 points) L Loss (0 points) OTL Overtime/shootout loss (1 point)

=== Playoffs ===
2006 Stanley Cup playoffs
Eastern Conference Quarterfinals vs. (8) Tampa Bay Lightning – Senators win 4–1

Game	Date	Visitor	Score	Home	OT	Decision	Attendance	Series	Recap
1	April 21	Tampa Bay	1–4	Ottawa		Emery	19,660	Senators lead 1–0	W
2	April 23	Tampa Bay	4–3	Ottawa		Emery	19,745	Series tied 1–1	L
3	April 25	Ottawa	8–4	Tampa Bay		Emery	20,815	Senators lead 2–1	W
4	April 27	Ottawa	5–2	Tampa Bay		Emery	20,682	Senators lead 3–1	W
5	April 29	Tampa Bay	2–3	Ottawa		Emery	20,004	Senators win 4–1	W

Eastern Conference Semifinals vs. (4) Buffalo Sabres – Sabres win 4–1

Game	Date	Visitor	Score	Home	OT	Decision	Attendance	Series	Recap
1	May 5	Buffalo	7–6	Ottawa	OT	Emery	19,544	Sabres lead 1–0	L
2	May 8	Buffalo	2–1	Ottawa		Emery	19,816	Sabres lead 2–0	L
3	May 10	Ottawa	2–3	Buffalo	OT	Emery	18,690	Sabres lead 3–0	L
4	May 11	Ottawa	2–1	Buffalo		Emery	18,690	Sabres lead 3–1	W
5	May 13	Buffalo	3–2	Ottawa	OT	Emery	20,024	Sabres win 4–1	L

Legend: W Win L Loss

== Player statistics ==
=== Scoring ===
- Position abbreviations: C = Centre; D = Defence; G = Goaltender; LW = Left wing; RW = Right wing
- † = Joined team via a transaction (e.g., trade, waivers, signing) during the season. Stats reflect time with the Senators only.
- ‡ = Left team via a transaction (e.g., trade, waivers, release) during the season. Stats reflect time with the Senators only.

No.	Player	Pos	Regular season						Playoffs					
No.	Player	Pos	GP	G	A	Pts	+/-	PIM	GP	G	A	Pts	+/-	PIM
15	Dany Heatley	LW	82	50	53	103	29	86	10	3	9	12	1	11
11	Daniel Alfredsson	RW	77	43	60	103	29	50	10	2	8	10	2	4
19	Jason Spezza	C	68	19	71	90	23	33	10	5	9	14	−1	2
27	Peter Schaefer	LW	82	20	30	50	16	40	10	2	5	7	2	14
6	Wade Redden	D	65	10	40	50	35	63	9	2	8	10	−2	10
21	Bryan Smolinski	C	81	17	31	48	8	46	10	3	3	6	3	2
12	Mike Fisher	C	68	22	22	44	23	64	10	2	2	4	1	12
3	Zdeno Chara	D	71	16	27	43	17	135	10	1	3	4	0	23
14	Andrej Meszaros	D	82	10	29	39	34	61	10	1	0	1	0	18
2	Brian Pothier	D	77	5	30	35	29	59	8	2	1	3	1	2
20	Antoine Vermette	C	82	21	12	33	17	44	10	2	0	2	−1	4
25	Chris Neil	RW	79	16	17	33	9	204	10	1	0	1	−1	14
22	Chris Kelly	C	82	10	20	30	21	76	10	0	0	0	−4	2
44	Patrick Eaves	RW	58	20	9	29	7	22	10	1	0	1	−3	10
26	Vaclav Varada	RW	76	5	16	21	2	50	8	0	2	2	−2	12
4	Chris Phillips	D	69	1	18	19	19	90	9	2	0	2	−2	6
24	Anton Volchenkov	D	75	4	13	17	21	53	9	0	4	4	1	8
9	Martin Havlat	RW	18	9	7	16	6	4	10	7	6	13	0	4
10	Brandon Bochenski‡	RW	20	6	7	13	7	14	—	—	—	—	—	—
5	Christoph Schubert	D	56	4	6	10	4	48	7	0	1	1	3	4
16	Brian McGrattan	RW	60	2	3	5	0	141	—	—	—	—	—	—
10	Tyler Arnason†	C	19	0	4	4	−4	4	—	—	—	—	—	—
36	Steve Martins	C	4	1	1	2	2	0	—	—	—	—	—	—
45	Denis Hamel	LW	4	1	0	1	1	0	—	—	—	—	—	—
1	Ray Emery	G	39	0	1	1		2	10	0	1	1		0
30	Mike Morrison†	G	4	0	1	1		0	—	—	—	—	—	—
39	Dominik Hasek	G	43	0	0	0		16	—	—	—	—	—	—
42	Tomas Malec	D	2	0	0	0	4	2	—	—	—	—	—	—
33	Brad Norton†	D	7	0	0	0	1	31	—	—	—	—	—	—
17	Filip Novak	D	11	0	0	0	−2	4	—	—	—	—	—	—

=== Goaltending ===
- † = Joined team via a transaction (e.g., trade, waivers, signing) during the season. Stats reflect time with the Senators only.

No.	Player	Regular season										Playoffs								
No.	Player	GP	W	L	OT	SA	GA	GAA	SV%	SO	TOI	GP	W	L	SA	GA	GAA	SV%	SO	TOI
39	Dominik Hasek	43	28	10	4	1202	90	2.09	.925	5	2584	—	—	—	—	—	—	—	—	—
1	Ray Emery	39	23	11	4	1045	102	2.82	.902	3	2168	10	5	5	289	29	2.88	.900	0	604
30	Mike Morrison†	4	1	0	1	96	12	3.48	.875	0	207	—	—	—	—	—	—	—	—	—

== Awards and records ==
=== Awards ===
Type	Award/honour	Recipient	Ref
League (annual)	NHL All-Rookie Team	Andrej Meszaros (Defence)	
League (annual)	NHL Second All-Star Team	Daniel Alfredsson (Right wing)	
League (annual)	NHL Second All-Star Team	Zdeno Chara (Defence)	
League (annual)	NHL Second All-Star Team	Dany Heatley (Left wing)	
League (annual)	NHL Plus-Minus Award	Wade Redden (Note: Shared with Michal Rozsival of the New York Rangers)	
League (in-season)	NHL Defensive Player of the Month	Ray Emery (March)	
League (in-season)	NHL Offensive Player of the Month	Daniel Alfredsson (November)	
League (in-season)	NHL Offensive Player of the Week	Daniel Alfredsson (November 7)	
League (in-season)	NHL Offensive Player of the Week	Jason Spezza (November 28)	
League (in-season)	NHL Rookie of the Month	Ray Emery (March)	
Team	Molson Cup	Daniel Alfredsson	

=== Milestones ===
Milestone	Player	Date	Ref
First game	Brandon Bochenski	October 5, 2005	
First game	Brian McGrattan	October 5, 2005	
First game	Andrej Meszaros	October 5, 2005	
First game	Patrick Eaves	October 11, 2005	
First game	Christoph Schubert	October 29, 2005	
First game	Filip Novak	March 24, 2006	

== Transactions ==
The Senators were involved in the following transactions from February 17, 2005, the day after the 2004–05 NHL season was officially cancelled, through June 19, 2006, the day of the deciding game of the 2006 Stanley Cup Finals.

=== Trades ===
Date	Details		Ref
July 30, 2005	To Minnesota Wild: Todd White	To Ottawa Senators: 4th-round pick in 2005	
August 23, 2005	To Atlanta Thrashers: Greg de Vries; Marian Hossa	To Ottawa Senators: Dany Heatley	
October 5, 2005	To Florida Panthers: Conditional 6th-round pick in 2007	To Ottawa Senators: Filip Novak	
March 9, 2006	To Chicago Blackhawks: Brandon Bochenski; 2nd-round pick in 2006	To Ottawa Senators: Tyler Arnason	
May 26, 2006 (Note: Compensation due to Boston hiring Chiarelli as their general manager.)	To Boston Bruins: Peter Chiarelli	To Ottawa Senators: 3rd-round pick in 2006	

=== Players acquired ===
Date	Player	Former team	Term	Via	Ref
August 19, 2005	Brett Clouthier	New Jersey Devils	1-year	Free agency	
August 19, 2005	Tomas Malec	Anaheim Mighty Ducks	1-year	Free agency	
August 19, 2005	Steve Martins	JYP (Liiga)	1-year	Free agency	
August 26, 2005	Jeff Heerema	Vancouver Canucks	1-year	Free agency	
August 26, 2005	Lance Ward	Anaheim Mighty Ducks	1-year	Free agency	
September 17, 2005	Joe Cullen	Edmonton Oilers	1-year	Free agency	
September 30, 2005	Brennan Evans	Calgary Flames	1-year	Free agency	
March 8, 2006	Brad Norton	Binghamton Senators (AHL)	1-year	Free agency	
March 9, 2006	Mike Morrison	Edmonton Oilers		Waivers	

=== Players lost ===
Date	Player	New team	Via (Note: In parentheses is the player's free agency group on August 1 if applicable.)	Ref
July 22, 2005	Jesse Fibiger	Grizzlys Wolfsburg (ESBG)	Free agency (VI)	
August 4, 2005	Martin Prusek	Columbus Blue Jackets	Free agency (UFA)	
August 12, 2005	Andy Hedlund	Krefeld Pinguine (DEL)	Free agency (II) (Note: Ottawa retained Hedlund’s NHL rights and re-signed him on June 19, 2006.)	
August 22, 2005	Pat Kavanagh	Philadelphia Flyers	Free agency (VI)	
September 12, 2005	Josh Langfeld	San Jose Sharks	Free agency (UFA)	
May 12, 2006	Jan Platil	Lukko (Liiga)	Free agency	
June 5, 2006	Lance Ward	HV71 (SHL)	Free agency	

=== Signings ===
Date	Player	Term	Contract type	Ref
July 27, 2005	Dominik Hasek	1-year	Option exercised	
August 2, 2005	Denis Hamel	2-year	Re-signing	
August 10, 2005	Mike Fisher	3-year	Re-signing	
August 10, 2005	Martin Havlat	1-year	Re-signing	
August 11, 2005	Ray Emery	1-year	Re-signing	
August 12, 2005	Chris Neil	1-year	Re-signing	
August 12, 2005	Christoph Schubert	1-year	Re-signing	
August 12, 2005	Jason Spezza	1-year	Re-signing	
August 12, 2005	Antoine Vermette	1-year	Re-signing	
August 12, 2005	Anton Volchenkov	2-year	Re-signing	
August 16, 2005	Chris Kelly	1-year	Re-signing	
August 16, 2005	Brian McGrattan	1-year	Re-signing	
August 22, 2005	Patrick Eaves	3-year	Entry-level	
August 23, 2005	Dany Heatley	3-year	Re-signing	
August 23, 2005	Marian Hossa	3-year	Re-signing	
August 25, 2005	Andrej Meszaros	3-year	Entry-level	
September 16, 2005	Jeff Glass	3-year	Entry-level	
September 17, 2005	Charlie Stephens	1-year	Re-signing	
June 5, 2006	Cody Bass	multi-year	Entry-level	
June 5, 2006	Arttu Luttinen	multi-year	Entry-level	
June 19, 2006	Andy Hedlund	1-year	Re-signing	
June 19, 2006	Brian McGrattan	2-year	Re-signing	

== Draft picks ==
Ottawa's picks at the 2005 NHL entry draft in Ottawa, Ontario.

Round	#	Player	Nationality	NHL team	College/Junior/Club team (League)
1	9	Brian Lee (D)	United States	Ottawa Senators	Moorhead High School (USHS-MN)
3	70	Vitali Anikienko (D)	Russia	Ottawa Senators	Lokomotiv Yaroslavl (RSL)
4	95	Cody Bass (C)	Canada	Ottawa Senators (from Colorado Avalanche)	Mississauga IceDogs (OHL)
4	98	Ilya Zubov (C)	Russia	Ottawa Senators (from St. Louis)	Chelyabinsk (Russia)
4	115	Janne Kolehmainen (LW)	Finland	Ottawa Senators	SaiPa (SM-liiga)
5	136	Tomas Kudelka (D)	Czech Republic	Ottawa Senators	HC Zlín Jr. (Czech Jr.)
6	186	Dmitri Megalinsky	Russia	Ottawa Senators	Lokomotiv Yaroslavl (RSL)
7	204	Colin Greening	Canada	Ottawa Senators	Upper Canada College (CCL)

== Farm teams ==
=== Binghamton Senators ===
Dave Cameron returned to the Binghamton Senators as head coach of the club for the 2005–06 season.

The Senators struggled to a 35–37–4–4 record, earning 78 points and failing to qualify for the post-season as the club finished in fifth place in the East Division.

Denis Hamel co-led the AHL with 56 goals, as he was awarded the Willie Marshall Award. Hamel had a team high 91 points. In goal, Kelly Guard led Binghamton with 25 victories as well as having a team best 3.08 GAA and a .908 save percentage.

=== Charlotte Checkers ===
The Senators continued their affiliation with the Charlotte Checkers for the 2005–06 season. The affiliation was shared with the New York Rangers. Derek Wilkinson remained the head coach of the club.

The Checkers finished the season in fifth place in the South Division with a 34–33–2–3 record, registering 73 points. In the post-season, Charlotte lost to the South Carolina Stingrays in the divisional quarter-finals.

Dusty Jamieson led the club with 30 goals and 61 points in 62 games. Jeff Glass had a team-best 19 victories with a 3.22 GAA and a .907 save percentage.

== See also ==
- 2005–06 NHL season
