= 2005–06 Florida Panthers season =

12th season in the National Hockey League held in 2005-06

2005–06 Florida Panthers
- Division: 4th Southeast
- Conference: 11th Eastern
- 2005–06 record: 37–34–11
- Home record: 25–11–5
- Road record: 12–23–6
- Goals for: 240
- Goals against: 257

Team information
- General manager: Mike Keenan
- Coach: Jacques Martin
- Captain: Olli Jokinen
- Alternate captains: Chris Gratton; Sean Hill; Joe Nieuwendyk; Gary Roberts
- Arena: Bank Atlantic Center
- Average attendance: 16,014
- Minor league affiliates: Rochester Americans; Florida Everblades

Team leaders
- Goals: Olli Jokinen (38)
- Assists: Olli Jokinen (51)
- Points: Olli Jokinen (89)
- Penalty minutes: Chris Gratton (104)
- Plus/minus: Martin Gelinas (+27)
- Wins: Roberto Luongo (35)
- Goals against average: Roberto Luongo (2.97)

The 2005–06 Florida Panthers season was their 12th season in the National Hockey League (NHL). The Panthers failed to qualify for the playoffs for the fifth consecutive season for the first time in franchise history.

== Offseason ==
Just prior to the start of the regular season it was announced Olli Jokinen would remain team captain and Chris Gratton, Sean Hill, Joe Nieuwendyk, and Gary Roberts would rotate as alternate captains.

== Regular season ==
The Panthers were shut out a league-high 8 times and had the fewest power-play opportunities of all 30 teams, with 411.

=== Final standings ===
Southeast Division
No.	CR		GP	W	L	OTL	GF	GA	Pts
1	2	**Carolina Hurricanes**	82	52	22	8	294	260	112
2	8	**Tampa Bay Lightning**	82	43	33	6	252	260	92
3	10	Atlanta Thrashers	82	41	33	8	281	275	90
4	11	Florida Panthers	82	37	34	11	240	257	85
5	14	Washington Capitals	82	29	41	12	237	306	70

Note: CR = Conference rank; GP = Games played; W = Wins; L = Losses; T = Ties; OTL = Overtime loss; GF = Goals for; GA = Goals against; Pts = Points
Bolded teams qualified for the playoffs.

Eastern Conference
R		Div	GP	W	L	OTL	GF	GA	Pts
**1**	**Z-** Ottawa Senators	**NE**	**82**	**52**	**21**	**9**	**314**	**211**	113
**2**	**Y-** Carolina Hurricanes	**SE**	**82**	**52**	**22**	**8**	**294**	**260**	112
**3**	**Y-** New Jersey Devils	**AT**	**82**	**46**	**27**	**9**	**242**	**229**	101
**4**	**X-** Buffalo Sabres	**NE**	**82**	**52**	**24**	**6**	**242**	**239**	110
**5**	**X-** Philadelphia Flyers	**AT**	**82**	**45**	**26**	**11**	**267**	**259**	101
**6**	**X-** New York Rangers	**AT**	**82**	**44**	**26**	**12**	**257**	**215**	100
**7**	**X-** Montreal Canadiens	**NE**	**82**	**42**	**31**	**9**	**243**	**247**	93
**8**	**X-** Tampa Bay Lightning	**SE**	**82**	**43**	**33**	**6**	**252**	**260**	92
8.5
9	Toronto Maple Leafs	NE	82	41	33	8	257	270	90
10	Atlanta Thrashers	SE	82	41	33	8	281	275	90
11	Florida Panthers	SE	82	37	34	11	240	257	85
12	New York Islanders	AT	82	36	40	6	230	278	78
13	Boston Bruins	NE	82	29	37	16	230	266	74
14	Washington Capitals	SE	82	29	41	12	237	306	70
15	Pittsburgh Penguins	AT	82	22	46	14	244	316	58

Divisions: AT – Atlantic, NE – Northeast, SE – Southeast

Z – Clinched conference; Y – Clinched division; X – Clinched playoff spot

== Schedule and results ==
2005–06 regular season
October: 6–5–1 (home: 4–1–0; road: 2–4–1)

Game	Date	Score	Opponent	Record	Recap
1	October 5, 2005	2–0	Atlanta Thrashers (2005–06)	1–0–0	W
2	October 7, 2005	2–0	Tampa Bay Lightning (2005–06)	2–0–0	W
3	October 8, 2005	1–2	@ Tampa Bay Lightning (2005–06)	2–1–0	L
4	October 10, 2005	3–1	@ New York Islanders (2005–06)	3–1–0	W
5	October 13, 2005	2–5	Boston Bruins (2005–06)	3–2–0	L
6	October 15, 2005	3–2	Buffalo Sabres (2005–06)	4–2–0	W
7	October 17, 2005	0–4	@ New York Rangers (2005–06)	4–3–0	L
8	October 18, 2005	3–4	@ New Jersey Devils (2005–06)	4–4–0	L
9	October 20, 2005	3–2	Washington Capitals (2005–06)	5–4–0	W
10	October 25, 2005	4–3 OT	@ Pittsburgh Penguins (2005–06)	6–4–0	W
11	October 27, 2005	4–5 OT	@ Philadelphia Flyers (2005–06)	6–4–1	OTL
12	October 31, 2005	1–2	@ Toronto Maple Leafs (2005–06)	6–5–1	L

November: 1–9–3 (home: 1–4–1; road: 0–5–2)

Game	Date	Score	Opponent	Record	Recap
13	November 1, 2005	4–5 OT	@ Montreal Canadiens (2005–06)	6–5–2	OTL
14	November 3, 2005	1–4	@ Boston Bruins (2005–06)	6–6–2	L
15	November 5, 2005	0–2	@ Carolina Hurricanes (2005–06)	6–7–2	L
16	November 9, 2005	3–4 SO	New York Rangers (2005–06)	6–7–3	OTL
17	November 11, 2005	0–1	Carolina Hurricanes (2005–06)	6–8–3	L
18	November 12, 2005	4–5	@ Philadelphia Flyers (2005–06)	6–9–3	L
19	November 15, 2005	3–4 OT	@ Montreal Canadiens (2005–06)	6–9–4	OTL
20	November 17, 2005	1–4	@ Ottawa Senators (2005–06)	6–10–4	L
21	November 19, 2005	3–5	New York Islanders (2005–06)	6–11–4	L
22	November 23, 2005	1–5	New Jersey Devils (2005–06)	6–12–4	L
23	November 25, 2005	6–3	Pittsburgh Penguins (2005–06)	7–12–4	W
24	November 26, 2005	4–7	@ Atlanta Thrashers (2005–06)	7–13–4	L
25	November 28, 2005	1–2	Toronto Maple Leafs (2005–06)	7–14–4	L

December: 8–6–1 (home: 7–1–1; road: 1–5–0)

Game	Date	Score	Opponent	Record	Recap
26	December 1, 2005	3–2	Washington Capitals (2005–06)	8–14–4	W
27	December 3, 2005	4–3 OT	Chicago Blackhawks (2005–06)	9–14–4	W
28	December 5, 2005	3–6	Ottawa Senators (2005–06)	9–15–4	L
29	December 7, 2005	3–4	@ Dallas Stars (2005–06)	9–16–4	L
30	December 8, 2005	2–6	@ San Jose Sharks (2005–06)	9–17–4	L
31	December 10, 2005	1–3	@ Los Angeles Kings (2005–06)	9–18–4	L
32	December 13, 2005	7–3	Nashville Predators (2005–06)	10–18–4	W
33	December 15, 2005	3–2 OT	Detroit Red Wings (2005–06)	11–18–4	W
34	December 17, 2005	1–2	@ Atlanta Thrashers (2005–06)	11–19–4	L
35	December 18, 2005	3–2	@ Washington Capitals (2005–06)	12–19–4	W
36	December 22, 2005	4–1	Buffalo Sabres (2005–06)	13–19–4	W
37	December 23, 2005	3–4	@ Carolina Hurricanes (2005–06)	13–20–4	L
38	December 26, 2005	2–3 SO	Philadelphia Flyers (2005–06)	13–20–5	OTL
39	December 28, 2005	6–4	Boston Bruins (2005–06)	14–20–5	W
40	December 30, 2005	2–1	Montreal Canadiens (2005–06)	15–20–5	W

January: 5–5–3 (home: 2–1–2; road: 3–4–1)

Game	Date	Score	Opponent	Record	Recap
41	January 1, 2006	2–1	@ Buffalo Sabres (2005–06)	16–20–5	W
42	January 3, 2006	0–3	@ New Jersey Devils (2005–06)	16–21–5	L
43	January 4, 2006	3–4 OT	@ New York Islanders (2005–06)	16–21–6	OTL
44	January 7, 2006	0–4	@ New York Rangers (2005–06)	16–22–6	L
45	January 8, 2006	4–3 SO	@ Washington Capitals (2005–06)	17–22–6	W
46	January 12, 2006	3–1	St. Louis Blues (2005–06)	18–22–6	W
47	January 14, 2006	4–5 OT	Columbus Blue Jackets (2005–06)	18–22–7	OTL
48	January 19, 2006	3–6	@ Phoenix Coyotes (2005–06)	18–23–7	L
49	January 21, 2006	0–1	@ Mighty Ducks of Anaheim (2005–06)	18–24–7	L
50	January 24, 2006	3–2 OT	@ Tampa Bay Lightning (2005–06)	19–24–7	W
51	January 25, 2006	3–4 SO	Carolina Hurricanes (2005–06)	19–24–8	OTL
52	January 27, 2006	4–0	New Jersey Devils (2005–06)	20–24–8	W
53	January 30, 2006	2–4	Toronto Maple Leafs (2005–06)	20–25–8	L

February: 3–2–0 (home: 1–0–0; road: 2–2–0)

Game	Date	Score	Opponent	Record	Recap
54	February 3, 2006	5–2	Atlanta Thrashers (2005–06)	21–25–8	W
55	February 4, 2006	4–6	@ Atlanta Thrashers (2005–06)	21–26–8	L
56	February 7, 2006	5–0	@ Washington Capitals (2005–06)	22–26–8	W
57	February 11, 2006	3–5	@ Buffalo Sabres (2005–06)	22–27–8	L
58	February 28, 2006	8–2	@ Tampa Bay Lightning (2005–06)	23–27–8	W

March: 10–4–1 (home: 7–2–0; road: 3–2–1)

Game	Date	Score	Opponent	Record	Recap
59	March 2, 2006	0–1	Montreal Canadiens (2005–06)	23–28–8	L
60	March 3, 2006	2–5	@ Carolina Hurricanes (2005–06)	23–29–8	L
61	March 6, 2006	3–4 SO	@ Atlanta Thrashers (2005–06)	23–29–9	OTL
62	March 8, 2006	6–2	Ottawa Senators (2005–06)	24–29–9	W
63	March 10, 2006	5–3	Carolina Hurricanes (2005–06)	25–29–9	W
64	March 11, 2006	4–3 OT	Carolina Hurricanes (2005–06)	26–29–9	W
65	March 15, 2006	0–4	Philadelphia Flyers (2005–06)	26–30–9	L
66	March 17, 2006	4–2	New York Islanders (2005–06)	27–30–9	W
67	March 18, 2006	4–3 SO	@ Washington Capitals (2005–06)	28–30–9	W
68	March 20, 2006	6–5 OT	Tampa Bay Lightning (2005–06)	29–30–9	W
69	March 22, 2006	3–2	Washington Capitals (2005–06)	30–30–9	W
70	March 24, 2006	3–2 SO	New York Rangers (2005–06)	31–30–9	W
71	March 27, 2006	4–3 SO	@ Boston Bruins (2005–06)	32–30–9	W
72	March 29, 2006	5–3	@ Pittsburgh Penguins (2005–06)	33–30–9	W
73	March 31, 2006	2–3	@ Carolina Hurricanes (2005–06)	33–31–9	L

April: 4–3–2 (home: 3–2–1; road: 1–1–1)

Game	Date	Score	Opponent	Record	Recap
74	April 1, 2006	4–2	Tampa Bay Lightning (2005–06)	34–31–9	W
75	April 3, 2006	1–4	@ Tampa Bay Lightning (2005–06)	34–32–9	L
76	April 5, 2006	2–5	Atlanta Thrashers (2005–06)	34–33–9	L
77	April 7, 2006	1–5	Pittsburgh Penguins (2005–06)	34–34–9	L
78	April 9, 2006	6–3	Tampa Bay Lightning (2005–06)	35–34–9	W
79	April 11, 2006	5–6 OT	@ Toronto Maple Leafs (2005–06)	35–34–10	OTL
80	April 13, 2006	5–4 OT	@ Ottawa Senators (2005–06)	36–34–10	W
81	April 15, 2006	1–2 SO	Washington Capitals (2005–06)	36–34–11	OTL
82	April 18, 2006	2–1 OT	Atlanta Thrashers (2005–06)	37–34–11	W

Legend: W Win (2 points) L Loss (0 points) OTL Overtime/shootout loss (1 point)

== Player statistics ==
=== Scoring ===
- Position abbreviations: C = Center; D = Defense; G = Goaltender; LW = Left wing; RW = Right wing
- † = Joined team via a transaction (e.g., trade, waivers, signing) during the season. Stats reflect time with the Panthers only.
- ‡ = Left team via a transaction (e.g., trade, waivers, release) during the season. Stats reflect time with the Panthers only.

No.	Player	Pos	Regular season					
No.	Player	Pos	GP	G	A	Pts	+/-	PIM
12	Olli Jokinen	C	82	38	51	89	14	88
25	Joe Nieuwendyk	C	65	26	30	56	−2	46
15	Jozef Stumpel	C	74	15	37	52	11	26
16	Nathan Horton	C	71	28	19	47	8	89
4	Jay Bouwmeester	D	82	5	41	46	1	79
23	Martin Gelinas	LW	82	17	24	41	27	80
10	Gary Roberts	LW	58	14	26	40	4	51
77	Chris Gratton	C	76	17	22	39	6	104
26	Mike Van Ryn	D	80	8	29	37	15	90
13	Juraj Kolnik	RW	77	15	20	35	1	40
9	Stephen Weiss	C	41	9	12	21	−2	22
85	Rostislav Olesz	C	59	8	13	21	−4	24
22 (Note: Hill wore number 55 through January 25.)	Sean Hill	D	78	2	18	20	3	80
11	Jon Sim†	LW	33	10	8	18	−1	26
2	Lukas Krajicek	D	67	2	14	16	1	50
20	Joel Kwiatkowski	D	73	4	8	12	3	86
44	Gregory Campbell	LW	64	3	6	9	−11	40
22	Kristian Huselius‡	LW	24	5	3	8	−11	4
14	Niklas Hagman‡	LW	30	2	4	6	−8	2
43	Serge Payer	C	71	2	4	6	−7	26
7	Steve Montador†	D	51	1	5	6	4	68
57	Anthony Stewart	C	10	2	1	3	2	2
1	Roberto Luongo	G	75	0	3	3		2
55	Ric Jackman†	D	15	1	1	2	0	6
21	Alexei Semenov†	D	16	1	1	2	−1	21
51	Rob Globke	C	18	1	0	1	0	6
33	Eric Cairns‡	D	23	0	1	1	1	37
40	Greg Jacina	LW	11	0	1	1	−1	4
5	Branislav Mezei	D	16	0	1	1	3	37
42	Mikhail Yakubov†	C	13	0	1	1	−1	4
33	Jamie Allison†	D	7	0	0	0	0	11
7	Alexander Karpovtsev‡	D	6	0	0	0	−3	4
29	Jamie McLennan	G	17	0	0	0		0
37	Petr Taticek‡	C	3	0	0	0	0	0

=== Goaltending ===
No.	Player	Regular season									
No.	Player	GP	W	L	OT	SA	GA	GAA	SV%	SO	TOI
1	Roberto Luongo	75	35	30	9	2488	213	2.97	.914	4	4305
29	Jamie McLennan	17	2	4	2	360	34	3.01	.906	0	678

== Awards and records ==
=== Awards ===
Type	Award/honor	Recipient	Ref
League (in-season)	NHL Defensive Player of the Week	Roberto Luongo (October 10)	
League (in-season)	NHL Defensive Player of the Week	Roberto Luongo (December 19)	
League (in-season)	NHL Offensive Player of the Week	Olli Jokinen (March 13)	

=== Milestones ===
Milestone	Player	Date	Ref
First game	Rostislav Olesz	October 5, 2005	
First game	Anthony Stewart	October 18, 2005	
First game	Greg Jacina	November 12, 2005	
First game	Rob Globke	December 28, 2005	
First game	Petr Taticek	January 21, 2006	
25th shutout	Roberto Luongo	October 7, 2005	
400th goal	Gary Roberts	November 19, 2005	

== Transactions ==
The Panthers were involved in the following transactions from June 11, 2005, the day after the deciding game of the 2005 Calder Cup Finals, through June 19, 2006, the day of the deciding game of the 2006 Stanley Cup Finals.

=== Trades ===
Date	Details		Ref
July 27, 2005	To Nashville Predators: Darcy Hordichuk	To Florida Panthers: 4th-round pick in 2005	
July 30, 2005	To Philadelphia Flyers: 1st-round pick in 2005; 2nd-round pick in 2006	To Florida Panthers: 1st-round pick in 2005	
October 5, 2005	To Ottawa Senators: Filip Novak	To Florida Panthers: Conditional 6th-round pick in 2007	
November 19, 2005	To Edmonton Oilers: Conditional draft pick in 2006	To Florida Panthers: Alexei Semenov	
December 2, 2005	To Calgary Flames: Kristian Huselius	To Florida Panthers: Dustin Johner; Steve Montador	
December 12, 2005	To Dallas Stars: Niklas Hagman	To Florida Panthers: 7th-round pick in 2007	
January 18, 2006	To Pittsburgh Penguins: Eric Cairns	To Florida Panthers: 6th-round pick in 2006	
January 23, 2006	To Philadelphia Flyers: 6th-round pick in 2007	To Florida Panthers: Jon Sim	
March 9, 2006	To Pittsburgh Penguins: Petr Taticek	To Florida Panthers: Ric Jackman	

=== Players acquired ===
Date	Player	Former team	Term	Via	Ref
August 1, 2005	Joe Nieuwendyk	Toronto Maple Leafs	2-year	Free agency	
August 1, 2005	Gary Roberts	Toronto Maple Leafs	2-year	Free agency	
August 2, 2005	Martin Gelinas	Calgary Flames	2-year	Free agency	
August 12, 2005	Chris Gratton	Colorado Avalanche	1-year	Free agency	
August 17, 2005	Jozef Stumpel	HC Slavia Praha (ELH)	2-year	Free agency	
August 19, 2005	Jean-Marc Pelletier	Phoenix Coyotes		Free agency	
August 26, 2005	Dan Focht	Hamilton Bulldogs (AHL)		Free agency	
August 31, 2005	Phil Osaer	San Antonio Rampage (AHL)		Free agency	
September 25, 2005	Drew Larman	London Knights (OHL)		Free agency	
January 28, 2006	Mikhail Yakubov	Chicago Blackhawks		Waivers	
February 13, 2006	Jamie Allison	Nashville Predators		Waivers	
June 15, 2006	Ville Peltonen	HC Lugano (NLA)		Free agency	

=== Players lost ===
Date	Player	New team	Via (Note: In parentheses is the player's free agency group on August 1 if applicable.)	Ref
N/A	Kamil Piros	HC Neftekhimik Nizhnekamsk (RSL)	Free agency (VI)	
July 1, 2005	Travis Scott	Metallurg Magnitogorsk (RSL)	Free agency (VI)	
July 28, 2005	Mathieu Biron	Washington Capitals (Note: Biron signed with Washington on August 10.)	Compliance buyout	
August 1, 2005	Ty Jones (Note: Jones retired.)		Contract expiration (VI)	
August 13, 2005	Patrick DesRochers	Adler Mannheim (DEL)	Free agency (VI)	
August 16, 2005	Paul Healey	Colorado Avalanche	Free agency (UFA)	
August 26, 2005	Christian Berglund	Rapperswil-Jona Lakers (NLA)	Free agency (II) (Note: Florida retained Berglund’s NHL rights through the 2007–08 season.)	
September 8, 2005	Josh Olson	Houston Aeros (AHL)	Free agency (UFA)	
September 10, 2005	Burke Henry	EC Red Bull Salzburg (EBEL)	Free agency (VI)	
September 21, 2005	Scott Kelman	Gwinnett Gladiators (ECHL)	Free agency (UFA)	
October 2, 2005	Ryan Jardine	Hamburg Freezers (DEL)	Free agency (VI)	
October 3, 2005	Eric Beaudoin	Jokerit (Liiga)	Free agency (UFA)	
June 17, 2006	Mikhail Yakubov	Severstal Cherepovets (RSL)	Free agency (Note: Florida retained Yakubov’s NHL rights through the 2008–09 season.)	

=== Signings ===
Date	Player	Term	Contract type	Ref
July 28, 2005	Martin Lojek		Entry-level	
July 28, 2005	Stefan Meyer		Entry-level	
August 2, 2005	Greg Jacina	2-year	Re-signing	
August 2, 2005	Joel Kwiatkowski	2-year	Re-signing	
August 12, 2005	Niklas Hagman	1-year	Re-signing	
August 12, 2005	Kristian Huselius	1-year	Re-signing	
August 12, 2005	Stephen Weiss	1-year	Re-signing	
August 15, 2005	Juraj Kolnik	1-year	Re-signing	
August 15, 2005	Filip Novak	1-year	Re-signing	
August 15, 2005	Martin Tuma	3-year	Entry-level	
August 18, 2005	Rostislav Olesz	3-year	Entry-level	
August 22, 2005	Serge Payer		Re-signing	
August 25, 2005	Roberto Luongo	1-year	Arbitration award	
September 12, 2005	Jay Bouwmeester	1-year	Re-signing	
September 12, 2005	Olli Jokinen	1-year	Re-signing	
September 12, 2005	Mike Van Ryn	1-year	Re-signing	
March 9, 2006	Chris Gratton	2-year	Extension	
March 9, 2006	Olli Jokinen	4-year	Extension	
May 29, 2006	Janis Sprukts	1-year	Entry-level	
May 31, 2006	Bret Nasby		Entry-level	
May 31, 2006	David Shantz		Entry-level	
June 15, 2006	Sean Hill	1-year	Option exercised	

== Draft picks ==
Florida's draft picks at the 2005 NHL entry draft held at the Westin Hotel in Ottawa, Ontario.

Round	#	Player	Nationality	College/Junior/Club team (League)
1	20	Kenndal McArdle	Canada	Moose Jaw Warriors (WHL)
2	32	Tyler Plante	Canada	Brandon Wheat Kings (WHL)
3	90	Dan Collins	United States	Plymouth Whalers (OHL)
4	93	Olivier Legault	Canada	Lewiston Maineiacs (QMJHL)
4	104	Matt Duffy	United States	New Hampshire Junior Monarchs (EJHL)
5	161	Brian Foster	United States	New Hampshire Junior Monarchs (EJHL)
6	164	Roman Derlyuk	Russia	Spartak St. Petersburg (Russia)
7	224	Zach Bearson	United States	Waterloo Black Hawks (USHL)
