= 2005–06 Atlanta Thrashers season =

National Hockey League team season

2005–06 Atlanta Thrashers
- Division: 3rd Southeast
- Conference: 10th Eastern
- 2005–06 record: 41–33–8
- Home record: 24–13–4
- Road record: 17–20–4
- Goals for: 281
- Goals against: 275

Team information
- General manager: Don Waddell
- Coach: Bob Hartley
- Captain: Scott Mellanby
- Alternate captains: Peter Bondra; Bobby Holik; Vyacheslav Kozlov
- Arena: Philips Arena
- Average attendance: 15,550
- Minor league affiliates: Chicago Wolves; Gwinnett Gladiators

Team leaders
- Goals: Ilya Kovalchuk (52)
- Assists: Marc Savard (69)
- Points: Ilya Kovalchuk (98)
- Penalty minutes: Andy Sutton (144)
- Plus/minus: Marian Hossa (+17)
- Wins: Kari Lehtonen (20)
- Goals against average: Mike Dunham (2.77)

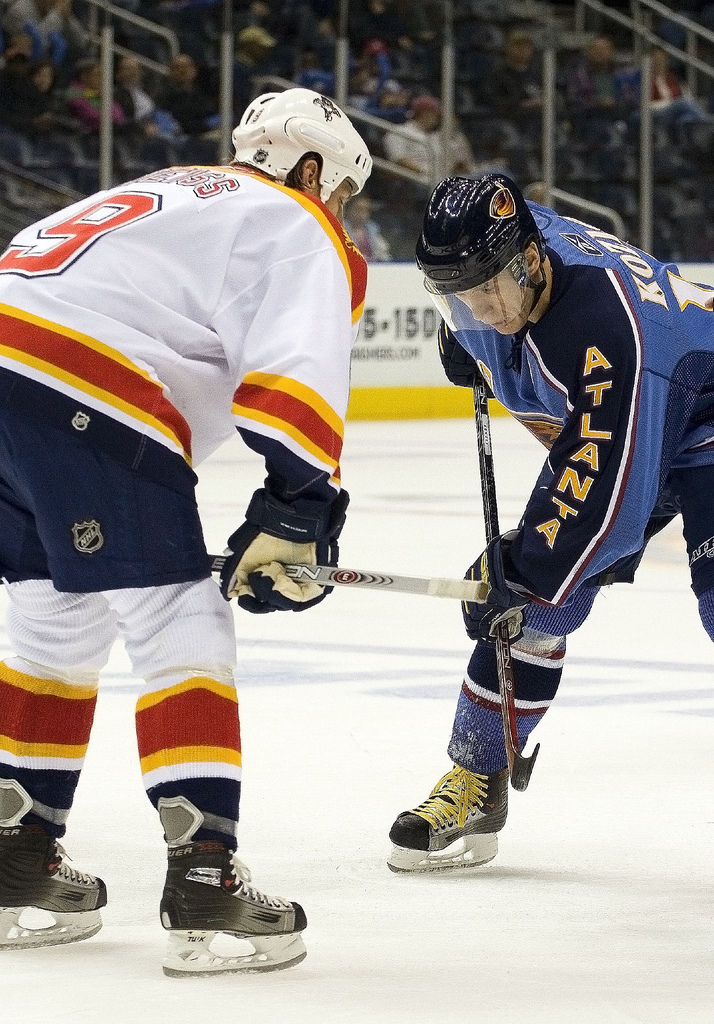

The 2005–06 Atlanta Thrashers season was the 23rd season of play for the National Hockey League franchise that was established on June 22, 1979, and 31st season for the organization overall.

== Regular season ==
The Thrashers again did not qualify for the playoffs.

== Offseason ==
On September 27, 2005, Scott Mellanby was named team captain. Peter Bondra, Bobby Holik, and Vyacheslav Kozlov were named alternate captains, rotating on a game-by-game basis.

== Regular season ==
=== Final standings ===
Southeast Division
No.	CR		GP	W	L	OTL	GF	GA	Pts
1	2	**Carolina Hurricanes**	82	52	22	8	294	260	112
2	8	**Tampa Bay Lightning**	82	43	33	6	252	260	92
3	10	Atlanta Thrashers	82	41	33	8	281	275	90
4	11	Florida Panthers	82	37	34	11	240	257	85
5	14	Washington Capitals	82	29	41	12	237	306	70

Note: CR = Conference rank; GP = Games played; W = Wins; L = Losses; T = Ties; OTL = Overtime loss; GF = Goals for; GA = Goals against; Pts = Points
Bolded teams qualified for the playoffs.

Eastern Conference
R		Div	GP	W	L	OTL	GF	GA	Pts
**1**	**Z-** Ottawa Senators	**NE**	**82**	**52**	**21**	**9**	**314**	**211**	113
**2**	**Y-** Carolina Hurricanes	**SE**	**82**	**52**	**22**	**8**	**294**	**260**	112
**3**	**Y-** New Jersey Devils	**AT**	**82**	**46**	**27**	**9**	**242**	**229**	101
**4**	**X-** Buffalo Sabres	**NE**	**82**	**52**	**24**	**6**	**242**	**239**	110
**5**	**X-** Philadelphia Flyers	**AT**	**82**	**45**	**26**	**11**	**267**	**259**	101
**6**	**X-** New York Rangers	**AT**	**82**	**44**	**26**	**12**	**257**	**215**	100
**7**	**X-** Montreal Canadiens	**NE**	**82**	**42**	**31**	**9**	**243**	**247**	93
**8**	**X-** Tampa Bay Lightning	**SE**	**82**	**43**	**33**	**6**	**252**	**260**	92
8.5
9	Toronto Maple Leafs	NE	82	41	33	8	257	270	90
10	Atlanta Thrashers	SE	82	41	33	8	281	275	90
11	Florida Panthers	SE	82	37	34	11	240	257	85
12	New York Islanders	AT	82	36	40	6	230	278	78
13	Boston Bruins	NE	82	29	37	16	230	266	74
14	Washington Capitals	SE	82	29	41	12	237	306	70
15	Pittsburgh Penguins	AT	82	22	46	14	244	316	58

Divisions: AT – Atlantic, NE – Northeast, SE – Southeast

Z – Clinched conference; Y – Clinched division; X – Clinched playoff spot

== Schedule and results ==
2005–06 regular season
October: 3–8–0 (home: 2–4–0; road: 1–4–0)

Game	Date	Score	Opponent	Record	Recap
1	October 5, 2005	0–2	@ Florida Panthers (2005–06)	0–1–0	L
2	October 7, 2005	7–3	@ Washington Capitals (2005–06)	1–1–0	W
3	October 8, 2005	8–1	Washington Capitals (2005–06)	2–1–0	W
4	October 12, 2005	0–2	Montreal Canadiens (2005–06)	2–2–0	L
5	October 14, 2005	1–9	Toronto Maple Leafs (2005–06)	2–3–0	L
6	October 15, 2005	1–5	@ New York Rangers (2005–06)	2–4–0	L
7	October 20, 2005	0–6	Tampa Bay Lightning (2005–06)	2–5–0	L
8	October 22, 2005	4–3	New Jersey Devils (2005–06)	3–5–0	W
9	October 25, 2005	3–4	@ New York Islanders (2005–06)	3–6–0	L
10	October 27, 2005	5–7	@ Pittsburgh Penguins (2005–06)	3–7–0	L
11	October 29, 2005	2–3	Tampa Bay Lightning (2005–06)	3–8–0	L

November: 7–4–3 (home: 3–2–1; road: 4–2–2)

Game	Date	Score	Opponent	Record	Recap
12	November 1, 2005	6–4	@ Tampa Bay Lightning (2005–06)	4–8–0	W
13	November 4, 2005	2–3 SO	@ Washington Capitals (2005–06)	4–8–1	OTL
14	November 5, 2005	3–4	@ Philadelphia Flyers (2005–06)	4–9–1	L
15	November 9, 2005	5–0	Pittsburgh Penguins (2005–06)	5–9–1	W
16	November 11, 2005	5–2	Tampa Bay Lightning (2005–06)	6–9–1	W
17	November 12, 2005	9–0	@ Carolina Hurricanes (2005–06)	7–9–1	W
18	November 16, 2005	3–7	New York Islanders (2005–06)	7–10–1	L
19	November 18, 2005	6–5 OT	@ Philadelphia Flyers (2005–06)	8–10–1	W
20	November 19, 2005	1–5	@ Toronto Maple Leafs (2005–06)	8–11–1	L
21	November 22, 2005	2–3 SO	@ Montreal Canadiens (2005–06)	8–11–2	OTL
22	November 24, 2005	3–6	New York Rangers (2005–06)	8–12–2	L
23	November 26, 2005	7–4	Florida Panthers (2005–06)	9–12–2	W
24	November 27, 2005	5–2	@ Carolina Hurricanes (2005–06)	10–12–2	W
25	November 29, 2005	3–4 OT	Carolina Hurricanes (2005–06)	10–12–3	OTL

December: 6–5–3 (home: 4–1–3; road: 2–4–0)

Game	Date	Score	Opponent	Record	Recap
26	December 1, 2005	0–4	Toronto Maple Leafs (2005–06)	10–13–3	L
27	December 3, 2005	1–2	@ Mighty Ducks of Anaheim (2005–06)	10–14–3	L
28	December 5, 2005	2–5	@ Phoenix Coyotes (2005–06)	10–15–3	L
29	December 6, 2005	3–5	@ San Jose Sharks (2005–06)	10–16–3	L
30	December 9, 2005	5–2	Columbus Blue Jackets (2005–06)	11–16–3	W
31	December 11, 2005	4–5 SO	Chicago Blackhawks (2005–06)	11–16–4	OTL
32	December 13, 2005	7–6	Detroit Red Wings (2005–06)	12–16–4	W
33	December 15, 2005	3–2 OT	@ New Jersey Devils (2005–06)	13–16–4	W
34	December 17, 2005	2–1	Florida Panthers (2005–06)	14–16–4	W
35	December 22, 2005	5–6 SO	Washington Capitals (2005–06)	14–16–5	OTL
36	December 23, 2005	1–0	@ New Jersey Devils (2005–06)	15–16–5	W
37	December 26, 2005	4–0	Montreal Canadiens (2005–06)	16–16–5	W
38	December 28, 2005	3–4 OT	Philadelphia Flyers (2005–06)	16–16–6	OTL
39	December 30, 2005	1–4	@ Buffalo Sabres (2005–06)	16–17–6	L

January: 7–7–0 (home: 4–4–0; road: 3–3–0)

Game	Date	Score	Opponent	Record	Recap
40	January 1, 2006	5–2	@ Washington Capitals (2005–06)	17–17–6	W
41	January 2, 2006	8–3	Ottawa Senators (2005–06)	18–17–6	W
42	January 4, 2006	3–4	@ Carolina Hurricanes (2005–06)	18–18–6	L
43	January 6, 2006	6–4	Pittsburgh Penguins (2005–06)	19–18–6	W
44	January 7, 2006	4–3	@ Pittsburgh Penguins (2005–06)	20–18–6	W
45	January 11, 2006	4–3 SO	Nashville Predators (2005–06)	21–18–6	W
46	January 13, 2006	2–0	St. Louis Blues (2005–06)	22–18–6	W
47	January 18, 2006	5–2	@ Dallas Stars (2005–06)	23–18–6	W
48	January 19, 2006	6–8	@ Los Angeles Kings (2005–06)	23–19–6	L
49	January 21, 2006	0–2	Tampa Bay Lightning (2005–06)	23–20–6	L
50	January 24, 2006	2–3	Boston Bruins (2005–06)	23–21–6	L
51	January 26, 2006	1–5	Carolina Hurricanes (2005–06)	23–22–6	L
52	January 28, 2006	1–4	@ Carolina Hurricanes (2005–06)	23–23–6	L
53	January 31, 2006	2–5	Buffalo Sabres (2005–06)	23–24–6	L

February: 3–2–0 (home: 1–0–0; road: 2–2–0)

Game	Date	Score	Opponent	Record	Recap
54	February 3, 2006	2–5	@ Florida Panthers (2005–06)	23–25–6	L
55	February 4, 2006	6–4	Florida Panthers (2005–06)	24–25–6	W
56	February 7, 2006	1–4	@ Toronto Maple Leafs (2005–06)	24–26–6	L
57	February 9, 2006	2–1	@ Ottawa Senators (2005–06)	25–26–6	W
58	February 11, 2006	2–1 SO	@ Montreal Canadiens (2005–06)	26–26–6	W

March: 9–5–0 (home: 6–2–0; road: 3–3–0)

Game	Date	Score	Opponent	Record	Recap
59	March 1, 2006	4–2	@ Buffalo Sabres (2005–06)	27–26–6	W
60	March 2, 2006	2–3	@ Boston Bruins (2005–06)	27–27–6	L
61	March 4, 2006	3–2 OT	Washington Capitals (2005–06)	28–27–6	W
62	March 6, 2006	4–3 SO	Florida Panthers (2005–06)	29–27–6	W
63	March 8, 2006	3–2 SO	New York Rangers (2005–06)	30–27–6	W
64	March 10, 2006	1–3	Ottawa Senators (2005–06)	30–28–6	L
65	March 12, 2006	3–2 OT	@ New York Rangers (2005–06)	31–28–6	W
66	March 16, 2006	4–2	New York Islanders (2005–06)	32–28–6	W
67	March 18, 2006	2–4	Philadelphia Flyers (2005–06)	32–29–6	L
68	March 20, 2006	5–0	Buffalo Sabres (2005–06)	33–29–6	W
69	March 21, 2006	5–4 SO	@ Boston Bruins (2005–06)	34–29–6	W
70	March 23, 2006	6–5 OT	New Jersey Devils (2005–06)	35–29–6	W
71	March 25, 2006	1–5	@ New York Islanders (2005–06)	35–30–6	L
72	March 30, 2006	3–4	@ Tampa Bay Lightning (2005–06)	35–31–6	L

April: 6–2–2 (home: 4–0–0; road: 2–2–2)

Game	Date	Score	Opponent	Record	Recap
73	April 1, 2006	5–2	Carolina Hurricanes (2005–06)	36–31–6	W
74	April 3, 2006	4–6	@ Ottawa Senators (2005–06)	36–32–6	L
75	April 5, 2006	5–2	@ Florida Panthers (2005–06)	37–32–6	W
76	April 6, 2006	2–3 SO	@ Tampa Bay Lightning (2005–06)	37–32–7	OTL
77	April 8, 2006	5–2	Carolina Hurricanes (2005–06)	38–32–7	W
78	April 11, 2006	6–2	@ Tampa Bay Lightning (2005–06)	39–32–7	W
79	April 13, 2006	5–3	Washington Capitals (2005–06)	40–32–7	W
80	April 15, 2006	4–3	Boston Bruins (2005–06)	41–32–7	W
81	April 17, 2006	4–6	@ Washington Capitals (2005–06)	41–33–7	L
82	April 18, 2006	1–2 OT	@ Florida Panthers (2005–06)	41–33–8	OTL

Legend: W Win (2 points) L Loss (0 points) OTL Overtime/shootout loss (1 point)

== Player statistics ==
=== Scoring ===
- Position abbreviations: C = Center; D = Defense; G = Goaltender; LW = Left wing; RW = Right wing
- † = Joined team via a transaction (e.g., trade, waivers, signing) during the season. Stats reflect time with the Thrashers only.
- ‡ = Left team via a transaction (e.g., trade, waivers, release) during the season. Stats reflect time with the Thrashers only.

No.	Player	Pos	Regular season					
No.	Player	Pos	GP	G	A	Pts	+/-	PIM
17	Ilya Kovalchuk	LW	78	52	46	98	−6	68
9	Marc Savard	C	82	28	69	97	7	100
18	Marian Hossa	RW	80	39	53	92	17	67
13	Vyacheslav Kozlov	LW	82	25	46	71	14	33
12	Peter Bondra	RW	60	21	18	39	−3	40
44	Jaroslav Modry	D	79	7	31	38	−9	76
7	Greg de Vries	D	82	7	28	35	1	76
19	Scott Mellanby	RW	71	12	22	34	5	55
16	Bobby Holik	C	64	15	18	33	−6	79
28	Niclas Havelid	D	82	4	28	32	9	48
25	Andy Sutton	D	76	8	17	25	13	144
27	Patrik Stefan	C	64	10	14	24	3	36
10	Serge Aubin	LW	74	7	17	24	−4	79
23	Jim Slater	C	71	10	10	20	1	46
26	Ronald Petrovicky	RW	60	8	12	20	−8	62
29	Brad Larsen	LW	62	7	8	15	−3	21
5	Steve McCarthy†	D	16	7	3	10	0	8
11	J. P. Vigier	RW	41	4	6	10	−4	40
2	Garnet Exelby	D	75	1	9	10	11	75
36	Eric Boulton	LW	51	4	5	9	−4	87
34	Shane Hnidy	D	66	0	3	3	1	33
24	Ramzi Abid	LW	6	0	2	2	1	6
35	Michael Garnett	G	24	0	2	2		0
4	Braydon Coburn	D	9	0	1	1	−2	4
14	Rico Fata†‡	RW	6	0	1	1	−2	4
32	Kari Lehtonen	G	38	0	1	1		4
21	Derek MacKenzie	C	11	0	1	1	0	8
47	Scott Barney	C	3	0	0	0	−1	0
33	Adam Berkhoel	G	9	0	0	0		0
1	Mike Dunham	G	17	0	0	0		0
5	Tomas Kloucek	D	1	0	0	0	0	2
24	Chris Kunitz‡	LW	2	0	0	0	−3	2
22	Francis Lessard	RW	6	0	0	0	−2	0
39	Mark Popovic	D	7	0	0	0	−5	0
31 (Note: Shields wore number 30 in his first game.)	Steve Shields†	G	5	0	0	0		0
42	Karl Stewart	LW	8	0	0	0	−3	15

=== Goaltending ===
No.	Player	Regular season									
No.	Player	GP	W	L	OT	SA	GA	GAA	SV%	SO	TOI
32	Kari Lehtonen	38	20	15	0	1123	106	2.94	.906	2	2166
35	Michael Garnett	24	10	7	4	634	73	3.45	.885	2	1271
1	Mike Dunham	17	8	5	2	336	36	2.77	.893	1	779
33	Adam Berkhoel	9	2	4	1	255	30	3.81	.882	0	473
31	Steve Shields†	5	1	2	1	129	19	4.29	.853	0	266

== Awards and records ==
=== Awards ===
Type	Award/honor	Recipient	Ref
League (in-season)	NHL Offensive Player of the Week	Marc Savard (October 10)	
League (in-season)	NHL Offensive Player of the Week	Ilya Kovalchuk (November 14)	
League (in-season)	NHL Offensive Player of the Week	Marian Hossa (December 26)	
League (in-season)	NHL Offensive Player of the Week	Ilya Kovalchuk (January 9)	
Team	Community Service Award	Ilya Kovalchuk	
Team	Dan Snyder Memorial Trophy	Niclas Havelid	
Team	Players' Player Award	Scott Mellanby	
Team	Team MVP	Marian Hossa	
Team	Team MVP	Ilya Kovalchuk	
Team	Three Stars of the Game Award	Marian Hossa	

=== Milestones ===
Milestone	Player	Date	Ref
First game	Braydon Coburn	October 5, 2005	
First game	Jim Slater	October 5, 2005	
First game	Michael Garnett	October 12, 2005	
First game	Adam Berkhoel	October 15, 2005	
1,000th game played	Peter Bondra	November 11, 2005	

== Transactions ==
The Thrashers were involved in the following transactions from February 17, 2005, the day after the 2004–05 NHL season was officially cancelled, through June 19, 2006, the day of the deciding game of the 2006 Stanley Cup Final.

=== Trades ===
Date	Details		Ref
July 30, 2005	To San Jose Sharks: 1st-round pick in 2005	To Atlanta Thrashers: 1st-round pick in 2005; 2nd-round pick in 2005; 7th-round pick in 2005	
July 30, 2005	To New York Rangers: San Jose’s 1st-round pick in 2005	To Atlanta Thrashers: 1st-round pick in 2005; 2nd-round pick in 2005	
July 30, 2005	To Nashville Predators: 4th-round pick in 2006	To Atlanta Thrashers: Shane Hnidy	
August 23, 2005	To Ottawa Senators: Dany Heatley	To Atlanta Thrashers: Greg de Vries; Marian Hossa	
August 25, 2005	To Anaheim Mighty Ducks: Kip Brennan	To Atlanta Thrashers: Mark Popovic	
March 1, 2006	To Anaheim Mighty Ducks: Jani Hurme	To Atlanta Thrashers: Joel Stepp	
March 9, 2006	To Vancouver Canucks: 4th-round pick in 2007	To Atlanta Thrashers: Steve McCarthy	
June 14, 2006	To Vancouver Canucks: Tommi Santala; 5th-round pick in 2007	To Atlanta Thrashers: Atlanta’s 4th-round pick in 2007	
June 14, 2006	To Minnesota Wild: Petteri Nummelin	To Atlanta Thrashers: Conditional 3rd-round pick in 2006 or 2007	

=== Players acquired ===
Date	Player	Former team	Term	Via	Ref
August 2, 2005	Bobby Holik	New York Rangers	3-year	Free agency	
August 8, 2005	Ramzi Abid	Pittsburgh Penguins		Free agency	
August 8, 2005	Scott Barney	Los Angeles Kings		Free agency	
August 8, 2005	Eric Boulton	Buffalo Sabres		Free agency	
August 9, 2005	Adam Smyth	Chicago Wolves (AHL)		Free agency	
September 2, 2005	Mike Dunham	New York Rangers	1-year	Free agency	
September 18, 2005	Peter Bondra	HK Poprad (Slovakia)	1-year	Free agency	
October 4, 2005	Chris Kunitz	Anaheim Mighty Ducks		Waivers	
October 27, 2005	Steve Shields	Chicago Wolves (AHL)		Free agency	
January 31, 2006	Rico Fata	Pittsburgh Penguins		Waivers	

=== Players lost ===
Date	Player	New team	Via (Note: In parentheses is the player's free agency group on August 1 if applicable.)	Ref
May 5, 2005	Cory Larose	SCL Tigers (NLA)	Free agency (VI)	
August 2, 2005	Shawn McEachern	Boston Bruins	Free agency (III)	
August 10, 2005	Ivan Majesky	Washington Capitals	Free agency (UFA)	
August 11, 2005	Ben Simon	Columbus Blue Jackets	Free agency (UFA)	
August 15, 2005	Daniel Tjarnqvist	Minnesota Wild	Free agency (UFA)	
August 18, 2005	Libor Ustrnul	HC Karlovy Vary (ELH)	Free agency (UFA)	
August 23, 2005	Pasi Nurminen		Retirement (Note: Nurminen suffered a career-ending knee injury while training in Finland.)	
September 10, 2005	Paul Flache	New York Islanders	Free agency (UFA)	
September 27, 2005	Kyle Rossiter	KalPa (Liiga)	Free agency (VI)	
October 18, 2005	Chris Kunitz	Anaheim Mighty Ducks	Waivers	
March 9, 2006	Rico Fata	Washington Capitals	Waivers	

=== Signings ===
Date	Player	Term	Contract type	Ref
July 27, 2005	Guillaume Desbiens		Entry-level	
July 27, 2005	Jimmy Sharrow		Entry-level	
August 9, 2005	Shane Hnidy		Re-signing	
August 9, 2005	Brian Maloney		Re-signing	
August 11, 2005	Tomas Kloucek		Re-signing	
August 11, 2005	Brad Larsen		Re-signing	
August 11, 2005	Francis Lessard		Re-signing	
August 11, 2005	Pasi Nurminen	2-year	Re-signing	
August 11, 2005	Andy Sutton		Re-signing	
August 12, 2005	Stephen Baby		Re-signing	
August 12, 2005	Kevin Doell		Re-signing	
August 12, 2005	Michael Garnett		Re-signing	
August 15, 2005	Jim Slater		Entry-level	
August 16, 2005	Derek MacKenzie		Re-signing	
August 16, 2005	J. P. Vigier		Re-signing	
October 8, 2005	Ilya Kovalchuk	multi-year	Re-signing	
March 29, 2006	Nathan Oystrick		Entry-level	
March 30, 2006	Boris Valabik		Entry-level	
June 1, 2006	Scott Lehman		Entry-level	
June 1, 2006	Chad Painchaud		Entry-level	
June 1, 2006	Dan Turple		Entry-level	
June 7, 2006	Niclas Havelid	3-year	Re-signing	

== Draft picks ==
Atlanta's draft picks at the 2005 NHL entry draft held at the Westin Hotel in Ottawa, Ontario.

Round	#	Player	Nationality	College/Junior/Club team (League)
1	16	Alex Bourret	Canada	Lewiston Maineiacs (QMJHL)
2	41	Ondrej Pavelec	Czech Republic	Rabat Kladno (Czech Republic)
2	49	Chad Denny	Canada	Lewiston Maineiacs (QMJHL)
2	53	Andrew Kozek	Canada	South Surrey Eagles (BCHL)
4	116	Jordan Smotherman	United States	Quebec Remparts (QMJHL)
5	135	Tomas Pospisil	Czech Republic	Oceláři Třinec Jr. (Czech Republic)
6	187	Andrei Zubarev	Russia	Salavat Yulayev Ufa (Russia)
7	207	Myles Stoesz	Canada	Spokane Chiefs (WHL)
