= 2005–06 Montreal Canadiens season =

NHL hockey team season

2005–06 Montreal Canadiens
- Division: 3rd Northeast
- Conference: 7th Eastern
- 2005–06 record: 42–31–9
- Home record: 24–13–4
- Road record: 18–18–5
- Goals for: 243
- Goals against: 247

Team information
- General manager: Bob Gainey
- Coach: Claude Julien (Oct.–Jan.); Bob Gainey (Jan.–May)
- Captain: Saku Koivu
- Alternate captains: Alexei Kovalev; Craig Rivet; Sheldon Souray (Oct.–Jan.); Richard Zednik (Oct.–Jan.)
- Arena: Bell Centre
- Average attendance: 21,273 (100.0%)
- Minor league affiliates: Hamilton Bulldogs; Long Beach Ice Dogs

Team leaders
- Goals: Michael Ryder (30)
- Assists: Saku Koivu (45)
- Points: Alexei Kovalev (65)
- Penalty minutes: Mike Komisarek; Sheldon Souray (116)
- Plus/minus: Andrei Markov (+13)
- Wins: Cristobal Huet (18)
- Goals against average: Cristobal Huet (2.20)

The 2005–06 Montreal Canadiens season was the team's 97th season, 89th in the National Hockey League (NHL). The Canadiens would qualify for the 2006 playoffs, eventually being eliminated in the conference quarterfinals by the eventual Stanley Cup champion Carolina Hurricanes in six games.

== Regular season ==
Claude Julien started the season as coach but was fired and replaced on an interim basis by general manager Bob Gainey on January 14. The Canadiens's number one goaltender Jose Theodore was traded to the Colorado Avalanche. His place was taken by Cristobal Huet. Huet would lead the league in save percentage of 92.9% and placed fourth overall in goals against average of 2.20.

=== Final standings ===
Northeast Division
No.	CR		GP	W	L	OTL	GF	GA	Pts
1	1	**Ottawa Senators**	82	52	21	9	314	211	113
2	4	**Buffalo Sabres**	82	52	24	6	281	239	110
3	7	**Montreal Canadiens**	82	42	31	9	243	247	93
4	9	Toronto Maple Leafs	82	41	33	8	257	270	90
5	13	Boston Bruins	82	29	37	16	230	266	74

Note: CR = Conference rank; GP = Games played; W = Wins; L = Losses; OTL = Overtime/Shootout loss; GF = Goals for; GA = Goals against; Pts = Points
Bolded teams qualified for the playoffs.

Eastern Conference
R		Div	GP	W	L	OTL	GF	GA	Pts
**1**	**Z-** Ottawa Senators	**NE**	**82**	**52**	**21**	**9**	**314**	**211**	113
**2**	**Y-** Carolina Hurricanes	**SE**	**82**	**52**	**22**	**8**	**294**	**260**	112
**3**	**Y-** New Jersey Devils	**AT**	**82**	**46**	**27**	**9**	**242**	**229**	101
**4**	**X-** Buffalo Sabres	**NE**	**82**	**52**	**24**	**6**	**242**	**239**	110
**5**	**X-** Philadelphia Flyers	**AT**	**82**	**45**	**26**	**11**	**267**	**259**	101
**6**	**X-** New York Rangers	**AT**	**82**	**44**	**26**	**12**	**257**	**215**	100
**7**	**X-** Montreal Canadiens	**NE**	**82**	**42**	**31**	**9**	**243**	**247**	93
**8**	**X-** Tampa Bay Lightning	**SE**	**82**	**43**	**33**	**6**	**252**	**260**	92
8.5
9	Toronto Maple Leafs	NE	82	41	33	8	257	270	90
10	Atlanta Thrashers	SE	82	41	33	8	281	275	90
11	Florida Panthers	SE	82	37	34	11	240	257	85
12	New York Islanders	AT	82	36	40	6	230	278	78
13	Boston Bruins	NE	82	29	37	16	230	266	74
14	Washington Capitals	SE	82	29	41	12	237	306	70
15	Pittsburgh Penguins	AT	82	22	46	14	244	316	58

Divisions: AT – Atlantic, NE – Northeast, SE – Southeast

Z – Clinched conference; Y – Clinched division; X – Clinched playoff spot

== Schedule and results ==
=== Regular season ===
2005–06 regular season
October: 8–3–1 (home: 3–3–0; road: 5–0–1)

Game	Date	Score	Opponent	Record	Recap
1	October 5, 2005	2–1	@ Boston Bruins (2005–06)	1–0–0	W
2	October 6, 2005	4–3 OT	@ New York Rangers (2005–06)	2–0–0	W
3	October 8, 2005	5–4	@ Toronto Maple Leafs (2005–06)	3–0–0	W
4	October 11, 2005	2–4	Ottawa Senators (2005–06)	3–1–0	L
5	October 12, 2005	2–0	@ Atlanta Thrashers (2005–06)	4–1–0	W
6	October 15, 2005	2–3	Toronto Maple Leafs (2005–06)	4–2–0	L
7	October 18, 2005	4–3	Boston Bruins (2005–06)	5–2–0	W
8	October 22, 2005	4–3	New York Islanders (2005–06)	6–2–0	W
9	October 25, 2005	3–2 OT	Philadelphia Flyers (2005–06)	7–2–0	W
10	October 27, 2005	3–4 OT	@ Ottawa Senators (2005–06)	7–2–1	OTL
11	October 29, 2005	2–5	New York Rangers (2005–06)	7–3–1	L
12	October 31, 2005	4–1	@ New York Rangers (2005–06)	8–3–1	W

November: 6–4–3 (home: 5–1–1; road: 1–3–2)

Game	Date	Score	Opponent	Record	Recap
13	November 1, 2005	5–4 OT	Florida Panthers (2005–06)	9–3–1	W
14	November 4, 2005	3–2	@ Buffalo Sabres (2005–06)	10–3–1	W
15	November 5, 2005	3–2	Buffalo Sabres (2005–06)	11–3–1	W
16	November 8, 2005	3–2	Tampa Bay Lightning (2005–06)	12–3–1	W
17	November 10, 2005	2–3 SO	@ Pittsburgh Penguins (2005–06)	12–3–2	OTL
18	November 12, 2005	4–5 OT	Toronto Maple Leafs (2005–06)	12–3–3	OTL
19	November 15, 2005	4–3 OT	Florida Panthers (2005–06)	13–3–3	W
20	November 18, 2005	3–5	@ New Jersey Devils (2005–06)	13–4–3	L
21	November 19, 2005	1–5	Washington Capitals (2005–06)	13–5–3	L
22	November 22, 2005	3–2 SO	Atlanta Thrashers (2005–06)	14–5–3	W
23	November 25, 2005	1–3	@ Buffalo Sabres (2005–06)	14–6–3	L
24	November 26, 2005	3–4 OT	@ Toronto Maple Leafs (2005–06)	14–6–4	OTL
25	November 29, 2005	0–4	@ Ottawa Senators (2005–06)	14–7–4	L

December: 4–6–2 (home: 3–1–1; road: 1–5–1)

Game	Date	Score	Opponent	Record	Recap
26	December 1, 2005	2–3 OT	Buffalo Sabres (2005–06)	14–7–5	OTL
27	December 3, 2005	3–2	Los Angeles Kings (2005–06)	15–7–5	W
28	December 10, 2005	3–5	Mighty Ducks of Anaheim (2005–06)	15–8–5	L
29	December 13, 2005	5–2	Phoenix Coyotes (2005–06)	16–8–5	W
30	December 15, 2005	3–5	@ Edmonton Oilers (2005–06)	16–9–5	L
31	December 17, 2005	3–4 OT	@ Minnesota Wild (2005–06)	16–9–6	OTL
32	December 20, 2005	4–3 SO	Ottawa Senators (2005–06)	17–9–6	W
33	December 23, 2005	2–4	@ Washington Capitals (2005–06)	17–10–6	L
34	December 26, 2005	0–4	@ Atlanta Thrashers (2005–06)	17–11–6	L
35	December 28, 2005	4–3	@ Tampa Bay Lightning (2005–06)	18–11–6	W
36	December 30, 2005	1–2	@ Florida Panthers (2005–06)	18–12–6	L
37	December 31, 2005	3–5	@ Carolina Hurricanes (2005–06)	18–13–6	L

January: 5–8–0 (home: 3–2–0; road: 2–6–0)

Game	Date	Score	Opponent	Record	Recap
38	January 3, 2006	4–6	Pittsburgh Penguins (2005–06)	18–14–6	L
39	January 5, 2006	4–5	@ New Jersey Devils (2005–06)	18–15–6	L
40	January 7, 2006	4–1	Ottawa Senators (2005–06)	19–15–6	W
41	January 11, 2006	1–2	@ Colorado Avalanche (2005–06)	19–16–6	L
42	January 14, 2006	6–2	San Jose Sharks (2005–06)	20–16–6	W
43	January 16, 2006	4–2	Dallas Stars (2005–06)	21–16–6	W
44	January 19, 2006	2–3	@ Calgary Flames (2005–06)	21–17–6	L
45	January 21, 2006	2–6	@ Vancouver Canucks (2005–06)	21–18–6	L
46	January 23, 2006	3–7	@ Carolina Hurricanes (2005–06)	21–19–6	L
47	January 25, 2006	5–3	@ Philadelphia Flyers (2005–06)	22–19–6	W
48	January 26, 2006	0–3	@ Ottawa Senators (2005–06)	22–20–6	L
49	January 28, 2006	4–3 OT	@ Toronto Maple Leafs (2005–06)	23–20–6	W
50	January 31, 2006	2–8	Carolina Hurricanes (2005–06)	23–21–6	L

February: 4–1–2 (home: 2–0–2; road: 2–1–0)

Game	Date	Score	Opponent	Record	Recap
51	February 2, 2006	1–3	@ Boston Bruins (2005–06)	23–22–6	L
52	February 4, 2006	2–0	Boston Bruins (2005–06)	24–22–6	W
53	February 5, 2006	5–0	Philadelphia Flyers (2005–06)	25–22–6	W
54	February 7, 2006	2–3 OT	Buffalo Sabres (2005–06)	25–22–7	OTL
55	February 9, 2006	3–2 OT	@ Buffalo Sabres (2005–06)	26–22–7	W
56	February 11, 2006	1–2 SO	Atlanta Thrashers (2005–06)	26–22–8	OTL
57	February 28, 2006	5–3	@ New York Islanders (2005–06)	27–22–8	W

March: 10–5–1 (home: 5–3–0; road: 5–2–1)

Game	Date	Score	Opponent	Record	Recap
58	March 2, 2006	1–0	@ Florida Panthers (2005–06)	28–22–8	W
59	March 4, 2006	6–2	@ Tampa Bay Lightning (2005–06)	29–22–8	W
60	March 6, 2006	4–5 SO	@ Philadelphia Flyers (2005–06)	29–22–9	OTL
61	March 7, 2006	3–5	@ Toronto Maple Leafs (2005–06)	29–23–9	L
62	March 9, 2006	3–0	@ Boston Bruins (2005–06)	30–23–9	W
63	March 11, 2006	1–0	New York Rangers (2005–06)	31–23–9	W
64	March 13, 2006	1–2	Tampa Bay Lightning (2005–06)	31–24–9	L
65	March 16, 2006	1–5	Carolina Hurricanes (2005–06)	31–25–9	L
66	March 18, 2006	4–5	Pittsburgh Penguins (2005–06)	31–26–9	L
67	March 20, 2006	4–2	@ Washington Capitals (2005–06)	32–26–9	W
68	March 21, 2006	1–3	@ New York Islanders (2005–06)	32–27–9	L
69	March 23, 2006	5–1	Toronto Maple Leafs (2005–06)	33–27–9	W
70	March 25, 2006	6–2	Toronto Maple Leafs (2005–06)	34–27–9	W
71	March 26, 2006	6–5	@ Pittsburgh Penguins (2005–06)	35–27–9	W
72	March 28, 2006	2–0	New York Islanders (2005–06)	36–27–9	W
73	March 30, 2006	3–2 OT	Washington Capitals (2005–06)	37–27–9	W

April: 5–4–0 (home: 3–3–0; road: 2–1–0)

Game	Date	Score	Opponent	Record	Recap
74	April 1, 2006	2–0	Boston Bruins (2005–06)	38–27–9	W
75	April 4, 2006	5–3	Boston Bruins (2005–06)	39–27–9	W
76	April 6, 2006	5–3	@ Ottawa Senators (2005–06)	40–27–9	W
77	April 8, 2006	2–3	New Jersey Devils (2005–06)	40–28–9	L
78	April 10, 2006	3–2	Ottawa Senators (2005–06)	41–28–9	W
79	April 12, 2006	1–3	@ Buffalo Sabres (2005–06)	41–29–9	L
80	April 13, 2006	4–3	@ Boston Bruins (2005–06)	42–29–9	W
81	April 15, 2006	2–4	Buffalo Sabres (2005–06)	42–30–9	L
82	April 18, 2006	3–4	New Jersey Devils (2005–06)	42–31–9	L

Legend: W Win (2 points) L Loss (0 points) OTL Overtime/shootout loss (1 point)

== Playoffs ==
The Canadiens placed 3rd in the Northeast division, and seventh in the Eastern Conference. The Canadiens played the eventual Stanley Cup champion Carolina Hurricanes in the first round and lost four games to two. The Canadiens were winning 2–0 in the series when Saku Koivu sustained a serious injury to his left eye. Hurricanes forward Justin Williams attempted to lift Koivu's stick but instead struck him in the eye. Koivu was rushed to the hospital, where he would remain overnight and for the remainder of the playoffs. Koivu remained out of the lineup for the rest of the series and underwent surgery to repair a detached retina during the off-season.

=== Eastern Conference Quarterfinals: vs. (2) Carolina Hurricanes ===
2006 Stanley Cup playoffs
Eastern Conference Quarterfinals vs. (2) Carolina Hurricanes – Hurricanes win 4–2

Game	Date	Score	Opponent	Series	Recap
1	April 22, 2006	6–1	@ Carolina Hurricanes	Canadiens lead 1–0	W
2	April 24, 2006	6–5 OT	@ Carolina Hurricanes	Canadiens lead 2–0	W
3	April 26, 2006	1–2 OT	Carolina Hurricanes	Canadiens lead 2–1	L
4	April 28, 2006	2–3	Carolina Hurricanes	Series tied 2–2	L
5	April 30, 2006	1–2	@ Carolina Hurricanes	Hurricanes lead 3–2	L
6	May 2, 2006	1–2 OT	Carolina Hurricanes	Hurricanes win 4–2	L

Legend: W Win L Loss

== Player statistics ==
=== Scoring ===
- Position abbreviations: C = Centre; D = Defence; G = Goaltender; LW = Left wing; RW = Right wing
- † = Joined team via a transaction (e.g., trade, waivers, signing) during the season. Stats reflect time with the Canadiens only.
- ‡ = Left team via a transaction (e.g., trade, waivers, release) during the season. Stats reflect time with the Canadiens only.

No.	Player	Pos	Regular season						Playoffs					
No.	Player	Pos	GP	G	A	Pts	+/-	PIM	GP	G	A	Pts	+/-	PIM
27	Alexei Kovalev	RW	69	23	42	65	−1	76	6	4	3	7	3	4
11	Saku Koivu	C	72	17	45	62	1	70	3	0	2	2	1	2
73	Michael Ryder	RW	81	30	25	55	−5	40	6	2	3	5	−4	0
71	Mike Ribeiro	LW	79	16	35	51	−6	36	6	0	2	2	1	0
79	Andrei Markov	D	67	10	36	46	13	74	6	0	1	1	2	4
38	Jan Bulis	LW	73	20	20	40	2	50	6	1	1	2	1	2
44	Sheldon Souray	D	75	12	27	39	−11	116	6	3	2	5	−1	8
21	Chris Higgins	C	80	23	15	38	−1	26	6	1	3	4	−3	0
52	Craig Rivet	D	82	7	27	34	−5	109	6	0	2	2	0	2
20	Richard Zednik	RW	67	16	14	30	−2	48	6	2	0	2	0	4
35	Tomas Plekanec	LW	67	9	20	29	4	32	6	0	4	4	2	6
22	Steve Begin	C	76	11	12	23	9	113	2	0	0	0	−1	2
51	Francis Bouillon	D	67	3	19	22	−6	34	6	1	2	3	0	10
14	Radek Bonk	C	61	6	15	21	−3	52	6	2	0	2	−1	2
25	Mathieu Dandenault	D	82	5	15	20	8	83	6	0	3	3	1	4
42	Alexander Perezhogin	RW	67	9	10	19	5	38	6	1	1	2	2	4
37	Niklas Sundstrom	RW	55	6	9	15	−6	30	5	0	3	3	3	4
26	Pierre Dagenais	RW	32	5	7	12	−5	16	—	—	—	—	—	—
32	Mark Streit	D	48	2	9	11	−6	28	1	0	0	0	0	0
57	Garth Murray	C	36	5	1	6	−2	44	6	0	0	0	2	0
8	Mike Komisarek	D	71	2	4	6	−1	116	6	0	0	0	2	10
47	Aaron Downey†	RW	25	1	4	5	2	50	1	0	0	0	0	0
46	Andrei Kostitsyn	RW	12	2	1	3	1	2	—	—	—	—	—	—
86	Jonathan Ferland	RW	7	1	0	1	−2	2	—	—	—	—	—	—
60	Jose Theodore‡	G	38	0	1	1		2	—	—	—	—	—	—
30	David Aebischer†	G	7	0	0	0		0	—	—	—	—	—	—
64	Jean-Philippe Cote	D	8	0	0	0	2	4	—	—	—	—	—	—
75	Yann Danis	G	6	0	0	0		0	—	—	—	—	—	—
39	Cristobal Huet	G	36	0	0	0		0	6	0	0	0		0
3	Raitis Ivanans	D	4	0	0	0	−1	9	—	—	—	—	—	—
40	Maxim Lapierre	C	1	0	0	0	−1	0	—	—	—	—	—	—
24	Todd Simpson†	D	6	0	0	0	0	14	—	—	—	—	—	—

=== Goaltending ===
- † = Joined team via a transaction (e.g., trade, waivers, signing) during the season. Stats reflect time with the Canadiens only.
- ‡ = Left team via a transaction (e.g., trade, waivers, release) during the season. Stats reflect time with the Canadiens only.

No.	Player	Regular season										Playoffs								
No.	Player	GP	W	L	OT	SA	GA	GAA	SV%	SO	TOI	GP	W	L	SA	GA	GAA	SV%	SO	TOI
39	Cristobal Huet	36	18	11	4	1008	77	2.20	.929	7	2103	6	2	4	212	15	2.33	.929	0	386
60	Jose Theodore‡	38	17	15	5	1025	122	3.46	.881	0	2114	—	—	—	—	—	—	—	—	—
30	David Aebischer†	7	4	3	0	240	26	3.73	.892	0	418	—	—	—	—	—	—	—	—	—
75	Yann Danis	6	3	2	0	152	14	2.69	.908	1	312	—	—	—	—	—	—	—	—	—

== Awards and records ==
=== Awards ===
Type	Award/honour	Recipient	Ref
League (annual)	Roger Crozier Saving Grace Award	Cristobal Huet	
League (in-season)	NHL Defensive Player of the Week	Cristobal Huet (March 6)	
League (in-season)	NHL Defensive Player of the Week	Cristobal Huet (April 3)	
Team	Jacques Beauchamp Molson Trophy	Steve Begin	
Team	Molson Cup	Saku Koivu	

=== Milestones ===
Milestone	Player	Date	Ref
First game	Alexander Perezhogin	October 6, 2005	
First game	Raitis Ivanans	October 8, 2005	
First game	Mark Streit	October 8, 2005	
First game	Yann Danis	October 12, 2005	
First game	Maxim Lapierre	November 15, 2005	
First game	Jean-Philippe Cote	November 29, 2005	
First game	Andrei Kostitsyn	December 1, 2005	
First game	Jonathan Ferland	January 3, 2006	

== Transactions ==
The Canadiens were involved in the following transactions from February 17, 2005, the day after the 2004–05 NHL season was officially cancelled, through June 19, 2006, the day of the deciding game of the 2006 Stanley Cup Finals.

=== Trades ===
Date	Details		Ref
July 30, 2005	To New York Rangers: 2nd-round pick in 2005; 3rd-round pick in 2005	To Montreal Canadiens: 2nd-round pick in 2005	
September 30, 2005	To New York Rangers: Marcel Hossa	To Montreal Canadiens: Garth Murray	
March 8, 2006	To Colorado Avalanche: Jose Theodore	To Montreal Canadiens: David Aebischer	
March 9, 2006	To Chicago Blackhawks: 6th-round pick in 2006	To Montreal Canadiens: Todd Simpson	

=== Players acquired ===
Date	Player	Former team	Term	Via	Ref
August 2, 2005	Pete Vandermeer	Detroit Red Wings	1-year	Free agency	
August 3, 2005	Mathieu Dandenault	Detroit Red Wings	4-year	Free agency	
August 16, 2005	Johnathan Aitken	Vancouver Canucks	1-year	Free agency	
September 7, 2005	Jeff Paul	Washington Capitals	1-year	Free agency	
December 8, 2005	Francis Lemieux	Hamilton Bulldogs (AHL)	3-year	Free agency	
January 9, 2006	Andre Benoit	Hamilton Bulldogs (AHL)	3-year	Free agency	
January 23, 2006	Aaron Downey	St. Louis Blues		Waivers	
March 2, 2006	James Sanford	Hamilton Bulldogs (AHL)	2-year	Free agency	

=== Players lost ===
Date	Player	New team	Via (Note: In parentheses is the player's free agency group on August 1 if applicable.)	Ref
June 20, 2005	Marc-Andre Thinel	Dragons de Rouen (Ligue Magnus)	Free agency (II) (Note: Montreal retained Thinel’s NHL rights through the 2007–08 season.)	
August 3, 2005	Patrice Brisebois	Colorado Avalanche	Free agency (III)	
August 4, 2005	Jason Ward	New York Rangers	Free agency (UFA)	
August 25, 2005	Karl Dykhuis	Adler Mannheim (DEL)	Free agency (III)	
August 29, 2005	Gavin Morgan	EHC Basel (NLA)	Free agency (VI)	
August 29, 2005	Matt Shasby	Alaska Aces (ECHL)	Free agency (UFA)	
August 30, 2005	Christian Larrivee	Long Beach Ice Dogs (ECHL)	Free agency (UFA)	
November 29, 2005	Ron Hainsey	Columbus Blue Jackets	Waivers	
June 7, 2006	Niklas Sundstrom	Modo Hockey (SHL)	Free agency	

=== Signings ===
Date	Player	Term	Contract type	Ref
July 28, 2005	Jimmy Bonneau	3-year	Entry-level	
July 28, 2005	Maxim Lapierre	3-year	Entry-level	
August 2, 2005	Francis Bouillon	1-year	Re-signing	
August 3, 2005	Alexei Kovalev	4-year	Re-signing	
August 8, 2005	Pierre Dagenais	1-year	Re-signing	
August 11, 2005	Jaroslav Halak	3-year	Entry-level	
August 11, 2005	Mike Komisarek	1-year	Re-signing	
August 11, 2005	Mike Ribeiro	1-year	Re-signing	
August 12, 2005	Jan Bulis	1-year	Re-signing	
August 15, 2005	Marcel Hossa	1-year	Re-signing	
August 15, 2005	Saku Koivu	1-year	Re-signing	
August 16, 2005	Tomas Plekanec	2-year	Re-signing	
August 24, 2005	Mark Streit	1-year	Entry-level	
August 25, 2005	Andrei Markov	2-year	Re-signing	
September 2, 2005	Jose Theodore	3-year	Re-signing	
September 12, 2005	Michael Ryder	1-year	Re-signing	
February 11, 2006	Saku Koivu	3-year	Extension	
March 25, 2006	Kyle Chipchura	3-year	Entry-level	
May 30, 2006	Loic Lacasse	3-year	Entry-level	
May 30, 2006	Greg Stewart	3-year	Entry-level	
June 5, 2006	Steve Begin	3-year	Re-signing	
June 5, 2006	Aaron Downey	1-year	Re-signing	
June 5, 2006	Garth Murray	2-year	Re-signing	
June 7, 2006	Mark Streit	2-year	Re-signing	

== Draft picks ==
Montreal's draft picks at the 2005 NHL entry draft held at the Westin Hotel in Ottawa, Ontario.

Round	#	Player	Nationality	College/Junior/Club team (League)
1	5	Carey Price	Canada	Tri-City Americans (WHL)
2	45	Guillaume Latendresse	Canada	Drummondville Voltigeurs (QMJHL)
4	121	Juraj Mikus	Slovakia	HK 36 Skalica Jr. (Slovakia)
5	130	Mathieu Aubin	Canada	Lewiston Maineiacs (QMJHL)
6	190	Matt D'Agostini	Canada	Guelph Storm (OHL)
7	200	Sergei Kostitsyn	Belarus	HK Gomel (Belarusian Extraleague)
7	229	Philippe Paquet	Canada	Salisbury School (USHS-CT)

== See also ==
- 2005–06 NHL season
