= Brian Eklund =

American ice hockey player (born 1980)

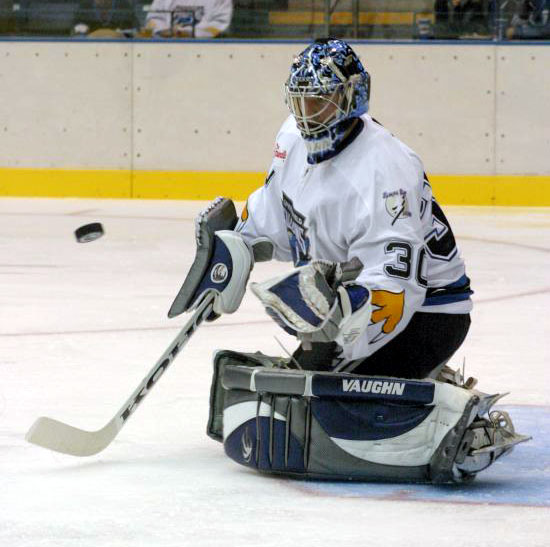
- Eklund with the Springfield Falcons in 2005
- Born: May 24, 1980 (age 46) Braintree, Massachusetts, U.S.
- Height: 6 ft 4 in (193 cm)
- Weight: 211 lb (96 kg; 15 st 1 lb)
- Position: Goaltender
- Caught: Left
- Played for: Tampa Bay Lightning
- NHL draft: 226th overall, 2000; Tampa Bay Lightning
- Playing career: 2002–2006
- Coaching career

Current position
- Title: Assistant coach
- Team: Boston University
- Conference: Hockey East

Biographical details
- Education: Brown University

Coaching career (HC unless noted)
- 2013–2016: Harvard (assistant)
- 2016–Present: Boston University (assistant)

Brian M. Eklund (born May 24, 1980) is an American former professional ice hockey goaltender who played in one National Hockey League (NHL) game with the Tampa Bay Lightning during the 2005–06 season. He currently runs his own goalie school, Massachusetts Crease Goaltending School, as well as being an assistant and goalie coach for the Brown Bears men's ice hockey team.

== Playing career ==
As a youth, Eklund played in the 1994 Quebec International Pee-Wee Hockey Tournament with a minor ice hockey team from Hobomock in Pembroke, Massachusetts.

After four seasons at Brown University, Eklund signed a two-year rookie contract with the Tampa Bay Lightning. He was then assigned by the Lightning to the Pensacola Ice Pilots of the ECHL. In his first season with the Ice Pilots (2002–03), he was the back up to Maxime Gingras. He played in 19 games and posted a 10–6–0 record with a 3.66 goals-against average and a .896 save percentage. When the Ice Pilots concluded their season after being eliminated in the playoffs, he was called up to the Springfield Falcons of the AHL. He appeared in one game allowing only one goal and getting the win.

In the 2003–04 campaign, Gingras did not return to Pensacola leaving the #1 goalie slot open for contest. Eklund battled fellow Lightning prospect Evgeny Konstantinov for the #1 slot. He easily won the job. He appeared in all but 10 of the Ice Pilots' 72 regular-season games. This feat ranks second overall in the ECHL for games played in a season. As the top goalie, he shone even though the team lacked defense at times. He finished the season with a 38–17–7 record with a 3.01 GAA and a .921 SV%.

In 2004–05, Eklund spent the whole season with the Falcons, after signing a new one-year deal with the Lightning. He played 43 games going 14–23–0 with a 3.01 GAA and a .911 SV%. The team struggled that year notching only 24 wins in 80 games for a record of 24–53–3. Despite the team's struggles Brian was named team MVP.

In 2005–06, Eklund was the backup goalie behind both Jonathan Boutin and Gerald Coleman at different times of the season. He also played two games for the Johnstown Chiefs of the ECHL. This was, however, the season he was called up to the NHL to play his first and only NHL game. He allowed 3 goals and made 16 saves in 58 minutes of play. However, he lost the game. He was traded to the Boston Bruins of the NHL who then assigned him to their AHL team, the Providence Bruins where he played 12 games going 3–6–1 with a 3.52 GAA and a .870 SV%.

== Post-playing career ==
Eklund is currently the director of Newton Youth Hockey's Goaltending Focus with Brian Eklund. He has also started his own goaltending school, known as the Massachusetts Crease Goalie School. He also served as an assistant coach for his alma mater, Brown University.

== Career statistics ==
=== Regular season and playoffs ===
| | | | Regular season | | | | | | | | | | Playoffs |
| Season | Team | League | GP | W | L | T | OTL | MIN | GA | SO | GAA | SV% | GP | W | L | MIN | GA | SO | GAA | SV% |
|---|---|---|---|---|---|---|---|---|---|---|---|---|---|---|---|---|---|---|---|---|
| 1997–98 | Archbishop Williams High School | HS-MA | 22 | — | — | — | — | 1320 | 40 | 6 | 1.84 | — | — | — | — | — | — | — | — | — |
| 1998–99 | Brown University | ECAC | 8 | 1 | 3 | 0 | — | 299 | 17 | 0 | 3.41 | .880 | — | — | — | — | — | — | — | — |
| 1999–00 | Brown University | ECAC | 12 | 1 | 6 | 2 | — | 569 | 28 | 1 | 2.95 | .915 | — | — | — | — | — | — | — | — |
| 2000–01 | Brown University | ECAC | 19 | 2 | 13 | 3 | — | 1084 | 62 | 0 | 3.43 | .902 | — | — | — | — | — | — | — | — |
| 2001–02 | Brown University | ECAC | 9 | 3 | 5 | 0 | — | 454 | 30 | 0 | 3.97 | .871 | — | — | — | — | — | — | — | — |
| 2002–03 | Springfield Falcons | AHL | 1 | 1 | 0 | 0 | — | 60 | 1 | 0 | 1.00 | .974 | — | — | — | — | — | — | — | — |
| 2002–03 | Pensacola Ice Pilots | ECHL | 19 | 10 | 6 | 0 | — | 999 | 61 | 0 | 3.66 | .896 | — | — | — | — | — | — | — | — |
| 2003–04 | Pensacola Ice Pilots | ECHL | 62 | 38 | 17 | 7 | — | 3725 | 187 | 1 | 3.01 | .921 | 5 | 2 | 3 | 333 | 16 | 0 | 2.88 | .931 |
| 2004–05 | Springfield Falcons | AHL | 43 | 14 | 23 | 0 | — | 2416 | 121 | 0 | 3.01 | .911 | — | — | — | — | — | — | — | — |
| 2005–06 | Tampa Bay Lightning | NHL | 1 | 0 | 1 | — | 0 | 58 | 3 | 0 | 3.09 | .842 | — | — | — | — | — | — | — | — |
| 2005–06 | Springfield Falcons | AHL | 17 | 5 | 11 | — | 1 | 960 | 67 | 0 | 4.19 | .876 | — | — | — | — | — | — | — | — |
| 2005–06 | Johnstown Chiefs | ECHL | 2 | 1 | 0 | — | 1 | 130 | 7 | 0 | 3.23 | .913 | — | — | — | — | — | — | — | — |
| 2005–06 | Providence Bruins | AHL | 12 | 3 | 6 | — | 1 | 597 | 35 | 0 | 3.52 | .870 | — | — | — | — | — | — | — | — |
| NHL totals | | | 1 | 0 | 1 | — | 0 | 59 | 3 | 0 | 3.09 | .842 | — | — | — | — | — | — | — | — |
