= Andy Hedlund =

American ice hockey player (born 1978)

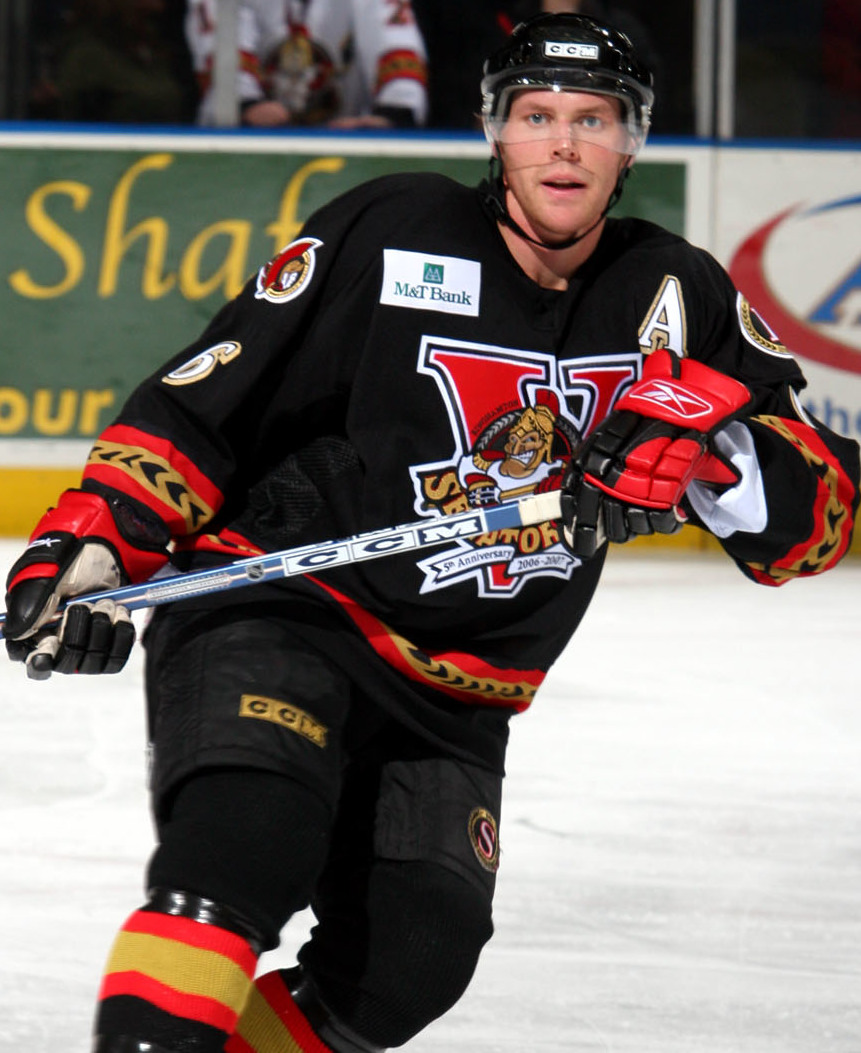
- Hedlund with the Binghamton Senators during the 2006–07 season
- Born: May 16, 1978 (age 48) Osseo, Minnesota, U.S.
- Height: 6 ft 2 in (188 cm)
- Weight: 216 lb (98 kg; 15 st 6 lb)
- Position: Defense
- Shot: Right
- Played for: Binghamton Senators; Krefeld Pinguine; Hershey Bears; Adler Mannheim; DEG Metro Stars; EHC Black Wings Linz
- NHL draft: Undrafted
- Playing career: 2001–2014

Andy Hedlund (born May 16, 1978, in Osseo, Minnesota) is an American former professional ice hockey player. He was a defenseman for the Trenton Titans, Binghamton Senators, Hershey Bears, Krefeld Pinguine, Adler Mannheim, DEG Metro Stars and EHC Black Wings Linz in his career.

Hedlund began his career playing for the Fargo-Moorhead Ice Sharks of the United States Hockey League before moving onto Minnesota State University, Mankato, for college. Playing in three years for Minnesota State–Mankato, he totaled 15 goals and 18 assists in 111 games. Following college he was signed by the Ottawa Senators and was assigned to the Trenton Titans. He played in 15 games for the Titans for parts of two seasons, recording one goal and an assist before being called up to the Binghamton Senators. Hedlund played three seasons in Binghamton, recording seven goals and 39 assists in 214 games. After going unsigned by an NHL team, Hedlund signed with the Krefeld Penguins of Deutsche Eishockey Liga (DEL) in Germany. He spent one season with the Penguins, playing in 52 games and scoring a career-high 12 goals and 22 assists. In June 2006, Hedlund re-signed with Ottawa and played 56 games with Binghamton scoring six goals, adding 21 assists. Ottawa traded Hedlund to the Washington Capitals midway through the season where he joined the Capitals affiliate. He left the Capitals organization following the season and went back to Germany, playing two seasons for the DEG Metro Stars.

== Playing career ==
=== College ===
Hedlund played collegiately at Minnesota State–Mankato. His first career goal came on February 28, 1999, during his sophomore season. He ended that season with four goals, two assists and 58 penalty minutes in 36 games. At the start of his junior season, Hedlund was elevated to first line. Head coach Troy Jutting said of him, "He had a good freshman and sophomore season for us, where maybe he wasn't counted on to be one of the top two, three guys. This year, he will be and I think he's ready for that." In his junior season, Hedlund played in 38 games, scoring six goals with six assists and 64 penalty minutes. As a senior in the 2001–02 season, he scored five goals with 10 assists and 48 penalty minutes while playing in 37 games.

=== Professional ===
==== 2001–2004 ====
After graduating, Hedlund signed with the Trenton Titans of the East Coast Hockey League for the final games of the 2001–02 season. He played in two games as a rookie and did not record a stat during the regular season, but in six playoff games he spent six minutes in the penalty box. In the 2002–03 season, he played in 13 games for Trenton recording a goal and two assists before he was called up to the American Hockey League's Binghamton Senators. In Binghamton, he played in 59 games scoring one goal and adding seven assists. On January 16, 2004, against the Albany River Rats, Hedlund broke a 17-game streak in which he had gone scoreless after he recorded his first career overtime goal and his second career game-winner. His previous goal was a game-winning shot against Syracuse. He ended the 2003–04 season with four goals and 19 assists in 80 games. Before the 2004–05 season, Hedlund spent time in training camp with the Ottawa Senators before he was reassigned to Binghamton. The NHL season would eventually be locked out which saw players such as goaltender Dominik Hašek join the AHL. When Hasek began working out with Binghamton, Hedlund commented, "He's just one of the guys when he's here, he just wants to put in his time and get some good work in, and make sure he's ready to go, so you just got to appreciate a guy like that being here and doing that kind of work, so its pretty fun." A season preview produced by the website Hockey's Future commented about Hedlund saying that, "A fan-favorite, Hedlund gives it everything he has despite limited talent." Against the Manitoba Moose on October 31, Hedlund scored a goal from the blue line that tied the game, however the Senators ended up losing 5–3. Following the season, he and Philadelphia Phantoms player Ben Stafford were named the AHL's Men of the Year. During the season he played in 75 games, scoring two goals with 13 assists. In the playoffs, he played in six games recording two assists.

==== 2005–2007 ====
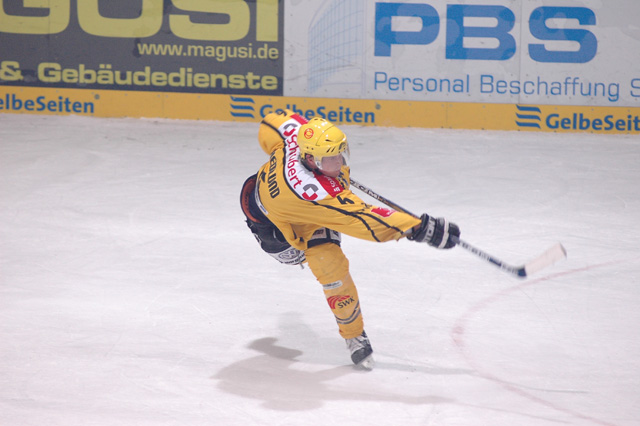
Hedlund with Krefeld Pinguine

To begin the 2005 season, Hedlund joined the U. S. Men's National Select Team. After his stint with Team USA, Hedlund left the Senators organization and joined the Krefeld Penguins in Germany. In only one season with Krefeld, Hedlund played in 52 games scoring 12 goals and 22 assists, both career-highs. He also played in five playoff games, recording two assists.

Hedlund re-signed with Ottawa on June 20, 2006. However, he was waived on October 2. He cleared waivers a day later and was assigned to Binghamton. Against Syracuse on January 15, Hedlund helped Binghamton rally to a 3–2 lead with a goal in the third period. However, the Senators ended up losing the game in a shootout. In one of his final games for the Senators on February 23, Hedlund scored a goal against the Wilkes-Barre/Scranton Penguins. Before being traded, Hedlund recorded six goals and 21 assists in 56 games.

The Washington Capitals traded for Hedlund and a sixth-round draft pick in the 2007 NHL entry draft on February 26, 2007, sending Lawrence Nycholat to Ottawa. Hedlund recorded eight assists in 21 games for the Bears. He left the team after the season, opting to return to Germany.

==== 2007–2014 ====
Hedlund joined the DEG Metro Stars of the DEL but before joining the team, he rejoined Team USA. Hedlund scored a goal for the team on November 8 that helped the USA defeat Germany, 3–2. He ended the 2007–08 season with 12 goals and 23 assists in 55 games for the Metro Stars. In the 2008–09 season, Hedlund scored nine goals with 19 assists in 52 games with DEG. Following the season, he left DEG and joined Adler Mannheim. During his two seasons with the Metro Stars, he was a DEL All-Star.

Hedlund spent the 2009–10 season with Adler Mannheim, scoring six goals with nine assists in 54 games. He returned to DEG after the season. In his final season with the Metro Stars in 2011–12, Hedlund led the DEL with 14 goals amongst defensemen.

On May 10, 2012, Hedlund left the DEL to sign a one-year contract with EHC Black Wings Linz of the Austrian Hockey League. At the conclusion of his second season with Linz in 2013–14 season, Hedlund announced his retirement from professional hockey after 13 seasons.

== Personal ==
In July 2008, Hedlund returned to Minnesota State–Mankato to help out at a hockey camp in which he taught players one-time shooting and passing. Hedlund's mother works as a special education teacher, and his sister is a social worker.

== Career statistics ==
=== Regular season and playoffs ===
			Regular season					Playoffs
Season	Team	League	GP	G	A	Pts	PIM	GP	G	A	Pts	PIM
1997–98	Fargo-Moorhead Ice Sharks	USHL	56	4	12	16	135	4	0	4	4	0
1999–00	Minnesota State, Mankato Mavericks	WCHA	36	4	2	6	58	—	—	—	—	—
2000–01	Minnesota State, Mankato Mavericks	WCHA	38	6	6	12	64	—	—	—	—	—
2001–02	Minnesota State, Mankato Mavericks	WCHA	37	5	10	15	48	—	—	—	—	—
2001–02	Trenton Titans	ECHL	2	0	0	0	0	6	0	0	0	6
2002–03	Trenton Titans	ECHL	13	1	2	3	14	—	—	—	—	—
2002–03	Binghamton Senators	AHL	59	1	7	8	48	10	0	0	0	0
2003–04	Binghamton Senators	AHL	80	4	19	23	108	2	0	0	0	2
2004–05	Binghamton Senators	AHL	75	2	13	15	103	6	0	2	2	25
2005–06	Krefeld Pinguine	DEL	52	12	22	34	100	5	0	2	2	6
2006–07	Binghamton Senators	AHL	56	6	21	27	84	—	—	—	—	—
2006–07	Hershey Bears	AHL	21	0	8	8	30	19	0	3	3	28
2007–08	DEG Metro Stars	DEL	55	12	23	35	142	13	2	5	7	28
2008–09	DEG Metro Stars	DEL	52	9	19	28	68	16	4	2	6	24
2009–10	Adler Mannheim	DEL	54	6	9	15	60	2	0	0	0	0
2010–11	DEG Metro Stars	DEL	52	11	16	27	68	9	2	2	4	10
2011–12	DEG Metro Stars	DEL	50	14	15	29	78	7	2	2	4	30
2012–13	EHC Black Wings Linz	EBEL	53	11	22	33	76	11	2	4	6	12
2013–14	EHC Black Wings Linz	EBEL	54	5	14	19	62	8	0	3	3	12
AHL totals			291	13	68	81	373	37	0	5	5	55
DEL totals			315	64	104	168	516	52	10	13	23	98
EBEL totals			107	16	36	52	138	19	2	7	9	24

== Awards ==
Award	Year
DEL All-Star Team	2007–08
DEL All-Star Team	2008–09
