= 2005–06 Toronto Maple Leafs season =

NHL hockey team season

2005–06 Toronto Maple Leafs
- Division: 4th Northeast
- Conference: 9th Eastern
- 2005–06 record: 41–33–8
- Home record: 26–12–3
- Road record: 15–21–5
- Goals for: 254
- Goals against: 263

Team information
- General manager: John Ferguson Jr.
- Coach: Pat Quinn
- Captain: Mats Sundin
- Alternate captains: Tomas Kaberle; Bryan McCabe
- Arena: Air Canada Centre
- Average attendance: 19,408
- Minor league affiliates: Toronto Marlies; Pensacola Ice Pilots

Team leaders
- Goals: Mats Sundin (31)
- Assists: Bryan McCabe (49)
- Points: Mats Sundin (78)
- Penalty minutes: Bryan McCabe (116)
- Plus/minus: Alexei Ponikarovsky (+15)
- Wins: Ed Belfour (22)
- Goals against average: Jean-Sebastien Aubin (2.21)

The 2005–06 Toronto Maple Leafs season was the 89th season of the franchise, 79th season as the Maple Leafs. This season marked the first time since the 1997–98 season that the team did not make the playoffs.

== Off season ==
Key dates prior to the start of the season:

- The 2005 NHL entry draft took place in Ottawa on July 30, 2005.
- The free agency period began on August 1.

== Regular season ==
- October 5, 2005 – The Toronto Maple Leafs and the Ottawa Senators participate in the first NHL shootout. Daniel Alfredsson of the Senators scores the first shootout goal in NHL history.
- October 14, 2005 – The Maple Leafs defeat the Atlanta Thrashers 9–1 at Philips Arena, scoring seven power-play goals on 16 opportunities (43.75%).
- December 19, 2005 – Ed Belfour passes Terry Sawchuk for second all-time in wins by a goaltender in a 9–6 Maple Leafs' victory over the New York Islanders. It was the highest-scoring game of 2005–06 regular-season.
- Six members of the Maple Leafs competed in Ice hockey at the 2006 Winter Olympics in Turin. Bryan McCabe represented Canada; Nik Antropov competed for Kazakhstan; Aki Berg competed for Finland; Tomas Kaberle for the Czech Republic; and Mats Sundin and Mikael Tellqvist captured the gold medal while representing Sweden. Sundin also held the distinction of serving as captain for Sweden.
- April 11, 2006 – Captain Mats Sundin scores four goals and adds two assists for six points in a 6–5 overtime win against the Florida Panthers at Air Canada Centre.

The Maple Leafs would go on to lead all 30 teams with most power-play goals scored during the regular season, with 107. Captain Mats Sundin, who scored only 13 goals in his first 49 games of the season, scored 18 goals in his final 21 games, for the 12th 30-goal season of his career. The 32-year-old veteran Eric Lindros, signed by the Maple Leafs on August 11, 2005, had a solid start to the season, scoring seven goals in his first eight games. However, wrist injuries would limit him to 33 games played for the year; he finished with 11 goals and 11 assists for 22 points. Tomas Kaberle, Bryan McCabe and Darcy Tucker would all have career years, finishing with 68, 67 and 61 points, respectively.

Defensively, the Maple Leafs finished 21st out of 30 in goaltending, allowing 263 goals (excluding seven shootout goals allowed). It was the most goals allowed by a Maple Leafs team since the 1996–97 squad allowed 273. Toronto finished 26th in power-play goals allowed, with 99 and 24th in penalty killing, with 80.04%. While goaltender Jean-Sebastien Aubin posted a 9–0–2 record with a .924 save percentage and a 2.22 goals against average (GAA), this was at the end of the season, and it proved too little too late to get the Leafs into the playoffs. Starter Ed Belfour finished with a .892 save percentage and a 3.29 GAA with one shutout, while Mikael Tellqvist posted a save percentage of 3.13, with a GAA of 3.13. Furthermore, for the first time since the 1988–89 season, Belfour did not record a shutout during the regular season.

The Maple Leafs finished the regular season with a 41–33–8 record for 90 points, two points behind the Tampa Bay Lightning, who captured the eighth spot in the Eastern Conference. Their ninth-place finish meant that the Maple Leafs would miss the playoffs for the first time since 1998. Throughout the season, Toronto struggled against their provincial and divisional rivals, the Ottawa Senators, winning only one game out of eight meetings with a 1–5–2 record. Excluding shootout goals, the Maple Leafs were outscored 39 to 19 and were shut-out twice. Goaltender Ed Belfour went 0–5–2 against the Senators with 34 goals allowed, a 5.20 GAA and a save percentage of .834.

=== Season standings ===
Northeast Division
No.	CR		GP	W	L	OTL	GF	GA	Pts
1	1	**Ottawa Senators**	82	52	21	9	314	211	113
2	4	**Buffalo Sabres**	82	52	24	6	281	239	110
3	7	**Montreal Canadiens**	82	42	31	9	243	247	93
4	9	Toronto Maple Leafs	82	41	33	8	257	270	90
5	13	Boston Bruins	82	29	37	16	230	266	74

Note: CR = Conference rank; GP = Games played; W = Wins; L = Losses; OTL = Overtime/Shootout loss; GF = Goals for; GA = Goals against; Pts = Points
Bolded teams qualified for the playoffs.

Eastern Conference
R		Div	GP	W	L	OTL	GF	GA	Pts
**1**	**Z-** Ottawa Senators	**NE**	**82**	**52**	**21**	**9**	**314**	**211**	113
**2**	**Y-** Carolina Hurricanes	**SE**	**82**	**52**	**22**	**8**	**294**	**260**	112
**3**	**Y-** New Jersey Devils	**AT**	**82**	**46**	**27**	**9**	**242**	**229**	101
**4**	**X-** Buffalo Sabres	**NE**	**82**	**52**	**24**	**6**	**242**	**239**	110
**5**	**X-** Philadelphia Flyers	**AT**	**82**	**45**	**26**	**11**	**267**	**259**	101
**6**	**X-** New York Rangers	**AT**	**82**	**44**	**26**	**12**	**257**	**215**	100
**7**	**X-** Montreal Canadiens	**NE**	**82**	**42**	**31**	**9**	**243**	**247**	93
**8**	**X-** Tampa Bay Lightning	**SE**	**82**	**43**	**33**	**6**	**252**	**260**	92
8.5
9	Toronto Maple Leafs	NE	82	41	33	8	257	270	90
10	Atlanta Thrashers	SE	82	41	33	8	281	275	90
11	Florida Panthers	SE	82	37	34	11	240	257	85
12	New York Islanders	AT	82	36	40	6	230	278	78
13	Boston Bruins	NE	82	29	37	16	230	266	74
14	Washington Capitals	SE	82	29	41	12	237	306	70
15	Pittsburgh Penguins	AT	82	22	46	14	244	316	58

Divisions: AT – Atlantic, NE – Northeast, SE – Southeast

Z – Clinched conference; Y – Clinched division; X – Clinched playoff spot

== Schedule and results ==
2005–06 regular season
October: 6–4–2 (home: 4–3–1; road: 2–1–1)

Game	Date	Score	Opponent	Record	Recap
1	October 5, 2005	2–3 SO	Ottawa Senators (2005–06)	0–0–1	OTL
2	October 8, 2005	4–5	Montreal Canadiens (2005–06)	0–1–1	L
3	October 10, 2005	5–6 SO	@ Ottawa Senators (2005–06)	0–1–2	OTL
4	October 11, 2005	4–2	Philadelphia Flyers (2005–06)	1–1–2	W
5	October 14, 2005	9–1	@ Atlanta Thrashers (2005–06)	2–1–2	W
6	October 15, 2005	3–2	@ Montreal Canadiens (2005–06)	3–1–2	W
7	October 20, 2005	5–4 OT	Carolina Hurricanes (2005–06)	4–1–2	W
8	October 22, 2005	2–5	Philadelphia Flyers (2005–06)	4–2–2	L
9	October 24, 2005	5–4 SO	Boston Bruins (2005–06)	5–2–2	W
10	October 27, 2005	1–2	@ Boston Bruins (2005–06)	5–3–2	L
11	October 29, 2005	0–8	Ottawa Senators (2005–06)	5–4–2	L
12	October 31, 2005	2–1	Florida Panthers (2005–06)	6–4–2	W

November: 8–5–1 (home: 5–1–0; road: 3–4–1)

Game	Date	Score	Opponent	Record	Recap
13	November 3, 2005	3–4	@ Carolina Hurricanes (2005–06)	6–5–2	L
14	November 5, 2005 †	5–3	Tampa Bay Lightning (2005–06)	7–5–2	W
15	November 6, 2005	4–5	@ Washington Capitals (2005–06)	7–6–2	L
16	November 8, 2005	6–4	Washington Capitals (2005–06)	8–6–2	W
17	November 11, 2005	2–5	@ Buffalo Sabres (2005–06)	8–7–2	L
18	November 12, 2005	5–4 OT	@ Montreal Canadiens (2005–06)	9–7–2	W
19	November 15, 2005	2–1	New York Rangers (2005–06)	10–7–2	W
20	November 17, 2005	4–1	@ Boston Bruins (2005–06)	11–7–2	W
21	November 19, 2005	5–1	Atlanta Thrashers (2005–06)	12–7–2	W
22	November 23, 2005	1–5	Boston Bruins (2005–06)	12–8–2	L
23	November 25, 2005	3–4 SO	@ Carolina Hurricanes (2005–06)	12–8–3	OTL
24	November 26, 2005	4–3 OT	Montreal Canadiens (2005–06)	13–8–3	W
25	November 28, 2005	2–1	@ Florida Panthers (2005–06)	14–8–3	W
26	November 30, 2005	1–2	@ Tampa Bay Lightning (2005–06)	14–9–3	L

December: 8–5–0 (home: 5–3–0; road: 3–2–0)

Game	Date	Score	Opponent	Record	Recap
27	December 1, 2005	4–0	@ Atlanta Thrashers (2005–06)	15–9–3	W
28	December 3, 2005	4–5	San Jose Sharks (2005–06)	15–10–3	L
29	December 6, 2005	1–2	Los Angeles Kings (2005–06)	15–11–3	L
30	December 10, 2005	1–2	Dallas Stars (2005–06)	15–12–3	L
31	December 12, 2005	3–2	Mighty Ducks of Anaheim (2005–06)	16–12–3	W
32	December 17, 2005	2–8	@ Ottawa Senators (2005–06)	16–13–3	L
33	December 19, 2005	9–6	New York Islanders (2005–06)	17–13–3	W
34	December 22, 2005	1–4	@ Boston Bruins (2005–06)	17–14–3	L
35	December 23, 2005	2–1	Boston Bruins (2005–06)	18–14–3	W
36	December 26, 2005	2–1	New Jersey Devils (2005–06)	19–14–3	W
37	December 27, 2005	3–2 OT	@ Pittsburgh Penguins (2005–06)	20–14–3	W
38	December 29, 2005	4–3 SO	Buffalo Sabres (2005–06)	21–14–3	W
39	December 31, 2005	6–3	@ New Jersey Devils (2005–06)	22–14–3	W

January: 3–8–2 (home: 1–2–1; road: 2–6–1)

Game	Date	Score	Opponent	Record	Recap
40	January 2, 2006	3–2 OT	Pittsburgh Penguins (2005–06)	23–14–3	W
41	January 6, 2006	0–1	@ Calgary Flames (2005–06)	23–15–3	L
42	January 7, 2006	3–2	@ Edmonton Oilers (2005–06)	24–15–3	W
43	January 10, 2006	3–4	@ Vancouver Canucks (2005–06)	24–16–3	L
44	January 14, 2006	3–4	Phoenix Coyotes (2005–06)	24–17–3	L
45	January 17, 2006	3–5	@ Colorado Avalanche (2005–06)	24–18–3	L
46	January 18, 2006	3–5	@ Minnesota Wild (2005–06)	24–19–3	L
47	January 21, 2006	0–7	@ Ottawa Senators (2005–06)	24–20–3	L
48	January 23, 2006	3–4	@ Ottawa Senators (2005–06)	24–21–3	L
49	January 26, 2006	4–8	Buffalo Sabres (2005–06)	24–22–3	L
50	January 28, 2006	3–4 OT	Montreal Canadiens (2005–06)	24–22–4	OTL
51	January 30, 2006	4–2	@ Florida Panthers (2005–06)	25–22–4	W
52	January 31, 2006	2–3 SO	@ Tampa Bay Lightning (2005–06)	25–22–5	OTL

February: 2–4–0 (home: 2–2–0; road: 0–2–0)

Game	Date	Score	Opponent	Record	Recap
53	February 3, 2006	1–4	@ Washington Capitals (2005–06)	25–23–5	L
54	February 4, 2006	4–2	New Jersey Devils (2005–06)	26–23–5	W
55	February 7, 2006	4–1	Atlanta Thrashers (2005–06)	27–23–5	W
56	February 10, 2006	2–4	@ New York Rangers (2005–06)	27–24–5	L
57	February 11, 2006	2–4	New York Rangers (2005–06)	27–25–5	L
58	February 28, 2006	3–5	Washington Capitals (2005–06)	27–26–5	L

March: 7–6–1 (home: 4–1–0; road: 3–5–1)

Game	Date	Score	Opponent	Record	Recap
59	March 3, 2006	2–6	@ Buffalo Sabres (2005–06)	27–27–5	L
60	March 4, 2006	2–4	Ottawa Senators (2005–06)	27–28–5	L
61	March 7, 2006	5–3	Montreal Canadiens (2005–06)	28–28–5	W
62	March 10, 2006	1–2 SO	@ New York Islanders (2005–06)	28–28–6	OTL
63	March 11, 2006	5–1	Tampa Bay Lightning (2005–06)	29–28–6	W
64	March 14, 2006	5–4 SO	Boston Bruins (2005–06)	30–28–6	W
65	March 16, 2006	1–3	@ Buffalo Sabres (2005–06)	30–29–6	L
66	March 18, 2006	2–5	@ New York Rangers (2005–06)	30–30–6	L
67	March 19, 2006	1–0	@ Pittsburgh Penguins (2005–06)	31–30–6	W
68	March 21, 2006	3–2	Carolina Hurricanes (2005–06)	32–30–6	W
69	March 23, 2006	1–5	@ Montreal Canadiens (2005–06)	32–31–6	L
70	March 25, 2006	2–6	@ Montreal Canadiens (2005–06)	32–32–6	L
71	March 26, 2006	4–3	@ New Jersey Devils (2005–06)	33–32–6	W
72	March 28, 2006	3–2	@ Philadelphia Flyers (2005–06)	34–32–6	W

April: 7–1–2 (home: 5–0–1; road: 2–1–1)

Game	Date	Score	Opponent	Record	Recap
73	April 1, 2006	7–0	Buffalo Sabres (2005–06)	35–32–6	W
74	April 3, 2006	2–3 SO	Buffalo Sabres (2005–06)	35–32–7	OTL
75	April 5, 2006	3–2	New York Islanders (2005–06)	36–32–7	W
76	April 6, 2006	2–3 SO	@ Boston Bruins (2005–06)	36–32–8	OTL
77	April 8, 2006	5–2	@ Philadelphia Flyers (2005–06)	37–32–8	W
78	April 11, 2006	6–5 OT	Florida Panthers (2005–06)	38–32–8	W
79	April 13, 2006	4–3 OT	@ New York Islanders (2005–06)	39–32–8	W
80	April 15, 2006	5–1	Ottawa Senators (2005–06)	40–32–8	W
81	April 16, 2006	0–6	@ Buffalo Sabres (2005–06)	40–33–8	L
82	April 18, 2006	5–3	Pittsburgh Penguins (2005–06)	41–33–8	W

Legend: W Win (2 points) L Loss (0 points) OTL Overtime/shootout loss (1 point)

- † Hockey Hall of Fame Game

== Player statistics ==
=== Scoring ===
- Position abbreviations: C = Centre; D = Defence; G = Goaltender; LW = Left wing; RW = Right wing
- † = Joined team via a transaction (e.g., trade, waivers, signing) during the season. Stats reflect time with the Maple Leafs only.
- ‡ = Left team via a transaction (e.g., trade, waivers, release) during the season. Stats reflect time with the Maple Leafs only.

No.	Player	Pos	Regular season					
No.	Player	Pos	GP	G	A	Pts	+/-	PIM
13	Mats Sundin	C	70	31	47	78	7	58
24	Bryan McCabe	D	73	19	49	68	−1	116
15	Tomas Kaberle	D	82	9	58	67	−1	46
16	Darcy Tucker	C	74	28	33	61	−12	100
41	Jason Allison	C	66	17	43	60	−18	76
10	Alexander Steen	C	75	18	27	45	−9	42
42	Kyle Wellwood	C	81	11	34	45	0	14
23	Alexei Ponikarovsky	LW	81	21	17	38	15	68
92	Jeff O'Neill	RW	74	19	19	38	−19	64
80	Nik Antropov	RW	57	12	19	31	13	56
18	Chad Kilger	C	79	17	11	28	−6	63
14	Matt Stajan	C	80	15	12	27	5	50
88	Eric Lindros	C	33	11	11	22	−3	43
28	Tie Domi	RW	77	5	11	16	−10	109
22	Ken Klee‡	D	56	3	12	15	−1	66
25	Alexander Khavanov	D	64	6	6	12	−11	60
39	Clarke Wilm	C	60	1	7	8	−15	43
8	Aki Berg	D	75	0	8	8	−5	56
45	Carlo Colaiacovo	D	21	2	5	7	0	17
37	Ian White	D	12	1	5	6	2	10
21	Mariusz Czerkawski‡	RW	19	4	1	5	−2	6
53	John Pohl	RW	7	3	1	4	2	4
3	Wade Belak	D	55	0	3	3	−13	109
22	Luke Richardson†	D	21	0	3	3	−1	41
48	Jeremy Williams	C	1	1	0	1	0	0
20	Ed Belfour	G	49	0	1	1		12
43	Jay Harrison	D	8	0	1	1	5	2
44	Staffan Kronwall	D	34	0	1	1	−3	14
56	Andy Wozniewski	D	13	0	1	1	−8	13
30	Jean-Sebastien Aubin	G	11	0	0	0		0
36	Brendan Bell	D	1	0	0	0	0	0
46	Ben Ondrus	LW	22	0	0	0	−10	18
26	Nathan Perrott‡	RW	3	0	0	0	−5	2
19	Aleksander Suglobov†	RW	2	0	0	0	−1	0
32	Mikael Tellqvist	G	25	0	0	0		0

=== Goaltending ===
No.	Player	Regular season									
No.	Player	GP	W	L	OT	SA	GA	GAA	SV%	SO	TOI
20	Ed Belfour	49	22	22	4	1476	159	3.29	.892	0	2897
32	Mikael Tellqvist	25	10	11	2	697	73	3.13	.895	2	1399
30	Jean-Sebastien Aubin	11	9	0	2	330	25	2.22	.924	1	677

== Awards and records ==
=== Awards ===
Type	Award/honour	Recipient	Ref
League (in-season)	NHL Defensive Player of the Week	Bryan McCabe (October 17)	
League (in-season)	NHL Offensive Player of the Week	Bryan McCabe (November 21)	
Team	Molson Cup	Mats Sundin	

=== Milestones ===
Ed Belfour passed Terry Sawchuk for second on the all-time wins list on December 19, 2005.

Milestone	Player	Date	Ref
First game	Alexander Steen	October 5, 2005	
First game	Andy Wozniewski	October 5, 2005	
First game	Staffan Kronwall	October 29, 2005	
First game	Jay Harrison	January 28, 2006	
First game	Ben Ondrus	March 7, 2006	
First game	Brendan Bell	March 21, 2006	
First game	Ian White	March 26, 2006	
First game	Jeremy Williams	April 18, 2006	
1,000th game played	Tie Domi	March 3, 2006	

== Transactions ==
The Maple Leafs were involved in the following transactions from February 17, 2005, the day after the 2004–05 NHL season was officially cancelled, through June 19, 2006, the day of the deciding game of the 2006 Stanley Cup Finals.

=== Trades ===
Date	Details		Ref
July 30, 2005	To Carolina Hurricanes: Conditional 4th-round pick in 2006	To Toronto Maple Leafs: Jeff O'Neill	
August 24, 2005	To St. Louis Blues: Future considerations	To Toronto Maple Leafs: John Pohl	
November 6, 2005	To Dallas Stars: Nathan Perrott	To Toronto Maple Leafs: Conditional 6th-round pick in 2006 (Note: Toronto would have received a 2006 5th-round pick if Perrott played in more than half of Dallas’ remaining games.)	
March 8, 2006	To Columbus Blue Jackets: Conditional draft pick (Note: Either Toronto’s 5th-round pick in 2006 or 4th-round pick in 2007. Columbus received the 2006 pick.)	To Toronto Maple Leafs: Luke Richardson	
March 8, 2006	To New Jersey Devils: Ken Klee	To Toronto Maple Leafs: Aleksander Suglobov	
June 15, 2006	To Boston Bruins: Rights to Petr Tenkrat	To Toronto Maple Leafs: 7th-round pick in 2006	

=== Players acquired ===
Date	Player	Former team	Term	Via	Ref
August 5, 2005	Jason Allison	Los Angeles Kings	1-year	Free agency	
August 10, 2005	Alexander Khavanov	St. Louis Blues	1-year	Free agency	
August 11, 2005	Eric Lindros	New York Rangers	1-year	Free agency	
August 12, 2005	Mike Hoffman	Cleveland Barons (AHL)	1-year	Free agency	
August 18, 2005	Jean-Sebastien Aubin	St. John's Maple Leafs (AHL)	1-year	Free agency	
September 9, 2005	Mariusz Czerkawski	Djurgardens IF (SHL)	1-year	Free agency	
September 10, 2005	Brad Brown	Buffalo Sabres	1-year	Free agency	
March 8, 2006	Alex Foster	Bowling Green State University (CCHA)		Free agency	
April 18, 2006	Chris Harrington	University of Minnesota (WCHA)		Free agency	

=== Players lost ===
Date	Player	New team	Via (Note: In parentheses is the player's free agency group on August 1 if applicable.)	Ref
August 1, 2005	Joe Nieuwendyk	Florida Panthers	Free agency (III)	
August 1, 2005	Owen Nolan (Note: Nolan was inactive during the 2005–06 season.)		Release	
August 1, 2005	Gary Roberts	Florida Panthers	Free agency (III)	
August 3, 2005	Brian Leetch	Boston Bruins	Free agency (III)	
August 15, 2005	Jason MacDonald	Boston Bruins	Free agency	
August 16, 2005	Alexander Mogilny	New Jersey Devils	Free agency (III)	
August 23, 2005	Harold Druken	EHC Basel (NLA)	Free agency (UFA)	
September 21, 2005	Regan Kelly	Sheffield Steelers (EIHL)	Free agency (UFA)	
September 22, 2005	Nathan Barrett	Norfolk Admirals (AHL)	Free agency (UFA)	
January 25, 2006	Karel Pilar	HC Sparta Praha (ELH)	Free agency (II) (Note: Toronto retained Pilar’s NHL rights through the 2006–07 season.)	
March 8, 2006	Mariusz Czerkawski	Boston Bruins	Waivers	
April 26, 2006	Aki Berg	HC TPS (Liiga)	Free agency	

=== Signings ===
Date	Player	Term	Contract type	Ref
July 28, 2005	John Mitchell	multi-year	Entry-level	
July 30, 2005	Jeff O'Neill	multi-year	Re-signing	
August 5, 2005	Tie Domi	2-year	Re-signing	
August 9, 2005	Staffan Kronwall	multi-year	Entry-level	
August 9, 2005	Alexander Steen	multi-year	Entry-level	
August 10, 2005	Wade Belak	2-year	Re-signing	
August 10, 2005	Aki Berg	1-year	Re-signing	
August 12, 2005	Nik Antropov	1-year	Re-signing	
August 12, 2005	Roman Kukumberg	1-year	Entry-level	
August 12, 2005	Clarke Wilm	1-year	Re-signing	
September 7, 2005	Alexei Ponikarovsky	2-year	Re-signing	
September 21, 2005	Nathan Perrott		Re-signing	
December 19, 2005	Justin Pogge	3-year	Entry-level	
February 11, 2006	Tomas Kaberle	5-year	Extension	
April 12, 2006	Jean-Sebastien Aubin	1-year	Re-signing	
April 15, 2006	Robbie Earl	3-year	Entry-level	
April 17, 2006	Chad Kilger	3-year	Re-signing	
June 8, 2006	Mikael Tellqvist	1-year	Option exercised	

== Draft picks ==
The 2005 NHL entry draft was the 43rd NHL entry draft. As a lockout cancelled the 2004–05 NHL season, the draft order was determined by lottery on July 22, 2005. Teams were assigned 1 to 3 balls based on their playoff appearances and first overall draft picks from the past three years. According to the draft order, the selection worked its way up to 30 as usual; then instead of repeating the order as in past years, the draft "snaked" back down to the team with the first pick. Therefore, the team with the first pick overall would not pick again until the 60th pick. The team with the 30th pick would also get the 31st pick. The draft was only seven rounds in length, compared to nine rounds in years past. The labor dispute caused the shortened draft.

- Toronto's picks at the 2005 NHL entry draft in Ottawa, Ontario.

Round	#	Player	Position	Nationality	College/Junior/Club team (League)
1	21	Tuukka Rask	Goaltender	Finland	Ilves Jr. (Finland)
3	82	Phil Oreskovic	Defence	Canada	Brampton Battalion (OHL)
5	153	Alex Berry	Right wing	United States	Bruins Jr. (EJHL)
6	173	Johan Dahlberg	Left wing	Sweden	Modo Hockey Jr. (Sweden)
7	216	Anton Stralman	Defence	Sweden	Skovde (Sweden 2)
7	228	Chad Rau	Centre	United States	Des Moines Buccaneers (USHL)

== Farm teams ==
=== American Hockey League ===
- The Maple Leafs farm club was the Toronto Marlies. In their first season, the Marlies had 41 wins, 29 losses, and posted 92 points for the season. The club finished in fourth place in the North Division. In the playoffs, the Marlies lost in the first round 4 games to 1 to Grand Rapids. Marc Moro was the team captain and Paul Maurice was the head coach.

The Maple Leafs were also affiliated with the Pensacola Ice Pilots of the ECHL.

== See also ==
- 2005–06 NHL season
