= 2006–07 Toronto Maple Leafs season =

NHL hockey team season

2006–07 Toronto Maple Leafs
- Division: 3rd Northeast
- Conference: 9th Eastern
- 2006–07 record: 40–31–11
- Home record: 21–15–5
- Road record: 19–16–6
- Goals for: 258
- Goals against: 269

Team information
- General manager: John Ferguson Jr.
- Coach: Paul Maurice
- Captain: Mats Sundin
- Alternate captains: Tomas Kaberle; Bryan McCabe
- Arena: Air Canada Centre
- Minor league affiliates: Toronto Marlies; Columbia Inferno

Team leaders
- Goals: Mats Sundin (27)
- Assists: Mats Sundin (49)
- Points: Mats Sundin (76)
- Penalty minutes: Bryan McCabe (115)
- Plus/minus: Hal Gill (+11)
- Wins: Andrew Raycroft (37)
- Goals against average: Mikael Tellqvist (2.03)

The 2006–07 NHL season saw the Toronto Maple Leafs attempting to recover from a 2005–06 season in which it finished two points out of the final playoff spot in the Eastern Conference. The team missed the playoffs for the second year in a row for the first time since the 1996–97 and 1997–98 seasons.

== Offseason ==
Head coach Pat Quinn was fired on April 20. Paul Maurice was named his replacement on May 12.

Michael Peca was a major addition to the team for 2006–07, signed from the defending Western Conference champion Edmonton Oilers. However, Peca suffered a broken leg in December after scoring just 4 goals in 35 games.

Goaltender Andrew Raycroft was acquired in a trade from the Boston Bruins to take over the starting job vacancy created by Ed Belfour's departure to the Florida Panthers.

== Regular season ==
On January 4, 2007, the Maple Leafs defeated the Boston Bruins 10–2 away. Alexander Steen scored a hat-trick in the victory. It was the first time that an NHL team had scored ten goals in a regular season game since January 14, 2006, when the Buffalo Sabres defeated the Los Angeles Kings 10–1 at home. It was also the first time that the Maple Leafs had scored ten goals in a regular season game since November 12, 1998, when they defeated the Chicago Blackhawks 10–3 away.

Although they finished in third place in the Northeast Division, the Maple Leafs ultimately failed to qualify for the playoffs after the New York Islanders clinched the eighth and final playoff spot after a 3–2 victory in a shootout to the New Jersey Devils, finishing just one point out of the final playoff spot in the Eastern Conference.

The Maple Leafs tied the Dallas Stars for fewest shorthanded goals scored during the regular season with three.

=== Season standings ===
Northeast Division
No.	CR		GP	W	L	OTL	GF	GA	Pts
1	1	**Buffalo Sabres**	82	53	22	7	308	242	113
2	4	**Ottawa Senators**	82	48	25	9	288	222	105
3	9	Toronto Maple Leafs	82	40	31	11	258	269	91
4	10	Montreal Canadiens	82	42	34	6	245	256	90
5	13	Boston Bruins	82	35	41	6	219	289	76

Note: No. = Division rank, CR = Conference rank, W = Wins, L = Losses, T = Ties, GF = Goals For, GA = Goals Against, Pts = Points
Teams that qualified for the playoffs are highlighted in bold.

Eastern Conference
R		Div	GP	W	L	OTL	GF	GA	Pts
**1**	**P -** Buffalo Sabres	**NE**	**82**	**53**	**22**	**7**	**308**	**242**	113
**2**	**Y -** New Jersey Devils	**AT**	**82**	**49**	**24**	**9**	**216**	**201**	107
**3**	**Y -** Atlanta Thrashers	**SE**	**82**	**43**	**28**	**11**	**246**	**245**	97
**4**	**X -** Ottawa Senators	**NE**	**82**	**48**	**25**	**9**	**288**	**222**	105
**5**	**X -** Pittsburgh Penguins	**AT**	**82**	**47**	**24**	**11**	**277**	**246**	105
**6**	**X -** New York Rangers	**AT**	**82**	**42**	**30**	**10**	**242**	**216**	94
**7**	**X -** Tampa Bay Lightning	**SE**	**82**	**44**	**33**	**5**	**253**	**261**	93
**8**	**X -** New York Islanders	**AT**	**82**	**40**	**30**	**12**	**248**	**240**	92
8.5
9	Toronto Maple Leafs	NE	82	40	31	11	258	269	91
10	Montreal Canadiens	NE	82	42	34	6	245	256	90
11	Carolina Hurricanes	SE	82	40	34	8	241	253	88
12	Florida Panthers	SE	82	35	31	16	247	257	86
13	Boston Bruins	NE	82	35	41	6	219	289	76
14	Washington Capitals	SE	82	28	40	14	235	286	70
15	Philadelphia Flyers	AT	82	22	48	12	214	303	56

Divisions: AT – Atlantic, NE – Northeast, SE – Southeast

P – Clinched Presidents Trophy; Y – Clinched division; X – Clinched playoff spot

== Schedule and results ==
2006–07 regular season
October: 6–4–3 (home: 3–3–2; road: 3–1–1)

Game	Date	Visitor	Score	Home	OT	Decision	Attendance	Record	Points	Recap
1	October 4	Ottawa	4–1	Toronto		Raycroft	19,520	0–1–0	0	L
2	October 5	Toronto	6–0	Ottawa		Raycroft	19,237	1–1–0	2	W
3	October 7	Montreal	3–2	Toronto	SO	Raycroft	19,353	1–1–1	3	OTL
4	October 9	Florida	1–2	Toronto	SO	Raycroft	19,102	2–1–1	5	W
5	October 12	Toronto	6–7	New Jersey	SO	Aubin	15,623	2–1–2	6	OTL
6	October 14	Calgary	4–5	Toronto	OT	Raycroft	19,338	3–1–2	8	W
7	October 18	Colorado	4–1	Toronto		Raycroft	19,463	3–2–2	8	L
8	October 20	Toronto	4–2	Columbus		Raycroft	17,303	4–2–2	10	W
9	October 21	NY Rangers	5–4	Toronto	SO	Raycroft	19,419	4–2–3	11	OTL
10	October 24	Ottawa	6–2	Toronto		Raycroft	19,485	4–3–3	11	L
11	October 26	Toronto	2–7	Ottawa		Raycroft	19,178	4–4–3	11	L
12	October 28	Toronto	5–4	Montreal	SO	Aubin	21,273	5–4–3	13	W
13	October 30	Atlanta	2–4	Toronto		Raycroft	19,285	6–4–3	15	W

November: 7–6–1 (home: 3–3–0; road: 4–3–1)

Game	Date	Visitor	Score	Home	OT	Decision	Attendance	Record	Points	Recap
14	November 1	Toronto	4–2	Tampa Bay		Raycroft	19,977	7–4–3	17	W
15	November 2	Toronto	2–4	Florida		Aubin	13,233	7–5–3	17	L
16	November 4	Toronto	4–1	Buffalo		Raycroft	18,690	8–5–3	19	W
17	November 6	Philadelphia	1–4	Toronto		Raycroft	19,501	9–5–3	21	W
18	November 9	Toronto	6–4	Boston		Raycroft	14,835	10–5–3	23	W
19	November 11 †	Montreal	1–5	Toronto		Aubin	19,501	11–5–3	25	W
20	November 16	Toronto	1–2	Boston	SO	Aubin	12,665	11–5–4	26	OTL
21	November 18	New Jersey	2–1	Toronto		Tellqvist	19,409	11–6–4	26	L
22	November 20	NY Islanders	2–4	Toronto		Raycroft	19,392	12–6–4	28	W
23	November 22	Toronto	4–7	Buffalo		Raycroft	18,690	12–7–4	28	L
24	November 24	Toronto	7–1	Washington		Raycroft	14,892	13–7–4	30	W
25	November 25	Boston	3–1	Toronto		Raycroft	19,473	13–8–4	30	L
26	November 28	Boston	4–1	Toronto		Raycroft	19,469	13–9–4	30	L
27	November 30	Toronto	0–5	Atlanta		Raycroft	15,092	13–10–4	30	L

December: 4–7–2 (home: 3–3–1; road: 1–4–1)

Game	Date	Visitor	Score	Home	OT	Decision	Attendance	Record	Points	Recap
28	December 2	Toronto	3–4	Montreal	SO	Raycroft	21,273	13–10–5	31	OTL
29	December 5	Atlanta	5–2	Toronto		Raycroft	19,507	13–11–5	31	L
30	December 7	Toronto	1–3	Boston		Aubin	13,407	13–12–5	31	L
31	December 9	Toronto	1–5	Detroit		Raycroft	20,066	13–13–5	31	L
32	December 12	Tampa Bay	4–5	Toronto		Raycroft	19,462	14–13–5	33	W
33	December 15	Toronto	4–3	Carolina		Raycroft	18,639	15–13–5	35	W
34	December 16	NY Rangers	2–9	Toronto		Raycroft	19,468	16–13–5	37	W
35	December 19	Florida	7–3	Toronto		Raycroft	19,444	16–14–5	37	L
36	December 22	Toronto	1–3	Chicago		Aubin	17,950	16–15–5	37	L
37	December 23	Washington	3–2	Toronto		Raycroft	19,488	16–16–5	37	L
38	December 26	Minnesota	3–4	Toronto		Raycroft	19,355	17–16–5	39	W
39	December 29	Toronto	1–4	Pittsburgh		Aubin	17,132	17–17–5	39	L
40	December 30	Ottawa	3–2	Toronto	OT	Raycroft	19,483	17–17–6	40	OTL

January: 8–4–0 (home: 2–3–0; road: 6–1–0)

Game	Date	Visitor	Score	Home	OT	Decision	Attendance	Record	Points	Recap
41	January 1	Boston	1–5	Toronto		Raycroft	19,359	18–17–6	42	W
42	January 4	Toronto	10–2	Boston		Raycroft	14,560	19–17–6	44	W
43	January 6	Buffalo	4–3	Toronto		Raycroft	19,487	19–18–6	44	L
44	January 9	Carolina	4–1	Toronto		Raycroft	19,447	19–19–6	44	L
45	January 11	Toronto	4–2	Buffalo		Raycroft	18,690	20–19–6	46	W
46	January 13	Vancouver	6–1	Toronto		Raycroft	19,608	20–20–6	46	L
47	January 16	Toronto	4–2	Tampa Bay		Raycroft	19,830	21–20–6	48	W
48	January 18	Toronto	3–2	Florida		Raycroft	12,242	22–20–6	50	W
49	January 20	Toronto	2–8	Pittsburgh		Raycroft	17,132	22–21–6	50	L
50	January 27	Montreal	1–4	Toronto		Raycroft	17,132	23–21–6	52	W
51	January 30	Toronto	4–1	Carolina		Raycroft	16,533	24–21–6	54	W
52	January 31	Toronto	2–1	NY Rangers		Raycroft	18,200	25–21–6	56	W

February: 5–4–3 (home: 1–2–2; road: 4–2–1)

Game	Date	Visitor	Score	Home	OT	Decision	Attendance	Record	Points	Recap
53	February 3	Toronto	3–2	Ottawa	SO	Raycroft	20,112	26–21–6	58	W
54	February 6	Toronto	2–1	St. Louis		Raycroft	9,533	27–21–6	60	W
55	February 8	Toronto	2–4	Nashville		Raycroft	15,018	27–22–6	60	L
56	February 10	Pittsburgh	6–5	Toronto	OT	Raycroft	19,620	27–22–7	61	OTL
57	February 13	NY Islanders	3–2	Toronto	SO	Raycroft	19,600	27–22–8	62	OTL
58	February 15	Toronto	4–2	Philadelphia		Raycroft	19,321	28–22–8	64	W
59	February 17	Edmonton	3–4	Toronto		Raycroft	19,599	29–22–8	66	W
60	February 20	Boston	3–0	Toronto		Raycroft	19,578	29–23–8	66	L
61	February 22	Toronto	2–3	NY Islanders	SO	Raycroft	11,759	29–23–9	67	OTL
62	February 24	Toronto	5–2	Philadelphia		Raycroft	19,277	30–23–9	69	W
63	February 26	Toronto	4–5	Montreal		Raycroft	21,273	30–24–9	69	L
64	February 27	Buffalo	6–1	Toronto		Raycroft	19,588	30–25–9	69	L

March: 8–4–2 (home: 7–1–0; road: 1–3–2)

Game	Date	Visitor	Score	Home	OT	Decision	Attendance	Record	Points	Recap
65	March 2	Toronto	4–3	New Jersey	SO	Raycroft	15,095	31–25–9	71	W
66	March 3	Buffalo	3–1	Toronto		Aubin	19,588	31–26–9	71	L
67	March 6	Washington	0–3	Toronto		Raycroft	19,531	32–26–9	73	W
68	March 8	Toronto	1–5	Ottawa		Raycroft	20,018	32–27–9	73	L
69	March 10	Ottawa	3–4	Toronto	OT	Raycroft	19,527	33–27–9	75	W
70	March 13	Tampa Bay	2–3	Toronto		Raycroft	19,530	34–27–9	77	W
71	March 16	Toronto	1–5	Washington		Raycroft	16,281	34–28–9	77	L
72	March 17	Toronto	2–3	Montreal	SO	Raycroft	21,273	34–28–10	78	OTL
73	March 20	New Jersey	1–2	Toronto		Raycroft	19,518	35–28–10	80	W
74	March 23	Toronto	4–5	Buffalo		Raycroft	18,690	35–29–10	80	L
75	March 24	Buffalo	1–4	Toronto		Raycroft	19,571	36–29–10	82	W
76	March 27	Carolina	1–6	Toronto		Raycroft	19,559	37–29–10	84	W
77	March 29	Toronto	2–3	Atlanta	OT	Raycroft	17,062	37–29–11	85	OTL
78	March 31	Pittsburgh	4–5	Toronto	OT	Raycroft	19,649	38–29–11	87	W

April: 2–2–0 (home: 2–0–0; road: 0–2–0)

Game	Date	Visitor	Score	Home	OT	Decision	Attendance	Record	Points	Recap
79	April 1	Toronto	2–7	NY Rangers		Raycroft	18,200	38–30–11	87	L
80	April 3	Philadelphia	2–3	Toronto	OT	Raycroft	19,547	39–30–11	89	W
81	April 5	Toronto	2–5	NY Islanders		Raycroft	14,352	39–31–11	89	L
82	April 7	Montreal	5–6	Toronto		Aubin	19,723	40–31–11	91	W

Legend: W Win (2 points) L Loss (0 points) OTL Overtime/shootout loss (1 point)

- † Hockey Hall of Fame Game

== Player statistics ==
=== Scoring ===
- Position abbreviations: C = Centre; D = Defence; G = Goaltender; LW = Left wing; RW = Right wing
- † = Joined team via a transaction (e.g., trade, waivers, signing) during the season. Stats reflect time with the Maple Leafs only.
- ‡ = Left team via a transaction (e.g., trade, waivers, release) during the season. Stats reflect time with the Maple Leafs only.

No.	Player	Pos	Regular season					
No.	Player	Pos	GP	G	A	Pts	+/-	PIM
13	Mats Sundin	C	75	27	49	76	−2	62
15	Tomas Kaberle	D	74	11	47	58	3	20
24	Bryan McCabe	D	82	15	42	57	3	115
23	Alexei Ponikarovsky	LW	71	21	24	45	8	63
16	Darcy Tucker	RW	56	24	19	43	−11	81
92	Jeff O'Neill	RW	74	20	22	42	1	54
42	Kyle Wellwood	C	48	12	30	42	3	0
14	Matt Stajan	C	82	10	29	39	3	44
10	Alexander Steen	C	82	15	20	35	5	26
80	Nik Antropov	C	54	18	15	33	8	44
33	Bates Battaglia	LW	82	12	19	31	9	45
21	John Pohl	C	74	13	16	29	−4	10
18	Chad Kilger	LW	82	14	14	28	−5	58
7	Ian White	D	76	3	23	26	8	40
31 (Note: Kubina wore number 73 in his first nine games.)	Pavel Kubina	D	61	7	14	21	7	48
25	Hal Gill	D	82	6	14	20	11	91
22	Boyd Devereaux†	C	33	8	11	19	4	12
8	Carlo Colaiacovo	D	48	8	9	17	5	22
27	Michael Peca	C	35	4	11	15	2	60
94	Yanic Perreault†	C	17	2	3	5	1	4
36	Brendan Bell‡	D	31	1	4	5	−3	19
54	Kris Newbury	C	15	2	2	4	4	26
3	Wade Belak	D	65	0	3	3	−8	110
26	Ben Ondrus	RW	16	0	2	2	−5	20
56	Andy Wozniewski	D	15	0	2	2	−1	14
48	Jeremy Williams	C	1	1	0	1	1	0
1	Andrew Raycroft	G	72	0	1	1		8
30	Jean-Sebastien Aubin	G	20	0	0	0		0
39	Travis Green†	C	24	0	0	0	1	21
43	Jay Harrison	D	5	0	0	0	−5	6
9	Aleksander Suglobov	RW	14	0	0	0	−6	4
32	Mikael Tellqvist‡	G	1	0	0	0		0
39	Erik Westrum	C	2	0	0	0	0	0

=== Goaltending ===
- ‡ = Left team via a transaction (e.g., trade, waivers, release) during the season. Stats reflect time with the Maple Leafs only.

No.	Player	Regular season									
No.	Player	GP	W	L	OT	SA	GA	GAA	SV%	SO	TOI
1	Andrew Raycroft	72	37	25	9	1931	205	2.99	.894	2	4108
30	Jean-Sebastien Aubin	20	3	5	2	371	46	3.43	.876	0	804
32	Mikael Tellqvist‡	1	0	1	0	19	2	2.03	.895	0	59

== Awards and records ==
=== Awards ===
Type	Award/honour	Recipient	Ref
League (in-season)	NHL All-Star Game selection	Tomas Kaberle	
League (in-season)	NHL First Star of the Week	Andrew Raycroft (February 4)	
League (in-season)	NHL Second Star of the Week	Andrew Raycroft (November 5)	
League (in-season)	NHL Third Star of the Week	Mats Sundin (October 15)	
League (in-season)	NHL YoungStars Game selection	Alexander Steen	
Team	Molson Cup	Mats Sundin	

=== Milestones ===
Milestone	Player	Date	Ref
First game	Kris Newbury	December 23, 2006	

== Transactions ==
The Maple Leafs were involved in the following transactions from June 20, 2006, the day after the deciding game of the 2006 Stanley Cup Finals, through June 6, 2007, the day of the deciding game of the 2007 Stanley Cup Finals.

=== Trades ===
Date	Details		Ref
June 24, 2006	To Boston Bruins: Rights to Tuukka Rask	To Toronto Maple Leafs: Andrew Raycroft	
June 24, 2006	To Chicago Blackhawks: 3rd-round pick in 2006	To Toronto Maple Leafs: Columbus' 4th-round pick in 2006; Colorado's 4th-round pick in 2006	
June 24, 2006	To Phoenix Coyotes: Boston's 7th-round pick in 2006; 7th-round pick in 2006	To Toronto Maple Leafs: 6th-round pick in 2006	
November 28, 2006	To Phoenix Coyotes: Mikael Tellqvist	To Toronto Maple Leafs: Tyson Nash; 4th-round pick in 2007	
February 27, 2007	To Phoenix Coyotes: Brendan Bell; 2nd-round pick in 2007	To Toronto Maple Leafs: Yanic Perreault; 5th-round pick in 2007	

=== Players acquired ===
Date	Player	Former team	Term	Via	Ref
July 1, 2006	Hal Gill	Boston Bruins	3-year	Free agency	
July 1, 2006	Pavel Kubina	Tampa Bay Lightning	4-year	Free agency	
July 2, 2006	Bates Battaglia	Toronto Marlies (AHL)	1-year	Free agency	
July 13, 2006	Erik Westrum	Minnesota Wild	2-year	Free agency	
July 18, 2006	Michael Peca	Edmonton Oilers	1-year	Free agency	
July 28, 2006	Jaime Sifers	Toronto Marlies (AHL)	2-year	Free agency	
September 15, 2006	Brent Aubin	Quebec Remparts (QMJHL)		Free agency	
October 6, 2006	Boyd Devereaux	Phoenix Coyotes	1-year	Free agency	
January 10, 2007	Travis Green	Anaheim Ducks		Waivers	
March 20, 2007	Reid Cashman	Quinnipiac University (ECAC)	1-year	Free agency	

=== Players lost ===
Date	Player	New team	Via (Note: In parentheses is the player's free agency group on July 1 if applicable.)	Ref
June 28, 2006	Roman Kukumberg	HC Neftekhimik Nizhnekamsk (RSL)	Free agency (II) (Note: Toronto retained Kukumberg's NHL rights through the 2007–08 season.)	
June 30, 2006	Tie Domi (Note: Domi retired on September 19.)		Buyout	
July 1, 2006	Jason Allison (Note: Allison was inactive during the 2006–07 season.)		Contract expiration (III)	
July 11, 2006	Luke Richardson	Tampa Bay Lightning	Free agency (III)	
July 17, 2006	Eric Lindros	Dallas Stars	Free agency (III)	
July 25, 2006	Ed Belfour	Florida Panthers	Free agency (III)	
August 5, 2006	David Turon	HC Orli (ELH)	Free agency (UFA)	
September 17, 2006	Alexander Khavanov	HC Davos (NLA)	Free agency (III)	
October 25, 2006	Mike Hoffman	Manchester Monarchs (AHL)	Free agency (UFA)	
October 26, 2006	Clarke Wilm	Jokerit (Liiga)	Free agency (III)	
May 21, 2007	Aleksander Suglobov	SKA Saint Petersburg (RSL)	Free agency	

=== Signings ===
Date	Player	Term	Contract type	Ref
June 28, 2006	John Pohl	2-year	Re-signing	
June 29, 2006	Bryan McCabe	5-year	Re-signing	
July 4, 2006	Andrew Raycroft	3-year	Re-signing	
July 7, 2006	Ben Ondrus	2-year	Re-signing	
July 11, 2006	Nik Antropov	1-year	Re-signing	
July 14, 2006	Jiri Tlusty	3-year	Entry-level	
July 17, 2006	Brendan Bell	1-year	Re-signing	
July 17, 2006	Carlo Colaiacovo	1-year	Re-signing	
July 17, 2006	Jay Harrison	1-year	Re-signing	
July 17, 2006	Kris Newbury	1-year	Re-signing	
July 17, 2006	Kyle Wellwood	2-year	Re-signing	
July 26, 2006	Wade Belak	1-year	Extension	
August 25, 2006	Brad Leeb		Re-signing	
September 14, 2006	Matt Stajan	2-year	Re-signing	
November 10, 2006	Andy Wozniewski	1-year	Extension	
February 27, 2007	Darcy Tucker	4-year	Extension	
March 22, 2007	Kris Newbury	2-year	Extension	
April 26, 2007	Boyd Devereaux	2-year	Extension	
May 8, 2007	Ian White	3-year	Extension	
May 10, 2007	Alexei Ponikarovsky	3-year	Extension	
May 16, 2007	Anton Stralman	3-year	Entry-level	
May 24, 2007	Nikolay Kulemin	3-year	Entry-level	
June 1, 2007	Phil Oreskovic	3-year	Entry-level	
June 6, 2007	Nik Antropov	2-year	Extension	

== Draft picks ==
Toronto's picks at the 2006 NHL entry draft in Vancouver, British Columbia. The Leafs had the 13th overall draft pick in the 2005–06 NHL season. The Maple Leaf's 2006 draft has been referred to in retrospectives as one of the most successful drafts for any team in league history, as all but one of the team's picks (Tyler Ruegsegger) would go on to become NHL regulars at some point in their careers. Leo Komarov, the 180th pick, would be named an NHL All-Star in 2016.

Round	#	Player	Nationality	NHL team	College/Junior/Club team (League)
1	13	Jiri Tlusty (LW)	Czech Republic	Toronto Maple Leafs	HC Rabat Kladno (Czech Extraliga)
2	44	Nikolai Kulemin (W)	Russia	Toronto Maple Leafs	Metallurg Magnitogorsk (RSL)
4	99	James Reimer (G)	Canada	Toronto Maple Leafs (from Columbus)	Red Deer (WHL)
4	111	Korbinian Holzer (D)	Germany	Toronto Maple Leafs (from Colorado)	EC Bad Tölz (Eishockey-Bundesliga)
6	161	Viktor Stalberg (LW)	Sweden	Toronto Maple Leafs (from Phoenix)	Frölunda HC (Elitserien)
6	166	Tyler Ruegsegger (C)	United States	Toronto Maple Leafs	Shattuck-Saint Mary's / University of Denver
6	200	Leo Komarov (C)	Finland	Toronto Maple Leafs (from Dallas)	Ässät (SM-liiga)

== See also ==
- 2006–07 NHL season
