= 2005–06 New York Islanders season =

NHL hockey team season

2005–06 New York Islanders
- Division: 4th Atlantic
- Conference: 12th Eastern
- 2005–06 record: 36–40–6
- Home record: 20–18–3
- Road record: 16–22–3
- Goals for: 230
- Goals against: 278

Team information
- General manager: Mike Milbury
- Coach: Steve Stirling (Oct.–Jan.); Brad Shaw (Jan.–Apr.)
- Captain: Alexei Yashin
- Alternate captains: Brad Lukowich (Oct.–Mar.); Mark Parrish (Oct.–Mar.); Mike York (Mar.–Apr.); Alexei Zhitnik (Mar.–Apr.)
- Arena: Nassau Veterans Memorial Coliseum
- Average attendance: 12,609 (77.7%)
- Minor league affiliates: Bridgeport Sound Tigers; Mississippi Sea Wolves

Team leaders
- Goals: Miroslav Satan (35)
- Assists: Mike York (39)
- Points: Miroslav Satan (66); Alexei Yashin (66)
- Penalty minutes: Eric Godard (115)
- Plus/minus: Joel Bouchard (+5)
- Wins: Rick DiPietro (30)
- Goals against average: Rick DiPietro (3.02)

The 2005–06 New York Islanders season was the 34th season in the franchise's history. On March 14, 2006, the Islanders trailed the Montreal Canadiens by five points for the eighth and final playoff spot in the Eastern Conference, but won only five of their final 18 games to finish 12th in the East. Their 12th place finish meant that, for the first time since the 2000–01 season, the team would not qualify for the playoffs.

== Offseason ==
Forward Alexei Yashin was named team captain, replacing the traded Michael Peca.

== Regular season ==
After having lost eight of their previous nine games, the Islanders fired head coach Steve Stirling on January 12 and replaced him on an interim basis with assistant coach Brad Shaw. It was also announced that general manager Mike Milbury would step away from that position once a successor was hired.

- March 4, 2006 - The Islanders held a special ceremony before the game commemorating the 25th anniversary of the team's first Stanley Cup victory. The Islanders coincidentally played the Flyers, the team that they faced back in 1980 and defeated them that night by a score of 4-2.

=== Final standings ===
Atlantic Division
No.	CR		GP	W	L	OTL	GF	GA	Pts
1	3	New Jersey Devils	82	46	27	9	242	229	101
2	5	Philadelphia Flyers	82	45	26	11	267	259	101
3	6	New York Rangers	82	44	26	12	257	215	100
4	12	New York Islanders	82	36	40	6	230	278	78
5	15	Pittsburgh Penguins	82	22	46	14	244	316	58

Eastern Conference
R		Div	GP	W	L	OTL	GF	GA	Pts
1	Z- Ottawa Senators	NE	82	52	21	9	314	211	113
2	Y- Carolina Hurricanes	SE	82	52	22	8	294	260	112
3	Y- New Jersey Devils	AT	82	46	27	9	242	229	101
4	X- Buffalo Sabres	NE	82	52	24	6	242	239	110
5	X- Philadelphia Flyers	AT	82	45	26	11	267	259	101
6	X- New York Rangers	AT	82	44	26	12	257	215	100
7	X- Montreal Canadiens	NE	82	42	31	9	243	247	93
8	X- Tampa Bay Lightning	SE	82	43	33	6	252	260	92
8.5
9	Toronto Maple Leafs	NE	82	41	33	8	257	270	90
10	Atlanta Thrashers	SE	82	41	33	8	281	275	90
11	Florida Panthers	SE	82	37	34	11	240	257	85
12	New York Islanders	AT	82	36	40	6	230	278	78
13	Boston Bruins	NE	82	29	37	16	230	266	74
14	Washington Capitals	SE	82	29	41	12	237	306	70
15	Pittsburgh Penguins	AT	82	22	46	14	244	316	58

Divisions: AT – Atlantic, NE – Northeast, SE – Southeast

Z – Clinched conference; Y – Clinched division; X – Clinched playoff spot

== Schedule and results ==
2005–06 regular season
October: 5–6–0 (home: 3–2–0; road: 2–4–0)

Game	Date	Score	Opponent	Record	Recap
1	October 5, 2005	4–6	@ Buffalo Sabres (2005–06)	0–1–0	L
2	October 8, 2005	3–2	Carolina Hurricanes (2005–06)	1–1–0	W
3	October 10, 2005	1–3	Florida Panthers (2005–06)	1–2–0	L
4	October 13, 2005	5–3	@ Washington Capitals (2005–06)	2–2–0	W
5	October 15, 2005	1–5	@ Philadelphia Flyers (2005–06)	2–3–0	L
6	October 19, 2005	3–2 SO	@ New York Rangers (2005–06)	3–3–0	W
7	October 20, 2005	5–4	New York Rangers (2005–06)	4–3–0	W
8	October 22, 2005	3–4	@ Montreal Canadiens (2005–06)	4–4–0	L
9	October 25, 2005	4–3	Atlanta Thrashers (2005–06)	5–4–0	W
10	October 27, 2005	1–3	@ New York Rangers (2005–06)	5–5–0	L
11	October 29, 2005	4–6	Buffalo Sabres (2005–06)	5–6–0	L

November: 7–6–1 (home: 2–3–1; road: 5–3–0)

Game	Date	Score	Opponent	Record	Recap
12	November 1, 2005	4–3 OT	Boston Bruins (2005–06)	6–6–0	W
13	November 3, 2005	1–5	Pittsburgh Penguins (2005–06)	6–7–0	L
14	November 5, 2005	0–6	@ Ottawa Senators (2005–06)	6–8–0	L
15	November 8, 2005	4–1	@ New Jersey Devils (2005–06)	7–8–0	W
16	November 10, 2005	2–3	@ Philadelphia Flyers (2005–06)	7–9–0	L
17	November 12, 2005	5–2	Boston Bruins (2005–06)	8–9–0	W
18	November 14, 2005	3–2 SO	@ Pittsburgh Penguins (2005–06)	9–9–0	W
19	November 16, 2005	7–3	@ Atlanta Thrashers (2005–06)	10–9–0	W
20	November 17, 2005	2–3	@ Tampa Bay Lightning (2005–06)	10–10–0	L
21	November 19, 2005	5–3	@ Florida Panthers (2005–06)	11–10–0	W
22	November 23, 2005	3–4 SO	Buffalo Sabres (2005–06)	11–10–1	OTL
23	November 25, 2005	2–6	Ottawa Senators (2005–06)	11–11–1	L
24	November 26, 2005	4–2	@ Philadelphia Flyers (2005–06)	12–11–1	W
25	November 29, 2005	3–4	Philadelphia Flyers (2005–06)	12–12–1	L

December: 5–6–1 (home: 3–3–0; road: 2–3–1)

Game	Date	Score	Opponent	Record	Recap
26	December 4, 2005	2–1	@ Detroit Red Wings (2005–06)	13–12–1	W
27	December 6, 2005	6–3	@ St. Louis Blues (2005–06)	14–12–1	W
28	December 8, 2005	3–4 SO	@ Columbus Blue Jackets (2005–06)	14–12–2	OTL
29	December 10, 2005	3–2 SO	Edmonton Oilers (2005–06)	15–12–2	W
30	December 13, 2005	3–4	Minnesota Wild (2005–06)	15–13–2	L
31	December 17, 2005	5–4	Colorado Avalanche (2005–06)	16–13–2	W
32	December 19, 2005	6–9	@ Toronto Maple Leafs (2005–06)	16–14–2	L
33	December 21, 2005	4–2	New Jersey Devils (2005–06)	17–14–2	W
34	December 23, 2005	2–4	Ottawa Senators (2005–06)	17–15–2	L
35	December 26, 2005	3–6	@ Buffalo Sabres (2005–06)	17–16–2	L
36	December 28, 2005	2–6	New York Rangers (2005–06)	17–17–2	L
37	December 30, 2005	3–4	@ Ottawa Senators (2005–06)	17–18–2	L

January: 6–7–1 (home: 4–4–0; road: 2–3–1)

Game	Date	Score	Opponent	Record	Recap
38	January 2, 2006	1–2	Tampa Bay Lightning (2005–06)	17–19–2	L
39	January 4, 2006	4–3 OT	Florida Panthers (2005–06)	18–19–2	W
40	January 6, 2006	1–4	@ Carolina Hurricanes (2005–06)	18–20–2	L
41	January 7, 2006	0–3	Carolina Hurricanes (2005–06)	18–21–2	L
42	January 10, 2006	1–2	@ Nashville Predators (2005–06)	18–22–2	L
43	January 12, 2006	3–2	Calgary Flames (2005–06)	19–22–2	W
44	January 14, 2006	1–8	Vancouver Canucks (2005–06)	19–23–2	L
45	January 17, 2006	2–1 OT	@ Chicago Blackhawks (2005–06)	20–23–2	W
46	January 19, 2006	3–4	@ Carolina Hurricanes (2005–06)	20–24–2	L
47	January 21, 2006	2–3 SO	@ New Jersey Devils (2005–06)	20–24–3	OTL
48	January 24, 2006	0–4	New Jersey Devils (2005–06)	20–25–3	L
49	January 26, 2006	4–3 SO	Pittsburgh Penguins (2005–06)	21–25–3	W
50	January 28, 2006	4–3	@ Boston Bruins (2005–06)	22–25–3	W
51	January 31, 2006	5–3	Washington Capitals (2005–06)	23–25–3	W

February: 2–3–1 (home: 0–2–1; road: 2–1–0)

Game	Date	Score	Opponent	Record	Recap
52	February 2, 2006	2–5	New York Rangers (2005–06)	23–26–3	L
53	February 4, 2006	5–4 SO	@ Pittsburgh Penguins (2005–06)	24–26–3	W
54	February 6, 2006	2–3 OT	Tampa Bay Lightning (2005–06)	24–26–4	OTL
55	February 8, 2006	2–5	@ Philadelphia Flyers (2005–06)	24–27–4	L
56	February 11, 2006	2–1	@ New Jersey Devils (2005–06)	25–27–4	W
57	February 28, 2006	3–5	Montreal Canadiens (2005–06)	25–28–4	L

March: 8–7–1 (home: 6–2–0; road: 2–5–1)

Game	Date	Score	Opponent	Record	Recap
58	March 2, 2006	3–2 SO	New Jersey Devils (2005–06)	26–28–4	W
59	March 4, 2006	4–2	Philadelphia Flyers (2005–06)	27–28–4	W
60	March 6, 2006	2–5	@ Washington Capitals (2005–06)	27–29–4	L
61	March 7, 2006	2–1 SO	New Jersey Devils (2005–06)	28–29–4	W
62	March 10, 2006	2–1 SO	Toronto Maple Leafs (2005–06)	29–29–4	W
63	March 11, 2006	3–1	@ Boston Bruins (2005–06)	30–29–4	W
64	March 14, 2006	6–1	@ New Jersey Devils (2005–06)	31–29–4	W
65	March 16, 2006	2–4	@ Atlanta Thrashers (2005–06)	31–30–4	L
66	March 17, 2006	2–4	@ Florida Panthers (2005–06)	31–31–4	L
67	March 19, 2006	2–5	@ Tampa Bay Lightning (2005–06)	31–32–4	L
68	March 21, 2006	3–1	Montreal Canadiens (2005–06)	32–32–4	W
69	March 24, 2006	3–4 OT	@ Pittsburgh Penguins (2005–06)	32–32–5	OTL
70	March 25, 2006	5–1	Atlanta Thrashers (2005–06)	33–32–5	W
71	March 28, 2006	0–2	@ Montreal Canadiens (2005–06)	33–33–5	L
72	March 29, 2006	1–5	New York Rangers (2005–06)	33–34–5	L
73	March 31, 2006	0–4	Pittsburgh Penguins (2005–06)	33–35–5	L

April: 3–5–1 (home: 2–2–1; road: 1–3–0)

Game	Date	Score	Opponent	Record	Recap
74	April 2, 2006	1–4	Philadelphia Flyers (2005–06)	33–36–5	L
75	April 5, 2006	2–3	@ Toronto Maple Leafs (2005–06)	33–37–5	L
76	April 6, 2006	1–3	@ New York Rangers (2005–06)	33–38–5	L
77	April 8, 2006	5–0	Washington Capitals (2005–06)	34–38–5	W
78	April 11, 2006	3–2	@ New York Rangers (2005–06)	35–38–5	W
79	April 13, 2006	3–4 OT	Toronto Maple Leafs (2005–06)	35–38–6	OTL
80	April 15, 2006	5–4 SO	Pittsburgh Penguins (2005–06)	36–38–6	W
81	April 17, 2006	1–6	@ Pittsburgh Penguins (2005–06)	36–39–6	L
82	April 18, 2006	1–4	Philadelphia Flyers (2005–06)	36–40–6	L

Legend: W Win (2 points) L Loss (0 points) OTL Overtime/shootout loss (1 point)

== Player statistics ==
=== Scoring ===
- Position abbreviations: C = Center; D = Defense; G = Goaltender; LW = Left wing; RW = Right wing
- † = Joined team via a transaction (e.g., trade, waivers, signing) during the season. Stats reflect time with the Islanders only.
- ‡ = Left team via a transaction (e.g., trade, waivers, release) during the season. Stats reflect time with the Islanders only.

No.	Player	Pos	Regular season					
No.	Player	Pos	GP	G	A	Pts	+/-	PIM
81	Miroslav Satan	LW	82	35	31	66	−8	54
79	Alexei Yashin	C	82	28	38	66	−14	68
55	Jason Blake	C	76	28	29	57	0	60
16	Mike York	LW	75	13	39	52	−9	30
37	Mark Parrish‡	RW	57	24	17	41	−14	16
7	Trent Hunter	RW	82	16	19	35	−9	34
17	Shawn Bates	C	66	15	19	34	−11	60
14	Chris Campoli	D	80	9	25	34	−16	46
77	Alexei Zhitnik	D	59	5	24	29	4	88
3	Brent Sopel‡	D	57	2	25	27	−9	64
45	Arron Asham	RW	63	9	15	24	−5	103
12	Oleg Kvasha‡	LW	49	9	12	21	−2	32
21	Robert Nilsson	C	53	6	14	20	−6	26
24	Radek Martinek	D	74	1	16	17	−9	32
25	Brad Lukowich‡	D	57	1	12	13	−3	32
44	Janne Niinimaa‡	D	41	1	9	10	−7	62
10	Sean Bergenheim	LW	28	4	5	9	−11	20
4	Joel Bouchard	D	25	1	8	9	5	23
18	Jeff Hamilton	C	13	2	6	8	0	8
28	Wyatt Smith	C	42	0	8	8	−7	26
6	Bruno Gervais	D	27	3	4	7	−1	8
11	Mattias Weinhandl‡	RW	53	2	4	6	−4	14
49	Eric Godard	RW	57	2	2	4	−2	115
15	Jeff Tambellini†	LW	21	1	3	4	2	8
3	Denis Grebeshkov†	D	21	0	3	3	−8	8
26 (Note: Collins wore number 54 in his first game.)	Rob Collins	C	8	1	1	2	1	0
27	Jeremy Colliton	C	19	1	1	2	2	6
29	Petteri Nokelainen	C	15	1	1	2	−1	4
44	John Erskine†	D	34	1	0	1	−12	99
39	Rick DiPietro	G	63	0	1	1		28
38	Allan Rourke	D	6	0	1	1	1	0
43	Ryan Caldwell	D	2	0	0	0	−2	2
62	Kevin Colley‡	C	16	0	0	0	−2	52
34	Wade Dubielewicz	G	7	0	0	0		0
63	Cole Jarrett	W	1	0	0	0	1	0
40	Matt Koalska	C	3	0	0	0	−1	2
58	Masi Marjamaki	RW	1	0	0	0	0	0
8	Tomi Pettinen	D	18	0	0	0	−2	16
48	Steve Regier	LW	9	0	0	0	−1	0
30	Garth Snow	G	20	0	0	0		2

=== Goaltending ===
No.	Player	Regular season									
No.	Player	GP	W	L	OT	SA	GA	GAA	SV%	SO	TOI
39	Rick DiPietro	63	30	24	5	1797	180	3.02	.900	1	3572
30	Garth Snow	20	4	13	1	595	68	3.72	.886	0	1096
34	Wade Dubielewicz	7	2	3	0	145	15	2.90	.897	0	310

== Awards and records ==
=== Awards ===
Type	Award/honor	Recipient	Ref
League (in-season)	NHL Defensive Player of the Week	Rick DiPietro (March 13)	
Team	Bob Nystrom Award	Kevin Colley	

=== Milestones ===
Milestone	Player	Date	Ref
First game	Chris Campoli	October 5, 2005	
First game	Robert Nilsson	October 5, 2005	
First game	Petteri Nokelainen	October 5, 2005	
First game	Kevin Colley	October 27, 2005	
First game	Jeremy Colliton	November 23, 2005	
First game	Bruno Gervais	December 4, 2005	
First game	Rob Collins	December 17, 2005	
First game	Steve Regier	April 2, 2006	
First game	Matt Koalska	April 13, 2006	
First game	Ryan Caldwell	April 15, 2006	
First game	Cole Jarrett	April 18, 2006	
First game	Masi Marjamaki	April 18, 2006	

== Transactions ==
The Islanders were involved in the following transactions from February 17, 2005, the day after the 2004–05 NHL season was officially cancelled, through June 19, 2006, the day of the deciding game of the 2006 Stanley Cup Finals.

=== Trades ===
Date	Details		Ref
August 3, 2005	To Vancouver Canucks: Conditional 2nd-round pick in 2006 (Note: If the Islanders signed Sopel beyond the 2005–06 season, Vancouver would receive a 2006 second round pick. If the Islanders didn’t sign him, Vancouver would instead receive a 2006 third round pick.)	To New York Islanders: Brent Sopel	
August 3, 2005	To Edmonton Oilers: Michael Peca	To New York Islanders: Mike York; Conditional draft pick in 2006 (Note: 4th-round pick)	
January 10, 2006	To Dallas Stars: Janne Niinimaa; 5th-round pick in 2007	To New York Islanders: John Erskine; 2nd-round pick in 2006	
March 8, 2006	To Los Angeles Kings: Mark Parrish; Brent Sopel	To New York Islanders: Denis Grebeshkov; Jeff Tambellini; Conditional 3rd-round pick in 2006 (Note: The Islanders would receive the pick if Los Angeles made the playoffs.)	
March 9, 2006	To Phoenix Coyotes: Oleg Kvasha; Conditional 5th-round pick (Note: Phoenix would receive the pick if they did not re-sign Kvasha.)	To New York Islanders: 3rd-round pick in 2006	
March 9, 2006	To New Jersey Devils: Brad Lukowich	To New York Islanders: 3rd-round pick in 2006	

=== Players acquired ===
Date	Player	Former team	Term	Via	Ref
August 2, 2005	Alexei Zhitnik	Ak Bars Kazan (RSL)	4-year	Free agency	
August 3, 2005	Miroslav Satan	Buffalo Sabres	3-year	Free agency	
August 10, 2005	Wyatt Smith	Nashville Predators		Free agency	
August 11, 2005	Brad Lukowich	Tampa Bay Lightning	2-year	Free agency	
August 12, 2005	Allan Rourke	Carolina Hurricanes		Free agency	
August 18, 2005	Joel Bouchard	Hartford Wolf Pack (AHL)	1-year	Free agency	
September 6, 2005	Travis Brigley	Valerenga (GET)	1-year	Free agency	
September 10, 2005	Paul Flache	Atlanta Thrashers		Free agency	
January 5, 2006	Frederic Cloutier	Bridgeport Sound Tigers (AHL)		Free agency	

=== Players lost ===
Date	Player	New team	Via (Note: In parentheses is the player's free agency group on August 1 if applicable.)	Ref
April 6, 2005	Kenny Jonsson	Rogle BK (Allsvenskan)	Retirement (II) (Note: Jonsson retired from the NHL. The Islanders retained Jonsson’s NHL rights through the 2005–06 season.)	
June 16, 2005	Graham Belak	Coventry Blaze (EIHL)	Free agency (UFA)	
July 12, 2005	Blaine Down	Ritten Sport (Serie A)	Free agency (UFA)	
July 29, 2005	Dieter Kochan	HC Sibir Novosibirsk (RSL)	Free agency (VI)	
August 2, 2005	Adrian Aucoin	Chicago Blackhawks	Free agency (III)	
August 2, 2005	Dave Scatchard	Boston Bruins	Free agency (V)	
August 12, 2005	Ryan Kraft	Kassel Huskies (DEL)	Free agency (VI)	
August 15, 2005	Roman Hamrlik	Calgary Flames	Free agency (III)	
August 18, 2005	Jim Campbell	Tampa Bay Lightning	Free agency (III)	
August 22, 2005	Sven Butenschon	Vancouver Canucks	Free agency (UFA)	
September 1, 2005	Richard Seeley	Manchester Monarchs (AHL)	Free agency (VI)	
September 4, 2005	Jeff Hamilton	Ak Bars Kazan (RSL)	Free agency (Note: The Islanders retained Hamilton's NHL rights and re-signed him on November 14.)	
September 6, 2005	Justin Mapletoft	Jokerit (Liiga)	Free agency (II)	
October 17, 2005	Barrett Heisten	Alaska Aces (ECHL)	Free agency (VI)	
February 24, 2006	Kevin Colley		Retirement	
March 4, 2006	Mattias Weinhandl	Minnesota Wild	Waivers	
May 5, 2006	Tomi Pettinen	Frölunda HC (SHL)	Free agency	
June 14, 2006	Travis Brigley	Augsburger Panther (DEL)	Free agency	

=== Signings ===
Date	Player	Term	Contract type	Ref
July 28, 2005	Jeremy Colliton	3-year	Entry-level	
July 29, 2005	Garth Snow	3-year	Re-signing	
August 12, 2005	Mattias Weinhandl	2-year	Re-signing	
August 13, 2005	Trent Hunter	1-year	Re-signing	
August 13, 2005	Mike York	1-year	Re-signing	
August 15, 2005	Arron Asham	1-year	Re-signing	
August 15, 2005	Oleg Kvasha	1-year	Re-signing	
August 16, 2005	Radek Martinek	1-year	Re-signing	
August 16, 2005	Brent Sopel	2-year	Re-signing	
August 17, 2005	Masi Marjamaki	3-year	Entry-level	
August 22, 2005	Shawn Bates	1-year	Re-signing	
August 23, 2005	Petteri Nokelainen	3-year	Entry-level	
August 24, 2005	Justin Papineau	1-year	Re-signing	
August 30, 2005	Robert Nilsson	3-year	Entry-level	
August 31, 2005	Tomi Pettinen	1-year	Re-signing	
September 1, 2005	Kevin Colley	1-year	Re-signing	
September 1, 2005	Rob Collins	1-year	Re-signing	
September 7, 2005	Rick DiPietro	1-year	Re-signing	
September 12, 2005	Mark Parrish	1-year	Re-signing	
September 29, 2005	Eric Godard		Re-signing	
November 14, 2005	Jeff Hamilton		Re-signing	
March 6, 2006	Shawn Bates	3-year	Extension	
March 7, 2006	Radek Martinek	2-year	Extension	
March 22, 2006	Blake Comeau	3-year	Entry-level	
March 30, 2006	Ryan O'Marra	3-year	Entry-level	
May 15, 2006	Frans Nielsen	2-year	Entry-level	
May 16, 2006	Johan Halvardsson		Entry-level	
June 1, 2006	Jason Pitton		Entry-level	

== Draft picks ==
New York's draft picks at the 2005 NHL entry draft held at the Westin Hotel in Ottawa, Ontario.

Round	#	Player	Nationality	College/Junior/Club team (League)
1	15	Ryan O'Marra	Canada	Erie Otters (OHL)
2	46	Dustin Kohn	Canada	Calgary Hitmen (WHL)
3	76	Shea Guthrie	Canada	St. George's School (USHS-RI)
5	144	Masi Marjamaki	Finland	Moose Jaw Warriors (WHL)
6	180	Tyrell Mason	Canada	Salmon Arm Silverbacks (BCHL)
7	196	Nick Tuzzolino	Canada	Sarnia Sting (OHL)
7	210	Luciano Aquino	Canada	Brampton Battalion (OHL)

== See also ==
- 2005–06 NHL season
