= 2005–06 Buffalo Sabres season =

NHL hockey team season

2005–06 Buffalo Sabres
- Division: 2nd Northeast
- Conference: 4th Eastern
- 2005–06 record: 52–24–6
- Home record: 27–11–3
- Road record: 25–13–3
- Goals for: 281
- Goals against: 239

Team information
- General manager: Darcy Regier
- Coach: Lindy Ruff
- Captain: Daniel Briere and Chris Drury
- Alternate captains: Mike Grier; Jochen Hecht; Jay McKee
- Arena: HSBC Arena
- Average attendance: 16,886
- Minor league affiliate: Rochester Americans

Team leaders
- Goals: Chris Drury (30)
- Assists: Maxim Afinogenov (51)
- Points: Maxim Afinogenov (73)
- Penalty minutes: Andrew Peters (100)
- Plus/minus: Dmitri Kalinin (+14)
- Wins: Ryan Miller (30)
- Goals against average: Ryan Miller (2.60)

The 2005–06 Buffalo Sabres season was the 36th season of operation, 35th season of play, for the National Hockey League (NHL) franchise that was established on May 22, 1970. The season not only saw the team qualify for the Stanley Cup playoffs for the first time since the 2000–01 season, but saw them advance to Game 7 of the Eastern Conference finals before losing to the eventual Stanley Cup champions, the Carolina Hurricanes.

After starting the season 7–8–0 through their first 15 games by November 9, 2005, the Sabres were sitting in fifth place in the Northeast Division and were trailing the Northeast Division-leading Ottawa Senators by 11 points. The Sabres then went on to have only eight regulation losses out of their next 50 games; by March 16, 2006, they had improved to 44–16–5 to move within one point of the Northeast Division-leading Senators. Despite having only two players to play all 82 games (Ales Kotalik and Henrik Tallinder), Buffalo would finish the season with a 52–24–6 record for 110 points and a fourth-place finish heading into the playoffs. The season was the first 100–point season in 23 years and tied the 1979–80 club for the second-best point total in franchise history. The Sabres were one of five teams to reach the century mark in power-play goals during the regular season, scoring 101. The Sabres also finished with 25 road wins, another franchise record.

The Sabres were recognized on June 22, 2006, at the NHL Awards Ceremony, when Lindy Ruff edged Hurricanes coach Peter Laviolette to win the Jack Adams Award as Coach of the Year in the closest vote in the award's history. Ruff was the second Sabres coach to win the award.

== Regular season ==
On January 14, 2006, the Sabres defeated the Los Angeles Kings at home by a score of 10–1. Jochen Hecht and Jason Pominville each had hat-tricks in the game. It was the first time that the Sabres had scored 10 goals in a regular-season game since February 24, 1993, when they defeated the Detroit Red Wings at home by a score of 10–7.

=== Season standings ===
Northeast Division
No.	CR		GP	W	L	OTL	GF	GA	Pts
1	1	**Ottawa Senators**	82	52	21	9	314	211	113
2	4	**Buffalo Sabres**	82	52	24	6	281	239	110
3	7	**Montreal Canadiens**	82	42	31	9	243	247	93
4	9	Toronto Maple Leafs	82	41	33	8	257	270	90
5	13	Boston Bruins	82	29	37	16	230	266	74

Note: CR = Conference rank; GP = Games played; W = Wins; L = Losses; OTL = Overtime/Shootout loss; GF = Goals for; GA = Goals against; Pts = Points
Bolded teams qualified for the playoffs.

Eastern Conference
R		Div	GP	W	L	OTL	GF	GA	Pts
**1**	**Z-** Ottawa Senators	**NE**	**82**	**52**	**21**	**9**	**314**	**211**	113
**2**	**Y-** Carolina Hurricanes	**SE**	**82**	**52**	**22**	**8**	**294**	**260**	112
**3**	**Y-** New Jersey Devils	**AT**	**82**	**46**	**27**	**9**	**242**	**229**	101
**4**	**X-** Buffalo Sabres	**NE**	**82**	**52**	**24**	**6**	**242**	**239**	110
**5**	**X-** Philadelphia Flyers	**AT**	**82**	**45**	**26**	**11**	**267**	**259**	101
**6**	**X-** New York Rangers	**AT**	**82**	**44**	**26**	**12**	**257**	**215**	100
**7**	**X-** Montreal Canadiens	**NE**	**82**	**42**	**31**	**9**	**243**	**247**	93
**8**	**X-** Tampa Bay Lightning	**SE**	**82**	**43**	**33**	**6**	**252**	**260**	92
8.5
9	Toronto Maple Leafs	NE	82	41	33	8	257	270	90
10	Atlanta Thrashers	SE	82	41	33	8	281	275	90
11	Florida Panthers	SE	82	37	34	11	240	257	85
12	New York Islanders	AT	82	36	40	6	230	278	78
13	Boston Bruins	NE	82	29	37	16	230	266	74
14	Washington Capitals	SE	82	29	41	12	237	306	70
15	Pittsburgh Penguins	AT	82	22	46	14	244	316	58

Divisions: AT – Atlantic, NE – Northeast, SE – Southeast

Z – Clinched conference; Y – Clinched division; X – Clinched playoff spot

== Playoffs ==
The Buffalo Sabres earned the fourth seed in the Eastern Conference.

Buffalo defeated the Philadelphia Flyers in the first-round of the 2006 playoffs in six games. In the second round, the Sabres defeated top-seeded Ottawa in five games. A total of three victories in the series came in overtime, including the series-clinching Game 5, which was won on a short-handed goal by Jason Pominville to send Buffalo to the Eastern Conference Finals against the Carolina Hurricanes. It was the first time in NHL history that a series had been decided on a short-handed overtime goal.

Despite being without some or all of their four top defensemen (Teppo Numminen, Dmitri Kalinin, Jay McKee and Henrik Tallinder), and their top powerplay scorer, Tim Connolly, who had 11 points in eight games in the playoffs, for much of the series, the Sabres fought back from a three-games-to-two deficit to force a seventh game by way of a 2–1 overtime win in Game 6. Buffalo led the Hurricanes 2–1 going into the final period of the deciding game but blew the lead early in the third and gave up two more late goals for a 4–2 final score.

== Schedule and results ==
=== Regular season ===
2005–06 regular season
October: 7–4–0 (home: 4–1–0; road: 3–3–0)

Game	Date	Visitor	Score	Home	OT	Decision	Attendance	Record	Points	Recap
1	October 5	NY Islanders	4 – 6	Buffalo		Miller	15,702	1–0–0	2	W
2	October 7	Boston	1 – 4	Buffalo		Miller	13,771	2–0–0	4	W
3	October 8	Buffalo	0 – 5	Ottawa		Miller	19,661	2–1–0	4	L
4	October 10	Pittsburgh	2 – 3	Buffalo	OT	Miller	12,050	3–1–0	6	W
5	October 13	Buffalo	4 – 3	Tampa Bay	SO	Miller	20,184	4–1–0	8	W
6	October 15	Buffalo	2 – 3	Florida		Miller	17,426	4–2–0	8	L
7	October 20	Buffalo	4 – 3	Boston		Miller	14,525	5–2–0	10	W
8	October 22	NY Rangers	1 – 3	Buffalo		Miller	16,346	6–2–0	12	W
9	October 26	Washington	3 – 2	Buffalo		Miller	8,552	6–3–0	12	L
10	October 28	Buffalo	2 – 3	New Jersey		Miller	12,378	6–4–0	12	L
11	October 29	Buffalo	6 – 4	NY Islanders		Biron	13,226	7–4–0	14	W

November: 8–5–1 (home: 4–3–1; road: 4–2–0)

Game	Date	Visitor	Score	Home	OT	Decision	Attendance	Record	Points	Recap
12	November 2	Ottawa	10 – 4	Buffalo		Noronen	13,905	7–5–0	14	L
13	November 4	Montreal	3 – 2	Buffalo		Biron	18,690	7–6–0	14	L
14	November 5	Buffalo	2 – 3	Montreal		Biron	21,273	7–7–0	14	L
15	November 9	Carolina	5 – 3	Buffalo		Biron	13,106	7–8–0	14	L
16	November 11	Toronto	2 – 5	Buffalo		Biron	18,690	8–8–0	16	W
17	November 12	Buffalo	1 – 6	Ottawa		Biron	19,414	8–9–0	16	L
18	November 15	New Jersey	1 – 4	Buffalo		Biron	13,022	9–9–0	18	W
19	November 17	Washington	5 – 8	Buffalo		Biron	12,471	10–9–0	20	W
20	November 19	Buffalo	3 – 2	Boston		Noronen	17,565	11–9–0	22	W
21	November 22	NY Rangers	3 – 2	Buffalo	SO	Biron	16,018	11–9–1	23	OTL
22	November 23	Buffalo	4 – 3	NY Islanders	SO	Biron	13,212	12–9–1	25	W
23	November 25	Montreal	1 – 3	Buffalo		Biron	16,009	13–9–1	27	W
24	November 27	Buffalo	3 – 2	Washington		Biron	11,658	14–9–1	29	W
25	November 29	Buffalo	3 – 2	Pittsburgh		Biron	15,118	15–9–1	31	W

December: 11–2–1 (home: 5–1–0; road: 6–1–1)

Game	Date	Visitor	Score	Home	OT	Decision	Attendance	Record	Points	Recap
26	December 1	Buffalo	3 – 2	Montreal	OT	Biron	21,274	16–9–1	33	W
27	December 2	San Jose	5 – 0	Buffalo		Noronen	18,007	16–10–1	33	L
28	December 4	Buffalo	6 – 4	Colorado		Biron	18,007	17–10–1	35	W
29	December 8	Anaheim	2 – 3	Buffalo	OT	Biron	12,504	18–10–1	37	W
30	December 11	Buffalo	3 – 2	Minnesota		Biron	18,568	19–10–1	39	W
31	December 14	Dallas	3 – 4	Buffalo		Biron	16,575	20–10–1	41	W
32	December 16	Buffalo	4 – 3	Pittsburgh	OT	Biron	16,648	21–10–1	43	W
33	December 17	Pittsburgh	3 – 4	Buffalo		Biron	18,690	22–10–1	45	W
34	December 19	Buffalo	2 – 1	Philadelphia	SO	Miller	19,572	23–10–1	47	W
35	December 22	Buffalo	1 – 4	Florida		Biron	17,823	23–11–1	47	L
36	December 23	Buffalo	4 – 1	Tampa Bay		Miller	21,120	24–11–1	49	W
37	December 26	NY Islanders	3 – 6	Buffalo		Miller	18,690	25–11–1	51	W
38	December 29	Buffalo	3 – 4	Toronto	SO	Biron	19,364	25–11–2	52	OTL
39	December 30	Atlanta	1 – 4	Buffalo		Miller	18,690	26–11–2	54	W

January: 6–4–1 (home: 2–2–1; road: 4–2–0)

Game	Date	Visitor	Score	Home	OT	Decision	Attendance	Record	Points	Recap
40	January 1	Florida	2 – 1	Buffalo		Miller	18,690	26–12–2	54	L
41	January 5	Tampa Bay	1 – 3	Buffalo		Miller	18,032	27–12–2	56	W
42	January 7	New Jersey	3 – 2	Buffalo		Miller	18,690	27–13–2	56	L
43	January 12	Phoenix	2 – 1	Buffalo	SO	Biron	18,690	27–13–3	57	OTL
44	January 14	Los Angeles	1 – 10	Buffalo		Miller	18,690	28–13–3	59	W
45	January 16	Buffalo	3 – 1	Edmonton		Miller	16,839	29–13–3	61	W
46	January 19	Buffalo	1 – 4	Vancouver		Miller	18,630	29–14–3	61	L
47	January 21	Buffalo	1 – 4	Calgary		Biron	19,289	29–15–3	61	L
48	January 24	Buffalo	2 – 1	NY Rangers		Miller	18,200	30–15–3	63	W
49	January 26	Buffalo	8 – 4	Toronto		Miller	19,477	31–15–3	65	W
50	January 31	Buffalo	5 – 2	Atlanta		Miller	14,021	32–15–3	67	W

February: 4–0–2 (home: 3–0–1; road: 1–0–1)

Game	Date	Visitor	Score	Home	OT	Decision	Attendance	Record	Points	Recap
51	February 2	Philadelphia	2 – 4	Buffalo		Miller	18,690	33–15–3	69	W
52	February 4	Ottawa	1 – 2	Buffalo	SO	Miller	17,451	34–15–3	71	W
53	February 7	Buffalo	3 – 2	Montreal	OT	Miller	21,273	35–15–3	73	W
54	February 9	Montreal	3 – 2	Buffalo	OT	Miller	17,344	35–15–4	74	OTL
55	February 11	Florida	3 – 5	Buffalo		Miller	18,690	36–15–4	76	W
56	February 12	Buffalo	3 – 4	Carolina	SO	Miller	18,730	36–15–5	77	OTL

March: 9–7–1 (home: 6–3–0; road: 3–4–1)

Game	Date	Visitor	Score	Home	OT	Decision	Attendance	Record	Points	Recap
57	March 1	Atlanta	4 – 2	Buffalo		Miller	18,690	36–16–5	77	L
58	March 3	Toronto	2 – 6	Buffalo		Miller	18,690	37–16–5	79	W
59	March 4	Buffalo	3 – 2	Boston		Biron	16,065	38–16–5	81	W
60	March 7	Boston	2 – 3	Buffalo		Miller	18,117	39–16–5	83	W
61	March 9	Tampa Bay	5 – 8	Buffalo		Miller	17,934	40–16–5	85	W
62	March 11	Buffalo	6 – 5	Philadelphia		Biron	19,717	41–16–5	87	W
63	March 12	Boston	2 – 6	Buffalo		Biron	18,690	42–16–5	89	W
64	March 14	Buffalo	6 – 4	Washington		Miller	14,386	43–16–5	91	W
65	March 16	Toronto	1 – 3	Buffalo		Miller	18,690	44–16–5	93	W
66	March 18	Buffalo	2 – 4	Ottawa		Miller	19,947	44–17–5	93	L
67	March 20	Buffalo	0 – 5	Atlanta		Biron	14,133	44–18–5	93	L
68	March 22	Carolina	4 – 3	Buffalo		Miller	18,690	44–19–5	93	L
69	March 24	Ottawa	3 – 1	Buffalo		Miller	18,690	44–20–5	93	L
70	March 25	Buffalo	4 – 5	Boston		Miller	15,710	44–21–5	93	L
71	March 27	Buffalo	4 – 5	NY Rangers	SO	Miller	18,200	44–21–6	94	OTL
72	March 29	Boston	3 – 4	Buffalo		Miller	16,261	45–21–6	96	W
73	March 30	Buffalo	1 – 3	New Jersey		Biron	12,425	45–22–6	96	L

April: 7–2–0 (home: 3–1–0; road: 4–1–0)

Game	Date	Visitor	Score	Home	OT	Decision	Attendance	Record	Points	Recap
74	April 1	Buffalo	0 – 7	Toronto		Miller	19,434	45–23–6	96	L
75	April 3	Buffalo	3 – 2	Toronto	SO	Biron	19,320	46–23–6	98	W
76	April 5	Ottawa	4 – 5	Buffalo	OT	Biron	17,622	47–23–6	100	W
77	April 7	Philadelphia	4 – 2	Buffalo		Miller	16,909	47–24–6	100	L
78	April 8	Buffalo	6 – 2	Ottawa		Miller	19,575	48–24–6	102	W
79	April 12	Montreal	1 – 3	Buffalo		Miller	18,201	49–24–6	104	W
80	April 15	Buffalo	4 – 2	Montreal		Miller	21,273	50–24–6	106	W
81	April 16	Toronto	0 – 6	Buffalo		Miller	18,690	51–24–6	108	W
82	April 18	Buffalo	4 – 0	Carolina		Biron	18,730	52–24–6	110	W

Legend: W Win (2 points) L Loss (0 points) OTL Overtime/shootout loss (1 point)

=== Playoffs ===
2006 Stanley Cup playoffs
Eastern Conference Quarterfinals vs. (5) Philadelphia Flyers – Sabres win 4–2

Game	Date	Visitor	Score	Home	OT	Decision	Attendance	Series	Recap
1	April 22	Philadelphia	2 – 3	Buffalo	2OT	Miller	18,690	Sabres lead 1–0	W
2	April 24	Philadelphia	2 – 8	Buffalo		Miller	18,690	Sabres lead 2–0	W
3	April 26	Buffalo	2 – 4	Philadelphia		Miller	19,984	Sabres lead 2–1	L
4	April 28	Buffalo	4 – 5	Philadelphia		Miller	20,092	Series tied 2–2	L
5	April 30	Philadelphia	0 – 3	Buffalo		Miller	18,690	Sabres lead 3–2	W
6	May 2	Buffalo	7 – 1	Philadelphia		Miller	19,967	Sabres win 4–2	W

Eastern Conference Semifinals vs. (1) Ottawa Senators – Sabres win 4–1

Game	Date	Visitor	Score	Home	OT	Decision	Attendance	Series	Recap
1	May 5	Buffalo	7 – 6	Ottawa	OT	Miller	19,544	Sabres lead 1–0	W
2	May 8	Buffalo	2 – 1	Ottawa		Miller	19,816	Sabres lead 2–0	W
3	May 10	Ottawa	2 – 3	Buffalo	OT	Miller	18,690	Sabres lead 3–0	W
4	May 11	Ottawa	2 – 1	Buffalo		Miller	18,690	Sabres lead 3–1	L
5	May 13	Buffalo	3 – 2	Ottawa	OT	Miller	20,024	Sabres win 4–1	W

Eastern Conference Finals vs. (2) Carolina Hurricanes – Hurricanes win 4–3

Game	Date	Visitor	Score	Home	OT	Decision	Attendance	Series	Recap
1	May 20	Buffalo	3 – 2	Carolina		Miller	18,730	Sabres lead 1–0	W
2	May 22	Buffalo	3 – 4	Carolina		Miller	18,730	Series tied 1–1	L
3	May 24	Carolina	3 – 4	Buffalo		Miller	18,690	Sabres lead 2–1	W
4	May 26	Carolina	4 – 0	Buffalo		Miller	18,690	Series tied 2–2	L
5	May 28	Buffalo	3 – 4	Carolina	OT	Miller	18,730	Hurricanes lead 3–2	L
6	May 30	Carolina	1 – 2	Buffalo	OT	Miller	18,690	Series tied 3–3	W
7	June 1	Buffalo	2 – 4	Carolina		Miller	18,730	Hurricanes win 4–3	L

Legend: W Win L Loss

== Player statistics ==
=== Scoring ===
- Position abbreviations: C = Center; D = Defense; G = Goaltender; LW = Left wing; RW = Right wing
- ‡ = Left team via a transaction (e.g., trade, waivers, release) during the season. Stats reflect time with the Sabres only.

No.	Player	Pos	Regular season						Playoffs					
No.	Player	Pos	GP	G	A	Pts	+/-	PIM	GP	G	A	Pts	+/-	PIM
61	Maxim Afinogenov	RW	77	22	51	73	6	84	18	3	5	8	3	10
23	Chris Drury	C	81	30	37	67	−11	32	18	9	9	18	5	10
12	Ales Kotalik	RW	82	25	37	62	−3	62	18	4	7	11	4	8
48	Daniel Briere	C	48	25	33	58	3	48	18	8	11	19	0	12
19	Tim Connolly	C	63	16	39	55	5	28	8	5	6	11	3	0
26	Thomas Vanek	LW	81	25	23	48	−11	72	10	2	0	2	−1	6
9	Derek Roy	C	70	18	28	46	1	57	18	5	10	15	7	16
51	Brian Campbell	D	79	12	32	44	−14	16	18	0	6	6	−5	12
55	Jochen Hecht	LW	64	18	24	42	10	34	15	2	6	8	4	8
17	Jean-Pierre Dumont	RW	54	20	20	40	−1	38	18	7	7	14	1	14
27	Teppo Numminen	D	75	2	38	40	6	36	12	1	1	2	3	4
29	Jason Pominville	RW	57	18	12	30	−4	22	18	5	5	10	0	8
28	Paul Gaustad	C	78	9	15	24	4	65	18	0	4	4	1	14
25	Mike Grier	RW	81	7	16	23	−7	28	18	3	5	8	3	2
10	Henrik Tallinder	D	82	6	15	21	10	74	14	2	6	8	14	16
45	Dmitri Kalinin	D	55	2	16	18	14	54	8	0	2	2	4	2
5	Toni Lydman	D	75	1	16	17	9	82	18	1	4	5	14	18
74	Jay McKee	D	75	5	11	16	0	57	17	2	3	5	3	30
24	Taylor Pyatt	LW	41	6	6	12	−1	33	14	0	5	5	−2	10
8	Rory Fitzpatrick	D	56	4	5	9	−18	50	11	0	4	4	−1	16
22	Adam Mair	C	40	2	5	7	−2	47	3	0	0	0	−2	0
13	Jiri Novotny	C	14	2	1	3	−5	0	4	0	0	0	−1	0
20	Daniel Paille	LW	14	1	2	3	5	2	—	—	—	—	—	—
30	Ryan Miller	G	48	0	2	2		0	18	0	0	0		2
38	Nathan Paetsch	D	1	0	1	1	−1	0	1	0	0	0	0	0
47	Chris Thorburn	C	2	0	1	1	−1	7	—	—	—	—	—	—
43	Martin Biron	G	35	0	1	1		10	—	—	—	—	—	—
34	Jeff Jillson	D	2	0	0	0	0	4	4	0	0	0	−4	0
35	Mika Noronen‡	G	4	0	0	0		2	—	—	—	—	—	—
76	Andrew Peters	LW	28	0	0	0	−2	100	—	—	—	—	—	—
33	Doug Janik	D	—	—	—	—	—	—	5	1	0	1	−2	2

=== Goaltending ===
- ‡ = Left team via a transaction (e.g., trade, waivers, release) during the season. Stats reflect time with the Sabres only.

No.	Player	Regular season										Playoffs								
No.	Player	GP	W	L	OT	SA	GA	GAA	SV%	SO	TOI	GP	W	L	SA	GA	GAA	SV%	SO	TOI
30	Ryan Miller	48	30	14	3	1440	124	2.60	.914	1	2861:50	18	11	7	522	48	2.56	.908	1	1123
43	Martin Biron	35	21	8	3	980	93	2.88	.905	1	1934:11	—	—	—	—	—	—	—	—	—
35	Mika Noronen‡	4	1	2	0	77	12	4.27	.844	0	168:32	—	—	—	—	—	—	—	—	—

== Awards and records ==
=== Awards ===
Type	Award/honor	Recipient	Ref
League (annual)	Jack Adams Award	Lindy Ruff	
League (in-season)	NHL Defensive Player of the Week	Ryan Miller (December 26)	
League (in-season)	NHL Defensive Player of the Week	Ryan Miller (February 6)	

=== Milestones ===
Milestone	Player	Date	Ref
First game	Thomas Vanek	October 5, 2005	
First game	Chris Thorburn	December 2, 2005	
First game	Daniel Paille	December 22, 2005	
First game	Nathan Paetsch	January 7, 2006	
First game	Jiri Novotny	January 12, 2006	

== Transactions ==
The Sabres were involved in the following transactions from February 17, 2005, the day after the 2004–05 NHL season was officially cancelled, through June 19, 2006, the day of the deciding game of the 2006 Stanley Cup Finals.

=== Trades ===
Date	Details		Ref
July 30, 2005	To Calgary Flames: 3rd-round pick in 2005	To Buffalo Sabres: 3rd-round pick in 2005; 4th-round pick in 2005	
July 30, 2005	To Washington Capitals: 6th-round pick in 2006	To Buffalo Sabres: Rights to Tim Kennedy	
August 25, 2005	To Calgary Flames: 3rd-round pick in 2006	To Buffalo Sabres: Toni Lydman	
October 4, 2005	To Chicago Blackhawks: Milan Bartovic	To Buffalo Sabres: Michael Leighton	
March 9, 2006	To Vancouver Canucks: Mika Noronen	To Buffalo Sabres: 2nd-round pick in 2006	

=== Players acquired ===
Date	Player	Former team	Term	Via	Ref
August 4, 2005	Teppo Numminen	Dallas Stars	1-year	Free agency	

=== Players lost ===
Date	Player	New team	Via (Note: In parentheses is the player's free agency group on August 1 if applicable.)	Ref
February 24, 2005	Jason Botterill		Retirement (UFA)	
August 3, 2005	Miroslav Satan	New York Islanders	Free agency (UFA)	
August 8, 2005	Eric Boulton	Atlanta Thrashers	Free agency (UFA)	
August 18, 2005	Norm Milley	Tampa Bay Lightning	Free agency (VI)	
August 31, 2005	Brandon Smith	Rochester Americans (AHL)	Free agency (VI)	
September 7, 2005	Todd Rohloff	Tampa Bay Lightning	Free agency (UFA)	
September 10, 2005	Brad Brown	Toronto Maple Leafs	Free agency (UFA)	
September 21, 2005	Tom Askey	HIFK (Liiga)	Free agency (VI)	
October 13, 2005	Ryan Jorde	Danbury Trashers (UHL)	Free agency (UFA)	

=== Signings ===
Date	Player	Term	Contract type	Ref
July 28, 2005	Clarke MacArthur	3-year	Entry-level	
July 29, 2005	Rory Fitzpatrick	1-year	Option exercised	
July 29, 2005	Dmitri Kalinin	1-year	Option exercised	
August 4, 2005	Taylor Pyatt	1-year	Re-signing	
August 8, 2005	Mike Grier	1-year	Re-signing	
August 12, 2005	Martin Biron	1-year	Re-signing	
August 12, 2005	Brian Campbell	1-year	Re-signing	
August 12, 2005	Ryan Miller	1-year	Re-signing	
August 15, 2005	Maxim Afinogenov	1-year	Re-signing	
August 15, 2005	Milan Bartovic	1-year	Re-signing	
August 15, 2005	Daniel Briere	1-year	Re-signing	
August 15, 2005	Tim Connolly	1-year	Re-signing	
August 15, 2005	Jean-Pierre Dumont	1-year	Re-signing	
August 15, 2005	Paul Gaustad	1-year	Re-signing	
August 15, 2005	Jochen Hecht	3-year	Re-signing	
August 15, 2005	Jeff Jillson	1-year	Re-signing	
August 15, 2005	Ales Kotalik	1-year	Re-signing	
August 15, 2005	Jason Pominville	1-year	Re-signing	
August 15, 2005	Michael Ryan	1-year	Re-signing	
August 15, 2005	Henrik Tallinder	1-year	Re-signing	
September 9, 2005	Jay McKee	1-year	Re-signing	
September 14, 2005	Sean McMorrow		Re-signing	
October 11, 2005	Mark Mancari	3-year	Entry-level	
May 3, 2006	Drew Stafford	3-year	Entry-level	
June 5, 2006	Mike Card	multi-year	Entry-level	
June 5, 2006	Michael Funk	multi-year	Entry-level	
June 5, 2006	Dylan Hunter	multi-year	Entry-level	
June 5, 2006	Patrick Kaleta	multi-year	Entry-level	

== Draft picks ==
As there was no 2004–05 season to set the order for the draft, a lottery was held in which teams were assigned a number of balls, between one and three, based on the number of playoff appearances the team had had in the past three seasons. As the Sabres had missed the playoffs three consecutive seasons, they were one of only four teams which had the full allotment of three balls in the lottery. Despite this advantage, the Sabres only ended up with the 13th overall pick.

Buffalo's picks at the 2005 NHL entry draft in Ottawa, Ontario:

Round	#	Player	Nationality	NHL team	College/junior/club team (league)
1	13	Marek Zagrapan (C)	Slovakia	Buffalo Sabres	Chicoutimi Saguenéens (QMJHL)
2	48	Philipp Gogulla (W)	Germany	Buffalo Sabres	Kolner Haie (DEL)
3	87	Marc-Andre Gragnani (D)	Canada	Buffalo Sabres (from Calgary Flames)	P.E.I. Rocket (QMJHL)
4	96	Chris Butler (D)	United States	Buffalo Sabres (from Calgary Flames)	Sioux City Musketeers (USHL)
5	142	Nathan Gerbe (C)	United States	Buffalo Sabres	US National Team Development Program
6	182	Adam Dennis (G)	Canada	Buffalo Sabres	London Knights (OHL)
6	191	Vyacheslav Buravchikov (D)	Russia	Buffalo Sabres (from Minnesota Wild)	Krylia (Russia 2)
7	208	Matt Generous (D)	United States	Buffalo Sabres	New England Junior Falcons (EJHL)
7	227	Andrew Orpik (D)	United States	Buffalo Sabres	Thayer Academy (USHS)

== See also ==
- 2005–06 NHL season
