= Mikael Tellqvist =

Swedish ice hockey player

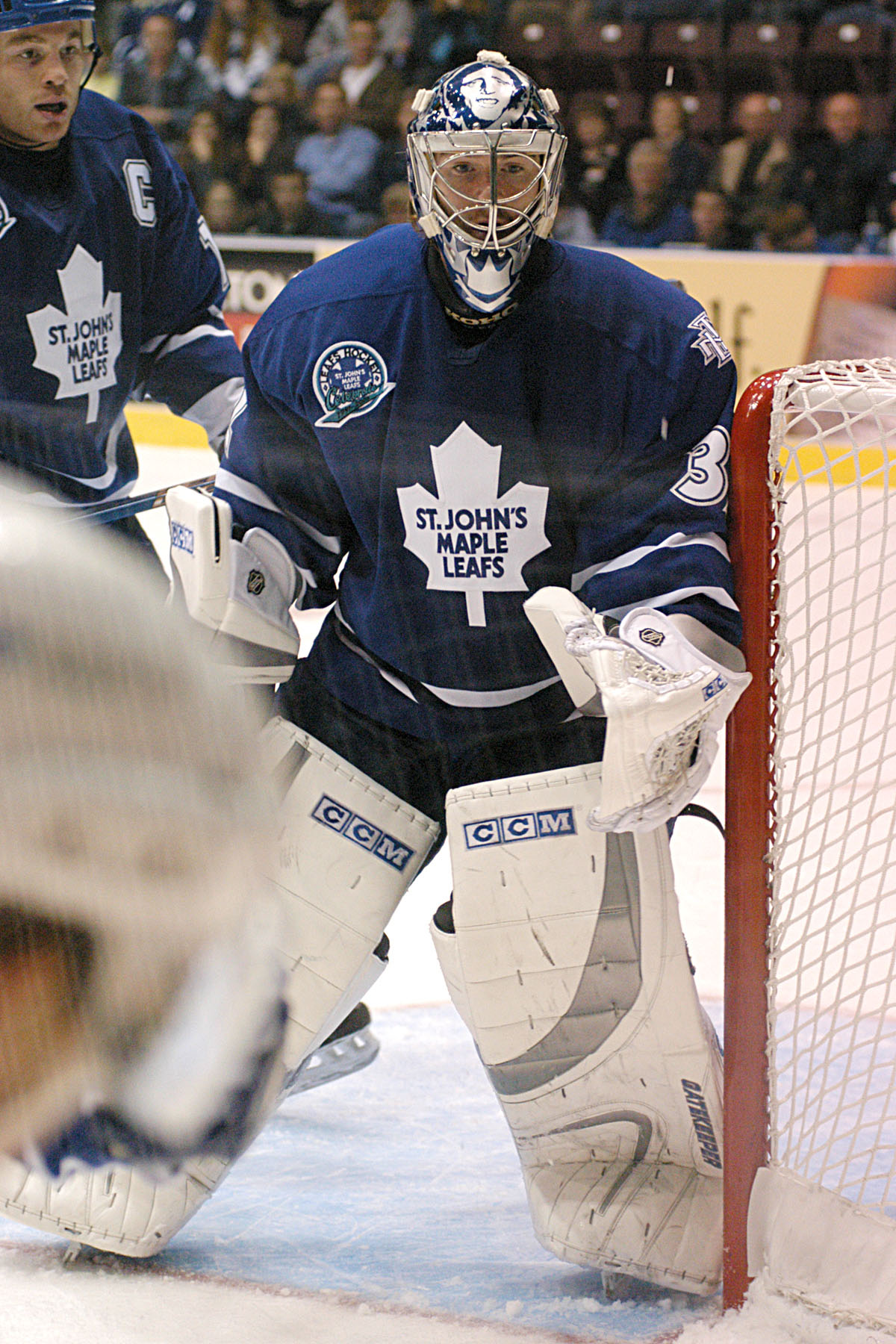
- Tellqvist with the St. John's Maple Leafs in 2004
- Born: 19 September 1979 (age 47) Sundbyberg, Sweden
- Height: 5 ft 11 in (180 cm)
- Weight: 185 lb (84 kg; 13 st 3 lb)
- Position: Goaltender
- Caught: Left
- Played for: SEL; Modo Hockey; Djurgårdens IF; SM-liiga; Lukko; NHL; Toronto Maple Leafs; Phoenix Coyotes; Buffalo Sabres; KHL; Ak Bars Kazan; Dinamo Riga
- National team: Sweden
- NHL draft: 70th overall, 2000; Toronto Maple Leafs
- Playing career: 1998–2017

Medal record

Representing Sweden

Ice hockey

Olympic Games
Gold medal – first place	2006 Turin	

World Championships
Silver medal – second place	2003 Helsinki	
Bronze medal – third place	2001 Cologne/Hanover	

Mikael Karl Tellqvist (born 19 September 1979) is a Swedish former professional ice hockey goaltender who last played for Djurgårdens IF of the Swedish Hockey League, his second tenure with the club.

== Playing career ==
Tellqvist was drafted 70th overall by the Toronto Maple Leafs in the 2000 NHL entry draft. He had played a total of 14 games for the Leafs before the 2005–06 season, spending most of his time with their then American Hockey League (AHL) affiliate, the St. John's Maple Leafs.

In 2003, Tellqvist played in the world hockey championship. Here is where he represented Sweden. During this time he recorded a 1.37 goals against average and a .940 save percentage. But unfortunately the run came to an end when they played Canada in the finals. They would lose and capture silver.

At the end of the 2005–06 season, when starting Maple Leafs goaltender Ed Belfour was injured, Tellqvist played in two consecutive games against the Montreal Canadiens when the Leafs were struggling to make the playoffs near the end of the season. He struggled in those games, letting in 11 total goals. Following the second game, he was replaced by Toronto's third-string goaltender, Jean-Sébastien Aubin.

On November 28, 2006, Tellqvist was traded to the Phoenix Coyotes in exchange for forward Tyson Nash and a fourth-round draft pick in 2007 NHL entry draft. Later in the season, on February 16, 2007, the Coyotes signed him to a contract extension through to the 2007–08 season. On March 12, 2007, in a game against the Philadelphia Flyers, he stopped all 24 shots to record his fourth career NHL shutout. On April 3, 2007, he set a new career high in wins with 11.

For the 2007–08 season, Tellqvist competed for Phoenix's starting goaltender position with Alex Auld and David Aebischer. Aebischer was eventually waived, setting up the tandem of Tellqvist and Auld. Upon the acquisition of Ilya Bryzgalov via waivers from the Anaheim Ducks, Auld was eventually traded to the Boston Bruins; Tellqvist became the back-up behind Bryzgalov.

On March 4, 2009, Tellqvist was traded by the Coyotes to the Buffalo Sabres in exchange for a fourth-round draft pick in 2010. On May 1, 2009, Tellqvist signed with Ak Bars Kazan of the Kontinental Hockey League (KHL) for the 2009–10 season.

On November 19, 2009, Tellqvist was traded to Lukko in the Finnish SM-liiga. Lukko was at the time leading the League by 18 points, and is one of the leading candidates for the championship.

On August 4, 2010, it was announced that Tellqvist has signed with Dinamo Riga of the KHL for the 2010–11 season.

On November 2, 2017, Tellqvist officially announced his retirement as a player.

== Career statistics ==
=== Regular season and playoffs ===
			Regular season										Playoffs
Season	Team	League	GP	W	L	T	OTL	MIN	GA	SO	GAA	SV%	GP	W	L	MIN	GA	SO	GAA	SV%
1997–98	Djurgårdens IF J20	SWE-Jr	23	—	—	—	—	1380	55	—	2.39	.912	2	0	2	120	8	0	4.00	—
1998–99	Djurgårdens IF	SWE	3	1	2	0	—	124	8	0	3.87	.860	4	—	—	240	11	0	2.75	—
1999–00	Djurgårdens IF	SWE	30	—	—	—	—	1909	66	2	3.87	.913	13	—	—	814	21	3	1.54	.931
1999–00	Huddinge IK	SWE-2	11	4	7	0	—	660	33	—	3.30	.882	—	—	—	—	—	—	—	—
2000–01	Djurgårdens IF	SWE	43	—	—	—	—	2622	91	5	2.08	.914	16	—	—	1006	45	1	2.68	.882
2001–02	St. John's Maple Leafs	AHL	28	8	11	6	—	1521	79	0	3.12	.909	1	1	0	15	0	0	0.00	1.000
2002–03	St. John's Maple Leafs	AHL	47	17	25	3	—	2651	148	1	3.35	.910	—	—	—	—	—	—	—	—
2002–03	Toronto Maple Leafs	NHL	3	1	1	0	—	86	4	0	2.79	.895	—	—	—	—	—	—	—	—
2003–04	Toronto Maple Leafs	NHL	12	5	3	2	—	647	31	0	2.87	.894	—	—	—	—	—	—	—	—
2003–04	St. John's Maple Leafs	AHL	23	10	11	1	—	1343	59	1	2.64	.921	—	—	—	—	—	—	—	—
2004–05	St. John's Maple Leafs	AHL	45	24	16	4	—	2599	115	0	2.65	.921	5	1	4	253	15	0	3.56	.899
2005–06	Toronto Maple Leafs	NHL	25	10	11	—	2	1398	73	2	3.13	.895	—	—	—	—	—	—	—	—
2006–07	Toronto Maple Leafs	NHL	1	0	1	—	0	59	2	0	2.03	.895	—	—	—	—	—	—	—	—
2006–07	Toronto Marlies	AHL	3	2	1	—	0	182	12	0	3.95	.882	—	—	—	—	—	—	—	—
2006–07	Phoenix Coyotes	NHL	28	11	11	—	3	1591	90	2	3.39	.885	—	—	—	—	—	—	—	—
2007–08	Phoenix Coyotes	NHL	22	9	8	—	2	1224	56	2	2.75	.908	—	—	—	—	—	—	—	—
2008–09	Phoenix Coyotes	NHL	15	7	5	—	1	797	38	0	2.86	.907	—	—	—	—	—	—	—	—
2008–09	Buffalo Sabres	NHL	6	2	1	—	0	229	9	0	2.35	.928	—	—	—	—	—	—	—	—
2009–10	Lukko	FIN	26	11	10	5	—	1588	62	0	2.34	.919	4	0	4	236	12	0	3.05	.914
2009–10	Ak-Bars Kazan	KHL	11	5	3	0	—	589	24	0	2.44	.905	—	—	—	—	—	—	—	—
2010–11	Dinamo Riga	KHL	20	8	9	1	—	1140	50	1	2.63	.922	6	—	—	296	15	0	3.04	.904
2011–12	Modo Hockey	SWE	45	—	—	—	—	2579	102	2	2.37	.924	6	—	—	361	12	1	1.99	.946
2012–13	Dinamo Riga	KHL	35	12	19	1	—	1972	86	1	2.62	.909	—	—	—	—	—	—	—	—
2013–14	Dinamo Riga	KHL	39	21	11	7	—	2326	72	3	1.86	.929	3	0	2	147	9	0	3.67	.871
2014–15	Djurgårdens IF	SWE	39	17	21	0	—	2272	97	1	2.56	.915	2	0	2	117	4	0	2.05	.933
2015–16	Djurgårdens IF	SWE	20	12	8	0	—	1156	44	1	2.28	.919	5	—	—	334	17	0	3.06	.904
2016–17	Djurgårdens IF	SWE	32	12	19	0	—	1801	72	1	2.40	.902	1	—	—	—	0	0	0.00	1.000
NHL totals			113	45	41	2	8	6034	303	6	3.01	.898	—	—	—	—	—	—	—	—
