= Ben Ondrus =

Canadian ice hockey player (born 1982)

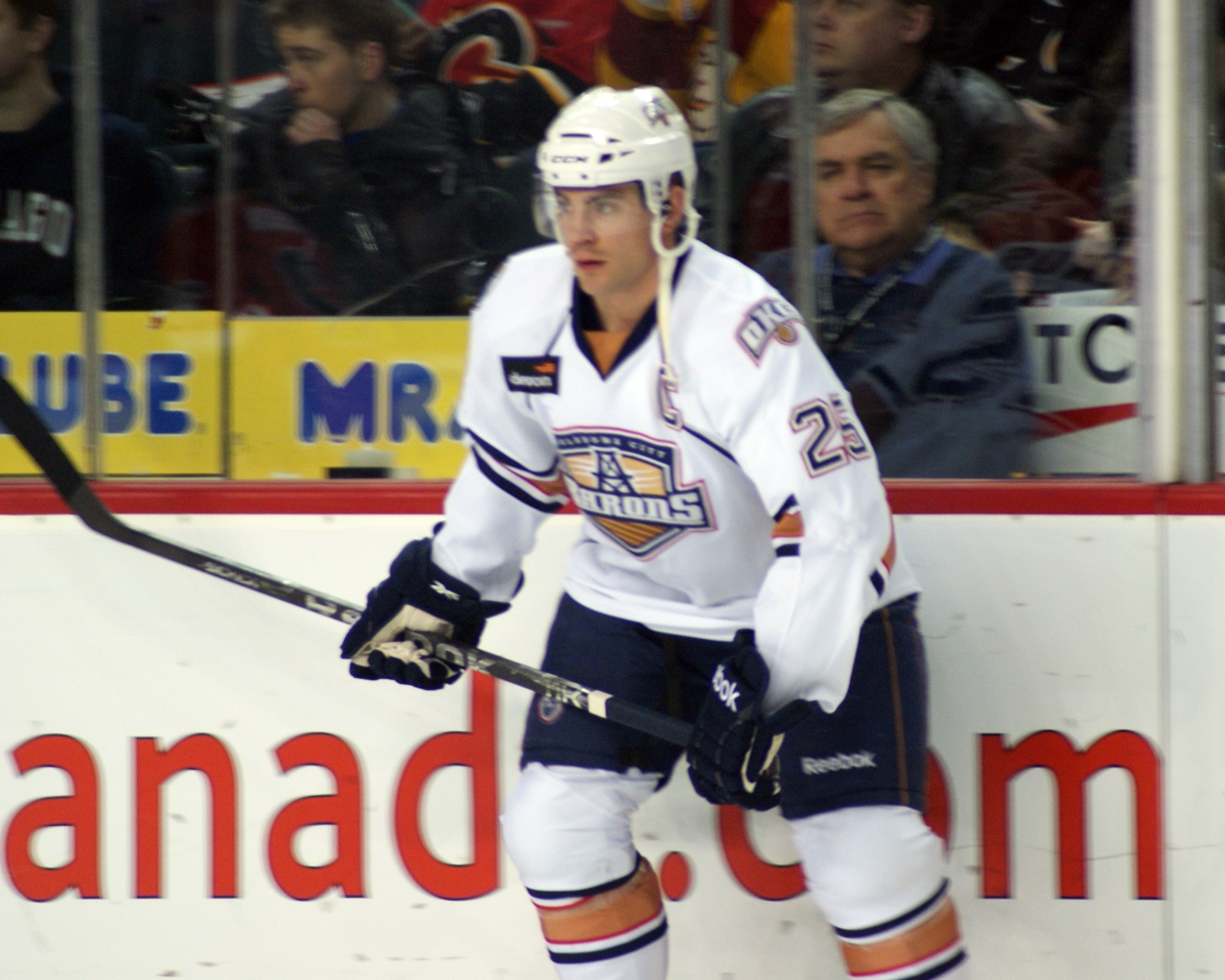
- 2010–11 Oklahoma City Barons
- Born: June 25, 1982 (age 44) Sherwood Park, Alberta, Canada
- Height: 5 ft 11 in (180 cm)
- Weight: 208 lb (94 kg; 14 st 12 lb)
- Position: Right wing
- Shot: Right
- Played for: Toronto Maple Leafs; Krefeld Pinguine; Toronto Marlies; Oklahoma City Barons; Idaho Steelheads
- NHL draft: Undrafted
- Playing career: 2003–2013

Benjamin Matthew Ondrus (born June 25, 1982) is a Canadian former professional ice hockey player. Ondrus was never drafted by a National Hockey League (NHL) team, however, he signed as a free agent and worked his way up through the Toronto Maple Leafs system, making his NHL debut in 2006. Ondrus played junior hockey in the Western Hockey League for the Swift Current Broncos. While playing in the American Hockey League for the Toronto Marlies, Ondrus served as team captain.

== Playing career ==
Ondrus was the former captain of the Swift Current Broncos, where he was a junior teammate with fellow former Toronto Maple Leafs' prospects Ian White, Wilson McCutchan and Jeremy Williams. He was signed to an American Hockey League (AHL) contract after a fine performance at the Leafs' 2003 rookie camp and earned a contract with Toronto following an encouraging rookie AHL season with the St. John's Maple Leafs in 2003–04. Ondrus made his NHL debut on March 7, 2006, in a game against the Montreal Canadiens.

During his time in Toronto, Ondrus served as the team captain of the Toronto Marlies, the Maple Leafs' AHL affiliates.

On July 9, 2010, he signed as a free agent to a one-year contract with the Edmonton Oilers. Ondrus scored his first ever goal in an Oilers uniform on September 22, as the Oilers defeated Northwest division rivals, the Vancouver Canucks, in a pre-season warm-up at the recently renamed Rogers Arena, in Vancouver.

After a year abroad in Germany with Krefeld Pinguine of the Deutsche Eishockey Liga, Ondrus returned to North America signing as a free agent to a one-year contract with the Idaho Steelheads of the ECHL on September 12, 2012.

== Career statistics ==
			Regular season					Playoffs
Season	Team	League	GP	G	A	Pts	PIM	GP	G	A	Pts	PIM
1998–99	Swift Current Broncos	WHL	46	4	4	8	58	6	0	1	1	8
1999–2000	Swift Current Broncos	WHL	67	14	15	29	138	12	1	0	1	22
2000–01	Swift Current Broncos	WHL	69	13	17	30	151	19	2	3	5	46
2001–02	Swift Current Broncos	WHL	67	30	41	71	153	12	4	3	7	18
2002–03	Swift Current Broncos	WHL	67	33	36	69	98	3	0	1	1	11
2002–03	Idaho Steelheads	WCHL	4	0	3	3	0	5	0	1	1	6
2003–04	St. John's Maple Leafs	AHL	60	6	11	17	102	—	—	—	—	—
2004–05	St. John's Maple Leafs	AHL	78	7	11	18	137	5	0	1	1	7
2005–06	Toronto Marlies	AHL	53	12	18	30	104	5	1	2	3	4
2005–06	Toronto Maple Leafs	NHL	22	0	0	0	18	—	—	—	—	—
2006–07	Toronto Marlies	AHL	29	8	3	11	35	—	—	—	—	—
2006–07	Toronto Maple Leafs	NHL	16	0	2	2	20	—	—	—	—	—
2007–08	Toronto Marlies	AHL	59	14	12	26	63	19	1	5	6	14
2007–08	Toronto Maple Leafs	NHL	3	0	0	0	5	—	—	—	—	—
2008–09	Toronto Marlies	AHL	57	10	7	17	83	6	0	0	0	2
2008–09	Toronto Maple Leafs	NHL	11	0	0	0	34	—	—	—	—	—
2009–10	Toronto Marlies	AHL	56	7	7	14	41	—	—	—	—	—
2010–11	Oklahoma City Barons	AHL	80	8	14	22	72	6	1	1	2	0
2011–12	Krefeld Pinguine	DEL	47	3	7	10	64	—	—	—	—	—
2012–13	Idaho Steelheads	ECHL	55	7	15	22	62	17	2	3	5	22
NHL totals			52	0	2	2	77	—	—	—	—	—
