= Mike Hoffman (ice hockey, born 1980) =

American ice hockey player (born 1980)

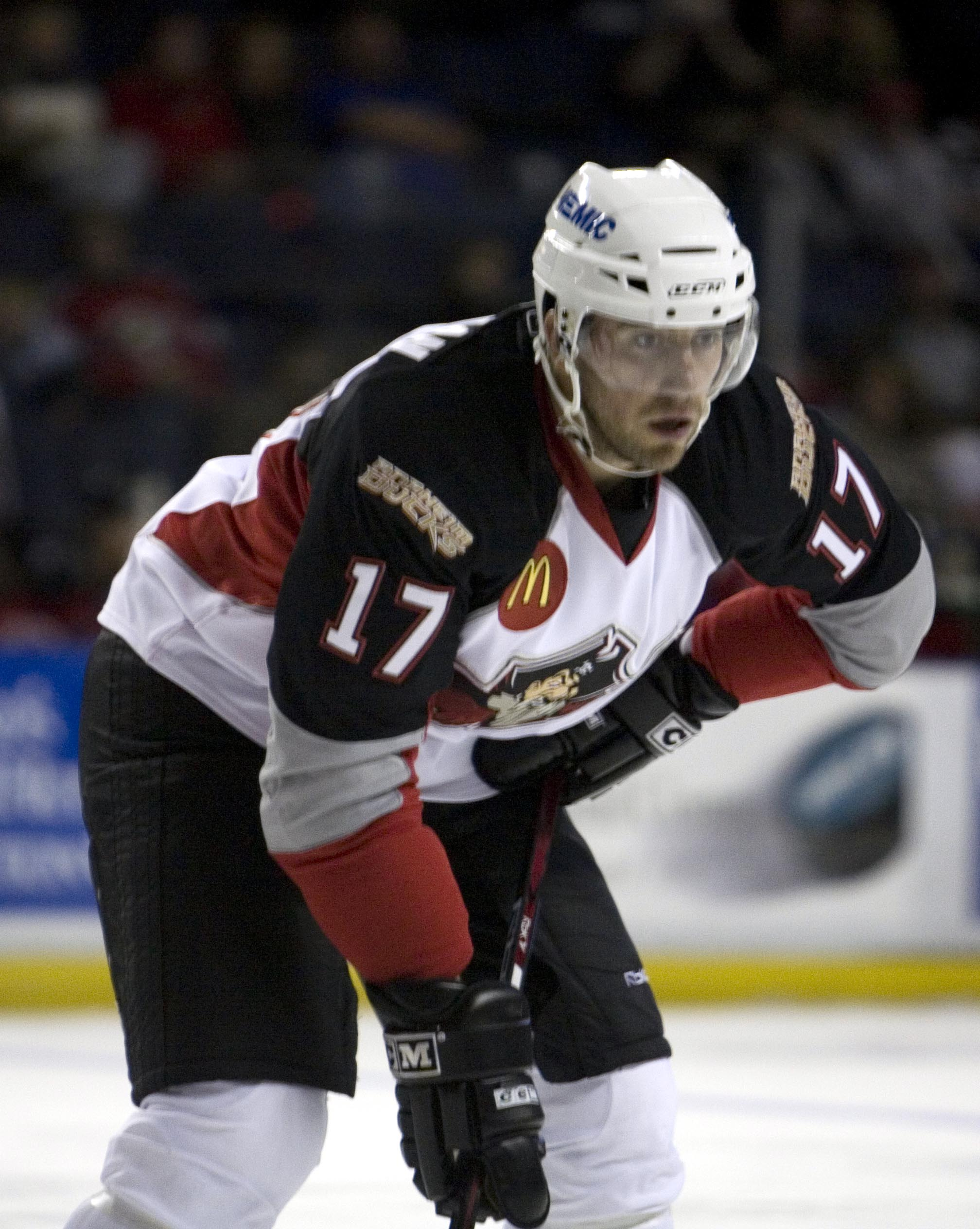
- Hoffman with the Portland Pirates in 2007
- Born: September 20, 1980 (age 45) Scituate, Massachusetts, U.S.
- Height: 6 ft 5 in (196 cm)
- Weight: 250 lb (113 kg; 17 st 12 lb)
- Position: Right wing
- Shot: Right
- Played for: Worcester IceCats; Cleveland Barons; Toronto Marlies; Manchester Monarchs; Portland Pirates; Chicago Wolves; Hartford Wolf Pack; Belfast Giants; HYS The Hague
- NHL draft: Undrafted
- Playing career: 2003–2013

Mike Hoffman (born September 20, 1980) is an American former professional ice hockey player. After leaving the University of Connecticut in 2003, he began his professional career with the Worcester IceCats of the American Hockey League (AHL) and the Peoria Rivermen of the ECHL. He signed a contract with the Toronto Maple Leafs in 2005, but he has never played in the National Hockey League.

During the 2010–11 and 2011–12 seasons, he played for the Belfast Giants of the Elite Ice Hockey League (EIHL) in Europe.
