= Jean-Sébastien Aubin =

Canadian ice hockey player (born 1977)

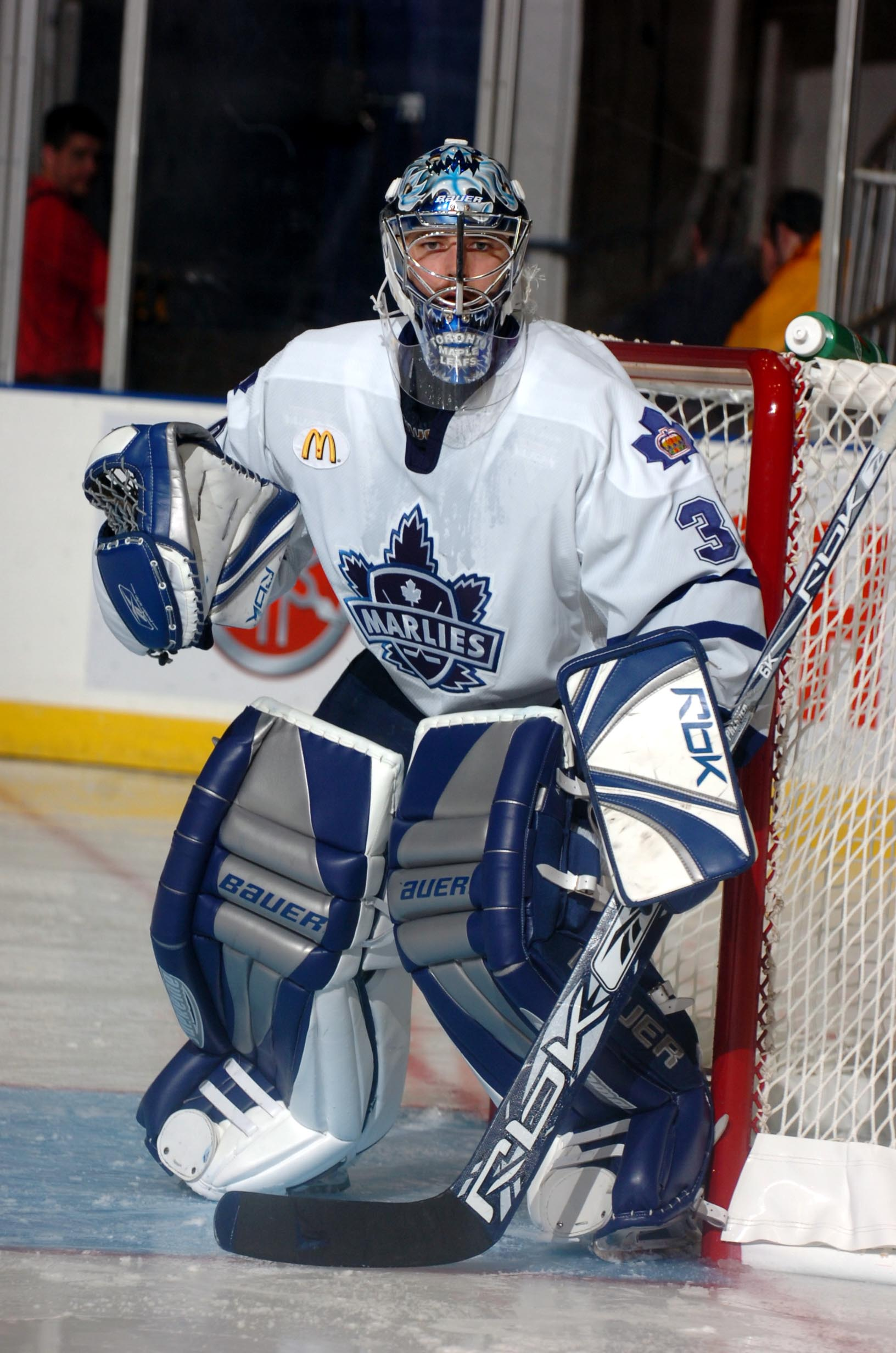
- Aubin with the Toronto Marlies in 2005
- Born: July 19, 1977 (age 49) Montreal, Quebec, Canada
- Height: 5 ft 11 in (180 cm)
- Weight: 180 lb (82 kg; 12 st 12 lb)
- Position: Goaltender
- Caught: Right
- Played for: Pittsburgh Penguins; Toronto Maple Leafs; Los Angeles Kings; DEG Metro Stars; Pustertal-Val Pusteria Wolves; Ducs d'Angers
- NHL draft: 76th overall, 1995; Pittsburgh Penguins
- Playing career: 1997–2015

Jean-Sébastien Aubin (born July 19, 1977) is a Canadian former professional ice hockey goaltender who played in the National Hockey League (NHL) with the Pittsburgh Penguins, Toronto Maple Leafs and the Los Angeles Kings.

== Playing career ==
Aubin was born in Montreal, Quebec. As a youth, he played in the 1990 Quebec International Pee-Wee Hockey Tournament with a minor ice hockey team from Mercier, Quebec.

Aubin played his junior career in the Quebec Major Junior Hockey League, following in the footsteps of so many other Quebec-born goaltenders. He played for three different teams, spending the most time with the Sherbrooke Faucons. He was drafted in the third round of the 1995 NHL entry draft, 76th overall, by the Pittsburgh Penguins. His professional career began in the East Coast Hockey League, but he worked his way on to the Penguins' farm team, and then into the NHL itself.

In the 1998–99 season, Aubin was recalled by the Penguins and made his NHL debut in a 5-0 defeat to the Tampa Bay Lightning on October 21, 1998. Two weeks later Aubin recorded his first career win on November 5, in a 4-2 victory over the Ottawa Senators. In his next start Aubin continued his good form, collecting his first career shutout in a scoreless tie against the Boston Bruins on November 7, 1998.

Aubin played parts of six seasons with Pittsburgh, including one as their starting goaltender, before being released by them. He then signed a two-way contract with the Toronto Maple Leafs. He played his first game with the Maple Leafs on March 26, 2006 versus the New Jersey Devils, making 36 saves and winning the game 4–3. He recorded a shutout in only his third game with the Maple Leafs, against the Buffalo Sabres in a 7–0 victory on home ice.

After spending the majority of the 2007–08 season with the Los Angeles Kings, he was traded to the Anaheim Ducks at the 2008 trading deadline for a seventh round pick. It was the first-ever transaction involving the two geographic- and Pacific Division-rival clubs. On July 23, 2009, Aubin signed a one-year contract with European team, the DEG Metro Stars leaving the Philadelphia Phantoms.

In his first season with the Metro Stars in 2009–10, Aubin recorded the best save percentage and was subsequently selected as the DEL Goalie of the Year.

After three seasons with the Metro Stars, Aubin departed as a free agent but remained in Europe, signing a one-year contract with Pustertal-Val Pusteria Wolves of the Italian Serie A on June 3, 2012.

== Career statistics ==
| | | | Regular season | | | | | | | | | Playoffs |
| Season | Team | League | GP | W | L | T/OT | MIN | GA | SO | GAA | SV% | GP | W | L | MIN | GA | SO | GAA | SV% |
|---|---|---|---|---|---|---|---|---|---|---|---|---|---|---|---|---|---|---|---|
| 1994–95 | Sherbrooke Faucons | QMJHL | 27 | 13 | 10 | 1 | 1287 | 73 | 1 | 3.34 | .888 | 3 | 1 | 2 | 186 | 11 | 0 | 3.55 | .891 |
| 1995–96 | Sherbrooke Faucons | QMJHL | 40 | 18 | 14 | 2 | 2140 | 127 | 0 | 3.56 | .887 | 4 | 1 | 3 | 174 | 16 | 0 | 5.50 | .850 |
| 1996–97 | Sherbrooke Faucons | QMJHL | 4 | 3 | 1 | 0 | 249 | 8 | 0 | 1.93 | .930 | — | — | — | — | — | — | — | — |
| 1996–97 | Moncton Wildcats | QMJHL | 23 | 9 | 13 | 0 | 1311 | 72 | 1 | 3.30 | 915 | — | — | — | — | — | — | — | — |
| 1996–97 | Laval Titan Collège Français | QMJHL | 11 | 2 | 6 | 1 | 532 | 41 | 0 | 4.62 | .889 | 2 | 0 | 2 | 128 | 10 | 0 | 4.69 | .872 |
| 1997–98 | Dayton Bombers | ECHL | 21 | 15 | 2 | 2 | 1177 | 59 | 1 | 3.01 | .911 | 3 | 1 | 1 | 142 | 4 | 0 | 1.69 | .932 |
| 1997–98 | Syracuse Crunch | AHL | 8 | 2 | 4 | 1 | 380 | 26 | 0 | 4.11 | .855 | — | — | — | — | — | — | — | — |
| 1998–99 | Pittsburgh Penguins | NHL | 17 | 4 | 3 | 6 | 756 | 28 | 2 | 2.22 | .903 | — | — | — | — | — | — | — | — |
| 1998–99 | Kansas City Blades | IHL | 13 | 5 | 7 | 1 | 751 | 41 | 0 | 3.28 | .900 | — | — | — | — | — | — | — | — |
| 1999–00 | Pittsburgh Penguins | NHL | 51 | 23 | 21 | 3 | 2789 | 120 | 2 | 2.58 | .914 | — | — | — | — | — | — | — | — |
| 1999–00 | Wilkes-Barre/Scranton Penguins | AHL | 11 | 2 | 8 | 0 | 538 | 39 | 0 | 4.35 | .870 | — | — | — | — | — | — | — | — |
| 2000–01 | Pittsburgh Penguins | NHL | 36 | 20 | 14 | 1 | 2050 | 107 | 0 | 3.13 | .890 | 1 | 0 | 0 | 1 | 0 | 0 | 0.00 | — |
| 2001–02 | Pittsburgh Penguins | NHL | 21 | 3 | 12 | 1 | 1094 | 65 | 0 | 3.56 | .879 | — | — | — | — | — | — | — | — |
| 2002–03 | Pittsburgh Penguins | NHL | 21 | 6 | 13 | 0 | 1132 | 59 | 1 | 3.13 | .900 | — | — | — | — | — | — | — | — |
| 2002–03 | Wilkes-Barre/Scranton Penguins | AHL | 16 | 8 | 6 | 1 | 919 | 29 | 3 | 1.89 | .937 | 6 | 3 | 3 | 356 | 12 | 0 | 2.02 | .930 |
| 2003–04 | Wilkes-Barre/Scranton Penguins | AHL | 13 | 4 | 5 | 2 | 670 | 31 | 0 | 2.78 | .901 | — | — | — | — | — | — | — | — |
| 2003–04 | Pittsburgh Penguins | NHL | 22 | 7 | 9 | 0 | 1067 | 53 | 1 | 2.98 | .908 | — | — | — | — | — | — | — | — |
| 2004–05 | St. John's Maple Leafs | AHL | 23 | 12 | 9 | 0 | 1335 | 64 | 3 | 2.88 | .921 | 1 | 0 | 0 | 47 | 1 | 0 | 1.28 | .957 |
| 2005–06 | Toronto Marlies | AHL | 46 | 19 | 18 | 2 | 2491 | 126 | 2 | 3.03 | .899 | 5 | 1 | 4 | 359 | 17 | 0 | 2.84 | .917 |
| 2005–06 | Toronto Maple Leafs | NHL | 11 | 9 | 0 | 2 | 677 | 25 | 1 | 2.22 | .924 | — | — | — | — | — | — | — | — |
| 2006–07 | Toronto Maple Leafs | NHL | 20 | 3 | 5 | 2 | 804 | 46 | 0 | 3.43 | .876 | — | — | — | — | — | — | — | — |
| 2007–08 | Los Angeles Kings | NHL | 19 | 5 | 6 | 1 | 828 | 44 | 0 | 3.19 | .886 | — | — | — | — | — | — | — | — |
| 2007–08 | Manchester Monarchs | AHL | 1 | 0 | 0 | 0 | 9 | 4 | 0 | 27.69 | .429 | — | — | — | — | — | — | — | — |
| 2007–08 | Portland Pirates | AHL | 11 | 6 | 4 | 0 | 645 | 18 | 3 | 1.67 | .938 | 12 | 9 | 3 | 757 | 29 | 0 | 2.30 | .919 |
| 2008–09 | Philadelphia Phantoms | AHL | 23 | 10 | 10 | 1 | 1252 | 70 | 0 | 3.35 | .896 | 1 | 0 | 1 | 58 | 1 | 0 | 1.03 | .967 |
| 2009–10 | DEG Metro Stars | DEL | 54 | 23 | 20 | 0 | 3179 | 130 | 2 | 2.45 | .922 | 3 | 0 | 3 | 174 | 11 | 0 | 3.79 | .855 |
| 2010–11 | DEG Metro Stars | DEL | 48 | 29 | 16 | 0 | 2739 | 128 | 4 | 2.80 | .900 | 9 | 5 | 4 | 533 | 25 | 1 | 2.81 | .914 |
| 2011–12 | DEG Metro Stars | DEL | 16 | 2 | 11 | 0 | 832 | 50 | 0 | 3.61 | .880 | 2 | 0 | 2 | 129 | 9 | 0 | 4.19 | .870 |
| 2012–13 | HC Pustertal Wölfe | ITL | 30 | 23 | 5 | 1 | 1728 | 57 | 1 | 1.98 | .926 | 10 | — | — | — | — | — | 3.01 | .898 |
| 2013–14 | HC Pustertal Wölfe | ITL | 34 | 20 | 13 | 0 | 1962 | 79 | 4 | 2.42 | .933 | 16 | — | — | — | — | — | 2.09 | .947 |
| 2014–15 | Ducs d'Angers | FRA | 22 | 12 | 4 | 4 | 1291 | 51 | 2 | 2.37 | .924 | 10 | — | — | — | — | — | 2.39 | .918 |
| NHL totals | | | 218 | 80 | 83 | 16 | 11,197 | 547 | 7 | 2.93 | .900 | 1 | 0 | 0 | 1 | 0 | 0 | 0.00 | — |

== Transactions ==
- On July 8, 1995 the Pittsburgh Penguins selected Jean-Sébastien Aubin in the third-round (#76 overall) of the 1995 NHL draft.
- On September 24, 2000 the Pittsburgh Penguins re-signed restricted free agent Jean-Sébastien Aubin.
- On July 31, 2001 the Pittsburgh Penguins re-signed Jean-Sébastien Aubin.
- On June 25, 2002 the Pittsburgh Penguins re-signed Jean-Sébastien Aubin.
- On August 18, 2005 the Toronto Maple Leafs signed unrestricted free agent Jean-Sébastien Aubin to a 1-year contract.
- On April 12, 2006 the Toronto Maple Leafs re-signed Jean-Sébastien Aubin to a 1-year contract.
- On August 28, 2007 the Los Angeles Kings signed unrestricted free agent Jean-Sébastien Aubin to a 1-year contract.
- On February 26, 2008 the Los Angeles Kings traded Jean-Sébastien Aubin to the Anaheim Ducks in exchange for a 2008 seventh-round pick (#185-Paul Karpowich).
- On September 18, 2008 the Philadelphia Flyers signed unrestricted free agent Jean-Sébastien Aubin to a 1-year contract.
- On July 23, 2009 the Düsseldorfer EG Metro Stars (DEL) signed Jean-Sébastien Aubin.
