= Jeremy Williams (ice hockey) =

Canadian ice hockey centre

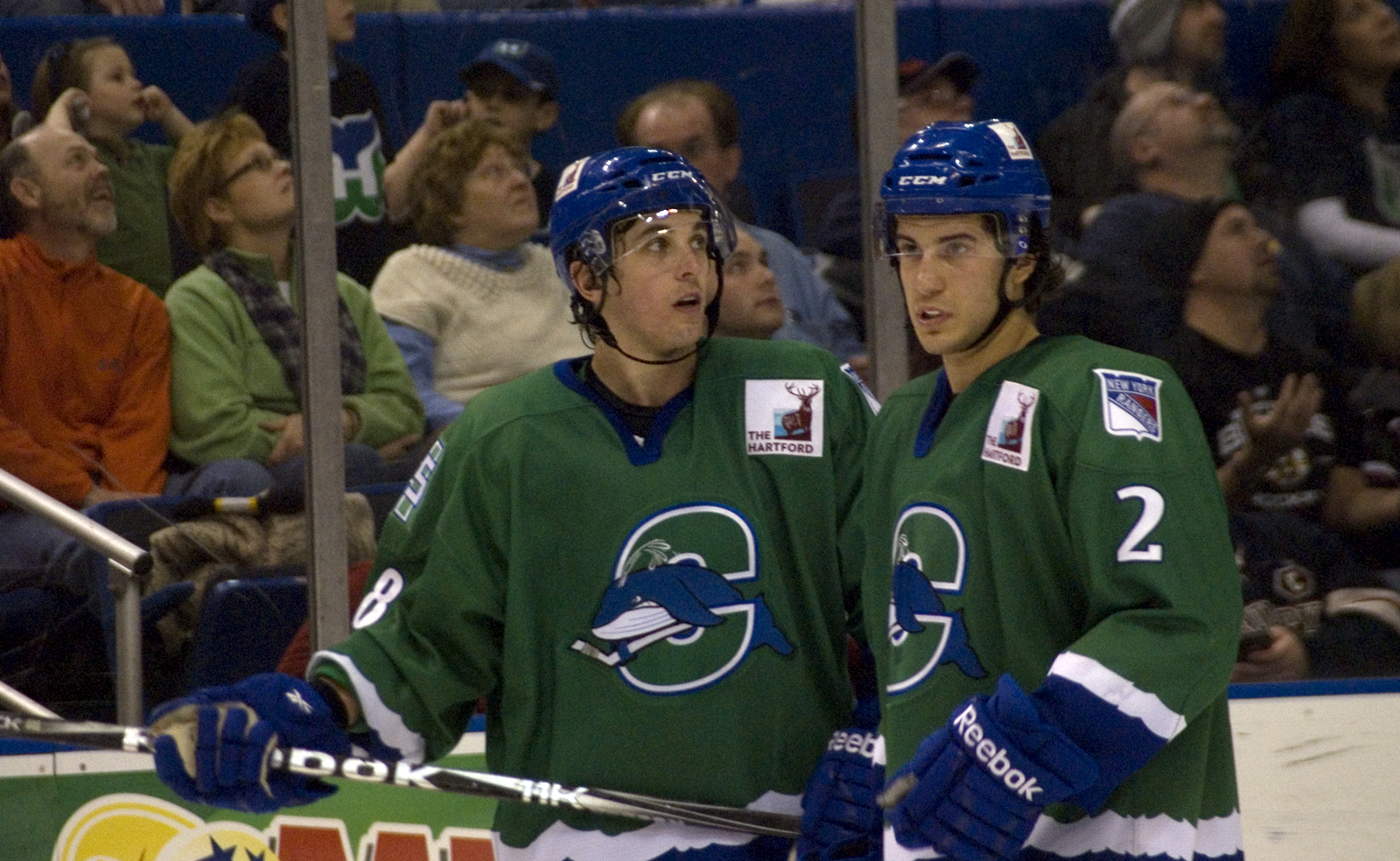
- Williams in 2011, playing for Connecticut Whale
- Born: January 26, 1984 (age 42) Montmartre, Saskatchewan, Canada
- Height: 6 ft 0 in (183 cm)
- Weight: 194 lb (88 kg; 13 st 12 lb)
- Position: Centre
- Shot: Right
- DEL2 team Former teams: Heilbronner Falken; Toronto Maple Leafs; New York Rangers; EC Red Bull Salzburg; HC Sierre; Straubing Tigers; Örebro HK
- NHL draft: 220th overall, 2003; Toronto Maple Leafs
- Playing career: 2005–2023

Jeremy Williams (born January 26, 1984) is a Canadian former professional ice hockey centre who last played for Heilbronner Falken of the DEL2.

== Playing career ==
Williams was drafted by the Toronto Maple Leafs 220th overall in the 2003 NHL entry draft.

Williams scored a goal in each of his first three games in the NHL, with each game coming in a different season — he is likely the only player to achieve the odd feat. His NHL debut came on April 18, 2006, versus the Pittsburgh Penguins, which was the Leafs' last game of the season. He scored his first NHL goal on his first NHL shot in a 5–3 victory. The Leafs failed to qualify for the playoffs, and he was sent down to the Marlies.

He was recalled to the Leafs on February 23, 2007, and played against the Montreal Canadiens. During this game, Mats Sundin shot the puck at Montreal goaltender David Aebischer and the rebound came straight to Williams, who scored his second NHL goal in a 5–4 loss. Williams was called up on February 27, 2008, and scored that night against the Florida Panthers.

In the following 2008–09 season, on December 8, 2008, Williams scored on a pass from Jason Blake and also recorded his first NHL assist in his career against the New York Islanders in a 4 - 2 win on his first game of the season with the Toronto Maple Leafs. In all 4 of his seasons with the Toronto Maple Leafs in which he had been recalled from the minors, he has scored in his first NHL game of the season. On February 9, 2009, he was placed on waivers and was sent back to the Toronto Marlies of the AHL after clearing waivers.

On July 7, 2009, as an unrestricted free agent, Williams signed a one-year, two-way deal with the Detroit Red Wings along with Toronto Marlies teammate Kris Newbury. On July 12, 2010, Williams again being an unrestricted free agent, signed with the New York Rangers.

With his NHL career at an impasse, on June 15, 2011, Williams signed a one-year contract with European team, EC Red Bull Salzburg of the Austrian Hockey League.

On April 16, 2013, Williams signed a one-year contract with Swedish team, VIK Västerås HK. He was the leading goal scorer of the Swedish second-division HockeyAllsvenskan during the 2013–14 season. After three years in Sweden, he moved on to Germany, signing with Deutsche Eishockey Liga (DEL) side Straubing Tigers on June 29, 2016.

== Personal life ==
On August 6, 2011, Jeremy Williams married longtime girlfriend, actress Ashley Leggat, who is best known for portraying Casey McDonald in the television series Life with Derek. The couple have three daughters.

== Career statistics ==
			Regular season					Playoffs
Season	Team	League	GP	G	A	Pts	PIM	GP	G	A	Pts	PIM
2000–01	Swift Current Broncos	WHL	2	0	0	0	2	—	—	—	—	—
2001–02	Swift Current Legionnaires AAA	SMHL	24	18	23	41	64	—	—	—	—	—
2001–02	Swift Current Broncos	WHL	32	6	7	13	30	12	1	0	1	4
2002–03	Swift Current Broncos	WHL	72	41	52	93	117	4	1	0	1	6
2003–04	Swift Current Broncos	WHL	68	52	49	101	82	5	2	1	3	12
2003–04	St. John's Maple Leafs	AHL	4	0	2	2	0	—	—	—	—	—
2004–05	St. John's Maple Leafs	AHL	75	16	20	36	24	5	0	0	0	0
2005–06	Toronto Marlies	AHL	55	23	33	56	77	5	1	0	1	6
2005–06	Toronto Maple Leafs	NHL	1	1	0	1	0	—	—	—	—	—
2006–07	Toronto Marlies	AHL	23	6	9	15	27	—	—	—	—	—
2006–07	Toronto Maple Leafs	NHL	1	1	0	1	0	—	—	—	—	—
2007–08	Toronto Marlies	AHL	49	18	15	33	36	—	—	—	—	—
2007–08	Toronto Maple Leafs	NHL	18	2	0	2	4	—	—	—	—	—
2008–09	Toronto Marlies	AHL	46	27	13	40	29	6	0	1	1	6
2008–09	Toronto Maple Leafs	NHL	11	5	2	7	2	—	—	—	—	—
2009–10	Grand Rapids Griffins	AHL	77	32	31	63	55	—	—	—	—	—
2010–11	Hartford Wolf Pack/CT Whale	AHL	75	32	23	55	68	6	1	2	3	4
2010–11	New York Rangers	NHL	1	0	0	0	0	—	—	—	—	—
2011–12	EC Red Bull Salzburg	AUT	35	9	8	17	46	—	—	—	—	—
2012–13	HC Sierre	SUI.2	28	6	9	15	44	—	—	—	—	—
2012–13	Eispiraten Crimmitschau	GER.2	24	17	13	30	71	—	—	—	—	—
2013–14	VIK Västerås HK	Allsv	47	26	20	46	40	9	1	1	2	4
2014–15	VIK Västerås HK	Allsv	37	17	11	28	30	3	1	0	1	4
2015–16	VIK Västerås HK	Allsv	49	19	24	43	63	—	—	—	—	—
2016–17	Straubing Tigers	DEL	43	19	17	36	24	—	—	—	—	—
2017–18	Straubing Tigers	DEL	49	21	19	40	30	—	—	—	—	—
2017–18	Örebro HK	SHL	8	1	3	4	0	—	—	—	—	—
2018–19	Straubing Tigers	DEL	52	30	27	57	22	2	0	0	0	4
2019–20	Straubing Tigers	DEL	51	20	17	37	32	—	—	—	—	—
2020–21	Straubing Tigers	DEL	31	10	8	18	18	3	1	0	1	6
2021–22	Heilbronner Falken	DEL2	46	26	36	62	34	13	5	5	10	6
2022–23	Heilbronner Falken	DEL2	34	27	20	47	16	3	1	0	1	6
AHL totals			404	154	146	300	301	22	2	3	5	16
NHL totals			32	9	2	11	6	—	—	—	—	—
DEL totals			226	100	88	188	126	5	1	0	1	10

== Awards and honours ==
Awards	Year
WHL
East First All-Star Team	2004
