= 2005–06 Carolina Hurricanes season =

National Hockey League team season

2005–06 Carolina Hurricanes
- Stanley Cup champions
- Eastern Conference champions
- Southeast Division champions
- Division: 1st Southeast
- Conference: 2nd Eastern
- 2005–06 record: 52–22–8
- Home record: 31–8–2
- Road record: 21–14–6
- Goals for: 294
- Goals against: 260

Team information
- General manager: Jim Rutherford
- Coach: Peter Laviolette
- Captain: Rod Brind'Amour
- Alternate captains: Kevyn Adams; Cory Stillman; Glen Wesley
- Arena: RBC Center
- Average attendance: 15,596
- Minor league affiliates: Lowell Lock Monsters; Florida Everblades

Team leaders
- Goals: Eric Staal (45)
- Assists: Eric Staal, Cory Stillman (55)
- Points: Eric Staal (100)
- Penalty minutes: Mike Commodore (138)
- Plus/minus: Erik Cole (+19)
- Wins: Martin Gerber (38)
- Goals against average: Martin Gerber (2.78)

The 2005–06 Carolina Hurricanes season was the franchise's 34th season, 27th season in the National Hockey League and eighth as the Hurricanes. The Hurricanes won the Stanley Cup to win the second championship in franchise history. Their first was in 1973, when the team was known as the New England Whalers and played in the World Hockey Association; the Whalers were the inaugural champions of that league. This would also be Carolina's last Cup until the 2026 Stanley Cup Final.

== Offseason ==
Key dates prior to the start of the season:

- The 2005 NHL entry draft took place in Ottawa, Ontario, Canada on July 30, 2005.
- The free agency period began on August 1.

=== Free agency ===
- During the free agent signing period following the end of the 2004–05 NHL lockout, Cory Stillman agreed to a three-year contract with the Carolina Hurricanes on August 2, 2005.
- On August 6, 2005, Ray Whitney signed a two-year contract with the Carolina Hurricanes of the NHL's Eastern Conference, paying him $1.5 million per year.

== Roster ==
2005–06 Carolina Hurricanes
Roster
No.	Nat	Player	Pos	S/G	Age	Acquired	Birthplace
27	(Brunei)	Craig Adams	RW	R	28	2005	Seria, Brunei
14	(United States)	Kevyn Adams (AC)	C	R	31	2002	Washington, D.C.
37	(United States)	Keith Aucoin	C	R	27	2005	Waltham, Massachusetts
48	(Ukraine)	Anton Babchuk	D	R	21	2006	Kyiv, Ukrainian SSR, USSR
36	(United States)	Jesse Boulerice	RW	R	27	2002	Rouses Point, New York
17	(Canada)	Rod Brind'Amour (C)	C	L	35	2000	Ottawa, Ontario
26	(United States)	Erik Cole	RW	L	27	1998	Oswego, New York
22	(Canada)	Mike Commodore	D	R	26	2005	Fort Saskatchewan, Alberta
8	(United States)	Matt Cullen	C	L	29	2004	Virginia, Minnesota
29	(Switzerland)						
34	(United States)						
6	(United States)						
24	(United States)						
5	(Czech Republic)	František Kaberle					
16	(Canada)						
59	(United States)						
44	(Sweden)						
18	(Canada)						
51	(United States)						
12	(Canada)	Eric Staal					
61	(Canada)	Cory Stillman (AC)					
70	(Ukraine)						
63	(Czech Republic)						
19	(Czech Republic)						
7	(Sweden)						
4	(Canada)						
30	(Canada)						
39	(United States)						
2	(Canada)	Glen Wesley (AC)					
13	(Canada)						
11	(Canada)						
18	(Canada)	Michael Zigomanis					
Head coach
Peter Laviolette
Assistant Coach
Jeff Daniels; Kevin McCarthy

== Regular season ==
On Friday, April 7, 2006, the Hurricanes scored three short-handed goals in a 4–3 win over the Washington Capitals.

=== Final standings ===
Southeast Division
No.	CR		GP	W	L	OTL	GF	GA	Pts
1	2	**Carolina Hurricanes**	82	52	22	8	294	260	112
2	8	**Tampa Bay Lightning**	82	43	33	6	252	260	92
3	10	Atlanta Thrashers	82	41	33	8	281	275	90
4	11	Florida Panthers	82	37	34	11	240	257	85
5	14	Washington Capitals	82	29	41	12	237	306	70

Note: CR = Conference rank; GP = Games played; W = Wins; L = Losses; T = Ties; OTL = Overtime loss; GF = Goals for; GA = Goals against; Pts = Points
Bolded teams qualified for the playoffs.

Eastern Conference
R		Div	GP	W	L	OTL	GF	GA	Pts
**1**	**Z-** Ottawa Senators	**NE**	**82**	**52**	**21**	**9**	**314**	**211**	113
**2**	**Y-** Carolina Hurricanes	**SE**	**82**	**52**	**22**	**8**	**294**	**260**	112
**3**	**Y-** New Jersey Devils	**AT**	**82**	**46**	**27**	**9**	**242**	**229**	101
**4**	**X-** Buffalo Sabres	**NE**	**82**	**52**	**24**	**6**	**242**	**239**	110
**5**	**X-** Philadelphia Flyers	**AT**	**82**	**45**	**26**	**11**	**267**	**259**	101
**6**	**X-** New York Rangers	**AT**	**82**	**44**	**26**	**12**	**257**	**215**	100
**7**	**X-** Montreal Canadiens	**NE**	**82**	**42**	**31**	**9**	**243**	**247**	93
**8**	**X-** Tampa Bay Lightning	**SE**	**82**	**43**	**33**	**6**	**252**	**260**	92
8.5
9	Toronto Maple Leafs	NE	82	41	33	8	257	270	90
10	Atlanta Thrashers	SE	82	41	33	8	281	275	90
11	Florida Panthers	SE	82	37	34	11	240	257	85
12	New York Islanders	AT	82	36	40	6	230	278	78
13	Boston Bruins	NE	82	29	37	16	230	266	74
14	Washington Capitals	SE	82	29	41	12	237	306	70
15	Pittsburgh Penguins	AT	82	22	46	14	244	316	58

Divisions: AT – Atlantic, NE – Northeast, SE – Southeast

Z – Clinched conference; Y – Clinched division; X – Clinched playoff spot

=== Record vs. opponents ===
==== Vs. Eastern Conference ====
Vs. Atlantic Division

2005–06 NHL records
Team	NJD	NYI	NYR	PHI	PIT	Total
Atlanta	2–0–2	1–3–0	2–2–0	0–3–1	3–1–0	**8–9–3**
Carolina	2–1–1	3–1–0	3–1–0	2–0–2	3–1–0	**13–4–3**
Florida	1–3–0	2–1–1	1–2–1	0–2–2	3–1–0	**7–9–4**
Tampa Bay	2–2–0	4–0–0	2–2–0	4–0–0	4–0–0	**16–4–0**
Washington	2–2–0	4–0–0	2–2–0	4–0–0	1–3–0	**13–7–0**

Vs. Northeast Division

2005–06 NHL records
Team	BOS	BUF	MTL	OTT	TOR	Total
Atlanta	2–2–0	2–2–0	1–2–1	2–2–0	0–4–0	**7–12–1**
Carolina	3–1–0	3–1–0	4–0–0	2–2–0	2–1–1	**14–5–1**
Florida	2–2–0	3–1–0	1–1–2	2–2–0	0–3–1	**8–9–3**
Tampa Bay	1–3–0	0–3–1	1–3–0	0–4–0	2–2–0	**4–15–1**
Washington	1–2–1	1–3–0	2–2–0	1–3–0	3–1–0	**8–11–1**

Vs. Southeast Division

2005–06 NHL records
Team	ATL	CAR	FLA	TBL	WSH	Total
Atlanta	—	4–4–0	3–4–1	4–3–1	5–1–2	**16–12–4**
Carolina	4–4–0	—	6–1–1	3–3–2	5–3–0	**18–11–3**
Florida	4–3–1	1–6–1	—	6–2–0	7–0–1	**18–11–3**
Tampa Bay	3–4–1	3–3–2	2–6–0	—	4–2–2	**12–15–5**
Washington	1–5–2	3–5–0	1–7–0	2–4–2	—	**7–21–4**

==== Vs. Western Conference ====
Vs. Central Division

2005–06 NHL records
Team	CHI	CBJ	DET	NSH	STL	Total
Atlanta	0–0–1	1–0–0	1–0–0	0–0–1	1–0–0	**3–0–2**
Carolina	1–0–0	1–0–0	1–0–0	1–0–0	1–0–0	**5–0–0**
Florida	1–0–0	0–1–0	1–0–0	1–0–0	1–0–0	**4–1–0**
Tampa Bay	1–0–0	1–0–0	0–1–0	1–0–0	1–0–0	**4–1–0**
Washington	0–0–1	1–0–0	0–1–0	0–1–0	1–0–0	**2–3–0**

Vs. Northwest Division

2005–06 NHL records
Team	CGY	COL	EDM	MIN	VAN	Total
Atlanta	0–0–0	0–0–0	0–0–0	0–0–0	0–0–0	**0–0–0**
Carolina	0–0–0	0–0–0	0–0–0	0–0–0	0–0–0	**0–0–0**
Florida	0–0–0	0–0–0	0–0–0	0–0–0	0–0–0	**0–0–0**
Tampa Bay	0–0–0	0–0–0	0–0–0	0–0–0	0–0–0	**0–0–0**
Washington	0–0–0	0–0–0	0–0–0	0–0–0	0–0–0	**0–0–0**

Vs. Pacific Division

2005–06 NHL records
Team	MDA	DAL	LAK	PHX	SJS	Total
Atlanta	0–1–0	0–1–0	0–1–0	0–1–0	0–1–0	**0–5–0**
Carolina	1–0–0	1–0–0	1–0–0	0–1–0	0–1–0	**3–2–0**
Florida	0–1–0	0–1–0	0–1–0	0–1–0	0–1–0	**0–5–0**
Tampa Bay	0–1–0	1–0–0	1–0–0	1–0–0	0–1–0	**3–2–0**
Washington	1–0–0	0–1–0	1–0–0	1–0–0	0–1–0	**3–2–0**

== Playoffs ==
The Carolina Hurricanes ended the 2005–06 regular season as the winners of the Southeast Division, with 112 points. The Hurricanes received the second seed in the Eastern Conference, just one point behind the Ottawa Senators.

The Hurricanes defeated the Montreal Canadiens in the first round, four games to two. In the second round, the Hurricanes defeated the New Jersey Devils, four games to one. In the Conference Final, the Hurricanes defeated the Buffalo Sabres in a game seven to advance to the Stanley Cup Finals for the second time in franchise history. In the Final, the Hurricanes defeated the Edmonton Oilers in another game seven to claim the franchise's first Stanley Cup championship.

== Schedule and results ==
=== Regular season ===
2005–06 regular season
October: 8–2–1 (home: 5–0–0; road: 3–2–1)

Game	Date	Opponent	Score	OT	Decision	Location	Attendance	Record	Points	Recap
1	October 5	@ Tampa Bay	2–5			St. Pete Times Forum		0–1–0	0	L
2	October 7	Pittsburgh	3–2	SO		RBC Center		1–1–0	2	W
3	October 8	@ N.Y. Islanders	2–3			Nassau Veterans Memorial Coliseum		1–2–0	2	L
4	October 12	Washington	7–2			RBC Center		2–2–0	4	W
5	October 15	@ New Jersey	6–1		C. Ward	Continental Airlines Arena	14,723	3–2–0	6	
6	October 20	@ Toronto	4–5	OT		Air Canada Centre		3–2–1	7	OTL
7	October 22	@ Washington	4–0			MCI Center		4–2–1	9	W
8	October 24	Ottawa	3–2		Gerber	RBC Center		5–2–1	11	
9	October 26	Boston	4–3	OT		RBC Center		6–2–1	13	W
10	October 28	Philadelphia	8–6			RBC Center		7–2–1	15	W
11	October 29	@ Pittsburgh	5–3			Mellon Arena		8–2–1	17	W

November: 8–5–0 (home: 4–4–0; road: 4–1–0)

Game	Date	Opponent	Score	OT	Decision	Location	Attendance	Record	Points	Recap
12	November 3	Toronto	4–3			RBC Center		9–2–1	19	W
13	November 5	Florida	2–0			RBC Center		10–2–1	21	W
14	November 9	@ Buffalo	5–3		Gerber	HSBC Arena	13,106	11–2–1	23	
15	November 11	@ Florida	1–0			Bank Atlantic Center		12–2–1	25	W
16	November 12	Atlanta	0–9			RBC Center		12–3–1	25	L
17	November 15	@ Ottawa	2–1		Gerber	Scotiabank Place	19,115	13–3–1	27	
18	November 17	N.Y. Rangers	5–1			RBC Center		14–3–1	29	W
19	November 19	@ N.Y. Rangers	3–4			Madison Square Garden		14–4–1	29	L
20	November 20	Tampa Bay	2–5			RBC Center		14–5–1	29	L
21	November 22	Ottawa	3–5		Gerber	RBC Center	13,427	14–6–1	29	
22	November 25	Toronto	4–3	SO		RBC Center		15–6–1	31	W
23	November 27	Atlanta	2–5			RBC Center		15–7–1	31	L
24	November 29	@ Atlanta	4–3	OT		Philips Arena		16–7–1	33	W

December: 8–3–3 (home: 6–0–1; road: 2–3–2)

Game	Date	Opponent	Score	OT	Decision	Location	Attendance	Record	Points	Recap
25	December 2	@ Dallas	4–5	SO		American Airlines Center		16–7–2	34	OTL
26	December 3	@ Phoenix	4–8			America West Arena		16–8–2	34	L
27	December 6	@ Anaheim	6–2		Gerber	Arrowhead Pond of Anaheim	13,045	17–8–2	36	
28	December 8	@ Los Angeles	3–2			Staples Center		18–8–2	38	W
29	December 10	@ San Jose	3–4		Gerber	HP Pavilion	17,241	18–9–2	38	
30	December 13	Chicago	5–3			RBC Center		19–9–2	40	W
31	December 15	Columbus	2–1			RBC Center		20–9–2	42	W
32	December 17	New Jersey	4–1		Gerber	RBC Center	16,206	21–9–2	44	
33	December 20	Tampa Bay	6–4			RBC Center		22–9–2	46	W
34	December 23	Florida	4–3			RBC Center		23–9–2	48	W
35	December 26	@ Tampa Bay	4–5	OT		St. Pete Times Forum		23–9–3	49	OTL
36	December 28	@ Ottawa	2–6		Gerber	Scotiabank Place	20,050	23–10–3	49	
37	December 29	Philadelphia	3–4	OT		RBC Center		23–10–4	50	OTL
38	December 31	Montreal	5–3			RBC Center		24–10–4	52	W

January: 13–1–0 (home: 8–0–0; road: 5–1–0)

Game	Date	Opponent	Score	OT	Decision	Location	Attendance	Record	Points	Recap
39	January 4	Atlanta	4–3			RBC Center		25–10–4	54	W
40	January 6	N.Y. Islanders	4–1			RBC Center		26–10–4	56	W
41	January 7	@ N.Y. Islanders	3–0			Nassau Veterans Memorial Coliseum		27–10–4	58	W
42	January 10	Detroit	3–2			RBC Center		28–10–4	60	W
43	January 13	Nashville	5–4	OT		RBC Center		29–10–4	62	W
44	January 15	St. Louis	4–2			RBC Center		30–10–4	64	W
45	January 17	@ Philadelphia	4–3	SO		Wachovia Center		31–10–4	66	W
46	January 19	N.Y. Islanders	4–3			RBC Center		32–10–4	68	W
47	January 21	@ Washington	2–5			MCI Center		32–11–4	68	L
48	January 23	Montreal	7–3			RBC Center		33–11–4	70	W
49	January 25	@ Florida	4–3	SO		Bank Atlantic Center		34–11–4	72	W
50	January 26	@ Atlanta	5–1			Philips Arena		35–11–4	74	W
51	January 28	Atlanta	4–1			RBC Center		36–11–4	76	W
52	January 31	@ Montreal	8–2			Bell Centre		37–11–4	78	W

February: 2–3–0 (home: 1–1–0; road: 1–2–0)

Game	Date	Opponent	Score	OT	Decision	Location	Attendance	Record	Points	Recap
53	February 3	@ New Jersey	0–3		C. Ward	Continental Airlines Arena	19,040	37–12–4	78	
54	February 5	@ Boston	4–3	SO		TD Banknorth Garden		38–12–4	80	W
55	February 9	@ Tampa Bay	3–5			St. Pete Times Forum		38–13–4	80	L
56	February 10	Pittsburgh	3–4			RBC Center		38–14–4	80	L
57	February 12	Buffalo	4–3	SO	Gerber	RBC Center	18,730	39–14–4	82	

March: 9–5–2 (home: 5–2–0; road: 4–3–2)

Game	Date	Opponent	Score	OT	Decision	Location	Attendance	Record	Points	Recap
58	March 1	Boston	4–3			RBC Center		40–14–4	84	W
59	March 3	Florida	5–2			RBC Center		41–14–4	86	W
60	March 4	@ Pittsburgh	7–5			Mellon Arena		42–14–4	88	W
61	March 6	@ N.Y. Rangers	2–1			Madison Square Garden		43–14–4	90	W
62	March 8	@ Philadelphia	2–3	SO		Wachovia Center		43–14–5	91	OTL
63	March 10	@ Florida	3–5			Bank Atlantic Center		43–15–5	91	L
64	March 11	@ Florida	3–4	OT		Bank Atlantic Center		43–15–6	92	OTL
65	March 14	N.Y. Rangers	5–3			RBC Center		44–15–6	94	W
66	March 16	@ Montreal	5–1			Bell Centre		45–15–6	96	W
67	March 18	@ Boston	2–4			TD Banknorth Garden		45–16–6	96	L
68	March 21	@ Toronto	2–3			Air Canada Centre		45–17–6	96	L
69	March 22	@ Buffalo	4–3		Gerber	HSBC Arena	18,690	46–17–6	98	W
70	March 25	Washington	1–3			RBC Center		46–18–6	98	L
71	March 27	Tampa Bay	2–1			RBC Center		47–18–6	100	W
72	March 29	Washington	1–5			RBC Center		47–19–6	100	L
73	March 31	Florida	3–2			RBC Center		48–19–6	102	W

April: 4–3–2 (home: 2–1–1; road: 2–2–1)

Game	Date	Opponent	Score	OT	Decision	Location	Attendance	Record	Points	Recap
74	April 1	@ Atlanta	2–5			Philips Arena		48–20–6	102	L
75	April 3	Washington	6–5	OT		RBC Center		49–20–6	104	W
76	April 5	@ Washington	4–3	SO		Verizon Center		50–20–6	106	W
77	April 7	@ Washington	4–3			Verizon Center		51–20–6	108	W
78	April 8	@ Atlanta	2–5			Philips Arena		51–21–6	108	L
79	April 11	New Jersey	3–4	OT	Gerber	RBC Center	14,232	51–21–7	109	
80	April 14	Tampa Bay	5–4	SO		RBC Center		52–21–7	111	W
81	April 15	@ Tampa Bay	2–3	OT		St. Pete Times Forum		52–21–8	112	OTL
82	April 18	Buffalo	0–4		Gerber	RBC Center	18,730	52–22–8	112	L

Legend: Win (2 points) Loss (0 points) Overtime/shootout loss (1 point)

=== Playoffs ===
2006 Stanley Cup playoffs
Eastern Conference Quarterfinals vs. (7) Montreal Canadiens: Carolina won 4–2

Game	Date	Opponent	Score	OT	Decision	Location	Attendance	Series	Recap
1	April 22	Montreal	1–6			RBC Center		0–1	L
2	April 24	Montreal	5–6	2OT		RBC Center		0–2	L
3	April 26	@ Montreal	2–1	OT		Bell Centre		1–2	W
4	April 28	@ Montreal	3–2			Bell Centre		2–2	W
5	April 30	Montreal	2–1			RBC Center		3–2	W
6	May 2	@ Montreal	2–1	OT		Bell Centre		4–2	W

Eastern Conference Semifinals vs. (3) New Jersey Devils: Carolina won 4–1

Game	Date	Opponent	Score	OT	Decision	Location	Attendance	Series	Recap
1	May 6	New Jersey	6–0		C. Ward	RBC Center	18,730	1–0	
2	May 8	New Jersey	3–2	OT	C. Ward	RBC Center	18,730	2–0	
3	May 10	@ New Jersey	3–2		C. Ward	Continental Airlines Arena	16,862	3–0	
4	May 13	@ New Jersey	1–5		C. Ward	Continental Airlines Arena	17,585	3–1	
5	May 14	New Jersey	4–1		C. Ward	RBC Center	18,730	4–1	

Eastern Conference Finals vs. (4) Buffalo Sabres: Carolina won 4–3

Game	Date	Opponent	Score	OT	Decision	Location	Attendance	Series	Recap
1	May 20	Buffalo	2–3		C. Ward	RBC Center	18,730	0–1	
2	May 22	Buffalo	4–3		C. Ward	RBC Center	18,730	1–1	
3	May 24	@ Buffalo	3–4		C. Ward	HSBC Arena	18,690	1–2	
4	May 26	@ Buffalo	4–0		Gerber	HSBC Arena	18,690	2–2	
5	May 28	Buffalo	4–3	OT	C. Ward	RBC Center	18,730	3–2	
6	May 30	@ Buffalo	1–2	OT	C. Ward	HSBC Arena	18,690	3–3	
7	June 1	Buffalo	4–2		C. Ward	RBC Center	18,730	4–3	

Stanley Cup Final vs. (W8) Edmonton Oilers: Carolina won 4–3

Game	Date	Opponent	Score	OT	Decision	Location	Attendance	Series	Recap
1	June 5	Edmonton	5–4		C. Ward	RBC Center	18,797	1–0	
2	June 7	Edmonton	5–0		C. Ward	RBC Center	18,929	2–0	
3	June 10	@ Edmonton	1–2		C. Ward	Rexall Place	16,839	2–1	
4	June 12	@ Edmonton	2–1		C. Ward	Rexall Place	16,839	3–1	
5	June 14	Edmonton	3–4	OT	C. Ward	RBC Center	18,974	3–2	
6	June 17	@ Edmonton	0–4		C. Ward	Rexall Place	16,839	3–3	
7	June 19	Edmonton	3–1		C. Ward	RBC Center	18,978	4–3	

Legend: Win Loss

== Starting Lineups ==
=== Regular Season ===
2005–06 Regular Season Starting Lineup game log
October

#	Date	Opponent	LW	C	RW	D	D	G
5	October 15	@ NJD						#30; C. Ward
8	October 24	OTT						#29; Gerber

November

#	Date	Opponent	LW	C	RW	D	D	G
14	November 9	@ BUF						#29; Gerber
17	November 15	@ OTT						#29; Gerber
21	November 22	OTT						#29; Gerber

December

#	Date	Opponent	LW	C	RW	D	D	G
27	December 6	@ MDA						#29; Gerber
29	December 10	@ SJS						#29; Gerber
32	December 17	NJD						#29; Gerber
36	December 28	@ OTT						#29; Gerber

January

#	Date	Opponent	LW	C	RW	D	D	G

February

#	Date	Opponent	LW	C	RW	D	D	G
53	February 3	@ NJD						#30; C. Ward
57	February 12	BUF						#29; Gerber

March

#	Date	Opponent	LW	C	RW	D	D	G
69	March 22	@ BUF						#29; Gerber

April

#	Date	Opponent	LW	C	RW	D	D	G
79	April 11	NJD						#29; Gerber
82	April 18	BUF						#29; Gerber

=== Stanley Cup Playoffs ===
2005–06 Stanley Cup Playoffs Starting Lineup game log
Eastern Conference Quarterfinals: vs. (7) Montreal Canadiens

#	Date	Opponent	LW	C	RW	D	D	G

Eastern Conference Semifinals: vs. (3) New Jersey Devils

#	Date	Opponent	LW	C	RW	D	D	G
1	May 6	NJD						#30; C. Ward
2	May 8	NJD						#30; C. Ward
3	May 10	@ NJD						#30; C. Ward
4	May 13	@ NJD						#30; C. Ward
5	May 14	NJD						#30; C. Ward

Eastern Conference Finals: vs. (4) Buffalo Sabres

#	Date	Opponent	LW	C	RW	D	D	G
1	May 20	BUF						#30; C. Ward
2	May 22	BUF						#30; C. Ward
3	May 24	@ BUF						#30; C. Ward
4	May 26	@ BUF						#30; C. Ward
5	May 28	BUF						#30; C. Ward
6	May 30	@ BUF						#30; C. Ward
7	June 1	BUF						#30; C. Ward

Stanley Cup Final: vs. (W8) Edmonton Oilers

#	Date	Opponent	LW	C	RW	D	D	G
1	June 5	EDM						#30; C. Ward
2	June 7	EDM						#30; C. Ward
3	June 10	@ EDM						#30; C. Ward
4	June 12	@ EDM						#30; C. Ward
5	June 14	EDM						#30; C. Ward
6	June 17	@ EDM						#30; C. Ward
7	June 19	EDM						#30; C. Ward

== Game Officials ==
=== Regular Season ===
2005–06 Regular Season Officials game log
October

#	Date	Opponent	Referees	Linesmen
5	October 15	@ NJD	Kerry Fraser; Eric Furlatt	Steve Miller; Derek Nansen
8	October 24	OTT	Greg Kimmerly; Dan Marouelli	Steve Barton; Jean Morin

November

#	Date	Opponent	Referees	Linesmen
14	November 9	@ BUF	Dan Marouelli; Tim Peel	Steve Miller; Mark Shewchyk
17	November 15	@ OTT	Eric Furlatt; Tim Peel	Steve Miller; Derek Nansen
21	November 22	OTT	Greg Kimmerly; Dan Marouelli	Andy McElman; Tim Nowak

December

#	Date	Opponent	Referees	Linesmen
27	December 6	@ MDA	Blaine Angus; Dan Marouelli	Brad Lazarowich; Thor Nelson
29	December 10	@ SJS	Mike Leggo; Rob Shick	Don Henderson; Jay Sharrers
32	December 17	NJD	Dave Jackson; Dan O'Rourke	Tim Nowak; Mark Paré
36	December 28	@ OTT	Dave Jackson; Chris Lee	Pierre Champoux; Derek Nansen

January

#	Date	Opponent	Referees	Linesmen

February

#	Date	Opponent	Referees	Linesmen
53	February 3	@ NJD	Don Koharski; Dan O'Halloran	Angelo D'Amico; Steve Miller
57	February 12	BUF	Kerry Fraser; Tom Kowal	Jonny Murray; Jay Sharrers

March

#	Date	Opponent	Referees	Linesmen
69	March 22	@ BUF	Dan Marouelli; Brad Meier	David Brisebois; Scott Driscoll

April

#	Date	Opponent	Referees	Linesmen
79	April 11	NJD	Dave Jackson; Marc Joannette	Tim Nowak; Pierre Racicot
82	April 18	BUF	Mike Leggo; Dan O'Halloran	Derek Nansen; Mark Shewchyk

=== Stanley Cup Playoffs ===
2005–06 Stanley Cup Playoffs Officials game log
Eastern Conference Quarterfinals: vs. (7) Montreal Canadiens

#	Date	Opponent	Referees	Linesmen

Eastern Conference Semifinals: vs. (3) New Jersey Devils

#	Date	Opponent	Referees	Linesmen
1	May 6	NJD	Don Koharski; Dan O'Halloran	Greg Devorski; Pierre Racicot
2	May 8	NJD	Kevin Pollock; Rob Shick	Brian Murphy; Tim Nowak
3	May 10	@ NJD	Paul Devorski; Don Van Massenhoven	Brian Murphy; Tim Nowak
4	May 13	@ NJD	Dave Jackson; Brad Watson	Scott Driscoll; Jean Morin
5	May 14	NJD	Mike Leggo; Mick McGeough	Scott Driscoll; Jean Morin

Eastern Conference Finals: vs. (4) Buffalo Sabres

#	Date	Opponent	Referees	Linesmen
1	May 20	BUF	Eric Furlatt; Mick McGeough	Brian Murphy; Tim Nowak
2	May 22	BUF	Dan O'Halloran; Don Van Massenhoven	Brian Murphy; Tim Nowak
3	May 24	@ BUF	Marc Joannette; Rob Shick	Derek Amell; Greg Devorski
4	May 26	@ BUF	Mick McGeough; Brad Watson	Derek Amell; Greg Devorski
5	May 28	BUF	Paul Devorski; Don Van Massenhoven	Jean Morin; Pierre Racicot
6	May 30	@ BUF	Bill McCreary; Dan O'Halloran	Scott Driscoll; Jay Sharrers
7	June 1	BUF	Paul Devorski; Brad Watson	Greg Devorski; Jay Sharrers

Stanley Cup Final: vs. (W8) Edmonton Oilers

#	Date	Opponent	Referees	Linesmen
1	June 5	EDM	Paul Devorski; Mick McGeough	Jean Morin; Pierre Racicot
2	June 7	EDM	Bill McCreary; Brad Watson	Greg Devorski; Jay Sharrers
3	June 10	@ EDM	Paul Devorski; Mick McGeough	Jean Morin; Pierre Racicot
4	June 12	@ EDM	Bill McCreary; Brad Watson	Greg Devorski; Jay Sharrers
5	June 14	EDM	Paul Devorski; Mick McGeough	Jean Morin; Pierre Racicot
6	June 17	@ EDM	Bill McCreary; Brad Watson	Greg Devorski; Jay Sharrers
7	June 19	EDM	Bill McCreary; Brad Watson	Greg Devorski; Jay Sharrers

== Player statistics ==
=== Scoring ===
- Position abbreviations: C = Center; D = Defense; G = Goaltender; LW = Left wing; RW = Right wing
- † = Joined team via a transaction (e.g., trade, waivers, signing) during the season. Stats reflect time with the Hurricanes only.
- ‡ = Left team via a transaction (e.g., trade, waivers, release) during the season. Stats reflect time with the Hurricanes only.

No.	Player	Pos	Regular season						Playoffs					
No.	Player	Pos	GP	G	A	Pts	+/-	PIM	GP	G	A	Pts	+/-	PIM
12	Eric Staal	C	82	45	55	100	−8	81	25	9	19	28	0	8
11	Justin Williams	RW	82	31	45	76	1	60	25	7	11	18	12	34
61	Cory Stillman	LW	72	21	55	76	−9	32	25	9	17	26	12	14
17	Rod Brind'Amour	C	78	31	39	70	8	68	25	12	6	18	9	16
26	Erik Cole	RW	60	30	29	59	19	54	2	0	0	0	−1	0
13	Ray Whitney	RW	63	17	38	55	0	42	24	9	6	15	−1	14
8	Matt Cullen	C	78	25	24	49	4	40	25	4	14	18	2	12
5	Frantisek Kaberle	D	77	6	38	44	8	46	25	4	9	13	−7	8
6	Bret Hedican	D	74	5	22	27	11	58	25	2	9	11	6	42
4	Aaron Ward	D	71	6	19	25	2	62	25	2	3	5	0	18
14	Kevyn Adams	C	82	15	8	23	0	36	25	0	0	0	−4	14
70	Oleg Tverdovsky	D	72	3	20	23	−1	37	5	0	0	0	−1	0
27	Craig Adams	RW	67	10	11	21	1	51	25	0	0	0	−4	10
39	Doug Weight†	C	23	4	9	13	−6	25	23	3	13	16	−3	20
22	Mike Commodore	D	72	3	10	13	12	138	25	2	2	4	1	33
59	Chad LaRose	RW	49	1	12	13	7	35	21	0	1	1	−2	10
16	Andrew Ladd	LW	29	6	5	11	0	4	17	2	3	5	0	4
24	Andrew Hutchinson	D	36	3	8	11	−2	18	—	—	—	—	—	—
2	Glen Wesley	D	64	2	8	10	10	46	25	0	2	2	1	16
63	Josef Vasicek	C	23	4	5	9	3	8	8	0	0	0	−2	2
7	Niclas Wallin	D	50	4	4	8	2	42	25	1	4	5	3	14
18	Mark Recchi†	RW	20	4	3	7	−8	12	25	7	9	16	−5	18
44	Niklas Nordgren‡	LW	43	4	2	6	−4	40	—	—	—	—	—	—
48	Anton Babchuk†	D	22	3	2	5	−2	6	—	—	—	—	—	—
19	Radim Vrbata‡	RW	16	2	3	5	0	6	—	—	—	—	—	—
30	Cam Ward	G	28	0	2	2		0	23	0	1	1		0
29	Martin Gerber	G	60	0	2	2		4	6	0	0	0		4
18	Michael Zigomanis‡	C	21	1	0	1	1	4	—	—	—	—	—	—
34	David Gove	C	1	0	1	1	2	0	—	—	—	—	—	—
37	Keith Aucoin	C	7	0	1	1	−4	4	—	—	—	—	—	—
51	Danny Richmond‡	D	10	0	1	1	−3	7	—	—	—	—	—	—
36	Jesse Boulerice‡	RW	26	0	0	0	−3	51	—	—	—	—	—	—

=== Goaltending ===
No.	Player	Regular season										Playoffs								
No.	Player	GP	W	L	OT	SA	GA	GAA	SV%	SO	TOI	GP	W	L	SA	GA	GAA	SV%	SO	TOI
29	Martin Gerber	60	38	14	6	1719	162	2.78	.906	3	3493	6	1	1	90	13	3.52	.856	1	221
30	Cam Ward	28	14	8	2	773	91	3.68	.882	0	1484	23	15	8	584	47	2.14	.920	2	1320

== Awards and honors ==
=== Awards ===
Type	Award/honor	Recipient	Ref
League (annual)	Conn Smythe Trophy	Cam Ward	
League (annual)	Frank J. Selke Trophy	Rod Brind'Amour	
League (annual)	NHL Second All-Star Team	Eric Staal (Center)	
League (in-season)	NHL Offensive Player of the Month	Eric Staal (October)	
League (in-season)	NHL Offensive Player of the Week	Eric Staal (October 31)	
League (in-season)	NHL Offensive Player of the Week	Eric Staal (January 16)	
League (in-season)	NHL Offensive Player of the Week	Eric Staal (March 6)	
Team	Good Guy Award	Aaron Ward	
Team	Most Valuable Player	Eric Staal	
Team	Steve Chiasson Award	Rod Brind'Amour	

=== Milestones ===
Milestone	Player	Date	Ref
First game	Niklas Nordgren	October 5, 2005	
First game	Cam Ward	October 5, 2005	
First game	Danny Richmond	November 11, 2005	
First game	Andrew Ladd	November 20, 2005	
First game	Chad LaRose	December 6, 2005	
First game	Keith Aucoin	January 23, 2006	
First game	David Gove	January 31, 2006	

== Transactions ==
The Hurricanes were involved in the following transactions from February 17, 2005, the day after the 2004–05 NHL season was officially cancelled, through June 19, 2006, the day of the deciding game of the 2006 Stanley Cup Finals.

=== Trades ===
Date	Details		Ref
July 29, 2005	To Nashville Predators: Phoenix’s 3rd-round pick in 2005	To Carolina Hurricanes: Andrew Hutchinson	
July 29, 2005	To Calgary Flames: Atlanta’s 3rd-round pick in 2005	To Carolina Hurricanes: Mike Commodore	
July 30, 2005	To Toronto Maple Leafs: Jeff O'Neill	To Carolina Hurricanes: Conditional 4th-round pick in 2006	
July 30, 2005	To Columbus Blue Jackets: Toronto’s 4th-round pick in 2005	To Carolina Hurricanes: Rights to Derrick Walser; 4th-round pick in 2006	
October 3, 2005	To Anaheim Mighty Ducks: Bruno St. Jacques	To Carolina Hurricanes: Craig Adams	
December 28, 2005	To Washington Capitals: Colin Forbes	To Carolina Hurricanes: Stephen Peat	
December 28, 2005	To Phoenix Coyotes: Pavel Brendl	To Carolina Hurricanes: Krys Kolanos	
December 29, 2005	To Chicago Blackhawks: Radim Vrbata	To Carolina Hurricanes: Future considerations	
January 20, 2006	To Chicago Blackhawks: Danny Richmond; Columbus’ 4th-round pick in 2006	To Carolina Hurricanes: Anton Babchuk; 4th-round pick in 2007	
January 30, 2006	To St. Louis Blues: Jesse Boulerice; Michael Zigomanis; Rights to Magnus Kahnberg; 1st-round pick in 2006; Toronto’s 4th-round pick in 2006; Chicago’s 4th-round pick in 2007	To Carolina Hurricanes: Doug Weight; Rights to Erkki Rajamaki	
March 9, 2006	To Pittsburgh Penguins: Krys Kolanos; Niklas Nordgren; 2nd-round pick in 2007	To Carolina Hurricanes: Mark Recchi	

=== Players acquired ===
Date	Player	Former team	Term	Via	Ref
August 2, 2005	Cory Stillman	Tampa Bay Lightning	3-year	Free agency	
August 4, 2005	Keith Aucoin	Providence Bruins (AHL)	1-year	Free agency	
August 4, 2005	David Gove	Providence Bruins (AHL)	1-year	Free agency	
August 4, 2005	Oleg Tverdovsky	Avangard Omsk (RSL)	3-year	Free agency	
August 6, 2005	Ray Whitney	Detroit Red Wings	2-year	Free agency	
August 16, 2005	Chris Hajt	Portland Pirates (AHL)	1-year	Free agency	
September 15, 2005	Vince Bellissimo	San Antonio Rampage (AHL)	2-year	Free agency	

=== Players lost ===
Date	Player	New team	Via (Note: In parentheses is the player's free agency group on August 1 if applicable.)	Ref
August 10, 2005	Ed Hill	Phoenix Roadrunners (ECHL)	Free agency (UFA)	
August 12, 2005	Allan Rourke	New York Islanders	Free agency (VI)	
August 15, 2005	Brad Fast	Los Angeles Kings	Free agency (UFA)	
August 16, 2005	Marty Murray	Hannover Scorpions (DEL)	Free agency (UFA)	
August 30, 2005	Rob Zepp	SaiPa (Liiga)	Free agency (UFA)	
September 8, 2005	Jared Newman	Missouri River Otters (UHL)	Free agency (UFA)	
October 2005	Jim Henkel	Norfolk Admirals (AHL)	Free agency (UFA)	
October 13, 2005	Sean Curry	Providence Bruins (AHL)	Free agency (UFA)	
November 16, 2005	Ryan Bayda	Manitoba Moose (AHL)	Free agency (UFA)	
N/A	Daniel Boisclair	Trois-Rivieres Caron & Guay (LNAH)	Free agency (UFA)	

=== Signings ===
Date	Player	Term	Contract type	Ref
July 28, 2005	Kevin Nastiuk	multi-year	Entry-level	
August 8, 2005	Matt Cullen	1-year	Re-signing	
August 9, 2005	Kevyn Adams	2-year	Re-signing	
August 10, 2005	Radim Vrbata	1-year	Re-signing	
August 10, 2005	Justin Williams	1-year	Re-signing	
August 12, 2005	Jesse Boulerice	1-year	Re-signing	
August 12, 2005	Erik Cole	1-year	Re-signing	
August 12, 2005	Gordie Dwyer	1-year	Re-signing	
August 12, 2005	Colin Forbes	1-year	Re-signing	
August 12, 2005	Michael Zigomanis	1-year	Re-signing	
August 15, 2005	Pavel Brendl	1-year	Re-signing	
August 15, 2005	Bruno St. Jacques	1-year	Re-signing	
August 16, 2005	Glen Wesley	1-year	Re-signing	
August 18, 2005	Josef Vasicek	2-year	Re-signing	
August 24, 2005	Niklas Nordgren	1-year	Entry-level	
September 27, 2005	Andrew Ladd	3-year	Entry-level	
October 4, 2005	Kevin Estrada	2-year	Entry-level	
May 31, 2006	Brett Carson	3-year	Entry-level	
May 31, 2006	Daniel Manzato	2-year	Entry-level	
May 31, 2006	Justin Peters	3-year	Entry-level	

== Draft picks ==
Carolina's draft picks at the 2005 NHL entry draft held at the Westin Hotel in Ottawa, Ontario.

Round	#	Player	Position	Nationality	College/Junior/Club team
1	3	Jack Johnson	Defense	United States	U.S. National Team Development Program
2	58	Nate Hagemo	Defense	United States	University of Minnesota (WCHA)
3	64	Joe Barnes	Center	Canada	Saskatoon Blades (WHL)
4	94	Jakub Vojta	Defense	Czech Republic	HC Sparta Praha Jr. (Czech)
4	123	Ondrej Otcenas	Center/Winger	Slovakia	Trenčín Jr. (Slovakia)
5	145	Tim Kunes	Center	United States	New England Jr. Falcons (EJHL)
5	159	Risto Korhonen	Winger	Finland	Kärpät Jr. (Finnish Jr.)
6	192	Nicolas Blanchard	Center	Canada	Chicoutimi Saguenéens (QMJHL)
7	198	Kyle Lawson	Defense	United States	U.S. National Team Development Program
