= Mike Hasenfratz =

Canadian ice hockey referee (1966–2024)

- Born: June 19, 1966; Regina, Saskatchewan, Canada
- Died: November 24, 2024 (aged 58); Fort Myers, Florida, U.S.
- Occupation: Ice hockey referee
- Years active: 2000–2009; 2011–2014
- Employer: National Hockey League

Michael Edgar Hasenfratz (June 19, 1966 – November 24, 2024) was a Canadian ice hockey referee. He worked in the National Hockey League (NHL) from the 2000–01 season until his retirement following the 2014–15 season, officiating 705 regular season games. He wore uniform number 30 until the 2011–12 season, wearing number 2 for the remainder of his career. He previously worked 18 years in the Western Hockey League (WHL), refereed at two Memorial Cups, and was a linesman at the 1991 World Junior Ice Hockey Championships. He received the Allen Paradice Memorial Trophy as the WHL's official of the year in the 1999–2000 season.

== Early life ==
Michael Edgar Hasenfratz was born on June 19, 1966, in Regina, Saskatchewan. (Note: Michael Edgar Hasenfratz was born on June 19, 1966. Full name: Michael Edgar Hasenfratz Mike Hasenfratz was born on June 19, 1966, in Regina, Saskatchewan.) He was the son of Agnes and Tony Hasenfratz, and had two sisters. Attending Dr. Martin LeBoldus High School, he played golf and football. (Note: Played golf at LeBoldus High School. Played football at LeBoldus High School.) He also played minor ice hockey in Regina, where his father organized tournaments. (Note: Tony Hasenfratz became chairman of the annual Downtowners Optimist Centennial Cup tournament in 1981, an event for minor ice hockey teams.)

== Officiating career ==
Hasenfratz began refereeing minor hockey at age 13, and began working as a linesman in the Western Hockey League (WHL) at age 16. He subsequently quit playing hockey, and also officiated in senior ice hockey, and the Saskatchewan Junior Hockey League. He worked the 1989 Memorial Cup in Saskatoon as a linesman, then attended the annual National Hockey League (NHL) training camp for the best young officials in 1990. Rated as one of the top linesmen by the Canadian Amateur Hockey Association, he was chosen to officiate at the 1991 World Junior Ice Hockey Championships hosted in Saskatchewan. He worked the Soviet Union vs. United States game. During the game when he first tried to blow his whistle, nothing happened since it had frozen.

Switching from being a linesman, Hasenfratz began the 1990–91 WHL season as a referee. After half a season, he reverted to his former role as he felt that he could realize his dream of reaching the NHL quicker as a linesman than as a referee. In 1991, he relocated to British Columbia to become a full-time official and worked western division games in the WHL.

The NHL had since named Hasenfratz to its referee training program, where he worked at least one week per month under direct NHL supervision while officiating minor league games. In 1993, the ten trainees, including Hasenfratz, all declined offers to be replacement referees if the NHL officials went on strike. Not wanting to be a strikebreaker, he was determined to instead earn his way into the NHL. He continued to work games in the WHL in addition to games in the International Hockey League. Hasenfratz respected the strike by NHL officials, since "they fought for what [he] wanted to have in the future".

Hasenfratz refereed at the 1995 Memorial Cup in Kamloops, and the 1998 Memorial Cup in Spokane. In 1997, the NHL dropped Hasenfratz from its trainee program. He contemplated retirement, but chose to continue in hopes of working at the 2001 Memorial Cup in Regina. He refereed the 1998 WHL All-Star Game in Regina, and received the Allen Paradice Memorial Trophy as the league's official of the year in the 1999–2000 season.

In July 2000, Hasenfratz signed an officiating contract with the NHL, expecting to work mostly American Hockey League games for the 2000–01 season. He had worked 18 years as an official in the WHL: eight as a linesman, and ten as a referee. His style of refereeing in the WHL was described by coach Lorne Molleken as, he "used to kind of soar around the ice like a big eagle".

=== National Hockey League ===
Hasenfratz made his NHL debut during the October 21, 2000, game between the New York Islanders and the Washington Capitals at the MCI Center. His other crew members included referee Paul Stewart, and linesmen Gord Broseker and Pat Dapuzzo. In the 2000–01 season, Hasenfratz was one of three NHL referees who originated from Regina, together with Mick McGeough and Brad Watson. Hasenfratz's first playoff assignment was game two of the 2002 Western Conference quarterfinals between the Vancouver Canucks and the Detroit Red Wings. He was assigned as the standby official for the game, filling in for an injured Greg Devorski.

Hasenfratz worked game three of the 2008 Eastern Conference quarterfinals between the New York Rangers and the New Jersey Devils, in which an incident between Rangers forward Sean Avery and Devils goaltender Martin Brodeur led to an immediate adjustment of the NHL's unsportsmanlike conduct rule. The adjustment became known as "the Avery Rule".

Prior to the start of the 2009–10 season, Hasenfratz discovered he had an aortic aneurysm. It devolved into an aortic dissection that required emergency surgery. He had open-heart surgery at the Cleveland Clinic. In a subsequent surgery, excess fluid was drained near his heart which caused a collapsed lung. He declined to retire from refereeing and receive a disability pension.

After missing two seasons, Hasenfratz made his regular season return at the MTS Centre for the November 19, 2011, game between the Philadelphia Flyers and the Winnipeg Jets. Upon returning to the NHL, he changed to uniform number 2, to signify getting a second chance after two surgeries, and for having the "world's second-best job, right after playing". He had previously worn uniform number 30, while number 2 was last worn by Kerry Fraser.

Hasenfratz worked his final game on March 16, 2014, between the Philadelphia Flyers and the Pittsburgh Penguins at the CONSOL Energy Center. His crew members included referee Mike Leggo, and linesmen Tim Nowak and Derek Amell. He missed the 2014–15 season due to health issues before retiring, after officiating 705 regular season games.

== Personal life and death ==
Hasenfratz was a third-generation police officer in his family. (Note: Tony Hasenfratz was an inspector with the Regina Police Service.) In September 1991, he resigned as a constable with the Regina Police Service to follow a full-time career officiating ice hockey. He moved to Burnaby, British Columbia, in August 1991, and appeared as an extra in a hockey fight scene in the 1992 film Stay Tuned. He also briefly worked as a private investigator.

His father was disappointed when Hasenfratz resigned from the police to pursue an officiating dream. He achieved the goal in July 2000, but his father died earlier in the year in February. His mother had died in 1998.

Married three times, Hasenfratz had a daughter and a son. He moved to the Nashville, Tennessee, area in 2000, remaining there for the rest of his life. He was nicknamed "Hazy" by his fellow officials.

Hasenfratz died on November 24, 2024, in Fort Myers, Florida, at age 58.

== See also ==
- List of NHL on-ice officials
