= Scott Driscoll (disambiguation) =

Scott Driscoll is a politician and businessman.

Scott Driscoll may also refer to:

- Scott Driscoll (linesman), Canadian hockey linesman
- Scott Driscoll (figure skater) in 1984 United States Figure Skating Championships
