= List of Carolina Hurricanes award winners =

Carolina Hurricanes awards
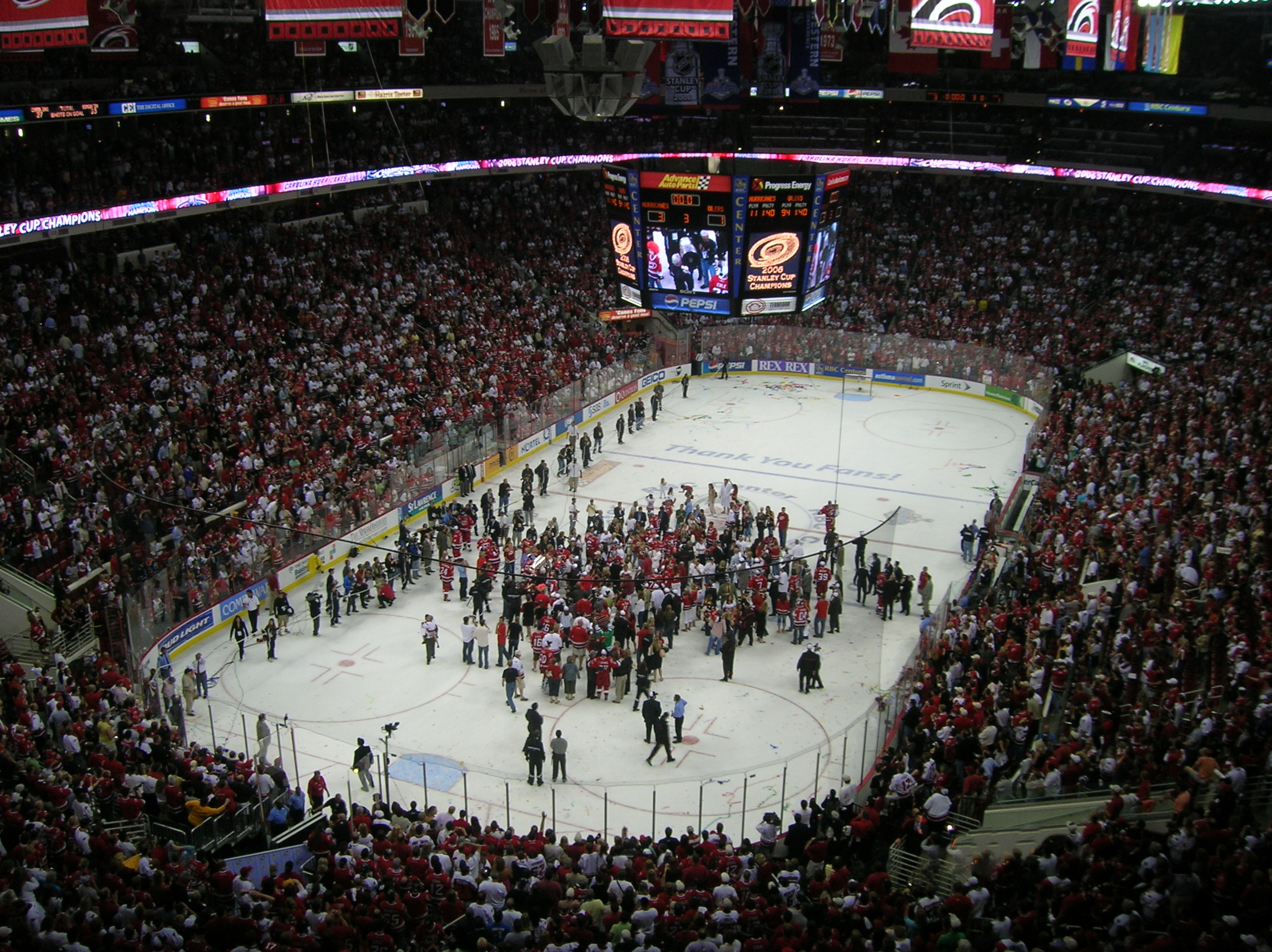
- The celebration on the ice after the Hurricanes won the Stanley Cup in 2006.

Team trophies
- Award*: Wins
- Stanley Cup: 2
- Prince of Wales Trophy: 3

Individual awards
- Award*: Wins
- Bill Masterton Memorial Trophy: 1
- Calder Memorial Trophy: 1
- Conn Smythe Trophy: 2
- Frank J. Selke Trophy: 2
- Jack Adams Award: 1
- King Clancy Memorial Trophy: 1
- Lady Byng Memorial Trophy: 3
- Lester Patrick Trophy: 9
- NHL Foundation Player Award: 1
- NHL Man of the Year Award: 1
- William M. Jennings Trophy: 1

Total
- Awards won: 28

This is a list of Carolina Hurricanes award winners. It also includes players and data from the previous incarnation of the franchise, the Hartford Whalers.

== League awards ==
=== Team trophies ===
Team trophies awarded to the Carolina Hurricanes franchise
Award	Description	Times won	Seasons	References
Stanley Cup	NHL championship	2	2005–06, 2025–26	
Prince of Wales Trophy	Eastern Conference playoff championship	3	2001–02, 2005–06, 2025–26	
Avco World Trophy (WHA)	WHA championship	1	1972–73	

=== Individual awards ===
Individual awards won by Carolina Hurricanes franchise players and staff
Award	Description	Winner	Season	References
Ben Hatskin Trophy (WHA)	Top goaltender	Al Smith	1977–78	
Bill Masterton Memorial Trophy	Perseverance, sportsmanship and dedication to hockey	Doug Jarvis	1986–87	
Calder Memorial Trophy	Rookie of the year	Jeff Skinner	2010–11	
Conn Smythe Trophy	Most valuable player of the playoffs	Cam Ward	2005–06	
Conn Smythe Trophy	Most valuable player of the playoffs	Jordan Staal	2025–26	
Dennis A. Murphy Trophy (WHA)	Top defenseman	Rick Ley	1978–79	
Frank J. Selke Trophy	Forward who best excels in the defensive aspect of the game	Rod Brind'Amour	2005–06	
Frank J. Selke Trophy	Forward who best excels in the defensive aspect of the game	Rod Brind'Amour	2006–07	
Howard Baldwin Trophy (WHA)	Coach of the year	Jack Kelley	1972–73	
Jack Adams Award	Top coach during the regular season	Rod Brind'Amour	2020–21	
King Clancy Memorial Trophy	Leadership qualities on and off the ice and humanitarian contributions within their community	Ron Francis	2001–02	
Lady Byng Memorial Trophy	Gentlemanly conduct	Ron Francis	2001–02	
Lady Byng Memorial Trophy	Gentlemanly conduct	Jaccob Slavin	2020–21	
Lady Byng Memorial Trophy	Gentlemanly conduct	Jaccob Slavin	2023–24	
Lou Kaplan Trophy (WHA)	Rookie of the year	Terry Caffery	1972–73	
Lou Kaplan Trophy (WHA)	Rookie of the year	George Lyle	1976–77	
NHL Foundation Player Award	Community service	Ron Francis	2001–02	
NHL Man of the Year Award	Sportsmanship and involvement with charitable groups	Kevin Dineen	1990–91	
Paul Deneau Trophy (WHA)	Player who displays gentlemanly conduct	Dave Keon	1976–77	
Paul Deneau Trophy (WHA)	Player who displays gentlemanly conduct	Dave Keon	1977–78	
William M. Jennings Trophy	Fewest goals given up in the regular season (1981–present)	Frederik Andersen	2021–22	
William M. Jennings Trophy	Fewest goals given up in the regular season (1981–present)	Antti Raanta	2021–22	

== All-Stars ==
=== WHA First, Second and Third Team All-Stars ===
New England Whalers selected to the WHA First, Second and Third Team All-Stars
Player	Position	Selections	Season	Team
Jim Dorey	Defense	1	1972–73	2nd
Ted Green	Defense	1	1972–73	3rd
Mark Howe	Left wing	1	1978–79	1st
Rick Ley	Defense	3	1972–73	3rd
Rick Ley	Defense	3	1977–78	2nd
Rick Ley	Defense	3	1978–79	1st
Al Smith	Goaltender	2	1972–73	3rd
Al Smith	Goaltender	2	1977–78	1st
Tom Webster	Right wing	1	1972–73	2nd

=== NHL first and second team All-Stars ===
The NHL first and second team All-Stars are the top players at each position as voted on by the Professional Hockey Writers' Association.

Carolina Hurricanes franchise players selected to the NHL First and Second Team All-Stars
Player	Position	Selections	Season	Team
Dougie Hamilton	Defense	1	2020–21	2nd
Mike Liut	Goaltender	1	1986–87	2nd
Eric Staal	Center	1	2005–06	2nd

=== NHL All-Rookie Team ===
The NHL All-Rookie Team consists of the top rookies at each position as voted on by the Professional Hockey Writers' Association.

Carolina Hurricanes franchise players selected to the NHL All-Rookie Team
Player	Position	Season
Justin Faulk	Defense	2011–12
Pyotr Kochetkov	Goaltender	2023–24
Dana Murzyn	Defense	1985–86
Alex Nedeljkovic	Goaltender	2020–21
Alexander Nikishin	Defense	2025–26
Chris Pronger	Defense	1993–94
Brad Shaw	Defense	1989–90
Peter Sidorkiewicz	Goaltender	1988–89
Jeff Skinner	Forward	2010–11
Sylvain Turgeon	Forward	1983–84
Shane Willis	Forward	2000–01

=== All-Star Game selections ===
The National Hockey League All-Star Game is a mid-season exhibition game held annually between many of the top players of each season. Thirty-three All-Star Games have been held since the Carolina Hurricanes entered the NHL as the Hartford Whalers in 1979, with at least one player chosen to represent the franchise in each year except 1998, 2004 and 2012. The All-Star game has not been held in various years: 1979 and 1987 due to the 1979 Challenge Cup and Rendez-vous '87 series between the NHL and the Soviet national team, respectively, 1995, 2005, and 2013 as a result of labor stoppages, 2006, 2010, 2014 and 2026 because of the Winter Olympic Games, 2021 as a result of the COVID-19 pandemic, and 2025 when it was replaced by the 2025 4 Nations Face-Off. The franchise has hosted two of the games. Hartford hosted the 38th at the PeoplesBank Arena, then known as the Hartford Civic Center, and Carolina hosted the 58th at Lenovo Center, then known as the RBC Center.

- † Selected by fan vote
- ↑ All-Star Game Most Valuable Player

Carolina Hurricanes franchise players and coaches selected to the All-Star Game
Game	Year	Name	Position	References
WHA 1st	1973	Terry Caffery	Center	
WHA 1st	1973	Jim Dorey	Defense	
WHA 1st	1973	Rick Ley	Defense	
WHA 1st	1973	Larry Pleau	Center	
WHA 1st	1973	Al Smith	Goaltender	
WHA 1st	1973	Tom Webster	Right wing	
WHA 1st	1973	Jack Kelley	Coach	
WHA 2nd	1974	Jim Dorey	Defense	
WHA 2nd	1974	Hugh Harris	Left wing	
WHA 2nd	1974	Rick Ley	Defense	
WHA 2nd	1974	Larry Pleau	Center	
WHA 2nd	1974	Brad Selwood	Defense	
WHA 2nd	1974	Al Smith	Goaltender	
WHA 2nd	1974	Tom Webster	Right wing	
WHA 2nd	1974	Jack Kelley	Coach	
WHA 3rd	1975	Rick Ley	Defense	
WHA 3rd	1975	Larry Pleau	Center	
WHA 3rd	1975	Brad Selwood	Defense	
WHA 3rd	1975	Al Smith	Goaltender	
WHA 3rd	1975	Tom Webster	Right wing	
WHA 3rd	1975	Ron Ryan	Coach	
WHA 4th	1976	Christer Abrahamsson	Goaltender	
WHA 4th	1976	Wayne Carleton	Left wing	
WHA 4th	1976	Rick Ley	Defense	
WHA 4th	1976	Tom Webster	Right wing	
WHA 5th	1977	Thommy Abrahamsson	Defense	
WHA 5th	1977	Ralph Backstrom	Center	
WHA 5th	1977	George Lyle	Left wing	
WHA 5th	1977	Gordie Roberts	Defense	
WHA 5th	1977	Mike Rogers	Center	
WHA 6th	1978	Mike Antonovich	Left wing	
WHA 6th	1978	Gordie Howe	Center	
WHA 6th	1978	Mark Howe↑	Left wing	
WHA 6th	1978	Rick Ley	Defense	
WHA 6th	1978	Gordie Roberts	Defense	
WHA 6th	1978	Al Smith	Goaltender	
WHA 7th	1979	Gordie Howe	Right wing	
WHA 7th	1979	Mark Howe	Left wing	
WHA 7th	1979	Rick Ley	Defense	
WHA 7th	1979	Dave Keon	Center	
32nd	1980	Gordie Howe	Right wing	
33rd	1981	Mark Howe	Defense	
33rd	1981	Mike Rogers	Center	
34th	1982	Blaine Stoughton	Right wing	
35th	1983	Ron Francis	Center	
36th	1984	Mark Johnson	Center	
37th	1985	Ron Francis	Center	
38th	1986	Ron Francis (Did not play)	Center	
38th	1986	Sylvain Turgeon	Left wing	
39th	1988	Kevin Dineen†	Right wing	
40th	1989	Kevin Dineen	Right wing	
41st	1990	Ron Francis	Center	
42nd	1991	Pat Verbeek	Left wing	
43rd	1992	John Cullen	Center	
44th	1993	Zarley Zalapski	Defense	
45th	1994	Geoff Sanderson	Left wing	
46th	1996	Brendan Shanahan†	Left wing	
47th	1997	Geoff Sanderson	Left wing	
48th	1998	No Hurricanes selected	—	
49th	1999	Arturs Irbe	Goaltender	
49th	1999	Keith Primeau	Center	
50th	2000	Sami Kapanen	Left wing	
51st	2001	Sandis Ozolinsh†	Defense	
52nd	2002	Sami Kapanen	Left wing	
53rd	2003	Jeff O'Neill	Right wing	
54th	2004	No Hurricanes selected	—	
55th	2007	Eric Staal	Center	
55th	2007	Justin Williams	Right wing	
56th	2008	Eric Staal↑	Center	
57th	2009	Eric Staal	Center	
58th	2011	Jeff Skinner	Right wing	
58th	2011	Eric Staal	Center	
58th	2011	Cam Ward	Goaltender	
59th	2012	No Hurricanes selected	—	
60th	2015	Justin Faulk	Defense	
61st	2016	Justin Faulk	Defense	
62nd	2017	Justin Faulk	Defense	
63rd	2018	Noah Hanifin	Defense	
64th	2019	Sebastian Aho	Right wing	
65th	2020	Dougie Hamilton (Did not play)	Defense	
65th	2020	Jaccob Slavin (Replaced Hamilton)	Defense	
66th	2022	Sebastian Aho	Right wing	
66th	2022	Frederik Andersen	Goaltender	
66th	2022	Rod Brind'Amour	Coach	
67th	2023	Rod Brind'Amour	Coach	
67th	2023	Andrei Svechnikov	Right wing	
68th	2024	Sebastian Aho	Right wing	

=== All-Star Game replacement events ===
Hartford Whalers players and coaches selected to All-Star Game replacement events
Event	Year	Name	Position	References
Rendez-vous '87	1987	Kevin Dineen	Right wing	
Rendez-vous '87	1987	Ulf Samuelsson	Defense	
4 Nations Face-Off	2025	Sebastian Aho (Finland)	Center	
4 Nations Face-Off	2025	Seth Jarvis (Canada)	Center	
4 Nations Face-Off	2025	Mikko Rantanen (Finland)	Right wing	
4 Nations Face-Off	2025	Jaccob Slavin (United States)	Defense	

== Career achievements ==
=== Hockey Hall of Fame ===
The following is a list of Carolina Hurricanes who have been enshrined in the Hockey Hall of Fame.

Carolina Hurricanes franchise players and personnel inducted into the Hockey Hall of Fame
Individual	Category	Year inducted	Years with Hurricanes franchise in category	References
Tom Barrasso	Player	2023	2001-2002	
Brian Burke	Builder	2026	1992-1993	
Paul Coffey	Player	2004	1996, 1998–2000	
Emile Francis	Builder	1982	1983–1993	
Ron Francis	Player	2007	1981–1991, 1998–2004	
Gordie Howe	Player	1972	1977–1980	
Mark Howe	Player	2011	1977–1982	
Bobby Hull	Player	1983	1980	
Peter Karmanos Jr.	Builder	2015	1994–present	
Dave Keon	Player	1986	1977–1982	
Chris Pronger	Player	2015	1993–1995	
Mark Recchi	Player	2017	2006	
Jim Rutherford	Builder	2019	1994–2014	
Brendan Shanahan	Player	2013	1995–1996	

=== Foster Hewitt Memorial Award ===
Two members of the Carolina Hurricanes organization has been honored with the Foster Hewitt Memorial Award. The award is presented by the Hockey Hall of Fame to members of the radio and television industry who make outstanding contributions to their profession and the game of ice hockey during their broadcasting career.

Members of the Carolina Hurricanes honored with the Foster Hewitt Memorial Award
Individual	Year honored	Years with Hurricanes franchise as broadcaster	References
Chuck Kaiton	2004	1979–2018	
Rick Peckham	2020	1984–1995	
Daryl Reaugh	2025	1995–1996	

=== Lester Patrick Trophy ===
The Lester Patrick Trophy has been presented by the National Hockey League and USA Hockey since 1966 to honor a recipient's contribution to ice hockey in the United States. This list includes all personnel who have ever been employed by the Carolina Hurricanes franchise in any capacity and have also received the Lester Patrick Trophy.

Members of the Carolina Hurricanes franchise honored with the Lester Patrick Trophy
Individual	Year honored	Years with Hurricanes franchise	References
Bob Crocker	2015	1980–1992	
Emile Francis	1982	1983–1993	
Paul Holmgren	2014	1992–1995	
Gordie Howe	1967	1977–1980	
Mark Howe	2016	1977–1982	
Bobby Hull	1969	1980	
Mark Johnson	2011	1982–1985	
Peter Karmanos Jr.	1998	1994–present	
Larry Pleau	2002	1972–1979, 1980–1983, 1988–1989	

=== United States Hockey Hall of Fame ===
Members of the Carolina Hurricanes franchise inducted into the United States Hockey Hall of Fame
Individual	Year inducted	Years with Hurricanes franchise	References
Tom Barrasso	2009	2001–2002	
John Cunniff	2003	1972–1974, 1981–1983	
Mark Fusco	2002	1984–1985	
Kevin Hatcher	2010	2000–2001	
Mark Howe	2003	1977–1982	
Mark Johnson	2004	1982–1985	
Peter Karmanos Jr.	2013	1994–present	
Jack Kelley	1993	1972–1975, 1977–1981	
Larry Pleau	2000	1972–1979, 1980–1983, 1988–1989	
Gordie Roberts	1999	1975–1980	
Timothy Sheehy	1997	1972–1975, 1978, 1979–1980	
Doug Weight	2013	2006	
Tom Williams	1981	1972–1974	
Scott Young	2017	1988–1990	

=== Retired numbers ===
The Carolina Hurricanes have retired four of their jersey numbers and taken two other numbers out of circulation. Prior to the franchise's move to Carolina, the Hartford Whalers retired Rick Ley's number 2, Gordie Howe's number 9, and John McKenzie's number 19. Numbers 2 and 19 were returned to circulation when the franchise moved to Carolina, but the number 9 remains unofficially retired for Howe. The number 3 was removed from circulation following Steve Chiasson's death in 1999. Also out of circulation is the number 99 which was retired league-wide for Wayne Gretzky on February 6, 2000. Gretzky did not play for the Hurricanes franchise during his 20-year NHL career and no player in franchise history had ever worn the number 99 prior to its retirement.

Carolina Hurricanes retired numbers
Number	Player	Position	Years with Hurricanes franchise as a player	Date of retirement ceremony	References
2	Glen Wesley	Defense	1994–2008	February 17, 2009	
10	Ron Francis	Center	1981–1991, 1998–2004	January 28, 2006	
12	Eric Staal	Center	2003–2016	January 12, 2025	
17	Rod Brind'Amour	Center	2000–2010	February 18, 2011	

== Team awards ==
=== Josef Vasicek Award ===
The Josef Vasicek Award is an annual award given by the Carolina chapter of the Professional Hockey Writers' Association for "outstanding cooperation with the local media."

Season	Winner
2000–01	Glen Wesley
2001–02	Arturs Irbe
2002–03	Kevyn Adams
2003–04	Kevyn Adams
2005–06	Aaron Ward
2006–07	Mike Commodore

Season	Winner
2007–08	Cam Ward
2008–09	Tuomo Ruutu
2009–10	Eric Staal
2010–11	Jussi Jokinen
2011–12	Jay Harrison
2012–13	Patrick Dwyer

Season	Winner
2013–14	Jordan Staal
2014–15	Brad Malone
2015–16	Jeff Skinner
2016–17	Justin Faulk
2017–18	Jordan Staal
2018–19	Justin Williams

=== Most Valuable Player ===
The Most Valuable Player award is an annual award given by the Carolina chapter of the Professional Hockey Writers' Association to the team's MVP.

Season	Winner
2000–01	Arturs Irbe
2001–02	Ron Francis
2002–03	Ron Francis
2003–04	Sean Hill
2005–06	Eric Staal
2006–07	Ray Whitney

Season	Winner
2007–08	Eric Staal
2008–09	Cam Ward
2009–10	Jussi Jokinen
2010–11	Cam Ward
2011–12	Eric Staal
2012–13	Justin Faulk

Season	Winner
2013–14	Andrej Sekera
2014–15	Justin Faulk
2015–16	Jordan Staal
2016–17	Jeff Skinner
2017–18	Sebastian Aho
2018–19	Sebastian Aho

=== Steve Chiasson Award ===
The Steve Chiasson Award is an annual award given to the player who "best exemplifies determination and dedication while proving to be an inspiration to his teammates through his performance and approach to the game" as selected by his teammates.

Season	Winner
1999–00	Sean Hill
2000–01	Rod Brind'Amour
2001–02	Ron Francis
2002–03	Kevyn Adams
2003–04	Sean Hill
2005–06	Rod Brind'Amour
2006–07	Rod Brind'Amour
2007–08	Bret Hedican

Season	Winner
2008–09	Rod Brind'Amour
2009–10	Rod Brind'Amour
2010–11	Tim Gleason
2011–12	Eric Staal
2012–13	Tim Gleason
2013–14	Manny Malhotra
2014–15	Jordan Staal
2015–16	Jay McClement

Season	Winner
2016–17	Bryan Bickell
2017–18	Jordan Staal
2018–19	Justin Williams
2019–20	Andrei Svechnikov
2020–21	Jordan Staal
2021–22	Jesper Fast

== See also ==
- List of National Hockey League awards
