= Mick McGeough =

Canadian ice hockey official (1956–2018)

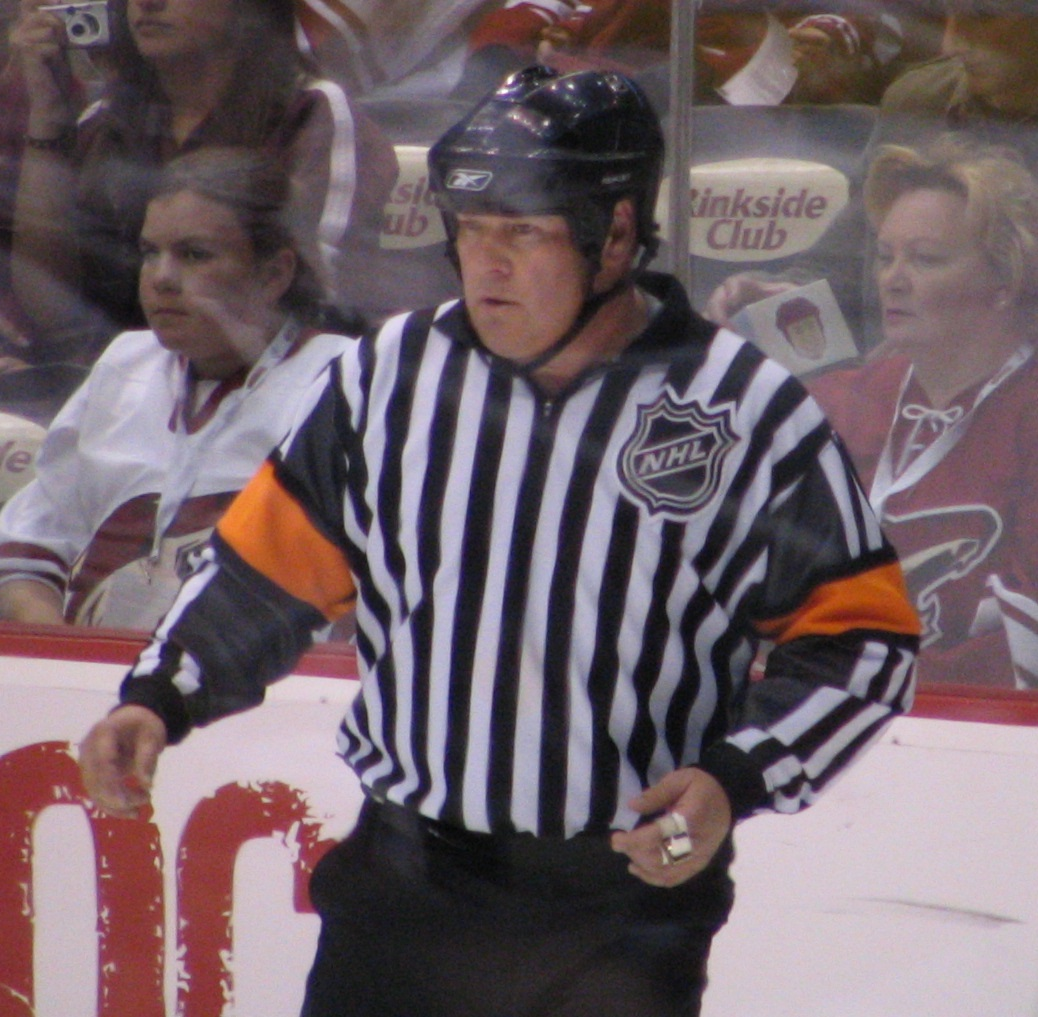
- Mick McGeough officiating a game between the Colorado Avalanche and Phoenix Coyotes at Jobing.com Arena in 2007
- Born: Michael Francis McGeough; June 20, 1956; Regina, Saskatchewan, Canada
- Died: November 23, 2018 (aged 62); Regina, Saskatchewan, Canada
- Occupation: Former NHL referee

Michael Francis McGeough (/mɪkˈɡuː/ mik-GOO; June 20, 1956 – November 23, 2018) was an ice hockey referee, who officiated in the National Hockey League (NHL), wearing number 19 from the 1994–95 NHL season until his 2008 retirement.

== Career ==
His NHL career began in 1987. McGeough was one of the last NHL officials to officiate games without wearing a helmet on the ice. McGeough was the last participant of an NHL game to not wear a helmet when he officiated Game 5 of the 2006 Stanley Cup Final. In the 2006–07 season, McGeough began to wear a helmet on ice, as it was the first season which dictated all on-ice officials had to do so.

After officiating 1,083 regular season games, 63 playoff games, and the 2006 Stanley Cup Finals, his final career regular season game was the Anaheim Ducks – Los Angeles Kings contest on April 5, 2008.

In retirement, he began helping the NHL bring up new referee recruits from the American Hockey League and was named to the Saskatchewan Hockey Hall of Fame in 2013.

Mick was the older brother of NHL-player Jim McGeough, formerly of the Pittsburgh Penguins and the Washington Capitals, as well as ex-Canadian Junior football player and coach, Tim McGeough.

== Controversies and other incidents ==
After giving up the game-winning goal to the Ottawa Senators' Rob Zamuner during Game 3 of first round of the 2000 Stanley Cup Playoffs, an irate Toronto Maple Leafs goaltender Curtis Joseph charged after McGeough to argue that goaltender interference should have been called. Joseph then stumbled and bumped the referee to the ice. A misconduct penalty was called on Joseph, but he was not ejected from the game, and the NHL later decided not to suspend him.

In a regular season game between the Dallas Stars and the Edmonton Oilers on November 4, 2006, with the Stars up 3–2 with 4.1 seconds left in regulation, McGeough waved off what would have been a game-tying goal by Edmonton's Ales Hemsky, ruling that Oilers' centre Shawn Horcoff had made a glove pass prior to Hemsky touching the puck. Replays however clearly showed there was no infraction. The Stars ended up winning the game, as angry fans at Rexall Place littered the ice with debris. The NHL later admitted that the call was wrong, but also fined Oilers head coach Craig MacTavish US$10,000 for his post-game comments in which he said that McGeough's call was "retarded" and that he should be suspended.

During a regular season game between the Ottawa Senators and the St. Louis Blues on March 20, 2007, there were two controversial calls late in the third period that both disallowed a game-tying goal by the Blues. At 3:14 of the third period, Ottawa goaltender Martin Gerber appeared to have stopped a shot by St. Louis' Brad Boyes. Replays later showed that the puck actually crossed the goal line before Gerber pulled it back to smother it, but play was immediately resumed without a video review. It was only after 33 seconds of play later that the timekeeper blew the horn to signal a video review. McGeough then admitted that the goal should have counted, but he could not reverse the call due to Rule 78.6 which states that a goal cannot be awarded once the play has resumed. The second disputed goal occurred with 2:18 left in the game: the Blues' David Backes appeared to have scored in the same manner, with the puck entering the net before Gerber pulled it back. But McGeough disallowed the goal, ruling that Backes pushed Gerber's glove across the goal line with his stick after the goaltender had possession of the puck.

== Death ==
On the morning of November 18, 2018, McGeough was admitted to the hospital in Regina, Saskatchewan with early signs of a stroke. After his condition worsened, McGeough sought a consultation with a neurosurgeon in Saskatoon to remove clots at the back of his brain. After it was determined the damage was ultimately irreversible, he returned home to spend his remaining days with his family and to "go on his own terms".

Four days later, on November 23, it was announced by his family that McGeough had been removed from life support and died late that night at the age of 62.

In the 2018-19 NHL season, referees honoured McGeough by wearing a jersey arm patch with the word “MICK”.
