= Kerry Fraser =

Canadian ice hockey official

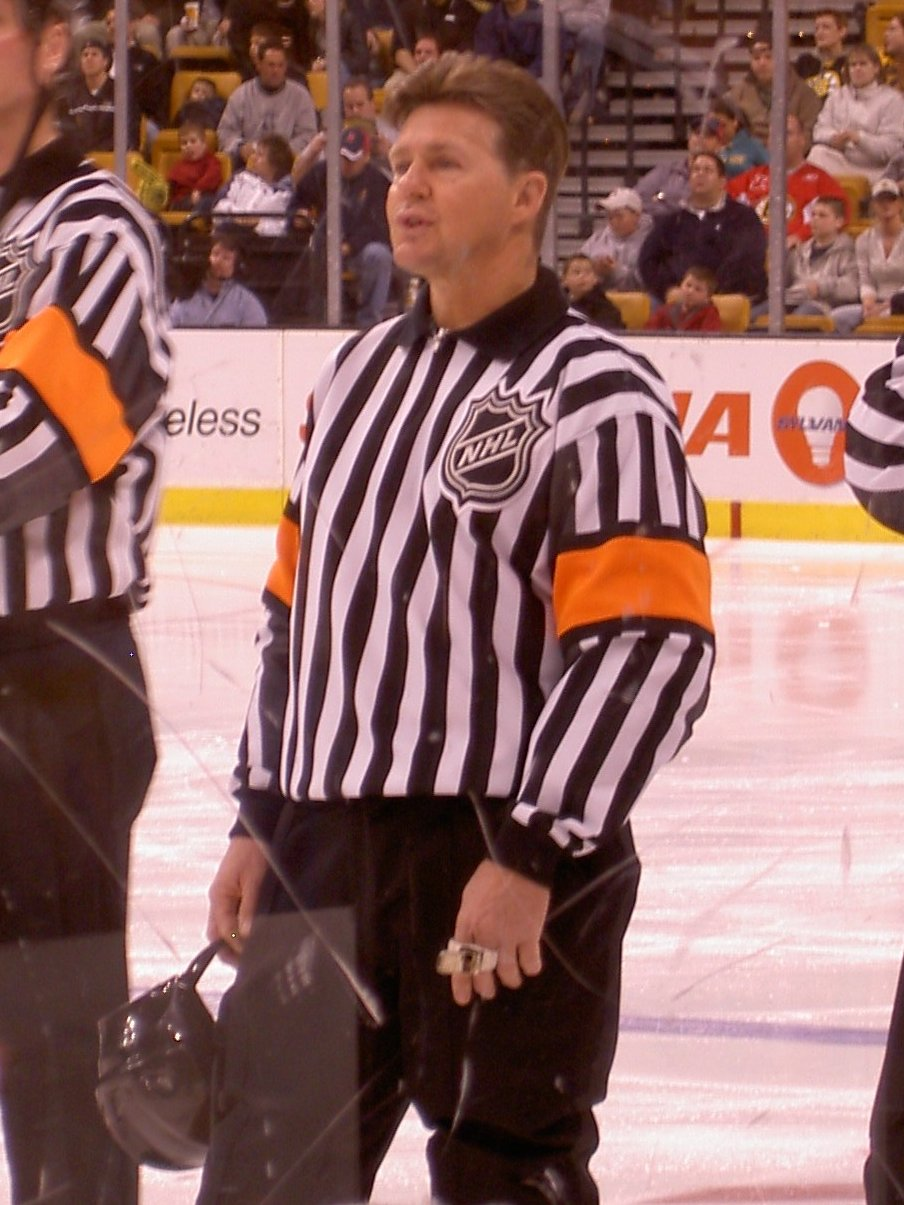
- Fraser in 2007
- Born: May 30, 1952 (age 74); Sarnia, Ontario, Canada
- Occupation: NHL official (1973–2010)
- Children: 7

Kerry Fraser on Bookbits radio.

Kerry Fraser (born May 30, 1952) is a hockey analyst, broadcaster and former senior referee in the National Hockey League. During his career, he called 1,904 regular season games, 12 Stanley Cup Finals, and over 261 Stanley Cup playoff games.

== Career ==
Fraser joined the National Hockey League Officials Association on September 1, 1973, and officiated his first game in the 1980–81 season. Beginning in the 1994–95 season, he wore uniform number 2. He would continue to wear this number until his retirement from officiating. He was also one of the last three NHL officials covered by the grandfather clause that allowed him to go without a helmet, thus allowing his signature bouffant hairstyle to be seen.

In 1993, Fraser did not give Wayne Gretzky a penalty for a high stick on the Maple Leafs' Doug Gilmour in game 6 of the Campbell Conference Final. With Gilmour off the ice getting stitches for the resulting wound, Gretzky scored the game winning goal and the Kings won game 7.

Fraser officiated at the 1996 World Cup of Hockey and the 1998 Winter Olympics in Nagano, Japan, which was the first Olympic tournament to feature NHL participation.

Fraser missed the beginning of the 2006–07 season while recovering from an incident in September 2006. He was helping his daughter move and was carrying a television down the steps when he lost his footing; his big toe was shattered. Before returning to referee NHL games, Fraser officiated some AHL games alongside his son, Ryan. In November 2006, TSN's James Duthie, along with Kerry Fraser, created a short mock interview/documentary claiming that Fraser missed the start of the season because he was afraid that wearing a helmet would mess up his hair as the ratification of the new NHL Officials Association collective bargaining agreement on March 21, 2006 required all remaining helmet-less officials to wear one. Fraser's first game back with the NHL was a game between the Tampa Bay Lightning and Boston Bruins on November 30, 2006. Fraser has the odd rarity of calling games in Atlanta for both the Atlanta Flames and the Atlanta Thrashers, in the OMNI and Philips Arena.

Fraser retired from officiating after the NHL's 2009–10 season, working his last game on April 11, 2010, in Philadelphia as the Philadelphia Flyers hosted the New York Rangers at the Wachovia Center, which is the closest NHL arena to his residence in New Jersey. Also during the season, he worked a number of important games as the league's most senior referee, including the 2010 Winter Classic. He followed retirement by releasing an autobiography, The Final Call: Hockey Stories from a Legend in Stripes.

== Broadcasting ==
Fraser continues his involvement in the NHL community by participating in a TSN.ca blog named "C'Mon Ref!" where he applies his NHL referee experience to controversial calls in current NHL games. Fraser also serves as analyst on TSN's hockey highlight show, That's Hockey 2Nite.

== Personal life ==
At just 5 feet 7 inches (1.70 m) tall, Fraser says that his height contributed to his longevity in the league by forcing him to "develop techniques to ... avoid being hit" Fraser's father, Hilton "Hilt" Fraser, was a huge influence on his son's career having him skating at 15 months old, chasing pucks at 11, and refereeing by age 15.

In 1995, Fraser was received into the Roman Catholic Church.

On November 3, 2017, it was announced via NHL.com that Fraser has been diagnosed with a rare, incurable blood disorder called essential thrombocythemia.

== Awards and accolades ==
Fraser currently holds the record for most NHL regular season games refereed, although he was second to Bill McCreary in playoff games refereed. He was voted the "most consistent" referee in a December 2005 poll of NHL players by The Hockey News.

Fraser was awarded the 2007 Special Achievement Award by the Philadelphia Sports Writers Association. In 2009, Fraser was named to the Ontario Minor Hockey Association's All-Time team as a referee. A banner was raised at the home arena of the Ontario Hockey League's Sarnia Sting in his hometown to mark the honour.
