= Jay Sharrers =

Canadian ice hockey official (born 1967)

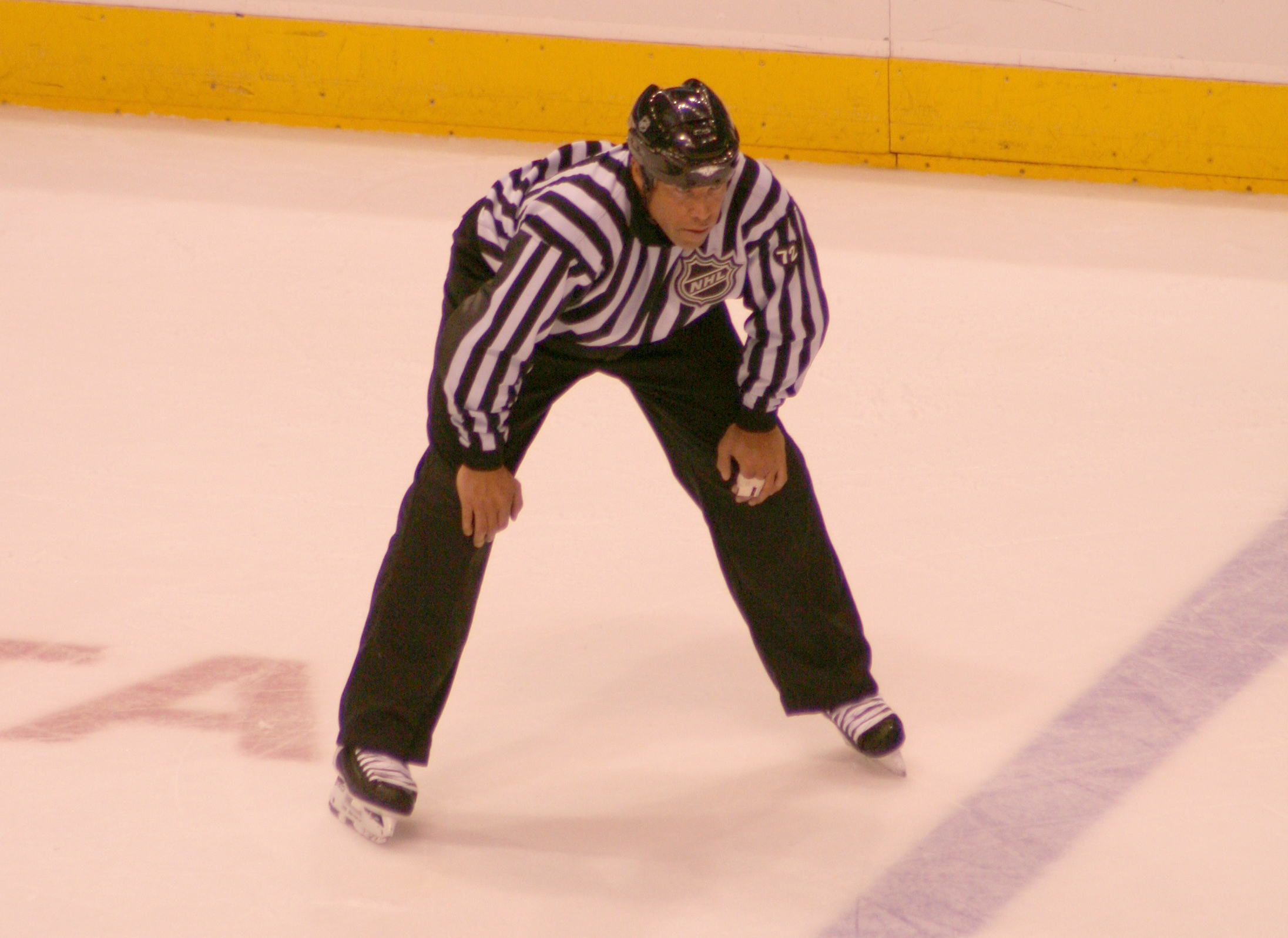
- Born: July 3, 1967 (age 59); Hope, British Columbia, Canada
- Occupation: Ice hockey linesman
- Years active: 1990–2017
- Employer: National Hockey League

Jay Sharrers (born July 3, 1967) is a Canadian former ice hockey linesman, and a one-time referee, in the National Hockey League (NHL) who wore uniform number 57. As of March 2010, Sharrers had officiated 1064 regular season games and 127 playoff games as the first black NHL referee. Sharrers began in the NHL in 1990 and has worked the Stanley Cup Final in 1999, 2000, 2006, 2007, 2008, 2011 and 2013 and the 2010 Winter Olympics.
