= Jean Morin (ice hockey) =

Canadian ice hockey official

- Born: August 10, 1963 (age 61); Sorel-Tracy, Quebec, Canada
- Position: Linesman
- Playing career: 1991–2015

Jean Morin (born August 10, 1963) is a Canadian retired National Hockey League linesman who wore uniform number 97.

== Career ==
Morin joined the NHL as an official at the start of the 1991–92 season. During his career, he officiated in the Stanley Cup Finals in 2002, 2006, 2007, 2008, 2009, 2010, 2011, 2012 and the 2002 and 2010 Winter Olympics. He is a vice president of the National Hockey League Officials Association.
