= Tim Peel =

Canadian former professional hockey referee

- Born: April 27, 1966 (age 60); Hampton, New Brunswick, Canada
- Occupation: Ice hockey official
- Years active: 1999–2021

Tim Peel is a Canadian former professional hockey referee for the National Hockey League from 1999 to 2021. During his career, Peel officiated 1,362 regular season games and 90 playoff games, as well as international hockey at the Olympics in 2014. Peel's career ended in controversy following a hot mic incident.

== Career ==
Peel joined the National Hockey League Officials' Association (NHLOA) in 1995 and officiated his first NHL game four years later in 1999 between the Colorado Avalanche and the Ottawa Senators. Peel's first playoff game occurred in the 2002 Stanley Cup Playoffs where he officiated the Arizona Coyotes and the San Jose Sharks on April 17. Peel officiated his 1,000th game on November 14, 2015.

Peel was one of 13 NHL referees who officiated in the 2014 Winter Olympics in Sochi. In addition, he also officiated the 2012 All-Star Game and the 2009 and 2017 NHL Winter Classic.

During his NHL career, Peel was the subject of controversy as early as 2013 following controversial calls in regular season games. In 2015, Peel was suspended one game for meeting hockey blogger Greg Wyshynski at a bar to discuss his work and appearing in a photo next to Wyshynski, holding a shot glass of tequila in the air. In the meeting, Peel acknowledged to Wyshynski that he erred on some of his calls, and suggested that the NHL expects officials to manage games in a particular way.

Peel was fired from the NHL in March 2021 following a hot mic incident, where he was overheard saying "it wasn't much, but I wanted to get a fucking penalty against Nashville early" after penalizing Nashville Predators forward Viktor Arvidsson for tripping. The incident occurred in a conversation between Peel and Arvidsson's teammate Filip Forsberg.

Peel left the NHL having officiated 1,362 regular season games and 90 playoff games.

== Personal life ==
Peel was born in Hampton, New Brunswick, and had adoptive parents. He was raised in a trailer park where he was bullied as a child. He is married and has two children. Peel started to work in IT staffing for Genoa Employment Solutions after his officiating career ended.

Peel started a hockey camp to prepare young referees for professional work as adults, including in the NHL.

In 2023, after an under-10 hockey game, Peel allegedly followed two 17-year-old officials into a dressing room and berated them. His lawyer said that Peel "did nothing improper". Peel was suspended from coaching for 30 days, barred from the referees' room for two years, and placed on probation for two years following the incident. Peel's partnership between his referee camp and the McKenna Scholarship, announced in 2019, was terminated.
