= Paul Devorski =

Canadian ice hockey official (born 1958)

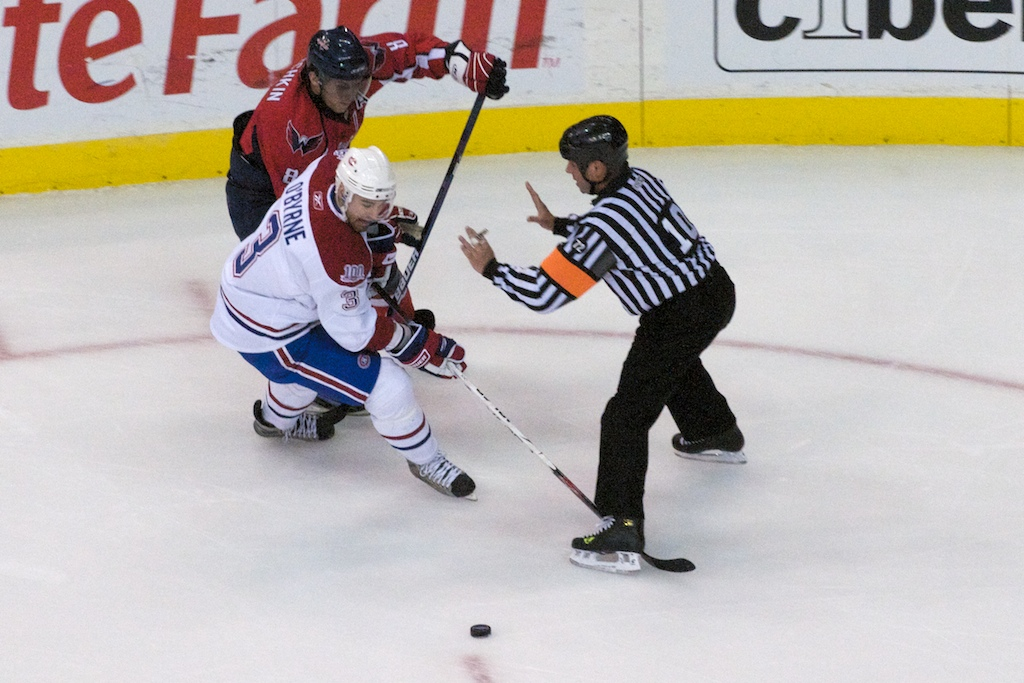
- Devorski in 2008 Preseason Game
- Born: August 18, 1958 (age 67); Guelph, Ontario, Canada
- Occupation: Retired NHL referee

Paul Devorski (born August 18, 1958) is a retired National Hockey League referee, who wore uniform number 10 beginning in the 1994–95 NHL season. He refereed his first NHL game on October 14, 1989, and has been wearing a helmet while refereeing NHL games since the 2005–06 NHL season. He was one of the selected referees who officiated the 2007 Stanley Cup Finals with Dan O'Halloran, and was selected again to officiate the 2008 Stanley Cup Finals along with O'Halloran, as well as the 2009 Stanley Cup Finals alongside Dennis LaRue. He is the older brother of NHL linesman Greg Devorski.

Devorski also officiated several games at the 2010 Vancouver Winter Olympics, including the Bronze Medal Game; 2006 Winter Olympics, including the Men's Gold Medal Game between Sweden and Finland.

Devorski officiated his final NHL game on Sunday, April 5, 2015, in Philadelphia. The contest was between the Pittsburgh Penguins and the Philadelphia Flyers.

Devorski is Canadian of Ukrainian and Irish descent. He is one of eight children born to Ralph William (Bill) and Bernadette Devorski from Guelph, Ontario and is the father of son Luk and daughter Elle. Devorski resides with his family in Harrisburg, Pennsylvania, and enjoys returning to his hometown of Guelph, Ontario, Canada, to visit his family and friends. Along with his 1978 Centennial Cup-winning teammates, Devorski was inducted into the Guelph Sports Hall of Fame, having served as team captain of the Guelph (Holody) Platers when the team defeated the Prince Albert Raiders (SJHL) 4-games-to-none to win the Centennial Cup Championships.
