= Rob Shick =

Canadian ice hockey referee

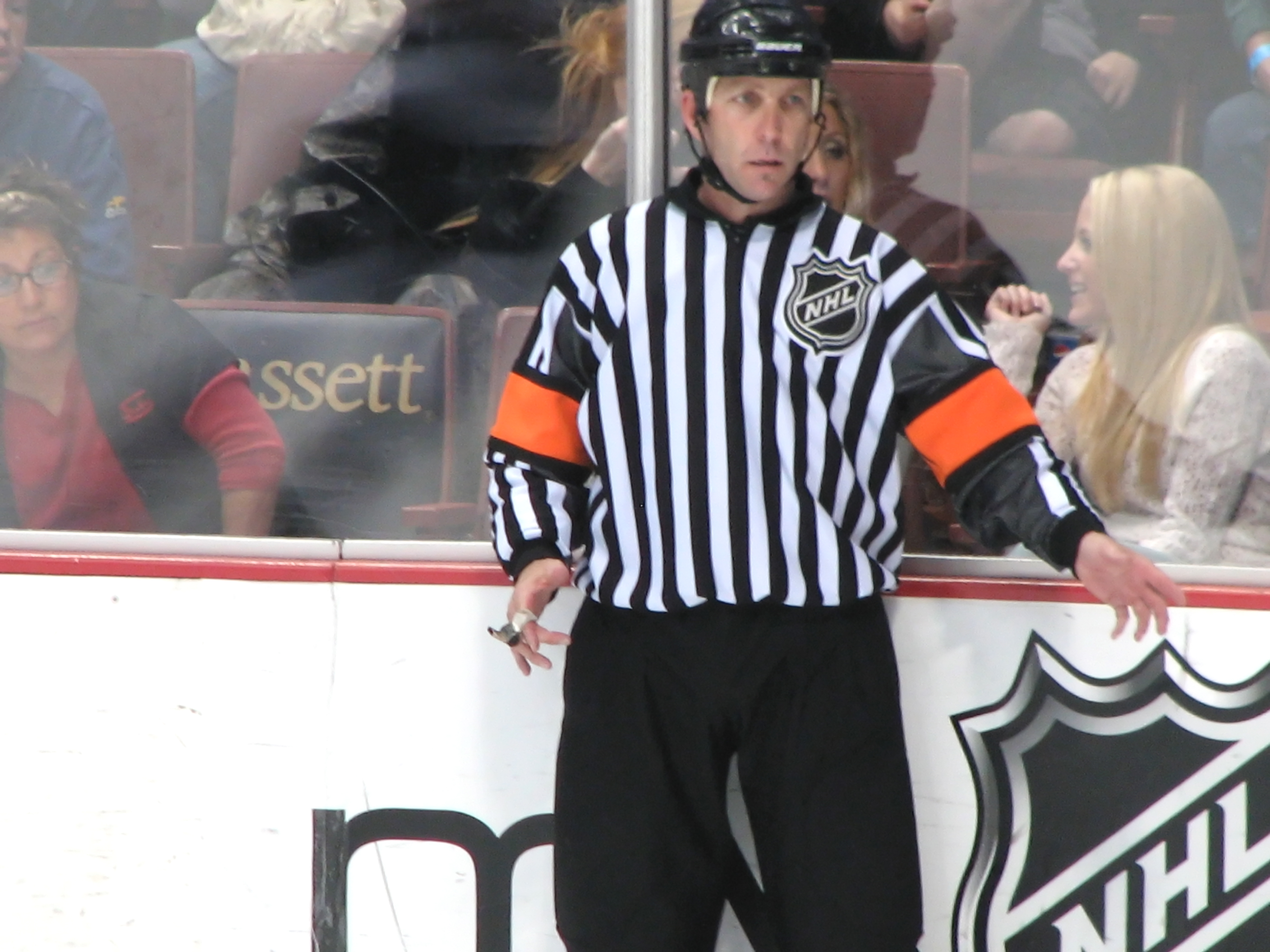
Shick refereeing a game between the Edmonton Oilers and Ducks in 2007

Rob Shick (born December 4, 1957, in Port Alberni, British Columbia) is a retired National Hockey League referee beginning with the 1985–86 NHL season. He retired in March 2009. He wore uniform number 16 since the 1994–95 NHL season. He has been wearing a helmet while refereeing NHL games since the mid-1990s.

Shick refereed his final game on March 7, 2009, at Ronald B. Stafford Arena where the Plattsburgh State Cardinals faced the Norwich Cadets. He refereed over 1,321 NHL regular season games, 130 playoff games, and two All-Star Games during his career. His game worn and signed NHL jersey currently resides in the referee change room in his hometown arena being the Alberni Valley Multiplex.

He is married to Lynda Frye, M.D. He has four children: Austin Frye, Rachel, Landen, and Brodie.
