= Martin Gerber =

Swiss ice hockey player (born 1974)

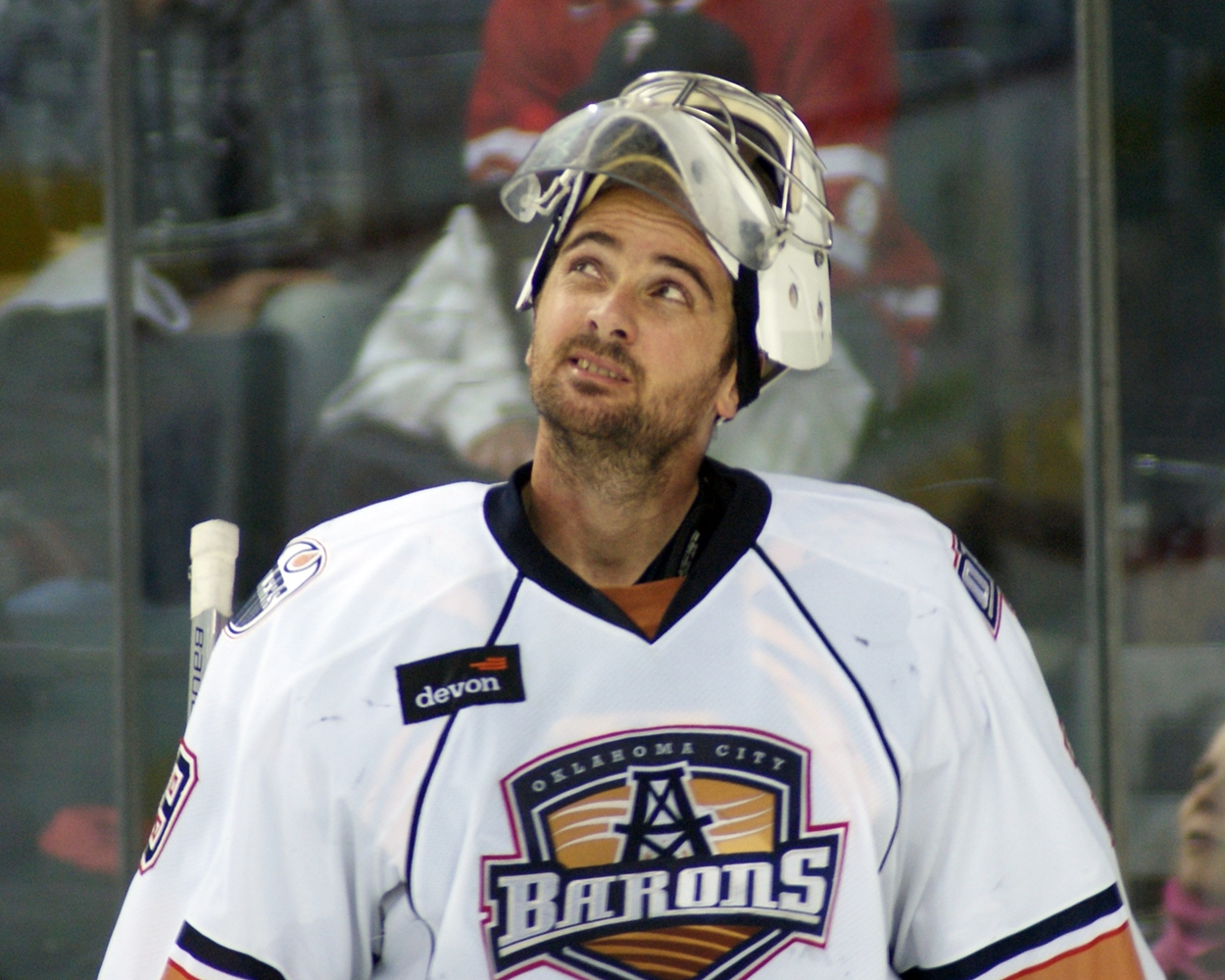
- Gerber with the Oklahoma City Barons in 2011
- Born: 3 September 1974 (age 51) Burgdorf, Switzerland
- Height: 6 ft 0 in (183 cm)
- Weight: 205 lb (93 kg; 14 st 9 lb)
- Position: Goaltender
- Played for: SC Langnau; Färjestad BK; Mighty Ducks of Anaheim; Carolina Hurricanes; Ottawa Senators; Toronto Maple Leafs; Atlant Mytishchi; Edmonton Oilers; Växjö Lakers; Rögle BK; EHC Kloten
- National team: Switzerland
- NHL draft: 232nd overall, 2001; Mighty Ducks of Anaheim
- Playing career: 1994–2017

Martin Gerber (born 3 September 1974) is a Swiss former professional ice hockey goaltender. He was drafted in the eighth round of the 2001 NHL entry draft (232nd overall) by the Mighty Ducks of Anaheim. He played in the National Hockey League (NHL) with the Mighty Ducks, Carolina Hurricanes, Ottawa Senators, Toronto Maple Leafs, and Edmonton Oilers, winning the Stanley Cup as a member of the Hurricanes in 2006. Following the 2011–12 season, he played two seasons in the Swedish Elitserien before returning to the Swiss NLA, finishing his playing career with the Kloten Flyers.

== Playing career ==
Gerber began his career in his native Switzerland for SC Langnau. Initially playing in the Nationalliga B, Gerber and the Tigers won promotion to Nationalliga A in 1998. In 2001, he was drafted by the NHL's Mighty Ducks of Anaheim and spent the subsequent season in Sweden playing for Färjestads BK in the Elitserien. He moved to the Ducks organization in 2002 and on 11 October of that year, Gerber played his first NHL game, a 4–2 loss to the Dallas Stars. He went on to play 22 regular season games that season, serving as backup to Jean-Sébastien Giguère. That season, the Mighty Ducks made it to the Stanley Cup Final, narrowly losing in seven games to the New Jersey Devils. Gerber continued his role as backup and played 32 games for Anaheim in 2003–04.

On 18 June 2004, Gerber was traded to the Carolina Hurricanes in exchange for Tomáš Malec and a third-round pick in the 2004 NHL entry draft. During the 2004–05 NHL lockout, Gerber returned to his former European teams, playing 20 games with the SCL Tigers and 30 with Färjestad BK.

Gerber returned to the NHL for the 2005–06 season, and it was a successful one for Gerber, who won 38 games and helped earn Carolina their third division championship. Gerber entered the 2006 Stanley Cup playoffs as the Hurricanes' starting goaltender, but he struggled in the team's opening series and was replaced by rookie Cam Ward, who had been his backup for most of the season. Ward went on to backstop the team to its first Stanley Cup championship as the Hurricanes defeated the Edmonton Oilers in seven games in the Final. Gerber, who earned 1 of Carolina's 16 playoff wins, became the second Swiss player in NHL history to win a Stanley Cup; David Aebischer, also a goaltender, was the first in 2001 with the Colorado Avalanche.

On 1 July 2006, as a free agent, Gerber signed a contract with the Ottawa Senators. However, he struggled throughout the season and was replaced as starting goaltender by Ray Emery. That season, Emery led the Senators to their first appearance in the Stanley Cup Final, where they would lose to Gerber's former team, the Anaheim Ducks. It was Gerber's third appearance in the Stanley Cup Finals in five years. Gerber began the 2007–08 season as the Senators' starter when Emery was sidelined after off-season wrist surgery. His play was inconsistent and Emery resumed the starting job once he was healthy again. However, after the team suffered a rapid decline in the standings and head coach John Paddock was fired and replaced by general manager Bryan Murray, Murray declared Gerber as the starting goaltender for the remainder of the season. Gerber entered the 2008–09 season in that role, but his uneven play continued and he was eventually supplanted by the newly signed Alex Auld. On 22 January 2009, Gerber was placed on waivers after having been sent down to the Senators' then-American Hockey League (AHL) affiliate, the Binghamton Senators.

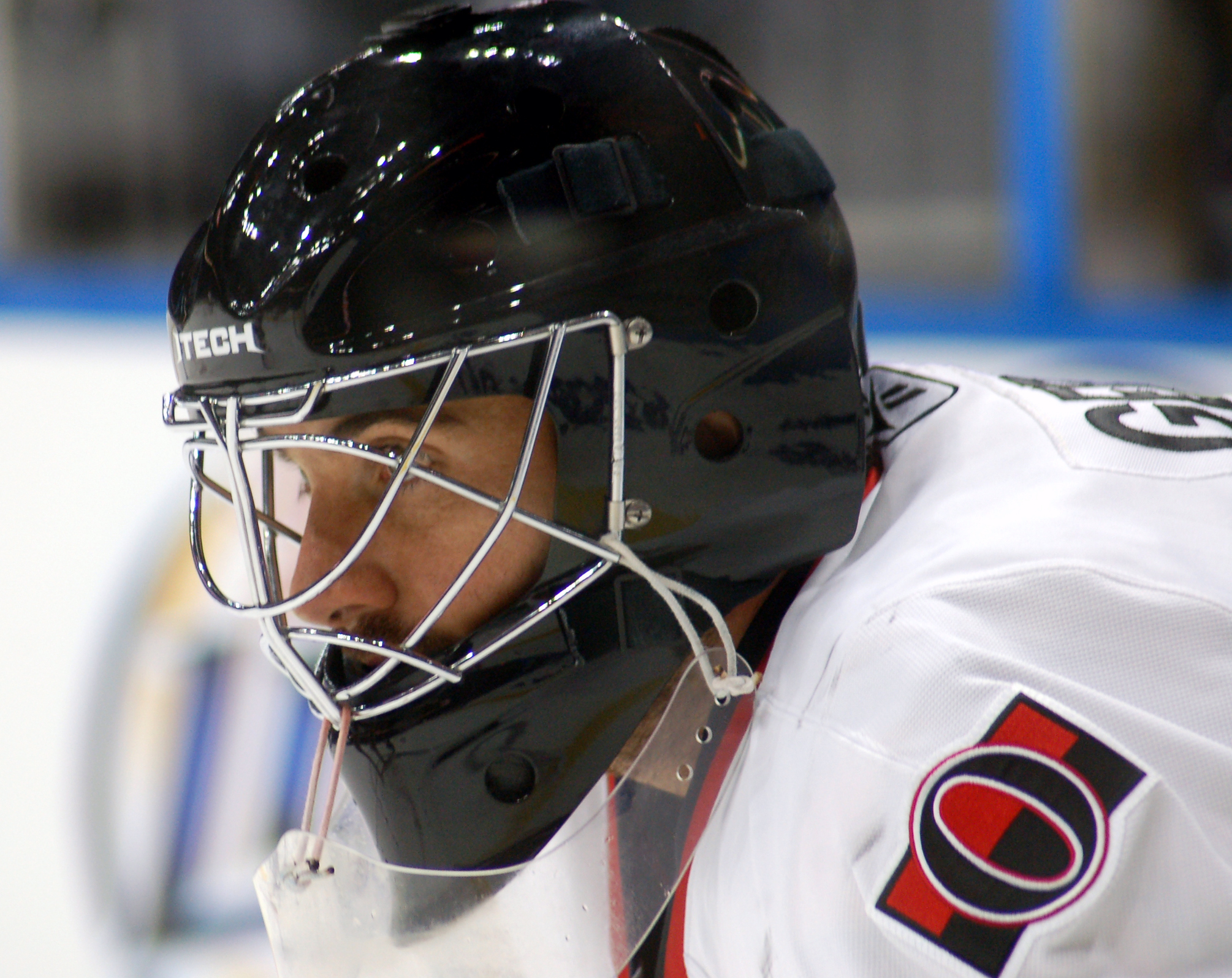
Gerber sporting his all-black "Darth Gerber" mask with the Senators.

On 4 March 2009, Gerber was claimed off waivers by the Toronto Maple Leafs to replace goaltender Vesa Toskala, who was scheduled for season-ending surgery. During a game on 24 March against the Washington Capitals, Gerber was assessed a game-misconduct and immediately suspended for three games for an incident with the on-ice officials, during which Gerber was arguing a call and proceeded to make contact with referee Mike Leggo and a linesman who was attempting to restrain him.

During the off-season, Gerber signed a contract with Atlant Moscow Oblast of the Kontinental Hockey League (KHL), coincidentally the same team that fellow former Senators goaltender Ray Emery played for the previous season before returning to the NHL in 2009. On 13 December 2009, while playing for Atlant, Gerber suffered an apparent fracture of the fourth vertebrae when an opposing forward slid into him. Gerber's neck injury was initially thought to be a compression fracture of a cervical vertebra and it was believed that he would miss upwards of six months. However, after more comprehensive testing the following day, no fractures were found and it was diagnosed as a spinal contusion; he would only be sidelined for a few weeks.

On 6 August 2010, Gerber signed a one-year contract with the Edmonton Oilers. He was assigned to the team's AHL affiliate, the Oklahoma City Barons. He was recalled on 18 November after Oilers' goaltender Nikolai Khabibulin was placed on injured reserve. Gerber made his first start for the Oilers on 25 November, recording a 3–2 victory over the visiting Colorado Avalanche. He stopped 35 of 37 shots and drew an assist on the game-winning goal scored by Taylor Hall. Gerber started one more game, a 4–1 victory at Ottawa, before Khabibulin was re-activated and Gerber was returned to the Barons. Gerber was again re-called in late February after another injury to Khabibulin. Picking up where he left off in late November, Gerber stopped 34 shots in a 2–1 shootout win over the Nashville Predators on 1 March, improving to a 3–0 record with Edmonton.

On 12 July 2011, Gerber signed a one-year contract with Växjö Lakers of the Swedish Elitserien. Playing 42 games, he finished the 2011–12 season ranked fifth in the save percentage with .928 and seventh in goals against average (GAA) with 2.18, although Växjö failed to qualify for the playoffs. For the 2012–13 season, he signed with fellow Elitserien club Rögle BK. After one season with Rögle, Gerber returned to Switzerland in signing a two-year contract with Kloten Flyers. He retired from professional hockey at age 42 after his contract with Kloten expired in 2017.

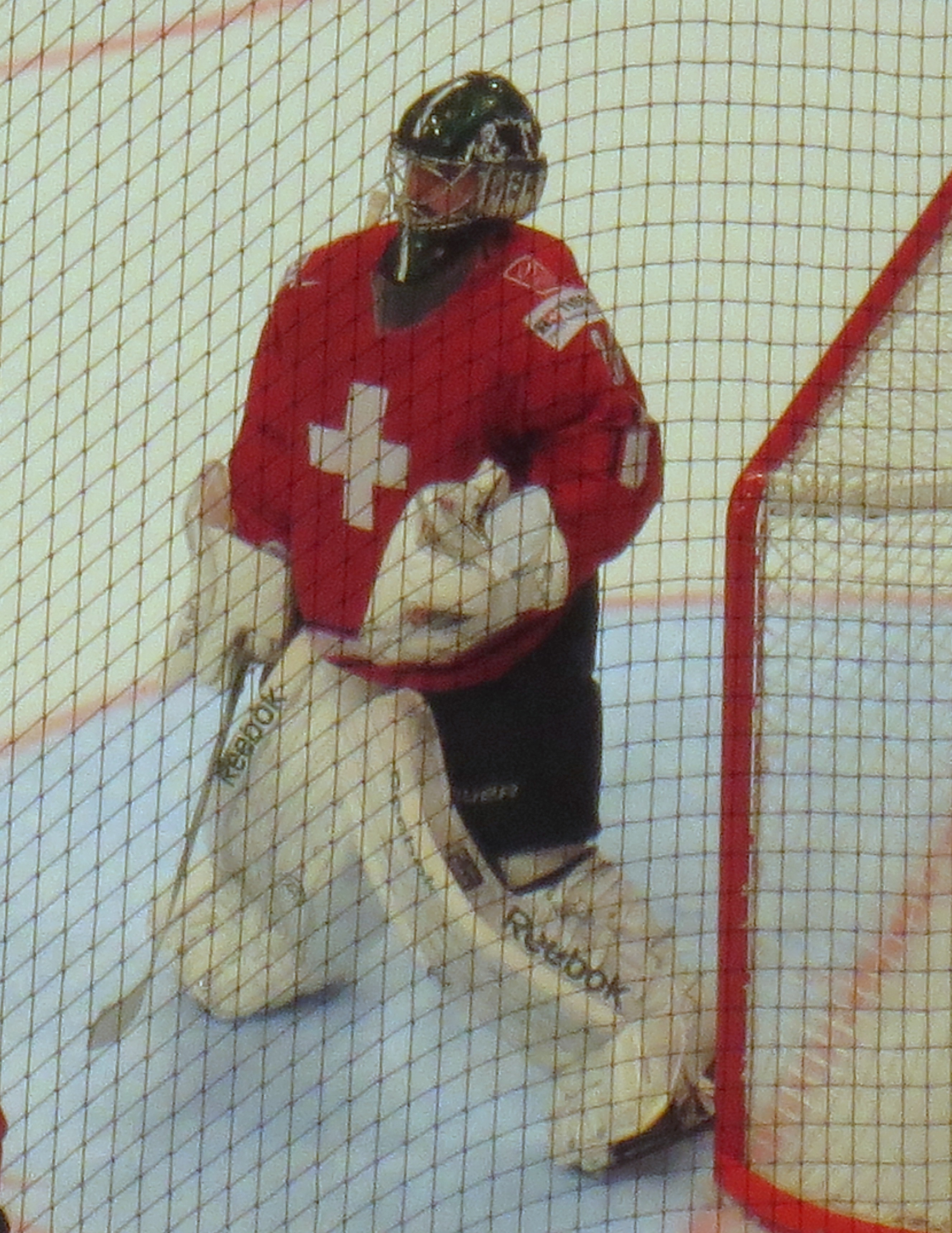

Medal record

Representing Switzerland

Ice hockey

Ice Hockey World Championships
Silver medal – second place	2013 Sweden/Finland	

=== Goaltender mask ===
To start the 2007–08 season, Gerber wore an all-black mask while his other mask was being painted; he played so well wearing the black mask that he decided not to replace it, wearing it for the remainder of the season. Fans endearingly called him "Darth Gerber". In response, Gerber tried out a new Darth Vader-inspired mask design to begin the 2008–09 season when he was with the Ottawa Senators. The mask was worn by Gerber during his first few games with Toronto before he switched to a new one paying homage to old masks of past Maple Leafs' goaltenders.

== International play ==
During his playing career, Gerber was a mainstay on the Switzerland national team, having represented his country in eight IIHF World Championships and two Winter Olympics since 2000. At the 2006 Winter Olympics, Gerber made 49 saves to shut-out a heavily-favoured Canada 2–0 in one of the biggest upsets in modern Olympic hockey history regarded as one of the greatest accomplishments in Swiss hockey. Gerber has appeared in 40 games at the World Championships. Switzerland failed to medal in any of these tournaments, their highest finish being fifth in 2010, though their play has seen their IIHF World Rank increase from ninth in 2003 to seventh in 2010.

== Career statistics ==
=== Regular season and playoffs ===
			Regular season										Playoffs
Season	Team	League	GP	W	L	T	OTL	MIN	GA	SO	GAA	SV%	GP	W	L	MIN	GA	SO	GAA	SV%
1992–93	SC Signau	SWI-5	—	—	—	—	—	—	—	—	—	—	—	—	—	—	—	—	—	—
1993–94	SC Thun	SWI-4	—	—	—	—	—	—	—	—	—	—	—	—	—	—	—	—	—	—
1994–95	SC Langnau	SWI-2	5	—	—	—	—	222	18	0	4.86	—	1	—	—	—	—	—	4.50	—
1995–96	SC Langnau	SWI-U20	—	—	—	—	—	—	—	—	—	—	—	—	—	—	—	—	—	—
1996–97	SC Langnau	SWI-2	38	—	—	—	—	2286	121	0	3.18	—	8	—	—	488	29	0	3.56	—
1997–98	SC Langnau	SWI-2	40	—	—	—	—	2430	141	—	3.48	—	16	—	—	961	42	0	2.62	—
1998–99	SC Langnau	NDA	42	—	—	—	—	2522	203	—	4.83	—	—	—	—	—	—	—	—	—
1999–00	SC Langnau	NDA	44	—	—	—	—	2652	161	—	3.64	—	—	—	—	—	—	—	—	—
2000–01	SC Langnau	NLA	44	—	—	—	—	2671	114	3	2.56	.927	—	—	—	—	—	—	—	—
2001–02	Färjestad BK	SEL	44	—	—	—	—	2664	87	4	1.96	.922	10	—	—	657	18	2	1.64	.941
2002–03	Cincinnati Mighty Ducks	AHL	1	1	0	0	—	60	2	0	2.00	.951	—	—	—	—	—	—	—	—
2002–03	Mighty Ducks of Anaheim	NHL	22	6	11	3	—	1203	39	1	1.94	.929	2	0	0	20	1	0	3.00	.833
2003–04	Mighty Ducks of Anaheim	NHL	32	11	12	4	—	1698	64	2	2.26	.918	—	—	—	—	—	—	—	—
2004–05	SC Langnau	NLA	20	6	10	4	—	1217	57	0	2.81	—	—	—	—	—	—	—	—	—
2004–05	Färjestad BK	SEL	30	20	6	4	—	1827	58	4	1.90	.929	15	9	6	900	36	1	2.40	.925
2005–06	Carolina Hurricanes	NHL	60	38	14	—	6	3492	162	3	2.78	.906	6	1	1	221	13	1	3.53	.856
2006–07	Ottawa Senators	NHL	29	15	9	—	3	1969	74	1	2.78	.906	—	—	—	—	—	—	—	—
2007–08	Ottawa Senators	NHL	57	30	18	—	4	3197	145	2	2.72	.910	4	0	4	238	14	0	3.53	.912
2008–09	Ottawa Senators	NHL	14	4	9	—	1	839	40	1	2.86	.899	—	—	—	—	—	—	—	—
2008–09	Binghamton Senators	AHL	14	6	7	—	0	783	38	1	3.03	.902	—	—	—	—	—	—	—	—
2008–09	Toronto Maple Leafs	NHL	12	6	5	—	0	706	38	0	3.23	.905	—	—	—	—	—	—	—	—
2009–10	Atlant Mytishchi	KHL	30	15	6	—	6	1751	64	2	2.19	.914	—	—	—	—	—	—	—	—
2010–11	Oklahoma City Barons	AHL	42	20	16	—	4	2472	107	4	2.60	.911	6	2	3	335	10	1	1.79	.931
2010–11	Edmonton Oilers	NHL	3	3	0	—	0	185	4	0	1.30	.958	—	—	—	—	—	—	—	—
2011–12	Växjö Lakers	SEL	42	—	—	—	—	2417	88	4	2.18	.928	—	—	—	—	—	—	—	—
2012–13	Rögle BK	SEL	43	11	31	—	0	2457	116	1	2.83	.916	—	—	—	—	—	—	—	—
2013–14	Kloten Flyers	NLA	34	17	14	—	0	2085	76	3	2.19	.927	15	6	8	885	33	1	2.24	.934
2014–15	Kloten Flyers	NLA	33	14	12	—	1	1888	79	2	2.51	.915	—	—	—	—	—	—	—	—
2015–16	Kloten Flyers	NLA	47	19	23	—	2	2790	137	0	2.95	.902	—	—	—	—	—	—	—	—
2016–17	EHC Kloten	NLA	30	11	11	—	5	1756	95	0	3.24	.910	—	—	—	—	—	—	—	—
NLA totals			294	—	—	—	—	17,581	922	—	3.15	—	15	6	8	885	33	1	2.24	.934
NHL totals			229	113	78	7	14	12,915	566	10	2.63	.911	12	1	5	479	28	1	3.50	.890

=== International ===
Year	Team	Event	Result	GP	W	L	T	MIN	GA	SO	GAA	SV%
2000	Switzerland	WC	6th	2	1	1	0	120	7	0	3.50	.873
2001	Switzerland	WC	9th	6	2	4	0	358	16	0	2.68	.919
2002	Switzerland	OG	11th	3	1	1	0	158	4	0	1.52	.958
2002	Switzerland	WC	10th	4	1	3	0	240	12	0	3.00	.894
2004	Switzerland	WC	8th	6	2	2	2	358	11	2	1.84	.932
2005	Switzerland	OGQ	Q	3	3	0	0	180	4	0	1.33	.923
2005	Switzerland	WC	8th	6	3	3	0	359	10	1	1.67	.946
2006	Switzerland	OG	6th	3	1	2	0	160	11	1	4.13	.890
2008	Switzerland	WC	7th	5	3	2	—	267	14	0	3.15	.879
2009	Switzerland	WC	9th	6	3	3	—	364	14	1	2.31	.902
2010	Switzerland	WC	5th	5	3	2	—	298	7	1	1.41	.936
2013	Switzerland	WC	2nd place, silver medalist(s)	6	4	2	—	365	11	0	1.81	.923
Senior totals				52	24	25	2	3047	117	6	2.30	.916
