= Greg Devorski =

Canadian ice hockey official

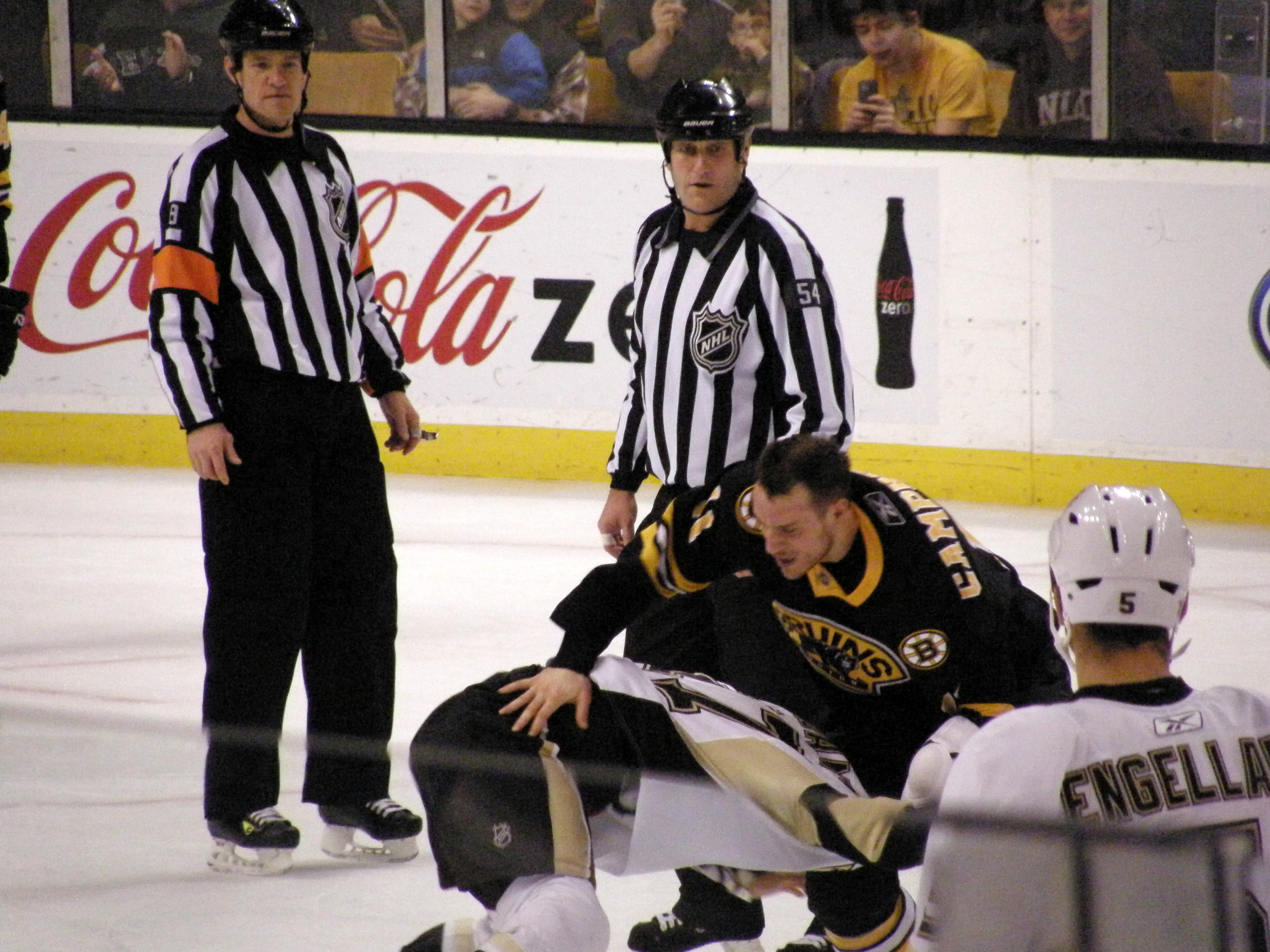
- Devorski (centre) and referee Dave Jackson observe a 2011 hockey fight
- Born: August 3, 1969; Guelph, Ontario, Canada
- Occupation: Ice hockey linesman
- Years active: 1993–2021
- Employer: National Hockey League

Greg Devorski (born August 3, 1969 in Guelph, Ontario) is a retired National Hockey League linesman. He made his debut during the 1993–94 NHL season, and wore uniform number 54. He is the younger brother of former NHL referee Paul Devorski. Devorski was rewarded with assignments to four Stanley Cup Finals. Devorski has worked 1,759 regular season games along with 227 playoff appearances.

Devorski was also selected as a linesman for the 2014 Winter Olympics.
