= Bill McCreary (referee) =

Canadian ice hockey referee (born 1955)

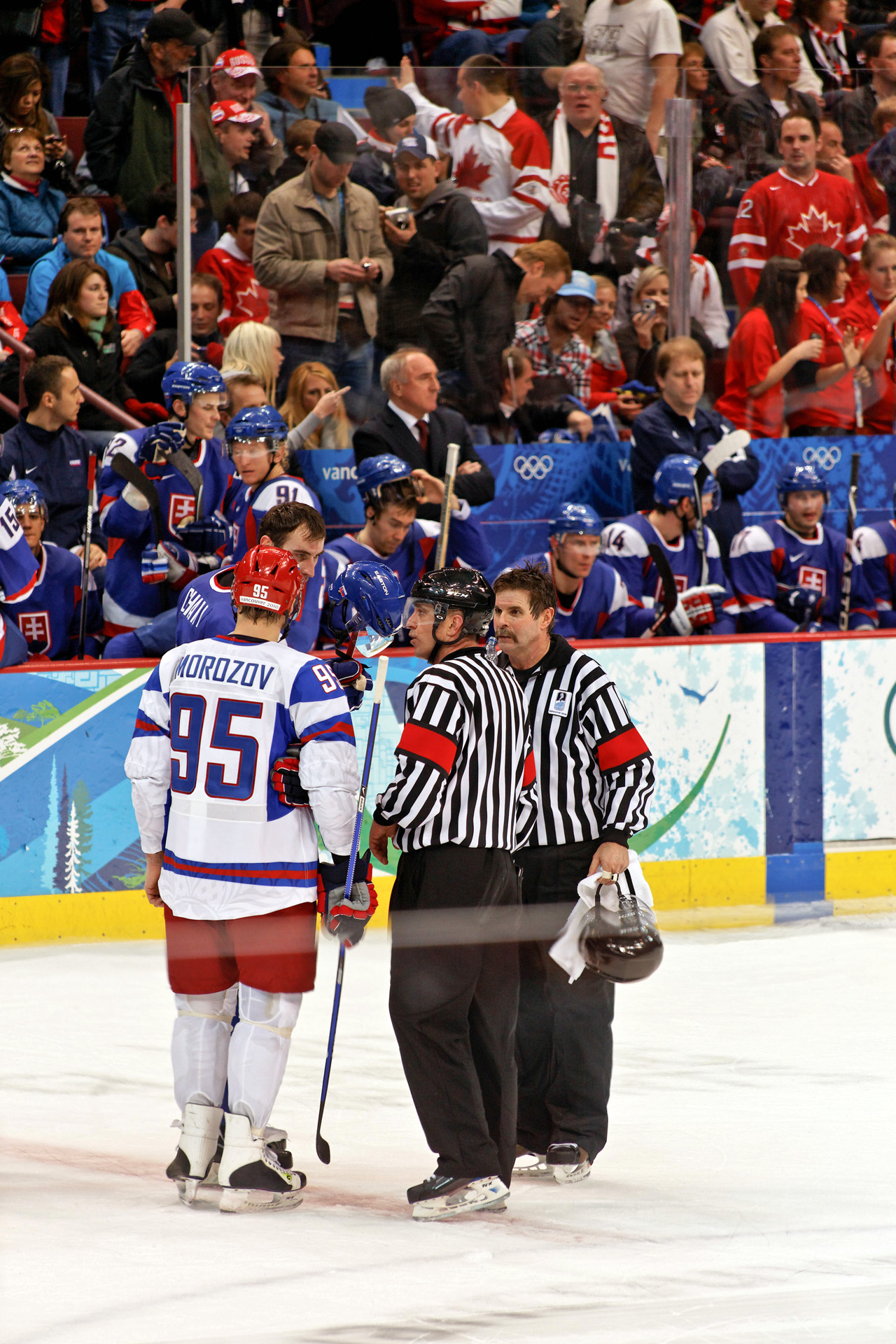
- McCreary (right) at the 2010 Winter Olympics
- Born: November 17, 1955 (age 70); Guelph, Ontario, Canada
- Occupation: Ice hockey referee
- Years active: 1984–2011
- Employer: National Hockey League
Ice hockey career
- Hockey Hall of Fame, 2014 (Official)

William McCreary (born November 17, 1955) is a former National Hockey League referee. Before retiring in 2011, McCreary officiated 1,737 regular season games, 297 playoff games, and one NHL All-Star Game. McCreary wore uniform number 7 since the 1994–95 NHL season and wore a helmet for most of his refereeing career. He worked fifteen Stanley Cup Finals, the 1991 Canada Cup, the 1996 World Cup of Hockey, and the 1998, 2002 and 2010 Winter Olympics, where he officiated the gold medal game each time.

== Early life ==
McCreary was born on November 17, 1955, in Guelph, Ontario. He learned to skate at the age of three years old after beating meningitis, which his sister had died from. McCreary competed with the Buffalo Tondas, Windsor Spitfires, and the Guelph Holody Platers in the SOJHL from 1973-76. After going undrafted out of junior hockey, he accepted a position at a machine shop and worked side jobs as a referee in local minor hockey games.

== Career ==
McCreary was invited to an National Hockey League (NHL) officials training camp in 1981 after officiating for three years. After refereeing one major junior playoff game, he was hired by Scotty Morrison for the NHL. He eventually refereed his first NHL game in 1984 at Capital Centre in Landover, Maryland, then home of the Washington Capitals. During the 2002 Winter Olympic Games in Salt Lake City, he officiated the men's hockey gold medal game won by Canada vs USA by the score of 5-2.

During the 2004–05 NHL lockout, McCreary worked building kitchen cabinets to make ends meet.

In 2007, McCreary was selected to officiate the Stanley Cup Finals for the 13th year in a row. On February 16, 2008, McCreary refereed his 1,500th NHL game in a match between the Toronto Maple Leafs and the Boston Bruins. In 2009, McCreary officiated the Stanley Cup Final for the 14th time. He was also selected as one of 13 NHL referees to officiate at the 2010 Winter Olympics in Vancouver, including the Gold Medal Game.

On December 22, 2009, McCreary officiated when Martin Brodeur broke Terry Sawchuk's career shutout record with his 104th shutout.

Although he had previously announced that he would retire as an NHL referee at the end of the 2009-10 NHL season, he returned for the 2010-11 NHL season. The next year, he was inducted into the Guelph Sports Hall of Fame. McCreary officiated his last NHL game on April 2, 2011, in Washington, D.C., between the Washington Capitals and Buffalo Sabres, a game won by the Capitals 5-4.

On June 23, 2014, the Hockey Hall of Fame Selection Committee announced that McCreary would be enshrined in the Hall of Fame with the 2014 class of inductees.

In November 2025, McCreary was announced as the Director of Officiating, Strategy & Performance for the PWHL for the 2025-2026 season.

== Personal life ==
McCreary has two sons from an earlier relationship and two daughters with his wife Mary Ann.

== See also ==
- List of members of the Hockey Hall of Fame
- List of NHL on-ice officials
