= Scott Driscoll (linesman) =

Canadian ice hockey official

- Born: May 2, 1968 (age 56); Seaforth, Ontario, Canada
- Position: Linesman
- Playing career: 1992–2020

Scott Driscoll (born May 2, 1968) is a Canadian retired National Hockey League linesman, who wore uniform number 68.

== Career ==
Driscoll's career began in the 1992–93 NHL season. He worked more than 1,840 regular season games, 185 playoff games, three Stanley Cup Finals (2004, 2007, and 2014), and the 1996 World Cup of Hockey. Driscoll retired in 2020.
