= Mike Leggo =

Ice hockey referee

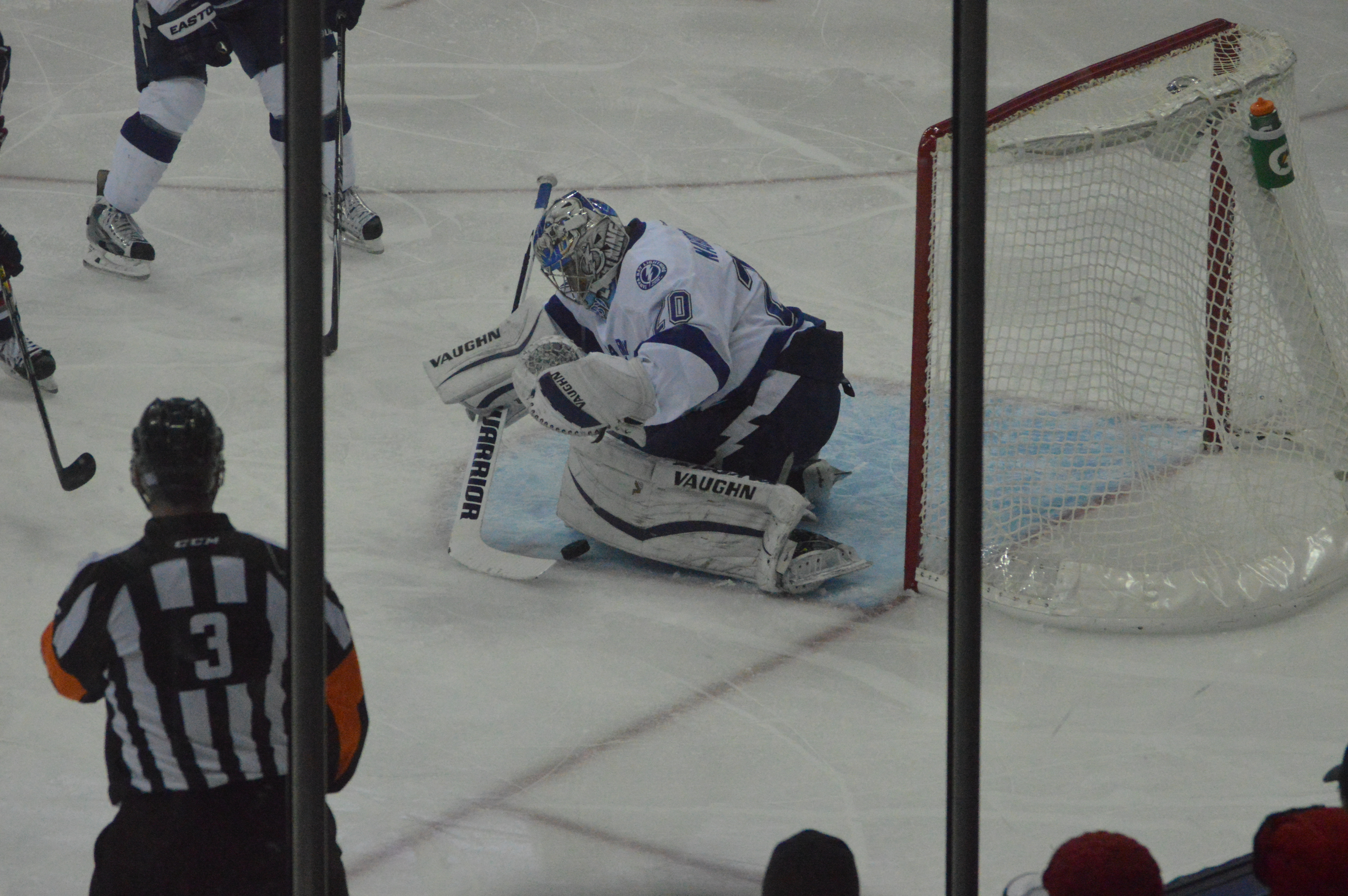
- Leggo watches as Evgeni Nabokov makes a save during a 2014 game
- Born: October 7, 1964 (age 61); North Bay, Ontario, Canada
- Occupation: Ice hockey referee
- Years active: 1997–2017
- Employer: National Hockey League

Mike Leggo (born October 7, 1964) is a retired National Hockey League referee. His career started in the 1996–97 NHL season, and he wore the uniform number 3. He was selected to work games in the ice hockey men's tournament at the 2014 Winter Olympics in Sochi, Russia.

== Early life ==
Mike Leggo attended school in Victoria, British Columbia, where he started refereeing junior hockey, including the Western Hockey League.

Leggo's early officiating career also included working in the Ontario Hockey League, and minor leagues such as the ECHL, International Hockey League, and the American Hockey League.

== Career ==
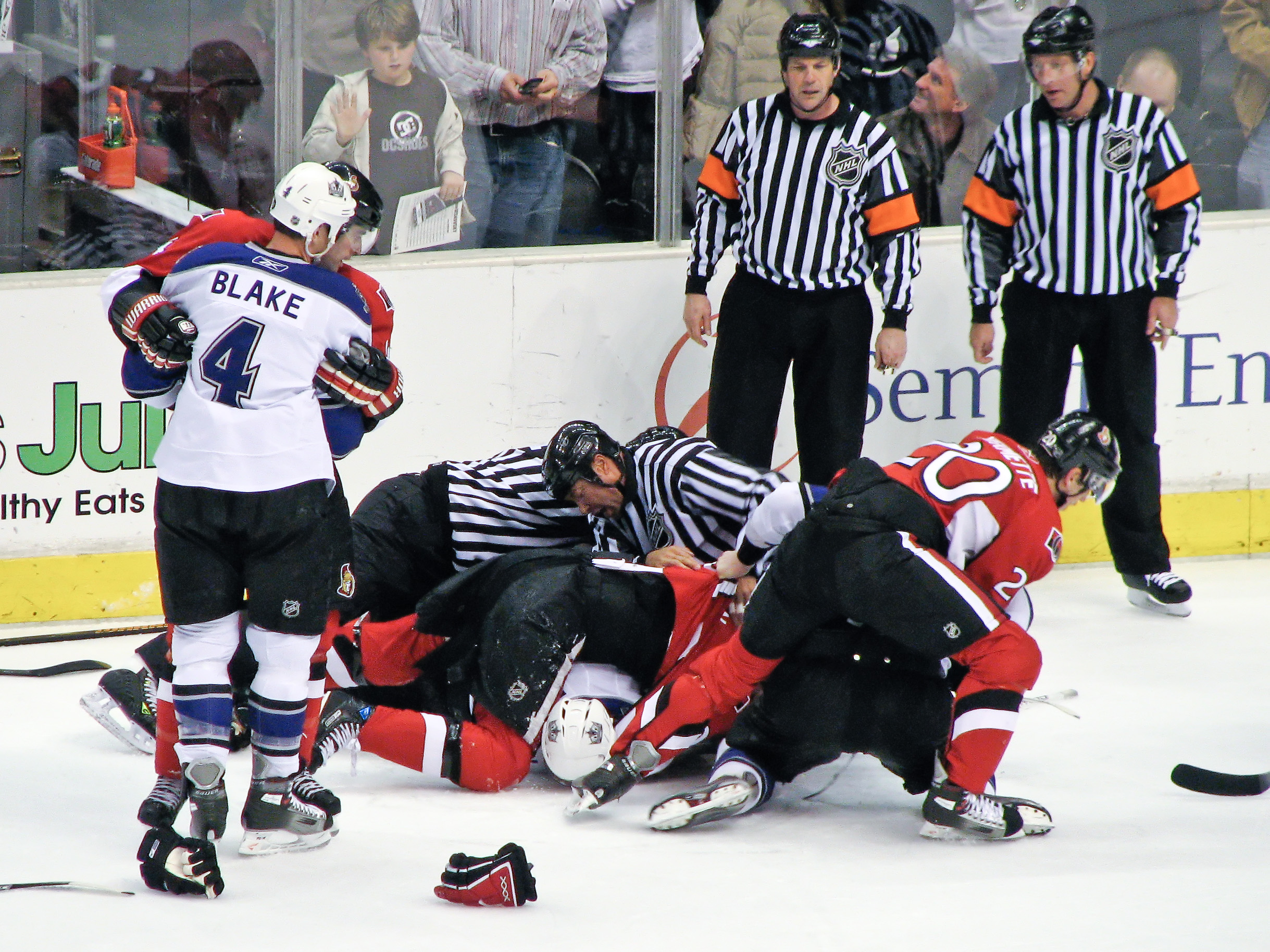
Leggo, with Brad Meier to his left, during a 2008 game

Leggo made his NHL debut on April 1, 1997, for a Washington Capitals home game against the Boston Bruins, however there is no record of the game being played. The Capitals did play the New Jersey Devils at the Capital Centre that day, with Terry Gregson as referee.

Leggo officiated the 2000–01 NHL season opening series played in Saitama, Japan. He worked his first playoff assignment that postseason, which was game two of the 2001 Western Conference quarterfinals between the Edmonton Oilers and the Dallas Stars.

He refereed another international season opening series in 2010, being assigned to two games between the Phoenix Coyotes and the Boston Bruins in Prague, Czech Republic.

In 2013, a penalty call by Leggo during an October 5 game went viral after he told the audience and Dallas Stars forward Shawn Horcoff “You can’t do that” before announcing the minor penalty against Horcoff for hooking Washington Capitals forward Jay Beagle.

On October 14, 2014, he officiated his 1,000th NHL game. It was played between the Edmonton Oilers and the Los Angeles Kings at the Staples Center. He became the 24th referee to achieve the milestone, and selected Brad Watson, Shane Heyer and Darren Gibbs to work the game with him.

As well as officiating in the 2014 Winter Olympics, Leggo was a referee for the 2016 Spengler Cup.

He worked his final NHL game when the Los Angeles Kings and the Arizona Coyotes played each other on April 2, 2017. His crew members for the game included referee Brad Watson, and linesmen Tim Nowak and Lonnie Cameron.

Throughout his career, Leggo refereed 1,213 regular season games and 42 Stanley Cup playoff games. He also participated in the 2007 NHL All-Star Game, the 2011 Heritage Classic, and the 2017 NHL All-Star Game.

Following his retirement, Leggo became the Scouting and Development Officiating Manager for the NHL. In July 2024, he was an instructor for the European Summer Exposure Combine in Budapest, Hungary.

== Personal life ==
Leggo is married and has two daughters.

On February 6, 2018, Leggo assisted in establishing the Guinness World Record for Highest altitude game of ice hockey when he refereed a charity game in the village of Chibra Kargyam in Ladakh, India.

== See also ==
- List of NHL on-ice officials
