= Brad Watson (ice hockey) =

Canadian ice hockey official (born 1961)

- Born: October 4, 1961 (age 64) Regina, Saskatchewan, Canada
- Position: Linesman
- Playing career: c. 1996–2019

Brad Watson (born October 4, 1961) is a Canadian retired National Hockey League referee who wore uniform number 23.

== Career ==
As of the end of the 2007–08 NHL season, he has officiated 542 regular season games and 62 playoff games. He officiated on December 8, 2009, when Martin Brodeur tied Terry Sawchuk's career shutout record with his 103rd shutout. He has officiated the Stanley Cup Final series in 2003, 2004, 2006, 2007, 2008, 2012, 2013, and 2014.

Watson officiated in his 1,000th NHL game at Pepsi Center in Denver on January 21, 2014. The game was between the Toronto Maple Leafs and the Colorado Avalanche.

On May 3, 2015, Montreal Canadiens player Brandon Prust accused Watson of insulting him after he took a roughing call in the first period. Prust later apologized for the accusations.

Watson retired after the 2018–2019 season.
