= 2005–06 Washington Capitals season =

NHL hockey team season

2005–06 Washington Capitals
- Division: 5th Southeast
- Conference: 14th Eastern
- 2005–06 record: 29–41–12
- Home record: 16–18–7
- Road record: 13–23–5
- Goals for: 237
- Goals against: 306

Team information
- General manager: George McPhee
- Coach: Glen Hanlon
- Captain: Jeff Halpern
- Alternate captains: Brian Sutherby (Mar.–Apr.); Brendan Witt (Oct.–Mar.); Dainius Zubrus
- Arena: MCI Center
- Average attendance: 13,905
- Minor league affiliates: Hershey Bears; South Carolina Stingrays

Team leaders
- Goals: Alexander Ovechkin (52)
- Assists: Alexander Ovechkin (54)
- Points: Alexander Ovechkin (106)
- Penalty minutes: Brendan Witt (141)
- Plus/minus: Chris Clark (+9)
- Wins: Olaf Kolzig (20)
- Goals against average: Brent Johnson (3.44)

The 2005–06 Washington Capitals season was the Washington Capitals' 32nd season in the National Hockey League (NHL). The Capitals missed the playoffs for the second season in a row for the first time since the 1980–81 season and the 1981–82 season.

Following the 2004–05 NHL lockout, Alexander Ovechkin played his first game with the Washington Capitals on October 5, 2005, scoring two goals in a 3–2 victory over the Columbus Blue Jackets. In a shootout against the Mighty Ducks of Anaheim, Ovechkin scored the game-winning goal in a 5–4 win. The Capitals finished the 2005–06 season in fifth and last place of the Southeast Division with a 29–41–12 campaign, having 12 more points than the 2003–04 season, good for 27th out of the 30 NHL teams. Yet the team played close in every game, playing in 42 one-goal games, although losing two-thirds of those games. A notable first was that Washington area native Jeff Halpern was named captain of the hometown Capitals. At the 2006 trade deadline, March 9, Witt was traded to the Nashville Predators. Several Capitals achieved career highs in several offensive categories, including Matt Pettinger and Dainius Zubrus, who both achieved career highs in all offensive categories. Jeff Halpern set a new career high in assists for the second consecutive season.

== Regular season ==
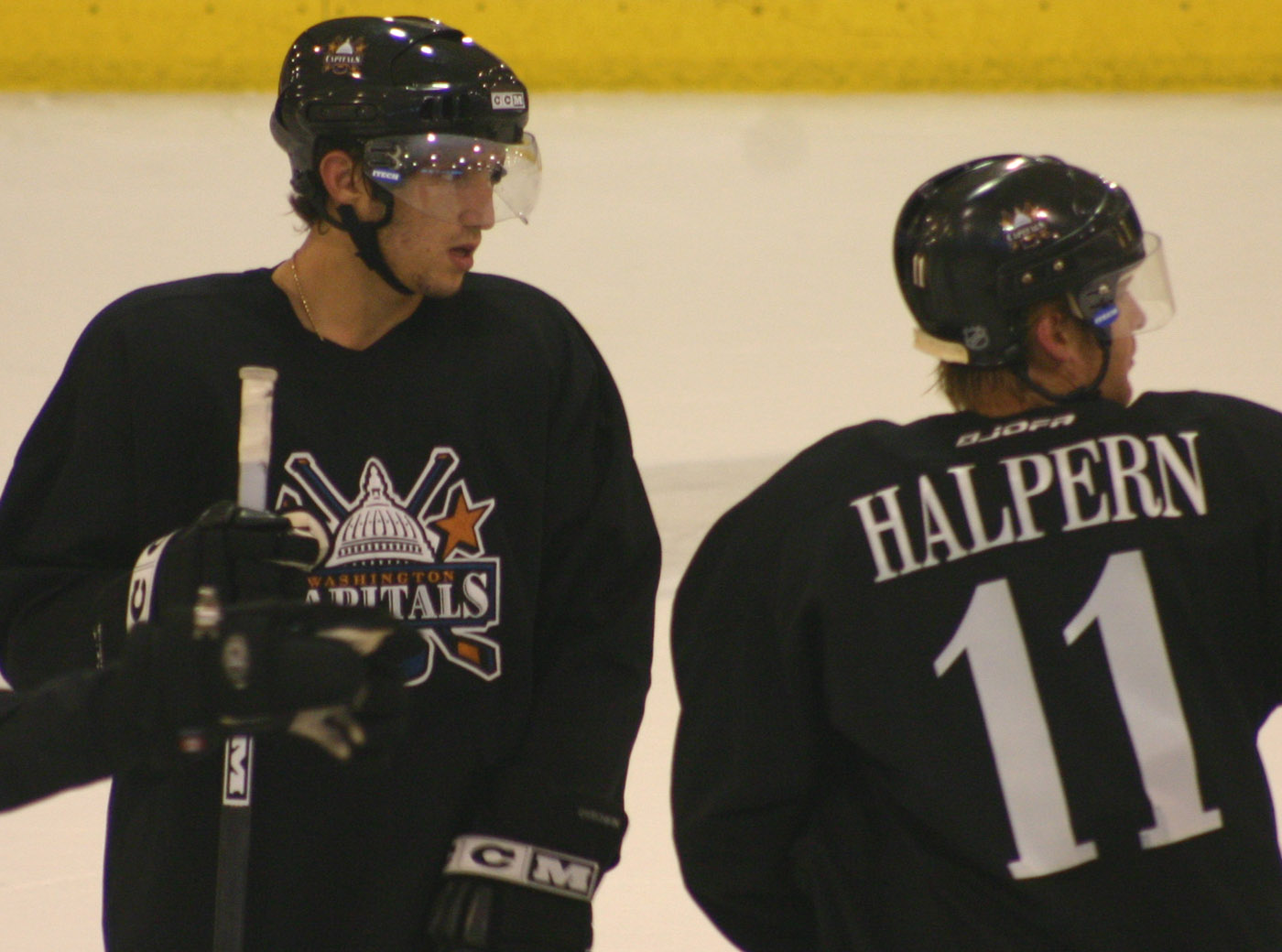
Rookie Alexander Ovechkin with team captain Jeff Halpern during training camp in September.

Many longtime Capitals had career years, with Dainius Zubrus netting 57 points, Halpern having a career-best 33 assists, Matt Pettinger putting in a career-best 20-goal, 38-point effort and seven others on the relatively young team topping 20 points for the first time. Two notable landmarks were also hit by Capitals, as the team's longest tenured Capital, Olaf Kolzig, won his 250th game in goal and Andrew Cassels became the 204th player to play 1,000 games, although he did not finish out his season with the team.

- November 22, 2005 – Sidney Crosby and Alexander Ovechkin face each other for the first time
- On January 13, 2006 in Anaheim, Ovechkin scored his first career hat trick against the Mighty Ducks of Anaheim to help Washington win the game. His hat trick goals went past Jean-Sebastien Giguere for his first ever hat trick game.
- January 29, 2006 – Dainius Zubrus scored the Game Winning Goal in a 2–1 victory for the Capitals.
- April 1, 2006 – Brent Johnson earned a shutout in a 1–0 victory over the Ottawa Senators.
- April 7, 2006 – In a game against the Carolina Hurricanes, Olaf Kolzig played his 600th game as a Washington Capitals.
- April 13, 2006 – Alexander Ovechkin becomes the second rookie in history to record 50 goals and 100 points in a season. Teemu Selanne was the first rookie to reach the accomplishment.

The Capitals were the most penalized team during the regular season, with 550 power-play opportunities against. They also allowed the most power-play goals, with 116, and the most short-handed goals, with 18.

=== Alexander Ovechkin ===
Ovechkin's rookie season exceeded the hype, as he led all 2005-06 NHL rookies in goals, points, power-play goals and shots. He finished third overall in the NHL in scoring and tied for third in goals; and his 425 shots not only led the league, but also set an NHL rookie record and was the fourth-highest total in NHL history. Ovechkin's rookie point total was the second-best in Washington Capitals history, and his goal total was tied for third in franchise history. He had 21 power play goals and a plus-minus rating of plus 2. Ovechkin won the Calder Memorial Trophy, beating out Pittsburgh center Sidney Crosby and Calgary Flames defenseman Dion Phaneuf.

=== Final standings ===
Southeast Division
No.	CR		GP	W	L	OTL	GF	GA	Pts
1	2	**Carolina Hurricanes**	82	52	22	8	294	260	112
2	8	**Tampa Bay Lightning**	82	43	33	6	252	260	92
3	10	Atlanta Thrashers	82	41	33	8	281	275	90
4	11	Florida Panthers	82	37	34	11	240	257	85
5	14	Washington Capitals	82	29	41	12	237	306	70

Note: CR = Conference rank; GP = Games played; W = Wins; L = Losses; T = Ties; OTL = Overtime loss; GF = Goals for; GA = Goals against; Pts = Points
Bolded teams qualified for the playoffs.

Eastern Conference
R		Div	GP	W	L	OTL	GF	GA	Pts
**1**	**Z-** Ottawa Senators	**NE**	**82**	**52**	**21**	**9**	**314**	**211**	113
**2**	**Y-** Carolina Hurricanes	**SE**	**82**	**52**	**22**	**8**	**294**	**260**	112
**3**	**Y-** New Jersey Devils	**AT**	**82**	**46**	**27**	**9**	**242**	**229**	101
**4**	**X-** Buffalo Sabres	**NE**	**82**	**52**	**24**	**6**	**242**	**239**	110
**5**	**X-** Philadelphia Flyers	**AT**	**82**	**45**	**26**	**11**	**267**	**259**	101
**6**	**X-** New York Rangers	**AT**	**82**	**44**	**26**	**12**	**257**	**215**	100
**7**	**X-** Montreal Canadiens	**NE**	**82**	**42**	**31**	**9**	**243**	**247**	93
**8**	**X-** Tampa Bay Lightning	**SE**	**82**	**43**	**33**	**6**	**252**	**260**	92
8.5
9	Toronto Maple Leafs	NE	82	41	33	8	257	270	90
10	Atlanta Thrashers	SE	82	41	33	8	281	275	90
11	Florida Panthers	SE	82	37	34	11	240	257	85
12	New York Islanders	AT	82	36	40	6	230	278	78
13	Boston Bruins	NE	82	29	37	16	230	266	74
14	Washington Capitals	SE	82	29	41	12	237	306	70
15	Pittsburgh Penguins	AT	82	22	46	14	244	316	58

Divisions: AT – Atlantic, NE – Northeast, SE – Southeast

Z – Clinched conference; Y – Clinched division; X – Clinched playoff spot

== Schedule and results ==
2005–06 regular season
October: 4–7–0 (home: 3–3–0; road: 1–4–0)

Game	Date	Score	Opponent	Record	Recap
1	October 5, 2005	3–2	Columbus Blue Jackets (2005–06)	1–0–0	W
2	October 7, 2005	3–7	Atlanta Thrashers (2005–06)	1–1–0	L
3	October 8, 2005	1–8	@ Atlanta Thrashers (2005–06)	1–2–0	L
4	October 10, 2005	2–3	New York Rangers (2005–06)	2–2–0	W
5	October 12, 2005	2–7	@ Carolina Hurricanes (2005–06)	2–3–0	L
6	October 13, 2005	3–5	New York Islanders (2005–06)	2–4–0	L
7	October 16, 2005	3–2 SO	Tampa Bay Lightning (2005–06)	3–4–0	W
8	October 20, 2005	2–3	@ Florida Panthers (2005–06)	3–5–0	L
9	October 22, 2005	0–4	Carolina Hurricanes (2005–06)	3–6–0	L
10	October 26, 2005	3–2	@ Buffalo Sabres (2005–06)	4–6–0	W
11	October 28, 2005	2–4	@ Tampa Bay Lightning (2005–06)	4–7–0	L

November: 4–7–2 (home: 3–2–1; road: 1–5–1)

Game	Date	Score	Opponent	Record	Recap
12	November 3, 2005	1–8	@ Philadelphia Flyers (2005–06)	4–8–0	L
13	November 4, 2005	3–2 SO	Atlanta Thrashers (2005–06)	5–8–0	W
14	November 6, 2005	5–4	Toronto Maple Leafs (2005–06)	6–8–0	W
15	November 8, 2005	4–6	@ Toronto Maple Leafs (2005–06)	6–9–0	L
16	November 11, 2005	3–4	New Jersey Devils (2005–06)	6–10–0	L
17	November 12, 2005	2–3	@ New Jersey Devils (2005–06)	6–11–0	L
18	November 15, 2005	4–3 SO	Tampa Bay Lightning (2005–06)	7–11–0	W
19	November 17, 2005	5–8	@ Buffalo Sabres (2005–06)	7–12–0	L
20	November 19, 2005	5–1	@ Montreal Canadiens (2005–06)	8–12–0	W
21	November 22, 2005	4–5	@ Pittsburgh Penguins (2005–06)	8–13–0	L
22	November 23, 2005	3–4 SO	Tampa Bay Lightning (2005–06)	8–13–1	OTL
23	November 26, 2005	2–3 SO	@ New York Rangers (2005–06)	8–13–2	OTL
24	November 27, 2005	2–3	Buffalo Sabres (2005–06)	8–14–2	L

December: 5–6–1 (home: 3–3–1; road: 2–3–0)

Game	Date	Score	Opponent	Record	Recap
25	December 1, 2005	2–3	@ Florida Panthers (2005–06)	8–15–2	L
26	December 3, 2005	5–1	New York Rangers (2005–06)	9–15–2	W
27	December 7, 2005	2–5	Nashville Predators (2005–06)	9–16–2	L
28	December 9, 2005	3–4	Detroit Red Wings (2005–06)	9–17–2	L
29	December 14, 2005	3–2	@ Los Angeles Kings (2005–06)	10–17–2	W
30	December 16, 2005	1–4	@ San Jose Sharks (2005–06)	10–18–2	L
31	December 18, 2005	2–3	Florida Panthers (2005–06)	10–19–2	L
32	December 22, 2005	6–5 SO	@ Atlanta Thrashers (2005–06)	11–19–2	W
33	December 23, 2005	4–2	Montreal Canadiens (2005–06)	12–19–2	W
34	December 27, 2005	3–4 OT	Boston Bruins (2005–06)	12–19–3	OTL
35	December 28, 2005	2–7	@ New Jersey Devils (2005–06)	12–20–3	L
36	December 31, 2005	4–3 SO	Philadelphia Flyers (2005–06)	13–20–3	W

January: 5–8–2 (home: 3–4–2; road: 2–4–0)

Game	Date	Score	Opponent	Record	Recap
37	January 1, 2006	2–5	Atlanta Thrashers (2005–06)	13–21–3	L
38	January 4, 2006	1–3	Ottawa Senators (2005–06)	13–22–3	L
39	January 6, 2006	1–3	Philadelphia Flyers (2005–06)	13–23–3	L
40	January 8, 2006	3–4 SO	Florida Panthers (2005–06)	13–23–4	OTL
41	January 10, 2006	3–4 OT	Chicago Blackhawks (2005–06)	13–23–5	OTL
42	January 12, 2006	1–4	@ Dallas Stars (2005–06)	13–24–5	L
43	January 13, 2006	3–2 OT	@ Mighty Ducks of Anaheim (2005–06)	14–24–5	W
44	January 16, 2006	6–1	@ Phoenix Coyotes (2005–06)	15–24–5	W
45	January 19, 2006	5–4 SO	St. Louis Blues (2005–06)	16–24–5	W
46	January 21, 2006	5–2	Carolina Hurricanes (2005–06)	17–24–5	W
47	January 23, 2006	2–3	Boston Bruins (2005–06)	17–25–5	L
48	January 25, 2006	1–8	@ Pittsburgh Penguins (2005–06)	17–26–5	L
49	January 26, 2006	2–3	@ Boston Bruins (2005–06)	17–27–5	L
50	January 29, 2006	2–1	Tampa Bay Lightning (2005–06)	18–27–5	W
51	January 31, 2006	3–5	@ New York Islanders (2005–06)	18–28–5	L

February: 2–4–0 (home: 1–2–0; road: 1–2–0)

Game	Date	Score	Opponent	Record	Recap
52	February 3, 2006	4–1	Toronto Maple Leafs (2005–06)	19–28–5	W
53	February 4, 2006	0–5	@ Tampa Bay Lightning (2005–06)	19–29–5	L
54	February 7, 2006	0–5	Florida Panthers (2005–06)	19–30–5	L
55	February 10, 2006	4–5	@ Philadelphia Flyers (2005–06)	19–31–5	L
56	February 11, 2006	3–6	Pittsburgh Penguins (2005–06)	19–32–5	L
57	February 28, 2006	5–3	@ Toronto Maple Leafs (2005–06)	20–32–5	W

March: 4–6–5 (home: 2–3–2; road: 2–3–3)

Game	Date	Score	Opponent	Record	Recap
58	March 2, 2006	1–7	@ Ottawa Senators (2005–06)	20–33–5	L
59	March 4, 2006	2–3 OT	@ Atlanta Thrashers (2005–06)	20–33–6	OTL
60	March 6, 2006	5–2	New York Islanders (2005–06)	21–33–6	W
61	March 8, 2006	6–3	Pittsburgh Penguins (2005–06)	22–33–6	W
62	March 10, 2006	3–4 SO	New Jersey Devils (2005–06)	22–33–7	OTL
63	March 12, 2006	2–5	Ottawa Senators (2005–06)	22–34–7	L
64	March 14, 2006	4–6	Buffalo Sabres (2005–06)	22–35–7	L
65	March 16, 2006	4–5	@ New York Rangers (2005–06)	22–36–7	L
66	March 18, 2006	3–4 SO	Florida Panthers (2005–06)	22–36–8	OTL
67	March 20, 2006	2–4	Montreal Canadiens (2005–06)	22–37–8	L
68	March 22, 2006	2–3	@ Florida Panthers (2005–06)	22–38–8	L
69	March 23, 2006	3–4 OT	@ Tampa Bay Lightning (2005–06)	22–38–9	OTL
70	March 25, 2006	3–1	@ Carolina Hurricanes (2005–06)	23–38–9	W
71	March 29, 2006	5–1	@ Carolina Hurricanes (2005–06)	24–38–9	W
72	March 30, 2006	2–3 OT	@ Montreal Canadiens (2005–06)	24–38–10	OTL

April: 5–3–2 (home: 1–1–1; road: 4–2–1)

Game	Date	Score	Opponent	Record	Recap
73	April 1, 2006	1–0	@ Ottawa Senators (2005–06)	25–38–10	W
74	April 3, 2006	5–6 OT	@ Carolina Hurricanes (2005–06)	25–38–11	OTL
75	April 5, 2006	3–4 SO	Carolina Hurricanes (2005–06)	25–38–12	OTL
76	April 7, 2006	3–4	Carolina Hurricanes (2005–06)	25–39–12	L
77	April 8, 2006	0–5	@ New York Islanders (2005–06)	25–40–12	L
78	April 10, 2006	2–1 OT	@ Boston Bruins (2005–06)	26–40–12	W
79	April 13, 2006	3–5	@ Atlanta Thrashers (2005–06)	26–41–12	L
80	April 15, 2006	2–1 SO	@ Florida Panthers (2005–06)	27–41–12	W
81	April 17, 2006	6–4	Atlanta Thrashers (2005–06)	28–41–12	W
82	April 18, 2006	4–1	@ Tampa Bay Lightning (2005–06)	29–41–12	W

Legend: W Win (2 points) L Loss (0 points) OTL Overtime/shootout loss (1 point)

== Player statistics ==
=== Scoring ===
- Position abbreviations: C = Center; D = Defense; G = Goaltender; LW = Left wing; RW = Right wing
- † = Joined team via a transaction (e.g., trade, waivers, signing) during the season. Stats reflect time with the Capitals only.
- ‡ = Left team via a transaction (e.g., trade, waivers, release) during the season. Stats reflect time with the Capitals only.

No.	Player	Pos	Regular season					
No.	Player	Pos	GP	G	A	Pts	+/-	PIM
8	Alexander Ovechkin	LW	81	52	54	106	2	52
9	Dainius Zubrus	C	71	23	34	57	3	84
11	Jeff Halpern	C	70	11	33	44	−8	79
24	Brian Willsie	RW	82	19	22	41	−19	77
17	Chris Clark	RW	78	20	19	39	9	110
18	Matt Pettinger	LW	71	20	18	38	−2	39
27	Ben Clymer	RW	77	16	17	33	−7	72
16	Brian Sutherby	C	76	14	16	30	−17	73
6	Jamie Heward	D	71	7	21	28	−5	54
47	Bryan Muir	D	72	8	18	26	−9	72
21	Brooks Laich	C	73	7	14	21	−9	26
10	Matt Bradley	RW	74	7	12	19	−8	72
44	Steve Eminger	D	66	5	13	18	−12	81
26	Shaone Morrisonn	D	80	1	13	14	7	91
34	Mathieu Biron	D	52	4	9	13	−11	50
25	Andrew Cassels‡	C	31	4	8	12	−3	14
19	Brendan Witt‡	D	58	1	10	11	−5	141
23	Ivan Majesky	D	57	1	8	9	−2	66
41 (Note: Friesen wore number 12 in his first 14 games.)	Jeff Friesen‡	LW	33	3	4	7	−11	24
40	Nolan Yonkman	D	38	0	7	7	1	86
20	Rico Fata†	RW	21	3	3	6	3	8
20	Petr Sykora‡	C	10	2	2	4	0	6
38	Jakub Klepis	C	25	1	3	4	−11	8
52	Mike Green	D	22	1	2	3	−8	18
37	Olaf Kolzig	G	59	0	3	3		14
43	Tomas Fleischmann	LW	14	0	2	2	−7	0
15	Boyd Gordon	C	25	0	1	1	−4	4
22	Boyd Kane	LW	5	0	1	1	1	2
28	Kris Beech†	C	5	0	0	0	0	4
30	Frederic Cassivi	G	1	0	0	0		0
51	Doug Doull†	LW	2	0	0	0	−1	19
50	Eric Fehr	RW	11	0	0	0	0	2
36	Colin Forbes†	C	9	0	0	0	−2	2
45	Jonas Johansson	RW	1	0	0	0	0	2
1	Brent Johnson	G	26	0	0	0		14
39	Graham Mink	C	3	0	0	0	0	0
51	Stephen Peat‡	RW	1	0	0	0	−2	2
41 (Note: Robitaille wore number 51 in his first game.)	Louis Robitaille	LW	2	0	0	0	−1	5
70	Dave Steckel	C	7	0	0	0	1	0
13	Joey Tenute†	C	1	0	0	0	0	0

=== Goaltending ===
No.	Player	Regular season									
No.	Player	GP	W	L	OT	SA	GA	GAA	SV%	SO	TOI
37	Olaf Kolzig	59	20	28	11	1987	206	3.53	.896	0	3506
1	Brent Johnson	26	9	12	1	854	81	3.44	.905	1	1413
30	Frederic Cassivi	1	0	1	0	30	4	4.07	.867	0	59

== Awards and records ==
=== Awards ===
Type	Award/honor	Recipient	Ref
League (annual)	Calder Memorial Trophy	Alexander Ovechkin	
League (annual)	King Clancy Memorial Trophy	Olaf Kolzig	
League (annual)	NHL All-Rookie Team	Alexander Ovechkin (Forward)	
League (annual)	NHL First All-Star Team	Alexander Ovechkin (Left wing)	
League (in-season)	NHL Offensive Player of the Month	Alexander Ovechkin (January)	
League (in-season)	NHL Offensive Player of the Week	Alexander Ovechkin (January 2)	
League (in-season)	NHL Offensive Player of the Week	Alexander Ovechkin (January 23)	
League (in-season)	NHL Rookie of the Month	Alexander Ovechkin (December)	
League (in-season)	NHL Rookie of the Month	Alexander Ovechkin (January)	

=== Milestones ===
Milestone	Player	Date	Ref
First game	Alexander Ovechkin	October 5, 2005	
First game	Mike Green	October 12, 2005	
First game	Tomas Fleischmann	November 3, 2005	
First game	Jakub Klepis	November 4, 2005	
First game	Eric Fehr	December 18, 2005	
First game	Dave Steckel	December 31, 2005	
First game	Louis Robitaille	February 7, 2006	
First game	Joey Tenute	February 7, 2006	
First game	Jonas Johansson	April 18, 2006	
1,000th game played	Andrew Cassels	November 22, 2005	

== Transactions ==
The Capitals were involved in the following transactions from February 17, 2005, the day after the 2004–05 NHL season was officially cancelled, through June 19, 2006, the day of the deciding game of the 2006 Stanley Cup Finals.

=== Trades ===
Date	Details		Ref
July 30, 2005	To Colorado Avalanche: 2nd-round pick in 2005; Ottawa's 2nd-round pick in 2005	To Washington Capitals: 1st-round pick in 2005	
July 30, 2005	To Buffalo Sabres: Rights to Tim Kennedy	To Washington Capitals: 6th-round pick in 2006	
August 4, 2005	To Calgary Flames: Conditional draft pick in 2006	To Washington Capitals: Chris Clark	
August 12, 2005	To Los Angeles Kings: Future considerations	To Washington Capitals: Bryan Muir	
September 26, 2005	To New Jersey Devils: Conditional draft pick in 2006 (Note: Eventually determined to be a 3rd-round pick.)	To Washington Capitals: Jeff Friesen	
December 2, 2005	To Vancouver Canucks: Maxime Ouellet	To Washington Capitals: 5th-round pick in 2006	
December 28, 2005	To Carolina Hurricanes: Stephen Peat	To Washington Capitals: Colin Forbes	
February 3, 2006	To Phoenix Coyotes: Dwayne Zinger	To Washington Capitals: Doug Doull	
March 9, 2006	To Anaheim Mighty Ducks: Jeff Friesen	To Washington Capitals: 2nd-round pick in 2006	
March 9, 2006	To Nashville Predators: Brendan Witt	To Washington Capitals: Kris Beech; 1st-round pick in 2006	

=== Players acquired ===
Date	Player	Former team	Term	Via	Ref
August 8, 2005	Ben Clymer	EHC Biel (NLB)		Free agency	
August 8, 2005	Miroslav Zalesak	San Jose Sharks		Free agency	
August 9, 2005	Andrew Cassels	Columbus Blue Jackets		Free agency	
August 9, 2005	Lawrence Nycholat	New York Rangers		Free agency	
August 10, 2005	Mathieu Biron	Florida Panthers		Free agency	
August 10, 2005	Ivan Majesky	Atlanta Thrashers		Free agency	
August 11, 2005	Frederic Cassivi	Cincinnati Mighty Ducks (AHL)		Free agency	
August 12, 2005	Jamie Heward	SCL Tigers (NLA)		Free agency	
August 12, 2005	Boyd Kane	Philadelphia Flyers		Free agency	
August 17, 2005	Mark Wotton	SKA Saint Petersburg (RSL)		Free agency	
August 18, 2005	Matt Bradley	Pittsburgh Penguins		Free agency	
August 18, 2005	Jean-Francois Fortin	Portland Pirates (AHL)		Free agency	
August 25, 2005	Dave Steckel	Manchester Monarchs (AHL)	2-year	Free agency	
October 4, 2005	Brent Johnson	Vancouver Canucks		Waivers	
November 20, 2005	Joey Tenute	Hershey Bears (AHL)	multi-year	Free agency	
March 9, 2006	Rico Fata	Atlanta Thrashers		Waivers	
April 1, 2006	Jamie Hunt	Mercyhurst College (AHA)	2-year	Free agency	
April 1, 2006	Matt Stefanishion	Ferris State University (CCHA)	2-year	Free agency	

=== Players lost ===
Date	Player	New team	Via (Note: In parentheses is the player's free agency group on August 1 if applicable.)	Ref
August 2, 2005	Trent Whitfield	St. Louis Blues	Free agency (UFA)	
August 23, 2005	Garret Stroshein	Boston Bruins	Free agency (UFA)	
September 7, 2005	Josef Boumedienne	ZSC Lions (NLA)	Free agency (II) (Note: Washington retained Boumedienne’s NHL rights and re-signed him on June 14, 2007.)	
September 7, 2005	Jeff Paul	Montreal Canadiens	Free agency (VI)	
October 7, 2005	Justin Eddy	Utah Grizzlies (AHL)	Free agency (UFA)	
October 7, 2005	Miroslav Zalesak	Sodertalje SK (SHL)	Release (Note: Zalesak exercised a clause to nullify his contract with Washington if he did not make the NHL team.)	
October 26, 2005	Jason Doig	Vancouver Canucks	Free agency (UFA)	
November 16, 2005	Darcy Verot	Syracuse Crunch (AHL)	Free agency (VI)	
January 28, 2006	Andrew Cassels (Note: Cassels retired.)		Release	

=== Signings ===
Date	Player	Term	Contract type	Ref
July 28, 2005	Eric Fehr	3-year	Entry-level	
August 5, 2005	Alexander Ovechkin	3-year	Entry-level	
August 11, 2005	Jared Aulin	1-year	Re-signing	
August 11, 2005	Jakub Cutta	1-year	Re-signing	
August 12, 2005	Louis Robitaille		Re-signing	
August 12, 2005	Matt Pettinger		Re-signing	
August 15, 2005	Steve Eminger		Re-signing	
August 15, 2005	Jeff Halpern		Re-signing	
August 15, 2005	Graham Mink		Re-signing	
August 15, 2005	Shaone Morrisonn		Re-signing	
August 15, 2005	Maxime Ouellet		Re-signing	
August 15, 2005	Stephen Peat	1-year	Re-signing	
August 15, 2005	Brian Sutherby		Re-signing	
August 15, 2005	Brian Willsie		Re-signing	
August 15, 2005	Brendan Witt		Re-signing	
August 15, 2005	Nolan Yonkman		Re-signing	
August 17, 2005	Chris Bourque	3-year	Entry-level	
August 17, 2005	Dwayne Zinger		Re-signing	
August 18, 2005	Dainius Zubrus	2-year	Re-signing	
August 23, 2005	Petr Sykora	1-year	Re-signing	
August 24, 2005	Chris Clark		Re-signing	
August 29, 2005	Mike Green	3-year	Entry-level	
August 30, 2005	Bryan Muir		Re-signing	
August 31, 2005	Jeff Schultz	3-year	Entry-level	
February 3, 2006	Chris Clark	2-year	Extension	
February 11, 2006	Olaf Kolzig	2-year	Extension	
February 22, 2006	Jamie Heward	1-year	Extension	
February 22, 2006	Bryan Muir	1-year	Extension	
March 14, 2006	Stephen Werner	2-year	Entry-level	
March 23, 2006	Daren Machesney	3-year	Entry-level	
April 11, 2006	Alexander Semin	2-year	Re-signing	

== Draft picks ==
Washington's draft picks at the 2005 NHL entry draft held at the Westin Hotel in Ottawa, Ontario.

Round	#	Player	Nationality	College/Junior/Club team
1	14	Sasha Pokulok (D)	Canada	Cornell University (ECAC)
1	27	Joe Finley (D)	United States	University of North Dakota (NCAA)
4	109	Andy Thomas (D)	United States	University of Denver (WCHA)
4	118	Patrick McNeill (D)	Canada	Saginaw Spirit (OHL)
5	143	Daren Machesney (G)	Canada	Brampton Battalion (OHL)
6	181	Tim Kennedy (LW)	United States	Sioux City Musketeers (USHL)
7	209	Viktor Dovgan (D)	Russia	CSKA Moscow Jr. (Russia)

== Farm teams ==
- Hershey Bears, American Hockey League
- South Carolina Stingrays, East Coast Hockey League
