= 2005–06 Chicago Blackhawks season =

National Hockey League team season

2005–06 Chicago Blackhawks
- Division: 4th Central
- Conference: 14th Western
- 2005–06 record: 26–43–13
- Home record: 16–19–6
- Road record: 10–24–7
- Goals for: 211
- Goals against: 285

Team information
- General manager: Dale Tallon
- Coach: Trent Yawney
- Captain: Adrian Aucoin; Martin Lapointe (interim)
- Alternate captains: Kyle Calder; Martin Lapointe
- Arena: United Center
- Average attendance: 13,318 (65.0%)
- Minor league affiliates: Norfolk Admirals; Greenville Grrrowl

Team leaders
- Goals: Kyle Calder (26)
- Assists: Kyle Calder (33)
- Points: Kyle Calder (59)
- Penalty minutes: Matthew Barnaby (178)
- Plus/minus: Jaroslav Spacek (+8)
- Wins: Nikolai Khabibulin (17)
- Goals against average: Adam Munro (2.99)

The 2005–06 Chicago Blackhawks season was the 80th season for the National Hockey League (NHL) franchise that was established on September 25, 1926.

== Off season ==
Defenseman Adrian Aucoin was named team captain.

== Regular season ==
The Blackhawks struggled on the power play during the regular season, finishing 30th overall in power-play goals scored, with 51, and 30th overall in power-play percentage, at 12.23% (51 for 417).

=== Final standings ===
Central Division
No.	CR		GP	W	L	OTL	GF	GA	Pts
1	1	**Detroit Red Wings**	82	58	16	8	305	209	124
2	4	**Nashville Predators**	82	49	25	8	259	227	106
3	13	Columbus Blue Jackets	82	35	43	4	223	279	74
4	14	Chicago Blackhawks	82	26	43	13	211	285	65
5	15	St. Louis Blues	82	21	46	15	197	292	57

Note: CR = Conference rank; GP = Games played; W = Wins; L = Losses; T = Ties; OTL = Overtime loss; GF = Goals for; GA = Goals against; Pts = Points
Bolded teams qualified for the playoffs.

Western Conference
R		Div	GP	W	L	OTL	GF	GA	Pts
**1**	**P-** Detroit Red Wings	**CE**	**82**	**58**	**16**	**8**	**305**	**209**	124
**2**	**Y-** Dallas Stars	**PA**	**82**	**53**	**23**	**6**	**265**	**218**	112
**3**	**Y-** Calgary Flames	**NW**	**82**	**46**	**25**	**11**	**218**	**200**	103
**4**	**X-** Nashville Predators	**CE**	**82**	**49**	**25**	**8**	**259**	**227**	106
**5**	**X-** San Jose Sharks	**PA**	**82**	**44**	**27**	**11**	**266**	**242**	99
**6**	**X-** Mighty Ducks of Anaheim	**PA**	**82**	**43**	**27**	**12**	**254**	**229**	98
**7**	**X-** Colorado Avalanche	**NW**	**82**	**43**	**30**	**9**	**283**	**257**	95
**8**	**X-** Edmonton Oilers	**NW**	**82**	**41**	**28**	**13**	**256**	**251**	95
8.5
9	Vancouver Canucks	NW	82	42	32	8	256	255	92
10	Los Angeles Kings	PA	82	42	35	5	249	270	89
11	Minnesota Wild	NW	82	38	36	8	231	215	84
12	Phoenix Coyotes	PA	82	38	39	5	246	271	81
13	Columbus Blue Jackets	CE	82	35	43	4	223	279	74
14	Chicago Blackhawks	CE	82	26	43	13	211	285	65
15	St. Louis Blues	CE	82	21	46	15	197	292	57

Divisions: CE – Central, PA – Pacific, NW – Northwest

P – Clinched Presidents Trophy; Y – Clinched division; X – Clinched playoff spot

== Schedule and results ==
2005–06 regular season
October: 3–8–0 (home: 2–3–0; road: 1–5–0)

Game	Date	Score	Opponent	Record	Recap
1	October 5, 2005	3–5	Mighty Ducks of Anaheim (2005–06)	0–1–0	L
2	October 7, 2005	6–3	San Jose Sharks (2005–06)	1–1–0	W
3	October 9, 2005	2–3	Columbus Blue Jackets (2005–06)	1–2–0	L
4	October 11, 2005	1–4	@ St. Louis Blues (2005–06)	1–3–0	L
5	October 14, 2005	3–2 SO	@ Colorado Avalanche (2005–06)	2–3–0	W
6	October 15, 2005	3–4	@ San Jose Sharks (2005–06)	2–4–0	L
7	October 18, 2005	2–6	@ Vancouver Canucks (2005–06)	2–5–0	L
8	October 23, 2005	4–2	Minnesota Wild (2005–06)	3–5–0	W
9	October 25, 2005	3–5	@ Nashville Predators (2005–06)	3–6–0	L
10	October 27, 2005	2–5	@ Detroit Red Wings (2005–06)	3–7–0	L
11	October 29, 2005	2–4	Detroit Red Wings (2005–06)	3–8–0	L

November: 7–6–0 (home: 3–1–0; road: 4–5–0)

Game	Date	Score	Opponent	Record	Recap
12	November 1, 2005	1–4	@ Detroit Red Wings (2005–06)	3–9–0	L
13	November 2, 2005	6–5 OT	@ St. Louis Blues (2005–06)	4–9–0	W
14	November 4, 2005	1–9	@ Dallas Stars (2005–06)	4–10–0	L
15	November 6, 2005	2–1 OT	Phoenix Coyotes (2005–06)	5–10–0	W
16	November 10, 2005	4–2	@ St. Louis Blues (2005–06)	6–10–0	W
17	November 11, 2005	2–4	Los Angeles Kings (2005–06)	6–11–0	L
18	November 13, 2005	3–1	Edmonton Oilers (2005–06)	7–11–0	W
19	November 18, 2005	5–2	@ Calgary Flames (2005–06)	8–11–0	W
20	November 19, 2005	4–3	@ Edmonton Oilers (2005–06)	9–11–0	W
21	November 22, 2005	1–3	@ Vancouver Canucks (2005–06)	9–12–0	L
22	November 26, 2005	2–3	@ Los Angeles Kings (2005–06)	9–13–0	L
23	November 27, 2005	1–3	@ Mighty Ducks of Anaheim (2005–06)	9–14–0	L
24	November 30, 2005	3–2	Los Angeles Kings (2005–06)	10–14–0	W

December: 3–6–4 (home: 2–4–1; road: 1–2–3)

Game	Date	Score	Opponent	Record	Recap
25	December 2, 2005	2–3 SO	@ Tampa Bay Lightning (2005–06)	10–14–1	OTL
26	December 3, 2005	3–4 OT	@ Florida Panthers (2005–06)	10–14–2	OTL
27	December 7, 2005	2–1 OT	New York Rangers (2005–06)	11–14–2	W
28	December 11, 2005	5–4 SO	@ Atlanta Thrashers (2005–06)	12–14–2	W
29	December 13, 2005	3–5	@ Carolina Hurricanes (2005–06)	12–15–2	L
30	December 15, 2005	3–5	@ Nashville Predators (2005–06)	12–16–2	L
31	December 16, 2005	5–1	St. Louis Blues (2005–06)	13–16–2	W
32	December 18, 2005	3–5	Dallas Stars (2005–06)	13–17–2	L
33	December 21, 2005	1–6	Nashville Predators (2005–06)	13–18–2	L
34	December 23, 2005	2–3 OT	Detroit Red Wings (2005–06)	13–18–3	OTL
35	December 26, 2005	3–4 OT	@ Columbus Blue Jackets (2005–06)	13–18–4	OTL
36	December 28, 2005	1–2	St. Louis Blues (2005–06)	13–19–4	L
37	December 30, 2005	2–3	Columbus Blue Jackets (2005–06)	13–20–4	L

January: 4–8–2 (home: 3–5–2; road: 1–3–0)

Game	Date	Score	Opponent	Record	Recap
38	January 2, 2006	2–3	@ Calgary Flames (2005–06)	13–21–4	L
39	January 3, 2006	0–5	@ Edmonton Oilers (2005–06)	13–22–4	L
40	January 5, 2006	2–3	Vancouver Canucks (2005–06)	13–23–4	L
41	January 8, 2006	1–5	Nashville Predators (2005–06)	13–24–4	L
42	January 10, 2006	4–3 OT	@ Washington Capitals (2005–06)	14–24–4	W
43	January 11, 2006	2–5	Philadelphia Flyers (2005–06)	14–25–4	L
44	January 13, 2006	4–1	Pittsburgh Penguins (2005–06)	15–25–4	W
45	January 15, 2006	2–3 SO	New Jersey Devils (2005–06)	15–25–5	OTL
46	January 17, 2006	1–2 OT	New York Islanders (2005–06)	15–25–6	OTL
47	January 19, 2006	4–2	Colorado Avalanche (2005–06)	16–25–6	W
48	January 20, 2006	1–4	@ Minnesota Wild (2005–06)	16–26–6	L
49	January 22, 2006	2–3	Minnesota Wild (2005–06)	16–27–6	L
50	January 26, 2006	2–0	Calgary Flames (2005–06)	17–27–6	W
51	January 29, 2006	3–5	Calgary Flames (2005–06)	17–28–6	L

February: 1–3–2 (home: 0–0–0; road: 1–3–2)

Game	Date	Score	Opponent	Record	Recap
52	February 2, 2006	5–6 SO	@ St. Louis Blues (2005–06)	17–28–7	OTL
53	February 4, 2006	0–6	@ Nashville Predators (2005–06)	17–29–7	L
54	February 7, 2006	3–1	@ Phoenix Coyotes (2005–06)	18–29–7	W
55	February 8, 2006	1–2	@ San Jose Sharks (2005–06)	18–30–7	L
56	February 11, 2006	4–5 OT	@ Los Angeles Kings (2005–06)	18–30–8	OTL
57	February 12, 2006	1–4	@ Mighty Ducks of Anaheim (2005–06)	18–31–8	L

March: 5–7–3 (home: 3–5–2; road: 2–2–1)

Game	Date	Score	Opponent	Record	Recap
58	March 1, 2006	3–0	Nashville Predators (2005–06)	19–31–8	W
59	March 3, 2006	4–5 SO	Vancouver Canucks (2005–06)	19–31–9	OTL
60	March 5, 2006	2–7	Dallas Stars (2005–06)	19–32–9	L
61	March 7, 2006	3–1	@ Columbus Blue Jackets (2005–06)	20–32–9	W
62	March 9, 2006	1–2	Colorado Avalanche (2005–06)	20–33–9	L
63	March 11, 2006	4–6	@ Detroit Red Wings (2005–06)	20–34–9	L
64	March 12, 2006	3–5	Detroit Red Wings (2005–06)	20–35–9	L
65	March 15, 2006	3–2	Columbus Blue Jackets (2005–06)	21–35–9	W
66	March 17, 2006	1–2	Mighty Ducks of Anaheim (2005–06)	21–36–9	L
67	March 19, 2006	2–3	Phoenix Coyotes (2005–06)	21–37–9	L
68	March 23, 2006	3–4	@ Phoenix Coyotes (2005–06)	21–38–9	L
69	March 24, 2006	2–3 SO	@ Dallas Stars (2005–06)	21–38–10	OTL
70	March 26, 2006	4–5 OT	San Jose Sharks (2005–06)	21–38–11	OTL
71	March 29, 2006	3–2 OT	St. Louis Blues (2005–06)	22–38–11	W
72	March 31, 2006	3–2 OT	@ Detroit Red Wings (2005–06)	23–38–11	W

April: 3–5–2 (home: 3–1–1; road: 0–4–1)

Game	Date	Score	Opponent	Record	Recap
73	April 1, 2006	2–5	@ Columbus Blue Jackets (2005–06)	23–39–11	L
74	April 3, 2006	3–4	@ Colorado Avalanche (2005–06)	23–40–11	L
75	April 5, 2006	4–3	Nashville Predators (2005–06)	24–40–11	W
76	April 7, 2006	3–4 OT	Edmonton Oilers (2005–06)	24–40–12	OTL
77	April 8, 2006	1–2 SO	@ Nashville Predators (2005–06)	24–40–13	OTL
78	April 11, 2006	0–2	@ Minnesota Wild (2005–06)	24–41–13	L
79	April 13, 2006	3–7	Detroit Red Wings (2005–06)	24–42–13	L
80	April 15, 2006	2–5	@ Columbus Blue Jackets (2005–06)	24–43–13	L
81	April 16, 2006	4–3	Columbus Blue Jackets (2005–06)	25–43–13	W
82	April 18, 2006	3–2 OT	St. Louis Blues (2005–06)	26–43–13	W

Legend: W Win (2 points) L Loss (0 points) OTL Overtime/shootout loss (1 point)

== Player statistics ==
=== Scoring ===
- Position abbreviations: C = Center; D = Defense; G = Goaltender; LW = Left wing; RW = Right wing
- † = Joined team via a transaction (e.g., trade, waivers, signing) during the season. Stats reflect time with the Blackhawks only.
- ‡ = Left team via a transaction (e.g., trade, waivers, release) during the season. Stats reflect time with the Blackhawks only.

No.	Player	Pos	Regular season					
No.	Player	Pos	GP	G	A	Pts	+/-	PIM
19	Kyle Calder	LW	79	26	33	59	−4	52
28	Mark Bell	C	82	25	23	48	−14	107
39	Tyler Arnason‡	C	60	13	28	41	5	40
14	Rene Bourque	LW	77	16	18	34	3	56
16	Radim Vrbata†	RW	45	13	21	34	4	16
7	Brent Seabrook	D	69	5	27	32	5	60
22	Martin Lapointe	RW	82	14	17	31	−30	106
36	Matthew Barnaby	RW	82	8	20	28	−11	178
6	Jaroslav Spacek‡	D	45	7	17	24	8	72
23	Jim Vandermeer	D	76	6	18	24	−2	116
10	Patrick Sharp†	C	50	9	14	23	1	36
2	Duncan Keith	D	81	9	12	21	−11	79
32	Pavel Vorobiev	RW	39	9	12	21	−2	34
17	Michael Holmqvist	C	72	10	10	20	−14	16
48	Mark Cullen	C	29	7	9	16	7	2
37	Curtis Brown	C	71	5	10	15	−9	38
34	Jim Dowd‡	C	60	3	12	15	−5	38
16	Matt Ellison‡	RW	26	3	9	12	−4	17
20	Andy Hilbert†‡	C	28	5	4	9	−4	22
43	James Wisniewski	D	19	2	5	7	0	36
26	Milan Bartovic	RW	24	1	6	7	0	8
5	Jassen Cullimore	D	54	1	6	7	−24	53
33	Adrian Aucoin	D	33	1	5	6	−13	38
52	Dustin Byfuglien	RW	25	3	2	5	−6	24
8	Anton Babchuk‡	D	17	2	3	5	−5	16
15	Tuomo Ruutu	C	15	2	3	5	−7	31
20	Brandon Bochenski†	RW	20	2	2	4	−9	8
12	Mikhail Yakubov†‡	C	10	1	2	3	0	8
27	Todd Simpson‡	D	45	0	3	3	−2	116
38	Jason Morgan	C	7	1	1	2	1	6
31	Craig Anderson‡†	G	29	0	1	1		14
42	Michal Barinka	D	25	0	1	1	−7	20
56	Mike Brown	LW	2	0	1	1	0	9
53	Nikolai Khabibulin	G	50	0	1	1		10
30	Adam Munro	G	10	0	1	1		0
25	Cam Barker	D	1	0	0	0	0	0
50	Corey Crawford	G	2	0	0	0		0
55	Eric Daze	RW	1	0	0	0	−2	2
11	Matt Keith	RW	2	0	0	0	0	0
44	Danny Richmond†	D	10	0	0	0	−3	18
47	Martin St. Pierre†	C	2	0	0	0	−1	0
29	Shawn Thornton	RW	10	0	0	0	−5	16

=== Goaltending ===
- † = Joined team via a transaction (e.g., trade, waivers, signing) during the season. Stats reflect time with the Blackhawks only.
- ‡ = Left team via a transaction (e.g., trade, waivers, release) during the season. Stats reflect time with the Blackhawks only.

No.	Player	Regular season									
No.	Player	GP	W	L	OT	SA	GA	GAA	SV%	SO	TOI
53	Nikolai Khabibulin	50	17	26	6	1379	157	3.35	.886	0	2815
31	Craig Anderson‡†	29	6	12	4	757	86	3.32	.886	1	1554
30	Adam Munro	10	3	5	2	234	25	2.99	.893	1	501
50	Corey Crawford	2	0	0	1	41	5	3.49	.878	0	86

== Awards and records ==
=== Milestones ===
Milestone	Player	Date	Ref
First game	Rene Bourque	October 5, 2005	
First game	Duncan Keith	October 5, 2005	
First game	Brent Seabrook	October 5, 2005	
First game	Cam Barker	October 14, 2005	
First game	Martin St. Pierre	November 4, 2005	
First game	Mark Cullen	November 10, 2005	
First game	Corey Crawford	January 22, 2006	
First game	James Wisniewski	February 2, 2006	
First game	Dustin Byfuglien	March 1, 2006	
500th game played	Nikolai Khabibulin	December 11, 2005	

== Transactions ==
The Blackhawks were involved in the following transactions from February 17, 2005, the day after the 2004–05 NHL season was officially cancelled, through June 19, 2006, the day of the deciding game of the 2006 Stanley Cup Finals.

=== Trades ===
Date	Details		Ref
July 30, 2005	To Anaheim Mighty Ducks: Travis Moen	To Chicago Blackhawks: Michael Holmqvist	
August 10, 2005	To Pittsburgh Penguins: Jocelyn Thibault	To Chicago Blackhawks: 4th-round pick in 2006	
August 22, 2005	To Vancouver Canucks: Steve McCarthy	To Chicago Blackhawks: 3rd-round pick in 2007	
October 4, 2005	To Buffalo Sabres: Michael Leighton	To Chicago Blackhawks: Milan Bartovic	
November 6, 2005	To Boston Bruins: 5th-round pick in 2006	To Chicago Blackhawks: Andy Hilbert	
December 5, 2005	To Philadelphia Flyers: Matt Ellison; 3rd-round pick in 2006	To Chicago Blackhawks: Eric Meloche; Patrick Sharp	
December 29, 2005	To Carolina Hurricanes: Future considerations	To Chicago Blackhawks: Radim Vrbata	
January 20, 2006	To Carolina Hurricanes: Anton Babchuk; 4th-round pick in 2007	To Chicago Blackhawks: Danny Richmond; Columbus’ 4th-round pick in 2006	
January 26, 2006	To Edmonton Oilers: Jaroslav Spacek	To Chicago Blackhawks: Rights to Tony Salmelainen	
March 9, 2006	To Montreal Canadiens: Todd Simpson	To Chicago Blackhawks: 6th-round pick in 2006	
March 9, 2006	To Ottawa Senators: Tyler Arnason	To Chicago Blackhawks: Brandon Bochenski; 2nd-round pick in 2006	
March 9, 2006	To Colorado Avalanche: Jim Dowd	To Chicago Blackhawks: 4th-round pick in 2006	

=== Players acquired ===
Date	Player	Former team	Term	Via	Ref
August 2, 2005	Adrian Aucoin	New York Islanders	4-year	Free agency	
August 3, 2005	Martin Lapointe	Boston Bruins	3-year	Free agency	
August 3, 2005	Jaroslav Spacek	Florida Panthers	1-year	Free agency	
August 4, 2005	Mark Cullen	Minnesota Wild	1-year	Free agency	
August 5, 2005	Jim Dowd	Hamburg Freezers (DEL)	1-year	Free agency	
August 5, 2005	Nikolai Khabibulin	Tampa Bay Lightning	4-year	Free agency	
August 10, 2005	Mike Brown	Norfolk Admirals (AHL)	1-year	Free agency	
August 23, 2005	Todd Simpson	Herning Blue Fox (Denmark)	1-year	Free agency	
November 3, 2005	Martin St. Pierre	Norfolk Admirals (AHL)	1-year	Free agency	
February 3, 2006	Craig Anderson	St. Louis Blues		Waivers	

=== Players lost ===
Date	Player	New team	Via (Note: In parentheses is the player's free agency group on August 1 if applicable.)	Ref
August 3, 2005	Bryan Berard	Columbus Blue Jackets	Free agency (UFA)	
August 6, 2005	Scott Nichol	Nashville Predators	Free agency (V)	
August 6, 2005	Stephane Robidas	Dallas Stars	Free agency (UFA)	
August 11, 2005	Marty Wilford	Los Angeles Kings	Free agency (VI)	
August 15, 2005	Steve Poapst	Pittsburgh Penguins	Free agency (III)	
August 23, 2005	Eric Nickulas	Boston Bruins	Free agency (UFA)	
September 2005	Brandin Cote	Nottingham Panthers (EIHL)	Free agency (UFA)	
September 13, 2005	Scott Balan	Bakersfield Condors (ECHL)	Free agency (UFA)	
January 19, 2006	Craig Anderson	Boston Bruins	Waivers	
January 28, 2006	Mikhail Yakubov	Florida Panthers	Waivers	
March 9, 2006	Andy Hilbert	Pittsburgh Penguins	Waivers	

=== Signings ===
Date	Player	Term	Contract type	Ref
July 28, 2005	Dustin Byfuglien	3-year	Entry-level	
July 28, 2005	Corey Crawford	3-year	Entry-level	
July 28, 2005	Colin Fraser	3-year	Entry-level	
July 28, 2005	Brent Seabrook	3-year	Entry-level	
August 3, 2005	Shawn Thornton	1-year	Re-signing	
August 9, 2005	Ajay Baines	1-year	Re-signing	
August 10, 2005	Tyler Arnason	1-year	Re-signing	
August 10, 2005	Mark Bell	1-year	Re-signing	
August 22, 2005	Craig Anderson	1-year	Re-signing	
August 22, 2005	Cam Barker	3-year	Entry-level	
August 22, 2005	Michael Holmqvist	1-year	Re-signing	
August 22, 2005	Quintin Laing	1-year	Re-signing	
August 22, 2005	Michael Leighton	1-year	Re-signing	
November 30, 2005	Andy Hilbert	1-year	Re-signing	
November 30, 2005	Mikhail Yakubov	1-year	Re-signing	
May 16, 2006	Adam Burish	2-year	Entry-level	
May 24, 2006	Mike Blunden	3-year	Entry-level	
May 25, 2006	Dave Bolland	3-year	Entry-level	
May 26, 2006	Adam Berti	3-year	Entry-level	
June 5, 2006	Bryan Bickell	3-year	Entry-level	
June 5, 2006	Troy Brouwer	3-year	Entry-level	
June 5, 2006	Jonas Nordquist	1-year	Entry-level	

== Draft picks ==
Chicago's draft picks at the 2005 NHL entry draft held at the Westin Hotel in Ottawa, Ontario.

Round	#	Player	Nationality	College/Junior/Club team (League)
1	7	Jack Skille	United States	US NTDP (NAHL)
2	43	Michael Blunden	Canada	Erie Otters (OHL)
2	54	Dan Bertram	Canada	Boston College (Hockey East)
3	68	Evan Brophey	Canada	Belleville Bulls (OHL)
4	108	Niklas Hjalmarsson	Sweden	HV71 Jr. (Sweden)
4	113	Nathan Davis	United States	Miami University (CCHA)
4	117	Denis Istomin	Russia	Traktor Chelyabinsk (Russia)
5	134	Brennan Turner	Canada	Notre Dame Hounds (SJHL)
6	167	Joe Fallon	United States	University of Vermont (ECAC)
6	188	Joe Charlebois	United States	Sioux City Musketeers (USHL)
7	202	David Kuchejda	Czech Republic	HC Ceske Budejovice (Czech Republic)
7	203	Adam Hobson	Canada	Spokane Chiefs (WHL)

== See also ==
- 2005–06 NHL season
