= 2005–06 Los Angeles Kings season =

National Hockey League team season

2005–06 Los Angeles Kings
- Division: 4th Pacific
- Conference: 10th Western
- 2005–06 record: 42–35–5
- Home record: 26–14–1
- Road record: 16–21–4
- Goals for: 249
- Goals against: 270

Team information
- General manager: Dave Taylor
- Coach: Andy Murray (Oct.–Mar.); John Torchetti (Mar.–Apr.)
- Captain: Mattias Norstrom; Luc Robitaille (one game)
- Alternate captains: Craig Conroy; Aaron Miller; Mattias Norstrom (one game); Luc Robitaille; Jeremy Roenick
- Arena: Staples Center
- Average attendance: 17,821
- Minor league affiliates: Manchester Monarchs; Reading Royals

Team leaders
- Goals: Michael Cammalleri (26)
- Assists: Lubomir Visnovsky (50)
- Points: Lubomir Visnovsky (67)
- Penalty minutes: Sean Avery (257)
- Plus/minus: Pavol Demitra (+21)
- Wins: Mathieu Garon (31)
- Goals against average: Jason LaBarbera (2.89)

The 2005–06 Los Angeles Kings season was the 39th season (38th season of play) for the National Hockey League (NHL) franchise. It began with wholesale changes, as during the off-season the Kings acquired centers Pavol Demitra and Jeremy Roenick to help solidify their offense, as well as goaltender Jason LaBarbera.

The changes appeared to pay off, as the Kings stormed out to a 15–6–1 record, and first place in the division. The team, however, collapsed, winning only 27 of their remaining 60 games, finishing fourth in the Pacific Division, and out of the playoffs for the third consecutive season. Head Coach Andy Murray was fired for their final 12 games with John Torchetti taking over, despite the team finishing with an impressive 42 wins.

== Regular season ==
- January 19, 2006 – Luc Robitaille becomes the Kings' all-time leading goal scorer.

The Kings finished the regular season with the most power play opportunities, tying the Phoenix Coyotes with 541. They also finished 30th overall in penalty-kill percentage, at 78.73%.

=== Final standings ===
Pacific Division
No.	CR		GP	W	L	OTL	GF	GA	Pts
1	2	Dallas Stars	82	53	23	6	265	218	112
2	5	San Jose Sharks	82	44	27	11	266	242	99
3	6	Mighty Ducks of Anaheim	82	43	27	12	254	229	98
4	10	Los Angeles Kings	82	42	35	5	249	270	89
5	12	Phoenix Coyotes	82	38	39	5	246	271	81

Western Conference
R		Div	GP	W	L	OTL	GF	GA	Pts
1	P- Detroit Red Wings	CE	82	58	16	8	305	209	124
2	Y- Dallas Stars	PA	82	53	23	6	265	218	112
3	Y- Calgary Flames	NW	82	46	25	11	218	200	103
4	X- Nashville Predators	CE	82	49	25	8	259	227	106
5	X- San Jose Sharks	PA	82	44	27	11	266	242	99
6	X- Mighty Ducks of Anaheim	PA	82	43	27	12	254	229	98
7	X- Colorado Avalanche	NW	82	43	30	9	283	257	95
8	X- Edmonton Oilers	NW	82	41	28	13	256	251	95
8.5
9	Vancouver Canucks	NW	82	42	32	8	256	255	92
10	Los Angeles Kings	PA	82	42	35	5	249	270	89
11	Minnesota Wild	NW	82	38	36	8	231	215	84
12	Phoenix Coyotes	PA	82	38	39	5	246	271	81
13	Columbus Blue Jackets	CE	82	35	43	4	223	279	74
14	Chicago Blackhawks	CE	82	26	43	13	211	285	65
15	St. Louis Blues	CE	82	21	46	15	197	292	57

Divisions: CE – Central, PA – Pacific, NW – Northwest

P – Clinched Presidents Trophy; Y – Clinched division; X – Clinched playoff spot

== Schedule and results ==
2005–06 regular season
October: 8–4–0 (home: 6–3–0; road: 2–1–0)

Game	Date	Score	Opponent	Record	Recap
1	October 5, 2005	4–5	@ Dallas Stars (2005–06)	0–1–0	L
2	October 6, 2005	3–2	Phoenix Coyotes (2005–06)	1–1–0	W
3	October 9, 2005	2–1 OT	Minnesota Wild (2005–06)	2–1–0	W
4	October 11, 2005	3–1	Edmonton Oilers (2005–06)	3–1–0	W
5	October 13, 2005	2–5	Detroit Red Wings (2005–06)	3–2–0	L
6	October 16, 2005	3–1	Columbus Blue Jackets (2005–06)	4–2–0	W
7	October 19, 2005	5–4	@ Colorado Avalanche (2005–06)	5–2–0	W
8	October 20, 2005	7–2	@ Dallas Stars (2005–06)	6–2–0	W
9	October 23, 2005	2–3	Calgary Flames (2005–06)	6–3–0	L
10	October 25, 2005	3–1	Mighty Ducks of Anaheim (2005–06)	7–3–0	W
11	October 28, 2005	4–5	San Jose Sharks (2005–06)	7–4–0	L
12	October 29, 2005	5–2	St. Louis Blues (2005–06)	8–4–0	W

November: 8–5–1 (home: 4–1–0; road: 4–4–1)

Game	Date	Score	Opponent	Record	Recap
13	November 2, 2005	6–3	@ Dallas Stars (2005–06)	9–4–0	W
14	November 3, 2005	0–4	@ Phoenix Coyotes (2005–06)	9–5–0	L
15	November 5, 2005	3–2 SO	Nashville Predators (2005–06)	10–5–0	W
16	November 9, 2005	4–5 OT	@ Detroit Red Wings (2005–06)	10–5–1	OTL
17	November 11, 2005	4–2	@ Chicago Blackhawks (2005–06)	11–5–1	W
18	November 13, 2005	8–2	@ Columbus Blue Jackets (2005–06)	12–5–1	W
19	November 15, 2005	2–3	@ Nashville Predators (2005–06)	12–6–1	L
20	November 17, 2005	5–4	Vancouver Canucks (2005–06)	13–6–1	W
21	November 19, 2005	4–3	Colorado Avalanche (2005–06)	14–6–1	W
22	November 22, 2005	6–3	@ St. Louis Blues (2005–06)	15–6–1	W
23	November 24, 2005	3–4	@ Nashville Predators (2005–06)	15–7–1	L
24	November 26, 2005	3–2	Chicago Blackhawks (2005–06)	16–7–1	W
25	November 28, 2005	2–5	Detroit Red Wings (2005–06)	16–8–1	L
26	November 30, 2005	2–3	@ Chicago Blackhawks (2005–06)	16–9–1	L

December: 9–5–1 (home: 3–2–0; road: 6–3–1)

Game	Date	Score	Opponent	Record	Recap
27	December 2, 2005	1–5	@ Ottawa Senators (2005–06)	16–10–1	L
28	December 3, 2005	2–3	@ Montreal Canadiens (2005–06)	16–11–1	L
29	December 6, 2005	2–1	@ Toronto Maple Leafs (2005–06)	17–11–1	W
30	December 8, 2005	2–3	Carolina Hurricanes (2005–06)	17–12–1	L
31	December 10, 2005	3–1	Florida Panthers (2005–06)	18–12–1	W
32	December 14, 2005	2–3	Washington Capitals (2005–06)	18–13–1	L
33	December 16, 2005	4–3 SO	@ Mighty Ducks of Anaheim (2005–06)	19–13–1	W
34	December 17, 2005	4–1	Phoenix Coyotes (2005–06)	20–13–1	W
35	December 19, 2005	4–3 SO	@ Vancouver Canucks (2005–06)	21–13–1	W
36	December 21, 2005	5–2	@ Calgary Flames (2005–06)	22–13–1	W
37	December 23, 2005	3–5	@ Edmonton Oilers (2005–06)	22–14–1	L
38	December 26, 2005	4–3	San Jose Sharks (2005–06)	23–14–1	W
39	December 28, 2005	5–3	@ Colorado Avalanche (2005–06)	24–14–1	W
40	December 29, 2005	5–6 OT	@ Phoenix Coyotes (2005–06)	24–14–2	OTL
41	December 31, 2005	3–2	@ Dallas Stars (2005–06)	25–14–2	W

January: 5–7–2 (home: 4–3–1; road: 1–4–1)

Game	Date	Score	Opponent	Record	Recap
42	January 2, 2006	3–2 OT	Dallas Stars (2005–06)	26–14–2	W
43	January 5, 2006	4–0	Phoenix Coyotes (2005–06)	27–14–2	W
44	January 7, 2006	2–3	@ San Jose Sharks (2005–06)	27–15–2	L
45	January 9, 2006	2–6	@ Mighty Ducks of Anaheim (2005–06)	27–16–2	L
46	January 12, 2006	6–0	@ Boston Bruins (2005–06)	28–16–2	W
47	January 14, 2006	1–10	@ Buffalo Sabres (2005–06)	28–17–2	L
48	January 17, 2006	1–4	Tampa Bay Lightning (2005–06)	28–18–2	L
49	January 19, 2006	8–6	Atlanta Thrashers (2005–06)	29–18–2	W
50	January 21, 2006	3–4 OT	San Jose Sharks (2005–06)	29–18–3	OTL
51	January 23, 2006	3–2 SO	Mighty Ducks of Anaheim (2005–06)	30–18–3	W
52	January 24, 2006	1–4	@ San Jose Sharks (2005–06)	30–19–3	L
53	January 26, 2006	3–5	Edmonton Oilers (2005–06)	30–20–3	L
54	January 28, 2006	2–6	Mighty Ducks of Anaheim (2005–06)	30–21–3	L
55	January 30, 2006	3–4 OT	@ Mighty Ducks of Anaheim (2005–06)	30–21–4	OTL

February: 2–2–1 (home: 2–0–0; road: 0–2–1)

Game	Date	Score	Opponent	Record	Recap
56	February 2, 2006	1–2 SO	@ Phoenix Coyotes (2005–06)	30–21–5	OTL
57	February 7, 2006	1–5	@ Minnesota Wild (2005–06)	30–22–5	L
58	February 8, 2006	4–7	@ Columbus Blue Jackets (2005–06)	30–23–5	L
59	February 11, 2006	5–4 OT	Chicago Blackhawks (2005–06)	31–23–5	W
60	February 12, 2006	6–5	Dallas Stars (2005–06)	32–23–5	W

March: 6–8–0 (home: 4–3–0; road: 2–5–0)

Game	Date	Score	Opponent	Record	Recap
61	March 2, 2006	3–2	Minnesota Wild (2005–06)	33–23–5	W
62	March 4, 2006	3–2	Columbus Blue Jackets (2005–06)	34–23–5	W
63	March 7, 2006	3–2 OT	@ Minnesota Wild (2005–06)	35–23–5	W
64	March 9, 2006	3–7	@ Detroit Red Wings (2005–06)	35–24–5	L
65	March 11, 2006	2–1 SO	@ St. Louis Blues (2005–06)	36–24–5	W
66	March 13, 2006	3–4	@ San Jose Sharks (2005–06)	36–25–5	L
67	March 14, 2006	2–6	Phoenix Coyotes (2005–06)	36–26–5	L
68	March 16, 2006	1–4	Dallas Stars (2005–06)	36–27–5	L
69	March 18, 2006	3–1	St. Louis Blues (2005–06)	37–27–5	W
70	March 20, 2006	0–5	Colorado Avalanche (2005–06)	37–28–5	L
71	March 25, 2006	6–4	Nashville Predators (2005–06)	38–28–5	W
72	March 27, 2006	4–7	@ Vancouver Canucks (2005–06)	38–29–5	L
73	March 29, 2006	1–2	@ Calgary Flames (2005–06)	38–30–5	L
74	March 30, 2006	0–4	@ Edmonton Oilers (2005–06)	38–31–5	L

April: 4–4–0 (home: 3–2–0; road: 1–2–0)

Game	Date	Score	Opponent	Record	Recap
75	April 1, 2006	1–0	Dallas Stars (2005–06)	39–31–5	W
76	April 3, 2006	1–0	Vancouver Canucks (2005–06)	40–31–5	W
77	April 4, 2006	2–6	@ Mighty Ducks of Anaheim (2005–06)	40–32–5	L
78	April 6, 2006	0–5	San Jose Sharks (2005–06)	40–33–5	L
79	April 8, 2006	2–4	Mighty Ducks of Anaheim (2005–06)	40–34–5	L
80	April 13, 2006	0–3	@ Phoenix Coyotes (2005–06)	40–35–5	L
81	April 15, 2006	2–1 SO	Calgary Flames (2005–06)	41–35–5	W
82	April 17, 2006	4–0	@ San Jose Sharks (2005–06)	42–35–5	W

Legend: W Win (2 points) L Loss (0 points) OTL Overtime/shootout loss (1 point)

== Player statistics ==
=== Scoring ===
- Position abbreviations: C = Center; D = Defense; G = Goaltender; LW = Left wing; RW = Right wing
- † = Joined team via a transaction (e.g., trade, waivers, signing) during the season. Stats reflect time with the Kings only.
- ‡ = Left team via a transaction (e.g., trade, waivers, release) during the season. Stats reflect time with the Kings only.

No.	Player	Pos	Regular season					
No.	Player	Pos	GP	G	A	Pts	+/-	PIM
17	Lubomir Visnovsky	D	80	17	50	67	7	50
22	Craig Conroy	C	78	22	44	66	13	78
38	Pavol Demitra	LW	58	25	37	62	21	42
13	Michael Cammalleri	C	80	26	29	55	−14	50
24	Alexander Frolov	LW	69	21	33	54	17	40
7	Derek Armstrong	C	62	13	28	41	−2	46
6	Joe Corvo	D	81	14	26	40	16	38
19	Sean Avery	C	75	15	24	39	−5	257
25	Eric Belanger	C	65	17	20	37	−5	62
23	Dustin Brown	LW	79	14	14	28	−10	80
14	Mattias Norstrom	D	77	4	23	27	−3	58
20	Luc Robitaille	LW	65	15	9	24	−6	52
97	Jeremy Roenick	C	58	9	13	22	−5	36
29	Tom Kostopoulos	RW	76	8	14	22	−8	100
42	Tim Gleason	D	78	2	19	21	0	77
10	Nathan Dempsey	D	53	2	11	13	0	48
15	Jeff Cowan	LW	46	8	1	9	−8	73
43	Mike Weaver	D	53	0	9	9	−3	14
37	Mark Parrish†	RW	19	5	3	8	−9	4
3	Aaron Miller	D	56	0	8	8	−6	27
53	Jeff Giuliano	LW	48	3	4	7	0	26
57	George Parros	RW	55	2	3	5	1	138
31	Mathieu Garon	G	63	0	3	3		8
37	Denis Grebeshkov‡	D	8	0	2	2	−4	12
48	Petr Kanko	RW	10	1	0	1	1	0
35	Jason LaBarbera	G	29	0	1	1		0
9	Konstantin Pushkarev	RW	1	0	1	1	0	0
40	Matt Ryan	C	12	0	1	1	−4	2
5	Brent Sopel†	D	11	0	1	1	−4	6
77	Ken Belanger‡	LW	5	0	0	0	−1	7
39	Noah Clarke	LW	5	0	0	0	0	0
49	Ryan Flinn	LW	2	0	0	0	0	5
45	Adam Hauser	G	1	0	0	0		0
56	Connor James†	RW	2	0	0	0	−1	0
2	Richard Petiot	D	2	0	0	0	−2	2
51	Jeff Tambellini‡	LW	4	0	0	0	−1	2

=== Goaltending ===
No.	Player	Regular season									
No.	Player	GP	W	L	OT	SA	GA	GAA	SV%	SO	TOI
31	Mathieu Garon	63	31	26	3	1738	185	3.22	.894	4	3446
35	Jason LaBarbera	29	11	9	2	688	69	2.89	.900	1	1433
45	Adam Hauser	1	0	0	0	24	6	7.06	.750	0	51

== Awards and records ==
=== Awards ===
Type	Award/honor	Recipient	Ref
League (in-season)	NHL Defensive Player of the Month	Mathieu Garon (December)	
League (in-season)	NHL Offensive Player of the Week	Craig Conroy (October 24)	
Team	Ace Bailey Memorial Award	Mattias Norstrom	
Team	Bill Libby Memorial Award	Lubomir Visnovsky	
Team	Defensive Player	Mattias Norstrom	
Team	Jim Fox Community Service	Jeremy Roenick	
Team	Leading Scorer	Lubomir Visnovsky	
Team	Mark Bavis Memorial Award	Pavol Demitra	
Team	Most Popular Player	Luc Robitaille	
Team	Outstanding Defenseman	Lubomir Visnovsky	
Team	Unsung Hero	Craig Conroy	

=== Milestones ===
Milestone	Player	Date	Ref
First game	George Parros	October 5, 2005	
First game	Jeff Giuliano	November 5, 2005	
First game	Jeff Tambellini	November 30, 2005	
First game	Petr Kanko	December 16, 2005	
First game	Matt Ryan	December 31, 2005	
First game	Connor James	January 7, 2006	
First game	Adam Hauser	January 14, 2006	
First game	Richard Petiot	January 17, 2006	
First game	Konstantin Pushkarev	March 27, 2006	

== Transactions ==
The Kings were involved in the following transactions from February 17, 2005, the day after the 2004–05 NHL season was officially cancelled, through June 19, 2006, the day of the deciding game of the 2006 Stanley Cup Finals.

=== Trades ===
Date	Details		Ref
August 4, 2005	To Los Angeles Kings: Jeremy Roenick; Nashville’s 3rd-round pick in 2006	To Philadelphia Flyers: Future considerations	
August 12, 2005	To Los Angeles Kings: Future considerations	To Washington Capitals: Rights to Bryan Muir	
March 6, 2006	To Los Angeles Kings: Mark Parrish; Brent Sopel	To New York Islanders: Denis Grebeshkov; Jeff Tambellini; Conditional 3rd-round pick in 2006 (Note: The Islanders would receive the pick if Los Angeles made the playoffs.)	
March 9, 2006	To Los Angeles Kings: Tim Jackman	To Phoenix Coyotes: Yanick Lehoux	
April 21, 2006 (Note: Philadelphia received the draft pick as compensation for the Kings hiring Lombardi as their general manager. Lombardi was serving as a Western Conference scout with the Flyers.)	To Los Angeles Kings: Dean Lombardi	To Philadelphia Flyers: 2nd-round pick in 2006	

=== Players acquired ===
Date	Player	Former team	Term	Via	Ref
August 1, 2005	Tom Kostopoulos	Manchester Monarchs (AHL)	2-year	Free agency	
August 2, 2005	Pavol Demitra	HK Dukla Trencin (Slovakia)	3-year	Free agency	
August 2, 2005	Jason LaBarbera	New York Rangers	2-year	Free agency	
August 10, 2005	Marty Wilford	Chicago Blackhawks	2-year	Free agency	
August 12, 2005	Valeri Bure	Dallas Stars	1-year	Free agency	
August 12, 2005	Jeff Giuliano	Manchester Monarchs (AHL)	2-year	Free agency	
August 15, 2005	Brad Fast	Carolina Hurricanes	1-year	Free agency	
August 17, 2005	Shay Stephenson	IF Sundsvall (Allsvenskan)	3-year	Free agency	
August 24, 2005	Joey Mormina	Colgate University (ECAC)	3-year	Free agency	
September 30, 2005	Ken Belanger	Adirondack Frostbite (UHL)	1-year	Free agency	
November 25, 2005	Yanick Lehoux	Phoenix Coyotes		Waivers	
January 4, 2006	Connor James	Manchester Monarchs (AHL)	1-year	Free agency	
April 12, 2006	Peter Harrold	Boston College (HE)	3-year	Free agency	

=== Players lost ===
Date	Player	New team	Via (Note: In parentheses is the player's free agency group on August 1 if applicable.)	Ref
April 28, 2005	Esa Pirnes	Espoo Blues (Liiga)	Free agency (UFA)	
July 8, 2005	Jason Holland	ERC Ingolstadt (DEL)	Free agency (UFA)	
August 2, 2005	Martin Straka	New York Rangers	Free agency (III)	
August 4, 2005	Chris Schmidt	DEG Metro Stars (DEL)	Free agency (VI)	
August 8, 2005	Scott Barney	Atlanta Thrashers	Free agency (UFA)	
August 10, 2005	Joe Rullier	New York Rangers	Free agency (VI)	
August 16, 2005	Roman Cechmanek	HC Energie Karlovy Vary (ELH)	Free agency (III)	
August 22, 2005	Stephane Quintal		Retirement (III)	
September 7, 2005	Yanick Lehoux	Geneve-Servette HC (NLA)	Free agency (II) (Note: Los Angeles retained Lehoux’s NHL rights and re-signed him on November 3.)	
September 12, 2005	Trent Klatt		Retirement	
November 5, 2005	Yanick Lehoux	Phoenix Coyotes	Waivers	
November 14, 2005	Ken Belanger		Retirement	
April 10, 2006	Luc Robitaille		Retirement (Note: Effective at the end of the season.)	
April 21, 2006	Brad Smyth	Hamburg Freezers (DEL)	Free agency	

=== Signings ===
Date	Player	Term	Contract type	Ref
July 25, 2005	Luc Robitaille	1-year	Re-signing	
July 28, 2005	Ryan Munce	3-year	Entry-level	
July 28, 2005	Mike Weaver	1-year	Option exercised	
July 29, 2005	Ryan Flinn	1-year	Re-signing	
August 8, 2005	Eric Belanger	1-year	Re-signing	
August 10, 2005	Michael Cammalleri	1-year	Re-signing	
August 10, 2005	Adam Hauser	1-year	Re-signing	
August 11, 2005	Noah Clarke	2-year	Re-signing	
August 11, 2005	Yutaka Fukufuji	2-year	Entry-level	
August 11, 2005	Richard Petiot	2-year	Entry-level	
August 12, 2005	Alexander Frolov	5-year	Re-signing	
August 12, 2005	George Parros	2-year	Re-signing	
August 15, 2005	Joe Corvo	1-year	Re-signing	
August 15, 2005	Jeff Tambellini	multi-year	Entry-level	
August 16, 2005	Dany Roussin	multi-year	Entry-level	
August 23, 2005	Lauri Tukonen	multi-year	Entry-level	
September 6, 2005	Anze Kopitar	multi-year	Entry-level	
November 3, 2005	Yanick Lehoux		Re-signing	
March 6, 2006	Mattias Norstrom	2-year	Extension	
June 1, 2006	Ned Lukacevic	multi-year	Entry-level	
June 1, 2006	Danny Taylor	multi-year	Entry-level	

== Draft picks ==
Los Angeles's picks at the 2005 NHL entry draft held at the Westin Hotel in Ottawa, Ontario on July 30, 2005.

Round	#	Player	Nationality	College/Junior/Club team (League)
1	11	Anze Kopitar	Slovenia	Sodertalje SK (Sweden)
2	50	Dany Roussin	Canada	Rimouski Oceanic (QMJHL)
2	60	T. J. Fast	Canada	Tri-City Americans (WHL)
3	72	Jonathan Quick	United States	Avon Old Farms (USHS-CT)
5	139	Patrik Hersley	Sweden	Malmo Redhawks Jr. (Sweden)
6	184	Ryan McGinnis	United States	Plymouth Whalers (OHL)
7	206	Josh Meyers	United States	Sioux City Musketeers (USHL)
7	226	John Seymour	Canada	Brampton Battalion (OHL)

== See also ==
- 2005–06 NHL season
