= 2005–06 St. Louis Blues season =

National Hockey League team season

2005–06 St. Louis Blues
- Division: 5th Central
- Conference: 15th Western
- 2005–06 record: 21–46–15
- Home record: 12–23–6
- Road record: 9–23–9
- Goals for: 197
- Goals against: 292

Team information
- General manager: Larry Pleau
- Coach: Mike Kitchen
- Captain: Dallas Drake
- Alternate captains: Barret Jackman; Doug Weight (Oct.–Jan.); Scott Young (Jan.–Apr.)
- Arena: Savvis Center
- Average attendance: 14,213
- Minor league affiliates: Peoria Rivermen; Alaska Aces

Team leaders
- Goals: Mike Sillinger (22)
- Assists: Doug Weight (33)
- Points: Scott Young (49)
- Penalty minutes: Barret Jackman (156)
- Plus/minus: Simon Gamache (+1)
- Wins: Curtis Sanford (13)
- Goals against average: Curtis Sanford (2.66)

The 2005–06 St. Louis Blues season was the 39th for the franchise in St. Louis, Missouri, and the first since the 2004–05 NHL lockout. The Blues finished the regular season with a record of 21 wins, 46 losses and 15 losses in overtime, sufficient for an NHL season-low of 57 points. The Blues failed to qualify for the Stanley Cup playoffs for the first time since the 1978–79 season, ending their streak of consecutive playoff appearances at 25 seasons.

== Offseason ==
Dallas Drake was named team captain, following the retirement of previous captain Al MacInnis.

== Regular season ==
The Blues finished 30th overall in scoring, with just 192 goals for (excluding shootout-winning goals).

=== Final standings ===
Central Division
No.	CR		GP	W	L	OTL	GF	GA	Pts
1	1	**Detroit Red Wings**	82	58	16	8	305	209	124
2	4	**Nashville Predators**	82	49	25	8	259	227	106
3	13	Columbus Blue Jackets	82	35	43	4	223	279	74
4	14	Chicago Blackhawks	82	26	43	13	211	285	65
5	15	St. Louis Blues	82	21	46	15	197	292	57

Note: CR = Conference rank; GP = Games played; W = Wins; L = Losses; T = Ties; OTL = Overtime loss; GF = Goals for; GA = Goals against; Pts = Points
Bolded teams qualified for the playoffs.

Western Conference
R		Div	GP	W	L	OTL	GF	GA	Pts
**1**	**P-** Detroit Red Wings	**CE**	**82**	**58**	**16**	**8**	**305**	**209**	124
**2**	**Y-** Dallas Stars	**PA**	**82**	**53**	**23**	**6**	**265**	**218**	112
**3**	**Y-** Calgary Flames	**NW**	**82**	**46**	**25**	**11**	**218**	**200**	103
**4**	**X-** Nashville Predators	**CE**	**82**	**49**	**25**	**8**	**259**	**227**	106
**5**	**X-** San Jose Sharks	**PA**	**82**	**44**	**27**	**11**	**266**	**242**	99
**6**	**X-** Mighty Ducks of Anaheim	**PA**	**82**	**43**	**27**	**12**	**254**	**229**	98
**7**	**X-** Colorado Avalanche	**NW**	**82**	**43**	**30**	**9**	**283**	**257**	95
**8**	**X-** Edmonton Oilers	**NW**	**82**	**41**	**28**	**13**	**256**	**251**	95
8.5
9	Vancouver Canucks	NW	82	42	32	8	256	255	92
8	Los Angeles Kings	PA	82	42	35	5	249	270	89
11	Minnesota Wild	NW	82	38	36	8	231	215	84
12	Phoenix Coyotes	PA	82	38	39	5	246	271	81
13	Columbus Blue Jackets	CE	82	35	43	4	223	279	74
14	Chicago Blackhawks	CE	82	26	43	13	211	285	65
15	St. Louis Blues	CE	82	21	46	15	197	292	57

Divisions: CE – Central, PA – Pacific, NW – Northwest

P – Clinched Presidents Trophy; Y – Clinched division; X – Clinched playoff spot

== Schedule and results ==
2005–06 regular season
October: 2–7–2 (home: 2–4–0; road: 0–3–2)

Game	Date	Score	Opponent	Record	Recap
1	October 5, 2005	1–5	@ Detroit Red Wings (2005–06)	0–1–0	L
2	October 6, 2005	3–4	Detroit Red Wings (2005–06)	0–2–0	L
3	October 8, 2005	6–7	San Jose Sharks (2005–06)	0–3–0	L
4	October 11, 2005	4–1	Chicago Blackhawks (2005–06)	1–3–0	W
5	October 15, 2005	1–4	Nashville Predators (2005–06)	1–4–0	L
6	October 19, 2005	3–2	Mighty Ducks of Anaheim (2005–06)	2–4–0	W
7	October 20, 2005	2–3 SO	@ Nashville Predators (2005–06)	2–4–1	OTL
8	October 22, 2005	2–3	Minnesota Wild (2005–06)	2–5–1	L
9	October 25, 2005	4–5 OT	@ Phoenix Coyotes (2005–06)	2–5–2	OTL
10	October 28, 2005	4–6	@ Mighty Ducks of Anaheim (2005–06)	2–6–2	L
11	October 29, 2005	2–5	@ Los Angeles Kings (2005–06)	2–7–2	L

November: 2–8–1 (home: 0–5–1; road: 2–3–0)

Game	Date	Score	Opponent	Record	Recap
12	November 2, 2005	5–6 OT	Chicago Blackhawks (2005–06)	2–7–3	OTL
13	November 4, 2005	2–7	Edmonton Oilers (2005–06)	2–8–3	L
14	November 6, 2005	1–4	Detroit Red Wings (2005–06)	2–9–3	L
15	November 9, 2005	1–3	@ Columbus Blue Jackets (2005–06)	2–10–3	L
16	November 10, 2005	2–4	Chicago Blackhawks (2005–06)	2–11–3	L
17	November 12, 2005	1–3	@ Nashville Predators (2005–06)	2–12–3	L
18	November 16, 2005	2–0	@ Columbus Blue Jackets (2005–06)	3–12–3	W
19	November 19, 2005	3–2	@ Detroit Red Wings (2005–06)	4–12–3	W
20	November 22, 2005	3–6	Los Angeles Kings (2005–06)	4–13–3	L
21	November 25, 2005	3–5	@ Minnesota Wild (2005–06)	4–14–3	L
22	November 26, 2005	3–4	Columbus Blue Jackets (2005–06)	4–15–3	L

December: 5–7–2 (home: 2–3–2; road: 3–4–0)

Game	Date	Score	Opponent	Record	Recap
23	December 1, 2005	4–1	Columbus Blue Jackets (2005–06)	5–15–3	W
24	December 6, 2005	3–6	New York Islanders (2005–06)	5–16–3	L
25	December 8, 2005	4–5	@ Tampa Bay Lightning (2005–06)	5–17–3	L
26	December 10, 2005	4–5 OT	New York Rangers (2005–06)	5–17–4	OTL
27	December 13, 2005	3–0	Pittsburgh Penguins (2005–06)	6–17–4	W
28	December 16, 2005	1–5	@ Chicago Blackhawks (2005–06)	6–18–4	L
29	December 17, 2005	2–5	Philadelphia Flyers (2005–06)	6–19–4	L
30	December 20, 2005	5–4	@ Phoenix Coyotes (2005–06)	7–19–4	W
31	December 21, 2005	3–6	@ Mighty Ducks of Anaheim (2005–06)	7–20–4	L
32	December 23, 2005	2–1 SO	@ San Jose Sharks (2005–06)	8–20–4	W
33	December 26, 2005	1–6	Dallas Stars (2005–06)	8–21–4	L
34	December 28, 2005	2–1	@ Chicago Blackhawks (2005–06)	9–21–4	W
35	December 29, 2005	0–3	@ Dallas Stars (2005–06)	9–22–4	L
36	December 31, 2005	4–5 SO	Mighty Ducks of Anaheim (2005–06)	9–22–5	OTL

January: 3–8–3 (home: 3–3–0; road: 0–5–3)

Game	Date	Score	Opponent	Record	Recap
37	January 2, 2006	4–1	Vancouver Canucks (2005–06)	10–22–5	W
38	January 4, 2006	3–4	Nashville Predators (2005–06)	10–23–5	L
39	January 5, 2006	0–3	@ Detroit Red Wings (2005–06)	10–24–5	L
40	January 9, 2006	1–6	@ Colorado Avalanche (2005–06)	10–25–5	L
41	January 12, 2006	1–3	@ Florida Panthers (2005–06)	10–26–5	L
42	January 13, 2006	0–2	@ Atlanta Thrashers (2005–06)	10–27–5	L
43	January 15, 2006	2–4	@ Carolina Hurricanes (2005–06)	10–28–5	L
44	January 17, 2006	3–5	New Jersey Devils (2005–06)	10–29–5	L
45	January 19, 2006	4–5 SO	@ Washington Capitals (2005–06)	10–29–6	OTL
46	January 20, 2006	3–4 SO	@ Columbus Blue Jackets (2005–06)	10–29–7	OTL
47	January 23, 2006	4–0	Vancouver Canucks (2005–06)	11–29–7	W
48	January 25, 2006	3–4 SO	@ Dallas Stars (2005–06)	11–29–8	OTL
49	January 26, 2006	3–5	Phoenix Coyotes (2005–06)	11–30–8	L
50	January 30, 2006	3–2 SO	Calgary Flames (2005–06)	12–30–8	W

February: 4–1–1 (home: 2–0–0; road: 2–1–1)

Game	Date	Score	Opponent	Record	Recap
51	February 1, 2006	2–3	@ Detroit Red Wings (2005–06)	12–31–8	L
52	February 2, 2006	6–5 SO	Chicago Blackhawks (2005–06)	13–31–8	W
53	February 4, 2006	4–3 OT	Dallas Stars (2005–06)	14–31–8	W
54	February 8, 2006	4–2	@ Vancouver Canucks (2005–06)	15–31–8	W
55	February 10, 2006	2–3 OT	@ Calgary Flames (2005–06)	15–31–9	OTL
56	February 12, 2006	5–4 SO	@ Edmonton Oilers (2005–06)	16–31–9	W

March: 4–8–4 (home: 2–4–3; road: 2–4–1)

Game	Date	Score	Opponent	Record	Recap
57	March 1, 2006	4–2	@ Edmonton Oilers (2005–06)	17–31–9	W
58	March 2, 2006	1–3	@ Calgary Flames (2005–06)	17–32–9	L
59	March 5, 2006	4–1	@ Vancouver Canucks (2005–06)	18–32–9	W
60	March 7, 2006	1–2 SO	Colorado Avalanche (2005–06)	18–32–10	OTL
61	March 10, 2006	2–1 OT	Minnesota Wild (2005–06)	19–32–10	W
62	March 11, 2006	1–2 SO	Los Angeles Kings (2005–06)	19–32–11	OTL
63	March 13, 2006	3–2 OT	Columbus Blue Jackets (2005–06)	20–32–11	W
64	March 16, 2006	2–5	@ San Jose Sharks (2005–06)	20–33–11	L
65	March 18, 2006	1–3	@ Los Angeles Kings (2005–06)	20–34–11	L
66	March 20, 2006	2–4	@ Nashville Predators (2005–06)	20–35–11	L
67	March 21, 2006	0–6	San Jose Sharks (2005–06)	20–36–11	L
68	March 23, 2006	2–7	Calgary Flames (2005–06)	20–37–11	L
69	March 25, 2006	2–3 OT	Colorado Avalanche (2005–06)	20–37–12	OTL
70	March 27, 2006	1–4	Detroit Red Wings (2005–06)	20–38–12	L
71	March 29, 2006	2–3 OT	@ Chicago Blackhawks (2005–06)	20–38–13	OTL
72	March 31, 2006	2–4	Columbus Blue Jackets (2005–06)	20–39–13	L

April: 1–7–2 (home: 1–4–0; road: 0–3–2)

Game	Date	Score	Opponent	Record	Recap
73	April 1, 2006	1–2	@ Nashville Predators (2005–06)	20–40–13	L
74	April 4, 2006	4–5 SO	@ Minnesota Wild (2005–06)	20–40–14	OTL
75	April 6, 2006	0–3	Nashville Predators (2005–06)	20–41–14	L
76	April 8, 2006	2–4	@ Colorado Avalanche (2005–06)	20–42–14	L
77	April 9, 2006	2–1	Edmonton Oilers (2005–06)	21–42–14	W
78	April 11, 2006	0–2	Nashville Predators (2005–06)	21–43–14	L
79	April 13, 2006	1–4	@ Columbus Blue Jackets (2005–06)	21–44–14	L
80	April 15, 2006	2–3	Detroit Red Wings (2005–06)	21–45–14	L
81	April 16, 2006	0–3	Phoenix Coyotes (2005–06)	21–46–14	L
82	April 18, 2006	2–3 OT	@ Chicago Blackhawks (2005–06)	21–46–15	OTL

Legend: W Win (2 points) L Loss (0 points) OTL Overtime/shootout loss (1 point)

== Player statistics ==
=== Scoring ===
- Position abbreviations: C = Center; D = Defense; G = Goaltender; LW = Left wing; RW = Right wing
- † = Joined team via a transaction (e.g., trade, waivers, signing) during the season. Stats reflect time with the Blues only.
- ‡ = Left team via a transaction (e.g., trade, waivers, release) during the season. Stats reflect time with the Blues only.

No.	Player	Pos	Regular season					
No.	Player	Pos	GP	G	A	Pts	+/-	PIM
48	Scott Young	RW	79	18	31	49	−32	52
39	Doug Weight‡	C	47	11	33	44	−11	50
18	Mike Sillinger‡	C	48	22	19	41	−17	49
26	Petr Cajanek	RW	71	10	31	41	−22	54
37	Dean McAmmond	C	78	15	22	37	−25	32
7	Keith Tkachuk	LW	41	15	21	36	−15	46
12	Lee Stempniak	RW	57	14	13	27	−10	22
9	Jay McClement	C	67	6	21	27	−23	30
21	Jamal Mayers	RW	67	15	11	26	−22	129
10	Dallas Drake	RW	62	2	24	26	−13	59
25	Dennis Wideman	D	67	8	16	24	−31	83
55	Christian Backman	D	52	6	12	18	−15	48
6	Eric Weinrich‡	D	59	1	16	17	−10	44
38	Kevin Dallman†	D	46	4	9	13	−15	21
54	Mike Glumac	RW	33	7	5	12	−8	33
42	Mark Rycroft	RW	80	6	4	10	−14	46
5	Barret Jackman	D	63	4	6	10	−6	156
4	Eric Brewer	D	32	6	3	9	−17	45
32	Vladimir Orszagh†	RW	16	4	5	9	−2	14
17	Ryan Johnson	C	65	3	6	9	−21	33
22 (Note: Hoggan wore number 59 on October 20.)	Jeff Hoggan	LW	52	2	6	8	−16	34
20	Simon Gamache†‡	C	15	3	4	7	1	10
23	Trent Whitfield	C	30	2	5	7	−3	14
20	Timofei Shishkanov†	LW	22	3	2	5	−1	6
33	Eric Boguniecki‡	C	9	1	4	5	−1	4
27	Bryce Salvador	D	46	1	4	5	−24	26
20	Andy Roach	D	5	1	2	3	0	10
47	Aaron Downey‡	RW	17	2	0	2	0	45
15	Peter Sejna	LW	6	1	1	2	1	4
28	Matt Walker	D	54	0	2	2	−7	79
29	Jeff Woywitka	D	26	0	2	2	−12	25
30	Jason Bacashihua	G	19	0	1	1		0
33	Steve Poapst†	D	41	0	1	1	−21	37
36	Jesse Boulerice†	RW	12	0	0	0	−4	13
62	Jon DiSalvatore	RW	5	0	0	0	−1	2
50	Reinhard Divis	G	12	0	0	0		0
53	Colin Hemingway	RW	3	0	0	0	−2	0
40	Patrick Lalime	G	31	0	0	0		0
1	Curtis Sanford	G	34	0	0	0		0
43	Mike Stuart	D	1	0	0	0	0	0
41	Michael Zigomanis†	C	2	0	0	0	0	0

=== Goaltending ===
No.	Player	Regular season									
No.	Player	GP}	W	L	OT	SA	GA	GAA	SV%	SO	TOI
1	Curtis Sanford	34	13	13	5	885	81	2.66	.908	3	1830
30	Jason Bacashihua	19	4	10	1	515	52	3.23	.899	0	966
40	Patrick Lalime	31	4	18	8	868	103	3.64	.881	0	1699
50	Reinhard Divis	12	0	5	1	231	37	4.67	.840	0	475

== Awards and records ==
=== Awards ===
Type	Award/honor	Recipient	Ref
League (in-season)	NHL Defensive Player of the Week	Curtis Sanford (November 21)	

=== Milestones ===
Milestone	Player	Date	Ref
First game	Jeff Hoggan	October 5, 2005	
First game	Jay McClement	October 5, 2005	
First game	Andy Roach	October 5, 2005	
First game	Lee Stempniak	October 6, 2005	
First game	Jeff Woywitka	October 6, 2005	
First game	Colin Hemingway	October 19, 2005	
First game	Dennis Wideman	November 9, 2005	
First game	Jason Bacashihua	December 16, 2005	
First game	Jon DiSalvatore	January 19, 2006	
First game	Mike Glumac	January 30, 2006	

== Transactions ==
The Blues were involved in the following transactions from February 17, 2005, the day after the 2004–05 NHL season was officially cancelled, through June 19, 2006, the day of the deciding game of the 2006 Stanley Cup Finals.

=== Trades ===
Date	Details		Ref
August 2, 2005	To Edmonton Oilers: Chris Pronger	To St. Louis Blues: Eric Brewer; Doug Lynch; Jeff Woywitka	
August 24, 2005	To Toronto Maple Leafs: John Pohl	To St. Louis Blues: Future considerations	
December 9, 2005	To Pittsburgh Penguins: Eric Boguniecki	To St. Louis Blues: Steve Poapst	
December 13, 2005	To Edmonton Oilers: Blake Evans	To St. Louis Blues: Future considerations	
January 29, 2006	To Nashville Predators: Mike Sillinger	To St. Louis Blues: Timofei Shishkanov	
January 30, 2006	To Carolina Hurricanes: Doug Weight; Rights to Erkki Rajamaki	To St. Louis Blues: Jesse Boulerice; Michael Zigomanis; Rights to Magnus Kahnberg; 1st-round pick in 2006; Toronto’s 4th-round pick in 2006; Chicago’s 4th-round pick in 2007	
March 9, 2006	To Vancouver Canucks: Eric Weinrich	To St. Louis Blues: Tomas Mojzis; 3rd-round pick in 2006	

=== Players acquired ===
Date	Player	Former team	Term	Via	Ref
August 1, 2005	Aaron Downey	Dallas Stars	1-year	Free agency	
August 2, 2005	Jeff Hoggan	Worcester IceCats (AHL)		Free agency	
August 2, 2005	Ryan Ramsay	Worcester IceCats (AHL)		Free agency	
August 2, 2005	Trent Whitfield	Washington Capitals		Free agency	
August 9, 2005	Dean McAmmond	Albany River Rats (AHL)		Free agency	
September 13, 2005	Scott Young	Memphis RiverKings (CHL)	1-year	Free agency	
November 29, 2005	Simon Gamache	Nashville Predators		Waivers	
December 3, 2005	Kevin Dallman	Boston Bruins		Waivers	
December 30, 2005	Vladimir Orszagh	Phoenix Coyotes		Waivers	
January 31, 2006	Craig Anderson	Boston Bruins		Waivers	

=== Players lost ===
Date	Player	New team	Via (Note: In parentheses is the player's free agency group on August 1 if applicable.)	Ref
July 1, 2005	Jame Pollock	Nurnberg Ice Tigers (DEL)	Free agency (VI)	
August 10, 2005	Alexander Khavanov	Toronto Maple Leafs	Free agency (III)	
August 29, 2005	Aris Brimanis	Kloten Flyers (NLA)	Free agency	
October 26, 2005	Brett Scheffelmaier		Retirement	
December 19, 2005	Erkki Rajamaki	Espoo Blues (Liiga)	Free agency (Note: St. Louis retained Rajamaki's NHL rights until trading them to Carolina on January 30.)	
January 23, 2006	Aaron Downey	Montreal Canadiens	Waivers	
January 28, 2006	Simon Gamache	Nashville Predators	Waivers	
February 3, 2006	Craig Anderson	Chicago Blackhawks	Waivers	
April 30, 2006	Reinhard Divis	EC Red Bull Salzburg (EBEL)	Free agency	

=== Signings ===
Date	Player	Term	Contract type	Ref
July 28, 2005	Patrick Lalime	1-year	Option exercised	
July 28, 2005	Andy Roach	1-year	Option exercised	
July 28, 2005	Matt Walker	1-year	Option exercised	
July 29, 2005	Zack Fitzgerald		Entry-level	
July 29, 2005	Lee Stempniak		Entry-level	
August 9, 2005	Eric Boguniecki		Re-signing	
August 9, 2005	Colin Hemingway		Re-signing	
August 9, 2005	Bryce Salvador		Re-signing	
August 11, 2005	Trevor Byrne		Re-signing	
August 11, 2005	Mike Glumac		Re-signing	
August 11, 2005	Ryan Johnson		Re-signing	
August 11, 2005	Mark Rycroft		Re-signing	
August 11, 2005	Mike Stuart		Re-signing	
August 15, 2005	Eric Brewer		Re-signing	
August 15, 2005	Jamal Mayers		Re-signing	
August 15, 2005	Brett Scheffelmaier		Re-signing	
August 15, 2005	Peter Sejna		Re-signing	
March 15, 2006	David Backes		Entry-level	
April 20, 2006	Keith Tkachuk	1-year	Option exercised	
April 25, 2006	Magnus Kahnberg		Entry-level	
May 31, 2006	Michal Birner		Entry-level	
May 31, 2006	Roman Polak		Entry-level	
May 31, 2006	Marek Schwarz		Entry-level	
May 31, 2006	Carl Soderberg		Entry-level	

== Draft picks ==
St. Louis's draft picks at the 2005 NHL entry draft held at the Westin Hotel in Ottawa, Ontario.

Round	#	Player	Nationality	College/Junior/Club team (League)
1	24	T. J. Oshie	United States	Warroad High School (USHS-MN)
2	37	Scott Jackson	Canada	Seattle Thunderbirds (WHL)
3	85	Ben Bishop	United States	Texas Tornado (NAHL)
5	156	Ryan Reaves	Canada	Brandon Wheat Kings (WHL)
6	169	Mike Gauthier	Canada	Prince Albert Raiders (WHL)
6	171	Nick Drazenovic	Canada	Prince George Cougars (WHL)
7	219	Nikolai Lemtyugov	Russia	CSKA Moscow (Russia)

== Farm teams ==
- Peoria Rivermen (AHL) - Peoria, Illinois Posted 46-26-0-8 Record, lost in 2nd round of playoffs
- Alaska Aces (ECHL) - Anchorage, Alaska Posted 53-12-0-7 Record, won Kelly Cup

== See also ==
- 2005–06 NHL season
