= Matt Ryan (ice hockey) =

Canadian ice hockey player

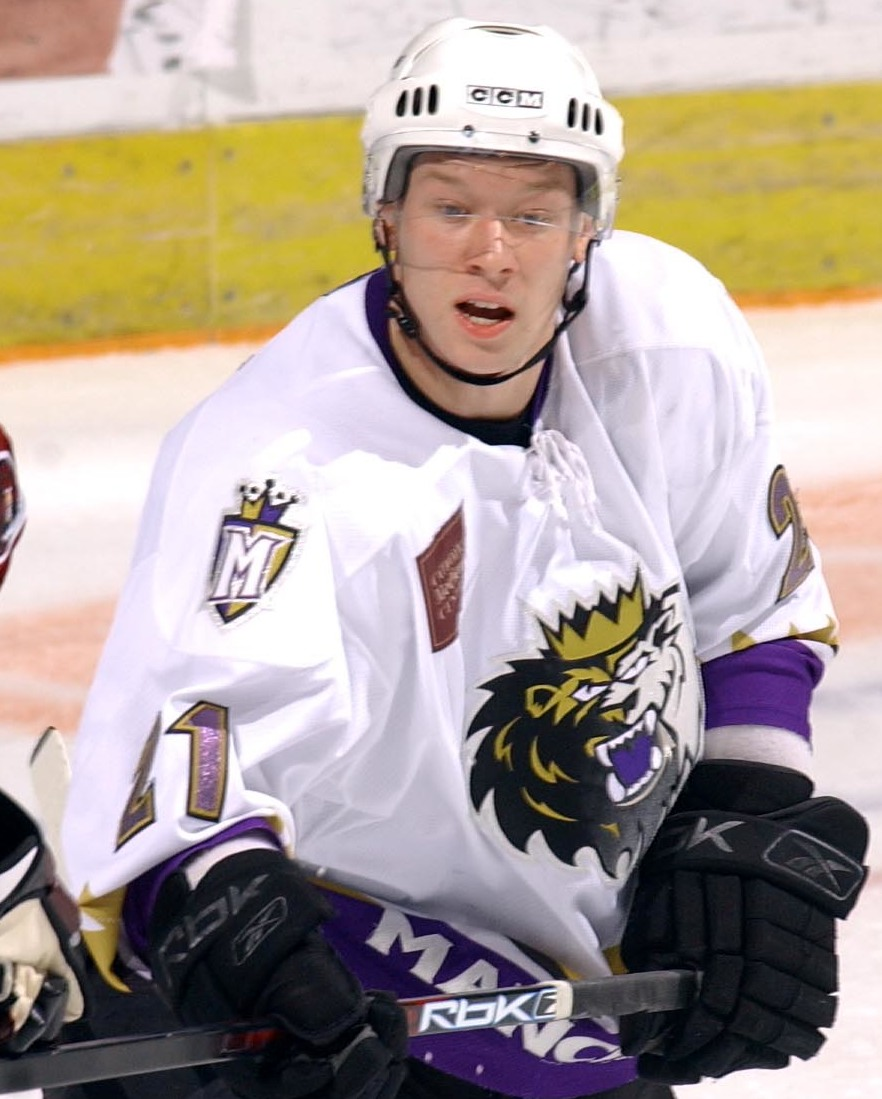
- Ryan with the Manchester Monarchs in 2007
- Born: November 12, 1983 (age 42) Sharon, Ontario, Canada
- Height: 5 ft 11 in (180 cm)
- Weight: 182 lb (83 kg; 13 st 0 lb)
- Position: Centre
- Shot: Right
- Played for: NHL; Los Angeles Kings; DEL; Augsburger Panther; EIHL; Nottingham Panthers; Dundee Stars
- NHL draft: Undrafted
- Playing career: 2004–2015

Matthew Ryan (born November 12, 1983) is a Canadian former professional ice hockey centre who played for several teams in Europe as well as the Los Angeles Kings of the NHL.

== Playing career ==
As a youth, Ryan played in the 1997 Quebec International Pee-Wee Hockey Tournament with a minor ice hockey team from Richmond Hill, Ontario.

Undrafted, Ryan played junior hockey with the Wexford Raiders of the OPJHL before committing to a collegiate career at Niagara University of the College Hockey America. After posting 19 points in his freshman year, he left in his following sophomore year for the higher level of competition in the Ontario Hockey League. In his second year with the Guelph Storm in 2003–04, he scored a career high 77 points on the way to reaching the Memorial Cup.

On August 2, 2004, Ryan was signed by the Los Angeles Kings to a three-year entry-level contract. In 2004–05, his first professional season, he scored 24 points with the Kings AHL affiliate, the Manchester Monarchs. He matched his offensive out with the Monarchs the following season and made his NHL debut with the Kings on December 31, 2005, against the Dallas Stars finishing 2005–06 with 12 games recording an assist.

Ryan played the next two seasons strictly with Manchester before signing a one-year contract with German team, Augsburger Panther of the Deutsche Eishockey Liga. During the 2008–09 season, his contract with the Panthers was suspended after he returned home to Canada for personal reasons on November 11, 2008. Ryan returned later in the season and became the Panthers most dependable role player and was re-signed for a further year on June 10, 2009.

On June 15, 2010, Ryan signed a one-year contract with Austrian league team, Villacher SV.

On July 16, 2012, Ryan signed with Italian team Hockey Milano Rossoblu. He moved to the EIHL for the 2013–14 season, playing with the Nottingham Panthers. There he posted 64 points in 68 games and helped the team win the EIHL Challenge Cup. In August 2014, Ryan switched teams, signing a two-year contract with the Dundee Stars in the EIHL. For the 2014–15 season, he both played on the Stars and served as an assistant coach.

== Career statistics ==
| | | | Regular season | | | | | Playoffs |
| Season | Team | League | GP | G | A | Pts | PIM | GP | G | A | Pts | PIM |
|---|---|---|---|---|---|---|---|---|---|---|---|---|
| 2000–01 | Wexford Raiders | OPJHL | 42 | 20 | 13 | 33 | 44 | — | — | — | — | — |
| 2001–02 | Niagara University | CHA | 32 | 7 | 12 | 19 | 32 | — | — | — | — | — |
| 2002–03 | Niagara University | CHA | 9 | 6 | 2 | 8 | 14 | — | — | — | — | — |
| 2002–03 | Guelph Storm | OHL | 48 | 14 | 11 | 25 | 34 | 11 | 2 | 7 | 9 | 0 |
| 2003–04 | Guelph Storm | OHL | 68 | 42 | 35 | 77 | 63 | 22 | 8 | 11 | 19 | 24 |
| 2004–05 | Manchester Monarchs | AHL | 77 | 9 | 15 | 24 | 59 | 6 | 0 | 1 | 1 | 4 |
| 2005–06 | Manchester Monarchs | AHL | 68 | 12 | 12 | 24 | 79 | 7 | 1 | 1 | 2 | 8 |
| 2005–06 | Los Angeles Kings | NHL | 12 | 0 | 1 | 1 | 2 | — | — | — | — | — |
| 2006–07 | Manchester Monarchs | AHL | 56 | 8 | 16 | 24 | 50 | 16 | 3 | 5 | 8 | 13 |
| 2007–08 | Manchester Monarchs | AHL | 65 | 8 | 6 | 14 | 74 | 4 | 0 | 1 | 1 | 2 |
| 2008–09 | Augsburger Panther | DEL | 25 | 11 | 7 | 18 | 57 | 4 | 2 | 1 | 3 | 8 |
| 2009–10 | Augsburger Panther | DEL | 54 | 13 | 25 | 38 | 64 | 9 | 0 | 1 | 1 | 6 |
| 2010–11 | Villacher SV | EBEL | 54 | 10 | 20 | 30 | 65 | 10 | 0 | 2 | 2 | 16 |
| 2011–12 | IK Oskarshamn | Swe.1 | 50 | 6 | 21 | 27 | 48 | 6 | 1 | 2 | 3 | 4 |
| 2012–13 | Milano Rossoblu | Serie A | 38 | 9 | 15 | 24 | 46 | — | — | — | — | — |
| 2013–14 | Nottingham Panthers | EIHL | 49 | 14 | 32 | 46 | 42 | — | — | — | — | — |
| 2014–15 | Dundee Stars | EIHL | 18 | 3 | 7 | 10 | 14 | — | — | — | — | — |
| NHL totals | | | 12 | 0 | 1 | 1 | 2 | — | — | — | — | — |
