= 2005–06 Detroit Red Wings season =

Detroit

2005–06 Detroit Red Wings
- Presidents' Trophy winners
- Central Division champions
- Division: 1st Central
- Conference: 1st Western
- 2005–06 record: 58–16–8
- Home record: 27–9–5
- Road record: 31–7–3
- Goals for: 305
- Goals against: 209

Team information
- General manager: Ken Holland
- Coach: Mike Babcock
- Captain: Steve Yzerman
- Alternate captains: Nicklas Lidstrom; Brendan Shanahan
- Arena: Joe Louis Arena
- Average attendance: 20,066 (100%)
- Minor league affiliates: Grand Rapids Griffins; Toledo Storm

Team leaders
- Goals: Brendan Shanahan (40)
- Assists: Nicklas Lidstrom (64)
- Points: Pavel Datsyuk (87)
- Penalty minutes: Chris Chelios (108)
- Plus/minus: Mathieu Schneider (33)
- Wins: Manny Legace (37)
- Goals against average: Manny Legace (2.19)

The 2005–06 Detroit Red Wings season was the 80th National Hockey League season in Detroit, Michigan. The Wings once again found themselves having the best regular season record, scoring 124 points for the second-highest point total in franchise history.

The Red Wings began the season with a conflict in goal as recent pickup Chris Osgood was injured in preseason activities and Manny Legace was to start in goal. Legace played great, winning 10 of his first 11 games, and quickly earned the starting goaltender job. The Red Wings decided to start Legace in the playoffs but his inexperience quickly showed and Detroit was knocked out in the first round by the Edmonton Oilers (who'd go on to win the conference) in six games.

Detroit defenseman, Jiri Fischer, suffered a cardiac arrest in the first period of a game against the Nashville Predators on November 21. The game was stopped and eventually called as many fans in Joe Louis Arena either could not see what was going on or looked on in horror. Fischer was given CPR on the Wings' bench and then carried out on a stretcher. Nashville had a 1–0 lead within the game and it was decided that the score would be added onto the rescheduled game later in the season.

The Red Wings sold out all 41 home games in 2005–06, as 20,066 fans packed Joe Louis Arena for every regular season and playoff game played in Detroit.

There was no All-Star Game this year as the Winter Olympics in Turin took place in February 2006, where nine Red Wings players represented their countries. Kris Draper represented Canada, Chris Chelios represented the United States, Robert Lang represented the Czech Republic, Pavel Datsyuk represented Russia, and Nicklas Lidstrom, Mikael Samuelsson, Henrik Zetterberg, Niklas Kronwall and Tomas Holmstrom represented Sweden. Team Canada Head Coach Wayne Gretzky told Steve Yzerman it was his decision as to whether he wanted to play in the 2006 Olympics. Citing his age and playing ability, Yzerman bowed out to give up his roster spot to a "more deserving player."

Sweden won the gold medal in ice hockey, as all three goals scored in the gold medal game were by Red Wing players. Red Wings head coach Mike Babcock decided to give the five gold medal winners from Detroit time to return to Sweden to celebrate. They only missed one game, February 28 against the San Jose Sharks. In that game, Detroit suffered their worst loss of the season, losing by four goals.

For the first time in 10 years, Detroit was not shut out in any of their 82 regular season games. Offensively, Detroit trailed only the Ottawa Senators in scoring and shots on goal, with 301 goals (305 including the four shootout-winning goals) and 2,796 shots, respectively. Furthermore, for the first time since the 1992–93 season, the Red Wings scored more than 100 power play goals during the regular season, this time with 102. Detroit had eight players on its roster that scored at least twenty goals each during the regular season.

Defensively, the Red Wings finished second in most shutouts for, with nine and allowed only 206 goals (209 including three shootout-winning goals), good enough for third overall.

== Regular season ==
The Red Wings finished the regular season with the League's best power-play percentage, at 22.13% (102 for 461).

=== Season standings ===
Central Division
No.	CR		GP	W	L	OTL	GF	GA	Pts
1	1	**Detroit Red Wings**	82	58	16	8	305	209	124
2	4	**Nashville Predators**	82	49	25	8	259	227	106
3	13	Columbus Blue Jackets	82	35	43	4	223	279	74
4	14	Chicago Blackhawks	82	26	43	13	211	285	65
5	15	St. Louis Blues	82	21	46	15	197	292	57

Note: CR = Conference rank; GP = Games played; W = Wins; L = Losses; T = Ties; OTL = Overtime loss; GF = Goals for; GA = Goals against; Pts = Points
Bolded teams qualified for the playoffs.

Western Conference
R		Div	GP	W	L	OTL	GF	GA	Pts
**1**	**P-** Detroit Red Wings	**CE**	**82**	**58**	**16**	**8**	**305**	**209**	124
**2**	**Y-** Dallas Stars	**PA**	**82**	**53**	**23**	**6**	**265**	**218**	112
**3**	**Y-** Calgary Flames	**NW**	**82**	**46**	**25**	**11**	**218**	**200**	103
**4**	**X-** Nashville Predators	**CE**	**82**	**49**	**25**	**8**	**259**	**227**	106
**5**	**X-** San Jose Sharks	**PA**	**82**	**44**	**27**	**11**	**266**	**242**	99
**6**	**X-** Mighty Ducks of Anaheim	**PA**	**82**	**43**	**27**	**12**	**254**	**229**	98
**7**	**X-** Colorado Avalanche	**NW**	**82**	**43**	**30**	**9**	**283**	**257**	95
**8**	**X-** Edmonton Oilers	**NW**	**82**	**41**	**28**	**13**	**256**	**251**	95
8.5
9	Vancouver Canucks	NW	82	42	32	8	256	255	92
10	Los Angeles Kings	PA	82	42	35	5	249	270	89
11	Minnesota Wild	NW	82	38	36	8	231	215	84
12	Phoenix Coyotes	PA	82	38	39	5	246	271	81
13	Columbus Blue Jackets	CE	82	35	43	4	223	279	74
14	Chicago Blackhawks	CE	82	26	43	13	211	285	65
15	St. Louis Blues	CE	82	21	46	15	197	292	57

Divisions: CE – Central, PA – Pacific, NW – Northwest

P – Clinched Presidents Trophy; Y – Clinched division; X – Clinched playoff spot

For complete final standings, see 2005–06 NHL season

== Playoffs ==
The Detroit Red Wings ended the 2005–06 regular season as the Western Conference's first seed and played Edmonton in the first round. Edmonton would go on to defeat Detroit and reach the Stanley Cup Finals, losing in Game 7 to the Carolina Hurricanes.

== Schedule and results ==
=== Regular season ===
2005–06 regular season
October: 11–1–0 (home: 5–1–0; road: 6–0–0)

Game	Date	Visitor	Score	Home	OT	Decision	Attendance	Record	Pts	Recap
1	October 5	St. Louis	1 – 5	Detroit		Legace	20,066	1–0–0	2	W
2	October 6	Detroit	4 – 3	St. Louis		Legace	15,318	2–0–0	4	W
3	October 9	Calgary	3 – 6	Detroit		Legace	20,066	3–0–0	6	W
4	October 10	Vancouver	4 – 2	Detroit		Legace	20,066	3–1–0	6	L
5	October 13	Detroit	5 – 2	Los Angeles		Legace	18,118	4–1–0	8	W
6	October 15	Detroit	2 – 0	Phoenix		Legace	17,799	5–1–0	10	W
7	October 17	San Jose	2 – 3	Detroit	OT	Legace	20,066	6–1–0	12	W
8	October 21	Anaheim	2 – 3	Detroit		Legace	20,066	7–1–0	14	W
9	October 22	Detroit	6 – 0	Columbus		Legace	18,136	8–1–0	16	W
10	October 24	Detroit	6 – 2	Columbus		Legace	16,098	9–1–0	18	W
11	October 27	Chicago	2 – 5	Detroit		Legace	20,066	10–1–0	20	W
12	October 29	Detroit	4 – 2	Chicago		Osgood	20,658	11–1–0	22	W

November: 7–5–2 (home: 4–2–1; road: 3–3–1)

Game	Date	Visitor	Score	Home	OT	Decision	Attendance	Record	Pts	Recap
13	November 1	Chicago	1 – 4	Detroit		Osgood	20,066	12–1–0	24	W
14	November 3	Edmonton	4 – 3	Detroit	OT	Osgood	20,066	12–1–1	25	OTL
15	November 5	Phoenix	4 – 1	Detroit		Osgood	20,066	12–2–1	25	L
16	November 6	Detroit	4 – 1	St. Louis		Osgood	13,211	13–2–1	27	W
17	November 9	Los Angeles	5 – 4	Detroit	OT	Legace	20,066	14–2–1	29	W
18	November 11	Minnesota	1 – 3	Detroit		Legace	20,066	15–2–1	31	W
19	November 13	Detroit	1 – 4	Vancouver		Legace	18,630	15–3–1	31	L
20	November 16	Detroit	1 – 3	Calgary		Legace	19,289	15–4–1	31	L
21	November 17	Detroit	5 – 6	Edmonton	OT	Osgood	20,066	15–4–2	32	OTL
22	November 19	St. Louis	3 – 2	Detroit		Legace	20,066	15–5–2	32	L
	November 21	Nashville	PPD^{[a]}	Detroit		Legace	20,066			
23	November 23	Colorado	3 – 7	Detroit		Legace	20,066	16–5–2	34	W
24	November 25	Detroit	1 – 3	Anaheim		Osgood	17,174	16–6–2	34	L
25	November 26	Detroit	7 – 6	San Jose		Osgood	17,496	17–6–2	36	W
26	November 28	Detroit	5 – 2	Los Angeles		Howard	18,118	18–6–2	38	W
Notes:^{a} Game was cancelled with 7:31 left in the first period after Jiri Fischer suffered heart failure on the bench. Nashville was ahead 1–0 and the score would be added to a January 23 rescheduled game. Fischer was tended to and would soon after retire due to an enlarged heart and complications resulting thereof.

December: 8–3–1 (home: 4–2–0; road: 4–1–1)

Game	Date	Visitor	Score	Home	OT	Decision	Attendance	Record	Pts	Recap
27	December 1	Calgary	3 – 2	Detroit		Howard	20,066	18–7–2	38	L
28	December 4	NY Islanders	2 – 1	Detroit		Howard	20,066	18–8–2	38	L
29	December 6	New Jersey	2 – 5	Detroit		Osgood	20,066	19–8–2	40	W
30	December 9	Detroit	4 – 3	Washington		Osgood	18,277	20–8–2	42	W
31	December 12	Pittsburgh	1 – 3	Detroit		Osgood	20,066	21–8–2	44	W
32	December 13	Detroit	6 – 7	Atlanta		Osgood	17,559	21–9–2	44	L
33	December 15	Detroit	2 – 3	Florida	OT	Osgood	17,716	21–9–3	45	OTL
34	December 17	Detroit	6 – 3	Tampa Bay		Osgood	21,204	22–9–3	47	W
35	December 20	Columbus	3 – 4	Detroit	SO	Osgood	20,066	23–9–3	49	W
36	December 23	Detroit	3 – 2	Chicago	OT	Osgood	20,543	24–9–3	51	W
37	December 27	Detroit	4 – 1	Dallas		Osgood	18,584	25–9–3	53	W
38	December 31	Columbus	2 – 3	Detroit	OT	Osgood	20,066	26–9–3	55	W

January: 8–4–2 (home: 4–3–1; road: 4–1–1)

Game	Date	Visitor	Score	Home	OT	Decision	Attendance	Record	Pts	Recap
39	January 3	Minnesota	4 – 2	Detroit		Osgood	20,066	26–10–3	55	L
40	January 5	St. Louis	0 – 3	Detroit		Legace	20,066	27–10–3	57	W
41	January 6	Detroit	3 – 1	Nashville		Legace	17,113	28–10–3	59	W
42	January 8	Dallas	6 – 3	Detroit		Osgood	20,066	28–11–3	59	L
43	January 10	Detroit	2 – 3	Carolina		Legace	18,730	28–12–3	59	L
44	January 12	Philadelphia	3 – 6	Detroit		Legace	20,066	29–12–3	61	W
45	January 14	NY Rangers	3 – 4	Detroit		Legace	20,066	30–12–3	63	W
46	January 18	Detroit	4 – 0	Columbus		Osgood	17,089	31–12–3	65	W
47	January 21	Detroit	4 – 3	Colorado		Legace	18,007	32–12–3	67	W
48	January 23^{[b]}	Nashville	3 – 2	Detroit		Legace	20,066	32–13–3	67	L
49	January 24	Nashville	2 – 1	Detroit	OT	Legace	20,066	32–13–4	67	OTL
50	January 26	Vancouver	1 – 2	Detroit		Legace	20,066	33–13–4	69	W
51	January 28	Detroit	1 – 2	Dallas	SO	Legace	18,584	33–13–5	71	OTL
52	January 30	Detroit	5 – 4	Minnesota		Legace	18,568	34–13–5	73	W
Notes:^{b} Makeup date for the November 21st game that was postponed. Nashville started the game with a 1–0 lead.

February: 5–1–0 (home: 3–0–0; road: 2–1–0)

Game	Date	Visitor	Score	Home	OT	Decision	Attendance	Record	Pts	Recap
53	February 1	St. Louis	2 – 3	Detroit		Legace	20,066	35–13–5	75	W
54	February 4	Detroit	3 – 0	Colorado		Legace	18,007	36–13–5	77	W
55	February 8	Nashville	0 – 6	Detroit		Legace	20,066	37–13–5	79	W
56	February 9	Detroit	3 – 2	Nashville		Legace	17,113	38–13–5	81	W
57	February 12	Colorado	3 – 6	Detroit		Legace	20,066	39–13–5	83	W
58	February 28	Detroit	1 – 5	San Jose		Legace	17,496	39–14–5	83	L

March: 11–1–3 (home: 4–1–3; road: 7–0–0)

Game	Date	Visitor	Score	Home	OT	Decision	Attendance	Record	Pts	Recap
59	March 1	Detroit	2 – 0	Anaheim		Osgood	16,606	40–14–5	85	W
60	March 4	Detroit	7 – 3	Phoenix		Legace	18,619	41–14–5	87	W
61	March 7	Phoenix	5 – 2	Detroit		Legace	20,066	41–15–5	89	L
62	March 9	Los Angeles	3 – 7	Detroit		Legace	20,066	42–15–5	89	W
63	March 11	Chicago	4 – 6	Detroit		Legace	20,066	43–15–5	91	W
64	March 12	Detroit	5 – 3	Chicago		Osgood	19,136	44–15–5	93	W
65	March 15	Anaheim	1 – 3	Detroit		Osgood	20,066	45–15–5	95	W
66	March 18	Detroit	4 – 3	Edmonton	SO	Legace	16,839	46–15–5	97	W
67	March 19	Detroit	7 – 3	Vancouver		Osgood	18,630	47–15–5	99	W
68	March 21	Nashville	3 – 2	Detroit	SO	Legace	20,066	47–15–6	100	OTL
69	March 23	San Jose	0 – 4	Detroit		Legace	20,066	48–15–6	102	W
70	March 25	Columbus	5 – 4	Detroit	SO	Osgood	20,066	48–15–7	103	OTL
71	March 27	Detroit	4 – 1	St. Louis		Legace	12,834	49–15–7	105	W
72	March 30	Detroit	4 – 2	Nashville		Legace	16,570	50–15–7	107	W
73	March 31	Chicago	3 – 2	Detroit	OT	Osgood	20,066	50–15–8	108	OTL

April: 8–1–0 (home: 3–0–0; road: 5–1–0)

Game	Date	Visitor	Score	Home	OT	Decision	Attendance	Record	Pts	Recap
74	April 2	Detroit	3 – 2	Minnesota		Legace	18,568	51–15–8	110	W
75	April 3	Detroit	2 – 1	Calgary	SO	Osgood	19,289	52–15–8	112	W
76	April 7	Columbus	6 – 5	Detroit	SO	Legace	20,066	53–15–8	114	W
77	April 8	Detroit	4 – 2	Columbus		Osgood	18,136	54–15–8	116	W
78	April 11	Edmonton	0 – 2	Detroit		Legace	20,066	55–15–8	118	W
79	April 13	Detroit	7 – 3	Chicago		Legace	15,117	56–15–8	120	W
80	April 15	Detroit	3 – 2	St. Louis		Osgood	16,094	57–15–8	122	W
81	April 17	Dallas	2 – 3	Detroit		Legace	20,066	58–15–8	124	W
82	April 18	Detroit	3 – 6	Nashville		Osgood	17,113	58–16–8	124	L

Legend: W Win (2 points) L Loss (0 points) OTL Overtime/shootout loss (1 point)

=== Playoffs ===
2006 Stanley Cup playoffs
Western Conference Quarterfinals: vs. (8) Edmonton Oilers — Edmonton wins 4–2

Game	Date	Visitor	Score	Home	OT	Decision	Attendance	Series	Recap
1	April 21	Edmonton	2 – 3	Detroit	2OT	Legace	20,066	Red Wings lead 1–0	W
2	April 23	Edmonton	4 – 2	Detroit		Legace	20,066	Series tied 1–1	L
3	April 25	Detroit	3 – 4	Edmonton	2OT	Legace	16,839	Oilers lead 2–1	L
4	April 27	Detroit	4 – 2	Edmonton		Legace	16,839	Series tied 2–2	W
5	April 29	Edmonton	3 – 2	Detroit		Legace	20,066	Oilers lead 3–2	L
6	May 1	Detroit	3 – 4	Edmonton		Legace	16,839	Oilers win 4–2	L

Legend: W Win L Loss

== Player statistics ==
=== Scoring ===
- Position abbreviations: C = Center; D = Defense; G = Goaltender; LW = Left wing; RW = Right wing
- † = Joined team via a transaction (e.g., trade, waivers, signing) during the season. Stats reflect time with the Red Wings only.
- ‡ = Left team via a transaction (e.g., trade, waivers, release) during the season. Stats reflect time with the Red Wings only.

No.	Player	Pos	Regular season						Playoffs					
No.	Player	Pos	GP	G	A	Pts	+/-	PIM	GP	G	A	Pts	+/-	PIM
13	Pavel Datsyuk	C	75	28	59	87	26	22	5	0	3	3	0	0
40	Henrik Zetterberg	LW	77	39	46	85	29	30	6	6	0	6	−2	2
14	Brendan Shanahan	LW	82	40	41	81	29	105	6	1	1	2	0	6
5	Nicklas Lidstrom	D	80	16	64	80	21	50	6	1	1	2	−4	2
20	Robert Lang	C	72	20	42	62	17	72	6	3	3	6	−2	2
96	Tomas Holmstrom	LW	81	29	30	59	14	66	6	1	2	3	−1	12
23	Mathieu Schneider	D	72	21	38	59	33	86	6	1	7	8	−1	6
29	Jason Williams	C	80	21	37	58	4	26	6	1	1	2	−3	6
37	Mikael Samuelsson	RW	71	23	22	45	27	42	6	0	1	1	−1	6
19	Steve Yzerman	C	61	14	20	34	8	18	4	0	4	4	−2	4
33	Kris Draper	C	80	10	22	32	3	58	6	0	0	0	3	6
15	Jason Woolley	D	53	1	18	19	3	28	—	—	—	—	—	—
39	Johan Franzen	C	80	12	4	16	4	36	6	1	2	3	0	4
44	Mark Mowers	RW	46	4	11	15	13	16	6	0	0	0	0	0
11	Daniel Cleary	RW	77	3	12	15	5	40	6	0	1	1	2	6
3	Andreas Lilja	D	82	2	13	15	18	98	6	0	1	1	−4	6
22	Brett Lebda	D	46	3	9	12	9	20	6	0	0	0	3	4
18	Kirk Maltby	LW	82	5	6	11	−9	80	6	2	1	3	2	4
24	Chris Chelios	D	81	4	7	11	22	108	6	0	0	0	2	6
55	Niklas Kronwall	D	27	1	8	9	11	28	6	0	3	3	0	2
2	Jiri Fischer	D	22	3	5	8	8	33	—	—	—	—	—	—
4	Cory Cross†	D	16	1	1	2	3	15	—	—	—	—	—	—
42	Donald MacLean	C	1	1	1	2	2	0	—	—	—	—	—	—
41	Valtteri Filppula	C	4	0	1	1	1	2	—	—	—	—	—	—
34	Manny Legace	G	51	0	1	1		0	6	0	0	0		0
4	Jamie Rivers‡	D	15	0	1	1	0	12	—	—	—	—	—	—
35	Jimmy Howard	G	4	0	0	0		0	—	—	—	—	—	—
26	Jiri Hudler	C	4	0	0	0	0	2	—	—	—	—	—	—
32	Tomas Kopecky	RW	1	0	0	0	1	2	—	—	—	—	—	—
30	Chris Osgood	G	32	0	0	0		8	—	—	—	—	—	—
45	Kyle Quincey	D	1	0	0	0	0	0	—	—	—	—	—	—

=== Goaltending ===
No.	Player	Regular season										Playoffs								
No.	Player	GP	W	L	OT	SA	GA	GAA	SV%	SO	TOI	GP	W	L	SA	GA	GAA	SV%	SO	TOI
34	Manny Legace	51	37	8	3	1244	106	2.19	.915	7	2905	6	2	4	155	18	.884	2.65	0	1029
30	Chris Osgood	32	20	6	5	828	85	2.79	.897	2	1846	—	—	—	—	—	—	—	—	—
35	Jimmy Howard	4	1	2	0	104	10	2.99	.904	0	201	—	—	—	—	—	—	—	—	—

== Awards and records ==
=== Awards ===
Type	Award/honor	Recipient	Ref
League (annual)	James Norris Memorial Trophy	Nicklas Lidstrom	
League (annual)	Lady Byng Memorial Trophy	Pavel Datsyuk	
League (annual)	Lester Patrick Trophy	Steve Yzerman	
League (annual)	NHL First All-Star Team	Nicklas Lidstrom (Defense)	
League (in-season)	NHL Defensive Player of the Month	Manny Legace (October)	
League (in-season)	NHL Defensive Player of the Week	Manny Legace (October 24)	
League (in-season)	NHL Defensive Player of the Week	Manny Legace (February 13)	
League (in-season)	NHL Offensive Player of the Week	Brendan Shanahan (December 19)	

=== Milestones ===
Milestone	Player	Date	Ref
First game	Johan Franzen	October 5, 2005	
First game	Brett Lebda	October 5, 2005	
First game	Kyle Quincey	November 25, 2005	
First game	Jimmy Howard	November 28, 2005	
First game	Valtteri Filppula	December 15, 2005	
First game	Tomas Kopecky	February 28, 2006	
1,000th game played	Mathieu Schneider	October 21, 2005	
600th assist	Brendan Shanahan	November 9, 2005	
600th assist	Nicklas Lidstrom	March 7, 2006	

== Transactions ==
The Red Wings were involved in the following transactions from February 17, 2005, the day after the 2004–05 NHL season was officially cancelled, through June 19, 2006, the day of the deciding game of the 2006 Stanley Cup Finals.

=== Trades ===
Date	Details		Ref
March 9, 2006	To Phoenix Coyotes: Jamie Rivers	To Detroit Red Wings: 7th-round pick in 2006	
March 9, 2006	To Pittsburgh Penguins: 4th-round pick in 2007	To Detroit Red Wings: Cory Cross	

=== Players acquired ===
Date	Player	Former team	Term	Via	Ref
August 8, 2005	Chris Osgood	St. Louis Blues	1-year	Free agency	
August 12, 2005	Kent McDonell	Columbus Blue Jackets	1-year	Free agency	
August 16, 2005	Andy Delmore	Adler Mannheim (DEL)	1-year	Free agency	
August 16, 2005	Michael Hackert	Frankfurt Lions (DEL)		Free agency	
August 25, 2005	Andreas Lilja	Nashville Predators	1-year	Free agency	
August 25, 2005	Don MacLean	Espoo Blues (Liiga)	1-year	Free agency	
September 18, 2005	Mikael Samuelsson	Sodertalje SK (SHL)	1-year	Free agency	
October 4, 2005	Daniel Cleary	Phoenix Coyotes	1-year	Free agency	

=== Players lost ===
Date	Player	New team	Via (Note: In parentheses is the player's free agency group on August 1 if applicable.)	Ref
July 26, 2005	Derian Hatcher	Philadelphia Flyers (Note: Hatcher signed with Philadelphia on August 2.)	Compliance buyout	
July 26, 2005	Darren McCarty	Calgary Flames (Note: McCarty signed with Calgary on August 2.)	Compliance buyout	
July 26, 2005	Ray Whitney	Carolina Hurricanes (Note: Whitney signed with Carolina on August 6.)	Compliance buyout	
August 2, 2005	Pete Vandermeer	Montreal Canadiens	Free agency (VI)	
August 3, 2005	Mathieu Dandenault	Montreal Canadiens	Free agency (V)	
August 10, 2005	Paul Ballantyne	Phoenix Roadrunners (ECHL)	Free agency (UFA)	
August 15, 2005	Nathan Robinson	Boston Bruins	Free agency (UFA)	
August 17, 2005	Curtis Joseph	Phoenix Coyotes	Free agency (III)	
August 25, 2005	Danny Groulx	Kassel Huskies (DEL)	Free agency (UFA)	
October 4, 2005	Andy Delmore	Columbus Blue Jackets	Waivers	
December 9, 2005	Michael Hackert	Frankfurt Lions (DEL)	Free agency	

=== Signings ===
Date	Player	Term	Contract type	Ref
July 28, 2005	Brendan Shanahan	1-year	Option exercised	
July 29, 2005	Ryan Oulahen	3-year	Entry-level	
July 29, 2005	Kyle Quincey	3-year	Entry-level	
August 2, 2005	Steve Yzerman	1-year	Re-signing	
August 4, 2005	Chris Chelios	1-year	Re-signing	
August 4, 2005	Johan Franzen	1-year	Entry-level	
August 4, 2005	Mathieu Schneider	2-year	Re-signing	
August 11, 2005	Tomas Kopecky	1-year	Re-signing	
August 16, 2005	Darryl Bootland	1-year	Re-signing	
August 16, 2005	Jason Williams	1-year	Re-signing	
August 19, 2005	Valtteri Filppula	3-year	Entry-level	
August 24, 2005	Matt Ellis	2-year	Re-signing	
August 25, 2005	Jimmy Howard	3-year	Entry-level	
August 27, 2005	Niklas Kronwall	2-year	Re-signing	
September 7, 2005	Henrik Zetterberg	4-year	Re-signing	
September 26, 2005	Pavel Datsyuk	2-year	Re-signing	
October 8, 2005	Jason Woolley	1-year	Re-signing	
March 25, 2006	Mikael Samuelsson	3-year	Extension	
April 18, 2006	Andreas Lilja	2-year	Extension	
May 31, 2006	Chris Chelios	1-year	Re-signing	
May 31, 2006	Jonathan Ericsson	2-year	Entry-level	
May 31, 2006	Stefan Liv	1-year	Entry-level	
May 31, 2006	Evan McGrath	3-year	Entry-level	

== Draft picks ==
As there was no 2004–05 season to set the order for the draft, a lottery was held in which teams were assigned a number of balls, between one and three, based on the number of playoff appearances the team had had in the past three seasons. As the Red Wings had made the playoffs three consecutive seasons, they were given only one ball in the lottery. The Red Wings ended up with the 19th overall pick.

Detroit's picks at the 2005 NHL entry draft in Ottawa, Ontario:

Round	#	Player	Nationality	College/Junior/Club team (League)
1	19	Jakub Kindl (D)	Czech Republic	Kitchener Rangers (OHL)
2	42	Justin Abdelkader (LW)	United States	Cedar Rapids RoughRiders (USHL)
3	80	Christofer Lofberg (C)	Sweden	Djurgardens IF
4	103	Mattias Ritola (C/W)	Sweden	Leksands IF Jr. (Sweden)
5	132	Darren Helm (LW)	Canada	Medicine Hat Tigers (WHL)
5	137	Johan Ryno (RW)	Sweden	Kumla Jr. (Sweden Jr.)
5	151	Jeff May	Canada	Prince Albert Raiders (WHL)
6	175	Juho Mielonen	Finland	Ilves (Finland Jr.)
7	214	Bretton Stamler	Canada	Seattle Thunderbirds (WHL)

== Farm teams ==
=== Grand Rapids Griffins ===
The Griffins were Detroit's top affiliate in the American Hockey League in 2005–06.

=== Toledo Storm ===
The Storm were the Red Wings' ECHL affiliate for the 2005–06 season.

== See also ==
- 2005–06 NHL season
