= Michael Holmqvist =

Swedish ice hockey player (born 1979)

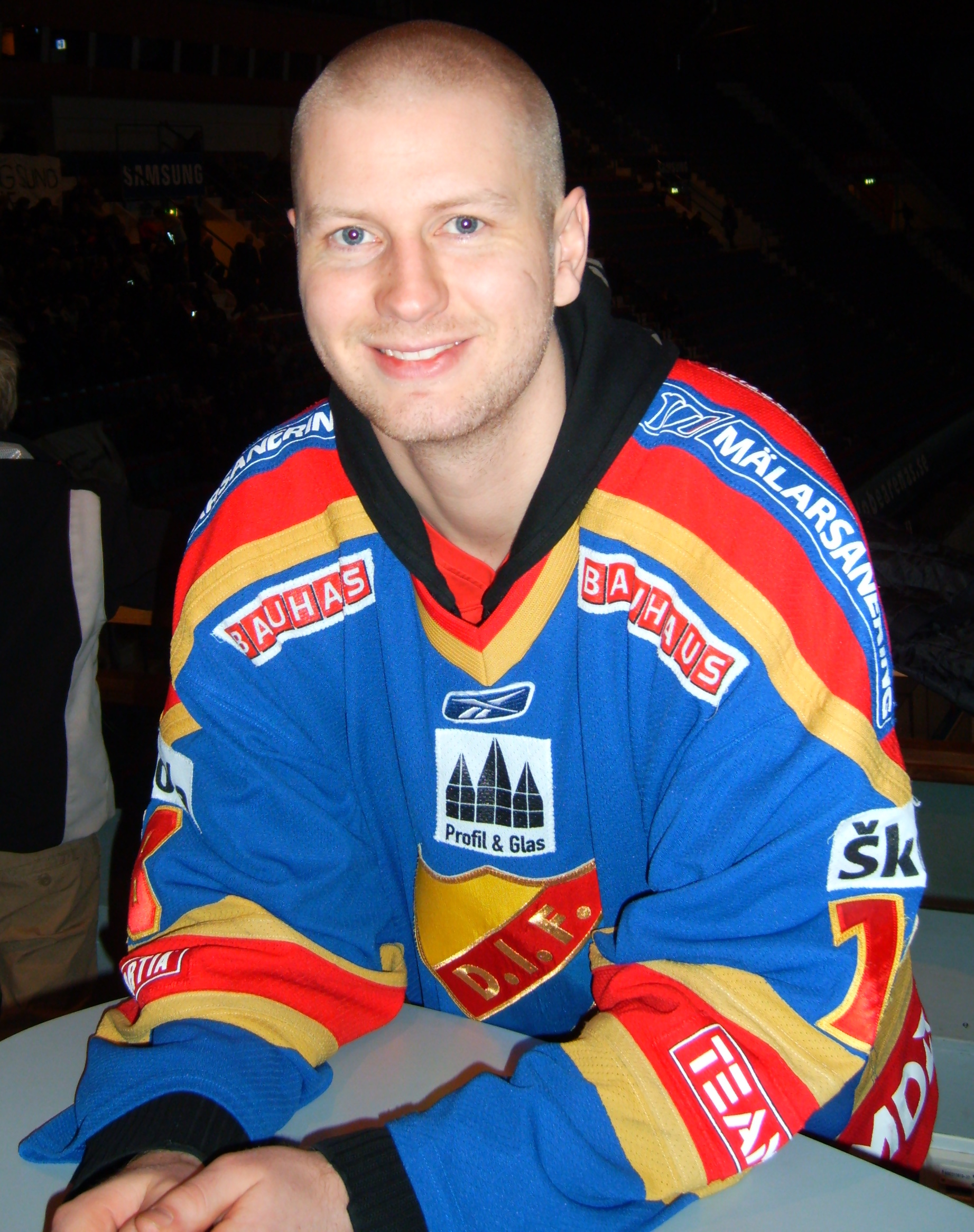
- Born: June 8, 1979 (age 47) Stockholm, Sweden
- Height: 6 ft 3 in (191 cm)
- Weight: 207 lb (94 kg; 14 st 11 lb)
- Position: Centre
- Shot: Left
- Played for: Färjestads BK; TPS (SM-liiga); Mighty Ducks of Anaheim; Chicago Blackhawks; Frölunda HC; Djurgårdens IF; Linköpings HC
- National team: Sweden
- NHL draft: 18th overall, 1997; Mighty Ducks of Anaheim
- Playing career: 1996–2015

Rolf Anders Michael Holmqvist Pedersen (born June 8, 1979) is a Swedish former professional ice hockey forward. He is the older brother of Djurgårdens IF player Andreas Holmqvist.

== Playing career ==
Holmqvist was drafted 18th overall by the Mighty Ducks of Anaheim in the 1997 NHL entry draft from the SEL. After moving to the SM-liiga with TPS in 1999, Holmqvist made it to North America to start the 2003–04 season.

Michael only managed to play 21 games for the Ducks during the season, splitting time with affiliate, the Cincinnati Mighty Ducks of the American Hockey League. On July 30, 2005, Holmqvist was traded by the Ducks to the Chicago Blackhawks for Travis Moen. In the 2005–06 season, Michael enjoyed his best year, recording 10 goals and 20 points in 72 games played. Holmqvist played two full seasons with the Blackhawks before returning to the SEL in 2007. In total, Holmqvist played 156 regular season games, scoring 18 goals and 17 assists for 35 points while collecting 72 penalty minutes.

== Career statistics ==
=== Regular season and playoffs ===
			Regular season					Playoffs
Season	Team	League	GP	G	A	Pts	PIM	GP	G	A	Pts	PIM
1995–96	Djurgårdens IF	J20	24	7	2	9	4	—	—	—	—	—
1996–97	Djurgårdens IF	J20	39	29	35	64	110	—	—	—	—	—
1996–97	Djurgårdens IF	SEL	9	0	0	0	0	—	—	—	—	—
1997–98	Färjestads BK	SEL	41	2	3	5	6	7	0	0	0	0
1998–99	Färjestads BK	J20	11	9	7	16	31	—	—	—	—	—
1998–99	Färjestads BK	SEL	15	0	0	0	6	—	—	—	—	—
1998–99	Hammarby IF	SWE.2	3	2	0	2	0	—	—	—	—	—
1999–2000	TPS	SM-l	54	12	3	15	14	11	2	3	5	4
2000–01	TPS	SM-l	46	4	5	9	8	10	1	3	4	2
2001–02	TPS	SM-l	56	9	13	22	16	8	1	0	1	12
2002–03	TPS	SM-l	56	15	25	40	36	7	0	0	0	4
2003–04	Mighty Ducks of Anaheim	NHL	21	2	0	2	25	—	—	—	—	—
2003–04	Cincinnati Mighty Ducks	AHL	24	7	7	14	20	—	—	—	—	—
2004–05	Cincinnati Mighty Ducks	AHL	79	14	32	46	111	11	2	2	4	10
2005–06	Chicago Blackhawks	NHL	72	10	10	20	16	—	—	—	—	—
2006–07	Chicago Blackhawks	NHL	63	6	7	13	31	—	—	—	—	—
2007–08	Frölunda HC	SEL	53	7	10	17	51	4	0	0	0	2
2008–09	Djurgårdens IF	SEL	53	9	10	19	78	—	—	—	—	—
2009–10	Djurgårdens IF	SEL	52	9	9	18	20	9	0	2	2	2
2010–11	Linköpings HC	SEL	51	5	5	10	39	7	2	5	7	2
2011–12	Linköpings HC	SEL	48	0	2	2	22	—	—	—	—	—
2012–13	Djurgårdens IF	Allsv	49	8	9	17	69	6	1	1	2	4
2013–14	Djurgårdens IF	Allsv	50	15	9	24	28	10	6	2	8	4
2014–15	Djurgårdens IF	SHL	43	3	6	9	14	—	—	—	—	—
SEL/SHL totals			365	35	45	80	236	27	2	7	9	6
SM-l totals			212	40	46	86	74	36	4	6	10	22
NHL totals			156	18	17	35	72	—	—	—	—	—

=== International ===
Year	Team	Event	GP	G	A	Pts	PIM
1997	Sweden	EJC	6	1	3	4	6
1998	Sweden	WJC	7	0	1	1	28
2008	Sweden	WC	7	0	0	0	6
Junior totals			13	1	4	5	34
Senior totals			7	0	0	0	6

Preceded by Ruslan Salei	Anaheim Ducks first-round draft pick 1997	Succeeded by Vitaly Vishnevski
