= Louis Robitaille (ice hockey) =

Canadian ice hockey player

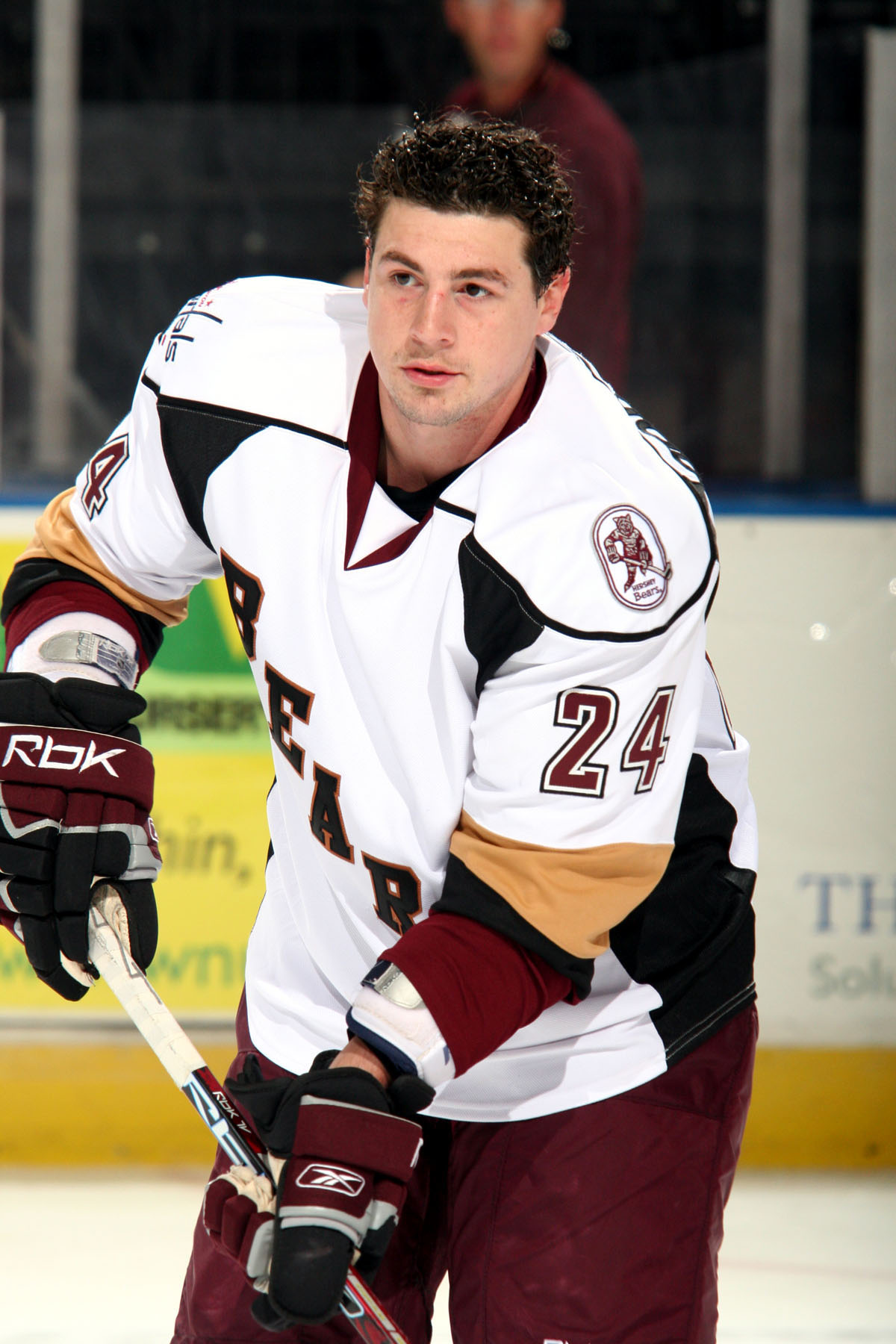
- Robitaille with the Hershey Bears in 2007
- Born: March 16, 1982 (age 44) Montreal, Quebec, Canada
- Height: 6 ft 2 in (188 cm)
- Weight: 215 lb (98 kg; 15 st 5 lb)
- Position: Left wing
- Shot: Left
- Played for: Washington Capitals; SG Cortina
- NHL draft: Undrafted
- Playing career: 2003–2012

Louis Robitaille (born March 16, 1982) is a Canadian former professional ice hockey forward and current assistant coach for the Hershey Bears of the AHL. He was formerly a head coach for the Russian Hockey Team Omskie Krylia of the VHL. He played 2 games in the National Hockey League with the Washington Capitals during the 2005–06 season. The rest of his career, which lasted from 2003 to 2012, was mainly spent in the minor leagues. He is the former coach of the Cape Breton Eagles

== Playing career ==
As a youth, Robitaille played in the 1996 Quebec International Pee-Wee Hockey Tournament with a minor ice hockey team from Châteauguay, Quebec.

While playing junior ice hockey, he took classes part-time at McGill University, majoring in French Literature.

Signed as a free agent in 2003 by the Washington Capitals, Robitaille played on the 2005–06 Calder Cup-winning Hershey Bears.

Robitaille made his debut with the Bears on Oct. 8, 2005 against the Wilkes-Barre/Scranton Penguins. He scored his first goal for Hershey on Nov. 19, 2005 against Philadelphia and picked up a game-winning goal Nov. 25, 2005 at Norfolk.

On August 28, 2008, Robitaille signed to play in Cortina, Italy, with the Cortina SG for 2008–09. However, on Dec. 9, 2008, Robitaille left the team due to family issues and returned to Canada to play for Saint-Hyacinthe Chiefs in the LNAH.

Robitaille returned to the AHL to play for the Lowell Devils for the 2009–10 season, and stayed with the team when it moved to Albany for 2010–11. After leading the Devils again in penalty minutes he then announced his retirement to become head coach of the QJAAAHL's Valleyfield Braves, a Junior AAA team based in Quebec.

== Career statistics ==
=== Regular season and playoffs ===
			Regular season					Playoffs
Season	Team	League	GP	G	A	Pts	PIM	GP	G	A	Pts	PIM
1998–99	Gatineau L'Intrépide	QMAAA	42	7	15	22	94	—	—	—	—	—
1999–00	Montreal Rocket	QMJHL	71	3	21	21	266	5	1	1	2	18
2000–01	Montreal Rocket	QMJHL	69	2	10	12	269	—	—	—	—	—
2001–02	Montreal Rocket	QMJHL	71	3	28	31	294	7	3	0	3	41
2002–03	Montreal Rocket	QMJHL	60	7	23	30	191	7	0	10	10	12
2003–04	Quad City Mallards	UHL	2	0	1	1	10	—	—	—	—	—
2003–04	Portland Pirates	AHL	58	1	5	6	103	5	1	0	1	17
2004–05	Portland Pirates	AHL	59	2	3	5	186	—	—	—	—	—
2005–06	Washington Capitals	NHL	2	0	0	0	5	—	—	—	—	—
2005–06	Hershey Bears	AHL	65	7	12	19	334	21	0	2	2	64
2006–07	Hershey Bears	AHL	67	6	8	14	254	13	0	1	1	30
2007–08	Hershey Bears	AHL	68	4	8	12	350	5	0	0	0	30
2008–09	Cortina SG	ITA	16	0	12	12	103	—	—	—	—	—
2008–09	Chiefs de Saint-Hyacinthe	LNAH	19	0	8	8	137	—	—	—	—	—
2009–10	Lowell Devils	AHL	73	2	11	13	286	5	0	0	0	22
2010–11	Albany Devils	AHL	50	2	6	8	246	—	—	—	—	—
2011–12	Marquis de Saguenay	LNAH	2	1	0	1	6	—	—	—	—	—
AHL totals			440	24	53	77	1759	49	1	3	4	163
NHL totals			2	0	0	0	5	—	—	—	—	—
