= 2005–06 Mighty Ducks of Anaheim season =

NHL team season

2005–06 Mighty Ducks of Anaheim
- Division: 3rd Pacific
- Conference: 6th Western
- 2005–06 record: 43–27–12
- Home record: 26–10–5
- Road record: 17–17–7
- Goals for: 254
- Goals against: 229

Team information
- General manager: Brian Burke
- Coach: Randy Carlyle
- Captain: Scott Niedermayer
- Alternate captains: Keith Carney (Nov.–Mar.); Sergei Fedorov (Oct.–Nov.); Rob Niedermayer; Teemu Selanne (Mar.–May)
- Arena: Arrowhead Pond of Anaheim
- Average attendance: 15,107 (88.0%); Total: 619,380
- Minor league affiliate: Portland Pirates

Team leaders
- Goals: Teemu Selanne (40)
- Assists: Andy McDonald (51)
- Points: Teemu Selanne (90)
- Penalty minutes: Todd Fedoruk (174)
- Plus/minus: Teemu Selanne (+28)
- Wins: Jean-Sebastien Giguere (30)
- Goals against average: Ilya Bryzgalov (2.51)

The 2005–06 Mighty Ducks of Anaheim season was the 13th season of operation (12th season of play) for the National Hockey League (NHL) franchise. This would be the last season the team would be called the "Mighty Ducks of Anaheim".

== Off-season ==
On June 20, the Ducks hired Brian Burke as their executive vice president and general manager. Other key hirings included Bob Murray as the club's senior vice president of hockey operations on July 14 and Randy Carlyle as the head coach on August 1.

In the entry draft, the Mighty Ducks chose Bobby Ryan as their first-round pick, second overall. As the previous season had been cancelled, the draft order was set by lottery. The Mighty Ducks, given two balls in the lottery process, were likely to go in the middle of the pack, but instead received the second pick, the first going to the Pittsburgh Penguins, who selected Sidney Crosby.

The Mighty Ducks signed many free agents during the summer: enforcers Todd Fedoruk, Kip Brennan, Travis Moen and Trevor Gillies, defensemen Joe DiPenta and Scott Niedermayer, a former James Norris Memorial Trophy winner, who signed to play with his brother, Rob Niedermayer. Two former long-time Mighty Ducks rejoined the organisation, fan favorite Teemu Selanne and Jason Marshall.

Rookies Ryan Getzlaf, Corey Perry, Johan Hedstrom and Ilya Bryzglaov earned roster spots.

Several players were traded due to the new salary cap: Martin Gerber to the Carolina Hurricanes, Niclas Havelid to the Atlanta Thrashers, Vaclav Prospal to the Tampa Bay Lightning and team captain Steve Rucchin to the New York Rangers. Scott Niedermayer was named Rucchin's replacement as captain on October 3.

== Regular season ==
The Ducks finished third in the Pacific Division and sixth overall in the Western Conference to qualify for the playoffs.

=== Final standings ===
Pacific Division
No.	CR		GP	W	L	OTL	GF	GA	Pts
1	2	Dallas Stars	82	53	23	6	265	218	112
2	5	San Jose Sharks	82	44	27	11	266	242	99
3	6	Mighty Ducks of Anaheim	82	43	27	12	254	229	98
4	10	Los Angeles Kings	82	42	35	5	249	270	89
5	12	Phoenix Coyotes	82	38	39	5	246	271	81

Western Conference
R		Div	GP	W	L	OTL	GF	GA	Pts
1	P- Detroit Red Wings	CE	82	58	16	8	305	209	124
2	Y- Dallas Stars	PA	82	53	23	6	265	218	112
3	Y- Calgary Flames	NW	82	46	25	11	218	200	103
4	X- Nashville Predators	CE	82	49	25	8	259	227	106
5	X- San Jose Sharks	PA	82	44	27	11	266	242	99
6	X- Mighty Ducks of Anaheim	PA	82	43	27	12	254	229	98
7	X- Colorado Avalanche	NW	82	43	30	9	283	257	95
8	X- Edmonton Oilers	NW	82	41	28	13	256	251	95
8.5
9	Vancouver Canucks	NW	82	42	32	8	256	255	92
10	Los Angeles Kings	PA	82	42	35	5	249	270	89
11	Minnesota Wild	NW	82	38	36	8	231	215	84
12	Phoenix Coyotes	PA	82	38	39	5	246	271	81
13	Columbus Blue Jackets	CE	82	35	43	4	223	279	74
14	Chicago Blackhawks	CE	82	26	43	13	211	285	65
15	St. Louis Blues	CE	82	21	46	15	197	292	57

Divisions: CE – Central, PA – Pacific, NW – Northwest

P – Clinched Presidents Trophy; Y – Clinched division; X – Clinched playoff spot

== Playoffs ==
The Ducks won a seven-game Conference Quarterfinals (4–3) against the Calgary Flames. The Ducks next took on and defeated the Colorado Avalanche in the Conference Semifinals. The Ducks then advanced to the Conference Final for the second time in franchise history, though they lost the series four games to one to the Edmonton Oilers.

== Schedule and results ==
=== Preseason ===
2005 preseason
Preseason: 3–3–2 (home: 2–1–1; road: 1–2–1)

#	Date	Opponent	Score	OT	Win	Loss	Attendance	Record	Arena	Recap
1	September 17	@ Kings	4–2					0–1–0	Staples Center	L
2	September 21	Sharks	2–1	SO				0–1–1	Arrowhead Pond of Anaheim	OTL
3	September 23	Coyotes	5–3					1–1–1	Arrowhead Pond of Anaheim	W
4	September 24	@ Canucks	4–2					2–1–1	General Motors Place	W
5	September 25	@ Sharks	6–5					2–2–1	HP Pavilion at San Jose	L
6	September 28	Canucks	3–1					2–3–1	Arrowhead Pond of Anaheim	L
7	September 30	Kings	5–4		Giguère (2–2–0)	LaBarbera (0–2–0)	13,608	3–3–1	Arrowhead Pond of Anaheim	W
8	October 1	@ Coyotes	4–3	OT				3–3–2	Glendale Arena	L

Legend: W Win (2 points) L Loss (0 points) OTL Overtime/shootout loss (1 point)

=== Regular season ===
2005–06 regular season
October: 6–5–1 (home: 5–1–0; road: 1–4–1)

#	Date	Opponent	Score	OT	Win	Loss	Attendance	Record	Arena	Recap	Points
1	October 5	@ Blackhawks	5–3		Giguere (1–0–0)	Khabibulin (0–1–0)	16,533	1–0–0	United Center	W	2
2	October 8	@ Predators	3–2	SO	Vokoun (2–0–0)	Giguere (1–0–1)	16,279	1–0–1	Gaylord Entertainment Center	OTL	3
3	October 10	Oilers	4–2		Markkanen (2–0–0)	Giguere (1–1–1)	17,174	1–1–1	Arrowhead Pond of Anaheim	L	3
4	October 14	Blue Jackets	4–3		Giguere (2–1–1)	Leclaire (0–2–0)	12,930	2–1–1	Arrowhead Pond of Anaheim	W	5
5	October 16	@ Wild	4–1		Fernandez (1–0–1)	Giguere (2–2–1)	18,568	2–2–1	Xcel Energy Center	L	5
6	October 19	@ Blues	3–2		Lalime (2–4–0)	Bryzgalov (0–1–0)	10,882	2–3–1	Savvis Center	L	5
7	October 21	@ Red Wings	3–2		Legace (7–1–0)	Bryzgalov (0–2–0)	20,066	2–4–1	Joe Louis Arena	L	5
8	October 23	Coyotes	5–3		Bryzgalov (1–2–0)	LeNeveu (0–3–1)	13,733	3–4–1	Arrowhead Pond of Anaheim	W	7
9	October 25	@ Kings	3–1		LaBarbera (5–0–0)	Bryzgalov (1–3–0)	18,118	3–5–1	Staples Center	L	7
10	October 26	Flames	4–1		Giguere (3–2–1)	Kiprusoff (4–6–1)	11,774	4–5–1	Arrowhead Pond of Anaheim	W	9
11	October 28	Blues	6–4		Giguere (4–2–1)	Divis (0–1–0)	12,510	5–5–1	Arrowhead Pond of Anaheim	W	11
12	October 30	Coyotes	3–2		Giguere (5–2–1)	LeNeveu (1–4–1)	12,956	6–5–1	Arrowhead Pond of Anaheim	W	13

November: 5–6–3 (home: 4–4–2; road: 1–2–1)

#	Date	Opponent	Score	OT	Win	Loss	Attendance	Record	Arena	Box	Points
13	November 1	Predators	4–1		Giguere (6–2–1)	Vokoun (7–2–1)	11,690	7–5–1	Arrowhead Pond of Anaheim	W	15
14	November 3	@ Avalanche	4–3		Aebischer (6–3–0)	Bryzgalov (1–4–0)	18,007	7–6–1	Pepsi Center	L	15
15	November 4	Sharks	1–0	OT	Schaefer (5–0–0)	Giguere (6–2–2)	12,546	7–6–2	Arrowhead Pond of Anaheim	OTL	16
16	November 6	Wild	4–3	SO	Fernandez (5–2–1)	Giguere (6–2–3)	14,053	7–6–3	Arrowhead Pond of Anaheim	OTL	17
17	November 12	@ Coyotes	2–1	OT	Joseph (8–5–0)	Giguere (6–2–4)	16,358	7–6–4	Glendale Arena	OTL	18
18	November 13	Stars	3–1		Turco (9–5–1)	Giguere (6–3–4)	14,018	7–7–4	Arrowhead Pond of Anaheim	L	18
19	November 16	Stars	4–2		Turco (10–5–1)	Bryzgalov (1–5–0)	12,189	7–8–4	Arrowhead Pond of Anaheim	L	18
20	November 18	Avalanche	3–2		Budaj (3–2–2)	Bryzgalov (1–6–0)	15,614	7–9–4	Arrowhead Pond of Anaheim	L	18
21	November 20	Canucks	3–2		Cloutier (8–3–1)	Bryzgalov (1–7–0)	14,149	7–10–4	Arrowhead Pond of Anaheim	L	18
22	November 22	@ Coyotes	2–1		Bryzgalov (2–7–0)	Joseph (9–7–0)	13,696	8–10–4	Glendale Arena	W	20
23	November 23	@ Stars	3–1		Turco (12–5–1)	Bryzgalov (2–8–0)	18,532	8–11–4	American Airlines Center	L	20
24	November 25	Red Wings	3–1		Bryzgalov (3–8–0)	Osgood (3–2–2)	17,174	9–11–4	Arrowhead Pond of Anaheim	W	22
25	November 27	Blackhawks	3–1		Bryzgalov (4–8–0)	Khabibulin (7–13–0)	13,078	10–11–4	Arrowhead Pond of Anaheim	W	24
26	November 30	Coyotes	6–1		Bryzgalov (5–8–0)	LeNeveu (2–5–2)	12,050	11–11–4	Arrowhead Pond of Anaheim	W	26

December: 6–4–2 (home: 4–1–1; road: 2–3–1)

#	Date	Opponent	Score	OT	Win	Loss	Attendance	Record	Arena	Box	Points
27	December 3	Thrashers	2–1		Bryzgalov (6–8–0)	Garnett (3–5–1)	13,532	12–11–4	Arrowhead Pond of Anaheim	W	28
28	December 6	Hurricanes	6–2		Gerber (11–5–1)	Bryzgalov (6–9–0)	13,045	12–12–4	Arrowhead Pond of Anaheim	L	28
29	December 8	@ Sabres	3–2	OT	Biron (11–4–1)	Giguere (6–3–5)	12,504	12–12–5	HSBC Arena	OTL	29
30	December 10	@ Canadiens	5–3		Giguere (7–3–5)	Theodore (12–6–5)	21,273	13–12–5	Bell Centre	W	31
31	December 12	@ Maple Leafs	3–2		Tellqvist (4–2–1)	Giguere (7–4–5)	19,401	13–13–5	Air Canada Centre	L	31
32	December 14	Lightning	4–2		Giguere (8–4–5)	Grahame (14–9–1)	12,286	14–13–5	Arrowhead Pond of Anaheim	W	33
33	December 16	Kings	4–3	SO	Garon (11–7–0)	Giguere (8–4–6)	17,174	14–13–6	Arrowhead Pond of Anaheim	OTL	34
34	December 18	Sharks	5–4		Giguere (9–4–6)	Nabokov (7–8–4)	16,297	15–13–6	Arrowhead Pond of Anaheim	W	36
35	December 20	@ Sharks	4–2		Nabokov (8–8–4)	Giguere (9–5–6)	16,172	15–14–6	HP Pavilion at San Jose	L	36
36	December 21	Blues	6–3		Giguere (10–5–6)	Divis (0–3–0)	13,381	16–14–6	Arrowhead Pond of Anaheim	W	38
37	December 28	@ Blue Jackets	1–0		Denis (6–14–0)	Giguere (10–6–6)	17,387	16–15–6	Nationwide Arena	L	38
38	December 31	@ Blues	5–4	SO	Giguere (11–6–6)	Sanford (3–5–1)	13,286	17–15–6	Savvis Center	W	40

January: 7–2–4 (home: 3–1–1; road: 4–1–3)

#	Date	Opponent	Score	OT	Win	Loss	Attendance	Record	Arena	Box	Points
39	January 1	@ Predators	4–2		Bryzgalov (7–9–0)	Vokoun (19–7–2)	17,113	18–15–6	Gaylord Entertainment Center	W	42
40	January 6	@ Stars	4–3	SO	Hedberg (6–1–0)	Giguere (11–6–7)	18,532	18–15–7	American Airlines Center	OTL	43
41	January 7	@ Wild	4–1		Fernandez (15–5–3)	Bryzgalov (7–10–0)	18,568	18–16–7	Xcel Energy Center	L	43
42	January 9	Kings	6–2		Giguere (12–6–7)	Garon (19–10–0)	17,174	19–16–7	Arrowhead Pond of Anaheim	W	45
43	January 13	Capitals	3–2	OT	Johnson (3–5–0)	Giguere (12–6–8)	16,186	19–16–8	Arrowhead Pond of Anaheim	OTL	46
44	January 16	@ Bruins	4–3	OT	Thomas (1–0–1)	Bryzgalov (7–10–1)	15,279	19–16–9	TD Banknorth Garden	OTL	47
45	January 19	@ Senators	4–3	SO	Giguere (13–6–8)	Hasek (23–7–3)	19,387	20–16–9	Corel Centre	W	49
46	January 21	Panthers	1–0		Giguere (14–6–8)	Luongo (18–20–7)	17,011	21–16–9	Arrowhead Pond of Anaheim	W	51
47	January 23	@ Kings	3–2	SO	Garon (21–11–1)	Giguere (14–6–9)	18,118	21–16–10	Staples Center	OTL	52
48	January 25	Oilers	6–3		Markkanen (15–11–5)	Giguere (14–7–9)	14,456	21–17–10	Arrowhead Pond of Anaheim	L	52
49	January 26	@ Sharks	2–0		Bryzgalov (8–10–1)	Nabokov (13–13–5)	16,174	22–17–10	HP Pavilion at San Jose	W	54
50	January 28	@ Kings	6–2		Bryzgalov (9–10–1)	Garon (21–13–1)	18,118	23–17–10	Staples Center	W	56
51	January 30	Kings	4–3	OT	Bryzgalov (10–10–1)	Garon (21–13–2)	17,174	24–17–10	Arrowhead Pond of Anaheim	W	58

February: 3–2–1 (home: 1–1–0; road: 2–1–1)

#	Date	Opponent	Score	OT	Win	Loss	Attendance	Record	Arena	Box	Points
52	February 1	Sharks	6–4		Nabokov (14–13–6)	Bryzgalov (10–11–1)	16,542	24–18–10	Arrowhead Pond of Anaheim	L	58
53	February 4	@ Sharks	2–0		Giguere (15–7–9)	Nabokov (14–14–6)	17,496	25–18–10	HP Pavilion at San Jose	W	60
54	February 6	@ Oilers	6–5	SO	Morrison (10–2–0)	Giguere (15–7–10)	16,839	25–18–11	Rexall Place	OTL	61
55	February 8	@ Flames	3–1		Kiprusoff (29–14–7)	Giguere (15–8–10)	19,289	25–19–11	Pengrowth Saddledome	L	61
56	February 10	@ Canucks	3–1		Bryzgalov (11–11–1)	Auld (24–16–3)	18,630	26–19–11	General Motors Place	W	63
57	February 12	Blackhawks	4–1		Giguere (16–8–10)	Munro (3–4–2)	17,174	27–19–11	Arrowhead Pond of Anaheim	W	65
Feb. 15–26: 2006 Winter Olympics			Sweden Finland Czech Republic						Palasport Olimpico	Turin, Italy	

March: 11–4–1 (home: 6–1–1; road: 5–3–0)

#	Date	Opponent	Score	OT	Win	Loss	Attendance	Record	Arena	Box	Points
58	March 1	Red Wings	2–0		Osgood (14–5–3)	Giguere (16–9–10)	16,606	27–20–11	Arrowhead Pond of Anaheim	L	65
59	March 3	Wild	4–2		Giguere (17–9–10)	Roloson (6–17–1)	17,048	28–20–11	Arrowhead Pond of Anaheim	W	67
60	March 5	Blue Jackets	3–2	SO	Leclaire (6–11–2)	Giguere (17–9–11)	16,124	28–20–12	Arrowhead Pond of Anaheim	OTL	68
61	March 7	Sharks	5–4	OT	Giguere (18–9–11)	Nabokov (14–16–7)	15,488	29–20–12	Arrowhead Pond of Anaheim	W	70
62	March 11	@ Coyotes	5–3		Giguere (19–9–11)	Joseph (24–19–2)	17,799	30–20–12	Glendale Arena	W	72
63	March 12	Coyotes	5–2		Bryzgalov (12–11–1)	Sauve (3–5–0)	17,174	31–20–12	Arrowhead Pond of Anaheim	W	74
64	March 15	@ Red Wings	3–1		Osgood (16–5–3)	Giguere (19–10–11)	20,066	31–21–12	Joe Louis Arena	L	74
65	March 17	@ Blackhawks	2–1		Giguere (20–10–11)	Khabibulin (13–21–3)	12,031	32–21–12	United Center	W	76
66	March 19	@ Blue Jackets	4–3		Giguere (21–10–11)	Denis (15–24–0)	16,519	33–21–12	Nationwide Arena	W	78
67	March 20	@ Stars	2–1		Giguere (22–10–11)	Turco (36–17–3)	18,150	34–21–12	American Airlines Center	W	80
68	March 22	Avalanche	5–4	OT	Bryzgalov (13–11–1)	Budaj (10–8–5)	15,623	35–21–12	Arrowhead Pond of Anaheim	W	82
69	March 24	Predators	6–3		Giguere (23–10–11)	Vokoun (35–15–7)	16,377	36–21–12	Arrowhead Pond of Anaheim	W	84
70	March 25	@ Coyotes	5–2		Giguere (24–10–11)	LeNeveu (3–6–2)	17,605	37–21–12	Glendale Arena	W	86
71	March 28	@ Avalanche	4–3		Budaj (12–8–6)	Giguere (24–11–11)	18,007	37–22–12	Pepsi Center	L	86
72	March 29	@ Stars	2–1		Turco (39–17–3)	Giguere (24–12–11)	17,764	37–23–12	American Airlines Center	L	86
73	March 31	Stars	5–4	SO	Giguere (25–12–11)	Turco (39–17–4)	17,174	38–23–12	Arrowhead Pond of Anaheim	W	88

April: 5–4–0 (home: 3–1–0; road: 2–3–0)

#	Date	Opponent	Score	OT	Win	Loss	Attendance	Record	Arena	Box	Points
74	April 2	Canucks	6–2		Giguere (26–12–11)	Auld (32–23–5)	17,174	39–23–12	Arrowhead Pond of Anaheim	W	90
75	April 4	Kings	6–2		Giguere (27–12–11)	Garon (31–23–3)	17,174	40–23–12	Arrowhead Pond of Anaheim	W	92
76	April 6	Stars	5–3		Turco (40–17–5)	Giguere (27–13–11)	17,174	40–24–12	Arrowhead Pond of Anaheim	L	92
77	April 8	@ Kings	4–2		Giguere (28–13–11)	Garon (31–25–3)	17,242	41–24–12	Staples Center	W	94
78	April 10	@ Canucks	4–2		Giguere (29–13–11)	Auld (33–25–5)	18,630	42–24–12	General Motors Place	W	96
79	April 11	@ Flames	3–0		Kiprusoff (41–20–10)	Bryzgalov (13–12–1)	19,289	42–25–12	Pengrowth Saddledome	L	96
80	April 13	@ Oilers	2–1		Roloson (––)	Giguere (29–14–11)	16,839	42–26–12	Rexall Place	L	96
81	April 15	@ Sharks	6–3		Toskala (23–7–4)	Giguere (29–15–11)	17,496	42–27–12	HP Pavilion at San Jose	L	96
82	April 17	Flames	4–3		Giguere (30–15–11)	Boucher (4–8–0)	17,174	43–27–12	Arrowhead Pond of Anaheim	W	98

Legend: W Win (2 points) L Loss (0 points) OTL Overtime/shootout loss (1 point)

"Points" legend: 1st (Pacific Division) Not in Playoff Position In Playoff Position Clinched playoffs

=== Playoffs ===
2006 Stanley Cup playoffs
Western Conference Quarterfinals (4–3)

#	Date	Opponent	Score	OT	Win	Loss	Attendance	Series	Arena	Box
1	April 21	@ Flames	2–1	1OT	Kiprusoff (1–0)	Bryzgalov (0–1)	19,289	0–1	Pengrowth Saddledome	L
2	April 23	@ Flames	4–3		Giguere (1–0)	Kiprusoff (1–1)	19,289	1–1	Pengrowth Saddledome	W
3	April 25	Flames	5–2		Kiprusoff (2–1)	Giguere (1–1)	17,174	1–2	Arrowhead Pond of Anaheim	L
4	April 27	Flames	3–2	1OT	Giguere (2–1)	Kiprusoff (2–2)	17,174	2–2	Arrowhead Pond of Anaheim	W
5	April 29	@ Flames	3–2		Kiprusoff (3–2)	Giguere (2–2)	19,289	2–3	Pengrowth Saddledome	L
6	May 1	Flames	2–1		Bryzgalov (1–1)	Kiprusoff (3–3)	16,594	3–3	Arrowhead Pond of Anaheim	W
7	May 3	@ Flames	3–0		Bryzgalov (2–1)	Kiprusoff (3–4)	19,289	4–3	Pengrowth Saddledome	W

Western Conference Semifinals (4–0)

#	Date	Opponent	Score	OT	Win	Loss	Attendance	Series	Arena	Box
1	May 5	Avalanche	5–0		Bryzgalov (3–1)	Theodore (4–2)	17,174	1–0	Arrowhead Pond of Anaheim	W
2	May 7	Avalanche	3–0		Bryzgalov (4–1)	Theodore (4–3)	17,174	2–0	Arrowhead Pond of Anaheim	W
3	May 9	@ Avalanche	4–3	1OT	Bryzgalov (5–1)	Theodore (4–4)	18,007	3–0	Pepsi Center	W
4	May 11	@ Avalanche	4–1		Bryzgalov (6–1)	Theodore (4–5)	18,007	4–0	Pepsi Center	W

Western Conference Finals (1–4)

#	Date	Opponent	Score	OT	Win	Loss	Attendance	Series	Arena	Box
1	May 19	Oilers	3–1		Roloson (9–4)	Bryzgalov (6–2)	17,174	0–1	Arrowhead Pond of Anaheim	L
2	May 21	Oilers	3–1		Roloson (10–4)	Bryzgalov (6–3)	17,264	0–2	Arrowhead Pond of Anaheim	L
3	May 23	@ Oilers	5–4		Roloson (11–4)	Bryzgalov (6–4)	16,839	0–3	Rexall Place	L
4	May 25	@ Oilers	6–3		Giguere (3–2)	Roloson (11–5)	16,839	1–3	Rexall Place	W
5	May 27	Oilers	2–1		Roloson (12–5)	Giguere (3–3)	17,174	1–4	Arrowhead Pond of Anaheim	L

Legend: W Win L Loss

== Player statistics ==
=== Scoring ===
- Position abbreviations: C = Center; D = Defense; G = Goaltender; LW = Left wing; RW = Right wing
- † = Joined team via a transaction (e.g., trade, waivers, signing) during the season. Stats reflect time with the Mighty Ducks only.
- ‡ = Left team via a transaction (e.g., trade, waivers, release) during the season. Stats reflect time with the Mighty Ducks only.

No.	Player	Pos	Regular season						Playoffs					
No.	Player	Pos	GP	G	A	Pts	+/-	PIM	GP	G	A	Pts	+/-	PIM
13	Teemu Selanne	RW	80	40	50	90	28	44	16	6	8	14	0	6
19	Andy McDonald	C	82	34	51	85	24	32	16	2	7	9	0	10
27	Scott Niedermayer	D	82	13	50	63	8	96	16	2	9	11	1	14
15	Joffrey Lupul	RW	81	28	25	53	−13	48	16	9	2	11	9	31
38	Chris Kunitz†	LW	67	19	22	41	19	69	16	3	5	8	−1	8
44	Rob Niedermayer	C	76	15	24	39	−5	89	16	1	3	4	−1	10
51	Ryan Getzlaf	C	57	14	25	39	6	22	16	3	4	7	−3	13
23	Francois Beauchemin†	D	61	8	26	34	8	41	16	3	6	9	0	11
17	Jonathan Hedstrom	RW	79	13	14	27	2	48	3	0	1	1	0	2
61	Corey Perry	RW	56	13	12	25	1	50	11	0	3	3	−4	16
22	Todd Marchant†	C	61	6	19	25	3	46	16	3	10	13	14	14
29	Todd Fedoruk	LW	76	4	19	23	6	174	12	0	0	0	−1	16
26	Samuel Pahlsson	C	82	11	10	21	−1	34	16	2	3	5	2	18
39	Petr Sykora‡	RW	34	7	13	20	1	28	—	—	—	—	—	—
24	Ruslan Salei	D	78	1	18	19	17	114	16	3	2	5	10	18
3	Keith Carney‡	D	61	2	16	18	13	48	—	—	—	—	—	—
33	Joe DiPenta	D	72	2	6	8	8	46	16	0	0	0	1	13
5	Vitaly Vishnevski	D	82	1	7	8	8	91	16	0	4	4	2	10
25	Zenon Konopka	C	23	4	3	7	−4	48	—	—	—	—	—	—
76	Dustin Penner	LW	19	4	3	7	3	14	13	3	6	9	10	12
8	Sandis Ozolinsh‡	D	17	3	3	6	−4	8	—	—	—	—	—	—
32	Travis Moen	LW	39	4	1	5	−3	72	9	1	0	1	1	10
28	Tyler Wright†	C	25	2	2	4	2	31	—	—	—	—	—	—
12	Jeff Friesen†	LW	18	1	3	4	−4	8	16	3	1	4	−1	6
6	Jason Marshall	D	23	0	4	4	2	34	—	—	—	—	—	—
21	Sean O'Donnell†	D	21	1	2	3	3	26	16	2	3	5	8	23
30	Ilya Bryzgalov	G	31	0	2	2		4	11	0	0	0		2
7	Bruno St. Jacques	D	1	1	0	1	1	0	—	—	—	—	—	—
37	Kip Brennan	LW	12	0	1	1	−2	35	—	—	—	—	—	—
91	Sergei Fedorov‡	C	5	0	1	1	−1	2	—	—	—	—	—	—
40	Aaron Gavey	C	5	0	0	0	0	2	—	—	—	—	—	—
35	Jean-Sebastien Giguere	G	60	0	0	0		20	6	0	0	0		0
42	Trevor Gillies	LW	1	0	0	0	0	21	—	—	—	—	—	—

=== Goaltending ===
No.	Player	Regular season										Playoffs								
No.	Player	GP	W	L	OT	SA	GA	GAA	SV%	SO	TOI	GP	W	L	SA	GA	GAA	SV%	SO	TOI
35	Jean-Sebastien Giguere	60	30	15	11	1692	150	2.66	.911	2	3381	6	3	3	132	18	3.40	.864	0	318
30	Ilya Bryzgalov	31	13	12	1	733	66	2.51	.910	1	1575	11	6	4	285	16	1.46	.944	3	659

== Awards and records ==
=== Awards ===
Type	Award/honor	Recipient	Ref
League (annual)	Bill Masterton Memorial Trophy	Teemu Selanne	
League (annual)	NHL First All-Star Team	Scott Niedermayer (Defense)	
League (in-season)	NHL Offensive Player of the Week	Teemu Selanne (March 27)	

=== Milestones ===
Milestone	Player	Date	Ref
First game	Ryan Getzlaf	October 5, 2005	
First game	Corey Perry	October 5, 2005	
First game	Zenon Konopka	October 30, 2005	
First game	Trevor Gillies	November 6, 2005	
First game	Dustin Penner	November 23, 2005	
1,000th point	Teemu Selanne	January 30, 2006	

== Transactions ==
The Mighty Ducks were involved in the following transactions from February 17, 2005, the day after the 2004–05 NHL season was officially cancelled, through June 19, 2006, the day of the deciding game of the 2006 Stanley Cup Finals.

=== Trades ===
Date	Details		Ref
July 29, 2005	To Philadelphia Flyers: 2nd-round pick in 2005	To Mighty Ducks of Anaheim: Todd Fedoruk	
July 30, 2005	To Chicago Blackhawks: Michael Holmqvist	To Mighty Ducks of Anaheim: Travis Moen	
July 30, 2005	To San Jose Sharks: 6th-round pick in 2005; 7th-round pick in 2006	To Mighty Ducks of Anaheim: 5th-round pick in 2005	
August 1, 2005 (Note: Compensation due to Anaheim hiring Randy Carlyle as their head coach.)	To Vancouver Canucks: 3rd-round pick in 2006; 2nd-round pick in 2007	To Mighty Ducks of Anaheim: 3rd-round pick in 2008	
August 23, 2005	To Phoenix Coyotes: Mike Leclerc	To Mighty Ducks of Anaheim: Conditional 4th-round pick in 2007	
August 23, 2005	To New York Rangers: Steve Rucchin	To Mighty Ducks of Anaheim: Trevor Gillies; Conditional 7th-round pick in 2007	
August 25, 2005	To Atlanta Thrashers: Mark Popovic	To Mighty Ducks of Anaheim: Kip Brennan	
October 3, 2005	To Carolina Hurricanes: Craig Adams	To Mighty Ducks of Anaheim: Bruno St. Jacques	
November 15, 2005	To Columbus Blue Jackets: Sergei Fedorov; 5th-round pick in 2006	To Mighty Ducks of Anaheim: Francois Beauchemin; Tyler Wright	
January 9, 2006	To New York Rangers: Petr Sykora; 4th-round pick in 2007	To Mighty Ducks of Anaheim: Maxim Kondratyev	
March 1, 2006	To Atlanta Thrashers: Joel Stepp	To Mighty Ducks of Anaheim: Jani Hurme	
March 9, 2006	To Phoenix Coyotes: Joel Perrault	To Mighty Ducks of Anaheim: Sean O'Donnell	
March 9, 2006	To Washington Capitals: 2nd-round pick in 2006	To Mighty Ducks of Anaheim: Jeff Friesen	
March 9, 2006	To New York Rangers: Sandis Ozolinsh	To Mighty Ducks of Anaheim: San Jose’s 3rd-round pick in 2006	
March 9, 2006	To Vancouver Canucks: Keith Carney; Rights to Juha Alen	To Mighty Ducks of Anaheim: Brett Skinner; 2nd-round pick in 2006	

=== Players acquired ===
Date	Player	Former team	Term	Via	Ref
August 4, 2005	Scott Niedermayer	New Jersey Devils	4-year	Free agency	
August 8, 2005	Jason Marshall	New York Rangers	1-year	Free agency	
August 11, 2005	Joe DiPenta	Vancouver Canucks	1-year	Free agency	
August 22, 2005	Teemu Selanne	Colorado Avalanche	1-year	Free agency	
August 25, 2005	Craig Adams	Milano Vipers (ITA)	1-year	Free agency	
August 30, 2005	Kent Huskins	Manitoba Moose (AHL)	1-year	Free agency	
August 30, 2005	Geoff Peters	Rochester Americans (AHL)	1-year	Free agency	
September 12, 2005	Aaron Gavey	Utah Grizzlies (AHL)	1-year	Free agency	
September 14, 2005	Brett Festerling	Vancouver Giants (WHL)	3-year	Free agency	
September 29, 2005	Michael Wall	Everett Silvertips (WHL)	3-year	Free agency	
October 18, 2005	Chris Kunitz	Atlanta Thrashers		Waivers	
November 21, 2005	Todd Marchant	Columbus Blue Jackets		Waivers	
November 28, 2005	Nathan Marsters	Portland Pirates (AHL)	2-year	Free agency	
November 28, 2005	Ryan Shannon	Portland Pirates (AHL)	2-year	Free agency	
April 1, 2006	David McKee	Cornell University (ECAC)	2-year	Free agency	

=== Players lost ===
Date	Player	New team	Via (Note: In parentheses is the player's free agency group on August 1 if applicable.)	Ref
August 3, 2005	Martin Skoula	Dallas Stars	Free agency (UFA)	
August 4, 2005	Sheldon Brookbank	Nashville Predators	Free agency (UFA)	
August 4, 2005	Kurtis Foster	Minnesota Wild	Free agency (UFA)	
August 5, 2005	Alexei Smirnov	Avangard Omsk (RSL)	Free agency (UFA)	
August 15, 2005	Garrett Burnett	Dallas Stars	Free agency (VI)	
August 19, 2005	Tomas Malec	Ottawa Senators	Free agency (UFA)	
August 20, 2005	Stanislav Chistov	Metallurg Magnitogorsk (RSL)	Free agency (II) (Note: Anaheim retained Chistov’s NHL rights and re-signed him on July 10, 2006.)	
August 26, 2005	Lance Ward	Ottawa Senators	Free agency (UFA)	
September 13, 2005	Cory Pecker	Phoenix Roadrunners (ECHL)	Free agency (UFA)	
September 17, 2005	Eddy Ferhi	Orques d'Anglet (FRA)	Free agency (UFA)	
October 4, 2005	Chris Kunitz	Atlanta Thrashers	Waivers	
April 26, 2006	Jani Hurme	HC TPS (SM-l)	Free agency (Note: Contract for the 2006–07 season. Hurme remained with Anaheim’s AHL affiliate through the end of the 2006 Calder Cup playoffs.)	
June 7, 2006	Jason Marshall	Kolner Haie (DEL)	Free agency	

=== Signings ===
Date	Player	Term	Contract type	Ref
July 29, 2005	Ilya Bryzgalov	1-year	Option exercised	
July 29, 2005	Sandis Ozolinsh	2-year	Re-signing	
July 29, 2005	Nathan Saunders	3-year	Entry-level	
August 4, 2005	Rob Niedermayer	4-year	Re-signing	
August 11, 2005	Mike Leclerc	1-year	Re-signing	
August 12, 2005	Chris Kunitz	1-year	Re-signing	
August 12, 2005	Travis Moen	1-year	Re-signing	
August 15, 2005	Mark Popovic	1-year	Re-signing	
August 18, 2005	Jonathan Hedstrom	2-year	Re-signing	
August 19, 2005	Shane Hynes	3-year	Entry-level	
August 24, 2005	Samuel Pahlsson	2-year	Re-signing	
August 24, 2005	Ladislav Smid	3-year	Entry-level	
August 26, 2005	Jordan Smith	3-year	Entry-level	
September 7, 2005	Ruslan Salei	1-year	Re-signing	
September 21, 2005	Kip Brennan		Re-signing	
March 8, 2006	Bobby Ryan	3-year	Entry-level	
May 4, 2006	Drew Miller	2-year	Entry-level	
May 31, 2006	Bjorn Melin	1-year	Entry-level	
June 13, 2006	Teemu Selanne	1-year	Re-signing	
June 14, 2006	Travis Moen	1-year	Re-signing	
June 19, 2006	Joe DiPenta	1-year	Re-signing	

== Draft picks ==
The Ducks' picks at the 2005 NHL entry draft, July 30–31, 2005 in Ottawa, Ontario, Canada.

Round	#	Player	Position	Nationality	College/Junior/Club team (League)
1	2	Bobby Ryan	Right wing	United States	Owen Sound Attack (OHL)
2	31	Brendan Mikkelson	Defense	Canada	Portland Winterhawks (WHL)
3	63	Jason Bailey	Right wing	Canada	US National Team Development Program (NAHL)
5	127	Bobby Bolt	Left wing	Canada	Kingston Frontenacs (OHL)
5	141	Brian Salcido	Defense	United States	Colorado College (WCHA)
7	197	Jean-Philippe Levasseur	Goaltender	Canada	Rouyn-Noranda Huskies (QMJHL)

== Farm teams ==
After nine seasons the Cincinnati Mighty Ducks ceased operations as the Portland Pirates became the new AHL affiliate.
