= 2005–06 Phoenix Coyotes season =

NHL hockey team season

2005–06 Phoenix Coyotes
- Division: 5th Pacific
- Conference: 12th Western
- 2005–06 record: 38–39–5
- Home record: 19–17–4
- Road record: 19–22–1
- Goals for: 246
- Goals against: 271

Team information
- General manager: Mike Barnett
- Coach: Wayne Gretzky
- Captain: Shane Doan
- Alternate captains: Derek Morris (Note: Morris served as alternate captain for home games and O'Donnell for road games. Morris became alternate captain on a full-time basis after O'Donnell was traded to Anaheim on March 9.); Sean O'Donnell (Oct.–Mar.); Mike Ricci
- Arena: Glendale Arena
- Average attendance: 15,582
- Minor league affiliates: San Antonio Rampage; Stockton Thunder

Team leaders
- Goals: Mike Comrie and Shane Doan (30)
- Assists: Shane Doan (36)
- Points: Shane Doan (66)
- Penalty minutes: Shane Doan (123)
- Plus/minus: Ladislav Nagy (+8)
- Wins: Curtis Joseph (32)
- Goals against average: Curtis Joseph (2.91)

The 2005–06 Phoenix Coyotes season was the franchise's 34th season overall, 27th season in the National Hockey League and tenth season in Phoenix. Retired player Wayne Gretzky was named coach. The Coyotes missed the playoffs for the third consecutive year.

== Offseason ==
Key dates prior to the start of the season:

- The 2005 NHL entry draft took place in Ottawa, Ontario, Canada on July 30, 2005.
- The free agency period began on August 1.
- On August 6, 2004, Brett Hull, son of former Jet Bobby Hull, was signed. After wearing his customary number 16 during the preseason and the first two games of the regular season, he was re-assigned the elder Hull's retired number 9.
- August 8, 2005 – The Coyotes introduced Gretzky as its new head coach, replacing Rick Bowness, despite the fact that he had never coached at any level of hockey. The Coyotes Ring of Honor was unveiled on October 8, inducting Gretzky and Bobby Hull. One week later, Brett Hull announced his retirement. On January 21, 2006, Jets great Thomas Steen was the third inductee to the Ring of Honor. On April 13, Steve Ellman announced an agreement for Jerry Moyes to assume majority ownership control of the Coyotes, Glendale Arena and the National Lacrosse League's Arizona Sting.

== Wayne Gretzky ==
Despite previous denials that Wayne Gretzky would not assume coaching duties, on August 8, 2005 Gretzky agreed to become the new coach of the Coyotes.

In the time leading up to Gretzky's announcement, several prominent free agents signed with Phoenix citing the chance to play for Gretzky, including Brett Hull. Hull, who was briefly Gretzky's right winger, only lasted five games and only scored one assist before retiring. Ironically, "The Golden Brett" would have had the record for the most goals over any given three seasons — he scored 228 goals between 1989–90 and 1991–92 — if it weren't for The Great One. From 1981–82 to 1983–84, Gretzky scored 254 goals.

Gretzky made his coaching debut on October 5, 2005, the opening night of the 2005–06 NHL season, losing 3–2 to the Vancouver Canucks. His first coaching victory was October 8, 2005, beating the Minnesota Wild 2–1. Gretzky took an indefinite leave of absence as coach on December 17, 2005 to care for his ill mother in Brantford, Ontario. His mother lost her battle to lung cancer two days later, dying on December 19, 2005. Assistant coach Rick Tocchet assumed the position until Gretzky's return on December 28. Coyotes' CEO Jeff Shumway announced on June 5, 2006 that Gretzky has agreed to a new five-year contract to remain as head coach.

== Regular season ==
Also in the 2005–06 season, the Coyotes were planning to host the NHL all-star game. Due to the XX Winter Olympic Games, the game was canceled. Wayne Gretzky was the General Manager of the Canadian Olympic Hockey Team. Coyotes captain Shane Doan was selected for the Canadian team.

The Coyotes tied the Los Angeles Kings for most power-play opportunities, with 541.

=== Final standings ===
Pacific Division
No.	CR		GP	W	L	OTL	GF	GA	Pts
1	2	Dallas Stars	82	53	23	6	265	218	112
2	5	San Jose Sharks	82	44	27	11	266	242	99
3	6	Mighty Ducks of Anaheim	82	43	27	12	254	229	98
4	10	Los Angeles Kings	82	42	35	5	249	270	89
5	12	Phoenix Coyotes	82	38	39	5	246	271	81

Western Conference
R		Div	GP	W	L	OTL	GF	GA	Pts
1	P- Detroit Red Wings	CE	82	58	16	8	305	209	124
2	Y- Dallas Stars	PA	82	53	23	6	265	218	112
3	Y- Calgary Flames	NW	82	46	25	11	218	200	103
4	X- Nashville Predators	CE	82	49	25	8	259	227	106
5	X- San Jose Sharks	PA	82	44	27	11	266	242	99
6	X- Mighty Ducks of Anaheim	PA	82	43	27	12	254	229	98
7	X- Colorado Avalanche	NW	82	43	30	9	283	257	95
8	X- Edmonton Oilers	NW	82	41	28	13	256	251	95
8.5
9	Vancouver Canucks	NW	82	42	32	8	256	255	92
10	Los Angeles Kings	PA	82	42	35	5	249	270	89
11	Minnesota Wild	NW	82	38	36	8	231	215	84
12	Phoenix Coyotes	PA	82	38	39	5	246	271	81
13	Columbus Blue Jackets	CE	82	35	43	4	223	279	74
14	Chicago Blackhawks	CE	82	26	43	13	211	285	65
15	St. Louis Blues	CE	82	21	46	15	197	292	57

Divisions: CE – Central, PA – Pacific, NW – Northwest

P – Clinched Presidents Trophy; Y – Clinched division; X – Clinched playoff spot

== Schedule and results ==
2005–06 regular season
October: 5–8–1 (home: 3–2–1; road: 2–6–0)

Game	Date	Score	Opponent	Record	Recap
1	October 5, 2005	2–3	@ Vancouver Canucks (2005–06)	0–1–0	L
2	October 6, 2005	2–3	@ Los Angeles Kings (2005–06)	0–2–0	L
3	October 8, 2005	2–1	Minnesota Wild (2005–06)	1–2–0	W
4	October 11, 2005	2–3	@ Dallas Stars (2005–06)	1–3–0	L
5	October 13, 2005	4–5 SO	Nashville Predators (2005–06)	1–3–1	OTL
6	October 15, 2005	0–2	Detroit Red Wings (2005–06)	1–4–1	L
7	October 17, 2005	2–0	@ Calgary Flames (2005–06)	2–4–1	W
8	October 18, 2005	4–3 OT	@ Edmonton Oilers (2005–06)	3–4–1	W
9	October 20, 2005	2–3	@ Vancouver Canucks (2005–06)	3–5–1	L
10	October 23, 2005	3–5	@ Mighty Ducks of Anaheim (2005–06)	3–6–1	L
11	October 25, 2005	5–4 OT	St. Louis Blues (2005–06)	4–6–1	W
12	October 27, 2005	3–2	Calgary Flames (2005–06)	5–6–1	W
13	October 29, 2005	3–5	Dallas Stars (2005–06)	5–7–1	L
14	October 30, 2005	2–3	@ Mighty Ducks of Anaheim (2005–06)	5–8–1	L

November: 8–4–1 (home: 4–3–0; road: 4–1–1)

Game	Date	Score	Opponent	Record	Recap
15	November 3, 2005	4–0	Los Angeles Kings (2005–06)	6–8–1	W
16	November 5, 2005	4–1	@ Detroit Red Wings (2005–06)	7–8–1	W
17	November 6, 2005	1–2 OT	@ Chicago Blackhawks (2005–06)	7–8–2	OTL
18	November 8, 2005	4–2	@ Minnesota Wild (2005–06)	8–8–2	W
19	November 10, 2005	3–4	Calgary Flames (2005–06)	8–9–2	L
20	November 12, 2005	2–1 OT	Mighty Ducks of Anaheim (2005–06)	9–9–2	W
21	November 16, 2005	1–3	Colorado Avalanche (2005–06)	9–10–2	L
22	November 19, 2005	4–3 SO	@ San Jose Sharks (2005–06)	10–10–2	W
23	November 20, 2005	5–1	Columbus Blue Jackets (2005–06)	11–10–2	W
24	November 22, 2005	1–2	Mighty Ducks of Anaheim (2005–06)	11–11–2	L
25	November 25, 2005	4–1	@ Dallas Stars (2005–06)	12–11–2	W
26	November 26, 2005	2–1	Vancouver Canucks (2005–06)	13–11–2	W
27	November 30, 2005	1–6	@ Mighty Ducks of Anaheim (2005–06)	13–12–2	L

December: 7–6–0 (home: 4–2–0; road: 3–4–0)

Game	Date	Score	Opponent	Record	Recap
28	December 3, 2005	8–4	Carolina Hurricanes (2005–06)	14–12–2	W
29	December 5, 2005	5–2	Atlanta Thrashers (2005–06)	15–12–2	W
30	December 11, 2005	2–1 OT	@ Boston Bruins (2005–06)	16–12–2	W
31	December 13, 2005	2–5	@ Montreal Canadiens (2005–06)	16–13–2	L
32	December 15, 2005	1–3	Tampa Bay Lightning (2005–06)	16–14–2	L
33	December 17, 2005	1–4	@ Los Angeles Kings (2005–06)	16–15–2	L
34	December 20, 2005	4–5	St. Louis Blues (2005–06)	16–16–2	L
35	December 22, 2005	2–1	San Jose Sharks (2005–06)	17–16–2	W
36	December 23, 2005	3–2	@ Dallas Stars (2005–06)	18–16–2	W
37	December 26, 2005	4–7	@ Colorado Avalanche (2005–06)	18–17–2	L
38	December 28, 2005	5–4	@ San Jose Sharks (2005–06)	19–17–2	W
39	December 29, 2005	6–5 OT	Los Angeles Kings (2005–06)	20–17–2	W
40	December 31, 2005	2–5	Colorado Avalanche (2005–06)	20–18–2	L

January: 6–7–1 (home: 3–3–1; road: 3–4–0)

Game	Date	Score	Opponent	Record	Recap
41	January 5, 2006	0–4	@ Los Angeles Kings (2005–06)	20–19–2	L
42	January 8, 2006	2–5	Columbus Blue Jackets (2005–06)	20–20–2	L
43	January 10, 2006	2–7	@ Ottawa Senators (2005–06)	20–21–2	L
44	January 12, 2006	2–1 SO	@ Buffalo Sabres (2005–06)	21–21–2	W
45	January 14, 2006	4–3	@ Toronto Maple Leafs (2005–06)	22–21–2	W
46	January 16, 2006	1–6	Washington Capitals (2005–06)	22–22–2	L
47	January 19, 2006	6–3	Florida Panthers (2005–06)	23–22–2	W
48	January 21, 2006	4–3 SO	Edmonton Oilers (2005–06)	24–22–2	W
49	January 23, 2006	1–4	@ Dallas Stars (2005–06)	24–23–2	L
50	January 24, 2006	2–3	@ Minnesota Wild (2005–06)	24–24–2	L
51	January 26, 2006	5–3	@ St. Louis Blues (2005–06)	25–24–2	W
52	January 28, 2006	6–2	San Jose Sharks (2005–06)	26–24–2	W
53	January 29, 2006	3–4 SO	Edmonton Oilers (2005–06)	26–24–3	OTL
54	January 31, 2006	4–7	Vancouver Canucks (2005–06)	26–25–3	L

February: 1–3–1 (home: 1–3–1; road: 0–0–0)

Game	Date	Score	Opponent	Record	Recap
55	February 2, 2006	2–1 SO	Los Angeles Kings (2005–06)	27–25–3	W
56	February 4, 2006	4–6	Minnesota Wild (2005–06)	27–26–3	L
57	February 7, 2006	1–3	Chicago Blackhawks (2005–06)	27–27–3	L
58	February 9, 2006	1–5	Dallas Stars (2005–06)	27–28–3	L
59	February 12, 2006	4–5 OT	San Jose Sharks (2005–06)	27–28–4	OTL

March: 8–6–0 (home: 3–3–0; road: 5–3–0)

Game	Date	Score	Opponent	Record	Recap
60	March 2, 2006	6–2	Dallas Stars (2005–06)	28–28–4	W
61	March 4, 2006	3–7	Detroit Red Wings (2005–06)	28–29–4	L
62	March 7, 2006	5–2	@ Detroit Red Wings (2005–06)	29–29–4	W
63	March 9, 2006	4–5	@ Columbus Blue Jackets (2005–06)	29–30–4	L
64	March 11, 2006	3–5	Mighty Ducks of Anaheim (2005–06)	29–31–4	L
65	March 12, 2006	2–5	@ Mighty Ducks of Anaheim (2005–06)	29–32–4	L
66	March 14, 2006	6–2	@ Los Angeles Kings (2005–06)	30–32–4	W
67	March 16, 2006	0–2	@ Nashville Predators (2005–06)	30–33–4	L
68	March 19, 2006	3–2	@ Chicago Blackhawks (2005–06)	31–33–4	W
69	March 21, 2006	5–2	@ Columbus Blue Jackets (2005–06)	32–33–4	W
70	March 23, 2006	4–3	Chicago Blackhawks (2005–06)	33–33–4	W
71	March 25, 2006	2–5	Mighty Ducks of Anaheim (2005–06)	33–34–4	L
72	March 28, 2006	5–3	Nashville Predators (2005–06)	34–34–4	W
73	March 30, 2006	5–2	@ San Jose Sharks (2005–06)	35–34–4	W

April: 3–5–1 (home: 1–1–1; road: 2–4–0)

Game	Date	Score	Opponent	Record	Recap
74	April 1, 2006	4–3 OT	@ San Jose Sharks (2005–06)	36–34–4	W
75	April 3, 2006	1–7	@ Edmonton Oilers (2005–06)	36–35–4	L
76	April 5, 2006	2–5	@ Calgary Flames (2005–06)	36–36–4	L
77	April 8, 2006	2–3 SO	Dallas Stars (2005–06)	36–36–5	OTL
78	April 10, 2006	2–3	San Jose Sharks (2005–06)	36–37–5	L
79	April 11, 2006	4–6	@ Colorado Avalanche (2005–06)	36–38–5	L
80	April 13, 2006	3–0	Los Angeles Kings (2005–06)	37–38–5	W
81	April 15, 2006	1–5	@ Nashville Predators (2005–06)	37–39–5	L
82	April 16, 2006	3–0	@ St. Louis Blues (2005–06)	38–39–5	W

Legend: W Win (2 points) L Loss (0 points) OTL Overtime/shootout loss (1 point)

== Player statistics ==
=== Scoring ===
- Position abbreviations: C = Center; D = Defense; G = Goaltender; LW = Left wing; RW = Right wing
- † = Joined team via a transaction (e.g., trade, waivers, signing) during the season. Stats reflect time with the Coyotes only.
- ‡ = Left team via a transaction (e.g., trade, waivers, release) during the season. Stats reflect time with the Coyotes only.

No.	Player	Pos	Regular season					
No.	Player	Pos	GP	G	A	Pts	+/-	PIM
19	Shane Doan	RW	82	30	36	66	−9	123
89	Mike Comrie	C	80	30	30	60	2	55
17	Ladislav Nagy	LW	51	15	41	56	8	74
12	Mike Johnson	RW	80	16	38	54	7	50
23	Paul Mara	D	78	15	32	47	−12	70
8	Geoff Sanderson†	LW	75	25	21	46	−14	58
2	Keith Ballard	D	82	8	31	39	−18	99
53	Derek Morris	D	53	6	21	27	−7	54
91	Oleg Saprykin	LW	67	11	14	25	−16	50
4 (Note: Michalek wore number 39 in his first four games.)	Zbynek Michalek	D	82	9	15	24	4	62
29	Steve Reinprecht†	C	28	12	11	23	1	8
38	Dave Scatchard†	C	47	11	12	23	−11	84
20	Fredrik Sjostrom	RW	75	6	17	23	1	42
15	Boyd Devereaux	C	78	8	14	22	−13	44
28 (Note: Leclerc wore number 7 in his first four games.)	Mike Leclerc‡	LW	35	9	12	21	0	29
16	Jamie Lundmark†‡	C	38	5	13	18	−1	36
40	Mike Ricci	C	78	10	6	16	−22	69
11	Oleg Kvasha†	LW	15	4	7	11	5	6
3	Denis Gauthier‡	D	45	2	9	11	−4	61
93	Petr Nedved‡	C	25	2	9	11	−6	34
22	Dennis Seidenberg†	D	34	1	10	11	−9	14
21	Sean O'Donnell‡	D	57	1	7	8	3	121
18	Tyson Nash	LW	50	0	6	6	−7	84
5	Jamie Rivers†	D	18	0	5	5	2	26
5	David Tanabe‡	D	21	0	4	4	−5	8
11	Krys Kolanos‡†‡	C	9	2	1	3	2	2
21	Bill Thomas†	RW	9	1	2	3	−2	8
26	Joel Perrault†	C	5	1	1	2	0	2
55	Matt Jones	D	16	0	2	2	−2	14
24	Josh Gratton†	LW	11	1	0	1	−3	30
29	Yanick Lehoux†‡†	C	3	1	0	1	1	2
14	Steve Gainey†	LW	20	0	1	1	−3	20
9 (Note: Hull wore number 16 in his first two games.)	Brett Hull‡	RW	5	0	1	1	−3	0
31	Curtis Joseph	G	60	0	1	1		18
6	Matthew Spiller	D	8	0	1	1	−1	13
33	Brian Boucher‡	G	11	0	0	0		2
28	Pavel Brendl†	RW	2	0	0	0	−3	0
29	Tim Jackman†‡	RW	8	0	0	0	1	21
30	David LeNeveu	G	15	0	0	0		0
22	Pascal Rheaume†	C	1	0	0	0	−1	0
13	Michael Rupp‡	C	1	0	0	0	0	0
35	Philippe Sauve†	G	5	0	0	0		0
14	Jeff Taffe‡†	C	2	0	0	0	0	0

=== Goaltending ===
- † = Joined team via a transaction (e.g., trade, waivers, signing) during the season. Stats reflect time with the Coyotes only.
- ‡ = Left team via a transaction (e.g., trade, waivers, release) during the season. Stats reflect time with the Coyotes only.

No.	Player	Regular season									
No.	Player	GP	W	L	OT	SA	GA	GAA	SV%	SO	TOI
31	Curtis Joseph	60	32	21	3	1690	166	2.91	.902	4	3424
33	Brian Boucher‡	11	3	6	0	268	33	3.87	.877	0	512
30	David LeNeveu	15	3	8	2	386	44	3.24	.886	0	814
35	Philippe Sauve†	5	0	4	0	128	17	5.45	.867	0	187

== Awards and records ==
=== Awards ===
Type	Award/honor	Recipient	Ref
League (in-season)	NHL Offensive Player of the Week	Steven Reinprecht (April 3)	
Team	Hardest Working Player Award	Keith Ballard	
Team	Leading Scorer Award	Shane Doan	
Team	Man of the Year Award	Keith Ballard	
Team	Man of the Year Award	Fredrik Sjostrom	
Team	Team MVP Award	Curtis Joseph	
Team	Three-Star Award	Curtis Joseph	

=== Milestones ===
Milestone	Player	Date	Ref
First game	Keith Ballard	October 5, 2005	
First game	David LeNeveu	October 6, 2005	
First game	Yanick Lehoux	November 8, 2005	
First game	Matt Jones	November 25, 2005	
First game	Bill Thomas	March 28, 2006	
First game	Joel Perrault	April 8, 2006	
1,000th game played	Geoff Sanderson	April 8, 2006	

== Transactions ==
The Coyotes were involved in the following transactions from February 17, 2005, the day after the 2004–05 NHL season was officially cancelled, through June 19, 2006, the day of the deciding game of the 2006 Stanley Cup Final.

=== Trades ===
Date	Details		Ref
July 28, 2005	To Tampa Bay Lightning: Jason Jaspers	To Phoenix Coyotes: Jarrod Skalde	
July 30, 2005	To Philadelphia Flyers: Columbus’ 4th-round pick in 2005; 2nd-round pick in 2006	To Phoenix Coyotes: Anaheim’s 2nd-round pick in 2005	
August 23, 2005	To Anaheim Mighty Ducks: Conditional 4th-round pick in 2007	To Phoenix Coyotes: Mike Leclerc	
August 26, 2005	To Minnesota Wild: Erik Westrum; Dustin Wood	To Phoenix Coyotes: Zbynek Michalek	
October 8, 2005	To Columbus Blue Jackets: Jason Chimera; Cale Hulse; Mike Rupp	To Phoenix Coyotes: Tim Jackman; Geoff Sanderson	
October 18, 2005	To New York Rangers: Jeff Taffe	To Phoenix Coyotes: Jamie Lundmark	
October 24, 2005	To Nashville Predators: Rick Berry	To Phoenix Coyotes: Future considerations	
November 18, 2005	To Boston Bruins: David Tanabe	To Phoenix Coyotes: Dave Scatchard	
November 25, 2005	To New Jersey Devils: Brad Ference	To Phoenix Coyotes: Pascal Rheaume; Ray Schultz; Steven Spencer	
December 28, 2005	To Philadelphia Flyers: Kiel McLeod	To Phoenix Coyotes: Eric Chouinard	
December 28, 2005	To Carolina Hurricanes: Krys Kolanos	To Phoenix Coyotes: Pavel Brendl	
January 20, 2006	To Philadelphia Flyers: Petr Nedved; Option to switch 4th-round picks in 2006 (Note: Option exercised.); Option to switch 3rd-round picks in 2007 (Note: Option not exercised.)	To Phoenix Coyotes: Dennis Seidenberg	
January 24, 2006	To New York Rangers: Martin Sonnenberg	To Phoenix Coyotes: Jeff Taffe	
February 1, 2006	To Calgary Flames: Brian Boucher; Mike Leclerc	To Phoenix Coyotes: Steven Reinprecht; Philippe Sauve	
February 3, 2006	To Washington Capitals: Doug Doull	To Phoenix Coyotes: Dwayne Zinger	
March 9, 2006	To Philadelphia Flyers: Denis Gauthier	To Phoenix Coyotes: Josh Gratton; Florida’s 2nd-round pick in 2006; Tampa Bay’s 2nd-round pick in 2006	
March 9, 2006	To Anaheim Mighty Ducks: Sean O'Donnell	To Phoenix Coyotes: Joel Perrault	
March 9, 2006	To Detroit Red Wings: 7th-round pick in 2006	To Phoenix Coyotes: Jamie Rivers	
March 9, 2006	To Los Angeles Kings: Tim Jackman	To Phoenix Coyotes: Yanick Lehoux	
March 9, 2006	To New York Islanders: 3rd-round pick in 2006	To Phoenix Coyotes: Oleg Kvasha; Conditional 5th-round pick in 2006 (Note: Phoenix would receive the pick if they did not re-sign Kvasha.)	
March 9, 2006	To Calgary Flames: Jamie Lundmark	To Phoenix Coyotes: 4th-round pick in 2006	

=== Players acquired ===
Date	Player	Former team	Term	Via	Ref
August 11, 2005	Chris McAllister	Newcastle Vipers (BNL)		Free agency	
August 17, 2005	Curtis Joseph	Detroit Red Wings	1-year	Free agency	
August 19, 2005	Steve Passmore	Adler Mannheim (DEL)	1-year	Free agency	
September 19, 2005	Mike Bishai	Edmonton Oilers		Free agency	
November 4, 2005	Steve Gainey	San Antonio Rampage (AHL)	1-year	Free agency	
November 5, 2005	Yanick Lehoux	Los Angeles Kings		Waivers	
December 19, 2005	Krys Kolanos	Edmonton Oilers		Waivers	
December 29, 2005	Vladimir Orszagh	Lulea HF (SHL)	2-year	Free agency	
March 27, 2006	Bill Thomas	University of Nebraska Omaha (CCHA)		Free agency	
May 5, 2006	Patrick Fischer	EV Zug (NLA)	multi-year	Free agency	

=== Players lost ===
Date	Player	New team	Via (Note: In parentheses is the player's free agency group on August 1 if applicable.)	Ref
July 29, 2005	Brian Savage	Philadelphia Flyers (Note: Savage signed with Philadelphia on September 15.)	Compliance buyout	
August 1, 2005	Andrei Nazarov	Minnesota Wild	Free agency (III)	
August 2, 2005	Jon Sim	Philadelphia Flyers	Free agency	
August 19, 2005	Jean-Marc Pelletier	Florida Panthers	Free agency (VI)	
September 1, 2005	Brent Johnson	Vancouver Canucks	Free agency (UFA)	
September 7, 2005	Mike Stutzel	Idaho Steelheads (ECHL)	Free agency (UFA)	
October 4, 2005	Daniel Cleary	Detroit Red Wings	Free agency (UFA)	
October 15, 2005	Brett Hull		Retirement	
October 22, 2005	Nikos Tselios	KalPa (Liiga)	Free agency (VI)	
November 11, 2005	Krys Kolanos	Edmonton Oilers	Waivers	
November 25, 2005	Yanick Lehoux	Los Angeles Kings	Waivers	
December 30, 2005	Vladimir Orszagh	St. Louis Blues	Waivers	
May 4, 2006	Pavel Brendl	Mora IK (SHL)	Free agency (Note: Phoenix retained Brendl's NHL rights through the 2007–08 season.)	
May 11, 2006	Steve Passmore	EC Graz 99ers (EBEL)	Free agency	
June 6, 2006	Sheldon Keefe		Retirement (Note: Keefe assumed the roles of general manager and head coach of the junior hockey team he owned, the Pembroke Lumber Kings.)	

=== Signings ===
Date	Player	Term	Contract type	Ref
August 2, 2005	Brian Boucher	1-year	Re-signing	
August 3, 2005	Matt Jones	2-year	Entry-level	
August 5, 2005	Brad Ference	1-year	Re-signing	
August 11, 2005	Derek Morris	1-year	Re-signing	
August 15, 2005	Krys Kolanos	1-year	Re-signing	
August 15, 2005	Jeff Taffe	1-year	Re-signing	
August 22, 2005	Paul Mara	1-year	Re-signing	
September 19, 2005	Sheldon Keefe		Re-signing	
March 8, 2006	Derek Morris	3-year	Extension	
March 8, 2006	Steven Reinprecht	3-year	Extension	
March 31, 2006	Daniel Winnik		Entry-level	
April 15, 2006	Zbynek Michalek	4-year	Extension	
May 5, 2006	Keith Yandle		Entry-level	
May 12, 2006	Kevin Cormier		Entry-level	
May 26, 2006	Curtis Joseph	1-year	Re-signing	
June 1, 2006	Enver Lisin		Entry-level	
June 1, 2006	Logan Stephenson		Entry-level	

== Draft picks ==
Phoenix's draft picks at the 2005 NHL entry draft held at the Westin Hotel in Ottawa, Ontario.

Round	#	Player	Nationality	College/Junior/Club team
1	17	Martin Hanzal (C)	Czech Republic	Ceske Budejovice (Czech Republic)
2	59	Pier-Olivier Pelletier (G)	Canada	Drummondville Voltigeurs (QMJHL)
4	105	Keith Yandle (D)	United States	Cushing Academy (USHS-MA)
5	148	Anton Krysanov (C)	Russia	Lada Togliatti (Russia)
7	212	Pat Brosnihan (RW)	United States	Worcester Academy (USHS-MA)

== Farm teams ==
- San Antonio Rampage, American Hockey League
