= 2005–06 Vancouver Canucks season =

NHL hockey team season

2005–06 Vancouver Canucks
- Division: 4th Northwest
- Conference: 9th Western
- 2005–06 record: 42–32–8
- Home record: 25–10–6
- Road record: 17–22–2
- Goals for: 256
- Goals against: 255

Team information
- General manager: Dave Nonis
- Coach: Marc Crawford
- Captain: Markus Naslund
- Alternate captains: Todd Bertuzzi; Ed Jovanovski; Trevor Linden; Brendan Morrison
- Arena: General Motors Place
- Average attendance: 18,630
- Minor league affiliates: Manitoba Moose; Columbia Inferno

Team leaders
- Goals: Anson Carter (33)
- Assists: Henrik Sedin (57)
- Points: Markus Naslund (79)
- Penalty minutes: Jarkko Ruutu (142)
- Plus/minus: Nolan Baumgartner (+11); Henrik Sedin (+11)
- Wins: Alex Auld (33)
- Goals against average: Alex Auld (2.94)

The 2005–06 Vancouver Canucks season was the Canucks' 36th NHL season.

In the first season after the lockout, the Canucks were expected to fare as well, if not better, than the previous season, where they captured the Northwest Division title. However, as the season went along, several key players were hampered by injuries and the team failed to meet expectations, ultimately missing the playoffs. As a result, coach Marc Crawford was fired, and the team underwent numerous changes over the summer.

== Regular season ==
=== Final standings ===
Northwest Division
No.	CR		GP	W	L	OTL	GF	GA	Pts
1	3	**Calgary Flames**	82	46	25	11	218	200	103
2	7	**Colorado Avalanche**	82	43	30	9	283	257	95
3	8	**Edmonton Oilers**	82	41	28	13	256	251	95
4	9	Vancouver Canucks	82	42	32	8	256	255	92
5	11	Minnesota Wild	82	38	36	8	231	215	84

Note: CR = Conference rank; GP = Games played; W = Wins; L = Losses; T = Ties; OTL = Overtime loss; GF = Goals for; GA = Goals against; Pts = Points
Bolded teams qualified for the playoffs.

Western Conference
R		Div	GP	W	L	OTL	GF	GA	Pts
**1**	**P-** Detroit Red Wings	**CE**	**82**	**58**	**16**	**8**	**305**	**209**	124
**2**	**Y-** Dallas Stars	**PA**	**82**	**53**	**23**	**6**	**265**	**218**	112
**3**	**Y-** Calgary Flames	**NW**	**82**	**46**	**25**	**11**	**218**	**200**	103
**4**	**X-** Nashville Predators	**CE**	**82**	**49**	**25**	**8**	**259**	**227**	106
**5**	**X-** San Jose Sharks	**PA**	**82**	**44**	**27**	**11**	**266**	**242**	99
**6**	**X-** Mighty Ducks of Anaheim	**PA**	**82**	**43**	**27**	**12**	**254**	**229**	98
**7**	**X-** Colorado Avalanche	**NW**	**82**	**43**	**30**	**9**	**283**	**257**	95
**8**	**X-** Edmonton Oilers	**NW**	**82**	**41**	**28**	**13**	**256**	**251**	95
8.5
9	Vancouver Canucks	NW	82	42	32	8	256	255	92
10	Los Angeles Kings	PA	82	42	35	5	249	270	89
11	Minnesota Wild	NW	82	38	36	8	231	215	84
12	Phoenix Coyotes	PA	82	38	39	5	246	271	81
13	Columbus Blue Jackets	CE	82	35	43	4	223	279	74
14	Chicago Blackhawks	CE	82	26	43	13	211	285	65
15	St. Louis Blues	CE	82	21	46	15	197	292	57

Divisions: CE – Central, PA – Pacific, NW – Northwest

P – Clinched Presidents Trophy; Y – Clinched division; X – Clinched playoff spot

== Schedule and results ==
2005–06 regular season
October: 8–2–2 (home: 5–0–0; road: 3–2–2)

Game	Date	Visitor	Score	Home	OT	Decision	Attendance	Record	Pts	Recap
1	October 5	Phoenix	2 – 3	Vancouver		Cloutier	18,630	1–0–0	2	W
2	October 8	Vancouver	3 – 4	Edmonton	SO	Cloutier	16,839	1–0–1	3	OTL
3	October 10	Vancouver	4 – 2	Detroit		Auld	20,066	2–0–1	5	W
4	October 12	Vancouver	0 – 6	Minnesota		Cloutier	18,568	2–1–1	5	L
5	October 14	Vancouver	5 – 3	Minnesota		Cloutier	18,568	3–1–1	7	W
6	October 16	Dallas	2 – 5	Vancouver		Auld	18,630	4–1–1	9	W
7	October 18	Chicago	2 – 6	Vancouver		Cloutier	18,630	5–1–1	11	W
8	October 20	Phoenix	2 – 3	Vancouver		Cloutier	18,630	6–1–1	13	W
9	October 22	Colorado	4 – 6	Vancouver		Cloutier	18,630	7–1–1	15	W
10	October 25	Vancouver	3 – 1	Minnesota		Auld	18,568	8–1–1	17	W
11	October 27	Vancouver	2 – 6	Colorado		Cloutier	18,007	8–2–1	17	L
12	October 29	Vancouver	3 – 4	Colorado	OT	Auld	18,007	8–2–2	18	OTL

November: 8–6–0 (home: 6–1–0; road: 2–5–0)

Game	Date	Visitor	Score	Home	OT	Decision	Attendance	Record	Pts	Recap
13	November 2	Minnesota	1 – 2	Vancouver		Auld	18,630	9–2–2	20	W
14	November 4	Columbus	3 – 5	Vancouver		Auld	18,630	10–2–2	22	W
15	November 5	Vancouver	0 – 1	Calgary		Auld	19,289	10–3–2	22	L
16	November 7	Vancouver	3 – 4	Calgary		Auld	19,289	10–4–2	22	L
17	November 10	Colorado	5 – 3	Vancouver		Auld	18,630	10–5–2	22	L
18	November 13	Detroit	1 – 4	Vancouver		Cloutier	18,630	11–5–2	24	W
19	November 16	Vancouver	3 – 1	San Jose		Cloutier	17,139	12–5–2	26	W
20	November 17	Vancouver	4 – 5	Los Angeles		Cloutier	18,118	12–6–2	26	L
21	November 20	Vancouver	3 – 2	Anaheim		Cloutier	14,149	13–6–2	28	W
22	November 22	Chicago	1 – 3	Vancouver		Auld	18,630	14–6–2	30	W
23	November 24	San Jose	2 – 3	Vancouver		Auld	18,630	15–6–2	32	W
24	November 26	Vancouver	1 – 2	Phoenix		Auld	18,095	15–7–2	32	L
25	November 27	Vancouver	2 – 6	Colorado		Auld	18,007	15–8–2	32	L
26	November 30	Colorado	2 – 5	Vancouver		Auld	18,630	16–8–2	34	W

December: 5–4–3 (home: 3–2–3; road: 2–2–0)

Game	Date	Visitor	Score	Home	OT	Decision	Attendance	Record	Pts	Recap
27	December 1	Vancouver	3 – 5	Edmonton		Auld	16,839	16–9–2	34	L
28	December 4	Boston	2 – 5	Vancouver		Auld	18,630	17–9–2	36	W
29	December 9	Ottawa	2 – 3	Vancouver	SO	Auld	18,630	18–9–2	38	W
30	December 13	Vancouver	3 – 2	Rangers		Auld	18,200	19–9–2	40	W
31	December 15	Vancouver	5 – 4	Philadelphia		Auld	19,549	20–9–2	42	W
32	December 17	Edmonton	5 – 4	Vancouver	OT	Ouellet	18,630	20–9–3	43	OTL
33	December 19	Los Angeles	4 – 3	Vancouver	SO	Auld	18,630	20–9–4	44	OTL
34	December 21	Edmonton	7 – 6	Vancouver		Auld	18,630	20–10–4	44	L
35	December 23	Calgary	6 – 5	Vancouver	SO	Auld	18,630	20–10–5	45	OTL
36	December 26	Calgary	2 – 1	Vancouver		Auld	18,630	20–11–5	45	L
37	December 28	Nashville	3 – 4	Vancouver		Auld	18,630	21–11–5	47	W
38	December 31	Vancouver	3 – 4	Minnesota		Ouellet	18,568	21–12–5	47	L

January: 9–6–0 (home: 4–0–0; road: 5–6–0)

Game	Date	Visitor	Score	Home	OT	Decision	Attendance	Record	Pts	Recap
39	January 2	Vancouver	1 – 4	St. Louis		Auld	14,230	21–13–5	47	L
40	January 4	Vancouver	1 – 3	Dallas		Auld	17,227	21–14–5	47	L
41	January 5	Vancouver	3 – 2	Chicago		Auld	11,125	22–14–5	49	W
42	January 7	Calgary	3 – 4	Vancouver	OT	Auld	18,630	23–14–5	51	W
43	January 10	Toronto	3 – 4	Vancouver		Auld	18,630	24–14–5	53	W
44	January 13	Vancouver	0 – 3	New Jersey		Auld	15,061	24–15–5	53	L
45	January 14	Vancouver	8 – 1	Islanders		Auld	14,205	25–15–5	55	W
46	January 16	Vancouver	4 – 2	Pittsburgh		Auld	15,681	26–15–5	57	W
47	January 19	Buffalo	1 – 4	Vancouver		Auld	18,630	27–15–5	59	W
48	January 21	Montreal	2 – 6	Vancouver		Auld	18,630	28–15–5	61	W
49	January 23	Vancouver	0 – 4	St. Louis		Ouellet	13,138	28–16–5	61	L
50	January 24	Vancouver	5 – 6	Columbus		Auld	16,192	28–17–5	61	L
51	January 26	Vancouver	1 – 2	Detroit		Auld	20,066	28–18–5	61	L
52	January 28	Vancouver	4 – 3	Colorado	SO	Auld	18,007	29–18–5	63	W
53	January 31	Vancouver	7 – 4	Phoenix		Auld	14,599	30–18–5	65	W

February: 4–3–0 (home: 2–2–0; road: 2–1–0)

Game	Date	Visitor	Score	Home	OT	Decision	Attendance	Record	Pts	Recap
54	February 3	Vancouver	3 – 1	Calgary		Auld	19,289	31–18–5	67	W
55	February 4	Vancouver	1 – 3	Edmonton		Auld	16,839	31–19–5	67	L
56	February 6	Columbus	4 – 7	Vancouver		Auld	18,630	32–19–5	69	W
57	February 8	St. Louis	4 – 2	Vancouver		Auld	18,630	32–20–5	69	L
58	February 10	Anaheim	3 – 1	Vancouver		Auld	18,630	32–21–5	69	L
59	February 12	Minnesota	2 – 3	Vancouver	OT	Auld	18,630	33–21–5	71	W
60	February 28	Vancouver	2 – 1	Calgary		Auld	19,289	34–21–5	73	W

March: 6–7–2 (home: 3–3–2; road: 3–4–0)

Game	Date	Visitor	Score	Home	OT	Decision	Attendance	Record	Pts	Recap
61	March 2	Vancouver	1 – 3	Nashville		Auld	13,228	34–22–5	73	L
62	March 3	Vancouver	5 – 4	Chicago	SO	Auld	11,579	35–22–5	75	W
63	March 5	St. Louis	4 – 1	Vancouver		Auld	18,630	35–23–5	75	L
64	March 9	Nashville	3 – 2	Vancouver	OT	Auld	18,630	35–23–6	76	OTL
65	March 11	Dallas	2 – 1	Vancouver		Auld	18,630	35–24–6	76	L
66	March 13	Vancouver	2 – 4	Dallas		Auld	18,584	35–25–6	76	L
67	March 14	Vancouver	0 – 5	Nashville		Noronen	13,353	35–26–6	76	L
68	March 17	Vancouver	3 – 2	Columbus		Auld	16,163	36–26–6	78	W
69	March 19	Detroit	7 – 3	Vancouver		Auld	18,630	36–27–6	78	L
70	March 21	Vancouver	4 – 1	Edmonton		Auld	16,839	37–27–6	80	W
71	March 23	Edmonton	3 – 4	Vancouver	SO	Auld	18,630	38–27–6	82	W
72	March 25	Vancouver	2 – 3	Edmonton		Auld	16,839	38–28–6	82	L
73	March 27	Los Angeles	4 – 7	Vancouver		Auld	18,630	39–28–6	84	W
74	March 29	Minnesota	1 – 2	Vancouver		Auld	18,630	40–28–6	86	W
75	March 31	Minnesota	2 – 1	Vancouver	SO	Auld	18,630	40–28–7	87	OTL

April: 2–4–1 (home: 2–1–1; road: 0–3–0)

Game	Date	Visitor	Score	Home	OT	Decision	Attendance	Record	Pts	Recap
76	April 2	Vancouver	2 – 6	Anaheim		Auld	17,174	40–29–7	87	L
77	April 3	Vancouver	0 – 1	Los Angeles		Auld	17,196	40–30–7	87	L
78	April 8	Calgary	2 – 3	Vancouver	OT	Auld	18,630	41–30–7	89	W
79	April 10	Anaheim	4 – 2	Vancouver		Auld	18,630	41–31–7	89	L
80	April 12	San Jose	3 – 2	Vancouver	OT	Auld	18,630	41–31–8	90	OTL
81	April 13	Vancouver	3 – 5	San Jose		Auld	17,496	41–32–8	90	L
82	April 15	Colorado	3 – 4	Vancouver	OT	Noronen	18,630	42–32–8	92	W

Legend: W Win (2 points) L Loss (0 points) OTL Overtime/shootout loss (1 point)

== Player statistics ==
=== Scoring ===
- Position abbreviations: C = Centre; D = Defence; G = Goaltender; LW = Left wing; RW = Right wing
- † = Joined team via a transaction (e.g., trade, waivers, signing) during the season. Stats reflect time with the Canucks only.
- ‡ = Left team via a transaction (e.g., trade, waivers, release) during the season. Stats reflect time with the Canucks only.

No.	Player	Pos	Regular season					
No.	Player	Pos	GP	G	A	Pts	+/-	PIM
19	Markus Naslund	LW	81	32	47	79	−19	66
33	Henrik Sedin	C	82	18	57	75	11	56
44	Todd Bertuzzi	RW	82	25	46	71	−17	120
22	Daniel Sedin	LW	82	22	49	71	7	34
7	Brendan Morrison	C	82	19	37	56	−1	84
77	Anson Carter	RW	81	33	22	55	−1	41
4	Nolan Baumgartner	D	70	5	29	34	11	30
2	Mattias Ohlund	D	78	13	20	33	−6	92
6	Sami Salo	D	59	10	23	33	9	38
55	Ed Jovanovski	D	44	8	25	33	−8	58
20	Ryan Kesler	C	82	10	13	23	1	79
18	Richard Park	C	60	8	10	18	−2	29
24	Matt Cooke	LW	45	8	10	18	−8	71
37	Jarkko Ruutu	RW	82	10	7	17	1	142
5	Bryan Allen	D	77	7	10	17	4	115
16	Trevor Linden	C	82	7	9	16	3	15
14	Alexandre Burrows†	LW	43	7	5	12	5	61
36	Josh Green	LW	33	4	2	6	2	14
26	Steve McCarthy‡	D	51	2	4	6	3	43
25	Kevin Bieksa	D	39	0	6	6	−1	77
28	Wade Brookbank	D	32	1	2	3	3	81
27	Lee Goren	RW	28	1	2	3	−6	30
21	Tyler Bouck	RW	12	1	1	2	0	21
35	Alex Auld	G	67	0	2	2		4
3	Keith Carney†	D	18	0	2	2	−5	14
15	Rick Rypien†	C	5	1	0	1	1	4
45	Tomas Mojzis‡	D	7	0	1	1	2	12
8	Jozef Balej†	RW	1	0	1	1	1	0
8	Eric Weinrich†	D	16	0	0	0	−13	8
39	Dan Cloutier	G	13	0	0	0		4
23	Sean Brown†	D	12	0	0	0	−3	8
52	Sven Butenschon	D	8	0	0	0	1	0
31	Mika Noronen†	G	4	0	0	0		0
1	Maxime Ouellet†	G	4	0	0	0		2
34	Rob McVicar	G	1	0	0	0		0
41	Prestin Ryan	D	1	0	0	0	−1	2
29	Nathan Smith	C	1	0	0	0	0	0

=== Goaltending ===
- † = Joined team via a transaction (e.g., trade, waivers, signing) during the season. Stats reflect time with the Canucks only.

No.	Player	Regular season									
No.	Player	GP	W	L	OT	SA	GA	GAA	SV%	SO	TOI
35	Alex Auld	67	33	26	6	1938	189	2.94	.902	0	3859
39	Dan Cloutier	13	8	3	1	334	36	3.17	.892	0	681
31	Mika Noronen†	4	1	1	0	77	10	3.53	.870	0	170
1	Maxime Ouellet†	4	0	2	1	113	12	3.24	.894	0	222
34	Rob McVicar	1	0	0	0	0	0	0.00		0	3

== Awards and records ==
=== Awards ===
Type	Award/honour	Recipient	Ref
League (in-season)	NHL Offensive Player of the Week	Henrik Sedin (February 6)	
Team	Babe Pratt Trophy	Mattias Ohlund	
Team	Cyclone Taylor Trophy	Alex Auld	
Team	Cyrus H. McLean Trophy	Markus Naslund	
Team	Fred J. Hume Award	Jarkko Ruutu	
Team	Molson Cup	Alex Auld	
Team	Most Exciting Player Award	Anson Carter	

=== Milestones ===
Milestone	Player	Date	Ref
750th game coached	Marc Crawford	October 22, 2005	
First game	Rob McVicar	December 1, 2005	
First game	Kevin Bieksa	December 19, 2005	
First game	Rick Rypien	December 21, 2005	
First game	Alex Burrows	January 2, 2006	
First game	Tomas Mojzis	February 4, 2006	
First game	Prestin Ryan	February 8, 2006	

== Transactions ==
The Canucks were involved in the following transactions from February 17, 2005, the day after the 2004–05 NHL season was officially cancelled, through June 19, 2006, the day of the deciding game of the 2006 Stanley Cup Finals.

=== Trades ===
Date	Details		Ref
August 1, 2005 (Note: Compensation due to Anaheim hiring Randy Carlyle as their head coach.)	To Anaheim Mighty Ducks: 3rd-round pick in 2008	To Vancouver Canucks: 3rd-round pick in 2006; 2nd-round pick in 2007	
August 3, 2005	To New York Islanders: Brent Sopel	To Vancouver Canucks: Conditional 2nd-round pick in 2006 (Note: If the Islanders re-signed Sopel beyond the 2005–06 season, the Canucks would receive a 2nd-round pick. If not, the Canucks would receive a 3rd-round pick instead.)	
August 22, 2005	To Chicago Blackhawks: 3rd-round pick in 2007	To Vancouver Canucks: Steve McCarthy	
September 9, 2005	To Tampa Bay Lightning: Future considerations	To Vancouver Canucks: Craig Darby	
October 7, 2005	To New York Rangers: Fedor Fedorov	To Vancouver Canucks: Jozef Balej; Conditional 5th-round pick in 2006	
December 2, 2005	To Washington Capitals: 5th-round pick in 2006	To Vancouver Canucks: Maxime Ouellet	
March 9, 2006	To New Jersey Devils: 4th-round pick in 2006	To Vancouver Canucks: Sean Brown	
March 9, 2006	To Buffalo Sabres: 2nd-round pick in 2006	To Vancouver Canucks: Mika Noronen	
March 9, 2006	To Anaheim Mighty Ducks: Brett Skinner; 2nd-round pick in 2006	To Vancouver Canucks: Keith Carney; Rights to Juha Alen	
March 9, 2006	To St. Louis Blues: Tomas Mojzis; 3rd-round pick in 2006	To Vancouver Canucks: Eric Weinrich	
March 9, 2006	To Atlanta Thrashers: Steve McCarthy	To Vancouver Canucks: Conditional 4th-round pick in 2007 (Note: The pick would upgrade to a third-rounder if Atlanta re-signed McCarthy. Vancouver traded this pick back to Atlanta on June 14.)	
June 14, 2006	To Atlanta Thrashers: Atlanta's 4th-round pick in 2007	To Vancouver Canucks: Tommi Santala; 5th-round pick in 2007	

=== Players acquired ===
Date	Player	Former team	Term	Via	Ref
August 9, 2005	Richard Park	Minnesota Wild	1-year	Free agency	
August 17, 2005	Anson Carter	Los Angeles Kings	1-year	Free agency	
August 22, 2005	Sven Butenschon	New York Islanders		Free agency	
August 23, 2005	Josh Green	Manitoba Moose (AHL)		Free agency	
August 30, 2005	Prestin Ryan	Columbus Blue Jackets		Free agency	
September 1, 2005	Brent Johnson	Phoenix Coyotes	1-year	Free agency	
October 26, 2005	Jason Doig	Washington Capitals		Free agency	
November 9, 2005	Alex Burrows	Manitoba Moose (AHL)		Free agency	
November 9, 2005	Rick Rypien	Manitoba Moose (AHL)		Free agency	
June 19, 2006	Brad Moran	SCL Tigers (NLA)		Free agency	

=== Players lost ===
Date	Player	New team	Via (Note: In parentheses is the player's free agency group on August 1 if applicable.)	Ref
August 2, 2005	Marek Malik	New York Rangers	Free agency (V)	
August 2, 2005	Tim Smith	EHC Freiburg (ESBG)	Free agency (UFA)	
August 5, 2005	Brad May	Colorado Avalanche	Free agency (III)	
August 11, 2005	Joe DiPenta	Anaheim Mighty Ducks	Free agency (VI)	
August 16, 2005	Johnathan Aitken	Montreal Canadiens	Free agency (UFA)	
August 22, 2005	Peter Sarno	Columbus Blue Jackets	Free agency (VI)	
August 26, 2005	Jeff Heerema	Ottawa Senators	Free agency (VI)	
October 4, 2005	Brent Johnson	Washington Capitals	Waivers	
October 19, 2005	Justin Morrison	Chicago Wolves (AHL)	Free agency (VI)	
June 12, 2006	Brandon Nolan	Vaxjo Lakers (Allsvenskan)	Free agency	
June 19, 2006	Sven Butenschon	Adler Mannheim (DEL)	Free agency	

=== Signings ===
Date	Player	Term	Contract type	Ref
July 27, 2005	Marc-Andre Bernier	3-year	Entry-level	
July 27, 2005	Francois-Pierre Guenette		Entry-level	
July 27, 2005	Nathan McIver		Entry-level	
July 28, 2005	Wade Brookbank	1-year	Option exercised	
July 28, 2005	Wade Flaherty	1-year	Option exercised	
July 28, 2005	Lee Goren	1-year	Option exercised	
August 3, 2005	Markus Naslund	3-year	Re-signing	
August 5, 2005	Brendan Morrison	3-year	Re-signing	
August 10, 2005	Daniel Sedin	1-year	Re-signing	
August 10, 2005	Henrik Sedin	1-year	Re-signing	
August 11, 2005	Tyler Bouck	1-year	Re-signing	
August 15, 2005	Bryan Allen		Re-signing	
August 15, 2005	Sami Salo	2-year	Re-signing	
August 16, 2005	Jason King		Re-signing	
August 18, 2005	Dan Cloutier	2-year	Re-signing	
August 24, 2005	Mattias Ohlund	4-year	Re-signing	
August 30, 2005	Mike Brown		Entry-level	
August 30, 2005	Brett Skinner	2-year	Entry-level	
September 1, 2005	Jarkko Ruutu	1-year	Re-signing	
September 21, 2005	Matt Cooke	3-year	Re-signing	
September 28, 2005	Nathan Smith		Re-signing	
May 4, 2006	Luc Bourdon	3-year	Entry-level	
May 29, 2006	Julien Ellis		Entry-level	
June 19, 2006	Brandon Reid		Re-signing	

== Draft picks ==
Vancouver's picks at the 2005 NHL entry draft in Ottawa, Ontario.

Round	#	Player	Nationality	College/Junior/Club team (League)
1	10	Luc Bourdon (D)	Canada	Val-d'Or Foreurs (QMJHL)
2	51	Mason Raymond (LW)	Canada	Camrose Kodiaks (AJHL)
4	114	Alexandre Vincent (G)	Canada	Chicoutimi Saguenéens (QMJHL)
5	138	Matt Butcher (C)	United States	Chilliwack Chiefs (BCHL)
6	185	Kris Fredheim (D)	Canada	Notre Dame Hounds (SJHL)
7	205	Mario Bliznak (C)	Slovakia	HK Spartak Dubnica (Svk.)

== Farm teams ==
=== Manitoba Moose ===
AHL affiliate that is based in Winnipeg, Manitoba and their home arena is the MTS Centre. The team has been affiliated with the Vancouver Canucks since 2000.

=== Columbia Inferno ===
ECHL affiliate that is based in Columbia, South Carolina and their home arena is the Carolina Coliseum. The team has been affiliated with the Vancouver Canucks since 2001.
