= 2005–06 Calgary Flames season =

NHL team season

2005–06 Calgary Flames
- Northwest Division champions
- Division: 1st Northwest
- Conference: 3rd Western
- 2005–06 record: 46–25–11
- Home record: 30–7–4
- Road record: 16–18–7
- Goals for: 218
- Goals against: 200

Team information
- General manager: Darryl Sutter
- Coach: Darryl Sutter
- Captain: Jarome Iginla
- Alternate captains: Robyn Regehr; Rhett Warrener
- Arena: Pengrowth Saddledome
- Average attendance: 19,289
- Minor league affiliates: Omaha Ak-Sar-Ben Knights; Las Vegas Wranglers

Team leaders
- Goals: Jarome Iginla (35)
- Assists: Daymond Langkow (34)
- Points: Jarome Iginla (67)
- Penalty minutes: Darren McCarty (117)
- Plus/minus: Marcus Nilson (+13)
- Wins: Miikka Kiprusoff (42)
- Goals against average: Miikka Kiprusoff (2.07)

Calgary Flames 25th anniversary logo

The 2005–06 Calgary Flames season was the team's 26th season in the National Hockey League (NHL) in Calgary while the team celebrated its 25th season of play.

During the off-season following the 2004–05 NHL lockout, Flames general manager Darryl Sutter announced that he would not re-sign free agent Martin Gelinas for the 2005–06 season. Instead, Sutter brought in three ageing veterans, Bryan Marchment, Tony Amonte and Darren McCarty, as free agent reclamation projects to start the season. Nonetheless, the season began with high expectations following Calgary's surprising run to the 2004 Stanley Cup Finals.

The season opened with a disappointing October, as the Flames started 4–7–2 before an eight-game November winning streak propelled Calgary back into contention in the Northwest Division. The Flames would battle the Colorado Avalanche down the stretch, ultimately finishing eight points ahead of both Colorado and the Edmonton Oilers to capture the team's sixth division crown in franchise history.

However, during the playoffs, Calgary was eliminated by the Mighty Ducks of Anaheim in the first round in seven games.

Star goaltender Miikka Kiprusoff led the NHL in shutouts and goals against average while setting a franchise record for wins with 42. His exploits would win him the Vezina Trophy and William M. Jennings Trophy, along with being named a First Team All-Star. Kiprusoff was also a finalist for the Hart Memorial Trophy.

Rookie phenom Dion Phaneuf earned a nomination for the Calder Memorial Trophy after his 20-goal campaign set a franchise record for goals by a rookie defenceman, and fell just three shy of Brian Leetch's NHL record of 23 set in 1988–89.

The Flames sold out all 45 home games in 2005–06 as 19,289 fans packed the Pengrowth Saddledome for every regular season and playoff game played in Calgary.

At the 2006 Winter Olympics, three Flames players represented their countries: Jarome Iginla and Robyn Regehr represented Canada, while Jordan Leopold represented the United States. Kiprusoff had also been named to the Finnish team, but declined to participate due to an injury.

== Regular season ==
The Flames finished first in the NHL in shutouts for with 10 and allowed the fewest goals in the NHL with 193 (excluding shootout goals allowed).

=== Season standings ===
Northwest Division
No.	CR		GP	W	L	OTL	GF	GA	Pts
1	3	**Calgary Flames**	82	46	25	11	218	200	103
2	7	**Colorado Avalanche**	82	43	30	9	283	257	95
3	8	**Edmonton Oilers**	82	41	28	13	256	251	95
4	9	Vancouver Canucks	82	42	32	8	256	255	92
5	11	Minnesota Wild	82	38	36	8	231	215	84

Note: CR = Conference rank; GP = Games played; W = Wins; L = Losses; T = Ties; OTL = Overtime loss; GF = Goals for; GA = Goals against; Pts = Points
Bolded teams qualified for the playoffs.

Western Conference
R		Div	GP	W	L	OTL	GF	GA	Pts
**1**	**P-** Detroit Red Wings	**CE**	**82**	**58**	**16**	**8**	**305**	**209**	124
**2**	**Y-** Dallas Stars	**PA**	**82**	**53**	**23**	**6**	**265**	**218**	112
**3**	**Y-** Calgary Flames	**NW**	**82**	**46**	**25**	**11**	**218**	**200**	103
**4**	**X-** Nashville Predators	**CE**	**82**	**49**	**25**	**8**	**259**	**227**	106
**5**	**X-** San Jose Sharks	**PA**	**82**	**44**	**27**	**11**	**266**	**242**	99
**6**	**X-** Mighty Ducks of Anaheim	**PA**	**82**	**43**	**27**	**12**	**254**	**229**	98
**7**	**X-** Colorado Avalanche	**NW**	**82**	**43**	**30**	**9**	**283**	**257**	95
**8**	**X-** Edmonton Oilers	**NW**	**82**	**41**	**28**	**13**	**256**	**251**	95
8.5
9	Vancouver Canucks	NW	82	42	32	8	256	255	92
10	Los Angeles Kings	PA	82	42	35	5	249	270	89
11	Minnesota Wild	NW	82	38	36	8	231	215	84
12	Phoenix Coyotes	PA	82	38	39	5	246	271	81
13	Columbus Blue Jackets	CE	82	35	43	4	223	279	74
14	Chicago Blackhawks	CE	82	26	43	13	211	285	65
15	St. Louis Blues	CE	82	21	46	15	197	292	57

Divisions: CE – Central, PA – Pacific, NW – Northwest

P – Clinched Presidents Trophy; Y – Clinched division; X – Clinched playoff spot

== Playoffs ==
The Flames entered the playoffs as the Northwest Division champions, and the third seed in the Western Conference. They met the Mighty Ducks of Anaheim in the first round in a hard-fought seven-game series. The goaltending of Ilya Bryzgalov would prove the turning point in the series after he replaced the ineffective starter Jean-Sebastien Giguere after game 3 and would stonewall the Flames for the rest of the series.

== Schedule and results ==
=== Regular season ===
2005–06 regular season
October: 4–7–2 (home: 2–1–1; road: 2–6–1)

Game	Date	Visitor	Score	Home	OT	Decision	Attendance	Record	Pts	Recap
1	October 5	Calgary	3 – 6	Minnesota		Kiprusoff	19,398	0–1–0	0	L
2	October 7	Calgary	3 – 1	Columbus		Kiprusoff	18,136	1–1–0	2	W
3	October 9	Calgary	3 – 6	Detroit		Kiprusoff	20,066	1–2–0	2	L
4	October 10	Calgary	3 – 7	Colorado		Kiprusoff	18,007	1–3–0	2	L
5	October 13	Dallas	3 – 2	Calgary	OT	Kiprusoff	19,289	1–3–1	3	OTL
6	October 15	Edmonton	0 – 3	Calgary		Kiprusoff	19,289	2–3–1	5	W
7	October 17	Phoenix	2 – 0	Calgary		Kiprusoff	19,289	2–4–1	5	L
8	October 20	Edmonton	1 – 3	Calgary		Kiprusoff	19,289	3–4–1	7	W
9	October 22	Calgary	1 – 2	Dallas		Kiprusoff	18,357	3–5–1	7	L
10	October 23	Calgary	3 – 2	Los Angeles		Kiprusoff	18,118	4–5–1	9	W
11	October 26	Calgary	1 – 4	Anaheim		Kiprusoff	11,774	4–6–1	9	L
12	October 27	Calgary	2 – 3	Phoenix		Sauve	13,459	4–7–1	9	L
13	October 29	Calgary	2 – 3	San Jose	SO	Kiprusoff	17,496	4–7–2	10	OTL

November: 10–2–1 (home: 8–1–1; road: 2–1–0)

Game	Date	Visitor	Score	Home	OT	Decision	Attendance	Record	Pts	Recap
14	November 1	Minnesota	0 – 3	Calgary		Kiprusoff	19,289	5–7–2	12	W
15	November 3	Columbus	1 – 2	Calgary		Kiprusoff	19,289	6–7–2	14	W
16	November 5	Vancouver	0 – 1	Calgary		Kiprusoff	19,289	7–7–2	16	W
17	November 7	Vancouver	3 – 4	Calgary		Kiprusoff	19,289	8–7–2	18	W
18	November 10	Calgary	4 – 3	Phoenix		Sauve	14,493	9–7–2	20	W
19	November 12	Colorado	3 – 5	Calgary		Kiprusoff	19,289	10–7–2	22	W
20	November 14	Minnesota	2 – 3	Calgary		Kiprusoff	19,289	11–7–2	24	W
21	November 16	Detroit	1 – 3	Calgary		Kiprusoff	19,289	12–7–2	26	W
22	November 18	Chicago	5 – 2	Calgary		Kiprusoff	19,289	12–8–2	26	L
23	November 21	Calgary	3 – 2	Colorado	SO	Sauve	18,007	13–8–2	28	W
24	November 23	San Jose	2 – 3	Calgary		Kiprusoff	19,289	14–8–2	30	W
25	November 25	Edmonton	2 – 1	Calgary	SO	Kiprusoff	19,289	14–8–3	31	OTL
26	November 29	Calgary	0 – 2	Nashville		Kiprusoff	12,797	14–9–3	31	L

December: 9–3–1 (home: 4–2–0; road: 5–1–1)

Game	Date	Visitor	Score	Home	OT	Decision	Attendance	Record	Pts	Recap
27	December 1	Calgary	3 – 2	Detroit		Kiprusoff	20,066	15–9–3	33	W
28	December 3	Calgary	3 – 2	Pittsburgh		Kiprusoff	16,626	16–9–3	35	W
29	December 6	Calgary	0 – 1	Philadelphia	SO	Kiprusoff	19,542	16–9–4	36	OTL
30	December 7	Calgary	4 – 1	New Jersey		Sauve	13,332	17–9–4	38	W
31	December 10	Ottawa	1 – 2	Calgary	OT	Kiprusoff	19,289	18–9–4	40	W
32	December 17	Boston	0 – 3	Calgary		Kiprusoff	19,289	19–9–4	42	W
33	December 19	Calgary	4 – 5	Edmonton		Kiprusoff	16,839	19–10–4	42	L
34	December 21	Los Angeles	5 – 2	Calgary		Kiprusoff	19,289	19–11–4	42	L
35	December 23	Calgary	6 – 5	Vancouver	SO	Kiprusoff	18,630	20–11–4	44	W
36	December 26	Calgary	2 – 1	Vancouver		Kiprusoff	18,630	21–11–4	46	W
37	December 27	Nashville	4 – 3	Calgary		Sauve	19,289	21–12–4	46	L
38	December 29	Minnesota	2 – 4	Calgary		Kiprusoff	19,289	22–12–4	48	W
39	December 31	Edmonton	5 – 6	Calgary		Kiprusoff	19,289	23–12–4	50	W

January: 7–4–2 (home: 4–0–0; road: 3–4–2)

Game	Date	Visitor	Score	Home	OT	Decision	Attendance	Record	Pts	Recap
40	January 2	Chicago	2 – 3	Calgary		Kiprusoff	19,289	24–12–4	52	W
41	January 6	Toronto	0 – 1	Calgary		Kiprusoff	19,289	25–12–4	54	W
42	January 7	Calgary	3 – 4	Vancouver	OT	Kiprusoff	18,630	25–12–5	55	OTL
43	January 10	Calgary	2 – 4	NY Rangers		Kiprusoff	18,200	25–13–5	55	L
44	January 12	Calgary	2 – 3	NY Islanders		Kiprusoff	10,315	25–14–5	55	L
45	January 14	Calgary	4 – 1	Minnesota		Kiprusoff	18,568	26–14–5	57	W
46	January 19	Montreal	2 – 3	Calgary		Kiprusoff	19,289	27–14–5	59	W
47	January 21	Buffalo	1 – 4	Calgary		Kiprusoff	19,289	28–14–5	61	W
48	January 23	Calgary	3 – 1	Edmonton		Kiprusoff	16,839	29–14–5	63	W
49	January 24	Calgary	4 – 7	Colorado		Sauve	18,007	29–15–5	63	L
50	January 26	Calgary	0 – 2	Chicago		Kiprusoff	10,486	29–16–5	63	L
51	January 29	Calgary	5 – 3	Chicago		Kiprusoff	15,748	30–16–5	65	W
52	January 30	Calgary	2 – 3	St. Louis	SO	Kiprusoff	13,310	30–16–6	66	OTL

February: 3–2–1 (home: 2–2–1; road: 1–0–0)

Game	Date	Visitor	Score	Home	OT	Decision	Attendance	Record	Pts	Recap
53	February 1	Columbus	2 – 1	Calgary	SO	Kiprusoff	19,289	30–16–7	67	OTL
54	February 3	Vancouver	3 – 1	Calgary		Kiprusoff	19,289	30–17–7	67	L
55	February 6	Calgary	4 – 3	San Jose		Kiprusoff	15,242	31–17–7	69	W
56	February 8	Anaheim	1 – 3	Calgary		Kiprusoff	19,289	32–17–7	71	W
57	February 10	St. Louis	2 – 3	Calgary	OT	Boucher	19,289	33–17–7	73	W
58	February 28	Vancouver	2 – 1	Calgary		Kiprusoff	19,289	33–18–7	73	L

March: 8–6–1 (home: 6–1–0; road: 2–5–1)

Game	Date	Visitor	Score	Home	OT	Decision	Attendance	Record	Pts	Recap
59	March 2	St. Louis	1 – 3	Calgary		Kiprusoff	19,289	34–18–7	75	W
60	March 4	San Jose	0 – 2	Calgary		Kiprusoff	19,289	35–18–7	77	W
61	March 7	Nashville	3 – 2	Calgary		Kiprusoff	19,289	35–19–7	77	L
62	March 9	Dallas	0 – 1	Calgary		Kiprusoff	19,289	36–19–7	79	W
63	March 12	Calgary	0 – 3	Colorado		Kiprusoff	18,007	36–20–7	79	L
64	March 13	Colorado	3 – 4	Calgary		Kiprusoff	19,289	37–20–7	81	W
65	March 16	Calgary	2 – 3	Edmonton	OT	Kiprusoff	16,839	37–20–8	82	OTL
66	March 18	Calgary	4 – 9	Nashville		Boucher	17,113	37–21–8	82	L
67	March 19	Calgary	3 – 2	Minnesota		Kiprusoff	18,568	38–21–8	84	W
68	March 21	Calgary	1 – 3	Minnesota		Kiprusoff	18,568	38–22–8	84	L
69	March 23	Calgary	7 – 2	St. Louis		Kiprusoff	14,706	39–22–8	86	W
70	March 24	Calgary	2 – 3	Columbus		Kiprusoff	17,041	39–23–8	86	L
71	March 26	Calgary	2 – 3	Dallas		Kiprusoff	18,584	39–24–8	86	L
72	March 29	Los Angeles	1 – 2	Calgary		Kiprusoff	19,289	40–24–8	88	W
73	March 31	Colorado	3 – 6	Calgary		Kiprusoff	19,289	41–24–8	90	W

April: 5–1–3 (home: 4–0–1; road: 1–1–2)

Game	Date	Visitor	Score	Home	OT	Decision	Attendance	Record	Pts	Recap
74	April 1	Calgary	4 – 1	Edmonton		Kiprusoff	16,839	42–24–8	92	W
75	April 3	Detroit	2 – 1	Calgary	SO	Kiprusoff	19,289	42–24–9	93	OTL
76	April 5	Phoenix	2 – 5	Calgary		Kiprusoff	19,289	43–24–9	95	W
77	April 7	Minnesota	1 – 2	Calgary		Kiprusoff	19,289	44–24–9	97	W
78	April 8	Calgary	2 – 3	Vancouver	OT	Kiprusoff	18,630	44–24–10	98	OTL
79	April 11	Anaheim	0 – 3	Calgary		Kiprusoff	19,289	45–24–10	100	W
80	April 13	Colorado	0 – 2	Calgary		Kiprusoff	19,289	46–24–10	102	W
81	April 15	Calgary	1 – 2	Los Angeles	SO	Kiprusoff	18,118	46–24–11	103	OTL
82	April 17	Calgary	3 – 4	Anaheim		Boucher	17,174	46–25–11	103	L

Legend: W Win (2 points) L Loss (0 points) OTL Overtime/shootout loss (1 point)

=== Playoffs ===
2006 Stanley Cup playoffs
Western Conference Quarterfinals vs. Anaheim (6) – Mighty Ducks win 4–3

Game	Date	Visitor	Score	Home	OT	Decision	Attendance	Series	Recap
1	April 21	Anaheim	1 – 2	Calgary	OT	Kiprusoff	19,289	Calgary leads 1–0	W
2	April 23	Anaheim	4 – 3	Calgary		Kiprusoff	19,289	Series tied 1–1	L
3	April 25	Calgary	5 – 2	Anaheim		Kiprusoff	17,174	Calgary leads 2–1	W
4	April 27	Calgary	2 – 3	Anaheim	OT	Kiprusoff	17,174	Series tied 2–2	L
5	April 29	Anaheim	2 – 3	Calgary		Kiprusoff	19,289	Calgary leads 3–2	W
6	May 1	Calgary	1 – 2	Anaheim		Kiprusoff	16,594	Series tied 3–3	L
7	May 3	Anaheim	3 – 0	Calgary		Kiprusoff	19,289	Anaheim wins 4–3	L

Legend: W Win L Loss

== Player statistics ==
=== Scoring ===
- Position abbreviations: C = Centre; D = Defence; G = Goaltender; LW = Left wing; RW = Right wing
- † = Joined team via a transaction (e.g., trade, waivers, signing) during the season. Stats reflect time with the Flames only.
- ‡ = Left team via a transaction (e.g., trade, waivers, release) during the season. Stats reflect time with the Flames only.

No.	Player	Pos	Regular season						Playoffs					
No.	Player	Pos	GP	G	A	Pts	+/-	PIM	GP	G	A	Pts	+/-	PIM
12	Jarome Iginla	RW	82	35	32	67	5	86	7	5	3	8	3	11
22	Daymond Langkow	C	82	25	34	59	2	46	7	1	5	6	4	6
3	Dion Phaneuf	D	82	20	29	49	5	93	7	1	0	1	−8	7
10	Tony Amonte	RW	80	14	28	42	3	43	7	2	1	3	2	10
20	Kristian Huselius†	LW	54	15	24	39	2	36	7	2	4	6	1	4
19	Chuck Kobasew	RW	77	20	11	31	−10	64	7	1	0	1	−3	0
21	Andrew Ference	D	82	4	27	31	−12	85	7	0	4	4	3	12
27	Steve Reinprecht‡	C	52	10	19	29	10	24	—	—	—	—	—	—
4	Roman Hamrlik	D	51	7	19	26	8	56	7	0	2	2	−7	2
28	Robyn Regehr	D	68	6	20	26	6	67	7	1	3	4	3	6
18	Matthew Lombardi	C	55	6	20	26	−1	67	7	0	2	2	−4	2
17	Chris Simon	LW	72	8	14	22	0	94	6	0	1	1	−3	7
16	Shean Donovan	RW	80	9	11	20	9	82	7	0	0	0	−2	6
6	Jordan Leopold	D	74	2	18	20	6	68	7	0	1	1	2	4
11	Stephane Yelle	C	74	4	14	18	10	48	7	1	0	1	−1	8
26	Marcus Nilson	LW	70	6	11	17	13	32	—	—	—	—	—	—
25	Darren McCarty	RW	67	7	6	13	−1	117	7	2	0	2	1	15
24	Jamie Lundmark†	C	12	4	6	10	2	20	4	0	1	1	0	7
15	Byron Ritchie	C	45	4	2	6	−2	69	7	0	0	0	−2	0
44	Rhett Warrener	D	61	3	3	6	7	54	7	0	0	0	4	14
29	Craig MacDonald	C	25	3	2	5	5	8	1	0	0	0	−1	0
27	Mike Leclerc†	LW	15	1	4	5	0	8	3	0	0	0	0	2
7	Bryan Marchment†	D	37	1	2	3	8	75	—	—	—	—	—	—
24	Jason Wiemer‡	LW	33	1	2	3	−3	65	—	—	—	—	—	—
34	Miikka Kiprusoff	G	74	0	2	2		10	7	0	0	0		2
49	Richie Regehr	D	14	0	2	2	0	6	—	—	—	—	—	—
5	Steve Montador‡	D	7	1	0	1	0	11	—	—	—	—	—	—
32	Cale Hulse†	D	12	0	1	1	1	20	—	—	—	—	—	—
46	Mark Giordano	D	7	0	1	1	2	8	—	—	—	—	—	—
30	Philippe Sauve‡	G	8	0	0	0		21	—	—	—	—	—	—
33	Brian Boucher†	G	3	0	0	0		0	—	—	—	—	—	—
23	Eric Nystrom	LW	2	0	0	0	−1	0	—	—	—	—	—	—
39	Carsen Germyn	C	2	0	0	0	−1	0	—	—	—	—	—	—
20	Lynn Loyns	LW	1	0	0	0	0	0	—	—	—	—	—	—

=== Goaltending ===
- † = Joined team via a transaction (e.g., trade, waivers, signing) during the season. Stats reflect time with the Flames only.
- ‡ = Left team via a transaction (e.g., trade, waivers, release) during the season. Stats reflect time with the Flames only.
- **Bold** text denotes league record. Italics denotes franchise record.

No.	Player	Regular season										Playoffs								
No.	Player	GP	W	L	OT	SA	GA	GAA	SV%	SO	TOI	GP	W	L	SA	GA	GAA	SV%	SO	TOI
34	Miikka Kiprusoff	74	42	20	11	1951	151	**2.07**	.923	**10**	4380	7	3	4	202	16	2.24	.921	0	428
30	Philippe Sauve‡	8	3	3	0	202	22	3.28	.891	0	402	–	–	–	–	–	–	–	–	–
33	Brian Boucher†	3	1	2	0	103	15	4.95	.854	0	182	–	–	–	–	–	–	–	–	–

== Awards and records ==
=== Awards ===
Type	Award/honour	Recipient	Ref
League (annual)	NHL All-Rookie Team	Dion Phaneuf (Defence)	
League (annual)	NHL First All-Star Team	Miikka Kiprusoff (Goaltender)	
League (annual)	Vezina Trophy	Miikka Kiprusoff	
League (annual)	William M. Jennings Trophy	Miikka Kiprusoff	
League (in-season)	NHL Defensive Player of the Week	Miikka Kiprusoff (November 7)	
League (in-season)	NHL Defensive Player of the Week	Miikka Kiprusoff (December 12)	
League (in-season)	NHL Defensive Player of the Week	Miikka Kiprusoff (April 17)	
League (in-season)	NHL Rookie of the Month	Dion Phaneuf (November)	
Team	J. R. "Bud" McCaig Award	Robyn Regehr	
Team	Molson Cup	Miikka Kiprusoff	
Team	Ralph T. Scurfield Humanitarian Award	Rhett Warrener	

=== Records achieved in the season ===
==== Flames team records ====
- Fewest home goals against in one season: (73)–previous record was 85 in the 2003–04 season
- Tied record for most shots for in one period: 3rd period, November 14, 2005, against the Minnesota Wild (25)
- Longest consecutive shutout minutes, for: April 8, 2006, 2:27 overtime at Vancouver Canucks; April 11 vs. Mighty Ducks of Anaheim to April 15, 3rd period at Los Angeles Kings (161:11)–previous record was 160:07 in the 2000–01 season
- Set a new record for fastest goal to start a period when Daymond Langkow scored five seconds into the third period against Anaheim on March 11.

==== Flames individual records ====
- Most wins in a season: Miikka Kiprusoff (42)–previous record was 39, held by Mike Vernon in the 1987–88 season
- Most shutouts in a season: Miikka Kiprusoff (10)–Four Flames were tied with the previous record of 5: Dan Bouchard, Phil Myre, Fred Brathwaite, & Roman Turek
- Most goals, rookie defenceman: Dion Phaneuf (20)–previous record was 18, held by Gary Suter in the 1985–86 season

=== Milestones ===
Milestone	Player	Date	Ref
First game	Dion Phaneuf	October 5, 2005	
First game	Eric Nystrom	October 10, 2005	
First game	Richie Regehr	December 29, 2005	
First game	Mark Giordano	January 30, 2006	
First game	Carsen Germyn	April 1, 2006	
400th goal	Tony Amonte	December 10, 2005	

== Transactions ==
The Flames were involved in the following transactions from February 17, 2005, the day after the 2004–05 NHL season was officially cancelled, through June 19, 2006, the day of the deciding game of the 2006 Stanley Cup Finals.

=== Trades ===
Date	Details		Ref
July 29, 2005	To Calgary Flames: 3rd-round pick in 2005	To Carolina Hurricanes: Mike Commodore	
July 30, 2005	To Calgary Flames: 3rd-round pick in 2005	To Buffalo Sabres: 3rd-round pick in 2005; 4th-round pick in 2005	
August 4, 2005	To Calgary Flames: Conditional draft pick in 2006	To Washington Capitals: Chris Clark	
August 9, 2005	To Calgary Flames: Philippe Sauve	To Colorado Avalanche: Conditional 7th-round pick in 2006 (Note: Condition not met.)	
August 25, 2005	To Calgary Flames: 3rd-round pick in 2006	To Buffalo Sabres: Toni Lydman	
December 2, 2005	To Calgary Flames: Kristian Huselius	To Florida Panthers: Dustin Johner; Steve Montador	
February 1, 2006	To Calgary Flames: Brian Boucher; Mike Leclerc	To Phoenix Coyotes: Steven Reinprecht; Philippe Sauve	
February 28, 2006	To Calgary Flames: Cale Hulse	To Columbus Blue Jackets: Cam Severson	
March 9, 2006	To Calgary Flames: Jamie Lundmark	To Phoenix Coyotes: 4th-round pick in 2006	
March 9, 2006	To Calgary Flames: Conditional 4th-round pick in 2006 (Note: Calgary would receive the later of New Jersey’s 4th-round pick or Vancouver’s 4th-round pick, which New Jersey had previously acquired. Calgary received New Jersey’s original 4th-rounder.)	To New Jersey Devils: Jason Wiemer	

=== Players acquired ===
Date	Player	Former team	Term	Via	Ref
July 31, 2005	Chris Neiszner	Red Deer Rebels (WHL)		Free agency	
August 2, 2005	Tony Amonte	Philadelphia Flyers	2-year	Free agency	
August 2, 2005	Darren McCarty	Detroit Red Wings	1-year	Free agency	
August 5, 2005	Derek Couture	Seattle Thunderbirds (WHL)		Free agency	
August 5, 2005	Steve Marr	Medicine Hat Tigers (WHL)		Free agency	
August 5, 2005	Brett Palin	Kelowna Rockets (WHL)		Free agency	
August 5, 2005	Warren Peters	Idaho Steelheads (ECHL)		Free agency	
August 11, 2005	Zenith Komarniski	Columbus Blue Jackets		Free agency	
August 11, 2005	Craig MacDonald	Lowell Lock Monsters (AHL)		Free agency	
August 11, 2005	Brantt Myhres	Lowell Lock Monsters (AHL)		Free agency	
August 11, 2005	Cam Severson	Nashville Predators		Free agency	
August 15, 2005	Roman Hamrlik	New York Islanders		Free agency	
October 11, 2005	Bryan Marchment	Toronto Maple Leafs	1-year	Free agency	

=== Players lost ===
Date	Player	New team	Via (Note: In parentheses is the player's free agency group on August 1 if applicable.)	Ref
August 2, 2005	Martin Gelinas	Florida Panthers	Free agency (III)	
August 4, 2005	Ville Nieminen	New York Rangers	Free agency (UFA)	
August 10, 2005	Roman Turek	HC Ceske Budejovice (ELH)	Retirement (Note: Turek retired from the NHL.)	
August 24, 2005	Sebastien Centomo	HIFK (Liiga)	Free agency (UFA)	
N/A	Deryk Engelland	Hershey Bears (AHL)	Free agency (UFA)	
September 28, 2005	Davis Parley	Bakersfield Condors (ECHL)	Free agency (UFA)	
September 30, 2005	Brennan Evans	Ottawa Senators	Free agency (UFA)	
November 21, 2005	Anders Eriksson	Springfield Falcons (AHL)	Free agency (UFA)	

=== Signings ===
Date	Player	Term	Contract type	Ref
July 28, 2005	Cam Cunning		Entry-level	
July 28, 2005	Ryan Donally		Entry-level	
July 28, 2005	Tyler Johnson		Entry-level	
August 3, 2005	Jarome Iginla	3-year	Re-signing	
August 4, 2005	Daymond Langkow	2-year	Re-signing	
August 4, 2005	Jordan Leopold	2-year	Re-signing	
August 11, 2005	Andrew Ference		Re-signing	
August 11, 2005	David Moss		Entry-level	
August 11, 2005	Steven Reinprecht		Re-signing	
August 12, 2005	Miikka Kiprusoff	multi-year	Re-signing	
August 12, 2005	Rhett Warrener	multi-year	Re-signing	
August 15, 2005	Chuck Kobasew		Re-signing	
August 15, 2005	Brent Krahn		Re-signing	
August 15, 2005	Matthew Lombardi		Re-signing	
August 15, 2005	Lynn Loyns		Re-signing	
August 15, 2005	Curtis McElhinney		Entry-level	
August 15, 2005	Eric Nystrom		Entry-level	
August 15, 2005	Brandon Prust		Entry-level	
September 17, 2005	Philippe Sauve		Re-signing	
March 27, 2006	Dustin Boyd		Entry-level	
May 10, 2006	Stephane Yelle		Re-signing	
May 12, 2006	Kris Chucko		Entry-level	
May 12, 2006	Adam Cracknell		Entry-level	
May 12, 2006	David Van der Gulik		Entry-level	
June 1, 2006	Aki Seitsonen		Entry-level	
June 6, 2006	Chuck Kobasew		Re-signing	
June 19, 2006	Kristian Huselius		Re-signing	

== Draft picks ==
Calgary's picks at the 2005 NHL entry draft. Due to the cancellation of the 2004–05 NHL season, the 2005 draft order was determined by a random draw, with each team gaining one to three "balls" based on recent performance. Each team started with three balls, and lost one for each time they made the post-season in the previous three years, with a minimum of one ball per team. The Flames had two balls in the lottery, however were very unlucky, ending up with the 26th overall pick.

Rnd	Pick	Player	Nationality	Position	Team (league)	NHL statistics				
Rnd	Pick	Player	Nationality	Position	Team (league)	GP	G	A	Pts	PIM
1	26	Matt Pelech	Canada	D	Sarnia Sting (OHL)	13	1	3	4	38
3	69	Gord Baldwin	Canada	D	Medicine Hat Tigers (WHL)					
3	74	Dan Ryder	Canada	C	Peterborough Petes (OHL)					
4	111	J. D. Watt	Canada	RW	Vancouver Giants (WHL)					
5	128	Kevin Lalande	Canada	G	Belleville Bulls (OHL)					
5	158	Matt Keetley	Canada	G	Medicine Hat Tigers (WHL)	1	0–0–0, 0.00 GAA, 1.000Sv%			
6	179	Brett Sutter	Canada	C/LW	Kootenay Ice (WHL)	60	2	8	10	40
7	221	Myles Rumsey	Canada	D	Swift Current Broncos (WHL)					

== Farm teams ==
=== Omaha Ak-Sar-Ben Knights ===
The Flames returned to having their own American Hockey League affiliate in 2005–06 with the debut of the Omaha Ak-Sar-Ben Knights in Omaha, Nebraska. This ended a two-year relationship with the Lowell Lockmonsters, whom the Flames shared the affiliation with the Carolina Hurricanes. 2005–06 marked the first season the Flames had a full affiliate since suspending the Saint John Flames franchise in 2003. The team is co-owned by the Calgary Flames, and the Knights of Ak-Sar-Ben, a philanthropist organization in Omaha.

The Knights had a disappointing inaugural season, finishing sixth in the Western Division, and out of the playoffs, with a record of 35–31–3–11. Carsen Germyn led the team in goals with 24, while Mark Giordano led in assists, 42, and points, 58. Brent Krahn led the way in goal with 26 wins, while both he and Curtis McElhinney finished with three shutouts each.

=== Las Vegas Wranglers ===
2005–06 marked the third season the ECHL's Las Vegas Wranglers were affiliated with the Flames. The Wranglers iced a strong team in 2005–06, setting franchise records for wins, 56, goals for, 267, and fewest goals against, 176. Despite their 56–13–6 record, the Wranglers only finished 2nd in the West Division, one point back of the Alaska Aces. Their point total of 112 was second best in the league, behind only the Aces. The Wranglers needed seven games to defeat the Idaho Steelheads in the West Division semi-finals before being knocked out of the playoffs by the eventual Kelly Cup champion Aces in five games.

== See also ==
- 2005–06 NHL season
