= 2005–06 Columbus Blue Jackets season =

National Hockey League season

2005–06 Columbus Blue Jackets
- Division: 3rd Central
- Conference: 13th Western
- 2005–06 record: 35–43–4
- Home record: 23–18–0
- Road record: 12–25–4
- Goals for: 223
- Goals against: 279

Team information
- General manager: Doug MacLean
- Coach: Gerard Gallant
- Captain: Luke Richardson (Oct-Nov); Adam Foote (Dec-Apr)
- Alternate captains: Sergei Fedorov (Dec-Apr); Adam Foote (Oct-Dec); Rick Nash; David Vyborny
- Arena: Nationwide Arena
- Average attendance: 16,796 (92.6%)
- Minor league affiliates: Syracuse Crunch (AHL); Dayton Bombers (ECHL)

Team leaders
- Goals: Rick Nash (31)
- Assists: David Vyborny (43)
- Points: David Vyborny (65)
- Penalty minutes: Jody Shelley (163)
- Plus/minus: Ron Hainsey (+13)
- Wins: Marc Denis (21)
- Goals against average: Martin Prusek (3.22)

The 2005–06 Columbus Blue Jackets season was the sixth National Hockey League season (fifth season of play) in Columbus, Ohio. The team's final position in the standings was hampered by a slow start that resulted from losing a number of key players, including goals leader Rick Nash, to injury. Once these players returned to the roster, the team had one of the strongest second halves in the NHL. Despite the strong finish, the Blue Jackets finished outside of the playoffs and missed the playoffs for the fifth consecutive season for the first time in franshise history. However, the strong finish did lead to raised expectations for the 2006–07 season.

== Regular season ==
Prior to the start of the season the team announced Luke Richardson would remain team captain and Adam Foote, Rick Nash, and David Vyborny would serve as alternate captains on a rotating basis. Richardson resigned the captaincy after being a healthy scratch for Columbus’ November 25 game against the Colorado Avalanche. Foote was named the team’s new captain on December 6.

=== Season standings ===
Central Division
No.	CR		GP	W	L	OTL	GF	GA	Pts
1	1	**Detroit Red Wings**	82	58	16	8	305	209	124
2	4	**Nashville Predators**	82	49	25	8	259	227	106
3	13	Columbus Blue Jackets	82	35	43	4	223	279	74
4	14	Chicago Blackhawks	82	26	43	13	211	285	65
5	15	St. Louis Blues	82	21	46	15	197	292	57

Note: CR = Conference rank; GP = Games played; W = Wins; L = Losses; T = Ties; OTL = Overtime loss; GF = Goals for; GA = Goals against; Pts = Points
Bolded teams qualified for the playoffs.

Western Conference
R		Div	GP	W	L	OTL	GF	GA	Pts
**1**	**P-** Detroit Red Wings	**CE**	**82**	**58**	**16**	**8**	**305**	**209**	124
**2**	**Y-** Dallas Stars	**PA**	**82**	**53**	**23**	**6**	**265**	**218**	112
**3**	**Y-** Calgary Flames	**NW**	**82**	**46**	**25**	**11**	**218**	**200**	103
**4**	**X-** Nashville Predators	**CE**	**82**	**49**	**25**	**8**	**259**	**227**	106
**5**	**X-** San Jose Sharks	**PA**	**82**	**44**	**27**	**11**	**266**	**242**	99
**6**	**X-** Mighty Ducks of Anaheim	**PA**	**82**	**43**	**27**	**12**	**254**	**229**	98
**7**	**X-** Colorado Avalanche	**NW**	**82**	**43**	**30**	**9**	**283**	**257**	95
**8**	**X-** Edmonton Oilers	**NW**	**82**	**41**	**28**	**13**	**256**	**251**	95
8.5
9	Vancouver Canucks	NW	82	42	32	8	256	255	92
10	Los Angeles Kings	PA	82	42	35	5	249	270	89
11	Minnesota Wild	NW	82	38	36	8	231	215	84
12	Phoenix Coyotes	PA	82	38	39	5	246	271	81
13	Columbus Blue Jackets	CE	82	35	43	4	223	279	74
14	Chicago Blackhawks	CE	82	26	43	13	211	285	65
15	St. Louis Blues	CE	82	21	46	15	197	292	57

Divisions: CE – Central, PA – Pacific, NW – Northwest

P – Clinched Presidents Trophy; Y – Clinched division; X – Clinched playoff spot

== Schedule and results ==
2005–06 regular season
October: 4–8–0 (home: 3–3–0; road: 1–5–0)

Game	Date	Visitor	Score	Home	OT	Decision	Attendance	Record	Pts	Recap
1	October 5	Columbus	3 – 2	Washington		Leclaire	16,325	0–1–0	0	L
2	October 7	Calgary	3 – 1	Columbus		Denis	18,136	0–2–0	0	L
3	October 9	Columbus	3 – 2	Chicago		Denis	11,062	1–2–0	2	W
4	October 12	Columbus	1 – 4	San Jose		Denis	17,496	1–3–0	2	L
5	October 14	Columbus	3 – 4	Anaheim		Leclaire	12,930	1–4–0	2	L
6	October 16	Columbus	1 – 3	Los Angeles		Denis	17,156	1–5–0	2	L
7	October 21	San Jose	1 – 4	Columbus		Denis	15,388	2–5–0	4	W
8	October 22	Detroit	6 – 0	Columbus		Denis	18,136	2–6–0	4	L
9	October 24	Detroit	6 – 2	Columbus		Denis	16,098	2–7–0	4	L
10	October 26	Nashville	2 – 3	Columbus	OT	Prusek	15,110	3–7–0	6	W
11	October 28	Minnesota	1 – 2	Columbus	SO	Prusek	15,669	4–7–0	8	W
12	October 29	Columbus	1 – 3	Minnesota		Prusek	18,568	4–8–0	8	L

November: 3–10–0 (home: 1–5–0; road: 2–5–0)

Game	Date	Visitor	Score	Home	OT	Decision	Attendance	Record	Pts	Recap
13	November 1	Columbus	1 – 5	Edmonton		Denis	16,839	4–9–0	8	L
14	November 3	Columbus	1 – 2	Calgary		Denis	19,289	4–10–0	8	L
15	November 4	Columbus	3 – 5	Vancouver		Denis	18,630	4–11–0	8	L
16	November 9	St. Louis	1 – 3	Columbus		Denis	16,058	5–11–0	10	W
17	November 11	Edmonton	3 – 1	Columbus		Denis	18,136	5–12–0	10	L
18	November 13	Los Angeles	8 – 2	Columbus		Prusek	16,174	5–13–0	10	L
19	November 16	St. Louis	2 – 0	Columbus		Denis	15,802	5–14–0	10	L
20	November 18	Columbus	3 – 6	Dallas		Prusek	18,532	5–15–0	10	L
21	November 20	Columbus	1 – 5	Phoenix		Denis	13,953	5–16–0	10	L
22	November 23	Nashville	4 – 2	Columbus		Leclaire	15,833	5–17–0	10	L
23	November 25	Colorado	5 – 0	Columbus		Leclaire	18,136	5–18–0	10	L
24	November 26	Columbus	4 – 3	St. Louis		Prusek	15,002	6–18–0	12	W
25	November 30	Columbus	3 – 2	Minnesota	SO	Leclaire	18,568	7–18–0	14	W

December: 5–8–1 (home: 4–3–0; road: 1–5–1)

Game	Date	Visitor	Score	Home	OT	Decision	Attendance	Record	Pts	Recap
26	December 1	Columbus	1 – 4	St. Louis		Leclaire	12,307	7–19–0	14	L
27	December 8	NY Islanders	3 – 4	Columbus	SO	Leclaire	15,728	8–19–0	16	W
28	December 9	Columbus	2 – 5	Atlanta		Leclaire	14,260	8–20–0	16	L
29	December 11	New Jersey	2 – 3	Columbus	OT	Denis	17,157	9–20–0	18	W
30	December 13	Philadelphia	3 – 1	Columbus		Denis	16,263	9–21–0	18	L
31	December 15	Columbus	1 – 2	Carolina		Leclaire	11,069	9–22–0	18	L
32	December 17	Columbus	3 – 7	Nashville		Denis	16,020	9–23–0	18	L
33	December 20	Columbus	3 – 4	Detroit	SO	Leclaire	20,066	9–23–1	19	OTL
34	December 21	Dallas	5 – 3	Columbus		Leclaire	16,859	9–24–1	19	L
35	December 23	Nashville	5 – 4	Columbus		Denis	16,330	9–25–1	19	L
36	December 26	Chicago	3 – 4	Columbus	OT	Denis	17,441	10–25–1	21	W
37	December 28	Anaheim	0 – 1	Columbus		Denis	17,387	11–25–1	23	W
38	December 30	Columbus	3 – 2	Chicago		Denis	13,229	12–25–1	25	W
39	December 31	Columbus	2 – 5	Detroit		Denis	20,066	12–26–1	25	L

January: 8–4–1 (home: 6–1–0; road: 2–3–1)

Game	Date	Visitor	Score	Home	OT	Decision	Attendance	Record	Pts	Recap
40	January 5	Columbus	3 – 6	San Jose		Denis	15,275	12–27–1	25	L
41	January 7	Columbus	2 – 3	Colorado	SO	Leclaire	18,007	12–27–2	26	OTL
42	January 8	Columbus	2 – 5	Phoenix		Denis	14,436	13–27–2	28	W
43	January 11	Pittsburgh	1 – 6	Columbus		Leclaire	18,136	14–27–2	30	W
44	January 13	Columbus	2 – 4	Tampa Bay		Denis	20,425	14–28–2	30	L
45	January 14	Columbus	5 – 4	Florida	OT	Leclaire	17,991	15–28–2	32	W
46	January 16	NY Rangers	3 – 4	Columbus		Denis	16,355	16–28–2	34	W
47	January 18	Detroit	4 – 0	Columbus		Leclaire	17,089	16–29–2	34	L
48	January 20	St. Louis	3 – 4	Columbus	SO	Denis	17,268	17–29–2	36	W
49	January 21	Columbus	2 – 7	Nashville		Leclaire	15,416	17–30–2	36	L
50	January 24	Vancouver	5 – 6	Columbus		Denis	16,192	18–30–2	38	W
51	January 27	Minnesota	3 – 4	Columbus		Leclaire	17,153	19–30–2	40	W
52	January 28	Nashville	3 – 4	Columbus		Denis	18,136	20–30–2	42	W

February: 3–3–0 (home: 1–1–0; road: 2–2–0)

Game	Date	Visitor	Score	Home	OT	Decision	Attendance	Record	Pts	Recap
53	February 1	Columbus	2 – 1	Calgary	SO	Denis	19,289	21–30–2	44	W
54	February 2	Columbus	2 – 1	Edmonton	SO	Denis	16,839	22–30–2	46	W
55	February 6	Columbus	4 – 7	Vancouver		Denis	18,630	22–31–2	46	L
56	February 8	Los Angeles	4 – 7	Columbus		Denis	16,162	23–31–2	48	W
57	February 10	Colorado	4 – 1	Columbus		Denis	18,136	23–32–2	48	L
58	February 11	Columbus	2 – 5	Nashville		Denis	17,113	23–33–2	48	L

March: 7–7–1 (home: 4–4–0; road: 3–3–1)

Game	Date	Visitor	Score	Home	OT	Decision	Attendance	Record	Pts	Recap
59	March 2	Columbus	0 – 1	Colorado		Leclaire	18,007	23–34–2	48	L
60	March 4	Columbus	2 – 3	Los Angeles		Denis	17,238	23–35–2	48	L
61	March 5	Columbus	3 – 2	Anaheim	SO	Leclaire	16,124	24–35–2	50	W
62	March 7	Chicago	3 – 1	Columbus		Denis	16,137	24–36–2	50	L
63	March 9	Phoenix	4 – 5	Columbus		Leclaire	17,066	25–36–2	52	W
64	March 11	Edmonton	3 – 4	Columbus	OT	Denis	18,136	26–36–2	54	W
65	March 13	Columbus	2 – 3	St. Louis	OT	Leclaire	12,130	26–36–3	55	OTL
66	March 15	Columbus	2 – 3	Chicago		Denis	10,130	26–37–3	55	L
67	March 17	Vancouver	3 – 2	Columbus		Leclaire	16,163	26–38–3	55	L
68	March 19	Anaheim	3 – 4	Columbus		Denis	16,519	26–39–3	55	L
69	March 21	Phoenix	5 – 2	Columbus		Leclaire	15,581	26–40–3	55	L
70	March 24	Calgary	2 – 3	Columbus		Denis	17,041	27–40–3	57	W
71	March 25	Columbus	5 – 4	Detroit	SO	Leclaire	20,066	28–40–3	59	W
72	March 28	San Jose	1 – 4	Columbus		Denis	16,094	29–40–3	61	W
73	March 31	Columbus	4 – 2	St. Louis		Leclaire	14,101	30–40–3	63	W

April: 5–3–1 (home: 4–1–0; road: 1–2–1)

Game	Date	Visitor	Score	Home	OT	Decision	Attendance	Record	Pts	Recap
74	April 1	Chicago	2 – 5	Columbus		Denis	17,394	31–40–3	65	W
75	April 3	Columbus	3 – 1	Nashville		Leclaire	12,073	32–40–3	67	W
76	April 7	Columbus	5 – 6	Detroit	SO	Denis	20,066	32–40–4	68	OTL
77	April 8	Detroit	4 – 2	Columbus		Leclaire	18,136	32–41–4	68	L
78	April 11	Columbus	2 – 3	Dallas		Denis	18,543	32–42–4	68	L
79	April 13	St. Louis	1 – 4	Columbus		Leclaire	16,262	33–42–4	70	W
80	April 15	Chicago	2 – 5	Columbus		Denis	16,555	34–42–4	72	W
81	April 16	Columbus	3 – 4	Chicago		Leclaire	10,733	34–43–4	72	L
82	April 18	Dallas	4 – 5	Columbus	OT	Denis	17,103	35–43–4	74	W

Legend: W Win (2 points) L Loss (0 points) OTL Overtime/shootout loss (1 point)

== Player statistics ==
=== Scoring ===
- Position abbreviations: C = Center; D = Defense; G = Goaltender; LW = Left wing; RW = Right wing
- † = Joined team via a transaction (e.g., trade, waivers, signing) during the season. Stats reflect time with the Blue Jackets only.
- ‡ = Left team via a transaction (e.g., trade, waivers, release) during the season. Stats reflect time with the Blue Jackets only.

No.	Player	Pos	Regular season					
No.	Player	Pos	GP	G	A	Pts	+/-	PIM
9	David Vyborny	LW	80	22	43	65	−9	50
61	Rick Nash	LW	54	31	23	54	5	51
13	Nikolay Zherdev	RW	73	27	27	54	−13	50
91	Sergei Fedorov†	C	62	12	31	43	−1	64
38	Jan Hrdina	C	75	10	23	33	−8	78
4	Bryan Berard	D	44	12	20	32	−29	32
27	Manny Malhotra	C	58	10	21	31	1	41
25	Jason Chimera†	LW	80	17	13	30	−10	95
10	Trevor Letowski	RW	81	10	18	28	−2	36
15	Duvie Westcott	D	78	6	22	28	1	133
40	Jaroslav Balastik	LW	66	12	10	22	−1	26
52	Adam Foote	D	65	6	16	22	−16	89
97	Rostislav Klesla	D	51	6	13	19	−4	75
6	Ron Hainsey†	D	55	2	15	17	13	43
49	Dan Fritsche	RW	59	6	7	13	−14	22
42	Mark Hartigan	C	33	9	3	12	−1	22
45	Jody Shelley	LW	80	3	7	10	−4	163
26	Todd Marchant‡	C	18	3	6	9	−1	20
47	Aaron Johnson	D	26	2	6	8	9	23
21	Radoslav Suchy	D	79	1	7	8	−8	30
22	Luke Richardson‡	D	44	1	6	7	−18	30
20	Mike Rupp†	LW	39	4	2	6	−3	58
18	Geoff Platt†	C	15	0	5	5	−4	16
17	Gilbert Brule	C	7	2	2	4	−2	0
28	Tyler Wright‡	C	18	0	4	4	−3	20
5	Jamie Pushor†	D	4	1	2	3	1	0
32	Cale Hulse†‡	D	27	0	3	3	−9	43
24	Francois Beauchemin‡	D	11	0	2	2	−6	11
30	Marc Denis	G	49	0	1	1		2
31	Pascal Leclaire	G	33	0	1	1		2
51	Andy Delmore	D	7	0	0	0	−1	2
39	Steven Goertzen	RW	39	0	0	0	−17	44
50	Joakim Lindstrom	LW	3	0	0	0	0	0
37	Joe Motzko	LW	2	0	0	0	−2	0
19	Alexandre Picard	LW	17	0	0	0	−2	14
35	Martin Prusek	G	9	0	0	0		0
8	Geoff Sanderson‡	LW	2	0	0	0	−1	0
44	Peter Sarno	C	1	0	0	0	0	0
24	Cam Severson†	LW	4	0	0	0	0	5
41	Ben Simon	C	13	0	0	0	−4	4
55	Ole-Kristian Tollefsen	D	5	0	0	0	−2	2

=== Goaltending ===
No.	Player	Regular season									
No.	Player	GP	W	L	OT	SA	GA	GAA	SV%	SO	TOI
30	Marc Denis	49	21	25	1	1505	151	3.25	.900	1	2786
31	Pascal Leclaire	33	11	15	3	1084	97	3.23	.911	0	1804
35	Martin Prusek	9	3	3	0	165	20	3.21	.879	0	373

== Awards and records ==
=== Awards ===
Type	Award/honor	Recipient	Ref
League (in-season)	NHL Offensive Player of the Week	David Vyborny (January 30)	
Team	Foundation Community Service Award	Manny Malhotra	
Team	Three Stars Award	Rick Nash	

=== Milestones ===
Milestone	Player	Date	Ref
First game	Jaroslav Balastik	October 5, 2005	
First game	Gilbert Brule	October 5, 2005	
First game	Steven Goertzen	October 21, 2005	
First game	Alexandre Picard	November 18, 2005	
First game	Ole-Kristian Tollefsen	November 23, 2005	
First game	Geoff Platt	December 1, 2005	
First game	Joakim Lindstrom	February 8, 2006	
1,000th game played	Sergei Fedorov	November 30, 2005	
600th assist	Sergei Fedorov	January 8, 2006	

== Transactions ==
The Blue Jackets were involved in the following transactions from February 17, 2005, the day after the 2004–05 NHL season was officially cancelled, through June 19, 2006, the day of the deciding game of the 2006 Stanley Cup Finals.

=== Trades ===
Date	Details		Ref
July 30, 2005	To Columbus Blue Jackets: Toronto’s 4th-round pick in 2005	To Carolina Hurricanes: Rights to Derrick Walser; 4th-round pick in 2006	
October 8, 2005	To Columbus Blue Jackets: Jason Chimera; Cale Hulse; Mike Rupp	To Phoenix Coyotes: Tim Jackman; Geoff Sanderson	
November 15, 2005	To Columbus Blue Jackets: Sergei Fedorov; 5th-round pick in 2006	To Anaheim Mighty Ducks: Francois Beauchemin; Tyler Wright	
February 28, 2006	To Columbus Blue Jackets: Cam Severson	To Calgary Flames: Cale Hulse	
March 8, 2006	To Columbus Blue Jackets: Conditional draft pick (Note: Columbus would receive either a 5th-round pick in 2006 or a 4th-round pick in 2007. Columbus received the 2006 pick.)	To Toronto Maple Leafs: Luke Richardson	

=== Players acquired ===
Date	Player	Former team	Term	Via	Ref
August 2, 2005	Adam Foote	Colorado Avalanche	3-year	Free agency	
August 3, 2005	Bryan Berard	Chicago Blackhawks	2-year	Free agency	
August 4, 2005	Martin Prusek	Ottawa Senators	1-year	Free agency	
August 10, 2005	Jan Hrdina	New Jersey Devils	1-year	Free agency	
August 11, 2005	Ben Simon	Atlanta Thrashers	1-year	Free agency	
August 12, 2005	Jeff MacMillan	New York Rangers	1-year	Free agency	
August 22, 2005	Mark Flood	Peterborough Petes (OHL)	3-year	Free agency	
August 22, 2005	Peter Sarno	Vancouver Canucks	1-year	Free agency	
October 4, 2005	Andy Delmore	Detroit Red Wings		Waivers	
October 7, 2005	Jamie Pushor	Syracuse Crunch (AHL)		Free agency	
November 25, 2005	Geoff Platt	Syracuse Crunch (AHL)	multi-year	Free agency	
November 29, 2005	Ron Hainsey	Montreal Canadiens		Waivers	
December 30, 2005	Darcy Verot	Syracuse Crunch (AHL)	1-year	Free agency	

=== Players lost ===
Date	Player	New team	Via (Note: In parentheses is the player's free agency group on August 1 if applicable.)	Ref
N/A	Arturs Irbe	HK Riga 2000 (BHL)	Free agency (III)	
N/A	Matthias Trattnig	EC Red Bull Salzburg (EBEL)	Free agency (UFA)	
May 5, 2005	Andre Lakos	EC Red Bull Salzburg (EBEL)	Free agency (VI)	
May 27, 2005	Brad Moran	SCL Tigers (NLA)	Free agency (VI)	
May 27, 2005	Alexander Svitov	Avangard Omsk (RSL)	Free agency (II) (Note: Columbus retained Svitov’s NHL rights and re-signed him on July 1, 2006.)	
June 30, 2005	Darrel Scoville	EC VSV (EBEL)	Free agency (VI)	
July 28, 2005	Scott Lachance	Kloten Flyers (NLA) (Note: Lachance signed with Kloten on October 5.)	Compliance buyout	
July 29, 2005	Andrew Cassels	Washington Capitals (Note: Cassels signed with Washington on August 9.)	Compliance buyout	
August 1, 2005	Scott Heffernan (Note: Heffernan suffered what turned out to be a career ending head injury during the 2002–03 season.)		Contract expiration (UFA)	
August 4, 2005	Jaroslav Spacek	Chicago Blackhawks	Free agency (III)	
August 10, 2005	Ben Knopp	Phoenix Roadrunners (ECHL)	Free agency (UFA)	
August 11, 2005	Zenith Komarniski	Calgary Flames	Free agency (VI)	
August 12, 2005	Kent McDonell	Detroit Red Wings	Free agency (VI)	
August 18, 2005	Prestin Ryan	Vancouver Canucks	Free agency (UFA)	
September 7, 2005	Jeremy Reich	Boston Bruins	Free agency (VI)	
September 16, 2005	Karl Goehring	HIFK (Liiga)	Free agency (VI)	
October 10, 2005	Jeff Panzer	Rapperswil-Jona Lakers (NLA)	Free agency (VI)	
October 19, 2005	Mike Pandolfo	Reading Royals (ECHL)	Free agency (UFA)	
November 21, 2005	Todd Marchant	Anaheim Mighty Ducks	Waivers	
May 6, 2006	Martin Prusek	SKA Saint Petersburg (RSL)	Free agency	
May 23, 2006	Peter Sarno	HC Fribourg-Gotteron (NLA)	Free agency	

=== Signings ===
Date	Player	Term	Contract type	Ref
July 28, 2005	Philippe Dupuis	3-year	Entry-level	
July 28, 2005	Marc Methot	3-year	Entry-level	
July 28, 2005	Joe Motzko	2-year	Re-signing	
July 28, 2005	Radoslav Suchy	1-year	Option exercised	
July 28, 2005	Duvie Westcott	2-year	Re-signing	
August 1, 2005	Francois Beauchemin	2-year	Re-signing	
August 8, 2005	Rick Nash	5-year	Re-signing	
August 15, 2005	Tim Jackman	1-year	Re-signing	
August 15, 2005	Rostislav Klesla	1-year	Re-signing	
August 15, 2005	Pascal Leclaire	1-year	Re-signing	
August 15, 2005	Brandon Sugden	1-year	Re-signing	
August 16, 2005	Andrew Murray		Entry-level	
August 19, 2005	Jaroslav Balastik	1-year	Entry-level	
August 22, 2005	Mark Hartigan	2-year	Re-signing	
August 29, 2005	Alexandre Picard	3-year	Entry-level	
August 29, 2005	Tomas Popperle	3-year	Entry-level	
September 19, 2005	Adam Pineault		Entry-level	
October 3, 2005	Gilbert Brule	3-year	Entry-level	
February 3, 2006	Joakim Lindstrom	3-year	Entry-level	
April 18, 2006	Rostislav Klesla	4-year	Re-signing	
May 5, 2006	David Vyborny	2-year	Re-signing	
June 1, 2006	Dan LaCosta	3-year	Entry-level	
June 1, 2006	Petr Pohl	3-year	Entry-level	
June 1, 2006	Kyle Wharton	3-year	Entry-level	
June 15, 2006	Jody Shelley	2-year	Re-signing	

== Draft picks ==
Columbus' picks at the 2005 NHL entry draft in Ottawa, Ontario. The Blue Jackets picked sixth in odd rounds, 25th in even rounds.

Round	#	Player	Nationality	NHL team	College/Junior/Club team (League)
1	6	Gilbert Brule (C)	Canada	Columbus Blue Jackets	Vancouver Giants (WHL)
2	55	Adam McQuaid (D)	Canada	Columbus Blue Jackets	Sudbury Wolves (OHL)
3	67	Kris Russell (D)	Canada	Columbus Blue Jackets	Medicine Hat Tigers (WHL)
4	101	Jared Boll (RW)	United States	Columbus Blue Jackets (from Toronto Maple Leafs)	Lincoln Stars (USHL)
5	131	Tomas Popperle (G)	Czech Republic	Columbus Blue Jackets	Sparta Prague (Czech Republic)
6	177	Derek Reinhart (D)	Canada	Columbus Blue Jackets (from Phoenix)	Regina Pats (WHL)
6	189	Kirill Starkov (LW)	Russia	Columbus Blue Jackets	Frolunda HC Jr. (Sweden Jr.)
7	201	Trevor Hendrikx (D)	Canada	Columbus Blue Jackets	Peterborough Petes (OHL)

== Farm teams ==
=== Syracuse Crunch ===
The Syracuse Crunch are the Blue Jackets American Hockey League affiliate for the sixth season.

=== Dayton Bombers ===
The Dayton Bombers of the ECHL are also entering their sixth season as an affiliate of the Blue Jackets.

== See also ==
- 2005–06 NHL season
