= Jason Marshall (ice hockey) =

Canadian ice hockey player (born 1971)

- Born: February 22, 1971 (age 55) Cranbrook, British Columbia, Canada
- Height: 6 ft 2 in (188 cm)
- Weight: 195 lb (88 kg; 13 st 13 lb)
- Position: Defence
- Shot: Right
- Played for: St. Louis Blues; Mighty Ducks of Anaheim; Washington Capitals; Minnesota Wild; San Jose Sharks; Kölner Haie (DEL); Frankfurt Lions (DEL)
- NHL draft: 9th overall, 1989; St. Louis Blues
- Playing career: 1991–2008

Jason Marshall (born February 22, 1971) is a Canadian former professional ice hockey defenceman.

== Early life ==
Marshall was born in Cranbrook, British Columbia. He began his career with Team Canada internationally and in the British Columbia Hockey League with the Vernon Lakers.

== Career ==
While continuing to play with Canada, Marshall joined the Tri-City Americans in the Western Hockey League. He then played several seasons in the International Hockey League, mainly with the Peoria Rivermen and then with the San Diego Gulls. His NHL career began after a passage with the St. Louis Blues, after which he joined the Mighty Ducks of Anaheim, with whom he played several seasons. Subsequently, he often changed teams and had two stints over Europe, interrupted by a season with the Mighty Ducks, the first in Czech Extraliga during the lockout of 2004-2005 in the NHL, the second in the Deutsche Eishockey Liga, where he finished his career in 2008 when he wore the colors of the Frankfurt Lions. Throughout his career, Marshall accumulated several seasons of over 200 penalty minutes. However, during his time in the NHL, he was less penalized, and he never exceeded 189 minutes from 1997 to 1998.

After retiring from hockey, Marshall completed a degree in architecture from the Cal Poly Pomona College of Environmental Design. Upon graduation, Marshall found employment with Frank Gehry, CC, FAIA, Canadian-born American architect.

== Career statistics ==
=== Regular season and playoffs ===
			Regular season					Playoffs
Season	Team	League	GP	G	A	Pts	PIM	GP	G	A	Pts	PIM
1987–88	Columbia Valley Rockies	RMJHL	40	4	28	32	150	—	—	—	—	—
1988–89	Vernon Lakers	BCHL	48	10	30	40	197	—	—	—	—	—
1988–89	Canada	Intl	2	0	1	1	0	—	—	—	—	—
1989–90	Canada	Intl	73	1	11	12	57	—	—	—	—	—
1990–91	Tri-City Americans	WHL	59	10	34	44	236	7	1	2	3	20
1990–91	Peoria Rivermen	IHL	—	—	—	—	—	18	0	1	1	48
1991–92	Peoria Rivermen	IHL	78	4	18	22	178	10	0	1	1	16
1991–92	St. Louis Blues	NHL	2	1	0	1	4	10	0	1	1	4
1992–93	Peoria Rivermen	IHL	77	4	16	20	229	4	0	0	0	0
1993–94	Canada	Intl	41	3	10	13	60	—	—	—	—	—
1993–94	Peoria Rivermen	IHL	20	1	1	2	72	3	2	0	2	2
1994–95	San Diego Gulls	IHL	80	7	18	25	218	5	0	1	1	8
1994–95	Mighty Ducks of Anaheim	NHL	1	0	0	0	0	—	—	—	—	—
1995–96	Baltimore Bandits	AHL	57	1	13	14	150	—	—	—	—	—
1995–96	Mighty Ducks of Anaheim	NHL	24	0	1	1	42	—	—	—	—	—
1996–97	Mighty Ducks of Anaheim	NHL	73	1	9	10	140	7	0	1	1	4
1997–98	Mighty Ducks of Anaheim	NHL	72	3	6	9	189	—	—	—	—	—
1998–99	Mighty Ducks of Anaheim	NHL	72	1	7	8	142	4	1	0	1	10
1999–2000	Mighty Ducks of Anaheim	NHL	55	0	3	3	88	—	—	—	—	—
2000–01	Mighty Ducks of Anaheim	NHL	55	3	4	7	105	—	—	—	—	—
2000–01	Washington Capitals	NHL	5	0	0	0	17	—	—	—	—	—
2001–02	Minnesota Wild	NHL	80	5	6	11	148	12	1	5	6	12
2002–03	Minnesota Wild	NHL	45	1	5	6	69	15	1	1	2	16
2003–04	Minnesota Wild	NHL	12	1	4	5	18	—	—	—	—	—
2003–04	Houston Aeros	AHL	49	7	12	19	87	—	—	—	—	—
2003–04	San Jose Sharks	NHL	12	0	2	2	8	17	0	1	1	25
2004–05	HC Lasselsberger Plzeň	ELH	11	1	3	4	53	—	—	—	—	—
2005–06	Mighty Ducks of Anaheim	NHL	23	0	4	4	34	—	—	—	—	—
2005–06	Portland Pirates	AHL	2	0	0	0	4	—	—	—	—	—
2006–07	Kölner Haie	DEL	46	7	10	17	253	9	0	0	0	32
2007–08	Frankfurt Lions	DEL	44	2	9	11	179	12	1	4	5	38
NHL totals			518	10	51	61	1004	43	2	3	5	55
IHL totals			255	16	53	69	697	29	3	4	7	66
AHL totals			108	8	25	33	241	—	—	—	—	—

=== International ===
Year	Team	Event		GP	G	A	Pts	PIM
1991	Canada	WJC	1st place, gold medalist(s)	7	0	4	4	6

Awards and achievements
Preceded by Rod Brind'Amour	St. Louis Blues first-round draft pick 1989	Succeeded by Marty Reasoner
