= 2010–11 Edmonton Oilers season =

NHL team season

2010–11 Edmonton Oilers
- Division: 5th Northwest
- Conference: 15th Western
- 2010–11 record: 25–45–12
- Home record: 13–22–6
- Road record: 12–23–6
- Goals for: 193
- Goals against: 269

Team information
- General manager: Steve Tambellini
- Coach: Tom Renney
- Captain: Shawn Horcoff
- Alternate captains: Ales Hemsky; Ryan Whitney
- Arena: Rexall Place
- Average attendance: 16,839 (100%)
- Minor league affiliates: Oklahoma City Barons (AHL); Stockton Thunder (ECHL)

Team leaders
- Goals: Taylor Hall (22)
- Assists: Ales Hemsky (28)
- Points: Jordan Eberle (43)
- Penalty minutes: Theo Peckham (198)
- Plus/minus: Ryan Whitney (+13)
- Wins: Devan Dubnyk (12)
- Goals against average: Martin Gerber (1.30)

The 2010–11 Edmonton Oilers season was the 32nd season of play for the National Hockey League (NHL) franchise that was established on June 22, 1979, and 39th season of play including their play in the World Hockey Association.

The Oilers posted a regular season record of 25 wins, 45 losses, and 12 overtime/shootout losses for 62 points and last place in the 30 team league, failing to qualify for the Stanley Cup playoffs for the fifth consecutive season for the first time in franchise history.

A documentary on the season was produced for TSN titled Oil Change.

== Off-season ==
- On June 22, Tom Renney was named as the head coach of the Oilers, with Pat Quinn moving on to the role of senior hockey advisor.
- The Oilers earned the first overall pick in the 2010 NHL entry draft, via selection lottery. On June 25, 2010, the long-awaited anticipation and debates were finally settled when Edmonton selected Taylor Hall as their first-ever first overall pick.
- On July 15, the Oilers announced the appointments of Kelly Buchberger (retaining the same position the season previous) and Steve Smith as the two assistant coaches to new head coach Tom Renney, as well as the appointment of Todd Nelson, head coach for American Hockey League affiliate, the Oklahoma City Barons.
- On July 30, the Oilers announced Ralph Krueger as their associate coach, who replaces Wayne Fleming, who left to work with the Tampa Bay Lightning.

== Regular season ==
=== Divisional standings ===
Northwest Division
		GP	W	L	OTL	ROW	GF	GA	Pts
**1**	**p-Vancouver Canucks**	**82**	**54**	**19**	**9**	**50**	**262**	**185**	**117**
2	Calgary Flames	82	41	29	12	32	250	237	94
3	Minnesota Wild	82	39	35	8	36	206	233	86
4	Colorado Avalanche	82	30	44	8	24	227	288	68
5	Edmonton Oilers	82	25	45	12	23	193	269	62

=== Conference standings ===
Western Conference
R		Div	GP	W	L	OTL	ROW	GF	GA	Pts
**1**	**p – Vancouver Canucks**	**NW**	**82**	**54**	**19**	**9**	**50**	**262**	**185**	117
**2**	**y – San Jose Sharks**	**PA**	**82**	**48**	**25**	**9**	**43**	**248**	**213**	105
**3**	**y – Detroit Red Wings**	**CE**	**82**	**47**	**25**	**10**	**43**	**261**	**241**	104
**4**	**Anaheim Ducks**	**PA**	**82**	**47**	**30**	**5**	**43**	**239**	**235**	99
**5**	**Nashville Predators**	**CE**	**82**	**44**	**27**	**11**	**38**	**219**	**194**	99
**6**	**Phoenix Coyotes**	**PA**	**82**	**43**	**26**	**13**	**38**	**231**	**226**	99
**7**	**Los Angeles Kings**	**PA**	**82**	**46**	**30**	**6**	**36**	**219**	**198**	98
**8**	**Chicago Blackhawks**	**CE**	**82**	**44**	**29**	**9**	**38**	**258**	**225**	97
8.5
9	Dallas Stars	PA	82	42	29	11	37	227	233	95
10	Calgary Flames	NW	82	41	29	12	32	250	237	94
11	St. Louis Blues	CE	82	38	33	11	34	240	234	87
12	Minnesota Wild	NW	82	39	35	8	36	206	233	86
13	Columbus Blue Jackets	CE	82	34	35	13	29	215	258	81
14	Colorado Avalanche	NW	82	30	44	8	24	227	288	68
15	Edmonton Oilers	NW	82	25	45	12	23	193	269	62

bold – qualified for playoffs; y – Won division; p – Won President's Trophy (best record in NHL)
CE – Central Division, NW – Northwest Division, PA – Pacific Division

== Playoffs ==
The Oilers were eliminated from playoffs contention on March 14, 2011, continuing their streak of missing the post-season since the 2005–06 season that would not be broken until the 2016–17 season.

== Schedule and results ==
=== Pre-season ===
2010 Pre-season Game Log: 4–2–0 (Home: 3–1–0; Road: 1–1–0)
#	Date	Visitor	Score	Home	OT	Decision	Attendance	Record	Recap
1	September 22	Edmonton Oilers	3 – 2	Vancouver Canucks		Dubnyk	18,860	1–0–0
2	September 23	Tampa Bay Lightning	2 – 5	Edmonton Oilers		Deslauriers	16,839	2–0–0
3	September 26	Vancouver Canucks	2 – 8	Edmonton Oilers		Khabibulin	16,839	3–0–0
4	September 29	Phoenix Coyotes	3 – 4	Edmonton Oilers	SO	Gerber	16,839	4–0–0
5	October 1	Calgary Flames	5 – 1	Edmonton Oilers		Khabibulin	16,839	4–1–0
6	October 3	Edmonton Oilers	0 – 1	Calgary Flames		Deslauriers	19,289	4–2–0

=== Regular season ===
2010–11 Game Log

October: 3–4–2 (Home: 2–2–0; Road: 1–2–2)
#	Date	Visitor	Score	Home	OT	Decision	Attendance	Record	Pts	Recap
1	October 7	Calgary Flames	0 – 4	Edmonton Oilers		Khabibulin	16,839	1–0–0	2
2	October 10	Florida Panthers	2 – 3	Edmonton Oilers		Khabibulin	16,839	2–0–0	4
3	October 14	Edmonton Oilers	2 – 4	Minnesota Wild		Khabibulin	18,449	2–1–0	4
4	October 16	Edmonton Oilers	3 – 5	Calgary Flames		Khabibulin	19,289	2–2–0	4
5	October 21	Minnesota Wild	4 – 2	Edmonton Oilers		Khabibulin	16,839	2–3–0	4
6	October 23	San Jose Sharks	6 – 1	Edmonton Oilers		Khabibulin	16,839	2–4–0	4
7	October 26	Edmonton Oilers	4 – 5	Calgary Flames	SO	Khabibulin	19,289	2–4–1	5
8	October 28	Edmonton Oilers	2 – 3	Columbus Blue Jackets	SO	Dubnyk	9,128	2–4–2	6
9	October 29	Edmonton Oilers	7 – 4	Chicago Blackhawks		Khabibulin	21,061	3–4–2	8

November: 4–8–2 (Home: 1–4–1; Road: 3–4–1)
#	Date	Visitor	Score	Home	OT	Decision	Attendance	Record	Pts	Recap
10	November 2	Vancouver Canucks	4 – 3	Edmonton Oilers		Khabibulin	16,839	3–5–2	8
11	November 5	Detroit Red Wings	3 – 1	Edmonton Oilers		Khabibulin	16,839	3–6–2	8
12	November 7	Edmonton Oilers	2 – 1	Chicago Blackhawks		Khabibulin	21,025	4–6–2	10
13	November 9	Edmonton Oilers	1 – 7	Carolina Hurricanes		Khabibulin	11,890	4–7–2	10
14	November 11	Edmonton Oilers	2 – 6	Detroit Red Wings		Khabibulin	20,066	4–8–2	10
15	November 12	Edmonton Oilers	3 – 4	New Jersey Devils	OT	Dubnyk	14,650	4–8–3	11
16	November 14	Edmonton Oilers	2 – 8	New York Rangers		Khabibulin	17,658	4–9–3	11
17	November 17	Chicago Blackhawks	5 – 0	Edmonton Oilers		Khabibulin	16,839	4–10–3	11
18	November 19	Phoenix Coyotes	4 – 3	Edmonton Oilers	SO	Dubnyk	16,839	4–10–4	12
19	November 21	Edmonton Oilers	4 – 2	Anaheim Ducks		Dubnyk	14,267	5–10–4	14
20	November 23	Edmonton Oilers	0 – 5	Phoenix Coyotes		Dubnyk	9,354	5–11–4	14
21	November 25	Colorado Avalanche	2 – 3	Edmonton Oilers		Gerber	16,839	6–11–4	16
22	November 27	San Jose Sharks	4 – 3	Edmonton Oilers		Dubnyk	16,839	6–12–4	16
23	November 29	Edmonton Oilers	4 – 1	Ottawa Senators		Gerber	17,002	7–12–4	18

December: 5–5–3 (Home: 3–3–2; Road: 2–2–1)
#	Date	Visitor	Score	Home	OT	Decision	Attendance	Record	Pts	Recap
24	December 1	Edmonton Oilers	4 – 3	Montreal Canadiens	OT	Dubnyk	21,273	8–12–4	20
25	December 2	Edmonton Oilers	5 – 0	Toronto Maple Leafs		Khabibulin	19,465	9–12–4	22
26	December 4	St. Louis Blues	1 – 2	Edmonton Oilers	OT	Khabibulin	16,839	10–12–4	24
27	December 7	Anaheim Ducks	3 – 2	Edmonton Oilers	SO	Khabibulin	16,839	10–12–5	25
28	December 10	Tampa Bay Lightning	3 – 4	Edmonton Oilers	SO	Khabibulin	16,839	11–12–5	27
29	December 12	Vancouver Canucks	2 – 1	Edmonton Oilers		Dubnyk	16,839	11–13–5	27
30	December 14	Toronto Maple Leafs	4 – 1	Edmonton Oilers		Khabibulin	16,839	11–14–5	27
31	December 16	Columbus Blue Jackets	3 – 6	Edmonton Oilers		Khabibulin	16,839	12–14–5	29
32	December 21	Edmonton Oilers	1 – 2	San Jose Sharks		Khabibulin	17,562	12–15–5	29
33	December 23	Edmonton Oilers	2 – 3	Los Angeles Kings	SO	Dubnyk	18,118	12–15–6	30
34	December 26	Edmonton Oilers	2 – 3	Vancouver Canucks		Khabibulin	18,860	12–16–6	30
35	December 28	Buffalo Sabres	4 – 2	Edmonton Oilers		Khabibulin	16,839	12–17–6	30
36	December 30	Colorado Avalanche	4 – 3	Edmonton Oilers	SO	Dubnyk	16,839	12–17–7	31

January: 3–9–1 (Home: 1–4–1; Road: 2–5–0)
#	Date	Visitor	Score	Home	OT	Decision	Attendance	Record	Pts	Recap
37	January 1	Calgary Flames	2 – 1	Edmonton Oilers		Khabibulin	16,839	12–18–7	31
38	January 4	Detroit Red Wings	5 – 3	Edmonton Oilers		Khabibulin	16,839	12–19–7	31
39	January 6	New York Islanders	1 – 2	Edmonton Oilers		Dubnyk	16,839	13–19–7	33
40	January 7	Edmonton Oilers	1 – 6	Vancouver Canucks		Khabibulin	18,860	13–20–7	33
41	January 11	Edmonton Oilers	2 – 3	Dallas Stars		Khabibulin	12,463	13–21–7	33
42	January 13	Edmonton Oilers	5 – 2	San Jose Sharks		Dubnyk	17,562	14–21–7	35
43	January 15	Edmonton Oilers	2 – 5	Los Angeles Kings		Dubnyk	18,118	14–22–7	35
44	January 16	Edmonton Oilers	2 – 3	Anaheim Ducks		Khabibulin	15,764	14–23–7	35
45	January 18	Minnesota Wild	4 – 1	Edmonton Oilers		Khabibulin	16,839	14–24–7	35
46	January 20	Dallas Stars	4 – 2	Edmonton Oilers		Khabibulin	16,839	14–25–7	35
47	January 23	Nashville Predators	3 – 2	Edmonton Oilers	SO	Dubnyk	16,839	14–25–8	36
48	January 25	Edmonton Oilers	4 – 3	Phoenix Coyotes		Dubnyk	10,057	15–25–8	38
49	January 26	Edmonton Oilers	1 – 3	Dallas Stars		Khabibulin	13,875	15–26–8	38

February: 5–9–0 (Home: 3–6–0; Road: 2–3–0)
#	Date	Visitor	Score	Home	OT	Decision	Attendance	Record	Pts	Recap
50	February 2	Los Angeles Kings	3 – 1	Edmonton Oilers		Khabibulin	16,839	15–27–8	38
51	February 4	Edmonton Oilers	3 – 5	St. Louis Blues		Dubnyk	19,150	15–28–8	38
52	February 5	Edmonton Oilers	3 – 4	Columbus Blue Jackets		Khabibulin	18,370	15–29–8	38
53	February 7	Edmonton Oilers	4 – 0	Nashville Predators		Dubnyk	14,388	16–29–8	40
54	February 9	Chicago Blackhawks	4 – 1	Edmonton Oilers		Dubnyk	16,839	16–30–8	40
55	February 12	Ottawa Senators	5 – 3	Edmonton Oilers		Khabibulin	16,839	16–31–8	40
56	February 13	Anaheim Ducks	4 – 0	Edmonton Oilers		Dubnyk	16,389	16–32–8	40
57	February 15	Dallas Stars	1 – 4	Edmonton Oilers		Khabibulin	16,839	17–32–8	42
58	February 17	Montreal Canadiens	1 – 4	Edmonton Oilers		Khabibulin	16,839	18–32–8	44
59	February 19	Atlanta Thrashers	3 – 5	Edmonton Oilers		Dubnyk	16,839	19–32–8	46
60	February 22	Edmonton Oilers	1 – 4	Minnesota Wild		Khabibulin	17,321	19–33–8	46
61	February 23	Edmonton Oilers	5 – 1	Colorado Avalanche		Dubnyk	14,801	20–33–8	48
62	February 25	St. Louis Blues	5 – 0	Edmonton Oilers		Dubnyk	16,389	20–34–8	48
63	February 27	Boston Bruins	3 – 2	Edmonton Oilers		Dubnyk	16,389	20–35–8	48

March: 3–8–3 (Home: 2–4–2; Road: 1–4–1)
#	Date	Visitor	Score	Home	OT	Decision	Attendance	Record	Pts	Recap
64	March 1	Nashville Predators	1 – 2	Edmonton Oilers	SO	Gerber	16,389	21–35–8	50
65	March 3	Columbus Blue Jackets	2 – 4	Edmonton Oilers		Dubnyk	16,839	22–35–8	52
66	March 5	Edmonton Oilers	5 – 1	Colorado Avalanche		Dubnyk	15,869	23–35–8	54
67	March 8	Edmonton Oilers	1 – 4	Philadelphia Flyers		Dubnyk	19,730	23–36–8	54
68	March 9	Edmonton Oilers	0 – 5	Washington Capitals		Khabibulin	18,398	23–37–8	54
69	March 11	Edmonton Oilers	1 – 2	Detroit Red Wings	OT	Dubnyk	20,066	23–37–9	55
70	March 13	Edmonton Oilers	1 – 5	Pittsburgh Penguins		Dubnyk	18,197	23–38–9	55
71	March 17	Phoenix Coyotes	3 – 1	Edmonton Oilers		Dubnyk	16,839	23–39–9	55
72	March 19	Colorado Avalanche	3 – 2	Edmonton Oilers	SO	Khabibulin	16,839	23–39–10	56
73	March 22	Edmonton Oilers	1 – 3	Nashville Predators		Dubnyk	15,745	23–40–10	56
74	March 24	Edmonton Oilers	0 – 4	St. Louis Blues		Khabibulin	19,150	23–41–10	56
75	March 26	Calgary Flames	5 – 4	Edmonton Oilers	SO	Dubnyk	16,839	23–41–11	57
76	March 29	Los Angeles Kings	2 – 0	Edmonton Oilers		Khabibulin	16,839	23–42–11	57
77	March 31	Edmonton Oilers	2 – 4	Minnesota Wild		Khabibulin	18,120	23–43–11	57

April: 2–2–1 (Home: 1–1–0; Road: 1–1–1)
#	Date	Visitor	Score	Home	OT	Decision	Attendance	Record	Pts	Recap
78	April 2	Edmonton Oilers	4 – 1	Vancouver Canucks		Dubnyk	18,860	24–43–11	59
79	April 5	Vancouver Canucks	0 – 2	Edmonton Oilers		Dubnyk	16,839	25–43–11	61
80	April 6	Edmonton Oilers	1 – 6	Calgary Flames		Khabibulin	19,289	25–44–11	61
81	April 8	Minnesota Wild	3 – 1	Edmonton Oilers		Dubnyk	16,839	25–45–11	61
82	April 10	Edmonton Oilers	3 – 4	Colorado Avalanche	OT	Khabibulin	17,566	25–45–12	62

Legend: Win (2 points) Loss (0 points) Overtime/shootout loss (1 point)

Schedule

== Player statistics ==
=== Skaters ===
Note: Pos = Position; GP = Games played; G = Goals; A = Assists; Pts = Points; PIM = Penalty minutes; +/- = Plus/minus; PPG = Power-play goals; SHG = Short-handed goals; GWG = Game-winning goals

Regular season

Player	GP	G	A	Pts	+/−	PIM
Jordan Eberle	69	18	25	43	-12	22
Ales Hemsky	47	14	28	42	3	18
Sam Gagner	68	15	27	42	-17	37
Taylor Hall	65	22	20	42	-9	27
Dustin Penner^{‡}	62	21	18	39	-12	45
Andrew Cogliano	82	11	24	35	-12	64
Magnus Paajarvi	80	15	19	34	-13	16
Shawn Horcoff	47	9	18	27	-1	46
Ryan Whitney	35	2	25	27	13	33
Linus Omark	51	5	22	27	-16	26
Tom Gilbert	79	6	20	26	-14	32
Ryan Jones	81	18	7	25	-5	34
Kurtis Foster	74	8	14	22	-12	45
Jim Vandermeer	62	2	12	14	-15	74
Theo Peckham	71	3	10	13	-5	198
Ladislav Smid	78	0	10	10	-10	85
Liam Reddox	44	1	9	10	-8	20
Gilbert Brule	41	7	2	9	-7	41
Jean-Francois Jacques	51	4	1	5	-6	63
Colin Fraser	67	3	2	5	-2	60
Ryan O'Marra	21	1	4	5	-2	13
Jeff Petry	35	1	4	5	-12	10
Teemu Hartikainen	12	3	2	5	-3	4
Zack Stortini	32	0	4	4	-2	76
Taylor Chorney	12	1	3	4	-5	4
Jason Strudwick	43	0	2	2	-16	23
Alexandre Giroux	8	1	1	2	-2	2
Chris VandeVelde	12	0	2	2	-6	12
Steve MacIntyre	34	0	1	1	-1	93
Richard Petiot	2	0	0	0	1	2
Alex Plante	3	0	0	0	-2	11
Shawn Belle^{‡}	5	0	0	0	-2	0

=== Goaltenders ===
Note: Pos = Position;GP = Games played; Min, TOI = Minutes played; W = Wins; L = Losses; T,T/OT = Ties; OTL = Overtime losses; GA = Goals-against; GAA = Goals-against average; SO = Shutouts; SA = Shots against; SV = Shots saved; SV% = Save percentage;

Regular season

Player	GP	TOI	W	L	OT	GA	GAA	SA	Sv%	SO	G	A	PIM
Nikolai Khabibulin	47	2701	10	32	4	153	3.40	1389	.890	2	0	0	12
Devan Dubnyk	35	2061	12	13	8	93	2.71	1103	.916	2	0	0	2
Martin Gerber	3	185	3	0	0	4	1.30	95	.958	0	0	1	0

^{†}Denotes player spent time with another team before joining Oilers. Stats reflect time with Oilers only.
^{‡}Traded mid-season. Stats reflect time with Oilers only.

== Awards and records ==
=== Awards ===
Regular Season
Player	Award	Reached
Taylor Hall	NHL Third Star of the Week	December 6, 2010
Ales Hemsky	NHL Third Star of the Week	February 21, 2011

=== Milestones ===
Regular Season
Player	Milestone	Reached
Jordan Eberle	1st NHL Game; 1st NHL Goal; 1st NHL Assist; 1st NHL Point	October 7, 2010
Taylor Hall	1st NHL Game	October 7, 2010
Magnus Paajarvi	1st NHL Game	October 7, 2010
Ryan Whitney	200th NHL Point	October 7, 2010
Taylor Hall	1st NHL Assist; 1st NHL Point	October 10, 2010
Dustin Penner	200th NHL Point	October 10, 2010
Nikolai Khabibulin	700th NHL Game	October 16, 2010
Magnus Paajarvi	1st NHL Goal; 1st NHL Assist; 1st NHL Point	October 16, 2010
Ryan Jones	100th NHL Game	October 21, 2010
Taylor Hall	1st NHL Goal	October 28, 2010
Theo Peckham	1st NHL Goal	November 11, 2010
Ladislav Smid	200th NHL PIM	November 14, 2010
Dustin Penner	100th NHL Assist	November 27, 2010
Andrew Cogliano	100th NHL PIM	December 2, 2010
Linus Omark	1st NHL Game; 1st NHL Assist; 1st NHL Point	December 10, 2010
Linus Omark	1st NHL Goal	December 16, 2010
Sam Gagner	100th NHL Assist	December 21, 2010
Ryan O'Marra	1st NHL Goal	December 26, 2010
Jeff Petry	1st NHL Game; 1st NHL Assist; 1st NHL Point	December 28, 2010
Jim Vandermeer	400th NHL Game	January 6, 2011
Steve MacIntyre	100th NHL PIM	January 7, 2011
Tom Gilbert	300th NHL Game; 100th NHL Assist	January 13, 2011
Colin Fraser	200th NHL Game	January 15, 2011
Theo Peckham	200th NHL PIM	January 18, 2011
Zack Stortini	700th NHL PIM	January 18, 2011
Kurtis Foster	300th NHL Game	January 20, 2011
Jeff Petry	1st NHL Goal	January 20, 2011
Ladislav Smid	300th NHL Game	February 4, 2011
Devan Dubnyk	1st NHL Shutout	February 7, 2011
Andrew Cogliano	300th NHL Game	February 9, 2011
Kurtis Foster	100th NHL Assist	February 12, 2011
Jim Vandermeer	600th NHL PIM	February 12, 2011
Taylor Chorney	1st NHL Goal	February 15, 2011
Dustin Penner	400th NHL Game	February 17, 2011
Taylor Hall	1st NHL Hat-trick	February 19, 2011
Jason Strudwick	800th NHL PIM	February 25, 2011
Taylor Hall	1st NHL Gordie Howe hat trick	March 3, 2011
Shawn Horcoff	400th NHL Point	March 3, 2011
Teemu Hartikainen	1st NHL Game; 1st NHL Assist; 1st NHL Point	March 17, 2011
Chris VandeVelde	1st NHL Game	March 17, 2011
Jim Vandermeer	100th NHL Point	March 22, 2011
Teemu Hartikainen	1st NHL Goal	March 26, 2011
Chris VandeVelde	1st NHL Assist; 1st NHL Point	April 2, 2011
Theo Peckham	100th NHL Game	April 6, 2011
Theo Peckham	300th NHL PIM	April 10, 2011
Liam Reddox	100th NHL Game	April 10, 2011

== Transactions ==
The Oilers have been involved in the following transactions during the 2010–11 season.

=== Trades ===
Date	Details
June 24, 2010	To Chicago Blackhawks 6th-round pick in 2010	To Edmonton Oilers Colin Fraser
June 26, 2010	To Carolina Hurricanes Riley Nash	To Edmonton Oilers 2nd-round pick in 2010
June 26, 2010	To Toronto Maple Leafs 6th-round pick in 2011	To Edmonton Oilers 7th-round pick in 2010
June 30, 2010	To Phoenix Coyotes Patrick O'Sullivan	To Edmonton Oilers Jim Vandermeer
February 28, 2011	To Colorado Avalanche Shawn Belle	To Edmonton Oilers Kevin Montgomery
February 28, 2011	To Los Angeles Kings Dustin Penner	To Edmonton Oilers Colten Teubert; 1st-round pick in 2011; 3rd-round pick in 2012

=== Free agents acquired ===
Date	Player	Former team	Term
July 1, 2010	Kurtis Foster	Tampa Bay Lightning	2 years, $3.6 million
July 2, 2010	Richard Petiot	Rockford IceHogs	1 year, $555,000
July 2, 2010	Steve MacIntyre	Florida Panthers	1 year, $500,000
July 3, 2010	Alexandre Giroux	Washington Capitals	1 year, $500,000
July 7, 2010	Brad Moran	Skellefteå AIK	1 year, $500,000
July 9, 2010	Ben Ondrus	Toronto Maple Leafs	1 year, $555,000
July 13, 2010	Shawn Belle	Montreal Canadiens	1 year, $650,000
July 16, 2010	Gregory Stewart	Montreal Canadiens	1 year, $555,000
August 6, 2010	Martin Gerber	Atlant Moscow Oblast	1 year, $500,000
March 8, 2011	Taylor Fedun	Princeton University	2 years, $1.565 million entry-level contract
	Tanner House	University of Maine	2 years, $1.2 million
March 31, 2011	Hunter Tremblay	University of New Brunswick	1 year, $565,000 entry-level contract
April 1, 2011	Mark Arcobello	Oklahoma City Barons	2 years, $1.255 million entry-level contract

=== Free agents lost ===
Date	Player	New team	Term
July 6, 2010	Chris Minard	Detroit Red Wings	2 years, $1.05 million
July 7, 2010	Ryan Stone	Calgary Flames	1 year, $500,000
July 23, 2010	Marc-Antoine Pouliot	Tampa Bay Lightning	1 year, $550,000
July 25, 2010	Robert Nilsson	Salavat Yulaev Ufa	undisclosed
	Charles Linglet	Torpedo Nizhny Novgorod	undisclosed
August 11, 2010	Dean Arsene	St. Louis Blues	1 year, $660,000
August 24, 2010	Fernando Pisani	Chicago Blackhawks	1 year, $500,000
August 31, 2010	Aaron Johnson	Nashville Predators	1 year, $555,000
September 3, 2010	Mike Comrie	Pittsburgh Penguins	1 year, $500,000
September 9, 2010	Ryan Potulny	Chicago Blackhawks	1 year, $500,000
October 2, 2010	Geoff Paukovich	Las Vegas Wranglers	
November 19, 2010	Vyacheslav Trukhno	Bakersfield Condors	1 year, undisclosed
December 8, 2010	Bryan Lerg	Wilkes-Barre/Scranton Penguins	

=== Lost via waivers ===
Player	New team	Date claimed off waivers
Ethan Moreau	Columbus Blue Jackets	June 30, 2010

=== Player signings ===
Player	Contract terms
Philippe Cornet	3 years, $1.74 million entry-level contract
Teemu Hartikainen	3 years, $2.625 million entry-level contract
Magnus Paajarvi	3 years, $2.7 million entry-level contract
Colin Fraser	2 years, $1.65 million
Jason Strudwick	1 year, $725,000
Taylor Hall	3 years, $11.25 million entry-level contract
Devan Dubnyk	2 years, $1.6 million
Jean-Francois Jacques	1 year, $615,000
Theo Peckham	1 year, $550,000
Ryan O'Marra	1 year, $700,000
Gilbert Brule	2 years, $3.7 million
Jeff Deslauriers	1 year, $1.05 million
Liam Reddox	1 year, $550,000
Sam Gagner	2 years, $4.55 million
Andrew Cogliano	1 year, $1 million
Olivier Roy	3 years, $1.885 million entry-level contract
Tyler Pitlick	3 years, $2.665 million entry-level contract
Curtis Hamilton	3 years, $2.405 million entry-level contract
Cameron Abney	3 years, $1.74 million entry-level contract
Martin Marincin	3 years, $2.28 million entry-level contract
Anton Lander	3 years, $2.64 million entry-level contract

== Draft picks ==
Edmonton's picks at the 2010 NHL entry draft in Los Angeles, California.

Round	#	Player	Position	Nationality	College/Junior/Club team (League)
1	1	Taylor Hall	(LW)	Canada	Windsor Spitfires (OHL)
2	31	Tyler Pitlick	(C)	United States	Minnesota State University, Mankato (WCHA)
2	46 (from Ottawa via Carolina)	Martin Marincin	(D)	Slovakia	HC Košice (Slovak Extraliga)
2	48 (from Nashville)	Curtis Hamilton	(LW)	Canada	Saskatoon Blades (WHL)
3	61	Ryan Martindale	(C)	Canada	Ottawa 67's (OHL)
4	91	Jeremie Blain	(D)	Canada	Acadie–Bathurst Titan (QMJHL)
5	121	Tyler Bunz	(G)	Canada	Medicine Hat Tigers (WHL)
6	162 (from Anaheim)	Brandon Davidson	(D)	Canada	Regina Pats (WHL)
6	166 (from Ottawa)	Drew Czerwonka	(LW)	Canada	Kootenay Ice (WHL)
7	181	Kristians Pelss	(RW)	Latvia	Dinamo-Juniors Riga (Belarusian Extraleague)
7	202 (from Phoenix via Toronto)	Kellen Jones	(F)	Canada	Vernon Vipers (BCHL)

== Farm teams ==
- The Oilers are affiliated with the Oklahoma City Barons of the American Hockey League and the Stockton Thunder of the ECHL.

== See also ==
- 2010–11 NHL season
