= 2005–06 Edmonton Oilers season =

NHL team season

2005–06 Edmonton Oilers
- Western Conference champions
- Division: 3rd Northwest
- Conference: 8th Western
- 2005–06 record: 41–28–13
- Home record: 20–15–6
- Road record: 21–13–7
- Goals for: 256
- Goals against: 251

Team information
- General manager: Kevin Lowe
- Coach: Craig MacTavish
- Captain: Jason Smith
- Alternate captains: Ethan Moreau; Ryan Smyth
- Arena: Rexall Place
- Average attendance: 16,832 (99.96%)
- Minor league affiliates: Hamilton Bulldogs (AHL); Iowa Stars (AHL); Greenville Grrrowl (ECHL)

Team leaders
- Goals: Ryan Smyth (36)
- Assists: Ales Hemsky (58)
- Points: Ales Hemsky (77)
- Penalty minutes: Ethan Moreau (87)
- Plus/minus: Steve Staios (+10)
- Wins: Jussi Markkanen (15)
- Goals against average: Dwayne Roloson (2.43)

The 2005–06 Edmonton Oilers season was the Oilers' 27th season in the NHL, and they were coming off a 36–29–12–5 record with 89 points and finishing 9th in the Western Conference in 2003–04 and missed the playoffs. In 2005–06, the Oilers qualified for the playoffs in eighth place, and put on a playoff run that brought them to the Stanley Cup Final finishing with a loss in game 7 to the Carolina Hurricanes by a score of 3–1.

This was the first time an eighth-seeded team reached the Stanley Cup Final (which was repeated in 2012, 2017, and 2023). This was the last time the Oilers reached the Stanley Cup Final until 2024.

== Offseason ==
Due to the 2004–05 NHL lockout, the 2004–05 NHL season was cancelled when the players and owners could not agree to a new CBA. The two sides would come to agreement, and there would be many changes for both the Oilers and the NHL as a whole.

The NHL introduced a salary cap of $39 million for the 2005–06, which meant the teams above that figure would cut salary to fit under the cap. The Oilers, who had a lot of cap room, took advantage of this, and the St. Louis Blues would trade former Hart- and Norris Trophy-winning Chris Pronger to the Oilers in exchange for Eric Brewer, Jeff Woywitka and Doug Lynch. Pronger would then sign a five-year, $31.25 million contract with Edmonton. The Oilers would then make another blockbuster trade, this time acquiring former Frank J. Selke Trophy winner Michael Peca from the New York Islanders for Mike York and a fourth-round draft pick.

The NHL also made a number of rule changes, such as adding a shootout to determine the winner of a game that was tied after five minutes of overtime to eliminate ties, goaltenders were not allowed to play the puck in the corners of the ice surface and the referees would crack down on obstruction.

== Regular season ==
The Oilers would start off the season rather slowly, sitting with a 9–9–1 record after 19 games, but the club would get hot, going 21–9–7 in their next 37 games. As the trade deadline approached, the club did not have a clear number one goaltender, and they addressed this issue by trading their first-round draft pick in 2006 to the Minnesota Wild for Dwayne Roloson. Edmonton would also add former Calder Memorial Trophy winner Sergei Samsonov to the club, sending Marty Reasoner, Yan Stastny and a second-round draft pick (Milan Lucic) to the Boston Bruins to acquire him. The Oilers played mediocre hockey for the rest of the season, but nonetheless managed to finish in eighth place in the Western Conference and qualify for the playoffs for the first time since 2003.

Offensively, Ryan Smyth would lead the club with 36 goals, his highest total since scoring 39 goals in 1996–97, and 22-year-old Ales Hemsky would break-out, earning a club-high 58 assists and 77 points. Shawn Horcoff would also have a breakout season, scoring 22 goals and 73 points, as would Jarret Stoll, who scored 22 goals and earned 68 points. On defence, Chris Pronger would anchor the blueline, earning a defenceman-high 56 points, while Marc-Andre Bergeron would score 15 goals and 35 points from the blueline. Ethan Moreau had a club-high 87 penalty minutes.

In goal, Edmonton would use a trio of goaltenders until the arrival of Dwayne Roloson at the trade deadline. Mike Morrison would win ten games and have a 2.83 goals against average (GAA), but he would not last the season with the Oilers; he was claimed off waivers by the Ottawa Senators. Ty Conklin, the starter from 2003 to 2004, would appear in only 18 games, going 8–5–1 with a 2.80 GAA, before being sent to the minors. Jussi Markkanen won a club-high 15 games, and would serve as Dwayne Roloson's backup when the club acquired him. Roloson would post a team-best 2.43 GAA and have an 8–7–4 record with the team.

The Oilers allowed the fewest shorthanded goals in the NHL, with just five.

=== Season standings ===
Northwest Division
No.	CR		GP	W	L	OTL	GF	GA	Pts
1	3	**Calgary Flames**	82	46	25	11	218	200	103
2	7	**Colorado Avalanche**	82	43	30	9	283	257	95
3	8	**Edmonton Oilers**	82	41	28	13	256	251	95
4	9	Vancouver Canucks	82	42	32	8	256	255	92
5	11	Minnesota Wild	82	38	36	8	231	215	84

Note: CR = Conference rank; GP = Games played; W = Wins; L = Losses; T = Ties; OTL = Overtime loss; GF = Goals for; GA = Goals against; Pts = Points
Bolded teams qualified for the playoffs.

Western Conference
R		Div	GP	W	L	OTL	GF	GA	Pts
**1**	**P-** Detroit Red Wings	**CE**	**82**	**58**	**16**	**8**	**305**	**209**	124
**2**	**Y-** Dallas Stars	**PA**	**82**	**53**	**23**	**6**	**265**	**218**	112
**3**	**Y-** Calgary Flames	**NW**	**82**	**46**	**25**	**11**	**218**	**200**	103
**4**	**X-** Nashville Predators	**CE**	**82**	**49**	**25**	**8**	**259**	**227**	106
**5**	**X-** San Jose Sharks	**PA**	**82**	**44**	**27**	**11**	**266**	**242**	99
**6**	**X-** Mighty Ducks of Anaheim	**PA**	**82**	**43**	**27**	**12**	**254**	**229**	98
**7**	**X-** Colorado Avalanche	**NW**	**82**	**43**	**30**	**9**	**283**	**257**	95
**8**	**X-** Edmonton Oilers	**NW**	**82**	**41**	**28**	**13**	**256**	**251**	95
8.5
9	Vancouver Canucks	NW	82	42	32	8	256	255	92
10	Los Angeles Kings	PA	82	42	35	5	249	270	89
11	Minnesota Wild	NW	82	38	36	8	231	215	84
12	Phoenix Coyotes	PA	82	38	39	5	246	271	81
13	Columbus Blue Jackets	CE	82	35	43	4	223	279	74
14	Chicago Blackhawks	CE	82	26	43	13	211	285	65
15	St. Louis Blues	CE	82	21	46	15	197	292	57

Divisions: CE – Central, PA – Pacific, NW – Northwest

P – Clinched Presidents Trophy; Y – Clinched division; X – Clinched playoff spot

== Playoffs ==
Edmonton would open up the playoffs against the Presidents' Trophy winners, the Detroit Red Wings, who finished with 124 points during the season. Hockey experts almost unanimously predicted a Detroit victory; however, the Oilers had played the season in a tougher division than the Red Wings, who played 24 of their 82 games against the Columbus Blue Jackets, Chicago Blackhawks and St. Louis Blues, who had finished 25th, 28th and 30th, respectively, in the standings. In Game 1 at Joe Louis Arena, the Oilers played a tight defensive style and took the Wings to double overtime before losing 3–2, despite being outshot 57–25 in the game. The Oilers tied the series with a solid 4–2 win in Game 2 to return home with a split. Game 3 at Rexall Place saw the Oilers squander a late two-goal lead as the Wings forced the game to double overtime, where the Oilers won on a goal by Jarret Stoll. Game 4 saw the Red Wings score three powerplay goals and tie the series with a 4–2 win, and the teams returned to Detroit for Game 5. With the series tied 2–2, the Oilers jumped out to an early 3–0 lead and hung on for a 3–2 win, behind the strong two-way play of defenceman Chris Pronger. The Oilers returned home looking to complete the upset in Game 6, but fell behind the Red Wings 2–0 by the second intermission. Then the Oilers caught fire in the third period, tying the game on two goals from Fernando Pisani. After the Red Wings scored to re-take the lead, the Oilers again tied the game on a crease-crashing goal from Ales Hemsky. In the final minute of play, Hemsky roofed a pass from Sergei Samsonov behind Detroit goaltender Manny Legace, and the Edmonton crowd exploded in jubilation. The Oilers hung on to win the game 4–3, eliminating the heavily favoured Red Wings in six games. It was the Oilers' first playoff series win since eliminating the Colorado Avalanche in 1998.

The opening round of the 2006 NHL playoffs had an unprecedented development in the Western Conference: in each of the four series played, the team with the lower points total had emerged as the victor. As a result, in the Conference Semifinals, the eighth-place Oilers would face the fifth-place San Jose Sharks, who finished the season with only four more points than Edmonton, at 99. Still, the Sharks were considered a tough opponent, having NHL MVP and scoring leader Joe Thornton, along with League goals leader Jonathan Cheechoo among their stars.

Game 1 at the HP Pavilion ended in a 2–1 San Jose victory as the Sharks executed a physical forechecking gameplan and outshot the Oilers 30–16. In Game 2, the Sharks entered the ice to a cheer that eclipsed 109 decibels, and they rode their fans' emotion to another slim 2–1 victory. The Sharks had taken a two-game lead in the series, but were now missing Milan Michalek, one of their best offensive forwards. Michalek had been blasted in open ice by Oilers' forward Raffi Torres in Game 2. When the teams returned to Rexall Place for Game 3, the Edmonton crowd exploded; the noise in the building eclipsed 114 decibels as the Oilers came onto the ice. The Oilers parlayed the noise into inspired play, running roughshod all over the ice and outshooting the Sharks 15–2 by the end of the first period. Sharks goaltender Vesa Toskala held tough, however, and the Oilers only took a 1–0 lead into the first intermission. By the third period, the Sharks had taken a 2–1 lead, and it stood until Torres tied the game with a wrist-shot as he came down the wing. The game went into overtime, and the Sharks nearly ended it on a 2-on-1 rush, as Thornton passed to Cheechoo for the shot, but Dwayne Roloson dove across the crease and sniped the puck out of mid-air. The game finally ended in the third overtime, as the Oilers' top line of Horcoff, Hemsky and Smyth worked a passing play into the San Jose crease, where Horcoff jammed the puck in the San Jose goal for the Edmonton win. In Game 4 in Edmonton, the Oilers were trailing 3–2 in the second period when Sergei Samsonov's penalty expired and he was sent in alone on Toskala. To everyone's shock, Toskala came charging out of the net to get the puck before Samsonov. Toskala lost the puck and Samsonov slid a backhand into the open net to tie the game. The Edmonton crowd exploded in delight, and the Oilers never looked back, cruising to a 6–3 win. Game 5 in San Jose was the site of an unfortunate incident: the American feed of the Game 4 broadcast in Edmonton had picked up background noise during the playing of the American National Anthem. San Jose fans had thought it was booing, and in Game 5, a majority of San Jose fans booed the entire Canadian National Anthem. The game itself saw the Oilers carry over the momentum they gained from Game 4, and they struck for three powerplay goals and one shorthanded goal en route to another 6–3 win. In Game 6 in Edmonton, the Edmonton crowd loudly cheered the singing of the American anthem, and then joined anthem singer Paul Lorieau in a throaty and passionate rendition of "O Canada." The Oilers picked up where they had left off in the previous game – they stymied the Sharks' high-scoring forwards and Dwayne Roloson made 24 saves for his first career playoff shutout as the Oilers eliminated the Sharks in six games. The Oilers had earned a trip to the Western Conference Finals for the first time since 1991–92.

In the Conference Finals, the Oilers faced the sixth-seeded Mighty Ducks of Anaheim, with the series to open at the Arrowhead Pond. In Game 1, Michael Peca extended his playoff goal-scoring streak to three games, and Roloson stopped 31 of 32 shots as the Oilers stunned the Anaheim crowd into silence with a 3–1 victory. Peca would extend his goal streak in Game 2, scoring an empty-netter as the Oilers again iced the Ducks in their home rink, 3–1. Raffi Torres and Marc-Andre Bergeron missed the game, as a bad flu had hit the Oilers' dressing room. The Oilers returned home with a 2–0 series lead, and the Edmonton fans stole the show in Game 3. The crowd was in bedlam by the time the Oilers hit the ice, prompting TV analyst Don Cherry to scream, "This is unbelievable! I don't know how they can lose with this crowd!" Then during the national anthem, after the opening verse, anthem singer Paul Lorieau spontaneously turned the microphone over to the crowd, who finished the song. It was hailed as one of the most touching moments of the entire year in sports. When the game started, the Mighty Ducks attempted to literally fight their way back into the series, as skirmishes ensued after nearly every whistle. By the end of the first period, the Oilers held a slim 1–0 lead, which held until the third period when the Oilers got goals from Peca, Steve Staios and Chris Pronger. By now, the effects of the flu were noticeable on the Oilers, and late in the game the Ducks fought back to make it close, but the Oilers prevailed with a 5–4 win despite being outshot 38–22. In Game 4, the Mighty Ducks started Jean-Sebastien Giguere for the first time in the playoffs and avoided the series sweep by outskating the Oilers, winning the game 6–3 off the strength of two goals by Dustin Penner. The Ducks again outshot the Oilers 45–23 in the tilt. In Game 5 in Anaheim, the Ducks jumped out to an early 1–0 lead, but second period goals by Torres and Ethan Moreau put the Oilers in front. The Oilers would never relinquish their lead as the Ducks pressed furiously for the equalizer. Edmonton would win the Clarence S. Campbell Bowl for the seventh time in team history and claim the series in five games. The win earned the Oilers their first trip to the Stanley Cup Finals since their last Cup win in 1990.

Edmonton would face the Eastern Conference champion Carolina Hurricanes in the Stanley Cup Final. In the opening game, goaltender Dwayne Roloson would go down to injury midway through the third period with the score tied 4–4, and Ty Conklin came in to replace Roloson. Conklin, however, would allow the winning goal as Carolina won the game 5–4. With Jussi Markkanen starting in Game 2, the Hurricanes dominated the Oilers, winning the game 5–0. Edmonton would rebound in Game 3, playing their first home game in the Stanley Cup Final since May 22, 1990, with a 2–1 victory, but the Hurricanes would take Game 4 2–1 to take a commanding 3–1 series lead. The Oilers, facing elimination, would take Game 5 to overtime, and eventually win 4–3 score to stay alive in the series. The series then returned to Edmonton for Game 6, and the Oilers shut out Carolina 4–0, setting up the Stanley Cup-deciding Game 7. The Hurricanes, led by goaltender Cam Ward, played a solid defensive game and held the Oilers to just a single goal (scored by Fernando Pisani, his 14th of the playoffs), while the Hurricanes managed to put two behind Jussi Markkanen, as well as score an empty-netter, to seal the game and their first Stanley Cup victory in team history.

=== Blue Mile ===
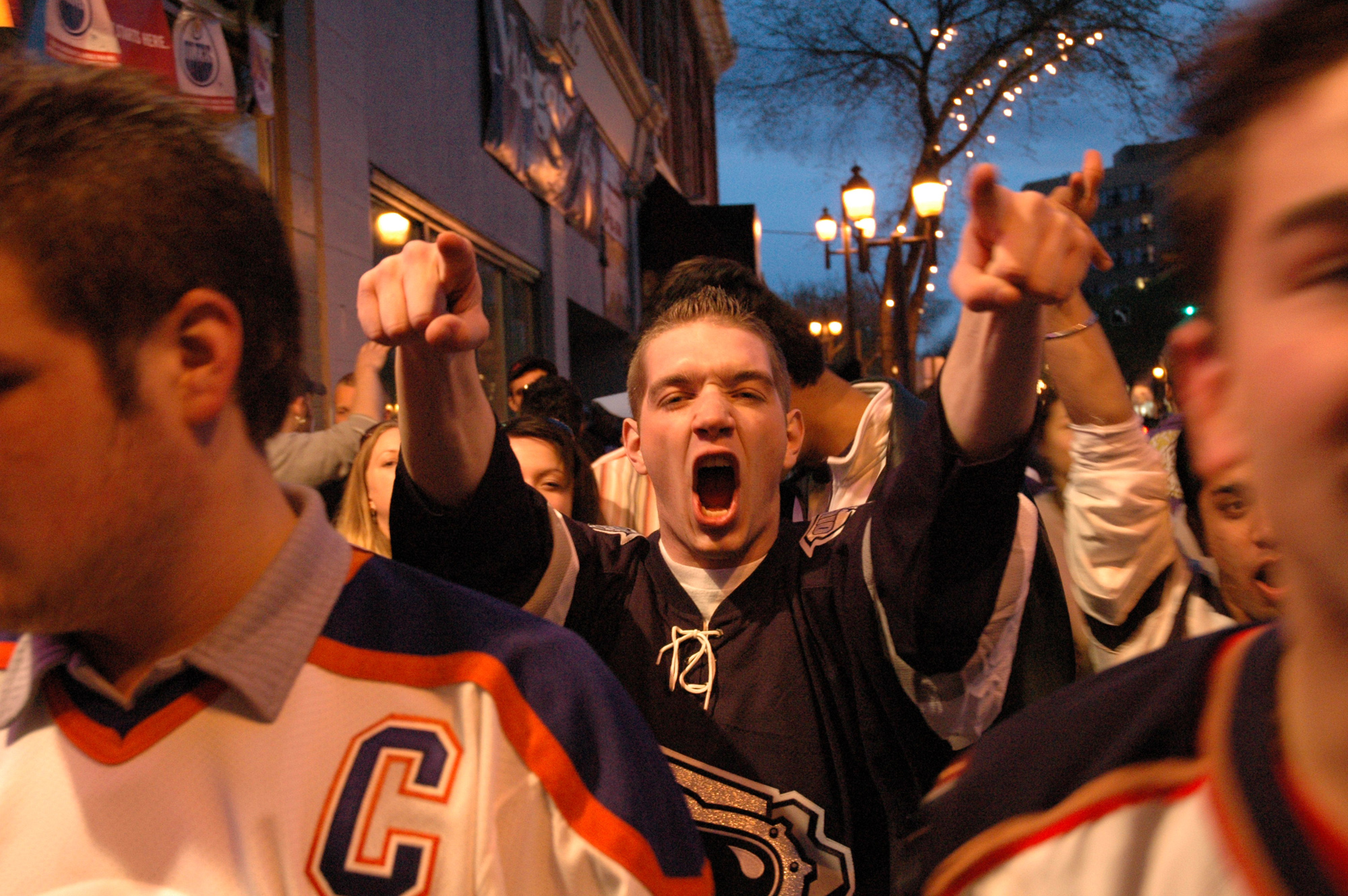
Oiler fans, unable to enter the jam-packed Rexall Place, celebrate on Edmonton's Whyte Avenue during the 2006 Stanley Cup Playoffs.

The Blue Mile or the Copper Kilometre is the name given by the local media to the Old Strathcona District's Whyte Avenue during the Edmonton Oilers 2006 Stanley Cup playoff run, since it closely resembled the events which took place on the Red Mile in Calgary two years prior.

Following the Edmonton Oilers upset victory over the Detroit Red Wings in the first round of the 2006 playoffs, several thousand Oiler fans flocked to Whyte Avenue and turned the district into a hockey party strip, as Oiler fans walked the streets cheering, chanting, high-fiving, horn-honking, and flag-waving for their team. Others surfed the crowd in a grocery-shopping cart, and still others climbed trees and traffic lights.

Whyte Avenue in Edmonton gained national attention for its level of violence in May 2006. The arrests at the Blue Mile are estimated at least 350 people through the Oilers Stanley Cup playoff run, including breaching the public peace, assaults, impaired driving, mischief, and alcohol-related offences. This rowdy behaviour led the mayor of Edmonton, Stephen Mandel, to threaten to close down the strip: "I hope this doesn't come down to having to shut down Whyte completely...but this will not be tolerated going into the final series."

== Schedule and results ==
=== Regular season ===
2005–06 regular season
October: 5–6–1 (home: 2–2–1; road: 3–4–0)

#	Date	Visitor	Score	Home	OT	Decision	Attendance	Record	Pts	Recap
1	October 5	Colorado Avalanche	3–4	Edmonton Oilers		Conklin	16,839	1–0–0	2	W
2	October 8	Vancouver Canucks	3–4	Edmonton Oilers	SO	Markkanen	16,839	2–0–0	4	W
3	October 10	Edmonton Oilers	4–2	Mighty Ducks of Anaheim		Markkanen	17,174	3–0–0	6	W
4	October 11	Edmonton Oilers	1–3	Los Angeles Kings		Conklin	16,394	3–1–0	6	L
5	October 14	Dallas Stars	3–2	Edmonton Oilers		Markkanen	16,839	3–2–0	6	L
6	October 15	Edmonton Oilers	0–3	Calgary Flames		Markkanen	19,289	3–3–0	6	L
7	October 18	Phoenix Coyotes	4–3	Edmonton Oilers	OT	Markkanen	16,839	3–3–1	7	OTL
8	October 20	Edmonton Oilers	1–3	Calgary Flames		Markkanen	19,289	3–4–1	7	L
9	October 21	Colorado Avalanche	7–1	Edmonton Oilers		Markkanen	16,839	3–5–1	7	L
10	October 25	Edmonton Oilers	3–5	Colorado Avalanche		Markkanen	18,007	3–6–1	7	L
11	October 28	Edmonton Oilers	5–3	Dallas Stars		Markkanen	16,342	4–6–1	9	W
12	October 29	Edmonton Oilers	5–1	Nashville Predators		Markkanen	14,610	5–6–1	11	W

November: 9–5–0 (home: 3–2–0; road: 6–3–0)

#	Date	Visitor	Score	Home	OT	Decision	Attendance	Record	Pts	Recap
13	November 1	Columbus Blue Jackets	1–5	Edmonton Oilers		Markkanen	16,839	6–6–1	13	W
14	November 3	Edmonton Oilers	4–3	Detroit Red Wings	OT	Markkanen	20,066	7–6–1	15	W
15	November 4	Edmonton Oilers	7–2	St. Louis Blues		Markkanen	13,626	8–6–1	17	W
16	November 7	Edmonton Oilers	0–4	Dallas Stars		Markkanen	15,286	8–7–1	17	L
17	November 8	Edmonton Oilers	2–3	Nashville Predators		Markkanen	11,748	8–8–1	17	L
18	November 11	Edmonton Oilers	3–1	Columbus Blue Jackets		Markkanen	18,136	9–8–1	19	W
19	November 13	Edmonton Oilers	1–3	Chicago Blackhawks		Markkanen	15,299	9–9–1	19	L
20	November 14	Edmonton Oilers	5–2	Colorado Avalanche		Morrison	18,007	10–9–1	21	W
21	November 17	Detroit Red Wings	5–6	Edmonton Oilers	OT	Markkanen	16,839	11–9–1	23	W
22	November 19	Chicago Blackhawks	4–3	Edmonton Oilers		Markkanen	16,839	11–10–1	23	L
23	November 21	San Jose Sharks	1–2	Edmonton Oilers	SO	Morrison	16,583	12–10–1	25	W
24	November 23	Edmonton Oilers	4–3	Minnesota Wild		Morrison	18,568	13–10–1	27	W
25	November 25	Edmonton Oilers	2–1	Calgary Flames	SO	Morrison	19,289	14–10–1	29	W
26	November 29	Colorado Avalanche	3–2	Edmonton Oilers		Morrison	16,839	14–11–1	29	L

December: 8–3–3 (home: 5–2–1; road: 3–1–2)

#	Date	Visitor	Score	Home	OT	Decision	Attendance	Record	Pts	Recap
27	December 1	Vancouver Canucks	3–5	Edmonton Oilers		Markkanen	16,839	15–11–1	31	W
28	December 3	Boston Bruins	5–4	Edmonton Oilers	OT	Markkanen	16,839	15–11–2	32	OTL
29	December 8	Edmonton Oilers	3–2	Philadelphia Flyers		Morrison	19,411	16–11–2	34	W
30	December 10	Edmonton Oilers	2–3	New York Islanders	SO	Markkanen	12,249	16–11–3	35	OTL
31	December 13	Edmonton Oilers	1–2	New Jersey Devils	SO	Conklin	13,507	16–11–4	36	OTL
32	December 15	Montreal Canadiens	3–5	Edmonton Oilers		Conklin	16,839	17–11–4	38	W
33	December 17	Edmonton Oilers	5–4	Vancouver Canucks	OT	Markkanen	18,630	18–11–4	40	W
34	December 19	Calgary Flames	4–5	Edmonton Oilers		Markkanen	16,839	19–11–4	42	W
35	December 21	Edmonton Oilers	7–6	Vancouver Canucks		Conklin	18,630	20–11–4	44	W
36	December 23	Los Angeles Kings	3–5	Edmonton Oilers		Conklin	16,839	21–11–4	46	W
37	December 26	Minnesota Wild	4–1	Edmonton Oilers		Conklin	16,839	21–12–4	46	L
38	December 28	Minnesota Wild	4–2	Edmonton Oilers		Conklin	16,839	21–13–4	46	L
39	December 30	Nashville Predators	2–4	Edmonton Oilers		Markkanen	16,839	22–13–4	48	W
40	December 31	Edmonton Oilers	5–6	Calgary Flames		Markkanen	19,289	22–14–4	48	L

January: 6–4–2 (home: 1–4–0; road: 5–0–2)

#	Date	Visitor	Score	Home	OT	Decision	Attendance	Record	Pts	Recap
41	January 3	Chicago Blackhawks	0–5	Edmonton Oilers		Conklin	16,839	23–14–4	50	W
42	January 7	Toronto Maple Leafs	3–2	Edmonton Oilers		Conklin	16,839	23–15–4	50	L
43	January 10	Edmonton Oilers	3–1	Pittsburgh Penguins		Markkanen	14,905	24–15–4	52	W
44	January 12	Edmonton Oilers	4–5	New York Rangers	OT	Markkanen	18,200	24–15–5	53	OTL
45	January 14	Ottawa Senators	5–3	Edmonton Oilers		Conklin	16,839	24–16–5	53	L
46	January 16	Buffalo Sabres	3–1	Edmonton Oilers		Markkanen	16,839	24–17–5	53	L
47	January 19	Edmonton Oilers	3–2	San Jose Sharks	SO	Morrison	15,683	25–17–5	55	W
48	January 21	Edmonton Oilers	3–4	Phoenix Coyotes	OT	Markkanen	17,799	25–17–6	56	OTL
49	January 23	Calgary Flames	3–1	Edmonton Oilers		Morrison	16,839	25–18–6	56	L
50	January 25	Edmonton Oilers	6–3	Mighty Ducks of Anaheim		Markkanen	14,456	26–18–6	58	W
51	January 26	Edmonton Oilers	5–3	Los Angeles Kings		Morrison	18,118	27–18–6	60	W
52	January 29	Edmonton Oilers	4–3	Phoenix Coyotes	SO	Morrison	16,153	28–18–6	62	W

February: 2–2–2 (home: 2–1–2; road: 0–1–0)

#	Date	Visitor	Score	Home	OT	Decision	Attendance	Record	Pts	Recap
53	February 2	Columbus Blue Jackets	2–1	Edmonton Oilers	SO	Markkanen	16,839	28–18–7	63	OTL
54	February 4	Vancouver Canucks	1–3	Edmonton Oilers		Morrison	16,839	29–18–7	65	W
55	February 6	Mighty Ducks of Anaheim	5–6	Edmonton Oilers	SO	Morrison	16,839	30–18–7	67	W
56	February 7	Edmonton Oilers	2–5	Colorado Avalanche		Morrison	18,007	30–19–7	67	L
57	February 10	Minnesota Wild	6–3	Edmonton Oilers		Morrison	16,839	30–20–7	67	L
58	February 12	St. Louis Blues	5–4	Edmonton Oilers	SO	Morrison	16,839	30–20–8	68	OTL

March: 7–5–4 (home: 4–3–2; road: 3–2–2)

#	Date	Visitor	Score	Home	OT	Decision	Attendance	Record	Pts	Recap
59	March 1	St. Louis Blues	4–2	Edmonton Oilers		Markkanen	16,839	30–21–8	68	L
60	March 3	San Jose Sharks	2–3	Edmonton Oilers		Conklin	16,839	31–21–8	70	W
61	March 5	Nashville Predators	2–3	Edmonton Oilers	OT	Conklin	16,839	32–21–8	72	W
62	March 7	Dallas Stars	4–3	Edmonton Oilers	SO	Morrison	16,839	32–21–9	73	OTL
63	March 9	Edmonton Oilers	2–5	San Jose Sharks		Roloson	15,878	32–22–9	73	L
64	March 11	Edmonton Oilers	3–4	Columbus Blue Jackets	OT	Roloson	18,136	32–22–10	74	OTL
65	March 12	Edmonton Oilers	3–4	Minnesota Wild		Roloson	18,568	32–23–10	74	L
66	March 14	Edmonton Oilers	2–1	Minnesota Wild		Roloson	18,568	33–23–10	76	W
67	March 16	Calgary Flames	2–3	Edmonton Oilers	OT	Roloson	16,839	34–23–10	78	W
68	March 18	Detroit Red Wings	4–3	Edmonton Oilers	SO	Roloson	16,839	34–23–11	79	OTL
69	March 21	Vancouver Canucks	4–1	Edmonton Oilers		Roloson	16,839	34–24–11	79	L
70	March 23	Edmonton Oilers	3–4	Vancouver Canucks	SO	Roloson	18,630	34–24–12	80	OTL
71	March 25	Edmonton Oilers	3–2	Vancouver Canucks		Roloson	18,630	35–24–12	82	W
72	March 26	Edmonton Oilers	4–3	Colorado Avalanche	SO	Roloson	18,007	36–24–12	84	W
73	March 28	Minnesota Wild	3–2	Edmonton Oilers		Roloson	16,839	36–25–12	84	L
74	March 30	Los Angeles Kings	0–4	Edmonton Oilers		Roloson	16,839	37–25–12	86	W

April: 4–3–1 (home: 3–1–0; road: 1–2–1)

#	Date	Visitor	Score	Home	OT	Decision	Attendance	Record	Pts	Recap
75	April 1	Calgary Flames	4–1	Edmonton Oilers		Roloson	16,839	37–26–12	86	L
76	April 3	Phoenix Coyotes	1–7	Edmonton Oilers		Roloson	16,839	38–26–12	88	W
77	April 6	Edmonton Oilers	1–2	Minnesota Wild	SO	Roloson	18,568	38–26–13	89	OTL
78	April 7	Edmonton Oilers	4–3	Chicago Blackhawks	OT	Roloson	14,280	39–26–13	91	W
79	April 9	Edmonton Oilers	1–2	St. Louis Blues		Roloson	19,090	39–27–13	91	L
80	April 11	Edmonton Oilers	0–2	Detroit Red Wings		Roloson	20,066	39–28–13	91	L
81	April 13	Mighty Ducks of Anaheim	1–2	Edmonton Oilers		Roloson	16,839	40–28–13	93	W
82	April 17	Colorado Avalanche	2–4	Edmonton Oilers		Conklin	16,839	41–28–13	95	W

Legend: W Win (2 points) L Loss (0 points) OTL Overtime/shootout loss (1 point)

=== Playoffs ===
2006 Stanley Cup playoffs
Western Conference Quarterfinals vs. (1) Detroit Red Wings – Oilers win 4–2

#	Date	Visitor	Score	Home	OT	Decision	Attendance	Series	Recap
1	April 21	Edmonton Oilers	2–3	Detroit Red Wings	2OT	Roloson	20,066	0–1	L
2	April 23	Edmonton Oilers	4–2	Detroit Red Wings		Roloson	20,066	1–1	W
3	April 25	Detroit Red Wings	3–4	Edmonton Oilers	2OT	Roloson	16,839	2–1	W
4	April 27	Detroit Red Wings	4–2	Edmonton Oilers		Roloson	16,839	2–2	L
5	April 29	Edmonton Oilers	3–2	Detroit Red Wings		Roloson	20,066	3–2	W
6	May 1	Detroit Red Wings	3–4	Edmonton Oilers		Roloson	16,839	4–2	W

Western Conference Semifinals vs. (5) San Jose Sharks – Oilers win 4–2

#	Date	Visitor	Score	Home	OT	Decision	Attendance	Series	Recap
1	May 7	Edmonton Oilers	1–2	San Jose Sharks		Roloson	17,496	0–1	L
2	May 8	Edmonton Oilers	1–2	San Jose Sharks		Roloson	17,496	0–2	L
3	May 10	San Jose Sharks	2–3	Edmonton Oilers	3OT	Roloson	16,839	1–2	W
4	May 12	San Jose Sharks	3–6	Edmonton Oilers		Roloson	16,839	2–2	W
5	May 14	Edmonton Oilers	6–3	San Jose Sharks		Roloson	17,496	3–2	W
6	May 17	San Jose Sharks	0–2	Edmonton Oilers		Roloson	16,839	4–2	W

Western Conference Finals vs. (6) Mighty Ducks of Anaheim – Oilers win 4–1

#	Date	Visitor	Score	Home	OT	Decision	Attendance	Series	Recap
1	May 19	Edmonton Oilers	3–1	Mighty Ducks of Anaheim		Roloson	17,174	1–0	W
2	May 21	Edmonton Oilers	3–1	Mighty Ducks of Anaheim		Roloson	17,264	2–0	W
3	May 23	Mighty Ducks of Anaheim	4–5	Edmonton Oilers		Roloson	16,839	3–0	W
4	May 25	Mighty Ducks of Anaheim	6–3	Edmonton Oilers		Roloson	16,839	3–1	L
5	May 27	Edmonton Oilers	2–1	Mighty Ducks of Anaheim		Roloson	17,174	4–1	W

Stanley Cup Final vs. (E2) Carolina Hurricanes – Hurricanes win 4–3

#	Date	Visitor	Score	Home	OT	Decision	Attendance	Series	Recap
1	June 5	Edmonton Oilers	4–5	Carolina Hurricanes		Conklin	18,797	0–1	L
2	June 7	Edmonton Oilers	0–5	Carolina Hurricanes		Markkanen	18,928	0–2	L
3	June 10	Carolina Hurricanes	1–2	Edmonton Oilers		Markkanen	16,839	1–2	W
4	June 12	Carolina Hurricanes	2–1	Edmonton Oilers		Markkanen	16,839	1–3	L
5	June 14	Edmonton Oilers	4–3	Carolina Hurricanes	OT	Markkanen	18,974	2–3	W
6	June 17	Carolina Hurricanes	0–4	Edmonton Oilers		Markkanen	16,839	3–3	W
7	June 19	Edmonton Oilers	1–3	Carolina Hurricanes		Markkanen	18,978	3–4	L

Legend: W Win L Loss

== Player statistics ==
=== Scoring ===
- Position abbreviations: C = Centre; D = Defence; G = Goaltender; LW = Left wing; RW = Right wing
- † = Joined team via a transaction (e.g., trade, waivers, signing) during the season. Stats reflect time with the Oilers only.
- ‡ = Left team via a transaction (e.g., trade, waivers, release) during the season. Stats reflect time with the Oilers only.

No.	Player	Pos	Regular season						Playoffs					
No.	Player	Pos	GP	G	A	Pts	+/-	PIM	GP	G	A	Pts	+/-	PIM
83	Ales Hemsky	RW	81	19	58	77	−5	64	24	6	11	17	−3	14
10	Shawn Horcoff	C	79	22	51	73	0	85	24	7	12	19	4	12
16	Jarret Stoll	C	82	22	46	68	4	74	24	4	6	10	−4	24
94	Ryan Smyth	LW	75	36	30	66	−5	58	24	7	9	16	−2	22
44	Chris Pronger	D	80	12	44	56	2	74	24	5	16	21	10	26
14	Raffi Torres	LW	82	27	14	41	4	50	22	4	7	11	2	16
34	Fernando Pisani	RW	80	18	19	37	5	42	24	14	4	18	4	10
47	Marc-Andre Bergeron	D	75	15	20	35	3	38	18	2	1	3	0	14
20	Radek Dvorak	RW	64	8	20	28	−2	26	16	0	2	2	−1	4
24	Steve Staios	D	82	8	20	28	10	84	24	1	5	6	0	28
18	Ethan Moreau	LW	74	11	16	27	6	87	21	2	1	3	0	19
19	Marty Reasoner‡	C	58	9	17	26	−12	20	—	—	—	—	—	—
37	Michael Peca	C	71	9	14	23	−4	56	24	6	5	11	5	20
6	Jaroslav Spacek†	D	31	5	14	19	3	24	24	3	11	14	−3	24
21	Jason Smith	D	76	4	13	17	1	84	24	1	4	5	5	16
12	Sergei Samsonov†	LW	19	5	11	16	0	6	24	4	11	15	2	14
27	Georges Laraque	RW	72	2	10	12	−5	73	15	1	1	2	2	44
55	Igor Ulanov	D	37	3	6	9	−11	29	—	—	—	—	—	—
13	Todd Harvey	RW	63	5	2	7	−7	32	10	1	1	2	0	4
23	Cory Cross‡	D	34	2	3	5	−5	38	—	—	—	—	—	—
23 (Note: Tarnstrom wore number 33 in his first game.)	Dick Tarnstrom†	D	22	1	3	4	−5	24	12	0	2	2	1	10
22	Jani Rita‡	LW	21	3	0	3	0	6	—	—	—	—	—	—
22	Rem Murray†	C	9	1	1	2	1	2	24	0	4	4	0	2
5	Alexei Semenov‡	D	11	1	1	2	−3	17	—	—	—	—	—	—
2 (Note: Greene wore number 32 in his first 13 games.)	Matt Greene	D	27	0	2	2	−6	43	18	0	1	1	1	34
36	Marc-Antoine Pouliot	C	8	1	0	1	1	0	—	—	—	—	—	—
30	Jussi Markkanen	G	37	0	1	1		0	6	0	0	0		0
35	Dwayne Roloson†	G	19	0	1	1		2	18	0	2	2		14
26	Brad Winchester	LW	19	0	1	1	−2	21	10	1	2	3	−2	4
15	Kyle Brodziak	C	10	0	0	0	−4	4	—	—	—	—	—	—
29	Ty Conklin	G	18	0	0	0		2	1	0	0	0		0
41	Jean-Francois Jacques	LW	7	0	0	0	−3	0	—	—	—	—	—	—
12 (Note: Kolanos wore number 25 in his first game.)	Krys Kolanos†‡	C	6	0	0	0	−1	2	—	—	—	—	—	—
1	Mike Morrison‡	G	21	0	0	0		2	—	—	—	—	—	—
12	Mathieu Roy	D	1	0	0	0	−1	0	—	—	—	—	—	—
6	Dan Smith	D	7	0	0	0	1	7	—	—	—	—	—	—
42	Yan Stastny‡	C	3	0	0	0	−2	0	—	—	—	—	—	—
28	Danny Syvret	D	10	0	0	0	−1	6	—	—	—	—	—	—
45	Toby Petersen	C	—	—	—	—	—	—	2	1	0	1	1	0

=== Goaltending ===
- † = Joined team via a transaction (e.g., trade, waivers, signing) during the season. Stats reflect time with the Oilers only.
- ‡ = Left team via a transaction (e.g., trade, waivers, release) during the season. Stats reflect time with the Oilers only.

No.	Player	Regular season										Playoffs								
No.	Player	GP	W	L	OT	SA	GA	GAA	SV%	SO	TOI	GP	W	L	SA	GA	GAA	SV%	SO	TOI
30	Jussi Markkanen	37	15	12	6	873	105	3.12	.880	0	2016	6	3	3	137	13	2.17	.905	1	360
1	Mike Morrison‡	21	10	4	2	361	42	2.83	.884	0	892	–	–	–	–	–	–	–	–	–
29	Ty Conklin	18	8	5	1	359	43	2.80	.880	1	922	1	0	1	3	1	10.00	.667	0	6
35	Dwayne Roloson†	19	8	7	4	497	47	2.42	.905	1	1163	18	12	5	618	45	2.33	.927	1	1160

== Awards and records ==
=== Awards ===
Type	Award/honour	Recipient	Ref
League (in-season)	NHL Defensive Player of the Week	Mike Morrison (November 28)	
Team	Community Service Award	Georges Laraque	
Team	Defenceman of the Year	Chris Pronger	
Team	Molson Cup	Ryan Smyth	
Team	Most Popular Player	Ryan Smyth	
Team	Top Defensive Forward	Ethan Moreau	
Team	Top First Year Oiler	Matt Greene	
Team	Unsung Hero	Fernando Pisani	
Team	Zane Feldman Trophy	Chris Pronger	

=== Milestones ===
Regular season
Player	Milestone	Reached
Chris Pronger	1,100th NHL PIM	October 10, 2005
Brad Winchester	1st NHL Game	October 10, 2005
Matt Greene	1st NHL Game	October 11, 2005
Kyle Brodziak	1st NHL Game	October 15, 2005
Marty Reasoner	100th NHL Point	October 18, 2005
Jason Smith	100th NHL Assist	October 20, 2005
Alexei Semenov	100th NHL PIM	October 21, 2005
Matt Greene	1st NHL Assist; 1st NHL Point	October 27, 2005
Ethan Moreau	200th NHL Point	October 28, 2005
Jason Smith	800th NHL PIM	October 28, 2005
Ryan Smyth	200th NHL Goal	October 28, 2005
Georges Laraque	100th NHL Point	November 1, 2005
Alexei Semenov	100th NHL Game	November 3, 2005
Danny Syvret	1st NHL Game	November 4, 2005
Mike Morrison	1st NHL Game	November 7, 2005
Radek Dvorak	700th NHL Game	November 11, 2005
Steve Staios	800th NHL PIM	November 13, 2005
Mike Morrison	1st NHL Win	November 14, 2005
Jarret Stoll	100th NHL Game	December 3, 2005
Raffi Torres	100th NHL PIM	December 15, 2005
Ethan Moreau	100th NHL Assist	December 17, 2005
Shawn Horcoff	300th NHL Game	December 19, 2005
Shawn Horcoff	200th NHL PIM	December 23, 2005
Ales Hemsky	100th NHL Point	December 28, 2005
Shawn Horcoff	1st NHL Hat-trick	January 10, 2006
Marc-Andre Bergeron	100th NHL Game	January 12, 2006
Marc-Andre Bergeron	1st NHL Hat-trick	January 14, 2006
Shawn Horcoff	100th NHL Assist	January 14, 2006
Jussi Markkanen	100th NHL Game	January 16, 2006
Michael Peca	600th NHL PIM	January 16, 2006
Radek Dvorak	400th NHL Point	January 19, 2006
Chris Pronger	100th NHL Goal	January 25, 2006
Jean-Francois Jacques	1st NHL Game	February 2, 2006
Steve Staios	100th NHL Assist	February 6, 2006
Georges Laraque	800th NHL PIM	February 10, 2006
Mathieu Roy	1st NHL Game	February 12, 2006
Yan Stastny	1st NHL Game	March 1, 2006
Steve Staios	600th NHL Game	March 9, 2006
Ryan Smyth	700th NHL Game	March 11, 2006
Jarret Stoll	100th NHL PIM	March 11, 2006
Ales Hemsky	200th NHL Game	March 23, 2006
Marc Pouliot	1st NHL Game	March 30, 2006
Jaroslav Spacek	200th NHL Point	March 30, 2006
Ales Hemsky	100th NHL Assist	April 1, 2006
Marc Pouliot	1st NHL Goal; 1st NHL Point	April 3, 2006
Brad Winchester	1st NHL Assist; 1st NHL Point	April 3, 2006
Dick Tarnstrom	200th NHL PIM	April 7, 2006
Chris Pronger	800th NHL Game	April 9, 2006

Playoffs
Player	Milestone	Reached
Ales Hemsky	1st NHL Assist; 1st NHL Point	April 21, 2006
Jaroslav Spacek	1st NHL Assist; 1st NHL Point	April 21, 2006
Jarret Stoll	1st NHL Game	April 21, 2006
Raffi Torres	1st NHL Game	April 21, 2006
Fernando Pisani	1st NHL Assist	April 23, 2006
Steve Staios	1st NHL Assist; 1st NHL Point	April 23, 2006
Jarret Stoll	1st NHL Goal; 1st NHL Point	April 23, 2006
Brad Winchester	1st NHL Game; 1st NHL Goal; 1st NHL Point	April 23, 2006
Jaroslav Spacek	1st NHL Goal	April 25, 2006
Raffi Torres	1st NHL Goal; 1st NHL Point	April 25, 2006
Matt Greene	1st NHL Game	April 27, 2006
Raffi Torres	1st NHL Assist	April 27, 2006
Jarret Stoll	1st NHL Assist	April 29, 2006
Ales Hemsky	1st NHL Goal	May 1, 2006
Ryan Smyth	50th NHL Game	May 1, 2006
Marc-Andre Bergeron	1st NHL Goal	May 10, 2006
Jason Smith	1st NHL Goal	May 12, 2006
Chris Pronger	50th NHL Assist	May 14, 2006
Rem Murray	50th NHL Game	May 17, 2006
Dwayne Roloson	1st NHL Shutout	May 17, 2006
Todd Harvey	50th NHL PIM	May 19, 2006
Dwayne Roloson	1st NHL Assist	May 19, 2006
Toby Petersen	1st NHL Goal; 1st NHL Point	May 23, 2006
Chris Pronger	100th NHL Game	May 23, 2006
Sergei Samsonov	50th NHL Game	May 23, 2006
Steve Staios	1st NHL Goal	May 23, 2006
Jason Smith	50th NHL PIM	May 25, 2006
Ty Conklin	1st NHL Game	June 5, 2006
Matt Greene	1st NHL assist 1st NHL point	June 5, 2006
Georges Laraque	50th NHL PIM	June 7, 2006
Ethan Moreau	50th NHL PIM	June 7, 2006
Jussi Markkanen	1st NHL Win	June 10, 2006
Dick Tarnstrom	1st NHL Assist; 1st NHL Point	June 14, 2006
Jussi Markkanen	1st NHL Shutout	June 17, 2006
Jason Smith	50th NHL Game	June 17, 2006

== Transactions ==
The Oilers were involved in the following transactions from February 17, 2005, the day after the 2004–05 NHL season was officially cancelled, through June 19, 2006, the day of the deciding game of the 2006 Stanley Cup Final.

=== Trades ===
Date	Details		Ref
August 1, 2005	To Boston Bruins: Brad Isbister	To Edmonton Oilers: 4th-round pick in 2006	
August 2, 2005	To St. Louis Blues: Eric Brewer; Doug Lynch; Jeff Woywitka	To Edmonton Oilers: Chris Pronger	
August 3, 2005	To New York Islanders: Mike York; 4th-round pick in 2006	To Edmonton Oilers: Michael Peca	
August 30, 2005	To Boston Bruins: Boston’s 4th-round pick in 2006	To Edmonton Oilers: Rights to Yan Stastny	
November 19, 2005	To Florida Panthers: Alexei Semenov	To Edmonton Oilers: Conditional draft pick in 2006 (Note: 5th-round pick)	
December 13, 2005	To St. Louis Blues: Future considerations	To Edmonton Oilers: Blake Evans	
January 26, 2006	To Pittsburgh Penguins: Cory Cross; Jani Rita	To Edmonton Oilers: Dick Tarnstrom	
January 26, 2006	To Chicago Blackhawks: Rights to Tony Salmelainen	To Edmonton Oilers: Jaroslav Spacek	
March 8, 2006	To Minnesota Wild: 1st-round pick in 2006; Conditional 3rd-round pick in 2007 (Note: Minnesota would receive the pick if the Oilers re-signed Roloson, which they did on July 1, 2006.)	To Edmonton Oilers: Dwayne Roloson	
March 9, 2006	To Boston Bruins: Marty Reasoner; Yan Stastny; 2nd-round pick in 2006	To Edmonton Oilers: Sergei Samsonov	

=== Players acquired ===
Date	Player	Former team	Term	Via	Ref
November 11, 2005	Krys Kolanos	Phoenix Coyotes		Waivers	
March 5, 2006	Rem Murray	Houston Aeros (AHL)	1-year	Free agency	
May 31, 2006	Patrick Thoresen	Djurgardens IF (SHL)	2-year	Free agency	

=== Players lost ===
Date	Player	New team	Via (Note: In parentheses is the player's free agency group on August 1 if applicable.)	Ref
April 21, 2005	Tony Salmelainen	HIFK (Liiga)	Free agency (II) (Note: Edmonton retained Salmelainen’s NHL rights until trading them to Chicago on January 26, 2006.)	
July 30, 2005	Tyler Moss	HC Spartak Moscow (RSL)	Free agency (VI)	
August 3, 2005	Jamie Wright	Lukko (Liiga)	Free agency (UFA)	
September 14, 2005	Sean McAslan	Long Beach Ice Dogs (ECHL)	Free agency (VI)	
September 14, 2005	Rocky Thompson	Peoria Rivermen (AHL)	Free agency (VI)	
September 17, 2005	Joe Cullen	Ottawa Senators	Free agency (UFA)	
September 19, 2005	Mike Bishai	Phoenix Coyotes	Free agency (UFA)	
December 19, 2005	Krys Kolanos	Phoenix Coyotes	Waivers	
March 9, 2006	Mike Morrison	Ottawa Senators	Waivers	

=== Signings ===
Date	Player	Term	Contract type	Ref
August 3, 2005	Chris Pronger	5-year	Re-signing	
August 5, 2005	Jussi Markkanen	2-year	Re-signing	
August 5, 2005	Igor Ulanov	1-year	Re-signing	
August 9, 2005	Marty Reasoner	1-year	Re-signing	
August 9, 2005	Dan Smith	1-year	Re-signing	
August 10, 2005	Jani Rita	2-year	Re-signing	
August 10, 2005	Jarret Stoll	1-year	Re-signing	
August 10, 2005	Brad Winchester	2-year	Re-signing	
August 15, 2005	Ales Hemsky	1-year	Re-signing	
August 16, 2005	Matt Greene	2-year	Entry-level	
August 16, 2005	Raffi Torres	2-year	Re-signing	
August 19, 2005	Shawn Horcoff	1-year	Re-signing	
August 29, 2005	Danny Syvret	3-year	Entry-level	
August 30, 2005	Yan Stastny	2-year	Re-signing	
September 11, 2005	Mike Morrison	1-year	Re-signing	
September 14, 2005	Ryan Smyth	2-year	Re-signing	
October 7, 2005	Rob Schremp	3-year	Entry-level	
May 1, 2006	Tyler Spurgeon	3-year	Entry-level	
May 24, 2006	Devan Dubnyk	3-year	Entry-level	
May 31, 2006	Stephane Goulet	3-year	Entry-level	
May 31, 2006	Bryan Young	3-year	Entry-level	
June 1, 2006	Jonas Almtorp	2-year	Entry-level	
June 1, 2006	Fredrik Johansson	2-year	Entry-level	
June 1, 2006	Liam Reddox	3-year	Entry-level	

== Draft picks ==
Edmonton's draft picks at the 2005 NHL entry draft.

Round	#	Player	Nationality	NHL team	College/Junior/Club team (League)
1	25	Andrew Cogliano	Canada	Edmonton Oilers	St. Michael's Buzzers (OPJHL)
2	36	Taylor Chorney	United States	Edmonton Oilers	Shattuck-Saint Mary's School (Midget Major AAA)
3	81	Danny Syvret	Canada	Edmonton Oilers (from Philadelphia Flyers)	London Knights (OHL)
3	86	Robby Dee	United States	Edmonton Oilers	Breck School (USHS)
4	97	Chris VandeVelde	United States	Edmonton Oilers	Lincoln Stars (USHL)
4	120	Vyacheslav Trukhno	Russia	Edmonton Oilers	Prince Edward Island Rocket (QMJHL)
5	157	Fredrik Pettersson	Sweden	Edmonton Oilers	Frolunda HC (Sweden)
7	220	Matthew Glasser	Canada	Edmonton Oilers	Fort McMurray Oil Barons (AJHL)

== Farm teams ==
Hamilton Bulldogs (AHL)

== See also ==
- 2005–06 NHL season
