= List of Edmonton Oilers seasons =

The Edmonton Oilers are a professional ice hockey team based in Edmonton. The team is a member of the Pacific Division of the Western Conference of the National Hockey League (NHL).

The Oilers began as a charter member of the World Hockey Association (WHA) in 1972, and were known as the Alberta Oilers for their first season after their Calgary counterparts were unable to play. The Oilers were a middle of the road team, failing to win a single playoff series until their seventh, and final, season in the WHA. In that last year, the Oilers lost to the (Jets) in the last Avco World Trophy final.

In 1979, the Oilers, along with the Jets, the Hartford Whalers and the Quebec Nordiques joined the NHL following the dissolution of the WHA. They quickly found success, first by shocking the Montreal Canadiens in 1980–81, then by finishing atop the Smythe Division each of the next five years. After falling to the New York Islanders in their first Stanley Cup Final in 1982–83, the Oilers achieved what is generally regarded as the last dynasty in NHL history by capturing five Stanley Cups in seven years between 1984 and 1990.

The Oilers were not able to duplicate that level of success, before capturing their seventh Conference title in 2005–06. Their run took them to the seventh game of the Stanley Cup Final, which they lost to the Carolina Hurricanes. Afterwards, the Oilers endured a decade long playoff drought in which the Oilers made 16 first round selections between 2007 to 2019 in which four were first overall picks; they used those picks to select Taylor Hall, Ryan Nugent-Hopkins, Nail Yakupov and Connor McDavid.

The Oilers achieved a new era of success with McDavid and Leon Draisaitl. After ending their decade-long playoff drought in 2016–17, the Oilers have qualified for the playoffs in every season since 2019–20 and appeared in the Stanley Cup Finals in consecutive years in 2024 and 2025, losing on both occasions against the Florida Panthers.

== WHA (1972–1979) ==
Avco World Trophy champions	Division or regular season champions	League leader

Note: GP = Games played, W = Wins, L = Losses, T = Ties, Pts = Points, GF = Goals for, GA = Goals against, PIM = Penalties in minutes

Season	Team	GP	W	L	T	Pts	GF	GA	PIM	Finish	Playoffs	Reference
1972–73	1972–73	78	38	37	3	79	269	256	1134	4th, West	Did not qualify	
1973–74	1973–74	78	38	37	3	79	268	269	1273	3rd, West	Lost in quarterfinals, 1–4 (Fighting Saints)	
1974–75	1974–75	78	36	38	4	76	279	279	896	5th, Canadian	Did not qualify	
1975–76	1975–76	81	27	49	5	59	268	345	991	4th, Canadian	Lost in quarterfinals, 0–4 (Jets)	
1976–77	1976–77	81	34	43	4	72	243	304	1319	4th, West	Lost in quarterfinals, 1–4 (Aeros)	
1977–78	1977–78	80	38	39	3	79	309	307	1296	5th, WHA	Lost in quarterfinals, 1–4 (Whalers)	
1978–79	1978–79	80	48	30	2	98	340	266	1220	1st, WHA	Won in semifinals, 4–3 (Whalers); Lost in Avco Cup Finals, 2–4 (Jets)	
Totals		556	264	266	26	554	2,030	2,026	7,838		5 playoff appearances	

== NHL (1979–present) ==
=== Table key ===
Key of colors and symbols
Color/symbol	Explanation
†	Stanley Cup champions
‡	Conference champions
↑	Division champions
#	Led league in points

Key of terms and abbreviations
Term or abbreviation	Definition
Finish	Final position in division or league standings
GP	Number of games played
W	Number of wins
L	Number of losses
T	Number of ties
OT	Number of losses in overtime (since the 1999–2000 season)
Pts	Number of points
GF	Goals for (goals scored by the Oilers)
GA	Goals against (goals scored by the Oilers' opponents)
—	Does not apply

=== Year by year ===
Season	Oilers season	Conference	Division	Regular season									Postseason					
Season	Oilers season	Conference	Division	Finish	GP	W	L	T	OT	Pts	GF	GA	GP	W	L	GF	GA	Result
1979–80	1979–80	Campbell	Smythe	4th	80	28	39	13	—	69	301	322	3	0	3	6	12	Lost in preliminary round, 0–3 (Flyers)
1980–81	1980–81	Campbell	Smythe	4th	80	29	35	16	—	74	328	327	9	5	4	35	35	Won in preliminary round, 3–0 (Canadiens); Lost in quarterfinals, 2–4 (Islanders)
1981–82	1981–82	Campbell	Smythe↑	1st	80	48	17	15	—	111	417	295	5	2	3	23	27	Lost in division semifinals, 2–3 (Kings)
1982–83	1982–83	Campbell‡	Smythe↑	1st	80	47	21	12	—	106	424	315	16	11	5	80	50	Won in division semifinals, 3–0 (Jets); Won in division finals, 4–1 (Flames); Won in conference finals, 4–0 (Black Hawks); Lost in Stanley Cup Final, 0–4 (Islanders)
1983–84	1983–84	Campbell‡	Smythe↑	1st	80	57	18	5	—	119#	446	314	19	15	4	94	56	Won in division semifinals, 3–0 (Jets); Won in division finals, 4–3 (Flames); Won in conference finals, 4–0 (North Stars); Won in Stanley Cup Final, 4–1 (Islanders)†
1984–85	1984–85	Campbell‡	Smythe↑	1st	80	49	20	11	—	109	401	298	18	15	3	98	57	Won in division semifinals, 3–0 (Kings); Won in division finals, 4–0 (Jets); Won in conference finals, 4–2 (Black Hawks); Won in Stanley Cup Final, 4–1 (Flyers)†
1985–86	1985–86	Campbell	Smythe↑	1st	80	56	17	7	—	119#	426	310	10	6	4	41	30	Won in division semifinals, 3–0 (Canucks); Lost in division finals, 3–4 (Flames)
1986–87	1986–87	Campbell‡	Smythe↑	1st	80	50	24	6	—	106#	372	284	21	16	5	87	57	Won in division semifinals, 4–1 (Kings); Won in division finals, 4–0 (Jets); Won in conference finals, 4–1 (Red Wings); Won in Stanley Cup Final, 4–3 (Flyers)†
1987–88	1987–88	Campbell‡	Smythe	2nd	80	44	25	11	—	99	363	288	18	16	2	84	53	Won in division semifinals, 4–1 (Jets); Won in division finals, 4–0 (Flames); Won in conference finals, 4–1 (Red Wings); Won in Stanley Cup Final, 4–0 (Bruins)†
1988–89	1988–89	Campbell	Smythe	3rd	80	38	34	8	—	84	325	306	7	3	4	20	25	Lost in division semifinals, 3–4 (Kings)
1989–90	1989–90	Campbell‡	Smythe	2nd	80	38	28	14	—	90	315	283	22	16	6	93	60	Won in division semifinals, 4–3 (Jets); Won in division finals, 4–0 (Kings); Won in conference finals, 4–2 (Blackhawks); Won in Stanley Cup Final, 4–1 (Bruins)†
1990–91	1990–91	Campbell	Smythe	3rd	80	37	37	6	—	80	272	272	18	9	9	57	60	Won in division semifinals, 4–3 (Flames); Won in division finals, 4–2 (Kings); Lost in conference finals, 1–4 (North Stars)
1991–92	1991–92	Campbell	Smythe	3rd	80	36	34	10	—	82	295	297	16	8	8	49	54	Won in division semifinals, 4–2 (Kings); Won in division finals, 4–2 (Canucks); Lost in conference finals, 0–4 (Blackhawks)
1992–93	1992–93	Campbell	Smythe	5th	84	26	50	8	—	60	242	337	—	—	—	—	—	Did not qualify
1993–94	1993–94	Western	Pacific	6th	84	25	45	14	—	64	261	305	—	—	—	—	—	Did not qualify
1994–95^{1}	1994–95	Western	Pacific	5th	48	17	27	4	—	38	136	183	—	—	—	—	—	Did not qualify
1995–96	1995–96	Western	Pacific	5th	82	30	44	8	—	68	240	304	—	—	—	—	—	Did not qualify
1996–97	1996–97	Western	Pacific	3rd	82	36	37	9	—	81	252	247	12	5	7	32	37	Won in conference quarterfinals, 4–3 (Stars); Lost in conference semifinals, 1–4 (Avalanche)
1997–98	1997–98	Western	Pacific	3rd	82	35	37	10	—	80	215	224	12	5	7	24	25	Won in conference quarterfinals, 4–3 (Avalanche); Lost in conference semifinals, 1–4 (Stars)
1998–99	1998–99	Western	Northwest	2nd	82	33	37	12	—	78	230	226	4	0	4	7	11	Lost in conference quarterfinals, 0–4 (Stars)
1999–2000	1999–2000	Western	Northwest	2nd	82	32	26	16	8	88	226	212	5	1	4	11	14	Lost in conference quarterfinals, 1–4 (Stars)
2000–01	2000–01	Western	Northwest	2nd	82	39	28	12	3	93	243	222	6	2	4	13	16	Lost in conference quarterfinals, 2–4 (Stars)
2001–02	2001–02	Western	Northwest	3rd	82	38	28	12	4	92	205	182	—	—	—	—	—	Did not qualify
2002–03	2002–03	Western	Northwest	4th	82	36	26	11	9	92	231	230	6	2	4	11	20	Lost in conference quarterfinals, 2–4 (Stars)
2003–04	2003–04	Western	Northwest	4th	82	36	29	12	5	89	221	208	—	—	—	—	—	Did not qualify
2004–05^{2}	2004–05	Season cancelled due to 2004–05 NHL lockout																
2005–06^{3}	2005–06	Western‡	Northwest	3rd	82	41	28	—	13	95	249	242	24	15	9	70	61	Won in conference quarterfinals, 4–2 (Red Wings); Won in conference semifinals, 4–2 (Sharks); Won in conference finals, 4–1 (Mighty Ducks); Lost in Stanley Cup Final, 3–4 (Hurricanes)
2006–07	2006–07	Western	Northwest	5th	82	32	43	—	7	71	192	245	—	—	—	—	—	Did not qualify
2007–08	2007–08	Western	Northwest	4th	82	41	35	—	6	88	220	247	—	—	—	—	—	Did not qualify
2008–09	2008–09	Western	Northwest	4th	82	38	35	—	9	85	228	244	—	—	—	—	—	Did not qualify
2009–10	2009–10	Western	Northwest	5th	82	27	47	—	8	62	206	278	—	—	—	—	—	Did not qualify
2010–11	2010–11	Western	Northwest	5th	82	25	45	—	12	62	191	260	—	—	—	—	—	Did not qualify
2011–12	2011–12	Western	Northwest	5th	82	32	40	—	10	74	207	232	—	—	—	—	—	Did not qualify
2012–13^{4}	2012–13	Western	Northwest	3rd	48	19	22	—	7	45	123	131	—	—	—	—	—	Did not qualify
2013–14	2013–14	Western	Pacific	7th	82	29	44	—	9	67	199	267	—	—	—	—	—	Did not qualify
2014–15	2014–15	Western	Pacific	6th	82	24	44	—	14	62	193	276	—	—	—	—	—	Did not qualify
2015–16	2015–16	Western	Pacific	7th	82	31	43	—	8	70	199	242	—	—	—	—	—	Did not qualify
2016–17	2016–17	Western	Pacific	2nd	82	47	26	—	9	103	243	207	13	7	6	36	35	Won in first round, 4–2 (Sharks); Lost in second round, 3–4 (Ducks)
2017–18	2017–18	Western	Pacific	6th	82	36	40	—	6	78	229	262	—	—	—	—	—	Did not qualify
2018–19	2018–19	Western	Pacific	7th	82	35	38	—	9	79	229	271	—	—	—	—	—	Did not qualify
2019–20^{5}	2019–20	Western	Pacific	2nd	71	37	25	—	9	83	223	215	4	1	3	15	16	Lost in qualifying round, 1–3 (Blackhawks)
2020–21^{6}	2020–21	—	North	2nd	56	35	19	—	2	72	183	154	4	0	4	8	14	Lost in first round, 0–4 (Jets)
2021–22	2021–22	Western	Pacific	2nd	82	49	27	—	6	104	285	251	16	8	8	65	59	Won in first round, 4–3 (Kings); Won in second round, 4–1 (Flames); Lost in conference finals, 0–4 (Avalanche)
2022–23	2022–23	Western	Pacific	2nd	82	50	23	—	9	109	325	256	12	6	6	44	42	Won in first round, 4–2 (Kings); Lost in second round, 2–4 (Golden Knights)
2023–24	2023–24	Western‡	Pacific	2nd	82	49	27	—	6	104	292	236	25	15	10	86	65	Won in first round, 4–1 (Kings); Won in second round, 4–3 (Canucks); Won in conference finals, 4–2 (Stars); Lost in Stanley Cup Final, 3–4 (Panthers)
2024–25	2024–25	Western‡	Pacific	3rd	82	48	29	—	5	101	259	235	22	14	8	82	73	Won in first round, 4–2 (Kings); Won in second round, 4–1 (Golden Knights); Won in conference finals, 4–1 (Stars); Lost in Stanley Cup Final, 2–4 (Panthers)
2025–26	2025–26	Western	Pacific	2nd	82	41	30	—	11	93	282	265	6	2	4	21	26	Lost in first round, 2–4 (Ducks)
Totals					3,645	1,706	1,473	262	204	3,878	12,226	11,887	353	205	148	1,292	1,090	28 playoff appearances

^{1} Season was shortened due to the 1994–95 NHL lockout.
^{2} Season was cancelled due to the 2004–05 NHL lockout.
^{3} As of the 2005–06 NHL season, all games tied after overtime will be decided in a shootout; SOL (Shootout losses) will be recorded as OTL in the standings.
^{4} Season was shortened due to the 2012–13 NHL lockout.
^{5} Season was suspended on March 12, 2020 due to the COVID-19 pandemic.
^{6} Season was shortened due to the COVID-19 pandemic.

==== All-time NHL records ====
Statistic	GP	W	L	T	OT
Regular season record (1979–present)	3,645	1,706	1,473	262	204
Postseason record (1979–present)	353	205	148	—	—
All-time regular and postseason record	3,998	1,868	1,621	262	204
All-time series record: 44–23
