= Oil Change (TV series) =

- Written by: Scot Morison
- Starring: (Season 1) Edmonton Oilers 2010-2011 (Season 2) Edmonton Oilers 2011-2012 (Season 3) Edmonton Oilers 2012-2013 (Season 4) Edmonton Oilers 2013-2014
- Narrated by: Gord Marriott
- Country of origin: Canada
- Original language: English
- No. of seasons: 4
- No. of episodes: 24

Production
- Executive producer: Don Metz
- Producers: Gord Redel, Scot Morison
- Production locations: Edmonton, Alberta, Canada
- Editors: Wes Belair, Paul Smart
- Running time: 43 minutes
- Production company: Aquila Productions

Original release
- Network: TSN (Season 1); City Edmonton (Season 2); Sportsnet (Season 2−4)
- Release: October 20, 2010 – April 20, 2014

Oil Change was a Canadian documentary television series, following the Edmonton Oilers. Produced by Alberta's Aquila Productions and written by Scot Morison, Oil Change featured exclusive access inside the Edmonton Oilers organization through the 2010–11 NHL season (season 1) to the 2013–14 NHL season (season 4). Don Metz was the executive producer of the series, Gord Redel was the producer, and Scot Morison was the writer/story developer.

The first season aired on TSN. Season 2 premiered locally on City owned-and-operated station CKEM-DT in Edmonton, Alberta on October 21, 2011, and nationally on Sportsnet on October 23, 2011. Each season aired approximately once a month, until the end of the NHL regular season.

Aquila Productions announced on October 20, 2014, the series would not return for a fifth season.

== Episodes ==
=== Pilot (2010) ===
Title	Original release date
"Pilot"	June 24, 2010
Four years after reaching the Stanley Cup Finals, the Oilers are coming off yet another losing season. Good news is they have won the #1 overall pick in the upcoming draft. Bad news is they have to wade through dozens of dynamic prospects to find the right player to build the team around.

=== Season 1 (2010–2011) ===
No. overall	No. in season	Title	Original release date
1	1	"Changes"	October 20, 2010
In episode one, "Changes", we join Oilers' scouts and management in Los Angeles for the 2010 NHL Entry Draft on June 25th. The documentary takes viewers deep inside the Oilers organization as the team's amateur scouts, along with General Manager Steve Tambellini and President of Hockey Operations Kevin Lowe, make their final deliberations on the first overall pick in the draft. With eventual pick Taylor Hall and other carefully chosen players from later rounds of the draft now theirs, the Oilers return to Edmonton. There they launch the bold, wholesale rebuild promised by Tambellini and Lowe, with the full backing of billionaire owner Daryl Katz, in the Oil Change pilot that aired on TSN on June 24th, the night before the draft.
2	2	"Overdrive"	November 23, 2011
Episode two of Oil Change picks up the Oilers on the first big road trip of the year.
3	3	"The Team"	January 4, 2011
As the NHL season chugs towards Christmas, the Oilers continue to provide fans with an emotional roller-coaster ride. This is a team that wins unlikely games and loses others that should be an automatic two points. Through it all, head coach Renney and his assistants remain patient and stick to their game plan, sometimes reinforcing their lessons with a soft touch and other times with toughness. The players take a memorable road trip to Anaheim and Phoenix with their fathers, sharing a round of golf in the desert between games. Back in Edmonton and preparing for a tilt against the Sharks, they get a surprise dressing room visit and pep talk from Prime Minister Harper, in town for the 2010 Grey Cup. Heading east, they sweep the Sen, Habs and Leafs, only to come back to Edmonton and play inconsistent hockey during a lengthy, pre-Christmas home stand. With the New Year looming, injured captain Shawn Horcoff assesses the progress of Oil Change on the eve of another Battle of Alberta against the Flames.
4	4	"The Grind"	February 13, 2011
January finds the Oilers’ playoff chances in growing jeopardy. Some fans advocate throwing in the towel right now, arguing that a freefall in the standings will secure them another valuable first or second overall draft pick in June. But the coaches and players are proud professionals and refuse to give up. As the team grinds their way through a long prairie winter, the true character of the squad reveals itself. The rookies gain valuable seasoning; the vets show their leadership qualities. Some players fulfill expectations, while others slip back on the depth chart as the team moves forward. Meanwhile, Oiler brass and scouts are busy looking at the progress of their AHL farm hands down in Oklahoma City, at possible draft picks in June, and at previous draft picks back playing in the juniors. This will be a very intense time for the new Oilers. If the team does well over the next month and a half and exceeds expectations, it could be back in playoff contention when the February 28th trade deadline approaches.
5	5	"Deadline"	March 21, 2011
By the time this episode airs, a little over two weeks after the NHL trade deadline, the Oilers will have declared their intentions for the rest of the season. They will either stand pat with the team they have, bolstered as needed by call-ups from the AHL, or they will have moved players, and possibly very important players, either in preparation for a serious push for the playoffs in the spring or to make roster space for the next stage of their ongoing rebuild.
6	6	"End of the Beginning"	April 20, 2011
One of two scenarios will play itself out in the final episode of Oil Change. The team will either be in the hunt, with everyone’s focus firmly fixed on the prize – making the playoffs – or the Oilers will know they are once again destined to finish the season on the outside looking in. In that case, management and coaches will be looking to make some tough calls over the final weeks on the futures of their players. For non-playoff teams, this is the time when players, and particularly those on the bubble, must take advantage of the remaining games on the schedule to make their case for a new contract. In both scenarios, the future remains to be written.

=== Season 2 (2011–2012) ===
Also known as Oil Change: Overdrive.

No. overall	No. in season	Title	Original release date
7	1	"Episode 1"	October 21, 2011
The first episode of Oil Change looks at the Edmonton Oilers as they make their move from the bottom of the league by selecting the 1st overall draft pick in Minnesota. We go inside the boardroom with the management team as they sign new free agents . Then we go to training Camp to see who will crack the regular season roster. The episode ends with the season opener against Pittsburgh.
8	2	"Episode 2"	November 25, 2011
Episode two of Oil Change picks up the Oilers on the first big road trip of the year. They will barely be a dozen games into the season then, too soon to know how good (or bad) they might be, but this first long road trip of the year could deliver a critical bonding experience for an emerging young team.Will this be the trip that bonds this band of brothers? Only time will tell.
9	3	"Episode 3"	December 30, 2012
Although the Oilers’ game to game play and win–loss record remain paramount, this episode gives us a chance to get to know some of the players a little bit better away from the rink – perhaps decorating a Christmas tree, shopping for their kids or making community appearances.
10	4	"Episode 4"	February 10, 2012
The fourth episode of Oil Change is about a long, cold winter’s stretch of tough games. There is a very good chance that those games after Christmas through January will make or break the Oilers’ chances of getting into the playoffs. They will also certainly help inform management’s decisions about what to do, or not do, with the NHL’s trade deadline fast approaching
11	5	"Episode 5"	March 16, 2012
Oil Change is right there with Tambellini and his management team as the deals go down in the Oilers war room with cameras rolling when intense, last-minute negotiations between Tambellini and the brass of other teams go down. We'll also follow the fall out of those trades on the team.
12	6	"Episode 6"	April 20, 2012
The final episode of Oil Change follows the Edmonton Oilers through the last month of the 2011-12 NHL season. The young Oilers know they will not make the playoffs, but with head coach Tom Renney cracking the whip they’re determined to finish strong, earn respect around the league for their talent and work ethic, and lay important groundwork on the road to becoming a playoff team next season.

=== Season 3 (2013) ===
Also known as Oil Change: Game On.

No. overall	No. in season	Title	Original release date
13	1	"Episode 1"	January 29, 2013
Season 3 opens with a look at the 2012 NHL Draft and the Oilers' first-overall selection of Nail Yakupov. Also featured: the team's lockout-shortened training camp under new coach Ralph Krueger; and the season opener on the road against Vancouver.
14	2	"Episode 2"	February 24, 2013
The team looks to regroup following its 6-3 home-opening loss to San Jose.
15	3	"Episode 3"	March 24, 2013
The team's franchise-record nine-game road trip is highlighted
16	4	"Episode 4"	April 14, 2013
The team wraps up its nine-game road trip, and continues its quest for a spot in the playoff race.
17	5	"Episode 5"	May 5, 2013
The disappointing final weeks of the team's season are chronicled in the third-season finale.

=== Season 4 (2013–2014) ===
Also known as Oil Change: All In.

No. overall	No. in season	Title	Original release date
18	1	"Episode 1"	October 20, 2013
19	2	"Episode 2"	November 17, 2013
20	3	"Episode 3"	December 22, 2013
21	4	"Episode 4"	January 26, 2014
22	5	"Episode 5"	March 2, 2014
23	6	"Episode 6"	April 20, 2014

== International airings ==
NHL Network re-airs the series in the United States.
