= Dan Smith (ice hockey) =

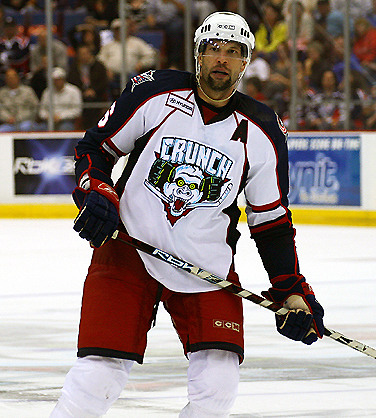
- Smith with the Syracuse Crunch in 2007
- Born: October 19, 1976 (age 49) Fernie, British Columbia, Canada
- Height: 6 ft 3 in (191 cm)
- Weight: 215 lb (98 kg; 15 st 5 lb)
- Position: Defence
- Shot: Left
- Played for: Colorado Avalanche; Edmonton Oilers; Lukko
- NHL draft: 181st overall, 1995; Colorado Avalanche
- Playing career: 1997–2009

Dan Smith (born October 19, 1976) is a Canadian former professional ice hockey defenceman who played primarily in the American Hockey League (AHL), he also played 22 games in the National Hockey League with the Colorado Avalanche and the Edmonton Oilers between 1998 and 2005.

== Playing career ==
Smith was selected 181st overall in the 1995 NHL entry draft, by the Colorado Avalanche. After completing his junior career with the Tri-City Americans of the WHL, Smith made his professional debut with the Hershey Bears, Colorado's AHL farm team. During his five years with the Colorado, Smith played only 15 games for Avalanche, with the bulk of his time being spent with the Bears.

After a year playing in Finland, and another year in the Phoenix Coyotes organization (playing for the AHL Springfield Falcons), Smith signed with the Edmonton Oilers on August 21, 2003.

In the three years Smith was part of the Oilers organization, he played nearly all the time with Edmonton's respective AHL affiliate. He collected another seven games during the 2005–06 season with the big club.

On July 13, 2006, Smith was signed by the Detroit Red Wings. After the Red Wings training camp, Smith was assigned to Detroit's AHL affiliate, the Grand Rapids Griffins, with whom he played the 2006–07 season.

For the 2007–08 season, on July 11, 2007, Smith was signed by the Columbus Blue Jackets. Added as depth for their affiliate, the Syracuse Crunch, Smith's veteran presence helped guide the Crunch to the second round of the playoffs. Smith re-signed on July 8, 2008, with the Crunch for the following 2008–09 season. Named captain, the tenth in Syracuse history, Smith missed only one game in the year as the Crunch failed to qualify for the playoffs.

Smith retired on December 10, 2009.

== Career statistics ==
			Regular season					Playoffs
Season	Team	League	GP	G	A	Pts	PIM	GP	G	A	Pts	PIM
1993–94	Fernie Ghostriders	RMJHL	—	—	—	—	—	—	—	—	—	—
1994–95	University of British Columbia	CWUAA	28	1	2	3	26	—	—	—	—	—
1995–96	Tri–City Americans	WHL	58	1	21	22	70	11	1	3	4	14
1996–97	Tri–City Americans	WHL	72	5	19	24	174	—	—	—	—	—
1996–97	Hershey Bears	AHL	8	0	1	1	6	15	0	1	1	25
1997–98	Hershey Bears	AHL	50	1	2	3	71	6	0	0	0	4
1998–99	Hershey Bears	AHL	54	5	7	12	72	5	0	1	1	0
1998–99	Colorado Avalanche	NHL	12	0	0	0	9	—	—	—	—	—
1999–2000	Hershey Bears	AHL	49	7	15	22	56	—	—	—	—	—
1999–2000	Colorado Avalanche	NHL	3	0	0	0	0	—	—	—	—	—
2000–01	Hershey Bears	AHL	58	2	12	14	34	12	0	1	1	4
2001–02	Lukko	SM-l	32	1	2	3	18	—	—	—	—	—
2001–02	Colorado Gold Kings	WCHL	12	0	2	2	16	—	—	—	—	—
2002–03	Springfield Falcons	AHL	69	1	14	15	53	6	0	2	2	0
2003–04	Toronto Roadrunners	AHL	66	4	9	13	41	—	—	—	—	—
2004–05	Edmonton Road Runners	AHL	72	5	10	15	72	—	—	—	—	—
2005–06	Hamilton Bulldogs	AHL	69	0	16	16	61	—	—	—	—	—
2005–06	Edmonton Oilers	NHL	7	0	0	0	7	—	—	—	—	—
2006–07	Grand Rapids Griffins	AHL	80	1	10	11	97	7	0	1	1	8
2007–08	Syracuse Crunch	AHL	77	1	6	7	73	10	0	1	1	17
2008–09	Syracuse Crunch	AHL	79	3	4	7	91	—	—	—	—	—
AHL totals			731	30	106	136	727	61	0	7	7	58
NHL totals			22	0	0	0	16	—	—	—	—	—

== Transactions ==
- July 8, 1995 – Smith drafted by Colorado Avalanche
- August 8, 2002 – Smith signs with Phoenix Coyotes
- August 21, 2003 – Smith signs with Edmonton Oilers
- July 13, 2006 – Smith signs with Detroit Red Wings
- July 11, 2007 – Smith signs with Columbus Blue Jackets
