= Jean-François Jacques =

Canadian ice hockey player

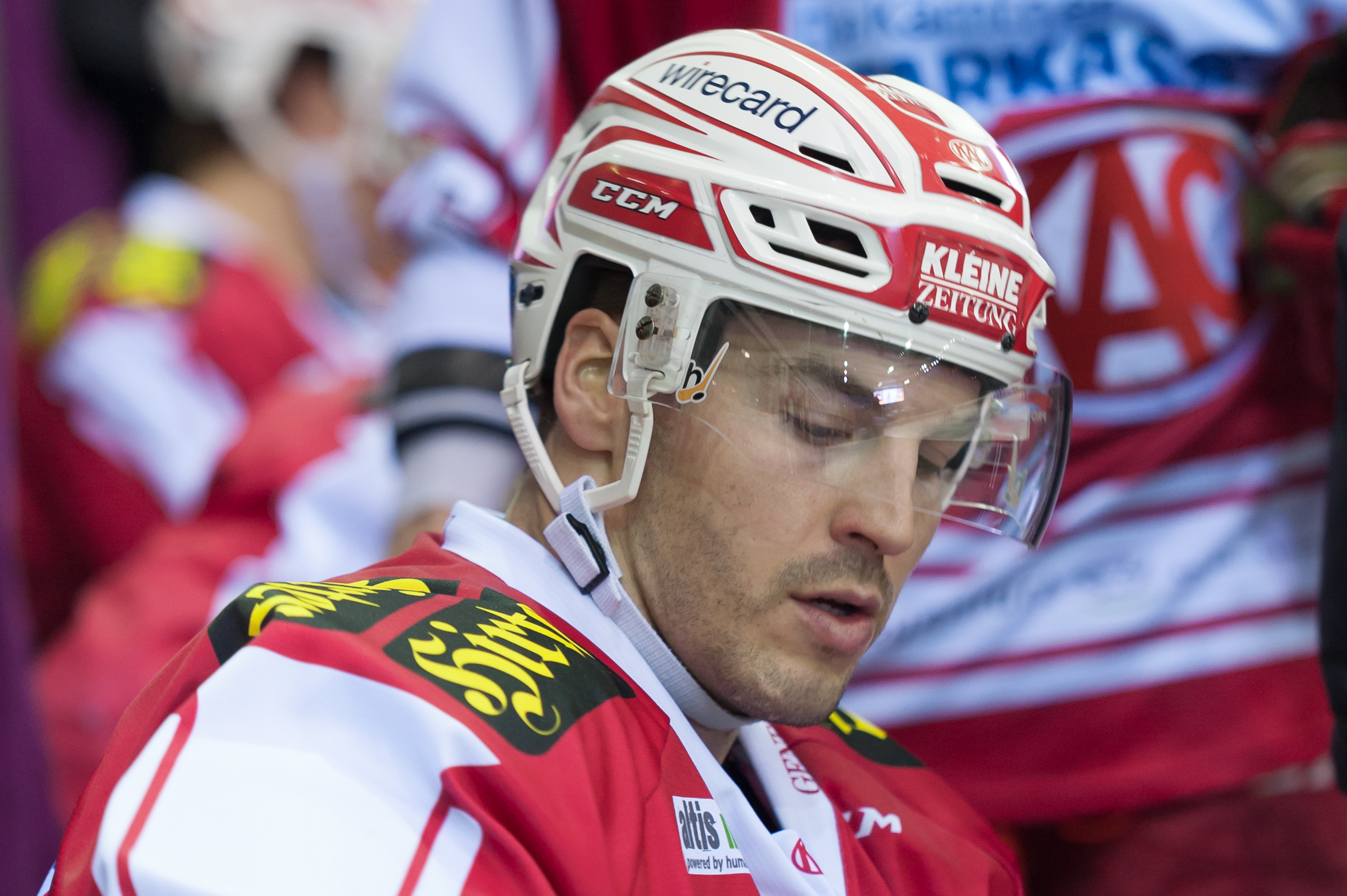
- Born: April 29, 1985 (age 41) Terrebonne, Quebec, Canada
- Height: 6 ft 3 in (191 cm)
- Weight: 231 lb (105 kg; 16 st 7 lb)
- Position: Left wing
- Shot: Left
- Played for: Edmonton Oilers; Anaheim Ducks; EC KAC; ERC Ingolstadt
- NHL draft: 68th overall, 2003; Edmonton Oilers
- Playing career: 2005–2018

Jean-François "J. F." Jacques (born April 29, 1985) is a Canadian former professional ice hockey left winger. He was selected by the Edmonton Oilers in the second round (68th overall) of the 2003 NHL entry draft.

== Playing career ==
As a youth, Jacques played in the 1999 Quebec International Pee-Wee Hockey Tournament with a minor ice hockey team from Lanaudière.

Jacques played for four seasons with the Baie-Comeau Drakkar of the Quebec Major Junior Hockey League (QMJHL). At the 2003 NHL entry draft, the Edmonton Oilers traded first round picks with the New Jersey Devils, giving up their 17th overall position to the Devils (who then drafted Zach Parise) in exchange for the 22nd overall pick (Oilers drafted Marc-Antoine Pouliot) and the 68th overall pick which was used by the Oilers to select Jacques. He made his professional debut with the Edmonton Road Runners of the American Hockey League (AHL) in 2004–05, appearing in six games as a late-season call-up.

Following Oilers training camp for the 2005–06 season, Jacques was assigned to the Hamilton Bulldogs of the AHL. where he played the first half of the season. He was recalled to the Oilers to replace injured forward Ethan Moreau, making his NHL debut on February 2, 2006 against the Columbus Blue Jackets.

Jacques broke through and began the 2009–10 season with a regular spot on the Oilers' checking line. On November 3, 2010, the Oilers assigned him to their AHL affiliate, the Oklahoma City Barons for conditioning.

On September 24, 2011, Jacques was suspended for the remainder of the pre-season and the first five games of the regular season due to leaving the bench to initiate a fight with Mike Duco of the Vancouver Canucks.

On July 5, 2012, Jacques signed a one-year, two-way deal with the Florida Panthers. He was directly assigned to start the 2012–13 season with affiliate, the San Antonio Rampage, due to the 2012 NHL lockout. Failing to establish a defined role with the Rampage, Jacques was traded by the Panthers to the Tampa Bay Lightning for future considerations on January 21, 2013.

On August 16, 2013, Jacques signed a PTO with the Springfield Falcons of the American Hockey League.

On June 23, 2014, the Klagenfurter AC of the Austrian Hockey League signed Jacques as a free agent on a two-year deal, beginning in the 2014–15 season.

At the conclusion of his contract with KAC, Jacques left as a free agent to sign in the neighbouring German league, agreeing to a one-year deal with ERC Ingolstadt of the Deutsche Eishockey Liga on August 22, 2016. In the 2016–17 campaign, Jacques was unable to translate his scoring rate from the EBEL, posting 9 goals and 16 points in 52 games before suffering a preliminary playoff loss to the Fischtown Pinguins to conclude his tenure with ERC.

== Career statistics ==
=== Regular season and playoffs ===
			Regular season					Playoffs
Season	Team	League	GP	G	A	Pts	PIM	GP	G	A	Pts	PIM
2000–01	Cap–de–la–Madelaine Estacades	QMAAA	39	22	13	35	28	10	5	8	13	14
2001–02	Baie–Comeau Drakkar	QMJHL	66	10	14	24	136	5	1	0	1	2
2002–03	Baie–Comeau Drakkar	QMJHL	66	12	21	33	123	12	4	2	6	13
2003–04	Baie–Comeau Drakkar	QMJHL	59	20	24	44	70	4	1	0	1	4
2004–05	Baie–Comeau Drakkar	QMJHL	69	36	42	78	56	6	3	5	8	6
2004–05	Edmonton Road Runners	AHL	6	0	0	0	5	—	—	—	—	—
2005–06	Edmonton Oilers	NHL	7	0	0	0	0	—	—	—	—	—
2005–06	Hamilton Bulldogs	AHL	65	24	20	44	131	—	—	—	—	—
2006–07	Edmonton Oilers	NHL	37	0	0	0	33	—	—	—	—	—
2006–07	Wilkes–Barre/Scranton Penguins	AHL	29	10	17	27	53	11	1	2	3	43
2007–08	Edmonton Oilers	NHL	9	0	0	0	2	—	—	—	—	—
2007–08	Springfield Falcons	AHL	38	11	14	25	63	—	—	—	—	—
2008–09	Edmonton Oilers	NHL	7	1	0	1	9	—	—	—	—	—
2008–09	Springfield Falcons	AHL	8	1	5	6	13	—	—	—	—	—
2009–10	Edmonton Oilers	NHL	49	4	7	11	78	—	—	—	—	—
2010–11	Edmonton Oilers	NHL	51	4	1	5	63	—	—	—	—	—
2010–11	Oklahoma City Barons	AHL	4	1	0	1	15	—	—	—	—	—
2011–12	Anaheim Ducks	NHL	6	0	0	0	12	—	—	—	—	—
2011–12	Syracuse Crunch	AHL	65	21	19	40	95	4	0	0	0	2
2012–13	San Antonio Rampage	AHL	24	5	2	7	37	—	—	—	—	—
2012–13	Syracuse Crunch	AHL	24	1	4	5	24	—	—	—	—	—
2013–14	Springfield Falcons	AHL	52	15	17	32	20	5	1	0	1	8
2014–15	EC KAC	AUT	53	17	16	33	24	9	3	5	8	38
2015–16	EC KAC	AUT	42	18	19	37	36	7	0	2	2	2
2016–17	ERC Ingolstadt	DEL	52	9	7	16	24	2	0	0	0	48
2017–18	Sorel–Tracy Éperviers	LNAH	4	2	4	6	0	—	—	—	—	—
2017–18	HC Pustertal Wölfe	AlpsHL	7	2	7	8	0	8	2	1	3	4
2017–18	HC Pustertal Wölfe	ITA	2	0	0	0	4	—	—	—	—	—
AHL totals			315	89	98	187	456	20	2	2	4	53
NHL totals			166	9	8	17	197	—	—	—	—	—

=== International ===
Year	Team	Event	GP	G	A	Pts	PIM
2002	Canada Quebec	U17
2002	Canada	U18	5	1	0	1	4
Junior totals			5	1	0	1	4
