= Aleš Hemský =

Czech ice hockey player (born 1983)

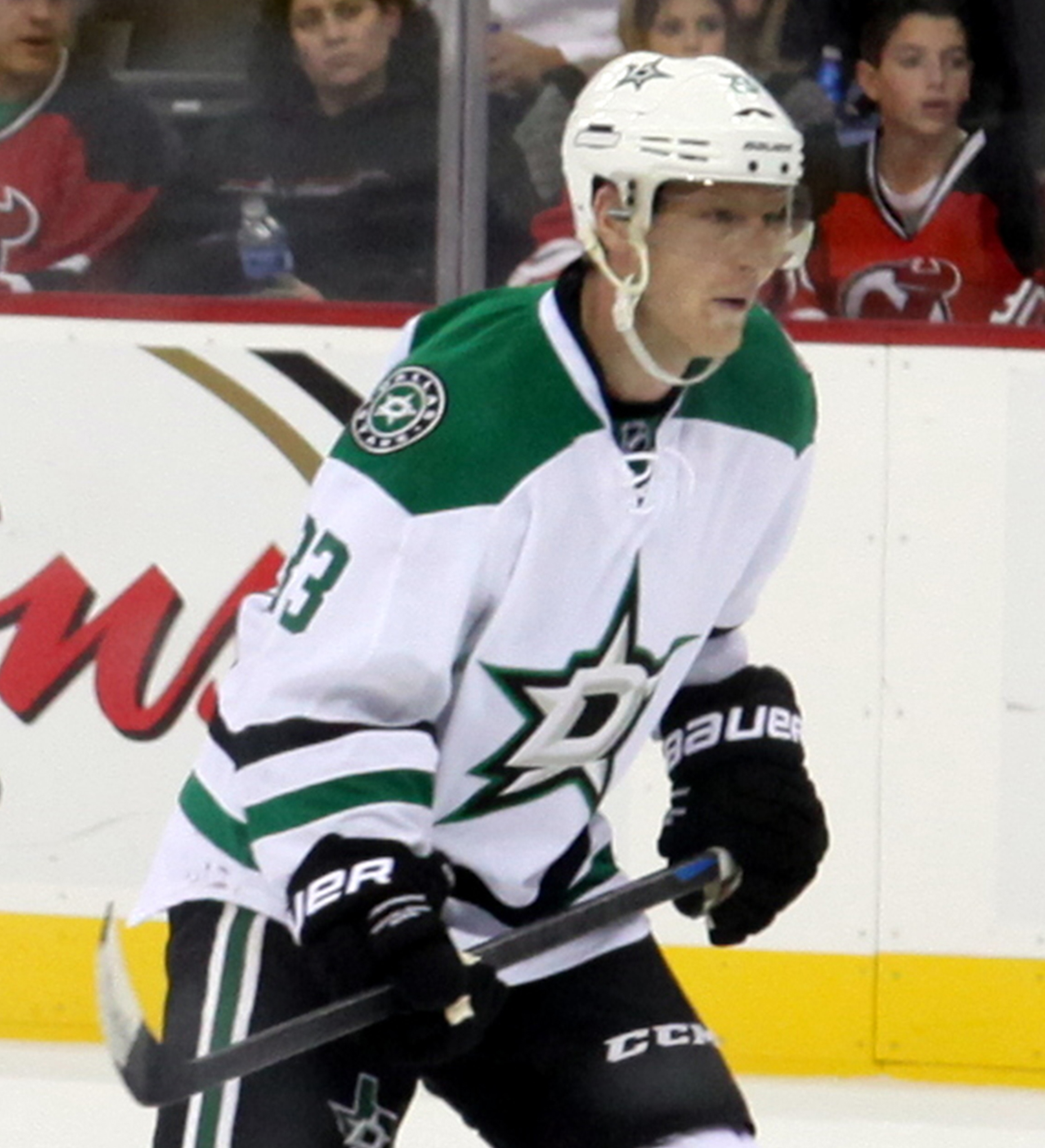
- Hemský with the Dallas Stars in 2014
- Born: 13 August 1983 (age 43) Pardubice, Czechoslovakia
- Height: 6 ft 0 in (183 cm)
- Weight: 185 lb (84 kg; 13 st 3 lb)
- Position: Right wing
- Shot: Right
- Played for: HC Pardubice; Edmonton Oilers; Ottawa Senators; Dallas Stars; Montreal Canadiens
- National team: Czech Republic
- NHL draft: 13th overall, 2001; Edmonton Oilers
- Playing career: 2002–2018

Aleš Hemský (Czech pronunciation: [ˈalɛʃ ˈɦɛmskiː], born 13 August 1983) is a Czech former professional ice hockey player. He was selected 13th overall by the Edmonton Oilers in the 2001 NHL entry draft. In the National Hockey League (NHL) he played for the Edmonton Oilers, Ottawa Senators, Dallas Stars and Montreal Canadiens. He represented the Czech Republic at two Winter Olympics.

== Playing career ==
=== HC Pardubice ===
Hemský entered professional ice hockey as a 16-year-old, playing for HC Moeller Pardubice of the Czech Extraliga, in his hometown of Pardubice. He split the 1999–2000 season between Moeller and their junior club, HC Moeller Pardubice Jr. Hemský decided he had a better chance to be scouted if he played in the Canadian junior leagues than if he tried to make the jump to the Czech Extraliga, and he subsequently became the first selection of the Hull Olympiques in the 2000 Canadian Hockey League (CHL) Import Draft.

=== Hull Olympiques ===
In 2000, Hemský moved to North America to play for the Hull Olympiques (now known as the Gatineau Olympiques) of the Quebec Major Junior Hockey League (QMJHL). The following season, 2000–01, Hemský led all rookies in scoring with 36 goals and 100 points. He was named to the All-Rookie team, was selected to play in the 2001 CHL Top Prospects Game, and was awarded the Mike Bossy Trophy as the QMJHL's top pro prospect.

Hemský continued his success in Hull during the 2001–02 season, with 27 goals and 97 points in 53 games, and finished 19th in the QMJHL scoring race.

=== Edmonton Oilers ===
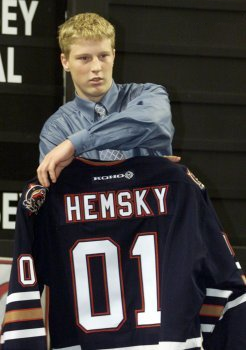
Hemský on the stage at the 2001 NHL entry draft, after the Oilers selected him 13th overall.

On 12 October 2002, Hemský recorded his first NHL point against the Nashville Predators. On 4 January 2003, Hemský scored his first career goal against the Montreal Canadiens, in the 26th game of his rookie season. During his rookie season, he scored six goals and 30 points in 59 games.. He went pointless in all six of Edmonton's playoff games.

Hemský returned to the Czech Republic to play 47 games for HC Moeller Pardubice during the 2004–05 NHL lockout. During that time, he scored 13 goals and 31 points, fifth on the club. Pardubice won the 2004–05 Czech Extraliga for the first time in 16 years, and Hemský was named playoff most valuable player for his efforts.

During the 2005–06 season, Hemský had a career year, setting personal bests in every major statistical category. He scored 19 goals, 58 assists, and 77 points while playing in all but one game for the Oilers during the regular season. The Oilers captured the eighth and final playoff seed in the Western Conference. In the playoffs, the Oilers went on to eliminate the Detroit Red Wings in six games in round one, then beat the San Jose Sharks in six games as well in round two. In the Conference finals, the Oilers knocked off the Anaheim Ducks in five games. The Oilers, however, lost the Stanley Cup Finals in seven games to the Carolina Hurricanes.

Hemský was an important part of the Oilers run to the Finals. Among his opportune goals were two he scored in the third period of game six against the Detroit Red Wings, including the series-winner. Hemský underwent a biopsy on an inflamed lymph node on the right side of his neck during the playoffs. Results have not been made public.

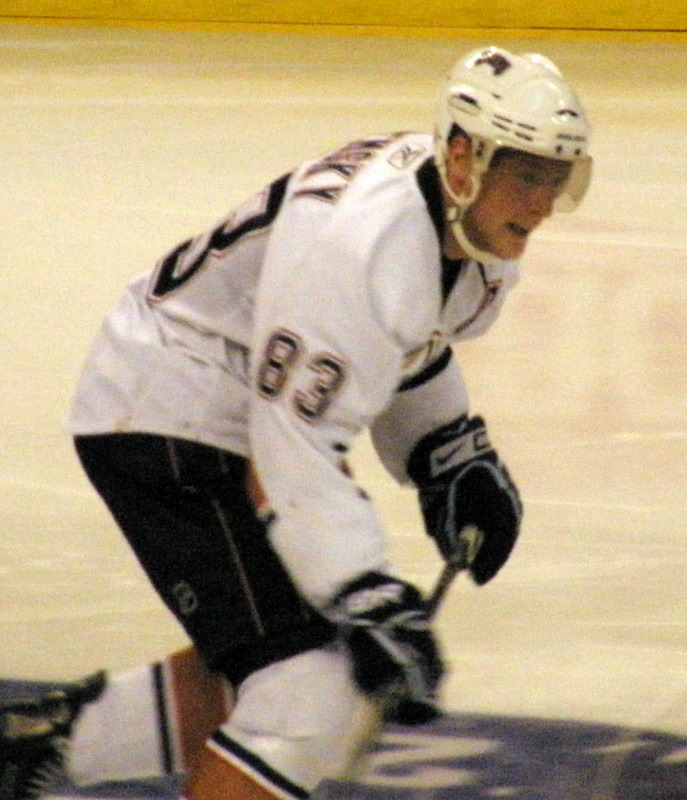
Hemský in 2009

Edmonton re-signed Hemský in the summer of 2006 to a six-year contract worth US$24.60 million. The 2006–07 campaign saw Hemský notch 53 points in 64 games, missing 18 games due to shoulder injuries. During the season, on 4 January 2007, Hemský managed to tie a game against the Dallas Stars after Patrik Štefan fell in front of the Oilers' empty net, turning the puck over to Edmonton. After receiving a stretch pass from Ryan Smyth, Hemský managed to slip the puck into the Stars net with two seconds remaining on the clock. Despite Hemský's efforts, Edmonton would ultimately lose the game to Dallas in a shootout. The singular point gained from the shootout loss would end up placing the Oilers one place ahead of the Chicago Blackhawks, who would ultimately win the first overall pick and draft forward Patrick Kane. The 2007–08 season was a short one, as the Oilers missed the playoffs. Hemský finished first on the team overall in points scoring 71 and was first in assists with 51. He sat in third place for goals with 20, a career-high. The 2008–09 campaign was another that saw injuries for Hemský, who played 72 out of the 82 regular season games and finished first on the team with 23 goals and 43 assists for 66 points. Hemský recorded seven goals and 15 assists during the first 22 games of the 2009–10 season before suffering a left shoulder injury following a check from behind by Los Angeles Kings forward Michal Handzuš. The injury required surgery and Hemský missed the remainder of the regular season.

In the 2010–11 season, Hemský was named to the 2011 NHL All-Star Game but did not participate due to a concussion. Hemský missed the remainder of the season due to a shoulder injury. Hemský, Taylor Hall, and Sam Gagner, led the Oilers with 42 points for the majority of the season, until the trio of injured players were surpassed by Jordan Eberle. Hemský recorded his 400th career point scoring a goal, in a 9–2 victory over the Chicago Blackhawks.

After missing the first part of the 2011–12 season due to injury, Hemský struggled, posting just 11 points in his first 25 games, including a nine-game pointless streak. He picked up the pace thereafter, scoring 15 points in his next 22 games, leading the Oilers to sign him to a two-year, $10 million deal on 24 February 2012. On 21 March 2012, Hemský recorded his first career NHL hat trick, finishing with four points in a 6–3 victory over the Nashville Predators. After coming back from two shoulder surgeries, Hemský had a disappointing start to the season and finished the year with 36 points in 69 games.

=== Ottawa Senators ===
In the final year of his contract and with the Oilers again out of playoff contention, on 5 March 2014 Hemský was traded to the Ottawa Senators for a fifth-round pick in the 2014 NHL entry draft and a third-round pick in the 2015 NHL entry draft. He quickly found success on Ottawa's top line alongside center Jason Spezza, recording six points in his first three games. He finished the season with 17 points in 20 games as the Senators fell short of the playoffs.

=== Dallas Stars ===
Unable to agree to a new contract with the Senators, Hemský signed as a free agent to a three-year, $12 million contract with the Dallas Stars on 1 July 2014. In signing with the Stars, he was joined by Senators linemate Jason Spezza, who was coincidentally traded to the Stars earlier in the day. He also joined former Oilers teammate Shawn Horcoff in Dallas.

=== Montreal Canadiens ===
Going to free agency, Hemský signed a one-year, $1 million contract with the Montreal Canadiens on 3 July 2017. A severe concussion suffered during a game against the Anaheim Ducks on 20 October ended his season after only seven games. By September 2018, the Canadiens had not renewed his contract and no other team had yet shown interest, although symptoms from the concussion were gone.

=== Retirement ===
On 15 May 2020, Hemský officially announced his retirement from professional hockey.

== International play ==
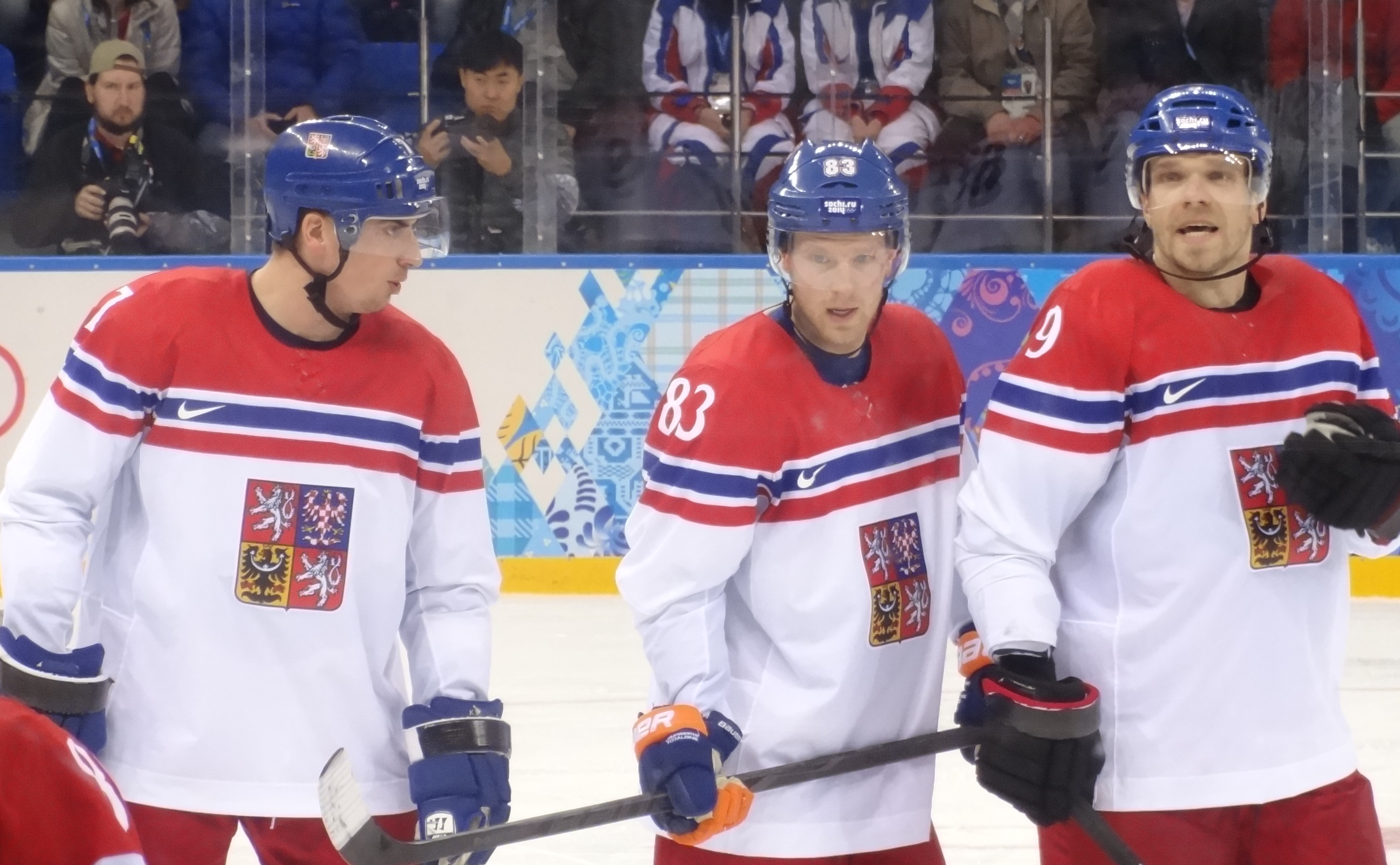
- Hemský, middle, with Czech Republic at the 2014 Winter Olympics

Medal record

Representing Czech Republic

Ice hockey

Olympic Games
| Bronze medal – third place | 2006 Turin | |

Ice Hockey World Championships
| Gold medal – first place | 2005 Austria | |
| Bronze medal – third place | 2012 Finland | |

Inline hockey

IIHF InLine Hockey World Championships

Hemský was a member of the bronze medal-winning Czech team at the 2006 Winter Olympics. Czech ice hockey icon Jaromír Jágr had a large influence on Hemský's selection, to the point where he insisted that Hemský skates on his line. The two had previously played together on the Czech team that won the 2005 IIHF World Championship during the NHL's 2004–05 lockout season. Hemský scored twice in the Olympic tournament, and the Czech Republic defeated Russia in the bronze-medal game. He missed the 2010 Winter Olympics, but was selected for 2014 Olympic ice hockey tournament at Sochi in 2014 and became the highest scorer for the Czech team during the 2014 games, with three goals and four points. Hemský has also represented his country in three International Ice Hockey Federation (IIHF) world ice hockey tournaments, winning a gold medal with the team in 2005 and bronze in 2012. He made his first appearance in a Czech uniform for the 2002 World Junior Ice Hockey Championships.

In addition to representing Czech Republic in ice hockey, Hemský represented his country in the IIHF inline hockey World Championship tournaments in 2008 and 2012. In the 2008 tournament, Hemský tied for fourth place in scoring with six goals and five assists while leading the Czech Republic to a fifth-place finish.

== Personal life ==
Hemský and his wife have two sons.

On 13 December 2017, Hemský, along with teammates Jordie Benn, Andrew Shaw, Karl Alzner, Jeff Petry, Charles Hudon, and Artturi Lehkonen, all went bald as part of the Leucan Shaved Head Challenge, as well as raised $33,000 for children battling cancer.

== Career statistics ==
=== Regular season and playoffs ===
| | | | Regular season | | | | | Playoffs |
| Season | Team | League | GP | G | A | Pts | PIM | GP | G | A | Pts | PIM |
|---|---|---|---|---|---|---|---|---|---|---|---|---|
| 1999–2000 | HC IPB Pojišťovna Pardubice | CZE U20 | 45 | 20 | 36 | 56 | 54 | 7 | 4 | 14 | 18 | 36 |
| 1999–2000 | HC IPB Pojišťovna Pardubice | ELH | 4 | 0 | 1 | 1 | 0 | — | — | — | — | — |
| 2000–01 | Hull Olympiques | QMJHL | 68 | 36 | 64 | 100 | 67 | 5 | 2 | 3 | 5 | 2 |
| 2001–02 | Hull Olympiques | QMJHL | 53 | 27 | 70 | 97 | 86 | 10 | 6 | 10 | 16 | 6 |
| 2002–03 | Edmonton Oilers | NHL | 59 | 6 | 24 | 30 | 14 | 6 | 0 | 0 | 0 | 0 |
| 2003–04 | Edmonton Oilers | NHL | 71 | 12 | 22 | 34 | 14 | — | — | — | — | — |
| 2004–05 | HC Moeller Pardubice | ELH | 47 | 13 | 18 | 31 | 28 | 16 | 4 | 10 | 14 | 26 |
| 2005–06 | Edmonton Oilers | NHL | 81 | 19 | 58 | 77 | 64 | 24 | 6 | 11 | 17 | 14 |
| 2006–07 | Edmonton Oilers | NHL | 64 | 13 | 40 | 53 | 40 | — | — | — | — | — |
| 2007–08 | Edmonton Oilers | NHL | 74 | 20 | 51 | 71 | 34 | — | — | — | — | — |
| 2008–09 | Edmonton Oilers | NHL | 72 | 23 | 43 | 66 | 32 | — | — | — | — | — |
| 2009–10 | Edmonton Oilers | NHL | 22 | 7 | 15 | 22 | 8 | — | — | — | — | — |
| 2010–11 | Edmonton Oilers | NHL | 47 | 14 | 28 | 42 | 18 | — | — | — | — | — |
| 2011–12 | Edmonton Oilers | NHL | 69 | 10 | 26 | 36 | 43 | — | — | — | — | — |
| 2012–13 | HC ČSOB Pojišťovna Pardubice | ELH | 27 | 14 | 18 | 32 | 52 | — | — | — | — | — |
| 2012–13 | Edmonton Oilers | NHL | 38 | 9 | 11 | 20 | 16 | — | — | — | — | — |
| 2013–14 | Edmonton Oilers | NHL | 55 | 9 | 17 | 26 | 20 | — | — | — | — | — |
| 2013–14 | Ottawa Senators | NHL | 20 | 4 | 13 | 17 | 4 | — | — | — | — | — |
| 2014–15 | Dallas Stars | NHL | 76 | 11 | 21 | 32 | 16 | — | — | — | — | — |
| 2015–16 | Dallas Stars | NHL | 75 | 13 | 26 | 39 | 20 | 13 | 1 | 3 | 4 | 2 |
| 2016–17 | Dallas Stars | NHL | 15 | 4 | 3 | 7 | 0 | — | — | — | — | — |
| 2017–18 | Montreal Canadiens | NHL | 7 | 0 | 0 | 0 | 10 | — | — | — | — | — |
| NHL totals | | | 845 | 174 | 398 | 572 | 353 | 43 | 7 | 14 | 21 | 16 |

=== International ===
| Year | Team | Event | Result | GP | G | A | Pts | PIM |
|---|---|---|---|---|---|---|---|---|
| 2002 | Czech Republic | WJC | 7th | 7 | 3 | 6 | 9 | 6 |
| 2005 | Czech Republic | WC | 1st place, gold medalist(s) | 7 | 2 | 1 | 3 | 2 |
| 2006 | Czech Republic | OG | 3rd place, bronze medalist(s) | 8 | 1 | 2 | 3 | 2 |
| 2009 | Czech Republic | WC | 6th | 7 | 2 | 4 | 6 | 4 |
| 2012 | Czech Republic | WC | 3rd place, bronze medalist(s) | 10 | 5 | 3 | 8 | 8 |
| 2014 | Czech Republic | OG | 6th | 5 | 3 | 1 | 4 | 0 |
| 2016 | Czech Republic | WCH | 6th | 3 | 0 | 2 | 2 | 2 |
| Junior totals | | | | 7 | 3 | 6 | 9 | 6 |
| Senior totals | | | | 40 | 13 | 12 | 25 | 18 |

== Awards and honours ==
=== Individual ===
- 2001 QMJHL All-Rookie team
- 2001 QMJHL Mike Bossy Trophy
- 2001 CHL All-Rookie Team (Hemský was to also represent the QMJHL in the 2001 CHL Top Prospects Game, but an injury forced him to withdraw)
- 2001 QMJHL Rookie of the Month (January)
- 2002 QMJHL second All-Star team
- 2002 CHL third All-Star team
- 2005 Czech Extraliga Playoff MVP
- Selected to play in the 2011 NHL All-Star Game (did not play due to injury)

=== Team ===
| Year | Tournament | Team | Result |
|---|---|---|---|
| 2005 | IIHF World Championship | Czech Republic national team | Gold medal |
| 2005 | Czech Extraliga playoffs | HC Moeller Pardubice | Czech Extraliga champion |
| 2006 | Winter Olympics | Czech Republic national team | Bronze medal |
| 2012 | IIHF World Championship | Czech Republic national team | Bronze medal |

Awards and achievements
| Preceded by Antoine Vermette | Mike Bossy Trophy winner 2000–01 | Succeeded by Pierre-Marc Bouchard |
| Preceded by Alexei Mikhnov | Edmonton Oilers first-round draft pick 2001 | Succeeded by Jesse Niinimäki |
| Preceded by Altrichter Martin | Czech Extraliga playoff MVP; 2005 | Succeeded by Petr Bříza |
