= Vyacheslav Trukhno =

Russian ice hockey player

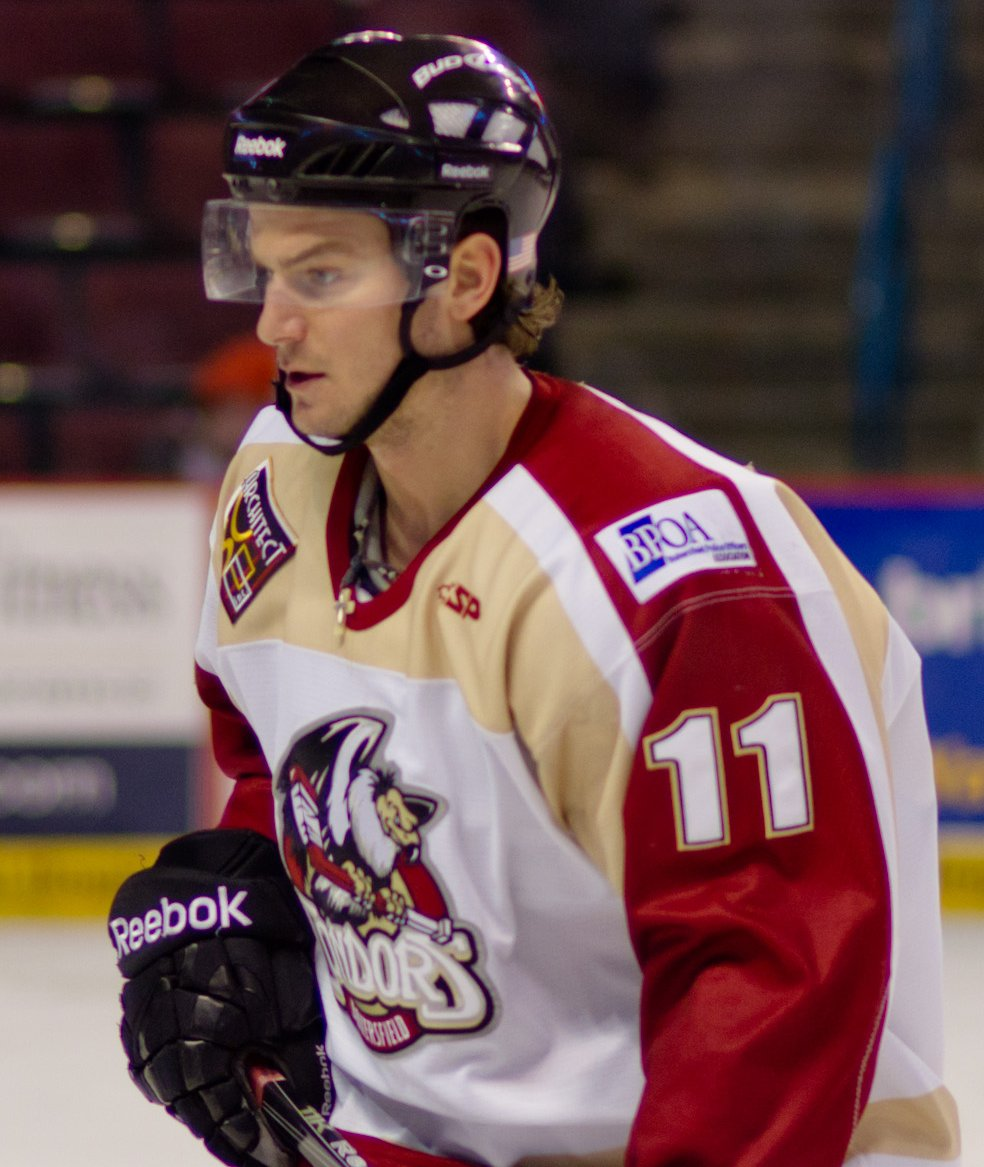
- Born: February 22, 1987 (age 39) Khimki, Russia
- Height: 6 ft 1 in (185 cm)
- Weight: 197 lb (89 kg; 14 st 1 lb)
- Position: Centre
- Shot: Left
- SHL team Former teams: Karlskrona HK; EBEL; KHL Medveščak; SHL; Djurgårdens IF; Luleå Hockey
- NHL draft: 120th overall, 2005; Edmonton Oilers
- Playing career: 2007–2020

Vyacheslav "Slava" Trukhno (born February 22, 1987) is a Russian professional ice hockey player. Trukhno was selected by the Edmonton Oilers in the 4th round (120th overall) of the 2005 NHL entry draft.

He was playing for KHL Medveščak in the Erste Bank Eishockey Liga until 2012.

== Awards and honours ==
- QMJHL All-Rookie Team (2004–05)
- Canadian Major Junior All-Rookie Team (2004–05)
- QMJHL First All-Star Team (2006–07)

== Career statistics ==
=== Regular season and playoffs ===
			Regular season					Playoffs
Season	Team	League	GP	G	A	Pts	PIM	GP	G	A	Pts	PIM
2002–03	Rungsted Cobras	DEN	27	7	4	11	8	12	0	1	1	8
2003–04	Rungsted Cobras	DEN	35	12	11	23	18	7	0	0	0	8
2004–05	PEI Rocket	QMJHL	64	24	34	59	57	—	—	—	—	—
2005–06	PEI Rocket	QMJHL	60	28	68	96	81	3	2	2	4	0
2006–07	Gatineau Olympiques	QMJHL	60	25	77	102	67	5	0	6	6	19
2007–08	Springfield Falcons	AHL	64	14	21	35	44	—	—	—	—	—
2008–09	Springfield Falcons	AHL	56	7	19	26	35	—	—	—	—	—
2009–10	Springfield Falcons	AHL	73	12	14	26	57	—	—	—	—	—
2010–11	Bakersfield Condors	ECHL	51	12	40	52	73	4	0	2	2	2
2010–11	Peoria Rivermen	AHL	3	1	1	2	2	—	—	—	—	—
2011–12	KHL Medveščak Zagreb	AUT	34	17	18	35	76	9	2	3	5	15
2012–13	Asplöven HC	Allsv	50	21	22	43	50	—	—	—	—	—
2013–14	Luleå HF	SHL	48	0	6	6	40	1	0	0	0	0
2014–15	Djurgårdens IF	SHL	25	2	5	7	12	—	—	—	—	—
2014–15	Karlskrona HK	Allsv	15	3	7	10	16	4	1	2	3	6
2015–16	Karlskrona HK	J20	1	0	2	2	0	—	—	—	—	—
2015–16	Karlskrona HK	SHL	38	0	4	4	16	—	—	—	—	—
2016–17	HC ’05 iClinic Banská Bystrica	SVK	47	8	20	28	16	11	1	4	5	6
2017–18	Lørenskog IK	NOR	29	8	19	27	65	2	0	0	0	6
2018–19	Nippon Paper Cranes	ALH	33	8	15	23	48	6	2	0	2	2
2019–20	HK Olimp	LAT	15	5	5	10	0	—	—	—	—	—
2019–20	GKS Tychy	POL	4	1	0	1	2	4	0	2	2	4
AHL totals			196	34	55	89	138	—	—	—	—	—
SHL totals			111	2	15	17	68	1	0	0	0	0

=== International ===
Year	Team	Event	GP	G	A	Pts	PIM
2005	Russia	WJC18	6	0	1	1	6
Junior totals			6	0	1	1	6
