= 2005–06 Dallas Stars season =

National Hockey League team season

2005–06 Dallas Stars
- Pacific Division champions
- Division: 1st Pacific
- Conference: 2nd Western
- 2005–06 record: 53–23–6
- Home record: 28–11–2
- Road record: 25–12–4
- Goals for: 265
- Goals against: 218

Team information
- General manager: Doug Armstrong
- Coach: Dave Tippett
- Captain: Mike Modano
- Alternate captains: Brenden Morrow; Sergei Zubov
- Arena: American Airlines Center
- Average attendance: 17,828
- Minor league affiliates: Iowa Stars; Idaho Steelheads

Team leaders
- Goals: Jere Lehtinen (33)
- Assists: Sergei Zubov (58)
- Points: Mike Modano (77)
- Penalty minutes: Brenden Morrow (183)
- Plus/minus: Brenden Morrow (+30)
- Wins: Marty Turco (41)
- Goals against average: Marty Turco (2.55)

The 2005–06 Dallas Stars season was the Stars' 13th season in the city of Dallas, the 39th overall of the franchise. This was the season following the 2004–05 season which was canceled due to the 2004–05 NHL lockout.

== Regular season ==
=== Final standings ===
Pacific Division
No.	CR		GP	W	L	OTL	GF	GA	Pts
1	2	Dallas Stars	82	53	23	6	265	218	112
2	5	San Jose Sharks	82	44	27	11	266	242	99
3	6	Mighty Ducks of Anaheim	82	43	27	12	254	229	98
4	10	Los Angeles Kings	82	42	35	5	249	270	89
5	12	Phoenix Coyotes	82	38	39	5	246	271	81

Western Conference
R		Div	GP	W	L	OTL	GF	GA	Pts
1	P- Detroit Red Wings	CE	82	58	16	8	305	209	124
2	Y- Dallas Stars	PA	82	53	23	6	265	218	112
3	Y- Calgary Flames	NW	82	46	25	11	218	200	103
4	X- Nashville Predators	CE	82	49	25	8	259	227	106
5	X- San Jose Sharks	PA	82	44	27	11	266	242	99
6	X- Mighty Ducks of Anaheim	PA	82	43	27	12	254	229	98
7	X- Colorado Avalanche	NW	82	43	30	9	283	257	95
8	X- Edmonton Oilers	NW	82	41	28	13	256	251	95
8.5
9	Vancouver Canucks	NW	82	42	32	8	256	255	92
8	Los Angeles Kings	PA	82	42	35	5	249	270	89
11	Minnesota Wild	NW	82	38	36	8	231	215	84
12	Phoenix Coyotes	PA	82	38	39	5	246	271	81
13	Columbus Blue Jackets	CE	82	35	43	4	223	279	74
14	Chicago Blackhawks	CE	82	26	43	13	211	285	65
15	St. Louis Blues	CE	82	21	46	15	197	292	57

Divisions: CE – Central, PA – Pacific, NW – Northwest

P – Clinched Presidents Trophy; Y – Clinched division; X – Clinched playoff spot

== Schedule and results ==
=== Regular season ===
2005–06 regular season
October: 6–4–1 (home: 3–3–1; road: 3–1–0)

Game	Date	Score	Opponent	Record	Recap
1	October 5, 2005	5–4	Los Angeles Kings (2005–06)	1–0–0	W
2	October 8, 2005	2–3	Colorado Avalanche (2005–06)	1–1–0	L
3	October 11, 2005	3–2	Phoenix Coyotes (2005–06)	2–1–0	W
4	October 13, 2005	3–2 OT	@ Calgary Flames (2005–06)	3–1–0	W
5	October 14, 2005	3–2	@ Edmonton Oilers (2005–06)	4–1–0	W
6	October 16, 2005	2–5	@ Vancouver Canucks (2005–06)	4–2–0	L
7	October 20, 2005	2–7	Los Angeles Kings (2005–06)	4–3–0	L
8	October 22, 2005	2–1	Calgary Flames (2005–06)	5–3–0	W
9	October 26, 2005	4–5 OT	San Jose Sharks (2005–06)	5–3–1	OTL
10	October 28, 2005	3–5	Edmonton Oilers (2005–06)	5–4–1	L
11	October 29, 2005	5–3	@ Phoenix Coyotes (2005–06)	6–4–1	W

November: 10–3–0 (home: 5–2–0; road: 5–1–0)

Game	Date	Score	Opponent	Record	Recap
12	November 2, 2005	3–6	Los Angeles Kings (2005–06)	6–5–1	L
13	November 4, 2005	9–1	Chicago Blackhawks (2005–06)	7–5–1	W
14	November 5, 2005	3–2 SO	@ Colorado Avalanche (2005–06)	8–5–1	W
15	November 7, 2005	4–0	Edmonton Oilers (2005–06)	9–5–1	W
16	November 10, 2005	3–5	@ Nashville Predators (2005–06)	9–6–1	L
17	November 12, 2005	3–2 SO	@ San Jose Sharks (2005–06)	10–6–1	W
18	November 13, 2005	3–1	@ Mighty Ducks of Anaheim (2005–06)	11–6–1	W
19	November 16, 2005	4–2	@ Mighty Ducks of Anaheim (2005–06)	12–6–1	W
20	November 18, 2005	6–3	Columbus Blue Jackets (2005–06)	13–6–1	W
21	November 23, 2005	3–1	Mighty Ducks of Anaheim (2005–06)	14–6–1	W
22	November 25, 2005	1–4	Phoenix Coyotes (2005–06)	14–7–1	L
23	November 26, 2005	3–1	@ Nashville Predators (2005–06)	15–7–1	W
24	November 30, 2005	4–1	San Jose Sharks (2005–06)	16–7–1	W

December: 8–5–0 (home: 3–3–0; road: 5–2–0)

Game	Date	Score	Opponent	Record	Recap
25	December 2, 2005	5–4 SO	Carolina Hurricanes (2005–06)	17–7–1	W
26	December 7, 2005	4–3	Florida Panthers (2005–06)	18–7–1	W
27	December 10, 2005	2–1	@ Toronto Maple Leafs (2005–06)	19–7–1	W
28	December 14, 2005	3–4	@ Buffalo Sabres (2005–06)	19–8–1	L
29	December 15, 2005	2–0	@ Ottawa Senators (2005–06)	20–8–1	W
30	December 18, 2005	5–3	@ Chicago Blackhawks (2005–06)	21–8–1	W
31	December 19, 2005	1–2	@ Minnesota Wild (2005–06)	21–9–1	L
32	December 21, 2005	5–3	@ Columbus Blue Jackets (2005–06)	22–9–1	W
33	December 23, 2005	2–3	Phoenix Coyotes (2005–06)	22–10–1	L
34	December 26, 2005	6–1	@ St. Louis Blues (2005–06)	23–10–1	W
35	December 27, 2005	1–4	Detroit Red Wings (2005–06)	23–11–1	L
36	December 29, 2005	3–0	St. Louis Blues (2005–06)	24–11–1	W
37	December 31, 2005	2–3	Los Angeles Kings (2005–06)	24–12–1	L

January: 11–3–1 (home: 7–2–0; road: 4–1–1)

Game	Date	Score	Opponent	Record	Recap
38	January 2, 2006	2–3 OT	@ Los Angeles Kings (2005–06)	24–12–2	OTL
39	January 4, 2006	3–1	Vancouver Canucks (2005–06)	25–12–2	W
40	January 6, 2006	4–3 SO	Mighty Ducks of Anaheim (2005–06)	26–12–2	W
41	January 8, 2006	6–3	@ Detroit Red Wings (2005–06)	27–12–2	W
42	January 9, 2006	2–1	@ Minnesota Wild (2005–06)	28–12–2	W
43	January 12, 2006	4–1	Washington Capitals (2005–06)	29–12–2	W
44	January 14, 2006	2–1 SO	@ Boston Bruins (2005–06)	30–12–2	W
45	January 16, 2006	2–4	@ Montreal Canadiens (2005–06)	30–13–2	L
46	January 18, 2006	2–5	Atlanta Thrashers (2005–06)	30–14–2	L
47	January 20, 2006	3–6	Tampa Bay Lightning (2005–06)	30–15–2	L
48	January 23, 2006	4–1	Phoenix Coyotes (2005–06)	31–15–2	W
49	January 25, 2006	4–3 SO	St. Louis Blues (2005–06)	32–15–2	W
50	January 26, 2006	3–2 SO	@ Colorado Avalanche (2005–06)	33–15–2	W
51	January 28, 2006	2–1 SO	Detroit Red Wings (2005–06)	34–15–2	W
52	January 30, 2006	3–2 OT	San Jose Sharks (2005–06)	35–15–2	W

February: 3–2–1 (home: 2–0–0; road: 1–2–1)

Game	Date	Score	Opponent	Record	Recap
53	February 1, 2006	2–1	Nashville Predators (2005–06)	36–15–2	W
54	February 4, 2006	3–4 OT	@ St. Louis Blues (2005–06)	36–15–3	OTL
55	February 6, 2006	4–2	Nashville Predators (2005–06)	37–15–3	W
56	February 9, 2006	5–1	@ Phoenix Coyotes (2005–06)	38–15–3	W
57	February 10, 2006	3–6	@ San Jose Sharks (2005–06)	38–16–3	L
58	February 12, 2006	5–6	@ Los Angeles Kings (2005–06)	38–17–3	L

March: 11–3–1 (home: 6–1–0; road: 5–2–1)

Game	Date	Score	Opponent	Record	Recap
59	March 2, 2006	2–6	@ Phoenix Coyotes (2005–06)	38–18–3	L
60	March 4, 2006	5–3	Colorado Avalanche (2005–06)	39–18–3	W
61	March 5, 2006	7–2	@ Chicago Blackhawks (2005–06)	40–18–3	W
62	March 7, 2006	4–3 SO	@ Edmonton Oilers (2005–06)	41–18–3	W
63	March 9, 2006	0–1	@ Calgary Flames (2005–06)	41–19–3	L
64	March 11, 2006	2–1	@ Vancouver Canucks (2005–06)	42–19–3	W
65	March 13, 2006	4–2	Vancouver Canucks (2005–06)	43–19–3	W
66	March 16, 2006	4–1	@ Los Angeles Kings (2005–06)	44–19–3	W
67	March 18, 2006	4–3 SO	@ San Jose Sharks (2005–06)	45–19–3	W
68	March 20, 2006	1–2	Mighty Ducks of Anaheim (2005–06)	45–20–3	L
69	March 22, 2006	4–2	Minnesota Wild (2005–06)	46–20–3	W
70	March 24, 2006	3–2 SO	Chicago Blackhawks (2005–06)	47–20–3	W
71	March 26, 2006	3–2	Calgary Flames (2005–06)	48–20–3	W
72	March 29, 2006	2–1	Mighty Ducks of Anaheim (2005–06)	49–20–3	W
73	March 31, 2006	4–5 SO	@ Mighty Ducks of Anaheim (2005–06)	49–20–4	OTL

April: 4–3–2 (home: 2–0–1; road: 2–3–1)

Game	Date	Score	Opponent	Record	Recap
74	April 1, 2006	0–1	@ Los Angeles Kings (2005–06)	49–21–4	L
75	April 3, 2006	2–3 OT	San Jose Sharks (2005–06)	49–21–5	OTL
76	April 6, 2006	5–3	@ Mighty Ducks of Anaheim (2005–06)	50–21–5	W
77	April 8, 2006	3–2 SO	@ Phoenix Coyotes (2005–06)	51–21–5	W
78	April 9, 2006	1–4	@ San Jose Sharks (2005–06)	51–22–5	L
79	April 11, 2006	3–2	Columbus Blue Jackets (2005–06)	52–22–5	W
80	April 15, 2006	4–3 OT	Minnesota Wild (2005–06)	53–22–5	W
81	April 17, 2006	2–3	@ Detroit Red Wings (2005–06)	53–23–5	L
82	April 18, 2006	4–5 OT	@ Columbus Blue Jackets (2005–06)	53–23–6	OTL

Legend: W Win (2 points) L Loss (0 points) OTL Overtime/shootout loss (1 point)

=== Playoffs ===
2006 Stanley Cup playoffs
Western Conference Quarterfinals vs. (7) Colorado Avalanche – Avalanche win 4–1

Game	Date	Score	Opponent	Series	Recap
1	April 22, 2006	2–5	Colorado Avalanche	Avalanche lead 1–0	L
2	April 24, 2006	4–5 OT	Colorado Avalanche	Avalanche lead 2–0	L
3	April 26, 2006	3–4 OT	@ Colorado Avalanche	Avalanche lead 3–0	L
4	April 28, 2006	4–1	@ Colorado Avalanche	Avalanche lead 3–1	W
5	April 30, 2006	2–3 OT	Colorado Avalanche	Avalanche win 4–1	L

Legend: W Win L Loss

== Player statistics ==
=== Scoring ===
- Position abbreviations: C = Center; D = Defense; G = Goaltender; LW = Left wing; RW = Right wing
- † = Joined team via a transaction (e.g., trade, waivers, signing) during the season. Stats reflect time with the Stars only.
- ‡ = Left team via a transaction (e.g., trade, waivers, release) during the season. Stats reflect time with the Stars only.

No.	Player	Pos	Regular season						Playoffs					
No.	Player	Pos	GP	G	A	Pts	+/-	PIM	GP	G	A	Pts	+/-	PIM
9	Mike Modano	C	78	27	50	77	23	58	5	1	3	4	0	4
44	Jason Arnott	C	81	32	44	76	13	102	5	0	3	3	−1	4
56	Sergei Zubov	D	78	13	58	71	20	46	5	1	5	6	−1	6
10	Brenden Morrow	LW	81	23	42	65	30	183	5	1	5	6	−1	6
36	Jussi Jokinen	C	81	17	38	55	2	30	5	2	1	3	1	0
26	Jere Lehtinen	RW	80	33	19	52	9	30	5	3	1	4	−1	0
43	Philippe Boucher	D	66	16	27	43	28	77	5	0	1	1	0	2
13	Bill Guerin	RW	70	13	27	40	0	115	5	3	1	4	−2	0
14	Stu Barnes	C	78	15	21	36	9	44	5	1	1	2	0	0
39	Niko Kapanen	C	81	14	21	35	−10	36	5	0	1	1	−2	10
20	Antti Miettinen	RW	79	11	20	31	0	46	5	0	1	1	−1	8
29	Steve Ott	C	82	5	17	22	1	178	5	0	1	1	0	2
3	Stephane Robidas	D	75	5	15	20	15	67	5	0	2	2	−1	4
15	Niklas Hagman†	LW	54	6	9	15	−2	16	5	2	1	3	−1	4
41	Martin Skoula‡	D	61	4	11	15	6	36	—	—	—	—	—	—
6	Trevor Daley	D	81	3	11	14	−2	87	3	0	0	0	−3	0
42	Jon Klemm	D	76	4	7	11	−3	60	5	1	0	1	−1	0
11	Jaroslav Svoboda	LW	43	4	3	7	−3	22	2	0	0	0	−1	2
4	Janne Niinimaa†	D	22	2	4	6	−5	24	4	0	1	1	0	8
23	Mathias Tjarnqvist	RW	33	2	4	6	4	18	—	—	—	—	—	—
24	Nathan Perrott†	RW	23	2	1	3	2	54	—	—	—	—	—	—
1	Johan Hedberg	G	19	0	2	2		6	—	—	—	—	—	—
2	Willie Mitchell†	D	16	0	2	2	4	26	5	0	0	0	0	2
35	Marty Turco	G	68	0	2	2		28	5	0	0	0		2
21	Junior Lessard	RW	5	1	0	1	0	12	—	—	—	—	—	—
25	Jeremy Stevenson†	LW	16	1	0	1	−3	21	1	0	0	0	0	0
55	John Erskine‡	D	26	0	0	0	−3	62	—	—	—	—	—	—
38	Dan Jancevski	D	2	0	0	0	1	0	—	—	—	—	—	—
28	David Oliver	RW	3	0	0	0	−1	0	—	—	—	—	—	—
53	Vojtech Polak	LW	3	0	0	0	−1	0	—	—	—	—	—	—
27	Patrick Traverse	D	1	0	0	0	0	0	—	—	—	—	—	—

=== Goaltending ===
No.	Player	Regular season										Playoffs								
No.	Player	GP	W	L	OT	SA	GA	GAA	SV%	SO	TOI	GP	W	L	SA	GA	GAA	SV%	SO	TOI
35	Marty Turco	68	41	19	5	1624	166	2.55	.898	3	3910	5	1	4	136	18	3.39	.868	0	319
1	Johan Hedberg	19	12	4	1	472	48	2.67	.898	0	1079	–	–	–	–	–	–	–	–	–

== Awards and records ==
=== Awards ===
Type	Award/honor	Recipient	Ref
League (annual)	NHL Second All-Star Team	Sergei Zubov (Defense)	
League (in-season)	NHL Defensive Player of the Month	Marty Turco (November)	
League (in-season)	NHL Defensive Player of the Week	Marty Turco (November 14)	
League (in-season)	NHL Defensive Player of the Week	Marty Turco (January 30)	
Team	Star of the Game Award	Jason Arnott	

=== Milestones ===
Milestone	Player	Date	Ref
First game	Jussi Jokinen	October 5, 2005	
First game	Junior Lessard	October 22, 2005	
First game	Vojtech Polak	October 22, 2005	
First game	Dan Jancevski	February 4, 2006	

== Transactions ==
The Stars were involved in the following transactions from February 17, 2005, the day after the 2004–05 NHL season was officially cancelled, through June 19, 2006, the day of the deciding game of the 2006 Stanley Cup Finals.

=== Trades ===
Date	Details		Ref
July 30, 2005	To Tampa Bay Lightning: 6th-round pick in 2005	To Dallas Stars: 5th-round pick in 2006	
November 6, 2005	To Toronto Maple Leafs: 6th-round pick in 2006	To Dallas Stars: Nathan Perrott	
December 12, 2005	To Florida Panthers: 7th-round pick in 2007	To Dallas Stars: Niklas Hagman	
January 10, 2006	To New York Islanders: John Erskine; 2nd-round pick in 2006	To Dallas Stars: Janne Niinimaa; 5th-round pick in 2007	
March 9, 2006	To Minnesota Wild: Shawn Belle; Martin Skoula	To Dallas Stars: Willie Mitchell; 2nd-round pick in 2007	
June 14, 2006	To New York Rangers: Conditional draft pick in 2008	To Dallas Stars: Rights to Mike Green	

=== Players acquired ===
Date	Player	Former team	Term	Via	Ref
August 3, 2005	Martin Skoula	Anaheim Mighty Ducks	2-year	Free agency	
August 5, 2005	Johan Hedberg	Leksands IF (SHL)	1-year	Free agency	
August 5, 2005	Mario Scalzo	Rimouski Oceanic (QMJHL)	3-year	Free agency	
August 6, 2005	Stephane Robidas	Chicago Blackhawks	2-year	Free agency	
August 15, 2005	Garrett Burnett	Anaheim Mighty Ducks	1-year	Free agency	
February 15, 2006	Jeremy Stevenson	Nashville Predators		Waivers	

=== Players lost ===
Date	Player	New team	Via (Note: In parentheses is the player's free agency group on August 1 if applicable.)	Ref
July 28, 2005	Pierre Turgeon	Colorado Avalanche (Note: Turgeon signed with Colorado on August 3.)	Compliance buyout	
August 1, 2005	Aaron Downey	St. Louis Blues	Free agency (UFA)	
August 9, 2005	Rob DiMaio	Tampa Bay Lightning	Free agency (III)	
September 13, 2005	Don Sweeney		Retirement (III)	

=== Signings ===
Date	Player	Term	Contract type	Ref
July 27, 2005	Jaroslav Svoboda	1-year	Option exercised	
July 27, 2005	Francis Wathier	3-year	Entry-level	
July 28, 2005	Shawn Belle	3-year	Entry-level	
July 28, 2005	B. J. Crombeen	3-year	Entry-level	
July 31, 2005	Sergei Zubov	3-year	Re-signing	
August 3, 2005	Mike Modano	5-year	Re-signing	
August 3, 2005	Vojtech Polak	3-year	Entry-level	
August 3, 2005	Mathias Tjarnqvist	1-year	Re-signing	
August 3, 2005	Patrick Traverse	1-year	Re-signing	
August 5, 2005	Junior Lessard	1-year	Re-signing	
August 11, 2005	Niko Kapanen	1-year	Re-signing	
August 11, 2005	Steve Ott	1-year	Re-signing	
August 12, 2005	Yared Hagos	2-year	Entry-level	
August 12, 2005	David Oliver	1-year	Re-signing	
August 12, 2005	Mike Smith	1-year	Re-signing	
August 15, 2005	Jason Arnott	1-year	Re-signing	
August 15, 2005	Antti Miettinen	2-year	Re-signing	
August 15, 2005	Mike Siklenka	1-year	Re-signing	
August 19, 2005	Dan Ellis	1-year	Re-signing	
August 19, 2005	John Erskine	1-year	Re-signing	
August 19, 2005	Brenden Morrow	2-year	Re-signing	
August 19, 2005	Janos Vas	3-year	Entry-level	
August 24, 2005	Loui Eriksson	3-year	Entry-level	
August 24, 2005	Nicklas Grossmann	3-year	Entry-level	
August 24, 2005	Dan Jancevski	1-year	Re-signing	
August 24, 2005	Jussi Jokinen	2-year	Re-signing	
August 24, 2005	Tobias Stephan	3-year	Entry-level	
September 30, 2005	Mark Fistric	3-year	Entry-level	
January 5, 2006	Marty Turco	4-year	Extension	
March 3, 2006	Philippe Boucher	3-year	Extension	
May 17, 2006	Perttu Lindgren	3-year	Entry-level	
May 19, 2006	John Lammers	3-year	Entry-level	
May 23, 2006	Joel Lundqvist	3-year	Entry-level	
June 14, 2006	Mike Green	1-year	Re-signing	
June 14, 2006	Niklas Hagman	2-year	Re-signing	
June 14, 2006	Jere Lehtinen	1-year	Option exercised	

== Draft picks ==
Dallas' picks at the 2005 NHL entry draft in Ottawa, Ontario.

Round	#	Player	Position	Nationality	College/Junior/Club team (League)
1	28	Matt Niskanen	(D)	United States	Virginia High School (USHS-MN)
2	33	James Neal	(LW)	Canada	Plymouth Whalers (OHL)
3	71	Richard Clune	(LW)	Canada	Sarnia Sting (OHL)
3	75	Perttu Lindgren	(C)	Finland	Ilves Jr. (Finland)
5	146	Tom Wandell	(C)	Sweden	Södertälje SK (Elitserien)
5	160	Matt Watkins	(RW)	Canada	Vernon Vipers (BCHL)
7	223	Pat McGann	(G)	United States	Illinois Midgets

== Farm teams ==
The Stars American Hockey League Affiliate for the 2005–06 season were the Iowa Stars, based in Des Moines, Iowa. They also became affiliated with the Idaho Steelheads of the ECHL.

== See also ==
- 2005–06 NHL season
