= 2005–06 Minnesota Wild season =

National Hockey League team season

2005–06 Minnesota Wild
- Division: 5th Northwest
- Conference: 11th Western
- 2005–06 record: 38–36–8
- Home record: 23–16–2
- Road record: 15–20–6
- Goals for: 231
- Goals against: 215

Team information
- General manager: Doug Risebrough
- Coach: Jacques Lemaire
- Captain: Rotating; Alex Henry (Oct.); Filip Kuba (Nov.); Willie Mitchell (Dec.–Jan.); Brian Rolston (Feb.); Wes Walz (Mar.–Apr.)
- Alternate captains: Marian Gaborik; Willie Mitchell (Oct.–Nov., Feb.-Mar.); Brian Rolston (Oct.–Jan., Mar.-Apr.); Wes Walz (Oct.–Feb.); Todd White
- Arena: Xcel Energy Center
- Average attendance: 18,575
- Minor league affiliate: Houston Aeros

Team leaders
- Goals: Marian Gaborik (38)
- Assists: Brian Rolston (45)
- Points: Brian Rolston (79)
- Penalty minutes: Derek Boogaard (158)
- Plus/minus: Willie Mitchell (+15)
- Wins: Manny Fernandez (30)
- Goals against average: Manny Fernandez (2.29)

The 2005–06 Minnesota Wild season was the team's sixth season in the National Hockey League (NHL). The Wild failed to qualify for the 2006 Stanley Cup playoffs.

== Regular season ==
The Wild allowed the fewest power-play goals in the NHL with 55 and had the highest penalty-kill percentage at 87.39%.

=== Final standings ===
Northwest Division
| No. | CR | | GP | W | L | OTL | GF | GA | Pts |
|---|---|---|---|---|---|---|---|---|---|
| 1 | 3 | **Calgary Flames** | 82 | 46 | 25 | 11 | 218 | 200 | 103 |
| 2 | 7 | **Colorado Avalanche** | 82 | 43 | 30 | 9 | 283 | 257 | 95 |
| 3 | 8 | **Edmonton Oilers** | 82 | 41 | 28 | 13 | 256 | 251 | 95 |
| 4 | 9 | Vancouver Canucks | 82 | 42 | 32 | 8 | 256 | 255 | 92 |
| 5 | 11 | Minnesota Wild | 82 | 38 | 36 | 8 | 231 | 215 | 84 |

Note: CR = Conference rank; GP = Games played; W = Wins; L = Losses; T = Ties; OTL = Overtime loss; GF = Goals for; GA = Goals against; Pts = Points
Bolded teams qualified for the playoffs.

Western Conference
| R | | Div | GP | W | L | OTL | GF | GA | Pts |
|---|---|---|---|---|---|---|---|---|---|
| **1** | **P-** Detroit Red Wings | **CE** | **82** | **58** | **16** | **8** | **305** | **209** | 124 |
| **2** | **Y-** Dallas Stars | **PA** | **82** | **53** | **23** | **6** | **265** | **218** | 112 |
| **3** | **Y-** Calgary Flames | **NW** | **82** | **46** | **25** | **11** | **218** | **200** | 103 |
| **4** | **X-** Nashville Predators | **CE** | **82** | **49** | **25** | **8** | **259** | **227** | 106 |
| **5** | **X-** San Jose Sharks | **PA** | **82** | **44** | **27** | **11** | **266** | **242** | 99 |
| **6** | **X-** Mighty Ducks of Anaheim | **PA** | **82** | **43** | **27** | **12** | **254** | **229** | 98 |
| **7** | **X-** Colorado Avalanche | **NW** | **82** | **43** | **30** | **9** | **283** | **257** | 95 |
| **8** | **X-** Edmonton Oilers | **NW** | **82** | **41** | **28** | **13** | **256** | **251** | 95 |
8.5
| 9 | Vancouver Canucks | NW | 82 | 42 | 32 | 8 | 256 | 255 | 92 |
| 10 | Los Angeles Kings | PA | 82 | 42 | 35 | 5 | 249 | 270 | 89 |
| 11 | Minnesota Wild | NW | 82 | 38 | 36 | 8 | 231 | 215 | 84 |
| 12 | Phoenix Coyotes | PA | 82 | 38 | 39 | 5 | 246 | 271 | 81 |
| 13 | Columbus Blue Jackets | CE | 82 | 35 | 43 | 4 | 223 | 279 | 74 |
| 14 | Chicago Blackhawks | CE | 82 | 26 | 43 | 13 | 211 | 285 | 65 |
| 15 | St. Louis Blues | CE | 82 | 21 | 46 | 15 | 197 | 292 | 57 |

Divisions: CE – Central, PA – Pacific, NW – Northwest

P – Clinched Presidents Trophy; Y – Clinched division; X – Clinched playoff spot

== Schedule and results ==
2005–06 regular season
October: 6–4–2 (home: 5–2–0; road: 1–2–2)

| Game | Date | Score | Opponent | Record | Recap |
|---|---|---|---|---|---|
| 1 | October 5, 2005 | 6–3 | Calgary Flames (2005–06) | 1–0–0 | W |
| 2 | October 8, 2005 | 1–2 | @ Phoenix Coyotes (2005–06) | 1–1–0 | L |
| 3 | October 9, 2005 | 1–2 OT | @ Los Angeles Kings (2005–06) | 1–1–1 | OTL |
| 4 | October 12, 2005 | 6–0 | Vancouver Canucks (2005–06) | 2–1–1 | W |
| 5 | October 14, 2005 | 3–5 | Vancouver Canucks (2005–06) | 2–2–1 | L |
| 6 | October 16, 2005 | 4–1 | Mighty Ducks of Anaheim (2005–06) | 3–2–1 | W |
| 7 | October 19, 2005 | 6–1 | San Jose Sharks (2005–06) | 4–2–1 | W |
| 8 | October 22, 2005 | 3–2 | @ St. Louis Blues (2005–06) | 5–2–1 | W |
| 9 | October 23, 2005 | 2–4 | @ Chicago Blackhawks (2005–06) | 5–3–1 | L |
| 10 | October 25, 2005 | 1–3 | Vancouver Canucks (2005–06) | 5–4–1 | L |
| 11 | October 28, 2005 | 1–2 SO | @ Columbus Blue Jackets (2005–06) | 5–4–2 | OTL |
| 12 | October 29, 2005 | 3–1 | Columbus Blue Jackets (2005–06) | 6–4–2 | W |

November: 4–6–1 (home: 2–2–1; road: 2–4–0)

| Game | Date | Score | Opponent | Record | Recap |
|---|---|---|---|---|---|
| 13 | November 1, 2005 | 0–3 | @ Calgary Flames (2005–06) | 6–5–2 | L |
| 14 | November 2, 2005 | 1–2 | @ Vancouver Canucks (2005–06) | 6–6–2 | L |
| 15 | November 5, 2005 | 3–1 | @ San Jose Sharks (2005–06) | 7–6–2 | W |
| 16 | November 6, 2005 | 4–3 SO | @ Mighty Ducks of Anaheim (2005–06) | 8–6–2 | W |
| 17 | November 8, 2005 | 2–4 | Phoenix Coyotes (2005–06) | 8–7–2 | L |
| 18 | November 11, 2005 | 1–3 | @ Detroit Red Wings (2005–06) | 8–8–2 | L |
| 19 | November 14, 2005 | 2–3 | @ Calgary Flames (2005–06) | 8–9–2 | L |
| 20 | November 19, 2005 | 4–2 | Nashville Predators (2005–06) | 9–9–2 | W |
| 21 | November 23, 2005 | 3–4 | Edmonton Oilers (2005–06) | 9–10–2 | L |
| 22 | November 25, 2005 | 5–3 | St. Louis Blues (2005–06) | 10–10–2 | W |
| 23 | November 30, 2005 | 2–3 SO | Columbus Blue Jackets (2005–06) | 10–10–3 | OTL |

December: 8–7–1 (home: 4–2–0; road: 4–5–1)

| Game | Date | Score | Opponent | Record | Recap |
|---|---|---|---|---|---|
| 24 | December 1, 2005 | 1–2 | @ Nashville Predators (2005–06) | 10–11–3 | L |
| 25 | December 3, 2005 | 2–3 SO | @ New Jersey Devils (2005–06) | 10–11–4 | OTL |
| 26 | December 5, 2005 | 1–3 | @ New York Rangers (2005–06) | 10–12–4 | L |
| 27 | December 8, 2005 | 5–0 | @ Pittsburgh Penguins (2005–06) | 11–12–4 | W |
| 28 | December 10, 2005 | 2–3 | @ Philadelphia Flyers (2005–06) | 11–13–4 | L |
| 29 | December 11, 2005 | 2–3 | Buffalo Sabres (2005–06) | 11–14–4 | L |
| 30 | December 13, 2005 | 4–3 | @ New York Islanders (2005–06) | 12–14–4 | W |
| 31 | December 15, 2005 | 2–3 | Boston Bruins (2005–06) | 12–15–4 | L |
| 32 | December 17, 2005 | 4–3 OT | Montreal Canadiens (2005–06) | 13–15–4 | W |
| 33 | December 19, 2005 | 2–1 | Dallas Stars (2005–06) | 14–15–4 | W |
| 34 | December 22, 2005 | 3–4 | @ Colorado Avalanche (2005–06) | 14–16–4 | L |
| 35 | December 23, 2005 | 5–3 | Colorado Avalanche (2005–06) | 15–16–4 | W |
| 36 | December 26, 2005 | 4–1 | @ Edmonton Oilers (2005–06) | 16–16–4 | W |
| 37 | December 28, 2005 | 4–2 | @ Edmonton Oilers (2005–06) | 17–16–4 | W |
| 38 | December 29, 2005 | 2–4 | @ Calgary Flames (2005–06) | 17–17–4 | L |
| 39 | December 31, 2005 | 4–3 | Vancouver Canucks (2005–06) | 18–17–4 | W |

January: 7–7–0 (home: 5–5–0; road: 2–2–0)

| Game | Date | Score | Opponent | Record | Recap |
|---|---|---|---|---|---|
| 40 | January 3, 2006 | 4–2 | @ Detroit Red Wings (2005–06) | 19–17–4 | W |
| 41 | January 5, 2006 | 2–4 | Colorado Avalanche (2005–06) | 19–18–4 | L |
| 42 | January 7, 2006 | 4–1 | Mighty Ducks of Anaheim (2005–06) | 20–18–4 | W |
| 43 | January 9, 2006 | 1–2 | Dallas Stars (2005–06) | 20–19–4 | L |
| 44 | January 14, 2006 | 1–4 | Calgary Flames (2005–06) | 20–20–4 | L |
| 45 | January 16, 2006 | 1–6 | Ottawa Senators (2005–06) | 20–21–4 | L |
| 46 | January 18, 2006 | 5–3 | Toronto Maple Leafs (2005–06) | 21–21–4 | W |
| 47 | January 20, 2006 | 4–1 | Chicago Blackhawks (2005–06) | 22–21–4 | W |
| 48 | January 22, 2006 | 3–2 | @ Chicago Blackhawks (2005–06) | 23–21–4 | W |
| 49 | January 24, 2006 | 3–2 | Phoenix Coyotes (2005–06) | 24–21–4 | W |
| 50 | January 26, 2006 | 5–1 | Nashville Predators (2005–06) | 25–21–4 | W |
| 51 | January 27, 2006 | 3–4 | @ Columbus Blue Jackets (2005–06) | 25–22–4 | L |
| 52 | January 30, 2006 | 4–5 | Detroit Red Wings (2005–06) | 25–23–4 | L |
| 53 | January 31, 2006 | 2–3 | @ Colorado Avalanche (2005–06) | 25–24–4 | L |

February: 4–2–1 (home: 1–1–0; road: 3–1–1)

| Game | Date | Score | Opponent | Record | Recap |
|---|---|---|---|---|---|
| 54 | February 2, 2006 | 3–2 SO | @ San Jose Sharks (2005–06) | 26–24–4 | W |
| 55 | February 4, 2006 | 6–4 | @ Phoenix Coyotes (2005–06) | 27–24–4 | W |
| 56 | February 7, 2006 | 5–1 | Los Angeles Kings (2005–06) | 28–24–4 | W |
| 57 | February 9, 2006 | 1–2 | Colorado Avalanche (2005–06) | 28–25–4 | L |
| 58 | February 10, 2006 | 6–3 | @ Edmonton Oilers (2005–06) | 29–25–4 | W |
| 59 | February 12, 2006 | 2–3 OT | @ Vancouver Canucks (2005–06) | 29–25–5 | OTL |
| 60 | February 28, 2006 | 2–4 | @ Colorado Avalanche (2005–06) | 29–26–5 | L |

March: 5–7–2 (home: 3–3–1; road: 2–4–1)

| Game | Date | Score | Opponent | Record | Recap |
|---|---|---|---|---|---|
| 61 | March 2, 2006 | 2–3 | @ Los Angeles Kings (2005–06) | 29–27–5 | L |
| 62 | March 3, 2006 | 2–4 | @ Mighty Ducks of Anaheim (2005–06) | 29–28–5 | L |
| 63 | March 5, 2006 | 5–3 | Colorado Avalanche (2005–06) | 30–28–5 | W |
| 64 | March 7, 2006 | 2–3 OT | Los Angeles Kings (2005–06) | 30–28–6 | OTL |
| 65 | March 10, 2006 | 1–2 OT | @ St. Louis Blues (2005–06) | 30–28–7 | OTL |
| 66 | March 12, 2006 | 4–3 | Edmonton Oilers (2005–06) | 31–28–7 | W |
| 67 | March 14, 2006 | 1–2 | Edmonton Oilers (2005–06) | 31–29–7 | L |
| 68 | March 19, 2006 | 2–3 | Calgary Flames (2005–06) | 31–30–7 | L |
| 69 | March 21, 2006 | 3–1 | Calgary Flames (2005–06) | 32–30–7 | W |
| 70 | March 22, 2006 | 2–4 | @ Dallas Stars (2005–06) | 32–31–7 | L |
| 71 | March 25, 2006 | 1–5 | San Jose Sharks (2005–06) | 32–32–7 | L |
| 72 | March 28, 2006 | 3–2 | @ Edmonton Oilers (2005–06) | 33–32–7 | W |
| 73 | March 29, 2006 | 1–2 | @ Vancouver Canucks (2005–06) | 33–33–7 | L |
| 74 | March 31, 2006 | 2–1 SO | @ Vancouver Canucks (2005–06) | 34–33–7 | W |

April: 4–3–1 (home: 3–1–0; road: 1–2–1)

| Game | Date | Score | Opponent | Record | Recap |
|---|---|---|---|---|---|
| 75 | April 2, 2006 | 2–3 | Detroit Red Wings (2005–06) | 34–34–7 | L |
| 76 | April 4, 2006 | 5–4 SO | St. Louis Blues (2005–06) | 35–34–7 | W |
| 77 | April 6, 2006 | 2–1 SO | Edmonton Oilers (2005–06) | 36–34–7 | W |
| 78 | April 7, 2006 | 1–2 | @ Calgary Flames (2005–06) | 36–35–7 | L |
| 79 | April 9, 2006 | 5–2 | @ Colorado Avalanche (2005–06) | 37–35–7 | W |
| 80 | April 11, 2006 | 2–0 | Chicago Blackhawks (2005–06) | 38–35–7 | W |
| 81 | April 13, 2006 | 2–4 | @ Nashville Predators (2005–06) | 38–36–7 | L |
| 82 | April 15, 2006 | 3–4 OT | @ Dallas Stars (2005–06) | 38–36–8 | OTL |

Legend: W Win (2 points) L Loss (0 points) OTL Overtime/shootout loss (1 point)

== Player statistics ==
=== Scoring ===
- Position abbreviations: C = Center; D = Defense; G = Goaltender; LW = Left wing; RW = Right wing
- † = Joined team via a transaction (e.g., trade, waivers, signing) during the season. Stats reflect time with the Wild only.
- ‡ = Left team via a transaction (e.g., trade, waivers, release) during the season. Stats reflect time with the Wild only.

| No. | Player | Pos | Regular season | | | | | |
| No. | Player | Pos | GP | G | A | Pts | +/- | PIM |
|---|---|---|---|---|---|---|---|---|
| 12 | Brian Rolston | C | 82 | 34 | 45 | 79 | 14 | 50 |
| 10 | Marian Gaborik | RW | 65 | 38 | 28 | 66 | 6 | 64 |
| 96 | Pierre-Marc Bouchard | C | 80 | 17 | 42 | 59 | 3 | 28 |
| 28 | Todd White | C | 61 | 19 | 21 | 40 | −1 | 18 |
| 25 | Randy Robitaille | C | 67 | 12 | 28 | 40 | −5 | 54 |
| 37 | Wes Walz | C | 82 | 19 | 18 | 37 | 7 | 61 |
| 32 | Marc Chouinard | C | 74 | 14 | 16 | 30 | 1 | 34 |
| 26 | Kurtis Foster | D | 58 | 10 | 18 | 28 | −3 | 60 |
| 9 | Alexandre Daigle | C | 46 | 5 | 23 | 28 | −6 | 12 |
| 11 | Pascal Dupuis | LW | 67 | 10 | 16 | 26 | −10 | 40 |
| 17 | Filip Kuba | D | 65 | 6 | 19 | 25 | 0 | 44 |
| 21 | Mikko Koivu | C | 64 | 6 | 15 | 21 | −9 | 40 |
| 20 | Andrei Zyuzin | D | 57 | 7 | 11 | 18 | −12 | 50 |
| 34 | Daniel Tjarnqvist | D | 60 | 3 | 15 | 18 | −11 | 32 |
| 19 | Stephane Veilleux | LW | 71 | 7 | 9 | 16 | −13 | 63 |
| 8 | Brent Burns | D | 72 | 4 | 12 | 16 | −7 | 32 |
| 55 | Nick Schultz | D | 79 | 2 | 12 | 14 | 2 | 43 |
| 27 | Kyle Wanvig | RW | 51 | 4 | 8 | 12 | −8 | 64 |
| 2 | Willie Mitchell‡ | D | 64 | 2 | 6 | 8 | 15 | 87 |
| 24 | Derek Boogaard | LW | 65 | 2 | 4 | 6 | 2 | 158 |
| 41 | Martin Skoula† | D | 17 | 1 | 5 | 6 | 0 | 10 |
| 83 | Matt Foy | RW | 19 | 2 | 3 | 5 | −4 | 16 |
| 18 | Mattias Weinhandl† | RW | 15 | 2 | 3 | 5 | 0 | 10 |
| 36 | Alex Henry | D | 63 | 0 | 5 | 5 | −4 | 73 |
| 35 | Manny Fernandez | G | 58 | 0 | 3 | 3 | | 6 |
| 7 | Erik Westrum | C | 10 | 0 | 1 | 1 | −1 | 2 |
| 23 | Scott Ferguson | D | 15 | 0 | 0 | 0 | −3 | 22 |
| 29 | Josh Harding | G | 3 | 0 | 0 | 0 | | 0 |
| 44 | Andrei Nazarov | LW | 2 | 0 | 0 | 0 | −1 | 6 |
| 56 | Erik Reitz | D | 5 | 0 | 0 | 0 | −2 | 4 |
| 30 | Dwayne Roloson‡ | G | 24 | 0 | 0 | 0 | | 6 |

=== Goaltending ===
- ‡ = Left team via a transaction (e.g., trade, waivers, release) during the season. Stats reflect time with the Wild only.

| No. | Player | Regular season | | | | | | | | | |
| No. | Player | GP | W | L | OT | SA | GA | GAA | SV% | SO | TOI |
|---|---|---|---|---|---|---|---|---|---|---|---|
| 35 | Manny Fernandez | 58 | 30 | 18 | 7 | 1612 | 130 | 2.29 | .919 | 1 | 3411 |
| 30 | Dwayne Roloson‡ | 24 | 6 | 17 | 1 | 759 | 68 | 3.00 | .910 | 1 | 1361 |
| 29 | Josh Harding | 3 | 2 | 1 | 0 | 83 | 8 | 2.59 | .904 | 1 | 185 |

== Awards and records ==
=== Awards ===
| Type | Award/honor | Recipient | Ref |
|---|---|---|---|
| League (in-season) | NHL Defensive Player of the Week | Manny Fernandez (January 2) | |
| Team | Three Star Award | Brian Rolston | |

=== Milestones ===
| Milestone | Player | Date | Ref |
|---|---|---|---|
| First game | Derek Boogaard | October 5, 2005 | |
| First game | Matt Foy | October 5, 2005 | |
| First game | Mikko Koivu | November 5, 2005 | |
| First game | Josh Harding | April 4, 2006 | |
| First game | Erik Reitz | April 7, 2006 | |

== Transactions ==
The Wild were involved in the following transactions from February 17, 2005, the day after the 2004–05 NHL season was officially cancelled, through June 19, 2006, the day of the deciding game of the 2006 Stanley Cup Finals.

=== Trades ===
| Date | Details | | Ref |
|---|---|---|---|
| July 30, 2005 | To Ottawa Senators: 4th-round pick in 2005 | To Minnesota Wild: Todd White | |
| August 26, 2005 | To Phoenix Coyotes: Zbynek Michalek | To Minnesota Wild: Erik Westrum; Dustin Wood | |
| March 8, 2006 | To Edmonton Oilers: Dwayne Roloson | To Minnesota Wild: 1st-round pick in 2006; Conditional 3rd-round pick in 2007 (Note: Minnesota would receive the pick if the Oilers re-signed Roloson, which they did on July 1, 2006.) | |
| March 9, 2006 | To Dallas Stars: Willie Mitchell; 2nd-round pick in 2007 | To Minnesota Wild: Shawn Belle; Martin Skoula | |
| June 14, 2006 | To Atlanta Thrashers: Conditional 3rd-round pick in 2006 or 2007 | To Minnesota Wild: Rights to Petteri Nummelin | |

=== Players acquired ===
| Date | Player | Former team | Term | Via | Ref |
|---|---|---|---|---|---|
| August 1, 2005 | Andrei Nazarov | Phoenix Coyotes | | Free agency | |
| August 4, 2005 | Scott Ferguson | Skovde IK (Allsvenskan) | | Free agency | |
| August 4, 2005 | Kurtis Foster | Anaheim Mighty Ducks | | Free agency | |
| August 15, 2005 | Daniel Tjarnqvist | Atlanta Thrashers | 1-year | Free agency | |
| August 16, 2005 | Joey Tetarenko | Houston Aeros (AHL) | 1-year | Free agency | |
| October 4, 2005 | Randy Robitaille | Nashville Predators | | Waivers | |
| March 4, 2006 | Mattias Weinhandl | New York Islanders | | Waivers | |
| June 1, 2006 | Niklas Backstrom | Oulun Karpat (Liiga) | multi-year | Free agency | |
| June 6, 2006 | Peter Ratchuk | Adler Mannheim (DEL) | 1-year | Free agency | |

=== Players lost ===
| Date | Player | New team | Via (Note: In parentheses is the player's free agency group on August 1 if applicable.) | Ref |
|---|---|---|---|---|
| April 12, 2005 | Christoph Brandner | Sodertalje SK (SHL) | Free agency (UFA) | |
| July 29, 2005 | Matt Johnson (Note: Johnson retired.) | | Compliance buyout | |
| August 1, 2005 | Jason Beckett (Note: Beckett was inactive during the 2005–06 season.) | | Contract expiration (UFA) | |
| August 1, 2005 | Kyle Kettles (Note: Kettles retired.) | | Contract expiration (UFA) | |
| August 4, 2005 | Mark Cullen | Chicago Blackhawks | Free agency (UFA) | |
| August 6, 2005 | Andrew Brunette | Colorado Avalanche | Free agency (III) | |
| August 9, 2005 | Richard Park | Vancouver Canucks | Free agency (UFA) | |
| September 4, 2005 | Raymond Giroux | Ak Bars Kazan (RSL) | Free agency (VI) | |
| September 14, 2005 | Jordan Krestanovich | Mora IK (SHL) | Free agency (UFA) | |
| N/A | Marc Cavosie | Philadelphia Phantoms (AHL) | Free agency (UFA) | |
| October 19, 2005 | Dan Cavanaugh | Philadelphia Phantoms (AHL) | Free agency (VI) | |
| May 11, 2006 | Kirby Law | Geneve-Servette HC (NLA) | Free agency | |
| May 13, 2006 | Alexandre Daigle | HC Davos (NLA) | Free agency | |

=== Signings ===
| Date | Player | Term | Contract type | Ref |
|---|---|---|---|---|
| July 28, 2005 | Patrick O'Sullivan | 3-year | Entry-level | |
| July 29, 2005 | Alexandre Daigle | 1-year | Re-signing | |
| August 2, 2005 | Roman Voloshenko | 3-year | Entry-level | |
| August 3, 2005 | Marc Chouinard | 1-year | Re-signing | |
| August 3, 2005 | Manny Fernandez | 1-year | Re-signing | |
| August 8, 2005 | Miroslav Kopriva | | Entry-level | |
| August 9, 2005 | Pierre-Marc Bouchard | 1-year | Re-signing | |
| August 9, 2005 | Willie Mitchell | 1-year | Re-signing | |
| August 9, 2005 | Todd White | multi-year | Re-signing | |
| August 10, 2005 | Andrei Zyuzin | 1-year | Re-signing | |
| August 16, 2005 | Kyle Wanvig | 1-year | Re-signing | |
| August 19, 2005 | Rickard Wallin | 1-year | Re-signing | |
| August 24, 2005 | Peter Olvecky | | Entry-level | |
| September 9, 2005 | Clayton Stoner | | Entry-level | |
| September 9, 2005 | Stephane Veilleux | multi-year | Re-signing | |
| September 28, 2005 | Erik Reitz | | Re-signing | |
| March 3, 2006 | Manny Fernandez | multi-year | Extension | |
| April 5, 2006 | Danny Irmen | multi-year | Entry-level | |
| May 1, 2006 | Benoit Pouliot | multi-year | Entry-level | |
| June 14, 2006 | Petteri Nummelin | multi-year | Re-signing | |
| June 19, 2006 | Brian Rolston | 1-year | Extension (Note: Contract option for the 2007–08 season was exercised by Minnesota.) | |

== Draft picks ==
Minnesota's picks at the 2005 NHL entry draft in Ottawa, Ontario.

| Round | # | Player | Pos | Nationality | College/Junior/Club team (League) |
|---|---|---|---|---|---|
| 1 | 4 | Benoit Pouliot | LW | Canada | Sudbury Wolves (OHL) |
| 2 | 57 | Matt Kassian | LW | Canada | Kamloops Blazers (WHL) |
| 3 | 65 | Kristofer Westblom | G | Canada | Kelowna Rockets (WHL) |
| 4 | 110 | Kyle Bailey | C | Canada | Portland Winterhawks (WHL) |
| 4 | 122 | Morten Madsen | LW | Denmark | Frölunda HC Jr. (Sweden) |
| 5 | 129 | Anthony Aiello | D | United States | Thayer Academy (USHS-MA) |
| 7 | 199 | Riley Emmerson | RW | Canada | Tri-City Americans (WHL) |

== See also ==
- 2005–06 NHL season
