= 2005–06 San Jose Sharks season =

National Hockey League team season

2005–06 San Jose Sharks
- Division: 2nd Pacific
- Conference: 5th Western
- 2005–06 record: 44–27–11
- Home record: 25–9–7
- Road record: 19–18–4
- Goals for: 266
- Goals against: 242

Team information
- General manager: Doug Wilson
- Coach: Ron Wilson
- Captain: Patrick Marleau
- Alternate captains: Alyn McCauley; Rotating
- Arena: HP Pavilion
- Average attendance: 16,831
- Minor league affiliates: Cleveland Barons; Fresno Falcons; Toledo Storm

Team leaders
- Goals: Jonathan Cheechoo (56)
- Assists: Joe Thornton (72)
- Points: Jonathan Cheechoo (93)
- Penalty minutes: Mark Smith (97)
- Plus/minus: Joe Thornton (+31)
- Wins: Vesa Toskala (23)
- Goals against average: Vesa Toskala (2.56)

The 2005–06 San Jose Sharks season was the Sharks' 15th season in the National Hockey League (NHL).

== Regular season ==
On November 30, 2005, the Boston Bruins traded Joe Thornton - who was the team's leading scorer at the time by a substantial margin - to the San Jose Sharks in a four-player deal which sent Marco Sturm, Wayne Primeau and Brad Stuart to Boston.

=== Final standings ===
Pacific Division
No.	CR		GP	W	L	OTL	GF	GA	Pts
1	2	Dallas Stars	82	53	23	6	265	218	112
2	5	San Jose Sharks	82	44	27	11	266	242	99
3	6	Mighty Ducks of Anaheim	82	43	27	12	254	229	98
4	10	Los Angeles Kings	82	42	35	5	249	270	89
5	12	Phoenix Coyotes	82	38	39	5	246	271	81

Western Conference
R		Div	GP	W	L	OTL	GF	GA	Pts
1	P- Detroit Red Wings	CE	82	58	16	8	305	209	124
2	Y- Dallas Stars	PA	82	53	23	6	265	218	112
3	Y- Calgary Flames	NW	82	46	25	11	218	200	103
4	X- Nashville Predators	CE	82	49	25	8	259	227	106
5	X- San Jose Sharks	PA	82	44	27	11	266	242	99
6	X- Mighty Ducks of Anaheim	PA	82	43	27	12	254	229	98
7	X- Colorado Avalanche	NW	82	43	30	9	283	257	95
8	X- Edmonton Oilers	NW	82	41	28	13	256	251	95
8.5
9	Vancouver Canucks	NW	82	42	32	8	256	255	92
8	Los Angeles Kings	PA	82	42	35	5	249	270	89
11	Minnesota Wild	NW	82	38	36	8	231	215	84
12	Phoenix Coyotes	PA	82	38	39	5	246	271	81
13	Columbus Blue Jackets	CE	82	35	43	4	223	279	74
14	Chicago Blackhawks	CE	82	26	43	13	211	285	65
15	St. Louis Blues	CE	82	21	46	15	197	292	57

Divisions: CE – Central, PA – Pacific, NW – Northwest

P – Clinched Presidents Trophy; Y – Clinched division; X – Clinched playoff spot

== Playoffs ==
In the first round of the 2006 NHL Western Conference playoffs, the fifth-seeded Sharks defeated the fourth-seeded Nashville Predators in five games. The two teams split the first two games in Nashville's Gaylord Entertainment Center, but when the series shifted to San Jose's HP Pavilion, the Sharks took both games and a stranglehold on the series. The Sharks then finished off the Predators when the series moved back to Nashville, taking Game 5, 2–1.

The Sharks then moved on to the second round, facing the eighth-seeded Edmonton Oilers, who had upset the heavily favored, top-seeded Detroit Red Wings. The Sharks took the first two games in San Jose by identical 2–1 scores, but when the series shifted to Rexall Place in Edmonton, the Oilers never lost again in the series, taking two in Edmonton, one in San Jose and another back in Edmonton to complete the 4–2 series victory, setting up a Western Conference Final match-up against the Mighty Ducks of Anaheim.

== Schedule and results ==
=== Regular season ===
2005–06 regular season
October: 6–5–1 (home: 3–0–0; road: 3–5–1)

Game	Date	Score	Opponent	Record	Recap
1	October 5, 2005	2–3	@ Nashville Predators (2005–06)	0–1–0	L
2	October 7, 2005	3–6	@ Chicago Blackhawks (2005–06)	0–2–0	L
3	October 8, 2005	7–6	@ St. Louis Blues (2005–06)	1–2–0	W
4	October 12, 2005	4–1	Columbus Blue Jackets (2005–06)	2–2–0	W
5	October 15, 2005	4–3	Chicago Blackhawks (2005–06)	3–2–0	W
6	October 17, 2005	2–3 OT	@ Detroit Red Wings (2005–06)	3–2–1	OTL
7	October 19, 2005	1–6	@ Minnesota Wild (2005–06)	3–3–1	L
8	October 21, 2005	1–4	@ Columbus Blue Jackets (2005–06)	3–4–1	L
9	October 22, 2005	1–2	@ Nashville Predators (2005–06)	3–5–1	L
10	October 26, 2005	5–4 OT	@ Dallas Stars (2005–06)	4–5–1	W
11	October 28, 2005	5–4	@ Los Angeles Kings (2005–06)	5–5–1	W
12	October 29, 2005	3–2 SO	Calgary Flames (2005–06)	6–5–1	W

November: 2–7–3 (home: 1–3–2; road: 1–4–1)

Game	Date	Score	Opponent	Record	Recap
13	November 2, 2005	3–2 OT	Nashville Predators (2005–06)	7–5–1	W
14	November 4, 2005	1–0 OT	@ Mighty Ducks of Anaheim (2005–06)	8–5–1	W
15	November 5, 2005	1–3	Minnesota Wild (2005–06)	8–6–1	L
16	November 8, 2005	2–5	@ Colorado Avalanche (2005–06)	8–7–1	L
17	November 12, 2005	2–3 SO	Dallas Stars (2005–06)	8–7–2	OTL
18	November 16, 2005	1–3	Vancouver Canucks (2005–06)	8–8–2	L
19	November 19, 2005	3–4 SO	Phoenix Coyotes (2005–06)	8–8–3	OTL
20	November 21, 2005	1–2 SO	@ Edmonton Oilers (2005–06)	8–8–4	OTL
21	November 23, 2005	2–3	@ Calgary Flames (2005–06)	8–9–4	L
22	November 24, 2005	2–3	@ Vancouver Canucks (2005–06)	8–10–4	L
23	November 26, 2005	6–7	Detroit Red Wings (2005–06)	8–11–4	L
24	November 30, 2005	1–4	@ Dallas Stars (2005–06)	8–12–4	L

December: 8–4–1 (home: 6–1–1; road: 2–3–0)

Game	Date	Score	Opponent	Record	Recap
25	December 2, 2005	5–0	@ Buffalo Sabres (2005–06)	9–12–4	W
26	December 3, 2005	5–4	@ Toronto Maple Leafs (2005–06)	10–12–4	W
27	December 6, 2005	5–3	Atlanta Thrashers (2005–06)	11–12–4	W
28	December 8, 2005	6–2	Florida Panthers (2005–06)	12–12–4	W
29	December 10, 2005	4–3	Carolina Hurricanes (2005–06)	13–12–4	W
30	December 16, 2005	4–1	Washington Capitals (2005–06)	14–12–4	W
31	December 18, 2005	4–5	@ Mighty Ducks of Anaheim (2005–06)	14–13–4	L
32	December 20, 2005	4–2	Mighty Ducks of Anaheim (2005–06)	15–13–4	W
33	December 22, 2005	1–2	@ Phoenix Coyotes (2005–06)	15–14–4	L
34	December 23, 2005	1–2 SO	St. Louis Blues (2005–06)	15–14–5	OTL
35	December 26, 2005	3–4	@ Los Angeles Kings (2005–06)	15–15–5	L
36	December 28, 2005	4–5	Phoenix Coyotes (2005–06)	15–16–5	L
37	December 30, 2005	5–2	Colorado Avalanche (2005–06)	16–16–5	W

January: 7–3–2 (home: 4–1–1; road: 3–2–1)

Game	Date	Score	Opponent	Record	Recap
38	January 5, 2006	6–3	Columbus Blue Jackets (2005–06)	17–16–5	W
39	January 7, 2006	3–2	Los Angeles Kings (2005–06)	18–16–5	W
40	January 10, 2006	6–2	@ Boston Bruins (2005–06)	19–16–5	W
41	January 12, 2006	2–0	@ Ottawa Senators (2005–06)	20–16–5	W
42	January 14, 2006	2–6	@ Montreal Canadiens (2005–06)	20–17–5	L
43	January 16, 2006	3–1	Tampa Bay Lightning (2005–06)	21–17–5	W
44	January 19, 2006	2–3 SO	Edmonton Oilers (2005–06)	21–17–6	OTL
45	January 21, 2006	4–3 OT	@ Los Angeles Kings (2005–06)	22–17–6	W
46	January 24, 2006	4–1	Los Angeles Kings (2005–06)	23–17–6	W
47	January 26, 2006	0–2	Mighty Ducks of Anaheim (2005–06)	23–18–6	L
48	January 28, 2006	2–6	@ Phoenix Coyotes (2005–06)	23–19–6	L
49	January 30, 2006	2–3 OT	@ Dallas Stars (2005–06)	23–19–7	OTL

February: 5–2–1 (home: 3–2–1; road: 2–0–0)

Game	Date	Score	Opponent	Record	Recap
50	February 1, 2006	6–4	@ Mighty Ducks of Anaheim (2005–06)	24–19–7	W
51	February 2, 2006	2–3 SO	Minnesota Wild (2005–06)	24–19–8	OTL
52	February 4, 2006	0–2	Mighty Ducks of Anaheim (2005–06)	24–20–8	L
53	February 6, 2006	3–4	Calgary Flames (2005–06)	24–21–8	L
54	February 8, 2006	2–1	Chicago Blackhawks (2005–06)	25–21–8	W
55	February 10, 2006	6–3	Dallas Stars (2005–06)	26–21–8	W
56	February 12, 2006	5–4 OT	@ Phoenix Coyotes (2005–06)	27–21–8	W
57	February 28, 2006	5–1	Detroit Red Wings (2005–06)	28–21–8	W

March: 8–5–2 (home: 5–1–1; road: 3–4–1)

Game	Date	Score	Opponent	Record	Recap
58	March 3, 2006	2–3	@ Edmonton Oilers (2005–06)	28–22–8	L
59	March 4, 2006	0–2	@ Calgary Flames (2005–06)	28–23–8	L
60	March 7, 2006	4–5 OT	@ Mighty Ducks of Anaheim (2005–06)	28–23–9	OTL
61	March 9, 2006	5–2	Edmonton Oilers (2005–06)	29–23–9	W
62	March 11, 2006	3–2 OT	Nashville Predators (2005–06)	30–23–9	W
63	March 13, 2006	4–3	Los Angeles Kings (2005–06)	31–23–9	W
64	March 16, 2006	5–2	St. Louis Blues (2005–06)	32–23–9	W
65	March 18, 2006	3–4 SO	Dallas Stars (2005–06)	32–23–10	OTL
66	March 19, 2006	6–5	Colorado Avalanche (2005–06)	33–23–10	W
67	March 21, 2006	6–0	@ St. Louis Blues (2005–06)	34–23–10	W
68	March 23, 2006	0–4	@ Detroit Red Wings (2005–06)	34–24–10	L
69	March 25, 2006	5–1	@ Minnesota Wild (2005–06)	35–24–10	W
70	March 26, 2006	5–4 OT	@ Chicago Blackhawks (2005–06)	36–24–10	W
71	March 28, 2006	1–4	@ Columbus Blue Jackets (2005–06)	36–25–10	L
72	March 30, 2006	2–5	Phoenix Coyotes (2005–06)	36–26–10	L

April: 8–1–1 (home: 3–1–1; road: 5–0–0)

Game	Date	Score	Opponent	Record	Recap
73	April 1, 2006	3–4 OT	Phoenix Coyotes (2005–06)	36–26–11	OTL
74	April 3, 2006	3–2 OT	@ Dallas Stars (2005–06)	37–26–11	W
75	April 5, 2006	2–1	@ Colorado Avalanche (2005–06)	38–26–11	W
76	April 6, 2006	5–0	@ Los Angeles Kings (2005–06)	39–26–11	W
77	April 9, 2006	4–1	Dallas Stars (2005–06)	40–26–11	W
78	April 10, 2006	3–2	@ Phoenix Coyotes (2005–06)	41–26–11	W
79	April 12, 2006	5–4 OT	@ Vancouver Canucks (2005–06)	42–26–11	W
80	April 13, 2006	5–3	Vancouver Canucks (2005–06)	43–26–11	W
81	April 15, 2006	6–3	Mighty Ducks of Anaheim (2005–06)	44–26–11	W
82	April 17, 2006	0–4	Los Angeles Kings (2005–06)	44–27–11	L

Legend: W Win (2 points) L Loss (0 points) OTL Overtime/shootout loss (1 point)

=== Playoffs ===
2006 Stanley Cup playoffs
Western Conference Quarterfinals vs. (4) Nashville Predators – Sharks win 4–1

Game	Date	Score	Opponent	Series	Recap
1	April 21, 2006	3–4	@ Nashville Predators	Predators lead 1–0	L
2	April 23, 2006	3–0	@ Nashville Predators	Series tied 1–1	W
3	April 25, 2006	4–1	Nashville Predators	Sharks lead 2–1	W
4	April 27, 2006	5–4	Nashville Predators	Sharks lead 3–1	W
5	April 30, 2006	2–1	@ Nashville Predators	Sharks win 4–1	W

Western Conference Semifinals vs. (8) Edmonton Oilers – Oilers win 4–2

Game	Date	Score	Opponent	Series	Recap
1	May 7, 2006	2–1	Edmonton Oilers	Sharks lead 1–0	W
2	May 8, 2006	2–1	Edmonton Oilers	Sharks lead 2–0	W
3	May 10, 2006	2–3 3OT	@ Edmonton Oilers	Sharks lead 2–1	L
4	May 12, 2006	3–6	@ Edmonton Oilers	Series tied 2–2	L
5	May 14, 2006	3–6	Edmonton Oilers	Oilers lead 3–2	L
6	May 17, 2006	0–2	@ Edmonton Oilers	Oilers win 4–2	L

Legend: W Win L Loss

== Player statistics ==
=== Scoring ===
- Position abbreviations: C = Center; D = Defense; G = Goaltender; LW = Left wing; RW = Right wing
- † = Joined team via a transaction (e.g., trade, waivers, signing) during the season. Stats reflect time with the Sharks only.
- ‡ = Left team via a transaction (e.g., trade, waivers, release) during the season. Stats reflect time with the Sharks only.

No.	Player	Pos	Regular season						Playoffs					
No.	Player	Pos	GP	G	A	Pts	+/-	PIM	GP	G	A	Pts	+/-	PIM
14	Jonathan Cheechoo	RW	82	56	37	93	23	58	11	4	5	9	−1	8
19	Joe Thornton†	C	58	20	72	92	31	55	11	2	7	9	−4	12
12	Patrick Marleau	C	82	34	52	86	−12	26	11	9	5	14	2	8
28	Nils Ekman	LW	77	21	36	57	20	54	11	2	2	4	−2	8
42	Tom Preissing	D	74	11	32	43	17	26	11	1	6	7	0	4
9	Milan Michalek	RW	81	17	18	35	1	45	9	1	4	5	4	8
26 (Note: Bernier wore number 46 in his first two games.)	Steve Bernier	RW	39	14	13	27	4	35	11	1	5	6	4	8
10	Alyn McCauley	C	76	12	14	26	−3	30	6	0	1	1	0	4
16	Mark Smith	C	80	9	15	24	3	97	11	3	0	3	2	6
22	Scott Hannan	D	81	6	18	24	7	58	11	0	1	1	0	6
44	Christian Ehrhoff	D	64	5	18	23	10	32	11	2	6	8	2	18
4	Kyle McLaren	D	77	2	21	23	6	66	11	0	3	3	2	4
37 (Note: Stevenson wore number 55 in his first six games.)	Grant Stevenson	C	47	10	12	22	−7	14	5	0	0	0	−1	4
11	Marcel Goc	C	81	8	14	22	−7	22	11	0	3	3	0	0
17	Scott Thornton	LW	71	10	11	21	−8	84	11	2	0	2	−1	6
19	Marco Sturm‡	LW	23	6	10	16	−8	16	—	—	—	—	—	—
23	Niko Dimitrakos‡	RW	45	4	12	16	0	26	—	—	—	—	—	—
7	Brad Stuart‡	D	23	2	10	12	−2	14	—	—	—	—	—	—
24	Josh Langfeld‡	RW	39	2	9	11	4	16	—	—	—	—	—	—
15	Wayne Primeau‡	C	21	5	3	8	−6	17	—	—	—	—	—	—
15	Ville Nieminen†	LW	22	3	4	7	−3	10	11	0	2	2	−1	24
25	Matt Carle†	D	12	3	3	6	−2	14	11	0	3	3	1	4
34	Patrick Rissmiller	LW	18	3	3	6	1	8	11	2	1	3	1	6
5	Rob Davison	D	69	1	5	6	6	76	1	0	0	0	0	0
6	Josh Gorges	D	49	0	6	6	5	31	11	0	1	1	−1	4
29	Ryane Clowe	RW	18	0	2	2	−2	9	1	0	0	0	−1	0
21	Jim Fahey	D	21	0	2	2	−11	14	—	—	—	—	—	—
27	Scott Parker	RW	10	1	0	1	3	38	—	—	—	—	—	—
43	Matt Carkner	D	1	0	1	1	0	2	—	—	—	—	—	—
41	Douglas Murray	D	34	0	1	1	3	27	—	—	—	—	—	—
20	Evgeni Nabokov	G	45	0	1	1		18	1	0	0	0		0
35	Vesa Toskala	G	37	0	1	1		4	11	0	0	0		0
31	Nolan Schaefer	G	7	0	0	0		2	—	—	—	—	—	—

=== Goaltending ===
No.	Player	Regular season										Playoffs								
No.	Player	GP	W	L	OT	SA	GA	GAA	SV%	SO	TOI	GP	W	L	SA	GA	GAA	SV%	SO	TOI
35	Vesa Toskala	37	23	7	4	878	87	2.56	.901	2	2039	11	6	5	311	28	2.45	.910	1	686
20	Evgeni Nabokov	45	16	19	7	1160	133	3.10	.885	1	2575	1	0	0	4	1	5.00	.750	0	12
31	Nolan Schaefer	7	5	1	0	138	11	1.88	.920	1	352	–	–	–	–	–	–	–	–	–

== Awards and records ==
=== Awards ===
Type	Award/honor	Recipient	Ref
League (annual)	Art Ross Trophy	Joe Thornton	
League (annual)	Hart Memorial Trophy	Joe Thornton	
League (annual)	Maurice "Rocket" Richard Trophy	Jonathan Cheechoo	
League (annual)	NHL First All-Star Team	Joe Thornton (Center)	
League (in-season)	NHL Defensive Player of the Week	Vesa Toskala (March 27)	
League (in-season)	NHL Defensive Player of the Week	Vesa Toskala (April 10)	
League (in-season)	NHL Offensive Player of the Week	Patrick Marleau (December 5)	
League (in-season)	NHL Offensive Player of the Week	Joe Thornton (December 12)	
League (in-season)	NHL Offensive Player of the Week	Patrick Marleau (February 13)	
League (in-season)	NHL Offensive Player of the Week	Jonathan Cheechoo & Joe Thornton (April 17)	
Team	Sharks Player of the Year	Joe Thornton	
Team	Sharks Rookie of the Year	Milan Michalek	
Team	Three Stars of the Year	Jonathan Cheechoo	

=== Milestones ===
Milestone	Player	Date	Ref
First game	Ryane Clowe	October 5, 2005	
First game	Josh Gorges	October 7, 2005	
First game	Nolan Schaefer	October 26, 2005	
First game	Steve Bernier	November 4, 2005	
First game	Grant Stevenson	November 23, 2005	
First game	Douglas Murray	December 2, 2005	
First game	Matt Carkner	February 6, 2006	
First game	Matt Carle	March 25, 2006	

== Transactions ==
The Sharks were involved in the following transactions from February 17, 2005, the day after the 2004–05 NHL season was officially cancelled, through June 19, 2006, the day of the deciding game of the 2006 Stanley Cup Finals.

=== Trades ===
Date	Details		Ref
July 30, 2005	To Atlanta Thrashers: 1st-round pick in 2005; 2nd-round pick in 2005; 7th-round pick in 2005	To San Jose Sharks: 1st-round pick in 2005	
July 30, 2005	To Tampa Bay Lightning: 3rd-round pick in 2005	To San Jose Sharks: 5th-round pick in 2005; 4th-round pick in 2006	
July 30, 2005	To Anaheim Mighty Ducks: 5th-round pick in 2005	To San Jose Sharks: 6th-round pick in 2005; 7th-round pick in 2006	
November 30, 2005	To Boston Bruins: Wayne Primeau; Brad Stuart; Marco Sturm	To San Jose Sharks: Joe Thornton	
March 8, 2006	To New York Rangers: 3rd-round pick in 2006	To San Jose Sharks: Ville Nieminen	
March 9, 2006	To Philadelphia Flyers: Niko Dimitrakos	To San Jose Sharks: 3rd-round pick in 2006	
June 1, 2006	To Colorado Avalanche: Rights to Michael Vernace	To San Jose Sharks: 6th-round pick in 2006 or 2007 (Note: It was San Jose’s choice between the two picks. They chose the 2007 pick.)	

=== Players acquired ===
Date	Player	Former team	Term	Via	Ref
September 12, 2005	Josh Langfeld	Ottawa Senators	1-year	Free agency	
September 19, 2005	Brad Staubitz	Ottawa 67's (OHL)	3-year	Free agency	
January 16, 2006	Mike Iggulden	Cleveland Barons (AHL)	2-year	Free agency	

=== Players lost ===
Date	Player	New team	Via (Note: In parentheses is the player's free agency group on August 1 if applicable.)	Ref
June 2, 2005	David Cloutier	HC TWK Innsbruck (EBEL)	Free agency (UFA)	
August 2, 2005	Mike Rathje	Philadelphia Flyers	Free agency (III)	
August 8, 2005	Miroslav Zalesak	Washington Capitals	Free agency (VI)	
August 25, 2005	Alexander Korolyuk	HC Vityaz (RSL)	Free agency (II) (Note: San Jose retained Korolyuk’s NHL rights until trading them to the New Jersey Devils on October 1, 2006.)	
September 7, 2005	Aaron Gill	Trenton Titans (ECHL)	Free agency (UFA)	
October 19, 2005	Scott Ford	Trenton Titans (ECHL)	Free agency (UFA)	
January 31, 2006	Josh Langfeld	Boston Bruins	Waivers	

=== Signings ===
Date	Player	Term	Contract type	Ref
July 28, 2005	Steve Bernier	3-year	Entry-level	
July 28, 2005	Patrick Ehelechner	3-year	Entry-level	
July 28, 2005	Josh Hennessy	3-year	Entry-level	
August 8, 2005	Rob Davison	1-year	Re-signing	
August 8, 2005	Jim Fahey	1-year	Re-signing	
August 9, 2005	Nils Ekman	2-year	Re-signing	
August 10, 2005	Tom Preissing	2-year	Re-signing	
August 10, 2005	Wayne Primeau	2-year	Re-signing	
August 11, 2005	Niko Dimitrakos	2-year	Re-signing	
August 11, 2005	Kyle McLaren	3-year	Extension	
August 15, 2005	Matt Carkner	1-year	Re-signing	
August 15, 2005	Patrick Marleau	3-year	Re-signing	
August 15, 2005	Douglas Murray		Re-signing	
August 15, 2005	Scott Parker	1-year	Re-signing	
August 15, 2005	Josh Prudden	1-year	Re-signing	
August 15, 2005	Nolan Schaefer	1-year	Re-signing	
August 15, 2005	Garrett Stafford	1-year	Re-signing	
August 15, 2005	Brad Stuart	2-year	Re-signing	
August 15, 2005	Marco Sturm	2-year	Re-signing	
August 24, 2005	Tom Cavanagh		Entry-level	
August 30, 2005	Alexander Korolyuk	1-year	Arbitration decision	
September 6, 2005	Ryane Clowe	3-year	Re-signing	
September 6, 2005	Patrick Rissmiller	1-year	Re-signing	
September 6, 2005	Jonathan Tremblay	3-year	Entry-level	
September 19, 2005	Lukas Kaspar	3-year	Entry-level	
February 7, 2006	Jonathan Cheechoo	5-year	Extension	
February 7, 2006	Evgeni Nabokov	4-year	Extension	
February 27, 2006	Vesa Toskala	2-year	Extension	
March 19, 2006	Matt Carle		Entry-level	
April 8, 2006	Devin Setoguchi		Entry-level	
April 8, 2006	Dan Spang		Entry-level	
June 2, 2006	Thomas Greiss		Entry-level	
June 2, 2006	Michal Macho		Entry-level	
June 2, 2006	Marc-Edouard Vlasic		Entry-level	

== Draft picks ==
San Jose's draft picks at the 2005 NHL entry draft held at the Westin Hotel in Ottawa, Ontario.

Round	#	Player	Nationality	College/Junior/Club team (League)
1	8	Devin Setoguchi	Canada	Saskatoon Blades (WHL)
2	35	Marc-Edouard Vlasic	Canada	Quebec Remparts (QMJHL)
4	112	Alex Stalock	United States	Cedar Rapids RoughRiders (USHL)
5	140	Taylor Dakers	Canada	Kootenay Ice (WHL)
5	149	Derek Joslin	Canada	Ottawa 67's (OHL)
5	162	P. J. Fenton	United States	University of Massachusetts Amherst (Hockey East)
6	183	Will Colbert	Canada	Ottawa 67's (OHL)
6	193	Tony Lucia	United States	Wayzata High School (USHS-MN)

== See also ==
- 2005–06 NHL season
