= 2005–06 Nashville Predators season =

Professional ice hockey team season

2005–06 Nashville Predators
- Division: 2nd Central
- Conference: 4th Western
- 2005–06 record: 49–25–8
- Home record: 32–8–1
- Road record: 17–17–7
- Goals for: 259
- Goals against: 227

Team information
- General manager: David Poile
- Coach: Barry Trotz
- Captain: Greg Johnson
- Alternate captains: Kimmo Timonen; Scott Walker
- Arena: Gaylord Entertainment Center
- Average attendance: 14,428
- Minor league affiliate: Milwaukee Admirals

Team leaders
- Goals: Paul Kariya; Steve Sullivan (31)
- Assists: Paul Kariya (54)
- Points: Paul Kariya (85)
- Penalty minutes: Darcy Hordichuk (163)
- Plus/minus: Scottie Upshall (+14)
- Wins: Tomas Vokoun (36)
- Goals against average: Chris Mason (2.54)

The 2005–06 Nashville Predators season was the eighth season of the Nashville Predators in the National Hockey League (NHL). The Predators qualified for the Stanley Cup playoffs for the second consecutive season.

== Regular season ==
The Predators were the last team to record their first regulation loss of the regular season. They opened the season with an 8–0–1 stretch before losing at home to the Edmonton Oilers on October 29, 2005, 5–1.

- On March 9, 2006, David Legwand tied the record for the fastest regular season overtime goal scored (set on December 30, 1995, by Mats Sundin) when he scored just six seconds into the overtime period to give the Predators a 3–2 road win over the Vancouver Canucks.
- Starting goaltender Tomas Vokoun missed the final eight regular season games and the playoffs due to a blood condition.
- On April 15, 2006, Chris Mason was credited for a goal when Phoenix Coyotes forward Geoff Sanderson shot the puck into his own net. Mason became the ninth NHL goaltender to score a goal and joined Damian Rhodes as the only goaltenders to be credited with a goal in both the American Hockey League and NHL. In response, Mason said, "It was a cheesy goal. Someone else should have received it."

=== Final standings ===
Central Division
No.	CR		GP	W	L	OTL	GF	GA	Pts
1	1	**Detroit Red Wings**	82	58	16	8	305	209	124
2	4	**Nashville Predators**	82	49	25	8	259	227	106
3	13	Columbus Blue Jackets	82	35	43	4	223	279	74
4	14	Chicago Blackhawks	82	26	43	13	211	285	65
5	15	St. Louis Blues	82	21	46	15	197	292	57

Note: CR = Conference rank; GP = Games played; W = Wins; L = Losses; T = Ties; OTL = Overtime loss; GF = Goals for; GA = Goals against; Pts = Points
Bolded teams qualified for the playoffs.

Western Conference
R		Div	GP	W	L	OTL	GF	GA	Pts
**1**	**P-** Detroit Red Wings	**CE**	**82**	**58**	**16**	**8**	**305**	**209**	124
**2**	**Y-** Dallas Stars	**PA**	**82**	**53**	**23**	**6**	**265**	**218**	112
**3**	**Y-** Calgary Flames	**NW**	**82**	**46**	**25**	**11**	**218**	**200**	103
**4**	**X-** Nashville Predators	**CE**	**82**	**49**	**25**	**8**	**259**	**227**	106
**5**	**X-** San Jose Sharks	**PA**	**82**	**44**	**27**	**11**	**266**	**242**	99
**6**	**X-** Mighty Ducks of Anaheim	**PA**	**82**	**43**	**27**	**12**	**254**	**229**	98
**7**	**X-** Colorado Avalanche	**NW**	**82**	**43**	**30**	**9**	**283**	**257**	95
**8**	**X-** Edmonton Oilers	**NW**	**82**	**41**	**28**	**13**	**256**	**251**	95
8.5
9	Vancouver Canucks	NW	82	42	32	8	256	255	92
10	Los Angeles Kings	PA	82	42	35	5	249	270	89
11	Minnesota Wild	NW	82	38	36	8	231	215	84
12	Phoenix Coyotes	PA	82	38	39	5	246	271	81
13	Columbus Blue Jackets	CE	82	35	43	4	223	279	74
14	Chicago Blackhawks	CE	82	26	43	13	211	285	65
15	St. Louis Blues	CE	82	21	46	15	197	292	57

Divisions: CE – Central, PA – Pacific, NW – Northwest

P – Clinched Presidents Trophy; Y – Clinched division; X – Clinched playoff spot

== Schedule and results ==
=== Regular season ===
2005–06 regular season
October: 8–1–1 (home: 5–1–0; road: 3–0–1)

Game	Date	Score	Opponent	Record	Recap
1	October 5, 2005	3–2	San Jose Sharks (2005–06)	1–0–0	W
2	October 8, 2005	3–2 SO	Mighty Ducks of Anaheim (2005–06)	2–0–0	W
3	October 12, 2005	5–4	@ Colorado Avalanche (2005–06)	3–0–0	W
4	October 13, 2005	5–4 SO	@ Phoenix Coyotes (2005–06)	4–0–0	W
5	October 15, 2005	4–1	@ St. Louis Blues (2005–06)	5–0–0	W
6	October 20, 2005	3–2 SO	St. Louis Blues (2005–06)	6–0–0	W
7	October 22, 2005	2–1	San Jose Sharks (2005–06)	7–0–0	W
8	October 25, 2005	5–3	Chicago Blackhawks (2005–06)	8–0–0	W
9	October 26, 2005	2–3 OT	@ Columbus Blue Jackets (2005–06)	8–0–1	OTL
10	October 29, 2005	1–5	Edmonton Oilers (2005–06)	8–1–1	L

November: 7–3–2 (home: 6–1–0; road: 1–2–2)

Game	Date	Score	Opponent	Record	Recap
11	November 1, 2005	1–4	@ Mighty Ducks of Anaheim (2005–06)	8–2–1	L
12	November 2, 2005	2–3 OT	@ San Jose Sharks (2005–06)	8–2–2	OTL
13	November 5, 2005	2–3 SO	@ Los Angeles Kings (2005–06)	8–2–3	OTL
14	November 8, 2005	3–2	Edmonton Oilers (2005–06)	9–2–3	W
15	November 10, 2005	5–3	Dallas Stars (2005–06)	10–2–3	W
16	November 12, 2005	3–1	St. Louis Blues (2005–06)	11–2–3	W
17	November 15, 2005	3–2	Los Angeles Kings (2005–06)	12–2–3	W
18	November 19, 2005	2–4	@ Minnesota Wild (2005–06)	12–3–3	L
19	November 23, 2005	4–2	@ Columbus Blue Jackets (2005–06)	13–3–3	W
20	November 24, 2005	4–3	Los Angeles Kings (2005–06)	14–3–3	W
21	November 26, 2005	1–3	Dallas Stars (2005–06)	14–4–3	L
22	November 29, 2005	2–0	Calgary Flames (2005–06)	15–4–3	W

December: 9–5–0 (home: 5–1–0; road: 4–4–0)

Game	Date	Score	Opponent	Record	Recap
23	December 1, 2005	2–1	Minnesota Wild (2005–06)	16–4–3	W
24	December 3, 2005	4–3 SO	Philadelphia Flyers (2005–06)	17–4–3	W
25	December 7, 2005	5–2	@ Washington Capitals (2005–06)	18–4–3	W
26	December 8, 2005	1–5	New York Rangers (2005–06)	18–5–3	L
27	December 10, 2005	3–4	@ Tampa Bay Lightning (2005–06)	18–6–3	L
28	December 13, 2005	3–7	@ Florida Panthers (2005–06)	18–7–3	L
29	December 15, 2005	5–3	Chicago Blackhawks (2005–06)	19–7–3	W
30	December 17, 2005	7–3	Columbus Blue Jackets (2005–06)	20–7–3	W
31	December 20, 2005	3–2	Colorado Avalanche (2005–06)	21–7–3	W
32	December 21, 2005	6–1	@ Chicago Blackhawks (2005–06)	22–7–3	W
33	December 23, 2005	5–4	@ Columbus Blue Jackets (2005–06)	23–7–3	W
34	December 27, 2005	4–3	@ Calgary Flames (2005–06)	24–7–3	W
35	December 28, 2005	3–4	@ Vancouver Canucks (2005–06)	24–8–3	L
36	December 30, 2005	2–4	@ Edmonton Oilers (2005–06)	24–9–3	L

January: 7–5–3 (home: 3–2–1; road: 4–3–2)

Game	Date	Score	Opponent	Record	Recap
37	January 1, 2006	2–4	Mighty Ducks of Anaheim (2005–06)	24–10–3	L
38	January 3, 2006	0–3	@ Colorado Avalanche (2005–06)	24–11–3	L
39	January 4, 2006	4–3	@ St. Louis Blues (2005–06)	25–11–3	W
40	January 6, 2006	1–3	Detroit Red Wings (2005–06)	25–12–3	L
41	January 8, 2006	5–1	@ Chicago Blackhawks (2005–06)	26–12–3	W
42	January 10, 2006	2–1	New York Islanders (2005–06)	27–12–3	W
43	January 11, 2006	3–4 SO	@ Atlanta Thrashers (2005–06)	27–12–4	OTL
44	January 13, 2006	4–5 OT	@ Carolina Hurricanes (2005–06)	27–12–5	OTL
45	January 15, 2006	5–4	Pittsburgh Penguins (2005–06)	28–12–5	W
46	January 19, 2006	3–4 SO	New Jersey Devils (2005–06)	28–12–6	OTL
47	January 21, 2006	7–2	Columbus Blue Jackets (2005–06)	29–12–6	W
48	January 23, 2006	3–2	@ Detroit Red Wings (2005–06)	30–12–6	W
49	January 24, 2006	2–1 OT	@ Detroit Red Wings (2005–06)	31–12–6	W
50	January 26, 2006	1–5	@ Minnesota Wild (2005–06)	31–13–6	L
51	January 28, 2006	3–4	@ Columbus Blue Jackets (2005–06)	31–14–6	L

February: 3–4–0 (home: 3–1–0; road: 0–3–0)

Game	Date	Score	Opponent	Record	Recap
52	February 1, 2006	1–2	@ Dallas Stars (2005–06)	31–15–6	L
53	February 2, 2006	4–3 OT	Colorado Avalanche (2005–06)	32–15–6	W
54	February 4, 2006	6–0	Chicago Blackhawks (2005–06)	33–15–6	W
55	February 6, 2006	2–4	@ Dallas Stars (2005–06)	33–16–6	L
56	February 8, 2006	0–6	@ Detroit Red Wings (2005–06)	33–17–6	L
57	February 9, 2006	2–3	Detroit Red Wings (2005–06)	33–18–6	L
58	February 11, 2006	5–2	Columbus Blue Jackets (2005–06)	34–18–6	W

March: 8–5–2 (home: 5–1–0; road: 3–4–2)

Game	Date	Score	Opponent	Record	Recap
59	March 1, 2006	0–3	@ Chicago Blackhawks (2005–06)	34–19–6	L
60	March 2, 2006	3–1	Vancouver Canucks (2005–06)	35–19–6	W
61	March 5, 2006	2–3 OT	@ Edmonton Oilers (2005–06)	35–19–7	OTL
62	March 7, 2006	3–2	@ Calgary Flames (2005–06)	36–19–7	W
63	March 9, 2006	3–2 OT	@ Vancouver Canucks (2005–06)	37–19–7	W
64	March 11, 2006	2–3 OT	@ San Jose Sharks (2005–06)	37–19–8	OTL
65	March 14, 2006	5–0	Vancouver Canucks (2005–06)	38–19–8	W
66	March 16, 2006	2–0	Phoenix Coyotes (2005–06)	39–19–8	W
67	March 18, 2006	9–4	Calgary Flames (2005–06)	40–19–8	W
68	March 20, 2006	4–2	St. Louis Blues (2005–06)	41–19–8	W
69	March 21, 2006	3–2 SO	@ Detroit Red Wings (2005–06)	42–19–8	W
70	March 24, 2006	3–6	@ Mighty Ducks of Anaheim (2005–06)	42–20–8	L
71	March 25, 2006	4–6	@ Los Angeles Kings (2005–06)	42–21–8	L
72	March 28, 2006	3–5	@ Phoenix Coyotes (2005–06)	42–22–8	L
73	March 30, 2006	2–4	Detroit Red Wings (2005–06)	42–23–8	L

April: 7–2–0 (home: 5–1–0; road: 2–1–0)

Game	Date	Score	Opponent	Record	Recap
74	April 1, 2006	2–1	St. Louis Blues (2005–06)	43–23–8	W
75	April 3, 2006	1–3	Columbus Blue Jackets (2005–06)	43–24–8	L
76	April 5, 2006	3–4	@ Chicago Blackhawks (2005–06)	43–25–8	L
77	April 6, 2006	3–0	@ St. Louis Blues (2005–06)	44–25–8	W
78	April 8, 2006	2–1 SO	Chicago Blackhawks (2005–06)	45–25–8	W
79	April 11, 2006	2–0	@ St. Louis Blues (2005–06)	46–25–8	W
80	April 13, 2006	4–2	Minnesota Wild (2005–06)	47–25–8	W
81	April 15, 2006	5–1	Phoenix Coyotes (2005–06)	48–25–8	W
82	April 18, 2006	6–3	Detroit Red Wings (2005–06)	49–25–8	W

Legend: W Win (2 points) L Loss (0 points) OTL Overtime/shootout loss (1 point)

=== Playoffs ===
2006 Stanley Cup playoffs
Western Conference quarterfinals: vs. (5) San Jose Sharks — Sharks win 4–1

Game	Date	Score	Opponent	Series	Recap
1	April 21, 2006	4–3	San Jose Sharks	Predators lead 1–0	W
2	April 23, 2006	0–3	San Jose Sharks	Series tied 1–1	L
3	April 25, 2006	1–4	@ San Jose Sharks	Sharks lead 2–1	L
4	April 27, 2006	4–5	@ San Jose Sharks	Sharks lead 3–1	L
5	April 30, 2006	1–2	San Jose Sharks	Sharks win 4–1	L

Legend: W Win L Loss

== Player statistics ==
=== Scoring ===
- Position abbreviations: C = Center; D = Defense; G = Goaltender; LW = Left wing; RW = Right wing
- † = Joined team via a transaction (e.g., trade, waivers, signing) during the season. Stats reflect time with the Predators only.
- ‡ = Left team via a transaction (e.g., trade, waivers, release) during the season. Stats reflect time with the Predators only.

No.	Player	Pos	Regular season						Playoffs					
No.	Player	Pos	GP	G	A	Pts	+/-	PIM	GP	G	A	Pts	+/-	PIM
9	Paul Kariya	LW	82	31	54	85	−6	40	5	2	5	7	0	0
26	Steve Sullivan	RW	69	31	37	68	2	50	5	0	2	2	−2	0
94	Yanic Perreault	C	69	22	35	57	−3	30	1	0	0	0	0	2
44	Kimmo Timonen	D	79	11	39	50	−3	74	5	1	3	4	0	4
10	Martin Erat	RW	80	20	29	49	0	76	5	1	1	2	−1	6
3	Marek Zidlicky	D	67	12	37	49	8	82	2	0	1	1	0	2
17	Scott Hartnell	LW	81	25	23	48	8	101	5	1	0	1	0	4
2	Dan Hamhuis	D	82	7	31	38	11	70	5	0	2	2	−2	2
18	Adam Hall	RW	75	14	15	29	0	40	5	1	0	1	−3	0
11	David Legwand	C	44	7	19	26	3	34	5	0	1	1	−1	8
7	Scottie Upshall	LW	48	8	16	24	14	34	2	0	0	0	0	0
81	Mike Sillinger†	C	31	10	12	22	0	14	5	2	1	3	−1	12
22	Greg Johnson	C	68	11	8	19	6	10	5	0	1	1	0	2
24	Scott Walker	RW	33	5	11	16	2	36	5	0	0	0	0	6
20	Ryan Suter	D	71	1	15	16	7	66	—	—	—	—	—	—
25 (Note: Smithson wore number 42 in his first 14 games.)	Jerred Smithson	C	66	5	9	14	9	54	3	0	0	0	0	4
16	Darcy Hordichuk	LW	74	7	6	13	9	163	—	—	—	—	—	—
38	Vernon Fiddler	C	40	8	4	12	−2	42	2	0	1	1	−1	0
55	Danny Markov	D	58	0	11	11	9	62	5	0	0	0	−1	6
14	Jordin Tootoo	RW	34	4	6	10	9	55	3	0	0	0	−1	0
6 (Note: Weber wore number 48 in his first six games.)	Shea Weber	D	28	2	8	10	8	42	4	2	0	2	−3	8
28	Jeremy Stevenson‡	LW	35	4	3	7	0	74	—	—	—	—	—	—
12	Scott Nichol	C	34	3	3	6	3	79	3	0	0	0	−2	2
4	Mark Eaton	D	69	3	1	4	−2	44	5	0	0	0	0	8
15 (Note: Beech wore number 56 in his first three games.)	Kris Beech‡	C	5	1	2	3	1	0	—	—	—	—	—	—
19	Brendan Witt†	D	17	0	3	3	5	68	5	0	0	0	−3	12
29	Tomas Vokoun	G	61	0	2	2		26	—	—	—	—	—	—
37	Greg Zanon	D	4	0	2	2	0	6	—	—	—	—	—	—
30	Chris Mason	G	23	1	0	1		0	5	0	0	0		0
23	Jamie Allison‡	D	20	0	1	1	−6	45	—	—	—	—	—	—
31	Brian Finley	G	1	0	0	0		0	—	—	—	—	—	—
41	Simon Gamache‡†	C	11	0	0	0	−6	0	—	—	—	—	—	—
49	Kevin Klein	D	2	0	0	0	−1	0	—	—	—	—	—	—
35	Pekka Rinne	G	2	0	0	0		0	—	—	—	—	—	—

=== Goaltending ===
No.	Player	Regular season										Playoffs								
No.	Player	GP	W	L	OT	SA	GA	GAA	SV%	SO	TOI	GP	W	L	SA	GA	GAA	SV%	SO	TOI
29	Tomas Vokoun	61	36	18	7	1984	160	2.67	.919	4	3601	—	—	—	—	—	—	—	—	—
30	Chris Mason	23	12	5	1	597	52	2.54	.913	2	1227	5	1	4	171	17	3.45	.901	0	296
35	Pekka Rinne	2	1	1	0	40	4	3.81	.900	0	63	—	—	—	—	—	—	—	—	—
31	Brian Finley	1	0	1	0	41	7	7.00	.829	0	60	—	—	—	—	—	—	—	—	—

== Awards and records ==
=== Awards ===
Type	Award/honor	Recipient	Ref
League (in-season)	NHL Defensive Player of the Week	Tomas Vokoun (December 5)	
League (in-season)	NHL Defensive Player of the Week	Tomas Vokoun (March 20)	
League (in-season)	NHL Offensive Player of the Week	Steve Sullivan (October 17)	

=== Milestones ===
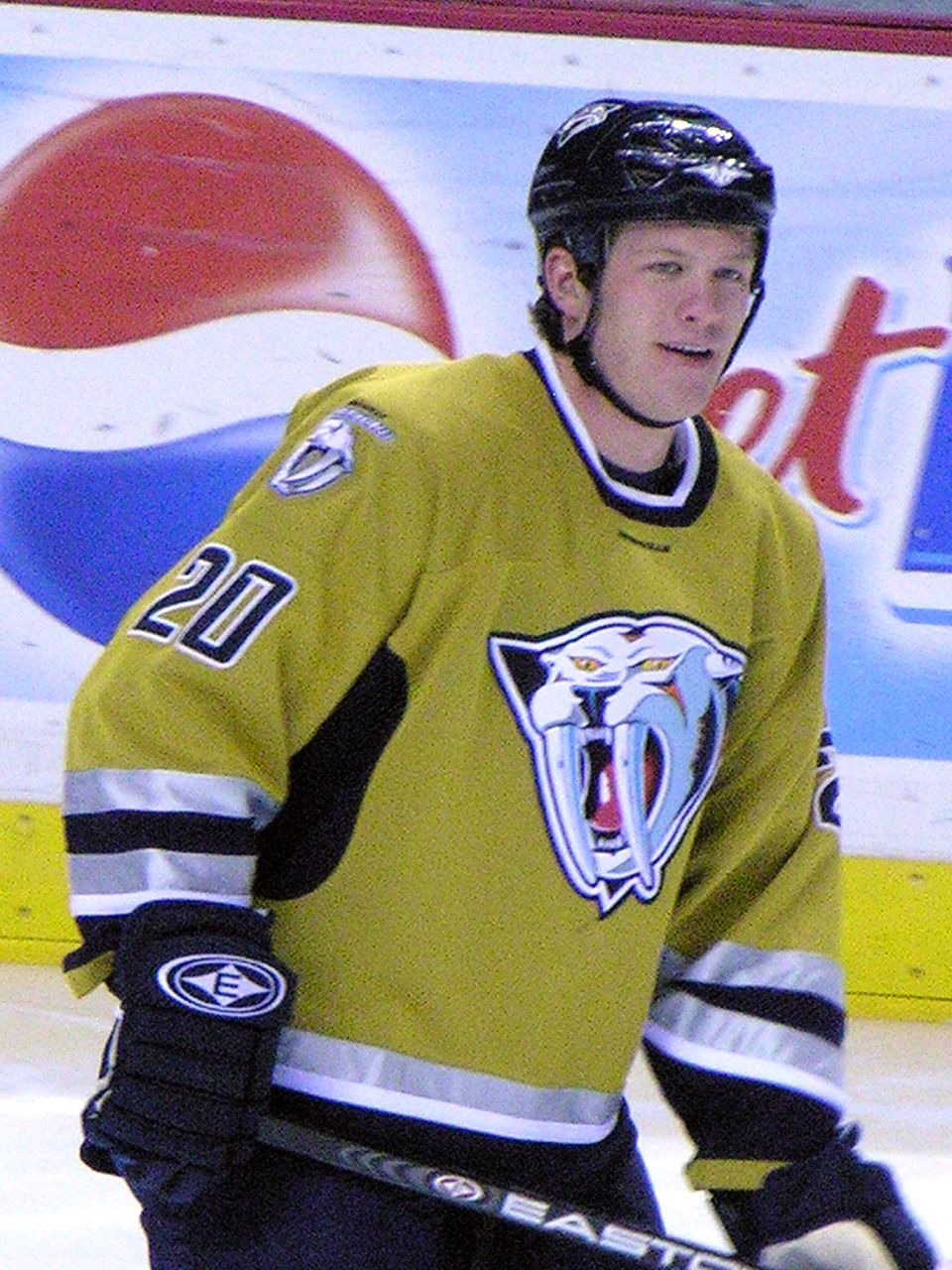
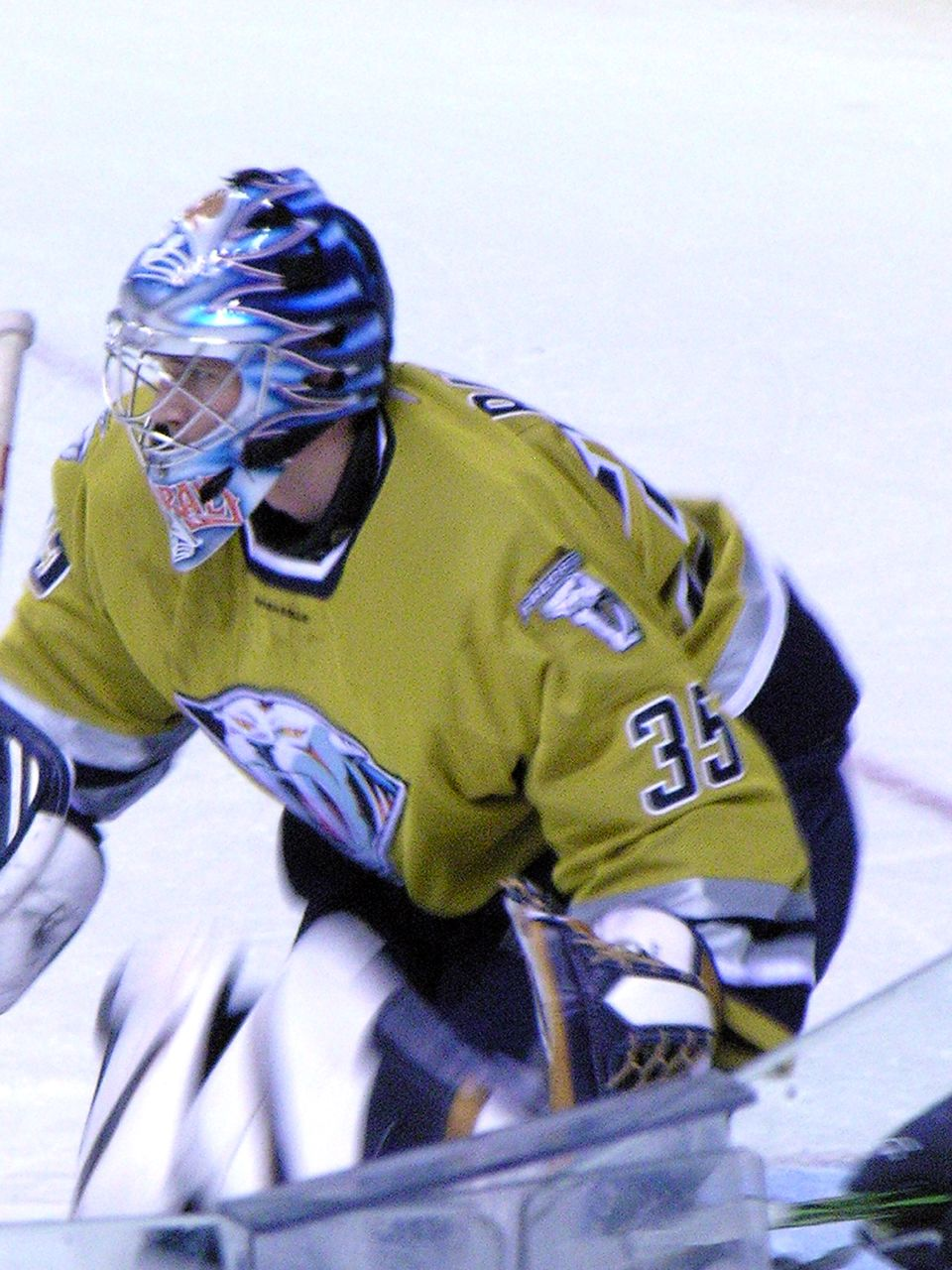
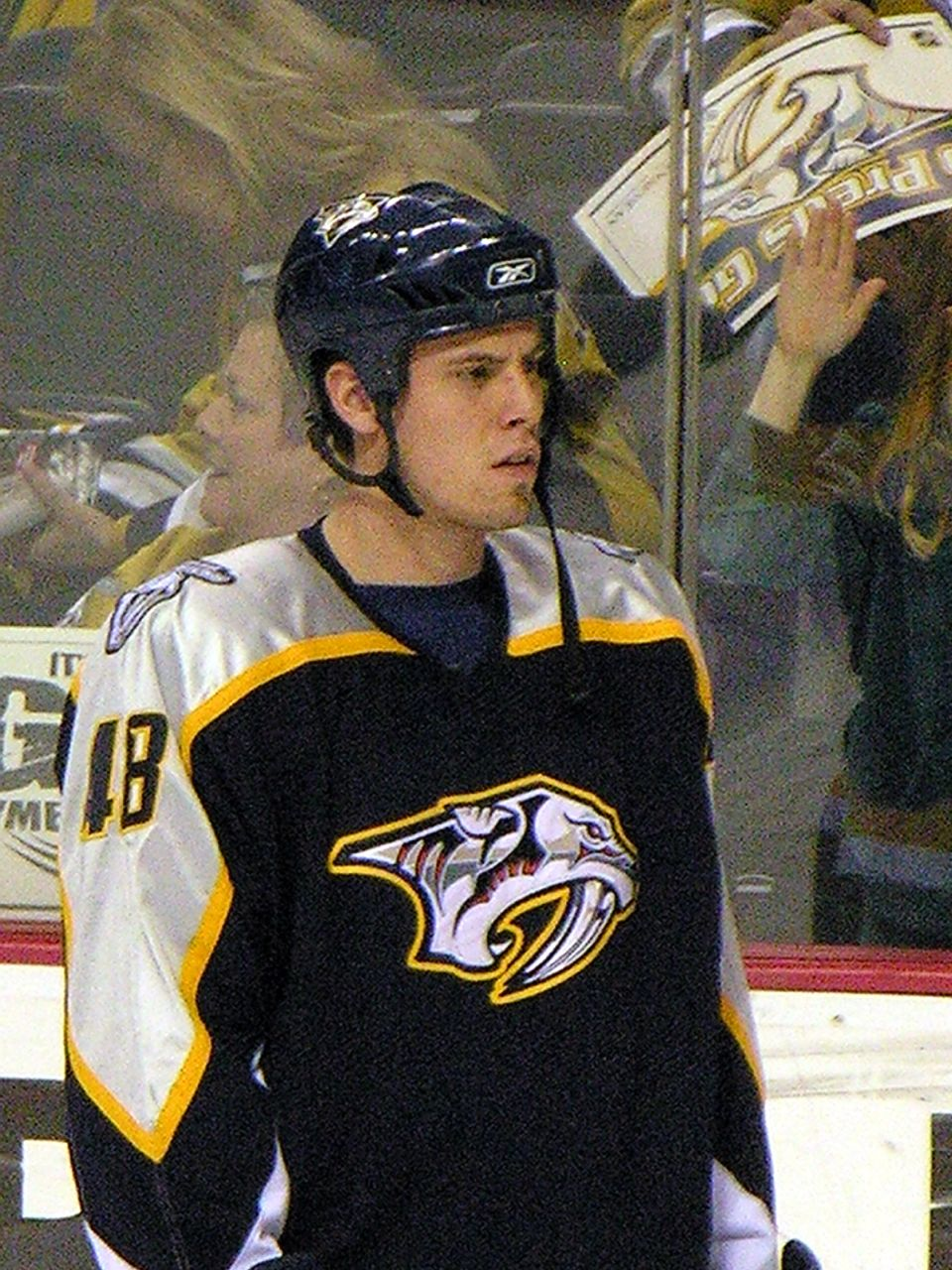
Ryan Suter (left), Pekka Rinne (middle), and Shea Weber (right) made their NHL debuts during the 2005–06 season.

Milestone	Player	Date	Ref
First game	Ryan Suter	October 5, 2005	
First game	Greg Zanon	December 1, 2005	
First game	Kevin Klein	December 3, 2005	
First game	Pekka Rinne	December 15, 2005	
First game	Shea Weber	January 6, 2006	

== Transactions ==
The Predators were involved in the following transactions from February 17, 2005, the day after the 2004–05 NHL season was officially cancelled, through June 19, 2006, the day of the deciding game of the 2006 Stanley Cup Finals.

=== Trades ===
Date	Details		Ref
July 27, 2005	To Florida Panthers: 4th-round pick in 2005	To Nashville Predators: Darcy Hordichuk	
July 29, 2005	To Carolina Hurricanes: Andrew Hutchinson	To Nashville Predators: Phoenix's 3rd-round pick in 2005	
July 30, 2005	To Atlanta Thrashers: Shane Hnidy	To Nashville Predators: 4th-round pick in 2006	
August 2, 2005	To Philadelphia Flyers: 3rd-round pick in 2006	To Nashville Predators: Danny Markov	
September 9, 2005	To Pittsburgh Penguins: Conditional draft pick in 2006	To Nashville Predators: Kris Beech	
October 24, 2005	To Phoenix Coyotes: Future considerations	To Nashville Predators: Rick Berry	
January 29, 2006	To St. Louis Blues: Timofei Shishkanov	To Nashville Predators: Mike Sillinger	
March 9, 2006	To Washington Capitals: Kris Beech; 1st-round pick in 2006	To Nashville Predators: Brendan Witt	

=== Players acquired ===
Date	Player	Former team	Term	Via	Ref
August 4, 2005	Sheldon Brookbank	Anaheim Mighty Ducks		Free agency	
August 5, 2005	Paul Kariya	Colorado Avalanche	2-year	Free agency	
August 6, 2005	Scott Nichol	Chicago Blackhawks		Free agency	
August 19, 2005	Randy Robitaille	ZSC Lions (NLA)		Free agency	
August 31, 2005	Greg Classen	Porin Assat (Liiga)		Free agency	
October 3, 2005	Yanic Perreault	Montreal Canadiens		Free agency	
December 7, 2005	John Vigilante	Plymouth Whalers (OHL)		Free agency	
January 28, 2006	Simon Gamache	St. Louis Blues		Waivers	
May 18, 2006	Ville Koistinen	Ilves (Liiga)	1-year	Free agency	

=== Players lost ===
Date	Player	New team	Via (Note: In parentheses is the player's free agency group on August 1 if applicable.)	Ref
August 1, 2005	Tony Hrkac (Note: Hrkac retired.)		Contract expiration (III)	
August 1, 2005	Jim McKenzie (Note: McKenzie retired.)		Contract expiration (III)	
August 10, 2005	Wyatt Smith	New York Islanders	Free agency (UFA)	
August 11, 2005	Cam Severson	Calgary Flames	Free agency	
August 25, 2005	Andreas Lilja	Detroit Red Wings	Free agency (UFA)	
October 4, 2005	Randy Robitaille	Minnesota Wild	Waivers	
October 18, 2005	Vladimir Orszagh	Lulea HF (SHL)	Free agency (UFA)	
November 29, 2005	Simon Gamache	St. Louis Blues	Waivers	
February 13, 2006	Jamie Allison	Florida Panthers	Waivers	
February 15, 2006	Jeremy Stevenson	Dallas Stars	Waivers	
May 6, 2006	Simon Gamache	SC Bern (NLA)	Free agency	

=== Signings ===
Date	Player	Term	Contract type	Ref
July 28, 2005	Vernon Fiddler	1-year	Option exercised	
July 28, 2005	Greg Johnson		Re-signing	
July 28, 2005	Chris Mason	1-year	Option exercised	
July 28, 2005	Libor Pivko		Re-signing	
July 28, 2005	Jerred Smithson		Re-signing	
July 31, 2005	Jamie Allison		Re-signing	
July 31, 2005	Brian Finley		Re-signing	
August 4, 2005	Mark Eaton		Re-signing	
August 10, 2005	Scott Hartnell		Re-signing	
August 10, 2005	Jeremy Yablonski		Re-signing	
August 15, 2005	Simon Gamache	1-year	Re-signing	
August 15, 2005	Darren Haydar	1-year	Re-signing	
August 15, 2005	Darcy Hordichuk	1-year	Re-signing	
August 15, 2005	David Legwand	1-year	Re-signing	
August 15, 2005	Greg Zanon	2-year	Re-signing	
August 16, 2005	Dan Hamhuis	1-year	Re-signing	
August 16, 2005	Steve Sullivan	4-year	Re-signing	
August 23, 2005	Pekka Rinne		Entry-level	
August 29, 2005	Martin Erat		Re-signing	
September 8, 2005	Adam Hall		Re-signing	
January 9, 2006	Alexander Radulov		Entry-level	
May 8, 2006	Marek Zidlicky	4-year	Re-signing	
May 9, 2006	Ryan Parent		Entry-level	
May 18, 2006	Vernon Fiddler	1-year	Re-signing	
May 22, 2006	Jerred Smithson	1-year	Re-signing	
June 2, 2006	Mikko Lehtonen	1-year	Entry-level	
June 2, 2006	Daniel Widing	1-year	Entry-level	

== Draft picks ==
Nashville's draft picks at the 2005 NHL entry draft held at the Westin Hotel in Ottawa, Ontario.

Round	#	Player	Nationality	College/Junior/Club team (League)
1	18	Ryan Parent	Canada	Guelph Storm (OHL)
3	78	Teemu Laakso	Finland	HIFK Jr. (Finland)
3	79	Cody Franson	Canada	Vancouver Giants (WHL)
5	150	Cal O'Reilly	Canada	Windsor Spitfires (OHL)
6	176	Ryan Maki	United States	Harvard University (ECAC)
7	213	Scott Todd	Canada	Windsor Spitfires (OHL)
7	230	Patric Hornqvist	Sweden	Väsby IK (Sweden)
