= 2005–06 Colorado Avalanche season =

National Hockey League team season

2005–06 Colorado Avalanche
- Division: 2nd Northwest
- Conference: 7th Western
- 2005–06 record: 43–30–9
- Home record: 25–10–6
- Road record: 18–20–3
- Goals for: 283
- Goals against: 257

Team information
- General manager: Pierre Lacroix
- Coach: Joel Quenneville
- Captain: Joe Sakic
- Alternate captains: Rob Blake; Steve Konowalchuk
- Arena: Pepsi Center
- Average attendance: 18,007
- Minor league affiliates: Lowell Lock Monsters; San Diego Gulls

Team leaders
- Goals: Joe Sakic (32); Marek Svatos (32)
- Assists: Joe Sakic (55)
- Points: Joe Sakic (87)
- Penalty minutes: Ian Laperriere (116)
- Plus/minus: Milan Hejduk (+13)
- Wins: David Aebischer (25)
- Goals against average: Peter Budaj (2.86)

The 2005–06 Colorado Avalanche season was the 11th operational season and 10th playing season since the franchise relocated from Quebec prior to the start of the 1995–96 NHL season. As well as the franchise's 27th season in the National Hockey League and 34th season overall.

== Regular season ==
=== Final standings ===
Northwest Division
No.	CR		GP	W	L	OTL	GF	GA	Pts
1	3	**Calgary Flames**	82	46	25	11	218	200	103
2	7	**Colorado Avalanche**	82	43	30	9	283	257	95
3	8	**Edmonton Oilers**	82	41	28	13	256	251	95
4	9	Vancouver Canucks	82	42	32	8	256	255	92
5	11	Minnesota Wild	82	38	36	8	231	215	84

Note: CR = Conference rank; GP = Games played; W = Wins; L = Losses; T = Ties; OTL = Overtime loss; GF = Goals for; GA = Goals against; Pts = Points
Bolded teams qualified for the playoffs.

Western Conference
R		Div	GP	W	L	OTL	GF	GA	Pts
**1**	**P-** Detroit Red Wings	**CE**	**82**	**58**	**16**	**8**	**305**	**209**	124
**2**	**Y-** Dallas Stars	**PA**	**82**	**53**	**23**	**6**	**265**	**218**	112
**3**	**Y-** Calgary Flames	**NW**	**82**	**46**	**25**	**11**	**218**	**200**	103
**4**	**X-** Nashville Predators	**CE**	**82**	**49**	**25**	**8**	**259**	**227**	106
**5**	**X-** San Jose Sharks	**PA**	**82**	**44**	**27**	**11**	**266**	**242**	99
**6**	**X-** Mighty Ducks of Anaheim	**PA**	**82**	**43**	**27**	**12**	**254**	**229**	98
**7**	**X-** Colorado Avalanche	**NW**	**82**	**43**	**30**	**9**	**283**	**257**	95
**8**	**X-** Edmonton Oilers	**NW**	**82**	**41**	**28**	**13**	**256**	**251**	95
8.5
9	Vancouver Canucks	NW	82	42	32	8	256	255	92
8	Los Angeles Kings	PA	82	42	35	5	249	270	89
11	Minnesota Wild	NW	82	38	36	8	231	215	84
12	Phoenix Coyotes	PA	82	38	39	5	246	271	81
13	Columbus Blue Jackets	CE	82	35	43	4	223	279	74
14	Chicago Blackhawks	CE	82	26	43	13	211	285	65
15	St. Louis Blues	CE	82	21	46	15	197	292	57

Divisions: CE – Central, PA – Pacific, NW – Northwest

P – Clinched Presidents Trophy; Y – Clinched division; X – Clinched playoff spot

== Schedule and results ==
=== Regular season ===
2005–06 regular season
October: 6–4–1 (home: 4–2–1; road: 2–2–0)

Game	Date	Score	Opponent	Record	Recap
1	October 5, 2005	3–4	@ Edmonton Oilers (2005–06)	0–1–0	L
2	October 8, 2005	3–2	@ Dallas Stars (2005–06)	1–1–0	W
3	October 10, 2005	7–3	Calgary Flames (2005–06)	2–1–0	W
4	October 12, 2005	4–5	Nashville Predators (2005–06)	2–2–0	L
5	October 14, 2005	2–3 SO	Chicago Blackhawks (2005–06)	2–2–1	OTL
6	October 19, 2005	4–5	Los Angeles Kings (2005–06)	2–3–1	L
7	October 21, 2005	7–1	@ Edmonton Oilers (2005–06)	3–3–1	W
8	October 22, 2005	4–6	@ Vancouver Canucks (2005–06)	3–4–1	L
9	October 25, 2005	5–3	Edmonton Oilers (2005–06)	4–4–1	W
10	October 27, 2005	6–2	Vancouver Canucks (2005–06)	5–4–1	W
11	October 29, 2005	4–3 OT	Vancouver Canucks (2005–06)	6–4–1	W

November: 8–5–2 (home: 3–1–2; road: 5–4–0)

Game	Date	Score	Opponent	Record	Recap
12	November 3, 2005	4–3	Mighty Ducks of Anaheim (2005–06)	7–4–1	W
13	November 5, 2005	2–3 SO	Dallas Stars (2005–06)	7–4–2	OTL
14	November 8, 2005	5–2	San Jose Sharks (2005–06)	8–4–2	W
15	November 10, 2005	5–3	@ Vancouver Canucks (2005–06)	9–4–2	W
16	November 12, 2005	3–5	@ Calgary Flames (2005–06)	9–5–2	L
17	November 14, 2005	2–5	Edmonton Oilers (2005–06)	9–6–2	L
18	November 16, 2005	3–1	@ Phoenix Coyotes (2005–06)	10–6–2	W
19	November 18, 2005	3–2	@ Mighty Ducks of Anaheim (2005–06)	11–6–2	W
20	November 19, 2005	3–4	@ Los Angeles Kings (2005–06)	11–7–2	L
21	November 21, 2005	2–3 SO	Calgary Flames (2005–06)	11–7–3	OTL
22	November 23, 2005	3–7	@ Detroit Red Wings (2005–06)	11–8–3	L
23	November 25, 2005	5–0	@ Columbus Blue Jackets (2005–06)	12–8–3	W
24	November 27, 2005	6–2	Vancouver Canucks (2005–06)	13–8–3	W
25	November 29, 2005	3–2	@ Edmonton Oilers (2005–06)	14–8–3	W
26	November 30, 2005	2–5	@ Vancouver Canucks (2005–06)	14–9–3	L

December: 6–8–0 (home: 3–3–0; road: 3–5–0)

Game	Date	Score	Opponent	Record	Recap
27	December 4, 2005	4–6	Buffalo Sabres (2005–06)	14–10–3	L
28	December 7, 2005	4–1	Boston Bruins (2005–06)	15–10–3	W
29	December 9, 2005	4–3 SO	@ New Jersey Devils (2005–06)	16–10–3	W
30	December 10, 2005	3–4	@ Pittsburgh Penguins (2005–06)	16–11–3	L
31	December 12, 2005	2–6	Ottawa Senators (2005–06)	16–12–3	L
32	December 17, 2005	4–5	@ New York Islanders (2005–06)	16–13–3	L
33	December 18, 2005	2–1	@ New York Rangers (2005–06)	17–13–3	W
34	December 20, 2005	2–3	@ Nashville Predators (2005–06)	17–14–3	L
35	December 22, 2005	4–3	Minnesota Wild (2005–06)	18–14–3	W
36	December 23, 2005	3–5	@ Minnesota Wild (2005–06)	18–15–3	L
37	December 26, 2005	7–4	Phoenix Coyotes (2005–06)	19–15–3	W
38	December 28, 2005	3–5	Los Angeles Kings (2005–06)	19–16–3	L
39	December 30, 2005	2–5	@ San Jose Sharks (2005–06)	19–17–3	L
40	December 31, 2005	5–2	@ Phoenix Coyotes (2005–06)	20–17–3	W

January: 9–2–2 (home: 7–1–2; road: 2–1–0)

Game	Date	Score	Opponent	Record	Recap
41	January 3, 2006	3–0	Nashville Predators (2005–06)	21–17–3	W
42	January 5, 2006	4–2	@ Minnesota Wild (2005–06)	22–17–3	W
43	January 7, 2006	3–2 SO	Columbus Blue Jackets (2005–06)	23–17–3	W
44	January 9, 2006	6–1	St. Louis Blues (2005–06)	24–17–3	W
45	January 11, 2006	2–1	Montreal Canadiens (2005–06)	25–17–3	W
46	January 14, 2006	4–3 OT	@ Philadelphia Flyers (2005–06)	26–17–3	W
47	January 17, 2006	5–3	Toronto Maple Leafs (2005–06)	27–17–3	W
48	January 19, 2006	2–4	@ Chicago Blackhawks (2005–06)	27–18–3	L
49	January 21, 2006	3–4	Detroit Red Wings (2005–06)	27–19–3	L
50	January 24, 2006	7–4	Calgary Flames (2005–06)	28–19–3	W
51	January 26, 2006	2–3 SO	Dallas Stars (2005–06)	28–19–4	OTL
52	January 28, 2006	3–4 SO	Vancouver Canucks (2005–06)	28–19–5	OTL
53	January 31, 2006	3–2	Minnesota Wild (2005–06)	29–19–5	W

February: 4–2–1 (home: 2–1–0; road: 2–1–1)

Game	Date	Score	Opponent	Record	Recap
54	February 2, 2006	3–4 OT	@ Nashville Predators (2005–06)	29–19–6	OTL
55	February 4, 2006	0–3	Detroit Red Wings (2005–06)	29–20–6	L
56	February 7, 2006	5–2	Edmonton Oilers (2005–06)	30–20–6	W
57	February 9, 2006	2–1	@ Minnesota Wild (2005–06)	31–20–6	W
58	February 10, 2006	4–1	@ Columbus Blue Jackets (2005–06)	32–20–6	W
59	February 12, 2006	3–6	@ Detroit Red Wings (2005–06)	32–21–6	L
60	February 28, 2006	4–2	Minnesota Wild (2005–06)	33–21–6	W

March: 7–5–2 (home: 3–0–1; road: 4–5–1)

Game	Date	Score	Opponent	Record	Recap
61	March 2, 2006	1–0	Columbus Blue Jackets (2005–06)	34–21–6	W
62	March 4, 2006	3–5	@ Dallas Stars (2005–06)	34–22–6	L
63	March 5, 2006	3–5	@ Minnesota Wild (2005–06)	34–23–6	L
64	March 7, 2006	2–1 SO	@ St. Louis Blues (2005–06)	35–23–6	W
65	March 9, 2006	2–1	@ Chicago Blackhawks (2005–06)	36–23–6	W
66	March 12, 2006	3–0	Calgary Flames (2005–06)	37–23–6	W
67	March 13, 2006	3–4	@ Calgary Flames (2005–06)	37–24–6	L
68	March 19, 2006	5–6	@ San Jose Sharks (2005–06)	37–25–6	L
69	March 20, 2006	5–0	@ Los Angeles Kings (2005–06)	38–25–6	W
70	March 22, 2006	4–5 OT	@ Mighty Ducks of Anaheim (2005–06)	38–25–7	OTL
71	March 25, 2006	3–2 OT	@ St. Louis Blues (2005–06)	39–25–7	W
72	March 26, 2006	3–4 SO	Edmonton Oilers (2005–06)	39–25–8	OTL
73	March 28, 2006	4–3	Mighty Ducks of Anaheim (2005–06)	40–25–8	W
74	March 31, 2006	3–6	@ Calgary Flames (2005–06)	40–26–8	L

April: 3–4–1 (home: 3–2–0; road: 0–2–1)

Game	Date	Score	Opponent	Record	Recap
75	April 3, 2006	4–3	Chicago Blackhawks (2005–06)	41–26–8	W
76	April 5, 2006	1–2	San Jose Sharks (2005–06)	41–27–8	L
77	April 8, 2006	4–2	St. Louis Blues (2005–06)	42–27–8	W
78	April 9, 2006	2–5	Minnesota Wild (2005–06)	42–28–8	L
79	April 11, 2006	6–4	Phoenix Coyotes (2005–06)	43–28–8	W
80	April 13, 2006	0–2	@ Calgary Flames (2005–06)	43–29–8	L
81	April 15, 2006	3–4 OT	@ Vancouver Canucks (2005–06)	43–29–9	OTL
82	April 17, 2006	2–4	@ Edmonton Oilers (2005–06)	43–30–9	L

Legend: W Win (2 points) L Loss (0 points) OTL Overtime/shootout loss (1 point)

=== Playoffs ===
2006 Stanley Cup playoffs
Western Conference Quarterfinals vs. (2) Dallas Stars – Avalanche win 4–1

Game	Date	Score	Opponent	Series	Recap
1	April 22, 2006	5–2	@ Dallas Stars	Avalanche lead 1–0	W
2	April 24, 2006	5–4 OT	@ Dallas Stars	Avalanche lead 2–0	W
3	April 26, 2006	4–3 OT	Dallas Stars	Avalanche lead 3–0	W
4	April 28, 2006	1–4	Dallas Stars	Avalanche lead 3–1	L
5	April 30, 2006	3–2 OT	@ Dallas Stars	Avalanche win 4–1	W

Western Conference Semifinals vs. (6) Anaheim Mighty Ducks – Mighty Ducks win 4–0

Game	Date	Score	Opponent	Series	Recap
1	May 5, 2006	0–5	@ Anaheim Mighty Ducks	Mighty Ducks lead 1–0	L
2	May 7, 2006	0–3	@ Anaheim Mighty Ducks	Mighty Ducks lead 2–0	L
3	May 9, 2006	3–4 OT	Anaheim Mighty Ducks	Mighty Ducks lead 3–0	L
4	May 11, 2006	1–4	Anaheim Mighty Ducks	Mighty Ducks win 4–0	L

Legend: W Win L Loss

== Player statistics ==
=== Scoring ===
- Position abbreviations: C = Center; D = Defense; G = Goaltender; LW = Left wing; RW = Right wing
- † = Joined team via a transaction (e.g., trade, waivers, signing) during the season. Stats reflect time with the Avalanche only.
- ‡ = Left team via a transaction (e.g., trade, waivers, release) during the season. Stats reflect time with the Avalanche only.

No.	Player	Pos	Regular season						Playoffs					
No.	Player	Pos	GP	G	A	Pts	+/-	PIM	GP	G	A	Pts	+/-	PIM
19	Joe Sakic	C	82	32	55	87	10	60	9	4	5	9	−1	6
18	Alex Tanguay	LW	71	29	49	78	8	46	9	2	4	6	1	12
15	Andrew Brunette	LW	82	24	39	63	9	48	9	3	6	9	−2	8
23	Milan Hejduk	RW	74	24	34	58	13	24	9	2	6	8	3	2
4	Rob Blake	D	81	14	37	51	2	94	9	3	1	4	1	8
40	Marek Svatos	RW	61	32	18	50	0	60	—	—	—	—	—	—
26	John-Michael Liles	D	82	14	35	49	5	44	9	1	2	3	−1	6
87	Pierre Turgeon	C	62	16	30	46	1	32	5	0	2	2	−3	6
14	Ian Laperriere	RW	82	21	24	45	3	116	9	0	1	1	−6	27
53	Brett McLean	C	82	9	31	40	−7	51	8	0	1	1	−5	4
71	Patrice Brisebois	D	80	10	28	38	1	55	9	0	1	1	−7	4
5	Brett Clark	D	80	9	27	36	3	56	9	2	2	4	−2	2
24	Antti Laaksonen	LW	81	16	18	34	−2	40	9	0	2	2	−3	2
22	Steve Konowalchuk	LW	21	6	9	15	5	14	2	0	0	0	−1	4
3	Karlis Skrastins	D	82	3	11	14	−7	65	9	0	1	1	−3	10
13	Dan Hinote	RW	73	5	8	13	−5	48	9	1	1	2	−2	31
12	Brad Richardson	C	41	3	10	13	0	12	9	1	0	1	−3	6
11	Cody McCormick	C	45	4	4	8	1	29	—	—	—	—	—	—
6	Bob Boughner	D	41	1	6	7	2	54	—	—	—	—	—	—
10	Brad May	LW	54	3	3	6	−14	82	3	0	0	0	−3	0
8	Wojtek Wolski	LW	9	2	4	6	−5	4	8	1	3	4	−3	2
34	Kurt Sauer	D	37	1	4	5	5	24	9	0	0	0	−3	4
27	Ossi Vaananen	D	53	0	4	4	10	56	1	0	0	0	0	0
38	Jim Dowd†	C	18	2	1	3	−6	2	9	2	3	5	3	20
1	David Aebischer‡	G	43	0	3	3		16	—	—	—	—	—	—
31	Peter Budaj	G	34	0	1	1		4	—	—	—	—	—	—
20	Vitali Kolesnik	G	8	0	1	1		2	—	—	—	—	—	—
37	Paul Healey	LW	2	0	0	0	0	14	—	—	—	—	—	—
60	Jose Theodore†	G	5	0	0	0		0	9	0	0	0		0

=== Goaltending ===
- † = Joined team via a transaction (e.g., trade, waivers, signing) during the season. Stats reflect time with the Avalanche only.
- ‡ = Left team via a transaction (e.g., trade, waivers, release) during the season. Stats reflect time with the Avalanche only.

No.	Player	Regular season										Playoffs								
No.	Player	GP	W	L	OT	SA	GA	GAA	SV%	SO	TOI	GP	W	L	SA	GA	GAA	SV%	SO	TOI
1	David Aebischer‡	43	25	14	2	1233	123	2.98	.900	3	2477	–	–	–	–	–	–	–	–	–
31	Peter Budaj	34	14	10	6	864	86	2.86	.900	2	1803	–	–	–	–	–	–	–	–	–
20	Vitali Kolesnik	8	3	3	0	178	20	3.24	.888	0	370	–	–	–	–	–	–	–	–	–
60	Jose Theodore†	5	1	3	1	133	15	3.04	.887	0	296	9	4	5	296	29	3.04	.902	0	573

== Awards and records ==
=== Awards ===
Type	Award/honor	Recipient	Ref
League (in-season)	NHL Defensive Player of the Week	David Aebischer (January 9) (Note: Co-winner with Antero Niittymaki of the Philadelphia Flyers)	

=== Milestones ===
Milestone	Player	Date	Ref
First game	Wojtek Wolski	October 5, 2005	
First game	Peter Budaj	October 8, 2005	
First game	Brad Richardson	November 27, 2005	
First game	Vitali Kolesnik	December 7, 2005	

== Transactions ==
The Avalanche were involved in the following transactions from February 17, 2005, the day after the 2004–05 NHL season was officially cancelled, through June 19, 2006, the day of the deciding game of the 2006 Stanley Cup Finals.

=== Trades ===
Date	Details		Ref
July 30, 2005	To Washington Capitals: 1st-round pick in 2005	To Colorado Avalanche: 2nd-round pick in 2005; Ottawa’s 2nd-round pick in 2005	
August 9, 2005	To Calgary Flames: Philippe Sauve	To Colorado Avalanche: Conditional 7th-round pick in 2006	
March 8, 2006	To Montreal Canadiens: David Aebischer	To Colorado Avalanche: Jose Theodore	
March 9, 2006	To Chicago Blackhawks: 4th-round pick in 2006	To Colorado Avalanche: Jim Dowd	
June 1, 2006	To San Jose Sharks: Conditional draft pick	To Colorado Avalanche: Rights to Michael Vernace	

=== Players acquired ===
Date	Player	Former team	Term	Via	Ref
August 3, 2005	Patrice Brisebois	Montreal Canadiens	2-year	Free agency	
August 3, 2005	Pierre Turgeon	Dallas Stars	2-year	Free agency	
August 5, 2005	Brad May	Vancouver Canucks	2-year	Free agency	
August 6, 2005	Andrew Brunette	Minnesota Wild	2-year	Free agency	
August 16, 2005	Paul Healey	Florida Panthers		Free agency	
August 16, 2005	Vitali Kolesnik	Kazzinc-Torpedo (VHL)		Free agency	
August 17, 2005	Curtis Leschyshyn	Ottawa Senators		Free agency	
October 11, 2005	Dan DaSilva	Portland Winter Hawks (WHL)		Free agency	
October 11, 2005	Mitch Love	Everett Silvertips (WHL)		Free agency	

=== Players lost ===
Date	Player	New team	Via (Note: In parentheses is the player's free agency group on August 1 if applicable.)	Ref
June 14, 2005	D. J. Smith		Retirement (VI)	
July 1, 2005	Mathieu Darche	Fuchse Duisburg (DEL)	Free agency (VI)	
July 9, 2005	Andre Savage	Malmo Redhawks (Allsvenskan)	Free agency (VI)	
July 28, 2005	Chris Gratton	Florida Panthers (Note: Gratton signed with Florida on August 12.)	Compliance buyout	
August 1, 2005	Sergei Klyazmin (Note: Klyazmin retired.)		Contract expiration (UFA)	
August 2, 2005	Adam Foote	Columbus Blue Jackets	Free agency (III)	
August 3, 2005	Peter Forsberg	Philadelphia Flyers	Free agency (III)	
August 8, 2005	Dennis Bonvie	Wilkes-Barre/Scranton Penguins (AHL)	Free agency (UFA)	
September 6, 2005	Jeff Ulmer	Hamburg Freezers (DEL)	Free agency (VI)	
September 7, 2005	Vincent Damphousse		Retirement (III)	
September 16, 2005	Agris Saviels	HK Riga 2000 (BHL)	Free agency (UFA)	
September 21, 2005	Darby Hendrickson	EC Red Bull Salzburg (EBEL)	Free agency (III)	
September 23, 2005	Peter Worrell	Hartford Wolf Pack (AHL)	Free agency (UFA)	
September 29, 2005	Chris Bala	Reading Royals (ECHL)	Free agency (VI)	
October 3, 2005	Curtis Leschyshyn		Retirement	
April 10, 2006	Mikko Viitanen	Lukko (Liiga)	Free agency (Note: Contract for the 2006–07 season.)	
June 15, 2006	Bob Boughner		Retirement	

=== Signings ===
Date	Player	Term	Contract type	Ref
August 4, 2005	Kurt Sauer	1-year	Re-signing	
August 4, 2005	Alex Tanguay	1-year	Re-signing	
August 6, 2005	Milan Hejduk	5-year	Re-signing	
August 9, 2005	Karlis Skrastins		Re-signing	
August 11, 2005	Jeff Finger	1-year	Re-signing	
August 11, 2005	Dan Hinote	1-year	Re-signing	
August 11, 2005	Marek Svatos	1-year	Re-signing	
August 16, 2005	David Aebischer		Re-signing	
August 16, 2005	Peter Budaj		Re-signing	
August 16, 2005	Brett Clark		Re-signing	
August 16, 2005	Tom Lawson		Re-signing	
August 18, 2005	John-Michael Liles	1-year	Re-signing	
September 15, 2005	Wojtek Wolski		Entry-level	
June 1, 2006	Michael Vernace		Entry-level	

== Draft picks ==
Colorado's draft picks at the 2005 NHL entry draft held at the Westin Hotel in Ottawa, Ontario.

Round	#	Player	Nationality	College/Junior/Club team (League)
2	34	Ryan Stoa	United States	US NTDP (NAHL)
2	44	Paul Stastny	United States	University of Denver (WCHA)
2	47	Tom Fritsche	United States	Ohio State University (CCHA)
2	52	Chris Durand	Canada	Seattle Thunderbirds (WHL)
3	88	T. J. Hensick	United States	University of Michigan (CCHA)
4	124	Ray Macias	United States	Kamloops Blazers (WHL)
6	166	Jason Lynch	Canada	Spokane Chiefs (WHL)
6	168	Justin Mercier	United States	US NTDP (NAHL)
7	222	Kyle Cumiskey	Canada	Kelowna Rockets (WHL)

== See also ==
- 2005–06 NHL season
