= Vojtěch Polák =

Czech ice hockey player

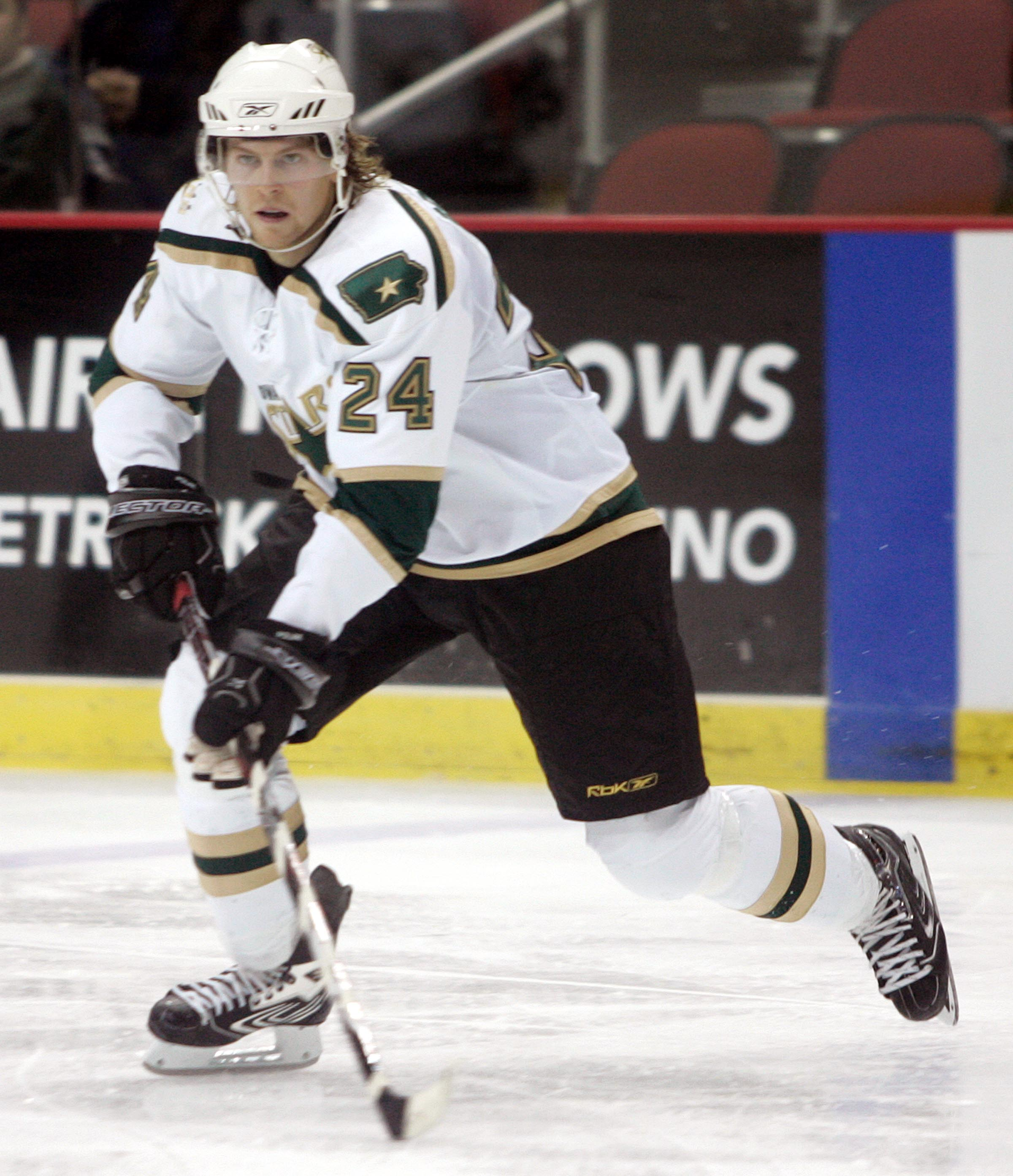
- Polák with the Iowa Stars in 2007
- Born: June 27, 1985 (age 40) Ostrov, Czechoslovakia
- Height: 5 ft 10 in (178 cm)
- Weight: 192 lb (87 kg; 13 st 10 lb)
- Position: Left wing
- Shoots: Left
- Polska Hokej Liga team Former teams: Cracovia Krakow; HC Sparta Praha; HC Dukla Jihlava; Dallas Stars; HC Oceláři Třinec; Kloten Flyers; SCL Tigers; Piráti Chomutov; HC Davos; Dinamo Riga; Ilves; HPK; SaiPa; Severstal Cherepovets; HC Yugra; Admiral Vladivostok; HC Karlovy Vary; HC Vitkovice; AIK IF; HSC Csíkszereda; Sheffield Steelers
- NHL draft: 36th overall, 2003; Dallas Stars
- Playing career: 2001–present

Vojtěch Polák (born June 27, 1985) is a Czech professional ice hockey left wing who is currently playing with Cracovia Krakow in the Polska Hokej Liga.

Polak most recently iced with Sheffield Steelers of the UK Elite Ice Hockey League (EIHL). During the 2005–06 season, he played significant time with the Iowa Stars, the American Hockey League affiliate of the Stars.

== Playing career ==
From the 2000–01 season to the 2004–2005 season, Polák would spend his time in the Czech Extraliga. A vast majority of his games played with HC Energie Karlovy Vary, though he would also play for HC Dukla Jihlava and a single game for HC Sparta Praha. In the 2003 NHL entry draft, the Stars drafted him in the second round with the 36th overall pick.

In 2005, Polák played his first professional game in North America with the Iowa Stars, scoring what would be his first of 12 goals and 34 points with the team. After an impressive preseason with the Stars in September, he made his NHL debut on October 22 against the Calgary Flames. He would dress for three games with the Stars during the 2005–2006 season, going scoreless.

== International play ==
Polák represented the Czech Republic at the 2004 World Junior Ice Hockey Championships.

== Career statistics ==
=== Regular season and playoffs ===
| | | | Regular season | | | | | Playoffs |
| Season | Team | League | GP | G | A | Pts | PIM | GP | G | A | Pts | PIM |
|---|---|---|---|---|---|---|---|---|---|---|---|---|
| 1999–2000 | HC Becherovka Karlovy Vary | CZE U18 | 35 | 8 | 18 | 26 | 40 | — | — | — | — | — |
| 1999–2000 | HC Becherovka Karlovy Vary | CZE U20 | 3 | 0 | 0 | 0 | 0 | — | — | — | — | — |
| 2000–01 | HC Becherovka Karlovy Vary | CZE U18 | 35 | 29 | 26 | 55 | 36 | — | — | — | — | — |
| 2000–01 | HC Becherovka Karlovy Vary | CZE U20 | 3 | 2 | 1 | 3 | 0 | — | — | — | — | — |
| 2000–01 | HC Becherovka Karlovy Vary | ELH | 2 | 0 | 0 | 0 | 0 | — | — | — | — | — |
| 2001–02 | HC Becherovka Karlovy Vary | CZE U18 | 2 | 1 | 2 | 3 | 4 | — | — | — | — | — |
| 2001–02 | HC Becherovka Karlovy Vary | CZE U20 | 34 | 10 | 14 | 24 | 24 | — | — | — | — | — |
| 2001–02 | HC Becherovka Karlovy Vary | ELH | 9 | 1 | 1 | 2 | 2 | — | — | — | — | — |
| 2002–03 | HC Energie Karlovy Vary | CZE U20 | 4 | 2 | 2 | 4 | 18 | — | — | — | — | — |
| 2002–03 | HC Energie Karlovy Vary | ELH | 41 | 7 | 9 | 16 | 51 | — | — | — | — | — |
| 2003–04 | HC Energie Karlovy Vary | CZE U20 | 5 | 8 | 4 | 12 | 2 | — | — | — | — | — |
| 2003–04 | HC Energie Karlovy Vary | ELH | 45 | 1 | 8 | 9 | 42 | — | — | — | — | — |
| 2003–04 | HC Sparta Praha | ELH | 1 | 1 | 0 | 1 | 0 | — | — | — | — | — |
| 2004–05 | HC Energie Karlovy Vary | CZE U20 | 3 | 5 | 5 | 10 | 6 | — | — | — | — | — |
| 2004–05 | HC Energie Karlovy Vary | ELH | 26 | 1 | 5 | 6 | 4 | — | — | — | — | — |
| 2004–05 | HC Dukla Jihlava | CZE U20 | 5 | 4 | 1 | 5 | 6 | — | — | — | — | — |
| 2004–05 | HC Dukla Jihlava | ELH | 16 | 1 | 2 | 3 | 12 | — | — | — | — | — |
| 2004–05 | SK Kadaň | CZE.2 | 7 | 1 | 2 | 3 | 39 | — | — | — | — | — |
| 2005–06 | Dallas Stars | NHL | 3 | 0 | 0 | 0 | 0 | — | — | — | — | — |
| 2005–06 | Iowa Stars | AHL | 60 | 12 | 22 | 34 | 41 | 3 | 0 | 1 | 1 | 0 |
| 2006–07 | Dallas Stars | NHL | 2 | 0 | 0 | 0 | 0 | — | — | — | — | — |
| 2006–07 | Iowa Stars | AHL | 67 | 17 | 28 | 45 | 48 | 7 | 1 | 0 | 1 | 8 |
| 2007–08 | Iowa Stars | AHL | 35 | 6 | 10 | 16 | 8 | — | — | — | — | — |
| 2007–08 | HC Energie Karlovy Vary | ELH | 5 | 1 | 0 | 1 | 4 | 19 | 1 | 3 | 4 | 8 |
| 2008–09 | HC Oceláři Třinec | ELH | 45 | 21 | 13 | 34 | 42 | 5 | 0 | 1 | 1 | 6 |
| 2009–10 | HC Oceláři Třinec | ELH | 49 | 10 | 9 | 19 | 48 | 5 | 0 | 1 | 1 | 0 |
| 2010–11 | HC Oceláři Třinec | ELH | 48 | 15 | 21 | 36 | 30 | 18 | 3 | 4 | 7 | 18 |
| 2011–12 | Kloten Flyers | NLA | 32 | 10 | 9 | 19 | 16 | — | — | — | — | — |
| 2011–12 | SCL Tigers | NLA | 12 | 4 | 4 | 8 | 6 | — | — | — | — | — |
| 2012–13 | Piráti Chomutov | ELH | 11 | 1 | 3 | 4 | 12 | — | — | — | — | — |
| 2012–13 | HC Energie Karlovy Vary | ELH | 16 | 4 | 2 | 6 | 35 | — | — | — | — | — |
| 2012–13 | HC Davos | NLA | 5 | 0 | 1 | 1 | 2 | 2 | 0 | 1 | 1 | 0 |
| 2013–14 | Dinamo Rīga | KHL | 9 | 0 | 3 | 3 | 4 | — | — | — | — | — |
| 2013–14 | HC Oceláři Třinec | ELH | 18 | 7 | 10 | 17 | 12 | 11 | 5 | 2 | 7 | 8 |
| 2014–15 | Ilves | Liiga | 47 | 14 | 23 | 37 | 14 | 2 | 0 | 1 | 1 | 2 |
| 2015–16 | HPK | Liiga | 49 | 10 | 17 | 27 | 22 | — | — | — | — | — |
| 2015–16 | SaiPa | Liiga | 9 | 4 | 2 | 6 | 8 | 3 | 0 | 0 | 0 | 2 |
| 2016–17 | Severstal Cherepovets | KHL | 42 | 9 | 13 | 22 | 30 | — | — | — | — | — |
| 2017–18 | HC Yugra | KHL | 18 | 2 | 4 | 6 | 4 | — | — | — | — | — |
| 2018–19 | Admiral Vladivostok | KHL | 48 | 9 | 6 | 15 | 24 | — | — | — | — | — |
| 2019–20 | HC Energie Karlovy Vary | ELH | 38 | 9 | 12 | 21 | 22 | 2 | 1 | 1 | 2 | 2 |
| 2020–21 | HC Vítkovice Ridera | ELH | 11 | 0 | 1 | 1 | 6 | — | — | — | — | — |
| 2020–21 | AIK | Allsv | 10 | 0 | 1 | 1 | 6 | 6 | 0 | 0 | 0 | 0 |
| 2021–22 | HSC Csíkszereda | EL | 10 | 4 | 9 | 13 | 8 | — | — | — | — | — |
| 2021–22 | HSC Csíkszereda | ROU | 8 | 5 | 6 | 11 | 6 | — | — | — | — | — |
| 2021–22 | Sheffield Steelers | EIHL | 32 | 12 | 28 | 40 | 20 | — | — | — | — | — |
| ELH totals | | | 381 | 83 | 93 | 176 | 322 | 60 | 10 | 12 | 22 | 42 |
| NHL totals | | | 5 | 0 | 0 | 0 | 0 | — | — | — | — | — |
| KHL totals | | | 117 | 20 | 26 | 46 | 62 | — | — | — | — | — |

=== International ===
| Year | Team | Event | GP | G | A | Pts | PIM |
|---|---|---|---|---|---|---|---|
| 2002 | Czech Republic | U17 | 5 | 6 | 6 | 12 | 12 |
| 2003 | Czech Republic | WJC18 | 6 | 3 | 2 | 5 | 18 |
| 2004 | Czech Republic | WJC | 6 | 1 | 0 | 1 | 4 |
| Junior totals | | | 17 | 10 | 8 | 18 | 34 |
