= Griggs (surname) =

Griggs is an English surname. Notable people with the surname include:

- Acie Griggs (1923–2007), American baseball player
- Alexander Griggs (1838–1903), American steamboat captain and politician
- Alice Maynard Griggs (1859–1939), American journalist, composer, artist
- Andy Griggs (born 1973), American country music artist
- Anthony Griggs (born 1960), American former football player
- Art Griggs (1883–1938), American baseball player
- Benjamin Griggs (1690–1768), settler of Griggstown, New Jersey
- Bevan Griggs (born 1978), New Zealand cricketer
- Bill Griggs (born 1950s), Australian surgeon and inventor
- Billy Griggs (American football) (born 1962), American football player
- Chauncey Wright Griggs (1832–1910), American businessman and politician
- Clark Robinson Griggs (1824–1915), American politician, mayor of Urbana, Illinois
- C. Wilfred Griggs (born 1942), American professor of ancient scripture and Egyptologist
- David Griggs (disambiguation)
- Debbie Griggs (1964–1999), British murder victim
- Francella Mary Griggs (1920–2012), Native American activist and nun
- Frederick Landseer Griggs (1876–1938), English etcher and artist
- George Griggs, American composer
- George S. Griggs (1805–1870), American railroad master mechanic
- Hal Griggs (disambiguation)
- Hezekiah Griggs (1988–2016), American entrepreneur, philanthropist, and investor
- Hubert E. Griggs (1906–1964), American politician
- Ian Griggs (1928–2021), Anglican Bishop of Ludlow
- Ione Quinby Griggs (1891–1991), American journalist and columnist
- James M. Griggs (1861–1910), American politician
- Johanna Griggs (born 1973), Australian swimmer and television presenter
- John Griggs (disambiguation)
- Judith Griggs (born 1959), Australian lawyer and business executive
- Kate Griggs, British social entrepreneur
- Katie Griggs (1979–2021), American yoga teacher, podcaster, author, businesswoman, and conspiracy theorist
- Laurel Griggs (2006–2019), American stage and television actress
- Les Griggs (1914–1990), Australian rules footballer
- Loyal Griggs (1906–1978), American cinematographer
- Martha Griggs (born 1953), Canadian equestrian
- Max Griggs (1938–2021), British businessman
- Natasha Griggs (born 1969), Australian politician
- Nathaniel M. Griggs (1857–1919), American politician
- Nick Griggs (born 2004), Irish athlete
- Nigel Griggs (born 1949), British musician, brother of Paul Griggs
- Orrin Harold Griggs (1883–1958), American lawyer and politician
- Parker Griggs, American musician, singer-songwriter, and record producer
- Paul Griggs (born 1944), British musician, brother of Nigel Griggs
- Perry Griggs (born 1954), American former football player
- Peter Griggs (1849–1920), English politician
- Phil Griggs (1918–1980), English footballer
- Ray Griggs (born 1961), Australian naval officer and public servant
- Ray Griggs (director) (born 1974), American director, writer and producer
- Richard Griggs (c. 1840–1883), American politician and author
- Sir Robert Charles Griggs (born 1936), American country and jazz musician
- Robert Fiske Griggs (1881–1962), American botanist and ecologist
- Robyn Griggs (1973–2022), American actress
- Ron Griggs (born 1952), American politician
- S. David Griggs (1939–1989), United States Navy officer and NASA astronaut
- Steve Griggs, Canadian sports executive
- Sutton E. Griggs (1872–1933), American author, Baptist minister, and social activist
- Ted Griggs (born 1960), American businessman
- Terry Griggs, Canadian author
- Thomas C. Griggs (1845–1903), Latter-day Saint director and hymnwriter
- Walter Griggs (1888–1933), English jockey
- Wiley Griggs (1925–1996), American baseball player, brother of Acie Griggs
- Wilfred E. Griggs (1866–1918), American architect
- William Griggs (disambiguation)
