= 2020 Stanley Cup Final =

2020 ice hockey championship series

	1	2	3	4	5	6	Total
Dallas Stars	4	2	2	4*	3**	0	2
Tampa Bay Lightning	1	3	5	5*	2**	2	4
- * – Denotes overtime period(s)
- Location(s): Edmonton: Rogers Place
- Coaches: Dallas: Rick Bowness (interim); Tampa Bay: Jon Cooper
- Captains: Dallas: Jamie Benn; Tampa Bay: Steven Stamkos
- Referees: Francis Charron (1, 4); Steve Kozari (2, 5); Wes McCauley (1, 3, 6); Dan O'Rourke (3, 5); Kelly Sutherland (2, 4, 6)
- Dates: September 19–28, 2020
- MVP: Victor Hedman (Lightning)
- Series-winning goal: Brayden Point (12:23, first)
- Networks: Canada: (English): CBC/Sportsnet (French): TVA Sports; United States: (English): NBC (1, 4–6), NBCSN (2–3)
- Announcers: (CBC/SN) Jim Hughson and Craig Simpson (TVA) Felix Seguin and Patrick Lalime (NBC/NBCSN) Mike Emrick, Eddie Olczyk, Brian Boucher, and Pierre McGuire

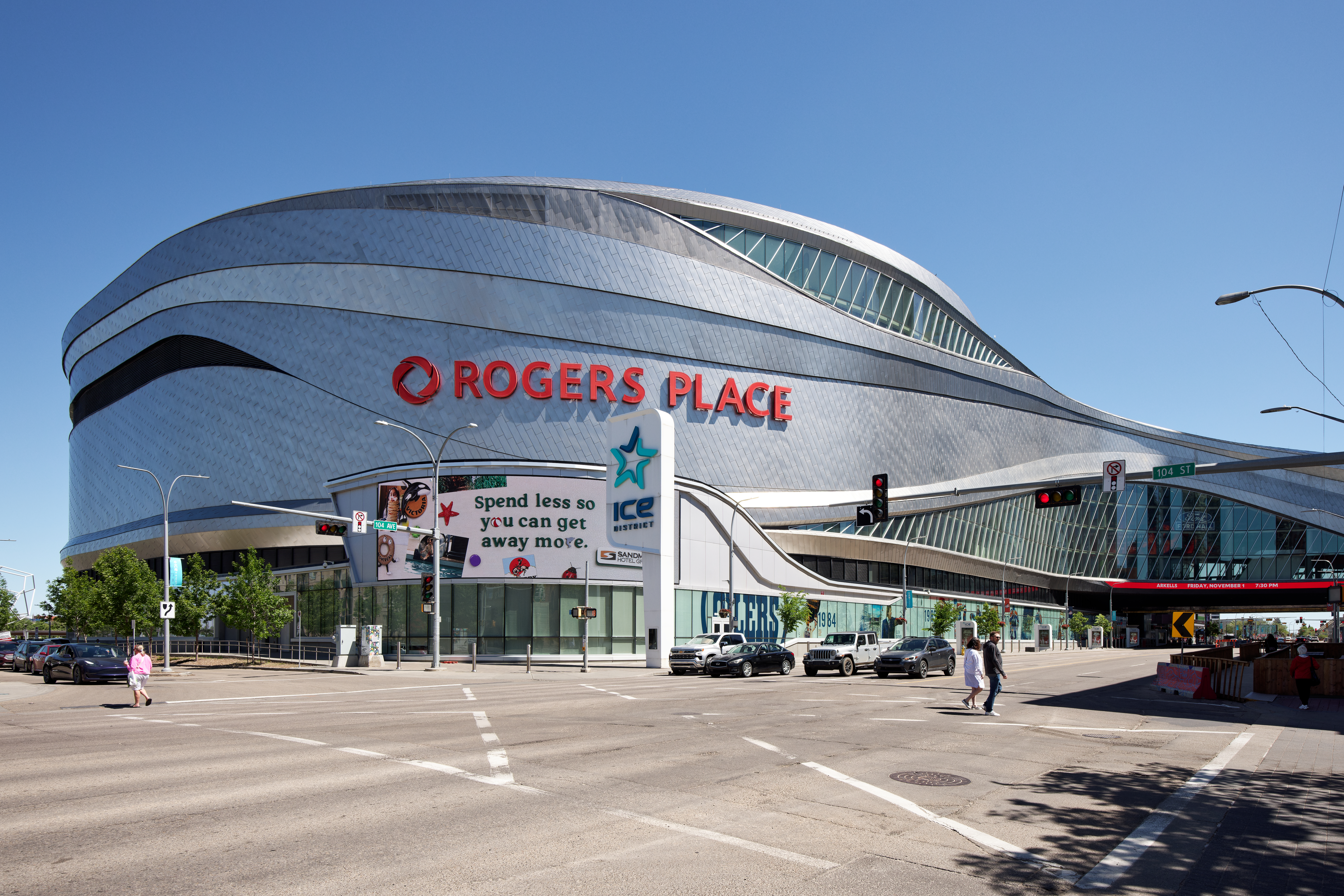
Due to the COVID-19 pandemic, the entire series was held at Rogers Place in Edmonton.

The 2020 Stanley Cup Final was the championship series of the National Hockey League's (NHL) 2019–20 season and the culmination of the 2020 Stanley Cup playoffs. This series was between the Eastern Conference champion Tampa Bay Lightning and the Western Conference champion Dallas Stars. The Lightning won the best-of-seven series, four games to two, for their second championship in franchise history. The Lightning had home-ice advantage in the series with the better regular season record. The series began on September 19 and concluded on September 28. Due to the COVID-19 pandemic, the entire series was played behind closed doors at Rogers Place in Edmonton. The pandemic resulted in the league suspending the regular season on March 12, 2020, and then scheduling a special 24-team playoff format to be held in two neutral "hub cities" (Edmonton and Toronto) that began on August 1. Thus it became the first Stanley Cup Final to be played in the month of September.

This was the first Stanley Cup Final since 1925 to be played entirely outside the Eastern Time Zone, the first since 1928 to be played entirely in one location, the first since 1989 to be played entirely in Canada, and the first since 2011 to have the Stanley Cup awarded in a Canadian arena. This was the first Stanley Cup Final since 1950 to feature a neutral site game and the first Stanley Cup Final to feature two teams from the American Sun Belt (Texas and Florida).

The Dallas Stars set the record for most playoff games played by a team in a single postseason at 27 games.

== Paths to the Final ==
=== Return to play ===
On March 11, 2020, the World Health Organization declared COVID-19 to be a pandemic, and later that day, the National Basketball Association suspended all games after players tested positive for the virus. One day later, the NHL announced that the 2019–20 season had been paused indefinitely. On May 22, the league and the NHLPA agreed on a basic framework to stage a 24-team playoff tournament behind closed doors, conducted in two neutral "hub" cities to help protect teams from the virus. The details of the plan were announced publicly on May 26. The seeds would be based on each club's points percentage when the season paused on March 12, effectively scrapping the remainder of the regular season. In the opening round of the 24-team playoff format, the top four teams in each conference played each other in a separate seeding round-robin to determine the seeding in the first round. The eight lower seeded teams in each conference played in the qualifying round, a best-of-five series to advance to the next round. The first round through to the Cup Final remained as best-of-seven series. On July 10, along with the ratification of an extension to the collective bargaining agreement, the NHL and the NHLPA formally agreed to begin the playoffs on August 1 (concluding no later than early October), with games being hosted by Edmonton (Western Conference early rounds, conference finals, and Stanley Cup Final) and Toronto (Eastern Conference early rounds). U.S. cities were also considered, but were passed over after several U.S. states experienced a spike in COVID-19 cases in late June.

=== Dallas Stars ===
This was the franchise's fifth appearance in the Final. They won the Stanley Cup in 1999 before losing the Final in 2000. They also made two appearances as the Minnesota North Stars in 1981 and 1991.

During the offseason, Dallas signed forwards Corey Perry and Joe Pavelski as well as defenceman Andrej Sekera in free agency. The team also re-signed defenceman Taylor Fedun and forward Jason Dickinson. The team made no trades during the regular season.

On December 10, 2019, head coach Jim Montgomery was dismissed due to "unprofessional conduct inconsistent with the core values and beliefs" of both the team and the league, and was replaced by Rick Bowness. Before joining the Stars organization, Bowness had served as associate coach with the Lightning from 2013 to 2018.

When the regular season was suspended on March 12, 2020, the Stars had a 37–24–8 record and a .594 points percentage to finish third in the Central Division and fourth in the Western Conference. After play resumed in the hubs, Dallas placed third in the round robin. The Stars then defeated the Calgary Flames in six games in the first round, the Colorado Avalanche in seven games in the second round, and the Vegas Golden Knights in five games in the Western Conference finals.

=== Tampa Bay Lightning ===
This was the Tampa Bay Lightning's third appearance in the Final. They won the Stanley Cup in 2004 before losing the Final in 2015.

During the offseason, Backup goaltender Louis Domingue was dealt to the New Jersey Devils for a conditional seventh-round draft pick in 2021. Defenseman Anton Stralman left the team in free agency after five seasons and signed a three-year contract with the inne-state rival Florida Panthers. Right winger Ryan Callahan's career was effectively ended when he was diagnosed with a degenerative back disease. Defenseman Dan Girardi went unsigned over the summer and eventually announced his retirement from playing hockey effective immediately after his two-year contract he signed in 2017. To make up for these losses, Tampa Bay signed goaltender Curtis McElhinney, defencemen Luke Schenn, Luke Witkowski, and Kevin Shattenkirk, and forward Patrick Maroon during free agency. Tampa Bay also re-signed goaltender Andrei Vasilevskiy and forwards Cedric Paquette and Brayden Point. During the regular season, the Lightning traded for forwards Blake Coleman and Barclay Goodrow. They also signed Zach Bogosian whose contract had been terminated by the Buffalo Sabres during the season. During Phase 2 of the Return to Play plan, captain Steven Stamkos injured himself while skating, and subsequently missed the round robin and the first three rounds of the playoffs for the Lightning.

When the regular season was suspended on March 12, the Lightning had a 42–21–6 record and a .657 points percentage to finish second in both the Atlantic Division and the Eastern Conference. After play resumed in the hubs, Tampa Bay placed second in the round robin. The Lightning then defeated the Columbus Blue Jackets in the first round, including winning game one of the series that became the fourth longest game in NHL history, and the Presidents' Trophy-winning Boston Bruins in the second round in five games respectively. The Lightning then eliminated the New York Islanders in the Eastern Conference finals in six games.

== Game summaries ==
Note: The numbers in parentheses represent each player's total goals or assists to that point of the entire playoffs.

=== Game one ===
September 19	Dallas Stars	4–1	Tampa Bay Lightning	Rogers Place	Recap

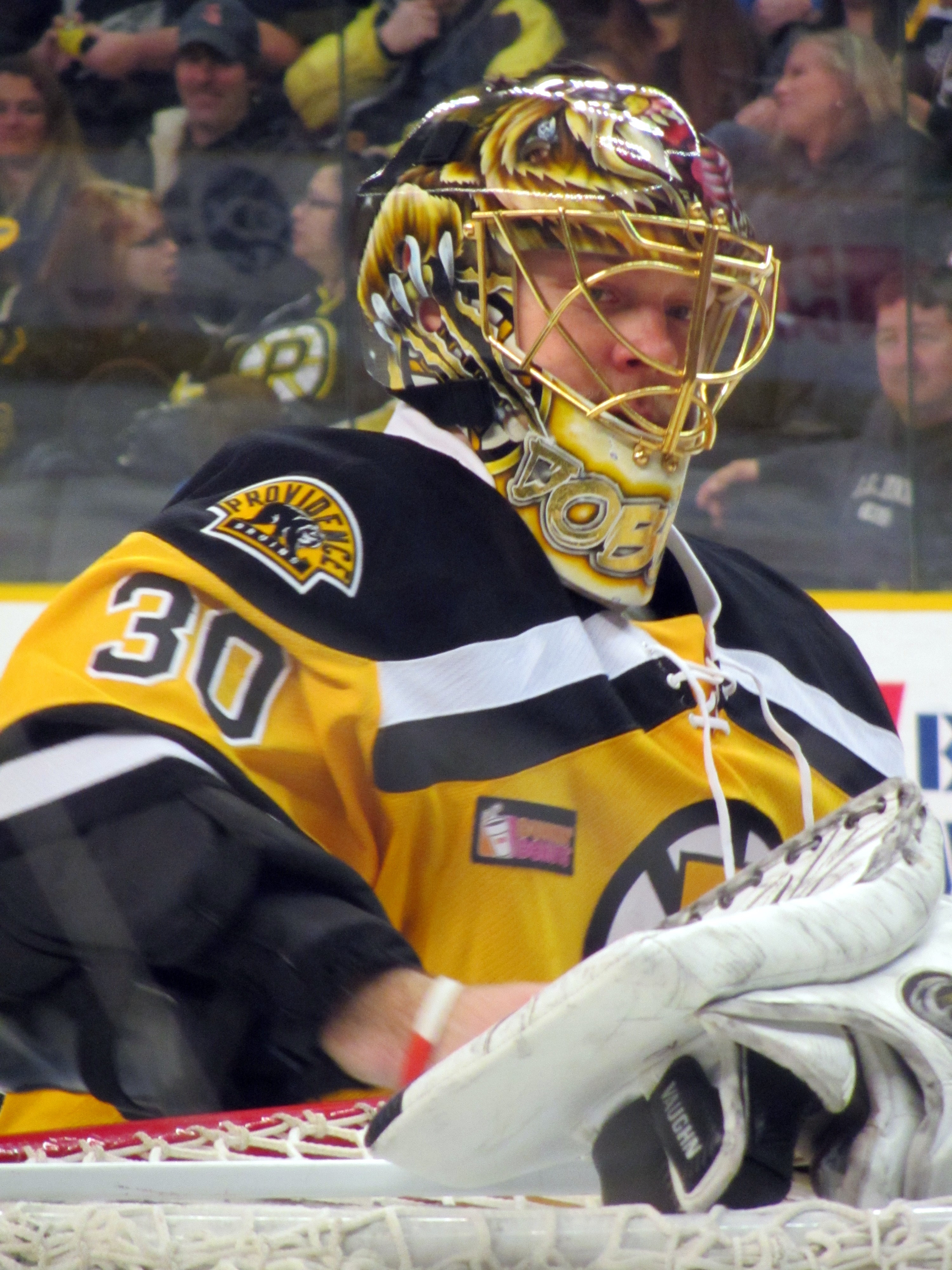
Anton Khudobin, shown with Providence, stopped 35 of 36 shots in game one.

In the first period of game one, neither team produced many shots, yet each scored a goal. The first goal came from Stars defenceman Joel Hanley who took an open pass from Roope Hintz. Tampa Bay equalized the score on left winger Yanni Gourde's skate deflection. In the second period, both teams produced more shots, however, Dallas was up by two at the end of the period. Jamie Oleksiak fired a wrist shot which rebounded back to him which he then shot it over Lightning goalie Andrei Vasilevskiy to make it 2–1. The Stars' third goal started in their own end with Esa Lindell passing to Joel Kiviranta. Kiviranta then skated through centre, firing a shot that was blocked, but picked up the rebound to put it past Vasilevskiy for a 3–1 lead. In the third period, the Stars played more defensively, putting up only two shots compared to the Lightning who fired twenty-two shots at Anton Khudobin. The Stars held their ground for the remaining 20 minutes, and Jason Dickinson's empty-net goal sealed a 4–1 victory for Dallas.

Scoring summary
Period	Team	Goal	Assist(s)	Time	Score
1st	DAL	Joel Hanley (1)	Roope Hintz (10)	05:40	1–0 DAL
1st	TBL	Yanni Gourde (6)	Blake Coleman (7), Barclay Goodrow (5)	12:32	1–1
2nd	DAL	Jamie Oleksiak (5)	Alexander Radulov (7), Miro Heiskanen (18)	12:30	2–1 DAL
2nd	DAL	Joel Kiviranta (5)	Esa Lindell (6), John Klingberg (14)	19:32	3–1 DAL
3rd	DAL	Jason Dickinson (1) – en	Blake Comeau (5), Mattias Janmark (6)	18:42	4–1 DAL
Penalty summary
Period	Team	Player	Penalty	Time	PIM
1st	TBL	Patrick Maroon	Roughing	08:08	2:00
1st	DAL	Jamie Oleksiak	Roughing	08:08	2:00
2nd	TBL	Blake Coleman	Slashing	01:09	2:00
2nd	TBL	Blake Coleman	Hooking	06:54	2:00
2nd	TBL	Patrick Maroon	Misconduct	20:00	10:00
3rd	DAL	John Klingberg	Hooking	04:52	2:00
3rd	DAL	Blake Comeau	Delay of game (puck over glass)	09:08	2:00
3rd	DAL	Tyler Seguin	Tripping	12:56	2:00

Shots by period
Team	1	2	3	Total
DAL	5	13	2	20
TBL	4	10	22	36

=== Game two ===
September 21	Dallas Stars	2–3	Tampa Bay Lightning	Rogers Place	Recap

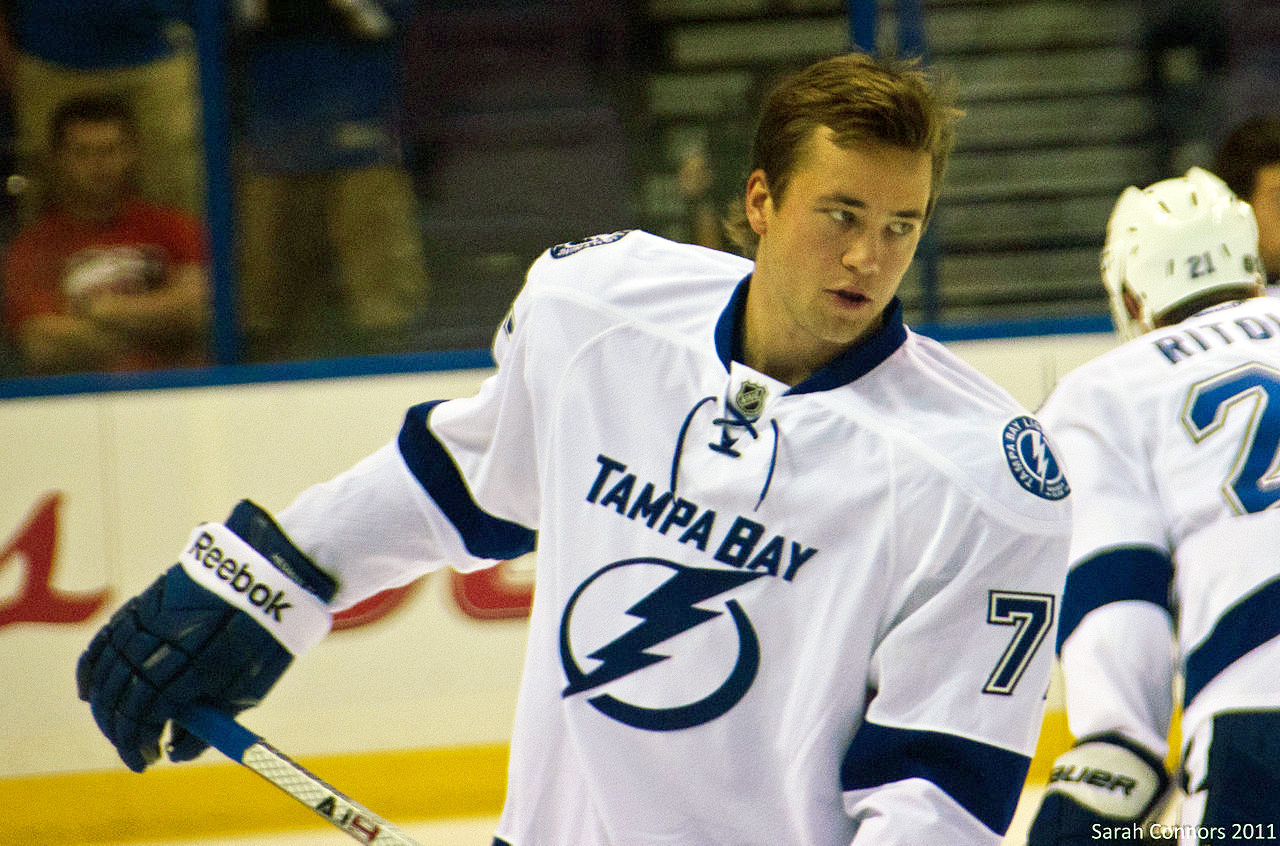
Victor Hedman recorded two assists on the power-play in Game 2.

In game two, the Lightning struck three times in the first period. Twice on the power-play, Victor Hedman and Nikita Kucherov set up both goal-scorers. The first came from a tic-tac-toe pass to Brayden Point firing it past Stars goalie Anton Khudobin. The second goal was another set-up pass; this time Kucherov fed it through the middle where Ondrej Palat made it 2–0. The Lightning made it 3–0 when the Stars fumbled the puck in their own zone and Anthony Cirelli gave it to Kevin Shattenkirk, whose shot at the blue line deflected off Esa Lindell and past Khudobin. In the second period, the Stars shot eighteen times at Andrei Vasilevskiy and caught a break on the power-play. During Palat's slashing penalty, John Klingberg's shot deflected off fellow Stars forward Joe Pavelski to cut the score to 3–1. Later in the period, a hit on Stars player Blake Comeau caused a skirmish to erupt, with Dallas players Corey Perry and Klingberg against Cedric Paquette and Hedman respectively. All players received simultaneous roughing penalties. In the third period, the Stars made it 3–2 when Mattias Janmark's shot snuck past Vasilevskiy. The Lightning kept their offense going in the final 20 minutes, pouring twelve shots on Khudobin, holding off the Stars, and ending the game 3–2 to tie the series 1–1.

Scoring summary
Period	Team	Goal	Assist(s)	Time	Score
1st	TBL	Brayden Point (10) – pp	Nikita Kucherov (21), Victor Hedman (7)	11:23	1–0 TBL
1st	TBL	Ondrej Palat (9) – pp	Nikita Kucherov (22), Victor Hedman (8)	14:22	2–0 TBL
1st	TBL	Kevin Shattenkirk (2)	Blake Coleman (8), Anthony Cirelli (4)	15:16	3–0 TBL
2nd	DAL	Joe Pavelski (10) – pp	John Klingberg (15), Alexander Radulov (8)	14:43	3–1 TBL
3rd	DAL	Mattias Janmark (1)	John Klingberg (16), Alexander Radulov (9)	05:27	3–2 TBL
Penalty summary
Period	Team	Player	Penalty	Time	PIM
1st	DAL	Mattias Janmark	High-sticking	03:20	2:00
1st	DAL	Joe Pavelski	Tripping	10:58	2:00
1st	DAL	Jamie Oleksiak	Holding	13:11	2:00
1st	TBL	Ondrej Palat	Interference	18:59	2:00
2nd	DAL	Blake Comeau	Interference	02:02	2:00
2nd	TBL	Nikita Kucherov	Tripping	03:47	2:00
2nd	TBL	Yanni Gourde	Cross checking	06:26	2:00
2nd	TBL	Ondrej Palat	Slashing	14:38	2:00
2nd	DAL	Corey Perry	Roughing	16:58	2:00
2nd	TBL	Patrick Maroon	Goaltender interference	16:58	2:00
2nd	TBL	Victor Hedman	Roughing	16:58	2:00
2nd	TBL	Cedric Paquette	Roughing	16:58	2:00
2nd	DAL	John Klingberg	Roughing	16:58	2:00
3rd	None				

Shots by period
Team	1	2	3	Total
DAL	6	18	5	29
TBL	14	5	12	31

=== Game three ===
September 23	Tampa Bay Lightning	5–2	Dallas Stars	Rogers Place	Recap

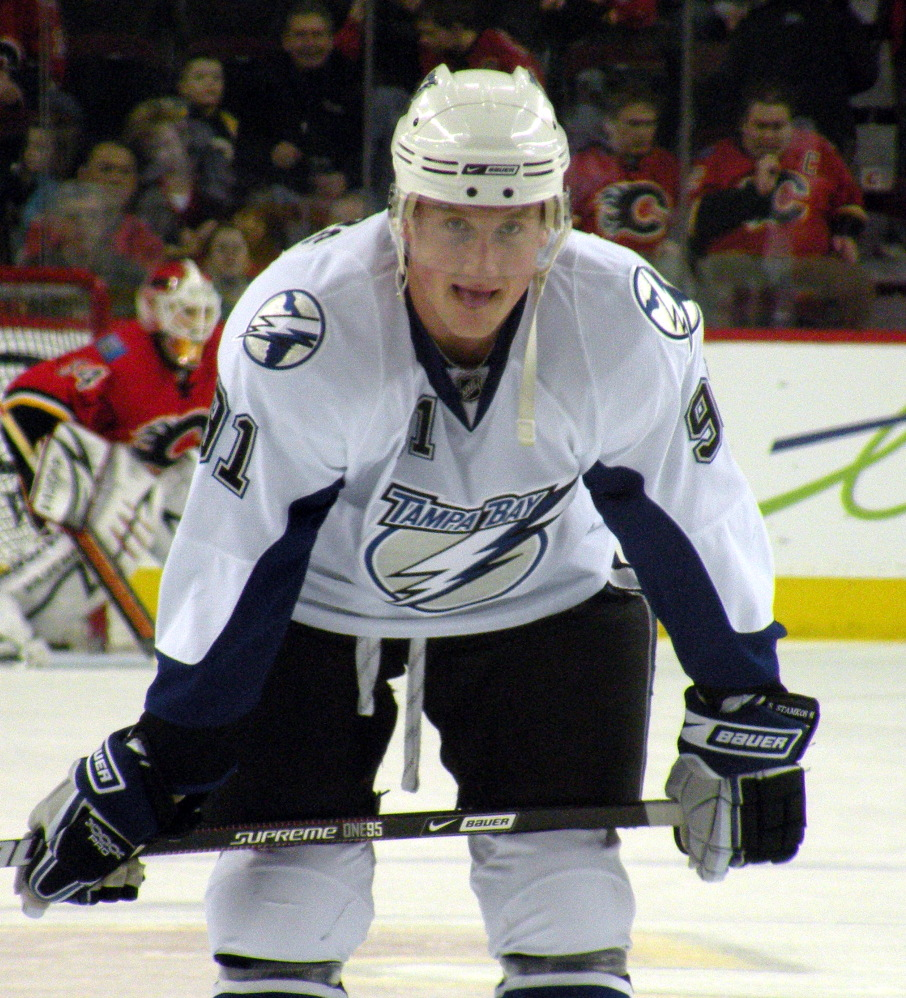
Steven Stamkos, who returned to the Lightning lineup in Game 3, scored his first goal of the playoffs.

In game three, Dallas put the heat on Andrei Vasilevskiy in the first period. However, among their sixteen shots, only one goal was successfully scored compared to the Lightning's two. Tampa Bay's first came from a misplay by Miro Heiskanen giving Nikita Kucherov a breakaway, sniping the puck past Anton Khudobin. Their second goal came from their captain Steven Stamkos returning from injury for his first game since being injured on February 25. After a rush by the Stars was stopped in the offensive zone, Victor Hedman passed the puck to Stamkos, who was racing on the right side, upon which he fired his shot over Khudobin's blocker to make it 2–0. It was Stamkos's only shot on goal of the series (and of the entire postseason), as he did not take to the ice again following the end of the first period. The Stars' lone goal of the period came short-handed when a shot by Roope Hintz was stopped by Vasilevskiy. The rebound of that save went back to Hintz in the left corner who then passed to an open Jason Dickinson, whose shot got through Vasilevskiy to make it 2–1.

The Lightning had a more dominant approach in the second period, scoring three times with 21 shots on goal. The first goal came following Alexander Radulov's hooking penalty which carried over from the first period. After a puck battle behind the net, Anthony Cirelli, who was falling down on the play, passed to Hedman who shot the puck under Khudobin's stick into the net. Tampa Bay's fourth goal arrived when the Stars began a line change and a 3-on-1 developed with Kucherov leading the rush and Brayden Point scoring the goal. The Lightning continued their offensive zone coverage towards the end of the period and in the final minute-and-a-half, Point fired a shot that rebounded to Ondrej Palat, who put it into the net for a 5–1 lead. Dallas then pulled Khudobin before the third period, replacing him with rookie Jake Oettinger. The Stars, showing some frustration, began roughing the Lightning on three occasions: the first with Mattias Janmark and Palat; then both Jamie Benn and Jan Rutta, who had a skirmish after the play, both earning misconducts as a result; and an errant cross-check at 18:05 by Joe Pavelski on Cedric Paquette, which caused a ruckus with both teams. Heiskanen's goal gave the Stars some life in the third period, but Tampa Bay's defense kept the Stars at bay, winning the game 5–2 and taking a 2–1 series lead.

Scoring summary
Period	Team	Goal	Assist(s)	Time	Score
1st	TBL	Nikita Kucherov (7)	Unassisted	05:33	1–0 TBL
1st	TBL	Steven Stamkos (1)	Victor Hedman (9), Jan Rutta (1)	06:58	2–0 TBL
1st	DAL	Jason Dickinson (2) – sh	Roope Hintz (11)	11:19	2–1 TBL
2nd	TBL	Victor Hedman (10) – pp	Anthony Cirelli (5), Ondrej Palat (6)	00:54	3–1 TBL
2nd	TBL	Brayden Point (11)	Nikita Kucherov (23), Victor Hedman (10)	12:02	4–1 TBL
2nd	TBL	Ondrej Palat (10)	Brayden Point (17), Kevin Shattenkirk (9)	18:55	5–1 TBL
3rd	DAL	Miro Heiskanen (6)	Joe Pavelski (6), Andrew Cogliano (2)	06:49	5–2 TBL
Penalty summary
Period	Team	Player	Penalty	Time	PIM
1st	TBL	Erik Cernak	Tripping	08:13	2:00
1st	DAL	Joel Kiviranta	Interference	09:34	2:00
1st	DAL	Alexander Radulov	Hooking	19:37	2:00
2nd	DAL	Alexander Radulov	Hooking	04:31	2:00
2nd	TBL	Yanni Gourde	Interference	12:43	2:00
3rd	TBL	Ondrej Palat	Roughing	02:58	2:00
3rd	DAL	Mattias Janmark	Roughing	02:58	2:00
3rd	DAL	Jamie Benn	Roughing	03:38	2:00
3rd	TBL	Jan Rutta	Roughing	03:38	2:00
3rd	DAL	Jamie Benn	Misconduct	03:38	10:00
3rd	TBL	Jan Rutta	Misconduct	03:38	10:00
3rd	TBL	Kevin Shattenkirk	Slashing	09:30	2:00
3rd	TBL	Mikhail Sergachev	Tripping	12:41	2:00
3rd	DAL	Joe Pavelski	Roughing	18:05	2:00
3rd	DAL	Joe Pavelski	Cross checking	18:05	2:00
3rd	TBL	Cedric Paquette	Roughing	18:05	2:00
3rd	TBL	Barclay Goodrow	Roughing	18:05	2:00
3rd	TBL	Patrick Maroon	Misconduct	18:05	10:00
3rd	DAL	Jason Dickinson	Roughing	18:05	2:00

Shots by period
Team	1	2	3	Total
TBL	8	21	3	32
DAL	16	4	4	24

=== Game four ===
September 25	Tampa Bay Lightning	5–4	OT	Dallas Stars	Rogers Place	Recap

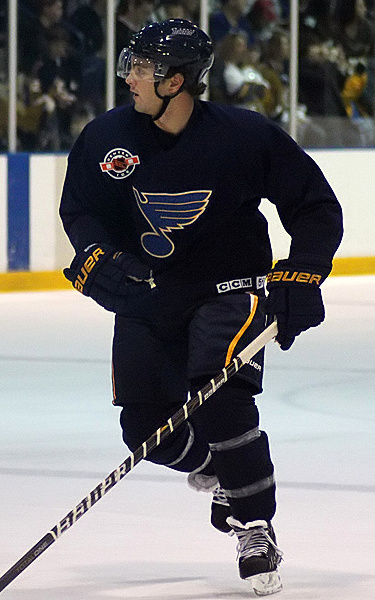
Kevin Shattenkirk, shown with St. Louis, scored the game-winning goal in overtime of Game 4.

The Tampa Bay Lightning overcame a 2–0 deficit in game four. In the first period, John Klingberg gave the Stars their first goal of the game subsequently on their first shot. The Stars gained a 2–0 lead when Jamie Benn set up Joe Pavelski, whose wrist shot got under Andrei Vasilevskiy. Tampa Bay got on the board with 33 seconds remaining in the period. The play began when defenceman Kevin Shattenkirk, from behind the Lightning net, gave an outstretched pass to Ondrej Palat, who then passed across to the right boards to find a solitary Brayden Point. He maneuvered around Anton Khudobin, going to his backhand to score. Point then tied the game early in the second period, on the power-play. During the Stars' penalty, Alex Killorn made a pass to the front, but the puck deflected off Andrej Sekera's skate into the air, which Point then batted it into the net. The Stars soon regained the lead when Tyler Seguin's pass around Vasilevskiy got picked up by Corey Perry who, although tied up by Cedric Paquette, allowed the puck to trickle in off his stick. The Lightning tied the game up again when Andrew Cogliano got caught for hooking and on the ensuing Tampa Bay power-play, Mikhail Sergachev set up Nikita Kucherov for a one-timer, but the puck deflected off Esa Lindell to Yanni Gourde who shot it past Khudobin. In the third period, Killorn put the Lightning up 4–3 when he went out around the net and shot at the top corner behind Khudobin. Pavelski tied the game 4–4 after picking up the rebound of Seguin's shot and then launching the puck at Vasilevskiy which deflected off Shattenkirk into the net. Into overtime, Benn pushed down Tyler Johnson; controversially, he was called for tripping. While on the ensuing power-play, Patrick Maroon won an offensive zone face-off, sending it back to Victor Hedman. Hedman then passed it to Shattenkirk, whose shot at a sharp angle went over Khudobin's right pad for the game-winning goal and a 3–1 series lead.

Scoring summary
Period	Team	Goal	Assist(s)	Time	Score
1st	DAL	John Klingberg (4)	Esa Lindell (7)	07:17	1–0 DAL
1st	DAL	Joe Pavelski (11)	Jamie Benn (11), Alexander Radulov (10)	18:28	2–0 DAL
1st	TBL	Brayden Point (12)	Ondrej Palat (7), Kevin Shattenkirk (10)	19:27	2–1 DAL
2nd	TBL	Brayden Point (13) – pp	Alex Killorn (5), Nikita Kucherov (24)	02:08	2–2
2nd	DAL	Corey Perry (3)	Tyler Seguin (7), Mattias Janmark (7)	08:26	3–2 DAL
2nd	TBL	Yanni Gourde (7) – pp	Nikita Kucherov (25), Mikhail Sergachev (6)	18:54	3–3
3rd	TBL	Alex Killorn (5)	Mikhail Sergachev (7), Anthony Cirelli (6)	06:41	4–3 TBL
3rd	DAL	Joe Pavelski (12)	Tyler Seguin (8), Miro Heiskanen (19)	11:35	4–4
OT	TBL	Kevin Shattenkirk (3) – pp	Victor Hedman (11), Patrick Maroon (4)	06:34	5–4 TBL
Penalty summary
Period	Team	Player	Penalty	Time	PIM
1st	DAL	Jamie Oleksiak	Hooking	13:52	2:00
2nd	DAL	Jamie Oleksiak	Tripping	01:38	2:00
2nd	TBL	Erik Cernak	Holding	11:10	2:00
2nd	DAL	Andrew Cogliano	Hooking	17:34	2:00
3rd	TBL	Patrick Maroon	Holding	09:16	2:00
3rd	DAL	Corey Perry	Interference	19:31	2:00
3rd	TBL	Brayden Point	Embellishment	19:31	2:00
OT	TBL	Mikhail Sergachev	Holding	00:37	2:00
OT	DAL	Jamie Benn	Tripping	05:10	2:00

Shots by period
Team	1	2	3	OT	Total
TBL	8	15	8	4	35
DAL	3	14	11	2	30

=== Game five ===
September 26	Dallas Stars	3–2	2OT	Tampa Bay Lightning	Rogers Place	Recap

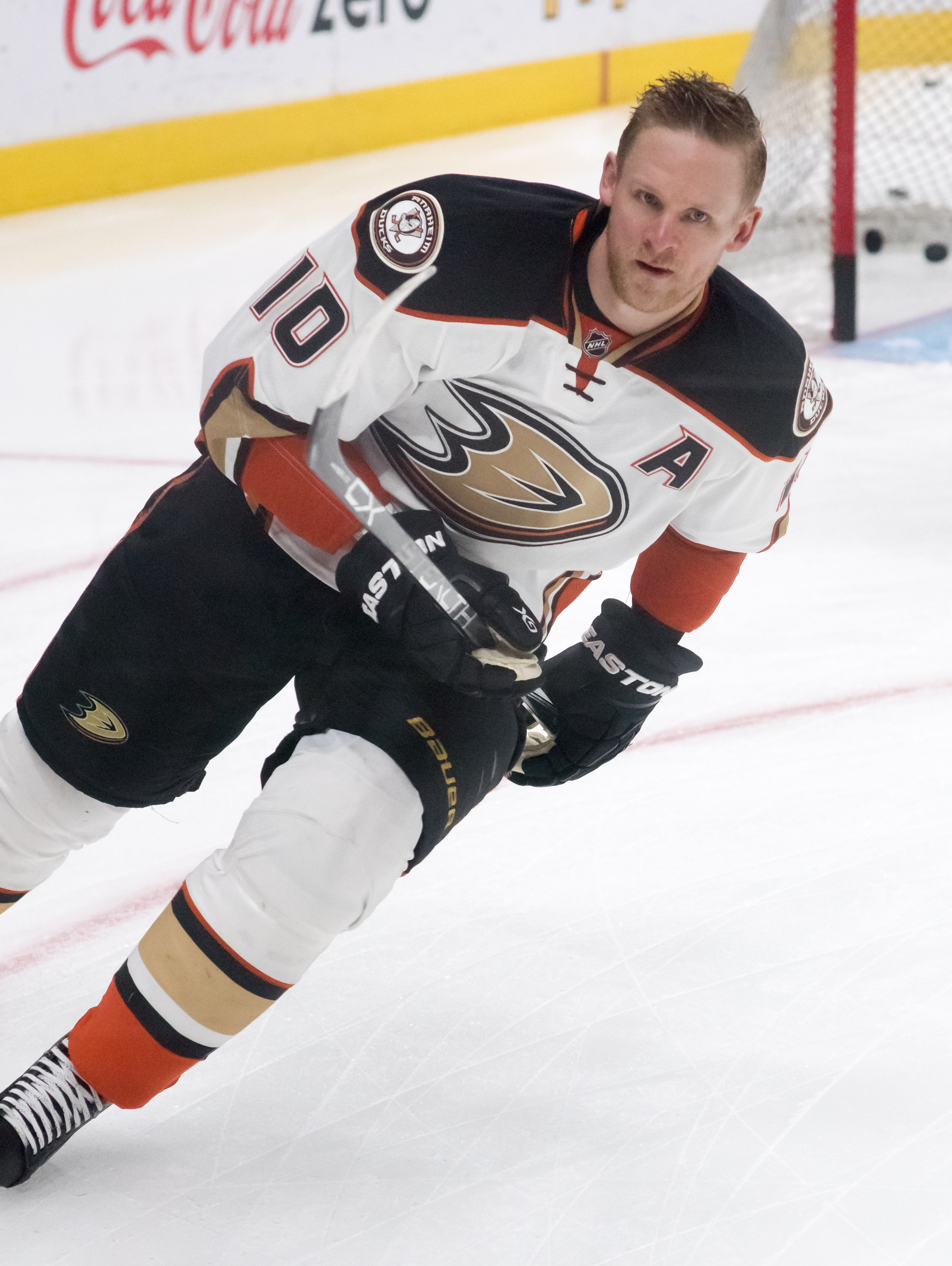
Corey Perry, shown with Anaheim, scored twice, including the game-winning goal in double overtime of Game 5.

Corey Perry opened the scoring in the first period of game five. Jamie Oleksiak passed to Tyler Seguin, who then dropped it for Perry to score the initial goal for Dallas. In the second period, the Lightning struck back when Nikita Kucherov passed to Ondrej Palat and he skated past the Dallas defencemen and goaltender Anton Khudobin with a backhand to tie the game 1–1. The Lightning kept putting the pressure on the Stars for the remainder of the second period, firing away 13 shots. In the third period, Mikhail Sergachev's blast from the point gave the Lightning a 2–1 lead. The Stars tied the game 2–2 when Miro Heiskanen's shot from the point rebounded to Joe Pavelski, who put it past Andrei Vasilevskiy to break the record held by Joe Mullen for most career playoff goals scored by a US-born player. The two teams remained tied after the fact heading into overtime. In the first overtime, Dallas put up two shots compared to Tampa Bay's seven, but no goals were scored and the game continued on to double overtime. At 9:23 of the second overtime, Perry picked up a rebound from Seguin's shot and slid the puck past Vasilevskiy to give the Stars the game 3–2, forcing a sixth game.

Scoring summary
Period	Team	Goal	Assist(s)	Time	Score
1st	DAL	Corey Perry (4)	Tyler Seguin (9), Jamie Oleksiak (4)	17:52	1–0 DAL
2nd	TBL	Ondrej Palat (11)	Nikita Kucherov (26), Brayden Point (18)	04:37	1–1
3rd	TBL	Mikhail Sergachev (3)	Brayden Point (19)	03:38	2–1 TBL
3rd	DAL	Joe Pavelski (13)	Miro Heiskanen (20), Tyler Seguin (10)	13:15	2–2
OT	None				
2OT	DAL	Corey Perry (5)	John Klingberg (17), Tyler Seguin (11)	09:23	3–2 DAL
Penalty summary
Period	Team	Player	Penalty	Time	PIM
1st	DAL	Tyler Seguin	High-sticking	04:19	2:00
2nd	TBL	Carter Verhaeghe	Slashing	12:33	2:00
3rd	TBL	Erik Cernak	High-sticking	11:06	2:00
OT	None				
2OT	None				

Shots by period
Team	1	2	3	OT	2OT	Total
DAL	8	6	13	2	4	33
TBL	10	13	7	7	4	41

=== Game six ===
September 28	Tampa Bay Lightning	2–0	Dallas Stars	Rogers Place	Recap

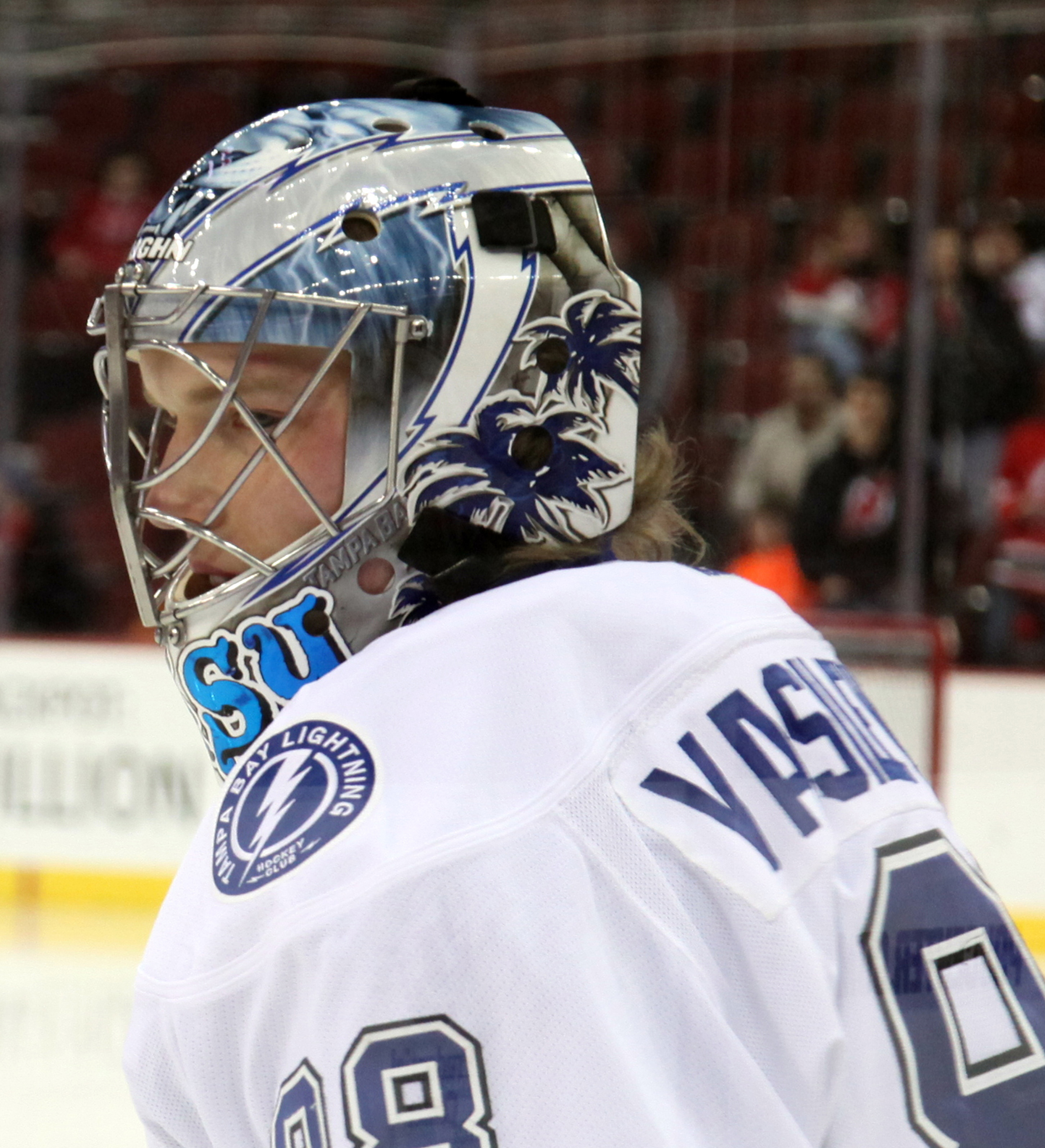
Andrei Vasilevskiy earned his first career playoff shutout to clinch the Stanley Cup for the Lightning in Game 6.

In game six, the Lightning took a 1–0 lead in the first period. After John Klingberg was penalized for tripping, Brayden Point fired a wrist shot that flew past Anton Khudobin after following the rebound of his own initial shot. Tampa Bay gained a 2–0 lead in the second period when a Stars turnover to Patrick Maroon got to Cedric Paquette, who set up Blake Coleman for a one-timer. The Stars remained scoreless for the rest of the game, but they had a close chance in the second period when Joel Kiviranta's shot was stopped by Andrei Vasilevskiy with his skate. Although had a goal been scored, it would have been disallowed as Corey Perry was penalized for goaltender interference on the play. The Lightning held Dallas to just eight shots in the first two periods combined. Vasilevskiy continued his shutout in the third period, stopping all 22 shots by Dallas, earning his first playoff shutout. With a 2–0 victory, the Tampa Bay Lightning won their second Stanley Cup. Lightning defenceman Victor Hedman was given the Conn Smythe Trophy as the most valuable player of the playoffs.

Scoring summary
Period	Team	Goal	Assist(s)	Time	Score
1st	TBL	Brayden Point (14) – pp	Nikita Kucherov (27), Victor Hedman (12)	12:23	1–0 TBL
2nd	TBL	Blake Coleman (5)	Cedric Paquette (3), Patrick Maroon (5)	07:01	2–0 TBL
3rd	None				
Penalty summary
Period	Team	Player	Penalty	Time	PIM
1st	DAL	Andrew Cogliano	Tripping	06:32	2:00
1st	DAL	John Klingberg	Tripping	11:58	2:00
1st	TBL	Victor Hedman	Interference	18:36	2:00
2nd	TBL	Ryan McDonagh	Interference	08:02	2:00
2nd	DAL	Corey Perry	Goaltender interference	09:22	2:00
3rd	TBL	Ryan McDonagh	Tripping	15:27	2:00

Shots by period
Team	1	2	3	Total
TBL	11	10	8	29
DAL	4	4	14	22

== Team rosters ==
Years indicated in boldface under the "Final appearance" column signify that the player won the Stanley Cup in the given year.

=== Dallas Stars ===
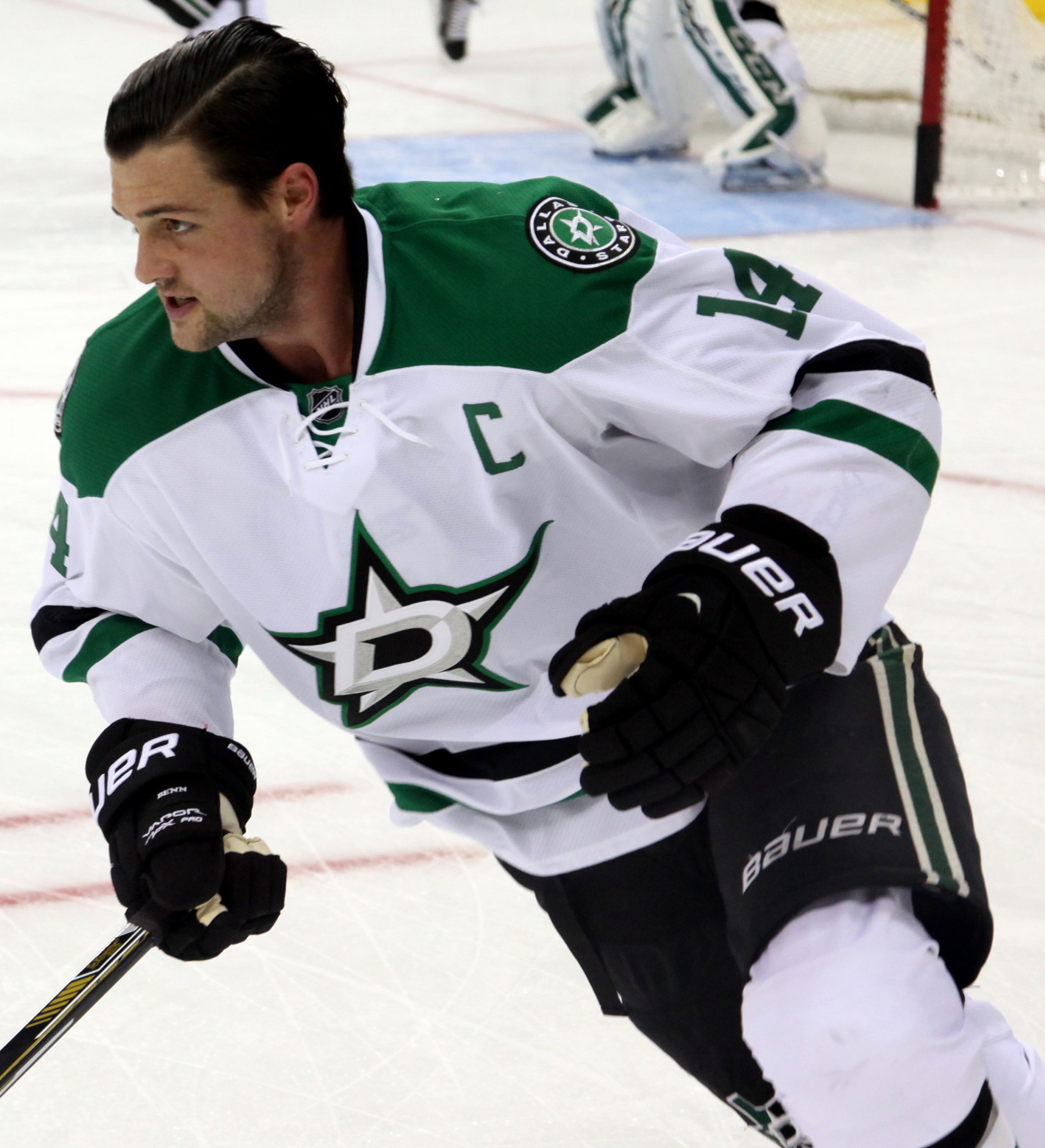
Jamie Benn captained the Stars to their fifth Stanley Cup Final appearance in franchise history and first since 2000.

#	Nat	Player	Position	Hand	Age	Acquired	Place of birth	Final appearance
14	(Canada)	Jamie Benn – **C**	LW	L	31	2007	Victoria, British Columbia	first
30	(United States)	Ben Bishop	G	L	33	2017	Denver, Colorado	second (2015)
17	(Canada)	Nick Caamano	RW	L	22	2016	Ancaster, Ontario	first
11	(Canada)	Andrew Cogliano	LW	L	33	2019	Toronto, Ontario	first
15	(Canada)	Blake Comeau – **A**	W	R	34	2018	Meadow Lake, Saskatchewan	first
18	(Canada)	Jason Dickinson	C/LW	L	25	2013	Georgetown, Ontario	first
37	(Canada)	Justin Dowling	C	L	29	2013	Calgary, Alberta	first
12	(Czech Republic)	Radek Faksa	C	L	26	2012	Vítkov, Czech Republic	first
42	(Canada)	Taylor Fedun	D	R	32	2018	Edmonton, Alberta	first
34	(Russia)	Denis Gurianov	LW	L	23	2015	Togliatti, Russia	first
39	(Canada)	Joel Hanley	D	L	29	2018	Keswick, Ontario	first
4	(Finland)	Miro Heiskanen	D	L	21	2017	Espoo, Finland	first
24	(Finland)	Roope Hintz	LW/C	L	23	2015	Tampere, Finland	first
13	(Sweden)	Mattias Janmark	LW	L	27	2015	Danderyd, Sweden	first
28	(United States)	Stephen Johns	D	R	28	2015	Ellwood City, Pennsylvania	first
35	(Russia)	Anton Khudobin	G	L	34	2018	Ust-Kamenogorsk, Soviet Union	second (2013)
25	(Finland)	Joel Kiviranta	LW	L	24	2019	Vantaa, Finland	first
3	(Sweden)	John Klingberg – **A**	D	R	28	2010	Lerum, Sweden	first
23	(Finland)	Esa Lindell – **A**	D	L	26	2012	Helsinki, Finland	first
29	(United States)	Jake Oettinger	G	L	21	2017	Lakeville, Minnesota	first
2	(Canada)	Jamie Oleksiak	D	L	27	2019	Toronto, Ontario	first
16	(United States)	Joe Pavelski	RW/C	R	36	2019	Plover, Wisconsin	second (2016)
10	(Canada)	Corey Perry	RW	R	35	2019	New Liskeard, Ontario	second (**2007**)
45	(Czech Republic)	Roman Polak	D	R	34	2018	Ostrava, Czechoslovakia	second (2016)
47	(Russia)	Alexander Radulov	RW	L	34	2017	Nizhny Tagil, Soviet Union	first
91	(Canada)	Tyler Seguin – **A**	C	R	28	2013	Brampton, Ontario	third (**2011**, 2013)
5	(Slovakia)	Andrej Sekera	D	L	34	2019	Bojnice, Czechoslovakia	first

=== Tampa Bay Lightning ===
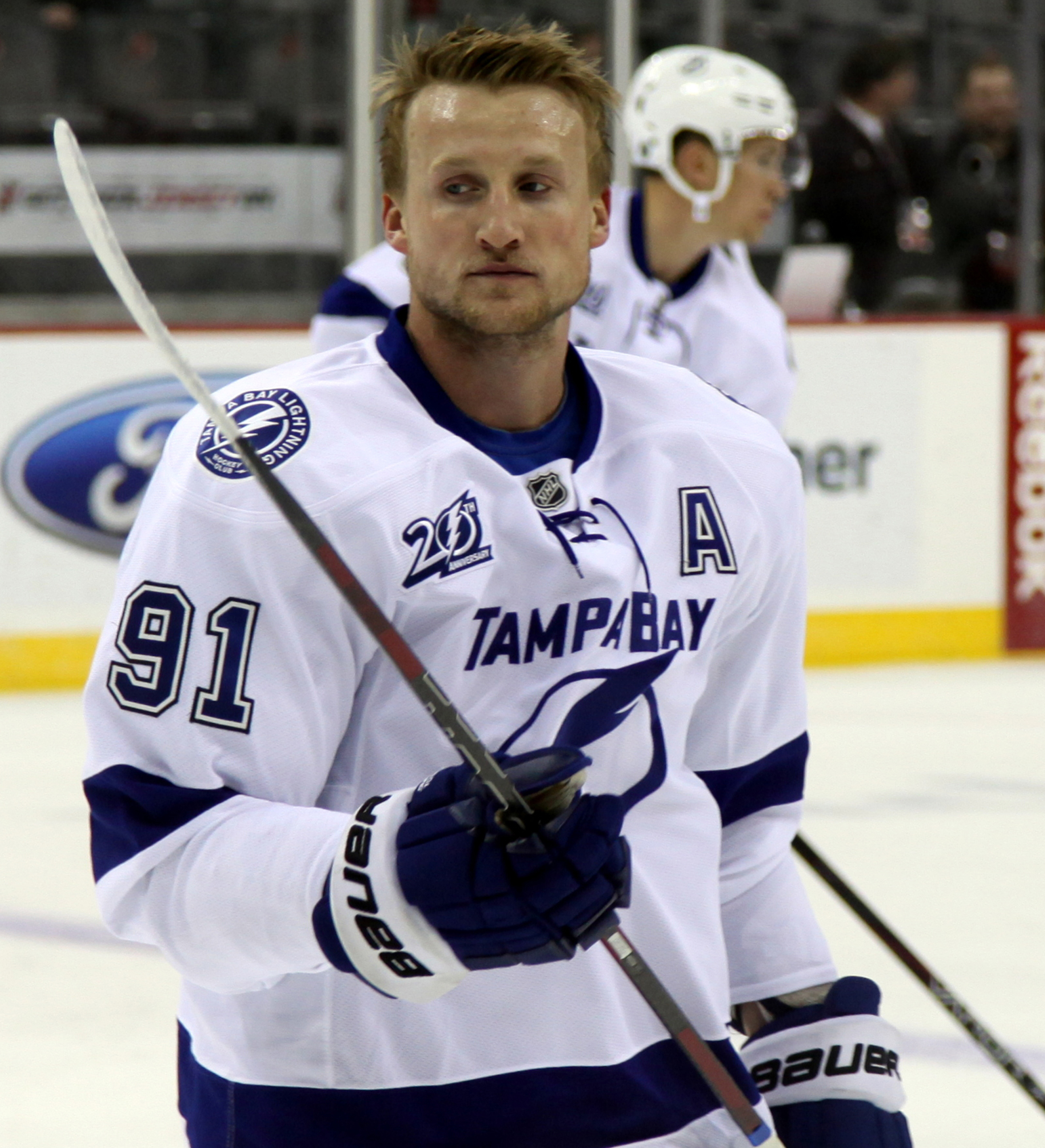
Lightning captain Steven Stamkos did not play in the first three rounds of the 2020 Stanley Cup playoffs as a result of a lower-body injury sustained in July, but, in his absence, the Lightning went on to their third Stanley Cup Final appearance in franchise history and first since 2015. He played his only game of the series and the playoffs in game three of the Final and scored the second goal of the game.

#	Nat	Player	Position	Hand	Age	Acquired	Place of birth	Final appearance
24	(United States)	Zach Bogosian	D	R	30	2020	Massena, New York	first
81	(Slovakia)	Erik Cernak	D	R	23	2017	Košice, Slovakia	first
71	(Canada)	Anthony Cirelli	C	L	23	2015	Woodbridge, Ontario	first
55	(Canada)	Braydon Coburn	D	L	35	2015	Calgary, Alberta	third (2010, 2015)
20	(United States)	Blake Coleman	C	L	28	2020	Plano, Texas	first
19	(Canada)	Barclay Goodrow	C/RW	L	27	2020	Toronto, Ontario	second (2016)
37	(Canada)	Yanni Gourde	LW	L	28	2014	Saint-Narcisse, Quebec	first
77	(Sweden)	Victor Hedman – **A**	D	L	29	2009	Örnsköldsvik, Sweden	second (2015)
9	(United States)	Tyler Johnson	C	R	30	2011	Spokane, Washington	second (2015)
17	(Canada)	Alex Killorn – **A**	C/LW	L	31	2007	Halifax, Nova Scotia	second (2015)
86	(Russia)	Nikita Kucherov	RW	L	27	2011	Maykop, Russia	second (2015)
14	(United States)	Patrick Maroon	LW	L	32	2019	St. Louis, Missouri	second (**2019**)
27	(United States)	Ryan McDonagh – **A**	D	L	31	2018	Saint Paul, Minnesota	second (2014)
35	(Canada)	Curtis McElhinney	G	L	37	2019	London, Ontario	first
18	(Czech Republic)	Ondrej Palat	LW	L	29	2011	Frýdek-Místek, Czechoslovakia	second (2015)
13	(Canada)	Cedric Paquette	C	L	27	2012	Gaspé, Quebec	second (2015)
21	(Canada)	Brayden Point	C	R	24	2014	Calgary, Alberta	first
44	(Czech Republic)	Jan Rutta	D	R	30	2019	Písek, Czechoslovakia	first
2	(Canada)	Luke Schenn	D	R	30	2019	Saskatoon, Saskatchewan	first
98	(Russia)	Mikhail Sergachev	D	L	22	2017	Nizhmekamsk, Russia	first
22	(United States)	Kevin Shattenkirk	D	R	31	2019	New Rochelle, New York	first
91	(Canada)	Steven Stamkos – **C**	C	R	30	2008	Markham, Ontario	second (2015)
67	(Canada)	Mitchell Stephens	C	R	23	2015	Peterborough, Ontario	first
88	(Russia)	Andrei Vasilevskiy	G	L	26	2012	Tyumen, Russia	second (2015)
23	(Canada)	Carter Verhaeghe	LW	L	25	2017	Waterdown, Ontario	first
92	(Russia)	Alexander Volkov	LW	L	23	2017	Moscow, Russia	first

== Stanley Cup engraving ==
The Stanley Cup was presented to Lightning captain Steven Stamkos by NHL commissioner Gary Bettman following the Lightning's 2–0 win in game six.

The following Lightning players and staff qualified to have their names engraved on the Stanley Cup:

2019–20 Tampa Bay Lightning

=== Players ===
Centres

- 9 Tyler Johnson*
- 13 Cedric Paquette
- 17 Alex Killorn* (A)
- 19 Barclay Goodrow*
- 20 Blake Coleman*
- 21 Brayden Point
- 23 Carter Verhaeghe*
- 37 Yanni Gourde
- 67 Mitchell Stephens*
- 71 Anthony Cirelli
- 91 Steven Stamkos* (Captain)

Wingers

- 7 Mathieu Joseph †
- 14 Pat Maroon
- 18 Ondrej Palat
- 86 Nikita Kucherov
- 92 Alexander Volkov

Defencemen

- 2 Luke Schenn
- 22 Kevin Shattenkirk
- 24 Zach Bogosian
- 27 Ryan McDonagh (A)
- 44 Jan Rutta
- 55 Braydon Coburn †
- 77 Victor Hedman (A)
- 81 Erik Cernak
- 98 Mikhail Sergachev

Goaltenders

- 88 Andrei Vasilevskiy
- 35 Curtis McElhinney
- * Played both centre and wing.
- † Automatically qualified for engraving despite shortened season, (Note: Automatic qualification for a player's name to be engraved on the Stanley Cup: Playing in (for a goaltender, dressing for) at least one Stanley Cup Final game or at least half of regular season games for the Stanley Cup winning team.) but did not play or dress in the Final.

=== Coaching and administrative staff ===
- Jeffrey Vinik (Chairman/Owner/Governor), Steve Griggs (Chief Executive Officer/Alt. Governor), Julien BriseBois (Vice President/General Manager/Alt. Governor),
- Allen Murray (Asst General Manager-Director of Amateur Scouting), Jamie Pushor (Asst. General Manager-Director of Player Personnel), Stacy Roest (Asst. General Manager-Director of Player Development), Mathieu Darche (Director of Hockey Operations),
- Jon Cooper (Head Coach), Jeff Halpern (Asst. Coach), Derek Lalonde (Asst. Coach),
- Todd Richards (Asst. Coach), Frantz Jean (Goaltending Coach), Brian Garlock (Video Coordinator),
- Nigel Kirwan (Video Coach)‡, Mark Lambert (Director of High Performance/Strength Coach), Tom Mulligan (Athletic Trainer)‡,
- Mike Poirier (Asst. Athletic Trainer), Ray Thill (Equipment Manager)‡, Rob Kennedy (Asst. Equipment Manager),
- Jason Berger (Asst. Equipment Manager), Christian Rivas (Massage Therapist) Brandon Rodgers (Physical Therapist, Asst. Strength & Conditioning Coach),
- Ryan Belec (Sr. Director of Team Services)‡, Liz Sylvia Kokoharsky (Director of Hockey Administration), Michael Peterson (Director of Hockey Analytics)
- ‡ Name engraved on the Stanley Cup with Tampa Bay in both 2004 and 2020.

=== Engraving notes ===
- #55 Braydon Coburn (D) played in 40 regular season and 3 playoff games. #7 Mathieu Joseph (RW) played in 37 regular season games, but none in the playoffs. Both were healthy scratches for the entire Final. Due to the shortened season, two players automatically qualified to have their names engraved on the Stanley Cup despite playing in fewer games than what would usually be required.
- Patrick Maroon became the third player in the expansion era to win back-to-back Stanley Cups with two different teams. Maroon won with St. Louis in 2019 and Tampa Bay in 2020. The only two other players who have won back to back cups with two different teams since 1967–68 are Claude Lemieux, who won in 1995 with New Jersey and in 1996 with Colorado; and Cory Stillman, who won in 2004 with Tampa Bay and in 2006 with Carolina (the 2004–05 season was not played due to the lockout). Additionally, Maroon's first name was listed simply as “Pat” on the 2020 engraving, after being listed as “Patrick” the prior year.
- In 2024, when the Florida Panthers won their first Stanley Cup, Carter Verhaeghe became the first player to win a Stanley Cup with both teams from the state of Florida.
- #29 Scott Wedgewood (G – 0 regular season games, 20 for Syracuse of the AHL). He did not play in or dress for any playoff games (he was a healthy scratch). He was the only player on the roster during the Final to be left off the Stanley Cup engraving due to not qualifying. He was included in the team picture.

== Television and radio ==
In Canada, the series was broadcast by Sportsnet and CBC Television in English, and TVA Sports in French. In the United States, the Final series were split between NBC (Games one, and four through six) and NBCSN (Games two and three). The NHL initially had plans to produce broadcasts for each game using a skeleton crew on-site, such as cameramen and producers, and then each media partners' commentators on both TV and radio were to call the games remotely. The league then allowed both Sportsnet and NBC commentators into the hubs.

As he had been doing throughout the playoffs, 74-year-old NBC lead play-by-play commentator Mike "Doc" Emrick called the Cup Final off monitors from his home studio in Metro Detroit, citing his advanced age as a potential risk for severe illness from COVID-19. These were the final games that Emrick called; he announced his retirement on October 19, 2020.

This also ended up the last Cup Final called by 63-year-old CBC/Sportsnet lead play-by-play commentator Jim Hughson. As the COVID-19 pandemic continued into the 2020–21 season, Hughson reduced his schedule to only work national Vancouver Canucks home games. He would later announce his retirement in September 2021.

== Notes ==
Preceded by St. Louis Blues; 2019	Tampa Bay Lightning; Stanley Cup champions 2020	Succeeded by Tampa Bay Lightning; 2021
