= Miro Heiskanen =

Finnish ice hockey player (born 1999)

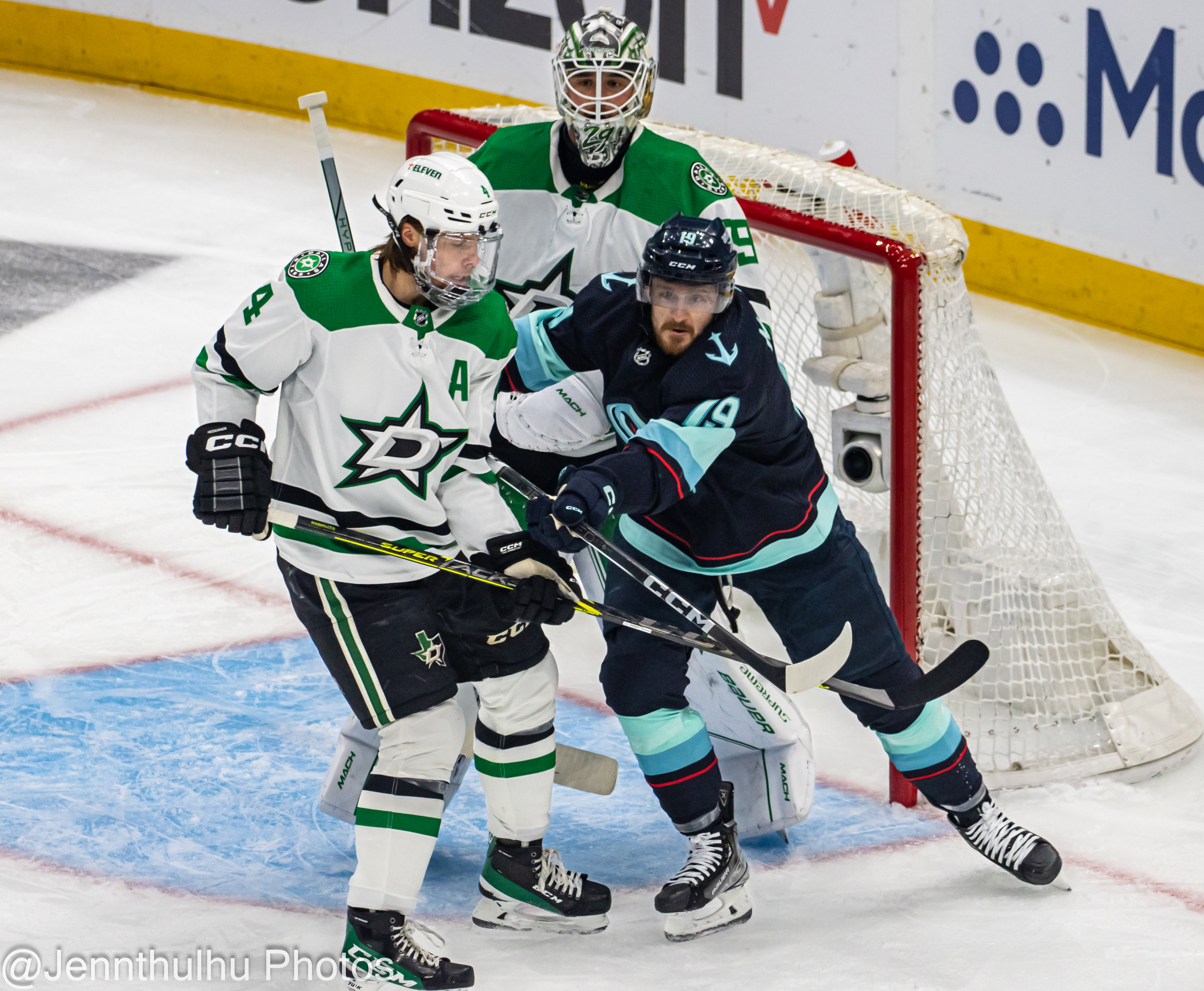
- Heiskanen with the Dallas Stars in 2023
- Born: 18 July 1999 (age 27) Espoo, Finland
- Height: 6 ft 2 in (188 cm)
- Weight: 197 lb (89 kg; 14 st 1 lb)
- Position: Defence
- Shoots: Left
- NHL team Former teams: Dallas Stars; HIFK
- National team: Finland
- NHL draft: 3rd overall, 2017; Dallas Stars
- Playing career: 2016–present

Miro Heiskanen (born 18 July 1999) is a Finnish professional ice hockey player who is a defenceman and alternate captain for the Dallas Stars of the National Hockey League (NHL). Ranked in the top 10 eligible European skaters by the NHL Central Scouting Bureau, Heiskanen was picked third overall in the 2017 NHL entry draft by the Stars.

== Playing career ==
=== HIFK (2014–2017) ===
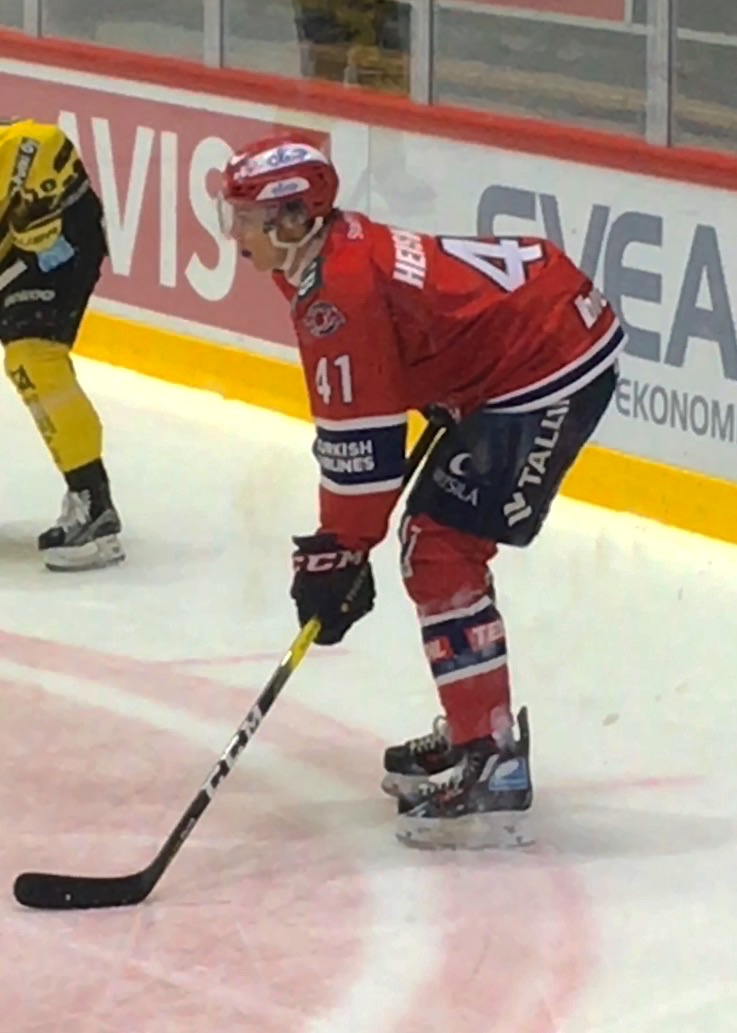
Heiskanen with HIFK in 2017.

Heiskanen played hockey until the age of 14 in the youth program of the Finnish Liiga club Espoo Blues. Later, Heiskanen played within the youth program of HIFK. In playing at the Junior A level during the 2015–16 season, he recorded 14 points in 30 games to be awarded with the Yrjö Hakala Award as rookie of the year. On 30 May 2016, he signed a three-year contract extension with the HIFK organization.

During the 2016–17 Liiga season, at age 17, Heiskanen made his professional debut with HIFK in the Liiga. In playing the full season in the Liiga, he played on HIFK's top defensive pairing, scoring 5 goals and 10 points in 37 games. HIFK head coach Antti Törmänen described him as his team's best defenceman that season, praising his ability to always make the right decisions. By the end of the season, Heiskanen was considered a top prospect at the 2017 NHL entry draft, with Göran Stubb of the NHL Central Scouting Bureau describing him as "by far the best European defenceman in the draft". Heiskanen was ultimately selected third overall by the Dallas Stars.

On 8 July 2017, Heiskanen signed a three-year, entry-level contract with the Stars. Heiskanen spent the 2017–18 Liiga season on loan with HIFK.

=== Dallas Stars (2018–present) ===
Heiskanen was named to the Stars' roster to start the 2018–19 NHL season and made his debut on 4 October in a 3–0 win over the Arizona Coyotes. On 25 October, in a 5–2 Stars win over the Anaheim Ducks, Heiskanen scored his first career NHL goal, beating goaltender John Gibson off a pass from Jason Spezza. In so doing, at 19 years and 99 days, Heiskanen became the second-youngest Stars defenceman to score a goal in the franchise's history. On 2 January 2019, Heiskanen was named the Stars' lone representative at the 2019 NHL All-Star Game, becoming the second rookie in the Stars/North Stars franchise history to be named to the All-Star Game. At the time of his selection, he was tied for seventh in the league among rookies and second among rookie defencemen with 17 points. After the Stars qualified for the 2019 Stanley Cup playoffs, Heiskanen became the third defencemen under the age of 20 to score two goals in a playoff game.

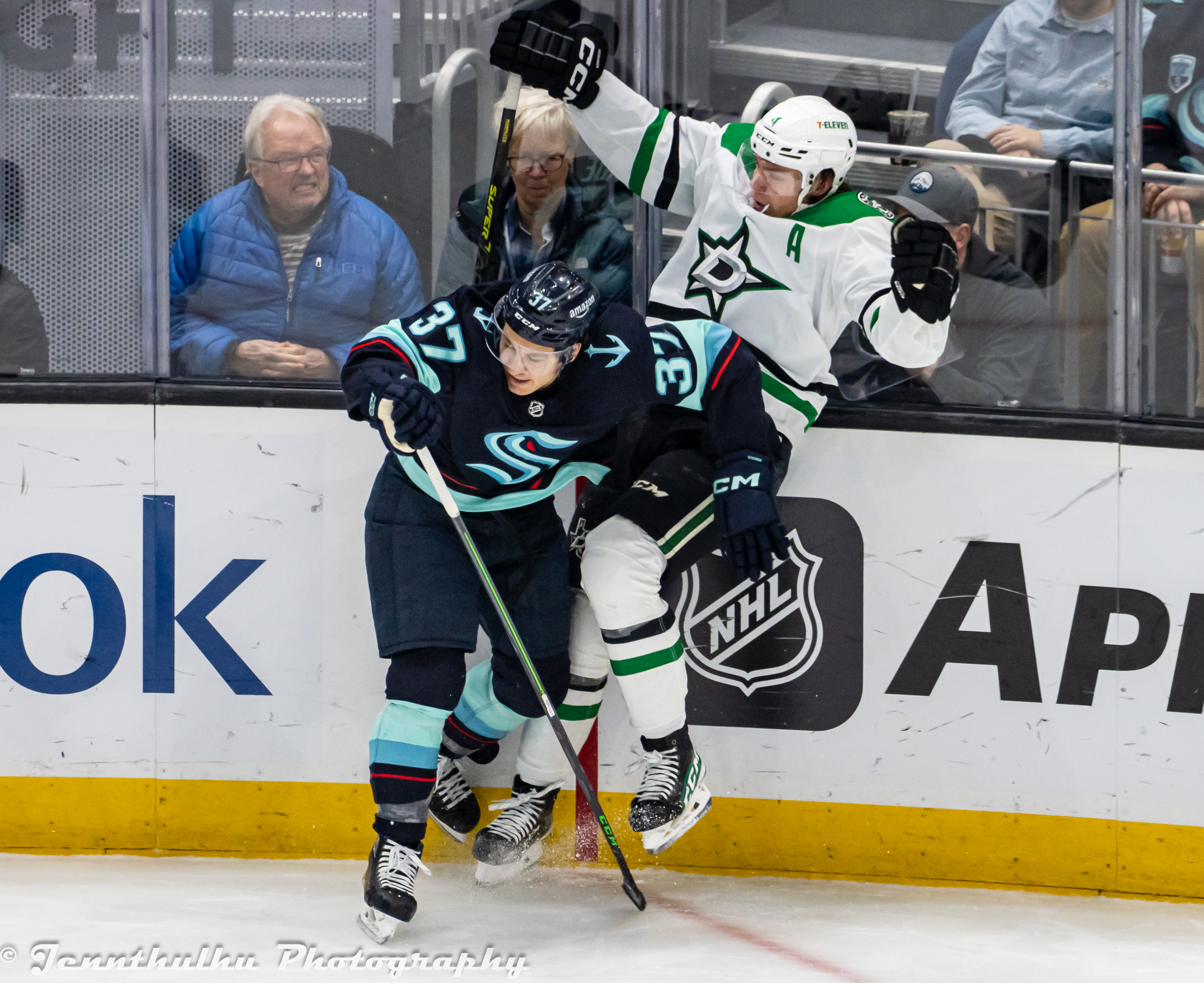
Heiskanen being checked by Yanni Gourde during a game in March 2023.

On 30 August 2020, in Game 4 of the Stars' second round playoff series against the Colorado Avalanche, Heiskanen would set the Stars' playoff record for points by a defenceman with 16. In reaching the 2020 Stanley Cup Finals, Heiskanen ended the playoff campaign with 26 points in 27 games, the fourth most by any defenceman during a playoff year in league history, behind only Paul Coffey in 1985, Brian Leetch in 1994 and Al MacInnis in 1989. The Stars would ultimately lose to the Tampa Bay Lightning in six games.

On 17 July 2021, Heiskanen signed an eight-year, $67.6 million contract with the Stars.

In the 2022–23 season, Heiskanen broke the record for most points in a season by a Stars defenceman, recording 11 goals and 62 assists for 73 points. The record was previously held by Sergei Zubov. His 73 points also tied former New York Rangers defenceman Reijo Ruotsalainen's record for most points in an NHL season by a Finnish-born defenceman.

== International play ==
Medal record

Representing Finland

Ice hockey

Olympic Games
| Bronze medal – third place | 2026 Milano Cortina | |

IIHF World Championship
| Gold medal – first place | 2022 Finland | |

IIHF World U18 Championship
| Gold medal – first place | 2016 United States | |
| Silver medal – second place | 2017 Slovakia | |

He represented Finland at the 2026 Winter Olympics and won a bronze medal.

== Career statistics ==
=== Regular season and playoffs ===
| | | | Regular season | | | | | Playoffs |
| Season | Team | League | GP | G | A | Pts | PIM | GP | G | A | Pts | PIM |
|---|---|---|---|---|---|---|---|---|---|---|---|---|
| 2014–15 | HIFK | FIN U18 | 35 | 7 | 13 | 20 | 8 | 12 | 0 | 2 | 2 | 2 |
| 2015–16 | HIFK | FIN U18 | 7 | 0 | 7 | 7 | 0 | 2 | 0 | 0 | 0 | 2 |
| 2015–16 | HIFK | FIN U20 | 30 | 3 | 11 | 14 | 6 | — | — | — | — | — |
| 2016–17 | HIFK | Liiga | 37 | 5 | 5 | 10 | 4 | 8 | 0 | 3 | 3 | 0 |
| 2017–18 | HIFK | Liiga | 30 | 11 | 12 | 23 | 8 | 14 | 3 | 6 | 9 | 18 |
| 2018–19 | Dallas Stars | NHL | 82 | 12 | 21 | 33 | 16 | 13 | 2 | 2 | 4 | 2 |
| 2019–20 | Dallas Stars | NHL | 68 | 8 | 27 | 35 | 12 | 27 | 6 | 20 | 26 | 2 |
| 2020–21 | Dallas Stars | NHL | 55 | 8 | 19 | 27 | 12 | — | — | — | — | — |
| 2021–22 | Dallas Stars | NHL | 70 | 5 | 31 | 36 | 24 | 7 | 1 | 2 | 3 | 4 |
| 2022–23 | Dallas Stars | NHL | 79 | 11 | 62 | 73 | 32 | 19 | 1 | 11 | 12 | 8 |
| 2023–24 | Dallas Stars | NHL | 71 | 9 | 45 | 54 | 36 | 19 | 6 | 10 | 16 | 8 |
| 2024–25 | Dallas Stars | NHL | 50 | 5 | 20 | 25 | 10 | 8 | 1 | 3 | 4 | 0 |
| 2025–26 | Dallas Stars | NHL | 77 | 9 | 54 | 63 | 30 | 6 | 2 | 4 | 6 | 2 |
| Liiga totals | | | 67 | 16 | 17 | 33 | 12 | 22 | 3 | 9 | 12 | 18 |
| NHL totals | | | 552 | 67 | 279 | 346 | 172 | 99 | 19 | 52 | 71 | 26 |

=== International ===
| Year | Team | Event | Result | GP | G | A | Pts | PIM |
|---|---|---|---|---|---|---|---|---|
| 2015 | Finland | U17 | 5th | 5 | 0 | 4 | 4 | 2 |
| 2016 | Finland | WJC18 | 1st place, gold medalist(s) | 7 | 0 | 1 | 1 | 0 |
| 2017 | Finland | WJC | 9th | 6 | 0 | 1 | 1 | 0 |
| 2017 | Finland | WJC18 | 2nd place, silver medalist(s) | 7 | 2 | 10 | 12 | 0 |
| 2018 | Finland | WJC | 6th | 5 | 0 | 2 | 2 | 0 |
| 2018 | Finland | OG | 6th | 5 | 1 | 0 | 1 | 2 |
| 2018 | Finland | WC | 5th | 8 | 0 | 2 | 2 | 0 |
| 2022 | Finland | WC | 1st place, gold medalist(s) | 6 | 1 | 6 | 7 | 2 |
| 2026 | Finland | OG | 3rd place, bronze medalist(s) | 6 | 2 | 3 | 5 | 4 |
| Junior totals | | | | 30 | 2 | 18 | 20 | 2 |
| Senior totals | | | | 25 | 4 | 11 | 15 | 8 |

== Awards and honours ==
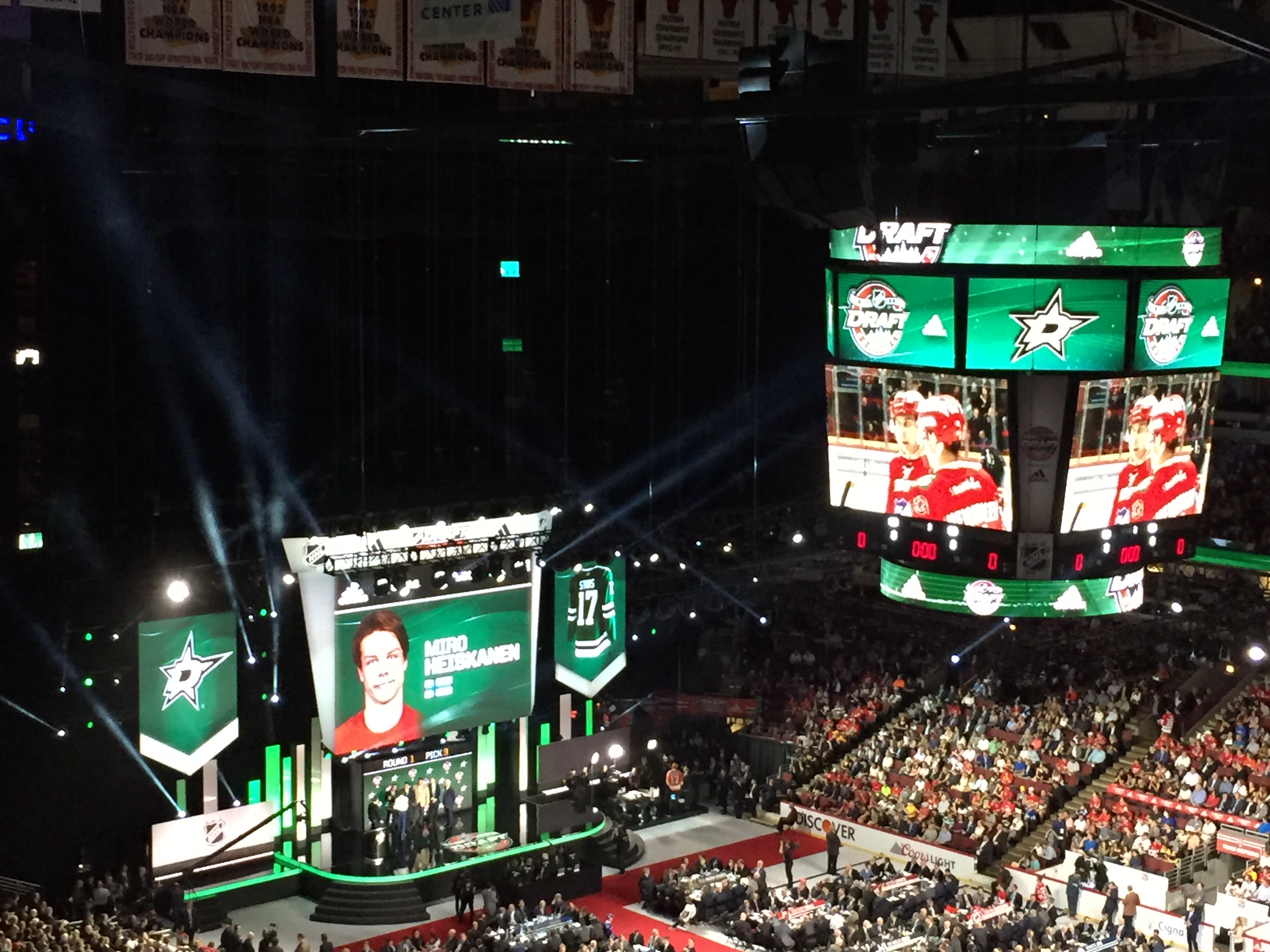
Heiskanen was selected third overall in the 2017 NHL entry draft.

| Award | Year |
Jr. A
| Yrjö Hakala Award | 2016 |
Liiga
| Pekka Rautakallio trophy | 2018 |
NHL
| NHL All-Star Game | 2019 |
| NHL All-Rookie Team | 2019 |
International
| WJC18 All-Star Team | 2017 |
| WJC18 Best Defenceman | 2017 |

Awards and achievements
| Preceded by Riley Tufte | Dallas Stars first-round draft pick 2017 | Succeeded by Jake Oettinger |
