= William Grigg =

William Grigg may refer to:

- William Grigg (Master of Clare College, Cambridge) (died 1726), Master of Clare 1713–1726
- Will Grigg (born 1991), Northern Irish footballer
- William Norman Grigg (1963–2017), writer

== See also ==
- William Griggs (disambiguation)
