= John Grigg (disambiguation) =

John Grigg (1924–2001) was a British writer, historian and politician.

John Grigg may also refer to:

- John Grigg (astronomer) (1838–1920), New Zealand astronomer
- John Grigg (New Zealand politician) (1828–1901)

== See also ==
- Jonathan Grigg, British medical doctor and professor
- John Griggs (disambiguation)
