= Cédric Paquette =

Canadian ice hockey player (born 1993)

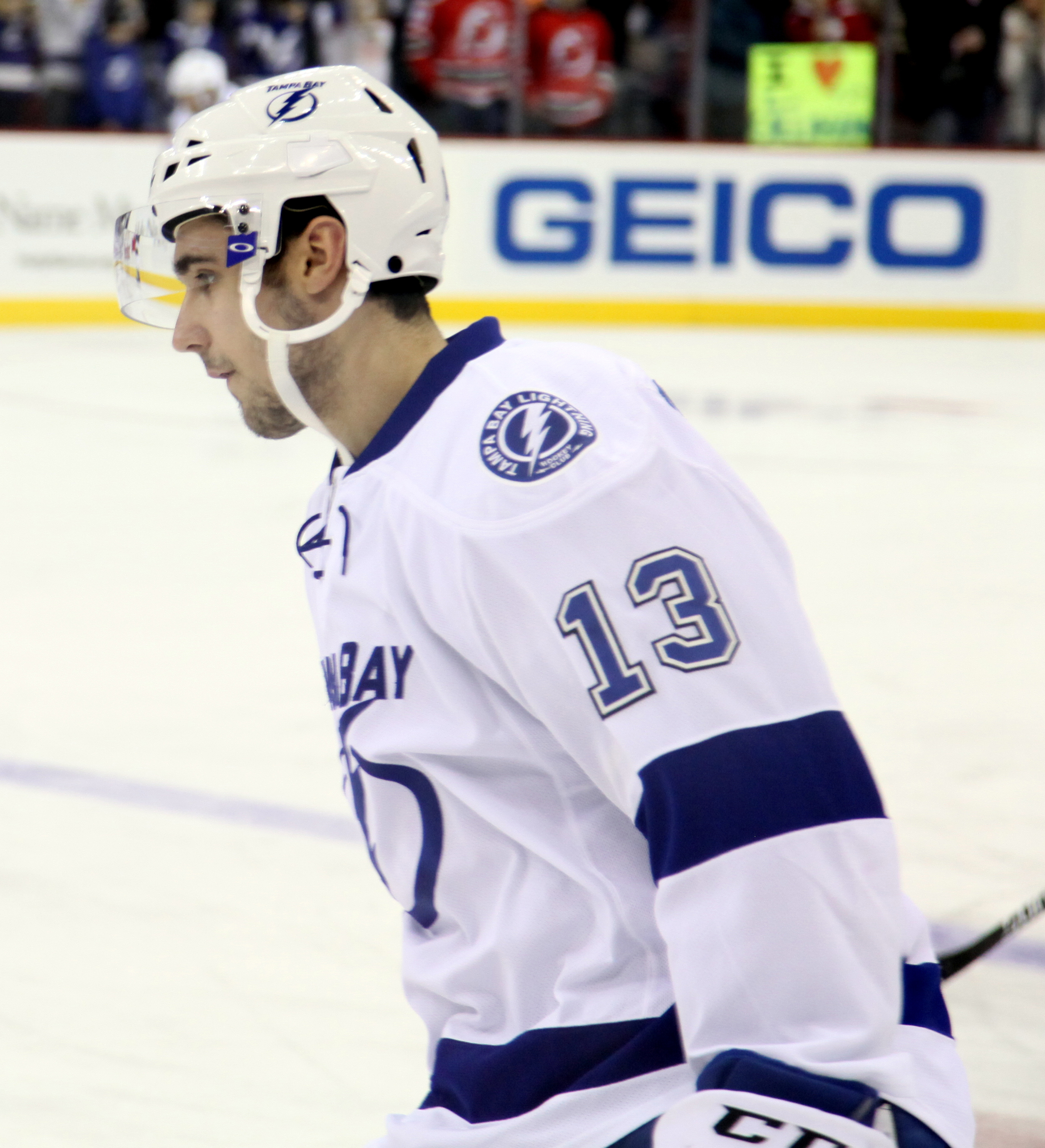
- Paquette with the Tampa Bay Lightning in December 2014
- Born: August 13, 1993 (age 33) Gaspé, Quebec, Canada
- Height: 6 ft 1 in (185 cm)
- Weight: 198 lb (90 kg; 14 st 2 lb)
- Position: Centre
- Shoots: Left
- KHL team Former teams: Avangard Omsk; Tampa Bay Lightning; Ottawa Senators; Carolina Hurricanes; Montreal Canadiens; Dinamo Minsk; Dynamo Moscow
- NHL draft: 101st overall, 2012; Tampa Bay Lightning
- Playing career: 2013–present

Cédric Paquette (born August 13, 1993) is a Canadian professional ice hockey player for the Avangard Omsk of the Kontinental Hockey League (KHL). He was selected in the fourth round, 101st overall, by the Tampa Bay Lightning of the National Hockey League (NHL) in the 2012 NHL entry draft and won the Stanley Cup with the Lightning in 2020. Paquette has also previously played for the Ottawa Senators, Carolina Hurricanes, and Montreal Canadiens.

== Playing career ==
=== Junior ===
As a youth, Paquette played in the 2006 Quebec International Pee-Wee Hockey Tournament with a minor ice hockey team from Chandler, Quebec.

Paquette played for College Notre-Dame of Montreal for three seasons scoring 28 goals. He then played major junior hockey in the Quebec Major Junior Hockey League (QMJHL) with the Montreal Juniors and Blainville-Boisbriand Armada, scoring 58 goals and 131 points, with 191 penalty minutes, in 126 games played.

=== Professional ===
==== Tampa Bay Lightning ====
Paquette was drafted in the fourth round, 101st overall by the Tampa Bay Lightning in the 2012 NHL entry draft. On May 3, 2013, the Lightning signed Paquette to a three-year, entry-level professional contract, assigning him to their American Hockey League (AHL) affiliate, the Syracuse Crunch, to start the 2013–14 season. On April 11, 2014, after posting 20 goals and 22 assists, with 153 penalty minutes, in 70 games played with the Crunch, the Lighting recalled Paquette. On November 4, 2014, during the 2014–15 season the Lightning recalled Paquette from Syracuse, his second recall of the season after having previously appeared in four games with the team. Two nights later, on November 6, Paquette scored his first two NHL goals in Tampa Bay's victory over the Calgary Flames, 5–2. On January 29, 2015, Paquette scored his first career NHL hat-trick in a 5–1 win over the visiting Detroit Red Wings. On April 27, he scored his first career Stanley Cup playoff goal in a 5–2 Lightning win over the Red Wings in the Eastern Conference Quarter-final. On November 4, 2014, during the 2014–15 season the Lightning recalled Paquette from Syracuse, his second recall of the season after having previously appeared in four games with the team. Two nights later, on November 6, Paquette scored his first two NHL goals in Tampa Bay's victory over the Calgary Flames, 5–2. On January 29, 2015, Paquette scored his first career NHL hat-trick in a 5–1 win over the visiting Detroit Red Wings. On April 27, he scored his first career Stanley Cup playoff goal in a 5–2 Lightning win over the Red Wings in the Eastern Conference Quarter-final.

On June 24, 2016, the Lightning announced that it had re-signed Paquette to a two-year contract extension. Paquette appeared in 56 games with the team in the previous season, registering six goals, eleven points, and 51 penalty minutes. His 51 penalty minutes were good for fourth on the team during the regular season. He was also one of five Lightning players to score a shorthanded goal during the 2015–2016 season. Paquette also played in 17 Stanley Cup Playoff games with the team, posting one assist and 24 penalty minutes. Paquette had played in 122 NHL games, all with the Lightning, over the previous three seasons. During that span he recorded 18 goals and 31 points to go along with 102 penalty minutes.

On November 30, 2017, the NHL Department of Player Safety announced that Paquette had been suspended for one game for boarding Boston Bruins' defenseman Torey Krug on November 29, 2017, at TD Garden.

During the 2018–19 season, Paquette had a career-high 13 goals along with 4 assists and 17 points in a career high 80 games with the Lightning and led the team in penalty minutes.

On July 5, 2019, the Lighting signed Paquette to a two-year, $3.3 million contract extension. In 2019–20, Paquette scored 7 goals, 11 assists and 18 points in 61 games with the Lightning until the last 3 weeks of the 2019-20 season got annulled due to the COVID-19 pandemic restrictions. He also played in 25 playoff games as the Lightning won the Stanley Cup against the Dallas Stars, defeating the Stars in 6 games.

==== Ottawa Senators and Carolina Hurricanes ====
On December 27, 2020, Paquette's seven-season tenure with the Lightning ended as he was traded along with Braydon Coburn and a second round pick in 2022 to the Ottawa Senators in exchange for Marián Gáborík and Anders Nilsson. After attending the Senators training camp for the pandemic delayed 2020–21 season, Paquette made his Senators debut on the club's fourth line in a 5–3 opening night victory over the Toronto Maple Leafs on January 15, 2021.

On February 13, 2021, after a very brief stint with the Senators, Paquette, who played in nine games, was traded along with Alex Galchenyuk to the Carolina Hurricanes in exchange for Ryan Dzingel. He played out the remainder of his contract with the contending Hurricanes, collecting 3 goals and 7 points through 38 regular season games.

==== Montreal Canadiens ====
As a free agent from the Hurricanes, Paquette joined his fourth club in short succession by agreeing to a one-year, $950,000 contract with the Montreal Canadiens on July 28, 2021. He was intended to be a replacement for Corey Perry. However, he saw his ice time diminish having only scored 2 points in 24 games until being scratched from the lineup from January 20 to March 13, 2022. That day he was placed on waivers and was demoted to the Laval Rocket of the AHL. He played in 14 regular season games with Laval and 14 playoff games.

==== KHL ====
As a free agent from the Canadiens, Paquette went overseas and accepted a contract with Belarusian club, HC Dinamo Minsk of the KHL, on August 16, 2022.

Following a successful lone season with Minsk, Paquette extended his career in the KHL by signing a two-year contract with Russian based club, HC Dynamo Moscow, on May 2, 2023.

Paquette played three seasons with Dynamo before opting to continue in the KHL with Avangard Omsk, signing a one-year contract for the 2026–27 season on June 29, 2026.

== Personal life ==
Paquette's cousin, Christopher Paquette, was also drafted by the Lightning in the 2016 NHL entry draft. His cousin was taken in the fifth round with the 148th overall pick. On October 21, 2024, Paquette announced that he had acquired Russian citizenship and thus was no longer considered an import in the Kontinental Hockey League.

== Career statistics ==
			Regular season					Playoffs
Season	Team	League	GP	G	A	Pts	PIM	GP	G	A	Pts	PIM
2008–09	Collège Notre-Dame Albatros	QMAAA	45	12	6	18	34	4	0	0	0	4
2009–10	Collège Notre-Dame Albatros	QMAAA	32	10	18	28	83	8	5	2	7	24
2010–11	Collège Notre-Dame Albatros	QMAAA	34	28	27	55	102	17	5	11	16	36
2010–11	Montreal Juniors	QMJHL	4	0	0	0	2	—	—	—	—	—
2011–12	Blainville-Boisbriand Armada	QMJHL	63	31	17	48	88	11	7	10	17	22
2012–13	Blainville-Boisbriand Armada	QMJHL	63	27	56	83	103	15	7	5	12	33
2012–13	Syracuse Crunch	AHL	—	—	—	—	—	3	0	0	0	0
2013–14	Syracuse Crunch	AHL	70	20	24	44	153	—	—	—	—	—
2013–14	Tampa Bay Lightning	NHL	2	0	1	1	0	4	0	2	2	16
2014–15	Syracuse Crunch	AHL	5	4	3	7	7	—	—	—	—	—
2014–15	Tampa Bay Lightning	NHL	64	12	7	19	51	24	3	0	3	28
2015–16	Tampa Bay Lightning	NHL	56	6	5	11	51	17	0	1	1	24
2016–17	Tampa Bay Lightning	NHL	58	4	6	10	80	—	—	—	—	—
2017–18	Tampa Bay Lightning	NHL	56	5	4	9	41	17	1	1	2	37
2018–19	Tampa Bay Lightning	NHL	80	13	4	17	80	4	1	0	1	0
2019–20	Tampa Bay Lightning	NHL	61	7	11	18	42	25	0	3	3	16
2020–21	Ottawa Senators	NHL	9	1	0	1	4	—	—	—	—	—
2020–21	Carolina Hurricanes	NHL	38	3	4	7	17	4	0	1	1	2
2021–22	Montreal Canadiens	NHL	24	0	2	2	25	—	—	—	—	—
2021–22	Laval Rocket	AHL	14	9	1	10	28	14	4	3	7	12
2022–23	Dinamo Minsk	KHL	57	14	13	27	56	5	2	0	2	33
2023–24	Dynamo Moscow	KHL	57	22	13	35	28	8	4	3	7	8
2024–25	Dynamo Moscow	KHL	64	16	18	34	66	15	3	7	10	4
2025–26	Dynamo Moscow	KHL	21	6	4	10	36	—	—	—	—	—
NHL totals			448	51	44	95	391	95	5	8	13	123
KHL totals			199	58	48	106	186	28	9	10	19	45

== Awards and honours ==
Award	Year
NHL
Stanley Cup champion	2020
