= Richard Griggs =

American politician and author

Richard Griggs (died 1883) was a state legislator and author in Mississippi. He also served as a court clerk.

He was born in Tennessee and enslaved, having had more than a dozen owners including Nathan B. Forrest. He served as Mississippi’s commissioner of immigration and agriculture.

He authored Guide to Mississippi.
