= Hal Griggs =

Hal Griggs may refer to:

- Hal Griggs (American football) (1900–1987), Canadian National Football League running back
- Hal Griggs (baseball) (1928–2005), American baseball player
