= Alice Maynard Griggs =

American writer, musician, and artist (1859 - 1939)

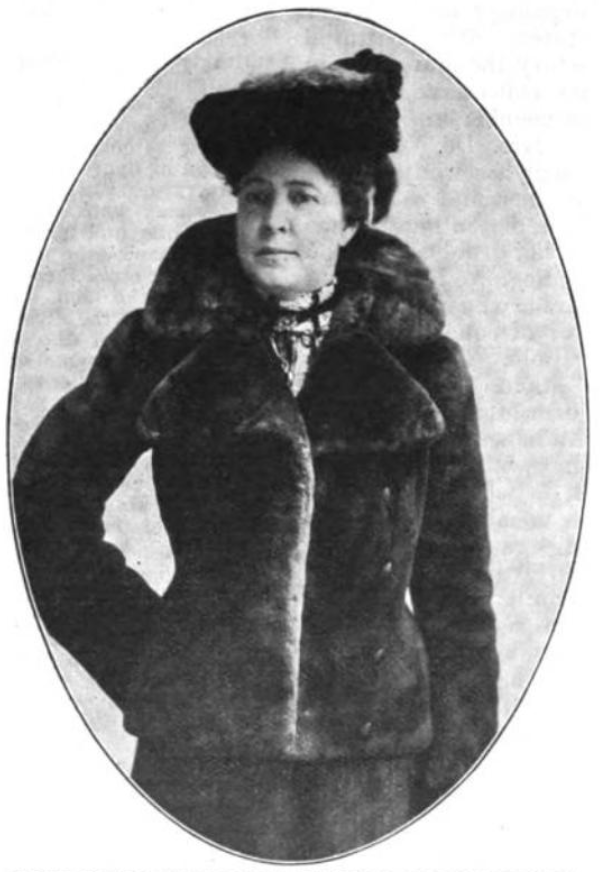
- Alice Maynard Griggs, from a 1908 publication
- Born: Alice E. Maynard; June 9, 1859; Decorah, Iowa, U.S.
- Died: April 9, 1939 (age 79); Long Beach, California, U.S.
- Occupations: Writer, journalist, poet, critic, artist, clubwoman, composer

Alice E. Maynard Woods Griggs (June 9, 1859 – April 9, 1939) was an American writer, artist, composer, clubwoman, and critic, based in Long Beach, California.

== Early life and education ==
Alice E. Maynard was born in Decorah, Iowa, the daughter of Guy C. Maynard and Colena Emogene Moore Maynard. Her father was a carpenter from New Hampshire and a Union Army veteran of the American Civil War, and her mother was from Vermont. She attended the Dana Musical Institute in Ohio, and the Chicago Art Institute.

== Career ==
Before moving to California, Griggs was president of the Round-the-World Club of Denver, and a member of the Denver Women's Press Club. She was president of the Seattle Musical Arts Society and the Woman's Century Club of Seattle.

Griggs was a correspondent, columnist, and arts critic for Musical America, the Long Beach Press-Telegram, and Pacific Coast Musician, among other publications. She was a founder and longtime press chair of the Long Beach Musical Arts Club. Her compositions were part of a program at the Woman's Music Study Club in Long Beach in 1924.

Griggs was treasurer of the Long Beach Art Association. Her painting "Zinnias and Gourds" was part of the Association's 1933 show. Two of her paintings, "Gourds" and a still life featuring "anemones and a brass basket", were part of the Association's show at the Ebell Club in 1935. She won a state prize for her painting "California Dahlias" in 1937. She exhibited her paintings in Palos Verdes in February 1939, shortly before her death.

== Publications ==
=== Journalism, fiction, and poetry ===
- "An Interrupted Cadence" (1908, poem)
- "The Progress of Suffrage" (1908, article)
- "The Litany" (1908, short story)
- "Seattle to Have Permanent Symphony Organization" (1919, article)
- "Free Concerts Stimulate Progress at Long Beach" (1921, article)
- "Oil Wells Promise Long Beach a Hall" (1922, article)
- "New Hall Delayed, but Long Beach is Optimistic" (1924, article)
- "Long Beach Gets Municipal Auditorium" (1928, article)

=== Music ===
- "Mi Querido" (1906, waltz, music by Frank Van R. Bunn)
- "The Loop Waltz" (1906, musical composition)
- "The Moffat Two-Step" (1906, musical composition for piano)
- "Cotton Pickin' Time" (1908, lullaby "in the quaint negro dialect", music by Frank Van R. Bunn)
- "Mah Lil' Coal Black Boy" (1908, song, music by Frank Van R. Bunn; also known as "Mah Lil' Baby Boy")
- "Zolola, My Little Choctaw Maid" (1909, song, music by Arthur Bowes)
- A Swift Elopement (1913, a one-act opera, music by Drusilla S. Percival)
- "Danza Mexicana Recuerdo" (musical composition)
- "The South Wind" and "Awake, 'Tis Spring" (1923, songs)
- "Maple Leaves and Cherry Blossoms" (1923, song)
- "Fedalma (The Spanish Gypsy)" (song)
- "Black Widow Tarantelle" (musical composition)

== Personal life ==
Alice Maynard married piano seller and music publisher Walter W. Griggs in 1900. Her husband died in 1922. She died in 1939, at about 80 years of age, in Long Beach. In her memory, the Musical Arts Club set up a scholarship and audition fund in her name.
