= Yanni Gourde =

Canadian ice hockey player (born 1991)

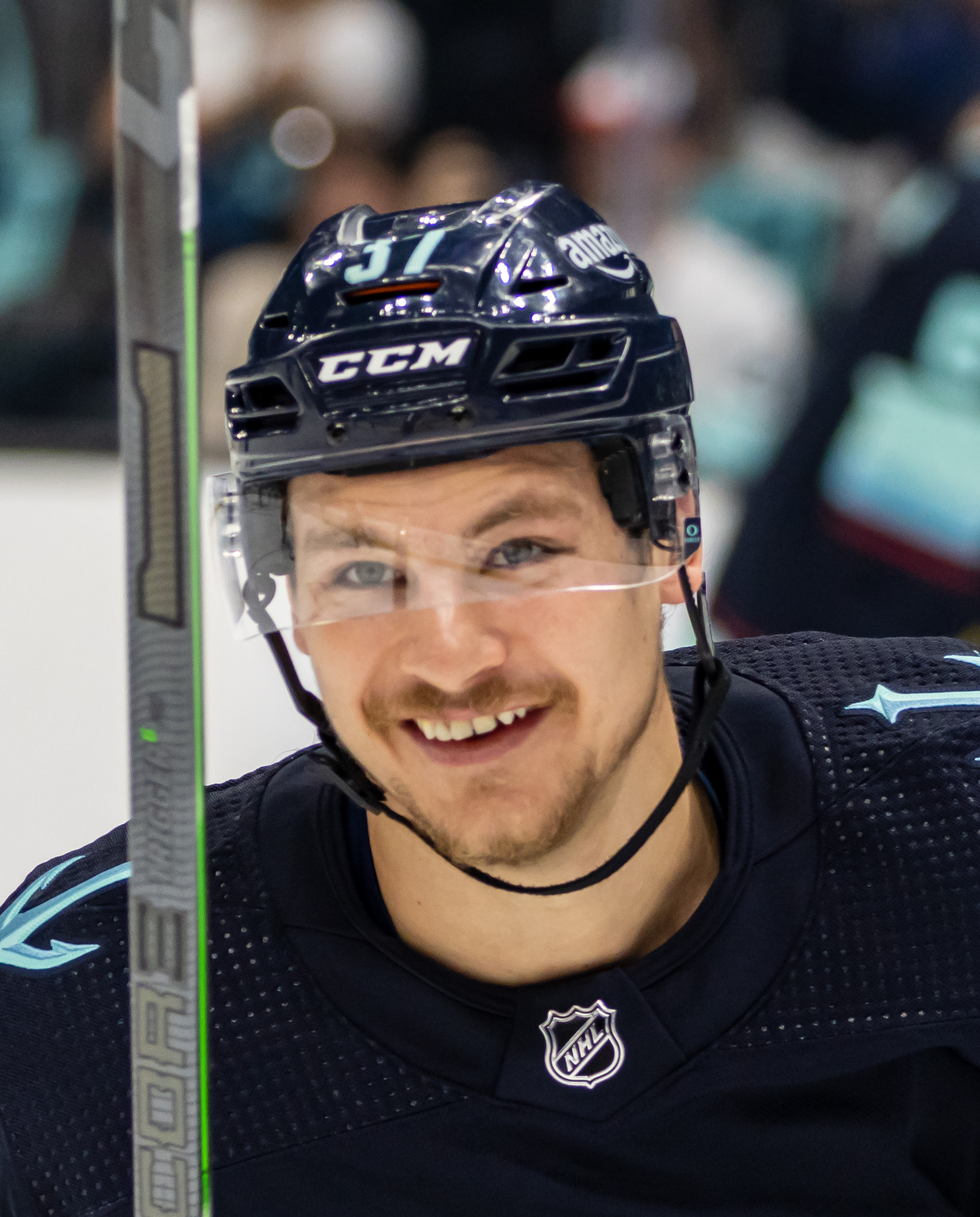
- Gourde with the Seattle Kraken in May 2023
- Born: December 15, 1991 (age 34) Saint-Narcisse, Quebec, Canada
- Height: 5 ft 9 in (175 cm)
- Weight: 173 lb (78 kg; 12 st 5 lb)
- Position: Forward
- Shoots: Left
- NHL team Former teams: Tampa Bay Lightning; Seattle Kraken
- NHL draft: Undrafted
- Playing career: 2008–present

Yanni Gourde (born December 15, 1991) is a Canadian professional ice hockey player who is a forward for the Tampa Bay Lightning of the National Hockey League (NHL).

Growing up in Quebec, Gourde played ice hockey in the area until eventually joining the Victoriaville Tigres of the Quebec Major Junior Hockey League (QMJHL) in 2008. In his final year with the team, he was the league's top scorer and most valuable player. He then signed with the Worcester Sharks of the American Hockey League (AHL) in 2012. After spending time with the Sharks, as well as the San Francisco Bulls and the Kalamazoo Wings of the ECHL, he signed with the NHL's Tampa Bay Lightning in 2014.

Gourde started with the organization by playing with the Lightning's AHL affiliate, the Syracuse Crunch, and he eventually made his NHL debut in 2015 and registered his first NHL goal in 2017. In 2020 and 2021, he won the Stanley Cup with the Lightning. In the latter year, after winning the Cup, he was selected by the Seattle Kraken in the 2021 NHL expansion draft. After four seasons with the Kraken, in 2025, he was traded back to the Lightning.

== Playing career ==
=== Junior ===
As a child, Gourde played in the 2003, 2004 and 2005 Quebec International Pee-Wee Hockey Tournaments with minor ice hockey team Rive-Sud. Gourde later played with the Lévis Commandeurs and the Jonquière Élites of the Quebec Midget AAA Hockey League before joining the Victoriaville Tigres of the Quebec Major Junior Hockey League (QMJHL) in 2008. In 2008–09, his first season with the Tigres, he collected one assist through four games played. In 59 games during the 2009–10 season, he notched 11 goals and 17 assists for 28 points. During the 2010–11 season, he recorded 26 goals and 42 assists through 68 games. During the 2011–12 season with the Tigres, Gourde tallied 37 goals and 87 assists for 124 points through 68 games. These statistics earned him the Jean Béliveau Trophy as the QMJHL's top scorer, the Michel Brière Memorial Trophy as the league's most valuable player, and a spot on the league's First All-Star Team.

=== Minor leagues ===
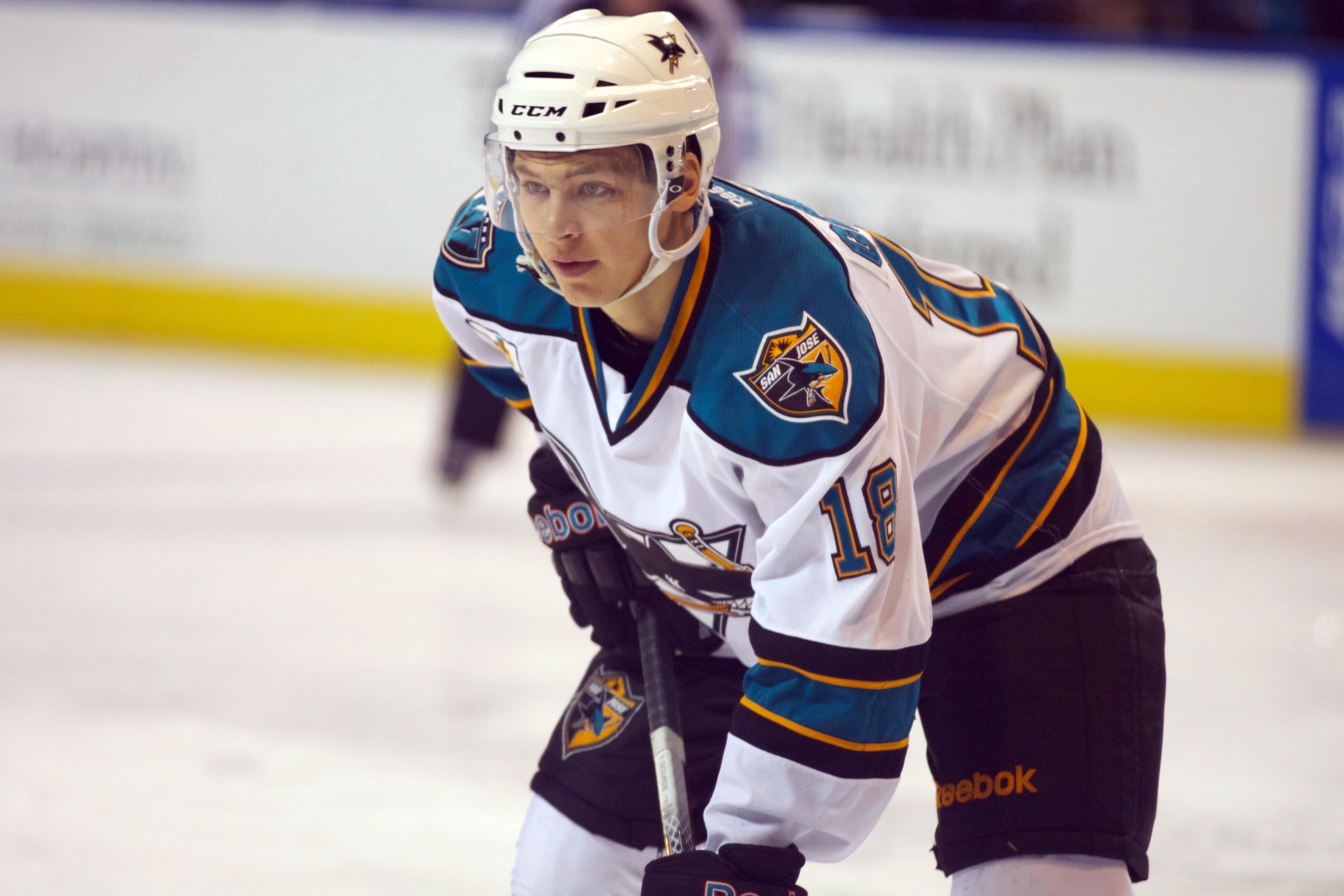
Gourde with the Sharks in 2012

In April 2012, after finishing his season with the Victoriaville Tigres, Gourde signed an amateur tryout offer with the Worcester Sharks of the American Hockey League (AHL). He played four games with the team during the remainder of the 2011–12 season, managing one goal and two assists in that span. After the season, Gourde was signed to a one-year contract by the Sharks. Gourde was named to the Sharks' opening roster for the 2012–13 season. With the Sharks that season, he tallied eight goals in 54 games. Gourde also played eight games with the Sharks' ECHL affiliate, the San Francisco Bulls, during the season, achieving 10 points.

For the next season in 2013–14, Gourde signed with the ECHL's Kalamazoo Wings, where he posted 15 goals and 34 points in 30 games. On January 7, 2014, the Sharks once again took interest in Gourde, signing him to a 25-game professional tryout offer. Through those games with the Sharks, Gourde had a point-per-game pace, notching four goals and 21 assists for 25 points.

=== Tampa Bay Lightning ===
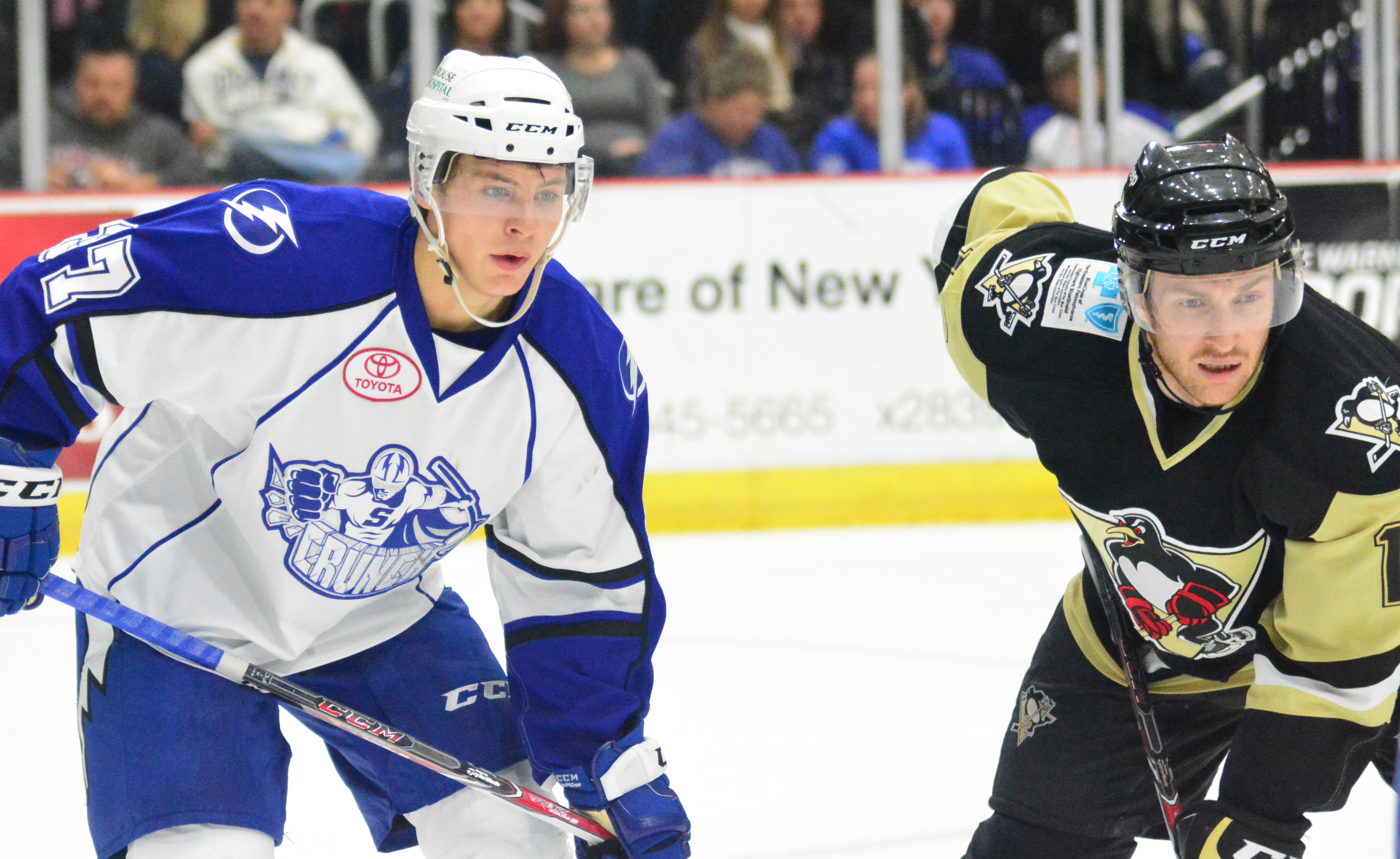
Gourde (left) with the Crunch in March 2014

On March 10, 2014, Gourde agreed to a two-year, entry-level contract with the Tampa Bay Lightning of the National Hockey League (NHL). The contract began during the 2014–15 season, and until then, for the remainder of the 2013–14 season, he remained with the Lightning's AHL affiliate, the Syracuse Crunch. During that period, he tallied two goals and six assists through 18 games. Gourde was named to the Crunch's opening night roster for the 2014–15 season. That season, Gourde was named AHL Player of the Month for November after recording nine goals, nine assists, and a +13 plus–minus rating in 18 games. He completed the season with 29 goals and 28 assists for 57 points in 76 games, his scoring numbers ahead of all Crunch players except Jonathan Marchessault. Gourde also led the team in power play goals, with eight. During the 2015 Calder Cup playoffs, Gourde recorded one goal and one assist, which came in a game on April 29, 2015, during which the Crunch were eliminated in a 5–2 loss to the Wilkes-Barre/Scranton Penguins.

After participating in the Lightning's training camp, Gourde was returned to the Crunch to start the 2015–16 season. He continued his scoring pace from the previous season, his point total placing third on the team by the time he received his first call-up to the Lightning on December 14, 2015. The next day, Gourde made his NHL debut in a 5–4 overtime Lightning win over the Toronto Maple Leafs. In that game, he registered his first NHL assist and point on a goal by Mike Blunden. After playing another game with the Lightning, he was returned to the Crunch on December 29. Through 65 games with the Crunch, he ended the season recording 14 goals and 30 assists. On July 25, 2016, the Lightning re-signed Gourde to a one-year, two-way contract.

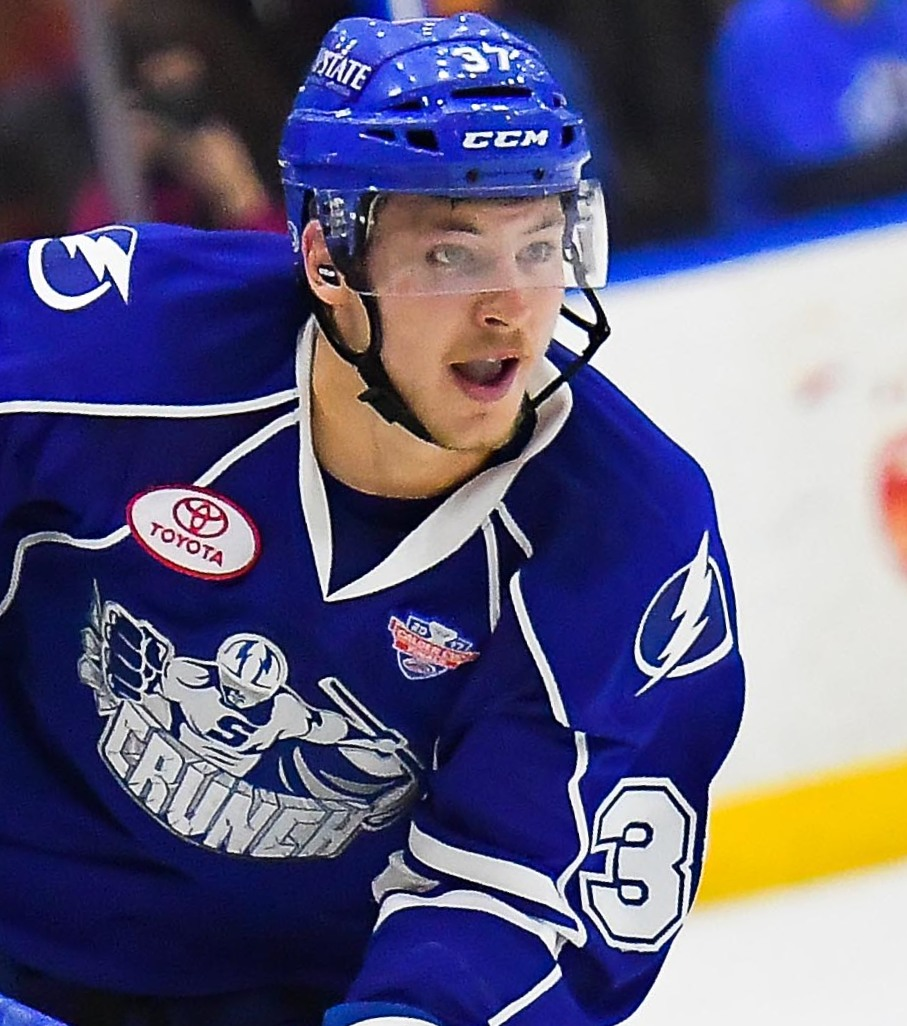
Gourde with the Crunch during the 2017 Calder Cup Final

After posting 26 points in 29 games to start the 2016–17 season, Gourde was recalled by the Lightning on December 29, 2016. On January 4, 2017, he was returned to the Crunch after playing two games with the Lightning. Two days later, he was named to represent the Crunch at the 2017 AHL All-Star Classic. Gourde was once again recalled by the Lightning on March 6. On March 11, against the Florida Panthers, he scored his first NHL goal, shorthanded. In doing so, he became the fourth Lightning player to score his first career goal shorthanded. On April 10, he was returned to the Crunch after having totaled six goals and eight points through 20 games with the Lightning during both stints. Gourde ended the regular season with the Crunch tallying 26 goals and 48 points in 56 games. During the 2017 Calder Cup playoffs, the Crunch reached the Calder Cup Final, facing off against the Grand Rapids Griffins. In game six of the series, Gourde scored two goals. However, the Griffins won the game 4–3, clinching the Calder Cup. Gourde totaled nine goals and 27 points during the playoffs, his points ranking second behind fellow Crunch player Cory Conacher and his 18 assists ranking first in the league. On June 26, 2017, the Lightning announced they had signed Gourde to a two-year, US$2,000,000 contract extension.

During the 2017–18 season, Gourde was named the NHL Rookie of the Month for February. On March 6, 2018, Gourde recorded two goals in a 5–4 overtime victory over the Florida Panthers. His two-goal effort tied him with Tyler Johnson for the most goals during a rookie season by a Lightning player. On March 30, Gourde moved past Ondřej Palát (59) for the second-most points in a season by a Lightning rookie. On April 6, Gourde recorded one goal and two assists in a 7–5 win over the Buffalo Sabres. The goal moved Gourde past Tyler Johnson for most goals by a Lightning rookie, with 25. Gourde also passed Brad Richards for the most points in a season by a Lightning rookie, with 64. On April 12, Gourde made his Stanley Cup playoff debut in a 5–2 home win against the New Jersey Devils. He recorded his first career playoff goal and assist in the Lightning victory, becoming the second player in Lightning history to have a multi-point game in his playoff debut. He ended the 2018 Stanley Cup playoffs with two goals and five assists through 17 games.

On November 2, 2018, the Lightning signed Gourde to a six-year, US$31,000,000 contract extension. On March 22, 2019, he was suspended for two games for an illegal check to the head of Carolina Hurricanes captain Jordan Staal the previous night. Gourde finished the 2018–19 season with 22 goals and 26 assists for 48 points, including five game-winning goals, the same amount as the previous season. During four games of the 2019 Stanley Cup playoffs, he scored one goal.

During the 2019–20 season, Gourde notched 10 goals and 20 assists in 70 games. In the 2020 Stanley Cup playoffs, he tallied seven goals and seven assists through 25 games. That year, the Lightning won the 2020 Stanley Cup Final over the Dallas Stars, making Gourde a Stanley Cup champion. In 56 games of the 2020–21 season, Gourde collected 17 goals and 19 assists, his goal total tied for second on the team. Through 23 games of the 2021 Stanley Cup playoffs, he managed six goals and one assist. That season, he and the Lightning repeated as Stanley Cup champions, defeating the Montreal Canadiens in the 2021 Stanley Cup Final.

=== Seattle Kraken ===
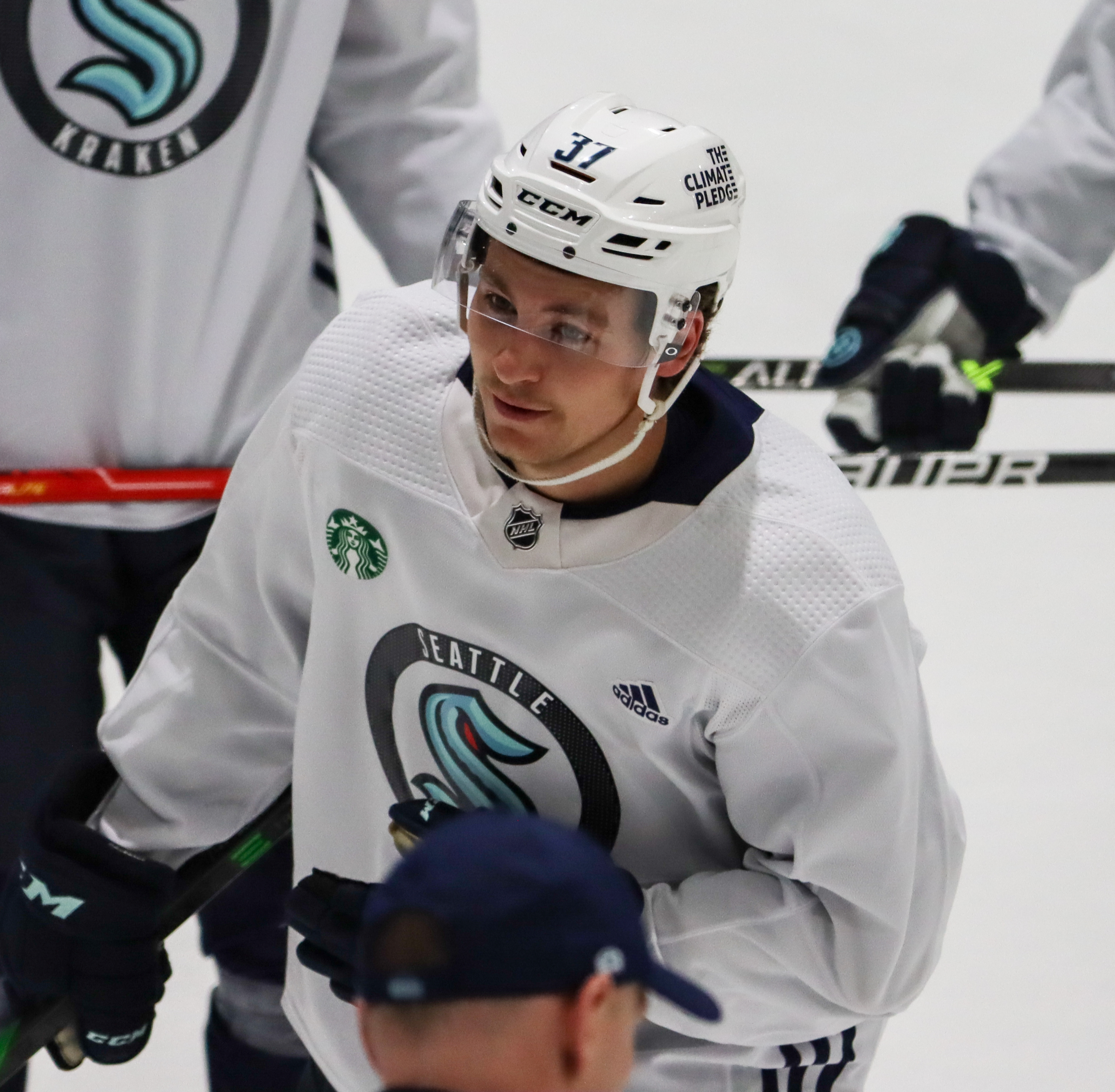
Gourde practicing with the Kraken in 2022 during their inaugural season

On July 21, 2021, Gourde was selected from the Lightning in the 2021 NHL expansion draft by the Seattle Kraken. Following the draft, it was announced that Gourde was expected to miss the first two months of the 2021–22 season to recover from shoulder surgery. While sidelined, Gourde was named an alternate captain for the Kraken alongside Jordan Eberle, Adam Larsson, and Jaden Schwartz. He eventually made his season debut on October 19, where he played on the team's top line with Schwartz and Eberle against the New Jersey Devils. Gourde scored his first goal with the Kraken on October 26, against the Montreal Canadiens, as part of the team's first home win. He finished the season with 21 goals and 27 assists through 74 games.

Gourde maintained his point total for the 2022–23 season, notching 48 points. In the 2022 Stanley Cup playoffs, Gourde scored an overtime goal against the Dallas Stars during the second round, giving the Kraken a 5–4 win and a 1–0 series lead. However, the Kraken went on to lose the series to the Stars in seven games, getting eliminated from the playoffs. During the 2023–24 season, he totaled lesser numbers, managing 11 goals and 22 assists for 33 points in 80 games.

On January 31, 2025, during the 2024–25 season, it was announced that Gourde would miss from five to seven weeks due to surgery for a sports hernia. Prior injury, he had played in 35 games, registering six goals and 10 assists. After recovering, he played one more game, also registering an assist.

=== Return to Tampa Bay ===
On March 5, 2025, Gourde was traded back to Tampa Bay alongside teammate Oliver Bjorkstrand as part of a three-team deal. Tampa Bay also received Kyle Aucoin from the Detroit Red Wings, who retained half of Gourde's salary, and the Kraken received Mikey Eyssimont. In 21 games with the Lightning to end the season, Gourde tallied one goal and 13 assists. On June 2, the Lightning signed him to a six-year, US$13,980,000 contract.

== Personal life ==
Gourde was named after the Greek composer Yanni. His parents saw the artist's name in the credits of a movie they had watched while his mother was pregnant with him, which resulted in them deciding to give him the first name Yanni.

Gourde and his wife Marie-Andrée had their first child, Emma Kate Gourde, on May 1, 2018. Her birth came between games two and three of the 2018 Stanley Cup playoffs.

== Career statistics ==
			Regular season					Playoffs
Season	Team	League	GP	G	A	Pts	PIM	GP	G	A	Pts	PIM
2007–08	Lévis Commandeurs	QMAAA	2	0	0	0	0	—	—	—	—	—
2008–09	Jonquière Élites	QMAAA	41	23	30	53	50	4	1	5	6	6
2008–09	Victoriaville Tigres	QMJHL	4	0	1	1	0	—	—	—	—	—
2009–10	Victoriaville Tigres	QMJHL	59	11	17	28	36	16	2	3	5	20
2010–11	Victoriaville Tigres	QMJHL	68	26	42	68	48	9	4	6	10	12
2011–12	Victoriaville Tigres	QMJHL	68	37	87	124	70	4	1	2	3	6
2011–12	Worcester Sharks	AHL	4	1	2	3	6	—	—	—	—	—
2012–13	Worcester Sharks	AHL	54	8	6	14	41	—	—	—	—	—
2012–13	San Francisco Bulls	ECHL	8	4	6	10	9	—	—	—	—	—
2013–14	Kalamazoo Wings	ECHL	30	15	19	34	19	—	—	—	—	—
2013–14	Worcester Sharks	AHL	25	4	20	24	26	—	—	—	—	—
2013–14	Syracuse Crunch	AHL	18	2	6	8	16	—	—	—	—	—
2014–15	Syracuse Crunch	AHL	76	29	28	57	61	3	1	1	2	10
2015–16	Syracuse Crunch	AHL	65	14	30	44	42	—	—	—	—	—
2015–16	Tampa Bay Lightning	NHL	2	0	1	1	2	—	—	—	—	—
2016–17	Syracuse Crunch	AHL	56	22	26	48	54	22	9	18	27	29
2016–17	Tampa Bay Lightning	NHL	20	6	2	8	8	—	—	—	—	—
2017–18	Tampa Bay Lightning	NHL	82	25	39	64	50	17	2	5	7	8
2018–19	Tampa Bay Lightning	NHL	80	22	26	48	66	4	1	0	1	0
2019–20	Tampa Bay Lightning	NHL	70	10	20	30	49	25	7	7	14	19
2020–21	Tampa Bay Lightning	NHL	56	17	19	36	44	23	6	1	7	13
2021–22	Seattle Kraken	NHL	74	21	27	48	45	—	—	—	—	—
2022–23	Seattle Kraken	NHL	81	14	34	48	76	14	4	9	13	14
2023–24	Seattle Kraken	NHL	80	11	22	33	62	—	—	—	—	—
2024–25	Seattle Kraken	NHL	36	6	11	17	36	—	—	—	—	—
2024–25	Tampa Bay Lightning	NHL	21	1	13	14	16	5	0	1	1	0
2025–26	Tampa Bay Lightning	NHL	82	9	19	28	66	7	0	1	1	10
NHL totals			684	142	233	375	520	95	20	24	44	64

== Awards and honours ==
Award	Year	Ref
QMJHL
Jean Béliveau Trophy	2012	
Michel Brière Memorial Trophy	2012	
First All-Star Team	2012	
NHL
Rookie of the Month	February 2018	
Stanley Cup champion	2020, 2021	

== Records ==
- Most points by a Tampa Bay Lightning rookie, 64 (2017–18)
- Most goals by a Tampa Bay Lightning rookie, 25 (2017–18)
