= John Griggs =

John Griggs may refer to:

- John B. Griggs, American World War II submarine officer, commander of USS Dolphin (SS-169)
- J. D. Griggs (born 1990), American football player
- John W. Griggs (1849–1927), American politician, governor of New Jersey

== See also ==
- John Grigg (disambiguation)
