= Judith Griggs =

Australian lawyer, business executive

Judith Griggs (born April 1959) is an Australian lawyer, business executive, active in entertainment and sports rights management. She is the co-founder of Sports Rights Management, based in London.

== Early life and education ==
Griggs graduated in law from the University of Adelaide. She attended the Harvard Business School six-week Advanced Management Program.

== Career ==
Between 1989 and 1994, she worked in Formula One, involved in Promotions and Administration in London. She also managed Formula 1 and World Motorcycle race promotion contracts and broadcast rights.

Griggs was the first CEO of the Australian Grand Prix Corporation in Melbourne and is a minority shareholder in Formula 1's holding company, Delta Topco.

In 1996, Griggs was named Australian Business Woman of the Year in the public sector category at the Telstra Business Women’s Awards.

Between 1998 and 2013, Griggs was COO of Allsport Management SA, which managed all aspects of trackside advertising, the VIP Paddock Club activities, merchandising and product licensing and other commercial aspects of the sport.

In February 2015, Judith founded Sports Rights Management with British entertainment entrepreneur, Charles Garland. She is also a Board Member of the South Australian Tourism Commission and former member of the Global Advisory Board of South Australia's Investment Attraction Agency.

In 2018, Griggs was appointed as the independent chairperson of the Football Federation Australia Congress Review Working Group, which reported to FIFA on governance changes of Football Federation Australia.
