= George Griggs =

- Origin: New York
- Genres: Musical theatre
- Occupations: Composer, lyricist
- Instruments: guitar, piano, keyboard
- Years active: 2005 to present
- Label: Original Cast Recordings

George Griggs is a New York-based composer and lyricist for musical theatre.

In 2007 the Infinity Repertory Company produced his score MOD: A Musical Pop-toon! for the Edinburgh Fringe Festival. Before Edinburgh, the show enjoyed performances in NYC at 59E59 Theaters during the East to Edinburgh Festival (July 2007). MOD was also selected for the ASCAP Music Theatre Workshop (directed by Stephen Schwartz). Previous commissions for the stage include Hearts Are Wild with The City Theater in Pittsburgh, PA, Heat Lightning at Kirk Theater, NYC, and A Midsummer Night's Dream: A Rock Opera with the Infinity Theater Company. His rock "radio play", Transmitter Man, produced by Todd Tobias (Guided By Voices, Robert Pollard) was released in 2007. George Griggs also works with New York University's Tisch School of the Arts, and as composer/lyricist-in-residence at Yale University. His work at Yale includes the American premiere of Dario Fo's About Face.

Griggs began his career in the 1970s as lead singer and songwriter for the rock band, Shobiz, touring as an opening act with Aerosmith, Twisted Sister, Southside Johnny and The Asbury Jukes, Rick Derringer, The Motels, Talking Heads, Joan Jett, The Ramones among others.

== Shows ==
- MOD: A Musical Pop-Toon! (2007)
- Heat Lightning (2006)
- A Midsummer Night's Dream: A Rock Opera (2005)

== Discography ==
- TRANSMITTER MAN: A Radio Rock Play (2007, Original Cast Recordings)
- Heat Lightning (2006, Original cast Recordings)
- A Midsummer Night's Dream: A Rock Opera (2005, Original Cast Recordings)
