= Hubert E. Griggs =

American politician (1906–1964)

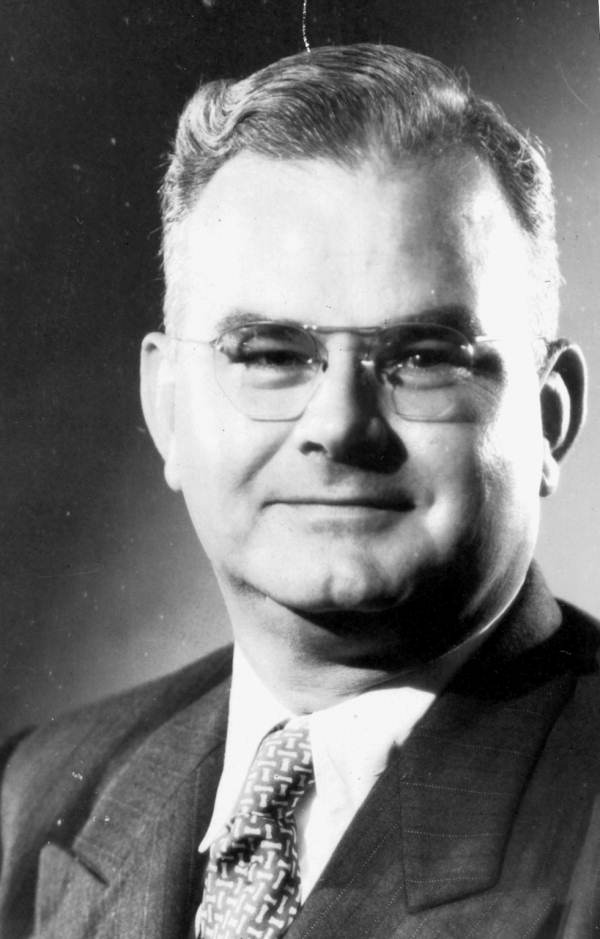
- Griggs in 1949

Member of the Florida House of Representatives from Brevard County
- In office 1949

Personal details
- Born: May 11, 1906
- Died: January 30, 1964 (aged 57)
- Party: Democratic
- Education: University of Florida Levin College of Law

Hubert E. Griggs (May 11, 1906 – January 30, 1964) was an American politician. He served as a Democratic member of the Florida House of Representatives. He also served as mayor of Cocoa, Florida.

== Life and career ==
Griggs attended the University of Florida Levin College of Law.

Griggs served in the Florida House of Representatives in 1949.

Griggs died on January 30, 1964, at the age of 57.
