= Orrin Harold Griggs =

American politician

Orrin Harold Griggs (September 23, 1883 – July 4, 1958) was an American lawyer and politician.

Griggs was born in Barclay, Bradford County, Pennsylvania. He moved to Virginia, Minnesota in 1893 and then moved to Minneapolis, Minnesota in 1918. Griggs then moved to Hollywood, Los Angeles in Los Angeles, California in 1924. Griggs received his law degree from University of Minnesota Law School in 1904 and was admitted to the Minnesota bar. He had lived in Virginia, Minnesota with his wife and family and practiced law in Virginia, Minnesota. He helped with the development of the Iron Ridge in Minnesota. Griggs served in the Minnesota Senate from 1915 to 1918. He then served in the American Red Cross during World War I. Griggs died in Hollywood, Los Angeles in Los Angeles.
