= William Griggs =

William or Bill Griggs may refer to:

- William Griggs (physician), doctor involved in Salem witch trials
- William Griggs (inventor) (1832–1911), English inventor of a process of photolithography
- Bill Griggs (born 1950s), Australian trauma and emergency medical retrieval doctor
- Billy Griggs (American football) (born 1962)
- Billy Griggs (born 1968), BMX racer
- Will Griggs, fictional character in Neighbours

== See also ==
- William Grigg (disambiguation)
