= David Griggs =

David Griggs may refer to:

- David Griggs (American football) (1967–1995), American football linebacker in the National Football League
- S. David Griggs (1939–1989), American astronaut
- David T. Griggs (1911–1974), American geophysicist
- David Griggs (artist), Australian artist whose work featured in ArtExpress in 1994
