= Murder of Debbie Griggs =

1999 murder in Deal, England

Deborah Elizabeth Griggs
- Born: 10 December 1964; Deal, England
- Died: 5 May 1999 (aged 34)
- Cause of death: Undetermined (homicide)
- Known for: Murder victim
- Partner: Andrew Griggs

Debbie Griggs was a 34-year-old woman who disappeared from her family home in Deal, England, on 5 May 1999. She was married to Andrew Griggs and was pregnant at the time of her disappearance.

== Investigations and trial ==
At the time of her disappearance, Griggs had three sons with her husband Andrew and was pregnant with her fourth child. Andrew had previously claimed to relatives, medical professionals, and neighbours that Debbie had been struggling with postpartum depression (a claim which she wrote in her diary was false) and was not compliant with medications. A day after her disappearance, Andrew told police that Debbie had depression and had "stormed out"; as a result, her disappearance was initially treated as a missing persons case. Though Andrew later became an initial suspect in the police's investigation into her disappearance, prosecutors at the time were not trained on matters of domestic abuse, and the Crown Prosecution Service found in 2003 that the evidence submitted to them offered "no realistic prospect of conviction".

A new investigation began in 2018, upon which Andrew was later charged and found guilty of murder following a trial held at Canterbury Crown Court. Griggs was handed a life sentence with a minimum tariff of 20 years. The trial heard that Andrew was in a sexual relationship with a 15-year-old girl, which Debbie was unhappy about and unwilling to cover for him. If they were to divorce, Andrew may have lost half of their shared business; the prosecution proposed that this "was a reason why he may have wanted to be rid of her".

== Discovery of remains ==
Her remains were discovered in 2022 after a tip-off to police. Her remains were found in the back garden of a house in St Leonards, Dorset where her husband had moved to after the initial investigation.

== See also ==
- Lists of solved missing person cases
