= Steve Griggs =

Canadian sports executive

- Born: Canada
- Occupations: President and CEO
- Years active: 2014 – present
- Employer: Tampa Bay Lightning
- Organization: National Hockey League
- Children: Jack Griggs, Maddie Griggs,

Steve Griggs is a Canadian sports executive. He currently serves as the president and CEO of the Tampa Bay Lightning of the National Hockey League. (NHL).
