= List of NHL on-ice officials =

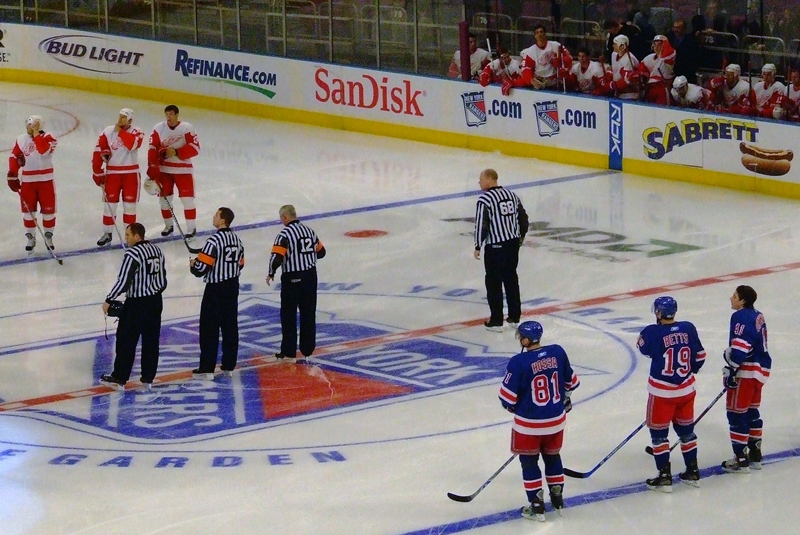
Officials, from left to right: Michel Cormier (linesman), Eric Furlatt (referee), Don Koharski (referee), and Scott Driscoll (linesman) stand at centre ice for the national anthem before a game in Madison Square Garden between the Detroit Red Wings and New York Rangers.

In ice hockey, an official is responsible for enforcing the rules and maintaining order. On-ice officials are present on the ice during the game, and traditionally wear a shirt with black and white vertical stripes. The National Hockey League (NHL) currently employs four on-ice officials in each game—two referees and two linespersons (also known as linesmen). (Note: The title of linesman was changed to linesperson as of the 2023–24 NHL season.) Referees are identified by their red or orange armbands. They are responsible for the general supervision of the game, assess penalties, and conduct face-offs at the beginning of each period and after a goal is scored. When play is stopped for another reason, the face-offs are conducted by the linesmen. The linesmen are primarily responsible for violations involving the centre line and blue lines, such as icing and offside infractions.

NHL officials wear identifying numbers on the back of their jerseys. From the 1977–78 season until the 1993–94 season, they wore name bars instead of numbers.

== Current officials ==
Notes:
- #35 (referee) and #85 (linesman) are spare numbers; they are not issued to anyone, and are only worn in the event that a game-assigned official's equipment is lost in transit.
- #72 is retired in honor of late linesman Stephane Provost, who died in 2005.
- #99 was retired league-wide in 2000 to honour Wayne Gretzky.
- † indicates an official on an NHL/AHL minor league contract.
Roster source:

Referees

- CAN 12 – Cody Beach
- CAN 42 – Ben Betker †
- USA 39 – Brandon Blandina
- CAN 49 – Riley Brace †
- USA 26 – Jake Brenk
- CAN 6 – Francis Charron
- USA 18 – Tom Chmielewski
- CAN 20 – Mitch Dunning
- CAN 19 – Gord Dwyer
- CAN 27 – Eric Furlatt
- CAN 48 – Beaudry Halkidis †
- CAN 41 – Graedy Hamilton †
- CAN 14 – Trevor Hanson
- CAN 15 – Jean Hebert
- CAN 46 – Stephen Hiff †
- CAN 36 – Justin Kea
- CAN 40 – Steve Kozari
- CAN 25 – Pierre Lambert
- CAN 17 – Frederick L'Ecuyer
- CAN 28 – Chris Lee
- USA 44 – Alex Lepkowski
- CAN 21 – TJ Luxmore
- CAN 45 – Liam Maaskant †
- CAN 38 – Peter MacDougall
- CAN 43 – Morgan MacPhee †
- CAN 31 – Michael Markovic
- CAN 4 – Wes McCauley
- CAN 2 – Jon McIsaac
- CAN 30 – Kendrick Nicholson
- CAN 9 – Dan O'Rourke
- USA 16 – Brian Pochmara
- CAN 7 – Garrett Rank
- CAN 10 – Kyle Rehman
- USA 5 – Chris Rooney
- USA 37 – Jordan Samuels-Thomas
- CAN 29 – Carter Sandlak
- CAN 3 – Chris Schlenker
- USA 34 – Brandon Schrader
- CAN 24 – Graham Skilliter
- USA 13 – Furman South
- CAN 8 – François St-Laurent
- CAN 47 – Michael Sullivan †
- CAN 11 – Kelly Sutherland
- CAN 23 – Corey Syvret

Linesmen

- CAN 52 – Shandor Alphonso
- CAN 77 – Caleb Apperson
- CAN 88 – Tyson Baker
- CAN 59 – Steve Barton
- CAN 87 – Devin Berg
- USA 57 – Dylan Blujus †
- CAN 96 – David Brisebois
- CAN 50 – Scott Cherrey
- CAN 76 – Michel Cormier
- USA 81 – Ryan Daisy
- CAN 80 – Jonathan Deschamps
- CAN 97 – Jeremy Faucher †
- CAN 55 – Kyle Flemington
- CAN 56 – Julien Fournier
- CAN 64 – Brandon Gawryletz
- CAN 67 – Travis Gawryletz
- CAN 58 – Ryan Gibbons
- USA 75 – Brandon Grillo †
- CAN 65 – Tommy Hughes
- CAN 84 – Ryan Jackson
- USA 98 – Dan Kelly
- CAN 74 – Trent Knorr
- CAN 71 – Brad Kovachik
- CAN 83 – Matt MacPherson
- CAN 89 – Joseph Mahon
- CAN 86 – Jesse Marquis
- USA 93 – Kilian McNamara
- CAN 53 – Bevan Mills
- CAN 79 – Kiel Murchison
- USA 68 – CJ Murray
- CAN 95 – Jonny Murray
- CAN 91 – Ben O'Quinn
- CAN 66 – Shawn Oliver †
- USA 94 – Bryan Pancich
- CAN 92 – Mark Shewchyk
- CAN 51 – Andrew Smith
- CZE 60 – Libor Suchanek
- USA 61 – James Tobias
- CAN 90 – Travis Toomey

== Former NHL officials ==
- USA Don Adam
- CAN Derek Amell
- (Canada) Reid Anderson
- (Canada) Blaine Angus
- (Canada) Neil Armstrong - Deceased
- ENG Malcolm Ashford
- (Canada) George Ashley (October 14, 1941 – April 8, 2024) – Deceased
- (Canada) John Ashley – Deceased
- (Canada) Ron Asselstine
- (Canada) Stephane Auger
- (Canada) Charlie Banfield
- (Canada) David Banfield
- (Canada) Bill Beagan
- (Canada) Claude Bechard (November 2, 1938 – July 5, 2007) – Deceased
- (Canada) Bob Best
- (Canada) Ken Bodendistel (1940 – November 21, 2013) – Deceased
- (Canada) Wayne Bonney
- (Canada) Ryan Bozak
- (United States) Gord Broseker
- (Canada) John Brown
- (Canada) Vern Buffey (December 26, 1928 – September 11, 1990) – Deceased
- (Canada) Darcy Burchell
- (Canada) Lonnie Cameron
- (Canada) Brent Casselman
- (United States) Bill Chadwick – Deceased
- (Canada) Pierre Champoux
- (Canada) Jim Christison (September 13, 1946 – November 30, 2016) – Deceased
- (United States) Chris Ciamaga
- (Canada) King Clancy – Deceased
- (Canada) David Clutsam
- (United States) Kevin Collins
- (Canada) Mike Cvik
- (Canada) Angelo D'Amico
- (Canada) John D'Amico – Deceased
- (United States) Pat Dapuzzo
- (Canada) Bernard DeGrace
- (Canada) Greg Devorski
- (Canada) Paul Devorski
- (United States) Steve Dowling
- (United States) James Doyle
- (Canada) Scott Driscoll
- (Canada) Ron Ego
- (Canada) Chaucer Elliott – Deceased
- (United States) Joe Ernst
- (United States) Mark Faucette
- (Canada) Ron Finn
- (United States) Paul Flaherty
- (Canada) Wayne Forsey
- (Canada) Ron Fournier
- (Canada) Bob Frampton – Deceased
- (Canada) Kerry Fraser
- (Canada) Bill Friday — Deceased
- (Canada) Ryan Galloway
- (Canada) Gerard Gauthier
- (Canada) Doug Geiger
- (Canada) Darren Gibbs
- (United States) Roger Gilbertson
- (Canada) Lloyd Gilmour (August 19, 1927 – August 11, 2010) – Deceased
- (United States) John Grandt
- (Canada) Terry Gregson
- (Canada) Conrad Hache
- (Canada) Bob Hall
- (Canada) Ron Harris – Deceased
- (Canada) Wally Harris — Deceased
- (Canada) Mike Hasenfratz — Deceased
- (Canada) George Hayes – Deceased
- (Canada) Don Henderson
- (Canada) Ghislain Hebert
- (United States) Bob Henry
- (Canada) Bobby Hewitson – Deceased
- (Canada) Shane Heyer
- (Canada) Scott Hoberg
- (Canada) Bob Hodges
- (Canada) Ron Hoggarth
- (Canada) Bruce Hood – Deceased
- (United States) Mitchell Hunt
- (Canada) Mickey Ion – Deceased
- (Canada) Dave Jackson
- (Canada) Marc Joannette
- (Canada) Justin Johnson
- (Canada) Greg Kimmerly
- (Canada) Swede Knox – Deceased
- (Canada) Don Koharski
- (Canada) Tom Kowal
- (Canada) Bob Langdon
- (United States) Dennis LaRue
- (Canada) Brad Lazarowich
- (Canada) Mike Leggo
- (Canada) Alfie LeJeune (September 19, 1945 – October 17, 2012) – Deceased
- (United States) Mark Lemelin
- (Canada) Bryan Lewis
- (Canada) Dave Lewis
- (United States) Bob Luther
- (United States) Brian Mach
- (Canada) Dan Marouelli
- (Canada) Rob Martell
- (Canada) Bill McCreary
- (Canada) John McCauley – Deceased
- (Canada) Dan McCourt - Deceased
- (United States) Andy McElman
- (Canada) Michael McGeough – Deceased
- (United States) Pat Meehan
- (United States) Brad Meier
- (Canada) Steve Miller
- (Canada) Randy Mitton
- (Canada) Denis Morel
- (Canada) Jean Morin
- (Canada) Dean Morton
- (United States) Brian Murphy
- (Canada) Bob Myers
- (Canada) Kory Nagy
- (Canada) Derek Nansen
- (United States) Thor Nelson
- (Canada) Dave Newell (February 25, 1945 – December 16, 2018) – Deceased
- (United States) Mike Noeth (Note: Noeth was hired to NHL contract at age 20, at that time the youngest referee ever hired by the NHL.)
- (Canada) Will Norris (died April 2025)
- (United States) Tim Nowak
- (Canada) Conor O'Donnell
- (Canada) Dan O'Halloran
- (Canada) Mark Pare
- (United States) Dennis Parish
- (Canada) Baron Parker
- NLD Jerry Pateman
- (Canada) Matt Pavelich
- (Canada) Tim Peel
- (Canada) Kevin Pollock
- (Canada) Stephane Provost – Deceased
- (Canada) Pierre Racicot
- (Canada) Lance Roberts
- (Canada) Mike Rodden – Deceased
- (Canada) Vaughan Rody
- RUS Evgeny Romasko
- (Canada) Ian Sandercock
- (Canada) Troy Sartison
- (Canada) Ray Scapinello
- (United States) Dan Schachte – Deceased
- (Canada) Jay Sharrers
- (Canada) Lyle Seitz
- (United States) Anthony Sericolo
- (Canada) Jamie Seward
- (Canada) Randy Shantz
- (Canada) Pat Shetler
- (Canada) Harry David Shewchyk
- (Canada) Rob Shick
- (Canada) Sam Sisco
- (Canada) Art Skov – Deceased
- (Canada) Cooper Smeaton – Deceased
- (Canada) (United States) Ag Smith – Deceased
- (Canada) Craig Spada
- (United States) Paul Stewart
- (Canada) Leon Stickle - Deceased
- (Canada) Red Storey – Deceased
- (Canada) Justin St. Pierre
- (Canada) Ted Topping (September 27, 1923 – May 24, 2016) – Deceased
- (Canada) Richard Trottier
- (Canada) Frank Udvari
- (Canada) Andy Van Hellemond
- (Canada) Don Van Massenhoven
- (Canada) Mark Vines
- SWE Marcus Vinnerborg
- (United States) Cameron Voss
- (Canada) Stephen Walkom
- (United States) Ian Walsh
- (Canada) Dean Warren
- (Canada) Brad Watson
- (Canada) Ken Wheler
- (Canada) Mark Wheler
- (Canada) Ron Wicks – Deceased
- (United States) Scott Zelkin

== Officials in the Hockey Hall of Fame ==
Year inducted	Name	Nationality
1958	King Clancy (Note: Inducted as a player.)	Canada
1961	Chaucer Elliott	(Canada)
1961	Mickey Ion	(Canada)
1961	Cooper Smeaton	(Canada)
1962	Mike Rodden	(Canada)
1963	Bobby Hewitson	(Canada)
1964	Bill Chadwick	United States
1967	Red Storey	(Canada)
1973	Frank Udvari	(Canada)
1981	John Ashley	(Canada)
1987	Matt Pavelich	(Canada)
1988	George Hayes	(Canada)
1991	Neil Armstrong	(Canada)
1993	John D'Amico	(Canada)
1999	Andy Van Hellemond	(Canada)
1999	Scotty Morrison (Note: Inducted as a builder.)	(Canada)
2008	Ray Scapinello	(Canada)
2014	Bill McCreary	(Canada)
