= Dan Kelly (ice hockey) =

American ice hockey player and official (born 1989)

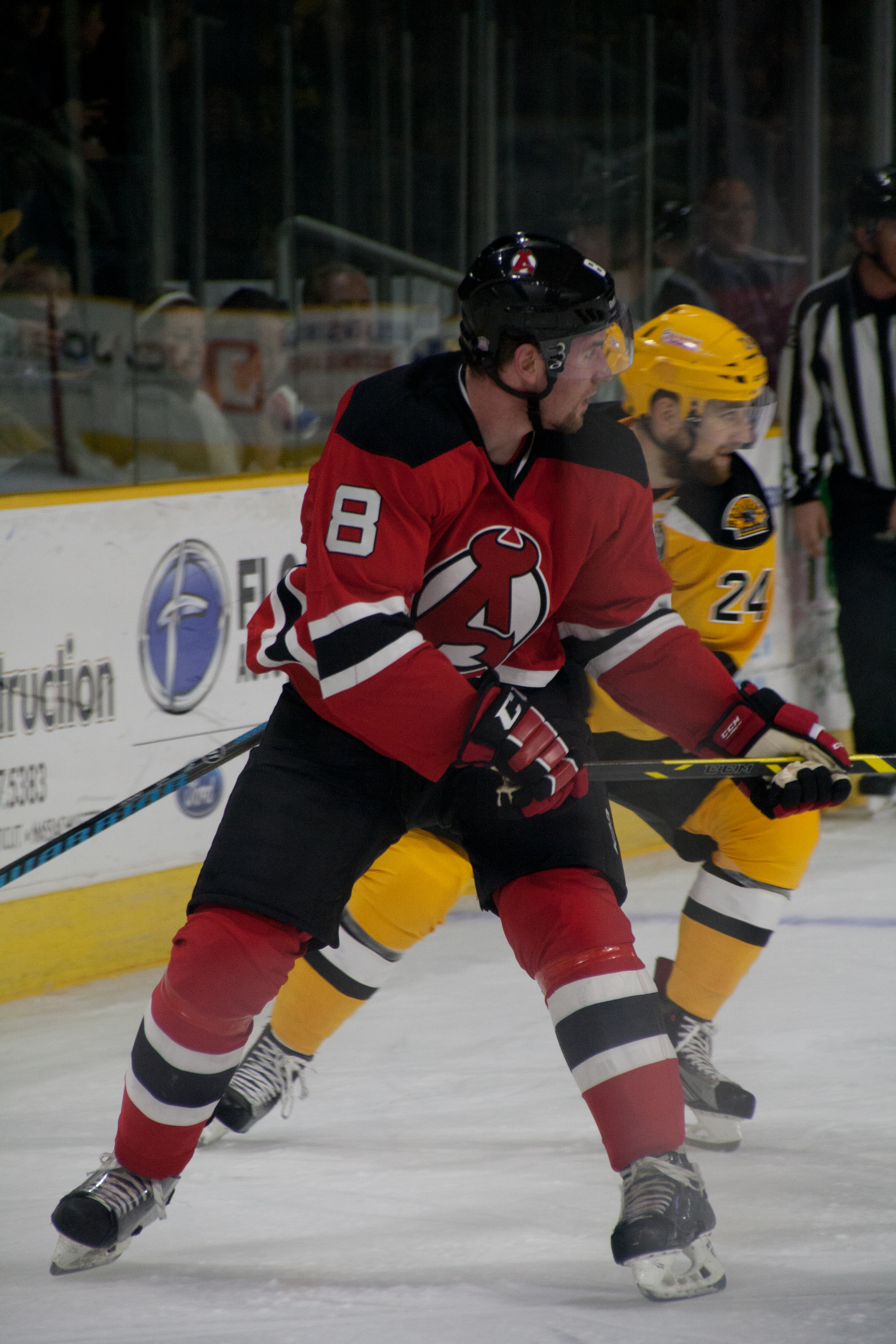
- Kelly with the Albany Devils in 2015
- Born: May 17, 1989 (age 37); Morrisonville, New York, US
- Occupation: Ice hockey linesman
- Years active: 2021–present
- Employer: National Hockey League
Ice hockey career
- Height: 6 ft 1 in (185 cm)
- Weight: 215 lb (98 kg; 15 st 5 lb)
- Position: Defence
- Shot: Left
- Played for: Albany Devils; San Jose Barracuda
- NHL draft: Undrafted
- Playing career: 2010–2017

Dan Kelly (born May 17, 1989) is an American ice hockey linesman and former professional ice hockey defenceman currently officiating in the National Hockey League. He most recently played under contract with the NHL's San Jose Sharks in 2017. As of the start of the 2024–25 season, he has officiated 215 regular season games. He wears uniform number 98.

== Playing career ==
Kelly was drafted by the Kitchener Rangers in the third round of the 2005 Ontario Hockey League draft. He was named captain midway through the 2008–09 season.

On May 19, 2010, Kelly was signed by the New Jersey Devils as a free agent. On August 30, 2014, Kelly was re-signed to a two-year, two-way $1.1 million contract with the Devils. On May 12, 2016, Kelly was assessed a ten-game suspension by the American Hockey League for an illegal check to the head of Toronto Marlies forward Andreas Johnson during a playoff game.

Kelly spent the duration of his six-year tenure within the Devils organization, with AHL affiliate, the Albany Devils. On July 11, 2016, having left the New Jersey Devils as a free agent, Kelly agreed to a one-year, two-way contract with the San Jose Sharks. After retiring from hockey following the 2016–17 season, Kelly joined the Kitchener Dutchmen as a coach.

== Officiating career ==
Prior to the start of the 2019–20 NHL season, Kelly signed an officiating deal with the National Hockey League. He made his debut on January 28, 2021, at the Prudential Center for a game between the Philadelphia Flyers and the New Jersey Devils. He was joined by linesman Devin Berg, and referees Frederick L'Ecuyer and Pierre Lambert.

== Career statistics ==
			Regular season					Playoffs
Season	Team	League	GP	G	A	Pts	PIM	GP	G	A	Pts	PIM
2004–05	Pembroke Lumber Kings	CJHL	50	2	12	14	80	—	—	—	—	—
2005–06	Pembroke Lumber Kings	CJHL	44	2	16	18	85	11	0	3	3	16
2005–06	Kitchener Rangers	OHL	9	0	3	3	8	—	—	—	—	—
2006–07	Kitchener Rangers	OHL	59	0	19	19	79	9	1	1	2	10
2007–08	Kitchener Rangers	OHL	65	1	17	18	61	8	0	2	2	4
2008–09	Kitchener Rangers	OHL	44	4	11	15	30	—	—	—	—	—
2009–10	Kitchener Rangers	OHL	58	6	21	27	99	20	4	9	13	23
2010–11	Albany Devils	AHL	61	2	5	7	71	—	—	—	—	—
2011–12	Albany Devils	AHL	54	2	4	6	93	—	—	—	—	—
2012–13	Albany Devils	AHL	47	2	6	8	62	—	—	—	—	—
2013–14	Albany Devils	AHL	71	3	14	17	86	1	0	0	0	2
2014–15	Albany Devils	AHL	64	1	10	11	130	—	—	—	—	—
2015–16	Albany Devils	AHL	55	4	11	15	93	8	1	2	3	21
2016–17	San Jose Barracuda	AHL	53	1	6	7	116	6	0	1	1	7
AHL totals			405	15	56	71	651	15	1	3	4	30

== See also ==
- List of NHL on-ice officials
