= Steve Kozari =

Canadian ice hockey referee

- Born: June 20, 1973 (age 52); Penticton, British Columbia, Canada
- Occupation: Ice hockey referee
- Years active: 2005–present
- Employer: National Hockey League

Steve Kozari (born June 20, 1973) is a Canadian National Hockey League referee, who wears uniform number 40. He made his debut during the 2005–06 NHL season, and has officiated 1,218 regular season games as of the start of the 2024–25 season. He has also worked 153 playoff games, including five Stanley Cup Final appearances. Prior to starting his professional career, he refereed a Memorial Cup and was the recipient of the Allen Paradice Memorial Trophy as the Western Hockey League’s top on-ice official during the 2002–03 season.

== Early life ==
Steve Kozari was born in 1973, to parents Steve and Debbie in Penticton, British Columbia. He grew up in Penticton with his sister, and graduated from Penticton Secondary School. Kozari started officiating minor hockey in his hometown at the age of 12, and worked his way up to junior hockey. He was a referee in the British Columbia Hockey League, and then in the WHL where he would remain for ten seasons. Following the 2002–03 WHL season, Kozari received the Allen Paradice Memorial Trophy, and was assigned to the 2003 Memorial Cup in Quebec City, Quebec.

== Career ==
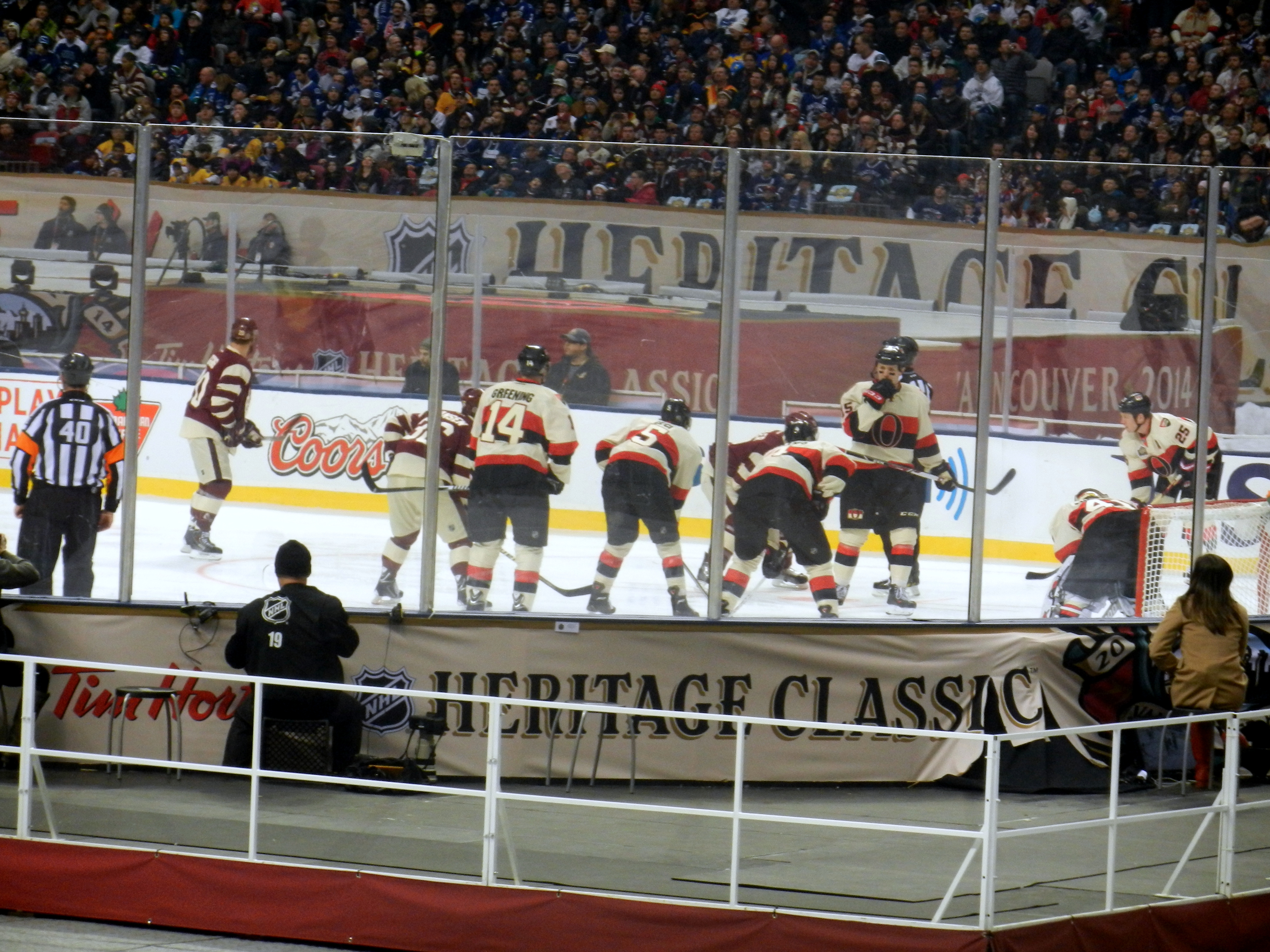
Kozari (left) preparing for a faceoff during the 2014 Heritage Classic at BC Place

Kozari has been a member of the NHL Officials Association since the 2003–04 NHL season. His first game was between the Nashville Predators and the St. Louis Blues on October 15, 2005, at the Savvis Center. He worked the game with referee Dean Warren, and linesmen Tim Nowak and Mark Shewchyk. He was promoted to full-time NHL referee in 2007. Kozari’s first playoff assignment was game one of the 2010 Eastern Conference quarterfinal between the Pittsburgh Penguins and the Ottawa Senators.

He officiated his 1,000th game on October 22, 2021, at T-Mobile Arena between the Edmonton Oilers and the Vegas Golden Knights. The officials for the game represented leagues that Kozari worked in; as Kyle Rehman worked games with him in the WHL, Scott Cherrey worked with him in the American Hockey League, and Mark Shewchyk joined him on his NHL debut.

Kozari was selected for his first Stanley Cup Final in 2014, and has since officiated the 2019, 2020, 2023 and 2024 Stanley Cup Final series. He also participated in the 2014 Heritage Classic, the 2016 Stadium Series, the 2020 Winter Classic, and the 2022 NHL All-Star Game. In 2021, when asked about his future as an NHL referee, he responded that "[his] last game will be in Vancouver…whenever that is."

During a game between the Tampa Bay Lightning and the Pittsburgh Penguins on April 6, 2024, Kozari briefly lost consciousness after an inadvertent head on head collision with Lightning defenceman Haydn Fleury. Both left the game due to injury, with Kozari leaving on a stretcher. He was admitted to UPMC Mercy in Pittsburgh, for precautionary reasons. He returned on April 21, working game one of the 2024 Stanley Cup playoff series between the Vancouver Canucks and the Nashville Predators.

== Personal life ==
Kozari lives in Las Vegas, Nevada, with his wife and two sons. His son Jackson is a referee in the AHL.

During the NHL off-seasons, he ran an officiating school in Penticton until its closure during the COVID-19 pandemic.

== See also ==
- List of NHL on-ice officials
