= François St-Laurent =

Canadian ice hockey referee (born 1977)

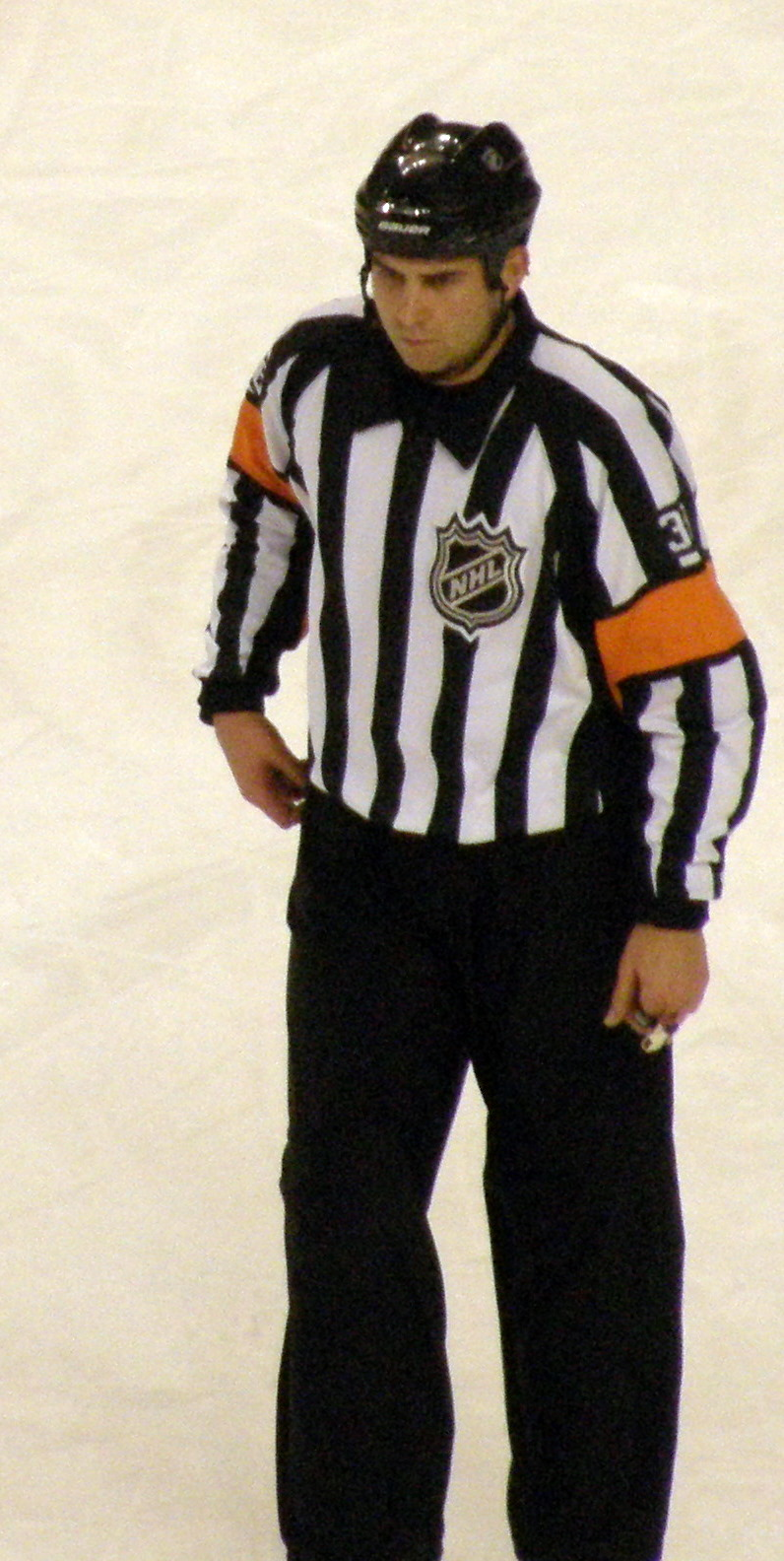
- St-Laurent in the 2009-10 season
- Born: June 26, 1977 (age 49); Greenfield Park, Quebec, Canada
- Occupation: Ice hockey referee
- Years active: 1999–present
- Employer: National Hockey League

François St-Laurent (born 26 June 1977) is a Canadian ice hockey referee, currently working in the National Hockey League. In the summer of 1999, during a camp held by Ron Fournier, he told Réseau des Sports that his goal was to make it to the NHL. Said to have "an exceptional talent", he became a Level VI referee in the Hockey Canada Officiating Program during a seminar in November 2001, held in Halifax, Nova Scotia.

After wearing sweater number 38 since joining the league full-time in the 2009–10 NHL season (carrying it over from the American Hockey League after six seasons (Note: Early in his AHL career, referees and linesmen did not wear numbers on their sweaters.)), St-Laurent changed to sweater number 8 in the 2019–20 NHL season. (Note: St-Laurent had called former NHL referee Dave Jackson prior to the season and asked if he could wear 8. Upon agreement, St-Laurent would start to wear 8; Peter MacDougall was promoted to full-time status prior to that season, and was assigned 38.)

== Officiating career ==
=== Pre-junior league ===
St-Laurent began his career as an official at the age of fifteen. In 1998 and 1999, he worked the Coupe Dodge championship. He also participated in the 2000 Air Canada Cup, held in Montreal, Quebec.

=== Juniors to professional career ===
==== Quebec Major Junior Hockey League ====
St-Laurent joined the Quebec Major Junior Hockey League in 1999, working thirty regular-season games and seven playoff games as a linesman. His first game in the league was on 10 September 1999, when he worked a game between the Val-d'Or Foreurs and Rouyn-Noranda Huskies. In the 2000-2001 season, he transitioned to a referee; the first regular-season game he worked as a referee came on 22 September 2000, as he worked the game between the Shawinigan Cataractes and Drummondville Voltigeurs. It would be the first of one hundred fifteen regular-season games he worked between the 00–01 and 02–03 seasons. St-Laurent would also work in twenty-four playoff games. He worked the President's Cup finals in both 2002 and 2003.

He worked the 2002 Memorial Cup, including the final game between the Victoriaville Tigres of the QMJHL and the Kootenay Ice of the Western Hockey League.

In March 2019, TVA personality (and former official) Stéphane Auger created a list of the league's top fifty officials throughout its then-fifty year history. For the list, only former QMJHL officials were considered; nobody on the current roster was named. Auger, listing his choices by region, named St-Laurent as one of the league's best officials. (Note: The list was not ranked by number.)

==== American Hockey League ====
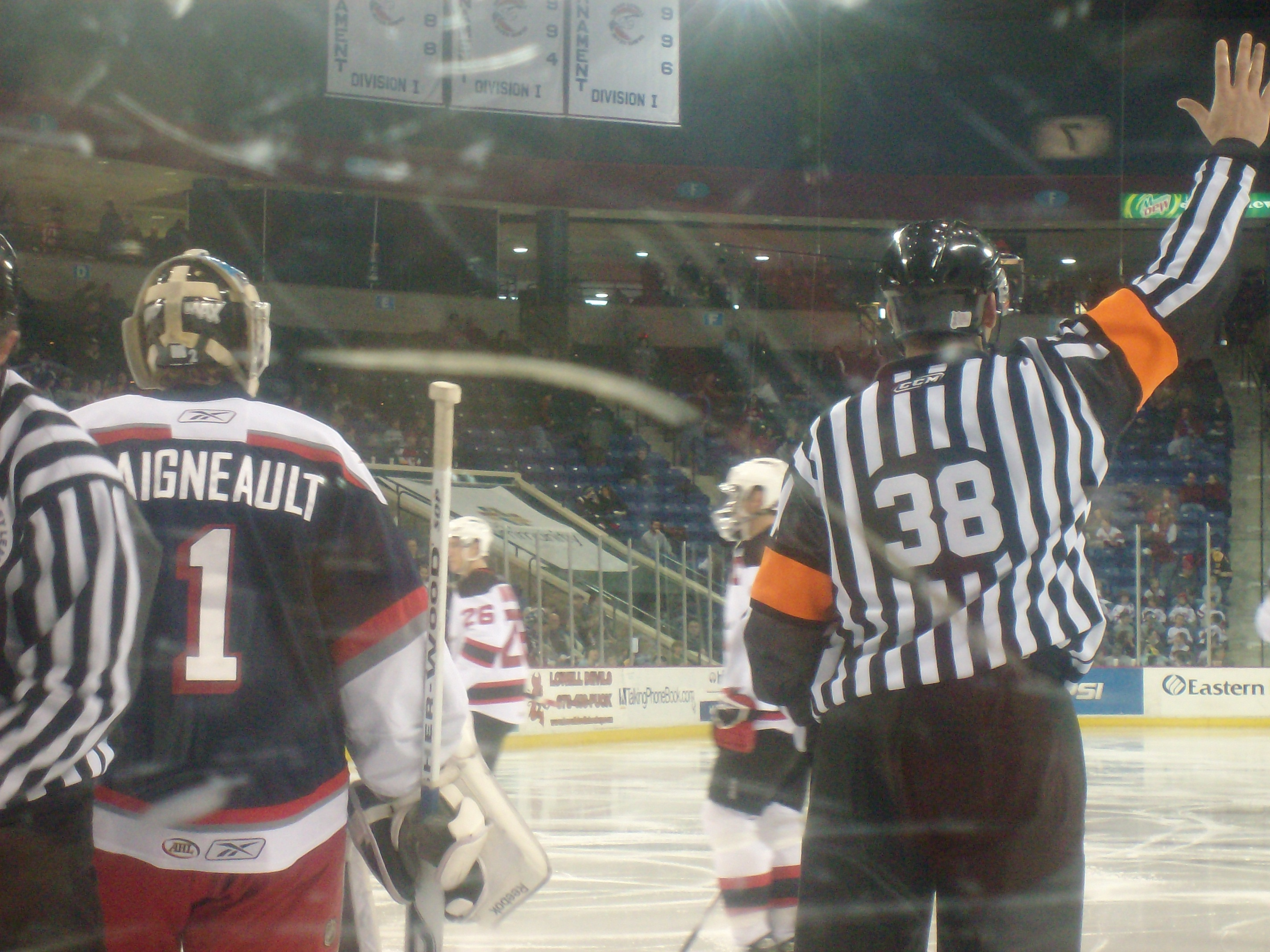
St-Laurent working an AHL game in 2009

As he began to work games in the QMJHL, St-Laurent was hired by the American Hockey League as a linesman for the 1999–00 AHL season. His first regular-season game in the AHL came on 22 November 1999, as the St. John's Maple Leafs faced off against the Quebec Citadelles. He spent four years working the lines in the AHL before he was hired by the NHL as a referee. (Note: St-Laurent may have been working AHL games as a referee as early as the 2002–03 AHL season.) While Quebec would be his home base, he would also work games in Ontario (Hamilton Bulldogs), New Brunswick (Saint John Flames), and Newfoundland (St. John's); all three of which came in the 2002–03 AHL season.

His first regular-season AHL game as a newly hired referee came on 11 October 2003, in a game between the Providence Bruins and Worcester IceCats. During his stint in the AHL, St-Laurent worked the Calder Cup finals in 2008 and 2009. He also worked the AHL All-Star Classic in 2009, held in Worcester, Massachusetts.

During the 2015–16 AHL season, St-Laurent worked two games as part of a rehabilitation assignment, marking his first appearance in the league since the summer of 2009. He had missed two and a half months for an undisclosed reason and returned to the NHL in February 2016.

==== National Hockey League ====
St-Laurent was hired by the National Hockey League in the fall of 2003, as one of six officials signed that year. The number he had been assigned was also in use by referee Craig Spada. (Note: Number 38 would not be the only number to be assigned to two officials that season: 40 was issued to both Steve Kozari and Jay Sharrers, while 45 was issued to both Justin St. Pierre and Ian Walsh.)

Although he was hired in 2003, St-Laurent did not work in the NHL that season. Due to the 2004–05 NHL lockout, (Note: He had worked a second full season in the AHL that year.) his first regular-season National Hockey League game came on 10 November 2005, in a game between the Ottawa Senators and Boston Bruins. He worked in ten other games that season, bouncing back and forth between the NHL and the American Hockey League. After working in sixty-six regular-season games over the course of four seasons, he would make the jump to the NHL officiating roster full-time at the start of the 2009–10 NHL season. His first game as a full-time official came on 2 October 2009, in a game between the New York Rangers and Pittsburgh Penguins.

In October 2011, then-Director of Officiating Terry Gregson was asked to briefly assess St-Laurent, among other officials in the NHL at the time. Gregson said that St-Laurent was one of the "very good young referees" at the time of the evaluation.

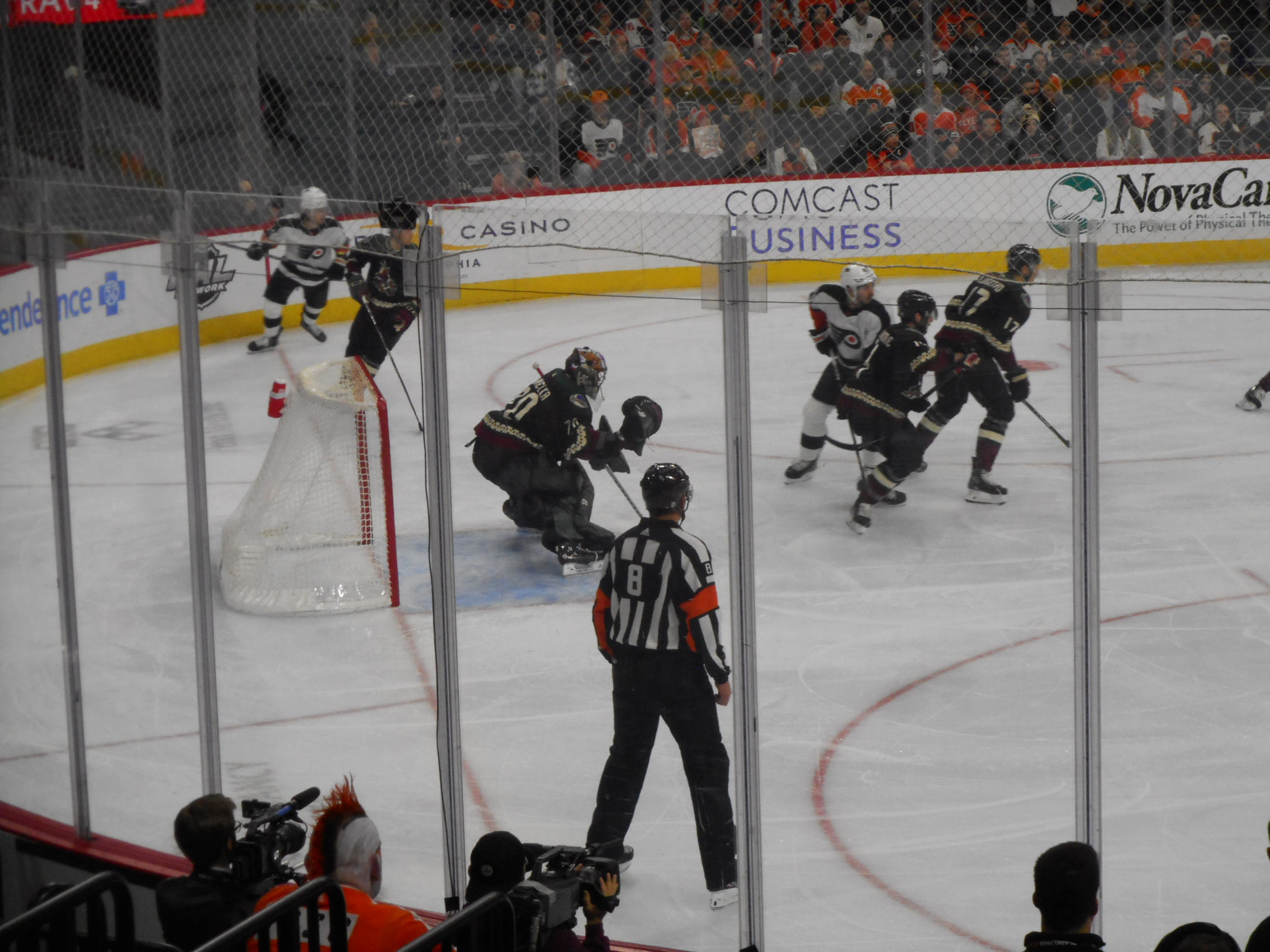
St-Laurent working a game in January 2023.

His 1000th career regular-season game took place on 7 February 2024, in a game between the Minnesota Wild and Chicago Blackhawks, while the ceremony to celebrate the milestone was before the 7 March 2024 game between the Montreal Canadiens and Carolina Hurricanes.

===== Stanley Cup playoffs =====
After working in the 2010 Stanley Cup playoffs as a standby, (Note: The reference listed would be one of seven games he would be a standby in during the playoffs in 2010.) St-Laurent was named to the main playoff roster each year from 2011 to 2022. He was assigned to first round games in twelve straight postseasons. (Note: 2011, 2012, 2013, 2014, 2015, 2016, 2017, 2018, 2019, 2020, 2021, 2022) He has made the second round six times in his career, picking up on-ice assignments for games between 2017 and 2022, (Note: 2017, 2018, 2019, 2020, 2021, 2022) and reached the third round in 2021. (Note: In 2021, the third round was called the "Stanley Cup Semifinals" rather than the Conference Finals.)

===== Notable games =====
St-Laurent worked the 2020 NHL All-Star Game, held at Enterprise Center in St. Louis, Missouri on 25 January. He also helped work the Skills competition the night before, along with referee Justin St. Pierre and linesmen Michel Cormier and Bryan Pancich. (Note: One of the referees replaced Tim Peel, who was injured in a regular-season game in December 2019 and was supposed to work his base city ASG.)

He has worked in two outdoor games during his NHL career: The 2015 NHL Winter Classic and the 2016 Heritage Classic. St-Laurent has also worked the 2018 NHL Global Series, including an exhibition game between Kölner Haie and the Edmonton Oilers.

===== Injuries =====
During the 2006–07 season, St-Laurent tore a ligament in his knee, which forced him to sit out a month's worth of AHL and NHL games. In a 2018 playoff game, he broke his collarbone after losing his balance and falling into the boards.

Between the 2017–18 and 2022–23 seasons, he left three games due to injury.

== Controversies ==
=== Capitals/Flyers line brawl ===
St-Laurent worked a game between the Washington Capitals and the Philadelphia Flyers on 1 November 2013. After a third period goal was scored by Washington's Joel Ward, a fight broke out between Capitals player Tom Wilson and Flyers player Wayne Simmonds. As the fight was taking place, Flyers goaltender Ray Emery skated down the ice to challenge Capitals goaltender Braden Holtby, which Holtby declined. When Emery said "just protect yourself", St-Laurent attempted to stop the fight, but couldn't when Emery began to punch Holtby. St-Laurent stopped various Capitals players from jumping in to stop Emery and did not stop the fight when Holtby fell to the ice. Emery was assessed penalties for leaving the crease (2 minutes), instigating (2 minutes), fighting (5 minutes), a ten-minute misconduct, and a game misconduct for his actions.

Through the week after the fight, the opinions about St-Laurent's actions were varied from different members of the media. Yahoo's Greg Wyshynski called St-Laurent a "joke" on the Monday afterwards, saying that he was "controlling the game". Calmer opinions came from Elliotte Friedman (then of CBC), who said that St-Laurent "tried to stop" the two combatants, yet "backed out" when the fight happened; and Darren Dreger of TSN, who said that he "couldn't rely on the linesmen" because of the multiple fights.

=== Lightning/Canadiens, 2014 Stanley Cup playoffs ===
On 22 April 2014, St-Laurent worked Game Four of the Eastern Conference Quarterfinal series between the Montreal Canadiens and the Tampa Bay Lightning. During the second intermission, CBC's Ron MacLean spoke up about St-Laurent's participation in the game, saying that he "would not have been a popular choice for the Tampa Bay Lightning". MacLean's comment stemmed from an incident in Game Three, where a goal for Tampa Bay was waved off by another French-Canadian referee. He had also said that due to Tampa Bay coach Jon Cooper's comments about the call, St-Laurent was thrown into Game Four "to send a message", when he had been assigned to the game before the playoffs began. MacLean apologized for his comments later that night, also saying that he wouldn't have minded if St-Laurent had worked in a later game of the series.

=== Relationship with Paul Maurice ===
==== Jets/Lightning, 2015–16 season ====
Late in the second period of a game between the Winnipeg Jets and Tampa Bay Lightning, played on 18 February 2016, Anton Stralman delivered a questionable hit to Bryan Little. St-Laurent and partner Dan O'Rourke did not issue penalties on the hit. (Blake Wheeler and Stralman would get penalties for roughing, while Stralman would not be suspended. Little ended up missing the rest of the regular season because of a T6 vertebrae fracture.) Upon hearing that there would be no further penalties towards Stralman, Jets coach Paul Maurice took exception to what he had heard from the referees. Based on his comments, the Jets would receive a bench minor.

Upon coming back to the bench for the start of the third period, Maurice would be sent back to the locker room, as he was ejected by St-Laurent. TSN, the network covering the game for the Jets, showed St-Laurent looking at the bench. Another shot showed what appeared to be him laughing about something; this gave the commentators the impression that the laughter stemmed from him ejecting Maurice. Said Maurice after the game: "I would say that would then have been consistent with their overall demeanor regarding the incident."

==== Aftermath of original encounter ====
A few days after the incident, Maurice was fined $5,000 for what he said about the referees. In September 2016, St-Laurent said that his laughter was unrelated to Maurice; Winnipeg's Dustin Byfuglien cracked a joke shortly after the ejection.

==== Panthers/Leafs, 2022–23 season ====
On 17 January 2023, St-Laurent was assigned to a game between the Florida Panthers and Toronto Maple Leafs. The game was very penalty-heavy, with Toronto receiving seven power plays to Florida's three. After the game, Maurice criticized the officiating in his media scrum with reporters. In particular, he mentioned his relationship with St-Laurent, saying "I just explained to them that it had nothing to do with my players. It had to do with me and a relationship that I have with one of the referees. That's what that was all about." Maurice was fined $25,000 for his comments a few days later.

== International tournaments ==
During the 2002–03 ice hockey season, St-Laurent was assigned to work the 2003 IIHF World Championship Division 1A tournament, held in Budapest, Hungary.

== Television appearances ==
Before the 2005–06 NHL season, TVA's LCN en Bref interviewed St-Laurent. During the interview, he said that he was on a five-year contract, as he gained experience between the American Hockey League and the National Hockey League. (Note: The five-year contract may have started while St-Laurent was working between the AHL and NHL in the 2005-06 hockey season.)

In a 2010 episode of HBO's 24/7 series involving the Pittsburgh Penguins and Washington Capitals, St-Laurent was seen talking to Bruce Boudreau about penalties that were issued early in the first period of a preview of the teams' Winter Classic. The next year, during the 24/7 series involving the New York Rangers and Philadelphia Flyers, a quick camera shot showed him giving Ryan Callahan a cross-checking penalty.

A segment during an October 2015 episode of NESN's Behind the B followed St-Laurent through the course of the Boston Bruins' home opener against the Winnipeg Jets.

== Off-ice contributions ==
In the winter of 2007, St-Laurent took part in the first "Zebras Care" program that the National Hockey League Officials Association put together.

As part of the 40th anniversary of the NHLOA, a logo was created by St-Laurent to help commemorate the milestone.

Between 2013 and 2015, St-Laurent ran a summer development camp for referees. Camps were held in Saint-Constant, Quebec in 2014 and Brossard, Quebec in both 2013 and 2015. In the 2015 camp, the participants worked games in L’Expérience HockeySuprématie.com, a tournament with proceeds going towards various charities.

During the summer of 2014, he was a speaker in Hockey Quebec's Provincial Elite Officials Program.

For the 2019-20 hockey season, St-Laurent (along with the other French-Canadian officials in the NHL) was featured in a video produced by Hockey Quebec, under a theme of "no ref, no match".

== Personal life ==
St-Laurent was a goaltender in his youth, spending the late stages of his playing career on the bench as the backup. He has been based in the Raleigh, North Carolina area since 2010, upon his promotion to the full-time officiating roster.

== See also ==
- List of NHL on-ice officials
