= Matt Pavelich =

Canadian ice hockey official (1934–2026)

- Born: Matthew Ivan Pavelich; March 12, 1934; Parkhill, Ontario, Canada
- Died: October 30, 2026 (aged 92)
- Occupations: NHL linesman, UHL off-ice official
- Relatives: Marty Pavelich (brother)
- Honors: Hockey Hall of Fame (1987)

Matthew Ivan Pavelich (March 12, 1934 – October 30, 2026) was a Canadian National Hockey League ice hockey linesman, the first to ever be elected to the Hockey Hall of Fame in 1987. After his NHL linesman career, Pavelich served as Supervisor of Officials and Director of Player Discipline for the United Hockey League.

== Early career ==
Pavelich began officiating when he was fourteen, working minor hockey games in Sault Ste. Marie, Ontario, and by the time he was twenty years old, was referee-in-chief of the Northern Michigan Intermediate League.

He worked in the American Hockey League in the 1955–56 season, and he made his National Hockey League début on October 11, 1956, at 22.

His older brother Marty Pavelich had been a player with the Detroit Red Wings since 1947, and when the younger Pavelich joined the NHL in 1956, it marked the first time in NHL history where there had been a player/official brother combination.

== Career in the NHL ==
Pavelich retired after 23 years and 1,727 regular-season games, second only to Neil Armstrong. He also officiated 245 playoff games, second only to John D'Amico. He also worked seven Stanley Cup Finals.

After that, Pavelich became the NHL's supervisor of officials for referee-in-chief Scotty Morrison.

In 1987, Pavelich was inducted into the Hockey Hall of Fame.

On January 24, 1979, Pavelich refereed the first period of the game between the New York Rangers and the Washington Capitals. This was because the scheduled referee for the game Bruce Hood, was unable to make it to the Capital Centre in time, arriving late and taking over the referee chores at the start of the second period.

In his ninth season with the United Hockey League, he served as a Supervisor of Officials as well as the Director of Player Discipline for the first half of the 1998–99 season.

== Death ==
Pavelich died on October 30, 2026, at the age of 92.

== See also ==
- List of Detroit Red Wings players
- List of members of the Hockey Hall of Fame
- List of NHL on-ice officials
