= Jordan Samuels-Thomas =

American ice hockey referee and player (born 1990)

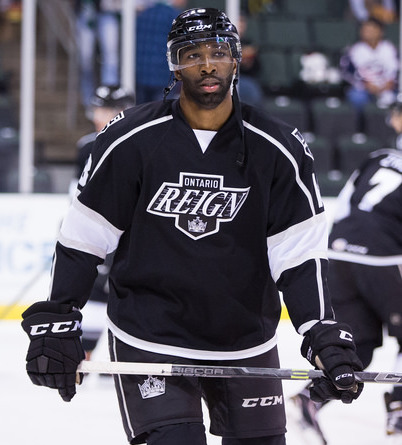
- Samuels-Thomas with the Ontario Reign in 2020
- Born: May 28, 1990 (age 36); West Hartford, Connecticut, US
- Education: Quinnipiac University
- Occupation: Ice hockey referee
- Years active: 2022–present
- Employer: National Hockey League
Ice hockey career
- Height: 6 ft 4 in (193 cm)
- Weight: 190 lb (86 kg; 13 st 8 lb)
- Position: Left wing
- Shot: Left
- Played for: San Diego Gulls; Ontario Reign; KHL Medveščak Zagreb
- NHL draft: 203rd overall, 2009; Atlanta Thrashers
- Playing career: 2014–2020

Jordan Blaine Samuels-Thomas (born May 28, 1990) is an American National Hockey League referee and former professional ice hockey player. He was selected by the Atlanta Thrashers in the seventh round (203rd overall) of the 2009 NHL entry draft. He made his officiating debut during the 2021–22 NHL season and has refereed 55 regular season games as of the start of the 2024–25 season. He wears uniform number 37.

== Early life ==
Samuels-Thomas was born in West Hartford, Connecticut. He played junior hockey with the Waterloo Black Hawks of the United States Hockey League (USHL) before attending Bowling Green State University to play the 2009–10 and 2010–11 seasons with the Bowling Green Falcons. He then transferred to Quinnipiac University, where he played the 2012–13 and 2013–14 seasons with the Quinnipiac Bobcats men's ice hockey team. During his four years of college hockey Samuels-Thomas played 148 games, registering 50 goals, 54 assists, and 162 penalty minutes. He earned a bachelor's and master's degree in journalism from Quinnipiac University.

== Professional playing career ==
On July 9, 2014, the Winnipeg Jets traded his NHL rights to the Buffalo Sabres in exchange for a conditional seventh-round pick in the 2015 NHL entry draft, and three days later, on July 12, 2014, the Buffalo Sabres signed him to a one-year, entry-level contract. The Sabres chose not to retain his rights after that season.

On September 24, 2015, Samuels-Thomas was signed by the Ontario Reign. He was briefly assigned to the Manchester Monarchs of the ECHL at the beginning of the season, but then was recalled back to the Reign.

On December 30, 2017, while in the midst of his second season with the Gulls, Samuels-Thomas was released from his AHL contract after appearing in 18 games for two points. On January 3, 2018, he signed his first contract abroad with Mladá Boleslav of the Czech Extraliga (ELH) until the end of the 2017–18 season. After just four games with them Samuels-Thomas switched teams again and signed with Augsburger Panther of the Deutsche Eishockey Liga on January 25, 2018.

As a free agent from the Panthers in the off-season, Samuels-Thomas moved to the neighboring Austrian Hockey League, agreeing to a one-year deal with Croatian-based KHL Medveščak Zagreb on August 1, 2018. In the 2018–19 season, Samuels-Thomas contributed with 11 points through 17 games before opting to leave the club mid-season. On January 18, 2019, having returned to North America, he signed an AHL contract with the Hershey Bears for the remainder of the season and was immediately assigned to ECHL affiliate, the South Carolina Stingrays.

On September 29, 2019, approaching the 2019–20 season, Samuels-Thomas agreed to continue his career in the ECHL, signing with the Worcester Railers. He registered 11 goals and 29 points in 33 games with the Railers, before leaving the club to return to Europe for the remainder of the season, agreeing to a contract with German DEL2 club, Heilbronner Falken on February 3, 2020.

== Officiating career ==
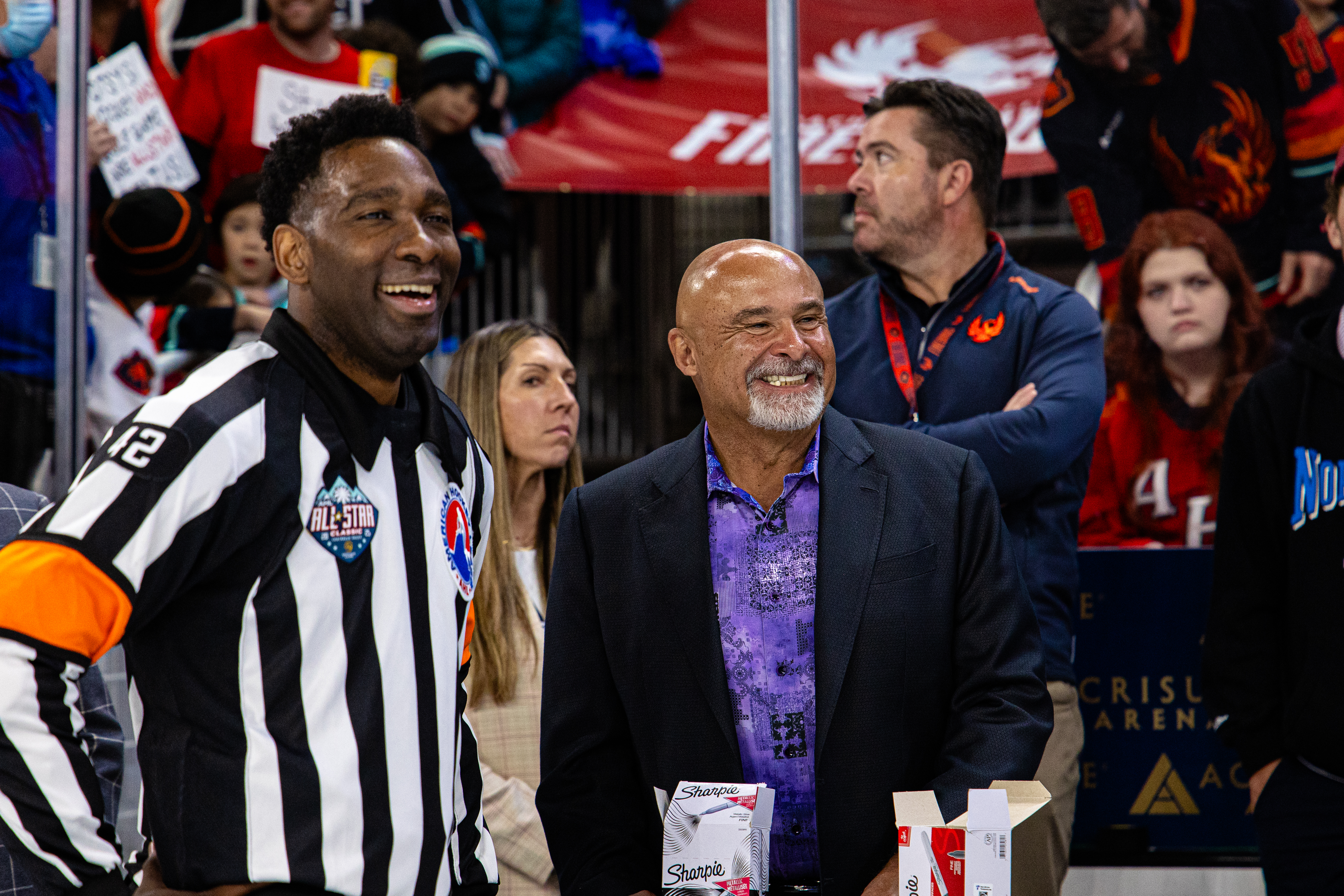
Samuels-Thomas with Grant Fuhr at the 2025 AHL All Star Game.

On January 29, 2021, Samuels-Thomas ended his playing career after six professional seasons and began a career as an official. He was hired on a minor-league contract by the NHL for the 2021–22 season, working a few preseason games with veteran officials. His first game in the NHL was on April 14, 2022, between the San Jose Sharks and Chicago Blackhawks. Upon officiating the game, Samuels-Thomas became the third known Black official to work in the NHL after linesmen Jay Sharrers and Shandor Alphonso, and the first to be initially hired as a referee. (Note: Sharrers was a referee for the 2000–01 season but switched back to being a linesman shortly after.) He also became the first African-American official, as Sharrers and Alphonso are Canadian. The game’s other officials were referee Eric Furlatt, and linesmen Alphonso and Ryan Galloway.

== Career statistics ==
| | | | Regular season | | | | | Playoffs |
| Season | Team | League | GP | G | A | Pts | PIM | GP | G | A | Pts | PIM |
|---|---|---|---|---|---|---|---|---|---|---|---|---|
| 2006–07 | Hartford Jr. Wolfpack | AtJHL | 43 | 21 | 38 | 59 | 44 | 1 | 1 | 0 | 1 | 0 |
| 2007–08 | Waterloo Black Hawks | USHL | 56 | 8 | 3 | 11 | 65 | 11 | 0 | 2 | 2 | 10 |
| 2008–09 | Waterloo Black Hawks | USHL | 59 | 32 | 22 | 54 | 59 | 3 | 2 | 1 | 3 | 2 |
| 2009–10 | Bowling Green State U. | CCHA | 35 | 11 | 14 | 25 | 30 | — | — | — | — | — |
| 2010–11 | Bowling Green State U. | CCHA | 36 | 9 | 12 | 21 | 46 | — | — | — | — | — |
| 2012–13 | Quinnipiac University | ECAC | 43 | 17 | 12 | 29 | 40 | — | — | — | — | — |
| 2013–14 | Quinnipiac University | ECAC | 34 | 13 | 16 | 29 | 46 | — | — | — | — | — |
| 2014–15 | Rochester Americans | AHL | 63 | 5 | 3 | 8 | 70 | — | — | — | — | — |
| 2015–16 | Manchester Monarchs | ECHL | 1 | 0 | 0 | 0 | 0 | — | — | — | — | — |
| 2015–16 | Ontario Reign | AHL | 58 | 12 | 10 | 22 | 46 | 13 | 1 | 0 | 1 | 8 |
| 2016–17 | Utah Grizzlies | ECHL | 4 | 3 | 3 | 6 | 2 | — | — | — | — | — |
| 2016–17 | Florida Everblades | ECHL | 5 | 0 | 2 | 2 | 0 | — | — | — | — | — |
| 2016–17 | San Diego Gulls | AHL | 56 | 12 | 12 | 24 | 17 | 10 | 1 | 0 | 1 | 2 |
| 2017–18 | San Diego Gulls | AHL | 18 | 1 | 1 | 2 | 18 | — | — | — | — | — |
| 2017–18 | BK Mladá Boleslav | ELH | 4 | 0 | 1 | 1 | 10 | — | — | — | — | — |
| 2017–18 | Augsburger Panther | DEL | 6 | 3 | 1 | 4 | 2 | — | — | — | — | — |
| 2018–19 | KHL Medveščak Zagreb | EBEL | 17 | 2 | 9 | 11 | 10 | — | — | — | — | — |
| 2018–19 | South Carolina Stingrays | ECHL | 26 | 6 | 12 | 18 | 13 | 4 | 1 | 2 | 3 | 2 |
| 2019–20 | Worcester Railers | ECHL | 33 | 11 | 18 | 29 | 18 | — | — | — | — | — |
| 2019–20 | Heilbronner Falken | DEL2 | 5 | 1 | 3 | 4 | 0 | — | — | — | — | — |
| AHL totals | | | 195 | 28 | 28 | 56 | 151 | 23 | 2 | 0 | 2 | 10 |

== Awards and honors ==
| Award | Year |
|---|---|
College
| NCAA All-Tournament Team | 2013 |

== See also ==
- List of NHL on-ice officials
