= Stéphane Provost =

French Canadian ice hockey official

- Born: May 5, 1967; Montreal, Quebec, Canada
- Died: April 22, 2005 (aged 37); Weston, Florida, U.S.

Stéphane Provost (May 5, 1967 – April 22, 2005) was a French Canadian National Hockey League (NHL) linesman.

== Career ==
Provost played as a defenceman prior to his officiating career, playing two seasons in the Quebec Major Junior Hockey League (QMJHL) for the Verdun Junior Canadiens and the Saint-Jean Castors between 1985 and 1987. He then worked as an official in the QMJHL from 1989 to 1994. Provost was hired by the NHL in September 1994 and officiated his first regular season game on January 25, 1995, between the Florida Panthers and Tampa Bay Lightning; his career included 695 regular season games.

== Death ==
Provost was killed at 37 years of age in a road accident at approximately 3:30 a.m. Eastern Time while travelling on his motorcycle west on State Road 84 after hitting a tractor trailer. The motorcycle burst into flames, falling onto Provost, who was not wearing a motorcycle helmet. Police reports indicate Provost was leaving a bar at the Hard Rock Hotel in Hollywood, Florida. The driver of the tractor trailer was uninjured. Provost was survived by his wife, Sandra, and two daughters, Ashley and Reily.

=== Tributes ===
Following his death, officials in the QMJHL wore his officials uniform number 72 on their helmet for the remainder of the 2004–05 QMJHL season. Provost died during the 2004–05 NHL lockout and was followed in death only five weeks later by Hall of Fame official John D'Amico; both were honoured by their colleagues when games in the NHL resumed, including wearing a patch on their uniforms with his number. Provost's uniform number of 72 is now retired in his memory and no longer issued to NHL linesmen. Provost was also close friends with Major League Baseball umpire Alfonso Márquez, who also wears #72 and hung out with Provost on the night of his death.
