= T. J. Luxmore =

Canadian ice hockey referee

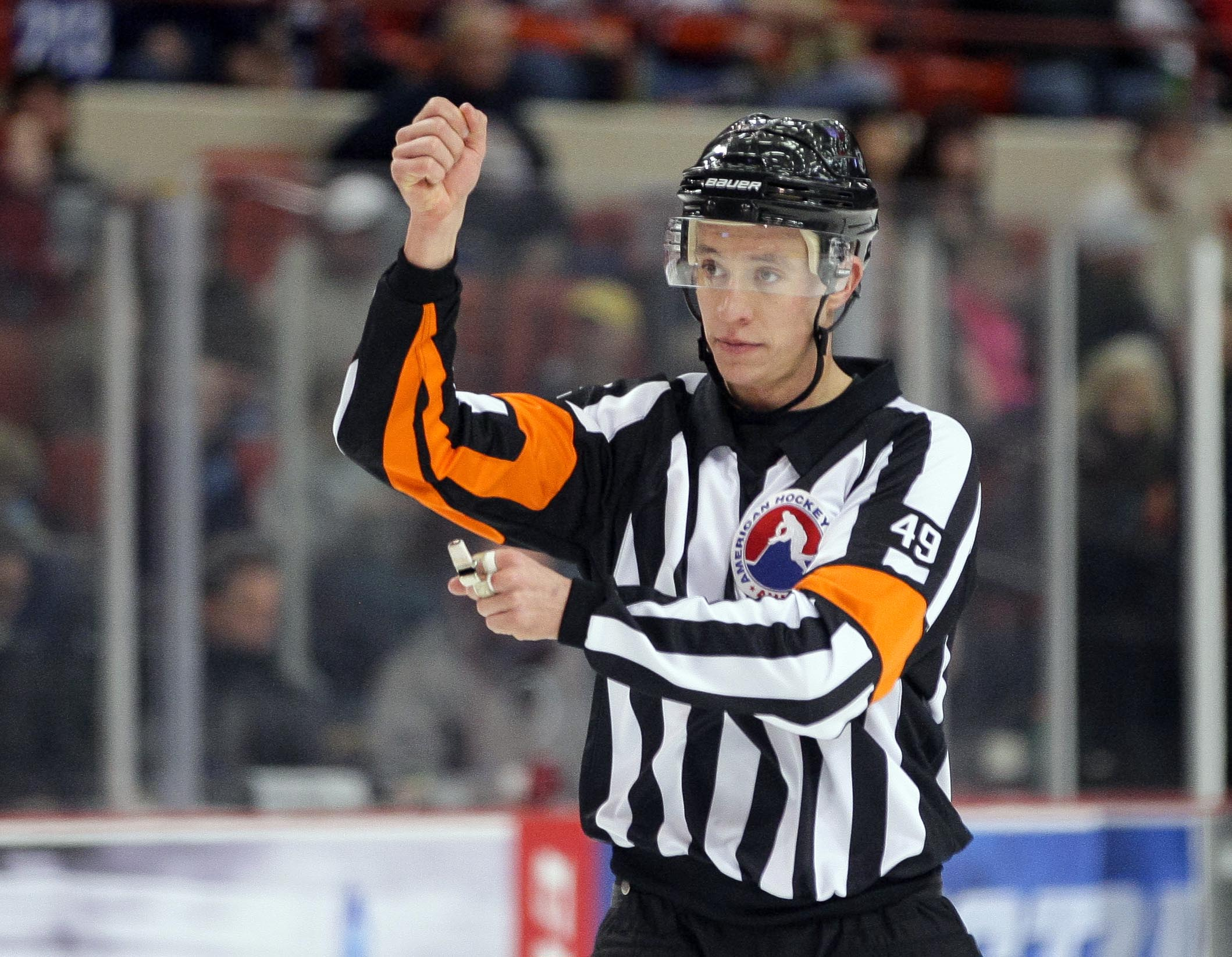
- Luxmore as an AHL referee in 2013
- Born: Thomas John Luxmore; Timmins, Ontario, Canada
- Education: University of Waterloo
- Occupation: Ice hockey referee
- Years active: 2013–present
- Employer: National Hockey League

Thomas John Luxmore is a Canadian ice hockey referee currently officiating in the National Hockey League. He made his debut during the 2013–14 NHL season, and wears uniform number 21. As of the start of the 2024–25 season, he has refereed 655 regular season games and 29 Stanley Cup playoff games.

== Early life and career ==
Thomas John Luxmore was born and raised in Timmins, Ontario. He began officiating minor hockey in his hometown at the age of 16, and then moved out at 18 to attend the University of Waterloo. While living in Waterloo, he was hired as a linesman in the Ontario Hockey League while also working with his university’s campus recreation department as referee-in-chief. He worked one OHL season as a linesman before switching to referee. He was in the OHL for four seasons, during which he officiated the 2009 World U-17 Hockey Challenge in Port Alberni, British Columbia. Luxmore started to work minor league games during his final season in major junior.

== Professional career ==
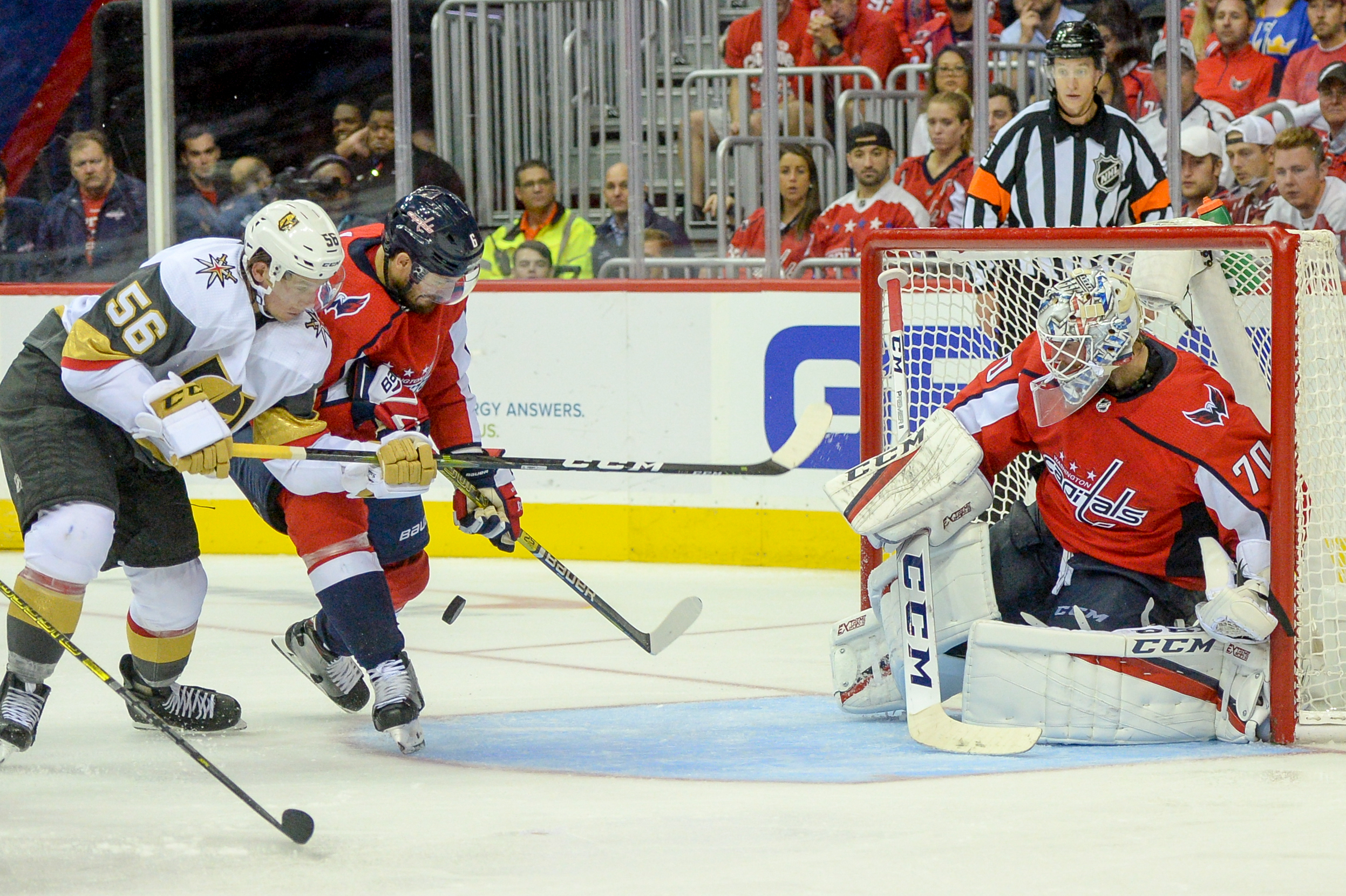
Luxmore watches a play during a 2018 game between the Vegas Golden Knights and the Washington Capitals

Luxmore began his professional hockey career working games in the International Hockey League, the Central Hockey League, and the ECHL, earning an assignment to the IHL’s 2009 Turner Cup Finals. He was hired as a full-time referee for the 2010–11 ECHL season and continued in the ECHL for both the 2011–12 and 2012–13 seasons. During that time, he officiated in the 2011 and 2012 Kelly Cup Finals, and started working games in the American Hockey League.

Luxmore was hired on an NHL minor league contract in September 2012, and worked in the AHL for the 2012–13 season. He made his NHL debut on November 19, 2013, officiating a match-up at Joe Louis Arena between the Nashville Predators and Detroit Red Wings. He refereed alongside Dennis LaRue, and linesmen Andy McElman and Bryan Pancich. During the 2014–15 season, Luxmore officiated 21 NHL games, the most of any part-time referee that season, and was promoted to the full-time roster in July 2015. He also worked the 2015 Calder Cup Finals.

== Personal life ==
Luxmore graduated from the University of Waterloo with a science degree.

He moved to Ontario, California upon being hired by the ECHL in 2010 and relocated to Reading, Pennsylvania the following season.

== See also ==
- List of NHL on-ice officials
