= Chris Schlenker =

Canadian ice hockey referee (born 1984)

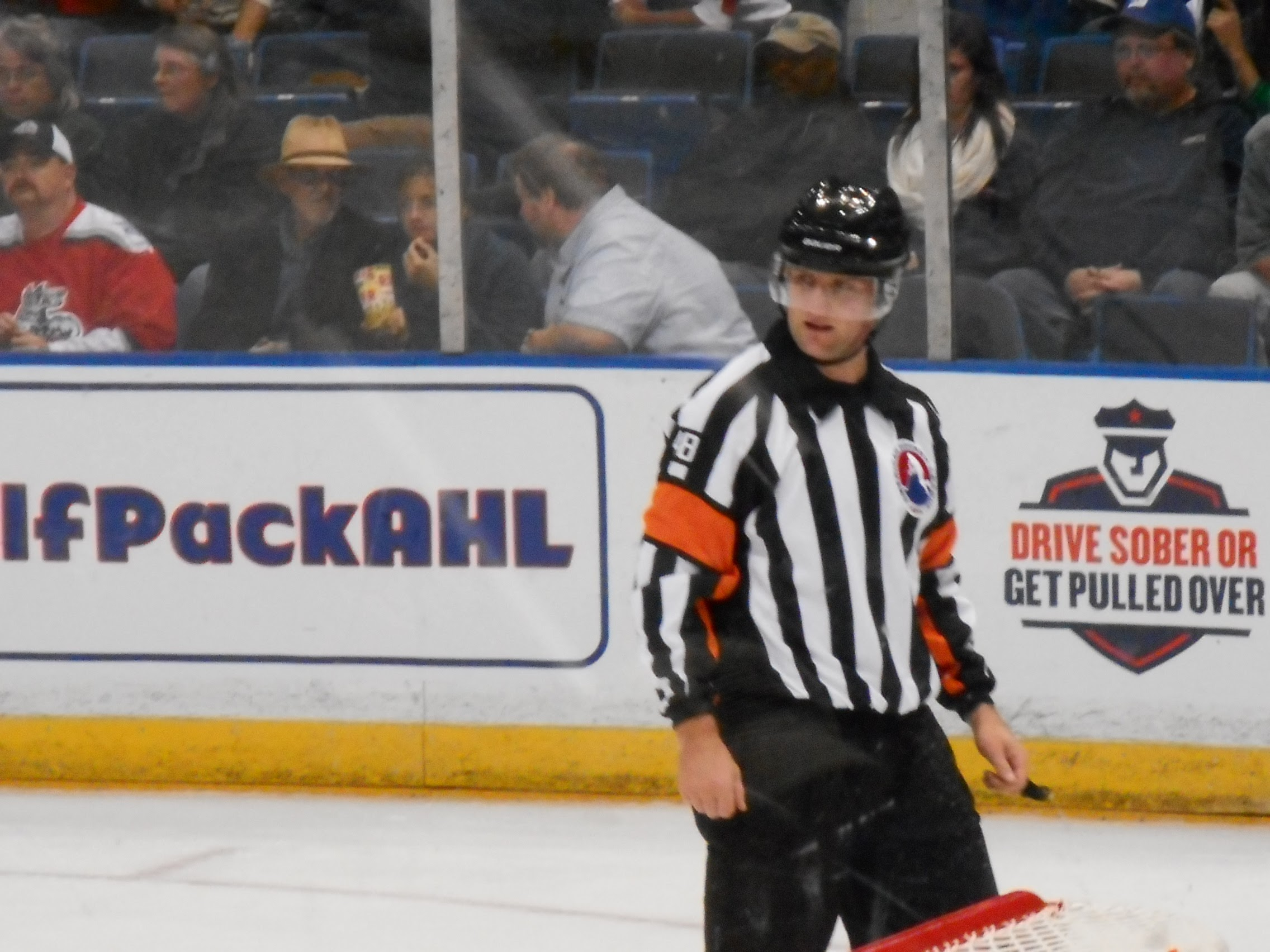
- Schlenker as an AHL referee in 2016
- Born: July 9, 1984 (age 42); Medicine Hat, Alberta, Canada
- Occupation: Ice hockey referee
- Years active: 2016–present
- Employer: National Hockey League
Ice hockey career
- Height: 6 ft 2 in (188 cm)
- Weight: 194 lb (88 kg; 13 st 12 lb)
- Position: Defence
- Shot: Left
- Played for: Stuttgart Wizards
- Playing career: 2005–2006

Chris Schlenker (born 9 July 1984) is a Canadian ice hockey referee, currently working in the National Hockey League. He has worn sweater number three since being promoted to the NHL before the start of the 2018-19 season; prior to the promotion, he wore 48. (Note: Schlenker wore sweater number 48 while he was under a minor-league contract with the NHL. In the 2015-16 AHL season, he wore 23.) As of the start of the 2024–25 season, he has officiated 425 regular season games.

== Playing career ==
Schlenker made his junior playing debut with the St. Albert Saints of the Alberta Junior Hockey League in 2000, playing in three games before making the jump up to the Western Hockey League during the 2000-01 season. He joined the Regina Pats, and played his first game on 1 December 2000, when Regina played against the Brandon Wheat Kings. It would be the only game he would play that season, as he was sent to the Alberta Midget Hockey League to play for the MLAC Maple Leafs.

He was part of the Pats roster until 2003-04, when he was sent to the Prince Albert Raiders in a January trade. At the time of the trade, he was the captain of Regina. Schlenker would remain with the Raiders until the end of the 2004-05 season.

In 2005, he signed with the Stuttgart Wizards of the German Oberliga, playing 11 games in his lone season in the league. He played senior hockey in Saskatchewan the following season.

=== International tournaments ===
In 2002, Schlenker was named to Canada's inaugural roster for the IIHF World U18 Championships.

== Officiating career ==
=== Western Hockey League ===
In 2012, Schlenker rejoined the WHL, coming onboard as a referee.

He was named as one of the five referees who would work in the 2016 Memorial Cup, held in Red Deer, Alberta. He also received the Allen Paradice Memorial Trophy in 2016 as the WHL's top official that season.

=== American Hockey League ===
Schlenker was hired by the American Hockey League before the start of the 2015-16 season. His first regular-season game came on 17 October 2015, in a game between the Albany Devils and Toronto Marlies in Toronto, Ontario.

His first regular-season game in the AHL while being on a minor-league deal was on 14 October 2016, as the St. John's IceCaps faced off against the Hartford Wolf Pack in Hartford, Connecticut.

During his tenure in the AHL, Schlenker worked the Calder Cup finals in 2017 and 2018.

=== National Hockey League ===
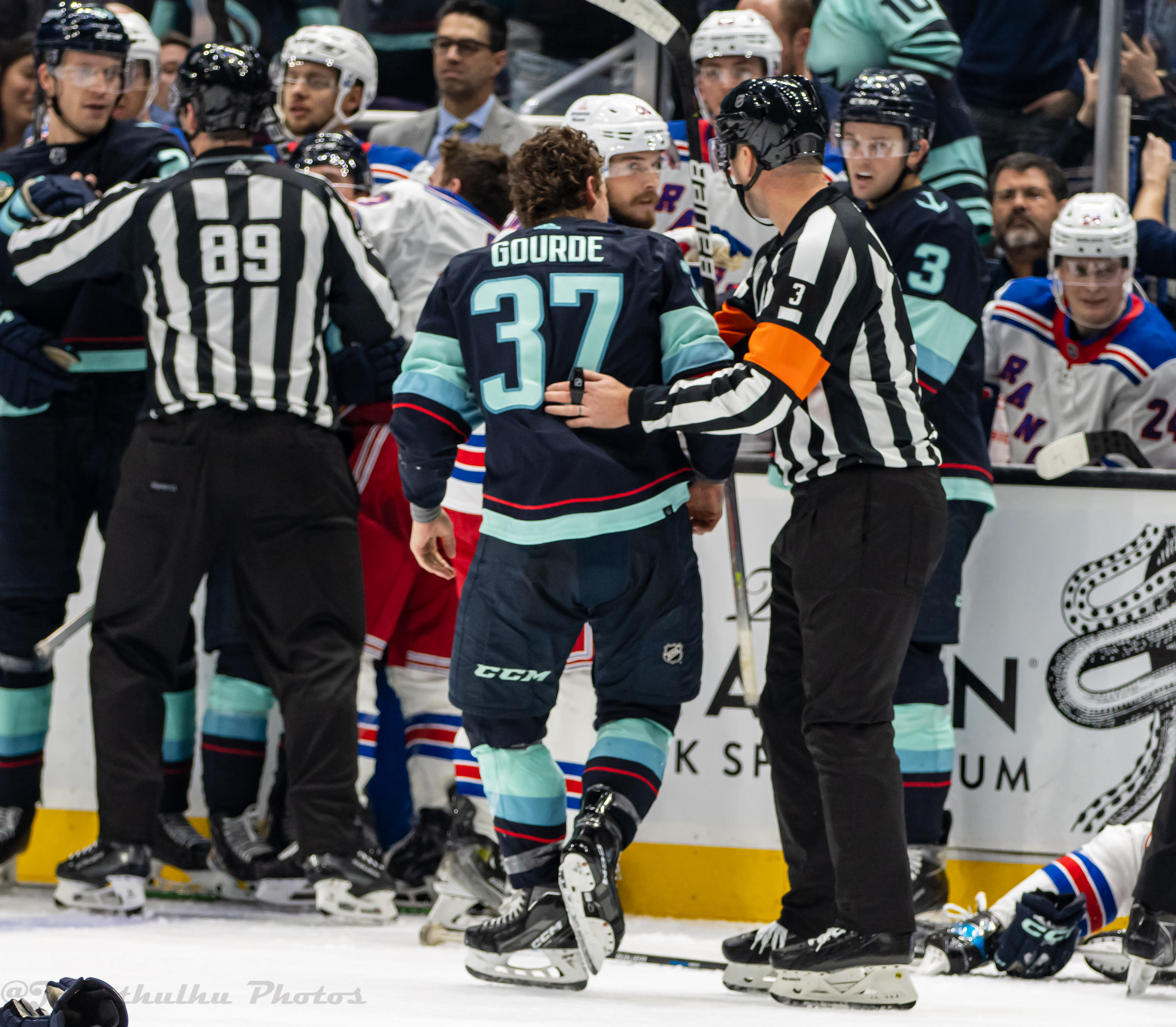
Schlenker speaks with Seattle Kraken forward Yanni Gourde during an October 2023 game against the New York Rangers

Prior to the 2016-17 season, Schlenker was hired by the NHL on a minor-league contract. He worked his first regular-season game on 24 October 2016, in a game between the Philadelphia Flyers and Montreal Canadiens. (Note: The game notes show three referees: Schlenker, Dave Jackson, and Brad Meier. Schlenker would work this game with Meier.)

Schlenker was promoted to the full-time officiating roster before the start of the 2018-19 NHL season, after working 59 games in parts of two seasons. His first game as a full-time NHL official came on 3 October 2019, when the Anaheim Ducks faced off against the San Jose Sharks.

== Personal life ==
Upon retiring from his playing career, Schlenker joined the Medicine Hat Police Service. He stayed onboard for ten years, leaving when he joined the NHL.

His son, Marek, is a goaltender currently playing with the Regina Pats. He was selected by the Portland Winterhawks in the eighth round of the 2021 WHL Bantam Draft.

== Career statistics ==
=== Regular season and playoffs ===
			Regular season					Playoffs
Season	Team	League	GP	G	A	Pts	PIM	GP	G	A	Pts	PIM
2000–01	St. Albert Saints	AJHL	3	0	1	1	2	—	—	—	—	—
2000–01	Regina Pats	WHL	1	0	0	0	0	—	—	—	—	—
2001–02	Regina Pats	WHL	72	6	19	25	197	6	0	2	2	10
2002–03	Regina Pats	WHL	70	5	17	22	188	2	0	0	0	11
2003–04	Regina Pats	WHL	44	5	9	14	114	—	—	—	—	—
2003–04	Prince Albert Raiders	WHL	27	2	6	8	64	6	0	1	1	2
2004–05	Prince Albert Raiders	WHL	70	7	16	23	155	17	1	9	10	45
2005–06	Stuttgart Wizards	Oberliga	11	5	3	8	90	—	—	—	—	—
2006–07	Eston Ramblers	SaskWHL	19	17	27	44	84	6	3	8	11	21
WHL totals			284	25	67	92	718	31	1	12	13	68

== See also ==
- List of NHL on-ice officials
