= Allen Paradice Memorial Trophy =

Canadian hockey award

The Allen Paradice Memorial Trophy is awarded annually by the Western Hockey League to its top on-ice official as voted by the league's coaches and general managers.

Allen Paradice was a referee for many years in the WHL, as well as the league's Director of Officiating in the 1980s. This award was created in 1994 and named in his honour. Many of the officials who have won this award have moved on to officiate in the National Hockey League

== Winners ==
Season	Referee
1994–95	Tom Kowal
1995–96	Lonnie Cameron
1996–97	Tom Kowal
1997–98	Brad Meier
1998–99	Kelly Sutherland
1999–2000	Mike Hasenfratz
2000–01	Kevin Acheson
2001–02	Kevin Acheson
2002–03	Steve Kozari
2003–04	Rob Matsuoka
2004–05	Rob Matsuoka
2005–06	Kyle Rehman
2006–07	Andy Theissen
2007–08	Andy Theissen
2008–09	Chris Savage
2009–10	Chris Savage
2010–11	Matt Kirk
2011–12	Pat Smith
2012–13	Nathan Wieler
2013–14	Nathan Wieler
2014–15	Reagan Vetter
2015–16	Chris Schlenker
2016–17	Brett Iverson
2017–18	Brett Iverson
2018–19	Brett Iverson
2019–20	Jeff Ingram
2020–21	not awarded
2021–22	Chris Crich
2022–23	Chris Crich
2023–24	Jeff Ingram
2024–25	Mike Langin
2025–26	Mike Campbell
