= John Ashley (ice hockey) =

Canadian ice hockey referee (1930–2008)

- Born: March 5, 1930; Galt, Ontario, Canada
- Died: January 5, 2008 (aged 77); Kitchener, Ontario, Canada
- Occupation: Ice hockey referee
- Years active: 1959–1972
- Employer: National Hockey League
Ice hockey career
- Hockey Hall of Fame, 1981 (Official)
- Position: Defense
- Played for: Pittsburgh Hornets; Syracuse Warriors
- Playing career: 1950–1953

John George Ashley (March 5, 1930 – January 5, 2008) was a Canadian referee in the National Hockey League.

== Early life ==
Ashley was born in Galt, Ontario, and raised in Preston. He played junior hockey with the Toronto Marlboros and Guelph Biltmores. In 1950, he tried out for the Toronto Maple Leafs and played on farm teams in Pittsburgh and Syracuse, New York.

== Career ==
Ashley started his officiating career in 1959. From 1964 to 1972, John officiated every Game Seven in the Stanley Cup playoffs.

During the 1971 Stanley Cup playoffs, Ashley achieved a first for NHL referees by officiating the seventh game of all three series that had seven games: a quarterfinal (Montreal vs. Boston), a semifinal (New York vs. Chicago), and the final (Montreal vs. Chicago).

John was elected to the Hockey Hall of Fame in 1981. Ashley was elected to the Cambridge Sports Hall of Fame in 1998.

== Personal life ==
Ashley died in Kitchener, Ontario, on January 5, 2008.

== Career statistics ==
			Regular season					Playoffs
Season	Team	League	GP	G	A	Pts	PIM	GP	G	A	Pts	PIM
1947–48	Galt Rockets	OHA	11	0	2	2	8	—	—	—	—	—
1950–51	Pittsburgh Hornets	AHL	59	1	4	5	89	—	—	—	—	—
1951–52	Pittsburgh Hornets	AHL	24	1	2	3	36	—	—	—	—	—
1952–53	Ottawa Senators	QSHL	4	0	0	0	12	—	—	—	—	—
1952–53	Pittsburgh Hornets	AHL	41	1	9	10	37	—	—	—	—	—
1952–53	Syracuse Warriors	AHL	41	1	9	10	37	4	0	0	0	0
1954–55	Stratford Indians	OHASr	50	3	9	12	0	—	—	—	—	—
1955–56	Stratford Indians	OHASr	48	1	18	19	0	—	—	—	—	—
AHL totals			124	3	15	18	162	4	0	0	0	0

== See also ==
- List of members of the Hockey Hall of Fame
- List of NHL on-ice officials
