= Art Skov =

- Born: September 2, 1928; Windsor, Ontario, Canada
- Died: April 19, 2009 (aged 80); Windsor, Ontario, Canada
- Played for: Detroit Hettche
- Playing career: 1948–1952

Art Skov (September 2, 1928 – April 19, 2009) was a referee and Supervisor of Officials in the National Hockey League, officiating more than 1,000 NHL games. He was also a Supervisor of Officials in the World Hockey Association.

== Career ==
After a junior season with the Windsor Spitfires in 1946, Skov played four seasons as a forward in the International Hockey League, most notably for the Detroit Hettche club, with whom he ended his playing career in 1952. He then went into officiating, and after an apprenticeship in the minor leagues, joined the NHL as a linesman in 1956.

Becoming a referee full-time in 1960, Skov was named as the referee in the league's All-Star Game in 1964, 1970 and 1974, as well as in several Stanley Cup Finals and in the second Canada Cup series, as the first active NHL referee to officiate in international competition.

He went on to officiate 1,026 games before his retirement in 1975, as the league's senior referee. At the time of his retirement, he had refereed more games than any other referee in the history of the NHL. He became the Supervisor of Officials for the World Hockey Association in 1977-78.

Skov's younger brother Glen was a player in the NHL, most notably with the Detroit Red Wings, and the Skovs were the second player/official brother combination in league history, following Matt and Marty Pavelich, earlier in the 1956 season.

After his retirement as a referee, Skov became one of the league's Supervisors of Officials, before retiring from sports to run a trophy store in his native Windsor. He is interred at Greenlawn Memorial Gardens in Windsor.
