= Jon McIsaac =

Canadian ice hockey referee

- Born: November 25, 1983 (age 42); Truro, Nova Scotia, Canada
- Occupation: Ice hockey referee
- Years active: 2013–present
- Employer: National Hockey League

Jon McIsaac (born November 25, 1983) is a Canadian referee in the National Hockey League. He officiated his first game during the 2013–14 NHL season and wears uniform number 2. As of the start of the 2024–25 season, he has refereed 564 regular season games and 37 Stanley Cup playoff games.

A resident of Truro, Nova Scotia, McIsaac officiated at the 2003 Canada Winter Games held in Bathurst, New Brunswick. At 25, he was officiating professional games in the Central Hockey League.

In August 2012, McIsaac was signed by the National Hockey League (NHL), and was appointed to work in the American Hockey League. McIsaac was tagged to make his NHL debut on November 21, 2013, officiating the match-up between the Buffalo Sabres and Philadelphia Flyers.

== See also ==
- List of NHL on-ice officials
