= Travis Gawryletz =

Canadian ice hockey player and official (born 1985)

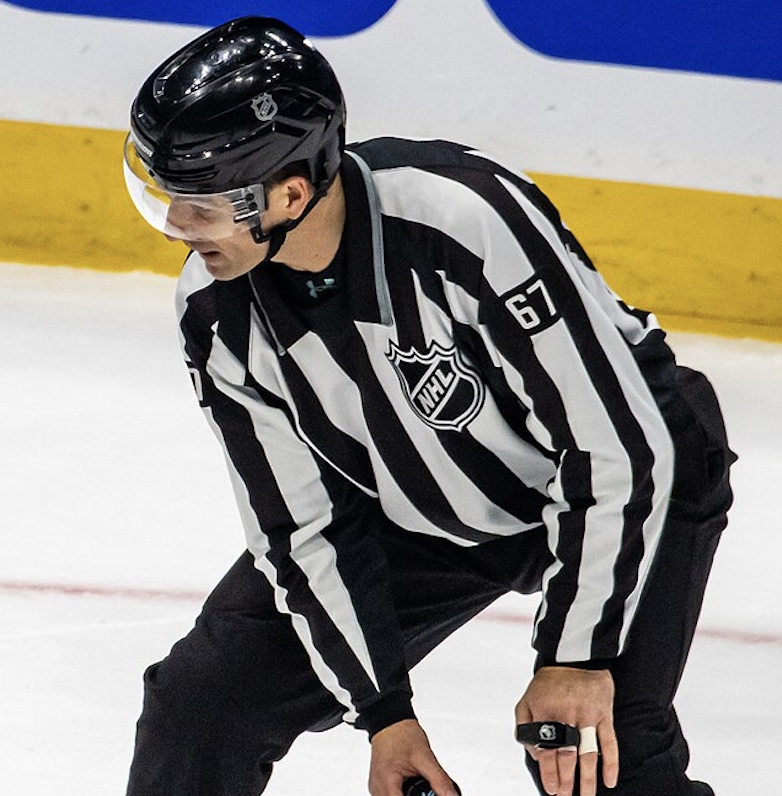
- Gawryletz in the 2023 Stanley Cup playoffs
- Born: November 2, 1985 (age 40); Trail, British Columbia, Canada
- Education: University of Minnesota Duluth
- Occupation: Ice hockey linesman
- Years active: 2017–present
- Employer: National Hockey League
Ice hockey career
- Height: 6 ft 2 in (188 cm)
- Weight: 201 lb (91 kg; 14 st 5 lb)
- Position: Defense
- Shot: Right
- Played for: Lake Erie Monsters; HC Karlovy Vary; HC Sparta Praha; HC Pardubice; Székesfehérvár
- NHL draft: 253rd overall, 2004; Philadelphia Flyers
- Playing career: 2008–2014

Travis Gawryletz (/ɡɑːrlɛtz/ GAHR-lehtz; born November 2, 1985) is a Canadian former professional ice hockey player and current linesman for the National Hockey League. He made his officiating debut during the 2017–18 NHL season and as of the start of the 2024–25 season he has worked 432 regular season games and 8 Stanley Cup playoff games. He wears uniform number 67.

== Playing career ==
Gawryletz played Junior hockey with the Trail Smoke Eaters of the British Columbia Hockey League and became the first Smoke Eater to be selected straight from the BCHL when he was drafted 253rd overall in the 2004 NHL entry draft by the Philadelphia Flyers. He was then recruited to the University of Minnesota-Duluth to play collegiate hockey in the Western Collegiate Hockey Association. Selected for his size by the Flyers, Gawryletz developed into a physical defensive defenceman among the Bulldogs d-corps and in his four-year career with Duluth, Travis appeared in 140 games with only 23 points.

Unsigned from the Flyers after completing his college career Gawryletz signed as a free agent with the Elmira Jackals of the ECHL before attending the AHL's Rochester Americans training camp prior to his first professional season in 2008–09. Gawryletz established himself within the Jackals with gritty defensive play and posted 16 points in 56 games to be named the Jackals top defenceman for the season.

Gawryletz was again invited to the Amerks AHL training camp but re-signed with the Jackals to start the 2009–10 season. Leading the Jackals and placing second in the ECHL in plus/minus after 16 games, he was loaned to make his AHL debut with the Lake Erie Monsters on November 27, 2010. Gawryletz's solid contributions on the blueline meant he remained with the Monsters for the duration of their season, leading all defenceman and placing second on the team with a plus/minus of 11, before returning to Elmira for the ECHL playoffs.

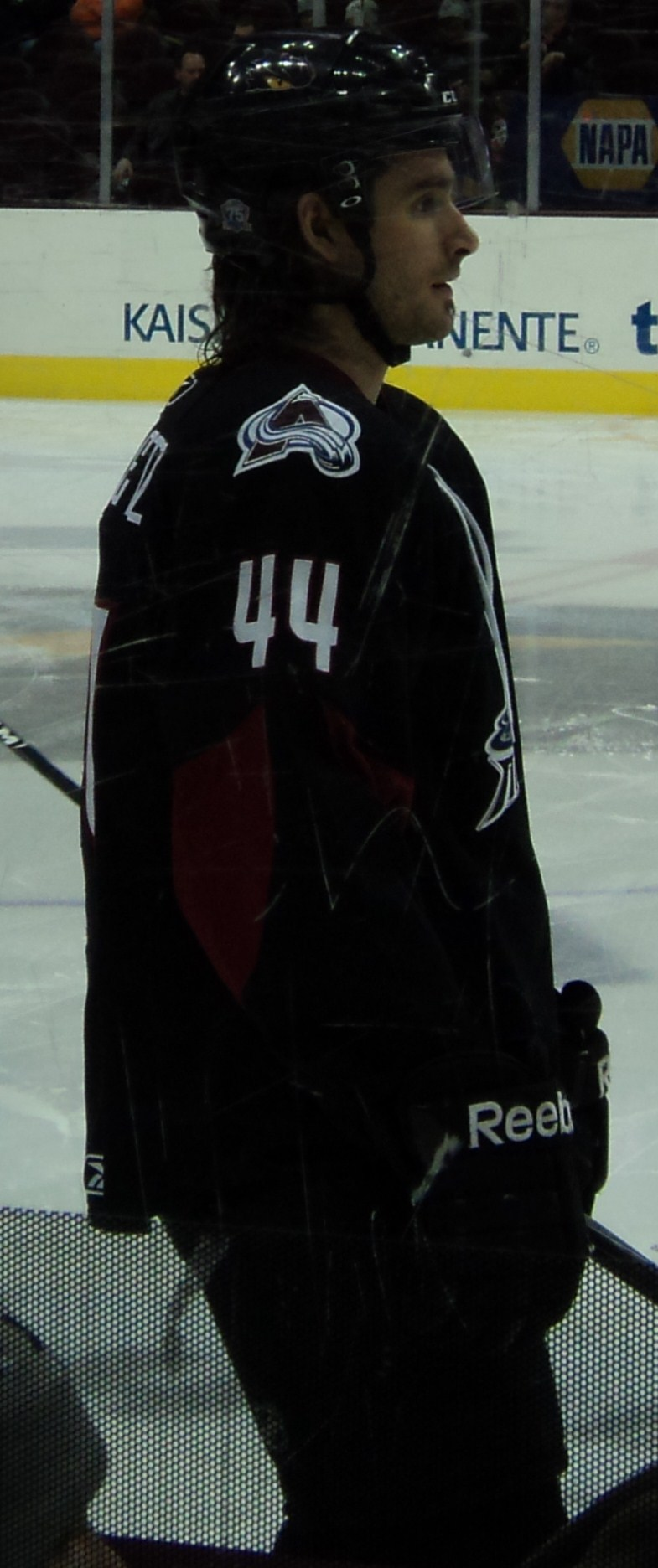
Gawryletz with the Lake Erie Monsters in 2010

In mid-April, on the back of a successful season, Gawryletz signed a one-year contract to return to the Lake Erie Monsters for the 2010–11 season.

Despite two successful seasons with the Monsters, Gawryletz did not garner NHL interest. He attended the Manchester Monarchs training camp, before signing a one-year contract with ECHL team, the Ontario Reign. After just two games with the Reign, Gawryletz signed in Europe with HC Karlovy Vary of the Czech Extraliga on October 19, 2011.

Unable to help prevent Karlovy Vary stay out of a relegation battle at season's end, Gawryletz impressed and was signed to a one-year contract by powerhouse rivals, HC Sparta Praha on May 2, 2012. In the 2012–13 season, Gawryletz appeared in 19 games with just three assists for Sparta before he was released to join his third Czech club, HC Pardubice, for the remainder of the season on November 28, 2012.

On July 15, 2013, Gawryletz opted to join the Austrian Hockey League and signed a one-year contract with Hungarian participant Alba Volán Székesfehérvár. After 18 games with Alba, Gawryletz opted to terminate his contract and return to North America on November 6, 2013. On January 7, 2014, Gawryletz signed a contract with the Bakersfield Condors of the ECHL but retired soon after.

== Officiating career ==
Following his retirement as a player, Gawryletz worked as a linesman for the Western Hockey League for three seasons. He officiated his first AHL game in March 2017, and signed an NHL minor league contract that summer. He made his NHL debut on November 8, 2017, officiating a game between the Tampa Bay Lightning and San Jose Sharks alongside referees Brad Watson and Ian Walsh, and linesman Michel Cormier.

Prior to the start of the 2018-19 NHL season, Gawryletz was promoted to a full-time spot on the officiating roster. His first playoff assignment was game one of the 2023 Stanley Cup playoff series between the Boston Bruins and the Florida Panthers. He also officiated in the 2024 Stanley Cup playoffs.

== Personal life ==
Gawryletz currently lives in Kelowna, British Columbia with his wife and son. His older brother, Brandon, is also an NHL official.

== Career statistics ==
			Regular season					Playoffs
Season	Team	League	GP	G	A	Pts	PIM	GP	G	A	Pts	PIM
2001–02	Beaver Valley Nitehawks	KIJHL	45	13	17	30	99	—	—	—	—	—
2001–02	Trail Smoke Eaters	BCHL	6	0	1	1	0	—	—	—	—	—
2002–03	Trail Smoke Eaters	BCHL	56	4	28	32	42	—	—	—	—	—
2003–04	Trail Smoke Eaters	BCHL	51	9	21	30	51	10	1	3	4	6
2004–05	University of Minnesota Duluth	WCHA	35	4	1	5	26	—	—	—	—	—
2005–06	University of Minnesota Duluth	WCHA	32	0	7	7	12	—	—	—	—	—
2006–07	University of Minnesota Duluth	WCHA	37	0	5	5	57	—	—	—	—	—
2007–08	University of Minnesota Duluth	WCHA	36	1	5	6	30	—	—	—	—	—
2008–09	Elmira Jackals	ECHL	56	2	14	16	40	11	0	2	2	8
2009–10	Elmira Jackals	ECHL	16	2	4	6	2	5	0	0	0	6
2009–10	Lake Erie Monsters	AHL	51	2	10	12	35	—	—	—	—	—
2010–11	Lake Erie Monsters	AHL	69	4	14	18	46	—	—	—	—	—
2011–12	Ontario Reign	ECHL	2	0	0	0	0	—	—	—	—	—
2011–12	HC Energie Karlovy Vary	ELH	33	4	8	12	20	—	—	—	—	—
2012–13	HC Sparta Praha	ELH	19	0	3	3	12	—	—	—	—	—
2012–13	HC ČSOB Pojišťovna Pardubice	ELH	27	1	2	3	8	5	0	0	0	4
2013–14	SAPA Fehérvár AV19	AUT	18	0	0	0	6	—	—	—	—	—
2013–14	Bakersfield Condors	ECHL	13	1	1	2	4	—	—	—	—	—
ECHL totals			87	5	19	24	46	16	0	2	2	14
AHL totals			120	6	24	30	81	—	—	—	—	—
ELH totals			79	5	13	18	40	5	0	0	0	4

== See also ==
- List of NHL on-ice officials
