= Neil Armstrong (ice hockey) =

Canadian ice hockey official (1932–2020)

- Born: David Neil Armstrong; December 20, 1932; Plympton, Ontario, Canada
- Died: December 6, 2020 (aged 87); Sarnia, Ontario, Canada
- Occupation: Ice hockey linesman
- Years active: 1957–1978
- Employer: National Hockey League
Ice hockey career
- Hockey Hall of Fame, 1991 (Official)

David Neil Armstrong (December 20, 1932 – December 6, 2020) was a Canadian professional ice hockey linesman and an Honoured Member of the Hockey Hall of Fame.

== Early life ==
Armstrong was born in Plympton, Ontario. He began playing minor hockey in Galt, Ontario, and was offered a chance to officiate games. Armstrong accepted and later earned his Ontario Hockey Association certification.

== Career ==
Armstrong officiated his first National Hockey League game on November 17, 1957, when he was 24. In the game, which was between the Boston Bruins and Toronto Maple Leafs, the two teams got into a brawl near the end of the game. Armstrong broke up a fight involving Fern Flaman, who later skated up to him with his arm dangling and proclaimed "You broke my arm!". However it turned out that Flaman was joking.

During his career, he had only been seriously injured once and had never missed any games, which helped him gain the nickname "ironman". His one major injury came in 1971 when Philadelphia Flyers player Gary Dornhoefer fell along the boards, and knocked Armstrong up against the glass. Dornhoefer's stick cut Armstrong's hand and broke a bone, forcing him to wear a cast for three months. On October 16, 1973, Armstrong was honoured in a ceremony at the Detroit Olympia for officiating his 1,314th game, which broke the previous record set by George Hayes.

In total, Armstrong officiated a total of 1,744 games and retired in 1978. After retiring, he became a scout for the Montreal Canadiens. He was inducted into the Hockey Hall of Fame as an official in 1991.

== Personal life ==
Armstrong had two children, daughter Lezleigh and son, Doug Armstrong, who became general manager of the Dallas Stars. Following his tenure with Dallas, Doug became the executive vice president and general manager of the St. Louis Blues and won the Stanley Cup in 2019.

== See also ==
- List of members of the Hockey Hall of Fame
- List of NHL on-ice officials
