= Shandor Alphonso =

Canadian ice hockey linesman (born 1984)

- Born: May 24, 1984 (age 42); Orangeville, Ontario, Canada
- Education: Lakehead University
- Occupation: Ice hockey linesman
- Years active: 2014–present
- Employer: National Hockey League

Shandor Alphonso (born May 24, 1984) is a Canadian ice hockey linesman, currently working in the National Hockey League. He has worn sweater number 52 since joining the NHL prior to the start of the 2014-15 season. Alphonso has officiated 664 regular season games and 37 Stanley Cup playoff games as of the start of the 2024–25 season.

== Playing career ==
Alphonso played minor hockey with the OMHA’s Halton Hurricanes, and was chosen in the 7th round (140th overall) of the 2000 OHL Priority Selection by the Sudbury Wolves. He spent three seasons with Sudbury, picking up 73 points in 183 games. After spending the 2004–05 season in the OPJHL, he played five years at Lakehead Thunderwolves men's ice hockey before finishing his playing career in the WOAA with the Shelburne Muskies. Alphonso was a left winger.

== Officiating career ==
Prior to the 2009-10 season, Alphonso attended the NHL's Amateur Exposure Combine, a program for former junior and college players who had an interest in becoming an official. He decided to become an official, instead of continuing his playing career.

On 25 September 2011, Alphonso worked his first Ontario Hockey League game in Oshawa, as the Sault Ste. Marie Greyhounds played against the Oshawa Generals.

He attended the combine again (then called the Officials Exposure Combine), in 2014, before signing a minor league contract that September. His first NHL game came on 17 October 2014, when the Florida Panthers faced off against the Buffalo Sabres in Buffalo. In 2015 (his first season under the contract), he worked the American Hockey League's Calder Cup final series between the Utica Comets and Manchester Monarchs.

Before the 2016-17 season, Alphonso was promoted to a full-time NHL linesman.

On 14 February 2017, Alphonso was slashed in the leg by Anaheim Ducks centre Antoine Vermette, who was reportedly unhappy with a faceoff conducted by Alphonso. Alphonso did not suffer any injury on the play, but Vermette was assessed a game misconduct and was suspended 10 games by the league the next day.

== Personal life ==
Before he joined the NHL's officiating staff in 2014, Alphonso had worked for RBC Bank as a financial planner. He left the company in October of that same year.

== Career statistics ==
=== Regular season and playoffs ===
			Regular season					Playoffs
Season	Team	League	GP	G	A	Pts	PIM	GP	G	A	Pts	PIM
2000–01	Orangeville Crushers	MWJHL	47	11	11	22	67	—	—	—	—	—
2001–02	Sudbury Wolves	OHL	58	4	14	18	37	5	0	0	0	2
2002–03	Sudbury Wolves	OHL	66	15	21	36	60	—	—	—	—	—
2003–04	Sudbury Wolves	OHL	59	6	13	19	46	6	0	1	1	6
2004–05	Milton Icehawks	OPJHL	42	22	35	57	45	11	6	8	14	16
2005–06	Lakehead Thunderwolves	CIS	21	2	4	6	36	—	—	—	—	—
2006–07	Lakehead Thunderwolves	CIS	26	2	5	7	20	—	—	—	—	—
2007–08	Lakehead Thunderwolves	CIS	26	5	4	9	29	—	—	—	—	—
2008–09	Lakehead Thunderwolves	CIS	14	2	1	3	24	—	—	—	—	—
2009–10	Lakehead Thunderwolves	CIS	24	7	8	15	12	—	—	—	—	—
2010–11	Shelburne Muskies	WOAA	12	1	7	8	8	—	—	—	—	—
OHL totals			183	25	48	73	143	11	0	1	1	8
CIS totals			111	18	22	40	121	—	—	—	—	—

== See also ==
- List of NHL on-ice officials
