= Frederick L'Ecuyer =

Canadian ice hockey referee

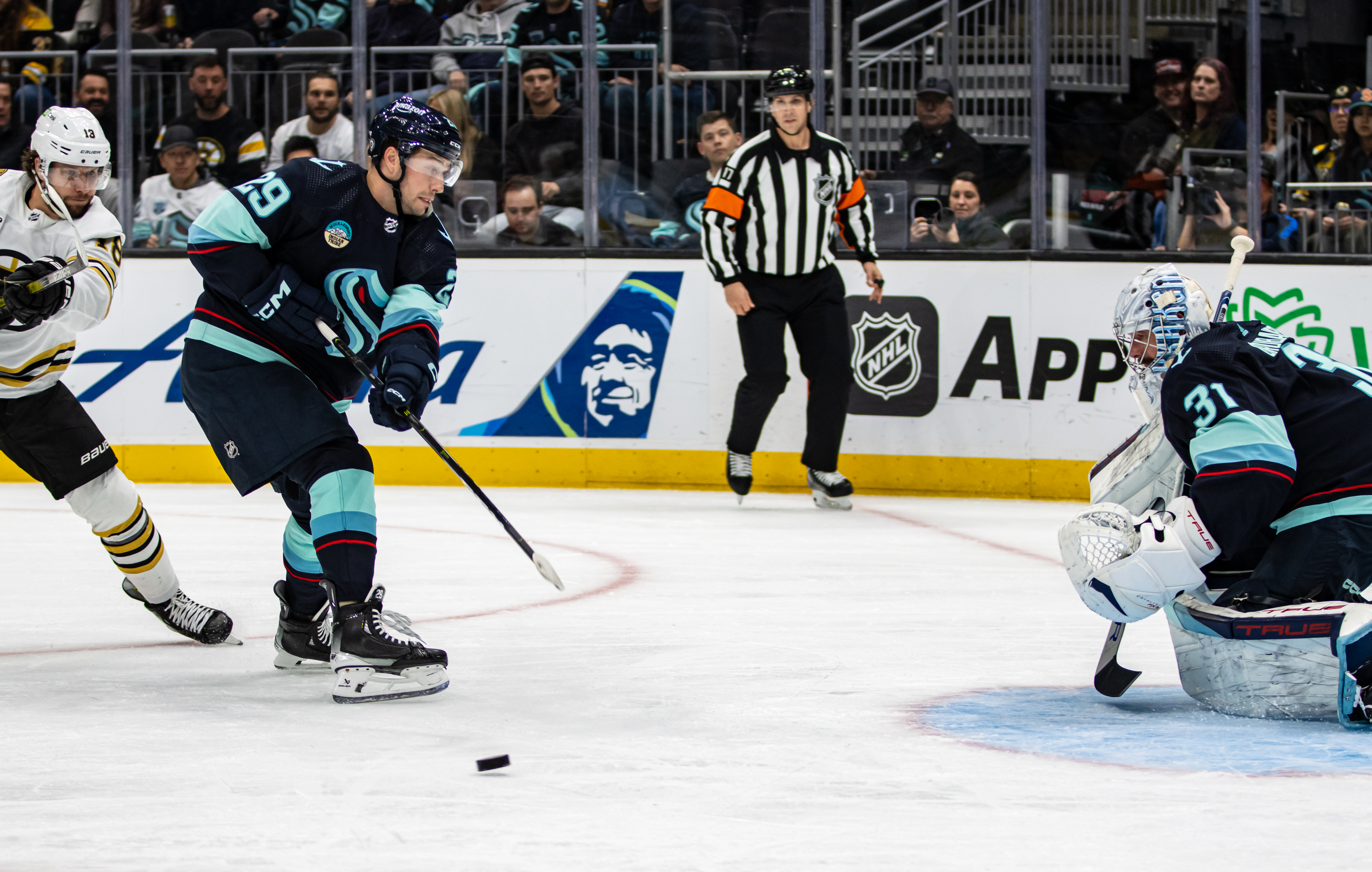
- L'Ecuyer watches a net front play in 2024
- Born: July 28, 1977 (age 49); Saint-Tite, Quebec, Canada
- Occupation: Ice hockey referee
- Years active: 2007–present
- Employer: National Hockey League

Frederick L'Ecuyer (born 28 July 1977) is a Canadian ice hockey referee, employed by the National Hockey League. He has worn the number 17 since the start of the 2010–11 NHL season. As of the start of the 2024–25 season, he has officiated 1,033 regular season games and 44 Stanley Cup playoff games.

== Early life and career ==
Frederick L'Ecuyer was born and raised in Saint-Tite, Quebec, located north of Trois-Rivières. He played as a centre until deciding to focus on refereeing at age 16.

=== Quebec Major Junior Hockey League ===
L'Ecuyer's first Quebec Major Junior Hockey League game came in the 1999-00 QMJHL season, when he worked as a linesman. Starting in the 2000-01 QMJHL season, he would make the move to become a referee, working 57 regular season and 13 playoff games over a span of three seasons.

== Professional career ==
=== Central Hockey League ===
Before the start of the 2002-03 CHL season, L'Ecuyer was hired to become a full-time referee for the Central Hockey League. His first game as an official in the league was on 18 October 2002, in a game involving the El Paso Buzzards and the San Angelo Saints.

Between the fall of 2002 and the summer of 2006, he was named to be the official at the league's All-Star Game in 2005 and also officiated three Ray Miron President's Cup finals.

=== American Hockey League ===
L'Ecuyer worked in the American Hockey League on a part-time basis starting at the beginning of the 2003-04 AHL season. His first game in the league occurred on 11 October 2003, when the Utah Grizzlies and the San Antonio Rampage played at the AT&T Center.

During his time in the league, L'Ecuyer saw two appearances in the Calder Cup finals: 2009 and 2010.

=== National Hockey League ===
L'Ecuyer was hired by the National Hockey League prior to the start of the 2007-08 NHL season. On 11 October 2007, he made his National Hockey League debut, when he officiated a game between the New York Islanders and the Toronto Maple Leafs at the Air Canada Centre. For his first game and through the time he was on an AHL/NHL contract, he wore sweater number 48.

Before the start of the 2010-11 NHL season, L'Ecuyer was promoted to a full-time spot on the officiating roster. His first game that season was one between the Buffalo Sabres and the Ottawa Senators at what is now known as the Canadian Tire Centre.

L'Ecuyer officiated his 1,000th game in the NHL on March 14, 2024, between the Tampa Bay Lightning the New York Rangers. He became the 48th referee to achieve the milestone, and the seventh from Quebec.

==== Stanley Cup playoffs ====
L'Ecuyer made his on-ice playoff debut during the 2011 Stanley Cup playoffs. He was the standby official for Game Three between the Washington Capitals and the New York Rangers at Madison Square Garden. At 3:44 of the second period, play was halted due to an injury sustained by Chris Rooney. As per NHL rule during the playoffs, a standby official is named to every game. As Rooney was unable to continue, L'Ecuyer took over officiating duties.

For the 2015 Stanley Cup playoffs, L'Ecuyer was named as one of the 20 officials who would work regular games in the first round.

== Personal life ==
L'Ecuyer lives in Raleigh, North Carolina.

== See also ==
- List of NHL on-ice officials
