= Name (sports) =

Name worn on a sports uniform

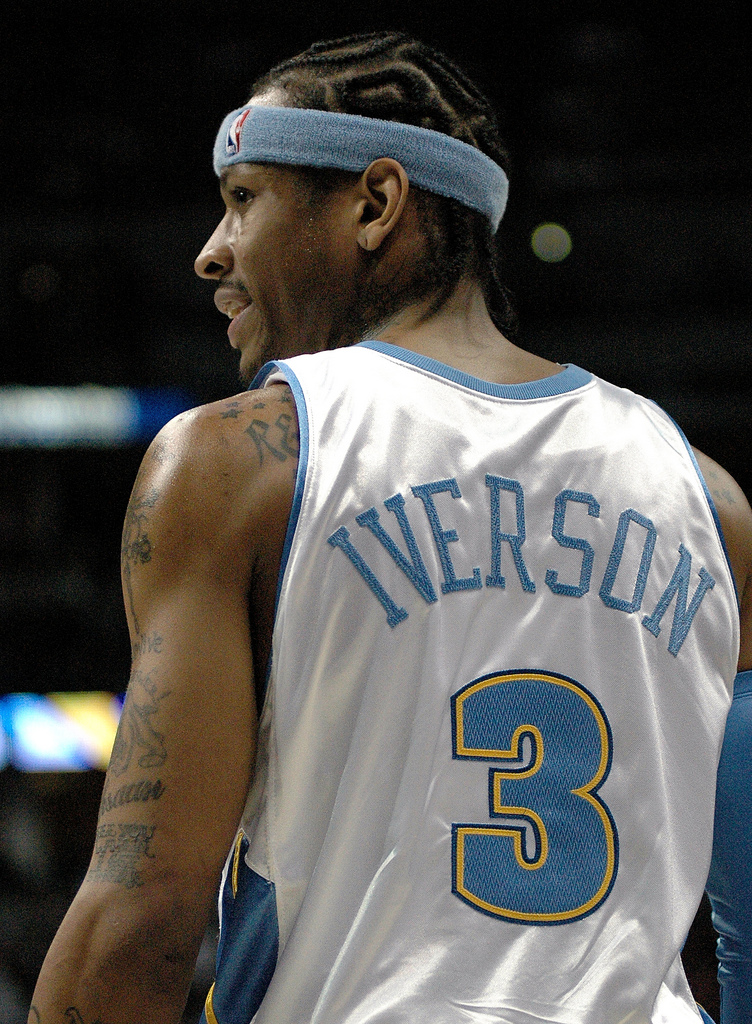
Allen Iverson with his name displayed on his Denver Nuggets jersey in 2007

In sport, particularly team sports, the player name, often referred to as the uniform name, squad name, jersey name, shirt name is the name worn on a player's uniform.

Originally the number worn on a player's uniform was used to identify and distinguish each players (and sometimes others, such as coaches and officials) from others wearing the same or similar uniforms.

Generally, a surname is used, but a nickname is also common. The name is typically displayed on the rear of the jersey, often accompanied by the number. Traditionally, the name sits above the number, but sometimes teams will place the name below the number. In women's basketball, it is very common for teams to wear names below the player's number to avoid the player's name being blocked by long hair. Name printing is also used from a sports marketing point, such as to promote the player to fans and jersey sales.

== Association football ==
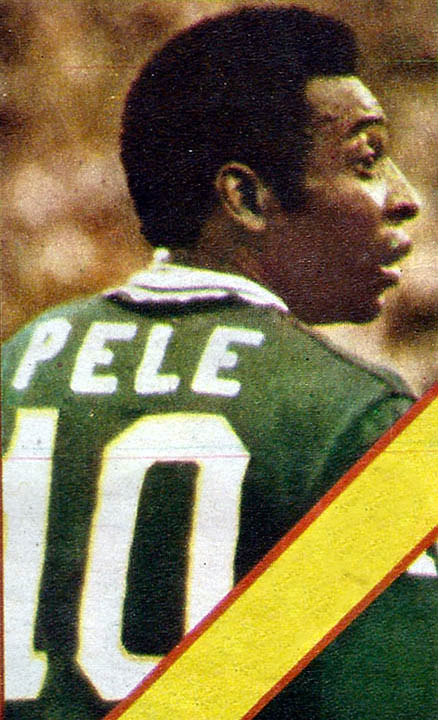
Brazilian star Edson Arantes do Nascimento with his nickname, Pelé, on the New York Cosmos jersey in 1977. The NASL was pioneer in the use of players' names on shirts

In association football, the first record of numbered jerseys date back to 1911, with Australian teams Sydney Leichardt and HMS Powerful being the first to use squad numbers on their backs. The 1950 FIFA World Cup was the first FIFA competition to see squad numbers for all players, but persistent numbers would not be issued until the 1954 World Cup, where each man in a country's 22-man squad wore a specific number from 1 to 22 for the duration of the tournament.

In the 1970s, the U.S.-based North American Soccer League experimented with printing players' names on their shirts and allocating each player a squad number rather than simply numbering the 11 players starting a game from 1 to 11, but these ideas did not catch on at the time in other countries.

On 22 August 1979, during a 1979–80 Coppa Italia game against AC Milan, Italian team Monza displayed the players' names above the numbers on the back, a novelty at the time dubbed "all'Americana" (American style); the Italian Football Federation did not approve of the change and fined the club. Shortly after, AC Milan themselves added names to players' shirts in 1980. The names were removed in 1981 and for many years they would not be adopted by any other team in Italy.

In 1994 FIFA World Cup, FIFA made changes to the jersey, adding squad numbers to the front in addition to the back and adding player names to the back of the jerseys for the first time. These modifications were implemented to make it easier for television and radio broadcasters to identify players. In the North American Soccer League of the 1970s, UEFA Euro 1992, 1992 Olympic Football and 1993–94 FA Premier League, names on jerseys were also used, but after 1994 FIFA World Cup, they became more commonly used in various football competitions worldwide.

== Baseball ==
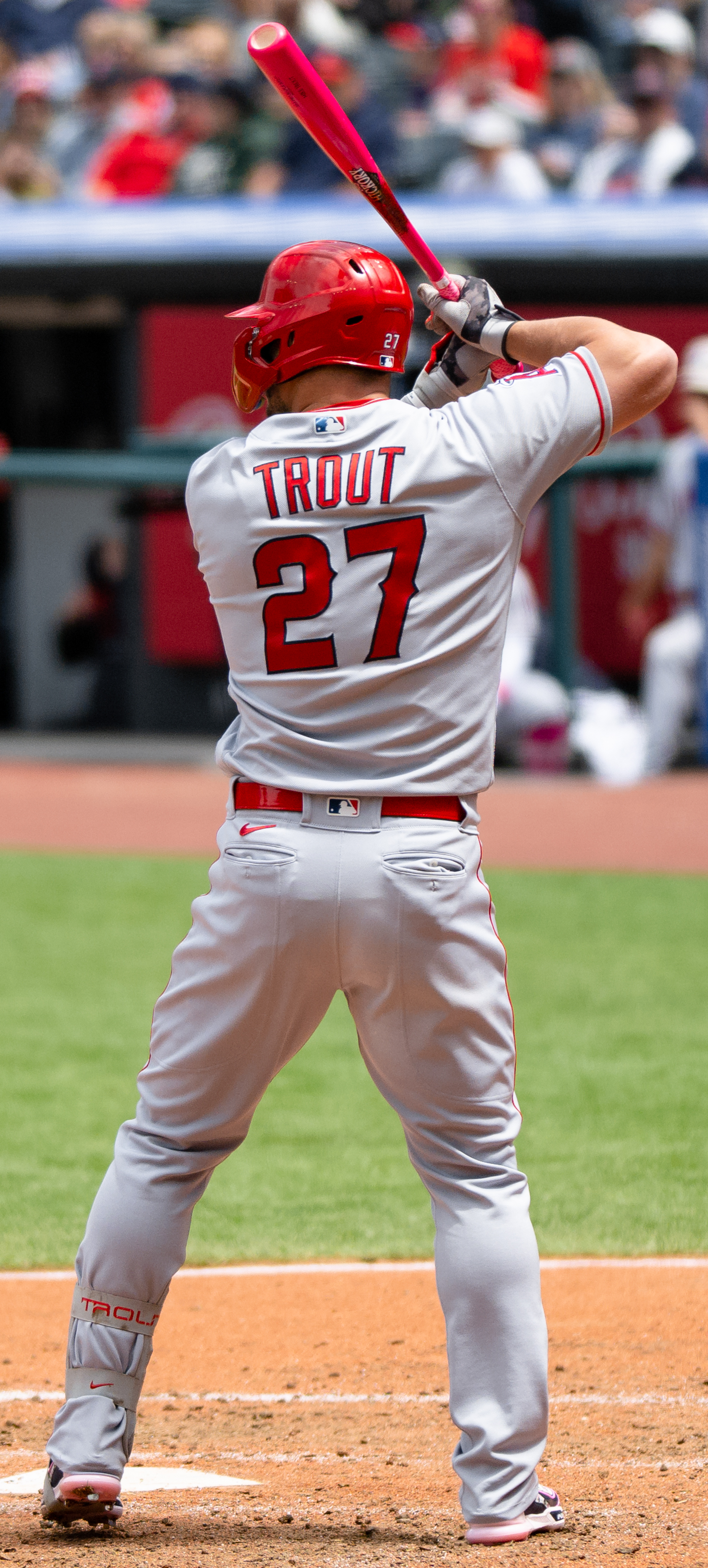
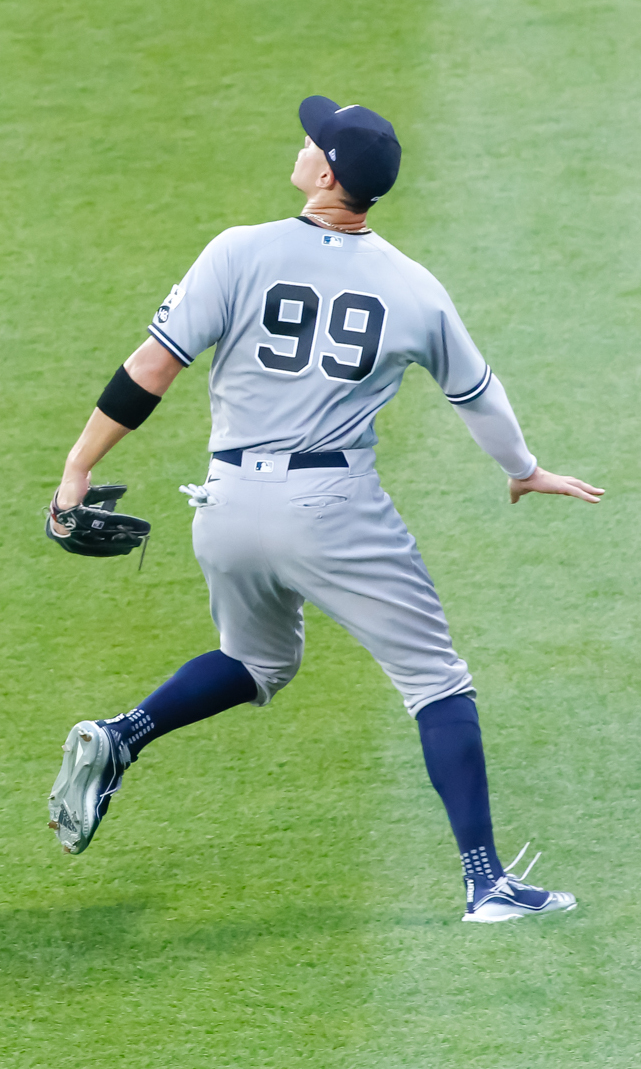
Mike Trout, left, wearing the uniform of the Los Angeles Angels. Aaron Judge, right, in the uniform of the New York Yankees, the only MLB team without names on their uniforms.

In Major League Baseball, uniform numbers were not introduced until 1929 by the New York Yankees and Cleveland Indians; names on uniforms were introduced in 1960 by the Bill Veeck of Chicago White Sox.

During the 1960s and 1970s, Athletics owner Charles O. Finley often had his players wear jerseys with nicknames on the back. This was replicated by the Atlanta Braves later in the decade.

In 2017, MLB began Players Weekend, during which players were encouraged to pick a nickname to wear in place of their traditional surname (or, in the case of Ichiro Suzuki, his given name) on the back of their jersey. In the 2018 edition of Players Weekend, Arizona Diamondbacks pitcher Brad Boxberger put his name on the back of his jersey in the form of emojis ("📦🍔") instead of letters.

Almost every team in Major League Baseball uses names on at least one of their uniforms. The only team that does not wear a uniform with a name is the New York Yankees. The Yankees do not have player names printing because of team tradition and philosophy, arguing that baseball is a team sport and not having player names emphasizes the value and importance of teamwork and unity over individual stardom.

== Basketball ==
In the NBA, team jerseys have the player's last name on the back of the jersey. Most teams wear names above the player's number, although there are some that wear names below the number.

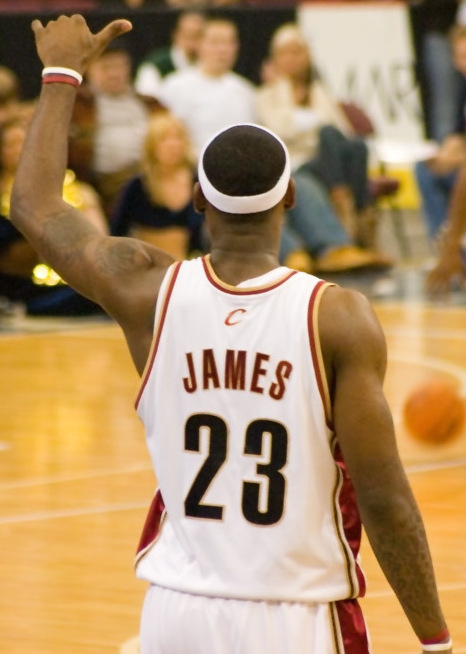
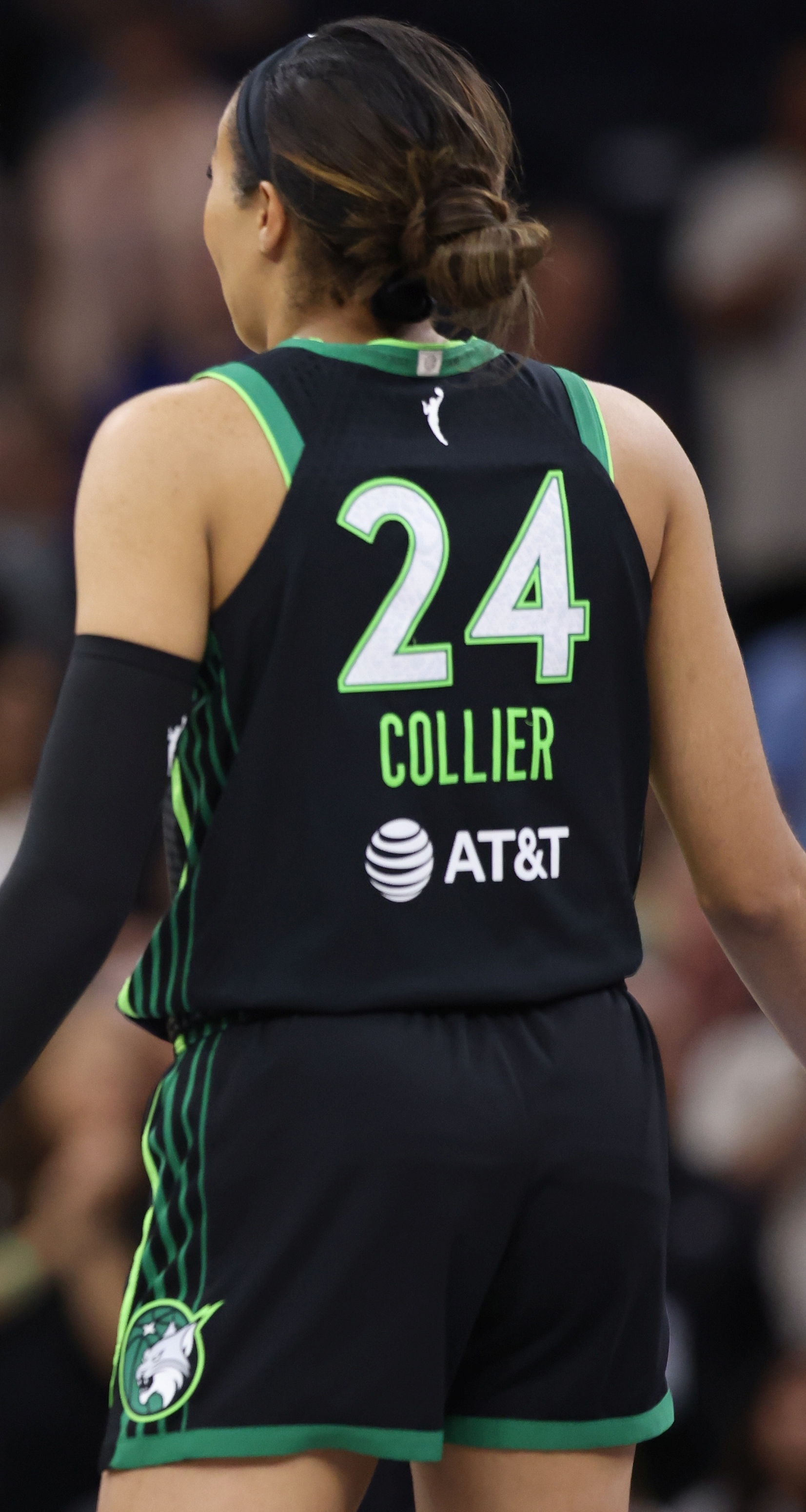
NBA jerseys, like the one LeBron James is wearing, typically have the player's name above the number. On WNBA jerseys, like the one being worn by Napheesa Collier, the name is placed below the number.

While it is standard for players to wear their surname on their jersey, the NBA has a history of players wearing nicknames on their jersey. Famously, "Pistol" Pete Maravich wore "Pistol" on his back during his time with the Atlanta Hawks and New Orleans/Utah Jazz. Other NBA players to wear nicknames include: Walt Bellamy, who wore "Bells"; Elvin Hayes, who wore "E"; Jan van Breda Kolff, who wore "VBK"; and Nick Weatherspoon, who wore "Spoon" on his jersey. In January 2014, the Miami Heat and Brooklyn Nets played a game with every player wearing their nickname on the back of their jersey, in place of their last name. LeBron James of the Miami Heat, for example, wore a jersey that said "King James" on the back instead of his normal "James". Andrei Kirilenko of the Nets wore a jersey with his name in his native Russian alphabet.

For NBA games on Christmas Day in 2014, the NBA introduced special uniforms to be worn only on Christmas by the 10 teams playing that day. These jerseys featured each player's first name on the back, below the number. For example, John Wall's Washington Wizards jersey said "John" on the back instead of "Wall."

In college basketball, teams have the option to use player's last name and jersey number on the back or just the jersey number on the back of the player's jersey. In high school basketball, typically only the jersey number is used on the back of the player's jersey, but names are legal according to NFHS rules.

Players wearing their name under the number is very common in women's basketball, where players often have long hair that would obscure the name on the top of their back.

== Cricket ==
In one-day international cricket, player names have appeared on uniform shirts since the late 1980s. According to International Cricket Council (ICC) rules, the name must "correctly reflect the identity of the player". Methods of disambiguating players with the same surname vary. For example, Australian twin brothers Mark Waugh and Steve Waugh used their first and last names, while Indian players Arshdeep Singh and Rinku Singh (no relation) wear their first names alone.

The ICC added player names to Test cricket shirts in 2019. They were first seen used in the 2019 Ashes series.

== Gridiron football ==
In gridiron football, which includes American football and Canadian football, names on jerseys are used frequently and are mandatory in current professional play. In college football and high school football, where team rosters are often in excess of 100 players, there may be multiple players with the same uniform number; player names help with disambiguation between the players. Some schools may choose not to print player names on uniforms either for financial or philosophical reasons; Penn State, Notre Dame, and USC are examples of the latter. Army's football team uses "ARMY" with the jersey number on the back of the jerseys instead of the player's last name.

The original 2001 incarnation of the XFL infamously allowed players to replace their surnames with a nickname of their choosing; the most well-known of these was Rod Smart who chose to put the phrase "He Hate Me" on his uniform. In 2018, players at Temple were allowed to replace their surnames with their Twitter account handles for their annual spring game as a promotional stunt.

== Ice hockey ==
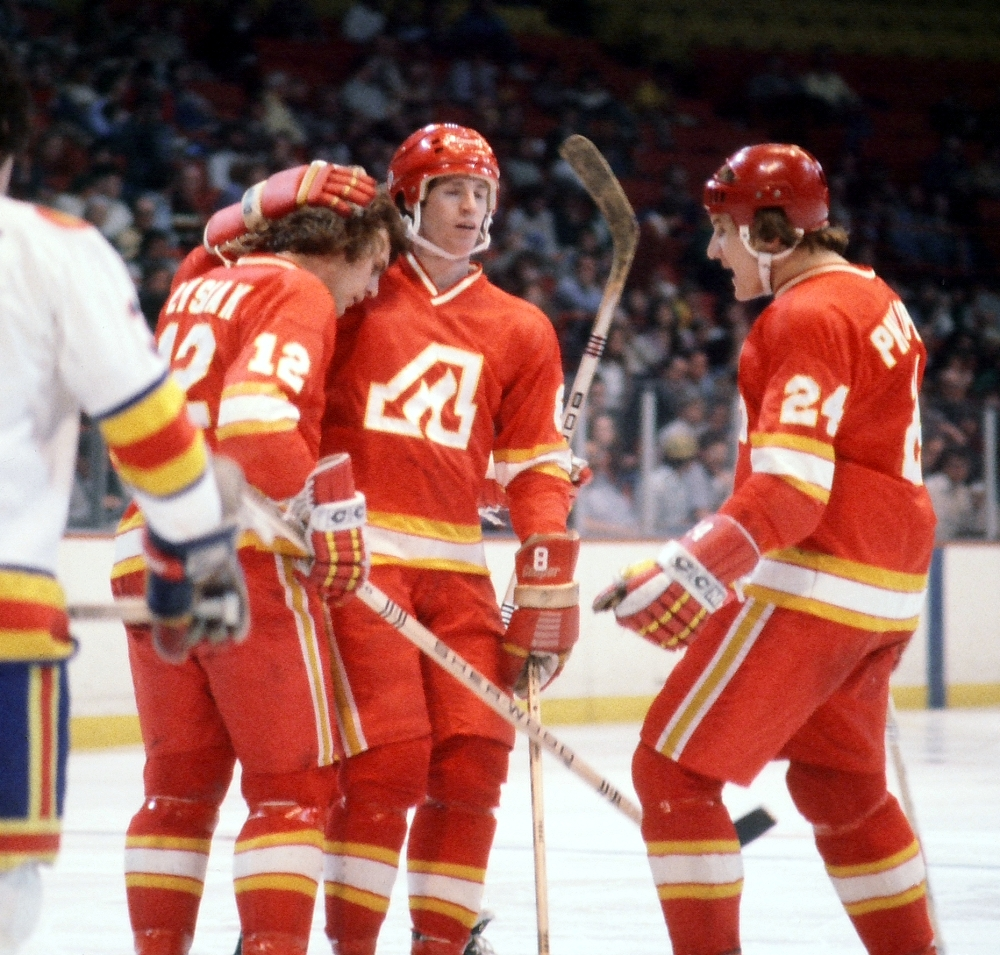
Players of Atlanta Flames celebrating a game in the 1977–78 season, the first when NHL teams had to add players names to jerseys

The first professional sports team to wear names on the back of their jerseys was the NHL's New York Americans in the 1925–26 season. Tommy Gorman, the head coach, was inspired by amateur hockey teams and put names on the back of his players' jerseys to help identify them. The Americans eventually ditched the names, but Conn Smythe's Toronto Maple Leafs wore cursive names on their backs in at least one season, 1930–31.

In 1970, the NHL began the policy of teams wearing their white uniforms at home. In the same season, the New York Rangers added names to the back of their white jerseys. Various other teams followed suit through the 1970s.

At the start of the 1977–78 season, the National Hockey League (NHL) placed into effect a rule that also required players' sweaters to display the names of the players wearing them in addition to their number, but Toronto Maple Leafs owner Harold Ballard initially refused to follow the new rule, fearing that he would not be able to sell programs at his team's games.

The NHL responded by threatening to levy a fine on the team in February 1978, so Ballard complied by making the letters the same colour as the background they were on, which for the team's road jerseys was blue. The NHL threatened further sanctions, and despite playing more than one game with their "unreadable" sweaters, Ballard's Maple Leafs finally complied in earnest by making the blue jerseys' letters white.

== See also ==
- Number (sports)
