= John D'Amico (ice hockey) =

Canadian ice hockey official

- Born: September 21, 1937; Toronto, Ontario, Canada
- Died: May 29, 2005 (aged 67)
- Occupation: Ice hockey linesman
- Years active: 1964–1988
- Employer: National Hockey League
Ice hockey career
- Hockey Hall of Fame, 1993 (Official)

John David D'Amico (September 21, 1937 – May 29, 2005) was a Canadian National Hockey League (NHL) linesman and later supervisor of officials.

== Early life and education ==
A native of Toronto, D'Amico graduated from De La Salle College.

== Career ==
D'Amico's NHL career began as a referee on October 12, 1964, when he was 27 years old. He refereed only 19 games before becoming a linesman.

At the time of his retirement after the 1987 season, D'Amico was the last on-ice official active during the Original Six era. D'Amico's career included 1,689 regular season games, seven All-Star games, including the 1979 Challenge Cup and Rendez-vous '87, and 247 Stanley Cup playoff games, including 52 Stanley Cup Finals. His last one was in 1987. He also worked the Canada Cup. In 1988, D'Amico was watching a Leafs game on TV at home when a linesman had to leave a game because of an injury. In response, D'Amico arrived at Maple Leaf Gardens and finished the game, marking his final on-ice performance as an NHL linesman.

After retirement, he became a supervisor of officials for the NHL until his death in 2005. D'Amico was inducted into the Hockey Hall of Fame in 1993.

== Personal life ==
His health problems started in September 2002 when he suffered a heart attack and underwent bypass surgery. Tests following surgery indicated blood abnormalities and a diagnosis of aplastic anemia, which resulted in gallstone problems.

Just before his death, D'Amico made news headlines across Canada when he spoke out about the poor quality of the country's health care system.

D'Amico and his wife, Dorothy, had three sons and one daughter.

== See also ==
- List of members of the Hockey Hall of Fame
- List of NHL on-ice officials
