= Dean Warren =

Ice hockey official

Dean Warren is a former ice hockey official, best known for working in the National Hockey League.

== NHL career ==
In April 2008, Warren was fired by the NHL for what the league said was "substandard performance". Warren had not worked in the playoffs after the 2006 season, which gave the league the right to release him from his contract through the union's collective bargaining agreement. He claimed that when he became the Vice-President of the NHL Officials Association in 2006, he noticed "league bias against him". A year before his termination, e-mails were sent during an exchange between Stephen Walkom and Colin Campbell; the e-mails were sent after a 24 February 2007 game between the Florida Panthers and Boston Bruins. Campbell suggested that "there must be a way to get rid of this guy".

The move came as a surprise to some of the members of the NHLOA; linesman Brian Murphy said that he was "surprised that any official could fall that far that fast". Other officials critiqued Warren post-firing, with referee Paul Devorski calling him "horse shit".

In 2009, one year after his release from the league, Warren went to the Ontario Labour Relations Board in an attempt to be re-hired. While the Board ruled against his request, the Ontario Superior Court stepped in when it came to severance pay. The Court said that the NHL had to pay Warren his severance, even though the OLRB said too much time passed after he was released. In an April 2016 letter to Warren's lawyer, the NHL said they would take the case to the Supreme Court.
