= Ron Fournier (radio personality) =

Ronald Fournier (born August 3, 1949) is a Quebec-born radio host and sport journalist. He is also a retired professional hockey referee.

== Early life ==
Fournier was raised in Montreal. In his youth he played baseball with teammates Maurice Jr. and Normand Richard (Maurice Richard's sons) with the Braves d'Ahuntsic. When winter came, he switched to a goalie outfit with which he would be drafted with the Drummondville Rangers in the beginnings of the LHJMQ.

He was never drafted by the National Hockey League but he had already thought of becoming a referee if he couldn't get in the league as a hockey player. At the age of 19, he called the city of Montreal and the day after he was scheduled to become a referee. He then went on to do four years in the World Hockey Association followed by 10 years in the National Hockey League which he retired from in 1987.

== Radio & Journalism ==
In 1987 he became a radio host. It all started at CJMS, then switched to CKAC in 1994, a radio station based in Montreal where he hosts multiple call-in shows about sports in general, such as Bonsoir les sportifs (Good evening sportspeople) and Parlons hockey (Let's talk hockey). The first is the one he is most known for and racks up to 300,000 listeners, most of them Montreal Canadiens fans that await his prophetic words and his magnanimous phrase.

He also appears on other shows broadcast by Corus. On television, he was an intermission analyst on La Soirée du hockey (Hockey Night) on Radio-Canada. As a radio announcer he is mostly known for saying Pas pire, pas pire, pas pire (Not bad, not bad, not bad) and some would nickname him the French-Canadian Don Cherry.

== Other involvements ==
He is the current president of an eponymous hockey referee school situated in the arena in Candiac, Quebec.

The band Les Cowboys Fringants have written a song that portraits him, Salut mon Ron, which was showcased on the album Break syndical in 2002.
