= 2016 World Cup of Hockey rosters =

Each team's World Cup roster consisted of twenty skaters (forwards and defencemen) and three goaltenders. All eight participating teams submitted their initial roster of sixteen players on March 2, 2016. The remaining seven players for each nation were announced May 27.

Age and team as of July 1, 2016.

== Group A ==
=== Canada ===
Head coach: Mike Babcock

No.	Pos.	Name	Height	Weight	Birthdate	Team
50	G	Corey Crawford	1.88 m (6 ft 2 in)	94 kg (207 lb)	December 31, 1984 (aged 31)	(United States) Chicago Blackhawks
70	G	Braden Holtby	1.88 m (6 ft 2 in)	92 kg (203 lb)	September 16, 1989 (aged 27)	(United States) Washington Capitals
31	G	Carey Price	1.91 m (6 ft 3 in)	98 kg (216 lb)	August 16, 1987 (aged 29)	(Canada) Montreal Canadiens
4	D	Jay Bouwmeester	1.93 m (6 ft 4 in)	96 kg (212 lb)	September 27, 1983 (aged 32)	(United States) St. Louis Blues
88	D	Brent Burns	1.96 m (6 ft 5 in)	105 kg (231 lb)	March 9, 1985 (aged 31)	(United States) San Jose Sharks
8	D	Drew Doughty	1.85 m (6 ft 1 in)	88 kg (194 lb)	December 8, 1989 (aged 26)	(United States) Los Angeles Kings
7	D	Jake Muzzin	1.91 m (6 ft 3 in)	98 kg (216 lb)	February 21, 1989 (aged 27)	(United States) Los Angeles Kings
27	D	Alex Pietrangelo	1.91 m (6 ft 3 in)	95 kg (209 lb)	January 18, 1990 (aged 26)	(United States) St. Louis Blues
44	D	Marc-Édouard Vlasic	1.85 m (6 ft 1 in)	91 kg (201 lb)	March 30, 1987 (aged 29)	(United States) San Jose Sharks
6	D	Shea Weber (A)	1.96 m (6 ft 5 in)	107 kg (236 lb)	August 14, 1985 (aged 31)	(Canada) Montreal Canadiens
37	C	Patrice Bergeron	1.88 m (6 ft 2 in)	88 kg (194 lb)	July 24, 1985 (aged 31)	(United States) Boston Bruins
39	C	Logan Couture	1.85 m (6 ft 1 in)	88 kg (194 lb)	March 28, 1989 (aged 27)	(United States) San Jose Sharks
87	C	Sidney Crosby (C)	1.80 m (5 ft 11 in)	91 kg (201 lb)	August 7, 1987 (aged 29)	(United States) Pittsburgh Penguins
9	C	Matt Duchene	1.80 m (5 ft 11 in)	91 kg (201 lb)	January 16, 1991 (aged 25)	(United States) Colorado Avalanche
15	C	Ryan Getzlaf	1.93 m (6 ft 4 in)	100 kg (220 lb)	May 10, 1985 (aged 31)	(United States) Anaheim Ducks
28	C	Claude Giroux	1.80 m (5 ft 11 in)	84 kg (185 lb)	January 12, 1988 (aged 28)	(United States) Philadelphia Flyers
63	LW	Brad Marchand	1.75 m (5 ft 9 in)	82 kg (181 lb)	May 11, 1988 (aged 28)	(United States) Boston Bruins
90	C	Ryan O'Reilly	1.83 m (6 ft 0 in)	91 kg (201 lb)	February 7, 1991 (aged 25)	(United States) Buffalo Sabres
24	RW	Corey Perry	1.91 m (6 ft 3 in)	95 kg (209 lb)	May 16, 1985 (aged 31)	(United States) Anaheim Ducks
91	C	Steven Stamkos	1.85 m (6 ft 1 in)	88 kg (194 lb)	February 7, 1990 (aged 26)	(United States) Tampa Bay Lightning
20	C	John Tavares	1.85 m (6 ft 1 in)	93 kg (205 lb)	September 20, 1990 (aged 25)	(United States) New York Islanders
97	C	Joe Thornton	1.93 m (6 ft 4 in)	100 kg (220 lb)	July 2, 1979 (aged 37)	(United States) San Jose Sharks
16	C	Jonathan Toews (A)	1.88 m (6 ft 2 in)	94 kg (207 lb)	April 29, 1988 (aged 28)	(United States) Chicago Blackhawks

Duncan Keith, Jeff Carter, Jamie Benn, and Tyler Seguin were all originally selected, but could not participate due to injury. They were replaced by Jay Bouwmeester, Corey Perry, Logan Couture, and Ryan O'Reilly, respectively.

=== Czech Republic ===
Head coach: Josef Jandač

No.	Pos.	Name	Height	Weight	Birthdate	Team
34	G	Petr Mrázek	1.88 m (6 ft 2 in)	83 kg (183 lb)	February 14, 1992 (aged 24)	(United States) Detroit Red Wings
30	G	Michal Neuvirth	1.85 m (6 ft 1 in)	86 kg (190 lb)	March 23, 1988 (aged 28)	(United States) Philadelphia Flyers
31	G	Ondřej Pavelec	1.91 m (6 ft 3 in)	111 kg (245 lb)	August 31, 1987 (aged 29)	(Canada) Winnipeg Jets
47	D	Michal Jordán	1.85 m (6 ft 1 in)	88 kg (194 lb)	July 17, 1990 (aged 26)	Free agent
6	D	Michal Kempný	1.83 m (6 ft 0 in)	88 kg (194 lb)	September 8, 1990 (aged 26)	(United States) Chicago Blackhawks
84	D	Tomáš Kundrátek	1.83 m (6 ft 0 in)	91 kg (201 lb)	December 26, 1989 (aged 26)	(Slovakia) Slovan Bratislava
2	D	Zbyněk Michálek	1.88 m (6 ft 2 in)	95 kg (209 lb)	December 23, 1982 (aged 33)	(United States) Arizona Coyotes
33	D	Jakub Nakládal	1.88 m (6 ft 2 in)	96 kg (212 lb)	December 30, 1987 (aged 28)	Free agent
64	D	Roman Polák	1.85 m (6 ft 1 in)	108 kg (238 lb)	April 28, 1986 (aged 30)	(Canada) Toronto Maple Leafs
62	D	Andrej Šustr	2.03 m (6 ft 8 in)	102 kg (225 lb)	November 29, 1990 (aged 25)	(United States) Tampa Bay Lightning
86	LW	Michal Birner	1.83 m (6 ft 0 in)	83 kg (183 lb)	March 2, 1986 (aged 30)	(Russia) Traktor Chelyabinsk
10	LW	Roman Červenka	1.81 m (5 ft 11 in)	86 kg (190 lb)	December 10, 1985 (aged 30)	(Switzerland) Fribourg-Gottéron
12	C	Radek Faksa	1.91 m (6 ft 3 in)	95 kg (209 lb)	January 9, 1994 (aged 22)	(United States) Dallas Stars
67	RW	Michael Frolík	1.88 m (6 ft 2 in)	87 kg (192 lb)	February 17, 1988 (aged 28)	(Canada) Calgary Flames
11	C	Martin Hanzal	1.98 m (6 ft 6 in)	107 kg (236 lb)	February 20, 1987 (aged 29)	(United States) Arizona Coyotes
83	RW	Aleš Hemský (A)	1.83 m (6 ft 0 in)	84 kg (185 lb)	August 13, 1983 (aged 33)	(United States) Dallas Stars
23	RW	Dmitri Jaškin	1.88 m (6 ft 2 in)	98 kg (216 lb)	March 23, 1993 (aged 23)	(United States) St. Louis Blues
9	LW	Milan Michálek	1.88 m (6 ft 2 in)	103 kg (227 lb)	December 7, 1984 (aged 31)	(Canada) Toronto Maple Leafs
18	LW	Ondřej Palát	1.80 m (5 ft 11 in)	79 kg (174 lb)	March 28, 1991 (aged 25)	(United States) Tampa Bay Lightning
88	RW	David Pastrňák	1.83 m (6 ft 0 in)	82 kg (181 lb)	May 25, 1996 (aged 20)	(United States) Boston Bruins
14	C	Tomáš Plekanec (C)	1.80 m (5 ft 11 in)	88 kg (194 lb)	October 31, 1982 (aged 33)	(Canada) Montreal Canadiens
17	RW	Vladimír Sobotka	1.78 m (5 ft 10 in)	83 kg (183 lb)	July 2, 1987 (aged 29)	(Russia) Avangard Omsk
93	RW	Jakub Voráček (A)	1.88 m (6 ft 2 in)	97 kg (214 lb)	August 15, 1989 (aged 27)	(United States) Philadelphia Flyers

David Krejčí, Tomáš Hertl, and Radko Gudas were originally selected, but could not participate, because of injury. They were replaced by Roman Červenka, Michal Birner, and Tomáš Kundrátek, respectively.

=== Team Europe ===
Head coach: Ralph Krueger

No.	Pos.	Name	Height	Weight	Birthdate	Team
1	G	(Germany) Thomas Greiss	1.85 m (6 ft 1 in)	103 kg (227 lb)	January 29, 1986 (aged 30)	(United States) New York Islanders
31	G	(Germany) Philipp Grubauer	1.85 m (6 ft 1 in)	83.5 kg (184 lb)	November 25, 1991 (aged 24)	(United States) Washington Capitals
41	G	(Slovakia) Jaroslav Halák	1.80 m (5 ft 11 in)	82 kg (181 lb)	May 13, 1985 (aged 31)	(United States) New York Islanders
33	D	(Slovakia) Zdeno Chára (A)	2.06 m (6 ft 9 in)	110 kg (240 lb)	March 18, 1977 (aged 39)	(United States) Boston Bruins
10	D	(Germany) Christian Ehrhoff	1.88 m (6 ft 2 in)	91 kg (201 lb)	July 6, 1982 (aged 34)	Free agent
59	D	(Switzerland) Roman Josi	1.88 m (6 ft 2 in)	88 kg (194 lb)	June 1, 1990 (aged 26)	(United States) Nashville Predators
5	D	(Switzerland) Luca Sbisa	1.88 m (6 ft 2 in)	90 kg (200 lb)	January 30, 1990 (aged 26)	(Canada) Vancouver Canucks
44	D	(Germany) Dennis Seidenberg	1.85 m (6 ft 1 in)	95 kg (209 lb)	July 18, 1981 (aged 35)	Free agent
2	D	(Slovakia) Andrej Sekera	1.83 m (6 ft 0 in)	91 kg (201 lb)	June 8, 1986 (aged 30)	(Canada) Edmonton Oilers
7	D	(Switzerland) Mark Streit (A)	1.80 m (5 ft 11 in)	93 kg (205 lb)	December 11, 1977 (aged 38)	(United States) Philadelphia Flyers
78	LW	(France) Pierre-Édouard Bellemare	1.83 m (6 ft 0 in)	90 kg (200 lb)	March 6, 1985 (aged 31)	(United States) Philadelphia Flyers
89	LW	(Denmark) Mikkel Bødker	1.80 m (5 ft 11 in)	91 kg (201 lb)	December 16, 1989 (aged 26)	(United States) San Jose Sharks
29	C	(Germany) Leon Draisaitl	1.85 m (6 ft 1 in)	97 kg (214 lb)	October 27, 1995 (aged 20)	(Canada) Edmonton Oilers
12	RW	(Slovakia) Marián Gáborík	1.85 m (6 ft 1 in)	93 kg (205 lb)	February 14, 1982 (aged 34)	(United States) Los Angeles Kings
36	RW	(Denmark) Jannik Hansen	1.85 m (6 ft 1 in)	88 kg (194 lb)	March 15, 1986 (aged 30)	(Canada) Vancouver Canucks
81	RW	(Slovakia) Marián Hossa	1.85 m (6 ft 1 in)	95 kg (209 lb)	January 12, 1979 (aged 37)	(United States) Chicago Blackhawks
11	C	(Slovenia) Anže Kopitar (C)	1.91 m (6 ft 3 in)	103 kg (227 lb)	August 24, 1987 (aged 29)	(United States) Los Angeles Kings
22	LW	(Switzerland) Nino Niederreiter	1.88 m (6 ft 2 in)	96 kg (212 lb)	September 8, 1992 (aged 24)	(United States) Minnesota Wild
51	C	(Denmark) Frans Nielsen	1.85 m (6 ft 1 in)	82 kg (181 lb)	April 24, 1984 (aged 32)	(United States) Detroit Red Wings
8	RW	(Germany) Tobias Rieder	1.80 m (5 ft 11 in)	84 kg (185 lb)	January 10, 1993 (aged 23)	(United States) Arizona Coyotes
21	LW	(Slovakia) Tomáš Tatar	1.78 m (5 ft 10 in)	80 kg (180 lb)	December 1, 1990 (aged 25)	(United States) Detroit Red Wings
26	LW	(Austria) Thomas Vanek	1.88 m (6 ft 2 in)	99 kg (218 lb)	January 19, 1984 (aged 32)	(United States) Detroit Red Wings
63	RW	(Norway) Mats Zuccarello	1.70 m (5 ft 7 in)	81 kg (179 lb)	September 1, 1987 (aged 29)	(United States) New York Rangers

Frederik Andersen was originally selected, but could not participate, because of injury. He was replaced by Philipp Grubauer.

=== United States ===
Head coach: John Tortorella

No.	Pos.	Name	Height	Weight	Birthdate	Team
30	G	Ben Bishop	2.01 m (6 ft 7 in)	98 kg (216 lb)	November 21, 1986 (aged 29)	(United States) Tampa Bay Lightning
32	G	Jonathan Quick	1.85 m (6 ft 1 in)	100 kg (220 lb)	January 21, 1986 (aged 30)	(United States) Los Angeles Kings
35	G	Cory Schneider	1.88 m (6 ft 2 in)	88 kg (194 lb)	March 18, 1986 (aged 30)	(United States) New Jersey Devils
33	D	Dustin Byfuglien	1.96 m (6 ft 5 in)	120 kg (260 lb)	March 27, 1985 (aged 31)	(Canada) Winnipeg Jets
4	D	John Carlson	1.91 m (6 ft 3 in)	99 kg (218 lb)	January 10, 1990 (aged 26)	(United States) Washington Capitals
6	D	Erik Johnson	1.93 m (6 ft 4 in)	105 kg (231 lb)	March 21, 1988 (aged 28)	(United States) Colorado Avalanche
3	D	Jack Johnson	1.85 m (6 ft 1 in)	104 kg (229 lb)	January 13, 1987 (aged 29)	(United States) Columbus Blue Jackets
27	D	Ryan McDonagh	1.85 m (6 ft 1 in)	97 kg (214 lb)	June 13, 1989 (aged 27)	(United States) New York Rangers
2	D	Matt Niskanen	1.83 m (6 ft 0 in)	91 kg (201 lb)	December 6, 1986 (aged 29)	(United States) Washington Capitals
20	D	Ryan Suter (A)	1.85 m (6 ft 1 in)	88 kg (194 lb)	January 21, 1985 (aged 31)	(United States) Minnesota Wild
89	LW	Justin Abdelkader	1.88 m (6 ft 2 in)	99 kg (218 lb)	February 25, 1987 (aged 29)	(United States) Detroit Red Wings
42	C	David Backes	1.91 m (6 ft 3 in)	101 kg (223 lb)	May 1, 1984 (aged 32)	(United States) Boston Bruins
19	C	Brandon Dubinsky	1.88 m (6 ft 2 in)	98 kg (216 lb)	April 29, 1986 (aged 30)	(United States) Columbus Blue Jackets
88	RW	Patrick Kane (A)	1.78 m (5 ft 10 in)	80 kg (180 lb)	November 19, 1988 (aged 27)	(United States) Chicago Blackhawks
17	C	Ryan Kesler	1.88 m (6 ft 2 in)	92 kg (203 lb)	August 31, 1984 (aged 32)	(United States) Anaheim Ducks
74	RW	T. J. Oshie	1.80 m (5 ft 11 in)	86 kg (190 lb)	December 23, 1986 (aged 29)	(United States) Washington Capitals
67	LW	Max Pacioretty	1.88 m (6 ft 2 in)	97 kg (214 lb)	November 20, 1988 (aged 27)	(Canada) Montreal Canadiens
23	RW	Kyle Palmieri	1.79 m (5 ft 10 in)	88 kg (194 lb)	February 1, 1991 (aged 25)	(United States) New Jersey Devils
9	LW	Zach Parise	1.80 m (5 ft 11 in)	89 kg (196 lb)	July 28, 1984 (aged 32)	(United States) Minnesota Wild
8	C	Joe Pavelski (C)	1.80 m (5 ft 11 in)	88 kg (194 lb)	July 11, 1984 (aged 32)	(United States) San Jose Sharks
21	C	Derek Stepan	1.83 m (6 ft 0 in)	89 kg (196 lb)	June 18, 1990 (aged 26)	(United States) New York Rangers
16	LW	James van Riemsdyk	1.91 m (6 ft 3 in)	95 kg (209 lb)	May 4, 1989 (aged 27)	(Canada) Toronto Maple Leafs
26	RW	Blake Wheeler	1.96 m (6 ft 5 in)	93 kg (205 lb)	August 31, 1986 (aged 30)	(Canada) Winnipeg Jets

Ryan Callahan was originally selected, but could not participate, because of injury. He was replaced by Kyle Palmieri.

== Group B ==
=== Finland ===
Head coach: Lauri Marjamäki

No.	Pos.	Name	Height	Weight	Birthdate	Team
19	G	Mikko Koskinen	2.00 m (6 ft 7 in)	95 kg (209 lb)	July 18, 1988 (aged 28)	(Russia) SKA Saint Petersburg
40	G	Tuukka Rask	1.88 m (6 ft 2 in)	84 kg (185 lb)	March 10, 1987 (aged 29)	(United States) Boston Bruins
35	G	Pekka Rinne	1.96 m (6 ft 5 in)	98 kg (216 lb)	November 3, 1982 (aged 33)	(United States) Nashville Predators
2	D	Jyrki Jokipakka	1.91 m (6 ft 3 in)	98 kg (216 lb)	August 20, 1991 (aged 25)	(Canada) Calgary Flames
18	D	Sami Lepistö	1.85 m (6 ft 1 in)	86 kg (190 lb)	October 17, 1984 (aged 31)	(Russia) Salavat Yulaev Ufa
7	D	Esa Lindell	1.91 m (6 ft 3 in)	98 kg (216 lb)	May 23, 1994 (aged 22)	(United States) Dallas Stars
3	D	Olli Määttä	1.88 m (6 ft 2 in)	93 kg (205 lb)	August 22, 1994 (aged 22)	(United States) Pittsburgh Penguins
22	D	Ville Pokka	1.83 m (6 ft 0 in)	97 kg (214 lb)	June 3, 1994 (aged 22)	(United States) Chicago Blackhawks
55	D	Rasmus Ristolainen	1.93 m (6 ft 4 in)	99 kg (218 lb)	October 27, 1994 (aged 21)	(United States) Buffalo Sabres
45	D	Sami Vatanen	1.79 m (5 ft 10 in)	80 kg (180 lb)	June 3, 1991 (aged 25)	(United States) Anaheim Ducks
20	LW	Sebastian Aho	1.81 m (5 ft 11 in)	78 kg (172 lb)	July 26, 1997 (aged 19)	(United States) Carolina Hurricanes
91	C	Aleksander Barkov	1.91 m (6 ft 3 in)	96 kg (212 lb)	September 2, 1995 (aged 21)	(United States) Florida Panthers
27	LW	Joonas Donskoi	1.83 m (6 ft 0 in)	84 kg (185 lb)	April 13, 1992 (aged 24)	(United States) San Jose Sharks
51	C	Valtteri Filppula (A)	1.83 m (6 ft 0 in)	88 kg (194 lb)	March 20, 1984 (aged 32)	(United States) Tampa Bay Lightning
64	LW	Mikael Granlund	1.78 m (5 ft 10 in)	84 kg (185 lb)	February 26, 1992 (aged 24)	(United States) Minnesota Wild
56	RW	Erik Haula	1.82 m (6 ft 0 in)	88 kg (194 lb)	March 23, 1991 (aged 25)	(United States) Minnesota Wild
36	LW	Jussi Jokinen (A)	1.83 m (6 ft 0 in)	87 kg (192 lb)	April 1, 1983 (aged 33)	(United States) Florida Panthers
9	C	Mikko Koivu (C)	1.91 m (6 ft 3 in)	101 kg (223 lb)	March 12, 1983 (aged 33)	(United States) Minnesota Wild
71	RW	Leo Komarov	1.80 m (5 ft 11 in)	90 kg (200 lb)	January 23, 1987 (aged 29)	(Canada) Toronto Maple Leafs
28	LW	Lauri Korpikoski	1.85 m (6 ft 1 in)	93 kg (205 lb)	July 28, 1986 (aged 30)	Free agent
29	RW	Patrik Laine	1.94 m (6 ft 4 in)	95 kg (209 lb)	April 19, 1998 (aged 18)	(Canada) Winnipeg Jets
12	C	Jori Lehterä	1.88 m (6 ft 2 in)	96 kg (212 lb)	December 23, 1987 (aged 28)	(United States) St. Louis Blues
86	C	Teuvo Teräväinen	1.80 m (5 ft 11 in)	81 kg (179 lb)	September 11, 1994 (aged 22)	(United States) Carolina Hurricanes

=== Team North America ===
Head coach: Todd McLellan

No.	Pos.	Name	Height	Weight	Birthdate	Team
36	G	(United States) John Gibson	1.91 m (6 ft 3 in)	91 kg (201 lb)	July 14, 1993 (aged 23)	(United States) Anaheim Ducks
37	G	(United States) Connor Hellebuyck	1.93 m (6 ft 4 in)	94 kg (207 lb)	May 19, 1993 (aged 23)	(Canada) Winnipeg Jets
30	G	(Canada) Matt Murray	1.93 m (6 ft 4 in)	81 kg (179 lb)	May 25, 1994 (aged 22)	(United States) Pittsburgh Penguins
5	D	(Canada) Aaron Ekblad (A)	1.93 m (6 ft 4 in)	98 kg (216 lb)	February 7, 1996 (aged 20)	(United States) Florida Panthers
53	D	(United States) Shayne Gostisbehere	1.80 m (5 ft 11 in)	82 kg (181 lb)	April 20, 1993 (aged 23)	(United States) Philadelphia Flyers
3	D	(United States) Seth Jones	1.93 m (6 ft 4 in)	93 kg (205 lb)	October 3, 1994 (aged 21)	(United States) Columbus Blue Jackets
27	D	(Canada) Ryan Murray	1.83 m (6 ft 0 in)	90 kg (200 lb)	September 27, 1993 (aged 22)	(United States) Columbus Blue Jackets
4	D	(Canada) Colton Parayko	1.98 m (6 ft 6 in)	103 kg (227 lb)	May 12, 1993 (aged 23)	(United States) St. Louis Blues
44	D	(Canada) Morgan Rielly	1.85 m (6 ft 1 in)	82 kg (181 lb)	March 9, 1994 (aged 22)	(Canada) Toronto Maple Leafs
8	D	(United States) Jacob Trouba	1.88 m (6 ft 2 in)	85 kg (187 lb)	February 26, 1994 (aged 22)	(Canada) Winnipeg Jets
14	C	(Canada) Sean Couturier (A)	1.91 m (6 ft 3 in)	89 kg (196 lb)	December 7, 1992 (aged 23)	(United States) Philadelphia Flyers
72	C	(Canada) Jonathan Drouin	1.80 m (5 ft 11 in)	85 kg (187 lb)	March 28, 1995 (aged 21)	(United States) Tampa Bay Lightning
15	C	(United States) Jack Eichel	1.88 m (6 ft 2 in)	91 kg (201 lb)	October 28, 1996 (aged 19)	(United States) Buffalo Sabres
13	LW	(United States) Johnny Gaudreau	1.75 m (5 ft 9 in)	68 kg (150 lb)	August 13, 1993 (aged 23)	(Canada) Calgary Flames
71	C	(United States) Dylan Larkin	1.85 m (6 ft 1 in)	86 kg (190 lb)	July 30, 1996 (aged 20)	(United States) Detroit Red Wings
29	C	(Canada) Nathan MacKinnon	1.83 m (6 ft 0 in)	85 kg (187 lb)	September 1, 1995 (aged 21)	(United States) Colorado Avalanche
34	C	(United States) Auston Matthews	1.88 m (6 ft 2 in)	89 kg (196 lb)	September 17, 1997 (aged 19)	(Canada) Toronto Maple Leafs
97	C	(Canada) Connor McDavid (C)	1.85 m (6 ft 1 in)	88 kg (194 lb)	January 13, 1997 (aged 19)	(Canada) Edmonton Oilers
10	LW	(United States) J. T. Miller	1.85 m (6 ft 1 in)	91 kg (201 lb)	March 14, 1993 (aged 23)	(United States) New York Rangers
93	C	(Canada) Ryan Nugent-Hopkins	1.83 m (6 ft 0 in)	86 kg (190 lb)	April 12, 1993 (aged 23)	(Canada) Edmonton Oilers
20	LW	(United States) Brandon Saad	1.85 m (6 ft 1 in)	92 kg (203 lb)	October 27, 1992 (aged 23)	(United States) Columbus Blue Jackets
55	C	(Canada) Mark Scheifele	1.91 m (6 ft 3 in)	94 kg (207 lb)	March 15, 1993 (aged 23)	(Canada) Winnipeg Jets
21	C	(United States) Vincent Trocheck	1.78 m (5 ft 10 in)	83 kg (183 lb)	July 11, 1993 (aged 23)	(United States) Florida Panthers

Sean Monahan was originally selected, but could not participate due to a back strain. He was replaced by Trocheck as a result.

=== Russia ===
Head coach: Oleg Znarok

No.	Pos.	Name	Height	Weight	Birthdate	Team
72	G	Sergei Bobrovsky	1.88 m (6 ft 2 in)	86 kg (190 lb)	September 20, 1988 (aged 27)	(United States) Columbus Blue Jackets
1	G	Semyon Varlamov	1.88 m (6 ft 2 in)	95 kg (209 lb)	April 27, 1988 (aged 28)	(United States) Colorado Avalanche
88	G	Andrei Vasilevskiy	1.91 m (6 ft 3 in)	93 kg (205 lb)	July 25, 1994 (aged 22)	(United States) Tampa Bay Lightning
74	D	Alexei Emelin	1.88 m (6 ft 2 in)	98 kg (216 lb)	April 25, 1986 (aged 30)	(Canada) Montreal Canadiens
7	D	Dmitri Kulikov	1.85 m (6 ft 1 in)	84 kg (185 lb)	October 29, 1990 (aged 25)	(United States) Buffalo Sabres
47	D	Alexei Marchenko	1.91 m (6 ft 3 in)	95 kg (209 lb)	January 2, 1992 (aged 24)	(United States) Detroit Red Wings
79	D	Andrei Markov	1.83 m (6 ft 0 in)	88 kg (194 lb)	December 20, 1978 (aged 37)	(Canada) Montreal Canadiens
89	D	Nikita Nesterov	1.81 m (5 ft 11 in)	83 kg (183 lb)	March 28, 1993 (aged 23)	(United States) Tampa Bay Lightning
9	D	Dmitry Orlov	1.83 m (6 ft 0 in)	91 kg (201 lb)	July 23, 1991 (aged 25)	(United States) Washington Capitals
22	D	Nikita Zaitsev	1.89 m (6 ft 2 in)	89 kg (196 lb)	October 29, 1991 (aged 24)	(Canada) Toronto Maple Leafs
42	C	Artem Anisimov	1.93 m (6 ft 4 in)	90 kg (200 lb)	May 24, 1988 (aged 28)	(United States) Chicago Blackhawks
63	RW	Evgenii Dadonov	1.79 m (5 ft 10 in)	84 kg (185 lb)	March 12, 1989 (aged 27)	(Russia) SKA Saint Petersburg
13	C	Pavel Datsyuk (A)	1.80 m (5 ft 11 in)	83 kg (183 lb)	July 20, 1978 (aged 38)	(Russia) SKA Saint Petersburg
86	RW	Nikita Kucherov	1.80 m (5 ft 11 in)	81 kg (179 lb)	June 17, 1993 (aged 23)	(United States) Tampa Bay Lightning
41	RW	Nikolay Kulemin	1.85 m (6 ft 1 in)	96 kg (212 lb)	July 14, 1986 (aged 30)	(United States) New York Islanders
92	C	Evgeny Kuznetsov	1.83 m (6 ft 0 in)	86 kg (190 lb)	May 19, 1992 (aged 24)	(United States) Washington Capitals
71	C	Evgeni Malkin (A)	1.91 m (6 ft 3 in)	88 kg (194 lb)	July 31, 1986 (aged 30)	(United States) Pittsburgh Penguins
90	C	Vladislav Namestnikov	1.80 m (5 ft 11 in)	77 kg (170 lb)	November 22, 1992 (aged 23)	(United States) Tampa Bay Lightning
8	LW	Alexander Ovechkin (C)	1.91 m (6 ft 3 in)	108 kg (238 lb)	September 17, 1985 (aged 31)	(United States) Washington Capitals
27	LW	Artemi Panarin	1.80 m (5 ft 11 in)	77 kg (170 lb)	October 30, 1991 (aged 24)	(United States) Chicago Blackhawks
87	C	Vadim Shipachyov	1.83 m (6 ft 0 in)	85 kg (187 lb)	March 12, 1987 (aged 29)	(Russia) SKA Saint Petersburg
91	RW	Vladimir Tarasenko	1.83 m (6 ft 0 in)	99 kg (218 lb)	December 13, 1991 (aged 24)	(United States) St. Louis Blues
77	C	Ivan Telegin	1.93 m (6 ft 4 in)	92 kg (203 lb)	February 28, 1992 (aged 24)	(Russia) CSKA Moscow

Slava Voynov was originally selected but was not allowed to participate. He was ruled ineligible because of his indefinite suspension from the NHL during the 2014–15 season. He was replaced by Nikita Nesterov.

=== Sweden ===
Head coach: Rikard Grönborg

No.	Pos.	Name	Height	Weight	Birthdate	Team
1	G	Jhonas Enroth	1.80 m (5 ft 11 in)	75 kg (165 lb)	June 25, 1988 (aged 28)	(Canada) Toronto Maple Leafs
30	G	Henrik Lundqvist	1.85 m (6 ft 1 in)	85 kg (187 lb)	March 2, 1982 (aged 34)	(United States) New York Rangers
25	G	Jacob Markström	1.98 m (6 ft 6 in)	89 kg (196 lb)	January 31, 1990 (aged 26)	(Canada) Vancouver Canucks
14	D	Mattias Ekholm	1.93 m (6 ft 4 in)	98 kg (216 lb)	May 24, 1990 (aged 26)	(United States) Nashville Predators
23	D	Oliver Ekman-Larsson	1.88 m (6 ft 2 in)	91 kg (201 lb)	July 17, 1991 (aged 25)	(United States) Arizona Coyotes
77	D	Victor Hedman	1.98 m (6 ft 6 in)	105 kg (231 lb)	December 18, 1990 (aged 25)	(United States) Tampa Bay Lightning
4	D	Niklas Hjalmarsson	1.91 m (6 ft 3 in)	93 kg (205 lb)	June 6, 1987 (aged 29)	(United States) Chicago Blackhawks
65	D	Erik Karlsson (A)	1.83 m (6 ft 0 in)	82 kg (181 lb)	May 31, 1990 (aged 26)	(Canada) Ottawa Senators
47	D	Hampus Lindholm	1.88 m (6 ft 2 in)	88 kg (194 lb)	January 20, 1994 (aged 22)	(United States) Anaheim Ducks
6	D	Anton Strålman	1.85 m (6 ft 1 in)	82 kg (181 lb)	August 1, 1986 (aged 30)	(United States) Tampa Bay Lightning
11	C	Mikael Backlund	1.83 m (6 ft 0 in)	89.8 kg (198 lb)	March 17, 1987 (aged 29)	(Canada) Calgary Flames
17	C	Patrik Berglund	1.93 m (6 ft 4 in)	99.3 kg (219 lb)	June 2, 1988 (aged 28)	(United States) St. Louis Blues
19	C	Nicklas Bäckström	1.88 m (6 ft 2 in)	97 kg (214 lb)	November 23, 1987 (aged 28)	(United States) Washington Capitals
21	LW	Loui Eriksson	1.88 m (6 ft 2 in)	89 kg (196 lb)	July 17, 1985 (aged 31)	(Canada) Vancouver Canucks
9	LW	Filip Forsberg	1.88 m (6 ft 2 in)	94 kg (207 lb)	August 13, 1994 (aged 22)	(United States) Nashville Predators
62	LW	Carl Hagelin	1.80 m (5 ft 11 in)	84 kg (185 lb)	August 23, 1988 (aged 28)	(United States) Pittsburgh Penguins
72	RW	Patric Hörnqvist	1.80 m (5 ft 11 in)	86 kg (190 lb)	January 1, 1987 (aged 29)	(United States) Pittsburgh Penguins
16	C	Marcus Krüger	1.83 m (6 ft 0 in)	84 kg (185 lb)	May 27, 1990 (aged 26)	(United States) Chicago Blackhawks
92	LW	Gabriel Landeskog	1.85 m (6 ft 1 in)	93 kg (205 lb)	November 23, 1992 (aged 23)	(United States) Colorado Avalanche
22	LW	Daniel Sedin (A)	1.85 m (6 ft 1 in)	85 kg (187 lb)	September 26, 1980 (aged 35)	(Canada) Vancouver Canucks
33	C	Henrik Sedin (C)	1.88 m (6 ft 2 in)	85 kg (187 lb)	September 26, 1980 (aged 35)	(Canada) Vancouver Canucks
18	RW	Jakob Silfverberg	1.88 m (6 ft 2 in)	89 kg (196 lb)	October 13, 1990 (aged 25)	(United States) Anaheim Ducks
34	C	Carl Söderberg	1.91 m (6 ft 3 in)	98 kg (216 lb)	October 12, 1985 (aged 30)	(United States) Colorado Avalanche

Robin Lehner, Niklas Kronwall, Alexander Steen, and Henrik Zetterberg were originally selected, but could not participate, because of injury. They were replaced by Jhonas Enroth, Hampus Lindholm, Rickard Rakell, and Mikael Backlund, respectively. Later, when Rakell himself pulled out, he was replaced by Patrik Berglund. Henrik Zetterberg was originally selected captain, but was replaced by Henrik Sedin when Zetterberg pulled out of the tournament.
