= Team Europe (ice hockey) =

Multinational ice hockey team

Europe
- General manager: (Slovakia) Miroslav Šatan
- Head coach: (Germany) Ralph Krueger
- Assistants: (Canada) Paul Maurice and Brad Shaw
- Captain: (Slovenia) Anže Kopitar
- Top scorer: (Slovakia) Tomáš Tatar (3)
- Most points: (Slovenia) Anže Kopitar (Norway) Mats Zuccarello (4)
- Team colors
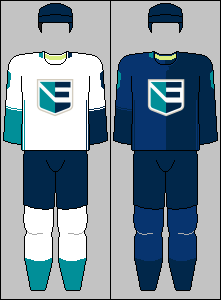

First international
- North America 4–0 Europe (Quebec City, Quebec, Canada; 8 September 2016)

Biggest win
- Europe 6–2 Sweden (Washington, D.C., United States; 14 September 2016)

Biggest defeat
- North America 4–0 Europe (Quebec City, Quebec, Canada; 8 September 2016)

World Cup of Hockey
- Appearances: 1 (first in 2016)
- Best result: 2nd: (2016)

International record (W–L–T)
- 4–5–0

Team Europe was an international ice hockey team created for the 2016 World Cup of Hockey. It was jointly administered by the IIHF and NHL and represented countries in Europe not represented by their own national team, including Austria, Denmark, France, Germany, Norway, Slovakia, Slovenia, and Switzerland. Team Europe players wore badges with their respective nations' flags on their jerseys.

== 2016 World Cup of Hockey ==
Team Europe played its first pre-tournament game on September 8, 2016. They were defeated 4–0 by Team North America at the Videotron Centre, in Quebec City.

The team played 3 group stage games; a 3–0 shutout win over the United States, a 3–2 overtime win against Czech Republic, and a 4–1 defeat to Canada. Team Europe finished second in the group behind Canada and advanced to the knockout stage.

Europe faced Sweden in the semi-final where they would win 3–2 in overtime on a goal by Tomáš Tatar. In the best-of-three final against Canada, Europe was defeated, losing 3–1 and 2–1 in two games.

Team Europe finished the tournament as runners-up with a 3–3–0 record overall, scoring 11 goals and conceding 14 in six games.

== Team ==
=== Roster ===
Roster for the 2016 World Cup of Hockey.

Head coach: Ralph Krueger

No.	Pos.	Name	Height	Weight	Birthdate	Team
1	G	(Germany) Thomas Greiss	1.85 m (6 ft 1 in)	103 kg (227 lb)	29 January 1986 (aged 30)	(United States) New York Islanders
31	G	(Germany) Philipp Grubauer	1.85 m (6 ft 1 in)	83.5 kg (184 lb)	25 November 1991 (aged 24)	(United States) Washington Capitals
41	G	(Slovakia) Jaroslav Halák	1.80 m (5 ft 11 in)	82 kg (181 lb)	13 May 1985 (aged 31)	(United States) New York Islanders
33	D	(Slovakia) Zdeno Chára (A)	2.06 m (6 ft 9 in)	110 kg (240 lb)	18 March 1977 (aged 39)	(United States) Boston Bruins
10	D	(Germany) Christian Ehrhoff	1.88 m (6 ft 2 in)	91 kg (201 lb)	6 July 1982 (aged 34)	Free Agent
59	D	(Switzerland) Roman Josi	1.88 m (6 ft 2 in)	88 kg (194 lb)	1 June 1990 (aged 26)	(United States) Nashville Predators
5	D	(Switzerland) Luca Sbisa	1.88 m (6 ft 2 in)	90 kg (200 lb)	30 January 1990 (aged 26)	(Canada) Vancouver Canucks
44	D	(Germany) Dennis Seidenberg	1.85 m (6 ft 1 in)	95 kg (209 lb)	18 July 1981 (aged 35)	(United States) New York Islanders
2	D	(Slovakia) Andrej Sekera	1.83 m (6 ft 0 in)	91 kg (201 lb)	8 June 1986 (aged 30)	(Canada) Edmonton Oilers
7	D	(Switzerland) Mark Streit (A)	1.80 m (5 ft 11 in)	93 kg (205 lb)	11 December 1977 (aged 38)	(United States) Philadelphia Flyers
78	LW	(France) Pierre-Édouard Bellemare	1.83 m (6 ft 0 in)	90 kg (200 lb)	6 March 1985 (aged 31)	(United States) Philadelphia Flyers
89	LW	(Denmark) Mikkel Bødker	1.80 m (5 ft 11 in)	91 kg (201 lb)	16 December 1989 (aged 26)	(United States) San Jose Sharks
29	C	(Germany) Leon Draisaitl	1.85 m (6 ft 1 in)	97 kg (214 lb)	27 October 1995 (aged 20)	(Canada) Edmonton Oilers
12	RW	(Slovakia) Marián Gáborík	1.85 m (6 ft 1 in)	93 kg (205 lb)	14 February 1982 (aged 34)	(United States) Los Angeles Kings
36	RW	(Denmark) Jannik Hansen	1.85 m (6 ft 1 in)	88 kg (194 lb)	15 March 1986 (aged 30)	(Canada) Vancouver Canucks
81	RW	(Slovakia) Marián Hossa	1.85 m (6 ft 1 in)	95 kg (209 lb)	12 January 1979 (aged 37)	(United States) Chicago Blackhawks
11	C	(Slovenia) Anže Kopitar (C)	1.91 m (6 ft 3 in)	103 kg (227 lb)	24 August 1987 (aged 29)	(United States) Los Angeles Kings
22	LW	(Switzerland) Nino Niederreiter	1.88 m (6 ft 2 in)	96 kg (212 lb)	8 September 1992 (aged 24)	(United States) Minnesota Wild
51	C	(Denmark) Frans Nielsen	1.85 m (6 ft 1 in)	82 kg (181 lb)	24 April 1984 (aged 32)	(United States) Detroit Red Wings
8	RW	(Germany) Tobias Rieder	1.80 m (5 ft 11 in)	84 kg (185 lb)	10 January 1993 (aged 23)	(United States) Arizona Coyotes
21	LW	(Slovakia) Tomáš Tatar	1.78 m (5 ft 10 in)	80 kg (180 lb)	1 December 1990 (aged 25)	(United States) Detroit Red Wings
26	LW	(Austria) Thomas Vanek	1.88 m (6 ft 2 in)	99 kg (218 lb)	19 January 1984 (aged 32)	(United States) Detroit Red Wings
63	RW	(Norway) Mats Zuccarello	1.70 m (5 ft 7 in)	81 kg (179 lb)	1 September 1987 (aged 29)	(United States) New York Rangers

Source: National Hockey League's official website

Frederik Andersen was originally selected but could not participate due to injury. He was replaced by Philipp Grubauer.

== All-time record against nations ==
Team	GP	W	L	OTL	GF	GA
Canada	3	0	3	0	3	9
Czech Republic	1	1	0	0	3	2
North America	2	0	2	0	4	11
Sweden	2	2	0	0	9	4
United States	1	1	0	0	3	0

== See also ==
- Team Europe
