= Team North America =

Ice hockey team

North America
- Nickname: "The Young Guns"
- General manager: (Canada) Stan Bowman (Canada) Peter Chiarelli
- Head coach: (Canada) Todd McLellan
- Assistants: (Canada) Jon Cooper (Canada) Peter DeBoer (Canada) Dave Tippett (Canada) Jay Woodcroft
- Captain: (Canada) Connor McDavid
- Most points: (United States) Gaudreau (United States) Gostisbehere (4)
- Team colors
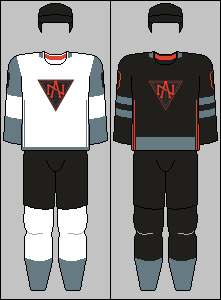

First international
- North America 4–0 Europe (Quebec City, Quebec, Canada; 8 September 2016)

Biggest win
- North America 4–0 Europe (Quebec City, Quebec, Canada; 8 September 2016)

Biggest defeat
- Czech Republic 3–2 North America (Pittsburgh, PA, United States; 14 September 2016); Russia 4–3 North America (Toronto, Ontario, Canada; 19 September 2016)

International record (W–L–T)
- 4–2–0

Team North America was a hockey team created for the 2016 World Cup of Hockey. It represented players aged 23-and-under from Canada and the United States.

== 2016 World Cup of Hockey ==
Team North America played its first pre-tournament game on September 8, 2016. They defeated Team Europe 4–0 at the Videotron Centre, in Quebec City. They then played 2 more pre-tournament games, defeating Team Europe 7–4, and conceding to Czech Republic 3–2.

The team played only 3 official tournament games; a 4–1 win over Finland, a 4–3 loss against Russia, and a 4–3 overtime win against Sweden. Despite finishing in a tie with Russia for the final spot in the knockout round, Team North America did not advance as their head-to-head loss to Russia broke the tie.

Team North America finished the tournament in 5th place with a record of 2–1–0. They scored 11 goals and allowed 8 for a +3 differential.

== All-time record against other nations ==
Team	GP	W	L	OTL	GF	GA
Czech Republic	1	0	1	0	2	3
Europe	2	2	0	0	11	4
Finland	1	1	0	0	4	1
Russia	1	0	1	0	3	4
Sweden	1	1	0	0	4	3

== Roster ==
Head coach: Todd McLellan

No.	Pos.	Name	Height	Weight	Birthdate	Team
36	G	(United States) John Gibson	1.91 m (6 ft 3 in)	91 kg (201 lb)	July 14, 1993 (aged 23)	(United States) Anaheim Ducks
37	G	(United States) Connor Hellebuyck	1.93 m (6 ft 4 in)	94 kg (207 lb)	May 19, 1993 (aged 23)	(Canada) Winnipeg Jets
30	G	(Canada) Matt Murray	1.93 m (6 ft 4 in)	81 kg (179 lb)	May 25, 1994 (aged 22)	(United States) Pittsburgh Penguins
5	D	(Canada) Aaron Ekblad (A)	1.93 m (6 ft 4 in)	98 kg (216 lb)	February 7, 1996 (aged 20)	(United States) Florida Panthers
53	D	(United States) Shayne Gostisbehere	1.80 m (5 ft 11 in)	82 kg (181 lb)	April 20, 1993 (aged 23)	(United States) Philadelphia Flyers
3	D	(United States) Seth Jones	1.93 m (6 ft 4 in)	93 kg (205 lb)	October 3, 1994 (aged 21)	(United States) Columbus Blue Jackets
27	D	(Canada) Ryan Murray	1.83 m (6 ft 0 in)	90 kg (200 lb)	September 27, 1993 (aged 22)	(United States) Columbus Blue Jackets
4	D	(Canada) Colton Parayko	1.98 m (6 ft 6 in)	103 kg (227 lb)	May 12, 1993 (aged 23)	(United States) St. Louis Blues
44	D	(Canada) Morgan Rielly	1.85 m (6 ft 1 in)	97.5 kg (215 lb)	March 9, 1994 (aged 22)	(Canada) Toronto Maple Leafs
8	D	(United States) Jacob Trouba	1.88 m (6 ft 2 in)	85 kg (187 lb)	February 26, 1994 (aged 22)	(Canada) Winnipeg Jets
14	C	(Canada) Sean Couturier (A)	1.91 m (6 ft 3 in)	89 kg (196 lb)	December 7, 1992 (aged 23)	(United States) Philadelphia Flyers
72	RW	(Canada) Jonathan Drouin	1.80 m (5 ft 11 in)	85 kg (187 lb)	March 28, 1995 (aged 21)	(United States) Tampa Bay Lightning
15	C	(United States) Jack Eichel	1.88 m (6 ft 2 in)	91 kg (201 lb)	October 28, 1996 (aged 19)	(United States) Buffalo Sabres
13	LW	(United States) Johnny Gaudreau	1.75 m (5 ft 9 in)	68 kg (150 lb)	August 13, 1993 (aged 23)	(Canada) Calgary Flames
71	RW	(United States) Dylan Larkin	1.85 m (6 ft 1 in)	86 kg (190 lb)	July 30, 1996 (aged 20)	(United States) Detroit Red Wings
29	RW	(Canada) Nathan MacKinnon	1.83 m (6 ft 0 in)	85 kg (187 lb)	September 1, 1995 (aged 21)	(United States) Colorado Avalanche
34	C	(United States) Auston Matthews	1.88 m (6 ft 2 in)	89 kg (196 lb)	September 17, 1997 (aged 19)	(Canada) Toronto Maple Leafs
97	C	(Canada) Connor McDavid (C)	1.85 m (6 ft 1 in)	88 kg (194 lb)	January 13, 1997 (aged 19)	(Canada) Edmonton Oilers
10	LW	(United States) J. T. Miller	1.85 m (6 ft 1 in)	91 kg (201 lb)	March 14, 1993 (aged 23)	(United States) New York Rangers
93	C	(Canada) Ryan Nugent-Hopkins	1.83 m (6 ft 0 in)	86 kg (190 lb)	April 12, 1993 (aged 23)	(Canada) Edmonton Oilers
20	LW	(United States) Brandon Saad	1.85 m (6 ft 1 in)	92 kg (203 lb)	October 27, 1992 (aged 23)	(United States) Columbus Blue Jackets
55	C	(Canada) Mark Scheifele	1.91 m (6 ft 3 in)	94 kg (207 lb)	March 15, 1993 (aged 23)	(Canada) Winnipeg Jets
21	C	(United States) Vincent Trocheck	1.78 m (5 ft 10 in)	83 kg (183 lb)	July 11, 1993 (aged 23)	(United States) Florida Panthers

Sean Monahan was originally selected but could not participate due to injury. He was replaced by Vincent Trocheck.

== See also ==
- Team North America
- Team Europe
