= Andrej Sekera =

Slovak ice hockey player (born 1986)

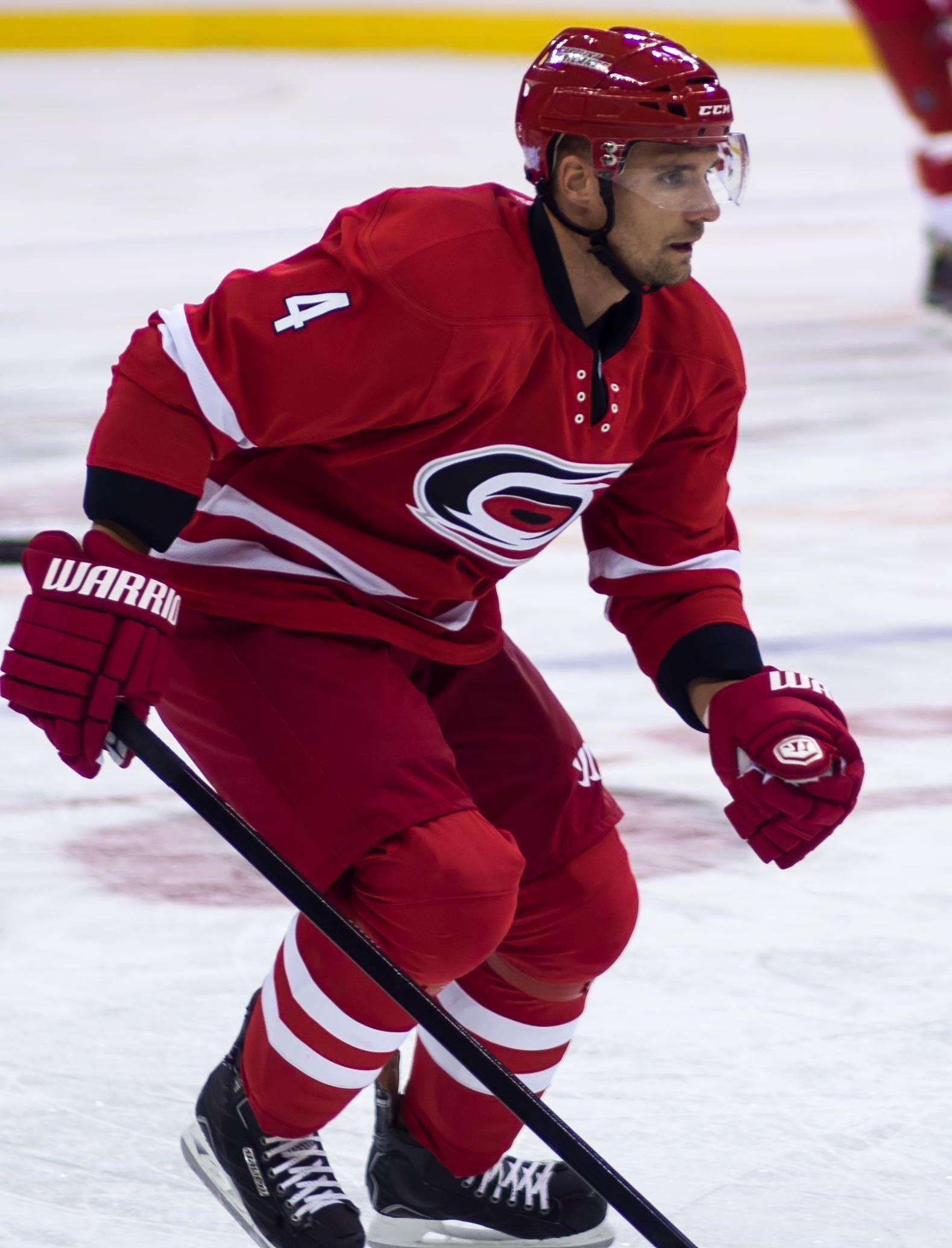
- Sekera with the Carolina Hurricanes in 2013
- Born: 8 June 1986 (age 40) Bojnice, Czechoslovakia
- Height: 6 ft 0 in (183 cm)
- Weight: 204 lb (93 kg; 14 st 8 lb)
- Position: Defence
- Shot: Left
- Played for: HK Dukla Trencin; Buffalo Sabres; Slovan Bratislava; Carolina Hurricanes; Los Angeles Kings; Edmonton Oilers; Dallas Stars
- National team: Slovakia
- NHL draft: 71st overall, 2004; Buffalo Sabres
- Playing career: 2006–2022

Andrej Sekera (born 8 June 1986) is a Slovak former professional ice hockey defenceman. He played for the Buffalo Sabres, Carolina Hurricanes, Los Angeles Kings, Edmonton Oilers and Dallas Stars of the National Hockey League (NHL).

Born and raised in Slovakia, Sekera played in the Slovak Extraliga for Dukla Trenčín before moving to North America to play with the Owen Sound Attack of the Ontario Hockey League (OHL). During his first season in the OHL, Sekra finished the regular season with 28 points in 51 games to rank seventh on the team in scoring. The following year, Sekra won the Max Kaminsky Trophy as the OHL's most outstanding defenceman. As a result of his outstanding junior play, he was drafted in the third round, 71st overall, by the Buffalo Sabres in the 2004 NHL entry draft.

Sekera spent seven seasons with the Sabres before he was traded to the Carolina Hurricanes in 2013. In his one and a half seasons with the team, Sekera broke out offensively and recorded career-highs in goals, assists, and points. His tenure ended when he was traded to the Los Angeles Kings to finish out the 2014–15 season. He remained with the Kings for the remainder of the season before signing with the Edmonton Oilers in 2015.

== Early life ==
Sekera was born on 8 June 1986, in Bojnice, Slovakia where he began playing ice hockey with neighborhood friends. As a teenager, he played two full seasons with the Trencin Jr. team, and three games in the Slovak Extraliga for Dukla Trenčín.

== Playing career ==
=== Minor ===
As a result of his hometown play, Sekera was drafted second overall by the Owen Sound Attack of the Ontario Hockey League (OHL) in the 2004 Import Draft. A few days later, Sekera was drafted 71st overall by the Buffalo Sabres of the National Hockey League (NHL) in the 2004 NHL entry draft. During his first season in the OHL, Sekra finished the regular season with 28 points in 51 games to rank seventh on the team in scoring. The following year, Sekra won the Max Kaminsky Trophy as the OHL's most outstanding defenceman.

=== Professional ===
==== Buffalo Sabres ====
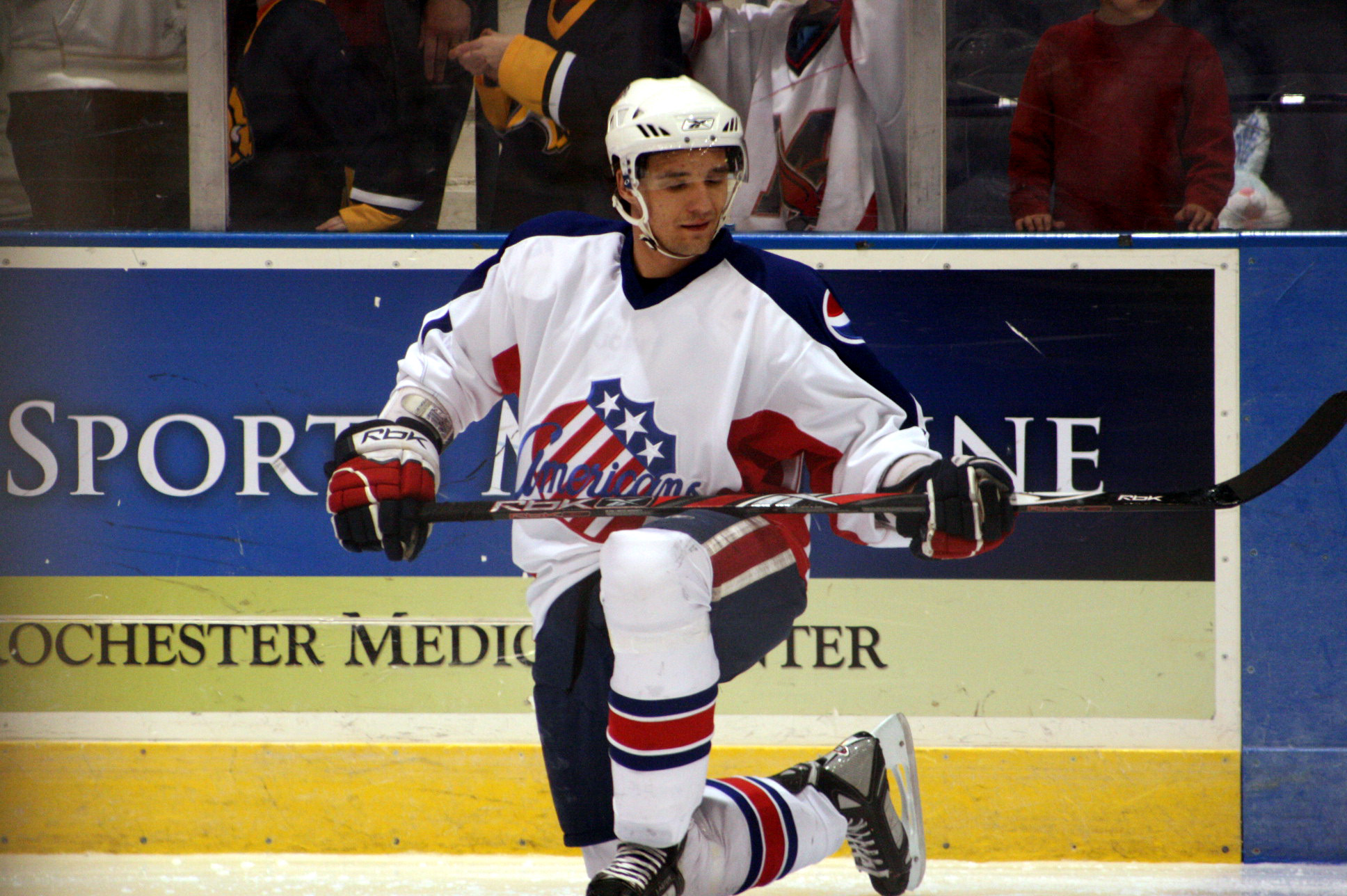
Sekera with the Rochester Americans in 2008

Following the 2005–06 OHL season, Sekera signed a three-year entry-level contract with the Buffalo Sabres on 14 July 2006. As such, he participated in the Sabres' pre-season games and recorded two penalty minutes and nine shots on goal through four contests. He was subsequently assigned to the Sabres' American Hockey League (AHL) affiliate, the Rochester Americans, to begin the 2006–07 season. Sekera was limited to 11 games with the Americans due to an injury but earned his first NHL callup on 24 November. He made his NHL debut that night in a 2–1 overtime loss to the Montreal Canadiens. He was returned to the AHL and finished the season with 17 points through 40 games. Sekera also spoke highly of his AHL experience, saying it helped him adjust his game to the professional level.

Sekera returned to the Sabres organization for the 2007–08 season but was again re-assigned to the Rochester Americans. However, following an injury to Jaroslav Spacek, he earned a recall to the NHL a few weeks later. During this time, he recorded his first career NHL goal on 28 November against St. Louis Blues' goaltender Manny Legace in a 4–3 loss. In December, Sabres' coach Lindy Ruff announced that Sekera would remain on the NHL roster following further injuries to Dmitri Kalinin and Henrik Tallinder. As a result of the Sabres' numerous injuries, Sekera's ice time increased and he averaged 17:17 minutes of ice time. As the team recovered, he was returned to the AHL but called up again in March. During the month, the Sabres battled to qualify for the 2008 Stanley Cup playoffs from their 10th place in the Eastern Conference standings.

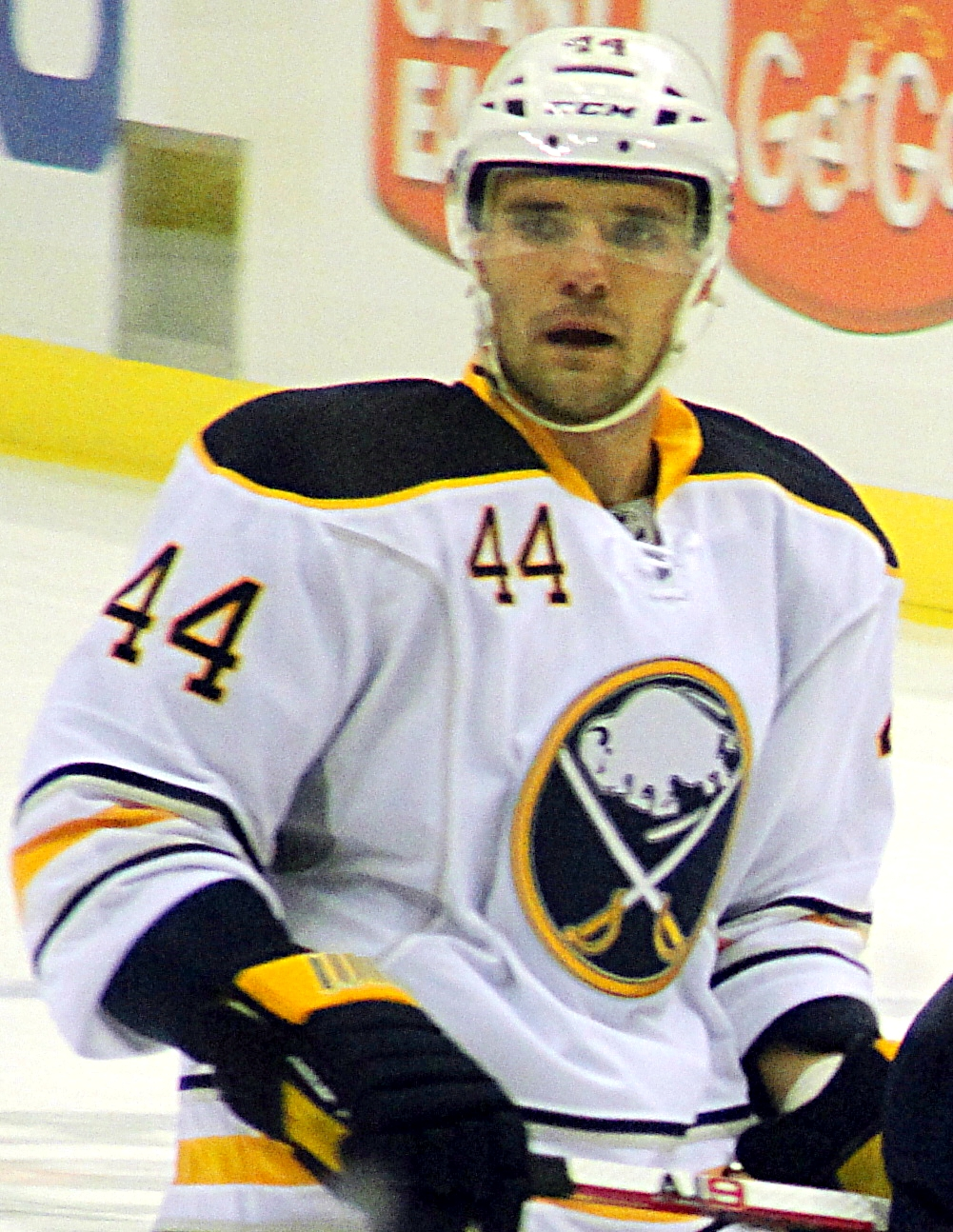
Sekera with the Buffalo Sabres in 2011.

As a result of his performance during the previous season, Sekera began the 2008–09 season with the Sabres. He tallied 13 points through 43 games before suffering an ankle injury. Prior to the injury, he was also averaging over 22 minutes of ice time per game. Upon returning to the lineup, he finished with a career-high 19 points through 69 games. Sekera was once again named to the Sabres' opening night roster to begin the 2009–10 season and played in three games before suffering a rib injury.

In the final year of his contract, Sekera recorded a career-high of 29 points through 76 games, including three goals. As such, he signed a four-year contract extension with the Sabres worth $11 million. He had originally requested salary arbitration. During the 2012–13 NHL lockout, which canceled the majority of the first half of the 2012–13 season, Sekera played in his native Slovakia with Slovan Bratislava of the Kontinental Hockey League (KHL). He returned to the Sabres following the return of NHL play in January 2013.

==== Carolina Hurricanes ====
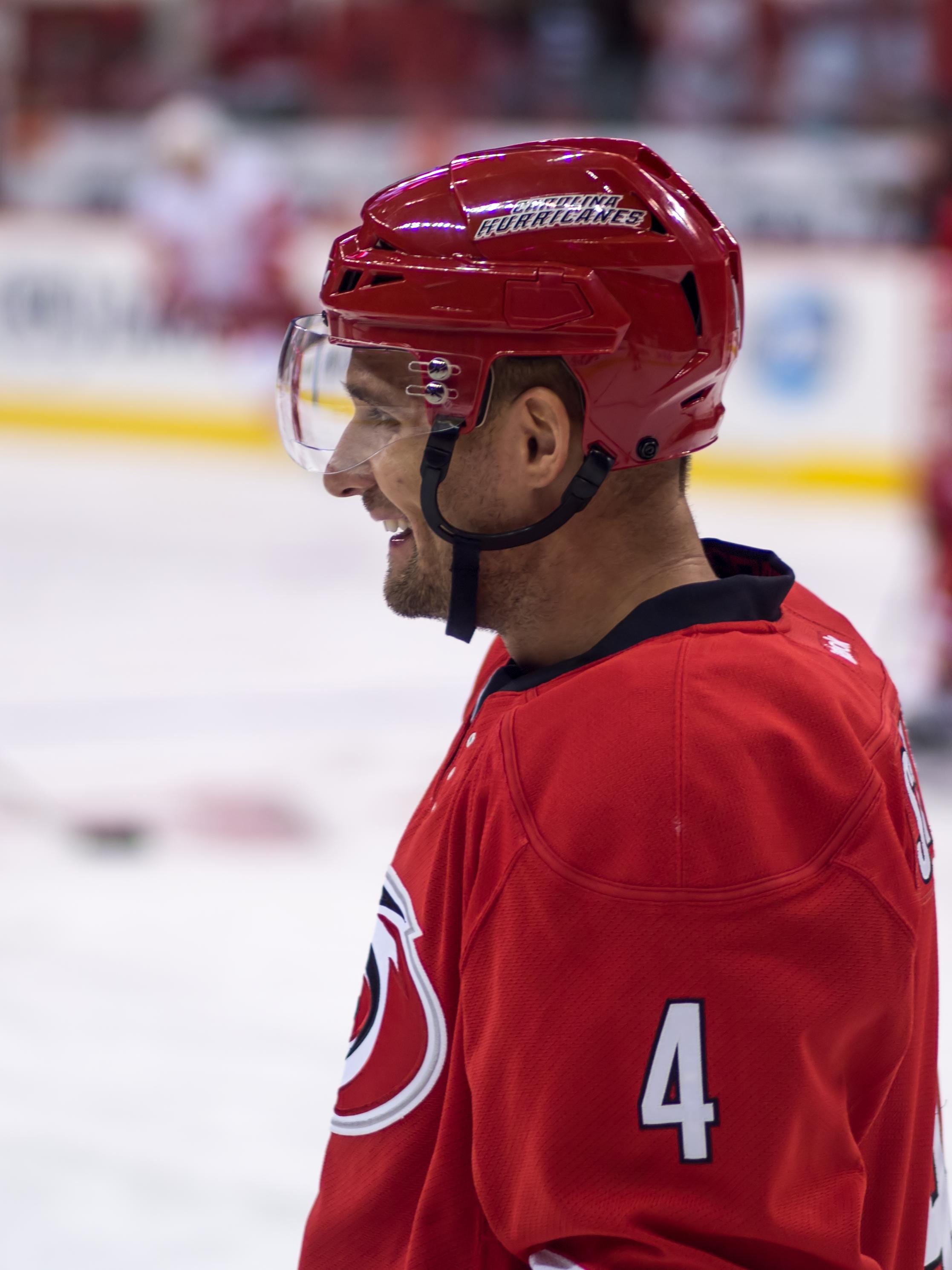
Sekera with the Hurricanes in 2013

On 30 June 2013, during the 2013 NHL entry draft, Sekera was traded by the Sabres to the Carolina Hurricanes in exchange for the team's second-round draft pick (ultimately used to select J. T. Compher) and defenceman Jamie McBain. Upon joining the Hurricanes, Sekera sparked offensively and recorded back-to-back goals in consecutive games for the first time since February 2010. Through his first season with the Hurricanes, Sekera played alongside defensive partner Justin Faulk and recorded new career-highs in goals and points. By February, he had tallied nine goals and 32 points to tie for 12th among NHL defencemen in points. As a result of his success, he was named the NHL's Third Star of the Week in January. He finished the 2013–14 season with a new career-best 44 points while leading all Hurricanes skaters in blocked shots and average time on ice per game. On 11 April 2014, he underwent season ending abdominal surgery with a recovery time of approximately six weeks.

Following his career-best season, Sekera returned to the Hurricanes for the 2014–15 season. During a game against the New York Rangers, Sekera tripped over Cam Ward's outstretched pad and went headfirst into the end boards. As such, he remained out of the lineup for one game. He missed a second game later in the season after blocking a shot during a 2-1 win over the Nashville Predators. By February 2015, Sekera had recorded two goals and 17 assists in 57 games and was ranked high as possible trade bait. He was eventually traded to the Los Angeles Kings in exchange for a conditional first-round draft pick and defensive prospect Roland McKeown on 25 February.

==== Los Angeles Kings ====
Sekera's tenure with the Kings only lasted to the conclusion of the 2014–15 season. Upon joining the team, he recorded a goal and three assists through 16 games.

==== Edmonton Oilers ====
On 1 July 2015, Sekera left the Los Angeles Kings to sign a six-year, $33 million contract with the Edmonton Oilers. Following the signing, he became second-most experienced defenceman on the Oilers, behind Andrew Ference who had played 901 NHL games at the time. As such, he stated he wished to be a quiet leader for the team on and off the ice. Sekera began the season playing with Mark Fayne and skated on the teams' second power play unit. He was soon moved to play on the top defensive pair with Darnell Nurse and the pair ranked in the top three of average ice time by January. At the end of his first season with the club, Sekera recorded six goals and 30 points in a career-high 81 games.

During the 2016 off-season, the Oilers signed Kris Russell to add another veteran defenceman to their blueline. Following the addition of Russell, Sekera was moved to the left wing to test Russell on the right. He finished the 2016–17 season with a career-high eight goals and 35 points in 80 games as the Oilers qualified for the 2017 Stanley Cup playoffs. However, during Game 5 against the Anaheim Ducks Sekera suffered a season-ending torn ACL. In spite of his injuries, Sekera tallied eight points in 32 games for the Oilers.

Sekera continued to heal from his torn ACL during the 2017 off-season and made his 2017–18 season debut on 22 December in a 3–2 win over the St. Louis Blues. However, his return to the lineup was shortlived as he was placed on injured reserve in February 2018 after taking a puck to the face during a game against the Anaheim Ducks. He was activated off injured reserve on 24 February and placed on the third defensive pairing with Matt Benning.

During the 2018 off-season, Sekera injured his Achilles tendon while training and was set to be out indefinitely. In the 2018–19 season, following a lengthy rehab, Sekera returned to play on a conditioning assignment with AHL affiliate the Bakersfield Condors, on 5 February 2019. After five games, Sekera returned to the Oilers and made his first appearance with Edmonton in over a year, playing a third-pairing defensive role against the Arizona Coyotes on 19 February 2019. Sekera played out the season with the Oilers to finish with 4 assists in 24 games.

Having been limited to just 60 regular season games over the previous two seasons, Sekera's tenure with Edmonton ended as he was placed on unconditional waivers by the Oilers in order to buy out the remaining two years of his initial six-year contract on 30 June 2019.

==== Dallas Stars ====
On 1 July 2019, Sekera was signed as a free agent to a one-year $1.5 million contract with the Dallas Stars. Following the signing, Sekera was praised by coach Jim Montgomery for being "a top-two or top-four (defenseman) in the NHL" and "a guy who has been leaned upon by a lot of coaches." During the pre-season, Sekera was placed on a defensive pairing with Miro Heiskanen after impressing Montgomery with his puck-handling and decision-making skills. He played in three games with the Stars before suffering a shoulder injury during a game against the Pittsburgh Penguins and was helped off of the ice. He subsequently missed four games with overall body soreness before returning to the lineup as a replacement for an injured John Klingberg. While he was recovering, Heiskanen was paired with Jamie Oleksiak so Montgomery paired Sekera with Esa Lindell. Adding a veteran presence to the Stars' third pairing on the blueline, Sekera appeared in 57 games in the 2019–20 season and posted two goals and six assists. While playing a bottom six role, Sekera and the Stars push for a deep run in the 2020 Stanley Cup playoffs. During the Final series against the Tampa Bay Lightning, Sekera blocked a shot in the first period in Game 5 and left the ice until overtime. In the playoffs, Sekera appeared in a career high 27 postseason games, adding one assist, in helping the Stars reach the 2020 Stanley Cup Finals.

On 4 October 2020, Sekera signed a two-year, $3 million contract extension that carries an annual salary cap hit of $1.5 million to remain with the Stars. Once the NHL resumed play, Sekera played in the Stars' 4-1 loss to the Hurricanes before being placed on the NHL's COVID list. As the Stars pushed to qualify for the 2021 Stanley Cup playoffs, Sekera was struck by a puck and named a game-time decision for the following game against the Columbus Blue Jackets. He finished the 2020–21 season with five points and a plus-12 rating in 46 games.

Sekera returned to the Stars to compete in the 2021–22 season but remained a healthy scratch for the first few games. However, as a result of their slow start, Sekera, Jacob Peterson, and Riley Tufte were placed into the lineup as a replacement for Blake Comeau, Joel Kiviranta, and Thomas Harley on 14 November. During his first game back into the lineup, the Stars won their first game within 60 minutes of regulation.

== International play ==
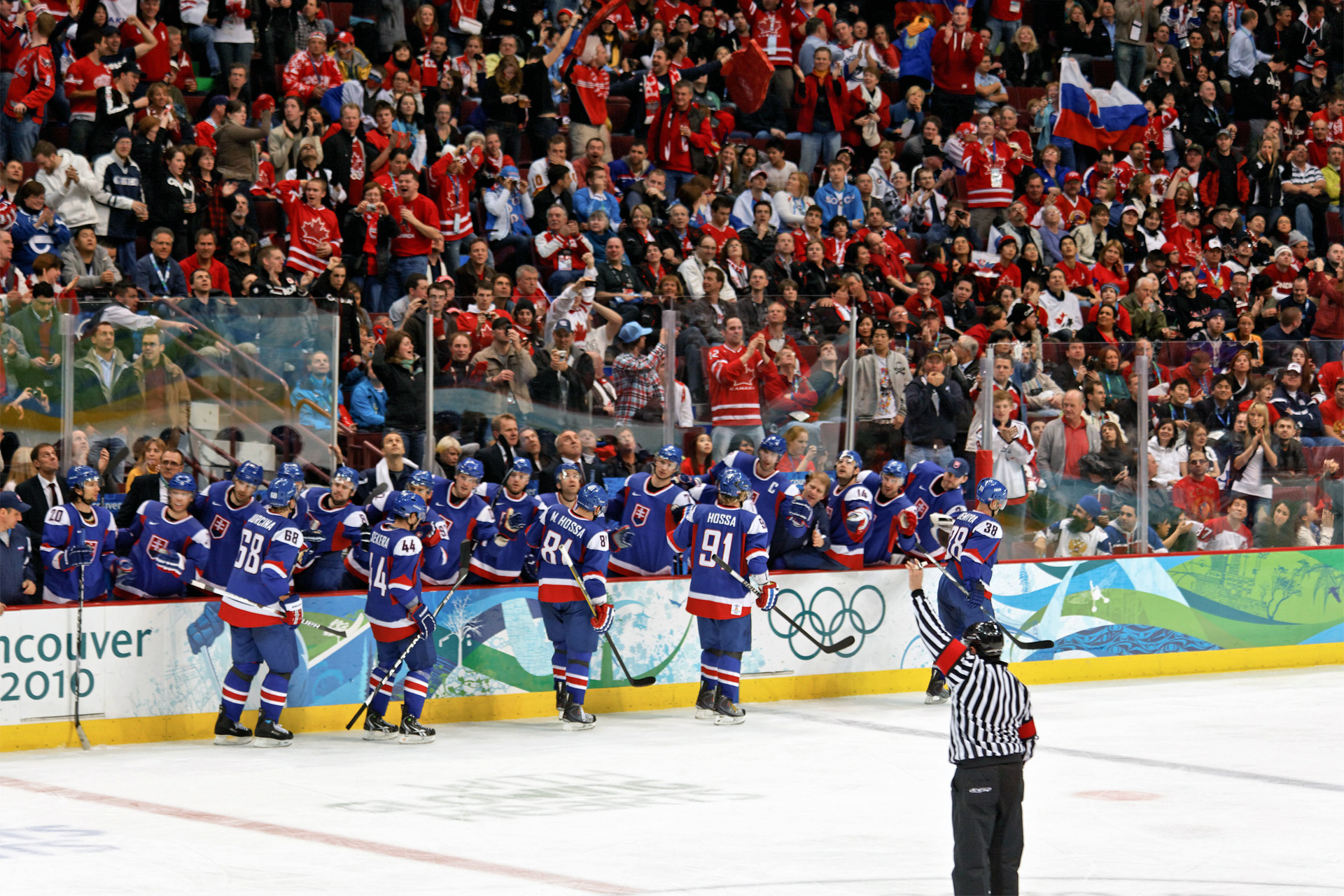
Sekera (#44) with Team Slovakia at the 2010 Winter Olympics.

As a citizen of Slovakia, Sekera has represented his home country at both the junior and senior international levels. He represented Slovakia for the first time at the 2004 IIHF World U18 Championships. Following this, he competed with Slovakia at the 2005 World Junior Ice Hockey Championships and captained their 2006 World Junior Ice Hockey Championships team.

Sekera was promoted to Slovakia's senior team for the first time at the 2008 IIHF World Championship. He earned his first point of the tournament, an assist, to help Slovakia win their first game in the relegation round. He returned to the senior national team for the 2009 IIHF World Championship, where he finished with two points in 10 games as Slovakia failed to qualify to the next round. Following another unsuccessful tournament, Sekera was named to Slovakia's 2010 Winter Olympics roster for the first time and competed at the 2010 IIHF World Championship. After failing to medal at all international tournaments, Sekera and the Slovak national team won a silver medal at the 2012 IIHF World Championship. During the tournament, Sekera tallied nine points which tied for second-best among tournament defenders.

Sekera returned to the Olympic stage in 2014. He played with Boston Bruins defenceman Zdeno Chara throughout the tournament as Slovakia's top pairing but the team failed to medal. Two years later, Sekera won another silver medal with Team Europe at the 2016 World Cup of Hockey. On 8 October 2021, Sekera was named to Slovakia's 2022 Winter Olympics roster.

== Personal life ==
Sekera and his wife Katarina have one child together.

== Career statistics ==
=== Regular season and playoffs ===
			Regular season					Playoffs
Season	Team	League	GP	G	A	Pts	PIM	GP	G	A	Pts	PIM
2001–02	Dukla Trenčín	SVK U20	52	5	10	15	10	—	—	—	—	—
2002–03	Dukla Trenčín	SVK U20	48	9	15	24	20	—	—	—	—	—
2003–04	Dukla Trenčín	SVK U18	3	0	0	0	2	5	2	3	5	2
2003–04	Dukla Trenčín	SVK U20	45	5	12	17	16	2	0	1	1	4
2003–04	Dukla Trenčín II	SVK.2	5	0	0	0	0	—	—	—	—	—
2003–04	Dukla Trenčín	SVK	3	0	0	0	2	—	—	—	—	—
2004–05	Owen Sound Attack	OHL	52	7	21	28	18	6	0	4	4	4
2005–06	Owen Sound Attack	OHL	51	21	34	55	54	11	5	8	13	9
2006–07	Rochester Americans	AHL	54	3	16	19	28	—	—	—	—	—
2006–07	Buffalo Sabres	NHL	2	0	0	0	2	—	—	—	—	—
2007–08	Rochester Americans	AHL	40	2	15	17	22	—	—	—	—	—
2007–08	Buffalo Sabres	NHL	37	2	6	8	16	—	—	—	—	—
2008–09	Buffalo Sabres	NHL	69	3	16	19	22	—	—	—	—	—
2009–10	Buffalo Sabres	NHL	49	4	7	11	6	6	0	0	0	7
2010–11	Buffalo Sabres	NHL	76	3	26	29	34	2	1	0	1	4
2011–12	Buffalo Sabres	NHL	69	3	10	13	18	—	—	—	—	—
2012–13	Slovan Bratislava	KHL	25	3	9	12	8	—	—	—	—	—
2012–13	Buffalo Sabres	NHL	37	2	10	12	4	—	—	—	—	—
2013–14	Carolina Hurricanes	NHL	74	11	33	44	20	—	—	—	—	—
2014–15	Carolina Hurricanes	NHL	57	2	17	19	8	—	—	—	—	—
2014–15	Los Angeles Kings	NHL	16	1	3	4	6	—	—	—	—	—
2015–16	Edmonton Oilers	NHL	81	6	24	30	12	—	—	—	—	—
2016–17	Edmonton Oilers	NHL	80	8	27	35	18	11	1	2	3	2
2017–18	Edmonton Oilers	NHL	36	0	8	8	6	—	—	—	—	—
2018–19	Bakersfield Condors	AHL	5	0	2	2	2	—	—	—	—	—
2018–19	Edmonton Oilers	NHL	24	0	4	4	6	—	—	—	—	—
2019–20	Dallas Stars	NHL	57	2	6	8	14	27	0	1	1	0
2020–21	Dallas Stars	NHL	46	3	2	5	4	—	—	—	—	—
2021–22	Dallas Stars	NHL	32	1	3	4	16	—	—	—	—	—
NHL totals			842	51	202	253	212	46	2	3	5	13

=== International ===
Medal record

Representing Slovakia

Ice hockey

World Championships
Silver medal – second place	2012 Helsinki	

Year	Team	Event	Result	GP	G	A	Pts	PIM
2004	Slovakia	U18	6th	6	1	1	2	18
2005	Slovakia	WJC	7th	6	1	0	1	2
2006	Slovakia	WJC	8th	6	2	3	5	2
2008	Slovakia	WC	13th	5	0	1	1	2
2009	Slovakia	WC	4th	6	0	2	2	2
2010	Slovakia	OG	4th	7	1	0	1	0
2010	Slovakia	WC	12th	6	0	2	2	2
2012	Slovakia	WC	2nd place, silver medalist(s)	10	2	7	9	6
2013	Slovakia	WC	8th	8	1	1	2	2
2014	Slovakia	OG	11th	4	0	2	2	0
2016	Slovakia	WC	9th	7	3	1	4	6
2016	Team Europe	WCH	2nd	6	0	2	2	4
2018	Slovakia	WC	9th	7	1	2	3	4
2019	Slovakia	WC	9th	7	2	3	5	4
Junior totals				18	4	4	8	22
Senior totals				73	10	23	33	32

== Awards and honors ==
Award	Year
OHL
OHL All-Rookie Team	2005
OHL First All-Star Team	2006
Max Kaminsky Trophy	2006

Awards and achievements
Preceded by Danny Syvret	Winner of the Max Kaminsky Trophy; 2005–06	Succeeded by Marc Staal
