= Shayne Gostisbehere =

American ice hockey player (born 1993)

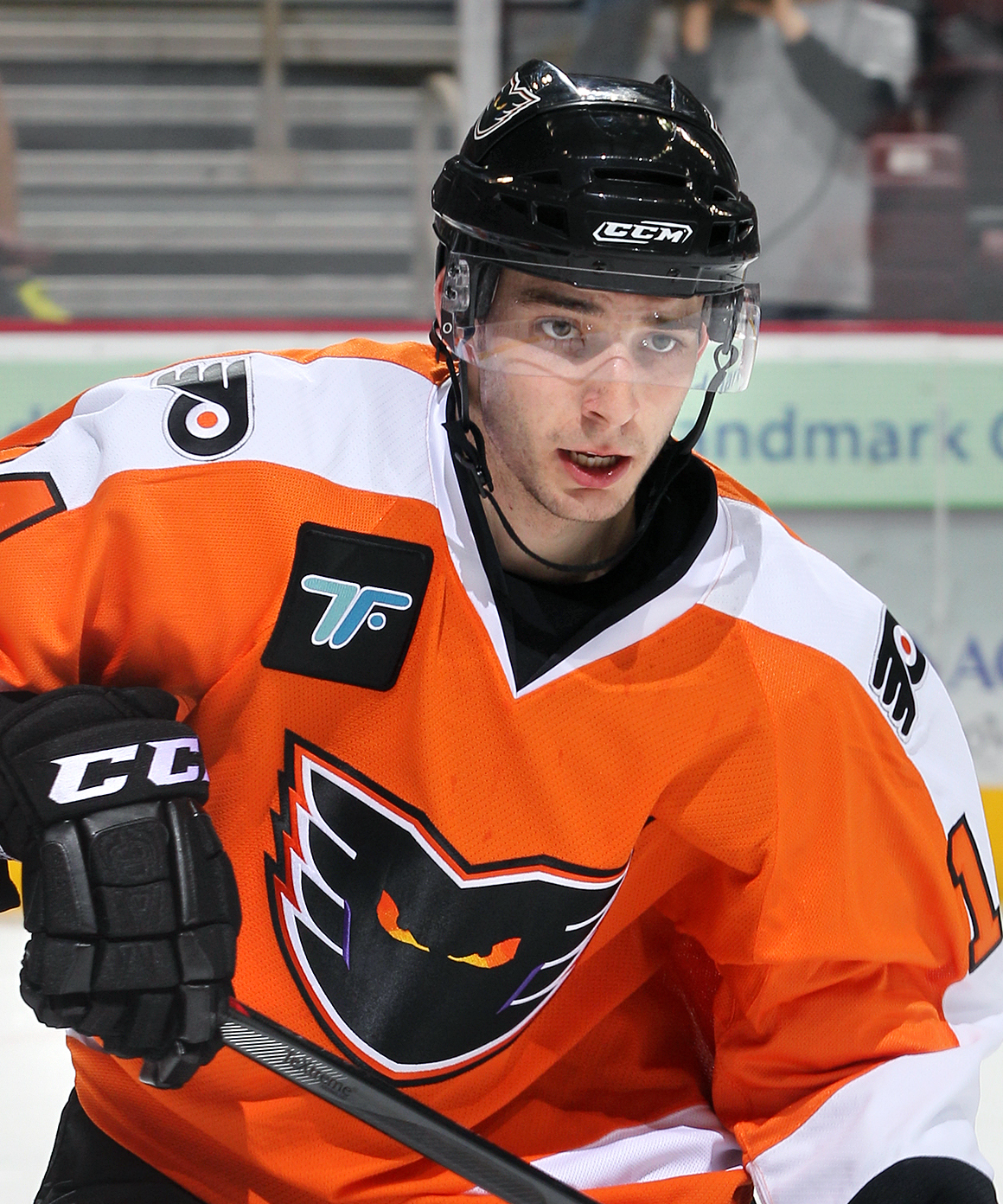
- Gostisbehere with the Adirondack Phantoms in 2014
- Born: April 20, 1993 (age 33) Pembroke Pines, Florida, U.S.
- Height: 5 ft 11 in (180 cm)
- Weight: 183 lb (83 kg; 13 st 1 lb)
- Position: Defense
- Shoots: Left
- NHL team Former teams: Carolina Hurricanes; Philadelphia Flyers; Arizona Coyotes; Detroit Red Wings
- NHL draft: 78th overall, 2012; Philadelphia Flyers
- Playing career: 2014–present

Shayne Gostisbehere (/ɡɑːstɪsbɛər/ gaws-TIHS-bair; born April 20, 1993), is an American professional ice hockey player who is a defenseman for the Carolina Hurricanes of the National Hockey League (NHL).

Gostisbehere was born in Pembroke Pines, Florida, and began playing hockey with the youth affiliate of the Florida Panthers. Halfway through high school, he transferred from Marjory Stoneman Douglas in Florida to South Kent School in South Kent, Connecticut. From there, he moved to Schenectady, New York, where he played three seasons of college ice hockey with the Union Dutchmen of the ECAC Hockey conference, helping to take the team to their first NCAA championship title in 2014. Gostisbehere was named the tournament's Most Outstanding Player, and was a finalist for the 2014 Hobey Baker Award. During this time, he helped take the United States national junior team to a gold medal at the 2013 World Junior Championships.

The Flyers selected Gostisbehere in the third round, 78th overall, of the 2012 NHL entry draft, and he signed an entry-level contract with the team in 2014. After only a handful of appearances with the Flyers and their American Hockey League (AHL) affiliate, the Adirondack Phantoms, Gostisbehere suffered an ACL tear that benched him for most of the 2014–15 season. That fall began a record-breaking season for Gostisbehere, whose 15-game point streak was the longest of any rookie defenseman in the NHL. He became the youngest Flyer to receive the Barry Ashbee Trophy for best team defenseman, and was a runner-up for the Calder Memorial Trophy. That summer, he represented Team North America at the 2016 World Cup of Hockey. After a lackluster sophomore season, a successful pairing with fellow two-way defenseman Ivan Provorov for most of the 2017–18 season helped Gostisbehere secure his second Barry Ashbee Trophy in three years.

From that point, a recurring knee injury began to impact Gostisbehere's career. He was initially injured in October 2019 during a game against the Colorado Avalanche, and dropped from 65 points the year prior to only 37 points in the 2018–19 season. An acute injury to the knee in January 2020 forced Gostisbehere to undergo arthroscopy, and his performance continued to suffer when he was brought back prematurely from the surgery. Gostisbehere underwent a second arthroscopic surgery during the NHL's COVID-19 shutdown and helped the Flyers advance over the Montreal Canadiens in the 2020 Stanley Cup playoffs. He struggled to find a rhythm the following year, after missing the first six games of the season to COVID-19, and was further limited by a placement on waivers, another knee injury, and a two-game suspension that May. Difficulties managing the salary cap imposed by the NHL for the 2021–22 season forced the Flyers to trade Gostisbehere to Arizona in July 2021. He signed a three-year, $9.6 million contract with the Carolina Hurricanes on July 1, 2024. Gostisbehere won the Stanley Cup with the Hurricanes in 2026.

== Early life and education ==
Gostisbehere was born on April 20, 1993, in Pembroke Pines, Florida. His father Regis was Basque, born in the French Basque Country, but moved to Florida in the hopes of becoming a professional jai alai player. It was there that he met Gostisbehere's mother, Christine, who was working at the local jai alai venue. When Gostisbehere was two years old, his father suffered a career-ending eye injury. Gostisbehere's sister was a figure skater, and he would accompany her at the local ice rink, which sparked his interest in ice hockey. His maternal grandfather, Denis Brodeur, was a Québécois hockey player for a traveling hockey league based in West Palm Beach, Florida, and he began teaching his grandson how to skate when Gostisbehere was three years old.

The Florida Panthers of the National Hockey League (NHL) began playing six months after Gostisbehere was born, and he learned how to ice skate at the Panthers' training facility in Coral Springs, Florida. While skating with the Junior Panthers under-18 'AAA' ice hockey team, Gostisbehere helped to win the Presidents' Day AAA Challenge championship in 2007. As an adolescent, Gostisbehere spent two years at Marjory Stoneman Douglas High School. Rather than play for the school hockey team, which was less competitive than he desired, Gostisbehere played on traveling teams before transferring to South Kent School, a boarding school in Connecticut, to finish his high school education and continue his hockey career.

== College career ==
After being passed over in the 2011 NHL entry draft, Gostisbehere chose to play college ice hockey for Union College in the ECAC Hockey conference. His first collegiate point came on October 22, 2011, with an assist in Union's 5–0 shutout win over the Rochester Institute of Technology. On December 10, he scored his first collegiate goal as part of a 5–2 victory over Rensselaer Polytechnic Institute at the Festivus Faceoff in Lake Placid, New York. Gostisbehere earned ECAC Rookie of the Week honors at the start of February, when he matched a school record by scoring four assists in a 4–4 tie against Cornell. He finished his freshman season with five goals and 17 assists in 41 games, and was named to both the 2011–12 ECAC Hockey All-Rookie Team and the All-Tournament Team.

The Philadelphia Flyers selected Gostisbehere in the third round, 78th overall, of the 2012 NHL entry draft. He was the seventh Union men's hockey player ever drafted, and the first ever defenseman. Rather than sign with the team immediately, Gostisbehere chose to stay with Union and continue to play college hockey. He had a breakout 2012–13 season, averaging a point per game in his first 13 outings. Gostisbehere scored eight goals and 18 assists in 36 collegiate games during his sophomore season, and was named to both the All-ECAC Hockey Second Team and to the ACHA All-America East Second Team. At the 2013 NCAA Division I men's ice hockey tournament, Gostisbehere scored one of Union's three power play goals in a 5–1 upset of reigning champions Boston College. Union's tournament run came to an end in the following game, when Matthew Peca scored a hat trick in the first three minutes and 12 seconds of the East Regional finals, buoying Quinnipiac to a 5–1 victory.

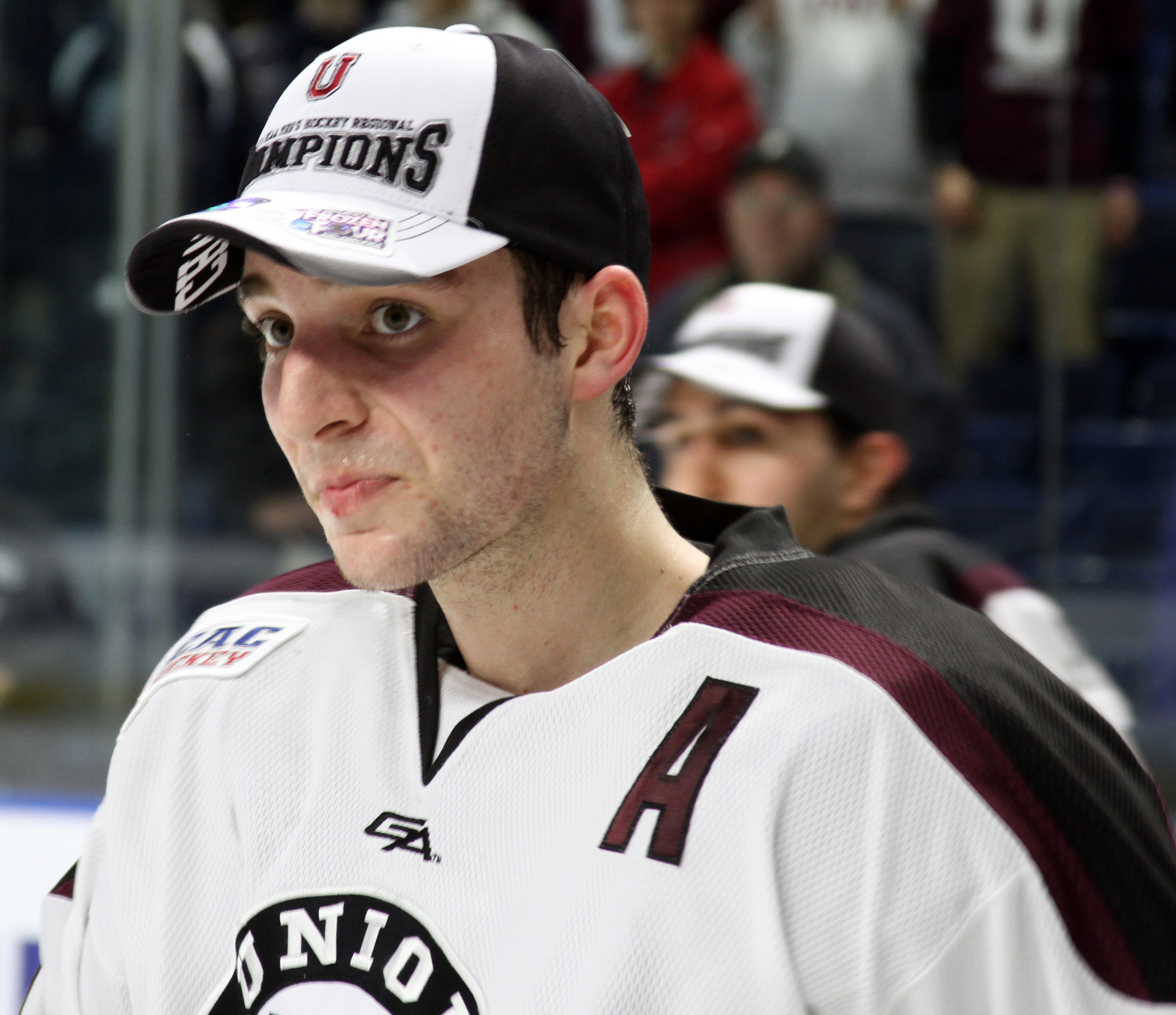
Gostisbehere with Union after the 2014 NCAA Division I men's ice hockey tournament

As a junior during the 2013–14 season, Gostisbehere continued to dominate offensively, scoring 15 points in the first 13 games of the year. In addition to scoring four goals and 13 assists in 22 ECAC games, Gostisbehere improved his defensive ability, finishing the regular season with a +18 plus-minus rating. For his performance, Gostisbehere was named both the ECAC Hockey Co-Player of the Year, alongside St. Lawrence senior Greg Carey, and Best Defensive Defenseman. He was also named to the All-ECAC and ACHA First Teams, and to both the ECAC Hockey and the NCAA East Regional All-Tournament teams. Gostisbehere additionally came in first in fan voting for the 2014 Hobey Baker Award, given to the top college hockey player in the US, and was named a top-10 finalist for the trophy. The award ultimately went to Johnny Gaudreau of Boston College.

Also as a junior, Gostisbehere helped lead Union to their first-ever NCAA championship. In the championship game at Wells Fargo Center in Philadelphia, home of the team that drafted him, Gostisbehere scored one goal and two assists in a 7–4 victory over Minnesota. It was Union's fourth ever NCAA tournament appearance, and their first championship, and Gostisbehere was named the tournament's Most Outstanding Player for his championship performance.

== Professional career ==
=== Philadelphia Flyers ===
==== 2014–2016 ====
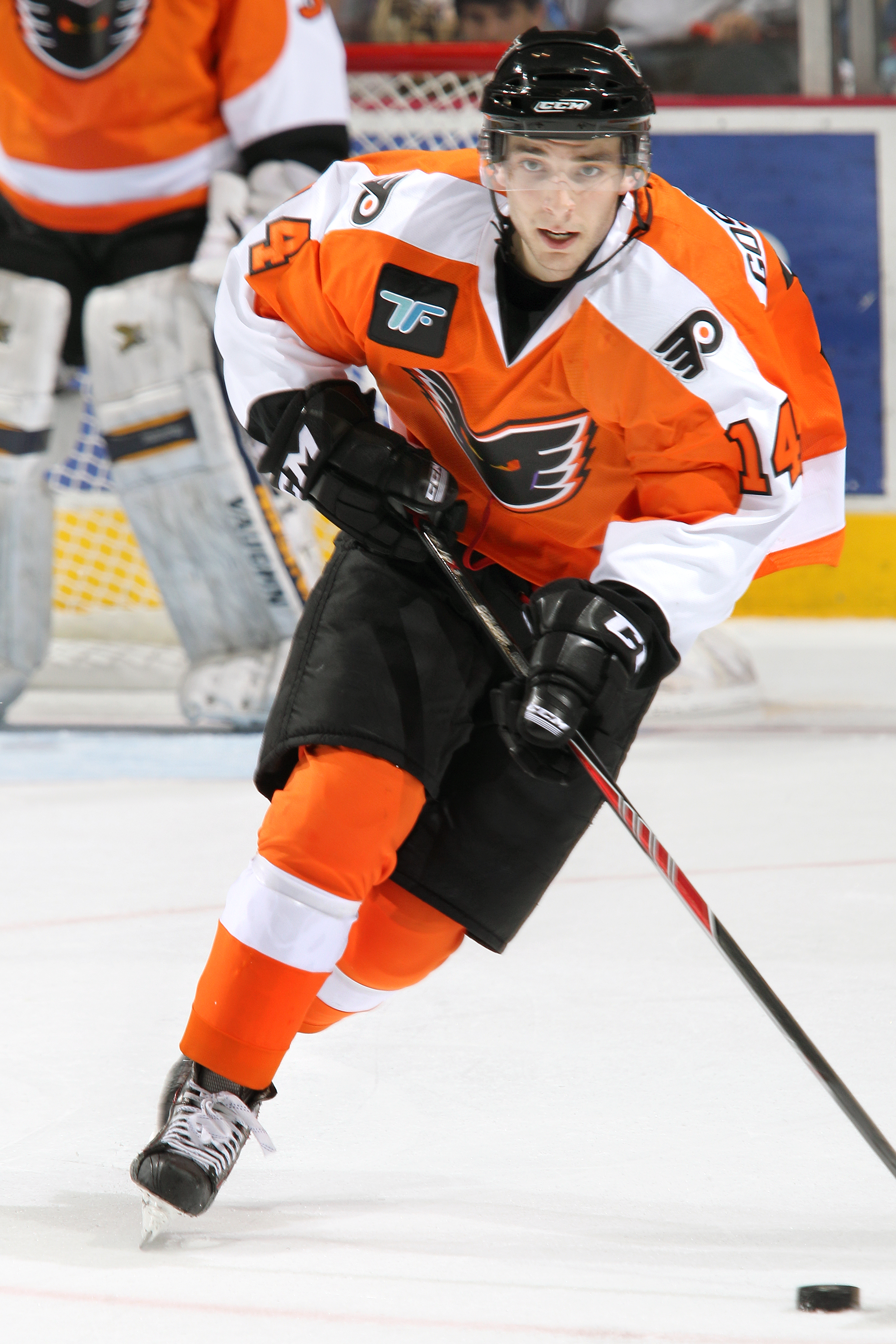
Gostisbehere with the Adirondack Phantoms in 2014

Following his NCAA championship run, Gostisbehere signed a three-year, entry-level contract with the Flyers on April 15, 2014. He was first assigned to the Adirondack Phantoms, the team's American Hockey League (AHL) affiliate. Gostisbehere joined the team for their final two games of the 2013–14 season, a 3–2 overtime loss to the Bridgeport Sound Tigers on April 19, and a 2–1 loss to the Hershey Bears on April 20.

Gostisbehere began the 2014–15 season with the Phantoms, but was recalled to the Flyers as a replacement for injured defensemen Braydon Coburn and Andrew MacDonald. Flyers general manager Ron Hextall intended for Gostisbehere's call-up to be temporary as he searched for a veteran free agent to replace the injured skaters. Gostisbehere made his NHL debut on October 25, 2014, pairing with Luke Schenn in a 4–2 victory over the Detroit Red Wings. He was moved back to the Phantoms on November 1, to make room on the 23-player active roster for the newly-healthy Vincent Lecavalier. On November 7, in his second game back in the AHL, Gostisbehere took a check from Kevin Raine of the Manchester Monarchs and felt a “pop” in his knee, later diagnosed as an anterior cruciate ligament injury. He did not play again that year, registering only five AHL and two NHL games in his first professional hockey season.

That summer, Gostisbehere worked with Flyers athletic trainer Jim McCrossin, who focused on rehabilitating the skater's entire body rather than focusing on the injured knee. He impressed at training camp, scoring three goals in three preseason games, but an uneven defensive performance led head coach Dave Hakstol to send Gostisbehere to the Phantoms for the beginning of the 2015–16 season. There, he recorded 10 points in 14 games before receiving another NHL call-up on November 14, 2015. He scored his first NHL point that same day, assisting in Wayne Simmonds’ game-tying goal in an ultimate 3–2 overtime win against the Carolina Hurricanes. His first goal came three days later, less than four minutes into a 3–2 shootout victory over the Los Angeles Kings. His second and third NHL goals both came in overtime games, making Gostisbehere the first rookie in Flyers history to score multiple overtime goals in the same season.

On February 13, 2016, Gostisbehere scored his 10th goal of the season in the third period of a 2–1 overtime loss to the New Jersey Devils. It was the 11th game in a row that he had registered a point, passing Barry Beck's 1978 record for the longest point streak of any rookie defenseman. On February 20, Gostisbehere became the first rookie in NHL history to score four overtime goals in one season when he helped defeat the Toronto Maple Leafs 5–4. His 15-game point streak ended after that game, as he failed to register a point in the Flyers' 3–1 loss to the Hurricanes. Gostisbehere's point run was the third-longest of any rookie since 1988, and was the longest of any defenseman since Chris Chelios scored points 15 games in a row for the Chicago Blackhawks in 1995. Gostisbehere finished his rookie NHL season with 17 goals and 29 assists, and he became the youngest ever recipient of the Barry Ashbee Trophy, given to the Flyers' best defenseman. The Flyers also awarded Gostisbehere the Gene Hart Memorial Award, given to the player who demonstrates the most "heart". He was also the runner-up for the 2016 Calder Memorial Trophy, awarded annually to the top rookie in the NHL. Artemi Panarin of the Blackhawks ultimately won the award. Following the NHL Awards Show, Gostisbehere was officially named to the NHL All-Rookie Team for the 2015–16 season.

==== 2016–2018 ====
Following a disappointing postseason performance at the 2016 Stanley Cup playoffs, the Flyers revealed that Gostisbehere had played through the end of the season with a right hip injury. He underwent surgery for the hip on May 17, 2016, with an expected recovery time of 10–12 weeks. When he returned to the ice for the 2016–17 season, Gostisbehere fell into a sophomore slump, struggling both defensively and offensively. As he fought to play out of the slump, Gostisbehere was a healthy scratch three times, including in back-to-back games. As the season went on, Gostisbehere deleted Twitter from his phone, as the positive fan reaction that he had received during his rookie season had turned negative. He had returned to form by the end of the season, leading the Flyers defense for the second year in a row with 39 points in 76 games. In the final eight games of the season, he averaged one point per game, as well as a +3 plus–minus rating. He attributed his early-season struggles to a mental block, rather than lingering pain from his hip injury, and attributed his improvement at the end of the year to an increased sense of confidence and decreased stress.

On June 9, 2017, shortly before the 2017 NHL Expansion Draft, the Flyers signed Gostisbehere to a six-year, $27 million contract. He began the 2017–18 season playing on the second defensive pair with Robert Hägg, only briefly teaming with Ivan Provorov on the top line. During a December 23 game against the Columbus Blue Jackets, however, Hakstol rearranged the lines and paired Gostisbehere with Provorov once again. Impressed with the results, Hakstol kept the pair together through the end of the season. Being paired with Provorov, a two-way player who Gostisbehere admitted was "years better than me defensively", helped him improve on the defensive end, putting up stronger shot suppression and defensive zone starts. Gostisbehere also continued to generate offensively: on November 9, 2017, with an assist to Jakub Voráček in a 3–1 win against the Blackhawks, Gostisbehere became the fastest defenseman in Flyers history to score his 100th NHL point, doing so in 155 games. The previous record holder, Behn Wilson, did so in 163 games. By the end of the year, Gostisbehere had put up 150 career points, the most of any Flyers defenseman in his first three seasons. Gostisbehere scored 13 goals and 52 assists in the 2017–18 regular season, and was awarded his second Barry Ashbee Trophy in three years.

==== 2018–2021 ====
Coming off of a successful 2017–18 season, Gostisbehere referred to the 2018–19 season as "the toughest season I've been through personally in my four years". He dropped to 37 total points, nine goals and 28 assists, as well as a −20 plus-minus. He admitted after the season that a knee surgery he had suffered during an October 22 game against the Colorado Avalanche had continued to bother him throughout the season, limiting his effectiveness on the ice. That offseason, Gostisbehere spent time at the Flyers' training facility in Voorhees Township, New Jersey, focusing on improving the mental aspect of his performance.

Gostisbehere's struggles continued into the 2019–20 season, culminating in a three-game benching in November. He had begun to improve, scoring 12 points in 40 games, before suffering an injury in a 5–4 overtime loss to the Hurricanes on January 7, 2020. The injury required arthroscopic surgery, which took Gostisbehere out of the lineup for the remainder of January. He told reporters that he knew, even before suffering an acute injury at Carolina, that he would have to address his ongoing knee pain at some point, and that the surgery gave him a chance to reset and play without pain. His return to the club was muddled, however, and Alain Vigneault admitted that Gostisbehere likely would have benefitted from a rehab assignment with the Phantoms rather than returning immediately to NHL play. Between Gostisbehere's injury and a series of healthy scratches, he appeared in only two of the Flyers' last 26 games before the COVID-19 pandemic forced the NHL to suspend play in March. During the NHL shutdown, Gostisbehere underwent a second surgery after realizing that his knee had not fully recovered from the first. When the NHL resumed for the 2020 Stanley Cup playoffs in Toronto, Gostisbehere was one of 31 Flyers selected to play in the "bubble". He played in the first two games of the Flyers' opening series against the Montreal Canadiens, and started in the Game 6 lineup in place of Matt Niskanen, who had received a one-game suspension. The Flyers, buoyed by a strong defense, captured the series and advanced to the Eastern Conference semifinals. There, the Flyers were defeated in seven games by the New York Islanders.

Prior to the 2020–21 season, Gostisbehere contracted COVID-19, forcing him to miss the first six games of the shortened season. After a slow start as he regained his offensive ability, Gostisbehere looked to be returning to form, scoring five goals in 10 games between late February and early March. On March 30, 2021, however, the Flyers unexpectedly placed Gostisbehere on waivers, to add more "flexibility" to their 23-man roster. He cleared the process and was placed on the Flyers' taxi squad. Gostisbehere suffered another knee injury, a mild ACL sprain, on April 15, which took him out of the lineup for a week. On May 5, in another match against the Penguins, Gostisbehere received a two-game suspension for a hit to former teammate Mark Friedman. The suspension, the first of Gostisbehere's career, proved controversial, as the day before, Tom Wilson of the Washington Capitals had not been suspended for a high-profile hit on Artemi Panarin. Despite these setbacks, Gostisbehere pushed through to score nine points in his final 16 games of the season. Altogether, he put up nine goals and 11 assists in 41 games of the 2021 season.

=== Arizona Coyotes ===
On July 22, 2021, the Flyers traded Gostisbehere to the Arizona Coyotes in exchange for future considerations. The Coyotes also received two 2022 NHL entry draft selections from the Flyers as compensation for taking on Gostisbehere (#36 overall - Artem Duda , and #216 overall - traded away). The trade was criticized by Flyers fans, who questioned why the Flyers did not receive anything in exchange for Gostisbehere and the draft picks. General manager Chuck Fletcher explained that Philadelphia had been hindered by the strict salary cap that the NHL had instituted for the 2021–22 season, and that the size of Gostisbehere's contract had made it difficult to retain him.

Although Gostisbehere was immediately productive in Arizona, with 11 of his team's 48 points through the first 13 games of the 2021–22 season, the Coyotes were not as successful, going 1–11–1 in that same time frame. Despite the team's poor record, Gostisbehere was happy with the trade, saying that coming to Arizona was "a little bit of a reset for my career" and "a good blend for myself and my family".

=== Carolina Hurricanes ===
Nearing the 2023 NHL trade deadline and in the final year of his contract which he originally signed with the Flyers, Gostisbehere was traded from the Arizona Coyotes on March 1, 2023, to the Carolina Hurricanes for a third-round pick in 2026.

=== Detroit Red Wings ===
Having concluded his contract with the Hurricanes, Gostisbehere left as a free agent and was signed at the opening of free agency to a one-year, $4.125 million contract with the Detroit Red Wings on July 1, 2023. During the 2023–24 season he recorded ten goals and 46 assists in 81 games for the Red Wings. His 56 points ranked 14th among all NHL defensemen.

=== Return to Carolina ===
On July 1, 2024, Gostisbehere signed a three-year, $9.6 million contract with the Hurricanes. Gostisbehere had a strong start to the 2024–25 season with six goals and 27 points in 35 games before suffering an upper-body injury in December 2024.

== International play ==
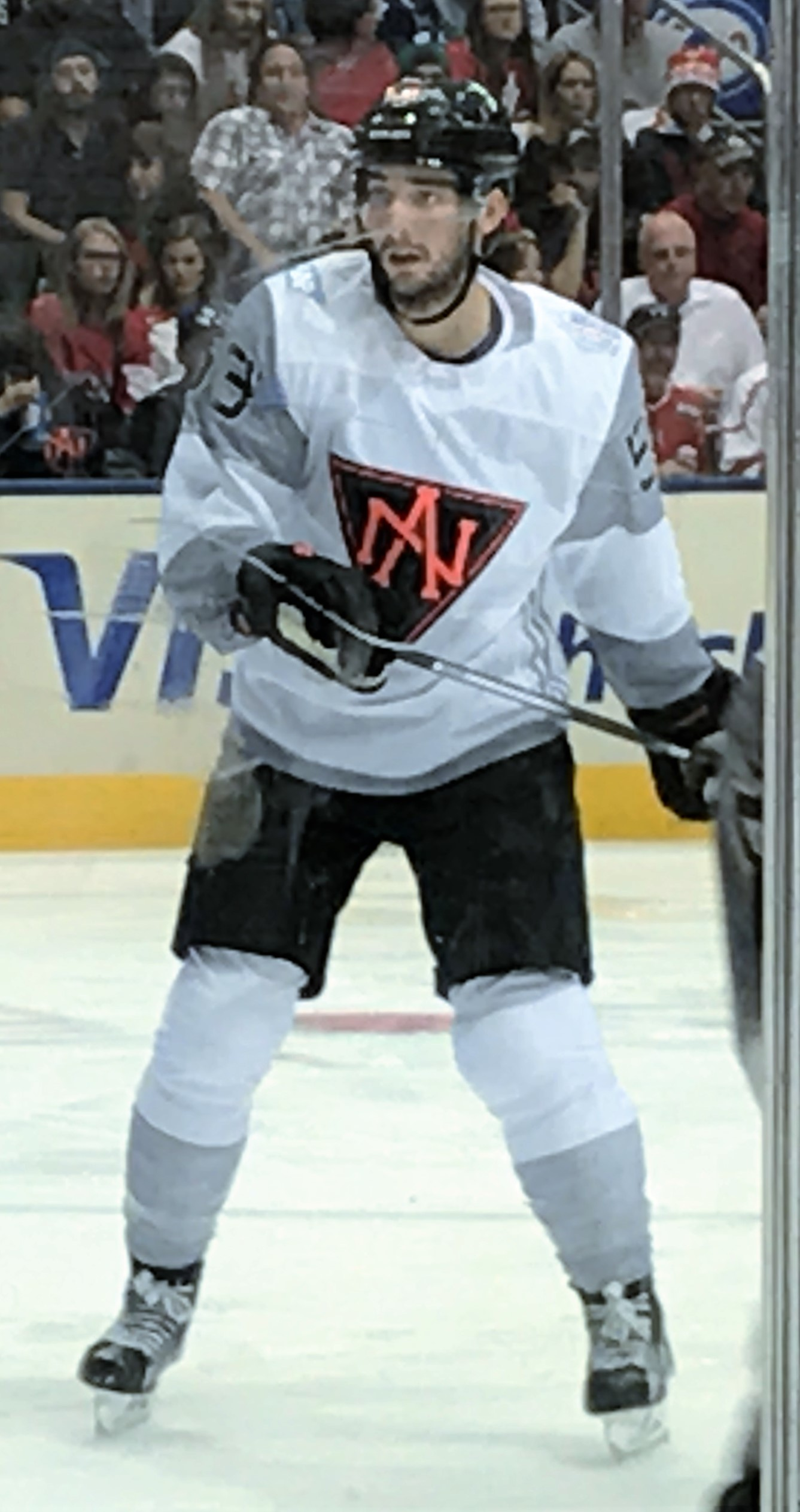
- Gostisbehere with Team North America at the 2016 World Cup of Hockey

Medal record

Ice hockey

Representing United States

World Junior Championships
Gold medal – first place	2013 Ufa	

Gostisbehere first represented the United States internationally at the 2013 World Junior Ice Hockey Championships in Ufa, Russia. He was suspended for one game after spearing Matúš Matis in a quarterfinal game against Slovakia. Gostisbehere played sparingly in the semifinal match against Canada, but returned in force for the gold-medal victory over Sweden.

Three years later, Gostisbehere was named to Team North America in the 2016 World Cup of Hockey. He described the team's rallying cry as, "Hey, we can play with these guys." Although Gostisbehere recorded three assists for Team North America in a 4–3 victory over Sweden during the group stage, only the latter team advanced to the semifinal round.

== Player profile ==
Standing only 5 feet 11 inches (1.80 m) and weighing 160 pounds (73 kg), Gostisbehere is smaller than many of his teammates and opponents. Early in his career, Gostisbehere chose to model his style of play after Panthers skater Pavel Bure, who was similarly undersized but used his speed to his advantage against larger players. As a rookie, most of Gostisbehere's success came from his point production, but as his professional hockey career continued, he began to focus less on scoring and more on defense, particularly in power play scenarios. He has remained an offensively-minded defenseman, however, focusing on pushing the pace of the game and shutting down opponents in the offensive zone.

== Personal life ==
Gostisbehere's older sister Felicia was a national figure skater before she suffered a career-ending hip injury at the age of 15. She now works as an emergency room trauma nurse in Fort Myers, Florida. Their cousin, Ugo Gostisbehere, plays professional soccer in France. Gostisbehere proposed to his longtime girlfriend, Gina Valentine, in May 2020. Valentine works as a nurse at the Children's Hospital of Philadelphia, and the couple have three French Bulldogs.

After the Stoneman Douglas High School shooting, Gostisbehere honored his alma mater by wearing an "MSD Strong" decal on his helmet, as well as a Stoneman Douglas baseball cap during interviews. When the Flyers were in Florida for a game against the Panthers, Gostisbehere hosted the Stoneman Douglas ice hockey team, and met with the team separately after the game.

== Career statistics ==
=== Regular season and playoffs ===
			Regular season					Playoffs
Season	Team	League	GP	G	A	Pts	PIM	GP	G	A	Pts	PIM
2009–10	South Kent School	HS-Prep	33	6	27	33		—	—	—	—	—
2010–11	South Kent School	HS-Prep	24	7	29	36	32	—	—	—	—	—
2011–12	Union Dutchmen	ECAC	41	5	17	22	20	—	—	—	—	—
2012–13	Union Dutchmen	ECAC	36	8	18	26	39	—	—	—	—	—
2013–14	Union Dutchmen	ECAC	42	9	25	34	26	—	—	—	—	—
2013–14	Adirondack Phantoms	AHL	2	0	0	0	2	—	—	—	—	—
2014–15	Lehigh Valley Phantoms	AHL	5	0	5	5	0	—	—	—	—	—
2014–15	Philadelphia Flyers	NHL	2	0	0	0	0	—	—	—	—	—
2015–16	Lehigh Valley Phantoms	AHL	14	2	8	10	6	—	—	—	—	—
2015–16	Philadelphia Flyers	NHL	64	17	29	46	24	6	1	1	2	4
2016–17	Philadelphia Flyers	NHL	76	7	32	39	32	—	—	—	—	—
2017–18	Philadelphia Flyers	NHL	78	13	52	65	25	6	1	0	1	4
2018–19	Philadelphia Flyers	NHL	78	9	28	37	22	—	—	—	—	—
2019–20	Philadelphia Flyers	NHL	42	5	7	12	20	5	0	2	2	2
2019–20	Lehigh Valley Phantoms	AHL	2	0	1	1	0	—	—	—	—	—
2020–21	Philadelphia Flyers	NHL	41	9	11	20	6	—	—	—	—	—
2021–22	Arizona Coyotes	NHL	82	14	37	51	26	—	—	—	—	—
2022–23	Arizona Coyotes	NHL	52	10	21	31	28	—	—	—	—	—
2022–23	Carolina Hurricanes	NHL	23	3	7	10	4	15	0	3	3	6
2023–24	Detroit Red Wings	NHL	81	10	46	56	16	—	—	—	—	—
2024–25	Carolina Hurricanes	NHL	70	7	38	45	52	15	3	6	9	4
2025–26	Carolina Hurricanes	NHL	55	13	37	50	22	19	3	9	12	14
NHL totals			744	117	345	462	277	66	8	21	29	34

=== International ===
Year	Team	Event	Result	GP	G	A	Pts	PIM
2013	United States	WJC	1st place, gold medalist(s)	6	1	1	2	25
2016	Team North America	WCH	5th	3	0	4	4	4
Junior totals				6	1	1	2	25
Senior totals				3	0	4	4	4

== Awards and honors ==
Award	Year	Ref
College
All-ECAC Hockey Rookie Team	2011–12	
ECAC Hockey All-Tournament Team	2011–12	
All-ECAC Hockey Second Team	2012–13	
ACHA All-America East Second Team	2012–13	
ECAC Hockey Player of the Year	2013–14	
ECAC Hockey Best Defensive Defenseman	2013–14	
All-ECAC Hockey First Team	2013–14	
ACHA All-America East First Team	2013–14	
NCAA All-Tournament Team	2014	
NCAA Tournament Most Outstanding Player	2014	
NHL
NHL All-Rookie Team	2015–16	
Stanley Cup champion	2026	
Philadelphia Flyers
Barry Ashbee Trophy	2015–16	
Barry Ashbee Trophy	2017–18	
Gene Hart Memorial Award	2015–16	

Awards and achievements
Preceded by Zach Davies	ECAC Hockey Best Defensive Defenseman; 2013–14; With: Dennis Robertson	Succeeded by Rob O'Gara
Preceded by Eric Hartzell	ECAC Hockey Player of the Year; 2013–14; With: Greg Carey	Succeeded by Jimmy Vesey
Preceded by Andrew Miller	NCAA Tournament Most Outstanding Player; 2014	Succeeded by Jon Gillies
