= Colton Parayko =

Canadian ice hockey player (born 1993)

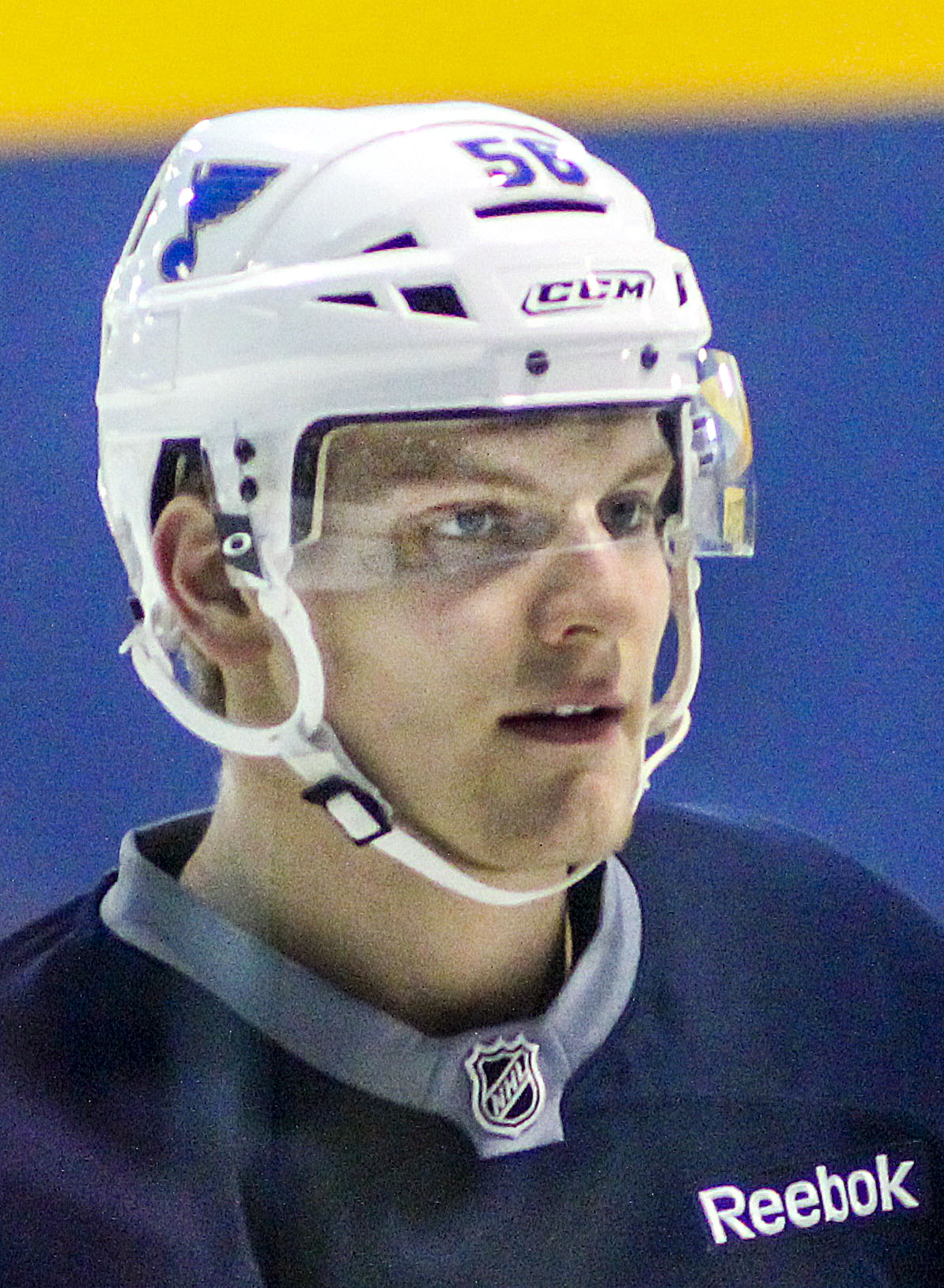
- Parayko with the St. Louis Blues in 2015
- Born: May 12, 1993 (age 33) St. Albert, Alberta, Canada.
- Height: 6 ft 6 in (198 cm)
- Weight: 230 lb (104 kg; 16 st 6 lb)
- Position: Defence
- Shoots: Right
- NHL team: St. Louis Blues
- National team: Canada
- NHL draft: 86th overall, 2012; St. Louis Blues
- Playing career: 2015–present

Colton Wyatt Parayko (born May 12, 1993) is a Canadian professional ice hockey player who is a defenceman and alternate captain for the St. Louis Blues of the National Hockey League (NHL). Growing up in St. Albert, Alberta, Parayko played minor ice hockey with the St. Albert Flyers and Fort McMurray Oil Barons before earning a scholarship to the University of Alaska Fairbanks. He went overlooked and undrafted in his first year of NHL eligibility before being selected 86th overall as a 19-year-old in the 2012 NHL entry draft by the St. Louis Blues. Following the draft, Parayko played three seasons with the Alaska Nanooks, earning All-Western Collegiate Hockey Association (WCHA) First Team and West Second-Team All-American honors. He concluded his collegiate career in 2015 to begin his professional career within the Blues organization.

Parayko was immediately reassigned to the Blues' American Hockey League affiliate, the Chicago Wolves, to play out the remainder of the 2014–15 season before finally making his NHL debut the following season. Parayko won the Stanley Cup with the Blues in 2019. Parayko competed for Team North America at the 2016 World Cup of Hockey and Team Canada at the 2017 IIHF World Championship.

== Early life ==
Parayko was born on May 12, 1993, in St. Albert, Alberta, to Ukrainian Canadians Tom and Karen Parayko with three siblings, Kendra, Bryce, and Kennedy. Besides hockey, Parayko and his brother Bryce competed in motocross dirt bikes circuits throughout Alberta.

== Playing career ==
=== Youth ===
Growing up, Parayko spent his youth hockey career in his hometown of St. Albert, Alberta while attending Paul Kane High School. After going unselected in the 2008 Western Hockey League (WHL) draft, he signed a contract with the Midget AAA St. Albert Flyers. Following his first season with the Flyers, Parayko joined the St. Albert Crusaders U18 AA where he recorded 13 points in 33 games. The Crusaders finished second in the league and reached the playoff finals against the KC Colts U18 AA. At the conclusion of the 2009–10 season, he experienced a six-inch growth spurt and signed with the Fort McMurray Oil Barons of the Alberta Junior Hockey League (AJHL). As he was not invited to their initial training camp, Parayko had to spend $60 to try out for the Oil Barons and become their seventh defenceman.

While competing for the Oil Barons, Parayko came to the attention of National Hockey League (NHL) scout Marshall Davidson. After seeing Parayko play only 20-second shifts during a game, he approached the healthy scratches to ask why. When they responded that he was playing with a cracked rib, Davidson continued to watch him play at various arenas before recommending the St. Louis Blues draft him. After the Oil Barons were defeated by the Spruce Grove Saints in the 2011 AJHL Finals, Alaska Nanooks men's ice hockey coach Dallas Ferguson approached Parayko and recruited him for the University of Alaska Fairbanks. Although he had also been offered an opportunity in the WHL, Parayko committed to Alaska that summer.

In his first year of NHL eligibility, Parayko went unselected in the 2011 NHL entry draft and failed to make the NHL Central Scouting Bureau's prospect list the following year. In spite of this, the St. Louis Blues drafted him in the third round at the age of 19. Parayko was not expecting to be drafted and figured he would end up either in finance or a pilot like his brother.

=== College ===
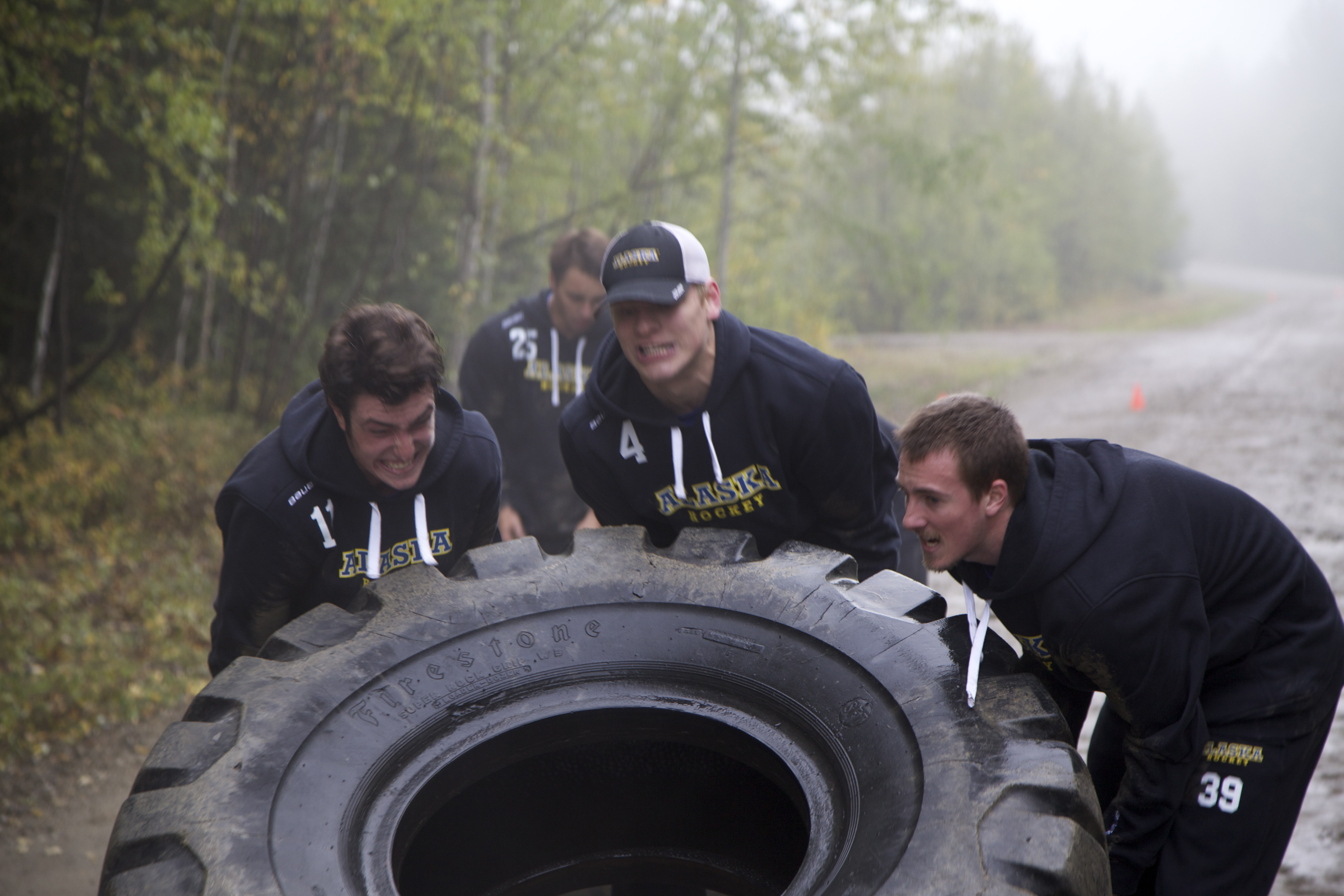
Alec Hajdukovich, Parayko (middle), and John Keeney work together to flip a large tire as part of a leadership challenge while at University of Alaska Fairbanks.

Parayko played collegiate hockey for the University of Alaska Fairbanks in the NCAA Men's Division I Central Collegiate Hockey Association (CCHA) beginning in the 2012–2013 season. In his freshman season, Parayko recorded his first collegiate goal in a 3–3 tie against the Air Force Falcons on October 12, 2012. He ended the year with four goals and 13 assists for 17 points.

In his sophomore year with the Nanooks ice hockey team, Parayko's outstanding play was rewarded with an appointment to alternate captain. In this role, he was one of only five players to play in all 34 games for the team and recorded six goals and 17 assists for 23 points. He placed second in the CCHA in points for defencemen and sixth overall in assists. As a result, he was selected to the AHCA West Second-Team All-American. He was also awarded the Central Collegiate Hockey Association Defensive Player of the Year award and named to the All-CCHA First Team.

In his final season with the team, Parayko was appointed team captain alongside forwards Garrick Perry and Tyler Morley as alternate captains. He recorded 23 points over 34 games to rank third on the team and was once again named to the All-American Second Team by the American Hockey Coaches Association and CCM. Parayko also received the Central Collegiate Hockey Association Defensive Player of the Year and was selected for their All-CCHA First Team alongside teammate Tyler Morley for the second time. From the team, he received the Shawn Chambers Top Defenseman, Rick Pitta Most Dedicated Player, the Pump House Team Player Award, and the Fans' Choice Award,

=== Professional ===
At the completion of his junior season with the Nanooks, Parayko ended his collegiate career by signing a two-year, entry-level contract with the St. Louis Blues. He was subsequently reassigned to Blues' American Hockey League (AHL) affiliate, the Chicago Wolves, to finish the 2014–15 season on March 12, 2015. He made his AHL debut a few days later on March 15 and recorded a total of three goals and two assists over his first 11 professional games. Parayko ended the season with one more goal for a total of 7 points over 17 games.

Upon concluding his AHL stint, Parayko stayed in the St. Louis area during the offseason to get ready for the Blues' 2015 training camp. As a result of his training and play, Parayko impressed at the Blues' training camp and made their opening night roster for the 2015–16 season. He earned praise from head coach Ken Hitchcock, who said "he's got poise with the puck and for a big man, he's got foot speed...He has great composure and he's getting better every day." In his third career NHL game on October 14, 2015, he recorded his first career NHL goals, including the game winner, in a 4–3 victory over the Calgary Flames. This resulted in him becoming the first Blues rookie defenceman to record a multi-goal performance since 2000–01. From there, Parayko continued to dominate on the ice and recorded five goals in his first 14 games, while continuing to work alongside the coaching staff. After games, he would review every video of his shift to critique and improve on his skating.

Although Parayko spent the entirety of the season with the Blues, minor injuries would keep him out of the lineup for a few days. His first lower body injury came on November 16 during a game against the Winnipeg Jets, which kept him out for one game. His second injury occurred during a game against the New York Islanders on December 5. Parayko fell awkwardly on his right leg and was assisted to the Blues' dressing room, only to return three minutes later. He finished the game with 16:45 minutes of ice time and was not made available for comment afterwards. Parayko appeared in 79 regular season games for the Blues, ranking second amongst rookie defencemen in goals, assists, and points. He also led all rookies with a plus-28 rating, which ranked fifth overall in the league and set a franchise rookie record. As a result of his dominating season, Parayko was selected for the NHL All-Rookie Team and ranked eighth in Calder Memorial Trophy voting as rookie of the year. The Blues qualified for the 2016 Stanley Cup playoffs where they faced off against the Chicago Blackhawks in the first round, the Dallas Stars in the Western Conference second round, and the San Jose Sharks in the conference finals. During the first round, Parayko led the Blues over the Blackhawks by becoming the first defenceman in franchise history to score in a game 7. After beating the Stars in seven games, the Blues fell to the Sharks in six games with a 4–2 series finale.

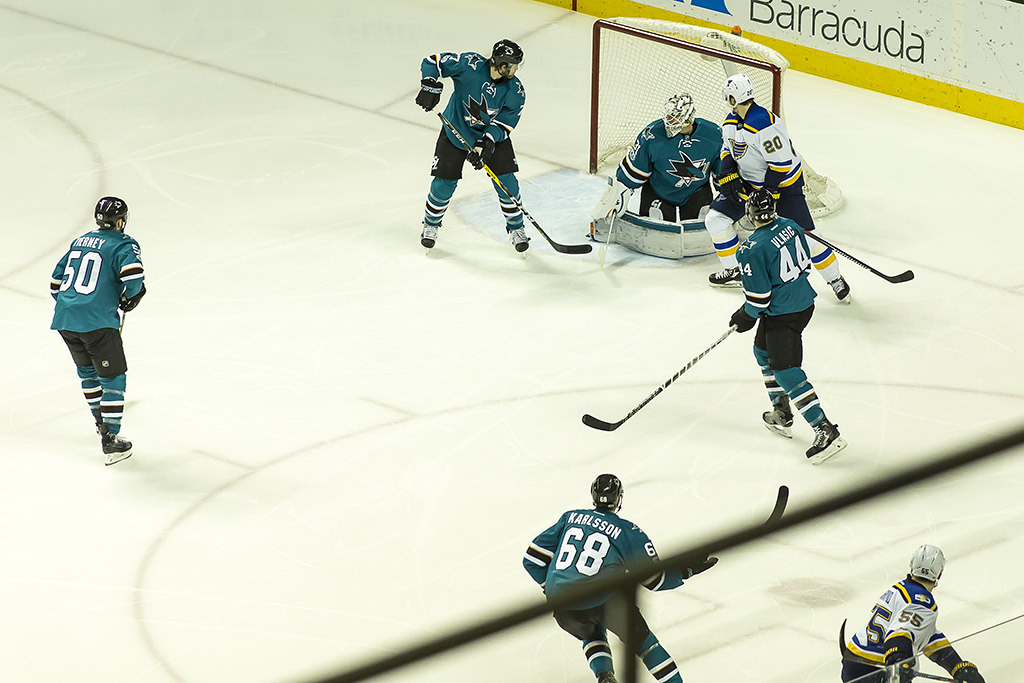
Parayko (far bottom right) scoring a power-play goal during a game against the San Jose Sharks

During the offseason, Parayko competed in the 2016 World Cup of Hockey and graduated from the University of Alaska Fairbanks with a degree in Business Administration on August 12, 2016. When speaking about earning his degree, Parayko said, "Hockey can only last so long. I'm going to have to work after hockey... Having a degree in my back pocket is obviously a bonus." As Team North America failed to medal, he returned to the Blues for their 2016 training camp and was again named to their opening night roster. Picking up on the success of his previous season, Parayko tied the NHL's longest active point streak with five games and ranked fourth among all defencemen in assists by December. He ended the season with a career-high 35 points over 81 games and re-signed a five-year, $27.5 million contract worth $5.5 million annually to stay with the Blues.

Entering his third season with the Blues, expectations were high on Parayko to improve on his previous season. He began the 2017–18 season on pace to produce more goals, points, power-play points and play more minutes than the previous season. After captain Alex Pietrangelo suffered a foot injury during a game against the Detroit Red Wings, Parayko was given an A on his jersey to symbolize his temporary appointment to alternate captain. As more injuries fell on the Blues during the second half of the season, Parayko played on the second defensive pairing with newcomer Vince Dunn for 18 games. After losing their top goal-scorer Vladimir Tarasenko during a game against the Colorado Avalanche, they were mathematically eliminated from the playoffs. He ended the season with 35 points in 82 games and 13 penalty minutes.

Parayko began the 2018–19 season on a pairing with Jay Bouwmeester to lead the Blues' shutdown line, but would also play with Marco Scandella once he was acquired from the Montreal Canadiens. While with Bouwmeester, Parayko was 37th in the league for time on ice at 22 minutes 47 seconds, but his time jumped to 25:07 in the postseason. Together, they were often referred to as a "car wash on ice" as they were "tidy car washers against the opponents' top horses." After Pietrangelo suffered a hand injury on November 30, 2018, Parayko was given the responsibility by the coaching staff to replace him on the top defensive pairing. As the team continued to drop in the standings and reach 28th-place, Parayko was often considered prime trade bait as the trade deadline neared. He remained untraded after the deadline and helped lead the Blues to the 2019 Stanley Cup Final against the Boston Bruins by recording two goals and 10 assists in 26 games during the postseason. With his assistance, the team won the 2019 Stanley Cup for the first time in their 52-year franchise history.

Following their championship year, Parayko returned to the Blues for the 2019–20 season. On January 14, 2020, Parayko was placed on long-term injured reserve after suffering an upper-body injury a few days earlier. At the time of his injury, Parayko had recorded 13 points and eight penalty minutes over 42 games. He was activated off injured reserve on January 27, 2020, after missing seven games. Upon returning to the lineup, Parayko began to be paired with Scandella on a more regular basis and they recorded six points over their first three games together. By the time the league suspended play due to the COVID-19 pandemic, Parayko recorded 28 points in 64 games. When the Blues returned to play in July, Parayko missed the first day of training camp and was presumed to have contracted COVID-19. The team ended up with the 4th seed in the West after going winless in the round-robin portion of the Stanley Cup Qualifiers, they lost to the Vancouver Canucks during Round 1.

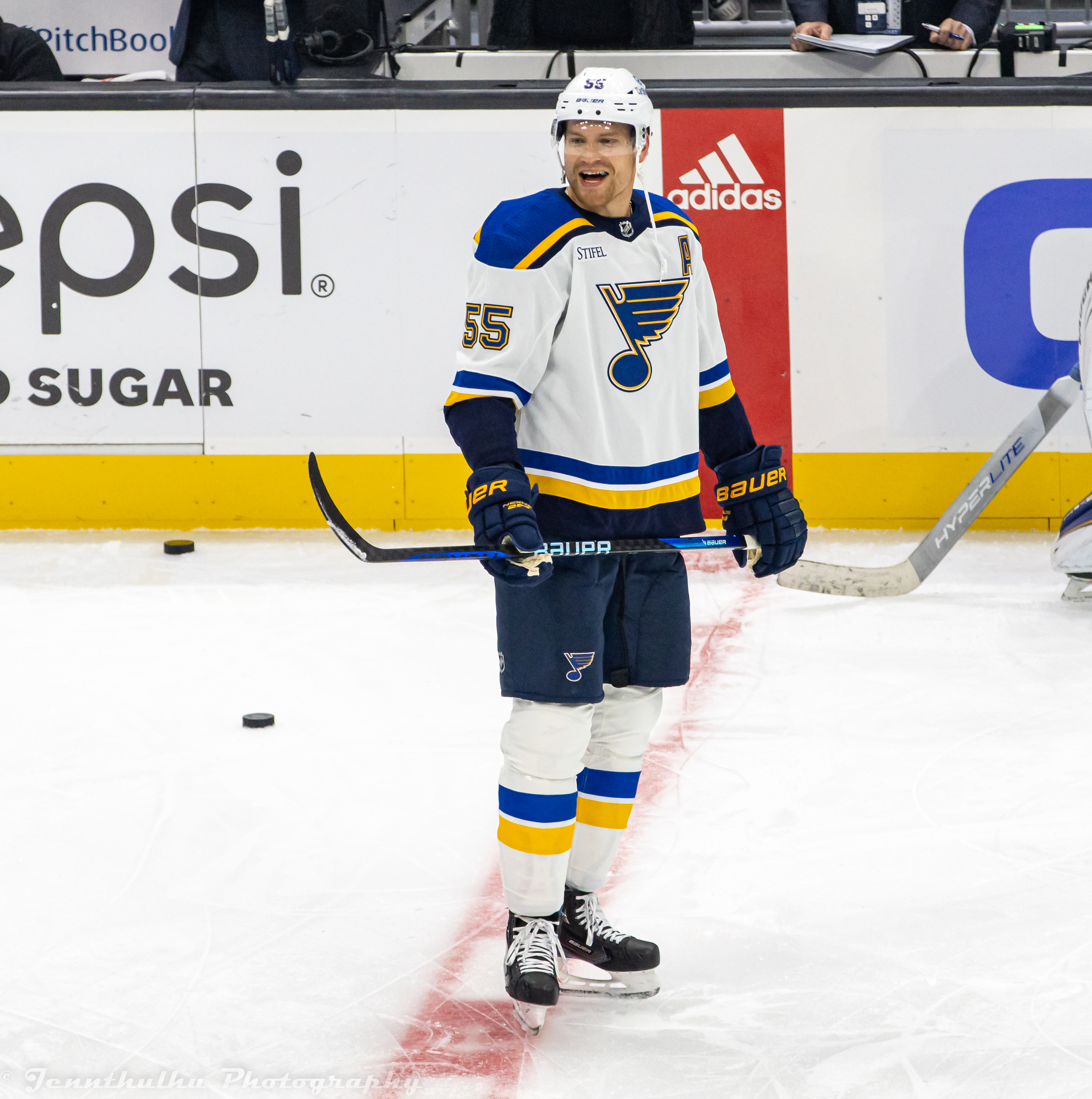
Parayko with the Blues in 2022

Parayko suffered another upper-body injury after playing the first 15 games of the season and recording one goal and seven assists. The injury occurred on February 15 against the Arizona Coyotes. After missing 21 games, he returned to the Blues lineup on April 5 for a game against the Vegas Golden Knights. As a result of his injury-riddled season, Parayko tallied two goals and 10 assists through 32 regular season games. On September 1, 2021, Parayko signed an eight-year, $52 million contract extension with the Blues.

On March 4, 2026, shortly prior to the 2026 NHL trade deadline, reports emerged that the Blues had reached an agreement to trade Parayko to the Buffalo Sabres. However, Parayko refused to waive his no-trade clause, causing the trade to fall through.

== International play ==
Medal record

Ice hockey

Representing Canada

Olympic Games
Silver medal – second place	2026 Milano Cortina	

World Championship
Silver medal – second place	2017 Germany/France	

4 Nations Face-Off
Winner	2025 Canada/United States	

As a citizen of Canada, Parayko has competed for his country on numerous occasions. He first played for Team Canada West in the Junior Club World Cup and 2011 World Junior A Challenge, where he helped lead Canada to a gold medal.

Parayko's second international tournament came following his dominating rookie season. On May 27, 2016, Parayko was chosen to be a part of Team North America, a selection of the top American and Canadian players aged 23 and under, at the 2016 World Cup of Hockey in Toronto. He made his debut on September 15, 2016, against Team Finland where he recorded two assists and earned the First Star of the Game. He ended the tournament by playing in three games and recording three assists.

After the Blues were eliminated in the second round of the 2017 Stanley Cup playoffs, Parayko joined Canada at the 2017 World Championship, where he registered seven points (three goals and four assists) and was named an All-Star. The Canadians would lose to Sweden in a shootout in the finals.

Seven years later, with the Blues missing qualification to the 2024 Stanley Cup playoffs, Parayko rejoined Team Canada for the 2024 IIHF World Championship.

On December 31, 2025, he was named to Canada's roster to compete at the 2026 Winter Olympics. Colton Parayko and the Canadian Men's Ice Hockey team won Silver in Ice Hockey at the 2026 Winter Olympics.

== Career statistics ==
=== Regular season and playoffs ===
			Regular season					Playoffs
Season	Team	League	GP	G	A	Pts	PIM	GP	G	A	Pts	PIM
2010–11	Fort McMurray Oil Barons	AJHL	42	3	9	12	12	12	2	1	3	2
2011–12	Fort McMurray Oil Barons	AJHL	53	9	33	42	65	21	3	9	12	14
2012–13	University of Alaska Fairbanks	CCHA	33	4	13	17	23	—	—	—	—	—
2013–14	University of Alaska Fairbanks	WCHA	37	7	19	26	16	—	—	—	—	—
2014–15	University of Alaska Fairbanks	WCHA	34	6	17	23	16	—	—	—	—	—
2014–15	Chicago Wolves	AHL	17	4	3	7	6	5	0	0	0	6
2015–16	St. Louis Blues	NHL	79	9	24	33	29	20	2	5	7	4
2016–17	St. Louis Blues	NHL	81	4	31	35	32	11	2	3	5	2
2017–18	St. Louis Blues	NHL	82	6	29	35	13	—	—	—	—	—
2018–19	St. Louis Blues	NHL	80	10	18	28	15	26	2	10	12	10
2019–20	St. Louis Blues	NHL	64	10	18	28	16	9	2	0	2	2
2020–21	St. Louis Blues	NHL	32	2	10	12	14	4	0	1	1	0
2021–22	St. Louis Blues	NHL	80	6	29	35	18	12	2	3	5	6
2022–23	St. Louis Blues	NHL	79	4	23	27	30	—	—	—	—	—
2023–24	St. Louis Blues	NHL	82	10	16	26	23	—	—	—	—	—
2024–25	St. Louis Blues	NHL	64	16	20	36	8	7	1	5	6	6
2025–26	St. Louis Blues	NHL	77	4	14	18	23	—	—	—	—	—
NHL totals			800	81	232	313	221	89	11	27	38	30

=== International ===
Year	Team	Event	Result	GP	G	A	Pts	PIM
2016	Team North America	WCH	5th	3	0	3	3	2
2017	Canada	WC	2nd place, silver medalist(s)	6	3	4	7	0
2018	Canada	WC	4th	10	4	4	8	6
2024	Canada	WC	4th	10	0	4	4	2
2025	Canada	4NF	1st place, gold medalist(s)	4	0	0	0	5
2026	Canada	OG	2nd place, silver medalist(s)	6	0	0	0	0
Senior totals				39	7	15	22	15

== Awards and honours ==
Award	Year	Ref
College
Defensive Player of the Year	2014, 2015	
All-WCHA First Team	2014, 2015	
AHCA West Second-Team All-American	2014, 2015	
NHL
NHL All-Rookie Team	2016	
Stanley Cup champion	2019	
International
World Championship All-Star Team	2017	

Awards and achievements
Preceded by Nick Jensen	WCHA Defensive Player of the Year; 2013–14, 2014–15	Succeeded by Casey Nelson
