= List of Stanley Cup Final officials =

Before the Stanley Cup playoffs, a list of forty on-ice officials are named to work: Twenty referees and twenty linesmen. They are paired up in each round, traveling and working together between the series. Usually, they are never assigned to work two games between two teams they have already seen. This does not apply if a series reaches seven games, or at any point in time beginning in the third round. If a game seven is reached, those who have been assigned to work in the next round will call the series-deciding game. If at any time a referee or linesman is injured or unable to work, there is a standby official; he is there in the event that one of the officials cannot continue in the game.

Throughout the playoffs, the list of officials is minimized.

- During the second round, twenty-four officials (twelve referees and twelve linesmen) work games.
- During the third round, sixteen officials (eight referees and eight linesmen) work games.

In the final round of cuts, the list is reduced to ten officials: Five referees and five linesmen. They are named as Stanley Cup Finals officials. They are no longer in pairs; they will rotate so that all officials are involved in the series. If the Stanley Cup Final reaches a game seven, the top two referees and two linesmen will be assigned to officiate the game.

== 2022―present ==
=== 2023 Stanley Cup Final ===
Referees

- Steve Kozari
- Wes McCauley
- Dan O'Rourke
- Chris Rooney
- Kelly Sutherland

Linesmen

- Steve Barton
- Scott Cherrey
- Brad Kovachik
- Kiel Murchison
- Jonny Murray

=== 2022 Stanley Cup Final ===
Referees

- Gord Dwyer
- Jean Hebert
- Wes McCauley
- Chris Rooney
- Kelly Sutherland

Linesmen

- Steve Barton
- Ryan Daisy
- Brad Kovachik
- Kiel Murchison
- Jonny Murray

== 2021 ==
In 2021, the NHL broke teams up into new divisions: Three in the United States, and one in Canada. The referees and linesmen were semi-restricted from crossing the border throughout the regular season, only being allowed to move between the two countries either when they were re-assigned to work games, or when the semifinals began (and including the final).

Referees

- Francis Charron
- Gord Dwyer
- Eric Furlatt
- Dan O'Rourke
- Kelly Sutherland

Linesmen

- David Brisebois
- Scott Cherrey
- Michel Cormier
- Kiel Murchison
- Jonny Murray

== 2020 ==
In 2020, the playoffs looked a little different. Referees and linesmen were placed in two separate bubbles for the qualifier round and the first two rounds (Toronto for the Eastern Conference and Edmonton for the Western Conference). The sixteen remaining officials would come together in Edmonton when there were four teams remaining in the playoffs.

As part of the NHLOA's recent collective bargaining agreement, 2020 was the first year they would name five referees and five linesmen to the Cup Final. Next to each official is the bubble in which they started the playoffs in.

Referees

- Francis Charron (Toronto)
- Steve Kozari (Edmonton)
- Wes McCauley (Toronto)
- Dan O'Rourke (Edmonton)
- Kelly Sutherland (Edmonton)

Linesmen

- Derek Amell (Toronto)
- Steve Barton (Toronto)
- Scott Cherrey (Edmonton)
- Brad Kovachik (Edmonton)
- Matt MacPherson (Toronto)

== 2019 ==
Before the 2019 Stanley Cup Final, the NHL assigned five referees and four linesmen to the series: Something they hadn't done since 2001. This was done, possibly because one of the referees (Wes McCauley) had sustained a leg injury during game six of the Western Conference Final and left the game. Even though he was named to work the Finals, he did not work in the seven-game series.

Referees

- Gord Dwyer
- Steve Kozari
- Wes McCauley
- Chris Rooney
- Kelly Sutherland

Linesmen

- Derek Amell
- Scott Cherrey
- Greg Devorski
- Pierre Racicot

== 2002-2018 ==
Beginning with the 2002 Stanley Cup Final, the NHL assigned two referees and two linesmen for each game. A total of eight on-ice officials are named: Four referees and four linesmen.

=== 2018 Stanley Cup Final ===
Referees

- Marc Joannette
- Wes McCauley
- Chris Rooney
- Kelly Sutherland

Linesmen

- Derek Amell
- Greg Devorski
- Matt MacPherson
- Jonny Murray

=== 2017 Stanley Cup Final ===
Referees

- Wes McCauley
- Brad Meier
- Dan O'Halloran
- Kevin Pollock

Linesmen

- Scott Cherrey
- Shane Heyer
- Brad Kovachik
- Brian Murphy

=== 2016 Stanley Cup Final ===
Referees

- Wes McCauley
- Dan O'Halloran
- Dan O'Rourke
- Kelly Sutherland

Linesmen

- Derek Amell
- Brian Murphy
- Jonny Murray
- Pierre Racicot

=== 2015 Stanley Cup Final ===
Referees

- Wes McCauley
- Dan O'Halloran
- Kevin Pollock
- Kelly Sutherland

Linesmen

- Derek Amell
- Shane Heyer
- Brian Murphy
- Pierre Racicot

=== 2014 Stanley Cup Final ===
Referees

- Wes McCauley
- Steve Kozari
- Dan O'Halloran
- Brad Watson

Linesmen

- Derek Amell
- Scott Driscoll
- Shane Heyer
- Brad Kovachik

=== 2013 Stanley Cup Final ===
Referees

- Wes McCauley
- Dan O'Halloran
- Chris Rooney
- Brad Watson

Linesmen

- Shane Heyer
- Brian Murphy
- Pierre Racicot
- Jay Sharrers

=== 2012 Stanley Cup Final ===
Referees

- Dan O'Halloran
- Dan O'Rourke
- Chris Rooney
- Brad Watson

Linesmen

- Derek Amell
- Jean Morin
- Jonny Murray
- Pierre Racicot

=== 2011 Stanley Cup Final ===
Referees

- Dan O'Halloran
- Dan O'Rourke
- Kelly Sutherland
- Stephen Walkom

Linesmen

- Steve Miller
- Jean Morin
- Pierre Racicot
- Jay Sharrers

=== 2010 Stanley Cup Final ===
Referees

- Bill McCreary
- Dan O'Halloran
- Kelly Sutherland
- Stephen Walkom

Linesmen

- Greg Devorski
- Steve Miller
- Jean Morin
- Pierre Racicot

=== 2009 Stanley Cup Final ===
Referees

- Paul Devorski
- Marc Joannette
- Dennis LaRue
- Bill McCreary

Linesmen

- Derek Amell
- Steve Miller
- Jean Morin
- Pierre Racicot

=== 2008 Stanley Cup Final ===
Referees

- Paul Devorski
- Marc Joannette
- Dan O'Halloran
- Brad Watson

Linesmen

- Shane Heyer
- Jean Morin
- Pierre Racicot
- Jay Sharrers

=== 2007 Stanley Cup Final ===
Referees

- Paul Devorski
- Bill McCreary
- Dan O'Halloran
- Brad Watson

Linesmen

- Scott Driscoll
- Shane Heyer
- Jean Morin
- Jay Sharrers

=== 2006 Stanley Cup Final ===
Referees

- Paul Devorski
- Bill McCreary
- Michael McGeough
- Brad Watson

Linesmen

- Greg Devorski
- Jean Morin
- Pierre Racicot
- Jay Sharrers

=== 2004 Stanley Cup Final ===
Referees

- Kerry Fraser
- Bill McCreary
- Stephen Walkom
- Brad Watson

Linesmen

- Scott Driscoll
- Brian Murphy
- Ray Scapinello
- Mark Wheler

=== 2003 Stanley Cup Final ===
Referees

- Paul Devorski
- Dan Marouelli
- Bill McCreary
- Brad Watson

Linesmen

- Brad Lazarowich
- Brian Murphy
- Tim Nowak
- Mark Wheler

=== 2002 Stanley Cup Finals ===
Referees

- Paul Devorski
- Don Koharski
- Bill McCreary
- Stephen Walkom

Linesmen

- Brad Lazarowich
- Jean Morin
- Brian Murphy
- Dan Schachte

== 1999-2001 ==
Between the 1999 and 2001 playoff seasons, the National Hockey League implemented a two referee, two linesman system. Five referees and four linesmen were named to work in the finals.

=== 2001 Stanley Cup Finals ===
Referees

- Paul Devorski
- Kerry Fraser
- Dan Marouelli
- Bill McCreary
- Rob Shick

Linesmen

- Kevin Collins
- Brad Lazarowich
- Dan Schachte
- Mark Wheler

=== 2000 Stanley Cup Final ===
Referees

- Kerry Fraser
- Terry Gregson
- Don Koharski
- Dan Marouelli
- Bill McCreary

Linesmen

- Gord Broseker
- Ray Scapinello
- Dan Schachte
- Jay Sharrers

=== 1999 Stanley Cup Finals ===
Referees

- Kerry Fraser
- Terry Gregson
- Don Koharski
- Dan Marouelli
- Bill McCreary

Linesmen

- Gord Broseker
- Kevin Collins
- Ray Scapinello
- Jay Sharrers

== 1979-1998 ==
The National Hockey League used a single referee for each playoff game, with a rotation of three referees for the series. The referee with the highest regular-season performance rating was assigned games one, four, and seven; the second-highest rated referee was assigned games two and five; and the third-highest rated referee was assigned games three and six.

1998

- Terry Gregson
- Don Koharski
- Bill McCreary

1994

- Terry Gregson
- Bill McCreary
- Andy Van Hellemond

1990

- Kerry Fraser
- Don Koharski
- Andy Van Hellemond

1986

- Kerry Fraser
- Don Koharski
- Andy Van Hellemond

1982

- Wally Harris
- Andy Van Hellemond
- Ron Wicks

1997

- Kerry Fraser
- Terry Gregson
- Bill McCreary

1993

- Kerry Fraser
- Terry Gregson
- Andy Van Hellemond

1989

- Kerry Fraser
- Denis Morel
- Andy Van Hellemond

1985

- Kerry Fraser
- Bryan Lewis
- Andy Van Hellemond

1981

- Bryan Lewis
- Dave Newell
- Andy Van Hellemond

1996

- Don Koharski
- Bill McCreary
- Andy Van Hellemond

1992

- Terry Gregson
- Don Koharski
- Andy Van Hellemond

1988

- Don Koharski
- Denis Morel
- Andy Van Hellemond

1984

- Bryan Lewis
- Dave Newell
- Andy Van Hellemond

1980

- Wally Harris
- Bob Myers
- Andy Van Hellemond

1995

- Kerry Fraser
- Terry Gregson
- Bill McCreary

1991

- Kerry Fraser
- Don Koharski
- Andy Van Hellemond

1987

- Don Koharski
- Dave Newell
- Andy Van Hellemond

1983

- Wally Harris
- Bryan Lewis
- Andy Van Hellemond

1979

- Bob Myers
- Dave Newell
- Andy Van Hellemond
