= 2016 World Cup of Hockey =

International ice hockey tournament

Coupe du monde de hockey 2016

Tournament details
- Host country: Canada
- Venue: Air Canada Centre
- Dates: September 17–29, 2016
- Teams: 8

Final positions
- Champions: Canada (2nd title)

Tournament statistics
- Games played: 16
- Goals scored: 79 (4.94 per game)
- Attendance: 265,482 (16,593 per game)
- Scoring leader: (Canada) Sidney Crosby (10 pts)

Awards
- MVP: (Canada) Sidney Crosby

The 2016 World Cup of Hockey (abbreviated WCH2016) was an international ice hockey tournament. It was the third installment of the National Hockey League (NHL)-sanctioned competition, 12 years after the second World Cup of Hockey in 2004. It was held from September 17 to September 29 at Air Canada Centre in Toronto, Ontario. Canada won the championship, defeating Team Europe in the best-of-three final.

== Teams ==
The teams were officially announced on September 10, 2015, by the International Ice Hockey Federation. The teams were:

- Canada (24-and-over players) – host
- Czech Republic
- Finland
- Russia
- Sweden
- United States (24-and-over players)
- (Austria) (Denmark) (France) (Germany) (Norway) (Slovakia) (Slovenia) (Switzerland) Europe (Players from European nations not already represented in the tournament.)
- (Canada) (United States) North America (23-and-under players)

=== 2015 IIHF Rankings ===
1. Canada
2. Russia
3. Sweden
4. Finland
5. United States
6. Czech Republic

Europe (unranked)
North America (unranked)

=== National anthems ===
The national anthem for each team playing was played before the start of each game. However, there were two exceptions: no anthem was played for Team Europe because of the team's multiple national representatives, while both "The Star-Spangled Banner" and "O Canada" were played before games Team North America played. Team Europe players wore badges with their respective nations' flags on their jerseys.

== Rosters ==
Each team's roster was limited to twenty skaters (forwards and defencemen) and three goaltenders. All eight participating teams submitted their initial roster of sixteen players on March 2, 2016.

=== Jerseys ===
Each one of the national teams' players wore a customized jersey manufactured by Adidas.

Jerseys

==== Group A ====
| Czech Republic | Canada | USA | Team Europe |

==== Group B ====
| Finland | Russia | Sweden | Team North America |

== Venue ==
In contrast to previous World Cups, all contests in the 2016 World Cup were held at the same site.

Air Canada Centre
Capacity: 18,819
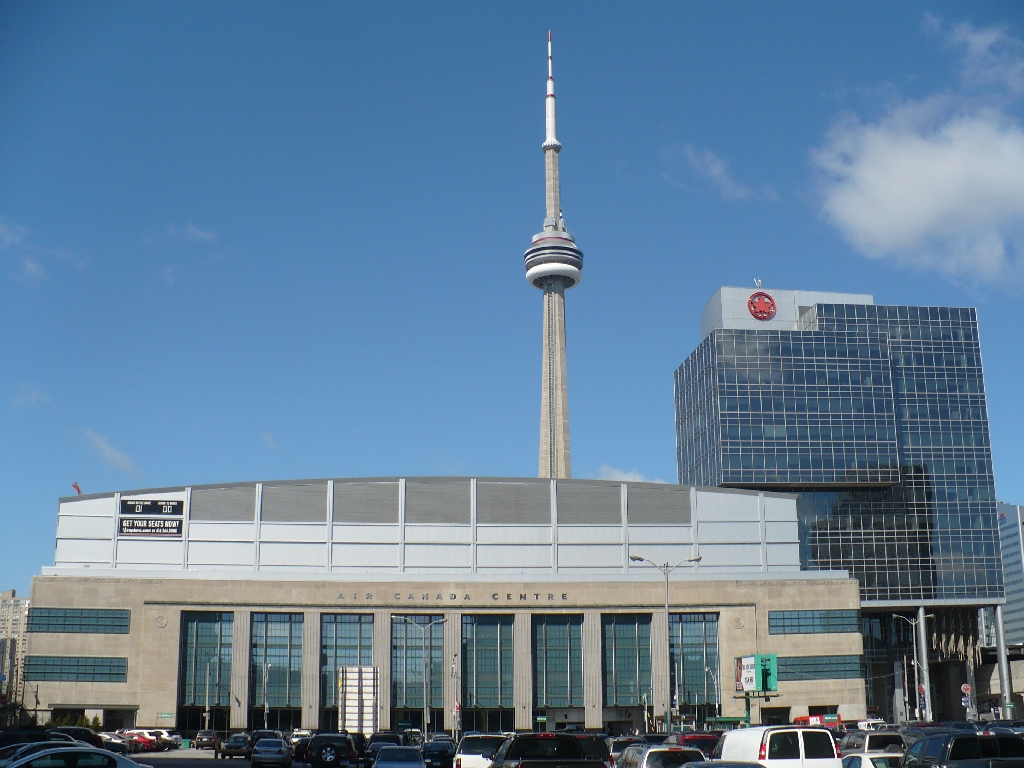
Canada – Toronto

=== Pre-tournament venues ===
Pre-tournament venues

The following venues were used across North America and Europe in the pre-tournament schedule

| Bell Centre Capacity: 21,273 | Canadian Tire Centre Capacity: 18,694 | Consol Energy Center Capacity: 18,387 | Hartwall Arena Capacity: 13,349 | Nationwide Arena Capacity: 18,500 |
| Canada – Montreal | Canada – Ottawa | United States – Pittsburgh | Finland – Helsinki | United States – Columbus |
| O_{2} Arena Capacity: 17,360 | Scandinavium Capacity: 12,044 | Verizon Center Capacity: 18,506 | Vidéotron Centre Capacity: 18,249 | Yubileyny Sports Palace Capacity: 7,012 |
| Czech Republic – Prague | Sweden – Gothenburg | United States – Washington, D.C. | Canada – Quebec City | Russia – Saint Petersburg |

== Pre-tournament games ==
All games are Eastern Daylight Time (UTC−04:00).

Start date: September 8, 2016. Source: National Hockey League

=== In Europe ===
| September 8, 2016; 12:30 PM | Czech Republic | 3–4 (1–1, 0–2, 2–1) | Russia | Yubileyny Sports Palace, Saint Petersburg; Attendance: 6,311 |

Game reference

Petr Mrázek
Goalies
Sergei Bobrovsky
Referees:
Gord Dwyer
Konstantin Olenin
Linesmen:
Michel Cormier
Gleb Lazarev

| Kempný (Sobotka, M. Michálek) – 3:54 | 1–0 |
| | 1–1 | Panarin (Shipachyov, Dadonov) – 18:29 |
| | 1–2 | Tarasenko (Kucherov, Markov) (PP) – 25:22 |
| | 1–3 | Kucherov (Marchenko, Orlov) – 28:38 |
| Hanzal (Hemský, Kempný) (PP) – 46:48 | 2–3 |
| | 2–4 | Dadonov (Panarin, Shipachyov) – 48:48 |
| Plekanec (Polák, Palát) – 57:13 | 3–4 |

12 min
Penalties
10 min
32
Shots
28

| September 8, 2016; 12:00 PM | Sweden | 2–3 OT (0–0, 1–1, 1–1, 0–1) | Finland | Hartwall Arena, Helsinki; Attendance: 11,634 |

Game reference

Jhonas Enroth
Jacob Markström
Goalies
Pekka Rinne
Referees:
Eric Furlatt
Anssi Salonen
Linesmen:
Steve Miller
Sakari Suominen

| | 0–1 | Barkov (PP) – 34:40 |
| Eriksson (Hedman, D. Sedin) – 35:29 | 1–1 |
| Söderberg (Rakell, Landeskog) – 49:42 | 2–1 |
| | 2–2 | Granlund (Koivu) – 55:01 |
| | 2–3 | Määttä (Barkov, Jokinen) – 64:17 |

14 min
Penalties
6 min
20
Shots
24

| September 10, 2016; 10:30 AM | Russia | 1–2 SO (0–0, 0–0, 1–1, 0–0) | Czech Republic | O2 Arena, Prague; Attendance: 13,848 |

Game reference
| Semyon Varlamov | Goalies | Michal Neuvirth | Referees: Gord Dwyer; Jan Hribik; Linesmen: Michel Cormier; Libor Suchanek |
| Kucherov (Kuznetsov, Emelin) – 41:04 / 1–0; / 1–1 / Tomáš Plekanec (Frolík, Polák) – 58:49 | | | Referees: Gord Dwyer; Jan Hribik; Linesmen: Michel Cormier; Libor Suchanek |
| Panarin (miss); Tarasenko; Kucherov (miss) | Shootout | Pastrňák (miss); Voráček; Hemský | Referees: Gord Dwyer; Jan Hribik; Linesmen: Michel Cormier; Libor Suchanek |
| 12 min | Penalties | 12 min | Referees: Gord Dwyer; Jan Hribik; Linesmen: Michel Cormier; Libor Suchanek |
| 21 | Shots | 34 | Referees: Gord Dwyer; Jan Hribik; Linesmen: Michel Cormier; Libor Suchanek |

| September 10, 2016; 12:00 PM | Finland | 3–6 (0–2, 2–1, 1–3) | Sweden | Scandinavium, Gothenburg; Attendance: 12,044 |

Game reference

Tuukka Rask
Goalies
Henrik Lundqvist
Referees:
Eric Furlatt
Tobias Björk
Linesmen:
Henrik Pihlblad
Andreas Malmqvist

| | 0–1 | Eriksson (H. Sedin, Ekman-Larsson) (PP) – 8:56 |
| | 0–2 | Eriksson (D. Sedin, H. Sedin) (PP) – 18:06 |
| | 0–3 | Hörnqvist – 33:55 |
| Ristolainen (Koivu, Donskoi) (PP) – 36:53 | 1–3 |
| Koivu (Donskoi, Ristolainen) – 39:58 | 2–3 |
| | 2–4 | Bäckström (Forsberg, Hörnqvist) – 51:54 |
| | 2–5 | Hörnqvist (Forsberg) – 54:45 |
| Haula (Jokipakka, Lindell) – 56:34 | 3–5 |
| | 3–6 | Forsberg (Hörnqvist) (EN) – 57:53 |

14 min
Penalties
12 min
14
Shots
29

=== In North America ===
| September 8, 2016; 8:00 PM | North America | 4–0 (0–0, 3–0, 1–0) | Europe | Videotron Centre, Quebec City; Attendance: 18,005 |

Game reference

Matt Murray
Goalies
Jaroslav Halák
Referees:
Wes McCauley
Dan O'Halloran
Linesmen:
Brian Murphy
Jonny Murray

| MacKinnon (Ekblad, Gaudreau) (PP) – 23:52 | 1–0 |
| Nugent-Hopkins – 26:22 | 2–0 |
| Gaudreau (Saad, Eichel) – 28:34 | 3–0 |
| MacKinnon (PS) – 52:52 | 4–0 |

4 min
Penalties
2 min
21
Shots
23

| September 9, 2016; 7:00 PM | Canada | 2–4 (0–2, 1–1, 1–1) | United States | Nationwide Arena, Columbus; Attendance: 17,791 |

Game reference

Carey Price
Goalies
Ben Bishop
Jonathan Quick
Referees:
Dan O'Rourke
Kelly Sutherland
Linesmen:
Derek Amell
Shane Heyer

| | 0–1 | Parise (Suter, Stepan) – 16:56 |
| | 0–2 | Kane (Pavelski) – 18:01 |
| Bergeron (Crosby, Marchand) – 33:24 | 1–2 |
| | 1–3 | Pavelski (J. Johnson, Kane) – 35:54 |
| Doughty (Getzlaf, Muzzin) – 45:21 | 2–3 |
| | 2–4 | Stepan (EN) – 58:39 |

10 min
Penalties
21 min
43
Shots
25

| September 10, 2016; 7:00 PM | United States | 2–5 (1–3, 1–1, 0–1) | Canada | Canadian Tire Centre, Ottawa; Attendance: 18,687 |

Game reference

Ben Bishop
Cory Schneider
Goalies
Corey Crawford
Braden Holtby
Referees:
Wes McCauley
Chris Lee
Linesmen:
Brian Murphy
Jonny Murray

| | 0–1 | Couture (Thornton, Perry) (PP) – 11:15 |
| | 0–2 | Tavares (Stamkos, Doughty) (PP) – 13:25 |
| | 0–3 | Bouwmeester (Getzlaf, Perry) – 15:38 |
| McDonagh (Stepan) – 16:35 | 1–3 |
| Carlson (Kane) (PP) – 20:38 | 2–3 |
| | 2–4 | Duchene (Seguin, Doughty) – 32:11 |
| | 2–5 | Tavares (Stamkos, Toews) (PP) – 48:01 |

28 min
Penalties
24 min
23
Shots
38

| September 11, 2016; 6:00 PM | Europe | 4–7 (1–5, 2–0, 1–2) | North America | Bell Centre, Montreal; Attendance: 17,243 |

Game reference

Thomas Greiss
Jaroslav Halák
Goalies
John Gibson
Referees:
Kelly Sutherland
Dan O'Rourke
Linesmen:
Derek Amell
Shane Heyer

| | 0–1 | Ekblad (Matthews, Saad) – 5:20 |
| | 0–2 | Larkin (Trocheck, R. Murray) – 6:27 |
| | 0–3 | Ekblad (MacKinnon) – 7:19 |
| Bellemare (Vanek) – 8:55 | 1–3 |
| | 1–4 | Rielly (Drouin) – 10:22 |
| | 1–5 | Gaudreau (Scheifele) – 15:54 |
| Gáborík (Josi, Bellemare) – 24:50 | 2–5 |
| Gáborík (Nielsen, Zuccarello) – 39:14 | 3–5 |
| Nielsen (Josi, Zuccarello) – 48:17 | 4–5 |
| | 4–6 | Gaudreau (MacKinnon, Parayko) – 51:29 |
| | 4–7 | Larkin (Eichel, Parayko) (EN) – 59:46 |

8 min
Penalties
2 min
33
Shots
33

| September 13, 2016; 7:00 PM | Finland | 2–3 (0–1, 0–2, 2–0) | United States | Verizon Center, Washington, D.C. Attendance: 15,653 |

Game reference

Pekka Rinne
Goalies
Jonathan Quick
Referees:
Dan O'Rourke
Chris Lee
Linesmen:
Shane Heyer
Pierre Racicot

| | 0–1 | Oshie (Kesler, McDonagh) – 1:08 |
| | 0–2 | Kesler (Wheeler, Pacioretty) – 23:37 |
| | 0–3 | Stepan (Carlson) – 25:34 |
| Laine (Vatanen) (PP) – 51:22 | 1–3 |
| Jokinen (Ristolainen) – 55:27 | 2–3 |

4 min
Penalties
10 min
32
Shots
29

| September 14, 2016; 3:30 PM | Czech Republic | 3–2 (1–0, 0–0, 2–2) | North America | CONSOL Energy Center, Pittsburgh |

Game reference

Michal Neuvirth
Petr Mrázek
Goalies
Matt Murray
Connor Hellebuyck
Referees:
Eric Furlatt
Wes McCauley
Linesmen:
Steve Miller
Michel Cormier

| Palát (Hemský, Kempný) (PP) – 10:08 | 1–0 |
| Faksa (Pastrňák, Palát) – 47:16 | 2–0 |
| | 2–1 | Gostisbehere (Larkin, Scheifele) – 48:58 |
| | 2–2 | Matthews (Gaudreau, Gostisbehere) (PP) – 50:57 |
| Plekanec (Hemský, Nakládal) – 51:50 | 3–2 |

16 min
Penalties
8 min
29
Shots
44

| September 14, 2016; 7:00 PM | Sweden | 2–6 (0–1, 1–2, 1–3) | Europe | Verizon Center, Washington, D.C. Attendance: 13,523 |

Game reference

Jacob Markström
Henrik Lundqvist
Goalies
Jaroslav Halák
Referees:
Kelly Sutherland
Chris Lee
Linesmen:
Brian Murphy
Pierre Racicot

| | 0–1 | Draisaitl (Niederreiter, Chára) – 8:53 |
| | 0–2 | Tatar (Gáborík, Streit) (PP) – 22:48 |
| | 0–3 | Draisaitl (Niederreiter, Seidenberg) – 34:31 |
| D. Sedin (Karlsson, Ekman-Larsson) (PP) – 37:07 | 1–3 |
| | 1–4 | Vanek (Zuccarello) – 45:01 |
| | 1–5 | Draisaitl (Josi) – 46:46 |
| Hörnqvist (Hedman, Forsberg) – 55:09 | 2–5 |
| | 2–6 | Kopitar (Tatar, Sekera) (EN) – 59:28 |

4 min
Penalties
6 min
36
Shots
24

| September 14, 2016; 7:30 PM | Canada | 3–2 OT (1–0, 0–0, 1–2, 1–0) | Russia | CONSOL Energy Center, Pittsburgh; Attendance: 12,332 |

Game reference

Carey Price
Goalies
Sergei Bobrovsky
Referees:
Dan O'Halloran
Gord Dwyer
Linesmen:
Derek Amell
Jonny Murray

| Bergeron (Crosby, Burns) – 8:49 | 1–0 |
| | 1–1 | Ovechkin (Panarin, Malkin) (PP) – 43:40 |
| | 1–2 | Panarin (Dadonov, Shipachyov) – 47:25 |
| Tavares (Doughty) – 53:58 | 2–2 |
| Getzlaf (Burns) – 63:29 | 3–2 |

14 min
Penalties
8 min
48
Shots
26

== Group stage ==
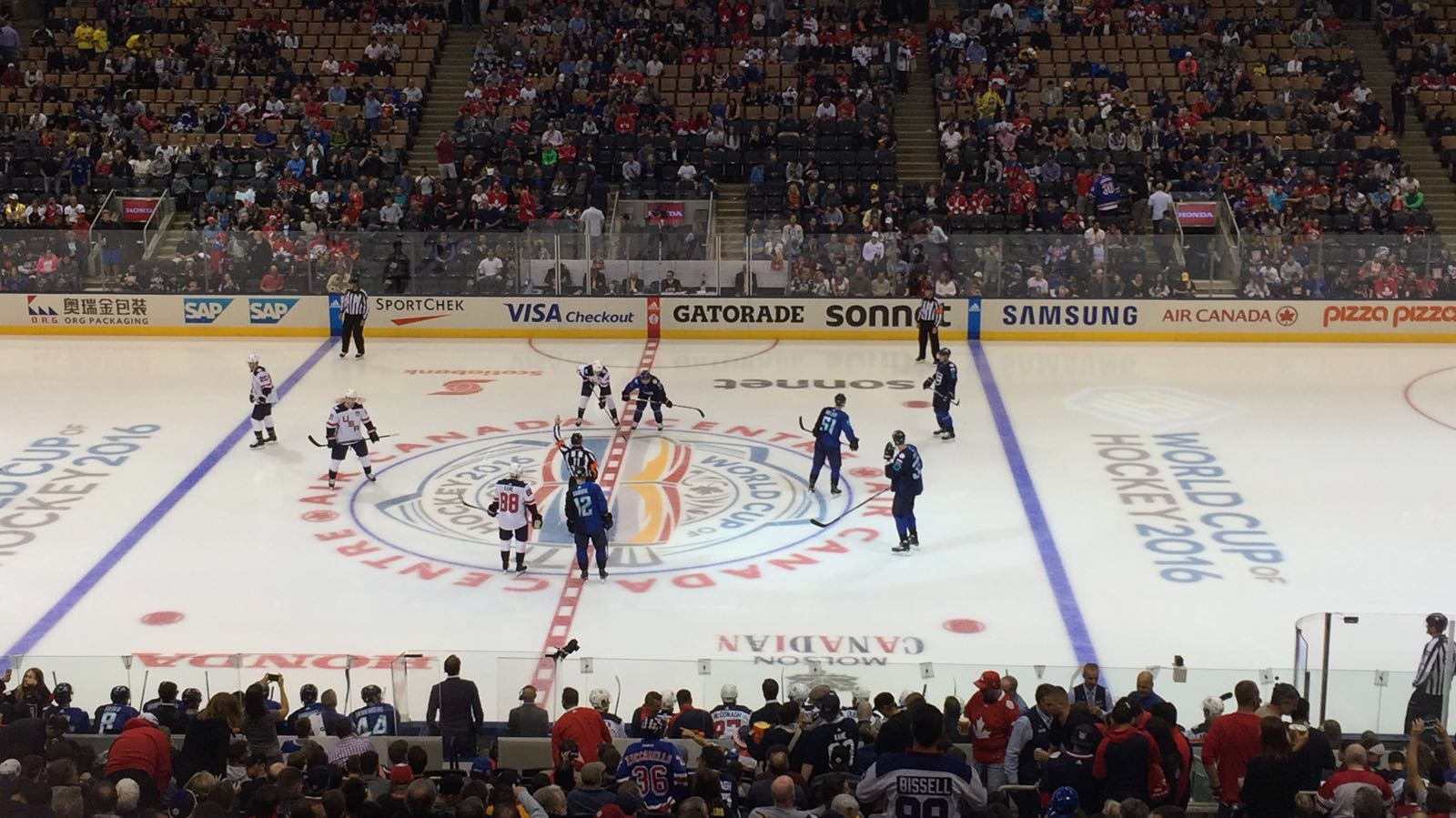
The game between Team Europe and the United States

All games are Eastern Daylight Time (UTC−04:00).

=== Group A ===
| Pos | Team | GP | W | L | OTL | ROW | GF | GA | GD | Pts | Qualification |
|---|---|---|---|---|---|---|---|---|---|---|---|
| 1 | Canada | 3 | 3 | 0 | 0 | 3 | 14 | 3 | +11 | 6 | Advance to knockout stage |
| 2 | Europe | 3 | 2 | 1 | 0 | 2 | 7 | 6 | +1 | 4 | Advance to knockout stage |
| 3 | Czech Republic | 3 | 1 | 1 | 1 | 1 | 6 | 12 | −6 | 3 | |
| 4 | United States | 3 | 0 | 3 | 0 | 0 | 5 | 11 | −6 | 0 | |

Source: National Hockey League
Rules for classification: If two teams tie, then the result of their game breaks the tie. If three or more teams tie, then the following criteria are used: Regulation plus overtime wins (ROW), regulation wins (RW), goal differential (diff), and total goals for (GF).

| September 17, 2016; 3:30 PM | Europe | 3–0 (1–0, 2–0, 0–0) | United States | Air Canada Centre, Toronto; Attendance: 18,959 |

Game reference

Jaroslav Halák
Goalies
Jonathan Quick
Referees:
Gord Dwyer
Kelly Sutherland
Linesmen:
Shane Heyer
Derek Amell

| Gáborík (Nielsen, Zuccarello) – 4:19 | 1–0 |
| Draisaitl (Niederreiter, Rieder) – 24:02 | 2–0 |
| Bellemare (Hansen, Ehrhoff) – 38:32 | 3-0 |

8 min
Penalties
8 min
17
Shots
35

| September 17, 2016; 8:00 PM | Canada | 6–0 (3–0, 2–0, 1–0) | Czech Republic | Air Canada Centre, Toronto; Attendance: 18,978 |

Game reference

Carey Price
Goalies
Michal Neuvirth
Referees:
Eric Furlatt
Chris Lee
Linesmen:
Steve Miller
Michel Cormier

| Crosby (Marchand, Stamkos) – 8:26 | 1–0 |
| Marchand (Burns, Crosby) – 17:08 | 2–0 |
| Bergeron (Marchand) – 19:59 | 3-0 |
| Thornton (Crosby, Duchene) – 27:22 | 4–0 |
| Toews (Getzlaf, Tavares) (PP) – 34:45 | 5–0 |
| Pietrangelo (Doughty, Tavares) (PP) – 52:41 | 6-0 |

12 min
Penalties
6 min
50
Shots
27

| September 19, 2016; 3:00 PM | Czech Republic | 2–3 OT (0–0, 1–1, 1–1) (OT 0–1) | Europe | Air Canada Centre, Toronto; Attendance: 8,574 |

Game reference

Petr Mrázek
Goalies
Jaroslav Halák
Referees:
Eric Furlatt
Kelly Sutherland
Linesmen:
Steve Miller
Brian Murphy

| | 0–1 | 30:05 – Chára (Vanek, Bellemare) |
| Voráček (Jordán, M. Michálek) – 33:28 | 1–1 |
| | 1–2 | 42:17 – Zuccarello (Halák) |
| Hanzal (Sobotka, Hemský) (PP) – 48:31 | 2–2 |
| | 2–3 | 62:06 – Draisaitl (Zuccarello) |

12 min
Penalties
8 min
30
Shots
41

| September 20, 2016; 8:00 PM | Canada | 4–2 (3–1, 1–0, 0–1) | United States | Air Canada Centre, Toronto; Attendance: 19,106 |

Game reference

Carey Price
Goalies
Jonathan Quick
Referees:
Wes McCauley
Eric Furlatt
Linesmen:
Shane Heyer
Michel Cormier

| | 0–1 | 4:22 – McDonagh (Stepan, Kane) |
| Duchene (Vlasic, Thornton) – 5:51 | 1–1 |
| Perry (Couture, Toews) – 6:05 | 2–1 |
| Duchene (Burns) – 12:07 | 3–1 |
| Bergeron (Tavares, Pietrangelo) – 28:50 | 4–1 |
| | 4–2 | 57:28 – Oshie (van Riemsdyk, Pavelski) |

6 min
Penalties
6 min
34
Shots
36

| September 21, 2016; 8:00 PM | Canada | 4–1 (2–0, 1–1, 1–0) | Europe | Air Canada Centre, Toronto; Attendance: 18,926 |

Game reference

Corey Crawford
Goalies
Jaroslav Halák
Referees:
Dan O'Rourke
Dan O'Halloran
Linesmen:
Brian Murphy
Pierre Racicot

| Crosby (Bouwmeester) – 4:01 | 1–0 |
| Toews (Duchene) – 19:05 | 2–0 |
| | 2–1 | 24:38 – Hossa (Kopitar, Ehrhoff) |
| Toews (Couture) – 34:48 | 3–1 |
| Couture (Toews, Vlasic) – 57:33 | 4–1 |

6 min
Penalties
12 min
46
Shots
20

| September 22, 2016; 8:00 PM | Czech Republic | 4–3 (1–1, 3–1, 0–1) | United States | Air Canada Centre, Toronto; Attendance: 11,987 |

Game reference

Petr Mrázek
Goalies
Ben Bishop
Referees:
Gord Dwyer
Chris Lee
Linesmen:
Michel Cormier
Steve Miller

| Z. Michálek (Palát, Hanzal) – 12:44 | 1–0 |
| | 1–1 | 14:28 – Pavelski (Parise, Kane) |
| M. Michálek – 26:03 | 2–1 |
| | 2–2 | 34:13 – Abdelkader (Byfuglien, Suter) |
| Šustr (Voráček, Frolík – 36:50 | 3–2 |
| M. Michálek (Hemský, Polák) – 37:29 | 4–2 |
| | 4–3 | 42:22 – McDonagh (Wheeler, Dubinsky) |

6 min
Penalties
8 min
27
Shots
39

=== Group B ===
| Pos | Team | GP | W | L | OTL | ROW | GF | GA | GD | Pts | Qualification |
|---|---|---|---|---|---|---|---|---|---|---|---|
| 1 | Sweden | 3 | 2 | 0 | 1 | 2 | 7 | 5 | +2 | 5 | Advance to knockout stage |
| 2 | Russia | 3 | 2 | 1 | 0 | 2 | 8 | 5 | +3 | 4 (Note: Head-to-head: Russia 4–3 North America) | Advance to knockout stage |
| 3 | North America | 3 | 2 | 1 | 0 | 2 | 11 | 8 | +3 | 4 | |
| 4 | Finland | 3 | 0 | 3 | 0 | 0 | 1 | 9 | −8 | 0 | |

Source: National Hockey League
Rules for classification: If two teams tie, then the result of their game breaks the tie.
Notes:

| September 18, 2016; 3:00 PM | Russia | 1–2 (0–0, 0–2, 1–0) | Sweden | Air Canada Centre, Toronto; Attendance: 18,966 |

Game reference

Sergei Bobrovsky
Goalies
Jacob Markström
Referees:
Wes McCauley
Dan O'Rourke
Linesmen:
Brian Murphy
Jonny Murray

| | 0–1 | 30:41 – Landeskog (Karlsson, Bäckström) (PP) |
| | 0–2 | 32:52 – Hedman (Hagelin, H.Sedin) |
| Ovechkin (Malkin, Datsyuk) – 59:01 | 1–2 |

8 min
Penalties
6 min
28
Shots
29

| September 18, 2016; 8:00 PM | Finland | 1–4 (0–1, 0–3, 1–0) | North America | Air Canada Centre, Toronto; Attendance: 19,029 |

Game reference

Pekka Rinne
Goalies
Matt Murray
Referees:
Dan O'Halloran
Chris Lee
Linesmen:
Michel Cormier
Pierre Racicot

| | 0–1 | 5:03 – Eichel (Matthews, McDavid) (PP) |
| | 0–2 | 25:27 – Gaudreau (Parayko, Larkin) |
| | 0–3 | 27:27 – Drouin (Nugent-Hopkins, Gostisbehere) |
| | 0–4 | 34:37 – MacKinnon (Parayko) |
| Filppula (Jokinen, Komarov) – 55:53 | 1–4 |

4 min
Penalties
6 min
25
Shots
43

| September 19, 2016; 8:00 PM | North America | 3–4 (1–0, 1–4, 1–0) | Russia | Air Canada Centre, Toronto; Attendance: 19,078 |

Game reference

Matt Murray
John Gibson
Goalies
Sergei Bobrovsky
Referees:
Gord Dwyer
Dan O'Halloran
Linesmen:
Shane Heyer
Derek Amell

| Matthews (McDavid, Scheifele) – 5:14 | 1–0 |
| | 1–1 | Namestnikov (Telegin, Anisimov) – 29:29 |
| | 1–2 | Kucherov (Kulemin) – 30:19 |
| | 1–3 | Kuznetsov (Panarin, Zaitsev) – 33:37 |
| | 1–4 | Tarasenko (Datsyuk, Ovechkin) – 35:43 |
| Rielly (Nugent-Hopkins, Gaudreau) – 37:56 | 2–4 |
| Nugent-Hopkins (MacKinnon, Parayko) (PP) – 43:01 | 3–4 |

10 min
Penalties
16 min
46
Shots
25

| September 20, 2016; 3:00 PM | Finland | 0–2 (0–0, 0–1, 0–1) | Sweden | Air Canada Centre, Toronto; Attendance: 11,604 |

Game reference
| Tuukka Rask | Goalies | Henrik Lundqvist | Referees: Dan O'Rourke; Chris Lee; Linesmen: Pierre Racicot; Jonny Murray |
| 0–1 / Strålman (H.Sedin, D.Sedin) – 29:57; 0–2 / Eriksson (EN) – 59:57 | | | Referees: Dan O'Rourke; Chris Lee; Linesmen: Pierre Racicot; Jonny Murray |
| 8 min | Penalties | 8 min | Referees: Dan O'Rourke; Chris Lee; Linesmen: Pierre Racicot; Jonny Murray |
| 36 | Shots | 29 | Referees: Dan O'Rourke; Chris Lee; Linesmen: Pierre Racicot; Jonny Murray |

| September 21, 2016; 3:00 PM | North America | 4–3 OT (3–2, 0–0, 0–1) (OT 1–0) | Sweden | Air Canada Centre, Toronto; Attendance: 19,104 |

Game reference

John Gibson
Goalies
Henrik Lundqvist
Referees:
Kelly Sutherland
Gord Dwyer
Linesmen:
Derek Amell
Steve Miller

| Matthews (Rielly, McDavid) – 0:30 | 1–0 |
| Trocheck (Gostisbehere, Eichel) – 1:35 | 2–0 |
| | 2–1 | 8:24 – Forsberg (Hörnqvist, Bäckström) |
| Gaudreau (Gostisbehere) – 13:57 | 3–1 |
| | 3–2 | 16:28 – Bäckström (Forsberg, Karlsson) |
| | 3–3 | 46:50 – Berglund (Karlsson, Söderberg) |
| MacKinnon (Gaudreau, Gostisbehere) – 64:11 | 4–3 |

10 min
Penalties
8 min
49
Shots
38

| September 22, 2016; 3:00 PM | Finland | 0–3 (0–0, 0–2, 0–1) | Russia | Air Canada Centre, Toronto; Attendance: 12,098 |

Game reference

Tuukka Rask
Goalies
Sergei Bobrovsky
Referees:
Eric Furlatt
Wes McCauley
Linesmen:
Jonny Murray
Shane Heyer

| 0–1 | 23:42 – Tarasenko (Ovechkin) |
| 0–2 | 25:01 – Telegin (Shipachyov) |
| 0–3 | 43:39 – Malkin (Emelin) |

4 min
Penalties
6 min
21
Shots
22

== Knockout stage ==
All times are local, Eastern Daylight Time (UTC−04:00).

=== Bracket ===
Semi-finals
September 24
Canada | 5
Russia | 3
September 25
Sweden | 2
Europe (OT) | 3

Final (best of three)
September 27 & 29
Canada | 3 | 2 | –
Europe | 1 | 1 | –

=== Semi-finals ===
| September 24, 2016; 7:00 PM | Canada | 5–3 (1–0, 1–2, 3–1) | Russia | Air Canada Centre, Toronto; Attendance: 19,021 |

Game reference

Carey Price
Goalies
Sergei Bobrovsky
Referees:
Kelly Sutherland
Wes McCauley
Linesmen:
Brian Murphy
Pierre Racicot

| Sidney Crosby – 7:40 | 1–0 |
| | 1–1 | 28:47 – Kucherov (Zaitsev, Malkin) |
| | 1–2 | 36:24 – Kuznetsov (Telegin, Dadonov) |
| Marchand (Crosby, Bergeron) – 37:36 | 2–2 |
| Marchand (Crosby, Bergeron) – 41:16 | 3–2 |
| Perry (Couture, Vlasic) – 45:48 | 4–2 |
| Tavares (Getzlaf, Vlasic) – 49:22 | 5–2 |
| | 5–3 | 59:51 – Panarin (Kulemin, Kucherov) |

6 min
Penalties
6 min
47
Shots
34

| September 25, 2016; 1:00 PM | Sweden | 2–3 (OT) (0–0, 1–1, 1–1) (OT 0–1) | Europe | Air Canada Centre, Toronto; Attendance: 12,595 |

Game reference

Henrik Lundqvist
Goalies
Jaroslav Halák
Referees:
Dan O'Halloran
Dan O'Rourke
Linesmen:
Derek Amell
Jonny Murray

| Bäckström (Strålman, Hörnqvist) – 22:31 | 1–0 |
| | 1–1 | 36:27 – Gáborík (Ehrhoff, Kopitar) |
| | 1–2 | 40:12 – Tatar (Sekera) |
| Karlsson (H. Sedin, D. Sedin) – 55:28 | 2–2 |
| | 2–3 | 63:43 – Tatar (Zuccarello, Kopitar) |

6 min
Penalties
8 min
39
Shots
31

=== Final ===
The final was played in a best-of-three format.

| September 27, 2016; 8:00 PM | Canada | 3–1 (2–0, 0–1, 1–0) | Europe | Air Canada Centre, Toronto; Attendance: 18,377 |

Game reference

Carey Price
Goalies
Jaroslav Halák
Referees:
Wes McCauley
Kelly Sutherland
Linesmen:
Brian Murphy
Pierre Racicot

| Marchand (Bergeron, Crosby) – 2:33 | 1–0 |
| Stamkos (Getzlaf) – 13:20 | 2–0 |
| | 2–1 | 27:00 – Tatar (Seidenberg, Kopitar) |
| Bergeron (Crosby, Marchand) – 49:24 | 3–1 |

4 min
Penalties
2 min
38
Shots
33

| September 29, 2016; 8:00 PM | Europe | 1–2 (1–0, 0–0, 0–2) | Canada | Air Canada Centre, Toronto; Attendance: 19,080 |

Game reference

Jaroslav Halák
Goalies
Carey Price
Referees:
Dan O'Rourke
Dan O'Halloran
Linesmen:
Derek Amell
Jonny Murray

| Chára (Sekera, Nielsen) – 6:26 | 1–0 |
| | 1–1 | Bergeron (Burns, Crosby) (PP) – 57:07 |
| | 1–2 | Marchand (Toews, Pietrangelo) (SH) – 59:16 |

10 min
Penalties
4 min
34
Shots
33

== Ranking and statistics ==
2016 World Cup of Hockey winners

Canada
2nd title

=== Final standings ===
| Pos | Grp | Team | GP | W | L | OTL | ROW | GF | GA | GD | Pts | Final result |
|---|---|---|---|---|---|---|---|---|---|---|---|---|
| 1 | A | Canada | 6 | 6 | 0 | 0 | 6 | 24 | 8 | +16 | 12 | Champions |
| 2 | A | Europe | 6 | 3 | 3 | 0 | 3 | 12 | 13 | −1 | 6 | Runners-up |
| 3 | B | Sweden | 4 | 2 | 0 | 2 | 2 | 9 | 8 | +1 | 6 | Semifinalists |
| 4 | B | Russia | 4 | 2 | 2 | 0 | 2 | 11 | 10 | +1 | 4 | Semifinalists |
| 5 | B | North America | 3 | 2 | 1 | 0 | 2 | 11 | 8 | +3 | 4 | Eliminated in group stage |
| 6 | A | Czech Republic | 3 | 1 | 1 | 1 | 1 | 6 | 12 | −6 | 3 | Eliminated in group stage |
| 7 | A | United States | 3 | 0 | 3 | 0 | 0 | 5 | 11 | −6 | 0 | Eliminated in group stage |
| 8 | B | Finland | 3 | 0 | 3 | 0 | 0 | 1 | 9 | −8 | 0 | Eliminated in group stage |

Source: National Hockey League

=== Scoring leaders ===
List depicts skaters sorted by points, then goals.

| Player | Team | GP | G | A | Pts | +/- |
|---|---|---|---|---|---|---|
| (Canada) Sidney Crosby | Canada | 6 | 3 | 7 | 10 | 8 |
| (Canada) Brad Marchand | Canada | 6 | 5 | 3 | 8 | 5 |
| (Canada) Patrice Bergeron | Canada | 6 | 4 | 3 | 7 | 4 |
| (Canada) Jonathan Toews | Canada | 6 | 3 | 2 | 5 | 6 |
| (United States) Johnny Gaudreau | North America | 3 | 2 | 2 | 4 | 2 |
| (Sweden) Nicklas Bäckström | Sweden | 4 | 2 | 2 | 4 | 3 |
| (Canada) Matt Duchene | Canada | 6 | 2 | 2 | 4 | 3 |
| (Sweden) Erik Karlsson | Sweden | 4 | 1 | 3 | 4 | 2 |
| (Canada) Logan Couture | Canada | 6 | 1 | 3 | 4 | 3 |
| (Canada) John Tavares | Canada | 6 | 1 | 3 | 4 | 2 |
| (Norway) Mats Zuccarello | Europe | 6 | 1 | 3 | 4 | 2 |

Source: WCH2016

=== Leading goaltenders ===
Only goaltenders who played greater than or equal to one-third of the team's minutes are included.

| Player | Team | GP | W | GA | GAA | SVS% | SO | MIP |
|---|---|---|---|---|---|---|---|---|
| (Canada) Carey Price | Canada | 5 | 5 | 7 | 1.40 | 0.957 | 1 | 300 |
| (Slovakia) Jaroslav Halák | Europe | 6 | 3 | 13 | 2.15 | 0.941 | 1 | 362 |
| (Sweden) Henrik Lundqvist | Sweden | 3 | 1 | 7 | 2.25 | 0.940 | 1 | 187 |
| (United States) John Gibson | North America | 2 | 1 | 3 | 2.09 | 0.932 | 0 | 86 |
| (Russia) Sergei Bobrovsky | Russia | 4 | 2 | 10 | 2.53 | 0.930 | 1 | 237 |
| (Czech Republic) Petr Mrázek | Czech Republic | 2 | 1 | 6 | 2.98 | 0.925 | 1 | 121 |
| (Finland) Tuukka Rask | Finland | 2 | 0 | 4 | 2.02 | 0.920 | 0 | 119 |

Source: WCH2016

== Broadcasting ==
In Canada, Rogers Communications held broadcast rights to the tournament; the tournament was aired by Sportsnet in English and TVA Sports in French. Similarly to its sub-licensing agreement for Hockey Night in Canada, the semi-finals and finals were simulcast by CBC Television. Although it was initially reported that Rogers was allowed to match competing bids for the rights (such as by Bell Media and ESPN's TSN) per its holding of exclusive national media rights to the NHL in Canada, NHL Commissioner Gary Bettman denied that there was such a rule, and that the bidding process was "competitive".

In the United States, the tournament was broadcast by ESPN and ESPN Deportes in English and Spanish, respectively; NBC Sports, the national rightsholder of the NHL in the United States, passed on the tournament due to scheduling conflicts with various events being broadcast by its networks in that period of time.

ESPN also broadcast the tournament for the Spanish-speaking Latin American countries, the Commonwealth Caribbean, the Pacific Rim and Brazil. In Russia, the tournament was broadcast by Channel One and Match TV. In Finland, the tournament was broadcast by Viasat Sport and Nelonen. In Sweden, Denmark and Norway, the tournament was broadcast by Viasat Sport. In the Czech Republic, the tournament and exhibition games were broadcast by public channel ČT Sport and in Slovakia by Markíza. In Germany, the tournament was broadcast by Sport 1. In Poland, the tournament was broadcast by public channel TVP Sport.

The broadcasts incorporated the use of technology by British firm Supponor to allow for the digital replacement of advertising on the rink boards on selected camera shots. These allowed a single advertiser at a time to brand the entire board, localization of advertising in different media markets, and other customized graphics to be substituted onto the boards. Advertisements are replaced when cameras shots are switched to minimize distractions.

== Officials ==
The NHL selected seven of their referees and seven linesmen to officiate the tournament.

| Referees | Linesmen |
|---|---|
| (Canada) 19 – Gord Dwyer | (Canada) 75 – Derek Amell |
| (Canada) 27 – Eric Furlatt | (Canada) 76 – Michel Cormier |
| (Canada) 28 – Chris Lee | (Canada) 55 – Shane Heyer |
| (Canada) 4 – Wes McCauley | (Canada) 89 – Steve Miller |
| (Canada) 13 – Dan O'Halloran | (United States) 93 – Brian Murphy |
| (Canada) 9 – Dan O'Rourke | (Canada) 95 – Jonny Murray |
| (Canada) 11 – Kelly Sutherland | (Canada) 65 – Pierre Racicot |

== See also ==
- 2016 IIHF World Championship
- 1996 World Cup of Hockey
- 2004 World Cup of Hockey
- National Hockey League
- International Ice Hockey Federation
