= Eric Furlatt =

Canadian ice hockey referee

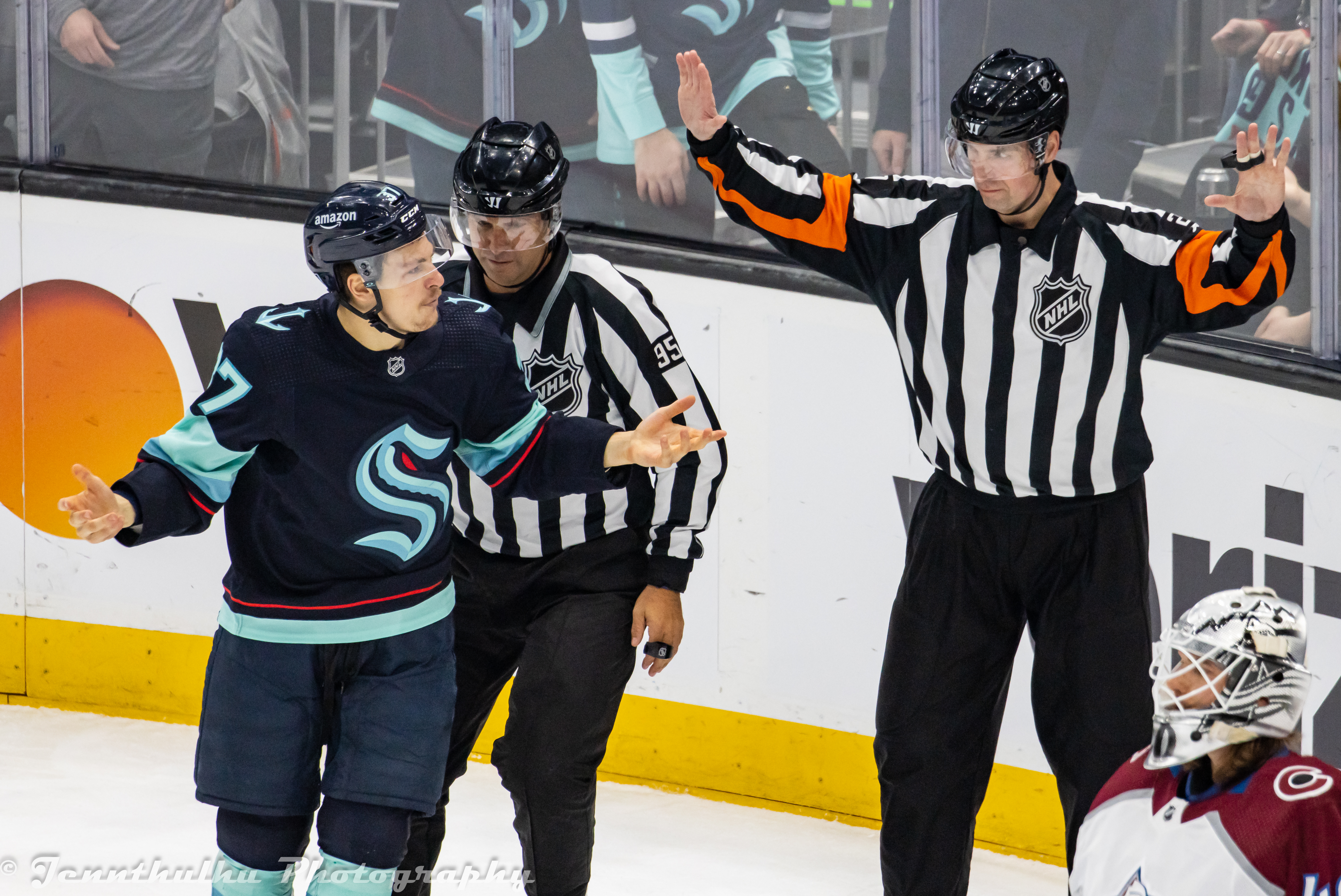
- Furlatt with Yanni Gourde and Jonny Murray during the 2023 Stanley Cup playoffs
- Born: December 2, 1971 (age 54); Trois-Rivières, Quebec, Canada
- Occupation: Ice hockey referee
- Years active: 2001–present
- Employer: National Hockey League

Eric Furlatt (born December 2, 1971) is a National Hockey League referee, wearing number 27. He made his debut during the 2001–02 NHL season. As of the start of the 2024–25 season, Furlatt has officiated 1,464 regular season games and 180 playoff games, including one Stanley Cup Final appearance.

== Early life ==
Eric Furlatt was raised in Cap-de-la-Madeleine, where he attended Académie les Estacades. He frequently watched his father play hockey at the former Jean-Guy Talbot Arena, stating in an interview with Radio-Canada that "[he] was practically raised" there. He began officiating after seeing his brother referee senior hockey, and officiated junior hockey, including Major Junior, before being hired by the NHL.

== Career ==
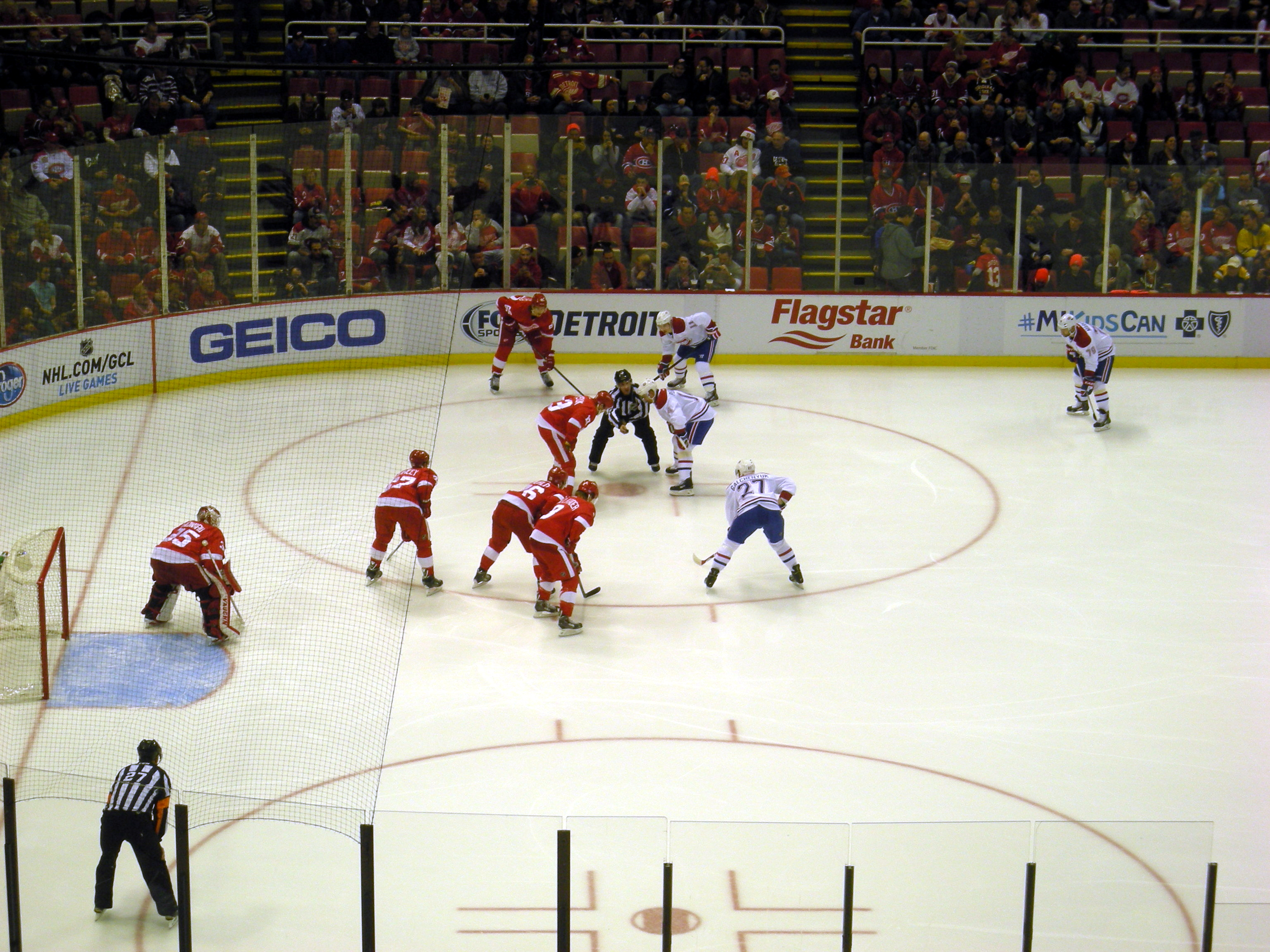
Furlatt (bottom left) in position for a faceoff at Joe Louis Arena in 2014

After being hired by the NHL in 1998, Furlatt refereed his first game on October 8, 2001, between the Philadelphia Flyers and the Columbus Blue Jackets at Nationwide Arena. He worked the game with referee Mark Faucette, and linesmen Mike Cvik and Steve Miller. His Stanley Cup playoff debut was game two of the 2003 Western Conference quarterfinals between the Anaheim Ducks and the Detroit Red Wings. Eighteen years after his first playoff game, Furlatt worked the 2021 Stanley Cup Final.

Furlatt was assigned to the 2012 NHL All-Star Game, the 2014, 2017 and 2019 NHL Stadium Series, and refereed in the 2016 World Cup of Hockey.

Furlatt worked his 1,000th game on February 18, 2017, between the Winnipeg Jets and the Montreal Canadiens. He was joined at the Bell Centre by Marc Joannette, Jonny Murray and Michel Cormier, forming an all-Québécois officiating crew. Furlatt referred his 1500th game on January 6, 2025 at the Bell Centre in Montreal, between the Montreal Canadiens and the Vancouver Canucks.

== Personal life ==
Furlatt is married, with two daughters. He received a bachelor’s degree in 1997.

== See also ==
- List of NHL on-ice officials
