= Francis Charron =

Canadian ice hockey referee

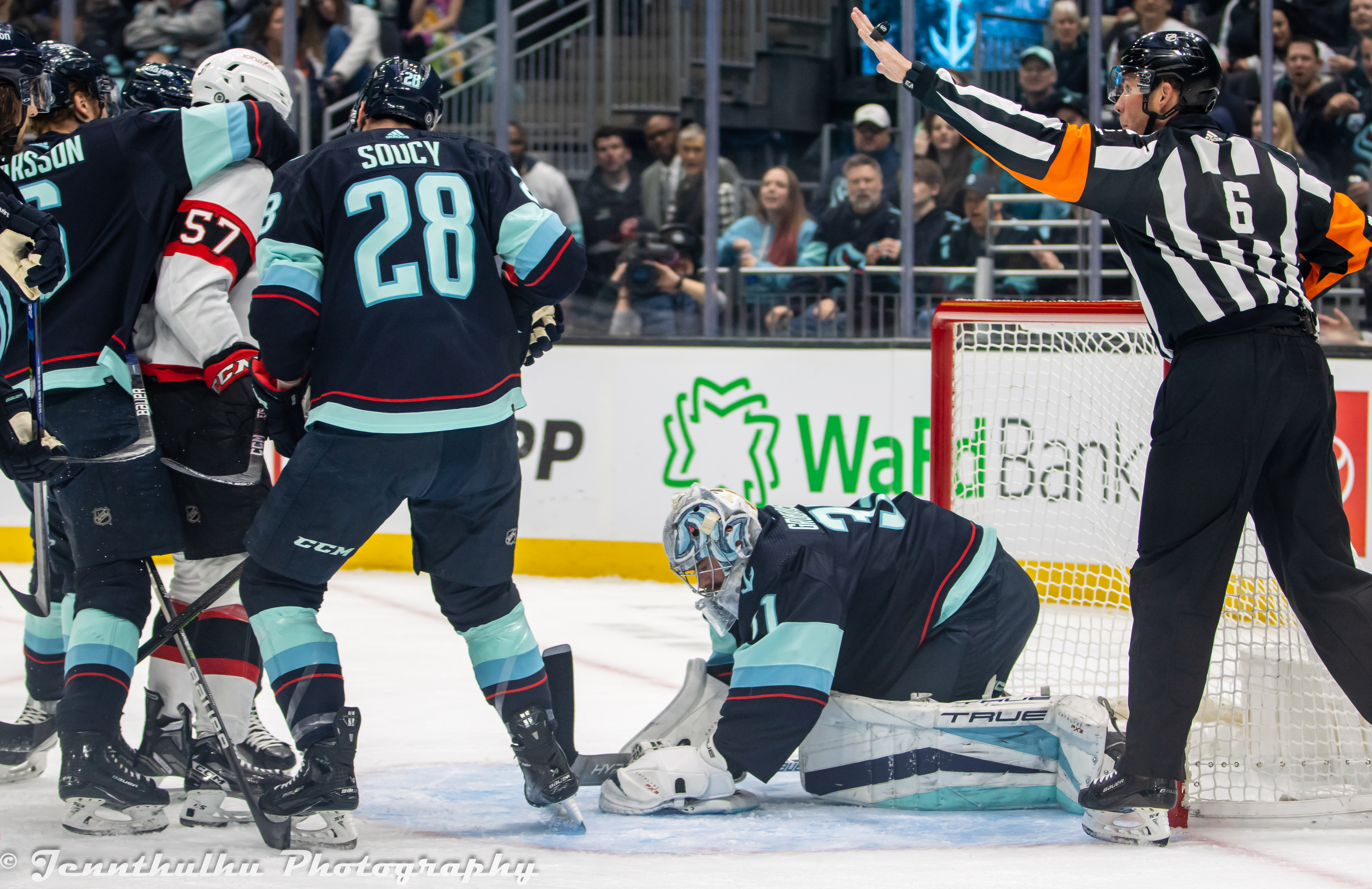
- Charron signals after Philipp Grubauer makes a save during a 2023 game
- Born: August 22, 1983 (age 42); Ottawa, Ontario, Canada
- Occupation: Ice hockey referee
- Years active: 2010–present
- Employer: National Hockey League

Francis Charron (born August 22, 1983) is a Canadian ice hockey referee currently officiating in the National Hockey League. He made his debut during the 2009–10 NHL season, and has worked 735 regular season games and 90 playoff games as of the start of the 2024–25 season. Charron has made two appearances in the Stanley Cup Final and wears uniform number six. Prior to the start of his professional hockey career, he refereed three Memorial Cups and two World Junior Ice Hockey Championships.

== Early life ==
Francis Charron was born August 22, 1983 in Ottawa, Ontario. He was raised in neighbouring Gatineau, Quebec, where he played and officiated minor hockey.

== Career ==
Charron began his career as a linesman for the Quebec Major Junior Hockey League before moving up to referee his second season. He spent six seasons in the QMJHL and officiated in four President’s Cup finals, as well as the 2006, 2007 and 2008 Memorial Cup. He also officiated the 2005 U-18 Junior World Cup, the 2006 CIS University Cup, and the 2007 and 2008 World Junior Ice Hockey Championships.

Charron officiated games one, four, and seven of the 2009 ECHL Kelly Cup Finals. On August 25, 2009, Charron was signed by the National Hockey League (NHL), and started the 2009–10 season in the American Hockey League. He made his NHL debut on April 5, 2010, officiating a match-up between the Columbus Blue Jackets and St. Louis Blues with referee Dan O'Halloran, and linesmen Shane Heyer and Thor Nelson. His first postseason assignment was game one of the 2014 Stanley Cup playoff series between the Detroit Red Wings and the Boston Bruins. He has since worked the 2020 and 2021 Cup Finals. Charron was selected to referee the 2019 NHL Winter Classic and the 2024 NHL All-Star Game.

== Personal life ==
Charron lives in Philadelphia, Pennsylvania, with his wife and two children.

== See also ==
- List of NHL on-ice officials
