= Jonny Murray =

Canadian ice hockey official

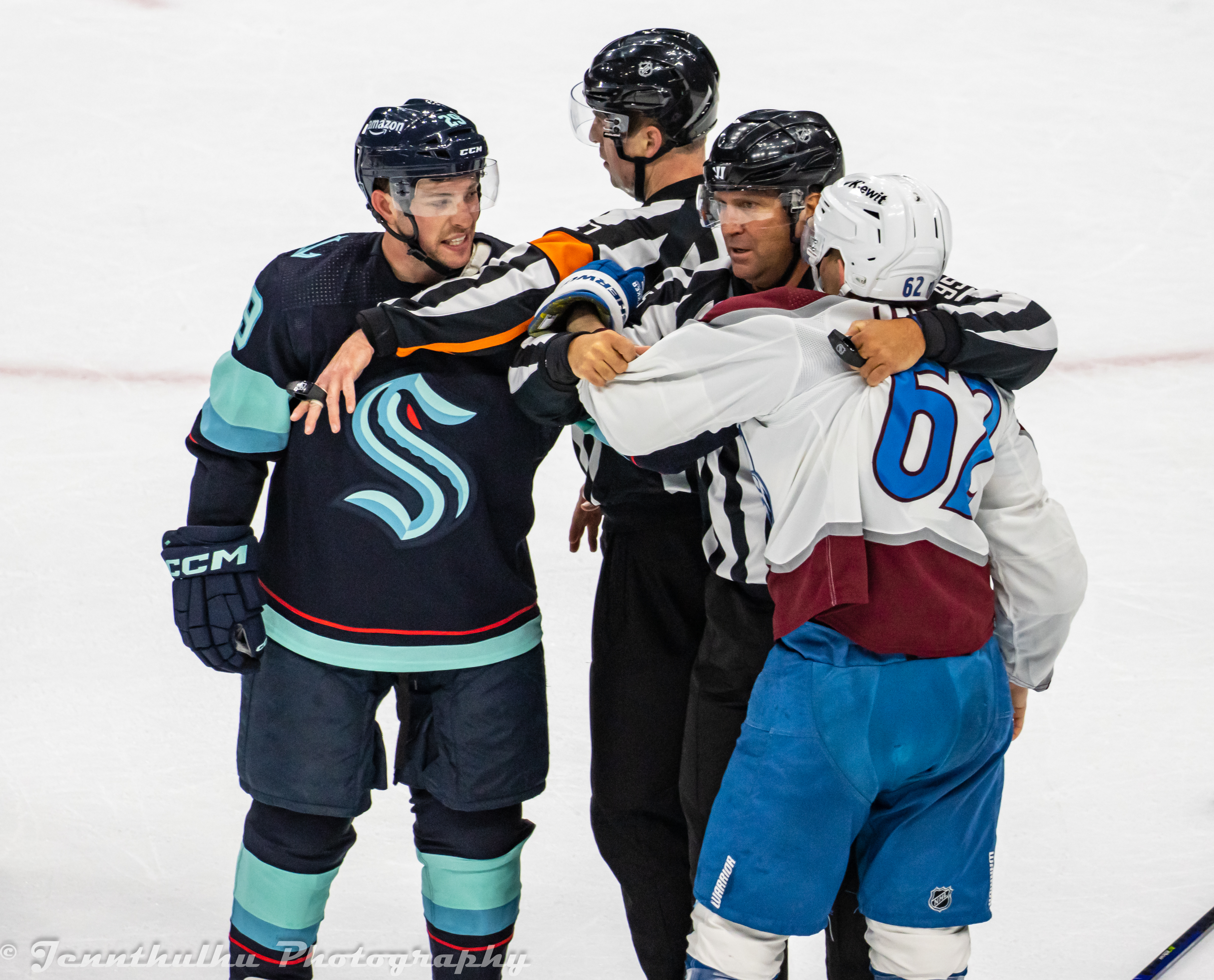
- Murray holds on to Artturi Lehkonen during the 2023 Stanley Cup playoffs
- Born: August 10, 1974 (age 51); Beauport, Quebec, Canada
- Occupation: Ice hockey linesman
- Years active: 2000–present
- Employer: National Hockey League

Jonny Murray (born August 10, 1974) is a Canadian National Hockey League linesman, who wears uniform number 95. He made his debut during the 2000–01 NHL season, and has officiated 1,506 regular season games and 192 playoff games, including seven Stanley Cup Final appearances, as of the start of the 2024–25 season.

== Early life ==
Jonny Murray was born on August 10, 1974 in Beauport, Quebec. He was raised in a francophone family and joined the Quebec Major Junior Hockey League as an on-ice official at the age of 17. After working half a season in the QMJHL, Murray decided that he wanted to become an NHL official and spent the following summer in Calgary, Alberta, to improve his English.

Murray continued his Major Junior career and officiated in the American Hockey League before being hired by the NHL in 2000.

== Career ==
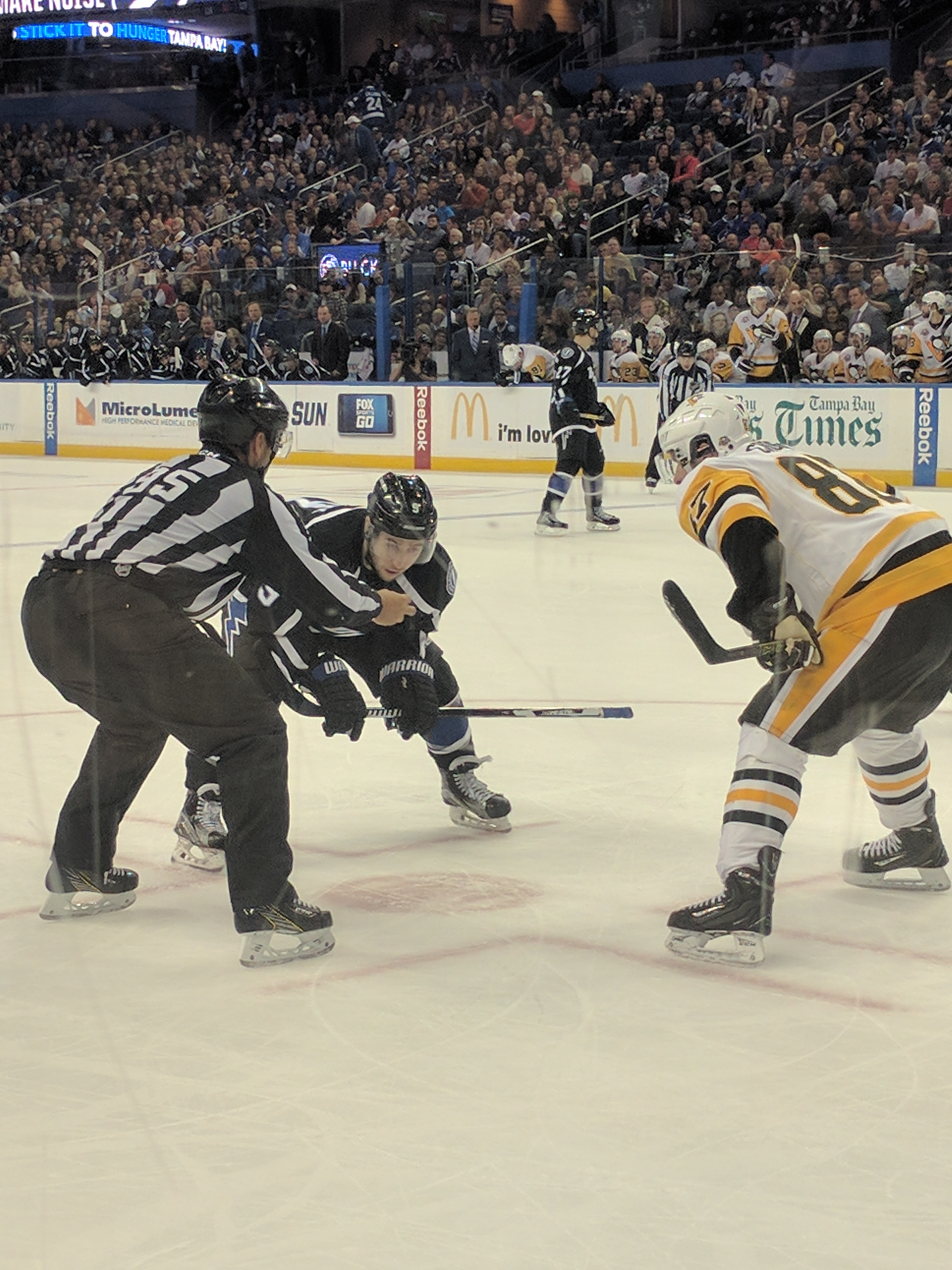
Murray drops the puck for a faceoff during a 2016 game between the Pittsburgh Penguins and the Tampa Bay Lightning

Murray made his NHL debut on October 7, 2000 at the Corel Centre, for a game between the Dallas Stars and the Ottawa Senators. His crew members included referees Terry Gregson and Bernard Degrace, and linesman Pierre Champoux.

Murray worked his 1,000th game on December 29, 2016 between the Montreal Canadiens and the Florida Panthers at the BB&T Center. He requested for referees Eric Furlatt and Marc Joannette, and linesman Pierre Racicot to work the game with him. Furlatt and Joannette were hired as NHL officials around the same time as Murray, and the four had become close friends.

He officiated the 2012, 2016, 2018, 2021, 2022, 2023 and 2024 Stanley Cup Final. Murray also officiated the 2014 NHL Stadium Series, the 2016 NHL All-Star Game and the 2021 NHL Outdoors at Lake Tahoe games. In 2016, he was one of the officials for the first World Cup of Hockey since 2004. Murray was one of eight officials selected to work the 4 Nations Face-Off in February 2025.

== Personal life ==
Murray relocated to Tampa, Florida, at the end of the 2000–01 NHL season. He moved to Fort Lauderdale in 2013. He has two children who were raised in Quebec City, and requested for two Montreal Canadiens home games every season so he could visit them. They attended their father’s 1,000th game in Sunrise.

== See also ==
- List of NHL on-ice officials
