= Dan O'Rourke (ice hockey) =

Canadian ice hockey referee and player (born 1972)

- Born: August 31, 1972 (age 53); Calgary, Alberta, Canada
- Occupation: Ice hockey referee
- Years active: 1999–present
- Employer: National Hockey League
Ice hockey career
- Height: 6 ft 3 in (191 cm)
- Weight: 195 lb (88 kg; 13 st 13 lb)
- Position: Left Wing
- Shot: Left
- Played for: Erie Panthers; Louisiana IceGators
- Playing career: 1993–1997

Dan O'Rourke (born August 31, 1972) is a Canadian former professional ice hockey player and current National Hockey League referee. He made his debut during the 1999–2000 NHL season, and has officiated 1,329 regular season games as of the start of the 2024–25 season. O’Rourke has also appeared in 202 playoff games, including seven Stanley Cup Finals. He wears uniform number nine.

== Early life ==
Dan O'Rourke was born on August 31, 1972 in Calgary, Alberta. He played junior hockey with the Summerland Buckaroos of the British Columbia Junior Hockey League, and the Notre Dame Hounds of the Saskatchewan Junior Hockey League before moving up to the Western Hockey League. He played with the Tri-City Americans for three seasons, and finished his final WHL season with the Moose Jaw Warriors in 1993.

== Career ==
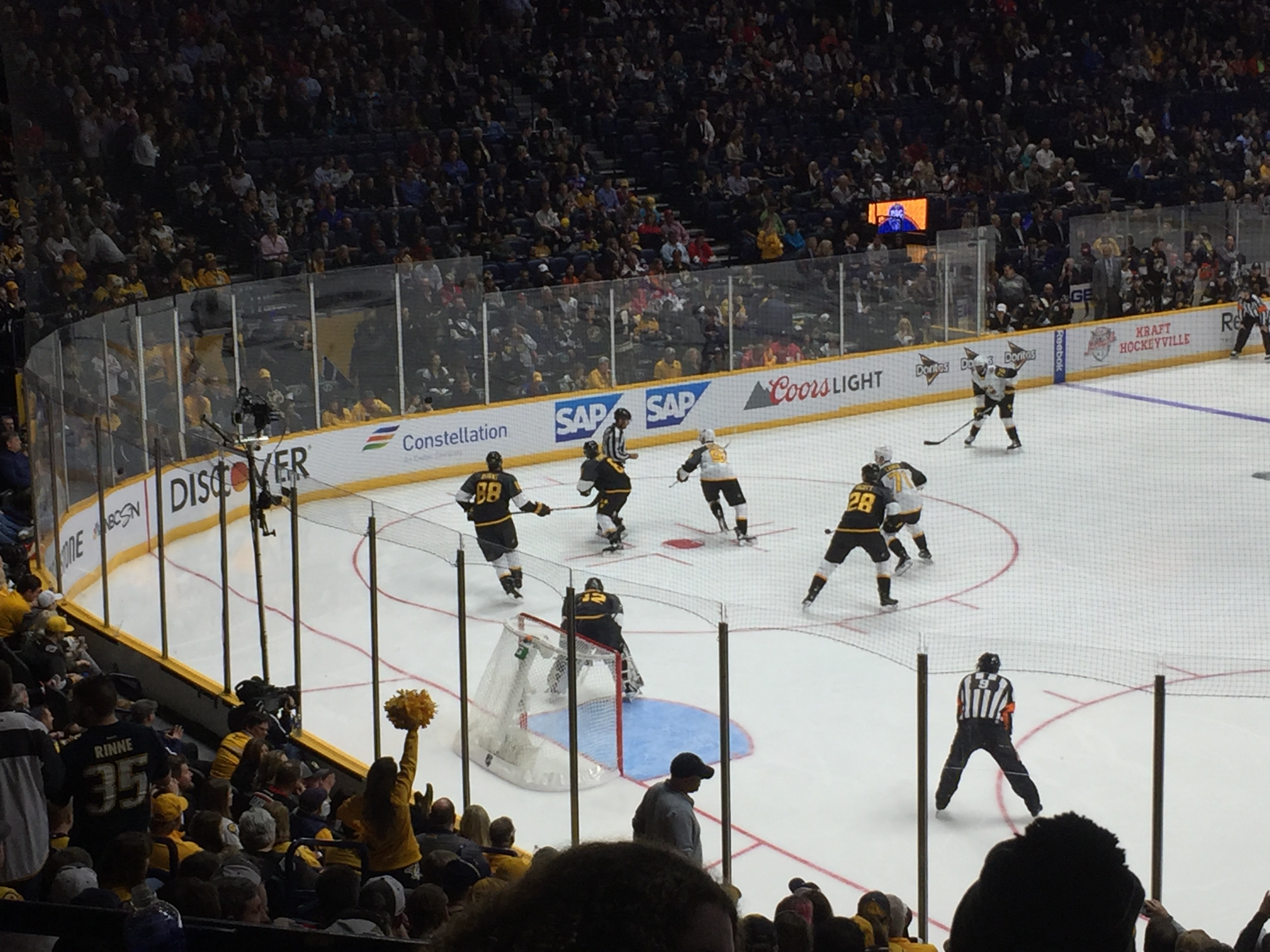
O'Rourke (bottom right) at the 2016 NHL All-Star Game

Prior to officiating professional hockey, O'Rourke played in the ECHL with the Louisiana IceGators and Erie Panthers as a forward, and spent one season with the Tulsa Oilers of the Central Hockey League. He was called up to the International Hockey League for two games during the 1996–97 season. He also played in Roller Hockey International's 1994 season.

O'Rourke began his officiating career during the 1997–98 ECHL season, being hired as a linesman after attending the Ontario Hockey Association Officials Camp. He worked the 1999 Kelly Cup Finals, and accepted an NHL minor league contract that summer. He split the following season between the NHL and the American Hockey League. After officiating the 2000 Calder Cup Finals, he was promoted to full-time linesman for the 2000–01 NHL season.

At the time O'Rourke had worked his first full season as a linesman, the NHL was transitioning to the four man officiating system. This led to a shortage of qualified referees as the previous system only required one referee. Because of this, he decided to return to the AHL and work back up to a full-time NHL contract as a referee. He spent four more seasons splitting games between the two leagues, and officiated the 2003, 2004 and 2005 Calder Cup Finals before being promoted to full-time referee for the 2005–06 NHL season.

His first NHL game was on October 2, 1999, between the New Jersey Devils and the Atlanta Thrashers at Philips Arena. He worked as a linesman along with Jean Morin, and referee Terry Gregson. O'Rourke's first playoff appearance was game one of the 2007 Eastern Conference quarterfinals between the Ottawa Senators and the Pittsburgh Penguins.

He was selected to officiate in the 2011 Stanley Cup Final alongside Stephen Walkom, Dan O'Halloran and Kelly Sutherland. He went on to work the 2012, 2016, 2020, 2021, 2023 and 2024 Stanley Cup Final. O'Rourke also participated in the 2014 Stadium Series, the 2016 NHL All-Star Game, the 2017 Centennial Classic, and the 2022 Stadium Series. In 2016, he officiated the first World Cup of Hockey since 2004.

O'Rourke refereed his 1,000th NHL game on December 27, 2017, between the Vegas Golden Knights and the Anaheim Ducks at the Honda Center. He was joined by Chris Lee, Greg Devorski, and Brian Mach. Mach worked ECHL games that O'Rourke played in, and officiated with him at the beginning of his NHL career. O'Rourke also worked Mach’s 100th NHL game.

== Personal life ==
O'Rourke lives in Atlanta, Georgia with his wife and two children. His son Austin played NCAA Division I hockey at UMass Lowell, and was hired by the AHL as a referee for the 2023–24 season. O'Rourke's brother, Steve, is a former ice hockey player and current head coach for PWHL Seattle.

== Career statistics ==
			Regular season					Playoffs
Season	Team	League	GP	G	A	Pts	PIM	GP	G	A	Pts	PIM
1987–88	Summerland Buckaroos	BCJHL	2	0	0	0	2	—	—	—	—	—
1989–90	Notre Dame Hounds	SJHL	56	2	9	11	320	—	—	—	—	—
1990–91	Notre Dame Hounds	SJHL	9	2	3	5	54	—	—	—	—	—
1990–91	Tri-City Americans	WHL	14	0	0	0	37	7	0	1	1	23
1991–92	Tri-City Americans	WHL	46	4	8	12	197	5	0	2	2	26
1992–93	Tri-City Americans	WHL	18	0	2	2	83	—	—	—	—	—
1992–93	Moose Jaw Warriors	WHL	36	4	10	14	121	—	—	—	—	—
1993–94	Erie Panthers	ECHL	64	9	21	30	296	—	—	—	—	—
1994–95	Tulsa Oilers	CHL	57	12	19	31	180	7	0	1	1	53
1995–96	Louisiana IceGators	ECHL	40	10	18	28	257	3	0	0	0	9
1996–97	Louisiana IceGators	ECHL	58	28	20	48	160	10	3	1	4	42
1996–97	Detroit Vipers	IHL	1	0	0	0	0	—	—	—	—	—
1996–97	Houston Aeros	IHL	1	0	0	0	2	—	—	—	—	—
ECHL totals			162	47	59	106	713	13	3	1	4	51

== See also ==
- List of NHL on-ice officials
