= Michel Cormier =

Michel Cormier may refer to:

- Michel Cormier (ice hockey) (born 1945), Canadian ice hockey player who played in the WHA with the Phoenix Roadrunners
- Michel Cormier (journalist) (born 1957), Canadian journalist and CBC News foreign correspondent
- Michel Cormier (linesman) (born 1974), National Hockey League linesman
