= Petr Mrázek =

Czech ice hockey player (born 1992)

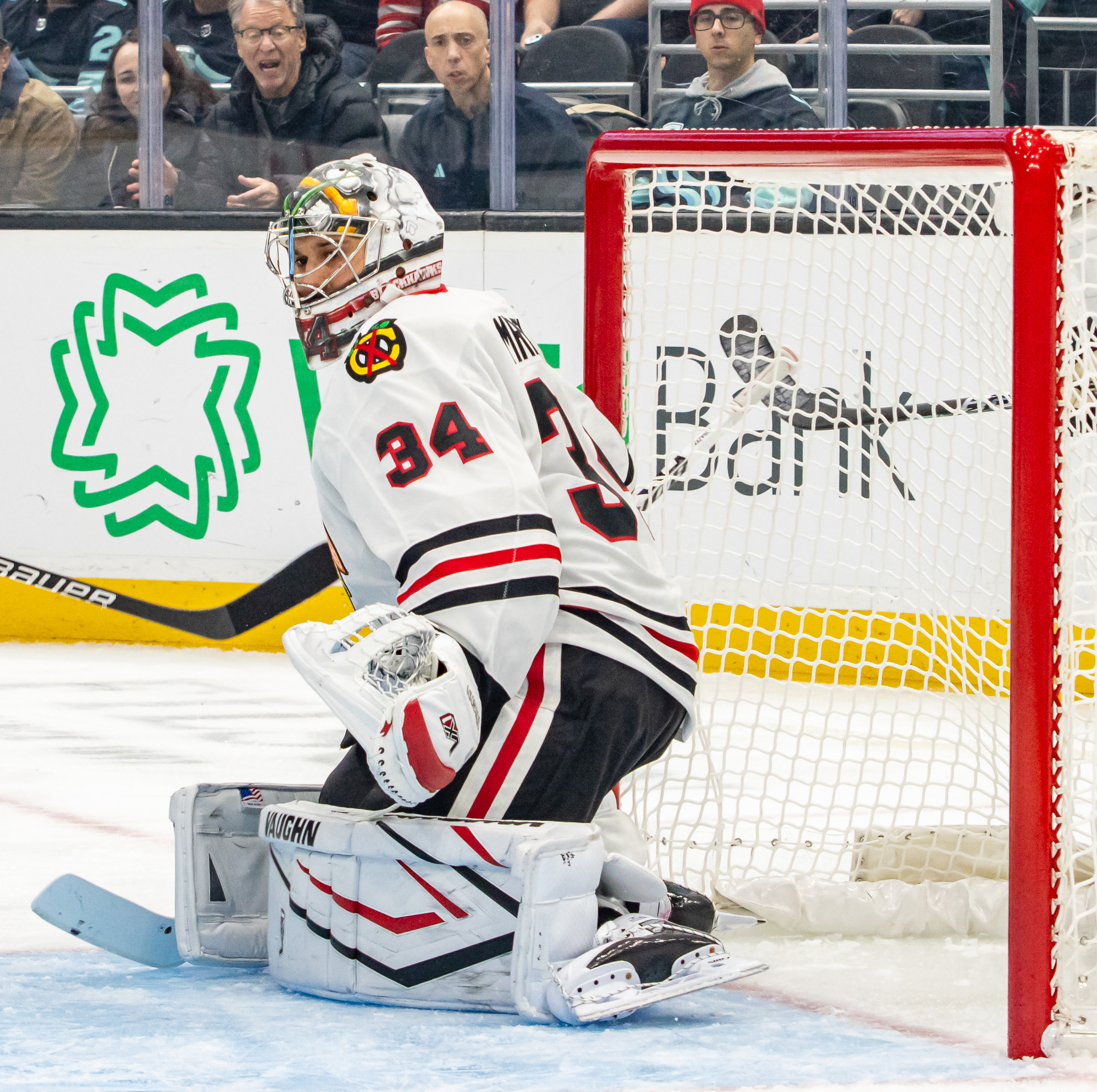
- Mrázek with the Chicago Blackhawks in 2024
- Born: 14 February 1992 (age 34) Ostrava, Czech Republic
- Height: 6 ft 2 in (188 cm)
- Weight: 181 lb (82 kg; 12 st 13 lb)
- Position: Goaltender
- Catches: Left
- NHL team Former teams: Free Agent; Detroit Red Wings; Philadelphia Flyers; Carolina Hurricanes; Toronto Maple Leafs; Chicago Blackhawks; Anaheim Ducks
- National team: Czech Republic
- NHL draft: 141st overall, 2010; Detroit Red Wings
- Playing career: 2012–present

Petr Mrázek (Czech: [ˈmraːzɛk]; born 14 February 1992) is a Czech professional ice hockey player who is a goaltender.

He was selected in the fifth round, 141st overall, by the Red Wings in the 2010 NHL entry draft, with whom he spent the first portion of his NHL career. He also played for the Detroit Red Wings, Philadelphia Flyers, Carolina Hurricanes, Toronto Maple Leafs and the Chicago Blackhawks.

== Playing career ==
=== Junior ===
Before going to North America, Mrázek played in the Czech Extraliga, where he appeared for HC Vítkovice Steel during the 2007–08 post-season.

In his first Ontario Hockey League (OHL) season with the Ottawa 67's in 2009–10, Mrázek posted a 12–9–1 record in 30 games with a 3.00 goals against average (GAA) and .905 save percentage. He played in eight playoff games with Ottawa, finishing with a 4–4–0 record, 2.39 GAA and a .928 save percentage. At the end of the season, at the 2010 NHL entry draft from 25 and 26 June, Mrázek was selected by the Detroit Red Wings in the fifth round, 141st overall.

On 19 October 2011, Mrázek signed a three-year, entry-level contract with the Red Wings. However, he remained in the OHL for the 2011–12 season, appearing in 50 regular season games for the 67's. He was 30–19 with three shutouts and had a 2.84 GAA and .917 save percentage in the regular season. In the playoffs, he appeared in 17 of 18 games, going 9–8 with a 2.59 GAA and .929 save percentage.

On 4 April 2011, upon the conclusion of Ottawa's season, Mrázek was signed by the Grand Rapids Griffins, the Detroit Red Wings' American Hockey League (AHL) affiliate, on an amateur try-out contract.

=== Professional ===
==== Detroit Red Wings ====
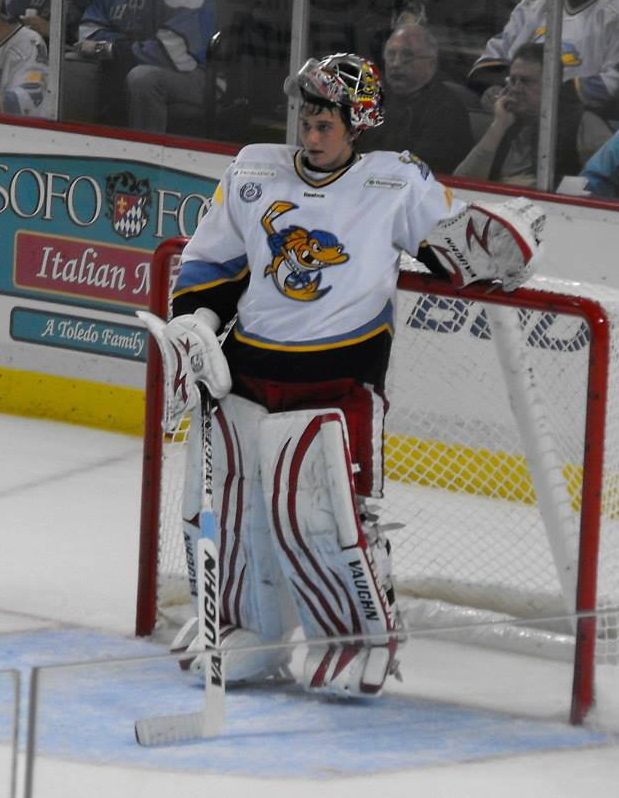
Mrázek with the Walleye in December 2012

Mrázek began the 2012–13 season with the Toledo Walleye of the ECHL, the Red Wings' second-tier minor league affiliate, where he won his first game 4–1 over the Kalamazoo Wings. Mrázek posted a 2–1–0 record, a 2.02 GAA and a .944 save percentage in three games played in the ECHL before being called up to Grand Rapids in the AHL. He made his AHL debut with the Griffins on 3 November 2012, and made 29 saves in a 4–1 victory over the Texas Stars. Mrázek won 12 of his first 15 appearances overall with the Griffins, also setting a franchise record in the process by winning his first six starts. He registered his first professional shutout on 2 February 2013, in a game against the Abbotsford Heat. Mrázek was named the AHL Player of the Week for the week ending 3 February 2013, after posting a 0.50 GAA and a .981 save percentage in two games played.

Mrázek made his NHL debut with the Red Wings on 7 February 2013, in a game against the St. Louis Blues. Detroit won 5–1, with Mrázek making 26 saves. With the win, Mrázek became the second goaltender in hockey history to win his ECHL, AHL and NHL debuts in the same season, joining Alex Auld.

Mrázek then represented the Griffins at the AHL All-Star Classic and recorded the win in a 7–6 game. The Griffins finished first in the Midwest Division and defeated the Syracuse Crunch in the Calder Cup Finals to capture the Calder Cup championship. Mrázek played all 24 playoff games and was 15–9 with four shutouts, posting a 2.31 GAA and .916 save percentage.

During the 2013–14 season, Mrázek was named to the AHL Second All-Star Team, finishing second in the AHL in GAA (2.10) and third in save percentage (.924) through 32 regular season games. He posted a 22–9–1 record in his second season with the Griffins, while also seeing action in nine games with Detroit in the NHL, obtaining a 2–4–0 record, 1.74 GAA and .927 save percentage. His two wins were shutouts at Edmonton on 2 November and at St. Louis on 13 April.

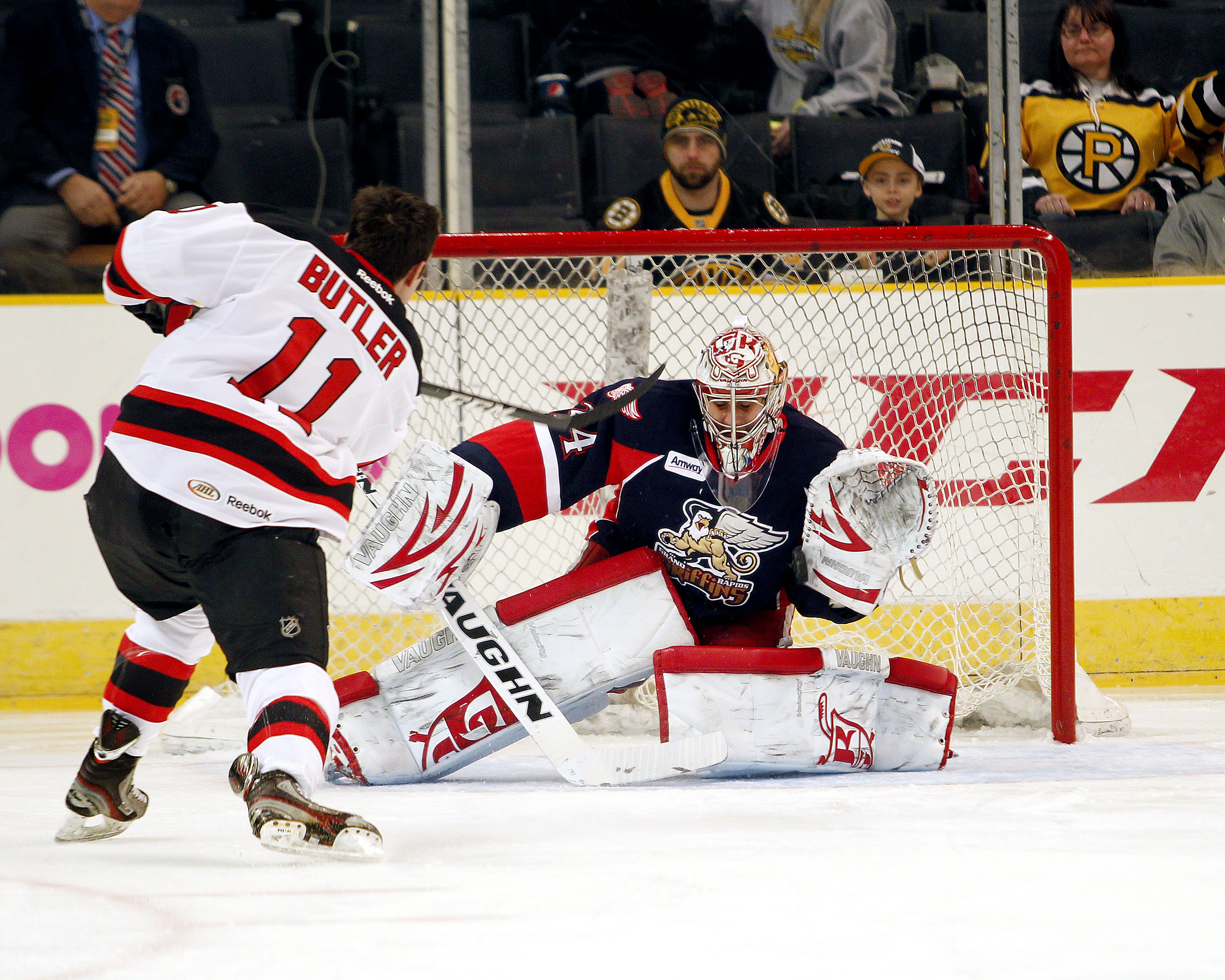
Mrázek attempts to stop Bobby Butler during an AHL All-Star skills competition in January 2013

On 1 July 2014, the Detroit Red Wings signed Mrázek to a one-year contract extension. During the 2014–15 season, he appeared in 29 games for the Red Wings, posting a 16–9–2 record, 2.38 GAA, .918 save percentage and three shutouts. Mrázek was named the AHL Player of the Week for the week ending 1 March 2015, after leading the Griffins to three consecutive wins on the road, with a 0.67 GAA and .976 save percentage. He also recorded consecutive shutouts against the Milwaukee Admirals on 27 February and the Chicago Wolves on 28 February, becoming the third Griffin to ever record back-to-back road shutouts. Mrázek recorded three shutouts in his last four games. He has allowed just two goals in his last 247:21 of game time for a 0.49 GAA and 0.983 save percentage (117 saves from 119 shots) during that span. Mrázek was recalled by the Red Wings on 9 March. Since being assigned to the Griffins on 17 February, Mrázek has not suffered a regulation loss, posting a 6–0–1 record, with a 1.13 goals against average, a 0.962 save percentage and three shutouts. Mrázek holds a record of 9–2–1 overall in 13 games with the Griffins this season, with a 2.06 goals against average and a 0.927 save percentage.

On 16 April 2015, Mrázek made his Stanley Cup playoffs debut against the Tampa Bay Lightning. In his first playoff game, he posted 44 saves on 46 shots to help lead the Red Wings to a 3–2 win. On 21 April, Mrázek posted his first career playoff shutout in a 3–0 win. On 25 April, Mrázek had another playoff shutout, a 4–0 win. He became the 14th Red Wings goaltender to post two shutouts in one playoff series, and only the third rookie goaltender to do so, following Earl Robertson in 1937 and Harry Lumley in 1945. Among NHL rookie goaltenders who started more than 15 games, Mrázek placed third in wins, second in goals-against average, first in save percentage and second in shutouts. Following the 2014–15 season, Mrázek was named the Detroit Red Wings Rookie of the Year by the Detroit Sports Broadcasters Association, now known as Detroit Sports Media.

Mrázek was named the NHL Second Star of the Week for the week ending 11 January 2016. During that time, Mrázek went 3–0–0 with a .67 GAA and .978 save percentage. Mrázek's GAA ranks sixth among NHL goalies with as many games played. This season, in 28 games played, Mrázek has posted a 15–8–3 record with a 2.16 GAA and .930 save percentage. Only Washington's Braden Holtby (.932) and Florida's Roberto Luongo (.931) have better save percentages among goalies who have logged as many games played.

==== Philadelphia Flyers ====
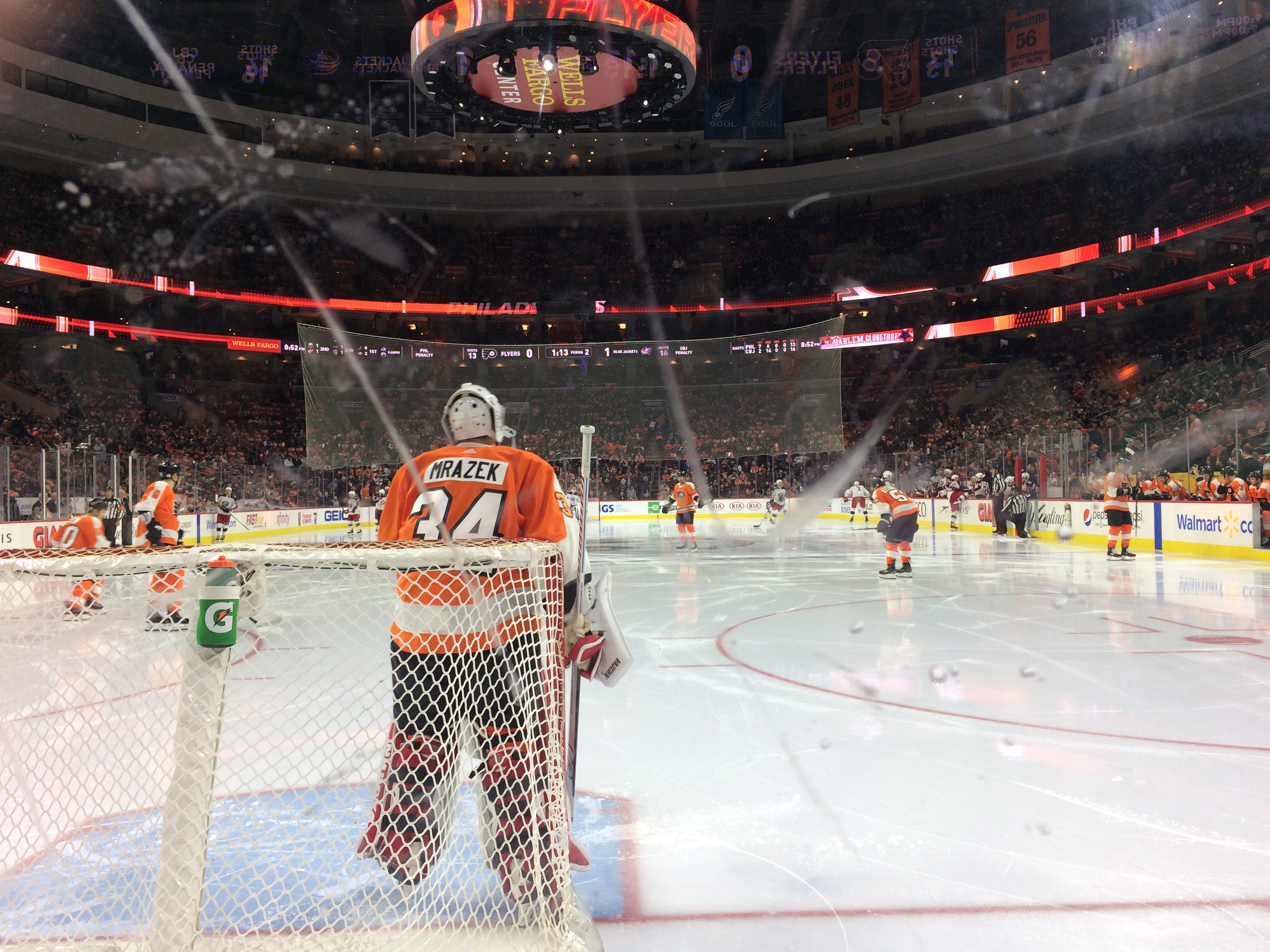
Mrázek with the Flyers in February 2018

On 19 February 2018, Mrázek was traded to the Philadelphia Flyers in exchange for a conditional fourth-round pick in the 2018 NHL Draft and a conditional third-round pick in 2019. On 22 February, he made his debut for the Flyers where he made 19 saves in a 2–1 victory over the Columbus Blue Jackets.

==== Carolina Hurricanes ====
At the conclusion of the season, Mrázek was not tendered a qualifying offer by the Flyers, releasing him to free agency. On July 1, 2018, Mrázek agreed to a one-year, $1.5 million contract with the Carolina Hurricanes.

Mrázek split most of the 2018–19 season with Curtis McElhinney. On April 4, 2019, Mrázek earned his 23rd win of the season as the Hurricanes clinched a playoff berth for the first time in 10 years. Overall, he recorded 23 wins and a 2.39 goals against average during the 2018–19 Carolina Hurricanes season, his best since 2015–16 with Detroit.

Mrázek and the Hurricanes then upset the defending Stanley Cup champion Washington Capitals in an opening round seven-game series en route to the Eastern Conference Finals, also for the first time in 10 years. He suffered an injury during the second round against the New York Islanders and was replaced by goaltender Curtis McElhinney for several games.

On July 1, 2019, Mrázek re-signed with the Hurricanes on a two-year, $6.25 million contract. He recorded a 21–16–2 record during the 2019–20 Carolina Hurricanes season prior to the pausing of the season due to the COVID-19 pandemic.

After starting the COVID-19 shortened 2020–21 season with a 0.99 GAA, Mrázek left his fourth start 2 minutes and 47 seconds into the game after sustaining an upper-body injury when teammate Max McCormick bumped into him, knocking the net off. This was later confirmed to be a thumb injury, severe enough that it required Mrázek to undergo surgery. On 4 April 2021, Mrázek returned from injury for the Hurricanes, posting his third shutout of the season.

==== Toronto Maple Leafs ====
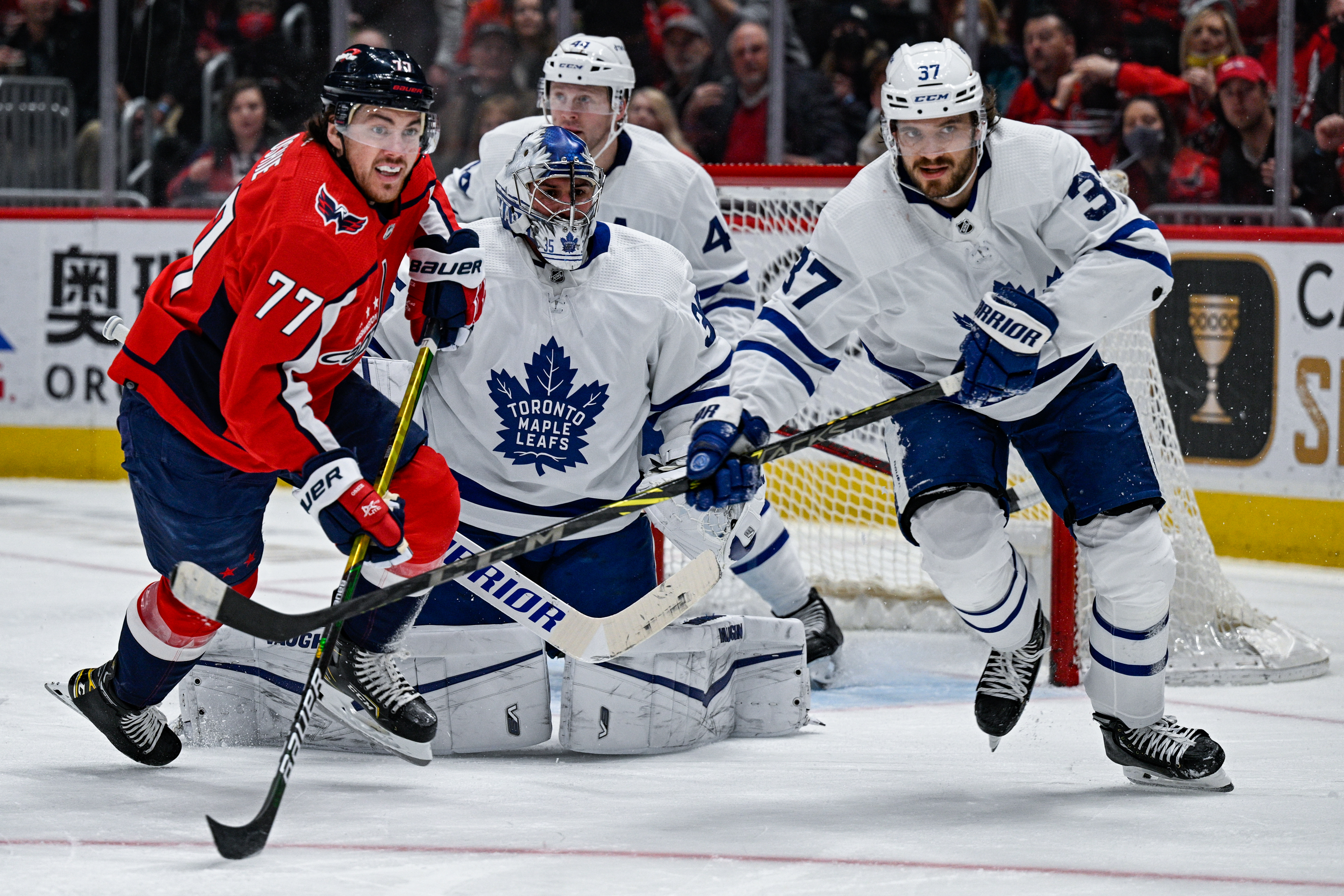
Mrázek in goal for the Maple Leafs, behind Washington Capitals forward T. J. Oshie and teammate Timothy Liljegren

On 28 July 2021, Mrázek signed as a free agent to a three-year, $11.4 million deal with the Toronto Maple Leafs. Maple Leafs general manager Kyle Dubas envisioned him operating as part of a goaltending tandem with Jack Campbell. However, Mrázek struggled immensely in his time with the team, never posting a monthly save percentage above .900. By midyear, with Campbell also struggling, Leafs goaltending was becoming a major point of discussion. A 26 February 2022 game against the Detroit Red Wings was widely identified as the nadir, with Mrázek relieving Campbell after he gave up four goals in six minutes in the third period, only to immediately allow another goal himself. Both Red Wings goaltenders also played poorly, leading to a 10–7 Leafs victory, one of the highest-scoring games in recent NHL history. On 20 March, Mrázek was placed on waivers by the Toronto Maple Leafs, playing one game with the Toronto Marlies before being recalled to the main club. Following an injury to Campbell, Mrázek briefly took over as starting goaltender, but then suffered a groin injury, with Marlies goaltender Erik Källgren stepping in. The injury marked the end of Mrázek's season. Despite an .888 save percentage in 20 appearances, he finished with a 12–6–0 record due to the Leafs' potent offense. It was widely assumed that the team would seek to move his contract in the off-season.

==== Chicago Blackhawks ====
On 7 July 2022, Mrázek was traded by the Maple Leafs along with a first-round pick in 2022 NHL entry draft to the Chicago Blackhawks in exchange for a second-round pick in 2022.

During the 2024–25 season, he appeared in 33 games for the Blackhawks and posted a 10–19–2 record with a 3.46 GAA and an .890 save percentage.

==== Return to Detroit ====
On 7 March 2025, Mrázek was traded by the Blackhawks, along with Craig Smith, back to the Red Wings in exchange for Joe Veleno.

==== Anaheim Ducks ====
On 28 June 2025, at the 2025 NHL entry draft, Mrázek was traded by the Red Wings, alongside two draft picks to the Anaheim Ducks in exchange for fellow goaltender John Gibson.

== International play ==
Medal record

Men's ice hockey

Representing the Czech Republic

World Championships
Gold medal – first place	2024 Czech Republic	
Bronze medal – third place	2012 Helsinki	

Mrázek represented the Czech Republic junior team at the 2012 World Junior Championships. He backstopped the team to the quarterfinals, where it was eliminated from medal contention in overtime by the Russia junior team. Mrázek was selected as the best goaltender of the championship. He was 3–3 with one shutout in six games in the championships with a 2.49 goals against and .928 save percentage; highlighted by a 52-save effort in a 5–2 win over the United States junior team. Mrázek was awarded the IIHF Directorate Top Goaltender award and was named one of the Czech Republic's top three players at the tournament.

Mrázek represented the Czech Republic senior team at the 2012 World Championship as the third goaltender, where he won a bronze medal. He represented the Czech Republic at the 2016 World Cup of Hockey, where he was 1–0–1 with a 2.98 GAA, and .925 save percentage. Mrázek represented the Czech Republic at the 2017 World Championship, where he was 1–2 with a 2.47 GAA, and .881 save percentage.

He represented the Czech Republic team at the 2024 World Championship and won a gold medal.

== Career statistics ==
=== Regular season and playoffs ===
			Regular season									Playoffs
Season	Team	League	GP	W	L	T/OT	MIN	GA	SO	GAA	SV%	GP	W	L	MIN	GA	SO	GAA	SV%
2009–10	Ottawa 67's	OHL	30	12	9	1	1,562	78	3	3.00	.905	8	4	4	451	18	0	2.39	.928
2010–11	Ottawa 67's	OHL	52	32	15	3	3,089	146	4	2.84	.920	4	0	3	224	21	0	5.63	.868
2011–12	Ottawa 67's	OHL	50	30	13	6	3,016	143	3	2.84	.917	17	9	8	1,065	46	0	2.59	.926
2012–13	Toledo Walleye	ECHL	3	2	1	0	179	6	0	2.01	.944	—	—	—	—	—	—	—	—
2012–13	Grand Rapids Griffins	AHL	42	23	16	2	2,498	97	1	2.33	.916	24	15	9	1,431	55	4	2.31	.916
2012–13	Detroit Red Wings	NHL	2	1	1	0	119	4	1	2.02	.922	—	—	—	—	—	—	—	—
2013–14	Grand Rapids Griffins	AHL	32	22	9	1	1,830	63	3	2.10	.924	10	5	5	600	28	0	2.80	.911
2013–14	Detroit Red Wings	NHL	9	2	4	0	449	13	2	1.74	.927	—	—	—	—	—	—	—	—
2014–15	Grand Rapids Griffins	AHL	13	9	2	0	756	26	3	2.06	.927	—	—	—	—	—	—	—	—
2014–15	Detroit Red Wings	NHL	29	16	9	2	1,585	64	3	2.38	.918	7	3	4	398	14	2	2.11	.925
2015–16	Detroit Red Wings	NHL	54	27	16	6	2,681	115	4	2.33	.921	3	1	2	178	4	1	1.36	.945
2016–17	Detroit Red Wings	NHL	50	18	21	9	2,858	145	1	3.04	.901	—	—	—	—	—	—	—	—
2017–18	Detroit Red Wings	NHL	22	8	7	3	1,184	57	3	2.89	.910	—	—	—	—	—	—	—	—
2017–18	Philadelphia Flyers	NHL	17	6	6	3	913	49	1	3.22	.891	1	0	0	31	2	0	3.87	.857
2018–19	Carolina Hurricanes	NHL	40	23	14	3	2,387	95	4	2.39	.914	11	5	5	660	30	2	2.73	.894
2019–20	Carolina Hurricanes	NHL	40	21	16	2	2,321	104	3	2.69	.905	5	2	3	317	11	0	2.08	.929
2020–21	Carolina Hurricanes	NHL	12	6	2	3	671	23	3	2.06	.923	2	1	1	124	8	0	3.90	.873
2021–22	Toronto Maple Leafs	NHL	20	12	6	0	1,042	58	0	3.34	.888	—	—	—	—	—	—	—	—
2021–22	Toronto Marlies	AHL	1	0	1	0	60	4	0	4.00	.846	—	—	—	—	—	—	—	—
2022–23	Chicago Blackhawks	NHL	39	10	22	3	2,166	132	0	3.66	.894	—	—	—	—	—	—	—	—
2023–24	Chicago Blackhawks	NHL	56	18	31	4	3,153	159	1	3.03	.908	—	—	—	—	—	—	—	—
2024–25	Chicago Blackhawks	NHL	33	10	19	2	1,840	106	0	3.46	.890	—	—	—	—	—	—	—	—
2024–25	Detroit Red Wings	NHL	5	2	2	0	241	10	1	2.49	.902	—	—	—	—	—	—	—	—
2025–26	Anaheim Ducks	NHL	10	3	5	0	516	35	0	4.07	.858	—	—	—	—	—	—	—	—
NHL totals			438	183	181	40	24,402	1,169	26	2.87	.905	29	12	15	1,706	69	5	2.43	.911

=== International ===
Year	Team	Event	Result	GP	W	L	MIN	GA	SO	GAA	SV%
2012	Czech Republic	WJC	5th	6	3	3	362	15	1	2.49	.928
2012	Czech Republic	WC	3rd place, bronze medalist(s)	1	0	0	9	0	0	0.00	1.000
2016	Czech Republic	WCH	6th	2	1	1	121	6	0	2.98	.925
2017	Czech Republic	WC	7th	4	1	2	243	10	0	2.47	.881
2024	Czech Republic	WC	1st place, gold medalist(s)	2	2	0	120	3	0	1.50	.906
Junior totals				6	3	3	362	15	1	2.49	.928
Senior totals				9	4	3	493	19	0	2.31	.928

== Awards and honours ==
Award	Year	Ref
F. W. "Dinty" Moore Trophy	2009–10	
World Junior Ice Hockey Championships First Team All-Star	2012	
World Junior Ice Hockey Championships Best Goaltender	2012	
AHL Second All-Star Team	2013–14	
