= Kelly Sutherland =

Canadian ice hockey official (born 1971)

- Born: April 18, 1971 (age 54); Richmond, British Columbia, Canada
- Occupation: Ice hockey referee
- Years active: 2000–present
- Employer: National Hockey League

Kelly Sutherland (born April 18, 1971, in Richmond, British Columbia) is a Canadian National Hockey League referee who wears uniform number 11.

== Career ==
Sutherland was one of the referees for the 2010 Stanley Cup Final along Bill McCreary, Dan O'Halloran, and Stephen Walkom. He was selected again to officiate the 2011 Stanley Cup Final, the 2015 Stanley Cup Final, 2016 Stanley Cup Final, 2018 Stanley Cup Final, 2019 Stanley Cup Final, 2020 Stanley Cup Final and the 2022 Stanley Cup Final. Sutherland officiated the gold medal game men's ice hockey tournament at the 2014 Winter Olympics in Sochi. Kelly was recognized on February 6, 2024 by the NHL for reaching 1500 games in his career.
