= Pierre Racicot =

Canadian ice hockey official

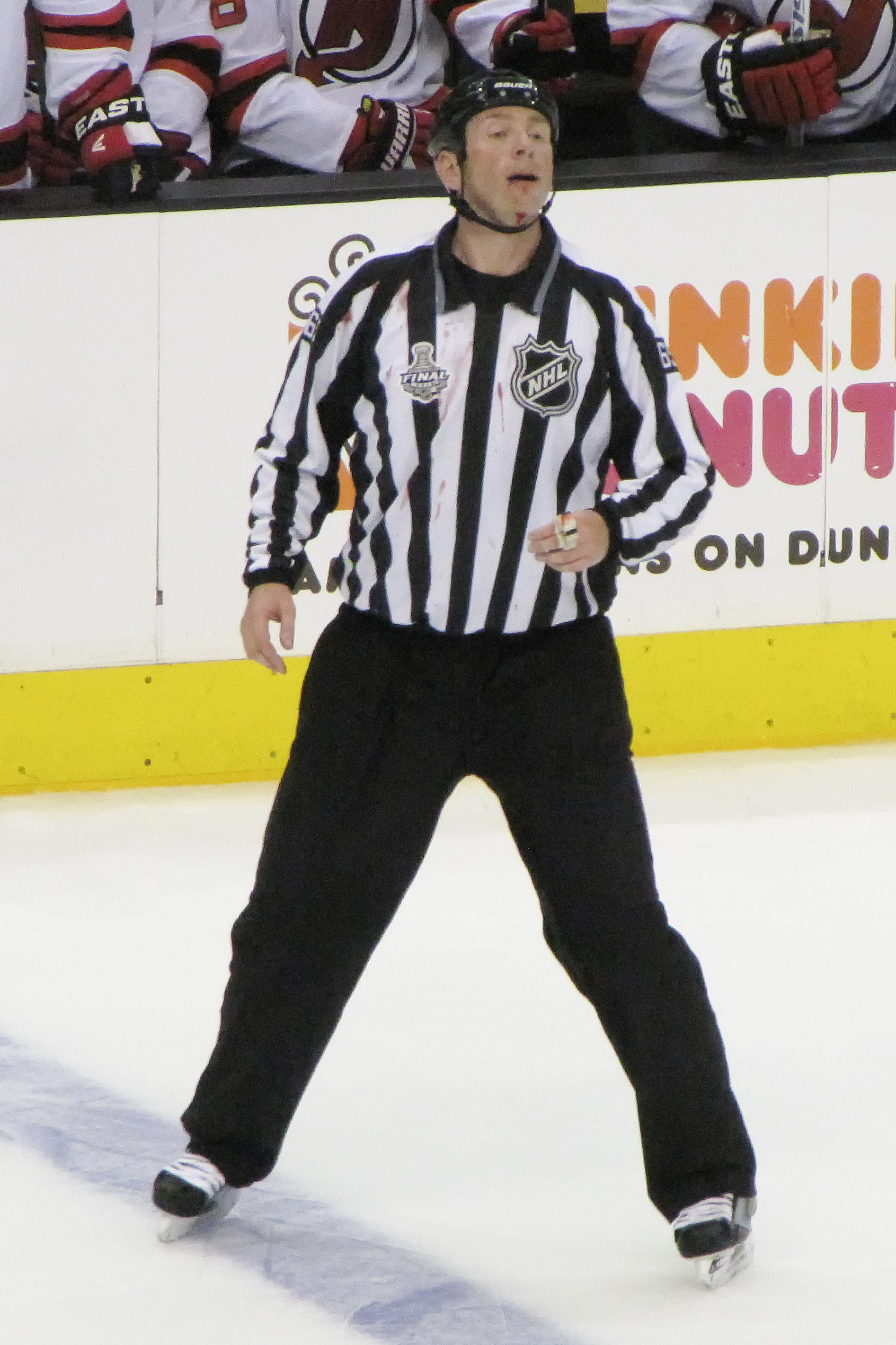
- Racicot after taking a high stick during the 2012 Stanley Cup Final
- Born: February 15, 1967; Verdun, Quebec, Canada
- Occupation: Ice hockey linesman
- Years active: 1993–2021
- Employer: National Hockey League

Pierre Racicot (born February 15, 1967, in Verdun, Quebec, now part of Montreal, Quebec) is a retired National Hockey League linesman. As an official, he wore uniform number 65.

Racicot officiated his first NHL game on October 12, 1993, between the Philadelphia Flyers and the Buffalo Sabres at the Spectrum. His final game was May 8, 2021, between the Florida Panthers and the Tampa Bay Lightning.

Overall, Racicot officiated 1,880 regular season games (14th all time among NHL history) and 254 playoff games (7th all time) over his 27-plus year career. He officiated 10 Stanley Cup Final series (2006, 2008, 2009, 2010, 2011, 2012, 2013, 2015, 2016, and 2019), the 2009 NHL All-Star Game, the 2004 and 2016 World Cups of Hockey, the 2006 Torino Italy Olympics, the 2012 Winter Classic, and the 2018 NHL Stadium Series.

Racicot reached his milestone 1500th NHL game on January 23, 2016, when the Tampa Bay Lightning visited the Florida Panthers.

Notably, Racicot officiated on April 5, 2007, when Martin Brodeur broke Bernie Parent's single season wins record with his 48th win. He was also involved in a controversial play during Game 6 of the 2012 Stanley Cup Final in which Pierre accidentally set up a pick on Anton Volchenkov which eventually resulted in a goal for the Los Angeles Kings.
