= Marc Joannette =

Canadian ice hockey official (born 1968)

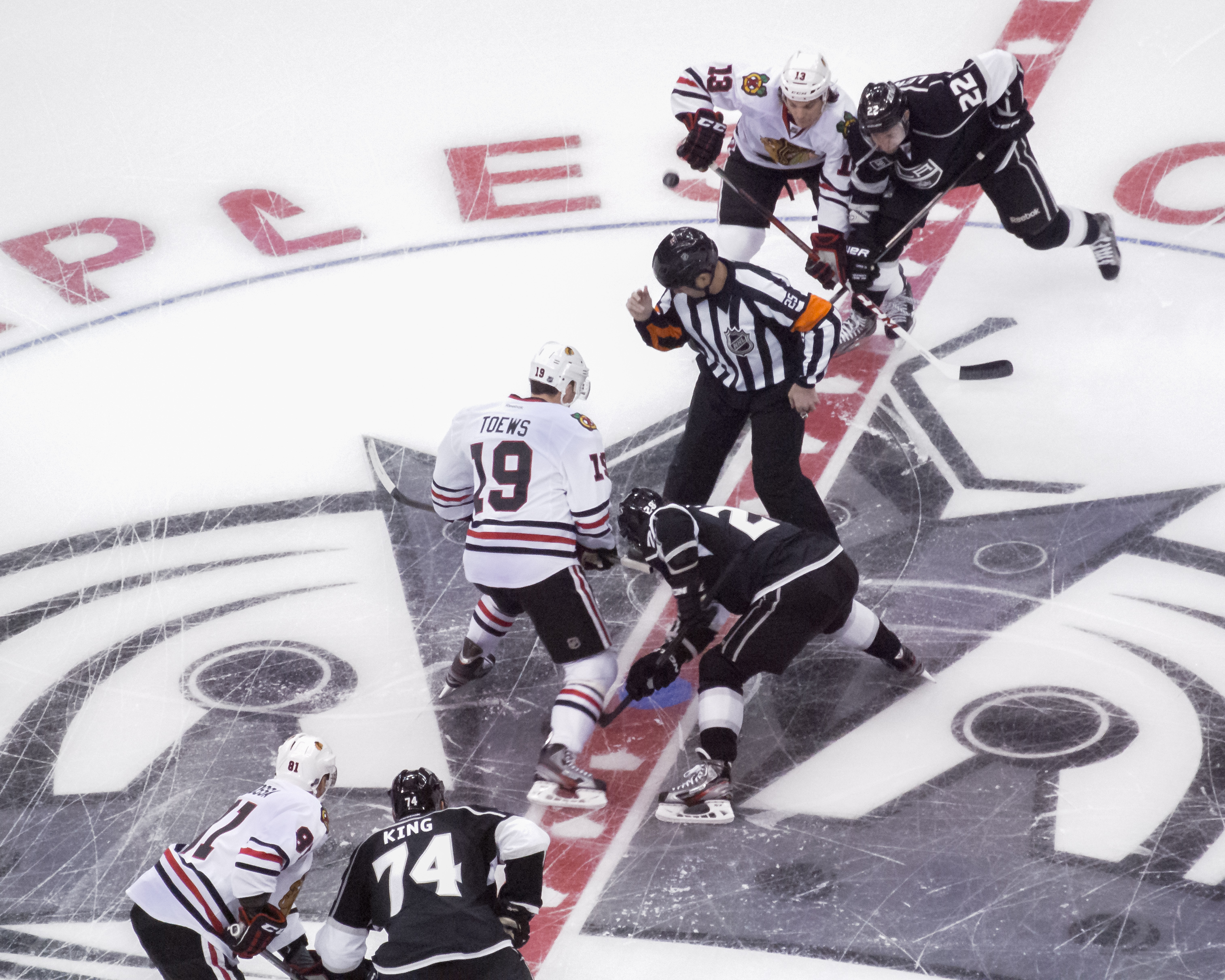
- Former NHL referee Marc Joanette prepares for an opening faceoff in a 2013 NHL Western Conference contest between the Chicago Blackhawks and the Los Angeles Kings.
- Born: November 3, 1968 (age 57); Verdun, Quebec
- Occupation: Former NHL referee

Marc Joannette (born November 3, 1968) is a retired Canadian referee who worked in the National Hockey League (NHL), wearing uniform number 25. By the conclusion of the 2022–23 NHL season, he had officiated 1,520 regular season games and 172 playoff contests. His NHL debut came on October 1, 1999. Notably, he officiated the game on April 6, 2007, when Martin Brodeur surpassed Bernie Parent's record for most wins in a single season with his 48th victory. Joannette was chosen to work the Stanley Cup Final in 2008, 2009, and 2018, and was also selected to officiate men's hockey at the 2010 Winter Olympics in Vancouver.
