= Steve Miller (ice hockey) =

Canadian National Hockey League linesman (born 1972)

- Born: July 22, 1972 (age 52); Stratford, Ontario, Canada
- Position: Linesman
- Playing career: 2000–2022

Steve Miller (born July 22, 1972) is a Canadian National Hockey League linesman who wore #89. Miller retired from officiating in 2022.

== Career ==
Miller began his career in the NHL in 2000. He officiated the 2006 Winter Olympics the NHL All-Star Game, Memorial Cup, World Junior Hockey Championship the 2009, 2010 and 2011 Stanley Cup Finals. Miller retired in March 2022.

Miller worked his 1,000th NHL game on December 12, 2015 between the Buffalo Sabres and Los Angeles Kings at the First Niagara Center in Buffalo, New York. Before the game, Miller was presented a signed hockey stick from both teams and their captains, Brian Gionta and Dustin Brown, respectively.

In 2010, Miller was accused of taking the game-winning puck from the Chicago Blackhawks after they won the Stanley Cup. He was held out of the first round of 2011 playoffs to avoid distractions following an ESPN.com story on the subject, but was re-added to the rotation of officials for the second round.
