= Shane Heyer =

Canadian ice hockey official (born 1964)

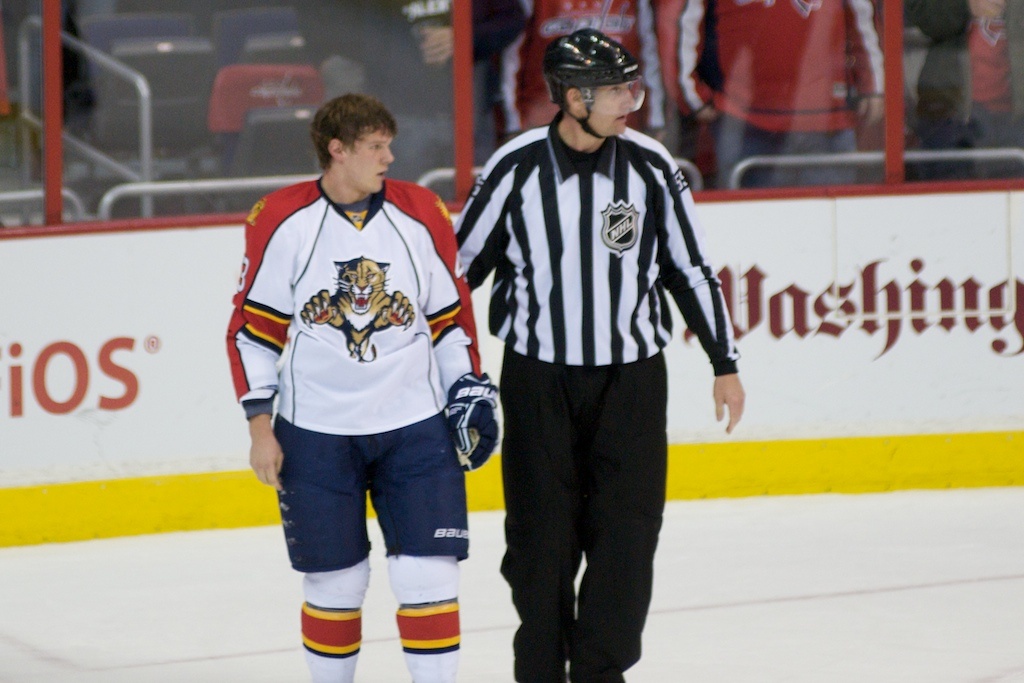
- Heyer escorting Dmitry Kulikov to the penalty box during a game in 2010
- Born: February 7, 1964 (age 62); Summerland, British Columbia
- Occupation: NHL official (1988 – 2018)

Shane Heyer (born February 7, 1964) is a retired National Hockey League (NHL) linesman. He officiated the 2010 Olympics, two World Cup of Hockey tournaments, one NHL All-Star Game, and six Stanley Cup Finals. His career started in the 1988–89 NHL season, and he wore uniform number 55.

Heyer began officiating hockey games at the age of 11, and by 16 was a full-time official in the British Columbia Junior Hockey League. His first regular season NHL game was between the Winnipeg Jets and Vancouver Canucks on October 6, 1988. He officiated a total of 2,016 regular NHL season games, including 386 as a referee. His first NHL playoff game was between the Minnesota North Stars and Chicago Blackhawks on April 18, 1990, and he eventually officiated 214 post-season playoff games, including 2 as a referee.

Heyer was named to the B.C. Hockey Hall of Fame in 2019, a year after his retirement from officiating.
