= Michel Cormier (linesman) =

Canadian ice hockey official

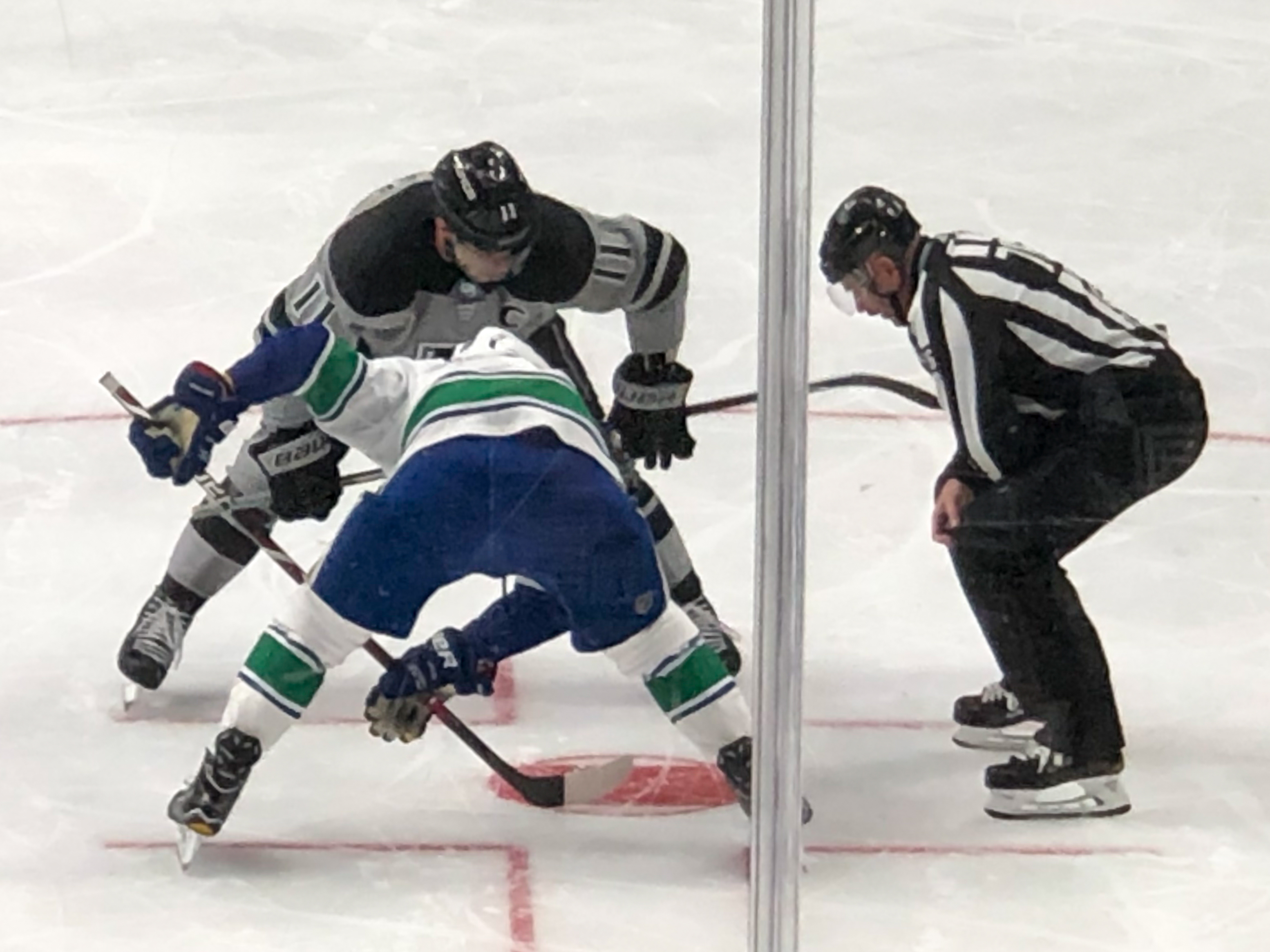
- Cormier officiating a game between the Los Angeles Kings and Vancouver Canucks
- Born: May 28, 1974 (age 51); Trois-Rivières, Quebec, Canada
- Occupation: Ice hockey linesman
- Years active: 2003–present
- Employer: National Hockey League
- Father: Michel Cormier
- Relatives: Jean-Guy Talbot (uncle)

Michel Cormier Jr. (born May 28, 1974) is a linesman in the National Hockey League, recognized by his uniform number 76. He began officiating in the NHL during the 2003–04 season and, by the beginning of the 2024–25 season, had worked in 1,370 regular-season games and 99 playoff matchups, including an appearance in the Stanley Cup Final. Before joining the NHL, Cormier gained experience officiating at major tournaments such as the Memorial Cup and the World Junior Ice Hockey Championship.

== Career ==
Growing up with a strong passion for hockey, Cormier pursued the sport as a junior player, eventually reaching the competitive ranks of the Quebec Major Junior Hockey League (QMJHL). After concluding his playing career, Cormier found himself drawn back to the game, not as a player, but as an official. Motivated by his love for the sport and a desire to remain on the ice, he began training as a linesman. His commitment and skill were quickly recognized, and within a few short years, the QMJHL hired him as a linesman. His talent and consistency earned him high-profile assignments, including officiating at the prestigious 2003 World Junior Hockey Championship and the Memorial Cup. These performances opened the door to the National Hockey League (NHL), where Cormier was offered a full-time position as a referee. He made his NHL debut on October 10, 2003, during a matchup between the Pittsburgh Penguins and the Los Angeles Kings. Demonstrating steady growth and professionalism, Cormier was selected to officiate his first Stanley Cup Playoff game on April 22, 2006, featuring the New York Rangers and the New Jersey Devils. Over the years, his experience and reliability on the ice continued to build, culminating in a significant career milestone on December 2, 2018, when he officiated his 1,000th NHL regular-season game.

== See also ==
- List of NHL on-ice officials
