= Dan O'Halloran =

Canadian ice hockey official (born 1964)

- Born: March 25, 1964 (age 62); Essex, Ontario
- Occupation: NHL referee

Dan O'Halloran (born March 25, 1964, in Essex, Ontario) is a National Hockey League referee, who wears uniform number 13. He was one of the selected referees who officiated the 2007, 2008, 2010, 2011, 2012, 2013, 2014, 2015, 2016, and the 2017 Stanley Cup Final series.

The first NHL game that O'Halloran refereed was on October 14, 1995. O'Halloran reached 1,000 games on April 7, 2013, with the St. Louis Blues playing against the Detroit Red Wings.

He was also selected as one of 13 NHL referees to officiate at the 2010 Winter Olympics in Vancouver, including the gold medal game.
