= List of Nashville Predators records =

This is a list of franchise records for the Nashville Predators of the National Hockey League (updated through May 5, 2025).

== Career regular season leaders ==
=== Skaters ===
Games played
#	Player	GP	Seasons
1	Roman Josi	962	2011–present
2	David Legwand	956	1999–2014
3	Filip Forsberg	780	2013–present
4	Shea Weber	763	2006–2016
5	Martin Erat	723	2001–2013
Active leader
1	Roman Josi	962	2011–present

Goals
#	Player	G	Seasons
1	Filip Forsberg	318	2013–present
2	David Legwand	210	1999–2014
3	Roman Josi	190	2011–present
4	Shea Weber	166	2006–2016
5	Martin Erat	163	2001–2013
Active leader
1	Filip Forsberg	318	2013–present

Assists
#	Player	A	Seasons
1	Roman Josi	534	2011–present
2	Filip Forsberg	363	2013–present
3	David Legwand	356	1999–2014
4	Martin Erat	318	2001–2013
5	Shea Weber	277	2006–2016
Active leader
1	Roman Josi	534	2011–present

Points
#	Player	Pts	Seasons
1	Roman Josi	724	2011–present
2	Filip Forsberg	681	2013–present
3	David Legwand	566	1999–2014
4	Martin Erat	481	2001–2013
5	Shea Weber	443	2006–2016
Active leader
1	Roman Josi	724	2011–present

Penalties in minutes
#	Player	PIM	Seasons
1	Jordin Tootoo	725	2003–2012
2	Scott Hartnell	626	2000–2007, 2017–2018
3	Shea Weber	568	2006–2016
4	David Legwand	474	1999–2014
5	Scott Walker	465	1998–2006
Active leader
8	Roman Josi	399	2011–present

Power play goals
#	Player	PPG	Seasons
1	Filip Forsberg	85	2013–present
2	Shea Weber	80	2006–2016
3	Roman Josi	65	2011–present
4	Kimmo Timonen	46	1998–2007
5	Craig Smith	42	2011–2020
5	Martin Erat	42	2001–2013
Active leader
1	Filip Forsberg	85	2013–present

Shorthanded goals
#	Player	SHG	Seasons
1	Greg Johnson	11	1998–2006
2	Viktor Arvidsson	10	2015–2021
2	David Legwand	10	1999–2014
4	Calle Järnkrok	8	2014–2021
4	Scott Walker	8	1998–2006
Active leader
T–8	Filip Forsberg	6	2013–present

Game winning goals
#	Player	GWG	Seasons
1	Filip Forsberg	57	2013–present
2	David Legwand	41	1999–2014
3	Roman Josi	35	2011–present
4	Martin Erat	26	2001–2013
5	Viktor Arvidsson	25	2015–2021
Active leader
1	Filip Forsberg	57	2013–present

Overtime goals
#	Player	OTG	Seasons
1	Filip Forsberg	11	2013–present
2	Roman Josi	9	2011–present
2	David Legwand	9	1999–2014
4	Shea Weber	7	2006–2016
5	Matt Duchene	4	2019–2023
Active leader
1	Filip Forsberg	11	2013–present

Highest +/-
#	Player	+	Seasons
1	Ryan Ellis	114	2011–2021
2	Mattias Ekholm	104	2011–2023
3	Craig Smith	67	2011–2020
4	Roman Josi	59	2011–present
4	Calle Järnkrok	59	2014–2021
Active leader
T-4	Roman Josi	59	2011–present

Points per game
#	Player	PPG	Seasons
1	Paul Kariya	.98	2005–2007
2	Filip Forsberg	.87	2013–present
3	Jason Arnott	.83	2006–2010
3	Steve Sullivan	.83	2004–2011
3	Yanic Perreault	.83	2005–2006
Active leader
2	Filip Forsberg	.87	2013–present

=== Goaltenders ===
Games played
#	Player	GP	Seasons
1	Pekka Rinne	683	2005–2021
2	Juuse Saros	408	2015–present
3	Tomáš Vokoun	383	1998–2007
4	Mike Dunham	217	1998–2002
5	Chris Mason	146	1999–2001, 2003–2008, 2012–2013
Active leader
2	Juuse Saros	408	2015–present

Wins
#	Player	W	Seasons
1	Pekka Rinne	369	2005–2021
2	Juuse Saros	202	2015–present
3	Tomáš Vokoun	161	1998–2007
4	Mike Dunham	81	1998–2002
5	Chris Mason	59	1999–2001, 2003–2008, 2012–2013
Active leader
2	Juuse Saros	202	2015–present

Losses
#	Player	L	Seasons
1	Pekka Rinne	213	2005–2021
2	Tomáš Vokoun	159	1998–2007
3	Juuse Saros	150	2015–present
4	Mike Dunham	104	1998–2002
5	Chris Mason	50	1999–2001, 2003–2008, 2012–2013
Active leader
3	Juuse Saros	150	2015–present

Goals against average
#	Player	GAA	Seasons
1	Pekka Rinne	2.43	2005–2021
2	Tomáš Vokoun	2.54	1998–2007
3	Carter Hutton	2.55	2013–2016
4	Dan Ellis	2.64	2007–2010
5	Juuse Saros	2.68	2015–present
5	Chris Mason	2.68	1999–2001, 2003–2008, 2012–2013
Active leader
T-5	Juuse Saros	2.68	2015–present

- Minimum 50 games

Save percentage
#	Player	SV%	Seasons
1	Pekka Rinne	.917	2005–2021
2	Juuse Saros	.914	2015–present
3	Tomáš Vokoun	.913	1998–2007
4	Dan Ellis	.912	2007–2010
5	3 tied	.910	––
Active leader
2	Juuse Saros	.914	2015–present

- Minimum 50 games

Shutouts
#	Player	SO	Seasons
1	Pekka Rinne	60	2005–2021
2	Juuse Saros	27	2015–present
3	Tomáš Vokoun	21	1998–2007
4	Chris Mason	12	1999–2001, 2003–2008, 2012–2013
5	Dan Ellis	10	2007–2010
Active leader
2	Juuse Saros	27	2015–present

== Single season records ==
=== Skaters ===
Goals
#	Player	G	Season
1	Filip Forsberg	48	2023–24
2	Matt Duchene	43	2021–22
3	Filip Forsberg	42	2021–22
4	Viktor Arvidsson	34	2018–19
5	Filip Forsberg	33	2015–16
5	Jason Arnott	33	2008–09

Assists
#	Player	A	Season
1	Roman Josi	73	2021–22
2	Roman Josi	62	2023–24
3	Paul Kariya	54	2005–06
4	Mikael Granlund	53	2021–22
5	Gustav Nyquist	52	2023–24
5	Paul Kariya	52	2006–07

Points
#	Player	Pts	Season
1	Roman Josi	96	2021–22
2	Filip Forsberg	94	2023–24
3	Matt Duchene	86	2021–22
4	Roman Josi	85	2023–24
4	Paul Kariya	85	2005–06

Points (defenseman)
#	Player	Pts	Season
1	Roman Josi	96	2021–22
2	Roman Josi	85	2023–24
3	Roman Josi	65	2018–19
4	Roman Josi	61	2015–16
5	Roman Josi	59	2022–23
5	P.K. Subban	59	2017–18

Points (rookie)
#	Player	Pts	Season
1	Filip Forsberg	63	2014–15
2	Tanner Jeannot	41	2021–22
3	Luke Evangelista	39	2023–24
4	Alexander Radulov	37	2006–07
5	Craig Smith	36	2011–12

Penalties in minutes
#	Player	PIM	Season
1	Patrick Côté	242	1998–99
2	Denny Lambert	218	1998–99
3	Richard Clune	166	2013–14
4	Darcy Hordichuk	163	2005–06
5	Mark Borowiecki	151	2021–22

Highest +/-
#	Player	+	Seasons
1	Filip Forsberg	27	2017–18
1	James Neal	27	2015–16
1	Mattias Ekholm	27	2018–19
1	Nick Bonino	27	2018–19
5	Alexandre Carrier	26	2021–22
5	Ryan Ellis	26	2017–18

=== Goaltenders ===
Games played
#	Player	GP	Season
1	Tomáš Vokoun	73	2003–04
1	Pekka Rinne	73	2011–12
3	Tomáš Vokoun	69	2002–03
4	Juuse Saros	67	2021–22
5	Pekka Rinne	66	2015–16

Wins
#	Player	W	Season
1	Pekka Rinne	43	2011–12
2	Pekka Rinne	42	2017–18
3	Pekka Rinne	41	2014–15
4	Juuse Saros	38	2021–22
5	Tomáš Vokoun	36	2005–06

Losses
#	Player	L	Season
1	Tomáš Vokoun	31	2002–03
1	Juuse Saros	31	2024–25
3	Tomáš Vokoun	29	2003–04
4	Mike Dunham	27	1999–2000
5	Juuse Saros	25	2021–22

Goals against average
#	Player	GAA	Season
1	Pekka Rinne	2.12	2010–11
2	Pekka Rinne	2.18	2014–15
3	Tomáš Vokoun	2.20	2002–03
4	Juuse Saros	2.28	2020–21
4	Mike Dunham	2.28	2000–01

Save percentage
#	Player	SV%	Season
1	Pekka Rinne	.930	2010–11
2	Juuse Saros	.927	2020–21
2	Pekka Rinne	.927	2017–18
4	Chris Mason	.925	2006–07
4	Juuse Saros	.925	2017–18

Shutouts
#	Player	SO	Season
1	Pekka Rinne	8	2017–18
2	Pekka Rinne	7	2008–09
2	Pekka Rinne	7	2009–10
4	Dan Ellis	6	2007–08
4	Pekka Rinne	6	2010–11

== Career playoff leaders ==
=== Skaters ===
Games played
#	Player	GP	Seasons
1	Roman Josi	91	2011–present
2	Filip Forsberg	81	2013–present
3	Mattias Ekholm	75	2011–2023
4	Ryan Ellis	74	2011–2021
5	Colton Sissons	71	2014–2025
5	Mike Fisher	71	2011–2018
Active leader
1	Roman Josi	91	2011–present

Goals
#	Player	G	Seasons
1	Filip Forsberg	31	2013–present
2	Ryan Johansen	17	2016–2023
3	James Neal	14	2014–2017
4	Shea Weber	13	2006–2016
4	David Legwand	13	1999–2014
Active leader
1	Filip Forsberg	31	2013–present

Assists
#	Player	A	Seasons
1	Roman Josi	33	2011–present
2	Ryan Johansen	31	2016–2023
2	Ryan Ellis	31	2011–2021
4	Mattias Ekholm	29	2011–2023
5	Filip Forsberg	28	2013–present
Active leader
1	Roman Josi	33	2011–present

Points
#	Player	Pts	Seasons
1	Filip Forsberg	59	2013–present
2	Ryan Johansen	48	2016–2023
3	Roman Josi	45	2011–present
4	Ryan Ellis	38	2011–2021
5	Mattias Ekholm	35	2011–2023
Active leader
1	Filip Forsberg	59	2013–present

Penalties in minutes
#	Player	PIM	Seasons
1	Mattias Ekholm	74	2011–2023
2	Jordin Tootoo	63	2003–2012
3	Shea Weber	57	2006–2016
4	Ryan Johansen	50	2016–2023
5	Roman Josi	48	2011–present
5	Austin Watson	48	2013–2020
Active leader
T–5	Roman Josi	48	2011–present

=== Goaltenders ===
Games played
#	Player	GP	Seasons
1	Pekka Rinne	89	2005–2021
2	Juuse Saros	23	2015–present
3	Tomáš Vokoun	11	1998–2007
4	Dan Ellis	6	2007–2010
5	Chris Mason	5	1999–2001, 2003–2008, 2012–2013
Active leader
2	Juuse Saros	23	2015–present

Wins
1	Pekka Rinne	45	2005–2021
2	Juuse Saros	5	2015–present
3	Tomáš Vokoun	3	1998–2007
4	Dan Ellis	2	2007–2010
5	Chris Mason	1	1999–2001, 2003–2008, 2012–2013
Active leader
2	Juuse Saros	5	2015–present

Losses
#	Player	L	Seasons
1	Pekka Rinne	44	2005–2021
2	Juuse Saros	11	2015–present
3	Tomáš Vokoun	8	1998–2007
4	Dan Ellis	4	2007–2010
4	Chris Mason	4	1999–2001, 2003–2008, 2012–2013
Active leader
2	Juuse Saros	11	2015–present

Goals against average
#	Player	GAA	Seasons
1	Juuse Saros	2.45	2015–present
2	Tomáš Vokoun	2.47	1998–2007
3	Pekka Rinne	2.49	2005–2021
4	Dan Ellis	2.52	2007–2010
5	Chris Mason	3.45	1999–2001, 2003–2008, 2012–2013
Active leader
1	Juuse Saros	2.45	2015–present

Save percentage
#	Player	SV%	Seasons
1	Dan Ellis	.938	2007–2010
2	Tomáš Vokoun	.922	1998–2007
3	Pekka Rinne	.914	2005–2021
4	Juuse Saros	.911	2015–present
5	Chris Mason	.901	1999–2001, 2003–2008, 2012–2013
Active leader
4	Juuse Saros	.911	2015–present

Shutouts
#	Player	SO	Seasons
1	Pekka Rinne	5	2005–2021
2	Tomáš Vokoun	1	1998–2007
Active leader
N/A	--	--	--

=== Single season ===
- Goals: Filip Forsberg, 9 (2016–17)
- Assists: Ryan Johansen; Viktor Arvidsson; Mattias Ekholm; P. K. Subban, 10 (2016–17)
- Points: Filip Forsberg, 16 (2016–17, 2017–18)
- Wins: Pekka Rinne, 14 (2016–17)

== Team ==
=== Single season ===
- Points: 117 (2017–18)
- Wins: 53 (2017–18)
- Losses: 47 (1998–99)
- Goals scored: 266 (2006-07 & 2023–24)

== See also ==
- List of Nashville Predators players
- List of Nashville Predators seasons
