= List of Nashville Predators players =

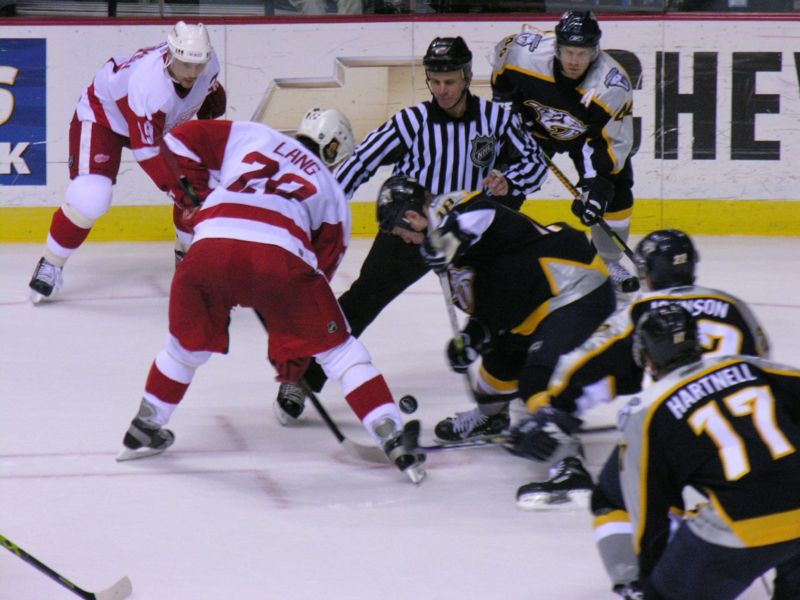
The Predators during a game against the Detroit Red Wings in 2006

The Nashville Predators are a professional ice hockey team based in Nashville, Tennessee. They are members of the Central Division of the Western Conference of the National Hockey League (NHL). The team was founded as an expansion franchise in 1997, and played their first game during the 1998–99 season. At the end of the 2018–19 season, 280 players, 17 goaltenders and 263 skaters (forwards and defenseman), have played at least one game for Predators in the regular or post-season.

== Key ==
- * Appeared in a Predators game during the 2025–26 season.

Abbreviations
GP	Games played
HHOF	Elected to the Hockey Hall of Fame

Goaltenders
W	Wins
SO	Shutouts
L	Losses
GAA	Goals against average
T	Ties
OTL ^{a}	Overtime losses
SV%	Save percentage

Skaters
Pos	Position	RW	Right wing	A	Assists
D	Defenseman	C	Center	P	Points
LW	Left wing	G	Goals	PIM	Penalty minutes

The "Seasons" column lists the first year of the season of the player's first game and the last year of the season of the player's last game. For example, a player who played one game in the 2000–2001 season would be listed as playing with the team from 2000–2001, regardless of what calendar year the game occurred within.

Statistics complete as of the 2025–2026 NHL season.

== Goaltenders ==
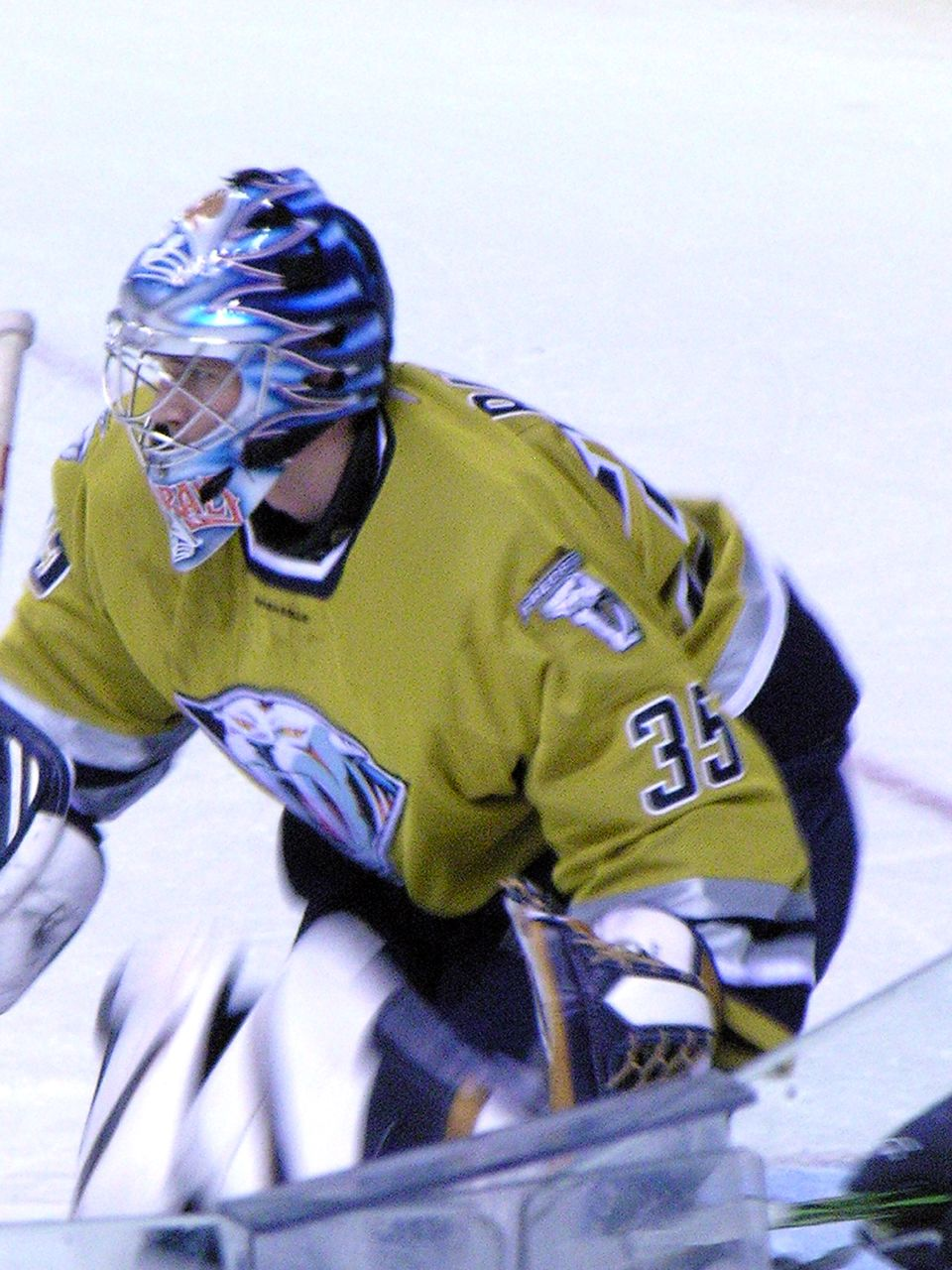
Pekka Rinne.

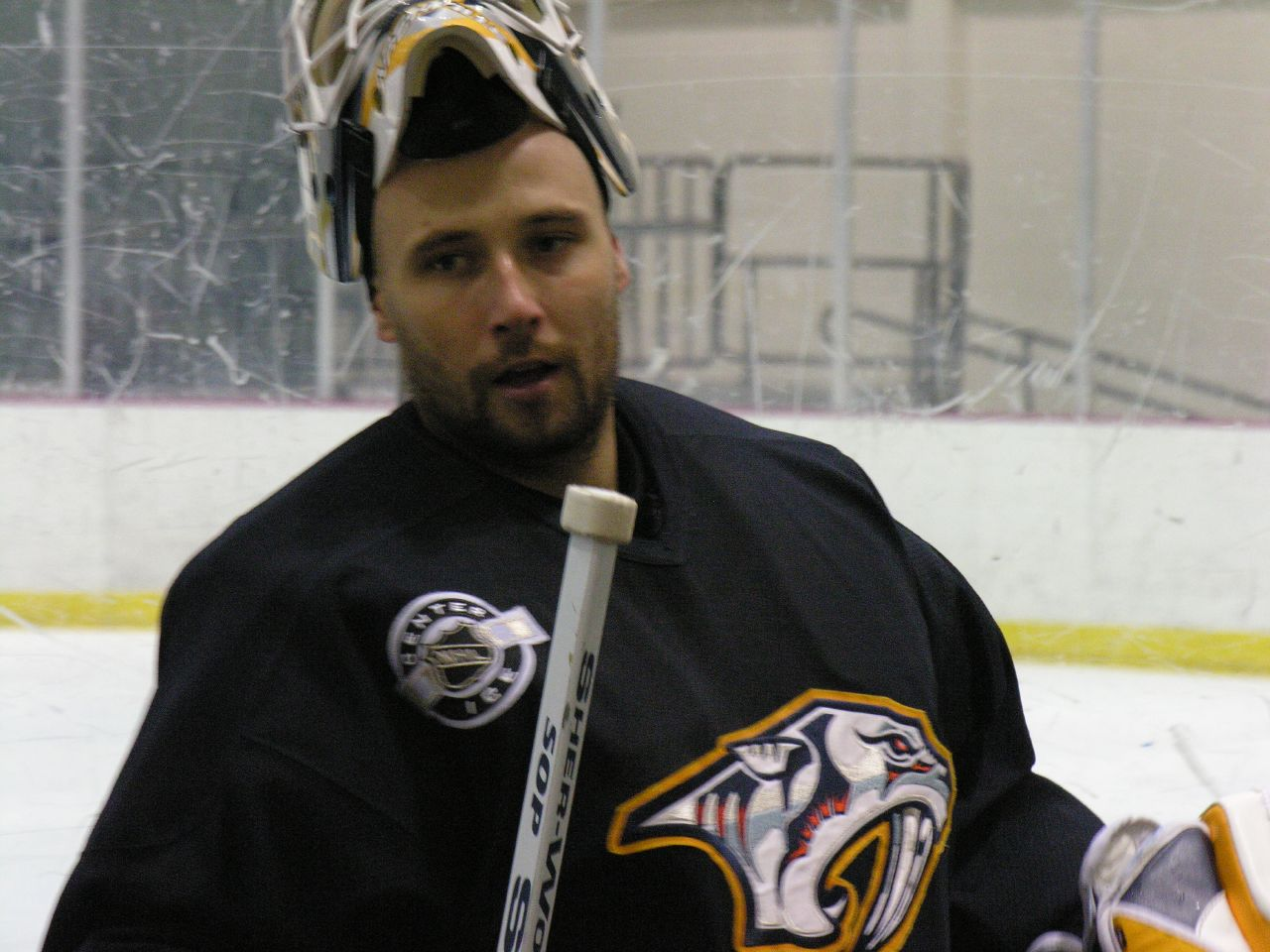
Tomas Vokoun.

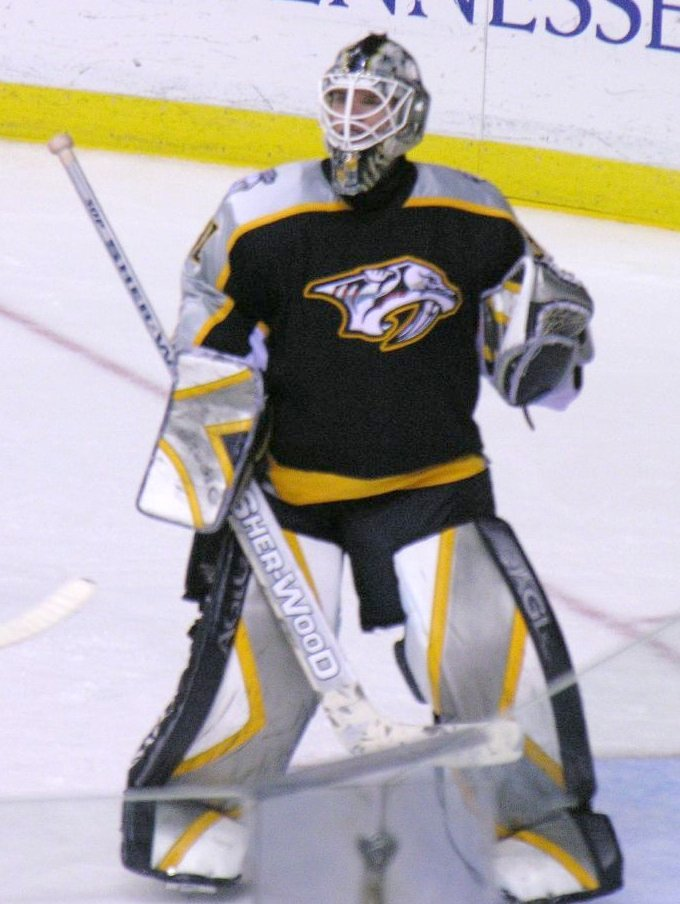
Chris Mason.

Name	Nationality	Seasons	GP	W	L	T	OTL	SO	GAA	SV%	GP	W	L	SO	GAA	SV%	Notes
Name	Nationality	Seasons	Regular season								Playoffs						Notes
Justus Annunen*	Finland	2024–2026	51	19	23	—	3	1	2.90	.897	—	—	—	—	—	—	
Yaroslav Askarov	Russia	2022–2024	3	1	1	—	0	0	2.58	.914	—	—	—	—	—	—	
Mark Dekanich	Canada	2010–2011	1	0	0	—	0	0	3.60	.880	—	—	—	—	—	—	
Devan Dubnyk	Canada	2013–2014	2	0	1	—	1	0	4.35	.850	—	—	—	—	—	—	
Mike Dunham	United States	1998–2003	217	81	104	24	—	14	2.72	.910	—	—	—	—	—	—	
Dan Ellis	Canada	2007–2010	110	49	42	—	8	10	2.64	.912	6	2	4	0	2.52	.938	
Eric Fichaud	Canada	1998–1999	9	0	6	0	—	0	3.22	.895	—	—	—	—	—	—	
Brian Finley	Canada	2002–2003; 2005–2006	2	0	1	0	0	0	5.61	.815	—	—	—	—	—	—	
Wade Flaherty	Canada	2002–2003	1	0	1	0	—	0	4.71	.852	—	—	—	—	—	—	
Magnus Hellberg	Sweden	2013–2015	1	0	0	—	0	0	5.00	.750	—	—	—	—	—	—	
Carter Hutton	Canada	2013–2016	75	33	23	—	12	4	2.55	.910	3	0	0	0	3.00	.667	
Connor Ingram	Canada	2021–2022	3	1	2	—	0	0	3.71	.879	4	0	3	0	3.64	.913	
Kasimir Kaskisuo	Finland	2020–2021	1	0	0	—	0	0	0.00	1.000	—	—	—	—	—	—	
Kevin Lankinen	Finland	2022–2024	43	20	14	—	1	1	2.79	.912	—	—	—	—	—	—	
Jan Lasak	Slovakia	2001–2003	6	0	4	0	—	0	4.04	.874	—	—	—	—	—	—	
Michael Leighton	Canada	2006–2007	1	0	0	—	0	0	6.32	.800	—	—	—	—	—	—	
Anders Lindback	Sweden	2010–2012	38	16	13	—	2	2	2.53	.914	—	—	—	—	—	—	
Chris Mason	Canada	1998–2008; 2012–2013	146	59	50	1	12	12	2.68	.910	5	1	4	0	3.45	.901	
Marek Mazanec	Czech Republic	2013–2017	31	8	13	—	4	2	2.98	.895	—	—	—	—	—	—	
Pekka Rinne	Finland	2005–2021	683	369	213	—	75	60	2.43	.917	89	45	44	5	2.49	.914	
David Rittich	Czech Republic	2021–2022	17	6	3	—	4	0	3.57	.886	1	0	1	0	19.91	.615	
Juuse Saros*	Finland	2015–2026	467	230	172	—	46	27	2.74	.914	23	5	11	0	2.45	.911	
Tomas Vokoun	Czech Republic	1998–2007	447	161	159	35	11	21	2.54	.913	11	3	8	1	2.50	.922	
Scott Wedgewood	Canada	2024–2025	5	1	2	—	1	0	3.69	.878	—	—	—	—	—	—	

== Skaters ==
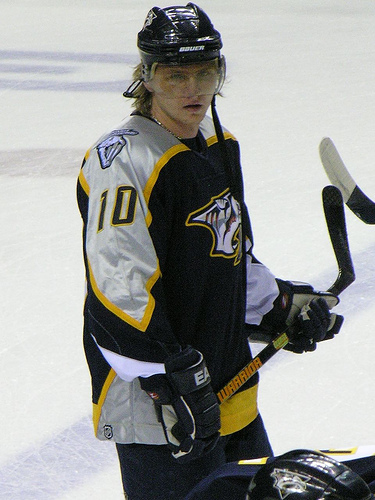
Martin Erat

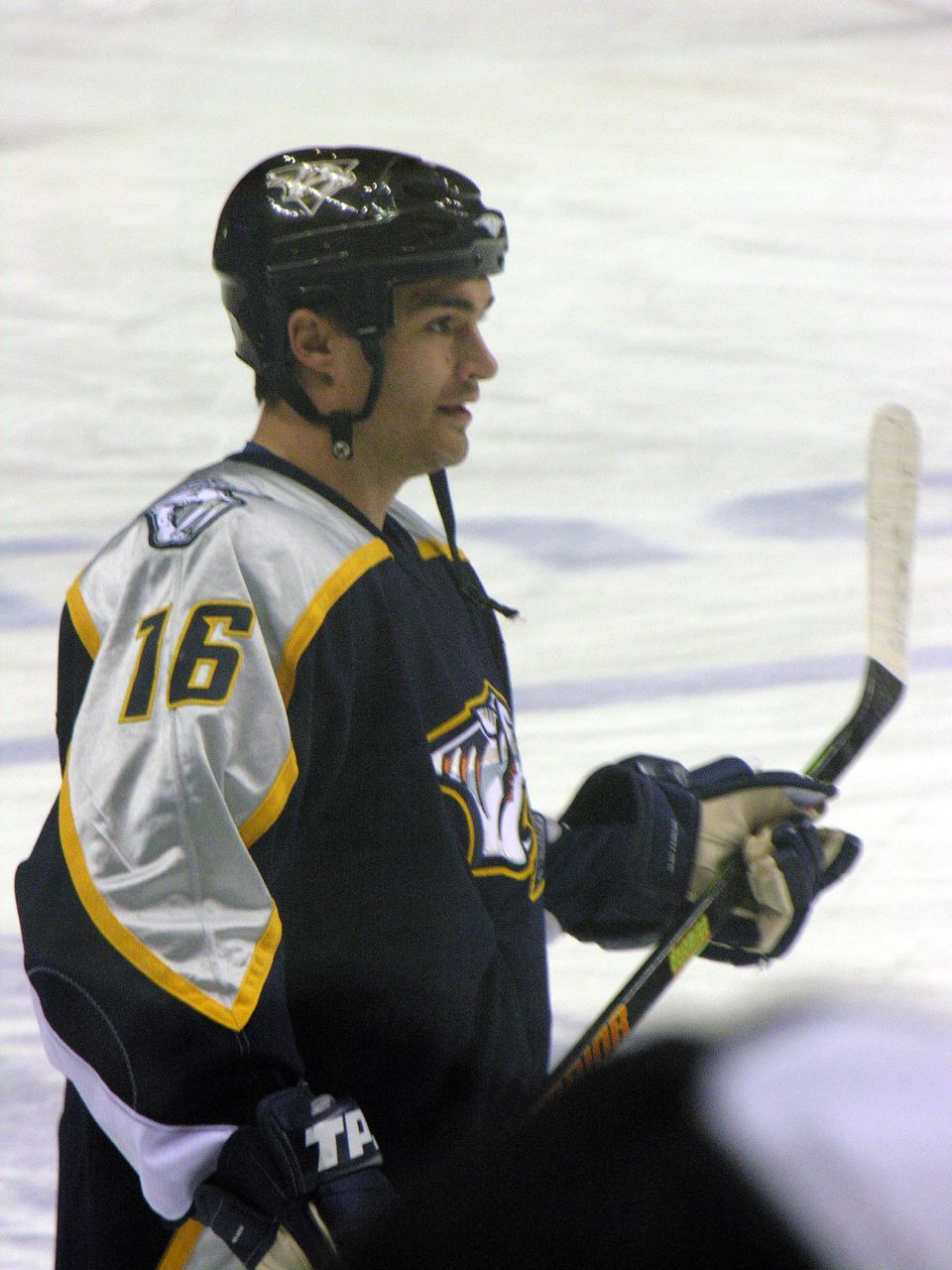
Darcy Hordichuk

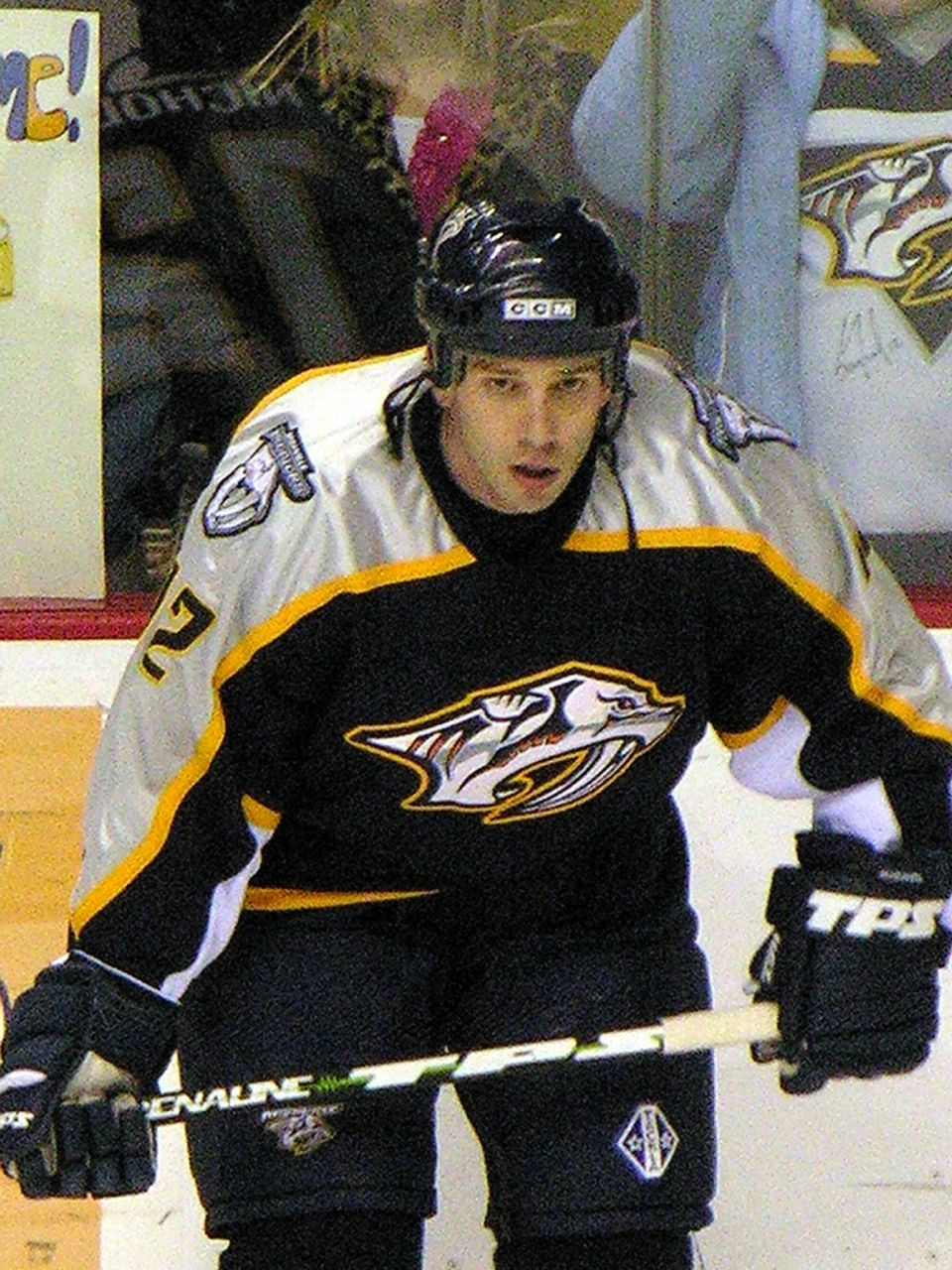
Scott Nichol

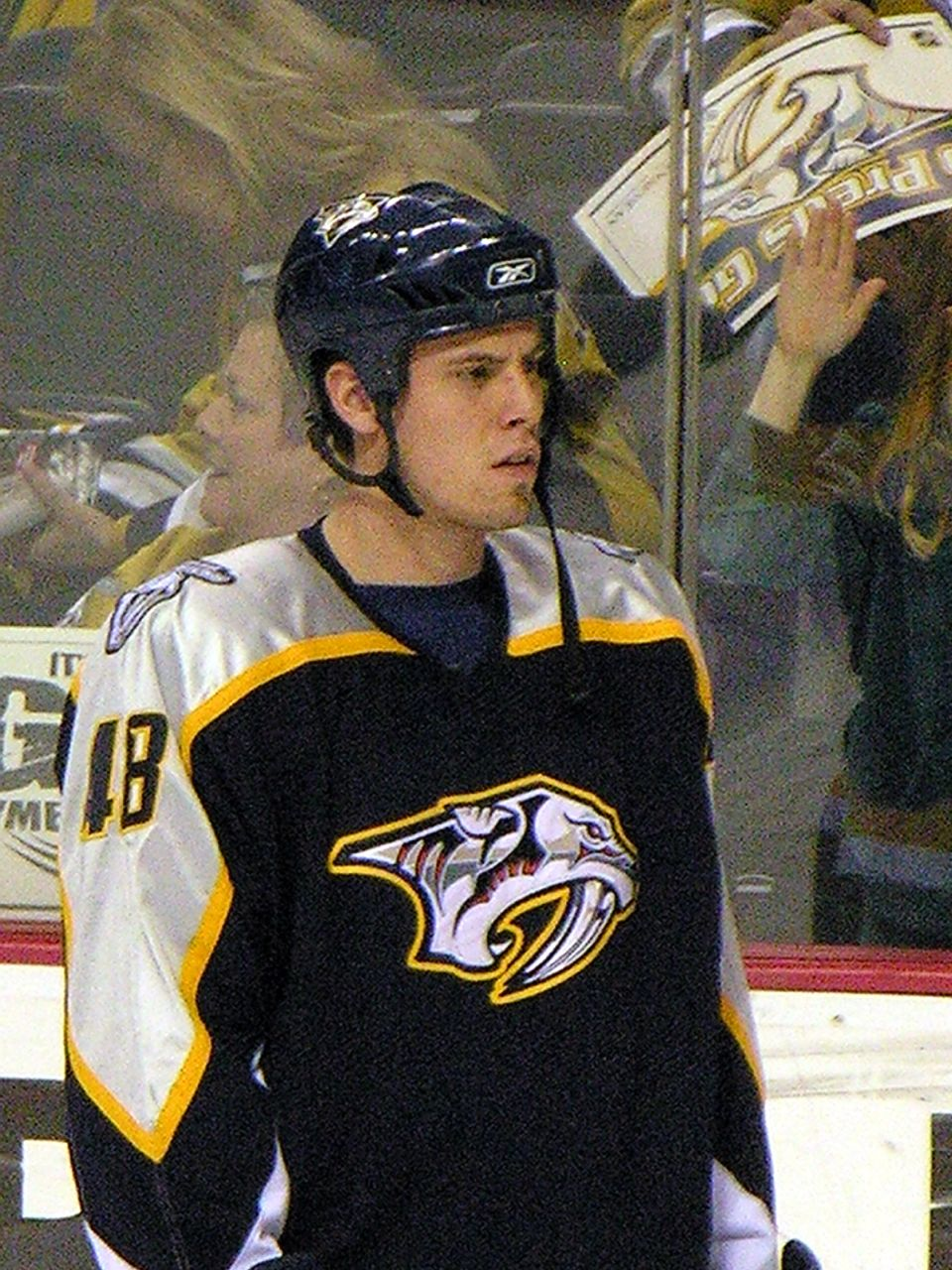
Shea Weber

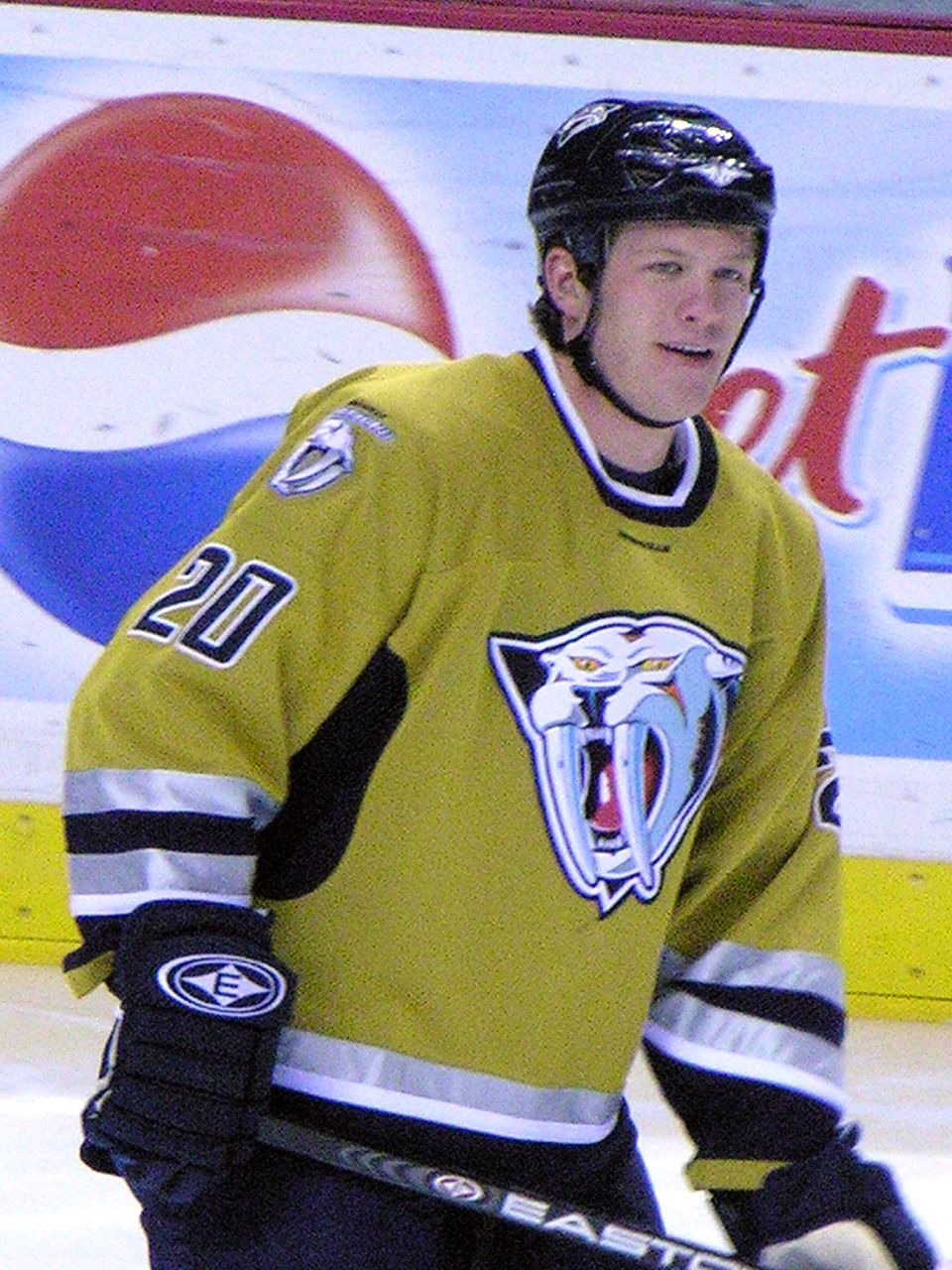
Ryan Suter

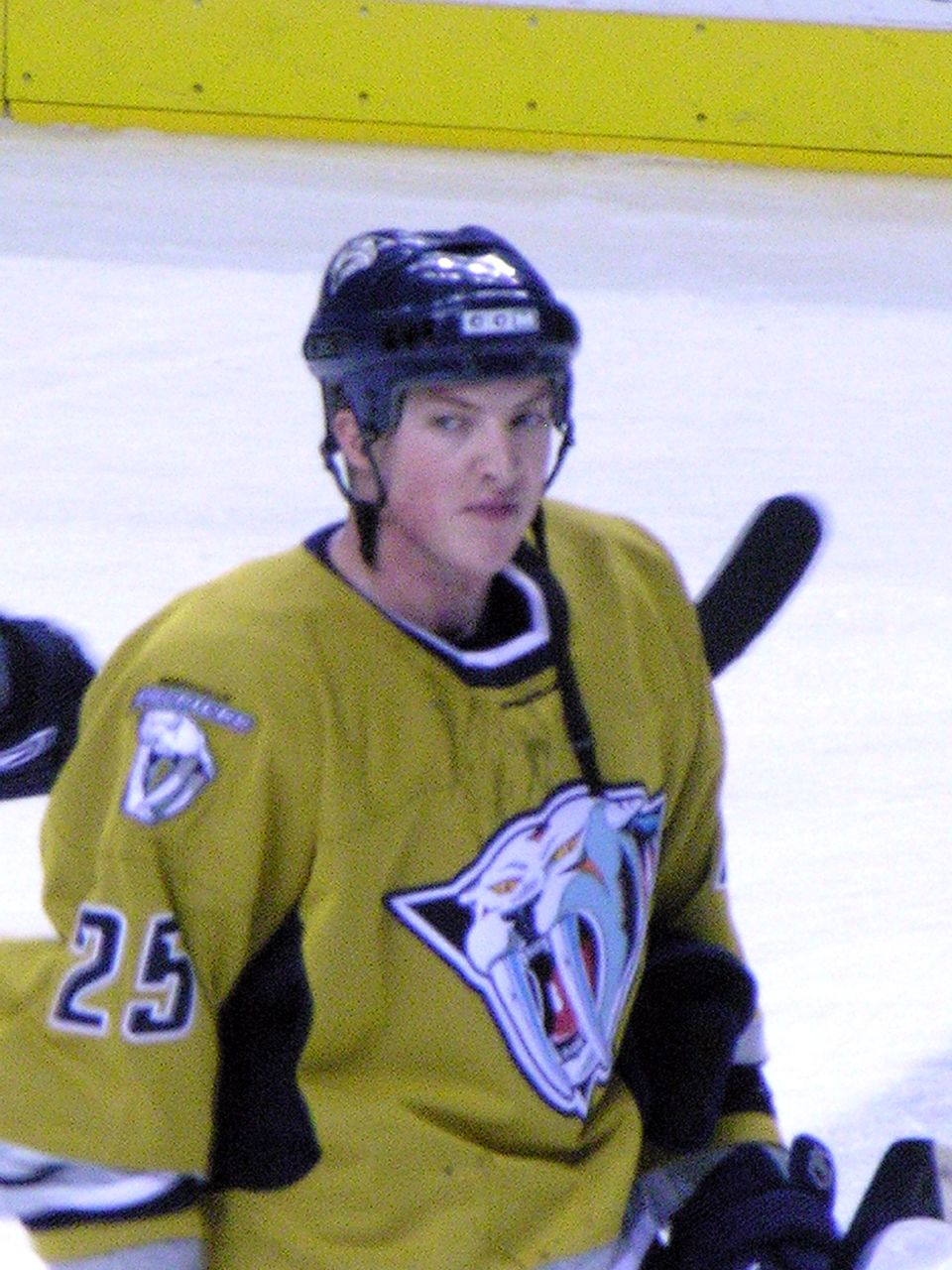
Jerred Smithson

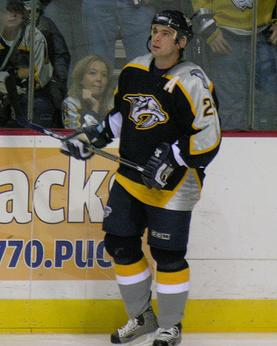
Steve Sullivan

Name	Nationality	Pos	Seasons	GP	G	A	P	PIM	GP	G	A	P	PIM	Notes
Name	Nationality	Pos	Seasons	Regular season					Playoffs					Notes
Pontus Aberg	Sweden	LW	2015—2018	52	3	7	10	12	18	2	3	5	2	
Ramzi Abid	Canada	LW	2006—2007	13	1	4	5	13	2	0	0	0	0	
Egor Afanasyev	Russia	LW	2022—2024	19	1	0	1	2	—	—	—	—	—	
Frederic Allard	Canada	D	2020—2021	1	0	0	0	0	—	—	—	—	—	
Jamie Allison	Canada	D	2003—2006	67	0	4	4	121	—	—	—	—	—	
Jaret Anderson-Dolan	Canada	C	2023—2024	1	0	0	0	0	—	—	—	—	—	
Jonas Andersson	Sweden	RW	2001—2002	5	0	0	0	2	—	—	—	—	—	
Niklas Andersson	Sweden	LW	1999—2000	7	0	1	1	0	—	—	—	—	—	
Mark Arcobello	Canada	C	2014—2015	4	1	0	1	0	—	—	—	—	—	
Denis Arkhipov	Russia	C	2000—2004	273	46	65	111	74	—	—	—	—	—	
Jason Arnott	Canada	C	2006—2010	275	107	122	229	177	15	5	1	6	6	Captain, 2007—2010
Viktor Arvidsson	Sweden	RW	2014—2021	385	127	112	239	172	61	12	15	27	39	
Rasmus Asplund	Sweden	F	2022—2023	19	0	0	0	4	—	—	—	—	—	
Blair Atcheynum	Canada	RW	1998—1999	53	8	6	14	16	—	—	—	—	—	
Daniel Bang	Sweden	LW	2012—2013	8	0	2	2	0	—	—	—	—	—	
Tyson Barrie	Canada	D	2022—2024	65	4	23	27	26	1	0	1	1	0	
Justin Barron*	Canada	D	2024—2026	97	5	16	21	32	—	—	—	—	—	
Victor Bartley	Canada	D	2012—2015	111	1	22	23	55	4	0	0	0	2	
Cody Bass	Canada	C	2015—2017	26	0	0	0	36	—	—	—	—	—	
Anthony Beauvillier	Canada	LW	2023—2024	15	1	2	3	2	6	1	1	2	2	
Taylor Beck	Canada	LW	2012—2015	85	11	12	23	26	5	0	0	0	2	
Kris Beech	Canada	C	2005—2006	5	1	2	3	0	—	—	—	—	—	
Steve Begin	Canada	LW	2010—2011	2	0	0	0	4	—	—	—	—	—	
Wade Belak	Canada	RW	2008—2011	92	0	4	4	130	—	—	—	—	—	
Kieffer Bellows	United States	LW	2024—2025	19	2	2	4	6	—	—	—	—	—	
Matt Benning	Canada	D	2020—2022	118	1	14	15	69	8	0	1	1	6	
Drake Berehowsky	Canada	D	1998—2001	219	20	53	73	327	—	—	—	—	—	
Niclas Bergfors	Sweden	RW	2011—2012	11	1	1	2	2	—	—	—	—	—	
Anthony Bitetto	United States	D	2014—2019	114	2	17	19	86	14	0	0	0	6	
Colin Blackwell	United States	C	2018—2020	33	3	7	10	12	—	—	—	—	—	
Nick Blankenburg*	United States	D	2024—2026	109	10	27	37	34	—	—	—	—	—	
Jonathon Blum	United States	D	2010—2013	91	7	15	22	20	12	0	2	2	0	
Brandon Bochenski	United States	RW	2007—2008	8	1	2	3	0	3	0	0	0	0	
Alexandre Boikov	Russia	D	1999—2001	10	0	0	0	15	—	—	—	—	—	
Brad Bombardir	Canada	D	2003—2004	13	0	0	0	4	6	0	1	1	2	
Nick Bonino	Canada	C	2017—2020	219	47	48	95	54	23	3	5	8	13	
Radek Bonk	Czech Republic	C	2007—2009	145	23	31	54	74	6	1	0	1	2	
Sebastien Bordeleau	Canada	C	1998—2001	146	28	40	68	70	—	—	—	—	—	
Mark Borowiecki	Canada	D	2020—2023	83	0	5	5	201	2	0	0	0	0	
Joel Bouchard	Canada	D	1998—2000	116	5	15	20	83	—	—	—	—	—	
Reid Boucher	United States	C	2016—2017	3	1	0	1	0	—	—	—	—	—	
Bob Boughner	Canada	D	1998—2000	141	5	14	19	234	—	—	—	—	—	
Francis Bouillon	United States	D	2002—2003; 2009—2012	195	8	24	32	112	16	0	3	3	8	
Gabriel Bourque	Canada	LW	2011—2016	220	30	44	74	28	15	3	2	5	6	
Zach Boychuk	Canada	LW	2012—2013	5	1	1	2	4	—	—	—	—	—	
Dustin Boyd	Canada	C	2009—2010	18	3	2	5	4	4	0	0	0	0	
Brian Boyle	United States	C	2018—2019	26	5	0	5	16	3	0	2	2	2	
Rich Brennan	United States	D	2001—2002	4	0	0	0	2	—	—	—	—	—	
Sheldon Brookbank	Canada	D	2006—2007	3	0	1	1	12	—	—	—	—	—	
Wade Brookbank	Canada	D	2003—2004	9	0	0	0	38	—	—	—	—	—	
Andrew Brunette	Canada	LW	1998—1999	77	11	20	31	26	—	—	—	—	—	
Michael Bunting*	Canada	LW	2024—2026	79	18	22	40	36	—	—	—	—	—	
Bobby Butler	Canada	RW	2012—2013	20	3	6	9	4	—	—	—	—	—	
Matt Carle	United States	D	2016—2017	6	0	1	1	0	—	—	—	—	—	
Daniel Carr	Canada	LW	2019—2020	11	1	0	1	4	—	—	—	—	—	
Alexandre Carrier	Canada	D	2016—2017; 2019—2025	245	11	58	69	171	16	1	7	8	6	
Marian Cisar	Slovakia	LW	1999—2002	73	13	17	30	57	—	—	—	—	—	
Greg Classen	Canada	C	2000—2003	90	7	10	17	48	—	—	—	—	—	
Richard Clune	Canada	LW	2012—2015	106	7	9	18	48	—	—	—	—	—	
Patrick Cote	Canada	LW	1998—2000	91	1	2	3	312	—	—	—	—	—	
Nick Cousins	Canada	C	2020—2022	120	14	26	40	72	7	2	0	2	2	
Phil Crowe	Canada	RW	1999—2000	4	0	0	0	10	—	—	—	—	—	
Matt Cullen	United States	C	2013—2015	139	17	47	64	48	6	1	1	2	4	
J. J. Daigneault	Canada	D	1998—1999	35	2	2	4	38	—	—	—	—	—	
Jeff Daniels	Canada	D	1998—1999	9	1	3	4	2	—	—	—	—	—	
Mathieu Darche	Canada	D	2003—2004	2	0	0	0	0	—	—	—	—	—	
Jérémy Davies	Canada	D	2020—2022	22	0	3	3	10	—	—	—	—	—	
Greg de Vries	Canada	D	1998—1999; 2007—2009	154	5	15	20	140	6	1	0	1	2	
Marc Del Gaizo	United States	D	2023—2025	55	2	10	12	23	—	—	—	—	—	
Andy Delmore	Canada	D	2001—2003	144	34	38	72	50	—	—	—	—	—	
Michael Del Zotto	Canada	D	2013—2014	25	1	4	5	8	—	—	—	—	—	
Phillip Di Giuseppe	Canada	LW	2018—2019	3	0	0	0	0	—	—	—	—	—	
Matt Donovan	United States	D	2018—2019	2	0	1	1	2	—	—	—	—	—	
Matt Duchene	Canada	C	2019—2023	249	84	113	197	100	14	5	4	9	4	
Steve Dubinsky	Canada	RW	2001—2002	26	5	2	7	10	—	—	—	—	—	
Jean-Pierre Dumont	Canada	RW	2006—2011	388	93	174	267	118	20	6	7	13	6	
Mark Eaton	United States	D	2000—2006	286	15	30	45	130	11	0	0	0	10	
Patrick Eaves	Canada	RW	2013—2014	5	0	0	0	0	—	—	—	—	—	
Mattias Ekholm	Sweden	D	2011—2023	719	62	206	268	347	75	6	29	35	74	
Ryan Ellis	Canada	D	2011—2021	562	75	195	270	189	74	7	31	38	30	
Alexei Emelin	Russia	D	2017—2018	76	1	8	9	40	10	0	0	0	0	
Andreas Englund*	Sweden	D	2024—2026	27	0	2	2	38	—	—	—	—	—	
Martin Erat	Czech Republic	RW	2001—2013	723	163	318	481	426	46	8	15	23	36	
Luke Evangelista*	Canada	RW	2022—2026	253	45	97	142	74	6	1	0	1	2	
Dante Fabbro	Canada	D	2018—2025	315	16	56	72	159	17	0	1	1	6	
Samuel Fagemo	Sweden	LW	2023—2024	4	1	0	1	0	—	—	—	—	—	
David Farrance	United States	D	2020—2021	2	0	0	0	0	—	—	—	—	—	
Mike Farrell	United States	D	2003—2004	1	0	0	0	0	—	—	—	—	—	
Kevin Fiala	Switzerland	LW	2014—2019	204	45	52	97	70	18	5	1	6	8	
Vernon Fiddler	Canada	C	2002—2009; 2016—2017	325	46	48	94	227	22	2	3	5	29	
Mike Fisher	Canada	C	2010—2018	429	111	130	241	261	71	10	14	24	25	Captain 2016-2017
Tom Fitzgerald	United States	C	1998—2002	307	42	46	88	218	—	—	—	—	—	Captain, 1998—2002
Rory Fitzpatrick	United States	D	2000—2001	2	0	0	0	2	—	—	—	—	—	
Callan Foote	Canada	D	2022—2023	24	1	3	4	35	—	—	—	—	—	
Filip Forsberg*	Sweden	C	2012—2026	862	358	398	756	379	81	31	28	59	42	
Peter Forsberg	Sweden	C	2006—2007	17	2	13	15	16	5	2	2	4	12	
Liam Foudy	Canada	C	2023—2024	12	0	3	3	2	—	—	—	—	—	
Cody Franson	Canada	D	2009—2011; 2014—2015	164	15	39	54	48	21	1	8	9	2	
Doug Friedman	United States	LW	1998—1999	2	0	1	1	14	—	—	—	—	—	
Simon Gamache	Canada	LW	2003—2006	18	1	0	1	0	—	—	—	—	—	
Frederick Gaudreau	Canada	C	2016—2019	84	3	5	8	4	8	3	0	3	0	
Paul Gaustad	United States	C	2011—2016	185	16	28	44	147	16	1	1	2	27	
Martin Gelinas	Canada	LW	2007—2008	57	9	11	20	20	—	—	—	—	—	
Blake Geoffrion	Canada	D	2010—2012	42	6	5	11	24	12	0	2	2	4	
Brent Gilchrist	Canada	LW	2002—2003	41	1	2	3	in14	—	—	—	—	—	
Hal Gill	United States	D	2011—2013	55	0	5	5	20	5	0	0	0	0	
Samuel Girard	Canada	D	2017—2018	5	1	2	3	2	—	—	—	—	—	
Cody Glass	Canada	C	2021—2024	121	20	29	49	40	2	0	0	0	0	
Marcel Goc	Germany	C	2009—2011	124	21	33	54	20	6	0	1	1	2	
David Gosselin	Canada	RW	1999—2000; 2001—2002	13	2	1	3	11	—	—	—	—	—	
Petter Granberg	Sweden	D	2015—2017	37	0	2	2	23	—	—	—	—	—	
Mikael Granlund	Finland	C	2018—2023	268	51	111	162	91	20	3	8	11	6	
Derek Grant	Canada	C	2016—2017	6	0	1	1	5	—	—	—	—	—	
Kevin Gravel*	United States	D	2022—2026	30	0	2	2	4	—	—	—	—	—	
Denis Grebeshkov	Russia	D	2009—2010	4	1	1	2	6	2	0	2	2	0	
Rocco Grimaldi	United States	C	2018—2022	166	25	32	57	26	9	3	1	4	2	
Stu Grimson	Canada	LW	2001—2002	30	1	1	2	76	—	—	—	—	—	
Jordan Gross	United States	D	2022—2023	15	3	0	3	2	—	—	—	—	—	
Erik Gudbranson	Canada	D	2020—2021	9	0	1	1	12	2	0	0	0	0	
Ben Guite	Canada	C	2009—2010	6	0	0	0	4	—	—	—	—	—	
Denis Gurianov	Russia	RW	2023—2024	14	1	1	2	0	—	—	—	—	—	
Sean Haggerty	United States	LW	2000—2001	3	0	1	1	4	—	—	—	—	—	
Nicolas Hague*	Canada	D	2025—2026	62	3	12	15	47	—	—	—	—	—	
Matthew Halischuk	Canada	RW	2010—2013	136	24	27	51	39	17	2	1	3	4	
Adam Hall	United States	RW	2001—2006	234	43	42	85	108	11	3	1	4	2	
Dan Hamhuis	Canada	D	2003—2010; 2018—2020	600	32	142	174	438	34	1	8	9	18	
Scott Hannan	Canada	D	2012—2013	29	0	1	1	20	—	—	—	—	—	
Ben Harpur	Canada	D	2020—2022	53	0	8	8	44	5	0	1	1	2	
Ryan Hartman	United States	RW	2017—2019	85	13	13	26	58	9	2	1	3	10	
Scott Hartnell	Canada	LW	2000—2007; 2017—2018	498	106	129	235	626	20	3	3	6	34	
Brett Hauer	United States	D	2001—2002	3	0	0	0	6	—	—	—	—	—	
Erik Haula*	Finland	LW	2020—2021; 2025—2026	132	23	36	59	78	6	1	3	4	4	
Darren Haydar	Canada	RW	2002—2003	2	0	0	0	0	—	—	—	—	—	
Kevin Henderson	Canada	D	2012—2015	4	1	0	1	0	—	—	—	—	—	
Matt Henderson	United States	LW	1998—1999	2	0	0	0	2	—	—	—	—	—	
Matt Hendricks	United States	C	2013—2014	44	2	2	4	54	—	—	—	—	—	
Jukka Hentunen	Finland	RW	2001—2002	10	2	2	4	0	—	—	—	—	—	
Jamie Heward	Canada	D	2001—2002	63	6	12	18	44	—	—	—	—	—	
Jack Hillen	United States	D	2011—2012	55	2	4	6	20	2	0	0	0	2	
Vinnie Hinostroza	United States	C	2024—2025	13	0	2	2	6	—	—	—	—	—	
Jan Hlavac	Czech Republic	LW	2007—2008	18	3	10	13	8	6	0	2	2	2	
Shane Hnidy	Canada	D	2003—2004	9	0	2	2	10	5	0	0	0	6	
Korbinian Holzer	Germany	D	2019—2020	3	0	0	2	0	—	—	—	—	—	
Darcy Hordichuk	Canada	LW	2005—2008	172	9	11	20	313	7	0	0	0	2	
Patric Hornqvist	Sweden	RW	2008—2014	363	106	110	216	173	24	3	5	8	12	
Bill Houlder	Canada	D	1999—2003	302	8	36	44	150	—	—	—	—	—	
Cale Hulse	Canada	D	2000—2003	225	3	15	18	370	—	—	—	—	—	
Brad Hunt	Canada	D	2016—2017	3	0	1	1	0	—	—	—	—	—	
Andrew Hutchinson	United States	D	2003—2004	18	4	4	8	4	—	—	—	—	—	
Matt Irwin	Canada	D	2016—2020	195	6	25	31	83	34	0	2	2	6	
Mark Jankowski	Canada	C	2022—2025	123	18	18	36	41	6	1	1	2	2	
Calle Jarnkrok	Sweden	C	2013—2021	508	94	117	211	113	63	3	12	15	10	
Tanner Jeannot	Canada	F	2020—2023	152	34	28	62	217	9	0	2	2	2	
Ryan Johansen	Canada	C	2015—2023	533	110	252	362	368	61	17	31	48	50	
Andreas Johansson	Sweden	LW	2002—2004	103	32	32	64	48	6	0	0	0	0	
Greg Johnson	Canada	C	1998—2006	502	93	145	238	213	11	1	3	4	2	Captain, 2002—2006
Ryan Jones	Canada	RW	2008—2010	87	14	14	28	40	—	—	—	—	—	
Seth Jones	United States	D	2013—2016	159	14	38	52	44	6	0	4	4	6	
Roman Josi*	Switzerland	D	2011—2026	1030	203	576	779	429	91	12	33	45	48	Captain, 2017–Present
Tyson Jost*	Canada	C	2025—2026	69	8	8	16	30	—	—	—	—	—	
Vladislav Kamenev	Russia	LW	2016—2017	2	0	0	0	2	—	—	—	—	—	
Jere Karalahti	Finland	D	2001—2002	15	0	1	1	12	—	—	—	—	—	
Paul Kariya	Canada	LW	2005—2007	164	55	106	161	76	10	2	7	9	2	
Dan Keczmer	United States	D	1998—2000	40	0	5	5	40	—	—	—	—	—	
Joakim Kemell*	Finland	RW	2024—2026	18	1	2	3	0	—	—	—	—	—	
Patric Kjellberg	Sweden	LW	1998—2002	246	49	77	126	56	—	—	—	—	—	
Linus Klasen	Sweden	LW	2010—2011	4	0	0	0	0	—	—	—	—	—	
Kevin Klein	Canada	D	2005—2014	356	13	55	68	80	28	3	6	9	12	
Tomas Kloucek	Czech Republic	D	2002—2004	8	0	1	1	12	—	—	—	—	—	
Ville Koistinen	Finland	D	2007—2009	86	7	21	28	32	—	—	—	—	—	
Andrei Kostitsyn	Belarus	LW	2011—2012	19	4	8	12	10	8	3	1	4	2	
Sergei Kostitsyn	Belarus	C	2010—2013	198	43	65	108	65	22	1	6	7	6	
Sergei Krivokrasov	Russia	LW	1998—2000	133	34	40	74	82	—	—	—	—	—	
Luke Kunin	United States	C	2020—2022	120	23	18	41	112	10	2	1	3	2	
Zachary L'Heureux*	Canada	LW	2024—2026	87	9	11	20	84	—	—	—	—	—	
Teemu Laakso	Finland	D	2009—2012	17	0	0	0	10	—	—	—	—	—	
Denny Lambert	Canada	LW	1998—1999	76	5	11	16	218	—	—	—	—	—	
Josh Langfeld	United States	RW	2007—2008	2	0	0	0	0	1	0	0	0	0	
Jeremy Lauzon	Canada	D	2021—2025	187	10	18	28	215	9	0	1	1	6	
Pat Leahy	United States	RW	2006—2007	1	0	0	0	0	—	—	—	—	—	
David Legwand	United States	C	1998—2014	956	210	356	566	474	47	13	15	28	46	
Mikko Lehtonen	Finland	D	2006—2007	15	1	2	3	8	—	—	—	—	—	
John Leonard	United States	LW	2022—2023	6	1	0	1	2	—	—	—	—	—	
Tyler Lewington	Canada	D	2020—2021	2	0	1	1	9	—	—	—	—	—	
Mike Liambas	Canada	LW	2016—2017	1	0	0	0	0	—	—	—	—	—	
Richard Lintner	Slovakia	D	1999—2001	83	4	10	14	44	—	—	—	—	—	
Jake Livingstone	United States	D	2022—2023	5	0	1	1	2	—	—	—	—	—	
Matthew Lombardi	Canada	C	2010—2011	2	0	0	0	0	—	—	—	—	—	
Jake Lucchini	Canada	F	2024—2025	3	0	0	0	2	—	—	—	—	—	
Matt Luff	Canada	RW	2021—2022	23	3	3	6	4	—	—	—	—	—	
Sean Malone	United States	C	2020—2021	1	0	1	1	2	—	—	—	—	—	
Cameron Mann	Canada	RW	2002—2003	4	0	0	0	0	—	—	—	—	—	
Jonathan Marchessault*	Canada	C	2024—2026	140	33	54	87	67	—	—	—	—	—	
Danny Markov	Russia	D	2005—2006	58	0	11	11	62	5	0	0	0	6	
Brady Martin*	Canada	C	2025—2026	3	0	1	1	0	—	—	—	—	—	
Michael McCarron*	United States	RW	2020—2026	292	31	35	66	385	8	0	0	0	4	
Ryan McDonagh	United States	D	2022—2024	145	5	47	52	53	6	0	1	1	6	
Brian McGrattan	Canada	D	2011—2013	32	0	2	2	61	—	—	—	—	—	
Jim McKenzie	Canada	LW	2003—2004	61	1	3	4	88	1	0	0	0	0	
Roland McKeown	Canada	D	2022—2023	6	0	0	0	8	—	—	—	—	—	
Cody McLeod	Canada	LW	2016—2018	54	5	2	7	165	15	1	0	1	27	
Craig Millar	Canada	D	1999—2001	62	3	11	14	34	—	—	—	—	—	
Jayson More	Canada	D	1998—1999	18	0	2	2	18	—	—	—	—	—	
Jason Morgan	Canada	C	2003—2004	6	0	2	2	2	—	—	—	—	—	
Marc Moro	Canada	D	1999—2002	27	0	2	2	75	—	—	—	—	—	
Simon Moser	Switzerland	F	2014—2015	6	1	1	2	2	—	—	—	—	—	
Mark Mowers	United States	RW	1998—2000; 2001—2002	85	5	13	18	16	—	—	—	—	—	
Chris Mueller	United States	C	2010—2013	37	2	6	8	8	—	—	—	—	—	
Rem Murray	Canada	LW	2002—2004	92	14	22	36	30	—	—	—	—	—	
Philippe Myers	Canada	D	2021—2022	27	1	3	4	12	—	—	—	—	—	
Brantt Myhres	Canada	RW	2000—2001	20	0	0	0	28	—	—	—	—	—	
Evgeny Namestnikov	Russia	D	1999—2000	2	0	0	0	2	—	—	—	—	—	
James Neal	Canada	LW	2014—2017	219	77	59	136	157	42	14	8	22	30	
Stanislav Neckar	Czech Republic	D	2003—2004	1	0	1	1	0	—	—	—	—	—	
Jeff Nelson	Canada	C	1998—1999	9	2	1	3	2	—	—	—	—	—	
Scott Nichol	Canada	C	2005—2009	209	24	23	47	271	10	0	0	0	19	
Nino Niederreiter	Switzerland	RW	2022—2023	56	18	10	28	16	—	—	—	—	—	
Tommy Novak	United States	C	2021—2025	201	49	68	117	22	6	0	0	0	0	
Gustav Nyquist	Sweden	RW	2023—2025	138	32	64	96	20	6	1	3	4	2	
Eric Nystrom	United States	LW	2013—2016	139	22	11	33	75	—	—	—	—	—	
Shane O'Brien	Canada	D	2010—2011	80	2	7	9	83	12	0	0	0	18	
Cole O'Hara*	Canada	RW	2025—2026	1	0	1	1	0	—	—	—	—	—	
Cal O'Reilly	Canada	C	2008—2012	85	11	24	35	10	—	—	—	—	—	
Ryan O'Reilly*	Canada	C	2023—2026	242	72	124	196	64	6	1	1	2	0	
Jordan Oesterle*	United States	D	2024—2026	16	3	1	4	2	—	—	—	—	—	
Mathieu Olivier	United States	F	2019—2022	48	3	4	7	88	5	0	0	0	14	
Peter Olvecky	Slovakia	LW	2009—2010	1	0	0	0	0	—	—	—	—	—	
Vladimir Orszagh	Slovakia	LW	2001—2004	239	47	58	105	168	6	2	0	2	4	
Jed Ortmeyer	United States	RW	2007—2009	53	4	4	8	32	—	—	—	—	—	
Adam Pardy	Canada	D	2016—2017	4	0	0	0	6	—	—	—	—	—	
P. A. Parenteau	Canada	C	2016—2017	8	0	1	1	0	5	0	0	0	0	
Juuso Parssinen	Finland	C	2022—2025	104	16	26	42	27	1	0	0	0	0	
Denis Pederson	Canada	C	2002—2003	43	4	6	10	39	—	—	—	—	—	
Ville Peltonen	Finland	LW	1998—2001	116	22	35	57	30	—	—	—	—	—	
Nick Perbix*	United States	D	2025—2026	79	3	10	13	20	—	—	—	—	—	
Yanic Perrault	Canada	C	2005—2006	69	22	35	57	30	1	0	0	0	2	
Nathan Perrott	Canada	RW	2001—2003	23	1	2	3	79	—	—	—	—	—	
Oleg Petrov	Russia	RW	2002—2003	17	2	2	4	2	—	—	—	—	—	
Rich Peverley	Canada	C	2006—2009	73	7	13	20	23	6	0	2	2	0	
Antti Pihlstrom	Finland	LW	2007—2009	54	2	5	7	10	—	—	—	—	—	
Joe Piskula	United States	D	2013—2015	3	0	0	0	2	—	—	—	—	—	
Rem Pitlick	United States	C	2018—2021	11	0	2	2	6	—	—	—	—	—	
Domenic Pittis	Canada	C	2002—2003	2	0	0	0	2	—	—	—	—	—	
Libor Pivko	Czech Republic	LW	2002—2003	1	0	0	0	0	—	—	—	—	—	
Alexander Radulov	Russia	RW	2006—2008; 2011—2012	154	47	55	102	74	18	6	8	14	29	
Joonas Rask	Finland	C	2012—2013	2	0	1	1	0	—	—	—	—	—	
Mike Ribeiro	Canada	C	2014—2017	209	26	111	137	128	18	1	6	7	20	
Anthony Richard	Canada	C	2018—2020	2	0	0	0	0	—	—	—	—	—	
Brad Richardson	Canada	C	2020—2021	17	1	3	4	4	2	0	0	0	0	
Zac Rinaldo	Canada	C	2018—2019	23	1	2	3	20	—	—	—	—	—	
Randy Robitaille	Canada	C	1999—2001	131	20	31	51	22	—	—	—	—	—	
Cliff Ronning	Canada	C	1998—2002	301	81	145	226	126	—	—	—	—	—	
Derek Roy	Canada	C	2014—2015	26	1	9	10	2	—	—	—	—	—	
Miikka Salomaki	Finland	LW	2014—2020	167	12	15	27	76	30	1	2	3	10	
Zach Sanford	United States	LW	2022—2023	16	2	1	3	4	—	—	—	—	—	
Steven Santini	United States	D	2019—2020	2	0	0	0	2	—	—	—	—	—	
Mike Santorelli	Canada	C	2008—2010; 2014—2015	54	3	4	7	16	4	1	0	1	0	
Yves Sarault	Canada	LW	2001—2002	1	0	0	0	0	—	—	—	—	—	
Luca Sbisa	Switzerland	D	2020—2021	1	0	0	0	0	—	—	—	—	—	
Dave Scatchard	Canada	C	2009—2010	16	3	2	5	17	—	—	—	—	—	
Reid Schaefer*	Canada	LW	2025—2026	47	6	2	8	17	—	—	—	—	—	
Luke Schenn	Canada	D	2023—2025	124	2	10	12	84	5	0	0	0	0	
Robert Schnabel	Czech Republic	D	2001—2004	22	0	3	3	34	—	—	—	—	—	
Kiefer Sherwood	United States	RW	2022—2024	100	17	23	40	71	6	1	0	1	0	
Kole Sherwood	United States	RW	2021—2022	1	0	0	0	0	—	—	—	—	—	
Timofei Shishkanov	Russia	RW	2003—2004	2	0	0	0	0	—	—	—	—	—	
Mike Sillinger	Canada	C	2005—2006	31	10	12	22	14	5	2	1	3	12	
Jon Sim	Canada	LW	2002—2003	4	1	0	1	0	—	—	—	—	—	
Wayne Simmonds	Canada	RW	2018—2019	17	1	2	3	9	2	0	0	0	0	
Reid Simpson	Canada	LW	2001—2003	52	5	1	6	125	—	—	—	—	—	
Colton Sissons	Canada	C	2013—2014; 2015-2025	690	95	126	221	241	71	10	15	25	46	
Brady Skjei*	United States	D	2024—2026	164	13	46	59	82	—	—	—	—	—	
Karlis Skrastins	Latvia	D	1998—2003	307	13	41	54	130	—	—	—	—	—	
Pavel Skrbek	Czech Republic	D	2000—2002	8	0	0	0	6	—	—	—	—	—	
John Slaney	Canada	D	1998—1999	46	2	12	14	14	—	—	—	—	—	
Cole Smith*	United States	F	2020—2026	271	23	39	62	223	5	0	0	0	0	
Craig Smith	United States	C	2011—2020	661	162	168	330	230	52	7	9	16	12	
Trevor Smith	Canada	C	2016—2017	1	0	0	0	0	—	—	—	—	—	
Wyatt Smith	United States	C	2002—2004	29	4	1	5	2	—	—	—	—	—	
Jerred Smithson	Canada	C	2005—2012	497	36	50	86	313	31	2	1	3	37	
Brad Smyth	Canada	RW	1998—1999	3	0	0	0	6	—	—	—	—	—	
Nick Spaling	Canada	C	2009—2014	297	40	44	84	70	28	2	7	9	0	
Viktor Stalberg	Sweden	RW	2013—2015	95	10	18	28	50	6	1	2	3	0	
Steven Stamkos*	Canada	C	2024—2026	164	69	50	119	106	—	—	—	—	—	
Spencer Stastney*	United States	D	2022—2026	81	3	15	18	20	3	0	0	0	0	
Jeremy Stevenson	United States	LW	2000—2002; 2003—2006	100	10	7	17	225	6	0	0	0	8	
Zack Stortini	Canada	RW	2011—2012	1	0	0	0	7	—	—	—	—	—	
P. K. Subban	Canada	D	2016—2019	211	35	95	130	186	41	7	17	24	39	
Steve Sullivan	Canada	LW	2003—2007; 2008—2011	317	100	163	263	175	26	3	7	10	10	
Alexander Sulzer	Germany	D	2008—2011	53	1	5	6	18	—	—	—	—	—	
Ryan Suter	United States	D	2005—2012	542	38	200	238	396	39	4	9	13	22	
Marek Svatos	Slovakia	RW	2010—2011	9	1	2	3	2	—	—	—	—	—	
Fedor Svechkov*	Russia	C	2024—2026	122	12	22	34	36	—	—	—	—	—	
Petr Sykora	Czech Republic	C	1998—1999	2	0	0	0	0	—	—	—	—	—	
Nick Tarnasky	Canada	C	2008—2009	11	0	1	1	17	—	—	—	—	—	
Petr Tenkrat	Czech Republic	RW	2001—2002	58	8	16	24	28	—	—	—	—	—	
Matt Tennyson	United States	D	2021—2022	8	0	3	3	4	—	—	—	—	—	
Ryan Thang	United States	LW	2011—2012	1	0	0	0	0	—	—	—	—	—	
Andreas Thuresson	Sweden	RW	2009—2011	25	1	2	3	6	—	—	—	—	—	
Kimmo Timonen	Finland	D	1998—2007	573	79	222	301	348	16	1	5	6	18	Captain, 2006—2007
Jarred Tinordi	United States	D	2019—2021	35	1	4	5	38	4	0	0	0	2	
Eeli Tolvanen	Finland	RW	2017—2023	135	25	26	51	24	7	1	0	1	2	
Philip Tomasino	Canada	C	2021—2025	159	23	48	71	41	3	0	0	0	12	
Jordin Tootoo	Canada	RW	2003—2012	486	46	79	125	725	39	3	7	10	63	
Yakov Trenin	Russia	C	2019—2024	283	46	33	79	162	10	5	0	5	4	
Pascal Trepanier	Canada	D	2002—2003	1	0	0	0	0	—	—	—	—	—	
Darren Turcotte	United States	C	1998—2000	49	4	6	10	20	—	—	—	—	—	
Kyle Turris	Canada	C	2017—2020	182	29	67	96	79	23	1	4	5	8	
Ryan Ufko*	United States	D	2024—2026	19	2	9	11	6	—	—	—	—	—	
Scottie Upshall	Canada	RW	2002—2007	77	11	18	29	52	2	0	0	0	0	
Rob Valicevic	United States	RW	1998—2001	159	26	19	45	49	—	—	—	—	—	
Mark Van Guilder	United States	C	2013—2015	1	0	0	0	0	—	—	—	—	—	
Josef Vasicek	Czech Republic	C	2006—2007	38	4	9	13	29	—	—	—	—	—	
Vitaly Vishnevski	Russia	D	2006—2007	15	0	1	1	10	—	—	—	—	—	
Anton Volchenkov	Russia	D	2014—2015	46	0	7	7	14	1	0	0	0	2	
Jan Vopat	Czech Republic	D	1998—2000	61	5	6	11	34	—	—	—	—	—	
Jakub Vrana	Czech Republic	LW	2024—2025	13	2	1	3	4	—	—	—	—	—	
Scott Walker	Canada	RW	1998—2006	410	96	151	247	465	11	0	1	1	12	
Joel Ward	Canada	RW	2008—2011	230	40	58	98	89	18	9	8	17	8	
Todd Warriner	Canada	LW	2002—2003	6	0	1	1	4	—	—	—	—	—	
Austin Watson	United States	LW	2012—2020	306	36	41	77	358	45	10	9	19	48	
Mike Watt	Canada	LW	2000—2001	18	1	1	2	8	—	—	—	—	—	
Shea Weber	Canada	D	2005—2016	685	146	246	392	541	45	10	11	21	39	Captain, 2007—2015
Yannick Weber	Switzerland	D	2016—2020	223	6	18	24	73	30	1	1	2	7	
Ozzy Wiesblatt*	Canada	RW	2024—2026	45	1	5	6	38	—	—	—	—	—	
Clarke Wilm	Canada	C	2002—2003	82	5	11	16	36	—	—	—	—	—	
Adam Wilsby*	Sweden	D	2024—2026	81	2	19	21	35	—	—	—	—	—	
Colin Wilson	Canada	C	2009—2017	502	95	142	237	124	33	8	3	11	2	
Kyle Wilson	Canada	C	2011—2012	5	0	0	0	9	—	—	—	—	—	
Brendan Witt	Canada	D	2005—2006	17	0	3	3	68	5	0	0	0	12	
Matthew Wood*	Canada	RW	2024—2026	77	17	14	31	16	—	—	—	—	—	
Vitali Yachmenev	Russia	RW	1998—2003	338	54	76	130	58	—	—	—	—	—	
Brandon Yip	Canada	RW	2011—2013	59	6	9	15	46	10	1	1	2	6	
Jason York	Canada	D	2002—2004	141	6	28	34	116	6	0	3	3	4	
Greg Zanon	Canada	D	2005—2009	230	7	19	26	100	11	0	4	4	6	
Rob Zettler	Canada	D	2008—2011	2	0	0	0	2	—	—	—	—	—	
Sergei Zholtok	Latvia	C	2003—2004	11	1	1	2	0	6	1	0	1	0	
Marek Zidlicky	Czech Republic	D	2003—2008	307	35	140	175	299	14	0	6	6	14	
Harry Zolnierczyk	Canada	LW	2016—2017	24	2	2	4	10	11	1	2	3	0	
Jason Zucker	United States	LW	2023—2024	18	5	2	7	23	6	1	2	3	2	

== Notes ==
a: As of the 2005–06 season, all games have a winner; teams losing in overtime and shootouts are awarded one point thus the OTL stat replacees the tie statistic. The OTL column also includes SOL (Shootout losses).
