= Kevin Henderson =

Kevin Henderson may refer to:

- Kevin Henderson (footballer) (born 1974), English footballer
- Kevin Henderson (ice hockey) (born 1986), Canadian ice hockey player
- Kevin Henderson (rugby league) (born 1981), British rugby league footballer
- Kevin Henderson (basketball) (born 1964), American basketball player
