= Jean-Pierre Dumont =

Canadian ice hockey player (born 1978)

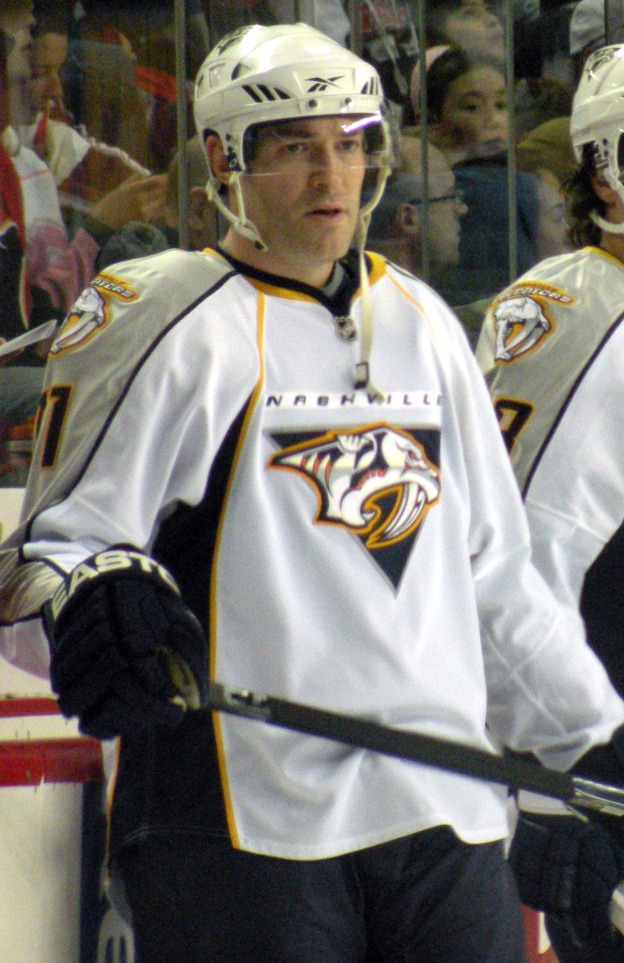
- Dumont with the Nashville Predators in 2009
- Born: April 1, 1978 (age 48) Montreal, Quebec, Canada
- Height: 6 ft 1 in (185 cm)
- Weight: 205 lb (93 kg; 14 st 9 lb)
- Position: Right wing
- Shot: Left
- Played for: Chicago Blackhawks; Buffalo Sabres; SC Bern; Nashville Predators
- National team: Canada
- NHL draft: 3rd overall, 1996; New York Islanders
- Playing career: 1998–2012
Medal record
Representing Canada
World Championships
Gold medal – first place	2004 Czech Reoublic

Jean-Pierre "J.P." Dumont (born April 1, 1978) is a Canadian former professional ice hockey forward who played in the National Hockey League for the Chicago Blackhawks, Buffalo Sabres, and Nashville Predators. Dumont was hired as the head coach of the Tier I Nashville Junior Predators, based in Franklin, Tennessee, in 2016.

== Playing career ==
=== Amateur ===
As a youth, Dumont played in the 1992 Quebec International Pee-Wee Hockey Tournament with the Montreal Canadiens minor ice hockey team.

Dumont played four seasons for Val-d'Or Foreurs in the Quebec Major Junior Hockey League. Roberto Luongo, Francis Lessard, Steve Bégin and Jean-Luc Grand-Pierre were teammates at Val-d'Or who have also made it to the NHL.

=== Professional ===
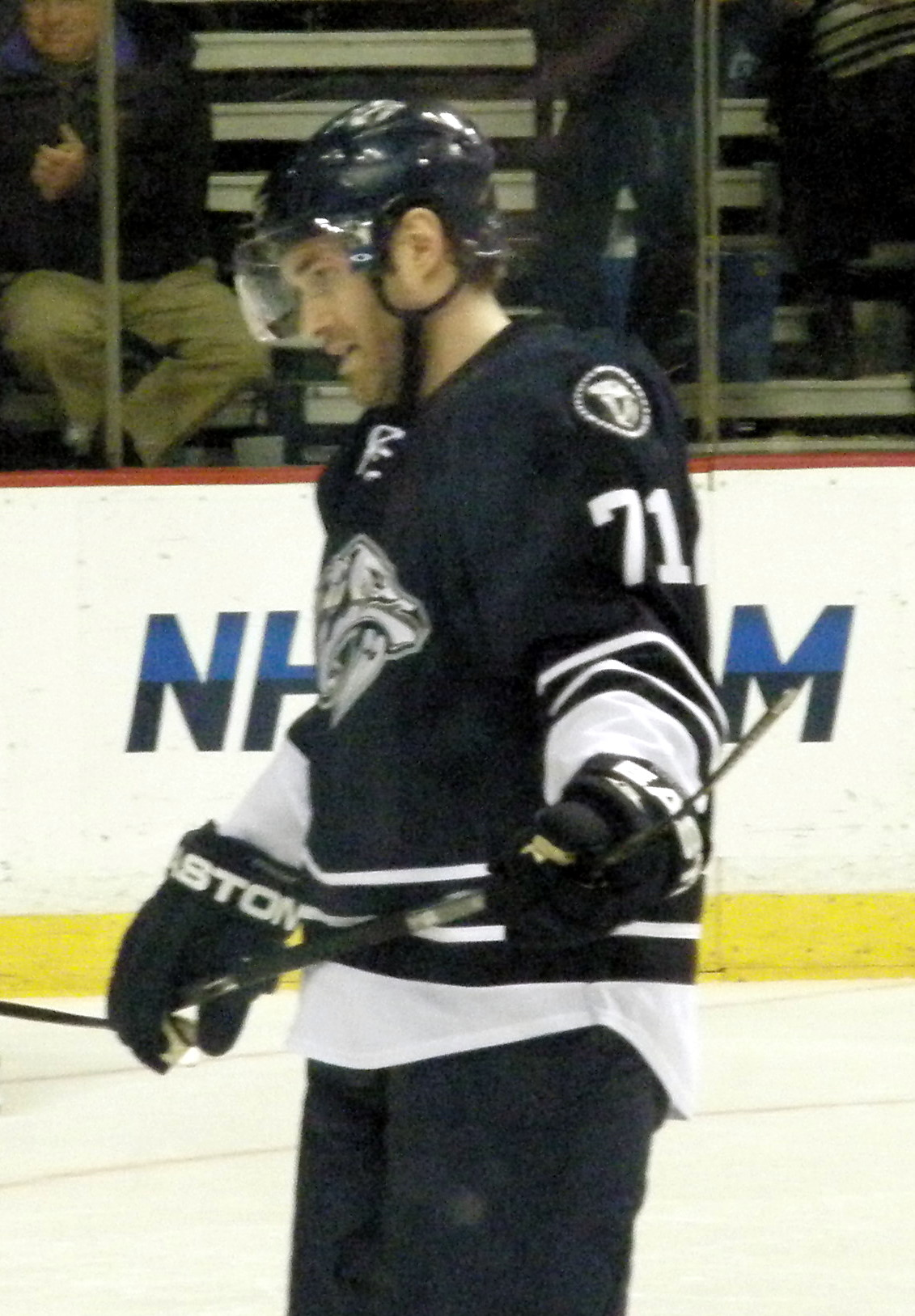
Dumont playing for the Predators in 2010

Dumont was drafted third overall the 1996 NHL entry draft by the New York Islanders. In 1998, a contract dispute between Dumont and the team led to the Islanders to trade him to the Chicago Blackhawks along with a fifth round pick in exchange for Dmitri Nabokov. In March 2000, he was traded by the Blackhawks to the Buffalo Sabres. Dumont, Doug Gilmour and a draft pick went to the Buffalo Sabres in exchange for Michal Grosek.

In August 2006, he signed a two-year, $4.5-million contract with the Nashville Predators after the Buffalo Sabres rejected Dumont's $2.9-million arbitration award.

During the 2007–08 season, Dumont was signed by the Predators to a four-year, $16-million contract extension.

On October 17, 2008, Dumont scored his 400th point in a game against the Columbus Blue Jackets.

In the 2010-11 season, Dumont posted just 19 points in 70 games with the Predators, his lowest point total since coming to Nashville. Consequently, on June 30, 2011, the day before free agency, the Predators bought out Dumont, making him an unrestricted free agent for July 1. In ending his tenure with the Predators, Dumont left the franchise placing fifth in all-time scoring with 267 points in 388 games.

With limited NHL interest, on October 21, 2011, he signed a one-year contract with Swiss team SC Bern of the National League A. Marking a return after playing 13 games for Bern during the 2004–05 NHL lockout. In his final professional season in 2011–12, Dumont contributed to the offence at a point-per-game average, helping Bern reach the Championship finals.

== Personal ==
J.P. is married to Kristin and has four daughters: Ella, Ava, Laila and Mya.

In 2010, Dumont generously donated items to the Brewer, Maine, youth hockey program, by-way of (now former) Maine State Representative Chris Greeley, who served for a number of years in the Maine Legislature with Dumont's father-in-law, a state senator.

== Career statistics ==
=== Regular season and playoffs ===
			Regular season					Playoffs
Season	Team	League	GP	G	A	Pts	PIM	GP	G	A	Pts	PIM
1993–94	Montréal-Bourassa	QMAAA	44	27	20	47	44	4	2	3	5	4
1994–95	Montréal-Bourassa	QMAAA	10	2	7	9	12	—	—	—	—	—
1994–95	Val-d'Or Foreurs	QMJHL	48	5	14	19	24	—	—	—	—	—
1995–96	Val-d'Or Foreurs	QMJHL	66	48	57	105	109	13	12	8	20	22
1996–97	Val-d'Or Foreurs	QMJHL	62	44	64	108	88	13	9	7	16	12
1997–98	Val-d'Or Foreurs	QMJHL	55	57	42	99	63	19	31	15	46	18
1998–99	Chicago Blackhawks	NHL	25	9	6	15	10	—	—	—	—	—
1999–00	Chicago Blackhawks	NHL	47	10	8	18	18	—	—	—	—	—
2000–01	Buffalo Sabres	NHL	79	23	28	51	54	13	4	3	7	8
2001–02	Buffalo Sabres	NHL	76	23	21	44	42	—	—	—	—	—
2002–03	Buffalo Sabres	NHL	76	14	21	35	44	—	—	—	—	—
2003–04	Buffalo Sabres	NHL	77	22	31	53	40	—	—	—	—	—
2004–05	SC Bern	NLA	3	2	2	4	6	10	4	1	5	16
2005–06	Buffalo Sabres	NHL	54	20	20	40	38	18	7	7	14	14
2006–07	Nashville Predators	NHL	82	21	45	66	28	5	4	2	6	0
2007–08	Nashville Predators	NHL	80	29	43	72	34	6	0	2	2	4
2008–09	Nashville Predators	NHL	82	16	49	65	20	—	—	—	—	—
2009–10	Nashville Predators	NHL	74	17	28	45	20	6	2	2	4	0
2010–11	Nashville Predators	NHL	70	10	9	19	16	3	0	1	1	2
2011–12	SC Bern	NLA	31	8	23	31	26	14	6	8	14	4
NHL totals			822	214	309	523	364	51	17	17	34	28

=== International ===
Year	Team	Event	GP	G	A	Pts	PIM
1998	Canada	WJC	7	0	0	0	0
2004	Canada	WC	9	0	1	1	0
Junior totals			7	0	0	0	0
Senior totals			9	0	1	1	0

== See also ==
- List of Nashville Predators players

Awards and achievements
Preceded by Wade Redden	New York Islanders first-round draft pick 1996	Succeeded by Roberto Luongo
Sporting positions
Preceded by James Patrick	Buffalo Sabres captain January 2004	Succeeded by Daniel Briere
