= Martin Erat =

Czech ice hockey player (born 1981)

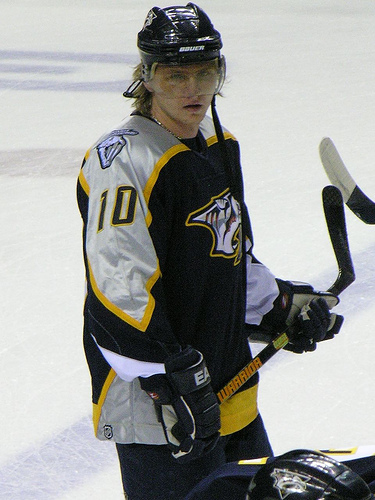
- Erat with the Nashville Predators in 2005
- Born: August 29, 1981 (age 45) Třebíč, Czechoslovakia
- Height: 6 ft 0 in (183 cm)
- Weight: 201 lb (91 kg; 14 st 5 lb)
- Position: Right wing
- Shot: Left
- Played for: Nashville Predators; Washington Capitals; Arizona Coyotes; HC Zlín; Avangard Omsk; HC Kometa Brno
- National team: Czech Republic
- NHL draft: 191st overall, 1999; Nashville Predators
- Playing career: 1999–2020

Martin Erat (Czech pronunciation: [ˈmarcɪn ˈɛrat]) (born August 29, 1981) is a Czech former professional ice hockey player. He played in the National Hockey League (NHL) for the Nashville Predators, Washington Capitals and the Phoenix/Arizona Coyotes.

== Playing career ==
Erat was selected in the seventh round, 191st overall, of the 1999 NHL entry draft by the Nashville Predators, the team's 12th choice in the draft

Erat made a splash in his NHL rookie year in 2001–02 as a member of the "vowel line", which consisted of himself on left wing, Vladimír Országh on right wing and Denis Arkhipov at centre. His first NHL point was a game-winning goal against the Calgary Flames on October 11, 2001. That year, he set a then Nashville rookie record for games played (80), assists (24) and points (33).

Erat struggled in his sophomore season in 2002–03 and spent the majority of the season with the Predators' American Hockey League (AHL) affiliate, the Milwaukee Admirals. After changing his number from 19 to 10 in the off-season, his play improved in his third season, 2003–04. He notched then career highs with goals (16), assists (33) and points (49), also ranking second on the team with a +10 plus-minus rating. Erat's first Stanley Cup playoff point was an assist in the 2004 Western Conference Quarterfinals in a 2–1 loss to the Detroit Red Wings on April 10, 2004.

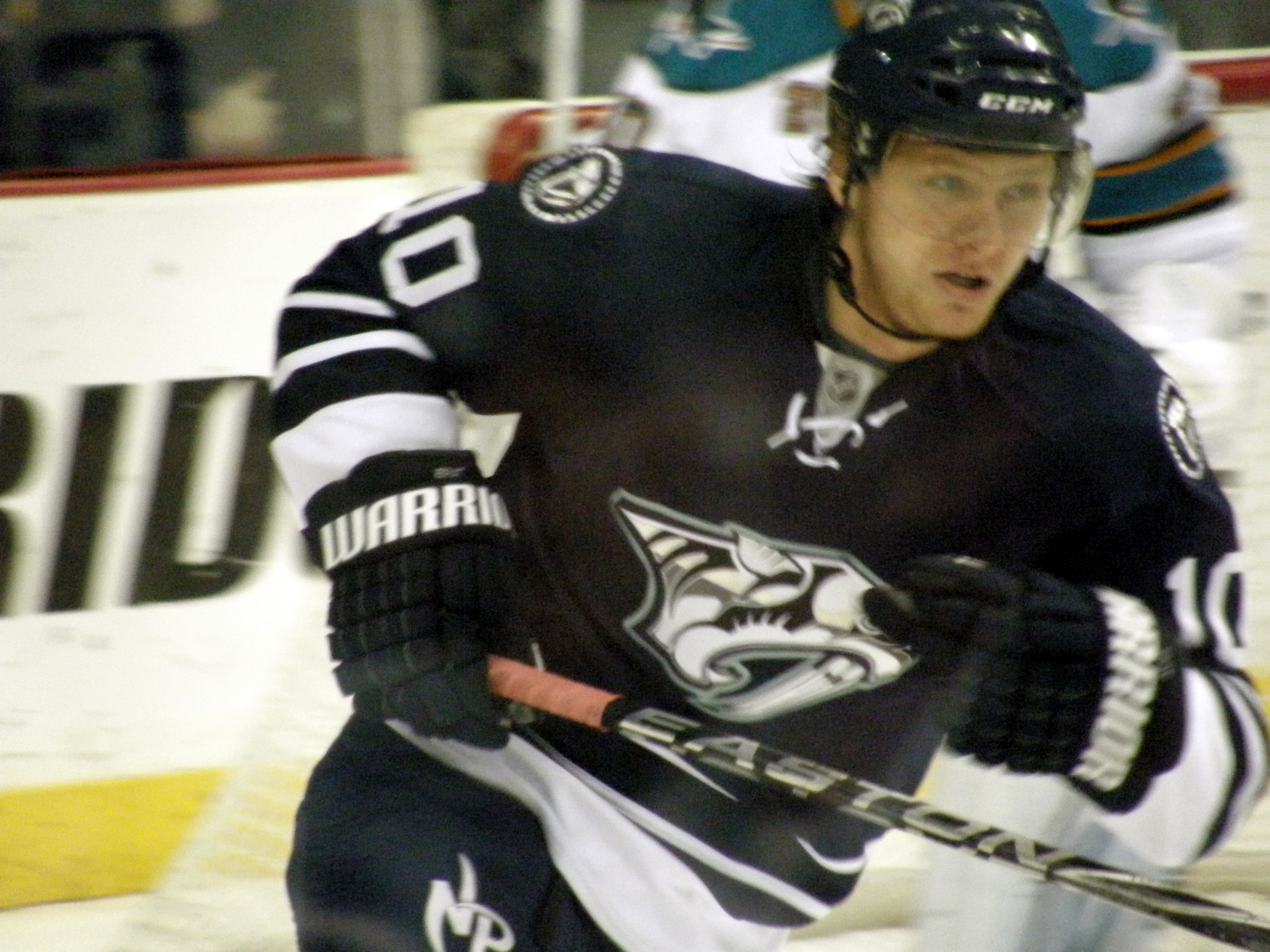
Erat playing for the Predators in 2010

During the 2004–05 NHL lockout, Erat played for HC Zlín of the Czech Extraliga, where he finished eighth in the league in scoring with 20 goals and 23 assists in 48 games.

In 2005–06, Erat scored a career-high 20 goals in his fourth season with the Predators, tallying 49 points. He also played for the Czech national team at the 2006 Winter Olympics in Turin, where he helped the team secure a bronze medal.

During the 2006–07 season, Erat emerged as a legitimate first-line player, tallying 57 points in 68 games. Most often, Erat teamed with Paul Kariya and David Legwand to form the team's top unit. However, Erat missed the final five weeks of the season with a torn medial collateral ligament (MCL).

In 2007–08, Erat posted a new career-high of 23 goals and added 34 assists to once again reach the 57-point plateau. Following the 2007–08 season, he signed a seven-year, $31.5 million contract extension with the Predators. He has two career hat-tricks, the first against the Edmonton Oilers and the second against the Vancouver Canucks on December 8, 2009.

On April 3, 2013, the Predators traded Erat and Michael Latta to the Washington Capitals at the NHL trade deadline in exchange for prospect Filip Forsberg. Erat requested the trade away from Nashville and waived a no-trade clause in his contract to facilitate the deal.

On November 25, 2013, Erat requested a trade for the second time since being traded to the Capitals, just eight months prior. Erat first asked for a trade in October after being demoted to the team's fourth line. Erat's second request for a trade came after he was a healthy scratch for the first time in his career. Erat has said he would waive his no-trade clause, claiming it is "time to move on".

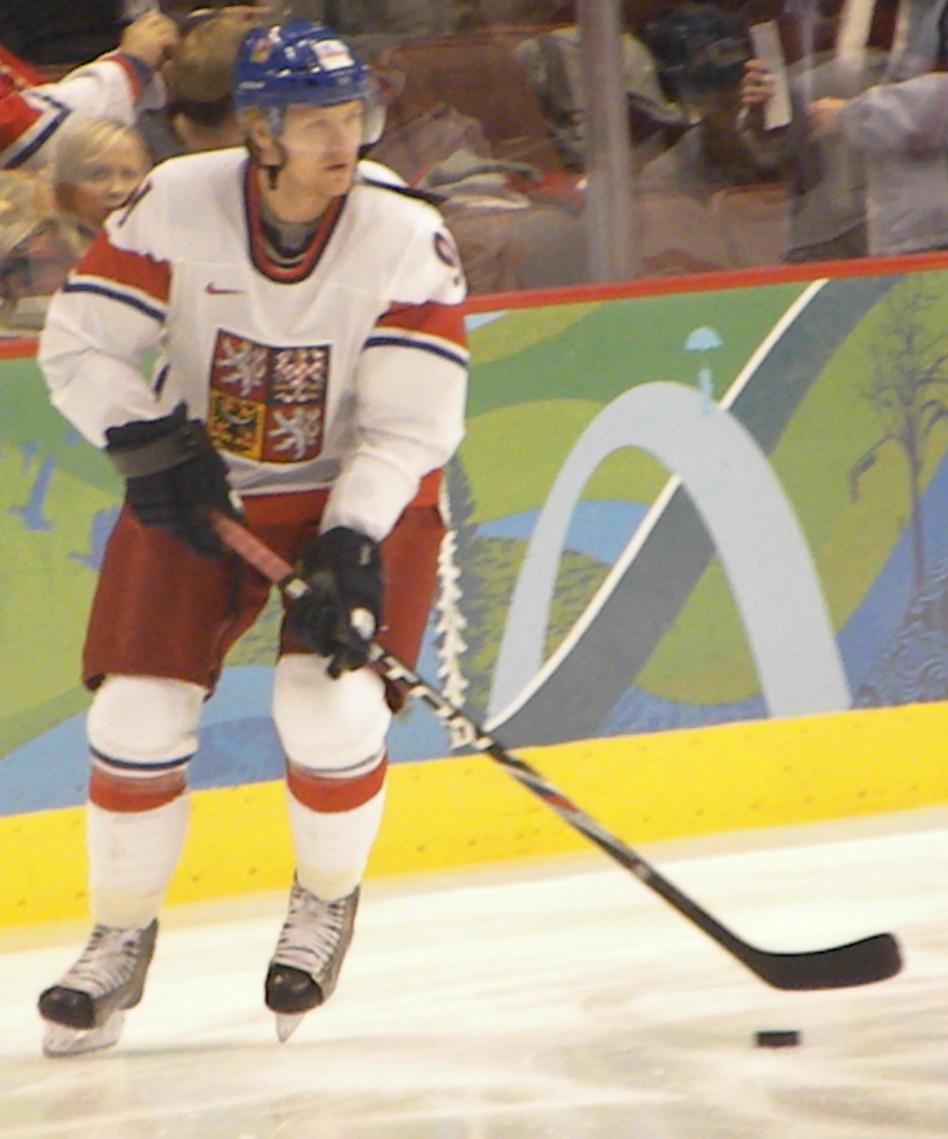

Medal record

Representing Czech Republic

Olympic Games
Bronze medal – third place	2006 Turin	

World Championships
Silver medal – second place	2006 Riga	
Bronze medal – third place	2012 Helsinki	

World Junior Championships
Gold medal – first place	2001 Moscow	

On the eve of the 2013–14 NHL trade deadline, on March 4, Erat was traded (alongside John Mitchell) to the Phoenix Coyotes in exchange for Chris Brown, Rostislav Klesla and a fourth-round pick in 2015.

After 13 seasons and 881 regular season games in the NHL, Erat left North America as a free agent and signed a one-year contract with Russian club Avangard Omsk of the Kontinental Hockey League (KHL) on September 17, 2015. In May 2016, he returned to the Czech Extraliga and signed a contract with HC Kometa Brno. On April 19, 2017, Erat helped the team claim its 12th championship, after a 51-year drought. Erat retired on May 30, 2019.

== International play ==
Erat played for the Czech Republic national team at the 2001 World Junior Ice Hockey Championships, helping the team win the gold medal. In 2006, he played for the bronze medal-winning Czech team at the 2006 Winter Olympics in Turin. That same year, Erat was also a member of the silver medal-winning team from the 2006 IIHF World Championship in Riga.

Erat was called up to replace Vladimír Sobotka on the Czech team for the 2014 Winter Olympics in Sochi. Erat reprised his role on the Czech team in the 2018 Winter Olympics in Pyeongchang.

== Personal ==
Martin has an older brother, Roman, who played for HC Kometa Brno in the Czech Extraliga.

== Career statistics ==
=== Regular season and playoffs ===
			Regular season					Playoffs
Season	Team	League	GP	G	A	Pts	PIM	GP	G	A	Pts	PIM
1997–98	HC ZPS–Barum Zlín	CZE U20	33	26	26	52	11	—	—	—	—	—
1998–99	HC ZPS–Barum Zlín	CZE U20	35	21	23	44	11	—	—	—	—	—
1998–99	HC ZPS–Barum Zlín	ELH	5	0	0	0	2	—	—	—	—	—
1999–2000	Saskatoon Blades	WHL	66	27	26	53	82	11	4	8	12	16
2000–01	Saskatoon Blades	WHL	31	19	35	54	48	—	—	—	—	—
2000–01	Red Deer Rebels	WHL	17	4	24	28	24	22	15	21	36	32
2001–02	Nashville Predators	NHL	80	9	24	33	32	—	—	—	—	—
2002–03	Milwaukee Admirals	AHL	45	10	22	32	41	6	5	4	9	4
2002–03	Nashville Predators	NHL	27	1	7	8	14	—	—	—	—	—
2003–04	Nashville Predators	NHL	76	16	33	49	38	6	0	1	1	6
2004–05	HC Hamé Zlín	ELH	48	20	23	43	129	16	7	5	12	12
2005–06	Nashville Predators	NHL	80	20	29	49	76	5	1	1	2	6
2006–07	Nashville Predators	NHL	68	16	41	57	50	3	0	1	1	0
2007–08	Nashville Predators	NHL	76	23	34	57	40	6	1	3	4	8
2008–09	Nashville Predators	NHL	71	17	33	50	48	—	—	—	—	—
2009–10	Nashville Predators	NHL	74	21	28	49	50	6	4	1	5	4
2010–11	Nashville Predators	NHL	64	17	33	50	22	10	1	5	6	6
2011–12	Nashville Predators	NHL	71	19	39	58	30	10	1	3	4	6
2012–13	Nashville Predators	NHL	36	4	17	21	26	—	—	—	—	—
2012–13	Washington Capitals	NHL	9	1	2	3	4	4	0	0	0	4
2013–14	Washington Capitals	NHL	53	1	23	24	22	—	—	—	—	—
2013–14	Phoenix Coyotes	NHL	17	2	3	5	6	—	—	—	—	—
2014–15	Arizona Coyotes	NHL	79	9	23	32	48	—	—	—	—	—
2015–16	Avangard Omsk	KHL	40	5	19	24	16	10	1	7	8	14
2016–17	HC Kometa Brno	ELH	39	13	23	36	34	13	4	4	8	12
2017–18	HC Kometa Brno	ELH	49	12	34	46	20	14	5	6	11	10
2018–19	HC Kometa Brno	ELH	18	3	14	17	29	9	0	6	6	4
2019–20	HC Kometa Brno	ELH	16	1	5	6	12	—	—	—	—	—
NHL totals			881	176	369	545	506	50	8	15	23	40
KHL totals			40	5	19	24	16	10	1	7	8	14
ELH totals			175	49	99	148	226	52	16	21	37	38

=== International ===
Year	Team	Event	GP	G	A	Pts	PIM
1999	Czech Republic	WJC18	6	0	2	2	12
2001	Czech Republic	WJC	7	2	1	3	16
2006	Czech Republic	OLY	8	1	1	2	4
2006	Czech Republic	WC	9	3	5	8	6
2008	Czech Republic	WC	7	2	4	6	14
2010	Czech Republic	OLY	5	0	1	1	2
2012	Czech Republic	WC	5	3	4	2
2014	Czech Republic	OLY	5	1	0	1	0
2015	Czech Republic	WC	10	1	3	4	6
2018	Czech Republic	OLY	6	0	1	1	4
Junior totals			13	2	3	5	28
Senior totals			55	11	16	27	38

== Awards ==
- Named the WHL Eastern Conference Player of the Month for November, 2000.
- Named the WHL Player of the Week for November 13–19, 2000.
- Named the NHL Third Star of the Week for November 12–18, 2007.
- Named the NHL Second Star of the Week for March 12–18, 2012.
