= Calle Järnkrok =

Swedish ice hockey player (born 1991)

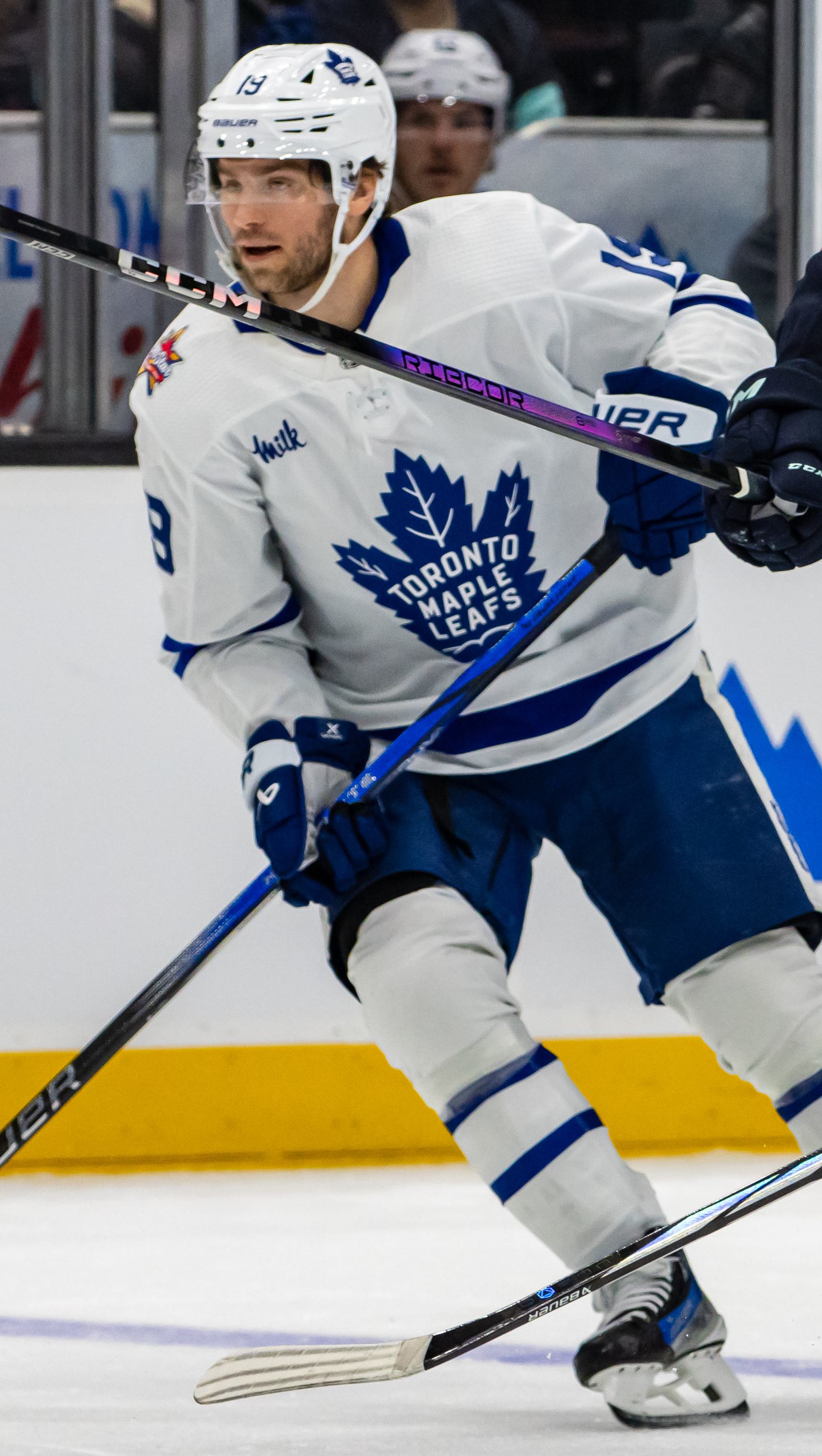
- Järnkrok with the Toronto Maple Leafs in 2024
- Born: 25 September 1991 (age 34) Gävle, Sweden
- Height: 5 ft 11 in (180 cm)
- Weight: 186 lb (84 kg; 13 st 4 lb)
- Position: Centre
- Shoots: Right
- SHL team Former teams: Brynäs IF; Nashville Predators; Seattle Kraken; Calgary Flames; Toronto Maple Leafs
- National team: Sweden
- NHL draft: 51st overall, 2010; Detroit Red Wings
- Playing career: 2009–present

Calle Järnkrok (born 25 September 1991), nicknamed "Ironhook", is a Swedish professional ice hockey player who is a centre playing for Brynäs IF in the Swedish Hockey League. Järnkrok was drafted 51st overall by the Detroit Red Wings in the 2010 NHL entry draft. He has also previously played for the Nashville Predators, Seattle Kraken, Calgary Flames, and Toronto Maple Leafs of the NHL.

== Playing career ==
After a strong second half to the 2009–10 season where he earned a regular roster spot on Brynäs IF, Järnkrok went from 21st among European skaters in the midterm rankings to 4th among European skaters in the National Hockey League (NHL)'s Central Scouting final rankings for the 2010 NHL entry draft. He was drafted in the second round, 51st overall, of the 2010 NHL entry draft by the Detroit Red Wings.

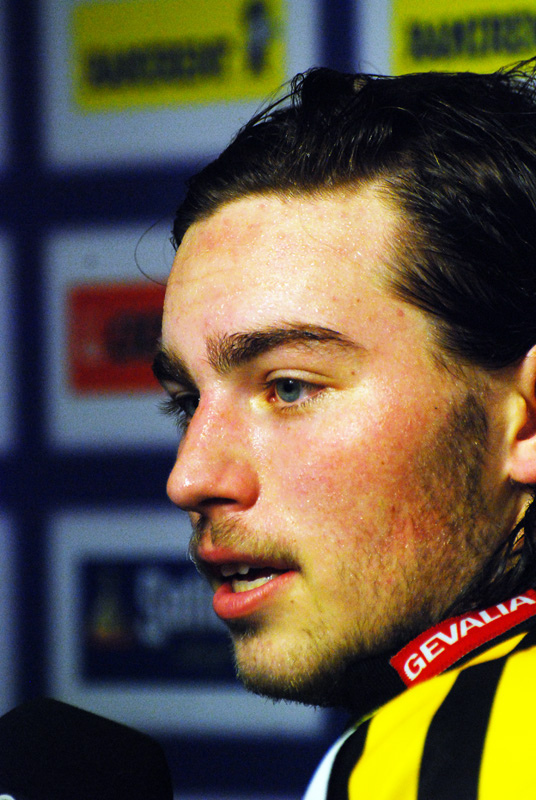
Calle Järnkrok in 2012

Twenty-eight games into the 2010–11 season, Järnkrok led all junior players in points with eight goals and nine assists and was selected to be the second of four Elitserien Rookie of the Year candidates of the season.

On 5 March 2014, Järnkrok was traded to the Nashville Predators (along with Patrick Eaves) as part of a deal that brought David Legwand to Detroit. He was assigned to the Predators' then-American Hockey League (AHL) affiliate, the Milwaukee Admirals. Järnkrok recorded an assist in his NHL debut on 21 March. He scored his first NHL goal on 27 March against Matt Hackett of the Buffalo Sabres.

During the 2014–15 season, his first full NHL season, Järnkrok recorded 7 goals and 11 assists in 74 games. He posted two goals and seven assists in his first 12 NHL games, including five points in the first five contests of his NHL career, the second-longest point streak by a Predators player in the first games of their NHL career, behind Marek Židlický's six games from 9–23 October 2003. On 17 July 2015, the Predators re-signed Järnkrok to a one-year contract. On 26 July 2016, Järnkrok was again re-signed by the Nashville Predators to a six-year, $12 million contract.

Having played his eighth season with the Predators following the pandemic-delayed 2020–21 season, Järnkrok was left exposed by Nashville and selected at the 2021 NHL expansion draft by the Seattle Kraken on 21 July 2021. On 16 March 2022, five days before the trade deadline, Järnkrok was traded by the Kraken to the Calgary Flames for the Florida Panthers' 2022 second-round draft pick, the Calgary Flames' 2023 third-round draft pick and 2024 seventh-round draft picks. Järnkrok played in 12 playoff games with the Flames, scoring one goal and three assists. At the end of the season, he became an unrestricted free agent.

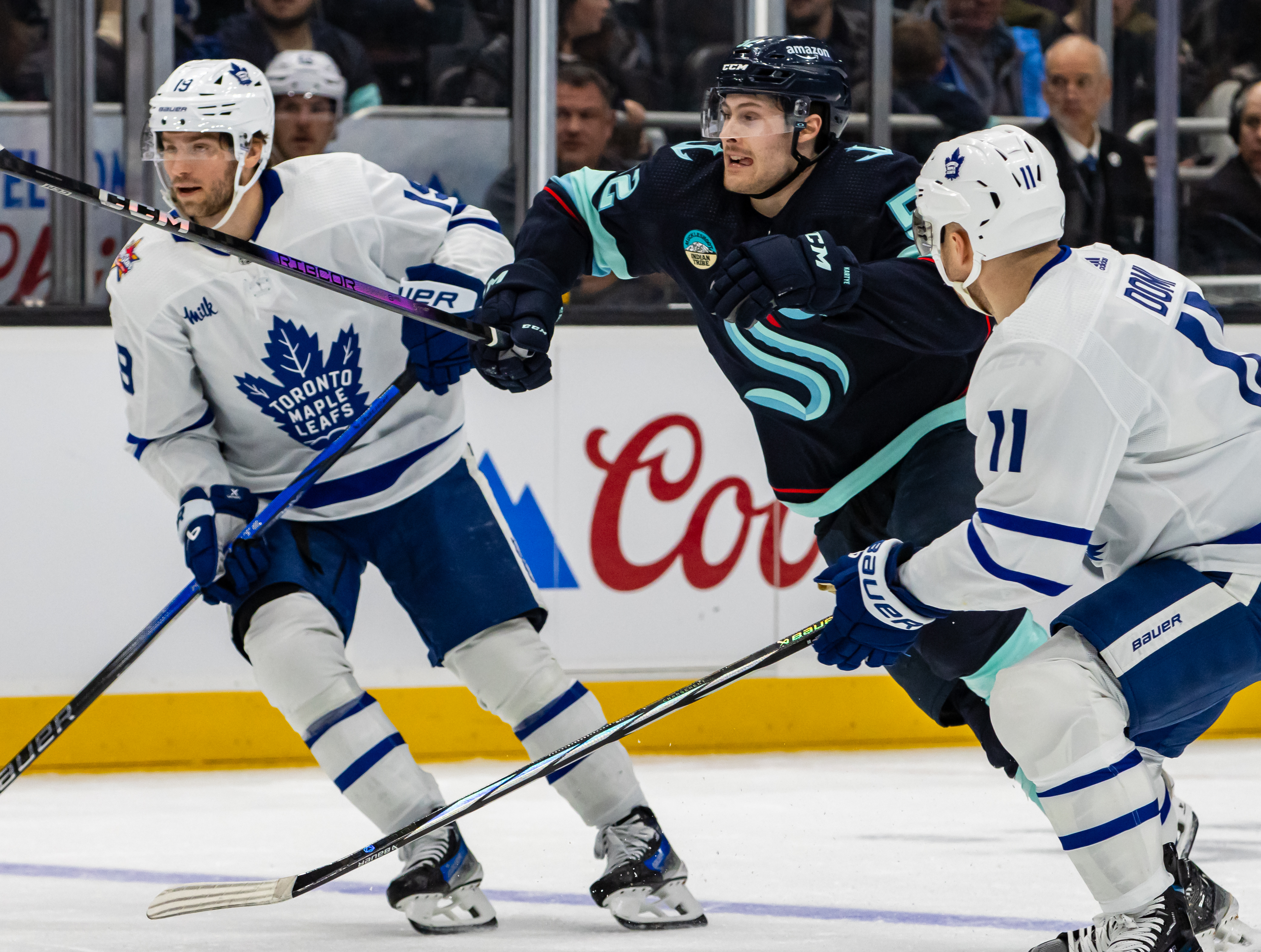
Järnkrok (left), Tye Kartye (centre) and Max Domi (right) in 2024.

As a free agent, Järnkrok joined the Toronto Maple Leafs after signing a four-year, $8.4 million contract on 15 July 2022.

== Personal life ==
Järnkrok's cousin, and former Flames teammate Elias Lindholm, was drafted fifth overall by the Carolina Hurricanes in the 2013 NHL entry draft and plays for the Boston Bruins.

== Career statistics ==
=== Regular season and playoffs ===
| | | | Regular season | | | | | Playoffs |
| Season | Team | League | GP | G | A | Pts | PIM | GP | G | A | Pts | PIM |
|---|---|---|---|---|---|---|---|---|---|---|---|---|
| 2007–08 | Brynäs IF | J18 Allsv | 13 | 4 | 4 | 8 | 4 | — | — | — | — | — |
| 2007–08 | Brynäs IF | J20 | 2 | 0 | 0 | 0 | 2 | — | — | — | — | — |
| 2008–09 | Brynäs IF | J18 | 3 | 2 | 4 | 6 | 12 | — | — | — | — | — |
| 2008–09 | Brynäs IF | J18 Allsv | 4 | 3 | 3 | 6 | 0 | 2 | 0 | 1 | 1 | 2 |
| 2008–09 | Brynäs IF | J20 | 41 | 8 | 18 | 26 | 37 | 7 | 4 | 3 | 7 | 2 |
| 2009–10 | Brynäs IF | J20 | 19 | 11 | 20 | 31 | 30 | 2 | 0 | 1 | 1 | 0 |
| 2009–10 | Brynäs IF | SEL | 33 | 4 | 6 | 10 | 2 | 5 | 1 | 1 | 2 | 0 |
| 2010–11 | Brynäs IF | SEL | 49 | 11 | 16 | 27 | 4 | 3 | 3 | 0 | 3 | 2 |
| 2011–12 | Brynäs IF | SEL | 50 | 16 | 23 | 39 | 22 | 16 | 4 | 12 | 16 | 12 |
| 2012–13 | Brynäs IF | SEL | 53 | 13 | 29 | 42 | 12 | 4 | 0 | 0 | 0 | 6 |
| 2012–13 | Grand Rapids Griffins | AHL | 9 | 0 | 3 | 3 | 0 | — | — | — | — | — |
| 2013–14 | Grand Rapids Griffins | AHL | 57 | 13 | 23 | 36 | 14 | — | — | — | — | — |
| 2013–14 | Milwaukee Admirals | AHL | 6 | 5 | 4 | 9 | 0 | 3 | 1 | 1 | 2 | 2 |
| 2013–14 | Nashville Predators | NHL | 12 | 2 | 7 | 9 | 4 | — | — | — | — | — |
| 2014–15 | Nashville Predators | NHL | 74 | 7 | 11 | 18 | 18 | 6 | 0 | 2 | 2 | 0 |
| 2015–16 | Nashville Predators | NHL | 81 | 16 | 14 | 30 | 14 | 14 | 0 | 1 | 1 | 4 |
| 2016–17 | Nashville Predators | NHL | 81 | 15 | 16 | 31 | 25 | 21 | 2 | 5 | 7 | 2 |
| 2017–18 | Nashville Predators | NHL | 68 | 16 | 19 | 35 | 12 | 7 | 0 | 1 | 1 | 0 |
| 2018–19 | Nashville Predators | NHL | 79 | 10 | 16 | 26 | 12 | 6 | 0 | 2 | 2 | 2 |
| 2019–20 | Nashville Predators | NHL | 64 | 15 | 19 | 34 | 14 | 4 | 1 | 0 | 1 | 0 |
| 2020–21 | Nashville Predators | NHL | 49 | 13 | 15 | 28 | 14 | 5 | 0 | 1 | 1 | 2 |
| 2021–22 | Seattle Kraken | NHL | 49 | 12 | 14 | 26 | 2 | — | — | — | — | — |
| 2021–22 | Calgary Flames | NHL | 17 | 0 | 4 | 4 | 4 | 12 | 1 | 3 | 4 | 0 |
| 2022–23 | Toronto Maple Leafs | NHL | 73 | 20 | 19 | 39 | 14 | 11 | 1 | 2 | 3 | 0 |
| 2023–24 | Toronto Maple Leafs | NHL | 52 | 10 | 11 | 21 | 18 | 7 | 0 | 0 | 0 | 0 |
| 2024–25 | Toronto Maple Leafs | NHL | 19 | 1 | 6 | 7 | 4 | 12 | 0 | 1 | 1 | 2 |
| 2025–26 | Toronto Maple Leafs | NHL | 56 | 6 | 2 | 8 | 8 | — | — | — | — | — |
| SHL totals | | | 185 | 44 | 74 | 118 | 40 | 28 | 8 | 13 | 21 | 20 |
| NHL totals | | | 774 | 143 | 173 | 316 | 163 | 105 | 5 | 18 | 23 | 12 |

=== International ===
Medal record

Men's Ice hockey

Representing Sweden

World Championships
| Gold medal – first place | 2013 Sweden/Finland | |
| Bronze medal – third place | 2014 Minsk | |

| Year | Team | Event | Result | GP | G | A | Pts | PIM |
|---|---|---|---|---|---|---|---|---|
| 2009 | Sweden | U18 | 5th | 6 | 2 | 7 | 9 | 4 |
| 2011 | Sweden | WJC | 4th | 6 | 2 | 3 | 5 | 2 |
| 2012 | Sweden | WC | 6th | 8 | 0 | 1 | 1 | 0 |
| 2013 | Sweden | WC | 1st place, gold medalist(s) | 10 | 0 | 1 | 1 | 4 |
| 2014 | Sweden | WC | 3rd place, bronze medalist(s) | 10 | 0 | 0 | 0 | 4 |
| Junior totals | | | | 12 | 4 | 10 | 14 | 6 |
| Senior totals | | | | 28 | 0 | 2 | 2 | 8 |
