= Kevin Henderson (ice hockey) =

Canadian ice hockey player

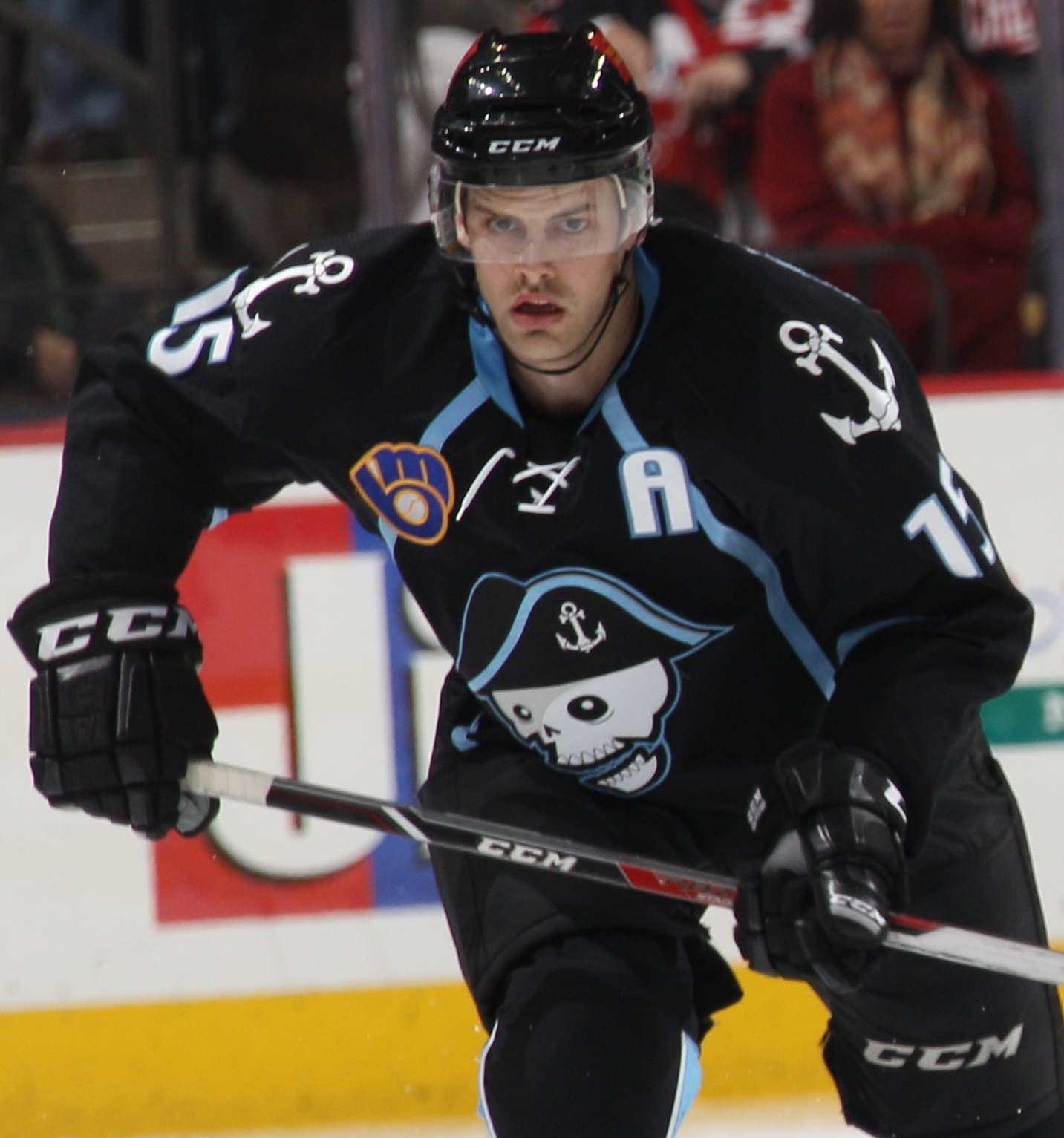
- Henderson with the Milwaukee Admirals in 2013
- Born: 3 December 1986 (age 39) Toronto, Ontario, Canada
- Height: 6 ft 3 in (191 cm)
- Weight: 210 lb (95 kg; 15 st 0 lb)
- Position: Left wing
- Shot: Left
- Played for: Nottingham Panthers; SønderjyskE Ishockey; HK Poprad; SaiPa; Nashville Predators
- NHL draft: Undrafted
- Playing career: 2009–2019

Kevin Henderson (born December 3, 1986) is a Canadian former ice hockey player. He played 4 games in the National Hockey League with the Nashville Predators during the 2012–13 season. The rest of his career, which lasted from 2009 to 2019, was mainly spent in the minor leagues and later in Europe.

== Playing career ==
On April 22, 2009, Henderson was signed as a Undrafted Free Agent out of the Canadian university system by the San Jose Sharks.

After two seasons with the Sharks American Hockey League affiliate, the Worcester Sharks, Henderson was not tendered a new contract. Midway through the 2011–12 season, Henderson was eventually signed by the Cincinnati Cyclones of the ECHL on February 2, 2012. He went scoreless in 2 games before he was loaned on a try-out to the AHL with the Milwaukee Admirals on February 10, 2012.

On July 1, 2012, Henderson was signed to a one-year contract with the Admirals NHL affiliate, the Nashville Predators. With the lockout in effect, Henderson was assigned directly to the Admirals to start the year. In the final stages of the shortened 2012–13 regular season, Henderson received his first NHL recall by the Predators on April 19, 2013. On the same day, Henderson scored his first NHL goal in his debut game for the Predators in a 5-4 overtime defeat against the Chicago Blackhawks.

As an un-signed free agent a month into the 2015–16 season, Henderson agreed to a contract with the Quad City Mallards of the ECHL on November 12, 2015. He played part of the season there before going to Europe, where he spent parts of four seasons before retiring in 2019.

== Career statistics ==
=== Regular season and playoffs ===
			Regular season					Playoffs
Season	Team	League	GP	G	A	Pts	PIM	GP	G	A	Pts	PIM
2002–03	Thornhill Rattlers	OPJHL	5	2	1	3	4	—	—	—	—	—
2003–04	Thornhill Rattlers	OPJHL	47	11	23	34	44	—	—	—	—	—
2004–05	Kitchener Rangers	OHL	47	5	8	13	46	15	0	3	3	8
2004–05	Thornhill Thunderbirds	OPJHL	11	5	9	14	33	—	—	—	—	—
2005–06	Kitchener Rangers	OHL	63	6	11	17	66	2	1	0	1	0
2006–07	Kitchener Rangers	OHL	56	33	15	48	69	9	4	6	10	13
2007–08	University of New Brunswick	CIS	27	5	10	15	22	—	—	—	—	—
2008–09	University of New Brunswick	CIS	28	19	31	50	28	—	—	—	—	—
2009–10	Worcester Sharks	AHL	64	2	13	15	45	11	0	1	1	4
2010–11	Worcester Sharks	AHL	73	8	13	21	45	—	—	—	—	—
2011–12	Cincinnati Cyclones	ECHL	2	0	0	0	4	—	—	—	—	—
2011–12	Milwaukee Admirals	AHL	30	4	7	11	12	3	0	0	0	2
2012–13	Milwaukee Admirals	AHL	67	17	12	29	24	3	1	0	1	2
2012–13	Nashville Predators	NHL	4	1	0	1	0	—	—	—	—	—
2013–14	Milwaukee Admirals	AHL	50	7	7	14	14	—	—	—	—	—
2013–14	Texas Stars	AHL	15	5	4	9	8	21	1	5	6	16
2014–15	Texas Stars	AHL	56	7	5	12	27	2	0	0	0	0
2015–16	Quad City Mallards	ECHL	19	5	6	11	12	—	—	—	—	—
2015–16	SaiPa	FIN	6	2	1	3	2	4	0	0	0	4
2016–17	Norfolk Admirals	ECHL	4	0	0	0	0	—	—	—	—	—
2016–17	HK Poprad	SVK	30	5	11	16	14	1	0	0	0	0
2017–18	SønderjyskE Ishockey	DEN	16	4	7	11	12	—	—	—	—	—
2018–19	Nottingham Panthers	EIHL	41	5	14	19	10	3	0	1	1	2
AHL totals			355	50	61	111	175	40	2	6	8	24
NHL totals			4	1	0	1	0	—	—	—	—	—
