= David Legwand =

American ice hockey player (born 1980)

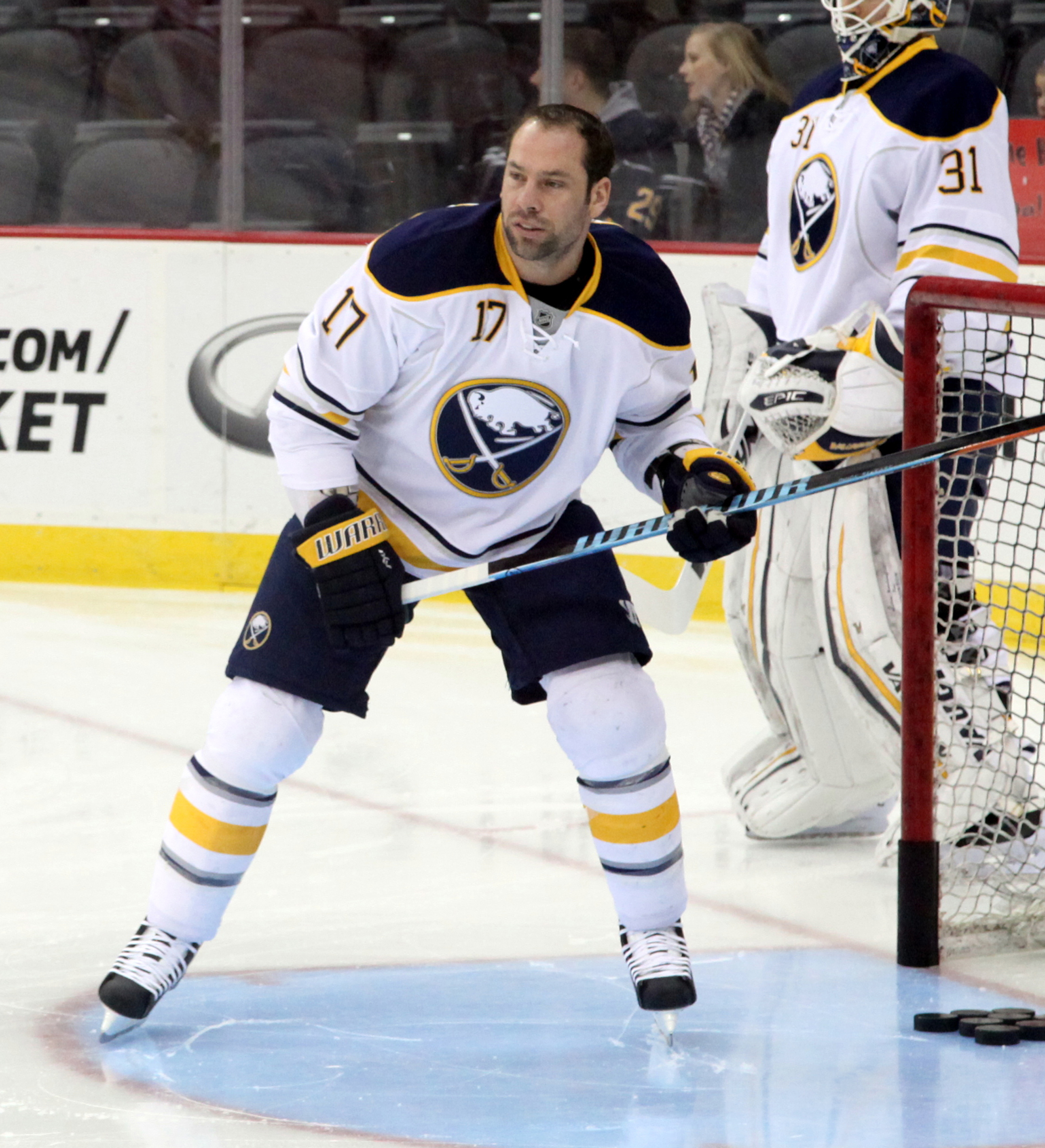
- Legwand with the Buffalo Sabres in 2016
- Born: August 17, 1980 (age 45) Detroit, Michigan, U.S.
- Height: 6 ft 2 in (188 cm)
- Weight: 207 lb (94 kg; 14 st 11 lb)
- Position: Center
- Shot: Left
- Played for: Nashville Predators; EHC Basel; Detroit Red Wings; Ottawa Senators; Buffalo Sabres
- National team: United States
- NHL draft: 2nd overall, 1998; Nashville Predators
- Playing career: 1999–2016

David A. Legwand (born August 17, 1980) is an American former professional ice hockey forward who played 16 seasons in the National Hockey League (NHL). He was the first player ever drafted by the Nashville Predators, with whom he spent 12 full seasons and set several franchise records. He finished the final three seasons of his career split between the Predators, Detroit Red Wings, Ottawa Senators and Buffalo Sabres.

== Playing career ==
=== Amateur ===
Legwand attended Grosse Pointe North High School. As a youth, he played in the 1993 and 1994 Quebec International Pee-Wee Hockey Tournaments with the Detroit Little Caesars minor ice hockey team.

He played his junior career with the Plymouth Whalers of the OHL. In the season before he was drafted, he scored 54 goals along with 51 assists, totaling 105 points. He also won the Red Tilson Award as the most outstanding player in the league.

=== Nashville Predators ===
Prior to the 1998 NHL entry draft, Nashville Predators general manager David Poile dealt their first- and second-round picks to the San Jose Sharks for the second and 85th pick. As a result, he was able to draft Legwand second overall behind Vincent Lecavalier. Poile had previously been in discussions with the Anaheim Ducks, Calgary Flames, and the New York Rangers before San Jose accepted their deal at the last minute. After suffering from mononucleosis during training camp, Legwand returned to the Plymouth Whalers for the 1998–99 OHL season. He missed further time during the season after the death of a family member and the World Juniors. He finished third on the team with 31 goals and 49 assists for 80 points through 55 games. Once the Whalers were eliminated from the OHL playoffs, he signed a three-year contract with the Predators worth $8.925 million and made his NHL debut against the New Jersey Devils.

Prior to the start of the 1999–00 season, Legwand was encouraged to put on more weight after he experienced a small growth spurt. As such, he worked with the team's strength and conditioning coach and added between 5 and 10 pounds. Despite improving physically, he failed to impress head coach Barry Trotz with his skills at the start of training camp. He still made the Predators opening night roster and tallied his first career NHL goal in a 4–2 win over the Toronto Maple Leafs. Through the month of December, Legwand accumulated three goals and five assists for eight points through 10 games. By the end of March, he had tallied 28 points and led all rookies with 13 goals through 67 games.

Legwand returned to the Predators for his sophomore season but failed to make an immediate impact on the team. After causing several turnovers leading to goals during a late October game against the Vancouver Canucks, Legwand sat as a healthy scratch for the first time in his NHL career. On December 23, 2000, during a game against the New York Rangers, Legwand became the first NHL player to score on a penalty shot in overtime. As the Predators failed to qualify for the 2001 Stanley Cup playoffs, Legwand competed for Team USA at the 2001 IIHF World Championship.

During the NHL 2004–05 lockout season, Legwand played for the Swiss team EHC Basel.

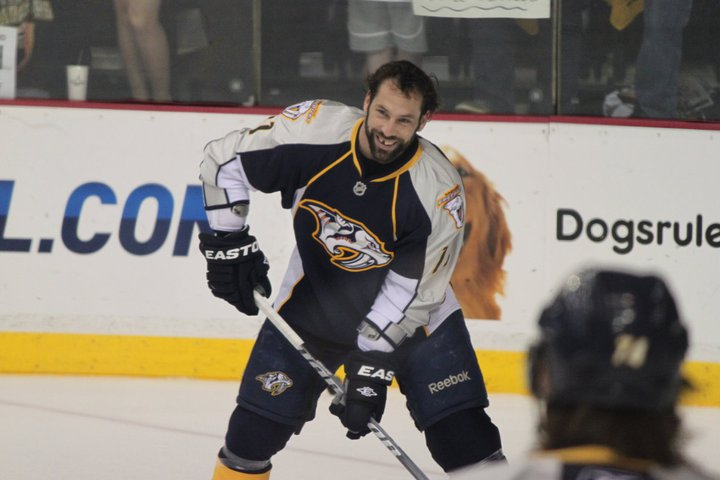
Legwand with the Nashville Predators in May 2011.

After several first round playoff exits, Legwand and the Predators advanced to the second round for the first time in franchise history and his career in 2011. The Predators were defeated by the Presidents' Trophy-winning and Stanley Cup runner-up Vancouver Canucks in six games.

In early November 2005, Legwand suffered a knee injury. Prior to rejoining the Predators once his knee recovered, Legwand played two games in the American Hockey League (AHL) with the Milwaukee Admirals. He made his AHL debut on February 23, 2006, while playing on a line with Scottie Upshall and Jordin Tootoo.

On March 5, 2014, in the final year of his contract with the Predators and out of playoff contention, Legwand was traded to the Detroit Red Wings for Patrick Eaves, Calle Järnkrok, and a conditional 2014 draft pick, ending his 15-year career in Nashville. He left Nashville as the franchise's all-time leader in all offensive categories and games played, with 956 appearances.

=== Later years ===
On July 4, 2014, Legwand signed a two-year, $6 million free agent contract with the Ottawa Senators. The move came after the Senators traded star center Jason Spezza to the Dallas Stars. In his only season in Ottawa in 2014-15 season, Legwand added a veteran presence in helping return the Senators to the playoffs, however suffered a decline in production with 9 goals and 27 points in 80 games.

On June 26, 2015, Legwand was traded to the Buffalo Sabres along with Senators teammate Robin Lehner in exchange for the New York Islanders' 1st-round pick in the 2015 NHL entry draft.

Legwand announced his retirement from professional hockey on December 22, 2016. Legwand was inducted into the National Polish-American Sports Hall of Fame in 2026 (Troy, Michigan).

== Personal life ==
Legwand and his wife, Lindsey, have two children, with the firstborn being a son born on November 21, 2009.

In January 2015, Legwand, along with former NHL player Derian Hatcher, entered an agreement to purchase the Sarnia Sting of the Ontario Hockey League (OHL). The transfer of ownership was approved by the OHL Board of Governors and completed on March 4, 2015.

== Career statistics ==
=== Regular season and playoffs ===
			Regular season					Playoffs
Season	Team	League	GP	G	A	Pts	PIM	GP	G	A	Pts	PIM
1996–97	Detroit Ambassadors	NAHL	44	21	41	62	58	—	—	—	—	—
1997–98	Plymouth Whalers	OHL	59	54	51	105	56	15	8	12	20	24
1998–99	Plymouth Whalers	OHL	55	31	49	80	65	11	3	8	11	8
1998–99	Nashville Predators	NHL	1	0	0	0	0	—	—	—	—	—
1999–00	Nashville Predators	NHL	71	13	15	28	30	—	—	—	—	—
2000–01	Nashville Predators	NHL	81	13	28	41	38	—	—	—	—	—
2001–02	Nashville Predators	NHL	63	11	19	30	54	—	—	—	—	—
2002–03	Nashville Predators	NHL	64	17	31	48	34	—	—	—	—	—
2003–04	Nashville Predators	NHL	82	18	29	47	46	6	1	0	1	8
2004–05	EHC Basel	NLB	3	6	2	8	2	19	16	23	39	20
2005–06	Nashville Predators	NHL	44	7	19	26	34	5	0	1	1	8
2005–06	Milwaukee Admirals	AHL	3	0	0	0	0	—	—	—	—	—
2006–07	Nashville Predators	NHL	78	27	36	63	44	5	0	3	3	2
2007–08	Nashville Predators	NHL	65	15	29	44	38	3	1	0	1	2
2008–09	Nashville Predators	NHL	73	20	22	42	32	—	—	—	—	—
2009–10	Nashville Predators	NHL	82	11	27	38	24	6	2	5	7	8
2010–11	Nashville Predators	NHL	64	17	24	41	24	12	6	3	9	8
2011–12	Nashville Predators	NHL	78	19	34	53	26	10	3	3	6	10
2012–13	Nashville Predators	NHL	48	12	13	25	20	—	—	—	—	—
2013–14	Nashville Predators	NHL	62	10	30	40	30	—	—	—	—	—
2013–14	Detroit Red Wings	NHL	21	4	7	11	31	5	0	0	0	0
2014–15	Ottawa Senators	NHL	80	9	18	27	32	3	0	0	0	0
2015–16	Buffalo Sabres	NHL	79	5	9	14	14	—	—	—	—	—
NHL totals			1,136	228	390	618	551	55	13	15	28	46

=== International ===
Year	Team	Event	Result	GP	G	A	Pts	PIM
1998	United States	WJC	5th	7	0	0	0	2
1999	United States	WJC	8th	6	1	3	4	31
1999	United States	WC	6th	6	0	2	2	4
2000	United States	WC	5th	6	1	1	2	4
2001	United States	WC	4th	9	2	4	6	4
2005	United States	WC	6th	7	0	1	1	4
Junior totals				13	1	3	4	33
Senior totals				28	3	8	11	16

Awards and achievements
Preceded by Franchise created	Nashville Predators first-round draft pick 1998	Succeeded by Brian Finley
