= 2006 Stanley Cup Final =

2006 ice hockey championship series

	1	2	3	4	5	6	7	Total
Carolina Hurricanes	5	5	1	2	3*	0	3	4
Edmonton Oilers	4	0	2	1	4*	4	1	3
- * – Denotes overtime period(s)
- Location(s): Raleigh: RBC Center (1, 2, 5, 7); Edmonton: Rexall Place (3, 4, 6)
- Coaches: Carolina: Peter Laviolette; Edmonton: Craig MacTavish
- Captains: Carolina: Rod Brind'Amour; Edmonton: Jason Smith
- National anthems: Carolina: Holly Wilver; Edmonton: Paul Lorieau
- Referees: Paul Devorski (1, 3, 5); Mick McGeough (1, 3, 5); Bill McCreary (2, 4, 6, 7); Brad Watson (2, 4, 6, 7)
- Dates: June 5–19, 2006
- MVP: Cam Ward (Hurricanes)
- Series-winning goal: Frantisek Kaberle (15:42, second)
- Hall of Famers: Hurricanes: Mark Recchi (2017); Oilers: Chris Pronger (2015); Officials: Bill McCreary (2014)
- Networks: Canada: (English): CBC (French): RDS; United States: (English): OLN (1–2), NBC (3–7)
- Announcers: (CBC) Bob Cole and Harry Neale (RDS) Pierre Houde and Yvon Pedneault (OLN/NBC) Mike Emrick and John Davidson (NHL International) Dave Strader and Joe Micheletti

The 2006 Stanley Cup Final was the championship series of the National Hockey League's (NHL) 2005–06 season, and the culmination of the 2006 Stanley Cup playoffs. The first Stanley Cup Final since 2004 after a lockout canceled the entirety of the 2004–05 season, it was contested between the Eastern Conference champion Carolina Hurricanes and the Western Conference champion Edmonton Oilers. Carolina defeated Edmonton in seven games to win the franchise's first Stanley Cup and become the tenth post-1967 expansion team and third former WHA team to win the Cup. Carolina's 2006 win was also the team's second league championship (the club, then known as the New England Whalers won the WHA Championship in 1973). This was the first professional sports championship won by a team from North Carolina.

It was Carolina's second appearance in the Finals, the other being in 2002, a loss to the Detroit Red Wings. It was Edmonton's seventh appearance in the Finals and their first since winning their fifth Stanley Cup in 1990. It was also the first (and to date only) Finals matchup between teams that entered the league in 1979.

This was Carolina’s last Stanley Cup championship until 2026.

== Paths to the Finals ==
=== Carolina Hurricanes ===
The Hurricanes won the Southeast Division and clinched the second seed in the Eastern Conference. In the first round, they defeated the seventh-seeded Montreal Canadiens in six games. In the second round, they defeated the third-seeded New Jersey Devils in five games. In the Eastern Conference Final, the Hurricanes defeated the fourth-seeded Buffalo Sabres in seven games to make their second Stanley Cup Final in five years.

=== Edmonton Oilers ===
The Oilers entered the playoffs as the 8th seed in the Western Conference. In the first round, they shockingly upset the Presidents' Trophy winner Detroit Red Wings in six games. They then beat the fifth-seeded San Jose Sharks in six games in the second round after trailing two games to none. In the Western Conference Final, the Oilers beat the sixth-seeded Mighty Ducks of Anaheim in five games to return to the Stanley Cup Final for the first time since 1990.

The Oilers became the first team since the NBA's 1999 New York Knicks and the first team in the history of the NHL to make it to the Stanley Cup Final as a #8 seed. This feat would also be accomplished by the Los Angeles Kings in 2012, the Nashville Predators in 2017, and the Florida Panthers in 2023.

== Game summaries ==
This series marked the first time that two former World Hockey Association teams played against each other for the Stanley Cup since they merged with the NHL in 1979. As a result of the new scheduling formula that was implemented before the 2005–06 NHL season, the Hurricanes and the Oilers did not meet during the regular season.

These were also the first ever finals contested by two teams that had both missed the playoffs the previous season (skipping 2005 due to the lockout). It was also to be the first finals contested by teams that would both go on to miss the following year's playoffs. Prior to these Finals, only the 1938–39 Chicago Blackhawks had ever missed the playoffs one year, then played in the Stanley Cup Final (win or lose) the following season, and then missed the playoffs again the season after that. Both the Hurricanes and Oilers have now accomplished this dubious feat.

Hurricanes head coach Peter Laviolette joined Ron Wilson as the only people to have head coached in an Olympics and Stanley Cup finals in the same year, having coached the American ice hockey team during the Torino Olympics. Both would coach in either one in 2010; Wilson coached the American ice hockey team to silver medal at the Vancouver Olympics, while Laviolette would coach in the Stanley Cup Final with the Philadelphia Flyers.

=== Game one ===
June 5	Edmonton Oilers	4–5	Carolina Hurricanes	RBC Center	Recap

In Game 1, Carolina tied the biggest comeback in Stanley Cup finals history, overcoming a three-goal deficit to win 5–4. Edmonton scored first, 8:18 into the first period, with a goal from Fernando Pisani. In the second period, Chris Pronger scored the first penalty shot goal in finals history after defenceman Niclas Wallin illegally covered the puck inside his own goal crease, and Ethan Moreau's goal at 16:23 gave the Oilers a 3–0 lead. But at the 17:17 mark, Rod Brind'Amour scored the Hurricanes' first goal of the game. Carolina then tied the game in the third period with two scores by Ray Whitney. The Hurricanes jumped ahead 4–3 on a shorthanded breakaway goal by Justin Williams, but Edmonton's Ales Hemsky scored on a power play to tie the game with 6:29 remaining. Late in the final period, Oilers goaltender Dwayne Roloson suffered a series-ending knee injury in a collision and was replaced with Ty Conklin. With 32 seconds remaining in regulation, Conklin misplayed the puck behind his own net, where it deflected off Jason Smith's stick to the front of the empty net, allowing Brind'Amour to score the winning goal. Hurricanes goaltender Cam Ward had to make the last of his 34 saves with 3.8 seconds remaining, robbing Shawn Horcoff for the second time in the third period with a glove save to preserve the victory.

Scoring summary
Period	Team	Goal	Assist(s)	Time	Score
1st	EDM	Fernando Pisani (10)	Raffi Torres (5) and Jaroslav Spacek (7)	08:18	1–0 EDM
2nd	EDM	Chris Pronger (5) – ps	Unassisted	10:36	2–0 EDM
2nd	EDM	Ethan Moreau (2)	Matt Greene (1)	16:23	3–0 EDM
2nd	CAR	Rod Brind'Amour (10)	Justin Williams (10) and Cory Stillman (13)	17:17	3–1 EDM
3rd	CAR	Ray Whitney (7)	Doug Weight (12) and Andrew Ladd (3)	01:40	3–2 EDM
3rd	CAR	Ray Whitney (8) – pp	Mark Recchi (6) and Eric Staal (14)	05:09	3–3
3rd	CAR	Justin Williams (6) – sh	Chad LaRose (1) and Aaron Ward (3)	10:02	4–3 CAR
3rd	EDM	Ales Hemsky (6) – pp	Jarret Stoll (5) and Chris Pronger (14)	13:31	4–4
3rd	CAR	Rod Brind'Amour (11)	Unassisted	19:28	5–4 CAR
Penalty summary
Period	Team	Player	Penalty	Time	PIM
1st	CAR	Mike Commodore	Roughing	02:12	2:00
1st	EDM	Steve Staios	Tripping	11:45	2:00
1st	EDM	Marc-Andre Bergeron	Interference	14:12	2:00
1st	CAR	Bret Hedican	Tripping	14:46	2:00
1st	CAR	Niclas Wallin	Tripping	14:55	2:00
1st	CAR	Rod Brind'Amour	Hooking	16:33	2:00
2nd	EDM	Michael Peca	Elbowing	05:59	2:00
2nd	CAR	Niclas Wallin	Covering puck in crease	10:36	Penalty shot
2nd	EDM	Radek Dvorak	Hooking	18:33	2:00
3rd	CAR	Frantisek Kaberle	Hooking	02:11	2:00
3rd	EDM	Ethan Moreau	Cross-checking	04:28	2:00
3rd	CAR	Bret Hedican	Hooking	08:11	2:00
3rd	CAR	Eric Staal	High-sticking	12:53	2:00

Shots by period
Team	1	2	3	Total
Edmonton	8	12	18	38
Carolina	8	7	11	26

=== Game two ===
June 7	Edmonton Oilers	0–5	Carolina Hurricanes	RBC Center	Recap

With Roloson's injury, Jussi Markkanen started for the Oilers in game two. Although Markkanen had played 37 games in the regular season, sharing the job with Ty Conklin and Mike Morrison, he and Conklin switched back and forth during the playoff as the backup (with the other sitting in the press box as a healthy scratch); he also had not played in a game since March 1, 2006. Late in the third period, Edmonton forward Georges Laraque checked Carolina forward Andrew Ladd into the boards, resulting in a major penalty and Laraque being ejected from the game. The Hurricanes went on to shut out the Oilers, 5–0, with five different Carolina players scoring goals, and Cam Ward making 25 saves to record his second shutout of the postseason. It was the first time three goaltenders had been used in the Stanley Cup Final since 1970, when the St. Louis Blues employed Jacques Plante, Glenn Hall and Ernie Wakely on their way to being swept by the Boston Bruins.

Scoring summary
Period	Team	Goal	Assist(s)	Time	Score
1st	CAR	Andrew Ladd (2)	Eric Staal (15) and Frantisek Kaberle (7)	06:21	1–0 CAR
2nd	CAR	Frantisek Kaberle (3) – pp	Ray Whitney (5) and Matt Cullen (10)	10:28	2–0 CAR
2nd	CAR	Cory Stillman (8)	Niclas Wallin (5) and Justin Williams (11)	19:57	3–0 CAR
3rd	CAR	Doug Weight (3) – pp	Mark Recchi (7) and Matt Cullen (11)	02:21	4–0 CAR
3rd	CAR	Mark Recchi (6) – pp	Frantisek Kaberle (8) and Matt Cullen (12)	04:12	5–0 CAR
Penalty summary
Period	Team	Player	Penalty	Time	PIM
1st	CAR	Craig Adams	Interference	03:26	2:00
1st	EDM	Chris Pronger	Hooking	11:13	2:00
1st	CAR	Cory Stillman	Goaltender interference	12:47	2:00
1st	CAR	Ray Whitney	Hooking	18:46	2:00
2nd	EDM	Matt Greene	Cross-checking	05:34	2:00
2nd	EDM	Jason Smith	Roughing	06:20	2:00
2nd	EDM	Raffi Torres	Interference	08:52	2:00
2nd	CAR	Aaron Ward	Holding	11:23	2:00
2nd	EDM	Shawn Horcoff	Interference	14:20	2:00
3rd	EDM	Sergei Samsonov	Goaltender interference	01:31	2:00
3rd	EDM	Ethan Moreau	Roughing	02:47	2:00
3rd	EDM	Ryan Smyth	High-sticking	05:01	2:00
3rd	CAR	Aaron Ward	Cross-checking	08:52	2:00
3rd	EDM	Georges Laraque	Tripping	11:14	2:00
3rd	CAR	Glen Wesley	Holding	14:12	2:00
3rd	EDM	Georges Laraque	Boarding – major	16:44	5:00
3rd	EDM	Georges Laraque	Game misconduct	16:44	10:00
3rd	CAR	Glen Wesley	Holding	19:19	2:00

Shots by period
Team	1	2	3	Total
Edmonton	6	10	9	25
Carolina	8	10	8	26

=== Game three ===
June 10	Carolina Hurricanes	1–2	Edmonton Oilers	Rexall Place	Recap

Markkanen once again started in net with Roloson still out. Georges Laraque returned to the Edmonton lineup after being ejected the previous game. Shawn Horcoff scored just over two minutes into the first period. During the second period, a short-handed goal was waved off by the referee, because he had lost sight of the puck and had blown the whistle, despite the fact that the puck had not yet been covered. The Hurricanes responded midway through the third period with their captain, Rod Brind'Amour, taking a rebound off a blocked shot past Markkanen. However, with 2:15 left in the game, Edmonton's Ryan Smyth scored the winning goal after crashing into Ward inside the crease as they both tried to get control of a rebound off of a shot by Ales Hemsky.

Scoring summary
Period	Team	Goal	Assist(s)	Time	Score
1st	EDM	Shawn Horcoff (6)	Jaroslav Spacek (8) and Ales Hemsky (8)	02:31	1–0 EDM
2nd	None				
3rd	CAR	Rod Brind'Amour (12)	Cory Stillman (14)	09:09	1–1
3rd	EDM	Ryan Smyth (6)	Ales Hemsky (9) and Jaroslav Spacek (9)	17:45	2–1 EDM
Penalty summary
Period	Team	Player	Penalty	Time	PIM
1st	CAR	Doug Weight	Interference	06:03	2:00
1st	EDM	Chris Pronger	Tripping	10:02	2:00
1st	CAR	Craig Adams	Tripping	12:30	2:00
1st	CAR	Kevyn Adams	Hooking	13:03	2:00
1st	CAR	Mark Recchi	Hooking	15:53	2:00
1st	EDM	Radek Dvorak	High-sticking	17:57	2:00
2nd	CAR	Matt Cullen	Holding	01:37	2:00
2nd	EDM	Shawn Horcoff	Playing with a broken stick	06:04	2:00
2nd	CAR	Rod Brind'Amour	Holding	06:48	2:00
2nd	EDM	Matt Greene	Interference	10:25	2:00
2nd	EDM	Dick Tarnstrom	Hooking	16:04	2:00
3rd	CAR	Bret Hedican	Interference	02:42	2:00

Shots by period
Team	1	2	3	Total
Carolina	6	8	11	25
Edmonton	9	11	10	30

=== Game four ===
June 12	Carolina Hurricanes	2–1	Edmonton Oilers	Rexall Place

Edmonton got off to a good start when Sergei Samsonov opened the scoring at 8:40 of the first period. However, the lead was short-lived as Cory Stillman replied just 29 seconds later to tie the game at 1–1. Stillman also made a sound defensive play on Chris Pronger late in the second period, tipping the puck away in the Edmonton zone to the front of the net, where Eric Staal fed a pass to Mark Recchi, who scored the eventual game-winning goal with 4:08 to go in the period. Once again Edmonton's power play was ineffective, failing to capitalize on five chances, including a two-man advantage in the first period. When the game ended, the Oilers were 1-for-25 on the power play to this point in the series.

Scoring summary
Period	Team	Goal	Assist(s)	Time	Score
1st	EDM	Sergei Samsonov (4)	Radek Dvorak (1) and Jarret Stoll (6)	08:40	1–0 EDM
1st	CAR	Cory Stillman (9)	Frantisek Kaberle (1) and Eric Staal (16)	09:09	1–1 EDM
2nd	CAR	Mark Recchi (7)	Eric Staal (17) and Cory Stillman (15)	15:56	2–1 CAR
3rd	None				
Penalty summary
Period	Team	Player	Penalty	Time	PIM
1st	EDM	Raffi Torres	Tripping	08:57	2:00
1st	CAR	Andrew Ladd	Tripping	10:04	2:00
1st	CAR	Ray Whitney	Hooking	13:08	2:00
1st	CAR	Ray Whitney	Hooking	15:35	2:00
1st	CAR	Aaron Ward	High-sticking	16:23	2:00
1st	EDM	Jarret Stoll	Interference	19:20	2:00
2nd	EDM	Chris Pronger	Holding	03:24	2:00
2nd	CAR	Bret Hedican	High-sticking	08:54	2:00
2nd	EDM	Matt Greene	Holding	18:05	2:00
2nd	CAR	Justin Williams	Holding	18:35	2:00
2nd	EDM	Chris Pronger	Cross-checking	19:27	2:00
3rd	EDM	Jason Smith	Hooking	15:22	2:00

Shots by period
Team	1	2	3	Total
Carolina	4	11	5	20
Edmonton	8	8	5	21

=== Game five ===
June 14	Edmonton Oilers	4–3	OT	Carolina Hurricanes	RBC Center	Recap

Carolina had a 3–1 lead in the series and a chance to win the Stanley Cup on their home ice. However, Edmonton scored first on Fernando Pisani's redirect of a Pronger slapshot 16 seconds into the game. The Hurricanes then went ahead 2–1 on two power play goals by Eric Staal and Ray Whitney before the Oilers scored on the power play with a one-timer by Ales Hemsky to tie the game. Michael Peca then gave Edmonton a 3–2 lead with 17.4 seconds left in the first period. In the second period, Staal poked a goal between Jussi Markkanen and the post to tie the game. Early in the third period, Hurricanes centre Doug Weight got sandwiched by Chris Pronger and Raffi Torres, separating his shoulder and ending his night early. Weight would not return to play for the rest of the series, but would eventually raise the Cup. Carolina defenceman Aaron Ward also was injured in the third period, and with Carolina running out of healthy skaters, the Hurricanes were desperate to close out the game. With 7:47 remaining in the third period, Whitney missed what might have been the Hurricanes' best chance to win the series with a shot that just hit the post. The game went to overtime, where Steve Staios drew a penalty early in the period to put the Hurricanes on the power play. Fernando Pisani picked off a cross-ice pass from Cory Stillman and streaked in short-handed to beat Cam Ward top right corner (glove side) with a left-handed shot to score the first short-handed overtime goal in finals history, giving the Oilers the upset win.

Scoring summary
Period	Team	Goal	Assist(s)	Time	Score
1st	EDM	Fernando Pisani (11)	Chris Pronger (15) and Raffi Torres (6)	00:16	1–0 EDM
1st	CAR	Eric Staal (8) – pp	Doug Weight (13) and Bret Hedican (8)	05:54	1–1
1st	CAR	Ray Whitney (9) – pp	Eric Staal (18) and Mark Recchi (8)	10:16	2–1 CAR
1st	EDM	Ales Hemsky (6) – pp	Dick Tarnstrom (18) and Steve Staios (4)	13:25	2–2
1st	EDM	Michael Peca (6)	Ales Hemsky (10) and Chris Pronger (16)	13:25	3–2 EDM
2nd	CAR	Eric Staal (9) – pp	Ray Whitney and Corey Stillman (16)	13:25	3–3
3rd	None				
OT	EDM	Fernando Pisani (12) – sh	Unassisted	03:31	4–3 EDM
Penalty summary
Period	Team	Player	Penalty	Time	PIM
1st	EDM	Ales Hemsky	Tripping	02:27	2:00
1st	EDM	Matt Greene	Hooking	05:03	2:00
1st	EDM	Matt Greene	Holding	09:06	2:00
1st	CAR	Matt Cullen	Hooking	11:40	2:00
1st	EDM	Jaroslav Spacek	High-sticking	14:42	2:00
1st	CAR	Craig Adams	Hooking	17:17	2:00
1st	EDM	Dick Tarnstrom	Interference	18:46	2:00
1st	CAR	Mike Commodore	Goaltender interference	19:13	2:00
2nd	CAR	Bret Hedican	Tripping	02:43	2:00
2nd	EDM	Jarret Stoll	Hooking	04:11	2:00
2nd	EDM	Steve Staios	Hooking	08:20	2:00
2nd	CAR	Rod Brind'Amour	High-sticking	15:32	2:00
3rd	CAR	Mike Commodore	Holding	04:23	2:00
3rd	CAR	Josef Vasicek	Hooking	07:53	2:00
OT	EDM	Steve Staios	Tripping	03:03	2:00

Shots by period
Team	1	2	3	OT	Total
Edmonton	10	7	5	7	29
Carolina	14	8	2	0	24

=== Game six ===
June 17	Carolina Hurricanes	0–4	Edmonton Oilers	Rexall Place	Recap

Despite the emotional boost of Carolina winger Erik Cole returning to the ice for the first time since breaking his neck in March, Edmonton dominated for the entire 60 minutes. They shut out Carolina 4–0, tying the series after down 1–3 in front of a raucous crowd at Rexall Place. They scored three power-play goals and limited the Hurricanes to only 16 shots on goal. Edmonton held Carolina to seven shots through 40 minutes of play. Fernando Pisani scored his post-season-high fifth game-winning goal (and 13th in total, also tops amongst scorers in the 2006 playoffs). This game also marked Jussi Markkanen's first career playoff shutout. This turned out to be the final playoff game at Rexall Place, as the Oilers did not make it into playoffs again until 2017 but by then they relocated to Rogers Place.

Scoring summary
Period	Team	Goal	Assist(s)	Time	Score
1st	None				
2nd	EDM	Fernando Pisani (13) – pp	Mark Recchi (7) and Jaroslav Spacek (10)	01:45	1–0 EDM
2nd	EDM	Raffi Torres (4)	Steve Staios (5) and Fernando Pisani (4)	09:54	2–0 EDM
3rd	EDM	Ryan Smyth (7) – pp	Michael Peca (5) and Jaroslav Spacek (5)	03:04	3–0 EDM
3rd	EDM	Shawn Horcoff (7) – pp	Radek Dvorak (5) and Dick Tarnstrom (2)	13:05	4–0 EDM
Penalty summary
Period	Team	Player	Penalty	Time	PIM
1st	EDM	Steve Staios	Interference	01:09	2:00
1st	CAR	Bret Hedican	Roughing	06:02	2:00
1st	CAR	Bret Hedican	Roughing	11:41	2:00
1st	EDM	Fernando Pisani	Hooking	19:25	2:00
2nd	CAR	Bench (served by Andrew Ladd)	Too many men on the ice	01:08	2:00
2nd	CAR	Glen Wesley	Roughing	03:14	2:00
2nd	CAR	Cory Stillman	Hooking	05:48	2:00
2nd	EDM	Jaroslav Spacek	Embellishment	05:48	2:00
2nd	CAR	Bret Hedican	Tripping	10:22	2:00
2nd	EDM	Dick Tarnstrom	Interference	15:59	2:00
2nd	EDM	Jason Smith	Interference	18:22	2:00
3rd	CAR	Ray Whitney	Holding	02:46	2:00
3rd	CAR	Bench (served by Andrew Ladd)	Too many men on the ice	04:11	2:00
3rd	EDM	Matt Greene	Interference	09:29	2:00
3rd	CAR	Ray Whitney	Hooking	11:11	2:00
3rd	CAR	Matt Cullen	Roughing	15:04	2:00
3rd	EDM	Bench (served by Raffi Torres)	Too many men on the ice	15:41	2:00

Shots by period
Team	1	2	3	Total
Carolina	3	4	9	16
Edmonton	10	11	13	34

=== Game seven ===
June 19	Edmonton Oilers	1–3	Carolina Hurricanes	RBC Center	Recap

The Hurricanes returned to the RBC Center defeating the Oilers in Game 7, 3–1, to win the Stanley Cup. Aaron Ward and Frantisek Kaberle gave Carolina a 2–0 lead before Fernando Pisani scored for Edmonton 1:03 into the third period to cut the lead in half.

With just over a minute to go in regulation, the Oilers pulled the goalie in hopes of forcing overtime. A loose puck wound up on the stick of Bret Hedican, who passed to Eric Staal, who himself passed it down-ice to Justin Williams. Williams skated down the length of the ice and tapped the puck into the empty net, sealing the Stanley Cup for the Hurricanes. Cam Ward became the first NHL rookie goaltender to win the Stanley Cup Final series since Patrick Roy led the Montreal Canadiens in 1986, and he was also the first rookie since the Philadelphia Flyers' Ron Hextall in 1987 to be awarded the Conn Smythe Trophy as most valuable player in the playoffs. Staal (21 years and eight months) became the youngest player to lead the playoffs in scoring since Gordie Howe in 1949. The Hurricanes were the last team to win Game 7 of the Stanley Cup Final at home until the Florida Panthers did so in 2024, coincidentally against the Oilers as well.

Cory Stillman earned a Stanley Cup title for the second-straight season, having won in 2004 with the Tampa Bay Lightning, becoming the first player to win back-to-back titles with different teams since Claude Lemieux (1995 New Jersey Devils, 1996 Colorado Avalanche). Peter Laviolette became the second American-born coach to win the Stanley Cup.

The Hurricanes' victory ended Glen Wesley's 18-year drought without winning the Cup. He had played close to 1,500 regular season and playoff games before winning the Cup, the longest such drought in the NHL. Wesley was the last player remaining from the franchise's days as the Hartford Whalers. Other notable veterans to win their first Cup were Rod Brind'Amour, Doug Weight, Ray Whitney and Bret Hedican. Hedican was on the losing end of another final decided in a game seven, in 1994, while with the Vancouver Canucks. Mark Recchi won the second Cup of his career, having won it 15 years prior as a member of the 1991 Pittsburgh Penguins. He would later retire a Stanley Cup winner with the 2011 Boston Bruins, where he teamed up with Frantisek Kaberle's brother Tomas.

The Hurricanes became the third former World Hockey Association franchise to win the Stanley Cup, following the Oilers and Quebec Nordiques, who won as the Colorado Avalanche in 1996 and 2001.

The 2006 Stanley Cup playoffs marked the second time in a row that an Alberta-based team had made it to the finals only to lose in seven games to the Southeast Division champions, as the Calgary Flames were defeated by the Tampa Bay Lightning in the 2004 Stanley Cup Final. The Oilers were not able to complete their Cinderella run, having entered the playoffs seeded eighth, denying General Manager Kevin Lowe and Head Coach Craig MacTavish from joining Lester Patrick and Frank Boucher as the only duos to win the Stanley Cup together as players and then as a coach-managerial team, as the two were with the Oilers as players in 1987, 1988 and 1990 and the New York Rangers in 1994.

This was the first major-league professional championship for the state of North Carolina by a men's team (the Carolina Courage of the defunct Women's United Soccer Association won the 2002 Founders Cup). Until the Hurricanes' second Stanley Cup win in 2026, this was also the only Big 4 championship by an active North Carolina–based team in any of the four major league sports. The Hurricanes made it to the 2002 Stanley Cup Final, losing to the Detroit Red Wings in five games; and the Carolina Panthers made it to Super Bowl XXXVIII, but lost to the New England Patriots, and Super Bowl 50, losing to the Denver Broncos.

Scoring summary
Period	Team	Goal	Assist(s)	Time	Score
1st	CAR	Aaron Ward (2)	Mark Recchi (9) and Matt Cullen (13)	01:26	1–0 CAR
2nd	CAR	Frantisek Kaberle (2) – pp	Corey Stillman (17) and Matt Cullen (14)	04:18	2–0 CAR
3rd	EDM	Fernando Pisani (14)	Rem Murray (4) and Raffi Torres (7)	01:03	2–1 CAR
3rd	CAR	Justin Williams (7) – en	Eric Staal (19) and Bret Hedican (9)	18:59	3–1 CAR
Penalty summary
Period	Team	Player	Penalty	Time	PIM
1st	CAR	Eric Staal	Goaltender interference	03:17	2:00
1st	EDM	Jaroslav Spacek	Holding	11:03	2:00
1st	EDM	Matt Greene	Interference	17:33	2:00
1st	EDM	Ethan Moreau	High-sticking	19:55	2:00
2nd	EDM	Jaroslav Spacek	Holding	04:10	2:00
2nd	CAR	Niclas Wallin	Hooking	16:16	2:00
2nd	CAR	Aaron Ward	Delay of game (puck over glass)	16:21	2:00
2nd	EDM	Ryan Smyth	Hooking	17:21	2:00
3rd	CAR	Bret Hedican	Roughing	12:38	2:00
3rd	CAR	Justin Williams	Roughing	19:39	2:00
3rd	EDM	Ryan Smyth	Roughing	19:39	2:00

Shots by period
Team	1	2	3	Total
Edmonton	5	8	10	23
Carolina	10	11	6	27

== Team rosters ==
Years indicated in boldface under the "Finals appearance" column signify that the player won the Stanley Cup in the given year.

=== Carolina Hurricanes ===
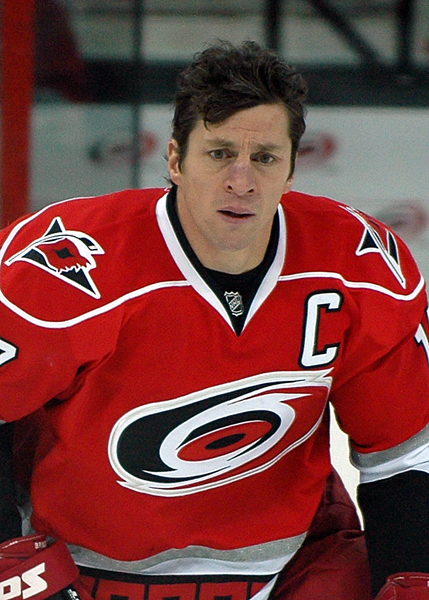
Rod Brind'Amour captained the Hurricanes, having previously served as an alternate in the 2002 run with the team

#	Nat	Player	Position	Hand	Age	Acquired	Place of birth	Finals appearance
14	(United States)	Kevyn Adams – **A**	C	R	31	2001–02	Washington, D.C.	second (2002)
27	(Canada)	Craig Adams	RW	R	29	1996	Seria, Brunei	second (2002)
48	(Russia)	Anton Babchuk	D	R	22	2005–06	Kyiv, Soviet Union	first (did not play)
17	(Canada)	Rod Brind'Amour – **C**	C	L	35	1999–2000	Ottawa, Ontario	third (1997, 2002)
26	(United States)	Erik Cole	RW	L	27	1998	Oswego, New York	second (2002)
22	(Canada)	Mike Commodore	D	R	26	2005–06	Fort Saskatchewan, Alberta	second (2004)
8	(United States)	Matt Cullen	C	L	29	2005–06	Virginia, Minnesota	first
29	(Switzerland)	Martin Gerber	G	L	31	2005–06	Burgdorf, Switzerland	second (2003), (did not play)
6	(United States)	Bret Hedican	D	L	35	2001–02	Saint Paul, Minnesota	third (1994, 2002)
24	(United States)	Andrew Hutchinson	D	R	26	2005–06	Evanston, Illinois	first (did not play)
5	(Czech Republic)	Frantisek Kaberle	D	L	32	2005–06	Kladno, Czechoslovakia	first
16	(Canada)	Andrew Ladd	LW	L	20	2004	Maple Ridge, British Columbia	first
59	(United States)	Chad LaRose	RW	R	24	2005–06	Fraser, Michigan	first
18	(Canada)	Mark Recchi	RW	L	38	2005–06	Kamloops, British Columbia	second (**1991**)
12	(Canada)	Eric Staal	C	L	21	2003	Thunder Bay, Ontario	first
61	(Canada)	Cory Stillman – **A**	LW	L	32	2005–06	Peterborough, Ontario	second (**2004**)
70	(Russia)	Oleg Tverdovsky	D	L	30	2005–06	Donetsk, Soviet Union	second (**2003**)
63	(Czech Republic)	Josef Vasicek	C/RW	L	25	1998	Havlíčkův Brod, Czechoslovakia	second (2002)
7	(Sweden)	Niclas Wallin	D	L	31	2000	Boden, Sweden	second (2002)
4	(Canada)	Aaron Ward	D	R	33	2001–02	Windsor, Ontario	fourth (**1997**, **1998**, 2002)
30	(Canada)	Cam Ward	G	L	22	2002	Saskatoon, Saskatchewan	first
39	(United States)	Doug Weight	C	L	35	2005–06	Warren, Michigan	first
2	(Canada)	Glen Wesley – **A**	D	L	37	1994–95	Red Deer, Alberta	fourth (1988, 1990, 2002)
13	(Canada)	Ray Whitney	LW	R	34	2005–06	Fort Saskatchewan, Alberta	first
11	(Canada)	Justin Williams	RW	R	24	2003–04	Cobourg, Ontario	first

=== Edmonton Oilers ===
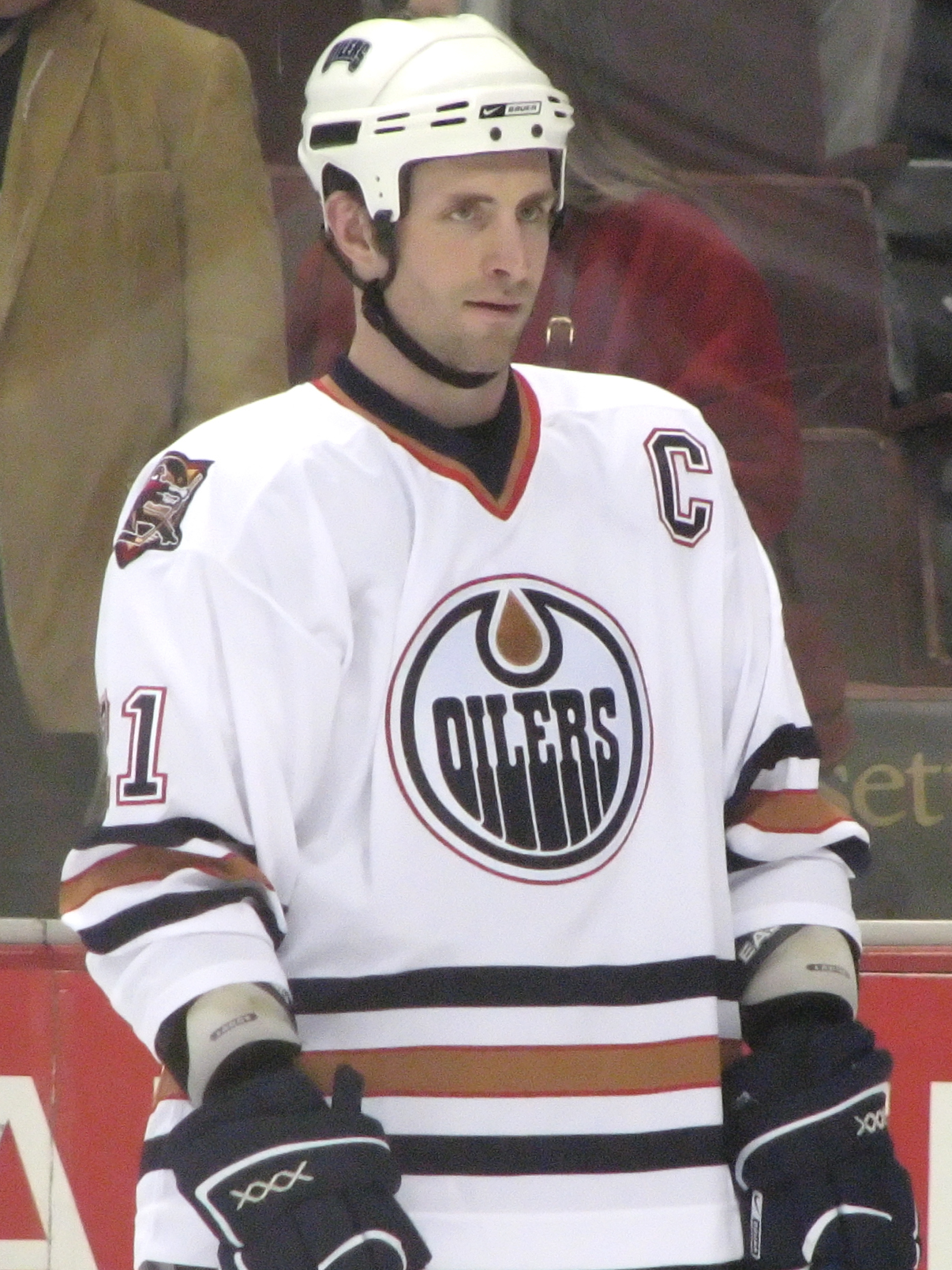
Jason Smith captained the Oilers, making their first appearance in the Final in sixteen years.

#	Nat	Player	Position	Hand	Age	Acquired	Place of birth	Finals appearance
47	(Canada)	Marc-Andre Bergeron	D	L	25	2001–02	Saint-Louis-de-France, Quebec	first
29	(United States)	Ty Conklin	G	L	30	2001–02	Phoenix, Arizona	first
20	(Czech Republic)	Radek Dvorak	RW	R	29	2002–03	Tábor, Czechoslovakia	second (1996)
2	(United States)	Matt Greene	D	R	23	2002	Grand Ledge, Michigan	first
13	(Canada)	Todd Harvey	RW	R	31	2005–06	Hamilton, Ontario	first
83	(Czech Republic)	Ales Hemsky	RW	R	22	2001	Pardubice, Czechoslovakia	first
10	(Canada)	Shawn Horcoff	C	L	27	1998	Trail, British Columbia	first
27	(Canada)	Georges Laraque	RW	R	29	1995	Montreal, Quebec	first
30	(Finland)	Jussi Markkanen	G	L	31	2001	Imatra, Finland	first
18	(Canada)	Ethan Moreau – **A**	LW	L	30	1998–99	Huntsville, Ontario	first
22	(Canada)	Rem Murray	C	L	33	2005–06	Stratford, Ontario	first
37	(Canada)	Michael Peca	C	R	32	2005–06	Toronto, Ontario	second (1999)
45	(United States)	Toby Petersen	C	L	27	2005–06	Minneapolis, Minnesota	first (did not play)
34	(Canada)	Fernando Pisani	RW	L	29	1996	Edmonton, Alberta	first
44	(Canada)	Chris Pronger	D	L	31	2005–06	Dryden, Ontario	first
35	(Canada)	Dwayne Roloson	G	L	36	2005–06	Simcoe, Ontario	second (1999)
12	(Russia)	Sergei Samsonov	LW	R	27	2005–06	Moscow, Soviet Union	first
21	(Canada)	Jason Smith – **C**	D	R	32	1998–99	Calgary, Alberta	first
94	(Canada)	Ryan Smyth – **A**	LW	L	30	1994	Banff, Alberta	first
6	(Czech Republic)	Jaroslav Spacek	D	L	32	2005–06	Rokycany, Czechoslovakia	first
24	(Canada)	Steve Staios	D	R	32	2001–02	Hamilton, Ontario	first
16	(Canada)	Jarret Stoll	C	R	23	2002	Melville, Saskatchewan	first
23	(Sweden)	Dick Tarnstrom	D	L	31	2005–06	Sundbyberg, Sweden	first
14	(Canada)	Raffi Torres	LW	L	24	2002–03	Toronto, Ontario	first
26	(United States)	Brad Winchester	LW	L	25	2000	Madison, Wisconsin	first (did not play)

== Stanley Cup engraving ==
The 2006 Stanley Cup was presented to Hurricanes captain Rod Brind'Amour by NHL Commissioner Gary Bettman following the Hurricanes' 3–1 win over the Oilers in game seven.

The following Hurricanes players and staff had their names engraved on the Stanley Cup

2005–06 Carolina Hurricanes

=== Players ===
Centers

Wingers

- 11 Justin Williams
- 13 Ray Whitney
- 16 Andrew Ladd
- 18 Mark Recchi
- 27 Craig Adams
- 26 Erik Cole
- 59 Chad LaRose
- 61 Cory Stillman (A)

Defencemen

- 2 Glen Wesley (A)
- 4 Aaron Ward
- 5 Frantisek Kaberle
- 6 Bret Hedican
- 7 Niclas Wallin
- 24 Andrew Hutchinson †
- 22 Mike Commodore
- 48 Anton Babchuk †
- 70 Oleg Tverdovsky

Goaltenders

- 29 Martin Gerber
- 30 Cam Ward
- * Played both centre and wing.
- † Exemption granted to engrave the name of a player who did not automatically qualify. (Note: Automatic qualification for a player's name to be engraved on the Stanley Cup: Playing in (for a goaltender, dressing for) at least one Stanley Cup Final game or at least half of regular season games for the Stanley Cup winning team.)

=== Coaching and administrative staff ===
- Peter Karmanos, Jr. (CEO/Owner/Governor), Thomas Thewes (Owner), Jim Rutherford (President/General Manager), Davin Olsen (Vice President-Arena Manager)
- Jason Karmanos (Vice President/Asst. General Manager), Mike Amendola (Chief Financial Officer), Peter Laviolette (Head Coach)
- Kevin McCarthy (Asst. Coach) Jeff Daniels (Asst. Coach)‡, Greg Stefan (Goaltending Coach/Pro Scout), Chris Huffine (Video Coordinator)
- Skip Cunningham (Asst. Equipment Manager, Wally Tatomir (Equipment Manager), Bob Gorman (Asst. Equipment Manager), Peter Freisen (Athletic Therapist/Strength-Conditioning Coach)
- Chris Stewart (Asst. Athletic Therapist), Brian Tatum (Director of Team Services), Kelly Kirwin (Event Coordinator-Hockey Operations), Mike Sundheim (Director of Media Relations), Kyle Hanlin (Manager of Media Relations)
- Sheldon Ferguson (Director Amateur Scouting), Marshall Johnston (Director Pro Scouting), Claude Larose (Scout), Ron Smith (Scout)
- Tony MacDonald (Scout), Martin Madden (Scout), Bert Marshall (Scout), Tom Rowe (Scout)

=== Engraving notes ===
- #48 Anton Babchuk (D) played in 22 regular season games for Carolina, previously 17 for Chicago. #24 Andrew Hutchinson (D) played in 36 regular season games for Carolina. They did not play in the playoffs (both were healthy scratches). As they did not automatically qualify, Carolina successfully requested an exemption to engrave their names.
- Eric Staal's name was misspelled ERIC STAAAL on the Stanley Cup. Engraver Louise St. Jacques was able to correct the mistake and removed the last "A."
- Frantisek Kaberle became the first player to win the Olympic bronze medal in ice hockey (with team Czech Republic) and the Stanley Cup (with Carolina) in the same year.
- Canadian Craig Adams was the first player born in Brunei, but he grew up in Calgary.
- Nine players remained from the Carolina team that lost to Detroit in the 2002 Final: Craig Adams, Kevyn Adams, Rod Brind'Amour, Erik Cole, Bret Hedican, Josef Vasicek, Niclas Wallin, Glen Wesley, and Aaron Ward. Jeff Daniels also played in 2002, but was an Assistant Coach in 2006. Assistant Coach Kevin McCarthy was the only remaining member of 2002 Carolina Coaching Staff.
- The ring with winners from 1940–41 to 1952–53 was retired to make room for a new ring at the bottom. The ring from 1940–41 to 1952–53 was retired one year later than originally planned because of the 2004–05 NHL lockout. NHL decided to include "2004-05 season not played" left of Carolina Hurricanes section.
- #37 Keith Aucoin (RW/C – 6 regular season games), #34 David Gove (LW/C – 1 regular season game), and #50 Craig Kowalski (G – 0 regular season games, 18 for Florida of the ECHL) were on the roster during the Final were left off the Stanley Cup engraving due to not qualifying. None played in or dressed for the playoffs (all were healthy scratches). They were included in the team picture and received championship rings.
- Dr. Douglas Martini (Head Physician-Orthopedist), Dr. Jay Stevens (Head Physician-General Practitioner), Dr. Mike Peters (Team Eye Doctor), Dr. Ken Carnes (Team Neurologist), Dr. Tom Long (Team Dentist), and Dr. Gabreil Rich (Team Dentist); were left off the Stanley Cup engraving, but included in the team picture and received championship rings.

== Television ==
In the United States, this was the first Stanley Cup Final to be broadcast on NBC and OLN (later Versus, currently NBC Sports Network). Games one and two were on OLN, while the remainder of the series was on NBC. NBC's broadcast of game seven drew a 3.3 rating, a 21% drop from ABC's 4.2 for game seven in 2004. However, some NBC affiliates didn't air game seven live. Overall, NBC had an average rating of 2.3 for its five telecasts of the final, down 12% from ABC's 2004 average.

In Canada, the CBC's broadcast of game seven drew 4.739 million viewers. However, it included pre-game and post-game coverage. The game itself drew 5.553 million.

== See also ==
- 2005–06 NHL season
- List of Stanley Cup champions

== Notes ==
Preceded by Tampa Bay Lightning; 2004	Carolina Hurricanes; Stanley Cup champions 2006	Succeeded by Anaheim Ducks; 2007
