= Velká Dobrá =

- Municipality
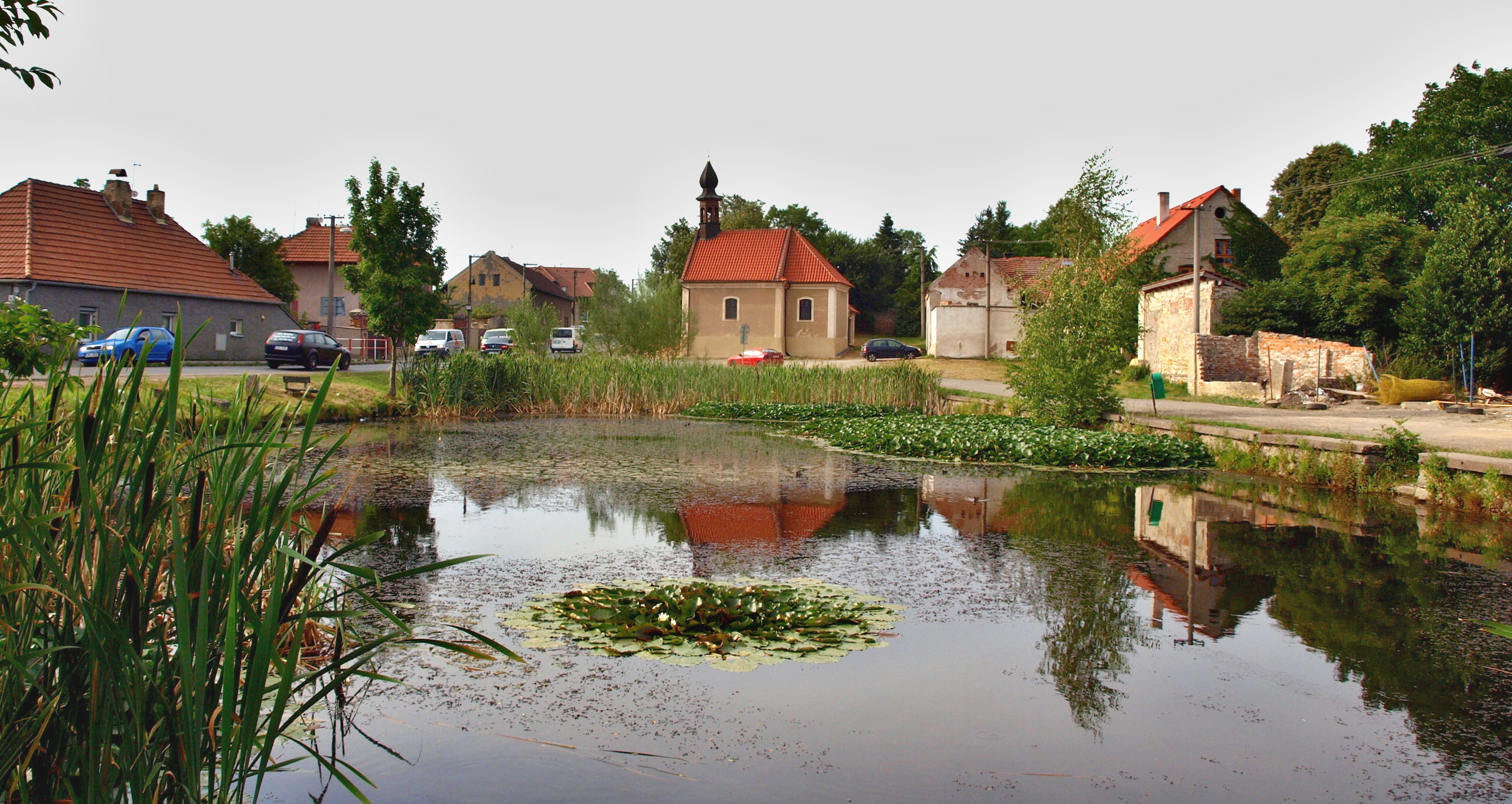
- Centre of Velká Dobrá

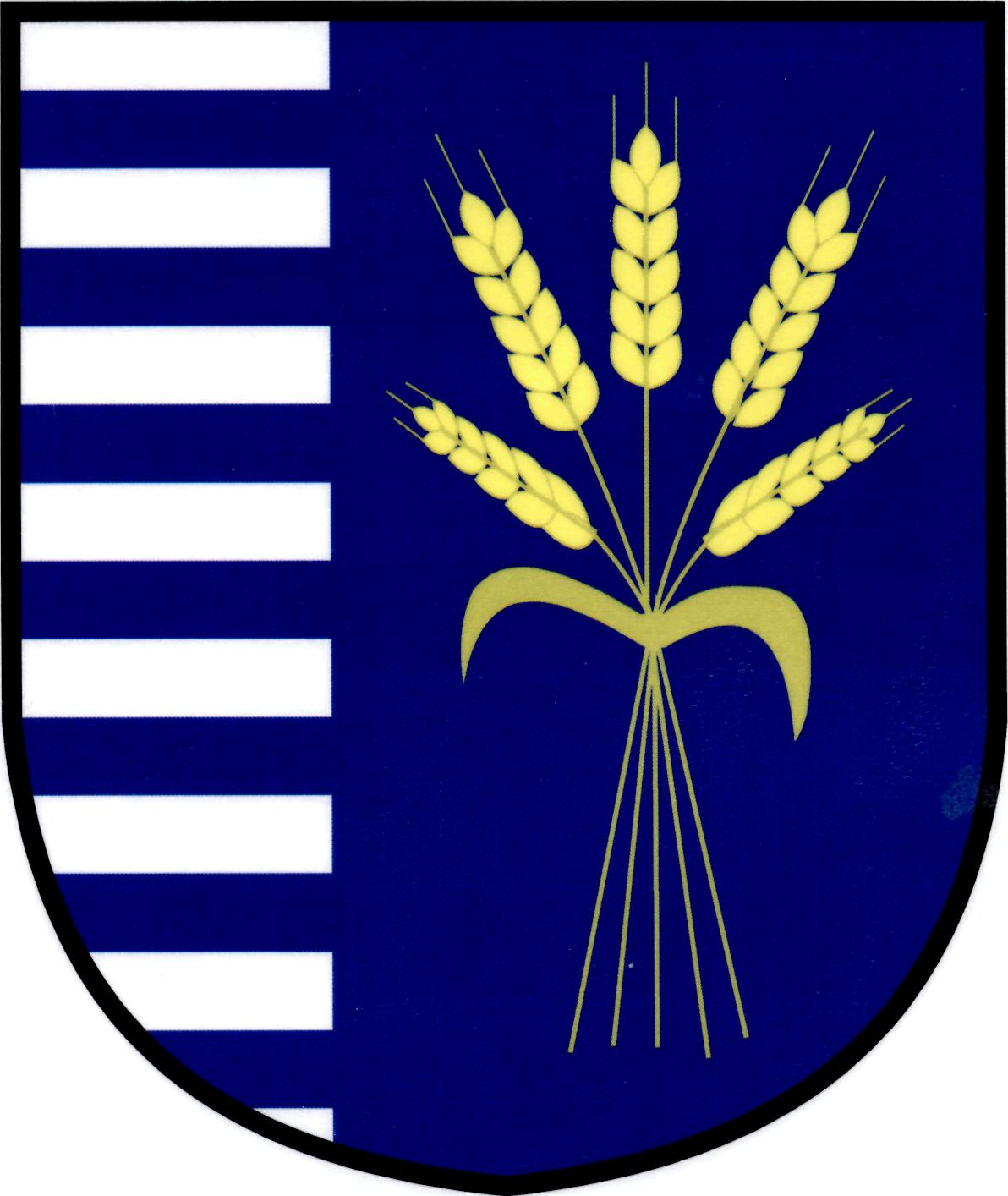
- Flag Coat of arms

- Location in the Czech Republic
- Coordinates: 50°6′35″N 14°4′12″E
- Country: Czech Republic
- Region: Central Bohemian
- District: Kladno
- First mentioned: 1328

Area
  - Total: 8.42 km^{2} (3.25 sq mi)
- Elevation: 409 m (1,342 ft)

Population (2026-01-01)
  - Total: 1,785
  - Density: 212/km^{2} (549/sq mi)
- Time zone: UTC+1 (CET)
  - Summer (DST): UTC+2 (CEST)
- Postal code: 273 61
- Website: www.velkadobra.cz

Velká Dobrá is a municipality and village in Kladno District in the Central Bohemian Region of the Czech Republic. It has about 1,800 inhabitants.

== Etymology ==
Velká Dobrá literally means 'great good' or 'large good' in Czech. The name refers to "good water" or "fertile land". There were formerly two separate municipalities, Malá Dobrá and Velká Dobrá, earlier called Hořejší Dobrá and Dolejší Dobrá (i.e. 'upper' and 'lower' Dobrá).

== Geography ==
Velká Dobrá is located about 4 kilometres (2 mi) southwest of Kladno and 16 km (10 mi) northwest of Prague. It lies in the Křivoklát Highlands. The highest point is the hill Veselov at 429 m (1,407 ft) above sea level.

== History ==
There is evidence of human inhabitation in the region of Velká Dobrá since prehistory. A late 19th century archaeological investigation led by Josef Szombathy discovered a large middle Bronze Age (c. 1200 BCE) grave site near the village in the forest of Hora. A monument constructed over 50 years stood over the largest grave mound. Around sixty graves were investigated, yielding bronze weapons, tools and utensils, several of which were sent for display at museums in Prague and Vienna.

The first written mention of Dobrá is from 1328. Two strongholds existed in the area. The upper stronghold in Velká Dobrá was first mentioned in 1393, but was destroyed during the Hussite Wars. It was restored in 1549, converted into a granary after the Thirty Years' War, and finally demolished in the first half of the 19th century. The lower stronghold in Malá Dobrá was first documented in 1396. It was repeatedly abandoned and then restored. In the 1770s, it was rebuilt for the needs of a local farmyard.

The longest ruling owners of the area were the noble families of Kladenský of Kladno (1412–1543) and Žďárský of Žďár (1543–1688). After that, the owners changed frequently. In 1548, Malá Dobrá had eight inhabitants and Velká Dobrá had nine inhabitants. The area sustained extensive damage during the Thirty Years' War. After 1648, six of the 14 farms in Velká Dobrá were abandoned. Gradually, the number of houses and inhabitants increased.

In 1929, the Unhošť administrative district was abolished and Malá Dobrá and Velká Dobrá became parts of Kladno District. In 1935, the municipalities of Malá Dobrá and Velká Dobrá were merged.

== Demographics ==
Historical population

Year	Pop.	±%
1869	748	—
1880	976	+30.5%
1890	1,070	+9.6%
1900	1,145	+7.0%
1910	1,323	+15.5%

Year	Pop.	±%
1921	1,377	+4.1%
1930	1,319	−4.2%
1950	1,263	−4.2%
1961	1,274	+0.9%
1970	1,180	−7.4%

Year	Pop.	±%
1980	1,029	−12.8%
1991	1,008	−2.0%
2001	1,084	+7.5%
2011	1,681	+55.1%
2021	1,853	+10.2%

Source: Censuses

== Transport ==
The D6 motorway from Prague to Karlovy Vary runs through the municipality.

Kladno Airport is located in the municipality. It is a public domestic civil airport.

== Sights ==
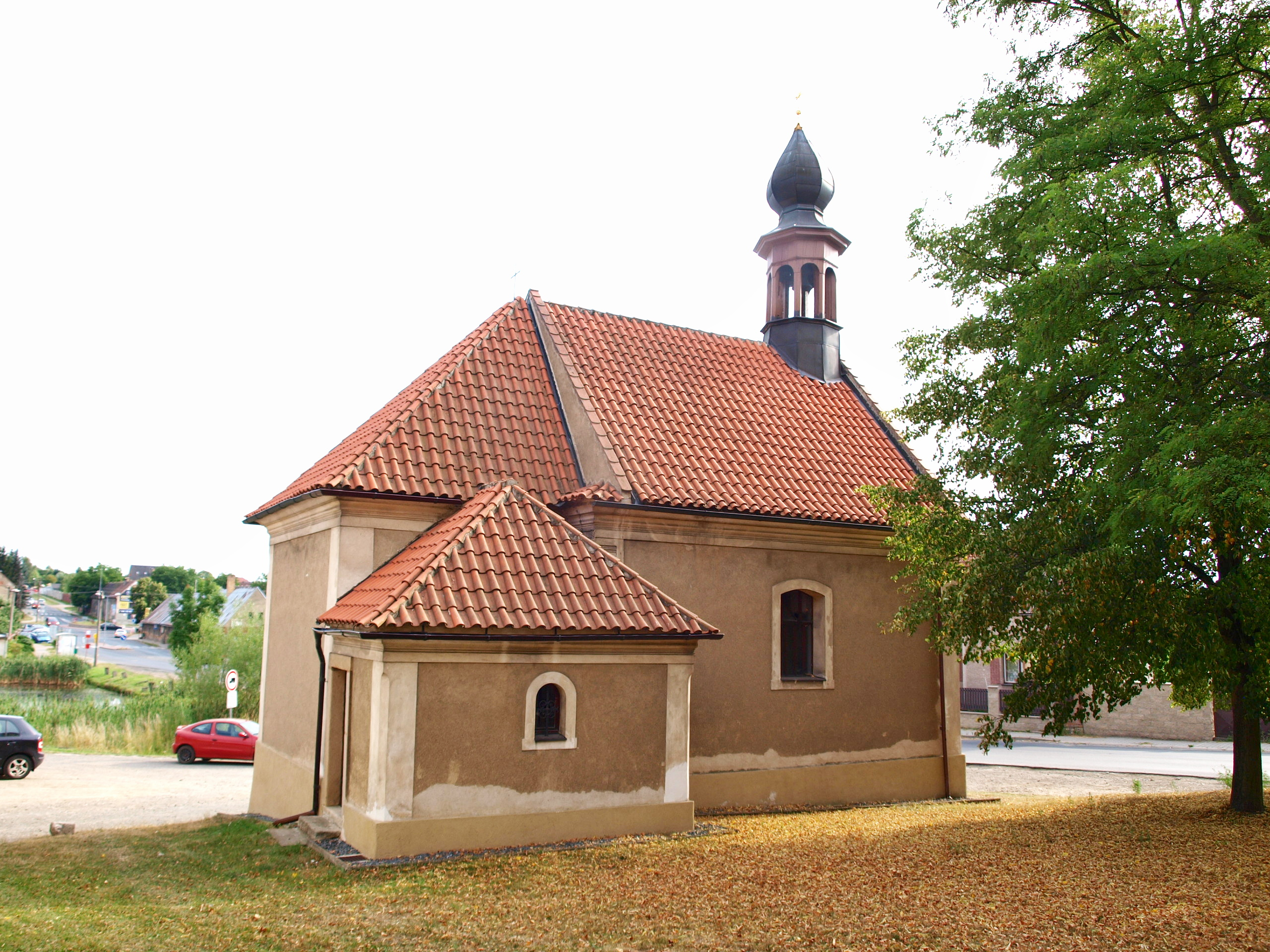
Chapel of the Finding of the Holy Cross

The most valuable monument of Velká Dobrá is the Chapel of the Finding of the Holy Cross. It was built in 1765. In 1816, it was demolished and rebuilt in its current form. Next to the chapel is a statue of Saint John of Nepomuk dating from 1753.

== Notable people ==
- Václav Nosek (1892–1955), communist politician, Minister of the Interior in 1945–1953
- Mirek Smíšek (1925–2013), Czech-New Zealand potter
- Tomáš Kaberle (born 1978), ice hockey player
