= Jaroslav Špaček =

Czech ice hockey player (born 1974)

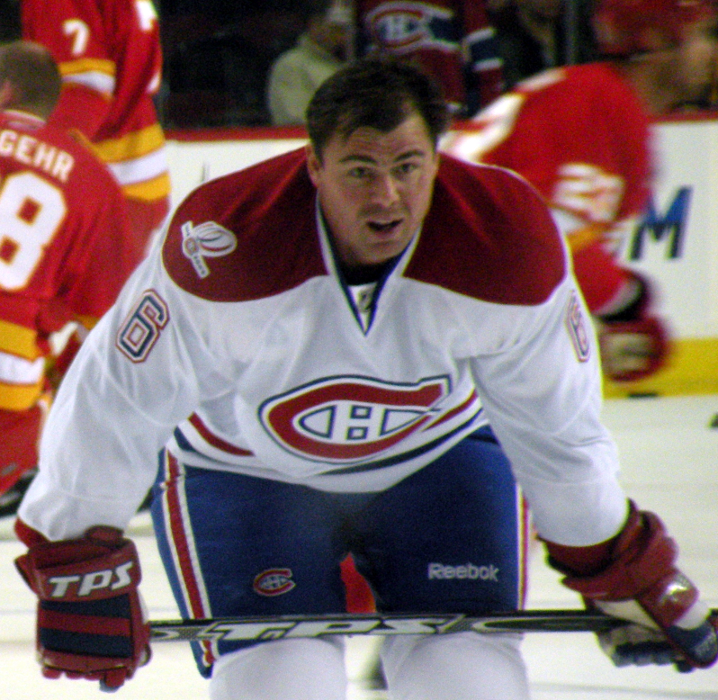
- Born: February 11, 1974 (age 52) Rokycany, Czechoslovakia
- Height: 5 ft 11 in (180 cm)
- Weight: 206 lb (93 kg; 14 st 10 lb)
- Position: Defence
- Shot: Left
- Played for: HC Plzeň; Färjestad BK; Florida Panthers; Chicago Blackhawks; Columbus Blue Jackets; HC Sparta Praha; Edmonton Oilers; Buffalo Sabres; Montreal Canadiens; Carolina Hurricanes
- National team: Czech Republic
- NHL draft: 117th overall, 1998; Florida Panthers
- Playing career: 1992–2012
Medal record
Representing Czech Republic
Ice hockey
Olympic Games
Gold medal – first place	1998 Nagano
Bronze medal – third place	2006 Torino
World Championships
Gold medal – first place	1999 Lillehammer
Gold medal – first place	2001 Nuremberg
Gold medal – first place	2005 Vienna

Jaroslav Špaček (Czech pronunciation: [ˈjaroslaf ˈʃpatʃɛk]; born February 11, 1974) is a Czech former professional ice hockey defenceman who played in the National Hockey League (NHL) for over 13 seasons with the Florida Panthers, Chicago Blackhawks, Columbus Blue Jackets, Edmonton Oilers, Buffalo Sabres, Montreal Canadiens and the Carolina Hurricanes.

== Playing career ==
Špaček was drafted in the fifth round, 117th overall, by the Florida Panthers in the 1998 NHL entry draft.

On January 26, 2006, the Chicago Blackhawks traded Špaček to the Edmonton Oilers in exchange for Tony Salmelainen. In 2005–06, Špaček was part of the Cinderella Edmonton Oilers team that made a run to the 2006 Stanley Cup Finals. However, the Oilers lost in Game 7 of the finals to the Carolina Hurricanes. Špaček had three goals and 11 assists in the 2006 Playoffs. He was only one victory away from joining the Triple Gold Club.

On July 5, 2006, Špaček signed a three-year contract with the Buffalo Sabres. In the 2006–07 season, he helped the Sabres reach the Eastern Conference Finals. Špaček was named an alternate captain for the month of December 2007 and captain for the month of January under the Sabres 2007–08 rotating captain and alternate captains system. In the 2008–09 season, Špaček tied a career-high with 45 points in 80 games for the Sabres.

On July 1, 2009, Špaček signed a three-year contract worth $11.5 million with the Montreal Canadiens.

In the final year of his contract in the 2011–12 season, on December 9, 2011, Montreal traded Špaček to the Carolina Hurricanes in exchange for defenceman Tomáš Kaberle.

A free agent, and with the 2012–13 NHL lockout in effect well into the 2012–13 season, Špaček effectively announced his retirement on November 19, 2012. He became assistant coach for HC Škoda Plzeň and was also added to Plzeň's roster before the trade deadline. He was forced into playing again in the final series due to injuries to Plzeň's defencemen, and he helped Plzeň win its first-ever Czech Extraliga title.

In 2014, Špaček was named assistant coach for the Czech team at the 2014 IIHF World Championship.

Špaček was inducted into the Czech Ice Hockey Hall of Fame on November 3, 2016.

== Personal life ==
Špaček's son, David, is a professional ice hockey player who was drafted in the fifth round, 153rd overall, by the Minnesota Wild in the 2022 NHL entry draft.

== Career statistics ==
=== Regular season and playoffs ===
			Regular season					Playoffs
Season	Team	League	GP	G	A	Pts	PIM	GP	G	A	Pts	PIM
1991–92	TJ Škoda Rokycany	TCH U20	34	7	14	21	—	—	—	—	—	—
1992–93	TJ Škoda Rokycany	TCH U20	19	12	8	20	—	—	—	—	—	—
1992–93	HC Škoda Plzeň	TCH	16	1	3	4	—	—	—	—	—	—
1993–94	HC Škoda Plzeň	ELH	34	2	10	12	37	—	—	—	—	—
1994–95	HC Interconnex Plzeň	ELH	38	4	8	12	14	3	1	0	1	2
1995–96	HC ZKZ Plzeň	ELH	40	3	9	12	30	3	0	1	1	4
1996–97	HC ZKZ Plzeň	ELH	52	9	29	38	44	—	—	—	—	—
1997–98	Färjestad BK	SEL	45	10	16	26	63	12	2	5	7	14
1998–99	Florida Panthers	NHL	63	3	12	15	28	—	—	—	—	—
1998–99	Beast of New Haven	AHL	14	4	8	12	15	—	—	—	—	—
1999–2000	Florida Panthers	NHL	82	10	26	36	53	4	0	0	0	0
2000–01	Florida Panthers	NHL	12	2	1	3	8	—	—	—	—	—
2000–01	Chicago Blackhawks	NHL	50	5	8	13	20	—	—	—	—	—
2001–02	Chicago Blackhawks	NHL	60	3	10	13	29	—	—	—	—	—
2001–02	Columbus Blue Jackets	NHL	14	2	3	5	24	—	—	—	—	—
2002–03	Columbus Blue Jackets	NHL	81	9	36	45	80	—	—	—	—	—
2003–04	Columbus Blue Jackets	NHL	58	5	17	22	45	—	—	—	—	—
2004–05	HC Lasselsberger Plzeň	ELH	30	3	8	11	26	—	—	—	—	—
2004–05	HC Slavia Praha	ELH	17	4	9	13	29	7	0	2	2	8
2005–06	Chicago Blackhawks	NHL	45	7	17	24	72	—	—	—	—	—
2005–06	Edmonton Oilers	NHL	31	5	14	19	24	24	3	11	14	24
2006–07	Buffalo Sabres	NHL	65	5	16	21	62	16	0	0	0	10
2007–08	Buffalo Sabres	NHL	60	9	23	32	42	—	—	—	—	—
2008–09	Buffalo Sabres	NHL	80	8	37	45	38	—	—	—	—	—
2009–10	Montreal Canadiens	NHL	74	3	18	21	50	10	1	3	4	6
2010–11	Montreal Canadiens	NHL	59	1	15	16	45	7	0	0	0	4
2011–12	Montreal Canadiens	NHL	12	0	3	3	2	—	—	—	—	—
2011–12	Carolina Hurricanes	NHL	34	5	7	12	6	—	—	—	—	—
2012–13	HC Škoda Plzeň	ELH	—	—	—	—	—	3	0	1	1	0
ELH totals			211	25	73	98	180	20	1	6	7	22
NHL totals			880	82	263	345	628	61	4	14	28	44

=== International ===
Year	Team	Event	GP	G	A	Pts	PIM
1994	Czech Republic	WJC	7	2	0	2	8
1998	Czech Republic	OG	6	0	0	0	4
1999	Czech Republic	WC	12	1	5	6	8
2001	Czech Republic	WC	9	0	3	3	4
2002	Czech Republic	OG	4	0	0	0	0
2002	Czech Republic	WC	7	1	2	3	8
2003	Czech Republic	WC	9	1	5	6	4
2004	Czech Republic	WC	6	2	1	3	6
2004	Czech Republic	WCH	4	0	0	0	0
2005	Czech Republic	WC	9	1	0	1	0
2006	Czech Republic	OG	8	0	1	1	2
Senior totals			72	6	17	23	36

Sporting positions
Preceded by Brian Campbell	Buffalo Sabres captain January 2008	Succeeded by Jochen Hecht
