= Niclas Wallin =

Swedish ice hockey player (born 1975)

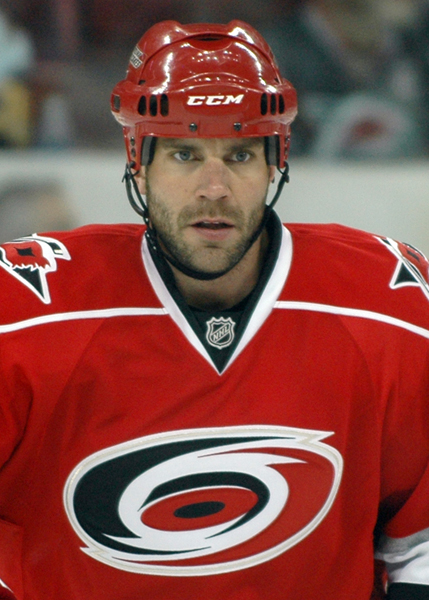
- Wallin with the Hurricanes in 2009
- Born: 20 February 1975 (age 51) Boden, Sweden
- Height: 6 ft 3 in (191 cm)
- Weight: 220 lb (100 kg; 15 st 10 lb)
- Position: Defence
- Shot: Left
- Played for: Brynäs IF; Carolina Hurricanes; Luleå HF; San Jose Sharks
- National team: Sweden
- NHL draft: 97th overall, 2000; Carolina Hurricanes
- Playing career: 1996–2012

Niclas Wallin (born 20 February 1975) is a Swedish former professional ice hockey player who played in the National Hockey League (NHL). He won the Stanley Cup with the Carolina Hurricanes in 2006.

== Playing career ==
Wallin's career began in Bodens IK, his hometown team. Having had a breakthrough in the 1995–96 season, he was picked up by the Swedish Elitserien team Brynäs. After spending some years with Brynäs, Wallin was drafted in the fourth round, 97th overall by the Hurricanes at the 2000 NHL entry draft and remained at the team until February 2010. During the 2004–05 NHL lockout, Wallin returned to his native Sweden, playing 39 games for Luleå. In 2006, he won his first Stanley Cup with the Carolina Hurricanes.

Niclas Wallin is known to many Hurricanes fans as The Secret Weapon due to his timing with postseason goals. He has only scored four of them, but all of them have been game winners, and three have come in overtime, including games against the Montreal Canadiens and Toronto Maple Leafs in 2002 and game two of the 2006 postseason series against the New Jersey Devils. The fourth one was a game-winning goal in game two of the 2011 Western Conference Semi-Finals against the Detroit Red Wings.

Wallin was featured in a Top 10 list on TSN's Sportscentre in 2006 after he scored a famous own goal in a game against the Washington Capitals. A delayed penalty was called on Washington, and Carolina removed their goalie from the net to get an extra skater. Wallin was chased out of the offensive zone by Alexander Ovechkin and tried to deke around a passing referee. When he did this, Wallin lost control of the puck and it sailed more than 100 feet into Carolina's open net.

On 7 February 2010, it was announced that Wallin was traded to the San Jose Sharks along with a fifth-round draft pick in exchange for a second-round draft pick that originally belonged to the Buffalo Sabres in the 2010 NHL entry draft.

On 26 June 2010, Wallin re-signed to a one-year contract to remain with the Sharks for the following 2010–11 season.

On 15 June 2011, Wallin signed a three-year contract to return home to captain Luleå HF of the Elitserien. After one season with the club, Wallin ended his professional career due to injury.

== International play ==
After a lengthy hockey career, Wallin finally got the call to represent Sweden in the 2008 World Championships, in which he did not disappoint, scoring two goals and two assists in seven games.

== Career statistics ==
=== Regular season and playoffs ===
			Regular season					Playoffs
Season	Team	League	GP	G	A	Pts	PIM	GP	G	A	Pts	PIM
1994–95	Bodens IK	J20	30	2	13	15	125	—	—	—	—	—
1994–95	Bodens IK	SWE-2	13	0	0	0	0	2	0	0	0	0
1995–96	Bodens IK	J20	2	2	2	4	0	—	—	—	—	—
1995–96	Bodens IK	SWE-2	30	2	7	9	26	2	0	1	1	2
1996–97	Brynäs IF	SEL	47	1	1	2	16	—	—	—	—	—
1997–98	Brynäs IF	SEL	44	2	3	5	57	3	0	1	1	4
1998–99	Brynäs IF	SEL	46	2	4	6	52	14	0	0	0	8
1999–00	Brynäs IF	SEL	48	7	9	16	73	11	2	1	3	14
2000–01	Cincinnati Cyclones	IHL	8	1	2	3	4	3	0	0	0	2
2000–01	Carolina Hurricanes	NHL	37	2	3	5	21	3	0	0	0	2
2001–02	Carolina Hurricanes	NHL	52	1	2	3	36	23	2	1	3	12
2002–03	Carolina Hurricanes	NHL	77	2	8	10	71	—	—	—	—	—
2003–04	Carolina Hurricanes	NHL	57	3	7	10	51	—	—	—	—	—
2004–05	Luleå HF	SEL	39	6	7	13	89	3	0	1	1	6
2005–06	Carolina Hurricanes	NHL	50	4	4	8	42	25	1	4	5	14
2006–07	Carolina Hurricanes	NHL	67	2	8	10	48	—	—	—	—	—
2007–08	Carolina Hurricanes	NHL	66	2	6	8	54	—	—	—	—	—
2008–09	Carolina Hurricanes	NHL	64	2	8	10	42	18	0	0	0	4
2009–10	Carolina Hurricanes	NHL	47	0	5	5	26	—	—	—	—	—
2009–10	San Jose Sharks	NHL	23	0	2	2	23	6	0	0	0	2
2010–11	San Jose Sharks	NHL	74	3	5	8	46	18	1	3	4	10
2011–12	Luleå HF	SEL	33	0	3	3	35	5	0	0	0	0
SEL totals			257	18	27	45	322	36	2	3	5	32
NHL totals			614	21	58	79	460	93	4	8	12	44

=== International ===
Year	Team	Event	Result	GP	G	A	Pts	PIM
2008	Sweden	WC	4th	7	2	2	4	33
Senior totals				7	2	2	4	33
