= Cory Stillman =

Canadian ice hockey player

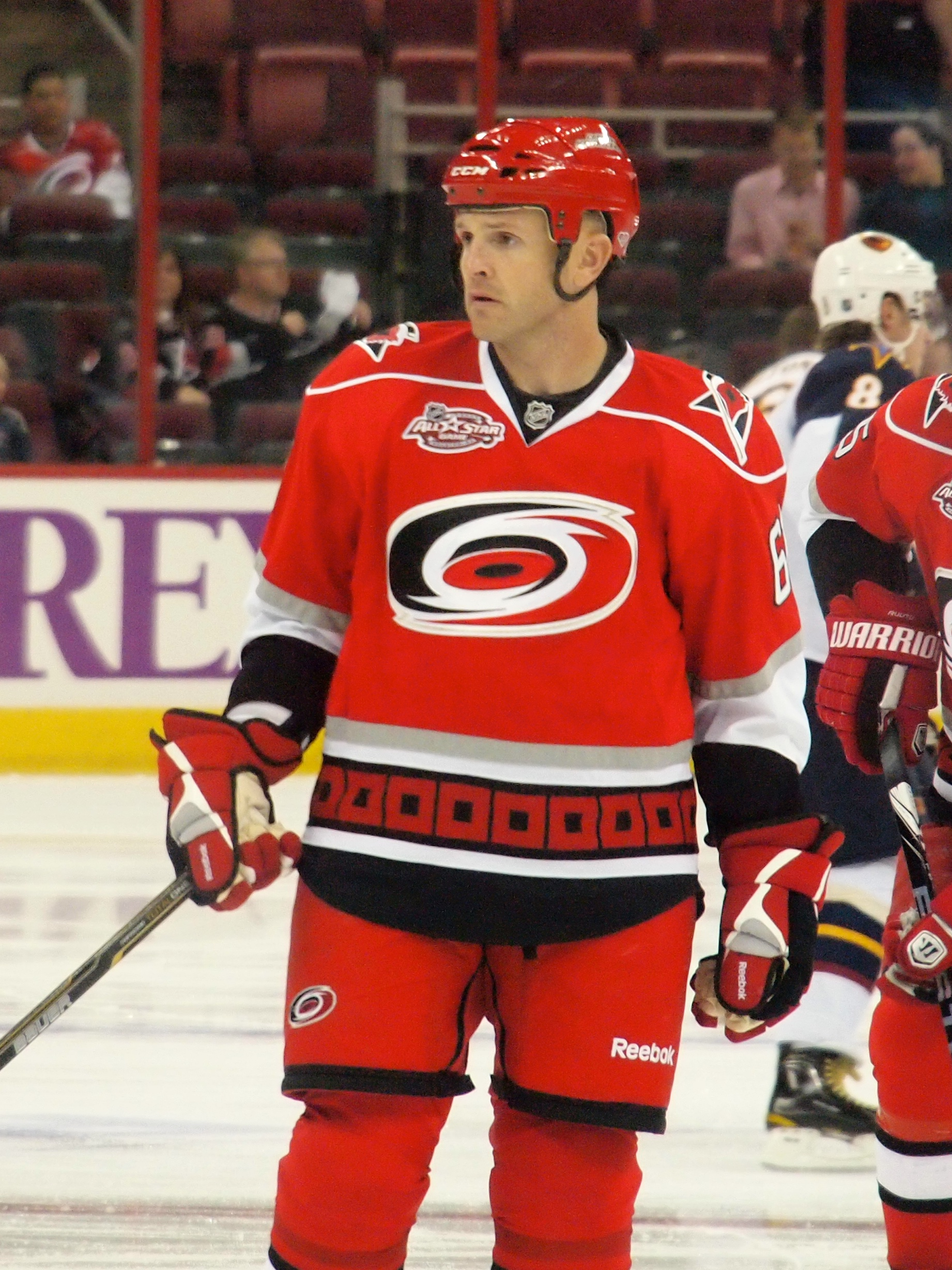
- Stillman with the Carolina Hurricanes in 2011
- Born: December 20, 1973 (age 52) Peterborough, Ontario, Canada
- Height: 6 ft 0 in (183 cm)
- Weight: 201 lb (91 kg; 14 st 5 lb)
- Position: Left wing
- Shot: Left
- Played for: Calgary Flames; St. Louis Blues; Tampa Bay Lightning; Carolina Hurricanes; Ottawa Senators; Florida Panthers
- National team: Canada
- NHL draft: 6th overall, 1992; Calgary Flames
- Playing career: 1993–2011

Cory Stillman (born December 20, 1973) is a Canadian professional ice hockey executive and former player. He played in the National Hockey League (NHL) for several teams between 1994 and 2011, winning the Stanley Cup twice. He is currently the Head Coach of the Guelph Storm.

Drafted sixth overall by the Calgary Flames in 1992, Stillman was an AHL All Star with the Flames' affiliate in Saint John in 1995. As well as the Flames, he would go on to play for the St. Louis Blues, Tampa Bay Lightning, Carolina Hurricanes, Ottawa Senators, and Florida Panthers over his 15-year NHL career, scoring over 700 points over more than 1,000 games.

Stillman won the Stanley Cup in 2004 and 2006 with the Lightning and Hurricanes, respectively. He is one of only 12 players in the NHL's history to win the Stanley Cup in back-to-back seasons with different teams (the 2004–2005 season was wiped out by a lockout).

== Playing career ==
Stillman grew up in Peterborough, Ontario playing hockey for the Minor Petes (OMHA) program. He also played competitive baseball. In 1989–90, Stillman played for the Peterborough Roadrunners Jr.B. (MTJHL) hockey club before being a second round choice (27th overall) of the Windsor Spitfires in the 1990 Ontario Hockey League Priority Selection.

=== Calgary Flames ===
Stillman started his professional career in 1992, when he was drafted sixth overall in the first round by the Calgary Flames. Stillman was tried on both wings, and was quoted saying he liked the left side better but he can play right wing easily if needed. He would play one more season in the OHL with Peterborough, scoring 25 goals and 55 assists in 61 games in 1992–93, upon which he joined the Flames organization with the Saint John Flames of the American Hockey League. Stillman excelled at this level, posting an 83-point campaign (35 goals, 48 assists) across 79 games in 1993–94. With the NHL in a lockout at the beginning of the 1994–95 season, Stillman remained in the AHL to begin the following season, and in his second season at this level, his performance level improved more, with 28 goals and 53 assists across 63 games.

Upon the end of the lockout, the 1994–95 NHL season began in earnest in January; the Flames played their first game on January 20 and, in time for their ninth game of the season on February 6, Stillman made his NHL debut. This game would turn out be a 5–4 home defeat against the Winnipeg Jets, and Stillman recorded his first NHL point on a 3rd-period assist on what was, at the time, the go-ahead goal before the Flames faltered late. He would notch another assist in his second career game, but failed to find the scoresheet in his next eight games, at which point he was reassigned to Saint John. Back at this level, the AHL Flames qualified for the postseason despite a lackluster 27–40–13 record, the #4 seed from the AHL's Atlantic Division, and were quickly dispatched in the first round by the #1 seeded Prince Edward Island Senators. Saint John's 1–0 defeat in game five on April 21 would represent Stillman's final career game at the AHL level.

Stillman became a regular in the Flames lineup beginning in 1995–96, though it would take a couple seasons for him to begin meeting expectations offensively that he had established in his minor league performances. After scoring only 22 goals and 61 points across his first two seasons, Stillman reached a new level during the 1997–98 season in Calgary, scoring 27 goals. He would match that feat again the following season, and those 27 goals would come to represent his single-season career high. Alas for Stillman, his rounding into form coincided with a downturn in fortune for the Flames. Calgary, who had qualified for the playoffs every season except one between 1976 through until 1996, would not qualify for the playoffs for the rest of his time in the organization. He only played two playoff games for the Flames in 1996, when a declining Flames team qualified as the #6 seed and were swept in the first round by the Blackhawks.

=== St. Louis Blues ===
Hampered by injury, Stillman only played 37 games in 1999-2000 and recorded 21 points. He bounced back during 2000–01 with 21 goals across 66 games before he was traded to the St. Louis Blues in an effort to bolster the Blues' roster ahead of the postseason. The Blues finished the regular season with 103 points and were the #4 seed in the Western Conference, and made it to the Western Conference Final, avenging an upset in the first round against the San Jose Sharks in the previous season as well as sweeping the Pacific Division champion Dallas Stars in the second round before losing four games to one to the eventual Cup winners in the Colorado Avalanche. For his part, Stillman chipped in three goals and five assists across 15 games, including an assist on the tying goal and then scoring the game-winning goal in overtime of game three against Dallas.

Stillman would score 23 goals the following season and another 24 in the 2002–03 season, as the Blues would make the playoffs in both seasons but failed to make deep runs as they were defeated in the second round in 2002 by the Detroit Red Wings, who also went on to win the Cup that season, and then lost in the first round in the 2003 postseason to the Vancouver Canucks in seven games, surrendering a 3–1 lead in the series along the way. Stillman only recorded two goals across 15 playoff games across those two postseasons, totaling five goals and nine assists in 30 playoff games he played with the Blues overall, an average of roughly half a point per game and below the standards he had established from his regular season performances. A pending free agent at the end of the 2003–04 season, he was traded during the off-season to the Tampa Bay Lightning for a draft pick that eventually turned out to be long-time Blues stalwart, and later captain, David Backes.

=== Tampa Bay Lightning ===
The Tampa Bay Lightning, who had been an also-ran for most of their franchise history dating back to 1992, had an unexpectedly successful season in 2002–03, going 36–25–16–5 for a 93-point season and winning their first division championship along the way. They were defeated in the second round by the New Jersey Devils and with one of their top forwards, Vaclav Prospal, slated to hit free agency, the Lightning acquired Stillman from St. Louis for a second-round pick. During the regular season, Stillman lived up to expectations and then some, as he would score 25 goals and record 80 points, a career-high, across 81 games, giving the Lightning some much needed scoring depth alongside standout forwards Martin St. Louis, Vincent Lecavalier, and Brad Richards. After their division championship of the previous season, the Lightning would exceed these levels in 2003–04, repeating as Southeast Division champions and finishing as the #1 seed in the Eastern Conference with 106 points. The Lightning would win 25 of their final 36 regular season games, with Stillman scoring 11 goals and 46 points coinciding with this spurt.

For Stillman, he and his team would take divergent paths during the postseason. After a superb regular season, he was quiet during the postseason, scoring only two goals and five assists across 21 playoff games and only finding the scoresheet once in his last eight games. Ultimately, the Lightning were able to overcome Stillman's power outage as they would win the Stanley Cup in seven games against the team that originally drafted him, the Calgary Flames, overcoming a 3–2 deficit by winning the final two games of the series.

During the 2004 NHL entry draft, the Lightning re-acquired Prospal and did not re-sign Stillman, who hit free agency on July 1, 2004. With the 2004-05 NHL lockout, it would be 16 months before Stillman, or any NHL player, would play another game in the NHL.

=== Carolina Hurricanes ===
During the free-agent signing period following the end of the 2004–05 NHL lockout, Stillman agreed to a three-year contract with the Carolina Hurricanes August 2, 2005. There, his team also won the Stanley Cup. He became the first player since Claude Lemieux to win consecutive Cups with different teams, being the eleventh overall and most recent to do so until Patrick Maroon accomplished the feat in 2020.

Stillman waived his no-trade clause February 11, 2008, so that the Hurricanes could trade him along with Mike Commodore to the Ottawa Senators for Patrick Eaves and Joe Corvo.

On July 1, 2008, Stillman signed a 3-year deal worth $10.6 million with the Florida Panthers.

On February 17, 2011, Stillman played his 1,000th NHL game against the Philadelphia Flyers at BankAtlantic Center in Sunrise, Florida.

The Florida Panthers traded Stillman back to the Carolina Hurricanes on February 24, 2011, in exchange for Ryan Carter and a fifth-round pick in the 2011 NHL entry draft.

== Executive and coaching career ==
Stillman announced his retirement after 16 seasons in the NHL on September 8, 2011. He initially joined the Florida Panthers staff as a development coach in the preceding 2011-12 season before returning to the Hurricanes the following year as the Director of Player Development and Director of Forwards Development.

Stillman remained in his role with the Hurricanes from 2012 until May 25, 2017, when the Sudbury Wolves of the Ontario Hockey League announced the hiring of Stillman as their new head coach. He led the Wolves for three seasons with a 94–89–16 record. In 2020, he was hired by the Arizona Coyotes as an assistant coach. He recently was named the head coach of the Guelph Storm in the OHL.

== Personal life ==
Stillman is married to the former Mara Stefanski. The Stillmans have three children, Riley, Madison and Chase. His son, Riley, was drafted from the OHL Oshawa Generals to the Florida Panthers in the 2016 NHL Draft as the 114th overall pick, and currently plays for the Edmonton Oilers. Chase plays for the Vancouver Canucks organisation. Prior to that, Chase played for the Peterborough Petes after being traded from the Sudbury Wolves, his father's former team.

Stillman's father-in-law is former AHL player Bud Stefanski. Stefanski was general manager and coach of the Mississauga St. Michael's Majors of the OHL from 2003 to 2007.

== Career statistics ==
=== Regular season and playoffs ===
			Regular season					Playoffs
Season	Team	League	GP	G	A	Pts	PIM	GP	G	A	Pts	PIM
1989–90	Peterborough Roadrunners	CJHL	41	30	54	84	76	—	—	—	—	—
1990–91	Windsor Spitfires	OHL	64	31	70	101	31	11	3	6	9	8
1991–92	Windsor Spitfires	OHL	53	29	61	90	59	7	2	4	6	8
1992–93	Peterborough Petes	OHL	61	25	55	80	55	18	3	8	11	18
1992–93	Canadian National Team	Intl	1	0	0	0	0	—	—	—	—	—
1993–94	Saint John Flames	AHL	79	35	48	83	52	7	2	4	6	16
1994–95	Saint John Flames	AHL	63	28	53	81	70	5	0	2	2	2
1994–95	Calgary Flames	NHL	10	0	2	2	2	—	—	—	—	—
1995–96	Calgary Flames	NHL	74	16	19	35	41	2	1	1	2	0
1996–97	Calgary Flames	NHL	58	6	20	26	14	—	—	—	—	—
1997–98	Calgary Flames	NHL	72	27	22	49	40	—	—	—	—	—
1998–99	Calgary Flames	NHL	76	27	30	57	38	—	—	—	—	—
1999–00	Calgary Flames	NHL	37	12	9	21	12	—	—	—	—	—
2000–01	Calgary Flames	NHL	66	21	24	45	45	—	—	—	—	—
2000–01	St. Louis Blues	NHL	12	3	4	7	6	15	3	5	8	8
2001–02	St. Louis Blues	NHL	80	23	22	45	36	9	0	2	2	2
2002–03	St. Louis Blues	NHL	79	24	43	67	56	6	2	2	4	2
2003–04	Tampa Bay Lightning	NHL	81	25	55	80	36	21	2	5	7	15
2005–06	Carolina Hurricanes	NHL	72	21	55	76	32	25	9	17	26	12
2006–07	Carolina Hurricanes	NHL	43	5	22	27	24	—	—	—	—	—
2007–08	Carolina Hurricanes	NHL	55	21	25	46	14	—	—	—	—	—
2007–08	Ottawa Senators	NHL	24	3	16	19	10	4	2	0	2	2
2008–09	Florida Panthers	NHL	63	17	32	49	37	—	—	—	—	—
2009–10	Florida Panthers	NHL	58	15	22	37	22	—	—	—	—	—
2010–11	Florida Panthers	NHL	44	7	16	23	20	—	—	—	—	—
2010–11	Carolina Hurricanes	NHL	21	5	11	16	4	—	—	—	—	—
NHL totals			1,025	278	449	727	489	82	19	32	51	43

=== International ===
Year	Team	Event	Result	GP	G	A	Pts	PIM
1999	Canada	WC	4th	10	4	4	8	14
Senior totals				10	4	4	8	14

== Coaching record ==
=== Ontario Hockey League ===
Team	Year	Regular season						Postseason					
Team	Year	G	W	L	OTL	Pts	Finish	Result					
Sudbury	2017–18	68	17	42	9	43	5th in Central	Missed playoffs					
68	43	20	5	91	2nd in Central	Won in conference quarter-finals (4-0 vs. MIS); Lost in conference semi-finals (0-4 vs. OTT)	68	43	20	5	91	second in Central	Won in conference quarter-finals (4-0 vs. MIS); Lost in conference semi-finals (0-4 vs. OTT)
Sudbury	2019–20	63	34	27	2	70	1st in Central	Playoffs cancelled					
Guelph	2024–25	68	21	38	9	51	5th in Midwest	Missed playoffs					
Guelph	2025–26	68	28	35	5	63	4th in Midwest	Lost in conference quarter-finals (0-4 vs. WSR)					
OHL totals	2017–2026	335	143	162	30	316	1 Division Title	4-8 (0.333)					

== Awards and honours ==
Award	Year
OHL
Emms Family Award (Rookie of the Year)	1991
AHL
All-Star Game	1995
NHL
Stanley Cup (Tampa Bay Lightning)	2004
Stanley Cup (Carolina Hurricanes)	2006

Awards and achievements
Preceded by Niklas Sundblad	Calgary Flames' first-round draft pick 1992	Succeeded by Jesper Mattsson
