= Matt Cullen =

American ice hockey player (born 1976)

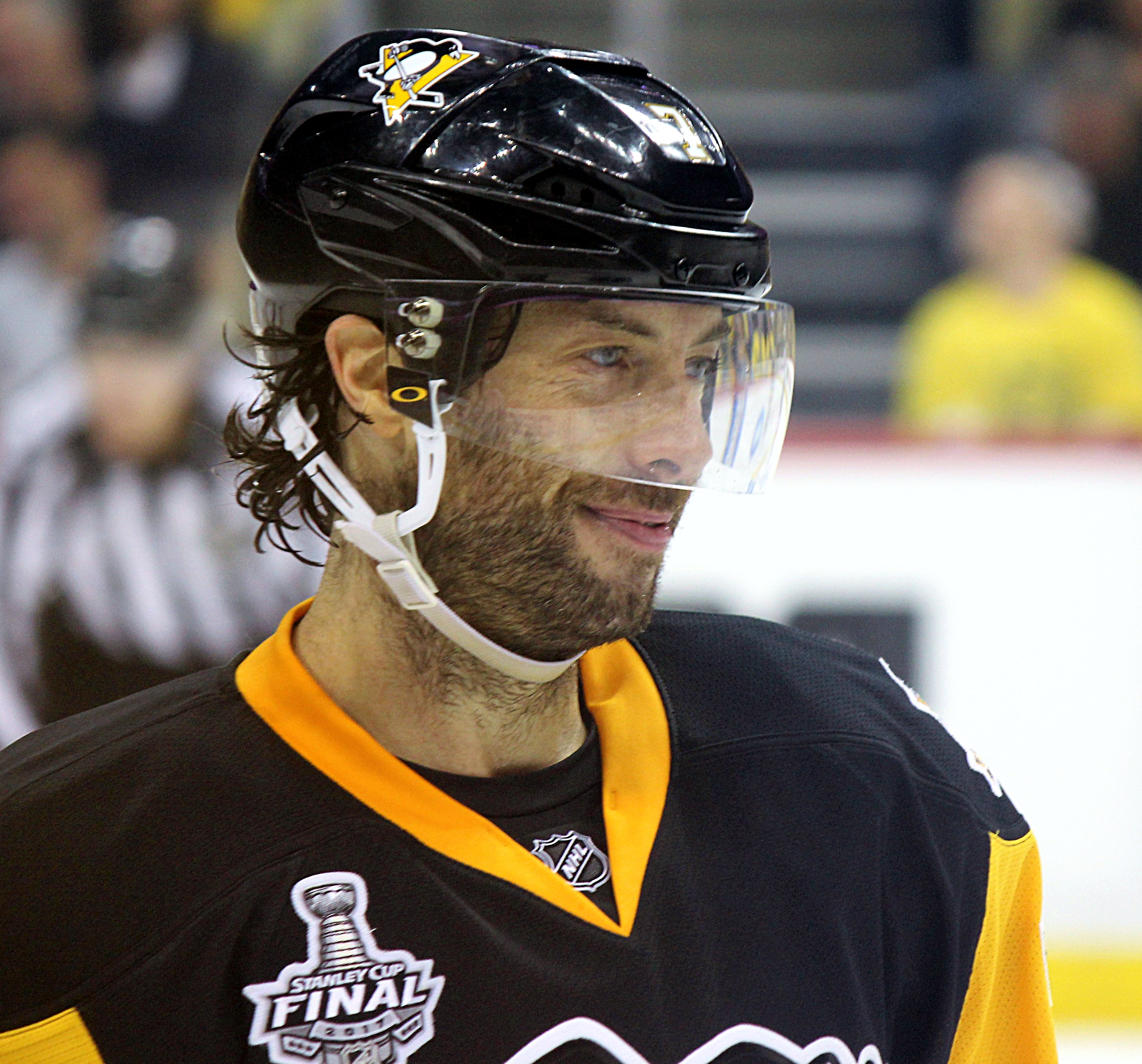
- Cullen with the Pittsburgh Penguins during the 2017 Stanley Cup Final
- Born: November 2, 1976 (age 50) Virginia, Minnesota, U.S.
- Height: 6 ft 1 in (185 cm)
- Weight: 202 lb (92 kg; 14 st 6 lb)
- Position: Center
- Shot: Left
- Played for: Mighty Ducks of Anaheim; Florida Panthers; SG Cortina; Carolina Hurricanes; New York Rangers; Ottawa Senators; Minnesota Wild; Nashville Predators; Pittsburgh Penguins
- National team: United States
- NHL draft: 35th overall, 1996; Mighty Ducks of Anaheim
- Playing career: 1997–2019

Matthew David Cullen (born November 2, 1976) is an American former professional ice hockey center who played 21 seasons in the National Hockey League (NHL). Cullen won the Stanley Cup three times during his career, with the Carolina Hurricanes in 2006 and the Pittsburgh Penguins in 2016 and 2017, and won a bronze medal at the 2004 World Championship with the United States.

As of 2025, Cullen is one of 22 players to play over 1,500 NHL games and the only one of the group to never be named an All-Star. He is also one of three American-born players to play in at least 1,500 NHL games.

== Early life ==
Cullen was born on November 2, 1976, in Virginia, Minnesota, to parents Terry and Nancy Cullen. He grew up in Moorhead, Minnesota alongside his siblings Mark, Joe, and Annie.

== Playing career ==
=== Amateur ===
Cullen and his family moved to Moorhead, Minnesota when he was 10 years old after his father accepted a position coaching ice hockey at Moorhead High School. Upon reaching high school age, Cullen played one more season of bantam hockey (U15) before joining the Moorhead High Spuds hockey team in 1992 under his father's tutelage. While he was reunited with his former Bantam teammates Ryan Kraft and Josh Arnold, the three never played on the same line together. In his first season with the Spuds, Cullen ranked fourth on the team in scoring with 15 goals and 26 assists for 41 points. The Minnesota State High School League recognised Cullen's efforts in March and he was named to their 12-member all-tournament team. During the three-day tournament, he scored four assists. Cullen centred the second line between Ryan Frisch and Ryan Kortan in his second year with the Spuds.

In his senior year, Cullen set Moorhead High School single-season records in both ice hockey and baseball. As a shortstop, he tied the school's home run record set in 1991 by hitting three in one game. During the 1994–95 hockey season, Cullen centred the Spuds top line between Frisch and Troy Bagne. He passed Kraft's single-season points record on March 9 by tallying a goal and an assist within 63 seconds of each other. He was subsequently named the Associated Press' Player of the Year and was selected for the All-State First Team. While Cullen's outstanding play earned him a nomination for the 1995 Minnesota Mr. Hockey Award, he lost to Erik Rasmussen.

Throughout the regular season, Cullen was recruited by numerous local schools including the University of Minnesota, St. Cloud State University (SCSU), University of Minnesota-Duluth, University of North Dakota, and University of Wisconsin. However, NCAA rules only allowed him to accept five school visits. After being put off by the Minnesota Golden Gophers recruiting tactics and the distance between home and Wisconsin, Cullen narrowed his choices to three teams. At the start of February, Cullen announced that he planned to sign a letter of intent with St. Cloud State in April 1995. He chose St. Cloud State partly because he believed he would have a better chance of earning playing time compared to other schools.

=== Collegiate ===
Cullen played for the St. Cloud State University Huskies from 1995 to 1997 before turning professional. Before beginning his freshman season, Cullen worked with strength and conditioning coach Jack Blatherwick to improve his skating. He started the season with three goals and eight assists in five games and ended the month of October with 11 points. Despite experiencing a lengthy scoring drought through November, he still ranked third on the team in scoring by the end of the month. He broke his 14-game scoring drought on December 10 to help lead the Huskies over Michigan Tech. In late December, Cullen and his teammate Mark Parrish represented Team USA's national junior team at the 1996 World Junior Ice Hockey Championships. He scored three goals and one assist over six games as Team USA placed fifth and failed to medal. Cullen finished his freshman season leading the team with 29 assists and 41 points. He was subsequently named to the WCHA's All-Rookie team and was selected as the Huskies Most Outstanding Freshman. Following his freshman season, Cullen was drafted in the second round, 35th overall, by the Mighty Ducks of Anaheim in the 1996 NHL entry draft. However, he was expected to return to the Huskies for his sophomore season.

Despite playing in fewer games as a sophomore, Cullen beat his rookie season totals and finished with 15 goals and 30 assists. Before the 1996–97 season began, Cullen stated that he felt more confident managing the puck and was more patient with his passing attempts. By the start of November, Cullen had maintained a six-game point streak and recorded his first collegiate hat-trick on November 9. However, that night he began suffering from a respiratory illness in his kidney that caused him to lose 20 pounds and become jaundiced. While he returned to his home in Moorhead to properly recover he was also struck with strep throat. At the time of the illness, Cullen led the Huskies with 13 points. After being cleared to play, Cullen scored two points in his first game back on December 6 against Northern Michigan. He quickly accumulated five goals and 10 assists over his next 10 games before beginning a lengthy scoring slump. From December 20 to January 29, Cullen was held to two power-play goals and five assists. After rejecting the Ducks' original contract offer, Cullen signed a three-year two-way $1.435 contract with the team on March 28, 1997. The contract was also equipped with a $310,000 signing bonus and other incentive bonuses if he first made the Ducks' NHL roster.

=== Professional ===
==== Anaheim Ducks ====
After signing his entry-level contract, Cullen was assigned to the Ducks' American Hockey League (AHL) affiliate, the Baltimore Bandits, for the remainder of the 1996–97 season. He scored his first AHL point, an assist, in his debut with the Bandits on April 8. He scored his first AHL goal on April 11, against the Philadelphia Phantoms, to help the Bandits secure a spot in the 1997 Calder Cup playoffs. His second goal of the season, and first ever overtime goal, came the following night also against the Phantoms. Through the Bandit's final six game of the regular season, Cullen tallied three goals and three assists for six points. He also tallied two assists in the Bandits' semifinal series against the Phantoms before they were eliminated.

Cullen spent the majority of the Ducks' 1997 training camp playing alongside their star players Paul Kariya and Teemu Selanne. He scored two points over three exhibition games before missing the fourth one due to a knee injury. As a result of his impressive play during training camp and the preseason, the Ducks coaching staff chose to keep him at the NHL level once camp ended. Despite not being cut, Cullen was made aware that he would be reassigned to the AHL if he was unable to earn regular playing time on the top three lines. While he was expected to make his NHL debut with the Ducks in their season-opening game in Japan, Cullen was reassigned to the AHL without playing a game for the team. Through his first five games with the Cincinnati Mighty Ducks, Cullen tallied one goal and four assists for five points. He was called up to the NHL level on October 28, 1997, and made his NHL debut that night against the Toronto Maple Leafs. He stayed with the team afterwards and recorded his first NHL point, an assist, on November 2 against the Boston Bruins. By mid-November, he had become a mainstay on the Ducks top line with Selanne and tallied five assists through seven games. He scored eight assists through 27 games before being reassigned to the AHL on January 5, 1998. He swiftly recorded five goals over his first three games back to help the Cincinnati Mighty Ducks maintain a season-high three-game win streak. By mid-January, Cullen held a multi-game point streak of seven games, during which he recorded 11 goals and six assists. He was recalled to the NHL level on January 20 and scored his first NHL goal the following night against the Florida Panthers. Despite not finishing the month of January in the AHL, Cullen was recognized as the AHL's Player of the Month.

When the NHL paused the season so players could participate in the 1998 Winter Olympics, Cullen was reassigned to the AHL. He scored nine goals over his 10-game stint with the Cincinnati Mighty Ducks and was selected for the AHL All-Star Classic. Once the Olympics concluded, Cullen rejoined the Mighty Ducks of Anaheim. Through his next 27 games, Cullen accumulated five goals and 10 assists. He finished his rookie season ranking in the top 10 among all NHL rookies with six goals and 21 assists for 27 points. His points total was also the second most by a rookie in franchise history. After ending his rookie season, Cullen was named to Team USA's 1998 IIHF World Championship roster.

As part of his offseason training regimen, Cullen reduced his fat intake and lowered his body fat to 6.7%. He also worked out with his brothers Mark and Joe, which included cardio and weightlifting. The Ducks' newest head coach, Craig Hartsburg, described Cullen as their "best young prospect." He was subsequently named to the Ducks' opening night roster for the 1998–99 season, but remained on their fourth line as he struggled to match his previous season's success. He experienced a lengthy scoring drought at the end of October that was snapped at 11 games with an assist. As his struggles continued, Cullen was reassigned to the Cincinnati Mighty Ducks to build back his confidence. At the time of his demotion, Cullen had one assist through 17 games and was playing only on the Ducks' third and fourth lines. Cullen recorded one goal and two assists over his three-game stint in the AHL, and suffered from a broken nose due to a high stick. Despite this, he immediately tallied two assists in his first game back at the NHL level to help the Ducks end their three-game losing streak. He added two more points over his next two games, including his first goal of the season.

As a restricted free agent, the Ducks made Cullen a qualifying offer of a one-year $440,000 contract over the summer. While he was unhappy with this contract, he was unable to request arbitration due to his short tenure in the league. Cullen eventually signed a contract with the Ducks a few days before their training camp opened, but the terms were not publicly disclosed. While Cullen was named to Team USA's 2001 IIHF World Championship roster, he was forced to pull out as he had yet to recover from his wrist surgery.

==== Florida Panthers ====
At the end of January 2003, Cullen and Pavel Trnka were traded to the Florida Panthers in exchange for Sandis Ozolinsh and Lance Ward.

==== Carolina Hurricanes and New York Rangers ====
Before the start of the 2004–05 season, Cullen signed a one-year contract with the Carolina Hurricanes as a free agent. However, he was unable to play for the Hurricanes that season due to the 2004–05 NHL lockout. Instead, he signed a contract with SG Cortina of the Italian Hockey League Serie A. As a non-profit team, SG Cortina's home arena was the Stadio olimpico del ghiaccio and Cullen's monthly salary was $7,930. He ended the season leading the league in scoring with 27 goals and 33 assists for 60 points through 36 games. He later credited his time with SG Cortina for improving his confidence on the ice. As Serie A played fewer games in a season than the NHL, Cullen was able to develop his overall skills. His efforts helped lead SG Cortina to the Serie A championship playoffs but they failed to secure a championship title. Once the playoffs concluded, Cullen joined Team USA for the 2005 IIHF World Championship. He tallied five points in two exhibition games before tearing his medial collateral ligament. Due to this injury, he was replaced on Team USA's roster by Zach Parise.

Once he returned to North America, Cullen re-signed with the Hurricanes on August 8, 2005, for the 2005–06 season. While he was invited to Team USA's Olympic orientation camp, he was ultimately not chosen for the final team. Cullen began the season by scoring six goals and three assists through the Hurricanes first nine games. However, he soon began to struggle and went 19 games without a goal through November and December. After breaking this streak on December 13, Cullen quickly accumulated 20 goals before suffering a broken jaw on January 26, 2006. While he did not make Team USA's main roster, he was selected for their 'Taxi squad' as a possible replacement for any injured players. As such, he travelled with Team USA to Italy for the entirety of the 2006 Winter Olympic Games. Cullen went goalless through his first 10 games back from his jaw injury, but snapped the streak on March 11. He ended the regular season with a career-high 25 goals and 49 points through 78 games.

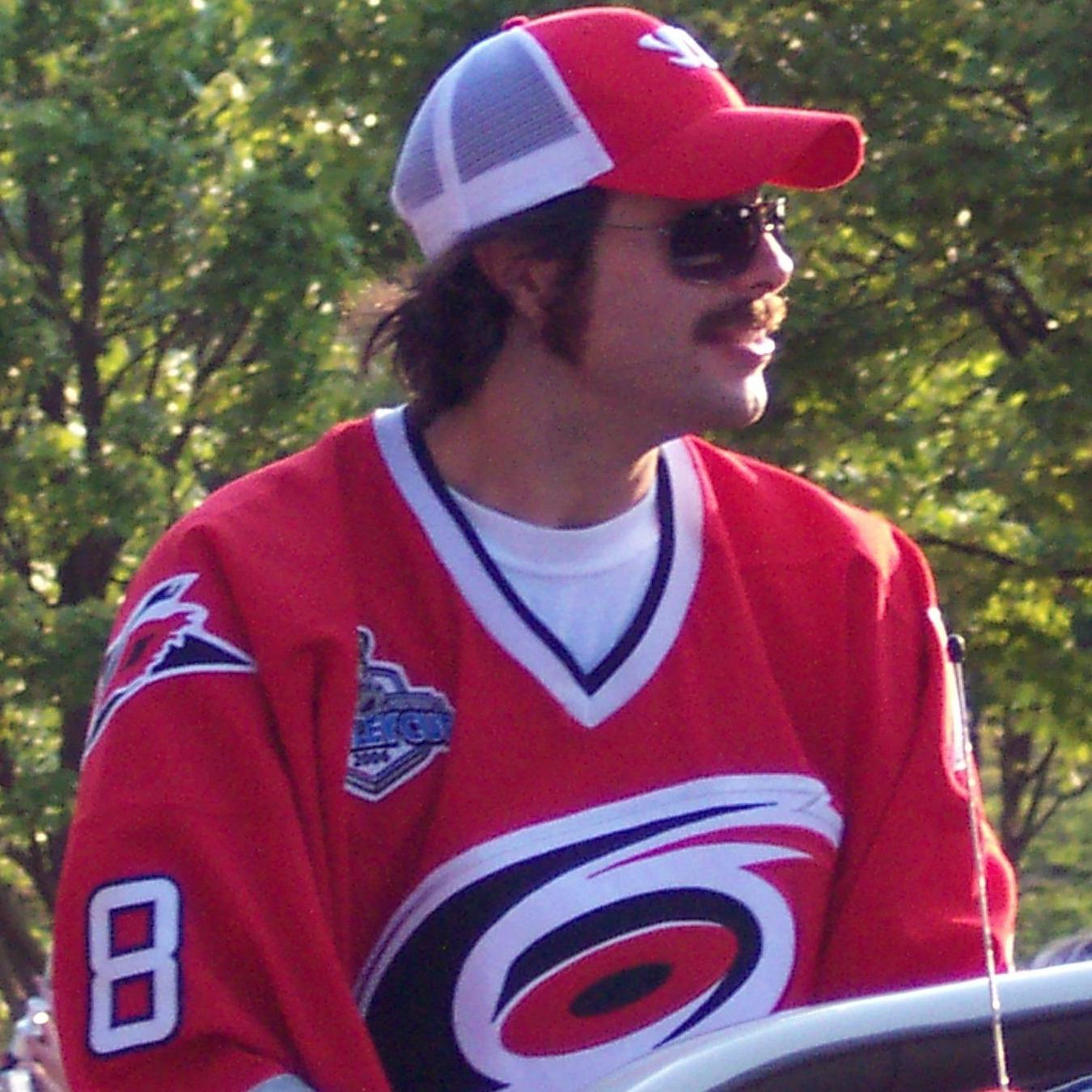
Cullen at the Hurricanes Stanley Cup parade.

As the Hurricanes qualified for the 2006 Stanley Cup playoffs, they faced off against the Montreal Canadiens in the Eastern Conference quarterfinals. Cullen scored his first playoff goal in game one of their series and added a second goal and an assist in game two. Cullen scored his third goal of the series in Game 5 to help give the Hurricanes a 2–1 win. Despite losing the first two games, the Hurricanes won the next four to clinch the series and advance to the Eastern Conference semifinals against the New Jersey Devils. Cullen tallied an assist in Game 1 and ended the six-game series against New Jersey with four points. The Hurricanes then advanced to the Eastern Conference final against the Buffalo Sabres. After losing Game 1, Cullen tallied two assists in Game 2 to help the Hurricanes tie the series 1-1. The assists pushed into fourth place on the team in scoring. He then tallied two assists in game five and another assist in game six to help the Hurricanes advance to the 2006 Stanley Cup Final. After going goalless through four games, Cullen assisted on two goals in Game 7 to help the Hurricanes clinch their first Stanley Cup in franchise history. He finished the playoffs with four goals and 14 assists for 18 points through 25 games.

After the season ended, Cullen became an unrestricted free agent. He subsequently signed a four-year, $11.2 million contract with the New York Rangers. He scored a goal in game four of the Rangers' first-round series against the Atlanta Thrashers to help them advance to the second round. After one season with the Rangers, Cullen was traded back to the Hurricanes in exchange for Andrew Hutchinson, Joe Barnes, and a third-round draft pick in 2008.

On February 22, 2009, Cullen scored the first NHL hat-trick in a game against the Colorado Avalanche.

==== Ottawa Senators and first stint with the Minnesota Wild ====
On February 12, 2010, Cullen was traded to the Ottawa Senators in exchange for Alexandre R. Picard and a 2010 second-round draft pick.

On July 1, 2010, Cullen signed a three-year $10.5 million contract with the Minnesota Wild as a free agent.

==== Nashville Predators ====
Upon the expiration of his three-year contract with the Wild, and with the team facing salary cap constraints, Cullen departed as a free agent and signed a two-year contract with the Nashville Predators on July 5, 2013.

==== Pittsburgh Penguins ====
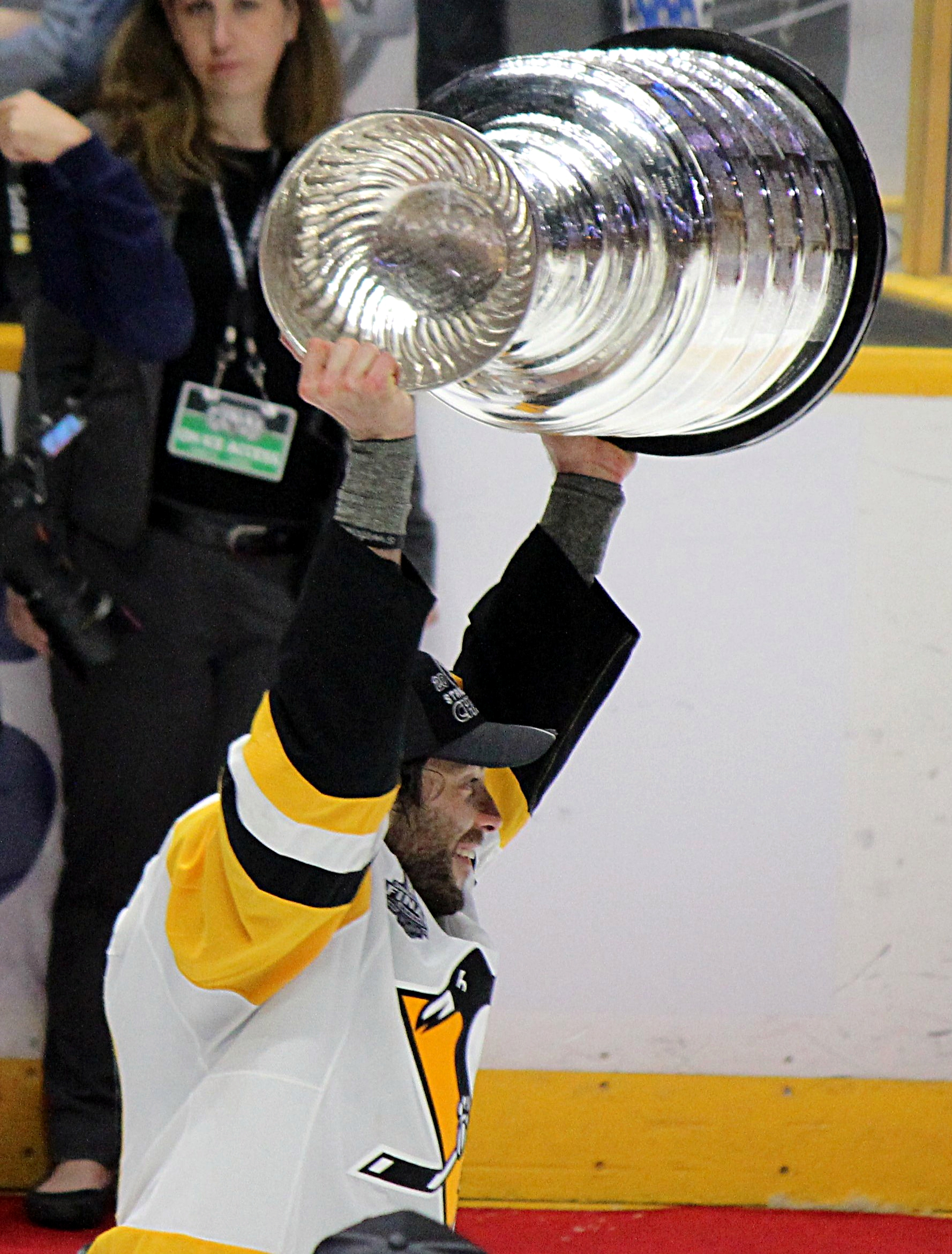
Cullen raising the Stanley Cup in Nashville, 2017.

On August 6, 2015, Cullen signed a one-year deal with the Pittsburgh Penguins, reuniting him with former Hurricanes' general manager Jim Rutherford, with whom he won a Stanley Cup in 2006. Cullen won his second Stanley Cup when the Penguins defeated the San Jose Sharks in six games in the 2016 Stanley Cup Final. On August 17, 2016, Cullen signed a second one-year deal with the Penguins. In June 2017, Cullen won his second consecutive Stanley Cup with the Penguins when they defeated the Nashville Predators in six games in the Stanley Cup Final.

==== Return to Minnesota ====
On August 16, 2017, after winning back-to-back Stanley Cup championships with the Penguins, Cullen signed a one-year contract to return to the Minnesota Wild. After Jaromír Jágr was placed on waivers by the Calgary Flames that season, Cullen became the oldest active player in the NHL at 41.

==== Second stint with the Penguins and retirement ====
On July 1, 2018, Cullen returned to the Penguins, signing a one-year contract.

On July 10, 2019, after completing 21 seasons in the NHL, Cullen announced his retirement. Upon his retirement, Cullen was one of two American-born NHL players to play in at least 1,500 games.

== International play ==
Cullen also played on four World Championship teams and was a 2004 bronze medalist with the United States national team.

== Post-retirement ==
After retiring from the NHL in 2019, Cullen became a player development coach for the Pittsburgh Penguins. He saw his first action as an NHL bench coach in February 2022, when filling in for the injured Todd Reirden.

In 2023, Cullen was inducted to St. Cloud State University's athletics hall of fame. In 2024, Cullen was elected to the United States Hockey Hall of Fame.

In 2025, Cullen returned to his alma mater, Moorhead High School, to become an assistant coach of the boys' hockey team. The team featured Cullen's son and nephew, and they reached the Class AA state Championship his first season as coach. Cullen helped coached the Moorhead Spuds to the Minnesota AA championship victory vs the Stillwater Ponies to a 7–6 win at the Xcel Energy Center on March 8, 2025.

In April 2026, Cullen was hired as the Director of Player Development for the University of Minnesota Golden Gophers men's hockey team.

== Personal life ==
Cullen and his wife have three sons, and they reside in Moorhead, Minnesota, during the off-season. Their son Wyatt was drafted by the Nashville Predators in 2026. Cullen is a Christian.

Cullen founded the "Cullen Children's Foundation", also known as "Cully's Kids", in 2003 after his brother Mark underwent surgery to remove a cancerous mole. The foundation provides financial resources to organizations that support children's healthcare needs with an emphasis on cancer.

In 2018, Cullen donated to the Moorhead Youth Hockey Center, and renamed the hockey center to the Cullen Hockey Center.

In 2020, Cullen bought in on the Fargo Force Hockey Academy and changed the name to the Cullen Force Academy upon his buy in.

== Career statistics ==
=== Regular season and playoffs ===
			Regular season					Playoffs
Season	Team	League	GP	G	A	Pts	PIM	GP	G	A	Pts	PIM
1994–95	Moorhead High School	USHS	28	47	42	89	78	—	—	—	—	—
1995–96	St. Cloud State University	WCHA	39	12	29	41	28	—	—	—	—	—
1996–97	St. Cloud State University	WCHA	36	15	30	45	70	—	—	—	—	—
1996–97	Baltimore Bandits	AHL	6	3	3	6	7	3	0	2	2	0
1997–98	Cincinnati Mighty Ducks	AHL	18	15	12	27	2	—	—	—	—	—
1997–98	Mighty Ducks of Anaheim	NHL	61	6	21	27	23	—	—	—	—	—
1998–99	Cincinnati Mighty Ducks	AHL	3	1	2	3	8	—	—	—	—	—
1998–99	Mighty Ducks of Anaheim	NHL	75	11	14	25	47	4	0	0	0	0
1999–2000	Mighty Ducks of Anaheim	NHL	80	13	26	39	24	—	—	—	—	—
2000–01	Mighty Ducks of Anaheim	NHL	82	10	30	40	38	—	—	—	—	—
2001–02	Mighty Ducks of Anaheim	NHL	79	18	30	48	24	—	—	—	—	—
2002–03	Mighty Ducks of Anaheim	NHL	50	7	14	21	12	—	—	—	—	—
2002–03	Florida Panthers	NHL	30	6	6	12	22	—	—	—	—	—
2003–04	Florida Panthers	NHL	56	6	13	19	24	—	—	—	—	—
2004–05	SG Cortina	ITA	36	27	34	61	58	18	8	13	21	36
2005–06	Carolina Hurricanes	NHL	78	25	24	49	40	25	4	14	18	12
2006–07	New York Rangers	NHL	80	16	25	41	52	10	1	3	4	6
2007–08	Carolina Hurricanes	NHL	59	13	36	49	32	—	—	—	—	—
2008–09	Carolina Hurricanes	NHL	69	22	21	43	20	18	3	3	6	14
2009–10	Carolina Hurricanes	NHL	60	12	28	40	26	—	—	—	—	—
2009–10	Ottawa Senators	NHL	21	4	4	8	8	6	3	5	8	0
2010–11	Minnesota Wild	NHL	78	12	27	39	34	—	—	—	—	—
2011–12	Minnesota Wild	NHL	73	14	21	35	24	—	—	—	—	—
2012–13	Minnesota Wild	NHL	42	7	20	27	10	5	0	3	3	2
2013–14	Nashville Predators	NHL	77	10	29	39	32	—	—	—	—	—
2014–15	Nashville Predators	NHL	62	7	18	25	16	6	1	1	2	4
2015–16	Pittsburgh Penguins	NHL	81	16	16	32	20	24	4	2	6	8
2016–17	Pittsburgh Penguins	NHL	72	13	18	31	30	25	2	7	9	24
2017–18	Minnesota Wild	NHL	79	11	11	22	20	5	1	1	2	2
2018–19	Pittsburgh Penguins	NHL	71	7	13	20	14	4	0	0	0	0
NHL totals			1,516	266	465	731	592	132	19	39	58	72

=== International ===
Medal record

Representing United States

World Championships
Bronze medal – third place	2004 Prague	

Year	Team	Event	Result	GP	G	A	Pts	PIM
1996	United States	WJC	5th	6	3	1	4	0
1998	United States	WC	12th	6	2	1	3	4
1999	United States	WC	6th	6	1	6	7	4
2003	United States	WC	13th	6	1	1	2	2
2004	United States	WC	3rd place, bronze medalist(s)	9	2	4	6	4
Junior totals				6	3	1	4	0
Senior totals				27	6	12	18	14

== Awards and honors ==
Award	Year	Ref
College
All-WCHA Rookie Team	1996	
All-WCHA Second Team	1997	
NHL
Stanley Cup champion	2006, 2016, 2017	

== See also ==
- List of NHL players with 1,000 games played
