= František Kaberle =

Czech ice hockey player (born 1973)

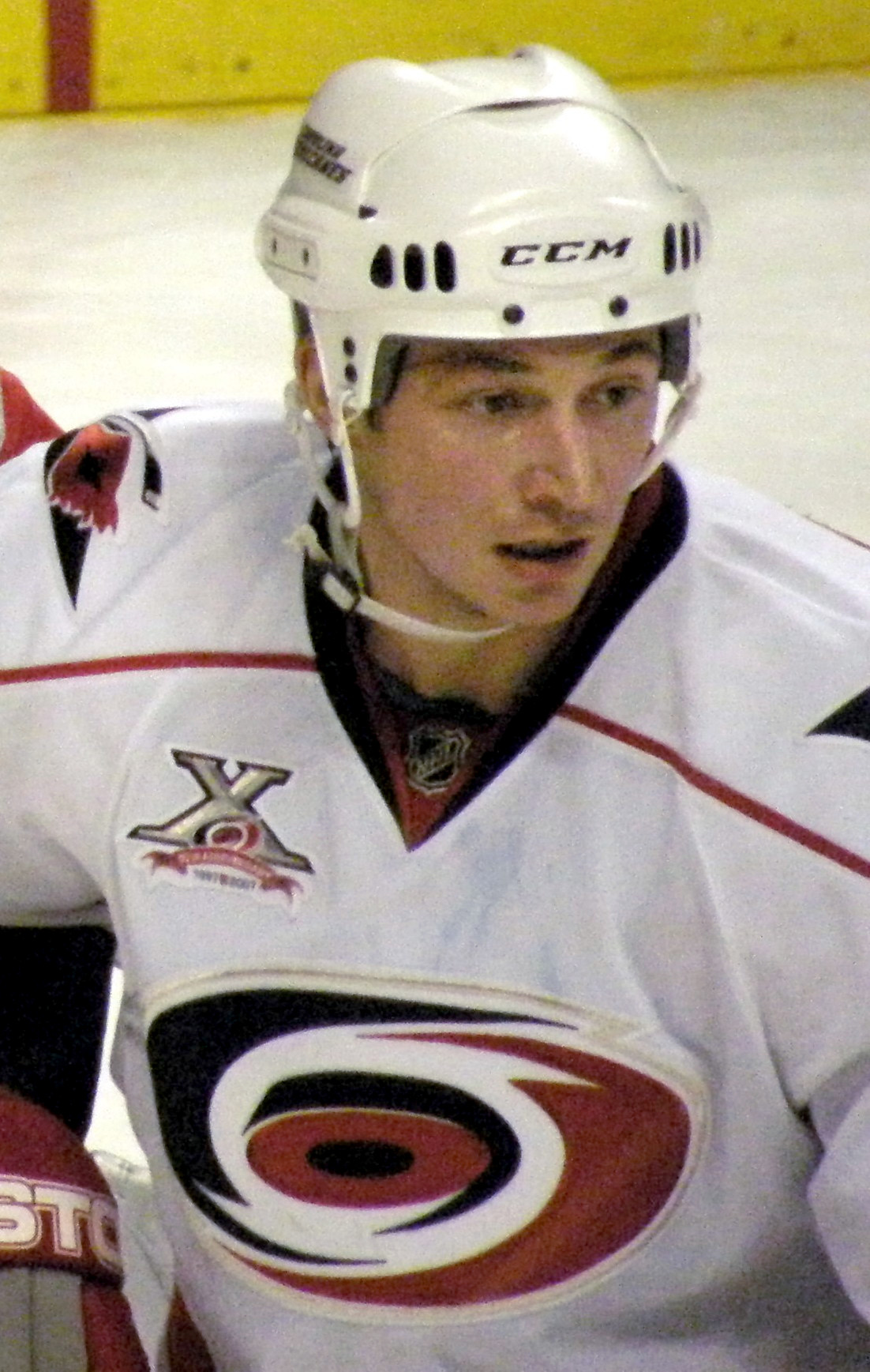
- Kaberle with the Carolina Hurricanes in 2008
- Born: November 8, 1973 (age 52) Kladno, Czechoslovakia
- Height: 6 ft 1 in (185 cm)
- Weight: 190 lb (86 kg; 13 st 8 lb)
- Position: Defence
- Shot: Left
- Played for: HC Kladno; Modo Hockey; Los Angeles Kings; Atlanta Thrashers; Carolina Hurricanes; HC Pardubice; HC Plzeň
- National team: Czechoslovakia and Czech Republic
- NHL draft: 76th overall, 1999; Los Angeles Kings
- Playing career: 1991–2012

František "Frank" Kaberle (Czech pronunciation: [ˈfrancɪʃɛk ˈkabɛrlɛ]; born November 8, 1973) is a Czech former professional ice hockey player. Playing as a defenceman, his career extended over 20 seasons, most notably in the National Hockey League (NHL) with the Los Angeles Kings, Atlanta Thrashers, and Carolina Hurricanes.

== Playing career ==
Kaberle was drafted 76th overall in the 1999 NHL entry draft by the Kings. During the 1999–2000 season, he was traded to the Atlanta Thrashers for whom he would score his first career NHL goal on April 8, 2000, against Artūrs Irbe and the Carolina Hurricanes in a 4-3 Thrashers loss. Coincidentally, after the 2004-05 lockout, Kaberle would sign with Carolina.

In the 2006 Stanley Cup Final, Kaberle scored a power play goal in the second period of game seven against the Edmonton Oilers, which would turn out to be the game and Stanley Cup winning goal. It would mark Kaberle's only Stanley Cup championship.

During the off-season before the 2006–07 season, Kaberle suffered a shoulder injury, and was placed on the injured reserve on September 13, 2006. He was removed from the injured reserve on February 6, 2007, and scored the game winner that same night.

After four seasons with the Hurricanes, Kaberle was declared a free agent after he was bought out his final year of his contract on July 28, 2009. With his North American career at a close, he returned to his native Czech Republic and re-joined his original club, HC Kladno, for the 2009–10 season.

Kaberle played two more seasons in the Czech Extraliga with HC Pardubice and HC Plzeň before concluding his professional career after the 2011–12 season.

== International play ==
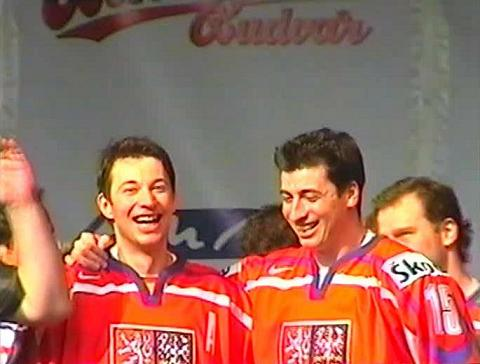
- František (left) with his brother Tomáš in 2005

Medal record

Men's ice hockey

Representing the Czech Republic

Winter Olympics
| Bronze medal – third place | 2006 Turin | |

World Championships
| Gold medal – first place | 1996 Vienna | |
| Gold medal – first place | 1999 Norway | |
| Gold medal – first place | 2000 Russia | |
| Gold medal – first place | 2001 Germany | |
| Gold medal – first place | 2005 Vienna | |
| Bronze medal – third place | 1998 Switzerland | |

Representing Czechoslovakia

World Junior Championships
| Bronze medal – third place | 1993 Sweden | |

European Junior Championships
| Gold medal – first place | 1991 Czechoslovakia | |

František Kaberle won the Ice Hockey World Championships five times: in 1996, 1999, 2000, 2001 and 2005. In 2006, he won the bronze medal at the Olympic Games in Turin. That same year, he would become the third player (first and second were Igor Larionov and Pavel Datsyuk in 2002) to win both bronze medal and Stanley Cup.

== Personal life ==
František Kaberle married his wife Kateřina on May 30, 1998. They have two daughters named Francesca and Vanessa.

His brother Tomáš Kaberle is a former NHL and Czech Extraliga player and is also a fellow Stanley Cup champion with the Boston Bruins in 2011. Both of the Kaberle brothers were named to the Czech national ice hockey team for the 2006 Winter Olympics, winning bronze.

His father František Kaberle, Sr. used to play for the Czechoslovak national ice hockey team as well.

== Career statistics ==
=== Regular season and playoffs ===
| | | | Regular season | | | | | Playoffs |
| Season | Team | League | GP | G | A | Pts | PIM | GP | G | A | Pts | PIM |
|---|---|---|---|---|---|---|---|---|---|---|---|---|
| 1988–89 | Poldi SONP Kladno | TCH Jr | 28 | 9 | 12 | 21 | 4 | — | — | — | — | — |
| 1990–91 | Poldi SONP Kladno | TCH Jr | 37 | 6 | 14 | 20 | — | — | — | — | — | — |
| 1991–92 | Poldi SONP Kladno | TCH | 45 | 1 | 5 | 6 | 8 | — | — | — | — | — |
| 1992–93 | Poldi SONP Kladno | TCH | 40 | 4 | 7 | 11 | 12 | — | — | — | — | — |
| 1993–94 | Poldi SONP Kladno | ELH | 41 | 4 | 16 | 20 | 8 | 11 | 1 | 1 | 2 | 2 |
| 1994–95 | Poldi SONP Kladno | ELH | 40 | 7 | 17 | 24 | 20 | 8 | 0 | 3 | 3 | 14 |
| 1995–96 | Modo Hockey | SEL | 40 | 5 | 7 | 12 | 34 | 8 | 0 | 1 | 1 | 0 |
| 1996–97 | Modo Hockey | SEL | 50 | 3 | 11 | 14 | 28 | — | — | — | — | — |
| 1997–98 | Modo Hockey | SEL | 46 | 5 | 4 | 9 | 22 | 9 | 1 | 1 | 2 | 4 |
| 1998–99 | Modo Hockey | SEL | 45 | 15 | 18 | 33 | 4 | 13 | 2 | 5 | 7 | 8 |
| 1999–2000 | Los Angeles Kings | NHL | 37 | 0 | 9 | 9 | 4 | — | — | — | — | — |
| 1999–2000 | Lowell Lock Monsters | AHL | 4 | 0 | 2 | 2 | 0 | — | — | — | — | — |
| 1999–2000 | Long Beach Ice Dogs | IHL | 18 | 2 | 8 | 10 | 8 | — | — | — | — | — |
| 1999–2000 | Atlanta Thrashers | NHL | 14 | 1 | 6 | 7 | 6 | — | — | — | — | — |
| 2000–01 | Atlanta Thrashers | NHL | 51 | 4 | 11 | 15 | 18 | — | — | — | — | — |
| 2001–02 | Atlanta Thrashers | NHL | 61 | 5 | 20 | 25 | 24 | — | — | — | — | — |
| 2002–03 | Atlanta Thrashers | NHL | 79 | 7 | 19 | 26 | 32 | — | — | — | — | — |
| 2003–04 | Atlanta Thrashers | NHL | 67 | 3 | 26 | 29 | 30 | — | — | — | — | — |
| 2004–05 | HC Rabat Kladno | ELH | 22 | 5 | 11 | 16 | 34 | — | — | — | — | — |
| 2004–05 | Modo Hockey | SEL | 8 | 2 | 2 | 4 | 0 | 6 | 1 | 0 | 1 | 27 |
| 2005–06 | Carolina Hurricanes | NHL | 77 | 6 | 38 | 44 | 46 | 25 | 4 | 9 | 13 | 8 |
| 2006–07 | Carolina Hurricanes | NHL | 27 | 2 | 6 | 8 | 20 | — | — | — | — | — |
| 2007–08 | Carolina Hurricanes | NHL | 80 | 0 | 22 | 22 | 30 | — | — | — | — | — |
| 2008–09 | Carolina Hurricanes | NHL | 30 | 1 | 7 | 8 | 8 | 7 | 0 | 1 | 1 | 2 |
| 2009–10 | HC GEUS OKNA Kladno | ELH | 52 | 4 | 12 | 16 | 70 | — | — | — | — | — |
| 2010–11 | HC Eaton Pardubice | ELH | 52 | 5 | 9 | 14 | 34 | 9 | 0 | 3 | 3 | 6 |
| 2011–12 | HC Škoda Plzeň | ELH | 29 | 3 | 10 | 13 | 26 | 8 | 0 | 1 | 1 | 2 |
| ELH totals | | | 244 | 28 | 75 | 103 | 194 | 36 | 1 | 8 | 9 | 24 |
| SEL totals | | | 189 | 30 | 42 | 72 | 88 | 36 | 4 | 7 | 11 | 39 |
| NHL totals | | | 523 | 29 | 164 | 193 | 218 | 32 | 4 | 10 | 14 | 10 |

=== International ===
| Year | Team | Event | GP | G | A | Pts | PIM |
|---|---|---|---|---|---|---|---|
| 1991 | Czechoslovakia | EJC | 5 | 2 | 3 | 5 | 2 |
| 1992 | Czechoslovakia | WJC | 7 | 1 | 0 | 1 | 6 |
| 1993 | Czechoslovakia | WJC | 7 | 0 | 1 | 1 | 4 |
| 1995 | Czech Republic | WC | 6 | 0 | 0 | 0 | 0 |
| 1996 | Czech Republic | WC | 8 | 2 | 3 | 5 | 4 |
| 1996 | Czech Republic | WCH | 2 | 0 | 0 | 0 | 2 |
| 1997 | Czech Republic | WC | 9 | 0 | 3 | 3 | 0 |
| 1998 | Czech Republic | WC | 9 | 0 | 4 | 4 | 0 |
| 1999 | Czech Republic | WC | 10 | 3 | 3 | 6 | 0 |
| 2000 | Czech Republic | WC | 8 | 2 | 3 | 5 | 6 |
| 2001 | Czech Republic | WC | 9 | 1 | 0 | 1 | 4 |
| 2002 | Czech Republic | WC | 7 | 1 | 0 | 1 | 0 |
| 2004 | Czech Republic | WC | 7 | 0 | 4 | 4 | 6 |
| 2005 | Czech Republic | WC | 9 | 1 | 0 | 1 | 4 |
| 2006 | Czech Republic | OG | 8 | 0 | 1 | 1 | 6 |
| Junior totals | | | 19 | 3 | 4 | 7 | 12 |
| Senior totals | | | 92 | 10 | 21 | 31 | 32 |

== See also ==
- Notable families in the NHL
- List of Olympic medalist families
