= Tomáš Kaberle =

Czech ice hockey player (born 1978)

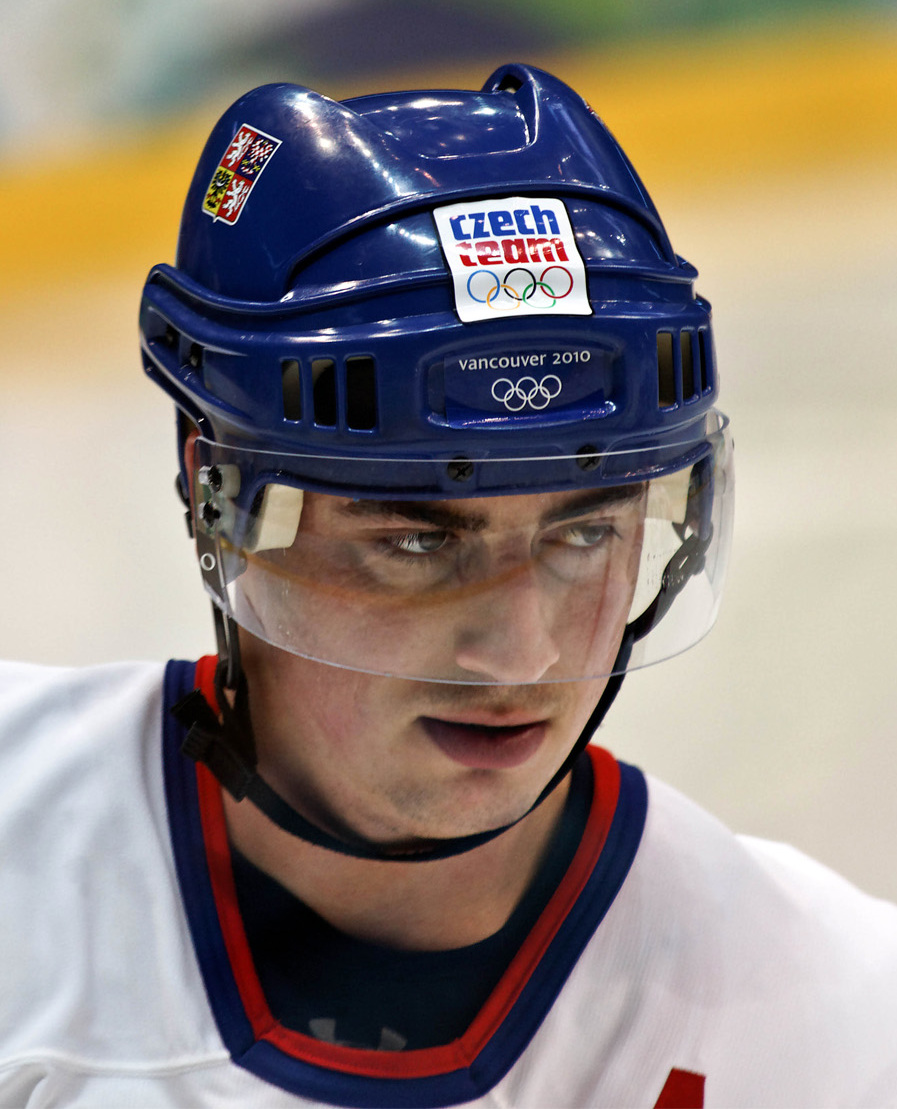
- Kaberle with the Czech Republic in 2010
- Born: March 2, 1978 (age 48) Rakovník, Czechoslovakia
- Height: 6 ft 1 in (185 cm)
- Weight: 214 lb (97 kg; 15 st 4 lb)
- Position: Defence
- Shot: Left
- Played for: HC Kladno; Toronto Maple Leafs; Boston Bruins; Carolina Hurricanes; Montreal Canadiens; HC Kometa Brno
- National team: Czech Republic
- NHL draft: 204th overall, 1996; Toronto Maple Leafs
- Playing career: 1994–2016

Tomáš Kaberle (Czech pronunciation: [ˈtomaːʃ ˈkabɛrlɛ]; born March 2, 1978) is a Czech former professional ice hockey defenceman. He played in the National Hockey League (NHL), most notably for the Toronto Maple Leafs, as well as for the Boston Bruins, with whom he won the Stanley Cup, Carolina Hurricanes and the Montreal Canadiens. Kaberle also played in the Czech Extraliga for HC Kladno and HC Kometa Brno.

A four-time NHL All-Star, Kaberle also played for the Czech national team and won a bronze medal with the team at the 2006 Winter Olympics. Kaberle is currently the second-highest scoring defenceman in Maple Leafs franchise history, behind only Börje Salming.

== Life ==
Kaberle was born in Rakovník, however he comes from Velká Dobrá near Kladno, and has a house there.

Kaberle comes from an ice hockey family. His older brother František has also played as a defenceman in the NHL, and their father, František Sr., played for the Czechoslovakia national team in the 1970s and '80s.

== Playing career ==
=== Toronto Maple Leafs ===
Kaberle was drafted 204th in the eighth round of the 1996 NHL entry draft by the Toronto Maple Leafs, and saw limited playing time in the 1998–99 season. After being eased into the Leafs lineup, he saw a significant increase in playing time in order to help fill in the gap on the Leafs after an injury to Bryan Berard in the 1999–2000 season. By the 2001–02 campaign, Kaberle had improved enough to be selected to the World team at the 2002 NHL All-Star Game. Later that year, he was named to the Czech national team for the 2002 Winter Olympics in Salt Lake City, Utah.

Kaberle started the 2001–02 campaign as a restricted free agent without a contract, and ended up playing in the Czech Extraliga for HC Rabat Kladno while a new contract was negotiated. Ultimately, he signed a contract with the Leafs, who secured his services through 2005–06. On February 11, 2006, Kaberle was re-signed to a five-year, $21.25 million contract extension with a no-trade clause for the first three years of the contract, effective July 1, 2006. This deal locked him in until the end of the 2010–11 season.

On October 28, 2006, Kaberle scored his first career hat-trick, against the Montreal Canadiens. He also scored in his first shootout attempt that night. Kaberle was named as an Eastern Conference All-Star Game participant for the second time in his career on January 12, 2007.

During a March 2, 2007, game against the New Jersey Devils, Kaberle suffered a concussion and was carried off the ice on a stretcher as a result of a late hit to the head by Cam Janssen. While no penalty was called on the play, Janssen was later given a three-game suspension. In an interview, Kaberle mentioned Janssen had not contacted him for reconciliation and went on to say, "I don't care [to hear from him]. He doesn't respect me and I don't respect him." After missing eight games, he returned to the Leafs lineup on March 23.

Although Kaberle has scored relatively few goals, he has scored seven times in overtime.

During the 2008 NHL All-Star Game Skills Competition, Kaberle became the fourth player, after Ray Bourque, Mark Messier and Jeremy Roenick, to hit all four targets in four shots in the accuracy challenge. Kaberle again participated in the accuracy challenge during the 2009 NHL All-Star Game in Montreal, although he was unable to defend his title against Evgeni Malkin of the Pittsburgh Penguins.

During a losing streak at the start of the 2009–10 regular season, Kaberle, along with Niklas Hagman, led the Leafs to their first victory of the season, a 6–3 victory over the Anaheim Ducks. Kaberle had one goal and four assists, and earned the second star of the game. He began the season on a hot streak, scoring 22 points in the first 20 games while leading the NHL in defenceman scoring. On December 1, 2009, Kaberle passed former Leaf great Tim Horton for second on the franchise all-time scoring list amongst defencemen with his 459th NHL point.

=== Later years ===
On February 18, 2011, in a well-publicized trade, Kaberle was traded to the Boston Bruins in exchange for prospect Joe Colborne, Boston's first-round draft pick in 2011 and a second-round pick in 2012, conditional upon the Bruins reaching the 2011 Stanley Cup Final or re-signing Kaberle. He ultimately won the Stanley Cup with the Bruins on June 15, 2011, prevailing over the Vancouver Canucks.

On July 5, 2011, Kaberle signed a three-year, $12.75 million with the Carolina Hurricanes. He played in 29 games for the Hurricanes, registering nine assists and a plus-minus rating of –12. On December 9, 2011, Kaberle, in only the first year of his contract, was traded to the Montreal Canadiens in exchange for Jaroslav Špaček. He recorded two assists in his first game in a Canadiens uniform, a 2–1 victory over the New Jersey Devils.

Kaberle returned to his native Czech Republic to play for HC Kladno during the 2012–13 lockout. After playing ten games in the Czech Extraliga, he decided to cease playing and spend more time with his family on October 25, 2012. However, having returned for the shortened 2012–13 season, Kaberle was primarily a healthy scratch amongst the resurgent Canadiens blueline. On March 30, 2013, he was placed on waivers by the team, going unclaimed by any NHL club. He finished the season appearing in a career-low ten games for three points.

On June 28, 2013, Kaberle was given a compliance buyout by the Canadiens to be released as a free agent.

In September 2013, Kaberle signed a one-year contract to return with his hometown club, HC Kladno.

In September 2014, Kaberle was invited to attend the New Jersey Devils training camp for the 2014–15 season on an unsigned tryout basis, where he was later released.

On September 22, 2016, it was announced by HC Kladno that Kaberle had officially retired from professional hockey.

== International ==
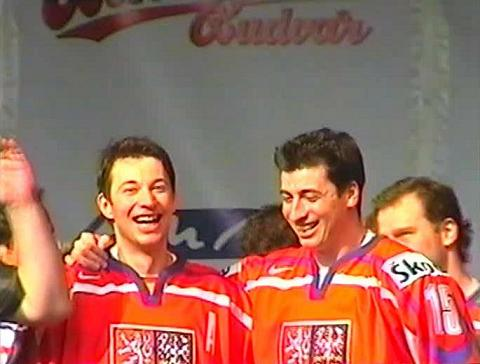
- Tomáš (right) with his brother František in 2005

Medal record

Representing Czech Republic

Ice hockey

Olympic Games
Bronze medal – third place	2006 Turin	

World Championships
Gold medal – first place	2005 Vienna	
Silver medal – second place	2006 Riga	

Kaberle was selected to the Czech national team at the 2002 Winter Olympics in Salt Lake City, Utah, where they were eliminated in the quarter-finals.

Kaberle and his older brother František were members of the Czech team at the 2005 World Ice Hockey Championships in Vienna, where they won gold. While František won the World Championships for the fifth time, it was the first victory for Tomáš. In December 2005, they were both named for the 2006 Winter Olympics in Turin, where they won bronze medals with the team. The next year, Kaberle accepted his nomination for 2006 World Championships in Riga, where the Czech team won silver. Tomas also played in the 2010 Winter Olympics, but rejected an invitation to play at the 2010 World Ice Hockey Championships held in Germany.

== Post-playing career ==
During the COVID-19 pandemic in Canada, Kaberle helped his wife Julia Kaberle with the increased takeout demand for her high-end Italian restaurant Quanto Basta by delivering takeout orders.

== Career statistics ==
=== Regular season and playoffs ===
			Regular season					Playoffs
Season	Team	League	GP	G	A	Pts	PIM	GP	G	A	Pts	PIM
1994–95	Poldi SONP Kladno	CZE U20	37	7	10	17	—	—	—	—	—	—
1994–95	Poldi SONP Kladno	ELH	1	0	1	1	0	3	0	0	0	2
1995–96	HC Poldi Kladno	CZE U20	23	6	13	19	—	—	—	—	—	—
1995–96	HC Poldi Kladno	ELH	23	0	1	1	2	2	0	0	0	0
1996–97	HC Poldi Kladno	ELH	49	0	5	5	26	3	0	0	0	0
1997–98	HC Velvana Kladno	ELH	47	4	19	23	12	—	—	—	—	—
1997–98	St. John's Maple Leafs	AHL	2	0	0	0	0	—	—	—	—	—
1998–99	Toronto Maple Leafs	NHL	57	4	18	22	12	14	0	3	3	2
1999–2000	Toronto Maple Leafs	NHL	82	7	33	40	24	12	1	4	5	0
2000–01	Toronto Maple Leafs	NHL	82	6	39	45	24	11	1	3	4	0
2001–02	HC Vagnerplast Kladno	ELH	9	1	7	8	4	—	—	—	—	—
2001–02	Toronto Maple Leafs	NHL	69	10	29	39	2	20	2	8	10	16
2002–03	Toronto Maple Leafs	NHL	82	11	36	47	30	7	2	1	3	0
2003–04	Toronto Maple Leafs	NHL	71	3	28	31	18	13	0	3	3	6
2004–05	HC Rabat Kladno	ELH	49	8	31	39	38	7	1	0	1	0
2005–06	Toronto Maple Leafs	NHL	82	9	58	67	46	—	—	—	—	—
2006–07	Toronto Maple Leafs	NHL	74	11	47	58	20	—	—	—	—	—
2007–08	Toronto Maple Leafs	NHL	82	8	45	53	22	—	—	—	—	—
2008–09	Toronto Maple Leafs	NHL	57	4	27	31	8	—	—	—	—	—
2009–10	Toronto Maple Leafs	NHL	82	7	42	49	24	—	—	—	—	—
2010–11	Toronto Maple Leafs	NHL	58	3	35	38	16	—	—	—	—	—
2010–11	Boston Bruins	NHL	24	1	8	9	2	25	0	11	11	4
2011–12	Carolina Hurricanes	NHL	29	0	9	9	2	—	—	—	—	—
2011–12	Montreal Canadiens	NHL	43	3	19	22	10	—	—	—	—	—
2012–13	Rytíři Kladno	ELH	10	2	4	6	2	—	—	—	—	—
2012–13	Montreal Canadiens	NHL	10	0	3	3	0	—	—	—	—	—
2013–14	Rytíři Kladno	ELH	48	4	20	24	26	—	—	—	—	—
2014–15	Hartford Wolf Pack	AHL	2	0	2	2	0	—	—	—	—	—
2014–15	Rytíři Kladno	CZE II	24	5	21	26	4	7	1	8	9	2
2015–16	HC Kometa Brno	ELH	51	3	17	20	24	4	0	0	0	2
ELH totals			287	22	105	127	134	19	1	0	1	2
NHL totals			984	87	476	563	260	102	6	33	39	28

=== International ===
Year	Team	Event	Result	GP	G	A	Pts	PIM
1995	Czech Republic	EJC	5th	5	0	5	5	0
1996	Czech Republic	EJC	5th	5	2	2	4	4
1998	Czech Republic	WJC	4th	7	1	1	2	2
2002	Czech Republic	OG	7th	4	0	1	1	2
2003	Czech Republic	WC	4th	7	0	7	7	2
2004	Czech Republic	WCH	3rd place, bronze medalist(s)	4	0	1	1	0
2005	Czech Republic	WC	1st place, gold medalist(s)	9	1	3	4	4
2006	Czech Republic	OG	3rd place, bronze medalist(s)	8	2	2	4	2
2006	Czech Republic	WC	2nd place, silver medalist(s)	9	1	5	6	31
2008	Czech Republic	WC	5th	7	1	9	10	0
2010	Czech Republic	OG	7th	5	1	2	3	0
2014	Czech Republic	OG	6th	5	0	3	3	0
Junior totals				17	3	8	11	6
Senior totals				58	6	33	39	41

== Honours ==
- Played in NHL All-Star Game - 2002, 2007, 2008, 2009
- Won NHL All-Star Game Accuracy Competition - 2008
- Toronto Maple Leafs' Molson Cup winner - 2009–10
- Stanley Cup champion - 2010–11 (as a member of the Boston Bruins)

== See also ==
- List of family relations in the National Hockey League
- List of Olympic medalist families
