= 2020–21 NHL suspensions and fines =

The following is a list of all suspensions and fines enforced in the National Hockey League (NHL) during the 2020–21 NHL season. It lists which players or coaches of what team have been punished for which offense and the amount of punishment they have received. The season was shortened to 56 games featuring exclusively intra-division play due to the COVID-19 pandemic. No pre-season games were played.

Players' money forfeited due to suspension or fine goes to the Players' Emergency Assistance Fund, while money forfeited by coaches, staff or organizations as a whole goes to the NHL Foundation.

== Suspensions ==
Based on each player's average annual salary, divided by number of days in the season (116) for non-repeat offenders and games (56) for repeat offenders, salary will be forfeited for the term of their suspension.

^{†} - suspension covered at least one 2021 postseason game
^{R} - Player was considered a repeat offender under the terms of the Collective Bargaining Agreement (player had been suspended in the 18 months prior to this suspension)

Date of incident	Offender	Team(s)	Offense(s)	Date of action	Length	Salary forfeited^{1}
January 13, 2021	Sammy Blais	St. Louis Blues	Illegal check to the head of Devon Toews.	January 14, 2021	2 games	$25,862.07
July 26, 2020	John Chayka	No team^{2}	Conduct detrimental to the league.^{2}	January 25, 2021	341 days^{†}^{2}	N/A
January 28, 2021	Kevin Fiala	Minnesota Wild	Boarding Matt Roy.	January 29, 2021	3 games	$77,586.21
February 12, 2021	Johan Larsson	Arizona Coyotes	Illegal check to the head of Zach Sanford.	February 13, 2021	2 games	$24,137.94
March 1, 2021	Alex Chiasson	Edmonton Oilers	Cross-checking Jimmy Vesey.	March 2, 2021	1 game	$18,534.48
March 3, 2021	Joachim Blichfeld	San Jose Sharks	Illegal check to the head of Nathan MacKinnon.	March 4, 2021	2 games	$12,701.14
March 5, 2021	Tom Wilson	Washington Capitals	Boarding Brandon Carlo.	March 6, 2021	7 games	$311,781.61
March 9, 2021	Dante Fabbro	Nashville Predators	Elbowing Brock McGinn.	March 10, 2021	2 games	$15,948.28
March 16, 2021	Carson Soucy	Minnesota Wild	Charging Conor Garland.	March 17, 2021	1 game	$23,706.90
March 31, 2021	Chandler Stephenson	Vegas Golden Knights	Elbowing Tobias Bjornfot.	April 1, 2021	3 games	$71,120.69
April 7, 2021	Jacob MacDonald	Colorado Avalanche	Illegal check to the head of Ryan Hartman.	April 8, 2021	2 games	$12,500.00
April 10, 2021	Michael McCarron	Nashville Predators	Illegal check to the head of Yanni Gourde.	April 11, 2021	2 games	$12,068.97
April 18, 2021	Alexander Edler	Vancouver Canucks	Kneeing Zach Hyman.	April 19, 2021	2 games	$103,448.28
May 4, 2021	Shayne Gostisbehere	Philadelphia Flyers	Boarding Mark Friedman.	May 5, 2021	2 games	$77,586.21
May 5, 2021	Pavel Buchnevich	New York Rangers	High-sticking Anthony Mantha.	May 6, 2021	1 game	$28,017.24
May 6, 2021	Zack MacEwen	Vancouver Canucks	Kneeing Darnell Nurse.	May 7, 2021	1 game	$7,112.07
May 8, 2021	Pat Maroon	Tampa Bay Lightning	Unsportsmanlike conduct against Brandon Montour.	May 9, 2021	1 game	$7,758.62
May 16, 2021	Sam Bennett	Florida Panthers	Boarding Blake Coleman.	May 17, 2021	1 game^{†}	N/A
May 19, 2021	Nazem Kadri	Colorado Avalanche	Illegal check to the head of Justin Faulk.	May 21, 2021	8 games^{†}^{3}	N/A
May 23, 2021	Josh Archibald	Edmonton Oilers	Clipping Logan Stanley.	May 24, 2021	1 game^{†}	N/A
May 30, 2021	Ryan Reaves^{R}	Vegas Golden Knights	Roughing/unsportsmanlike conduct against Ryan Graves.	May 31, 2021	2 games^{†}	N/A
June 2, 2021	Mark Scheifele	Winnipeg Jets	Charging Jake Evans.	June 3, 2021	4 games^{†} (3 post-season + 1 2021–22 regular season)^{4}	N/A
Player totals:					49 games^{†} (34 regular + 15 postseason)	$829,870.71

=== Notes ===
1. All figures are in US dollars.
2. While no longer serving in a capacity with the team, the NHL ruled that Chayka's July 26, 2020 departure as general manager of the Arizona Coyotes breached his obligation to the club, by pursuing other opportunities while under contract. Chayka's suspension forbids him from working for any NHL club, in any capacity, through December 31, 2021.
3. Suspension was appealed by Kadri on May 23, 2021. On May 31, 2021, NHL Commissioner Gary Bettman announced he had heard the appeal and was upholding the original 8 game suspension levied to Kadri. The NHLPA then appealed to a neutral arbitrator on behalf of Kadri, on the same day. On June 8, 2021, NHL/NHLPA Neutral Discipline Arbitrator, Shyam Das, upheld the NHL's 8-game suspension.
4. As the Winnipeg Jets were eliminated from the playoffs, the remaining game of Scheifele's suspension was instead made to be served in his first game of the 2021–22 NHL season.

== Fines ==
Players can be fined up to 50% of one day's salary, up to a maximum of $10,000.00 for their first offense, and $15,000.00 for any subsequent offenses (player had been fined in the 12 months prior to this fine). Coaches, non-playing personnel, and teams are not restricted to such maximums, though can still be treated as repeat offenders.

Fines for players/coaches fined for diving/embellishment are structured uniquely and are only handed out after non-publicized warnings are given to the player/coach for their first offense. For more details on diving/embellishment fines:

Diving/embellishment specifications
Incident Number^{1}	Player Fine^{2}	Coach Fine^{2}
1	Warning (N/A)	Warning (N/A)
2	$2,000	N/A
3	$3,000	N/A
4	$4,000	N/A
5	$5,000	$2,000
6	$5,000	$3,000
7	$5,000	$4,000
8+	$5,000	$5,000

1. For coach incident totals, each citation issued to a player on his club counts toward his total.
2. All figures are in US dollars.

Fines listed in italics indicate that was the maximum allowed fine.

Date of incident	Offender	Team	Offense	Date of action	Amount^{1}
January 15, 2021	Jared McCann	Pittsburgh Penguins	Elbowing Travis Sanheim.	January 16, 2021	$10,000.00
January 18, 2021	Nicolas Aube-Kubel	Philadelphia Flyers	Roughing Rasmus Dahlin.	January 19, 2021	$4,633.62
January 18, 2021	Elias Pettersson	Vancouver Canucks	Slashing Sean Monahan.	January 19, 2021	$3,987.07
January 18, 2021	Greg Pateryn	Minnesota Wild	Cross-checking Sonny Milano.	January 19, 2021	$5,000.00
January 20, 2021	Team	Washington Capitals	Violating League's COVID-19 Protocols.	January 20, 2021	$100,000.00
January 31, 2021	Nick Bjugstad	Minnesota Wild	Cross-checking Ryan Graves.	February 1, 2021	$5,000.00
February 6, 2021	Radim Simek	San Jose Sharks	Spearing Adam Henrique.	February 7, 2021	$5,000.00
February 20, 2021	Austin Strand	Los Angeles Kings	Cross-checking Conor Garland.	February 21, 2021	$3,168.10
February 23, 2021	Antoine Roussel	Vancouver Canucks	Roughing Jesse Puljujarvi.	February 24, 2021	$5,000.00
March 2, 2021	Nino Niederreiter	Carolina Hurricanes	Interference against Juuse Saros.	March 3, 2021	$5,000.00
March 3, 2021	Alexander Ovechkin	Washington Capitals	Spearing Trent Frederic.	March 4, 2021	$5,000.00
March 4, 2021	Brett Pesce	Carolina Hurricanes	Dangerous trip against Robby Fabbri.	March 4, 2021	$5,000.00
March 6, 2021	Kailer Yamamoto	Edmonton Oilers	Dangerous trip against Rasmus Andersson.	March 7, 2021	$3,854.17
March 22, 2021	Kurtis Gabriel	San Jose Sharks	Altercation prior to the start of the game (cross-checking Kurtis MacDermid).	March 23, 2021	$3,017.24
March 22, 2021	Bob Boughner (head coach)	San Jose Sharks	Altercation prior to the start of the game.^{2}	March 23, 2021	$5,000.00
March 25, 2021	Samuel Morin	Philadelphia Flyers	Unsportsmanlike conduct against Brendan Lemieux.	March 26, 2021	$3,017.24
March 26, 2021	Nick Schmaltz	Arizona Coyotes	Boarding Radim Simek.	March 27, 2021	$5,000.00
March 30, 2021	Connor McDavid	Edmonton Oilers	Elbowing Jesperi Kotkaniemi.	March 31, 2021	$5,000.00
March 31, 2021	Nathan MacKinnon	Colorado Avalanche	Unsportsmanlike conduct against Conor Garland.	April 1, 2021	$5,000.00
April 15, 2021	Zach Hyman	Toronto Maple Leafs	High-sticking Neal Pionk.	April 16, 2021	$5,000.00
April 22, 2021	Joe Thornton	Toronto Maple Leafs	Interference against Mathieu Perreault.	April 23, 2021	$3,017.24
April 22, 2021	Mathew Barzal	New York Islanders	Diving/Embellishment (second citation).^{3}	April 29, 2021	$2,000.00
May 3, 2021	Tom Wilson	Washington Capitals	Roughing Pavel Buchnevich.	May 4, 2021	$5,000.00
May 4, 2021	Team	New York Rangers	Public comments criticizing an NHL official.	May 6, 2021	$250,000.00
April 30, 2021	Mikko Rantanen	Colorado Avalanche	Diving/Embellishment (second citation).^{4}	May 6, 2021	$2,000.00 $0.00^{#}^{5}
May 8, 2021	Brandon Montour	Florida Panthers	Spearing Pat Maroon.	May 9, 2021	$5,000.00
May 8, 2021	Joel Edmundson	Montreal Canadiens	Dangerous trip against John Tavares.	May 9, 2021	$1,000.00
May 8, 2021	MacKenzie Weegar	Florida Panthers	High-sticking Mathieu Joseph.	May 9, 2021	$5,000.00
May 13, 2021	Ryan Hartman	Minnesota Wild	Dangerous trip against Sammy Blais.	May 14, 2021	$5,000.00
May 21, 2021	Jordan Staal	Carolina Hurricanes	Dangerous trip against Luke Kunin.	May 22, 2021	$5,000.00
May 21, 2021	Anthony Mantha	Washington Capitals	Goaltender interference against Tuukka Rask.	May 22, 2021	$5,000.00
May 22, 2021	Shea Weber	Montreal Canadiens	Cross-checking Wayne Simmonds.	May 23, 2021	$5,000.00
May 24, 2021	Pat Maroon	Tampa Bay Lightning	Unsportsmanlike conduct against Noel Acciari.	May 25, 2021	$3,879.31
May 24, 2021	Ryan McDonagh	Tampa Bay Lightning	Cross-checking Mason Marchment.	May 25, 2021	$5,000.00
May 31, 2021	Jake DeBrusk	Boston Bruins	Cross-checking Scott Mayfield.	June 1, 2021	$5,000.00
June 5, 2021	David Krejci	Boston Bruins	Slashing Mathew Barzal.	June 6, 2021	$5,000.00
June 7, 2021	Bruce Cassidy (head coach)	Boston Bruins	Inappropriate comments against officials during a postgame press conference.	June 8, 2021	$25,000.00
June 7, 2021	Nick Ritchie	Boston Bruins	Elbowing Scott Mayfield.	June 8, 2021	$5,000.00
June 21, 2021	Mathew Barzal	New York Islanders	Cross-checking Jan Rutta.	June 22, 2021	$5,000.00
June 28, 2021	Shea Weber^{R}	Montreal Canadiens	Slashing Nikita Kucherov.	June 29, 2021	$5,000.00
Totals:					$501,573.99

=== Notes ===
1. All figures are in US dollars.
2. The San Jose Sharks were also assessed a conditional fine of $25,000 that would be assessed in the event of similar inappropriate behavior through March 22, 2022.
3. Barzal was issued his first citation following an incident on January 30, 2021.
4. Rantanen was issued his first citation following an incident on March 23, 2021.
5. It was reported on June 4, 2021 that Rantanen's diving/embellishment fine had been rescinded by the NHL following an appeal by Rantanen.

== See also ==
- 2019–20 NHL suspensions and fines
- 2021–22 NHL suspensions and fines
- 2020 in sports
- 2021 in sports
- 2020–21 NHL season
- 2020–21 NHL transactions
