= Taylor Pyatt =

Canadian ice hockey player (born 1981)

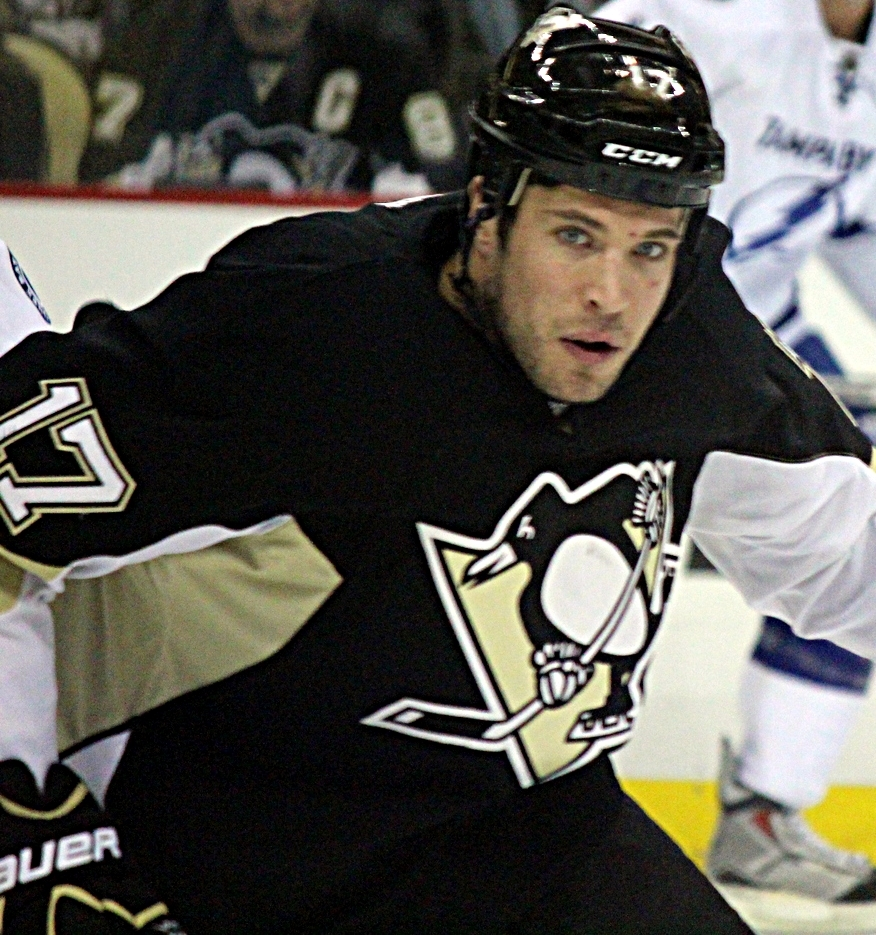
- Pyatt with the Penguins in 2014.
- Born: August 19, 1981 (age 45) Thunder Bay, Ontario, Canada
- Height: 6 ft 4 in (193 cm)
- Weight: 235 lb (107 kg; 16 st 11 lb)
- Position: Left wing
- Shot: Left
- Played for: New York Islanders; Buffalo Sabres; Vancouver Canucks; Phoenix Coyotes; New York Rangers; Pittsburgh Penguins; Genève-Servette HC
- NHL draft: 8th overall, 1999; New York Islanders
- Playing career: 1999–2015

Taylor William Pyatt (born August 19, 1981) is a Canadian former professional ice hockey player who played in the National Hockey League (NHL) for the New York Islanders, Buffalo Sabres, Vancouver Canucks, Phoenix Coyotes, New York Rangers and Pittsburgh Penguins. Drafted from the Ontario Hockey League (OHL), he played major junior hockey with the Sudbury Wolves.

== Playing career ==
=== Early career ===
Pyatt played three seasons with the Sudbury Wolves of the Ontario Hockey League (OHL). After scoring 75 points in 68 games in his second OHL season, Pyatt was selected eighth overall in the 1999 NHL entry draft by the New York Islanders. The next season, his third and final with Sudbury, Pyatt scored 89 points in 68 games, earning OHL First All-Star Team honours.

=== New York Islanders and Buffalo Sabres ===
In 2000–01, Pyatt made the final cut out of the Islanders' training camp as the only player with no prior NHL experience. On November 27, 2000, he scored his first NHL goal, against the Tampa Bay Lightning. After Pyatt's rookie season, during which he scored 18 points in 78 games, the Islanders traded him to the Buffalo Sabres (along with Tim Connolly) in exchange for Frank J. Selke Trophy winner Michael Peca in a draft-day trade.

During the 2004–05 lockout, Pyatt went overseas to play for Hammarby IF of the Swedish HockeyAllsvenskan.

=== Vancouver Canucks ===
After four seasons with Buffalo, on July 14, 2006, Pyatt was traded to the Vancouver Canucks in exchange for a fourth-round draft pick in the 2007 NHL entry draft (later traded by Buffalo to the Calgary Flames). Pyatt benefitted from playing on the Canucks' top line with twins Henrik and Daniel Sedin, leading to career highs in goals and points, with 23 and 37 respectively.

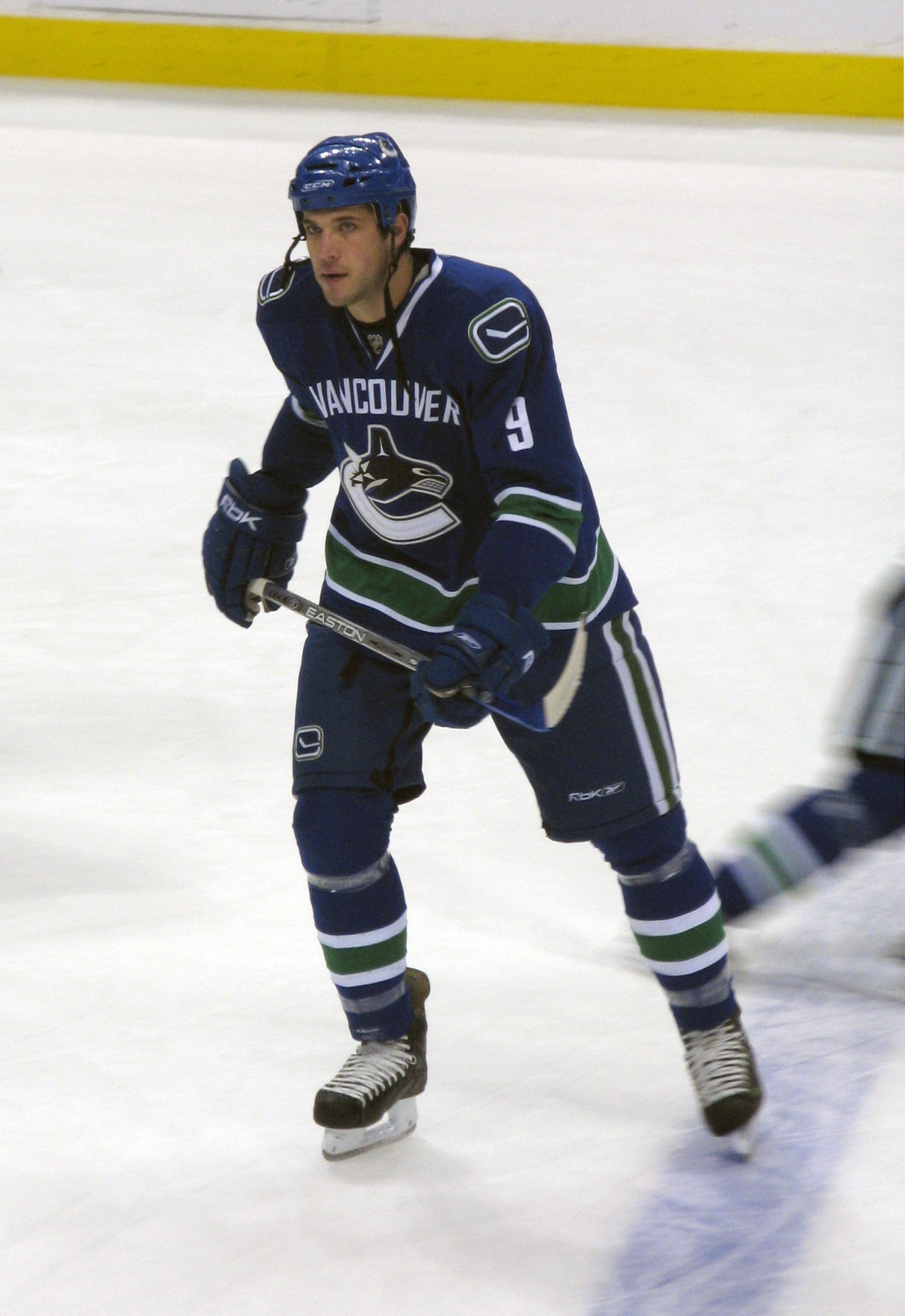
Pyatt with the Canucks in 2007.

During the 2007–08 season, on January 13, 2008, Pyatt took a stick to the face. Getting in the way of an Eric Brewer clearing attempt in a game against the St. Louis Blues, he required 25 stitches in his upper lip and a splint in his mouth to hold up his teeth. He wore a full face shield upon his return to the lineup and elected to wear a visor for the remainder of his Vancouver tenure. Despite being taken off the Canucks' top line with the Sedins during the season, Pyatt completed the campaign matching his career-high of 37 points, as well as setting a new career mark for assists with 21. The next season, in 2008–09, Pyatt was sidelined for eight games due to a foot injury suffered on December 17, 2008. Following an injury to Pavol Demitra during the 2009 playoffs, Pyatt made his return to the lineup on May 5 for Game 3 of the second round against the Chicago Blackhawks. Following the Canucks' second round elimination, it was revealed Pyatt required off-season surgery to his knee.

=== Phoenix Coyotes ===
After not being re-signed by the Canucks, Pyatt became an unrestricted free agent on July 1, 2009. Two months later, he signed a one-year, $600,000 contract with the Phoenix Coyotes. Going into his first season with the Coyotes, Pyatt suffered a lower body injury during training camp and missed the team's first five regular season games. One month after returning to the Coyotes' lineup, he and younger brother Tom Pyatt of the Montreal Canadiens played against each other for the first time in their careers. On December 23, 2009, as the Coyotes played their final game before the NHL Christmas break against the Anaheim Ducks, Pyatt scored the second goal of the game, his 200th career NHL point. Near the end of the regular season, Pyatt recorded a Gordie Howe hat trick against the Colorado Avalanche after scoring a goal, recording an assist and engaging in a fight. The Coyotes defeated the Avalanche 6–2 and clinched their first playoff berth in seven seasons. Pyatt finished the regular season with 12 goals and 23 points in 74 games played. In the playoffs, he scored one goal and recorded one assist as the Coyotes were eliminated in the Western Conference Quarterfinals by the Detroit Red Wings in seven games.

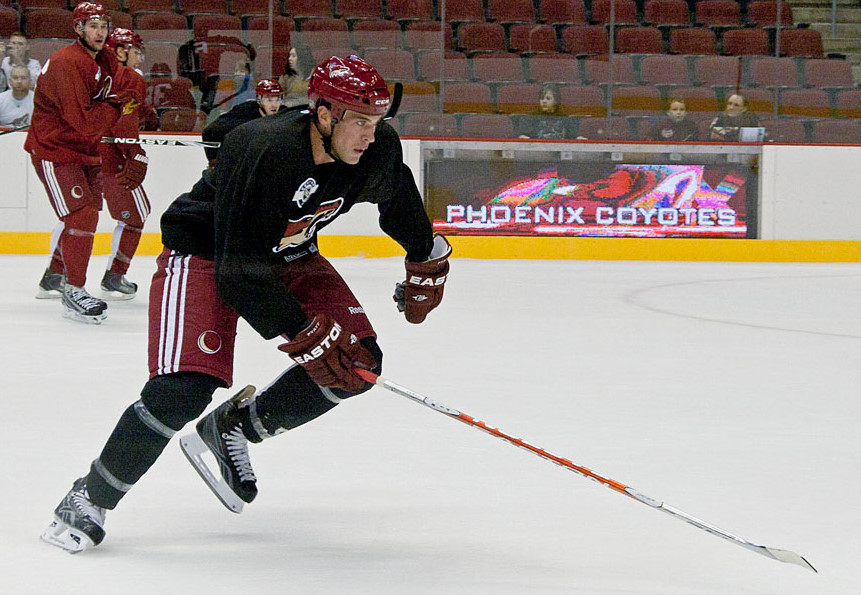
Pyatt with the Coyotes in 2010.

On June 21, 2010, Pyatt signed a two-year, $2 million contract extension with Phoenix, avoiding unrestricted free agency. In his second season with the Coyotes, Pyatt began scoring more frequently than in his previous season. However, on December 20, 2010, in a 6–1 loss to the Pittsburgh Penguins, Pyatt suffered an upper body injury during a fight with Penguins enforcer Deryk Engelland and was subsequently placed on the Coyotes' injured reserve list. After missing four games, he returned to the lineup for the Coyotes' New Year's Eve game against the St. Louis Blues.

=== New York Rangers and Pittsburgh Penguins ===
On July 3, 2012, Pyatt signed with the New York Rangers on a two-year, $3.1 million contract. In the final year of his contract with the Rangers on January 2, 2014, Pyatt was claimed off of waivers by the Pittsburgh Penguins. He scored his first goal with the Penguins on January 15, 2014, against the Washington Capitals. He would add three more goals during the remainder of the season. He did not play in the 2014 playoffs.

=== Switzerland and retirement ===
On July 24, 2014, with indication of little NHL interest, Pyatt agreed to a one-year free agent contract with Swiss team Genève-Servette HC of the National League A. For the first time in his career, Pyatt played alongside brother Tom Pyatt with Genève-Servette.

After one season in Switzerland, his 15th professional season, Pyatt retired from professional hockey.

== Personal life ==
Pyatt is one of three sons of Kathie and former NHL player Nelson Pyatt. His younger brother by six years, Tom Pyatt, was also a professional ice hockey player.

== Career statistics ==
			Regular season					Playoffs
Season	Team	League	GP	G	A	Pts	PIM	GP	G	A	Pts	PIM
1996–97	Thunder Bay Kings Bantam AAA	TBAHA	60	52	61	113	72	—	—	—	—	—
1997–98	Sudbury Wolves	OHL	58	14	17	31	104	10	3	1	4	8
1998–99	Sudbury Wolves	OHL	68	37	38	75	95	4	0	4	4	6
1999–2000	Sudbury Wolves	OHL	68	40	49	89	98	12	8	7	15	25
2000–01	New York Islanders	NHL	78	4	14	18	39	—	—	—	—	—
2001–02	Rochester Americans	AHL	27	6	4	10	36	—	—	—	—	—
2001–02	Buffalo Sabres	NHL	48	10	10	20	35	—	—	—	—	—
2002–03	Buffalo Sabres	NHL	78	14	14	28	38	—	—	—	—	—
2003–04	Buffalo Sabres	NHL	63	8	12	20	25	—	—	—	—	—
2004–05	Hammarby IF	SWE.2	24	11	9	20	20	—	—	—	—	—
2005–06	Buffalo Sabres	NHL	41	6	6	12	33	14	0	5	5	10
2006–07	Vancouver Canucks	NHL	76	23	14	37	42	12	2	4	6	6
2007–08	Vancouver Canucks	NHL	79	16	21	37	60	—	—	—	—	—
2008–09	Vancouver Canucks	NHL	69	10	9	19	43	4	0	0	0	2
2009–10	Phoenix Coyotes	NHL	74	12	11	23	39	7	1	1	2	2
2010–11	Phoenix Coyotes	NHL	76	18	13	31	27	4	1	0	1	0
2011–12	Phoenix Coyotes	NHL	73	9	10	19	23	16	4	2	6	2
2012–13	New York Rangers	NHL	48	6	5	11	6	12	2	2	4	4
2013–14	New York Rangers	NHL	22	0	1	1	10	—	—	—	—	—
2013–14	Pittsburgh Penguins	NHL	34	4	0	4	10	—	—	—	—	—
2014–15	Genève–Servette HC	NLA	38	14	11	25	18	8	4	1	5	4
NHL totals			859	140	140	280	430	69	10	14	24	26

== Awards and achievements ==
=== Junior ===
Award	Year(s)
OHL First All-Star Team	2000
OHL Plus/Minus Award	2000
CHL Third All-Star Team	2000

=== NHL ===
Award	Year(s)
NHL YoungStars Game	2003

== Transactions ==
- June 26, 1999 – Drafted in the first round, eighth overall by the New York Islanders in the 1999 NHL entry draft.
- June 24, 2001 – Traded by the New York Islanders with Tim Connolly to the Buffalo Sabres for Michael Peca.
- July 14, 2006 – Traded by the Buffalo Sabres to the Vancouver Canucks for the Canucks' fourth round selection (later traded to the Calgary Flames — Keith Aulie) in the 2007 NHL entry draft.
- September 2, 2009 – Signed as an unrestricted free agent by the Phoenix Coyotes.
- July 3, 2012 – Signed as an unrestricted free agent by the New York Rangers.
- January 2, 2014 – Claimed off of waivers by the Pittsburgh Penguins.

Awards and achievements
Preceded by Tim Connolly	New York Islanders first-round draft pick 1999	Succeeded by Branislav Mezei
