= Sami Salo =

Finnish ice hockey player (born 1974)

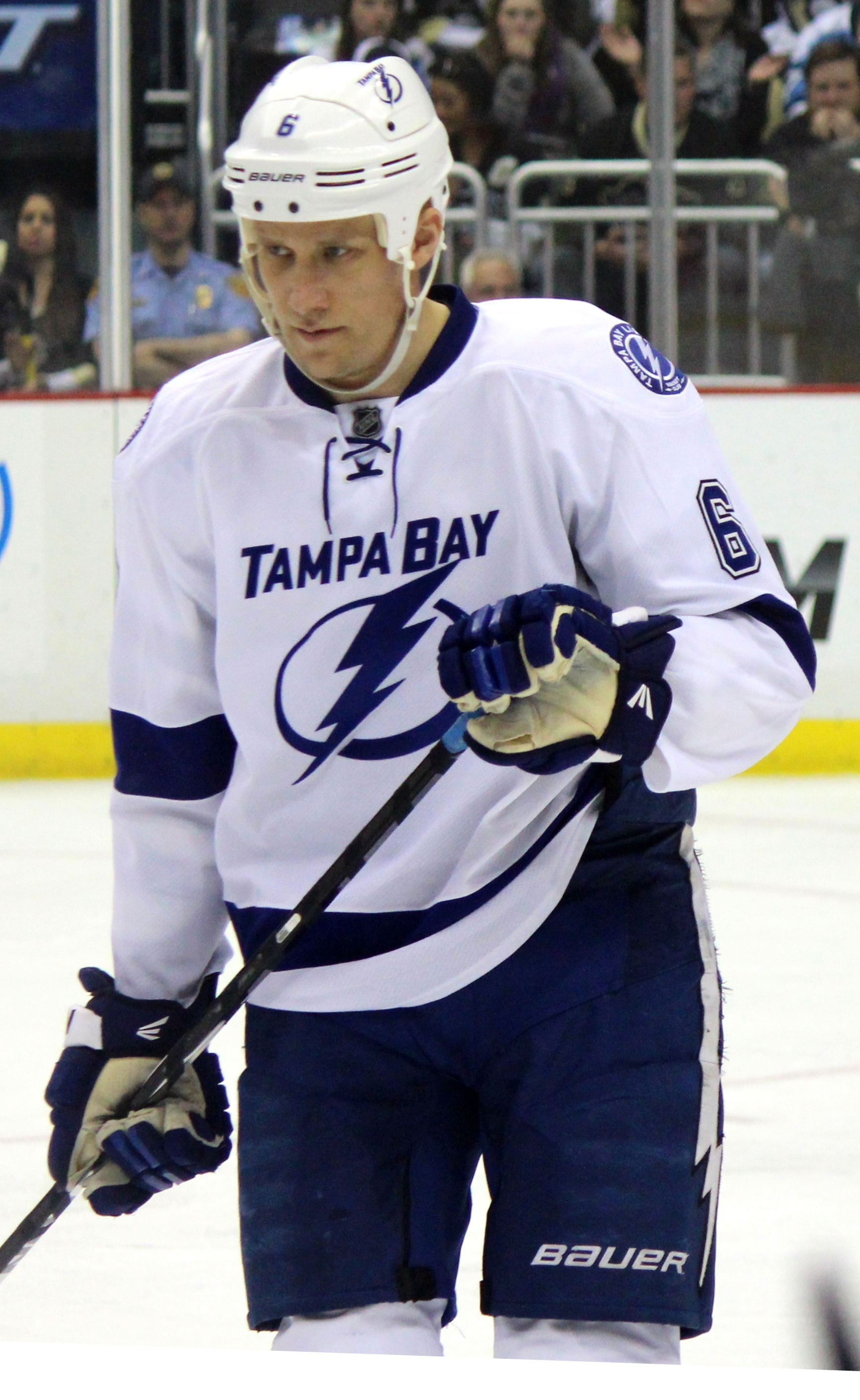
- Salo with the Tampa Bay Lightning in March 2014
- Born: 2 September 1974 (age 52) Turku, Finland
- Height: 6 ft 3 in (191 cm)
- Weight: 212 lb (96 kg; 15 st 2 lb)
- Position: Defence
- Shot: Right
- Played for: TPS; Jokerit; Ottawa Senators; Vancouver Canucks; Frölunda HC; Tampa Bay Lightning
- National team: Finland
- NHL draft: 239th overall, 1996; Ottawa Senators
- Playing career: 1994–2015

Sami Sakari Salo (born 2 September 1974) is a Finnish former professional ice hockey player who was a defenceman in the National Hockey League (NHL). He began his professional career with TPS of the SM-liiga before being selected by the Ottawa Senators with their last pick in the 1996 NHL entry draft.

He joined the Senators in 1998–99 and was selected to the NHL All-Rookie Team. In the 2002 off-season, he was traded to the Vancouver Canucks with whom he recorded three 30-point campaigns. Prior to the 2012–13 NHL season he signed with the Lightning as a free agent. Due to the 2004–05 NHL lockout, Salo played overseas with Frölunda HC of the Swedish Elite League and helped the club capture the Le Mat Trophy as league champions. Internationally, Salo has competed for Finland, appearing in two World Championships, three Winter Olympics and one World Cup. He won silver medals at the 2001 World Championships and the 2006 Winter Olympics, as well as a bronze medal at the 2010 Winter Olympics.

Throughout his career, Salo became infamous for being injury-prone, having suffered over 40 career injuries. Despite his injuries, he was known as a two-way defenceman with a powerful slapshot.

== Playing career ==
=== TPS and Jokerit ===
After developing his skills with the junior club of his hometown, Turku, Finland, Salo turned professional with TPS of the SM-Liiga in 1994–95. He appeared in seven games, recording a goal and two assists in his first season in the SM-Liiga. The following campaign, he recorded a Finnish career-high 14 assists and 21 points over 47 games. In the off-season, Salo was selected by the Ottawa Senators with their last selection in the 1996 NHL entry draft, 239th overall in the ninth round. He remained in Finland for two more seasons upon being drafted. He improved from seven goals to nine in 1996–97. The following season, he transferred from TPS to Jokerit. In his lone season with the Helsinki-based team, he tallied three goals and eight points over 35 games.

=== Ottawa Senators (1998–2002) ===
Following a four-year career in Finland, Salo signed with the Senators in July 1998. He played in the first 3 games of the 1998/99 season before he was assigned to the Detroit Vipers, Ottawa's International Hockey League (IHL) affiliate, due to his first NHL injury and was recalled on 18 November 1998. Twenty-seven games into his rookie campaign, he scored his first NHL goal against Boston Bruins goaltender Byron Dafoe, a game-winner, in a 3–1 win on 21 January 1999. Completing the 1998–99 season with seven goals and 19 points, he was named to the NHL All-Rookie Team. The following season, Salo notched a hat trick in a 6–4 win against the Pittsburgh Penguins on 30 March 1999. His campaign was shortened, however, to 37 games due to injury and he was limited to 14 points. In 2000, he missed two games as he suffered from a snakebite.

Salo continued to be sidelined in 2000–01 with various ailments, including shoulder, foot and knee injuries, as well as the flu. In March 2001, he was also cross-checked in the face by Rick Tocchet of the Philadelphia Flyers, suffering broken teeth and a mild concussion. He finished his third NHL season with 18 points in 31 games.

Before the 2001–02 season began, Salo injured his groin in an exhibition game against the Toronto Maple Leafs in September. In addition to missing the first three games of the season, he was later sidelined for a total of 13 more contests due to separate cases of the flu, a broken finger and back spasms. He recorded 18 points in 66 games. In the proceeding off-season, Salo underwent shoulder surgery. Becoming a free agent, he accepted an $880,000 qualifying offer from the Senators on 31 July 2002. Nearly two months later, he was traded to the Vancouver Canucks in exchange for forward Peter Schaefer on 21 September.

=== Vancouver Canucks (2002–2012) ===
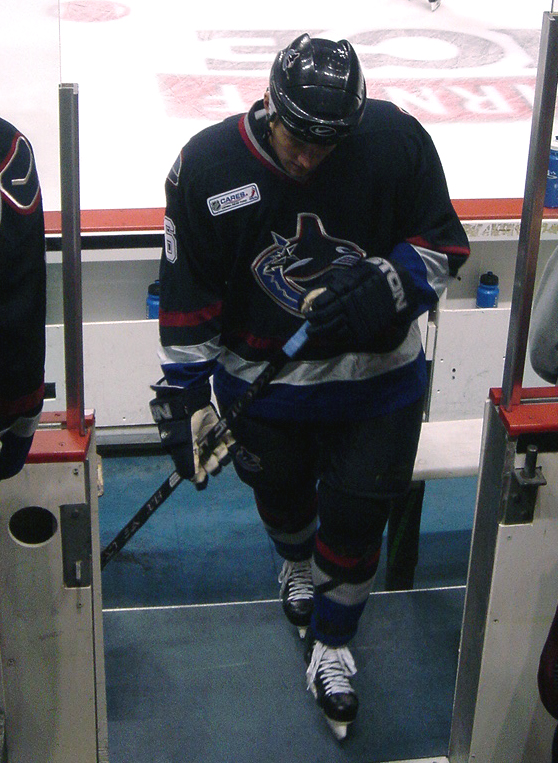
Salo with the Canucks in October 2005

Salo established himself as a top-four defenceman with the Canucks, ranking fourth among team blueliners in average ice time per game during his first season with Vancouver. He also appeared in a career-high 79 games while recording nine goals, 21 assists and 30 points.

The Canucks re-signed him in the 2003 off-season to a two-year, $3.2 million contract. In 2003–04, he recorded seven goals, 19 assists and 26 points in 74 games.

Due to the 2004–05 NHL lockout, Salo went overseas to play for Frölunda HC in the Swedish Elite League. He notched six goals and 14 points in 41 games, helping Frölunda to the league's best regular season record. The club went on to capture the Le Mat Trophy as playoff champions, defeating Färjestads BK four games to one in the finals. Salo assisted on the overtime goal by Niklas Andersson in game five to win the championship. Salo completed the playoffs with a goal and seven points in 14 post-season contests.

As NHL play was set to resume the following season, Salo signed another two-year contract with the Canucks at $1.5 million per season. He was limited to 59 games in the subsequent 2005–06 season, suffering a shoulder injury with the Finnish national team during the 2006 Winter Olympics, colliding with a teammate during a line change. He recorded 10 goals and 33 points with the Canucks, second among team defencemen in scoring. His 23 assists were also a career high.

In 2006–07, Salo sprained his knee in a game against the Minnesota Wild on 2 November 2006. Soon after returning, he sustained nerve damage in his shoulder from a hit against the Edmonton Oilers in December. Towards the end of the season, he suffered a groin injury, sidelining him for five games in March and April. Although he cumulatively missed 15 games, Salo still managed to have a career year, recording personal bests with 14 goals, 23 assists and 37 points. He tied for 10th among league defencemen in goals and ranked first in game-winning goals with six. Late in the season, he avoided his pending unrestricted free agency by re-signing with the Canucks to a four-year, $14 million contract extension on 29 March 2007. The Canucks entered the 2007 playoffs as the third seed. After eliminating the sixth seeded Dallas Stars in the first round, Vancouver was defeated by the second seeded and eventual Stanley Cup champion Anaheim Ducks in five games. Salo missed the first two games of the second round due to the flu. He notched an assist over 10 post-season games.

With an accumulation of injuries over the years, Salo spent the 2007 off-season recovering from chronic groin, back and shoulder problems. Salo was immediately sidelined once more before the start of the 2007–08 season, fracturing his wrist during an intra-squad game in training camp. Shortly after returning, he was hit in the face by a clearing attempt from teammate Alexander Edler during a game against the Nashville Predators on 2 November 2007. The impact from the puck broke his nose and he missed 19 games. In 63 games, Salo recorded 25 points, his lowest output since his 2001–02 season with the Senators. Despite this, he still led all Canucks defencemen in scoring, as all the team's blueliners also suffered injuries over the season.

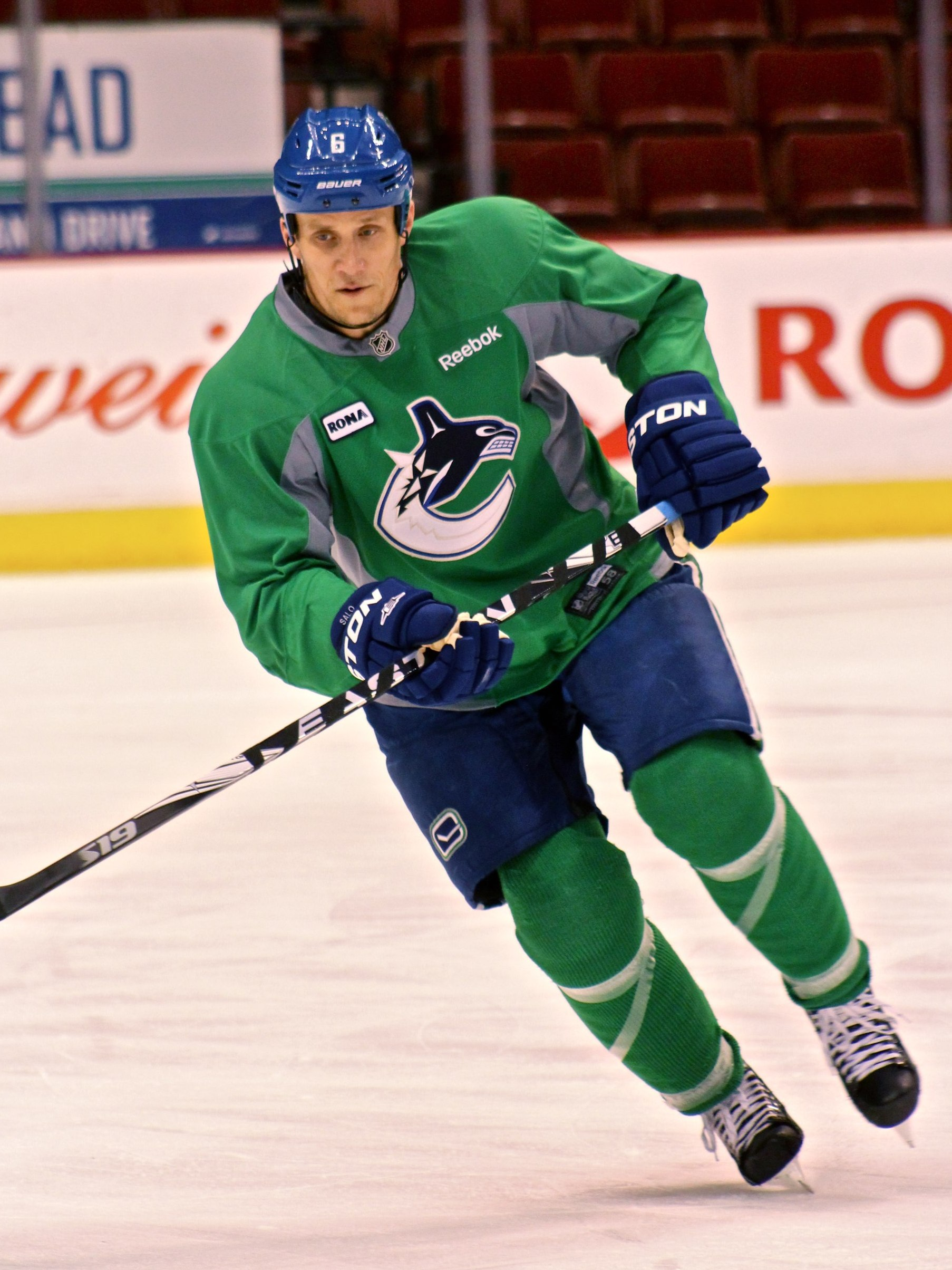
Salo practicing with the Canucks in March 2012

The 2008–09 season began with more time off in November due to separate leg and shoulder injuries. After returning, he was hit into the boards by Edmonton Oilers captain Ethan Moreau on 17 December 2008, and suffered a broken rib. He missed 15 games before returning on 20 January 2009. Limited to 60 games, he managed five goals and 25 points in the regular season. In the ensuing playoffs, Salo scored seven points in seven games, including game-winning goals in both game ones of the first and second rounds against the St. Louis Blues and Chicago Blackhawks, respectively. Salo injured himself in game two of the second round, tearing his gluteus medius muscle while taking a slapshot in which he scored. He played through the injury the following game before missing the next two matches. Following his return, the Canucks were eliminated in the sixth game by the Blackhawks. Salo had three goals and seven points in seven games.

Early in the 2009–10 season, Salo suffered a medial collateral ligament (MCL) sprain to his right knee during a game against the Dallas Stars on 11 October 2009. Sidelined for seven games, he returned by the end of the month. Salo missed additional games during the season to various injuries, ending the campaign with nine goals and 19 assists for 28 points in 68 games. Towards the second half of the season, Salo took on a more defensive role, replacing Willie Mitchell, who was sidelined with a concussion, as the team's primary shutdown defenceman. On 9 May 2010, in game five of the second round of the 2010 playoffs, Salo was hit in the groin by a slapshot from Chicago Blackhawks defenceman Duncan Keith. Needing to be helped off the ice, he was taken to hospital with what was falsely believed to be a ruptured testicle. He played through an undisclosed injury the following game, as the Canucks were eliminated by the eventual Stanley Cup champion Blackhawks by a 5–1 score for a second straight 4–2 series defeat. He completed the playoffs with a goal and five assists for six points in all 12 games.

Playing floorball in the 2010 off-season, Salo tore his achilles tendon on 22 July 2010. After undergoing surgery, he was sidelined for the first four months of the 2010–11 season. The injury was so severe that Salo later admitted thinking his career was over during his rehabilitation. Before returning to the Canucks lineup, he was sent to the team's American Hockey League (AHL) affiliate, the Manitoba Moose, for a conditioning assignment. Making his AHL debut on 4 February 2011, he scored two goals for the Moose in a 3–2 win against the Wilkes-Barre/Scranton Penguins. Salo played two more games for the Moose, going pointless in both, before being called up by the Canucks on 11 February. Salo appeared in 27 games in 2010–11, recording three goals and four assists as the Canucks won their first Presidents' Trophy in franchise history as the best regular season team. During the first and second rounds of the 2011 playoffs, Salo missed four games with a leg injury sustained in game six of the first round. The Canucks eliminated the eighth-seeded and defending Stanley Cup champion Blackhawks along with the fifth-seeded Nashville Predators in the first two rounds to qualify for the Western Conference Finals against the San Jose Sharks. During Game 4 of the series, Salo set a Canucks playoff record for fastest back-to-back goals, scoring 16 seconds apart on a pair of 5-on-3 powerplays. The feat also tied Larry Murphy's NHL record for fastest two power play goals in the playoffs since 1957. (Note: 1957 marks the year in which the NHL rules changed and a power play was ended once the attacking team scored.) Combined with Ryan Kesler's goal a minute and thirty-nine seconds previously, the trio of goals were also the fastest scored in Canucks playoff history at a minute and fifty-five seconds. Vancouver went on to win the game 4–2, while winning the series 4–1 against the second-seeded Sharks. Advancing to the 2011 Stanley Cup Finals, the Canucks were defeated in seven games by the third-seeded Boston Bruins, one win short from winning the Stanley Cup and surrendering a 3–2 series lead along the way.

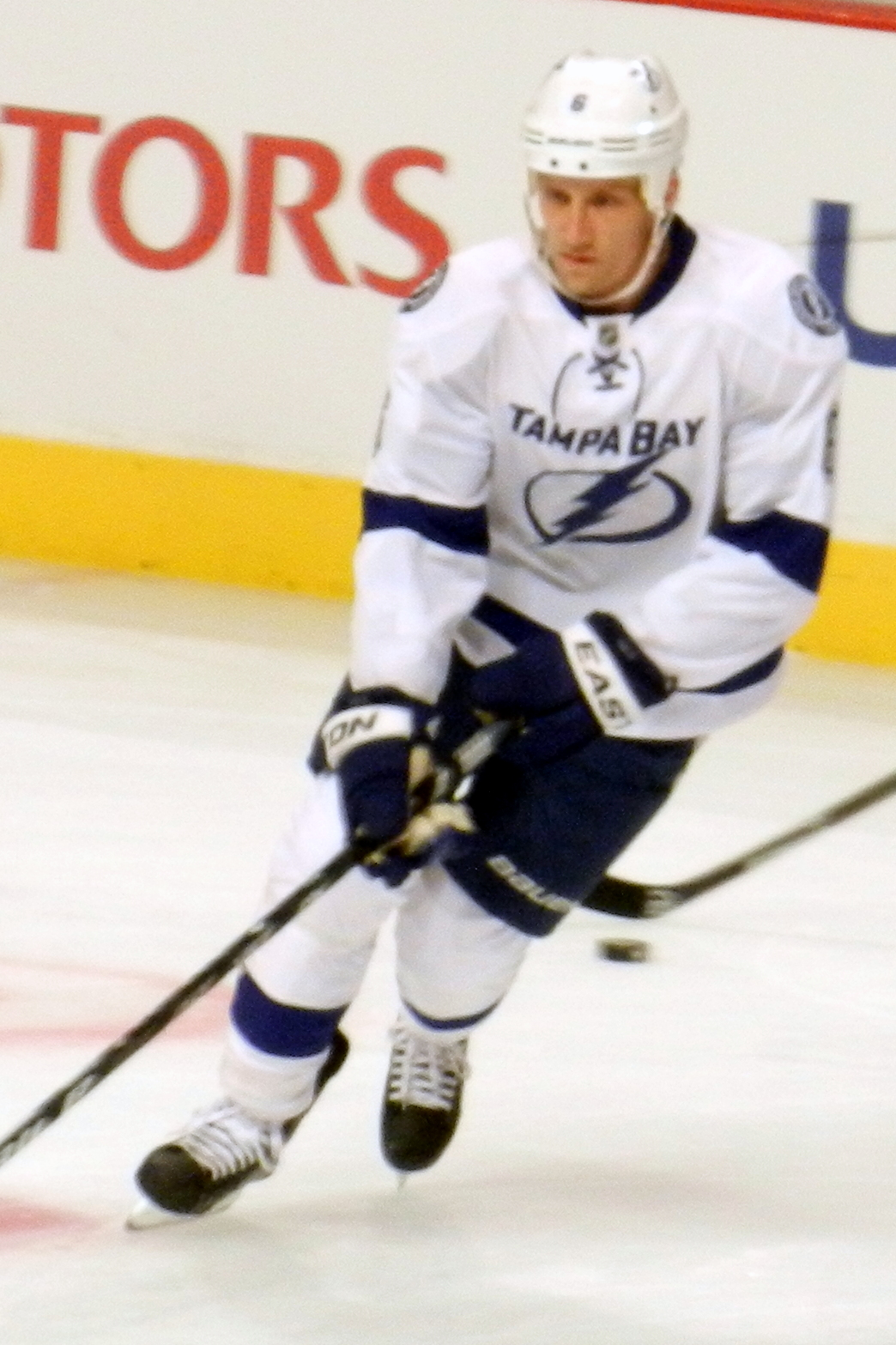
Salo with the Lightning in October 2013

During the 2011 off-season, Salo re-signed with the Canucks to a one-year, $2 million deal on 1 July 2011, prior to becoming an unrestricted free agent. In the first half of the 2011–12 season, Salo suffered a minor groin injury that sidelined him on two separate occasions, costing him three games and one game, respectively. On 7 January 2012, the Canucks and Bruins played against each other for the first time since the 2011 Stanley Cup Finals seven months prior. During the contest, Salo sustained a concussion after a clipping hit from opposing forward Brad Marchand. Salo left the game immediately, while Marchand received a five-minute major and game misconduct; he was later additionally suspended for five games following a hearing with the league. Salo finished the season with nine goals, 16 assists and 25 points in 69 games as the Canucks won their second consecutive Presidents' Trophy before ultimately getting upset in the first round of the 2012 playoffs by the eighth-seeded and eventual Stanley Cup champion Los Angeles Kings.

=== Tampa Bay Lightning (2012–2014) ===
On 1 July 2012, Salo signed a two-year, $7.5 million contract worth $3.75 million per year with the Tampa Bay Lightning as a free agent. When speaking of the signing, general manager Steve Yzerman announced he expected Salo to combine with Eric Brewer to "give our defense some nice veteran leadership for our younger players." He officially announced his retirement from professional hockey on 13 August 2015.

== International play ==
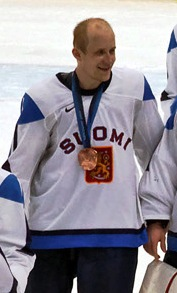
- Salo after receiving his bronze medal at the 2010 Olympics

Medal record

Representing Finland

Ice hockey

Winter Olympics
| Silver medal – second place | 2006 Turin | |
| Bronze medal – third place | 2010 Vancouver | |
| Bronze medal – third place | 2014 Sochi | |

World Cup
| Silver medal – second place | 2004 Toronto | |

World Championships
| Silver medal – second place | 2001 Germany | |

Salo made his international debut with the Finnish national team at the 2001 World Championships in Germany. He recorded an international career-high nine points in nine games, second among tournament defencemen to Finnish teammate Petteri Nummelin. Finland advanced to the gold medal game, where they lost 3–2 to the Czech Republic, earning silver.

On 13 December 2001, Salo was selected to the Finnish national team for the 2002 Winter Olympics in Salt Lake City, along with Senators teammate Jani Hurme. He appeared in four games without registering a point as Finland was defeated by the gold medal-winning Canadians in the quarterfinal by a 2–1 score.

In Salo's next World Championships appearance in 2004, he recorded three assists in seven games. Finland failed to medal, losing their quarterfinal to Canada. Salo assisted on the go-ahead goal in the third period before Canada tied up the score and won 5–4 in overtime. Several months later, at the 2004 World Cup, Salo helped Finland to the final, notching three assists in seven games. For his third straight national team appearance, however, Finland was eliminated by Canada, losing the championship game 3–2.

He made his second Olympics appearance at the 2006 Games in Turin. He recorded four points in six games before suffering a tournament-ending shoulder injury in a collision with teammate Ville Peltonen during a line change in front of the team bench. The injury kept him from playing in the semifinal and gold medal game, where Finland won the silver medal in a 3–2 loss to Sweden. Despite missing two games, Salo ranked second among team defencemen, behind Kimmo Timonen, with a goal and four points in six games. Four years later, Salo competed once again for Finland at the 2010 Winter Olympics in his NHL hometown Vancouver. He recorded two points in six games, while leading all Finnish players in ice time. He scored his lone goal during the bronze-medal game, opening the score against Slovakia in a 5–3 win.

In 2014, Salo competed in his fourth and last Olympic tournament at the 2014 Winter Olympics. Finland won the bronze medal and Salo recorded 1 point in 6 games. In the bronze-medal game, Salo became the last player to play without a visor at the Olympics.

== Playing style ==
Salo is known as a two-way defenceman, capable of being matched up against an opposing team's top players, while also contributing offensively. His offensive game is characterized by his powerful slapshot. He has won numerous hardest shot titles with the Canucks in the team's SuperSkills competitions, clocking one shot at 102.7 miles per hour (163.5 km/h) in 2012. As a result, he is used frequently on the powerplay, being set up by teammates for shots from the point. A well-rounded defenceman, Salo also earns time on the penalty kill.

== Personal life ==
Salo has a wife, Johanna, and three children. From youngest to oldest, they are Peppi, Oliver and Julia. Salo has spent time coaching Oliver, his only son, on his hockey team.

Growing up in Turku, Finland, Salo had aspirations of playing with the Finnish national team, rather than the NHL. He idolized Jari Kurri and was more familiar with other Finnish players, such as Esa Peltonen and Heikki Riihiranta, than he was with any NHL stars.

== Career statistics ==
=== Regular season and playoffs ===
| | | | Regular season | | | | | Playoffs |
| Season | Team | League | GP | G | A | Pts | PIM | GP | G | A | Pts | PIM |
|---|---|---|---|---|---|---|---|---|---|---|---|---|
| 1992–93 | Kiekko–67 | FIN.2 U20 | 21 | 9 | 4 | 13 | 4 | — | — | — | — | — |
| 1993–94 | TPS | FIN U20 | 36 | 7 | 13 | 20 | 16 | 7 | 0 | 1 | 1 | 10 |
| 1994–95 | TPS | FIN U20 | 14 | 1 | 3 | 4 | 6 | — | — | — | — | — |
| 1994–95 | TPS | SM-l | 7 | 1 | 2 | 3 | 6 | 1 | 0 | 0 | 0 | 0 |
| 1994–95 | Kiekko–67 | FIN.2 | 19 | 4 | 2 | 6 | 4 | — | — | — | — | — |
| 1995–96 | TPS | SM-l | 47 | 7 | 14 | 21 | 32 | 11 | 1 | 3 | 4 | 8 |
| 1996–97 | TPS | SM-l | 48 | 9 | 6 | 15 | 10 | 10 | 2 | 3 | 5 | 4 |
| 1997–98 | Jokerit | SM-l | 35 | 3 | 5 | 8 | 10 | 8 | 0 | 1 | 1 | 2 |
| 1998–99 | Ottawa Senators | NHL | 61 | 7 | 12 | 19 | 24 | 4 | 0 | 0 | 0 | 0 |
| 1998–99 | Detroit Vipers | IHL | 5 | 0 | 2 | 2 | 0 | — | — | — | — | — |
| 1999–2000 | Ottawa Senators | NHL | 37 | 6 | 8 | 14 | 2 | 6 | 1 | 1 | 2 | 0 |
| 2000–01 | Ottawa Senators | NHL | 31 | 2 | 16 | 18 | 10 | 4 | 0 | 0 | 0 | 0 |
| 2001–02 | Ottawa Senators | NHL | 66 | 4 | 14 | 18 | 14 | 12 | 2 | 1 | 3 | 4 |
| 2002–03 | Vancouver Canucks | NHL | 79 | 9 | 21 | 30 | 10 | 12 | 1 | 3 | 4 | 0 |
| 2003–04 | Vancouver Canucks | NHL | 74 | 7 | 19 | 26 | 22 | 7 | 1 | 2 | 3 | 2 |
| 2004–05 | Frölunda HC | SEL | 41 | 6 | 8 | 14 | 18 | 14 | 1 | 6 | 7 | 2 |
| 2005–06 | Vancouver Canucks | NHL | 59 | 10 | 23 | 33 | 38 | — | — | — | — | — |
| 2006–07 | Vancouver Canucks | NHL | 67 | 14 | 23 | 37 | 26 | 10 | 0 | 1 | 1 | 4 |
| 2007–08 | Vancouver Canucks | NHL | 63 | 8 | 17 | 25 | 38 | — | — | — | — | — |
| 2008–09 | Vancouver Canucks | NHL | 60 | 5 | 20 | 25 | 26 | 7 | 3 | 4 | 7 | 2 |
| 2009–10 | Vancouver Canucks | NHL | 68 | 9 | 19 | 28 | 18 | 12 | 1 | 5 | 6 | 2 |
| 2010–11 | Manitoba Moose | AHL | 3 | 2 | 0 | 2 | 2 | — | — | — | — | — |
| 2010–11 | Vancouver Canucks | NHL | 27 | 3 | 4 | 7 | 14 | 21 | 3 | 2 | 5 | 2 |
| 2011–12 | Vancouver Canucks | NHL | 69 | 9 | 16 | 25 | 10 | 5 | 0 | 0 | 0 | 2 |
| 2012–13 | Tampa Bay Lightning | NHL | 46 | 2 | 15 | 17 | 16 | — | — | — | — | — |
| 2013–14 | Tampa Bay Lightning | NHL | 71 | 4 | 13 | 17 | 18 | 2 | 0 | 0 | 0 | 0 |
| SM-l totals | | | 137 | 20 | 27 | 47 | 58 | 30 | 3 | 7 | 10 | 14 |
| NHL totals | | | 878 | 99 | 240 | 339 | 286 | 102 | 12 | 19 | 31 | 18 |

=== International ===
| Year | Team | Event | GP | G | A | Pts | PIM |
|---|---|---|---|---|---|---|---|
| 2001 | Finland | WC | 9 | 3 | 6 | 9 | 6 |
| 2002 | Finland | OG | 4 | 0 | 0 | 0 | 0 |
| 2004 | Finland | WC | 7 | 0 | 3 | 3 | 0 |
| 2004 | Finland | WCH | 6 | 0 | 1 | 1 | 2 |
| 2006 | Finland | OG | 6 | 1 | 3 | 4 | 0 |
| 2010 | Finland | OG | 6 | 1 | 1 | 2 | 4 |
| 2014 | Finland | OG | 6 | 0 | 1 | 1 | 0 |
| Senior totals | | | 44 | 5 | 15 | 20 | 12 |

== Awards ==
| Award | Year |
|---|---|
| NHL All-Rookie Team | 1999 |
| Le Mat Trophy (with Frölunda HC) | 2005 |
| Silver medal (with Finland) | 2001 World Championships; 2006 Winter Olympics |
| Bronze medal (with Finland) | 2010 Winter Olympics; 2014 Winter Olympics |

== Transactions ==
- 22 June 1996 - Drafted by Ottawa Senators in the 9th round, 239th overall, in the 1996 NHL entry draft.
- 31 July 2002 - Signed a one-year, $880,000 qualifying offer from the Ottawa Senators.
- 21 September 2002 - Traded to the Vancouver Canucks for Peter Schaefer.
- 17 July 2003 - Re-signed to a two-year, $3.2 million contract with the Vancouver Canucks.
- 15 September 2004 – Signed to a one-year contract with Frölunda HC.
- 14 August 2005 - Re-signed to a two-year contract with the Vancouver Canucks.
- 29 March 2007 - Signed to a four-year, $14-million contract extension with the Vancouver Canucks.
- 1 July 2011 - Re-signed with the Canucks to a one-year, $2 million contract.
- 1 July 2012 - Signed to a 2-year, $7.5 million contract with the Tampa Bay Lightning.
