= 2021–22 NHL suspensions and fines =

The following is a list of all suspensions and fines enforced in the National Hockey League (NHL) during the 2021–22 NHL season. It lists which players or coaches of what team have been punished for which offense and the amount of punishment they have received.

Players' money forfeited due to suspension or fine goes to the Players' Emergency Assistance Fund, while money forfeited by coaches, staff or organizations as a whole goes to the NHL Foundation.

== Suspensions ==
Based on each player's average annual salary, divided by number of days in the season (200) for non-repeat offenders and games (82) for repeat offenders, salary will be forfeited for the term of their suspension.

^{†} - suspension covered at least one 2021 NHL preseason game
^{‡} - suspension covered at least one 2022 postseason game
^{#} - suspension was reduced on appeal
^{R} - Player was considered a repeat offender under the terms of the Collective Bargaining Agreement (player had been suspended in the 18 months prior to this suspension)

Date of incident	Offender	Team(s)	Offense(s)	Date of action	Length	Salary forfeited^{1}^{,}^{2}
June 2, 2021	Mark Scheifele	Winnipeg Jets	Charging Jake Evans.	June 3, 2021	4 games (3 2021 post-season + 1 regular season)^{3}	N/A
September 26, 2021	Ridly Greig	Ottawa Senators	Cross-checking Pierre-Luc Dubois.	September 27, 2021	2 games^{†} (1 preseason + 1 regular season)	$4,470.84
September 26, 2021	Dylan McIlrath	Washington Capitals	Illegal check to the head of Steven Fogarty.	September 27, 2021	4 games^{†} (2 preseason + 2 regular season)	$7,500.00
October 6, 2021	Blake Coleman	Calgary Flames	Boarding Jansen Harkins.	October 7, 2021	2 games^{†} (1 preseason + 1 regular season)	$24,500.00
October 13, 2021	Gabriel Landeskog	Colorado Avalanche	Boarding Kirby Dach.	October 14, 2021	2 games	$70,000.00
October 14, 2021	Dylan Larkin	Detroit Red Wings	Roughing Mathieu Joseph.	October 15, 2021	1 game	$30,500.00
September 22, 2021^{4}	Evander Kane	San Jose Sharks	Violating NHL/NHLPA COVID-19 protocol.	October 18, 2021	21 games^{4}	$1,540,000.00^{2}
October 18, 2021	Pavel Buchnevich^{R}	St. Louis Blues	Head-butting Lawson Crouse.	October 19, 2021	2 games	$141,463.41
October 31, 2021	Cedric Paquette	Montreal Canadiens	Boarding Trevor Zegras.	November 1, 2021	2 games	$9,500.00
November 4, 2021	Mikhail Sergachev	Tampa Bay Lightning	Illegal check to the head of Mitch Marner.	November 5, 2021	2 games	$48,000.00
November 11, 2021	Tucker Poolman	Vancouver Canucks	High-sticking Kiefer Sherwood.	November 12, 2021	2 games	$25,000.00
November 18, 2021	Kevin Labanc	San Jose Sharks	Slew-footing Tyler Bozak.	November 19, 2021	1 game	$23,625.00
November 28, 2021	Brad Marchand	Boston Bruins	Slew-footing Oliver Ekman-Larsson.	November 29, 2021	3 games	$91,875.00
November 27, 2021	Brendan Lemieux	Los Angeles Kings	Biting Brady Tkachuk.	November 30, 2021	5 games	$38,750.00
December 5, 2021	Neal Pionk	Winnipeg Jets	Kneeing Rasmus Sandin.	December 6, 2021	2 games	$58,750.00
December 5, 2021	Jason Spezza	Toronto Maple Leafs	Kneeing Neal Pionk.	December 7, 2021; December 17, 2021	6 games^{#} 4 games^{5}	$22,500.00 $15,000.00
December 18, 2021	Brett Connolly	Chicago Blackhawks	Interference against Tanner Kero.	December 19, 2021	4 games	$70,000.00
January 1, 2022	Sam Bennett^{R}	Florida Panthers	Illegal check to the head of Cedric Paquette.	January 2, 2022	3 games	$161,890.24
January 12, 2022	Chris Wideman	Montreal Canadiens	Head-butting Erik Haula.	January 13, 2022	1 game	$3,750.00
January 13, 2022	Ross Johnston	New York Islanders	Illegal check to the head of A. J. Greer.	January 14, 2022	3 games	$15,000.00
January 18, 2022	Dmitry Orlov	Washington Capitals	Kneeing Nikolaj Ehlers.	January 19, 2022	2 games	$51,000.00
January 25, 2022	Aaron Dell	Buffalo Sabres	Interference against Drake Batherson.	January 26, 2022	3 games	$11,250.00
February 8, 2022	Brad Marchand^{R}	Boston Bruins	Roughing/high-sticking Tristan Jarry.	February 9, 2022	6 games^{6}	$448,170.73
February 8, 2022	Marcus Foligno	Minnesota Wild	Kneeing Adam Lowry.	February 10, 2022	2 games	$31,000.00
February 12, 2022	Austin Watson	Ottawa Senators	Interference against Jack Ahcan.	February 13, 2022	2 games	$15,000.00
March 13, 2022	Auston Matthews	Toronto Maple Leafs	Cross-checking Rasmus Dahlin.	March 14, 2022	2 games	$116,402.50
March 18, 2022	Nino Niederreiter	Carolina Hurricanes	Slashing Axel Jonsson-Fjallby.	March 19, 2022	1 game^{7}	$26,250.00
April 1, 2022	Nick Ritchie	Arizona Coyotes	Slashing Kevin Shattenkirk.	April 2, 2022	1 game	$12,500.00
April 8, 2022	Casey Cizikas	New York Islanders	Boarding Brendan Smith.	April 9, 2022	1 game	$12,500.00
April 10, 2022	Evgeni Malkin	Pittsburgh Penguins	Cross-checking Mark Borowiecki.	April 11, 2022	4 games	$190,000.00
April 16, 2022	Michael Pezzetta	Montreal Canadiens	Illegal check to the head of T.J. Oshie.	April 18, 2022	2 games	$7,500.00
April 25, 2022	Ryan Lomberg	Florida Panthers	Automatic suspension for instigating a fight against Erik Cernak during the final five minutes of a game.	April 25, 2022	1 game	$3,625.00
May 2, 2022	Kyle Clifford	Toronto Maple Leafs	Boarding Ross Colton.	May 3, 2022	1 game^{‡}	N/A
May 10, 2022	Darnell Nurse	Edmonton Oilers	Head-butting Phillip Danault.	May 11, 2022	1 game^{‡}	N/A
June 4, 2022	Evander Kane	Edmonton Oilers	Boarding Nazem Kadri.	June 5, 2022	1 game^{‡}	N/A
Player totals:					97 games^{†‡} (4 preseason + 90 regular) + 3 postseason)	$3,304,772.72

=== Notes ===
1. All figures are in US dollars.
2. Fines generated for games lost due to suspension for off-ice conduct are calculated uniquely and irrespective of repeat offender status.
3. As the Winnipeg Jets were eliminated from the playoffs, the remaining game of Scheifele's suspension was instead made to be served in his first game of the 2021–22 NHL season.
4. While Kane's date of incident was not publicized, the NHL announced an investigation into potential violations of COVID-19 protocol on September 22, 2021. As Kane missed the San Jose Sharks' October 16, 2021 game while the investigation was pending, his 21 game suspension retroactively included that game in his total.
5. Spezza and the NHLPA appealed the suspension on December 8, 2021. On December 17, 2021, NHL Commissioner Gary Bettman announced he had heard the appeal and was reducing the suspension to four games; as Spezza had sat out the previous four Maple Leafs games, he became immediately eligible to return to the lineup.
6. Suspension was appealed by Marchand on February 11, 2022. On February 18, 2022, NHL Commissioner Gary Bettman announced he had heard the appeal and was upholding the original 6 game suspension levied to Marchand.
7. Suspension was appealed by Niederreiter on March 21, 2022. On March 28, 2022, NHL Commissioner Gary Bettman announced he had heard the appeal and was upholding the original 1 game suspension levied to Niederreiter.

== Fines ==
Players can be fined up to 50% of one day's salary, up to a maximum of $10,000.00 for their first offense, and $15,000.00 for any subsequent offenses (player had been fined in the 12 months prior to this fine). Coaches, non-playing personnel, and teams are not restricted to such maximums, though can still be treated as repeat offenders.

Fines for players/coaches fined for diving/embellishment are structured uniquely and are only handed out after non-publicized warnings are given to the player/coach for their first offense. For more details on diving/embellishment fines:

Diving/embellishment specifications
Incident Number^{1}	Player Fine^{2}	Coach Fine^{2}
1	Warning (N/A)	Warning (N/A)
2	$2,000	N/A
3	$3,000	N/A
4	$4,000	N/A
5	$5,000	$2,000
6	$5,000	$3,000
7	$5,000	$4,000
8+	$5,000	$5,000

1. For coach incident totals, each citation issued to a player on his club counts toward his total.
2. All figures are in US dollars.

Fines listed in italics indicate that was the maximum allowed fine.
^{R} - Player was considered a repeat offender under the terms of the Collective Bargaining Agreement (player had been fined in the 12 months prior to this fine)

Date of incident	Offender	Team	Offense	Date of action	Amount^{1}
October 9, 2021	Mark Friedman	Pittsburgh Penguins	Spearing Sean Kuraly.	October 10, 2021	$1,812.50
October 16, 2021	Rasmus Andersson	Calgary Flames	Roughing Kailer Yamamoto.	October 17, 2021	$5,000.00
October 17, 2021	Radek Faksa	Dallas Stars	Slashing Tim Stutzle.	October 18, 2021	$5,000.00
October 19, 2021	Joe Thornton^{R}	Florida Panthers	Slashing Boris Katchouk.	October 20, 2021	$1,875.00
October 23, 2021	Nicolas Aube-Kubel^{R}	Philadelphia Flyers	Kneeing Mason Marchment.	October 24, 2021	$2,687.50
October 23, 2021	Ryan Getzlaf	Anaheim Ducks	Dangerous trip against Joel Eriksson Ek.	October 24, 2021	$1,000.00
October 26, 2021	Team	Chicago Blackhawks	Inadequate procedures and insufficient and untimely response to internal investigation of staff wrongdoings.	October 26, 2021	$2,000,000.00^{2}
October 26, 2021	P.K. Subban	New Jersey Devils	Dangerous trip against Milan Lucic.	October 27, 2021	$5,000.00
November 2, 2021	P.K. Subban^{R}	New Jersey Devils	Dangerous trip against Trevor Zegras.	November 3, 2021	$15,000.00
November 4, 2021	Matthew Tkachuk	Calgary Flames	High-sticking John Klingberg.	November 5, 2021	$5,000.00
November 6, 2021	Derick Brassard	Philadelphia Flyers	Unsportsmanlike conduct against Garnet Hathaway.	November 7, 2021	$2,000.00
November 6, 2021	Tony DeAngelo	Carolina Hurricanes	Diving/embellishment (second citation).^{3}	November 11, 2021	$2,000.00
November 13, 2021	Evan Rodrigues	Pittsburgh Penguins	Dangerous trip against Zach Sanford.	November 14, 2021	$2,500.00
November 13, 2021	Alex Goligoski	Minnesota Wild	High-sticking Jordan Eberle.	November 14, 2021	$5,000.00
November 16, 2021	Brendan Gallagher	Montreal Canadiens	Roughing Barclay Goodrow.	November 17, 2021	$2,500.00
November 16, 2021	Mikael Backlund	Calgary Flames	Cross-checking Travis Konecny.	November 17, 2021	$5,000.00
November 21, 2021	Ryan Hartman^{R}	Minnesota Wild	Slew-footing Ross Colton.	November 22, 2021	$4,250.00
November 24, 2021	Josh Morrissey	Winnipeg Jets	Slashing Alexandre Texier.	November 25, 2021	$5,000.00
November 24, 2021	Max Domi	Columbus Blue Jackets	Unsportsmanlike conduct against Evgeny Svechnikov.	November 25, 2021	$5,000.00
November 24, 2021	Nikita Zaitsev	Ottawa Senators	Cross-checking Timo Meier.	November 25, 2021	$5,000.00
November 26, 2021	Artemi Panarin	New York Rangers	Unsportsmanlike conduct against Brad Marchand.	November 27, 2021	$5,000.00
November 26, 2021	Andrei Svechnikov	Carolina Hurricanes	Kneeing Scott Laughton.	November 27, 2021	$5,000.00
November 28, 2021	Rod Brind'Amour (head coach)	Carolina Hurricanes	Inappropriate conduct against the Washington Capitals.	November 30, 2021	$25,000.00
December 5, 2021	Wayne Simmonds	Toronto Maple Leafs	Cross-checking Jansen Harkins.	December 6, 2021	$2,250.00
December 7, 2021	Ian Cole	Carolina Hurricanes	Kneeing Mark Scheifele.	December 8, 2021	$5,000.00
January 9, 2022	Rick Bowness (head coach)	Dallas Stars	Inappropriate conduct against the St. Louis Blues.	January 10, 2022	$25,000.00
January 13, 2022	Calvin de Haan	Chicago Blackhawks	Dangerous trip against Cole Caufield.	January 14, 2022	$2,500.00
January 18, 2022	Jonathan Drouin	Montreal Canadiens	Cross-checking Tyler Seguin.	January 19, 2022	$5,000.00
January 18, 2022	Phillip Danault	Los Angeles Kings	Dangerous trip against Brayden Point.	January 19, 2022	$5,000.00
January 21, 2022	Cal Foote	Tampa Bay Lightning	Cross-checking Buddy Robinson.	January 22, 2022	$2,125.00
February 15, 2022	Dylan Cozens	Buffalo Sabres	Cross-checking Brock Nelson.	February 16, 2022	$2,235.42
February 15, 2022	John Hynes (head coach)	Nashville Predators	Inappropriate conduct against the Washington Capitals.	February 17, 2022	$25,000.00
February 16, 2022	Adam Ruzicka	Calgary Flames	Elbowing Kevin Shattenkirk.	February 17, 2022	$2,004.17
February 18, 2022	Jamie Benn	Dallas Stars	Unsportsmanlike conduct against MacKenzie Entwistle.	February 19, 2022	$5,000.00
February 19, 2022	Markus Niemelainen	Edmonton Oilers	Cross-checking Kristian Vesalainen.	February 20, 2022	$2,043.75
February 17, 2022	Michael Bunting	Toronto Maple Leafs	Diving/embellishment (second citation).^{4}	February 24, 2022	$2,000.00
March 11, 2022	Marcus Foligno	Minnesota Wild	Kneeing Jakub Voracek.	March 12, 2022	$5,000.00
March 18, 2022	Garnet Hathaway	Washington Capitals	Diving/embellishment (second citation).^{5}	March 24, 2022	$2,000.00
March 29, 2022	Taylor Hall	Boston Bruins	Roughing Ilya Lyubushkin.	March 30, 2022	$5,000.00
March 29, 2022	Tanner Jeannot	Nashville Predators	Kneeing Brady Tkachuk.	March 30, 2022	$2,000.00
April 7, 2022	Colton Sissons	Nashville Predators	Spearing Josh Norris.	April 8, 2022	$2,500.00
April 7, 2022	Evander Kane	Edmonton Oilers	Kneeing Sean Durzi.	April 8, 2022	$5,000.00
April 12, 2022	Ryan Hartman^{R}	Minnesota Wild	Unsportsmanlike conduct against Evander Kane.	April 13, 2021	$4,250.00
April 17, 2022	Mathew Barzal^{R}	New York Islanders	Unsportsmanlike conduct against Mitch Marner.	April 18, 2022	$2,500.00
April 21, 2022	Kyle Clifford	Toronto Maple Leafs	High-Sticking Corey Perry.	April 22, 2022	$2,500.00
April 21, 2022	Wayne Simmonds^{R}	Toronto Maple Leafs	Charging Mikhail Sergachev.	April 22, 2022	$2,250.00
April 23, 2022	Arthur Kaliyev	Los Angeles Kings	Cross-checking Josh Mahura.	April 24, 2022	$2,235.42
April 24, 2022	Andrew Brunette (head coach)	Florida Panthers	Automatic fine for Ryan Lomberg instigating a fight during the final five minutes of a game.	April 25, 2022	$10,000.00
April 29, 2022	Logan O'Connor	Colorado Avalanche	Cross-checking Dmitry Kulikov.	April 30, 2022	$1,812.50
April 29, 2022	Kurtis MacDermid	Colorado Avalanche	Kneeing Marcus Foligno.	April 30, 2022	$2,187.50
May 2, 2022	Pat Maroon^{R}	Tampa Bay Lightning	Unsportsmanlike conduct against Morgan Rielly.	May 3, 2022	$2,250.00
May 2, 2022	Corey Perry	Tampa Bay Lightning	Unsportsmanlike conduct against Wayne Simmonds.	May 3, 2022	$2,500.00
May 2, 2022	Wayne Simmonds^{R}	Toronto Maple Leafs	Unsportsmanlike conduct against Victor Hedman.	May 3, 2022	$2,250.00
May 2, 2022	Jared Spurgeon	Minnesota Wild	Cross-checking Pavel Buchnevich.	May 3, 2022	$5,000.00
May 4, 2022	Brad Marchand	Boston Bruins	Slashing Pyotr Kochetkov.	May 5, 2022	$5,000.00
May 4, 2022	Derek Forbort	Boston Bruins	High-sticking Teuvo Teravainen.	May 5, 2022	$5,000.00
May 7, 2022	Jamie Benn^{R}	Dallas Stars	High-sticking Andrew Mangiapane.	May 8, 2022	$5,000.00
May 7, 2022	Evgeny Kuznetsov	Washington Capitals	High-sticking Noel Acciari.	May 8, 2022	$5,000.00
May 9, 2022	Jamie Benn^{R}	Dallas Stars	Tripping Trevor Lewis.	May 10, 2022	$5,000.00
May 10, 2022	Zack Kassian	Edmonton Oilers	Cross-checking Sean Durzi.	May 11, 2022	$5,000.00
May 14, 2022	Charlie McAvoy	Boston Bruins	Tripping Brady Skjei.	May 15, 2022	$5,000.00
May 14, 2022	Brendan Smith	Carolina Hurricanes	Elbowing David Pastrnak.	May 15, 2022	$2,000.00
May 17, 2022	Ben Chiarot	Florida Panthers	Head-butting Ross Colton.	May 18, 2022	$5,000.00
May 22, 2022	Brandon Hagel	Tampa Bay Lightning	Boarding Eetu Luostarinen.	May 23, 2022	$3,750.00
May 23, 2022	David Perron	St. Louis Blues	Cross-checking Nazem Kadri.	May 24, 2022	$5,000.00
June 2, 2022	Zack Kassian^{R}	Edmonton Oilers	Unsportsmanlike conduct against Bowen Byram.	June 3, 2022	$2,500.00
Totals:					$2,315,268.76

=== Notes ===
1. All figures are in US dollars.
2. While club fines typically go to the NHL Foundation, $1,000,000.00 of the fine will be redirected to fund local organizations in and around the Chicago community that provide counseling and training for, and support and assistance to, survivors of sexual and other forms of abuse.
3. DeAngelo was issued his first citation following an incident on October 31, 2021.
4. Bunting was issued his first citation following an incident on November 16, 2021.
5. Hathaway was issued his first citation following an incident on February 24, 2022.

== See also ==
- 2020–21 NHL suspensions and fines
- 2022–23 NHL suspensions and fines
- 2021 in sports
- 2022 in sports
- 2021–22 NHL season
- 2021–22 NHL transactions
