= Michael Peca =

Canadian ice hockey player (born 1974)

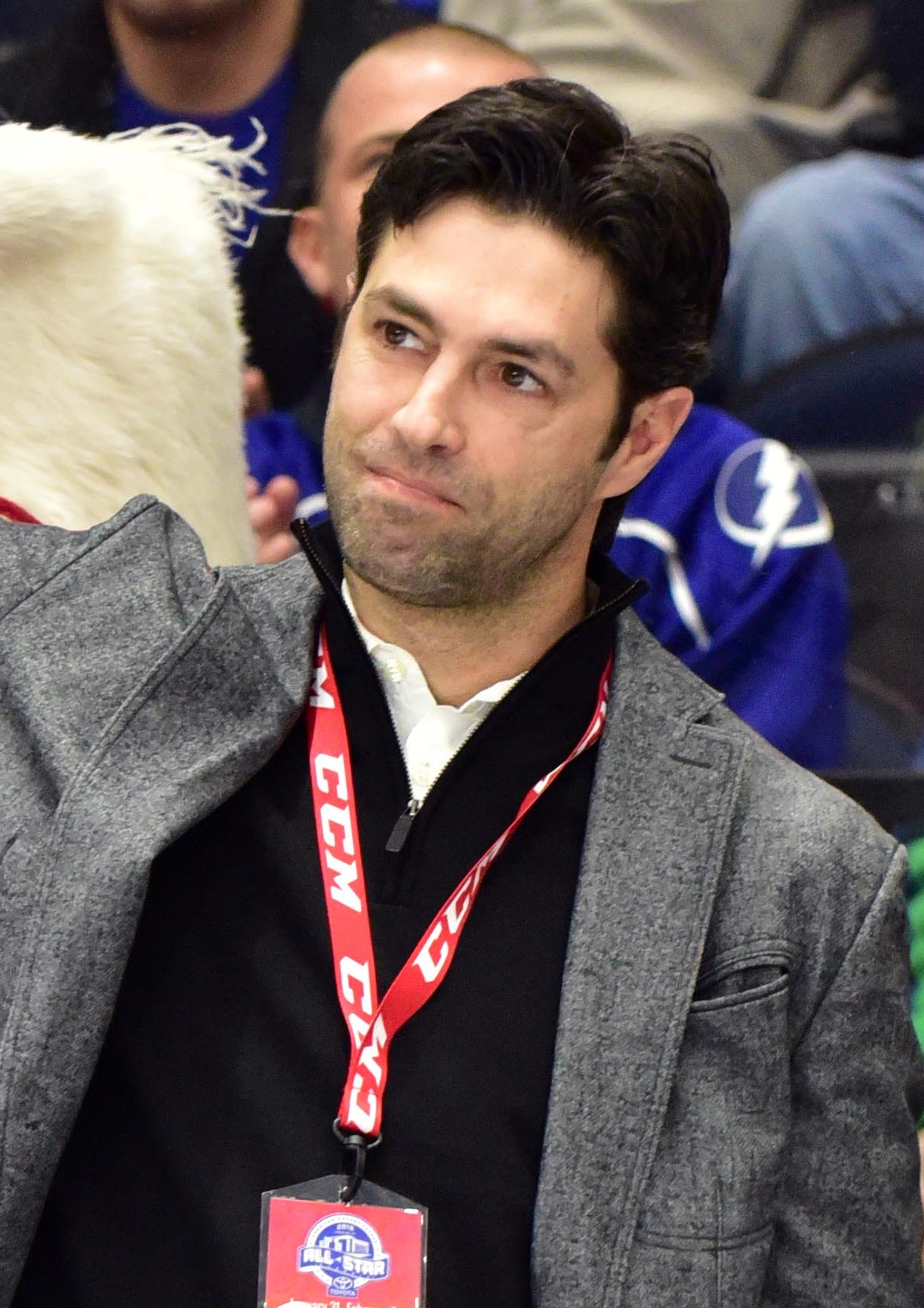
- Peca in 2016
- Born: March 26, 1974 (age 52) Toronto, Ontario, Canada
- Height: 5 ft 11 in (180 cm)
- Weight: 190 lb (86 kg; 13 st 8 lb)
- Position: Centre
- Shot: Right
- Played for: Vancouver Canucks; Buffalo Sabres; New York Islanders; Edmonton Oilers; Toronto Maple Leafs; Columbus Blue Jackets
- National team: Canada
- NHL draft: 40th overall, 1992; Vancouver Canucks
- Playing career: 1993–2009
Medal record
Representing Canada
Ice hockey
Olympic Games
| Gold medal – first place | 2002 Salt Lake City |
World Junior Championships
| Gold medal – first place | 1994 Czech Republic |

Michael Anthony Peca (born March 26, 1974) is a Canadian former professional ice hockey forward who played in the National Hockey League (NHL) for the Vancouver Canucks, Buffalo Sabres, New York Islanders, Edmonton Oilers, Toronto Maple Leafs, and the Columbus Blue Jackets. After retiring as a player, he began a coaching career culminating in NHL assistant coach positions for the Washington Capitals, New York Rangers, and currently the Chicago Blackhawks.

== Playing career ==
Peca began his junior career with the Sudbury Wolves of the Ontario Hockey League (OHL) after they selected him in the first round of the 1990 player draft. He was traded to the Ottawa 67's where he blossomed into one of the league's top offensive players. He was drafted in the second round, 40th overall, by the Vancouver Canucks in the 1992 NHL entry draft. He made his NHL debut with the Canucks in the 1993–94 season, playing four games before cracking the lineup as a regular in the lockout-shortened 1994–95 season. He was then traded to the Buffalo Sabres during the 1995 NHL entry draft as part of a package that sent Alexander Mogilny from Buffalo to Vancouver.

Peca twice won the Frank J. Selke Trophy for being the best defensive forward, in 1996–97 and 2001–02. He captained the Buffalo Sabres to the Stanley Cup Finals in 1999. His nickname was "Captain Crunch" because of his penchant for delivering bone-crushing open ice hits. During the 1997–98 season Peca was suspended three games by the NHL for an illegal hit on Vancouver Canucks defenseman Mattias Öhlund on March 26, 1998.

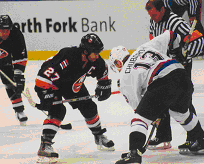
Peca (left) with the New York Islanders in 2003

For the 2000–01 season, Peca and the Buffalo Sabres could not agree on a contract. Peca went without a contract the entire season. Peca was later traded to the New York Islanders in exchange for Tim Connolly and Taylor Pyatt, where he led the Islanders to their first playoff berth in seven years. Peca was hip-checked by Toronto Maple Leafs' Darcy Tucker during the 2002 Stanley Cup playoffs in game five of the first round. The check blew out Peca's MCL and ACL on his left knee, ending his season and delaying his entry into the 2002–03 season. No penalty was assessed, but the NHL made clipping illegal as a result of the incident.

Peca was acquired by the Edmonton Oilers in a trade with the Islanders in exchange for Mike York. He was part of the Cinderella Edmonton Oiler team that made a run to the Stanley Cup Finals. Peca had six goals and five assists in the 2006 playoffs.

On July 18, 2006, the Toronto Maple Leafs announced that they had signed Peca as a free agent to a one-year, $2.5 million contract for the 2006–07 season, making Tucker and Peca teammates. During a game against the Chicago Blackhawks on December 22, 2006, Peca collided with Chicago defenceman Jim Vandermeer with 5:17 left in the first period. Vandermeer was assessed a minor penalty and a game misconduct for the hit. Peca sustained a fractured tibia at the base of his right knee and suffered significant ligament damage, and missed the remainder of the 2006–07 season.

On August 21, 2007, Peca signed a one-year contract with the Columbus Blue Jackets. On October 11, 2008, he received an indefinite suspension (later reduced to a five-game suspension) after grabbing referee Greg Kimmerly's arm in Columbus' first game of the 2008–09 season.

On January 19, 2010, through the National Hockey League Players' Association (NHLPA), Peca announced his retirement from professional hockey.

== International play ==
Peca was first selected to represent Canada at the 1994 World Junior Ice Hockey Championships, capturing the gold medal. He captained the senior Canadian team at the 2001 World Championships in Germany before he was selected as a member of the gold medal-winning Canadian ice hockey team at the 2002 Winter Olympics in Salt Lake City.

== Coaching career ==
Beginning in the 2012–13 season, Peca was named head coach of the Buffalo Jr. Sabres of the Ontario Junior Hockey League (OJHL), where he coached through the 2013–14 season. After the 2012–13 season, he was named OJHL Coach of the Year. In his two years coaching, he had 66 wins in 108 regular season games. Michael Peca served as head coach of the Bantam Major Jr. Sabres in addition to his duties as general manager and director of hockey operations for the Buffalo Jr. Sabres.

On February 10, 2021, Peca was hired by the Washington Capitals to be a player development coach working with the "taxi squad" players for the 2020–21 season. In 2021, he was hired by the Buffalo Sabres as an assistant coach with their American Hockey League affiliate, the Rochester Americans.

Peca was announced as an assistant coach with the Rangers on June 20, 2023, joining under new head coach Peter Laviolette. On May 27, 2025, he was hired as an assistant coach for the Chicago Blackhawks under Jeff Blashill.

== Personal life ==
Michael Peca's hometown is Toronto, Ontario, but he moved to Ottawa to attend Canterbury High School. Peca and his wife, Kristin Herzog, now live in Getzville, New York, with their two children.

== Career statistics ==
=== Regular season and playoffs ===
| | | | Regular season | | | | | Playoffs |
| Season | Team | League | GP | G | A | Pts | PIM | GP | G | A | Pts | PIM |
|---|---|---|---|---|---|---|---|---|---|---|---|---|
| 1990–91 | Sudbury Wolves | OHL | 62 | 14 | 27 | 41 | 24 | 5 | 1 | 0 | 1 | 7 |
| 1991–92 | Sudbury Wolves | OHL | 39 | 16 | 34 | 50 | 61 | — | — | — | — | — |
| 1991–92 | Ottawa 67's | OHL | 27 | 8 | 17 | 25 | 32 | 11 | 6 | 10 | 16 | 6 |
| 1992–93 | Ottawa 67's | OHL | 55 | 38 | 64 | 102 | 80 | — | — | — | — | — |
| 1992–93 | Hamilton Canucks | AHL | 9 | 6 | 3 | 9 | 11 | — | — | — | — | — |
| 1993–94 | Ottawa 67's | OHL | 55 | 50 | 63 | 113 | 101 | 17 | 7 | 22 | 29 | 30 |
| 1993–94 | Vancouver Canucks | NHL | 4 | 0 | 0 | 0 | 2 | — | — | — | — | — |
| 1994–95 | Syracuse Crunch | AHL | 35 | 10 | 24 | 34 | 75 | — | — | — | — | — |
| 1994–95 | Vancouver Canucks | NHL | 33 | 6 | 6 | 12 | 30 | 5 | 0 | 1 | 1 | 8 |
| 1995–96 | Buffalo Sabres | NHL | 68 | 11 | 20 | 31 | 67 | — | — | — | — | — |
| 1996–97 | Buffalo Sabres | NHL | 79 | 20 | 29 | 49 | 80 | 10 | 0 | 2 | 2 | 8 |
| 1997–98 | Buffalo Sabres | NHL | 61 | 18 | 22 | 40 | 57 | 13 | 3 | 2 | 5 | 8 |
| 1998–99 | Buffalo Sabres | NHL | 82 | 27 | 29 | 56 | 81 | 21 | 5 | 8 | 13 | 18 |
| 1999–2000 | Buffalo Sabres | NHL | 73 | 20 | 21 | 41 | 67 | 5 | 0 | 1 | 1 | 4 |
| 2001–02 | New York Islanders | NHL | 80 | 25 | 35 | 60 | 62 | 5 | 1 | 0 | 1 | 2 |
| 2002–03 | New York Islanders | NHL | 66 | 13 | 29 | 42 | 43 | 5 | 0 | 0 | 0 | 4 |
| 2003–04 | New York Islanders | NHL | 76 | 11 | 29 | 40 | 71 | 5 | 0 | 0 | 0 | 6 |
| 2005–06 | Edmonton Oilers | NHL | 71 | 9 | 14 | 23 | 56 | 24 | 6 | 5 | 11 | 20 |
| 2006–07 | Toronto Maple Leafs | NHL | 35 | 4 | 11 | 15 | 60 | — | — | — | — | — |
| 2007–08 | Columbus Blue Jackets | NHL | 65 | 8 | 26 | 34 | 64 | — | — | — | — | — |
| 2008–09 | Columbus Blue Jackets | NHL | 71 | 4 | 18 | 22 | 58 | 4 | 0 | 0 | 0 | 2 |
| NHL totals | | | 864 | 176 | 289 | 465 | 798 | 97 | 15 | 19 | 34 | 80 |

=== International ===
| Year | Team | Event | Result | GP | G | A | Pts | PIM |
|---|---|---|---|---|---|---|---|---|
| 1994 | Canada | WJC | 1st place, gold medalist(s) | 7 | 2 | 2 | 4 | 8 |
| 2001 | Canada | WC | 5th | 3 | 1 | 3 | 4 | 0 |
| 2002 | Canada | OG | 1st place, gold medalist(s) | 6 | 0 | 2 | 2 | 2 |
| Junior totals | | | | 7 | 2 | 2 | 4 | 6 |
| Senior totals | | | | 9 | 1 | 5 | 6 | 2 |

== Awards and honours ==
| Award | Year |
|---|---|
NHL
| Frank J. Selke Trophy | 1997, 2002 |

Sporting positions
| Preceded by Kenny Jönsson | New York Islanders captain 2001–04 | Succeeded by Alexei Yashin |
| Preceded by Pat LaFontaine | Buffalo Sabres captain 1997–2000 | Succeeded by Stu Barnes |
Awards
| Preceded by Sergei Fedorov | Winner of the Frank J. Selke Trophy; 1997 | Succeeded by Jere Lehtinen |
| Preceded by John Madden | Winner of the Frank J. Selke Trophy; 2002 | Succeeded by Jere Lehtinen |
