= Tim Connolly =

American ice hockey player (born 1981)

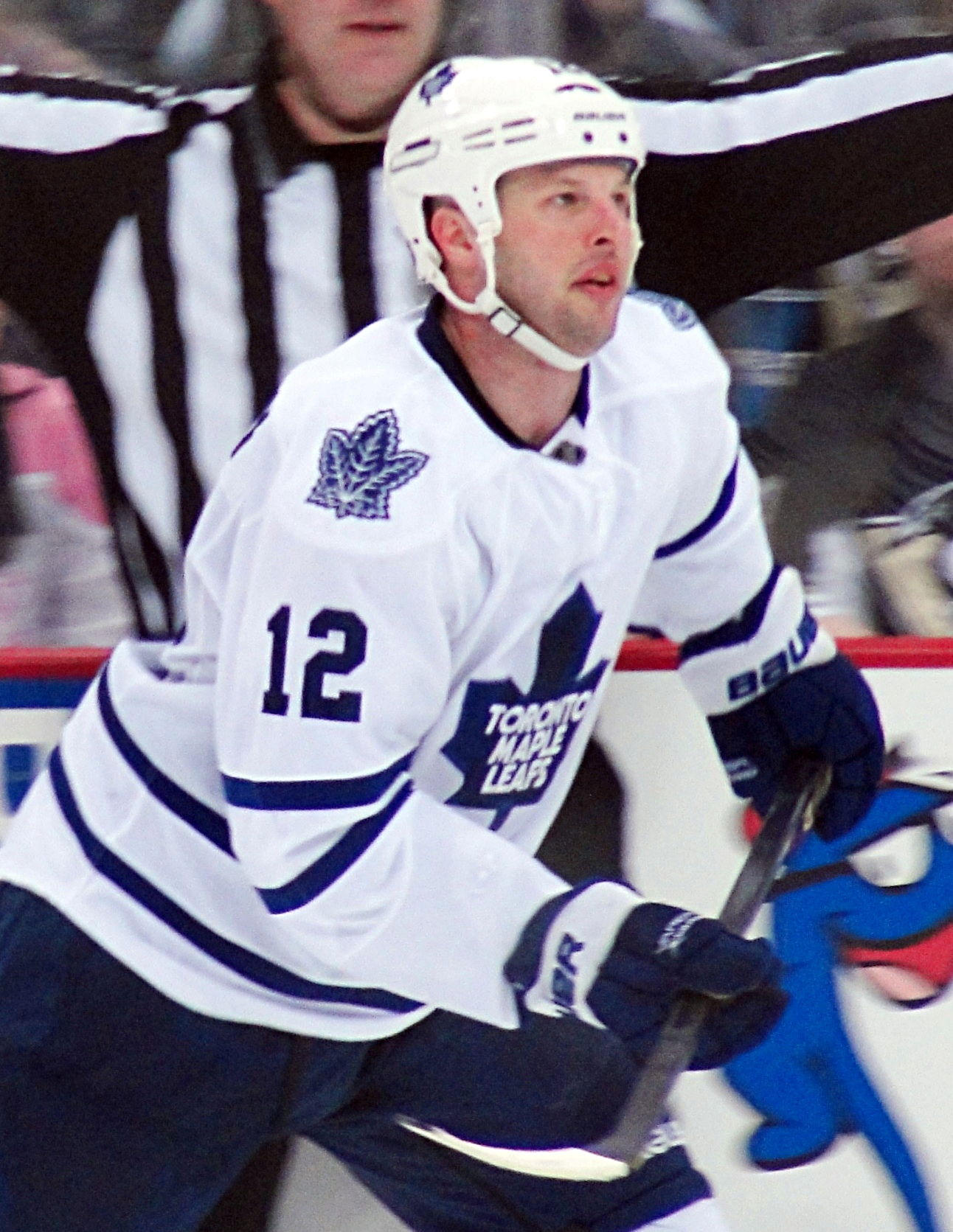
- Connolly with the Toronto Maple Leafs in 2012
- Born: May 7, 1981 (age 45) Baldwinsville, New York, U.S.
- Height: 6 ft 1 in (185 cm)
- Weight: 190 lb (86 kg; 13 st 8 lb)
- Position: Center
- Shot: Right
- Played for: New York Islanders; Buffalo Sabres; Toronto Maple Leafs
- National team: United States
- NHL draft: 5th overall, 1999; New York Islanders
- Playing career: 1999–2013

Timothy L. Connolly (born May 7, 1981) is an American former professional ice hockey player who played 11 seasons in the National Hockey League (NHL) for the New York Islanders, Buffalo Sabres, and Toronto Maple Leafs.

== Playing career ==
=== Amateur ===
As a youth, Connolly played in the 1993, 1994 and 1995 Quebec International Pee-Wee Hockey Tournaments with a minor ice hockey team from Syracuse, New York.

Connolly played for the Erie Otters of the Ontario Hockey League (OHL) for two seasons, beginning in 1997–98. After recording 68 points in 46 games in his second OHL season, he was drafted fifth overall by the New York Islanders in the 1999 NHL entry draft.

=== New York Islanders ===
Connolly bypassed the minor leagues and joined the Islanders for the 1999–2000 season and recorded 31 points in 81 games. He recorded 41 points in 82 games the following season.

On June 24, 2001, at the NHL entry draft, Connolly and Taylor Pyatt were traded by the Islanders to the Buffalo Sabres for captain Michael Peca, who sat out the entire previous season due to a contract impasse.

=== Buffalo Sabres ===
After missing only three regular season games total in his first four seasons in the league, injuries began to plague Connolly's career beginning in 2003–04. He missed the entire season with post-concussion syndrome after suffering a concussion as a result of a hit by Scott Nichol in a pre-season game versus the Chicago Blackhawks, a hit that teammate Daniel Brière claimed was dirty. During the 2004–05 NHL lockout, he played the second half of the season with SC Langnau in the Swiss Nationalliga A.

After two years away, Connolly returned for the 2005–06 season and experienced a breakout with 55 points in 63 games to help Buffalo to the fourth seed in the Eastern Conference. In the 2006 playoffs, he recorded 11 points in 8 games, including the game-tying goal with 10.7 seconds left in game one of the second round series against the Ottawa Senators (which Buffalo won 7–6 in overtime). However, in game two, Connolly was injured after a hard hit by Peter Schaefer and missed the rest of the playoffs. The Sabres advanced to the Eastern Conference Final but suffered a slew of injuries on defense and fell to the eventual Stanley Cup champion Carolina Hurricanes in seven games.

Connolly missed the first 80 games of the 2006–07 season with what was originally believed to be post-concussion syndrome. However, he revealed in 2020 that the injury had been misdiagnosed and was actually a herniated disc. He returned to action on April 7, 2007, against the Washington Capitals, recording 13 minutes of ice time and scoring a goal; he was named second star for the game, which the Sabres won, 2–0. He appeared in all 16 games for the Sabres in the 2007 playoffs, scoring nine assists. Buffalo fell in the Eastern Conference Final once again, this time to the Senators.

Connolly had bone spur problems with his hip all throughout the 2007–08 season and had season-ending surgery to have them removed on March 21, 2008, after he had recorded 40 points in 48 games. Though known for his puck-handling skills, he was also criticized for playing with his head down, something that was frequently linked to his injury problems.

The 2008–09 season saw the continuation of Connolly's injury problems. He began the season with two cracked vertebrae from a stick-butt to the back in a pre-season game, which forced him to miss the first 10 games of the regular season. After five games, in which he registered six points, he suffered a broken rib from a devastating hit by the St. Louis Blues' Keith Tkachuk. Despite playing through the pain in the next game, the injury subsequently pulled Connolly out of the lineup once again. On January 9, 2009, Connolly returned to the lineup to finish the season with 47 points in 48 games.

On March 4, 2009, at the NHL Trade Deadline, Connolly was re-signed by the Buffalo Sabres to a two-year, $9 million contract. In 2009–10, Connolly had a career-high 65 points in 73 regular season games, but was limited to just one point in the postseason as Buffalo fell in the opening round to the lower-seeded Boston Bruins. He recorded 42 points in 68 games the following season.

In Game 6 of the opening round of the 2011 playoffs vs. Philadelphia, Connolly was hit from behind by Flyers forward Mike Richards and went face first into the boards. Richards was penalized on the play but was not suspended by the NHL. Connolly left the game and did not appear again in the series, which Buffalo lost in seven games. It proved to be his last appearance with the Sabres, who opted not to re-sign him that offseason.

=== Toronto Maple Leafs ===
On July 2, 2011, Connolly was signed as an unrestricted free agent by the Toronto Maple Leafs to a two-year, $9.5 million contract.

On November 7, 2011, it was reported that Connolly was injured again, this time with an upper-body injury, and would miss between 10 days and two weeks.

On January 17, 2013, in the final year of his contract with the Maple Leafs and prior to the lockout-shortened 2012–13 season, Connolly was placed on waivers. Upon clearing the following day it was announced that Connolly would start the season with the Leafs' top minor league affiliate, the Toronto Marlies of the American Hockey League (AHL).

== Career statistics ==
=== Regular season and playoffs ===
			Regular season					Playoffs
Season	Team	League	GP	G	A	Pts	PIM	GP	G	A	Pts	PIM
1996–97	Syracuse Jr. Crunch	MetJHL	50	42	62	104	34	—	—	—	—	—
1997–98	Erie Otters	OHL	59	30	32	62	32	7	1	6	7	6
1998–99	Erie Otters	OHL	46	34	34	68	50	—	—	—	—	—
1999–2000	New York Islanders	NHL	81	14	20	34	44	—	—	—	—	—
2000–01	New York Islanders	NHL	82	10	31	41	42	—	—	—	—	—
2001–02	Buffalo Sabres	NHL	82	10	35	45	34	—	—	—	—	—
2002–03	Buffalo Sabres	NHL	80	12	13	25	32	—	—	—	—	—
2004–05	SC Langnau	NLA	16	7	3	10	14	—	—	—	—	—
2005–06	Buffalo Sabres	NHL	63	16	39	55	28	8	5	6	11	0
2006–07	Buffalo Sabres	NHL	2	1	0	1	2	16	0	9	9	4
2007–08	Buffalo Sabres	NHL	48	7	33	40	8	—	—	—	—	—
2008–09	Buffalo Sabres	NHL	48	18	29	47	22	—	—	—	—	—
2009–10	Buffalo Sabres	NHL	73	17	48	65	28	6	0	1	1	2
2010–11	Buffalo Sabres	NHL	68	13	29	42	20	6	0	2	2	2
2011–12	Toronto Maple Leafs	NHL	70	13	23	36	40	—	—	—	—	—
2012–13	Toronto Marlies	AHL	28	5	7	12	23	6	0	1	1	8
NHL totals			697	131	300	431	300	36	5	18	23	8

=== International ===
Year	Team	Event	GP	G	A	Pts	PIM
1999	United States	WJC	6	1	0	1	8
2001	United States	WC	9	3	4	7	4
Junior totals			6	1	0	1	8
Senior totals			9	3	4	7	4

Awards and achievements
Preceded by Mike Rupp	New York Islanders first-round draft pick 1999	Succeeded by Taylor Pyatt
