= Frank J. Selke Trophy =

National Hockey League players' award

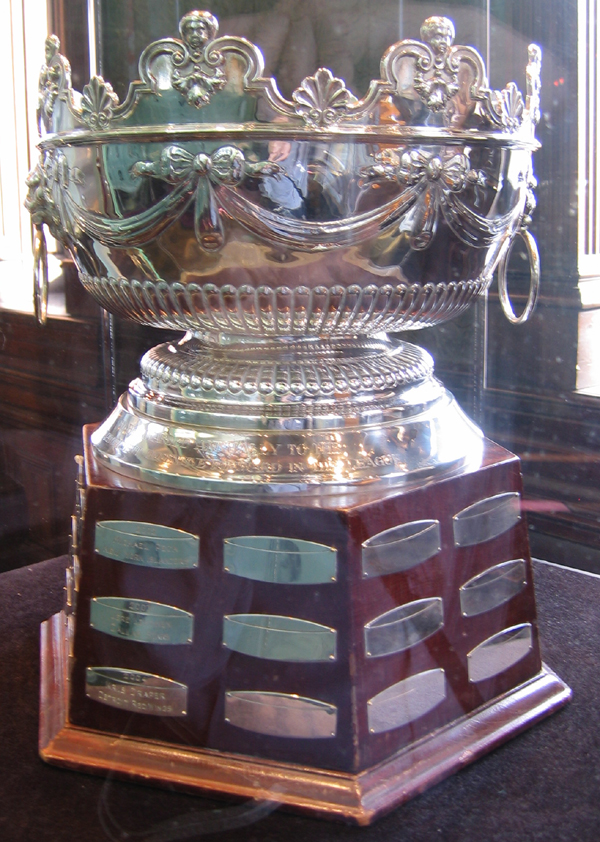
- Sport: Ice hockey
- Awarded for: National Hockey League forward who demonstrates the most skill in the defensive component of the game

History
- First award: 1977–78 NHL season
- First winner: Bob Gainey
- Most wins: Patrice Bergeron (6)
- Most recent: Nick Suzuki; Montreal Canadiens

The Frank J. Selke Trophy, or simply the Selke Trophy, is awarded annually to the National Hockey League forward who demonstrates the most skill in the defensive component of the game. The winner is selected by a poll of the Professional Hockey Writers' Association following the regular season. Named after Frank J. Selke, former general manager of the Toronto Maple Leafs and Montreal Canadiens, the trophy has been awarded 46 times to 28 different players since the 1977–78 NHL season. It is currently held by Montreal Canadiens centre Nick Suzuki.

== History ==
The trophy was first awarded at the end of the 1977–78 NHL season. It was named after Frank J. Selke, former general manager of the Toronto Maple Leafs and Montreal Canadiens. The Selke Trophy was the fifth and last of the major NHL awards to be introduced that have been named after General Managers and owners of the Original Six teams, the other awards being the Art Ross Trophy, James Norris Memorial Trophy, Conn Smythe Trophy, and Jack Adams Award.

The first recipient was Bob Gainey of the Canadiens, who won the trophy the first four years it was given. Patrice Bergeron of the Boston Bruins has won it more times than any other player, with six wins. Guy Carbonneau, Jere Lehtinen, Pavel Datsyuk and Aleksander Barkov are tied for the third-most wins, with three apiece.

The Montreal Canadiens have won the trophy the most times, with 8 awards. The team with the greatest number of unique winners are the Red Wings with 4—Sergei Fedorov (twice), Steve Yzerman, Kris Draper, and Datsyuk (three times)—all coming since 1994.

There has been only one instance in which a Selke Trophy winner was also awarded the Hart Memorial Trophy for Most Valuable Player when Sergei Fedorov captured both trophies during the 1993–94 NHL season. There has not been an instance in which the Art Ross Trophy winner has been awarded the Selke Trophy, though Fedorov finished second in regular season scoring in 1994, while Hart Trophy winner and Art Ross Trophy runner-up Joe Sakic finished second in Selke voting in 2001. The most points scored in a Selke-winning season is 127 by Doug Gilmour in the 1992–93 NHL season.

== Winners ==
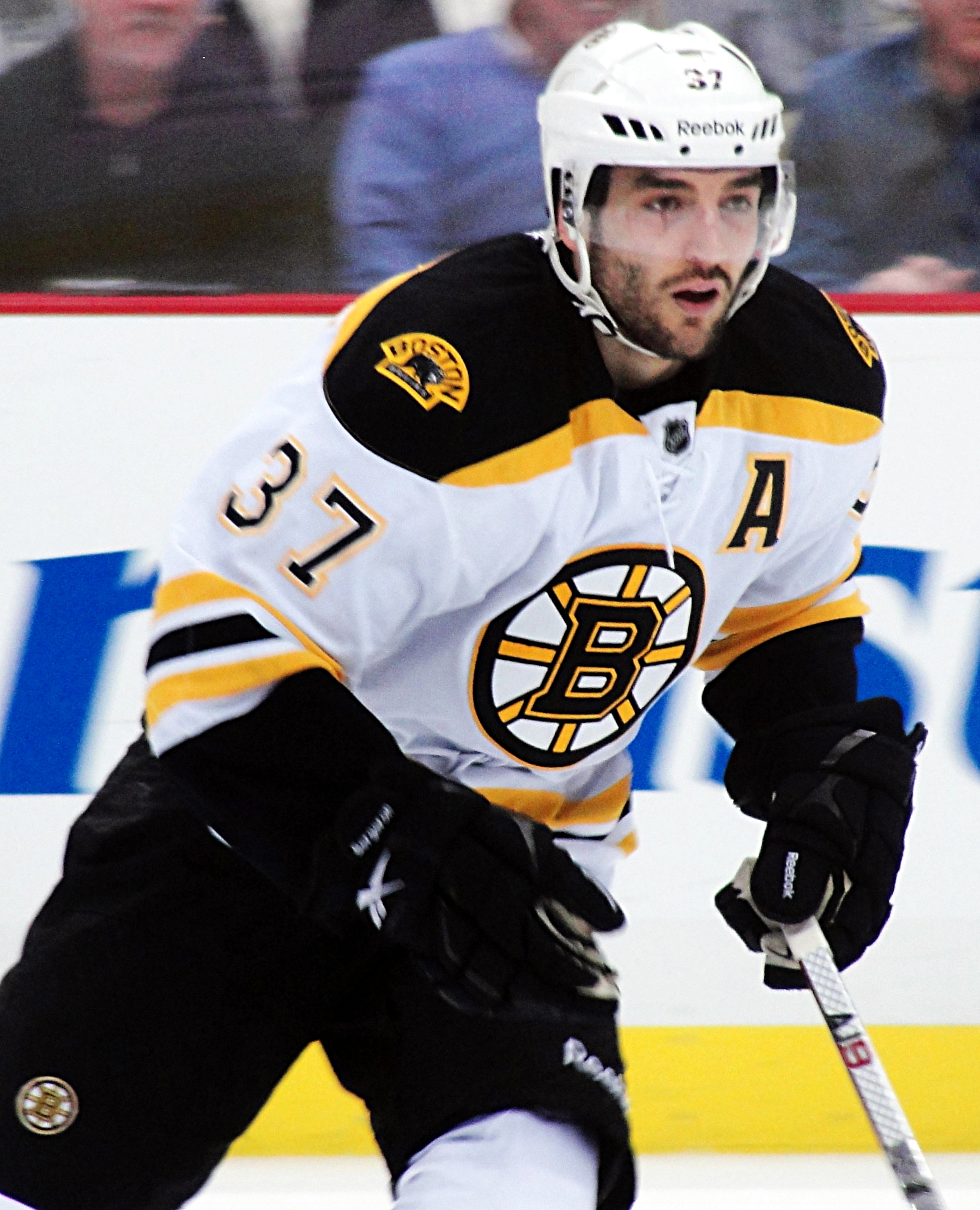
Patrice Bergeron, record six-time winner

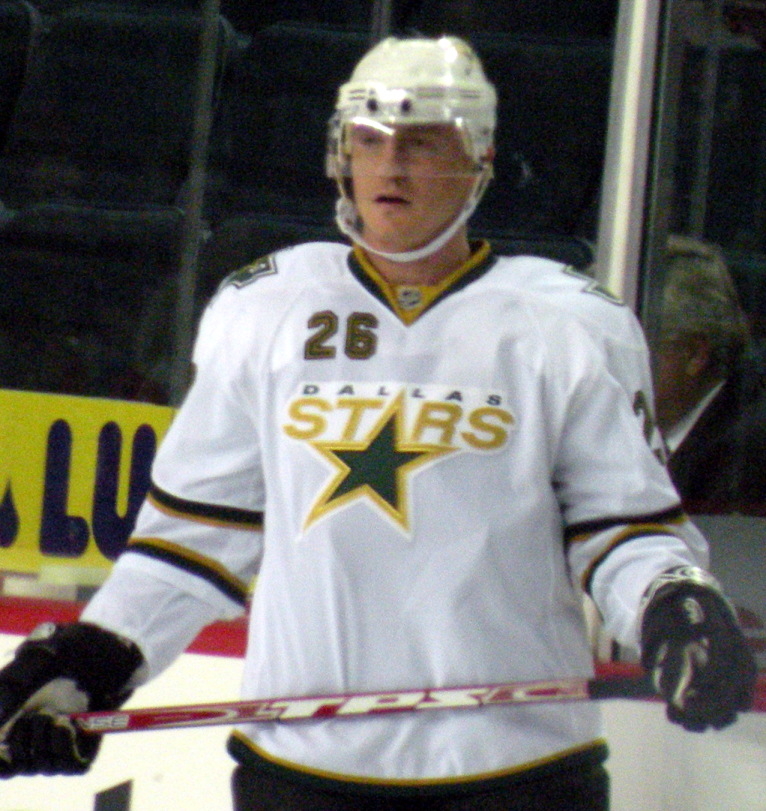
Jere Lehtinen, three-time winner

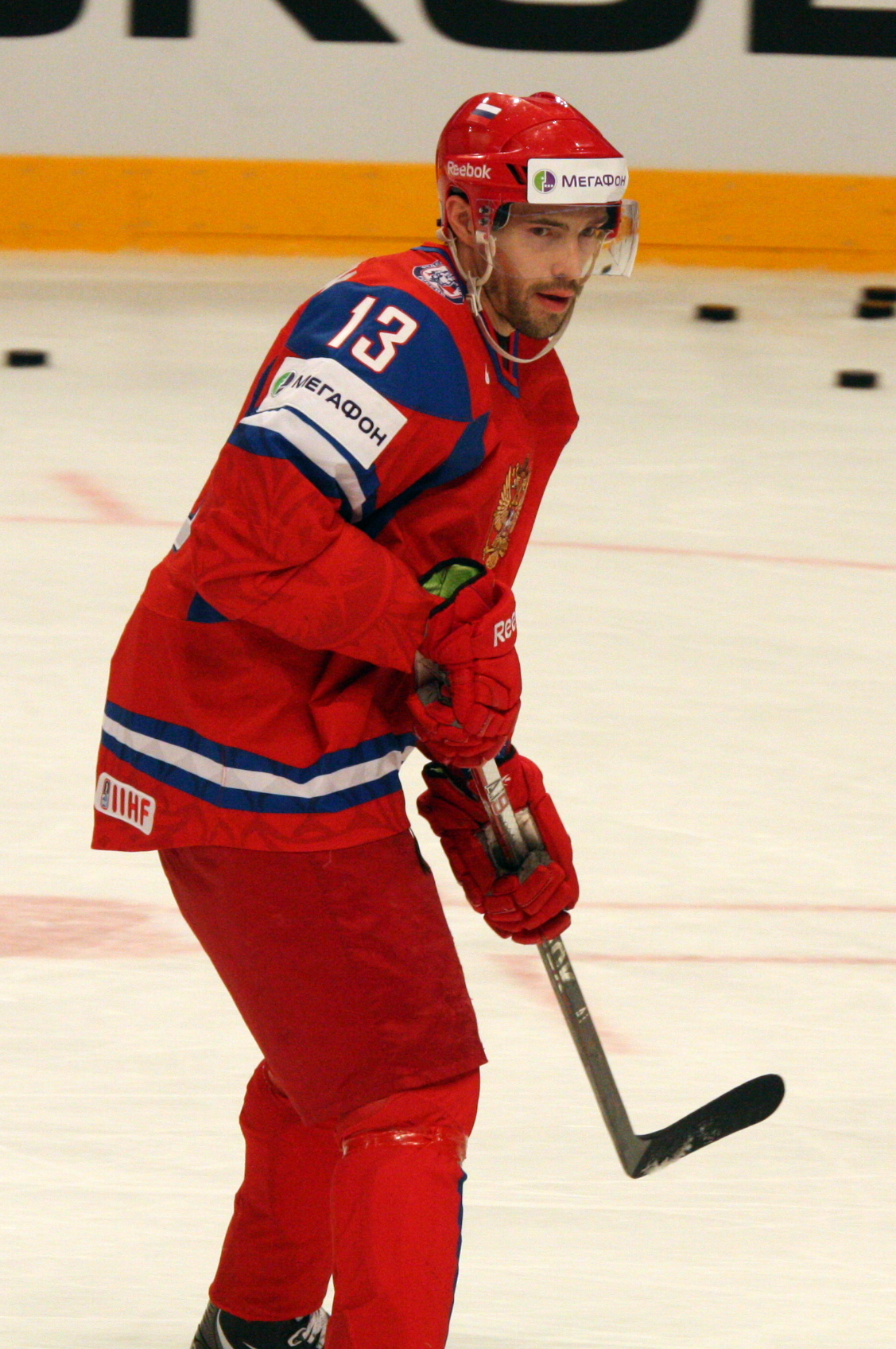
Pavel Datsyuk, three-time winner

Positions key
C	Centre	RW	Right wing	LW	Left wing

^ Player is still active
† Player's team won the Stanley Cup
* Player elected to the Hockey Hall of Fame
~ Inactive player not yet eligible for the Hockey Hall of Fame

Season	Winner	Team	Position	Win #
1977–78	Bob Gainey*	Montreal Canadiens†	LW	1
1978–79	Bob Gainey*	Montreal Canadiens†	LW	2
1979–80	Bob Gainey*	Montreal Canadiens	LW	3
1980–81	Bob Gainey*	Montreal Canadiens	LW	4
1981–82	Steve Kasper	Boston Bruins	C	1
1982–83	Bobby Clarke*	Philadelphia Flyers	C	1
1983–84	Doug Jarvis	Washington Capitals	C	1
1984–85	Craig Ramsay	Buffalo Sabres	LW	1
1985–86	Troy Murray	Chicago Blackhawks	C	1
1986–87	Dave Poulin	Philadelphia Flyers	C	1
1987–88	Guy Carbonneau*	Montreal Canadiens	C	1
1988–89	Guy Carbonneau*	Montreal Canadiens	C	2
1989–90	Rick Meagher	St. Louis Blues	C	1
1990–91	Dirk Graham	Chicago Blackhawks	RW	1
1991–92	Guy Carbonneau*	Montreal Canadiens	C	3
1992–93	Doug Gilmour*	Toronto Maple Leafs	C	1
1993–94	Sergei Fedorov*	Detroit Red Wings	C	1
1994–95	Ron Francis*	Pittsburgh Penguins	C	1
1995–96	Sergei Fedorov*	Detroit Red Wings	C	2
1996–97	Michael Peca	Buffalo Sabres	C	1
1997–98	Jere Lehtinen	Dallas Stars	RW	1
1998–99	Jere Lehtinen	Dallas Stars†	RW	2
1999–2000	Steve Yzerman*	Detroit Red Wings	C	1
2000–01	John Madden	New Jersey Devils	C	1
2001–02	Michael Peca	New York Islanders	C	2
2002–03	Jere Lehtinen	Dallas Stars	RW	3
2003–04	Kris Draper	Detroit Red Wings	C	1
2004–05	Season cancelled due to the 2004–05 NHL lockout			
2005–06	Rod Brind'Amour	Carolina Hurricanes†	C	1
2006–07	Rod Brind'Amour	Carolina Hurricanes	C	2
2007–08	Pavel Datsyuk*	Detroit Red Wings†	C	1
2008–09	Pavel Datsyuk*	Detroit Red Wings	C	2
2009–10	Pavel Datsyuk*	Detroit Red Wings	C	3
2010–11	Ryan Kesler	Vancouver Canucks	C	1
2011–12	Patrice Bergeron*	Boston Bruins	C	1
2012–13	Jonathan Toews~	Chicago Blackhawks†	C	1
2013–14	Patrice Bergeron*	Boston Bruins	C	2
2014–15	Patrice Bergeron*	Boston Bruins	C	3
2015–16	Anze Kopitar~	Los Angeles Kings	C	1
2016–17	Patrice Bergeron*	Boston Bruins	C	4
2017–18	Anze Kopitar~	Los Angeles Kings	C	2
2018–19	Ryan O'Reilly^	St. Louis Blues†	C	1
2019–20	Sean Couturier^	Philadelphia Flyers	C	1
2020–21	Aleksander Barkov^	Florida Panthers	C	1
2021–22	Patrice Bergeron*	Boston Bruins	C	5
2022–23	Patrice Bergeron*	Boston Bruins	C	6
2023–24	Aleksander Barkov^	Florida Panthers†	C	2
2024–25	Aleksander Barkov^	Florida Panthers†	C	3
2025–26	Nick Suzuki^	Montreal Canadiens	C	1

== See also ==
- List of National Hockey League awards
- List of NHL players
- List of NHL statistical leaders
- Two-way forward
