= Pavel Buchnevich =

Russian ice hockey player (born 1995)

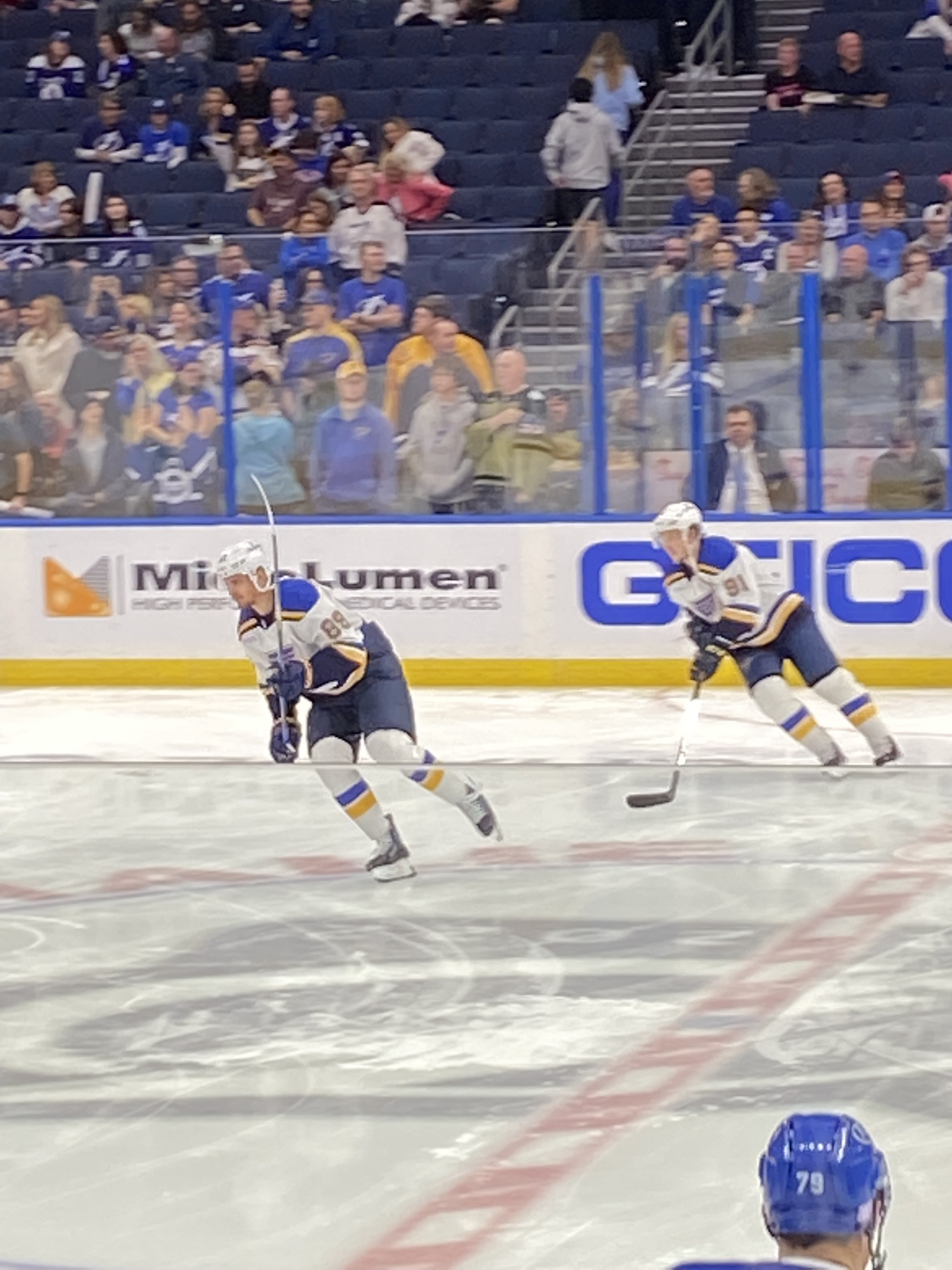
- Buchnevich with the St. Louis Blues in 2022
- Born: 17 April 1995 (age 31) Cherepovets, Russia
- Height: 6 ft 3 in (191 cm)
- Weight: 193 lb (88 kg; 13 st 11 lb)
- Position: Forward
- Shoots: Left
- NHL team Former teams: St. Louis Blues; Severstal Cherepovets; SKA Saint Petersburg; New York Rangers
- National team: Russia
- NHL draft: 75th overall, 2013; New York Rangers
- Playing career: 2012–present

Pavel Andreyevich Buchnevich (Russian: Павел Андреевич Бучневич; born 17 April 1995) is a Russian professional ice hockey player who is a forward for the St. Louis Blues of the National Hockey League (NHL).

Born and raised in Russia, Buchnevich started playing professional ice hockey at his hometown team Severstal Cherepovets of the Kontinental Hockey League (KHL) during the 2012–13 season. He was shortly thereafter drafted by the New York Rangers in the third round, 75th overall, of the 2013 NHL entry draft but chose to remain in Russia. In his final KHL season, he was traded to SKA Saint Petersburg before moving to the United States and joining the NHL.

Upon joining the Rangers, Buchnevich made his rookie debut during the 2016–17 season and played on their first line alongside Mika Zibanejad with Chris Kreider. He remained with the team for five seasons before being traded to the St. Louis Blues in exchange for Samuel Blais and a 2022 second-round pick.

As a citizen of Russia, Buchnevich has represented his home country at both the junior and senior levels in international tournaments. He made his international debut at the 2011 World U-17 Hockey Challenge where he won a gold medal. Before aging out of the junior levels, Buchnevich medaled again at the 2014 and 2015 World Junior Ice Hockey Championships.

== Early life ==
Buchnevich was born on 17 April 1995 in Cherepovets, Russia. He was born into an athletic family; his mother Yelena Razumova is a former competitive skier while his father Andrey is a youth soccer coach who formerly worked at a steel factory.

== Playing career ==
=== Professional ===
==== Severstal Cherepovets ====
A native of Cherepovets, Buchnevich played 102 games with the Almaz Cherepovets of the Junior Hockey League where he tallied 40 goals and 70 assists for 110 points. Despite a shortened 2011–12 season due to an injury, Buchnevich signed a three-year contract to play professional ice hockey at his hometown team Severstal Cherepovets during the 2012–13 season. During this time, he was ranked 10th amongst international skaters by the NHL Central Scouting Bureau. While he split the season between Almaz and Severstal, Buchnevich tallied 23 points through 24 games.

Following the conclusion of the season, Buchnevich was drafted in the third round, 75th overall, by the New York Rangers in the 2013 NHL entry draft. However, he chose to stay in the KHL because he did not feel he was ready to come to North America. As such, he returned to the KHL for the 2013–14 season, where he had a breakout season and registered 13 goals and 17 assists for 30 points through 48 games. His assist total second-most a KHL player younger than 20 years old had ever posted in one season. In his final KHL season, he was traded to SKA Saint Petersburg in exchange for financial compensation. At the time of the trade, he had recorded 29 points through 40 games. Upon joining the team, Buchnevich changed his jersey number from 89 to 88. He finished the regular season with 16 goals and 37 points as he helped Petersburg qualify for the playoffs. Upon being eliminated, Buchnevich underwent bursa sac surgery on his left elbow, which required a two-to-three week rehabilitation.

==== New York Rangers ====
On 13 May 2016, Buchnevich signed a three-year, entry-level contract with the Rangers. Following the signing, he participated in their 2016 Development Camp in July and the Traverse City Tournament in September. While training in New York with the Rangers’ strength and conditioning coach, Buchnevich requested he be placed with an English speaking family to learn the language. Buchnevich made the Rangers' final lineup for the 2016–17 season and played on their first line alongside Mika Zibanejad with Chris Kreider. During his debut on 13 October 2016, Buchnevich recorded his first career NHL point, an assist, in a 5–3 win over the New York Islanders. Following his debut, Buchnevich began to suffer from back spasms and missed the majority of October. Upon returning to the lineup, Buchnevich scored his first career NHL goal in a 5–2 win over the Boston Bruins on 5 November. However, Buchnevich missed significant time during his rookie season with back spasms, including a stretch of nearly two months from November 2016 to January 2017. After being cleared to return, Buchnevich was assigned to the Hartford Wolf Pack for a four-game conditioning stint, before finally returning to the Rangers on 13 January in a 4–2 loss to the Toronto Maple Leafs. Following a two-month absence, Buchnevich recorded five points in three games, including three in a 7–6 loss to the Dallas Stars. While playing alongside playing Zibanejad and Rick Nash, he also averaged 2:38 per game on the second power-play unit. He was returned to the AHL on 28 February 2017 but played one game before being recalled to the NHL level. As the Rangers qualified for the 2017 Stanley Cup playoffs, Buchnevich was a healthy scratch until Game 4 when he replaced Tanner Glass. Upon joining the lineup, he helped the Rangers win both Game 4 and Game 5 against the Montreal Canadiens.

Following his rookie season, Buchnevich was moved throughout the lineup by coach Alain Vigneault in favor of older, more experienced players. He began the 2018–19 season playing in a fourth line role alongside Boo Nieves and Michael Grabner. During the first few games of the season, the line combined for four goals and seven points. By the end of November, Buchnevich had recorded 20 points in his first 25 games before his offensive output slowed down. After recording a career-high 32 points through 50 games, Buchnevich suffered an upper-body injury during a game against the Toronto Maple Leafs on 2 February. He eventually returned to their lineup on 16 February against the Ottawa Senators. Buchnevich finished the season amongst the best Rangers forwards in regards to generating shot attempts, with 1.77 points per 60 minutes of 5-on-5 play and 1.75 primary assists per game.

Prior to his second season with the Rangers, the team hired David Quinn as their new head coach. Under his new head coach, Buchnevich was again moved throughout the lineup including spending time on their fourth line with Chytil and Vinni Lettieri. In early October, Buchnevich became a healthy scratch for back-to-back games and was encouraged by Quinn to "play better" in order to return to the lineup. He subsequently began the season by recording nine points in 14 games before suffering a broken thumb during a game against the Columbus Blue Jackets. Upon healing, Buchnevich was again moved throughout the Rangers lineup and spent seven games as a right-wing on the fourth line. Following a 1–0 loss to the Philadelphia Flyers, Buchnevich was again scratched by Quinn. Buchnevich finished the season with a career-high 21 goals and 38 points in 64 games. On 26 July 2019, the Rangers avoided arbitration and re-signed Buchnevich to a two-year, $6.5 million contract extension.

During the 2019–20 season, Buchnevich set career highs in points and assists before the season was cut short due to the COVID-19 pandemic. At the start of the season, Buchnevich played on the Rangers' first line and power-play unit alongside the newly acquired Artemi Panarin and Mika Zibanejad. Within their first two games together, they combined for 14 points. After Zibanejad was injured in late October, Buchnevich played alongside Chris Kreider and Filip Chytil. By 11 November, Buchnevich tied with Ryan Strome for the team lead in points with 11. Once Zibanejad returned from his injury on 26 November, Buchnevich re-joined his original line. Buchnevich's offensive output slowed down in December and he went nine games without tallying a point. In February 2020, Buchnevich and teammate Igor Shesterkin were involved in a car accident in Brooklyn, resulting in him being listed as day-to-day. As a result of the accident, he missed two games and about three weeks later, the NHL was paused due to the COVID-19 pandemic. Buchnevich finished the shortened regular season five goals away from tying his career-high and tallying 30 assists. His 50.82 Corsi percentage ranked first on the team while his 51.85 expected goal for percentage ranked third. Once the NHL returned to play, Buchnevich played in three playoff games, recording no points, as the Rangers were eliminated from playoff contention by the Carolina Hurricanes.

Buchnevich returned to the Rangers for the 2020–21 season after spending the off-season in Russia. On 15 March 2021, Buchnevich was placed on the NHL's COVID protocol list but was removed two days later and returned to the Rangers' lineup. On 17 April 2021, Buchnevich recorded his first NHL career hat-trick during a 6–3 win against the New Jersey Devils. During the month of May, Buchnevich and the Rangers engaged in a rivalry with the Washington Capitals during a back-to-back series. After Tom Wilson was fined for sucker-punching Buchnevich, he was suspended one game for responding by high-sticking Anthony Mantha. On 4 May, Buchnevich and the Rangers were officially eliminated from 2021 Stanley Cup contention. Upon completing the regular season with a career high 48 points through 54 games, Buchnevich engaged in contract negotiations with general manager Chris Drury as a restricted free agent with arbitration rights.

==== St. Louis Blues ====
On 23 July 2021, as a restricted free agent, Buchnevich was traded by the Rangers to the St. Louis Blues in exchange for Samuel Blais and a 2022 second-round pick. A few days later, Buchnevich signed a four-year, $23.2 million contract extension with the Blues. Buchnevich helped the Blues remain undefeated to start the 2021–22 season before being suspended for two games for head-butting Arizona Coyotes forward Lawson Crouse during a game. By March 2022, Buchnevich ranked third on the team in points with 46 through 50 games. He missed three games during the month after suffering a concussion but returned to the lineup for their game against the Penguins on 17 March. Later that month, Buchnevich scored his 99th and 100th career NHL goals in a 7–2 loss to the Carolina Hurricanes.

== International play ==
Medal record

Representing Russia

Ice hockey

World Junior Championships
Bronze medal – third place	2014 Sweden	
Silver medal – second place	2015 Canada	

World U17 Challenge
Gold medal – first place	2011 Russia	

As a native of Russia, Buchnevich has represented his home country on numerous occasions at both the junior and senior levels. He made his international debut at the 2011 World U-17 Hockey Challenge where he won a gold medal. Buchnevich then competed at the 2012 Ivan Hlinka Memorial Tournament, where he recorded two points in four games. His only goal of the tournament came during the opening game against the United States. His offensive output increased the following year during the 2013 IIHF World U18 Championships but Team Russia again failed to medal. After playing in two international tournaments where Russia failed to medal, Buchnevich helped them win a bronze medal at the 2014 World Junior Ice Hockey Championships and a silver medal at the 2015 World Junior Ice Hockey Championships.

Buchnevich remained off of Team Russia's international rosters until 2018 when he competed at the Ice Hockey World Championships. In Russia's first game against France, Buchnevich recorded an assist and his first career World Championship goal in the 7–0 win. He finished the tournament with three assists and one goal through eight games.

== Career statistics ==
=== Regular season and playoffs ===
			Regular season					Playoffs
Season	Team	League	GP	G	A	Pts	PIM	GP	G	A	Pts	PIM
2011–12	Almaz Cherepovets	MHL	45	15	29	44	55	10	4	3	7	4
2012–13	Almaz Cherepovets	MHL	24	8	15	23	36	3	1	4	5	12
2012–13	Severstal Cherepovets	KHL	12	1	1	2	0	6	0	0	0	0
2013–14	Almaz Cherepovets	MHL	2	0	2	2	2	7	4	5	9	12
2013–14	Severstal Cherepovets	KHL	40	7	11	18	12	—	—	—	—	—
2014–15	Severstal Cherepovets	KHL	48	13	17	30	16	—	—	—	—	—
2014–15	Almaz Cherepovets	MHL	—	—	—	—	—	11	8	12	20	32
2015–16	Severstal Cherepovets	KHL	40	12	17	29	20	—	—	—	—	—
2015–16	SKA Saint Petersburg	KHL	18	4	4	8	4	14	1	2	3	29
2016–17	New York Rangers	NHL	41	8	12	20	13	5	0	1	1	0
2016–17	Hartford Wolf Pack	AHL	4	3	2	5	0	—	—	—	—	—
2017–18	New York Rangers	NHL	74	14	29	43	20	—	—	—	—	—
2018–19	New York Rangers	NHL	64	21	17	38	13	—	—	—	—	—
2019–20	New York Rangers	NHL	68	16	30	46	24	3	0	0	0	6
2020–21	New York Rangers	NHL	54	20	28	48	42	—	—	—	—	—
2021–22	St. Louis Blues	NHL	73	30	46	76	34	12	1	10	11	6
2022–23	St. Louis Blues	NHL	63	26	41	67	36	—	—	—	—	—
2023–24	St. Louis Blues	NHL	80	27	36	63	48	—	—	—	—	—
2024–25	St. Louis Blues	NHL	76	20	37	57	23	7	3	5	8	14
2025–26	St. Louis Blues	NHL	81	20	28	48	26	—	—	—	—	—
KHL totals			158	37	50	87	52	20	1	2	3	29
NHL totals			674	202	304	506	279	27	4	16	20	26

=== International ===
Year	Team	Event	Result	GP	G	A	Pts	PIM
2011	Russia	U17	1st place, gold medalist(s)	5	0	1	1	0
2012	Russia	IH18	5th	4	1	1	2	0
2013	Russia	WJC18	4th	7	5	6	11	2
2014	Russia	WJC	3rd place, bronze medalist(s)	7	2	5	7	18
2015	Russia	WJC	2nd place, silver medalist(s)	7	1	5	6	2
2018	Russia	WC	6th	8	1	3	4	2
Junior totals				30	9	18	27	22
Senior totals				8	1	3	4	2
