= Clipping (ice hockey) =

Penalty in the sport of ice hockey

Clipping is a penalty in the sport of ice hockey. It is generally recognized as hitting an opposing player at or below the other player's knees. Clipping should not be confused with hip checking, where one player hits an opponent with his hips, although occasionally a hip check will result in a clipping call. A player is generally assessed a minor penalty for clipping, unless an injury is caused, in which case a major penalty and a misconduct or game misconduct will result. It is one of the most rarely called penalties in the sport.

Historically, players penalized for clipping are labeled as "dirty" players, as clipping is nearly always viewed as attempt to injure an opponent.

Additionally, Rule 639(a) of the USA Hockey Rulebook states:

“Any player who deliberately leaves his feet and contacts an opponent with any part of his body thereby causing the opponent to trip or fall shall be assessed a minor penalty (Clipping).(Note 3) This rule does not apply to a player who has dropped to his knee(s) to block a shot.”

== History ==
Clipping was instituted as a rule in the National Hockey League in 2002, following a low hit on 26 April by Toronto Maple Leafs forward Darcy Tucker on New York Islanders captain Michael Peca. The hit occurred during a Stanley Cup playoff matchup between the two teams, and Peca was unable to play for the remainder of the season. When the NHL added the new rule, the videotape distributed by the league showed the hit as an example of a clipping penalty that would result in an automatic game misconduct.
