= 2006 Stanley Cup playoffs =

Tournament details
- Dates: April 21 – June 19, 2006
- Teams: 16
- Defending champions: Tampa Bay Lightning (notwithstanding the cancelled 2004–05 season)

Final positions
- Champions: Carolina Hurricanes
- Runners-up: Edmonton Oilers

Tournament statistics
- Scoring leader(s): Eric Staal (Hurricanes) (28 points)

Awards
- MVP: Cam Ward (Hurricanes)

The 2006 Stanley Cup playoffs for the National Hockey League (NHL) championship began on April 21, 2006, following the 2005–06 regular season. This was the first playoffs since 2004 due to the 2004–05 NHL lockout that cancelled the previously scheduled season. The 16 teams that qualified, seeded one through eight from each conference, played best-of-seven series with re-seeding after the Conference quarterfinals. The conference champions played a best-of-seven series for the Stanley Cup.

The Finals concluded on June 19 with the Carolina Hurricanes winning the Stanley Cup, defeating the Edmonton Oilers in the final series four games to three. Carolina goaltender Cam Ward was awarded the Conn Smythe Trophy as Most Valuable Player of the playoffs. The Edmonton Oilers would miss the playoffs each year thereafter until 2017. This was also the last time until 2023 that the Pittsburgh Penguins missed the playoffs. The St. Louis Blues missed the playoffs for the first time since 1979, ending a 25-season playoff streak, the third longest in NHL history. The current longest playoff appearance streak in both pro sports and NHL moved to the Detroit Red Wings at 15 consecutive seasons. This was additionally the first time in history that the Chicago Blackhawks and the St. Louis Blues missed the playoffs in the same season.

While the 2005–06 season introduced a shootout to break ties after five minutes of four-on-four overtime, the Stanley Cup playoffs retained their traditional format of unlimited 20-minute periods of five-on-five sudden-death overtime to break ties.

The Western Conference made history in the first round when all four series were won by the lower-seeded teams (conversely, all four series in the Eastern Conference were won by the higher-seeded teams). The eighth- and lowest-seeded Oilers proceeded to win the Western Conference and participate in the Stanley Cup Finals. Four Canadian teams qualified for the playoffs this year, this total was not equaled again until 2013 and not exceeded until 2015 with five.

== Playoff seeds ==
The top eight teams in each conference qualified for the playoffs. The top three seeds in each conference were awarded to the division winners; while the five remaining spots were awarded to the highest finishers in their respective conferences.

The following teams qualified for the playoffs:

=== Eastern Conference ===
1. Ottawa Senators, Northeast Division champions, Eastern Conference regular season champions – 113 points
2. Carolina Hurricanes, Southeast Division champions – 112 points
3. New Jersey Devils, Atlantic Division champions – 101 points (46 wins)
4. Buffalo Sabres – 110 points
5. Philadelphia Flyers – 101 points (45 wins)
6. New York Rangers – 100 points
7. Montreal Canadiens – 93 points
8. Tampa Bay Lightning – 92 points

=== Western Conference ===
1. Detroit Red Wings, Central Division champions, Western Conference regular season champions, Presidents' Trophy winners – 124 points
2. Dallas Stars, Pacific Division champions – 112 points
3. Calgary Flames, Northwest Division champions – 103 points
4. Nashville Predators – 106 points
5. San Jose Sharks – 99 points
6. Mighty Ducks of Anaheim – 98 points
7. Colorado Avalanche – 95 points (43 wins)
8. Edmonton Oilers – 95 points (41 wins)

== Playoff bracket ==
In each round, teams competed in a best-of-seven series following a 2–2–1–1–1 format (scores in the bracket indicate the number of games won in each best-of-seven series). The team with home ice advantage played at home for games one and two (and games five and seven, if necessary), and the other team played at home for games three and four (and game six, if necessary). The top eight teams in each conference made the playoffs, with the three division winners seeded 1–3 based on regular season record, and the five remaining teams seeded 4–8.

The NHL used "re-seeding" instead of a fixed bracket playoff system. During the first three rounds, the highest remaining seed in each conference was matched against the lowest remaining seed, the second-highest remaining seed played the second-lowest remaining seed, and so forth. The higher-seeded team was awarded home ice advantage. The two conference winners then advanced to the Stanley Cup Finals, where home ice advantage was awarded to the team that had the better regular season record.

Conference quarterfinals	Conference semifinals
1	Ottawa	4
8	Tampa Bay	1
1	Ottawa	1
4	Buffalo	4
2	Carolina	4
7	Montreal	2
Eastern Conference
3	New Jersey	4
6	NY Rangers	0
2	Carolina	4
3	New Jersey	1
4	Buffalo	4
5	Philadelphia	2
1	Detroit	2
8	Edmonton	4
5	San Jose	2
8	Edmonton	4
2	Dallas	1
7	Colorado	4
Western Conference
3	Calgary	3
6	Anaheim	4
6	Anaheim	4
7	Colorado	0
4	Nashville	1
5	San Jose	4

Conference finals
4	Buffalo	3
2	Carolina	4
8	Edmonton	4
6	Anaheim	1

Stanley Cup Finals
E2	Carolina	4
W8	Edmonton	3

== Conference quarterfinals ==
=== Eastern Conference quarterfinals ===
==== (1) Ottawa Senators vs. (8) Tampa Bay Lightning ====
The Ottawa Senators entered the playoffs as the Eastern Conference regular season and Northeast Division champions with 113 points. Tampa Bay qualified as the eighth seed earning 92 points during the regular season. This was the first playoff meeting between these two teams. Ottawa won all four games during this year's regular season series.

The Senators defeated the Lightning in five games. The Senators used a two-man advantage in the third period of game one to gain the lead as they took the game by a score of 4–1. In game two the Lightning came back from a one-goal deficit by scoring two goals 55 seconds apart as they evened the series with a 4–3 victory. Six Ottawa skaters scored a goal in game three as the Senators won 8–4. Ottawa scored three times in the second-period of game four as they earned a 5–2 win. Martin Havlat scored the series-winning goal for the Senators at 15:02 of the second period as Ottawa closed out the series with a 3–2 victory.

April 21	Tampa Bay Lightning	1–4	Ottawa Senators	Scotiabank Place	Recap
Vincent Lecavalier (1) – pp – 19:00		First period	No scoring
No scoring		Second period	No scoring
No scoring		Third period	05:06 – pp – Martin Havlat (1); 06:13 – pp – Jason Spezza (1); 09:37 – sh – Mike Fisher (1); 18:58 – en – Daniel Alfredsson (1)
John Grahame 34 saves / 37 shots		Goalie stats	Ray Emery 35 saves / 36 shots

April 23	Tampa Bay Lightning	4–3	Ottawa Senators	Scotiabank Place	Recap
Martin St. Louis (1) – 14:36		First period	04:51 – Bryan Smolinski (1)
Brad Richards (1) – 07:39		Second period	17:12 – pp – Martin Havlat (2)
Dan Boyle (1) – 05:24; Martin St. Louis (2) – 06:19		Third period	03:21 – Peter Schaefer (1)
John Grahame 21 saves / 24 shots		Goalie stats	Ray Emery 32 saves / 36 shots

April 25	Ottawa Senators	8–4	Tampa Bay Lightning	St. Pete Times Forum	Recap
Martin Havlat (3) – 05:20; Wade Redden (1) – pp – 08:40; Patrick Eaves (1) – 12:56		First period	18:38 – pp – Martin St. Louis (3)
Martin Havlat (4) – 02:17; Antoine Vermette (1) – 09:11		Second period	No scoring
Dany Heatley (1) – pp – 06:12; Zdeno Chara (1) – pp – 10:28; Antoine Vermette (2) – 16:18		Third period	00:20 – pp – Paul Ranger (1); 11:26 – Paul Ranger (2); 13:25 – pp – Pavel Kubina (1)
Ray Emery 35 saves / 39 shots		Goalie stats	John Grahame 15 saves / 20 shots Sean Burke 8 saves / 11 shots

April 27	Ottawa Senators	5–2	Tampa Bay Lightning	St. Pete Times Forum	Recap
Jason Spezza (2) – 06:13		First period	11:10 – Martin St. Louis (4); 16:15 – Brad Richards (2)
Chris Phillips (1) – 05:59; Dany Heatley (2) – pp – 17:10; Martin Havlat (5) – 17:50		Second period	No scoring
Chris Neil (1) – 01:24		Third period	No scoring
Ray Emery 30 saves / 32 shots		Goalie stats	John Grahame 13 saves / 17 shots Sean Burke 7 saves / 8 shots

April 29	Tampa Bay Lightning	2–3	Ottawa Senators	Scotiabank Place	Recap
No scoring		First period	12:53 – Peter Schaefer (2); 15:44 – Andrej Meszaros (1)
Evgeny Artyukhin (1) – 01:37; Brad Richards (3) – 18:15		Second period	15:02 – pp – Martin Havlat (6)
No scoring		Third period	No scoring
Sean Burke 35 saves / 38 shots		Goalie stats	Ray Emery 26 saves / 28 shots

Ottawa won series 4–1

==== (2) Carolina Hurricanes vs. (7) Montreal Canadiens ====
The Carolina Hurricanes entered the playoffs as the Southeast Division champions, earning the second seed in the Eastern Conference with 112 points. Montreal qualified as the seventh seed earning 93 points during the regular season. This was the seventh playoff meeting between these two teams with Montreal winning five of the six previous series. They last met in the 2002 Eastern Conference semifinals where Carolina won in six games. Carolina won all four games during this year's regular season series.

The Hurricanes eliminated the Canadiens in six games. After allowing a goal in the opening minute of game one the Canadiens scored six unanswered goals taking the opening game of the series 6–1. Carolina pulled goaltender Martin Gerber after allowing three goals in the first period of game two and he was replaced by 22-year-old rookie backup Cam Ward. The Hurricanes were able to tie the game with 90 seconds remaining in regulation before losing in double overtime as Michael Ryder scored at 2:32, giving Montreal a 6–5 win. In game three Eric Staal scored the game winner 3:38 into overtime as Carolina won 2–1. Rod Brind'Amour gave the Hurricanes the lead in game four and they hung on to win 3–2. Cam Ward made 30 saves and allowed just one goal against as the Hurricanes took game five 2–1. Hurricanes forward Cory Stillman ended the series at 1:19 of the first overtime as Carolina won game six 2–1.

April 22	Montreal Canadiens	6–1	Carolina Hurricanes	RBC Center	Recap
Francis Bouillon (1) – pp – 08:23; Radek Bonk (1) – 16:17		First period	00:50 – Matt Cullen (1)
Alexei Kovalev (1) – 02:18; Chris Higgins (1) – 16:01		Second period	No scoring
Alexei Kovalev (2) – pp – 11:40; Sheldon Souray (1) – 18:12		Third period	No scoring
Cristobal Huet 42 saves / 43 shots		Goalie stats	Martin Gerber 15 saves / 21 shots

April 24	Montreal Canadiens	6–5	2OT	Carolina Hurricanes	RBC Center	Recap
Jan Bulis (1) – 04:48; Michael Ryder (1) – pp – 13:35; Radek Bonk (2) – 14:46		First period		No scoring
No scoring		Second period		01:42 – Matt Cullen (2); 09:05 – pp – Rod Brind'Amour (1)
Alexei Kovalev (3) – 05:22; Richard Zednik (1) – 05:58		Third period		00:22 – pp – Ray Whitney (1); 01:15 – pp – Rod Brind'Amour (2); 18:30 – Cory Stillman (1)
Michael Ryder (2) – 02:32		Second overtime period		No scoring
Cristobal Huet 41 saves / 46 shots		Goalie stats		Martin Gerber 10 saves / 13 shots Cam Ward 20 saves / 23 shots

April 26	Carolina Hurricanes	2–1	OT	Montreal Canadiens	Bell Centre	Recap
No scoring		First period		No scoring
No scoring		Second period		09:17 – pp – Richard Zednik (2)
Rod Brind'Amour (3) – 11:27		Third period		No scoring
Eric Staal (1) – pp – 03:38		First overtime period		No scoring
Cam Ward 27 saves / 28 shots		Goalie stats		Cristobal Huet 34 saves / 36 shots

April 28	Carolina Hurricanes	3–2	Montreal Canadiens	Bell Centre	Recap
Justin Williams (1) – 10:22; Aaron Ward (1) – 11:33		First period	No scoring
No scoring		Second period	05:21 – Alexander Perezhogin (1); 12:58 – pp – Sheldon Souray (2)
Rod Brind'Amour (4) – 05:54		Third period	No scoring
Cam Ward 23 saves / 25 shots		Goalie stats	Cristobal Huet 27 saves / 30 shots

April 30	Montreal Canadiens	1–2	Carolina Hurricanes	RBC Center	Recap
No scoring		First period	04:27 – pp – Eric Staal (2)
Alexei Kovalev (4) – 19:32		Second period	13:57 – pp – Matt Cullen (3)
No scoring		Third period	No scoring
Cristobal Huet 26 saves / 28 shots		Goalie stats	Cam Ward 30 saves / 31 shots

May 2	Carolina Hurricanes	2–1	OT	Montreal Canadiens	Bell Centre	Recap
Mark Recchi (1) – 07:01		First period		06:31 – pp – Sheldon Souray (3)
No scoring		Second period		No scoring
No scoring		Third period		No scoring
Cory Stillman (2) – 01:19		First overtime period		No scoring
Cam Ward 25 saves / 26 shots		Goalie stats		Cristobal Huet 27 saves / 29 shots

Carolina won series 4–2

==== (3) New Jersey Devils vs. (6) New York Rangers ====
The New Jersey Devils entered the playoffs as the Atlantic Division champions (winning the tie-breaker with Philadelphia in total wins), earning the third seed in the Eastern Conference with 101 points. New York qualified for the first time since 1997 as the sixth seed earning 100 points during the regular season. This was the fourth playoff meeting between these two teams with New York winning all three previous series. They last met in the 1997 Eastern Conference semifinals where New York won in five games. The teams split this year's eight game regular season series.

The Devils swept the Rangers in four games. The Devils scored five times on the power play in game one winning 6–1, Devils forward Patrik Elias scored six points in the victory (two goals and four assists). In game two John Madden scored a hat trick for the Devils as they earned a 4–1 victory. Martin Brodeur earned his 21st career playoff shutout with 25 saves as the Devils won game three 3–0. New Jersey took the lead in the second period of game four with two power play goals and they never looked back eliminating the Rangers by a final score of 4–2.

April 22	New York Rangers	1–6	New Jersey Devils	Continental Airlines Arena	Recap
Petr Prucha (1) – pp – 10:00		First period	03:55 – pp – Patrik Elias (1)
No scoring		Second period	07:48 – pp – Scott Gomez (1); 17:10 – Ken Klee (1)
No scoring		Third period	00:53 – pp – Brian Rafalski (1); 08:45 – pp – Jamie Langenbrunner (1); 15:34 – pp – Patrik Elias (2)
Henrik Lundqvist 24 saves / 30 shots		Goalie stats	Martin Brodeur 29 saves / 30 shots

April 24	New York Rangers	1–4	New Jersey Devils	Continental Airlines Arena	Recap
No scoring		First period	07:47 – sh – John Madden (1); 14:13 – pp – Brian Gionta (1)
No scoring		Second period	19:54 – sh – John Madden (2)
Blair Betts (1) – 05:41		Third period	12:46 – John Madden (3)
Kevin Weekes 21 saves / 25 shots		Goalie stats	Martin Brodeur 25 saves / 26 shots

April 26	New Jersey Devils	3–0	New York Rangers	Madison Square Garden	Recap
Jamie Langenbrunner (2) – 01:08; Patrik Elias (3) – 09:20		First period	No scoring
Zach Parise (1) – 02:48		Second period	No scoring
No scoring		Third period	No scoring
Martin Brodeur 25 saves / 25 shots		Goalie stats	Henrik Lundqvist 17 saves / 20 shots

April 29	New Jersey Devils	4–2	New York Rangers	Madison Square Garden	Recap
No scoring		First period	19:41 – Jed Ortmeyer (1)
Scott Gomez (2) – pp – 04:20; Patrik Elias (4) – pp – 07:21		Second period	No scoring
Brian Gionta (2) – sh – 04:30; Patrik Elias (5) – 13:21		Third period	18:33 – pp – Steve Rucchin (1)
Martin Brodeur 31 saves / 33 shots		Goalie stats	Henrik Lundqvist 25 saves / 29 shots

New Jersey won series 4–0

==== (4) Buffalo Sabres vs. (5) Philadelphia Flyers ====
The Buffalo Sabres entered the playoffs as the fourth seed in the Eastern Conference with 110 points. Philadelphia qualified as the fifth seed (losing the tie-breaker with New Jersey in total wins for the Atlantic Division title) earning 101 points during the regular season. This was the eighth playoff meeting between these two teams with Philadelphia winning five of the seven previous series. They last met in the 2001 Eastern Conference quarterfinals where Buffalo won in six games. Buffalo won three of the four games during this year's regular season series.

The Sabres defeated the Flyers in six games. Philadelphia goaltender Robert Esche made 55 saves in a 3–2 Flyers loss; Daniel Briere ended the game with a goal at 7:31 in double-overtime. Buffalo forwards Jean-Pierre Dumont and Jason Pominville each recorded hat-tricks in game two as the Sabres scored three power play goals rolling to an 8–2 victory. Peter Forsberg scored two second period goals in game three to break a 1–1 tie, the Flyers went on to win the game 4–2. In game four R. J. Umberger put the Flyers up for good with his goal at 9:51 in the third period as Philadelphia evened the series with a 5–4 victory. Sabres goaltender Ryan Miller made 24 saves to earn his first career playoff shutout in game five as Buffalo won 3–0. In game six the Sabres jumped to a 5–0 lead on a goal by Maxim Afinogenov as the Flyers pulled Robert Esche from the game, Buffalo went on to a resounding 7–1 series-clinching victory.

April 22	Philadelphia Flyers	2–3	2OT	Buffalo Sabres	HSBC Arena	Recap
No scoring		First period		05:20 – Tim Connolly (1)
Mike Knuble (1) – 16:34		Second period		04:33 – Jay McKee (1)
Simon Gagne (1) – pp – 18:09		Third period		No scoring
No scoring		Second overtime period		07:31 – Daniel Briere (1)
Robert Esche 55 saves / 58 shots		Goalie stats		Ryan Miller 30 saves / 32 shots

April 24	Philadelphia Flyers	2–8	Buffalo Sabres	HSBC Arena	Recap
No scoring		First period	01:41 – Jean-Pierre Dumont (1); 03:00 – pp – Chris Drury (1); 12:26 – Ales Kotalik (1); 14:36 – Jason Pominville (1); 19:46 – pp – Jean-Pierre Dumont (2)
Simon Gagne (2) – 00:58		Second period	09:42 – pp – Jean-Pierre Dumont (3)
Petr Nedved (1) – 05:47		Third period	08:35 – Jason Pominville (2); 18:42 – Jason Pominville (3)
Robert Esche 5 saves / 10 shots Antero Niittymaki 15 saves / 18 shots		Goalie stats	Ryan Miller 20 saves / 22 shots

April 26	Buffalo Sabres	2–4	Philadelphia Flyers	Wachovia Center	Recap
Ales Kotalik (2) – 02:37		First period	06:35 – sh – Brian Savage (1)
No scoring		Second period	06:57 – Peter Forsberg (1); 12:37 – pp – Peter Forsberg (2)
Tim Connolly (2) – 04:44		Third period	19:44 – en – Simon Gagne (3)
Ryan Miller 23 saves / 26 shots		Goalie stats	Robert Esche 26 saves / 28 shots

April 28	Buffalo Sabres	4–5	Philadelphia Flyers	Wachovia Center	Recap
Thomas Vanek (1) – pp – 02:34; Daniel Briere (2) – 10:10		First period	12:13 – Éric Desjardins (1)
No scoring		Second period	03:26 – Peter Forsberg (3)
Daniel Briere (3) – pp – 06:17; Mike Grier (1) – sh – 19:41		Third period	03:50 – pp – Petr Nedved (2); 09:51 – R. J. Umberger (1); 19:11 – Peter Forsberg (4)
Ryan Miller 28 saves / 33 shots		Goalie stats	Robert Esche 26 saves / 30 shots

April 30	Philadelphia Flyers	0–3	Buffalo Sabres	HSBC Arena	Recap
No scoring		First period	06:05 – pp – Tim Connolly (3)
No scoring		Second period	19:12 – pp – Jean-Pierre Dumont (4)
No scoring		Third period	04:50 – Maxim Afinogenov (1)
Robert Esche 30 saves / 33 shots		Goalie stats	Ryan Miller 24 saves / 24 shots

May 2	Buffalo Sabres	7–1	Philadelphia Flyers	Wachovia Center	Recap
Mike Grier (2) – 11:16; Ales Kotalik (3) – 17:34; Derek Roy (1) – 19:27		First period	No scoring
Jason Pominville (4) – 03:05; Maxim Afinogenov (2) – 07:19; Chris Drury (2) – 19:46		Second period	18:57 – Branko Radivojevic (1)
Chris Drury (3) – sh – 02:12		Third period	No scoring
Ryan Miller 21 saves / 22 shots		Goalie stats	Robert Esche 12 saves / 17 shots Antero Niittymaki 9 saves / 11 shots

Buffalo won series 4–2

=== Western Conference quarterfinals ===
==== (1) Detroit Red Wings vs. (8) Edmonton Oilers ====
The Detroit Red Wings entered the playoffs as the Presidents' Trophy winners, the Western Conference regular season and Central Division champions, with 124 points. Edmonton qualified as the eighth seed earning 95 points (losing the tie-breaker with Colorado in total wins) during the regular season. This was the third playoff meeting between these two teams with Edmonton winning both previous series. They last met in the 1988 Clarence Campbell Conference Final where Edmonton won in five games. Detroit won this year's four game regular season series earning six of eight points during the season.

The eighth seeded Oilers upset the Red Wings in six games. Red Wings winger Kirk Maltby scored two goals in game one, including the winner in double overtime as Detroit won 3–2. The Oilers took the lead by scoring twice in 57 seconds in the second period of game two as they hung on to win 4–2. Jarret Stoll provided the game-winner in double overtime in game three giving the Oilers a 4–3 victory. The Red Wings scored three power-play goals in game four earning a 4–2 victory to tie the series. Oilers goaltender Dwayne Roloson made 30 saves as Edmonton hung on to win game five by a score of 3–2. The Oilers overcame a two-goal deficit after two periods of play in game six by scoring four times in third period, and Ales Hemsky broke the tie with 1:06 remaining in regulation as Edmonton ended the series with a 4–3 win.

April 21	Edmonton Oilers	2–3	2OT	Detroit Red Wings	Joe Louis Arena	Recap
Sergei Samsonov (1) – pp – 11:44		First period		04:05 – pp – Robert Lang (1)
Chris Pronger (1) – pp – 08:43		Second period		No scoring
No scoring		Third period		13:43 – Kirk Maltby (1)
No scoring		Second overtime period		02:39 – Kirk Maltby (2)
Dwayne Roloson 54 saves / 57 shots		Goalie stats		Manny Legace 23 saves / 25 shots

April 23	Edmonton Oilers	4–2	Detroit Red Wings	Joe Louis Arena	Recap
Chris Pronger (2) – 12:32		First period	14:50 – Jason Williams (1)
Fernando Pisani (1) – 17:49; Brad Winchester (1) – 18:46		Second period	07:11 – pp – Henrik Zetterberg (1)
Jarret Stoll (1) – en – 19:47		Third period	No scoring
Dwayne Roloson 33 saves / 35 shots		Goalie stats	Manny Legace 20 saves / 23 shots

April 25	Detroit Red Wings	3–4	2OT	Edmonton Oilers	Rexall Place	Recap
Henrik Zetterberg (2) – pp – 12:05		First period		04:17 – Jaroslav Spacek (1); 16:38 – Ryan Smyth (1)
No scoring		Second period		02:38 – pp – Raffi Torres (1)
Henrik Zetterberg (3) – pp – 11:52; Mathieu Schneider (1) – 12:10		Third period		No scoring
No scoring		Second overtime period		08:44 – Jarret Stoll (2)
Manny Legace 28 saves / 32 shots		Goalie stats		Dwayne Roloson 44 saves / 47 shots

April 27	Detroit Red Wings	4–2	Edmonton Oilers	Rexall Place	Recap
Tomas Holmstrom (1) – pp – 13:25; Robert Lang (2) – 19:23		First period	07:22 – pp – Fernando Pisani (2)
No scoring		Second period	04:03 – pp – Jaroslav Spacek (2)
Nicklas Lidstrom (1) – pp – 06:44; Henrik Zetterberg (4) – pp – 15:53		Third period	No scoring
Manny Legace 24 saves / 26 shots		Goalie stats	Dwayne Roloson 27 saves / 31 shots

April 29	Edmonton Oilers	3–2	Detroit Red Wings	Joe Louis Arena	Recap
No scoring		First period	No scoring
Fernando Pisani (3) – 05:16; Ryan Smyth (2) – pp – 08:34; Shawn Horcoff (1) – 12:36		Second period	18:39 – Brendan Shanahan (1)
No scoring		Third period	19:38 – Henrik Zetterberg (5)
Dwayne Roloson 30 saves / 32 shots		Goalie stats	Manny Legace 16 saves / 19 shots

May 1	Detroit Red Wings	3–4	Edmonton Oilers	Rexall Place	Recap
Henrik Zetterberg (6) – 14:36		First period	No scoring
Robert Lang (3) – pp – 14:02		Second period	No scoring
Johan Franzen (1) – 10:07		Third period	02:56 – pp – Fernando Pisani (4); 06:40 – Fernando Pisani (5); 16:07 – pp – Ales Hemsky (1); 18:54 – Ales Hemsky (2)
Manny Legace 26 saves / 30 shots		Goalie stats	Dwayne Roloson 33 saves / 36 shots

Edmonton won series 4–2

==== (2) Dallas Stars vs. (7) Colorado Avalanche ====
The Dallas Stars entered the playoffs as the Pacific Division champions, earning the second seed in the Western Conference with 112 points. Colorado qualified as the seventh seed earning 95 points (winning the tie-breaker with Edmonton in total wins) during the regular season. This was the fourth and 2nd most recent playoff meeting between these two teams, with Dallas winning two of three previous series. They last met in the 2004 Western Conference quarterfinals where Colorado won in five games.

The Avalanche upset the Stars in five games. After trailing by two early in the first period of game one the Avalanche scored five unanswered goals and won by a score of 5–2. Brett Clark tied the game with a short-handed goal at 17:56 of the third period and four and a half minutes into overtime Joe Sakic scored his NHL-record seventh career playoff overtime goal to end the game in a 5–4 Colorado victory. Avalanche forward Andrew Brunette scored with 57 seconds remaining in the third period to tie game three and Alex Tanguay tallied his second goal of the game at 1:09 of the first overtime to give the Avalanche a 4–3 win. Dallas staved off elimination in game four as Niklas Hagman scored two goals in a 4–1 victory. Colorado goaltender Jose Theodore made 50 saves in game five and Andrew Brunette scored the series-clinching goal nearly fourteen minutes into overtime to give the Avalanche a 3–2 win.

April 22	Colorado Avalanche	5–2	Dallas Stars	American Airlines Center	Recap
Milan Hejduk (1) – 16:42		First period	13:04 – Brendan Morrow (1); 15:02 – Bill Guerin (1)
Wojtek Wolski (1) – 05:24; Rob Blake (1) – pp – 09:08; John-Michael Liles (1) – pp – 11:12		Second period	No scoring
Brett Clark (1) – 02:58		Third period	No scoring
Jose Theodore 16 saves / 18 shots		Goalie stats	Marty Turco 26 saves / 31 shots

April 24	Colorado Avalanche	5–4	OT	Dallas Stars	American Airlines Center	Recap
Rob Blake (2) – pp – 07:06; Andrew Brunette (1) – 09:04; Milan Hejduk (2) – 12:23		First period		No scoring
No scoring		Second period		02:41 – Jussi Jokinen (1); 05:54 – pp – Jere Lehtinen (1); 06:58 – Jere Lehtinen (2); 19:57 – pp – Mike Modano (1)
Brett Clark (2) – sh – 17:56		Third period		No scoring
Joe Sakic (1) – 04:36		First overtime period		No scoring
Jose Theodore 21 saves / 25 shots		Goalie stats		Marty Turco 18 saves / 23 shots

April 26	Dallas Stars	3–4	OT	Colorado Avalanche	Pepsi Center	Recap
Stu Barnes (1) – sh – 10:49		First period		05:21 – pp – Joe Sakic (2); 18:53 – Alex Tanguay (1) – 18:53
Jon Klemm (1) – 08:44; Sergei Zubov (1) – pp – 19:45		Second period		No scoring
No scoring		Third period		19:03 – pp – Andrew Brunette (2)
No scoring		First overtime period		01:09 – Alex Tanguay (2)
Marty Turco 25 saves / 29 shots		Goalie stats		Jose Theodore 19 saves / 22 shots

April 28	Dallas Stars	4–1	Colorado Avalanche	Pepsi Center	Recap
Jere Lehtinen (3) – 07:35		First period	04:46 – Brad Richardson (1)
Niklas Hagman (1) – 03:50; Bill Guerin (2) – pp – 18:41		Second period	No scoring
Niklas Hagman (2) – en – 18:45		Third period	No scoring
Marty Turco 22 saves / 23 shots		Goalie stats	Jose Theodore 35 saves / 38 shots

April 30	Colorado Avalanche	3–2	OT	Dallas Stars	American Airlines Center	Recap
No scoring		First period		No scoring
Jim Dowd (1) – 13:03; Joe Sakic (3) – 19:58		Second period		04:25 – pp – Jussi Jokinen (2)
No scoring		Third period		02:47 – Bill Guerin (3)
Andrew Brunette (3) – 13:55		First overtime period		No scoring
Jose Theodore 50 saves / 52 shots		Goalie stats		Marty Turco 27 saves / 30 shots

Colorado won series 4–1

==== (3) Calgary Flames vs. (6) Mighty Ducks of Anaheim ====
The Calgary Flames entered the playoffs as the Northwest Division champions, earning the third seed in the Western Conference with 103 points. Anaheim qualified as the sixth seed earning 98 points during the regular season. This was the first playoff meeting between these two teams. The teams split this year's four game regular season series.

The Mighty Ducks eliminated the Flames in seven games. Flames goaltender Miikka Kiprusoff made 33 saves and Darren McCarty scored 9:45 into the first overtime as Calgary won game one 2–1. In game two Anaheim took a three-goal lead and hung on for a 4–3 victory. The Flames scored three power-play goals as they earned a 5–2 win in game three. Sean O'Donnell scored the overtime winner shortly after a power play expired in game four as Anaheim evened the series with a 3–2 victory. Flames captain Jarome Iginla scored twice as the Calgary held off a late charge by the Mighty Ducks taking a 3–2 victory in game five. In game six, Mighty Ducks captain Scott Niedermayer scored a power-play goal with just over five minutes remaining in regulation time as Anaheim forced a seventh game with their 2–1 win. Anaheim goaltender Ilya Bryzgalov made 22 saves as the Mighty Ducks ended the Flames season with a shutout winning game seven 3–0.

April 21	Mighty Ducks of Anaheim	1–2	OT	Calgary Flames	Pengrowth Saddledome	Recap
No scoring		First period		No scoring
No scoring		Second period		06:17 – Tony Amonte (1)
Jeff Friesen (1) – 05:17		Third period		No scoring
No scoring		First overtime period		09:45 – Darren McCarty (1)
Ilya Bryzgalov 28 saves / 30 shots		Goalie stats		Miikka Kiprusoff 33 saves / 34 shots

April 23	Mighty Ducks of Anaheim	4–3	Calgary Flames	Pengrowth Saddledome	Recap
Chris Kunitz (1) – 09:37; Scott Niedermayer (1) – sh – 13:20		First period	No scoring
Joffrey Lupul (1) – 05:10		Second period	09:09 – sh – Jarome Iginla (1); 11:53 – pp – Kristian Huselius (1)
Samuel Pahlsson (1) – 07:55		Third period	15:31 – pp – Dion Phaneuf (1)
Jean-Sebastien Giguere 22 saves / 25 shots		Goalie stats	Miikka Kiprusoff 16 saves / 20 shots

April 25	Calgary Flames	5–2	Mighty Ducks of Anaheim	Arrowhead Pond of Anaheim	Recap
Daymond Langkow (1) – pp – 14:01		First period	17:26 – pp – François Beauchemin (1)
Kristian Huselius (2) – pp – 01:25; Chuck Kobasew (1) – 15:34		Second period	08:16 – pp – François Beauchemin (2)
Darren McCarty (2) – 04:59; Robyn Regehr (1) – pp – 05:33		Third period	No scoring
Miikka Kiprusoff 27 saves / 29 shots		Goalie stats	Jean-Sebastien Giguere 19 saves / 24 shots

April 27	Calgary Flames	2–3	OT	Mighty Ducks of Anaheim	Arrowhead Pond of Anaheim	Recap
No scoring		First period		No scoring
No scoring		Second period		03:47 – Ryan Getzlaf (1); 07:13 – pp – Teemu Selanne (1)
Jarome Iginla (2) – 00:11; Jarome Iginla (3) – 03:27		Third period		No scoring
No scoring		First overtime period		01:36 – Sean O'Donnell (1)
Miikka Kiprusoff 27 saves / 30 shots		Goalie stats		Jean-Sebastien Giguere 25 saves / 27 shots

April 29	Mighty Ducks of Anaheim	2–3	Calgary Flames	Pengrowth Saddledome	Recap
No scoring		First period	05:49 – sh – Tony Amonte (2); 16:18 – pp – Jarome Iginla (4)
No scoring		Second period	01:03 – Jarome Iginla (5)
Andy McDonald (1) – pp – 08:19; Rob Niedermayer (1) – pp – 19:27		Third period	No scoring
Jean-Sebastien Giguere 5 saves / 8 shots Ilya Bryzgalov 19 saves / 19 shots		Goalie stats	Miikka Kiprusoff 26 saves / 28 shots

May 1	Calgary Flames	1–2	Mighty Ducks of Anaheim	Arrowhead Pond of Anaheim	Recap
Stephane Yelle (1) – 10:18		First period	No scoring
No scoring		Second period	07:49 – Teemu Selanne (2)
No scoring		Third period	14:23 – pp – Scott Niedermayer (2)
Miikka Kiprusoff 28 saves / 30 shots		Goalie stats	Ilya Bryzgalov 21 saves / 22 shots

May 3	Mighty Ducks of Anaheim	3–0	Calgary Flames	Pengrowth Saddledome	Recap
No scoring		First period	No scoring
Teemu Selanne (3) – 05:12; Ruslan Salei (1) – 19:01		Second period	No scoring
Jeff Friesen (2) – en – 19:40		Third period	No scoring
Ilya Bryzgalov 22 saves / 22 shots		Goalie stats	Miikka Kiprusoff 29 saves / 31 shots

Anaheim won series 4–3

==== (4) Nashville Predators vs. (5) San Jose Sharks ====
The Nashville Predators entered the playoffs as the fourth seed in the Western Conference with 106 points. San Jose qualified as the fifth seed earning 99 points during the regular season. This was the first playoff meeting between these two teams. Nashville won this year's four game regular season series earning six of eight points during the season.

The Sharks eliminated the Predators in five games. All four of the Predators goals in game one came on the power play as Nashville took the opening game 4–3. In game two San Jose scored three first period power play goals and Vesa Toskala earned a shutout in the Sharks 3–0 victory. San Jose captain Patrick Marleau scored twice in game three as the Sharks won 4–1. Nashville attempted to make a comeback late in game four as the Sharks hung on to win 5–4, Patrick Marleau recorded a hat trick in the victory. San Jose continued to exploit the Predators penalty killing in game five as they scored twice on the power play and ended Nashville's season with a 2–1 victory.

April 21	San Jose Sharks	3–4	Nashville Predators	Gaylord Entertainment Center	Recap
Mark Smith (1) – 04:12		First period	08:57 – pp – Mike Sillinger (1); 10:56 – pp – Martin Erat (1); 19:56 – pp – Shea Weber (1)
Nils Ekman (1) – pp – 08:50		Second period	No scoring
Scott Thornton (1) – 10:31		Third period	12:06 – pp – Adam Hall (1)
Vesa Toskala 26 saves / 30 shots		Goalie stats	Chris Mason 31 saves / 34 shots

April 23	San Jose Sharks	3–0	Nashville Predators	Gaylord Entertainment Center	Recap
Jonathan Cheechoo (1) – pp – 05:37; Patrick Marleau (1) – pp – 16:31; Mark Smith (2) – pp – 17:31		First period	No scoring
No scoring		Second period	No scoring
No scoring		Third period	No scoring
Vesa Toskala 25 saves / 25 shots		Goalie stats	Chris Mason 34 saves / 37 shots

April 25	Nashville Predators	1–4	San Jose Sharks	HP Pavilion	Recap
Kimmo Timonen (1) – sh – 06:33		First period	No scoring
No scoring		Second period	12:10 – Patrick Marleau (2); 18:48 – pp – Steve Bernier (1)
No scoring		Third period	15:38 – Jonathan Cheechoo (2); 16:45 – Patrick Marleau (3)
Chris Mason 36 saves / 40 shots		Goalie stats	Vesa Toskala 16 saves / 17 shots

April 27	Nashville Predators	4–5	San Jose Sharks	HP Pavilion	Recap
Paul Kariya (1) – pp – 08:55		First period	07:03 – Patrick Rissmiller (1)
Shea Weber (2) – 05:45		Second period	07:01 – pp – Patrick Marleau (4); 11:30 – pp – Patrick Marleau (5); 12:56 – Mark Smith (3)
Mike Sillinger (2) – 10:47; Scott Hartnell (1) – 15:38		Third period	04:13 – Patrick Marleau (6)
Chris Mason 19 saves / 24 shots		Goalie stats	Vesa Toskala 26 saves / 30 shots

April 30	San Jose Sharks	2–1	Nashville Predators	Gaylord Entertainment Center	Recap
Milan Michalek (1) – pp – 19:59		First period	No scoring
Patrick Marleau (7) – pp – 13:24		Second period	No scoring
No scoring		Third period	11:06 – pp – Paul Kariya (2)
Vesa Toskala 34 saves / 35 shots		Goalie stats	Chris Mason 34 saves / 36 shots

San Jose won series 4–1

== Conference semifinals ==
=== Eastern Conference semifinals ===
==== (1) Ottawa Senators vs. (4) Buffalo Sabres ====
This was the third playoff meeting between these two teams with Buffalo winning both previous series. They last met in the 1999 Eastern Conference quarterfinals where Buffalo won in four games. Ottawa won five of the eight games during this year's regular season series.

The Sabres eliminated the Senators in five games. Sabres forward Tim Connolly tied game one with just 10.7 seconds left in regulation to tie the game at six and Chris Drury ended the game just 18 seconds into overtime as Buffalo won 7–6. Ryan Miller faced 44 shots and allowed just one goal against as the Sabres won game two 2–1. Overtime was required in game three after Jason Spezza tied the game late in the third period. Jean-Pierre Dumont ended the game with a goal at 5:05 of the first overtime as the Sabres took the game 3–2. In game four Wade Redden scored a power-play goal early in the third period as the Senators earned a 2–1 victory. Sabres rookie forward Jason Pominville became the first player in league history to score a short-handed overtime goal to end a series as he scored just 2:26 into the first overtime as Buffalo won game five 3–2.

May 5	Buffalo Sabres	7–6	OT	Ottawa Senators	Scotiabank Place	Recap
Mike Grier (3) – 00:35; Teppo Numminen (1) – pp – 06:56		First period		03:05 – Jason Spezza (3); 03:20 – Bryan Smolinski (2)
Tim Connolly (4) – sh – 03:29; Derek Roy (2) – 19:30		Second period		01:47 – Martin Havlat (7); 04:15 – pp – Dany Heatley (3)
Derek Roy (3) – sh – 18:23; Tim Connolly (5) – 19:49		Third period		00:16 – Mike Fisher (2); 18:47 – pp – Bryan Smolinski (3)
Chris Drury (4) – 00:18		First overtime period		No scoring
Ryan Miller 27 saves / 33 shots		Goalie stats		Ray Emery 16 saves / 23 shots

May 8	Buffalo Sabres	2–1	Ottawa Senators	Scotiabank Place	Recap
No scoring		First period	No scoring
Jean-Pierre Dumont (5) – 03:33; Jochen Hecht (1) – 06:00		Second period	07:40 – Chris Phillips (2)
No scoring		Third period	No scoring
Ryan Miller 43 saves / 44 shots		Goalie stats	Ray Emery 15 saves / 17 shots

May 10	Ottawa Senators	2–3	OT	Buffalo Sabres	HSBC Arena	Recap
No scoring		First period		09:24 – pp – Chris Drury (5)
No scoring		Second period		No scoring
Jason Spezza (4) – pp – 05:47; Jason Spezza (5) – pp – 18:30		Third period		10:15 – Maxim Afinogenov (3)
No scoring		First overtime period		05:05 – Jean-Pierre Dumont (6)
Ray Emery 21 saves / 24 shots		Goalie stats		Ryan Miller 26 saves / 28 shots

May 11	Ottawa Senators	2–1	Buffalo Sabres	HSBC Arena	Recap
Brian Pothier (1) – 04:56		First period	No scoring
No scoring		Second period	16:18 – Daniel Briere (4)
Wade Redden (2) – pp – 02:52		Third period	No scoring
Ray Emery 29 saves / 30 shots		Goalie stats	Ryan Miller 26 saves / 28 shots

May 13	Buffalo Sabres	3–2	OT	Ottawa Senators	Scotiabank Place	Recap
Henrik Tallinder (1) – 00:33		First period		10:26 – pp – Daniel Alfredsson (2)
Chris Drury (6) – pp – 07:56		Second period		13:59 – Brian Pothier (2)
No scoring		Third period		No scoring
Jason Pominville (5) – sh – 02:26		First overtime period		No scoring
Ryan Miller 34 saves / 36 shots		Goalie stats		Ray Emery 21 saves / 24 shots

Buffalo won series 4–1

==== (2) Carolina Hurricanes vs. (3) New Jersey Devils ====
This was the third playoff meeting between these two teams with the teams splitting the two previous series. They last met in the 2002 Eastern Conference quarterfinals where Carolina won in six games. Carolina won this year's four game regular season series earning five of eight points during the season.

The Hurricanes defeated New Jersey in five games. Carolina scored five power-play goals in game one as they won 6–0. Scott Gomez gave the Devils a 2–1 lead with just over twenty seconds to go in the third period of game two, however just 18 seconds later Eric Staal scored the game-tying goal with just three seconds left in regulation time to send the game into overtime. Niclas Wallin tallied the game-winner 3:09 into the first overtime. In game three Carolina's Rod Brind'Amour scored the game-winner with 1:01 to play in the second period. New Jersey jumped out to a 5–0 lead and won game four with a final score of 5–1. Cory Stillman scored the series-winning goal at 14:20 of the second period as the Hurricanes held on for a 4–1 victory in game five.

May 6	New Jersey Devils	0–6	Carolina Hurricanes	RBC Center	Recap
No scoring		First period	11:37 – pp – Ray Whitney (2)
No scoring		Second period	02:58 – Ray Whitney (3); 17:32 – pp – Eric Staal (3); 18:06 – pp – Cory Stillman (3)
No scoring		Third period	12:07 – pp – Doug Weight (1); 13:07 – pp – Rod Brind'Amour (5)
Martin Brodeur 29 saves / 35 shots Scott Clemmensen 3 shots / 3 saves		Goalie stats	Cam Ward 21 saves / 21 shots

May 8	New Jersey Devils	2–3	OT	Carolina Hurricanes	RBC Center	Recap
Jamie Langenbrunner (3) – 06:20		First period		No scoring
No scoring		Second period		18:18 – pp – Mark Recchi (2)
Scott Gomez (3) – 19:39		Third period		19:57 – Eric Staal (4)
No scoring		First overtime period		03:09 – Niclas Wallin (1)
Martin Brodeur 35 saves / 38 shots		Goalie stats		Cam Ward 21 saves / 23 shots

May 10	Carolina Hurricanes	3–2	New Jersey Devils	Continental Airlines Arena	Recap
Matt Cullen (4) – pp – 08:16; Justin Williams (2) – 10:07		First period	02:57 – Sergei Brylin (1)
Rod Brind'Amour (6) – pp – 18:59		Second period	08:45 – pp – Patrik Elias (6)
No scoring		Third period	No scoring
Cam Ward 28 saves / 30 shots		Goalie stats	Martin Brodeur 21 saves / 24 shots

May 13	Carolina Hurricanes	1–5	New Jersey Devils	Continental Airlines Arena	Recap
No scoring		First period	01:58 – pp – Scott Gomez (4); 11:02 – sh – Jay Pandolfo (1); 19:00 – pp – Scott Gomez (5)
Mark Recchi (3) – 11:04		Second period	00:44 – Sergei Brylin (2); 04:23 – John Madden (4)
No scoring		Third period	No scoring
Cam Ward 13 saves / 17 shots Martin Gerber 15 saves / 16 shots		Goalie stats	Martin Brodeur 19 saves / 20 shots

May 14	New Jersey Devils	1–4	Carolina Hurricanes	RBC Center	Recap
Brian Gionta (3) – 00:57		First period	08:39 – Frantisek Kaberle (1)
No scoring		Second period	14:20 – pp – Cory Stillman (4)
No scoring		Third period	07:22 – Ray Whitney (4); 18:32 – en – Eric Staal (5)
Martin Brodeur 27 saves / 30 shots		Goalie stats	Cam Ward 17 saves / 18 shots

Carolina won series 4–1

=== Western Conference semifinals ===
==== (5) San Jose Sharks vs. (8) Edmonton Oilers ====
This was the first playoff meeting between these two teams. Edmonton won three of the four games during this year's regular season series.

The Oilers came back from a two-game deficit to defeat the Sharks in six games. Patrick Marleau recorded a goal and an assist during game one in a 2–1 San Jose victory. The Sharks won game two 2–1 with Joe Thornton scoring the game-winner on the power play in the second period. Sharks goaltender Vesa Toskala made 55 saves in a losing effort in game three as the Oilers won in a triple-overtime on a goal scored by Shawn Horcoff at 2:24 to give Edmonton a 3–2 win. Edmonton came back from an early 3–1 deficit in game four and scored five unanswered goals to win 6–3 and to even the series at two games apiece. After San Jose tied game five early the third period the Oilers scored three unanswered goals as they took another 6–3 victory. Dwayne Roloson posted a 24 save shutout in game six as the Oilers took the game 2–0 with the game-winning goal from Michael Peca to win the series four games to two.

May 7	Edmonton Oilers	1–2	San Jose Sharks	HP Pavilion	Recap
Jaroslav Spacek (3) – pp – 02:33		First period	07:42 – Patrick Marleau (8)
No scoring		Second period	03:14 – Christian Ehrhoff (1)
No scoring		Third period	No scoring
Dwayne Roloson 28 saves / 30 shots		Goalie stats	Vesa Toskala 15 saves / 16 shots

May 8	Edmonton Oilers	1–2	San Jose Sharks	HP Pavilion	Recap
No scoring		First period	04:26 – Tom Preissing (1)
Sergei Samsonov (2) – 15:23		Second period	17:29 – pp – Joe Thornton (1)
No scoring		Third period	No scoring
Dwayne Roloson 36 saves / 38 shots		Goalie stats	Vesa Toskala 24 saves / 25 shots

May 10	San Jose Sharks	2–3	3OT	Edmonton Oilers	Rexall Place	Recap
No scoring		First period		10:04 – pp – Marc-Andre Bergeron (1)
Patrick Marleau (9) – 01:19; Patrick Rissmiller (2) – 09:30		Second period		No scoring
No scoring		Third period		13:13 – Raffi Torres (2)
No scoring		Third overtime period		02:24 – Shawn Horcoff (2)
Vesa Toskala 55 saves / 58 shots		Goalie stats		Dwayne Roloson 32 saves / 34 shots

May 12	San Jose Sharks	3–6	Edmonton Oilers	Rexall Place	Recap
Joe Thornton (2) – 03:47; Nils Ekman (2) – 06:40		First period	12:55 – Shawn Horcoff (3)
Jonathan Cheechoo (3) – 09:02		Second period	12:28 – Michael Peca (1); 15:35 – Sergei Samsonov (3)
No scoring		Third period	02:57 – Jason Smith (1); 08:19 – Ales Hemsky (3); 14:00 – pp – Jarret Stoll (3)
Vesa Toskala 26 saves / 31 shots Evgeni Nabokov 3 saves / 4 shots		Goalie stats	Dwayne Roloson 22 saves / 25 shots

May 14	Edmonton Oilers	6–3	San Jose Sharks	HP Pavilion	Recap
Fernando Pisani (6) – 08:29		First period	No scoring
Ryan Smyth (3) – pp – 06:31		Second period	04:30 – Scott Thornton (2)
Shawn Horcoff (4) – sh – 00:12; Fernando Pisani (7) – 04:03; Jarret Stoll (4) – pp – 13:40; Ryan Smyth (4) – pp – 16:11		Third period	00:44 – pp – Christian Ehrhoff (2); 02:30 – Jonathan Cheechoo (4)
Dwayne Roloson 21 saves / 24 shots		Goalie stats	Vesa Toskala 12 saves / 18 shots

May 17	San Jose Sharks	0–2	Edmonton Oilers	Rexall Place	Recap
No scoring		First period	08:21 – Michael Peca (2)
No scoring		Second period	No scoring
No scoring		Third period	11:37 – Shawn Horcoff (5)
Vesa Toskala 24 saves / 26 shots		Goalie stats	Dwayne Roloson 24 saves / 24 shots

Edmonton won series 4–2

==== (6) Mighty Ducks of Anaheim vs. (7) Colorado Avalanche ====
This was the first playoff meeting between these two teams. Colorado won three of the four games during this year's regular season series.

Anaheim swept the Avalanche in four games. The Mighty Ducks scored four times in the second period of game one as Anaheim won 5–0, rookie Ilya Bryzgalov recorded his second-straight shutout. In game two Ilya Bryzgalov equalled a rookie record previously set by Frank McCool in 1945 as he recorded his third straight playoff shutout as the Mighty Ducks won 3–0. In game three Dan Hinote ended Ilya Bryzgalov's shutout streak at 249:15 (the second longest in league history) when he scored late in the first period for the Avalanche. Joffrey Lupul scored four goals including the overtime winner as the Mighty Ducks won 4–3. Joe Sakic scored the only goal for the Avalanche in game four as Anaheim finished off the series with a 4–1 victory to advance to their second Conference Final appearance in team history.

May 5	Colorado Avalanche	0–5	Mighty Ducks of Anaheim	Arrowhead Pond of Anaheim	Recap
No scoring		First period	No scoring
No scoring		Second period	02:38 – Samuel Pahlsson (2); 10:24 – Chris Kunitz (2); 19:05 – Teemu Selanne (4); 19:54 – pp – Joffrey Lupul (2)
No scoring		Third period	11:07 – Travis Moen (1)
Jose Theodore 29 saves / 34 shots		Goalie stats	Ilya Bryzgalov 29 saves / 29 shots

May 7	Colorado Avalanche	0–3	Mighty Ducks of Anaheim	Arrowhead Pond of Anaheim	Recap
No scoring		First period	18:17 – pp – Ryan Getzlaf (2)
No scoring		Second period	04:41 – Ruslan Salei (2); 12:24 – Joffrey Lupul (3)
No scoring		Third period	No scoring
Jose Theodore 32 saves / 35 shots		Goalie stats	Ilya Bryzgalov 22 saves / 22 shots

May 9	Mighty Ducks of Anaheim	4–3	OT	Colorado Avalanche	Pepsi Center	Recap
No scoring		First period		19:33 – Dan Hinote (1)
Joffrey Lupul (4) – 09:02		Second period		No scoring
Joffrey Lupul (5) – 08:54; Joffrey Lupul (6) – 10:40		Third period		04:47 – sh – Jim Dowd (2); 13:35 – Rob Blake (3)
Joffrey Lupul (7) – 16:30		First overtime period		No scoring
Ilya Bryzgalov 26 saves / 29 shots		Goalie stats		Jose Theodore 35 saves / 39 shots

May 11	Mighty Ducks of Anaheim	4–1	Colorado Avalanche	Pepsi Center	Recap
Todd Marchant (1) – 16:52		First period	02:17 – Joe Sakic (4)
Teemu Selanne (5) – 02:22		Second period	No scoring
Dustin Penner (1) – 06:07; Todd Marchant (2) – en – 18:21		Third period	No scoring
Ilya Bryzgalov 40 saves / 41 shots		Goalie stats	Jose Theodore 30 saves / 33 shots

Anaheim won series 4–0

== Conference finals ==
=== Eastern Conference final ===
==== (2) Carolina Hurricanes vs. (4) Buffalo Sabres ====
This was the first playoff meeting between these two teams. Carolina most recently made it to the conference finals in 2002, defeating Toronto in six games, while the Sabres last made it to the conference finals in 1999, defeating Toronto in five games. Carolina won three of the four games in this year's four game regular season series.

The Hurricanes eliminated the Sabres in seven games. Sabres goaltender Ryan Miller made 29 saves in game one as Buffalo won 3–2. Ray Whitney scored twice in the second period of game two as the Hurricanes evened the series with a 4–3 victory. The Sabres scored four times in just over thirteen minutes in game three as they earned a 4–3 win. Martin Gerber made 22 saves in a shutout victory for the Hurricanes as they took game four by a score of 4–0. Cam Ward replaced Martin Gerber early in the second period of game five as the Hurricanes came back from a two-goal deficit and won the game 4–3 on a power-play goal scored by Cory Stillman at 8:46 of the first overtime period. Daniel Briere forced a seventh game in this series with his game-winning goal at 4:22 of the first overtime as Buffalo won game six 2–1. Hurricanes forward Rod Brind'Amour capitalised on a delay of game penalty to Brian Campbell to score the game-winning goal at 11:22 of the third period in game seven as Carolina advanced to the Stanley Cup Finals with a 4–2 victory. Game 7 marked the most recent time the Hurricanes won a game in the Conference Finals until 2025, as they were swept out of the conference finals in 2009, 2019, and 2023. Game 7 also marked the last time the Buffalo Sabres played under the black and red colours before returning to the blue and yellow as its main colours with a completely new logo.

May 20	Buffalo Sabres	3–2	Carolina Hurricanes	RBC Center	Recap
Henrik Tallinder (2) – 02:56		First period	12:11 – Rod Brind'Amour (7)
Daniel Briere (5) – 09:41		Second period	No scoring
Jay McKee (2) – 13:40		Third period	17:07 – sh – Mike Commodore (1)
Ryan Miller 29 saves / 31 shots		Goalie stats	Cam Ward 24 saves / 27 shots

May 22	Buffalo Sabres	3–4	Carolina Hurricanes	RBC Center	Recap
Thomas Vanek (2) – pp – 19:12		First period	10:05 – pp – Frantisek Kaberle (2)
No scoring		Second period	06:03 – pp – Ray Whitney (5); 12:58 – Ray Whitney (6)
Chris Drury (7) – pp – 11:39; Derek Roy (4) – pp – 19:57		Third period	06:58 – Justin Williams (3)
Ryan Miller 31 saves / 35 shots		Goalie stats	Cam Ward 16 saves / 19 shots

May 24	Carolina Hurricanes	3–4	Buffalo Sabres	HSBC Arena	Recap
Cory Stillman (5) – 14:07		First period	19:30 – pp – Chris Drury (8)
Cory Stillman (6) – 18:18		Second period	01:02 – pp – Daniel Briere (6); 08:28 – Daniel Briere (7); 12:55 – Ales Kotalik (4)
Eric Staal (6) – pp – 15:52		Third period	No scoring
Cam Ward 22 saves / 26 shots Martin Gerber 7 saves / 7 shots		Goalie stats	Ryan Miller 24 saves / 27 shots

May 26	Carolina Hurricanes	4–0	Buffalo Sabres	HSBC Arena	Recap
Mark Recchi (4) – 06:54; Eric Staal (7) – pp – 09:53		First period	No scoring
Andrew Ladd (1) – 02:10		Second period	No scoring
Bret Hedican (1) – 16:03		Third period	No scoring
Martin Gerber 22 saves / 22 shots		Goalie stats	Ryan Miller 17 saves / 21 shots

May 28	Buffalo Sabres	3–4	OT	Carolina Hurricanes	RBC Center	Recap
Chris Drury (9) – 07:08; Derek Roy (5) – 17:32		First period		07:25 – Justin Williams (4)
Toni Lydman (1) – 01:55		Second period		05:21 – Mark Recchi (5); 10:04 – pp – Rod Brind'Amour (8)
No scoring		Third period		No scoring
No scoring		First overtime period		08:46 – pp – Cory Stillman (7)
Ryan Miller 22 saves / 26 shots		Goalie stats		Martin Gerber 8 saves / 11 shots Cam Ward 15 saves / 15 shots

May 30	Carolina Hurricanes	1–2	OT	Buffalo Sabres	HSBC Arena	Recap
No scoring		First period		04:56 – J.P. Dumont (7)
No scoring		Second period		No scoring
Bret Hedican (2) – 16:07		Third period		No scoring
No scoring		First overtime period		04:22 – pp – Daniel Briere (8)
Cam Ward 29 saves / 31 shots		Goalie stats		Ryan Miller 25 saves / 26 shots

June 1	Buffalo Sabres	2–4	Carolina Hurricanes	RBC Center	Recap
No scoring		First period	12:05 – Mike Commodore (2)
Doug Janik (1) – 15:50; Jochen Hecht (2) – 19:55		Second period	No scoring
No scoring		Third period	01:34 – Doug Weight (2); 11:22 – pp – Rod Brind'Amour (9); 19:08 – Justin Williams (5)
Ryan Miller 24 saves / 28 shots		Goalie stats	Cam Ward 22 saves / 24 shots

Carolina won series 4–3

=== Western Conference final ===
==== (6) Mighty Ducks of Anaheim vs. (8) Edmonton Oilers ====
This was the first playoff meeting between these two teams. Anaheim most recently made it to the conference finals in 2003, sweeping the Minnesota Wild in four games, while the Oilers last made it to the conference finals in 1992, losing to Chicago in four games. Edmonton won all four games during this year's regular season series.

The Oilers eliminated Anaheim in five games. Ales Hemsky's power-play goal at 11:35 of the second period gave the Oilers the lead as they took game one 3–1. Oilers goaltender Dwayne Roloson made 33 saves won again by a score of 3–1. Fernando Pisani scored the game-winning goal for the Oilers in game three as the two teams traded eight goals in the third period and Edmonton hung on for a 5–4 victory. Anaheim changed goaltenders before the start of game four as Jean-Sebastien Giguere got the start for the Mighty Ducks. Anaheim took a three-goal lead in the first period and never looked back winning the game 6–3. Dwayne Roloson made 32 saves as the Oilers ended the series with a 2–1 victory in game five. The Oilers became the first eighth-seeded team to reach the Finals under this playoff format (which was introduced in 1994). Anaheim changed their team nickname, uniforms and logo after the season as they became known as the Anaheim Ducks. This was the last time the Oilers made the conference finals until 2022.

May 19	Edmonton Oilers	3–1	Mighty Ducks of Anaheim	Arrowhead Pond of Anaheim	Recap
Michael Peca (3) – sh – 18:35		First period	19:03 – pp – Andy McDonald (2)
Ales Hemsky (4) – pp – 11:35		Second period	No scoring
Todd Harvey (1) – en – 19:18		Third period	No scoring
Dwayne Roloson 31 saves / 32 shots		Goalie stats	Ilya Bryzgalov 23 saves / 25 shots

May 21	Edmonton Oilers	3–1	Mighty Ducks of Anaheim	Arrowhead Pond of Anaheim	Recap
Chris Pronger (3) – pp – 13:08		First period	No scoring
Fernando Pisani (8) – 17:09		Second period	06:12 – Jeff Friesen (3)
Michael Peca (4) – en – 19:42		Third period	No scoring
Dwayne Roloson 33 saves / 34 shots		Goalie stats	Ilya Bryzgalov 22 saves / 24 shots

May 23	Mighty Ducks of Anaheim	4–5	Edmonton Oilers	Rexall Place	Recap
No scoring		First period	13:47 – Toby Petersen (1)
No scoring		Second period	No scoring
Sean O'Donnell (2) – 07:15; Teemu Selanne (6) – 09:13; Chris Kunitz (3) – 11:15; Todd Marchant (3) – 18:15		Third period	02:19 – Michael Peca (5); 03:35 – pp – Steve Staios (1); 04:40 – pp – Chris Pronger (4); 14:14 – Fernando Pisani (9)
Ilya Bryzgalov 17 saves / 22 shots		Goalie stats	Dwayne Roloson 34 saves / 38 shots

May 25	Mighty Ducks of Anaheim	6–3	Edmonton Oilers	Rexall Place	Recap
Dustin Penner (2) – 07:28; Dustin Penner (3) – 15:11; Ryan Getzlaf (3) – pp – 19:18		First period	No scoring
Ruslan Salei (3) – 05:42; Joffrey Lupul (8) – 18:22		Second period	03:30 – pp – Marc-Andre Bergeron (2); 07:46 – Ryan Smyth (5); 10:01 – Georges Laraque (1)
Joffrey Lupul (9) – en – 18:50		Third period	No scoring
Jean-Sebastien Giguere 20 saves / 23 shots		Goalie stats	Dwayne Roloson 40 saves / 45 shots

May 27	Edmonton Oilers	2–1	Mighty Ducks of Anaheim	Arrowhead Pond of Anaheim	Recap
No scoring		First period	07:30 – pp – Francois Beauchemin (3)
Ethan Moreau (1) – 03:42; Raffi Torres (3) – 08:31		Second period	No scoring
No scoring		Third period	No scoring
Dwayne Roloson 32 saves / 33 shots		Goalie stats	Jean-Sebastien Giguere 23 saves / 25 shots

Edmonton won series 4–1

== Stanley Cup Finals ==
This was the first playoff meeting between these two teams. Carolina made their second Finals appearance, while Edmonton made their seventh appearance in the Finals. The Hurricanes were defeated in their last appearance in the Finals losing to Detroit in five games in 2002, the Oilers won their last appearance in the Finals defeating Boston in five games in 1990. The teams did not meet during the regular season. This series marked the first time that two former World Hockey Association teams played against each other for the Stanley Cup since they merged with the NHL in 1979. This was the first Stanley Cup Finals to be contested by two teams that had both missed the playoffs the previous season.

June 5	Edmonton Oilers	4–5	Carolina Hurricanes	RBC Center	Recap
Fernando Pisani (10) – 08:18		First period	No scoring
Chris Pronger (5) – ps – 10:36; Ethan Moreau (2) – 16:23		Second period	17:17 – Rod Brind'Amour (10)
Ales Hemsky (5) – pp – 13:31		Third period	01:40 – Ray Whitney (7); 05:09 – pp – Ray Whitney (8); 10:02 – sh – Justin Williams (6); 19:28 – Rod Brind'Amour (11)
Dwayne Roloson 19 saves / 23 shots Ty Conklin 2 saves / 3 shots		Goalie stats	Cam Ward 34 saves / 38 shots

June 7	Edmonton Oilers	0–5	Carolina Hurricanes	RBC Center	Recap
No scoring		First period	06:21 – Andrew Ladd (2)
No scoring		Second period	10:28 – pp – Frantisek Kaberle (3); 19:57 – Cory Stillman (8)
No scoring		Third period	02:21 – pp – Doug Weight (3); 04:12 – pp – Mark Recchi (6)
Jussi Markkanen 21 saves / 26 shots		Goalie stats	Cam Ward 25 saves / 25 shots

June 10	Carolina Hurricanes	1–2	Edmonton Oilers	Rexall Place	Recap
No scoring		First period	02:31 – Shawn Horcoff (6)
No scoring		Second period	No scoring
Rod Brind'Amour (12) – 09:09		Third period	17:45 – Ryan Smyth (6)
Cam Ward 28 saves / 30 shots		Goalie stats	Jussi Markkanen 24 saves / 25 shots

June 12	Carolina Hurricanes	2–1	Edmonton Oilers	Rexall Place	Recap
Cory Stillman (9) – pp – 09:09		First period	08:40 – Sergei Samsonov (4)
Mark Recchi (7) – 15:56		Second period	No scoring
No scoring		Third period	No scoring
Cam Ward 20 saves / 21 shots		Goalie stats	Jussi Markkanen 18 saves / 20 shots

June 14	Edmonton Oilers	4–3	OT	Carolina Hurricanes	RBC Center	Recap
Fernando Pisani (11) – 00:16; Ales Hemsky (6) – pp – 13:25; Michael Peca (6) – 19:42		First period		05:54 – pp – Eric Staal (8); 10:16 – pp – Ray Whitney (9)
No scoring		Second period		09:56 – pp – Eric Staal (9)
No scoring		Third period		No scoring
Fernando Pisani (12) – sh – 03:31		First overtime period		No scoring
Jussi Markkanen 21 saves / 24 shots		Goalie stats		Cam Ward 25 saves / 29 shots

June 17	Carolina Hurricanes	0–4	Edmonton Oilers	Rexall Place	Recap
No scoring		First period	No scoring
No scoring		Second period	01:45 – pp – Fernando Pisani (13); 09:54 – Raffi Torres (4)
No scoring		Third period	03:04 – pp – Ryan Smyth (7); 13:05 – pp – Shawn Horcoff (7)
Cam Ward 30 saves / 34 shots		Goalie stats	Jussi Markkanen 16 saves / 16 shots

June 19	Edmonton Oilers	1–3	Carolina Hurricanes	RBC Center	Recap
No scoring		First period	01:26 – Aaron Ward (2)
No scoring		Second period	04:18 – pp – Frantisek Kaberle (4)
Fernando Pisani (14) – 01:03		Third period	18:59 – en – Justin Williams (7)
Jussi Markkanen 24 saves / 26 shots		Goalie stats	Cam Ward 22 saves / 23 shots

Carolina won series 4–3

== Player statistics ==
=== Skaters ===
GP = Games played; G = Goals; A = Assists; Pts = Points; +/– = Plus/minus; PIM = Penalty minutes

Player	Team	GP	G	A	Pts	+/–	PIM
Eric Staal	Carolina Hurricanes	25	9	19	28	0	8
Cory Stillman	Carolina Hurricanes	25	9	17	26	+12	14
Chris Pronger	Edmonton Oilers	24	5	16	21	+10	26
Daniel Briere	Buffalo Sabres	18	8	11	19	0	12
Shawn Horcoff	Edmonton Oilers	24	7	12	19	+4	12
Fernando Pisani	Edmonton Oilers	24	14	4	18	+4	10
Rod Brind'Amour	Carolina Hurricanes	25	12	6	18	+9	16
Chris Drury	Buffalo Sabres	18	9	9	18	+5	10
Justin Williams	Carolina Hurricanes	25	7	11	18	+12	34
Matt Cullen	Carolina Hurricanes	25	4	14	18	+2	12

=== Goaltending ===
These are the top five goaltenders based on either goals against average or save percentage with at least four games played.

GP = Games played; W = Wins; L = Losses; SA = Shots against; GA = Goals against; GAA = Goals against average; TOI = Time On Ice (minutes:seconds); Sv% = Save percentage; SO = Shutouts

Player	Team	GP	W	L	SA	GA	GAA	Min	Sv%	SO
Ilya Bryzgalov	Mighty Ducks of Anaheim	11	6	4	285	16	1.46	658:59	.944	3
Cristobal Huet	Montreal Canadiens	6	2	4	212	15	2.33	385:37	.929	0
Dwayne Roloson	Edmonton Oilers	18	12	5	618	45	2.33	1159:43	.927	1
Martin Brodeur	New Jersey Devils	9	5	4	261	20	2.25	532:59	.923	1
Miikka Kiprusoff	Calgary Flames	7	3	4	202	16	2.24	427:59	.921	0
Cam Ward	Carolina Hurricanes	23	15	8	584	47	2.14	1319:53	.920	2
Jussi Markkanen	Edmonton Oilers	6	3	3	137	13	2.17	360:23	.905	1

== See also ==
- 2005–06 NHL season
- List of NHL seasons

Preceded by 2004 Stanley Cup playoffs	Stanley Cup playoffs	Succeeded by 2007 Stanley Cup playoffs
