= Sheldon Souray =

Canadian ice hockey player (born 1976)

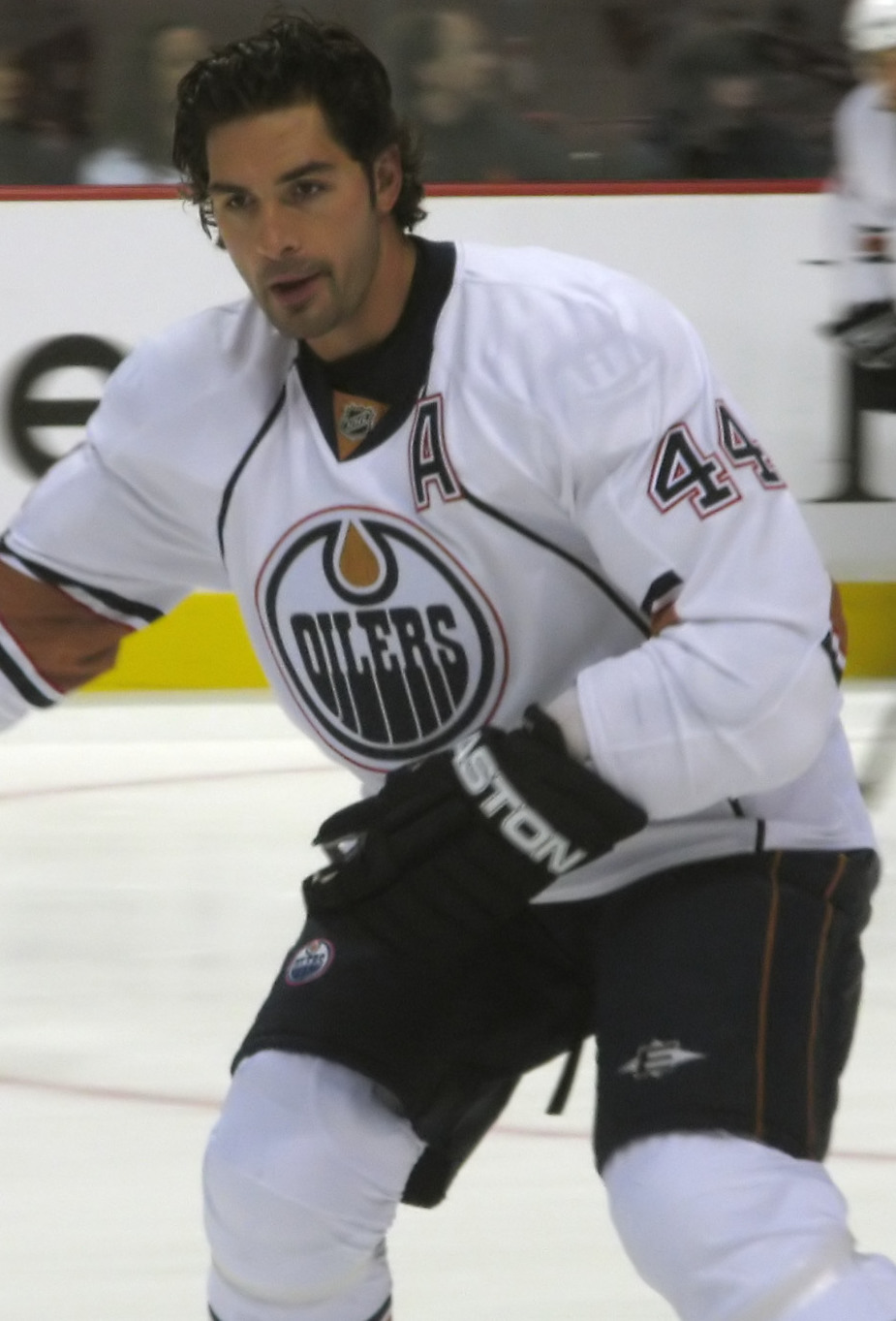
- Souray with the Edmonton Oilers in 2007
- Born: July 13, 1976 (age 50) Elk Point, Alberta, Canada
- Height: 6 ft 4 in (193 cm)
- Weight: 237 lb (108 kg; 16 st 13 lb)
- Position: Defence
- Shot: Left
- Played for: New Jersey Devils; Montreal Canadiens; Edmonton Oilers; Hershey Bears; Dallas Stars; Anaheim Ducks
- National team: Canada
- NHL draft: 71st overall, 1994; New Jersey Devils
- Playing career: 1995–2013

Sheldon Souray (born July 13, 1976) is a Canadian former professional ice hockey defenceman who played 14 seasons in the National Hockey League (NHL) for the New Jersey Devils, Montreal Canadiens, Edmonton Oilers, Dallas Stars, and Anaheim Ducks. He was best known for his heavy slapshot, once setting a previous unofficial NHL record for the hardest recorded shot at the Oilers' 2009 Skills Competition.

== Playing career ==
=== New Jersey Devils (1997–2000) ===
Before playing in the NHL, Sheldon was a member of the Fort Saskatchewan Traders in the Alberta Junior Hockey League (AJHL). He was drafted in the 1994 NHL entry draft in the third round, 71st overall, by the New Jersey Devils. Souray reported to his second Devils training camp overweight and out-of-shape, prompting general manager Lou Lamoriello to tell him that he would never play for the team if it happened again. Souray credits Lamoriello for calling him out, and says it was exactly what he needed to succeed at such a high level. He made his NHL debut in the 1997–98 season. He finished his rookie season with modest scoring totals of three goals and ten points in 60 games, but most importantly established that he was capable of being an NHL regular. He scored his first NHL goal on a powerful slapshot late in a December 16, 1997, game against the rival New York Rangers to break a 3–3 tie late in the third period and send the Devils to a 4–3 win. Souray played in New Jersey from 1997 to midway through the 1999–2000 season, earning a reputation as a big, steady, physical defender with a mean streak and a hard shot. However, with the Devils preparing to make their Stanley Cup run late in the 1999–2000 season and believing they needed more offence from the blue line, Souray was traded to the Montreal Canadiens on March 1, 2000, in exchange for Vladimir Malakhov.

=== Montreal Canadiens (2000–2007) ===
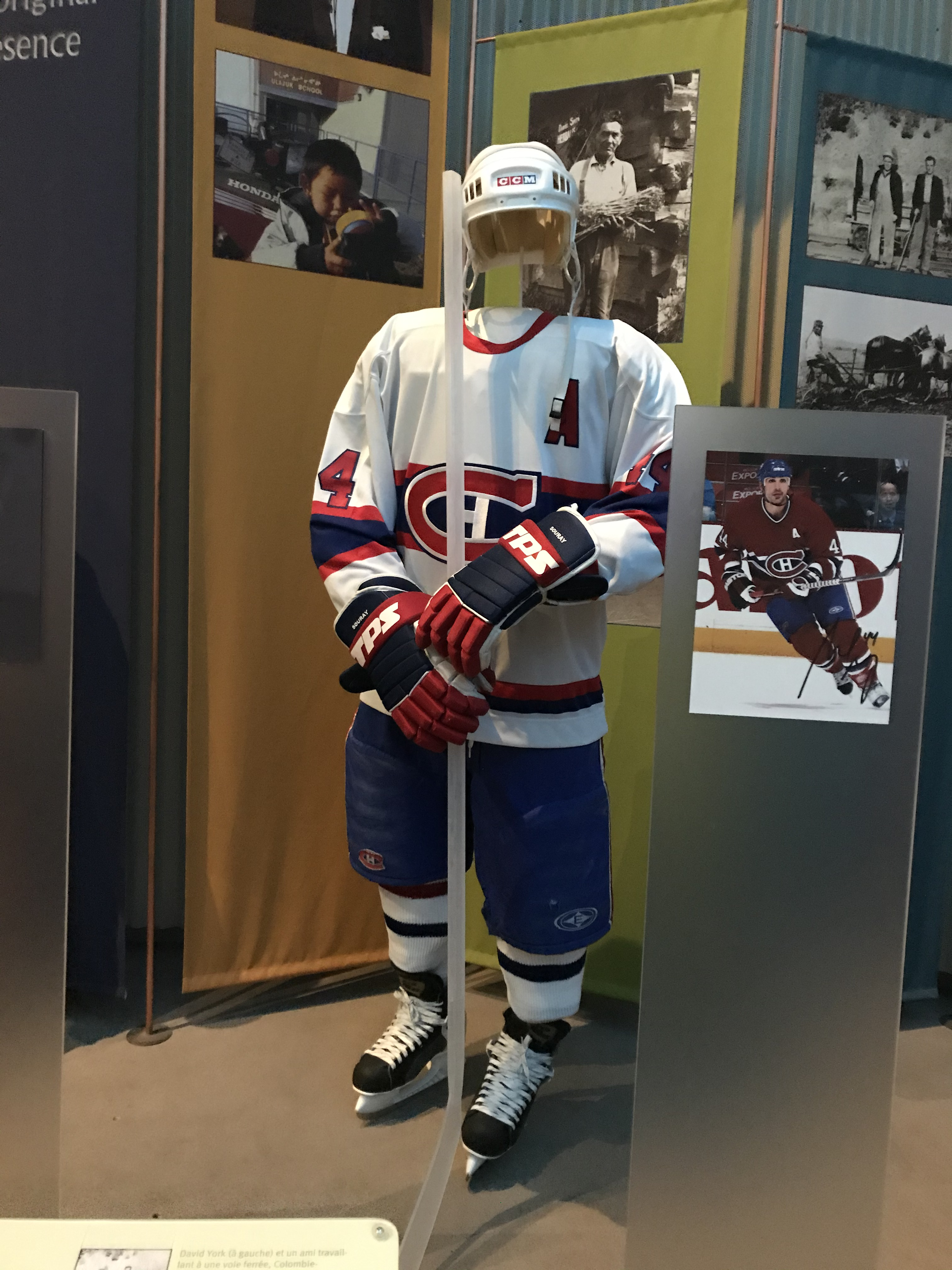
Souray's uniform on display at the Canadian Museum of History.

Souray's offence began to improve following his trade to the Canadiens. At the time of his trade from the Devils, he had just eight points, all assists. He finished with three goals in 19 games as a Canadien to tie his career best for goals in a season, and establish a new career best for points (11) in 71 combined games. More importantly, he began using his dangerous shot more often once he arrived in Montreal. In 2000–01, injuries limited him to just 52 games, 19 less than the previous year, but Souray still managed to match his previous season's career bests in goals (3), assists (8) and points. He got off to a good start in 2001–02, threatening to surpass his previous offensive highs, as he tallied three goals and five assists in just 34 games while fighting through an injury-plagued campaign. 2001–02 also saw him record his first career power play goal, as the Canadiens began to realize the value of having a player on the point who could consistently shoot the puck as hard as Souray. However, he suffered a wrist injury that plagued him throughout the year, and though he would play through it much of the season, Souray would eventually shut it down at the end of the season.

The severity of the wrist injury kept him out the entire 2002–03 season while he recovered and regained his strength. However, in 2003–04, Souray returned to play for the Canadiens and had a breakout season, amassing a surprising 15 goals and 35 points. He had exceeded expectations with the sudden development of his offensive game, especially given his reputation as a defence-first rearguard throughout his NHL career up to that point. This was of course possible because his powerful slapshot had returned along with his health, he was using his shot more often than ever before, and the Canadiens were giving him plenty of scoring opportunities by using him on the power play and increasing his overall ice time. During this season, he participated in the 2004 All-Star Game for the first time, and shared a win in the Skills Competition's hardest shot contest. Both he and Adrian Aucoin recorded blasts of 102.2 mph in the event. During the 2004–05 NHL lockout, he played for Färjestad BK of the Swedish Elitserien. While in Sweden, Souray wrote a correspondence in the Montreal Gazette with the assistance of hockey writer Dave Stubbs. The correspondence chronicled Souray's experience in a new country, and the different style of play that is popular overseas compared to the North American style of play. He also had the chance to represent his home country internationally by playing for Team Canada in the 2005 IIHF World Championships. Due to the lockout, this tournament featured a much higher percentage than usual of NHL players, of which Souray was one.

Souray returned from the lockout to post a successful 2005–06, with 12 goals and a new career best 39 points. However, in 2006–07, Souray emerged as a top-tier defence man in the NHL with a career-best 26 goals, 38 assists and 64 points, placing second in team-scoring in both goals and points, and third in assists, a remarkable achievement for a defenceman. His slapshot's reputation continued to grow throughout the League, to the point it could inspire fear in opposing players. It was so successful that season, Souray even used it in a shootout as a decoy in a December 2, 2006 game. That goal, scored on Toronto Maple Leafs goaltender Andrew Raycroft in the shootout, stood as the eventual winner in a 4–3 Montreal victory. On April 5, 2007, Souray broke the NHL single-season record for most powerplay goals scored by a defenceman with his 19th of the season. The record was previously shared by Denis Potvin of the New York Islanders (1974–75) and Adrian Aucoin of the Vancouver Canucks (1998–99). Souray was named to his second NHL All-Star Game that season, this time as a starter, and posted the second-hardest slapshot at the Skills Competition with a 100.0 mph shot, finishing as runner-up to event winner Zdeno Chára (100.4 mph). It was a banner year for Souray, as he led all NHL defencemen in goals and finished third in points, behind only Scott Niedermayer and Sergei Gonchar. Entering into the 2007 off-season, it was clear that Souray would be one of the top available defencemen as an unrestricted free agent.

=== Edmonton Oilers (2007–2011) ===
In the off-season, Souray became an unrestricted free agent and, on July 12, 2007, he signed a five-year, $27 million contract with the Edmonton Oilers, his favourite team growing up. However, his debut season with the Oilers was not the dream he imagined, as injuries limited him to only 26 games played. Already recovering from a shoulder injury when he entered training camp, Souray played through it, but reinjured the shoulder just six games into the season in a fight, and missed the next 55 games.

In 2008–09, he bounced back from the injury-shortened campaign to record 23 goals and 53 points and once again become an NHL All-Star. He finished third in the hardest shot competition that year, clocking in at 102.3 mph, behind Shea Weber (103.4) of the Nashville Predators, and winner Zdeno Chára (105.4) of the Boston Bruins. But during the Oilers' own 2009 Skills Competition, on January 4, Souray set the then-unofficial NHL record for the hardest shot. Clocked at 106.7 mph, his slapshot beat Chad Kilger's old unofficial record of 106.6 mph set at the Toronto Maple Leafs' 2006 Skills Competition. The record was deemed unofficial, however, as the League does not recognize individual team Skills Competitions and instead goes by the NHL All-Star Game's Skills Competition results. Souray's unofficial shot was not surpassed until January 28, 2012, by Chára, whose 108.8 mph slapshot in the Skills Competition preceding the 2012 All-Star Game beat Souray's blast and set the official record. Souray also earned a humorous nickname during his strong 2008–09 season, when during the third period of a 5–2 victory over the Dallas Stars on December 3, 2008, the Stars' broadcast team referred to Souray as the "Studly Wonderbomb" as a recognition of his slapshot's prowess.

In 2009–10, injuries resurfaced. On October 8, 2009, just three games into the season, Souray suffered a concussion after Calgary Flames captain Jarome Iginla checked him into the boards head-first, causing him to miss the next 16 games. Then, on January 30, 2010, in a rematch against the Flames, Souray fought Iginla, resulting in a Boxer's fracture in his right hand, requiring surgery taking him out for the remainder of the season finishing 19th four goals and nine assists for 13 points in 37 contests played. Shortly after getting the surgery, Souray developed a staph infection involving his bones and blood within the injured hand, which potentially putting him at risk of his hand getting amputated. Luckily, an amputation was never performed but the effects required Souray to spend three days in the ICU and was required to carry an IV bag for the next 12 weeks.

During the 2010 off-season, citing irreconcilable differences with Oiler management due to their handling of his various ailments, Souray requested a trade out of Edmonton. The Oilers responded angrily, and a nasty media exchange followed, with the team ultimately placing Souray on waivers in the hope that he would be claimed by another NHL team so that Edmonton would no longer be on the hook for the remainder of his contract. However, due to his high salary and previous year's injuries, few NHL teams were willing to take such a large financial risk on a player who might not be 100% healthy, talented as he may be. Souray cleared waivers without being claimed, and was told by management not to attend the Oilers' training camp. On October 6, 2010, Souray was assigned to the American Hockey League (AHL), being loaned to the Washington Capitals' minor league affiliate, the Hershey Bears. Souray accepted his demotion to the minors and posted a solid AHL season, as he battled and slowly recovered from his nagging injuries. Leading up to the NHL trade deadline, the Oilers once again placed Souray on waivers in a second attempt to unload his salary. However, NHL teams still had the same concerns about Souray's high salary and injury risk, so he cleared waivers a second time and remained under contract to Edmonton as relations between Souray and the Edmonton camp remained testy at best. Finally, in the summer of 2011, Edmonton bought-out the fifth and final year of Souray's contract. This allowed Souray to become a free agent and again pursue playing at the NHL level with another team.

=== Dallas Stars (2011–2012) ===
After becoming a free agent, Souray was signed by the Dallas Stars on July 1, 2011, to a one-year contract. Having recovered from his injuries, Souray made a successful comeback with the Stars, taking on more of a defensive role than in the recent past, particularly at even strength. However, he continued to still see plenty of ice time on the power play, where his slapshot could wreak havoc for opposing goaltenders, and was encouraged to use his shot as before. The Stars, meanwhile, while recognizing Souray's physical style, also openly declared that in order to preserve his health, they did not want him fighting very often, although they did not go so far as to dictate directly for him to never do so. On November 4, 2011, Souray reached a milestone when he scored the 100th NHL goal of his career in a 7–6 win over the Colorado Avalanche. Fittingly, it was a power play goal scored with a slapshot. Souray earned the respect of fans, teammates and local media in Dallas very quickly for his physical style of play and booming shot, and restored some of the goodwill that had been lost due to his spat with the Oilers. Most importantly, Souray was regularly healthy again. Despite missing a handful of games after sustaining an ankle injury blocking a shot in a December 23, 2011, win over the Nashville Predators, he had returned to the Dallas lineup by early January and was again a contributing member of their blueline corps. He finished the 2011–12 season with six goals, 15 assists and 21 points in 64 games.

=== Anaheim Ducks (2012–2013) ===
On July 1, 2012, Souray signed a three-year, $11 million contract with the Anaheim Ducks. During the lockout-shortened 2012–13 season, he remained healthy and carried his strong defensive play over from Dallas, posting a career-best plus-minus rating of +19. He also continued to use his powerful shot to the tune of seven goals and ten assists in 44 games as the Ducks qualified for the 2013 Stanley Cup playoffs. For Souray, this was the first time since 2005–06 that he was part of the Stanley Cup playoffs. His final point of the regular season, an assist in a 3–2 overtime loss to the Columbus Blue Jackets on April 17, 2013, was also a personal milestone for Souray, his 300th career NHL point. By January 2014, Souray was placed on the injured reserve list with a shoulder/wrist injury. He appeared on their roster until he announced his retirement on June 30, 2015 after two years of being an unrestricted free agent.

== Awards ==
- WHL West Second All-Star Team – 1996
- Played in the NHL All-Star Game in 2004, 2007 (starter), and 2009;
- Won the Hardest Shot at the NHL All-Star Skills Competition in 2004, along with co-winner Adrian Aucoin;
- Won the Hardest Shot at the Edmonton Oilers Skills Competition in 2009.

== Records ==
- NHL record for most single-season power-play goals by a defenceman, 19, in 2006–07 (surpassed Denis Potvin and Adrian Aucoin — 18);
- Edmonton Oilers team record for fastest two goals ever scored in a regular season game: span of seven seconds (shared with Aleš Hemský);
- Montreal Canadiens team record for most points by a defenceman in one game, with six (one goal and five assists).

== Personal life ==
Souray was born in Elk Point, Alberta, to Richard Souray and Lillian Parenteau. He is of Métis descent and has one sister who is two years older. At a young age, Souray moved with his family from Fishing Lake Métis Settlement to a small community in Alberta in order for his sister to attend school. In another two years, they moved again so that Souray could play organized sports. While still in elementary school, Souray's parents divorced; he first lived with his mother before moving in with his father at age nine. Growing up, he attended Archbishop O'Leary Catholic High School with former fellow Oiler Fernando Pisani. Souray has a tattoo of a Métis Chief in full headdress on his arm. He says the tattoo is meant as a reminder to himself to be a positive role model for Native and Métis children, as he himself is proud of his Métis heritage.

Souray was married to former Baywatch actress Angelica Bridges from 2002 to 2007. They have two daughters.

In 2011, Souray began dating American professional wrestler and model Barbie Blank, best known for her time in WWE under the ring name "Kelly Kelly", after having met at a Maxim party. They got married on February 27, 2016 in Cabo San Lucas, Mexico, and split time between Las Vegas, Nevada and Los Angeles, California. The couple divorced in 2017.

In August 2020, Souray got engaged to American model Tess Annique. They got married on September 12, 2021. They have one son and currently reside in Las Vegas.

Souray is co-owner, along with former NHL goaltender Martin Brodeur and Montreal restaurateur Andrea Dell'Orefice, of a Rivière-des-Prairies pizzeria.

== Career statistics ==
=== Regular season and playoffs ===
			Regular season					Playoffs
Season	Team	League	GP	G	A	Pts	PIM	GP	G	A	Pts	PIM
1992–93	Fort Saskatchewan Traders	AJHL	35	0	3	3	116	—	—	—	—	—
1992–93	Tri-City Americans	WHL	2	0	0	0	0	—	—	—	—	—
1993–94	Tri-City Americans	WHL	42	3	6	9	122	—	—	—	—	—
1994–95	Tri-City Americans	WHL	40	2	24	26	140	—	—	—	—	—
1994–95	Prince George Cougars	WHL	11	2	3	5	23	—	—	—	—	—
1994–95	Albany River Rats	AHL	7	0	2	2	8	—	—	—	—	—
1995–96	Prince George Cougars	WHL	32	9	18	27	91	—	—	—	—	—
1995–96	Kelowna Rockets	WHL	27	7	20	27	94	6	0	5	5	2
1995–96	Albany River Rats	AHL	6	0	2	2	12	4	0	1	1	4
1996–97	Albany River Rats	AHL	70	2	11	13	160	16	2	3	5	47
1997–98	Albany River Rats	AHL	6	0	0	0	8	—	—	—	—	—
1997–98	New Jersey Devils	NHL	60	3	7	10	85	3	0	1	1	2
1998–99	New Jersey Devils	NHL	70	1	7	8	110	2	0	1	1	0
1999–2000	New Jersey Devils	NHL	52	0	8	8	70	—	—	—	—	—
1999–2000	Montreal Canadiens	NHL	19	3	0	3	44	—	—	—	—	—
2000–01	Montreal Canadiens	NHL	52	3	8	11	95	—	—	—	—	—
2001–02	Montreal Canadiens	NHL	34	3	5	8	62	12	0	1	1	16
2003–04	Montreal Canadiens	NHL	63	15	20	35	104	11	0	2	2	39
2004–05	Färjestads BK	SEL	39	9	8	17	117	15	1	6	7	77
2005–06	Montreal Canadiens	NHL	75	12	27	39	116	6	3	2	5	8
2006–07	Montreal Canadiens	NHL	81	26	38	64	135	—	—	—	—	—
2007–08	Edmonton Oilers	NHL	26	3	7	10	36	—	—	—	—	—
2008–09	Edmonton Oilers	NHL	81	23	30	53	98	—	—	—	—	—
2009–10	Edmonton Oilers	NHL	37	4	9	13	65	—	—	—	—	—
2010–11	Hershey Bears	AHL	40	4	15	19	85	6	1	1	2	16
2011–12	Dallas Stars	NHL	64	6	15	21	73	—	—	—	—	—
2012–13	Anaheim Ducks	NHL	44	7	10	17	52	6	0	1	1	4
NHL totals			758	109	191	300	1145	40	3	8	11	69

=== International ===
Year	Team	Event	Result	GP	G	A	Pts	PIM
2005	Canada	WC	2nd place, silver medalist(s)	9	1	1	2	6
Senior totals				9	1	1	2	6
