= Adrian Aucoin =

Canadian ice hockey player (born 1973)

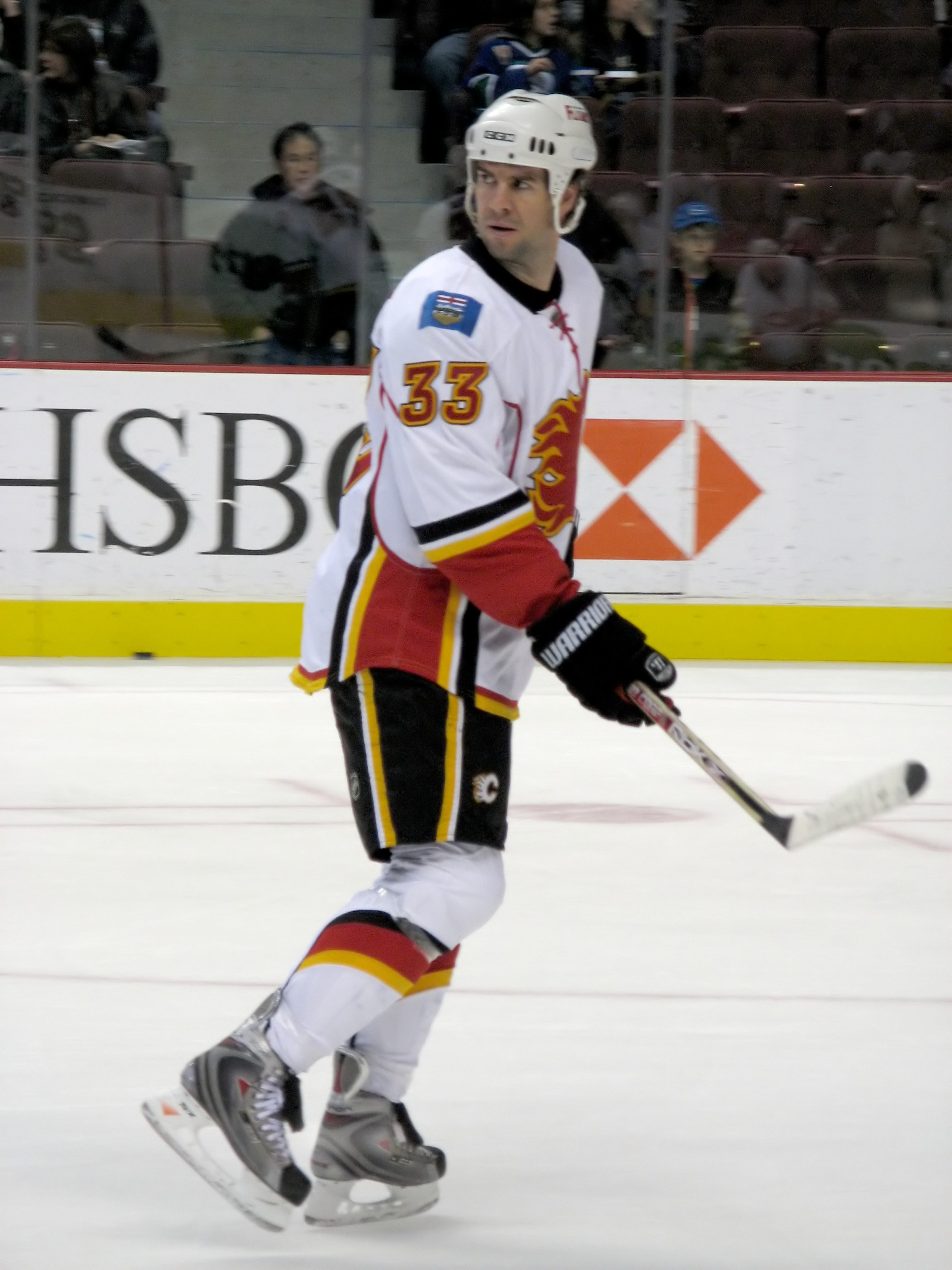
- Aucoin with the Calgary Flames in 2007
- Born: July 3, 1973 (age 53) Ottawa, Ontario, Canada
- Height: 6 ft 2 in (188 cm)
- Weight: 208 lb (94 kg; 14 st 12 lb)
- Position: Defence
- Shot: Right
- Played for: Vancouver Canucks; Tampa Bay Lightning; New York Islanders; Chicago Blackhawks; Calgary Flames; Phoenix Coyotes; Columbus Blue Jackets
- National team: Canada
- NHL draft: 117th overall, 1992; Vancouver Canucks
- Playing career: 1994–2013

Adrian Mark Aucoin (born July 3, 1973) is a Canadian former professional ice hockey defenceman. He played over 1,100 games in the National Hockey League (NHL). Aucoin was born in Ottawa, Ontario, but grew up in Gloucester, Ontario.

== Playing career ==
As a youth, Aucoin played in the 1987 Quebec International Pee-Wee Hockey Tournament with a minor ice hockey team from Gloucester.

Aucoin was drafted 117th overall by the Vancouver Canucks in the 1992 NHL entry draft, making his NHL debut in 1994–95, playing one game with Vancouver. With the Canucks, Aucoin established himself as a significant offensive threat, specifically on the power play. However, it was not until his fourth full season with the team that this became evident, as he rose from three goals in 1997–98 to 23 the next season, 18 of which came on the power-play, tying Denis Potvin for the NHL single-season record (broken by Sheldon Souray's 19 powerplay goals in 2006–07). In addition to leading all league defencemen in goals and power-play goals in the 1998–99 season, Aucoin also led all defencemen in shorthanded goals (2) and game-winning goals (3).

However, after one-and-a-half seasons, Aucoin's offensive production dropped to the point where he had only 3 goals through 47 games in 2000–01. On February 7, 2001, Aucoin (along with a second-round pick for the 2001 NHL entry draft) was traded to the Tampa Bay Lightning for goaltender Dan Cloutier. He only played 26 regular-season games for the Lightning before being traded in the off-season with Alexander Kharitonov to the New York Islanders in exchange for Mathieu Biron and a second-round pick in the 2002 NHL entry draft.

With the Islanders, Aucoin put up the most consistent offensive numbers of his career, including a career-high 33 assists and 44 points in 2003–04, resulting in him being chosen to play in the 2004 NHL All-Star Game for the Eastern Conference. He shared a victory in the hardest shot competition with Sheldon Souray of the Montreal Canadiens with a 102.2 mph blast and scored the first goal of the game in a 6–4 win over the Western Conference.

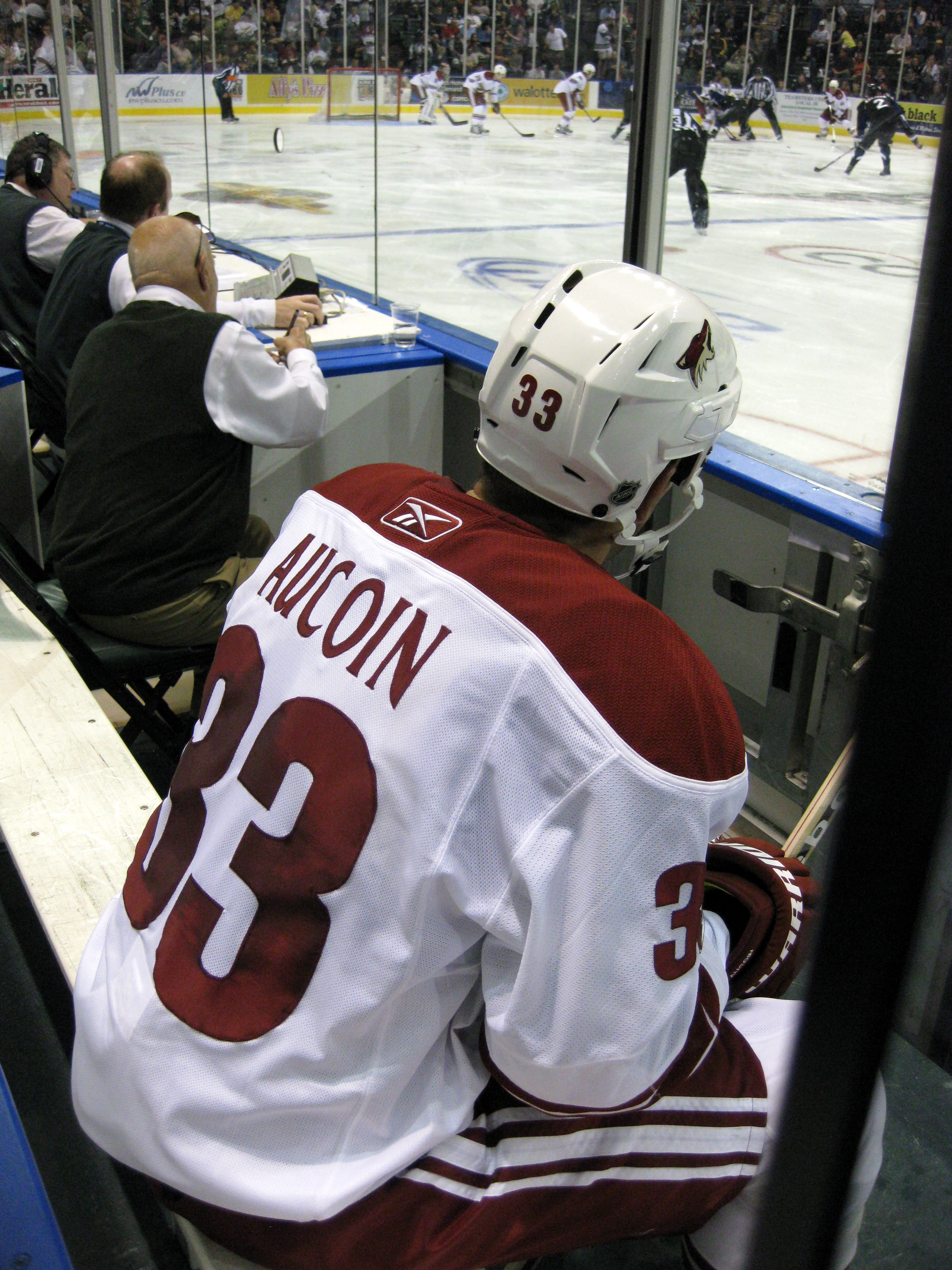
Aucoin with the Coyotes in the 2009-10 season.

In 2004–05, he played for Modo Hockey in the Swedish Elitserien during the NHL lockout. After NHL play resumed, on August 2, 2005, Aucoin signed a four-year contract with the Chicago Blackhawks, eventually being named team captain. However, the first two seasons of his contract were hampered by injuries, and in the off-season prior to the 2007–08 season, Aucoin waived his no-trade clause and was sent with a seventh-round draft pick to the Calgary Flames in exchange for defencemen Andrei Zyuzin and Steve Marr. In his first season with Calgary, Aucoin recorded the fifth 30-point season of his career in 2007–08 with 35 points, and recorded his sixth 30-point season in the 2008–09 season with 34 points.

In the summer of 2009, Aucoin, a free agent, signed a contract with the Phoenix Coyotes. He helped the Coyotes win the Pacific Division in 2012, where they advanced to the Western Conference finals. After three seasons with the Coyotes, Aucoin left as a free agent to sign a one-year contract with the Columbus Blue Jackets on July 1, 2012. During the lockout shortened 2012–13 season, Aucoin served as an alternate captain with the Blue Jackets. In 36 games, he totalled four assists, but added a needed veteran presence at the Blueline. In the summer of 2013, he became an unrestricted free agent. On November 19, 2013, Aucoin announced his retirement from professional hockey.

== International play ==
Olympic medal record

Representing Canada

Ice Hockey

Olympic Games
| Silver medal – second place | 1994 Lillehammer | |

World Junior Championships
| Gold medal – first place | 1993 Gävle | |

== Personal life ==
Aucoin's son Kyle was drafted in the sixth round, 156th overall, by the Detroit Red Wings in the 2020 NHL entry draft.

== Career statistics ==
=== Regular season and playoffs ===
| | | | Regular season | | | | | Playoffs |
| Season | Team | League | GP | G | A | Pts | PIM | GP | G | A | Pts | PIM |
|---|---|---|---|---|---|---|---|---|---|---|---|---|
| 1989–90 | Nepean Raiders | CJHL | 54 | 2 | 14 | 16 | 95 | 4 | 0 | 1 | 1 | — |
| 1990–91 | Nepean Raiders | CJHL | 56 | 17 | 33 | 50 | 125 | 17 | 8 | 17 | 25 | 14 |
| 1991–92 | Boston University | HE | 33 | 2 | 10 | 12 | 62 | — | — | — | — | — |
| 1992–93 | Canadian National Team | Intl | 42 | 8 | 10 | 18 | 71 | — | — | — | — | — |
| 1993–94 | Canadian National Team | Intl | 63 | 5 | 12 | 17 | 82 | — | — | — | — | — |
| 1993–94 | Hamilton Canucks | AHL | 13 | 1 | 2 | 3 | 19 | 4 | 0 | 2 | 2 | 6 |
| 1994–95 | Syracuse Crunch | AHL | 71 | 13 | 18 | 31 | 52 | — | — | — | — | — |
| 1994–95 | Vancouver Canucks | NHL | 1 | 1 | 0 | 1 | 0 | 4 | 1 | 0 | 1 | 0 |
| 1995–96 | Syracuse Crunch | AHL | 29 | 5 | 13 | 18 | 47 | — | — | — | — | — |
| 1995–96 | Vancouver Canucks | NHL | 49 | 4 | 14 | 18 | 34 | 6 | 0 | 0 | 0 | 2 |
| 1996–97 | Vancouver Canucks | NHL | 70 | 5 | 16 | 21 | 63 | — | — | — | — | — |
| 1997–98 | Vancouver Canucks | NHL | 35 | 3 | 3 | 6 | 21 | — | — | — | — | — |
| 1998–99 | Vancouver Canucks | NHL | 82 | 23 | 11 | 34 | 77 | — | — | — | — | — |
| 1999–00 | Vancouver Canucks | NHL | 57 | 10 | 14 | 24 | 30 | — | — | — | — | — |
| 2000–01 | Vancouver Canucks | NHL | 47 | 3 | 13 | 16 | 20 | — | — | — | — | — |
| 2000–01 | Tampa Bay Lightning | NHL | 26 | 1 | 11 | 12 | 25 | — | — | — | — | — |
| 2001–02 | New York Islanders | NHL | 81 | 12 | 22 | 34 | 62 | 7 | 2 | 5 | 7 | 4 |
| 2002–03 | New York Islanders | NHL | 73 | 8 | 27 | 35 | 70 | 5 | 1 | 2 | 3 | 4 |
| 2003–04 | New York Islanders | NHL | 81 | 13 | 31 | 44 | 54 | 5 | 0 | 0 | 0 | 6 |
| 2004–05 | Modo | SEL | 14 | 2 | 4 | 6 | 32 | 6 | 1 | 0 | 1 | 16 |
| 2005–06 | Chicago Blackhawks | NHL | 33 | 1 | 5 | 6 | 38 | — | — | — | — | — |
| 2006–07 | Chicago Blackhawks | NHL | 59 | 4 | 12 | 16 | 50 | — | — | — | — | — |
| 2007–08 | Calgary Flames | NHL | 76 | 10 | 25 | 35 | 37 | 7 | 0 | 3 | 3 | 4 |
| 2008–09 | Calgary Flames | NHL | 81 | 10 | 24 | 34 | 46 | 6 | 2 | 1 | 3 | 2 |
| 2009–10 | Phoenix Coyotes | NHL | 82 | 8 | 20 | 28 | 56 | 7 | 0 | 2 | 2 | 10 |
| 2010–11 | Phoenix Coyotes | NHL | 75 | 3 | 19 | 22 | 52 | 4 | 0 | 0 | 0 | 2 |
| 2011–12 | Phoenix Coyotes | NHL | 64 | 2 | 7 | 9 | 42 | 11 | 0 | 2 | 2 | 10 |
| 2012–13 | Columbus Blue Jackets | NHL | 36 | 0 | 4 | 4 | 16 | — | — | — | — | — |
| NHL totals | | | 1,108 | 121 | 278 | 399 | 793 | 62 | 6 | 15 | 21 | 44 |

=== International ===
| Year | Team | Event | Result | GP | G | A | Pts | PIM |
|---|---|---|---|---|---|---|---|---|
| 1993 | Canada | WJC | 1st place, gold medalist(s) | 7 | 0 | 1 | 1 | 8 |
| 1994 | Canada | OG | 2nd place, silver medalist(s) | 4 | 0 | 0 | 0 | 2 |
| 2000 | Canada | WC | 4th | 9 | 3 | 3 | 6 | 14 |
| Junior totals | | | | 7 | 0 | 1 | 1 | 8 |
| Senior totals | | | | 13 | 3 | 3 | 6 | 16 |

== Awards ==
- Bob Nystrom Award: 2004
- Babe Pratt Trophy (Vancouver Canucks' best defenceman): 1999
- Selected to one NHL All-Star Game: 2004

== Transactions ==
- June 20, 1992 – Drafted 117th overall in the 1992 NHL entry draft by the Vancouver Canucks
- February 7, 2001 – Traded to the Tampa Bay Lightning with a 2nd round draft pick (2001 NHL entry draft) for Dan Cloutier
- June 22, 2001 – Traded to the New York Islanders with Alexander Kharitonov for Mathieu Biron and a 2nd round draft pick (2002 NHL entry draft)
- August 2, 2005 – Signed a four-year deal with the Chicago Blackhawks
- July 1, 2009 – Signed with the Phoenix Coyotes
- July 1, 2012 – Signed with the Columbus Blue Jackets

== See also ==
- List of NHL players with 1,000 games played

| Preceded by Alexei Zhamnov | Chicago Blackhawks captain 2005–07; Martin Lapointe, 2006 | Succeeded by Jonathan Toews |
