= Emilio Fraietta =

Canadian gridiron football player (born 1955)

No. 37
- Positions: Defensive back, Kick returner, Punt returner

Personal information
- Born: October 13, 1955 (age 71); Italy
- Listed height: 5 ft 10 in (1.78 m)
- Listed weight: 175 lb (79 kg)

Career information
- High school: St. Joseph High School Edmonton (AB)
- CJFL: Edmonton Wildcats
- College: Siskiyous

Career history
- 1979–1983: Edmonton Eskimos

Awards and highlights
- 4× Grey Cup champion (1979, 1980, 1981, 1982)

Emilio Fraietta (born October 23, 1955) is an Italian former professional Canadian football defensive back who played five seasons with the Edmonton Eskimos of the Canadian Football League. He played college football at the College of the Siskiyous. He also played junior football for the Edmonton Wildcats of the Canadian Junior Football League.

== Early life ==
Fraietta was born in Italy on October 23, 1955. His family moved to Edmonton when he was 12 years old. He played high school football at Archbishop O'Leary Catholic High School in Edmonton, Alberta .

== Junior football ==
Fraietta played three years of junior football for the Edmonton Wildcats of the Canadian Junior Football League, winning a national title in 1977.

== College career ==
Fraietta played one year for the College of the Siskiyous Eagles after his junior football career.

== Professional career ==
Fraietta tried out three times for the Edmonton Eskimos before making the team in 1979. He played in 80 games for the team from 1979 to 1983, winning the Grey Cup four times.
