= Fernando Pisani =

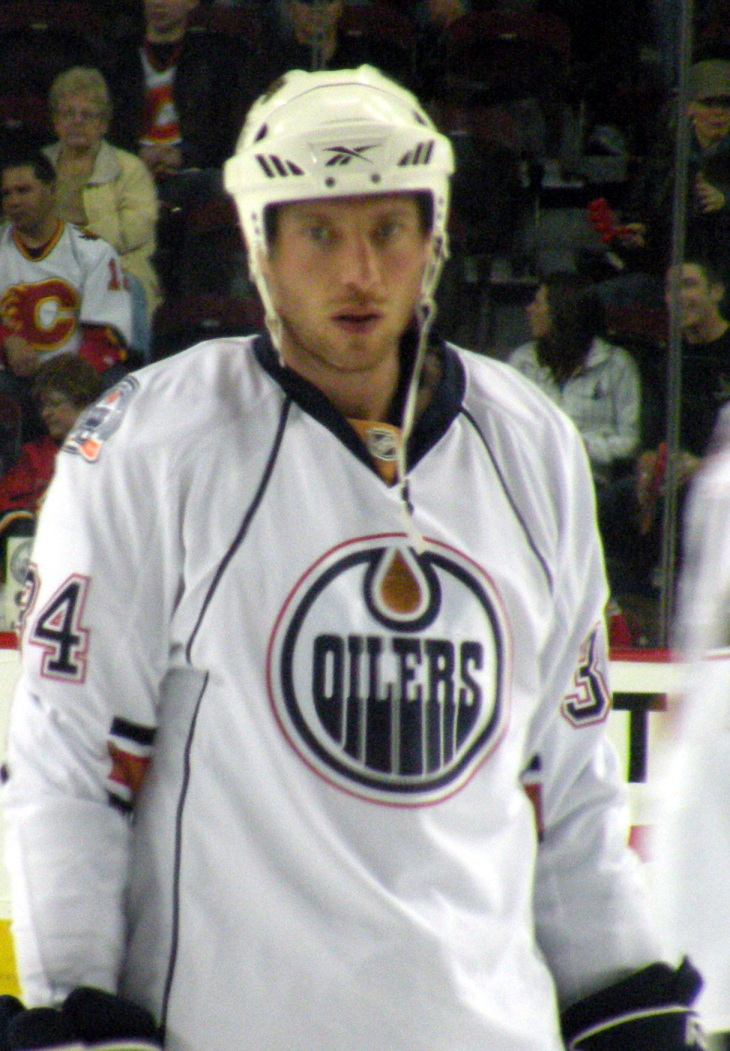
- Pisani with the Edmonton Oilers in April 2009
- Born: December 27, 1976 (age 49) Edmonton, Alberta, Canada
- Height: 6 ft 1 in (185 cm)
- Weight: 205 lb (93 kg; 14 st 9 lb)
- Position: Right wing
- Shot: Left
- Played for: Edmonton Oilers; Chicago Blackhawks; SCL Tigers; HC Asiago; Södertälje SK
- NHL draft: 195th overall, 1996; Edmonton Oilers
- Playing career: 2000–2011

Fernando Antonio Pisani (born December 27, 1976) is a Canadian former professional ice hockey right winger. He played professionally in the National Hockey League for his hometown Edmonton Oilers for seven NHL seasons, and one for the Chicago Blackhawks.

== Playing career ==
After posting 103 points in 58 games with the St. Albert Saints of the Alberta Junior Hockey League (AJHL), Pisani was drafted in the eighth round, 195th overall, by his hometown team, the Edmonton Oilers in the 1996 NHL entry draft. Upon being drafted, Pisani played four years of collegiate hockey for Providence College.

In 2000–01, the Oilers assigned him to their American Hockey League (AHL) affiliate, the Hamilton Bulldogs. Pisani spent two seasons in Hamilton, before being called up in his third AHL season in 2002–03. He scored his first NHL goal on February 5, 2003, in a 2-1 win against the Mighty Ducks of Anaheim. He finished the season with the Oilers, playing in 35 games with 13 points. Pisani is generally considered a "late bloomer", because he did not see his first NHL action until the age of 27.

Due to the 2004–05 NHL lockout, Pisani went overseas to Europe and played in the Swiss Nationalliga A and Italian Serie A with HC Asiago.

=== 2006 Stanley Cup Playoffs ===
As NHL play resumed in 2005–06, Pisani scored a career-high 18 goals, 19 assists and 37 points. Although the Oilers entered the playoffs as the eighth and final seed in the Western Conference, they embarked on a cinderella run to the 2006 Stanley Cup Final against the Carolina Hurricanes. Pisani became a playoff hero in the process, significantly elevating his game. Against the first-seeded Detroit Red Wings, Pisani scored two third period goals (his fourth and fifth of the series) in game six, series-clinching 4-2 victory. Advancing to the second round against the San Jose Sharks, Pisani recorded another two-goal effort, including the game winner, in a 6-3 game five win. Reaching the finals against Carolina, the Oilers faced elimination in the fifth game. Going into overtime on the penalty kill, Pisani intercepted a pass and scored his second goal of the game on a breakaway to stave off elimination. It was the first time in Stanley Cup Final history that an overtime game was decided by a shorthanded goal. Pisani then scored the Oilers' only goal in a game seven loss. He just missed tying the game with three minutes left in regulation time when his shot, on the rebound from the initial shot by Raffi Torres, was saved by Carolina goalie Cam Ward.

Pisani finished the playoffs with a league-leading 14 goals including 5 game-winners, nearly matching his regular season output of 18 goals in 80 games. He was re-signed by the Oilers in the off-season to a four-year, $10 million contract on July 1, 2006.

=== Ulcerative Colitis ===
Pisani followed his 2006 playoff performance with a 28-point season in 2006–07, but the Oilers failed to qualify for the post-season. Prior to the start of the 2007–08 season, he was diagnosed with ulcerative colitis, sidelining him for the first 26 games of the campaign. He returned to the Oilers lineup on December 2, 2007, and was nominated that year for the Bill Masterton Trophy, an award given for perseverance and dedication to hockey. The award was subsequently given to Jason Blake of the Toronto Maple Leafs who had been diagnosed with chronic myelogenous leukemia at the start of the season, but still managed to play in all 82 games.

=== Final NHL years ===
On November 17, 2008, in a 4–0 loss to the Detroit Red Wings, Pisani suffered an ankle fracture as he lost his footing and sliding into the boards, resulting in him missing the next 44 games. This injury shortened 2008–09 season saw Pisani suit up for only 38 games, scoring seven goals to go with eight assists for 15 total points.

Pisiani would miss the first 13 games of the 2009–10 season due to a strained back. Pisani ended the season with four goals and assists for eight points in 40 games as the Oilers missed the playoffs for the fourth straight season and finished last in the entire NHL.

After becoming an unrestricted free agent, Pisani signed a one-year deal with the reigning Stanley Cup champions, the Chicago Blackhawks, for the 2010–11 season. On February 11, 2011, in a 4–3 shootout loss to the Dallas Stars, Pisani was leveled by Stars' defenseman Mark Fistric, resulting in a concussion for Pisani and a 12 game absence. He appeared in 60 games and registered 16 points (seven goals and nine assists) as the defending Stanley Cup champion Blackhawks barely got into the playoffs as the eighth and final seed in the West. In the first round of the 2011 playoffs, that saw the Blackhawks fall in seven games to the Presidents' Trophy-winning Vancouver Canucks, Pisani was held pointless in three games.

On January 1, 2012, the Swedish team Södertälje SK of the HockeyAllsvenskan announced that Pisani would join the team. However, on January 10, Pisani revoked the contract, stating that he did not think he was at a level where he could contribute effectively.

== Personal life ==
He attended St. Cecilia Junior High School and Archbishop O'Leary Catholic High School with Sheldon Souray. He and his wife Heidi have two sons and a daughter.

== Records ==
- First player to score a shorthanded overtime goal in Stanley Cup Final history - June 14, 2006

== Career statistics ==
Bold indicates led league

			Regular season					Playoffs
Season	Team	League	GP	G	A	Pts	PIM	GP	G	A	Pts	PIM
1993–94	St. Albert Saints	AJHL	50	6	21	27	24	11	3	6	9	14
1994–95	Bonnyville Pontiacs	AJHL	16	4	34	38	97	—	—	—	—	—
1994–95	St. Albert Saints	AJHL	40	26	21	47	16	5	4	1	5	4
1995–96	St. Albert Saints	AJHL	58	40	63	103	134	18	7	22	29	28
1996–97	Providence College	HE	35	12	18	30	36	—	—	—	—	—
1997–98	Providence College	HE	36	16	18	34	20	—	—	—	—	—
1998–99	Providence College	HE	38	14	37	51	42	—	—	—	—	—
1999–2000	Providence College	HE	38	14	24	38	56	—	—	—	—	—
2000–01	Hamilton Bulldogs	AHL	52	12	13	25	28	—	—	—	—	—
2001–02	Hamilton Bulldogs	AHL	79	26	34	60	60	15	4	6	10	4
2002–03	Hamilton Bulldogs	AHL	41	17	15	32	24	—	—	—	—	—
2002–03	Edmonton Oilers	NHL	35	8	5	13	10	6	1	0	1	2
2003–04	Edmonton Oilers	NHL	76	16	14	30	46	—	—	—	—	—
2004–05	SCL Tigers	NLA	7	1	3	4	0	—	—	—	—	—
2004–05	Asiago Hockey A.S.	ITA	12	1	5	6	6	9	4	6	10	0
2005–06	Edmonton Oilers	NHL	80	18	19	37	42	24	**14**	4	18	10
2006–07	Edmonton Oilers	NHL	77	14	14	28	40	—	—	—	—	—
2007–08	Edmonton Oilers	NHL	56	13	9	22	28	—	—	—	—	—
2008–09	Edmonton Oilers	NHL	38	7	8	15	14	—	—	—	—	—
2009–10	Edmonton Oilers	NHL	40	4	4	8	10	—	—	—	—	—
2010–11	Chicago Blackhawks	NHL	60	7	9	16	10	3	0	0	0	0
2011–12	Södertälje SK	SWE.2	3	0	1	1	4	—	—	—	—	—
AHL totals			172	55	62	117	112	15	4	6	10	4
NHL totals			482	87	82	169	200	33	15	4	19	12

== See also ==
- List of people diagnosed with ulcerative colitis
