= Archbishop O'Leary Catholic High School =

10-12 school in Edmonton, Alberta (est. 1960)

Coordinates: 53°35′34″N 113°28′31″W

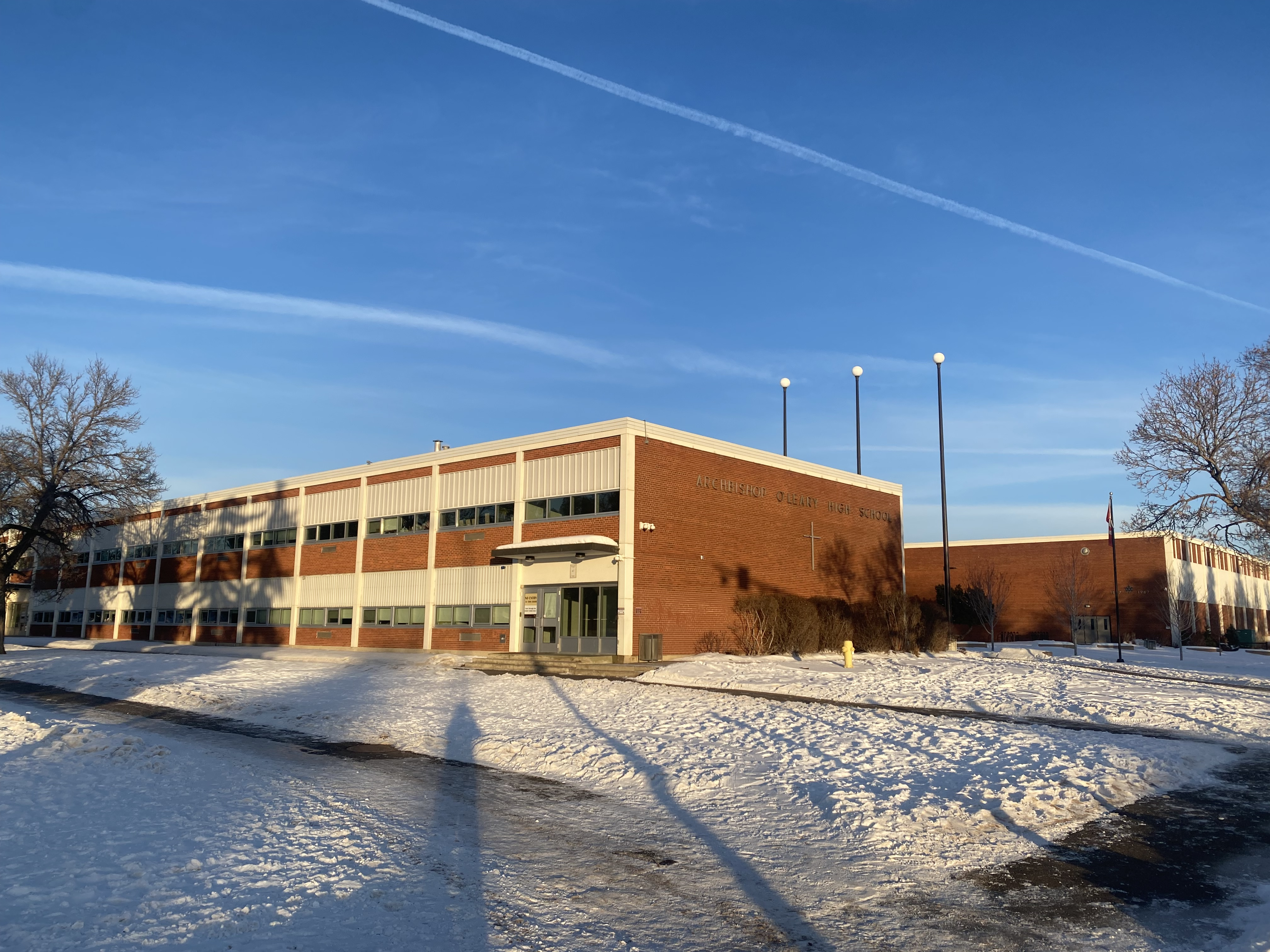
- Exterior of Archbishop O'Leary

Location
- 8760 - 132 Avenue; Edmonton, Alberta, T5E 0X8; Canada

Information
- School type: Secondary school
- Motto: "Viam Veritatis Elegi" ("We Will Seek the Truth")
- Founded: 1960
- School board: Edmonton Catholic School District
- Superintendent: Lynette Anderson
- Principal: Nicole Falcone-Dempsey
- AP Coordinator: Bryan Clintberg
- Grades: 10–12
- Enrolment: ~2,000
- Language: English, French, Spanish & Italian
- Colours: Red and gold
- Team name: Spartans
- Website: www.archbishopoleary.ecsd.net

Archbishop O'Leary Catholic High School is a high school located in north Edmonton. They offer Advanced Placement courses. The high school enrollment is fairly large with a student body of about 2,000 students.

== History ==
Archbishop O'Leary opened in 1960 when Edmonton had a population of nearly 270,000. The school underwent a major, multi-million-dollar modernization renovation which began in 2014, with completion by late 2019. The modernization of the school included significant enhancements to classrooms and facilities, along with the addition of “The Hub” - which was transformed from a courtyard into a large cafeteria and a student gathering space. The school is known for its outstanding programming, a positive sense of community and has one of the best high school completion rates out of any high school. Additionally it was recognized by Alberta Education for its accomplishments in this area.

== Athletics ==
The O'Leary Spartans compete under the governance of the Alberta Schools Athletic Association (ASAA) and the Edmonton Metro Athletic Association (EMAA). The school offers athletic programs in a variety of sports, including Badminton, Basketball, Cross Country, Football, Rugby 15's (for both men and women), Rugby 7's (men), Soccer, Swimming, Track and Field, Volleyball, Wrestling, and Karate.

There exists a Student Union at O'Leary responsible for hosting student events and more. Clubs at O'Leary include: Art, Spectrum (GSA), Model UN, Comic Club, Dungeons and Dragons, and others.

== Academics ==
Archbishop O'Leary offers a variety of academic and specialized programs. These include Advanced Placement (AP) courses, as well as programs in Computer Science, Mechanics, Construction, and Sports Medicine. The school also provides opportunities in the arts through Dance and the Drama and Drama Production Academy. Additionally, there are programs in Finance, Legal Studies, and a Soccer Academy. The Braided Journeys Program is designed to support First Nations, Métis, and Inuit students, families, and the broader community.

== Notable alumni ==
- Chris Benoit (1967-2007) - professional wrestler.
- Emilio Fraietta (born 1955)- Canadian professional football player
- Matt Frattin (born 1988) - professional hockey player
- Grace Mahary (born 1989) - fashion model
- Ross Ongaro (born 1959) - professional soccer player and coach; FIFA instructor
- Fernando Pisani (born 1976) - professional hockey player
- Joe Poplawski (born 1957) - Canadian professional football player
- Rick Walters (born 1971) - Canadian professional football player

== See also ==
- Edmonton Catholic School District
- Schools in Alberta
