= 2006–07 Philadelphia Flyers season =

NHL hockey team season

2006–07 Philadelphia Flyers
- Division: 5th Atlantic
- Conference: 15th Eastern
- 2006–07 record: 22–48–12
- Home record: 10–24–7
- Road record: 12–24–5
- Goals for: 214
- Goals against: 303

Team information
- General manager: Bob Clarke (Oct.); Paul Holmgren (Oct.–Apr.)
- Coach: Ken Hitchcock (Oct.); John Stevens (Oct.–Apr.)
- Captain: Peter Forsberg (Oct.–Feb.); Vacant (Feb.–Apr.)
- Alternate captains: Simon Gagne; Derian Hatcher; Sami Kapanen (Feb.–Apr.)
- Arena: Wachovia Center
- Average attendance: 19,283
- Minor league affiliates: Philadelphia Phantoms; Trenton Titans

Team leaders
- Goals: Simon Gagne (41)
- Assists: Joni Pitkanen (39)
- Points: Simon Gagne (68)
- Penalty minutes: Ben Eager (233)
- Plus/minus: Scottie Upshall (+4)
- Wins: Antero Niittymaki (9)
- Goals against average: Martin Biron (3.01)

The 2006–07 Philadelphia Flyers season was the franchise's 40th season in the National Hockey League (NHL). For the first time in franchise history the Flyers finished with the worst record in the entire league and missed the playoffs for the first time since 1993–94.

== Off-season ==
During the off-season the Flyers lost Michal Handzus in a trade with the Chicago Blackhawks, defenseman Kim Johnsson to free agency and Eric Desjardins and team captain Keith Primeau to retirement.

On September 12, 2006, the Flyers signed restricted free agent Ryan Kesler of the Vancouver Canucks to an offer sheet. The Canucks matched the 1-year, $1.9 million deal.

== Regular season ==
Peter Forsberg replaced Primeau as team captain, but a chronic foot injury had him in and out of the lineup throughout the season and limited his effectiveness. Eight games into the regular season and with a record of 1–6–1, general manager Bob Clarke resigned and head coach Ken Hitchcock was fired. Assistant coach John Stevens replaced Hitchcock and assistant general manager Paul Holmgren took on Clarke's responsibilities on an interim basis.

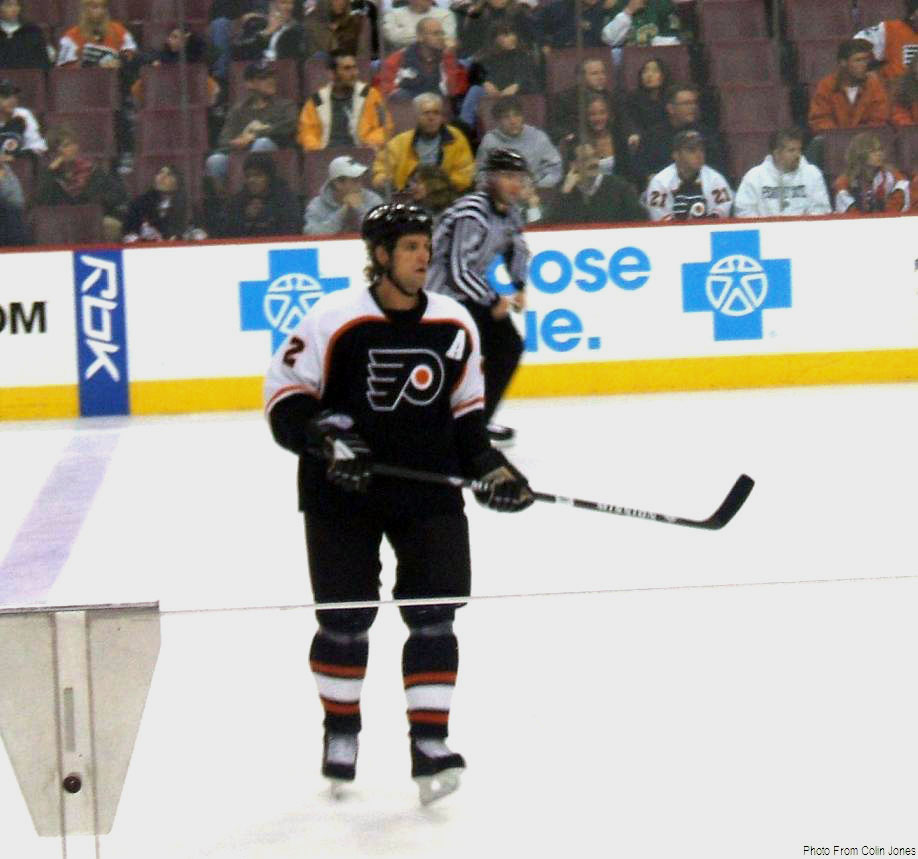
Alternate captain Derian Hatcher was the lone Flyer to play all 82 games and was named the league’s top penalty killer by The Hockey News.

The changes did little to improve the Flyers fortunes in 2006–07 as setting franchise records for futility became the norm. They had several multiple-game losing streaks including a franchise worst 10–game losing streak and a 12–game home losing streak that stretched from November 29 to February 10. Ultimately, the Flyers finished with a 22–48–12 record, the most losses in franchise history and the worst record in the league. They also set the NHL record for the biggest points drop off in the standings in a one-year span (101 points in 2005–06 to 56 points in 2006–07, a difference of 45 points).

With the team clearly on the verge of missing the playoffs for the first time since 1994, Holmgren set his sights on rebuilding the team and preparing for the future. Forsberg, unwilling to commit to playing next season, was traded to the Nashville Predators for Scottie Upshall, Ryan Parent, and 2007 1st and 3rd-round draft picks. Veteran defenseman Alexei Zhitnik was traded to the Atlanta Thrashers for prospect defenseman Braydon Coburn and disappointing off-season acquisition Kyle Calder was sent to the Detroit Red Wings via Chicago in exchange for defenseman Lasse Kukkonen. The Flyers also acquired goaltender Martin Biron from the Buffalo Sabres for a 2007 2nd-round pick. Given wide praise for his efforts, the Flyers gave Holmgren a two-year contract and removed the interim label from his title.

The Flyers finished the regular season having allowed 297 goals (excluding 6 shootout goals allowed), the most in the league.

=== Season standings ===
Atlantic Division
No.	CR		GP	W	L	OTL	GF	GA	Pts
1	2	**New Jersey Devils**	82	49	24	9	216	201	107
2	5	**Pittsburgh Penguins**	82	47	24	11	277	246	105
3	6	**New York Rangers**	82	42	30	10	242	216	94
4	8	**New York Islanders**	82	40	30	12	248	240	92
5	15	Philadelphia Flyers	82	22	48	12	214	303	56

Note: No. = Division rank, CR = Conference rank, W = Wins, L = Losses, T = Ties, GF = Goals For, GA = Goals Against, Pts = Points
Teams that qualified for the playoffs are highlighted in bold.

Eastern Conference
R		Div	GP	W	L	OTL	GF	GA	Pts
**1**	**P -** Buffalo Sabres	**NE**	**82**	**53**	**22**	**7**	**308**	**242**	113
**2**	**Y -** New Jersey Devils	**AT**	**82**	**49**	**24**	**9**	**216**	**201**	107
**3**	**Y -** Atlanta Thrashers	**SE**	**82**	**43**	**28**	**11**	**246**	**245**	97
**4**	**X -** Ottawa Senators	**NE**	**82**	**48**	**25**	**9**	**288**	**222**	105
**5**	**X -** Pittsburgh Penguins	**AT**	**82**	**47**	**24**	**11**	**277**	**246**	105
**6**	**X -** New York Rangers	**AT**	**82**	**42**	**30**	**10**	**242**	**216**	94
**7**	**X -** Tampa Bay Lightning	**SE**	**82**	**44**	**33**	**5**	**253**	**261**	93
**8**	**X -** New York Islanders	**AT**	**82**	**40**	**30**	**12**	**248**	**240**	92
8.5
9	Toronto Maple Leafs	NE	82	40	31	11	258	269	91
10	Montreal Canadiens	NE	82	42	34	6	245	256	90
11	Carolina Hurricanes	SE	82	40	34	8	241	253	88
12	Florida Panthers	SE	82	35	31	16	247	257	86
13	Boston Bruins	NE	82	35	41	6	219	289	76
14	Washington Capitals	SE	82	28	40	14	235	286	70
15	Philadelphia Flyers	AT	82	22	48	12	214	303	56

Divisions: AT – Atlantic, NE – Northeast, SE – Southeast

P – Clinched Presidents Trophy; Y – Clinched division; X – Clinched playoff spot

== Schedule and results ==
=== Preseason ===
2006 preseason
Preseason: 1–5–1 (home: 1–2–0; road: 0–3–1)

Game	Date	Score	Opponent	Decision	Record	Recap
1^{[a]}	September 20	4–5	@ Pittsburgh Penguins	Houle	0–1–0	L
2	September 21	2–1	New Jersey Devils	Niittymaki	1–1–0	W
3	September 23	3–4	Ottawa Senators	Esche	1–2–0	L
4^{[b]}	September 24	1–2	@ Pittsburgh Penguins	Houle	1–3–0	L
5	September 26	1–6	Washington Capitals	Esche	1–4–0	L
6	September 28	4–5 SO	@ New Jersey Devils	Esche	1–4–1	OTL
7	September 29	0–1	@ Washington Capitals	Esche	1–5–1	L
Notes:^{a} Game played at Moncton Coliseum in Moncton, New Brunswick.^{b} Game played at John Labatt Centre in London, Ontario.

Legend: W Win (2 points) L Loss (0 points) OTL Overtime/shootout loss (1 point)

=== Regular season ===
2006–07 regular season
October: 3–7–1 (home: 2–2–1; road: 1–5–0)

Game	Date	Score	Opponent	Decision	Attendance	Record	Points	Recap
1	October 5	0–4	@ Pittsburgh Penguins	Esche	16,957	0–1–0	0	L
2	October 7	4–5 SO	New York Rangers	Niittymaki	19,798	0–1–1	1	OTL
3	October 10	4–2	@ New York Rangers	Niittymaki	18,200	1–1–1	3	W
4	October 11	1–3	Montreal Canadiens	Niittymaki	19,256	1–2–1	3	L
5	October 14	2–3	@ New Jersey Devils	Niittymaki	14,177	1–3–1	3	L
6	October 17	1–9	@ Buffalo Sabres	Esche	18,690	1–4–1	3	L
7	October 19	1–4	@ Tampa Bay Lightning	Niittymaki	19,920	1–5–1	3	L
8	October 20	2–3	@ Florida Panthers	Niittymaki	17,194	1–6–1	3	L
9	October 26	3–2 SO	Atlanta Thrashers	Niittymaki	19,228	2–6–1	5	W
10	October 28	2–8	Pittsburgh Penguins	Niittymaki	19,589	2–7–1	5	L
11	October 30	3–0	Chicago Blackhawks	Esche	18,876	3–7–1	7	W

November: 5–8–2 (home: 1–5–2; road: 4–3–0)

Game	Date	Score	Opponent	Decision	Attendance	Record	Points	Recap
12	November 2	2–5	Tampa Bay Lightning	Niittymaki	18,633	3–8–1	7	L
13	November 4	3–5	Washington Capitals	Esche	19,564	3–9–1	7	L
14	November 6	1–4	@ Toronto Maple Leafs	Niittymaki	19,501	3–10–1	7	L
15	November 9	1–3	New York Islanders	Niittymaki	18,656	3–11–1	7	L
16	November 11	4–5 OT	Buffalo Sabres	Niittymaki	19,633	3–11–2	8	OTL
17	November 13	2–3	@ Pittsburgh Penguins	Niittymaki	13,781	3–12–2	8	L
18	November 15	7–4	@ Anaheim Ducks	Esche	15,379	4–12–2	10	W
19	November 16	4–3	@ Los Angeles Kings	Niittymaki	16,446	5–12–2	12	W
20	November 18	1–6	@ San Jose Sharks	Esche	17,496	5–13–2	12	L
21	November 20	3–5	Pittsburgh Penguins	Niittymaki	19,349	5–14–2	12	L
22	November 22	2–3 OT	Ottawa Senators	Niittymaki	18,990	5–14–3	13	OTL
23	November 24	3–2	Columbus Blue Jackets	Niittymaki	19,301	6–14–3	15	W
24	November 25	4–2	@ Montreal Canadiens	Niittymaki	21,273	7–14–3	17	W
25	November 29	2–3	Nashville Predators	Niittymaki	18,789	7–15–3	17	L
26	November 30	3–2	@ New York Islanders	Niittymaki	10,280	8–15–3	19	W

December: 2–9–1 (home: 0–4–1; road: 2–5–0)

Game	Date	Score	Opponent	Decision	Attendance	Record	Points	Recap
27	December 2	3–4 SO	New Jersey Devils	Niittymaki	19,559	8–15–4	20	OTL
28	December 8	0–2	@ New Jersey Devils	Niittymaki	14,003	8–16–4	20	L
29	December 9	3–5	Washington Capitals	Niittymaki	19,211	8–17–4	20	L
30	December 12	1–3	New York Rangers	Niittymaki	19,389	8–18–4	20	L
31	December 13	4–8	@ Pittsburgh Penguins	Niittymaki	14,150	8–19–4	20	L
32	December 16	1–4	@ Washington Capitals	Niittymaki	15,021	8–20–4	20	L
33	December 19	1–2	Carolina Hurricanes	Niittymaki	19,111	8–21–4	20	L
34	December 21	2–4	@ Montreal Canadiens	Niittymaki	21,273	8–22–4	20	L
35	December 23	3–6	Ottawa Senators	Niittymaki	19,268	8–23–4	20	L
36	December 27	1–3	@ Florida Panthers	Niittymaki	17,771	8–24–4	20	L
37	December 28	4–3	@ Tampa Bay Lightning	Esche	21,171	9–24–4	22	W
38	December 31	5–2	@ Carolina Hurricanes	Esche	18,796	10–24–4	24	W

January: 2–8–2 (home: 0–4–1; road: 2–4–1)

Game	Date	Score	Opponent	Decision	Attendance	Record	Points	Recap
39	January 2	3–2	@ New York Islanders	Esche	10,461	11–24–4	26	W
40	January 4	2–3	@ New York Rangers	Esche	18,200	11–25–4	26	L
41	January 6	3–4	@ Boston Bruins	Esche	17,565	11–26–4	26	L
42	January 7	1–6	@ Ottawa Senators	Niittymaki	18,509	11–27–4	26	L
43	January 9	2–6	@ Washington Capitals	Esche	13,143	11–28–4	26	L
44	January 11	2–4	Montreal Canadiens	Niittymaki	19,411	11–29–4	26	L
45	January 13	3–5	Pittsburgh Penguins	Niittymaki	19,587	11–30–4	26	L
46	January 18	2–4	New York Islanders	Niittymaki	19,118	11–31–4	26	L
47	January 20	3–4 SO	@ New Jersey Devils	Niittymaki	16,621	11–31–5	27	OTL
48	January 27	1–2	New York Rangers	Esche	19,618	11–32–5	27	L
49	January 28	2–1	@ Atlanta Thrashers	Niittymaki	18,598	12–32–5	29	W
50	January 30	3–4 SO	Tampa Bay Lightning	Esche	19,313	12–32–6	30	OTL

February: 4–5–4 (home: 2–3–2; road: 2–2–2)

Game	Date	Score	Opponent	Decision	Attendance	Record	Points	Recap
51	February 1	5–6 OT	New Jersey Devils	Niittymaki	19,427	12–32–7	31	OTL
52	February 3	5–2	@ Atlanta Thrashers	Niittymaki	18,622	13–32–7	33	W
53	February 7	0–2	@ New York Islanders	Niittymaki	10,229	13–33–7	33	L
54	February 8	4–5 SO	Pittsburgh Penguins	Niittymaki	19,512	13–33–8	34	OTL
55	February 10	4–3 OT	St. Louis Blues	Leighton	19,215	14–33–8	36	W
56	February 12	6–1	Detroit Red Wings	Leighton	19,575	15–33–8	38	W
57	February 15	2–4	Toronto Maple Leafs	Leighton	19,321	15–34–8	38	L
58	February 17	5–3	@ New York Rangers	Niittymaki	18,200	16–34–8	40	W
59	February 19	3–6	Boston Bruins	Niittymaki	19,209	16–35–8	40	L
60	February 20	3–6	@ Buffalo Sabres	Esche	18,690	16–36–8	40	L
61	February 22	2–3 OT	@ Carolina Hurricanes	Niittymaki	14,533	16–36–9	41	OTL
62	February 24	2–5	Toronto Maple Leafs	Leighton	19,277	16–37–9	41	L
63	February 27	5–6 OT	@ New York Islanders	Niittymaki	11,443	16–37–10	42	OTL

March: 5–9–1 (home: 4–4–0; road: 1–5–1)

Game	Date	Score	Opponent	Decision	Attendance	Record	Points	Recap
64	March 1	4–3 OT	@ Boston Bruins	Biron	12,294	17–37–10	44	W
65	March 4	3–4 SO	@ Pittsburgh Penguins	Biron	17,132	17–37–11	45	OTL
66	March 6	5–4 OT	New Jersey Devils	Biron	19,210	18–37–11	47	W
67	March 8	1–2	Florida Panthers	Biron	19,489	18–38–11	47	L
68	March 10	4–1	Boston Bruins	Biron	19,550	19–38–11	49	W
69	March 12	0–4	@ Phoenix Coyotes	Biron	14,799	19–39–11	49	L
70	March 13	2–3	@ Dallas Stars	Niittymaki	17,618	19–40–11	49	L
71	March 15	3–2	Atlanta Thrashers	Biron	19,122	20–40–11	51	W
72	March 17	2–3	@ Ottawa Senators	Biron	19,639	20–41–11	51	L
73	March 20	1–4	Florida Panthers	Biron	18,721	20–42–11	51	L
74	March 21	0–5	@ New York Rangers	Niittymaki	18,200	20–43–11	51	L
75	March 24	3–4	New York Islanders	Biron	19,422	20–44–11	51	L
76	March 28	5–1	Carolina Hurricanes	Biron	19,123	21–44–11	53	W
77	March 30	1–3	@ New Jersey Devils	Biron	17,493	21–45–11	53	L
78	March 31	4–6	New York Rangers	Biron	19,555	21–46–11	53	L

April: 1–2–1 (home: 1–2–0; road: 0–0–1)

Game	Date	Score	Opponent	Decision	Attendance	Record	Points	Recap
79	April 3	2–3 OT	@ Toronto Maple Leafs	Biron	19,547	21–46–12	54	OTL
80	April 5	2–3	New Jersey Devils	Biron	19,177	21–47–12	54	L
81	April 7	2–4	New York Islanders	Niittymaki	19,412	21–48–12	54	L
82	April 8	4–3	Buffalo Sabres	Biron	19,550	22–48–12	56	W

Legend: W Win (2 points) L Loss (0 points) OTL Overtime/shootout loss (1 point)

== Player statistics ==
=== Scoring ===
- Position abbreviations: C = Center; D = Defense; G = Goaltender; LW = Left wing; RW = Right wing
- † = Joined team via a transaction (e.g., trade, waivers, signing) during the season. Stats reflect time with the Flyers only.
- ‡ = Left team via a transaction (e.g., trade, waivers, release) during the season. Stats reflect time with the Flyers only.

No.	Player	Pos	Regular season					
No.	Player	Pos	GP	G	A	Pts	+/-	PIM
12	Simon Gagne	LW	76	41	27	68	2	30
22	Mike Knuble	RW	64	24	30	54	2	56
44	Joni Pitkanen	D	77	4	39	43	−25	88
21	Peter Forsberg‡	C	40	11	29	40	2	72
17	Jeff Carter	C	62	14	23	37	−17	48
18	Mike Richards	C	59	10	22	32	−12	52
8	Geoff Sanderson	LW	58	11	18	29	−16	44
20	R. J. Umberger	C	81	16	12	28	−32	41
24	Sami Kapanen	RW	77	11	14	25	−21	22
6	Randy Jones	D	66	4	18	22	−14	38
45 (Note: Picard originally wore number 29 until Fedoruk was re-acquired.)	Alexandre Picard	D	62	3	19	22	−19	17
19	Kyle Calder‡	LW	59	9	12	21	−31	36
27	Randy Robitaille‡	C	28	5	12	17	−4	22
27	Dmitry Afanasenkov†	LW	41	8	7	15	−19	12
9	Scottie Upshall†	RW	18	6	7	13	4	8
15 (Note: Ruzicka originally wore number 9 until Upshall was acquired.)	Stefan Ruzicka	RW	40	3	10	13	−6	18
77	Alexei Zhitnik†‡	D	31	3	10	13	−16	38
11	Ryan Potulny	C	35	7	5	12	1	22
55	Ben Eager	LW	63	6	5	11	−13	233
29	Todd Fedoruk†	LW	48	3	8	11	−11	84
2	Derian Hatcher	D	82	3	6	9	−24	67
61	Mike York†	LW	34	4	4	8	−9	8
5	Braydon Coburn†	D	20	3	4	7	−2	16
93	Petr Nedved‡	C	21	1	6	7	−20	18
34	Freddy Meyer‡	D	25	2	3	5	−4	14
23	Denis Gauthier	D	43	0	4	4	−11	45
46	Jussi Timonen	D	14	0	4	4	−10	6
40	Eric Meloche	RW	13	1	2	3	−6	4
42	Robert Esche	G	18	0	3	3		2
65	Nate Guenin	D	9	0	2	2	0	4
43	Lars Jonsson	D	8	0	2	2	−4	6
28	Boyd Kane	LW	15	0	2	2	−4	28
5	Nolan Baumgartner‡	D	6	0	1	1	0	21
52	Triston Grant	LW	8	0	1	1	−1	10
3	Mike Rathje	D	18	0	1	1	−7	6
43	Martin Biron†	G	16	0	0	0		0
33	Riley Cote	LW	8	0	0	0	0	11
14	Mark Cullen	C	3	0	0	0	−3	0
15	Niko Dimitrakos	RW	5	0	0	0	−4	6
36	Matt Ellison	RW	2	0	0	0	0	0
32	Martin Grenier	D	3	0	0	0	−3	0
14	Denis Hamel†	LW	7	0	0	0	−4	0
35	Martin Houle	G	1	0	0	0		0
28	Lasse Kukkonen†	D	20	0	0	0	−1	8
49	Michael Leighton†‡	G	4	0	0	0		0
30	Antero Niittymaki	G	52	0	0	0		2
77	Ryan Parent†	D	1	0	0	0	0	0
54	David Printz	D	12	0	0	0	−3	4
26	Darren Reid†	RW	14	0	0	0	−7	18

=== Goaltending ===
- † = Joined team via a transaction (e.g., trade, waivers, signing) during the season. Stats reflect time with the Flyers only.
- ‡ = Left team via a transaction (e.g., trade, waivers, release) during the season. Stats reflect time with the Flyers only.

No.	Player	Regular season										
No.	Player	GP	GS	W	L	OT	SA	GA	GAA	SV%	SO	TOI
30	Antero Niittymaki	52	46	9	29	9	1567	166	3.38	.894	0	2,943
43	Martin Biron†	16	16	6	8	2	509	47	3.01	.908	0	935
42	Robert Esche	18	16	5	9	1	483	62	4.32	.872	1	860
49	Michael Leighton†‡	4	4	2	2	0	102	12	3.70	.882	0	195
35	Martin Houle	1	0	0	0	0	3	1	27.27	.667	0	2

== Awards and records ==
=== Awards ===
Type	Award/honor	Recipient	Ref
League (in-season)	NHL All-Star Game selection	Simon Gagne	
Team	Barry Ashbee Trophy	Derian Hatcher	
Team	Bobby Clarke Trophy	Simon Gagne	
Team	Gene Hart Memorial Award	Sami Kapanen	
Team	Pelle Lindbergh Memorial Trophy	Ben Eager	
Team	Toyota Cup	Simon Gagne	
Team	Yanick Dupre Memorial Class Guy Award	Mike Knuble	

=== Records ===
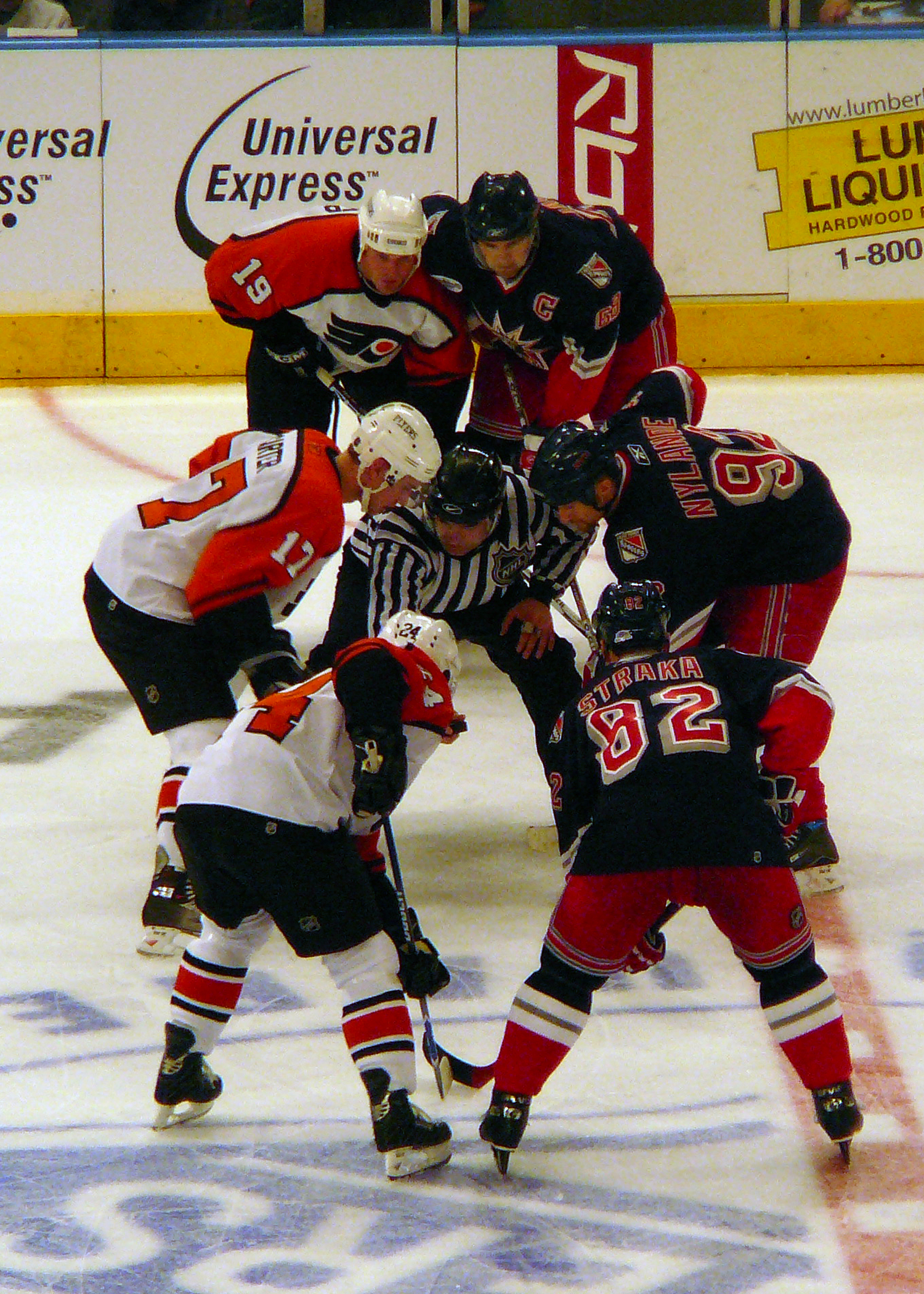
The 2006–07 edition of the Philadelphia Flyers (Kyle Calder, Jeff Carter, and Sami Kapanen pictured on the left during a January 4 game against the New York Rangers) holds several dubious franchise records.

Among the team records set during the 2006–07 season was a number of losing and winless streaks, including a nine-game losing streak (December 8 to December 27), an eight-game home losing streak (December 9 to January 27), and a 13-game home winless streak (November 29 to February 8). Goaltender Antero Niittymaki went a team record 15 games winless from December 2 to January 20. A lone bright spot was Alexandre Picard’s five assists on February 1 against the New Jersey Devils, setting team records for most assists in a single game by a defenseman and by a rookie.

Franchise single season records were set for most losses (48), most home losses (24), fewest home wins (10), fewest points (56), lowest points percentage (.341), and fewest shootout wins (1, tied during the 2021–22 season). Niittymaki’s 29 losses tied Bernie Parent’s 1969–70 record for most losses in a single season by a Flyers goaltender.

=== Milestones ===
Milestone	Player	Date	Ref
750th game coached	Ken Hitchcock	October 5, 2006	
First game	Triston Grant	October 26, 2006	
First game	Lars Jonsson	October 26, 2006	
First game	Jussi Timonen	November 20, 2006	
First game	Martin Houle	December 13, 2006	
First game	Nate Guenin	January 18, 2007	
First game	Riley Cote	March 24, 2007	
First game	Ryan Parent	April 5, 2007	
600th assist	Peter Forsberg	January 18, 2007	
1,000th game played	Alexei Zhitnik	February 20, 2007	
1,000th game played	Derian Hatcher	April 7, 2007	

== Transactions ==
The Flyers were involved in the following transactions from June 20, 2006, the day after the deciding game of the 2006 Stanley Cup Final, through June 6, 2007, the day of the deciding game of the 2007 Stanley Cup Final.

=== Trades ===
Date	Details		Ref
June 24, 2006	To Philadelphia Flyers: 3rd-round pick in 2006; 4th-round pick in 2006	To Montreal Canadiens: Chicago's 3rd-round pick in 2006	
August 2, 2006	To Philadelphia Flyers: Eric Meloche	To Chicago Blackhawks: Rights to Vaclav Pletka	
August 4, 2006	To Philadelphia Flyers: Kyle Calder	To Chicago Blackhawks: Michal Handzus	
November 9, 2006	To Philadelphia Flyers: Darren Reid	To Tampa Bay Lightning: Daniel Corso	
November 13, 2006	To Philadelphia Flyers: Todd Fedoruk	To Anaheim Ducks: 4th-round pick in 2007; Future considerations (Note: Anaheim received the conditional right to switch 2007 5th-round picks with the Flyers, but the condition was not met.)	
December 16, 2006	To Philadelphia Flyers: Alexei Zhitnik	To New York Islanders: Freddy Meyer; Conditional draft pick (Note: The Islanders had a choice between the Flyers' third-round pick in 2007 or the Flyers' second-round pick in 2008. The Islanders chose the 2007 third-round pick.)	
December 20, 2006	To Philadelphia Flyers: Mike York	To New York Islanders: Randy Robitaille; 5th-round pick in 2008	
February 15, 2007	To Philadelphia Flyers: Ryan Parent; Scottie Upshall; 1st-round pick in 2007; 3rd-round pick in 2007	To Nashville Predators: Peter Forsberg	
February 24, 2007	To Philadelphia Flyers: Braydon Coburn	To Atlanta Thrashers: Alexei Zhitnik	
February 26, 2007	To Philadelphia Flyers: Lasse Kukkonen; 3rd-round pick in 2007	To Chicago Blackhawks: Kyle Calder	
February 27, 2007	To Philadelphia Flyers: Martin Biron	To Buffalo Sabres: 2nd-round pick in 2007	
June 4, 2007	To Philadelphia Flyers: Future considerations	To Nashville Predators: Matt Ellison	

=== Players acquired ===
Date	Player	Former team	Term	Via	Ref
June 26, 2006	Brad Tapper	Hannover Scorpions (DEL)	1-year	Free agency	
July 1, 2006	Nolan Baumgartner	Vancouver Canucks	2-year	Free agency	
July 1, 2006	Lars Jonsson	HV71 (SHL)	1-year	Free agency	
July 4, 2006	Randy Robitaille	Minnesota Wild	1-year	Free agency	
July 5, 2006	Mark Cullen	Chicago Blackhawks	1-year	Free agency	
July 5, 2006	Denis Tolpeko	Regina Pats (WHL)	3-year	Free agency	
July 13, 2006	Daniel Corso	Frankfurt Lions (DEL)	1-year	Free agency	
July 13, 2006	Martin Grenier	New York Rangers	1-year	Free agency	
July 13, 2006	Boyd Kane	Washington Capitals	1-year	Free agency	
July 19, 2006	Geoff Sanderson	Phoenix Coyotes	2-year	Free agency	
August 16, 2006	Nate Guenin	Ohio State University (CCHA)	2-year	Free agency	
December 30, 2006	Dmitry Afanasenkov	Tampa Bay Lightning		Waivers	
January 11, 2007	Michael Leighton	Nashville Predators		Waivers	
February 27, 2007	Denis Hamel	Atlanta Thrashers		Waivers	
March 15, 2007	Kyle Greentree	University of Alaska Fairbanks (CCHA)	2-year	Free agency	

=== Players lost ===
Date	Player	New team	Via (Note: In parentheses is the player's free agency group on July 1 if applicable.)	Ref
June 30, 2006	Turner Stevenson (Note: Stevenson announced his retirement on April 13, 2007.)		Buyout	
June 30, 2006	Chris Therien		Retirement (III)	
July 1, 2006	Kim Johnsson	Minnesota Wild	Free agency (III)	
July 6, 2006	Branko Radivojevic	Minnesota Wild	Free agency (UFA)	
July 14, 2006	Donald Brashear	Washington Capitals	Free agency (III)	
July 14, 2006	John Slaney	Philadelphia Phantoms (AHL)	Free agency (VI)	
July 21, 2006	Wade Skolney	Pittsburgh Penguins	Free agency (VI)	
August 1, 2006	Mark Murphy	Augsburger Panther (DEL)	Free agency (III)	
August 10, 2006	Eric Desjardins		Retirement (III)	
August 22, 2006	Stephen Wood	Peoria Rivermen (AHL)	Free agency (UFA)	
September 14, 2006	Keith Primeau		Retirement	
September 15, 2006	Ryan Ready	Iserlohn Roosters (DEL)	Free agency (VI)	
September 18, 2006	Mathieu Brunelle	Bloomington PrairieThunder (UHL)	Free agency (UFA)	
September 19, 2006	Joey Hope	Alaska Aces (ECHL)	Free agency (UFA)	
September 21, 2006	Brian Savage		Retirement (III)	
September 29, 2006	Pat Kavanagh	Portland Pirates (AHL)	Free agency (VI)	
October 2, 2006	Kiel McLeod	Victoria Salmon Kings (ECHL)	Free agency (UFA)	
November 11, 2006	Marty Murray	Los Angeles Kings	Re-entry waivers	
January 2, 2007	Petr Nedved	Edmonton Oilers	Re-entry waivers	
February 24, 2007	Nolan Baumgartner	Dallas Stars	Re-entry waivers	
February 27, 2007	Michael Leighton	Montreal Canadiens	Waivers	
April 30, 2007	Eric Meloche	Straubing Tigers (DEL)	Free agency	
June 4, 2007	David Printz	Djurgarden IF (SHL)	Free agency	

=== Signings ===
Date	Player	Term	Contract type	Ref
July 5, 2006	Antero Niittymaki	1-year	Re-signing	
July 6, 2006	R. J. Umberger	2-year	Re-signing	
July 13, 2006	Matt Ellison	1-year	Re-signing	
July 14, 2006	Joni Pitkanen	1-year	Re-signing	
July 29, 2006	David Printz	1-year	Re-signing	
September 2, 2006	Tony Voce	1-year	Re-signing	
September 11, 2006	Simon Gagne	5-year	Re-signing	
September 23, 2006	Oskars Bartulis	3-year	Entry-level	
November 29, 2006	Mike Knuble	2-year	Extension	
February 13, 2007	Sami Kapanen	2-year	Extension	
March 15, 2007	Jon Matsumoto	3-year	Entry-level	
March 27, 2007	Martin Biron	2-year	Extension	
May 11, 2007	Scottie Upshall	2-year	Extension	
May 14, 2007	Ben Eager	2-year	Extension	
May 17, 2007	Lasse Kukkonen	2-year	Extension	
May 17, 2007	David Laliberte	3-year	Entry-level	
June 1, 2007	Josh Beaulieu	3-year	Entry-level	
June 1, 2007	Jeremy Duchesne	3-year	Entry-level	

== Draft picks ==
Philadelphia's picks at the 2006 NHL entry draft, which was held at General Motors Place in Vancouver on June 24, 2006. The Flyers original third-round pick, 85th overall, was traded to the San Jose Sharks for Niko Dimitrakos on March 9, 2006.

Round	Pick	Player	Position	Nationality	Team (league)	Notes
1	22	Claude Giroux	Right wing	Canada	Gatineau Olympiques (QMJHL)	
2	39	Andreas Nodl	Right wing	Austria	Sioux Falls Stampede (USHL)	(Note: The Flyers traded the Mighty Ducks of Anaheim's 2005 second-round pick to the Phoenix Coyotes for the Coyotes' second-round pick, 39th overall, and the Columbus Blue Jackets' 2005 fourth-round pick on July 30, 2005.)
2	42	Mike Ratchuk	Defense	United States	U.S. NTDP (NAHL)	(Note: The Flyers received the Los Angeles Kings' second-round pick, 42nd overall, as compensation for the Kings hiring Dean Lombardi as their general manager.)
2	55	Denis Bodrov	Defense	Russia	Tolyatti Lada (RSL)	
3	79	Jon Matsumoto	Center	Canada	Bowling Green State University (CCHA)	(Note: The Flyers traded Eric Meloche and Patrick Sharp to the Chicago Blackhawks for Matt Ellison and the Blackhawks' third-round pick, 66th overall, on December 5, 2005. The Flyers traded the Blackhawks' pick to the Montreal Canadiens for the Canadiens' third, 79th overall, and fourth-round pick, 109th overall, on June 24, 2006.)
4	101	Joonas Lehtivuori	Defense	Finland	Ilves (SM-liiga)	(Note: The Flyers traded Dennis Seidenberg to the Phoenix Coyotes for Petr Nedved on January 20, 2006. The Flyers also had the option of swapping fourth-round picks, which was exercised resulting in the Flyers moving from the 115th overall pick to the 101st overall pick, and 2007 third-round picks, which was not exercised.)
4	109	Jakub Kovar	Goaltender	Czech Republic	Budějovice Jr. (CZE)	
5	145	Jon Rheault	Right wing	United States	Providence College (HE)	
6	175	Michael Dupont	Goaltender	Switzerland	Baie-Comeau Drakkar (QMJHL)	
7	205	Andrei Popov	Right wing	Russia	Traktor Chelyabinsk (Vysshaya Liga)	

== Farm teams ==
The Flyers were affiliated with the Philadelphia Phantoms of the AHL and the Trenton Titans of the ECHL. After an early season coaching change from Craig Berube, who joined the Flyers as an assistant, to Kjell Samuelsson, the Phantoms struggled finishing sixth in their division and missing the playoffs. Trenton finished 4th in their division and made it to the 2nd round of the playoffs before losing to the Dayton Bombers in their last season as a Flyers affiliate. Following the 2006–07 ECHL season the Titans were renamed the Trenton Devils by their new owners, the New Jersey Devils.
