= Éric Meloche =

American football player

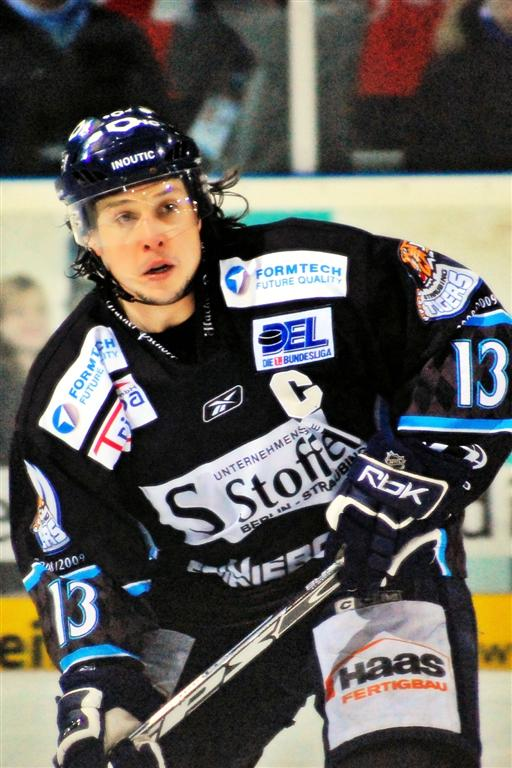
- Born: May 1, 1976 (age 50) Montreal, Quebec, Canada
- Height: 5 ft 10 in (178 cm)
- Weight: 202 lb (92 kg; 14 st 6 lb)
- Position: Right wing
- Shot: Right
- Played for: Pittsburgh Penguins; Philadelphia Flyers; Straubing Tigers (DEL)
- NHL draft: 186th overall, 1996; Pittsburgh Penguins
- Playing career: 2000–2013

Éric Meloche (born May 1, 1976) is a Canadian former professional ice hockey right winger who played in the National Hockey League (NHL) for the Pittsburgh Penguins and Philadelphia Flyers. He is the son of former player Gilles Meloche.

== Playing career ==
Meloche began his career by playing junior hockey with the Cornwall Colts of the OCJHL. After playing there for two seasons, he was selected by the Pittsburgh Penguins in the seventh round, 186th overall, of the 1996 NHL entry draft.

From there he played collegiate hockey with the Ohio State Buckeyes in the CCHA. After graduating in 2000, he played his first full season of professional hockey for the Wilkes-Barre/Scranton Penguins, the American Hockey League (AHL) affiliate of the Pittsburgh Penguins. Until 2004 he split his seasons between the two teams, but the Penguins let him become an unrestricted free agent once his contract ran out.

On July 14, 2004, he signed with the Philadelphia Flyers, who assigned him to the Philadelphia Phantoms of the AHL, with whom spent the entire season due to the lockout, and won the Calder Cup. Meloche was traded to the Chicago Blackhawks along with Patrick Sharp for Matt Ellison and a draft pick on December 5, 2005, and was immediately assigned to the Norfolk Admirals and finished the season there.

On August 2, 2006, the Flyers reacquired Meloche for European prospect Václav Pletka. After the 2006–07 NHL season, Meloche signed with the Straubing Tigers of the German Deutsche Eishockey Liga (DEL) where he spent the next four seasons.

== Awards ==
- 2004–05: Calder Cup (Philadelphia Phantoms)

== Career statistics ==
			Regular season					Playoffs
Season	Team	League	GP	G	A	Pts	PIM	GP	G	A	Pts	PIM
1994–95	Cornwall Colts	OCJHL	40	7	15	22	51	—	—	—	—	—
1995–96	Cornwall Colts	OCJHL	64	68	53	121	162	—	—	—	—	—
1996–97	Ohio State Buckeyes	CCHA	39	12	11	23	78	—	—	—	—	—
1997–98	Ohio State Buckeyes	CCHA	42	26	22	48	86	—	—	—	—	—
1998–99	Ohio State Buckeyes	CCHA	35	11	16	27	87	—	—	—	—	—
1999–00	Ohio State Buckeyes	CCHA	35	20	11	31	136	—	—	—	—	—
2000–01	Wilkes-Barre/Scranton Penguins	AHL	79	20	20	40	72	21	6	10	16	17
2001–02	Wilkes-Barre/Scranton Penguins	AHL	55	13	14	27	91	—	—	—	—	—
2001–02	Pittsburgh Penguins	NHL	23	0	1	1	8	—	—	—	—	—
2002–03	Wilkes-Barre/Scranton Penguins	AHL	59	12	17	29	95	6	1	0	1	20
2002–03	Pittsburgh Penguins	NHL	13	5	1	6	4	—	—	—	—	—
2003–04	Wilkes-Barre/Scranton Penguins	AHL	56	16	26	42	49	23	9	6	15	1
2003–04	Pittsburgh Penguins	NHL	25	3	7	10	20	—	—	—	—	—
2004–05	Philadelphia Phantoms	AHL	63	6	11	17	102	17	3	2	5	18
2005–06	Philadelphia Phantoms	AHL	10	1	2	3	16	—	—	—	—	—
2005–06	Norfolk Admirals	AHL	47	7	14	21	81	4	0	0	0	11
2006–07	Philadelphia Phantoms	AHL	49	11	13	24	82	—	—	—	—	—
2006–07	Philadelphia Flyers	NHL	13	1	2	3	4	—	—	—	—	—
2007–08	Straubing Tigers	DEL	54	17	23	40	125	—	—	—	—	—
2008–09	Straubing Tigers	DEL	49	13	20	33	148	—	—	—	—	—
2009–10	Straubing Tigers	DEL	51	22	16	38	95	—	—	—	—	—
2010–11	Straubing Tigers	DEL	49	7	14	21	124	—	—	—	—	—
2011–12	Sorel-Tracy HC Carvena	LNAH	24	8	12	20	24	—	—	—	—	—
2011–12	Saint-Georges Cool FM 103.5	LNAH	20	7	14	21	22	—	—	—	—	—
AHL totals			418	86	117	203	588	71	19	18	37	80
DEL totals			203	59	73	132	492	—	—	—	—	—
NHL totals			74	9	11	20	36	—	—	—	—	—
