= 2011 National Hockey League All-Star Game =

Professional ice hockey exhibition game

2011 NHL All-Star Game
	1	2	3	Total
Team Staal	4	2	4	10
Team Lidstrom	4	3	4	11
- Date: January 30, 2011
- Arena: RBC Center
- City: Raleigh
- MVP: Patrick Sharp (Chicago)
- Attendance: 18,680

The 2011 National Hockey League All-Star Game (also known as the 2011 National Hockey League All-Star Game presented by Discover) was played on January 30, 2011. The game took place at the RBC Center in Raleigh, home of the Carolina Hurricanes. Originally, the Game was supposed to be hosted by the Phoenix Coyotes, but due to ownership issues, the NHL decided to move the game. After bidding for the game reopened, it was awarded to Carolina and fulfilled a nine-year-old promise made to the franchise by NHL Commissioner Gary Bettman.

The 2011 version of the All-Star Game featured a break from the traditional way in which teams were organized. Instead of using conferences or player nationalities as in the past, teams were selected by captains in a fantasy draft days prior to the game. Fans still elected players to the All-Star Game, but instead of the traditional 12 starters (six for each team), they elected only six players, with the remaining 36 players involved in the game selected by the NHL. Sidney Crosby received the most votes of any player, but due to a concussion he was unable to participate in the game. The participating players voted for team captains, selecting Nicklas Lidstrom of the Detroit Red Wings and Eric Staal of the Hurricanes.

Staal won the first pick in the draft and selected longtime teammate Cam Ward, while the Toronto Maple Leafs' Phil Kessel was the last player chosen. The annual SuperSkills Competition was held the night before the Game and featured Alexander Ovechkin winning his third consecutive Breakaway Challenge. In addition, Zdeno Chara broke his own SuperSkills Competition record for hardest shot at 105.9 mph (170.4 km/h). Team Staal won the contest 33–22.

Team Lidstrom won the game 11–10, the 21 combined goals was the fourth highest total scored in an NHL All-Star Game. The first Penalty shot in All-Star Game history was called after Ovechkin threw his stick to break-up a Matt Duchene breakaway. Registering one goal and two assists, Patrick Sharp of the losing Team Staal won the Most Valuable Player Award. Jeff Skinner was the youngest player to ever play in an NHL All-Star Game. Shea Weber recorded four assists, making him only the second defenceman to accomplish the feat in one All-Star Game. Fellow defenceman Lidstrom registered a +7 rating, the highest in an All-Star Game since 1991. Winning goaltender Tim Thomas became the first goaltender in NHL history to win three consecutive All-Star Games. This had been the first NHL All-Star Game since the 2009 season, since there wasn't one in 2010 due to the 2010 Winter Olympics in Vancouver, British Columbia, Canada the first time in an NHL Market.

== Background ==
The 58th National Hockey League All-Star Game was originally scheduled to be hosted by the Phoenix Coyotes at Jobing.com Arena in Glendale, Arizona. However, due to the ongoing bankruptcy case, potential ownership changes in the Coyotes organization, and the possibility of relocation, the NHL decided to reopen bidding to host the game. In the bidding process, 14 teams made bids for All-Star Games or NHL Drafts for the next three years. Out of all the bids, the NHL chose the Carolina Hurricanes to be the new host team and on April 7, 2010, the announcement was made by NHL Commissioner Gary Bettman and Hurricanes President and General Manager Jim Rutherford.

The awarding of the All-Star Game fulfilled a nine-year-old promise Bettman made to the city of Raleigh. In 2001, he promised the organization that they would host an All-Star Game if the season ticket base reached 12,000. After reaching that plateau, Bettman indicated that other community assets were still required to secure a bid. Most notably, a proper convention center for ancillary events was needed, along with a four-star hotel, which was completed in 2009 with the new Raleigh Convention Center and adjoining Raleigh Marriott City Center in downtown Raleigh.

Three months after receiving the All-Star Game, the Hurricanes unveiled the logo for the 2011 game. The logo was designed with some homage to the host team and city hidden within it. The shape of the logo is similar to the Hurricanes primary logo, along with the team colors of red, black and silver. The banners at the top and bottom of the logo are inspired by the state flag of North Carolina.

The NHL and the city of Raleigh also presented a three-day festival to coincide with All-Star weekend called NHL All-Star Wide Open. The festivities include a series of free concerts, headlined by the band 3 Doors Down, interactive games and attractions, special appearances, Hockey Hall of Fame trophy and memorabilia displays, pin trading and trading card zones and a street party similar to the city's own annual festival, Raleigh Wide Open. There was also a charity 5K fun run, starting and ending at RBC Center with the Carolina Hurricanes "Kids 'N Community Foundation" being the beneficiary of the raised funds.

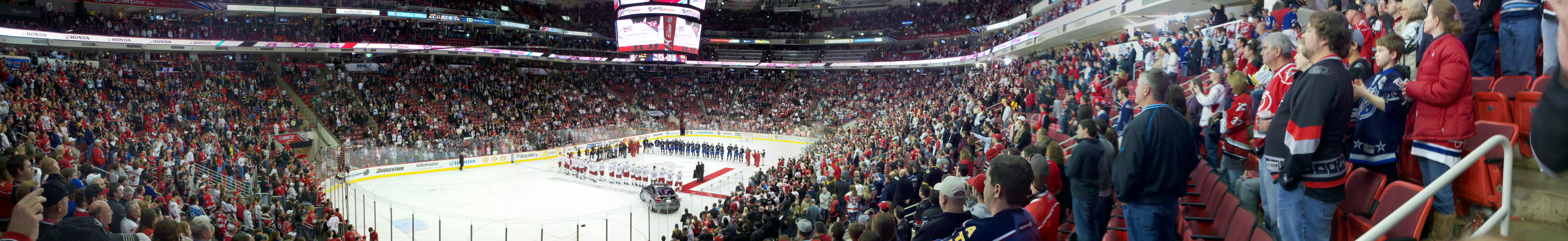

== New format ==
On November 10, 2010, the National Hockey League Players' Association (NHLPA) unveiled a new format for selecting the NHL All-Star teams: the traditional conference format was replaced by a "fantasy draft." Fans voted for six players, from either conference (three forwards, two defencemen and one goaltender), and the NHL selected another 36 players, for a total of 42 players. The chosen players then appointed two captains; the NHL and NHLPA, with input from the players, named two alternate captains for each team. Each team had two forwards and one defenceman as its captain and alternates. The captains and alternates selected their team members in a fantasy-style draft held on January 28, 2011. The first pick was determined by a coin toss, with alternating picks after the first. Teams consisted of three goaltenders, six defencemen and 12 forwards. Although the draft rules did not dictate a strict order in which positions had to be filled, to guarantee the final picks were not constrained by having to satisfy roster composition rules, the teams' three goaltenders had to be chosen by the end of round ten, and all defencemen had to be chosen by the end of round 15. According to NHL Vice President of Hockey and Business Development Brendan Shanahan, the new format was introduced to add excitement and intrigue into all the events, while make it more fun for everyone involved.

For 2011, the NHL eliminated the YoungStars Game which had been played in the previous five All-Star weekends. However, rookies were still featured at the Super Skills Competition. A group of 12 Calder Trophy-eligible players were split into two groups of six. At the conclusion of the fantasy draft's 15th round, one rookie was selected from the 12 to choose which team his group would join for the competition.

This was the first time the traditional "East vs. West" format was not used since 2002, when the World All-Star Team defeated North America 8–5 in Los Angeles.

== Uniforms ==
The All-Star uniforms that debuted in this game featured a unique striping pattern coming from the back of the shoulders going down the arms. As the main stripe crossed below the elbow, it, and the radiating stripes coming from it, switched from the back of the sleeves to the front. The front of the jersey also featured the player's number between the collar and the large NHL crest, an unusual placement for a uniform number. Team Staal wore white uniforms with red trim, while Team Lidstrom wore navy blue uniforms with lighter blue trim. These uniforms would return for the next All-Star Game.

== The Guardian Project ==
During the All-Star weekend, the NHL announced a new "superhero franchise", The Guardian Project. Created by comic book writer Stan Lee, the project featured 30 new superheroes representing the 30 NHL teams, all which were unveiled at the All-Star Game. The goal of the project was to appeal to pre-teen and teenage boys in hopes of bringing in "new audience to the NHL, while engaging the existing, established hockey fan base through a compelling tale of good vs. evil."

== Voting ==
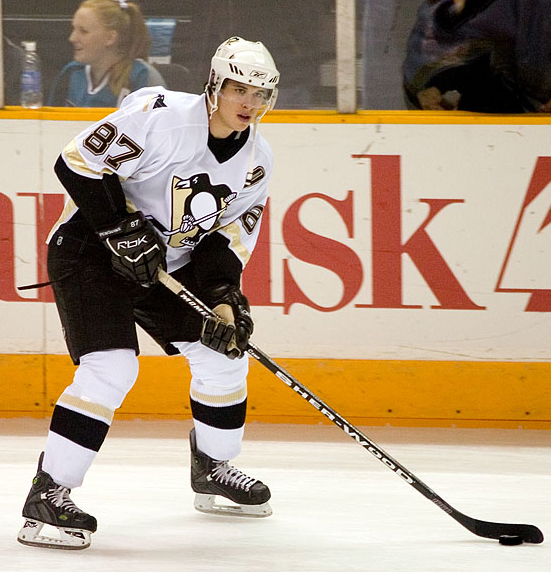
Sidney Crosby received more votes than any other player

One hundred players were chosen to be on the ballot for the All-Star Game (minimum of two players from each team), but fans were also given the option to write in any player who was not listed. Ballots were all digital for the fourth consecutive time, giving fans the ability to cast votes online at NHL.com and Facebook. Votes could also be cast via text messages from mobile devices and Smartphone users could vote by way of a mobile ballot feature. The NHL put no limitation on the number of votes an individual could cast. When fan balloting ended, 14.3 million votes had been cast and the top six were named to the All-Star Game. The six top vote recipients were from only two teams, the Pittsburgh Penguins (4) and Chicago Blackhawks (2). Individually, Sidney Crosby led all players with 635,509 votes, while teammate Kris Letang was elected as a write-in candidate. The six players elected by the fans are listed below with their vote totals.

No.	Name	Pos.	Team	Votes
87	Sidney Crosby	C	Pittsburgh Penguins	635,509
19	Jonathan Toews	C	Chicago Blackhawks	407,676
71	Evgeni Malkin	C	Pittsburgh Penguins	376,887
58	Kris Letang	D	Pittsburgh Penguins	477,960
2	Duncan Keith	D	Chicago Blackhawks	382,162
29	Marc-Andre Fleury	G	Pittsburgh Penguins	426,305

== Draft ==
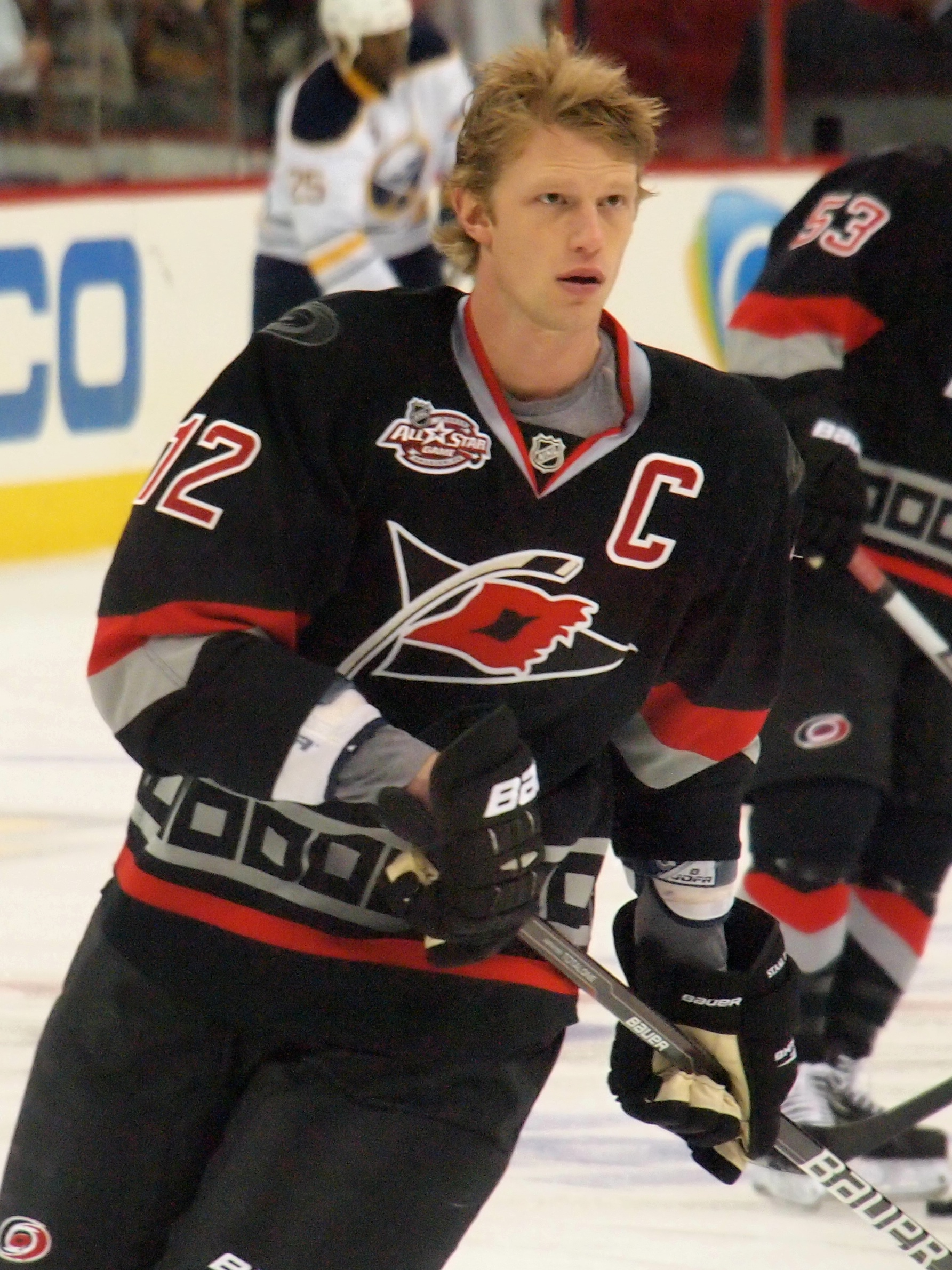
Eric Staal had the first choice in the fantasy draft

After naming the remaining All-Stars, each player voted for team captains. The players selected the 12-time All-Star, Nicklas Lidstrom, and the captain of the host Carolina Hurricanes, Eric Staal. Lidstrom was assigned the home blue uniforms while Staal received the away whites. The NHL further named their alternate captains, placing Ryan Kesler and Mike Green with Staal while Patrick Kane and Martin St. Louis joined Team Lidstrom. Prior to the draft, the NHL determined head coaches for the teams via a coin toss. Chicago's Joel Quenneville and his assistant, Mike Haviland, were named coaches as a result of winning the Stanley Cup last year. Philadelphia Flyers head coach Peter Laviolette and the Vancouver Canucks' Alain Vigneault earned the distinction by having the highest winning percentage through January 8, 2011. After the coin toss, Quenneville was assigned to Team Staal, while Laviolette and Vigneault were given Team Lidstrom.

Team Staal won the first pick in the draft, and Eric Staal chose longtime teammate Cam Ward with his first pick. With the fifth pick in the draft, Team Staal selected Daniel Sedin. His twin brother Henrik was taken with the next pick by Team Lidstrom. The All-Star Game marked the first time the two have ever played against each other in an organized game. Throughout the draft, Eric Staal selected players that had a personal connection with him. He selected his brother, Rangers defenceman Marc Staal, in the seventh round, fellow Thunder Bay native Patrick Sharp in the eighth round, and teammate Jeff Skinner in the 11th round. The last player selected was Toronto's Phil Kessel. As a reward for being the last selection, he was given a new car and $20,000 was given to the charity of his choice. Kessel stated he would put the money toward a cancer charity he became involved with in 2006 when he was battling testicular cancer. When the time came for the rookies to decide which team they would participate in the skills competition, Taylor Hall, who won the right via a puck flip, chose Team Lidstrom for his group. All players were allowed to wear the numbers they use in their respective teams. For Team Lidstrom, Henrik Sedin and Dustin Byfuglien both wore number 33, while Brad Richards and Steven Stamkos wore number 91. Team Staal had three pairs having same number: Patrick Sharp and Corey Perry with number 10, Daniel Sedin and Dan Boyle with number 22 and Paul Stastny and Patrik Elias with number 26. The complete team rosters are listed below with players appearing in the order in which they were chosen.

Team Staal
Round	Nat.	Player	Team	Pos.	Num.
C	(Canada)	Eric Staal	Carolina Hurricanes	C	12
A	(Canada)	Mike Green	Washington Capitals	D	52
A	(United States)	Ryan Kesler	Vancouver Canucks	C	17
1	(Canada)	Cam Ward	Carolina Hurricanes	G	30
2	(Russia)	Alexander Ovechkin	Washington Capitals	LW	8
3	(Sweden)	Daniel Sedin	Vancouver Canucks	LW	22
4	(Slovakia)	Zdeno Chara	Boston Bruins	D	33
5	(Canada)	Rick Nash	Columbus Blue Jackets	RW	61
6	(Sweden)	Henrik Lundqvist	New York Rangers	G	30
7	(Canada)	Marc Staal	New York Rangers	D	18
8	(Canada)	Patrick Sharp	Chicago Blackhawks	LW	10
9	(Canada)	Dan Boyle	San Jose Sharks	D	22
10	(Canada)	Carey Price	Montreal Canadiens	G	31
11	(Canada)	Jeff Skinner^{[E]}	Carolina Hurricanes	C	53
12	(Canada)	Kris Letang	Pittsburgh Penguins	D	58
13	(Canada)	Claude Giroux	Philadelphia Flyers	RW	28
14	(Sweden)	Erik Karlsson	Ottawa Senators	D	65
15	(Canada)	Corey Perry	Anaheim Ducks	RW	10
16	(Czech Republic)	Patrik Elias	New Jersey Devils	LW	26
17	(United States)	David Backes	St. Louis Blues	RW	42
18	(United States)	Paul Stastny^{[D]}	Colorado Avalanche	C	26
–	Head coach: Joel Quenneville			–	–
–	Assistant coach: Mike Haviland			–	–

Team Staal Rookies
Nat.	Player	Team	Pos.	Num.
(Canada)	Logan Couture	San Jose Sharks	C	29
(Canada)	Tyler Ennis	Buffalo Sabres	LW	63
(Austria)	Michael Grabner	New York Islanders	RW	40
(United States)	Jamie McBain^{[F]}	Carolina Hurricanes	D	4
(Canada)	Tyler Seguin	Boston Bruins	C	19
(Canada)	P. K. Subban^{[G]}	Montreal Canadiens	D	76

Team Lidstrom
Round	Nat.	Player	Team	Pos.	Num.
C	(Sweden)	Nicklas Lidstrom	Detroit Red Wings	D	5
A	(United States)	Patrick Kane	Chicago Blackhawks	RW	88
A	(Canada)	Martin St. Louis	Tampa Bay Lightning	RW	26
1	(Canada)	Steven Stamkos	Tampa Bay Lightning	C	91
2	(Canada)	Duncan Keith	Chicago Blackhawks	D	2
3	(Sweden)	Henrik Sedin	Vancouver Canucks	C	33
4	(Canada)	Shea Weber	Nashville Predators	D	6
5	(United States)	Tim Thomas	Boston Bruins	G	30
6	(Canada)	Daniel Briere^{[A]}	Philadelphia Flyers	RW	48
7	(United States)	Dustin Byfuglien	Atlanta Thrashers	D	33
8	(Canada)	Jonathan Toews	Chicago Blackhawks	C	19
9	(Canada)	Marc-Andre Fleury	Pittsburgh Penguins	G	29
10	(Switzerland)	Jonas Hiller	Anaheim Ducks	G	1
11	(Canada)	Brad Richards	Dallas Stars	C	91
12	(United States)	Keith Yandle^{[B]}	Phoenix Coyotes	D	3
13	(Canada)	Brent Burns	Minnesota Wild	D	8
14	(Czech Republic)	Martin Havlat^{[C]}	Minnesota Wild	LW	14
15	(Slovenia)	Anze Kopitar	Los Angeles Kings	C	11
16	(Canada)	Matt Duchene	Colorado Avalanche	C	9
17	(Sweden)	Loui Eriksson	Dallas Stars	LW	21
18	(United States)	Phil Kessel	Toronto Maple Leafs	RW	81
–	Co-head coach: Alain Vigneault			–	–
–	Co-head coach: Peter Laviolette			–	–

Team Lidstrom Rookies
Nat.	Player	Team	Pos.	Num.
(Canada)	Taylor Hall	Edmonton Oilers	LW	4
(United States)	Cam Fowler	Anaheim Ducks	D	4
(Russia)	Evgeny Dadonov	Florida Panthers	RW	63
(Sweden)	Oliver Ekman-Larsson	Phoenix Coyotes	D	23
(United States)	Kevin Shattenkirk	Colorado Avalanche	D	8
(United States)	Derek Stepan	New York Rangers	C	21

=== Withdrawn ===
Prior to the draft several players withdrew due to injury or, in the case of Jarome Iginla, family concerns.

Name	Pos.	Team	Notes	Ref
Jarome Iginla	F	Calgary Flames	Withdrew due to family concerns	
Sidney Crosby	F	Pittsburgh Penguins	Concussion	
Ales Hemsky	F	Edmonton Oilers	Concussion	
Evgeni Malkin	F	Pittsburgh Penguins	Sinus infection and a knee injury	
Tobias Enstrom	D	Atlanta Thrashers	Broken finger	
Jordan Eberle (rookie)	F	Edmonton Oilers	Ankle injury	

== SuperSkills Competition ==
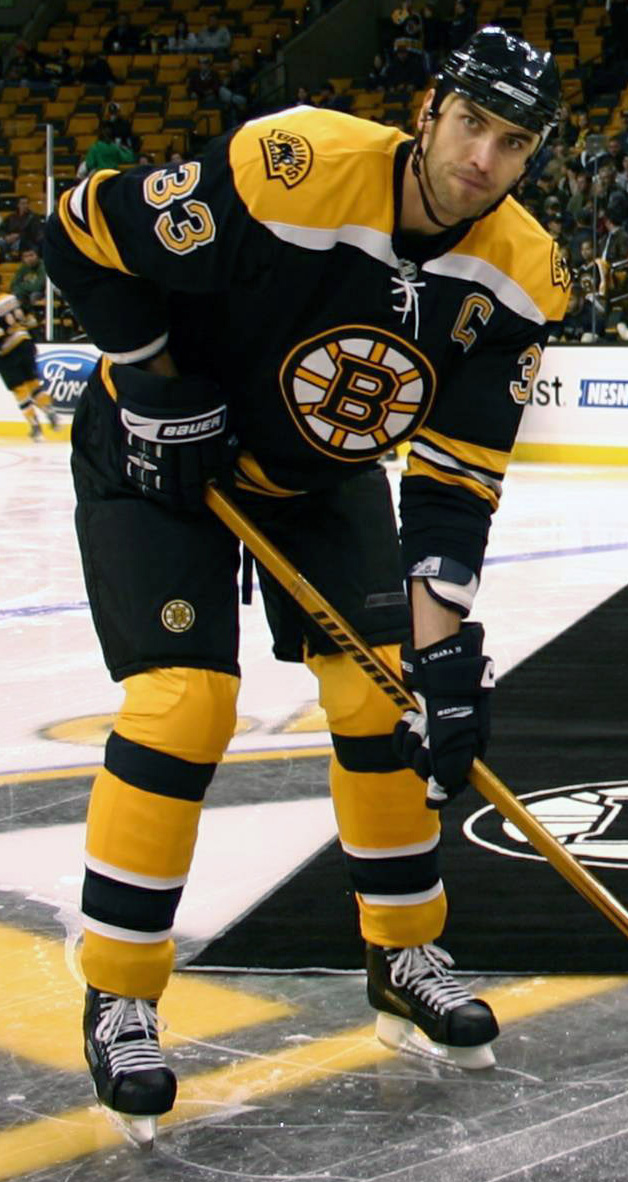
Zdeno Chara broke his own record during the Hardest Shot competition

The SuperSkills competition began with the Fastest Skater competition, where the competitors skated one lap around the rink. The winner of each round earned a point for their team. The opening round was skated backwards, followed by each team's rookie representative. Then two goaltenders skated off before returning to the traditional form. Following preliminary rounds the two fastest competitors from each team faced off in a final round, where Michael Grabner defeated Taylor Hall earning two points for Team Staal. The Breakaway Challenge featured six players (three from each team) taking four shoot-out attempts. Fans voted for the winner via text message. The winner earned four points for his team. Second place was awarded three points and third received one point. Alexander Ovechkin won by a wide margin defeating second place P. K. Subban by over 17 percentage points, it was the third consecutive win in the competition by Ovechkin. Loui Eriksson finished third to round out the point earners from the competition. The Shooting Accuracy featured two players shooting targets in the four corners of the net. Winners were determined by the fastest player to hit all four targets. Daniel Sedin hit all four targets on four shots in his first round setting the overall fastest time hitting them all in just 7.3 seconds. He followed that up by hitting four in five shots during the final round to defeat the Blackhawks' Patrick Kane.

Following Shooting Accuracy, both teams participated in the Skills Challenge Relay. Each team broke into two groups and went through a series of drills designed to showcase players' skills. It started with one timers, then proceeded to passing, where a single player had to complete a pass into six small nets. From there it went to the Puck Control Relay, having a participant skate through a series of cones with a puck. Another player then took on the Stick Handling drill, controlling a puck through a series of stationary pucks. The relay ended when a final player completed the Shooting Accuracy, again hitting all four targets. The two groups from Team Lidstrom finished first and third in the competition, gaining their team a total of five points. During the Hardest Shot competition reigning champion Zdeno Chara was defeated in his preliminary round match up by Shea Weber. In the final round, Chara again matched up with Weber. Chara successfully defended his title by defeating Weber with a shot registering 105.9 mph. The speed set a new SuperSkills record surpassing his own record and marking the fourth time he has won the event. Despite being down by a large margin prior to the Elimination Shootout, Team Lidstrom still had an opportunity to win the contest. Players continued to shoot provided they scored – scoring one point per goal, until only one player remained. However, the shoot-out was won by Team Staal's Corey Perry as he was the only player to score in all three of his attempts. The full results are listed below.

Event	Winner	Result	Team	Score (TS–TL)
Bridgestone NHL Fastest Skater	Kris Letang def. Duncan Keith	16.132 sec. to 16.167 sec.	Team Staal	1–0
Bridgestone NHL Fastest Skater	Michael Grabner def. Taylor Hall	14.061 to 14.621	Team Staal	2–0
Bridgestone NHL Fastest Skater	Cam Ward def. Tim Thomas	18.895 to 19.000	Team Staal	3–0
Bridgestone NHL Fastest Skater	Martin St. Louis def. Ryan Kesler	14.763 to 14.786	Team Lidstrom	3–1
Bridgestone NHL Fastest Skater	Steven Stamkos def. Mike Green	14.731 to 15.200	Team Lidstrom	3–2
Bridgestone NHL Fastest Skater	Matt Duchene def. Marc Staal	14.779 to 15.100	Team Lidstrom	3–3
Bridgestone NHL Fastest Skater	Final Round; Grabner def. Hall	14.238 to 14.715	Team Staal	Round total 5–3
BlackBerry NHL Breakaway Challenge	Alexander Ovechkin	38.5% of votes	Team Staal	12–4
McDonald's NHL Accuracy Shooting	Ryan Kesler def. Brad Richards	9.6 sec.	Team Staal	13–4
McDonald's NHL Accuracy Shooting	Logan Couture def. Derek Stepan	12.3	Team Staal	14–4
McDonald's NHL Accuracy Shooting	Jonathan Toews def. Patrick Sharp	8.8	Team Lidstrom	14–5
McDonald's NHL Accuracy Shooting	Rick Nash def. Phil Kessel	17.9	Team Staal	15–5
McDonald's NHL Accuracy Shooting	Patrick Kane def. Eric Staal	8.7	Team Lidstrom	15–6
McDonald's NHL Accuracy Shooting	Daniel Sedin def. Martin Havlat	7.3	Team Staal	16–6
McDonald's NHL Accuracy Shooting	Final Round; D. Sedin def. Kane	8.9	Team Staal	Round total 18–6
G-Series NHL Challenge Relay	Team Lidstrom Group 1 (Oliver Ekman-Larsson, Nicklas Lidstrom, Brad Richards, Loui Eriksson, Henrik Sedin, Martin St. Louis, Matt Duchene, Jonathan Toews)	2:09 min.	Team Lidstrom	21–11
XM NHL Hardest Shot	Brent Burns def. David Backes	98.4 mph to 96.9 mph	Team Lidstrom	21–12
XM NHL Hardest Shot	Tyler Seguin def. Cam Fowler	97.1 to 93.8	Team Staal	22–12
XM NHL Hardest Shot	Patrick Sharp def. Anze Kopitar	94.6 to 94.5	Team Staal	23–12
XM NHL Hardest Shot	Shea Weber def. Zdeno Chara	104.8 to 104.1	Team Lidstrom	23–13
XM NHL Hardest Shot	Dustin Byfuglien def. Rick Nash	102.4 to 91.4	Team Lidstrom	23–14
XM NHL Hardest Shot	Steven Stamkos def. Alex Ovechkin	101.9 to 98.2	Team Lidstrom	23–15
XM NHL Hardest Shot	Final Round; Chara def. Weber	105.9^{[H]} to 103.4	Team Staal	Round total 25–15
Discover NHL Elimination Shootout	Corey Perry	3 for 3	Team Staal	33–22
Overall			Team Staal	33–22

== Game play ==
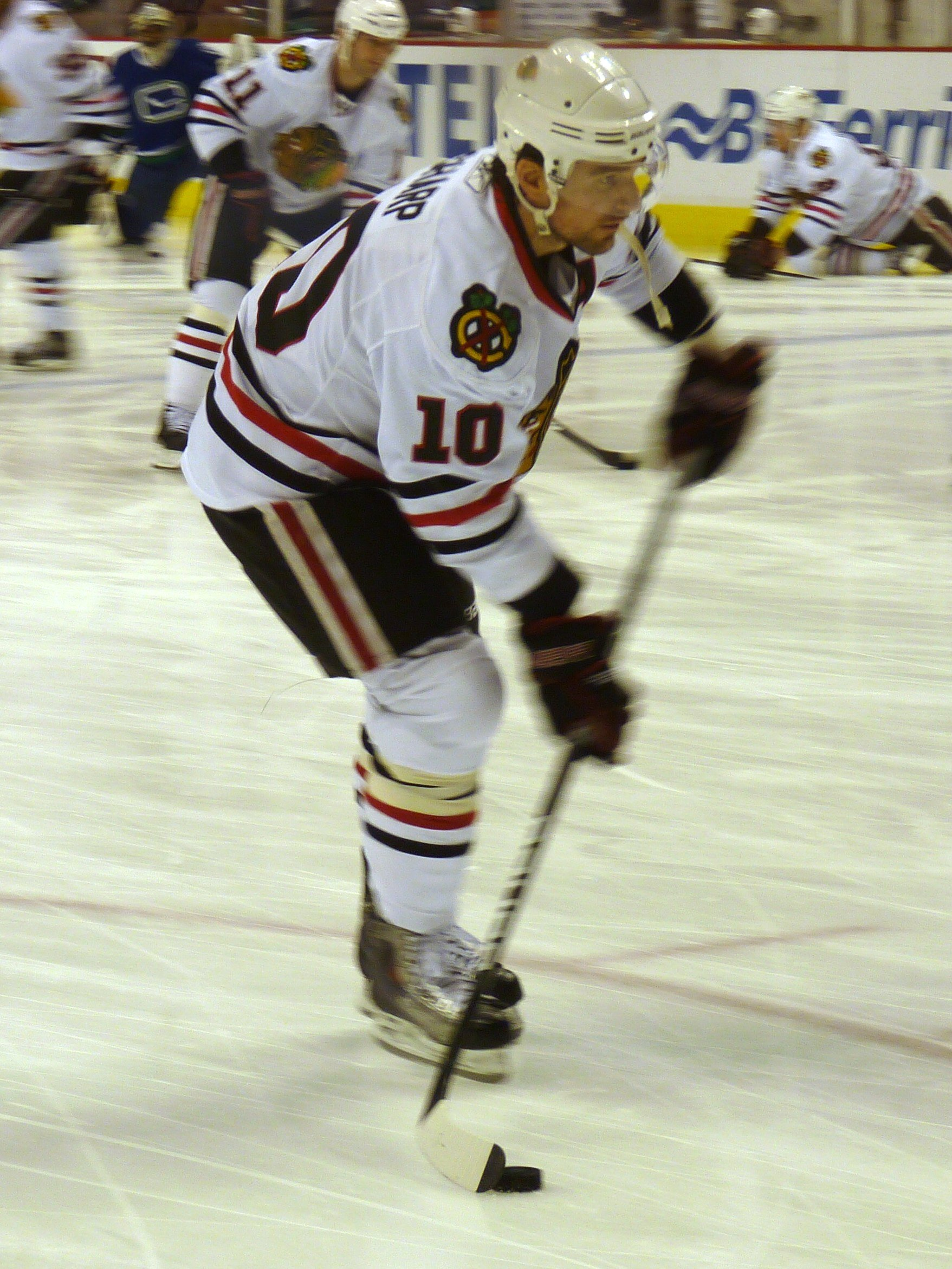
Patrick Sharp was named the All-Star Game MVP

The scoring started early in the game as Team Staal's Alexander Ovechkin scored the game's first goal in just 50 seconds into the first period. When he took his first shift Jeff Skinner officially became the youngest player to play in an All-Star game (18 years, 259 days) surpassing the mark set in 1984 by Steve Yzerman by eight days. By the time Claude Giroux scored, less than five minutes later, Team Staal had opened up a 4–0 lead. Team Lidstrom's Marc-Andre Fleury allowed the four goals on only nine shots while his counterpart Cam Ward stopped the first four shots he faced. The tide turned a little over halfway through the first period when Anze Kopitar scored on a backhand shot. Team Lidstrom completed the first period comeback with under four minutes left in the period when Eriksson and Matt Duchene scored 23 seconds apart to tie the game at four. Team Lidstrom finished the period scoring on four of their final ten shots.

Team Staal recaptured the lead early in the second with goals by Patrick Sharp and Kris Letang. They were unable to hold the lead though as Team Lidstrom tied the game at six with a second goal from Kopitar and one by Steven Stamkos. They quickly took their first lead on a goal by Daniel Briere just 1:20 later, ending the period up 7–6.

Early in the third period Eric Staal tied the game at seven with his first goal of the game. Minutes later Duchene got a breakaway, but before he could take a shot, Ovechkin threw his stick at the puck, resulting in the first penalty shot in All-Star game history, and only the third penalty assessed during the past ten years of All-Star competition. Duchene took the shot against Henrik Lundqvist, who stopped the attempt. Kris Letang scored shortly after the penalty shot to give back the lead to Team Staal. Briere scored a little over a minute later assisted by Weber and Henrik Sedin to re-tie the game. Weber's assist was his fourth of the game making him the second defenceman in history to record four assists in an All-Star Game (Ray Bourque, 1985). Team Lidstrom added two more goals before Rick Nash scored to cut the deficit to one. With about a minute and a half left in the game, Team Staal pulled their goaltender for the extra attacker. The decision backfired as Eriksson scored on the empty net with 1:11 remaining. Eric Staal scored with 33.6 seconds remaining to bring his team back within one goal, but they failed to get another shot on goal before time ran out. By coming back from a four-goal deficit to win the game Team Lidstrom set the record for biggest comeback victory in All-Star history. Lidstrom finished the game with a +7 rating, the highest rating since 1991 when Adam Oates was also a +7 for the Wales Conference. Tim Thomas earned the victory becoming the first goaltender to win three straight All-Star Games. Patrick Sharp was named Most Valuable Player (MVP) after registering one goal and two assists in a losing cause for Team Staal. The combined 21 goals was the fourth highest total in NHL All-Star Game history.

=== Summary ===
Team Staal	10 – 11 (4-4, 2–3, 4-4)	Team Lidstrom	RBC Center (18,680); Raleigh, North Carolina
First period
Ovechkin (Chara, Green) 0:50	Referees:
Stastny (Sharp, Backes) 2:48	Tom Kowal
Elias (Stastny, Green) 3:20	Kevin Pollock
Giroux (Sharp, Backes) 5:41
10:50 Kopitar (Weber)	Linesmen:
13:17 Byfuglien (Kane, Keith)	Don Henderson
16:07 Eriksson (Toews)	Darren Gibbs
16:30 Duchene (Lidstrom, Weber)
Second period	MVP: Patrick Sharp
Sharp (Giroux) 1:18
Letang (D. Sedin, Ovechkin) 6:10
10:08 Kopitar (2) (Eriksson, Havlat)
14:11 Stamkos (St. Louis, Richards)
15:31 Briere (H. Sedin, Weber)
Third period
E. Staal (Perry, Nash) 3:49
Letang (2) (Elias, Skinner) 8:46
9:57 Briere (2) (H. Sedin, Weber)
10:45 Toews (Eriksson, Havlat)
13:53 St. Louis (Burns)
Nash (Perry, Chara) 15:11
18:49 Eriksson (2) (GWG)(EN) (Toews, Havlat)
E. Staal (2) (Boyle, Backes) 19:39

W – Tim Thomas L – Henrik Lundqvist

Key

- Player1 (Player2, Player3) 1:00 denotes that Player1 scored a goal after 1:00, with assists from Player2 and Player3.
- GWG denotes the game-winning goal.
- EN denotes an empty net goal
- W denotes the goaltender awarded the win.
- L denotes the goaltender assigned the loss.

Source: NHL

== Notes ==
A: Briere was named as a replacement for Iginla.
B: Yandle was named as a replacement for Enstrom.
C: Havlat was named as a replacement for Hemsky.
D: Stastny was named as a replacement for Crosby.
E: Skinner was named as a replacement for Malkin.
F: McBain replaced Eberle on the rookie team.
G: Subban was named as a replacement for Skinner who was promoted from the rookie team to the All-Star Game.
H: Chara's shot was 105.9 mph (170.4 km/h), a new record.
