= Matt Ellison =

Canadian ice hockey player (born 1983)

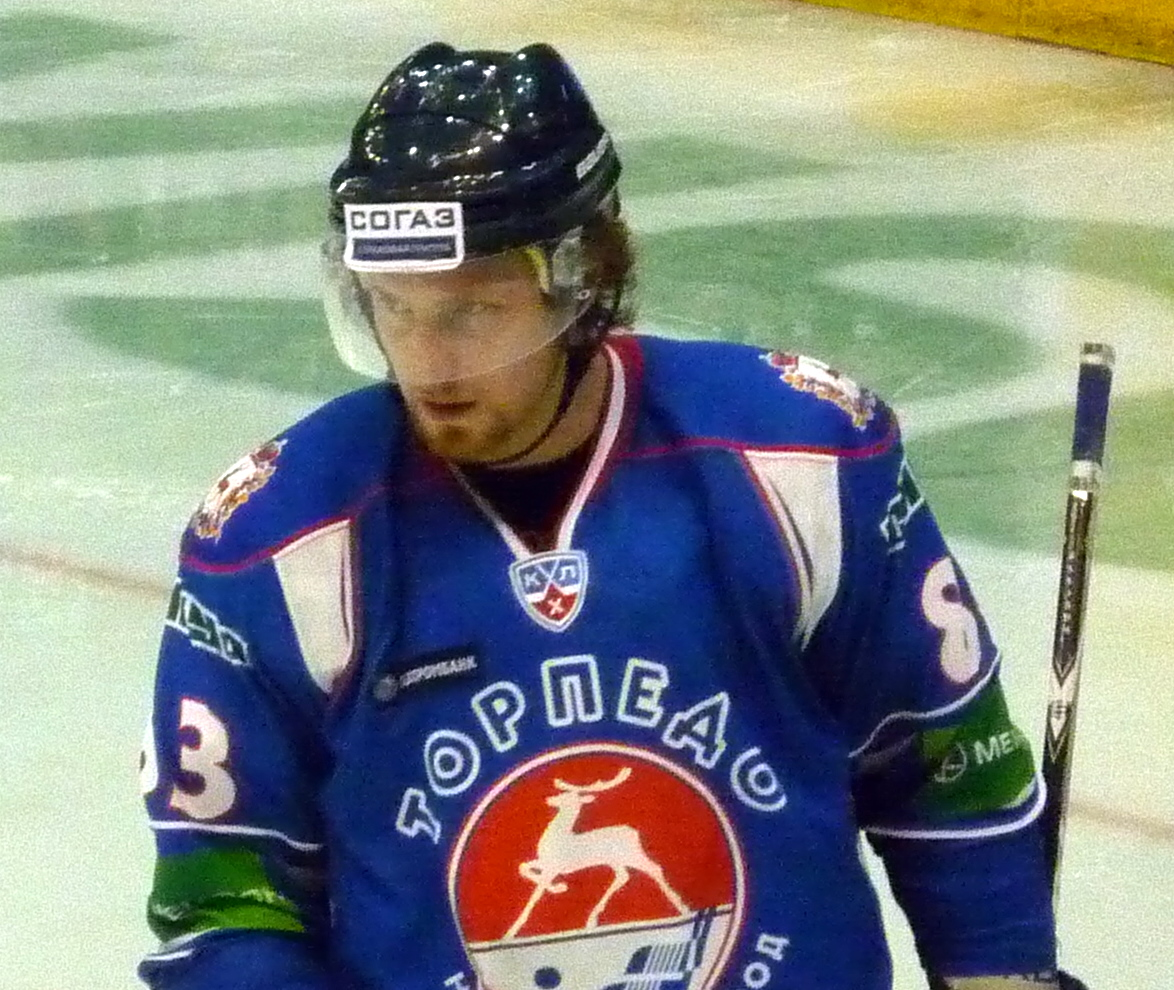
- Born: December 8, 1983 (age 42) Duncan, British Columbia, Canada
- Height: 6 ft 0 in (183 cm)
- Weight: 192 lb (87 kg; 13 st 10 lb)
- Position: Right wing
- Shot: Right
- Played for: Chicago Blackhawks; Philadelphia Flyers; Dinamo Riga; HC MVD; Torpedo Nizhny Novgorod; EHC Biel; KHL Medveščak Zagreb; HC Dinamo Minsk; Metallurg Magnitogorsk
- NHL draft: 128th overall, 2002; Chicago Blackhawks
- Playing career: 2003–2019

Matt Ellison (born December 8, 1983) is a Canadian former professional ice hockey right winger. Drafted in the 2002 NHL entry draft by Chicago Blackhawks of the National Hockey League (NHL), Ellison played for the Blackhawks minor teams with two stints in the NHL, before being traded in 2005 to the Philadelphia Flyers. After being traded to the Nashville Predators in 2007, Ellison played one season for the Predators AHL team before moving to play in Europe in 2008. Ellison most notably played abroad in the Kontinental Hockey League (KHL).

== Playing career ==
Ellison began his career with the Cowichan Valley Capitals, a junior hockey team that is a part of the BCHL, in 1999–00. In his rookie season he was selected as the club's Co-Rookie of the Year. He played there for three years and received several honors including the Capital's Three Star Award winner and MVP, and led the team in scoring with 66 points in 2000–01 and again with 117 points in 2001–02. He was then drafted by the Chicago Blackhawks in the fourth round (128th overall) of the 2002 NHL entry draft.

He proceeded to play with the Red Deer Rebels of the WHL during the 2002–03 season before joining the Norfolk Admirals for the 2003–04 season of the AHL. He played two seasons with the Norfolk Admirals and was promoted to the Blackhawks to start the 2005–06 season.

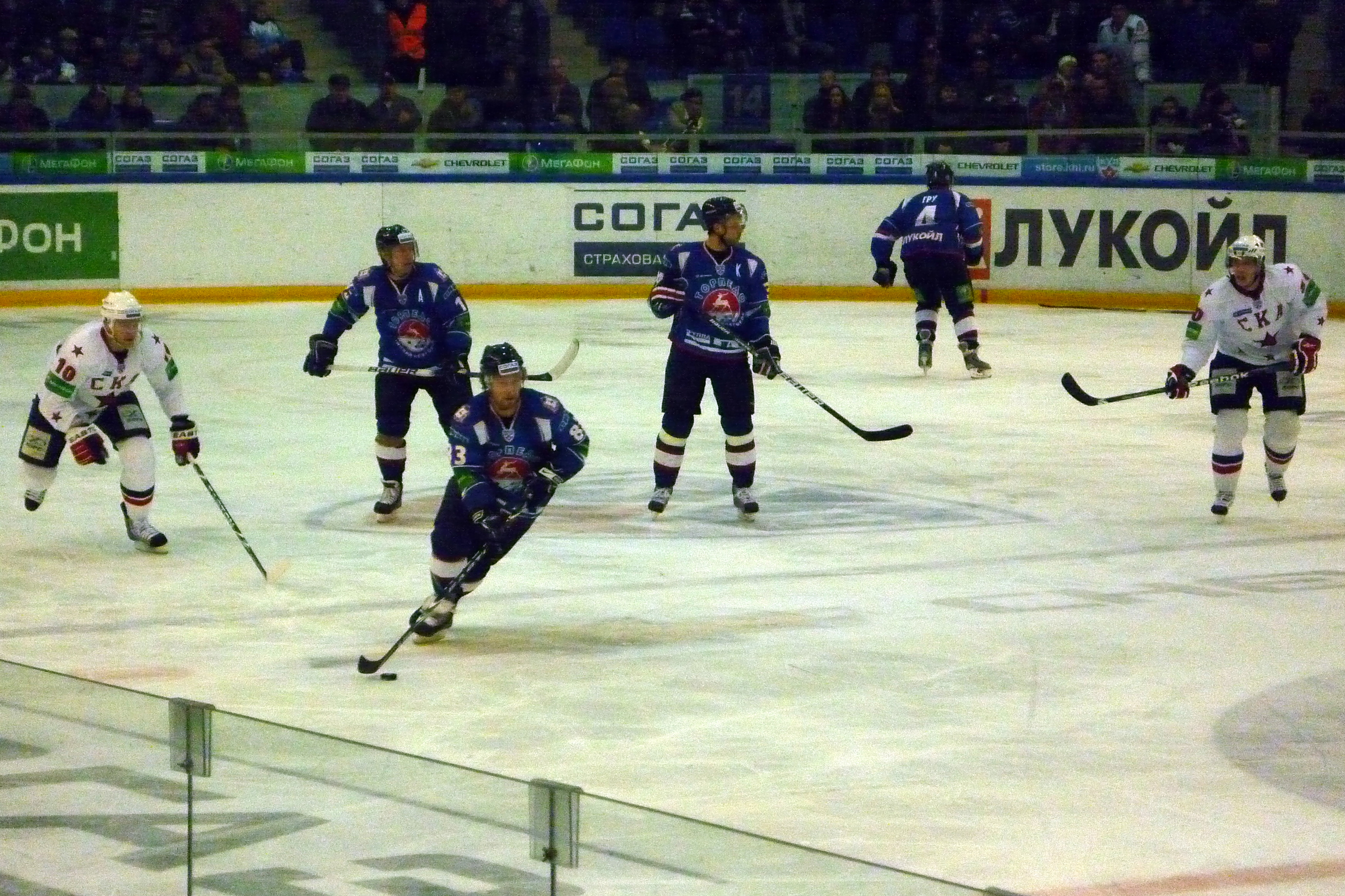
Matt Ellison playing for Torpedo in 2010.

On December 5, 2005, he was traded to the Philadelphia Flyers for Patrick Sharp and Éric Meloche. He spent most of his time in Philadelphia playing for the Philadelphia Phantoms and was traded to the Nashville Predators on June 4, 2007, for future considerations.

On July 4, 2008, Ellison signed a one-year contract in Latvia with the Dinamo Riga of the Kontinental Hockey League. Ellison scored 39 points in 55 games, placing second with Riga in scoring for 2008–09. On August 4, 2009, he then signed a contract with fellow KHL team, HC MVD.

After three successful seasons with Torpedo Nizhny Novgorod, Ellison left the KHL and signed a one-year contract with Swiss club, EHC Biel of the NLA on June 26, 2013. Ellison subsequently left Biel and returned to the KHL to play for Zagreb in the 2013–14 season. In 2014, Ellison signed a two-year contract with Belarusian club, HC Dinamo Minsk, starting from the 2014–15 season.

After three prolific seasons with Minsk, leading the club in scoring in his final two, Ellison left as a free agent to sign a lucrative two-year contract with larger Russian club, Metallurg Magnitogorsk, on June 7, 2017.

== Career statistics ==
| | | | Regular season | | | | | Playoffs |
| Season | Team | League | GP | G | A | Pts | PIM | GP | G | A | Pts | PIM |
|---|---|---|---|---|---|---|---|---|---|---|---|---|
| 1998–99 | Kerry Park Islanders | VIJHL | 38 | 40 | 47 | 87 | 110 | — | — | — | — | — |
| 1998–99 | Cowichan Valley Capitals | BCHL | 1 | 0 | 0 | 0 | 0 | — | — | — | — | — |
| 1999–00 | Cowichan Valley Capitals | BCHL | 60 | 11 | 23 | 34 | 95 | — | — | — | — | — |
| 2000–01 | Cowichan Valley Capitals | BCHL | 60 | 22 | 44 | 66 | 102 | — | — | — | — | — |
| 2001–02 | Cowichan Valley Capitals | BCHL | 60 | 42 | 75 | 117 | 76 | 9 | 5 | 6 | 11 | 8 |
| 2002–03 | Red Deer Rebels | WHL | 72 | 40 | 56 | 96 | 80 | 22 | 7 | 13 | 20 | 28 |
| 2003–04 | Norfolk Admirals | AHL | 71 | 14 | 21 | 35 | 115 | 7 | 0 | 1 | 1 | 4 |
| 2003–04 | Chicago Blackhawks | NHL | 10 | 0 | 1 | 1 | 0 | — | — | — | — | — |
| 2004–05 | Norfolk Admirals | AHL | 71 | 14 | 37 | 51 | 44 | 5 | 0 | 1 | 1 | 2 |
| 2005–06 | Chicago Blackhawks | NHL | 26 | 3 | 9 | 12 | 17 | — | — | — | — | — |
| 2005–06 | Philadelphia Flyers | NHL | 5 | 0 | 1 | 1 | 0 | — | — | — | — | — |
| 2005–06 | Philadelphia Phantoms | AHL | 48 | 12 | 13 | 25 | 35 | — | — | — | — | — |
| 2006–07 | Philadelphia Phantoms | AHL | 62 | 12 | 27 | 39 | 43 | — | — | — | — | — |
| 2006–07 | Philadelphia Flyers | NHL | 2 | 0 | 0 | 0 | 0 | — | — | — | — | — |
| 2007–08 | Milwaukee Admirals | AHL | 75 | 26 | 32 | 58 | 55 | 5 | 0 | 0 | 0 | 2 |
| 2008–09 | Dinamo Riga | KHL | 55 | 15 | 22 | 37 | 84 | 3 | 0 | 1 | 1 | 0 |
| 2009–10 | HC MVD | KHL | 52 | 16 | 18 | 34 | 102 | 22 | 4 | 5 | 9 | 10 |
| 2010–11 | Torpedo Nizhny Novgorod | KHL | 53 | 21 | 29 | 50 | 28 | — | — | — | — | — |
| 2011–12 | Torpedo Nizhny Novgorod | KHL | 25 | 10 | 10 | 20 | 14 | — | — | — | — | — |
| 2012–13 | Torpedo Nizhny Novgorod | KHL | 33 | 3 | 14 | 17 | 10 | — | — | — | — | — |
| 2013–14 | EHC Biel | NLA | 7 | 0 | 1 | 1 | 4 | — | — | — | — | — |
| 2013–14 | KHL Medveščak Zagreb | KHL | 38 | 8 | 7 | 15 | 28 | 4 | 3 | 0 | 3 | 0 |
| 2014–15 | HC Dinamo Minsk | KHL | 58 | 24 | 33 | 57 | 38 | 5 | 1 | 2 | 3 | 2 |
| 2015–16 | HC Dinamo Minsk | KHL | 54 | 26 | 29 | 55 | 54 | — | — | — | — | — |
| 2016–17 | HC Dinamo Minsk | KHL | 54 | 16 | 33 | 49 | 85 | 5 | 2 | 0 | 2 | 2 |
| 2017–18 | Metallurg Magnitogorsk | KHL | 55 | 20 | 25 | 45 | 24 | 10 | 2 | 2 | 4 | 27 |
| 2018–19 | Metallurg Magnitogorsk | KHL | 62 | 20 | 35 | 55 | 34 | 6 | 2 | 0 | 2 | 0 |
| NHL totals | | | 43 | 3 | 11 | 14 | 19 | — | — | — | — | — |
| KHL totals | | | 539 | 179 | 255 | 434 | 501 | 55 | 14 | 10 | 24 | 41 |

== Awards and honours ==
Medal record

Ice hockey

Representing Canada

Spengler Cup
| Gold medal – first place | 2015 Davos | |

| Award | Year |
|---|---|
WHL
| Jim Piggott Memorial Trophy | 2003 |
| East Second All-Star Team | 2003 |
| CHL All-Rookie Team | 2003 |
| CHL Rookie of the Year | 2003 |
KHL
| All-Star Game | 2016, 2017 |
