= Patrick Sharp =

Canadian hockey player (born 1981)

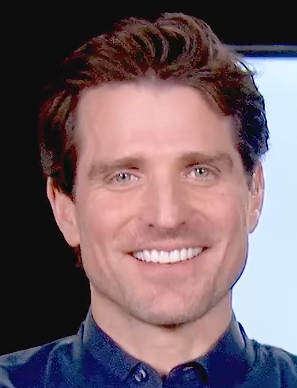
- Sharp in 2020
- Born: December 27, 1981 (age 44) Winnipeg, Manitoba, Canada
- Height: 6 ft 1 in (185 cm)
- Weight: 200 lb (91 kg; 14 st 4 lb)
- Position: Left wing
- Shot: Right
- Played for: Philadelphia Flyers; Chicago Blackhawks; Dallas Stars
- National team: Canada
- NHL draft: 95th overall, 2001; Philadelphia Flyers
- Playing career: 2002–2018

Patrick Sharp (born December 27, 1981) is a Canadian former professional ice hockey player who played 15 seasons in the National Hockey League (NHL) for the Philadelphia Flyers, Chicago Blackhawks, and Dallas Stars. After his retirement as a player, Sharp worked as an analyst for NBC Sports and as a color commentary for Blackhawks broadcasts on NBC Sports Chicago. He joined the Flyers in 2023 as a special adviser to hockey operations. Sharp was also a member of the University of Vermont coaching staff in 2021.

Sharp played collegiate hockey at the University of Vermont before he was drafted by the Flyers in 2001. He began his NHL career with the Flyers organization. During this time, he helped lead the AHL affiliate Philadelphia Phantoms to win the 2005 Calder Cup. He was then traded to the Blackhawks in 2005. He became a three-time Stanley Cup champion with the Blackhawks in 2010, 2013 and 2015. He was later traded to the Stars in 2015, where he spent two seasons before returning to the Blackhawks in 2017. Sharp also represented the Canada at the 2014 Winter Games, where he won an Olympic gold medal.

== Playing career ==
=== Junior and college ===
Sharp began his Junior career at age 16 playing for the Kanata Valley Lasers of the CJHL with his older brother then the next year they both played in Thunder Bay, Ontario, playing for the Thunder Bay Kings program then for the former Thunder Bay Flyers of the United States Hockey League (USHL). From there, he continued his hockey career in the college ranks with the University of Vermont, before the Philadelphia Flyers selected him in the third round, 95th overall, of the 2001 NHL entry draft.

=== Professional ===
==== Philadelphia Flyers ====
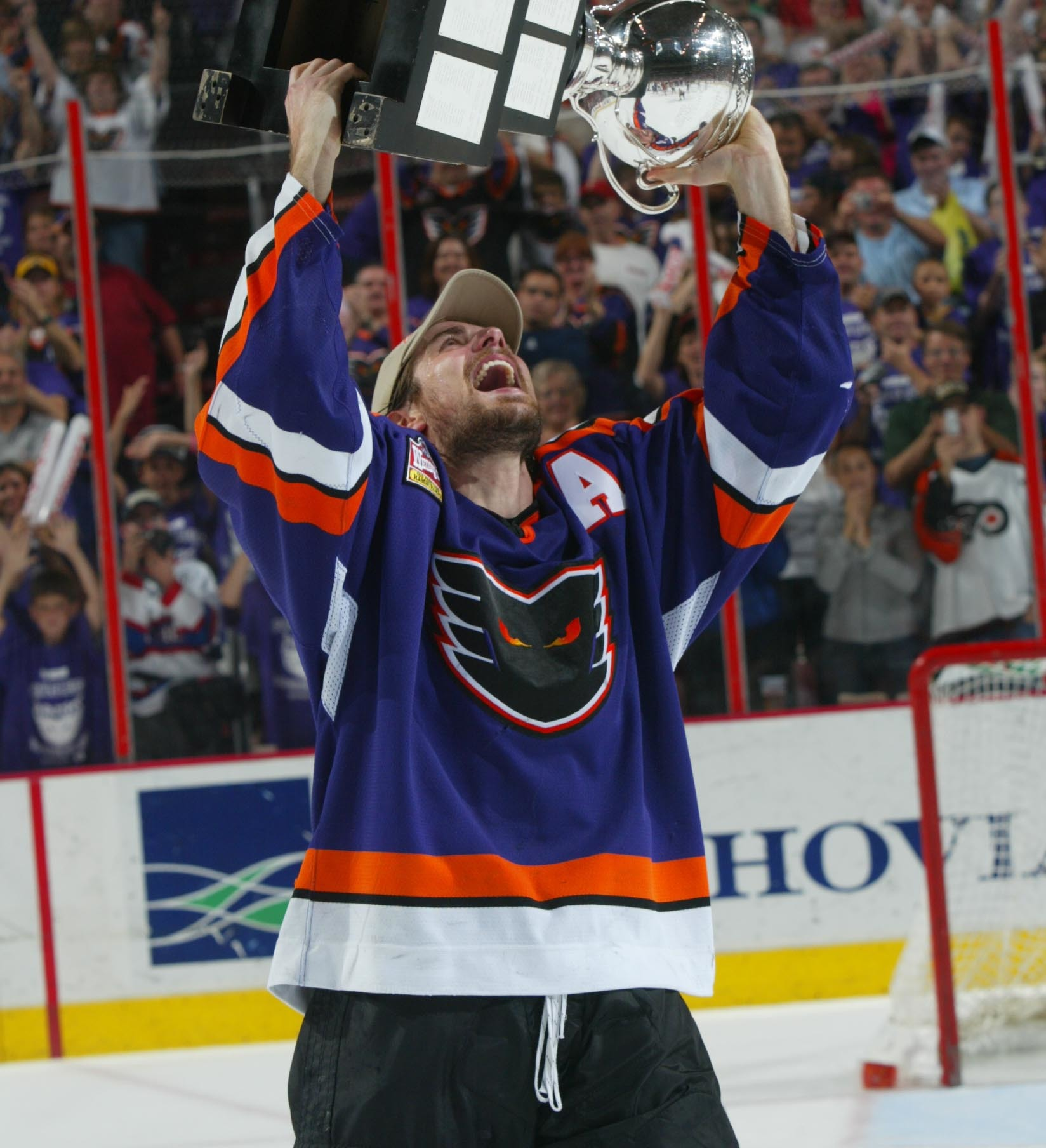
Sharp In June 2005. He won the Calder Cup with the Philadelphia Phantoms during the 2004–05 NHL lockout.

After completing two years with Vermont, Sharp signed a three-year entry-level contract with the Flyers on May 21, 2002. He made his NHL debut in 2002–03, playing in three games with the Flyers but spending most of the season with their American Hockey League (AHL) affiliate, the Philadelphia Phantoms, recording 33 points (14 goals, 19 assists) in 53 games.

In 2003–04, he split the season between the Flyers and Phantoms, recording seven points (five goals, two assists) in 41 games with the Flyers, and 29 points (15 goals, 14 assists) in 35 games for the Phantoms.

Due to the 2004–05 NHL lockout, Sharp spent the entire following season in the AHL with the Phantoms, registering 23 goals and 29 assists (52 points) in 75 regular-season games and eight goals and 13 assists (21 points) in 21 playoff games en route to a Calder Cup championship.

==== Chicago Blackhawks ====
Midway through the 2005–06 season, on December 5, 2005, Sharp was traded by the Flyers (along with Éric Meloche) to the Chicago Blackhawks in exchange for Matt Ellison and a third-round pick in the 2006 NHL entry draft. He finished the season with a combined 31 points between the two teams.

Sharp emerged with the Blackhawks in 2007–08, recording career-highs of 36 goals, 26 assists and 62 points in 80 games. He led the Blackhawks in power play goals (nine), shorthanded goals (seven) and game-winning goals (seven). Near the half-way mark for the season, on January 17, 2008, Sharp signed a new, four-year contract with the Blackhawks lasting through to the end of the 2011–12 season.

At the start of the 2008–09 season, on October 8, 2008, Sharp was named an alternate captain for the Blackhawks, along with Duncan Keith. Despite being limited by injuries, Sharp helped the Blackhawks form a highly offensive and young core led by second-year forwards Patrick Kane, captain Jonathan Toews and newly acquired veteran defenceman Brian Campbell. He finished the season with 44 points (26 goals, 18 assists) in 61 games as the Blackhawks qualified for the playoffs for the first time since 2002. He added 11 points in the 2009 playoffs as the Blackhawks made a surprisingly deep playoff run by defeating the Calgary Flames in six games and Vancouver Canucks in six games in the first two round before they were eliminated in the Western Conference Final in five games by the defending Stanley Cup champion Detroit Red Wings.

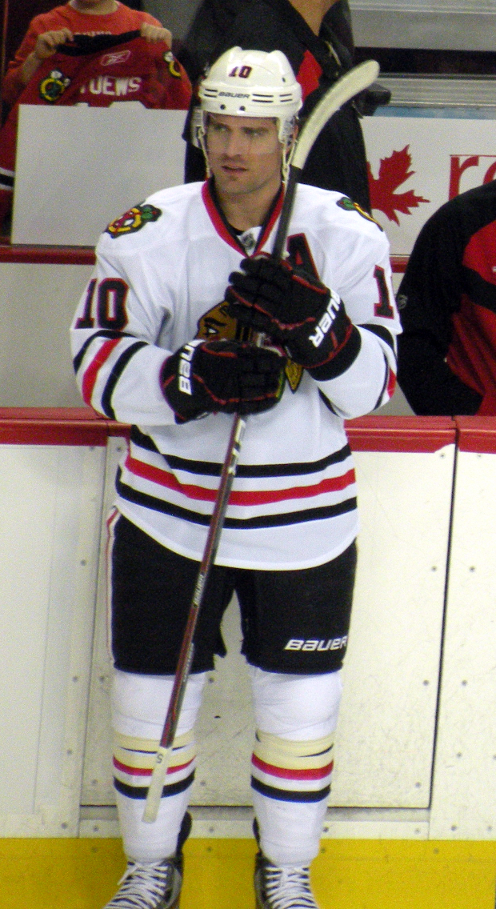
Sharp with the Chicago Blackhawks in February 2012

Sharp played all 82 games for the Blackhawks in the 2009–10 season with 25 goals and 41 assists for 66 points recorded. On June 9, 2010, Sharp won the Stanley Cup with Chicago over the Philadelphia Flyers, his former team. He contributed 11 goals and 11 assists for 22 points in all 22 games during Chicago's 2010 playoff run.

On January 30, 2011, Sharp was named the Most Valuable Player in the 2011 NHL All-Star Game, earning one goal and two assists in the game. On March 20, in a 2–1 win over the Phoenix Coyotes, Sharp collided with Coyotes' defenseman Rostislav Klesla, resulting in him missing the next seven games. Sharp ended the 2010–11 campaign playing in 74 games with a team leading 34 goals along with 37 assists for 71 points recorded. He also had five points (three goals and two assists) in all seven playoff games in the Blackhawks first round exit in the 2011 playoffs to the Presidents' Trophy-winning Vancouver Canucks.

On August 3, 2011, he signed a new five-year contract with Chicago worth $29.5 million, which came into effect for the 2012–13 season and carried an annual salary cap hit of $5.9 million. On September 12, Sharp underwent an emergency appendectomy after experiencing abdominal discomfort. Team physician Dr. Michael Terry anticipated that Sharp would have a full recovery in about three-to-four weeks. On November 25, in a 6–5 win against the Anaheim Ducks, Sharp scored his second career NHL hat-trick. Jonathan Toews, who himself had a career-high five-point game, recorded the primary assists on all three of Sharp's goals. Sharp would finish the season with 33 goals and 36 assists for 69 points in 74 games. His 33 goals led the Blackhawks in goals for the second consecutive season. He scored one goal in all six games during the Blackhawks' first round exit to the Phoenix Coyotes in six games in the 2012 playoffs.

During the 2012–13 NHL lockout, Sharp remained in Chicago, while many of his teammates started playing for the European leagues or with the Rockford IceHogs, the American Hockey League affiliate to the Blackhawks until the end in January 2013. He spent time with his then nine-month-old daughter, and was involved in Gillette's "My City is My Gym" fitness program as a spokesperson. On March 6, 2013, in a 3–2 win over the Colorado Avalanche, Sharp sustained a separated shoulder as a result from a hit by Avalanche defenseman Ryan O'Byrne, resulting in Sharp missing the next 14 games. He ended the 48 game-shortened season, Sharp played 28 games, recording six goals and 14 assists for 20 points and a plus-minus rating of +8. After the Blackhawks won the Presidents' Trophy as the regular season champions, they would go on to win their second Stanley Cup in four seasons as they defeated the Minnesota Wild in five games, the Detroit Red Wings in seven games in round 2 (erasing a 3–1 series deficit in doing so) and the defending Stanley Cup champion Los Angeles Kings in five games in the first three rounds before defeating the Boston Bruins in six games in the 2013 Stanley Cup Final. During the 2013 playoffs, Sharp played in all 23 games and led the Blackhawks in goals (10) followed up with six assists and 16 points.

On December 27, 2013, his 32nd birthday, in a 7–2 win against the Colorado Avalanche, Sharp scored his third career NHL hat-trick. Four games after, in a 5–3 win against the New Jersey Devils on January 3, 2014, he scored his fourth NHL hat-trick. On January 7, 2014, he was named to the Canadian Olympic team for the 2014 Winter Olympics in Sochi. He would end the 2013–14 season with a team-leading 34 goals along with 44 assists for a career high and team-leading 78 points in all 82 games. Sharp and the defending Stanley Cup Champion Blackhawks would go on another deep playoff run in the 2014 playoffs by defeating the St. Louis Blues in the first round in six games and the Minnesota Wild in six games in the second round before going up against the Los Angeles Kings in the Western Conference Final for a second consecutive year and this time losing in seven games to the eventual Stanley Cup champion Kings. He ended the playoffs with five goals and assists for 10 points and played in all 19 games.

On 4 November 2014, in a 5–0 win over the Montreal Canadiens, Sharp took a hit from Canadiens’ defenseman Alexei Emelin, that resulted in both of their legs getting tangled up and a leg injury Sharp, causing him to miss the next 14 games. After playing in 68 games with 16 goals and 27 assists for 43 points in the 2014–15 season, he would win his third Stanley Cup championship with the Blackhawks as they defeated the Nashville Predators in the first round in six games, the Minnesota Wild for the second straight season and a third consecutive playoff matchup, this time defeating them in a sweep, the top-seeded Anaheim Ducks in seven games (erasing a 3–2 series deficit in the process) along with the Tampa Bay Lightning in six games in the 2015 Stanley Cup Final. He scored five goals with 10 assists for 15 points in all 23 games during the 2015 playoffs.

==== Dallas Stars ====
On July 10, 2015, due to salary cap issues, Sharp and Blackhawks defensive prospect Stephen Johns were traded to the Dallas Stars in exchange for defenceman Trevor Daley and forward Ryan Garbutt. On December 22, 2015, in the first matchup against his former Blackhawks, he tallied a two-point performance, adding a goal and an assist in a 4–0 victory. He played in 76 games in the 2015–16 season, recording 20 goals and 35 assists for 55 points as the Stars finished as the top seed in the Western Conference and were the Presidents' Trophy runner-up, 11 points behind the Eastern Conference’s Washington Capitals for the award. In the 2016 playoffs, Sharp and the Stars would defeat the Minnesota Wild in six games in the first round before falling in seven games to the St. Louis Blues in the second round.

The 2016–17 season would be an injury-depleted campaign for both Sharp individually and the Stars as a team. On October 20, 2016, in a 4–3 SO loss to the Los Angeles Kings, Sharp sustained a concussion as he was hit by Kings defenseman Brayden McNabb, causing him to miss the next 14 games. He then missed 12 more games due to another concussion sustained on December 3, in a 3–0 win over the Colorado Avalanche. He finished the season playing in 48 contests with eight goals and 10 assists for 18 points and the Stars as a team missing the playoffs by 15 points.

==== Return to Chicago ====
On July 1, 2017, Sharp signed a one-year contract with the Chicago Blackhawks for the 2017–18 season. Sharp accepted a pay cut, earning a $800,000 base salary with $200,000 in potential bonuses, to return to Chicago. The Blackhawks named Sharp an alternate captain for their final home game of the season against the St. Louis Blues and honored him after the game, which they lost 4–1. Sharp announced his intention to retire after his final game, commenting, "I think I've known what I wanted to do for a long period of time here, and it's never easy... But I think I'm just ready to take that next step in my life — and looking forward to it." He ended his final season with 10 goals and 11 assists for 21 points in 70 games as the Blackhawks failed to qualify for the playoffs for the first time since 2008, coming 19 points behind the last spot.

== Post-retirement ==
In October 2018, Sharp joined NBC Sports Chicago as a studio analyst. Sharp joined NBC Sports as a guest analyst for its coverage of the Stanley Cup Playoffs just 10 days after his retirement. After Sharp's part-time work as a studio analyst for NBC Sports during the 2018-19 NHL season, the network announced on September 25, 2019, it had added Sharp to its team of full-time studio analysts. Sharp later left NBC Sports to join NBC Sports Chicago for Chicago Blackhawks telecasts in 2021, and he later share the role with Troy Murray as the team's TV color commentator, replacing Eddie Olczyk. Sharp worked the 2023 Stanley Cup Playoffs for TNT.

Sharp joined the University of Vermont men's ice hockey coaching staff in the fall of 2021.

In June 2023, Sharp left the NBC Sports Chicago and the University of Vermont coaching staff to join the Philadelphia Flyers' front office as a special adviser to hockey operations.

== Personal life ==
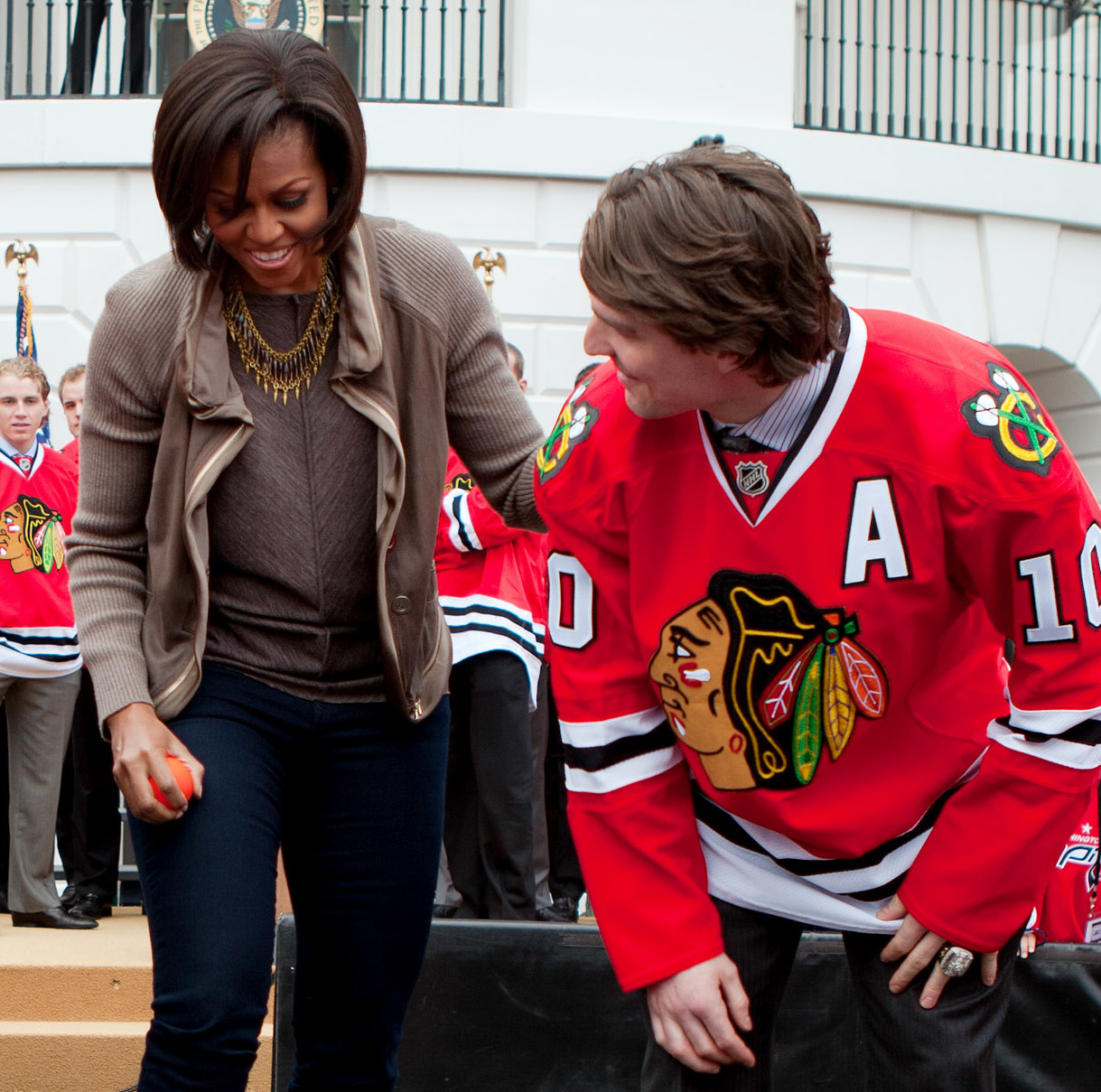
Sharp joins First Lady of the United States Michelle Obama at the White House in March 2011 to promote her Let's Move! initiative.

Sharp was born in Winnipeg, Manitoba, to Ian and Ruth Ann Sharp. He had an older brother, Chris, who lived in Calgary, Alberta who died on August 16, 2023. Relocating several times in his life, Patrick left his native Manitoba and relocated to Calgary as a child and then moved to Thunder Bay in 1990 at age nine. Patrick lived in Thunder Bay for the rest of his childhood. He was educated and attended local public schools in Calgary, Ottawa and Thunder Bay before settling in Burlington, Vermont, in the United States, to attend the University of Vermont. Sharp's parents remain in Thunder Bay and live on Lake Superior. In December 2009, Sharp was inaccurately announced as "Chicago's Sexiest Athlete" by Victoria's Secret, which then named Derrick Rose of the Chicago Bulls the winner, citing an "internal error".

Sharp was married in July 2010 to his longtime girlfriend Abby, whom he met while attending college in Vermont. Their wedding was held in Watch Hill, Rhode Island. Sharp's Blackhawks teammate Patrick Kane was among those in attendance. The couple's first daughter was born in December 2011, and their second daughter was born in October 2013. In March 2011, Sharp was featured on the cover of Chicago magazine in its "50 Most Beautiful Chicagoans" story.

== Career statistics ==
=== Regular season and playoffs ===
Bold indicates led league

			Regular season					Playoffs
Season	Team	League	GP	G	A	Pts	PIM	GP	G	A	Pts	PIM
1997–98	Kanata Valley Lasers	CJHL	54	11	24	35	22	7	0	4	4	0
1998–99	Thunder Bay Flyers	USHL	55	19	24	43	48	3	1	1	2	0
1999–00	Thunder Bay Flyers	USHL	56	20	35	55	41	—	—	—	—	—
2000–01	University of Vermont	ECAC	34	12	15	27	36	—	—	—	—	—
2001–02	University of Vermont	ECAC	31	13	13	26	50	—	—	—	—	—
2002–03	Philadelphia Phantoms	AHL	53	14	19	33	39	—	—	—	—	—
2002–03	Philadelphia Flyers	NHL	3	0	0	0	2	—	—	—	—	—
2003–04	Philadelphia Phantoms	AHL	35	15	14	29	45	1	2	0	2	0
2003–04	Philadelphia Flyers	NHL	41	5	2	7	55	12	1	0	1	2
2004–05	Philadelphia Phantoms	AHL	75	23	29	52	80	21	8	13	21	20
2005–06	Philadelphia Flyers	NHL	22	5	3	8	10	—	—	—	—	—
2005–06	Chicago Blackhawks	NHL	50	9	14	23	36	—	—	—	—	—
2006–07	Chicago Blackhawks	NHL	80	20	15	35	74	—	—	—	—	—
2007–08	Chicago Blackhawks	NHL	80	36	26	62	75	—	—	—	—	—
2008–09	Chicago Blackhawks	NHL	61	26	18	44	41	17	7	4	11	6
2009–10	Chicago Blackhawks	NHL	82	25	41	66	28	22	11	11	22	16
2010–11	Chicago Blackhawks	NHL	74	34	37	71	38	7	3	2	5	2
2011–12	Chicago Blackhawks	NHL	74	33	36	69	38	6	1	0	1	4
2012–13	Chicago Blackhawks	NHL	28	6	14	20	14	23	**10**	6	16	8
2013–14	Chicago Blackhawks	NHL	82	34	44	78	40	19	5	5	10	6
2014–15	Chicago Blackhawks	NHL	68	16	27	43	33	23	5	10	15	8
2015–16	Dallas Stars	NHL	76	20	35	55	27	13	4	2	6	0
2016–17	Dallas Stars	NHL	48	8	10	18	31	—	—	—	—	—
2017–18	Chicago Blackhawks	NHL	70	10	11	21	14	—	—	—	—	—
NHL totals			939	287	333	620	536	142	47	40	87	52

=== International ===
Medal record

Representing Canada

Ice hockey

Olympic Games
Gold medal – first place	2014 Sochi	

World Championships
Silver medal – second place	2008 Canada	

Year	Team	Event	GP	G	A	Pts	PIM
2008	Canada	WC	9	3	0	3	4
2012	Canada	WC	8	1	7	8	2
2014	Canada	OG	5	1	0	1	4
Senior totals			22	5	7	12	10

== Awards and honours ==
Award	Year
College
All-ECAC Rookie Team	2000–01
AHL
Calder Cup Champion	2005
NHL
Stanley Cup Champion	2010, 2013, 2015
NHL All-Star Game	2011
NHL All-Star Game MVP	2011
Olympic Gold Medalist – Canada	2014
