= Jussi Timonen =

Finnish ice hockey player (born 1983)

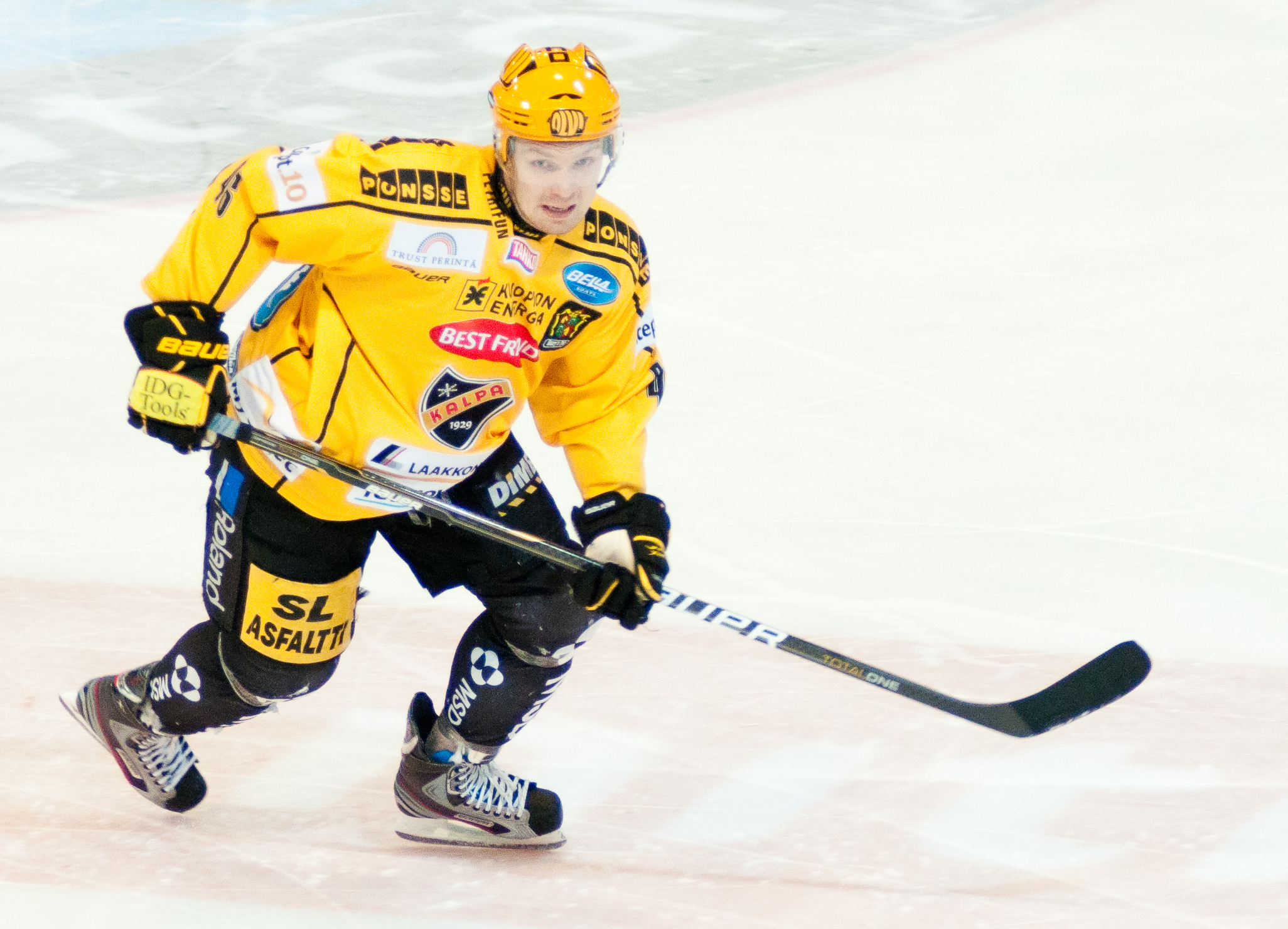
- Born: June 29, 1983 (age 42) Kuopio, Finland
- Height: 5 ft 11 in (180 cm)
- Weight: 200 lb (91 kg; 14 st 4 lb)
- Position: Defence
- Shot: Left
- team Former teams: Free Agent; TPS; SaiPa; Philadelphia Flyers; KalPa; Schwenninger Wild Wings
- NHL draft: 146th overall, 2001; Philadelphia Flyers
- Playing career: 2002–2020

Jussi Timonen (born June 29, 1983) is a Finnish professional ice hockey defenceman who is currently an unrestricted free agent. He most recently played for the Schwenninger Wild Wings of the Deutsche Eishockey Liga (DEL). He is the younger brother of former NHL'er Kimmo Timonen.

== Playing career ==
Timonen began playing hockey at the junior level for KalPa, the team owned by his brother Kimmo Timonen and Sami Kapanen. After two years with the team, he was drafted by the Philadelphia Flyers in the fifth round, 146th overall, of the 2001 NHL entry draft. He has since played for two other SM-liiga teams, TPS and SaiPa.

On May 30, 2006, the Flyers announced that they had signed Timonen to a two-year entry-level contract. "I am very happy because this has been my dream all my life," said Timonen. "I talked to my brother a little bit about the NHL and he gave me some tips, but we will talk more on this later. I think my skating is pretty good. That is my main strength."

Following Flyers training camp, he was sent down to the Philadelphia Phantoms, the AHL affiliate of the Flyers. He was called up and made his NHL debut on November 20 against the Pittsburgh Penguins.

On December 10, 2007, Timonen was traded to the Dallas Stars in return for a conditional draft pick, where he was placed with the team's AHL affiliate, the Iowa Stars. Following the season, Timonen returned to Finland to play for KalPa. On December 12, 2012, Timonen was signed to a four-year contract extension to remain with KalPa.

After playing nine seasons with KalPa, captaining the club for two years, Timonen left as a free agent following the 2016–17 season. He agreed to continue his career in Germany, signing an initial one-year contract with the Schwenninger Wild Wings of the DEL on May 7, 2017.

Timonen played two seasons with the Wild Wings, before leaving the club after the 2018–19 season.

== Career statistics ==
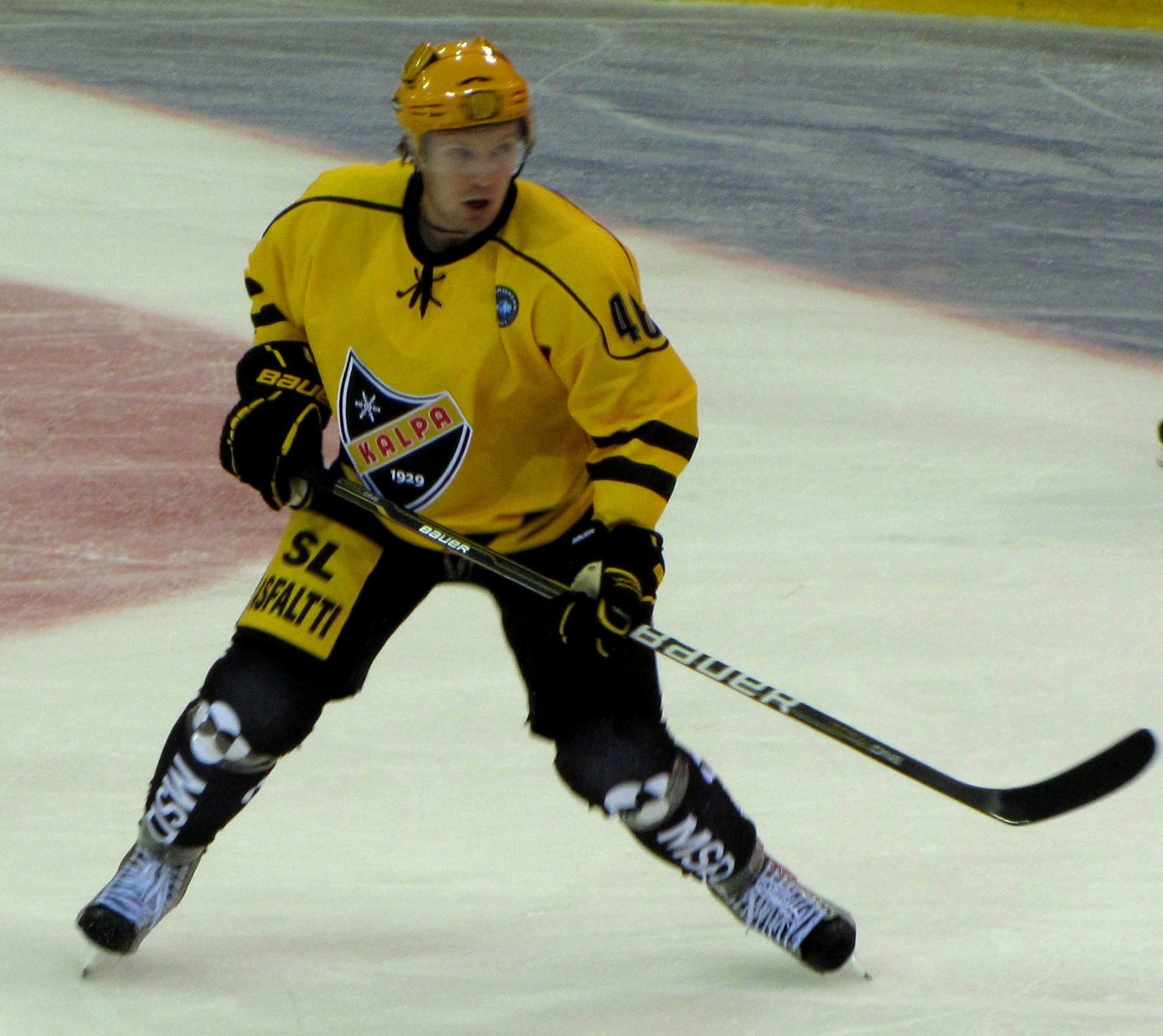

=== Regular season and playoffs ===
			Regular season					Playoffs
Season	Team	League	GP	G	A	Pts	PIM	GP	G	A	Pts	PIM
1999–2000	KalPa	FIN U18	14	3	4	7	31	—	—	—	—	—
1999–2000	KalPa	FIN U20	19	1	0	1	6	4	0	0	0	4
2000–01	KalPa	FIN U18	4	1	4	5	10	—	—	—	—	—
2000–01	KalPa	FIN U20	38	6	7	13	22	—	—	—	—	—
2000–01	KalPa	FIN.3	1	0	1	1	0	8	1	0	1	2
2001–02	KalPa	FIN U20	10	1	1	2	10	—	—	—	—	—
2001–02	KalPa	Mestis	41	3	8	11	10	8	0	2	2	0
2002–03	TPS	FIN U20	2	0	0	0	0	—	—	—	—	—
2002–03	TPS	SM-l	39	1	0	1	10	7	0	2	2	4
2002–03	TUTO Hockey	Mestis	3	0	0	0	0	—	—	—	—	—
2003–04	TPS	SM-l	20	0	0	0	4	—	—	—	—	—
2003–04	Jukurit	Mestis	25	7	9	16	10	13	0	4	4	0
2004–05	SaiPa	SM-l	54	1	5	6	53	—	—	—	—	—
2005–06	SaiPa	SM-l	52	0	7	7	30	8	1	0	1	27
2006–07	Philadelphia Phantoms	AHL	46	2	15	17	18	—	—	—	—	—
2006–07	Philadelphia Flyers	NHL	14	0	4	4	6	—	—	—	—	—
2007–08	Philadelphia Phantoms	AHL	14	0	7	7	14	—	—	—	—	—
2007–08	Iowa Stars	AHL	33	0	11	11	12	—	—	—	—	—
2008–09	KalPa	SM-l	24	0	3	3	14	11	0	1	1	8
2009–10	KalPa	SM-l	56	2	7	9	34	10	1	1	2	14
2010–11	KalPa	SM-l	30	1	1	2	24	—	—	—	—	—
2011–12	KalPa	SM-l	50	2	10	12	40	6	0	1	1	0
2012–13	KalPa	SM-l	57	1	19	20	34	5	0	0	0	2
2013–14	KalPa	Liiga	39	2	4	6	42	—	—	—	—	—
2014–15	KalPa	Liiga	44	2	5	7	26	—	—	—	—	—
2015–16	KalPa	Liiga	48	2	8	10	24	3	0	0	0	2
2016–17	KalPa	Liiga	55	3	11	14	28	18	0	4	4	8
2017–18	Schwenninger Wild Wings	DEL	40	3	13	16	18	2	0	1	1	2
2018–19	Schwenninger Wild Wings	DEL	44	1	6	7	32	—	—	—	—	—
2019–20	KalPa	Liiga	50	0	5	5	36	—	—	—	—	—
Liiga totals			618	17	85	102	399	68	2	9	11	65
NHL totals			14	0	4	4	6	—	—	—	—	—

=== International ===
Year	Team	Event	Result	GP	G	A	Pts	PIM
2000	Finland	WHC17	9th	3	0	0	0	2
2001	Finland	WJC18	3rd place, bronze medalist(s)	6	0	2	2	2
2003	Finland	WJC	3rd place, bronze medalist(s)	7	1	1	2	6
Junior totals				16	1	3	4	10
