= Riley Cote =

Canadian ice hockey player and coach

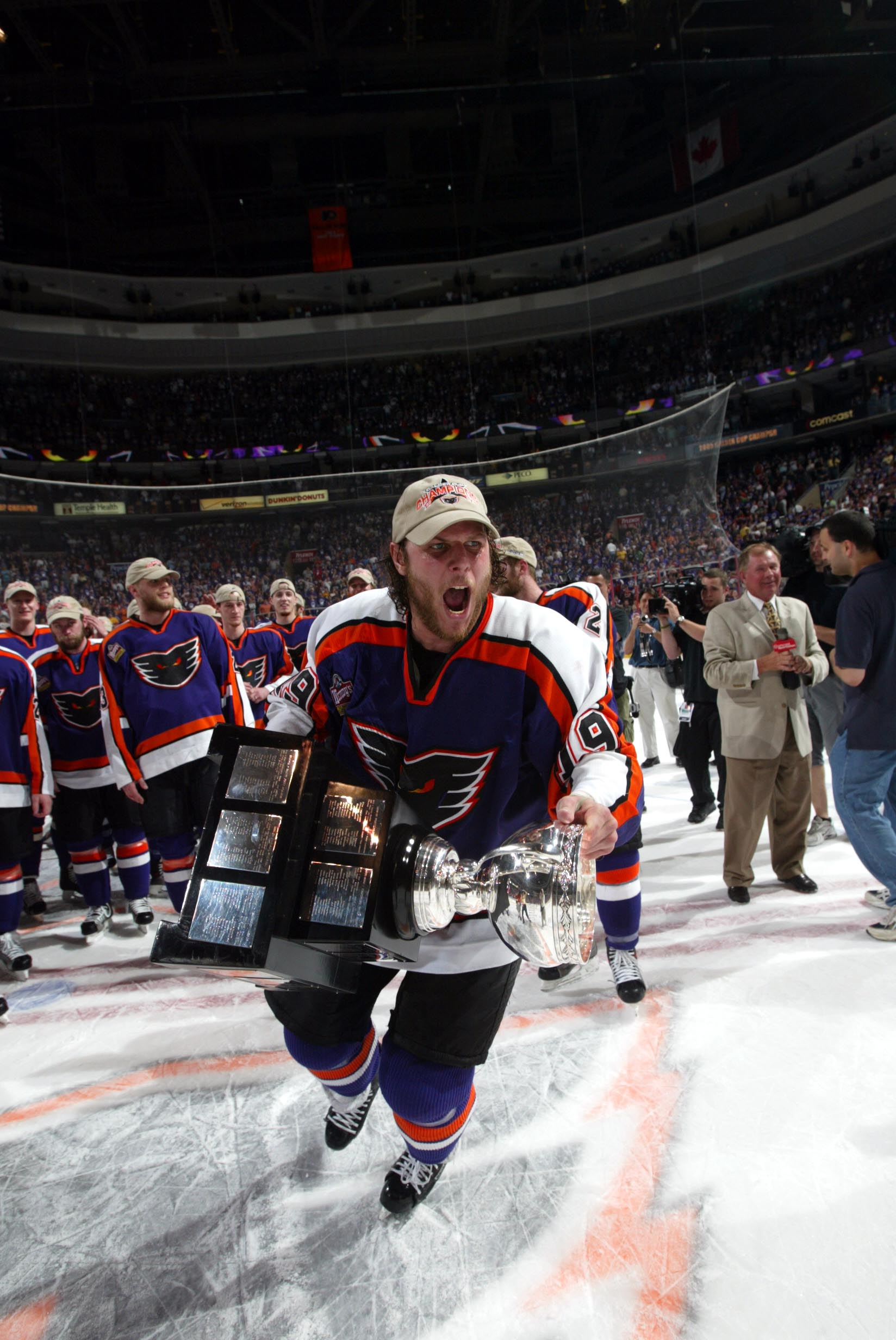
- Cote with the Calder Cup in 2005.
- Born: March 16, 1982 (age 44) Winnipeg, Manitoba, Canada
- Height: 6 ft 2 in (188 cm)
- Weight: 220 lb (100 kg; 15 st 10 lb)
- Position: Left wing
- Shot: Left
- Played for: Philadelphia Flyers (NHL) Philadelphia Phantoms (AHL)
- NHL draft: Undrafted
- Playing career: 2002–2010

Riley Cote (born March 16, 1982) is a former Canadian professional ice hockey left winger and formerly an assistant coach with the Lehigh Valley Phantoms of the American Hockey League (AHL). He played four National Hockey League (NHL) seasons with the Philadelphia Flyers and was mainly known as an enforcer. He also won the 2005 Calder Cup with the Philadelphia Phantoms. He currently co-hosts the Nasty Knuckles podcast.

== Career ==
=== Playing career ===
Undrafted after completing juniors, Cote was a walk-on to the Toronto Maple Leafs training camp in the fall of 2002. He impressed the Leafs' staff, signed a one-year contract, and was assigned to the Leafs Central Hockey League affiliate, the Memphis RiverKings. While called up to the St. John's Maple Leafs, Toronto's American Hockey League affiliate, a few times during the 2002–03 season, he spent most of his rookie year with the RiverKings and was with them when they won the CHL championship that season.

Not re-signed by the Leafs, Cote was signed to a two-way contract by the Syracuse Crunch of the AHL and entered the training camp for their NHL affiliate, the Columbus Blue Jackets, in fall 2003. Columbus released him and he returned to the Crunch. An eye injury caused during a pre-season scrimmage resulted in Cote being assigned to the Crunch's ECHL affiliate, the Dayton Bombers, for much of the 2003–04 season. Cote was recruited back to the RiverKings for the 2004–05 season but was offered a try-out contract by the AHL's Philadelphia Phantoms just before the season began. The Phantoms extended his contract twice through the season and Cote eventually spent the entire season with Philadelphia, accumulating a team-leading 280 penalty minutes in the process, and helped the Phantoms win the Calder Cup as league champions. Shortly after the season ended, the Phantoms signed him to a one-year contract.

After participating in the Philadelphia Flyers training camps in the fall of 2005 and 2006, Cote was signed to a two-way contract by the Flyers in 2006–07. Early in the season, he was assigned to the Phantoms and shortly after suffered an ankle injury that kept him from playing for two months. Late in the season, Cote played in his first 8 NHL games with the Flyers, making his NHL debut on March 24, 2007, against the New York Islanders. Cote was recognized for his contributions to the community when the Phantoms named him as the team's 2006–07 Man of the Year. Cote was re-signed by the Flyers to a one-year contract for the 2007–08 season and made the team out of training camp.

Cote was suspended for three games after he delivered a high headshot to Dallas Stars defenceman Matt Niskanen late in the third period on December 1, 2007. He became the fifth Flyers player to receive a suspension during the 2007–08 season after Steve Downie, Jesse Boulerice, Randy Jones and Scott Hartnell.

Cote scored his only NHL goal on February 17, 2008, against rookie goaltender Carey Price of the Montreal Canadiens. On July 2, 2008, the Flyers announced they had signed Cote to a three-year contract extension.

After appearing in only 15 games during the 2009–10 season, Cote retired on August 9, 2010, and was named an assistant coach of the Adirondack Phantoms.

Cote played a game for the Danbury Hat Tricks of the Federal Prospects Hockey League on November 28, 2021.

=== Coaching ===
Cote was an assistant coach for the Lehigh Valley Phantoms from 2010 to 2017. The Phantoms play in the American Hockey League and serve as the top-level minor league affiliate of the Philadelphia Flyers.

=== Broadcasting ===
Cote currently co-hosts the Nasty Knuckles podcast along with former Flyers' head equipment manager Derek "Nasty" Settlemyre.

== Cannabis and hemp advocacy ==
During his time in the NHL, Cote used cannabis as a natural pain reliever and alternative to addictive pharmaceutical drugs. After retiring, Cote co-founded Athletes for Care, a group that advocates for athletes on issues of health and safety including the use of cannabis as medicine.

Cote is also an advocate for hemp, founding the Hemp Heals Foundation to educate the public about the nutritional benefits of hemp and its numerous eco-friendly industrial uses. The organization hosts an annual music festival in Philadelphia to raise awareness about the various benefits and applications of the hemp plant. Cote is also a board member of the Pennsylvania Hemp Industry Council.

Cote is co-founder of a company called Bodychek Wellness, which produces organically grown CBD extracts and functional mushroom blends intended as alternatives to traditional pain medications.

== Personal life ==
Cote has two daughters with his ex-wife Ashley, named Kinsley and Kaia. He became an advocate for multiple sclerosis diagnosis and treatment after his older sister, Jamie, was diagnosed with the disease in 2000. His nickname is Riles.

Aside from hockey, Cote has also been involved in real estate, creative production, and mindfulness coaching.

== Awards ==
- 2002–03: Ray Miron President's Cup Memphis RiverKings
- 2004–05: Calder Cup Philadelphia Phantoms
- 2006–07: Man of the Year, Philadelphia Phantoms
- 2007–08: Pelle Lindbergh Memorial, Philadelphia Flyers

== Career statistics ==
			Regular season					Playoffs
Season	Team	League	GP	G	A	Pts	PIM	GP	G	A	Pts	PIM
1998–99	Prince Albert Raiders	WHL	37	3	2	5	63	9	0	0	0	9
1999–00	Prince Albert Raiders	WHL	67	6	7	13	71	3	1	0	1	2
2000–01	Prince Albert Raiders	WHL	64	17	35	52	114	—	—	—	—	—
2001–02	Prince Albert Raiders	WHL	67	28	23	51	134	—	—	—	—	—
2002–03	St. John's Maple Leafs	AHL	6	0	0	0	5	—	—	—	—	—
2002–03	Memphis RiverKings	CHL	51	8	6	14	241	14	1	0	1	54
2003–04	Dayton Bombers	ECHL	57	6	11	17	258	—	—	—	—	—
2003–04	Syracuse Crunch	AHL	9	0	0	0	19	—	—	—	—	—
2004–05	Philadelphia Phantoms	AHL	61	4	7	11	280	13	0	0	0	6
2005–06	Philadelphia Phantoms	AHL	70	3	1	4	259	—	—	—	—	—
2006–07	Philadelphia Flyers	NHL	8	0	0	0	16	—	—	—	—	—
2006–07	Philadelphia Phantoms	AHL	37	1	4	5	125	—	—	—	—	—
2007–08	Philadelphia Flyers	NHL	70	1	3	4	202	3	0	0	0	0
2008–09	Philadelphia Flyers	NHL	63	0	3	3	174	—	—	—	—	—
2009–10	Philadelphia Flyers	NHL	15	0	0	0	24	—	—	—	—	—
2021–22	Danbury Hat Tricks	FPHL	1	0	0	0	0	_	_	_	_	_
NHL totals			156	1	6	7	411	3	0	0	0	0
AHL totals			183	8	12	20	688	13	0	0	0	6
WHL totals			235	54	67	121	382	12	1	0	1	11
