= Václav Pletka =

Czech ice hockey player

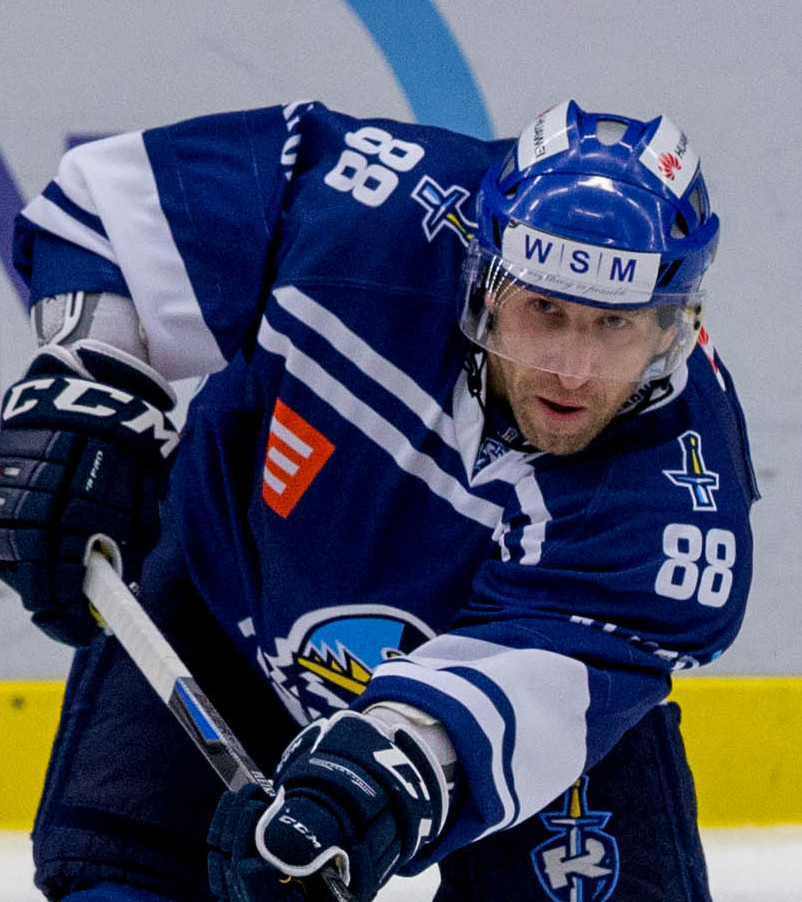
- Václav Pletka in 2015
- Born: June 8, 1979 (age 46) Mladá Boleslav, Czechoslovakia
- Height: 5 ft 11 in (180 cm)
- Weight: 182 lb (83 kg; 13 st 0 lb)
- Position: Left wing
- Shoots: Left
- CZE team Former teams: HC České Budějovice; NHL; Philadelphia Flyers; CZE; HC Liberec; HC Oceláři Třinec
- National team: Czech Republic
- NHL draft: 208th overall, 1999; Philadelphia Flyers
- Playing career: 2002–present

Václav Pletka (born June 8, 1979) is a Czech professional ice hockey player. He plays left wing for HC České Budějovice in the Czech Extraliga. He played in one National Hockey League (NHL) game with the Philadelphia Flyers.

== Playing career ==
He was drafted in the seventh round, 208th overall, of the 1999 NHL entry draft by the Philadelphia Flyers. Pletka played two seasons in the Czech Extraliga for HC Oceláři Třinec before coming to North America. He played in Philadelphia for two seasons, appearing in 132 games with the Philadelphia Phantoms of the American Hockey League, and one NHL game with the Flyers during the 2001–02 NHL season.

For the 2002–03 season, Pletka returned to his native Czech Republic to rejoin HC Oceláři Třinec. In the 2005–06 season, he moved to HC Bílí Tygři Liberec of the Czech Extraliga, and also appeared in five games with HC Dynamo Moscow of the Russian Hockey Super League.

== Career statistics ==
			Regular season					Playoffs
Season	Team	League	GP	G	A	Pts	PIM	GP	G	A	Pts	PIM
1998–99	HC Trinec	Czech	50	15	11	26	20	10	2	1	3	4
1999–00	HC Trinec	Czech	51	28	21	49	72	4	2	2	4	2
2000–01	Philadelphia Phantoms	AHL	71	20	21	41	51	10	1	3	4	4
2001–02	Philadelphia Flyers	NHL	1	0	0	0	0	—	—	—	—	—
2001–02	Philadelphia Phantoms	AHL	61	20	19	39	43	—	—	—	—	—
2002–03	HC Trinec	Czech	47	20	24	44	58	12	3	2	5	18
2003–04	HC Trinec	Czech	47	12	17	29	104	5	0	0	0	2
2004–05	HC Trinec	Czech	16	2	2	4	14	—	—	—	—	—
2004–05	HC Ceske Budejovice	Czech2	12	12	6	18	10	8	1	3	4	6
2005–06	HC Trinec	Czech	22	9	5	14	34	—	—	—	—	—
2005–06	Dynamo Moskva	Russia	5	0	0	0	2	—	—	—	—	—
2005–06	Bili Tygri Liberec	Czech	7	3	0	3	8	5	0	0	0	0
2006–07	Bili Tygri Liberec	Czech	47	20	8	28	56	10	4	3	7	16
2007–08	Bili Tygri Liberec	Czech	26	9	9	18	38	11	5	2	7	18
2008–09	Bili Tygri Liberec	Czech	46	17	18	35	26	3	0	1	1	4
2009–10	HC Karlovy Vary	Czech	38	12	12	24	44	—	—	—	—	—
2009–10	HC Ceske Budejovice	Czech	12	3	2	5	8	5	2	1	3	8
2010–11	HC Ceske Budejovice	Czech	50	8	16	24	40	6	0	1	1	8
2011–12	HC Ceske Budejovice	Czech	3	1	0	1	2	—	—	—	—	—
2011–12	HC Plzen	Czech	27	16	5	21	18	12	5	1	6	16
2012–13	HC Plzen	Czech	49	23	7	30	32	17	3	2	5	18
2013–14	HC Plzen	Czech	50	20	13	33	30	6	1	1	2	4
2014–15	HC Plzen	Czech	38	5	14	19	34	—	—	—	—	—
2014–15	HC Slavia Praha	Czech	10	2	5	7	2	5	1	2	3	4
2015–16	HC Kladno	Czech2	8	1	0	1	8	—	—	—	—	—
2015–16	HC Benatky nad Jizerou	Czech2	24	9	10	19	28	4	1	2	3	2
NHL totals			1	0	0	0	0	—	—	—	—	—
AHL totals			132	40	40	80	94	10	1	3	4	4
Czech totals			636	225	189	414	640	111	28	19	47	122

== See also ==
- List of players who played only one game in the NHL
