= 2006–07 Tampa Bay Lightning season =

National Hockey League team season

2006–07 Tampa Bay Lightning
- Division: 2nd Southeast
- Conference: 7th Eastern
- 2006–07 record: 44–33–5
- Home record: 22–18–1
- Road record: 22–15–4
- Goals for: 253
- Goals against: 261

Team information
- General manager: Jay Feaster
- Coach: John Tortorella
- Captain: Tim Taylor
- Alternate captains: Vincent Lecavalier; Brad Richards
- Arena: St. Pete Times Forum
- Average attendance: 19,833
- Minor league affiliates: Springfield Falcons; Johnstown Chiefs

Team leaders
- Goals: Vincent Lecavalier (52)
- Assists: Martin St. Louis (59)
- Points: Vincent Lecavalier (108)
- Penalty minutes: Andre Roy (128)
- Plus/minus: Nikita Alexeev (+10)
- Wins: Johan Holmqvist (27)
- Goals against average: Johan Holmqvist (2.85)

The 2006–07 Tampa Bay Lightning season was the 15th National Hockey League season in Tampa, Florida. The Lightning hoped to rebound from their disappointing first round exit in 2005–06. After head coach John Tortorella ripped his goaltenders during the 2006 playoffs, the Lightning pinned their hopes on Marc Denis, acquired from the Columbus Blue Jackets during the off-season.

Two Lightning players represented the Eastern Conference at the 55th National Hockey League All-Star Game in Dallas: Martin St. Louis scored a goal in the game, while Vincent Lecavalier recorded an assist.

== Off-season ==
Tim Taylor was named the eighth captain in franchise history on September 6, 2006.

== Regular season ==
=== Season standings ===
Southeast Division
No.	CR		GP	W	L	OTL	GF	GA	Pts
1	3	**Atlanta Thrashers**	82	43	28	11	246	245	97
2	7	**Tampa Bay Lightning**	82	44	33	5	253	261	93
3	11	Carolina Hurricanes	82	40	34	8	241	253	88
4	12	Florida Panthers	82	35	31	16	247	257	86
5	14	Washington Capitals	82	28	40	14	235	286	70

Note: No. = Division rank, CR = Conference rank, W = Wins, L = Losses, T = Ties, GF = Goals For, GA = Goals Against, Pts = Points
Teams that qualified for the playoffs are highlighted in bold.

Eastern Conference
R		Div	GP	W	L	OTL	GF	GA	Pts
**1**	**P -** Buffalo Sabres	**NE**	**82**	**53**	**22**	**7**	**308**	**242**	113
**2**	**Y -** New Jersey Devils	**AT**	**82**	**49**	**24**	**9**	**216**	**201**	107
**3**	**Y -** Atlanta Thrashers	**SE**	**82**	**43**	**28**	**11**	**246**	**245**	97
**4**	**X -** Ottawa Senators	**NE**	**82**	**48**	**25**	**9**	**288**	**222**	105
**5**	**X -** Pittsburgh Penguins	**AT**	**82**	**47**	**24**	**11**	**277**	**246**	105
**6**	**X -** New York Rangers	**AT**	**82**	**42**	**30**	**10**	**242**	**216**	94
**7**	**X -** Tampa Bay Lightning	**SE**	**82**	**44**	**33**	**5**	**253**	**261**	93
**8**	**X -** New York Islanders	**AT**	**82**	**40**	**30**	**12**	**248**	**240**	92
8.5
9	Toronto Maple Leafs	NE	82	40	31	11	258	269	91
10	Montreal Canadiens	NE	82	42	34	6	245	256	90
11	Carolina Hurricanes	SE	82	40	34	8	241	253	88
12	Florida Panthers	SE	82	35	31	16	247	257	86
13	Boston Bruins	NE	82	35	41	6	219	289	76
14	Washington Capitals	SE	82	28	40	14	235	286	70
15	Philadelphia Flyers	AT	82	22	48	12	214	303	56

Divisions: AT – Atlantic, NE – Northeast, SE – Southeast

P – Clinched Presidents Trophy; Y – Clinched division; X – Clinched playoff spot

== Playoffs ==
Tampa Bay ended the 2006–07 regular season as the Eastern Conference's seventh seed.

== Schedule and results ==
=== Regular season ===
2006–07 regular season
October: 5–6–0 (home: 3–4–0; road: 2–2–0)

Game	Date	Visitor	Score	Home	OT	Decision	Attendance	Record	Points	Recap
1	October 5	Tampa Bay	3–2	Atlanta	SO	Denis	17,269	1–0–0	2	W
2	October 7	Boston	3–2	Tampa Bay		Denis	21,234	1–1–0	2	L
3	October 9	Atlanta	1–0	Tampa Bay		Denis	19,817	1–2–0	2	L
4	October 13	Tampa Bay	2–3	Florida		Holmqvist	15,208	1–3–0	2	L
5	October 14	Florida	1–4	Tampa Bay		Denis	19,926	2–3–0	4	W
6	October 16	Carolina	5–1	Tampa Bay		Denis	19,815	2–4–0	4	L
7	October 19	Philadelphia	1–4	Tampa Bay		Denis	19,920	3–4–0	6	W
8	October 21	Tampa Bay	6–4	Washington		Denis	13,327	4–4–0	8	W
9	October 26	Carolina	1–5	Tampa Bay		Denis	18,826	5–4–0	10	W
10	October 28	Tampa Bay	4–6	Carolina		Denis	18,639	5–5–0	10	L
11	October 29	San Jose	4–2	Tampa Bay		Denis	19,904	5–6–0	10	L

November: 8–5–2 (home: 4–3–0; road: 4–2–2)

Game	Date	Visitor	Score	Home	OT	Decision	Attendance	Record	Points	Recap
12	November 1	Toronto	4–2	Tampa Bay		Denis	19,977	5–7–0	10	L
13	November 2	Tampa Bay	5–2	Philadelphia		Holmqvist	18,633	6–7–0	12	W
14	November 4	Tampa Bay	5–6	Boston	OT	Denis	14,169	6–7–1	13	OTL
15	November 6	Tampa Bay	5–1	NY Islanders		Holmqvist	9,693	7–7–1	15	W
16	November 8	Tampa Bay	4–3	Pittsburgh	OT	Holmqvist	14,483	8–7–1	17	W
17	November 11	Atlanta	3–5	Tampa Bay		Holmqvist	20,034	9–7–1	19	W
18	November 15	Montreal	3–1	Tampa Bay		Denis	19,920	9–8–1	19	L
19	November 17	NY Islanders	2–3	Tampa Bay	SO	Holmqvist	19,919	10–8–1	21	W
20	November 19	Tampa Bay	1–4	NY Rangers		Holmqvist	18,200	10–9–1	21	L
21	November 20	Tampa Bay	2–7	Buffalo		Denis	18,690	10–10–1	21	L
22	November 22	Tampa Bay	6–4	Florida		Holmqvist	14,516	11–10–1	23	W
23	November 24	Atlanta	2–3	Tampa Bay	OT	Holmqvist	19,819	12–10–1	25	W
24	November 26	Ottawa	1–3	Tampa Bay		Holmqvist	19,819	13–10–1	27	W
25	November 28	Washington	5–2	Tampa Bay		Holmqvist	18,874	13–11–1	27	L
26	November 30	Tampa Bay	3–4	Boston	SO	Denis	11,150	13–11–2	28	OTL

December: 5–8–0 (home: 3–4–0; road: 2–4–0)

Game	Date	Visitor	Score	Home	OT	Decision	Attendance	Record	Points	Recap
27	December 2	Tampa Bay	2–5	Ottawa		Holmqvist	18,618	13–12–2	28	L
28	December 5	Buffalo	4–1	Tampa Bay		Denis	20,025	13–13–2	28	L
29	December 7	Atlanta	0–8	Tampa Bay		Denis	17,704	14–13–2	30	W
30	December 9	Anaheim	4–3	Tampa Bay		Denis	18,719	14–14–2	30	L
31	December 12	Tampa Bay	4–5	Toronto		Holmqvist	19,462	14–15–2	30	L
32	December 14	Tampa Bay	2–4	Montreal		Denis	21,273	14–16–2	30	L
33	December 16	Carolina	3–2	Tampa Bay		Denis	18,634	14–17–2	30	L
34	December 19	Tampa Bay	5–4	Washington		Denis	10,417	15–17–2	32	W
35	December 21	Tampa Bay	4–2	Ottawa		Denis	18,603	16–17–2	34	W
36	December 23	NY Rangers	3–4	Tampa Bay		Holmqvist	20,122	17–17–2	36	W
37	December 26	Tampa Bay	1–2	Atlanta		Holmqvist	16,356	17–18–2	36	L
38	December 28	Philadelphia	4–3	Tampa Bay		Holmqvist	21,171	17–19–2	36	L
39	December 30	Montreal	1–3	Tampa Bay		Holmqvist	21,120	18–19–2	38	W

January: 9–4–0 (home: 2–2–0; road: 7–2–0)

Game	Date	Visitor	Score	Home	OT	Decision	Attendance	Record	Points	Recap
40	January 2	Tampa Bay	2–5	Montreal		Holmqvist	21,273	18–20–2	38	L
41	January 4	Tampa Bay	3–2	Minnesota		Denis	18,568	19–20–2	40	W
42	January 5	Tampa Bay	2–4	Colorado		Denis	18,007	19–21–2	40	L
43	January 7	Tampa Bay	3–2	Pittsburgh	SO	Holmqvist	17,132	20–21–2	42	W
44	January 9	Pittsburgh	2–3	Tampa Bay		Holmqvist	19,226	21–21–2	44	W
45	January 11	Washington	4–5	Tampa Bay		Holmqvist	18,804	22–21–2	46	W
46	January 13	Tampa Bay	3–2	Buffalo		Denis	18,690	23–21–2	48	W
47	January 15	Tampa Bay	4–3	NY Islanders		Holmqvist	15,426	24–21–2	50	W
48	January 16	Toronto	4–2	Tampa Bay		Denis	19,830	24–22–2	50	L
49	January 18	Tampa Bay	3–2	New Jersey	SO	Holmqvist	12,698	25–22–2	52	W
50	January 20	Tampa Bay	6–5	Carolina	SO	Denis	18,196	26–22–2	54	W
51	January 26	New Jersey	2–0	Tampa Bay		Holmqvist	21,404	26–23–2	54	L
52	January 30	Tampa Bay	4–3	Philadelphia	SO	Holmqvist	19,313	27–23–2	56	W

February: 9–2–2 (home: 6–1–1; road: 3–1–1)

Game	Date	Visitor	Score	Home	OT	Decision	Attendance	Record	Points	Recap
53	February 1	Tampa Bay	4–0	Carolina		Holmqvist	16,635	28–23–2	58	W
54	February 3	NY Rangers	2–3	Tampa Bay		Holmqvist	21,354	29–23–2	60	W
55	February 6	Los Angeles	2–3	Tampa Bay	SO	Holmqvist	18,273	30–23–2	62	W
56	February 9	Tampa Bay	0–5	NY Rangers		Holmqvist	18,200	30–24–2	62	L
57	February 11	Tampa Bay	4–1	New Jersey		Holmqvist	18,022	31–24–2	64	W
58	February 13	Phoenix	3–5	Tampa Bay		Holmqvist	18,019	32–24–2	66	W
59	February 15	Washington	2–3	Tampa Bay	SO	Denis	18,744	33–24–2	68	W
60	February 17	Tampa Bay	4–5	Florida	OT	Holmqvist	17,813	33–24–3	69	OTL
61	February 20	Florida	2–3	Tampa Bay	SO	Denis	19,319	34–24–3	71	W
62	February 22	Tampa Bay	5–4	Atlanta	OT	Denis	16,032	35–24–3	73	W
63	February 23	Boston	6–2	Tampa Bay		Holmqvist	21,201	35–25–3	73	L
64	February 25	Pittsburgh	1–5	Tampa Bay		Holmqvist	21,119	36–25–3	75	W
65	February 27	Dallas	2–1	Tampa Bay	OT	Holmqvist	19,255	36–25–4	76	OTL

March: 7–7–0 (home: 3–3–0; road: 4–4–0)

Game	Date	Visitor	Score	Home	OT	Decision	Attendance	Record	Points	Recap
66	March 1	Tampa Bay	5–4	Washington	SO	Holmqvist	10,462	37–25–4	78	W
67	March 3	Tampa Bay	2–6	Florida		Denis	17,299	37–26–4	78	L
68	March 6	Tampa Bay	1–5	Vancouver		Holmqvist	18,630	37–27–4	78	L
69	March 7	Tampa Bay	3–1	Edmonton		Denis	16,839	38–27–4	80	W
70	March 10	Tampa Bay	3–2	Calgary	OT	Denis	19,289	39–27–4	82	W
71	March 13	Tampa Bay	2–3	Toronto		Denis	19,530	39–28–4	82	L
72	March 16	Buffalo	3–2	Tampa Bay		Denis	21,264	39–29–4	82	L
73	March 18	Tampa Bay	1–7	Washington		Holmqvist	14,274	39–30–4	82	L
74	March 20	NY Islanders	3–4	Tampa Bay	OT	Holmqvist	19,916	40–30–4	84	W
75	March 22	New Jersey	1–3	Tampa Bay		Denis	20,326	41–30–4	86	W
76	March 24	Ottawa	7–2	Tampa Bay		Denis	20,342	41–31–4	86	L
77	March 27	Florida	5–2	Tampa Bay		Denis	18,856	41–32–4	86	L
78	March 30	Tampa Bay	4–2	Carolina		Holmqvist	18,639	42–32–4	88	W
79	March 31	Washington	2–5	Tampa Bay		Holmqvist	20,064	43–32–4	90	W

April: 1–1–1 (home: 0–1–0; road: 1–0–1)

Game	Date	Visitor	Score	Home	OT	Decision	Attendance	Record	Points	Recap
80	April 3	Carolina	2–5	Tampa Bay		Holmqvist	20,224	44–32–4	92	W
81	April 6	Florida	7–2	Tampa Bay		Holmqvist	21,002	44–33–4	92	L
82	April 7	Tampa Bay	2–3	Atlanta	SO	Holmqvist	18,756	44–33–5	93	OTL

Legend: W Win (2 points) L Loss (0 points) OTL Overtime/shootout loss (1 point)

=== Playoffs ===
2007 Stanley Cup playoffs
Eastern Conference Quarterfinals vs. (2) New Jersey Devils – Devils win 4–2

Game	Date	Visitor	Score	Home	OT	Decision	Attendance	Series	Recap
1	April 12	Tampa Bay	3–5	New Jersey		Holmqvist	14,495	0–1	L
2	April 14	Tampa Bay	3–2	New Jersey		Holmqvist	18,231	1–1	W
3	April 16	New Jersey	2–3	Tampa Bay		Holmqvist	20,219	2–1	W
4	April 18	New Jersey	4–3	Tampa Bay	OT	Holmqvist	20,940	2–2	L
5	April 20	Tampa Bay	0–3	New Jersey		Holmqvist	18,096	2–3	L
6	April 22	New Jersey	3–2	Tampa Bay		Holmqvist	20,019	2–4	L

Legend: W Win L Loss

== Player statistics ==
=== Scoring ===
- Position abbreviations: C = Center; D = Defense; G = Goaltender; LW = Left wing; RW = Right wing
- † = Joined team via a transaction (e.g., trade, waivers, signing) during the season. Stats reflect time with the Lightning only.
- ‡ = Left team via a transaction (e.g., trade, waivers, release) during the season. Stats reflect time with the Lightning only.

No.	Player	Pos	Regular season						Playoffs					
No.	Player	Pos	GP	G	A	Pts	+/-	PIM	GP	G	A	Pts	+/-	PIM
4	Vincent Lecavalier	C	82	52	56	108	2	44	6	5	2	7	4	10
26	Martin St. Louis	RW	82	43	59	102	7	28	6	3	5	8	6	8
19	Brad Richards	C	82	25	45	70	−19	23	6	3	5	8	−4	6
22	Dan Boyle	D	82	20	43	63	−5	62	6	0	1	1	0	2
20	Vaclav Prospal	C	82	14	41	55	−24	36	6	1	4	5	2	4
71	Filip Kuba	D	81	15	22	37	−9	36	6	1	4	5	−1	4
9	Eric Perrin	C	82	13	23	36	−7	30	6	1	1	2	−4	2
17	Ruslan Fedotenko	LW	80	12	20	32	−3	52	4	0	0	0	−4	4
54	Paul Ranger	D	72	4	24	28	5	42	6	0	1	1	3	4
34	Ryan Craig	C	72	14	13	27	−11	55	6	0	0	0	−1	12
15	Nikita Alexeev‡	RW	63	10	11	21	10	12	—	—	—	—	—	—
21	Cory Sarich	D	82	0	15	15	−6	70	6	0	0	0	0	2
3	Doug Janik	D	75	2	9	11	−11	53	1	0	0	0	0	0
74	Nick Tarnasky	C	77	5	4	9	−6	80	6	0	0	0	−1	10
24	Andreas Karlsson	C	53	3	6	9	−4	12	6	0	0	0	−1	0
16	Jason Ward†	RW	17	4	4	8	−11	10	6	0	1	1	−6	6
44	Nolan Pratt	D	81	1	7	8	0	44	6	0	0	0	−2	5
29	Dmitry Afanasenkov‡	LW	33	3	3	6	−6	8	—	—	—	—	—	—
27	Tim Taylor	C	71	1	5	6	−5	16	6	0	0	0	0	0
49	Blair Jones	C	20	1	2	3	0	2	—	—	—	—	—	—
36	Andre Roy†	RW	51	1	2	3	−3	116	6	0	0	0	0	17
40	Johan Holmqvist	G	48	0	3	3		4	6	0	0	0		0
7	Luke Richardson	D	27	0	3	3	3	16	—	—	—	—	—	—
55	Shane O'Brien†	D	18	0	2	2	−8	36	6	0	0	0	−4	12
30	Marc Denis	G	44	0	0	0		2	—	—	—	—	—	—
31	Karri Ramo	G	2	0	0	0		0	—	—	—	—	—	—
61	Karl Stewart†	LW	7	0	0	0	−2	2	—	—	—	—	—	—
56	Kyle Wanvig†	RW	4	0	0	0	0	0	—	—	—	—	—	—

=== Goaltending ===
No.	Player	Regular season										Playoffs								
No.	Player	GP	W	L	OT	SA	GA	GAA	SV%	SO	TOI	GP	W	L	SA	GA	GAA	SV%	SO	TOI
40	Johan Holmqvist	48	27	15	3	1134	121	2.85	.893	1	2548	6	2	4	168	18	2.92	.893	0	370
30	Marc Denis	44	17	18	2	1068	125	3.19	.883	1	2353	—	—	—	—	—	—	—	—	—
31	Karri Ramo	2	0	0	0	23	4	3.45	.826	0	70	—	—	—	—	—	—	—	—	—

== Awards and records ==
=== Awards ===
Type	Award/honor	Recipient	Ref
League (annual)	Maurice "Rocket" Richard Trophy	Vincent Lecavalier	
League (annual)	NHL Second All-Star Team	Dan Boyle (Defense)	
League (annual)	NHL Second All-Star Team	Vincent Lecavalier (Center)	
League (annual)	NHL Second All-Star Team	Martin St. Louis (Right wing)	
League (in-season)	NHL All-Star Game selection	Vincent Lecavalier	
League (in-season)	NHL All-Star Game selection	Martin St. Louis	
League (in-season)	NHL First Star of the Week	Martin St. Louis (November 26)	
League (in-season)	NHL Second Star of the Week	Vincent Lecavalier (December 10)	
League (in-season)	NHL Third Star of the Month	Vincent Lecavalier (March)	
League (in-season)	NHL Second Star of the Week	Vincent Lecavalier (December 24)	
League (in-season)	NHL Second Star of the Week	Brad Richards (February 25)	
League (in-season)	NHL YoungStars Game selection	Paul Ranger	

=== Records ===
Vincent Lecavalier reached 50 goals in a single season and becomes the highest, single-season goal scorer in Lightning history, surpassing Brian Bradley's previous record of 42 goals in a single season.

=== Milestones ===
Milestone	Player	Date	Ref
First game	Blair Jones	November 20, 2006	
First game	Karri Ramo	December 2, 2006	

== Transactions ==
The Lightning were involved in the following transactions from June 20, 2006, the day after the deciding game of the 2006 Stanley Cup Finals, through June 6, 2007, the day of the deciding game of the 2007 Stanley Cup Finals.

=== Trades ===
Date	Details		Ref
June 30, 2006	To Tampa Bay Lightning: Marc Denis	To Columbus Blue Jackets: Fredrik Modin; Fredrik Norrena	
July 2, 2006	To Tampa Bay Lightning: 4th-round pick in 2008	To Dallas Stars: Darryl Sydor	
November 9, 2006	To Tampa Bay Lightning: Daniel Corso	To Philadelphia Flyers: Darren Reid	
January 20, 2007	To Tampa Bay Lightning: Ryan Munce	To Los Angeles Kings: 4th-round pick in 2008	
February 1, 2007	To Tampa Bay Lightning: Stephen Baby; Kyle Wanvig	To Atlanta Thrashers: Andy Delmore; Andre Deveaux	
February 24, 2007	To Tampa Bay Lightning: Shane O'Brien; 3rd-round pick in 2007	To Anaheim Ducks: Gerald Coleman; 1st-round pick in 2007	
February 27, 2007	To Tampa Bay Lightning: Karl Stewart; 6th-round pick in 2007	To Chicago Blackhawks: Nikita Alexeev	
February 27, 2007	To Tampa Bay Lightning: Jason Ward	To Los Angeles Kings: 5th-round pick in 2007	
February 27, 2007	To Tampa Bay Lightning: Joe Rullier	To Anaheim Ducks: Doug O'Brien	

=== Players acquired ===
Date	Player	Former team	Term	Via	Ref
July 1, 2006	Andy Delmore	Columbus Blue Jackets	1-year	Free agency	
July 1, 2006	Andreas Karlsson	HV71 (SHL)	1-year	Free agency	
July 2, 2006	Filip Kuba	Minnesota Wild	3-year	Free agency	
July 6, 2006	Doug Janik	Buffalo Sabres		Free agency	
July 11, 2006	Luke Richardson	Toronto Maple Leafs	1-year	Free agency	
July 15, 2006	Eric Healey	Boston Bruins	2-year	Free agency	
December 2, 2006	Andre Roy	Pittsburgh Penguins		Waivers	

=== Players lost ===
Date	Player	New team	Via (Note: In parentheses is the player's free agency group on July 1 if applicable.)	Ref
July 1, 2006	Gerard Dicaire (Note: Dicaire retired.)		Contract expiration (UFA)	
July 1, 2006	John Grahame	Carolina Hurricanes	Free agency (III)	
July 1, 2006	Pavel Kubina	Toronto Maple Leafs	Free agency (III)	
July 1, 2006	Steve McLaren (Note: McLaren retired.)		Contract expiration (III)	
July 1, 2006	Todd Rohloff (Note: Rohloff retired.)		Contract expiration (III)	
July 17, 2006	Dennis Packard	Boston Bruins	Free agency (UFA)	
July 18, 2006	Jason Jaspers	Adler Mannheim (DEL)	Free agency (VI)	
August 5, 2006	Evgeny Artyukhin	Lokomotiv Yaroslavl (RSL)	Free agency (II) (Note: Tampa Bay retained Artyukhin's NHL rights and re-signed him on July 8, 2008.)	
August 9, 2006	Timo Helbling	Hershey Bears (AHL) (Note: Helbling signed with Hershey on the same day.)	Release (II)	
August 16, 2006	Martin Cibak	Frolunda HC (SHL)	Free agency (UFA)	
August 22, 2006	Zdenek Blatny	Springfield Falcons (AHL)	Free agency (VI)	
October 5, 2006	Jean-Francois Soucy	Elmira Jackals (UHL)	Free agency (UFA)	
November 14, 2006	Chris Dingman	Sodertalje SK (SWE-2)	Free agency (III)	
December 30, 2006	Dmitri Afanasenkov	Philadelphia Flyers	Waivers	
January 18, 2007	Sean Burke	Los Angeles Kings	Waivers	

=== Signings ===
Date	Player	Term	Contract type	Ref
July 1, 2006	Nikita Alexeev	1-year	Re-signing	
July 4, 2006	Marc Denis	3-year	Re-signing	
July 4, 2006	Norm Milley	1-year	Re-signing	
July 6, 2006	Ruslan Fedotenko	1-year	Re-signing	
July 12, 2006	Dmitri Afanasenkov	1-year	Re-signing	
July 14, 2006	Mitch Fritz		Re-signing	
July 14, 2006	Blair Jones	3-year	Entry-level	
July 15, 2006	Ryan Craig	2-year	Re-signing	
July 27, 2006	Cory Sarich	1-year	Re-signing	
April 6, 2007	Vladimir Mihalik	3-year	Entry-level	
May 9, 2007	Jason Ward	2-year	Extension	
May 16, 2007	Andreas Karlsson	1-year	Extension	
May 19, 2007	Johan Holmqvist	1-year	Extension	
May 31, 2007	Riku Helenius	3-year	Entry-level	
May 31, 2007	Chris Lawrence	3-year	Entry-level	

== Draft picks ==
Tampa's picks at the 2006 NHL entry draft in Vancouver, British Columbia. The Lightning picked 15th overall. Through a series of trades, Tampa had only four picks at this draft.

Round	#	Player	Nationality	College/junior/club team (league)
1	15	Riku Helenius (G)	Finland	Ilves (SM-liiga)
3	78	Kevin Quick (D)	United States	Salisbury (USHS-CN)
6	168	Dane Crowley (D)	Canada	Swift Current Broncos (WHL)
7	198	Denis Kazionov (LW)	Russia	HC MVD Tver (Russian Superleague)

== Farm teams ==
=== Springfield Falcons ===
The Falcons are the Lightning's top affiliate in the American Hockey League for the third year.

=== Johnstown Chiefs ===
The Chiefs are Tampa Bay's ECHL affiliate for the 2006–07 season.

== See also ==
- 2006–07 NHL season
