= 2006–07 Carolina Hurricanes season =

National Hockey League team season

2006–07 Carolina Hurricanes
- Division: 3rd Southeast
- Conference: 11th Eastern
- 2006–07 record: 40–34–8
- Home record: 21–16–4
- Road record: 19–18–4
- Goals for: 241
- Goals against: 253

Team information
- General manager: Jim Rutherford
- Coach: Peter Laviolette
- Captain: Rod Brind'Amour
- Alternate captains: Kevyn Adams (Oct.–Jan.); Cory Stillman; Glen Wesley; Ray Whitney (Jan.–Apr.)
- Arena: RBC Center
- Minor league affiliates: Albany River Rats; Florida Everblades

Team leaders
- Goals: Justin Williams (33)
- Assists: Rod Brind'Amour (56)
- Points: Ray Whitney (83)
- Penalty minutes: Mike Commodore (113)
- Plus/minus: Glen Wesley (+11)
- Wins: Cam Ward (30)
- Goals against average: Cam Ward (2.93)

The 2006–07 Carolina Hurricanes season began as the defending Stanley Cup champions started to defend their title. The Hurricanes did not make any substantial changes to their roster, hoping that their lineup would be enough to get them a repeat as NHL champions. However, due to many factors, including a shortened off-season due to last season's Stanley Cup run, injuries and disappointing performances from the team's young stars (including Eric Staal and Cam Ward), the team failed to qualify for the post-season becoming the first team since the 1995–96 New Jersey Devils to miss the playoffs after winning the Stanley Cup the previous year.

== Regular season ==
=== Season standings ===
Southeast Division
No.	CR		GP	W	L	OTL	GF	GA	Pts
1	3	**Atlanta Thrashers**	82	43	28	11	246	245	97
2	7	**Tampa Bay Lightning**	82	44	33	5	253	261	93
3	11	Carolina Hurricanes	82	40	34	8	241	253	88
4	12	Florida Panthers	82	35	31	16	247	257	86
5	14	Washington Capitals	82	28	40	14	235	286	70

Note: No. = Division rank, CR = Conference rank, W = Wins, L = Losses, T = Ties, GF = Goals For, GA = Goals Against, Pts = Points
Teams that qualified for the playoffs are highlighted in bold.

Eastern Conference
R		Div	GP	W	L	OTL	GF	GA	Pts
**1**	**P -** Buffalo Sabres	**NE**	**82**	**53**	**22**	**7**	**308**	**242**	113
**2**	**Y -** New Jersey Devils	**AT**	**82**	**49**	**24**	**9**	**216**	**201**	107
**3**	**Y -** Atlanta Thrashers	**SE**	**82**	**43**	**28**	**11**	**246**	**245**	97
**4**	**X -** Ottawa Senators	**NE**	**82**	**48**	**25**	**9**	**288**	**222**	105
**5**	**X -** Pittsburgh Penguins	**AT**	**82**	**47**	**24**	**11**	**277**	**246**	105
**6**	**X -** New York Rangers	**AT**	**82**	**42**	**30**	**10**	**242**	**216**	94
**7**	**X -** Tampa Bay Lightning	**SE**	**82**	**44**	**33**	**5**	**253**	**261**	93
**8**	**X -** New York Islanders	**AT**	**82**	**40**	**30**	**12**	**248**	**240**	92
8.5
9	Toronto Maple Leafs	NE	82	40	31	11	258	269	91
10	Montreal Canadiens	NE	82	42	34	6	245	256	90
11	Carolina Hurricanes	SE	82	40	34	8	241	253	88
12	Florida Panthers	SE	82	35	31	16	247	257	86
13	Boston Bruins	NE	82	35	41	6	219	289	76
14	Washington Capitals	SE	82	28	40	14	235	286	70
15	Philadelphia Flyers	AT	82	22	48	12	214	303	56

Divisions: AT – Atlantic, NE – Northeast, SE – Southeast

P – Clinched Presidents Trophy; Y – Clinched division; X – Clinched playoff spot

== Schedule and results ==
2006–07 regular season
October: 5–5–2 (home: 2–1–1; road: 3–4–1)

Game	Date	Visitor	Score	Home	OT	Decision	Attendance	Record	Points	Recap
1	October 4	Buffalo	3 – 2	Carolina	SO	Ward	18,840	0–0–1	1	OTL
2	October 6	New Jersey	4 – 0	Carolina		Ward	18,639	0–1–1	1	L
3	October 7	Carolina	2 – 5	Washington		Ward	16,622	0–2–1	1	L
4	October 11	Carolina	3 – 6	Florida		Grahame	14,312	0–3–1	1	L
5	October 13	Carolina	4 – 3	Atlanta		Ward	13,106	1–3–1	3	W
6	October 14	Carolina	5 – 1	Pittsburgh		Ward	14,351	2–3–1	5	W
7	October 16	Carolina	5 – 1	Tampa Bay		Ward	19,815	3–3–1	7	W
8	October 20	Carolina	4 – 5	Buffalo		Ward	18,690	3–4–1	7	L
9	October 21	Carolina	3 – 4	NY Islanders	OT	Grahame	12,349	3–4–2	8	OTL
10	October 25	Atlanta	4 – 5	Carolina	OT	Ward	15,008	4–4–2	10	W
11	October 26	Carolina	1 – 5	Tampa Bay		Ward	19,826	4–5–2	10	L
12	October 28	Tampa Bay	4 – 6	Carolina		Ward	18,639	5–5–2	12	W

November: 9–5–1 (home: 5–2–0; road: 4–3–1)

Game	Date	Visitor	Score	Home	OT	Decision	Attendance	Record	Points	Recap
13	November 1	Carolina	5 – 2	Atlanta		Ward	14,277	6–5–2	14	W
14	November 2	Montreal	4 – 0	Carolina		Ward	16,486	6–6–2	14	L
15	November 4	Carolina	3 – 2	Ottawa		Ward	19,548	7–6–2	16	W
16	November 7	Carolina	2 – 3	New Jersey	SO	Ward	10,986	7–6–3	17	OTL
17	November 9	Washington	0 – 5	Carolina		Ward	18,639	8–6–3	19	W
18	November 11	Pittsburgh	2 – 6	Carolina		Ward	18,726	9–6–3	21	W
19	November 13	Buffalo	7 – 4	Carolina		Ward	14,387	9–7–3	21	L
20	November 15	NY Rangers	1 – 2	Carolina		Ward	16,080	10–7–3	23	W
21	November 17	Carolina	4 – 1	Washington		Grahame	12,683	11–7–3	25	W
22	November 18	Dallas	4 – 5	Carolina		Ward	18,639	12–7–3	27	W
23	November 21	Carolina	0 – 4	NY Rangers		Ward	18,200	12–8–3	27	L
24	November 22	Carolina	2 – 4	NY Islanders		Grahame	12,419	12–9–3	27	L
25	November 24	Carolina	5 – 1	Boston		Grahame	16,544	13–9–3	29	W
26	November 28	Ottawa	4 – 1	Carolina		Grahame	14,393	13–10–3	29	L
27	November 30	Montreal	2 – 4	Carolina		Ward	13,103	14–10–3	31	W

December: 7–6–1 (home: 4–2–0; road: 3–4–1)

Game	Date	Visitor	Score	Home	OT	Decision	Attendance	Record	Points	Recap
28	December 2	Boston	2 – 5	Carolina		Ward	18,639	15–10–3	33	W
29	December 5	Carolina	0 – 3	Calgary		Grahame	19,289	15–11–3	33	L
30	December 6	Carolina	1 – 3	Edmonton		Ward	16,839	15–12–3	33	L
31	December 8	Carolina	3 – 4	Vancouver	OT	Ward	18,630	15–12–4	34	OTL
32	December 11	Carolina	2 – 5	Colorado		Grahame	17,214	15–13–4	34	L
33	December 15	Toronto	5 – 3	Carolina		Ward	18,639	15–14–4	34	L
34	December 16	Carolina	3 – 2	Tampa Bay		Ward	18,634	16–14–4	36	W
35	December 19	Carolina	2 – 1	Philadelphia		Ward	19,111	17–14–4	38	W
36	December 22	NY Islanders	1 – 5	Carolina		Ward	18,252	18–14–4	40	W
37	December 23	Carolina	3 – 2	Florida	OT	Grahame	16,147	19–14–4	42	W
38	December 26	Florida	2 – 4	Carolina		Ward	18,639	20–14–4	44	W
39	December 28	Carolina	1 – 4	Buffalo		Grahame	18,690	20–15–4	44	L
40	December 29	Anaheim	2 – 4	Carolina		Ward	18,790	21–15–4	46	W
41	December 31	Philadelphia	5 – 2	Carolina		Ward	18,796	21–16–4	46	L

January: 5–5–2 (home: 3–3–2; road: 2–2–0)

Game	Date	Visitor	Score	Home	OT	Decision	Attendance	Record	Points	Recap
42	January 2	Carolina	0 – 3	Pittsburgh		Ward	16,957	21–17–4	46	L
43	January 4	Phoenix	2 – 0	Carolina		Ward	15,096	21–18–4	46	L
44	January 6	NY Islanders	2 – 4	Carolina		Ward	18,639	22–18–4	48	W
45	January 9	Carolina	4 – 1	Toronto		Ward	19,447	23–18–4	50	W
46	January 11	Florida	4 – 6	Carolina		Grahame	13,552	24–18–4	52	W
47	January 13	Atlanta	4 – 3	Carolina	SO	Ward	18,639	24–18–5	53	OTL
48	January 16	Carolina	3 – 2	Florida	OT	Grahame	10,317	25–18–5	55	W
49	January 18	Washington	5 – 2	Carolina		Grahame	16,285	25–19–5	55	L
50	January 20	Tampa Bay	6 – 5	Carolina	SO	Ward	18,196	25–19–6	56	OTL
51	January 26	Washington	2 – 6	Carolina		Ward	18,044	26–19–6	58	W
52	January 27	Carolina	3 – 7	Washington		Ward	16,924	26–20–6	58	L
53	January 30	Toronto	4 – 1	Carolina		Ward	16,533	26–21–6	58	L

February: 6–6–1 (home: 2–4–1; road: 4–2–0)

Game	Date	Visitor	Score	Home	OT	Decision	Attendance	Record	Points	Recap
54	February 1	Tampa Bay	4 – 0	Carolina		Grahame	16,635	26–22–6	58	L
55	February 3	Boston	4 – 3	Carolina	OT	Ward	18,665	26–22–7	59	OTL
56	February 6	Carolina	2 – 1	Montreal		Ward	21,273	27–22–7	61	W
57	February 8	Carolina	5 – 2	Boston		Ward	13,014	28–22–7	63	W
58	February 10	Carolina	4 – 5	Minnesota		Grahame	18,568	28–23–7	63	L
59	February 13	Los Angeles	1 – 2	Carolina		Ward	15,765	29–23–7	65	W
60	February 15	NY Rangers	4 – 1	Carolina		Ward	17,255	29–24–7	65	L
61	February 17	Carolina	5 – 3	Montreal		Ward	21,273	30–24–7	67	W
62	February 20	Atlanta	3 – 1	Carolina		Ward	16,228	30–25–7	67	L
63	February 22	Philadelphia	2 – 3	Carolina	OT	Grahame	14,533	31–25–7	69	W
64	February 24	Carolina	4 – 1	Atlanta		Grahame	18,744	32–25–7	71	W
65	February 27	Ottawa	4 – 2	Carolina		Grahame	17,812	32–26–7	71	L
66	February 28	Carolina	0 – 2	Ottawa		Ward	19,261	32–27–7	71	L

March: 6–5–1 (home: 4–2–0; road: 2–3–1)

Game	Date	Visitor	Score	Home	OT	Decision	Attendance	Record	Points	Recap
67	March 2	Pittsburgh	2 – 3	Carolina		Ward	18,793	33–27–7	73	W
68	March 4	Carolina	1 – 3	Atlanta		Grahame	17,783	33–28–7	73	L
69	March 9	Carolina	3 – 0	Washington		Ward	13,970	34–28–7	75	W
70	March 11	Carolina	1 – 2	NY Rangers	SO	Grahame	18,200	34–28–8	76	OTL
71	March 13	Florida	1 – 3	Carolina		Grahame	18,639	35–28–8	78	W
72	March 15	New Jersey	3 – 2	Carolina		Grahame	18,279	35–29–8	78	L
73	March 17	Carolina	7 – 2	New Jersey		Grahame	15,490	36–29–8	80	W
74	March 22	Washington	3 – 4	Carolina		Ward	18,740	37–29–8	82	W
75	March 24	San Jose	4 – 6	Carolina		Ward	18,763	38–29–8	84	W
76	March 27	Carolina	1 – 6	Toronto		Ward	19,559	38–30–8	84	L
77	March 28	Carolina	1 – 5	Philadelphia		Grahame	19,123	38–31–8	84	L
78	March 30	Tampa Bay	4 – 2	Carolina		Ward	18,639	38–32–8	84	L

April: 2–2–0 (home: 1–1–0; road: 1–1–0)

Game	Date	Visitor	Score	Home	OT	Decision	Attendance	Record	Points	Recap
79	April 1	Carolina	4 – 3	Florida	OT	Ward	17,878	39–32–8	86	W
80	April 3	Carolina	2 – 3	Tampa Bay		Ward	20,224	39–33–8	86	L
81	April 6	Atlanta	4 – 3	Carolina		Ward	17,158	39–34–8	86	L
82	April 7	Florida	4 – 5	Carolina	OT	Grahame	18,639	40–34–8	88	W

Legend: W Win (2 points) L Loss (0 points) OTL Overtime/shootout loss (1 point)

== Player statistics ==
- Position abbreviations: C = Center; D = Defense; G = Goaltender; LW = Left wing; RW = Right wing
- † = Joined team via a transaction (e.g., trade, waivers, signing) during the season. Stats reflect time with the Hurricanes only.
- ‡ = Left team via a transaction (e.g., trade, waivers, release) during the season. Stats reflect time with the Hurricanes only.

No.	Player	Pos	Regular season					
No.	Player	Pos	GP	G	A	Pts	+/-	PIM
13	Ray Whitney	LW	81	32	51	83	−5	46
17	Rod Brind'Amour	C	78	26	56	82	7	46
12	Eric Staal	C	82	30	40	70	−6	68
11	Justin Williams	RW	82	33	34	67	−11	73
26	Erik Cole	LW	71	29	32	61	2	76
24	Scott Walker	RW	81	21	30	51	−10	45
22	Mike Commodore	D	82	7	22	29	0	113
61	Cory Stillman	LW	43	5	22	27	−8	24
16	Andrew Ladd	LW	65	11	10	21	1	46
25	Eric Belanger‡	C	56	8	12	20	−2	14
59	Chad LaRose	RW	80	6	12	18	−2	10
45	David Tanabe	D	60	5	12	17	5	44
27	Craig Adams	RW	82	7	7	14	−9	54
28	Andrew Hutchinson	D	41	3	11	14	0	30
48	Anton Babchuk	D	52	2	12	14	−6	30
2	Glen Wesley	D	68	1	12	13	11	56
7	Niclas Wallin	D	67	2	8	10	−2	48
6	Bret Hedican	D	50	0	10	10	−8	36
63	Josef Vasicek†	C	25	2	7	9	−6	22
5	Frantisek Kaberle	D	27	2	6	8	8	20
19	Trevor Letowski	RW	61	2	6	8	−8	18
8	Tim Gleason	D	57	2	4	6	−10	57
4	Dennis Seidenberg†	D	20	1	5	6	−12	2
14	Kevyn Adams‡	C	35	2	2	4	−10	17
47	John Grahame	G	28	0	3	3		2
18	Ryan Bayda	LW	9	1	1	2	−1	2
77	Anson Carter†	RW	10	1	0	1	−3	2
37	Keith Aucoin	C	8	0	1	1	1	0
30	Cam Ward	G	60	0	1	1		6
34	David Gove	LW	1	0	0	0	0	0

=== Goaltending ===
No.	Player	Regular season									
No.	Player	GP	W	L	OT	SA	GA	GAA	SV%	SO	TOI
30	Cam Ward	60	30	21	6	1625	167	2.93	.897	2	3422
47	John Grahame	28	10	13	2	702	72	2.85	.897	0	1515

== Awards and records ==
=== Awards ===
Type	Award/honor	Recipient	Ref
League (annual)	Frank J. Selke Trophy	Rod Brind'Amour	
League (in-season)	NHL All-Star Game selection	Eric Staal	
League (in-season)	NHL All-Star Game selection	Justin Williams	
League (in-season)	NHL Second Star of the Week	Rod Brind'Amour (November 19)	
Team	Good Guy Award	Mike Commodore	
Team	Most Valuable Player	Ray Whitney	
Team	Steve Chiasson Award	Rod Brind'Amour	

=== Milestones ===
Milestone	Player	Date	Ref
600th assist	Rod Brind'Amour	October 13, 2006	
1,000th point	Rod Brind'Amour	November 4, 2006	
400th goal scored	Rod Brind'Amour	February 17, 2007	

== Transactions ==
The Hurricanes were involved in the following transactions from June 20, 2006, the day after the deciding game of the 2006 Stanley Cup Final, through June 6, 2007, the day of the deciding game of the 2007 Stanley Cup Final.

=== Trades ===
Date	Details		Ref
July 18, 2006	To Carolina Hurricanes: Scott Walker	To Nashville Predators: Josef Vasicek	
September 29, 2006	To Carolina Hurricanes: Eric Belanger; Tim Gleason	To Los Angeles Kings: Oleg Tverdovsky; Rights to Jack Johnson	
November 21, 2006	To Carolina Hurricanes: Rights to Jakub Petruzalek; Conditional 5th-round pick in 2008	To New York Rangers: Brad Isbister	
November 29, 2006	To Carolina Hurricanes: Mark Flood	To Columbus Blue Jackets: Derrick Walser	
January 8, 2007	To Carolina Hurricanes: Dennis Seidenberg	To Phoenix Coyotes: Kevyn Adams	
February 9, 2007	To Carolina Hurricanes: Josef Vasicek	To Nashville Predators: Eric Belanger	
February 23, 2007	To Carolina Hurricanes: Anson Carter	To Columbus Blue Jackets: 5th-round pick in 2008	

=== Players acquired ===
Date	Player	Former team	Term	Via	Ref
July 1, 2006	John Grahame	Tampa Bay Lightning	2-year	Free agency	
July 6, 2006	Trevor Letowski	Columbus Blue Jackets	2-year	Free agency	
July 7, 2006	Patrick Dwyer	Chicago Wolves (AHL)	2-year	Free agency	
July 18, 2006	Shane Willis	Linkopings HC (SHL)	1-year	Free agency	
July 21, 2006	Mike Angelidis	Owen Sound Attack (OHL)	3-year	Free agency	
July 21, 2006	Tim Conboy	San Jose Sharks	1-year	Free agency	
July 21, 2006	Scott Kelman	Fresno Falcons (ECHL)	1-year	Free agency	
August 2, 2006	Jesse Boulerice	St. Louis Blues	1-year	Free agency	
August 4, 2006	Ryan Bayda	Manitoba Moose (AHL)	1-year	Free agency	
August 29, 2006	David Tanabe	Boston Bruins	1-year	Free agency	
August 30, 2006	Brad Isbister	Boston Bruins	1-year	Free agency	
March 26, 2007	Noah Babin	University of Notre Dame (CCHA)	2-year	Free agency	

=== Players lost ===
Date	Player	New team	Via (Note: In parentheses is the player's free agency group on July 1 if applicable.)	Ref
July 1, 2006	Matt Cullen	New York Rangers	Free agency (III)	
July 1, 2006	Martin Gerber	Ottawa Senators	Free agency (III)	
July 2, 2006	Doug Weight	St. Louis Blues	Free agency (III)	
July 3, 2006	Aaron Ward	New York Rangers	Free agency (III)	
July 25, 2006	Mark Recchi	Pittsburgh Penguins	Free agency (III)	
August 28, 2006	Chris Hajt	Fuchse Duisburg (DEL)	Free agency (VI)	
January 2007	Gordie Dwyer	Orebro HK (SWE-3)	Free agency (UFA)	
May 28, 2007	Vince Bellissmo	ERC Ingolstadt (DEL)	Free agency	

=== Signings ===
Date	Player	Term	Contract type	Ref
June 23, 2006	Rod Brind'Amour	5-year	Re-signing	
June 27, 2006	Frantisek Kaberle	4-year	Re-signing	
June 30, 2006	Craig Adams	3-year	Re-signing	
June 30, 2006	Andrew Hutchinson	2-year	Re-signing	
June 30, 2006	Niclas Wallin	4-year	Re-signing	
June 30, 2006	Justin Williams	5-year	Re-signing	
July 1, 2006	Mike Commodore	2-year	Re-signing	
July 1, 2006	Eric Staal	3-year	Re-signing	
July 2, 2006	Chad LaRose	2-year	Re-signing	
July 5, 2006	Erik Cole	3-year	Re-signing	
July 6, 2006	Glen Wesley	1-year	Re-signing	
July 12, 2006	Keith Aucoin	2-year	Re-signing	
July 12, 2006	David Gove	2-year	Re-signing	
July 14, 2006	Craig Kowalski	1-year	Re-signing	
July 14, 2006	Derrick Walser	1-year	Re-signing	
July 20, 2006	J. D. Forrest	1-year	Entry-level	
August 24, 2006	Joe Barnes	3-year	Entry-level	
August 31, 2006	Stephen Peat	1-year	Re-signing	
April 3, 2007	Nicolas Blanchard	3-year	Entry-level	
April 10, 2007	Bobby Hughes	3-year	Entry-level	
April 13, 2007	Ray Whitney	3-year	Extension	
May 17, 2007	Casey Borer	2-year	Entry-level	
May 18, 2007	Jakub Petruzalek	2-year	Entry-level	
May 31, 2007	Cam Ward	3-year	Extension	
June 1, 2007	Glen Wesley	1-year	Extension	

== Draft picks ==
Carolina's picks at the 2006 NHL entry draft in Vancouver, British Columbia.

Round	#	Player	Nationality	College/Junior/Club team (League)
2	63	Jamie McBain (D)	United States	US National Team Development Program (NAHL)
3	93	Harrison Reed (RW)	Canada	Sarnia Sting (OHL)
4	123	Bobby Hughes (C)	Canada	Kingston Frontenacs (OHL)
5	153	Stefan Chaput (C)	Canada	Lewiston Maineiacs (QMJHL)
6	183	Nick Dodge (RW)	Canada	Clarkson University (NCAA)
7	213	Justin Krueger (D)	Switzerland	Cornell University (NCAA)
