= 2006–07 Florida Panthers season =

National Hockey League team season

2006–07 Florida Panthers
- Division: 4th Southeast
- Conference: 12th Eastern
- 2006–07 record: 35–31–16
- Home record: 23–12–6
- Road record: 12–19–10
- Goals for: 247
- Goals against: 257

Team information
- General manager: Jacques Martin
- Coach: Jacques Martin
- Captain: Olli Jokinen
- Alternate captains: Martin Gelinas (Dec.–Apr.); Chris Gratton; Joe Nieuwendyk (Oct.–Dec.); Gary Roberts (Oct.–Feb.); Ruslan Salei
- Arena: BankAtlantic Center
- Minor league affiliates: Rochester Americans; Florida Everblades

Team leaders
- Goals: Olli Jokinen (39)
- Assists: Olli Jokinen (52)
- Points: Olli Jokinen (91)
- Penalty minutes: Steve Montador (119)
- Plus/minus: Jay Bouwmeester (+23)
- Wins: Ed Belfour (27)
- Goals against average: Ed Belfour (2.77)

The 2006–07 Florida Panthers season began on October 6 with a game at the BankAtlantic Center against the Boston Bruins. It was the Panthers' 13th season in the National Hockey League (NHL). The Panthers failed to qualify for the playoffs for the sixth consecutive season for the first time in franchise history.

== Off-season ==
General manager Mike Keenan resigned on September 3 and was replaced by head coach Jacques Martin.

== Regular season ==
The Panthers finished the regular season with the fewest power-play opportunities for with 337.

=== Season standings ===
Southeast Division
No.	CR		GP	W	L	OTL	GF	GA	Pts
1	3	**Atlanta Thrashers**	82	43	28	11	246	245	97
2	7	**Tampa Bay Lightning**	82	44	33	5	253	261	93
3	11	Carolina Hurricanes	82	40	34	8	241	253	88
4	12	Florida Panthers	82	35	31	16	247	257	86
5	14	Washington Capitals	82	28	40	14	235	286	70

Note: No. = Division rank, CR = Conference rank, W = Wins, L = Losses, T = Ties, GF = Goals For, GA = Goals Against, Pts = Points
Teams that qualified for the playoffs are highlighted in bold.

Eastern Conference
R		Div	GP	W	L	OTL	GF	GA	Pts
**1**	**P -** Buffalo Sabres	**NE**	**82**	**53**	**22**	**7**	**308**	**242**	113
**2**	**Y -** New Jersey Devils	**AT**	**82**	**49**	**24**	**9**	**216**	**201**	107
**3**	**Y -** Atlanta Thrashers	**SE**	**82**	**43**	**28**	**11**	**246**	**245**	97
**4**	**X -** Ottawa Senators	**NE**	**82**	**48**	**25**	**9**	**288**	**222**	105
**5**	**X -** Pittsburgh Penguins	**AT**	**82**	**47**	**24**	**11**	**277**	**246**	105
**6**	**X -** New York Rangers	**AT**	**82**	**42**	**30**	**10**	**242**	**216**	94
**7**	**X -** Tampa Bay Lightning	**SE**	**82**	**44**	**33**	**5**	**253**	**261**	93
**8**	**X -** New York Islanders	**AT**	**82**	**40**	**30**	**12**	**248**	**240**	92
8.5
9	Toronto Maple Leafs	NE	82	40	31	11	258	269	91
10	Montreal Canadiens	NE	82	42	34	6	245	256	90
11	Carolina Hurricanes	SE	82	40	34	8	241	253	88
12	Florida Panthers	SE	82	35	31	16	247	257	86
13	Boston Bruins	NE	82	35	41	6	219	289	76
14	Washington Capitals	SE	82	28	40	14	235	286	70
15	Philadelphia Flyers	AT	82	22	48	12	214	303	56

Divisions: AT – Atlantic, NE – Northeast, SE – Southeast

P – Clinched Presidents Trophy; Y – Clinched division; X – Clinched playoff spot

== Schedule and results ==
2006–07 regular season
October: 5–7–2 (home: 4–2–0; road: 1–5–2)

Game	Date	Visitor	Score	Home	OT	Decision	Attendance	Record	Points	Recap
1	October 6	Boston	3–8	Florida		Auld	19,250	1–0–0	2	W
2	October 7	Florida	0–6	Atlanta		Belfour	14,239	1–1–0	2	L
3	October 9	Florida	1–2	Toronto	SO	Auld	19,102	1–1–1	3	OTL
4	October 11	Carolina	3–6	Florida		Auld	14,312	2–1–1	5	W
5	October 13	Tampa Bay	2–3	Florida		Auld	15,208	3–1–1	7	W
6	October 14	Florida	1–4	Tampa Bay		Belfour	19,926	3–2–1	7	L
7	October 18	Florida	2–5	Washington		Auld	10,125	3–3–1	7	L
8	October 20	Philadelphia	2–3	Florida		Belfour	17,194	4–3–1	9	W
9	October 21	Florida	2–4	Atlanta		Auld	16,178	4–4–1	9	L
10	October 23	Atlanta	6–3	Florida		Auld	13,102	4–5–1	9	L
11	October 25	Florida	4–2	NY Rangers		Belfour	18,200	5–5–1	11	W
12	October 26	Florida	0–2	New Jersey		Auld	11,594	5–6–1	11	L
13	October 28	Florida	3–4	NY Islanders	SO	Belfour	10,455	5–6–2	12	OTL
14	October 31	San Jose	2–1	Florida		Auld	10,081	5–7–2	12	L

November: 3–7–3 (home: 2–4–1; road: 1–3–2)

Game	Date	Visitor	Score	Home	OT	Decision	Attendance	Record	Points	Recap
15	November 2	Toronto	2–4	Florida		Belfour	13,233	6–7–2	14	W
16	November 8	NY Rangers	4–3	Florida	SO	Belfour	16,893	6–7–3	15	OTL
17	November 10	Florida	4–5	Buffalo	OT	Auld	18,690	6–7–4	16	OTL
18	November 11	Florida	2–4	New Jersey		Belfour	14,112	6–8–4	16	L
19	November 13	Washington	4–1	Florida		Auld	12,108	6–9–4	16	L
20	November 16	Montreal	1–5	Florida		Belfour	13,506	7–9–4	18	W
21	November 18	NY Islanders	4–1	Florida		Belfour	16,833	7–10–4	18	L
22	November 20	Florida	3–2	Boston		Auld	11,742	8–10–4	20	W
23	November 22	Tampa Bay	6–4	Florida		Auld	14,516	8–11–4	20	L
24	November 24	Ottawa	6–4	Florida		Belfour	16,544	8–12–4	20	L
25	November 25	Florida	0–1	Atlanta		Auld	17,053	8–13–4	20	L
26	November 28	Florida	0–1	Montreal	SO	Auld	21,273	8–13–5	21	OTL
27	November 30	Florida	0–6	Ottawa		Auld	17,814	8–14–5	21	L

December: 7–5–2 (home: 4–2–1; road: 3–3–1)

Game	Date	Visitor	Score	Home	OT	Decision	Attendance	Record	Points	Recap
28	December 2	Atlanta	3–1	Florida		Belfour	13,333	8–15–5	21	L
29	December 5	Florida	3–2	Pittsburgh		Auld	12,511	9–15–5	23	W
30	December 7	Buffalo	1–3	Florida		Auld	15,385	10–15–5	25	W
31	December 9	Florida	4–5	NY Islanders	SO	Auld	12,825	10–15–6	26	OTL
32	December 10	Florida	1–2	NY Rangers		Belfour	18,200	10–16–6	26	L
33	December 12	Anaheim	5–4	Florida		Auld	13,140	10–17–6	26	L
34	December 14	Florida	1–2	Buffalo		Belfour	18,690	10–18–6	26	L
35	December 16	Florida	6–3	Boston		Belfour	10,965	11–18–6	28	W
36	December 19	Florida	7–3	Toronto		Belfour	19,444	12–18–6	30	W
37	December 21	NY Rangers	2–3	Florida		Belfour	17,556	13–18–6	32	W
38	December 23	Carolina	3–2	Florida	OT	Belfour	16,147	13–18–7	33	OTL
39	December 26	Florida	2–4	Carolina		Auld	18,639	13–19–7	33	L
40	December 27	Philadelphia	1–3	Florida		Belfour	17,771	14–19–7	35	W
41	December 29	Montreal	1–3	Florida		Belfour	19,772	15–19–7	37	W

January: 4–4–3 (home: 3–1–1; road: 1–3–2)

Game	Date	Visitor	Score	Home	OT	Decision	Attendance	Record	Points	Recap
42	January 2	Florida	1–4	Edmonton		Belfour	16,839	15–20–7	37	L
43	January 4	Florida	4–5	Calgary	OT	Auld	19,289	15–20–8	38	OTL
44	January 7	Florida	3–4	Vancouver	SO	Belfour	18,630	15–20–9	39	OTL
45	January 10	Pittsburgh	2–5	Florida		Auld	16,098	16–20–9	41	W
46	January 11	Florida	4–6	Carolina		Auld	13,552	16–21–9	41	L
47	January 13	Washington	3–7	Florida		Belfour	15,061	17–21–9	43	W
48	January 16	Carolina	3–2	Florida	OT	Belfour	10,317	17–21–10	44	OTL
49	January 18	Toronto	3–2	Florida		Auld	12,242	17–22–10	44	L
50	January 20	Florida	4–1	Washington		Belfour	13,877	18–22–10	46	W
51	January 27	New Jersey	2–4	Florida		Belfour	18,136	19–22–10	48	W
52	January 30	Florida	0–3	Pittsburgh		Belfour	15,405	19–23–10	48	L

February: 6–3–3 (home: 4–1–1; road: 2–2–2)

Game	Date	Visitor	Score	Home	OT	Decision	Attendance	Record	Points	Recap
53	February 1	Washington	3–6	Florida		Belfour	11,300	20–23–10	50	W
54	February 3	Los Angeles	7–0	Florida		Belfour	15,108	20–24–10	50	L
55	February 6	Florida	4–5	Colorado	OT	Belfour	17,065	20–24–11	51	OTL
56	February 8	Florida	2–4	Minnesota		Belfour	18,568	20–25–11	51	L
57	February 10	Phoenix	2–5	Florida		Belfour	15,312	21–25–11	53	W
58	February 13	Florida	1–0	Montreal		Belfour	21,273	22–25–11	55	W
59	February 14	Florida	0–4	Ottawa		Belfour	18,561	22–26–11	55	L
60	February 17	Tampa Bay	4–5	Florida	OT	Belfour	17,813	23–26–11	57	W
61	February 20	Florida	2–3	Tampa Bay	SO	Belfour	19,319	23–26–12	58	OTL
62	February 22	Pittsburgh	2–1	Florida	OT	Belfour	17,102	23–26–13	59	OTL
63	February 24	Boston	2–7	Florida		Belfour	16,816	24–26–13	61	W
64	February 27	Florida	6–5	Washington	SO	Belfour	10,979	25–26–13	63	W

March: 9–4–1 (home: 6–2–1; road: 3–2–0)

Game	Date	Visitor	Score	Home	OT	Decision	Attendance	Record	Points	Recap
65	March 1	Dallas	1–2	Florida	OT	Belfour	11,822	26–26–13	65	W
66	March 3	Tampa Bay	2–6	Florida		Belfour	17,299	27–26–13	67	W
67	March 6	Florida	2–4	Atlanta		Belfour	12,566	27–27–13	67	L
68	March 8	Florida	2–1	Philadelphia		Belfour	19,489	28–27–13	69	W
69	March 10	Atlanta	2–3	Florida		Belfour	17,927	29–27–13	71	W
70	March 13	Florida	1–3	Carolina		Belfour	18,639	29–28–13	71	L
71	March 15	Buffalo	5–3	Florida		Belfour	18,111	29–29–13	71	L
72	March 17	NY Islanders	5–8	Florida		Belfour	17,078	30–29–13	73	W
73	March 20	Florida	4–1	Philadelphia		Belfour	18,721	31–29–13	75	W
74	March 22	Ottawa	4–2	Florida		Belfour	14,202	31–30–13	75	L
75	March 24	New Jersey	4–3	Florida	SO	Belfour	16,101	31–30–14	76	OTL
76	March 27	Florida	5–2	Tampa Bay		Belfour	18,856	32–30–14	78	W
77	March 28	Atlanta	2–3	Florida	SO	Anderson	12,864	33–30–14	80	W
78	March 30	Washington	2–3	Florida	OT	Belfour	15,712	34–30–14	82	W

April: 1–1–2 (home: 0–0–1; road: 1–1–1)

Game	Date	Visitor	Score	Home	OT	Decision	Attendance	Record	Points	Recap
79	April 1	Carolina	4–3	Florida	SO	Belfour	17,878	34–30–15	83	OTL
80	April 3	Florida	0–1	Washington		Anderson	16,311	34–31–15	83	L
81	April 6	Florida	7–2	Tampa Bay		Belfour	21,002	35–31–15	85	W
82	April 7	Florida	2–4	Carolina	OT	Anderson	18,639	35–31–16	86	OTL

Legend: W Win (2 points) L Loss (0 points) OTL Overtime/shootout loss (1 point)

== Player statistics ==
=== Scoring ===
- Position abbreviations: C = Center; D = Defense; G = Goaltender; LW = Left wing; RW = Right wing
- † = Joined team via a transaction (e.g., trade, waivers, signing) during the season. Stats reflect time with the Panthers only.
- ‡ = Left team via a transaction (e.g., trade, waivers, release) during the season. Stats reflect time with the Panthers only.

No.	Player	Pos	Regular season					
No.	Player	Pos	GP	G	A	Pts	+/-	PIM
12	Olli Jokinen	C	82	39	52	91	18	78
16	Nathan Horton	C	82	31	31	62	15	61
15	Jozef Stumpel	C	73	23	34	57	2	22
9	Stephen Weiss	C	74	20	28	48	−1	28
23	Martin Gelinas	LW	82	14	30	44	7	36
4	Jay Bouwmeester	D	82	12	30	42	23	66
18	Ville Peltonen	LW	72	17	20	37	7	28
77	Chris Gratton	C	81	13	22	35	1	94
24	Ruslan Salei	D	82	6	26	32	−13	102
85	Rostislav Olesz	C	75	11	19	30	2	28
10	Gary Roberts‡	LW	50	13	16	29	5	71
26	Mike Van Ryn	D	78	4	25	29	−5	64
13	Juraj Kolnik	RW	64	11	14	25	2	18
5	Bryan Allen	D	82	4	21	25	7	112
8	Joel Kwiatkowski‡	D	41	5	5	10	−5	20
46	David Booth	LW	48	3	7	10	0	12
11	Gregory Campbell	LW	79	6	3	9	−10	66
7	Steve Montador	D	72	1	8	9	1	119
25	Joe Nieuwendyk‡	C	15	5	3	8	−4	4
44	Todd Bertuzzi‡	RW	7	1	6	7	−4	13
21	Alexei Semenov	D	23	0	5	5	9	28
38	Janis Sprukts	C	13	1	2	3	1	2
2	Branislav Mezei	D	45	0	3	3	5	55
50	Drew Larman	C	16	2	0	2	−3	2
54	Kamil Kreps	C	14	1	1	2	−1	6
20	Ed Belfour	G	58	0	2	2		10
55	Ric Jackman‡	D	7	1	0	1	−3	10
6	Noah Welch†	D	2	1	0	1	3	2
35	Alex Auld	G	27	0	1	1		2
51	Rob Globke	C	19	0	1	1	−3	0
47	Martin Lojek	D	3	0	1	1	2	0
57	Anthony Stewart	C	10	0	1	1	1	2
31	Craig Anderson	G	5	0	0	0		0
40	Greg Jacina	LW	3	0	0	0	−1	2

=== Goaltending ===
No.	Player	Regular season									
No.	Player	GP	W	L	OT	SA	GA	GAA	SV%	SO	TOI
20	Ed Belfour	58	27	17	10	1550	152	2.77	.902	1	3289
35	Alex Auld	27	7	13	5	729	82	3.35	.888	1	1471
31	Craig Anderson	5	1	1	1	116	8	2.21	.931	0	217

== Awards and records ==
=== Awards ===
Type	Award/honor	Recipient	Ref
League (in-season)	NHL All-Star Game selection	Jay Bouwmeester	
League (in-season)	NHL Second Star of the Week	Olli Jokinen (March 4)	
League (in-season)	NHL Second Star of the Week	Olli Jokinen (April 1)	
League (in-season)	NHL Third Star of the Week	Olli Jokinen (January 14)	

=== Milestones ===
Milestone	Player	Date	Ref
First game	Janis Sprukts	October 20, 2006	
First game	Drew Larman	November 13, 2006	
First game	David Booth	November 20, 2006	
First game	Kamil Kreps	January 7, 2007	
First game	Martin Lojek	February 3, 2007	
1,000th game played	Chris Gratton	March 22, 2007	

== Transactions ==
The Panthers were involved in the following transactions from June 20, 2006, the day after the deciding game of the 2006 Stanley Cup Finals, through June 6, 2007, the day of the deciding game of the 2007 Stanley Cup Finals.

=== Trades ===
Date	Details		Ref
June 23, 2006	To Florida Panthers: Bryan Allen; Alex Auld; Todd Bertuzzi	To Vancouver Canucks: Lukas Krajicek; Roberto Luongo; 6th-round pick in 2006	
June 24, 2006	To Florida Panthers: Craig Anderson	To Chicago Blackhawks: 6th-round pick in 2008	
June 24, 2006	To Florida Panthers: Nashville's 4th-round pick in 2006	To Pittsburgh Penguins: 4th-round pick in 2007	
January 3, 2007	To Florida Panthers: Conditional draft pick in 2007	To Anaheim Ducks: Ric Jackman	
February 26, 2007	To Florida Panthers: Noah Welch	To Pittsburgh Penguins: Gary Roberts	
February 27, 2007	To Florida Panthers: Rights to Shawn Matthias; Conditional draft picks (Note: Condition not met. If Detroit re-signed Bertuzzi, Florida would have received a draft pick in 2007 and 2008. Bertuzzi signed as a free agent with the Anaheim Ducks on July 2, 2007.)	To Detroit Red Wings: Todd Bertuzzi	
February 27, 2007	To Florida Panthers: 4th-round pick in 2007	To Pittsburgh Penguins: Joel Kwiatkowski	

=== Players acquired ===
Date	Player	Former team	Term	Via	Ref
July 2, 2006	Ruslan Salei	Anaheim Ducks	4-year	Free agency	
July 6, 2006	Ari Vallin	Oulun Karpat (Liiga)		Free agency	
July 25, 2006	Ed Belfour	Toronto Maple Leafs	1-year	Free agency	
September 14, 2006	David Brine	Manitoba Moose (AHL)		Free agency	
September 14, 2006	Franklin MacDonald	Halifax Mooseheads (QMJHL)		Free agency	
September 14, 2006	Adam Taylor	Victoria Salmon Kings (ECHL)		Free agency	
March 26, 2007	Cory Murphy	HIFK (Liiga)	2-year	Free agency (Note: Contract begins with the 2007–08 season.)	

=== Players lost ===
Date	Player	New team	Via (Note: In parentheses is the player's free agency group on July 1 if applicable.)	Ref
N/A	Alexander Karpovtsev	HC Sibir Novosibirsk (RSL)	Free agency (III)	
July 1, 2006	Dan Focht (Note: Focht retired.)		Contract expiration (UFA)	
July 1, 2006	Sean Hill	New York Islanders (Note: Hill signed with the Islanders on August 15.)	Buyout	
July 5, 2006	Jamie McLennan	Calgary Flames	Free agency (III)	
July 10, 2006	Phil Osaer	Cardiff Devils (EIHL)	Free agency (UFA)	
July 13, 2006	Jon Sim	Atlanta Thrashers	Free agency (UFA)	
July 26, 2006	Jamie Allison	Ottawa Senators	Free agency (III)	
August 2, 2006	Serge Payer	Ottawa Senators	Free agency (UFA)	
October 2006	Victor Uchevatov	Milwaukee Admirals (AHL)	Free agency (UFA)	
October 5, 2006	Grant McNeill	Wilkes-Barre/Scranton Penguins (AHL)	Free agency (UFA)	
December 6, 2006	Joe Nieuwendyk		Retirement	

=== Signings ===
Date	Player	Term	Contract type	Ref
July 5, 2006	Bryan Allen	1-year	Re-signing	
July 5, 2006	Branislav Mezei	2-year	Re-signing	
July 11, 2006	Nathan Horton	1-year	Re-signing	
July 12, 2006	Steve Montador	1-year	Re-signing	
July 13, 2006	Gregory Campbell	2-year	Re-signing	
July 14, 2006	Alex Auld	1-year	Re-signing	
July 14, 2006	Alexei Semenov	1-year	Re-signing	
July 14, 2006	Stephen Weiss	1-year	Re-signing	
July 17, 2006	Craig Anderson	1-year	Re-signing	
July 18, 2006	Juraj Kolnik	1-year	Re-signing	
July 20, 2006	David Booth		Entry-level	
July 26, 2006	Jay Bouwmeester	2-year	Arbitration award	
July 28, 2006	Ric Jackman	1-year	Re-signing	
July 28, 2006	Mike Van Ryn	4-year	Re-signing	
April 25, 2007	Ville Peltonen	2-year	Extension	
June 1, 2007	Dan Collins		Entry-level	
June 1, 2007	Kenndal McArdle		Entry-level	
June 1, 2007	Tyler Plante		Entry-level	

== Draft picks ==
Florida's picks at the 2006 NHL entry draft in Vancouver, British Columbia.

Round	#	Player	Nationality	NHL team	College/Junior/Club team (League)
1	10	Michael Frolik (RW)	Czech Republic	Florida Panthers	Rabat Kladno (Czech Extraliga)
3	73	Brady Calla (RW)	Canada	Florida Panthers	Everett Silvertips (WHL)
4	103	Michael Caruso (D)	Canada	Florida Panthers	Guelph Storm (OHL)
4	116	Derrick LaPoint (D)	United States	Florida Panthers (from Nashville)	Eau Claire North (USHS-WI)
6	155	Peter Aston (D)	Canada	Florida Panthers (from Pittsburgh)	Windsor Spitfires (OHL)
7	193	Marc Cheverie (G)	Canada	Florida Panthers	Nanaimo Clippers (BCHL)
