= 2006–07 New York Rangers season =

NHL hockey team season

2006–07 New York Rangers
- Division: 3rd Atlantic
- Conference: 6th Eastern
- 2006–07 record: 42–30–10
- Home record: 21–15–5
- Road record: 21–15–5
- Goals for: 242
- Goals against: 216

Team information
- General manager: Glen Sather
- Coach: Tom Renney
- Captain: Jaromir Jagr
- Alternate captains: Brendan Shanahan; Martin Straka
- Arena: Madison Square Garden
- Average attendance: 18,200
- Minor league affiliates: Hartford Wolf Pack; Charlotte Checkers

Team leaders
- Goals: Jaromir Jagr (30)
- Assists: Jaromir Jagr (66)
- Points: Jaromir Jagr (96)
- Penalty minutes: Sean Avery (174)
- Plus/minus: Marek Malik (+32)
- Wins: Henrik Lundqvist (37)
- Goals against average: Henrik Lundqvist (2.34)

The 2006–07 New York Rangers season was the franchise's 80th season of play and their 81st season overall. It saw the team attempting to build on their surprising run into the playoffs the previous season.

After being swept by their cross-river rivals the New Jersey Devils in the first round of the 2006 Stanley Cup playoffs, the Rangers looked to add playoff experience through off-season free agent signings. As such, the Rangers signed forward Matt Cullen and defenseman Aaron Ward from the Stanley Cup champion Carolina Hurricanes, in addition to three-time champion Brendan Shanahan from the Detroit Red Wings. However, the Rangers lost a few big names from their strong regular season run, including assistant captain Steve Rucchin, Martin Rucinsky, Tom Poti and Petr Sykora.

== Regular season ==
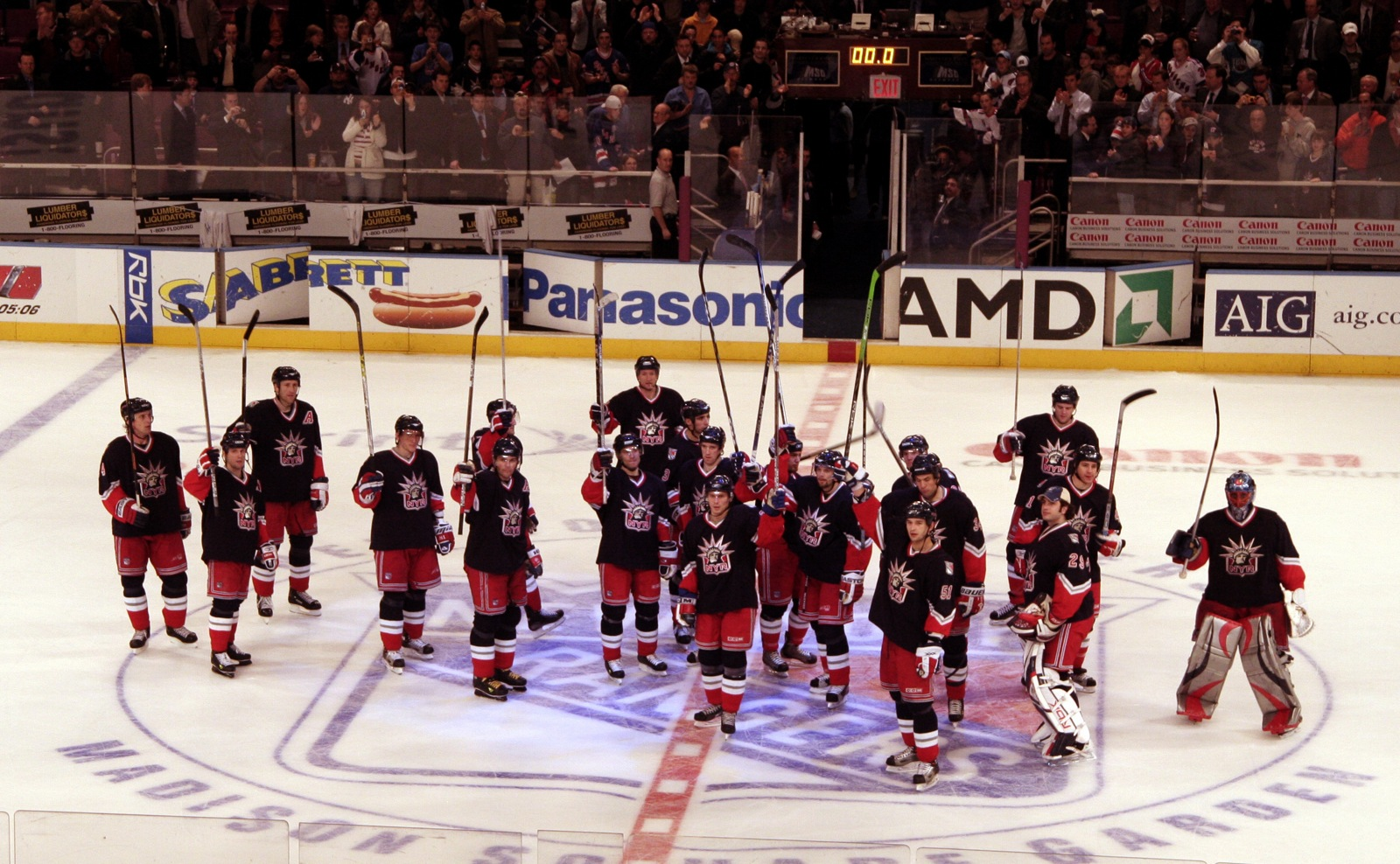
The Rangers salute their fans after a victory during the season.

On October 5, 2006, before the Rangers opened regular season play at Madison Square Garden against the Washington Capitals, Jágr was named as the 24th captain in Rangers history. In the 5–2 victory, Jaromir Jagr scored on the season's first shot and Brendan Shanahan scored twice to tally his 600th career NHL goal. Despite a 2–0 start, the Rangers struggled through the month of October and finished the calendar month in the midst of their west coast swing with a 5–6 record.

Things began to turn in the right direction for the team in the month of November. The Rangers began the month with wins over the Anaheim Ducks and San Jose Sharks to bring their record above .500 and after an 8–3–3-month, the Rangers had a 13–9–3 record.

The Rangers rose high in December, with a five-game winning streak during the second week, but then crashed hard back to Earth. A 9–2 loss at Toronto on December 16 keyed a seven-game losing streak which included two heart-breaking losses in Florida (one to the Panthers in which the Rangers led 2–0 after two periods and lost 3–2 and another two nights later to the Lightning in which the Rangers led 3–0 after two and lost 4–3). The Rangers were also shut-out in their final two losses of the streak. The Rangers got back on the right track and snapped their losing skid with a 4–1 win against the Washington Capitals in their final game of 2006. This win would key a four-game winning streak; however, the Rangers lost eight of their next 11 games as they limped into February.

On February 5, 2007, in a trade with the Los Angeles Kings, the Rangers acquired the agitator Sean Avery. Avery's first few games with the Rangers saw an increase in the team's intensity, but still a lack of luck in the standings. In his first game, the Rangers lost to the New Jersey Devils 3–2 in a shootout, then proceeded to win three straight against the likes of Tampa Bay, Washington and Carolina.

Against the Philadelphia Flyers on February 17, the Rangers lost not only the game (5–3) but also lost Brendan Shanahan to a concussion after an open ice collision with Mike Knuble in the third period. Shanahan would miss the next 15 games. As of the trading deadline on February 27, the Rangers were 29–27–6 and a run at a playoff berth looked unlikely.

During the month of March, the Rangers lost a number of other players to injury, including Fedor Tyutin, Marcel Hossa and Karel Rachunek, all to medial collateral ligament (MCL) sprains. However, thanks to the stellar play of goaltender Henrik Lundqvist, the Rangers went 10–2–3 in the month of March to move into playoff position and on April 5, 2007, with a 3–1 win over the Montreal Canadiens, clinched a playoff berth for the second consecutive season. The Rangers concluded the regular season with a record of 13–3–4 after the trading deadline and 17–6–6 after the acquisition of Sean Avery from Los Angeles.

On their final night of the regular season, the Rangers lost 2–1 to the Pittsburgh Penguins, but thanks to Tampa Bay's shootout loss to the Atlanta Thrashers, the Rangers locked up the sixth seed in the Eastern Conference playoffs for the second straight year.

=== Season standings ===
Atlantic Division
No.	CR		GP	W	L	OTL	GF	GA	Pts
1	2	**New Jersey Devils**	82	49	24	9	216	201	107
2	5	**Pittsburgh Penguins**	82	47	24	11	277	246	105
3	6	**New York Rangers**	82	42	30	10	242	216	94
4	8	**New York Islanders**	82	40	30	12	248	240	92
5	15	Philadelphia Flyers	82	22	48	12	214	303	56

Note: No. = Division rank, CR = Conference rank, W = Wins, L = Losses, T = Ties, GF = Goals For, GA = Goals Against, Pts = Points
Teams that qualified for the playoffs are highlighted in bold.

Eastern Conference
R		Div	GP	W	L	OTL	GF	GA	Pts
**1**	**P -** Buffalo Sabres	**NE**	**82**	**53**	**22**	**7**	**308**	**242**	113
**2**	**Y -** New Jersey Devils	**AT**	**82**	**49**	**24**	**9**	**216**	**201**	107
**3**	**Y -** Atlanta Thrashers	**SE**	**82**	**43**	**28**	**11**	**246**	**245**	97
**4**	**X -** Ottawa Senators	**NE**	**82**	**48**	**25**	**9**	**288**	**222**	105
**5**	**X -** Pittsburgh Penguins	**AT**	**82**	**47**	**24**	**11**	**277**	**246**	105
**6**	**X -** New York Rangers	**AT**	**82**	**42**	**30**	**10**	**242**	**216**	94
**7**	**X -** Tampa Bay Lightning	**SE**	**82**	**44**	**33**	**5**	**253**	**261**	93
**8**	**X -** New York Islanders	**AT**	**82**	**40**	**30**	**12**	**248**	**240**	92
8.5
9	Toronto Maple Leafs	NE	82	40	31	11	258	269	91
10	Montreal Canadiens	NE	82	42	34	6	245	256	90
11	Carolina Hurricanes	SE	82	40	34	8	241	253	88
12	Florida Panthers	SE	82	35	31	16	247	257	86
13	Boston Bruins	NE	82	35	41	6	219	289	76
14	Washington Capitals	SE	82	28	40	14	235	286	70
15	Philadelphia Flyers	AT	82	22	48	12	214	303	56

Divisions: AT – Atlantic, NE – Northeast, SE – Southeast

P – Clinched Presidents Trophy; Y – Clinched division; X – Clinched playoff spot

== Playoffs ==
The New York Rangers ended the 2006–07 regular season as the Eastern Conference's sixth seed.

=== Eastern Conference Quarterfinals: vs. (3) Atlanta Thrashers ===
Entering the 2007 Stanley Cup playoffs, the New York Rangers had not won a playoff game since May 18, 1997, against the Philadelphia Flyers, having lost seven consecutive playoff games in that time span. They began the Eastern Conference Quarterfinals against the Atlanta Thrashers, a team making their first playoff appearance in franchise history.

In front of a sellout crowd in Atlanta for Game 1, the Rangers struck first with a Jaromir Jagr goal 12:50 into the first period to take a 1–0 lead. Michal Rozsival added a power play goal four minutes later to extend the Ranger lead to 2–0. Atlanta's Eric Belanger tallied a power play goal in the first period's final minute to make the score 2–1 at first intermission. The Rangers held a two-goal lead two other times through the remainder of the game, but Atlanta cut the deficit back to one on both occasions, with their final tally coming from former Ranger Pascal Dupuis early in the third period. Atlanta pressured for the equalizer for the final minutes but could not beat Henrik Lundqvist for a fourth goal and the Rangers prevailed 4–3. Not only was the victory the Rangers first playoff win in nearly ten years, it was also the first time the Rangers won Game 1 of a playoff series since the 1994 Eastern Conference Semifinals against the Washington Capitals. In addition, the four goals scored by New York in Game 1 matched their four-game offensive output against the New Jersey Devils from the year prior.

Atlanta switched goaltenders for Game 2, giving the nod to Johan Hedberg over Kari Lehtonen. The Rangers would strike first again, this time on a fluke goal credited to Sean Avery. Avery dumped the puck into the offensive zone from the red line, causing Hedberg to leave the crease in order to play the puck behind the net. The puck caromed off the boards in a peculiar manner and ended up in the net. After the bizarre goal, the game settled into a goaltending duel between Hedberg and Lundqvist. Atlanta would tie the game five minutes into the third period on a goal by Ilya Kovalchuk. The Rangers, however, would prevail, winning on a Brendan Shanahan goal with four minutes to play.

Up 2–0 in the series, the Rangers returned home for Game 3, and the Atlanta Thrashers returned to Kari Lehtonen in net. The switch did not work, as the Rangers struck 32 seconds into the game and would not let up from there. Jaromir Jagr tied an NHL record with three assists in the first period as Michael Nylander scored twice and Marek Malik added another to give New York a 3–0 lead after one. Rookie Ryan Callahan scored twice in the second period (the first two playoff goals of his career), Brendan Shanahan added a power play goal midway through the third period, and Nylander completed the hat trick seven minutes later to seal a 7–0 Game 3 victory. The 7–0 victory was the first playoff shutout in Henrik Lundqvist's career and the largest margin of victory in a playoff shutout in franchise history.

Atlanta switched back to Hedberg in Game 4 and struck first to take their first lead of the series with a Keith Tkachuk goal in the first period. The Rangers would respond just over a minute later with Michal Rozsival's second power play goal of the series to make the score 1–1 after one period. Atlanta would take the lead for a second time in the second period on a goal by Greg de Vries, but the Rangers would counter again, this time with a Brendan Shanahan goal to tie the game at 2–2 after two periods. Early in the third period Matt Cullen would score the eventual game winner, driving a rolling puck from the point off the crossbar. The puck bounced straight down and at first glance never crossed the goal line. After a five-minute video review, the puck was clearly shown to have crossed the line in its entirety while on edge and the goal counted. Jaromir Jagr added an empty net goal late in the period to seal a 4–2 win and a series sweep. The sweep was only the third sweep of a seven-game playoff series in franchise history (the other sweeps came against the Chicago Blackhawks in 1972 and the New York Islanders in 1994).

=== Eastern Conference Semifinals: vs. (1) Buffalo Sabres ===
After sweeping Atlanta in the first round, the Rangers next opponent was the Eastern Conference's top seed (and the regular season Presidents' Trophy winner), the Buffalo Sabres. The Sabres had been a powerful offensive team in the regular season, scoring 308 goals in the 82 games (20 more than the second place team in that department, the Ottawa Senators with 288). The Sabres had four players score over 30 goals during the season, led by Thomas Vanek with 43 in his sophomore campaign.

The series did not start well for the Rangers in western New York. Despite playing a scoreless first period, the key development in the first twenty minutes was a knee injury suffered by Ranger defenseman Michal Rozsival. Rozsival would see the ice for two shifts in the second period but could not stay in the game. As a result, the Rangers were forced to play the remainder of the game with five defensemen, a recipe for disaster against a team as talented offensively as the Sabres. Indeed, the result was a disaster for New York, as the Sabres struck for three goals in four minutes, two coming from the aforementioned Vanek, and Buffalo led 3–0 after two. The Rangers finally beat Ryan Miller halfway through the third period to cut the deficit to 3–1, thanks to a Marcel Hossa tally, but it would not be enough. Three minutes later Jason Pominville was awarded a goal on the first of several controversial video reviews in the series; the controversy in this case coming from the appearance that Pominville had punched the puck into the net. Brendan Shanahan scored a power play goal late for the Rangers to make it 4–2, but Drew Stafford hit the empty net to seal a 5–2 Sabre victory in Game 1.

The tide turned slightly for the Rangers in Game 2, but the result would not. The Rangers scored first this time around, on a Martin Straka power play goal midway through the first, but Brian Campbell and the Sabres responded with a goal on the man advantage 50 seconds later to even the game at one. Late in the second period, the Rangers scored again on the power play, this time with Paul Mara getting the tally, to take a 2–1 lead at second intermission. Things would unravel for the Rangers in the third as an errant Marek Malik pass was intercepted before exiting the defensive zone and Chris Drury converted the play into the equalizer goal 24 seconds into the period. Buffalo carried the momentum from there and Thomas Vanek netted the eventual game winner after a scramble in front at 10:11 of the third. The Sabres hung on to win 3–2 and take a 2–0 lead into the series.

The series shifted to New York City and Madison Square Garden for Game 3, with the Rangers in desperate need of a victory. For the second time in three games in the series, the game remained scoreless after one period of play; however, the Rangers struck early in the second, shortly after a power play opportunity had expired. Marek Malik kept the puck in at the blue line and Jaromir Jagr fired a shot that Ryan Miller stopped and thought he had covered. Unfortunately for the Sabres, the puck slipped behind him and Jagr followed up on the play by putting the loose puck in for his first goal of the series, giving the Rangers the 1–0 lead. A few minutes later, after driving hard to the net Karel Rachunek appeared to have given the Rangers a 2–0 lead when the puck deflected off his skate and past Miller into the open net. After a second controversial video review, the officials determined that Rachunek had kicked the puck into the net, negating the goal. Said Rangers Head Coach Tom Renney after the game, "it has to be a distinct kicking motion. If that's distinct then we're all in trouble." In the third, Buffalo would even the score with a power play goal by co-captain Daniel Briere with under eight minutes to play in regulation, forcing overtime. Buffalo nearly buried the game in the first overtime session 19 minutes in while shorthanded, but Derek Roy's shot rang off the post behind Rangers netminder Henrik Lundqvist and out. In double overtime, it was Rozsival who would be the hero for New York, scoring on a drive from the point that deflected off the iron and in behind Ryan Miller, ending the game after 36:43 of extra time. The win came 36 years to the day that Pete Stemkowski scored a triple overtime winner at the Garden to beat the Chicago Blackhawks in 1971.

Two days later, the Rangers looked to even up the series on home ice, taking momentum from their double overtime Game 3 victory. Game 4 started similarly: after a scoreless first period, Jaromir Jagr scored a goal early in the first minute of the second period to give the Rangers a 1–0 lead. The Rangers would extend their lead to 2–0 midway through the third period, thanks to a power play goal from Brendan Shanahan. Buffalo would cut their deficit back to one goal just 33 seconds later on a goal by Ales Kotalik. Buffalo attacked hard for the game's final ten minutes but Lundqvist kept the Rangers up by a goal. The Sabres outshot the Rangers 11–4 in the game's final frame. With 20 seconds to play in regulation, Lundqvist was caught out of the net after misplaying the puck behind his own net as Buffalo charged for the equalizer. The puck came to Daniel Briere at the side of the net, but Lundqvist came across and made a right pad save at the goal line with 17 seconds to play. The play would go to another controversial video review and while many analysts believe that the puck logically would have crossed the goal line (resulting in a goal), there was no video angle available to conclusively prove that point. The ruling was no goal and the Rangers hung on for their second straight 2–1 victory to even the series 2–2 as it went back to Buffalo.

After an even first period in Game 5 resulted in no scoring, the momentum swung heavily in the Sabres' favor. Buffalo outshot New York 17–6 in the second period, but both goaltenders were a wall in net and the game remained scoreless through two. In the third, Buffalo had the advantage in shots once more (13–6), but it was New York that struck first, as Martin Straka scored to put the Rangers on top 1–0 with 3:19 to play in regulation. The Rangers looked like they were about to steal Game 5, but Chris Drury scored with 7.7 seconds remaining in the game to force overtime. Coincidentally, the Rangers had been burned for a game-tying goal with exactly 7.7 seconds on the clock in the past, specifically in Game 7 of the 1994 Eastern Conference Finals when Valeri Zelepukin beat Mike Richter to force overtime. While the Rangers had won that game in double overtime on a Stephane Matteau wrap-around, in this case, the Sabres would ride their momentum and win four minutes into overtime on a power play goal by Maxim Afinogenov, who had been a healthy scratch the game before.

Down 3–2 in the series, the Rangers headed back to New York for Game 6, carrying a nine-game winning streak at Madison Square Garden. For the fifth straight game in the series, the Rangers drew first blood, on a Michael Nylander backhand shot. With the score 1–0 Rangers in the second period, Buffalo started a heavy offensive onslaught. 1:29 into the second, Dmitri Kalinin scored on a shot that changed directions on Lundqvist after forward Nigel Dawes attempted to block the shot. Buffalo took the lead just over a minute later on a Jason Pominville goal. The Rangers would respond quickly, thanks to a power play goal by Paul Mara to tie the score at 2, but the Sabres were not done. Jochen Hecht and Chris Drury would add goals to give Buffalo a 4–2 lead after two periods. During the regular season and playoffs to that point, the Sabres had a 40–0 record when leading by two goals after two periods, but the Rangers would challenge that early. Jaromir Jagr scored on the power play five minutes into the third to cut the deficit to 4–3, but Hecht would net his second of the game ten minutes later on a tip-in in front to extend Buffalo's lead back to two goals. With 2:51 to play, Michael Nylander would score his second of the game on the power play to cut it to one goal again, but the Rangers could not tie the game late, and Buffalo held on for a 5–4 victory to eliminate the Rangers in six games.

== Schedule and results ==
=== Regular season ===
2006–07 regular season
October: 5–6–0 (home: 2–4–0; road: 3–2–0)

Game	Date	Opponent	Score	Decision	Record	Recap
1	October 5	Washington Capitals	5–2	Lundqvist	1–0–0	W
2	October 7	@ Philadelphia Flyers	5–4 SO	Lundqvist	2–0–0	W
3	October 10	Philadelphia Flyers	4–2	Lundqvist	2–1–0	L
4	October 12	Pittsburgh Penguins	6–5	Lundqvist	2–2–0	L
5	October 14	@ Buffalo Sabres	7–4	Weekes	2–3–0	L
6	October 16	New Jersey Devils	4–2	Lundqvist	3–3–0	W
7	October 18	Nashville Predators	3–0	Lundqvist	3–4–0	L
8	October 21	@ Toronto Maple Leafs	5–4 SO	Lundqvist	4–4–0	W
9	October 25	Florida Panthers	4–2	Lundqvist	4–5–0	L
10	October 28	@ Phoenix Coyotes	7–3	Lundqvist	5–5–0	W
11	October 30	@ Los Angeles Kings	4–1	Lundqvist	5–6–0	L

November: 8–3–3 (home: 3–0–3; road: 5–3–0)

Game	Date	Opponent	Score	Decision	Record	Recap
12	November 1	@ Anaheim Ducks	4–3 OT	Weekes	6–6–0	W
13	November 2	@ San Jose Sharks	3–1	Weekes	7–6–0	W
14	November 5	Buffalo Sabres	4–3 OT	Weekes	7–6–1	OTL
15	November 8	@ Florida Panthers	4–3 SO	Lundqvist	8–6–1	W
16	November 10	@ Atlanta Thrashers	5–2	Lundqvist	9–6–1	W
17	November 11	@ Washington Capitals	3–1	Lundqvist	9–7–1	L
18	November 14	New Jersey Devils	3–2	Lundqvist	10–7–1	W
19	November 15	@ Carolina Hurricanes	2–1	Weekes	10–8–1	L
20	November 18	@ Pittsburgh Penguins	3–1	Lundqvist	10–9–1	L
21	November 19	Tampa Bay Lightning	4–1	Lundqvist	11–9–1	W
22	November 21	Carolina Hurricanes	4–0	Lundqvist	12–9–1	W
23	November 25	@ Pittsburgh Penguins	2–1 OT	Lundqvist	13–9–1	W
24	November 26	Buffalo Sabres	3–2 OT	Lundqvist	13–9–2	OTL
25	November 28	Atlanta Thrashers	5–4 OT	Lundqvist	13–9–3	OTL

December: 6–8–1 (home: 3–3–0; road: 3–5–1)

Game	Date	Opponent	Score	Decision	Record	Recap
26	December 1	@ Buffalo Sabres	4–3 SO	Weekes	13–9–4	OTL
27	December 3	New York Islanders	7–4	Weekes	13–10–4	L
28	December 7	Pittsburgh Penguins	3–2 SO	Lundqvist	14–10–4	W
29	December 9	@ Ottawa Senators	3–1	Lundqvist	15–10–4	W
30	December 10	Florida Panthers	2–1	Weekes	16–10–4	W
31	December 12	@ Philadelphia Flyers	3–1	Weekes	17–10–4	W
32	December 14	@ Dallas Stars	5–2	Lundqvist	18–10–4	W
33	December 16	@ Toronto Maple Leafs	9–2	Lundqvist	18–11–4	L
34	December 17	New Jersey Devils	6–1	Weekes	18–12–4	L
35	December 19	New York Islanders	4–3	Weekes	18–13–4	L
36	December 21	@ Florida Panthers	3–2	Weekes	18–14–4	L
37	December 23	@ Tampa Bay Lightning	4–3	Lundqvist	18–15–4	L
38	December 26	@ New York Islanders	2–0	Lundqvist	18–16–4	L
39	December 29	@ Ottawa Senators	1–0	Lundqvist	18–17–4	L
40	December 30	Washington Capitals	4–1	Lundqvist	19–17–4	W

January: 6–5–0 (home: 2–4–0; road: 4–1–0)

Game	Date	Opponent	Score	Decision	Record	Recap
41	January 2	@ New Jersey Devils	3–2 SO	Lundqvist	20–17–4	W
42	January 4	Philadelphia Flyers	3–2	Lundqvist	21–17–4	W
43	January 6	@ Montreal Canadiens	4–3	Lundqvist	22–17–4	W
44	January 9	New York Islanders	5–3	Lundqvist	22–18–4	L
45	January 11	Ottawa Senators	6–4	Lundqvist	22–19–4	L
46	January 13	Boston Bruins	3–1	Lundqvist	23–19–4	W
47	January 16	@ New Jersey Devils	1–0	Lundqvist	23–20–4	L
48	January 20	Atlanta Thrashers	3–1	Lundqvist	23–21–4	L
49	January 27	@ Philadelphia Flyers	2–1	Lundqvist	24–21–4	W
50	January 29	@ Boston Bruins	6–1	Lundqvist	25–21–4	W
51	January 31	Toronto Maple Leafs	2–1	Lundqvist	25–22–4	L

February: 5–5–2 (home: 3–3–1; road: 2–2–1)

Game	Date	Opponent	Score	Decision	Record	Recap
52	February 3	@ Tampa Bay Lightning	3–2	Lundqvist	25–23–4	L
53	February 5	Detroit Red Wings	4–3	Lundqvist	25–24–4	L
54	February 6	@ New Jersey Devils	3–2 SO	Lundqvist	25–24–5	OTL
55	February 9	Tampa Bay Lightning	5–0	Lundqvist	26–24–5	W
56	February 10	@ Washington Capitals	5–2	Lundqvist	27–24–5	W
57	February 15	@ Carolina Hurricanes	4–1	Lundqvist	28–24–5	W
58	February 17	Philadelphia Flyers	5–3	Valiquette	28–25–5	L
59	February 18	Chicago Blackhawks	2–1	Lundqvist	29–25–5	W
60	February 20	@ New Jersey Devils	2–1	Lundqvist	29–26–5	L
61	February 22	New Jersey Devils	3–2 SO	Lundqvist	29–26–6	OTL
62	February 24	Columbus Blue Jackets	3–2	Lundqvist	29–27–6	L
63	February 27	Montreal Canadiens	4–0	Lundqvist	30–27–6	W

March: 10–2–3 (home: 6–1–1; road: 4–1–2)

Game	Date	Opponent	Score	Decision	Record	Recap
64	March 1	Pittsburgh Penguins	4–3 SO	Lundqvist	30–27–7	OTL
65	March 3	St. Louis Blues	3–2 SO	Valiquette	31–27–7	W
66	March 5	New York Islanders	2–1 SO	Lundqvist	32–27–7	W
67	March 8	@ New York Islanders	2–1	Lundqvist	33–27–7	W
68	March 10	@ Pittsburgh Penguins	3–2 OT	Lundqvist	33–27–8	OTL
69	March 11	Carolina Hurricanes	2–1 SO	Lundqvist	34–27–8	W
70	March 13	Ottawa Senators	3–2	Lundqvist	34–28–8	L
71	March 16	@ Atlanta Thrashers	2–1 OT	Lundqvist	34–28–9	OTL
72	March 17	Boston Bruins	7–0	Lundqvist	35–28–9	W
73	March 19	Pittsburgh Penguins	2–1	Lundqvist	36–28–9	W
74	March 21	Philadelphia Flyers	5–0	Lundqvist	37–28–9	W
75	March 24	@ Boston Bruins	2–1 SO	Lundqvist	38–28–9	W
76	March 25	@ New York Islanders	2–1 OT	Lundqvist	39–28–9	W
77	March 27	@ Montreal Canadiens	6–4	Valiquette	39–29–9	L
78	March 31	@ Philadelphia Flyers	6–4	Lundqvist	40–29–9	W

April: 2–1–1 (home: 2–0–0; road: 0–1–1)

Game	Date	Opponent	Score	Decision	Record	Recap
79	April 1	Toronto Maple Leafs	7–2	Lundqvist	41–29–9	W
80	April 3	@ New York Islanders	3–2 SO	Lundqvist	41–29–10	OTL
81	April 5	Montreal Canadiens	3–1	Lundqvist	42–29–10	W
82	April 7	@ Pittsburgh Penguins	2–1	Lundqvist	42–30–10	L

Legend: W Win (2 points) L Loss (0 points) OTL Overtime/shootout loss (1 point)

=== Playoffs ===
2007 Stanley Cup playoffs
Eastern Conference Quarterfinals vs. (3) Atlanta Thrashers – Rangers win 4–0

Game	Date	Opponent	Score	Attendance	Series	Recap
1	April 12	Atlanta Thrashers	4–3	18,857	Rangers lead 1–0	W
2	April 14	Atlanta Thrashers	2–1	18,803	Rangers lead 2–0	W
3	April 17	@ Atlanta Thrashers	7–0	18,200	Rangers lead 3–0	W
4	April 18	@ Atlanta Thrashers	4–2	18,200	Rangers win 4–0	W

Eastern Conference Semifinals vs. (1) Buffalo Sabres – Sabres win 4–2

Game	Date	Opponent	Score	Attendance	Series	Recap
1	April 25	@ Buffalo Sabres	2–5	18,690	Sabres lead 1–0	L
2	April 27	@ Buffalo Sabres	2–3	18,690	Sabres lead 2–0	L
3	April 29	Buffalo Sabres	2–1 2OT	18,200	Sabres lead 2–1	W
4	May 1	Buffalo Sabres	2–1	18,200	Series tied 2–2	W
5	May 4	@ Buffalo Sabres	1–2 OT	18,690	Sabres lead 3–2	L
6	May 6	Buffalo Sabres	4–5	18,200	Sabres win 4–2	L

Legend: W Win L Loss

== Player statistics ==
=== Scoring ===
- Position abbreviations: C = Center; D = Defense; G = Goaltender; LW = Left wing; RW = Right wing
- † = Joined team via a transaction (e.g., trade, waivers, signing) during the season. Stats reflect time with the Rangers only.
- ‡ = Left team via a transaction (e.g., trade, waivers, release) during the season. Stats reflect time with the Rangers only.

No.	Player	Pos	Regular season						Playoffs					
No.	Player	Pos	GP	G	A	Pts	+/-	PIM	GP	G	A	Pts	+/-	PIM
68	Jaromir Jagr	RW	82	30	66	96	26	78	10	5	6	11	6	12
92	Michael Nylander	C	79	26	57	83	12	42	10	6	7	13	9	0
82	Martin Straka	C	77	29	41	70	16	24	10	2	8	10	0	2
14	Brendan Shanahan	LW	67	29	33	62	2	47	10	5	2	7	−5	12
5	Matt Cullen	C	80	16	25	41	0	52	10	1	3	4	−2	6
25	Petr Prucha	C	79	22	18	40	−7	30	10	0	1	1	0	4
3	Michal Rozsival	D	80	10	30	40	10	52	10	3	4	7	6	10
23	Karel Rachunek	D	66	6	20	26	−9	38	6	0	4	4	−1	2
8	Marek Malik	D	69	2	19	21	32	70	10	1	3	4	6	10
16	Sean Avery†	LW	29	8	12	20	11	58	10	1	4	5	−3	27
81	Marcel Hossa	LW	64	10	8	18	−4	26	10	2	2	4	5	4
51	Fedor Tyutin	D	66	2	12	14	−8	44	10	0	5	5	−3	8
19	Blair Betts	C	82	9	4	13	−4	24	10	0	0	0	−5	4
4	Aaron Ward‡	D	60	3	10	13	−3	57	—	—	—	—	—	—
18	Adam Hall‡	RW	49	4	8	12	−13	18	—	—	—	—	—	—
41	Jed Ortmeyer	RW	41	2	9	11	7	22	9	0	0	0	−1	2
16	Jason Ward‡	RW	46	4	6	10	−3	26	—	—	—	—	—	—
22	Thomas Pock	D	44	4	4	8	−4	16	4	0	3	3	0	4
43	Ryan Callahan	RW	14	4	2	6	5	9	10	2	1	3	1	6
38	Jarkko Immonen	C	14	1	5	6	−2	4	—	—	—	—	—	—
46	Daniel Girardi	D	34	0	6	6	7	8	10	0	0	0	−4	4
27	Paul Mara†	D	19	2	3	5	6	18	10	2	2	4	−4	18
15	Brad Isbister†	LW	19	1	4	5	5	14	4	0	0	0	−3	2
6	Darius Kasparaitis	D	24	2	2	4	−1	30	—	—	—	—	—	—
28	Colton Orr	RW	53	2	1	3	−2	126	4	0	0	0	−1	12
44	Ryan Hollweg	C	78	1	2	3	−11	131	2	0	0	0	−1	2
24	Sandis Ozolinsh	D	21	0	3	3	−8	8	—	—	—	—	—	—
20	Jason Krog†‡	C	9	2	0	2	2	4	—	—	—	—	—	—
10	Nigel Dawes	LW	8	1	0	1	−4	0	1	0	0	0	−2	0
61	Pascal Dupuis†‡	LW	6	1	0	1	−4	0	—	—	—	—	—	—
54	Brandon Dubinsky	C	6	0	0	0	0	2	—	—	—	—	—	—
26	Bryce Lampman	D	1	0	0	0	0	0	—	—	—	—	—	—
55	David Liffiton	D	2	0	0	0	1	7	—	—	—	—	—	—
30	Henrik Lundqvist	G	70	0	0	0		0	10	0	0	0		0
34	Jason Strudwick†	D	8	0	0	0	0	2	—	—	—	—	—	—
40	Steve Valiquette	G	3	0	0	0		0	—	—	—	—	—	—
80	Kevin Weekes	G	14	0	0	0		0	—	—	—	—	—	—

=== Goaltending ===
No.	Player	Regular season										Playoffs								
No.	Player	GP	W	L	OT	SA	GA	GAA	SV%	SO	TOI	GP	W	L	SA	GA	GAA	SV%	SO	TOI
30	Henrik Lundqvist	70	37	22	8	1927	160	2.34	.917	5	4109	10	6	4	291	22	2.07	.924	1	637
80	Kevin Weekes	14	4	6	2	355	43	3.39	.879	0	761	—	—	—	—	—	—	—	—	—
40	Steve Valiquette	3	1	2	0	45	6	3.13	.867	0	115	—	—	—	—	—	—	—	—	—

== Awards and records ==
=== Awards ===
Type	Award/honor	Recipient	Ref
League (annual)	Lester Patrick Trophy	John Halligan	
League (annual)	Lester Patrick Trophy	Brian Leetch	
League (in-season)	NHL All-Star Game selection	Brendan Shanahan	
League (in-season)	NHL First Star of the Week	Henrik Lundqvist (March 11)	
League (in-season)	NHL First Star of the Week	Henrik Lundqvist (March 25)	
League (in-season)	NHL Third Star of the Week	Brendan Shanahan (November 5)	
Team	Ceil Saidel Memorial Award	Brendan Shanahan	
Team	Frank Boucher Trophy	Henrik Lundqvist	
Team	Good Guy Award	Brendan Shanahan	
Team	Lars-Erik Sjoberg Award	Nigel Dawes	
Team	Lars-Erik Sjoberg Award	Brandon Dubinsky	
Team	Players' Player Award	Brendan Shanahan	
Team	Rangers MVP	Henrik Lundqvist	
Team	Rookie of the Year	Daniel Girardi	
Team	Steven McDonald Extra Effort Award	Jed Ortmeyer	

=== Milestones ===
On November 21, 2006, Jaromir Jagr scored his 602nd career goal to surpass Jari Kurri for most goals by a European-born player.

Milestone	Player	Date	Ref
First game	Nigel Dawes	October 5, 2006	
First game	Ryan Callahan	December 1, 2006	
First game	Daniel Girardi	January 27, 2007	
First game	Brandon Dubinsky	March 8, 2007	
600th goal	Brendan Shanahan	October 5, 2006	
600th goal	Jaromir Jagr	November 19, 2006	
1,500th point	Jaromir Jagr	February 10, 2007	

== Transactions ==
The Rangers were involved in the following transactions from June 20, 2006, the day after the deciding game of the 2006 Stanley Cup Finals, through June 6, 2007, the day of the deciding game of the 2007 Stanley Cup Finals.

=== Trades ===
Date	Details		Ref
June 24, 2006	To New York Rangers: 4th-round pick in 2006	To Los Angeles Kings: 4th-round pick in 2006; 5th-round pick in 2006	
June 24, 2006	To New York Rangers: Vancouver's 5th-round pick in 2006	To Washington Capitals: 4th-round pick in 2007	
July 19, 2006	To New York Rangers: Adam Hall	To Nashville Predators: Dominic Moore	
November 21, 2006	To New York Rangers: Brad Isbister	To Carolina Hurricanes: Rights to Jakub Petruzalek; Conditional 5th-round pick in 2008	
February 5, 2007	To New York Rangers: Sean Avery; Rights to John Seymour	To Los Angeles Kings: Jason Ward; Rights to Marc-Andre Cliche; Rights to Jan Marek	
February 9, 2007	To New York Rangers: Pascal Dupuis	To Minnesota Wild: Adam Hall	
February 27, 2007	To New York Rangers: Alex Bourret	To Atlanta Thrashers: Pascal Dupuis; 3rd-round pick in 2007	
February 27, 2007	To New York Rangers: Paul Mara	To Boston Bruins: Aaron Ward	
May 31, 2007	To New York Rangers: 7th-round pick in 2007	To Montreal Canadiens: Rights to Ryan Russell	

=== Players acquired ===
Date	Player	Former team	Term	Via	Ref
July 1, 2006	Matt Cullen	Carolina Hurricanes	4-year	Free agency	
July 1, 2006	Daniel Girardi	Hartford Wolf Pack (AHL)		Free agency	
July 1, 2006	Steve Valiquette	Lokomotiv Yaroslavl (RSL)		Free agency	
July 3, 2006	Aaron Ward	Carolina Hurricanes	2-year	Free agency	
July 9, 2006	Brendan Shanahan	Detroit Red Wings	1-year	Free agency	
January 12, 2007	Jason Krog	Atlanta Thrashers		Waivers	
March 19, 2007	Jason Strudwick	HC Lugano (NLA)		Free agency	
May 2, 2007	Michael Busto	Kootenay Ice (WHL)		Free agency	

=== Players lost ===
Date	Player	New team	Via (Note: In parentheses is the player's free agency group on July 1 if applicable.)	Ref
July 3, 2006	Steve Rucchin	Atlanta Thrashers	Free agency (III)	
July 8, 2006	Tom Poti	New York Islanders	Free agency (III)	
July 13, 2006	Martin Grenier	Philadelphia Flyers	Free agency (VI)	
July 14, 2006	Alexandre Giroux	Washington Capitals	Free agency (VI)	
July 14, 2006	Chad Wiseman	Washington Capitals	Free agency (VI)	
July 18, 2006	Martin Sonnenberg	KalPa (Liiga)	Free agency (VI)	
July 24, 2006	Joe Rullier	Vancouver Canucks	Free agency (VI)	
July 25, 2006	Fedor Fedorov	Lokomotiv Yaroslavl (RSL)	Free agency (VI)	
August 2, 2006	Martin Rucinsky	St. Louis Blues	Free agency (III)	
August 11, 2006	Petr Sykora	Edmonton Oilers	Free agency (III)	
September 12, 2006	Jason Strudwick	HC Lugano (NLA)	Free agency (III)	
October 4, 2006	Dale Purinton	Hartford Wolf Pack (AHL)	Free agency (III)	
February 27, 2007	Jason Krog	Atlanta Thrashers	Waivers	
June 5, 2007	Bryce Lampman	HC TPS (Liiga)	Free agency	

=== Signings ===
Date	Player	Term	Contract type	Ref
July 1, 2006	Karel Rachunek	1-year	Re-signing	
July 2, 2006	Martin Straka	1-year	Re-signing	
July 18, 2006	Bryce Lampman		Re-signing	
July 18, 2006	Jed Ortmeyer		Re-signing	
August 1, 2006	Michal Rozsival	2-year	Re-signing	
August 2, 2006	Fedor Tyutin	2-year	Re-signing	
August 3, 2006	Adam Hall		Re-signing	
August 7, 2006	Marcel Hossa		Re-signing	
August 8, 2006	Michael Sauer		Entry-level	
August 24, 2006	Thomas Pock		Re-signing	
January 4, 2007	Blair Betts	2-year	Extension	
January 17, 2007	Martin Straka	1-year	Extension	
March 12, 2007	Tom Pyatt		Entry-level	
April 20, 2007	Ryan Hollweg	1-year	Extension	
April 20, 2007	Colton Orr	1-year	Extension	
April 20, 2007	Thomas Pock	1-year	Extension	
April 20, 2007	Bobby Sanguinetti		Entry-level	
May 21, 2007	Brodie Dupont		Entry-level	

== Draft picks ==
New York's picks at the 2006 NHL entry draft in Vancouver, British Columbia, at the General Motors Place.

Round	#	Player	Position	Nationality	College/Junior/Club team (League)
1	21	Bob Sanguinetti	D	United States	Owen Sound Attack (OHL)
2	54	Artem Anisimov	C	Russia	Lokomotiv Yaroslavl (Russia)
3	84	Ryan Hillier	LW	Canada	Halifax Mooseheads (QMJHL)
4	104	David Kveton	RW	Czech Republic	HC Vsetín (Czech Republic)
5	137	Tomas Zaborsky	LW	Slovakia	Dukla Trenčín (Slovak Extraliga)
6	174	Eric Hunter	C	Canada	Prince George Cougars (WHL)
7	204	Lukas Zeliska	C	Slovakia	Oceláři Třinec Jr. (Czech Jr.)

== Farm teams ==
=== Hartford Wolf Pack (AHL) ===
Hartford finished with a regular season record of 47–29–3–1 for a total of 98 points in the standings. This snapped a three-year streak in which the team had finished the regular season with at least 100 points, though it marked the fourth consecutive season in which the Wolf Pack won at least 40 games. Ryan Callahan led the team with 35 goals and 55 points on the season, earning him a spot on the AHL All-Rookie team for the season. By the time Callahan had won the honor, however, he was already seeing 3rd line playing time in the NHL for the Rangers. Goaltender Al Montoya finished fifth in the league in regular season goals against average at 2.30.

==== Regular season standings ====
Atlantic Division	GP	W	L	OTL	SL	PTS	GF	GA
Manchester Monarchs (LA)	80	51	21	7	1	110	242	182
Hartford Wolf Pack (NYR)	80	47	29	3	1	98	231	201
Providence Bruins (Bos)	80	44	30	2	4	94	251	218
Worcester Sharks (SJ)	80	41	28	3	8	93	247	244
Lowell Devils (NJ)	80	38	30	6	6	88	212	220
Portland Pirates (Ana)	80	37	31	3	9	86	225	232
Springfield Falcons (TB)	80	28	49	1	2	59	181	268

==== Playoffs ====
As the second seed in the Atlantic Division, the Wolf Pack opened up the playoffs against the third seeded Providence Bruins. With home ice advantage secured, Hartford won Game 1, 5–1, but fell behind early in Game 2 and lost 4–2. With the series even and headed to Providence, the Wolf Pack reclaimed home ice advantage in the series thanks to a 5–2 victory in Game 3. Providence evened the series again in Game 4 with a big 5–1 victory, but the Wolf Pack used a 26–save Al Montoya shutout in Game 5 (a 1–0 victory) to take a 3–2 series lead back home to Hartford. Providence stayed alive in the series by winning Game 6 convincingly by a 5–2 score to force a seventh game. Tied 3–3 in the third, the Bruins scored two goals in a span of 58 seconds to take a 5–3 lead which Hartford could not come back from, falling 5–4 and losing the series 4 games to 3.

=== Charlotte Checkers (ECHL) ===
Charlotte finished the regular season 42–27–1–2 for 87 points, making 2006–07 the third best regular season finish in franchise history (behind 93 points in 2001–02 and 94 points in 1995–96). The Checkers also qualified for the playoffs for the third consecutive season. In each of the past two years, the Checkers were eliminated in the third round of the Kelly Cup Playoffs. Mark Lee led the team in scoring with 80 points, Bruce Graham led the team in goals with 33, and goaltender Chris Holt finished the season with a 24–18–0–2 record with a 3.15 goals against average.

==== Regular season standings ====
Southern Division	GP	W	L	OTL	SOL	PTS	GF	GA
Florida Everblades (Car/Fla)	72	44	22	4	2	94	272	212
Texas Wildcatters (Independent)	72	41	22	5	4	91	265	222
Gwinnett Gladiators (Atl)	72	41	24	5	2	89	289	256
Charlotte Checkers (NYR)	72	42	27	1	2	87	252	220
Augusta Lynx (Ana)	72	39	29	1	3	82	258	265
South Carolina Stingrays (Was)	72	36	27	4	5	81	250	251
Columbia Inferno (Tor)	72	29	34	4	5	67	217	256
Pensacola Ice Pilots (NYI)	72	20	46	2	4	46	233	318

==== Playoffs ====
The fourth seeded Checkers played the fifth seeded Augusta Lynx in the American Conference's Southern Divisional Quarterfinals, a best-of-three series, sweeping it 2 games to 0. Charlotte won both games in overtime, 2–1 in Game 1 and 3–2 on the road in Game 2. Daymen Rycroft scored the game-winning goal on both occasions.

The Checkers would then play the top seeded Florida Everblades in the Divisional Semifinals, a best-of-five series. Florida took Game 1 by the score of 3–2, then pounded the Checkers in Game 2 by scoring early and often, en route to a 7–2 win. Back home for Game 3, the Checkers could not stave off the sweep, falling 4–0 in their final game.

== See also ==
- 2006–07 NHL season
