= 2006–07 Montreal Canadiens season =

NHL hockey team season

2006–07 Montreal Canadiens
- Division: 4th Northeast
- Conference: 10th Eastern
- 2006–07 record: 42–34–6
- Home record: 26–12–3
- Road record: 16–22–3
- Goals for: 245
- Goals against: 256

Team information
- General manager: Bob Gainey; Pierre Gauthier (interim) (Note: Gauthier served as interim general manager from December 10 to January 1 while Gainey took a leave of absence following the death of his daughter.)
- Coach: Guy Carbonneau
- Captain: Saku Koivu
- Alternate captains: Alexei Kovalev (Feb.–Apr.); Craig Rivet (Oct.–Feb.); Sheldon Souray
- Arena: Bell Centre
- Average attendance: 21,273 (100.0%)
- Minor league affiliates: Hamilton Bulldogs; Cincinnati Cyclones

Team leaders
- Goals: Michael Ryder (30)
- Assists: Saku Koivu (53)
- Points: Saku Koivu (75)
- Penalty minutes: Sheldon Souray (135)
- Plus/minus: Alexander Perezhogin (+11)
- Wins: Cristobal Huet (19)
- Goals against average: Cristobal Huet (2.81)

The 2006–07 Montreal Canadiens season was the club's 98th season, 90th in the National Hockey League (NHL). The club finished fourth in the Northeast division and missed qualification for the playoffs for the first time since the 2002–03 season by two points after losing the final game of the regular season 6–5 against the Toronto Maple Leafs.

== Pre-season ==
The Canadiens were only minimally active in offseason transactions, with forwards Sergei Samsonov and Mike Johnson and defenceman Janne Niinimaa representing the only additions. Forwards Jan Bulis, Richard Zednik and Mike Ribeiro moved to other teams: Bulis via free agency to Vancouver, Zednik via a trade to Washington and Ribeiro via a trade to Dallas (for Niinimaa).

== Regular season ==
The club intended to build on a 2005–06 season in which it took the eventual Stanley Cup champion Carolina Hurricanes to six games in the first round of the playoffs. Behind the leadership of goaltender Cristobal Huet and captain Saku Koivu, the Canadiens poised themselves to join the elite of the Eastern Conference.

However, the team failed to keep its momentum for the whole season. Cristobal Huet's injury on February 15, 2007, forced the Canadiens to use backup goaltenders Jaroslav Halak and David Aebischer. Despite Halak's decent performance, the Canadiens could not clinch a playoff spot. They were eliminated on April 8 after a 6–5 loss against the Toronto Maple Leafs during the season's last game.

On January 9, 2007, the NHL announced that Sheldon Souray had been voted by the fans to start at defence in the 2007 All-Star Game in Dallas.

The Canadiens finished the regular season with the NHL's best power-play percentage, at 22.75% (86 for 378), and tied the Ottawa Senators for most shorthanded goals scored, with 17.

== Standings ==
Northeast Division
| No. | CR | | GP | W | L | OTL | GF | GA | Pts |
|---|---|---|---|---|---|---|---|---|---|
| 1 | 1 | **Buffalo Sabres** | 82 | 53 | 22 | 7 | 308 | 242 | 113 |
| 2 | 4 | **Ottawa Senators** | 82 | 48 | 25 | 9 | 288 | 222 | 105 |
| 3 | 9 | Toronto Maple Leafs | 82 | 40 | 31 | 11 | 258 | 269 | 91 |
| 4 | 10 | Montreal Canadiens | 82 | 42 | 34 | 6 | 245 | 256 | 90 |
| 5 | 13 | Boston Bruins | 82 | 35 | 41 | 6 | 219 | 289 | 76 |

Note: No. = Division rank, CR = Conference rank, W = Wins, L = Losses, T = Ties, GF = Goals For, GA = Goals Against, Pts = Points
Teams that qualified for the playoffs are highlighted in bold.

Eastern Conference
| R | | Div | GP | W | L | OTL | GF | GA | Pts |
|---|---|---|---|---|---|---|---|---|---|
| **1** | **P -** Buffalo Sabres | **NE** | **82** | **53** | **22** | **7** | **308** | **242** | 113 |
| **2** | **Y -** New Jersey Devils | **AT** | **82** | **49** | **24** | **9** | **216** | **201** | 107 |
| **3** | **Y -** Atlanta Thrashers | **SE** | **82** | **43** | **28** | **11** | **246** | **245** | 97 |
| **4** | **X -** Ottawa Senators | **NE** | **82** | **48** | **25** | **9** | **288** | **222** | 105 |
| **5** | **X -** Pittsburgh Penguins | **AT** | **82** | **47** | **24** | **11** | **277** | **246** | 105 |
| **6** | **X -** New York Rangers | **AT** | **82** | **42** | **30** | **10** | **242** | **216** | 94 |
| **7** | **X -** Tampa Bay Lightning | **SE** | **82** | **44** | **33** | **5** | **253** | **261** | 93 |
| **8** | **X -** New York Islanders | **AT** | **82** | **40** | **30** | **12** | **248** | **240** | 92 |
8.5
| 9 | Toronto Maple Leafs | NE | 82 | 40 | 31 | 11 | 258 | 269 | 91 |
| 10 | Montreal Canadiens | NE | 82 | 42 | 34 | 6 | 245 | 256 | 90 |
| 11 | Carolina Hurricanes | SE | 82 | 40 | 34 | 8 | 241 | 253 | 88 |
| 12 | Florida Panthers | SE | 82 | 35 | 31 | 16 | 247 | 257 | 86 |
| 13 | Boston Bruins | NE | 82 | 35 | 41 | 6 | 219 | 289 | 76 |
| 14 | Washington Capitals | SE | 82 | 28 | 40 | 14 | 235 | 286 | 70 |
| 15 | Philadelphia Flyers | AT | 82 | 22 | 48 | 12 | 214 | 303 | 56 |

Divisions: AT – Atlantic, NE – Northeast, SE – Southeast

P – Clinched Presidents Trophy; Y – Clinched division; X – Clinched playoff spot

== Schedule and results ==
2006–07 regular season
October: 6–2–3 (home: 3–1–2; road: 3–1–1)

| Game | Date | Visitor | Score | Home | OT | Decision | Attendance | Record | Points | Recap |
|---|---|---|---|---|---|---|---|---|---|---|
| 1 | October 6 | Montreal | 4–5 | Buffalo | SO | Huet | 18,690 | 0–0–1 | 1 | OTL |
| 2 | October 7 | Montreal | 3–2 | Toronto | SO | Aebischer | 19,353 | 1–0–1 | 3 | W |
| 3 | October 11 | Montreal | 3–1 | Philadelphia | | Aebischer | 19,256 | 2–0–1 | 5 | W |
| 4 | October 14 | Ottawa | 3–2 | Montreal | SO | Huet | 21,273 | 2–0–2 | 6 | OTL |
| 5 | October 17 | Calgary | 4–5 | Montreal | | Huet | 21,273 | 3–0–2 | 8 | W |
| 6 | October 18 | Montreal | 1–2 | Chicago | | Aebischer | 11,095 | 3–1–2 | 8 | L |
| 7 | October 21 | Colorado | 5–8 | Montreal | | Aebischer | 21,273 | 4–1–2 | 10 | W |
| 8 | October 23 | Buffalo | 4–1 | Montreal | | Huet | 21,273 | 4–2–2 | 10 | L |
| 9 | October 26 | Montreal | 3–2 | Boston | | Huet | 13,920 | 5–2–2 | 12 | W |
| 10 | October 28 | Toronto | 5–4 | Montreal | SO | Aebischer | 21,273 | 5–2–3 | 13 | OTL |
| 11 | October 31 | Ottawa | 2–4 | Montreal | | Aebischer | 21,273 | 6–2–3 | 15 | W |

November: 8–5–0 (home: 4–2–0; road: 4–3–0)

| Game | Date | Visitor | Score | Home | OT | Decision | Attendance | Record | Points | Recap |
|---|---|---|---|---|---|---|---|---|---|---|
| 12 | November 2 | Montreal | 4–0 | Carolina | | Huet | 6,486 | 7–2–3 | 17 | W |
| 13 | November 4 | New Jersey | 2–1 | Montreal | | Huet | 21,271 | 7–3–3 | 17 | L |
| 14 | November 7 | Edmonton | 2–3 | Montreal | SO | Aebischer | 21,273 | 8–3–3 | 19 | W |
| 15 | November 11 | Montreal | 1–5 | Toronto | | Aebischer | 19,501 | 8–4–3 | 19 | L |
| 16 | November 13 | Montreal | 6–3 | Ottawa | | Huet | 20,051 | 9–4–3 | 21 | W |
| 17 | November 15 | Montreal | 3–1 | Tampa Bay | | Huet | 19,920 | 10–4–3 | 23 | W |
| 18 | November 16 | Montreal | 1–5 | Florida | | Aebischer | 13,506 | 10–5–3 | 23 | L |
| 19 | November 18 | Atlanta | 1–3 | Montreal | | Huet | 21,273 | 11–5–3 | 25 | W |
| 20 | November 22 | Minnesota | 2–4 | Montreal | | Huet | 21,273 | 12–5–3 | 27 | W |
| 21 | November 24 | Montreal | 2–1 | Buffalo | OT | Huet | 18,690 | 13–5–3 | 29 | W |
| 22 | November 25 | Philadelphia | 4–2 | Montreal | | Aebischer | 21,273 | 13–6–3 | 29 | L |
| 23 | November 28 | Florida | 0–1 | Montreal | SO | Huet | 21,273 | 14–6–3 | 31 | W |
| 24 | November 30 | Montreal | 2–4 | Carolina | | Huet | 13,103 | 14–7–3 | 31 | L |

December: 8–4–2 (home: 5–1–1; road: 3–3–1)

| Game | Date | Visitor | Score | Home | OT | Decision | Attendance | Record | Points | Recap |
|---|---|---|---|---|---|---|---|---|---|---|
| 25 | December 2 | Toronto | 3–4 | Montreal | SO | Huet | 21,273 | 15–7–3 | 33 | W |
| 26 | December 4 | Boston | 6–5 | Montreal | | Aebischer | 21,273 | 15–8–3 | 33 | L |
| 27 | December 6 | Montreal | 1–2 | New Jersey | OT | Aebischer | 10,986 | 15–8–4 | 34 | OTL |
| 28 | December 7 | Montreal | 4–2 | NY Islanders | | Huet | 9,551 | 16–8–4 | 36 | W |
| 29 | December 9 | Buffalo | 3–2 | Montreal | SO | Huet | 21,273 | 16–8–5 | 37 | OTL |
| 30 | December 12 | Boston | 3–4 | Montreal | | Aebischer | 21,273 | 17–8–5 | 39 | W |
| 31 | December 14 | Tampa Bay | 2–4 | Montreal | | Huet | 21,273 | 18–8–5 | 41 | W |
| 32 | December 16 | Pittsburgh | 3–6 | Montreal | | Huet | 21,273 | 19–8–5 | 43 | W |
| 33 | December 19 | Montreal | 5–2 | Buffalo | | Huet | 18,690 | 20–8–5 | 45 | W |
| 34 | December 21 | Philadelphia | 2–4 | Montreal | | Aebischer | 21,273 | 21–8–5 | 47 | W |
| 35 | December 23 | Montreal | 2–4 | Boston | | Huet | 17,565 | 21–9–5 | 47 | L |
| 36 | December 27 | Montreal | 4–1 | Washington | | Huet | 15,609 | 22–9–5 | 49 | W |
| 37 | December 29 | Montreal | 1–3 | Florida | | Huet | 19,772 | 22–10–5 | 49 | L |
| 38 | December 30 | Montreal | 1–3 | Tampa Bay | | Huet | 21,120 | 22–11–5 | 49 | L |

January: 6–7–0 (home: 4–3–0; road: 2–4–0)

| Game | Date | Visitor | Score | Home | OT | Decision | Attendance | Record | Points | Recap |
|---|---|---|---|---|---|---|---|---|---|---|
| 39 | January 2 | Tampa Bay | 2–5 | Montreal | | Huet | 21,273 | 23–11–5 | 51 | W |
| 40 | January 4 | Montreal | 1–5 | Washington | | Huet | 11,287 | 23–12–5 | 51 | L |
| 41 | January 6 | NY Rangers | 4–3 | Montreal | | Aebischer | 21,273 | 23–13–5 | 51 | L |
| 42 | January 7 | New Jersey | 3–0 | Montreal | | Huet | 21,273 | 23–14–5 | 51 | L |
| 43 | January 9 | Atlanta | 2–4 | Montreal | | Huet | 21,273 | 24–14–5 | 53 | W |
| 44 | January 11 | Montreal | 4–2 | Philadelphia | | Aebischer | 19,411 | 25–14–5 | 55 | W |
| 45 | January 13 | Montreal | 3–8 | Ottawa | | Huet | 20,038 | 25–15–5 | 55 | L |
| 46 | January 15 | Montreal | 0–2 | Detroit | | Aebischer | 20,066 | 25–16–5 | 55 | L |
| 47 | January 16 | Vancouver | 4–0 | Montreal | | Huet | 21,273 | 25–17–5 | 55 | L |
| 48 | January 18 | Montreal | 4–1 | Atlanta | | Huet | 14,025 | 26–17–5 | 57 | W |
| 49 | January 20 | Buffalo | 3–4 | Montreal | | Huet | 21,273 | 27–17–5 | 59 | W |
| 50 | January 27 | Montreal | 1–4 | Toronto | | Huet | 19,508 | 27–18–5 | 59 | L |
| 51 | January 29 | Ottawa | 1–3 | Montreal | | Aebischer | 21,273 | 28–18–5 | 61 | W |

February: 5–9–1 (home: 3–5–0; road: 2–4–1)

| Game | Date | Visitor | Score | Home | OT | Decision | Attendance | Record | Points | Recap |
|---|---|---|---|---|---|---|---|---|---|---|
| 52 | February 1 | Montreal | 4–5 | Pittsburgh | SO | Aebischer | 17,132 | 28–18–6 | 62 | OTL |
| 53 | February 3 | NY Islanders | 4–2 | Montreal | | Huet | 21,273 | 28–19–6 | 62 | L |
| 54 | February 4 | Pittsburgh | 3–4 | Montreal | OT | Aebischer | 21,273 | 29–19–6 | 64 | W |
| 55 | February 6 | Carolina | 2–1 | Montreal | | Aebischer | 21,273 | 29–20–6 | 64 | L |
| 56 | February 8 | Montreal | 1–4 | Ottawa | | Huet | 19,915 | 29–21–6 | 64 | L |
| 57 | February 10 | Ottawa | 5–3 | Montreal | | Aebischer | 21,273 | 29–22–6 | 64 | L |
| 58 | February 13 | Florida | 1–0 | Montreal | | Huet | 21,273 | 29–23–6 | 64 | L |
| 59 | February 14 | Montreal | 2–5 | New Jersey | | Huet | 7,515 | 29–24–6 | 64 | L |
| 60 | February 17 | Carolina | 5–3 | Montreal | | Aebischer | 21,273 | 29–25–6 | 64 | L |
| 61 | February 18 | Montreal | 3–2 | Columbus | | Halak | 16,116 | 30–25–6 | 66 | W |
| 62 | February 20 | Washington | 3–5 | Montreal | | Halak | 21,273 | 31–25–6 | 68 | W |
| 63 | February 22 | Montreal | 6–5 | Nashville | SO | Halak | 15,808 | 32–25–6 | 70 | W |
| 64 | February 24 | Montreal | 2–3 | NY Islanders | | Halak | 16,234 | 32–26–6 | 70 | L |
| 65 | February 26 | Toronto | 5–4 | Montreal | | Aebischer | 21,273 | 33–26–6 | 72 | W |
| 66 | February 27 | Montreal | 0–4 | NY Rangers | | Halak | 18,200 | 33–27–6 | 72 | L |

March: 8–5–0 (home: 6–0–0; road: 2–5–0)

| Game | Date | Visitor | Score | Home | OT | Decision | Attendance | Record | Points | Recap |
|---|---|---|---|---|---|---|---|---|---|---|
| 67 | March 2 | Montreal | 5–8 | Buffalo | | Aebischer | 18,690 | 33–28–6 | 72 | L |
| 68 | March 3 | Montreal | 1–3 | Boston | | Halak | 17,565 | 33–29–6 | 72 | L |
| 69 | March 8 | Montreal | 2–6 | Atlanta | | Halak | 14,528 | 33–30–6 | 72 | L |
| 70 | March 10 | Montreal | 4–3 | St. Louis | | Aebischer | 19,421 | 34–30–6 | 74 | W |
| 71 | March 13 | NY Islanders | 3–5 | Montreal | | Aebischer | 21,273 | 35–30–6 | 76 | W |
| 72 | March 16 | Montreal | 3–6 | Pittsburgh | | Aebischer | 17,132 | 35–31–6 | 76 | L |
| 73 | March 17 | Toronto | 2–3 | Montreal | SO | Halak | 21,273 | 36–31–6 | 78 | W |
| 74 | March 20 | Boston | 0–1 | Montreal | | Halak | 21,273 | 37–31–6 | 80 | W |
| 75 | March 22 | Montreal | 6–3 | Boston | | Halak | 17,026 | 38–31–6 | 82 | W |
| 76 | March 24 | Washington | 1–4 | Montreal | | Halak | 21,273 | 39–31–6 | 84 | W |
| 77 | March 27 | Rangers | 4–6 | Montreal | | Halak | 21,273 | 40–31–6 | 86 | W |
| 78 | March 30 | Montreal | 2–5 | Ottawa | | Halak | 20,185 | 40–32–6 | 86 | L |
| 79 | March 31 | Buffalo | 3–4 | Montreal | | Halak | 21,273 | 41–32–6 | 88 | W |

April: 1–2–0 (home: 1–0–0; road: 0–2–0)

| Game | Date | Visitor | Score | Home | OT | Decision | Attendance | Record | Points | Recap |
|---|---|---|---|---|---|---|---|---|---|---|
| 80 | April 3 | Boston | 0–2 | Montreal | | Halak | 21,273 | 42–32–6 | 90 | W |
| 81 | April 5 | Montreal | 1–3 | NY Rangers | | Halak | 18,200 | 42–33–6 | 90 | L |
| 82 | April 7 | Montreal | 5–6 | Toronto | | Huet | 19,723 | 42–34–6 | 90 | L |

Legend: W Win (2 points) L Loss (0 points) OTL Overtime/shootout loss (1 point)

== Player statistics ==
=== Scoring ===
- Position abbreviations: C = Centre; D = Defence; G = Goaltender; LW = Left wing; RW = Right wing
- † = Joined team via a transaction (e.g., trade, waivers, signing) during the season. Stats reflect time with the Canadiens only.
- ‡ = Left team via a transaction (e.g., trade, waivers, release) during the season. Stats reflect time with the Canadiens only.

| No. | Player | Pos | Regular season | | | | | |
| No. | Player | Pos | GP | G | A | Pts | +/- | PIM |
|---|---|---|---|---|---|---|---|---|
| 11 | Saku Koivu | C | 81 | 22 | 53 | 75 | −21 | 74 |
| 44 | Sheldon Souray | D | 81 | 26 | 38 | 64 | −28 | 135 |
| 73 | Michael Ryder | RW | 82 | 30 | 28 | 58 | −25 | 60 |
| 79 | Andrei Markov | D | 77 | 6 | 43 | 49 | 2 | 56 |
| 35 | Tomas Plekanec | LW | 81 | 20 | 27 | 47 | 10 | 36 |
| 27 | Alexei Kovalev | RW | 73 | 18 | 29 | 47 | −19 | 78 |
| 21 | Chris Higgins | C | 61 | 22 | 16 | 38 | −11 | 26 |
| 32 | Mark Streit | D | 76 | 10 | 26 | 36 | −5 | 14 |
| 20 | Mike Johnson | RW | 80 | 11 | 20 | 31 | 6 | 40 |
| 84 | Guillaume Latendresse | RW | 80 | 16 | 13 | 29 | −20 | 47 |
| 15 | Sergei Samsonov | LW | 63 | 9 | 17 | 26 | −4 | 10 |
| 14 | Radek Bonk | C | 74 | 13 | 10 | 23 | 0 | 54 |
| 8 | Mike Komisarek | D | 82 | 4 | 15 | 19 | 7 | 96 |
| 52 | Craig Rivet‡ | D | 54 | 6 | 10 | 16 | −7 | 57 |
| 42 | Alexander Perezhogin | LW | 61 | 6 | 9 | 15 | 11 | 48 |
| 51 | Francis Bouillon | D | 62 | 3 | 11 | 14 | −10 | 52 |
| 40 | Maxim Lapierre | C | 46 | 6 | 6 | 12 | −7 | 24 |
| 46 | Andrei Kostitsyn | W | 22 | 1 | 10 | 11 | 3 | 6 |
| 22 | Steve Begin | C | 52 | 5 | 5 | 10 | −6 | 46 |
| 25 | Mathieu Dandenault | D | 68 | 2 | 6 | 8 | −8 | 40 |
| 57 | Garth Murray | C | 43 | 2 | 1 | 3 | −10 | 32 |
| 6 | Janne Niinimaa | D | 41 | 0 | 3 | 3 | −13 | 36 |
| 47 | Aaron Downey | RW | 21 | 1 | 0 | 1 | −6 | 48 |
| 41 | Jaroslav Halak | G | 16 | 0 | 1 | 1 | | 2 |
| 39 | Cristobal Huet | G | 42 | 0 | 1 | 1 | | 0 |
| 62 | Duncan Milroy | RW | 5 | 0 | 1 | 1 | −2 | 0 |
| 30 | David Aebischer | G | 32 | 0 | 0 | 0 | | 2 |
| 26 | Josh Gorges† | D | 7 | 0 | 0 | 0 | −1 | 0 |
| 59 | Mikhail Grabovski | C | 3 | 0 | 0 | 0 | −2 | 0 |

=== Goaltending ===
| No. | Player | Regular season | | | | | | | | | |
| No. | Player | GP | W | L | OT | SA | GA | GAA | SV% | SO | TOI |
|---|---|---|---|---|---|---|---|---|---|---|---|
| 39 | Cristobal Huet | 42 | 19 | 16 | 3 | 1280 | 107 | 2.81 | .916 | 2 | 2286 |
| 30 | David Aebischer | 32 | 13 | 12 | 3 | 929 | 93 | 3.17 | .900 | 0 | 1760 |
| 41 | Jaroslav Halak | 16 | 10 | 6 | 0 | 469 | 44 | 2.89 | .906 | 2 | 912 |

== Awards and records ==
=== Awards ===
| Type | Award/honour | Recipient | Ref |
|---|---|---|---|
| League (annual) | King Clancy Memorial Trophy | Saku Koivu | |
| League (in-season) | NHL All-Star Game selection | Cristobal Huet | |
| League (in-season) | NHL All-Star Game selection | Sheldon Souray (Note: Souray was voted to the starting lineup.) | |
| League (in-season) | NHL Third Star of the Month | Cristobal Huet (November) | |
| League (in-season) | NHL Third Star of the Week | Sheldon Souray (October 22) | |
| League (in-season) | NHL Third Star of the Week | Jaroslav Halak (March 25) | |
| Team | Jacques Beauchamp Molson Trophy | Mark Streit | |
| Team | Molson Cup | Cristobal Huet | |

=== Milestones ===
| Milestone | Player | Date | Ref |
|---|---|---|---|
| First game | Guillaume Latendresse | October 6, 2006 | |
| First game | Mikhail Grabovski | January 6, 2007 | |
| First game | Duncan Milroy | February 17, 2007 | |
| First game | Jaroslav Halak | February 18, 2007 | |

== Transactions ==
The Canadiens were involved in the following transactions from June 20, 2006, the day after the deciding game of the 2006 Stanley Cup Finals, through June 6, 2007, the day of the deciding game of the 2007 Stanley Cup Finals.

=== Trades ===
| Date | Details | | Ref |
|---|---|---|---|
| June 24, 2006 | To San Jose Sharks: 1st-round pick in 2006 | To Montreal Canadiens: 1st-round pick in 2006; 2nd-round pick in 2006 | |
| June 24, 2006 | To Philadelphia Flyers: 3rd-round pick in 2006; 4th-round pick in 2006 | To Montreal Canadiens: Chicago's 3rd-round pick in 2006 | |
| July 12, 2006 | To Washington Capitals: Richard Zednik | To Montreal Canadiens: 3rd-round pick in 2007 | |
| July 12, 2006 | To Phoenix Coyotes: 4th-round pick in 2007 | To Montreal Canadiens: Mike Johnson | |
| September 30, 2006 | To Dallas Stars: Mike Ribeiro; 6th-round pick in 2008 | To Montreal Canadiens: Janne Niinimaa; 5th-round pick in 2007 | |
| December 15, 2006 | To San Jose Sharks: Patrick Traverse | To Montreal Canadiens: Mathieu Biron | |
| February 25, 2007 | To San Jose Sharks: Craig Rivet; 5th-round pick in 2008 | To Montreal Canadiens: Josh Gorges; 1st-round pick in 2007 | |
| May 31, 2007 | To New York Rangers: 7th-round pick in 2007 | To Montreal Canadiens: Rights to Ryan Russell | |

=== Players acquired ===
| Date | Player | Former team | Term | Via | Ref |
|---|---|---|---|---|---|
| July 12, 2006 | Sergei Samsonov | Edmonton Oilers | 2-year | Free agency | |
| July 13, 2006 | Dan Jancevski | Dallas Stars | 1-year | Free agency | |
| September 28, 2006 | Patrick Traverse | San Jose Sharks | | Waivers | |
| February 27, 2007 | Michael Leighton | Philadelphia Flyers | | Waivers | |
| May 31, 2007 | Janne Lahti | HPK (Liiga) | 1-year | Free agency | |

=== Players lost ===
| Date | Player | New team | Via (Note: In parentheses is the player's free agency group on July 1 if applicable.) | Ref |
|---|---|---|---|---|
| July 13, 2006 | Raitis Ivanans | Los Angeles Kings | Free agency (UFA) | |
| July 21, 2006 | Pete Vandermeer | Washington Capitals | Free agency (III) | |
| July 24, 2006 | Jan Bulis | Vancouver Canucks | Free agency (III) | |
| September 7, 2006 | Olivier Michaud | Saint–Jean Chiefs (LNAH) | Free agency (UFA) | |
| September 19, 2006 | Todd Simpson | Hannover Scorpions (DEL) | Free agency (III) | |
| October 17, 2006 | Pierre Dagenais | Jokerit (Liiga) | Free agency (UFA) | |
| October 18, 2006 | Jeff Paul | Tilburg Trappers (NED) | Free agency (VI) | |
| October 26, 2006 | Johnathan Aitken | EC KAC (EBEL) | Free agency (UFA) | |

=== Signings ===
| Date | Player | Term | Contract type | Ref |
|---|---|---|---|---|
| June 25, 2006 | Cristobal Huet | 2-year | Re-signing | |
| June 29, 2006 | Jonathan Ferland | 1-year | Re-signing | |
| July 1, 2006 | Francis Bouillon | 3-year | Re-signing | |
| July 6, 2006 | Jean-Philippe Cote | 1-year | Re-signing | |
| July 6, 2006 | Mike Ribeiro | 1-year | Re-signing | |
| July 10, 2006 | Mathieu Aubin | 3-year | Entry-level | |
| July 10, 2006 | Matt D'Agostini | 3-year | Entry-level | |
| July 10, 2006 | Mikhail Grabovski | 2-year | Entry-level | |
| July 10, 2006 | Chris Higgins | 1-year | Re-signing | |
| July 10, 2006 | Mike Komisarek | 1-year | Re-signing | |
| July 12, 2006 | David Aebischer | 1-year | Re-signing | |
| July 13, 2006 | Andrew Archer | 1-year | Re-signing | |
| July 13, 2006 | Yann Danis | 1-year | Re-signing | |
| July 13, 2006 | Duncan Milroy | 1-year | Re-signing | |
| July 17, 2006 | Alexander Perezhogin | 1-year | Re-signing | |
| July 23, 2006 | Michael Ryder | 1-year | Re-signing | |
| August 9, 2006 | Ryan O'Byrne | 2-year | Entry-level | |
| September 29, 2006 | Guillaume Latendresse | 3-year | Entry-level | |
| May 8, 2007 | Mathieu Carle | 3-year | Entry-level | |
| May 26, 2007 | Sergei Kostitsyn | 3-year | Entry-level | |
| May 28, 2007 | Andrei Markov | 4-year | Extension | |
| May 31, 2007 | Ryan Russell | 3-year | Entry-level | |

== Draft picks ==
Montreal's picks at the 2006 NHL entry draft in Vancouver, British Columbia. The Canadiens had the 16th overall draft pick, which they traded to the San Jose Sharks for the 20th and 53rd overall picks.

| Round | # | Player | Nationality | NHL team | College/junior/club team (league) |
|---|---|---|---|---|---|
| 1 | 20 | David Fischer (D) | United States | Montreal Canadiens (from San Jose) | Apple Valley High School (MSHSL) |
| 2 | 49 | Ben Maxwell (C) | Canada | Montreal Canadiens | Kootenay Ice (WHL) |
| 2 | 53 | Mathieu Carle (D) | Canada | Montreal Canadiens (from San Jose) | Acadie-Bathurst Titan (QMJHL) |
| 3 | 66 | Ryan White (C) | Canada | Montreal Canadiens (from Chicago) | Calgary Hitmen (WHL) |
| 5 | 139 | Pavel Valentenko (D) | Russia | Montreal Canadiens | Neftekhimik Nizhnekamsk (Russian Superleague) |
| 7 | 199 | Cameron Cepek (D) | United States | Montreal Canadiens | Portland Winterhawks (WHL) |

== See also ==
- 2006–07 NHL season
