= Andreas Karlsson =

Swedish ice hockey player

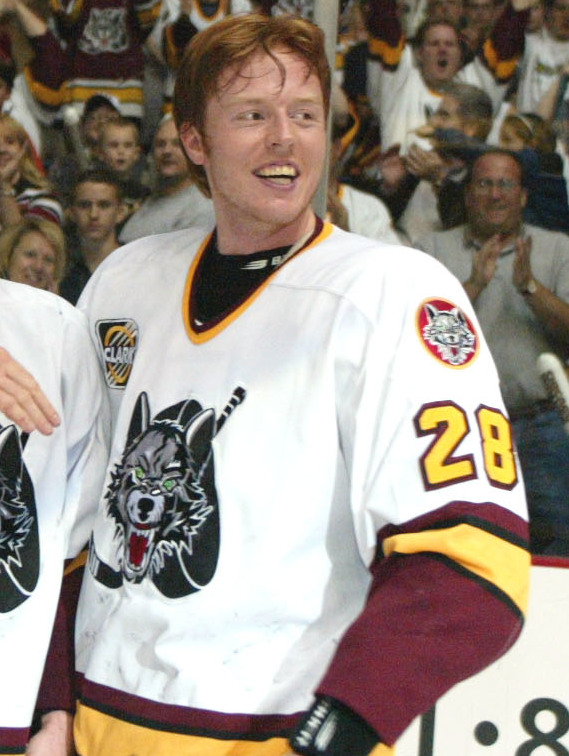
- Karlsson with the Chicago Wolves in 2002
- Born: August 19, 1975 (age 51) Ludvika, Sweden
- Height: 6 ft 4 in (193 cm)
- Weight: 205 lb (93 kg; 14 st 9 lb)
- Position: Centre
- Shot: Left
- Played for: Leksands IF; Atlanta Thrashers; EHC Basel; HV71; Tampa Bay Lightning; Frölunda HC
- National team: Sweden
- NHL draft: 148th overall, 1993; Calgary Flames
- Playing career: 1992–2011

Andreas Karlsson
Medal record

Men's ice hockey

World Championships
Gold medal – first place	2006	Team

Andreas John Karlsson (born August 19, 1975) is a Swedish former professional ice hockey player.

== Playing career ==
Karlsson had good technical skills. During the season 2005–06, he showed that he was an efficient goal scorer. He was sometimes called "Pastorn", which is Swedish for "the Pastor".

He played his first international game with Team Sweden on December 16, 1995, against Czech Republic in Helsinki, Finland. Karlsson was drafted by Calgary Flames with their 6th pick, 148th overall, in the 1993 NHL entry draft. He played for Atlanta Thrashers, Orlando Solar Bears, and Chicago Wolves in the United States.

In 2006, Karlsson signed a one-year contract with Tampa Bay Lightning in the NHL, as their third-line center with both scoring and defensive capabilities. After two seasons, totalling 13 points in 111 regular season games, he returned to his native Sweden and signed a three-year deal with Frölunda HC in Elitserien.

== Coaching career ==
- Frölunda Indians Under-20 juniors
- Assistant Coach 2011–12
- Head Coach 2012–present

Frölunda Indians

He joined the coaching staff at York University for the 2015–16 season.

== Awards ==
- TV-pucken champion with Dalarna in 1990.
- Baltica Brewery Cup's Best forward in 1998.
- Calder Cup winner with the Chicago Wolves in 2002.
- Awarded the Håkan Loob Trophy (Most goals scored in Elitserien) in 2006.
- Awarded Guldhjälmen (Elitserien's Most Valuable Player) in 2006.
- Gold medal at the Ice Hockey World Championship in 2006.
- Named to the Swedish All-Star Team in 2006.

== Records ==
- Elitserien regular season 2005–06 record for points (55)
- Elitserien regular season 2005–06 record for goals (26) -- (Shared with Tomi Kallio)

== Career statistics ==
=== Regular season and playoffs ===
			Regular season					Playoffs
Season	Team	League	GP	G	A	Pts	PIM	GP	G	A	Pts	PIM
1992–93	Leksands IF	SEL	13	0	0	0	2	—	—	—	—	—
1993–94	Leksands IF	SEL	21	0	0	0	10	3	0	0	0	0
1994–95	Leksands IF	SEL	22	7	8	15	2	4	0	1	1	0
1995–96	Leksands IF	SEL	40	10	13	23	10	5	2	1	3	4
1996–97	Leksands IF	SEL	49	13	11	24	39	9	2	0	2	2
1997–98	Leksands IF	SEL	33	9	14	23	20	4	1	0	1	0
1998–99	Leksands IF	SEL	49	18	15	33	18	4	1	0	1	6
1999–2000	Orlando Solar Bears	IHL	18	5	5	10	0	—	—	—	—	—
1999–2000	Atlanta Thrashers	NHL	51	5	9	14	14	—	—	—	—	—
2000–01	Atlanta Thrashers	NHL	60	5	11	16	16	—	—	—	—	—
2001–02	Atlanta Thrashers	NHL	42	1	7	8	20	—	—	—	—	—
2001–02	Chicago Wolves	AHL	16	6	14	20	11	23	7	14	21	6
2002–03	Chicago Wolves	AHL	41	12	20	32	16	9	1	3	4	4
2003–04	EHC Basel	NLA	40	7	20	27	30	—	—	—	—	—
2004–05	HV71	SEL	39	11	13	24	12	—	—	—	—	—
2005–06	HV71	SEL	50	26	29	55	30	12	5	8	13	8
2006–07	Tampa Bay Lightning	NHL	53	3	6	9	12	5	0	0	0	0
2007–08	Tampa Bay Lightning	NHL	58	2	2	4	10	—	—	—	—	—
2008–09	Frölunda HC	SEL	11	3	5	8	6	—	—	—	—	—
2009–10	Frölunda HC	SEL	15	3	3	6	6	7	1	5	6	2
SEL totals			342	100	111	211	155	48	12	15	27	22
NHL totals			264	16	35	51	72	6	0	0	0	0
AHL totals			57	18	34	52	27	31	8	17	25	10

=== International ===
Year	Team	Event	GP	G	A	Pts	PIM
1993	Sweden	EJC	4	1	3	4	0
1995	Sweden	WJC	7	2	2	4	0
1996	Sweden	WC	5	0	0	0	4
2006	Sweden	WC	9	5	4	9	6
Junior totals			11	3	5	8	0
Senior totals			14	5	4	9	10

Statistics as of April 13, 2006
