= List of New Jersey Devils award winners =

New Jersey Devils awards
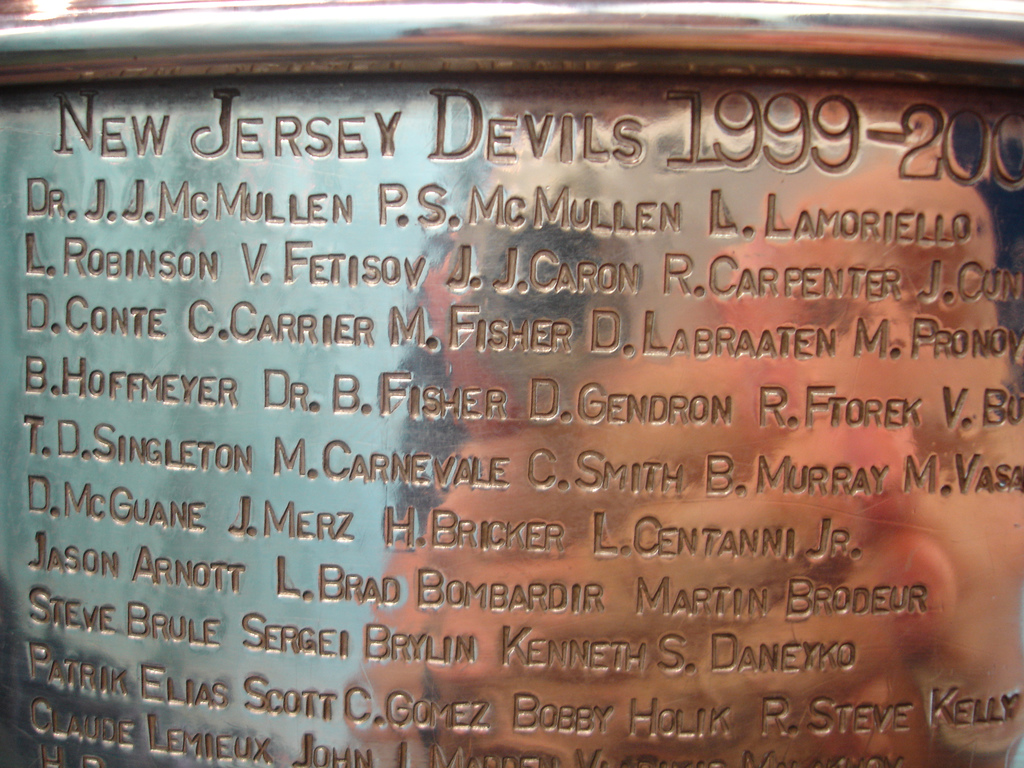
- The engraved names of the 1999–2000 New Jersey Devils on the Stanley Cup.

Team trophies
- Award*: Wins
- Stanley Cup: 3
- Prince of Wales Trophy: 5

Individual awards
- Award*: Wins
- Bill Masterton Memorial Trophy: 2
- Calder Memorial Trophy: 2
- Conn Smythe Trophy: 2
- Frank J. Selke Trophy: 1
- Hart Memorial Trophy: 1
- Jack Adams Award: 1
- James Norris Memorial Trophy: 1
- King Clancy Memorial Trophy: 1
- Lester Patrick Trophy: 4
- NHL Plus-Minus Award: 2
- Vezina Trophy: 4
- William M. Jennings Trophy: 5

Total
- Awards won: 34

The New Jersey Devils are an American professional ice hockey team based in Newark, New Jersey. They are members of the Metropolitan Division of the Eastern Conference in the National Hockey League (NHL). The Devils entered the League as the Kansas City Scouts in 1974. After just two years in Kansas City, they moved to Denver, Colorado, where they were known as the Colorado Rockies. In 1982, the team moved again to New Jersey. They currently play their home games at the Prudential Center.

The franchise and its members have won numerous team and individual awards and honors. They have captured the Prince of Wales Trophy as the Eastern Conference playoff champion five times, while they have also won Stanley Cup three times, in 1995, 2000 and 2003. Former goaltender Martin Brodeur is the team's most decorated player, having won the Vezina Trophy four times and the William M. Jennings Trophy five times, and the Calder Memorial Trophy once, along with several selections to the NHL First and second All-Star teams. Scott Stevens played in ten NHL All-Star Games, more than any player in team history. Taylor Hall is the only player in franchise history to have won the Hart Memorial Trophy.

Five players have had their numbers retired by the team. Patrik Elias the most recent, having his no. 26 retired on February 24, 2018. Brodeur's no. 30 in 2016, Stevens' no. 4 and Ken Daneyko's no. 3 were removed from circulation in 2006, while Scott Niedermayer's no. 27 was retired in 2011. Stevens, Niedermayer and Brodeur are some of several Hockey Hall of Famers who were associated with the Devils. Joe Nieuwendyk, Brendan Shanahan, Doug Gilmour, Dave Andreychuk, Peter Stastny, Viacheslav Fetisov and Igor Larionov each spent time in New Jersey during their Hall of Fame careers, while head coach Herb Brooks and general manager Lou Lamoriello have been inducted as builders. Longtime broadcaster Mike Emrick was enshrined in 2009 as a "Media honoree."

The Devils have four internal team awards. The Three-Star Award is awarded to the player who earns the most three-star selections throughout the season, while the Hugh Delano Unsung Hero, the Devils' Players' Player, and the Most Valuable Devil awards are presented towards the end of each season.

== League awards ==
=== Team trophies ===
The Devils have won the Eastern (previously the Wales) Conference five times in franchise history, and have won the Stanley Cup three times, most recently in 2003.

Team trophies awarded to the New Jersey Devils
Award	Description	Times won	Seasons	References
Stanley Cup	NHL championship	3	1994–95, 1999–2000, 2002–03	
Prince of Wales Trophy	Eastern Conference playoff championship	5	1994–95, 1999–2000, 2000–01, 2002–03, 2011–12	

=== Individual awards ===
Martin Brodeur is the Devils' most decorated player. He has won the Vezina Trophy four times and the Jennings Trophy five times. He has also won the Calder Memorial Trophy as the NHL rookie of the year, and has made the First or second All-Star team seven times.

Former Devils' captain Scott Stevens earned several honors during his tenure with the team. He was named to four All-Star teams, and led the league in plus-minus during the 1993–94 season. Scott Niedermayer won the James Norris Memorial Trophy as the league's best defenseman in 2004, and was a member of three All-Star teams, including the NHL All-Rookie Team.

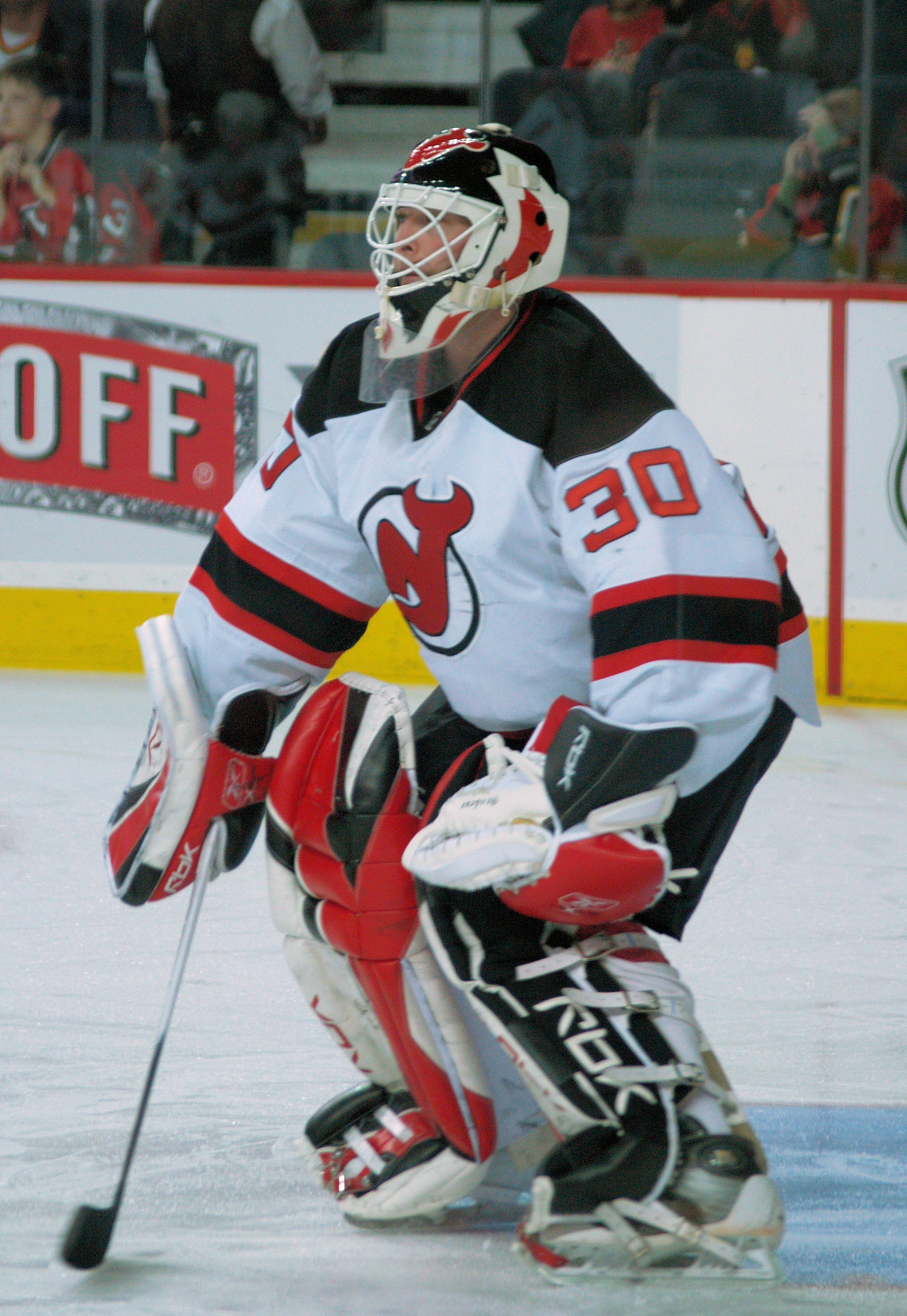
Martin Brodeur is the most decorated Devil in franchise history.

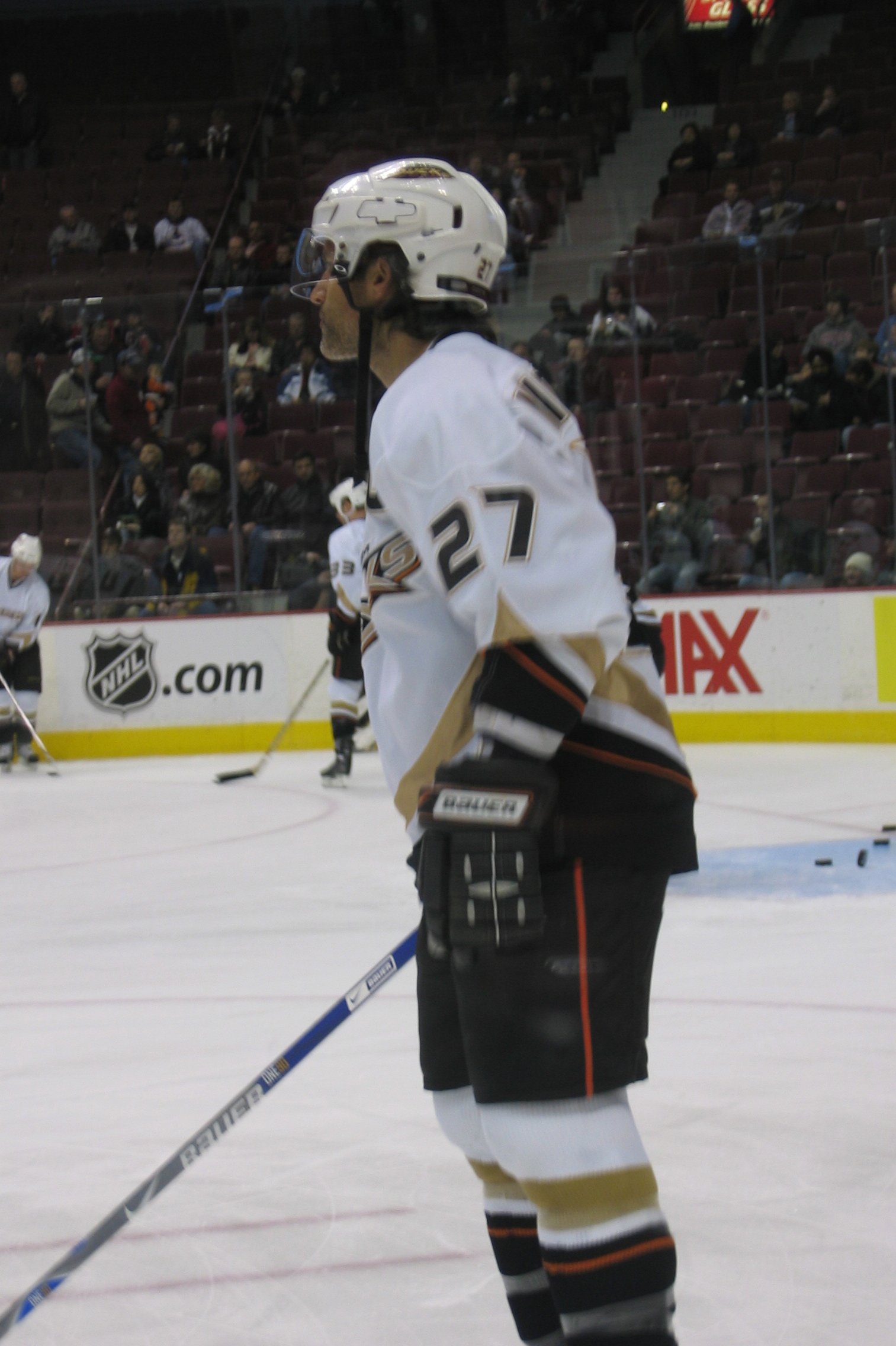
Scott Niedermayer, shown here with the Anaheim Ducks, is the only Devil to win the Norris Trophy.

Individual awards won by New Jersey Devils players and staff
Award	Description	Winner	Season	References
Bill Masterton Memorial Trophy	Perseverance, sportsmanship, and dedication to hockey	Ken Daneyko	1999–2000	
Bill Masterton Memorial Trophy	Perseverance, sportsmanship, and dedication to hockey	Brian Boyle	2017–18	
Calder Memorial Trophy	Rookie of the year	Martin Brodeur	1993–94	
Calder Memorial Trophy	Rookie of the year	Scott Gomez	1999–2000	
Conn Smythe Trophy	Most valuable player of the playoffs	Claude Lemieux	1994–95	
Conn Smythe Trophy	Most valuable player of the playoffs	Scott Stevens	1999–2000	
E.J. McGuire Award of Excellence	Prospect who best exemplifies character, competitiveness and athleticism.	Nico Hischier	2017–18	
Frank J. Selke Trophy	Forward who best excels in the defensive aspect of the game	John Madden	2000–01	
Hart Memorial Trophy	Most valuable player to his team during the regular season	Taylor Hall	2017–18	
Jack Adams Award	Top coach during the regular season	Jacques Lemaire	1993–94	
James Norris Memorial Trophy	Top defenseman during the regular season	Scott Niedermayer	2003–04	
King Clancy Memorial Trophy	Leadership qualities on and off the ice and humanitarian contributions within their community	P. K. Subban	2021–22	
NHL Plus-Minus Award	Highest plus/minus	Scott Stevens	1993–94	
NHL Plus-Minus Award	Highest plus/minus	Patrik Elias	2000–01	
Vezina Trophy	Top goaltender	Martin Brodeur	2002–03	
Vezina Trophy	Top goaltender	Martin Brodeur	2003–04	
Vezina Trophy	Top goaltender	Martin Brodeur	2006–07	
Vezina Trophy	Top goaltender	Martin Brodeur	2007–08	
William M. Jennings Trophy	Fewest goals given up in the regular season	Martin Brodeur	1996–97	
William M. Jennings Trophy	Fewest goals given up in the regular season	Mike Dunham	1996–97	
William M. Jennings Trophy	Fewest goals given up in the regular season	Martin Brodeur	1997–98	
William M. Jennings Trophy	Fewest goals given up in the regular season	Martin Brodeur	2002–03 (Note: Shared with Roman Cechmanek and Robert Esche of the Philadelphia Flyers.)	
William M. Jennings Trophy	Fewest goals given up in the regular season	Martin Brodeur	2003–04	
William M. Jennings Trophy	Fewest goals given up in the regular season	Martin Brodeur	2009–10	

== All-Stars ==
=== NHL first and second team All-Stars ===
The NHL first and second team All-Stars are the top players at each position as voted on by the Professional Hockey Writers' Association.

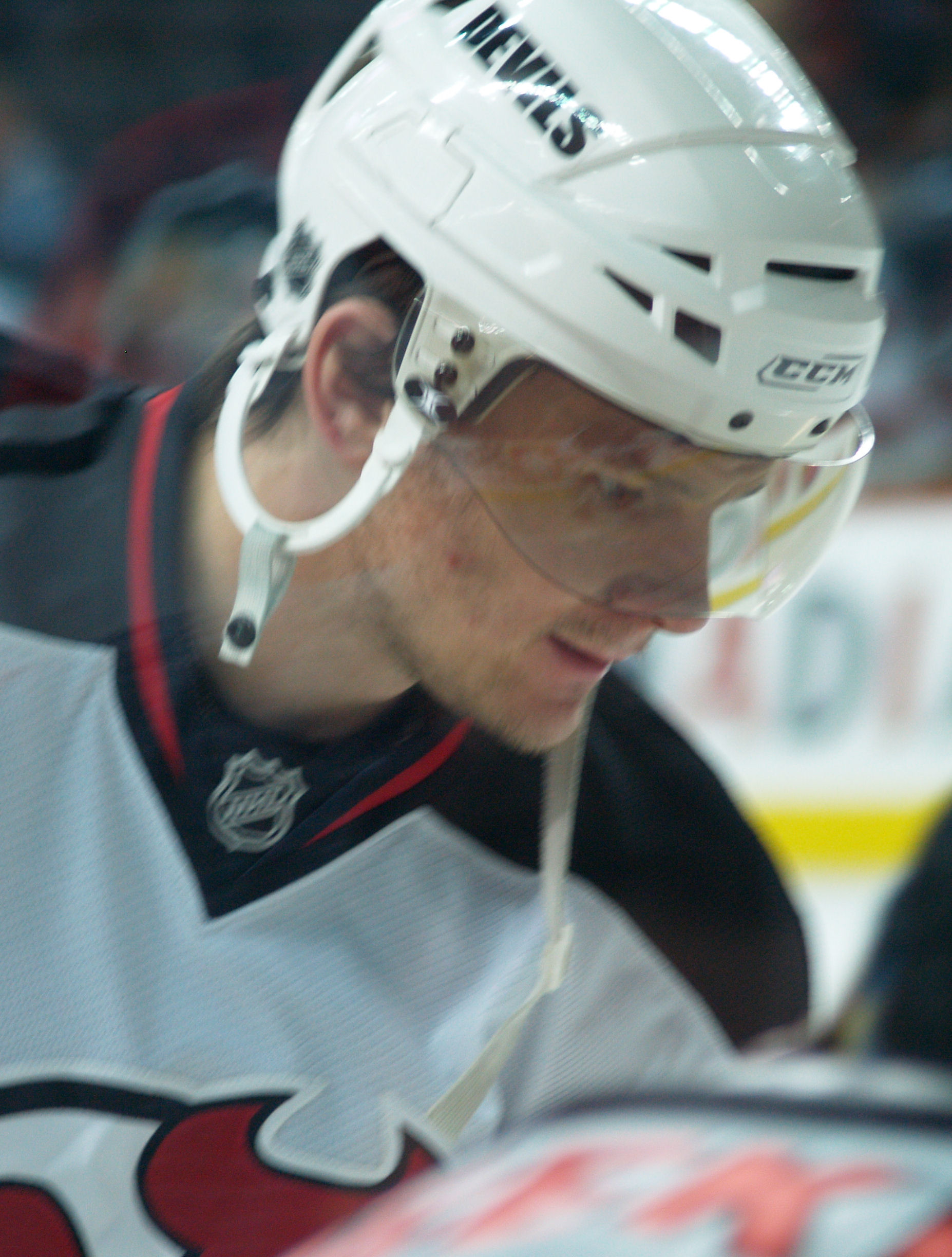
Patrik Elias made the first All-Star team in 2000–01.

New Jersey Devils selected to the NHL First and Second Team All-Stars
Player	Position	Selections	Season	Team
Martin Brodeur	Goaltender	7	1996–97	2nd
Martin Brodeur	Goaltender	7	1997–98	2nd
Martin Brodeur	Goaltender	7	2002–03	1st
Martin Brodeur	Goaltender	7	2003–04	1st
Martin Brodeur	Goaltender	7	2005–06	2nd
Martin Brodeur	Goaltender	7	2006–07	1st
Martin Brodeur	Goaltender	7	2007–08	2nd
Patrik Elias	Left wing	1	2000–01	1st
Taylor Hall	Left wing	1	2017–18	1st
Ilya Kovalchuk	Left wing	1	2011–12	1st
Scott Niedermayer	Defense	2	1997–98	2nd
Scott Niedermayer	Defense	2	2003–04	1st
Zach Parise	Left wing	1	2008–09	2nd
Scott Stevens	Defense	4	1991–92	2nd
Scott Stevens	Defense	4	1993–94	1st
Scott Stevens	Defense	4	1996–97	2nd
Scott Stevens	Defense	4	2000–01	2nd

=== NHL All-Rookie Team ===
The NHL All-Rookie Team consists of the top rookies at each position as voted on by the Professional Hockey Writers' Association.

New Jersey Devils selected to the NHL All-Rookie Team
Player	Position	Season
Martin Brodeur	Goaltender	1993–94
Will Butcher	Defense	2017–18
Patrik Elias	Forward	1997–98
Scott Gomez	Forward	1999–2000
Adam Henrique	Forward	2011–12
Luke Hughes	Defense	2023–24
Scott Niedermayer	Defense	1992–93
Brian Rafalski	Defense	1999–2000
Ty Smith	Defense	2020–21
Petr Sykora	Forward	1995–96
Kevin Todd	Forward	1991–92
Eric Weinrich	Defense	1990–91
Colin White	Defense	2000–01

=== All-Star Game selections ===
The National Hockey League All-Star Game is a mid-season exhibition game held annually between many of the top players of each season. Thirty All-Star Games have been held since the Devils arrived in New Jersey, with at least one player representing the Devils in each year. In total, 21 players have been selected to represent the Devils during the competition. The All-Star game has not been held in various years: 1979 and 1987 due to the 1979 Challenge Cup and Rendez-vous '87 series between the NHL and the Soviet national team, respectively, 1995, 2005, and 2013 as a result of labor stoppages, 2006, 2010, 2014 and 2026 due to the Winter Olympic Games, 2021 as a result of the COVID-19 pandemic, and 2025 when it was replaced by the 2025 4 Nations Face-Off.

The Devils hosted the 1984 All-Star Game at the Meadowlands Arena. The Wales Conference defeated the Campbell Conference 7–6; Devils goaltender Glenn Resch got the win for the Wales, while defenseman Joe Cirella added a goal and an assist. Scott Stevens was named to 11 All-Star games, and played in ten, both team records. Devils coaches Jacques Lemaire, Robbie Ftorek and Larry Robinson have all served as coaches for All-Star teams.

During All-Star Weekend, the NHL also holds a YoungStars Game for first- and second-year players. The Devils have sent three players: Paul Martin, Zach Parise and David Clarkson. Two others, Adam Henrique and Adam Larsson, were selected in 2012 but did not attend due to injuries. Parise was the MVP of the 2007 game, after scoring two goals and four assists. Defenseman Scott Niedermayer has also won the Fastest Skater event during the SuperSkills Competition twice, in 1998 and 2004.

- † Selected by fan vote

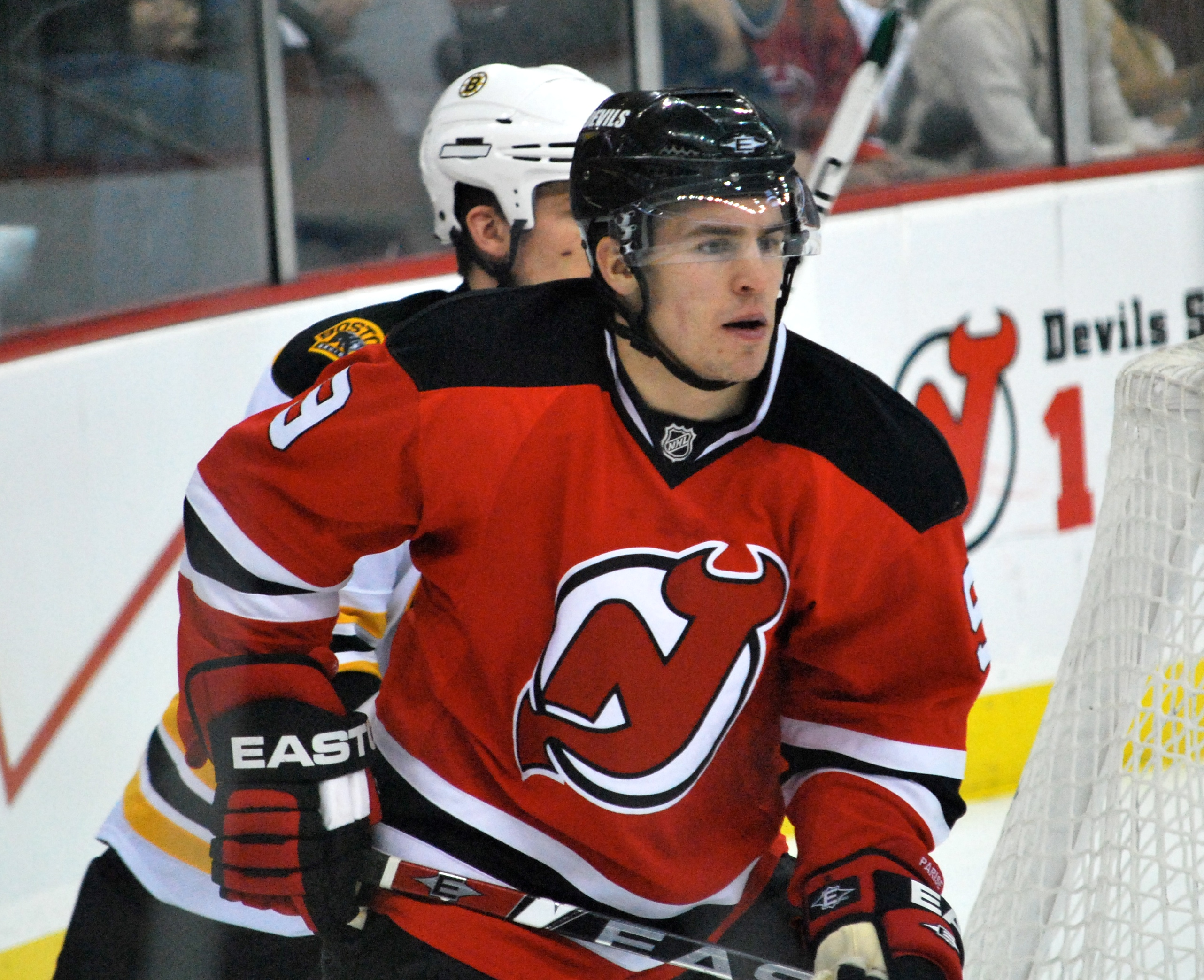
Zach Parise was the MVP of the 2007 YoungStars game.

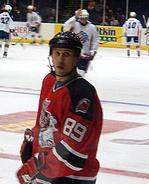
Alexander Mogilny was selected for the 2001 All-Star game, but did not play due to injury.

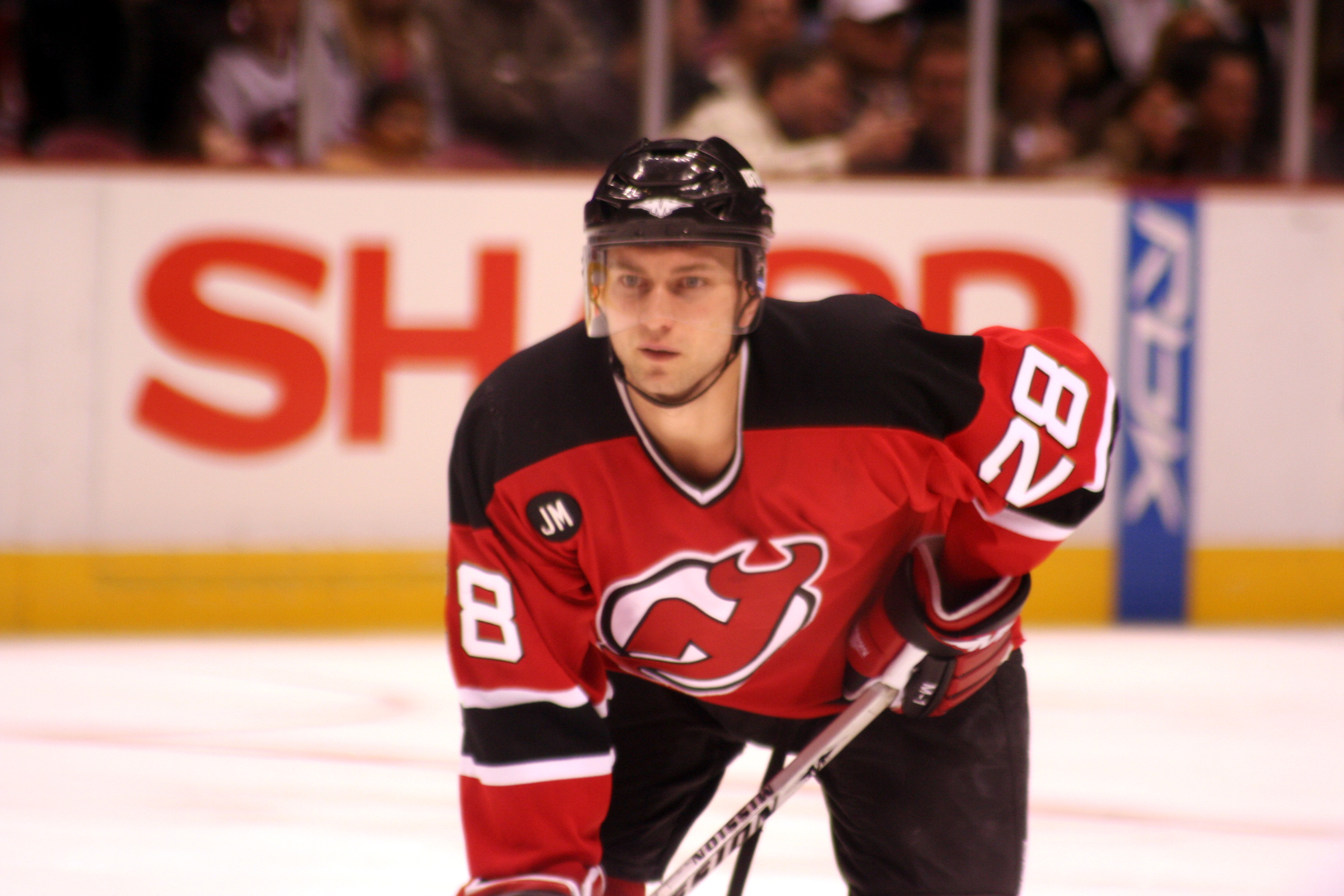
Brian Rafalski was selected to three All-Star games as a member of the Devils.

New Jersey Devils franchise players and coaches selected to the All-Star Game
Game	Year	Name	Position	References
28th	1975	Simon Nolet	Right wing	
29th	1976	Wilf Paiement	Right wing	
30th	1977	Wilf Paiement	Right wing	
31st	1978	Barry Beck	Defense	
31st	1978	Wilf Paiement	Right wing	
32nd	1980	Mike McEwen	Defense	
33rd	1981	Rob Ramage	Defense	
34th	1982	Don Lever	Center	
35th	1983	Hector Marini	Right wing	
36th	1984	Joe Cirella	Defense	
36th	1984	Glenn Resch	Goaltender	
37th	1985	Kirk Muller	Center	
37th	1985	Phil Russell	Defense	
38th	1986	Kirk Muller	Center	
39th	1988	Kirk Muller	Center	
40th	1989	Sean Burke†	Goaltender	
40th	1989	John MacLean	Right wing	
41st	1990	Kirk Muller	Center	
42nd	1991	John MacLean	Right wing	
43rd	1992	Scott Stevens	Defense	
44th	1993	Craig Billington	Goaltender	
44th	1993	Scott Stevens	Defense	
45th	1994	Scott Stevens	Defense	
46th	1996	Martin Brodeur†	Goaltender	
46th	1996	Scott Stevens†	Defense	
47th	1997	Martin Brodeur	Goaltender	
47th	1997	Scott Stevens	Defense	
48th	1998	Martin Brodeur	Goaltender	
48th	1998	Bobby Holik	Center	
48th	1998	Jacques Lemaire	Coach	
48th	1998	Scott Niedermayer	Defense	
48th	1998	Scott Stevens	Defense	
49th	1999	Martin Brodeur†	Goaltender	
49th	1999	Robbie Ftorek	Assistant coach	
49th	1999	Bobby Holik	Center	
49th	1999	Scott Stevens	Defense	
50th	2000	Martin Brodeur	Goaltender	
50th	2000	Patrik Elias	Left wing	
50th	2000	Robbie Ftorek	Assistant coach	
50th	2000	Scott Gomez	Center	
50th	2000	Scott Stevens	Defense	
51st	2001	Martin Brodeur	Goaltender	
51st	2001	Alexander Mogilny (did not play)	Right wing	
51st	2001	Scott Niedermayer	Defense	
51st	2001	Larry Robinson	Assistant coach	
51st	2001	Scott Stevens	Defense	
52nd	2002	Patrik Elias	Left wing	
52nd	2002	Brian Rafalski (did not play)	Defense	
53rd	2003	Martin Brodeur	Goaltender	
53rd	2003	Scott Stevens	Defense	
54th	2004	Martin Brodeur	Goaltender	
54th	2004	Scott Niedermayer†	Defense	
54th	2004	Brian Rafalski	Defense	
54th	2004	Scott Stevens† (did not play)	Defense	
55th	2007	Martin Brodeur	Goaltender	
55th	2007	Brian Rafalski	Defense	
56th	2008	Martin Brodeur† (did not play)	Goaltender	
57th	2009	Zach Parise	Left wing	
58th	2011	Patrik Elias	Left wing	
59th	2012	No Devils selected	—	
60th	2015	Patrik Elias	Left wing	
61st	2016	Cory Schneider	Goaltender	
62nd	2017	Taylor Hall	Left wing	
63rd	2018	Taylor Hall (did not play)	Left wing	
63rd	2018	Brian Boyle (subbed for Hall)	Center	
64th	2019	Taylor Hall (did not play)	Left wing	
64th	2019	Kyle Palmieri (subbed for Hall)	Right wing	
65th	2020	Nico Hischier (subbed for Palmieri)	Center	
65th	2020	Kyle Palmieri (did not play)	Right wing	
66th	2022	Jack Hughes	Center	
67th	2023	Jack Hughes	Center	
68th	2024	Jesper Bratt (subbed for Hughes)	Left wing	
68th	2024	Jack Hughes (did not play)	Center	

=== All-Star Game replacement events ===
New Jersey Devils franchise players and coaches selected to All-Star Game replacement events
Event	Year	Name	Position	References
Challenge Cup	1979	Barry Beck	Defense	
Rendez-vous '87	1987	Kirk Muller	Left wing	
4 Nations Face-Off	2025	Jesper Bratt (Sweden)	Left wing	
4 Nations Face-Off	2025	Erik Haula (Finland)	Center	
4 Nations Face-Off	2025	Jack Hughes (United States)	Center	
4 Nations Face-Off	2025	Jacob Markström (Sweden)	Goaltender	

== Career achievements ==
=== Hockey Hall of Fame ===
Several members of the Devils organization have been honored by the Hockey Hall of Fame during the team's history in New Jersey. Peter Stastny was the first former Devils to be inducted, gaining election in 1998. Stastny played part of four seasons with the Devils, scoring 173 points in 217 games. Former teammate Viacheslav Fetisov joined him in 2001; the Russian defenseman played six years in New Jersey, and was an assistant coach from 1999 to 2002. Scott Stevens, the team captain for 13 years, was inducted in 2007, the first Hall member to earn his credentials primarily as a member of the Devils. In 2008, Igor Larionov was inducted into the Hall; he played his final season with the Devils in the 2003–04 NHL season. Devils coaches Jacques Lemaire (inducted 1984) and Larry Robinson (inducted 1995) were inducted as players prior to their involvement with the Devils organization.

In addition to players, two members of team management have been inducted in the "Builders" category. Former coach Herb Brooks, the man behind the United States' improbable "Miracle on Ice" victory in the 1980 Winter Olympics, was inducted in 2006. Brooks coached the Devils during the 1992–93 campaign. Three years later, longtime general manager Lou Lamoriello was inducted. Lamoriello, the team's third GM, has been with the team since 1987, and is considered responsible for engineering the franchise's success.

New Jersey Devils inducted into the Hockey Hall of Fame
Individual	Category	Year inducted	Years with franchise in category	References
Dave Andreychuk	Player	2017	1996–1999	
Martin Brodeur	Player	2018	1991–2014	
Herb Brooks	Builder	2006	1992–1993	
Viacheslav Fetisov	Player	2001	1989–1995	
Doug Gilmour	Player	2011	1997–1998	
Phil Housley	Player	2015	1996	
Lou Lamoriello	Builder	2009	1987–2015	
Igor Larionov	Player	2008	2003–2004	
Lanny McDonald	Player	1992	1979–1981	
Alexander Mogilny	Player	2005	2000–2001, 2005–2006	
Scott Niedermayer	Player	2013	1991–2004	
Joe Nieuwendyk	Player	2011	2002–2003	
Brendan Shanahan	Player	2013	1987–1991, 2008–2009	
Peter Stastny	Player	1998	1990–1993	
Scott Stevens	Player	2007	1991–2004	

=== Foster Hewitt Memorial Award ===
The Foster Hewitt Memorial Award is presented by the Hockey Hall of Fame to members of the radio and television industry who make outstanding contributions to their profession and the game of ice hockey during their broadcasting career. In 2008, longtime Devils television broadcaster Mike "Doc" Emrick was honored with the award for his years of play-by-play broadcasting for the Devils and various other networks and teams. In addition to the Devils, Emrick is the regular play-by-play announcer for the NHL on NBC, and has covered multiple Olympic broadcasts.

Members of the New Jersey Devils honored with the Foster Hewitt Memorial Award
Individual	Year honored	Years with Devils as broadcaster	References
Mike Emrick	2008	1982–1986, 1993–2011	

=== Lester Patrick Trophy ===
Eight members of the Devils organization have been honored with the Lester Patrick Trophy. The trophy has been presented by the National Hockey League and USA Hockey since 1966 to honor a recipient's contribution to ice hockey in the United States. This list includes all personnel who have ever been employed by the New Jersey Devils in any capacity and have also received the Lester Patrick Trophy.

Members of the New Jersey Devils honored with the Lester Patrick Trophy
Individual	Year honored	Years with Devils	References
Herb Brooks	2002	1992–1993	
Neal Broten	1998	1995–1996	
Mike Emrick	2004	1982–1986, 1993–2011	
Phil Housley	2008	1996	
Mark Johnson	2011	1985–1990	
Lou Lamoriello	1992	1987–2015	
Max McNab	1998	1983–1987	
Lou Vairo	2000	1984–1986	

=== United States Hockey Hall of Fame ===
Members of the New Jersey Devils inducted into the United States Hockey Hall of Fame
Individual	Year inducted	Years with franchise	References
Herb Brooks	1990	1992–1993	
Aaron Broten	2007	1980–1990	
Neal Broten	2000	1995–1996	
Bobby Carpenter	2007	1993–1999, 2000–2004	
John Cunniff	2003	1989–1991, 2001–2002	
Mike Emrick	2011	1982–1986, 1993–2011	
Robbie Ftorek	1991	1991–1992, 1996–2000	
Brian Gionta	2019	2001–2009	
Bill Guerin	2013	1991–1997	
Phil Housley	2004	1996	
Mark Johnson	2004	1985–1990	
Lou Lamoriello	2012	1987–2015	
Brian Rafalski	2014	1999–2007	
Lou Vairo	2014	1984–1986	
John Vanbiesbrouck	2007	2001–2002	

=== Retired numbers ===
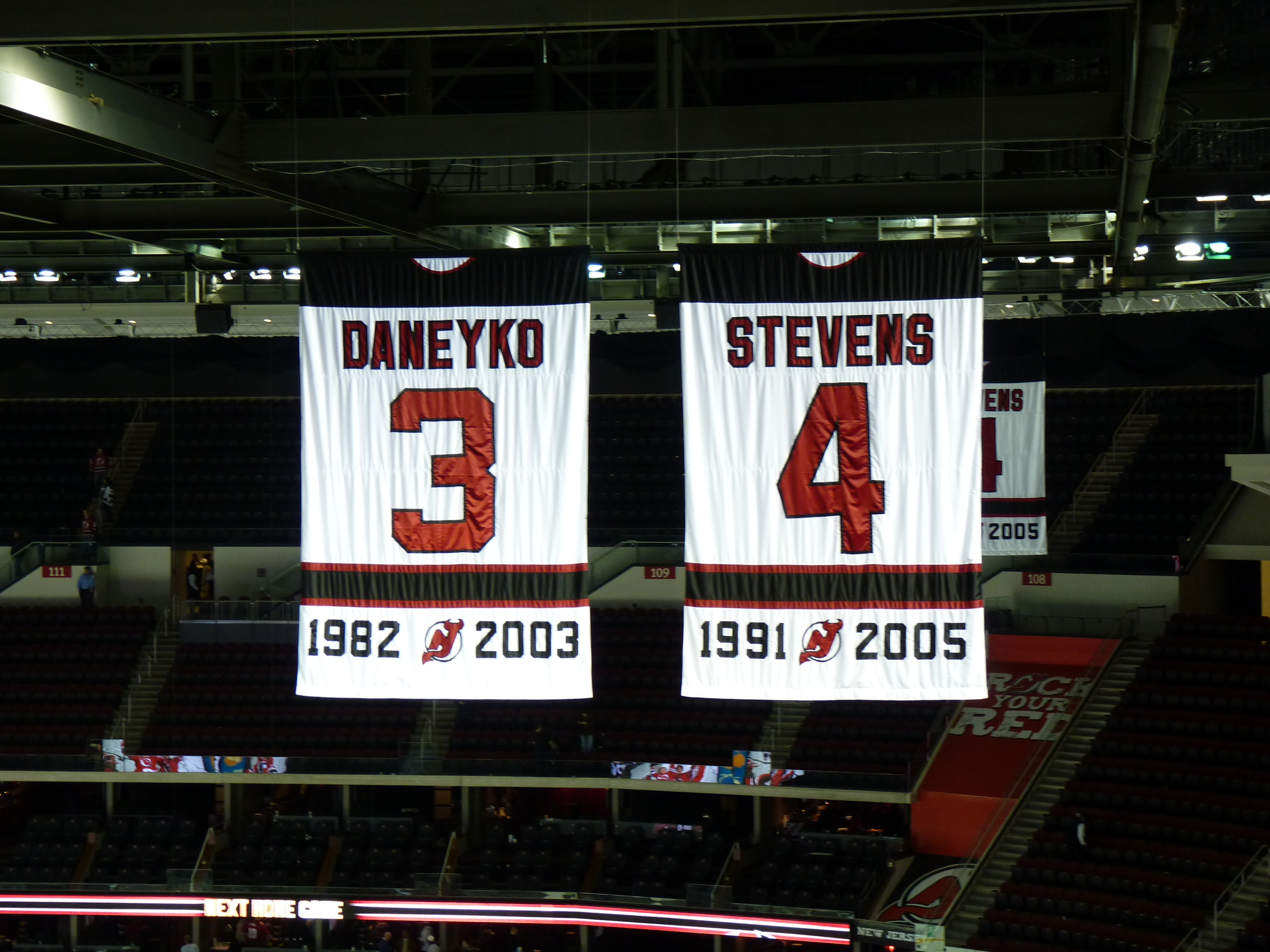
The retired numbers of Ken Daneyko (no. 3) and Scott Stevens (no. 4) hang in the rafters of the Prudential Center.

The Devils have retired five numbers. The Devils retired no. 4 for defenseman Scott Stevens in February 2006. Stevens was the team's captain for 13 seasons, and won the Conn Smythe Trophy as the most valuable player of the playoffs during the team's Stanley Cup victory in 2000. The following month, the team retired no. 3 in honor of longtime defenseman Ken Daneyko. Daneyko was drafted by the Devils in 1982, and spent his entire career with the team, retiring as the franchise's all-time leader in games played. On December 16, 2011, the Devils raised Scott Niedermayer's no. 27 to the rafters. Niedermayer won three Stanley Cups with New Jersey (1995, 2000 and 2003) and served as captain during Scott Stevens' absence in 2004. On February 9, 2016, the Devils raised Martin Brodeur's no. 30 to the rafters. On February 24, 2018, the Devils retired Patrik Elias' no. 26 jersey, who spent his entire career with the Devils and retired holding several team's records. Also out of circulation is the number 99 which was retired league-wide for Wayne Gretzky on February 6, 2000. Gretzky did not play for the Devils during his 20-year NHL career and no Devils player had ever worn the number 99 prior to its retirement.

New Jersey Devils retired numbers
Number	Player	Position	Years with Devils as a player	Date of retirement ceremony	References
3	Ken Daneyko	Defense	1982–2003	March 24, 2006	
4	Scott Stevens	Defense	1991–2005	February 3, 2006	
26	Patrik Elias	Left wing	1994–2016	February 24, 2018	
27	Scott Niedermayer	Defense	1991–2004	December 16, 2011	
30	Martin Brodeur	Goaltender	1991–2014	February 9, 2016	

== Team awards ==
=== Three-Star Award ===
The Devils award the Three-Star Award to the player who is named one of a game's top three players, or "three stars", most often over the course of the regular season. Martin Brodeur has won the award eleven times, the most in team history.

Season	Winner
1982–83	Glenn Resch
1983–84	Mel Bridgman
1984–85	Doug Sulliman
1985–86	Greg Adams
1986–87	Alain Chevrier
1987–88	Pat Verbeek
1988–89	Sean Burke
1989–90	John MacLean
1990–91	Chris Terreri
1991–92	Stephane Richer
1992–93	Alexander Semak
1993–94	Martin Brodeur

Season	Winner
1994–95	Stephane Richer
1995–96	Martin Brodeur
1996–97	Martin Brodeur
1997–98	Martin Brodeur
1998–99	Petr Sykora
1999–00	Martin Brodeur
2000–01	Patrik Elias
2001–02	Patrik Elias
2002–03	Martin Brodeur
2003–04	Patrik Elias
2005–06	Brian Gionta
2006–07	Martin Brodeur

Season	Winner
2007–08	Martin Brodeur
2008–09	Zach Parise
2009–10	Martin Brodeur
2010–11	Ilya Kovalchuk
2011–12	Ilya Kovalchuk
2012–13	Martin Brodeur
2013–14	Martin Brodeur
2014–15	Cory Schneider
2015–16	Cory Schneider
2016–17	Taylor Hall
2017–18	Taylor Hall

== Defunct team awards ==
=== Devils' Players' Player ===
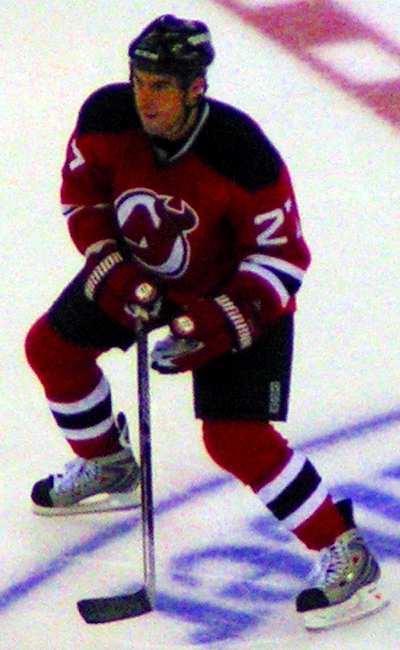
Mike Mottau, the 2010 Devils' Players' Player

The Devils' Players' Player was a team award voted on by the players. Jay Pandolfo and Scott Stevens have each won this award three times, the most of any Devil.

Season	Winner
1984–85	Rich Preston
1985–86	Rich Preston
1986–87	Doug Sulliman
1987–88	Kirk Muller
1988–89	Patrik Sundstrom
1989–90	John MacLean
1990–91	Chris Terreri
1991–92	Scott Stevens
1992–93	Scott Stevens
1993–94	Scott Stevens

Season	Winner
1994–95	Chris Terreri
1995–96	Steve Thomas
1996–97	Dave Andreychuk
1997–98	Doug Gilmour
1998–99	Sergei Brylin
1999–00	Randy McKay
2000–01	Randy McKay
2001–02	Jim McKenzie
2002–03	Joe Nieuwendyk
2003–04	Turner Stevenson

Season	Winner
2005–06	Jay Pandolfo
2006–07	Jay Pandolfo
2007–08	Jay Pandolfo
2008–09	Scott Clemmensen
2009–10	Mike Mottau
2010–11	Johan Hedberg
2011–12	Johan Hedberg
2012–13	No award
2013–14	Ryan Carter

=== Hugh Delano Unsung Hero ===
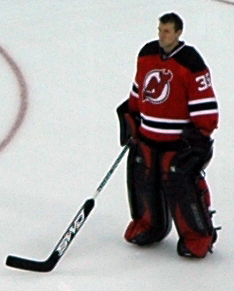
Scott Clemmensen, 2009 Hugh Delano Unsung Hero

The Hugh Delano Unsung Hero was a Devils team award given each year and voted on by the players; it was named after Hugh Delano, who was a longtime writer who covered the Devils for the New York Post. Defenseman Bryce Salvador and goaltender Johan Hedberg shared the award in 2011–12. There was a humorous mix-up at the awards dinner when rookie Adam Henrique was mistakenly announced as the winner. Jay Pandolfo won the award five times, more than any other player.

Season	Winner
1982–83	Mike Kitchen
1983–84	Ron Low
1984–85	Dave Lewis
1985–86	Rich Preston
1986–87	Ken Daneyko
1987–88	Doug Brown
1988–89	Randy Velischek
1989–90	David Maley
1990–91	Bruce Driver
1991–92	Randy McKay
1992–93	Craig Billington

Season	Winner
1993–94	Valeri Zelepukin
1994–95	Tommy Albelin
1995–96	Shawn Chambers
1996–97	Denis Pederson
1997–98	Denis Pederson
1998–99	Jay Pandolfo
1999–00	John Madden
2000–01	Sergei Brylin
2001–02	Sergei Brylin
2002–03	Jay Pandolfo
2003–04	Brian Gionta

Season	Winner
2005–06	Jay Pandolfo
2006–07	Jay Pandolfo
2007–08	Jay Pandolfo
2008–09	Scott Clemmensen
2009–10	Andy Greene
2010–11	Travis Zajac
2011–12	Johan Hedberg
2011–12	Bryce Salvador
2012–13	No award
2013–14	Andy Greene

=== Most Valuable Devil ===
The Most Valuable Devil was, as the name implies, the player judged most valuable to the team by his teammates. Zach Parise won his second consecutive award in 2010, after becoming the first player in franchise history to score 30 goals in four consecutive seasons. Martin Brodeur won this award ten times, more than any other player.

Season	Winner
1984–85	Kirk Muller
1985–86	Greg Adams
1986–87	Kirk Muller
1987–88	Kirk Muller
1988–89	Patrik Sundstrom
1989–90	John MacLean
1990–91	Chris Terreri
1991–92	Claude Lemieux
1992–93	Alexander Semak
1993–94	Scott Stevens

Season	Winner
1994–95	Stephane Richer
1995–96	Martin Brodeur
1996–97	Martin Brodeur
1997–98	Martin Brodeur
1998–99	Martin Brodeur
1999–00	Martin Brodeur
2000–01	Martin Brodeur
2000–01	Patrik Elias
2001–02	Martin Brodeur
2002–03	Martin Brodeur

Season	Winner
2003–04	Scott Niedermayer
2005–06	Brian Gionta
2006–07	Martin Brodeur
2007–08	Martin Brodeur
2008–09	Zach Parise
2009–10	Zach Parise
2010–11	Patrik Elias
2011–12	Zach Parise
2012–13	No award
2013–14	Jaromir Jagr

== Other awards ==
New Jersey Devils who have received non-NHL awards
Award	Description	Winner	Season	References
Golden Hockey Stick	Best Czech ice hockey player	Patrik Elias	2008–09	
Golden Hockey Stick	Best Czech ice hockey player	Patrik Elias	2011–12	
Golden Hockey Stick	Best Czech ice hockey player	Jaromir Jagr	2013–14	
Outstanding Performance Under Pressure ESPY	—	Martin Brodeur	1996	
Viking Award	Most valuable Swedish player in NHL	Patrik Sundstrom	1988–89	
