= 2000–01 New Jersey Devils season =

National Hockey League season

2000–01 New Jersey Devils
- Eastern Conference champions
- Atlantic Division champions
- Division: 1st Atlantic
- Conference: 1st Eastern
- 2000–01 record: 48–19–12–3
- Home record: 24–11–6–0
- Road record: 24–8–6–3
- Goals for: 295
- Goals against: 195

Team information
- General manager: Lou Lamoriello
- Coach: Larry Robinson
- Captain: Scott Stevens
- Alternate captains: Jason Arnott; Randy McKay
- Arena: Continental Airlines Arena
- Average attendance: 15,642
- Minor league affiliate: Albany River Rats

Team leaders
- Goals: Alexander Mogilny (43)
- Assists: Patrik Elias (56)
- Points: Patrik Elias (96)
- Penalty minutes: Colin White (155)
- Plus/minus: Patrik Elias (+45)
- Wins: Martin Brodeur (42)
- Goals against average: John Vanbiesbrouck (1.50)

The 2000–01 New Jersey Devils season was the 27th season for the National Hockey League (NHL) franchise that was established on June 11, 1974, and 19th season since the franchise relocated from Colorado prior to the 1982–83 NHL season. Although the Devils won the Atlantic Division and were Eastern Conference champions for the third time, the team fell short of winning back-to-back Stanley Cup championships, losing to the Colorado Avalanche in the Stanley Cup Final series, four games to three.

== Regular season ==
The Devils had a scoring finesse unseen since the 1993–94 squad; their 295 goals scored propelled them to the best offensive team in the NHL, as well as the top spot in the Eastern Conference. They had two 40-goal scorers in Patrik Elias and Alexander Mogilny, while Petr Sykora finished with an impressive 35 goals. On October 28 at Pittsburgh, the Devils won in a 9–0 rout that saw John Madden and Randy McKay each score four goals. Martin Brodeur, as in previous seasons, played strongly, finishing with 42 wins, a 2.32 goals against average (GAA) and nine shutouts. Defensively, the team was also strong; their 195 goals allowed were the second-fewest in the East. From February 26 to March 23, the team went on a 13-game winning streak.

Despite having the fewest power-play opportunities of all 30 League teams with 310, the Devils had the best power play percentage at 22.90% (71 for 310).

=== Season standings ===
Atlantic Division
No.	CR		GP	W	L	T	OTL	GF	GA	Pts
1	1	**New Jersey Devils**	82	48	19	12	3	295	195	111
2	4	**Philadelphia Flyers**	82	43	25	11	3	240	207	100
3	6	**Pittsburgh Penguins**	82	42	28	9	3	281	256	96
4	10	New York Rangers	82	33	43	5	1	250	290	72
5	15	New York Islanders	82	21	51	7	3	185	268	52

Note: CR = Conference rank; GP = Games played; W = Wins; L = Losses; T = Ties; OTL = Overtime loss; GF = Goals for; GA = Goals against; Pts = Points
Bolded teams qualified for the playoffs.

Eastern Conference
R		Div	GP	W	L	T	OTL	GF	GA	Pts
**1**	**Z-** New Jersey Devils	**AT**	**82**	**48**	**19**	**12**	**3**	**295**	**195**	111
**2**	**Y-** Ottawa Senators	**NE**	**82**	**48**	**21**	**9**	**4**	**274**	**205**	109
**3**	**Y-** Washington Capitals	**SE**	**82**	**41**	**27**	**10**	**4**	**233**	**211**	96
**4**	**X-** Philadelphia Flyers	**AT**	**82**	**43**	**25**	**11**	**3**	**240**	**207**	100
**5**	**X-** Buffalo Sabres	**NE**	**82**	**46**	**30**	**5**	**1**	**218**	**184**	98
**6**	**X-** Pittsburgh Penguins	**AT**	**82**	**42**	**28**	**9**	**3**	**281**	**256**	96
**7**	**X-** Toronto Maple Leafs	**NE**	**82**	**37**	**29**	**11**	**5**	**232**	**207**	90
**8**	**X-** Carolina Hurricanes	**SE**	**82**	**38**	**32**	**9**	**3**	**212**	**225**	88
8.5
9	Boston Bruins	NE	82	36	30	8	8	227	249	88
10	New York Rangers	AT	82	33	43	5	1	250	290	72
11	Montreal Canadiens	NE	82	28	40	8	6	206	232	70
12	Florida Panthers	SE	82	22	38	13	9	200	246	66
13	Atlanta Thrashers	SE	82	23	45	12	2	211	289	60
14	Tampa Bay Lightning	SE	82	24	47	6	5	201	280	59
15	New York Islanders	AT	82	21	51	7	3	185	268	52

Divisions: AT – Atlantic, NE – Northeast, SE – Southeast

Z – Clinched conference; Y – Clinched division; X – Clinched playoff spot

== Schedule and results ==
=== Regular season ===
2000–01 regular season
October: 6–2–2–0 (home: 4–0–0–0; road: 2–2–2–0)

Game	Date	Score	Opponent	Record	Recap
1	October 6, 2000	8–4	Montreal Canadiens (2000–01)	1–0–0–0	W
2	October 13, 2000	1–3	@ Ottawa Senators (2000–01)	1–1–0–0	L
3	October 14, 2000	4–2	Mighty Ducks of Anaheim (2000–01)	2–1–0–0	W
4	October 17, 2000	3–3 OT	@ Atlanta Thrashers (2000–01)	2–1–1–0	T
5	October 19, 2000	2–5	@ Washington Capitals (2000–01)	2–2–1–0	L
6	October 21, 2000	7–2	Tampa Bay Lightning (2000–01)	3–2–1–0	W
7	October 25, 2000	2–1	@ Florida Panthers (2000–01)	4–2–1–0	W
8	October 27, 2000	3–3 OT	@ Carolina Hurricanes (2000–01)	4–2–2–0	T
9	October 28, 2000	9–0	@ Pittsburgh Penguins (2000–01)	5–2–2–0	W
10	October 30, 2000	6–5 OT	Florida Panthers (2000–01)	6–2–2–0	W

November: 6–6–1–0 (home: 2–5–1–0; road: 4–1–0–0)

Game	Date	Score	Opponent	Record	Recap
11	November 1, 2000	1–1 OT	Philadelphia Flyers (2000–01)	6–2–3–0	T
12	November 2, 2000	3–5	@ Toronto Maple Leafs (2000–01)	6–3–3–0	L
13	November 4, 2000	1–2	Los Angeles Kings (2000–01)	6–4–3–0	L
14	November 8, 2000	3–4	Nashville Predators (2000–01)	6–5–3–0	L
15	November 10, 2000	2–4	Pittsburgh Penguins (2000–01)	6–6–3–0	L
16	November 11, 2000	0–4	Buffalo Sabres (2000–01)	6–7–3–0	L
17	November 14, 2000	2–3	San Jose Sharks (2000–01)	6–8–3–0	L
18	November 16, 2000	3–2 OT	@ Boston Bruins (2000–01)	7–8–3–0	W
19	November 18, 2000	3–2 OT	Carolina Hurricanes (2000–01)	8–8–3–0	W
20	November 22, 2000	5–2	@ Mighty Ducks of Anaheim (2000–01)	9–8–3–0	W
21	November 23, 2000	6–1	@ Los Angeles Kings (2000–01)	10–8–3–0	W
22	November 25, 2000	3–2	@ San Jose Sharks (2000–01)	11–8–3–0	W
23	November 29, 2000	5–2	New York Rangers (2000–01)	12–8–3–0	W

December: 8–3–3–0 (home: 5–1–2–0; road: 3–2–1–0)

Game	Date	Score	Opponent	Record	Recap
24	December 1, 2000	0–0 OT	New York Islanders (2000–01)	12–8–4–0	T
25	December 3, 2000	1–1 OT	@ New York Islanders (2000–01)	12–8–5–0	T
26	December 5, 2000	6–1	Colorado Avalanche (2000–01)	13–8–5–0	W
27	December 7, 2000	2–5	@ Buffalo Sabres (2000–01)	13–9–5–0	L
28	December 9, 2000	2–3	Washington Capitals (2000–01)	13–10–5–0	L
29	December 11, 2000	4–0	Atlanta Thrashers (2000–01)	14–10–5–0	W
30	December 15, 2000	2–1	Montreal Canadiens (2000–01)	15–10–5–0	W
31	December 16, 2000	3–6	@ Philadelphia Flyers (2000–01)	15–11–5–0	L
32	December 20, 2000	4–1	Dallas Stars (2000–01)	16–11–5–0	W
33	December 22, 2000	2–0	@ Florida Panthers (2000–01)	17–11–5–0	W
34	December 23, 2000	5–1	@ Tampa Bay Lightning (2000–01)	18–11–5–0	W
35	December 27, 2000	2–2 OT	Columbus Blue Jackets (2000–01)	18–11–6–0	T
36	December 29, 2000	4–2	Washington Capitals (2000–01)	19–11–6–0	W
37	December 31, 2000	6–3	@ Columbus Blue Jackets (2000–01)	20–11–6–0	W

January: 7–2–3–2 (home: 4–1–2–0; road: 3–1–1–2)

Game	Date	Score	Opponent	Record	Recap
38	January 2, 2001	1–1 OT	Philadelphia Flyers (2000–01)	20–11–7–0	T
39	January 4, 2001	4–2	New York Islanders (2000–01)	21–11–7–0	W
40	January 6, 2001	5–5 OT	@ New York Rangers (2000–01)	21–11–8–0	T
41	January 10, 2001	5–1	Phoenix Coyotes (2000–01)	22–11–8–0	W
42	January 13, 2001	4–4 OT	Toronto Maple Leafs (2000–01)	22–11–9–0	T
43	January 16, 2001	4–5	Boston Bruins (2000–01)	22–12–9–0	L
44	January 18, 2001	7–1	@ Philadelphia Flyers (2000–01)	23–12–9–0	W
45	January 20, 2001	3–2	Atlanta Thrashers (2000–01)	24–12–9–0	W
46	January 21, 2001	4–2	@ Minnesota Wild (2000–01)	25–12–9–0	W
47	January 24, 2001	4–1	@ Dallas Stars (2000–01)	26–12–9–0	W
48	January 25, 2001	3–4 OT	@ St. Louis Blues (2000–01)	26–12–9–1	OTL
49	January 27, 2001	3–4 OT	@ Boston Bruins (2000–01)	26–12–9–2	OTL
50	January 30, 2001	3–1	Detroit Red Wings (2000–01)	27–12–9–2	W
51	January 31, 2001	2–3	@ New York Islanders (2000–01)	27–13–9–2	L

February: 4–4–3–1 (home: 1–2–1–0; road: 3–2–2–1)

Game	Date	Score	Opponent	Record	Recap
52	February 6, 2001	4–0	@ Montreal Canadiens (2000–01)	28–13–9–2	W
53	February 8, 2001	4–4 OT	@ Ottawa Senators (2000–01)	28–13–10–2	T
54	February 10, 2001	4–5 OT	@ Pittsburgh Penguins (2000–01)	28–13–10–3	OTL
55	February 11, 2001	1–1 OT	@ New York Rangers (2000–01)	28–13–11–3	T
56	February 14, 2001	2–3	Ottawa Senators (2000–01)	28–14–11–3	L
57	February 16, 2001	4–4 OT	Pittsburgh Penguins (2000–01)	28–14–12–3	T
58	February 17, 2001	1–5	@ Buffalo Sabres (2000–01)	28–15–12–3	L
59	February 19, 2001	2–0	@ Toronto Maple Leafs (2000–01)	29–15–12–3	W
60	February 22, 2001	0–1	Buffalo Sabres (2000–01)	29–16–12–3	L
61	February 23, 2001	2–3	@ Carolina Hurricanes (2000–01)	29–17–12–3	L
62	February 26, 2001	5–3	Florida Panthers (2000–01)	30–17–12–3	W
63	February 27, 2001	4–1	@ New York Islanders (2000–01)	31–17–12–3	W

March: 13–2–0–0 (home: 6–2–0–0; road: 7–0–0–0)

Game	Date	Score	Opponent	Record	Recap
64	March 2, 2001	7–3	Carolina Hurricanes (2000–01)	32–17–12–3	W
65	March 4, 2001	6–0	Tampa Bay Lightning (2000–01)	33–17–12–3	W
66	March 6, 2001	3–2 OT	Ottawa Senators (2000–01)	34–17–12–3	W
67	March 8, 2001	6–2	Minnesota Wild (2000–01)	35–17–12–3	W
68	March 10, 2001	3–2	@ Philadelphia Flyers (2000–01)	36–17–12–3	W
69	March 13, 2001	6–3	@ Colorado Avalanche (2000–01)	37–17–12–3	W
70	March 14, 2001	3–2	@ Phoenix Coyotes (2000–01)	38–17–12–3	W
71	March 17, 2001	6–5 OT	@ Edmonton Oilers (2000–01)	39–17–12–3	W
72	March 19, 2001	4–2	@ Calgary Flames (2000–01)	40–17–12–3	W
73	March 21, 2001	4–0	New York Rangers (2000–01)	41–17–12–3	W
74	March 23, 2001	4–0	Vancouver Canucks (2000–01)	42–17–12–3	W
75	March 25, 2001	2–4	Pittsburgh Penguins (2000–01)	42–18–12–3	L
76	March 27, 2001	7–1	@ Tampa Bay Lightning (2000–01)	43–18–12–3	W
77	March 28, 2001	4–2	@ Atlanta Thrashers (2000–01)	44–18–12–3	W
78	March 31, 2001	3–4	New York Rangers (2000–01)	44–19–12–3	L

April: 4–0–0–0 (home: 2–0–0–0; road: 2–0–0–0)

Game	Date	Score	Opponent	Record	Recap
79	April 2, 2001	4–3	Chicago Blackhawks (2000–01)	45–19–12–3	W
80	April 3, 2001	6–4	@ Washington Capitals (2000–01)	46–19–12–3	W
81	April 6, 2001	5–2	Boston Bruins (2000–01)	47–19–12–3	W
82	April 7, 2001	2–0	@ Montreal Canadiens (2000–01)	48–19–12–3	W

Legend: W Win (2 points) L Loss (0 points) T Tie (1 point) OTL Overtime loss (1 point)

=== Playoffs ===
2001 Stanley Cup playoffs
Eastern Conference Quarterfinals vs. (8) Carolina Hurricanes – Devils win 4–2

Game	Date	Score	Opponent	Series	Recap
1	April 12, 2001	5–1	Carolina Hurricanes	Devils lead 1–0	W
2	April 15, 2001	2–0	Carolina Hurricanes	Devils lead 2–0	W
3	April 17, 2001	4–0	@ Carolina Hurricanes	Devils lead 3–0	W
4	April 18, 2001	2–3 OT	@ Carolina Hurricanes	Devils lead 3–1	L
5	April 20, 2001	2–3	Carolina Hurricanes	Devils lead 3–2	L
6	April 22, 2001	5–1	@ Carolina Hurricanes	Devils win 4–2	W

Eastern Conference Semifinals vs. (7) Toronto Maple Leafs – Devils win 4–3

Game	Date	Score	Opponent	Series	Recap
1	April 26, 2001	0–2	Toronto Maple Leafs	Maple Leafs lead 1–0	L
2	April 28, 2001	6–5 OT	Toronto Maple Leafs	Series tied 1–1	W
3	May 1, 2001	3–2 OT	@ Toronto Maple Leafs	Devils lead 2–1	W
4	May 3, 2001	1–3	@ Toronto Maple Leafs	Series tied 2–2	L
5	May 5, 2001	2–3	Toronto Maple Leafs	Maple Leafs lead 3–2	L
6	May 7, 2001	4–2	@ Toronto Maple Leafs	Series tied 3–3	W
7	May 9, 2001	5–1	Toronto Maple Leafs	Devils win 4–3	W

Eastern Conference Finals vs. (6) Pittsburgh Penguins – Devils win 4–1

Game	Date	Score	Opponent	Series	Recap
1	May 12, 2001	3–1	Pittsburgh Penguins	Devils lead 1–0	W
2	May 15, 2001	2–4	Pittsburgh Penguins	Series tied 1–1	L
3	May 17, 2001	3–0	@ Pittsburgh Penguins	Devils lead 2–1	W
4	May 19, 2001	5–0	@ Pittsburgh Penguins	Devils lead 3–1	W
5	May 22, 2001	4–2	Pittsburgh Penguins	Devils win 4–1	W

Stanley Cup Final vs. (W1) Colorado Avalanche – Avalanche win 4–3

Game	Date	Score	Opponent	Series	Recap
1	May 26, 2001	0–5	@ Colorado Avalanche	Avalanche lead 1–0	L
2	May 29, 2001	2–1	@ Colorado Avalanche	Series tied 1–1	W
3	May 31, 2001	1–3	Colorado Avalanche	Avalanche lead 2–1	L
4	June 2, 2001	3–2	Colorado Avalanche	Series tied 2–2	W
5	June 4, 2001	4–1	@ Colorado Avalanche	Devils lead 3–2	W
6	June 7, 2001	0–4	Colorado Avalanche	Series tied 3–3	L
7	June 9, 2001	1–3	@ Colorado Avalanche	Avalanche win 4–3	L

Legend: W Win L Loss

== Player statistics ==
=== Scoring ===
- Position abbreviations: C = Center; D = Defense; G = Goaltender; LW = Left wing; RW = Right wing
- † = Joined team via a transaction (e.g., trade, waivers, signing) during the season. Stats reflect time with the Devils only.
- ‡ = Left team via a transaction (e.g., trade, waivers, release) during the season. Stats reflect time with the Devils only.

No.	Player	Pos	Regular season						Playoffs					
No.	Player	Pos	GP	G	A	Pts	+/-	PIM	GP	G	A	Pts	+/-	PIM
26	Patrik Elias	LW	82	40	56	96	45	51	25	9	14	23	11	10
89	Alexander Mogilny	RW	75	43	40	83	10	43	25	5	11	16	3	8
17	Petr Sykora	RW	73	35	46	81	36	32	25	10	12	22	15	12
23	Scott Gomez	C	76	14	49	63	−1	46	25	5	9	14	7	24
25	Jason Arnott	C	54	21	34	55	23	75	23	8	7	15	8	16
18	Sergei Brylin	LW	75	23	29	52	25	24	20	3	4	7	1	6
28	Brian Rafalski	D	78	9	43	52	36	26	25	7	11	18	10	7
16	Bobby Holik	C	80	15	35	50	19	97	25	6	10	16	1	37
21	Randy McKay	RW	77	23	20	43	3	50	19	6	3	9	3	8
11	John Madden	C	80	23	15	38	24	12	25	4	3	7	2	6
27	Scott Niedermayer	D	57	6	29	35	14	22	21	0	6	6	7	14
4	Scott Stevens	D	81	9	22	31	40	71	25	1	7	8	3	37
12	Sergei Nemchinov	LW	65	8	22	30	11	16	25	1	3	4	0	4
24	Turner Stevenson	RW	69	8	18	26	11	97	23	1	3	4	2	20
5	Colin White	D	82	1	19	20	32	155	25	0	3	3	7	42
20	Jay Pandolfo	LW	63	4	12	16	3	16	25	1	4	5	−1	4
2	Ken Sutton	D	53	1	7	8	9	37	6	0	0	0	1	13
14	Pierre Dagenais	RW	9	3	2	5	1	6	—	—	—	—	—	—
6	Mike Commodore	D	20	1	4	5	5	14	—	—	—	—	—	—
22	Bob Corkum†	C	17	3	1	4	4	4	12	1	2	3	−2	0
15	Steve Kelly‡	C	24	2	2	4	0	21	—	—	—	—	—	—
19	Jim McKenzie	LW	53	2	2	4	0	119	3	0	0	0	1	2
3	Ken Daneyko	D	77	0	4	4	8	87	25	0	3	3	4	21
7 (Note: Mitchell wore number 6 in his first eleven games.)	Willie Mitchell‡	D	16	0	2	2	0	29	—	—	—	—	—	—
9	Jiri Bicek	RW	5	1	0	1	0	4	—	—	—	—	—	—
30	Martin Brodeur	G	72	0	1	1		14	25	0	1	1		0
6	Sean O'Donnell†	D	17	0	1	1	2	33	23	1	2	3	5	41
22	Ed Ward	RW	4	0	1	1	2	6	—	—	—	—	—	—
8	Mike Danton	C	2	0	0	0	0	6	—	—	—	—	—	—
7	Sascha Goc	D	11	0	0	0	7	4	—	—	—	—	—	—
10	Stanislav Gron	RW	1	0	0	0	1	0	—	—	—	—	—	—
31	Chris Terreri‡	G	10	0	0	0		0	—	—	—	—	—	—
34	John Vanbiesbrouck†	G	4	0	0	0		0	—	—	—	—	—	—

=== Goaltending ===
- † = Joined team via a transaction (e.g., trade, waivers, signing) during the season. Stats reflect time with the Devils only.
- ‡ = Left team via a transaction (e.g., trade, waivers, release) during the season. Stats reflect time with the Devils only.

No.	Player	Regular season										Playoffs								
No.	Player	GP	W	L	T	SA	GA	GAA	SV%	SO	TOI	GP	W	L	SA	GA	GAA	SV%	SO	TOI
30	Martin Brodeur	72	42	17	11	1762	166	2.32	.906	9	4297	25	15	10	507	52	2.07	.897	4	1505
34	John Vanbiesbrouck†	4	4	0	0	93	6	1.50	.935	1	240	—	—	—	—	—	—	—	—	—
31	Chris Terreri‡	10	2	5	1	167	21	2.78	.874	0	453	—	—	—	—	—	—	—	—	—

== Awards and records ==
=== Awards ===
Martin Brodeur was also a finalist for the Vezina Trophy.

Type	Award/honor	Recipient	Ref
League (annual)	Frank J. Selke Trophy	John Madden	
League (annual)	NHL First All-Star Team	Patrik Elias (Left wing)	
League (annual)	NHL Second All-Star Team	Scott Stevens (Defense)	
League (annual)	NHL All-Rookie Team	Colin White (Defense)	
League (annual)	NHL Plus-Minus Award	Patrik Elias (Note: Co-winner with Joe Sakic of the Colorado Avalanche.)	
League (in-season)	NHL All-Star Game selection	Martin Brodeur	
League (in-season)	NHL All-Star Game selection	Alexander Mogilny (Note: Mogilny did not play and was replaced by Milan Hejduk of the Colorado Avalanche.)	
League (in-season)	NHL All-Star Game selection	Scott Niedermayer (Note: Niedermayer was an injury replacement for Al MacInnis of the St. Louis Blues.)	
League (in-season)	NHL All-Star Game selection	Larry Robinson (coach)	
League (in-season)	NHL All-Star Game selection	Scott Stevens	
League (in-season)	NHL Player of the Week	Patrik Elias (March 5)	
Team	Devils' Players' Player	Randy McKay	
Team	Hugh Delano Unsung Hero	Sergei Brylin	
Team	Most Valuable Devil	Martin Brodeur	
Team	Most Valuable Devil	Patrik Elias	
Team	Three-Star Award	Patrik Elias	

=== Milestones ===
Milestone	Player	Date	Ref
First game	Sascha Goc	October 19, 2000	
First game	Mike Commodore	December 22, 2000	
First game	Pierre Dagenais	February 17, 2001	
First game	Jiri Bicek	February 19, 2001	
First game	Mike Danton	February 23, 2001	
First game	Stanislav Gron	February 23, 2001	
500th game played	Martin Brodeur	February 19, 2001	

== Transactions ==
The Devils were involved in the following transactions from June 11, 2000, the day after the deciding game of the 2000 Stanley Cup Final, through June 9, 2001, the day of the deciding game of the 2001 Stanley Cup Final.

=== Trades ===
Date	Details		Ref
June 12, 2000	To New Jersey Devils: 3rd-round pick in 2001; Future considerations (Note: Columbus sent Turner Stevenson to New Jersey on June 23 to complete the trade.)	To Columbus Blue Jackets: Krzysztof Oliwa; Future considerations (Note: Assigned Deron Quint's rights to Columbus on June 23.)	
June 12, 2000	To New Jersey Devils: Ed Ward	To Anaheim Mighty Ducks: 7th-round pick in 2001	
June 12, 2000	To New Jersey Devils: Steve Staios	To Atlanta Thrashers: 9th-round pick in 2000	
June 23, 2000	To New Jersey Devils: Chris Terreri; 9th-round pick in 2000	To Minnesota Wild: Brad Bombardir	
June 25, 2000	To New Jersey Devils: 8th-round pick in 2001	To Tampa Bay Lightning: 9th-round pick in 2000	
July 10, 2000	To New Jersey Devils: Future considerations	To Atlanta Thrashers: Steve Staios	
November 6, 2000	To New Jersey Devils: Geordie Kinnear	To Atlanta Thrashers: Future considerations	
February 23, 2001	To New Jersey Devils: Bob Corkum	To Los Angeles Kings: Future considerations	
February 27, 2001	To New Jersey Devils: Future considerations	To Los Angeles Kings: Steve Kelly	
March 4, 2001	To New Jersey Devils: Sean O'Donnell	To Minnesota Wild: Willie Mitchell; Future considerations	
March 12, 2001	To New Jersey Devils: John Vanbiesbrouck	To New York Islanders: Chris Terreri; 9th-round pick in 2001	

=== Players acquired ===
Date	Player	Former team	Term	Via	Ref
June 27, 2000	Jason Lehoux	Hull Olympiques (QMJHL)		Free agency	
July 3, 2000	Jim McKenzie	Washington Capitals		Free agency	
July 18, 2000	Chris Ferraro	New York Islanders		Free agency	
April 1, 2001	Joel Dezainde	Mississippi Sea Wolves (ECHL)		Free agency	

=== Players lost ===
Date	Player	New team	Via (Note: In parentheses is the player's free agency group on July 1 if applicable.)	Ref
June 23, 2000	Chris Terreri	Minnesota Wild	Expansion draft	
June 23, 2000	Jeff Williams	Columbus Blue Jackets	Expansion draft	
July 10, 2000	Vladimir Malakhov	New York Rangers	Free agency (III)	
July 20, 2000	Steve Brule	Detroit Red Wings	Free agency (VI)	
September 13, 2000	Mike Buzak	Long Beach Ice Dogs (ECHL)	Free agency (VI)	
September 25, 2000	Sasha Lakovic	Long Beach Ice Dogs (ECHL)	Free agency (VI)	
September 29, 2000	George Awada	Richmond Renegades (ECHL)	Free agency (UFA)	
December 2, 2000	Claude Lemieux	Phoenix Coyotes	Free agency (III)	
December 22, 2000	Geordie Kinnear		Retirement	

=== Signings ===
Date	Player	Term	Contract type	Ref
July 11, 2000	Josef Boumedienne		Entry-level	
July 12, 2000	Jay Pandolfo	2-year	Re-signing	
July 12, 2000	Rob Skrlac		Re-signing	
July 14, 2000	Mike Commodore		Entry-level	
July 21, 2000	Mike Rupp		Entry-level	
July 28, 2000	Sergei Nemchinov		Re-signing	
August 3, 2000	Richard Rochefort		Re-signing	
August 10, 2000	Colin White		Re-signing	
August 24, 2000	Frederic Henry		Re-signing	
August 25, 2000	Sylvain Cloutier		Re-signing	
September 8, 2000	Steve Kelly		Re-signing	
November 20, 2000	Jason Arnott	2-year	Re-signing	
November 20, 2000	Scott Niedermayer	4-year	Re-signing	
June 2, 2001	Christian Berglund		Entry-level	
June 2, 2001	Scott Clemmensen		Entry-level	
June 2, 2001	Brett Clouthier		Entry-level	
June 2, 2001	Brian Gionta		Entry-level	

== Draft picks ==
The Devils' draft picks at the 2000 NHL entry draft at the Pengrowth Saddledome in Calgary, Alberta, Canada.

Round	#	Player	Nat	Pos	College/Junior/Club team (League)	Notes
1	22	David Hale	United States	D	Sioux City Musketeers (USHL)	(Note: The Devils acquired the 2000 first-round draft pick (Hale), 2000 second-round pick (DeMarchi), and Claude Lemieux from Colorado for Brian Rolston and the Devils' original 2000 first-round pick (later transferred to Boston and used on Martin Samuelsson) on November 3, 1999.)
2	39	Teemu Laine	Finland	F	Jokerit (Finland)	(Note: The Devils acquired the Islanders' 2000 second-round pick (Laine) and Atlanta's 2000 third-round pick (Birbraer) from Vancouver for Vadim Sharifijanov and the Devils' 2000 third-round pick (used on Tim Branham) on January 14, 2000.)
2	56	Aleksander Suglobov	Russia	RW	Torpedo-2 Yaroslavl (Russia)	(Note: Compensatory pick awarded by the NHL as compensation for 1998 first round pick Mike Van Ryn not being signed.)
2	57	Matt DeMarchi	United States	D	University of Minnesota (WCHA)	
2	62	Paul Martin	United States	D	Elk River High School (USHS–MN)	
3	67	Max Birbraer	Kazakhstan	LW	Newmarket Hurricanes (OPJHL)	
3	76	Mike Rupp	United States	LW	Erie Otters (OHL)	(Note: The Devils acquired the 2000 third-round pick from Chicago for Bryan Muir on November 13, 1998. Rupp scored the Stanley Cup-winning goal for the Devils against the Mighty Ducks of Anaheim in Game 7 of the 2003 Stanley Cup Final. The Devils had traded their original third-round pick to Vancouver (see above note on Laine and Birbraer).)
4	125	Phil Cole	Canada	D	Lethbridge Hurricanes (WHL)	
5	135	Mike Danton	Canada	C	Barrie Colts (OHL)	(Note: Compensatory pick awarded by the NHL as compensation for free agent Dave Andreychuk.)
5	164	Matus Kostur	Slovakia	G	HKm Zvolen (Slovakia)	
6	194	Deryk Engelland	Canada	D	Moose Jaw Warriors (WHL)	
7	198	Ken Magowan	Canada	LW	Vernon Vipers (BCHL)	(Note: The Devils acquired the 2000 seventh-round pick, along with Sylvain Cloutier and Jeff Williams, from Atlanta for Wes Mason and Eric Bertrand on November 1, 1999. The Devils' official transaction page does not include this draft pick in the transaction. The Devils' original 2000 seventh-round pick (used on Brian Eklund) had been traded to Tampa Bay in exchange for Steve Kelly on October 7, 1999.)
8	257	Warren McCutcheon	Canada	C	Lethbridge Hurricanes (WHL)	
9	290	No ninth-round pick				(Note: The Devils traded their 2000 ninth-round pick (used on Simon Gamache) to Atlanta for Steve Staios on June 12, 2000.)

== See also ==
- 2000–01 NHL season
