= 2006–07 New Jersey Devils season =

National Hockey League team season

2006–07 New Jersey Devils
- Atlantic Division champions
- Division: 1st Atlantic
- Conference: 2nd Eastern
- 2006–07 record: 49–24–9
- Home record: 25–10–6
- Road record: 24–14–3
- Goals for: 216
- Goals against: 201

Team information
- General manager: Lou Lamoriello
- Coach: Claude Julien (Oct.–Apr.); Lou Lamoriello (Apr.–May)
- Captain: Patrik Elias
- Alternate captains: Jamie Langenbrunner; John Madden; Jay Pandolfo; Colin White
- Arena: Continental Airlines Arena
- Average attendance: 14,176
- Minor league affiliate: Lowell Devils

Team leaders
- Goals: Zach Parise (31)
- Assists: Patrik Elias (48)
- Points: Patrik Elias (69)
- Penalty minutes: Cam Janssen (114)
- Plus/minus: Scott Gomez (+7)
- Wins: Martin Brodeur (48)
- Goals against average: Martin Brodeur (2.18)

The 2006–07 New Jersey Devils season was the 33rd season for the National Hockey League (NHL) franchise that was established on June 11, 1974, and 25th season since the franchise relocated from Colorado prior to the 1982–83 NHL season. The team qualified again for the Stanley Cup playoffs, losing in the second round to the Ottawa Senators.

== Regular season ==
The 2006–07 season saw the team attempting to maintain its position among the top teams in the National Hockey League's Eastern Conference. Behind the goaltending of Martin Brodeur and the offensive abilities of players such as Patrik Elias, Scott Gomez and Brian Gionta, the Devils once again made a drive into the playoffs. It was the team's last season in Continental Airlines Arena in East Rutherford, New Jersey, as construction of the Prudential Center in Newark was completed in time for the Devils to move in for the 2007–08 season. Patrik Elias became the seventh captain in team history, following the retirement of Scott Stevens the previous season.

Brodeur, in his 13th full season of NHL play, continued his legacy as one of the winningest goaltenders in league history. On December 8, he shut out the Philadelphia Flyers to record his 462nd career victory, moving him into second place on the all-time victory list, behind Patrick Roy (551). Later in the month, on December 26, Brodeur recorded his 85th career shutout (3–0 over the Pittsburgh Penguins) to move into third place on the all-time shutout list, behind Terry Sawchuk (103) and George Hainsworth (94).

On April 2, the Devils surprisingly fired head coach Claude Julien with three games remaining in the season, despite a strong record of 47–24–8. Lou Lamoriello took over as coach afterwards.

On April 5, 2007, a win against the Philadelphia Flyers broke two records. One was the records for most wins in a season by a goaltender by Martin Brodeur with his 48th victory of the season. However, nine of those wins came via shootout. Making all things equivalent, Brodeur finished the season with 39 non-shootout wins to Bernie Parent's 47. The other being the New Jersey Devil franchise record of most wins by the team in a season with their 49th victory.

The Devils finished the regular season as Atlantic Division champions with 107 points, good for second place in the Eastern Conference. They also finished the regular season with a league-high 12 shutouts, all by Martin Brodeur.

The Devils were the most disciplined team during the regular season, with just 271 power-play opportunities against, and allowed the fewest power-play goals in the NHL, with only 40.

=== Season standings ===
Atlantic Division
No.	CR		GP	W	L	OTL	GF	GA	Pts
1	2	**New Jersey Devils**	82	49	24	9	216	201	107
2	5	**Pittsburgh Penguins**	82	47	24	11	277	246	105
3	6	**New York Rangers**	82	42	30	10	242	216	94
4	8	**New York Islanders**	82	40	30	12	248	240	92
5	15	Philadelphia Flyers	82	22	48	12	214	303	56

Note: No. = Division rank, CR = Conference rank, W = Wins, L = Losses, T = Ties, GF = Goals For, GA = Goals Against, Pts = Points
Teams that qualified for the playoffs are highlighted in bold.

Eastern Conference
R		Div	GP	W	L	OTL	GF	GA	Pts
**1**	**P -** Buffalo Sabres	**NE**	**82**	**53**	**22**	**7**	**308**	**242**	113
**2**	**Y -** New Jersey Devils	**AT**	**82**	**49**	**24**	**9**	**216**	**201**	107
**3**	**Y -** Atlanta Thrashers	**SE**	**82**	**43**	**28**	**11**	**246**	**245**	97
**4**	**X -** Ottawa Senators	**NE**	**82**	**48**	**25**	**9**	**288**	**222**	105
**5**	**X -** Pittsburgh Penguins	**AT**	**82**	**47**	**24**	**11**	**277**	**246**	105
**6**	**X -** New York Rangers	**AT**	**82**	**42**	**30**	**10**	**242**	**216**	94
**7**	**X -** Tampa Bay Lightning	**SE**	**82**	**44**	**33**	**5**	**253**	**261**	93
**8**	**X -** New York Islanders	**AT**	**82**	**40**	**30**	**12**	**248**	**240**	92
8.5
9	Toronto Maple Leafs	NE	82	40	31	11	258	269	91
10	Montreal Canadiens	NE	82	42	34	6	245	256	90
11	Carolina Hurricanes	SE	82	40	34	8	241	253	88
12	Florida Panthers	SE	82	35	31	16	247	257	86
13	Boston Bruins	NE	82	35	41	6	219	289	76
14	Washington Capitals	SE	82	28	40	14	235	286	70
15	Philadelphia Flyers	AT	82	22	48	12	214	303	56

Divisions: AT – Atlantic, NE – Northeast, SE – Southeast

P – Clinched Presidents Trophy; Y – Clinched division; X – Clinched playoff spot

== Playoffs ==
The New Jersey Devils ended the 2006–07 regular season as the Eastern Conference's second seed and faced the Tampa Bay Lightning in the first round.

On April 28, 2007, the Devils sold out the 19,040 capacity Continental Airlines Arena for the first time in the 2006–07 season in the 3–2 double overtime win against the Ottawa Senators.

The Devils' season came to an end on May 5, 2007, as they lost Game 5 of the Eastern Conference Semifinals to the Ottawa Senators 3–2, to lose the series 4–1. That defeat turned out to be the last game ever played at the Continental Airlines Arena.

== Schedule and results ==
=== Preseason ===
2006 preseason
Preseason: 3–4–0 (home: 2–1–0; road: 1–3–0)

Game	Date	Score	Opponent	Location	Record	Recap
1	September 17	5 – 0	Boston Bruins	Tsongas Arena	1–0–0	W
2	September 19	1 – 3	New York Rangers	Continental Airlines Arena	1–1–0	L
3	September 20	0 – 2	@ New York Rangers	Madison Square Garden	1–2–0	L
4	September 21	1 – 2	@ Philadelphia Flyers	Wachovia Center	1–3–0	L
5	September 24	3 – 1	@ Washington Capitals	Giant Center	2–3–0	W
6	September 28	5 – 4 (SO)	Philadelphia Flyers	Continental Airlines Arena	3–3–0	W
7	September 30	0 – 3	@ New York Islanders	Arena at Harbor Yard	3–4–0	L

Legend: W Win (2 points) L Loss (0 points) OTL Overtime/shootout loss (1 point)

=== Regular season ===
2006–07 regular season
October: 6–4–1 (home: 4–0–1; road: 2–4–0)

Game	Date	Visitor	Score	Home	OT	Decision	Attendance	Record	Pts	Recap
1	October 6	New Jersey	4 – 0	Carolina		Brodeur	18,649	1–0–0	2	W
2	October 7	New Jersey	1 – 3	Dallas		Brodeur	18,532	1–1–0	2	L
3	October 12	Toronto	6 – 7	New Jersey	SO	Brodeur	15,623	2–1–0	4	W
4	October 14	Philadelphia	2 – 3	New Jersey		Brodeur	14,177	3–1–0	6	W
5	October 16	New Jersey	2 – 4	NY Rangers		Brodeur	18,200	3–2–0	6	L
6	October 18	New Jersey	2 – 1	Pittsburgh		Brodeur	17,030	4–2–0	8	W
7	October 19	Nashville	4 – 3	New Jersey	SO	Clemmensen	11,274	4–2–1	9	OTL
8	October 21	New Jersey	1 – 8	Ottawa		Brodeur	19,166	4–3–1	9	L
9	October 24	New Jersey	2 – 4	Pittsburgh		Brodeur	13,190	4–4–1	9	L
10	October 26	Florida	0 – 2	New Jersey		Brodeur	11,594	5–4–1	11	W
11	October 28	Columbus	0 – 1	New Jersey		Brodeur	14,015	6–4–1	13	W

November: 6–5–1 (home: 4–1–0; road: 2–4–1)

Game	Date	Visitor	Score	Home	OT	Decision	Attendance	Record	Pts	Recap
12	November 2	NY Islanders	5 – 2	New Jersey		Brodeur	8,269	6–5–1	13	L
13	November 4	New Jersey	2 – 1	Montreal		Brodeur	21,273	7–5–1	15	W
14	November 7	Carolina	2 – 3	New Jersey	SO	Brodeur	10,986	8–5–1	17	W
15	November 9	Chicago	1 – 2	New Jersey	SO	Brodeur	10,978	9–5–1	19	W
16	November 11	Florida	2 – 4	New Jersey		Brodeur	14,112	10–5–1	21	W
17	November 14	New Jersey	2 – 3	NY Rangers		Brodeur	18,200	10–6–1	21	L
18	November 17	Ottawa	2 – 3	New Jersey		Brodeur	15,133	11–6–1	23	W
19	November 18	New Jersey	2 – 1	Toronto		Brodeur	19,409	12–6–1	25	W
20	November 22	New Jersey	1 – 3	Phoenix		Brodeur	12,883	12–7–1	25	L
21	November 24	New Jersey	2 – 4	Anaheim		Brodeur	16,599	12–8–1	25	L
22	November 25	New Jersey	0 – 2	San Jose		Brodeur	17,496	12–9–1	25	L
23	November 27	New Jersey	2 – 3	Los Angeles	SO	Brodeur	16,223	12–9–2	26	OTL

December: 10–4–1 (home: 5–2–1; road: 5–2–0)

Game	Date	Visitor	Score	Home	OT	Decision	Attendance	Record	Pts	Recap
24	December 1	Pittsburgh	2 – 5	New Jersey		Brodeur	13,890	13–9–2	28	W
25	December 2	New Jersey	4 – 3	Philadelphia	SO	Brodeur	19,559	14–9–2	30	W
26	December 6	Montreal	1 – 2	New Jersey	OT	Brodeur	10,986	15–9–2	32	W
27	December 8	Philadelphia	0 – 2	New Jersey		Brodeur	14,003	16–9–2	34	W
28	December 9	New Jersey	5 – 1	Boston		Brodeur	13,476	17–9–2	36	W
29	December 12	Buffalo	3 – 2	New Jersey		Brodeur	11,156	17–10–2	36	L
30	December 14	New Jersey	3 – 5	Boston		Clemmensen	11,121	17–11–2	36	L
31	December 16	Detroit	2 – 1	New Jersey		Brodeur	15,078	17–12–2	36	L
32	December 17	New Jersey	6 – 1	NY Rangers		Brodeur	18,200	18–12–2	38	W
33	December 19	Atlanta	4 – 3	New Jersey	SO	Brodeur	10,116	18–12–3	39	OTL
34	December 22	New Jersey	4 – 1	Washington		Brodeur	13,744	19–12–3	41	W
35	December 23	New Jersey	2 – 5	Atlanta		Brodeur	17,548	19–13–3	41	L
36	December 26	Pittsburgh	0 – 3	New Jersey		Brodeur	16,156	20–13–3	43	W
37	December 29	Washington	3 – 4	New Jersey		Brodeur	16,297	21–13–3	45	W
38	December 30	New Jersey	2 – 0	NY Islanders		Brodeur	16,234	22–13–3	47	W

January: 8–2–3 (home: 4–1–2; road: 4–1–1)

Game	Date	Visitor	Score	Home	OT	Decision	Attendance	Record	Pts	Recap
39	January 2	NY Rangers	3 – 2	New Jersey	SO	Brodeur	17,759	22–13–4	48	OTL
40	January 4	NY Islanders	3 – 4	New Jersey		Brodeur	12,529	23–13–4	50	W
41	January 6	New Jersey	3 – 2	Ottawa		Brodeur	19,548	24–13–4	52	W
42	January 7	New Jersey	3 – 0	Montreal		Brodeur	21,273	25–13–4	54	W
43	January 10	St. Louis	3 – 2	New Jersey		Brodeur	16,337	25–14–4	54	L
44	January 12	Atlanta	1 – 2	New Jersey		Brodeur	13,249	26–14–4	56	W
45	January 13	New Jersey	2 – 1	NY Islanders	OT	Brodeur	16,234	27–14–4	58	W
46	January 16	NY Rangers	0 – 1	New Jersey		Brodeur	18,096	28–14–4	60	W
47	January 18	Tampa Bay	3 – 2	New Jersey	SO	Brodeur	12,698	28–14–5	61	OTL
48	January 20	Philadelphia	3 – 4	New Jersey	SO	Brodeur	16,621	29–14–5	63	W
49	January 26	New Jersey	2 – 0	Tampa Bay		Brodeur	21,404	30–14–5	65	W
50	January 27	New Jersey	2 – 4	Florida		Brodeur	18,136	30–15–5	65	L
51	January 30	New Jersey	4 – 5	Atlanta	SO	Brodeur	12,162	30–15–6	66	OTL

February: 10–3–0 (home: 5–3–0; road: 5–0–0)

Game	Date	Visitor	Score	Home	OT	Decision	Attendance	Record	Pts	Recap
52	February 1	New Jersey	6 – 5	Philadelphia	OT	Brodeur	19,427	31–15–6	68	W
53	February 3	Buffalo	2 – 3	New Jersey		Brodeur	18,589	32–15–6	70	W
54	February 6	NY Rangers	2 – 3	New Jersey	SO	Brodeur	16,290	33–15–6	72	W
55	February 8	NY Islanders	0 – 2	New Jersey		Brodeur	10,110	34–15–6	74	W
56	February 11	Tampa Bay	4 – 1	New Jersey		Brodeur	18,022	34–16–6	74	L
57	February 14	Montreal	2 – 5	New Jersey		Brodeur	7,515	35–16–6	76	W
58	February 16	Pittsburgh	5 – 4	New Jersey		Brodeur	15,404	35–17–6	76	L
59	February 17	New Jersey	2 – 0	NY Islanders		Brodeur	15,223	36–17–6	78	W
60	February 20	NY Rangers	1 – 2	New Jersey		Brodeur	18,537	37–17–6	80	W
61	February 22	New Jersey	3 – 2	NY Rangers		Brodeur	18,200	38–17–6	82	W
62	February 24	Washington	4 – 2	New Jersey		Brodeur	14,301	38–18–6	82	L
63	February 25	New Jersey	3 – 2	Washington		Clemmensen	14,585	39–18–6	84	W
64	February 27	New Jersey	1 – 0	Pittsburgh		Brodeur	17,006	40–18–6	86	W

March: 6–6–2 (home: 1–3–1; road: 5–3–1)

Game	Date	Visitor	Score	Home	OT	Decision	Attendance	Record	Pts	Recap
65	March 2	Toronto	4 – 3	New Jersey	SO	Brodeur	15,095	40–18–7	87	OTL
66	March 4	Boston	4 – 1	New Jersey		Brodeur	14,254	40–19–7	87	L
67	March 6	New Jersey	4 – 5	Philadelphia	OT	Brodeur	19,210	40–19–8	88	OTL
68	March 8	New Jersey	4 – 3	Pittsburgh	SO	Brodeur	17,132	41–19–8	90	W
69	March 10	New Jersey	3 – 2	Buffalo		Brodeur	18,690	42–19–8	92	W
70	March 14	Pittsburgh	3 – 0	New Jersey		Brodeur	14,862	42–20–8	92	L
71	March 15	New Jersey	3 – 2	Carolina		Brodeur	18,279	43–20–8	94	W
72	March 17	Carolina	7 – 2	New Jersey		Brodeur	15,490	43–21–8	94	L
73	March 20	New Jersey	1 – 2	Toronto		Brodeur	19,518	43–22–8	94	L
74	March 22	New Jersey	1 – 3	Tampa Bay		Brodeur	20,326	43–23–8	94	L
75	March 24	New Jersey	4 – 3	Florida	SO	Brodeur	16,101	44–23–8	96	W
76	March 27	New Jersey	3 – 2	NY Islanders		Brodeur	13,337	45–23–8	98	W
77	March 28	New Jersey	3 – 4	Buffalo		Brodeur	18,690	45–24–8	98	L
78	March 30	Philadelphia	1 – 3	New Jersey		Brodeur	17,493	46–24–8	100	W

April: 3–0–1 (home: 2–0–1; road: 1–0–0)

Game	Date	Visitor	Score	Home	OT	Decision	Attendance	Record	Pts	Recap
79	April 1	Boston	1 – 3	New Jersey		Brodeur	14,378	47–24–8	102	W
80	April 3	Ottawa	1 – 2	New Jersey	SO	Brodeur	11,642	48–24–8	104	W
81	April 5	New Jersey	3 – 2	Philadelphia		Brodeur	19,177	49–24–8	106	W
82	April 8	NY Islanders	3 – 2	New Jersey	SO	Clemmensen	18,111	49–24–9	107	OTL

Legend: W Win (2 points) L Loss (0 points) OTL Overtime/shootout loss (1 point)

=== Playoffs ===
2007 Stanley Cup playoffs
Eastern Conference Quarterfinals vs. (7) Tampa Bay Lightning – Devils win 4–2

Game	Date	Visitor	Score	Home	OT	Decision	Attendance	Series	Recap
1	April 12	Tampa Bay	3 – 5	New Jersey		Brodeur	14,495	1 – 0	W
2	April 14	Tampa Bay	3 – 2	New Jersey		Brodeur	18,231	1 – 1	L
3	April 16	New Jersey	2 – 3	Tampa Bay		Brodeur	20,219	1 – 2	L
4	April 18	New Jersey	4 – 3	Tampa Bay	OT	Brodeur	20,940	2 – 2	W
5	April 20	Tampa Bay	0 – 3	New Jersey		Brodeur	18,096	3 – 2	W
6	April 22	New Jersey	3 – 2	Tampa Bay		Brodeur	20,019	4 – 2	W

Eastern Conference Semifinals vs. (4) Ottawa Senators – Senators win 4–1

Game	Date	Visitor	Score	Home	OT	Decision	Attendance	Series	Recap
1	April 26	Ottawa	5 – 4	New Jersey		Brodeur	15,512	0 – 1	L
2	April 28	Ottawa	2 – 3	New Jersey	2OT	Brodeur	19,040	1 – 1	W
3	April 30	New Jersey	0 – 2	Ottawa		Brodeur	19,636	1 – 2	L
4	May 2	New Jersey	2 – 3	Ottawa		Brodeur	20,248	1 – 3	L
5	May 5	Ottawa	3 – 2	New Jersey		Brodeur	19,040	1 – 4	L

Legend: W Win L Loss

== Player statistics ==
=== Scoring ===
- Position abbreviations: C = Center; D = Defense; G = Goaltender; LW = Left wing; RW = Right wing
- † = Joined team via a transaction (e.g., trade, waivers, signing) during the season. Stats reflect time with the Devils only.
- ‡ = Left team via a transaction (e.g., trade, waivers, release) during the season. Stats reflect time with the Devils only.

No.	Player	Pos	Regular season						Playoffs					
No.	Player	Pos	GP	G	A	Pts	+/-	PIM	GP	G	A	Pts	+/-	PIM
26	Patrik Elias	LW	75	21	48	69	1	38	10	1	9	10	3	4
9	Zach Parise	LW	82	31	31	62	−3	30	11	7	3	10	4	8
15	Jamie Langenbrunner	RW	82	23	37	60	−9	64	11	2	6	8	3	7
23	Scott Gomez	C	72	13	47	60	7	42	11	4	10	14	6	14
28	Brian Rafalski	D	82	8	47	55	4	34	11	2	6	8	−1	8
14	Brian Gionta	RW	62	25	20	45	−3	36	11	8	1	9	5	4
19	Travis Zajac	C	80	17	25	42	1	16	11	1	4	5	4	4
18	Sergei Brylin	LW	82	16	24	40	−5	35	11	1	2	3	−8	6
11	John Madden	C	74	12	20	32	−7	14	11	1	1	2	−6	2
20	Jay Pandolfo	LW	82	13	14	27	−5	8	11	1	0	1	−8	4
7	Paul Martin	D	82	3	23	26	−9	18	11	0	4	4	−4	6
21	Brad Lukowich	D	75	4	8	12	1	36	11	0	1	1	2	2
29	Johnny Oduya	D	76	2	9	11	−5	61	6	0	1	1	2	6
10	Erik Rasmussen	C	71	3	7	10	−3	25	11	0	0	0	−1	14
17	Mike Rupp	C	76	6	3	9	−10	92	9	0	1	1	1	7
12	Jim Dowd†	C	66	4	4	8	−5	20	11	0	0	0	−2	4
5	Colin White	D	69	0	8	8	−8	69	7	0	0	0	−4	6
6	Andy Greene	D	23	1	5	6	−1	6	11	2	1	3	6	2
27	David Clarkson	RW	7	3	1	4	−1	6	3	0	0	0	−1	2
25	Cam Janssen	RW	48	1	0	1	−2	114	—	—	—	—	—	—
30	Martin Brodeur	G	78	0	1	1		12	11	0	1	1		2
8	Alex Brooks	D	19	0	1	1	−1	4	—	—	—	—	—	—
6	Jim Fahey	D	13	0	1	1	0	2	—	—	—	—	—	—
2	David Hale‡	D	43	0	1	1	2	26	—	—	—	—	—	—
40	Scott Clemmensen	G	6	0	0	0		0	—	—	—	—	—	—
6	Mark Fraser	D	7	0	0	0	−1	7	—	—	—	—	—	—
22	Dan LaCouture	LW	6	0	0	0	0	7	—	—	—	—	—	—
24	Richard Matvichuk	D	1	0	0	0	−1	0	9	0	0	0	−4	10
22	Rod Pelley	C	9	0	0	0	−3	0	—	—	—	—	—	—
16	Tuomas Pihlman	LW	2	0	0	0	0	0	—	—	—	—	—	—
27	Barry Tallackson	RW	3	0	0	0	−1	0	—	—	—	—	—	—

=== Goaltending ===
No.	Player	Regular season										Playoffs								
No.	Player	GP	W	L	OT	SA	GA	GAA	SV%	SO	TOI	GP	W	L	SA	GA	GAA	SV%	SO	TOI
30	Martin Brodeur	78	48	23	7	2182	171	2.18	.922	12	4697	11	5	6	332	28	2.44	.916	1	688
40	Scott Clemmensen	6	1	1	2	144	16	3.14	.889	0	305	—	—	—	—	—	—	—	—	—

== Awards and records ==
=== Awards ===
Jay Pandolfo finished second in voting for the Frank J. Selke Trophy and Martin Brodeur was also a finalist for the Hart Memorial Trophy.

Type	Award/honor	Recipient	Ref
League (annual)	NHL First All-Star Team	Martin Brodeur (Goaltender)	
League (annual)	Vezina Trophy	Martin Brodeur	
League (in-season)	NHL All-Star Game selection	Martin Brodeur	
League (in-season)	NHL All-Star Game selection	Brian Rafalski	
League (in-season)	NHL First Star of the Week	Martin Brodeur (December 11)	
League (in-season)	NHL Second Star of the Week	Martin Brodeur (October 30)	
League (in-season)	NHL Second Star of the Week	Jamie Langenbrunner (February 5)	
League (in-season)	NHL Third Star of the Month	Martin Brodeur (February)	
League (in-season)	NHL YoungStars Game selection	Zach Parise	
Team	Devils' Players' Player	Jay Pandolfo	
Team	Hugh Delano Unsung Hero	Jay Pandolfo	
Team	Most Valuable Devil	Martin Brodeur	
Team	Three-Star Award	Martin Brodeur	

=== Milestones ===
Milestone	Player	Date	Ref
First game	Johnny Oduya	October 6, 2006	
First game	Travis Zajac	October 6, 2006	
First game	Alex Brooks	October 16, 2006	
First game	Mark Fraser	January 6, 2007	
First game	Andy Greene	January 12, 2007	
First game	Rod Pelley	February 1, 2007	
First game	David Clarkson	March 15, 2007	

== Transactions ==
The Devils were involved in the following transactions from June 20, 2006, the day after the deciding game of the 2006 Stanley Cup Finals, through June 6, 2007, the day of the deciding game of the 2007 Stanley Cup Finals.

=== Trades ===
Date	Details		Ref
June 24, 2006	To St. Louis Blues: 1st-round pick in 2006	To New Jersey Devils: 1st-round pick in 2006; 3rd-round pick in 2006	
October 1, 2006	To San Jose Sharks: Vladimir Malakhov; Conditional 1st-round pick in 2007	To New Jersey Devils: Jim Fahey; Alexander Korolyuk	
February 16, 2007 (Note: This trade was voided on February 23 since Korolyuk did not report to San Jose and remained in Russia.)	To San Jose Sharks: Alexander Korolyuk	To New Jersey Devils: Conditional 3rd-round pick in 2007	
February 27, 2007	To Calgary Flames: David Hale; 5th-round pick in 2007	To New Jersey Devils: 3rd-round pick in 2007	
February 28, 2007	To Minnesota Wild: Aaron Voros	To New Jersey Devils: 7th-round pick in 2008	

=== Players acquired ===
Date	Player	Former team	Term	Via	Ref
July 10, 2006	Mike Rupp	Columbus Blue Jackets	1-year	Free agency	
July 14, 2006	Jordan Parise	University of North Dakota (WCHA)		Free agency	
July 24, 2006	Tomas Harant	HC Ceske Budejovice (ELH)		Free agency	
July 24, 2006	Mike Mottau	Peoria Rivermen (AHL)		Free agency	
July 24, 2006	Johnny Oduya	Frolunda HC (SHL)		Free agency	
July 24, 2006	Rod Pelley	Ohio State University (CCHA)		Free agency	
August 2, 2006	Olli Malmivaara	SaiPa (Liiga)		Free agency	
August 10, 2006	Justin Papineau	New York Islanders		Free agency	
October 4, 2006	Dan LaCouture	Boston Bruins		Free agency	
November 2, 2006	Jim Dowd	Colorado Avalanche	1-year	Free agency	

=== Players lost ===
Date	Player	New team	Via (Note: In parentheses is the player's free agency group on July 1 if applicable.)	Ref
July 1, 2006	Tommy Albelin (Note: Albelin retired.)		Contract expiration (III)	
July 1, 2006	Darren Langdon (Note: Langdon retired.)		Contract expiration (III)	
July 1, 2006	Krzysztof Oliwa (Note: Oliwa retired.)		Contract expiration (III)	
July 17, 2006	Bobby Allen	Boston Bruins	Free agency (VI)	
July 24, 2006	Ken Klee	Colorado Avalanche	Free agency (III)	
July 27, 2006	Brad Ference	Calgary Flames	Free agency (UFA)	
August 30, 2006	Krisjanis Redlihs	HC Fribourg-Gotteron (NLA)	Free agency (VI)	
September 5, 2006	Ahren Nittel	HC Davos (NLA)	Free agency (UFA)	
September 13, 2006	Viktor Kozlov	New York Islanders	Free agency (III)	
September 15, 2006	Matt DeMarchi	HC Sibir Novosibirsk (RSL)	Free agency (UFA)	

=== Signings ===
Date	Player	Term	Contract type	Ref
July 1, 2006	Jamie Langenbrunner	5-year	Re-signing	
July 3, 2006	Patrik Elias	7-year	Re-signing	
July 10, 2006	Colin White	6-year	Re-signing	
July 25, 2006	Scott Gomez	1-year	Arbitration award	
September 11, 2006	Tuomas Pihlman		Re-signing	
September 16, 2006	Aaron Voros		Re-signing	
October 3, 2006	Scott Clemmensen	1-year	Re-signing	
October 3, 2006	Brian Gionta	3-year	Re-signing	
October 3, 2006	David Hale	1-year	Re-signing	
October 3, 2006	Paul Martin	1-year	Re-signing	
October 3, 2006	Erik Rasmussen	1-year	Re-signing	

== Draft picks ==
The Devils' picks at the 2006 NHL entry draft in Vancouver, British Columbia.

Rd #	Pick #	Player	Nat	Pos	Team (League)	Notes
1	30	Matt Corrente	Canada	D	Saginaw Spirit (OHL)	(Note: The Devils acquired the Carolina Hurricanes' 2006 first-round draft pick (Corrente) and the Vancouver Canucks' third-round pick (Zharkov) from St. Louis for the Devils' 2006 first-round pick (used on Patrik Berglund) on June 24, 2006.)
2	58	Alexander Vasyunov	Russia	LW	Lokomotiv Yaroslavl (RSL)	
3	67	Kirill Tulupov	Russia	D	Almetyevsk Neftyanik (Vysshaya Liga)	(Note: The Devils acquired the 2006 third-round pick from Washington for Jeff Friesen on September 26, 2005.)
3	77	Vladimir Zharkov	Russia	RW	CSKA Moscow (RSL)	(Note: The Devils had traded their original 2006 third-round pick (later transferred to Phoenix and used on Jonas Ahnelov) to the New York Islanders for Brad Lukowich on March 9, 2006.)
4	107	T. J Miller	United States	D	Penticton Vees (BCHL)	(Note: The Devils acquired the 2006 fourth-round pick from Vancouver for Sean Brown on March 9, 2006. The Devils had traded their original fourth-round pick (used on Hugo Carpentier) to Calgary for Jason Wiemer on March 9, 2006.)
5	148	Olivier Magnan	Canada	D	Rouyn-Noranda Huskies (QMJHL)	
6	178	Tony Romano	United States	C	New York Bobcats (AJHL)	
7	208	Kyell Henegan	Canada	D	Shawinigan Cataractes (QMJHL)	

== Media ==
Television coverage was still on Fox Sports Network with Mike Emrick calling the play-by-play and Chico Resch serving the color commentator. Meanwhile, Steve Cangialosi handled the studio hosting duties. Radio coverage was still on WFAN 660, but this time, former television color commentator Matt Loughlin took the position as radio play-by-play announcer. Also, in this season, Sherry Ross returns to be the radio color commentator.

== See also ==
- 2006–07 NHL season
