= Jay Pandolfo =

American ice hockey player and coach

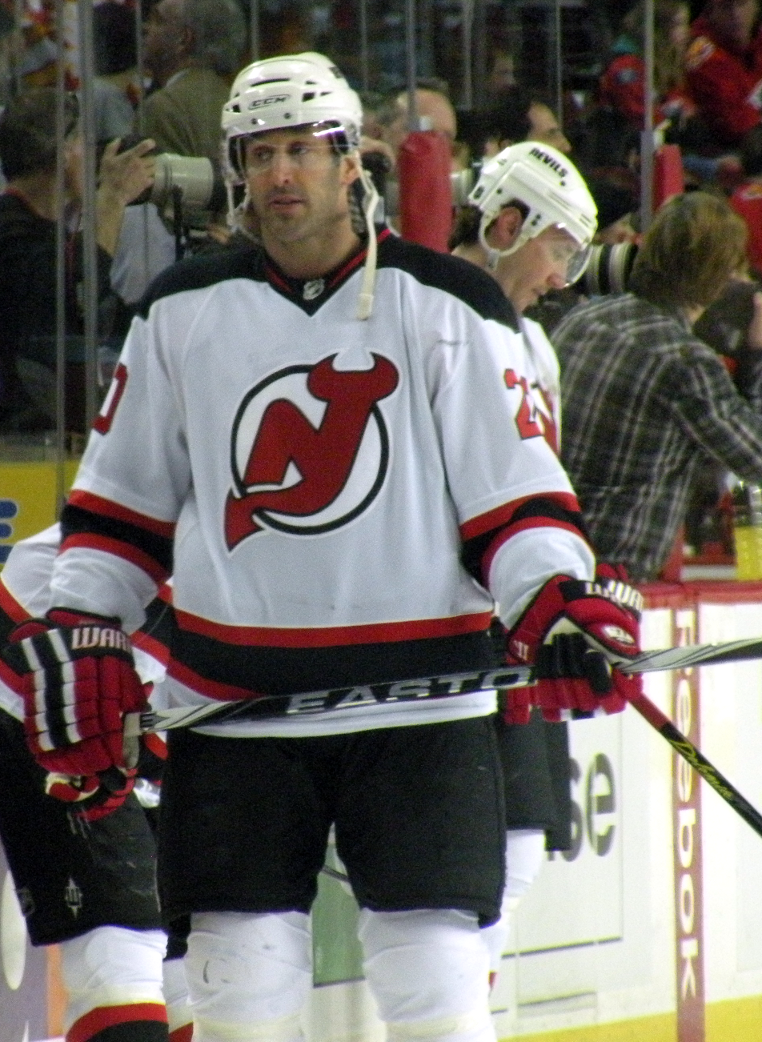
- Pandolfo during his tenure with the New Jersey Devils
- Born: December 27, 1974 (age 51) Winchester, Massachusetts, U.S.
- Height: 6 ft 1 in (185 cm)
- Weight: 190 lb (86 kg; 13 st 8 lb)
- Position: Left wing
- Shot: Left
- Played for: New Jersey Devils; New York Islanders; Boston Bruins
- National team: United States
- NHL draft: 32nd overall, 1993; New Jersey Devils
- Playing career: 1996–2014
- Coaching career

Current position
- Title: Head coach
- Team: Boston University
- Conference: Hockey East

Biographical details
- Education: Boston University ('96)

Coaching career (HC unless noted)
- 2014–2016: Boston Bruins (development)
- 2016–2021: Boston Bruins (assistant)
- 2021–2022: Boston University (associate)
- 2022–present: Boston University

Head coaching record
- Overall: 81–35–4 (.692)
- Tournaments: 7–3 (.700)

Jay Paul Pandolfo (born December 27, 1974) is an American college ice hockey coach and former professional forward. He is currently the head coach of the Boston University Terriers.

He spent most of his National Hockey League career with the New Jersey Devils before playing the 2011–12 season with the New York Islanders and the 2012–13 season with the Boston Bruins. His younger brother Mike was also once a member of the Devils organization, and played briefly in the NHL.

== Playing career ==
Pandolfo grew up in Burlington, Massachusetts and played hockey for Burlington High School, where he graduated in 1992.

He was a member of the Burlington Hockey and Skating Association's Massachusetts state champion team in 1989 for the Bantam age group. This team went on to place fifth in the US National tournament in Chicago.

Pandolfo was drafted by the New Jersey Devils 32nd overall in the 1993 NHL entry draft after his first season at Boston University. Pandolfo would play three more seasons as a star player at BU. He played 133 games there, scoring 78 goals and 89 assists for 167 points. In his last season, he led Hockey East in goals with 38 and was named to the NCAA All-American Team, as well as being named the Hockey East Player of the Year.

It took Pandolfo two more seasons to become a regular with New Jersey, and his first full season in 1998–99 was one of his two best, scoring 14 goals and 27 points in 70 games. Pandolfo won two Stanley Cups with the Devils in 2000 and 2003. His best playoff season was in 2003 when he scored 6 goals and 12 points in 24 games.

During the NHL lockout in 2005 he was the assistant varsity coach for Burlington High School, in Burlington, Massachusetts.

Pandolfo became a Frank J. Selke Trophy finalist for the first time following the 2006–07 season. He served as one of four alternate captains for the Devils for the 2006–2007 and 2007–2008 seasons. Pandolfo netted his first career NHL hat trick against the Tampa Bay Lightning, in a 6–1 Devils win on October 31, 2007, which was also the first-ever hat trick and first-ever home victory for the Devils at the Prudential Center.

On November 30, 2007, Pandolfo's 307 consecutive games streak came to an end after suffering a pelvic injury when crashing into the boards in the Devils previous game. He had the fourth-longest streak in franchise history with Travis Zajac holding the record at more than 389 games.

The day before the free-agent signing period opened on June 30, 2010, the Devils parted ways with Pandolfo, placing him on waivers and then buying out his contract.

On September 3, 2011, Pandolfo accepted an invite to the New York Islanders training camp on a tryout basis. On October 4, 2011, Pandolfo signed with the Islanders for one-year. During the 2011–12 season on November 17, Pandolfo scored his 100th NHL goal in a game against the Montreal Canadiens.

On January 11, 2013, Pandolfo was invited to the Boston Bruins training camp on a pro tryout basis. He practiced with their AHL affiliate, the Providence Bruins and on February 17, 2013 he was called up to play against the Winnipeg Jets. He played 18 games for the Boston Bruins.

On January 30, 2014, Pandolfo announced his retirement.

== Hockey camp ==
Pandolfo runs a hockey camp in Andover, Massachusetts, along with former New Jersey Devils teammate Scott Gomez.

== Coaching career ==
From 2014-2016, Pandolfo was a development coach for the Bruins. On May 14, 2016, he was named the assistant coach. He held this role until July 2021 where he left the Bruins and decided to assistant coach his alma mater, Boston University. On May 5, 2022, Pandolfo was announced as the next head coach of the Terriers.

== Career statistics ==
=== Regular season and playoffs ===
			Regular season					Playoffs
Season	Team	League	GP	G	A	Pts	PIM	GP	G	A	Pts	PIM
1989–90	Burlington High School	HS-MA	23	33	30	63	18	—	—	—	—	—
1990–91	Burlington High School	HS-MA	20	19	27	46	10	—	—	—	—	—
1991–92	Burlington High School	HS-MA	20	35	34	69	14	—	—	—	—	—
1992–93	Boston University	HE	37	16	22	38	16	—	—	—	—	—
1993–94	Boston University	HE	37	17	25	42	27	—	—	—	—	—
1994–95	Boston University	HE	20	7	13	20	6	—	—	—	—	—
1995–96	Boston University	HE	39	38	29	67	6	—	—	—	—	—
1995–96	Albany River Rats	AHL	5	3	1	4	0	3	0	0	0	0
1996–97	Albany River Rats	AHL	12	3	9	12	0	—	—	—	—	—
1996–97	New Jersey Devils	NHL	46	6	8	14	6	6	0	1	1	0
1997–98	Albany River Rats	AHL	51	18	19	37	24	—	—	—	—	—
1997–98	New Jersey Devils	NHL	23	1	3	4	4	3	0	2	2	0
1998–99	New Jersey Devils	NHL	70	14	13	27	10	7	1	0	1	0
1999–2000	New Jersey Devils	NHL	71	7	8	15	4	23	0	5	5	0
2000–01	New Jersey Devils	NHL	63	4	12	16	16	25	1	4	5	4
2001–02	New Jersey Devils	NHL	65	4	10	14	15	6	0	0	0	0
2002–03	New Jersey Devils	NHL	68	6	11	17	23	24	6	6	12	2
2003–04	New Jersey Devils	NHL	82	13	13	26	14	5	0	0	0	0
2004–05	EC Red Bull Salzburg	EBEL	19	5	7	12	0	—	—	—	—	—
2005–06	New Jersey Devils	NHL	82	10	10	20	16	9	1	4	5	0
2006–07	New Jersey Devils	NHL	82	13	14	27	8	11	1	0	1	4
2007–08	New Jersey Devils	NHL	54	12	12	24	22	5	0	0	0	2
2008–09	New Jersey Devils	NHL	61	5	5	10	10	7	1	0	1	0
2009–10	New Jersey Devils	NHL	52	4	5	9	6	—	—	—	—	—
2010–11	Springfield Falcons	AHL	12	2	4	6	4	—	—	—	—	—
2011–12	New York Islanders	NHL	62	1	2	3	8	—	—	—	—	—
2012–13	Boston Bruins	NHL	18	0	0	0	2	—	—	—	—	—
NHL totals			899	100	126	226	164	131	11	22	33	12

=== International ===
Year	Team	Event	GP	G	A	Pts	PIM
1994	United States	WJC	7	0	0	0	2
1999	United States	WC	2	0	0	0	0
Junior totals			7	0	0	0	2
Senior totals			2	0	0	0	0

== Awards and honors ==
Award	Year
All-Hockey East All-Star	1995–96
AHCA East First-Team All-American	1995–96
NCAA College Hockey Champion	1995
Hockey East All-Tournament Team	1996
NHL Stanley Cup champion	2000, 2003

== Head coaching record ==
Record table
Season	Team	Overall	Conference	Standing	Postseason
Boston University Terriers (Hockey East) (2022–present)
2022–23	Boston University	29–11–0	18–6–0	1st	NCAA Frozen Four
2023–24	Boston University	28–10–2	18–4–2	2nd	NCAA Frozen Four
2024–25	Boston University	24–14–2	14–8–2	3rd	NCAA Runner-up
Boston University:		81–35–4	50–18–4		
Total:		81–35–4			
National champion Postseason invitational champion Conference regular season champion Conference regular season and conference tournament champion Division regular season champion Division regular season and conference tournament champion Conference tournament champion

Awards and achievements
Preceded by Chris Imes	Hockey East Player of the Year; 1995–96	Succeeded by Chris Drury
