= Scott Gomez =

American ice hockey player and coach

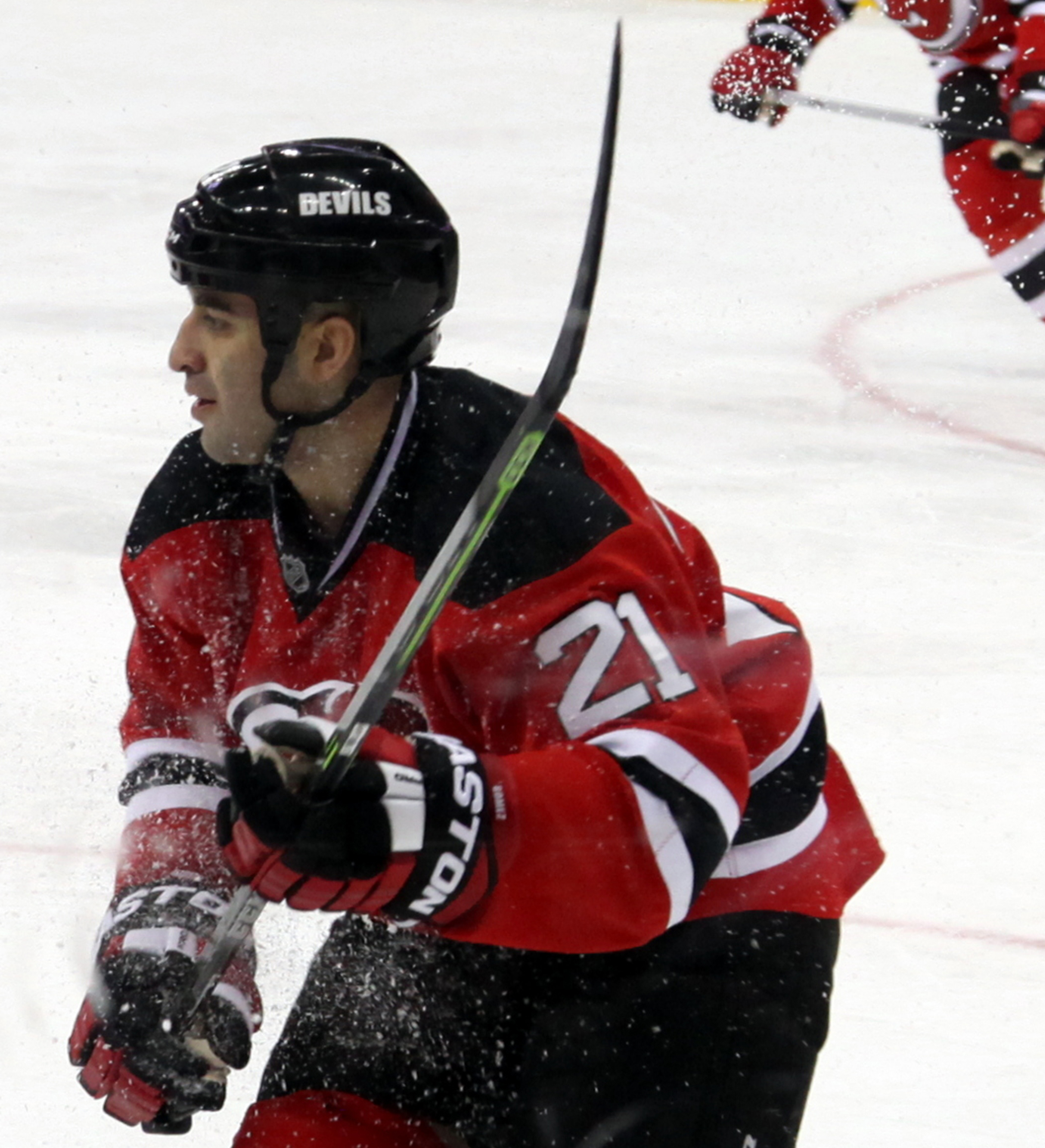
- Gomez with the New Jersey Devils in 2015
- Born: December 23, 1979 (age 46) Anchorage, Alaska, U.S.
- Height: 5 ft 11 in (180 cm)
- Weight: 200 lb (91 kg; 14 st 4 lb)
- Position: Center
- Shot: Left
- Played for: New Jersey Devils; New York Rangers; Montreal Canadiens; San Jose Sharks; Florida Panthers; St. Louis Blues; Ottawa Senators
- National team: United States
- NHL draft: 27th overall, 1998; New Jersey Devils
- Playing career: 1999–2016

Scott Carlos Gomez (born December 23, 1979) is an American ice hockey coach and former player. He is the current head coach of the Chicago Steel of the United States Hockey League (USHL).

He was the assistant coach for the New York Islanders of the National Hockey League (NHL). Gomez had previously played in the NHL with the New Jersey Devils, New York Rangers, Montreal Canadiens, San Jose Sharks, Florida Panthers, St. Louis Blues and Ottawa Senators.

== Playing career ==
=== New Jersey Devils ===
In the 1998 NHL entry draft, Gomez was selected with the 27th pick of the first round by the New Jersey Devils. At the time, he was playing for the Tri-City Americans of the Western Hockey League (WHL) and had just been named to the WHL's All-Rookie team. He also played for the Alaska Aces. In the season after he was drafted, he justified the Devils' decision by scoring 108 points in 58 games for the Americans. This earned him a spot on the WHL West First All-Star Team.

The previous year, Gomez led the South Surrey Eagles of the Tier II Junior "A" British Columbia Hockey League to the gold medal game of the 1997 Royal Bank Cup against the hometown Summerside Western Capitals; Gomez and his South Surrey Eagles were defeated 4–3.

After this impressive WHL performance, Gomez was brought to New Jersey for the 1999–2000 NHL season, making him the first Alaska-born NHL player. In his rookie NHL season, he had 51 assists and 70 points for the Devils. For his efforts, he was awarded the Calder Memorial Trophy as the league's top rookie and played in the NHL All-Star Game in Toronto. Gomez scored 10 points in the 2000 playoffs as the Devils won their second Stanley Cup.

In his sophomore season, Gomez totaled 63 points. The Devils again made their way to the Stanley Cup Final, but were defeated by the Colorado Avalanche in seven games. In the 2001–02 season, Gomez's numbers dropped, as he scored just 10 goals and 48 points. The Devils bowed out of the playoffs in the first round that season, losing to the Carolina Hurricanes. Gomez did not play a game in that series due to injury. The 2002–03 season, however, was an improvement for Gomez and the Devils. Gomez tallied 55 points and again helped the Devils win the Stanley Cup, this time scoring 12 points during the playoffs. The 2003–04 season was an even better year for Gomez, as he scored 70 points, the most since his rookie year. He also tied for the NHL lead in assists, with 56. However, the Devils lost in the first round of the playoffs to the Philadelphia Flyers.

During the NHL lockout that forced the cancellation of the 2004–05 season, Gomez initially went to Russia, but ultimately decided to return to his native hometown of Anchorage, Alaska, and played for the Alaska Aces of the ECHL. Throughout the season, "Scotty" was the face of the Alaska franchise, as well as the ECHL; he led the ECHL in scoring and won league Most Valuable Player honors. Gomez's season ended early when he was seriously injured by Bakersfield Condors enforcer Ashlee Langdone, who checked him into an open bench door during Game 4 of the Pacific Division Semifinals. Gomez sustained a broken pelvis from the incident.

Despite the lockout, Gomez returned to form in 2005–06 and set career highs in goals scored and points, tallying a total of 33 goals and 84 points. He would never reach 20 goals in a season again, let alone 30. Along with linemates Brian Gionta, Patrik Eliáš and, before Eliáš' comeback, Zach Parise, Gomez helped rally the Devils from a poor beginning of the season by finishing the season on an 11-game winning streak and clinching the division title in the last game. Gomez finished the 2006 Stanley Cup playoffs with five goals and four assists in nine games. On July 25, 2006, Devils General Manager Lou Lamoriello accepted an arbitrator's ruling of a $5 million, one-year contract for Gomez for the 2006–07 season. Hence, he would go on to be an unrestricted free agent in the summer of 2007. During the 2006–07 season, he led the Devils to the second round of the playoffs and totalled 60 points.

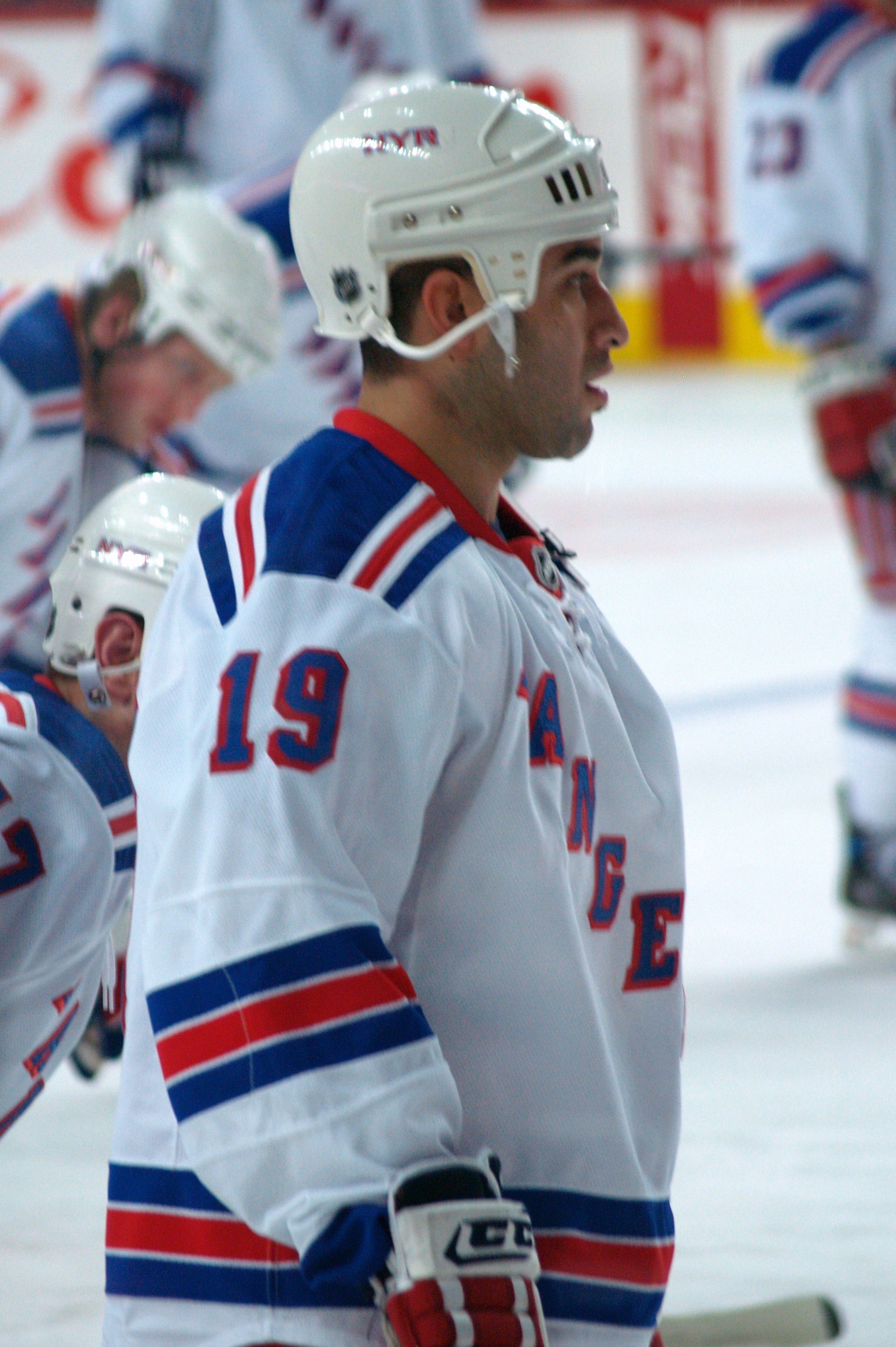
Gomez with the New York Rangers in 2008.

=== New York Rangers ===
On July 1, 2007, Gomez signed a $51.5 million, seven-year contract with the New York Rangers. On the same day, the Rangers signed Chris Drury, who also wears the number 23. To settle who would wear number 23 while playing for the Rangers, a puck was flipped, with Drury winning and earning the right to continue wearing number 23, while Gomez changed his number to 19. Coincidentally, Drury won the Calder Memorial Trophy the year before Gomez won the same award. When asked about his decision to leave the Devils, Gomez said, "I think it's more that New Jersey and I didn't really talk much… …Both sides were ready to move on. They're a tremendous organization. So many memories, what can I say? Everything I have and everything I've done is because of them. But I think at the end of the day, it was time."

Gomez faced his former club for the first time at Prudential Center on November 14, 2007. Each time Gomez touched the puck, he was severely booed by Devils fans. The Rangers went on to win 4-2 that night, with Gomez piling up two assists in the game.

On February 1, 2008, in a game against his former club, the Devils, Gomez recorded his 500th career point by assisting on a Chris Drury goal.

In the first round of the 2008 Stanley Cup playoffs, Gomez and the Rangers faced the Devils, where he scored two goals and four assists, en route to a 4–1 series victory. However, the Rangers fell to the eventual Eastern Conference Champion Pittsburgh Penguins in the second round 4–1.

On October 1, 2008, Gomez and the New York Rangers won the Victoria Cup by beating Metallurg Magnitogorsk by the score of 4–3. On October 3, 2008, Gomez was named an alternate captain of the New York Rangers.

=== Montreal Canadiens ===
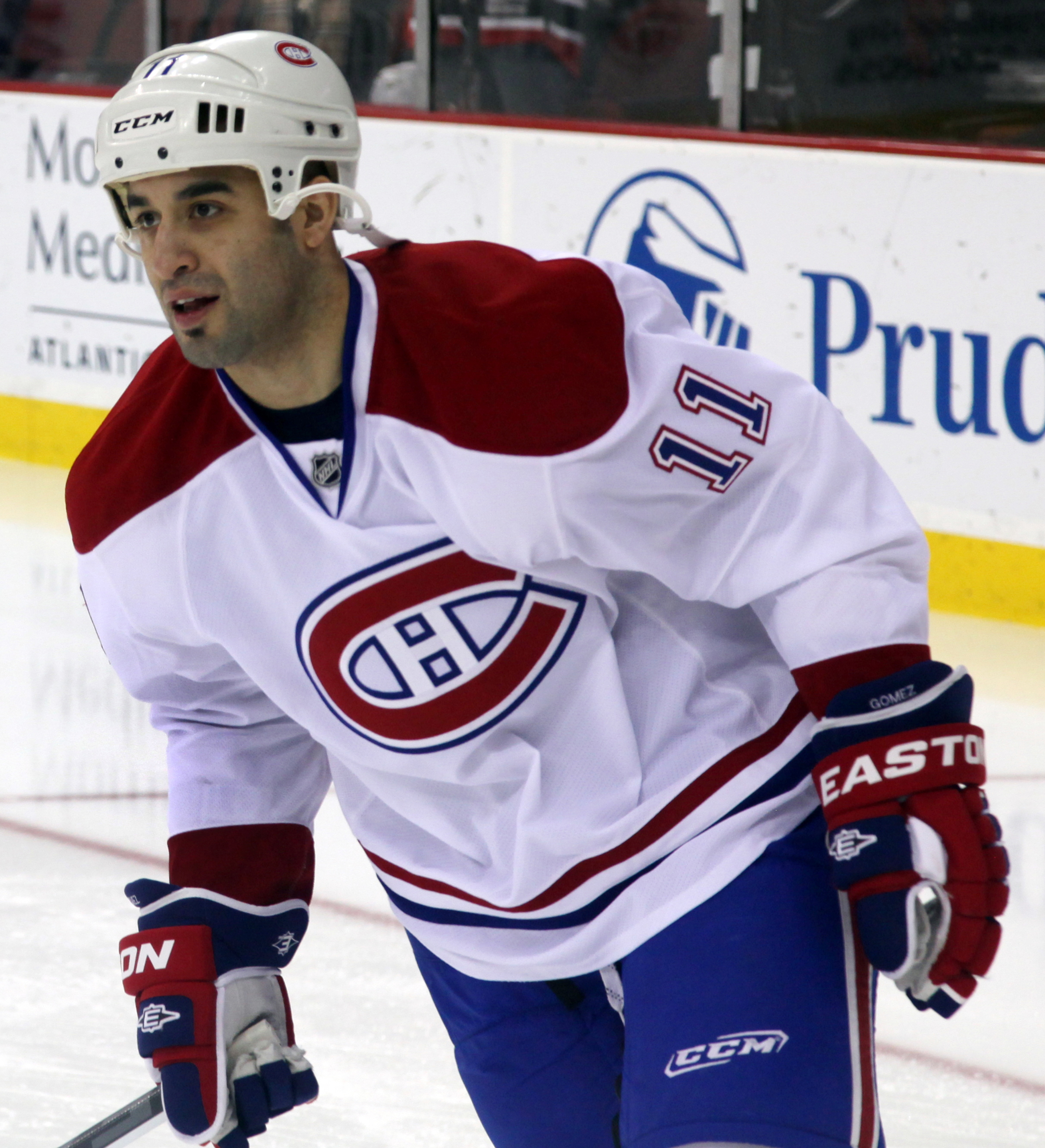
Gomez in February 2012 during his tenure with the Montreal Canadiens.

On June 30, 2009, Gomez was traded by the Rangers, along with Tom Pyatt and Michael Busto, to the Montreal Canadiens in exchange for Chris Higgins, Doug Janik, Ryan McDonagh and Pavel Valentenko.

The trade reunited Gomez with former Devils teammate Brian Gionta, who signed with the Canadiens after the Gomez trade. Montreal's acquisition of Gomez drew considerable attention and criticism across various news sources largely because of his lack of production since signing his contract, one of the longest and highest in the NHL. With the Canadiens, Gomez wore the number 91 for the 2009–10 season (a reverse of number 19) as his former two numbers are retired by the Canadiens organization (number 19 of Larry Robinson and the number 23 of Bob Gainey).

For the start of the 2010–11 season, Gomez decided to switch his number from 91 to 11 (previously worn by long-time Canadiens captain Saku Koivu). Gomez decided to wear number 11 because he wore it during his childhood.

During the 2010–11 season, on February 5, 2011, Gomez scored a goal which would be his last for more than a year. During this time, the Canadiens played in 90 games, although Gomez missed 30 of these games in the 2011–12 season. Of the games he played in, Gomez failed to score in the final 29 games of the 2010–11 season, the preceding seven-game playoff series against the Boston Bruins and the first 24 games he played in during the 2011–12 season – a total scoreless drought of 60 games. Gomez had 22 assists and had a plus-minus rating of −15 while registering 122 shots on goal during this period. The drought ended on February 9, 2012, with a one-timer goal during a 4–2 victory over the New York Islanders.

==== 2012–13 lockout ====
Due to the 2012–13 lockout, Gomez followed his previous steps and opted a return to the Alaska Aces of the ECHL. Initially on a training basis only with the Aces, Gomez signed to play in 2012–13 season, posting 13 points in 11 games.

When the lockout was settled, the new collective bargaining agreement (CBA) directly affected Gomez in two ways — first, it forced teams to count any American Hockey League (AHL) player's salary above $900,000 against its NHL cap, meaning the Canadiens could not "bury" Gomez's salary by sending him to their AHL affiliate, as had been previously done with players such as Wade Redden, to clear cap room. Second, it allowed for up to two contracts per team to be bought out for up to two-thirds of the remaining salary, without the buyout counting against the cap in the 2013 and/or 2014 off-seasons, so as to help teams get under the reduced cap.

However, the buyouts could not be used on injured players, so, to avoid any risk of a hockey-related injury, on January 13, 2013, the first day of the Canadiens training camp, Gomez was directed by General Manager Marc Bergevin to stay home for the shortened season to ensure a buy-out at the end of the season.

While this meant that Gomez (along with Wade Redden who, due to the provision regarding AHL salaries, was in a similar situation) would still have been paid his pro-rated 2012–13 salary despite not playing, the NHL Players' Association (NHLPA) was concerned that Gomez and Redden being forced to spend an entire year away from hockey would adversely affect their ability to find employment elsewhere in the NHL during the 2013 off-season, even at a much reduced salary.

On January 15, in order to avoid this process, the CBA was revised to allow teams to use one of their two compliance buyouts prior to the start of the shortened 2013 season, with the provision that the players bought out in such a way would still be paid their pro-rated but otherwise full 2012–13 salaries (which would still count against the 2012–13 cap), and with the buyout of the subsequent years otherwise proceeding as originally intended.

With the revised agreement in place, Gomez was promptly placed on unconditional waivers and bought-out, becoming a free agent on January 17, 2013.

=== San Jose Sharks & Florida Panthers ===
On January 23, 2013, Gomez signed a one-year, $700,000 contract with the San Jose Sharks. Playing in 39 games for the Sharks, Gomez recorded two goals and 13 assists.

On July 31, 2013, Gomez signed a one-year contract with the Florida Panthers. Playing in 46 games for the Panthers, Gomez scored just two goals to go with 10 assists.

=== Return to New Jersey, St. Louis Blues and Hershey Bears ===
Gomez returned to familiar grounds in attending the New Jersey Devils' training camp for the 2014–15 season on an unsigned try-out basis. On December 1, 2014, the Devils signed him to a one-year contract. On December 28, 2014, he participated in his 1,000th NHL game. Gomez rediscovered his scoring touch with the Devils, amassing his best offensive output since 2011, finishing third amongst the Devils with 34 points in 58 games.

With the Devils signalling an end of an era through managerial changes and with the intent to build a younger roster, Gomez was not tendered a new contract by the Devils. As a free agent, Gomez again accepted a try-out basis contract to attend the St. Louis Blues training camp for the 2015–16 season on August 27, 2015. On October 7, he signed a one-year two-way contract with the Blues worth $575,000 to begin the 2015–16 season. Gomez was used primarily on the powerplay with the Blues, and contributed with 8 points in 21 games. With the club returning to health and in need of roster positions, on December 29, 2015, he was placed on waivers by the team. Upon clearing, Gomez requested a release from his contract with the Blues and was placed on unconditional waivers by the Blues in order to return to free agency.

Gomez continued his season in the new-year by signing with the Hershey Bears of the AHL, an affiliate to the Washington Capitals, on a professional try-out contract on January 14, 2016. Gomez exercised the release from his tryout contract on March 1, 2016.

=== Ottawa Senators ===
After the Senators' first line center Kyle Turris was placed on injury reserve, Gomez was signed as an unrestricted free agent by the Ottawa Senators for $575,000 on March 2, 2016.

On August 31, 2016, Gomez announced his retirement from professional hockey.

== Coaching career ==
On May 30, 2017, Gomez was named as the assistant coach for the New York Islanders of the National Hockey League (NHL). Following the 2018–19 season, Gomez elected not to return to the Islanders bench.

In August 2023, Gomez was named assistant coach for the Surrey Eagles in the British Columbia Hockey League.

In June 2025, Gomez was named Head coach for the Chicago Steel in the United States Hockey League

== Web show ==
Gomez has a web show on YouTube entitled, "Scotty's House" that first premiered on July 30, 2020. This series focuses on Gomez having adventures in his house in Alaska.

== Career statistics ==
=== Regular season and playoffs ===
			Regular season					Playoffs
Season	Team	League	GP	G	A	Pts	PIM	GP	G	A	Pts	PIM
1994–95	East Anchorage High School	HS-AK	28	30	48	78	—	—	—	—	—	—
1995–96	East Anchorage High School	HS-AK	27	56	49	105	—	—	—	—	—	—
1995–96	Anchorage North Stars AAA	Midget	40	67	70	137	44	—	—	—	—	—
1996–97	South Surrey Eagles	BCHL	56	48	76	124	94	21	18	23	41	57
1997–98	Tri-City Americans	WHL	45	12	37	49	57	—	—	—	—	—
1998–99	Tri-City Americans	WHL	58	30	78	108	55	10	6	13	19	31
1999–00	New Jersey Devils	NHL	82	19	51	70	78	23	4	6	10	4
2000–01	New Jersey Devils	NHL	76	14	49	63	46	25	5	9	14	24
2001–02	New Jersey Devils	NHL	76	10	38	48	36	—	—	—	—	—
2002–03	New Jersey Devils	NHL	80	13	42	55	48	24	3	9	12	2
2003–04	New Jersey Devils	NHL	80	14	56	70	70	5	0	6	6	0
2004–05	Alaska Aces	ECHL	61	13	73	86	69	4	1	3	4	4
2005–06	New Jersey Devils	NHL	82	33	51	84	42	9	5	4	9	6
2006–07	New Jersey Devils	NHL	72	13	47	60	42	11	4	10	14	14
2007–08	New York Rangers	NHL	81	16	54	70	36	10	4	7	11	8
2008–09	New York Rangers	NHL	77	16	42	58	60	7	2	3	5	4
2009–10	Montreal Canadiens	NHL	78	12	47	59	60	19	2	12	14	25
2010–11	Montreal Canadiens	NHL	80	7	31	38	48	7	0	4	4	2
2011–12	Montreal Canadiens	NHL	38	2	9	11	14	—	—	—	—	—
2012–13	Alaska Aces	ECHL	11	6	7	13	12	—	—	—	—	—
2012–13	San Jose Sharks	NHL	39	2	13	15	22	9	0	2	2	6
2013–14	Florida Panthers	NHL	46	2	10	12	24	—	—	—	—	—
2014–15	New Jersey Devils	NHL	58	7	27	34	23	—	—	—	—	—
2015–16	St. Louis Blues	NHL	21	1	7	8	4	—	—	—	—	—
2015–16	Hershey Bears	AHL	18	4	20	24	0	—	—	—	—	—
2015–16	Ottawa Senators	NHL	13	0	1	1	2	—	—	—	—	—
NHL totals			1,079	181	575	756	655	149	29	72	101	95

=== International ===
Year	Team	Event	Result	GP	G	A	Pts	PIM
1998	United States	WJC	5th	7	1	0	1	2
1999	United States	WJC	8th	6	3	7	10	4
2004	United States	WCH	SF	7	2	1	3	2
2006	United States	OG	8th	6	1	4	5	10
Junior totals				13	4	7	11	6
Senior totals				11	2	7	9	10

== Awards and achievements ==
Award	Year
BCHL
Bruce Allison Memorial Trophy	1997
Abbott Cup	1997
Doyle Cup	1997
Mowat Cup	1997
Fred Page Cup	1997
CJHL
Top Forward	1997
WHL
All-Rookie team	1998
First All-Star Team	1999
NHL
All-Rookie team	2000
All-Star Game	2000, 2008
Calder Memorial Trophy	2000
Stanley Cup champion	2000, 2003
ECHL
Leading Scorer Award	2005
CCM TACKS Most Valuable Player	2005
New York Rangers
Victoria Cup	2008

== See also ==
- List of NHL players with 1,000 games played

Preceded by Mike Van Ryn	New Jersey Devils first-round draft pick 1998	Succeeded by Ari Ahonen
Preceded by Chris Drury	Winner of the Calder Memorial Trophy; 2000	Succeeded by Evgeni Nabokov
