= 2006–07 Boston Bruins season =

NHL team season

2006–07 Boston Bruins
- Division: 5th Northeast
- Conference: 13th Eastern
- 2006–07 record: 35–41–6
- Home record: 18–19–4
- Road record: 17–22–2
- Goals for: 219
- Goals against: 289

Team information
- General manager: Peter Chiarelli
- Coach: Dave Lewis
- Captain: Zdeno Chara
- Alternate captains: Patrice Bergeron; Glen Murray
- Arena: TD Banknorth Garden
- Average attendance: 14,764 (84.1%)
- Minor league affiliate: Providence Bruins

Team leaders
- Goals: Glen Murray (28)
- Assists: Marc Savard (74)
- Points: Marc Savard (96)
- Penalty minutes: Andrew Alberts (124)
- Plus/minus: Andrew Ference (+5)
- Wins: Tim Thomas (30)
- Goals against average: Joey MacDonald (3.12)

The 2006–07 Boston Bruins season, the franchise's 83rd, saw the team working toward improving on a 2005–06 season which saw them finish with the third-worst record in the Eastern Conference. The Bruins missed the playoffs for the second consecutive seasons for the first time since the 1999–2000 season and the 2000–01 season. It would also be the last time the Bruins finish with a losing record until 2024-25.

== Offseason ==
On May 26, Peter Chiarelli was named general manager. Head coach Mike Sullivan was fired on June 27 and replaced two days later by former Detroit Red Wings head coach Dave Lewis.

Forward Marc Savard and defenceman Zdeno Chara were major additions to the team via free agency. At the same time, goaltender Tim Thomas took over the starting job after Andrew Raycroft was traded to the Toronto Maple Leafs in the off-season. Chara was named the 18th captain in team history on October 4.

== Regular season ==
Phil Kessel, the team's first-round pick in the 2006 NHL entry draft, immediately entered the lineup. However, he was lost from the roster in mid-December when he was diagnosed with a form of testicular cancer. Kessel's cancer proved to be operable and was removed, and he returned to the Bruins' lineup on January 9, less than a month after his diagnosis.

The Bruins finished the regular season having allowed the most shorthanded goals in the NHL, with 18.

=== Season standings ===
Northeast Division
No.	CR		GP	W	L	OTL	GF	GA	Pts
1	1	**Buffalo Sabres**	82	53	22	7	308	242	113
2	4	**Ottawa Senators**	82	48	25	9	288	222	105
3	9	Toronto Maple Leafs	82	40	31	11	258	269	91
4	10	Montreal Canadiens	82	42	34	6	245	256	90
5	13	Boston Bruins	82	35	41	6	219	289	76

Note: No. = Division rank, CR = Conference rank, W = Wins, L = Losses, T = Ties, GF = Goals For, GA = Goals Against, Pts = Points
Teams that qualified for the playoffs are highlighted in bold.

Eastern Conference
R		Div	GP	W	L	OTL	GF	GA	Pts
**1**	**P -** Buffalo Sabres	**NE**	**82**	**53**	**22**	**7**	**308**	**242**	113
**2**	**Y -** New Jersey Devils	**AT**	**82**	**49**	**24**	**9**	**216**	**201**	107
**3**	**Y -** Atlanta Thrashers	**SE**	**82**	**43**	**28**	**11**	**246**	**245**	97
**4**	**X -** Ottawa Senators	**NE**	**82**	**48**	**25**	**9**	**288**	**222**	105
**5**	**X -** Pittsburgh Penguins	**AT**	**82**	**47**	**24**	**11**	**277**	**246**	105
**6**	**X -** New York Rangers	**AT**	**82**	**42**	**30**	**10**	**242**	**216**	94
**7**	**X -** Tampa Bay Lightning	**SE**	**82**	**44**	**33**	**5**	**253**	**261**	93
**8**	**X -** New York Islanders	**AT**	**82**	**40**	**30**	**12**	**248**	**240**	92
8.5
9	Toronto Maple Leafs	NE	82	40	31	11	258	269	91
10	Montreal Canadiens	NE	82	42	34	6	245	256	90
11	Carolina Hurricanes	SE	82	40	34	8	241	253	88
12	Florida Panthers	SE	82	35	31	16	247	257	86
13	Boston Bruins	NE	82	35	41	6	219	289	76
14	Washington Capitals	SE	82	28	40	14	235	286	70
15	Philadelphia Flyers	AT	82	22	48	12	214	303	56

Divisions: AT – Atlantic, NE – Northeast, SE – Southeast

P – Clinched Presidents Trophy; Y – Clinched division; X – Clinched playoff spot

== Schedule and results ==
2006–07 regular season
October: 3–5–1 (home: 2–2–0; road: 1–3–1)

Game	Date	Score	Opponent	Record	Recap
1	October 6, 2006	3–8	@ Florida Panthers (2006–07)	0–1–0	L
2	October 7, 2006	3–2	@ Tampa Bay Lightning (2006–07)	1–1–0	W
3	October 11, 2006	1–4	@ Atlanta Thrashers (2006–07)	1–2–0	L
4	October 12, 2006	2–3 SO	@ St. Louis Blues (2006–07)	1–2–1	OTL
5	October 14, 2006	1–4	@ New York Islanders (2006–07)	1–3–1	L
6	October 19, 2006	3–2	Calgary Flames (2006–07)	2–3–1	W
7	October 21, 2006	2–6	Buffalo Sabres (2006–07)	2–4–1	L
8	October 26, 2006	2–3	Montreal Canadiens (2006–07)	2–5–1	L
9	October 28, 2006	2–1	Ottawa Senators (2006–07)	3–5–1	W

November: 9–4–1 (home: 5–3–1; road: 4–1–0)

Game	Date	Score	Opponent	Record	Recap
10	November 2, 2006	4–5 SO	Buffalo Sabres (2006–07)	3–5–2	OTL
11	November 4, 2006	6–5 OT	Tampa Bay Lightning (2006–07)	4–5–2	W
12	November 6, 2006	3–5	@ Atlanta Thrashers (2006–07)	4–6–2	L
13	November 9, 2006	4–6	Toronto Maple Leafs (2006–07)	4–7–2	L
14	November 11, 2006	4–3	Ottawa Senators (2006–07)	5–7–2	W
15	November 15, 2006	3–2 SO	@ Washington Capitals (2006–07)	6–7–2	W
16	November 16, 2006	2–1 OT	Toronto Maple Leafs (2006–07)	7–7–2	W
17	November 18, 2006	3–2 OT	Washington Capitals (2006–07)	8–7–2	W
18	November 20, 2006	2–3	Florida Panthers (2006–07)	8–8–2	L
19	November 22, 2006	4–3 SO	@ Pittsburgh Penguins (2006–07)	9–8–2	W
20	November 24, 2006	1–5	Carolina Hurricanes (2006–07)	9–9–2	L
21	November 25, 2006	3–1	@ Toronto Maple Leafs (2006–07)	10–9–2	W
22	November 28, 2006	4–1	@ Toronto Maple Leafs (2006–07)	11–9–2	W
23	November 30, 2006	4–3 SO	Tampa Bay Lightning (2006–07)	12–9–2	W

December: 7–5–1 (home: 4–2–0; road: 3–3–1)

Game	Date	Score	Opponent	Record	Recap
24	December 2, 2006	2–5	@ Carolina Hurricanes (2006–07)	12–10–2	L
25	December 4, 2006	6–5	@ Montreal Canadiens (2006–07)	13–10–2	W
26	December 7, 2006	3–1	Toronto Maple Leafs (2006–07)	14–10–2	W
27	December 9, 2006	1–5	New Jersey Devils (2006–07)	14–11–2	L
28	December 12, 2006	3–4	@ Montreal Canadiens (2006–07)	14–12–2	L
29	December 14, 2006	5–3	New Jersey Devils (2006–07)	15–12–2	W
30	December 16, 2006	3–6	Florida Panthers (2006–07)	15–13–2	L
31	December 19, 2006	7–2	@ Ottawa Senators (2006–07)	16–13–2	W
32	December 21, 2006	2–0	Vancouver Canucks (2006–07)	17–13–2	W
33	December 23, 2006	4–2	Montreal Canadiens (2006–07)	18–13–2	W
34	December 26, 2006	4–5 OT	@ Columbus Blue Jackets (2006–07)	18–13–3	OTL
35	December 29, 2006	5–3	@ Chicago Blackhawks (2006–07)	19–13–3	W
36	December 30, 2006	0–5	@ Nashville Predators (2006–07)	19–14–3	L

January: 3–9–1 (home: 3–3–1; road: 0–6–0)

Game	Date	Score	Opponent	Record	Recap
37	January 1, 2007	1–5	@ Toronto Maple Leafs (2006–07)	19–15–3	L
38	January 4, 2007	2–10	Toronto Maple Leafs (2006–07)	19–16–3	L
39	January 6, 2007	4–3	Philadelphia Flyers (2006–07)	20–16–3	W
40	January 9, 2007	2–5	@ Ottawa Senators (2006–07)	20–17–3	L
41	January 11, 2007	4–5 SO	New York Islanders (2006–07)	20–17–4	OTL
42	January 13, 2007	1–3	@ New York Rangers (2006–07)	20–18–4	L
43	January 15, 2007	3–2 SO	Buffalo Sabres (2006–07)	21–18–4	W
44	January 17, 2007	3–6	@ Buffalo Sabres (2006–07)	21–19–4	L
45	January 18, 2007	5–4 SO	Pittsburgh Penguins (2006–07)	22–19–4	W
46	January 20, 2007	0–3	Ottawa Senators (2006–07)	22–20–4	L
47	January 27, 2007	1–3	@ Ottawa Senators (2006–07)	22–21–4	L
48	January 29, 2007	1–6	New York Rangers (2006–07)	22–22–4	L
49	January 30, 2007	1–7	@ Buffalo Sabres (2006–07)	22–23–4	L

February: 8–5–0 (home: 2–3–0; road: 6–2–0)

Game	Date	Score	Opponent	Record	Recap
50	February 1, 2007	1–3	Buffalo Sabres (2006–07)	22–24–4	L
51	February 3, 2007	4–3 OT	@ Carolina Hurricanes (2006–07)	23–24–4	W
52	February 6, 2007	3–2 SO	@ Washington Capitals (2006–07)	24–24–4	W
53	February 8, 2007	2–5	Carolina Hurricanes (2006–07)	24–25–4	L
54	February 10, 2007	4–3 SO	New York Islanders (2006–07)	25–25–4	W
55	February 13, 2007	3–0	Edmonton Oilers (2006–07)	26–25–4	W
56	February 15, 2007	1–4	@ New York Islanders (2006–07)	26–26–4	L
57	February 17, 2007	4–3 SO	@ Buffalo Sabres (2006–07)	27–26–4	W
58	February 19, 2007	6–3	@ Philadelphia Flyers (2006–07)	28–26–4	W
59	February 20, 2007	3–0	@ Toronto Maple Leafs (2006–07)	29–26–4	W
60	February 23, 2007	6–2	@ Tampa Bay Lightning (2006–07)	30–26–4	W
61	February 24, 2007	2–7	@ Florida Panthers (2006–07)	30–27–4	L
62	February 26, 2007	2–3	Atlanta Thrashers (2006–07)	30–28–4	L

March: 5–9–2 (home: 2–5–2; road: 3–4–0)

Game	Date	Score	Opponent	Record	Recap
63	March 1, 2007	3–4 OT	Philadelphia Flyers (2006–07)	30–28–5	OTL
64	March 3, 2007	3–1	Montreal Canadiens (2006–07)	31–28–5	W
65	March 4, 2007	4–1	@ New Jersey Devils (2006–07)	32–28–5	W
66	March 6, 2007	0–2	Colorado Avalanche (2006–07)	32–29–5	L
67	March 8, 2007	1–2	Minnesota Wild (2006–07)	32–30–5	L
68	March 10, 2007	1–4	@ Philadelphia Flyers (2006–07)	32–31–5	L
69	March 11, 2007	6–3	@ Detroit Red Wings (2006–07)	33–31–5	W
70	March 15, 2007	4–3 SO	Washington Capitals (2006–07)	34–31–5	W
71	March 17, 2007	0–7	@ New York Rangers (2006–07)	34–32–5	L
72	March 20, 2007	0–1	@ Montreal Canadiens (2006–07)	34–33–5	L
73	March 22, 2007	3–6	Montreal Canadiens (2006–07)	34–34–5	L
74	March 24, 2007	1–2 SO	New York Rangers (2006–07)	34–34–6	OTL
75	March 25, 2007	0–5	@ Pittsburgh Penguins (2006–07)	34–35–6	L
76	March 27, 2007	3–2	@ Ottawa Senators (2006–07)	35–35–6	W
77	March 29, 2007	2–4	Pittsburgh Penguins (2006–07)	35–36–6	L
78	March 31, 2007	2–3	Atlanta Thrashers (2006–07)	35–37–6	L

April: 0–4–0 (home: 0–1–0; road: 0–3–0)

Game	Date	Score	Opponent	Record	Recap
79	April 1, 2007	1–3	@ New Jersey Devils (2006–07)	35–38–6	L
80	April 3, 2007	0–2	@ Montreal Canadiens (2006–07)	35–39–6	L
81	April 5, 2007	2–4	@ Buffalo Sabres (2006–07)	35–40–6	L
82	April 7, 2007	3–6	Ottawa Senators (2006–07)	35–41–6	L

Legend: W Win (2 points) L Loss (0 points) OTL Overtime/shootout loss (1 point)

== Player statistics ==
=== Scoring ===
- Position abbreviations: C = Center; D = Defense; G = Goaltender; LW = Left wing; RW = Right wing
- † = Joined team via a transaction (e.g., trade, waivers, signing) during the season. Stats reflect time with the Bruins only.
- ‡ = Left team via a transaction (e.g., trade, waivers, release) during the season. Stats reflect time with the Bruins only.

No.	Player	Pos	Regular season					
No.	Player	Pos	GP	G	A	Pts	+/-	PIM
91 (Note: Savard wore number 71 in his first nine games.)	Marc Savard	C	82	22	74	96	−19	96
37	Patrice Bergeron	C	77	22	48	70	−28	26
27	Glen Murray	RW	59	28	17	45	−12	44
16	Marco Sturm	LW	76	27	17	44	−24	46
33	Zdeno Chara	D	80	11	32	43	−21	100
26	Brad Boyes‡	C	62	13	21	34	−17	25
81	Phil Kessel	C	70	11	18	29	−12	12
11	P. J. Axelsson	LW	55	11	16	27	−10	52
10	Brandon Bochenski†	RW	31	11	11	22	3	14
23	Paul Mara‡	D	59	3	15	18	−22	95
6	Brad Stuart‡	D	48	7	10	17	−22	26
22	Shean Donovan	RW	76	6	11	17	−13	56
18	Mark Mowers	C	78	5	12	17	−10	26
20	Wayne Primeau‡	C	51	7	8	15	−15	75
17	Petr Tenkrat	RW	64	9	5	14	−16	34
13	Stanislav Chistov†	LW	60	5	8	13	−8	36
41	Andrew Alberts	D	76	0	10	10	−15	124
25	Jason York	D	49	1	7	8	−14	32
47	Petr Kalus	LW	9	4	1	5	0	6
68	Milan Jurcina‡	D	40	2	1	3	−5	20
21	Andrew Ference†	D	26	1	2	3	−2	31
44	Aaron Ward†	D	20	1	2	3	−8	18
6	Dennis Wideman†	D	20	1	2	3	−3	27
38	Bobby Allen	D	31	0	3	3	−1	10
12	Chuck Kobasew†	C	10	1	1	2	−6	25
32	Jeff Hoggan	LW	46	0	2	2	−8	33
49	Matt Lashoff	D	12	0	2	2	−6	12
43	Yan Stastny‡	C	21	0	2	2	−3	19
28	Wade Brookbank‡	LW	7	1	0	1	−1	15
21 (Note: Dempsey wore number 29 in his first eight games.)	Nathan Dempsey	D	17	0	1	1	−2	6
53	Jeremy Reich	LW	32	0	1	1	−10	63
45	Mark Stuart	D	15	0	1	1	7	14
60	Brian Finley	G	2	0	0	0		0
46	David Krejci	C	6	0	0	0	−3	2
31	Joey MacDonald†	G	7	0	0	0		0
35	Philippe Sauve†	G	2	0	0	0		0
50	Jonathan Sigalet	D	1	0	0	0	−2	4
30	Tim Thomas	G	66	0	0	0		6
52	Nate Thompson	C	4	0	0	0	0	0
54	Hannu Toivonen	G	18	0	0	0		2
56	Ben Walter	C	4	0	0	0	0	0

=== Goaltending ===
- † = Joined team via a transaction (e.g., trade, waivers, signing) during the season. Stats reflect time with the Bruins only.

No.	Player	Regular season									
No.	Player	GP	W	L	OT	SA	GA	GAA	SV%	SO	TOI
30	Tim Thomas	66	30	29	4	1985	189	3.13	.905	3	3619
54	Hannu Toivonen	18	3	9	1	502	63	4.23	.875	0	894
31	Joey MacDonald†	7	2	2	1	195	16	2.68	.918	0	358
60	Brian Finley	2	0	1	0	33	3	3.04	.909	0	59
35	Philippe Sauve†	2	0	0	0	23	4	5.80	.826	0	41

== Awards and records ==
=== Awards ===
Type	Award/honor	Recipient	Ref
League (annual)	Bill Masterton Memorial Trophy	Phil Kessel	
League (in-season)	NHL All-Star Game selection	Zdeno Chara	
League (in-season)	NHL First Star of the Week	Marc Savard (November 5)	
League (in-season)	NHL First Star of the Week	Tim Thomas (December 24)	
League (in-season)	NHL Second Star of the Week	Marc Savard (February 25)	
League (in-season)	NHL Third Star of the Week	Tim Thomas (November 19)	
League (in-season)	NHL YoungStars Game selection	Phil Kessel	
Team	Eddie Shore Award	Tim Thomas	
Team	Elizabeth C. Dufresne Trophy	Marc Savard	
Team	John P. Bucyk Award	Patrice Bergeron	
Team	Seventh Player Award	Tim Thomas	
Team	Three Stars Awards	Marc Savard (1st)	
Team	Three Stars Awards	Tim Thomas (2nd)	
Team	Three Stars Awards	Glen Murray (3rd)	

=== Milestones ===
Milestone	Player	Date	Ref
First game	Phil Kessel	October 6, 2006	
First game	Nate Thompson	October 21, 2006	
First game	Matt Lashoff	October 26, 2006	
First game	Jonathan Sigalet	January 9, 2007	
First game	David Krejci	January 30, 2007	
First game	Petr Kalus	March 24, 2007	

== Transactions ==
The Bruins were involved in the following transactions from June 20, 2006, the day after the deciding game of the 2006 Stanley Cup Finals, through June 6, 2007, the day of the deciding game of the 2007 Stanley Cup Finals.

=== Trades ===
Date	Details		Ref
June 24, 2006	To Toronto Maple Leafs: Andrew Raycroft	To Boston Bruins: Rights to Tuukka Rask	
June 24, 2006	To New York Islanders: 4th-round pick in 2006; Chicago's 5th-round pick in 2006	To Boston Bruins: Phoenix's 3rd-round pick in 2006	
June 26, 2006	To Phoenix Coyotes: Nick Boynton; 4th-round pick in 2007	To Boston Bruins: Paul Mara; 3rd-round pick in 2007 or 2008	
November 13, 2006	To Anaheim Ducks: Phoenix's 3rd-round pick in 2007 or 2008	To Boston Bruins: Stanislav Chistov	
November 14, 2006	To Phoenix Coyotes: Tyler Redenbach	To Boston Bruins: Philippe Sauve	
December 19, 2006	To Pittsburgh Penguins: Wade Brookbank	To Boston Bruins: Future considerations	
January 16, 2007	To St. Louis Blues: Yan Stastny	To Boston Bruins: 5th-round pick in 2007	
February 1, 2007	To Washington Capitals: Milan Jurcina	To Boston Bruins: 4th-round pick in 2008	
February 3, 2007	To Chicago Blackhawks: Kris Versteeg; Conditional draft pick	To Boston Bruins: Brandon Bochenski	
February 10, 2007	To Calgary Flames: Wayne Primeau; Brad Stuart; Conditional 4th-round pick in 2008 (Note: Condition met. Calgary received the pick since Stuart did not re-sign with them and instead signed with the Los Angeles Kings as a free agent on July 3, 2007.)	To Boston Bruins: Andrew Ference; Chuck Kobasew	
February 27, 2007	To New York Rangers: Paul Mara	To Boston Bruins: Aaron Ward	
February 27, 2007	To St. Louis Blues: Brad Boyes	To Boston Bruins: Dennis Wideman	
May 16, 2007	To Columbus Blue Jackets: 5th-round pick in 2007	To Boston Bruins: Rights to Adam McQuaid	

=== Players acquired ===
Date	Player	Former team	Term	Via	Ref
July 1, 2006	Zdeno Chara	Ottawa Senators	5-year	Free agency	
July 1, 2006	Marc Savard	Atlanta Thrashers	4-year	Free agency	
July 2, 2006	Shean Donovan	Calgary Flames	2-year	Free agency	
July 6, 2006	Mark Mowers	Detroit Red Wings	2-year	Free agency	
July 11, 2006	Chris Collins	Boston College (HE)	2-year	Free agency	
July 17, 2006	Bobby Allen	New Jersey Devils		Free agency	
July 17, 2006	Nate DiCasmirro	Edmonton Oilers		Free agency	
July 17, 2006	Brian Finley	Nashville Predators		Free agency	
July 17, 2006	Dennis Packard	Tampa Bay Lightning		Free agency	
July 21, 2006	Wade Brookbank	Vancouver Canucks		Free agency	
July 21, 2006	Jeff Hoggan	St. Louis Blues	1-year	Free agency	
July 21, 2006	Jason York	St. Louis Blues	1-year	Free agency	
August 7, 2006	Nathan Dempsey	Los Angeles Kings	1-year	Free agency	
August 7, 2006	Pascal Pelletier	Providence Bruins (AHL)		Free agency	
August 28, 2006	T. J. Trevelyan	St. Lawrence University (ECAC)	multi-year	Free agency	
February 24, 2007	Joey MacDonald	Detroit Red Wings		Waivers	

=== Players lost ===
Date	Player	New team	Via (Note: In parentheses is the player's free agency group on July 1 if applicable.)	Ref
June 30, 2006	Travis Green	Anaheim Ducks (Note: Green signed with Anaheim on August 10.)	Buyout	
June 30, 2006	Shawn McEachern (Note: McEachern announced his retirement on August 27.)		Buyout	
July 1, 2006	Brian Eklund (Note: Eklund retired.)		Contract expiration (VI)	
July 1, 2006	Hal Gill	Toronto Maple Leafs	Free agency (III)	
July 1, 2006	Jason MacDonald (Note: MacDonald retired.)		Contract expiration (III)	
July 1, 2006	Garret Stroshein (Note: Stroshein retired.)		Contract expiration (UFA)	
July 4, 2006	Marty Reasoner	Edmonton Oilers	Free agency (III)	
July 12, 2006	Ben Guite	Colorado Avalanche	Free agency (VI)	
July 15, 2006	Eric Healey	Tampa Bay Lightning	Free agency (III)	
July 17, 2006	Pat Leahy	Nashville Predators	Free agency (UFA)	
July 21, 2006	Mariusz Czerkawski	Rapperswil-Jona Lakers (NLA)	Free agency (III)	
July 29, 2006	Josh Langfeld	Detroit Red Wings	Free agency (UFA)	
July 31, 2006	Jiri Slegr	HC Litvinov (ELH)	Free agency (III)	
August 5, 2006	David Tanabe	Carolina Hurricanes (Note: Tanabe signed with Carolina on August 29.)	Release (II) (Note: Tanabe received a $1.275 million arbitration award on August 3. Boston elected to “walk away” from the award, making Tanabe an unrestricted free agent.)	
August 15, 2006	Ian Moran	Anaheim Ducks	Free agency (III)	
August 30, 2006	Brad Isbister	Carolina Hurricanes	Free agency (III)	
September 12, 2006	Tom Fitzgerald		Retirement (III)	
September 13, 2006	Alexei Zhamnov		Retirement	
October 4, 2006	Dan LaCouture	New Jersey Devils	Free agency (III)	
May 24, 2007	Brian Leetch		Retirement (III)	

=== Signings ===
Date	Player	Term	Contract type	Ref
July 17, 2006	Andrew Alberts	1-year	Re-signing	
July 17, 2006	Jeremy Reich		Re-signing	
August 3, 2006	Brad Boyes	2-year	Re-signing	
August 7, 2006	Milan Jurcina		Re-signing	
August 17, 2006	Phil Kessel	multi-year	Entry-level	
August 22, 2006	Patrice Bergeron	5-year	Re-signing	
August 31, 2006	Jordan Sigalet		Re-signing	
September 9, 2006	Wacey Rabbit	multi-year	Entry-level	
February 24, 2007	Marco Sturm	multi-year	Extension	
April 26, 2007	Hannu Toivonen	1-year	Extension	
May 5, 2007	Tuukka Rask	multi-year	Entry-level	
May 16, 2007	Adam McQuaid	multi-year	Entry-level	
May 31, 2007	Mikko Lehtonen	3-year	Entry-level	
May 31, 2007	Vladimir Sobotka	3-year	Entry-level	

== Draft picks ==
Boston's picks at the 2006 NHL entry draft in Vancouver, British Columbia. The Bruins had the 5th overall draft pick.

Round	#	Player	Nationality	NHL team	College/junior/club team (league)
1	5	Phil Kessel (C/RW)	United States	Boston Bruins	University of Minnesota (WCHA)
2	37	Yuri Alexandrov (D)	Russia	Boston Bruins	Severstal Cherepovets (Russia)
2	50	Milan Lucic (LW)	Canada	Boston Bruins (from Edmonton)	Vancouver Giants (WHL)
3	71	Brad Marchand (C)	Canada	Boston Bruins	Moncton Wildcats (QMJHL)
5	128	Andrew Bodnarchuk (D)	Canada	Boston Bruins	Halifax Mooseheads (QMJHL)
6	158	Levi Nelson (C)	Canada	Boston Bruins	Swift Current Broncos (WHL)

== See also ==
- 2006–07 NHL season
