= 2006–07 Ottawa Senators season =

NHL hockey team season

2006–07 Ottawa Senators
- Eastern Conference champions
- Division: 2nd Northeast
- Conference: 4th Eastern
- 2006–07 record: 48–25–9
- Home record: 25–13–3
- Road record: 23–12–6
- Goals for: 288
- Goals against: 222

Team information
- General manager: John Muckler
- Coach: Bryan Murray
- Captain: Daniel Alfredsson
- Alternate captains: Chris Phillips; Wade Redden
- Arena: Scotiabank Place
- Average attendance: 19,372
- Minor league affiliates: Binghamton Senators; Charlotte Checkers

Team leaders
- Goals: Dany Heatley (50)
- Assists: Daniel Alfredsson (58)
- Points: Dany Heatley (105)
- Penalty minutes: Chris Neil (177)
- Plus/minus: Daniel Alfredsson (+42)
- Wins: Ray Emery (33)
- Goals against average: Ray Emery (2.47)

The 2006–07 Ottawa Senators season was the 15th season of the Ottawa Senators of the National Hockey League (NHL). This season saw the team rebound from a disappointing early exit from the 2006 playoffs. The team made its first appearance in the Stanley Cup Final, losing to the Anaheim Ducks. After numerous personnel changes at the start of the season, the team had a poor record until December. The poor record sparked numerous trade rumours in the media. The team turned their play around to place second in the division and won three playoff series to make it to the Stanley Cup Finals, the first in Ottawa in 80 years.

The line of Daniel Alfredsson, Jason Spezza and Dany Heatley would lead the way with impressive offensive totals. In the playoffs, the line led the team to three series wins. In the Final, the line was shut down by the superior defence and goaltending of Anaheim and the team lost the series four games to one. Alfredsson would lead all scorers in the playoffs.

== Off-season ==
In July 2006, the Senators lost four players to free agency; defencemen Zdeno Chara (who signed with the Boston Bruins), Brian Pothier (who signed with the Washington Capitals), goalie Dominik Hasek (who signed a one-year deal with the Detroit Red Wings) and forward Vaclav Varada (who signed with HC Davos of the Swiss Elite League).

Former Carolina Hurricanes starter Martin Gerber was signed to fill the void left by Hasek, and Ottawa also signed defenceman Joe Corvo, formerly of the Los Angeles Kings. A short time later, they traded star forward Martin Havlat and centre Bryan Smolinski to the Chicago Blackhawks for Tom Preissing, Josh Hennessy, Michal Barinka and a second-round draft pick in 2008.

The club signed Russian centre Alexei Kaigorodov to a two-year, entry-level contract. They also signed blueliner Jamie Allison and re-signed Antoine Vermette, Chris Neil and Peter Schaefer to avoid arbitration proceedings. In addition, Ottawa re-signed Chris Kelly and Jason Spezza to two-year contracts each, as well as Christoph Schubert.

Having to decide between one of their two star defensemen. Wade Redden was ultimately the choice over Zdeno Chara based on his impressive past couple of seasons. In the 2005–06 season, Redden was selected for the Canadian Olympic team, along with teammate Dany Heatley, and finished the season with a career-high 50 points and an NHL-leading +35 plus-minus rating in 65 games. The Senators chose Redden and the Senators and Redden agreed on a two-year contract worth $13 million with a no-trade clause; Chara signed with the Boston Bruins. Redden's salary made him the highest paid player on the team and the media and fans expected another top-notch season.

== Regular season ==
The goaltending duty was platooned between Ray Emery and Martin Gerber at first. Gerber struggled and Emery eventually won the starting job.

=== Highlights ===
After starting with a 17–18–1 record by December 21, Ottawa played better from that point on (31–7–8).

On January 3, 2007, Ottawa acquired centre Mike Comrie from the Phoenix Coyotes in exchange for prospect Alexei Kaigorodov. Ottawa was in need of another centre due to injuries and was eager to shed Kaigorodov, who was suspended for refusing an assignment to the Senators' American Hockey League affiliate, the Binghamton Senators, instead opting to play in Russia.

Dany Heatley was the representative for Ottawa at the 2007 All-Star Game for the East, managing a 94.0 MPH slapshot in the skills competition and a goal and two assists in the East's 12–9 loss to the West. For the YoungStars Game, sophomore defenceman Andrej Meszaros and forward Patrick Eaves participated.

On February 22, 2007, the Senators were involved in a huge brawl with the Buffalo Sabres over an alleged late hit by the Senators' Chris Neil on Sabres' co-captain Chris Drury. Although the referees ruled it was a legal hit (and replays and analysts concurred after the game), a fight ensued after play restarted. Eight players were assessed a total of 100 penalty minutes, and five players, including Senators Ray Emery and Chris Phillips, were ejected. The Senators lost the match, 6–5, in a shootout, one of a record eight overtime games and four shootouts that night.

Midway through the season, the Senators acquired left wing Oleg Saprykin from the Phoenix Coyotes. They would also acquire defenceman Lawrence Nycholat from the Washington Capitals.

The team finished second in the Northeast Division, behind the Presidents' Trophy-winning Buffalo Sabres, and third in the Conference in points (the team was seeded fourth due to the precedence of divisional winners). Because the Montreal Canadiens and the Toronto Maple Leafs both narrowly missed the playoffs, the Senators were the only Canadian-based team in the Eastern Conference to qualify for the playoffs. They also tied the Canadiens for most shorthanded goals scored during the regular season, with 17.

=== Season standings ===
Northeast Division
No.	CR		GP	W	L	OTL	GF	GA	Pts
1	1	**Buffalo Sabres**	82	53	22	7	308	242	113
2	4	**Ottawa Senators**	82	48	25	9	288	222	105
3	9	Toronto Maple Leafs	82	40	31	11	258	269	91
4	10	Montreal Canadiens	82	42	34	6	245	256	90
5	13	Boston Bruins	82	35	41	6	219	289	76

Note: No. = Division rank, CR = Conference rank, W = Wins, L = Losses, T = Ties, GF = Goals For, GA = Goals Against, Pts = Points
Teams that qualified for the playoffs are highlighted in bold.

Eastern Conference
R		Div	GP	W	L	OTL	GF	GA	Pts
**1**	**P -** Buffalo Sabres	**NE**	**82**	**53**	**22**	**7**	**308**	**242**	113
**2**	**Y -** New Jersey Devils	**AT**	**82**	**49**	**24**	**9**	**216**	**201**	107
**3**	**Y -** Atlanta Thrashers	**SE**	**82**	**43**	**28**	**11**	**246**	**245**	97
**4**	**X -** Ottawa Senators	**NE**	**82**	**48**	**25**	**9**	**288**	**222**	105
**5**	**X -** Pittsburgh Penguins	**AT**	**82**	**47**	**24**	**11**	**277**	**246**	105
**6**	**X -** New York Rangers	**AT**	**82**	**42**	**30**	**10**	**242**	**216**	94
**7**	**X -** Tampa Bay Lightning	**SE**	**82**	**44**	**33**	**5**	**253**	**261**	93
**8**	**X -** New York Islanders	**AT**	**82**	**40**	**30**	**12**	**248**	**240**	92
8.5
9	Toronto Maple Leafs	NE	82	40	31	11	258	269	91
10	Montreal Canadiens	NE	82	42	34	6	245	256	90
11	Carolina Hurricanes	SE	82	40	34	8	241	253	88
12	Florida Panthers	SE	82	35	31	16	247	257	86
13	Boston Bruins	NE	82	35	41	6	219	289	76
14	Washington Capitals	SE	82	28	40	14	235	286	70
15	Philadelphia Flyers	AT	82	22	48	12	214	303	56

Divisions: AT – Atlantic, NE – Northeast, SE – Southeast

P – Clinched Presidents Trophy; Y – Clinched division; X – Clinched playoff spot

== Playoffs ==
The Ottawa Senators ended the 2006–07 regular season as the Eastern Conference's fourth seed.

The Senators started the playoffs against the fifth-seeded Pittsburgh Penguins, whom they defeated four games to one. The second-seeded New Jersey Devils were their next opponent, with the same four-games-to-one result, again in favor of the Senators. In the Eastern Conference Final, the Senators faced the top-seeded Buffalo Sabres. Once again, Ottawa won in five games, which gave the Senators their first-ever trip to the Stanley Cup Final. This was also the Sens' first series win against the Sabres.

Finals

The Anaheim Ducks were the Senators' opponents in the Finals and the four-games-to-one result stayed the same for the Senators, the only difference being this time it was in the opposing team's favor. The Ducks were successful in shutting down the Senators's top line to the point where it was broken up in game five. All games were close except for game five which the Senators lost 6–2, when two goals went in off Senators defencemen and Chris Phillips caused an own-goal, which turned out to be the game-winning and Cup-winning goal attributed to Travis Moen, and possibly the only such goal in Finals history. Daniel Alfredsson was the Senators' top forward in the series as he had been all playoffs, scoring four goals. Dany Heatley and Jason Spezza were held to one goal and two assists in total.

=== Key contributors ===
After a poor start to the season, several players picked up their play and the Senators played well from December to the Stanley Cup Final. The defence pairing of Chris Phillips and Anton Volchenkov won praise from the media for their "shutdown effectiveness" against opposing top lines. The 'CASH line' of Spezza, Heatley, and Alfredsson was outstanding offensively, scoring nearly half of the Senators' goals in the post-season, appearing on The Hockey News cover for their play. The line tied for the NHL and team scoring lead with 22 points in 20 playoff games. Goaltender Ray Emery played all 20 games and posted 13 wins.

== Schedule and results ==
=== Regular season ===
2006–07 regular season
October: 5–6–0 (home: 2–4–0; road: 3–2–0)

Game	Date	Visitor	Score	Home	OT	Decision	Attendance	Record	Points	Recap
1	October 4	Ottawa	4 – 1	Toronto		Gerber	19,520	1–0–0	2	W
2	October 5	Toronto	6 – 0	Ottawa		Gerber	19,237	1–1–0	2	L
3	October 7	Buffalo	4 – 3	Ottawa		Gerber	19,202	1–2–0	2	L
4	October 12	Calgary	1 – 0	Ottawa		Emery	18,404	1–3–0	2	L
5	October 14	Ottawa	3 – 2	Montreal	SO	Emery	21,273	2–3–0	4	W
6	October 19	Colorado	2 – 1	Ottawa		Gerber	17,728	2–4–0	4	L
7	October 21	New Jersey	1 – 8	Ottawa		Emery	19,166	3–4–0	6	W
8	October 24	Ottawa	6 – 2	Toronto		Gerber	19,485	4–4–0	8	W
9	October 26	Toronto	2 – 7	Ottawa		Emery	19,178	5–4–0	10	W
10	October 28	Ottawa	1 – 2	Boston		Gerber	13,281	5–5–0	10	L
11	October 31	Ottawa	2 – 4	Montreal		Emery	21,273	5–6–0	10	L

November: 8–6–1 (home: 3–2–0; road: 5–4–1)

Game	Date	Visitor	Score	Home	OT	Decision	Attendance	Record	Points	Recap
12	November 4	Carolina	4 – 2	Ottawa		Gerber	19,548	5–7–0	10	L
13	November 6	Ottawa	3 – 4	Washington	OT	Gerber	10,485	5–7–1	11	OTL
14	November 8	Ottawa	4 – 5	Atlanta		Gerber	16,253	5–8–1	11	L
15	November 10	Ottawa	6 – 3	Pittsburgh		Gerber	17,052	6–8–1	13	W
16	November 11	Ottawa	3 – 4	Boston		Gerber	15,772	6–9–1	13	L
17	November 13	Montreal	6 – 3	Ottawa		Gerber	20,051	6–10–1	13	L
18	November 15	Ottawa	4 – 2	Buffalo		Emery	18,690	7–10–1	15	W
19	November 17	Ottawa	2 – 3	New Jersey		Emery	15,133	7–11–1	15	L
20	November 18	Buffalo	1 – 4	Ottawa		Emery	19,770	8–11–1	17	W
21	November 20	Minnesota	3 – 5	Ottawa		Emery	18,094	9–11–1	19	W
22	November 22	Ottawa	3 – 2	Philadelphia	OT	Emery	18,990	10–11–1	21	W
23	November 24	Ottawa	6 – 4	Florida		Emery	16,544	11–11–1	23	W
24	November 26	Ottawa	1 – 3	Tampa Bay		Emery	19,819	11–12–1	23	L
25	November 28	Ottawa	4 – 1	Carolina		Gerber	14,393	12–12–1	25	W
26	November 30	Florida	0 – 6	Ottawa		Emery	17,814	13–12–1	27	W

December: 8–6–0 (home: 3–3–0; road: 5–3–0)

Game	Date	Visitor	Score	Home	OT	Decision	Attendance	Record	Points	Recap
27	December 2	Tampa Bay	2 – 5	Ottawa		Emery	18,618	14–12–1	29	W
28	December 5	Ottawa	4 – 2	NY Islanders		Gerber	8,741	15–12–1	31	W
29	December 6	Ottawa	2 – 6	Washington		Emery	10,926	15–13–1	31	L
30	December 9	NY Rangers	3 – 1	Ottawa		Emery	19,192	15–14–1	31	L
31	December 10	Ottawa	2 – 6	Columbus		Gerber	15,797	15–15–1	31	L
32	December 12	Ottawa	3 – 2	Detroit		Emery	20,066	16–15–1	33	W
33	December 14	Ottawa	0 – 6	Nashville		Emery	12,718	16–16–1	33	L
34	December 16	Ottawa	3 – 1	Buffalo		Emery	18,690	17–16–1	35	W
35	December 19	Boston	7 – 2	Ottawa		Emery	19,153	17–17–1	35	L
36	December 21	Tampa Bay	4 – 2	Ottawa		Emery	18,603	17–18–1	35	L
37	December 23	Ottawa	6 – 3	Philadelphia		Gerber	19,268	18–18–1	37	W
38	December 27	NY Islanders	0 – 2	Ottawa		Emery	20,192	19–18–1	39	W
39	December 29	NY Rangers	0 – 1	Ottawa		Emery	20,214	20–18–1	41	W
40	December 30	Ottawa	3 – 2	Toronto	OT	Emery	19,483	21–18–1	43	W

January: 9–3–1 (home: 7–2–1; road: 2–1–0)

Game	Date	Visitor	Score	Home	OT	Decision	Attendance	Record	Points	Recap
41	January 1	Atlanta	3 – 2	Ottawa	OT	Emery	19,707	21–18–2	44	OTL
42	January 3	Buffalo	3 – 6	Ottawa		Emery	19,777	22–18–2	46	W
43	January 6	New Jersey	3 – 2	Ottawa		Emery	19,548	22–19–2	46	L
44	January 7	Philadelphia	1 – 6	Ottawa		Gerber	18,509	23–19–2	48	W
45	January 9	Boston	2 – 5	Ottawa		Emery	18,292	24–19–2	50	W
46	January 11	Ottawa	6 – 4	NY Rangers		Emery	18,200	25–19–2	52	W
47	January 13	Montreal	3 – 8	Ottawa		Emery	20,038	26–19–2	54	W
48	January 16	Washington	2 – 5	Ottawa		Emery	18,810	27–19–2	56	W
49	January 18	Vancouver	2 – 1	Ottawa		Emery	19,161	27–20–2	56	L
50	January 20	Ottawa	3 – 0	Boston		Emery	17,565	28–20–2	58	W
51	January 27	Boston	1 – 3	Ottawa		Emery	19,846	29–20–2	60	W
52	January 29	Ottawa	1 – 3	Montreal		Emery	21,273	29–21–2	60	L
53	January 30	Washington	2 – 3	Ottawa		Gerber	19,178	30–21–2	62	W

February: 8–1–2 (home: 6–0–1; road: 2–1–1)

Game	Date	Visitor	Score	Home	OT	Decision	Attendance	Record	Points	Recap
54	February 3	Toronto	3 – 2	Ottawa	SO	Emery	20,112	30–21–3	63	OTL
55	February 7	Ottawa	2 – 3	Buffalo		Emery	18,690	30–22–3	63	L
56	February 8	Montreal	1 – 4	Ottawa		Emery	19,915	31–22–3	65	W
57	February 10	Ottawa	5 – 3	Montreal		Emery	21,273	32–22–3	67	W
58	February 14	Florida	0 – 4	Ottawa		Gerber	18,561	33–22–3	69	W
59	February 17	Atlanta	3 – 5	Ottawa		Gerber	19,881	34–22–3	71	W
60	February 20	Edmonton	3 – 4	Ottawa	SO	Gerber	19,716	35–22–3	73	W
61	February 22	Ottawa	5 – 6	Buffalo	SO	Gerber	18,690	35–22–4	74	OTL
62	February 24	Buffalo	5 – 6	Ottawa		Emery	20,040	36–22–4	76	W
63	February 27	Ottawa	4 – 2	Carolina		Gerber	17,812	37–22–4	78	W
64	February 28	Carolina	0 – 2	Ottawa		Emery	19,261	38–22–4	80	W

March: 9–2–4 (home: 4–1–1; road: 5–1–3)

Game	Date	Visitor	Score	Home	OT	Decision	Attendance	Record	Points	Recap
65	March 2	Ottawa	2 – 4	Atlanta		Emery	16,190	38–23–4	80	L
66	March 4	Ottawa	3 – 4	Chicago	SO	Gerber	13,917	38–23–5	81	OTL
67	March 6	Pittsburgh	5 – 4	Ottawa	SO	Emery	20,074	38–23–6	82	OTL
68	March 8	Toronto	1 – 5	Ottawa		Emery	20,018	39–23–6	84	W
69	March 10	Ottawa	3 – 4	Toronto	OT	Emery	19,527	39–23–7	85	OTL
70	March 13	Ottawa	3 – 2	NY Rangers		Emery	18,200	40–23–7	87	W
71	March 15	NY Islanders	2 – 5	Ottawa		Emery	19,989	41–23–7	89	W
72	March 17	Philadelphia	2 – 3	Ottawa		Emery	19,639	42–23–7	91	W
73	March 18	Ottawa	3 – 4	Pittsburgh	SO	Emery	17,132	42–23–8	92	OTL
74	March 20	Ottawa	4 – 2	St. Louis		Gerber	13,188	43–23–8	94	W
75	March 22	Ottawa	4 – 2	Florida		Emery	14,202	44–23–8	96	W
76	March 24	Ottawa	7 – 2	Tampa Bay		Emery	20,342	45–23–8	98	W
77	March 27	Boston	3 – 2	Ottawa		Emery	19,786	45–24–8	98	L
78	March 30	Montreal	2 – 5	Ottawa		Emery	20,185	46–24–8	100	W
79	March 31	Ottawa	5 – 2	NY Islanders		Gerber	15,598	47–24–8	102	W

April: 1–1–1 (home: 0–1–0; road: 1–0–1)

Game	Date	Visitor	Score	Home	OT	Decision	Attendance	Record	Points	Recap
80	April 3	Ottawa	1 – 2	New Jersey	SO	Emery	11,642	47–24–9	103	OTL
81	April 5	Pittsburgh	3 – 2	Ottawa		Emery	20,064	47–25–9	103	L
82	April 7	Ottawa	6 – 3	Boston		Emery	17,565	48–25–9	105	W

Legend: W Win (2 points) L Loss (0 points) OTL Overtime/shootout loss (1 point)

=== Playoffs ===
2007 Stanley Cup playoffs
Eastern Conference Quarterfinals vs. (5) Pittsburgh Penguins – Senators win 4–1

Game	Date	Visitor	Score	Home	OT	Decision	Attendance	Series	Recap
1	April 11	Pittsburgh	3 – 6	Ottawa		Emery	19,611	1 – 0	W
2	April 14	Pittsburgh	4 – 3	Ottawa		Emery	20,133	1 – 1	L
3	April 15	Ottawa	4 – 2	Pittsburgh		Emery	17,132	2 – 1	W
4	April 17	Ottawa	2 – 1	Pittsburgh		Emery	17,132	3 – 1	W
5	April 19	Pittsburgh	0 – 3	Ottawa		Emery	20,179	4 – 1	W

Eastern Conference Semifinals vs. (2) New Jersey Devils – Senators win 4–1

Game	Date	Visitor	Score	Home	OT	Decision	Attendance	Series	Recap
1	April 26	Ottawa	5 – 4	New Jersey		Emery	15,512	1 – 0	W
2	April 28	Ottawa	2 – 3	New Jersey	2OT	Emery	19,040	1 – 1	L
3	April 30	New Jersey	0 – 2	Ottawa		Emery	19,636	2 – 1	W
4	May 2	New Jersey	2 – 3	Ottawa		Emery	20,248	3 – 1	W
5	May 5	Ottawa	3 – 2	New Jersey		Emery	19,040	4 – 1	W

Eastern Conference Finals vs. (1) Buffalo Sabres – Senators win 4–1

Game	Date	Visitor	Score	Home	OT	Decision	Attendance	Series	Recap
1	May 10	Ottawa	5 – 2	Buffalo		Emery	18,690	1 – 0	W
2	May 12	Ottawa	4 – 3	Buffalo	2OT	Emery	18,690	2 – 0	W
3	May 14	Buffalo	0 – 1	Ottawa		Emery	20,171	3 – 0	W
4	May 16	Buffalo	3 – 2	Ottawa		Emery	20,294	3 – 1	L
5	May 19	Ottawa	3 – 2	Buffalo	OT	Emery	18,690	4 – 1	W

Stanley Cup Finals vs. (W2) Anaheim Ducks – Ducks win 4–1

Game	Date	Visitor	Score	Home	OT	Decision	Attendance	Series	Recap
1	May 28	Ottawa	2 – 3	Anaheim		Emery	17,274	0 – 1	L
2	May 30	Ottawa	0 – 1	Anaheim		Emery	17,258	0 – 2	L
3	June 2	Anaheim	3 – 5	Ottawa		Emery	20,500	1 – 2	W
4	June 4	Anaheim	3 – 2	Ottawa		Emery	20,500	1 – 3	L
5	June 6	Ottawa	2 – 6	Anaheim		Emery	17,372	1 – 4	L

Legend: W Win L Loss

== Player statistics ==
=== Scoring ===
- Position abbreviations: C = Centre; D = Defence; G = Goaltender; LW = Left wing; RW = Right wing
- † = Joined team via a transaction (e.g., trade, waivers, signing) during the season. Stats reflect time with the Senators only.
- ‡ = Left team via a transaction (e.g., trade, waivers, release) during the season. Stats reflect time with the Senators only.

No.	Player	Pos	Regular season						Playoffs					
No.	Player	Pos	GP	G	A	Pts	+/-	PIM	GP	G	A	Pts	+/-	PIM
15	Dany Heatley	LW	82	50	55	105	31	74	20	7	15	22	4	14
19	Jason Spezza	C	67	34	53	87	19	45	20	7	15	22	5	10
11	Daniel Alfredsson	RW	77	29	58	87	42	42	20	14	8	22	4	10
12	Mike Fisher	C	68	22	26	48	15	41	20	5	5	10	−2	24
27	Peter Schaefer	LW	77	12	34	46	7	32	20	1	5	6	1	10
20	Antoine Vermette	C	77	19	20	39	−2	52	20	2	3	5	2	6
22	Chris Kelly	C	82	15	23	38	28	40	20	3	4	7	0	4
42	Tom Preissing	D	80	7	31	38	40	18	20	2	5	7	3	10
7	Joe Corvo	D	76	8	29	37	8	42	20	2	7	9	4	6
6	Wade Redden	D	64	7	29	36	1	50	20	3	7	10	6	10
14	Andrej Meszaros	D	82	7	28	35	−15	102	20	1	6	7	5	12
44	Patrick Eaves	RW	73	14	18	32	1	36	7	0	2	2	0	2
37	Dean McAmmond	C	81	14	15	29	11	28	18	5	3	8	5	11
25	Chris Neil	RW	82	12	16	28	6	177	20	2	2	4	0	20
4	Chris Phillips	D	82	8	18	26	36	80	20	0	0	0	−2	24
89	Mike Comrie†	C	41	13	12	25	−1	24	20	2	4	6	−1	17
5	Christoph Schubert	D	80	8	17	25	30	56	20	0	1	1	−5	22
24	Anton Volchenkov	D	78	1	18	19	37	67	20	2	4	6	−2	24
17	Denis Hamel‡	LW	43	4	3	7	4	10	—	—	—	—	—	—
61	Oleg Saprykin†	LW	12	1	1	2	−3	4	15	1	1	2	0	4
16	Brian McGrattan	RW	45	0	2	2	−1	100	—	—	—	—	—	—
36	Josh Hennessy	C	10	1	0	1	0	4	—	—	—	—	—	—
1	Ray Emery	G	58	0	1	1		30	20	0	2	2		0
55	Alexei Kaigorodov‡	C	6	0	1	1	1	0	—	—	—	—	—	—
49	Danny Bois	RW	1	0	0	0	0	7	—	—	—	—	—	—
29	Martin Gerber	G	29	0	0	0		0	—	—	—	—	—	—
41	Tomas Malec‡	D	1	0	0	0	0	0	—	—	—	—	—	—
2	Lawrence Nycholat†	D	1	0	0	0	0	0	—	—	—	—	—	—
43	Serge Payer	C	5	0	0	0	−1	0	—	—	—	—	—	—

=== Goaltending ===
No.	Player	Regular season										Playoffs								
No.	Player	GP	W	L	OT	SA	GA	GAA	SV%	SO	TOI	GP	W	L	SA	GA	GAA	SV%	SO	TOI
1	Ray Emery	58	33	16	6	1691	138	2.47	.918	5	3351	20	13	7	505	47	2.26	.907	3	1249
29	Martin Gerber	29	15	9	3	784	74	2.78	.906	1	1599	—	—	—	—	—	—	—	—	—

== Awards and records ==
=== Awards ===
Type	Award/honour	Recipient	Ref
League (annual)	NHL First All-Star Team	Dany Heatley (Right wing)	
League (in-season)	NHL All-Star Game selection	Dany Heatley	
League (in-season)	NHL First Star of the Month	Dany Heatley (January)	
League (in-season)	NHL First Star of the Week	Ray Emery (December 31)	
League (in-season)	NHL First Star of the Week	Daniel Alfredsson (January 14)	
League (in-season)	NHL Second Star of the Week	Dany Heatley (January 7)	
League (in-season)	NHL YoungStars Game selection	Patrick Eaves	
League (in-season)	NHL YoungStars Game selection	Andrej Meszaros	
Team	Molson Cup	Ray Emery	

=== Milestones ===
Milestone	Player	Date	Ref
First game	Alexei Kaigorodov	October 14, 2006	
First game	Danny Bois	December 6, 2006	
First game	Josh Hennessy	December 12, 2006	

== Transactions ==
The Senators were involved in the following transactions from June 20, 2006, the day after the deciding game of the 2006 Stanley Cup Final, through June 6, 2007, the day of the deciding game of the 2007 Stanley Cup Final.

=== Trades ===
Date	Details		Ref
July 10, 2006	To Chicago Blackhawks: Martin Havlat; Bryan Smolinski	To Ottawa Senators: Michal Barinka; Josh Hennessy; Tom Preissing; 2nd-round pick in 2008	
January 3, 2007	To Phoenix Coyotes: Alexei Kaigorodov	To Ottawa Senators: Mike Comrie	
January 5, 2007	To New York Islanders: Tomas Malec	To Ottawa Senators: Matt Koalska	
February 26, 2007	To Washington Capitals: Andy Hedlund; 6th-round pick in 2007	To Ottawa Senators: Lawrence Nycholat	
February 27, 2007	To Phoenix Coyotes: 2nd-round pick in 2008	To Ottawa Senators: Oleg Saprykin; 7th-round pick in 2007	

=== Players acquired ===
Date	Player	Former team	Term	Via	Ref
July 1, 2006	Joe Corvo	Los Angeles Kings	4-year	Free agency	
July 1, 2006	Martin Gerber	Carolina Hurricanes	3-year	Free agency	
July 13, 2006	Bobby Robins	Binghamton Senators (AHL)	1-year	Free agency	
July 17, 2006	Ryan Vesce	Springfield Falcons (AHL)	1-year	Free agency	
July 26, 2006	Jamie Allison	Florida Panthers	1-year	Free agency	
July 26, 2006	Cory Pecker	Binghamton Senators (AHL)	1-year	Free agency	
July 28, 2006	Brian Maloney	Atlanta Thrashers	1-year	Free agency	
August 2, 2006	Dean McAmmond	St. Louis Blues	1-year	Free agency	
August 2, 2006	Serge Payer	Florida Panthers	1-year	Free agency	
April 12, 2007	Derek Smith	Lake Superior State University (CCHA)	2-year	Free agency	

=== Players lost ===
Date	Player	New team	Via (Note: In parentheses is the player's free agency group on July 1 if applicable.)	Ref
July 1, 2006	Tyler Arnason	Colorado Avalanche	Free agency (UFA)	
July 1, 2006	Zdeno Chara	Boston Bruins	Free agency (III)	
July 1, 2006	Brian Pothier	Washington Capitals	Free agency (III)	
July 2, 2006	Mike Morrison	Phoenix Coyotes	Free agency (VI)	
July 3, 2006	Glen Metropolit	Atlanta Thrashers	Free agency (III)	
July 12, 2006	Charlie Stephens	DEG Metro Stars (DEL)	Free agency (VI)	
July 25, 2006	Billy Thompson	New York Islanders	Free agency (UFA)	
July 31, 2006	Dominik Hasek	Detroit Red Wings	Free agency (III)	
August 8, 2006	Brad Norton	Detroit Red Wings	Free agency (III)	
August 9, 2006	Filip Novak	Columbus Blue Jackets	Free agency (UFA)	
August 10, 2006	Vaclav Varada	HC Davos (NLA)	Free agency (III)	
August 14, 2006	Steve Martins	Chicago Wolves (AHL)	Free agency (III)	
August 16, 2006	Brett Clouthier	Sheffield Steelers (EIHL)	Free agency (VI)	
August 16, 2006	Greg Watson	Pensacola Ice Pilots (ECHL)	Free agency (UFA)	
October 4, 2006	Brennan Evans	Worcester Sharks (AHL)	Free agency (UFA)	
November 3, 2006	Joe Cullen	Dayton Bombers (ECHL)	Free agency (UFA)	
February 10, 2007	Denis Hamel	Atlanta Thrashers	Waivers	
May 30, 2007	Cory Pecker	Lausanne HC (NLA)	Free agency	

=== Signings ===
Date	Player	Term	Contract type	Ref
June 30, 2006	Wade Redden	2-year	Re-signing	
July 3, 2006	Jason Spezza	2-year	Re-signing	
July 6, 2006	Ray Emery	1-year	Re-signing	
July 13, 2006	Jeff Heerema	1-year	Re-signing	
July 13, 2006	Neil Komadoski	1-year	Re-signing	
July 17, 2006	Christoph Schubert	1-year	Re-signing	
July 18, 2006	Antoine Vermette	multi-year	Re-signing	
July 25, 2006	Chris Kelly	1-year	Re-signing	
July 26, 2006	Chris Neil	3-year	Re-signing	
July 28, 2006	Peter Schaefer	4-year	Re-signing	
September 5, 2006	Tomas Malec		Re-signing	
September 12, 2006	Alexei Kaigorodov	2-year	Entry-level	
October 10, 2006	Tomas Kudelka	3-year	Entry-level	
March 21, 2007	Brian Elliott		Entry-level	
March 21, 2007	Nick Foligno		Entry-level	
March 30, 2007	Shawn Weller		Entry-level	
April 9, 2007	Anton Volchenkov	3-year	Extension	
April 11, 2007	Chris Phillips	4-year	Extension	
June 1, 2007	Kaspars Daugavins		Entry-level	
June 1, 2007	Mattias Karlsson		Entry-level	
June 1, 2007	Alexander Nikulin		Entry-level	

== Draft picks ==
Ottawa's picks at the 2006 NHL entry draft in Vancouver, British Columbia.

Round	#	Player	Nationality	College/Junior/Club team (League)
1	28	Nick Foligno (LW)	United States	Sudbury Wolves (OHL)
3	68	Eric Gryba (D)	Canada	Green Bay Gamblers (USHL)
3	91	Kaspars Daugavins (LW)	Latvia	HK Riga 2000 (LHL)
4	121	Pierre-Luc Lessard (D)	Canada	Gatineau Olympiques (QMJHL)
5	151	Ryan Daniels (G)	Canada	Saginaw Spirit (OHL)
6	181	Kevin Koopman (D)	Canada	Beaver Valley Nitehawks (KIJHL)
7	211	Erik Condra (RW)	United States	University of Notre Dame (NCAA)

Notes:

- The 3rd-round pick used to select Eric Gryba was acquired in a trade from the Boston Bruins.

== Farm teams ==
=== Binghamton Senators ===
The Senators retained head coach Dave Cameron for the 2006–07 season.

Binghamton struggled to a 23–48–4–5 record, earning 55 points as the club finished in last place in the league. This was the second consecutive season that the Senators failed to make the post-season.

Jeff Heerema led the club with 36 goals and 67 points. Kelly Guard had a team high 11 victories with a 3.42 GAA and a .895 save percentage.

=== Charlotte Checkers ===
The Senators continued their shared affiliation of the Charlotte Checkers with the New York Rangers for the 2006–07 season. Derek Wilkinson continued as head coach of the club.

The Checkers qualified for the playoffs with a 42–27–1–2 record, earning 87 points as the team finished in fourth place in the Southern Division. In the post-season, Charlotte defeated the Augusta Lynx before losing to the Florida Everblades in the divisional semi-finals.

Mark Lee led the team with 80 points, while Bruce Graham scored a team-high 33 goals. Chris Holt earned 24 wins to lead the team and Alex Westlund led the club with a 2.73 GAA with a .914 save percentage.

== See also ==
- 2006–07 NHL season
