= 2006–07 New York Islanders season =

NHL hockey team season

2006–07 New York Islanders
- Division: 4th Atlantic
- Conference: 8th Eastern
- 2006–07 record: 40–30–12
- Home record: 22–13–6
- Road record: 18–17–6
- Goals for: 248
- Goals against: 240

Team information
- General manager: Neil Smith (Jun.–Jul.); Garth Snow (Jul.–Apr.)
- Coach: Ted Nolan
- Captain: Alexei Yashin
- Alternate captains: Mike Sillinger; Brendan Witt
- Arena: Nassau Veterans Memorial Coliseum
- Average attendance: 12,886 (capacity 16,234)
- Minor league affiliate: Bridgeport Sound Tigers

Team leaders
- Goals: Jason Blake (40)
- Assists: Tom Poti (38)
- Points: Jason Blake (69)
- Penalty minutes: Brendan Witt (131)
- Plus/minus: Radek Martinek (+19)
- Wins: Rick DiPietro (32)
- Goals against average: Wade Dubielewicz (2.06)

The 2006–07 New York Islanders season was the 35th season in the franchise's history. They qualified for the playoffs in the last game of the regular season for the first time since 2004. They lost to the Buffalo Sabres in the first round, 4–1.

== Off-season ==
After the Islanders' upper management cleaned out the team's front office during the 2005–06 season, owner Charles Wang needed to find a new coach and general manager (GM). Initially, he hired Ted Nolan as coach and Neil Smith as GM, but Smith was removed after a few weeks on the job. Wang envisioned team management making decisions by committee, and Smith was uncomfortable working without the large amount of control that NHL managers usually have. Wang hired Garth Snow, who was the team's backup goalie the prior year, to take over. Pat LaFontaine, who had intended to return to the team as senior advisor to the owner, resigned the post the same day that Smith was fired. Reports indicated that LaFontaine decided the fit was not right for him after Wang ignored his advice to wait a few days before making a final decision about Smith.

Prior to Smith's firing, the Islanders made several free agent acquisitions, including defensemen Brendan Witt and Tom Poti and forwards Mike Sillinger and Chris Simon. Andy Hilbert, Sean Hill, Viktor Kozlov and Richard Park signed on after Smith was dismissed. Additionally, in a controversial move, the Islanders signed goaltender Rick DiPietro to a 15-year, $67.5 million contract, among the longest in professional sports history.

== Regular season ==
The Islanders opened the season on a losing streak, but then began to play well enough to temporarily move into first place in the Atlantic Division by December. On December 16, 2006, the Islanders traded Alexei Zhitnik to the Philadelphia Flyers for defenseman Freddy Meyer and a conditional third round draft pick. On December 20, they then traded forward Mike York to the Flyers for forward Randy Robitaille and a fifth-round pick in 2008.

Starting at the end of December, the Islanders went on a seven-game losing streak, which ended with a victory over the Rangers. Since then, the Islanders hovered around the last playoff spot. In advance of the February NHL trade deadline, the Isles made a pair of deals with the Edmonton Oilers. On February 18, 2007, the Islanders traded defense prospect Denis Grebeshkov for defenseman Marc-Andre Bergeron and a third-round pick in 2008.

Sitting in sixth place in the Eastern Conference at the trade deadline, the team sent a first-round draft pick and prospects Robert Nilsson and Ryan O'Marra to the Oilers for NHL All-Star Ryan Smyth and acquired Richard Zednik for a second-round pick. However, the team suffered a series of losses down the stretch. Journalists cited two reasons for the team's apparent demise: Chris Simon's suspension for striking Ryan Hollweg with his stick, and Rick DiPietro's multiple concussions, which forced him to miss several crucial games. Backup goaltender Mike Dunham had several poor showings with DiPietro out, which prompted the team to call on third-stringer Wade Dubielewicz, who fared better.

Coming into the last four games of the season, the Islanders play had improved, but a playoff spot still appeared out of reach. However, the team won each game and received some help from the Montreal Canadiens and Toronto Maple Leafs, who failed to win enough games to edge the Isles out. The Isles clinched with a shootout win over the New Jersey Devils, in which Dubielewicz poke-checked Sergei Brylin to secure the victory. The team expressed pride that they qualified because many NHL preview predictions had the Isles slated to finish at or near the bottom of the standings. They lost their first round matchup with the Buffalo Sabres, however, the NHL's best team during the regular season, in five games.

=== Season standings ===
Atlantic Division
No.	CR		GP	W	L	OTL	GF	GA	Pts
1	2	**New Jersey Devils**	82	49	24	9	216	201	107
2	5	**Pittsburgh Penguins**	82	47	24	11	277	246	105
3	6	**New York Rangers**	82	42	30	10	242	216	94
4	8	**New York Islanders**	82	40	30	12	248	240	92
5	15	Philadelphia Flyers	82	22	48	12	214	303	56

Note: No. = Division rank, CR = Conference rank, W = Wins, L = Losses, T = Ties, GF = Goals For, GA = Goals Against, Pts = Points
Teams that qualified for the playoffs are highlighted in bold.

Eastern Conference
R		Div	GP	W	L	OTL	GF	GA	Pts
**1**	**P -** Buffalo Sabres	**NE**	**82**	**53**	**22**	**7**	**308**	**242**	113
**2**	**Y -** New Jersey Devils	**AT**	**82**	**49**	**24**	**9**	**216**	**201**	107
**3**	**Y -** Atlanta Thrashers	**SE**	**82**	**43**	**28**	**11**	**246**	**245**	97
**4**	**X -** Ottawa Senators	**NE**	**82**	**48**	**25**	**9**	**288**	**222**	105
**5**	**X -** Pittsburgh Penguins	**AT**	**82**	**47**	**24**	**11**	**277**	**246**	105
**6**	**X -** New York Rangers	**AT**	**82**	**42**	**30**	**10**	**242**	**216**	94
**7**	**X -** Tampa Bay Lightning	**SE**	**82**	**44**	**33**	**5**	**253**	**261**	93
**8**	**X -** New York Islanders	**AT**	**82**	**40**	**30**	**12**	**248**	**240**	92
8.5
9	Toronto Maple Leafs	NE	82	40	31	11	258	269	91
10	Montreal Canadiens	NE	82	42	34	6	245	256	90
11	Carolina Hurricanes	SE	82	40	34	8	241	253	88
12	Florida Panthers	SE	82	35	31	16	247	257	86
13	Boston Bruins	NE	82	35	41	6	219	289	76
14	Washington Capitals	SE	82	28	40	14	235	286	70
15	Philadelphia Flyers	AT	82	22	48	12	214	303	56

Divisions: AT – Atlantic, NE – Northeast, SE – Southeast

P – Clinched Presidents Trophy; Y – Clinched division; X – Clinched playoff spot

== Playoffs ==
The New York Islanders earned the eighth seed in the Eastern Conference.

== Schedule and results ==
=== Regular season ===
2006–07 regular season
October: 5–4–2 (home: 4–1–2; road: 1–3–0)

Game	Date	Visitor	Score	Home	OT	Decision	Attendance	Record	Points	Recap
1	October 5	NY Islanders	3 – 6	Phoenix		DiPietro	15,301	0–1–0	0	L
2	October 7	NY Islanders	0 – 2	San Jose		DiPietro	17,496	0–2–0	0	L
3	October 10	NY Islanders	2 – 4	Los Angeles		DiPietro	14,394	0–3–0	0	L
4	October 11	NY Islanders	5 – 4	Anaheim	SO	Dunham	12,394	1–3–0	2	W
5	October 14	Boston	1 – 4	NY Islanders		Dunham	14,732	2–3–0	4	W
6	October 16	Nashville	2 – 1	NY Islanders	SO	Dunham	9,431	2–3–1	5	OTL
7	October 19	Pittsburgh	4 – 3	NY Islanders	OT	Dunham	10,258	2–3–2	6	OTL
8	October 21	Carolina	3 – 4	NY Islanders	OT	DiPietro	12,349	3–3–2	8	W
9	October 26	Buffalo	3 – 0	NY Islanders		DiPietro	8,861	3–4–2	8	L
10	October 28	Florida	3 – 4	NY Islanders	SO	DiPietro	10,455	4–4–2	10	W
11	October 31	Chicago	2 – 5	NY Islanders		DiPietro	8,739	5–4–2	12	W

November: 7–5–1 (home: 3–3–0; road: 4–2–1)

Game	Date	Visitor	Score	Home	OT	Decision	Attendance	Record	Points	Recap
12	November 2	NY Islanders	5 – 2	New Jersey		DiPietro	8,269	6–4–2	14	W
13	November 4	Atlanta	4 – 1	NY Islanders		DiPietro	12,394	6–5–2	14	L
14	November 6	Tampa Bay	5 – 1	NY Islanders		Dunham	9,693	6–6–2	14	L
15	November 9	NY Islanders	3 – 1	Philadelphia		DiPietro	18,656	7–6–2	16	W
16	November 15	NY Islanders	3 – 0	Dallas		DiPietro	17,643	7–7–2	16	W
17	November 17	NY Islanders	2 – 3	Tampa Bay	SO	DiPietro	19,919	7–7–3	17	OTL
18	November 18	NY Islanders	4 – 1	Florida		Dunham	16,833	8–7–3	19	W
19	November 20	NY Islanders	2 – 4	Toronto		DiPietro	19,392	8–8–3	19	L
20	November 22	Carolina	2 – 4	NY Islanders		DiPietro	12,419	9–8–3	21	W
21	November 24	Pittsburgh	1 – 3	NY Islanders		DiPietro	15,625	10–8–3	23	W
22	November 25	Washington	1 – 4	NY Islanders		DiPietro	13,214	11–8–3	25	W
23	November 28	NY Islanders	2 – 3	Pittsburgh		DiPietro	17,082	12–8–3	27	L
24	November 30	Philadelphia	3 – 2	NY Islanders		Dunham	10,280	12–9–3	27	L

December: 7–6–0 (home: 4–3–0; road: 3–3–0)

Game	Date	Visitor	Score	Home	OT	Decision	Attendance	Record	Points	Recap
25	December 2	NY Islanders	5 – 3	Pittsburgh		DiPietro	17,025	13–9–3	29	W
26	December 3	NY Islanders	7 – 4	NY Rangers		DiPietro	18,200	14–9–3	31	W
27	December 5	Ottawa	4 – 2	NY Islanders		Dunham	8,741	14–10–3	31	L
28	December 7	Montreal	4 – 2	NY Islanders		DiPietro	9,551	14–11–3	31	L
29	December 9	Florida	4 – 5	NY Islanders	SO	DiPietro	12,825	15–11–3	33	W
30	December 15	NY Islanders	4 – 7	Pittsburgh		DiPietro	17,028	15–12–3	33	L
31	December 16	Atlanta	0 – 6	NY Islanders		DiPietro	10,452	16–12–3	35	W
32	December 19	NY Islanders	4 – 3	NY Rangers		DiPietro	18,200	17–12–3	37	W
33	December 22	NY Islanders	1 – 5	Carolina		DiPietro	18,252	17–13–3	37	L
34	December 23	Columbus	0 – 4	NY Islanders		DiPietro	11,797	18–13–3	39	W
35	December 26	NY Rangers	0 – 2	NY Islanders		DiPietro	16,234	19–13–3	41	W
36	December 27	NY Islanders	0 – 2	Ottawa		DiPietro	20,192	19–14–3	41	L
37	December 30	New Jersey	2 – 0	NY Islanders		DiPietro	16,234	19–15–3	41	L

January: 4–6–3 (home: 1–2–2; road: 3–4–1)

Game	Date	Visitor	Score	Home	OT	Decision	Attendance	Record	Points	Recap
38	January 1	NY Islanders	1 – 3	Buffalo		DiPietro	18,690	19–16–3	41	L
39	January 2	Philadelphia	3 – 2	NY Islanders		Dunham	10,461	19–17–3	41	L
40	January 4	NY Islanders	3 – 4	New Jersey		DiPietro	12,529	19–18–3	41	L
41	January 6	NY Islanders	2 – 4	Carolina		DiPietro	18,639	19–19–3	41	L
42	January 9	NY Islanders	5 – 3	NY Rangers		DiPietro	18,200	20–19–3	43	W
43	January 11	NY Islanders	5 – 4	Boston	SO	DiPietro	13,529	21–19–3	45	W
44	January 13	New Jersey	2 – 1	NY Islanders	OT	DiPietro	16,234	21–19–4	46	OTL
45	January 15	Tampa Bay	4 – 3	NY Islanders		DiPietro	15,426	21–20–4	46	L
46	January 16	NY Islanders	2 – 5	Pittsburgh		Dunham	16,958	21–21–4	46	L
47	January 18	NY Islanders	4 – 2	Philadelphia		DiPietro	19,118	22–21–4	48	W
48	January 26	NY Islanders	4 – 5	Atlanta	OT	Dunham	18,089	22–21–5	49	OTL
49	January 27	Buffalo	3 – 5	NY Islanders		DiPietro	15,218	23–21–5	51	W
50	January 30	Detroit	3 – 4	NY Islanders	OT	DiPietro	12,322	23–21–6	52	OTL

February: 9–2–2 (home: 6–1–0; road: 3–1–2)

Game	Date	Visitor	Score	Home	OT	Decision	Attendance	Record	Points	Recap
51	February 1	NY Islanders	5 – 2	Atlanta		Dunham	13,543	24–21–6	54	W
52	February 3	NY Islanders	4 – 2	Montreal		DiPietro	21,273	25–21–6	56	W
53	February 4	NY Islanders	1 – 2	Washington	SO	DiPietro	12,508	25–21–7	57	OTL
54	February 7	Philadelphia	0 – 2	NY Islanders		DiPietro	10,229	26–21–7	59	W
55	February 8	NY Islanders	0 – 2	New Jersey		DiPietro	10,110	26–22–7	59	L
56	February 10	NY Islanders	3 – 4	Boston	SO	DiPietro	16,854	26–21–8	60	OTL
57	February 13	NY Islanders	3 – 2	Toronto	SO	DiPietro	19,600	27–21–8	62	W
58	February 15	Boston	1 – 4	NY Islanders		DiPietro	10,079	28–22–8	64	W
59	February 17	New Jersey	2 – 0	NY Islanders		DiPietro	15,223	28–23–8	64	L
60	February 19	Pittsburgh	5 – 6	NY Islanders		DiPietro	15,472	29–23–8	66	W
61	February 22	Toronto	2 – 3	NY Islanders	SO	DiPietro	11,759	30–23–8	68	W
62	February 24	Montreal	2 – 3	NY Islanders		DiPietro	16,234	31–23–8	70	W
63	February 27	Philadelphia	5 – 6	NY Islanders		DiPietro	11,443	32–23–8	72	W

March: 4–7–4 (home: 2–3–1; road: 2–4–3)

Game	Date	Visitor	Score	Home	OT	Decision	Attendance	Record	Points	Recap
64	March 1	St. Louis	3 – 2	NY Islanders	OT	DiPietro	12,263	32–23–9	73	OTL
65	March 3	NY Islanders	6 – 2	Washington		DiPietro	16,453	33–23–9	75	W
66	March 5	NY Islanders	1 – 2	NY Rangers	SO	DiPietro	18,200	33–23–10	76	OTL
67	March 8	NY Rangers	2 – 1	NY Islanders		DiPietro	16,234	33–24–10	76	L
68	March 10	Washington	2 – 5	NY Islanders		DiPietro	15,764	34–24–10	78	W
69	March 13	NY Islanders	3 – 5	Montreal		Dunham	21,273	34–25–10	78	L
70	March 15	NY Islanders	1 – 5	Ottawa		Dunham	19,989	34–26–10	78	L
71	March 17	NY Islanders	5 – 8	Florida		Dunham	17,078	34–27–10	78	L
72	March 20	NY Islanders	3 – 4	Tampa Bay	OT	DiPietro	19,916	34–27–11	79	OTL
73	March 22	Pittsburgh	1 – 3	NY Islanders		DiPietro	14,574	35–27–11	81	W
74	March 24	NY Islanders	4 – 3	Philadelphia		DiPietro	19,422	36–27–11	83	W
75	March 25	NY Islanders	1 – 2	NY Rangers	OT	DiPietro	16,234	36–27–12	84	OTL
76	March 27	New Jersey	2 – 3	NY Islanders		Dunham	13,337	36–28–12	84	L
77	March 30	NY Islanders	4 – 6	Buffalo		Dunham	18,690	36–29–12	84	L
78	March 31	Ottawa	5 – 2	NY Islanders		Dubielewicz	15,598	36–30–12	84	L

April: 4–0–0 (home: 2–0–0; road: 2–0–0)

Game	Date	Visitor	Score	Home	OT	Decision	Attendance	Record	Points	Recap
79	April 3	NY Rangers	2 – 3	NY Islanders	SO	Dubielewicz	15,591	37–30–12	86	W
80	April 5	Toronto	2 – 5	NY Islanders		Dubielewicz	14,352	38–30–12	88	W
81	April 7	NY Islanders	4 – 2	Philadelphia		Dubielewicz	19,412	39–30–12	90	W
82	April 8	NY Islanders	3 – 2	New Jersey	SO	Dubielewicz	18,111	40–30–12	92	W

Legend: W Win (2 points) L Loss (0 points) OTL Overtime/shootout loss (1 point)

=== Playoffs ===
2007 Stanley Cup playoffs
Eastern Conference Quarterfinals vs. (1) Buffalo Sabres – Sabres win 4–1

Game	Date	Visitor	Score	Home	OT	Decision	Attendance	Series	Recap
1	April 12	NY Islanders	1 – 4	Buffalo		Dubielewicz	18,690	0 – 1	L
2	April 14	NY Islanders	3 – 2	Buffalo		DiPietro	18,690	1 – 1	W
3	April 16	Buffalo	3 – 2	NY Islanders		DiPietro	16,234	1 – 2	L
4	April 18	Buffalo	4 – 2	NY Islanders		DiPietro	16,234	1 – 3	L
5	April 20	NY Islanders	3 – 4	Buffalo		DiPietro	18,690	1 – 4	L

Legend: W Win L Loss

== Player statistics ==
=== Scoring ===
- Position abbreviations: C = Center; D = Defense; G = Goaltender; LW = Left wing; RW = Right wing
- † = Joined team via a transaction (e.g., trade, waivers, signing) during the season. Stats reflect time with the Islanders only.
- ‡ = Left team via a transaction (e.g., trade, waivers, release) during the season. Stats reflect time with the Islanders only.

No.	Player	Pos	Regular season						Playoffs					
No.	Player	Pos	GP	G	A	Pts	+/-	PIM	GP	G	A	Pts	+/-	PIM
55	Jason Blake	C	82	40	29	69	1	34	5	1	2	3	−2	2
81	Miroslav Satan	LW	81	27	32	59	−12	46	5	1	2	3	0	0
18	Mike Sillinger	C	82	26	33	59	5	46	5	1	1	2	−1	2
25	Viktor Kozlov	C	81	25	26	51	12	28	5	0	2	2	−2	2
79	Alexei Yashin	C	58	18	32	50	6	44	5	0	0	0	0	0
3	Tom Poti	D	78	6	38	44	−1	74	5	0	3	3	0	6
7	Trent Hunter	RW	77	20	15	35	5	22	5	3	0	3	1	0
11	Andy Hilbert	C	81	8	20	28	10	34	5	0	0	0	−1	2
12	Chris Simon	LW	67	10	17	27	17	75	—	—	—	—	—	—
10	Richard Park	RW	82	10	16	26	4	33	5	0	1	1	0	2
6	Sean Hill	D	81	1	24	25	6	110	4	0	0	0	−1	0
45	Arron Asham	RW	80	11	12	23	3	63	5	1	0	1	−3	0
27	Randy Robitaille†	C	50	6	17	23	−2	22	5	0	2	2	−5	8
47	Marc-Andre Bergeron†	D	23	6	15	21	5	10	5	1	1	2	1	6
24	Radek Martinek	D	43	2	15	17	19	40	—	—	—	—	—	—
94	Ryan Smyth†	LW	18	5	10	15	0	14	5	1	3	4	1	4
14	Chris Campoli	D	51	1	13	14	−3	23	5	1	1	2	−1	2
32	Brendan Witt	D	81	1	13	14	14	131	5	0	1	1	−3	6
16	Mike York‡	LW	32	6	7	13	−9	14	—	—	—	—	—	—
77	Alexei Zhitnik‡	D	30	2	9	11	13	40	—	—	—	—	—	—
17	Shawn Bates	C	48	4	6	10	13	34	—	—	—	—	—	—
15	Jeff Tambellini	LW	23	2	7	9	6	6	—	—	—	—	—	—
8	Bruno Gervais	D	51	0	6	6	−10	28	5	1	1	2	−2	2
20	Richard Zednik†	RW	10	1	2	3	−2	2	5	0	0	0	−1	8
44	Freddy Meyer†	D	35	0	3	3	0	24	—	—	—	—	—	—
51	Frans Nielsen	C	15	1	1	2	−2	0	—	—	—	—	—	—
39	Rick DiPietro	G	62	0	2	2		24	4	0	0	0		0
49	Drew Fata†	D	3	1	0	1	−2	5	1	0	0	0	−2	0
1	Mike Dunham	G	19	0	1	1		0	—	—	—	—	—	—
38	Allan Rourke	D	11	0	1	1	0	4	—	—	—	—	—	—
33	Eric Boguniecki†	C	11	0	0	0	0	8	—	—	—	—	—	—
27	Jeremy Colliton	C	1	0	0	0	−1	0	—	—	—	—	—	—
57	Blake Comeau	RW	3	0	0	0	0	0	—	—	—	—	—	—
34	Wade Dubielewicz	G	8	0	0	0		0	1	0	0	0		0
21	Deron Quint†	D	5	0	0	0	0	0	—	—	—	—	—	—
48	Steve Regier	LW	1	0	0	0	0	0	—	—	—	—	—	—

=== Goaltending ===
No.	Player	Regular season										Playoffs								
No.	Player	GP	W	L	OT	SA	GA	GAA	SV%	SO	TOI	GP	W	L	SA	GA	GAA	SV%	SO	TOI
39	Rick DiPietro	62	32	19	9	1917	156	2.58	.919	5	3627	4	1	3	127	13	3.30	.898	0	236
1	Mike Dunham	19	4	10	3	552	61	3.74	.889	0	979	—	—	—	—	—	—	—	—	—
34	Wade Dubielewicz	8	4	1	0	198	13	2.06	.934	0	379	1	0	1	35	4	4.06	.886	0	59

== Awards and records ==
=== Awards ===
Type	Award/honor	Recipient	Ref
League (in-season)	NHL All-Star Game selection	Jason Blake	
League (in-season)	NHL First Star of the Week	Viktor Kozlov (December 3)	
League (in-season)	NHL First Star of the Week	Wade Dubielewicz (April 8)	
League (in-season)	NHL Second Star of the Month	Rick DiPietro (February)	
Team	Bob Nystrom Award	Trent Hunter	

=== Milestones ===
Milestone	Player	Date	Ref
First game	Blake Comeau	December 7, 2006	
First game	Frans Nielsen	January 6, 2007	
First game	Drew Fata	February 4, 2007	

== Transactions ==
The Islanders were involved in the following transactions from June 20, 2006, the day after the deciding game of the 2006 Stanley Cup Finals, through June 6, 2007, the day of the deciding game of the 2007 Stanley Cup Finals.

=== Trades ===
Date	Details		Ref
June 24, 2006	To New York Islanders: 4th-round pick in 2006; Chicago's 5th-round pick in 2006	To Boston Bruins: Phoenix's 3rd-round pick in 2006	
June 24, 2006	To New York Islanders: Philadelphia's 4th-round pick in 2006; Calgary's 4th-round pick in 2006	To Phoenix Coyotes: New Jersey's 3rd-round pick in 2006	
June 24, 2006	To New York Islanders: Tampa Bay's 4th-round pick in 2006; 6th-round pick in 2006	To San Jose Sharks: Boston's 4th-round pick in 2006	
June 24, 2006	To New York Islanders: 5th-round pick in 2006; 6th-round pick in 2006	To Colorado Avalanche: Edmonton's 4th-round pick in 2006	
October 25, 2006	To New York Islanders: Eric Boguniecki	To Columbus Blue Jackets: Ryan Caldwell	
December 16, 2006	To New York Islanders: Freddy Meyer; Conditional draft pick (Note: The Islanders had a choice between the Flyers' third-round pick in 2007 or the Flyers' second-round pick in 2008. The Islanders chose the 2007 third-round pick.)	To Philadelphia Flyers: Alexei Zhitnik	
December 20, 2006	To New York Islanders: Randy Robitaille; 5th-round pick in 2008	To Philadelphia Flyers: Mike York	
January 5, 2007	To New York Islanders: Tomas Malec	To Ottawa Senators: Matt Koalska	
February 18, 2007	To New York Islanders: Marc-Andre Bergeron; 3rd-round pick in 2008	To Edmonton Oilers: Denis Grebeshkov	
February 26, 2007	To New York Islanders: Richard Zednik	To Washington Capitals: 2nd-round pick in 2007	
February 27, 2007	To New York Islanders: Ryan Smyth	To Edmonton Oilers: Robert Nilsson; Ryan O'Marra; 1st-round pick in 2007	

=== Players acquired ===
Date	Player	Former team	Term	Via	Ref
July 2, 2006	Mike Sillinger	Nashville Predators	3-year	Free agency	
July 3, 2006	Brendan Witt	Nashville Predators	3-year	Free agency	
July 4, 2006	Andy Hilbert	Pittsburgh Penguins	1-year	Free agency	
July 8, 2006	Tom Poti	New York Rangers	1-year	Free agency	
July 11, 2006	Chris Simon	Calgary Flames	1-year	Free agency	
July 20, 2006	Rick Berry	Nashville Predators	1-year	Free agency	
July 25, 2006	Billy Thompson	Ottawa Senators	1-year	Free agency	
July 27, 2006	Mark Wotton	Washington Capitals	2-year	Free agency	
August 15, 2006	Sean Hill	Florida Panthers	1-year	Free agency	
August 28, 2006	Peter Ferraro	DEG Metro Stars (DEL)	1-year	Free agency	
September 13, 2006	Viktor Kozlov	New Jersey Devils	1-year	Free agency	
September 29, 2006	Mike Dunham	Atlanta Thrashers	1-year	Free agency	
October 2, 2006	Richard Park	Vancouver Canucks	2-year	Free agency	
February 4, 2007	Drew Fata	Bridgeport Sound Tigers (AHL)		Free agency	
February 22, 2007	Jamie Fraser	Bridgeport Sound Tigers (AHL)		Free agency	
March 29, 2007	Todd Simpson	Hannover Scorpions (DEL)	1-year	Free agency	
March 30, 2007	Deron Quint	Eisbaren Berlin (DEL)	1-year	Free agency	
April 2, 2007	Trevor Smith	University of New Hampshire (HE)	2-year	Free agency	
May 21, 2007	Sean Bentivoglio	Providence Bruins (AHL)	3-year	Free agency	

=== Players lost ===
Date	Player	New team	Via (Note: In parentheses is the player's free agency group on July 1 if applicable.)	Ref
June 21, 2006	Cole Jarrett	Eisbaren Berlin (DEL)	Free agency (UFA)	
July 1, 2006	Chris Madden (Note: Madden retired.)		Contract expiration (UFA)	
July 1, 2006	Jody Robinson (Note: Robinson suffered a career-ending injury on November 11, 2005.)		Contract expiration (UFA)	
July 4, 2006	Keith Aldridge		Retirement (III)	
July 10, 2006	Denis Grebeshkov	Lokomotiv Yaroslavl (RSL)	Free agency (II) (Note: The Islanders retained Grebeshkov's NHL rights and traded him to the Edmonton Oilers on February 18, 2007.)	
July 12, 2006	Rob Collins	DEG Metro Stars (DEL)	Free agency (UFA)	
July 18, 2006	Garth Snow		Retirement	
July 19, 2006	Wyatt Smith	Minnesota Wild	Free agency (III)	
August 5, 2006	Sean Bergenheim	Lokomotiv Yaroslavl (RSL)	Free agency (II) (Note: The Islanders retained Bergenheim's NHL rights and re-signed him on June 18, 2007.)	
August 10, 2006	Eric Godard	Calgary Flames	Free agency (UFA)	
August 10, 2006	Justin Papineau	New Jersey Devils	Free agency (UFA)	
August 31, 2006	Dmitri Nabokov	HC Sibir Novosibirsk (RSL)	Free agency (III)	
September 7, 2006	Paul Flache	Gwinnett Gladiators (ECHL)	Free agency (UFA)	
September 14, 2006	John Erskine	Washington Capitals	Free agency (UFA)	
September 22, 2006	Frederic Cloutier	Rockford IceHogs (UHL)	Free agency (VI)	
September 25, 2006	Vince Macri	Fresno Falcons (ECHL)	Free agency (UFA)	
September 29, 2006	Jeff Hamilton	Chicago Blackhawks	Free agency (VI)	
December 1, 2006	Johan Halvardsson	HV71 (SHL)	Free agency	
May 1, 2007	Tomas Malec	HC Ocelari Trinec (ELH)	Free agency	
May 18, 2007	Randy Robitaille	Lokomotiv Yaroslavl (RSL)	Free agency	

=== Signings ===
Date	Player	Term	Contract type	Ref
July 5, 2006	Joel Bouchard	1-year	Re-signing	
July 19, 2006	Wade Dubielewicz	1-year	Re-signing	
July 22, 2006	Mike York	1-year	Arbitration award	
July 24, 2006	Arron Asham	1-year	Re-signing	
July 25, 2006	Ryan Caldwell	1-year	Re-signing	
July 25, 2006	Allan Rourke	1-year	Re-signing	
July 29, 2006	Trent Hunter		Re-signing	
September 12, 2006	Rick DiPietro	15-year	Re-signing	
May 8, 2007	Wade Dubielewicz	1-year	Extension	
May 24, 2007	Andrew MacDonald	3-year	Entry-level	
May 30, 2007	Dustin Kohn	3-year	Entry-level	

== Draft picks ==
The Islanders' picks at the 2006 NHL entry draft in Vancouver, British Columbia.

Round	#	Player	Position	Nationality	College/Junior/Club team (League)
1	7	Kyle Okposo	Right wing	United States	Des Moines Buccaneers (USHL)
2	60	Jesse Joensuu	Wing	Finland	Assat (SM-liiga)
3	70	Robin Figren	Wing	Sweden	Frölunda HC (Elitserien)
4	100	Rhett Rakhshani	Right wing	United States	University of Denver (NCAA) /US National Team Development Program (NAHL)
4	108	Jase Weslosky	Goalie	Canada	Sherwood Park Crusaders (AJHL)
4	115	Tomas Marcinko	Center	Slovakia	HC Košice (Slovak Extraliga)
4	119	Doug Rogers	Center	United States	Saint Sebastian's School (Independent School League)
5	141	Kim Johansson	Wing	Sweden	Malmö Redhawks Jr.
6	160	Andrew MacDonald	Defense	Canada	Moncton Wildcats (QMJHL)
6	171	Brian Day	Right wing	United States	Governor Dummer (Independent School League)
6	173	Stefan Ridderwall	Goalie	Sweden	Djurgardens IF Jr. (J20)
7	190	Troy Mattila	Left wing	United States	Springfield Jr. Blues (NAHL)

== See also ==
- 2006–07 NHL season
