= 2006–07 Washington Capitals season =

NHL hockey team season

2006–07 Washington Capitals
- Division: 5th Southeast
- Conference: 14th Eastern
- 2006–07 record: 28–40–14
- Home record: 17–17–7
- Road record: 11–23–7
- Goals for: 235
- Goals against: 286

Team information
- General manager: George McPhee
- Coach: Glen Hanlon
- Captain: Chris Clark
- Alternate captains: Brian Sutherby; Dainius Zubrus (Oct.–Feb.); Alexander Ovechkin (Feb.–Apr.)
- Arena: Verizon Center
- Minor league affiliates: Hershey Bears; South Carolina Stingrays

Team leaders
- Goals: Alexander Ovechkin (46)
- Assists: Alexander Ovechkin (46)
- Points: Alexander Ovechkin (92)
- Penalty minutes: Donald Brashear (156)
- Plus/minus: Boyd Gordon (+10)
- Wins: Olaf Kolzig (22)
- Goals against average: Brent Johnson (3.61)

The 2006–07 Washington Capitals season was the Washington Capitals' 33rd season in the National Hockey League (NHL), and the last one in which they used their blue, black and bronze color scheme. For the third consecutive season, the Capitals failed to qualify for the playoffs for the first time since the 1979–80 season and the 1981–82 season.

== Off-season ==
Chris Clark was named team captain on September 13, replacing previous captain Jeff Halpern who signed as a free agent with the Dallas Stars.

== Regular season ==
- December 15, 2006 - Ovechkin gets the second hat trick of his career by scoring all three goals of a 3–2 overtime victory against the Atlanta Thrashers. The third goal is scored just six seconds into overtime, tying Mats Sundin and David Legwand for the fastest regular-season overtime goal ever scored.

=== Season standings ===
Southeast Division
No.	CR		GP	W	L	OTL	GF	GA	Pts
1	3	**Atlanta Thrashers**	82	43	28	11	246	245	97
2	7	**Tampa Bay Lightning**	82	44	33	5	253	261	93
3	11	Carolina Hurricanes	82	40	34	8	241	253	88
4	12	Florida Panthers	82	35	31	16	247	257	86
5	14	Washington Capitals	82	28	40	14	235	286	70

Note: No. = Division rank, CR = Conference rank, W = Wins, L = Losses, T = Ties, GF = Goals For, GA = Goals Against, Pts = Points
Teams that qualified for the playoffs are highlighted in bold.

Eastern Conference
R		Div	GP	W	L	OTL	GF	GA	Pts
**1**	**P -** Buffalo Sabres	**NE**	**82**	**53**	**22**	**7**	**308**	**242**	113
**2**	**Y -** New Jersey Devils	**AT**	**82**	**49**	**24**	**9**	**216**	**201**	107
**3**	**Y -** Atlanta Thrashers	**SE**	**82**	**43**	**28**	**11**	**246**	**245**	97
**4**	**X -** Ottawa Senators	**NE**	**82**	**48**	**25**	**9**	**288**	**222**	105
**5**	**X -** Pittsburgh Penguins	**AT**	**82**	**47**	**24**	**11**	**277**	**246**	105
**6**	**X -** New York Rangers	**AT**	**82**	**42**	**30**	**10**	**242**	**216**	94
**7**	**X -** Tampa Bay Lightning	**SE**	**82**	**44**	**33**	**5**	**253**	**261**	93
**8**	**X -** New York Islanders	**AT**	**82**	**40**	**30**	**12**	**248**	**240**	92
8.5
9	Toronto Maple Leafs	NE	82	40	31	11	258	269	91
10	Montreal Canadiens	NE	82	42	34	6	245	256	90
11	Carolina Hurricanes	SE	82	40	34	8	241	253	88
12	Florida Panthers	SE	82	35	31	16	247	257	86
13	Boston Bruins	NE	82	35	41	6	219	289	76
14	Washington Capitals	SE	82	28	40	14	235	286	70
15	Philadelphia Flyers	AT	82	22	48	12	214	303	56

Divisions: AT – Atlantic, NE – Northeast, SE – Southeast

P – Clinched Presidents Trophy; Y – Clinched division; X – Clinched playoff spot

== Schedule and results ==
2006–07 regular season
October: 4–3–4 (home: 2–1–1; road: 2–2–3)

Game	Date	Visitor	Score	Home	OT	Decision	Attendance	Record	Points	Recap
1	October 5	Washington	2 – 5	NY Rangers		Kolzig	18,200	0–1–0	0	L
2	October 7	Carolina	2 – 5	Washington		Kolzig	16,622	1–1–0	2	W
3	October 12	Washington	2 – 3	Minnesota	SO	Johnson	18,064	1–1–1	3	OTL
4	October 14	Atlanta	4 – 3	Washington	OT	Kolzig	11,995	1–1–2	4	OTL
5	October 18	Florida	2 – 5	Washington		Kolzig	10,125	2–1–2	6	W
6	October 19	Washington	3 – 4	Atlanta	SO	Johnson	12,719	2–1–3	7	OTL
7	October 21	Tampa Bay	6 – 4	Washington		Kolzig	13,327	2–2–3	7	L
8	October 25	Washington	5 – 3	Colorado		Kolzig	17,047	3–2–3	9	W
9	October 27	Washington	2 – 3	Vancouver	SO	Kolzig	18,630	3–2–4	10	OTL
10	October 28	Washington	0 – 4	Edmonton		Johnson	16,839	3–3–4	10	L
11	October 30	Washington	4 – 2	Calgary		Kolzig	19,289	4–3–4	12	W

November: 6–6–2 (home: 3–4–1; road: 3–2–1)

Game	Date	Visitor	Score	Home	OT	Decision	Attendance	Record	Points	Recap
12	November 3	Atlanta	4 – 3	Washington		Kolzig	12,834	4–4–4	12	L
13	November 4	Washington	5 – 3	Philadelphia		Johnson	19,564	5–4–4	14	W
14	November 6	Ottawa	3 – 4	Washington	OT	Johnson	10,845	6–4–4	16	W
15	November 9	Washington	0 – 5	Carolina		Johnson	18,639	6–5–4	16	L
16	November 11	NY Rangers	1 – 3	Washington		Kolzig	16,263	7–5–4	18	W
17	November 13	Washington	4 – 1	Florida		Kolzig	12,108	8–5–4	20	W
18	November 15	Boston	3 – 2	Washington	SO	Kolzig	10,878	8–5–5	21	OTL
19	November 17	Carolina	4 – 1	Washington		Kolzig	12,683	8–6–5	21	L
20	November 18	Washington	2 – 3	Boston	OT	Johnson	16,837	8–6–6	22	OTL
21	November 22	Atlanta	4 – 2	Washington		Kolzig	11,284	8–7–6	22	L
22	November 24	Toronto	7 – 1	Washington		Johnson	14,892	8–8–6	22	L
23	November 25	Washington	1 – 4	NY Islanders		Kolzig	13,214	8–9–6	22	L
24	November 28	Washington	5 – 2	Tampa Bay		Kolzig	18,874	9–9–6	24	W
25	November 30	Dallas	3 – 4	Washington		Kolzig	10,912	10–9–6	26	W

December: 6–7–1 (home: 3–4–1; road: 3–3–0)

Game	Date	Visitor	Score	Home	OT	Decision	Attendance	Record	Points	Recap
26	December 2	Buffalo	4 – 7	Washington		Kolzig	17,162	11–9–6	28	W
27	December 6	Ottawa	2 – 6	Washington		Kolzig	10,926	12–9–6	30	W
28	December 8	Anaheim	6 – 1	Washington		Kolzig	12,269	12–10–6	30	L
29	December 9	Washington	5 – 3	Philadelphia		Johnson	19,211	13–10–6	32	W
30	December 11	Pittsburgh	5 – 4	Washington	SO	Kolzig	14,793	13–10–7	33	OTL
31	December 15	Washington	3 – 2	Atlanta	OT	Johnson	16,920	14–10–7	35	W
32	December 16	Philadelphia	1 – 4	Washington		Kolzig	15,021	15–10–7	37	W
33	December 19	Tampa Bay	5 – 4	Washington		Kolzig	10,417	15–11–7	37	L
34	December 22	New Jersey	4 – 1	Washington		Johnson	13,744	15–12–7	37	L
35	December 23	Washington	3 – 2	Toronto		Kolzig	19,488	16–12–7	39	W
36	December 26	Washington	3 – 6	Buffalo		Johnson	18,690	16–13–7	39	L
37	December 27	Montreal	4 – 1	Washington		Kolzig	15,609	16–14–7	39	L
38	December 29	Washington	3 – 4	New Jersey		Kolzig	16,297	16–15–7	39	L
39	December 30	Washington	1 – 4	NY Rangers		Kolzig	18,200	16–16–7	39	L

January: 5–7–0 (home: 4–2–0; road: 1–5–0)

Game	Date	Visitor	Score	Home	OT	Decision	Attendance	Record	Points	Recap
40	January 1	Phoenix	3 – 2	Washington		Kolzig	12,579	16–17–7	39	L
41	January 4	Montreal	1 – 5	Washington		Kolzig	11,287	17–17–7	41	W
42	January 6	Atlanta	2 – 3	Washington	OT	Kolzig	15,642	18–17–7	43	W
43	January 9	Philadelphia	2 – 6	Washington		Kolzig	13,143	19–17–7	45	W
44	January 11	Washington	4 – 5	Tampa Bay		Kolzig	18,804	19–18–7	45	L
45	January 13	Washington	3 – 7	Florida		Kolzig	15,061	19–19–7	45	L
46	January 16	Washington	2 – 5	Ottawa		Johnson	18,810	19–20–7	45	L
47	January 18	Washington	5 – 2	Carolina		Kolzig	16,285	20–20–7	47	W
48	January 20	Florida	4 – 1	Washington		Kolzig	13,877	20–21–7	47	L
49	January 26	Washington	2 – 6	Carolina		Johnson	18,044	20–22–7	47	L
50	January 27	Carolina	3 – 7	Washington		Kolzig	16,924	21–22–7	49	W
51	January 30	Washington	2 – 3	Ottawa		Kolzig	19,178	21–23–7	49	L

February: 3–6–4 (home: 2–2–3; road: 1–4–1)

Game	Date	Visitor	Score	Home	OT	Decision	Attendance	Record	Points	Recap
52	February 1	Washington	3 – 6	Florida		Kolzig	11,300	21–24–7	49	L
53	February 3	Washington	0 – 2	Pittsburgh		Kolzig	17,132	21–25–7	49	L
54	February 4	NY Islanders	1 – 2	Washington	SO	Kolzig	12,508	22–25–7	51	W
55	February 6	Boston	3 – 2	Washington	SO	Kolzig	15,273	22–25–8	52	OTL
56	February 8	Los Angeles	3 – 4	Washington	OT	Kolzig	15,527	23–25–8	54	W
57	February 10	NY Rangers	5 – 2	Washington		Kolzig	18,277	23–26–8	54	L
58	February 15	Washington	2 – 3	Tampa Bay	SO	Johnson	18,744	23–26–9	55	OTL
59	February 18	Washington	2 – 3	Pittsburgh		Johnson	17,132	23–27–9	55	L
60	February 20	Washington	3 – 5	Montreal		Johnson	21,273	23–28–9	55	L
61	February 21	San Jose	3 – 2	Washington	SO	Johnson	13,622	23–28–10	56	OTL
62	February 24	Washington	4 – 2	New Jersey		Johnson	14,301	24–28–10	58	W
63	February 25	New Jersey	3 – 2	Washington		Johnson	14,585	24–29–10	58	L
64	February 27	Florida	6 – 5	Washington	OT	Johnson	10,979	24–29–11	59	OTL

March: 2–10–3 (home: 2–3–1; road: 0–7–2)

Game	Date	Visitor	Score	Home	OT	Decision	Attendance	Record	Points	Recap
65	March 1	Tampa Bay	5 – 4	Washington	SO	Johnson	10,462	24–29–12	60	OTL
66	March 3	NY Islanders	6 – 2	Washington		Johnson	16,453	24–30–12	60	L
67	March 6	Washington	1 – 2	Toronto		Cassivi	19,531	24–31–12	60	L
68	March 9	Carolina	3 – 0	Washington		Johnson	13,970	24–32–12	60	L
69	March 10	Washington	2 – 5	NY Islanders		Johnson	15,764	24–33–12	60	L
70	March 12	Washington	2 – 4	Atlanta		Johnson	14,041	24–34–12	60	L
71	March 15	Washington	3 – 4	Boston	SO	Kolzig	15,091	24–34–13	61	OTL
72	March 16	Toronto	1 – 5	Washington		Kolzig	16,281	25–34–13	63	W
73	March 18	Tampa Bay	1 – 7	Washington		Kolzig	14,274	26–34–13	65	W
74	March 21	Washington	2 – 5	Buffalo		Kolzig	18,690	26–35–13	65	L
75	March 22	Washington	3 – 4	Carolina		Johnson	18,740	26–36–13	65	L
76	March 24	Washington	1 – 4	Montreal		Kolzig	21,273	26–37–13	65	L
77	March 27	Pittsburgh	4 – 3	Washington		Kolzig	18,277	26–38–13	65	L
78	March 30	Washington	2 – 3	Florida	OT	Johnson	15,712	26–38–14	66	OTL
79	March 31	Washington	2 – 5	Tampa Bay		Kolzig	20,064	26–39–14	66	L

April: 2–1–0 (home: 1–1–0; road: 1–0–0)

Game	Date	Visitor	Score	Home	OT	Decision	Attendance	Record	Points	Recap
80	April 3	Florida	0 – 1	Washington		Kolzig	16,311	27–39–14	68	W
81	April 4	Washington	3 – 2	Atlanta		Johnson	18,783	28–39–14	70	W
82	April 7	Buffalo	2 – 0	Washington		Kolzig	18,277	28–40–14	70	L

Legend: W Win (2 points) L Loss (0 points) OTL Overtime/shootout loss (1 point)

== Player statistics ==
=== Scoring ===
- Position abbreviations: C = Center; D = Defense; G = Goaltender; LW = Left wing; RW = Right wing
- † = Joined team via a transaction (e.g., trade, waivers, signing) during the season. Stats reflect time with the Capitals only.
- ‡ = Left team via a transaction (e.g., trade, waivers, release) during the season. Stats reflect time with the Capitals only.

No.	Player	Pos	Regular season					
No.	Player	Pos	GP	G	A	Pts	+/-	PIM
8	Alexander Ovechkin	LW	82	46	46	92	−19	52
28	Alexander Semin	LW	77	38	35	73	−7	90
17	Chris Clark	RW	74	30	24	54	−10	66
9	Dainius Zubrus‡	C	60	20	32	52	−16	50
18	Matt Pettinger	LW	64	16	16	32	−13	22
15	Boyd Gordon	C	71	7	22	29	10	14
2	Brian Pothier	D	72	3	25	28	−11	44
24	Kris Beech	C	64	8	18	26	−11	46
27	Ben Clymer	RW	66	7	13	20	−17	44
21	Brooks Laich	C	73	8	10	18	−2	29
20	Richard Zednik‡	RW	32	6	12	18	−4	16
16	Brian Sutherby	C	69	7	10	17	−9	78
44	Steve Eminger	D	68	1	16	17	−14	63
6	Jamie Heward‡	D	52	4	12	16	4	27
10	Matt Bradley	RW	57	4	9	13	−5	47
87	Donald Brashear	LW	77	4	9	13	1	156
26	Shaone Morrisonn	D	78	3	10	13	3	106
52	Mike Green	D	70	2	10	12	−10	36
38	Jakub Klepis	C	41	3	7	10	−2	28
23	Milan Jurcina†	D	30	2	7	9	5	24
43	Tomas Fleischmann	LW	29	4	4	8	−6	8
3	Lawrence Nycholat‡	D	18	2	6	8	−3	12
47	Bryan Muir	D	26	3	4	7	3	42
4	John Erskine	D	29	1	6	7	−13	69
13	Jiri Novotny†	C	18	0	6	6	−2	2
39	Alexandre Giroux	C	9	2	2	4	−4	2
14	Eric Fehr	RW	14	2	1	3	3	8
37	Olaf Kolzig	G	54	0	3	3		10
55	Jeff Schultz	D	38	0	3	3	5	16
22	Rico Fata‡	RW	10	1	1	2	3	2
1	Brent Johnson	G	30	0	1	1		4
35	Frederic Cassivi	G	4	0	0	0		0
51	Timo Helbling‡	D	2	0	0	0	−1	2
29	Jamie Hunt	D	1	0	0	0	−1	0
25	David Steckel	C	5	0	0	0	−2	2

=== Goaltending ===
No.	Player	Regular season									
No.	Player	GP	W	L	OT	SA	GA	GAA	SV%	SO	TOI
37	Olaf Kolzig	54	22	24	6	1771	159	3.00	.910	1	3184
1	Brent Johnson	30	6	15	7	894	99	3.62	.889	0	1644
35	Frederic Cassivi	4	0	1	1	58	6	2.60	.897	0	139

== Awards and records ==
=== Awards ===
Type	Award/honor	Recipient	Ref
League (annual)	NHL First All-Star Team	Alexander Ovechkin (Left wing)	
League (in-season)	NHL All-Star Game selection	Alexander Ovechkin (Note: Ovechkin was voted to the starting lineup.)	
League (in-season)	NHL Third Star of the Week	Alexander Ovechkin (December 10)	
League (in-season)	NHL YoungStars Game selection	Mike Green	

=== Milestones ===
Milestone	Player	Date	Ref
First game	Jeff Schultz	December 22, 2006	
First game	Jamie Hunt	December 29, 2006	

== Transactions ==
The Capitals were involved in the following transactions from June 20, 2006, the day after the deciding game of the 2006 Stanley Cup Finals, through June 6, 2007, the day of the deciding game of the 2007 Stanley Cup Finals.

=== Trades ===
Date	Details		Ref
June 24, 2006	To Washington Capitals: 4th-round pick in 2007	To New York Rangers: Vancouver's 5th-round pick in 2006	
July 12, 2006	To Washington Capitals: Richard Zednik	To Montreal Canadiens: 3rd-round pick in 2007	
February 1, 2007	To Washington Capitals: Milan Jurcina	To Boston Bruins: 4th-round pick in 2008	
February 26, 2007	To Washington Capitals: 2nd-round pick in 2007	To New York Islanders: Richard Zednik	
February 26, 2007	To Washington Capitals: Andy Hedlund; 6th-round pick in 2008	To Ottawa Senators: Lawrence Nycholat	
February 27, 2007	To Washington Capitals: Jiri Novotny; 1st-round pick in 2007	To Buffalo Sabres: Timo Helbling; Dainius Zubrus	
February 27, 2007	To Washington Capitals: Conditional 5th-round pick in 2008	To Los Angeles Kings: Jamie Heward	

=== Players acquired ===
Date	Player	Former team	Term	Via	Ref
July 1, 2006	Brian Pothier	Ottawa Senators	4-year	Free agency	
July 14, 2006	Donald Brashear	Philadelphia Flyers	1-year	Free agency	
July 14, 2006	Alexandre Giroux	New York Rangers		Free agency	
July 14, 2006	Chad Wiseman	New York Rangers		Free agency	
July 18, 2006	Quintin Laing	Chicago Blackhawks		Free agency	
July 21, 2006	Pete Vandermeer	Montreal Canadiens		Free agency	
July 25, 2006	Trevor Byrne	St. Louis Blues		Free agency	
July 26, 2006	Dean Arsene	Hershey Bears (AHL)	2-year	Free agency	
September 14, 2006	John Erskine	New York Islanders		Free agency	
March 16, 2007	Travis Morin	Minnesota State University, Mankato (WCHA)	2-year	Free agency	
March 16, 2007	Steve Pinizzotto	RIT (AHA)	2-year	Free agency	
March 17, 2007	Sean Collins	Ohio State University (CCHA)	2-year	Free agency	

=== Players lost ===
Date	Player	New team	Via (Note: In parentheses is the player's free agency group on July 1 if applicable.)	Ref
N/A	Petr Sykora	HC Pardubice (ELH)	Free agency (VI)	
July 1, 2006	Doug Doull (Note: Doull retired.)		Contract expiration (III)	
July 1, 2006	Nolan Yonkman	Nashville Predators (Note: Yonkman signed with Nashville on July 17.)	Buyout	
July 4, 2006	Brian Willsie	Los Angeles Kings	Free agency (UFA)	
July 5, 2006	Jeff Halpern	Dallas Stars	Free agency (III)	
July 13, 2006	Boyd Kane	Philadelphia Flyers	Free agency (VI)	
July 14, 2006	Graham Mink	San Jose Sharks	Free agency (VI)	
July 27, 2006	Mark Wotton	New York Islanders	Free agency (III)	
August 9, 2006	Mathieu Biron	San Jose Sharks	Free agency (UFA)	
August 10, 2006	Colin Forbes	Adler Mannheim (DEL)	Free agency (III)	
August 22, 2006	Jakub Cutta	HC Bili Tygri Liberec (ELH)	Free agency (II) (Note: Washington retained Cutta's NHL rights through the 2008–09 season.)	
August 29, 2006	Jean-Francois Fortin	Fuchse Duisburg (DEL)	Free agency (VI)	
September 13, 2006	Owen Fussey	Toronto Marlies (AHL)	Free agency (UFA)	
September 14, 2006	Ivan Majesky	Oulun Karpat (Liiga)	Free agency (III)	
October 7, 2006	Jared Aulin	Springfield Falcons (AHL)	Free agency (UFA)	
November 8, 2006	Rico Fata	Adler Mannheim (DEL)	Free agency	

=== Signings ===
Date	Player	Term	Contract type	Ref
July 1, 2006	Brent Johnson		Re-signing	
July 6, 2006	Sasha Pokulok		Entry-level	
July 10, 2006	Shaone Morrisonn	2-year	Re-signing	
July 13, 2006	Frederic Cassivi		Re-signing	
July 13, 2006	Brooks Laich		Re-signing	
July 15, 2006	Kris Beech		Re-signing	
July 15, 2006	Steve Eminger		Re-signing	
July 15, 2006	Boyd Gordon	2-year	Re-signing	
July 17, 2006	Rico Fata	1-year	Re-signing	
July 17, 2006	Brian Sutherby	1-year	Re-signing	
July 21, 2006	Ben Clymer	3-year	Re-signing	
July 26, 2006	Matt Bradley	2-year	Re-signing	
July 31, 2006	Matt Pettinger	3-year	Re-signing	
December 20, 2006	Viktor Dovgan	3-year	Entry-level	
January 12, 2007	Brent Johnson	2-year	Extension	
February 12, 2007	Donald Brashear	1-year	Extension	
March 28, 2007	Andrew Joudrey	2-year	Entry-level	
April 3, 2007	Andrew Gordon	3-year	Entry-level	
May 4, 2007	Patrick McNeill	3-year	Entry-level	
May 31, 2007	Sami Lepisto	2-year	Entry-level	
June 1, 2007	Michal Neuvirth	3-year	Entry-level	

== Draft picks ==
Washington's picks at the 2006 NHL entry draft in Vancouver, British Columbia.

Round	#	Player	Nationality	NHL team	College/junior/club team (league)
1	4	Nicklas Backstrom (C)	Sweden	Washington Capitals	Brynas IF (Elitserien)
1	23	Semyon Varlamov (G)	Russia	Washington Capitals (from Nashville)	Lokomotiv Yaroslavl (Russian Superleague)
2	34	Michal Neuvirth (G)	Czech Republic	Washington Capitals	Sparta Praha (Czech Extraliga)
2	35	Francois Bouchard (RW)	Canada	Washington Capitals (from Boston)	Baie-Comeau Drakkar (QMJHL)
2	52	Keith Seabrook (D)	Canada	Washington Capitals (from Anaheim)	Burnaby Express (BCHL)
4	97	Oskar Osala (LW)	Finland	Washington Capitals	Mississauga IceDogs (OHL)
4	122	Luke Lynes (C/LW)	United States	Washington Capitals (from Detroit)	Brampton Battalion (OHL)
5	127	Maxime Lacroix (LW)	Canada	Washington Capitals	Quebec Remparts (QMJHL)
6	157	Brent Gwidt (C)	United States	Washington Capitals	Lakeland (USHS-WI)
6	177	Mathieu Perreault (C)	Canada	Washington Capitals (from Buffalo)	Acadie-Bathurst Titan (QMJHL)

== See also ==
- 2006–07 NHL season
