= 2006–07 Pittsburgh Penguins season =

NHL team season

2006–07 Pittsburgh Penguins
- Division: 2nd Atlantic
- Conference: 5th Eastern
- 2006–07 record: 47–24–11
- Home record: 26–10–5
- Road record: 21–14–6
- Goals for: 277
- Goals against: 246

Team information
- General manager: Ray Shero
- Coach: Michel Therrien
- Captain: Vacant
- Alternate captains: Sidney Crosby; Sergei Gonchar; John LeClair (Oct.–Dec.); Mark Recchi
- Arena: Mellon Arena
- Minor league affiliates: Wilkes-Barre/Scranton Penguins; Wheeling Nailers

Team leaders
- Goals: Sidney Crosby (36)
- Assists: Sidney Crosby (84)
- Points: Sidney Crosby (120)
- Penalty minutes: Jarkko Ruutu (125)
- Plus/minus: Jordan Staal (+6)
- Wins: Marc-Andre Fleury (40)
- Goals against average: Jocelyn Thibault (2.83); Marc-Andre Fleury

The Pittsburgh Penguins 2006–07 season was rife with potential, as the team featured one of the largest groups of young stars in the National Hockey League (NHL). Evgeni Malkin, the second overall pick in the 2004 NHL entry draft, came to the United States from Russia prior to the season and joined the team. He promptly became the first NHL rookie since 1917 to score goals in each of his first six games. Malkin and second-year phenom Sidney Crosby were joined by 18-year-old Jordan Staal, who made the jump directly from the Ontario Hockey League (OHL) to the Penguins roster after being drafted second overall in the 2006 NHL entry draft. The Penguins also brought back Mark Recchi via free agency, giving Recchi his third stint with the team. It would also be the first season the team would have involving defenceman and soon-to-be alternate captain Kris Letang. This season began with the team's fourth head coach in six seasons.

The season was clouded with uncertainty, however, about the Penguins' future in Pittsburgh. After Jim Balsillie had agreed to purchase the franchise for $175 million and to keep it in Pittsburgh, the situation seemed settled. Balsillie's deal fell through, however, in December. Isle of Capri Casinos was next to make a bid to keep the team in Pittsburgh, but their deal was nixed as well. On January 3, 2007, Penguins officials, including Mario Lemieux and other members of the team's ownership group, visited Kansas City, Missouri, to discuss potentials of relocating the team there. Other cities which reportedly have expressed interest in the franchise include Houston, Winnipeg, Portland and Oklahoma City.

On March 14, 2007, in a joint announcement by Pennsylvania Governor Ed Rendell, Allegheny County Executive Dan Onorato, Pittsburgh Mayor Luke Ravenstahl and Mario Lemieux, it was made public that an agreement had been reached between the parties. A new state-of-the-art multi-purpose arena (the Consol Energy Center) will be built. This agreement will keep the Penguins in Pittsburgh for another 30 years. Following the announcement of this plan, the Lemieux ownership group announced that they no longer have plans to sell the team.

On January 9, 2007, the NHL announced that Sidney Crosby had been voted by the fans to start at forward in the 2007 All-Star Game in Dallas, Texas. Malkin, Staal and defenseman Ryan Whitney were all invited to All-Star Weekend to play in the YoungStars game.

The rebuilding of the team that came with acquiring Sidney Crosby would come to fruition in his second year. This season began a playoff streak for the Penguins that would not be snapped until the 2023 season.

== Regular season ==
The Penguins finished the regular season having scored 94 power-play goals, the most in the NHL. They also had the most power-play opportunities, with 463.

=== Season standings ===
Atlantic Division
No.	CR		GP	W	L	OTL	GF	GA	Pts
1	2	**New Jersey Devils**	82	49	24	9	216	201	107
2	5	**Pittsburgh Penguins**	82	47	24	11	277	246	105
3	6	**New York Rangers**	82	42	30	10	242	216	94
4	8	**New York Islanders**	82	40	30	12	248	240	92
5	15	Philadelphia Flyers	82	22	48	12	214	303	56

Note: No. = Division rank, CR = Conference rank, W = Wins, L = Losses, T = Ties, GF = Goals For, GA = Goals Against, Pts = Points
Teams that qualified for the playoffs are highlighted in bold.

Eastern Conference
R		Div	GP	W	L	OTL	GF	GA	Pts
**1**	**P -** Buffalo Sabres	**NE**	**82**	**53**	**22**	**7**	**308**	**242**	113
**2**	**Y -** New Jersey Devils	**AT**	**82**	**49**	**24**	**9**	**216**	**201**	107
**3**	**Y -** Atlanta Thrashers	**SE**	**82**	**43**	**28**	**11**	**246**	**245**	97
**4**	**X -** Ottawa Senators	**NE**	**82**	**48**	**25**	**9**	**288**	**222**	105
**5**	**X -** Pittsburgh Penguins	**AT**	**82**	**47**	**24**	**11**	**277**	**246**	105
**6**	**X -** New York Rangers	**AT**	**82**	**42**	**30**	**10**	**242**	**216**	94
**7**	**X -** Tampa Bay Lightning	**SE**	**82**	**44**	**33**	**5**	**253**	**261**	93
**8**	**X -** New York Islanders	**AT**	**82**	**40**	**30**	**12**	**248**	**240**	92
8.5
9	Toronto Maple Leafs	NE	82	40	31	11	258	269	91
10	Montreal Canadiens	NE	82	42	34	6	245	256	90
11	Carolina Hurricanes	SE	82	40	34	8	241	253	88
12	Florida Panthers	SE	82	35	31	16	247	257	86
13	Boston Bruins	NE	82	35	41	6	219	289	76
14	Washington Capitals	SE	82	28	40	14	235	286	70
15	Philadelphia Flyers	AT	82	22	48	12	214	303	56

Divisions: AT – Atlantic, NE – Northeast, SE – Southeast

P – Clinched Presidents Trophy; Y – Clinched division; X – Clinched playoff spot

== Playoffs ==
The Pittsburgh Penguins ended the 2006–07 regular season as the Eastern Conference's fifth seed. They lost to the Ottawa Senators in five games, in the conference quarterfinals. They would sweep the Senators in the playoffs the following season.

== Schedule and results ==
=== Regular season ===
2006–07 regular season
October: 6–3–0 (home: 3–3–0; road: 3–0–0), 12 points

#	Oct	Visitor	Score	Home	Location	Record	Points	Recap
1	5	Philadelphia Flyers	0–4	Pittsburgh Penguins	Civic Arena (16,957)	1–0–0	2	W
2	7	Detroit Red Wings	2–0	Pittsburgh Penguins	Civic Arena (15,318)	1–1–0	2	L
3	12	Pittsburgh Penguins	6–5	New York Rangers	Madison Square Garden (IV) (18,200)	2–1–0	4	W
4	14	Carolina Hurricanes	5–1	Pittsburgh Penguins	Civic Arena (14,351)	2–2–0	4	L
5	18	New Jersey Devils	2–1	Pittsburgh Penguins	Civic Arena (17,030)	2–3–0	4	L
6	19	Pittsburgh Penguins	4–3 OT	New York Islanders	Nassau Veterans Memorial Coliseum (10,258)	3–3–0	6	W
7	21	Columbus Blue Jackets	3–5	Pittsburgh Penguins	Civic Arena (14,637)	4–3–0	8	W
8	24	New Jersey Devils	2–4	Pittsburgh Penguins	Civic Arena (13,190)	5–3–0	10	W
9	28	Pittsburgh Penguins	8–2	Philadelphia Flyers	Wells Fargo Center (19,589)	6–3–0	12	W

November: 5–5–4 (home: 3–1–3; road: 2–4–1), 14 points

#	Nov	Visitor	Score	Home	Location	Record	Points	Recap
10	1	Pittsburgh Penguins	4–3 OT	Los Angeles Kings	Staples Center (18,118)	7–3–0	14	W
11	4	Pittsburgh Penguins	2–3	San Jose Sharks	SAP Center at San Jose (17,496)	7–4–0	14	L
12	6	Pittsburgh Penguins	2–3 OT	Anaheim Ducks	Honda Center (16,599)	7–4–1	15	OTL
13	8	Tampa Bay Lightning	4–3 OT	Pittsburgh Penguins	Civic Arena (14,483)	7–4–2	16	OTL
14	10	Ottawa Senators	6–3	Pittsburgh Penguins	Civic Arena (17,052)	7–5–2	16	L
15	11	Pittsburgh Penguins	2–6	Carolina Hurricanes	PNC Arena (18,726)	7–6–2	16	L
16	13	Philadelphia Flyers	2–3	Pittsburgh Penguins	Civic Arena (13,781)	8–6–2	18	W
17	17	Pittsburgh Penguins	2–4	Buffalo Sabres	First Niagara Center (18,690)	8–7–2	18	L
18	18	New York Rangers	1–3	Pittsburgh Penguins	Civic Arena (16,737)	9–7–2	20	W
19	20	Pittsburgh Penguins	5–3	Philadelphia Flyers	Wells Fargo Center (19,349)	10–7–2	22	W
20	22	Boston Bruins	4–3 SO	Pittsburgh Penguins	Civic Arena (16,958)	10–7–3	23	OTL
21	24	Pittsburgh Penguins	1–3	New York Islanders	Nassau Veterans Memorial Coliseum (15,625)	10–8–3	23	L
22	25	New York Rangers	2–1 OT	Pittsburgh Penguins	Civic Arena (17,134)	10–8–4	24	OTL
23	28	New York Islanders	2–3	Pittsburgh Penguins	Civic Arena (17,082)	11–8–4	26	W

December: 5–7–2 (home: 3–4–0; road: 2–3–2), 12 points

#	Dec	Visitor	Score	Home	Location	Record	Points	Recap
24	1	Pittsburgh Penguins	2–5	New Jersey Devils	Izod Center (13,890)	11–9–4	26	L
25	2	New York Islanders	5–3	Pittsburgh Penguins	Civic Arena (17,025)	11–10–4	26	L
26	5	Florida Panthers	3–2	Pittsburgh Penguins	Civic Arena (12,511)	11–11–4	26	L
27	7	Pittsburgh Penguins	2–3 SO	New York Rangers	Madison Square Garden (IV) (18,200)	11–11–5	27	OTL
28	9	Pittsburgh Penguins	4–3 OT	Atlanta Thrashers	Philips Arena (18,687)	12–11–5	29	W
29	11	Pittsburgh Penguins	5–4 SO	Washington Capitals	Verizon Center (14,793)	13–11–5	31	W
30	13	Philadelphia Flyers	4–8	Pittsburgh Penguins	Civic Arena (14,150)	14–11–5	33	W
31	15	New York Islanders	4–7	Pittsburgh Penguins	Civic Arena (17,028)	15–11–5	35	W
32	16	Pittsburgh Penguins	3–6	Montreal Canadiens	Bell Centre (21,273)	15–12–5	35	L
33	19	St. Louis Blues	4–1	Pittsburgh Penguins	Civic Arena (17,017)	15–13–5	35	L
34	21	Pittsburgh Penguins	3–4 SO	Atlanta Thrashers	Philips Arena (17,328)	15–13–6	36	OTL
35	26	Pittsburgh Penguins	0–3	New Jersey Devils	Izod Center (16,156)	15–14–6	36	L
36	27	Atlanta Thrashers	4–2	Pittsburgh Penguins	Civic Arena (17,132)	15–15–6	36	L
37	29	Toronto Maple Leafs	1–4	Pittsburgh Penguins	Civic Arena (17,132)	16–15–6	38	W

January: 8–2–2 (home: 4–0–1; road: 4–2–1), 18 points

#	Jan	Visitor	Score	Home	Location	Record	Points	Recap
38	2	Carolina Hurricanes	0–3	Pittsburgh Penguins	Civic Arena (16,957)	17–15–6	40	W
39	5	Pittsburgh Penguins	4–2	Buffalo Sabres	First Niagara Center (18,690)	18–15–6	42	W
40	7	Tampa Bay Lightning	3–2 SO	Pittsburgh Penguins	Civic Arena (17,132)	18–15–7	43	OTL
41	9	Pittsburgh Penguins	2–3	Tampa Bay Lightning	Amalie Arena (19,226)	18–16–7	43	L
42	10	Pittsburgh Penguins	2–5	Florida Panthers	BB&T Center (16,098)	18–17–7	43	L
43	13	Pittsburgh Penguins	5–3	Philadelphia Flyers	Wells Fargo Center (19,587)	19–17–7	45	W
44	16	New York Islanders	2–5	Pittsburgh Penguins	Civic Arena (16,958)	20–17–7	47	W
45	18	Pittsburgh Penguins	4–5 SO	Boston Bruins	TD Garden (16,468)	20–17–8	48	OTL
46	20	Toronto Maple Leafs	2–8	Pittsburgh Penguins	Civic Arena (17,132)	21–17–8	50	W
47	26	Pittsburgh Penguins	4–3 SO	Dallas Stars	American Airlines Center (18,594)	22–17–8	52	W
48	27	Pittsburgh Penguins	7–2	Phoenix Coyotes	America West Arena (18,495)	23–17–8	54	W
49	30	Florida Panthers	0–3	Pittsburgh Penguins	Civic Arena (15,405)	24–17–8	56	W

February: 9–3–1 (home: 5–1–0; road: 4–2–1), 19 points

#	Feb	Visitor	Score	Home	Location	Record	Points	Recap
50	1	Montreal Canadiens	4–5 SO	Pittsburgh Penguins	Civic Arena (17,132)	25–17–8	58	W
51	3	Washington Capitals	0–2	Pittsburgh Penguins	Civic Arena (17,132)	26–17–8	60	W
52	4	Pittsburgh Penguins	3–4 OT	Montreal Canadiens	Bell Centre (21,273)	26–17–9	61	OTL
53	6	Nashville Predators	1–4	Pittsburgh Penguins	Civic Arena (16,333)	27–17–9	63	W
54	8	Pittsburgh Penguins	5–4 SO	Philadelphia Flyers	Wells Fargo Center (19,512)	28–17–9	65	W
55	10	Pittsburgh Penguins	6–5 OT	Toronto Maple Leafs	Air Canada Centre (19,620)	29–17–9	67	W
56	14	Chicago Blackhawks	4–5 SO	Pittsburgh Penguins	Civic Arena (17,051)	30–17–9	69	W
57	16	Pittsburgh Penguins	5–4	New Jersey Devils	Izod Center (15,404)	31–17–9	71	W
58	18	Washington Capitals	2–3	Pittsburgh Penguins	Civic Arena (17,132)	32–17–9	73	W
59	19	Pittsburgh Penguins	5–6	New York Islanders	Nassau Veterans Memorial Coliseum (15,472)	32–18–9	73	L
60	22	Pittsburgh Penguins	2–1 OT	Florida Panthers	BB&T Center (17,102)	33–18–9	75	W
61	25	Pittsburgh Penguins	1–5	Tampa Bay Lightning	Amalie Arena (21,119)	33–19–9	75	L
62	27	New Jersey Devils	1–0	Pittsburgh Penguins	Civic Arena (17,006)	33–20–9	75	L

March: 12–3–2 (home: 7–0–1; road: 5–3–1), 26 points

#	Mar	Visitor	Score	Home	Location	Record	Points	Recap
63	1	Pittsburgh Penguins	4–3 SO	New York Rangers	Madison Square Garden (IV) (18,200)	34–20–9	77	W
64	2	Pittsburgh Penguins	2–3	Carolina Hurricanes	PNC Arena (18,793)	34–21–9	77	L
65	4	Philadelphia Flyers	3–4 SO	Pittsburgh Penguins	Civic Arena (17,132)	35–21–9	79	W
66	6	Pittsburgh Penguins	5–4 SO	Ottawa Senators	Canadian Tire Centre (20,074)	36–21–9	81	W
67	8	New Jersey Devils	4–3 SO	Pittsburgh Penguins	Civic Arena (17,132)	36–21–10	82	OTL
68	10	New York Rangers	2–3 OT	Pittsburgh Penguins	Civic Arena (17,132)	37–21–10	84	W
69	13	Buffalo Sabres	4–5 SO	Pittsburgh Penguins	Civic Arena (17,132)	38–21–10	86	W
70	14	Pittsburgh Penguins	3–0	New Jersey Devils	Izod Center (14,862)	39–21–10	88	W
71	16	Montreal Canadiens	3–6	Pittsburgh Penguins	Civic Arena (17,132)	40–21–10	90	W
72	18	Ottawa Senators	3–4 SO	Pittsburgh Penguins	Civic Arena (17,132)	41–21–10	92	W
73	19	Pittsburgh Penguins	1–2	New York Rangers	Madison Square Garden (IV) (18,200)	41–22–10	92	L
74	22	Pittsburgh Penguins	1–3	New York Islanders	Nassau Veterans Memorial Coliseum (14,574)	41–23–10	92	L
75	24	Atlanta Thrashers	1–2	Pittsburgh Penguins	Civic Arena (17,132)	42–23–10	94	W
76	25	Boston Bruins	0–5	Pittsburgh Penguins	Civic Arena (17,132)	43–23–10	96	W
77	27	Pittsburgh Penguins	4–3	Washington Capitals	Verizon Center (18,277)	44–23–10	98	W
78	29	Pittsburgh Penguins	4–2	Boston Bruins	TD Garden (17,095)	45–23–10	100	W
79	31	Pittsburgh Penguins	4–5 OT	Toronto Maple Leafs	Air Canada Centre (19,649)	45–23–11	101	OTL

April: 2–1–0 (home: 1–1–0; road: 1–0–0), 4 points

#	Apr	Visitor	Score	Home	Location	Record	Points	Recap
80	3	Buffalo Sabres	4–1	Pittsburgh Penguins	Civic Arena (17,132)	45–24–11	101	L
81	5	Pittsburgh Penguins	3–2	Ottawa Senators	Canadian Tire Centre (20,064)	46–24–11	103	W
82	7	New York Rangers	1–2	Pittsburgh Penguins	Civic Arena (17,132)	47–24–11	105	W

Legend: W Win (2 points) L Loss (0 points) OTL Overtime/shootout loss (1 point)

=== Playoffs ===
2007 Stanley Cup playoffs
Eastern Conference Quarterfinals vs #4 Ottawa: 1–4 (home: 0–2; road: 1–2)

#	Date	Visitor	Score	Home	Decision	Attendance	Series	Recap
1	April 11	Pittsburgh	3 – 6	Ottawa	Fleury	19,611	0–1	L
2	April 14	Pittsburgh	4 – 3	Ottawa	Fleury	20,133	1–1	W
3	April 15	Ottawa	4 – 2	Pittsburgh	Fleury	17,132	1–2	L
4	April 17	Ottawa	2 – 1	Pittsburgh	Fleury	17,132	1–3	L
5	April 19	Pittsburgh	0 – 3	Ottawa	Fleury	20,179	1–4	L

Legend: W Win L Loss

== Player statistics ==
Skaters

Regular season
Player	GP	G	A	Pts	+/−	PIM
Sidney Crosby	79	36	84	120	10	60
Evgeni Malkin	78	33	52	85	2	80
Mark Recchi	82	24	44	68	1	62
Sergei Gonchar	82	13	54	67	-5	72
Ryan Whitney	81	14	45	59	9	77
Michel Ouellet	73	19	29	48	-3	30
Jordan Staal	81	29	13	42	16	24
Colby Armstrong	80	12	22	34	2	67
Erik Christensen	61	18	15	33	-3	26
Ryan Malone	64	16	15	31	4	71
Maxime Talbot	75	13	11	24	-2	53
Jarkko Ruutu	81	7	9	16	0	125
Nils Ekman	34	6	9	15	-14	24
Dominic Moore^{‡}	59	6	9	15	1	46
Gary Roberts^{†}	19	7	6	13	-5	26
Josef Melichar	70	1	11	12	1	44
Rob Scuderi	78	1	10	11	3	28
John LeClair	21	2	5	7	-2	12
Ronald Petrovicky	31	3	3	6	4	28
Brooks Orpik	70	0	6	6	4	82
Chris Thorburn	39	3	2	5	1	69
Alain Nasreddine	44	1	4	5	12	18
Mark Eaton	35	0	3	3	-6	16
Kris Letang	7	2	0	2	-3	4
Noah Welch^{‡}	22	1	1	2	1	22
Georges Laraque^{†}	17	0	2	2	-3	18
Micki Dupont	3	0	1	1	-3	4
Eric Cairns	1	0	0	0	0	5
Andre Roy	5	0	0	0	-1	12
Joel Kwiatkowski	1	0	0	0	-1	0
Karl Stewart	3	0	0	0	-1	2
Total		267	465	732	—	1,207

Playoffs
Player	GP	G	A	Pts	+/−	PIM
Sidney Crosby	5	3	2	5	0	4
Gary Roberts	5	2	2	4	0	2
Sergei Gonchar	5	1	3	4	-3	2
Mark Recchi	5	0	4	4	-3	0
Evgeni Malkin	5	0	4	4	-1	8
Jordan Staal	5	3	0	3	-1	2
Ryan Whitney	5	1	1	2	-4	6
Michel Ouellet	5	0	2	2	-1	6
Colby Armstrong	5	0	1	1	-2	11
Maxime Talbot	5	0	1	1	-2	7
Nils Ekman	1	0	0	0	0	0
Georges Laraque	2	0	0	0	-1	0
Ronald Petrovicky	3	0	0	0	0	2
Josef Melichar	5	0	0	0	-1	2
Jarkko Ruutu	5	0	0	0	-1	10
Rob Scuderi	5	0	0	0	-1	2
Mark Eaton	5	0	0	0	-1	0
Ryan Malone	5	0	0	0	-4	0
Brooks Orpik	5	0	0	0	-2	8
Erik Christensen	4	0	0	0	-1	6
Total		10	20	30	—	78

Goaltenders

Regular season
Player	GP	GS	TOI	W	L	OT	GA	GAA	SA	SV%	SO	G	A	PIM
Marc-Andre Fleury	67	65	3905:28	40	16	9	184	2.83	1954	0.906	5	0	3	4
Jocelyn Thibault	22	17	1101:15	7	8	2	52	2.83	572	0.909	1	0	0	0
Total		82	5006:43	47	24	11	236	2.83	2526	0.907	6	0	3	4

Playoffs
Player	GP	GS	TOI	W	L	OT	GA	GAA	SA	SV%	SO	G	A	PIM
Marc-Andre Fleury	5	5	286:42	1	4	--	18	3.77	150	0.880	0	0	0	0
Jocelyn Thibault	1	0	08:02	0	0	--	0	0.00	1	1.000	0	0	0	0
Total		5	294:44	1	4	0	18	3.67	151	0.881	0	0	0	0

^{†}Denotes player spent time with another team before joining the Penguins. Stats reflect time with the Penguins only.
^{‡}Denotes player was traded mid-season. Stats reflect time with the Penguins only.

== Awards and records ==
=== Awards ===
Type	Award/honor	Recipient	Ref
League (annual)	Art Ross Trophy	Sidney Crosby	
League (annual)	Calder Memorial Trophy	Evgeni Malkin	
League (annual)	Hart Memorial Trophy	Sidney Crosby	
League (annual)	Lester B. Pearson Award	Sidney Crosby	
League (annual)	NHL All-Rookie Team	Evgeni Malkin (Forward)	
League (annual)	NHL All-Rookie Team	Jordan Staal (Forward)	
League (annual)	NHL First All-Star Team	Sidney Crosby (Center)	
League (in-season)	NHL All-Star Game selection	Sidney Crosby (Note: Crosby was voted to the starting lineup, earning more votes than any other player.)	
League (in-season)	NHL First Star of the Week	Sidney Crosby (December 17)	
League (in-season)	NHL First Star of the Week	Mark Recchi (January 28)	
League (in-season)	NHL Rookie of the Month	Evgeni Malkin (October)	
League (in-season)	NHL Rookie of the Month	Evgeni Malkin (November)	
League (in-season)	NHL Second Star of the Month	Sidney Crosby (January)	
League (in-season)	NHL Third Star of the Month	Sidney Crosby (December)	
League (in-season)	NHL Third Star of the Week	Evgeni Malkin (October 29)	
League (in-season)	NHL Third Star of the Week	Evgeni Malkin (January 21)	
League (in-season)	NHL YoungStars Game selection	Evgeni Malkin	
League (in-season)	NHL YoungStars Game selection	Jordan Staal	
League (in-season)	NHL YoungStars Game selection	Ryan Whitney	
Team	A. T. Caggiano Memorial Booster Club Award	Sidney Crosby	
Team	Aldege "Baz" Bastien Memorial Good Guy Award	Pittsburgh Penguins team	
Team	Michel Briere Memorial Rookie of the Year Trophy	Evgeni Malkin	
Team	Michel Briere Memorial Rookie of the Year Trophy	Jordan Staal	
Team	Most Valuable Player Award	Sidney Crosby	
Team	Players' Player Award	Mark Recchi	
Team	The Edward J. DeBartolo Community Service Award	Mark Recchi	

=== Milestones ===
Milestone	Player	Date	Ref
First game	Kris Letang	October 5, 2006	
First game	Jordan Staal	October 5, 2006	
First game	Evgeni Malkin	October 18, 2006	

== Transactions ==
The Penguins were involved in the following transactions from June 20, 2006, the day after the deciding game of the 2006 Stanley Cup Finals, through June 6, 2007, the day of the deciding game of the 2007 Stanley Cup Finals.

=== Trades ===
Date	Details		Ref
June 24, 2006	To Florida Panthers: Nashville's 4th-round pick in 2006	To Pittsburgh Penguins: 4th-round pick in 2007	
July 19, 2006	To Nashville Predators: 3rd-round pick in 2007	To Pittsburgh Penguins: Dominic Moore; Libor Pivko	
July 20, 2006	To San Jose Sharks: Carolina's 2nd-round pick in 2007	To Pittsburgh Penguins: Patrick Ehelechner; Nils Ekman	
December 19, 2006	To Boston Bruins: Future considerations	To Pittsburgh Penguins: Wade Brookbank	
February 27, 2007	To Florida Panthers: Noah Welch	To Pittsburgh Penguins: Gary Roberts	
February 27, 2007	To Minnesota Wild: Dominic Moore	To Pittsburgh Penguins: 3rd-round pick in 2007	
February 27, 2007	To Phoenix Coyotes: Daniel Carcillo; 3rd-round pick in 2008	To Pittsburgh Penguins: Georges Laraque	
February 27, 2007	To Florida Panthers: Florida's 4th-round pick in 2007	To Pittsburgh Penguins: Joel Kwiatkowski	
February 27, 2007	To San Jose Sharks: 7th-round pick in 2007	To Pittsburgh Penguins: Nolan Schaefer	

=== Players acquired ===
Date	Player	Former team	Term	Via	Ref
July 3, 2006	Mark Eaton	Nashville Predators	2-year	Free agency	
July 4, 2006	Jarkko Ruutu	Vancouver Canucks		Free agency	
July 21, 2006	Wade Skolney	Philadelphia Flyers		Free agency	
July 23, 2006	Matt Carkner	San Jose Sharks	1-year	Free agency	
July 24, 2006	Ronald Petrovicky	Atlanta Thrashers		Free agency	
July 25, 2006	Mark Recchi	Carolina Hurricanes	1-year	Free agency	
August 9, 2006	Connor James	Los Angeles Kings		Free agency	
August 18, 2006	Andrew Penner	Columbus Blue Jackets		Free agency	
September 27, 2006	Karl Stewart	Anaheim Ducks		Waivers	
October 3, 2006	Chris Thorburn	Buffalo Sabres		Waivers	
March 22, 2007	Mark Letestu	Western Michigan University (CCHA)	2-year	Free agency	
April 23, 2007	Aaron Boogaard	Tri-City Americans (WHL)	3-year	Free agency	
May 25, 2007	Jonathan D'Aversa	Sudbury Wolves (OHL)	3-year	Free agency	
May 29, 2007	Tim Wallace	Wilkes-Barre/Scranton Penguins (AHL)	2-year	Free agency	

=== Players lost ===
Date	Player	New team	Via (Note: In parentheses is the player's free agency group on July 1 if applicable.)	Ref
June 24, 2006	Sebastien Caron	Chicago Blackhawks (Note: Caron signed with Chicago on August 8.)	Buyout	
June 24, 2006	Shane Endicott	Nashville Predators (Note: Endicott signed with Nashville on July 17.)	Buyout	
July 1, 2006	Ben Eaves (Note: Eaves was inactive during the 2006–07 season.)		Contract expiration (UFA)	
July 1, 2006	Lyle Odelein (Note: Odelein retired.)		Contract expiration (III)	
July 1, 2006	Andy Schneider (Note: Schneider was inactive during the 2006–07 season.)		Contract expiration (UFA)	
July 4, 2006	Andy Hilbert	New York Islanders	Free agency (UFA)	
July 12, 2006	Matt Murley	Colorado Avalanche	Free agency (VI)	
July 13, 2006	Matt Hussey	Detroit Red Wings	Free agency (VI)	
July 15, 2006	Krys Kolanos	Detroit Red Wings	Free agency (UFA)	
July 17, 2006	David Koci	Chicago Blackhawks	Free agency (VI)	
July 24, 2006	Andy Chiodo	Oulun Karpat (Liiga)	Free agency (UFA)	
August 9, 2006	Petr Taticek	Hershey Bears (AHL)	Free agency (UFA)	
August 16, 2006	Tomas Surovy	Lulea HF (SHL)	Free agency (UFA)	
August 17, 2006	Konstantin Koltsov	Salavat Yulaev Ufa (RSL)	Free agency (UFA)	
August 22, 2006	Eric Boguniecki	Columbus Blue Jackets	Free agency (III)	
September 2006	Alexandre Rouleau	San Antonio Rampage (AHL)	Free agency (UFA)	
September 26, 2006	Ryan Vandenbussche	Jokerit (Liiga)	Free agency (III)	
October 3, 2006	Guillaume Lefebvre	Saint–Jean Chiefs (LNAH)	Free agency (VI)	
October 4, 2006	Dany Sabourin	Vancouver Canucks	Waivers	
October 2006	Drew Fata	Bridgeport Sound Tigers (AHL)	Free agency (UFA)	
October 2006	Cam Paddock	Phoenix Roadrunners (ECHL)	Free agency (UFA)	
October 26, 2006	Karl Stewart	Chicago Blackhawks	Waivers	
December 2, 2006	Andre Roy	Tampa Bay Lightning	Waivers	
December 14, 2006	John LeClair		Release	

=== Signings ===
Date	Player	Term	Contract type	Ref
July 19, 2006	Joe Jensen		Entry-level	
July 21, 2006	Colby Armstrong	1-year	Re-signing	
July 23, 2006	Brooks Orpik	2-year	Re-signing	
July 28, 2006	Ryan Malone	2-year	Arbitration award	
August 1, 2006	Dominic Moore	2-year	Re-signing	
August 2, 2006	Alain Nasreddine	1-year	Re-signing	
August 2, 2006	Libor Pivko	1-year	Re-signing	
August 5, 2006	Marc-Andre Fleury	2-year	Re-signing	
September 5, 2006	Evgeni Malkin	3-year	Entry-level	
October 2, 2006	Kris Letang	3-year	Entry-level	
October 2, 2006	Jordan Staal	3-year	Entry-level	

=== Other ===
Player	Date	Details
Andre Savard	July 3, 2006	Hired as assistant coach
Chuck Fletcher	July 14, 2006	Hired as assistant GM
Eddie Johnston	July 14, 2006	Hired as senior adviser of hockey operations
Gilles Meloche	July 26, 2006	Hired as goaltending coach
Bill O'Flaherty	August 24, 2006	Hired as pro scout
Chris Stewart	August 24, 2006	Hired as athletic trainer
Dan MacKinnon	August 24, 2006	Hired as pro scout
Jay Heinbuck	August 24, 2006	Hired as director of amateur scouting
Jim Madigan	August 24, 2006	Hired as amateur scout
Patrik Allvin	August 24, 2006	Hired as European scout
Scott Adams	August 24, 2006	Hired as assistant athletic trainer
Travis Ramsay	August 24, 2006	Hired as video coordinator
Jim Balsillie	October 5, 2006	Signed a purchase agreement to buy the team
David Morehouse	April 4, 2007	Hired as president
Ron Porter	June 4, 2007	Hired as senior consultant

== Draft picks ==
Pittsburgh's picks at the 2006 NHL entry draft in Vancouver. The Penguins had the second overall draft pick, making the fourth consecutive draft the team had a pick in the top two: they had the first overall pick in the 2003 NHL entry draft (Marc-Andre Fleury), the second overall pick in the 2004 NHL entry draft (Evgeni Malkin) and the first overall pick in the 2005 NHL entry draft (Sidney Crosby).

Round	#	Player	Pos	Nationality	College/Junior/Club team (League)
1	2	Jordan Staal	Center	Canada	Peterborough Petes (OHL)
2	32	Carl Sneep	Defence	United States	Brainerd High School (USHS-MN)
3	65	Brian Strait	Defence	United States	U.S. National Team Development Program (NAHL)
5	125	Chad Johnson	Goaltender	Canada	University of Alaska Fairbanks (WCHA)
7	185	Timo Seppanen	Defence	Finland	HIFK (SM-liiga)

Draft notes

- The Pittsburgh Penguins' fourth-round pick went to the Chicago Blackhawks as the result of an August 10, 2005 trade that sent Jocelyn Thibault to the Penguins in exchange for this pick.
- The Pittsburgh Penguins' sixth-round pick went to the Florida Panthers as the result of a January 18, 2006 trade that sent Eric Cairns to the Penguins in exchange for this pick.

== Farm teams ==
=== Wilkes-Barre/Scranton Penguins ===
The Wilkes-Barre/Scranton Penguins are Pittsburgh's top affiliate in the AHL for the 2006–07 season.

=== Wheeling Nailers ===
The Wheeling Nailers are Pittsburgh's ECHL affiliate for the 2006–07 season.

== See also ==
- 2006–07 NHL season
