= Jordan Hendry =

Canadian ice hockey player

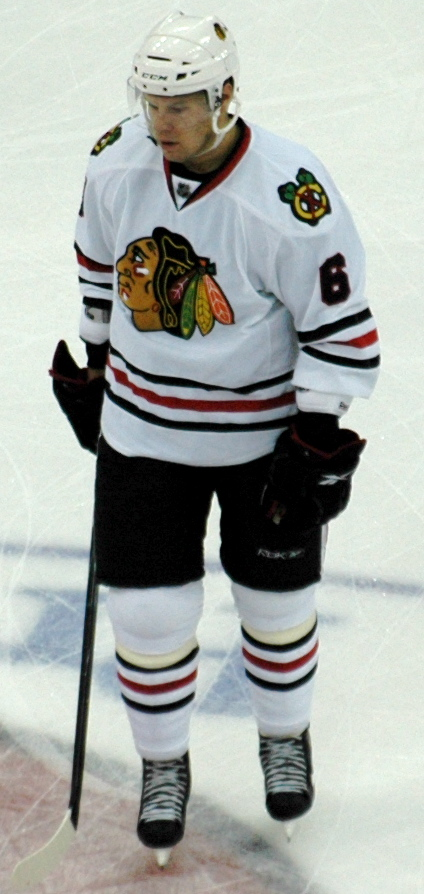
- Hendry with the Chicago Blackhawks in April 2010
- Born: February 23, 1984 (age 42) Nokomis, Saskatchewan, Canada
- Height: 6 ft 0 in (183 cm)
- Weight: 195 lb (88 kg; 13 st 13 lb)
- Position: Defence
- Shot: Left
- Played for: Chicago Blackhawks; HC Lugano; Anaheim Ducks; Straubing Tigers; AIK IF
- NHL draft: Undrafted
- Playing career: 2006–2015

Jordan Hendry (born February 23, 1984) is a Canadian former professional ice hockey player who played in the National Hockey League (NHL) with the Chicago Blackhawks and Anaheim Ducks. He won the Stanley Cup with the Blackhawks in 2010.

== Playing career ==
Hendry played four years of collegiate hockey with the University of Alaska Fairbanks of the Central Collegiate Hockey Association (CCHA). Undrafted, he signed his first professional contract with the Norfolk Admirals of the AHL on March 18, 2006. Hendry then played the end of the 2005–06 with the Admirals.

On July 17, 2006, Hendry was signed by the Admirals parent club, the Chicago Blackhawks, to a two-year contract.

After making his NHL debut in the 2007–08 season with the Blackhawks, Jordan was re-signed for a further two years on June 24, 2008.

On June 9, 2010, Hendry won the Stanley Cup with the Chicago Blackhawks. He brought the Cup to Nokomis the following July for pictures and autographs.

On February 27, 2011, during a game against the Phoenix Coyotes, Hendry suffered a season ending tear to the ACL in his left knee after a check from Coyotes forward Shane Doan sent him into the boards awkwardly.

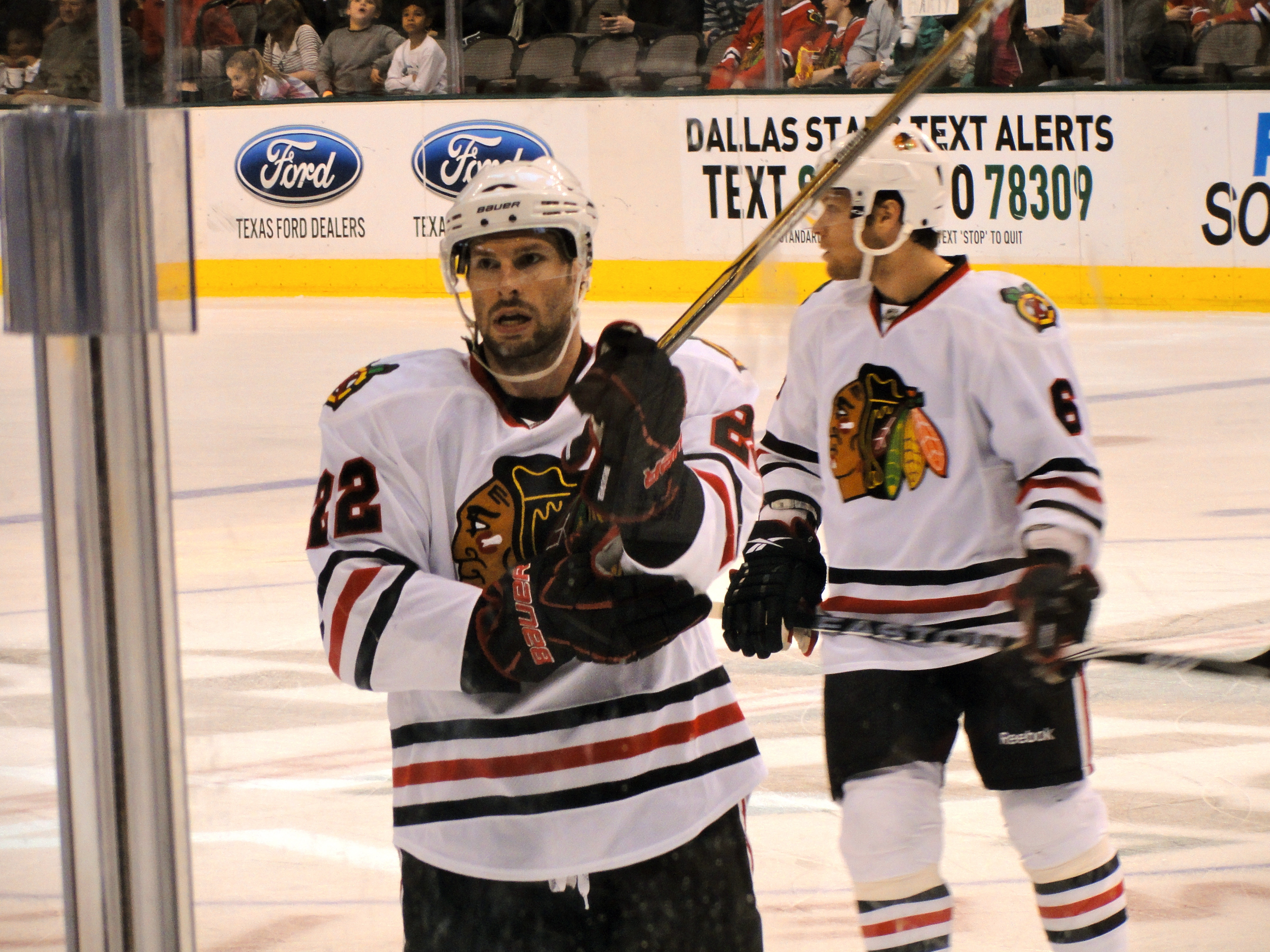
Hendry (right) and Troy Brouwer with the Blackhawks in February 2011

In August 2011, Hendry signed a tryout contract with the Minnesota Wild. After ten games with the Wild's AHL affiliate, the Houston Aeros, to start the 2011–12 season, Hendry was released from his try-out contract and on November 1, 2011, he signed to his first European contract in Switzerland on a one-year deal with HC Lugano of the National League A.

Hendry signed a one-year contract with the Anaheim Ducks on July 1, 2012. After he was originally assigned to AHL affiliate, the Norfolk Admirals, to begin the 2012-13 season he appeared in two games for the Ducks.

On July 12, 2013, Hendry returned to Europe in signing a one-year contract with German club, Straubing Tigers of the Deutsche Eishockey Liga. In the 2013–14 season, Hendry appeared in 38 games, contributing with 4 goals and 17 points before he left after the Tigers were out of contention for the playoffs, signing for the remainder of the season with Swedish Hockey League club, AIK on February 27, 2014.

== Career statistics ==
			Regular season					Playoffs
Season	Team	League	GP	G	A	Pts	PIM	GP	G	A	Pts	PIM
2002–03	U. of Alaska-Fairbanks	CCHA	35	3	5	8	10	—	—	—	—	—
2003–04	U. of Alaska-Fairbanks	CCHA	36	4	9	13	38	—	—	—	—	—
2004–05	U. of Alaska-Fairbanks	CCHA	3	0	1	1	21	—	—	—	—	—
2005–06	U. of Alaska-Fairbanks	CCHA	38	4	10	14	74	—	—	—	—	—
2005–06	Norfolk Admirals	AHL	13	1	4	5	13	3	0	0	0	2
2006–07	Norfolk Admirals	AHL	80	4	12	16	84	6	0	2	2	6
2007–08	Rockford IceHogs	AHL	45	3	4	7	58	1	0	0	0	2
2007–08	Chicago Blackhawks	NHL	40	1	3	4	22	—	—	—	—	—
2008–09	Chicago Blackhawks	NHL	9	0	0	0	0	—	—	—	—	—
2008–09	Rockford IceHogs	AHL	53	3	6	9	45	4	0	0	0	2
2009–10	Chicago Blackhawks	NHL	43	2	6	8	10	15	0	0	0	2
2010–11	Chicago Blackhawks	NHL	37	1	0	1	4	—	—	—	—	—
2011–12	Houston Aeros	AHL	10	0	2	2	10	—	—	—	—	—
2011–12	HC Lugano	NLA	29	1	9	10	18	5	0	0	0	2
2012–13	Norfolk Admirals	AHL	62	2	9	11	63	—	—	—	—	—
2012–13	Anaheim Ducks	NHL	2	0	0	0	0	—	—	—	—	—
2013–14	Straubing Tigers	DEL	38	4	13	17	99	—	—	—	—	—
2014–15	AIK IF	Allsv	51	2	10	12	46	—	—	—	—	—
NHL totals			131	4	9	13	40	15	0	0	0	2

== Awards and honours ==
Award	Year
NHL
Stanley Cup (Chicago Blackhawks)	2010
