= Brent Sopel =

Canadian ice hockey player (born 1977)

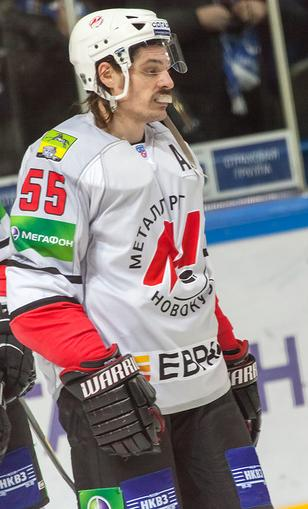
- Sopel with the Metallurg Novokuznetsk in November 2012
- Born: January 7, 1977 (age 49) Calgary, Alberta, Canada
- Height: 6 ft 2 in (188 cm)
- Weight: 220 lb (100 kg; 15 st 10 lb)
- Position: Defence
- Shot: Right
- Played for: Vancouver Canucks; New York Islanders; Los Angeles Kings; Chicago Blackhawks; Atlanta Thrashers; Montreal Canadiens; Metallurg Novokuznetsk; Salavat Yulaev Ufa
- NHL draft: 144th overall, 1995; Vancouver Canucks
- Playing career: 1997–2015

Brent Bernard Sopel (born January 7, 1977) is a Canadian former professional ice hockey defenceman who played the majority of his career in the National Hockey League (NHL). Sopel was originally selected 144th overall at the 1995 NHL entry draft by the Vancouver Canucks. He has also played for the New York Islanders, Los Angeles Kings, Chicago Blackhawks, Atlanta Thrashers and Montreal Canadiens, winning the Stanley Cup in 2010 with Chicago.

In addition to his NHL career, Sopel has also played in the Kontinental Hockey League (KHL) with Metallurg Novokuznetsk and Salavat Yulaev Ufa, also briefly playing for the American Hockey League (AHL)'s Chicago Wolves before retiring from professional hockey in 2015.

== Playing career ==
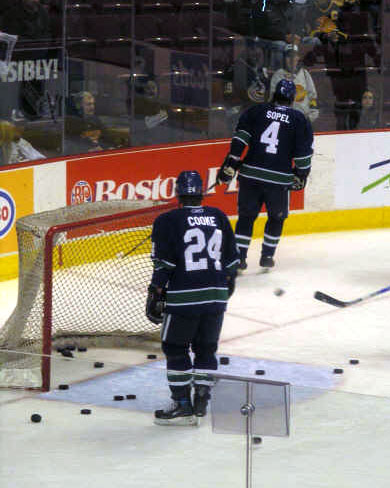
Sopel (right) and Matt Cooke during warm-ups with the Vancouver Canucks in April 2007.

=== Vancouver Canucks ===
On April 3, 1996, just under a year after being drafted, Sopel signed his first professional contract with his draft team, the Vancouver Canucks. He was told by Coach Marc Crawford that he would never play in the NHL, but Sopel scored his first NHL goal on April 10, 1999, against the Edmonton Oilers' Tommy Salo. In 2002, Sopel won the Fred J. Hume Award for Unsung Hero voted by the Vancouver Canucks Booster Club. On December 31, 2001, and January 21, 2002, Sopel won USA Today's NHL Player of the Week award.

=== New York Islanders ===
On August 3, 2005, the Canucks traded Sopel to the New York Islanders in exchange for a conditional draft pick in the 2006 NHL entry draft. On August 16, just under a week after being traded, Sopel signed a two-year, $4.8 million contract with the Islanders.

=== Return to Vancouver ===
Sopel was traded back to the Canucks during their 2006–07 season on February 1, 2007, the NHL trade deadline day. He missed the first game of the 2007 Stanley Cup playoffs against the Dallas Stars after he injured his back while picking up a cracker that was dropped by his daughter. The Canucks beat the Stars in quadruple overtime, in the sixth longest game in NHL history.

=== Chicago Blackhawks ===
Heading into the 2007–08 season with no contract, Sopel was invited to the Detroit Red Wings' training camp. However, on September 28, 2007, Sopel left Detroit's camp, instead signing a one-year, $1.5 million contract with the Chicago Blackhawks after the Red Wings had only offered a one-year, $500,000 contract. On January 10, 2008, Sopel signed a three-year, $7 million contract extension with the Blackhawks, keeping him in Chicago through to the 2010–11 season. On December 26, 2007, in a 5–2 win over the Nashville Predators, Sopel sustained a broken finger, resulting in him missing the next seven games. He then would miss 12 more games due to a wrist injury sustained on February 20, 2008, in a 3–0 win over the Minnesota Wild. He ended the season with a goal and 19 assists for 20 points in 58 contests.

After playing 23 games with the Blackhawks with two points recorded (a goal and an assist) to start the 2008–09 season, Sopel underwent elbow surgery, sidelining him for the remainder of the season.

Sopel played in 73 games for the Blackhawks in the 2009–10 season recording a goal and seven assists for eight points. His resurgent season resulted in him being named the Blackhawks nominee for the Bill Masterton Memorial Trophy as the player who best exemplifies the qualities of perseverance, sportsmanship, and dedication to hockey but was not named a top three finalist by the NHL. On June 9, 2010, Brent Sopel won the Stanley Cup with the Chicago Blackhawks as the team defeated the Philadelphia Flyers in six games in the Stanley Cup Final. He ended the 2010 playoffs with a goal and five assists for six points in all 22 playoff games. On June 22, Sopel brought the team's recently-won Stanley Cup to the 2010 Chicago Gay Pride Parade. Sopel brought the Cup to the parade in honour of the late Brendan Burke, son of his former general manager while playing for Vancouver, Brian Burke, to display it in the Chicago Gay Pride Parade, stating to the press that honouring Burke's legacy and his father's example of familial support and tolerance was one of his reasons for marching in the parade.

=== Atlanta Thrashers ===
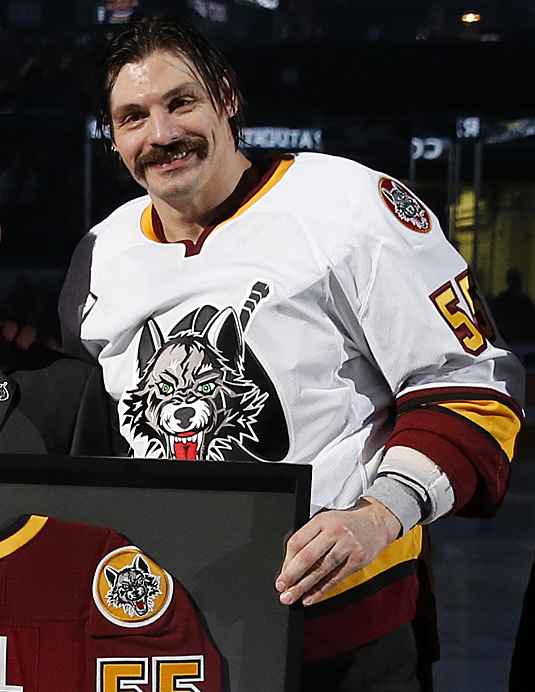
Sopel with the Chicago Wolves in January 2015

On June 23, 2010, Sopel was traded to the Atlanta Thrashers, along with Dustin Byfuglien, Ben Eager and Akim Aliu, in exchange for the 24th (Kevin Hayes) and 54th overall picks (Justin Holl) in the 2010 NHL entry draft, Marty Reasoner, Joey Crabb and Jeremy Morin.

=== Montreal Canadiens ===
After playing 59 games for Atlanta, registering two goals and seven points, Sopel was then traded to the Montreal Canadiens, along with Nigel Dawes, in exchange for Ben Maxwell and a fourth-round draft pick in 2011 on February 24, 2011. On March 8, in a 4–1 win over the Boston Bruins, Sopel sustained a broken left hand, causing him to miss the next seven games. He finished out the rest of the 2010–11 season pointless in 12 games. He also played all seven games and recorded a goal in the first round of the 2011 playoffs as the Canadiens would lose the series in seven games to the eventual Stanley Cup champion Boston Bruins.

=== Kontinental Hockey League ===
On July 29, 2011, Sopel announced that he had signed a two-year contract with Metallurg Novokuznetsk of the Kontinental Hockey League (KHL). During the 2012–13 season, his second with Novokuznetsk, Sopel was traded to Salavat Yulaev Ufa for their playoff campaign on January 31, 2013. During the subsequent summer, he signed a two-year contract extension with Salavat Yulaev.

=== Chicago Wolves ===
On October 10, 2014, the Chicago Wolves of the American Hockey League (AHL) announced that they had signed Sopel to a standard player contract for the 2014–15 season. On February 27, 2015, however, after 29 games played, Sopel announced his retirement from professional hockey.

== Personal life ==
Sopel resides in the Chicago Suburbs with his is wife Elizabeth Sopel.

Sopel was diagnosed with a learning disability after the symptoms of dyslexia sounded similar to his struggles. This inspired him to create the Brent Sopel Foundation to help promote and raise funds for youth with dyslexia.

== Career statistics ==
			Regular season					Playoffs
Season	Team	League	GP	G	A	Pts	PIM	GP	G	A	Pts	PIM
1993–94	Saskatoon Blades	WHL	11	2	2	4	2	—	—	—	—	—
1994–95	Saskatoon Blades	WHL	22	1	10	11	31	—	—	—	—	—
1994–95	Swift Current Broncos	WHL	41	4	19	23	50	3	0	3	3	0
1995–96	Swift Current Broncos	WHL	71	13	48	61	87	6	1	2	3	4
1995–96	Syracuse Crunch	AHL	1	0	0	0	0	—	—	—	—	—
1996–97	Swift Current Broncos	WHL	62	15	41	56	109	10	5	11	16	32
1996–97	Syracuse Crunch	AHL	2	0	0	0	0	3	0	0	0	0
1997–98	Syracuse Crunch	AHL	76	10	33	43	70	5	0	7	7	12
1998–99	Syracuse Crunch	AHL	53	10	21	31	59	—	—	—	—	—
1998–99	Vancouver Canucks	NHL	5	1	0	1	4	—	—	—	—	—
1999–2000	Syracuse Crunch	AHL	50	6	25	31	67	4	0	2	2	8
1999–2000	Vancouver Canucks	NHL	18	2	4	6	12	—	—	—	—	—
2000–01	Kansas City Blades	IHL	4	0	1	1	0	—	—	—	—	—
2000–01	Vancouver Canucks	NHL	52	4	10	14	10	4	0	0	0	2
2001–02	Vancouver Canucks	NHL	66	8	17	25	44	6	0	2	2	2
2002–03	Vancouver Canucks	NHL	81	7	30	37	23	14	2	6	8	4
2003–04	Vancouver Canucks	NHL	80	10	32	42	36	7	0	1	1	0
2005–06	New York Islanders	NHL	57	2	25	27	64	—	—	—	—	—
2005–06	Los Angeles Kings	NHL	11	0	1	1	6	—	—	—	—	—
2006–07	Los Angeles Kings	NHL	44	4	19	23	14	—	—	—	—	—
2006–07	Vancouver Canucks	NHL	20	1	4	5	10	11	0	0	0	2
2007–08	Chicago Blackhawks	NHL	58	1	19	20	28	—	—	—	—	—
2008–09	Chicago Blackhawks	NHL	23	1	1	2	8	—	—	—	—	—
2009–10	Chicago Blackhawks	NHL	73	1	7	8	34	22	1	5	6	8
2010–11	Atlanta Thrashers	NHL	59	2	5	7	16	—	—	—	—	—
2010–11	Montreal Canadiens	NHL	12	0	0	0	0	7	1	0	1	2
2011–12	Metallurg Novokuznetsk	KHL	47	2	6	8	33	—	—	—	—	—
2012–13	Metallurg Novokuznetsk	KHL	47	4	6	10	12	—	—	—	—	—
2012–13	Salavat Yulaev Ufa	KHL	4	0	2	2	0	14	4	1	5	6
2013–14	Salavat Yulaev Ufa	KHL	38	1	9	10	14	18	0	1	1	19
2014–15	Chicago Wolves	AHL	29	1	7	8	46	—	—	—	—	—
NHL totals			659	44	174	218	309	71	4	14	18	20
KHL totals			136	7	23	30	59	32	4	2	6	25

== Awards ==
- 2001 – Player of the Week (December 31, 2001 – January 6, 2002)
- 2002 – NHL Player of the Week (January 21–27)
- 2010 – Won Stanley Cup with the Chicago Blackhawks
