= 2010 Stanley Cup Final =

2010 ice hockey championship series

| | 1 | 2 | 3 | 4 | 5 | 6 | Total |
|---|---|---|---|---|---|---|---|
| Philadelphia Flyers | 5 | 1 | 4* | 5 | 4 | 3* | 2 |
| Chicago Blackhawks | 6 | 2 | 3* | 3 | 7 | 4* | 4 |
- * – Denotes overtime period(s)
- Location(s): Philadelphia: Wachovia Center (3, 4, 6); Chicago: United Center (1, 2, 5)
- Coaches: Philadelphia: Peter Laviolette; Chicago: Joel Quenneville
- Captains: Philadelphia: Mike Richards; Chicago: Jonathan Toews
- National anthems: Philadelphia: Lauren Hart and Kate Smith; Chicago: Jim Cornelison
- Referees: Bill McCreary (1, 3, 5); Dan O'Halloran (1, 3, 5); Kelly Sutherland (2, 4, 6); Stephen Walkom (2, 4, 6)
- Dates: May 29 – June 9, 2010
- MVP: Jonathan Toews (Blackhawks)
- Series-winning goal: Patrick Kane (4:06, OT)
- Hall of Famers: Blackhawks: Marian Hossa (2020); Duncan Keith (2025); Flyers: Chris Pronger (2015); Officials: Bill McCreary (2014)
- Networks: Canada: (English): CBC (French): RDS; United States: (English): NBC (1–2, 5–6), Versus (3–4)
- Announcers: (CBC) Jim Hughson, Craig Simpson, and Glenn Healy (RDS) Pierre Houde and Benoit Brunet (NBC/Versus) Mike Emrick and Eddie Olczyk (NHL International) Dave Strader and Joe Micheletti

The 2010 Stanley Cup Final was the championship series of the National Hockey League's (NHL) 2009–10 season, and the culmination of the 2010 Stanley Cup playoffs. It was contested between the Western Conference champion Chicago Blackhawks and the Eastern Conference champion Philadelphia Flyers. It was Chicago's 11th appearance in the Finals and their first since 1992, a loss to the Pittsburgh Penguins. It was Philadelphia's eighth appearance in the Finals and their first since 1997, a loss to the Detroit Red Wings. Chicago defeated Philadelphia four games to two to win their fourth Stanley Cup in franchise history, and their first since 1961, ending what was the longest active Stanley Cup drought at the time.

The Blackhawks became the fourth major Chicago sports team to win a championship since 1984, joining the 1985 Chicago Bears, the Chicago Bulls dynasty of the 1990s, and the 2005 Chicago White Sox. The 2016 Chicago Cubs would complete the cycle of all Chicago sports teams winning at least one championship in 30 years. Blackhawks captain Jonathan Toews was awarded the Conn Smythe Trophy as the Most Valuable Player of the 2010 playoffs, and was the first Blackhawks player to receive this honor. He and teammates Duncan Keith and Brent Seabrook won the Olympic gold medal with Team Canada at the 2010 Winter Olympics, adding the three players to the list of Ken Morrow (1980) and Steve Yzerman and Brendan Shanahan (both 2002), as well as Drew Doughty and Jeff Carter (both 2014), as the only players to accomplish this double in the same year. Having played for Team USA at the Olympics, Patrick Kane joined Chris Chelios and Brett Hull (both 2002) as having won both the Olympic silver medal and Stanley Cup in the same year. Jonathan Toews also became the 24th player and the seventh Canadian to become a member of the Triple Gold Club having won an Olympic gold medal, an IIHF World Championship Gold Medal, and the Stanley Cup.

== Paths to the Final ==
This was the third straight Finals in which the Western Conference team was an Original Six team that won the Central Division and the Eastern Conference team was an Atlantic Division team from the state of Pennsylvania. The Red Wings and Penguins played each other in the Stanley Cup Final in 2008 and 2009.

The Blackhawks and Flyers had previously met in the 1971 playoffs; the Blackhawks defeated the Flyers in four games.

=== Chicago Blackhawks ===
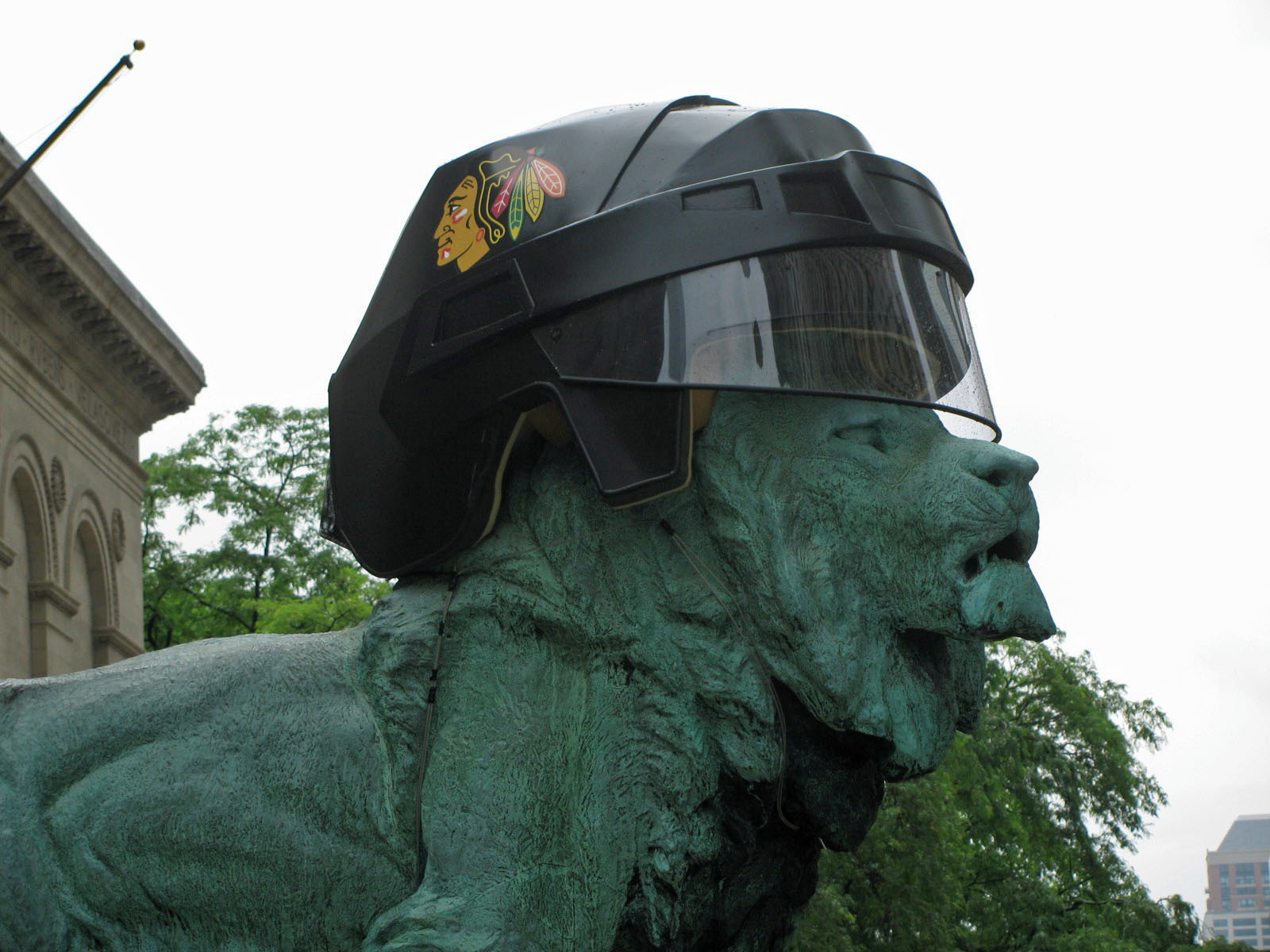
Northern sculpture

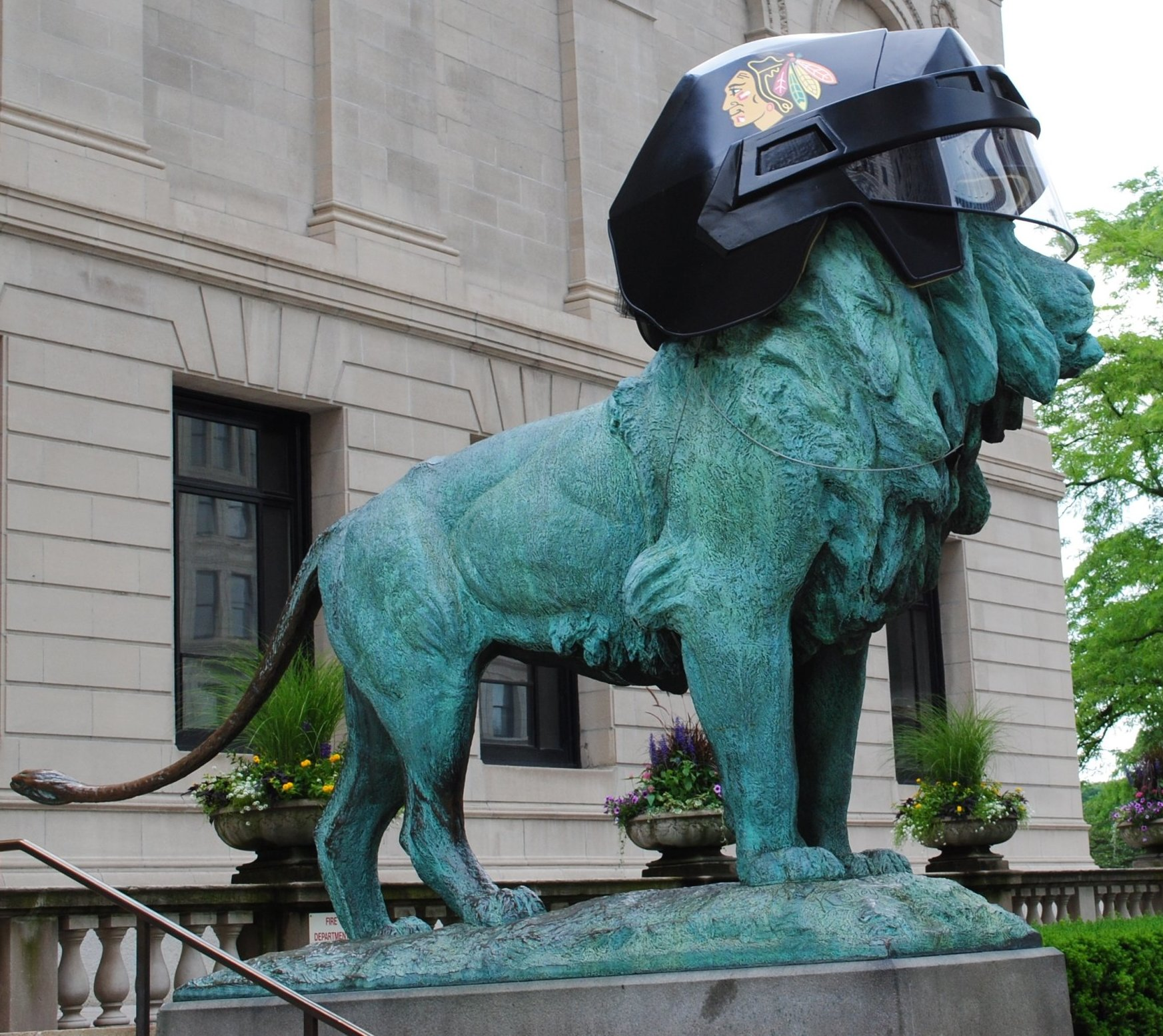
Southern sculpture

The lion sculptures outside of the Art Institute of Chicago decorated to celebrate the Chicago Blackhawks' postseason

The Chicago Blackhawks finished the regular season as the Central Division champions with 112 points. This was the 14th division title in franchise history for Chicago, but the first since 1992–93 when it was called the Norris Division. As the second seed in the Western Conference playoffs, the Blackhawks defeated the seventh seed Nashville Predators and the third seed Vancouver Canucks in six games each, and then swept the first seed San Jose Sharks in the Western Conference Final to advance to the Finals for the first time since 1992.

Chicago's Marian Hossa is the first player in NHL history to appear in three straight Stanley Cup Final with three different teams. He previously made the Final with the Pittsburgh Penguins in 2008 and with the Detroit Red Wings in 2009. Along with Hossa, the other half of Chicago's preseason acquisition from Detroit, Tomas Kopecky, was also playing in his third straight Stanley Cup Final.

=== Philadelphia Flyers ===
The Philadelphia Flyers earned the seventh seed in the Eastern Conference playoffs after finishing the regular season with 88 points, and winning the tiebreaker over the Montreal Canadiens, with more wins (41 to 39). The Flyers were the last team to qualify for the 2010 Stanley Cup playoffs. Their Cinderella march to the Finals began on the final day of the regular season when they met the New York Rangers in a winner-take-all match-up for the final playoff spot. Philadelphia defeated their Atlantic Division rivals 2–1 in a shootout, the first do-or-die shootout for a playoff spot in NHL history.

In the first round of the playoffs, the Flyers upset the second seed divisional rival New Jersey Devils in five games. In the second round, against the sixth-seeded Boston Bruins, Philadelphia became the third NHL team to win a seven-game series after being down three games to none (the others being the 1942 Toronto Maple Leafs and the 1975 New York Islanders). In addition, in game seven of that series, the Flyers rallied from a three goals to none deficit to win the game and series, 4–3.

In the Eastern Conference Final, the Flyers eliminated the Canadiens in five games to advance to the Stanley Cup Final for the first time since 1997. They were also the first team to reach the Finals with less than 90 points in the regular season since the Vancouver Canucks in 1994, when they had 85. It also gave the city of Philadelphia the distinction of being the first city to have all its teams play in each of the four professional sports leagues title rounds since 2000, following the 76ers in the 2001 NBA Finals, the Eagles in Super Bowl XXXIX after the 2004 season, and the Phillies in back-to-back World Series in 2008 and 2009, winning in 2008 to bring the city of Philadelphia a championship after 25 years. The Flyers attempted to win the Stanley Cup for the first time since winning back-to-back Stanley Cups in 1974 and 1975.

== Game summaries ==
Number in parentheses represents the player's total in goals or assists to that point of the entire four rounds of the playoffs

=== Game one ===
| May 29 | Philadelphia Flyers | 5–6 | Chicago Blackhawks | United Center | Recap |

The Chicago Blackhawks won the first game by a score of 6–5 on the strength of two goals by Troy Brouwer. Throughout the game, the two teams traded goals with neither team having a lead greater than one. The Flyers opened the scoring at 6:38 of the first period on a goal by Ville Leino that deflected off the face of Niklas Hjalmarsson. The Blackhawks responded with two quick goals, one of which was shorthanded, to take the lead. The lead would not last long, however, as the Flyers would counter with two goals of their own to re-take the lead 3–2 after the first period. Patrick Sharp scored 1:11 into the second period to tie the game once again. Both teams would trade goals once again and tie the game at five after the second period. Michael Leighton was replaced by Brian Boucher after allowing the fifth Chicago goal. In the third period, Tomas Kopecky scored what would eventually prove to be the game winner at 8:25. Antti Niemi finished the game with 27 saves on 32 shots while Leighton saved 15 out of 20 shots. Boucher stopped 11 of 12 shots faced in relief of Leighton.

Scoring summary
| Period | Team | Goal | Assist(s) | Time | Score |
|---|---|---|---|---|---|
| 1st | PHI | Ville Leino (5) | Daniel Briere (10) and Chris Pronger (11) | 06:38 | 1–0 PHI |
| 1st | CHI | Troy Brouwer (3) | Marian Hossa (10) and Brent Sopel (4) | 07:46 | 1–1 |
| 1st | CHI | Dave Bolland (6) – sh | None | 11:50 | 2–1 CHI |
| 1st | PHI | Scott Hartnell (4) – pp | Daniel Briere (11) and Chris Pronger (12) | 16:37 | 2–2 |
| 1st | PHI | Daniel Briere (10) | Ville Leino (9) and Scott Hartnell (6) | 19:33 | 3–2 PHI |
| 2nd | CHI | Patrick Sharp (8) | Troy Brouwer (2) and Niklas Hjalmarsson (5) | 01:11 | 3–3 |
| 2nd | PHI | Blair Betts (1) | Arron Asham (3) and Darroll Powe (1) | 07:20 | 4–3 PHI |
| 2nd | CHI | Kris Versteeg (5) | Tomas Kopecky (2) and Duncan Keith (10) | 09:31 | 4–4 |
| 2nd | CHI | Troy Brouwer (4) | Marian Hossa (11) and Niklas Hjalmarsson (6) | 15:18 | 5–4 CHI |
| 2nd | PHI | Arron Asham (4) | Daniel Briere (12) and Scott Hartnell (7) | 18:49 | 5–5 |
| 3rd | CHI | Tomas Kopecky (4) | Kris Versteeg (6) and Dave Bolland (6) | 08:25 | 6–5 CHI |
Penalty summary
| Period | Team | Player | Penalty | Time | PIM |
| 1st | CHI | Ben Eager | Cross-checking | 03:26 | 2:00 |
| 1st | CHI | Patrick Kane | Slashing | 09:58 | 2:00 |
| 1st | CHI | Brian Campbell | High-sticking | 15:51 | 2:00 |
| 2nd | CHI | Adam Burish | Boarding | 04:59 | 2:00 |
| 3rd | None | | | | |

Shots by period
| Team | 1 | 2 | 3 | Total |
|---|---|---|---|---|
| PHI | 17 | 9 | 6 | 32 |
| CHI | 9 | 15 | 8 | 32 |

=== Game two ===
| May 31 | Philadelphia Flyers | 1–2 | Chicago Blackhawks | United Center | Recap |

The Blackhawks took game two of the best-of-seven series by a score of 2–1, thus giving them a 2–0 series lead heading into games three and four in Philadelphia. In contrast to game one, game two was a low-scoring affair with much tighter defense displayed by both teams. Neither team would score in the opening frame as the game entered the first intermission scoreless. It was not until late in the second period that Chicago managed to get the ice breaker with a goal from Marian Hossa. The Blackhawks quickly added another goal just 28 seconds later on a wrist shot by Ben Eager. The Flyers would eventually reply in the third period on a power play goal by Simon Gagne but it would not be enough. Both goaltenders were much stronger as Antti Niemi stopped 32 of 33 shots for the Blackhawks while Michael Leighton rebounded with 24 stops on 26 shots.

Scoring summary
| Period | Team | Goal | Assist(s) | Time | Score |
|---|---|---|---|---|---|
| 1st | None | | | | |
| 2nd | CHI | Marian Hossa (3) | Troy Brouwer (3) and Patrick Sharp (10) | 17:09 | 1–0 CHI |
| 2nd | CHI | Ben Eager (1) | Dustin Byfuglien (3) | 17:37 | 2–0 CHI |
| 3rd | PHI | Simon Gagne (8) – pp | Mike Richards (16) and Jeff Carter (2) | 05:20 | 2–1 CHI |
Penalty summary
| Period | Team | Player | Penalty | Time | PIM |
| 1st | CHI | Kris Versteeg | Interference | 07:26 | 2:00 |
| 1st | PHI | Blair Betts | Cross-checking | 14:48 | 2:00 |
| 1st | CHI | Tomas Kopecky | Elbowing | 17:27 | 2:00 |
| 1st | PHI | Daniel Carcillo | Unsportsmanlike conduct | 17:27 | 2:00 |
| 1st | PHI | Mike Richards | Elbowing | 17:27 | 2:00 |
| 2nd | PHI | Mike Richards | Hooking | 05:08 | 2:00 |
| 2nd | CHI | Troy Brouwer | Roughing | 19:24 | 2:00 |
| 3rd | CHI | Patrick Sharp | Tripping | 03:21 | 2:00 |

Shots by period
| Team | 1 | 2 | 3 | Total |
|---|---|---|---|---|
| PHI | 3 | 15 | 15 | 33 |
| CHI | 9 | 13 | 4 | 26 |

=== Game three ===
| June 2 | Chicago Blackhawks | 3–4 | OT | Philadelphia Flyers | Wachovia Center | Recap |

The Flyers won game three in overtime, 4–3, to pull within two games to one in the series. Daniel Briere opened the scoring for Philadelphia with a power play goal at 14:58 of the first period. Duncan Keith tied the game at 1–1 early in the second period, and both teams added another goal to leave the score at 2–2 entering the third period. Patrick Kane scored with 17:10 remaining in the game to give the Blackhawks their first lead, but Ville Leino responded with the tying goal 20 seconds later. In overtime, shortly after a review determined that a shot by Gagne was not a goal, Claude Giroux scored the game-winner at 5:59 of the extra period. This was the first time since 1987 that the Flyers had won a game in the Stanley Cup Final.

Scoring summary
| Period | Team | Goal | Assist(s) | Time | Score |
|---|---|---|---|---|---|
| 1st | PHI | Daniel Briere (11) – pp | Scott Hartnell (8) and Braydon Coburn (3) | 14:58 | 1–0 PHI |
| 2nd | CHI | Duncan Keith (2) | Patrick Kane (14) and Marian Hossa (12) | 02:49 | 1–1 |
| 2nd | PHI | Scott Hartnell (5) – pp | Chris Pronger (13) and Claude Giroux (10) | 09:55 | 2–1 PHI |
| 2nd | CHI | Brent Sopel (1) | John Madden (1) | 17:52 | 2–2 |
| 3rd | CHI | Patrick Kane (8) | Jonathan Toews (20) and Ben Eager (2) | 02:50 | 3–2 CHI |
| 3rd | PHI | Ville Leino (6) | Claude Giroux (11) and Matt Carle (11) | 03:10 | 3–3 |
| OT | PHI | Claude Giroux (9) | Matt Carle (12) and Daniel Briere (13) | 05:59 | 4–3 PHI |
Penalty summary
| Period | Team | Player | Penalty | Time | PIM |
| 1st | CHI | Marian Hossa | Slashing | 13:54 | 2:00 |
| 1st | PHI | Daniel Carcillo | Charging | 18:05 | 2:00 |
| 1st | CHI | Dustin Byfuglien | Roughing | 20:00 | 2:00 |
| 2nd | PHI | Chris Pronger | High-sticking | 03:36 | 2:00 |
| 2nd | CHI | Dustin Byfuglien | Slashing | 09:31 | 2:00 |
| 2nd | PHI | Michael Leighton (served by Ville Leino) | Delay of game | 14:59 | 2:00 |
| 3rd | None | | | | |
| OT | None | | | | |

Shots by period
| Team | 1 | 2 | 3 | OT | Total |
|---|---|---|---|---|---|
| CHI | 9 | 12 | 4 | 2 | 27 |
| PHI | 9 | 7 | 15 | 1 | 32 |

=== Game four ===
| June 4 | Chicago Blackhawks | 3–5 | Philadelphia Flyers | Wachovia Center | Recap |

The Flyers evened the series at two games apiece by winning game four, 5–3. The Flyers took the lead 4:35 into the game on a Mike Richards power play goal. Matt Carle extended their lead to 2–0 at 14:48 of the first period. Sharp cut Philadelphia's lead in half with 1:28 left in the period, but Giroux restored the Flyers' two-goal advantage 51 seconds later. Following a scoreless second period, Leino gave Philadelphia a three-goal lead 6:43 into the third period. Dave Bolland (on a power play) and Brian Campbell scored later in the third to leave Chicago trailing 4–3 with 4:10 remaining. However, Jeff Carter scored an empty-net goal with 25 seconds left to clinch the Flyers' victory.

Scoring summary
| Period | Team | Goal | Assist(s) | Time | Score |
|---|---|---|---|---|---|
| 1st | PHI | Mike Richards (7) – pp | Unassisted | 04:35 | 1–0 PHI |
| 1st | PHI | Matt Carle (1) | Unassisted | 14:48 | 2–0 PHI |
| 1st | CHI | Patrick Sharp (9) | Duncan Keith (11) | 18:32 | 2–1 PHI |
| 1st | PHI | Claude Giroux (10) | Kimmo Timonen (9) and Scott Hartnell (9) | 19:23 | 3–1 PHI |
| 2nd | None | | | | |
| 3rd | PHI | Ville Leino (7) | Daniel Briere (14) and James van Riemsdyk (3) | 06:43 | 4–1 PHI |
| 3rd | CHI | Dave Bolland (7) – pp | Duncan Keith (12) and Patrick Kane (15) | 12:01 | 4–2 PHI |
| 3rd | CHI | Brian Campbell (1) | Andrew Ladd (2) and Duncan Keith (13) | 15:50 | 4–3 PHI |
| 3rd | PHI | Jeff Carter (5) – en | Unassisted | 19:35 | 5–3 PHI |
Penalty summary
| Period | Team | Player | Penalty | Time | PIM |
| 1st | CHI | Andrew Ladd | Interference | 00:35 | 2:00 |
| 1st | CHI | Tomas Kopecky | High-sticking | 04:30 | 2:00 |
| 1st | PHI | Kimmo Timonen | Hooking | 08:16 | 2:00 |
| 2nd | CHI | Dave Bolland | High-sticking | 01:27 | 2:00 |
| 2nd | CHI | Patrick Sharp | Slashing | 12:53 | 2:00 |
| 2nd | CHI | Nick Boynton | Slashing | 18:22 | 2:00 |
| 2nd | PHI | Scott Hartnell | Cross-checking | 18:22 | 2:00 |
| 3rd | CHI | Brent Seabrook | Cross-checking | 08:03 | 2:00 |
| 3rd | PHI | Scott Hartnell | Unsportsmanlike conduct | 10:46 | 2:00 |
| 3rd | PHI | Braydon Coburn | Holding | 11:49 | 2:00 |
| 3rd | CHI | Kris Versteeg | Slashing | 19:42 | 2:00 |

Shots by period
| Team | 1 | 2 | 3 | Total |
|---|---|---|---|---|
| CHI | 11 | 13 | 10 | 34 |
| PHI | 8 | 10 | 13 | 31 |

=== Game five ===
| June 6 | Philadelphia Flyers | 4–7 | Chicago Blackhawks | United Center | Recap |

The Blackhawks took a 3–2 lead in the series with a 7–4 victory in game five. At 12:17 of the first period, Brent Seabrook scored on a power play to give Chicago the lead. Within the next six minutes, the Blackhawks tripled their advantage, adding goals by Bolland and Kris Versteeg to make the score 3–0. At the start of the second period, the Flyers again took Leighton out of the game, replacing him with Boucher. Four goals were scored in the second period—two by each team—and the Blackhawks entered the third period with a 5–2 lead. James van Riemsdyk pulled Philadelphia within two goals at 6:36 of the third. Sharp made the score 6–3 with 3:52 remaining, but Gagne answered for the Flyers 1:16 later. Thirty-one seconds after Gagne's goal, Dustin Byfuglien tallied an empty-net goal—his second goal of the game—which concluded the scoring. Flyers' alternate captain Chris Pronger was on the ice for six of Chicago's goals and was in the penalty box on the seventh. Discounting the power play goal, Pronger finished -5 on the game.

Scoring summary
| Period | Team | Goal | Assist(s) | Time | Score |
|---|---|---|---|---|---|
| 1st | CHI | Brent Seabrook (4) – pp | Kris Versteeg (7) and Troy Brouwer (4) | 12:17 | 1–0 CHI |
| 1st | CHI | Dave Bolland (8) | Brent Sopel (5) and Dustin Byfuglien (4) | 15:26 | 2–0 CHI |
| 1st | CHI | Kris Versteeg (6) | Brent Seabrook (7) and Dustin Byfuglien (5) | 18:15 | 3–0 CHI |
| 2nd | PHI | Scott Hartnell (6) | Ville Leino (10) and Daniel Briere (15) | 00:32 | 3–1 CHI |
| 2nd | CHI | Patrick Kane (9) | Andrew Ladd (3) and Patrick Sharp (11) | 03:13 | 4–1 CHI |
| 2nd | PHI | Kimmo Timonen (1) | Daniel Briere (16) and Ville Leino (11) | 04:38 | 4–2 CHI |
| 2nd | CHI | Dustin Byfuglien (9) – pp | Jonathan Toews (21) and Duncan Keith (14) | 15:45 | 5–2 CHI |
| 3rd | PHI | James van Riemsdyk (3) | Lukas Krajicek (2) and Kimmo Timonen (10) | 06:36 | 5–3 CHI |
| 3rd | CHI | Patrick Sharp (10) | Patrick Kane (16) | 16:08 | 6–3 CHI |
| 3rd | PHI | Simon Gagne (9) | Ville Leino (12) | 17:24 | 6–4 CHI |
| 3rd | CHI | Dustin Byfuglien (10) – en | Kris Versteeg (8) and Dave Bolland (7) | 17:55 | 7–4 CHI |
Penalty summary
| Period | Team | Player | Penalty | Time | PIM |
| 1st | PHI | Lukas Krajicek | Cross checking | 02:50 | 2:00 |
| 1st | CHI | Dave Bolland | Cross checking | 09:15 | 2:00 |
| 1st | PHI | Scott Hartnell | High-sticking | 11:16 | 2:00 |
| 2nd | PHI | Scott Hartnell | Elbowing | 07:19 | 2:00 |
| 2nd | CHI | Brent Seabrook | Closing hand on puck | 09:51 | 2:00 |
| 2nd | PHI | Chris Pronger | Hooking | 15:18 | 2:00 |
| 3rd | CHI | Kris Versteeg | Slashing | 04:59 | 2:00 |

Shots by period
| Team | 1 | 2 | 3 | Total |
|---|---|---|---|---|
| PHI | 7 | 10 | 10 | 27 |
| CHI | 13 | 8 | 7 | 28 |

=== Game six ===
| June 9 | Chicago Blackhawks | 4–3 | OT | Philadelphia Flyers | Wachovia Center | Recap |

External videos
- Game 6 Full replay (NHL International's feed) on the NHL's official YouTube channel

The sixth game required overtime, as the score was tied 3–3 at the end of the third period. Patrick Kane of the Chicago Blackhawks scored the Cup-winning goal at 4:06 into the overtime period, a shot in which the puck crossed the goal line and then got stuck underneath the padding in the back of the net. Several observers, including most of the players, announcers, and all the officials initially lost sight of the puck. Only Kane and Patrick Sharp started to celebrate immediately, soon followed by the rest of the Blackhawks. It was only after a video review that the goal was officially awarded.

Jonathan Toews won the Conn Smythe Trophy as playoff MVP. It was the first Cup to be won in overtime since 2000.

Scoring summary
| Period | Team | Goal | Assist(s) | Time | Score |
|---|---|---|---|---|---|
| 1st | CHI | Dustin Byfuglien (11) – pp | Jonathan Toews (22) and Patrick Kane (17) | 16:49 | 1–0 CHI |
| 1st | PHI | Scott Hartnell (7) – pp | Daniel Briere (17) and Chris Pronger (14) | 19:33 | 1–1 |
| 2nd | PHI | Daniel Briere (12) | Ville Leino (13) and Lukas Krajicek (3) | 08:00 | 2–1 PHI |
| 2nd | CHI | Patrick Sharp (11) | Dave Bolland (8) and Duncan Keith (15) | 09:58 | 2–2 |
| 2nd | CHI | Andrew Ladd (3) | Niklas Hjalmarsson (7) and Patrick Kane (18) | 17:43 | 3–2 CHI |
| 3rd | PHI | Scott Hartnell (8) | Ville Leino (14) and Daniel Briere (18) | 16:01 | 3–3 |
| OT | CHI | Patrick Kane (10) | Brian Campbell (4) | 04:06 | 4–3 CHI |
Penalty summary
| Period | Team | Player | Penalty | Time | PIM |
| 1st | PHI | Chris Pronger | Holding | 08:42 | 2:00 |
| 1st | CHI | Brent Sopel | Interference | 13:28 | 2:00 |
| 1st | PHI | Chris Pronger | High-sticking | 16:29 | 2:00 |
| 1st | CHI | Brent Seabrook | Elbowing | 16:59 | 2:00 |
| 1st | CHI | Brent Sopel | Interference | 19:07 | 2:00 |
| 2nd | PHI | Scott Hartnell | High-sticking | 01:56 | 2:00 |
| 2nd | PHI | Braydon Coburn | Cross checking | 08:09 | 2:00 |
| 2nd | CHI | Marian Hossa | Goaltender interference | 09:29 | 2:00 |
| 2nd | PHI | Daniel Briere | Cross checking | 18:32 | 2:00 |
| 3rd | None | | | | |
| OT | None | | | | |

Shots by period
| Team | 1 | 2 | 3 | OT | Total |
|---|---|---|---|---|---|
| CHI | 17 | 10 | 12 | 2 | 41 |
| PHI | 7 | 6 | 9 | 2 | 24 |

== Officials ==
- Referees: Bill McCreary, Dan O'Halloran, Kelly Sutherland, Stephen Walkom
- Linesmen: Greg Devorski, Steve Miller, Jean Morin, Pierre Racicot

== Television ==
In Canada, the series was televised in English on CBC and in French on the cable network RDS. In the United States, NBC broadcast games one, two, five, and six, while Versus televised games three and four. In Europe, Viasat Sport broadcast the televised finals in Sweden, Finland, Norway, Denmark, and the Baltic States (Latvia, Lithuania, and Estonia), through five regional divisions of Viasat Sport. Its sister channel Viasat Sport East broadcast in the Russian language to the European and Eurasian countries of Russia, Belarus, Georgia, Moldova, Kazakhstan, Ukraine, Armenia, Kyrgyzstan, and Uzbekistan.

=== Ratings ===
Game one produced the best overnight rating in the United States for a game one since the 1999 Final. The 2.8 overnight rating and six share was a 12-percent increase from the first game of the 2009 Final between the Pittsburgh Penguins and Detroit Red Wings. Meanwhile, in Canada, game one was viewed by 3.164 million people on CBC.

Game two of the series, on Memorial Day, earned a 4.1 rating. The number of viewers increased as the game averaged approximately six million viewers with a peak of 6.940 million at 10:30 pm ET. According to NBC, this is the highest game two since at least the 1975 Final because data prior to then is unavailable. Game two also saw a 21-percent increase over 2009's second game. In local markets game two drew a 25.1 rating and 39 share in Chicago along with an 18.5 rating and 28 share in Philadelphia.

Game three returned to cable on Versus where it received a 2.0 rating and 3.6 million viewers. The broadcast peaked at 5.1 million viewers at 10:30 pm ET. It ranked as the highest rated and most viewed program in the history of Versus. It also ranked as the highest-rated and most-viewed Stanley Cup Final game on cable television since 2002.

Game four saw a decline of 9% from the 2009 Final between the Penguins and the Red Wings as just 3.1 million viewers tuned into the game.

With the series returning to broadcast television on NBC, the ratings trend rebounded and improved over the 2009 Final ratings trend. Game five's prime time portion of the broadcast received a 3.3 final rating and averaged 5.8 million viewers, an increase of 38% in the ratings and 32% in viewers over the 2009 Final. Locally, the Chicago market received a 26.0 rating while Philadelphia had a 19.7 rating. The average for the three NBC broadcasts rose to 5.4 million viewers, an increase of 800,000 compared to 2009. This increase came despite going head to head with the 2010 NBA Finals.

Game six was the most-watched NHL game since game six in 1974, drawing a 4.7 rating and 8 share, up 38 percent vs. 3.4/6 for game six in 2009. The top two markets were Chicago, with a 32.8/50 and Philadelphia, 26.8/38. In Canada, game six was the most-watched all-American Stanley Cup Final game on the CBC, with 4.077 million viewers. The Final averaged 3.107 million viewers, up 44 percent from 2009.

== Impact and aftermath ==
=== Blackhawks ===
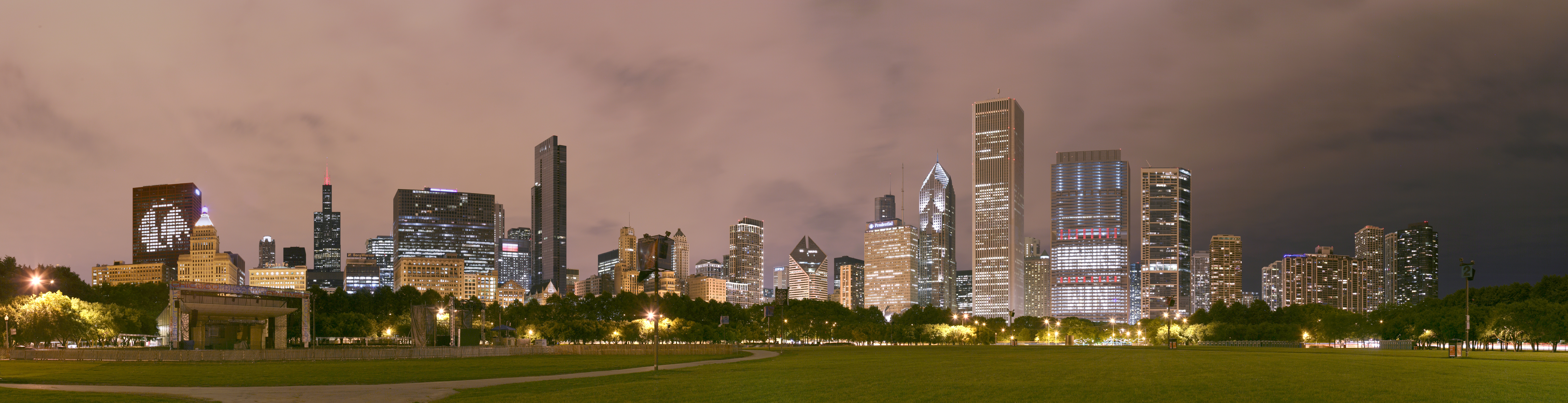
Chicago skyline with the CNA Center showing the Chicago Blackhawks' logo, the Willis Tower's spires lit in red, the Smurfit-Stone Building saying Go Hawks and the Blue Cross Blue Shield Tower saying Hawks win the night after the Chicago Blackhawks won the Stanley Cup, viewed from the Petrillo Music Shell lawn in Grant Park.

The win was the Blackhawks' first championship since 1961. It gave the city of Chicago the distinction of being the first city to have at least a championship in each of the four major professional sports since 1985. It also vaulted Toews into the Triple Gold Club, winning the Olympic gold medal in Vancouver earlier in 2010 and an IIHF World Championship Gold medal in 2007. Toews and defencemen Duncan Keith and Brent Seabrook also became the fourth, fifth, and sixth players to win Olympic Gold and the Stanley Cup in the same year. With Chicago's win, the Toronto Maple Leafs are now the only Original Six team not to win the Stanley Cup or play in the Finals since the 1967 expansion; their most recent Finals appearance is 1967.

The day after the Blackhawks won the Stanley Cup, Chicago Mayor Richard M. Daley issued a proclamation declaring June 11 Chicago Blackhawks Day in the city of Chicago. That day, an estimated two million Chicagoans attended the Blackhawks Stanley Cup parade, more than the estimated 1.75 million who attended the parade for the Chicago White Sox's 2005 World Series championship, and more than the rallies at Grant Park for any of the Chicago Bulls' NBA championships. The Blackhawks' celebration also overshadowed the series between the White Sox and Chicago Cubs taking place around the same time. However, White Sox manager Ozzie Guillén said that the parade the White Sox had was far bigger than the Blackhawks'. Daley presented the proclamation to the team at the celebratory parade and rally.

US President Barack Obama, a former US Senator from Illinois and Chicago resident, phoned Joel Quennville to congratulate his team and to invite them to the White House. Obama joked that he now had "bragging rights" over Vice President Joe Biden, a Flyers fan.

=== Flyers ===
The loss by the Flyers was the sixth straight Finals series they lost, tying them with the 1933–40 Toronto Maple Leafs and the 1956–95 Detroit Red Wings for most consecutive Finals lost.

=== The missing Cup-winning puck ===
Since the Cup-winning puck got stuck underneath the padding in the back of the net to end game six, there was controversy and speculation as to its whereabouts. Amid the confusion involving the video review and the subsequent celebrations, the Cup-winning puck got lost. Because it ended the Blackhawks' then-record for the longest active Cup drought, it was considered a valuable piece of sport memorabilia. So much so, a Chicago-based restaurant offered a $50,000 reward for it, and the FBI was called in to investigate the case.

Video and pictures taken from the game indicated that linesman Steve Miller was the first person who took the puck after the game-winning goal was scored, but he denied knowing where it eventually went. As a result of an ESPN story about the controversy on April 21, 2011, the league relieved Miller of his 2011 postseason duties for more than a week, citing that the controversy was a potential distraction during the playoffs. In reinstating Miller, the league said it stood by him and his story.

== Controversy ==
Controversy came throughout the first four games between the Blackhawks and Flyer defenceman Chris Pronger. Chicago complained that Pronger had gotten away with rough play that they felt was beyond the rules. The Blackhawks argued that even when they responded with the same actions that Pronger was being allowed to get away with, that they would instead be given a penalty. The Blackhawks set up a meeting with the NHL to make a complaint about Pronger's play.

Pronger had been noticed by the media and the NHL at the end of games one and two of the series as he picked up and left with the game puck at the conclusion of the games. When asked, Pronger replied that he had thrown the pucks in the garbage.

== Team rosters ==
=== Chicago Blackhawks ===
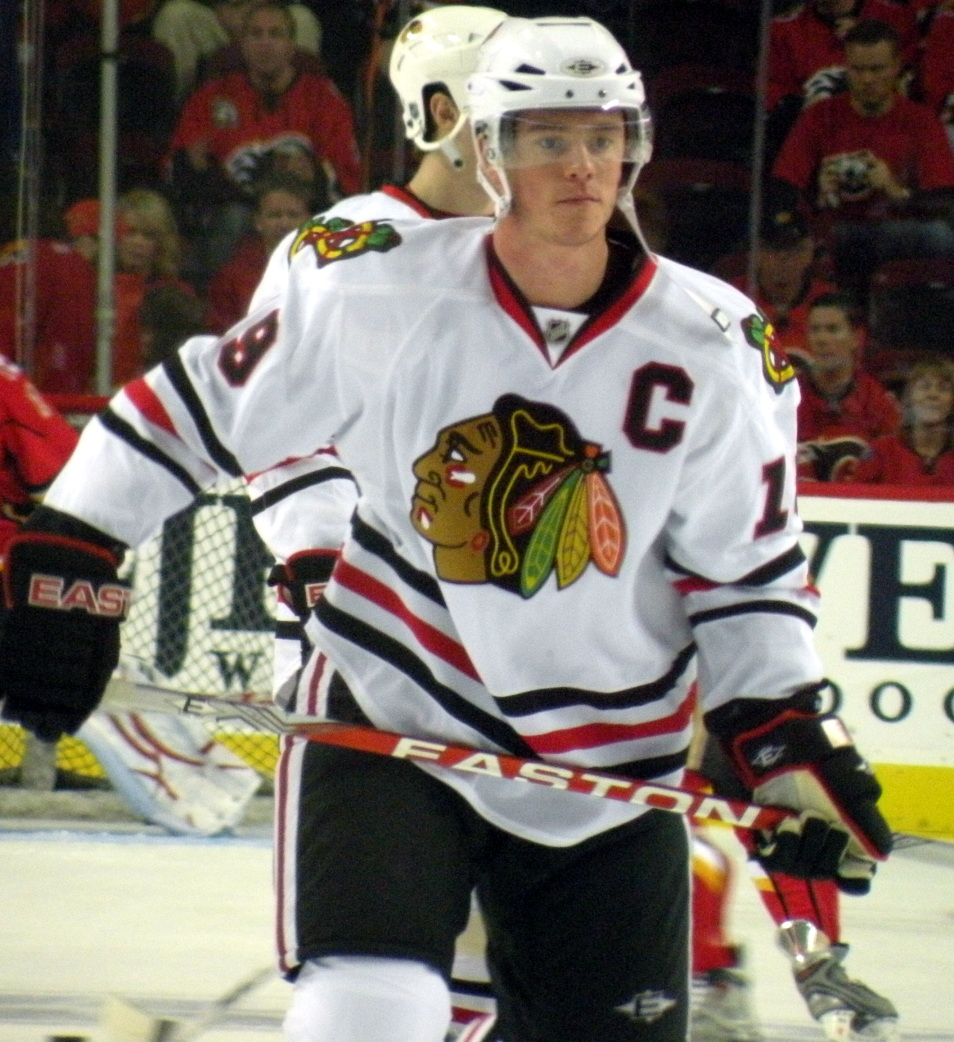
Jonathan Toews captained the Blackhawks to the first championship in 49 years

| # | Nat | Player | Position | Hand | Acquired | Place of birth | Finals appearance |
|---|---|---|---|---|---|---|---|
| 29 | (Canada) | Bryan Bickell | LW | L | 2004 | Bowmanville, Ontario | first |
| 36 | (Canada) | Dave Bolland | C | R | 2004 | Etobicoke, Ontario | first |
| 24 | (Canada) | Nick Boynton | D | R | 2010 | Nobleton, Ontario | first |
| 22 | (Canada) | Troy Brouwer | RW | R | 2004 | Vancouver, British Columbia | first |
| 37 | (United States) | Adam Burish | RW | R | 2002 | Madison, Wisconsin | first |
| 33 | (United States) | Dustin Byfuglien | LW | R | 2003 | Minneapolis, Minnesota | first |
| 51 | (Canada) | Brian Campbell | D | L | 2008 | Strathroy, Ontario | first |
| 55 | (Canada) | Ben Eager | LW | L | 2007 | Ottawa, Ontario | first |
| 46 | (Canada) | Colin Fraser | C | L | 2004 | Sicamous, British Columbia | first |
| 6 | (Canada) | Jordan Hendry | D | L | 2005 | Nokomis, Saskatchewan | first |
| 4 | (Sweden) | Niklas Hjalmarsson | D | L | 2005 | Eksjö, Sweden | first |
| 81 | (Slovakia) | Marian Hossa | RW | L | 2009 | Stara Ľubovna, Czechoslovakia | third (2008, 2009) |
| 39 | (France) | Cristobal Huet | G | L | 2008 | Saint-Martin-d'Hères, France | first |
| 88 | (United States) | Patrick Kane | RW | L | 2007 | Buffalo, New York | first |
| 2 | (Canada) | Duncan Keith – A | D | L | 2002 | Winnipeg, Manitoba | first |
| 82 | (Slovakia) | Tomas Kopecky | RW | L | 2009 | Ilava, Czechoslovakia | third (2008; did not play, 2009) |
| 16 | (Canada) | Andrew Ladd | LW | L | 2008 | Maple Ridge, British Columbia | second (2006) |
| 11 | (Canada) | John Madden | C | L | 2009 | Barrie, Ontario | fourth (2000, 2001, 2003) |
| 31 | (Finland) | Antti Niemi | G | L | 2008 | Vantaa, Finland | first |
| 7 | (Canada) | Brent Seabrook | D | R | 2003 | Richmond, British Columbia | first |
| 10 | (Canada) | Patrick Sharp – A | C | R | 2005 | Thunder Bay, Ontario | first |
| 5 | (Canada) | Brent Sopel | D | R | 2007 | Calgary, Alberta | first |
| 19 | (Canada) | Jonathan Toews – C | C | L | 2006 | Winnipeg, Manitoba | first |
| 32 | (Canada) | Kris Versteeg | LW | R | 2007 | Lethbridge, Alberta | first |

=== Philadelphia Flyers ===
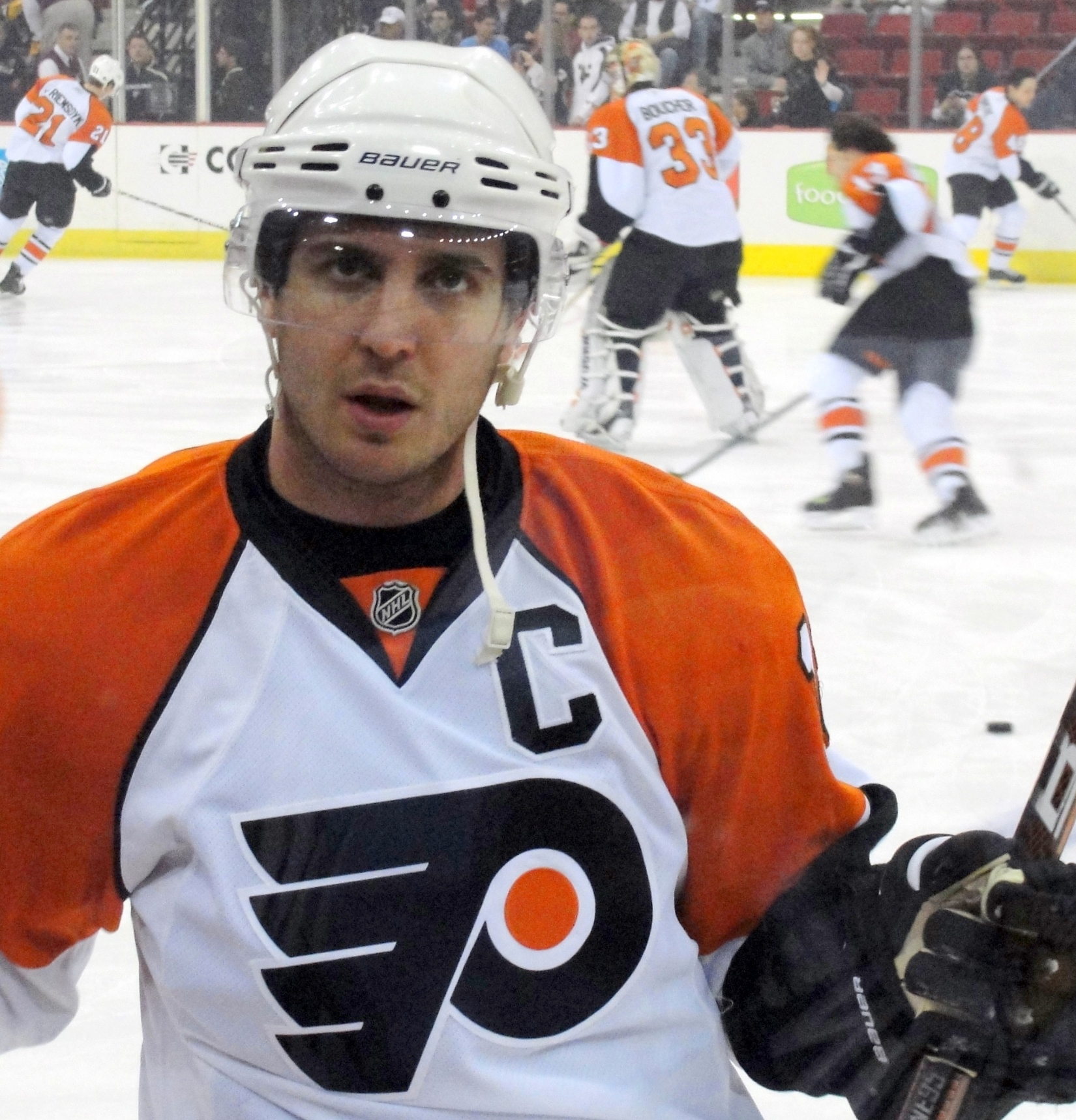
Mike Richards captained the Flyers to their first Stanley Cup Final appearance since 1997

| # | Nat | Player | Position | Hand | Acquired | Place of birth | Finals appearance |
|---|---|---|---|---|---|---|---|
| 45 | (Canada) | Arron Asham | RW | R | 2008 | Portage la Prairie, Manitoba | first |
| 3 | (Latvia) | Oskars Bartulis | D | L | 2005 | Ogre, Soviet Union | first |
| 11 | (Canada) | Blair Betts | C | L | 2009 | Edmonton, Alberta | first |
| 33 | (United States) | Brian Boucher | G | L | 2009 | Woonsocket, Rhode Island | first |
| 48 | (Canada) | Daniel Briere | C | R | 2007 | Gatineau, Quebec | first |
| 13 | (Canada) | Daniel Carcillo | LW | L | 2009 | King City, Ontario | first |
| 25 | (United States) | Matt Carle | D | L | 2008 | Anchorage, Alaska | first |
| 17 | (Canada) | Jeff Carter – A | C | R | 2003 | London, Ontario | first |
| 5 | (Canada) | Braydon Coburn | D | L | 2007 | Calgary, Alberta | first |
| 29 | (Canada) | Ray Emery | G | L | 2009 | Hamilton, Ontario | second (2007) |
| 12 | (Canada) | Simon Gagne | LW | L | 1998 | Sainte-Foy, Quebec | first |
| 28 | (Canada) | Claude Giroux | RW | R | 2006 | Hearst, Ontario | first |
| 19 | (Canada) | Scott Hartnell | LW | L | 2007 | Regina, Saskatchewan | first |
| 2 | (Czech Republic) | Lukas Krajicek | D | L | 2010 | Prostějov, Czechoslovakia | first |
| 14 | (Canada) | Ian Laperriere | RW | R | 2009 | Montreal, Quebec | first |
| 49 | (Canada) | Michael Leighton | G | L | 2009 | Petrolia, Ontario | first |
| 22 | (Finland) | Ville Leino | LW | L | 2010 | Savonlinna, Finland | second (2009) |
| 77 | (Canada) | Ryan Parent | D | L | 2007 | Prince Albert, Saskatchewan | first |
| 36 | (Canada) | Darroll Powe | C | L | 2008 | Kanata, Ontario | first |
| 20 | (Canada) | Chris Pronger – A | D | L | 2009 | Dryden, Ontario | third (2006, 2007) |
| 18 | (Canada) | Mike Richards – C | C | L | 2003 | Kenora, Ontario | first |
| 44 | (Finland) | Kimmo Timonen – A | D | L | 2007 | Kuopio, Finland | first |
| 21 | (United States) | James van Riemsdyk | LW | L | 2007 | Middletown, New Jersey | first |

== Stanley Cup engraving ==
The 2010 Stanley Cup was presented to Blackhawks captain Jonathan Toews by NHL Commissioner Gary Bettman following the Blackhawks' 4–3 overtime win over the Flyers in game six.

The following Blackhawks players and staff had their names engraved on the Stanley Cup

2009–10 Chicago Blackhawks

=== Players ===
Centres

- 10 Patrick Sharp* (A)
- 11 John Madden
- 19 Jonathan Toews (Captain)
- 36 Dave Bolland
- 46 Colin Fraser †

Wingers

- 16 Andrew Ladd
- 22 Troy Brouwer
- 32 Kris Versteeg
- 33 Dustin Byfuglien
- 37 Adam Burish*
- 55 Ben Eager
- 81 Marian Hossa
- 82 Tomas Kopecky
- 88 Patrick Kane

Defencemen

- 2 Duncan Keith (A)
- 4 Niklas Hjalmarsson
- 5 Brent Sopel
- 6 Jordan Hendry
- 7 Brent Seabrook
- 24 Nick Boynton
- 51 Brian Campbell

Goaltenders

- 31 Antti Niemi
- 39 Cristobal Huet
- * Played both centre and wing.
- † Did not play or dress in the Final.

=== Coaching and administrative staff ===
- W. Rockwell Rocky Wirtz (chairman/owner/governor), John McDonough (president), Jay Blunk (sr. vice president – business operations)
- Stan Bowman (general manager), Al MacIsaac (sr. director, hockey administration – assistant to the president)
- Kevin Cheveldayoff (assistant general manager), William Scotty Bowman (sr. advisor, hockey operations)
- Dale Tallon (assistant general manager), Joel Quenneville (head coach), Mike Haviland (assistant coach)
- John Torchetti (assistant coach), Stephane Waite (goaltending coach), Mike Gapski (athletic trainer), Troy Parchman (equipment manager)
- Jeff Thomas (assistant athletic trainer), Clint Reif (assistant equipment manager), Pawel Prylinski (massage therapist), Jim Heintzelman (equipment assistant)
- Paul Goodman (strength & conditioning coach), Paul Vincent (skating coach), Marc Bergevin (director – player personnel), crossed out name of Brad Aldrich (video coach)
- Mark Kelley (director – amateur scouting), Norm Maciver (director – player development), Michael Dumas (chief amateur scout), Ron Anderson (director – player recruitment)
- Tony Ommen (director – team service), Mark Bernard (general manager – minor league affiliations), Dr. Michael Terry (head team physician)
- Scotty Bowman won the Stanley Cup with his fourth team; Montreal, Pittsburgh, Detroit and Chicago. The only other people with wins with four teams are Jack Marshall, Harry Hap Holmes, Tommy Gorman and Al Arbour. This was also his 12th Stanley Cup win, tying him with Sam Pollock for second most times; only Jean Beliveau with his name on the Stanley Cup 17 times has more.

=== Engraving notes ===
- Brad Aldrich (Video Coach) was initially engraved on the Stanley Cup in 2010. Following a 2021 investigation into allegations that he sexually assaulted prospect Kyle Beach, among others, Aldrich's name was marked out with X's on the trophy by request of the team.
- #36 Dave Bolland, played 39 games in the regular season due to injury then played in every playoff game. Qualified to have name on Cup for playing every game in every round including all in the finals.
- #37 Adam Burish, only played 13 games in the regular season due to a preseason injury and played 15 in the playoffs, including the first three games in the finals. He qualified to have name engraved on Cup for playing in the finals.
- #46 Colin Fraser, played 70 games in the regular season and three games in the playoffs, (none in the finals, all three games were in round one). He qualified to have name on the Cup for meeting the minimum 41 regular season game requirement.
- Kris Versteeg's name was misspelled KRIS VERTSEEG with the "S" and "T" transposed. The engraver was able to correct the mistake.

=== Left off the Stanley Cup ===
- Chicago did not request an exemption to engrave the names of ten players who did not qualify (41 regular season games or one Finals game). Only Bryan Bickell played in the playoffs.

Included in team picture

- #29 Bryan Bickell, (LW) – played 16 regular season games and four playoff games for Chicago (three in the first round and one in the second round). The NHL refused Chicago's request to include Bickell's name on the Stanley Cup since he did not play in final two rounds of the playoffs and spent most of the regular season in the minors. Bickell played 65 regular season games for Rockford of the AHL. He was however, included in the team picture and got a personal day with the Stanley Cup over the summer.

Not in team picture

- #8 Kim Johnsson (D) – played 60 games, 52 for Minnesota and 8 for Chicago, missing the last 14 games and all the playoffs due a concussion late in the season. Chicago chose not to submit his name for engraving because he spent most of the season with Minnesota. Due his concussion, Johnsson never played in the NHL again.
- #20 Jack Skille (RW) – 6 regular season games, 63 for Rockford of the AHL
- #28 Jake Dowell (C) – 3 regular season games, 78 for Rockford of the AHL
- #50 Corey Crawford (G) – 1 regular season game, 43 for Rockford of the AHL
- #34 Jassen Cullimore (D) – 0 regular season games, 59 for Rockford of the AHL
- #30 Hannu Toivonen (G) – 0 regular season games, 26 for the Peoria Rivermen of the AHL, 5 for Rockford of the AHL
- #44 Danny Richmond (D) – 0 regular season games, 54 for Peoria of the AHL, 15 for Rockford of the AHL
- #42 Shawn Lalonde (D) – 0 regular season games, 58 for Belleville of the OHL, 8 for Rockford of the AHL
- #12 Kyle Beach (C) – 0 regular season games, 68 for Spokane of the WHL, 4 for Rockford of the AHL
- #56 Brian Connelly (D) – 0 regular season games, 78 for Rockford of the AHL
- Six Ambassadors were also included on the Official Stanley Cup Picture - Ab MacDonald, Denis Savard, Glenn Hall, Bobby Hull, Stan Mikita, Tony Esposito. - All 6 members along with 13 more scouts, and other players, and non-players were awarded Stanley Cup Rings.

| Preceded by Pittsburgh Penguins; 2009 | Chicago Blackhawks; Stanley Cup champions 2010 | Succeeded by Boston Bruins; 2011 |
