= Dustin Byfuglien =

American ice hockey player (born 1985)

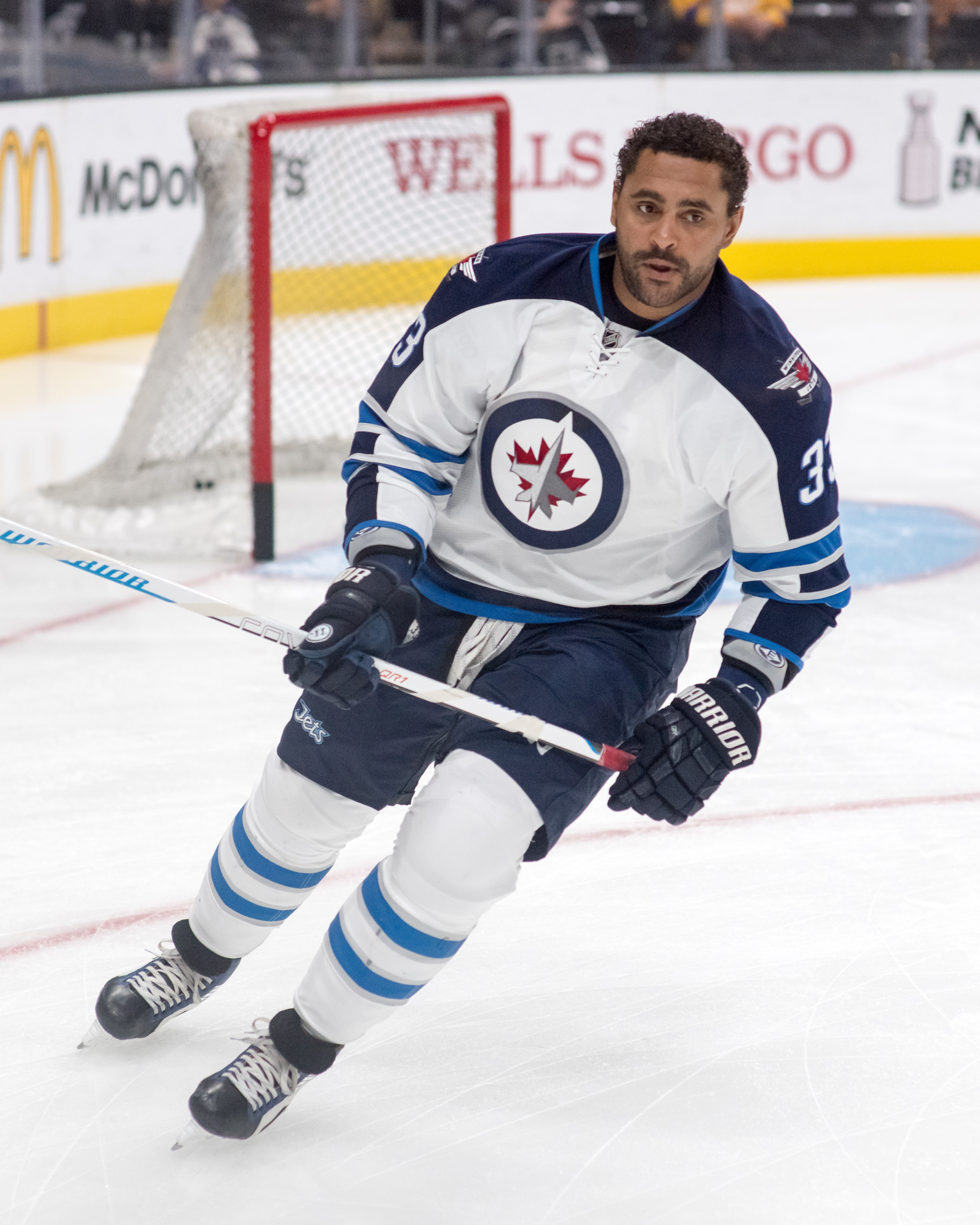
- Byfuglien with the Winnipeg Jets in April 2016
- Born: March 27, 1985 (age 41) Minneapolis, Minnesota, U.S.
- Height: 6 ft 5 in (196 cm)
- Weight: 260 lb (118 kg; 18 st 8 lb)
- Position: Defense / Right wing
- Shot: Right
- Played for: Chicago Blackhawks; Atlanta Thrashers; Winnipeg Jets
- NHL draft: 245th overall, 2003; Chicago Blackhawks
- Playing career: 2005–2019

Dustin Byfuglien (/ˈbʌflɪn/ BUFF-lin; born March 27, 1985), nicknamed "Big Buff", is an American former professional ice hockey player. He played for the Chicago Blackhawks, Atlanta Thrashers, and Winnipeg Jets. Drafted as a defenseman, he played both forward and defense in his career, though he generally played defense in his later seasons. Byfuglien helped Chicago win the Stanley Cup in 2010. Byfuglien was the first Black American-born player to win the Stanley Cup. Byfuglien became a professional fisherman after his hockey career.

== Early life ==
Byfuglien was born in Minneapolis, Minnesota, to Cheryl Byfuglien and Rick Spencer. His mother is of Norwegian and Swedish descent, and his father is African-American. Cheryl moved to Roseau, Minnesota, with Dustin to be closer to her family while Rick stayed in Minneapolis to continue college; the two never wed. In Roseau, Byfuglien was exposed to hockey and found an instant love for the sport, which soon turned into a calling. Byfuglien's stepfather, Dale Smedsmo, played four games in the NHL with the Toronto Maple Leafs in 1972, and 110 games in the World Hockey Association (WHA). Rick Spencer played college football for the St. Cloud State Huskies.

Byfuglien was academically ineligible to play hockey at Roseau High School. His family relocated to Warrenville, Illinois, a suburb of Chicago, to play AAA under-18 hockey for the Chicago Mission. He later moved to Canada and played for the Western Hockey League.

== Playing career ==
=== Chicago Blackhawks (2005–2010) ===
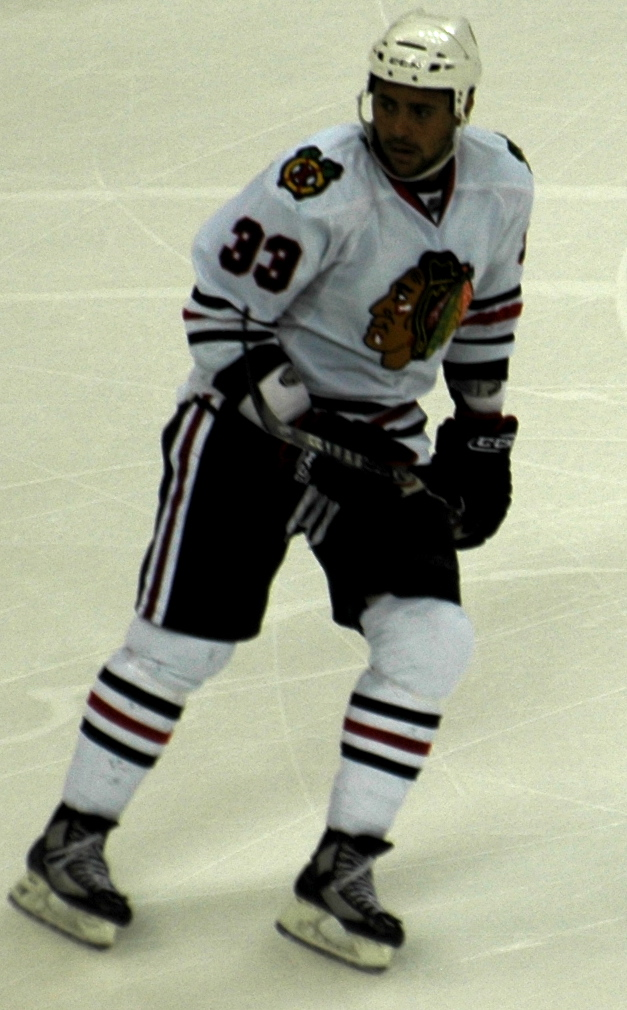
Byfuglien with the Blackhawks in April 2010

Byfuglien played major junior hockey for both the Brandon Wheat Kings and Prince George Cougars of the Western Hockey League (WHL). Byfuglien was drafted by the Chicago Blackhawks in 2003. Originally a defenseman at the start of the 2007–08 season, he was moved to a right wing position to give the team a larger body near the net.

He spent parts of his first two seasons with the Blackhawks' minor league team at the time, the Norfolk Admirals, and the Blackhawks.

He excelled in his third professional season, becoming the first Rockford IceHogs player to earn the American Hockey League's Player of the Week award, when he scored one goal and had five assists in four games. Byfuglien had seven points in eight games with Rockford before earning a recall on November 3, 2007, to the Chicago Blackhawks and never returned to the IceHogs. He had a goal in his first shift with the Blackhawks in the 2007–08 season on November 3 against the St. Louis Blues and recorded his first career hat-trick against the Phoenix Coyotes on November 30.

He finished tied for fifth on the team with 19 goals and 36 points in the 2009–10 season with the team, all while making a transition to forward throughout the campaign. He played a major role in the Blackhawks' Stanley Cup winning season in 2010, scoring 11 goals with five assists in the playoffs, including three goals in the Finals against the Philadelphia Flyers.

=== Atlanta Thrashers / Winnipeg Jets (2010–2020) ===
On June 24, 2010, Byfuglien was traded by Chicago, along with Brent Sopel, Ben Eager and Akim Aliu, to the Atlanta Thrashers for the New Jersey Devils' first (Kevin Hayes) and second-round pick in the 2010 NHL entry draft, Marty Reasoner, Joey Crabb and Jeremy Morin. The Thrashers moved Byfuglien back to his natural position of defense, although he had experience as a first-line and second-line winger with the Blackhawks, including the Blackhawks' run to the Stanley Cup in 2010. He became an alternate captain for the Thrashers after a few months into the 2010–11 season. Byfuglien was selected to his first All-Star Game, along with teammate Tobias Enström. In the 2011 All-Star Game's Skill Competition, his slap shot was clocked at 102.5 mph. On February 15, 2011, the Thrashers signed Byfuglien to a five-year, $26 million contract extension.

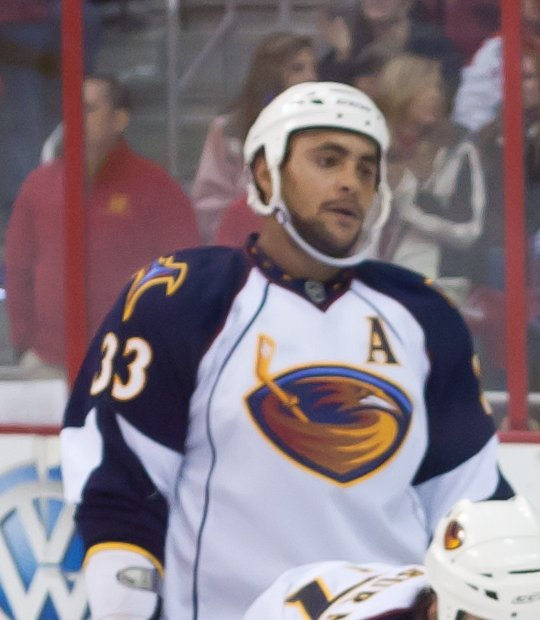
Byfuglien with the Thrashers in December 2010

He scored 12 goals along with 41 assists during the 2011–12 season that saw the Thrashers move to Winnipeg in the 2011 off-season. Byfuglien appeared in 66 games for the Jets that season and was again invited to the NHL All-Star Game.

Prior to the 2013–14 season, Byfuglien admitted he changed his fitness regime to work more on stickhandling and puck movement. That season, Byfuglien recorded 20 goals and 36 assists for a career high 56 points in 78 games.

After being moved back to his natural position, Byfuglien recorded 12 goals and 35 points in 48 games to start the 2014–15 season. As a result, he was invited to the 2015 NHL All-Star Game as the Jets sole representative. On April 2, 2015, Byfuglien was suspended four games for cross-checking New York Rangers forward J. T. Miller in the head during a March 31 game.

His All-Star streak continued into the following season, as he was invited to his fourth All-Star game. At the time of his selection, Byfuglien has amassed nine goals and 23 points through 40 games. On February 8, 2016, Byfuglien signed a five-year, $38 million contract extension with the Jets to remain with the team through the 2020–21 season, although at the time he told his agent, Ben Hankinson, that he didn't want a five-year deal.

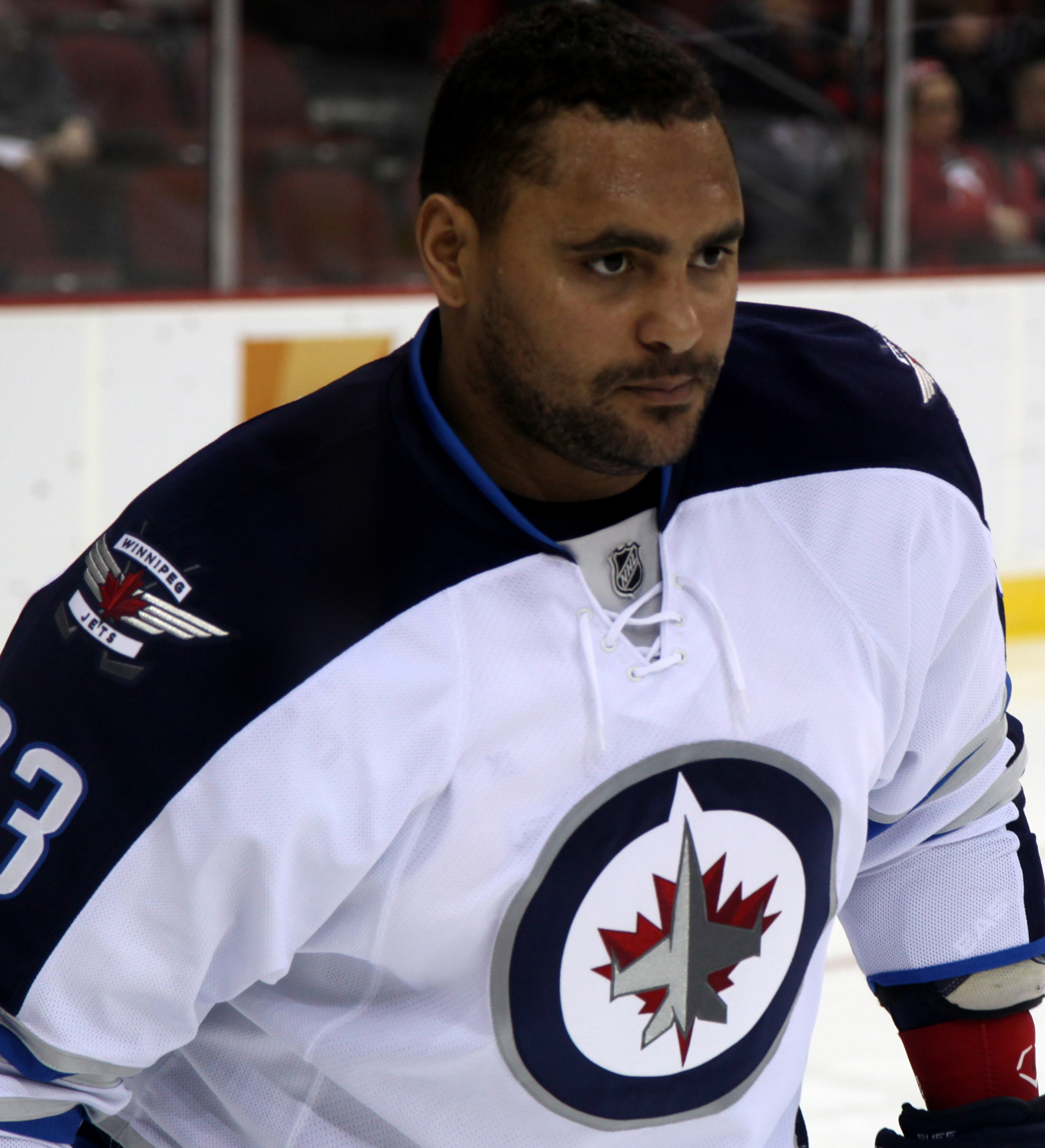
Byfuglien with the Jets in February 2013

On October 27, 2018, Byfuglien recorded his 500th NHL point in a 2–1 win over the Detroit Red Wings, becoming the 14th player drafted in the eighth round or later to hit 500 points. He suffered a lower-body injury in a 3–1 loss to the Minnesota Wild on December 27, 2018, and was expected to miss at least 10 games. Byfuglien eventually returned on February 7, 2019, after missing all of the month of January only to be re-injured again a week later with a lower body injury. Despite this setback, Byfuglien returned to the Jets lineup on March 30, 2019, and eventually ended the 2018–19 season by leading the team in penalty minutes with 69 and the Jets qualified for the 2019 playoffs, where he averaged over 25 minutes per game and recorded 8 points in 6 games.

On September 13, 2019, less than three weeks before the 2019–20 season started, he was granted an indefinite personal leave of absence by the Jets. However, he was later suspended by the Jets for not returning to training camp, though later reports indicated this was for salary cap relief. He underwent surgery for a high ankle sprain in late October 2019, without direct involvement of the team. On February 24, 2020, the Jets announced that Byfuglien would not return for the remainder of the season. On April 17, shortly into the COVID-19 pandemic, the Jets and Byfuglien mutually agreed to a contract termination, so he effectively walked away from the $14 million that he would have received by playing the last two years of his contract.

== Personal life ==
Byfuglien and his wife, Emily, have three children. All of the couple's children were born in Winnipeg.

Byfuglien is an avid fisherman, and competed in the 2011 Fort Frances Canadian Bass Championship on Rainy Lake. He embraced his passion for fishing after retiring from the NHL and became a pro fisher. Byfuglien and Mike Reid have finished in the top 30 of the Kenora Bass Invitational in both 2025 and 2026.

On August 31, 2011, Byfuglien was arrested on Lake Minnetonka and booked on suspicion of boating while intoxicated. Byfuglien pleaded guilty, and was sentenced to two days of community service on July 23, 2012.

== Career statistics ==
=== Regular season and playoffs ===
			Regular season					Playoffs
Season	Team	League	GP	G	A	Pts	PIM	GP	G	A	Pts	PIM
2000–01	Roseau High School	HS-MN						—	—	—	—	—
2001–02	Chicago Mission	MAHL	52	32	30	62	40	—	—	—	—	—
2001–02	Brandon Wheat Kings	WHL	3	0	0	0	0	—	—	—	—	—
2002–03	Brandon Wheat Kings	WHL	8	1	1	2	4	—	—	—	—	—
2002–03	Prince George Cougars	WHL	48	9	28	37	74	5	1	3	4	12
2003–04	Prince George Cougars	WHL	66	16	29	45	137	—	—	—	—	—
2004–05	Prince George Cougars	WHL	64	22	36	58	184	—	—	—	—	—
2005–06	Norfolk Admirals	AHL	53	8	15	23	75	4	1	2	3	4
2005–06	Chicago Blackhawks	NHL	25	3	2	5	24	—	—	—	—	—
2006–07	Norfolk Admirals	AHL	63	16	28	44	146	6	0	2	2	18
2006–07	Chicago Blackhawks	NHL	9	1	2	3	10	—	—	—	—	—
2007–08	Rockford IceHogs	AHL	8	2	5	7	25	—	—	—	—	—
2007–08	Chicago Blackhawks	NHL	67	19	17	36	59	—	—	—	—	—
2008–09	Chicago Blackhawks	NHL	77	15	16	31	81	17	3	6	9	26
2009–10	Chicago Blackhawks	NHL	82	17	17	34	94	22	11	5	16	20
2010–11	Atlanta Thrashers	NHL	81	20	33	53	93	—	—	—	—	—
2011–12	Winnipeg Jets	NHL	66	12	41	53	72	—	—	—	—	—
2012–13	Winnipeg Jets	NHL	43	8	20	28	34	—	—	—	—	—
2013–14	Winnipeg Jets	NHL	78	20	36	56	86	—	—	—	—	—
2014–15	Winnipeg Jets	NHL	69	18	27	45	124	4	0	1	1	4
2015–16	Winnipeg Jets	NHL	81	19	34	53	119	—	—	—	—	—
2016–17	Winnipeg Jets	NHL	80	13	39	52	117	—	—	—	—	—
2017–18	Winnipeg Jets	NHL	69	8	37	45	112	17	5	11	16	20
2018–19	Winnipeg Jets	NHL	42	4	27	31	69	6	2	6	8	4
NHL totals			869	177	348	525	1,094	66	21	29	50	74

=== International ===
Year	Team	Event	Result	GP	G	A	Pts	PIM
2016	United States	WCH	7th	2	0	1	1	2
Senior totals				2	0	1	1	2

== Awards and honors ==
Award	Year
AHL
All-Star Game	2007
Second All-Star Team	2007
NHL
Stanley Cup champion	2010
NHL All-Star Game	2011, 2012*, 2015, 2016

* injury prevented attendance

== See also ==
- List of family relations in the NHL
