= Tomáš Kopecký =

Slovak ice hockey player (born 1982)

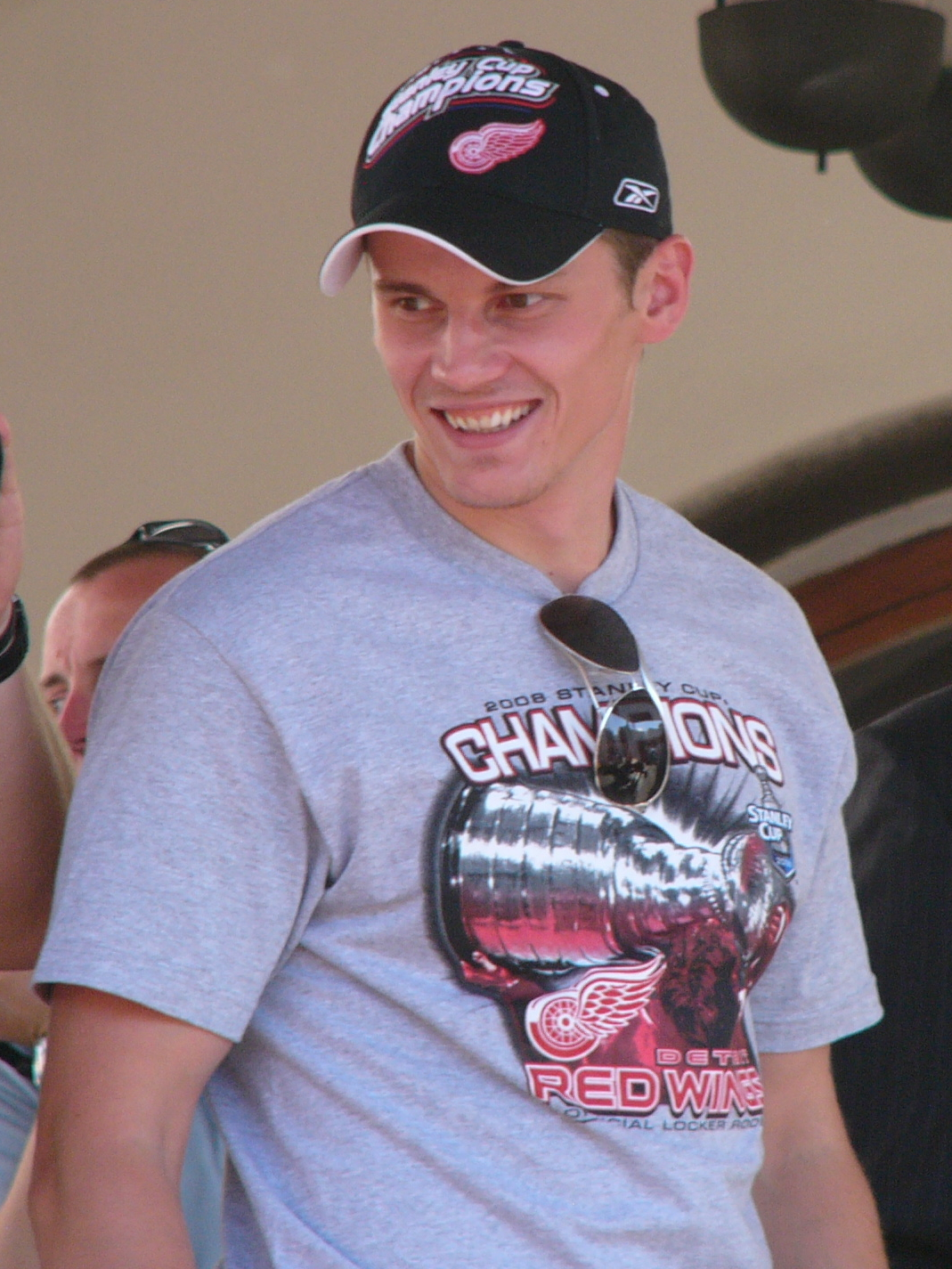
- Kopecký pictured in June 2008 during the Detroit Red Wings championship celebration
- Born: 5 February 1982 (age 44) Ilava, Czechoslovakia
- Height: 6 ft 3 in (191 cm)
- Weight: 209 lb (95 kg; 14 st 13 lb)
- Position: Forward
- Shot: Left
- Played for: HK Dukla Trenčín; Detroit Red Wings; Chicago Blackhawks; Florida Panthers; HC Oceláři Třinec; HC Slovan Bratislava
- National team: Slovakia
- NHL draft: 38th overall, 2000; Detroit Red Wings
- Playing career: 2001–2017

Tomáš Kopecký (Slovak pronunciation: [ˈtɔmaːʂ ˈkɔpetskiː]; born 5 February 1982) is a Slovak former professional ice hockey forward. He played in the National Hockey League with the Detroit Red Wings, Chicago Blackhawks and Florida Panthers.

He is a two-time Stanley Cup champion, having won with both the Red Wings in 2008 and the Blackhawks in 2010.

== Playing career ==
=== Professional ===
==== Detroit Red Wings (2005–2009) ====
After being drafted by the Detroit Red Wings in the 2000 NHL entry draft, Kopecký played two seasons of junior hockey with the Lethbridge Hurricanes of the Western Hockey League (WHL). He turned professional with the American Hockey League (AHL), initially with the Cincinnati Mighty Ducks before being assigned to the Grand Rapids Griffins.

Kopecký played four seasons with the Griffins before making his NHL debut with the Red Wings towards the end of 2005–06 on 28 February 2006 against the San Jose Sharks. This would be his only game played in the season for the Red Wings.

On 14 December 2006, in a game against the Chicago Blackhawks, Kopecký was injured a minute into the third period of the Red Wings' 3–2 victory. Kopecký lost his footing and hit the boards as he approached the Chicago blue line and Blackhawks defenseman Jim Vandermeer then fell on top of him. Kopecký was motionless on the ice for a few minutes before being helped to the dressing room by members of the Detroit training staff. He had surgery the next day to repair a broken clavicle. As a result of this injury, he was limited to just 26 games in the 2006–07 season. Kopecký had previously worn the number 28 with Detroit, but switched to 82 after the Red Wings acquired free agent defenseman Brian Rafalski.

On 3 April 2008, 77 games into the 2007–08 season, Kopecký tore his ACL during a game against the Columbus Blue Jackets resulting in him missing the last five games of the season and all of the post-season. This injury was repaired during surgery on 22 April. On 4 June 2008, he won the Stanley Cup with the Red Wings after the team defeated the Pittsburgh Penguins in six games in the 2008 Stanley Cup Final.

After Kopecký recorded six goals and 13 assists for 19 points in 79 games in the 2008–09 season, he and the Red Wings would go on to make a second consecutive appearance in Stanley Cup Final against the Pittsburgh Penguins where they would be defeated in seven games, one win short from a second consecutive Stanley Cup championship. He would play in eight playoff games in the 2009 playoffs (none in the Stanley Cup Finals) where he would be goalless and record one assist for one point.

==== Chicago Blackhawks (2009–2011) ====
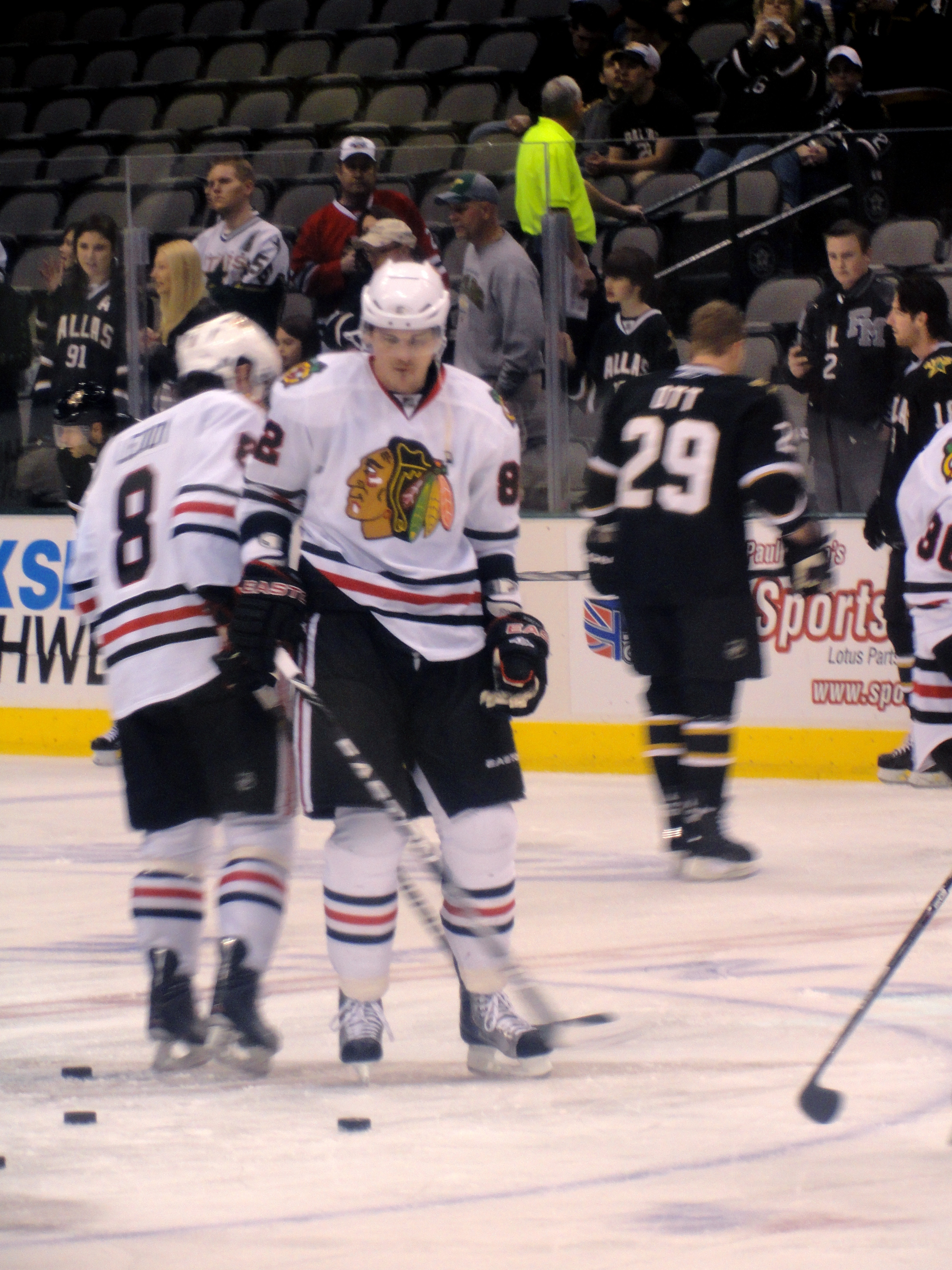
Kopecký (forefront) as a Blackhawk with teammate Nick Leddy in February 2011

On 1 July 2009, Kopecký signed a two-year deal with the Chicago Blackhawks worth $1.2 million per season. He played in 74 games for the Blackhawks in the 2009–10 season, posting 21 points (10 goals, 11 assists), 28 penalties-in-minutes (PIM), two game-winning goals and a shooting percentage of 10.5% while playing most of the season on the teams fourth line. Into the 2010 playoffs, Kopecký continued to be a regular starter on Chicago's third or fourth forward lines. He scored a crucial goal to put Chicago up by two in the Western Semifinals against the Vancouver Canucks, but his most crucial would be in his first game back in the lineup after being a healthy scratch for all four games of the sweep of the San Jose Sharks in the Western Conference Finals. Replacing injured forward Andrew Ladd, Kopecký netted the 6–5 game-winning goal in the game one victory of the 2010 Stanley Cup Final against the Philadelphia Flyers. Ladd returned the next game, but Blackhawks head coach Joel Quenneville kept Kopecký in the lineup to play every game of the six-game series against the Flyers as this series would be Kopecký's third consecutive Stanley Cup Finals with two different teams. He finished the playoffs with solid statistics; in 17 games, he tallied six points (four goals, two assists), 8 PIM, one game-winning goal and a shooting percentage of 14.3%. On 9 June 2010, at the age of 28, he won the Stanley Cup with the Blackhawks and hoisted the Cup for the second time in his life.

Kopecký entered the 2010–11 season in the last year of his contract with the newly-defending champion Blackhawks and ended the campaign with a breakout season. He opened the first game of the year on 7 October 2010 against the Colorado Avalanche on the team's first line with Jonathan Toews and Marián Hossa, putting in over twice the amount of time on the ice that he had averaged the season before until getting moved to the second line with Hossa and Patrick Sharp then eventually the fourth line with Viktor Stålberg and Ryan Johnson as the season went on. On 30 November, Kopecký recorded his first career four-point game in a 7–5 win over the St. Louis Blues having recorded the first goal of the game against Blues' goaltender and former Red Wings teammate Ty Conklin and recording assists on goals by Jonathan Toews, Patrick Kane and Patrick Sharp, respectively. On 26 December, in a 4–1 win against the Columbus Blue Jackets, in his 36th game of the year, Kopecký tallied his 21st point of the season with a goal on Blue Jackets goaltender Mathieu Garon, matching his career high total for a single season. Kopecký played in the Blackhawks' last game of the season on 10 April 2011, against his former team the Detroit Red Wings. The defending Stanley Cup champion Blackhawks desperately needed either a win in any fashion or an overtime/shootout loss to decisively clinch a playoff spot. A win would solidify a fifth seed finish while an overtime or shootout loss would result in a seventh seed finish. The Hawks lost the game 4–3 in regulation not gaining any points in the standings, but still clinched the eighth and final playoff spot due to a Dallas Stars 5–3 loss later that same day against the Minnesota Wild. If the Stars had won their finale against the Wild in regulation or overtime, the defending Stanley Cup champion Blackhawks would've missed the playoffs entirely by one point and it would've marked the first time in Kopecký's career to have been on a non-playoff team. Kopecký ended the season with career highs in games played (81), goals (15), assists (27) and points (42) and had now been on a playoff-bound team for six consecutive seasons as a result of the Blackhawks narrow playoff berth. Kopecký was taken out of game one of the first round of the 2011 playoffs on 13 April against the Presidents' Trophy-winning Vancouver Canucks with a concussion after being hit by Canucks defenseman Keith Ballard. He did not return to the ice for the rest of the series and the defending Stanley Cup champion Blackhawks ultimately lost the first-round matchup in seven games.

==== Florida Panthers (2011–2015) ====
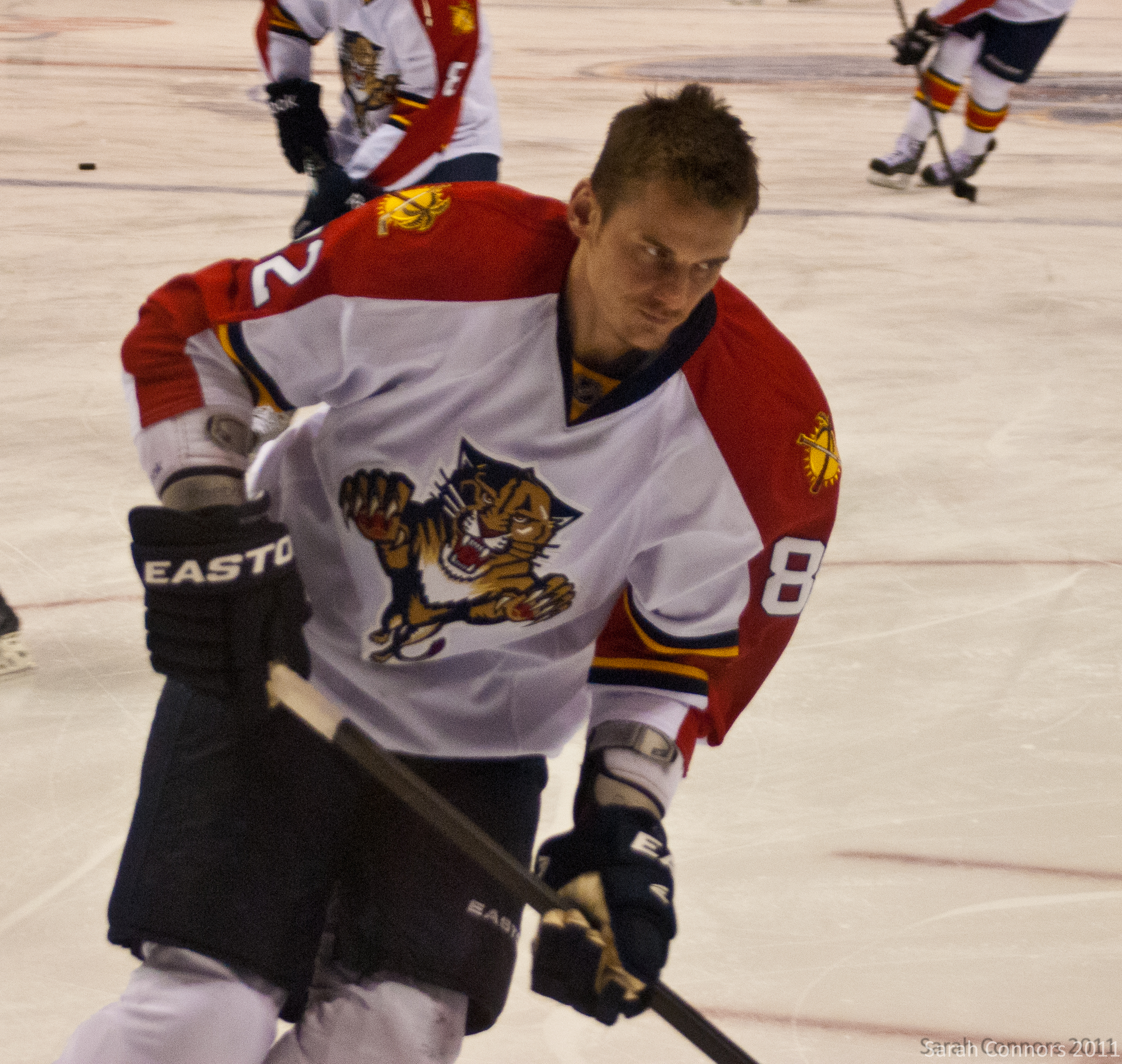
Kopecký as a member of the Florida Panthers in November 2011

Kopecký was poised to become an unrestricted free agent on 1 July 2011. However, on 27 June, the Blackhawks traded Kopecký to the Florida Panthers, who obtained the exclusive negotiating rights with the player until he was to become a free agent. In return, the Blackhawks received a seventh round draft pick in either the 2012 or 2013 NHL entry draft. Two days later, on 29 June, the Panthers signed Kopecký to a four-year deal worth a total of $12 million. On 31 December a day after a 4–1 loss to the New York Rangers, Kopecký and Rangers' defenseman Michael Del Zotto received $2,500 fines due to Kopecký sucker punching Del Zotto in a scuffle and Del Zotto for high sticking. Kopecký finished the 2011–12 season with 10 goals and 22 assists for 32 points in 80 games as the Panthers finished as the third seed in the Eastern Conference leading the Panthers qualifying for the playoffs for the first time since 2000. The Panthers would be defeated in the first round of the 2012 playoffs in seven games by the sixth seeded New Jersey Devils and Kopecký would record a goal and no assists for one point in all seven games.

The 48 game lockout-shortened 2012–13 season would see the Panthers not only fail to qualify for the playoffs but also finish last place in the entire NHL, resulting in Kopecký missing the playoffs for the first time in his career. Despite the team struggles, Kopecký continued to stay productive individually having finished the abbreviated season by recording 15 goals and 12 assists for 27 points in 47 games played.

On 29 December 2013, Kopecký played in his 500th NHL game in a 4–1 Panthers win over the Montreal Canadiens. On 15 February 2014, Kopecký suffered a concussion after being on the receiving end of a hit from Sabahudin Kovačevič in a game against Slovenia in the 2014 Winter Olympics resulting in him missing the rest of the Olympic tournament and the remainder of the 2013–14 season for the Panthers. Kopecký would end the injury-depleted season with four goals and eight assists for 12 points in 49 games as the Panthers would fail to qualify for the playoffs as they finished the season in second-to-last place in the NHL.

Kopecký would play 64 games in the 2014–15 season with two goals and six assists for eight points recorded. Despite his decrease in production and the Panthers failing to qualify for the playoffs once more, Kopecký would be the Panthers nominee for the Bill Masterton Memorial Trophy for perseverance and dedication to the game of hockey (although he wasn't named a top three finalist by the NHL).

=== Post NHL career ===
At the conclusion of his contract with the Panthers, and failing to meet the expectations of his contract the last two seasons of the deal, Kopecký went un-signed over the 2015 off-season as a free agent. On 22 October 2015, Kopecký returned to Europe and signed in the Czech Republic for the remainder of the season with HC Oceláři Třinec.

== Personal life ==
Kopecký is married to Maria, with whom he has two sons named Jakub (born 8 February 2004) and Tobias (born 20 February 2009).

== International play ==
Medal record

Representing Slovakia

Ice hockey

World Championships
Silver medal – second place	2012 Helsinki	

Kopecký has participated in eight international tournaments for Slovakia:

- 2000 World U18 Championships
- 2000 World Junior Championships
- 2001 World Junior Championships
- 2002 World Junior Championships
- 2010 Winter Olympics
- 2012 World Championship
- 2013 World Championship
- 2014 Winter Olympics
- 2015 World Championship

== Awards and achievements ==
- 2008 Stanley Cup Champion with the Detroit Red Wings
- 2010 Member of the Slovakia Winter Olympic Team
- 2010 Stanley Cup Champion with the Chicago Blackhawks
- 2012 World Championship Silver Medalist
- 2014 Member of the Slovakia Winter Olympic Team

== Career statistics ==
=== Regular season and playoffs ===
			Regular season					Playoffs
Season	Team	League	GP	G	A	Pts	PIM	GP	G	A	Pts	PIM
1997–98	Dukla Trenčín	SVK U20	41	19	22	41	76	—	—	—	—	—
1998–99	Dukla Trenčín	SVK U20	51	22	18	40	20	—	—	—	—	—
1999–2000	Dukla Trenčín	SVK U20	14	8	9	17	12	—	—	—	—	—
1999–2000	Dukla Trenčín	SVK	52	3	4	7	24	5	0	0	0	0
2000–01	Lethbridge Hurricanes	WHL	49	22	28	50	52	5	1	1	2	6
2000–01	Cincinnati Mighty Ducks	AHL	1	0	0	0	0	—	—	—	—	—
2001–02	Lethbridge Hurricanes	WHL	60	34	42	76	94	4	2	1	3	15
2001–02	Cincinnati Mighty Ducks	AHL	2	1	1	2	6	2	0	0	0	0
2002–03	Grand Rapids Griffins	AHL	70	17	21	38	32	14	0	0	0	6
2003–04	Grand Rapids Griffins	AHL	48	6	6	12	28	1	0	0	0	2
2004–05	Grand Rapids Griffins	AHL	48	8	8	16	35	—	—	—	—	—
2005–06	Detroit Red Wings	NHL	1	0	0	0	2	—	—	—	—	—
2005–06	Grand Rapids Griffins	AHL	77	32	40	72	123	16	3	4	7	25
2006–07	Detroit Red Wings	NHL	26	1	0	1	22	4	0	0	0	6
2007–08	Detroit Red Wings	NHL	77	5	7	12	43	—	—	—	—	—
2008–09	Detroit Red Wings	NHL	79	6	13	19	46	8	0	1	1	7
2009–10	Chicago Blackhawks	NHL	74	10	11	21	28	17	4	2	6	8
2010–11	Chicago Blackhawks	NHL	81	15	27	42	60	1	0	0	0	0
2011–12	Florida Panthers	NHL	80	10	22	32	32	7	1	0	1	4
2012–13	Dukla Trenčín	SVK	4	2	2	4	0	—	—	—	—	—
2012–13	Florida Panthers	NHL	47	15	12	27	28	—	—	—	—	—
2013–14	Florida Panthers	NHL	49	4	8	12	18	—	—	—	—	—
2014–15	Florida Panthers	NHL	64	2	6	8	28	—	—	—	—	—
2015–16	HC Oceláři Třinec	ELH	38	9	9	18	34	5	1	1	2	6
2016–17	HK Dukla Trenčín	SVK	5	0	2	2	4	—	—	—	—	—
2016–17	HC Slovan Bratislava	KHL	15	0	1	1	4	—	—	—	—	—
AHL totals			246	64	76	140	224	33	3	4	7	33
NHL totals			578	68	106	174	307	37	5	3	8	25

=== International ===
Year	Team	Event	Result	GP	G	A	Pts	PIM
2000	Slovakia	WJC18	5th	1	0	0	0	0
2000	Slovakia	WJC	9th	7	0	2	2	4
2001	Slovakia	WJC	8th	7	2	2	4	16
2002	Slovakia	WJC	8th	7	3	5	8	22
2010	Slovakia	OG	4th	7	1	0	1	2
2012	Slovakia	WC	2nd place, silver medalist(s)	10	5	1	6	4
2013	Slovakia	WC	8th	8	0	2	2	6
2014	Slovakia	OG	11th	2	0	0	0	0
2015	Slovakia	WC	9th	6	1	1	2	0
Junior totals				22	5	9	14	42
Senior totals				33	7	4	11	12
