= Kyle Beach =

Canadian ice hockey player (born 1990)

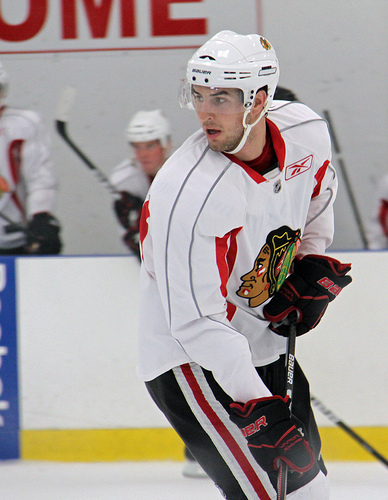
- Beach in training camp with the Chicago Blackhawks in September 2010
- Born: January 13, 1990 (age 36) North Vancouver, British Columbia, Canada
- Height: 6 ft 3 in (191 cm)
- Weight: 203 lb (92 kg; 14 st 7 lb)
- Position: Forward
- Shot: Right
- Played for: HV71; EC Red Bull Salzburg; Graz 99ers EC VSV; DVTK Jegesmedvék
- NHL draft: 11th overall, 2008; Chicago Blackhawks
- Playing career: 2009–2022

Kyle Beach (born January 14, 1990) is a Canadian former professional ice hockey player. Considered a top National Hockey League (NHL) prospect, he was selected by the Chicago Blackhawks in the first round of the 2008 NHL entry draft. Beach never played in the NHL, however, only spending time with minor league affiliates in the American Hockey League (AHL) from 2008 to 2014. In 2021, he sued the Blackhawks for alleged sexual assault by then-video coach Brad Aldrich in 2010, which he settled for an undisclosed amount.

== Playing career ==
Beach is a power forward who played a tough, physical game accompanied by offensive skill. After his first season in the Western Hockey League (WHL), he was named the league's Rookie of the Year. His aggressive play led to multiple concussions and a sports hernia while playing for the Everett Silvertips. After being named the 2006–07 WHL Rookie of the Year, Beach was projected to be a top five pick in the 2008 NHL entry draft. He was drafted 11th overall by the Chicago Blackhawks. Later in his WHL career, Beach bounced around, spending time with the Lethbridge Hurricanes and the Spokane Chiefs.

Beach made his professional debut with the Rockford IceHogs of the American Hockey League (AHL) at the end of the 2008–09 season. Until the start of the 2013–14 season, Beach had spent his entire professional career with the IceHogs. During the Blackhawks' 2010 Stanley Cup run, Beach was called up to the Blackhawks' practice squad. When HV71, of the Swedish Elite League ran into injury trouble, Beach joined the club for three weeks, appearing in seven games. On December 6, 2013, Beach was traded to the New York Rangers for Brandon Mashinter. He was assigned to the Rangers' AHL affiliate, the Hartford Wolf Pack, following the trade.

In August 2014, Beach signed a tryout contract with EC Salzburg through the end of September.

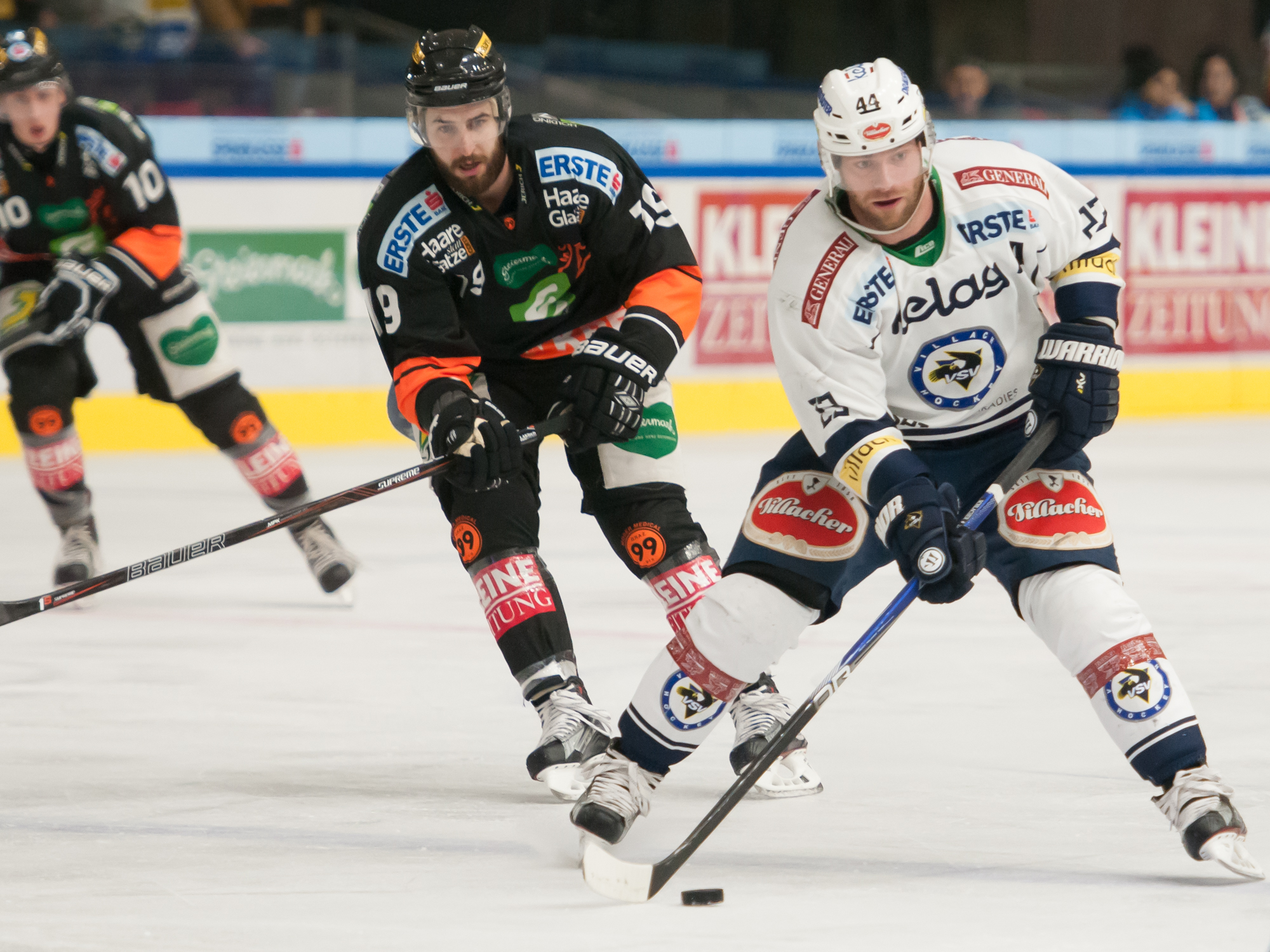
Beach (left) with the Graz 99ers in February 2016

After nine games with Salzburg in his second season with the club, Beach opted to terminate his contract and return to North America in signing a contract on November 25, 2015, with the Missouri Mavericks of the ECHL. After seven scoreless games with the club, Beach opted to rejoin the Austrian Hockey League with Graz 99ers on December 18, 2015.

In the 2016–17 season, Beach enjoyed his most productive season as a professional, compiling 30 goals and 45 points in 54 games with the 99ers. However, after a short playoff-run, his contract with the 99ers was not renewed, resulting in his release as a free agent.

On March 17, 2017, as a free agent, Beach continued his tenure in the EBEL, agreeing to a two-year contract with EC VSV.

On May 10, 2022, Beach announced his retirement.

== Personal life ==
His younger brother is NHL referee Cody Beach, who was born August 8, 1992. Cody was drafted by the St. Louis Blues in the 5th round of the 2010 NHL entry draft, and played as a prospect of the Blues in the American Hockey League with the Chicago Wolves. His cousin is Rich Harden, a former Major League Baseball pitcher. As a child, his favorite player was Jarome Iginla.

=== Sexual assault allegations against former Blackhawks video coach ===
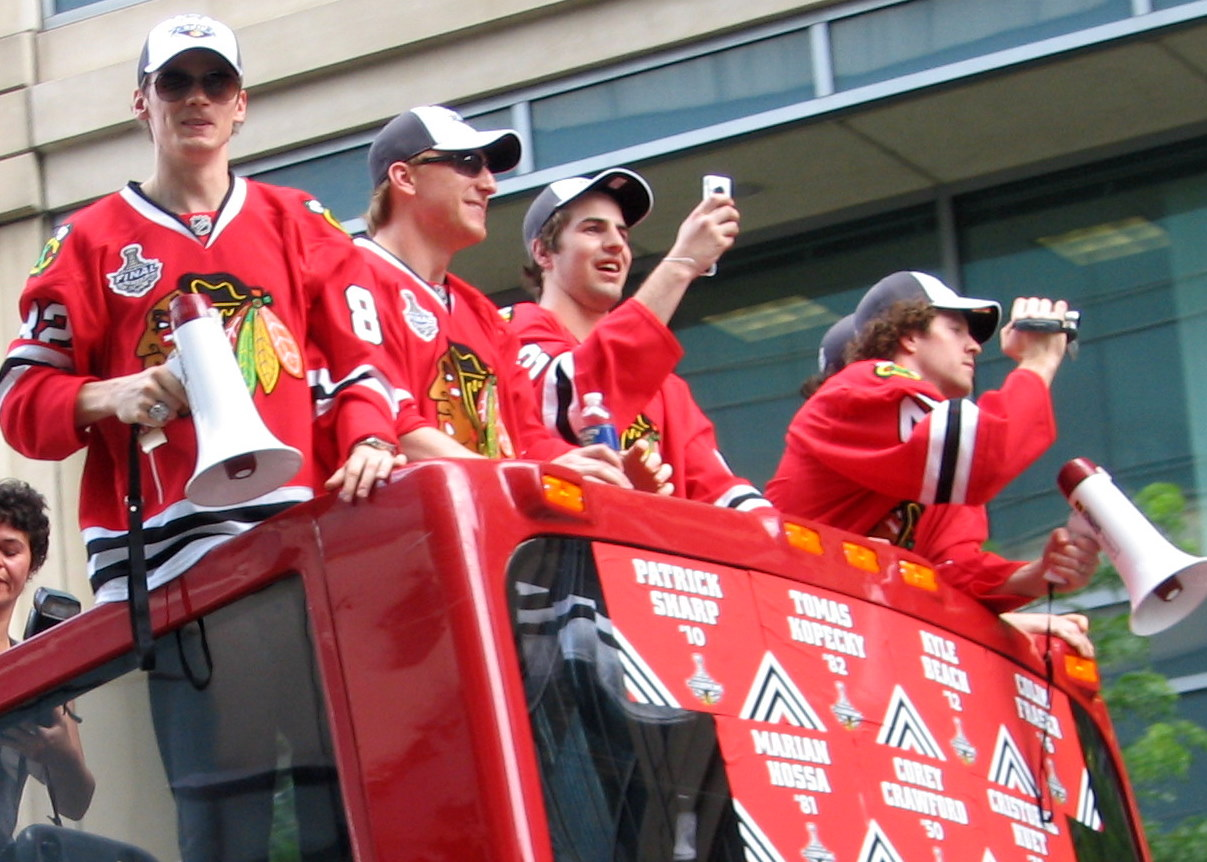
Beach, third from the left, celebrating with his teammates in Chicago after winning the 2010 Stanley Cup Finals.

On May 13, 2021, an unnamed former player filed a lawsuit alleging a prolonged sexual assault at the hands of then-video coach Brad Aldrich during an off-ice incident amidst the Chicago Blackhawks' 2010 Stanley Cup championship run. A subsequent investigation focused on two players, one of whom was referred to as "John Doe 1".

According to the investigation, on May 23, 2010, Blackhawks executives held a meeting about the sexual assault claims and decided they would not address them until after the Stanley Cup Playoffs. The matter was not discussed again, and on June 14, 2010, five days after Chicago won the Stanley Cup, the Blackhawks human resources director gave Aldrich the option to resign or face termination if John Doe 1's claims turned out to be true. Aldrich chose to resign and was permitted to participate in postseason celebrations, according to the investigation findings.

In October 2021, Beach gave an interview on SportsCentre confirming that he was John Doe 1, and spoke about his experiences with the Blackhawks organization after the fact. Since his interview confirming his identity as John Doe 1, he has received an outpouring of support all across the world for the bravery he has shown, including tweets in support from Hayley Wickenheiser, Aly Raisman, Adam van Koeverden, and Robin Lehner.

On November 23, 2021, Beach's attorney, Susan Loggans, confirmed that Beach and the Chicago Blackhawks would agree to mediation of the lawsuit via a mutually agreed upon third-party mediator, after Loggans’ court motion requesting that the lawsuit be allowed to progress to the discovery stage was denied by a judge. Mediation was held on December 15, 2021. Blackhawks and Beach reached an undisclosed settlement.

== Career statistics ==
=== Regular season and playoffs ===
			Regular season					Playoffs
Season	Team	League	GP	G	A	Pts	PIM	GP	G	A	Pts	PIM
2005–06	Everett Silvertips	WHL	4	2	1	3	4	9	1	3	4	31
2006–07	Everett Silvertips	WHL	65	29	32	61	196	11	5	6	11	19
2007–08	Everett Silvertips	WHL	60	27	33	60	222	4	0	0	0	4
2008–09	Everett Silvertips	WHL	30	9	21	30	106	—	—	—	—	—
2008–09	Lethbridge Hurricanes	WHL	24	15	18	33	59	10	1	1	2	31
2008–09	Rockford IceHogs	AHL	2	0	0	0	15	1	0	0	0	0
2009–10	Spokane Chiefs	WHL	68	52	34	86	186	7	7	2	9	19
2009–10	Rockford IceHogs	AHL	4	0	0	0	0	4	3	0	3	6
2010–11	Rockford IceHogs	AHL	71	16	20	36	163	—	—	—	—	—
2011–12	Rockford IceHogs	AHL	19	5	5	10	30	—	—	—	—	—
2012–13	Rockford IceHogs	AHL	66	16	10	26	204	—	—	—	—	—
2013–14	HV71	SHL	7	2	1	3	35	—	—	—	—	—
2013–14	Rockford IceHogs	AHL	7	4	0	4	10	—	—	—	—	—
2013–14	Hartford Wolf Pack	AHL	39	2	5	7	58	—	—	—	—	—
2014–15	EC Red Bull Salzburg	EBEL	53	12	13	25	109	13	10	3	13	31
2015–16	EC Red Bull Salzburg	EBEL	9	1	0	1	31	—	—	—	—	—
2015–16	Missouri Mavericks	ECHL	7	0	0	0	14	—	—	—	—	—
2015–16	Graz 99ers	EBEL	21	10	4	14	56	—	—	—	—	—
2016–17	Graz 99ers	EBEL	54	30	15	45	123	4	0	1	1	8
2017–18	EC VSV	EBEL	44	9	13	22	84	—	—	—	—	—
2018–19	Tölzer Löwen	DEL2	34	14	29	43	64	—	—	—	—	—
2019–20	DVTK Jegesmedvék	SVK	47	15	12	27	104	—	—	—	—	—
2020–21	TecArt Black Dragons	GerObL	36	31	29	60	48	—	—	—	—	—
2021–22	TecArt Black Dragons	GerObL	32	27	23	50	56	—	—	—	—	—
AHL totals			208	43	40	83	480	5	3	0	3	6
EBEL totals			181	62	45	107	403	17	10	4	14	39

=== International ===
Year	Team	Event	Result	GP	G	A	Pts	PIM
2007	Canada	IH18	4th	4	0	1	1	14
Junior totals				4	0	1	1	14

Awards and achievements
Preceded by Patrick Kane	Chicago Blackhawks first-round draft pick 2008	Succeeded by Dylan Olsen
