= Troy Brouwer =

Canadian ice hockey player (born 1985)

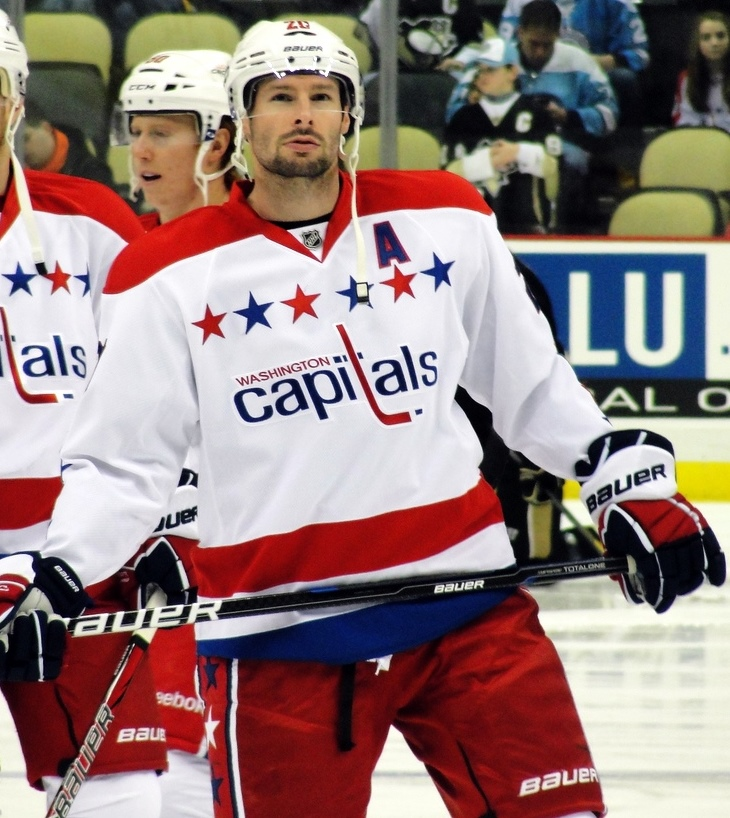
- Brouwer with the Washington Capitals in January 2012
- Born: August 17, 1985 (age 40) Vancouver, British Columbia, Canada
- Height: 6 ft 3 in (191 cm)
- Weight: 213 lb (97 kg; 15 st 3 lb)
- Position: Right wing
- Shot: Right
- Played for: Chicago Blackhawks; Washington Capitals; St. Louis Blues; Calgary Flames; Florida Panthers
- National team: Canada
- NHL draft: 214th overall, 2004; Chicago Blackhawks
- Playing career: 2006–2020

Troy Brouwer (born August 17, 1985) is a Canadian former professional ice hockey winger. He played for the Chicago Blackhawks, Washington Capitals, Calgary Flames, Florida Panthers and the St. Louis Blues of the National Hockey League (NHL). The Blackhawks selected him in the seventh round, 214th overall in the 2004 NHL entry draft.

He was a member of the Stanley Cup-winning Blackhawks in 2010.

== Playing career ==
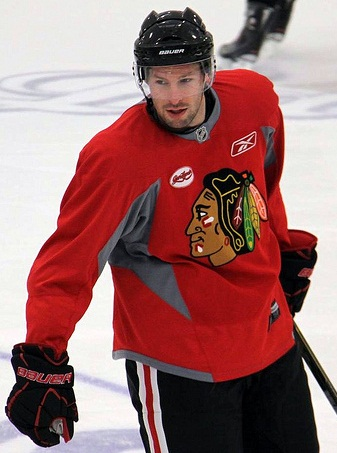
Brouwer practicing with the Blackhawks in January 2011

=== Early career ===
Brouwer was educated at North Delta Secondary School. He was drafted 214th overall in the 2004 NHL entry draft by the Chicago Blackhawks. Brouwer spent his major junior career in the Western Hockey League (WHL) with the Moose Jaw Warriors. In his final year with the Warriors in 2005–06, he was named team captain and led Moose Jaw with a team-high 49 goals and 53 assists. Brouwer's 102 points also led the league in points, by which he was awarded the Bob Clarke Trophy.

=== Professional ===
==== Chicago Blackhawks ====
Brouwer was assigned to the Norfolk Admirals, the Blackhawks' American Hockey League (AHL) affiliate in 2006–07, where he recorded 79 points and was named to the AHL All-Rookie and Second All-Star Team. He also made his NHL debut that season, playing 10 games with the Blackhawks. As a Blackhawk, Brouwer joined three of his previous minor hockey teammates, Colin Fraser, Brent Seabrook and Andrew Ladd from his Vancouver team, the Pacific Vipers.

In the 2007–08 season, Brouwer was again in the AHL with the Rockford IceHogs, Chicago's newly assigned AHL affiliate. Although his production dropped to 54 points in 75 games, he scored a franchise-record 25 power play goals, just two shy of the league record. Recalled by the Blackhawks for a short two-game stint, Brouwer recorded his first NHL point, an assist on March 23, 2008, against the St. Louis Blues.

The 2009–10 season saw a huge improvement in Brouwer's performance, where he scored 22 goals and 40 points in 78 games that season as the Blackhawks finished as the second seed in the West and third in the league overall. In the 2010 playoffs, Brouwer played in four goals and assists for eight points in 19 games for the Blackhawks as the Blackhawks defeated the seventh-seeded Nashville Predators in six games, the third-seeded Vancouver Canucks in six games for the second consecutive year and swept the top-seeded San Jose Sharks in the first three rounds before the Blackhawks defeated the seventh-seeded Philadelphia Flyers in six games the 2010 Stanley Cup Finals.

On April 5, 2011, in a 2–1 OT loss against the Montreal Canadiens, Brouwer suffered a shoulder injury when he unsuccessfully tried to deliver a check to Canadiens' forward Lars Eller, resulting in Brouwer leaving the game and missing the final three games. Prior to his injury, Brouwer continued to put up decent numbers for the Blackhawks despite being tenth in scoring on the team as he ended with 17 goals and 19 assists for 36 points in the first 79 games of the 2010–11 season as the defending Stanley Cup champion Blackhawks barely qualified for the playoffs as the eighth and final seed. Despite not being fully healed, Brouwer returned in time for the start of the playoffs. In the opening round of the 2011 playoffs, the Blackhawks would fall in seven games to the Presidents' Trophy-winning Vancouver Canucks and Brouwer would finish the series pointless in all seven games. After the Blackhawks elimination, it was revealed that Brouwer suffered a torn labrum sometime in the previous 2009–10 Stanley Cup-winning season and had been playing through it the entire 2010–11 season and it was aggravated in the game against the Canadiens and underwent surgery to repair the injury.

==== Washington Capitals ====
On June 24, 2011, Brouwer was traded to the Washington Capitals for Washington's first round pick in the 2011 NHL entry draft. On July 6, Brouwer signed a two-year, $4.7 million contract with the Capitals.

During the 2011–12 season, on January 13, 2012, he recorded his first NHL hat trick against the Tampa Bay Lightning.

On September 12, 2012, the Capitals signed Brouwer to a three-year, $11 million contract extension worth $3,666,667 annually.

==== St. Louis Blues ====
On July 2, 2015, the Capitals traded Brouwer to the St. Louis Blues along with Pheonix Copley and a 2016 3rd-round draft pick in exchange for T. J. Oshie. He elevated his play for the Blues in 20 playoff games as the Blues reached the Western Conference Finals. Brouwer scored eight goals during the postseason, including the game-winning goal in Game 7 of Round One against his former team, the defending Stanley Cup champion Chicago Blackhawks on goaltender and former Blackhawk teammate Corey Crawford.

==== Calgary Flames ====
At the conclusion of his contract with the Blues, Brouwer signed as a free agent to a four-year, $18 million contract with the Calgary Flames on July 1, 2016. Prior to the beginning of the season, Brouwer was named one of the team's alternate captains. In his first season with the club, Brouwer’s performance declined heavily, and he only managed to record 25 points in 74 games.

During the 2017-18 season, Brouwer’s performance hit an even bigger decline, recording a career low 6 goals and 22 points in 76 games. Brouwer did not record a single goal until December 4, 2017 against the Philadelphia Flyers. For only the second time in his NHL career, Brouwer did not qualify for the playoffs. On August 3, 2018, the Flames bought out the final two years of Brouwer's contract, making him an unrestricted free agent.

==== Florida Panthers ====
On August 27, 2018, the Florida Panthers signed Brouwer to a one-year, $800,000 contract. In a checking-line role with the Panthers, Brouwer recorded 21 points in 75 games.

On September 4, 2019, as an unsigned free agent over the summer, Brouwer agreed to attend the Panthers' training camp on a professional tryout. After completing his second training camp with the Panthers he was released from his professional tryout during the pre-season on September 25.

==== Return to St. Louis ====
On November 11, 2019, Brouwer (alongside former Panthers teammate Jamie McGinn) was signed to a professional tryout by the Blues. On November 20, the Blues signed Brouwer to a one-year, two-way contract for the remainder of the 2019-20 season.

==== Retirement ====
On November 18, 2021, Brouwer announced his retirement from professional hockey.

== Career statistics ==
=== Regular season and playoffs ===
			Regular season					Playoffs
Season	Team	League	GP	G	A	Pts	PIM	GP	G	A	Pts	PIM
2001–02	Delta Ice Hawks	PJHL	30	21	18	39	130	—	—	—	—	—
2001–02	Moose Jaw Warriors	WHL	13	0	0	0	7	—	—	—	—	—
2002–03	Moose Jaw Warriors	WHL	59	9	12	21	54	13	1	2	3	14
2003–04	Moose Jaw Warriors	WHL	72	23	26	49	111	10	3	0	3	12
2004–05	Moose Jaw Warriors	WHL	71	22	25	47	132	5	1	2	3	8
2005–06	Moose Jaw Warriors	WHL	72	49	53	102	122	17	10	4	14	34
2006–07	Norfolk Admirals	AHL	66	41	38	79	70	6	1	0	1	4
2006–07	Chicago Blackhawks	NHL	10	0	0	0	7	—	—	—	—	—
2007–08	Rockford IceHogs	AHL	75	35	19	54	154	12	5	4	9	16
2007–08	Chicago Blackhawks	NHL	2	0	1	1	0	—	—	—	—	—
2008–09	Rockford IceHogs	AHL	5	2	6	8	20	—	—	—	—	—
2008–09	Chicago Blackhawks	NHL	69	10	16	26	50	17	0	2	2	12
2009–10	Chicago Blackhawks	NHL	78	22	18	40	66	19	4	4	8	8
2010–11	Chicago Blackhawks	NHL	79	17	19	36	38	7	0	0	0	11
2011–12	Washington Capitals	NHL	82	18	15	33	61	14	2	2	4	8
2012–13	Washington Capitals	NHL	47	19	14	33	28	7	1	1	2	10
2013–14	Washington Capitals	NHL	82	25	18	43	92	—	—	—	—	—
2014–15	Washington Capitals	NHL	82	21	22	43	53	14	0	3	3	10
2015–16	St. Louis Blues	NHL	82	18	21	39	62	20	8	5	13	26
2016–17	Calgary Flames	NHL	74	13	12	25	31	4	0	2	2	0
2017–18	Calgary Flames	NHL	76	6	16	22	53	—	—	—	—	—
2018–19	Florida Panthers	NHL	75	12	9	21	47	—	—	—	—	—
2019–20	St. Louis Blues	NHL	13	1	0	1	7	4	1	0	1	4
NHL totals			851	182	181	363	595	106	16	19	35	89

=== International ===
Year	Team	Event	Result	GP	G	A	Pts	PIM
2014	Canada	WC	5th	8	0	1	1	4
Senior totals				8	0	1	1	4

== Awards and honours ==
Award	Year
WHL
East First All-Star Team	2006
Bob Clarke Trophy	2006
AHL
All-Rookie Team	2007
Second All-Star Team	2007
All-Star Game	2007
NHL
Stanley Cup	2010

Awards
Preceded by Eric Fehr	Winner of the Bob Clarke Trophy; 2006	Succeeded by Zach Hamill
