= 2006–07 NHL transactions =

The following is a list of all team-to-team transactions that occurred in the National Hockey League during the 2006–07 NHL season. It lists, by date, the team each player has been traded to, signed by, or claimed by, and for which players or draft picks, if applicable.

The 2006–07 NHL trade deadline was on February 27, 2007. Players traded or claimed off waivers after that date were not be eligible to play in the 2007 Stanley Cup playoffs.

== Free agency ==
Note: This does not include players who have re-signed with their previous team as an unrestricted free agent or as a restricted free agent.

Date	Player	New team	Previous team
July 1, 2006	Pavel Kubina	Toronto Maple Leafs	Tampa Bay Lightning
July 1, 2006	Hal Gill	Toronto Maple Leafs	Boston Bruins
July 1, 2006	Andy Delmore	Tampa Bay Lightning	Columbus Blue Jackets
July 1, 2006	John Grahame	Carolina Hurricanes	Tampa Bay Lightning
July 1, 2006	Marc Savard	Boston Bruins	Atlanta Thrashers
July 1, 2006	Zdeno Chara	Boston Bruins	Ottawa Senators
July 1, 2006	Ed Jovanovski	Phoenix Coyotes	Vancouver Canucks
July 1, 2006	Brian Pothier	Washington Capitals	Ottawa Senators
July 1, 2006	Matt Cullen	New York Rangers	Carolina Hurricanes
July 1, 2006	Tyler Arnason	Colorado Avalanche	Ottawa Senators
July 1, 2006	Nolan Baumgartner	Philadelphia Flyers	Vancouver Canucks
July 1, 2006	Willie Mitchell	Vancouver Canucks	Dallas Stars
July 1, 2006	Andrei Zyuzin	Calgary Flames	Minnesota Wild
July 1, 2006	Joe Corvo	Ottawa Senators	Los Angeles Kings
July 1, 2006	Martin Gerber	Ottawa Senators	Carolina Hurricanes
July 1, 2006	Johan Hedberg	Atlanta Thrashers	Dallas Stars
July 1, 2006	Rob Blake	Los Angeles Kings	Colorado Avalanche
July 1, 2006	Kim Johnsson	Minnesota Wild	Philadelphia Flyers
July 1, 2006	Keith Carney	Minnesota Wild	Vancouver Canucks
July 1, 2006	Mark Parrish	Minnesota Wild	Los Angeles Kings
July 1, 2006	Jay McKee	St. Louis Blues	Buffalo Sabres
July 1, 2006	Filip Kuba	Tampa Bay Lightning	Minnesota Wild
July 1, 2006	Patrick Lalime	Chicago Blackhawks	St. Louis Blues
July 1, 2006	Scott Thornton	Los Angeles Kings	San Jose Sharks
July 2, 2006	Jason Arnott	Nashville Predators	Dallas Stars
July 2, 2006	Mike Sillinger	New York Islanders	Nashville Predators
July 2, 2006	Mike Morrison	Phoenix Coyotes	Ottawa Senators
July 2, 2006	Alyn McCauley	Los Angeles Kings	San Jose Sharks
July 2, 2006	Shean Donovan	Boston Bruins	Calgary Flames
July 2, 2006	Ruslan Salei	Florida Panthers	Anaheim Ducks
July 2, 2006	Doug Weight	St. Louis Blues	Carolina Hurricanes
July 3, 2006	Dan Hinote	St. Louis Blues	Colorado Avalanche
July 3, 2006	Mark Eaton	Pittsburgh Penguins	Nashville Predators
July 3, 2006	Bill Guerin	St. Louis Blues	Dallas Stars
July 3, 2006	Curtis Brown	San Jose Sharks	Chicago Blackhawks
July 3, 2006	Aaron Ward	New York Rangers	Carolina Hurricanes
July 3, 2006	Mike Grier	San Jose Sharks	Buffalo Sabres
July 3, 2006	Glen Metropolit	Atlanta Thrashers	Ottawa Senators
July 3, 2006	Steve Rucchin	Atlanta Thrashers	New York Rangers
July 3, 2006	Brendan Witt	New York Islanders	Nashville Predators
July 4, 2006	Marty Reasoner	Edmonton Oilers	Boston Bruins
July 4, 2006	Andy Hilbert	New York Islanders	Pittsburgh Penguins
July 4, 2006	Randy Robitaille	Philadelphia Flyers	Minnesota Wild
July 4, 2006	Brian Willsie	Los Angeles Kings	Washington Capitals
July 4, 2006	Darren Haydar	Atlanta Thrashers	Nashville Predators
July 4, 2006	Jeremy Roenick	Phoenix Coyotes	Los Angeles Kings
July 4, 2006	Jarkko Ruutu	Pittsburgh Penguins	Vancouver Canucks
July 5, 2006	Jeff Halpern	Dallas Stars	Washington Capitals
July 5, 2006	Matthew Barnaby	Dallas Stars	Chicago Blackhawks
July 5, 2006	Jeff Friesen	Calgary Flames	Anaheim Ducks
July 5, 2006	Jaroslav Spacek	Buffalo Sabres	Edmonton Oilers
July 5, 2006	Georges Laraque	Phoenix Coyotes	Edmonton Oilers
July 5, 2006	Mark Cullen	Philadelphia Flyers	Chicago Blackhawks
July 6, 2006	Jamie McLennan	Calgary Flames	Florida Panthers
July 6, 2006	Daniel Tjarnqvist	Edmonton Oilers	Minnesota Wild
July 6, 2006	Tomas Kloucek	Columbus Blue Jackets	Atlanta Thrashers
July 6, 2006	Ty Conklin	Columbus Blue Jackets	Edmonton Oilers
July 6, 2006	Mark Mowers	Boston Bruins	Detroit Red Wings
July 6, 2006	Branko Radivojevic	Minnesota Wild	Philadelphia Flyers
July 6, 2006	Doug Janik	Tampa Bay Lightning	Buffalo Sabres
July 6, 2006	Trevor Letowski	Carolina Hurricanes	Columbus Blue Jackets
July 6, 2006	Denis Arkhipov	Chicago Blackhawks	Nashville Predators
July 8, 2006	Tom Poti	New York Islanders	New York Rangers
July 9, 2006	Brendan Shanahan	New York Rangers	Detroit Red Wings
July 10, 2006	Mathieu Darche	San Jose Sharks	Nashville Predators
July 10, 2006	Patrick Traverse	San Jose Sharks	Dallas Stars
July 10, 2006	Kevin Dallman	Los Angeles Kings	St. Louis Blues
July 10, 2006	Michael Rupp	New Jersey Devils	Phoenix Coyotes
July 11, 2006	Chris Simon	New York Islanders	Calgary Flames
July 11, 2006	Luke Richardson	Tampa Bay Lightning	Toronto Maple Leafs
July 12, 2006	Sergei Samsonov	Montreal Canadiens	Edmonton Oilers
July 12, 2006	Matt Murley	Colorado Avalanche	Pittsburgh Penguins
July 12, 2006	Ben Guite	Colorado Avalanche	Boston Bruins
July 12, 2006	Mark Rycroft	Colorado Avalanche	St. Louis Blues
July 13, 2006	Dan Jancevski	Montreal Canadiens	Dallas Stars
July 13, 2006	Erik Westrum	Toronto Maple Leafs	Minnesota Wild
July 13, 2006	Michael Leighton	Anaheim Ducks	Buffalo Sabres
July 13, 2006	Matt Hussey	Detroit Red Wings	Pittsburgh Penguins
July 13, 2006	Dan Smith	Detroit Red Wings	Edmonton Oilers
July 13, 2006	Raitis Ivanans	Los Angeles Kings	Montreal Canadiens
July 13, 2006	Martin Grenier	Philadelphia Flyers	New York Rangers
July 13, 2006	Boyd Kane	Philadelphia Flyers	Washington Capitals
July 14, 2006	Jon Sim	Atlanta Thrashers	Florida Panthers
July 14, 2006	Donald Brashear	Washington Capitals	Philadelphia Flyers
July 14, 2006	Graham Mink	San Jose Sharks	Washington Capitals
July 14, 2006	Scott Ferguson	San Jose Sharks	Minnesota Wild
July 14, 2006	Shawn Thornton	Anaheim Ducks	Chicago Blackhawks
July 15, 2006	Eric Healey	Tampa Bay Lightning	Boston Bruins
July 17, 2006	Eric Lindros	Dallas Stars	Toronto Maple Leafs
July 17, 2006	Don MacLean	Phoenix Coyotes	Detroit Red Wings
July 17, 2006	David Koci	Chicago Blackhawks	Pittsburgh Penguins
July 18, 2006	Michael Peca	Toronto Maple Leafs	Edmonton Oilers
July 19, 2006	Geoff Sanderson	Philadelphia Flyers	Phoenix Coyotes
July 19, 2006	Bryan Helmer	Phoenix Coyotes	Detroit Red Wings
July 19, 2006	Wyatt Smith	Minnesota Wild	New York Islanders
July 20, 2006	Rick Berry	New York Islanders	Nashville Predators
July 20, 2006	Marc Chouinard	Vancouver Canucks	Minnesota Wild
July 21, 2006	Wade Brookbank	Boston Bruins	Vancouver Canucks
July 21, 2006	Jeff Hoggan	Boston Bruins	St. Louis Blues
July 21, 2006	Tim Conboy	Carolina Hurricanes	San Jose Sharks
July 21, 2006	Ramzi Abid	Nashville Predators	Atlanta Thrashers
July 23, 2006	Matt Carkner	Pittsburgh Penguins	San Jose Sharks
July 24, 2006	Ronald Petrovicky	Pittsburgh Penguins	Atlanta Thrashers
July 24, 2006	Ken Klee	Colorado Avalanche	New Jersey Devils
July 25, 2006	Mark Recchi	Pittsburgh Penguins	Carolina Hurricanes
July 25, 2006	Ed Belfour	Florida Panthers	Toronto Maple Leafs
July 25, 2006	Jan Bulis	Vancouver Canucks	Montreal Canadiens
July 26, 2006	Danny Markov	Detroit Red Wings	Nashville Predators
July 27, 2006	Brad Ference	Calgary Flames	New Jersey Devils
July 31, 2006	Dominik Hasek	Detroit Red Wings	Ottawa Senators
August 1, 2006	Craig MacDonald	Chicago Blackhawks	Calgary Flames
August 2, 2006	Jesse Boulerice	Carolina Hurricanes	St. Louis Blues
August 2, 2006	Serge Payer	Ottawa Senators	Florida Panthers
August 2, 2006	Martin Rucinsky	St. Louis Blues	New York Rangers
August 2, 2006	Dean McAmmond	Ottawa Senators	St. Louis Blues
August 7, 2006	Nathan Dempsey	Boston Bruins	Los Angeles Kings
August 8, 2006	Sebastien Caron	Chicago Blackhawks	Pittsburgh Penguins
August 8, 2006	Manny Legace	St. Louis Blues	Detroit Red Wings
August 9, 2006	Mathieu Biron	San Jose Sharks	Washington Capitals
August 10, 2006	Travis Green	Anaheim Ducks	Boston Bruins
August 11, 2006	Petr Sykora	Edmonton Oilers	New York Rangers
August 13, 2006	Filip Novak	Columbus Blue Jackets	Ottawa Senators
August 14, 2006	Eric Godard	Calgary Flames	New York Islanders
August 14, 2006	Greg Johnson	Detroit Red Wings	Nashville Predators
August 15, 2006	Sean Hill	New York Islanders	Florida Panthers
August 15, 2006	Ian Moran	Anaheim Ducks	Boston Bruins
August 16, 2006	Owen Nolan	Phoenix Coyotes	Toronto Maple Leafs
August 18, 2006	Rory Fitzpatrick	Vancouver Canucks	Buffalo Sabres
August 18, 2006	Andrew Penner	Pittsburgh Penguins	Columbus Blue Jackets
August 18, 2006	Jamie Rivers	St. Louis Blues	Phoenix Coyotes
August 22, 2006	Alex Henry	Nashville Predators	Minnesota Wild
August 22, 2006	Eric Boguniecki	Columbus Blue Jackets	Pittsburgh Penguins
August 29, 2006	Jean-Pierre Dumont	Nashville Predators	Buffalo Sabres
August 29, 2006	David Tanabe	Carolina Hurricanes	Boston Bruins
August 30, 2006	Brad Isbister	Carolina Hurricanes	Boston Bruins
September 13, 2006	Viktor Kozlov	New York Islanders	New Jersey Devils
September 13, 2006	Anson Carter	Columbus Blue Jackets	Vancouver Canucks
September 14, 2006	Radek Dvorak	St. Louis Blues	Edmonton Oilers
September 14, 2006	John Erskine	Washington Capitals	New York Islanders
September 24, 2006	Brian Boucher	Chicago Blackhawks	Calgary Flames
September 29, 2006	Mike Dunham	New York Islanders	Atlanta Thrashers
September 29, 2006	Jeff Hamilton	Chicago Blackhawks	New York Islanders
October 2, 2006	Richard Park	New York Islanders	Vancouver Canucks
October 4, 2006	Dan LaCouture	New Jersey Devils	Boston Bruins
October 6, 2006	Boyd Devereaux	Toronto Maple Leafs	Phoenix Coyotes
October 15, 2006	Nathan Perrott	Toronto Maple Leafs	Dallas Stars
October 29, 2006	Yanic Perreault	Phoenix Coyotes	Nashville Predators
November 2, 2006	Jim Dowd	New Jersey Devils	Colorado Avalanche
December 10, 2006	Peter Bondra	Chicago Blackhawks	Atlanta Thrashers

== Trades ==
=== July ===
July 2, 2006	To Dallas Stars Darryl Sydor	To Tampa Bay Lightning 4th-round pick in 2008 (OTT - #119 - Derek Grant)^{1}
July 3, 2006	To Anaheim Ducks Chris Pronger	To Edmonton Oilers Joffrey Lupul; Ladislav Smid; 1st-round pick in 2007 (PHX - #30 - Nick Ross)^{2} conditional 1st-round pick in 2008 (#22 - Jordan Eberle)^{3} 2nd-round pick in 2008 (NYI - #53 - Travis Hamonic)^{4}
July 5, 2006	To Los Angeles Kings Dan Cloutier	To Vancouver Canucks 2nd-round pick in 2007 (#33 - Taylor Ellington) future considerations (conditional 3rd-round pick in 2009^{5} BUF - #66 - Brayden McNabb)^{6}
July 9, 2006	To San Jose Sharks Mark Bell	To Chicago Blackhawks Tom Preissing; Josh Hennessy
July 9, 2006	To Chicago Blackhawks Martin Havlat; Bryan Smolinski	To Ottawa Senators Tom Preissing; Josh Hennessy; Michal Barinka; 2nd-round pick in 2008 (#42 - Patrick Wiercioch)
July 10, 2006	To Edmonton Oilers Jan Hejda	To Buffalo Sabres 7th-round pick in 2007 (#187 - Nick Eno)
July 12, 2006	To Montreal Canadiens Mike Johnson	To Phoenix Coyotes 4th-round pick in 2007 (#103 - Vladimir Ruzicka)
July 12, 2006	To Washington Capitals Richard Zednik	To Montreal Canadiens 3rd-round pick in 2007 (#65 - Olivier Fortier)
July 14, 2006	To Vancouver Canucks rights to Taylor Pyatt	To Buffalo Sabres 4th-round pick in 2007 (CGY - #116 - Keith Aulie)^{7}
July 18, 2006	To Carolina Hurricanes Scott Walker	To Nashville Predators Josef Vasicek
July 19, 2006	To New York Rangers Adam Hall	To Nashville Predators rights to Dominic Moore
July 19, 2006	To Pittsburgh Penguins Libor Pivko rights to Dominic Moore	To Nashville Predators 3rd-round pick in 2007 (#81 - Ryan Thang)
July 20, 2006	To Pittsburgh Penguins Nils Ekman; Patrick Ehelechner	To San Jose Sharks 2nd-round pick in 2007 (PHI - #41 - Kevin Marshall)^{8}

1. Tampa Bay's acquired fourth-round pick went to Ottawa as the result of a trade on June 23, 2007, that sent a fifth and seventh-round pick and two seventh-round picks (#183 & #210 overall) in the 2007 entry draft to Tampa Bay in exchange for this pick.
2. Edmonton's acquired first-round pick went to Phoenix as the result of a trade on June 22, 2007, that sent a first-round pick (#21 overall) in the 2007 entry draft to Edmonton in exchange for a second-round pick in the 2007 entry draft and this pick.
3. The condition of this pick was if Anaheim reaches the 2007 Stanley Cup Finals. The condition was met on May 22, 2007.
4. Edmonton's acquired second-round pick went to the Islanders as the result of a trade on July 5, 2007, that sent Allan Rourke and a third-round pick in the 2008 entry draft to Edmonton in exchange for this pick.
5. The condition of this pick was if Cloutier resigns with Los Angeles prior to the start of the 2006-07 NHL Season. The condition was met on September 27, 2006.
6. Vancouver's acquired third-round pick went to Buffalo Sabres as the result of a trade on July 4, 2008, that sent Steve Bernier to Vancouver in exchange for a second-round pick in 2010 entry draft and this pick.
7. Buffalo's acquired fourth-round pick went to Calgary as the result of a trade on June 23, 2007, that sent two fifth-round picks (#139 & #147 overall) in the 2007 entry draft to Buffalo in exchange for this pick.
8. Washington's acquired second-round pick went to Philadelphia as the result of a trade on June 23, 2007, that sent a third-round pick in the 2007 entry draft and a second-round pick in the 2008 entry draft to Washington in exchange for this pick.
  Washington previously acquired this pick as the result of a trade on June 22, 2007, that sent a first-round pick in the 2007 entry draft to San Jose in exchange for a second-round pick in the 2008 entry draft and this pick.

=== August ===
August 2, 2006	To Chicago Blackhawks rights to Vaclav Pletka	To Philadelphia Flyers Eric Meloche
August 4, 2006	To Chicago Blackhawks Michal Handzus	To Philadelphia Flyers Kyle Calder
August 17, 2006	To Anaheim Ducks Karl Stewart; 2nd-round pick in 2007 (COL - #55 - TJ Galiardi)^{1} conditional 4th-round pick in 2008^{2}	To Atlanta Thrashers Vitaly Vishnevskiy

1. Anaheim's acquired second-round pick went to Colorado as the result of a trade on November 13, 2006, that sent George Parros and a third-round pick (#75 overall) in the 2007 entry draft to Anaheim in exchange for a third-round pick (#91 overall) in the 2007 entry draft and this pick.
2. The conditions of this pick are unknown and no selection was made by Anaheim.

=== September ===
September 12, 2006	To Vancouver Canucks Drew MacIntyre	To Detroit Red Wings future considerations
September 29, 2006	To Los Angeles Kings Jack Johnson; Oleg Tverdovsky	To Carolina Hurricanes Tim Gleason; Eric Belanger
September 30, 2006	To Dallas Stars Mike Ribeiro; 6th-round pick in 2008 (#176 - Matthew Tassone)	To Montreal Canadiens Janne Niinimaa; 5th-round pick in 2007 (#142 - Andrew Conboy)

=== October ===
October 1, 2006	To New Jersey Devils Alexander Korolyuk; Jim Fahey	To San Jose Sharks Vladimir Malakhov conditional 1st-round pick in 2007^{1} (STL - #26 - David Perron)^{2}
October 25, 2006	To New York Islanders Eric Boguniecki	To Columbus Blue Jackets Ryan Caldwell

1. The condition of this pick was San Jose would receive a first-round pick in the 2007 entry draft if Malakhov does not resume his NHL career. The condition was converted as Malakhov never played another game professionally after this trade.
2. San Jose's acquired first-round pick went to the St. Louis Blues as the result of a trade on February 27, 2007, that sent Bill Guerin to San Jose in exchange for Ville Nieminen, Jay Barriball and this pick.

=== November ===
November 9, 2006	To Tampa Bay Lightning Daniel Corso	To Philadelphia Flyers Darren Reid
November 13, 2006	To Boston Bruins Stanislav Chistov	To Anaheim Ducks Anaheim's option of a 3rd-round pick in 2007 (#63 - Maxime Macenauer) or 2008; Anaheim's option to swap 4th-round picks in 2008^{1}
November 13, 2006	To Philadelphia Flyers Todd Fedoruk	To Anaheim Ducks 4th-round pick in 2007 (#92 - Justin Vaive)
November 13, 2006	To Anaheim Ducks George Parros; 3rd-round pick in 2007 (TBL - #75 - Luca Cunti)^{2}	To Colorado Avalanche 2nd-round pick in 2007 (#55 - TJ Galiardi); 3rd-round pick in 2007 (SJS - #91 - Tyson Sexsmith)^{3}
November 14, 2006	To Boston Bruins Philippe Sauve	To Phoenix Coyotes Tyler Redenbach
November 21, 2006	To New York Rangers Brad Isbister	To Carolina Hurricanes rights to Jakub Petruzalek conditional 5th-round pick in 2008^{4}
November 28, 2006	To Phoenix Coyotes Mikael Tellqvist	To Toronto Maple Leafs Tyson Nash; 4th-round pick in 2007 (#99 - Matt Frattin)
November 29, 2006	To Columbus Blue Jackets Derrick Walser	To Carolina Hurricanes Mark Flood

1. The option to swap picks was relinquished in subsequent trade.
2. Anaheim's acquired third-round pick went to Tampa Bay as the result of a trade on February 24, 2007, that sent Gerald Coleman and a first-round pick in the 2007 entry draft to Anaheim in exchange for Shane O'Brien and this pick.
3. Colorado's acquired third-round pick went to San Jose as the result of a trade on February 24, 2007, that sent fourth-round pick and a fifth-round pick in the 2007 entry draft along with a sixth-round pick in the 2008 entry draft to Colorado in exchange for this pick.
4. The condition of this pick was if Isbister plays more than 40 games in the remaining 2006–07 NHL season. The condition was not met as Isbister played 19 games.

=== December ===
December 15, 2006	To Montreal Canadiens Mathieu Biron	To San Jose Sharks Patrick Traverse
December 16, 2006	To Philadelphia Flyers Alexei Zhitnik	To New York Islanders Freddy Meyer conditional 3rd-round pick in 2007^{1} (#62 - Mark Katic) or 2nd-round pick in 2008
December 19, 2006	To Pittsburgh Penguins Wade Brookbank	To Boston Bruins future considerations
December 20, 2006	To Philadelphia Flyers Mike York	To New York Islanders Randy Robitaille; 5rh-round pick in 2008 (#148 - Matt Martin)
December 28, 2006	To Anaheim Ducks Sebastien Caron; Matt Keith; Chris Durno	To Chicago Blackhawks Bruno St-Jacques; P.A. Parenteau

1. The conditions of this pick are unknown.

=== January ===
January 3, 2007	To Phoenix Coyotes Alexei Kaigorodov	To Ottawa Senators Mike Comrie
January 3, 2007	To Anaheim Ducks Ric Jackman	To Florida Panthers conditional pick in 2007^{1} (6th-round - #181 - Corey Syvret)
January 5, 2007	To New York Islanders Tomas Malec	To Ottawa Senators Matt Koalska
January 8, 2007	To Carolina Hurricanes Dennis Seidenberg	To Phoenix Coyotes Kevyn Adams
January 16, 2007	To St. Louis Blues Yan Stastny	To Boston Bruins 5th-round pick in 2007 (#130 - Denis Reul)
January 20, 2007	To Tampa Bay Lightning Ryan Munce	To Los Angeles Kings 4th-round pick in 2008 (SJS - #92 - Samuel Groulx)^{2}
January 24, 2007	To Anaheim Ducks Joe Rullier	To Vancouver Canucks Colby Genoway
January 26, 2007	To Anaheim Ducks Shane Endicott	To Nashville Predators Chris Durno
January 26, 2007	To Anaheim Ducks Joe Motzko; Mark Hartigan; 4th-round pick in 2007 (#98 - Sebastian Stefaniszin)	To Columbus Blue Jackets Zenon Konopka; Curtis Glencross; Anaheim's option 7th-round pick in 2007 (#211 - Trent Vogelhuber) or 2008 entry draft
January 29, 2007	To Calgary Flames Craig Conroy	To Los Angeles Kings Jamie Lundmark; 4th-round pick in 2007 (#109 - Dwight King); 2nd-round pick in 2008 (CGY - #92 - Mitch Wahl)^{3}

1. The conditions of this pick are unknown.
2. Los Angeles' acquired fourth-round pick went to San Jose as the result of a trade on June 21, 2008, that sent a fourth-round pick in the 2009 entry draft and a fifth-round pick in the 2010 entry draft to Los Angeles in exchange for this pick.
3. Calgary re-acquired this pick as the result of a trade on June 20, 2008, that sent a first-round pick in 2008 entry draft and a second-round pick in 2009 entry draft to Los Angeles in exchange for Michael Cammalleri and this pick.

=== February ===
February 1, 2007	To Washington Capitals Milan Jurcina	To Boston Bruins conditional pick in 2008^{1} (CGY - 4th-round - #114 - TJ Brodie)^{2}
February 1, 2007	To Atlanta Thrashers Andy Delmore; Andre Deveaux	To Tampa Bay Lightning Kyle Wanvig; Stephen Baby
February 3, 2007	To Chicago Blackhawks Kris Versteeg conditional 5th-round pick in 2008^{3}	To Boston Bruins Brandon Bochenski
February 5, 2007	To New York Rangers Sean Avery rights to John Seymour	To Los Angeles Kings Jason Ward rights to Marc-Andre Cliche rights to Jan Marek conditional 3rd-round pick in 2008^{4} (BUF - #81 - Corey Fienhage)^{5}
February 9, 2007	To New York Rangers Pascal Dupuis	To Minnesota Wild Adam Hall
February 9, 2007	To Carolina Hurricanes Josef Vasicek	To Nashville Predators Eric Belanger
February 10, 2007	To Atlanta Thrashers Eric Belanger	To Nashville Predators Vitaly Vishnevskiy
February 10, 2007	To Calgary Flames Brad Stuart; Wayne Primeau conditional 4th-round pick in 2008^{1} (#114 - TJ Brodie)^{6}	To Boston Bruins Chuck Kobasew; Andrew Ference
February 12, 2007	To Dallas Stars Ladislav Nagy	To Phoenix Coyotes Mathias Tjarnqvist; 1st-round pick in 2007 (EDM - #21 - Riley Nash)^{7}
February 15, 2007	To Nashville Predators Peter Forsberg	To Philadelphia Flyers Scottie Upshall; Ryan Parent; 1st-round pick in 2007 (NSH - #23 - Jonathon Blum)^{8} 3rd-round pick in 2007 (WSH - #84 - Phil DeSimone)^{9}
February 16, 2007	To San Jose Sharks rights to Alexander Korolyuk	To New Jersey Devils conditional 3rd-round pick in 2007^{10}
February 18, 2007	To New York Islanders Marc-Andre Bergeron; 3rd-round pick in 2008 (#73 - Kirill Petrov)	To Edmonton Oilers Denis Grebeshkov
February 23, 2007	To Carolina Hurricanes Anson Carter	To Columbus Blue Jackets 5th-round pick in 2008 (#135 - Tomas Kubalik)
February 23, 2007	To Dallas Stars Shane Endicott	To Anaheim Ducks future considerations
February 24, 2007	To Tampa Bay Lightning Shane O'Brien; 3rd-round pick in 2007 (#75 - Luca Cunti)	To Anaheim Ducks Gerald Coleman; 1st-round pick in 2007 (MIN - #16 - Colton Gillies)^{11}
February 24, 2007	To Atlanta Thrashers Alexei Zhitnik	To Philadelphia Flyers Braydon Coburn
February 25, 2007	To Atlanta Thrashers Keith Tkachuk	To St. Louis Blues Glen Metropolit; 1st-round pick in 2007 (CGY - #24 - Mikael Backlund)^{12} 3rd-round pick in 2007 (#85 - Brett Sonne); 2nd-round pick in 2008 (#33 - Philip McRae) conditional 1st-round pick in 2008^{13}
February 25, 2007	To San Jose Sharks Craig Rivet; 5th-round pick in 2008 (#146 - Julien Demers)	To Montreal Canadiens Josh Gorges; 1st-round pick in 2007 (#22 - Max Pacioretty)
February 26, 2007	To Philadelphia Flyers Lasse Kukkonen; 3rd-round pick in 2007 (#66 - Garrett Klotz)	To Chicago Blackhawks Kyle Calder
February 26, 2007	To Detroit Red Wings Kyle Calder	To Chicago Blackhawks Jason Williams
February 26, 2007	To Ottawa Senators Lawrence Nycholat	To Washington Capitals Andy Hedlund; 6th-round pick in 2007 (#180 - Justin Taylor)
February 26, 2007	To Vancouver Canucks Brent Sopel	To Los Angeles Kings Los Angeles' option of a 2nd-round pick in 2007 (#61 - Wayne Simmonds) or 2008; 4th-round pick in 2008 (BUF - #101 - Justin Jokinen)^{14}
February 26, 2007	To New York Islanders Richard Zednik	To Washington Capitals 2nd-round pick in 2007 (#46 - Theo Ruth)
February 26, 2007	To Vancouver Canucks Bryan Smolinski	To Chicago Blackhawks Chicago's option of a 2nd-round pick in 2007 (#56 - Akim Aliu) or 2008
February 27, 2007	To Minnesota Wild Dominic Moore	To Pittsburgh Penguins 3rd-round pick in 2007 (#80 - Casey Pierro-Zabotel)
February 27, 2007	To Atlanta Thrashers Pascal Dupuis; 3rd-round pick in 2007 (PIT - #78 - Robert Bortuzzo)^{1}	To New York Rangers Alex Bourret
February 27, 2007	To Los Angeles Kings Jaroslav Modry; Johan Fransson; 2nd-round pick in 2007 (#52 - Oscar Moller); 3rd-round pick in 2007 (#82 - Bryan Cameron); 1st-round pick in 2008 (PHX - #28 - Viktor Tikhonov)^{2}	To Dallas Stars Mattias Norstrom; Konstantin Pushkarev; 3rd-round pick in 2007 (#64 - Sergei Korostin); 4th-round pick in 2007 (CBJ - #94 - Maksim Mayorov)^{3}
February 27, 2007	To Colorado Avalanche Scott Parker	To San Jose Sharks 6th-round pick in 2008 (COL - #170 - Jonas Holos)^{4}
February 27, 2007	To San Jose Sharks Bill Guerin	To St. Louis Blues Ville Nieminen; Jay Barriball; 1st-round pick in 2007 (#26 - David Perron)
February 27, 2007	To Pittsburgh Penguins Nolan Schaefer	To San Jose Sharks 7th-round pick in 2007 (#201 - Justin Braun)
February 27, 2007	To Ottawa Senators Oleg Saprykin; 7th-round pick in 2007 (TBL - #183 - Torrie Jung)^{5}	To Phoenix Coyotes 2nd-round pick in 2008 (#49 - Jared Staal)
February 27, 2007	To Buffalo Sabres Ty Conklin	To Columbus Blue Jackets 5th-round pick in 2007 (DAL - #149 - Michael Neal)^{6}
February 27, 2007	To Buffalo Sabres Dainius Zubrus; Timo Helbling	To Washington Capitals Jiri Novotny; 1st-round pick in 2007 (SJS - #28 - Nick Petrecki)^{7}
February 27, 2007	To Philadelphia Flyers Martin Biron	To Buffalo Sabres 2nd-round pick in 2007 (#31 - TJ Brennan)
February 27, 2007	To Buffalo Sabres Mikko Lehtonen	To Nashville Predators 4th-round pick in 2007 (#119 - Mark Santorelli)
February 27, 2007	To Detroit Red Wings Todd Bertuzzi	To Florida Panthers Shawn Matthias; 2nd-round pick in 2007 (NSH - #58 - Nick Spaling)^{8} conditional 2nd-round pick in 2008^{9}
February 27, 2007	To New York Rangers Paul Mara	To Boston Bruins Aaron Ward
February 27, 2007	To Pittsburgh Penguins Georges Laraque	To Phoenix Coyotes Daniel Carcillo; 3rd-round pick in 2008 (NYR - #90 - Tomas Kundratek)^{10}
February 27, 2007	To Pittsburgh Penguins Joel Kwiatkowski	To Florida Panthers 4th-round pick in 2007 (#101 - Matt Rust)
February 27, 2007	To Pittsburgh Penguins Gary Roberts	To Florida Panthers Noah Welch
February 27, 2007	To New York Islanders Ryan Smyth	To Edmonton Oilers Robert Nilsson; Ryan O'Marra; 1st-round pick in 2007 (#15 - Alex Plante)
February 27, 2007	To Phoenix Coyotes Brendan Bell; 2nd-round pick in 2008 (NSH - #38 - Roman Josi)^{11}	To Toronto Maple Leafs Yanic Perreault; 5th-round pick in 2008 (#129 - Joel Champagne)
February 27, 2007	To Chicago Blackhawks Nikita Alexeev	To Tampa Bay Lightning Karl Stewart; 6th-round pick in 2008 (#160 - Luke Witkowski)
February 27, 2007	To Anaheim Ducks Doug O'Brien	To Tampa Bay Lightning Joe Rullier
February 27, 2007	To Tampa Bay Lightning Jason Ward	To Los Angeles Kings 5th-round pick in 2007 (#137 - Joshua Turnbull)
February 27, 2007	To Los Angeles Kings Jamie Heward	To Washington Capitals conditional 5th-round pick in 2008^{12}
February 27, 2007	To Calgary Flames David Hale; 5th-round pick in 2007 (BUF - #147 - Jean-Simon Allard)^{13}	To New Jersey Devils 3rd-round pick in 2007 (#79 - Nick Palmieri)
February 27, 2007	To Anaheim Ducks Brad May	To Colorado Avalanche Michael Wall
February 27, 2007	To St. Louis Blues Brad Boyes	To Boston Bruins Dennis Wideman
February 27, 2007	To Minnesota Wild Aaron Voros	To New Jersey Devils 7th-round pick in 2008 (#205 - Jean-Sebastien Berube)

1. The condition of this pick was if Jurcina averages more than 20 minutes per game for the 2007–08 NHL season, Boston would receive a third-round pick and if less than 20 minutes, a fourth-round pick in the 2008 entry draft. Boston received a fourth-round pick as Jurcina averaged 16:38 minutes for the season.
2. Boston's acquired fourth-round pick went to Calgary as the result of a trade on February 10, 2007, that sent Andrew Ference and Chuck Kobasew to Boston in exchange for Brad Stuart, Wayne Primeau and a conditional pick (this pick) in the 2008 entry draft. The condition of this pick was if Calgary does not re-sign Stuart after the 2007–08 NHL season, they will receive a fourth-round pick in the 2008 entry draft. The condition was converted on July 3, 2007, when Stuart signed with Los Angeles.
3. The condition of this pick was if Bochenski played more than 80 NHL games between the day of the trade and the end of the 2007–08 NHL season. Conditions were not met as Bochenski played 71 games.
4. The condition of this pick was if Los Angeles fails to sign Marek before the 2007–08 NHL season. It was converted.
5. Los Angeles acquired third-round pick went to Buffalo as the result of a trade on June 21, 2008, that sent a third-round pick (#74 overall) in the 2008 entry draft to Los Angeles in exchange for a fourth-round pick in 2008 entry draft and this pick.
6. The condition of this pick was if Calgary does not re-sign Stuart after the 2007–08 NHL season, they will receive a fourth-round pick in the 2008 entry draft. The condition was converted on July 3, 2007, when Stuart signed with Los Angeles.
7. Phoenix's acquired first-round pick went to Edmonton Oilers as the result of a trade on June 22, 2007, that sent a first-round pick (#30 overall) and a second-round pick in the 2007 entry draft to Phoenix in exchange for this pick.
8. Nashville's first-round pick was re-acquired as the result of a trade on June 18, 2007, that sent Kimmo Timonen and Scott Hartnell to Philadelphia in exchange for this pick.
9. Philadelphia's acquired third-round pick went to Washington as the result of a trade on June 23, 2007, that sent a second-round pick in the 2007 entry draft to Philadelphia in exchange for a second-round pick in the 2008 entry draft and this pick.
10. The conditions of this pick are unknown.
11. Anaheim's acquired first-round pick went to Minnesota as the result of a trade on June 22, 2007, that sent a first-round pick (#19 overall) and a second-round pick in the 2007 entry draft to Anaheim in exchange for this pick.
12. St. Louis' acquired first-round pick went to Calgary as the result of a trade on June 22, 2007, that sent a first-round pick (#18 overall) in the 2007 Entry Draft to St. Louis in exchange for a third-round pick in the 2007 entry draft and this pick.
13. The condition of this pick was if Atlanta re-sign Tkachuk after the 2007–08 NHL season, St. Louis will receive a first-round pick in the 2008 entry draft. The condition was not met when Atlanta trades Tkachuk rights back to St. Louis on June 26, 2007.
14. Los Angeles' acquired fourth-round pick went to Buffalo as the result of a trade on June 21, 2008, that sent a third-round pick (#74 overall) in the 2008 entry draft to Los Angeles in exchange for a third-round pick (#81 overall) in the 2008 entry draft and this pick.
15. Atlanta's acquired third-round pick went to Pittsburgh as the result of a trade on June 22, 2007, that sent Chris Thorburn to Atlanta in exchange for this pick.
16. Anaheim's acquired first-round pick went to the Phoenix as the result of a trade on June 20, 2008, that sent two second-round picks (35th and 39th overall) in the 2008 entry draft to Anaheim in exchange for this pick.
  Anaheim previously acquired this pick as the result of a trade on June 20, 2008, that sent a first-round pick (12th overall) in the 2008 entry draft to Los Angeles in exchange for a first-round pick (17th overall) in the 2008 entry draft and this pick.
17. Dallas's acquired fourth-round pick went to Columbus as the result of a trade on June 23, 2007, that sent three fifth-round picks (#128, #129 & #149 overall) in the 2007 entry draft to Dallas in exchange for this pick.
18. Colorado's sixth-round was re-acquired as the result of a trade on June 23, 2007, that sent a third-round pick in the 2007 entry draft to San Jose in exchange for a fourth-round pick and a fifth-round pick in the 2007 entry draft along with this pick.
19. Ottawa's acquired seventh-round pick went to Tampa Bay as the result of a trade on June 23, 2007, that sent a fourth-round pick in the 2008 entry draft to Ottawa in exchange for a fifth-round pick and a seventh-round pick (#210 overall) in the 2007 entry draft along with this pick.
20. Columbus's acquired fifth-round pick went to Dallas as the result of a trade on June 23, 2007, that sent a fourth-round pick in the 2007 entry draft to Columbus in exchange for two fifth-round picks (#128 & 129) in the 2007 entry draft and this pick.
21. Washington's Acquired first-round pick went to the San Jose as the result of a trade on June 22, 2007, that sent a second-round pick in the 2007 entry draft and a second-round pick in the 2008 to Washington in exchange for this pick.
22. Florida's acquired second-round pick went to Nashville as the result of a trade on June 22, 2007, that sent Tomas Vokoun to Florida in exchange for conditional second-round pick in the 2007 entry draft or 2008, a first-round pick in the 2008 entry draft and this pick. Conditions of this pick are unknown.
23. The condition of this pick was if Bertuzzi re-signed with Detroit. Condition was not met.
24. Phoenix's acquired third-round pick went to the Rangers as the result of a trade on June 21, 2008, that sent Alex Bourret to Phoenix in exchange for this pick.
25. Phoenix's acquired second-round pick went to Nashville as the result of a trade on June 21, 2008, that sent a second-round (#46 overall) and a third-round pick in the 2008 entry draft to Phoenix in exchange for this pick.
26. The condition of this pick was if Heward re-signed with Los Angeles. Condition was not met.
27. Calgary's acquired fifth-round pick went to Buffalo as the result of a trade on June 23, 2007, that sent a fourth-round pick in the 2007 entry draft to Calgary in exchange for a fifth-round pick (#139 overall) in the 2007 entry draft and this pick.

=== May ===
May 16, 2007	To Boston Bruins Adam McQuaid	To Columbus Blue Jackets 5th-round pick in 2007 (DAL - #129 - Jamie Benn)^{1}
May 31, 2007	To Montreal Canadiens rights to Ryan Russell	To New York Rangers 7th-round pick in 2007 (#193 - David Skokan)

1. Columbus' acquired fifth-round pick went to Dallas as the result of a trade on June 23, 2007, that sent a fourth-round pick in the 2007 entry draft to Columbus in exchange for three fifth-round picks (#128, #149 overall and this pick) in the 2007 entry draft.

=== June ===
The 2007 NHL entry draft was held on June 22–23, 2007.

June 4, 2007	To Nashville Predators Matt Ellison	To Philadelphia Flyers future considerations
June 13, 2007	To Tampa Bay Lightning Chris Gratton	To Florida Panthers conditional 2nd-round pick in 2007 in 2008 (2008 - #31 - Jacob Markstrom)^{1}
June 16, 2007	To Chicago Blackhawks Sergei Samsonov	To Montreal Canadiens Jassen Cullimore; Tony Salmelainen
June 18, 2007	To Philadelphia Flyers Kimmo Timonen; Scott Hartnell	To Nashville Predators 1st-round pick in 2007 (#23 - Jonathon Blum)
June 22, 2007	To Toronto Maple Leafs Vesa Toskala; Mark Bell	To San Jose Sharks San Jose's option of a 1st-round pick in 2007 (STL - #13 - Lars Eller)^{1} in 2008; 2nd-round pick in 2007 (STL - #44 - Aaron Palushaj)^{2} 4th-round pick in 2009 (NSH - #98 - Craig Smith)^{3}
June 22, 2007	To San Jose Sharks 1st-round pick in 2007 (#9 - Logan Couture)	To St. Louis Blues 1st-round pick in 2007 (#13 - Lars Eller); 2nd-round pick in 2007 (#44 - Aaron Palushaj); 3rd-round pick in 2008 (#87 - Ian Schultz)
June 22, 2007	To Anaheim Ducks 1st-round pick in 2007 (#19 - Logan MacMillan); 2nd-round pick in 2007 (#42 - Eric Tangradi)	To Minnesota Wild 1st-round pick in 2007 (#16 - Colton Gillies)
June 22, 2007	To Calgary Flames 1st-round pick in 2007 (#24 - Mikael Backlund); 3rd-round pick in 2007 (#70 - John Negrin)	To St. Louis Blues 1st-round pick in 2007 (#18 - Ian Cole)
June 22, 2007	To Phoenix Coyotes 1st-round pick in 2007 (#30 - Nick Ross); 2nd-round pick in 2007 (#36 - Joel Gistedt)	To Edmonton Oilers 1st-round pick in 2007 (#21 - Riley Nash)
June 22, 2007	To San Jose Sharks 1st-round pick in 2007 (#28 - Nick Petrecki)	To Washington Capitals 2nd-round pick in 2007 (PHI - #41 - Kevin Marshall)^{4} 2nd-round pick in 2008 (#57 - Eric Mestery)
June 22, 2007	To Atlanta Thrashers Chris Thorburn	To Pittsburgh Penguins 3rd-round pick in 2007 (#78 - Robert Bortuzzo)
June 22, 2007	To Florida Panthers Tomas Vokoun	To Nashville Predators 2nd-round pick in 2007 (#58 - Nick Spaling) conditional 2nd-round pick in 2007 in 2008^{5} (NYI - #40 - Aaron Ness)^{6} 1st-round pick in 2008 (NYI - #9 - Josh Bailey)^{7}
June 22, 2007	To Calgary Flames Adrian Aucoin; 7th-round pick in 2007 (#186 - C.J. Severyn)	To Chicago Blackhawks Andrei Zyuzin; Steve Marr
June 23, 2007	To Atlanta Thrashers Jesse Schultz	To Vancouver Canucks Jim Sharrow
June 23, 2007	To Boston Bruins 2nd-round pick in 2007 (#35 - Tommy Cross)	To Chicago Blackhawks 2nd-round pick in 2007 (#38 - Bill Sweatt); 3rd-round pick in 2007 (#69 - Maxime Tanguay)
June 23, 2007	To Washington Capitals 3rd-round pick in 2007 (#84 - Phil DeSimone); 2nd-round pick in 2008 (#58 - Dmitri Kugryshev)	To Philadelphia Flyers 2nd-round pick in 2007 (#41 - Kevin Marshall)
June 23, 2007	To San Jose Sharks 3rd-round pick in 2007 (#91 - Tyson Sexsmith)	To Colorado Avalanche 4th-round pick in 2007 (#113 - Kent Patterson); 5th-round pick in 2007 (CGY - #143 - Mickey Renaud)^{1} 6th-round pick in 2008 (#170 - Jonas Holos)
June 23, 2007	To Dallas Stars 5th-round pick in 2007 (#128 - Austin Smith); 5th-round pick in 2007 (#129 - Jamie Benn); 5th-round pick in 2007 (#149 - Michael Neal)	To Columbus Blue Jackets 4th-round pick in 2007 (#94 - Maksim Mayorov)
June 23, 2007	To Los Angeles Kings 4th-round pick in 2007 (#95 - Alec Martinez)	To Washington Capitals 6th-round pick in 2007 (#154 - Dan Dunn); 4th-round pick in 2008 (#93 - Braden Holtby)
June 23, 2007	To Pittsburgh Penguins Tim Brent	To Anaheim Ducks Stephen Dixon
June 23, 2007	To Buffalo Sabres 5th-round pick in 2007 (#139 - Bradley Eidsness); 5th-round pick in 2007 (#147 - Jean-Simon Allard)	To Calgary Flames 4th-round pick in 2007 (#116 - Keith Aulie)
June 23, 2007	To Calgary Flames 5th-round pick in 2007 (#143 - Mickey Renaud)	To Colorado Avalanche 6th-round pick in 2007 (#155 - Jens Hellgren); 6th-round pick in 2007 (BOS - #169 - Radim Ostrcil)^{2}
June 23, 2007	To Tampa Bay Lightning 5th-round pick in 2007 (#150 - Matt Marshall); 7th-round pick in 2007 (#183 - Torrie Jung); 7th-round pick in 2007 (#210 - Justin Courtnall)	To Ottawa Senators 4th-round pick in 2008 (#119 - Derek Grant)
June 23, 2007	To Boston Bruins 6th-round pick in 2007 (#169 - Radim Ostrcil)	To Colorado Avalanche 6th-round pick in 2008 (#167 - Joel Chouinard)
June 23, 2007	To Vancouver Canucks Ryan Shannon	To Anaheim Ducks rights to Jason King conditional 3rd-round pick in 2009^{3}
June 23, 2007	To Carolina Hurricanes Michael Leighton	To Montreal Canadiens 7th-round pick in 2007 (#192 - Scott Kishel)
June 25, 2007	To Anaheim Ducks Brandon Segal	To Nashville Predators future considerations
June 26, 2007	To St. Louis Blues rights to Keith Tkachuk conditional 4th-round pick in 2008^{1}	To Atlanta Thrashers conditional 1st-round pick in 2008^{2}

1. Conditions if this draft pick are unknown.
2. San Jose's acquired first-round pick went to St. Louis as the result of a trade on June 22, 2007, that sent a first-round pick (#9 overall) in the 2007 entry draft to San Jose in exchange for a second-round pick in the 2007 entry draft, a third-round pick in the 2008 entry draft and this pick.
3. San Jose's acquired first-round pick went to St. Louis as the result of a trade on June 22, 2007, that sent a first-round pick (#9 overall) in the 2007 entry draft to San Jose in exchange for a first-round pick (#13 overall) in the 2007 entry draft, a third-round pick in the 2008 entry draft and this pick.
4. San Jose's fourth-round pick went to Nashville as the result of a trade on June 21, 2008, that sent a fourth-round pick in 2008 entry draft to the San Jose in exchange for a seventh-round pick in the 2008 entry draft and this pick.
5. Washington's acquired second-round pick went to Philadelphia as the result of a trade on June 23, 2007, that sent a third-round pick in the 2007 entry draft and a second-round pick in the 2008 entry draft to Washington in exchange for this pick.
6. The conditions of this pick are unknown.
7. Nashville's acquired second-round pick went to the Islanders as the result of a trade on June 20, 2008, that sent a first-round pick (#7 overall) in the 2008 entry draft to Nashville in exchange for a first-round pick (#9 overall) in the 2008 entry draft and this pick.
8. Nashville's first-round pick went to the Islanders as the result of a trade on June 20, 2008, that sent a first-round pick (#7 overall) in the 2008 entry draft to Nashville in exchange for a second-round pick in the 2008 entry draft and this pick.
9. Colorado's acquired fifth-round pick went to Calgary as the result of a trade on June 23, 2007, that sent two sixth-round picks (#155 & #169 overall) in the 2007 entry draft to Colorado in exchange for this pick.
10. Colorado's acquired sixth-round pick went to Boston as the result of a trade on June 23, 2007, that sent a sixth-round pick in the 2008 entry draft to Colorado in exchange for this pick.
11. The conditions of this pick was dependent on the number of games Shannon played with the Canucks. The conditions were not met.
12. The condition of this draft pick was that St. Louis would receive this pick if Tkachuk didn't sign with St. Louis as a free agent for the 2007–08 season. Tkachuck signed with St. Louis on July 1, 2007.
13. The original condition of this pick was if Atlanta re-signed Tkachuk after the 2007–08 NHL season, St. Louis would receive a first-round pick in the 2008 entry draft. The condition was not met when Atlanta traded Tkachuk rights back to St. Louis on June 26, 2007.

== Waivers ==
Once an NHL player has played in a certain number of games or a set number of seasons has passed since the signing of his first NHL contract (see here), that player must be offered to all of the other NHL teams before he can be assigned to a minor league affiliate.

Date	Player	New team	Previous team
September 27, 2006	Karl Stewart	Pittsburgh Penguins	Anaheim Ducks
September 28, 2006	Patrick Traverse	Montreal Canadiens	San Jose Sharks
September 27, 2006	Karl Stewart	Chicago Blackhawks	Pittsburgh Penguins
October 3, 2006	Chris Thorburn	Pittsburgh Penguins	Buffalo Sabres
October 3, 2006	George Parros	Colorado Avalanche	Los Angeles Kings
October 4, 2006	Dany Sabourin	Vancouver Canucks	Pittsburgh Penguins
October 26, 2006	Karl Stewart	Chicago Blackhawks	Pittsburgh Penguins
October 31, 2006	Joel Perrault	St. Louis Blues	Phoenix Coyotes
November 11, 2006	Marty Murray	Los Angeles Kings	Philadelphia Flyers
November 27, 2006	Michael Leighton	Nashville Predators	Anaheim Ducks
December 2, 2006	Andre Roy	Tampa Bay Lightning	Pittsburgh Penguins
December 19, 2006	Joel Perrault	Phoenix Coyotes	St. Louis Blues
December 29, 2006	Jeff Cowan	Vancouver Canucks	Los Angeles Kings
December 30, 2006	Dmitry Afanasenkov	Philadelphia Flyers	Tampa Bay Lightning
January 2, 2007	Petr Nedved	Edmonton Oilers	Philadelphia Flyers
January 10, 2007	Travis Green	Toronto Maple Leafs	Anaheim Ducks
January 11, 2007	Michael Leighton	Philadelphia Flyers	Nashville Predators
January 12, 2007	Jason Krog	New York Rangers	Atlanta Thrashers
January 18, 2007	Sean Burke	Los Angeles Kings	Tampa Bay Lightning
February 10, 2007	Denis Hamel	Atlanta Thrashers	Ottawa Senators
February 24, 2007	Joey MacDonald	Boston Bruins	Detroit Red Wings
February 24, 2007	Nolan Baumgartner	Dallas Stars	Philadelphia Flyers
February 27, 2007	Jason Krog	New York Rangers	Atlanta Thrashers
February 27, 2007	Niko Kapanen	Phoenix Coyotes	Atlanta Thrashers
February 27, 2007	Michael Leighton	Montreal Canadiens	Philadelphia Flyers
February 27, 2007	Brian Boucher	Columbus Blue Jackets	Chicago Blackhawks
February 27, 2007	Denis Hamel	Philadelphia Flyers	Atlanta Thrashers

== See also ==
- 2006 NHL entry draft
- 2006 in sports
- 2007 in sports
- 2005–06 NHL transactions
