= Chris Pronger =

Canadian ice hockey player (born 1974)

- Hockey Hall of Fame, 2015
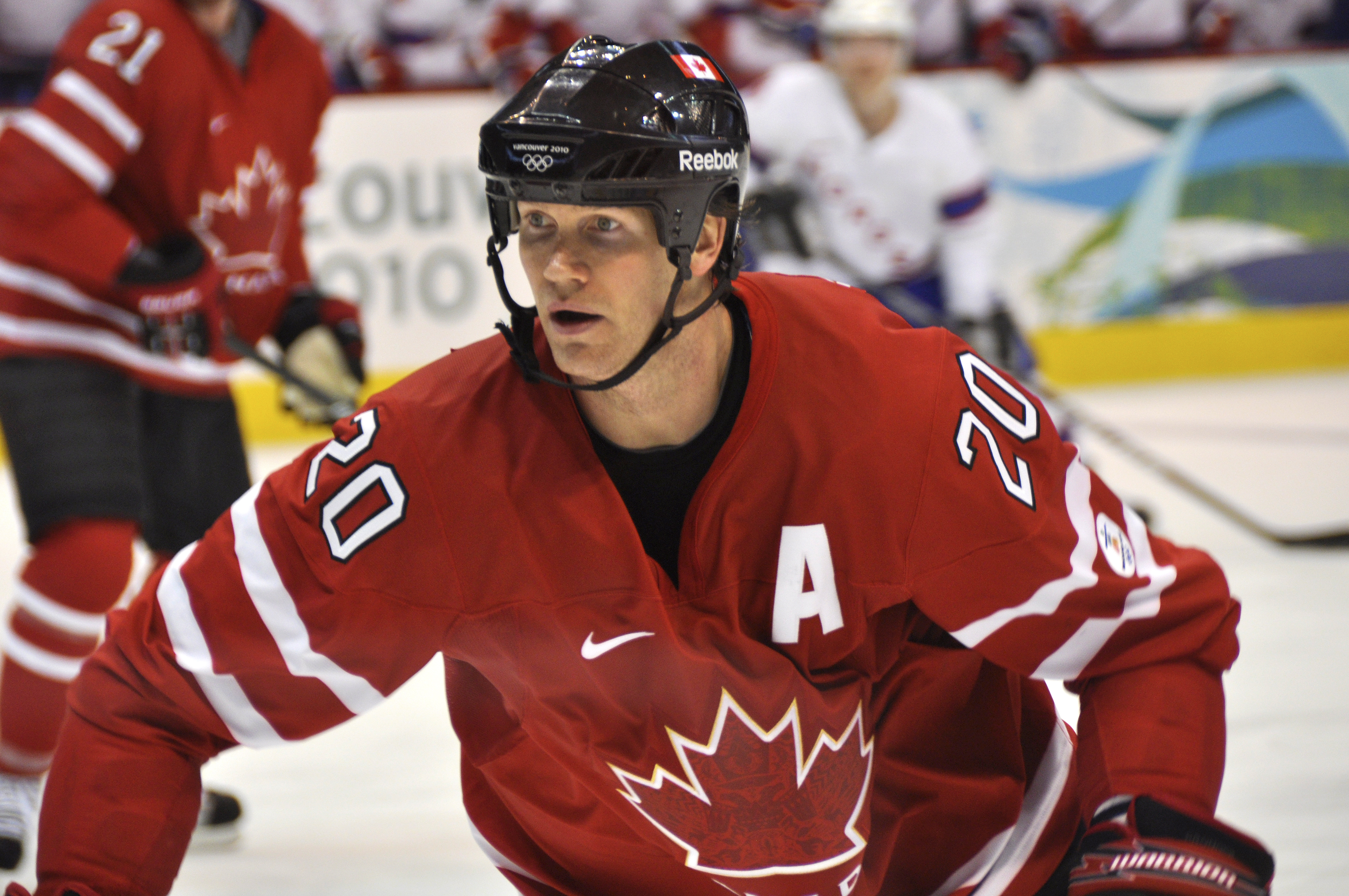
- Pronger with Canada in February 2010
- Born: October 10, 1974 (age 52) Dryden, Ontario, Canada
- Height: 6 ft 6 in (198 cm)
- Weight: 220 lb (100 kg; 15 st 10 lb)
- Position: Defence
- Shot: Left
- Played for: Hartford Whalers; St. Louis Blues; Edmonton Oilers; Anaheim Ducks; Philadelphia Flyers
- National team: Canada
- NHL draft: 2nd overall, 1993; Hartford Whalers
- Playing career: 1993–2012

Christopher Robert Pronger (/ˈprɒŋɡər/ or /ˈprɒŋər/; born October 10, 1974) is a Canadian former professional ice hockey defenceman. He won the Hart Memorial Trophy as the NHL's most valuable player for the 1999–2000 season and was inducted to the Hockey Hall of Fame in 2015. Pronger was later an advisor to the Florida Panthers of the National Hockey League (NHL).

Originally selected second overall by the Hartford Whalers in the 1993 NHL entry draft, Pronger played for Hartford, the St. Louis Blues, Edmonton Oilers and Anaheim Ducks before being traded to the Philadelphia Flyers before the 2009–10 season. He was captain of the Blues, Ducks and Flyers. He appeared in the Stanley Cup Final with three different teams (Edmonton, Anaheim and Philadelphia), winning the Cup with the Ducks in 2007. Pronger won the Hart Memorial Trophy as the NHL's most valuable player for the 1999–2000 season, becoming the first defenceman to win the award since Bobby Orr in 1971–72. A mainstay on Canada national team, Pronger won Olympic gold medals at the 2002 and 2010 Winter Olympics and is a member of the Triple Gold Club. In 2017, he was named one of the "100 Greatest NHL Players" in history.

Pronger's playing career ended in November 2011 due to post-concussion syndrome related to three separate hits suffered during his career; he also has vision impairment due to being hit in the eye(s) by the blade of another player's stick. In October 2014, Pronger signed a contract with the NHL to assist its Player Safety Division.

Pronger was suspended eight times during his NHL career.

The St. Louis Blues retired Pronger's No. 44 on January 17, 2022.

== Playing career ==
=== Early years ===
Pronger was born in Dryden, Ontario, to Jim and Eila Pronger, an immigrant from Pori, Finland. Pronger is Finnish Canadian. Before entering the junior ranks in Ontario, he grew up playing minor hockey in his hometown. As a 15-year-old, he was identified through the Ontario U-17 program and signed with the Stratford Cullitons Jr. B (OHA) club for the 1990–91 season. One of his defence partners in Stratford was future NHLer Greg de Vries.

In May 1991, Pronger indicated he was going to join his older brother Sean at Bowling Green State University to play in the NCAA instead of opting to play in the Ontario Hockey League (OHL). Regardless of his pre-draft indications, the Peterborough Petes selected Pronger in the sixth round in the OHL Priority Selection. Contrary to his initial intentions, Pronger reported to Peterborough.

After two stand-out seasons with Peterborough, and because of being highly regarded for his rare combination of imposing size, speed, offensive skill (particularly on the power play) and physicality, Pronger was selected second overall by the Hartford Whalers in the 1993 NHL entry draft, behind Alexandre Daigle, who made the infamous statement, "I'm glad I got drafted first, because no one remembers number two."

=== Hartford Whalers (1993–1995) ===
Pronger made his debut in the 1993–94 NHL season, playing 81 games for the Whalers and earning a spot on the NHL All-Rookie Team. However, he was one of multiple Whalers that season with off-ice issues, being one of six players arrested for a barroom brawl in Buffalo in late March (the brawl also involved a Whalers assistant coach), and then being arrested for drunk driving in Ohio three days after his rookie season ended, leading some to consider Pronger impatient and immature. On his rookie season, then-teammate Kelly Chase said, "You could see [Pronger] had talent, but it was a ho-hum thing. He really didn't have any direction. He was under a lot of pressure and just wasn't ready for the responsibility. Of course that team wasn't exactly overloaded with players who knew how to win" (the Whalers finished second-last in the Eastern Conference that season). After a second season in Hartford, on July 27, 1995, he was traded to the St. Louis Blues in exchange for star forward Brendan Shanahan.

=== St. Louis Blues (1995–2004) ===
In the early years of his St. Louis career, Pronger played under coach and general manager Mike Keenan, who insisted he improve his conditioning and reduce his mistakes. Late in his first season in St. Louis, the acquisition of Wayne Gretzky took pressure off Pronger which, combined with Keenan's practices, allowed Pronger to concentrate on improving his defensive play.

In his third season with St. Louis and first as team captain, Pronger was again named to the All-Star team. That year during the 1998 Stanley Cup playoffs, he had a cardiac arrest caused by commotio cordis when he was hit in the chest with a puck in a game against the Detroit Red Wings. Prior to this, he played for the Canadian Olympic team in the 1998 Winter Olympics. In 1999–2000, Pronger recorded a career-high 62 points and a +52 rating. His efforts won him the Norris and Hart trophies at the end of the season. Pronger beat Art Ross winner Jaromír Jágr by just one point in Hart Trophy voting, which was, at the time, the smallest margin of victory in the history of the award. (Two years later, Jarome Iginla and José Théodore tied in overall voting; Théodore won with more first-place votes.) Pronger was also named to the first All-Star team.

Pronger scored 47 points the next season, but appeared in only 51 games due to injury problems. In February 2002, he won a gold medal with Canada at the 2002 Winter Olympics. That same year in the NHL, he had another fine season and played in the All-Star Game once again. But injuries became a problem again in 2002–03, limiting him to just five games played, during which time Al MacInnis replaced him as captain. (Note: Al MacInnis served as interim captain for nearly the entire 2002–03 NHL season, while Pronger was injured and out of the line-up. Pronger resigned the captaincy at the start of the 2003–04 NHL season, in favour of MacInnis.) Pronger bounced back with another quality season in 2003–04. Following the 2004–05 NHL lockout and the imposition of an NHL salary cap, the Blues traded Pronger to the Edmonton Oilers in exchange for defencemen Eric Brewer, Jeff Woywitka and Doug Lynch. While the Blues needed to reduce team salaries to make it easier to sell the team, the Oilers were able to sign Pronger to a five-year, $31.25 million contract.

=== Edmonton Oilers (2005–2006) ===
Pronger was selected to play for Canada at the 2006 Winter Olympics, marking his third consecutive Winter Olympic Games. The Oilers went to the Stanley Cup Final that same year. On June 5, 2006, in game one of the Stanley Cup Final against the Carolina Hurricanes, Pronger became the first player in NHL history to score a penalty shot goal in a Stanley Cup Final game. The Oilers lost in game seven, with Pronger scoring a team-high 21 points (5 goals and 16 assists) in 24 playoff games, as well as a team-leading plus/minus rating of +10 during the playoffs.

On June 23, 2006, Pronger requested a trade through his agent, Pat Morris, from the Edmonton Oilers. Edmonton GM Kevin Lowe said the request was for personal reasons, while media outlets reported that Pronger's wife, Lauren, was not happy in Edmonton. The controversy surrounding Pronger's trade request has led many to describe him as "Public Enemy No. 1" in Edmonton.

On July 3, Pronger was traded to the Anaheim Ducks in exchange for forward Joffrey Lupul, defensive prospect Ladislav Šmíd, Anaheim's 2007 first-round draft pick (traded to the Phoenix Coyotes, which selected Nick Ross), a conditional first-round draft pick (contingent on the Ducks reaching the Stanley Cup Final within the next three seasons, which they did; the pick was used to select Jordan Eberle), and Anaheim's 2008 second-round draft pick (later traded to the New York Islanders).

=== Anaheim Ducks (2006–2009) ===
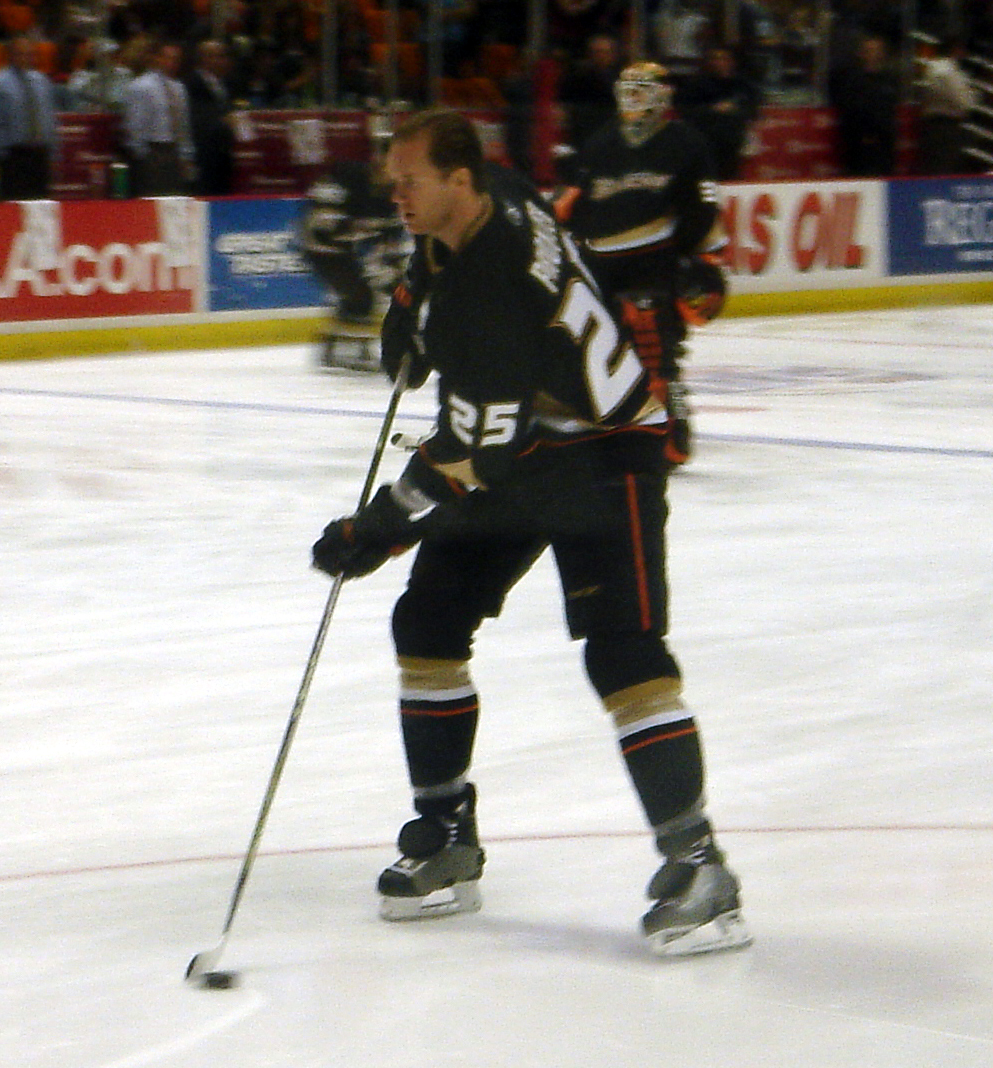
Chris Pronger with the Anaheim Ducks in April 2007

In 2007, Pronger played an important role for the Ducks run as they won the Stanley Cup. It was also Pronger's second-straight Final appearance. During the Conference Final, Pronger was suspended for one game for a check on Detroit Red Wings winger Tomas Holmström. He later criticized the Canadian media's coverage of the incident. In the final round, Pronger was suspended for one game for elbowing Ottawa Senators winger Dean McAmmond in the head during game three. With the Stanley Cup victory, he became a member of the Triple Gold Club.

On September 28, 2007, Pronger was named captain of the Ducks, replacing Scott Niedermayer, who sat out the beginning of the 2007–08 season. Although Niedermayer returned to the lineup later in the season, Pronger remained captain until the start of next season, when Niedermayer was renamed captain. Pronger retained a role as alternate captain.

On March 12, 2008, Pronger was involved in an incident with Vancouver's Ryan Kesler. Pronger, after being tangled up with Kesler behind the Anaheim blue line, stomped unnecessarily on Kesler's leg. Kesler was not injured and upon initial review the NHL did not suspend Pronger. However, upon new video evidence which provided a better angle, the NHL again reviewed the incident and issued Pronger an eight-game suspension. The suspension was criticized by some as insufficient, as Chris Simon had received a 30-game suspension for a stomp earlier that season, with some suggesting the NHL gave preferential treatment towards Pronger as an NHL MVP and an "ambassador for the game". He returned to the ice April 6 against the Phoenix Coyotes in Anaheim's last regular-season game of the year.

The 2008–09 season was quite successful for Pronger, who played his 1,000th career game on February 20, 2009. The Ducks would rally late in the season to jump into eighth place of the Western Conference. They dispatched the Presidents' Trophy-winning San Jose Sharks in six games before falling to the Detroit Red Wings in seven games. Pronger had 2 goals and 8 assists in 13 playoff games.

=== Philadelphia Flyers (2009–2012) ===
On June 27, 2009, Pronger along with forward Ryan Dingle was traded to the Philadelphia Flyers in exchange for Joffrey Lupul (earlier traded to Edmonton for Pronger in 2006), defenceman Luca Sbisa, two first-round draft picks, and a conditional third-round pick. Ten days later, Pronger signed a seven-year contract extension. Nearly a month after signing, the NHL announced they had launched an investigation on Pronger's contract to determine whether it circumvented the NHL collective bargaining agreement's salary cap. Because the contract was front-loaded, with annual salaries of just $525,000 in the final two years and was set to expire when Pronger turned 42, the investigation was launched with the focus on the potential for negotiations between Pronger and the Flyers to retire before the contract expired. However, as Pronger's contract took effect after his 35th birthday, under the terms of the current collective bargaining agreement, his over-35 contract cannot be deleted from the Flyers' cap space unless he is placed on long-term injured reserve, and even then it would come back on the team's cap space during the off-season.

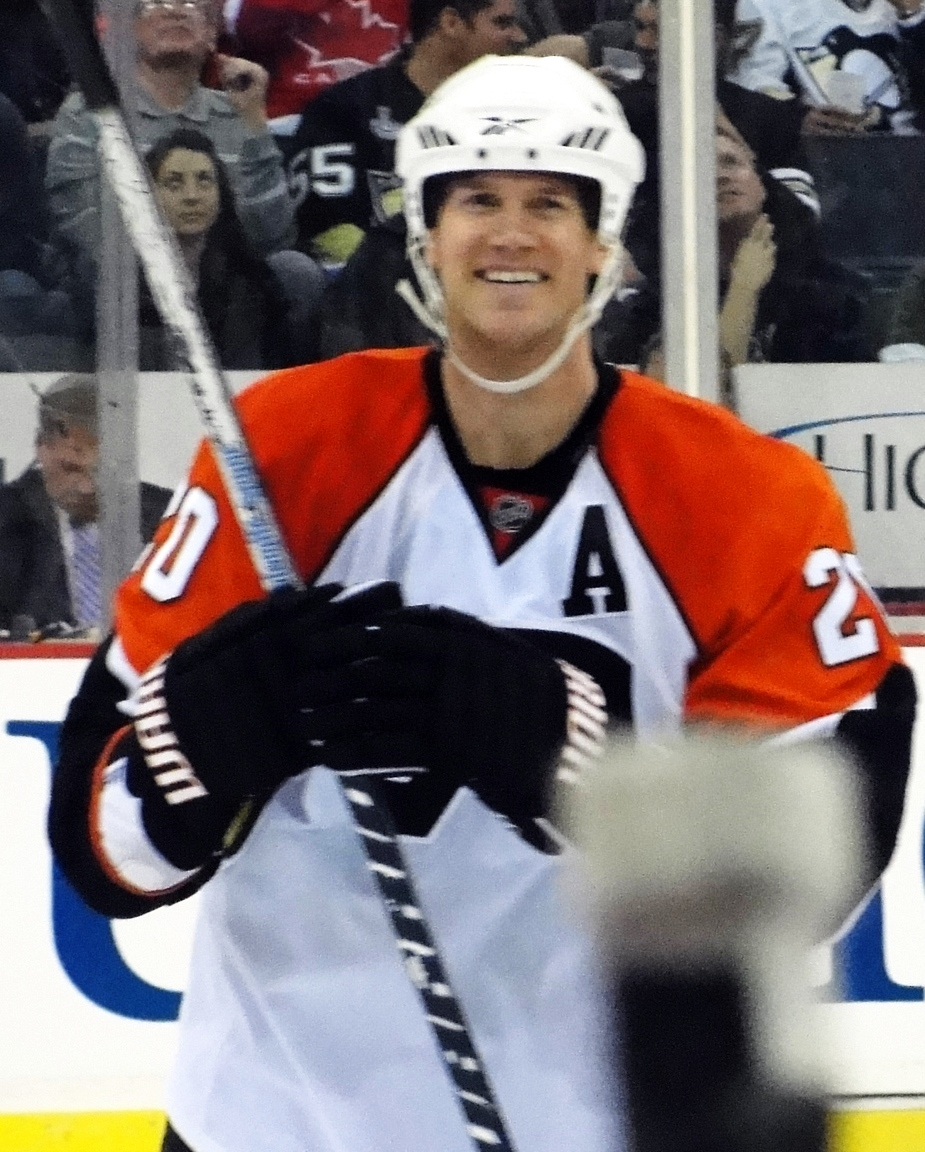
Pronger with the Philadelphia Flyers in March 2010

On December 30, 2009, Pronger was selected to play for Canada at the 2010 Winter Olympics. He served as one of the team's alternate captains, along with Sidney Crosby and Jarome Iginla. The team won the gold medal that year. After playing in his 25th Olympic game for Canada on February 28, 2010, Pronger became Canada's all-time leader in Winter Olympic Games played.

In the NHL regular season, the Flyers qualified for the 2010 playoffs on the last day of the season with a shootout win against the New York Rangers. A playoff run marked by an upset of the New Jersey Devils, a historic comeback against the Boston Bruins from down three games to none in the series and a five-game win over the Montreal Canadiens culminated in the Flyers playing the Chicago Blackhawks in the 2010 Stanley Cup Final. Although the Flyers lost the series four games to two, Pronger had a strong playoff performance and led a team that traded for him to the Finals for the third time in a row. Conversely, no team that traded Pronger away qualified for the playoffs the following year.

Following the playoffs, Pronger underwent arthroscopic knee surgery. He missed the first two games of the 2010–11 season. Various other injuries would limit Pronger to just 50 games, marking the first time that he missed significant time since the 2002–03 season (when he missed 77 games). On September 16, 2011, Pronger was named the 18th captain in Flyers history, replacing Mike Richards (who was traded to the Los Angeles Kings just prior to the 2011 NHL entry draft). On October 24, 2011, Maple Leafs center Mikhail Grabovski caught Pronger's right eye with his stick while following through on a shot. He would miss the next six games with a serious eye injury and concussion. Multiple hits resulting in post-concussion syndrome (the last being a collision with Martin Hanzal) limited Pronger to 13 games for the season in mid-December, placing Pronger's playing career in jeopardy. He also continued to have problems in his right eye.

With a resumption of his playing career looking unlikely, Pronger stepped down as team captain and was succeeded by Claude Giroux on January 15, 2013. However, Pronger did not officially retire from the NHL because his contract ran through to the 2016–17 season. Under the terms of the NHL collective bargaining agreement, because he was at least 35 years old before the contract began, the Flyers were on the hook for the $4.9 million cost against the salary cap each season, though they were able to receive relief by placing Pronger on long-term injured reserve at the start of each season. Had Pronger formally retired, the Flyers would lose that ability and his contract amount would have counted in full against the cap and he would not receive the remainder of the amounts owed to him under the contract ($12.15 million at the start of the 2013–14 season). While no longer playing, Pronger remained with the Flyers organization helping to scout and interview prospects.

On June 27, 2015, the Philadelphia Flyers traded Pronger's playing rights (alongside Nicklas Grossmann) to the Arizona Coyotes for Sam Gagner and a conditional draft pick. The deal was made to the benefit of salary cap implications to each club, as Pronger never played for Arizona. Three days later, on June 30, 2015, he was named to the Hockey Hall of Fame; because the Hall only counts games played as its criteria for the minimum waiting period, Pronger was eligible for induction though he was still technically an active player, as he had not played a game in three full seasons at the time of his induction.

== Post-playing career ==
After his contract expired following the 2017 NHL entry draft, on June 22, Pronger was able to officially retire and he signed with the Florida Panthers to become the organization's senior advisor of hockey operations.

Pronger was added to Amazon Prime's Monday Night Hockey announcing team for the 2025–26 season.

In 2026, Pronger released a memoir, Earned: The True Cost of Greatness From One of Hockey's Fiercest Competitors.

== Personal life ==
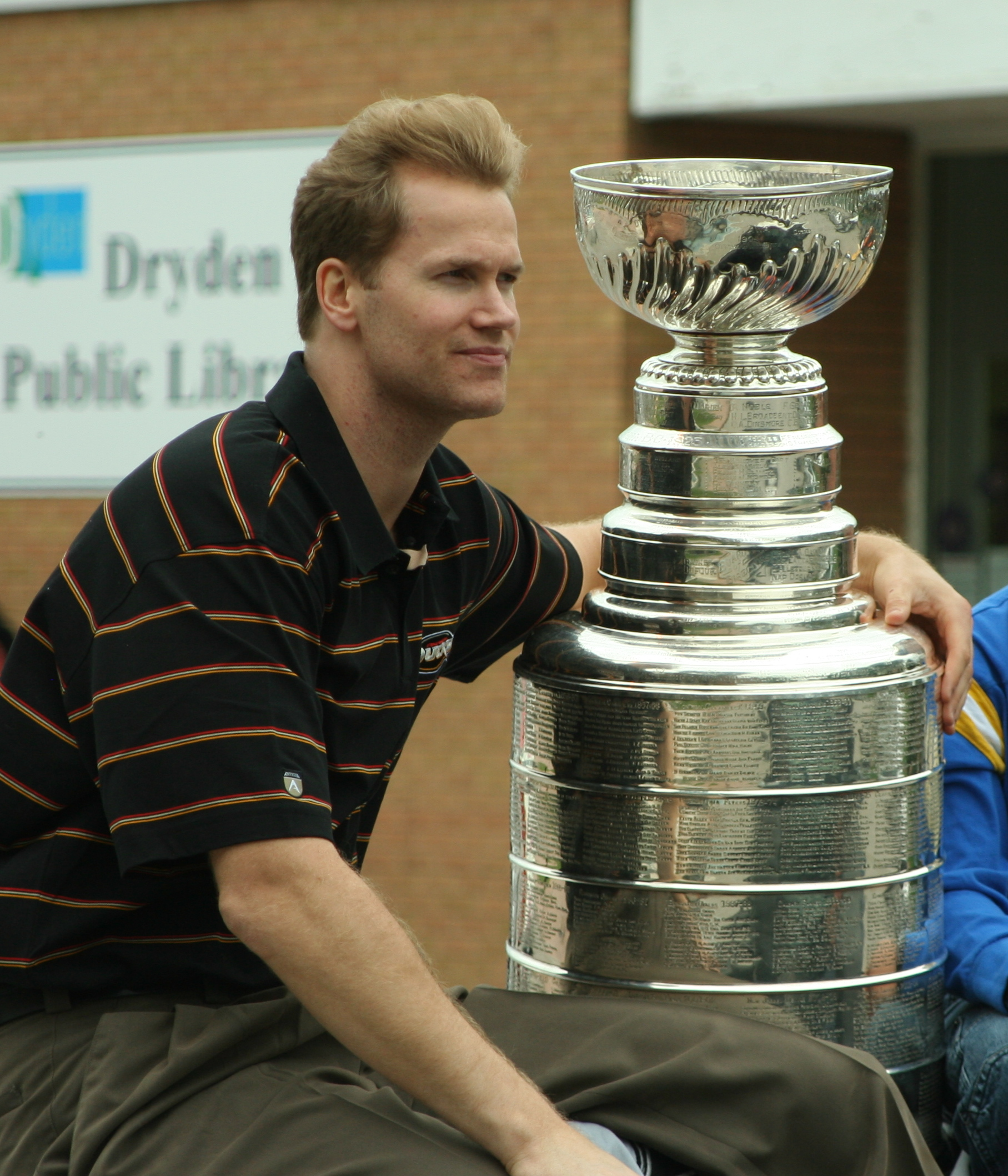
Pronger in 2007 after winning the Stanley Cup with the Anaheim Ducks in June 2007

Pronger married his wife Lauren in 1999, and together the couple have three children. He lived in Irvine, California, while playing for the Anaheim Ducks. Since 2021, he resides in the suburbs of St. Louis, where he runs a luxury travel agency alongside his wife.

Pronger appeared on the cover of NHL 2000 and NHL Hitz 2003.

His older brother is former NHL player Sean Pronger.

== Career statistics ==
=== Regular season and playoffs ===
			Regular season					Playoffs
Season	Team	League	GP	G	A	Pts	PIM	GP	G	A	Pts	PIM
1990–91	Stratford Cullitons	MWJHL	48	15	37	52	132	—	—	—	—	—
1991–92	Peterborough Petes	OHL	63	17	45	62	90	10	1	8	9	28
1992–93	Peterborough Petes	OHL	61	15	62	77	108	21	15	25	40	51
1993–94	Hartford Whalers	NHL	81	5	25	30	113	—	—	—	—	—
1994–95	Hartford Whalers	NHL	43	5	9	14	54	—	—	—	—	—
1995–96	St. Louis Blues	NHL	78	7	18	25	110	13	1	5	6	16
1996–97	St. Louis Blues	NHL	79	11	24	35	143	6	1	1	2	22
1997–98	St. Louis Blues	NHL	81	9	27	36	180	10	1	9	10	26
1998–99	St. Louis Blues	NHL	67	13	33	46	113	13	1	4	5	28
1999–2000	St. Louis Blues	NHL	79	14	48	62	92	7	3	4	7	32
2000–01	St. Louis Blues	NHL	51	8	39	47	75	15	1	7	8	32
2001–02	St. Louis Blues	NHL	78	7	40	47	120	9	1	7	8	24
2002–03	St. Louis Blues	NHL	5	1	3	4	10	7	1	3	4	14
2003–04	St. Louis Blues	NHL	80	14	40	54	88	5	0	1	1	16
2005–06	Edmonton Oilers	NHL	80	12	44	56	74	24	5	16	21	26
2006–07	Anaheim Ducks	NHL	66	13	46	59	69	19	3	12	15	26
2007–08	Anaheim Ducks	NHL	72	12	31	43	128	6	2	3	5	12
2008–09	Anaheim Ducks	NHL	82	11	37	48	88	13	2	8	10	12
2009–10	Philadelphia Flyers	NHL	82	10	45	55	79	23	4	14	18	36
2010–11	Philadelphia Flyers	NHL	50	4	21	25	44	3	0	1	1	4
2011–12	Philadelphia Flyers	NHL	13	1	11	12	10	—	—	—	—	—
NHL totals			1,167	157	541	698	1,590	173	26	95	121	326

=== International ===
Medal record

Men's ice hockey

Representing Canada

Winter Olympics
Gold medal – first place	2002 Salt Lake City	
Gold medal – first place	2010 Vancouver	

World Championships
Gold medal – first place	1997 Finland	

World Junior Championships
Gold medal – first place	1993 Sweden	

Year	Team	Event	Result	GP	G	A	Pts	PIM
1993	Canada	WJC	1st place, gold medalist(s)	7	1	3	4	6
1997	Canada	WC	1st place, gold medalist(s)	9	0	2	2	4
1998	Canada	OG	4th	6	0	0	0	4
2002	Canada	OG	1st place, gold medalist(s)	6	0	1	1	2
2006	Canada	OG	7th	6	1	2	3	16
2010	Canada	OG	1st place, gold medalist(s)	7	0	5	5	2
Junior totals				7	1	3	4	6
Senior totals				34	1	10	11	36

=== All-Star Games ===
Year	Location	G	A	Pts
1999	Tampa Bay	0	2	2
2000	Toronto	0	0	0
2001	Colorado	—	—	—
2002	Los Angeles	0	1	1
2004	Minnesota	0	0	0
2008	Atlanta	0	0	0
All-Star totals		0	3	3

== Awards and honours ==
Award	Year	Ref
CHL/OHL
Max Kaminsky Trophy	1993	
Plus-Minus Award	1993	
First All-Star team	1993	
CHL Defenceman of the Year	1993	
NHL
Stanley Cup champion	2007	
James Norris Memorial Trophy	2000	
Hart Memorial Trophy	2000	
Plus-Minus Award	1998, 2000	
All-Star Game	1999, 2000, 2001, (Note: Voted in as starter but injured.) 2002, 2004, 2008	
All-Rookie Team	1994	
First All-Star team	2000	
Second All-Star team	1998, 2004, 2007	
Hockey Hall of Fame	2015	
International
IIHF All-Time Canada Team	2020	

== Suspensions ==
Oct. 29, 1995: with St. Louis — four games, slashing (Washington's Pat Peake)
Dec. 17, 1998: with St. Louis — four games, high stick (Phoenix's Jeremy Roenick)
Oct. 11, 2000: with St. Louis — one game, leaving bench for altercation (Los Angeles' Kelly Buchberger)
April 3, 2002: with St. Louis — two games, cross-check (Dallas' Brenden Morrow)
March 14, 2004: with St. Louis — one game, kicking (Calgary's Ville Nieminen)
May 15, 2007: with Anaheim — one playoff game, blow to the head (Detroit's Tomas Holmstrom)
June 3, 2007: with Anaheim — one playoff game, blow to the head (Ottawa's Dean McAmmond)
March 12, 2008: with Anaheim — eight games, stomping on the leg (Vancouver's Ryan Kesler)

== Transactions ==
- June 26, 1993 – Drafted by the Hartford Whalers in the first round, second overall.
- July 27, 1995 – Traded to the St. Louis Blues for Brendan Shanahan.
- August 3, 2005 – Traded to the Edmonton Oilers for Eric Brewer, Jeff Woywitka and Doug Lynch.
- July 3, 2006 – Traded to the Anaheim Ducks for Joffrey Lupul, Ladislav Šmíd, a first round pick in 2007 (Riley Nash), a 2008 second round pick (traded to New York Islanders, used to select Travis Hamonic) and a conditional first round pick for one of the 2008/2009/2010 drafts (conditions were met in 2008; pick was used to selected Jordan Eberle).
- June 26, 2009 – Traded to the Philadelphia Flyers along with Ryan Dingle for Joffrey Lupul, Luca Sbisa and Philadelphia's first-round pick in the 2009 NHL entry draft (later traded to Columbus, which selected John Moore) and the 2010 NHL entry draft (used to select Emerson Etem), and a conditional pick for either the 2010 NHL Entry Draft or the 2011 NHL entry draft (conditions were not satisfied).
- June 27, 2015 – Traded to the Arizona Coyotes along with Nicklas Grossmann for Sam Gagner and a conditional pick in either the 2016 or 2017 NHL entry draft.

== See also ==
- List of NHL players with 1,000 games played

== Notes ==
Awards and achievements
Preceded by Róbert Petrovický	Hartford Whalers first-round draft pick 1993	Succeeded by Jeff O'Neill
Preceded by Jaromír Jágr	Winner of the Hart Memorial Trophy; 2000	Succeeded by Joe Sakic
Preceded by Al MacInnis	Winner of the Norris Trophy; 2000	Succeeded by Nicklas Lidström
Preceded by John LeClair; John LeClair	Winner of the NHL Plus/Minus Award; 1998; 2000	Succeeded by John LeClair; Joe Sakic and Patrik Eliáš
Preceded by Mike Richards	Winner of the Bobby Clarke Trophy; 2010	Succeeded by Claude Giroux
Sporting positions
Preceded by Wayne Gretzky	St. Louis Blues captain 1997–2003	Succeeded by Al MacInnis
Preceded by Scott Niedermayer	Anaheim Ducks captain 2007–2008	Succeeded by Scott Niedermayer
Preceded by Mike Richards	Philadelphia Flyers captain 2011–2013	Succeeded by Claude Giroux
