= Sebastian Stefaniszin =

German ice hockey player (born 1987)

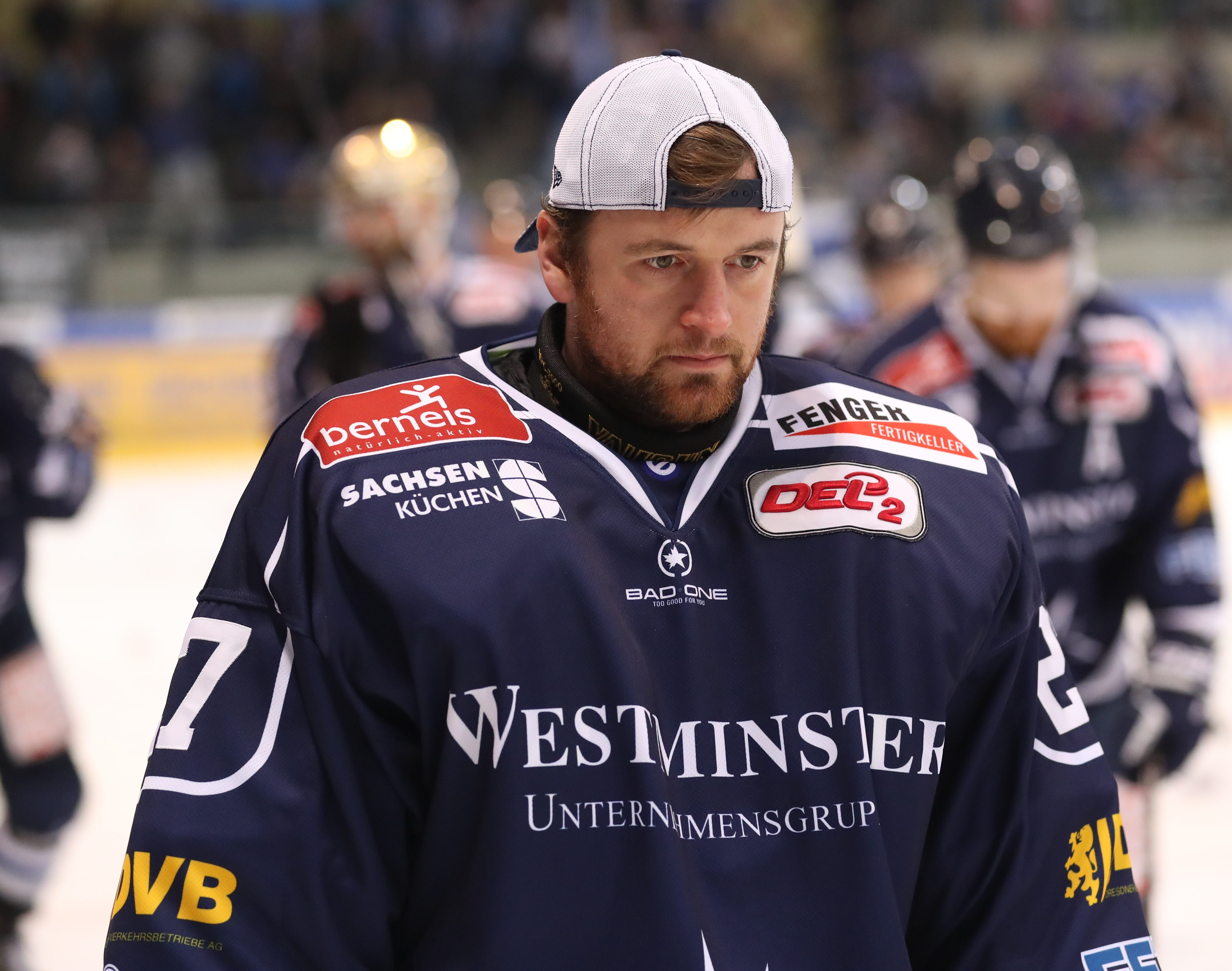
- Born: July 22, 1987 (age 39) Berlin, Germany
- Height: 6 ft 0 in (183 cm)
- Weight: 190 lb (86 kg; 13 st 8 lb)
- Position: Goaltender
- Shot: Left
- Played for: Eisbären Berlin; Iserlohn Roosters; Thomas Sabo Ice Tigers; Vienna Capitals; Graz 99ers Kölner Haie
- NHL draft: 98th overall, 2007; Anaheim Ducks
- Playing career: 2004–2019

Sebastian Stefaniszin (born July 22, 1987) is a German former professional ice hockey goaltender, who last played with Dresdner Eislöwen of the DEL2. He also played in the Deutsche Eishockey Liga (DEL).

== Playing career ==
Stefaniszin was drafted 98th overall in the 2007 NHL entry draft by the Anaheim Ducks.

Unsigned from the Ducks, Stefaniszin remained in Europe and he continued to play in the Deutsche Eishockey Liga for Eisbären Berlin. He later appeared with the Iserlohn Roosters. Before joining the Thomas Sabo Ice Tigers.

On June 19, 2014, Stefaniszin agreed to return to the DEL in signing a one-year contract with Kölner Haie.
