= Radim Ostrčil =

Czech ice hockey player

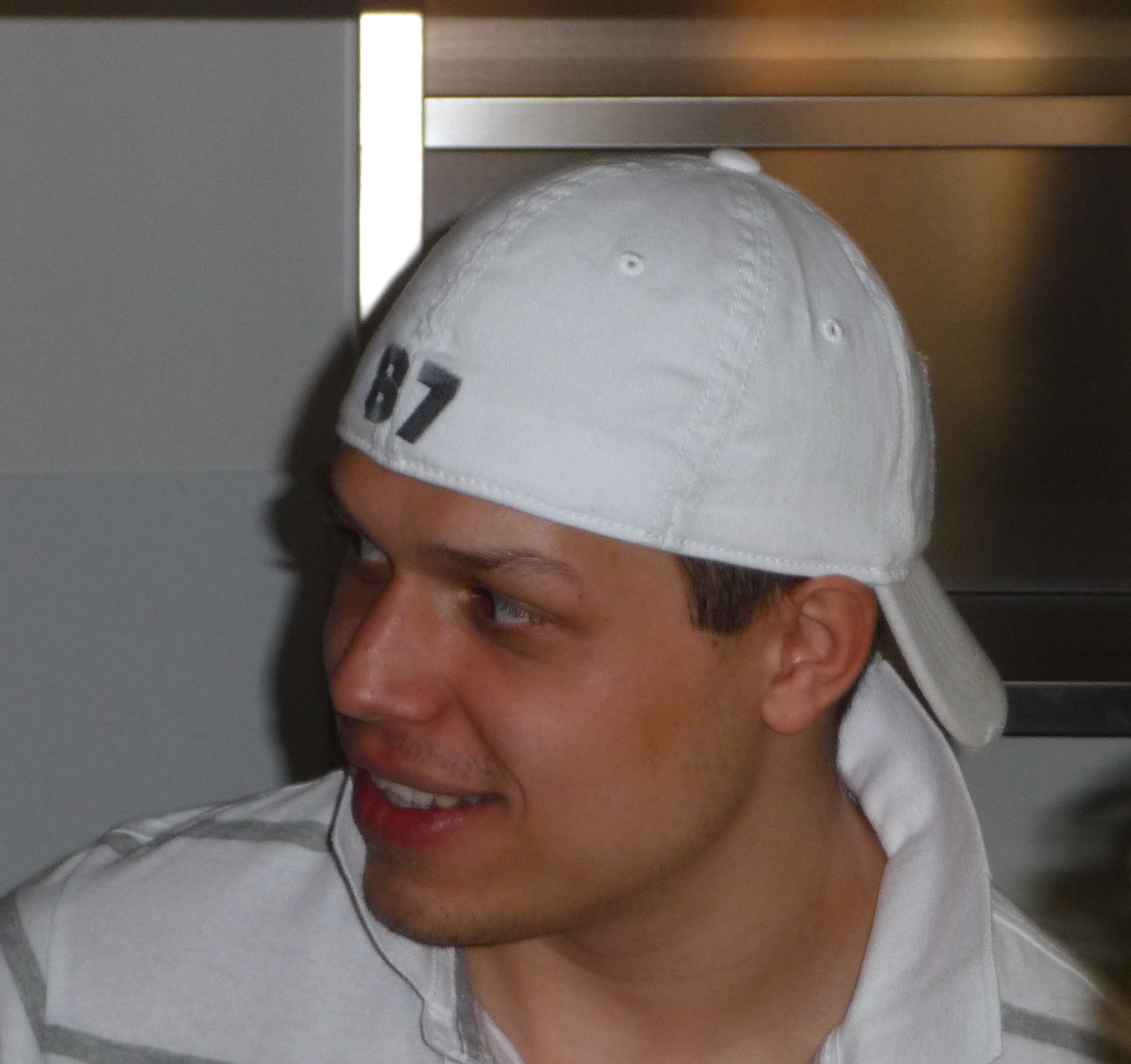
- Born: January 15, 1989 (age 37) Vsetín, Czechoslovakia
- Height: 6 ft 1 in (185 cm)
- Weight: 207 lb (94 kg; 14 st 11 lb)
- Position: Defence
- Shot: Left
- Played for: VHK Vsetín; HC Kometa Brno; MsHK Žilina
- NHL draft: 169th overall, 2007; Boston Bruins
- Playing career: 2005–2019

Radim Ostrčil (born January 15, 1989) is a Czech former professional ice hockey defenseman. He most recently played with VHK Vsetín in the Second National Hockey League (Czech.3).

He has formerly played with HC Vsetín and HC Olomouc. While formerly enjoying a spell in the Czech Extraliga with HC Kometa Brno. He was selected by the Boston Bruins in the 6th round (169th overall) of the 2007 NHL entry draft. After playing the following 2007–08 season of major junior hockey with the Ottawa 67's in the Ontario Hockey League, and with a contract with the Bruins unattainable, he opted to return to the Czech Republic.

== Career statistics ==
=== Regular season and playoffs ===
			Regular season					Playoffs
Season	Team	League	GP	G	A	Pts	PIM	GP	G	A	Pts	PIM
2002–03	HC Vsetín	CZE U18	33	1	2	3	8	11	1	1	2	2
2003–04	Vsetínská Hokejová	CZE U18	43	0	12	12	44	2	0	0	0	0
2004–05	Vsetínská Hokejová	CZE U18	31	8	15	23	85	3	1	3	4	4
2004–05	Vsetínská Hokejová	CZE U20	18	0	3	3	14	3	0	0	0	2
2005–06	Vsetínská Hokejová	CZE U18	1	1	1	2	0	3	2	2	4	0
2005–06	Vsetínská Hokejová	CZE U20	41	6	8	14	50	5	1	1	2	6
2005–06	Vsetínská Hokejová	ELH	3	0	0	0	6	—	—	—	—	—
2005–06	HC VČE Hradec Králové, a.s.	CZE.2	1	0	0	0	0	1	0	0	0	0
2006–07	Vsetínská Hokejová	CZE U20	25	8	13	21	69	8	4	4	8	6
2006–07	Vsetínská Hokejová	ELH	37	1	1	2	20	—	—	—	—	—
2007–08	Ottawa 67's	OHL	59	0	13	13	69	4	0	0	0	2
2008–09	HC Olomouc	CZE U20	5	3	2	5	10	—	—	—	—	—
2008–09	HC Olomouc	CZE.2	38	1	3	4	18	5	0	0	0	4
2009–10	SK Horácká Slavia Třebíč	CZE.2	41	1	12	13	38	11	2	5	7	12
2009–10	HC Kometa Brno	ELH	2	0	0	0	0	—	—	—	—	—
2010–11	HC Kometa Brno	ELH	7	0	0	0	4	—	—	—	—	—
2010–11	SK Horácká Slavia Třebíč	CZE.2	42	4	17	21	38	4	0	2	2	0
2011–12	HC Kometa Brno	ELH	2	0	0	0	2	—	—	—	—	—
2011–12	HC Rebel Havlíčkův Brod	CZE.2	32	2	9	11	32	5	1	2	3	8
2012–13	HC Rebel Havlíčkův Brod	CZE.2	52	5	14	19	36	1	0	0	0	12
2013–14	MsHK DOXXbet Žilina	SVK	56	2	10	12	54	—	—	—	—	—
2014–15	HC AZ Havířov 2010	CZE.2	40	3	8	11	38	3	0	1	1	0
2015–16	HC AZ Havířov 2010	CZE.2	21	1	4	5	12	—	—	—	—	—
2015–16	HC RT TORAX Poruba 2011	CZE.3	6	0	4	4	4	—	—	—	—	—
2015–16	VHK Vsetín	CZE.3	14	3	3	6	14	12	3	6	9	4
2016–17	VHK ROBE Vsetín	CZE.3	24	4	10	14	14	11	2	2	4	2
2017–18	VHK ROBE Vsetín	CZE.2	48	7	14	21	32	1	0	0	0	0
2018–19	HC Bobři Valašské Meziříčí	CZE.3	23	6	8	14	47	8	0	1	1	2
ELH totals			51	1	1	2	32	—	—	—	—	—
CZE.2 totals			315	24	81	105	244	31	3	10	13	26

=== International ===
Year	Team	Event	GP	G	A	Pts	PIM
2006	Czech Republic	IH18	4	1
2007	Czech Republic	WJC18	6	1	1	2	4
Junior totals			6	1	1	2	4
