= 2007 NHL entry draft =

2007 North American ice hockey draft

General information
- Date: June 22–23, 2007
- Location: Nationwide Arena; Columbus, Ohio, U.S.

Overview
- 211 total selections in 7 rounds
- First selection: (United States) Patrick Kane (Chicago Blackhawks)

The 2007 NHL entry draft was the 45th draft for the National Hockey League. It was held at Nationwide Arena in Columbus, Ohio, on June 22, 2007. The draft consisted of seven rounds, with rounds two through seven taking place on June 23. The draft was televised on TSN and RDS, with the first round simulcasted in the United States on Versus and in Europe on NASN.

Columbus Blue Jackets' president and general manager Doug MacLean and the NHL announced the event on March 21, 2006. On March 13, 2007, it was reported that NHL owners had voted in favor of changes to the team ranking system which would begin at the 2007 draft. This draft marked the first time in NHL history in which American players were selected with the top two picks, with Patrick Kane and James van Riemsdyk being selected by the Chicago Blackhawks and Philadelphia Flyers, respectively. It also tied the record of the most Americans being selected in the first round with ten players.

As of 2026, there are 11 active NHL players from this draft year.

== Lottery system ==
Starting with the 2007 NHL entry draft, the Stanley Cup champion and runner-up will receive the 30th and 29th picks, respectively. The conference finalists will get the 28th and 27th picks, and all other playoff teams will get picks based on their regular season point totals, but with the division winners getting the latest picks even if they had fewer points during the regular season than a non-division winner.

The draft order of the first 14 picks was determined by a lottery involving the non-playoff teams on April 10.

Under the weighted lottery system, the club with the fewest regular-season points had the greatest chance (25%) of winning the Draft Drawing, have a 48.2% chance to pick first overall, and could pick no lower than second at the 2007 entry draft. The winner of the drawing would move up a maximum of four places, with all other clubs' draft order being adjusted accordingly (no team moving down more than one spot).

The Chicago Blackhawks, originally slated to draft in fifth place, won the lottery and as a result had the first overall pick in the draft.

== Draft day trades ==
=== June 22 ===
To Toronto Maple Leafs

Vesa Toskala
Mark Bell
To San Jose Sharks

1st round pick in 2007
(Lars Eller)
2nd round pick in 2007

(Aaron Palushaj)
4th round pick in 2009 (Craig Smith)

To Calgary Flames

Adrian Aucoin
7th round pick in 2007

(C. J. Severyn)

To Chicago Blackhawks

Andrei Zyuzin
Steve Marr
To Florida Panthers

Tomas Vokoun
To Nashville Predators

1st round pick in 2008

2nd round pick in 2007 (Nick Spaling)
2nd round pick in 2008 (Aaron Ness)

To Pittsburgh Penguins

3rd round pick in 2007

(Robert Bortuzzo)

To Atlanta Thrashers

Chris Thorburn
To San Jose Sharks

1st round pick in 2007

(Logan Couture)

To St. Louis Blues

1st round pick in 2007

(Lars Eller)
2nd round pick in 2007 (Aaron Palushaj)

To Minnesota Wild

1st round pick in 2007

(Colton Gillies)

To Anaheim Ducks

1st round pick in 2007

(Logan MacMillan)
2nd round pick in 2007
(Eric Tangradi)

To St. Louis Blues

1st round pick in 2007

(Ian Cole)

To Calgary Flames

1st round pick in 2007

(Mikael Backlund)
3rd round pick in 2007
(John Negrin)

To Edmonton Oilers

1st round pick in 2007
To Phoenix Coyotes

1st round pick in 2007
2nd round pick in 2007
To San Jose Sharks

1st round pick in 2007
To Washington Capitals

2nd round pick in 2007
2nd round pick in 2008

=== June 23 ===
To Boston Bruins 2nd round pick in 2007	To Chicago Blackhawks 2nd round pick in 2007; 3rd round pick in 2007
To Philadelphia Flyers 2nd round pick in 2007	To Washington Capitals 3rd round pick in 2007; 2nd round pick in 2008
To San Jose Sharks 3rd round pick in 2007	To Colorado Avalanche 4th round pick in 2007; 5th round pick in 2007; 6th round pick in 2008
To Columbus Blue Jackets 4th round pick in 2007	To Dallas Stars 5th round pick in 2007; 5th round pick in 2007; 5th round pick in 2007
To Los Angeles Kings 4th round pick in 2007	To Washington Capitals 6th round pick in 2007; 4th round pick in 2008
To Calgary Flames 4th round pick in 2007	To Buffalo Sabres 5th round pick in 2007; 5th round pick in 2007
To Calgary Flames 5th round pick in 2007	To Colorado Avalanche 6th round pick in 2007; 6th round pick in 2007
To Tampa Bay Lightning 5th round pick in 2007; 7th round pick in 2007; 7th round pick in 2007	To Ottawa Senators 4th round pick in 2008
To Boston Bruins 6th round pick in 2007	To Colorado Avalanche 6th round pick in 2008
To Carolina Hurricanes Michael Leighton	To Montreal Canadiens 7th round pick in 2007

== Central Scouting final rankings ==
Source: NHL Central Scouting Bureau

=== Skaters ===
	North American	European
1	(Canada) Kyle Turris (C)	(Sweden) Mikael Backlund (C)
2	(United States) Patrick Kane (RW)	(Russia) Alexei Cherepanov (RW)
3	(United States) James van Riemsdyk (LW)	(Denmark) Lars Eller (C/W)
4	(Canada) Keaton Ellerby (D)	(Russia) Maxim Mayorov (RW)
5	(Canada) Karl Alzner (D)	(Sweden) Joakim Andersson (C)
6	(Canada) Sam Gagner (C)	(Sweden) Simon Hjalmarsson (RW)
7	(Czech Republic) Jakub Voracek (RW)	(Sweden) Nichlas Torp (D)
8	(Canada) Angelo Esposito (C)	(Russia) Sergei Korostin (RW)
9	(Canada) Zach Hamill (C)	(Russia) Maxim Goncharov (D)
10	(Canada) David Perron (LW)	(Russia) Evgenii Dadonov (RW)

=== Goaltenders ===
	North American	European
1	(United States) Jeremy Smith	(Sweden) Joel Gistedt
2	(Canada) Trevor Cann	(Sweden) Mark Owuya
3	(Canada) Antoine Lafleur	(Czech Republic) Marek Benda

== Selections by round ==
= NHL All-Star team ·	= NHL All-Star (Note: Players are identified as an All-Star if they were selected for the All-Star game at any time in their career.) ·	= NHL All-Star and NHL All-Star team ·

=== Round one ===
#	Player	Nationality	NHL team	College/junior/club team
1	Patrick Kane (RW)	United States	Chicago Blackhawks	London Knights (OHL)
2	James van Riemsdyk (LW)	United States	Philadelphia Flyers	USA Hockey National Team Development Program (NAHL)
3	Kyle Turris (C)	Canada	Phoenix Coyotes	Burnaby Express (BCHL)
4	Thomas Hickey (D)	Canada	Los Angeles Kings	Seattle Thunderbirds (WHL)
5	Karl Alzner (D)	Canada	Washington Capitals	Calgary Hitmen (WHL)
6	Sam Gagner (C)	Canada	Edmonton Oilers	London Knights (OHL)
7	Jakub Voracek (RW)	Czech Republic	Columbus Blue Jackets	Halifax Mooseheads (QMJHL)
8	Zach Hamill (C)	Canada	Boston Bruins	Everett Silvertips (WHL)
9	Logan Couture (C)	Canada	San Jose Sharks (from St. Louis)^{1}	Ottawa 67's (OHL)
10	Keaton Ellerby (D)	Canada	Florida Panthers	Kamloops Blazers (WHL)
11	Brandon Sutter (C/RW)	Canada	Carolina Hurricanes	Red Deer Rebels (WHL)
12	Ryan McDonagh (D)	United States	Montreal Canadiens	Cretin-Derham Hall High School (MSHSL)
13	Lars Eller (C/W)	Denmark	St. Louis Blues (from Toronto via San Jose)^{2}	Frolunda HC Jr. (Sweden)
14	Kevin Shattenkirk (D)	United States	Colorado Avalanche	USA National Team Development Program (NAHL)
15	Alex Plante (D)	Canada	Edmonton Oilers (from NY Islanders)^{3}	Calgary Hitmen (WHL)
16	Colton Gillies (C)	Canada	Minnesota Wild (from Tampa Bay via Anaheim)^{4}	Saskatoon Blades (WHL)
17	Alexei Cherepanov (RW)	Russia	New York Rangers	Avangard Omsk (Russia)
18	Ian Cole (D)	United States	St. Louis Blues (from Calgary)^{5}	USA National Team Development Program (NAHL)
19	Logan MacMillan (C)	Canada	Anaheim Ducks (from Minnesota)^{6}	Halifax Mooseheads (QMJHL)
20	Angelo Esposito (C)	Canada	Pittsburgh Penguins	Quebec Remparts (QMJHL)
21	Riley Nash (C)	Canada	Edmonton Oilers (from Dallas via Phoenix)^{7}	Salmon Arm Silverbacks (BCHL)
22	Max Pacioretty (LW)	United States	Montreal Canadiens (from San Jose)^{8}	Sioux City Musketeers (USHL)
23	Jonathon Blum (D)	United States	Nashville Predators (from Nashville via Philadelphia)^{9}	Vancouver Giants (WHL)
24	Mikael Backlund (C)	Sweden	Calgary Flames (from Atlanta via St. Louis)^{10}	VIK Vasteras HK (Sweden)
25	Patrick White (C)	United States	Vancouver Canucks	Tri-City Storm (USHL)
26	David Perron (LW)	Canada	St. Louis Blues (from New Jersey via San Jose)^{11}	Lewiston Maineiacs (QMJHL)
27	Brendan Smith (D)	Canada	Detroit Red Wings	St. Michael's Buzzers (OPJHL)
28	Nick Petrecki (D)	United States	San Jose Sharks (from Buffalo via Washington)^{12}	Omaha Lancers (USHL)
29	Jim O'Brien (C)	United States	Ottawa Senators	USA National Team Development Program (NAHL)
30	Nick Ross (D)	Canada	Phoenix Coyotes (from Anaheim via Edmonton)^{13}	Regina Pats (WHL)

Notes

1. The St. Louis Blues' first-round pick went to the San Jose Sharks as the result of a trade on June 22, 2007 that sent Toronto's first and second-round picks in 2007 (13th and 44th overall) and a third-round pick in 2008 to St. Louis in exchange for this pick.
2. The Toronto Maple Leafs' first-round pick went to the St. Louis Blues as the result of a trade on June 22, 2007 that sent a first-round pick in 2007 (9th overall) to San Jose in exchange for Toronto's second-round pick in 2007 (44th overall), a third-round pick in 2008 and this pick.
  San Jose previously acquired this pick as the result of a trade on June 22, 2007 that sent Vesa Toskala and Mark Bell to Toronto in exchange for a second-round pick in 2007 (44th overall), a fourth-round pick in 2009 and this pick.
3. The New York Islanders' first-round pick went to the Edmonton Oilers as the result of a trade on February 27, 2007 that sent Ryan Smyth to New York in exchange for Robert Nilsson, Ryan O'Marra and this pick.
4. The Tampa Bay Lightning's first-round pick went to the Minnesota Wild as the result of a trade on June 22, 2007 that sent a first and compensatory second-round pick both in 2007 (19th and 42nd overall) to Anaheim in exchange for this pick.
  Anaheim previously acquired this pick as the result of a trade on February 24, 2007 that sent Shane O'Brien and Colorado's third-round pick in 2007 to Tampa Bay in exchange for Gerald Coleman and this pick.
5. The Calgary Flames' first-round pick went to the St. Louis Blues as the result of a trade on June 22, 2007 that sent Atlanta's first-round pick and a third-round pick both in 2007 (24th and 70th overall) to Calgary in exchange for this pick.
6. The Minnesota Wild's first-round pick went to the Anaheim Ducks as the result of a trade on June 22, 2007 that sent Tampa Bay's first-round pick in 2007 (16th overall) to Minnesota in exchange for a compensatory second-round pick in 2007 (42nd overall) and this pick.
7. The Dallas Stars' first-round pick went to the Edmonton Oilers as the result of a trade on June 22, 2007 that sent Anaheim's first-round pick and a second-round pick both in 2007 (30th and 36th overall) to Phoenix in exchange for this pick.
  Phoenix previously acquired this pick as the result of a trade on February 12, 2007 that sent Ladislav Nagy to Dallas in exchange for Mathias Tjarnqvist and this pick.
8. The San Jose Sharks' first-round pick went to the Montreal Canadiens as the result of a trade on February 25, 2007 that sent Craig Rivet and a fifth-round pick in 2008 to San Jose in exchange for Josh Gorges and this pick.
9. The Nashville Predators' first-round pick was re-acquired as the result of a trade on June 18, 2007 that sent Kimmo Timonen and Scott Hartnell to Philadelphia in exchange for this pick.
  Philadelphia previously acquired this pick as the result of a trade on February 15, 2007 that sent Peter Forsberg to Nashville in exchange for Ryan Parent, Scottie Upshall, a third-round pick in 2007 and this pick.
10. The Atlanta Thrashers' first-round pick went to the Calgary Flames as the result of a trade on June 22, 2007 that sent a first-round pick in 2007 (18th overall) to St. Louis in exchange for a third-round pick in 2007 (70th overall) and this pick.
  St. Louis previously acquired this pick as the result of a trade on February 25, 2007 that sent Keith Tkachuk to Atlanta in exchange for Glen Metropolit, a third-round pick in 2007, a conditional first-round pick in 2008, a second-round pick in 2008 and this pick.
11. The New Jersey Devils' first-round pick went to the St. Louis Blues as the result of a trade on February 27, 2007 that sent Bill Guerin to San Jose in exchange for Ville Nieminen, Jay Barriball and this pick.
  San Jose previously acquired this pick as the result of a trade on October 1, 2006 that sent Alexander Korolyuk and Jim Fahey to New Jersey in exchange for Vladimir Malakhov and this pick (being conditional at the time of the trade). The condition – San Jose will receive a first-round pick in 2007 if Malakhov does not resume his NHL career – was converted as Malakhov never played another game professionally after this trade.
12. The Buffalo Sabres' first-round pick went to the San Jose Sharks as the result of a trade on June 22, 2007 that sent Carolina's second-round pick in 2007 and a second-round pick in 2008 to Washington in exchange for this pick.
  Washington previously acquired this pick as the result of a trade on February 27, 2007 that sent Dainius Zubrus and Timo Helbling to Buffalo in exchange for Jiri Novotny and this pick.
13. The Anaheim Ducks' first-round pick went to the Phoenix Coyotes as the result of a trade on June 22, 2007 that sent Dallas' first-round pick in 2007 (21st overall) to Edmonton in exchange for a second-round pick in 2007 (36th overall) and this pick.
  Edmonton previously acquired this pick as the result of a trade on July 3, 2006 that sent Chris Pronger to Anaheim in exchange for Joffrey Lupul, Ladislav Smid, a conditional first-round pick in 2008, a second-round pick in 2008 and this pick.

=== Round two ===
#	Player	Nationality	NHL team	College/junior/club team
31	T. J. Brennan (D)	United States	Buffalo Sabres (from Philadelphia)	St. John's Fog Devils (QMJHL)
32	Brett MacLean (LW)	Canada	Phoenix Coyotes	Oshawa Generals (OHL)
33	Taylor Ellington (D)	Canada	Vancouver Canucks (from Los Angeles)	Everett Silvertips (WHL)
34	Josh Godfrey (D)	Canada	Washington Capitals	Sault Ste. Marie Greyhounds (OHL)
35	Tommy Cross (D)	United States	Boston Bruins (from Chicago)	Westminster School (USHS–CT)
36	Joel Gistedt (G)	Sweden	Phoenix Coyotes (from Edmonton)	Frolunda HC (Sweden)
37	Stefan Legein (RW)	Canada	Columbus Blue Jackets	Mississauga IceDogs (OHL)
38	Bill Sweatt (LW)	United States	Chicago Blackhawks (from Boston)	Colorado College (WCHA)
39	Simon Hjalmarsson (RW)	Sweden	St. Louis Blues	Frolunda HC Jr. (Sweden)
40	Michal Repik (RW)	Czech Republic	Florida Panthers	Vancouver Giants (WHL)
41	Kevin Marshall (D)	Canada	Philadelphia Flyers (from Carolina via Pittsburgh, San Jose and Washington)	Lewiston Maineiacs (QMJHL)
42	Eric Tangradi (C)	United States	Anaheim Ducks (from Minnesota; compensatory)	Belleville Bulls (OHL)
43	P. K. Subban (D)	Canada	Montreal Canadiens	Belleville Bulls (OHL)
44	Aaron Palushaj (RW)	United States	St. Louis Blues (from Toronto via San Jose)	Des Moines Buccaneers (USHL)
45	Colby Cohen (D)	United States	Colorado Avalanche	Lincoln Stars (USHL)
46	Theo Ruth (D)	United States	Washington Capitals (from NY Islanders)	US National Team Development Program (NAHL)
47	Dana Tyrell (C/RW)	Canada	Tampa Bay Lightning	Prince George Cougars (WHL)
48	Antoine Lafleur (G)	Canada	New York Rangers	P.E.I. Rocket (QMJHL)
49	Trevor Cann (G)	Canada	Colorado Avalanche (from Calgary)	Peterborough Petes (OHL)
50	Nico Sacchetti (C)	United States	Dallas Stars (from Minnesota)	Virginia High School (USHS–MN)
51	Keven Veilleux (C)	Canada	Pittsburgh Penguins	Victoriaville Tigres (QMJHL)
52	Oscar Moller (C)	Sweden	Los Angeles Kings (from Dallas)	Chilliwack Bruins (WHL)
53	Will Weber (D)	United States	Columbus Blue Jackets (from San Jose)	Gaylord High School (USHS–MI)
54	Jeremy Smith (G)	United States	Nashville Predators	Plymouth Whalers (OHL)
55	TJ Galiardi (F)	Canada	Colorado Avalanche (from Atlanta via Anaheim)	Dartmouth College (ECAC)
56	Akim Aliu (C/RW)	Canada	Chicago Blackhawks (from Vancouver)	Sudbury Wolves (OHL)
57	Mike Hoeffel (F)	United States	New Jersey Devils	US National Team Development Program (NAHL)
58	Nick Spaling (C)	Canada	Nashville Predators (from Detroit via Florida)	Kitchener Rangers (OHL)
59	Drew Schiestel (D)	Canada	Buffalo Sabres	Mississauga IceDogs (OHL)
60	Ruslan Bashkirov (LW)	Russia	Ottawa Senators	Quebec Remparts (QMJHL)
61	Wayne Simmonds (RW)	Canada	Los Angeles Kings (from Anaheim via Vancouver)	Sault Ste. Marie Greyhounds (OHL)

=== Round three ===
#	Player	Nationality	NHL team	College/junior/club team
62	Mark Katic (D)	Canada	New York Islanders (from Philadelphia)	Sarnia Sting (OHL)
63	Maxime Macenauer (C)	Canada	Anaheim Ducks (from Phoenix via Boston)	Rouyn-Noranda Huskies (QMJHL)
64	Sergei Korostin (RW)	Russia	Dallas Stars (from Los Angeles)	Dynamo Moscow (Russia)
65	Olivier Fortier (C)	Canada	Montreal Canadiens (from Washington)	Rimouski Oceanic (QMJHL)
66	Garrett Klotz (LW)	Canada	Philadelphia Flyers (from Chicago)	Saskatoon Blades (WHL)
67	Spencer Machacek (RW)	Canada	Atlanta Thrashers (from Edmonton via Minnesota)	Vancouver Giants (WHL)
68	Jake Hansen (F)	United States	Columbus Blue Jackets	Sioux Falls Stampede (USHL)
69	Maxime Tanguay (C)	Canada	Chicago Blackhawks (from Boston)	Rimouski Oceanic (QMJHL)
70	John Negrin (D)	Canada	Calgary Flames (from St. Louis)	Kootenay Ice (WHL)
71	Evgenii Dadonov (RW)	Russia	Florida Panthers	Traktor Chelyabinsk (Russia)
72	Drayson Bowman (LW)	United States	Carolina Hurricanes	Spokane Chiefs (WHL)
73	Yannick Weber (D)	Switzerland	Montreal Canadiens	Kitchener Rangers (OHL)
74	Dale Mitchell (RW)	Canada	Toronto Maple Leafs	Oshawa Generals (OHL)
75	Luca Cunti (C/LW)	Switzerland	Tampa Bay Lightning (from Colorado via Anaheim)	Dubendorf (Switzerland)
76	Jason Gregoire (LW)	Canada	New York Islanders	Lincoln Stars (USHL)
77	Alex Killorn (C)	Canada	Tampa Bay Lightning	Deerfield Academy (USHS–MA)
78	Robert Bortuzzo (D)	Canada	Pittsburgh Penguins (from NY Rangers via Atlanta)	Kitchener Rangers (OHL)
79	Nick Palmieri (RW)	United States	New Jersey Devils (from Calgary)	Erie Otters (OHL)
80	Casey Pierro-Zabotel (C)	Canada	Pittsburgh Penguins (from Minnesota)	Merritt Centennials (BCHL)
81	Ryan Thang (LW)	United States	Nashville Predators (from Pittsburgh)	University of Notre Dame (CCHA)
82	Bryan Cameron (C/RW)	Canada	Los Angeles Kings (from Dallas)	Belleville Bulls (OHL)
83	Timo Pielmeier (G)	Germany	San Jose Sharks	Kolner Haie (Germany)
84	Phil DeSimone (C)	United States	Washington Capitals (from Nashville via Philadelphia)	Sioux City Musketeers (USHL)
85	Brett Sonne (C/LW)	Canada	St. Louis Blues (from Atlanta)	Calgary Hitmen (WHL)
86	Josh Unice (G)	United States	Chicago Blackhawks (from Vancouver)	US National Development Program (NAHL)
87	Corbin McPherson (D)	United States	New Jersey Devils	Cowichan Valley Capitals (BCHL)
88	Joakim Andersson (C)	Sweden	Detroit Red Wings	Frolunda HC Jr. (Sweden)
89	Corey Tropp (RW)	United States	Buffalo Sabres	Sioux Falls Stampede (USHL)
90	Louie Caporusso (C/LW)	Canada	Ottawa Senators	St. Michael's Buzzers (OPJHL)
91	Tyson Sexsmith (G)	Canada	San Jose Sharks (from Anaheim via Colorado)	Vancouver Giants (WHL)

=== Round four ===
#	Player	Nationality	NHL team	College/junior/club team
92	Justin Vaive (LW)	United States	Anaheim Ducks (from Philadelphia)	US National Team Development Program (NAHL)
93	Steven Kampfer (D)	United States	Anaheim Ducks (from Phoenix)	University of Michigan (CCHA)
94	Maxim Mayorov (F)	Russia	Columbus Blue Jackets (from Los Angeles via Dallas)	Neftyanik Leninogorsk (Russia)
95	Alec Martinez (D)	United States	Los Angeles Kings (from Washington)	Miami University (CCHA)
96	Cade Fairchild (D)	United States	St. Louis Blues (from Chicago via Carolina)	US National Team Development Program (NAHL)
97	Linus Omark (F)	Sweden	Edmonton Oilers	Lulea HF (Sweden)
98	Sebastian Stefaniszin (G)	Germany	Anaheim Ducks (from Columbus)	Eisbaren Berlin (DEL)
99	Matt Frattin (RW)	Canada	Toronto Maple Leafs (from Boston via Phoenix)	Fort Saskatchewan Traders (AJHL)
100	Travis Erstad (C/RW)	United States	St. Louis Blues	Lincoln Stars (USHL)
101	Matt Rust (C)	United States	Florida Panthers (from Florida via Pittsburgh)	US National Team Development Program (NAHL)
102	Justin McCrae (C)	Canada	Carolina Hurricanes	Saskatoon Blades (WHL)
103	Vladimir Ruzicka (C)	Czech Republic	Phoenix Coyotes (from Montreal)	Slavia Prague (Czech Republic)
104	Ben Winnett (LW)	Canada	Toronto Maple Leafs	Salmon Arm Silverbacks (BCHL)
105	Brad Malone (C/LW)	Canada	Colorado Avalanche	Sioux Falls Stampede (USHL)
106	Maxim Gratchev (LW)	Russia	New York Islanders	Rimouski Oceanic (QMJHL)
107	Mitch Fadden (C)	Canada	Tampa Bay Lightning	Lethbridge Hurricanes (WHL)
108	Brett Bruneteau (C)	United States	Washington Capitals (from NY Rangers via Anaheim and New York Rangers)	Omaha Lancers (USHL)
109	Dwight King (C/LW)	Canada	Los Angeles Kings (from Calgary)	Lethbridge Hurricanes (WHL)
110	Justin Falk (D)	Canada	Minnesota Wild	Spokane Chiefs (WHL)
111	Luca Caputi (LW)	Canada	Pittsburgh Penguins	Mississauga IceDogs (OHL)
112	Colton Sceviour (C/RW)	Canada	Dallas Stars	Portland Winterhawks (WHL)
113	Kent Patterson (G)	United States	Colorado Avalanche (from San Jose)	Cedar Rapids RoughRiders (USHL)
114	Ben Ryan (C)	United States	Nashville Predators	University of Notre Dame (CCHA)
115	Niclas Lucenius (C)	Finland	Atlanta Thrashers (from Atlanta via Vancouver)	Tappara (Finland)
116	Keith Aulie (D)	Canada	Calgary Flames (from Vancouver via Buffalo)	Brandon Wheat Kings (WHL)
117	Matt Halischuk (RW)	Canada	New Jersey Devils	Kitchener Rangers (OHL)
118	Alex Grant (D)	Canada	Pittsburgh Penguins (from Detroit)	Saint John Sea Dogs (QMJHL)
119	Mark Santorelli (C)	Canada	Nashville Predators (from Buffalo)	Chilliwack Bruins (WHL)
120	Ben Blood (D)	United States	Ottawa Senators	Shattuck-Saint Mary's (Midget Major AAA)
121	Mattias Modig (G)	Sweden	Anaheim Ducks	Lulea HF (Sweden)

=== Round five ===
#	Player	Nationality	NHL team	College/junior/club team
122	Mario Kempe (RW)	Sweden	Philadelphia Flyers	St. John's Fog Devils (QMJHL)
123	Maxim Goncharov (D)	Russia	Phoenix Coyotes	CSKA Moscow-2 (Russia)
124	Linden Rowat (G)	Canada	Los Angeles Kings	Regina Pats (WHL)
125	Brett Leffler (RW)	Canada	Washington Capitals	Regina Pats (WHL)
126	Joe Lavin (D)	United States	Chicago Blackhawks	US National Team Development Program (NAHL)
127	Milan Kytnar (C)	Slovakia	Edmonton Oilers	HC Topolcany (Slovakia)
128	Austin Smith (RW)	United States	Dallas Stars (from Columbus)	The Gunnery (USHS–CT)
129	Jamie Benn (LW)	Canada	Dallas Stars (from Boston via Columbus)	Victoria Grizzlies (BCHL)
130	Denis Reul (D)	Germany	Boston Bruins (from St. Louis)	Heilbronn (Germany)
131	John Lee (D)	United States	Florida Panthers	Moorhead (USHS–MN)
132	Chris Terry (LW)	Canada	Carolina Hurricanes	Plymouth Whalers (OHL)
133	Joe Stejskal (D)	United States	Montreal Canadiens	Grand Rapids (USHS–MN)
134	Juraj Mikus (D)	Slovakia	Toronto Maple Leafs	Dukla Trenčín (Slovakia)
135	Paul Carey (C)	United States	Colorado Avalanche	Salisbury (USHS–CT)
136	Ondrej Roman (C)	Czech Republic	Dallas Stars (from NY Islanders)	Spokane Chiefs (WHL)
137	Joshua Turnbull (C)	United States	Los Angeles Kings (from Tampa Bay)	Waterloo Black Hawks (USHL)
138	Max Campbell (C)	Canada	New York Rangers	Strathroy Rockets (WOHL)
139	Bradley Eidsness (G)	Canada	Buffalo Sabres (from Calgary)	Okotoks Oilers (AJHL)
140	Cody Almond (C)	Canada	Minnesota Wild	Kelowna Rockets (WHL)
141	Jake Muzzin (D)	Canada	Pittsburgh Penguins	Sault Ste. Marie Greyhounds (OHL)
142	Andrew Conboy (LW)	United States	Montreal Canadiens (from Dallas)	Omaha Lancers (USHL)
143	Mickey Renaud (C)	Canada	Calgary Flames (from San Jose via Colorado)	Windsor Spitfires (OHL)
144	Andreas Thuresson (F)	Sweden	Nashville Predators	Malmo Redhawks (Sweden)
145	Charles-Antoine Messier (C)	Canada	Vancouver Canucks (from Atlanta)	Baie-Comeau Drakkar (QMJHL)
146	Ilya Kablukov (F)	Russia	Vancouver Canucks	CSKA Moscow-2 (Russia)
147	Jean-Simon Allard (C)	Canada	Buffalo Sabres (from New Jersey via Calgary)	St. John's Fog Devils (QMJHL)
148	Randy Cameron (C)	Canada	Detroit Red Wings	Moncton Wildcats (QMJHL)
149	Michael Neal (LW)	Canada	Dallas Stars (from Buffalo via Columbus)	Belleville Bulls (OHL)
150	Matt Marshall (C/RW)	United States	Tampa Bay Lightning (from Ottawa)	Noble and Greenough School (USHS–MA)
151	Brett Morrison (C)	Canada	Anaheim Ducks	P.E.I. Rocket (QMJHL)

=== Round six ===
#	Player	Nationality	NHL team	College/junior/club team
152	Jon Kalinski (LW)	Canada	Philadelphia Flyers	Bonnyville Pontiacs (AJHL)
153	Scott Darling (G)	United States	Phoenix Coyotes	Capital District Selects (EJHL)
154	Dan Dunn (G)	Canada	Washington Capitals (from Los Angeles)	Wellington Dukes (OPJHL)
155	Jens Hellgren (RW)	Sweden	Colorado Avalanche (from Washington via Calgary)	Frolunda HC Jr. (Sweden)
156	Richard Greenop (C)	Canada	Chicago Blackhawks	Windsor Spitfires (OHL)
157	William Quist (F)	Sweden	Edmonton Oilers	Tingsryds AIF Jr. (Sweden)
158	Allen York (G)	Canada	Columbus Blue Jackets	Camrose Kodiaks (AJHL)
159	Alain Goulet (D)	Canada	Boston Bruins	Aurora Tigers (OPJHL)
160	Anthony Peluso (D)	Canada	St. Louis Blues	Erie Otters (OHL)
161	Patrick Maroon (LW)	United States	Philadelphia Flyers (from Florida)	St. Louis Bandits (NAHL)
162	Brett Bellemore (D)	Canada	Carolina Hurricanes	Plymouth Whalers (OHL)
163	Nichlas Torp (D)	Sweden	Montreal Canadiens	HV71 Jr. (Sweden)
164	Chris DiDomenico (C)	Canada	Toronto Maple Leafs	Saint John Sea Dogs (QJHML)
165	Patrik Zackrisson (F)	Sweden	San Jose Sharks (from Colorado)	Rogle BK (Sweden)
166	Blake Kessel (D)	United States	New York Islanders	Waterloo Black Hawks (USHL)
167	Johan Harju (LW)	Sweden	Tampa Bay Lightning	Lulea HF (Sweden)
168	Carl Hagelin (LW)	Sweden	New York Rangers	Sodertalje SK Jr. (Sweden)
169	Radim Ostrcil (D)	Czech Republic	Boston Bruins (from Calgary via Colorado)	VHK Vsetin (Czech Republic)
170	Harri Ilvonen (D)	Finland	Minnesota Wild	Tappara Jr. (Finland)
171	Dustin Jeffrey (C)	Canada	Pittsburgh Penguins	Sault Ste. Marie Greyhounds (OHL)
172	Luke Gazdic (LW)	Canada	Dallas Stars	Erie Otters (OHL)
173	Nick Bonino (C)	United States	San Jose Sharks	Avon Old Farms (USHS–CT)
174	Robert Dietrich (D)	Germany	Nashville Predators	DEG Metro Stars (DEL)
175	John Albert (C)	United States	Atlanta Thrashers	US National Team Development Program (NAHL)
176	Taylor Matson (C)	United States	Vancouver Canucks	Des Moines Buccaneers (USHL)
177	Vili Sopanen (F)	Finland	New Jersey Devils	Pelicans (Finland)
178	Zack Torquato (C)	Canada	Detroit Red Wings	Erie Otters (OHL)
179	Paul Byron (C)	Canada	Buffalo Sabres	Gatineau Olympiques (QJHML)
180	Justin Taylor (C)	Canada	Washington Capitals (from Ottawa)	London Knights (OHL)
181	Corey Syvret (D)	Canada	Florida Panthers (from Anaheim)	Guelph Storm (OHL)

=== Round seven ===
#	Player	Nationality	NHL team	College/junior/club team
182	Brad Phillips (G)	United States	Philadelphia Flyers	US National Team Development Program (NAHL)
183	Torrie Jung (G)	Canada	Tampa Bay Lightning (from Phoenix via Ottawa)	Kelowna Rockets (WHL)
184	Josh Kidd (D)	Canada	Los Angeles Kings	Erie Otters (OHL)
185	Nick Larson (C)	United States	Washington Capitals	Omaha Lancers (USHL)
186	C. J. Severyn (LW)	United States	Calgary Flames (from Chicago)	US National Team Development Program (NAHL)
187	Nick Eno (G)	United States	Buffalo Sabres (from Edmonton)	Green Mountain Glades (EJHL)
188	Matt Fillier (C/LW)	Canada	Los Angeles Kings (from Columbus)	St. John's Fog Devils (QJMHL)
189	Jordan Knackstedt (RW)	Canada	Boston Bruins	Moose Jaw Warriors (WHL)
190	Trevor Nill (C)	United States	St. Louis Blues	Detroit Compuware Ambassadors (MWEHL)
191	Ryan Watson (LW)	Canada	Florida Panthers	Cambridge Winterhawks (GOJHL)
192	Scott Kishel (D)	United States	Montreal Canadiens (from Carolina)	Virginia High School (USHS–MN)
193	David Skokan (C)	Slovakia	New York Rangers (from Montreal)	Rimouski Oceanic (QMJHL)
194	Carl Gunnarsson (D)	Sweden	Toronto Maple Leafs	Linkopings HC (SEL)
195	Johan Alcen (RW)	Sweden	Colorado Avalanche	Brynas IF Jr. (Sweden)
196	Simon Lacroix (D)	Canada	New York Islanders	Shawinigan Cataractes (QMJHL)
197	Michael Ward (D)	Canada	Tampa Bay Lightning	Lewiston Maineiacs (QMJHL)
198	Danny Hobbs (C/RW)	Canada	New York Rangers	Ohio Junior Blue Jackets (USHL)
199	Andrew Glass (LW)	United States	Washington Capitals (from Calgary)	Noble and Greenough School (USHS–MA)
200	Carson McMillan (RW)	Canada	Minnesota Wild	Calgary Hitmen (WHL)
201	Justin Braun (D)	United States	San Jose Sharks (from Pittsburgh)	University of Massachusetts Amherst (Hockey East)
202	Sergei Gaiduchenko (G)	Ukraine	Florida Panthers (from Dallas)	Lokomotiv Yaroslavl (Russia)
203	Frazer McLaren (LW)	Canada	San Jose Sharks	Portland Winterhawks (WHL)
204	Atte Engren (G)	Finland	Nashville Predators	Lukko (Finland)
205	Paul Postma (D)	Canada	Atlanta Thrashers	Swift Current Broncos (WHL)
206	Dan Gendur (RW)	Canada	Vancouver Canucks	Everett Silvertips (WHL)
207	Ryan Molle (D)	Canada	New Jersey Devils	Swift Current Broncos (WHL)
208	Bryan Rufenach (D)	Canada	Detroit Red Wings	Lindsay Muskies (OPJHL)
209	Drew MacKenzie (D)	United States	Buffalo Sabres	The Taft School (USHS–CT)
210	Justin Courtnall (LW)	Canada	Tampa Bay Lightning (from Ottawa)	Burnaby Express (BCHL)
211	Trent Vogelhuber (RW)	United States	Columbus Blue Jackets (from Anaheim)	St. Louis Bandits (NAHL)

== Draftees based on nationality ==
Rank	Country	Picks	Percent	Top selection
	North America	167	78.7%	
1	Canada	102	48.3%	Kyle Turris, 3rd
2	United States	65	30.4%	Patrick Kane, 1st
	Europe	45	21.3%	
3	Sweden	15	7.1%	Mikael Backlund, 24th
4	Russia	9	4.3%	Alexei Cherepanov, 17th
5	Czech Republic	5	2.4%	Jakub Voracek, 7th
6	Germany	4	1.9%	Timo Pielmeier, 83rd
6	Finland	4	1.9%	Niclas Lucenius, 115th
8	Slovakia	3	1.4%	Milan Kytnar, 127th
9	Switzerland	2	0.9%	Yannick Weber, 73rd
10	Denmark	1	0.5%	Lars Eller, 13th
10	Ukraine	1	0.5%	Sergei Gaiduchenko, 202nd

=== North American draftees by state/province ===
Rank	State/Province	Selections	Top selection
1	Ontario	36	Sam Gagner, 6th
2	Alberta	20	Thomas Hickey, 4th
3	Minnesota	16	Ryan McDonagh, 12th
4	British Columbia	14	Kyle Turris, 3rd
5	Michigan	13	Ian Cole, 18th
5	Quebec	13	Angelo Esposito, 20th
7	New York	6	Patrick Kane, 1st
8	Manitoba	5	Alex Plante, 15th
8	Saskatchewan	5	Garrett Klotz, 66th
10	Connecticut	4	Max Pacioretty, 22nd
10	Illinois	4	Bill Sweatt, 38th
10	Massachusetts	4	Joe Lavin, 126th
13	Pennsylvania	3	Eric Tangradi, 42nd
13	Ohio	3	Josh Unice, 86th
13	Wisconsin	3	Travis Erstad, 100th
13	Nova Scotia	3	Alex Grant, 118th
17	New Jersey	2	James van Riemsdyk, 2nd
17	Prince Edward Island	2	Logan MacMillan, 19th
17	California	2	Jonothon Blum, 23rd
17	New Brunswick	2	Brad Malone, 105th
21	Nebraska	1	Brett Bruneteau, 118th
21	Texas	1	Austin Smith, 128th
21	Missouri	1	Patrick Maroon, 161st
