= Karl Stewart =

Canadian ice hockey player (born 1983)

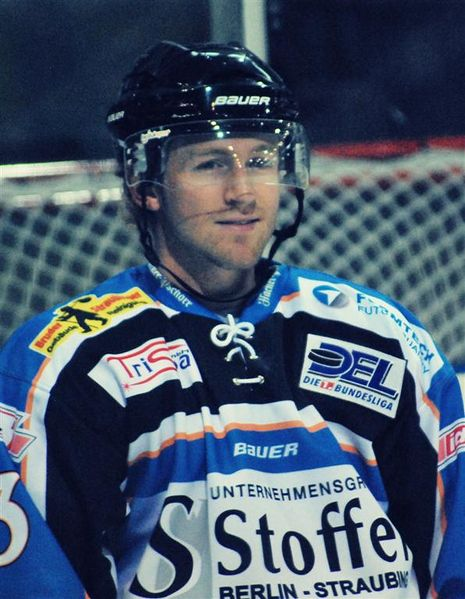
- Born: June 30, 1983 (age 43) Aurora, Ontario, Canada
- Height: 5 ft 11 in (180 cm)
- Weight: 185 lb (84 kg; 13 st 3 lb)
- Position: Centre
- Shot: Left
- Played for: Atlanta Thrashers; Pittsburgh Penguins; Chicago Blackhawks; Tampa Bay Lightning; Straubing Tigers
- NHL draft: Undrafted
- Playing career: 2003–2015

Karl Stewart (born June 30, 1983) is a Canadian former professional ice hockey player who played in the National Hockey League before finishing his career with the Straubing Tigers of the Deutsche Eishockey Liga (DEL).

== Playing career ==
Born in Aurora, Ontario, Stewart was not selected in the NHL entry draft. Stewart signed as a free agent with the Atlanta Thrashers on September 28, 2001. He played with the Plymouth Whalers of the Ontario Hockey League before making his pro debut with the Chicago Wolves in the American Hockey League, Stewart managed to play thirteen games for the Thrashers.

On August 17, 2006, he was traded by the Thrashers with a second round pick to the Anaheim Ducks for Vitaly Vishnevski but before even playing a game, he was claimed off waivers by the Pittsburgh Penguins on September 27, 2006.

After just three games he was claimed off waivers again, this time by the Chicago Blackhawks on October 26, 2006. Stewart managed to gain more ice time and also scored his first NHL goal. Along with this achievement, Stewart was also a fan favorite among the Chicago faithful, gaining respect with his energy and relentless bodychecking. Later in the season, he moved for a fourth time when he was traded by the Blackhawks to the Tampa Bay Lightning for Russian Nikita Alexeev on February 27, 2007.

Stewart spent the majority of the 2007–08 season in the AHL with the Norfolk Admirals, but managed to play nine games for the Lightning. He was signed by the Florida Panthers on October 2, 2008. Stewart spent the 2008–09 season with Panthers affiliate, the Rochester Americans of the AHL.

On April 6, 2009, Stewart signed with Deutsche Eishockey Liga club, Straubing Tigers.

After six seasons with the Tigers, Stewart left as a free agent to initially sign a one-year contract in the Austrian Hockey League with the Vienna Capitals. However two months later, Stewart terminated his contract with the Capitals and opted to end his playing career to take a scouting role within the NHL Central Scouting organization on July 30, 2015.

== Career statistics ==
			Regular season					Playoffs
Season	Team	League	GP	G	A	Pts	PIM	GP	G	A	Pts	PIM
2000–01	Plymouth Whalers	OHL	68	9	14	23	87	19	3	4	7	14
2001–02	Plymouth Whalers	OHL	65	20	23	43	104	6	0	2	2	21
2002–03	Plymouth Whalers	OHL	68	35	50	85	120	17	7	10	17	31
2003–04	Chicago Wolves	AHL	72	10	32	42	186	10	2	3	5	29
2003–04	Atlanta Thrashers	NHL	5	0	1	1	4	—	—	—	—	—
2004–05	Chicago Wolves	AHL	77	16	8	24	226	12	4	2	6	32
2005–06	Chicago Wolves	AHL	71	22	18	40	184	—	—	—	—	—
2005–06	Atlanta Thrashers	NHL	8	0	0	0	15	—	—	—	—	—
2006–07	Pittsburgh Penguins	NHL	3	0	0	0	2	—	—	—	—	—
2006–07	Chicago Blackhawks	NHL	37	2	3	5	43	—	—	—	—	—
2006–07	Tampa Bay Lightning	NHL	7	0	0	0	2	—	—	—	—	—
2007–08	Norfolk Admirals	AHL	62	14	13	27	96	—	—	—	—	—
2007–08	Tampa Bay Lightning	NHL	9	0	0	0	2	—	—	—	—	—
2008–09	Rochester Americans	AHL	72	20	8	28	70	—	—	—	—	—
2009–10	Straubing Tigers	DEL	40	12	14	26	30	—	—	—	—	—
2010–11	Straubing Tigers	DEL	51	16	21	37	133	—	—	—	—	—
2011–12	Straubing Tigers	DEL	47	13	23	36	92	5	2	1	3	4
2012–13	Straubing Tigers	DEL	52	16	18	34	56	7	1	1	2	2
2013–14	Straubing Tigers	DEL	45	18	14	32	78	—	—	—	—	—
2014–15	Straubing Tigers	DEL	41	6	10	16	61	—	—	—	—	—
NHL totals			69	2	4	6	68	—	—	—	—	—
