= Nick Ross (ice hockey) =

Canadian ice hockey player (born 1989)

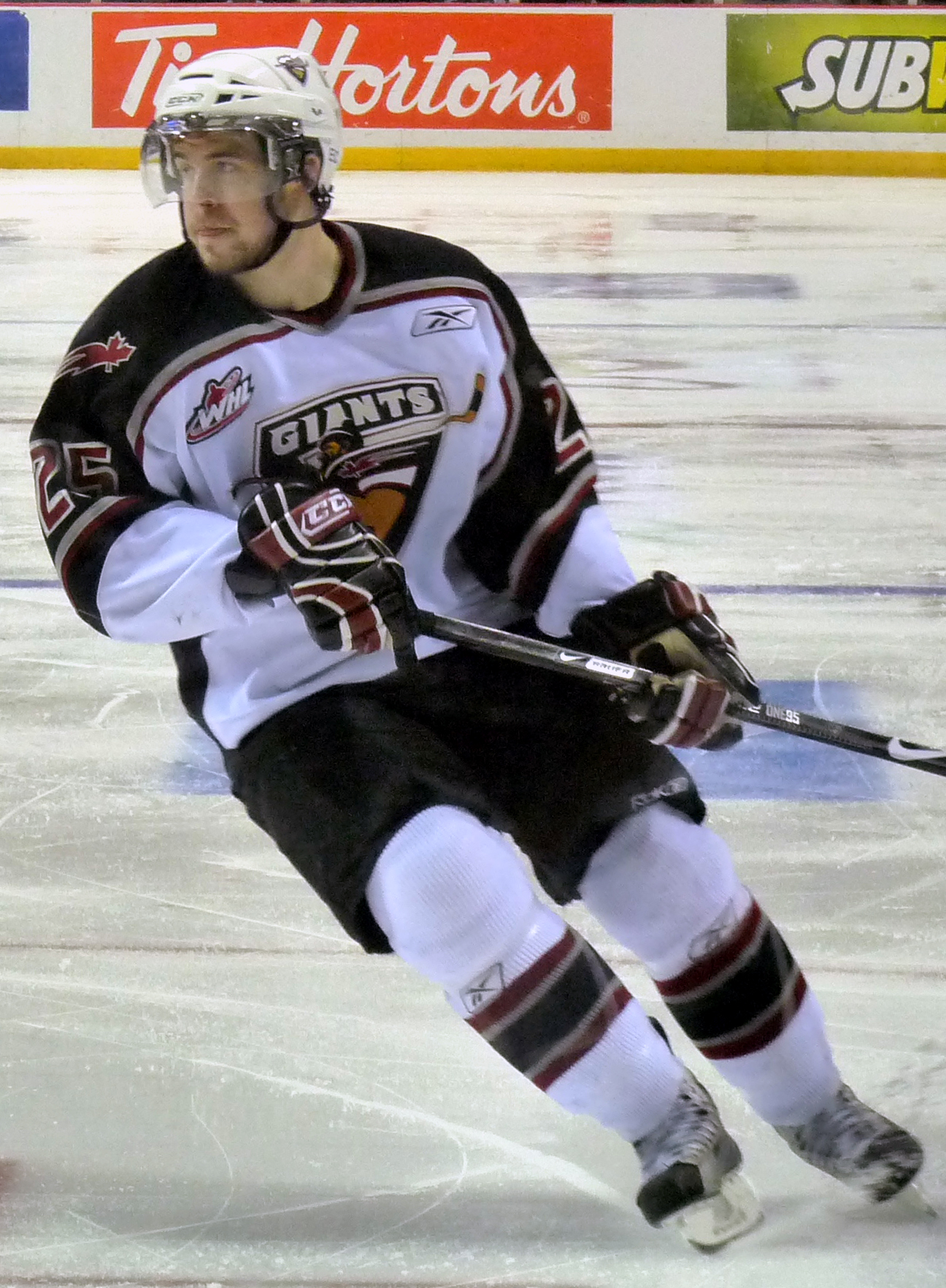
- Ross with the Vancouver Giants in 2009
- Born: February 10, 1989 (age 37) Edmonton, Alberta, Canada
- Height: 6 ft 1 in (185 cm)
- Weight: 188 lb (85 kg; 13 st 6 lb)
- Position: Defence
- Shoots: Left
- Ligue Magnus team Former teams: Ducs d'Angers; San Antonio Rampage; Portland Pirates; EC Red Bull Salzburg; Augsburger Panther; HDD Olimpija Ljubljana; HC Asiago; HC TWK Innsbruck; HKM Zvolen; DVTK Jegesmedvék; Lausitzer Füchse; Dornbirn Bulldogs; HK Dukla Michalovce
- NHL draft: 30th overall, 2007; Phoenix Coyotes
- Playing career: 2008–present

Nick Ross (born February 10, 1989) is a Canadian retired professional ice hockey defenceman who last played for Ducs d'Angers of the Ligue Magnus.

He was drafted by the Phoenix Coyotes with the 30th pick of the 2007 NHL entry draft.

== Playing career ==
Ross began his major junior career in the WHL with the Regina Pats in 2004–05, appearing in 10 games. After a 31-point campaign with the Pats in 2006–07, Ross was drafted 30th overall in the 2007 NHL entry draft by the Phoenix Coyotes. The next season, back in the WHL, he was traded from the Pats to the Kamloops Blazers on January 5, 2008, along with Spencer Fraipont and a fourth-round bantam draft pick, in exchange for Victor Bartley and Ryan Bender. Upon being eliminated from the 2008 WHL playoffs with the Blazers, the Coyotes assigned Ross to the San Antonio Rampage of the American Hockey League (AHL) for the remaining 4 games of the 2007–08 AHL season.

Returning to the Blazers the following season, in 2008–09, Ross was traded, along with Alex Rodgers, just before the January 10, 2009 trade deadline, to the Vancouver Giants in exchange for Curtis Kulchar and three bantam draft picks. He finished the season with an accumulated 43 points between the two teams. In the subsequent 2009 playoffs, after sweeping the Prince George Cougars, the Giants were pushed to a seventh game against the Spokane Chiefs in the second round where Ross scored the series-clinching goal in overtime – a point shot that deflected off a Chiefs defenceman.

On July 30, 2013, Ross returned for a second stint in the Austrian Hockey League, signing a one-year contract with HDD Olimpija Ljubljana. In the 2013–14 season, Ross enjoyed a more productive second tenure in the EBEL, posting 28 points in 39 games before opting to finish the season in the Italian Elite.A with HC Asiago.

On April 16, 2014, Ross signed to continue in the EBEL, joining his third club in as many seasons in agreeing to a one-year deal with HC TWK Innsbruck.

== Family ==
His younger brother, Brad Ross (born 1992), was selected by the Toronto Maple Leafs in the 2nd round (43rd overall) of the 2010 NHL entry draft, and is currently playing with the Iserlohn Roosters of the Deutsche Eishockey Liga (DEL).

== Career statistics ==
=== Regular season and playoffs ===
			Regular season					Playoffs
Season	Team	League	GP	G	A	Pts	PIM	GP	G	A	Pts	PIM
2004–05	Lethbridge Y Men AAA	AMHL	33	8	20	28	123	—	—	—	—	—
2004–05	Regina Pats	WHL	10	0	1	1	2	—	—	—	—	—
2005–06	Regina Pats	WHL	62	7	16	23	38	6	0	1	1	2
2006–07	Regina Pats	WHL	70	7	24	31	87	10	1	5	6	14
2007–08	Regina Pats	WHL	41	3	25	28	60	—	—	—	—	—
2007–08	Kamloops Blazers	WHL	31	5	14	19	55	4	0	2	2	10
2007–08	San Antonio Rampage	AHL	4	1	0	1	0	—	—	—	—	—
2008–09	Kamloops Blazers	WHL	40	4	18	22	51	—	—	—	—	—
2008–09	Vancouver Giants	WHL	34	7	14	21	32	17	1	8	9	14
2009–10	San Antonio Rampage	AHL	47	0	2	2	19	—	—	—	—	—
2009–10	Las Vegas Wranglers	ECHL	7	0	1	1	2	—	—	—	—	—
2010–11	San Antonio Rampage	AHL	29	0	6	6	16	—	—	—	—	—
2010–11	Las Vegas Wranglers	ECHL	21	2	9	11	8	—	—	—	—	—
2011–12	Portland Pirates	AHL	35	5	13	18	16	—	—	—	—	—
2012–13	EC Salzburg	AUT	9	1	3	4	9	—	—	—	—	—
2012–13	Augsburger Panther	DEL	24	2	7	9	16	1	0	0	0	25
2013–14	HDD Olimpija Ljubljana	AUT	39	8	20	28	89	—	—	—	—	—
2013–14	Asiago Hockey 1935	ITA	6	2	5	7	8	11	2	3	5	6
2014–15	HC Innsbruck	AUT	54	8	26	34	91	—	—	—	—	—
2015–16	HC Innsbruck	AUT	49	7	19	26	64	—	—	—	—	—
2016–17	HC Innsbruck	AUT	50	7	25	32	70	4	0	1	1	8
2017–18	HKM Zvolen	Slovak	56	9	30	39	52	3	0	0	0	0
2018–19	HC Innsbruck	AUT	52	9	31	40	44	—	—	—	—	—
2019–20	DVTK Jegesmedvék	Slovak	49	6	34	40	42	—	—	—	—	—
2020–21	Lausitzer Füchse	DEL2	44	8	29	37	96	—	—	—	—	—
2021–22	Dornbirn Bulldogs	ICEHL	39	0	19	19	16	—	—	—	—	—
2021–22	HK Dukla Michalovce	Slovak	14	2	9	11	10	6	1	3	4	2
AHL totals			115	6	21	27	51	—	—	—	—	—
AUT totals			253	40	124	164	367	4	0	1	1	8

=== International ===
Year	Team	Event	Result	GP	G	A	Pts	PIM
2006	Canada Pacific	U17	4th	6	3	5	8	14
2006	Canada	IH18	1st place, gold medalist(s)	4	1	0	1	0
Junior totals				10	4	5	9	14

Awards and achievements
Preceded by Kyle Turris	Phoenix Coyotes first-round draft pick 2007	Succeeded by Mikkel Boedker
