= 2005–06 NHL transactions =

Transactions by the National Hockey League

The following is a list of all team-to-team transactions that occurred in the National Hockey League during the 2005–06 NHL season. It lists, by date, the team each player has been traded to, signed by, or claimed by, and for which players or draft picks, if applicable.

== Trades ==
=== July ===
The 2005 NHL entry draft was held on July 30, 2005.

July 27, 2005	To Nashville Predators Darcy Hordichuk	To Florida Panthers 4th-round pick in 2005 (#104 - Matt Duffy)
July 27, 2005	To Mighty Ducks of Anaheim Todd Fedoruk	To Philadelphia Flyers 2nd-round pick in 2005 (PHX - #59 - Pier-Olivier Pelletier)^{1}
July 29, 2005	To Nashville Predators 3rd-round pick in 2005 (#78 - Teemu Laakso)	To Carolina Hurricanes Andrew Hutchinson
July 29, 2005	To Calgary Flames 3rd-round pick in 2005 (#69 - Gord Baldwin)	To Carolina Hurricanes Mike Commodore
July 30, 2005	To San Jose Sharks 1st-round pick in 2005 (#8 - Devin Setoguchi)	To Atlanta Thrashers 1st-round pick in 2005 (NYR - #12 - Marc Staal)^{1} 2nd-round pick in 2005 (#49 - Chad Denny); 7th-round pick in 2005 (#207 - Myles Stoesz)
July 30, 2005	To Atlanta Thrashers 1st-round pick in 2005 (#16 - Alex Bourret); 2nd-round pick in 2005 (#41 - Ondrej Pavelec)	To New York Rangers 1st-round pick in 2005 (#12 - Marc Staal)
July 30, 2005	To Florida Panthers 1st-round pick in 2005 (#20 - Kenndal McArdle)	To Philadelphia Flyers 1st-round pick in 2005 (#29 - Steve Downie); 2nd-round pick in 2006 (DET - #41 - Cory Emmerton)^{2}
July 30, 2005	To Colorado Avalanche 2nd-round pick in 2005 (#47 - Tom Fritsche); 2nd-round pick in 2005 (#52 - Chris Durand)	To Washington Capitals 1st-round pick in 2005 (#27 - Joe Finley)
July 30, 2005	To Montreal Canadiens 2nd-round pick in 2005 (#45 - Guillaume Latendresse)	To New York Rangers 2nd-round pick in 2005 (#56 - Marc-Andre Cliche); 3rd-round pick in 2005 (#66 - Brodie Dupont)
July 30, 2005	To Phoenix Coyotes 2nd-round pick in 2005 (#59 - Pier-Olivier Pelletier)	To Philadelphia Flyers 4th-round pick in 2005 (#119 - Jeremy Duchesne); 2nd-round pick in 2006 (#39 - Andreas Nodl)
July 30, 2005	To San Jose Sharks 6th-round pick in 2005 (#162 - P.J. Fenton); 4th-round pick in 2006 (NYI - #108 - Jase Weslosky)^{3}	To Tampa Bay Lightning 3rd-round pick in 2005 (#73 - Radek Smolenak)
July 30, 2005	To Buffalo Sabres 3rd-round pick in 2005 (#87 - Marc-Andre Gragnani); 4th-round pick in 2005 (#96 - Chris Butler)	To Calgary Flames 3rd-round pick in 2005 (#74 - Daniel Ryder)
July 30, 2005	To Tampa Bay Lightning 3rd-round pick in 2005 (#89 - Chris Lawrence); 4th-round pick in 2005 (#102 - Blair Jones)	To Philadelphia Flyers 2nd-round pick in 2006 (DET - #47 - Shawn Matthias)^{4}
July 30, 2005	To Minnesota Wild Todd White	To Ottawa Senators 4th-round pick in 2005 (#95 - Cody Bass)
July 30, 2005	To Columbus Blue Jackets 4th-round pick in 2005 (#101 - Jared Boll)	To Carolina Hurricanes Derrick Walser; 4th-round pick in 2006 (TOR - #99 - James Reimer)^{5}
July 30, 2005	To San Jose Sharks 6th-round pick in 2005 (#193 - Tony Lucia); 7th-round pick in 2006 (#202 - John McCarthy)	To Mighty Ducks of Anaheim 5th-round pick in 2005 (#141 - Brian Salcido)
July 30, 2005	To Dallas Stars 5th-round pick in 2006 (#138 - David McIntyre)	To Tampa Bay Lightning 6th-round pick in 2005 (#165 - Kevin Beech)
July 30, 2005	To Nashville Predators 4th-round pick in 2006 (#105 - Niko Snellman)	To Atlanta Thrashers Shane Hnidy
July 30, 2005	To Buffalo Sabres rights to Tim Kennedy	To Washington Capitals 6th-round pick in 2006 (#177 - Mathieu Perreault)
July 30, 2005	To Mighty Ducks of Anaheim Travis Moen	To Chicago Blackhawks Mikael Holmqvist
July 30, 2005	To Toronto Maple Leafs Jeff O'Neill	To Carolina Hurricanes conditional 4th-round pick in 2006^{6} (STL - #106 - Reto Berra)^{7}

1. Philadelphia's acquired second-round pick went to Phoenix as the result of a trade on July 30, 2005 that sent a fourth-round pick in the 2005 entry draft and a second-round pick in the 2006 entry draft to Philadelphia in exchange for this pick.
2. Atlanta's acquired first-round pick went to the Rangers as the result of a trade on July 30, 2005 that sent a first-round pick (#16 overall) and a second-round pick in the 2005 entry draft to Atlanta in exchange for this pick.
3. Arizona's acquired second-round pick went to Detroit as the result of a trade on June 24, 2006 that sent a first-round pick and a fifth-round pick in the 2006 entry draft to Phoenix in exchange for a second-round pick (#47 overall) in the 2006 entry draft and this pick.
  Arizona previously acquired this pick as the result of a trade on March 9, 2006 that sent Denis Gauthier to Philadelphia in exchange for Josh Gratton, a second-round pick (#47 overall) in the 2006 entry draft and this pick.
4. San Jose's acquired fourth-round pick went to the Islanders as the result of a trade on June 24, 2006 that sent a fourth-round pick (#98 overall) in the 2006 entry draft to San Jose in exchange for a sixth-round pick in the 2006 entry draft and this pick.
5. Arizona's acquired second-round pick went to Detroit as the result of a trade on June 24, 2006 that sent a first-round pick and a fifth-round pick in the 2006 entry draft to Phoenix in exchange for a second-round pick (#41 overall) in the 2006 entry draft and this pick.
  Arizona previously acquired this pick as the result of a trade on March 9, 2006 that sent Denis Gauthier to Philadelphia in exchange for Josh Gratton, a second-round pick (#41 overall) in the 2006 entry draft and this pick.
6. Chicago's acquired fourth-round pick went to Toronto as the result of a trade on June 24, 2006 that sent a third-round pick in the 2006 entry draft to Chicago in exchange for a fourth-round pick (#111 overall) in the 2006 entry draft and this pick.
  Chicago previously acquired this pick as the result of a trade on January 20, 2006 that sent Anton Babchuk and a fourth-round pick in the 2007 entry draft to Carolina in exchange for Danny Richmond and this pick.
7. The conditions of this pick are unknown.
8. Carolina's acquired fourth-round pick went to St. Louis as the result of a trade on January 30, 2006 that sent Doug Weight and the rights to Erkki Rajamaki to Carolina in exchange for Jesse Boulerice, Mike Zigomanis, the rights to Magnus Kahnberg, a first-round pick in the 2006 entry draft and fourth-round pick in the 2007 entry draft along with this pick.

=== August ===
August 1, 2005	To Boston Bruins Brad Isbister	To Edmonton Oilers 4th-round pick in 2006 (SJS - #98 - James Delory)^{1}
August 2, 2005	To Nashville Predators Danny Markov	To Philadelphia Flyers 3rd-round pick in 2006 (LAK - #86 - Bud Holloway)^{2}
August 2, 2005	To Edmonton Oilers Chris Pronger	To St. Louis Blues Eric Brewer; Jeff Woywitka; Doug Lynch
August 3, 2005	To Edmonton Oilers Michael Peca	To New York Islanders Mike York conditional pick in 2006^{3} (4th-round - COL - #110 - Kevin Montgomery)^{4}
August 3, 2005	To New York Islanders Brent Sopel	To Vancouver Canucks conditional 2nd-round pick in 2006^{5} (ANA - #38 - Bryce Swan)^{6}
August 4, 2005	To Los Angeles Kings Jeremy Roenick; 3rd-round pick in 2006 (#86 - Bud Holloway)	To Philadelphia Flyers future considerations
August 4, 2005	To Washington Capitals Chris Clark; 7th-round pick in 2007 (#199 - Andrew Glass)	To Calgary Flames 7th-round pick in 2006 (#187 - Devin DiDiomete); 6th-round pick in 2007 (COL - #155 - Jens Hellgren)^{7}
August 9, 2005	To Calgary Flames Philippe Sauve	To Colorado Avalanche future considerations
August 10, 2005	To Pittsburgh Penguins Jocelyn Thibault	To Chicago Blackhawks 4th-round pick in 2006 (#95 - Ben Shutron)
August 22, 2005	To Vancouver Canucks Steve McCarthy	To Chicago Blackhawks 3rd-round pick in 2007 (#86 - Josh Unice)
August 23, 2005	To Atlanta Thrashers Mark Popovic	To Mighty Ducks of Anaheim Kip Brennan
August 23, 2005	To Ottawa Senators Dany Heatley	To Atlanta Thrashers Marian Hossa; Greg de Vries
August 23, 2005	To New York Rangers Steve Rucchin	To Mighty Ducks of Anaheim Trevor Gillies conditional pick in 2007^{8} (WSH - 4th-round - #108 - Brent Bruneteau)^{9}
August 23, 2005	To Phoenix Coyotes Mike Leclerc	To Mighty Ducks of Anaheim conditional 4th-round pick in 2007^{10} (#93 - Steven Kampfer)
August 24, 2005	To Toronto Maple Leafs John Pohl	To St. Louis Blues future considerations
August 25, 2005	To Buffalo Sabres Toni Lydman	To Calgary Flames 3rd-round pick in 2006 (#87 - John Armstrong)
August 26, 2005	To Phoenix Coyotes Zbynek Michalek	To Minnesota Wild Erik Westrum; Dustin Wood
August 30, 2005	To Edmonton Oilers Yan Stastny	To Boston Bruins 4th-round pick in 2006 (SJS - #98 - James Delory)^{11}

1. The Islanders' acquired fourth-round pick went to San Jose as the result of a trade on June 24, 2006 that sent a fourth-round pick (#108 overall) and a sixth-round pick in the 2006 entry draft to the Islanders in exchange for this pick.
  The Islanders previously acquired this pick as the result of a trade on June 24, 2006 that sent a third-round pick in the 2006 entry draft to Boston in exchange for a fifth-round pick in the 2006 entry draft this pick.
  Boston re-acquired this pick as the result of a trade on August 30, 2005 that sent Yan Stastny to Edmonton in exchange for this pick.
2. Philadelphia's acquired third-round pick went to Los Angeles as the result of a trade on August 4, 2005 that sent future considerations to Philadelphia in exchange for Jeremy Roenick and this pick.
3. The conditions of this pick are unknown.
4. The Islanders' acquired fourth-round pick went to Colorado as the result of a trade on June 24, 2006 that sent a fifth-round pick and a sixth-round pick in the 2006 entry draft to the Islanders in exchange for this pick.
5. The conditions of this pick are unknown.
6. Vancouver's acquired second-round pick went to Anaheim as the result of a trade on March 9, 2006 that sent Juha Alen and Keith Carney to Vancouver in exchange for Brett Skinner and this pick.
7. Calgary's acquired sixth-round pick went to Colorado as the result of a trade on June 23, 2007 that sent a fifth-round pick in the 2007 entry draft to Calgary in exchange for a sixth-round pick (#169 overall) in the 2007 entry draft and this pick.
8. The conditions of this pick are unknown.
9. The Rangers' fourth-round pick went to Washington as the result of a trade on June 24, 2006 that sent a fifth-round pick in the 2006 entry draft to the Rangers in exchange for this pick.
  The Rangers re-acquired this pick as the result of a trade on January 8, 2009 that sent Maxim Kondratiev to Anaheim in exchange for Petr Sykora and this pick.
10. The conditions of this pick are unknown.
11. The Islanders' acquired fourth-round pick went to San Jose as the result of a trade on June 24, 2006 that sent a fourth-round pick (#108 overall) and a sixth-round pick in the 2006 entry draft to the Islanders in exchange for this pick.
  The Islanders previously acquired this pick as the result of a trade on June 24, 2006 that sent a third-round pick in the 2006 entry draft to Boston in exchange for a fifth-round pick in the 2006 entry draft this pick.

=== September ===
September 9, 2005	To Vancouver Canucks Craig Darby	To Tampa Bay Lightning future considerations
September 9, 2005	To Nashville Predators Kris Beech	To Pittsburgh Penguins conditional pick in 2006^{1} (FLA - 4th-round - #116 - Derrick LaPoint)^{2}
September 26, 2005	To Washington Capitals Jeff Friesen	To New Jersey Devils conditional pick in 2006^{3} (3rd-round - #67 - Kirill Tulupov)
September 30, 2005	To New York Rangers Marcel Hossa	To Montreal Canadiens Garth Murray

1. The conditions of this pick are unknown.
2. Pittsburgh's acquired fourth-round pick went to Florida as the result of a trade on June 24, 2006 that sent a fourth-round pick in the 2007 entry draft to Pittsburgh in exchange for this pick.
3. The conditions of this pick are unknown.

=== October ===
October 3, 2005	To Carolina Hurricanes Craig Adams	To Mighty Ducks of Anaheim Bruno St-Jacques
October 4, 2005	To Buffalo Sabres Michael Leighton	To Chicago Blackhawks Milan Bartovic
October 5, 2005	To Ottawa Senators Filip Novak	To Florida Panthers 2007 conditional draft pick^{1}
October 7, 2005	To Vancouver Canucks Jozef Balej future considerations	To New York Rangers Fedor Fedorov
October 8, 2005	To Columbus Blue Jackets Jason Chimera; Michael Rupp; Cale Hulse	To Phoenix Coyotes Geoff Sanderson; Tim Jackman
October 18, 2005	To New York Rangers Jeff Taffe	To Phoenix Coyotes Jamie Lundmark
October 23, 2005	To Nashville Predators Rick Berry	To Phoenix Coyotes future considerations

1. The conditions of this pick are unknown. No selections was made from this trade.

=== November ===
November 6, 2005	To Chicago Blackhawks Andy Hilbert	To Boston Bruins 5th-round pick in 2006 (NYI - #126 - Shane Sims)^{1}
November 6, 2005	To Dallas Stars Nathan Perrott	To Toronto Maple Leafs conditional pick in 2006^{2} (6th-round - #180 - Leo Komarov)
November 15, 2005	To Mighty Ducks of Anaheim Francois Beauchemin; Tyler Wright	To Columbus Blue Jackets Sergei Fedorov; 5th-round pick in 2006 (#142 - Maxime Frechette)
November 15, 2005	To Phoenix Coyotes Dave Scatchard	To Boston Bruins David Tanabe
November 19, 2005	To Florida Panthers Alexei Semenov	To Edmonton Oilers conditional pick in 2006^{3} (5th-round - #133 - Bryan Pitton)
November 25, 2005	To Phoenix Coyotes Pascal Rheaume; Ray Schultz; Steven Spencer	To New Jersey Devils Brad Ference
November 30, 2005	To San Jose Sharks Joe Thornton	To Boston Bruins Marco Sturm; Brad Stuart; Wayne Primeau

1. Boston's acquired fifth-round pick went to the Islanders as the result of a trade on June 24, 2006 that sent a third-round pick in the 2006 entry draft to Boston in exchange for a fourth-round pick in the 2006 entry draft and this pick.
2. The conditions of this pick are unknown.
3. The conditions of this pick are unknown.

=== December ===
December 2, 2005	To Calgary Flames Kristian Huselius	To Florida Panthers Steve Montador; Dustin Johner
December 2, 2005	To Vancouver Canucks Maxime Ouellet	To Washington Capitals 5th-round pick in 2006 (NYR - #137 - Tomas Zaborsky)^{1}
December 5, 2005	To Chicago Blackhawks Patrick Sharp; Eric Meloche	To Philadelphia Flyers Matt Ellison; 3rd-round pick in 2006 (MTL - #66 - Ryan White)^{2}
December 9, 2005	To Pittsburgh Penguins Eric Boguniecki	To St. Louis Blues Steve Poapst
December 12, 2005	To Dallas Stars Niklas Hagman	To Florida Panthers 7th-round pick in 2007 (#202 - Sergei Gayduchenko)
December 13, 2005	To Edmonton Oilers Blake Evans	To St. Louis Blues future considerations
December 28, 2005	To Carolina Hurricanes Stephen Peat	To Washington Capitals Colin Forbes
December 28, 2005	To Philadelphia Flyers Kiel McLeod	To Phoenix Coyotes Eric Chouinard
December 28, 2005	To Carolina Hurricanes Krys Kolanos	To Phoenix Coyotes Pavel Brendl
December 30, 2005	To Chicago Blackhawks Radim Vrbata	To Carolina Hurricanes future considerations

1. Washington's acquired fifth-round pick went to the Rangers as the result of a trade on June 24, 2006 that sent a fourth-round pick in the 2007 entry draft to Washington in exchange for this pick.
2. Philadelphia's acquired third-round pick went to Montreal as the result of a trade on June 24, 2006 that sent a third-round pick (#79 overall) and a fourth-round pick in the 2006 entry draft to Philadelphia in exchange for this pick.

=== January ===
January 6, 2006	To New York Rangers Petr Sykora; 4th-round pick in 2007 (WSH - #108 - Brett Bruneteau)^{1}	To Mighty Ducks of Anaheim Maxim Kondratiev
January 10, 2006	To New York Islanders John Erskine; 2nd-round pick in 2006 (#60 - Jesse Joensuu)	To Dallas Stars Janne Niinimaa; 5th-round pick in 2007 (#136 - Ondrej Roman)
January 18, 2006	To Pittsburgh Penguins Eric Cairns	To Florida Panthers 6th-round pick in 2006 (#155 - Peter Aston)
January 20, 2006	To Philadelphia Flyers Petr Nedved; Flyers option^{2} (4th-round pick in 2006 #101 - Joonas Lehtivuori)	To Phoenix Coyotes Dennis Seidenberg; Flyers option^{2} (4th-round pick in 2006; NYI - #115 - Tomas Marcinko)^{3}
January 20, 2006	To Carolina Hurricanes Anton Babchuk; 4th-round pick in 2007 (STL - #96 - Cade Fairchild)^{4}	To Chicago Blackhawks Danny Richmond; 4th-round pick in 2006 (TOR - #99 - James Reimer)^{5}
January 23, 2006	To Florida Panthers Jon Sim	To Philadelphia Flyers 6th-round pick in 2007 (#161 - Patrick Maroon)
January 24, 2006	To New York Rangers Martin Sonnenberg	To Phoenix Coyotes Jeff Taffe
January 26, 2006	To Edmonton Oilers Dick Tarnstrom	To Pittsburgh Penguins Jani Rita; Cory Cross
January 26, 2006	To Edmonton Oilers Jaroslav Spacek	To Chicago Blackhawks rights to Tony Salmelainen
January 29, 2006	To Nashville Predators Mike Sillinger	To St. Louis Blues Timofei Shishkanov
January 30, 2006	To Carolina Hurricanes Doug Weight rights to Erkki Rajamaki	To St. Louis Blues Jesse Boulerice; Mike Zigomanis rights to Magnus Kahnberg; 1st-round pick in 2006 (NJD - #30 - Matthew Corrente)^{6} 4th-round pick in 2006 (#106 - Reto Berra); 4th-round pick in 2007 (#96 - Cade Fairchild)

1. The Rangers' fourth-round pick went to Washington as the result of a trade on June 24, 2006 that sent a fifth-round pick in the 2006 entry draft to the Rangers in exchange for this pick.
2. The Flyers had an option to swap the fourth-round picks in the 2006 entry draft and third-round picks in the 2007 entry draft with Phoenix. The option was exercised for the 2006 draft but not for the 2007 draft.
3. Phoenix's acquired fourth-round pick went to the Islanders as the result of a trade on June 24, 2006 that sent a third-round pick in the 2006 entry draft to Phoenix in exchange for a fourth-round pick (#119 overall) in the 2006 entry draft and this pick.
4. Carolina's acquired fourth-round pick went to St. Louis as the result of a trade on January 30, 2006 that sent Doug Weight and the rights to Erkki Rajamaki to St. Louis in exchange for Jesse Boulerice, Mike Zigomanis, rights to Magnus Kahnberg, a first-round pick and a fourth-round pick in the 2006 entry draft along with this pick.
5. Chicago's acquired fourth-round pick went to Toronto as the result of a trade on June 24, 2006 that sent a third-round pick in the 2006 entry draft to Chicago in exchange for a fourth-round pick (#111 overall) in the 2006 entry draft and this pick.

=== February ===
February 1, 2006	To Calgary Flames Mike Leclerc; Brian Boucher	To Phoenix Coyotes Steven Reinprecht; Philippe Sauve
February 3, 2006	To Phoenix Coyotes Dwayne Zinger	To Washington Capitals Doug Doull
February 8, 2006	To Boston Bruins Brian Eklund	To Tampa Bay Lightning Zdenek Blatny
February 28, 2006	To Columbus Blue Jackets Cam Severson	To Calgary Flames Cale Hulse

=== March ===
March 1, 2006	To Atlanta Thrashers Joel Stepp	To Mighty Ducks of Anaheim Jani Hurme
March 8, 2006	To Edmonton Oilers Dwayne Roloson	To Minnesota Wild 1st-round pick in 2006 (LAK - #17 - Trevor Lewis)^{1} conditional 3rd-round pick in 2007 (ATL - #67 - Spencer Machacek)^{2}
March 8, 2006	To Dallas Stars Willie Mitchell; 2nd-round pick in 2007 (#50 - Nico Sacchetti)	To Minnesota Wild Shawn Belle; Martin Skoula
March 8, 2006	To Toronto Maple Leafs Luke Richardson	To Columbus Blue Jackets Columbus option 5th-round pick in 2006 (#136 - Nick Sucharski) or 4th-round pick in 2007
March 8, 2006	To San Jose Sharks Ville Nieminen	To New York Rangers 3rd-round pick in 2006 (ANA - #83 - John de Gray)^{3}
March 8, 2006	To Los Angeles Kings Mark Parrish; Brent Sopel	To New York Islanders Denis Grebeshkov; Jeff Tambellini conditional 3rd-round pick in 2006^{4}
March 8, 2006	To Colorado Avalanche Jose Theodore	To Montreal Canadiens David Aebischer
March 8, 2006	To Toronto Maple Leafs Aleksander Suglobov	To New Jersey Devils Ken Klee
March 9, 2006	To Atlanta Thrashers Steve McCarthy	To Vancouver Canucks conditional pick in 2007 (ATL - #115 - Niclas Lucenius)^{1}
March 9, 2006	To Philadelphia Flyers Niko Dimitrakos	To San Jose Sharks 3rd-round pick in 2006 (CBJ - #85 - Tom Sestito)^{2}
March 9, 2006	To Ottawa Senators Tyler Arnason	To Chicago Blackhawks Brandon Bochenski; 2nd-round pick in 2006 (#61 - Simon Danis-Pepin)
March 9, 2006	To Vancouver Canucks Mika Noronen	To Buffalo Sabres 2nd-round pick in 2006 (#46 - Jhonas Enroth)
March 9, 2006	To Phoenix Coyotes Jamie Rivers	To Detroit Red Wings 7th-round pick in 2006 (#191 - Nick Oslund)
March 9, 2006	To Detroit Red Wings Cory Cross	To Pittsburgh Penguins 4th-round pick in 2007 (#118 - Alex Grant)
March 9, 2006	To New York Rangers Sandis Ozolinsh	To Mighty Ducks of Anaheim 3rd-round pick in 2006 (#83 - John de Gray)
March 9, 2006	To Nashville Predators Brendan Witt	To Washington Capitals Kris Beech; 1st-round pick in 2006 (#23 - Semyon Varlamov)
March 9, 2006	To Carolina Hurricanes Mark Recchi	To Pittsburgh Penguins Niklas Nordgren; Krys Kolanos; 2nd-round pick in 2007 (PHI - #41 - Kevin Marshall)^{3}
March 9, 2006	To Florida Panthers Ric Jackman	To Pittsburgh Penguins Petr Taticek
March 9, 2006	To Edmonton Oilers Sergei Samsonov	To Boston Bruins Marty Reasoner; Yan Stastny; 2nd-round pick in 2006 (#50 - Milan Lucic)
March 9, 2006	To Vancouver Canucks Keith Carney; Juha Alen	To Mighty Ducks of Anaheim Brett Skinner; 2nd-round pick in 2006 (#38 - Bryce Swan)
March 9, 2006	To Mighty Ducks of Anaheim Jeff Friesen	To Washington Capitals 2nd-round pick in 2006 (#52 - Keith Seabrook)
March 9, 2006	To Phoenix Coyotes Joel Perrault	To Mighty Ducks of Anaheim Sean O'Donnell
March 9, 2006	To Phoenix Coyotes Yanick Lehoux	To Los Angeles Kings Tim Jackman
March 9, 2006	To Phoenix Coyotes Oleg Kvasha conditional 5th-round pick in 2006^{4} (#130 - Brett Bennett)	To New York Islanders 3rd-round pick in 2006 (BOS - #71 - Brad Marchand)^{5}
March 9, 2006	To New Jersey Devils Brad Lukowich	To New York Islanders 3rd-round pick in 2006 (PHX - #88 - Jonas Ahnelov)^{6}
March 9, 2006	To Philadelphia Flyers Denis Gauthier	To Phoenix Coyotes Josh Gratton; 2nd-round pick in 2006 (DET - #41 - Cory Emmerton)^{7} 2nd-round pick in 2006 (DET - #47 - Shawn Matthias)^{8}
March 9, 2006	To Calgary Flames Jamie Lundmark	To Phoenix Coyotes 4th-round pick in 2006 (NYI - #119 - Doug Rogers)^{9}
March 9, 2006	To New Jersey Devils Jason Wiemer	To Calgary Flames 4th-round pick in 2006 (#118 - Hugo Carpentier)
March 9, 2006	To Vancouver Canucks Sean Brown	To New Jersey Devils 4th-round pick in 2006 (#107 - T.J. Miller)
March 9, 2006	To Vancouver Canucks Eric Weinrich	To St. Louis Blues Tomas Mojzis; 3rd-round pick in 2006 (NJD - #77 - Vladimir Zharkov)^{10}
March 9, 2006	To Montreal Canadiens Todd Simpson	To Chicago Blackhawks 6th-round pick in 2006 (#169 - Chris Auger)
March 9, 2006	To Colorado Avalanche Jim Dowd	To Chicago Blackhawks 4th-round pick in 2006 (TOR - #111 - Korbinian Holzer)^{11}

1. Minnesota's acquired first-round pick went to Los Angeles as the result of a trade on June 24, 2006 that sent Pavol Demitra to Minnesota in exchange for a Patrick O'Sullivan and this pick.
2. Minnesota's acquired third-round pick went to Atlanta as the result of a trade on June 14, 2006 that sent Petteri Nummelin to Minnesota in exchange for a conditional third-round pick in the 2006 entry draft or 2007 entry draft (this pick). The conditions of this pick are unknown.
3. The Rangers' acquired third-round pick went to Anaheim as the result of a trade on March 9, 2006 that sent Sandis Ozolinsh to the Rangers in exchange for this pick.
4. The conditions of this pick was if Los Angeles made the 2006 Stanley Cup playoffs. Not exercised since Los Angeles missed the playoffs.
5. The condition for this pick was for a fourth-round pick unless Steve McCarthy re-signs with Atlanta. Then the pick becomes a third-round pick. Atlanta re-acquired this pick as the result of a trade on June 14, 2006 that sent Tommi Santala and a fifth-round pick in the 2007 entry draft to Vancouver in exchange for this pick.
6. San Jose's acquired third-round pick went to Columbus as the result of a trade on June 24, 2006 that sent a second-round pick in the 2006 entry draft to San Jose in exchange for a fourth-round pick in the 2006 entry draft, a second-round pick in the 2007 entry draft and this pick.
7. Washington's acquired second-round pick went to Philadelphia as the result of a trade on June 23, 2007 that sent a third-round pick in the 2007 entry draft and a second-round pick in the 2008 entry draft to Washington in exchange for this pick.
  Washington previously acquired this pick as the result of a trade on June 22, 2007 that sent a first-round pick in the 2007 entry draft to San Jose in exchange for a second-round pick in the 2008 entry draft and this pick.
  San Jose previously acquired this pick as the result of a trade on July 20, 2006 that sent Patrick Ehelechner and Nils Ekman to Pittsburgh in exchange for this pick.
8. The condition for this pick was if Oleg Kvasha did not re-sign with Phoenix, Phoenix would receive the New York Islanders 5th round pick in the 2006 NHL Draft. Kvasha did not re-sign with Phoenix.
9. The Islanders' acquired third-round pick went to Boston as the result of a trade on June 24, 2006 that sent a fourth-round pick and a fifth-round pick in the 2006 entry draft to the Islanders in exchange for this pick.
10. The Islanders' acquired third-round pick went to Phoenix as the result of a trade on June 24, 2006 that sent two fourth-round picks (#115 & #119 overall) in the 2006 entry draft to the Islanders in exchange for this pick.
11. Phoenix's acquired second-round pick went to Detroit as the result of a trade on June 24, 2006 that sent a first-round pick and a fifth-round pick in the 2006 entry draft to Phoenix in exchange for a second-round pick (#47 overall) in the 2006 entry draft and this pick.
12. Phoenix's acquired second-round pick went to Detroit as the result of a trade on June 24, 2006 that sent a first-round pick and a fifth-round pick in the 2006 entry draft to Phoenix in exchange for a second-round pick (#41 overall) in the 2006 entry draft and this pick.
13. Phoenix's acquired fourth-round pick went to the Islanders as the result of a trade on June 24, 2006 that sent a third-round pick in the 2006 entry draft to Phoenix in exchange for a fourth-round pick (#115 overall) in the 2006 entry draft and this pick.
  1. St. Louis' acquired third-round pick went to New Jersey as the result of a trade on June 24, 2006 that sent a first-round pick (#25 overall) in the 2006 entry draft to St. Louis in exchange for a first-round pick (#30 overall) in the 2006 entry draft this pick.
14. Chicago's acquired fourth-round pick went to Toronto as the result of a trade on June 24, 2006 that sent a third-round pick in the 2006 entry draft to Chicago in exchange for a fourth-round pick (#99 overall) in the 2006 entry draft and this pick.

=== June ===
The 2006 NHL entry draft was held on June 24, 2006.

June 1, 2006	To San Jose Sharks 6th-round pick in 2007 (#165 - Patrik Zackrisson)	To Colorado Avalanche rights to Michael Vernace
June 14, 2006	To Minnesota Wild rights to Petteri Nummelin	To Atlanta Thrashers conditional 3rd-round pick in 2006 or 2007 (2007 - #67 - Spencer Machacek)^{1}
June 14, 2006	To Vancouver Canucks Tommi Santala; 5th-round pick in 2007 (#145 - Charles-Antoine Messier)	To Atlanta Thrashers conditional 4th-round pick in 2007 (#115 - Niclas Lucenius)^{2}
June 14, 2006	To Dallas Stars rights to Mike Green	To New York Rangers future considerations
June 15, 2006	To Toronto Maple Leafs 7th-round pick in 2006 (PHX - #145 - Chris Frank)^{3}	To Boston Bruins rights to Petr Tenkrat
June 23, 2006	To Vancouver Canucks Lukas Krajicek; Roberto Luongo; 6th-round pick in 2006 (#163 - Sergei Shirokov)	To Florida Panthers Bryan Allen; Alex Auld; Todd Bertuzzi
June 24, 2006	To Montreal Canadiens 1st-round pick in 2006 (#20 - David Fischer); 2nd-round pick in 2006 (#53 - Mathieu Carle)	To San Jose Sharks 1st-round pick in 2006 (#16 - Ty Wishart)
June 24, 2006	To Los Angeles Kings Patrick O'Sullivan; 1st-round pick in 2006 (#17 - Trevor Lewis)	To Minnesota Wild Pavol Demitra
June 24, 2006	To New Jersey Devils 1st-round pick in 2006 (#30 - Matthew Corrente); 3rd-round pick in 2006 (#77 - Vladimir Zharkov)	To St. Louis Blues 1st-round pick in 2006 (#25 - Patrik Berglund)
June 24, 2006	To Phoenix Coyotes 1st-round pick in 2006 (#29 - Chris Summer); 5th-round pick in 2006 (#152 - Jordan Bendfeld)	To Detroit Red Wings 2nd-round pick in 2006 (#41 - Cory Emmerton); 2nd-round pick in 2006 (#47 - Shawn Matthias)
June 24, 2006	To San Jose Sharks 2nd-round pick in 2006 (#36 - Jamie McGinn)	To Columbus Blue Jackets 3rd-round pick in 2006 (#85 - Tommy Sestito); 4th-round pick in 2006 (#113 - Ben Wright); 2nd-round pick in 2007 (#53 - Will Weber)
June 24, 2006	To Calgary Flames Alex Tanguay	To Colorado Avalanche Jordan Leopold; 2nd-round pick in 2006 (#59 - Codey Burki) conditional pick in 2007^{1} (2nd-round - #49 - Trevor Cann)
June 24, 2006	To Montreal Canadiens 3rd-round pick in 2006 (#66 - Ryan White)	To Philadelphia Flyers 3rd-round pick in 2006 (#79 - Jonathan Matsumoto); 4th-round pick in 2006 (#109 - Jakub Kovar)
June 24, 2006	To Boston Bruins 3rd-round pick in 2006 (#71 - Brad Marchand)	To New York Islanders 4th-round pick in 2006 (SJS - #98 - James DeLory)^{2} 5th-round pick in 2006 (#126 - Shane Sims)
June 24, 2006	To Edmonton Oilers 3rd-round pick in 2006 (#75 - Theo Peckham)	To Atlanta Thrashers 3rd-round pick in 2006 (#80 - Michael Forney); 7th-round pick in 2006 (#200 - Arturs Kulda)
June 24, 2006	To Toronto Maple Leafs 4th-round pick in 2006 (#99 - James Reimer); 4th-round pick in 2006 (#111 - Korbinian Holzer)	To Chicago Blackhawks 3rd-round pick in 2006 (#76 - Tony Lagerstrom)
June 24, 2006	To Phoenix Coyotes 3rd-round pick in 2006 (#88 - Jonas Ahnelov)	To New York Islanders 4th-round pick in 2006 (#115 - Tomas Marcinko); 4th-round pick in 2006 (#119 - Doug Rogers)
June 24, 2006	To San Jose Sharks 4th-round pick in 2006 (#98 - James DeLory)	To New York Islanders 4th-round pick in 2006 (#108 - Jase Weslosky); 6th-round pick in 2006 (#173 - Stefan Ridderwall)
June 24, 2006	To Los Angeles Kings 4th-round pick in 2006 (#114 - Niclas Andersen); 5th-round pick in 2006 (#144 - Martin Nolet)	To New York Rangers 4th-round pick in 2006 (#104 - David Kveton)
June 24, 2006	To Colorado Avalanche 4th-round pick in 2006 (#110 - Kevin Montgomery)	To New York Islanders 5th-round pick in 2006 (#141 - Kim Johansson); 6th-round pick in 2006 (#171 - Brian Day)
June 24, 2006	To Florida Panthers 4th-round pick in 2006 (#116 - Derrick LaPoint)	To Pittsburgh Penguins 4th-round pick in 2007 (FLA - #101 - Matt Rust)^{3}
June 24, 2006	To Washington Capitals 4th-round pick in 2007 (#108 - Brett Bruneteau)	To New York Rangers 5th-round pick in 2006 (#137 - Tomas Zaborsky)
June 24, 2006	To Toronto Maple Leafs 6th-round pick in 2006 (#161 - Viktor Stalberg)	To Phoenix Coyotes 7th-round pick in 2006 (#188 - Chris Frank); 7th-round pick in 2006 (#196 - Benn Ferriero)
June 24, 2006	To Los Angeles Kings 7th-round pick in 2007 (#188 - Matt Fillier)	To Columbus Blue Jackets 7th-round pick in 2006 (#194 - Matt Marquardt)
June 24, 2006	To Dallas Stars Patrik Stefan; Jaroslav Modry	To Atlanta Thrashers Niko Kapanen; 7th-round pick in 2006 (#210 - Will O'Neill)
June 24, 2006	To Florida Panthers Craig Anderson	To Chicago Blackhawks 6th-round pick in 2008 (TBL - #160 - Luke Witkowski)^{4}
June 24, 2006	To Boston Bruins rights to Tuukka Rask	To Toronto Maple Leafs Andrew Raycroft
June 26, 2006	To Phoenix Coyotes Nick Boynton; 4th-round pick in 2007 (TOR - #99 - Matt Frattin)^{1}	To Boston Bruins Paul Mara; Boston option of a 3rd-round pick in 2007 (ANA - #63 - Maxime Macenauer)^{2} or 2008
June 30, 2006	To Tampa Bay Lightning Marc Denis	To Columbus Blue Jackets Fredrik Modin; Fredrik Norrena

1. Conditions if this draft pick are unknown.
2. Vancouver previously acquired this pick as the result of a trade on March 9, 2006 that sent Steve McCarthy to Atlanta in exchange for this pick. The condition for this pick was for a fourth-round pick unless Steve McCarthy re-signs with Atlanta. Then the pick becomes a third-round pick. Since the pick was returned to Atlanta, the pick stayed a fourth-round pick.
3. Toronto's acquired seventh-round pick went to Phoenix as the result of a trade on June 24, 2006 that sent a sixth-round pick in the 2006 entry draft to Toronto in exchange for a seventh-round pick (#196 overall) in the 2006 entry draft and this pick.
4. The conditions of this pick are unknown.
5. The Islanders' acquired fourth-round pick went to San Jose as the result of a trade on June 24, 2006 that sent a fourth-round pick and a sixth-round pick in the 2006 entry draft to the Islanders in exchange for this pick.
6. Florida re-acquired this pick as the result of a trade on February 27, 2007 that sent Joel Kwiatkowski to Pittsburgh in exchange for this pick.
7. Chicago's acquired sixth-round pick went to Tampa Bay as the result of a trade on February 27, 2007 that sent Nikita Alexeev to Chicago in exchange for Karl Stewart and this pick.
8. Phoenix's acquired fourth-round pick went to Toronto as the result of a trade on November 27, 2006 that sent Mikael Tellqvist to Phoenix in exchange for Tyson Nash and this pick.
9. Boston's acquired third-round pick went to Anaheim as the result of a trade on November 13, 2006 that sent Stanislav Chistov to Boston in exchange for Anaheim's option for a third-round pick in the 2007 entry draft (this pick) or 2008 and to swap fourth-round picks in the 2008 entry draft. The option to swap picks was relinquished in a subsequent trade.

== Waivers ==
Once an NHL player has played in a certain number of games or a set number of seasons has passed since the signing of his first NHL contract (see here), that player must be offered to all of the other NHL teams before he can be assigned to a minor league affiliate.

Date	Player	New team	Previous team
October 4, 2005	Chris Kunitz	Atlanta Thrashers	Mighty Ducks of Anaheim
October 18, 2005	Chris Kunitz	Mighty Ducks of Anaheim	Atlanta Thrashers
January 31, 2006	Rico Fata	Atlanta Thrashers	Pittsburgh Penguins
March 9, 2006	Rico Fata	Washington Capitals	Atlanta Thrashers
March 9, 2006	Mike Morrison	Ottawa Senators	Edmonton Oilers
March 9, 2006	Andy Hilbert	Pittsburgh Penguins	Chicago Blackhawks

== See also ==
- 2005 NHL entry draft
- 2005 in sports
- 2006 in sports
- 2006–07 NHL transactions
