= Korbinian Holzer =

German ice hockey player (born 1988)

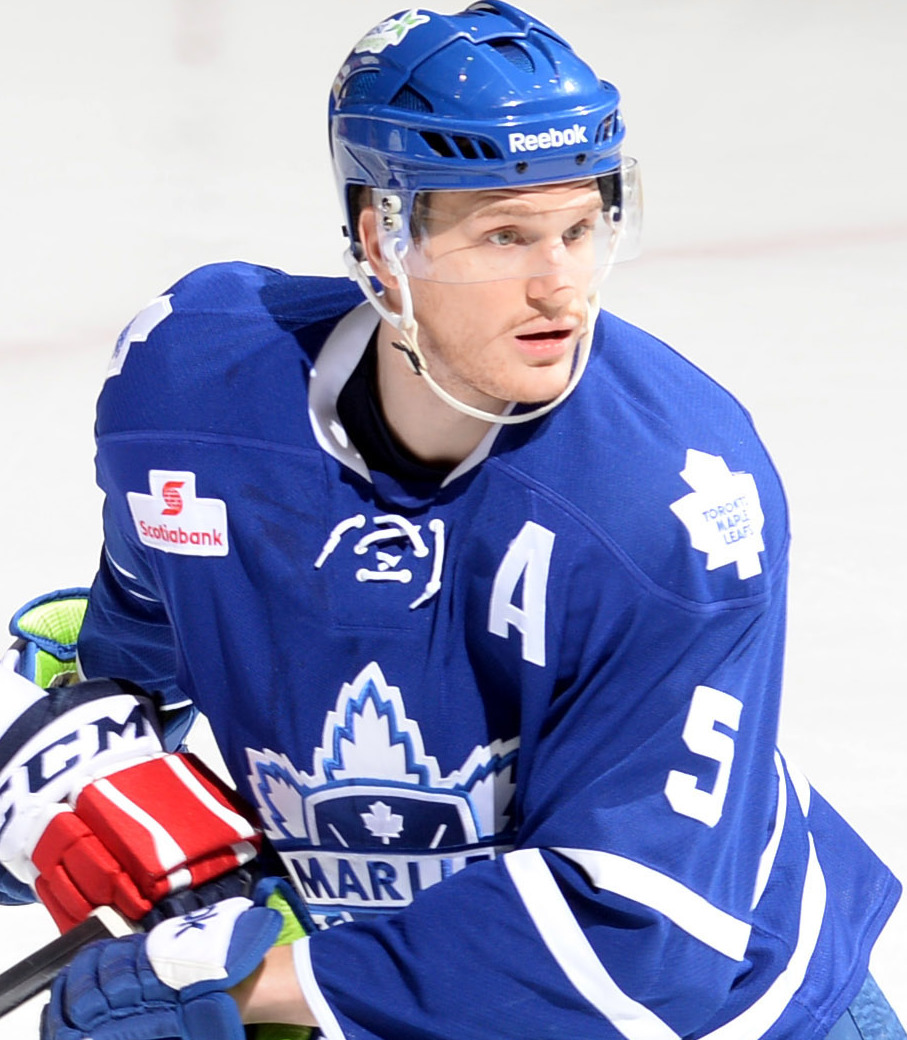
- Holzer with the Toronto Marlies in 2014
- Born: 16 February 1988 (age 38) Munich, West Germany
- Height: 6 ft 3 in (191 cm)
- Weight: 216 lb (98 kg; 15 st 6 lb)
- Position: Defence
- Shoots: Right
- DEL team Former teams: Adler Mannheim; DEG Metro Stars; Toronto Maple Leafs; Anaheim Ducks; Nashville Predators; Avtomobilist Yekaterinburg
- National team: Germany
- NHL draft: 111th overall, 2006; Toronto Maple Leafs
- Playing career: 2005–present

Korbinian Holzer (born 16 February 1988) is a German professional ice hockey defenceman currently playing for Adler Mannheim of the Deutsche Eishockey Liga (DEL). He previously played for the Anaheim Ducks, Nashville Predators, and Toronto Maple Leafs of the National Hockey League (NHL).

== Playing career ==
Holzer was drafted in the fourth round, 111th overall, of the 2006 NHL entry draft by the Toronto Maple Leafs. Drafted from playing in his native Germany with EC Bad Tölz, he made his debut in the top Deutsche Eishockey Liga (DEL) with the DEG Metro Stars.

Holzer began the 2010–11 season with the Maple Leafs' American Hockey League (AHL) affiliate, the Toronto Marlies. On 3 November 2010, he was recalled from the minors to make his NHL debut on 6 November 2010.

In the 2012–13 season, Holzer was recalled by the Maple Leafs on 5 February 2013 and scored his first NHL goal on just the fourth shot of his NHL career, his point slap shot beating Michal Neuvirth of the Washington Capitals. The Leafs ended up winning the game 3–2.

In the 2014–15 season, on 6 October 2014, the Maple Leafs waived Holzer. Unclaimed, he was later returned to the Toronto Marlies on 15 November. The Maple Leafs recalled Holzer on an emergency, only to send him back down to the Marlies on 16 November. One week later, Holzer was recalled and remained with the Leafs to replace injured defenceman Roman Polák. On 2 March 2015, Holzer was traded by the re-tooling Maple Leafs to the Anaheim Ducks in exchange for defenceman Eric Brewer and a fifth-round pick in the 2016 NHL entry draft (traded to Washington Capitals).

On 26 June 2017, Holzer continued his tenure with the Ducks by agreeing to a two-year contract extension.

On 20 June 2019, Holzer agreed to continue to return for his fifth season within the Ducks organization after he was re-signed to a one-year $850,000 contract extension. In the following 2019–20 season, Holzer remained on the Ducks roster, establishing a regular third-pairing role on blueline. In a career-high 46 games with the Ducks, Holzer added 1 goal and 4 points.

With the Ducks out of playoff contention at the NHL trade deadline, Holzer was traded by Anaheim to the Nashville Predators in exchange for Matt Irwin and a 2022 sixth-round draft pick on 24 February 2020. Holzer made three regular-season appearances with the Predators before the season was paused due to the COVID-19 pandemic. Returning to the club for the post-season, Holzer was a healthy scratch in their qualifying series defeat to the Arizona Coyotes.

On 1 November 2020, Holzer as a free agent, left the NHL and was belatedly signed to a one-year contract with Russian outfit, Avtomobilist Yekaterinburg of the Kontinental Hockey League (KHL). In the 2020–21 season, Holzer was limited to 25 regular season games on the blueline with Avtomobilist, contributing with 1 goal and 4 points. He made five playoff appearances, registering two assists, before leaving the KHL at the conclusion of his contract.

On 7 May 2021, Holzer returned to his native Germany as a free agent, securing a two-year contract with Adler Mannheim of the DEL.

== International play ==
Holzer has represented the Germany national team in the 2010 Winter Olympics and 2010 IIHF World Championship. He also represented Germany at the 2018 IIHF World Championship, 2019 IIHF World Championship, and the 2021 IIHF World Championship.

On 25 January 2022, Holzer was selected to play for Team Germany at the 2022 Winter Olympics.

== Career statistics ==
=== Regular season and playoffs ===
			Regular season					Playoffs
Season	Team	League	GP	G	A	Pts	PIM	GP	G	A	Pts	PIM
2004–05	Tölzer Löwen	DNL	34	7	11	18	66	5	0	2	2	2
2005–06	Tölzer Löwen	DNL	2	1	1	2	6	—	—	—	—	—
2005–06	Tölzer Löwen	GER.2	36	2	3	5	80	—	—	—	—	—
2006–07	Eisbären Regensburg	GER.2	42	2	6	8	68	4	0	0	0	2
2007–08	DEG Metro Stars	DEL	35	2	5	7	66	13	0	2	2	20
2008–09	DEG Metro Stars	DEL	38	4	5	9	89	16	0	1	1	18
2009–10	DEG Metro Stars	DEL	52	6	16	22	96	3	0	0	0	4
2010–11	Toronto Marlies	AHL	73	3	10	13	88	—	—	—	—	—
2010–11	Toronto Maple Leafs	NHL	2	0	0	0	2	—	—	—	—	—
2011–12	Toronto Marlies	AHL	67	1	19	20	68	17	1	4	5	39
2012–13	Toronto Marlies	AHL	46	1	10	11	46	8	0	1	1	24
2012–13	Toronto Maple Leafs	NHL	22	2	1	3	28	—	—	—	—	—
2013–14	Toronto Marlies	AHL	72	5	18	23	104	10	2	5	7	4
2014–15	Toronto Marlies	AHL	9	0	2	2	10	—	—	—	—	—
2014–15	Toronto Maple Leafs	NHL	34	0	6	6	25	—	—	—	—	—
2015–16	San Diego Gulls	AHL	9	0	3	3	0	—	—	—	—	—
2015–16	Anaheim Ducks	NHL	29	0	3	3	10	—	—	—	—	—
2016–17	Anaheim Ducks	NHL	32	2	5	7	23	5	0	0	0	18
2017–18	Anaheim Ducks	NHL	16	0	0	0	6	—	—	—	—	—
2017–18	San Diego Gulls	AHL	9	0	2	2	14	—	—	—	—	—
2018–19	San Diego Gulls	AHL	12	2	3	5	4	—	—	—	—	—
2018–19	Anaheim Ducks	NHL	22	1	3	4	8	—	—	—	—	—
2019–20	Anaheim Ducks	NHL	46	1	3	4	35	—	—	—	—	—
2019–20	Nashville Predators	NHL	3	0	0	0	2	—	—	—	—	—
2020–21	Avtomobilist Yekaterinburg	KHL	25	1	3	4	33	5	0	2	2	6
2021–22	Adler Mannheim	DEL	37	7	6	13	48	9	0	1	1	2
2022–23	Adler Mannheim	DEL	47	1	11	12	61	5	0	0	0	2
2023–24	Adler Mannheim	DEL	48	5	9	14	45	7	0	1	1	29
2024–25	Graz 99ers	ICEHL	39	6	6	12	65	—	—	—	—	—
2025–26	Graz 99ers	ICEHL	44	3	5	8	45	8	0	6	7	12
DEL totals			257	25	52	77	405	53	0	5	5	75
NHL totals			206	6	21	27	139	5	0	0	0	18

=== International ===
Year	Team	Event	Result	GP	G	A	Pts	PIM
2005	Germany	U17	10th	5	0	0	0	4
2005	Germany	WJC18	8th	6	2	1	3	4
2006	Germany	WJC18	8th	6	1	2	3	18
2007	Germany	WJC	9th	6	0	0	0	8
2008	Germany	WJC D1	11th	5	1	1	2	0
2010	Germany	OG	11th	4	0	0	0	2
2010	Germany	WC	4th	8	0	0	0	22
2011	Germany	WC	7th	7	0	1	1	10
2016	Germany	WC	7th	8	1	0	1	14
2016	Germany	OGQ	Q	3	0	0	0	2
2018	Germany	WC	11th	7	0	1	1	14
2019	Germany	WC	6th	8	1	0	1	16
2021	Germany	WC	4th	10	2	2	4	26
2022	Germany	OG	10th	4	1	0	1	0
2022	Germany	WC	7th	6	0	0	0	2
Junior totals				28	4	4	8	34
Senior totals				65	5	4	9	108

== Awards and honours ==
Award	Year
International
World Championship All-Star Team	2021
