= 2014–15 NHL suspensions and fines =

The following is a list of all suspensions and fines enforced in the National Hockey League (NHL) during the 2014–15 NHL season. It lists which players or coaches of what team have been punished for which offense and the amount of punishment they have received.

Based on each player's average annual salary, divided by number of days in the season (195) for non-repeat offenders and games (82) for repeat offenders, salary will be forfeited for the term of their suspension. Players' money forfeited due to suspension or fine goes to the Players' Emergency Assistance Fund, while money forfeited by coaches, staff or organizations as a whole go to the NHL Foundation.

== Suspensions ==
‡ - suspension covered at least one 2015 playoff game

| Date of Incident | Offender | Team(s) | Offense(s) | Date of Action | Length | Salary Forfeited^{1} |
|---|---|---|---|---|---|---|
| May 15, 2014 | Zenon Konopka | Buffalo Sabres | Violating the terms of the NHL/NHLPA Performance Enhancing Substances Program. | May 15, 2014 | 20 games^{2} | N/A |
| October 19, 2014 | Slava Voynov | Los Angeles Kings | Suspended indefinitely pending a formal investigation by the NHL of an arrest of charges of domestic violence. | October 20, 2014 | 76 games^{3} | N/A^{4} |
| October 26, 2014 | John Scott | San Jose Sharks | Leaving the bench to start an altercation with Tim Jackman. | October 27, 2014 | 2 games | $17,073.17 |
| October 27, 2014 | John Moore | New York Rangers | Illegal check to the head of Erik Haula. | October 29, 2014 | 5 games | $51,859.76 |
| October 30, 2014 | Alex Burrows | Vancouver Canucks | Illegal check to the head of Alexei Emelin. | October 31, 2014 | 3 games | $72,580.65 |
| October 31, 2014 | Jordan Nolan | Los Angeles Kings | Boarding Darren Helm. | November 2, 2014 | 2 games | $17,073.18 |
| October 31, 2014 | Anton Volchenkov | Nashville Predators | Illegal check to the head of Micheal Ferland. | November 2, 2014 | 4 games | $21,505.36 |
| November 1, 2014 | Andrew Ference | Edmonton Oilers | Illegal check to the head of Zack Kassian. | November 3, 2014 | 3 games | $118,902.45 |
| November 4, 2014 | Jack Johnson | Columbus Blue Jackets | Illegal check to the head of Jiri Tlusty. | November 5, 2014 | 3 games | $70,276.50 |
| November 6, 2014 | Carter Ashton | Toronto Maple Leafs | Violating the terms of the NHL/NHLPA Performance Enhancing Substances Program. | November 6, 2014 | 20 games^{5} | $169,185.00 |
| November 25, 2014 | Ryan Garbutt | Dallas Stars | Kneeing Taylor Hall. | November 27, 2014 | 2 games | $43,902.44 |
| November 26, 2014 | Adam Lowry | Winnipeg Jets | Boarding Patrick Kaleta. | November 27, 2014 | 1 game | $4,453.41 |
| December 2, 2014 | Robert Bortuzzo | Pittsburgh Penguins | Interfering with Jaromir Jagr. | December 3, 2014 | 2 games | $6,451.62 |
| December 7, 2014 | Evander Kane | Winnipeg Jets | Boarding Clayton Stoner. | December 8, 2014 | 2 games | $56,451.62 |
| December 9, 2014 | Marco Scandella | Minnesota Wild | Illegal check to the head of Brock Nelson. | December 10, 2014 | 2 games | $11,021.50 |
| December 9, 2014 | Ryan Garbutt | Dallas Stars | Slew-footing Dustin Byfuglien. | December 11, 2014 | 3 games | $65,853.66 |
| December 22, 2014 | John Scott | San Jose Sharks | Punching an unsuspecting Tim Jackman. | December 24, 2014 | 4 games | $34,146.36 |
| December 31, 2014 | Keith Aulie | Edmonton Oilers | Illegal check to the head of Matt Stajan. | January 1, 2015 | 2 games | $8,602.16 |
| January 13, 2015 | Ryan Suter | Minnesota Wild | Elbowing Steve Downie. | January 14, 2015 | 2 games | $81,058.72 |
| January 15, 2015 | Brad Marchand | Boston Bruins | Slew-footing Derick Brassard. | January 16, 2015 | 2 games | $48,387.10 |
| January 16, 2015 | Daniel Carcillo | Chicago Blackhawks | Cross-checking Mathieu Perreault. | January 19, 2015 | 6 games | $40,243.92 |
| January 20, 2015 | Zac Rinaldo | Philadelphia Flyers | Charging and boarding Kris Letang. | January 26, 2015 | 8 games | $73,170.72 |
| February 10, 2015 | Antoine Roussel | Dallas Stars | Cross-checking Adam McQuaid. | February 12, 2015 | 2 games | $21,505.38 |
| February 13, 2015 | Dmitri Kulikov | Florida Panthers | Clipping Tyler Seguin. | February 16, 2015 | 4 games | $93,189.96 |
| February 21, 2015 | Jared Cowen | Ottawa Senators | Interfering with Jussi Jokinen. | February 23, 2015 | 3 games | $113,414.64 |
| March 3, 2015 | Matt Martin | New York Islanders | Kneeing Trevor Daley. | March 4, 2015 | 1 game | $5,376.34 |
| March 12, 2015 | Joakim Nordstrom | Chicago Blackhawks | Boarding Oliver Ekman-Larsson. | March 13, 2015 | 2 games | $6,630.82 |
| March 16, 2015 | Nazem Kadri | Toronto Maple Leafs | Illegal check to the head of Matt Fraser. | March 18, 2015 | 4 games | $141,463.41 |
| March 24, 2015 | Jared Boll | Columbus Blue Jackets | Illegal check to the head of Patrick Maroon. | March 26, 2015 | 3 games | $27,419.34 |
| March 31, 2015 | Dustin Byfuglien | Winnipeg Jets | Cross-checking J. T. Miller. | April 2, 2015 | 4 games | $111,827.96 |
| April 27, 2015 | Niklas Kronwall | Detroit Red Wings | Charging Nikita Kucherov. | April 28, 2015 | 1 game‡ | N/A |
| Player totals: | | | | | 178 games‡ | $1,533,127.15 |

1. All figures are in US dollars
2. Suspension will be served at the beginning of any new contract. The suspension is accompanied by mandatory referral to the NHL/NHLPA Program for Substance Abuse and Behavioral Health.
3. Voynov had played in six games for the Kings before his suspension and was not reinstated before the end of the season. On May 30, 2016, the NHL ruled Voynov's suspension was still in effect and he was not eligible to play in the 2016 World Cup of Hockey. On April 9, 2019, the NHL lifted Voynov's indefinite suspension, instead suspended him for the entirety of the 2019–20 NHL season and playoffs, leaving Voynov eligible to return to play in the NHL (barring further incident) on July 1, 2020. After appeal by Voynov and the NHLPA, on May 23, 2019, NHL/NHLPA Neutral Discipline Arbitrator, Shyam Das, upheld the suspension, but credited Voynov with having already served 41 games of such suspension, thus making him eligible to return at the mid-point of the 2019-20 regular season.
4. Voynov was suspended with pay and did not forfeit any salary.
5. Suspension accompanied by mandatory referral to the NHL/NHLPA Program for Substance Abuse and Behavioral Health.

== Fines ==
Players can be fined up to 50% of one day's salary, up to a maximum of $10,000.00 for their first offense, and $15,000.00 for any subsequent offenses. Fines listed in italics indicate that was the maximum allowed fine.

| Date of Incident | Offender | Team | Offense | Date of Action | Amount^{1} |
|---|---|---|---|---|---|
| October 16, 2014 | Milan Lucic | Boston Bruins | Making an obscene gesture during the Bruins' game against the Montreal Canadiens. | October 17, 2014 | $5,000.00 |
| November 8, 2014 | Antoine Roussel | Dallas Stars | Punching an unsuspecting Justin Braun. | November 10, 2014 | $5,376.34 |
| November 28, 2014 | Alexei Emelin | Montreal Canadiens | Illegal check to the head of Brian Gionta. | November 29, 2014 | $11,021.51 |
| November 29, 2014 | Marco Scandella | Minnesota Wild | Illegal check to the head of T. J. Oshie. | December 1, 2014 | $2,755.38 |
| December 2, 2014 | Team | Los Angeles Kings | Violating the terms of defenseman Slava Voynov's suspension. | December 2, 2014 | $100,000.00 |
| December 6, 2014 | Anders Lee | New York Islanders | Elbowing Carl Gunnarsson. | December 9, 2014 | $2,286.29 |
| December 13, 2014 | James Neal | Nashville Predators | Diving/Embellishment. | December 17, 2014 | $2,000.00 |
| December 30, 2014 | Jannik Hansen | Vancouver Canucks | Illegal check to the head of Tommy Wingels. | December 31, 2014 | $5,000.00 |
| December 26, 2014 | Team | Philadelphia Flyers | Violating the terms of the CBA (travelling during a restricted period for team activity). | January 4, 2015 | Undisclosed |
| December 29, 2014 | Gustav Nyquist | Detroit Red Wings | Diving/Embellishment. | January 7, 2015 | $2,000.00 |
| January 4, 2015 | Vincent Trocheck | Florida Panthers | Diving/Embellishment. | January 7, 2015 | $2,000.00 |
| January 14, 2015 | Sami Vatanen | Anaheim Ducks | Elbowing David Booth. | January 15, 2015 | $3,393.82 |
| January 19, 2015 | Cal Clutterbuck | New York Islanders | Diving/Embellishment. | January 28, 2015 | $2,000.00 |
| January 29, 2015 | P. K. Subban | Montreal Canadiens | Diving/Embellishment. | February 4, 2015 | $2,000.00 |
| February 22, 2015 | Michal Neuvirth | Buffalo Sabres | Diving/Embellishment. | February 26, 2015 | $2,000.00 |
| February 26, 2015 | Logan Couture | San Jose Sharks | Slew-footing Brendan Smith. | February 27, 2015 | $5,000.00 |
| February 28, 2015 | Gabriel Landeskog | Colorado Avalanche | Throwing a punch at Mikko Koivu while both players were on their respective benches. | March 3, 2015 | $5,000.00 |
| February 28, 2015 | Cody McLeod | Colorado Avalanche | Entering game late with intention of starting an altercation. | March 3, 2015 | $3,091.40 |
| March 1, 2015 | Richard Panik | Toronto Maple Leafs | Diving/Embellishment. | March 5, 2015 | $2,000.00 |
| March 12, 2015 | P. K. Subban | Montreal Canadiens | Diving/Embellishment. | March 20, 2015 | $3,000.00 |
| March 21, 2015 | Craig Smith | Nashville Predators | High-sticking Jerry D'Amigo. | March 22, 2015 | $5,000.00 |
| March 19, 2015 | Tom Wilson | Washington Capitals | Diving/Embellishment. | March 27, 2015 | $2,000.00 |
| March 28, 2015 | Tanner Glass | New York Rangers | Butt-ending Adam McQuaid. | March 28, 2015 | $3,897.85 |
| April 3, 2015 | Scott Gomez | New Jersey Devils | Elbowing Alexei Emelin. | April 4, 2015 | $1,478.49 |
| March 30, 2015 | Andrew Shaw | Chicago Blackhawks | Diving/Embellishment. | April 10, 2015 | $2,000.00 |
| April 17, 2015 | Bob Hartley (head coach) | Calgary Flames | His responsibility for the incident that took place on ice during Game 2 of the Flames' first round series against the Vancouver Canucks. | April 18, 2015 | $50,000.00 |
| May 3, 2015 | Brandon Prust | Montreal Canadiens | Derogatory public comments directed toward Referee Brad Watson. | May 5, 2015 | $5,000.00 |
| Player totals: | | | | | $250,301.48+ |

1. All figures are in US dollars

== See also ==
- 2014 in sports
- 2015 in sports
- 2014 NHL entry draft
- 2014–15 NHL season
- 2014–15 NHL transactions
- 2014–15 NHL Three Star Awards
- 2013–14 NHL suspensions and fines
