= Eric Brewer (ice hockey) =

Canadian ice hockey player (born 1979)

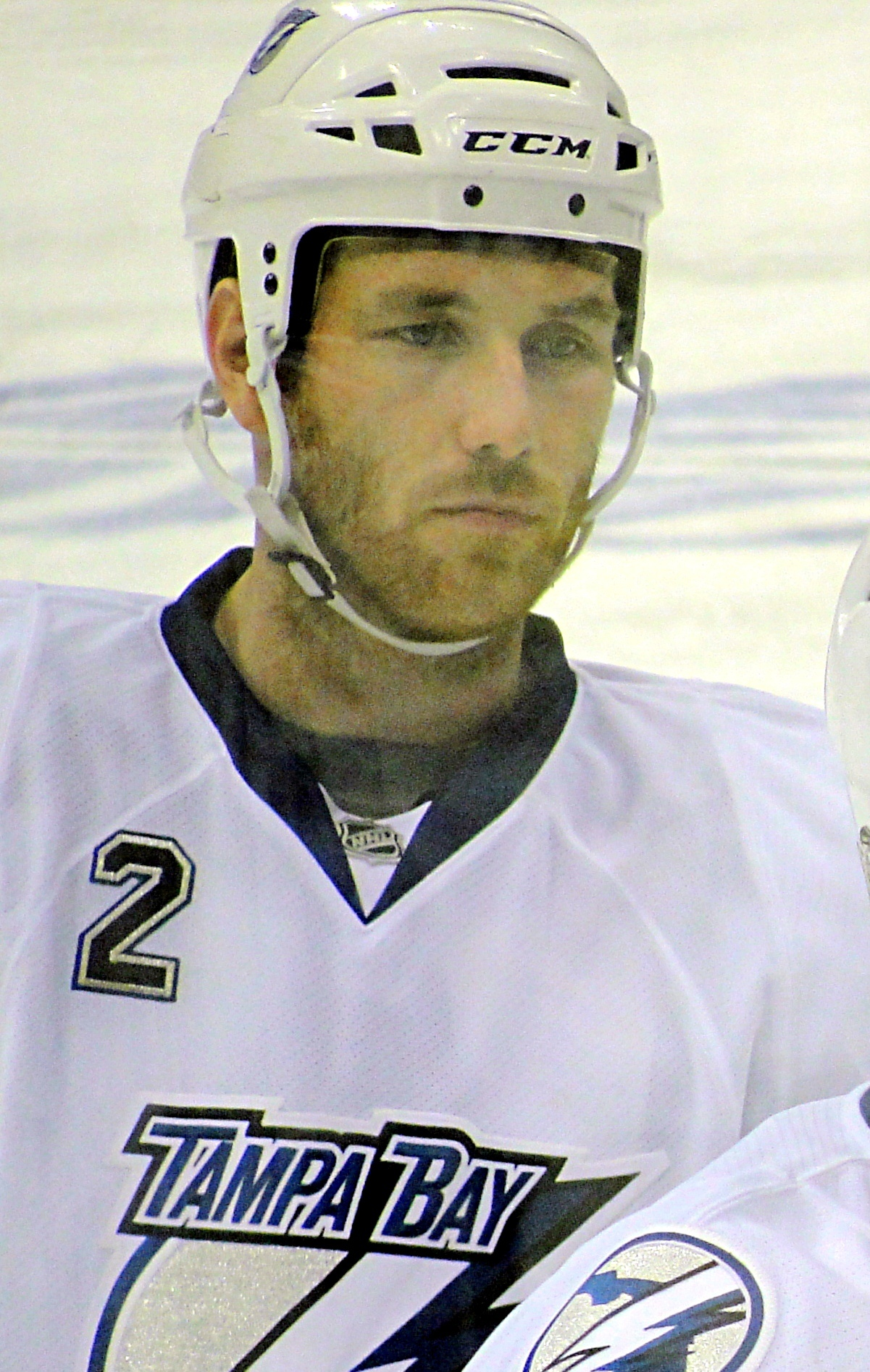
- Brewer with the Tampa Bay Lightning in April 2011
- Born: April 17, 1979 (age 47) Vernon, British Columbia, Canada
- Height: 6 ft 5 in (196 cm)
- Weight: 222 lb (101 kg; 15 st 12 lb)
- Position: Defence
- Shot: Left
- Played for: New York Islanders; Edmonton Oilers; St. Louis Blues; Tampa Bay Lightning; Anaheim Ducks; Toronto Maple Leafs
- National team: Canada
- NHL draft: 5th overall, 1997; New York Islanders
- Playing career: 1998–2015

Eric Peter Brewer (born April 17, 1979) is a Canadian former professional ice hockey player who was a defenceman for sixteen seasons in the National Hockey League (NHL) from 2000 to 2015. He is an NHL All-Star and Olympic gold medalist.

He began his career as a distinguished junior ice hockey player, named to the Western Hockey League (WHL) West Second All-Star Team and the Western Conference roster for the 1998 WHL All-Star Game (although he missed the game due to injury). Drafted in the first round, fifth overall by the New York Islanders in the 1997 NHL entry draft, Brewer has spent parts of his sixteen-year NHL career with the Islanders, the Edmonton Oilers, the St. Louis Blues, Tampa Bay Lightning, Anaheim Ducks and Toronto Maple Leafs, and captained the Blues for two years. He has also suited up for the Prince George Cougars of the WHL and the Lowell Lock Monsters of the American Hockey League (AHL). In 1999, Brewer was selected for the Prince George Cougars' all-time team in a Canadian Hockey League promotion.

Brewer has represented Canada at eight International Ice Hockey Federation-sanctioned events, winning three Ice Hockey World Championships gold medals and one World Cup of Hockey gold medal. He won his Olympic gold medal during the 2002 Winter Olympics. For this accomplishment, he was inducted into the BC Sports Hall of Fame with his British Columbian teammates in 2003.

Brewer has been a part owner of the Prince George Cougars, the team with which he played his junior hockey, since 2014. In 2022, Brewer was inducted into the BC Hockey Hall of Fame.

== Personal life ==
Brewer was born on April 17, 1979, in Vernon, British Columbia, to Anna and Frank Brewer. He was raised in Ashcroft, British Columbia, and began playing ice hockey in the Ashcroft Minor Hockey program. When he was fourteen, his family moved to Kamloops, British Columbia, where he attended junior and senior high school. Brewer excelled with the Kamloops Bantam AAA Jardine Blazers of the British Columbia Amateur Hockey Association (BCAHA). In 1995, Brewer was exposed to BCAHA Best Ever, a program designed to find and develop players and coaches for play in international competition. As a young hockey player, Brewer looked up to NHL stars Scott Niedermayer and Jeremy Roenick as role models.

In mid-2004, Brewer married Rebecca Flann, whom he met while playing junior hockey with the Prince George Cougars; they live in Vancouver, British Columbia. The Brewers have two daughters. Brewer's sister, Kristi, played for the University of British Columbia Thunderbirds women's ice hockey team.

Brewer is involved in numerous charitable organizations. During the 2004–05 NHL lockout, Brewer participated in several charity hockey games, playing in the four-game Ryan Smyth and Friends All-Star Charity Tour, the three-game Brad May and Friends Hockey Challenge, as well as the Our Game to Give charity hockey game held at Ivor Wynne Stadium in Hamilton, Ontario. During off-seasons, Brewer has participated in numerous charity golf tournaments, including the Burn Fund Golf Tournament in Prince George and the Recchi-Doan Charity Classic in Kamloops.

In 2014, Brewer became a part owner of the Prince George Cougars, joining a group of investors that includes fellow Cougars alumnus Dan Hamhuis. Each season, the Cougars award the Eric Brewer Award for Defenceman of the Year to the player voted the best defenceman on the team. In July 2022, Brewer was inducted into the BC Hockey Hall of Fame as part of the 2020 induction class, after the original induction ceremony was postponed due to COVID-19-related gathering restrictions.

== Playing career ==
=== Prince George Cougars ===
Brewer was drafted in the sixth round, 81st overall, by the Prince George Cougars in the 1994 WHL bantam draft. After being drafted, he played one final season with the Jardine Blazers, recording 38 points in only forty games. The following year, Brewer began his WHL career with the Cougars, playing 63 games in the 1995–96 season. Brewer finished his rookie WHL season with fourteen points, including four goals, and was named Cougars' Rookie of the Year.

In his sophomore season, Brewer became a leader on the Cougars' blue line. He was named to play for Team Orr in the 1997 CHL Top Prospects Game in February 1997 at Maple Leaf Gardens. He doubled his point total from the previous season, finishing with 29 points in 71 games played. Brewer followed his regular season by helping the Cougars go on a playoff run. After clinching the last spot in the West Division with a losing record, the Cougars defeated the number-one seed Portland Winter Hawks in the conference quarterfinals and the third-ranked Spokane Chiefs in the conference semifinals before finally losing to the second-ranked Seattle Thunderbirds in the Western Conference final. Brewer finished this run with six points in the Cougars' fifteen games.

Brewer's final season with Prince George was his best, statistically, in the WHL. After representing Canada at the 1998 World Junior Ice Hockey Championships, he was named to the Western Conference team for the WHL All-Star Game in Regina, Saskatchewan, which he missed, as well as much of the season, due to injury. However, Brewer finished the year with 33 points in only 34 games, a near one point-per-game average, and was named to the WHL West Second All-Star Team. Brewer was the highest ranked defenceman at sixth overall among North American skaters heading into the 1997 NHL entry draft. He was drafted fifth overall by the New York Islanders in June 1997.

=== New York Islanders ===
Just over a year after being drafted, Brewer signed his first professional contract with his draft team, the New York Islanders, in August 1998. Entering the NHL, Brewer was regarded as a future Norris Trophy candidate, and as a result, his contract was an entry level three-year, $2.775-million deal complemented by a $1-million signing bonus, the highest base salary available for a rookie. Brewer made his NHL debut on October 10, 1998, against the Pittsburgh Penguins, and on November 5, Brewer scored his first career goal against the Carolina Hurricanes' Trevor Kidd. Throughout his rookie season, Brewer was considered an integral part of the Islanders' defence, and, along with Zdeno Chára, Kenny Jönsson and Roberto Luongo, was considered untouchable by management at the 1999 NHL trade deadline. Brewer finished his rookie season with eleven points in 63 games.

After playing just three games of the 1999–2000 season, Brewer was assigned to the Islanders' AHL affiliate, the Lowell Lock Monsters. It was speculated that the reason behind this move was laziness by Brewer, who was benched during the final thirty minutes by head coach Butch Goring after losing a race for the puck against Mike Knuble in the Islanders' October 11, 1999, loss to the New York Rangers. Brewer also took a bad penalty earlier in the game, putting the Islanders down two men. After a two-week, five-game stint with the Lock Monsters, Brewer was subsequently recalled by the Islanders. After playing 26 games with the Islanders in which he only recorded two assists, Brewer was reassigned to the Lock Monsters on January 8, 2000, for the remainder of the season. Shortly after joining the Lock Monsters, Brewer suffered a sprained knee and missed the next two-and-a-half months of the season. Brewer went on to play 25 games for the Lock Monsters, recording two goals and two assists. He also participated in his first professional playoffs, as the Lock Monsters swept the Saint John Flames in three games in the first round, before being swept themselves in four games in the Eastern Conference semifinals by the Providence Bruins.

=== Edmonton Oilers ===
At the 2000 NHL entry draft, the Islanders traded Brewer, Josh Green and their second round selection (Brad Winchester) in the same draft to the Edmonton Oilers for Roman Hamrlík. Although surprised to be traded, Brewer was excited at the prospect of playing for the Oilers, who saw Brewer as a top-four defenceman. However, Brewer's Oiler career began on a sour note as he suffered a bruised left hip and tailbone in his first game with the team. Brewer missed the next four games before returning to the lineup. Brewer scored his first goal as an Oiler on November 7, 2000, against the New York Rangers. Brewer finished his first Oiler season with career highs in goals, assists and points, as well as the best plus/minus rating on the Oilers team, a plus-15. Further, Brewer gained his first NHL playoff experience, a quarterfinal series versus the Dallas Stars. Brewer had six points, but the Oilers were eliminated four games to two by the Stars.

The Oilers re-signed Brewer, who was a free agent, to a one-year, $907,500 contract in August 2001. In his second season with the Oilers, Brewer was assigned to play against the opposing teams' best offensive players by Oilers head coach Craig MacTavish. Brewer began to play more minutes in games, typically placing among the NHL leaders in average minutes played per game. With this enhanced role on the team, Brewer finished his season with new career highs in assists and points for the second consecutive season, and matched his career high in goals. Although his single year contract expired, his role on the Oilers had become more important and Brewer expected a large raise for his third season with the Oilers.

After a long holdout that lasted until the beginning of Oilers training camp, Brewer finally signed a two-year, $4-million contract in September 2002. At the half of the 2002–03 season, Brewer was named to play in his first NHL All-Star Game, dressing for the Western Conference in the fifty-third edition of the game. He finished with career highs for assists and points and set a career high for goals for the third consecutive season. He appeared in his second NHL playoffs, another quarterfinal series against the Dallas Stars in which the Oilers were once again eliminated four games to two. Brewer finished the playoffs with four points in the Oilers' six games.

In his fourth season with the Oilers, Brewer continued his role as a top defenceman. On November 22, 2003, Brewer was among the participants in the historic 2003 Heritage Classic ice hockey game versus the Montreal Canadiens at Commonwealth Stadium in Edmonton. Brewer scored the Oilers first goal of the game in a 4–3 loss in front of a then record crowd of 57,167. Later in the season, in a game on January 29, 2004, versus the Chicago Blackhawks, Brewer recorded his one-hundredth career point. Since his team depended on Brewer to play against the opposing teams' best offensive players, he finished the season with an average time on ice of 24:39, ranking fourteenth in the league. In the final year of his two-year contract, Brewer finished the season with his point totals matching those from his 2001–02 NHL season, a slight fall from his career highs set in his third season with the Oilers.

With the Oilers unwilling to pay what he was expecting, Brewer decided to go to salary arbitration to get a new contract. However, on August 4, 2004, Brewer signed a one-year, $2.65 million contract with the Oilers, avoiding his arbitration hearing set for only a few days later. Brewer was unable to play out his new contract due to the 2004–05 NHL lockout.

=== St. Louis Blues ===
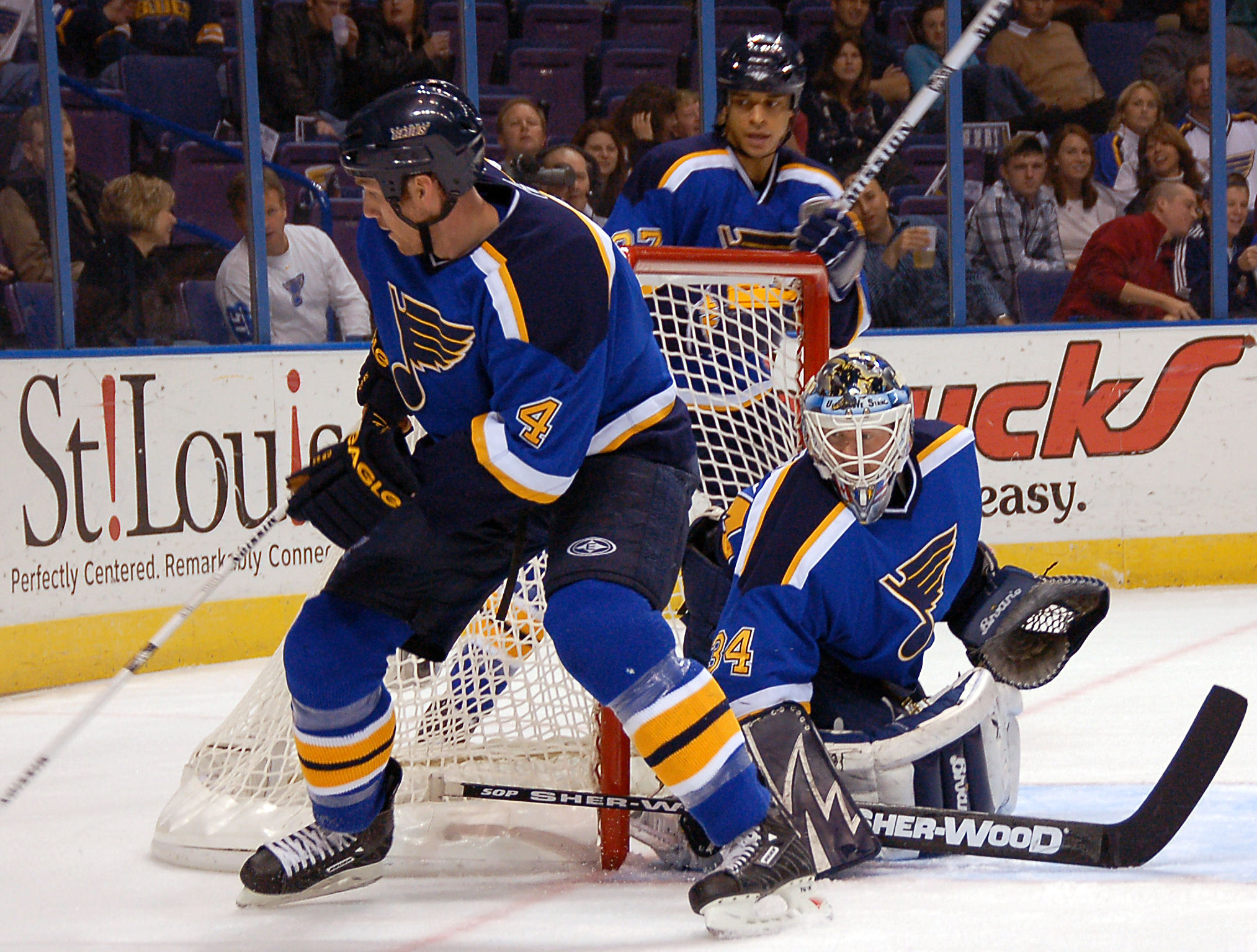
Brewer protecting the net in a game versus the San Jose Sharks in November 2005.

In August 2005, following the lockout, the Oilers traded Brewer, Jeff Woywitka and Doug Lynch to the St. Louis Blues in exchange for defenceman Chris Pronger. At the time of the trade, Brewer was a restricted free agent, so on August 15, 2005, Brewer accepted the Blues' qualifying offer, signing a one-year, $2-million contract. Brewer's first season with the Blues was a particularly poor one. After playing the first 18 games of the season, Brewer separated his shoulder on November 16, 2005, in a 2–0 victory over the Columbus Blue Jackets. Brewer missed ten games before being activated from the injured reserve list, returning to the St. Louis line-up for a game on December 17, 2005, against the Philadelphia Flyers. Less than a month later, in a game on January 13, 2006, against the Atlanta Thrashers, Brewer collided with the Thrashers' centre Karl Stewart, and dislocated his left shoulder, which ended his season. In just 32 games, Brewer finished his season with nine points, including six goals, two shy of his career best of eight set in the 2002–03 season. Despite his limited play, the Blues re-signed Brewer to a one-year, $2.014 million contract for the 2006–07 season.

Brewer's second season with the Blues began as a disappointment. By the first half of December 2006, Brewer had only amassed six points and a plus-minus rating of –11, often referred to as "the worst player on the ice" by both the media and Blues fans alike. Brewer was often involved in trade rumours, as he was set to become an unrestricted free agent following the completion of the season. Brewer believed his performance was the result of having only played in 32 NHL games since the 2003–04 season. However, after the firing of head coach Mike Kitchen on December 11, 2006, Brewer began playing much better under new head coach, Andy Murray. Over the next nineteen games, Brewer changed his –11 into a +2 and became an integral part of the Blues' defence. His turnaround was rewarded on February 24, 2007, when, rather than being traded as was previously rumoured, Brewer signed a four-year, $17-million contract extension with the Blues. Brewer continued his turnaround through the end of the season, finishing the year with six goals and 23 assists for 29 points, tying his career high for points set in the 2002–03 season and setting a new career high for assists.

In his third season with the Blues, Brewer continued to do well under Andy Murray. Brewer evolved into one of the top two-way defencemen in the NHL, with comparisons being made between him and former first overall draft pick Chris Phillips of the Ottawa Senators. His play and leadership abilities were recognized, when on February 8, 2008, Brewer was named as the nineteenth captain in the history of the St. Louis Blues, filling the vacancy created when former Blues captain Dallas Drake had his contract bought out following the 2006–07 season. On February 17, 2008, in a game against the Columbus Blue Jackets, Brewer set a career high for points in a game with four, all assists, eclipsing his previous career high of three points set on January 16, 2007. Brewer finished the season with only one goal in his 77 games played, his lowest goal total since the 1999–2000 season, although he added 21 assists, three short of a career high. At the completion of the season, Brewer underwent reconstructive surgery on his right shoulder to repair damage suffered in a fight in the Blues' season opening game against the Phoenix Coyotes on October 4, 2007.

Despite Brewer's end-of-season shoulder surgery, he was able to join the Blues for his fourth season with the team in time for their season-opening game against the Nashville Predators, where he led the Blues with 24:43 of ice time in a 5–2 victory. Eight days later, Brewer played in his 600th career NHL game, a 4–3 shootout victory against the Chicago Blackhawks. Prior to the Christmas break, Brewer underwent season-ending back surgery. The surgery ended Brewer's season after only 28 games played and six points, his lowest games played and point totals since his sophomore season with the New York Islanders. Brewer subsequently underwent two more surgeries that off-season, including a second back surgery in April and a knee surgery in August.

Unlike the previous season, Brewer's off-season surgeries delayed the start of his fifth season with the Blues until the team's eleventh game of the season, a 2–0 loss to the Arizona Coyotes. Brewer had missed the Blues' previous 64 games prior to his return against the Coyotes, which was earlier than expected after rehabbing from his back surgeries that had been considered career threatening. Brewer's health largely remained stable throughout the season as he finished the year with 15 points in 59 games played, including tying his career-high in goals with eight.

Healthy to begin his sixth season with the Blues, Brewer recorded his 200th career point on December 15, 2010 against the Detroit Red Wings, assisting on a goal by Carlo Colaiacovo. Brewer remained healthy well into the season, only missing one game in February due to his wife being in labour. However, as the 2011 NHL trade deadline approached, Brewer's name was mentioned in trade rumours.

=== Tampa Bay Lightning ===
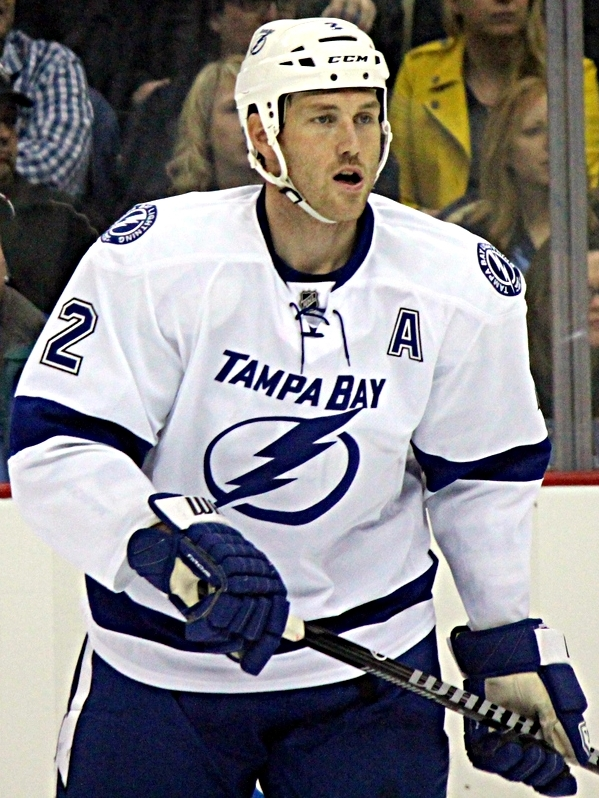
Brewer with the Lightning in March 2014.

On February 18, 2011, Brewer was traded to the Tampa Bay Lightning for Brock Beukeboom and Tampa Bay's third-round pick in the 2011 NHL entry draft (Jordan Binnington). In 22 games with Tampa Bay, he scored one goal and one assist. He also led the Lightning in average ice time per game, with 21:34. At the end of the 2010–11 season, Brewer recorded a career-high nine goals and also amassed 81 penalty minutes, good for the second-highest total of his NHL career. He also appeared in a career-high 18 post-season games with the Lightning in the 2011 playoffs, registering one goal and seven points, helping the Lightning in their first playoff appearance in four seasons. He set a career-high with three points in game 2 of the Eastern Conference Quarter-finals against the Pittsburgh Penguins and finished the playoffs ranked third among all skaters with 51 blocked shots. On June 24, 2011, Brewer signed a four-year, $15.4 million contract extension with the Lightning.

The 2011–12 season was Brewer's first full season with the Lightning and first under his four-year contract extension. Throughout the season, Brewer was relied upon heavily by the Lightning, leading the team in average ice time per game with 23:16. He finished the season having played in all 82 games, his first season without missing a single game since the 2006–07 season. He also set career highs with 176 shots blocked and 197 hits.

With the NHL Collective Bargaining Agreement set to expire on September 15, 2012, the 2012–13 NHL lockout resulted in the postponement of the 2012–13 season until January 2013. Brewer did not play in Europe during the lockout, instead supporting the National Hockey League Players' Association (NHLPA) by participating in negotiations between the NHL and NHLPA. Upon the end of the lockout, Brewer started the season with a two-goal performance in the Lightning's season opening 6–3 victory against the Washington Capitals. Brewer finished the lockout-shortened season with twelve points while playing in all 48 games.

Entering his fifteenth NHL season, Brewer continued his tenure with the Lightning with two years remaining on his contract. After Martin St. Louis was traded at the 2014 NHL trade deadline and Steven Stamkos replaced him as team captain, Brewer was named as an alternate captain for the rest of the 2013–14 NHL season. Having gone most of the season without a goal, Brewer scored his first of the season on March 20, 2014 in a 5–4 victory against the Ottawa Senators. In the Lightning's final home game of the regular season, Brewer scored two goals to help secure a 3–2 victory against the Columbus Blue Jackets in goaltender Kristers Gudļevskis's NHL debut. Brewer finished the regular season with seventeen points in 77 games played. Brewer appeared in all four games for the Lightning during the 2014 Stanley Cup playoffs as the team was swept in their first round series against the Montreal Canadiens.

=== Anaheim Ducks ===
On November 28, 2014, while in the final year of his contract with the Lightning, Brewer was traded to the Anaheim Ducks in exchange for a third-round pick in the 2015 NHL entry draft. At the time, Brewer had appeared in 17 games with the Lightning during the 2014–15 season and had four assists on the year. He finished his career with the Lightning having played in 246 games and scored ten goals and 46 assists. The next night, Brewer played in his first game with the Ducks, recording 15:07 in ice time in a 6–4 loss to the San Jose Sharks. On December 3, 2014, after playing in only two games for the Ducks, the team announced that Brewer was expected to miss four-to-six weeks after breaking a bone in his foot from a blocked shot. Brewer returned to the Ducks lineup two months later on February 3, 2015 against the Carolina Hurricanes and scored his first goal for Anaheim on February 8, 2015 against his former teammates in a 5–3 loss to the Tampa Bay Lightning.

=== Toronto Maple Leafs ===
On March 2, 2015, the 2015 NHL trade deadline, the Ducks traded Brewer and a fifth-round pick in the 2016 NHL entry draft to the Toronto Maple Leafs in exchange for defenceman Korbinian Holzer, ending a brief nine game career with the Anaheim Ducks. Brewer's first game as a member of the Maple Leafs came on March 5, 2015 against the Tampa Bay Lighting. On March 21, 2015, Brewer became the 300th NHL player to play in 1,000 career games in a 5–3 loss to the Ottawa Senators. Two days later, the Maple Leafs honored Brewer's achievement with a ceremony prior to their game against the Minnesota Wild, at which they presented him with a silver stick, and Rolex watch, and a $10,000 charitable donation in his name. He scored his first goal with the club two games later, the game-winning overtime goal in a 4–3 victory over the Ottawa Senators on March 28, 2015. After missing the playoffs with the Maple Leafs, Brewer finished the 2014–15 season with two goals and three assists in eighteen games with the Maple Leafs. Through his entire 2014–15 NHL season with the Lightning, Ducks, and Maple Leafs, Brewer scored three goals and eight assists in 44 games played, the fewest games played of his career since his injury-plagued 2008–09 season with the St. Louis Blues.

Ahead of the 2015–16 NHL season, Brewer was not re-signed by the Maple Leafs and became an unrestricted free agent on July 1, 2015. He spent the summer training in hopes of signing an NHL contract, but realized by mid-August that he was unlikely to find a team interested in his services, and chose not to extend his career by playing in Europe.

== International play ==
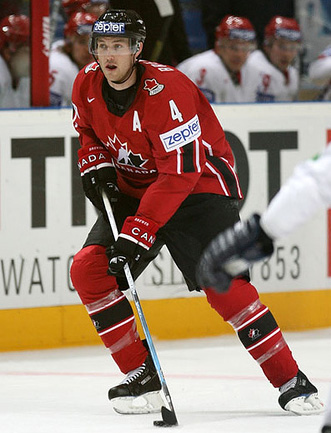
- Brewer with Team Canada in 2007

Medal record

Men's ice hockey

Representing Canada

Olympic Games
Gold medal – first place	2002 Salt Lake City	

World Championships
Gold medal – first place	2003 Helsinki	
Gold medal – first place	2004 Prague	
Gold medal – first place	2007 Moscow	

World Cup
Gold medal – first place	2004 Toronto	

Throughout his career, Brewer has represented Canada at various international ice hockey tournaments. He first competed internationally as a member of Team Pacific Canada at the 1995 World U-17 Hockey Challenge in Moncton, New Brunswick. Three years later, he represented Canada as a whole as a member of the national junior team at the 1998 World Junior Ice Hockey Championships, where he was named an alternate captain. This was the tournament in which Canada had its worst ever showing, an eighth-place finish including a loss to Kazakhstan, giving Brewer an unkind welcome to IIHF international ice hockey. Although eligible for the 1999 edition of the same tournament, Brewer was unable to play due to NHL commitments with the New York Islanders.

Brewer made his debut with the Canadian national men's team on April 24, 2001, when he joined Canada for the 2001 Men's World Ice Hockey Championships in Nuremberg, Cologne, and Hanover, Germany. Later that year, on July 24, 2001, Brewer was invited to the orientation camp for the Canadian team for the 2002 Winter Olympics in Salt Lake City, Utah. Five months later, on December 12, 2001, Brewer was named to the final Canadian roster for the tournament. In the opening game of the tournament against Sweden, Brewer scored Canada's second goal of the game in a 5–2 loss, while in the semi-finals of the tournament, Brewer scored the game-winning goal against Belarus in a 7–1 victory, helping send Canada to the gold medal game against the host United States. Canada would go on to defeat the Americans by a score of 5–2, winning their first Olympic gold medal in fifty years.

Shortly after his Olympic experience, Brewer was named to the Canadian roster for the 2002 Men's World Ice Hockey Championships in Gothenburg, Karlstad and Jönköping, Sweden, his second consecutive Ice Hockey World Championships. He represented Canada once again the following year, when on April 22, 2003, Brewer was named to the Canadian roster for the 2003 Men's World Ice Hockey Championships. In the tournament quarterfinals versus Germany, Brewer scored the game-winning goal 37 seconds into overtime to give Canada a 3–2 victory. Canada would go on to win their first Ice Hockey World Championships gold medal since the 1997 tournament, defeating Sweden 3–2 in overtime in the final. Brewer once again participated for Canada at the 2004 Men's World Ice Hockey Championships, his fourth consecutive Ice Hockey World Championships, where he helped Canada win its second consecutive championship after defeating Sweden 5–3 in the gold medal game.

On May 15, 2004, Brewer was named to the Canadian roster for the 2004 World Cup of Hockey. In the semifinal of the tournament, Brewer scored Canada's first goal of the game in 4–3 overtime victory against the Czech Republic. Team Canada would go on to win the tournament on home ice in Toronto, defeating Finland 3–2 in the final. Just under one year following his World Cup appearance, Brewer was named to the orientation camp for the Canadian team at the 2006 Winter Olympics in Turin, Italy held from August 15–20, 2005, in Vancouver and Kelowna, British Columbia. Following the camp, on October 18, 2005, Brewer was named to the preliminary 81-man Canadian roster for the tournament. However, when the final roster was announced on December 21, 2005, Brewer was not among the 26 players listed. As a result, it would be nearly three years before Brewer would next suit up for his country, when on April 3, 2007, Brewer was among the first five players named to play for Canada at the 2007 IIHF World Championship in Moscow and Mytishchi, Russia. For the tournament, Brewer was named as the team's only permanent alternate captain and helped the team to its third gold medal at the tournament in the past five years.

== Career statistics ==
=== Regular season and playoffs ===
			Regular season					Playoffs
Season	Team	League	GP	G	A	Pts	PIM	GP	G	A	Pts	PIM
1995–96	Prince George Cougars	WHL	63	4	10	14	25	—	—	—	—	—
1996–97	Prince George Cougars	WHL	71	5	24	29	81	15	2	4	6	16
1997–98	Prince George Cougars	WHL	34	5	28	33	45	11	4	2	6	19
1998–99	New York Islanders	NHL	63	5	6	11	32	—	—	—	—	—
1999–00	Lowell Lock Monsters	AHL	25	2	2	4	26	7	0	0	0	0
1999–00	New York Islanders	NHL	26	0	2	2	20	—	—	—	—	—
2000–01	Edmonton Oilers	NHL	77	7	14	21	53	6	1	5	6	2
2001–02	Edmonton Oilers	NHL	81	7	18	25	45	—	—	—	—	—
2002–03	Edmonton Oilers	NHL	80	8	21	29	45	6	1	3	4	6
2003–04	Edmonton Oilers	NHL	77	7	18	25	67	—	—	—	—	—
2005–06	St. Louis Blues	NHL	32	6	3	9	45	—	—	—	—	—
2006–07	St. Louis Blues	NHL	82	6	23	29	69	—	—	—	—	—
2007–08	St. Louis Blues	NHL	77	1	21	22	91	—	—	—	—	—
2008–09	St. Louis Blues	NHL	28	1	5	6	24	—	—	—	—	—
2009–10	St. Louis Blues	NHL	59	8	7	15	46	—	—	—	—	—
2010–11	St. Louis Blues	NHL	54	8	6	14	57	—	—	—	—	—
2010–11	Tampa Bay Lightning	NHL	22	1	1	2	24	18	1	6	7	14
2011–12	Tampa Bay Lightning	NHL	82	1	20	21	49	—	—	—	—	—
2012–13	Tampa Bay Lightning	NHL	48	4	8	12	30	—	—	—	—	—
2013–14	Tampa Bay Lightning	NHL	77	4	13	17	59	4	0	0	0	0
2014–15	Tampa Bay Lightning	NHL	17	0	4	4	18	—	—	—	—	—
2014–15	Anaheim Ducks	NHL	9	1	1	2	6	—	—	—	—	—
2014–15	Toronto Maple Leafs	NHL	18	2	3	5	12	—	—	—	—	—
NHL totals			1,009	77	194	271	792	34	3	14	17	22

=== International ===
Year	Team	Event	GP	G	A	Pts	PIM
1998	Canada	WJC	7	0	2	2	8
2001	Canada	WC	7	0	2	2	6
2002	Canada	OLY	6	2	0	2	0
2002	Canada	WC	7	2	3	5	4
2003	Canada	WC	9	1	2	3	8
2004	Canada	WC	9	1	1	2	6
2004	Canada	WCH	6	1	3	4	6
2007	Canada	WC	9	1	3	4	6
Junior totals			7	0	2	2	8
Senior totals			52	8	14	22	36

== Awards and achievements ==
=== Junior ===
Award	Year(s)	Ref
WHL West Second All-Star Team	1998	

=== NHL ===
Award	Year(s)	Ref
NHL All-Star Game	2003	

== Transactions ==
- June 21, 1997 – Drafted in the first round, fifth overall by the New York Islanders in the 1997 NHL entry draft.
- June 24, 2000 – Traded by the New York Islanders with Josh Green and the Islanders' second round selection (Brad Winchester) in the 2000 NHL entry draft to the Edmonton Oilers for Roman Hamrlík.
- August 2, 2005 – Traded by the Edmonton Oilers with Jeff Woywitka and Doug Lynch to the St. Louis Blues for Chris Pronger.
- February 18, 2011 – Traded by the St. Louis Blues to the Tampa Bay Lightning for Brock Beukeboom and the Blues' third round selection (Jordan Binnington) in the 2011 NHL entry draft.
- November 28, 2014 – Traded by the Tampa Bay Lightning to the Anaheim Ducks for a third round selection in the 2015 NHL entry draft.
- March 2, 2015 – Traded by the Anaheim Ducks to the Toronto Maple Leafs, along with a fifth round selection in the 2016 NHL entry draft, in exchange for Korbinian Holzer.

== See also ==
- List of NHL players with 1,000 games played

Awards and achievements
Preceded by Roberto Luongo	New York Islanders first-round draft pick 1997	Succeeded by Michael Rupp
Sporting positions
Preceded by Dallas Drake	St. Louis Blues captain 2008–11	Succeeded by David Backes
