= Jens Hellgren =

Swedish ice hockey player (born 1989)

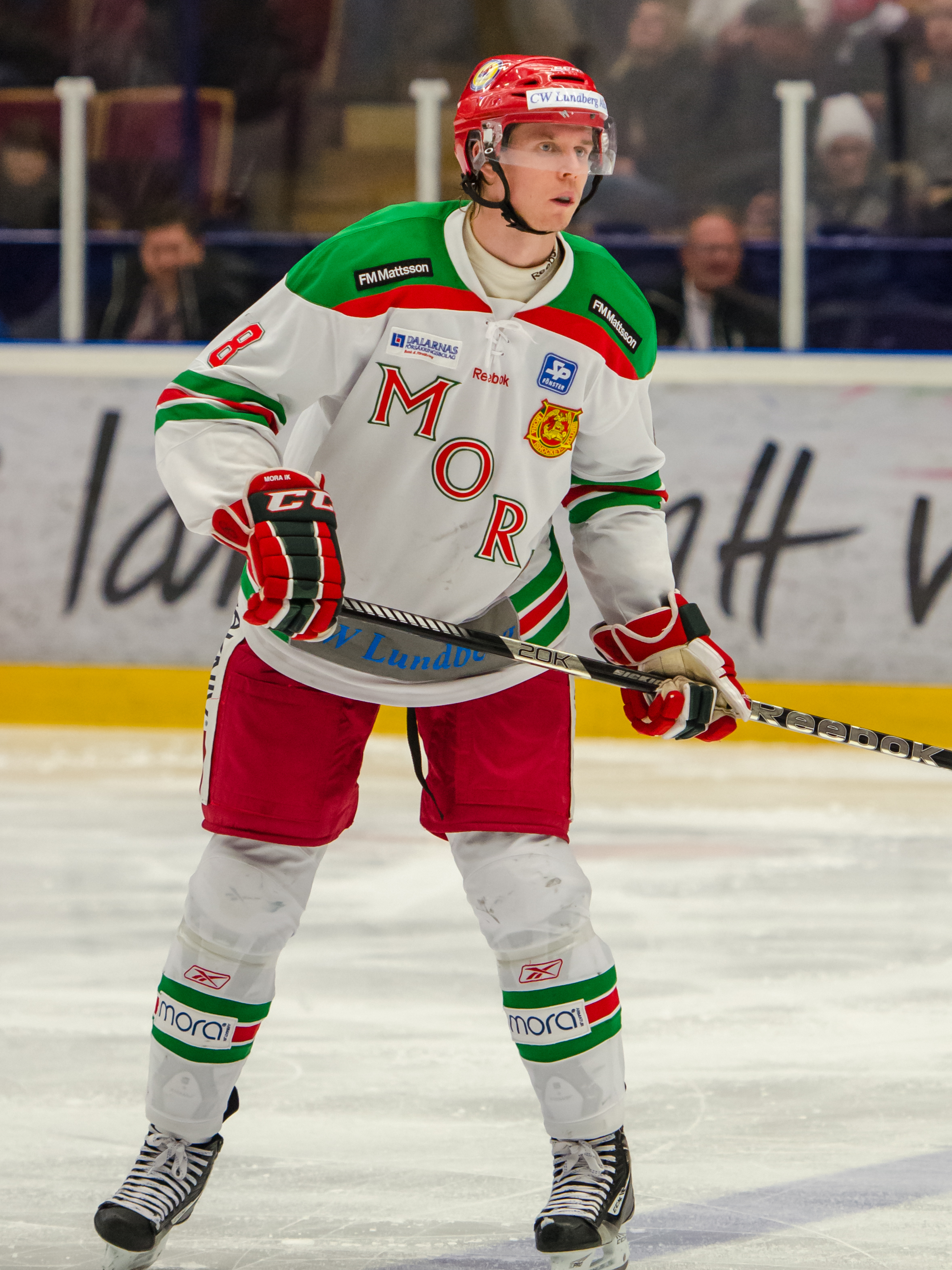
- Born: March 6, 1989 (age 37) Björbo, Sweden
- Height: 6 ft 3 in (191 cm)
- Weight: 185 lb (84 kg; 13 st 3 lb)
- Position: Defence
- Shot: Left
- Played for: Sparta Sarpsborg; Rögle BK
- NHL draft: 155th overall, 2007; Colorado Avalanche
- Playing career: 2008–2021

Jens Hellgren (born March 6, 1989) is a Swedish former professional ice hockey defenceman.

== Playing career ==
Hellgren started playing ice hockey with his home town team Björbo IF, before joining Leksands IF's junior organisation in 2003. In 2005, he represented Dalarna in TV-pucken, the same year he moved to Gothenburg to play for Frölunda HC's junior organisation. In his first season with Frölunda at age 16, he played 22 regular season games in the J20 SuperElit, and six games in the playoffs, winning a silver medal in the Swedish Junior Championship finals. The following season Hellgren appeared in 40 games, scoring four goals and ten points, he went pointless through seven games in the playoffs as Frölunda won the Swedish Junior Championship. His play earned him a spot on Team Sweden's roster for the 2007 IIHF World U18 Championships, where he helped Sweden winning a bronze medal. His achievements during the season led the Colorado Avalanche to select him, 155th overall, in the sixth round of the 2007 NHL entry draft.

During the 2007–08 season Hellgren again appeared in 40 games, improving his point production to four goals and 14 points, he notched one assist in eight playoff games, as Frölunda won their second consecutive Swedish Junior Championship. For the 2008–09 season Hellgren was assigned to Frölunda's HockeyAllsvenskan affiliate Borås HC, in his first year playing senior hockey Hellgren played in 45 games, scoring two goals and eight points, he also played four games for Team Sweden's U20 team, scoring one goal and four points. Borås missed the playoffs and Hellgren signed a one-year contract with Borås for the 2009–10 season.

In his second season with Borås, Hellgren played 50 games, scoring two goals—both being game-winning goals—and one assist while collecting 75 penalty minutes, Borås again missed the playoffs and Hellgren signed a one-year contract extension. Hellgren started the 2010–11 season well but suffered a concussion and did not reach the same level of play after he returned to play, in total Hellgren played 41 games, scoring one goal and seven points.

After the season Hellgren signed a two-year contract with Mora IK. In his second season with Mora, Hellgren was primarily used in a stay-at-home defenseman role, he failed to re-create his previous season highs to respond with only 3 assists in 47 games. On March 25, 2013, Hellgren left Mora and Sweden in signing a one-year deal with Norwegian club, Sparta Sarpsborg of the GET-ligaen. In his solitary season with Sarpsborg in 2013–14, Hellgren contributed with 9 goals and 23 points in 41 games.

On May 14, 2014, Hellgren signed to return to the Allsvenskan on a two-year contract with Rögle BK. Upon Rögle BK's promotion, Hellgren made his long-awaited Swedish Hockey League debut in the 2015–16 season. Appearing in 36 games, he contributed 5 points. On April 11, 2016, reduced to a limited role, Hellgren opted to return to the Allsvenskan in agreeing to a one-year contract with AIK IF.

Following the 2020–21 season, having played in the Hockeyettan captaining Hanhals IF, Hellgren announced his retirement from professional hockey after 13 seasons on 22 March 2021.

== Career statistics ==
=== Regular season and playoffs ===
			Regular season					Playoffs
Season	Team	League	GP	G	A	Pts	PIM	GP	G	A	Pts	PIM
2005–06	Frölunda HC	J18 Allsv	12	1	0	1	2	2	0	0	0	2
2005–06	Frölunda HC	J20	22	0	0	0	4	6	0	0	0	0
2006–07	Frölunda HC	J18	2	0	2	2	0	—	—	—	—	—
2006–07	Frölunda HC	J18 Allsv	1	0	0	0	0	4	2	2	4	6
2006–07	Frölunda HC	J20	40	4	6	10	26	7	0	0	0	2
2007–08	Frölunda HC	J20	40	4	10	14	20	8	0	1	1	2
2008–09	Borås HC	Allsv	45	2	6	8	16	—	—	—	—	—
2009–10	Borås HC	Allsv	50	2	1	3	75	—	—	—	—	—
2010–11	Borås HC	Allsv	41	1	6	7	22	—	—	—	—	—
2011–12	Mora IK	Allsv	50	6	15	21	38	—	—	—	—	—
2012–13	Mora IK	Allsv	47	0	3	3	20	—	—	—	—	—
2012–13	Mora IK	J20	2	0	0	0	2	—	—	—	—	—
2013–14	Sparta Warriors	NOR	41	9	14	23	20	5	1	3	4	4
2014–15	Rögle BK	Allsv	45	2	12	14	18	10	0	1	1	6
2015–16	Rögle BK	SHL	36	1	4	5	6	—	—	—	—	—
2015–16	Rögle BK	J20	2	0	0	0	0	—	—	—	—	—
2016–17	AIK	Allsv	46	4	8	12	16	8	1	2	3	0
2017–18	HC Vita Hästen	Allsv	49	5	14	19	38	—	—	—	—	—
2018–19	HC Vita Hästen	Allsv	50	0	5	5	28	—	—	—	—	—
2019–20	HC Vita Hästen	Allsv	39	0	5	5	8	1	0	0	0	0
2020–21	Hanhals IF	SWE.3	29	6	4	10	30	—	—	—	—	—
Allsv totals			462	22	75	97	279	29	2	5	7	8
SHL totals			36	1	4	5	6	—	—	—	—	—

Medal record

Representing Sweden

Ice hockey

World U18 Championship
Bronze medal – third place	2007 Tampere	

=== International ===
Year	Team	Event	Result	GP	G	A	Pts	PIM
2006	Sweden	IH18	4th	4	0	2	2	0
2007	Sweden	WJC18	3rd place, bronze medalist(s)	6	0	0	0	6
Junior totals				10	0	2	2	6
