= 2014–15 NHL season =

National Hockey League season

- League: National Hockey League
- Sport: Ice hockey
- Duration: October 8, 2014 – June 15, 2015
- Games: 82
- Teams: 30
- TV partner(s): CBC, Sportsnet/SN1/SN360, Citytv, FX, TVA Sports (Canada); NBCSN, NBC, CNBC, USA (United States)

Draft
- Top draft pick: Aaron Ekblad
- Picked by: Florida Panthers

Regular season
- Presidents' Trophy: New York Rangers
- Season MVP: Carey Price (Canadiens)
- Top scorer: Jamie Benn (Stars)

Playoffs
- Playoffs MVP: Duncan Keith (Blackhawks)

Stanley Cup
- Champions: Chicago Blackhawks
- Runners-up: Tampa Bay Lightning

NHL seasons
- 2013–14 2015–16

The 2014–15 NHL season was the 98th season of operation (97th season of play) of the National Hockey League (NHL). The Phoenix Coyotes changed their name to the Arizona Coyotes before the season.

The Los Angeles Kings became the first team to miss the playoffs after winning the Stanley Cup the previous season since the Carolina Hurricanes in 2006–07. The Boston Bruins also became the third defending Presidents' Trophy winner to miss the playoffs (and the first since the Buffalo Sabres missed the playoffs in 2007–08 after winning the Presidents' Trophy in 2007). The Winnipeg Jets clinched a playoff berth for the first time since the team's relocation from Atlanta in 2011. The San Jose Sharks' playoff streak ended at 10 years. The Ottawa Senators also became the first team in NHL history to make the postseason after trailing for the final playoff spot by 14 points. The playoffs ended with the Chicago Blackhawks defeating the Tampa Bay Lightning in six games to win the 2015 Stanley Cup Final.

== League business ==
=== Agreement with GoPro ===
Midway through the season, the league signed an agreement with GoPro to use the company's wearable cameras to record content for the league's television broadcasts and other video productions. They were first used by players in the All-Star Game.

=== Entry draft ===
The NHL Board of Governors approved changes to the draft lottery format on June 24, 2014, starting with the 2015 Draft. Beginning in 2015, the odds of winning the first overall pick will be adjusted down for the first four lowest point-gaining teams, and adjusted up for the following ten. The change was made to "reflect the current state of competitive balance in the League." In 2016, the Draft Lottery will be used to choose the first three overall picks, not just the first.

The 2014 NHL entry draft was then held on June 27–28, 2014, at the Wells Fargo Center in Philadelphia, Pennsylvania. Aaron Ekblad was selected first overall by the Florida Panthers.

=== Rule changes ===
The following rule changes were voted upon by the NHL Board of Governors in June and were approved by the Players' Association in September 2014.

- The trapezoidal areas behind each net in which goaltenders are allowed to play the puck are to be made 4 feet (1.2 m) wider than their current width.
- The width of the hashmarks outside the faceoff circles will be extended from their current 3.5 feet to five feet, seven inches apart (international markings).
- Before any overtime period, both teams will change ends, and the ice will be dry-scraped by an ice resurfacer. The league hopes that the "long line changes" and the better ice surfaces will increase scoring in overtime, and thus decrease shootouts.
- Coaches no longer have to submit a list of shootout participants as it begins. The coaches will be free as to who they will pick next.
- Teams that ice the puck can only use one center to take the ensuing faceoff. If that player attempts to get kicked out of the faceoff to buy his team time, he'll get a two-minute delay-of-game penalty.
- The NHL's "situation room" will have more latitude to conduct video reviews of goals that don't fall under the guidelines of what can be reviewed, but that clearly weren't scored legally.
- The wording "embellishment" will be changed to allow an escalating scale of fines to repeat-offense players and coaches.
- The "spin-o-rama" will no longer be allowed on penalty shots and during the shootout.

At the league's General Managers Meeting in November, it was decided to immediately end the dry-scrape before overtime, as it was felt that the average time of five minutes was too long, and it seemed to have no significant difference. The GMs also voted to allow officials in the Situation Room to buzz the arena to have play immediately stopped for a video review without waiting for a whistle.

=== Uniforms ===
- The Anaheim Ducks added a new away jersey to match the alternate "webbed D" as their new primary jersey, replacing the old home/road jerseys that bore the "Anaheim Ducks" word mark on the crest.
- As part of the deal approved by the City of Glendale to keep the team from relocating, the Phoenix Coyotes changed their name to the Arizona Coyotes. There will also be a throwback alternate based on the Kachina-styled jerseys they wore from 1996 to 2003.
- The Chicago Blackhawks NHL Winter Classic uniform was inspired by the 1957–58 jersey worn by the Chicago Blackhawks. This uniform is nearly identical to the road uniform that the Blackhawks currently wear. The main differences between this design and the current road design come in the form of the lace-up collar, the name/number block font (which is serifed), and the C-Tomahawk logo, which is mostly red, black, and white (with a tad bit of yellow) instead of being mostly red, yellow, green, black, and white.
- The Columbus Blue Jackets wore a special patch to commemorate hosting the 60th National Hockey League All-Star Game.
- The Los Angeles Kings wore alternate throwbacks based on their inaugural 1967 gold uniforms, instead of the purple ones they have been wearing since 2011. The Kings' 2015 NHL Stadium Series featured the top half of the jersey in silver, the bottom half in white, and a black horizontal stripe running through the middle of the jersey behind the team crest. On the collar are two crowns, one for each Stanley Cup "crown" the team has won throughout its franchise history. On the white pants is a large "LA" logo as seen on the jersey. The numbers on the back and sleeves were enlarged.
- On December 5, Montreal Canadiens added a number 4 patch to their jerseys on the upper-right corner in memory of their former captain, Jean Beliveau, who died on December 2 at the age of 83, for the remainder of the season.
- The New York Islanders wore a special shoulder patch during their final season playing inside Nassau Veterans Memorial Coliseum, and replaced their black third jerseys with the jerseys they wore in the 2014 NHL Stadium Series. The venue has served the franchise for 43 years.
- The Philadelphia Flyers wore their 2012 Winter Classic jersey as a full-time third jersey during the season.
- The Pittsburgh Penguins wore a throwback alternate jersey, featuring the shade of gold the team wore on the uniforms from 1980 to 2002 (the color has been recently referred to as "Pittsburgh gold") instead of Vegas Gold, which the team has been wearing in its primary home and road uniforms since 2002. The jersey was revealed via the club's Twitter page on September 19, and they resemble the black (road) jerseys the team wore during the two seasons it won its two first Stanley Cups, 1991 and 1992.
- The San Jose Sharks' Stadium Series uniform featured the top half in teal, bottom half in black, with a horizontal white stripe separating the two. Centred on the white stripe is the San Jose Sharks logo. The entire back of the jersey is teal with large player numbers in white (extremely large on the sleeve). On the shoulder is a new logo paying homage to San Jose's Northern California fans, a star placed in the location of San Jose. The numbers on the back and sleeves have been enlarged.
- The St. Louis Blues had new home and away jerseys; the alternate remained along with the new set. The uniforms reflect a modernized version of the classic traditional look worn by the team from 1997 to 2007. The uniform leaves the long-lasting, iconic Blue Note unchanged, symbolizing the club's pride and history. The team is not the first to move from a jersey design that was modernized by Reebok when the league started using the new Edge jersey template in the 2007–08 season, to a cleaner, more traditional look. The change removes the irregular curves on the cuff stripes and the apron string piping.
- The Tampa Bay Lightning replaced the alternate jersey they wore with the "BOLTS" script on the front from 2008 until 2014 with a new black alternate. The new third jersey is black and features the popular BOLTS logo from previous seasons across the front, with white trim and has blue and gray as secondary colors. The club also wore a black version of their signature lightning bolt pants and black gloves as part of their new third jersey system.
- On November 26, the Vancouver Canucks added a patch decal "PQ" in memory of Pat Quinn to their helmets for the remainder of the season. Quinn died on November 23 at the age of 71.
- The Washington Capitals NHL Winter Classic uniform was vintage deep red to symbolize hockey's deep roots in Washington. The stripes on the shoulders, waist, and legs bring in elements of Washington professional hockey jerseys from the 1930s, predating the Capitals' formation in the 1970s. A large "W" on the front of the jersey, offset in blue to contrast the white Capitals wordmark, offered a unique look never seen before on Capitals jerseys. A large "W" on the front of the jersey is offset in blue to contrast the white Capitals wordmark and features a silhouette of the Washington Monument. They also wore special patches to commemorate their 40th NHL season.
- For the 2015 NHL All-Star Game, the two teams wore black/neon green jerseys, a far cry from any other jersey that has been used for the special game.

== Arena changes ==
- The renamed Arizona Coyotes' home arena, Jobing.com Arena, was renamed Gila River Arena as part of a new naming rights agreement with Gila River Casinos.
- The Tampa Bay Lightning's home arena, the Tampa Bay Times Forum, was renamed Amalie Arena as part of a new naming rights agreement with Amalie Oil Company.

== Regular season ==
The regular season began on October 8, 2014, and ended on April 11, 2015. Both the first Saturday (October 11) and the last day (April 11) of the regular season featured 15 games (all 30 teams).

=== Coaching changes ===
Coaching changes
Offseason
Team	2013–14 coach	2014–15 coach	Story/accomplishments
Carolina Hurricanes	Kirk Muller	Bill Peters	Muller was fired on May 5, 2014, after accumulating an 80–80–27 record in three seasons and failing to clinch a playoff berth in each season. On June 19, Peters succeeded after serving three seasons as an assistant coach with the Detroit Red Wings.
Florida Panthers	Kevin Dineen, Peter Horachek*	Gerard Gallant	Dineen, was fired after starting the season 3–9–4. Dineen had coached since the start of the 2011–12 season, winning the Southeast Division title and with team earning a playoff berth for the first time in ten seasons during that first season. Horachek, the head coach of their AHL affiliate, San Antonio Rampage was hired to be the interim head coach. Horachek was fired after the end of the season on April 29, 2014, after going 26–36–4. On June 21, Gallant succeeded after serving two seasons as an assistant coach with the Montreal Canadiens.
Nashville Predators	Barry Trotz	Peter Laviolette	Trotz was fired on April 14, 2014, after fifteen seasons. He was the first coach of the Predators. He accumulated a 557–479–160 regular season record and a 19–31 playoff record. On May 6, Laviolette succeeded after serving six seasons as head coach with the Philadelphia Flyers.
Pittsburgh Penguins	Dan Bylsma	Mike Johnston	Byslma was fired on June 6, 2014, after serving on the team from 2009 to 2014. He accumulated a 252–117–32 regular season record and a 43–35 postseason record. In 2009, he guided the team to win the Stanley Cup. For his efforts during the 2010–11 season, he was awarded the Jack Adams Award as the league's most outstanding coach. On June 25, Johnston succeeded after serving on the Portland Winterhawks as a head coach from 2008 to 2014.
Vancouver Canucks	John Tortorella	Willie Desjardins	Tortorella was fired after one season on May 1, 2014, after going 36–35–11 and failing to make the playoffs. On June 23, Desjardins succeeded after two seasons as head coach with the Texas Stars.
Washington Capitals	Adam Oates	Barry Trotz	On April 26, 2014, Oates was fired after failing to make the playoffs for the first time since 2007. In his two seasons as head coach, he compiled a 65–48–17 record. The team made it to the playoffs once in his tenure, winning the Southeast Division in 2013. On May 26, Trotz succeeded after fifteen seasons as head coach with Nashville Predators.
In-season
Team	Outgoing coach	Incoming coach	Story/accomplishments
Ottawa Senators	Paul MacLean	Dave Cameron	MacLean was fired on December 8, 2014, after posting a record of 11–11–5 through 27 games this season. He served as the head coach since the start of the 2011–12 season. He left with a 114–90–35 record over parts of four seasons. The team made the postseason twice under his tenure despite going 8–9. For his efforts during the 2012–13 season, he was awarded the Jack Adams Award as the league's most outstanding coach. On December 8, Cameron accepted the promotion from assistant to head coach. He served as an assistant since the 2011–12 season.
Edmonton Oilers	Dallas Eakins	Todd Nelson*	Eakins was fired on December 15, 2014, after posting a 7–19–5 record through 31 games this season. He served as the head coach since the start of the 2013–14 season. He left with a 36–62–14 record over parts of two seasons, failing to make the playoffs during each of his years as head coach. On December 15, Nelson, who was coaching the Oklahoma City Barons of the American Hockey League at the time, received the call for the head coaching vacancy with the main club.
New Jersey Devils	Peter DeBoer	Adam Oates and Scott Stevens	DeBoer was fired on December 26, 2014, after posting a 12–17–7 record through 36 games this season. He served as the head coach since the start of the 2011–12 season. He left with a 114–93–41 record over parts of four seasons. He guided the Devils to the 2012 Stanley Cup Final where they lost in six games to the Los Angeles Kings. On December 27, the Devils revealed that Adam Oates and Scott Stevens will both take over as the head coach for the remainder of the season. They both served as assistant coaches before the promotion to become co-head coaches.
Toronto Maple Leafs	Randy Carlyle	Peter Horachek*	Carlyle was fired on January 6, 2015, after posting a 21–16–3 record through 40 games this season. He served as the head coach since March 2012. He left with a 91–78–19 record over parts of four seasons. In 2012–13, he guided the team to its first postseason since the 2003–04 season. On January 7, Peter Horachek accepted the promotion from assistant to interim head coach. He served as an assistant since July 11, 2014.

(*) indicates interim.

=== Winter Classic ===
The 2015 NHL Winter Classic, the annual regular season outdoor game, was held on January 1 at Nationals Park, Washington, D.C. The game, the seventh Winter Classic, featured the Chicago Blackhawks and the Washington Capitals.

=== Stadium Series ===
Only one regular season outdoor game in the NHL Stadium Series was scheduled this season: The San Jose Sharks hosted the Los Angeles Kings on February 21 at Levi's Stadium in Santa Clara, California.

=== All-Star Game ===
The 60th National Hockey League All-Star Game was an exhibition ice hockey game played on January 25, 2015. The game was held in Columbus, Ohio, at Nationwide Arena, home of the Columbus Blue Jackets. This was Columbus's first time hosting the NHL All-Star Game.

This was originally scheduled to take place on January 27, 2013, in Columbus, Ohio. It was canceled as a result of the ongoing 2012–13 NHL lockout. There was no all-star game last season due to the 2014 Winter Olympics in Sochi, Russia.

=== Postponed games ===
The Toronto Maple Leafs–Ottawa Senators game originally scheduled for October 22 was postponed due to the 2014 shootings at Parliament Hill, Ottawa. The game was rescheduled for November 9.

The New York Rangers–Buffalo Sabres game originally scheduled for November 21 was postponed due to the winter weather-related difficulties in the area. The game was rescheduled for February 20, 2015, displacing a Sabres home game with the Senators that was originally scheduled for the same day. That game was moved to December 15, 2014, as a result of the rescheduling of the Rangers–Sabres game.

=== League-wide mumps outbreak ===
The 2014–15 NHL season saw an unprecedented outbreak of mumps at the beginning of the season among many players on multiple different teams. Infected players included Corey Perry and Francois Beauchemin of the Anaheim Ducks, Derick Brassard and two other players on the New York Rangers, Sidney Crosby and four other players on the Pittsburgh Penguins, four players on the New Jersey Devils and five players on the Minnesota Wild. The league, teams and players then implemented several sanitary procedures, and the last reported mumps case occurred on January 11.

== Standings ==
=== Eastern Conference ===
Top 3 (Metropolitan Division)
Pos	Team	GP	W	L	OTL	ROW	GF	GA	GD	Pts
1	p – New York Rangers	82	53	22	7	49	252	192	+60	113
2	x – Washington Capitals	82	45	26	11	40	242	203	+39	101
3	x – New York Islanders	82	47	28	7	40	252	230	+22	101

Source: National Hockey League
p – Clinched Presidents' Trophy; x – Clinched playoff spot

Top 3 (Atlantic Division)
Pos	Team	GP	W	L	OTL	ROW	GF	GA	GD	Pts
1	y – Montreal Canadiens	82	50	22	10	43	221	189	+32	110
2	x – Tampa Bay Lightning	82	50	24	8	47	262	211	+51	108
3	x – Detroit Red Wings	82	43	25	14	39	235	221	+14	100

Source: National Hockey League
x – Clinched playoff spot; y – Clinched division

Eastern Conference Wild Card
Pos	Div	Team	GP	W	L	OTL	ROW	GF	GA	GD	Pts
1	AT	x – Ottawa Senators	82	43	26	13	37	238	215	+23	99
2	ME	x – Pittsburgh Penguins	82	43	27	12	39	221	210	+11	98
3	AT	Boston Bruins	82	41	27	14	37	213	211	+2	96
4	AT	Florida Panthers	82	38	29	15	30	206	223	−17	91
5	ME	Columbus Blue Jackets	82	42	35	5	33	236	250	−14	89
6	ME	Philadelphia Flyers	82	33	31	18	30	215	234	−19	84
7	ME	New Jersey Devils	82	32	36	14	27	181	216	−35	78
8	ME	Carolina Hurricanes	82	30	41	11	25	188	226	−38	71
9	AT	Toronto Maple Leafs	82	30	44	8	25	211	262	−51	68
10	AT	Buffalo Sabres	82	23	51	8	15	161	274	−113	54

Source: National Hockey League
x – Clinched playoff spot

=== Western Conference ===
Top 3 (Central Division)
Pos	Team	GP	W	L	OTL	ROW	GF	GA	GD	Pts
1	y – St. Louis Blues	82	51	24	7	42	248	201	+47	109
2	x – Nashville Predators	82	47	25	10	41	232	208	+24	104
3	x – Chicago Blackhawks	82	48	28	6	39	229	189	+40	102

Source: National Hockey League
x – Clinched playoff spot; y – Clinched division

Top 3 (Pacific Division)
Pos	Team	GP	W	L	OTL	ROW	GF	GA	GD	Pts
1	z – Anaheim Ducks	82	51	24	7	43	236	226	+10	109
2	x – Vancouver Canucks	82	48	29	5	42	242	222	+20	101
3	x – Calgary Flames	82	45	30	7	41	241	216	+25	97

Source: National Hockey League
x – Clinched playoff spot; z – Clinched conference

Western Conference Wild Card
Pos	Div	Team	GP	W	L	OTL	ROW	GF	GA	GD	Pts
1	CE	x – Minnesota Wild	82	46	28	8	42	231	201	+30	100
2	CE	x – Winnipeg Jets	82	43	26	13	36	230	210	+20	99
3	PA	Los Angeles Kings	82	40	27	15	38	220	205	+15	95
4	CE	Dallas Stars	82	41	31	10	37	261	260	+1	92
5	CE	Colorado Avalanche	82	39	31	12	29	219	227	−8	90
6	PA	San Jose Sharks	82	40	33	9	36	228	232	−4	89
7	PA	Edmonton Oilers	82	24	44	14	19	198	283	−85	62
8	PA	Arizona Coyotes	82	24	50	8	19	170	272	−102	56

Source: National Hockey League
x – Clinched playoff spot

Tie Breakers:
1. Fewer number of games played.
2. Greater Regulation + OT Wins (ROW)
3. Greater number of points earned in head-to-head play. (If teams played an unequal # of head-to-head games, the result of the first game on the home ice of the team with the extra home game is discarded.)
4. Greater Goal differential

- Washington was given the higher Metropolitan division seed than the NY Islanders due to a higher goal differential (39 to 22)

== Player statistics ==
=== Scoring leaders ===
The following players led the league in regular-season points at the conclusion of games played on April 11, 2015.

Player	Team	GP	G	A	Pts	+/–	PIM
Jamie Benn	Dallas Stars	82	35	52	87	+1	64
John Tavares	New York Islanders	82	38	48	86	+5	46
Sidney Crosby	Pittsburgh Penguins	77	28	56	84	+5	47
Alexander Ovechkin	Washington Capitals	81	53	28	81	+10	58
Jakub Voracek	Philadelphia Flyers	82	22	59	81	+1	78
Nicklas Backstrom	Washington Capitals	82	18	60	78	+5	40
Tyler Seguin	Dallas Stars	71	37	40	77	−1	20
Jiri Hudler	Calgary Flames	78	31	45	76	+17	14
Daniel Sedin	Vancouver Canucks	82	20	56	76	+5	18
Vladimir Tarasenko	St. Louis Blues	77	37	36	73	+27	31

=== Leading goaltenders ===
The following goaltenders led the league in regular season goals against average at the conclusion of games played on April 11, 2015, while playing at least 1800 minutes.

Player	Team	GP	TOI	W	L	OTL	GA	SO	SV%	GAA
Carey Price	Montreal Canadiens	66	3976:33	44	16	6	130	9	.933	1.96
Devan Dubnyk	Arizona/Minnesota	58	3328:12	36	14	4	115	6	.929	2.07
Pekka Rinne	Nashville Predators	64	3850:47	41	17	6	140	4	.923	2.18
Cam Talbot	New York Rangers	34	2094:57	21	9	4	77	5	.926	2.21
Braden Holtby	Washington Capitals	73	4247:29	41	20	10	157	9	.923	2.22
Jonathan Quick	Los Angeles Kings	72	4184:15	36	22	13	156	6	.918	2.24
Henrik Lundqvist	New York Rangers	46	2742:36	30	13	3	103	5	.922	2.25
Steve Mason	Philadelphia Flyers	51	2885:23	18	18	11	108	3	.928	2.25
Cory Schneider	New Jersey Devils	69	3923:55	26	31	9	148	5	.925	2.26
Brian Elliott	St. Louis Blues	46	2545:48	26	14	3	96	5	.917	2.26

== Playoffs ==
=== Bracket ===
In each round, teams competed in a best-of-seven series following a 2–2–1–1–1 format (scores in the bracket indicate the number of games won in each best-of-seven series). The team with home ice advantage played at home for games one and two (and games five and seven, if necessary), and the other team was at home for games three and four (and game six, if necessary). The top three teams in each division made the playoffs, along with two wild cards in each conference, for a total of eight teams from each conference. The Wild Card seeded in the Western Conference is Central 1 vs Wild Card 1 and Pacific 1 vs Wild Card 2 in the and in Eastern Conference is Atlantc 1 vs Wild Card 1 and Metropolitan 1 vs Wild Card 2.

In the first round, the lower seeded wild card in each conference was played against the division winner with the best record while the other wild card was played against the other division winner, and both wild cards were de facto #4 seeds. The other series matched the second and third-place teams from the divisions. In the first two rounds, home ice advantage was awarded to the team with the better seed. In the conference finals and Stanley Cup Final, home ice advantage was awarded to the team with the better regular season record.

First round	Second round
A1	Montreal	4
WC1	Ottawa	2
A1	Montreal	2
A2	Tampa Bay	4
A2	Tampa Bay	4
A3	Detroit	3
Eastern Conference
M1	NY Rangers	4
WC2	Pittsburgh	1
M1	NY Rangers	4
M2	Washington	3
M2	Washington	4
M3	NY Islanders	3
C1	St. Louis	2
WC1	Minnesota	4
WC1	Minnesota	0
C3	Chicago	4
C2	Nashville	2
C3	Chicago	4
Western Conference
P1	Anaheim	4
WC2	Winnipeg	0
P1	Anaheim	4
P3	Calgary	1
P2	Vancouver	2
P3	Calgary	4

Conference finals
A2	Tampa Bay	4
M1	NY Rangers	3
C3	Chicago	4
P1	Anaheim	3

Stanley Cup Finals
A2	Tampa Bay	2
C3	Chicago	4

== NHL awards ==
Awards were presented at the NHL Awards ceremony, to be held following the 2015 Stanley Cup playoffs. Finalists for voted awards are announced during the playoffs and winners are presented at the award ceremony. Voting will conclude immediately after the end of the regular season. The Presidents' Trophy, the Prince of Wales Trophy and Clarence S. Campbell Bowl are not presented at the awards ceremony.

2014–15 NHL awards
Award	Recipient(s)	Runner(s)-up/Finalists
Presidents' Trophy (Best regular season record)	New York Rangers	Montreal Canadiens
Prince of Wales Trophy (Eastern Conference playoff champion)	Tampa Bay Lightning	New York Rangers
Clarence S. Campbell Bowl (Western Conference playoff champion)	Chicago Blackhawks	Anaheim Ducks
Art Ross Trophy (Player with most points)	Jamie Benn (Dallas Stars)	John Tavares (New York Islanders)
Bill Masterton Memorial Trophy (Perseverance, Sportsmanship, and Dedication)	Devan Dubnyk (Minnesota Wild)	Andrew Hammond (Ottawa Senators); Kris Letang (Pittsburgh Penguins)
Calder Memorial Trophy (Best first-year player)	Aaron Ekblad (Florida Panthers)	Johnny Gaudreau (Calgary Flames); Mark Stone (Ottawa Senators)
Conn Smythe Trophy (Most valuable player, playoffs)	Duncan Keith (Chicago Blackhawks)	Patrick Kane (Chicago Blackhawks)
Frank J. Selke Trophy (Defensive forward)	Patrice Bergeron (Boston Bruins)	Anze Kopitar (Los Angeles Kings); Jonathan Toews (Chicago Blackhawks)
Hart Memorial Trophy (Most valuable player, regular season)	Carey Price (Montreal Canadiens)	Alexander Ovechkin (Washington Capitals); John Tavares (New York Islanders)
Jack Adams Award (Best coach)	Bob Hartley (Calgary Flames)	Peter Laviolette (Nashville Predators); Alain Vigneault (New York Rangers)
James Norris Memorial Trophy (Best defenceman)	Erik Karlsson (Ottawa Senators)	Drew Doughty (Los Angeles Kings); P. K. Subban (Montreal Canadiens)
King Clancy Memorial Trophy (Leadership and humanitarian contribution)	Henrik Zetterberg (Detroit Red Wings)	Patrice Bergeron (Boston Bruins); Ryan Getzlaf (Anaheim Ducks)
Lady Byng Memorial Trophy (Sportsmanship and excellence)	Jiri Hudler (Calgary Flames)	Pavel Datsyuk (Detroit Red Wings); Anze Kopitar (Los Angeles Kings)
Ted Lindsay Award (Outstanding player)	Carey Price (Montreal Canadiens)	Jamie Benn (Dallas Stars); Alexander Ovechkin (Washington Capitals)
Mark Messier Leadership Award (Leadership and community activities)	Jonathan Toews (Chicago Blackhawks)	Ryan Getzlaf (Anaheim Ducks); Andrew Ladd (Winnipeg Jets)
Maurice "Rocket" Richard Trophy (Top goal-scorer)	Alexander Ovechkin (Washington Capitals)	Steven Stamkos (Tampa Bay Lightning)
NHL Foundation Player Award (Award for community enrichment)	Brent Burns (San Jose Sharks)	Mark Giordano (Calgary Flames); Henrik Lundqvist (New York Rangers)
NHL General Manager of the Year Award (Top general manager)	Steve Yzerman (Tampa Bay Lightning)	Bob Murray (Anaheim Ducks); Glen Sather (New York Rangers)
Vezina Trophy (Best goaltender)	Carey Price (Montreal Canadiens)	Devan Dubnyk (Arizona Coyotes/Minnesota Wild); Pekka Rinne (Nashville Predators)
William M. Jennings Trophy (Goaltender(s) of team with fewest goals against)	Carey Price (Montreal Canadiens) and Corey Crawford (Chicago Blackhawks)	Henrik Lundqvist and Cam Talbot (New York Rangers)

=== All-Star teams ===
Position	First Team	Second Team	Position	All-Rookie
G	Carey Price, Montreal Canadiens	Devan Dubnyk, Minnesota Wild	G	Jake Allen, St. Louis Blues
D	Erik Karlsson, Ottawa Senators	Shea Weber, Nashville Predators	D	Aaron Ekblad, Florida Panthers
D	P. K. Subban, Montreal Canadiens	Drew Doughty, Los Angeles Kings	D	John Klingberg, Dallas Stars
C	John Tavares, New York Islanders	Sidney Crosby, Pittsburgh Penguins	F	Filip Forsberg, Nashville Predators
RW	Jakub Voracek, Philadelphia Flyers	Vladimir Tarasenko, St. Louis Blues	F	Johnny Gaudreau, Calgary Flames
LW	Alexander Ovechkin, Washington Capitals	Jamie Benn, Dallas Stars	F	Mark Stone, Ottawa Senators

== Milestones ==
=== First games ===
The following is a list of notable players who played their first NHL game during the 2014–15 season, listed with their first team:

Player	Team	Notability
Sam Bennett	Calgary Flames	Conn Smythe Trophy winner
Leon Draisaitl	Edmonton Oilers	Art Ross Trophy winner, Hart Memorial Trophy winner, Ted Lindsay Award winner, Maurice "Rocket" Richard Trophy winner, three-time NHL All-Star team selection, five-time NHL All-Star
Aaron Ekblad	Florida Panthers	First overall pick in the 2014 draft, Calder Memorial Trophy winner, two-time NHL All-Star, NHL All-Rookie Team selection
William Karlsson	Anaheim Ducks	Lady Byng Memorial Trophy winner
David Pastrnak	Boston Bruins	Maurice "Rocket" Richard Trophy winner, five-time NHL All-Star team selection, four-time NHL All-Star
Andrei Vasilevskiy	Tampa Bay Lightning	Two-time Vezina Trophy winner, Conn Smythe Trophy winner, four-time NHL All-Star team selection, five-time NHL All-Star

=== Last games ===
The following is a list of players of note who played their last NHL game in 2014–15, listed with their team:

Player	Team	Notability
Eric Brewer	Toronto Maple Leafs	Over 1000 games played.
Daniel Briere	Colorado Avalanche	Over 1000 games played.
Martin Brodeur	St. Louis Blues	5-time William M. Jennings Trophy winner, 4-time Vezina Trophy winner, Calder Memorial Trophy winner, 3-time Stanley Cup winner with the Devils, over 1400 games played.
Ray Emery	Philadelphia Flyers	William M. Jennings Trophy winner.
Sergei Gonchar	Montreal Canadiens	2-time NHL All-Star, 1-time Stanley Cup winner with the Penguins, over 1300 games played.
Dany Heatley	Anaheim Ducks	Calder Memorial Trophy winner, 1-time NHL All-Star.
Olli Jokinen	St. Louis Blues	Over 1200 games played.
Evgeni Nabokov	San Jose Sharks	Calder Memorial Trophy winner, 1-time NHL All-Star, over 300 career NHL wins.
Chris Phillips	Ottawa Senators	Over 1100 games played.
Robyn Regehr	Los Angeles Kings	1-time Stanley Cup winner with the Kings, over 1000 games played.
Martin St. Louis	New York Rangers	Hart Memorial Trophy winner, 3-Time Lady Byng Memorial Trophy winner, 2-time Art Ross Trophy winner, 1-time Stanley Cup winner with the Lightning, Lester B. Pearson Award winner, 5-time NHL All-Star, over 1100 games played.
Kimmo Timonen	Chicago Blackhawks	1-time Stanley Cup winner with the Blackhawks, over 1000 games played.
Lubomir Visnovsky	New York Islanders	NHL second All-Star team.
Stephen Weiss	Florida Panthers → Detroit Red Wings	Hold Florida Panthers record for games played and assists.

=== Major milestones reached ===
- On October 14, 2014, referee Mike Leggo worked his 1,000th game against the Edmonton Oilers and the Los Angeles Kings at the Staples Center.
- On October 14, 2014, San Jose Sharks defenceman Scott Hannan participated in his 1,000th NHL game.
- On October 14, 2014, Darryl Sutter became the fastest Los Angeles Kings coach to reach 100 wins. Sutter reached the milestone in his 183rd game. Former Kings coach Terry Murray got his 100th win in his 197th game.
- On October 23, 2014, Los Angeles Kings goaltender Jonathan Quick has set a new franchise record with his 33rd career shutout, surpassing Rogie Vachon.
- On October 26, 2014, Chicago Blackhawks goaltender Scott Darling made his NHL debut on October 26, 2014, starting in goal against the Ottawa Senators, making 32 saves in the 2–1 win. Darling became the first former Southern Professional Hockey League player to play in an NHL game.
- On October 28, 2014, Vancouver Canucks goaltender Ryan Miller earned his 300th win, becoming the 30th goaltender in league history to reach this milestone.
- On October 30, 2014, Chicago Blackhawks forward Marian Hossa scored his 1,000th career point with a goal against the team that originally drafted him back in 1997, the Ottawa Senators. Hossa became the 80th player in NHL history to reach the milestone. This game was also the 1,100th game of his National Hockey League career.
- On November 4, 2014, Washington Capitals forward Alexander Ovechkin became the franchise's leading scorer with his 826th point which came in the first-period on an assist against the Calgary Flames, surpassing Peter Bondra.
- On November 11, 2014, Arizona Coyotes head coach Dave Tippett became the longest tenured head coach in franchise history when he reached 391 games, surpassing Bobby Francis.
- On November 16, 2014, Chicago Blackhawks forward Brad Richards participated in his 1,000th NHL game.
- On November 21, 2014, New Jersey Devils goaltender Cory Schneider broke Martin Brodeur's franchise record when he started in his 20th consecutive game to start the season.
- On November 23, 2014, Vancouver Canucks forward Daniel Sedin participated in his 1,000th NHL game.
- On November 24, 2014, Pittsburgh Penguins goaltender Marc-Andre Fleury earned his 300th win. With 300 wins in 547 NHL games, Fleury is the fourth-fastest NHL goaltender to reach this milestone.
- On November 28, 2014 New York Rangers forward Martin St. Louis recorded a goal and an assist against the Philadelphia Flyers to reach 1,000 points in his career. He became the sixth undrafted player in NHL history to reach the milestone.
- On November 29, 2014, Ottawa Senators forward David Legwand participated in his 1,000th career game. He would score the lone goal for the Senators in a 4–1 loss to the Lightning in Tampa Bay.
- On December 5, 2014, Calgary Flames head coach Bob Hartley reached 400 wins. He previously coached the Colorado Avalanche (from 1998 to 2002) and Atlanta Thrashers (from 2002 to 2007). With the victory he became just the 33rd coach in NHL history to win 400 regular season games.
- On December 6, 2014, Detroit Red Wings head coach Mike Babcock reached 500 wins, making him the second fastest to reach the milestone. He pulled off the feat in 895 games over 12 seasons between Anaheim and Detroit.
- On December 9, 2014, New Jersey Devils forward Jaromir Jagr played his 1,500th career game, scoring a goal and an assist in a 2–1 win over the Carolina Hurricanes, while passing Marcel Dionne into 5th on the career points list.
- On December 16, 2014, the Washington Capitals and Florida Panthers went to 20-rounds in the shootout breaking the previous record for longest shootout of 15-rounds set on November 26, 2005, between the Washington Capitals and New York Rangers.
- On December 18, 2014, Colorado Avalanche defenceman Brad Stuart participated in his 1,000th NHL game.
- On December 28, 2014, New Jersey Devils forward Scott Gomez participated in his 1,000th NHL game.
- On December 31, 2014, Colorado Avalanche forward Borna Rendulic became the first Croatian-born player to score a goal in the NHL.
- On January 3, 2015, New Jersey Devils forward Jaromir Jagr become the oldest player to score a hat trick (42 years, 322 days against the Philadelphia Flyers) eclipsing Gordie Howe (41 years, Nov. 2, 1969 against the Pittsburgh Penguins).
- On January 6, 2015, New Jersey Devils forward Patrik Elias became the 82nd player in NHL history to record 1,000 career points. He recorded one goal and two assists in the contest.
- On January 12, 2015, Washington Capitals forward Alexander Ovechkin scored his 74th game-winning goal against the Colorado Avalanche, surpassing Peter Bondra for the all-time franchise lead in game-winning goals.
- On January 13, 2015, Winnipeg Jets head coach Paul Maurice won his 500th game.
- On February 5, 2015, Ottawa Senators defenceman Chris Phillips became the all-time franchise leader in games played with 1,179, surpassing Daniel Alfredsson.
- On February 9, 2015, Columbus Blue Jackets forward Scott Hartnell participated in his 1,000th NHL game.
- On February 14, 2015, New York Rangers head coach Alain Vigneault became the 21st coach in NHL history to reach 500 wins.
- On March 4, 2015, New York Rangers defenceman Dan Boyle participated in his 1,000th NHL game.
- On March 4, 2015, Colorado Avalanche forward Alex Tanguay participated in his 1,000th NHL game.
- On March 9, 2015, Evgeny Romasko became the first Russian referee to officiate an NHL game, working the contest against the Edmonton Oilers and the Detroit Red Wings at Joe Louis Arena.
- On March 12, 2015, St. Louis Blues head coach Ken Hitchcock won his 700th game, becoming the fourth coach in league history to reach this milestone.
- On March 17, 2015, St. Louis Blues goaltender Brian Elliott set a franchise record as he recorded his 21st shutout, surpassing Jaroslav Halak.
- On March 19, 2015, Florida Panthers forward Jaromir Jagr passed Phil Esposito for fifth on the NHL all-time goals list when he scored his 718th against the Detroit Red Wings.
- On March 21, 2015, Toronto Maple Leafs defenceman Eric Brewer participated in his 1,000th NHL game.
- On March 23, 2015, Ottawa Senators goaltender Andrew Hammond became the first goaltender in league history to help his team earn at least a point in each of his first 15 starts, going 14–0–1 in that stretch.
- On March 29, 2015, referee Kevin Pollock worked his 1,000th game against the San Jose Sharks and the Pittsburgh Penguins at the CONSOL Energy Center.
- On March 31, 2015, referee Brad Meier worked his 1,000th game against the Carolina Hurricanes and the Washington Capitals at the Verizon Center.
- On March 31, 2015, Washington Capitals forward Alexander Ovechkin scored his 50th goal of the season. This is the sixth time in his career that he has scored at least 50 goals in a season and becomes the sixth player in NHL history to achieve this feat. He joins Wayne Gretzky and Mike Bossy, who have done this nine times and Mario Lemieux, Guy Lafleur and Marcel Dionne who also have done it six times.
- On April 9, 2015, Florida Panthers forward Jaromir Jagr become the fourth player to score 1,800 points in his career, earning two assists in a 4–2 win over the Boston Bruins, and taking sole possession of fourth on the career points list. He started the season tied with Steve Yzerman for seventh in the all-time list, and passed him, Marcel Dionne, and Ron Francis over the course of the season.
- On April 11, 2015, Florida Panthers forward Jaromir Jagr overtook Adam Oates for sole possession of sixth on the career assists list with 1,080. He had started the year in eighth and had overtaken Steve Yzerman earlier in the season. He later added a power-play goal to tie Gretzky for 14th all-time and extend his career record for game-winning goals to 129. He ended the season with his 1,550th regular season game, moving into 11th on the all-time list.

== Broadcast rights ==
=== Canada ===
The 2014–15 season brought a significant realignment for NHL broadcast rights in Canada, as it marked the first year of Rogers Communications' 12-year, CA$5.2 billion contract for exclusive national television and digital media rights to the league. The networks of Sportsnet (including the Sportsnet regional channels, Sportsnet One, and Sportsnet 360) replaced TSN as the English-language cable broadcasters of the league. National French-language rights were sub-licensed by Rogers to Quebecor Media, with TVA Sports replacing RDS as the national French-language television broadcaster of the NHL in Canada.

CBC Television, the previous over-the-air television broadcaster of the NHL, continues to participate in coverage to an extent: Rogers reached a deal with CBC to license the Hockey Night in Canada brand and maintain the network's traditional Saturday night games, along with postseason coverage and exclusive coverage of the Stanley Cup Final. HNIC began to air across CBC, City, the Sportsnet networks, and FX Canada (typically an all-U.S. game). As part of the arrangement, CBC did not pay a rights fee to either Rogers or the NHL, but all the telecasts are brokered and produced by Sportsnet. CBC is allotted advertising time during the games to promote its own programming, but Rogers receives all ad revenue from the telecasts. City also introduced a new primetime game of the week on Sunday nights, known as Rogers Hometown Hockey, which was hosted on-location from various cities by Ron MacLean. Similarly to TSN under the previous contract, Sportsnet also has a flagship, national Wednesday night game.

With the loss of national cable rights, TSN expanded its regional coverage of the NHL using its new TSN3, TSN4 and TSN5 channels. The three channels broadcast regional Winnipeg Jets, Toronto Maple Leafs, and Ottawa Senators games respectively. Regional rights to the Toronto Maple Leafs were split between TSN4 and Sportsnet Ontario beginning this season, with TSN4 airing 26 of these games (Bell and Rogers own a joint majority stake in the team's parent company Maple Leaf Sports & Entertainment). TSN5 began airing regional Senators games as part of a new 12-year deal between the team and TSN's parent company Bell Media (which also included French-language regional rights for RDS, and an extension of CFGO's radio rights), replacing Sportsnet East. The Senators were replaced on Sportsnet East by the Montreal Canadiens under a new three-year deal with Rogers.

TVA Sports' national French-language coverage consisted of themed games on selected nights of the week; its flagship telecasts, La super soirée LNH, primarily aired the Montreal Canadiens' Saturday night games, along with the All-Star Game, Winter Classic, and Stanley Cup playoffs. RDS continued its long-standing relationship with the Montreal Canadiens for French-language television coverage under a new, 12-year regional contract. As such, French-language broadcasts of the Canadiens on RDS are now blacked out for viewers outside of the team's home market of Quebec and eastern Canada.

=== United States ===
This was the fourth season under the NHL's ten-year U.S. rights deal with NBC Sports. NBC began airing selected Stanley Cup playoff games on the USA Network, marking the first time that the channel televised NHL games since 1985.

== See also ==
- 2014–15 NHL suspensions and fines
- 2014–15 NHL transactions
- Lester Patrick Trophy
