= Jonathan Toews =

Canadian ice hockey player (born 1988)

OM Jonathan Toews
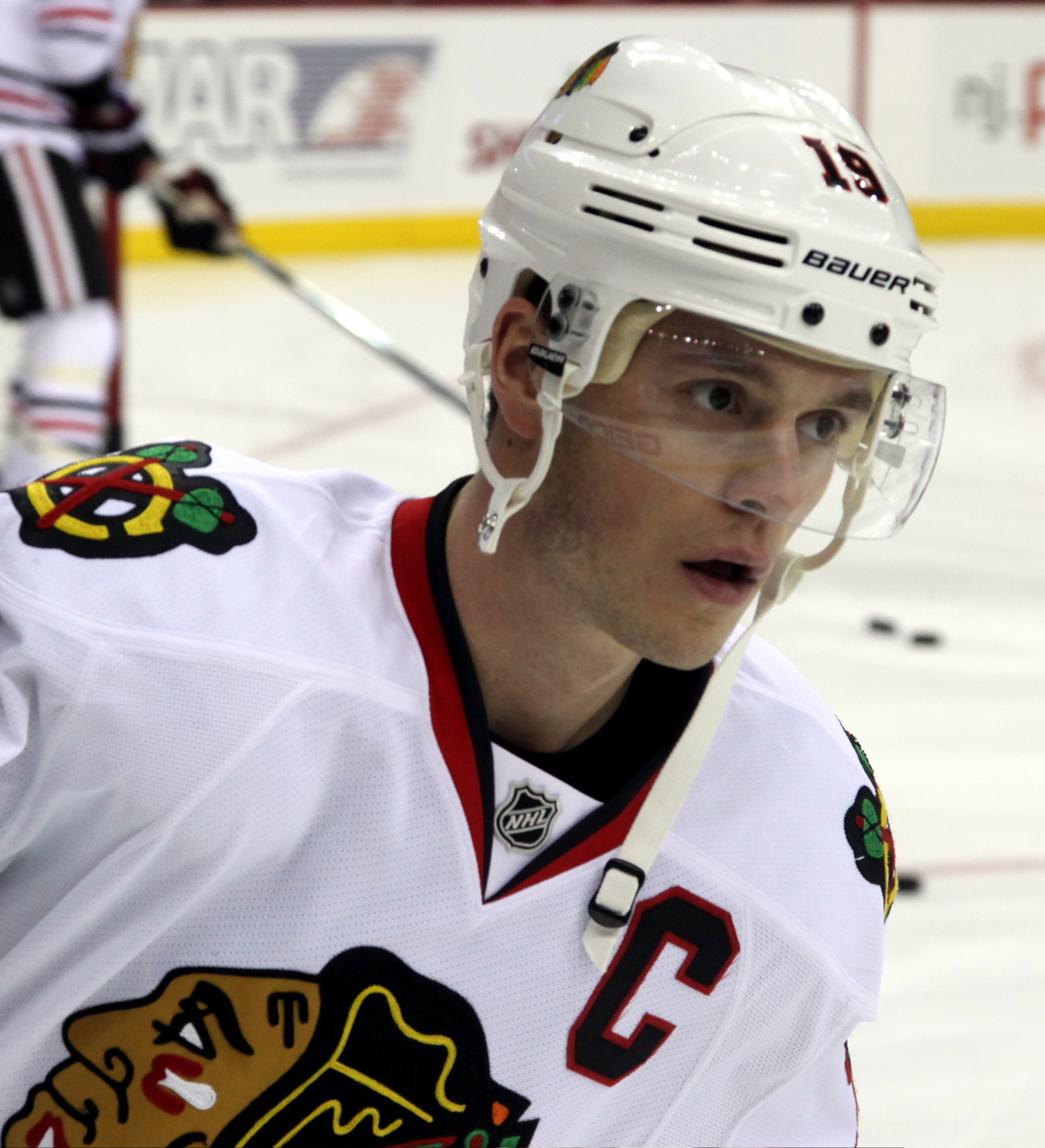
- Toews with the Chicago Blackhawks in December 2014
- Born: April 29, 1988 (age 38) Winnipeg, Manitoba, Canada
- Height: 6 ft 2 in (188 cm)
- Weight: 201 lb (91 kg; 14 st 5 lb)
- Position: Centre
- Shot: Left
- Played for: Chicago Blackhawks; Winnipeg Jets
- National team: Canada
- NHL draft: 3rd overall, 2006; Chicago Blackhawks
- Playing career: 2007–2026

Jonathan Bryan Toews (/teɪvz/ TAYVZ; born April 29, 1988) is a Canadian former professional ice hockey player. He played as a centre for the Chicago Blackhawks and Winnipeg Jets of the National Hockey League (NHL), serving as the captain of the Blackhawks from 2008 to 2023. Nicknamed "Captain Serious", Toews was selected by the Blackhawks with the third overall pick in the 2006 NHL entry draft. He joined the team in 2007–08 and was nominated for the Calder Memorial Trophy as NHL Rookie of the Year. The following season he was named team captain, becoming the second-youngest captain in NHL history (after Sidney Crosby) at the time. Toews won the Stanley Cup in 2010, along with the Conn Smythe Trophy for the most valuable player in the playoffs. After winning the Cup, Toews passed Peter Forsberg as the youngest player to join the Triple Gold Club. He won the Stanley Cup again in 2013 and 2015.

Toews competed internationally for Canada national teams and won gold medals at the 2005 World U-17 Hockey Challenge, 2006 and 2007 World Junior Championships, 2007 World Championships, 2010 Winter Olympics (a tournament in which he was named best forward) and 2014 Winter Olympics. In 2017, he was named one of the 100 Greatest NHL Players.

== Early life ==
Jonathan was born to Bryan Toews, an electrician at the University of Manitoba, and Andrée Gilbert, a native of Sainte-Marie, Quebec, who was the managing director and finance expert for a credit union in the Winnipeg region before retiring to oversee Toews's media relations. He is bilingual, speaking fluent French and English.

Like Toews, his brother David also attended Shattuck-Saint Mary's and began his freshman year at the University of North Dakota in 2008–09. His cousin Kai Toews is a professional basketball player.

== Playing career ==
=== Amateur ===
Toews was selected first overall in the 2003 WHL Bantam draft by the Tri-City Americans, but chose instead to play midget AAA hockey at Shattuck-Saint Mary's, a boarding school in Faribault, Minnesota, during the 2003–04 and 2004–05 seasons. The decision enabled him to retain his NCAA eligibility. Toews scored 110 points in 64 games in his second season with Shattuck-Saint Mary's before moving on to play college ice hockey.

Toews played two seasons at the University of North Dakota, compiling 85 points (40 goals and 45 assists), a +38 plus-minus rating and a 56.7% faceoff winning percentage in 76 games. He helped UND reach the NCAA Frozen Four in both 2006 and 2007, serving as an alternate captain in his sophomore season. Toews registered 39 points as a freshman and earned Rookie of the Week honours twice. He helped North Dakota capture the Broadmoor Trophy as Western Collegiate Hockey Association (WCHA) conference champions and also was named West Regional MVP after tallying five points.

Going into the 2006 NHL entry draft, Toews was ranked third among North American prospects by the NHL Central Scouting Bureau, and was ultimately chosen third overall by the Chicago Blackhawks.

=== Chicago Blackhawks (2007–2023) ===
==== Early seasons (2007–2009) ====
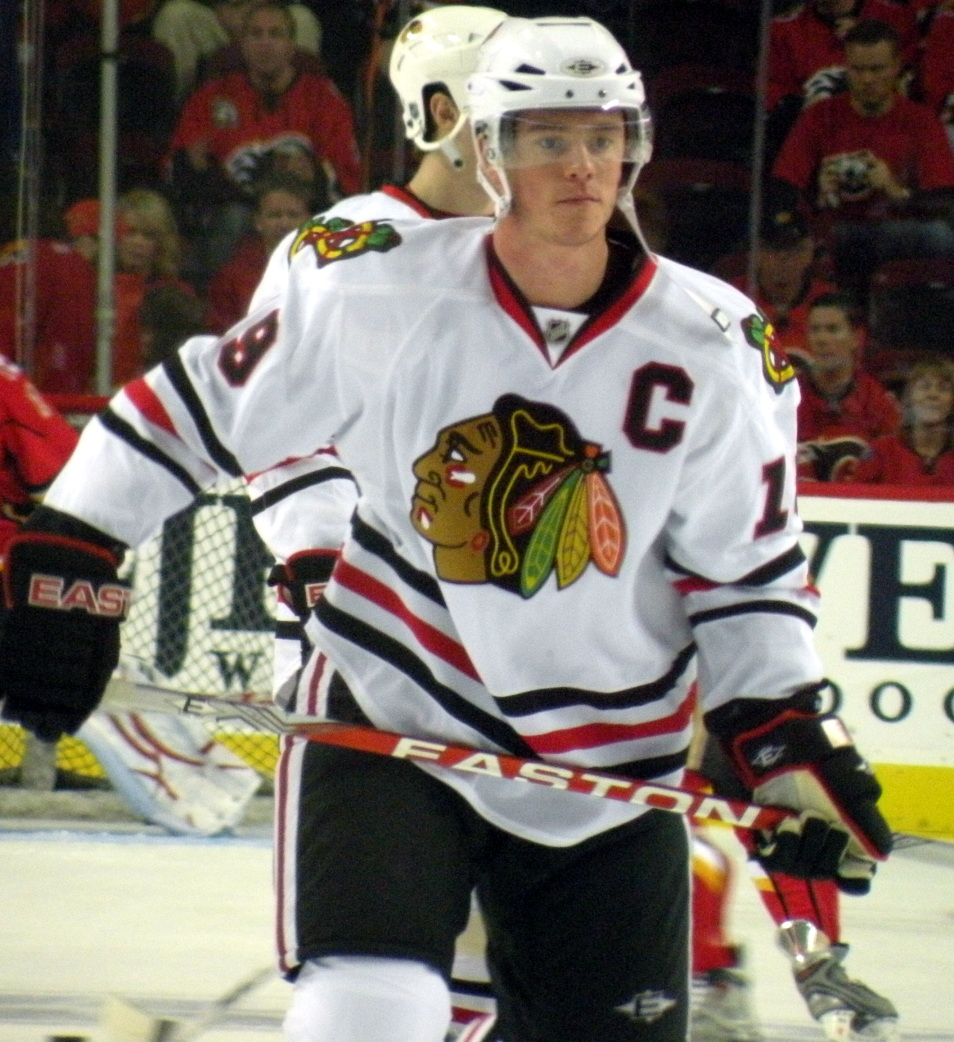
Toews in April 2009

In 2007–08, he opted out of his final two years of college hockey eligibility to debut with the Blackhawks after signing a three-year, entry-level contract on May 16, 2007. He scored his first career NHL goal on his first shot in his first game on October 10, 2007, against the San Jose Sharks. He then recorded the second-longest point-scoring streak to start an NHL career, registering a point in each of his first ten games (five goals and five assists). On January 1, 2008, Toews sprained his knee in a game against the Los Angeles Kings. Despite missing 16 games from the injury, Toews led all rookies in goal-scoring and finished third in points. Toews finished second in team scoring behind fellow rookie Patrick Kane. Toews and Kane battled all season for the lead in team and rookie scoring before Toews went down to injury. The two were both nominated for the Calder Memorial Trophy as NHL rookie of the year along with Washington Capitals forward Nicklas Bäckström; Toews finished third in voting behind Bäckström and winner Kane.

Following his successful rookie campaign, Toews was named team captain of the Blackhawks on July 18, 2008. At 20 years and 79 days, he became the third-youngest team captain in NHL history, behind Sidney Crosby and Vincent Lecavalier. This feat was later surpassed by Gabriel Landeskog and Connor McDavid. Toews had previously been named an alternate captain in December 2007, during the 2007–08 season. In the subsequent season, he was voted as a starter, along with teammates Patrick Kane and Brian Campbell, for the 2009 NHL All-Star Game in Montreal, Quebec. He netted his first career hat-trick in the NHL on February 27, 2009, in a 5–4 overtime loss to the Pittsburgh Penguins. Toews finished the 2008–09 season with 69 points (34 goals, 35 assists) in all 82 games, helping the Blackhawks to their first Stanley Cup playoff appearance since 2002. He then added 13 points in 17 playoff games as the Blackhawks advanced to the Western Conference final, where they were eliminated by the defending Stanley Cup champion Detroit Red Wings in five games.

==== Dynasty years (2010–2017) ====
Less than a month into the 2009–10 season, Toews was sidelined with concussion-like symptoms after receiving an open-ice hit from defenceman Willie Mitchell in a 3–2 loss to the Vancouver Canucks on October 21, 2009. Toews had his head down while receiving a pass in the neutral zone when Mitchell left the penalty box and checked him with his shoulder. Toews was sidelined for six games before returning to the line-up. In the final year of his contract, Toews, as well as teammates Duncan Keith and Patrick Kane, agreed to extensions in early-December 2009. His deal was structured similarly to Kane's, worth about $6.5 million annually for five seasons. On March 5, 2010, Toews recorded his 100th NHL assist on a goal scored by Jordan Hendry in a 6–3 win over the Vancouver Canucks. Toews finished the season with 68 points (25 goals, 43 assists) in 76 games. During the second round of the 2010 playoffs, Toews recorded his second career hat-trick, along with two assists on goals by Patrick Sharp and Brent Seabrook, leading the Blackhawks in a 7–4 playoff victory against the Vancouver Canucks on May 7. On June 9, Toews led Chicago to the franchise's first Stanley Cup championship since 1961, defeating the Philadelphia Flyers in game six of the Final. He became the second-youngest captain in the history of the NHL to win the Cup, behind Sidney Crosby, who led the Pittsburgh Penguins to the championship the previous season. Toews scored seven goals and 22 assists for 29 points in all 22 games in the playoffs, and won the Conn Smythe Trophy as playoff MVP. By winning the Stanley Cup, he also became the youngest player, at 22 years of age, to become a member of the Triple Gold Club (Olympic gold, the Stanley Cup and World Championship).

In the off-season, Toews was selected to be the cover player for EA Sports' video game NHL 11 on June 21, 2010. It marked the first time in EA Sports history that two players of the same team were featured on a video game cover two years in a row, as teammate Patrick Kane had been on the cover of NHL 10.

On December 28, 2010, Toews suffered a shoulder injury in a 3–1 loss to the St. Louis Blues as a result from a hard check from Blues' forward Matt D'Agostini. He was initially expected to miss two weeks but returned to the lineup after only one week with only two games missed. On January 16, 2011, Toews scored his 100th NHL goal in a 6–3 win over the Nashville Predators on Predators goaltender Anders Lindbäck. During the 2010–11 season, Toews recorded a career-high 76 points (32 goals, 44 assists) in 80 games. The defending Stanley Cup champion Blackhawks narrowly qualified for the 2011 playoffs, ending the season as the eighth and final seed in the Western Conference, beating out the Dallas Stars for the final playoff spot by just two points after both the Blackhawks and Stars lost their season finales against the Detroit Red Wings and Minnesota Wild, respectively. Down three games to none in the opening round against the Presidents' Trophy-winning Vancouver Canucks, the Blackhawks won three straight games to force a deciding game seven. In the contest on April 26, 2011, Toews scored a short-handed game-tying goal on Canucks goaltender Roberto Luongo with 1:56 remaining in regulation to force overtime. This would be Toews's only goal of the series as Canucks forward Alex Burrows went on to score five minutes into the ensuing overtime period to eliminate the Blackhawks. Toews had four points (a goal and three assists) in the seven-game series. Toews was named a finalist for the Frank J. Selke Trophy as the best defensive forward (along with Pavel Datsyuk of the Detroit Red Wings and Ryan Kesler of the Vancouver Canucks, respectively) for the first time in his career, which was ultimately awarded to Kesler.

Toews was to play in the 2012 All-Star Game, but an injury sustained during a 5–2 loss to the Nashville Predators on January 21, 2012, kept him from playing; he was replaced by Scott Hartnell. Toews finished the 2011–12 season with 57 points (29 goals, 28 assists) in an injury-shortened year as the Blackhawks as a team finished the season as the sixth seed in the Western Conference. He returned to play in the first game in the opening round 2012 playoffs against the third seeded Phoenix Coyotes on April 12. Toews scored the overtime winner against Coyotes goaltender Mike Smith in game five on April 21 to send the series back to Chicago for game six, In game six on April 23, the Coyotes won the game 4–0 to eliminate the Blackhawks from the playoffs with a 4–2 series defeat.

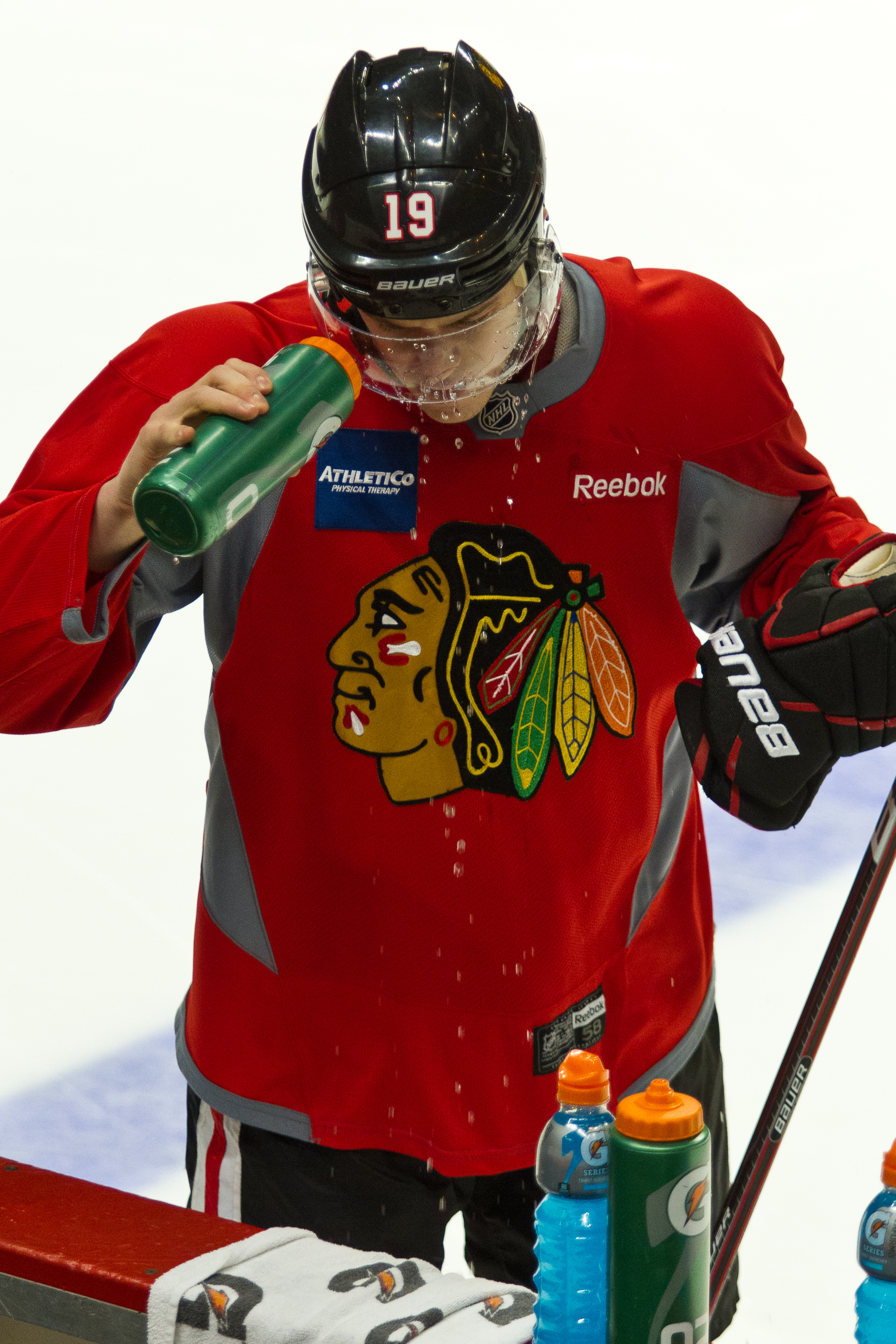
Toews during a Blackhawks practice in December 2011

In the lockout-shortened season of 2012–13, Toews returned to top form. He helped the Blackhawks win the Presidents' Trophy as the team with the best record in the regular season. In the 2013 playoffs, Toews led the Blackhawks to the Final over the Boston Bruins and assisted on the game tying goal scored by Bryan Bickell in game six on June 24, 2013, Chicago's second title in four seasons. At the end of the year, he was also awarded the Frank J. Selke Trophy as the League's top defensive forward beating out fellow finalists Boston Bruins forward Patrice Bergeron and Detroit Red Wings forward Pavel Datsyuk and was named to the NHL second All-Star team.

Toews recorded the second natural hat-trick of his NHL career on October 29, 2013, against Craig Anderson of the Ottawa Senators. The 2013–14 season finished as another productive campaign for Toews. In 76 games, he scored 28 goals and 40 assists for 68 points and throughout the season earned the moniker "Captain Serious" by his peers. The Blackhawks' 2014 playoff run lasted to overtime of game seven of the Western Conference final against the eventual Stanley Cup champion Los Angeles Kings, and Toews put up 17 points (nine goals and eight assists) in all 19 games. For the second year in a row, he finished as a finalist for the Selke Trophy, though he came third in voting behind the winner Patrice Bergeron of the Boston Bruins and first runner-up Anže Kopitar of the Los Angeles Kings.

On July 9, 2014, the Blackhawks announced that Toews, along with teammate Patrick Kane, had signed an eight-year extension with the Blackhawks at an average annual salary of $10.5 million. The contract came into effect on July 1, 2015, for the 2015–16 season. During game seven of the 2015 Western Conference final on May 30, 2015, Toews scored the game's first two goals en route to a 5–3 victory over the Anaheim Ducks and 4–3 series victory. In the Final, Toews led the Blackhawks to their third Stanley Cup championship in six seasons after the team's game six victory over the Tampa Bay Lightning, 2–0 for a 4–2 series win. On June 24, Toews was named the recipient of the Mark Messier Leadership Award, awarded to the individual "in recognition of his commitment and service to charities in his community," as well as exemplifying a superior leadership ability in hockey, beating-out fellow finalists Ryan Getzlaf and Andrew Ladd. Toews also won an ESPY Award for 'Best NHL Player' in 2015. Electronic Arts selected Toews to appear on the cover of NHL 16.

Toews was selected to play in the 2016 All-Star Game, but missed the game on account of illness. He was suspended for one game per NHL rules for not attending the All-Star game.

On November 23, 2016, Toews suffered a back injury in a 2–1 loss against the San Jose Sharks that forced him to miss nine games. He was voted into the 2017 National Hockey League All-Star Game.

==== Later career, illness, and missed seasons (2017–2024) ====
Toews's productivity declined during the 2017–18 season, where he posted a career-low 52 points (20 goals, 32 assists) in 74 games and the Blackhawks would miss the playoffs for the first time since 2008, Toews's rookie season and the first time under his captaincy.

In the 2018 off-season, Toews adopted a new training regimen and nutrition plan to help him better prepare for the upcoming season. Despite the Blackhawks missing the playoffs for the second straight season, an individually rejuvenated Toews tallied a career-high 35 goals, 46 assists and 81 points while appearing in all 82 contests for Chicago during the 2018–19 season.

Toews appeared in all 70 games during the 2019–20 season, which ended three weeks early due to the COVID-19 pandemic restrictions. He recorded 18 goals and 42 assists for 60 points during the campaign. Toews also totaled a team-high nine points in nine games during the 2020 playoffs.

On December 29, 2020, shortly before the start of the pandemic-shortened 2020–21 season, the Blackhawks announced Toews would be out indefinitely while recovering from an undisclosed illness. He missed the entire season before announcing in June 2021 that he was diagnosed with chronic inflammatory response syndrome (CIRS) and that he planned to return for the 2021–22 season.

In September 2021, he said an antibody test revealed he had COVID-19 at some point during the previous season. Despite this, Toews played his 1,000th NHL game against the Florida Panthers on March 31, 2022. Toews appeared in 71 games for the Blackhawks, where he recorded 12 goals and 25 assists for a career-low 37 points. He also maintained a 57% faceoff win-rate, which was third best in the NHL among centres with at least 1,000 faceoff draws.

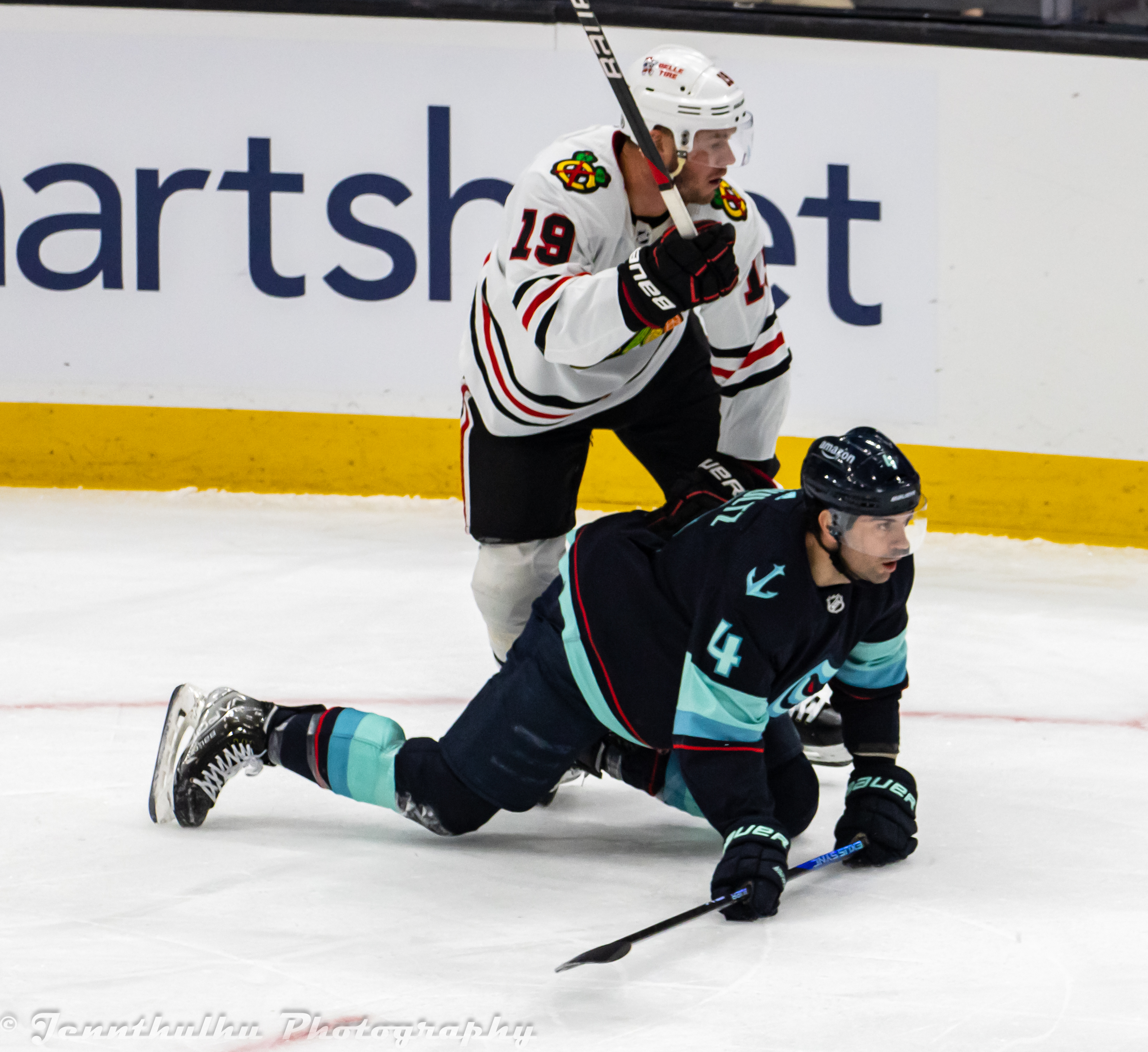
Toews (left) battling with Justin Schultz in April 2023

Toews bounced back during the first half of the 2022–23 season with 14 goals and assists for 28 points in 46 appearances. However, Toews's health deteriorated midway through the season causing him to miss several weeks. He announced on February 19, 2023, that he was still suffering from symptoms of long COVID and CIRS. He offered no timetable for his return, commenting, "it has reached the point where I had no choice but to step back and concentrate on getting healthy." Toews returned to the Blackhawks' lineup after a two-month absence on April 1, against the New Jersey Devils. On April 13, Blackhawks general manager Kyle Davidson announced that the team would not re-sign Toews after his contract expired at the end of the season.

On August 17, 2023, Toews announced he was not retiring from the NHL, but rather sitting out the 2023–24 season to focus on his health. Approximately a year and a half later, on March 10, 2025, Toews confirmed in an interview with The Athletic that he intended to return in time for the 2025–26 season, but did not seek a return to the Blackhawks.

=== Winnipeg Jets and retirement (2025–2026) ===
On June 20, 2025, the Winnipeg Jets, Toews's hometown team, announced that he would be joining the team for the 2025–26 season on a one-year contract. Playing his first season in two years, Toews suited up for all 82 of Winnipeg's games, scoring 11 goals and recording 18 assists for a total of 29 points, though Winnipeg missed the playoffs. The Professional Hockey Writers' Association voted Toews a finalist for the Bill Masterton Memorial Trophy, awarded to "the player who best exemplifies the qualities of perseverance, sportsmanship and dedication to hockey." He finished third in voting, behind Buffalo Sabres defenceman Rasmus Dahlin and Colorado Avalanche forward Gabriel Landeskog, who won the trophy.

Following the season, Toews announced his retirement on June 19, 2026. Toews finished his career with 912 points in 1,149 games across 16 seasons in the NHL, not including the seasons he missed due to illness and injury. At the time of his retirement, he still held the record for being the youngest player to join the Triple Gold Club, and had one of the highest faceoff percentages in league history.

== International play ==
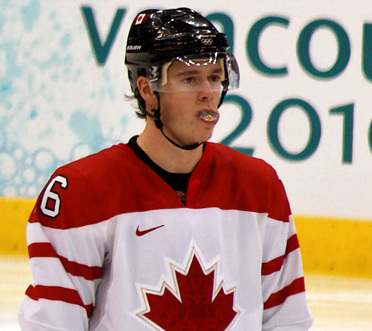
- Toews with the Canadian national men's hockey team in the 2010 Winter Olympics

Medal record

Men's ice hockey

Representing Canada

Olympic Games
Gold medal – first place	2010 Vancouver	
Gold medal – first place	2014 Sochi	

World Championships
Gold medal – first place	2007 Russia	
Silver medal – second place	2008 Canada	

Canada Cup / World Cup
Gold medal – first place	2016 Toronto	

World Junior Championships
Gold medal – first place	2006 Canada	
Gold medal – first place	2007 Sweden	

Representing Canada West

World U-17 Hockey Challenge
Gold medal – first place	2005 Alberta	

In 2005, Toews captained Canada West at the World U-17 Hockey Challenge to a gold medal. He scored the game-winning goal in a 3–1 win over Canada Pacific in the championship game. He finished with 12 points, ranked first in tournament scoring, and was named tournament MVP.

In his draft year, Toews competed on Canada's junior team at the 2006 World Junior Championships as the youngest player on the team. He tallied two assists during the tournament, both against Norway in preliminary play, as Canada ultimately defeated Russia in the gold medal game, 5–0.

In 2007, Toews earned a second-straight World Junior gold medal. In the tournament semifinal against the United States, Toews scored three times in the shootout to advance to the final. With seven points, Toews led Canada in scoring and was named to the Tournament All-Star team alongside teammate Carey Price. Shortly after his gold medal win, Toews was honoured by his hometown American Hockey League (AHL) team, the Manitoba Moose, on February 3, 2007, as he was presented with an honorary jersey for his tournament efforts.

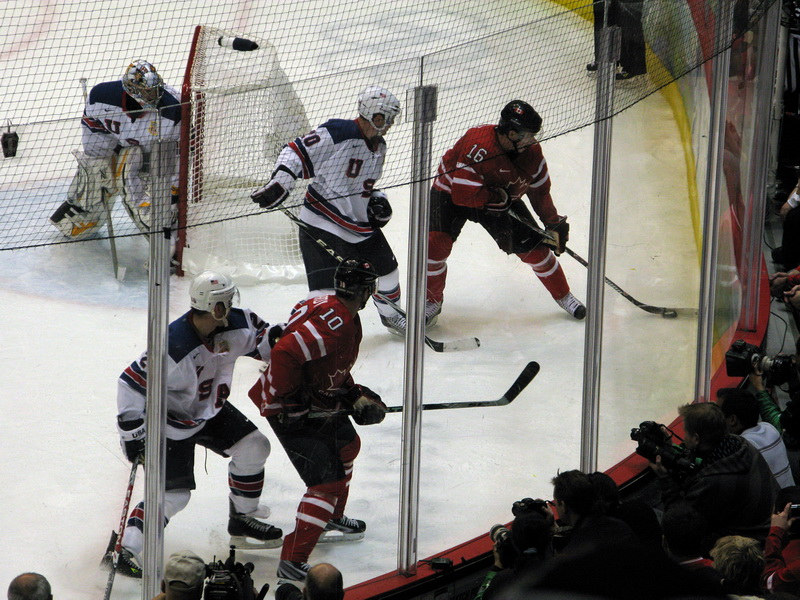
Toews guards the puck from Ryan Suter during the 2010 Winter Olympics.

That same year, Toews also made his senior international debut at the 2007 World Championships and recorded seven points in nine games competing against mostly professional players after just his second year of college hockey (at the time of selection, Toews had not yet turned professional). Canada earned gold over Finland 4–2 in the championship game. After the victory, Toews became the first Canadian to win a World Junior championship and a World Championship in the same year. On June 29, 2007, Toews was awarded the Order of the Buffalo Hunt, an award given by the Province of Manitoba in honour of sporting achievements, for his play in the junior and senior world championships.

After Toews's rookie year in the NHL, he competed in his second World Championships in 2008. In the finals, Canada was defeated by Russia 4–5 in overtime, winning the silver medal.

On December 30, 2009, Toews was selected to play for Canada at the 2010 Winter Olympics in Vancouver, British Columbia. He was named to the squad along with Blackhawks teammates Brent Seabrook and Duncan Keith. He ended the tournament with a team-leading eight points, while his seven assists tied with Pavol Demitra of Slovakia for the tournament lead. Toews's lone goal of the tournament opened the scoring in Canada's 3–2 overtime win in the gold medal game against the United States. As a result, he was awarded Best Forward and tournament all-star team honours. At the 2014 Winter Olympics in Sochi, he scored the first goal in the gold medal game against Sweden on the way to Canada's second-straight Olympic gold medal.

== Personal life ==
In January 2007, Toews and former UND teammate T. J. Oshie received alcohol-related citations for being minors in a Grand Forks, North Dakota tavern. Toews and Oshie pleaded guilty to the charges. The two were later placed on probation and ordered to perform community service.

In the spring of 2010, a large mural of Toews visible from the Eisenhower Expressway in Chicago received a degree of notoriety. The mural depicted Toews with an abnormally shaped nose and mouth, posed beside a picture of the Stanley Cup. Toews would end up holding the Cup after winning it later that year. He commented on the mural, stating: "I guess it's from a picture and they must have embellished it a little bit. They're not helping me by any means."

Following the 2010 celebration of Toews bringing the Stanley Cup to his hometown of Winnipeg, the Province of Manitoba announced that it would be naming a northern lake after Toews in honour of his success. The lake is located 150 km (93 mi) north of Flin Flon and is named Toews Lake. The same day, the Dakota Community Centre in St. Vital where Toews first played organized hockey was renamed the Jonathan Toews Community Centre. Additionally, he was given the Keys to the City to honour his achievement and strong work ethic.

Despite their shared last name, Toews is not related to fellow Canadian ice hockey player and Colorado Avalanche defenceman Devon Toews.

== Career statistics ==
=== Regular season and playoffs ===
Bold indicates led league

			Regular season					Playoffs
Season	Team	League	GP	G	A	Pts	PIM	GP	G	A	Pts	PIM
2002–03	Winnipeg Warriors	Bantam AAA	48	98	95	193	—	—	—	—	—	—
2003–04	Shattuck–Saint Mary's	Midget AAA	70	64	54	118	—	—	—	—	—	—
2004–05	Shattuck–Saint Mary's	Midget AAA	64	48	62	110	38	—	—	—	—	—
2005–06	University of North Dakota	WCHA	42	22	17	39	22	—	—	—	—	—
2006–07	University of North Dakota	WCHA	34	18	28	46	22	—	—	—	—	—
2007–08	Chicago Blackhawks	NHL	64	24	30	54	44	—	—	—	—	—
2008–09	Chicago Blackhawks	NHL	82	34	35	69	51	17	7	6	13	26
2009–10	Chicago Blackhawks	NHL	76	25	43	68	47	22	7	**22**	29	4
2010–11	Chicago Blackhawks	NHL	80	32	44	76	26	7	1	3	4	2
2011–12	Chicago Blackhawks	NHL	59	29	28	57	28	6	2	2	4	6
2012–13	Chicago Blackhawks	NHL	47	23	25	48	27	23	3	11	14	18
2013–14	Chicago Blackhawks	NHL	76	28	40	68	34	19	9	8	17	8
2014–15	Chicago Blackhawks	NHL	81	28	38	66	36	23	10	11	21	8
2015–16	Chicago Blackhawks	NHL	80	28	30	58	62	7	0	6	6	10
2016–17	Chicago Blackhawks	NHL	72	21	37	58	35	4	1	1	2	0
2017–18	Chicago Blackhawks	NHL	74	20	32	52	47	—	—	—	—	—
2018–19	Chicago Blackhawks	NHL	82	35	46	81	40	—	—	—	—	—
2019–20	Chicago Blackhawks	NHL	70	18	42	60	48	9	5	4	9	2
2021–22	Chicago Blackhawks	NHL	71	12	25	37	39	—	—	—	—	—
2022–23	Chicago Blackhawks	NHL	53	15	16	31	43	—	—	—	—	—
2025–26	Winnipeg Jets	NHL	82	11	18	29	38	—	—	—	—	—
NHL totals			1,149	383	529	912	645	137	45	74	119	84

=== International ===
Year	Team	Event	Result	GP	G	A	Pts	PIM
2005	Canada West	U17	1st place, gold medalist(s)	6	8	4	12	2
2005	Canada	U18	1st place, gold medalist(s)	5	5	3	8	0
2006	Canada	WJC	1st place, gold medalist(s)	6	0	2	2	2
2007	Canada	WJC	1st place, gold medalist(s)	6	4	3	7	12
2007	Canada	WC	1st place, gold medalist(s)	9	2	5	7	6
2008	Canada	WC	2nd place, silver medalist(s)	9	2	3	5	8
2010	Canada	OG	1st place, gold medalist(s)	7	1	7	8	2
2014	Canada	OG	1st place, gold medalist(s)	6	1	2	3	0
2016	Canada	WCH	1st place, gold medalist(s)	6	3	2	5	0
Junior totals				23	17	12	29	16
Senior totals				37	9	19	28	16

== Awards, honours, and records ==
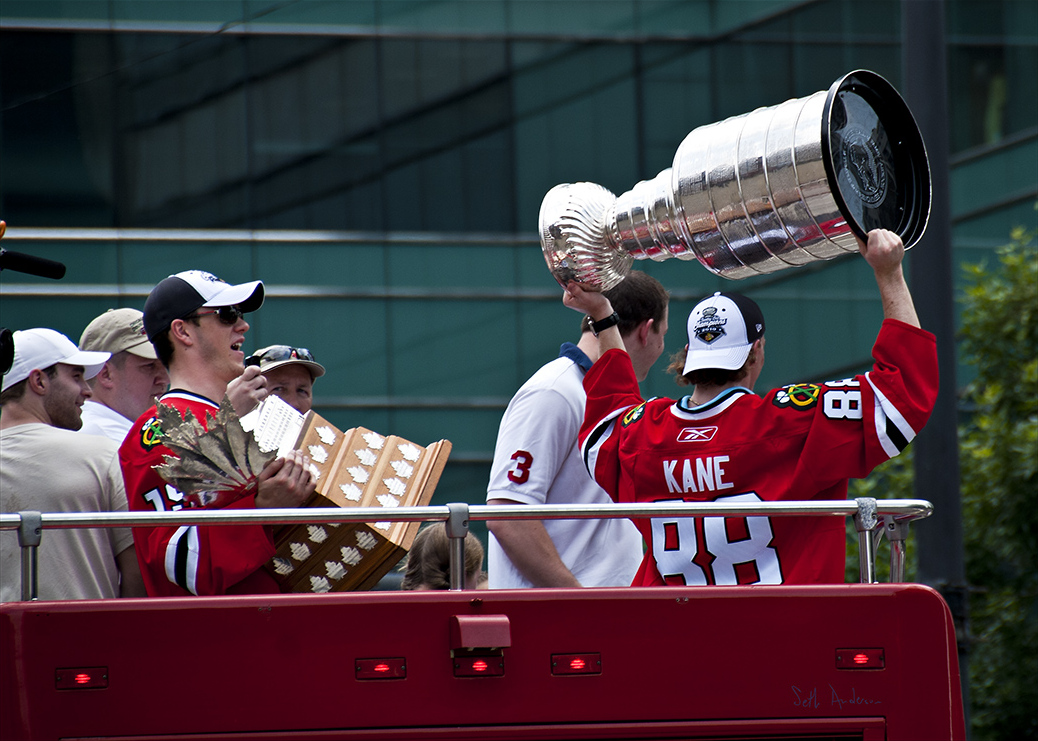
Toews holds onto the Conn Smythe Trophy, awarded to him after the Stanley Cup Finals; as his teammate, Patrick Kane, hoists the Stanley Cup during the 2010 Stanley Cup victory parade

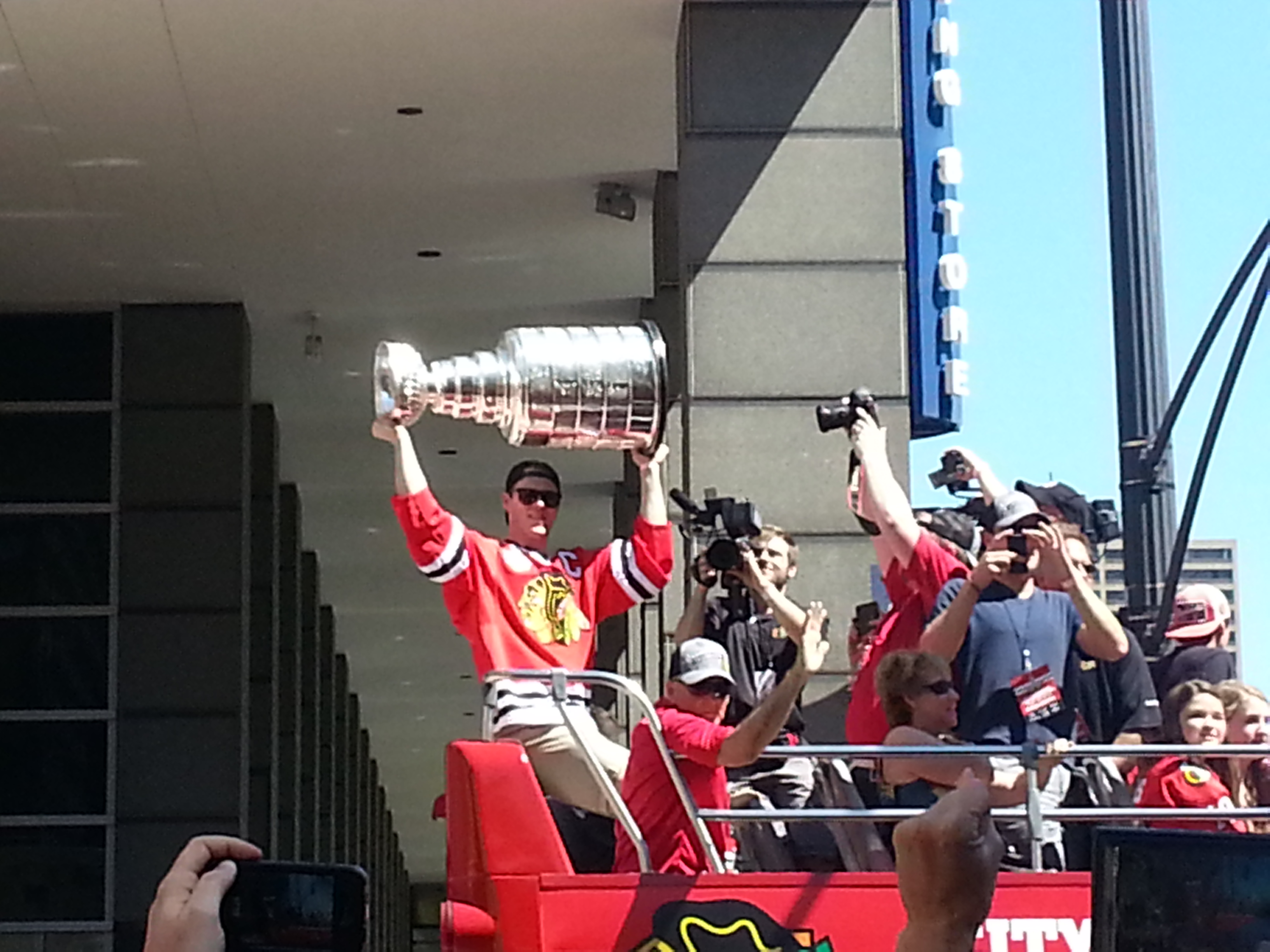
Toews hoists the Stanley Cup during the 2013 Stanley Cup victory parade

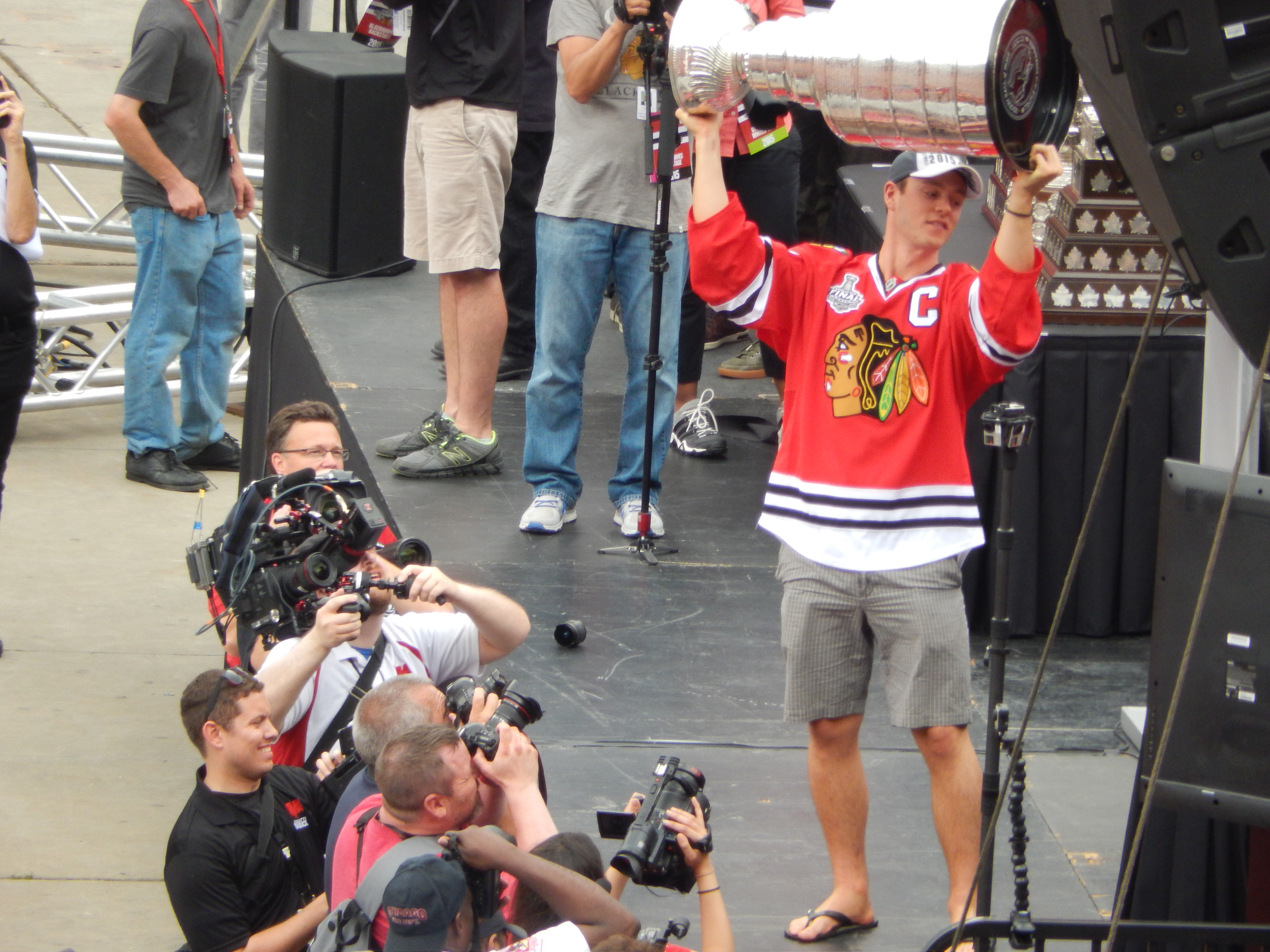
Toews hoists the Stanley Cup during the 2015 Stanley Cup victory rally

Award	Year	Ref
College
All-WCHA Second Team	2006–07	
AHCA West First-Team All-American	2006–07	
WCHA All-Tournament Team	2007	
NCAA West Regional MVP	2006	
NHL
NHL All-Rookie Team	2008	
Stanley Cup champion	2010, 2013, 2015	
Conn Smythe Trophy	2010	
Frank J. Selke Trophy	2013	
Mark Messier Leadership Award	2015	
NHL All-Star Game	2009, 2011, 2012, 2015, 2016, 2017	
NHL Second All-Star Team	2013	
EA Sports NHL cover athlete	2011, 2016	
ESPY Award, NHL Player of the Year	2015	
100 Greatest NHL Players	2017	
International
World U-17 Hockey Challenge MVP	2005	
World Junior All-Star Team	2007	
Winter Olympics All-Star Team	2010	
Winter Olympics Best Forward	2010	
Triple Gold Club	2010	

=== Civilian honours ===
Ribbon	Description	Post-nominal letters	Notes
	Order of Manitoba	OM	

=== Records ===
==== NHL ====
- Fastest appointed captaincy (64 games)
- Youngest captain to win the Conn Smythe Trophy (22 years, 41 days)

==== Chicago Blackhawks ====
- Most career overtime goals (16)
- Most career shootout goals (52)
- Most shootout goals in a season (8, in 2009–10)
- Most assists in a playoff year (22, in 2009–10)
- Most points in a playoff year (29, in 2009–10, tied with Denis Savard)
- Most overtime goals in a season (5, in 2015–16)

==== International ====
- Youngest person to gain entry into the Triple Gold Club (22 years, 41 days)

Awards and achievements
Preceded by Jack Skille	Chicago Blackhawks first-round draft pick 2006	Succeeded by Patrick Kane
Preceded by Evgeni Malkin	Conn Smythe Trophy; 2010	Succeeded by Tim Thomas
Preceded by Patrice Bergeron	Frank J. Selke Trophy; 2013	Succeeded by Patrice Bergeron
Sporting positions
Preceded by Adrian Aucoin	Chicago Blackhawks captain 2008–2023	Succeeded by Nick Foligno
