= Toews Lake =

Lake in Manitoba, Canada

- Location of the lake in Manitoba Toews Lake (Canada)
- Location: Manitoba
- Coordinates: 55.5652°N 101.7704°W
- Etymology: Jonathan Toews
- Max. length: 2.4 km (1.5 mi)
- Max. width: 1.6 km (1.0 mi)
- Settlements: None

Toews Lake is a lake approximately 95 kilometres (59 mi) north of Flin Flon, Manitoba. It is located near the provincial border of Manitoba and Saskatchewan.

The lake is approximately 2.4 kilometres (1.5 mi) long and 1.6 kilometres (1.0 mi) wide. It was named after ice hockey player and Winnipeg native Jonathan Toews in 2010 following his successes in the 2009-10 NHL season and in the 2010 Winter Olympics, where he helped win a gold medal for Canada, the Stanley Cup for the Chicago Blackhawks, and received the Conn Smythe Trophy as the most valuable player in the 2010 Stanley Cup Playoffs.

Greg Selinger, Premier of Manitoba, presented Toews with a certificate regarding the newly named lake and the hockey star's name, remarking, "We thought we'd name a lake after him, 'cause Manitoba has 100,000 lakes".

== See also ==
- List of lakes of Manitoba
