= The Reminder (Flin Flon) =

Canadian newspaper in Manitoba

- Type: Weekly newspaper
- Owner: Glacier Media
- Publisher: Nancy Johnson
- Editor: Eric Westhaver
- Founded: 1946
- Language: English
- Headquarters: 14 North Ave, Flin Flon, Manitoba, R8A0T2
- Circulation: 4137 (total for 3 editions)
- Website: www.thereminder.ca

The Reminder (formerly The Flin Flon Daily Reminder and The Daily Reminder) is a weekly newspaper published every Wednesday in Flin Flon, Canada, a city located on the border of Manitoba and Saskatchewan. It is the only locally published newspaper in the area (which includes adjacent Creighton, Saskatchewan, Denare Beach, Saskatchewan and Cranberry Portage, Manitoba).

== History ==
The Reminder was founded as The Flin Flon Daily Reminder on October 16, 1946 by Tom Dobson, an employee of Flin Flon's largest employer, Hudson Bay Mining and Smelting. The first few issues of the Daily Reminder were stapled together at the top corner and handed out to workers coming off shift at the main gate. Originally publishing six days a week, The Reminder competed directly with the community's original newspaper, The Flin Flon Daily Miner, which ended its run in 1966 after a fire struck its headquarters.

Dobson sold The Reminder in 1989. By then the publication schedule had been cut back to five days a week, Monday to Friday. In 2005, The Reminder became a tri-weekly newspaper with editions every Monday, Wednesday and Friday. It also adopted a larger page format. Within several months, the publication introduced an editorial page that included regular commentary on local affairs. The paper's reduction to a tri-weekly trimmed the number of daily newspapers in the Canadian Prairie provinces from 18 to 17.

The Reminder was later reduced to two editions per week, publishing on Wednesdays and Fridays. The Friday print edition was eliminated in early 2017. The newspaper now publishes an edition every Wednesday, with a website that is updated daily.

== See also ==
- List of newspapers in Canada
