= Eva Mudocci =

English violinist and Edvard Munch's friend (1872–1953)

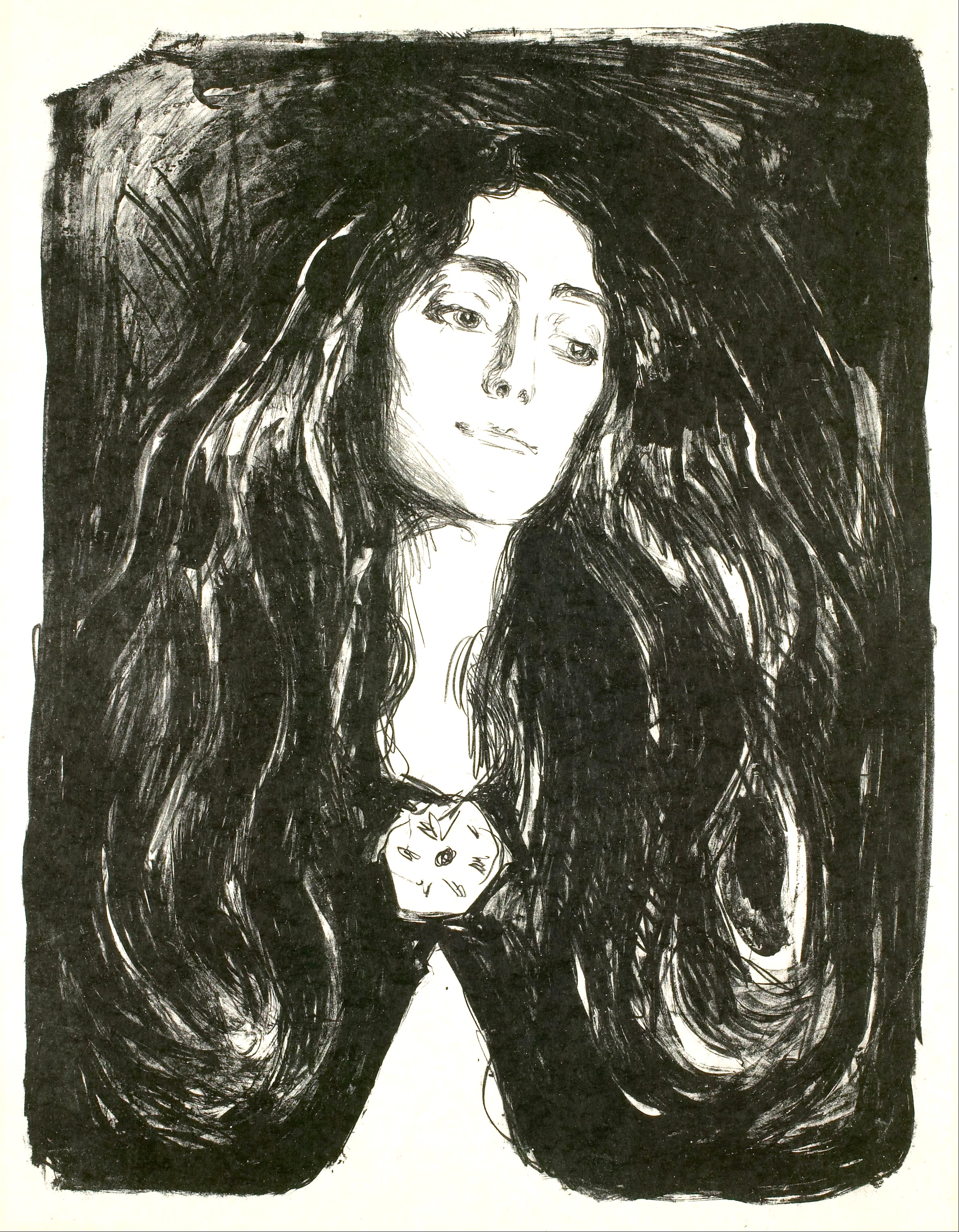
- Edvard Munch, The Brooch/Eva Mudocci, lithograph, 1903
- Born: Evangeline Hope Muddock; 1872
- Died: 1953 (aged 80–81)
- Occupation: Violinist
- Partner(s): Bella Edwards, Edvard Munch
- Children: Two
- Parent(s): J. E. Preston Muddock; Lucy Mary Hann
- Relatives: Dorothy Greenhough-Smith (sister)

Eva Mudocci (1872–1953), born Evangeline Hope Muddock, was an English violinist, who toured Europe with the pianist Bella Edwards. She was the friend and probably lover of the artist Edvard Munch.

== Early life ==
She was born Evangeline Hope Muddock in 1872 in Brixton, London, the daughter of the British journalist and author J. E. Preston Muddock and his wife, Lucy Mary Hann, a violinist.

== Career ==
Mudocci first played the violin in public at the age of nine, as Miss Rose Lynton, which was how she was known for the first decade of her career. As a child, she performed both regionally and nationally within England. Her formal debut was at Prince's Hall on 23 May 1891 in a production that alternated between violin solos, songs, and a quartet by the composer Louis Spohr. Mudocci later met the pianist Bella Edwards, who she later lived with and performed with for five years. She toured Europe with Edwards which brought her critical acclaim.

== Personal life ==
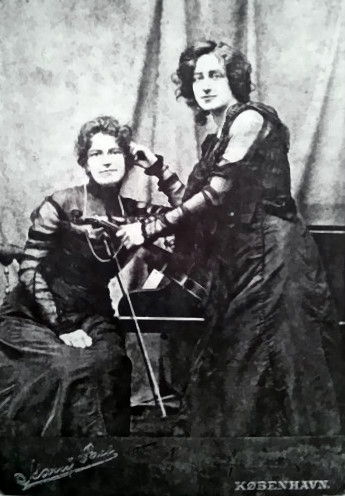
From right to left: Eva Mudocci and Bella Edwards

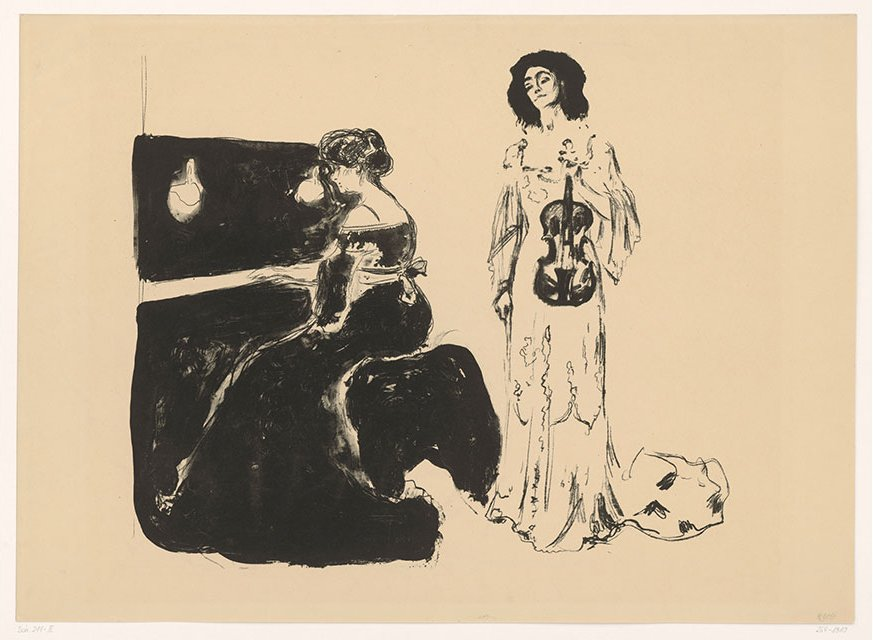
Violin Concert, lithograph by Edvard Munch, 1903.

Mudocci and Edvard Munch met in 1903, when they were introduced in Paris by the composer Frederick Delius, a friend of Munch. It is believed that Mudocci and Munch became lovers, and that this relationship continued until 1908/09, and they remained in contact until 1927. Mudocci and Bella Edwards were also lovers as well as having a professional musical partnership. Munch made three lithographs of Mudocci, one including Edwards. Mudocci was a muse to Henri Matisse, as well as Munch.

In December 1908, Mudocci gave birth to twins, Isobel and Kai, in a private clinic in Nykøbing Falster, Denmark. It has been speculated that Munch, who was believed to have died childless, was the father of the twins, and in 2012, Mudocci's granddaughter, Janet Weber, was willing to undertake DNA testing to prove this.

== Death and legacy ==
Mudocci died in 1953. An unfinished painting, Portrait of Eva Mudocci, in the collection of the Flaten Art Museum at St. Olaf College, Minnesota, in the United States, is generally agreed to be of Mudocci, and probably painted in about 1904–05, but opinion is divided on whether or not it is by Munch. In 1959, the painting was sold by the estate of the Danish illustrator Kay Nielsen, a close family friend of Mudocci.

In 1984, Andy Warhol created an acrylic and silkscreen ink on canvas artwork, Eva Mudocci (after Munch).
