= Birk Sproxton =

Canadian poet and novelist

Birk Sproxton (August 12, 1943 – March 14, 2007) was a Canadian poet and novelist who lived in Red Deer, Alberta.

Born in Flin Flon, Manitoba, Sproxton studied in Winnipeg at the University of Manitoba before moving west to Alberta. He taught creative writing at Red Deer College for over three decades, while working on his own projects.

Sproxton was a prolific writer and editor. One of his later works, Phantom Lake, North of 54 (University of Alberta Press, 2005) won both the Margaret McWilliams Local History Award as well as Grant MacEwan Alberta Author Award. His edited volumes include: Sounds Assembling: The Poetry of Bertram Brooker (Turnstone Press, 1980); Trace: Prairie Writers on Writing (Turnstone Press, 1986); and Great Stories from the Prairies (Red Deer Press, 2003) and The Winnipeg Connection: Writing Lives at Mid-Century (Prairie Fire Press, 2006) in the year before his death.

His archival records are held at the University of Manitoba Archives & Special Collections.

== Selected bibliography ==
- Headframe (1985), ISBN 0-88801-099-0
- The Hockey Fan Came Riding (1990), ISBN 0-88995-056-3
- The Red-Headed Woman with the Black Black Heart (1997), ISBN 0-88801-216-0
- Headframe: 2 (2006), ISBN 0-88801-317-5

== Photographs ==
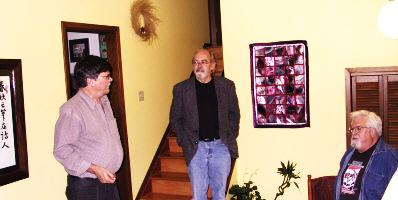
Cooley, Lent, Sproxton, Winnipeg, 2004
