= Marshall Lawrence =

Canadian musician (born 1956)

- Born: 1956 (age 68–69); Flin Flon, Manitoba
- Origin: Windsor, Ontario, Canada
- Genres: Blues, rock
- Instrument: Steel-string acoustic guitar
- Website: www.doctorblues.com

Marshall Lawrence (born 1956) is a Canadian musician. Lawrence is often referred to as the "Doctor of the Blues", as he also works as a psychologist.

== Early years ==
Lawrence was born in Flin Flon, Manitoba. After the age of 10 he moved to and grew up in Windsor, Ontario. At the same time he became interested in rock and roll and asked his father for a guitar. Lawrence enjoyed his Echo semi-acoustic guitar and inspired by Jimi Hendrix was determined to learn how to play it.

== Career ==
Lawrence played his first gig in 1969 in Windsor, Ontario, with a band named The Peanut Gallery, playing a 1969 Gibson SG through a Fender Dual Showman. He blew an amp playing "Johnny B. Goode." As a teen, he spent most of the 1970s and 80s exploring guitar rock styles, while being employed at a car factory in Windsor. Later on in his life, Lawrence moved east to Kingston to pursue a Ph.D in psychology.

Lawrence followed the techniques of his famous idols, the 1970s all-star power guitarists, Chuck Berry and Johnny Winter by buying their albums. He then found himself coming home to the blues of B.B. King. Next, Lawrence discovered Eddie Hazel from Funkadelic, a Jimi-inspired guitarist whose style at that time was considered popular who blended funky James Brown. Lawrence began to play 1970s funk, groove and reggae with the groups Masala and Shock Walter. Simultaneously, Lawrence began experimenting with MIDI technology, by playing Tower of Power-style horn lines, a solo flute and digital FX on his Roland-equipped Strat.

By 1996, Lawrence started to feel that he had matured well enough in blues music so he returned singing blues with the Marshall Lawrence Band. His work took him to Northern California where he could'n find any blues scenes to play, mostly because of his not being familiar with the area. Without any blues music there for him, he purchased and learned how to play the mandolin. He then joined a local bluegrass band, playing mandolin, by the name of the Tubtones. According to Lawrence, this taught him a great deal about rhythm and contributed to his current sound.

== Return to Canada ==
Lawrence returned to Canada in 1997 and having heard of an active and talented blues community in Edmonton, Alberta, he moved there. In less than two weeks after relocating, he formed a R&B group. named it Rhythm Chil'un, and secured a house gig at Brandi's Blues Bar.

== Awards ==
- Inducted into the Blues of Hall of Fame as a Great Blues Artist from Canada
- Received the Blues Underground Network Ambassador Of The Blues Award 2010
- Maple Blues Award Nominee – New Artist/Group Of The Year
- Canadian Independent Music Award Nominee – Favourite Blues Artist Group or Duo of the Year
- Toronto Exclusive Magazine Award Winner – Best Provincial Male Blues Artist
- Toronto Blues Society "Blues Summit IV" Selected Showcase Artist
- Toronto Exclusive Magazine Award Nominee – Best Provincial Blues CD Album "The Morning After"
- Toronto Exclusive Magazine Award Nominee – Provincial Artist of the Year
