= Thomas Creighton (prospector) =

Thomas Creighton was a prospector who found mineral deposits in Saskatchewan.

With his partners Jack and Dan Mosher, Creighton discovered gold on the west side of Amisk Lake in 1913. This was the first significant mineral in the area, leading to an influx of more than a thousand men and women from all over Canada. By 1914 a row of tents and log cabins, along with two cookhouses capable of feeding two hundred people at a time, developed at a place known as "Beaver City". Soon a freighting business was set up, then barns and boarding houses were also built to look after the many travellers. With the gold rush, the freighting industry, and the fishing industry, the boom town Beaver City seemed sustainable. However, when the First World War broke out, many left or moved to Sturgeon Landing to find work in the Mandy Mine there. Beaver City began to deteriorate, and by 1918 had practically become a ghost town.

One day whilst wandering in the wilderness he came upon a copy of The Sunless City by J. E. Preston Muddock. The story is about a man named Josiah Flintabbatey Flonatin "Flin Flon", who piloted a submarine through a bottomless lake. Upon passing through a hole lined with gold, he found a strange underground world. When Tom Creighton discovered a rich vein of almost pure copper, he thought of the book and called it Flin Flon.

The town of Creighton was founded in the 1930s, when some twenty homes were built on either side of the winter trail between Flin Flon and Sandy Bay (Denare). The community grew somewhat after the Saskatchewan Department of Natural Resources constructed a road from Flin Flon to Amisk Lake.

A commemorative cairn to Thomas Creighton is located on Main Street near Creighton School. In 1978, the National Film Board of Canada produced the short documentary Canada Vignettes: Flin Flon about the origin of the city's name.
