= The Sunless City =

1905 novel by J. E. Preston Muddock

- First edition
- Author: J. E. Preston Muddock
- Genre: Science-fiction
- Publisher: F. V. White & Co. Ltd.
- Publication date: 1905
- Media type: Paperback
- Pages: 264
- ISBN: 1-4099-7205-4

The Sunless City: From the Papers and Diaries of the Late Josiah Flintabbatey Flonatin (or simply The Sunless City) is a dime novel written by J. E. Preston Muddock in 1905. The novel is about a prospector named Josiah Flintabbatey Flonatin who explores a bottomless lake in a submarine, and discovers a land where the norms of society are backwards. The title character is the namesake for the city of Flin Flon, Manitoba, Canada.

== Plot ==
The story centres on the lead character, a prospector named Professor Josiah Flintabbatey Flonatin. Flonatin travels by submarine through a bottomless lake in the Rocky Mountains. While exploring the lake's depths, he discovers a strange city. In this city, the currency is tin, the streets are paved with gold, and women rule. Flonatin, a bachelor, escapes by climbing out of a crater, which is an extinct volcano.

== Flin Flon, Manitoba ==
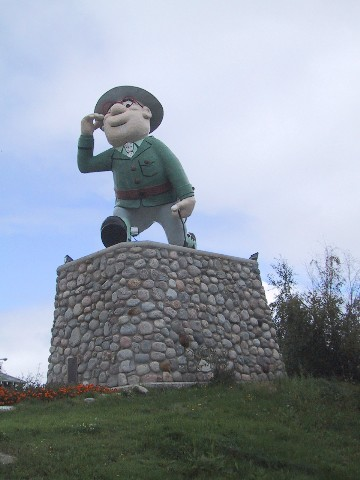
The statue of Josiah Flintabbatey Flonatin in Flin Flon, Manitoba. Designed by Al Capp.

The Sunless City had been read by Thomas Creighton, a prospector who had been exploring in the area of what would become the town of Flin Flon. In 1915 Creighton and some fellow prospectors discovered mineralization, and Creighton named the discovery "Flin Flon". There are various accounts as to how the discovery (which would become the namesake of the city) was named. In one account an associate of Creighton had brought some gold out of a hole from one of their claims, according to this account Creighton said:

That must be the hole where old Flin Flon came up and shook his whiskers, so what do you say we call the discovery Flin Flon?

A second account of the naming of the discovery suggests that the back pages of the book were missing (stopping at the point in the novel where Flonatin is climbing out of the crater), following Creighton's reading of the book, he approaches a deep hole, approximately 10 feet (3.0 m) wide, and said to his associates:

Boys, I guess we've found old Flin Flon's mine.

In 1962, a statue designed by Al Capp of Josiah Flintabbatey Flonatin was built in Flin Flon. In 1978, the National Film Board of Canada produced the short documentary Canada Vignettes: Flin Flon about the origin of the city's name.
