= Flin Flon Museum =

Museum in Manitoba, Canada

Flin Flon Station Museum
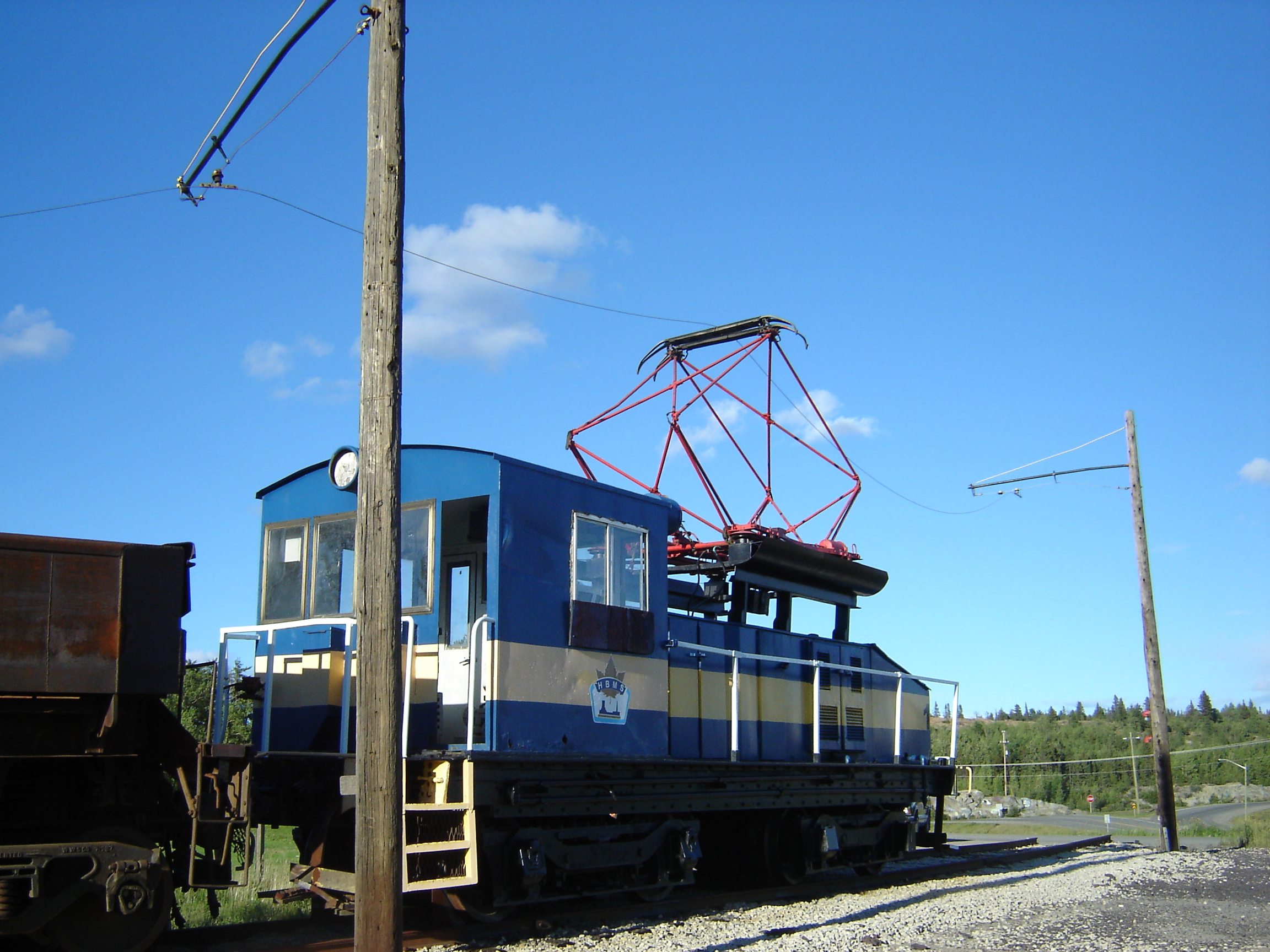
- Preserved GE electric locomotive at the museum, once used at the local mine
- Location: Highway 10A, Flin Flon, Manitoba
- Coordinates: 54°46′14″N 101°50′24″W
- Type: History museum
- Owner: City of Flin Flon
- Website: cityofflinflon.ca/t/tourism/flin-flon-station-museum
- Building details

General information
- Status: used as a museum
- Type: former CNR rail station
- Completed: 1934
- Closed: before 1983

The Flin Flon Station Museum is a community museum in downtown Flin Flon, Manitoba.

The museum has been at its current location since 1983, a former Canadian National Railway station which was opened in 1936. It has been designated as Municipal Heritage Site (Number 383) since May 14, 2014.

Its collections includes artifacts related to mining, transportation, and early pioneers of the area, as well as other artifacts related to the Flin Flon area.

== History ==
The Flin Flon Station was located at milepost 87.5, the end of the rail line from The Pas to Flin Flon, along the Canadian National Railway (CNR) Flin Flon subdivision. The town also has a grain elevator at the station.

== Building description ==
The storey-and-a-half structure is an example of a 2nd Class CNR Station, which were built in communities of notable size.

Like other stations of this type, the building features paired tall sash windows, broad cross-gabled hipped roof with deep bellcast eaves supported by decorative brackets, and ornamental half-timbering in the gable front over the office.

The station is a long rectangle shape, "covered by a low-pitched hipped shingled roof, with a gable-roofed crossing wing terminating at the front in a shallow bay with windows on three sides." There is a short rectangular wing to the rear, with the former passenger area to the right and the former baggage and freight handling area to the left of this area.

The Canadian Register of Historic Places notes the following features and ornamentation at the station:

the light-painted stucco cladding, the organization of the fenestration: large window openings containing paired tall sash windows divided horizontally into three: a square pane at the top with a larger oblong pane in the middle and small sliding ventilating panes at the bottom, the main passenger doorway at centre right, with freight doors to the left, the contrasting-coloured ornamental half, timbering in the gable front, the deep eaves, supported by large, decorative wooden brackets.
