= J. E. Preston Muddock =

British writer (1843–1934)

James Edward Preston Muddock, also known as Joyce Emmerson Preston Muddock and Dick Donovan (28 May 1843 – 23 January 1934), was a prolific British journalist and author of mystery and horror fiction. For a time his detective stories were as popular as those of Arthur Conan Doyle. Between 1889 and 1922 he published nearly 300 detective and mystery stories.

== Life ==
Muddock was the third of four children, born near Southampton, England, to sea captain James Muddock and Elizabeth Preston. At 14 he travelled to India. During his journalistic career he travelled to China, the United States, and Australia. Muddock's father had made poor investments and was compelled to work overseas, so Muddock rarely saw his father in his early years. By 1870 Muddock had started publishing serial stories in English newspapers.

== Family ==
Muddock was married three times, in 1861, in 1871 and in 1880, with ten children who survived infancy.

One of his daughters was the figure skater Dorothy Greenhough-Smith. Another daughter, Evangeline Hope Muddock (1883–1953), changed her name to Eva Mudocci. She was a violinist and became mistress and friend to Expressionist painter Edvard Munch. One of his grandsons was Charles le Gai Eaton. He had three sons who fell in World War I. Replying to a letter of condolence from a lady (a certain "Collette") on Christmas Eve, 1917 – writing from his home near Putney Common – he also recounted how his last son had fallen just "seven miles from Jerusalem". Despite this most tragic personal loss, Muddock still managed to see his sons as English "gentlemen" whose deaths were part of the great sacrifice the nation was making.

Muddock had few publications after about 1920 and died in 1934, relying on his daughters to support him at the end of his life.

== Works ==
Most of Muddock's stories featured his continuing character Dick Donovan, the Glasgow Detective, named for one of the 18th-century Bow Street Runners. The character was so popular that later stories were published under this pen name. Muddock also wrote true crime stories, horror, and 37 novels, most as "Dick Donovan". His non-fiction included four history books, seven guidebooks for areas in the Alps and his autobiography. His stories were used by The Strand Magazine in months when there were no Sherlock Holmes stories available.

Muddock's detective stories differ from the psychological investigation of character in modern detective fiction, and they are described as having sensational plots but little character development. Atmospheric details of the setting were minimal, perhaps to ensure acceptance in both the UK and the US markets. Deduction and logical thought in the "Donovan" stories are of significantly less importance than in the nearly contemporary Sherlock Holmes stories.

== Flin Flon, Manitoba ==
The town of Flin Flon takes its name from the lead character in a 1905 paperback novel by Muddock:

Josiah Flintabbatey Flonatin, Esq., or, as he was more familiarly known amongst his fellows, “Flin Flon,"was a gentleman conspicuous for two things-- the smallness of his stature and the largeness of his perception. His origin was lost in the mists of antiquity, but he boasted that he was a descendant of the noble Italian family of the Flonatins...

In The Sunless City, Josiah Flintabbatey Flonatin pilots a submarine through a bottomless lake. Upon passing through a hole lined with gold, he finds a strange underground world. A prospector, Thomas Creighton, found the book in the wilderness. When he discovered a rich vein of almost pure copper, by a deep lake, it reminded him of the book. So he called it Flin Flon's mine, shortening the name.
