= Flin Flon =

Town in Manitoba and Saskatchewan, Canada

- City
- City of Flin Flon
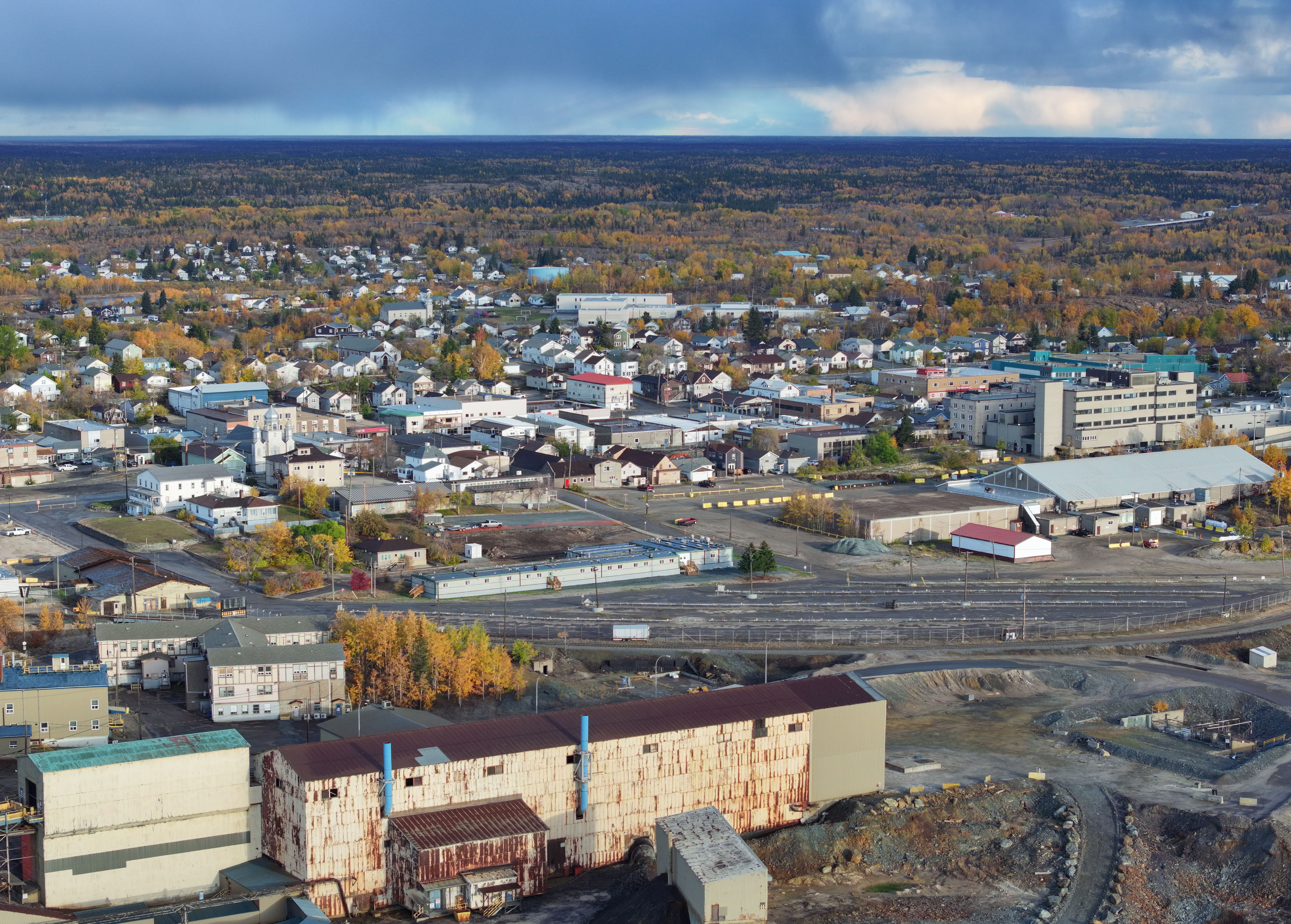
- Downtown

- Flag Logo
- Nickname: The City Built On Rock
- City boundaries

- Location in Canada Location in Manitoba
- Coordinates: 54°46′0″N 101°52′40″W
- Country: Canada
- Provinces: Manitoba and Saskatchewan
- District (Saskatchewan): Northern Saskatchewan Administration District
- Region (Manitoba): Northern Manitoba
- Founded: 1927
- Incorporated: January 1, 1933
- Incorporated As City: June 26, 1970

Government
  - Mayor: Roger Armstrong
  - Council: Flin Flon City Council
  - MP: Rebecca Chartrand (Lib, MB); Buckley Belanger (Lib, SK)
  - MLA: Tom Lindsey (NDP, MB); Jordan McPhail (NDP, SK)

Area
  - Land: 11.55 km^{2} (4.46 sq mi)
- Elevation: 300 m (980 ft)

Population (2021)
  - Total: 5,099
- Time zone: UTC-5 (EST)
- Forward sortation area: R8A
- Area code: 204
- Website: cityofflinflon.ca

Flin Flon (pop. 5,194 in 2016 census; 4,991 in Manitoba and 203 in Saskatchewan) is a mining city, located on a correction line on the border of the Canadian provinces of Manitoba and Saskatchewan, with the majority of the city located within Manitoba. Residents thus travel southwest into Saskatchewan, and northeast into Manitoba. The city is incorporated in, and is jointly administered by both provinces.

== Etymology ==
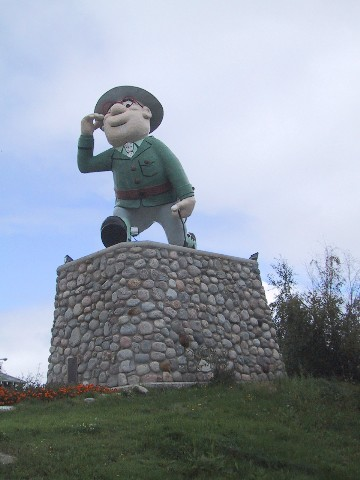
The town is named after the fictional character Josiah Flintabbatey Flonatin.

The town's name is taken from the lead character in a 1905 paperback novel, The Sunless City by British author J. E. Preston Muddock:

Josiah Flintabbatey Flonatin, Esq., or, as he was more familiarly known amongst his fellows, "Flin Flon," was a gentleman conspicuous for two things-- the smallness of his stature and the largeness of his perception. His origin was lost in the mists of antiquity, but he boasted that he was a descendant of the noble Italian family of the Flonatins...

In the novel, Flonatin pilots a submarine into a bottomless lake where he sails through a hole lined with gold to enter a strange underground world. He finds a strange city ruled by women in which the local currency is tin and the streets are paved with gold. He ultimately re-emerges via a deep crater.

A copy of Muddock's 1905 book was allegedly found and read by prospector Tom Creighton. When Creighton discovered a high-grade exposure of copper, he thought of the book and referred to it as "Flin Flon's hole". The town that developed around the mine then adopted the name. Flin Flon shares the distinction of being named after a character in an adventure novel with Tarzana, California, and Le Plessis-Robinson, France.

The character of "Flinty", as he is locally known, is of such importance to the identity of the city that in 2003, the local Chamber of Commerce commissioned the minting of a $3.00 coin which was considered legal tender amongst locally participating retailers until September 2004 and a $5.00 coin which was in circulation until December 31, 2008. A statue representing Flinty was designed by cartoonist Al Capp and is one of the points of interest of the city. In 1978, the National Film Board of Canada produced the short documentary Canada Vignettes: Flin Flon about the origin of the city's name.

== History ==
Flin Flon was founded in 1927 by Hudbay (at that time called Hudson Bay Mining and Smelting Co.) to exploit the large local copper and zinc ore resources. In the late 1920s, HBM&S invested in a railway, mine, smelter, and a hydroelectric power plant at Island Falls, Saskatchewan. By 1928, the rail line reached the mine.

The town grew considerably during the 1930s as those impoverished by the Great Depression came to work at the mines. A significant number of farmers abandoned their farms and were among those looking for work. The municipality was incorporated on January 1, 1933, and reached city status in 1970. The city continued to be a mining centre with the development of several mines adding to its industrial base, although its population has been in decline since the 1960s. The last Flin Flon area mine, 777, was closed and decommissioned in 2022 along with the majority of the Hudbay Flin Flon operations, with many workers moving to the Lalor Mine in Snow Lake, MB.

With a scenic setting and a number of nearby lakes, Flin Flon is a popular tourist destination.

In May 2025, Flin Flon was precautionarily evacuated due to the 2025 Canadian wildfires.

== Geography ==
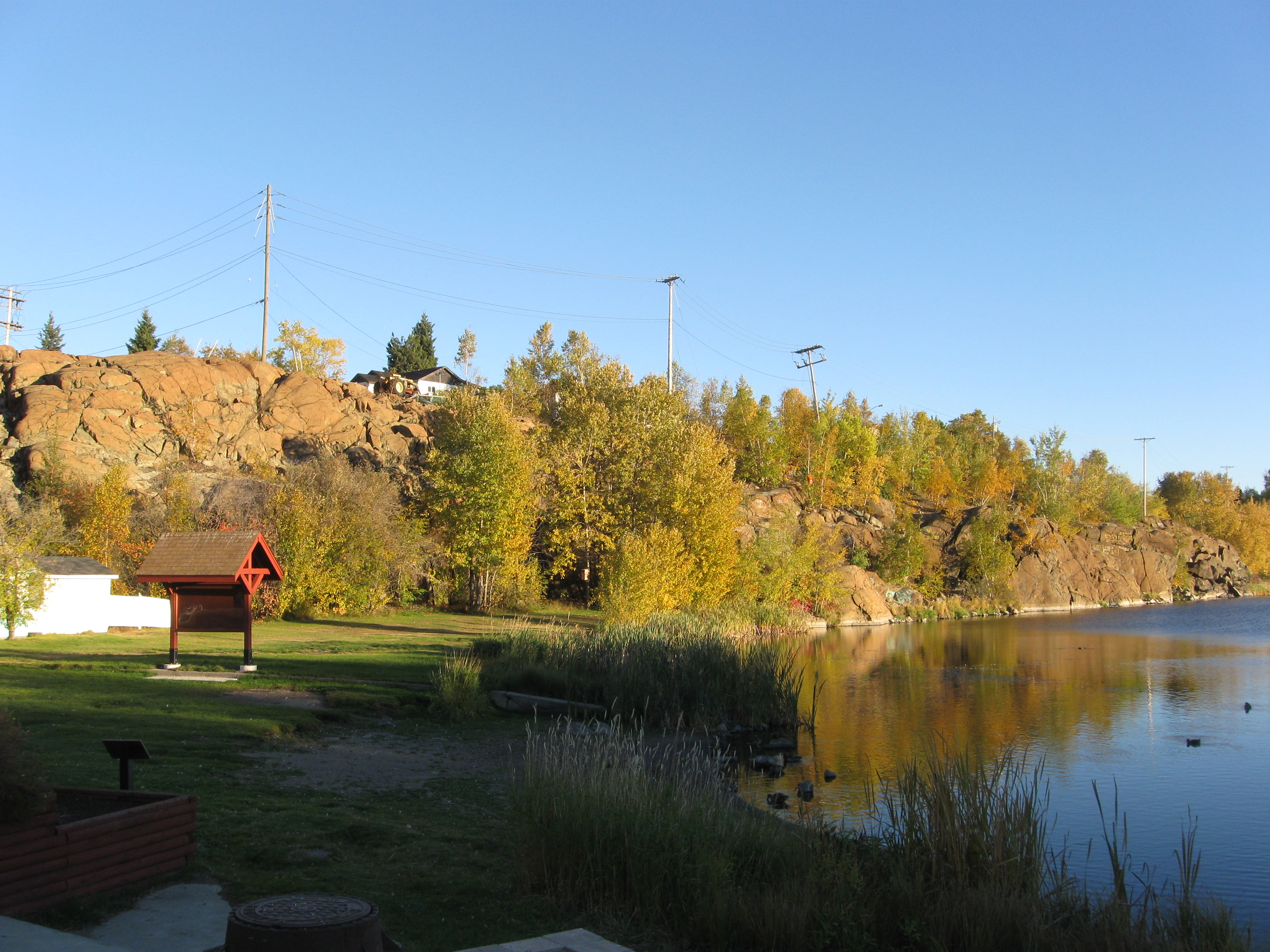
Flin Flon in the fall

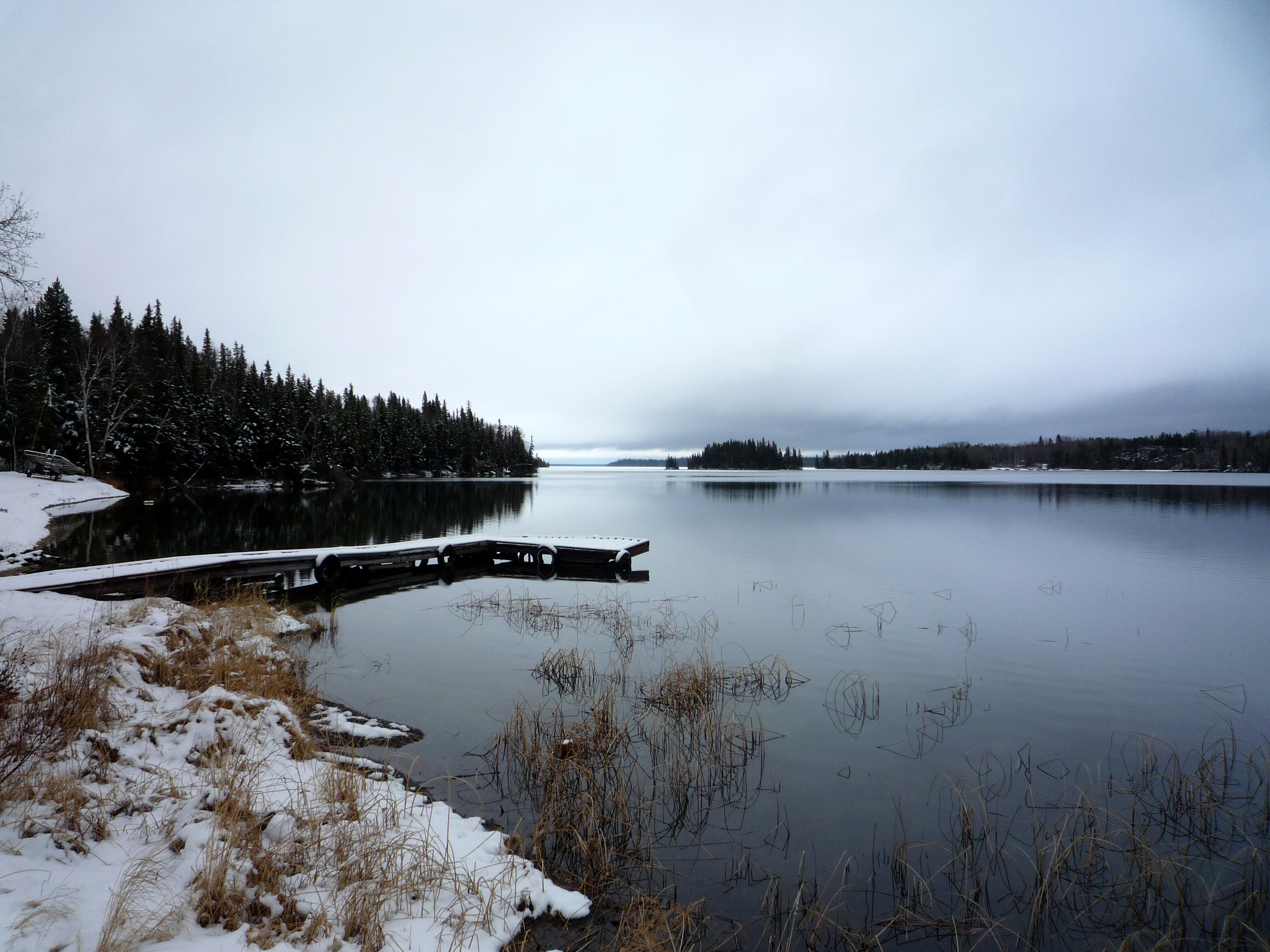
Lake Athapapuskow, near Bakers Narrows Provincial Park and the airport; the photo was taken in late May, demonstrating that snow is possible (though unusual) even that late in the year.

Flin Flon straddles the provincial boundary of Manitoba and Saskatchewan with the majority of the city located in Manitoba. The 2016 census reported 4,982 residents in the Manitoba portion and 203 in the Saskatchewan section; the Manitoba portion has a land area of 13.88 km^{2} (5.36 sq mi), while the Saskatchewan portion has a land area of 2.37 km^{2} (0.92 sq mi). Due to the zig-zag nature of the Saskatchewan-Manitoba boundary correction lines, the Saskatchewan section of town lies south of the Manitoba section, not west. Main Street crosses the provincial boundary just south of its intersection with Church Street; Hudson Street crosses the provincial boundary between its intersections with 5 Ave E. and Harrison Street, adopting the new name South Hudson Street at the point of crossing; an undeveloped stretch of Channing Drive briefly crosses into Saskatchewan before reentering Manitoba just west of the city's rural Channing neighbourhood.

For Canada Post purposes, residents in the Saskatchewan portion of the city retain the local Manitoba R8A postal code, and often use a Flin Flon, MB address. For telephone service, however, they are located in Saskatchewan's area code 306 as part of the Creighton telephone exchange, rather than Manitoba's area code 204. However, residents in Saskatchewan may use either Saskatchewan's SaskTel or Manitoba's Bell MTS systems for cellular services. Electrical service is received from Manitoba Hydro for both the Manitoba and Saskatchewan parts of the city.

The majority of Flin Flon's surface topology is exposed Canadian Shield bedrock, hence the nickname "the city built on rock". Due to this and climatic factors, agriculture is generally not possible; however, grain farming is found 130 kilometres (80 mi) southeast in The Pas, Manitoba, which is south of the Canadian Shield. The extensive bedrock exposure led to some interesting adaptations. In the northwestern areas of the city, there is often not enough overburden to bury water and sewer lines, so "sewer boxes" exist above surface to house the infrastructure. Many of these are used as ad-hoc sidewalks.

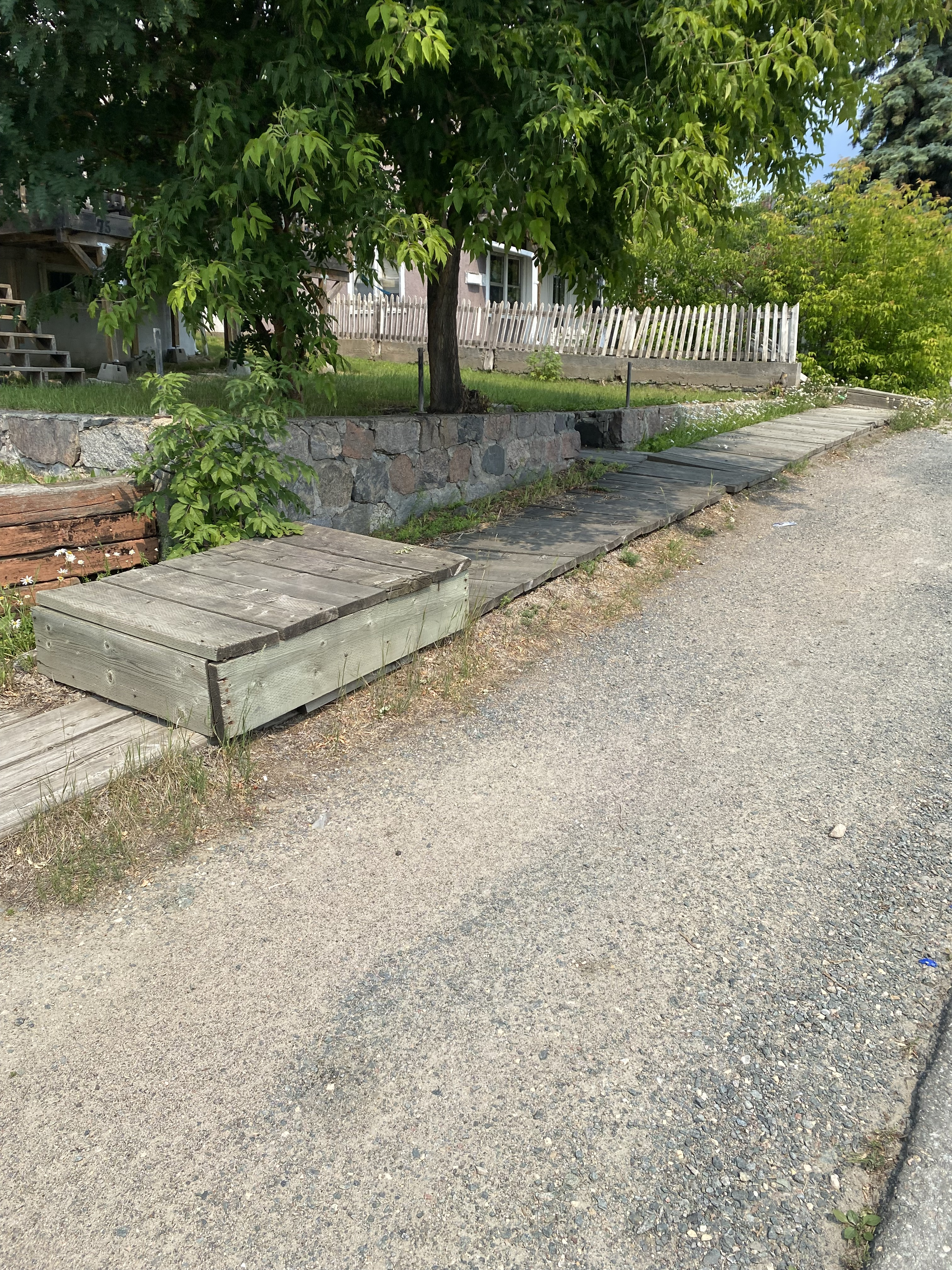
A sewer box in Flin Flon

=== Climate ===
Flin Flon experiences a humid continental climate (Köppen climate classification Dfb), although in recent days, the climate is noticeably hotter. There is a wide range in seasonal temperatures, with warm summers and bitterly cold winters. Temperatures in January have an average low of −22.9 °C (−9.2 °F) and an average high of −14.7 °C (5.5 °F). Temperatures in July have an average high of 24.1 °C (75.4 °F) and an average low of 13.6 °C (56.5 °F). The highest (reliable) (Note: In June and July 1929, a maximum temperature of 98 and 104 °F (36.7 and 40.0 °C) respectively were recorded, however these all-time high monthly values appear to be incorrect when compared to other nearby climate stations such as The Pas and other stations in Manitoba and Saskatchewan.) temperature ever recorded in Flin Flon was 38.3 °C (100.9 °F) on July 19, 1941. The coldest temperature ever recorded was −46.1 °C (−51.0 °F) on January 15, 1930.

Climate data for Flin Flon, 1981–2010 normals, extremes 1927–present
Month	Jan	Feb	Mar	Apr	May	Jun	Jul	Aug	Sep	Oct	Nov	Dec	Year
Record high °C (°F)	9.5 (49.1)	11.7 (53.1)	18.0 (64.4)	29.4 (84.9)	33.5 (92.3)	36.0 (96.8)	38.3 (100.9)	35.6 (96.1)	32.5 (90.5)	25.0 (77.0)	15.5 (59.9)	8.3 (46.9)	38.3 (100.9)
Mean daily maximum °C (°F)	−14.7 (5.5)	−10.2 (13.6)	−2.1 (28.2)	7.3 (45.1)	15.0 (59.0)	21.1 (70.0)	24.1 (75.4)	22.6 (72.7)	15.0 (59.0)	6.3 (43.3)	−5.0 (23.0)	−12.4 (9.7)	5.6 (42.1)
Daily mean °C (°F)	−18.9 (−2.0)	−14.9 (5.2)	−7.6 (18.3)	1.8 (35.2)	9.4 (48.9)	15.8 (60.4)	18.9 (66.0)	17.5 (63.5)	10.8 (51.4)	3.0 (37.4)	−8.0 (17.6)	−16.2 (2.8)	1.0 (33.8)
Mean daily minimum °C (°F)	−22.9 (−9.2)	−19.6 (−3.3)	−13.0 (8.6)	−3.6 (25.5)	3.8 (38.8)	10.4 (50.7)	13.6 (56.5)	12.4 (54.3)	6.5 (43.7)	−0.4 (31.3)	−11.0 (12.2)	−20.0 (−4.0)	−3.6 (25.5)
Record low °C (°F)	−46.1 (−51.0)	−43.3 (−45.9)	−40.0 (−40.0)	−29.4 (−20.9)	−15.0 (5.0)	−2.8 (27.0)	0.0 (32.0)	0.0 (32.0)	−10.0 (14.0)	−21.7 (−7.1)	−34.4 (−29.9)	−43.3 (−45.9)	−46.1 (−51.0)
Average precipitation mm (inches)	17.5 (0.69)	16.7 (0.66)	15.1 (0.59)	20.3 (0.80)	40.9 (1.61)	69.0 (2.72)	77.9 (3.07)	63.7 (2.51)	63.4 (2.50)	29.0 (1.14)	21.7 (0.85)	22.5 (0.89)	457.6 (18.02)
Average rainfall mm (inches)	0.0 (0.0)	0.0 (0.0)	0.2 (0.01)	7.9 (0.31)	39.3 (1.55)	69.3 (2.73)	77.9 (3.07)	63.7 (2.51)	64.2 (2.53)	21.0 (0.83)	1.1 (0.04)	0.0 (0.0)	344.5 (13.56)
Average snowfall cm (inches)	17.5 (6.9)	16.7 (6.6)	15.0 (5.9)	12.4 (4.9)	1.6 (0.6)	0.0 (0.0)	0.0 (0.0)	0.0 (0.0)	0.7 (0.3)	8.1 (3.2)	20.6 (8.1)	22.9 (9.0)	115.5 (45.5)
Average precipitation days (≥ 0.2 mm)	6.6	5.6	4.6	4.6	8.6	9.9	12.2	10.4	10.6	7.4	6.4	6.6	93.5
Average rainy days (≥ 0.2 mm)	0.0	0.0	0.11	2.1	8.4	10.0	12.2	10.4	10.5	5.4	0.36	0.0	59.3
Average snowy days (≥ 0.2 cm)	7.0	5.6	4.6	2.5	0.38	0.04	0.0	0.0	0.20	2.3	6.0	6.7	35.3
Source: Environment Canada

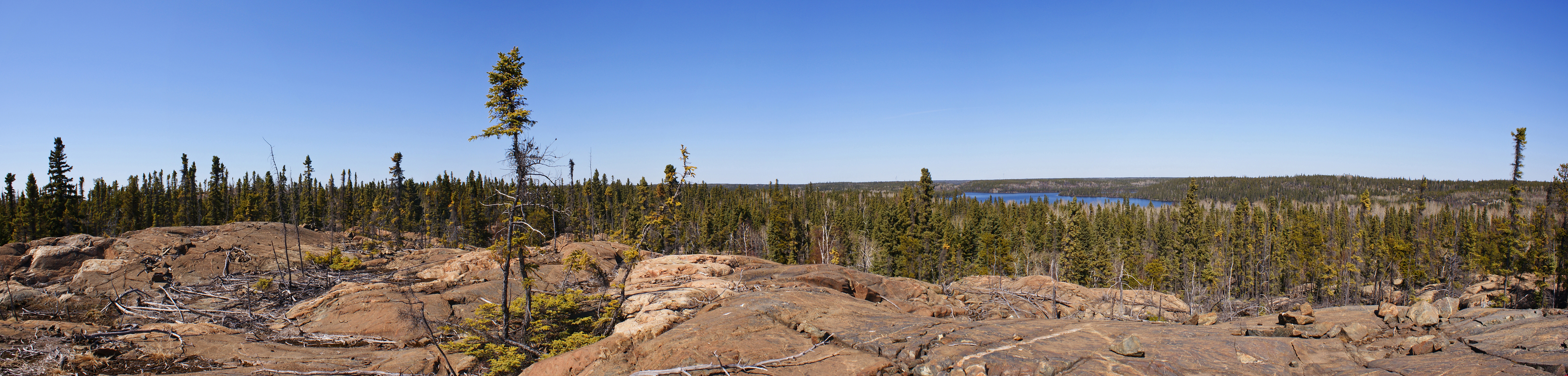
Canadian Shield geography in the Flin Flon region

== Demographics ==
Combined population history of both portions of the City of Flin Flon
Year	Pop.	±%
1931	2,374	—
1941	8,860	+273.2%
1951	9,899	+11.7%
1956	10,771	+8.8%
1961	11,106	+3.1%
1966	10,201	−8.1%
1971	9,344	−8.4%
1976	8,560	−8.4%
1981	8,261	−3.5%
1986	7,591	−8.1%
1991	7,449	−1.9%
1996	6,861	−7.9%
2001	6,267	−8.7%
2006	5,836	−6.9%
2011	5,634	−3.5%
2016	5,194	−7.8%
2021	5,099	−1.8%

Population history of the Saskatchewan portion of the City of Flin Flon
Year	Pop.	±%
1931	—	—
1941	—	—
1951	—	—
1956	537	—
1961	588	+9.5%
1966	527	−10.4%
1971	471	−10.6%
1976	408	−13.4%
1981	367	−10.0%
1986	348	−5.2%
1991	330	−5.2%
1996	289	−12.4%
2001	267	−7.6%
2006	242	−9.4%
2011	229	−5.4%
2016	203	−11.4%
2021	159	−21.7%

Population history of the Manitoba portion of the City of Flin Flon
Year	Pop.	±%
1931	2,374	—
1941	8,860	+273.2%
1951	9,899	+11.7%
1956	10,234	+3.4%
1961	10,548	+3.1%
1966	9,674	−8.3%
1971	8,873	−8.3%
1976	8,152	−8.1%
1981	7,894	−3.2%
1986	7,243	−8.2%
1991	7,119	−1.7%
1996	6,572	−7.7%
2001	6,000	−8.7%
2006	5,594	−6.8%
2011	5,405	−3.4%
2016	4,991	−7.7%
2021	4,940	−1.0%

In the 2021 Census of Population conducted by Statistics Canada, the Manitoba portion of Flin Flon had a population of 4,940 living in 2,280 of its 2,533 total private dwellings, a change of −1% from its 2016 population of 4,991. With a land area of 13.14 km^{2} (5.07 sq mi), it had a population density of 376.0/km^{2} (973.7/sq mi) in 2021.

Also in the 2021 census, the Saskatchewan portion of Flin Flon had a population of 159 living in 73 of its 100 total private dwellings, a change of −21.7% from its 2016 population of 203. With a land area of 2.01 km^{2} (0.78 sq mi), it had a population density of 79.1/km^{2} (204.9/sq mi) in 2021.

Panethnic groups in the City of Flin Flon (2001−2021)
Panethnic group	2021		2016		2011		2006		2001	
Panethnic group	Pop.	%	Pop.	%	Pop.	%	Pop.	%	Pop.	%
European (Note: Statistic includes all persons that did not make up part of a visible minority or an indigenous identity.)	3,540	70.73%	3,845	76.14%	4,405	79.8%	4,745	82.16%	5,370	86.68%
Indigenous	1,110	22.18%	1,065	21.09%	955	17.3%	960	16.62%	760	12.27%
South Asian	155	3.1%	15	0.3%	30	0.54%	15	0.26%	15	0.24%
Southeast Asian (Note: Statistic includes total responses of "Filipino" and "Southeast Asian" under visible minority section on census.)	75	1.5%	65	1.29%	80	1.45%	30	0.52%	25	0.4%
African	45	0.9%	20	0.4%	0	0%	10	0.17%	15	0.24%
Middle Eastern (Note: Statistic includes total responses of "West Asian" and "Arab" under visible minority section on census.)	25	0.5%	0	0%	0	0%	0	0%	10	0.16%
East Asian (Note: Statistic includes total responses of "Chinese", "Korean", and "Japanese" under visible minority section on census.)	20	0.4%	20	0.4%	0	0%	10	0.17%	10	0.16%
Latin American	10	0.2%	20	0.4%	0	0%	0	0%	10	0.16%
Other/multiracial (Note: Statistic includes total responses of "Visible minority, n.i.e." and "Multiple visible minorities" under visible minority section on census.)	10	0.2%	0	0%	0	0%	0	0%	0	0%
Total responses	5,005	98.16%	5,050	97.23%	5,520	97.98%	5,775	98.95%	6,195	98.85%
Total population	5,099	100%	5,194	100%	5,634	100%	5,836	100%	6,267	100%
Note: Totals greater than 100% due to multiple origin responses

== Transportation ==
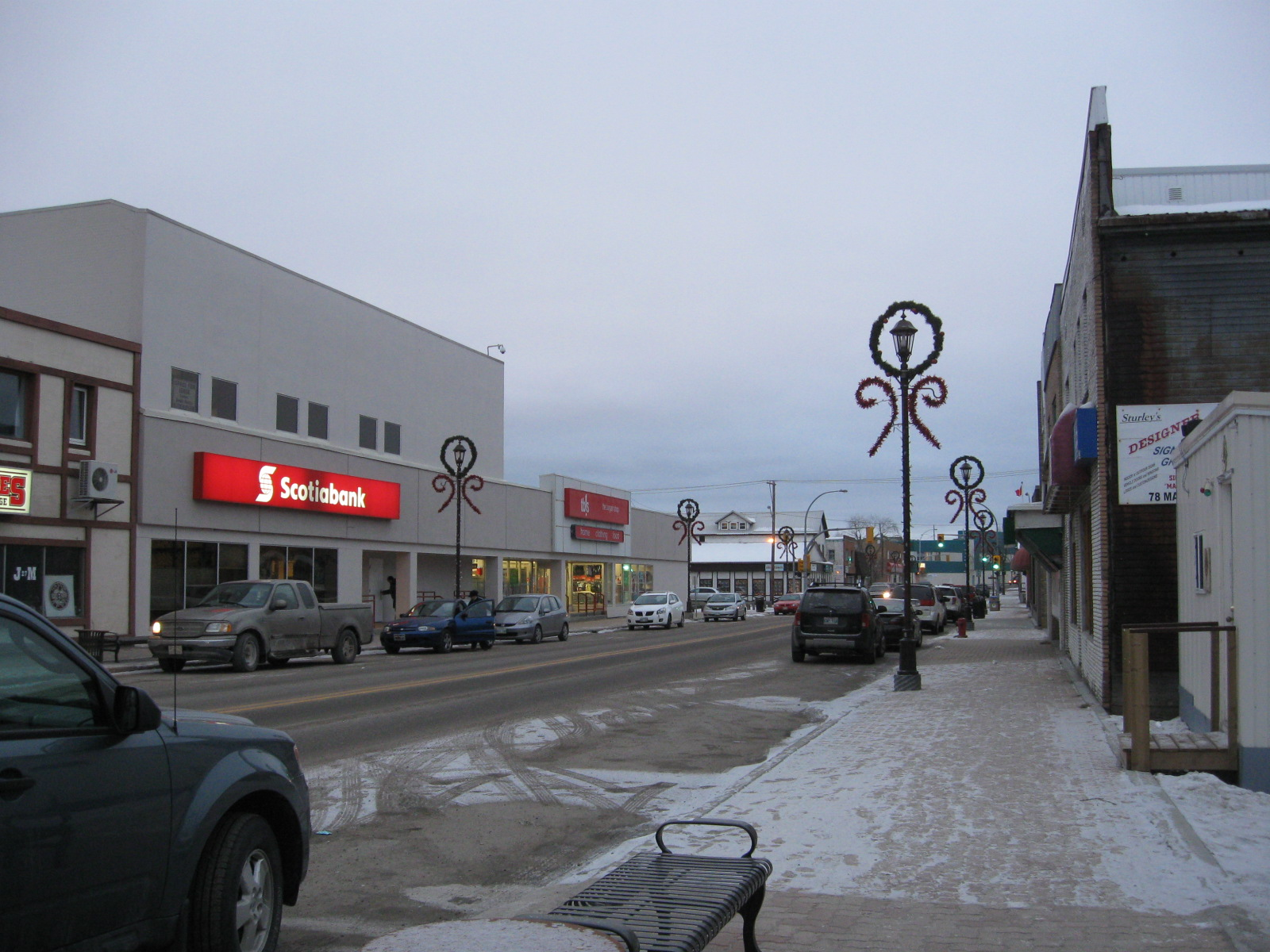
Main Street

=== Road ===
Flin Flon is accessed by Manitoba Provincial Trunk Highway 10, Saskatchewan Highway 106 and Saskatchewan Highway 167. The city also runs a small public bus system.

=== Air ===
The city operates Flin Flon Airport, which is located southeast of the city, immediately west of the Bakers Narrows Provincial Park. The airport has a single asphalt runway, and has regular flights to and from Winnipeg through Calm Air. There is also a gravel airstrip in nearby Channing, MB for small aircraft use with a water aerodrome adjacent to it.

=== Rail ===
The Hudson Bay Railway operates railway freight service on its railway line between The Pas and Flin Flon.

The rail line to Churchill was washed out in June 2017 and remained out of service for over a year when then-owner Omnitrax refused to repair it. The City of Flin Flon purchased shares in One North, one of the partners of purchasing consortium Arctic Gateway Group Limited Partnership. The rail line was subsequently repaired by Cando Rail Services and Paradox Access Solutions.

== Economy ==
=== Main employers ===
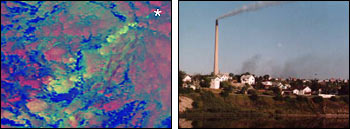
Prior to the smelter closure in June 2010 (seen here with its 251m-high stack), pollution was a major issue as demonstrated by the yellow trail, which was seeded by the aerosols from the copper smelter.

Flin Flon's five largest employer sectors (2016)
Service	Number of employees
Manufacturing	1,541
Retail	702
Healthcare and social assistance	643
Accommodation and food services	290
Mining	238

=== Mining ===
The economy of Flin Flon was primarily reliant on and still remains largely dependent on base metal production (primarily copper and zinc with lesser gold and silver). Since the late 1910s, approximately 17 mines have operated in the Flin Flon vicinity. The most recent mine, the 777 Mine, closed in June 2022 with decommissioning completed shortly thereafter.

Zinc concentrate (from sphalerite) was produced and processed on-site to refined zinc while copper concentrate (from chalcopyrite) was produced and sold for external copper production. Prior to the smelter closure in 2010, the chalcopyrite concentrate was refined on location. Although processing of any sulphide material usually emits large amounts of sulfur dioxide, the Hudbay plant used a zinc pressure leaching (ZPL) process which greatly reduced emissions.

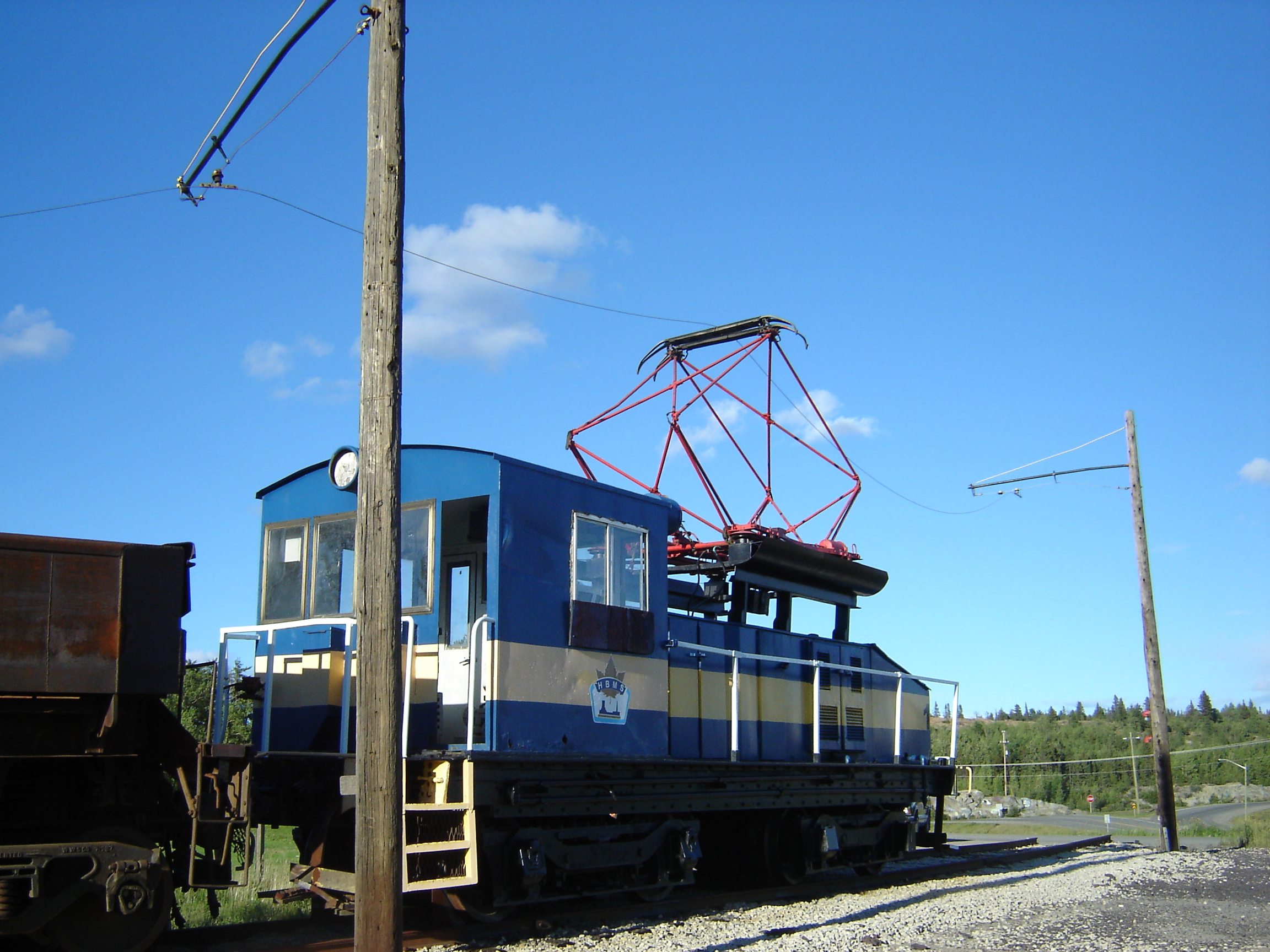
A DC Electric Locomotive, used at the main plant, is on display at the Flin Flon Museum.

=== Marijuana production ===
Flin Flon gained international notoriety in 2002 when the Government of Canada awarded a four-year contract to Saskatoon-based Prairie Plant Systems for the production of medicinal marijuana. The company set up operations in a mined-out area of the then-active Trout Lake Mine, an underground copper/zinc mine located just over 5 km (3.1 mi) northeast of Flin Flon city limits and owned by Hudbay to produce approximately 400 kilograms (880 pounds) of medicinal marijuana annually. The entire operation was situated approximately 120 metres (390 ft) underground for security and climate control reasons.

In 2009, Prairie Plant Systems discontinued operation at the mine due to the expiry of their lease and the uncertainty regarding the pending closure of the mine, which occurred in 2011.

== Culture ==
=== Arts ===
Flin Flon has an active local arts and culture scene. The Flin Flon Arts Council has been instrumental in building the local arts scene, and has also brought high-quality performers, such as the Royal Winnipeg Ballet, into the community for special events. The R.H. Channing Auditorium in the Flin Flon Community Hall hosts concerts and theatrical performances, including those produced by the local theatre troupe "Ham Sandwich".

In 2010, the Northern Visual Arts Centre (or NorVA) was established as a studio and gallery space for local visual artists. NorVA frequently hosts workshops, concerts and other community arts-based events.

Every two years, the Flin Flon Community Choir performs a large musical production for the community. In 2013, the Flin Flon Community Choir presented Chicago: The Musical, to great acclaim. They presented Les Miserables in 2015, Grease in 2017, and Mamma Mia in 2019. Past performances have included Beauty and the Beast, Fiddler on the Roof, and Bombertown, among many others.

Culture Days, a national festival celebrating arts and culture, is a popular event in Flin Flon. Culture Days is held on the last weekend of September each year. In 2018, Flin Flon ranked second in the country, only following Winnipeg, for the number of free events (including concerts, workshops, artist talks and kids' activities) offered to community members and visitors. Toronto followed Flin Flon with the number of events, ranking third, down from second in 2017.

Flin Flon is the fictional home of the comic book superhero Captain Canuck.

=== Petting zoo ===
The city operates the Joe Brain Petting Zoo. It is open from June through August, weather permitting. It features a picnic area, playground, basketball hoops, and a wading pool.

=== Sports ===
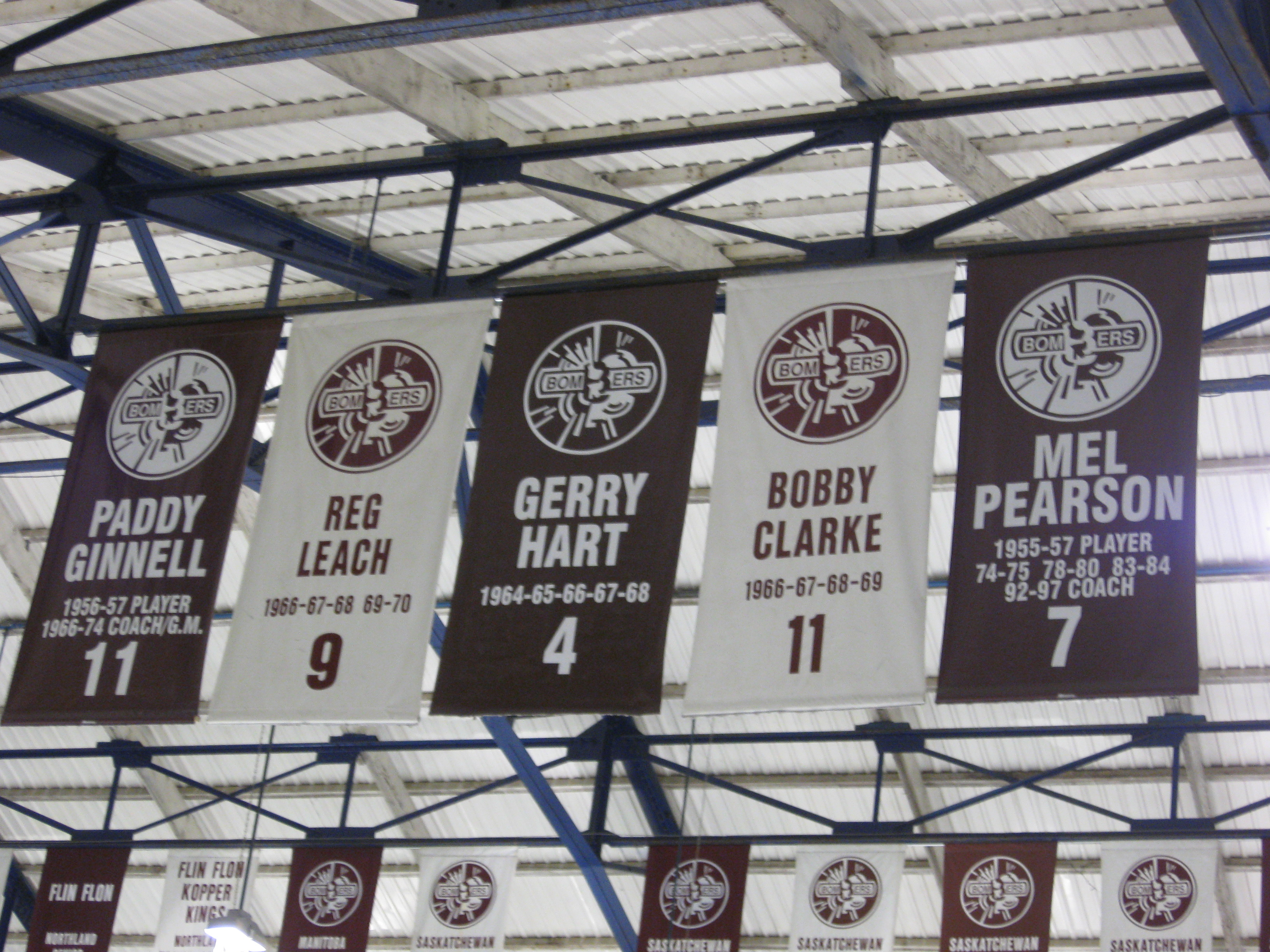
Retired jerseys that include some NHL greats

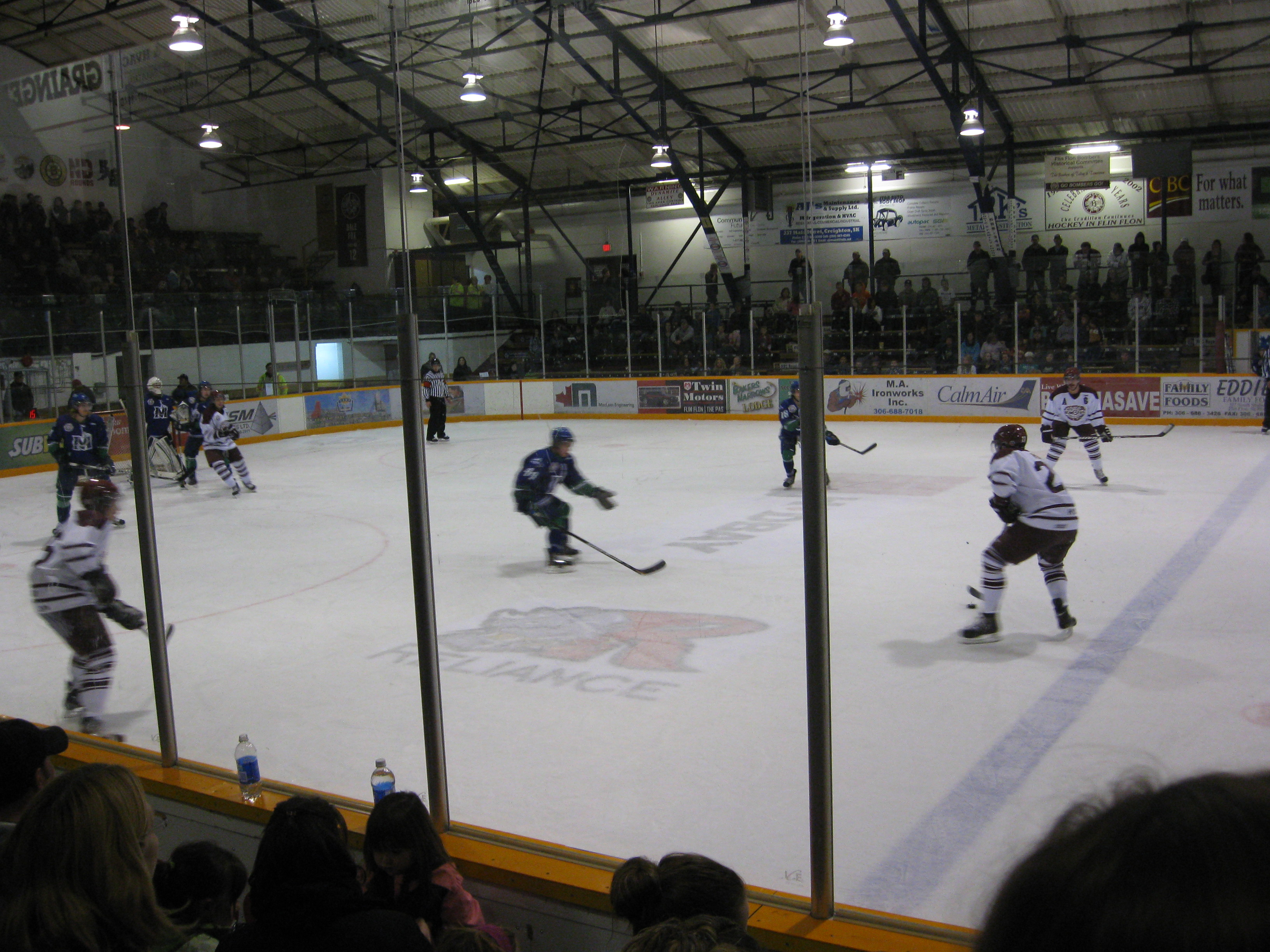
Flin Flon Bombers home game at the Whitney Forum

Flin Flon is the home of the Flin Flon Bombers of the Saskatchewan Junior Hockey League and the birthplace of NHL great and Hall of Fame member Bobby Clarke. As captain of the team, he led the Philadelphia Flyers to two NHL Stanley Cup championships in the 1970s, and was a star on the 1972 Team Canada Summit Series roster. Other NHLers hailing from Flin Flon include Ken Baird, Ken Baumgartner, Matt Davidson, Kim Davis, Dean Evason, Al Hamilton, Ted Hampson (who was captain of the Flin Flon Bombers Memorial Cup team in 1957 and the second player to ever receive the Bill Masterton Memorial Trophy), Gerry Hart, Ron Hutchinson, George Konik, Ray Maluta, Tom Gilmore, Dunc McCallum, Eric Nesterenko, Mel Pearson, Reid Simpson, David Struch, and Ernie Wakely. The games are hosted at the Whitney Forum.

== Media ==
Newspapers and magazines

- The Reminder – published every Wednesday – Flin Flon's only newspaper
- Northroots Magazine – a bi-monthly glossy, regional publication, northroots.ca published February, April, June, August, October and December. In-flight reading on Calm Air.
- Cottage North Magazine – local interest, local stories, and local people – ceased publication in September 2015

Books

- Tales From a Town With a Funny Name – by Doug Evans

Radio

- CFAR 590 (AM), 102.9 (FM)
- CBWF-FM 90.9 (CBC Radio One)
- CKSB-4-FM 99.9 (Ici Radio-Canada Première)
- CIFF-FM 101.1 (NCI)

Television

- CKYF-TV channel 13 (CTV, analogue repeater of CKY-DT Winnipeg)
- Shaw Communications operates a community programming channel; CATV Channel 11: Shaw TV

Television in Flin Flon began in June 1962 with the opening of CBC Television station CBWBT channel 10. The station broadcast kine recordings, sent to the transmitter from CBWT Winnipeg. On March 1, 1969, the province-wide microwave system replaced the kine recordings originating at CBWT, giving citizens of Flin Flon access to live television. The repeater (along with Radio-Canada repeater CBWFT-2 channel 3) closed down July 31, 2012, due to the CBC's closure of its rebroadcasters.

== Law and government ==
=== Municipal ===
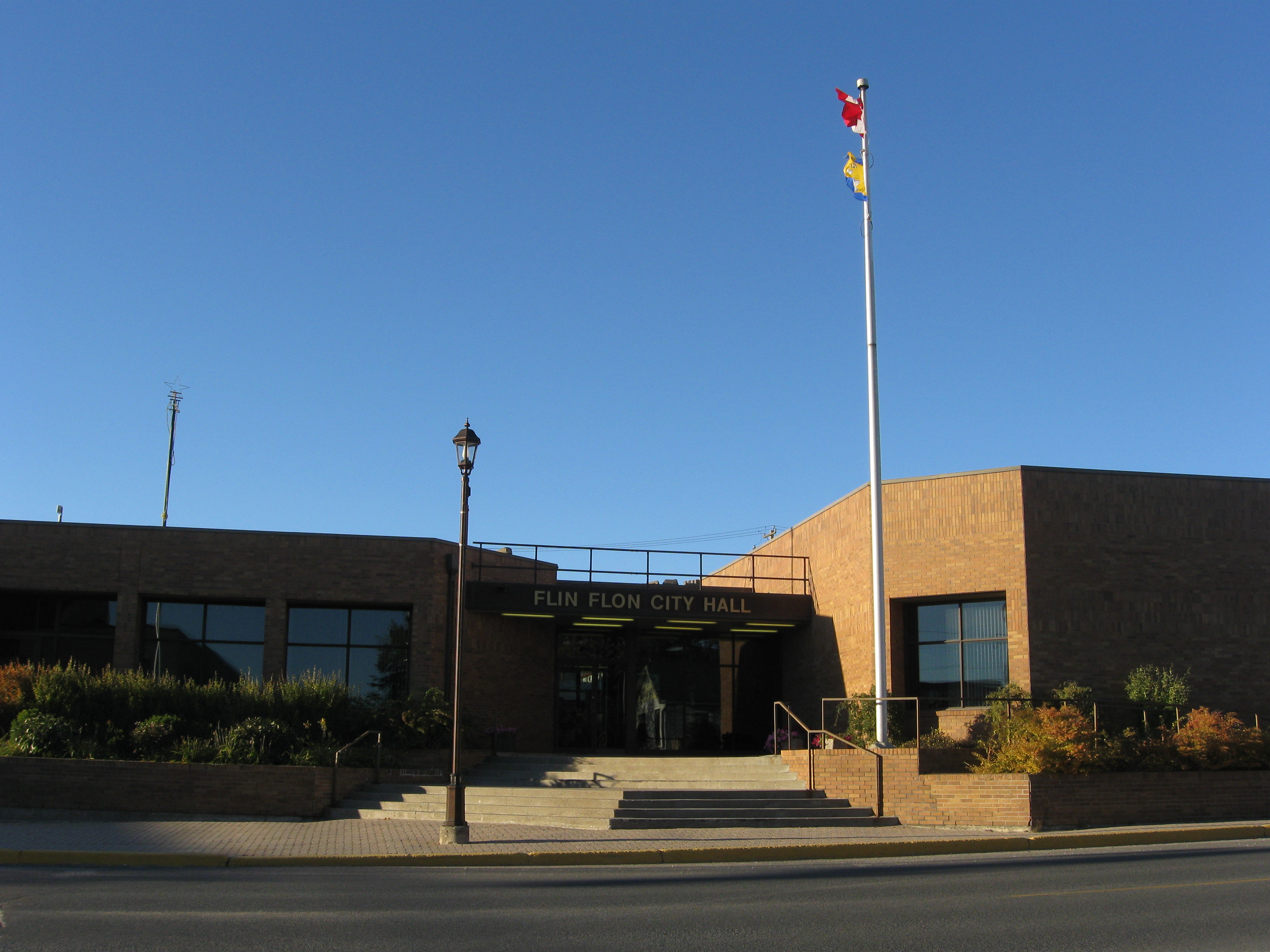
Flin Flon City Hall

The operations of the City of Flin Flon are administered by the city council, whose members set the policies. The city council consists of a mayor and six councillors who are elected and serve a term of four years. The current council was elected on October 24, 2018, and consists of the following members:

Flin Flon City Council
Position	Name
Mayor	George Fontaine
Councillor	Alison Dallas-Funk
Councillor	Judy Eagle
Councillor	Bill Hanson
Councillor	Steve Lytwyn
Councillor	Heather Richardson
Councillor	Mike Slipp

=== Provincial ===
Flin Flon federal election results
Year	Liberal		Conservative		New Democratic		Green	
2021	13%	259	45%	887	29%	579	3%	60
2019	10%	234	45%	1,037	38%	881	5%	113

Flin Flon Manitoba provincial election results
Year	PC		New Democratic		Liberal	
2019	38%	658	52%	887	5%	85
2016	27%	480	33%	583	26%	453

Flin Flon, Saskatchewan, provincial election results
Year	Saskatchewan		New Democratic	
2020	40%	16	56%	22
2016	58%	39	29%	20

Flin Flon is in the southwest corner of the Manitoba provincial electoral district of the same name, and is the only urban centre within the district. The current Member of the Legislative Assembly (MLA) is Tom Lindsey of the NDP. He has served in the Legislative Assembly of Manitoba since 2016.

The Saskatchewan portion of Flin Flon is in the electoral district of Cumberland. This district's current MLA is Jordan McPhail of the NDP. He has served in the Legislative Assembly of Saskatchewan since 2024.

=== Federal ===
The Manitoba portion of Flin Flon is in the federal riding of Churchill—Keewatinook Aski, whose current Member of Parliament (MP) is Lib member Rebecca Chartrand. She has served in the House of Commons of Canada since 2025.

The Saskatchewan portion of Flin Flon is in the electoral district of Desnethé—Missinippi—Churchill River, whose current MP is Lib member Buckley Belanger. He has served in the House of Commons since 2025.

== Notable people ==
- Jared Abrahamson, actor
- Roger Avary, film and television director, screenwriter, and producer
- Ken Baumgartner (born 1966), ice hockey player
- Bobby Clarke (born 1949), ice hockey player
- Caroline Cochrane, 13th Premier of the Northwest Territories
- Kim Davis, hockey player
- Dean Evason (born 1964), hockey coach
- Tom Gilmore (born 1948), hockey player
- Frank Gunston (1933-2016), created first modern knee replacement
- Al Hamilton (born 1946), hockey player
- Ted Hampson (born 1936), hockey player, hockey coach, amateur hockey scout
- Marshall Lawrence (born 1956), blues musician and psychologist
- Ray Martynuik (1950–2013), hockey player
- Andrea Menard (born 1971), actress and singer
- Eric Nesterenko (1933–2022), hockey player
- Mel Pearson (1938–1999), hockey player
- Dennis Schneider (1942–2023), politician
- Birk Sproxton (1943–2007), poet and novelist

== See also ==
- Flin Flon greenstone belt
- Lloydminster
- Texarkana
