= 2006–07 Chicago Blackhawks season =

National Hockey League team season

2006–07 Chicago Blackhawks
- Division: 5th Central
- Conference: 13th Western
- 2006–07 record: 31–42–9
- Home record: 17–20–4
- Road record: 14–22–5
- Goals for: 201
- Goals against: 258

Team information
- General manager: Dale Tallon
- Coach: Trent Yawney (Oct.–Nov.); Denis Savard (Nov.–Apr.)
- Captain: Adrian Aucoin
- Alternate captains: Martin Havlat; Martin Lapointe; Bryan Smolinski (Oct.–Feb.)
- Arena: United Center
- Average attendance: 12,727 (62.1%)
- Minor league affiliate: Norfolk Admirals

Team leaders
- Goals: Martin Havlat (25)
- Assists: Martin Havlat (32)
- Points: Martin Havlat (57)
- Penalty minutes: Brent Seabrook (104)
- Plus/minus: Martin Havlat (+15)
- Wins: Nikolai Khabibulin (25)
- Goals against average: Nikolai Khabibulin (2.86)

The 2006–07 Chicago Blackhawks season was the 81st season for the National Hockey League (NHL) franchise that was established on September 25, 1926.

== Regular season ==
Following twelve losses in a 15 game stretch, head coach Trent Yawney was fired on November 27 and replaced by assistant coach Denis Savard.

The Blackhawks struggled on the power play, finishing 30th overall in power-play goals scored (43) and power-play percentage (11.81%).

=== Season standings ===
Central Division
No.	CR		GP	W	L	OTL	GF	GA	Pts
1	1	**Detroit Red Wings**	82	50	19	13	254	199	113
2	4	**Nashville Predators**	82	51	23	8	272	212	110
3	10	St. Louis Blues	82	34	35	13	214	254	81
4	11	Columbus Blue Jackets	82	33	42	7	201	249	73
5	13	Chicago Blackhawks	82	31	42	9	201	258	71

Note: CR = Conference rank; GP = Games played; W = Wins; L = Losses; T = Ties; OTL = Overtime/shootout loss; GF = Goals for; GA = Goals against; PIM = Penalties in minutes; Pts = Points
Bolded teams qualified for the playoffs.

Western Conference
R		Div	GP	W	L	OTL	GF	GA	Pts
**1**	**z-Detroit Red Wings**	**CE**	**82**	**50**	**19**	**13**	**254**	**199**	**113**
**2**	**y-Anaheim Ducks**	**PA**	**82**	**48**	**20**	**14**	**258**	**208**	**110**
**3**	**y-Vancouver Canucks**	**NW**	**82**	**49**	**26**	**7**	**222**	**201**	**105**
**4**	**Nashville Predators**	**CE**	**82**	**51**	**23**	**8**	**272**	**212**	**110**
**5**	**San Jose Sharks**	**PA**	**82**	**51**	**26**	**5**	**258**	**199**	**107**
**6**	**Dallas Stars**	**PA**	**82**	**50**	**25**	**7**	**226**	**197**	**107**
**7**	**Minnesota Wild**	**NW**	**82**	**48**	**26**	**8**	**235**	**191**	**104**
**8**	**Calgary Flames**	**NW**	**82**	**43**	**29**	**10**	**258**	**226**	**96**
8.5
9	Colorado Avalanche	NW	82	44	31	7	272	251	95
10	St. Louis Blues	CE	82	34	35	13	214	254	81
11	Columbus Blue Jackets	CE	82	33	42	7	201	249	73
12	Edmonton Oilers	NW	82	32	43	7	195	248	71
13	Chicago Blackhawks	CE	82	31	42	9	201	258	71
14	Los Angeles Kings	PA	82	27	41	14	227	283	68
15	Phoenix Coyotes	PA	82	31	46	5	216	284	67

bold - qualified for playoffs, y - division title, z - best conference record
CE - Central Division, NW - Northwest Division, PA - Pacific Division

== Schedule and results ==
2006–07 regular season
October: 4–8–0 (home: 2–4–0; road: 2–4–0)

Game	Date	Visitor	Score	Home	OT	Decision	Attendance	Record	Points	Recap
1	October 5	Chicago	8 – 6	Nashville		Khabibulin	17,113	1–0–0	2	W
2	October 7	Columbus	5 – 4	Chicago		Khabibulin	17,133	1–1–0	2	L
3	October 12	Nashville	1 – 3	Chicago		Khabibulin	8,008	2–1–0	4	W
4	October 14	Chicago	3 – 4	St. Louis		Boucher	11,606	2–2–0	4	L
5	October 16	Chicago	5 – 3	Colorado		Khabibulin	17,681	3–2–0	6	W
6	October 18	Montreal	1 – 2	Chicago		Khabibulin	11,095	4–2–0	8	W
7	October 20	Chicago	4 – 5	Dallas		Boucher	18,198	4–3–0	8	L
8	October 21	St. Louis	4 – 3	Chicago		Khabibulin	13,254	4–4–0	8	L
9	October 25	Vancouver	5 – 0	Chicago		Boucher	11,641	4–5–0	8	L
10	October 28	Anaheim	3 – 0	Chicago		Boucher	13,580	4–6–0	8	L
11	October 30	Chicago	0 – 3	Philadelphia		Boucher	18,876	4–7–0	8	L
12	October 31	Chicago	2 – 5	NY Islanders		Boucher	8,739	4–8–0	8	L

November: 4–4–2 (home: 3–1–0; road: 1–3–2)

Game	Date	Visitor	Score	Home	OT	Decision	Attendance	Record	Points	Recap
13	November 2	Detroit	2 – 1	Chicago		Boucher	15,174	4–9–0	8	L
14	November 9	Chicago	1 – 2	New Jersey	SO	Boucher	10,978	4–9–1	9	OTL
15	November 10	St. Louis	1 – 3	Chicago		Caron	14,568	5–9–1	11	W
16	November 12	Columbus	0 – 1	Chicago		Boucher	14,078	6–9–1	13	W
17	November 16	Chicago	2 – 3	Phoenix	SO	Boucher	15,963	6–9–2	14	OTL
18	November 17	Chicago	4 – 3	Anaheim	SO	Khabibulin	16,526	7–9–2	16	W
19	November 19	Chicago	1 – 2	Vancouver		Khabibulin	18,630	7–10–2	16	L
20	November 22	Chicago	1 – 4	Calgary		Khabibulin	19,289	7–11–2	16	L
21	November 24	Chicago	1 – 5	Edmonton		Boucher	16,839	7–12–2	16	L
22	November 29	Dallas	1 – 2	Chicago		Khabibulin	13,164	8–12–2	18	W

December: 8–5–3 (home: 5–3–1; road: 3–2–2)

Game	Date	Visitor	Score	Home	OT	Decision	Attendance	Record	Points	Recap
23	December 1	St. Louis	2 – 5	Chicago		Khabibulin	12,110	9–12–2	20	W
24	December 2	Chicago	4 – 3	Nashville	OT	Khabibulin	15,530	10–12–2	22	W
25	December 5	Chicago	2 – 3	Minnesota	SO	Khabibulin	18,568	10–12–3	23	OTL
26	December 7	Phoenix	2 – 1	Chicago	SO	Khabibulin	9,078	10–12–4	24	OTL
27	December 9	Chicago	4 – 5	Minnesota	OT	Boucher	18,568	10–12–5	25	OTL
28	December 10	Edmonton	1 – 4	Chicago		Khabibulin	11,523	11–12–5	27	W
29	December 12	Chicago	3 – 2	St. Louis		Khabibulin	10,812	12–12–5	29	W
30	December 14	Detroit	3 – 2	Chicago		Khabibulin	15,130	12–13–5	29	L
31	December 16	Chicago	6 – 4	Columbus		Khabibulin	17,288	13–13–5	31	W
32	December 17	Colorado	1 – 2	Chicago		Khabibulin	11,111	14–13–5	33	W
33	December 20	Nashville	2 – 1	Chicago		Khabibulin	10,201	14–14–5	33	L
34	December 22	Toronto	1 – 3	Chicago		Khabibulin	17,950	15–14–5	35	W
35	December 23	Chicago	2 – 3	Colorado		Khabibulin	17,347	15–15–5	35	L
36	December 26	Dallas	1 – 2	Chicago		Khabibulin	14,278	16–15–5	37	W
37	December 29	Boston	5 – 3	Chicago		Boucher	19,315	16–16–5	37	L
38	December 31	Chicago	1 – 3	Columbus		Khabibulin	18,136	16–17–5	37	L

January: 2–8–2 (home: 1–5–2; road: 1–3–0)

Game	Date	Visitor	Score	Home	OT	Decision	Attendance	Record	Points	Recap
39	January 2	Chicago	4 – 1	St. Louis		Khabibulin	11,069	17–17–5	39	W
40	January 4	Chicago	0 – 2	St. Louis		Khabibulin	11,849	17–18–5	39	L
41	January 5	Nashville	8 – 3	Chicago		Khabibulin	13,186	17–19–5	39	L
42	January 7	Phoenix	4 – 2	Chicago		Khabibulin	11,079	17–20–5	39	L
43	January 10	Buffalo	2 – 1	Chicago		Khabibulin	14,041	17–21–5	39	L
44	January 13	Chicago	3 – 6	Detroit		Khabibulin	20,066	17–22–5	39	L
45	January 14	Minnesota	4 – 3	Chicago	SO	Khabibulin	11,091	17–22–6	40	OTL
46	January 16	Columbus	5 – 4	Chicago	OT	Khabibulin	10,263	17–22–7	41	OTL
47	January 19	Minnesota	3 – 0	Chicago		Boucher	12,333	17–23–7	41	L
48	January 20	Chicago	3 – 6	Nashville		Khabibulin	17,113	17–24–7	41	L
49	January 26	Nashville	3 – 1	Chicago		Khabibulin	11,162	17–25–7	41	L
50	January 28	Calgary	3 – 4	Chicago	OT	Khabibulin	11,182	18–25–7	43	W

February: 5–6–2 (home: 1–2–1; road: 4–4–1)

Game	Date	Visitor	Score	Home	OT	Decision	Attendance	Record	Points	Recap
51	February 1	Chicago	3 – 2	Los Angeles	OT	Khabibulin	16,958	19–25–7	45	W
52	February 3	Chicago	2 – 4	San Jose		Khabibulin	17,496	19–26–7	45	L
53	February 6	Chicago	3 – 2	Calgary	SO	Khabibulin	19,289	20–26–7	47	W
54	February 7	Chicago	3 – 0	Vancouver		Lalime	18,630	21–26–7	49	W
55	February 9	Chicago	1 – 2	Edmonton		Khabibulin	16,839	21–27–7	49	L
56	February 11	Chicago	5 – 4	Columbus		Khabibulin	17,054	22–27–7	51	W
57	February 14	Chicago	4 – 5	Pittsburgh	SO	Khabibulin	17,051	22–27–8	52	OTL
58	February 16	Vancouver	2 – 1	Chicago	SO	Lalime	14,552	22–27–9	53	OTL
59	February 18	Chicago	1 – 2	NY Rangers		Lalime	18,200	22–28–9	53	L
60	February 21	Chicago	2 – 4	Detroit		Khabibulin	20,066	22–29–9	53	L
61	February 22	San Jose	2 – 0	Chicago		Lalime	10,125	22–30–9	53	L
62	February 25	St. Louis	1 – 5	Chicago		Khabibulin	14,144	23–30–9	55	W
63	February 27	Detroit	4 – 1	Chicago		Khabibulin	15,131	23–31–9	55	L

March: 5–9–0 (home: 3–5–0; road: 2–4–0)

Game	Date	Visitor	Score	Home	OT	Decision	Attendance	Record	Points	Recap
64	March 1	Colorado	6 – 1	Chicago		Khabibulin	10,522	23–32–9	55	L
65	March 2	Chicago	2 – 6	Detroit		Lalime	20,066	23–33–9	55	L
66	March 4	Ottawa	3 – 4	Chicago	SO	Lalime	13,917	24–33–9	57	W
67	March 6	Los Angeles	0 – 3	Chicago		Khabibulin	9,118	25–33–9	59	W
68	March 10	Chicago	7 – 5	Phoenix		Khabibulin	17,086	26–33–9	61	W
69	March 13	Chicago	1 – 7	San Jose		Lalime	17,496	26–34–9	61	L
70	March 15	Chicago	4 – 3	Los Angeles	SO	Khabibulin	16,110	27–34–9	63	W
71	March 16	Chicago	2 – 5	Anaheim		Khabibulin	17,174	27–35–9	63	L
72	March 20	Chicago	2 – 5	Columbus		Khabibulin	15,195	27–36–9	63	L
73	March 21	San Jose	4 – 1	Chicago		Lalime	10,374	27–37–9	63	L
74	March 23	Los Angeles	2 – 1	Chicago		Khabibulin	13,133	27–38–9	63	L
75	March 25	Calgary	3 – 2	Chicago		Khabibulin	10,178	27–39–9	63	L
76	March 28	Anaheim	3 – 1	Chicago		Khabibulin	11,295	27–40–9	63	L
77	March 30	Columbus	1 – 3	Chicago		Lalime	14,111	28–40–9	65	W

April: 3–2–0 (home: 2–0–0; road: 1–2–0)

Game	Date	Visitor	Score	Home	OT	Decision	Attendance	Record	Points	Recap
78	April 1	Edmonton	1 – 2	Chicago		Khabibulin	12,193	29–40–9	67	W
79	April 3	Chicago	3 – 2	Nashville	SO	Lalime	14,663	30–40–9	69	W
80	April 5	Detroit	2 – 3	Chicago	SO	Khabibulin	16,288	31–40–9	71	W
81	April 7	Chicago	2 – 7	Detroit		Lalime	20,066	31–41–9	71	L
82	April 8	Chicago	2 – 3	Dallas		Khabibulin	17,932	31–42–9	71	L

Legend: W Win (2 points) L Loss (0 points) OTL Overtime/shootout loss (1 point)

== Player statistics ==
=== Scoring ===
- Position abbreviations: C = Center; D = Defense; G = Goaltender; LW = Left wing; RW = Right wing
- † = Joined team via a transaction (e.g., trade, waivers, signing) during the season. Stats reflect time with the Blackhawks only.
- ‡ = Left team via a transaction (e.g., trade, waivers, release) during the season. Stats reflect time with the Blackhawks only.

No.	Player	Pos	Regular season					
No.	Player	Pos	GP	G	A	Pts	+/-	PIM
24	Martin Havlat	RW	56	25	32	57	15	28
16	Radim Vrbata	RW	77	14	27	41	−4	26
51	Jeff Hamilton	C	70	18	21	39	−4	22
15	Tuomo Ruutu	C	71	17	21	38	4	95
11	Bryan Smolinski‡	C	62	14	23	37	10	29
10	Patrick Sharp	C	80	20	15	35	−15	74
2	Duncan Keith	D	82	2	29	31	0	76
19	Denis Arkhipov	C	79	10	17	27	−13	54
22	Martin Lapointe	RW	82	13	11	24	−14	98
7	Brent Seabrook	D	81	4	20	24	−6	104
14	Rene Bourque	LW	44	7	10	17	−4	38
8	Tony Salmelainen	LW	57	6	11	17	−3	26
33	Adrian Aucoin	D	59	4	12	16	−22	50
12	Peter Bondra†	RW	37	5	9	14	2	26
6	Lasse Kukkonen‡	D	54	5	9	14	5	30
17	Michael Holmqvist	C	63	6	7	13	−5	31
43	James Wisniewski	D	50	2	8	10	3	39
26	Michal Handzus	C	8	3	5	8	4	6
25	Cam Barker	D	35	1	7	8	−12	44
5	Jassen Cullimore	D	65	1	6	7	−6	64
23	Jim Vandermeer	D	46	1	6	7	−3	53
29	Jason Williams†	C	20	4	2	6	−6	20
27	Craig MacDonald	LW	25	3	2	5	−2	14
57	Karl Stewart†‡	LW	37	2	3	5	−2	43
47	Martin St. Pierre	C	14	1	3	4	−3	8
52	Dustin Byfuglien	D	9	1	2	3	−2	10
34	Nikita Alexeev†	RW	15	2	0	2	−3	0
38	Bryan Bickell	LW	3	2	0	2	1	0
20	Brandon Bochenski‡	RW	10	2	0	2	−2	2
32	Jonas Nordqvist	C	3	0	2	2	1	2
44	Danny Richmond	D	22	0	2	2	−1	48
49	Carl Corazzini	C	7	0	1	1	0	2
58	P. A. Parenteau†	LW	5	0	1	1	−1	2
28	Michael Blunden	RW	9	0	0	0	−5	10
36	Dave Bolland	C	1	0	0	0	−1	0
31	Brian Boucher‡	G	15	0	0	0		0
29	Troy Brouwer	RW	10	0	0	0	−7	7
37	Adam Burish	RW	9	0	0	0	−4	2
30	Sebastien Caron‡	G	1	0	0	0		0
46	Colin Fraser	C	1	0	0	0	−1	2
12	Matt Keith‡	RW	2	0	0	0	−2	4
39	Nikolai Khabibulin	G	60	0	0	0		8
48	David Koci	LW	9	0	0	0	−3	88
40	Patrick Lalime	G	12	0	0	0		0
34	Reed Low	RW	6	0	0	0	−1	31

=== Goaltending ===
- ‡ = Left team via a transaction (e.g., trade, waivers, release) during the season. Stats reflect time with the Blackhawks only.

No.	Player	Regular season									
No.	Player	GP	W	L	OT	SA	GA	GAA	SV%	SO	TOI
39	Nikolai Khabibulin	60	25	26	5	1668	163	2.86	.902	1	3425
40	Patrick Lalime	12	4	6	1	317	33	3.07	.896	1	645
31	Brian Boucher‡	15	1	10	3	389	45	3.27	.884	1	827
30	Sebastien Caron‡	1	1	0	0	25	1	1.00	.960	0	60

== Awards and records ==
=== Awards ===
Type	Award/honor	Recipient	Ref
League (in-season)	NHL All-Star Game selection	Martin Havlat	
League (in-season)	NHL Second Star of the Week	Martin Havlat (October 15)	
League (in-season)	NHL Second Star of the Week	Nikolai Khabibulin (December 3)	
League (in-season)	NHL Second Star of the Week	Martin Havlat (February 11)	
League (in-season)	NHL Second Star of the Week	Jeff Hamilton (March 11)	
League (in-season)	NHL YoungStars Game selection	Brent Seabrook	

=== Milestones ===
Milestone	Player	Date	Ref
First game	Adam Burish	October 14, 2006	
First game	Mike Blunden	October 25, 2006	
First game	Dave Bolland	October 25, 2006	
First game	Troy Brouwer	December 23, 2006	
First game	Colin Fraser	January 7, 2007	
First game	P. A. Parenteau	February 7, 2007	
First game	David Koci	March 10, 2007	
First game	Bryan Bickell	April 5, 2007	
First game	Jonas Nordquist	April 5, 2007	

== Transactions ==
The Blackhawks were involved in the following transactions from June 20, 2006, the day after the deciding game of the 2006 Stanley Cup Finals, through June 6, 2007, the day of the deciding game of the 2007 Stanley Cup Finals.

=== Trades ===
Date	Details		Ref
June 24, 2006	To Chicago Blackhawks: 6th-round pick in 2008	To Florida Panthers: Craig Anderson	
June 24, 2006	To Chicago Blackhawks: 3rd-round pick in 2006	To Toronto Maple Leafs: Columbus' 4th-round pick in 2006; Colorado's 4th-round pick in 2006	
July 9, 2006	To Chicago Blackhawks: Josh Hennessy; Tom Preissing	To San Jose Sharks: Mark Bell	
July 9, 2006	To Chicago Blackhawks: Martin Havlat; Bryan Smolinski	To Ottawa Senators: Michal Barinka; Josh Hennessy; Tom Preissing; 3rd-round pick in 2008	
August 2, 2006	To Chicago Blackhawks: Vaclav Pletka	To Philadelphia Flyers: Eric Meloche	
August 4, 2006	To Chicago Blackhawks: Michal Handzus	To Philadelphia Flyers: Kyle Calder	
December 28, 2006	To Chicago Blackhawks: P. A. Parenteau; Bruno St. Jacques	To Anaheim Ducks: Sebastien Caron; Chris Durno; Matt Keith	
February 3, 2007	To Chicago Blackhawks: Kris Versteeg; Conditional 5th-round pick in 2008	To Boston Bruins: Brandon Bochenski	
February 26, 2007	To Chicago Blackhawks: Conditional 2nd-round pick	To Vancouver Canucks: Bryan Smolinski	
February 26, 2007	To Chicago Blackhawks: Kyle Calder	To Philadelphia Flyers: Lasse Kukkonen; 3rd-round pick in 2007	
February 26, 2007	To Chicago Blackhawks: Jason Williams	To Detroit Red Wings: Kyle Calder	
February 27, 2007	To Chicago Blackhawks: Nikita Alexeev	To Tampa Bay Lightning: Karl Stewart; 6th-round pick in 2007	

=== Players acquired ===
Date	Player	Former team	Term	Via	Ref
July 1, 2006	Patrick Lalime	St. Louis Blues	1-year	Free agency	
July 6, 2006	Denis Arkhipov	Khimik Moscow Oblast (RSL)	1-year	Free agency	
July 17, 2006	Carl Corazzini	Norfolk Admirals (AHL)	1-year	Free agency	
July 17, 2006	Jordan Hendry	Norfolk Admrials (AHL)	2-year	Free agency	
July 17, 2006	David Koci	Pittsburgh Penguins	1-year	Free agency	
July 27, 2006	Reed Low	St. Louis Blues	1-year	Free agency	
August 1, 2006	Craig MacDonald	Calgary Flames	1-year	Free agency	
August 8, 2006	Sebastien Caron	Pittsburgh Penguins	1-year	Free agency	
September 23, 2006	Brian Boucher	Calgary Flames	1-year	Free agency	
September 25, 2006	Chris Durno	Milwaukee Admirals (AHL)		Free agency	
September 29, 2006	Jeff Hamilton	New York Islanders	1-year	Free agency	
October 26, 2006	Karl Stewart	Pittsburgh Penguins		Waivers	
December 10, 2006	Peter Bondra	Atlanta Thrashers	1-year	Free agency	
June 4, 2007	Magnus Johansson	Linkopings HC (SHL)		Free agency	

=== Players lost ===
Date	Player	New team	Via (Note: In parentheses is the player's free agency group on July 1 if applicable.)	Ref
June 26, 2006	Matthew Barnaby	Dallas Stars (Note: Barnaby signed with Dallas on July 5.)	Buyout	
June 26, 2006	Curtis Brown	San Jose Sharks (Note: Brown signed with San Jose on July 1.)	Buyout	
July 1, 2006	Mike Brown (Note: Brown retired.)		Contract expiration (VI)	
July 1, 2006	Eric Daze (Note: Daze retired.)		Contract expiration (III)	
July 4, 2006	Vladimir Gusev	Lokomotiv Yaroslavl (RSL)	Free agency (UFA)	
July 5, 2006	Mark Cullen	Philadelphia Flyers	Free agency (VI)	
July 7, 2006	Nick Kuiper	Manitoba Moose (AHL)	Free agency (UFA)	
July 7, 2006	Adam Munro	HC Fribourg-Gotteron (NLA)	Free agency (Note: Chicago retained Munro's NHL rights.)	
July 16, 2006	Shawn Thornton	Anaheim Ducks	Free agency (VI)	
July 17, 2006	Jason Morgan	Minnesota Wild	Free agency (III)	
July 18, 2006	Quintin Laing	Washington Capitals	Free agency (UFA)	
July 26, 2006	Pavel Vorobyev	Khimik Moscow Oblast (RSL)	Free agency (II) (Note: Chicago retained Vorobyev's NHL rights through the 2008–09 season.)	
August 4, 2006	Ajay Baines	Hamilton Bulldogs (AHL)	Free agency (VI)	
August 31, 2006	Milan Bartovic	Malmo Redhawks (SHL)	Free agency (VI)	
February 27, 2007	Brian Boucher	Columbus Blue Jackets	Waivers	
May 16, 2007	Jonas Nordqvist	Frolunda HC (SHL)	Free agency	
June 5, 2007	Denis Arkhipov	Ak Bars Kazan (RSL)	Free agency	

=== Signings ===
Date	Player	Term	Contract type	Ref
July 9, 2006	Martin Havlat	3-year	Re-signing	
July 10, 2006	Lasse Kukkonen	1-year	Re-signing	
July 10, 2006	Tony Salmelainen	2-year	Re-signing	
July 10, 2006	Patrick Sharp	2-year	Re-signing	
July 13, 2006	Rene Bourque	2-year	Re-signing	
July 13, 2006	Michael Holmqvist	1-year	Re-signing	
July 13, 2006	Duncan Keith	4-year	Re-signing	
July 17, 2006	Radim Vrbata	2-year	Re-signing	
July 27, 2006	Kyle Calder	1-year	Arbitration award	
August 1, 2006	Brandon Bochenski	1-year	Re-signing	
August 1, 2006	Matt Keith	1-year	Re-signing	
August 1, 2006	Jim Vandermeer	1-year	Re-signing	
September 13, 2006	Tuomo Ruutu	2-year	Re-signing	
March 22, 2007	Jack Skille	3-year	Entry-level	
April 18, 2007	Patrick Lalime	1-year	Extension	
May 15, 2007	Evan Brophey	3-year	Entry-level	
May 16, 2007	Jonathan Toews	3-year	Entry-level	
May 31, 2007	Niklas Hjalmarsson	3-year	Entry-level	
June 4, 2007	Adam Hobson	3-year	Entry-level	
June 4, 2007	Petri Kontiola	3-year	Entry-level	

== Draft picks ==
Chicago's picks at the 2006 NHL entry draft in Vancouver, British Columbia.

Round	#	Player	Nationality	NHL team	College/junior/club team (league)
1	3	Jonathan Toews (C/W)	Canada	Chicago Blackhawks	University of North Dakota (NCHC)
2	33	Igor Makarov (RW)	Russia	Chicago Blackhawks	Krylya Sovetov (Russia Pro Hockey League)
2	61	Simon Danis-Pepin (D)	Canada	Chicago Blackhawks (from Ottawa)	University of Maine (Hockey East)
3	76	Tony Lagerstrom (C)	Sweden	Chicago Blackhawks (from Toronto)	Södertälje SK (Elitserien)
4	95	Ben Shutron (D)	Canada	Chicago Blackhawks (from Pittsburgh)	Kingston Frontenacs (OHL)
4	96	Joe Palmer (G)	United States	Chicago Blackhawks	U.S. National Team Development Program (USHL)
6	156	Jan-Mikael Juutilainen (C)	Finland	Chicago Blackhawks	Jokerit (SM-liiga)
6	169	Chris Auger (C)	Canada	Chicago Blackhawks (from Montreal)	Wellington Dukes (OPJHL)
7	186	Peter LeBlanc (C/LW)	Canada	Chicago Blackhawks	Hamilton Red Wings (OPJHL)

== See also ==
- 2006–07 NHL season
