= 2006–07 Detroit Red Wings season =

Sports season

2006–07 Detroit Red Wings
- Central Division champions
- Division: 1st Central
- Conference: 1st Western
- 2006–07 record: 50–19–13
- Home record: 29–4–8
- Road record: 21–15–5
- Goals for: 254
- Goals against: 199

Team information
- General manager: Ken Holland
- Coach: Mike Babcock
- Captain: Nicklas Lidstrom
- Alternate captains: Kris Draper; Henrik Zetterberg
- Arena: Joe Louis Arena
- Average attendance: 20,066 (100%)
- Minor league affiliates: Grand Rapids Griffins; Toledo Storm

Team leaders
- Goals: Henrik Zetterberg (33)
- Assists: Pavel Datsyuk (60)
- Points: Pavel Datsyuk (87)
- Penalty minutes: Robert Lang (66)
- Plus/minus: Nicklas Lidstrom (40)
- Wins: Dominik Hasek (38)
- Goals against average: Dominik Hasek (2.05)

The 2006–07 Detroit Red Wings season was the 81st National Hockey League season in Detroit, Michigan. The Wings entered a new era, following the retirement of longtime captain Steve Yzerman after 22 seasons (23 years) in the NHL, all spent with Detroit. The Wings named Yzerman a team vice-president, Yzerman's number 19 was retired by the Wings in January.

The Red Wings lost another longtime player in Brendan Shanahan, who signed with the New York Rangers, although they retained the services of goaltender Dominik Hasek, who re-signed with the club as a free agent. Hasek remained one of the NHL's goaltending leaders, helping the Red Wings remain in contention for top spot in the Western Conference, battling with their division rivals, the Nashville Predators.

Two Red Wings players represented the West at the 2007 All-Star Game in Dallas, Texas – Nicklas Lidstrom was elected as a starting defenceman, and registered an assist, where he was joined by forward Henrik Zetterberg.

== Regular season ==
On February 8, 2007, the Red Wings lost 1–0 at St. Louis. It was the first time that the Red Wings had been shut-out in a regular season game since January 7, 2004, when they lost at home 3–0 to the Boston Bruins. Prior to their loss to the Blues, the Red Wings had gone 175 consecutive regular season games without being shut-out.

=== Season standings ===
Central Division
No.	CR		GP	W	L	OTL	GF	GA	Pts
1	1	**Detroit Red Wings**	82	50	19	13	254	199	113
2	4	**Nashville Predators**	82	51	23	8	272	212	110
3	10	St. Louis Blues	82	34	35	13	214	254	81
4	11	Columbus Blue Jackets	82	33	42	7	201	249	73
5	13	Chicago Blackhawks	82	31	42	9	201	258	71

Note: CR = Conference rank; GP = Games played; W = Wins; L = Losses; T = Ties; OTL = Overtime/shootout loss; GF = Goals for; GA = Goals against; PIM = Penalties in minutes; Pts = Points
Bolded teams qualified for the playoffs.

Western Conference
R		Div	GP	W	L	OTL	GF	GA	Pts
**1**	**z-Detroit Red Wings**	**CE**	**82**	**50**	**19**	**13**	**254**	**199**	**113**
**2**	**y-Anaheim Ducks**	**PA**	**82**	**48**	**20**	**14**	**258**	**208**	**110**
**3**	**y-Vancouver Canucks**	**NW**	**82**	**49**	**26**	**7**	**222**	**201**	**105**
**4**	**Nashville Predators**	**CE**	**82**	**51**	**23**	**8**	**272**	**212**	**110**
**5**	**San Jose Sharks**	**PA**	**82**	**51**	**26**	**5**	**258**	**199**	**107**
**6**	**Dallas Stars**	**PA**	**82**	**50**	**25**	**7**	**226**	**197**	**107**
**7**	**Minnesota Wild**	**NW**	**82**	**48**	**26**	**8**	**235**	**191**	**104**
**8**	**Calgary Flames**	**NW**	**82**	**43**	**29**	**10**	**258**	**226**	**96**
8.5
9	Colorado Avalanche	NW	82	44	31	7	272	251	95
10	St. Louis Blues	CE	82	34	35	13	214	254	81
11	Columbus Blue Jackets	CE	82	33	42	7	201	249	73
12	Edmonton Oilers	NW	82	32	43	7	195	248	71
13	Chicago Blackhawks	CE	82	31	42	9	201	258	71
14	Los Angeles Kings	PA	82	27	41	14	227	283	68
15	Phoenix Coyotes	PA	82	31	46	5	216	284	67

bold - qualified for playoffs, y - division title, z - best conference record
CE - Central Division, NW - Northwest Division, PA - Pacific Division

== Playoffs ==
The Detroit Red Wings ended the 2006–07 regular season as the Western Conference's first seed.

== Schedule and results ==
=== Regular season ===
2006–07 regular season
October: 6–4–1 (home: 2–1–1; road: 4–3–0)

Game	Date	Visitor	Score	Home	OT	Decision	Attendance	Record	Points	Recap
1	October 5	Vancouver	3 – 1	Detroit		Hasek	20,066	0–1–0	0	L
2	October 7	Detroit	2 – 0	Pittsburgh		Hasek	15,318	1–1–0	2	W
3	October 11	Phoenix	2 – 9	Detroit		Hasek	20,066	2–1–0	4	W
4	October 13	Buffalo	3 – 2	Detroit	SO	Hasek	20,066	2–1–1	5	OTL
5	October 16	Detroit	3 – 1	Los Angeles		Osgood	17,417	3–1–1	7	W
6	October 18	Detroit	1 – 4	Anaheim		Hasek	14,767	3–2–1	7	L
7	October 19	Detroit	1 – 5	San Jose		Osgood	17,496	3–3–1	7	L
8	October 21	Detroit	1 – 3	Edmonton		Hasek	16,839	3–4–1	7	L
9	October 25	San Jose	1 – 2	Detroit		Hasek	20,066	4–4–1	9	W
10	October 27	Detroit	4 – 3	Dallas		Hasek	18,584	5–4–1	11	W
11	October 28	Detroit	3 – 2	St. Louis		Osgood	12,700	6–4–1	13	W

November: 7–2–3 (home: 5–0–2; road: 2–2–1)

Game	Date	Visitor	Score	Home	OT	Decision	Attendance	Record	Points	Recap
12	November 1	Calgary	2 – 3	Detroit		Hasek	20,066	7–4–1	15	W
13	November 2	Detroit	2 – 1	Chicago		Osgood	15,174	8–4–1	17	W
14	November 4	Columbus	1 – 4	Detroit		Hasek	20,066	9–4–1	19	W
15	November 8	Edmonton	0 – 3	Detroit		Hasek	20,066	10–4–1	21	W
16	November 10	Nashville	0 – 3	Detroit		Hasek	20,066	11–4–1	23	W
17	November 14	Detroit	3 – 2	Vancouver		Hasek	18,630	12–4–1	25	W
18	November 17	Detroit	1 – 4	Calgary		Hasek	19,289	12–5–1	25	L
19	November 18	Detroit	3 – 4	Edmonton	SO	MacDonald	16,839	12–5–2	26	OTL
20	November 22	Vancouver	4 – 3	Detroit	OT	Hasek	20,066	12–5–3	27	OTL
21	November 24	St. Louis	3 – 2	Detroit	SO	Hasek	20,066	12–5–4	28	OTL
22	November 25	Detroit	2 – 6	Nashville		MacDonald	16,835	12–6–4	28	L
23	November 27	Dallas	1 – 2	Detroit		Hasek	20,066	13–6–4	30	W

December: 11–3–1 (home: 6–2–0; road: 5–1–1)

Game	Date	Visitor	Score	Home	OT	Decision	Attendance	Record	Points	Recap
24	December 1	Detroit	3 – 0	Minnesota		Hasek	18,568	14–6–4	32	W
25	December 2	San Jose	3 – 2	Detroit		MacDonald	20,066	14–7–4	32	L
26	December 5	Detroit	5 – 1	St. Louis		Hasek	19,646	15–7–4	34	W
27	December 7	St. Louis	3 – 4	Detroit	OT	Hasek	20,066	16–7–4	36	W
28	December 9	Toronto	1 – 5	Detroit		Hasek	20,066	17–7–4	38	W
29	December 12	Ottawa	3 – 2	Detroit		Hasek	20,066	17–8–4	38	L
30	December 14	Detroit	3 – 2	Chicago		Hasek	15,130	18–8–4	40	W
31	December 16	Detroit	2 – 1	New Jersey		Hasek	15,078	19–8–4	42	W
32	December 18	Detroit	3 – 4	Columbus		Osgood	17,046	19–9–4	42	L
33	December 20	Columbus	0 – 5	Detroit		Hasek	20,066	20–9–4	44	W
34	December 22	Minnesota	1 – 3	Detroit		Hasek	20,066	21–9–4	46	W
35	December 23	Detroit	2 – 3	Minnesota	OT	Osgood	18,568	21–9–5	47	OTL
36	December 27	Minnesota	1 – 3	Detroit		Hasek	20,066	22–9–5	49	W
37	December 28	Detroit	7 – 4	Columbus		Osgood	17,408	23–9–5	51	W
38	December 31	Los Angeles	2 – 6	Detroit		Hasek	20,066	24–9–5	53	W

January: 8–5–1 (home: 5–0–0; road: 3–5–1)

Game	Date	Visitor	Score	Home	OT	Decision	Attendance	Record	Points	Recap
39	January 2	Anaheim	1 – 2	Detroit		Hasek	20,066	25–9–5	55	W
40	January 4	Detroit	4 – 9	San Jose		Hasek	17,496	25–10–5	55	L
41	January 6	Detroit	2 – 4	Los Angeles		Osgood	18,118	25–11–5	55	L
42	January 7	Detroit	2 – 4	Anaheim		Hasek	17,418	25–12–5	55	L
43	January 9	Detroit	4 – 3	Colorado	SO	Hasek	18,007	26–12–5	57	W
44	January 11	Detroit	5 – 1	Phoenix		Hasek	14,386	27–12–5	59	W
45	January 13	Chicago	3 – 6	Detroit		Osgood	20,066	28–12–5	61	W
46	January 15	Montreal	0 – 2	Detroit		Hasek	20,066	29–12–5	63	W
47	January 17	Nashville	3 – 5	Detroit		Hasek	20,066	30–12–5	65	W
48	January 19	Detroit	1 – 3	Columbus		Hasek	18,136	30–13–5	65	L
49	January 20	Detroit	1 – 3	Colorado		MacDonald	18,007	30–14–5	65	L
50	January 26	Detroit	1 – 2	St. Louis	OT	Osgood	16,427	30–14–6	66	OTL
51	January 28	Colorado	1 – 3	Detroit		Hasek	20,066	31–14–6	68	W
52	January 30	Detroit	4 – 3	NY Islanders	OT	Hasek	12,322	32–14–6	70	W

February: 8–2–2 (home: 4–0–1; road: 4–2–1)

Game	Date	Visitor	Score	Home	OT	Decision	Attendance	Record	Points	Recap
53	February 2	St. Louis	3 – 5	Detroit		Hasek	20,066	33–14–6	72	W
54	February 5	Detroit	4 – 3	NY Rangers		Hasek	18,200	34–14–6	74	W
55	February 7	Phoenix	2 – 4	Detroit		Hasek	20,066	35–14–6	76	W
56	February 8	Detroit	0 – 1	St. Louis		MacDonald	11,285	35–15–6	76	L
57	February 11	Calgary	4 – 7	Detroit		MacDonald	20,066	36–15–6	78	W
58	February 12	Detroit	1 – 6	Philadelphia		MacDonald	19,575	36–16–6	78	L
59	February 14	Detroit	3 – 1	Dallas		Osgood	18,037	37–16–6	80	W
60	February 17	Detroit	4 – 1	Phoenix		Hasek	16,940	38–16–6	82	W
61	February 21	Chicago	2 – 4	Detroit		Hasek	20,066	39–16–6	84	W
62	February 23	Edmonton	4 – 3	Detroit	SO	Hasek	20,066	39–16–7	85	OTL
63	February 24	Detroit	3 – 4	Nashville	OT	Osgood	17,113	39–16–8	86	OTL
64	February 27	Detroit	4 – 1	Chicago		Hasek	15,131	40–16–8	88	W

March: 7–3–4 (home: 5–1–4; road: 2–2–0)

Game	Date	Visitor	Score	Home	OT	Decision	Attendance	Record	Points	Recap
65	March 2	Chicago	2–6	Detroit		Osgood	20,066	41–16–8	90	W
66	March 4	Colorado	4–3	Detroit	OT	Osgood	20,066	41–16–9	91	OTL
67	March 6	Nashville	3–4	Detroit	OT	Osgood	20,066	42–16–9	93	W
68	March 9	Los Angeles	2–3	Detroit	OT	Hasek	20,066	43–16–9	95	W
69	March 11	Boston	6–3	Detroit		Hasek	20,066	43–17–9	95	L
70	March 13	Detroit	5–2	Nashville		Osgood	17,113	44–17–9	97	W
71	March 14	Nashville	2–4	Detroit		Hasek	20,066	45–17–9	99	W
72	March 17	Detroit	1–4	Vancouver		Hasek	18,630	45–18–9	99	L
73	March 20	Detroit	1–2	Calgary		Hasek	19,289	45–19–9	99	L
74	March 22	Columbus	2–1	Detroit	OT	Osgood	20,066	45–19–10	100	OTL
75	March 24	St. Louis	3–2	Detroit	OT	Hasek	20,066	45–19–11	101	OTL
76	March 26	Anaheim	0–1	Detroit		Hasek	20,066	46–19–11	103	W
77	March 29	Detroit	2–1	Nashville		Osgood	16,646	47–19–11	105	W
78	March 30	Dallas	3–4	Detroit	OT	Hasek	20,066	47–19–12	106	OTL

April: 3–0–1 (home: 2–0–0; road: 1–0–1)

Game	Date	Visitor	Score	Home	OT	Decision	Attendance	Record	Points	Recap
79	April 1	Detroit	4–1	Columbus		Hasek	17,350	48–19–12	108	W
80	April 3	Columbus	0–3	Detroit		Hasek	20,066	49–19–12	110	W
81	April 5	Detroit	2–3	Chicago	OT	Osgood	16,288	49–19–13	111	OTL
82	April 7	Chicago	2–7	Detroit		Osgood	20,066	50–19–13	113	W

Legend: W Win (2 points) L Loss (0 points) OTL Overtime/shootout loss (1 point)

=== Playoffs ===
2007 Stanley Cup playoffs
Western Conference Quarterfinals: vs. (8) Calgary Flames — Detroit wins 4–2

Game	Date	Visitor	Score	Home	OT	Decision	Attendance	Series	Recap
1	April 12	Calgary	1 – 4	Detroit		Hasek	19,204	1 – 0	W
2	April 15	Calgary	1 – 3	Detroit		Hasek	19,751	2 – 0	W
3	April 17	Detroit	2 – 3	Calgary		Hasek	19,289	2 – 1	L
4	April 19	Detroit	2 – 3	Calgary		Hasek	19,289	2 – 2	L
5	April 21	Calgary	1 – 5	Detroit		Hasek	19,340	3 – 2	W
6	April 22	Detroit	2 – 1	Calgary	2OT	Hasek	19,289	4 – 2	W

Western Conference Semifinals: vs. (5) San Jose Sharks — Detroit wins 4–2

Game	Date	Visitor	Score	Home	OT	Decision	Attendance	Series	Recap
1	April 26	San Jose	2 – 0	Detroit		Hasek	18,712	0 – 1	L
2	April 28	San Jose	2 – 3	Detroit		Hasek	19,113	1 – 1	W
3	April 30	Detroit	1 – 2	San Jose		Hasek	17,496	1 – 2	L
4	May 2	Detroit	3 – 2	San Jose	1OT	Hasek	17,496	2 – 2	W
5	May 5	San Jose	1 – 4	Detroit		Hasek	19,937	3 – 2	W
6	May 7	Detroit	2 – 0	San Jose		Hasek	17,496	4 – 2	W

Western Conference Finals: vs. (2) Anaheim Ducks — Anaheim wins 4–2

Game	Date	Visitor	Score	Home	OT	Decision	Attendance	Series	Recap
1	May 11	Anaheim	1 – 2	Detroit		Hasek	19,939	1 – 0	W
2	May 13	Anaheim	4 – 3	Detroit	1OT	Hasek	19,620	1 – 1	L
3	May 15	Detroit	5 – 0	Anaheim		Hasek	17,358	2 – 1	W
4	May 17	Detroit	3 – 5	Anaheim		Hasek	17,375	2 – 2	L
5	May 20	Anaheim	2 – 1	Detroit	1OT	Hasek	20,003	2 – 3	L
6	May 22	Detroit	3 – 4	Anaheim		Hasek	17,380	2 – 4	L

Legend: W Win L Loss

== Player statistics ==
=== Scoring ===
- Position abbreviations: C = Center; D = Defense; G = Goaltender; LW = Left wing; RW = Right wing
- † = Joined team via a transaction (e.g., trade, waivers, signing) during the season. Stats reflect time with the Red Wings only.
- ‡ = Left team via a transaction (e.g., trade, waivers, release) during the season. Stats reflect time with the Red Wings only.

No.	Player	Pos	Regular season						Playoffs					
No.	Player	Pos	GP	G	A	Pts	+/-	PIM	GP	G	A	Pts	+/-	PIM
13	Pavel Datsyuk	C	79	27	60	87	36	20	18	8	8	16	2	8
40	Henrik Zetterberg	LW	63	33	35	68	26	36	18	6	8	14	1	12
5	Nicklas Lidstrom	D	80	13	49	62	40	46	18	4	14	18	0	6
96	Tomas Holmstrom	LW	77	30	22	52	13	58	15	5	3	8	2	14
20	Robert Lang	C	81	19	33	52	12	66	18	2	6	8	5	8
23	Mathieu Schneider	D	68	11	41	52	12	66	11	2	4	6	4	16
11	Daniel Cleary	RW	71	20	20	40	6	24	18	4	8	12	2	30
37	Mikael Samuelsson	RW	53	14	20	34	1	28	18	3	8	11	2	14
93	Johan Franzen	LW	69	10	20	30	20	37	18	3	4	7	8	10
33	Kris Draper	C	81	14	15	29	7	58	18	2	0	2	−5	24
29	Jason Williams‡	C	58	11	15	26	7	24	—	—	—	—	—	—
26	Jiri Hudler	C	76	15	10	25	16	36	6	0	2	2	2	4
55	Niklas Kronwall	D	68	1	21	22	0	54	—	—	—	—	—	—
22	Brett Lebda	D	74	5	13	18	16	61	12	0	2	2	4	8
51	Valtteri Filppula	C	73	10	7	17	8	20	18	3	2	5	−2	2
95	Danny Markov	D	66	4	12	16	25	59	18	0	0	0	−2	13
17	Kyle Calder†	LW	19	5	9	14	6	22	13	0	1	1	1	8
18	Kirk Maltby	RW	82	6	5	11	−9	50	18	1	1	2	0	10
24	Chris Chelios	D	71	0	11	11	11	34	18	1	6	7	7	12
3	Andreas Lilja	D	57	0	5	5	6	54	18	1	0	1	−4	10
44	Todd Bertuzzi†	RW	8	2	2	4	3	6	16	3	4	7	−2	15
39	Dominik Hasek	G	56	0	2	2		20	18	0	0	0		2
15	Josh Langfeld	RW	33	0	2	2	2	12	—	—	—	—	—	—
28	Tomas Kopecky	C	26	1	0	1	−2	22	4	0	0	0	−1	6
45	Kyle Quincey	D	6	1	0	1	0	0	13	0	0	0	0	2
17	Brad Norton	D	6	0	1	1	2	20	—	—	—	—	—	—
30	Chris Osgood	G	21	0	1	1		6	—	—	—	—	—	—
27	Darryl Bootland	RW	6	0	0	0	0	9	—	—	—	—	—	—
8	Matt Ellis	LW	16	0	0	0	−1	6	—	—	—	—	—	—
43	Matt Hussey	C	5	0	0	0	0	2	—	—	—	—	—	—
31	Joey MacDonald‡	G	8	0	0	0		0	—	—	—	—	—	—
36	Derek Meech	D	4	0	0	0	1	2	—	—	—	—	—	—

=== Goaltending ===
- ‡ = Left team via a transaction (e.g., trade, waivers, release) during the season. Stats reflect time with the Red Wings only.

No.	Player	Regular season										Playoffs								
No.	Player	GP	W	L	OT	SA	GA	GAA	SV%	SO	TOI	GP	W	L	SA	GA	GAA	SV%	SO	TOI
39	Dominik Hasek	56	38	11	6	1309	114	2.05	.913	8	3341	18	10	8	444	34	1.79	.923	2	1140
30	Chris Osgood	21	11	3	6	496	46	2.38	.907	0	1161	—	—	—	—	—	—	—	—	—
31	Joey MacDonald‡	8	1	5	1	211	27	3.46	.872	0	468	—	—	—	—	—	—	—	—	—

== Awards and records ==
=== Awards ===
Type	Award/honor	Recipient	Ref
League (annual)	James Norris Memorial Trophy	Nicklas Lidstrom	
League (annual)	Lady Byng Memorial Trophy	Pavel Datsyuk	
League (annual)	Mark Messier Leadership Award	Chris Chelios	
League (annual)	NHL First All-Star Team	Nicklas Lidstrom (Defense)	
League (in-season)	NHL All-Star Game selection	Nicklas Lidstrom (Note: Lidstrom was voted to the starting lineup.)	
League (in-season)	NHL All-Star Game selection	Henrik Zetterberg (Note: Zetterberg did not play and was replaced by Andy McDonald of the Anaheim Ducks.)	
League (in-season)	NHL First Star of the Month	Henrik Zetterberg (February)	
League (in-season)	NHL First Star of the Week	Henrik Zetterberg (February 11)	
League (in-season)	NHL First Star of the Week	Henrik Zetterberg (February 18)	
League (in-season)	NHL Second Star of the Month	Dominik Hasek (December)	
League (in-season)	NHL Third Star of the Week	Dominik Hasek (November 12)	
League (in-season)	NHL Third Star of the Week	Nicklas Lidstrom (February 4)	
League (in-season)	NHL Third Star of the Week	Dominik Hasek (April 1)	

=== Milestones ===
Milestone	Player	Date	Ref
First game	Joey MacDonald	October 19, 2006	
First game	Derek Meech	December 7, 2006	
First game	Matt Ellis	December 18, 2006	

== Transactions ==
The Red Wings were involved in the following transactions from June 20, 2006, the day after the deciding game of the 2006 Stanley Cup Finals, through June 6, 2007, the day of the deciding game of the 2007 Stanley Cup Finals.

=== Trades ===
Date	Details		Ref
June 24, 2006	To Detroit Red Wings: Florida's 2nd-round pick in 2006; Tampa Bay's 2nd-round pick in 2006	To Phoenix Coyotes: 1st-round pick in 2006; 5th-round pick in 2006	
September 12, 2006	To Detroit Red Wings: Conditional draft pick in 2007	To Vancouver Canucks: Drew MacIntyre	
February 26, 2007	To Detroit Red Wings: Kyle Calder	To Chicago Blackhawks: Jason Williams	
February 27, 2007	To Detroit Red Wings: Todd Bertuzzi	To Florida Panthers: Rights to Shawn Matthias; Conditional draft picks (Note: Condition not met. If Detroit re-signed Bertuzzi, Florida would have received a draft pick in 2007 and 2008. Bertuzzi signed as a free agent with the Anaheim Ducks on July 2, 2007.)	

=== Players acquired ===
Date	Player	Former team	Term	Via	Ref
July 13, 2006	Matt Hussey	Pittsburgh Penguins	1-year	Free agency	
July 13, 2006	Dan Smith	Edmonton Oilers	1-year	Free agency	
July 15, 2006	Krys Kolanos	Pittsburgh Penguins		Free agency	
July 26, 2006	Danny Markov	Nashville Predators	1-year	Free agency	
July 29, 2006	Josh Langfeld	Boston Bruins		Free agency	
July 31, 2006	Dominik Hasek	Ottawa Senators	1-year	Free agency	
August 7, 2006	Brendan Brooks	Peoria Rivermen (AHL)	1-year	Free agency	
August 8, 2006	Brad Norton	Ottawa Senators		Free agency	
August 14, 2006	Greg Johnson	Nashville Predators	1-year	Free agency	

=== Players lost ===
Date	Player	New team	Via (Note: In parentheses is the player's free agency group on July 1 if applicable.)	Ref
July 3, 2006	Steve Yzerman		Retirement (III)	
July 6, 2006	Mark Mowers	Boston Bruins	Free agency (III)	
July 9, 2006	Brendan Shanahan	New York Rangers	Free agency (III)	
July 10, 2006	Eric Manlow	Hamilton Bulldogs (AHL)	Free agency (III)	
July 17, 2006	Donald MacLean	Phoenix Coyotes	Free agency (III)	
July 19, 2006	Bryan Helmer	Phoenix Coyotes	Free agency (III)	
July 25, 2006	Cory Cross	Hamburg Freezers (DEL)	Free agency (III)	
August 8, 2006	Manny Legace	St. Louis Blues	Free agency (III)	
October 2006	Todd Jackson	Phoenix Roadrunners (ECHL)	Free agency (UFA)	
October 9, 2006	Kent McDonell	HC TPS (Liiga)	Free agency (VI)	
October 11, 2006	Greg Johnson		Retirement	
November 21, 2006	Jason Woolley	Malmo Redhawks (SHL)	Free agency (III)	
February 23, 2007	Joey MacDonald	Boston Bruins	Waivers	
May 30, 2007	Eric Himelfarb	Lausanne HC (NLB)	Free agency	

=== Signings ===
Date	Player	Term	Contract type	Ref
June 30, 2006	Nicklas Lidstrom	2-year	Re-signing	
July 1, 2006	Chris Osgood	2-year	Re-signing	
July 10, 2006	Daniel Cleary	2-year	Re-signing	
July 11, 2006	Brett Lebda	4-year	Re-signing	
July 14, 2006	Darryl Bootland		Re-signing	
July 14, 2006	Jiri Hudler		Re-signing	
July 17, 2006	Tomas Kopecky	1-year	Re-signing	
July 27, 2006	Jason Williams	2-year	Re-signing	
August 25, 2006	Johan Franzen	3-year	Re-signing	
September 27, 2006	Darren Helm	3-year	Entry-level	
November 24, 2006	Niklas Kronwall	5-year	Extension	
February 17, 2007	Tomas Holmstrom	3-year	Extension	
March 19, 2007	Tomas Kopecky	2-year	Extension	
April 4, 2007	Cory Emmerton	3-year	Entry-level	
April 6, 2007	Pavel Datsyuk	7-year	Extension	
April 12, 2007	Jan Mursak	3-year	Entry-level	
May 4, 2007	Kirk Maltby	3-year	Extension	
May 9, 2007	Igor Grigorenko	1-year	Entry-level	
June 1, 2007	Mattias Ritola	3-year	Entry-level	
June 1, 2007	Johan Ryno	3-year	Entry-level	

== Draft picks ==
Detroit's picks at the 2006 NHL entry draft in Vancouver, British Columbia. The Red Wings had no first-round pick in this draft, having dealt the 29th overall pick to the Phoenix Coyotes.

Round	#	Player	Nationality	NHL team	College/Junior/Club team (League)
2	41	Cory Emmerton (C/LW)	Canada	Detroit Red Wings (from Phoenix via Florida and Philadelphia)	Kingston Frontenacs (OHL)
2	47	Shawn Matthias (C)	Canada	Detroit Red Wings (from Phoenix via Tampa Bay and Philadelphia)	Belleville Bulls (OHL)
2	62	Dick Axelsson (W)	Sweden	Detroit Red Wings	Huddinge IK (Division 3)
3	92	Daniel Larsson (G)	Sweden	Detroit Red Wings	Hammarby IF (HockeyAllsvenskan)
6	182	Jan Mursak (LW)	Slovenia	Detroit Red Wings	Ceske Budejovice Jr. (Czech)
7	191	Nick Oslund (RW)	United States	Detroit Red Wings (from Phoenix)	Burnsville (USHS-MN)
7	212	Logan Pyett (D)	Canada	Detroit Red Wings	Regina Pats (WHL)

== Farm teams ==
=== Grand Rapids Griffins ===
The Griffins are Detroit's top affiliate in the American Hockey League in 2006–07.

=== Toledo Storm ===
The Storm are the Red Wings' ECHL affiliate for the 2006–07 season.

== See also ==
- 2006–07 NHL season
