= 2006–07 Los Angeles Kings season =

National Hockey League team season

2006–07 Los Angeles Kings
- Division: 4th Pacific
- Conference: 14th Western
- 2006–07 record: 27–41–14
- Home record: 16–16–9
- Road record: 11–25–5
- Goals for: 227
- Goals against: 283

Team information
- General manager: Dean Lombardi
- Coach: Marc Crawford
- Captain: Mattias Norstrom (Oct.–Feb.); Vacant (Feb.–Apr.)
- Alternate captains: Rob Blake; Craig Conroy (Oct.–Jan.); Aaron Miller; Scott Thornton
- Arena: Staples Center
- Average attendance: 16,859 (91.1%)
- Minor league affiliates: Manchester Monarchs; Reading Royals

Team leaders
- Goals: Alexander Frolov (35)
- Assists: Michael Cammalleri (46)
- Points: Michael Cammalleri (80)
- Penalty minutes: Raitis Ivanans (140)
- Plus/minus: Derek Armstrong (+13)
- Wins: Mathieu Garon (13)
- Goals against average: Mathieu Garon (2.66)

The 2006–07 Los Angeles Kings season was the 40th season (39th season of play) for the National Hockey League (NHL) franchise. This season marked the beginning of a rebuilding phase, as the team hired Marc Crawford as their new head coach, the former general manager of the San Jose Sharks, Dean Lombardi, as their new GM, former NHL goaltenders Ron Hextall as assistant GM (and GM of their AHL affiliate Manchester Monarchs), and Bill Ranford as goaltending coach. Their first big move came when they acquired rookie prospect Patrick O'Sullivan, along with a 2006 first-round draft pick (Trevor Lewis), from the Minnesota Wild for forward Pavol Demitra on June 24, 2006.

But the biggest move of the off-season for the Kings was acquiring goaltender Dan Cloutier from the Vancouver Canucks in exchange for a 2007 second-round draft pick and a 2009 conditional draft pick on July 5, 2006. He was then named the team's starting goaltender ahead of Mathieu Garon, whom many fans expected to be their number-one goaltender. Before the season got underway, he was signed to a two-year contract, expecting a great performance from the former Canuck. However, at the end of December, Dan Cloutier was last in save percentage and goals against average (GAA) amongst NHL goaltenders who have played at least 12 games.

Injuries to both Garon and Cloutier in January prompted the Kings to recall Yutaka Fukufuji as an emergency goaltender, who made his NHL debut on January 13 against the St. Louis Blues, becoming the first Japanese-born player in NHL history. On January 18, prior to a home game against St. Louis, the Kings claimed goaltender Sean Burke off of waivers from the Tampa Bay Lightning. Burke would be the fifth goaltender to play for the Kings during the season (after Cloutier, Garon, Barry Brust and Fukufuji). This marked the first time the Kings have had at least five goaltenders appear during one season since the 2000–01 season (Jamie Storr, Felix Potvin, Steve Passmore, Stephane Fiset and Travis Scott).

On January 20, 2007, prior to a night-game against the Phoenix Coyotes, the Los Angeles Kings officially retired Luc Robitaille's number 20 sweater. This makes him the fifth player to have his number retired by the Los Angeles Kings, along with Rogie Vachon, Marcel Dionne, Dave Taylor and Wayne Gretzky.

The Kings missed the playoffs for the fourth consecutive season.

== Regular season ==
The Kings struggled on the penalty kill, finishing the regular season 30th overall in penalty-kill percentage, at 77.86%.

=== Season standings ===
Pacific Division
No.	CR		GP	W	L	OTL	GF	GA	Pts
1	2	**Anaheim Ducks**	82	48	20	14	258	208	110
2	5	**San Jose Sharks**	82	51	26	5	258	199	107
3	6	**Dallas Stars**	82	50	25	7	226	197	107
4	14	Los Angeles Kings	82	27	41	14	227	283	68
5	15	Phoenix Coyotes	82	31	46	5	216	284	67

Note: CR = Conference rank; GP = Games played; W = Wins; L = Losses; T = Ties; OTL = Overtime/shootout loss; GF = Goals for; GA = Goals against; PIM = Penalties in minutes; Pts = Points
Bolded teams qualified for the playoffs.

Western Conference
R		Div	GP	W	L	OTL	GF	GA	Pts
**1**	**z-Detroit Red Wings**	**CE**	**82**	**50**	**19**	**13**	**254**	**199**	**113**
**2**	**y-Anaheim Ducks**	**PA**	**82**	**48**	**20**	**14**	**258**	**208**	**110**
**3**	**y-Vancouver Canucks**	**NW**	**82**	**49**	**26**	**7**	**222**	**201**	**105**
**4**	**Nashville Predators**	**CE**	**82**	**51**	**23**	**8**	**272**	**212**	**110**
**5**	**San Jose Sharks**	**PA**	**82**	**51**	**26**	**5**	**258**	**199**	**107**
**6**	**Dallas Stars**	**PA**	**82**	**50**	**25**	**7**	**226**	**197**	**107**
**7**	**Minnesota Wild**	**NW**	**82**	**48**	**26**	**8**	**235**	**191**	**104**
**8**	**Calgary Flames**	**NW**	**82**	**43**	**29**	**10**	**258**	**226**	**96**
8.5
9	Colorado Avalanche	NW	82	44	31	7	272	251	95
10	St. Louis Blues	CE	82	34	35	13	214	254	81
11	Columbus Blue Jackets	CE	82	33	42	7	201	249	73
12	Edmonton Oilers	NW	82	32	43	7	195	248	71
13	Chicago Blackhawks	CE	82	31	42	9	201	258	71
14	Los Angeles Kings	PA	82	27	41	14	227	283	68
15	Phoenix Coyotes	PA	82	31	46	5	216	284	67

bold - qualified for playoffs, y - division title, z - best conference record
CE - Central Division, NW - Northwest Division, PA - Pacific Division

== Schedule and results ==
2006–07 regular season
October: 4–8–2 (home: 3–3–2; road: 1–5–0)

Game	Date	Opponent	Score	OT	Decision	Attendance	Record	Points	Recap
1	October 6	@ Ducks	3 – 4		Cloutier	17,174	0–1–0	0	L
2	October 7	Blues	1 – 4		Garon	18,118	1–1–0	2	W
3	October 10	Islanders	2 – 4		Cloutier	14,394	2–1–0	4	W
4	October 12	Stars	4 – 1		Cloutier	14,167	2–2–0	4	L
5	October 14	Stars	4 – 1		Garon	17,052	2–3–0	4	L
6	October 16	Red Wings	3 – 1		Cloutier	17,417	2–4–0	4	L
7	October 18	Wild	1 – 2	OT	Cloutier	14,617	2–4–1	5	OTL
8	October 19	@ Coyotes	4 – 0		Garon	12,714	3–4–1	7	W
9	October 22	Ducks	3 – 2	SO	Garon	18,118	3–4–2	8	OTL
10	October 23	@ Avalanche	1 – 6		Cloutier	17,284	3–5–2	8	L
11	October 25	@ Wild	1 – 3		Cloutier	18,568	3–6–2	8	L
12	October 27	@ Blue Jackets	0 – 2		Cloutier	16,087	3–7–2	8	L
13	October 28	@ Stars	2 – 3		Garon	17,711	3–8–2	8	L
14	October 30	Rangers	1 – 4		Garon	17,236	4–8–2	10	W

November: 5–6–2 (home: 4–2–2; road: 1–4–0)

Game	Date	Opponent	Score	OT	Decision	Attendance	Record	Points	Recap
15	November 1	Penguins	4 – 3	OT	Cloutier	18,118	4–8–3	11	OTL
16	November 4	@ Coyotes	4 – 6		Garon	14,631	4–9–3	11	L
17	November 7	@ Avalanche	6 – 5		Cloutier	17,196	5–9–3	13	W
18	November 9	Sharks	7 – 3		Garon	16,618	5–10–3	13	L
19	November 11	Wild	3 – 2	SO	Garon	17,479	5–10–4	14	OTL
20	November 13	Sharks	2 – 4		Cloutier	16,667	6–10–4	16	W
21	November 16	Flyers	4 – 3		Cloutier	16,446	6–11–4	16	L
22	November 18	Coyotes	3 – 5		Cloutier	14,487	7–11–4	18	W
23	November 22	@ Sharks	3 – 6		Cloutier	17,496	7–12–4	18	L
24	November 24	@ Stars	3 – 5		Garon	18,532	7–13–4	18	L
25	November 25	Flames	1 – 3		Garon	17,043	8–13–4	20	W
26	November 27	Devils	2 – 3	SO	Garon	16,223	9–13–4	22	W
27	November 30	@ Coyotes	4 – 7		Brust	11,526	9–14–4	22	L

December: 5–8–1 (home: 2–4–1; road: 3–4–0)

Game	Date	Opponent	Score	OT	Decision	Attendance	Record	Points	Recap
28	December 2	Ducks	4 – 3		Cloutier	16,141	9–15–4	22	L
29	December 3	@ Ducks	3 – 2		Cloutier	17,174	10–15–4	24	W
30	December 7	Predators	4 – 1		Cloutier	15,119	10–16–4	24	L
31	December 9	Avalanche	4 – 5		Cloutier	17,079	11–16–4	26	W
32	December 12	Sharks	3 – 1		Cloutier	15,204	11–17–4	26	L
33	December 14	@ Sharks	4 – 2		Brust	17,496	12–17–4	28	W
34	December 16	Stars	4 – 3	SO	Brust	15,846	12–17–5	29	OTL
35	December 19	Flames	5 – 3		Cloutier	17,247	12–18–5	29	L
36	December 21	@ Blues	2 – 5		Cloutier	10,390	12–19–5	29	L
37	December 23	@ Predators	0 – 7		Cloutier	14,739	12–20–5	29	L
38	December 26	Coyotes	3 – 4	SO	Brust	18,118	13–20–5	31	W
39	December 28	@ Oilers	7 – 4		Garon	16,839	14–20–5	33	W
40	December 29	@ Flames	4 – 6		Brust	19,289	14–21–5	33	L
41	December 31	@ Red Wings	2 – 6		Garon	20,066	14–22–5	33	L

January: 3–8–1 (home: 2–3–1; road: 1–5–0)

Game	Date	Opponent	Score	OT	Decision	Attendance	Record	Points	Recap
42	January 3	Blue Jackets	0 – 3		Garon	16,451	15–22–5	35	W
43	January 6	Red Wings	2 – 4		Garon	18,118	16–22–5	37	W
44	January 8	Oilers	2 – 1	OT	Garon	16,224	16–22–6	38	OTL
45	January 11	Sharks	5 – 2		Garon	17,054	16–23–6	38	L
46	January 13	@ Blues	5 – 6		Fukufuji	17,868	16–24–6	38	L
47	January 15	@ Stars	1 – 3		Brust	17,992	16–25–6	38	L
48	January 16	@ Thrashers	2 – 6		Fukufuji	13,205	16–26–6	38	L
49	January 18	Blues	3 – 1		Brust	16,544	16–27–6	38	L
50	January 20	Coyotes	3 – 2		Fukufuji	18,346	16–28–6	38	L
51	January 26	@ Canucks	3 – 2	OT	Burke	18,630	17–28–6	40	W
52	January 27	@ Oilers	3 – 4		Burke	16,839	17–29–6	40	L
53	January 30	@ Flames	1 – 4		Burke	19,289	17–30–6	40	L

February: 4–2–4 (home: 1–1–2; road: 3–1–2)

Game	Date	Opponent	Score	OT	Decision	Attendance	Record	Points	Recap
54	February 1	Blackhawks	3 – 2	OT	Burke	16,958	17–30–7	41	OTL
55	February 3	@ Panthers	7 – 0		Burke	15,108	18–30–7	43	W
56	February 6	@ Lightning	2 – 3	SO	Burke	18,273	18–30–8	44	OTL
57	February 8	@ Capitals	3 – 4	OT	Garon	15,527	18–30–9	45	OTL
58	February 10	@ Predators	4 – 1		Burke	17,113	19–30–9	47	W
59	February 13	@ Hurricanes	1 – 2		Burke	15,765	19–31–9	47	L
60	February 17	Ducks	3 – 2	SO	Garon	18,118	19–31–10	48	OTL
61	February 18	@ Ducks	4 – 3	SO	Burke	17,363	20–31–10	50	W
62	February 22	Canucks	3 – 2		Garon	17,737	20–32–10	50	L
63	February 24	Avalanche	5 – 6	SO	Burke	18,118	21–32–10	52	W

March: 5–6–4 (home: 3–3–1; road: 2–3–3)

Game	Date	Opponent	Score	OT	Decision	Attendance	Record	Points	Recap
64	March 1	Ducks	4 - 3	OT	Burke	17,620	22–32–10	54	W
65	March 3	Predators	6 – 3		Burke	16,854	22–33–10	54	L
66	March 6	@ Blackhawks	0 – 3		Burke	9,118	22–34–10	54	L
67	March 7	@ Blue Jackets	2 – 3	OT	Garon	15,154	22–34–11	55	OTL
68	March 9	@ Red Wings	2 – 3	OT	Burke	20,066	22–34–12	56	OTL
69	March 11	@ Stars	3 – 4	OT	Burke	17,478	22–34–13	57	OTL
70	March 12	Oilers	1 – 5		Burke	16,954	23–34–13	59	W
71	March 15	Blackhawks	4 – 3	SO	Burke	16,110	23–34–14	60	OTL
72	March 17	Blue Jackets	3 – 5		Garon	17,197	24–34–14	62	W
73	March 18	@ Ducks	5 – 3		Garon	17,174	25–34–14	64	W
74	March 21	Stars	4 – 2		Burke	17,838	25–35–14	64	L
75	March 23	@ Blackhawks	2 – 1		Garon	13,133	26–35–14	66	W
76	March 24	@ Wild	1 – 4		Garon	18,568	26–36–14	66	L
77	March 27	@ Sharks	1 – 3		Burke	17,496	26–37–14	66	L
78	March 29	Canucks	4 – 2		Burke	17,916	26–38–14	66	L

April: 1–3–0 (home: 1–0–0; road: 0–3–0)

Game	Date	Opponent	Score	OT	Decision	Attendance	Record	Points	Recap
79	April 1	@ Sharks	2 – 6		Burke	17,496	26–39–14	66	L
80	April 3	@ Canucks	2 – 4		Garon	18,630	26–40–14	66	L
81	April 5	@ Coyotes	2 – 3		Burke	15,965	26–41–14	66	L
82	April 7	Coyotes	3 – 2		Garon	18,118	27–41–14	68	W

Legend: W Win (2 points) L Loss (0 points) OTL Overtime/shootout loss (1 point)

== Player statistics ==
=== Scoring ===
- Position abbreviations: C = Center; D = Defense; G = Goaltender; LW = Left wing; RW = Right wing
- † = Joined team via a transaction (e.g., trade, waivers, signing) during the season. Stats reflect time with the Kings only.
- ‡ = Left team via a transaction (e.g., trade, waivers, release) during the season. Stats reflect time with the Kings only.

No.	Player	Pos	Regular season					
No.	Player	Pos	GP	G	A	Pts	+/-	PIM
13	Michael Cammalleri	C	81	34	46	80	5	48
24	Alexander Frolov	LW	82	35	36	71	−8	34
11	Anze Kopitar	C	72	20	41	61	−12	24
17	Lubomir Visnovsky	D	69	18	40	58	1	26
23	Dustin Brown	LW	81	17	29	46	−21	54
7	Derek Armstrong	C	67	11	33	44	13	62
4	Rob Blake	D	72	14	20	34	−26	82
19	Sean Avery‡	C	55	10	18	28	−10	116
5	Brent Sopel‡	D	44	4	19	23	2	14
29	Tom Kostopoulos	RW	76	7	15	22	−2	73
21	Brian Willsie	RW	81	11	10	21	−20	49
12	Patrick O'Sullivan	C	44	5	14	19	−6	14
22	Craig Conroy‡	C	52	5	11	16	−13	38
27	Scott Thornton	LW	58	7	6	13	−15	85
38	Kevin Dallman	D	53	1	9	10	−13	12
15	Jamie Lundmark†	C	29	7	2	9	−8	25
8	Mike Weaver	D	39	3	6	9	−4	16
14	Mattias Norstrom‡	D	62	2	7	9	−20	40
41	Raitis Ivanans	LW	66	4	4	8	−12	140
6	Jamie Heward†	D	19	2	6	8	−2	20
3	Aaron Miller	D	82	0	8	8	−14	60
44	Jaroslav Modry†	D	19	0	8	8	1	22
9	Konstantin Pushkarev‡	RW	16	2	2	4	−2	8
28	Oleg Tverdovsky	D	26	0	4	4	−10	10
73	John Zeiler†	RW	23	1	2	3	−2	22
25	Noah Clarke	LW	13	2	0	2	−6	4
15	Jeff Cowan‡	LW	21	0	2	2	−1	32
49	Peter Harrold	D	12	0	2	2	0	8
26	Marty Murray†	C	19	0	2	2	−5	4
10	Alyn McCauley	C	10	1	0	1	0	2
1	Sean Burke†	G	23	0	1	1		4
39	Dan Cloutier	G	24	0	1	1		21
31	Mathieu Garon	G	32	0	1	1		6
22	Jason Ward†‡	RW	7	0	1	1	−1	4
32	Barry Brust	G	11	0	0	0		0
33	Yutaka Fukufuji	G	4	0	0	0		0
37	Gabe Gauthier	LW	5	0	0	0	−1	2
43	Tim Jackman	RW	5	0	0	0	−1	10
33	Jack Johnson	D	5	0	0	0	−5	18
22	Joe Piskula†	D	5	0	0	0	−3	6
22	Shay Stephenson	LW	2	0	0	0	0	0
34 (Note: Tukonen wore number 44 in his first game.)	Lauri Tukonen	RW	4	0	0	0	−2	0

=== Goaltending ===
- † = Joined team via a transaction (e.g., trade, waivers, signing) during the season. Stats reflect time with the Kings only.

No.	Player	Regular season									
No.	Player	GP	W	L	OT	SA	GA	GAA	SV%	SO	TOI
31	Mathieu Garon	32	13	10	6	849	79	2.66	.907	2	1779
1	Sean Burke†	23	6	10	5	687	68	3.12	.901	1	1310
39	Dan Cloutier	24	6	14	2	608	85	3.98	.860	0	1281
32	Barry Brust	11	2	4	1	245	30	3.70	.878	0	486
33	Yutaka Fukufuji	4	0	3	0	43	7	4.37	.837	0	96

== Awards and records ==
=== Awards ===
Type	Award/honor	Recipient	Ref
League (in-season)	NHL All-Star Game selection	Lubomir Visnovsky	
League (in-season)	NHL First Star of the Week	Alexander Frolov (November 19)	
League (in-season)	NHL Second Star of the Week	Alexander Frolov (December 31)	
League (in-season)	NHL YoungStars Game selection	Anze Kopitar	
Team	Ace Bailey Memorial Award	Tom Kostopoulos	
Team	Bill Libby Memorial Award	Michael Cammalleri	
Team	Defensive Player	Derek Armstrong	
Team	Jim Fox Community Service	Derek Armstrong	
Team	Leading Scorer	Michael Cammalleri	
Team	Mark Bavis Memorial Award	Anze Kopitar	
Team	Most Popular Player	Anze Kopitar	
Team	Outstanding Defenseman	Lubomir Visnovsky	
Team	Unsung Hero	Tom Kostopoulos	

=== Milestones ===
Milestone	Player	Date	Ref
First game	Anze Kopitar	October 6, 2006	
First game	Patrick O'Sullivan	October 6, 2006	
First game	Peter Harrold	November 22, 2006	
First game	Barry Brust	November 30, 2006	
First game	Yutaka Fukufuji	January 13, 2007	
First game	John Zeiler	February 17, 2007	
First game	Lauri Tukonen	February 22, 2007	
First game	Shay Stephenson	March 1, 2007	
First game	Gabe Gauthier	March 11, 2007	
First game	Joe Piskula	March 23, 2007	
First game	Jack Johnson	March 29, 2007	
1,000th game played	Rob Blake	November 4, 2006	

== Transactions ==
The Kings were involved in the following transactions from June 20, 2006, the day after the deciding game of the 2006 Stanley Cup Finals, through June 6, 2007, the day of the deciding game of the 2007 Stanley Cup Finals.

=== Trades ===
Date	Details		Ref
June 24, 2006	To Los Angeles Kings: Patrick O'Sullivan; 1st-round pick in 2006	To Minnesota Wild: Pavol Demitra	
June 24, 2006	To Los Angeles Kings: 4th-round pick in 2006; 5th-round pick in 2006	To New York Rangers: 4th-round pick in 2006	
June 24, 2006	To Los Angeles Kings: 7th-round pick in 2007	To Columbus Blue Jackets: 7th-round pick in 2006	
July 5, 2006	To Los Angeles Kings: Dan Cloutier	To Vancouver Canucks: 2nd-round pick in 2007; Conditional draft pick in 2009	
September 29, 2006	To Los Angeles Kings: Oleg Tverdovsky; Rights to Jack Johnson	To Carolina Hurricanes: Eric Belanger; Tim Gleason	
January 20, 2007	To Los Angeles Kings: 4th-round pick in 2008	To Tampa Bay Lightning: Ryan Munce	
January 29, 2007	To Los Angeles Kings: Jamie Lundmark; 4th-round pick in 2007; 2nd-round pick in 2008	To Calgary Flames: Craig Conroy	
February 5, 2007	To Los Angeles Kings: Jason Ward; Rights to Marc-Andre Cliche; Rights to Jan Marek	To New York Rangers: Sean Avery; Rights to John Seymour	
February 26, 2007	To Los Angeles Kings: 2nd-round pick in 2007; 4th-round pick in 2008	To Vancouver Canucks: Brent Sopel	
February 26, 2007	To Los Angeles Kings: 5th-round pick in 2007	To Tampa Bay Lightning: Jason Ward	
February 26, 2007	To Los Angeles Kings: Jamie Heward	To Washington Capitals: Conditional 5th-round pick in 2008	
February 26, 2007	To Los Angeles Kings: Jaroslav Modry; Rights to Johan Fransson; 2nd-round pick in 2007; 3rd-round pick in 2007; 1st-round pick in 2008	To Dallas Stars: Mattias Norstrom; Konstantin Pushkaryov; 3rd-round pick in 2007; 4th-round pick in 2007	

=== Players acquired ===
Date	Player	Former team	Term	Via	Ref
July 1, 2006	Rob Blake	Colorado Avalanche	2-year	Free agency	
July 1, 2006	Scott Thornton	San Jose Sharks	2-year	Free agency	
July 2, 2006	Alyn McCauley	San Jose Sharks	3-year	Free agency	
July 4, 2006	Brian Willsie	Washington Capitals	2-year	Free agency	
July 12, 2006	Gabe Gauthier	University of Denver (WCHA)	2-year	Free agency	
July 10, 2006	Brendan Buckley	St. Louis Blues	2-year	Free agency	
July 10, 2006	Kevin Dallman	St. Louis Blues	2-year	Free agency	
July 13, 2006	Raitis Ivanans	Montreal Canadiens	1-year	Free agency	
September 1, 2006	Matt Moulson	Cornell University (ECAC)	multi-year	Free agency	
November 11, 2006	Marty Murray	Philadelphia Flyers		Waivers	
January 18, 2007	Sean Burke	Tampa Bay Lightning		Waivers	
February 17, 2007	John Zeiler	Manchester Monarchs (AHL)	1-year	Free agency	
March 16, 2007	Kevin Westgarth	Princeton University (ECAC)	3-year	Free agency	
March 21, 2007	Joe Piskula	University of Wisconsin-Madison (WCHA)	3-year	Free agency	
April 27, 2007	Teddy Purcell	University of Maine (HE)	3-year	Free agency	
May 31, 2007	Vladimir Dravecky	HC Kosice (SVK)	3-year	Free agency	
May 31, 2007	Erik Ersberg	HV71 (SHL)	1-year	Free agency	

=== Players lost ===
Date	Player	New team	Via (Note: In parentheses is the player's free agency group on July 1 if applicable.)	Ref
July 1, 2006	Valeri Bure (Note: Bure retired.)		Contract expiration (III)	
July 1, 2006	Joe Corvo	Ottawa Senators	Free agency (III)	
July 1, 2006	Mark Parrish	Minnesota Wild	Free agency (III)	
July 4, 2006	Jeremy Roenick	Phoenix Coyotes	Free agency (III)	
July 9, 2006	Adam Hauser	Kolner Haie (DEL)	Free agency (UFA)	
July 25, 2006	Marty Wilford	Iowa Stars (AHL)	Free agency (III)	
August 7, 2006	Nathan Dempsey	Boston Bruins	Free agency (III)	
August 9, 2006	Connor James	Pittsburgh Penguins	Free agency (UFA)	
August 16, 2006	Brad Fast	SCL Tigers (NLA)	Free agency (UFA)	
August 21, 2006	Ryan Flinn	San Antonio Rampage (AHL)	Free agency (VI)	
October 3, 2006	George Parros	Colorado Avalanche	Waivers	
December 30, 2006	Jeff Cowan	Vancouver Canucks	Waivers	
May 27, 2007	Marty Murray	HC Lugano (NLA)	Free agency	

=== Signings ===
Date	Player	Term	Contract type	Ref
June 30, 2006	Jeff Cowan	1-year	Option exercised	
July 7, 2006	Mike Weaver	1-year	Re-signing	
July 14, 2006	Trevor Lewis	3-year	Entry-level	
July 17, 2006	Mathieu Garon	1-year	Re-signing	
July 17, 2006	Tim Jackman	1-year	Re-signing	
July 19, 2006	Eric Belanger	1-year	Re-signing	
July 24, 2006	Sean Avery	1-year	Re-signing	
July 26, 2006	Michael Cammalleri	1-year	Re-signing	
September 17, 2006	Dustin Brown	2-year	Re-signing	
September 17, 2006	Tim Gleason	2-year	Re-signing	
September 27, 2006	Dan Cloutier	2-year	Extension	
October 13, 2006	Jonathan Bernier	3-year	Entry-level	
February 14, 2007	Derek Armstrong	2-year	Extension	
March 18, 2007	Raitis Ivanans	1-year	Extension	
March 26, 2007	Jack Johnson	3-year	Entry-level	
March 30, 2007	Jonathan Quick	multi-year	Entry-level	
April 9, 2007	Marc-Andre Cliche	3-year	Entry-level	
April 16, 2007	Brian Boyle	2-year	Entry-level	
May 8, 2007	Brady Murray	multi-year	Entry-level	
May 22, 2007	Patrik Hersley	multi-year	Entry-level	

== Draft picks ==
Los Angeles's picks at the 2006 NHL entry draft in Vancouver, British Columbia. The Kings had the 11th overall draft pick by lottery for the third consecutive year.

Round	#	Player	Nationality	NHL team	College/junior/club team (league)
1	11	Jonathan Bernier (G)	Canada	Los Angeles Kings	Lewiston Maineiacs (QMJHL)
1	17	Trevor Lewis (C)	United States	Los Angeles Kings (from Edmonton, via Minnesota)	Des Moines Buccaneers (USHL)
2	48	Joey Ryan (D)	United States	Los Angeles Kings	Quebec Remparts (QMJHL)
3	74	Jeff Zatkoff (G)	United States	Los Angeles Kings	Miami University
3	86	Bud Holloway (C/RW)	Canada	Los Angeles Kings (from Nashville)	Seattle Thunderbirds (WHL)
4	114	Niclas Andersen (D)	Sweden	Los Angeles Kings (from NY Rangers)	Leksands IF (Allsvenskan)
5	134	David Meckler (C)	United States	Los Angeles Kings	Yale University (ECAC)
5	144	Martin Nolet (D)	Canada	Los Angeles Kings (from NY Rangers)	Champlain (QAAAJHL)
6	164	Constantin Braun (LW)	Denmark	Los Angeles Kings	Eisbaren Berlin (Germany)

== See also ==
- 2006–07 NHL season
