= 2006–07 Vancouver Canucks season =

NHL hockey team season

2006–07 Vancouver Canucks
- Northwest Division champions
- Division: 1st Northwest
- Conference: 3rd Western
- 2006–07 record: 49–26–7
- Home record: 26–11–4
- Road record: 23–15–3
- Goals for: 222
- Goals against: 201

Team information
- General manager: Dave Nonis
- Coach: Alain Vigneault
- Captain: Markus Naslund
- Alternate captains: Trevor Linden; Brendan Morrison
- Arena: General Motors Place
- Average attendance: 18,630
- Minor league affiliates: Manitoba Moose; Victoria Salmon Kings

Team leaders
- Goals: Daniel Sedin (36)
- Assists: Henrik Sedin (71)
- Points: Daniel Sedin (84)
- Penalty minutes: Kevin Bieksa (134)
- Plus/minus: Sami Salo (+21)
- Wins: Roberto Luongo (47)
- Goals against average: Roberto Luongo (2.29)

The 2006–07 Vancouver Canucks season was the Canucks' 37th NHL season.

== Season overview ==
The season began on the heels of a blockbuster trade involving goaltender Roberto Luongo and Lukas Krajicek coming to Vancouver in exchange for Todd Bertuzzi, Alex Auld and Bryan Allen. The acquisition of Luongo combined with the salary increases of the Sedin twins meant that the Canucks were too close to salary cap and as a result, saw names such as Ed Jovanovski, Anson Carter, Nolan Baumgartner, Jarkko Ruutu and Wade Brookbank lost to free agency.

In addition to the departures of high-profile players such as Bertuzzi, Jovanovski and Carter, general manager Dave Nonis had fired Marc Crawford as head coach after the 2005–06 season, and replaced him with Alain Vigneault. The team also added players such as Jan Bulis, Taylor Pyatt, Marc Chouinard and Willie Mitchell, players who many thought are not as highly skilled as the ones who had recently departed. Despite the arrival of Luongo, many hockey analysts and fans predicted before the season began that the team would either miss the playoffs, or at best battle for the last playoff spots as 7th or 8th seed in the Western Conference. However, a few did foresee that the addition of a high-calibre goaltender in Luongo would propel the Canucks into the top three of the conference.

Under such skepticism, the team played mediocre hockey from October to the Christmas break, and received criticism due to the team's lack of scoring during this period. However, after the Christmas break, the team had settled down on Vigneault's coaching system, and played stellar hockey from that point on, exceeding the expectations of fans, analysts and critics alike. On April 7, 2007, the Canucks defeated the San Jose Sharks by a score of 4–3 in overtime to clinch the Northwest Division title; their second in the past three seasons. Not only did the team win a division title, this season was known for many milestones, such as Taylor Pyatt setting career high in points, and Alain Vigneault setting a new franchise record for wins as a head coach. Also, second-year player Kevin Bieksa had emerged as a top-four defenceman on the team throughout the season.

On January 9, 2007, the NHL announced that Roberto Luongo had been voted by the fans to start in goal in the 2007 All-Star Game in Dallas. Aside from Luongo's selection into the All-Star Game, the first half of the season was also noted for the "Vote for Rory" internet campaign. The campaign was aimed at getting defenceman Rory Fitzpatrick voted into the 2007 All-Star Game, while mocking the NHL system of internet voting which encouraged people to vote as many times as they liked.

For the first time in franchise history, the Canucks ended the regular season with the league's best penalty killing record, with an 86.9% efficiency.

With the division title and third seed in the conference, the Canucks faced off against the Dallas Stars in the Western Quarterfinals. The Canucks first game back in the playoffs was a long one. On April 11, 2007, the Canucks set a franchise record with a quadruple OT win in Game 1. The game was the longest in Canucks history and the sixth longest in league history. Also in this game the Canucks set a record for shots against, allowing 76. The Canucks won this seven-game series despite the fact that every Dallas victory was a shutout for goalie Marty Turco.

The goal scoring woes continued in the second round against Brian Burke's Anaheim Ducks and the Canucks could not score more than two goals in a game. Although Trevor Linden experienced a resurgence and tied for the team lead for scoring in the playoffs, the Sedin twins could not escape the Ducks' tight checking. The third period of Game 4 was a pivotal point as the Canucks could not protect a 2–0 third-period at home and lost in overtime. In the deciding Game 5 in Anaheim, call-up rookie Jannik Hansen attempted to move the puck from the Canucks' zone, but was caught by a thunderous hit by Rob Niedermayer. The puck then went to his brother Scott, right at the blue line, who fired a wrist shot on net. Roberto Luongo, engaged with a referee over whether the puck had cleared the zone, failed to track the puck, which ended up in the back of the net and ended the Canucks' season.

== Regular season ==
The Canucks finished the regular season with the League's best penalty-kill percentage, at 86.93%.

Northwest Division
No.	CR		GP	W	L	OTL	GF	GA	Pts
1	3	**Vancouver Canucks**	82	49	26	7	222	201	105
2	7	**Minnesota Wild**	82	48	26	8	235	191	104
3	8	**Calgary Flames**	82	43	29	10	258	226	96
4	9	Colorado Avalanche	82	44	31	7	272	251	95
5	12	Edmonton Oilers	82	32	43	7	195	248	71

Note: CR = Conference rank; GP = Games played; W = Wins; L = Losses; T = Ties; OTL = Overtime/shootout loss; GF = Goals for; GA = Goals against; PIM = Penalties in minutes; Pts = Points
Bolded teams qualified for the playoffs.

Western Conference
R		Div	GP	W	L	OTL	GF	GA	Pts
**1**	**z-Detroit Red Wings**	**CE**	**82**	**50**	**19**	**13**	**254**	**199**	**113**
**2**	**y-Anaheim Ducks**	**PA**	**82**	**48**	**20**	**14**	**258**	**208**	**110**
**3**	**y-Vancouver Canucks**	**NW**	**82**	**49**	**26**	**7**	**222**	**201**	**105**
**4**	**Nashville Predators**	**CE**	**82**	**51**	**23**	**8**	**272**	**212**	**110**
**5**	**San Jose Sharks**	**PA**	**82**	**51**	**26**	**5**	**258**	**199**	**107**
**6**	**Dallas Stars**	**PA**	**82**	**50**	**25**	**7**	**226**	**197**	**107**
**7**	**Minnesota Wild**	**NW**	**82**	**48**	**26**	**8**	**235**	**191**	**104**
**8**	**Calgary Flames**	**NW**	**82**	**43**	**29**	**10**	**258**	**226**	**96**
8.5
9	Colorado Avalanche	NW	82	44	31	7	272	251	95
10	St. Louis Blues	CE	82	34	35	13	214	254	81
11	Columbus Blue Jackets	CE	82	33	42	7	201	249	73
12	Edmonton Oilers	NW	82	32	43	7	195	248	71
13	Chicago Blackhawks	CE	82	31	42	9	201	258	71
14	Los Angeles Kings	PA	82	27	41	14	227	283	68
15	Phoenix Coyotes	PA	82	31	46	5	216	284	67

bold - qualified for playoffs, y - division title, z - best conference record
CE - Central Division, NW - Northwest Division, PA - Pacific Division

== Playoffs ==
The Vancouver Canucks ended the 2006–07 regular season as the Western Conference's third seed.

== Schedule and results ==
=== Regular season ===
2006–07 regular season
October: 7–5–1 (home: 2–2–0; road: 5–3–1)

Game	Date	Visitor	Score	Home	OT	Decision	Attendance	Record	Points	Recap
1	October 5	Vancouver	3 – 1	Detroit		Luongo	20,066	1–0–0	2	W
2	October 6	Vancouver	3 – 2	Columbus	OT	Luongo	18,136	2–0–0	4	W
3	October 8	Vancouver	2 – 3	Colorado		Luongo	18,007	2–1–0	4	L
4	October 10	Vancouver	1 – 2	Minnesota	SO	Luongo	18,064	2–1–1	5	OTL
5	October 13	San Jose	6 – 4	Vancouver		Luongo	18,630	2–2–1	5	L
6	October 16	Edmonton	1 – 2	Vancouver		Luongo	18,630	3–2–1	7	W
7	October 17	Vancouver	1 – 2	Edmonton		Sabourin	16,839	3–3–1	7	L
8	October 20	Vancouver	3 – 2	St. Louis	OT	Luongo	9,049	4–3–1	9	W
9	October 21	Vancouver	4 – 3	Nashville	OT	Luongo	16,073	5–3–1	11	W
10	October 23	Vancouver	1 – 2	Dallas		Luongo	16,639	5–4–1	11	L
11	October 25	Vancouver	5 – 0	Chicago		Luongo	11,641	6–4–1	13	W
12	October 27	Washington	2 – 3	Vancouver	SO	Luongo	18,630	7–4–1	15	W
13	October 31	Nashville	3 – 2	Vancouver		Luongo	18,630	7–5–1	15	L

November: 5–8–0 (home: 4–4–0; road: 1–4–0)

Game	Date	Visitor	Score	Home	OT	Decision	Attendance	Record	Points	Recap
14	November 2	Vancouver	2 – 5	Minnesota		Luongo	18,568	7–6–1	15	L
15	November 4	Vancouver	2 – 3	Colorado		Luongo	18,007	7–7–1	15	L
16	November 6	Dallas	1 – 2	Vancouver		Luongo	18,630	8–7–1	17	W
17	November 9	Anaheim	6 – 0	Vancouver		Luongo	18,630	8–8–1	17	L
18	November 11	Calgary	3 – 2	Vancouver		Luongo	18,630	8–9–1	17	L
19	November 14	Detroit	3 – 2	Vancouver		Luongo	18,630	8–10–1	17	L
20	November 17	St. Louis	2 – 4	Vancouver		Luongo	18,630	9–10–1	19	W
21	November 19	Chicago	1 – 2	Vancouver		Luongo	18,630	10–10–1	21	W
22	November 22	Vancouver	4 – 3	Detroit	OT	Luongo	20,066	11–10–1	23	W
23	November 23	Vancouver	0 – 6	Nashville		Sabourin	15,396	11–11–1	23	L
24	November 25	Vancouver	1 – 4	Colorado		Luongo	17,825	11–12–1	23	L
25	November 28	Columbus	0 – 1	Vancouver		Luongo	18,630	12–12–1	25	W
26	November 30	Anaheim	2 – 1	Vancouver		Luongo	18,630	12–13–1	25	L

December: 8–5–0 (home: 6–1–0; road: 2–4–0)

Game	Date	Visitor	Score	Home	OT	Decision	Attendance	Record	Points	Recap
27	December 2	Colorado	1 – 2	Vancouver		Luongo	18,630	13–13–1	27	W
28	December 4	Edmonton	4 – 0	Vancouver		Luongo	18,630	13–14–1	27	L
29	December 8	Carolina	3 – 4	Vancouver	OT	Luongo	18,630	14–14–1	29	W
30	December 9	Vancouver	3 – 5	Calgary		Luongo	19,289	14–15–1	29	L
31	December 12	Phoenix	2 – 5	Vancouver		Luongo	18,630	15–15–1	31	W
32	December 14	Calgary	1 – 3	Vancouver		Luongo	18,630	16–15–1	33	W
33	December 16	Minnesota	1 – 2	Vancouver		Luongo	18,630	17–15–1	35	W
34	December 19	Vancouver	2 – 5	Minnesota		Luongo	18,568	17–16–1	35	L
35	December 21	Vancouver	0 – 2	Boston		Sabourin	12,348	17–17–1	35	L
36	December 22	Vancouver	2 – 3	Columbus		Luongo	15,861	17–18–1	35	L
37	December 26	Vancouver	3 – 1	Calgary		Luongo	19,289	18–18–1	37	W
38	December 27	Calgary	5 – 6	Vancouver	OT	Luongo	18,630	19–18–1	39	W
39	December 30	Vancouver	6 – 2	Edmonton		Luongo	16,839	20–18–1	41	W

January: 8–1–3 (home: 4–1–2; road: 4–0–1)

Game	Date	Visitor	Score	Home	OT	Decision	Attendance	Record	Points	Recap
40	January 2	Vancouver	3 – 2	Calgary		Luongo	19,289	21–18–1	43	W
41	January 3	Dallas	1 – 2	Vancouver	SO	Luongo	18,630	22–18–1	45	W
42	January 5	Edmonton	2 – 3	Vancouver	OT	Luongo	18,630	23–18–1	47	W
43	January 7	Florida	3 – 4	Vancouver	SO	Luongo	18,630	24–18–1	49	W
44	January 11	Minnesota	5 – 2	Vancouver		Luongo	18,630	24–19–1	49	L
45	January 13	Vancouver	6 – 1	Toronto		Luongo	19,608	25–19–1	51	W
46	January 16	Vancouver	4 – 0	Montreal		Luongo	21,273	26–19–1	53	W
47	January 18	Vancouver	2 – 1	Ottawa		Luongo	19,161	27–19–1	55	W
48	January 19	Vancouver	3 – 4	Buffalo	SO	Sabourin	18,690	27–19–2	56	OTL
49	January 26	Los Angeles	3 – 2	Vancouver	OT	Luongo	18,630	27–19–3	57	OTL
50	January 28	San Jose	1 – 3	Vancouver		Luongo	18,630	28–19–3	59	W
51	January 30	Columbus	3 – 2	Vancouver	SO	Luongo	18,630	28–19–4	60	OTL

February: 8–3–1 (home: 3–1–0; road: 5–2–1)

Game	Date	Visitor	Score	Home	OT	Decision	Attendance	Record	Points	Recap
52	February 1	Edmonton	3 – 5	Vancouver		Luongo	18,630	29–19–4	62	W
53	February 3	Vancouver	3 – 4	Calgary		Luongo	19,289	29–20–4	62	L
54	February 6	Vancouver	5 – 2	Edmonton		Luongo	16,839	30–20–4	64	W
55	February 7	Chicago	3 – 0	Vancouver		Luongo	18,630	30–21–4	64	L
56	February 10	Atlanta	2 – 3	Vancouver		Luongo	18,630	31–21–4	66	W
57	February 14	Vancouver	3 – 2	Minnesota	OT	Luongo	18,568	32–21–4	68	W
58	February 16	Vancouver	2 – 1	Chicago	SO	Luongo	14,552	33–21–4	70	W
59	February 18	Colorado	4 – 5	Vancouver		Luongo	18,630	34–21–4	72	W
60	February 20	Vancouver	3 – 2	Anaheim	OT	Sabourin	17,467	35–21–4	74	W
61	February 22	Vancouver	3 – 2	Los Angeles		Luongo	17,737	36–21–4	76	W
62	February 25	Vancouver	1 – 2	Dallas	OT	Luongo	17,712	36–21–5	77	OTL
63	February 27	Vancouver	1 – 3	St. Louis		Luongo	10,411	36–22–5	77	L

March: 11–2–2 (home: 6–1–2; road: 5–1–0)

Game	Date	Visitor	Score	Home	OT	Decision	Attendance	Record	Points	Recap
64	March 1	Phoenix	3 – 4	Vancouver		Luongo	18,630	37–22–5	79	W
65	March 4	Minnesota	3 – 4	Vancouver	SO	Luongo	18,630	38–22–5	81	W
66	March 6	Tampa Bay	1 – 5	Vancouver		Luongo	18,630	39–22–5	83	W
67	March 8	Vancouver	4 – 2	Phoenix		Sabourin	13,841	40–22–5	85	W
68	March 9	Vancouver	2 – 1	San Jose	OT	Luongo	17,496	41–22–5	87	W
69	March 11	Vancouver	2 – 4	Anaheim		Luongo	17,174	41–23–5	87	L
70	March 13	Minnesota	3 – 2	Vancouver	OT	Luongo	18,630	41–23–6	88	OTL
71	March 15	St. Louis	2 – 3	Vancouver	OT	Luongo	18,630	42–23–6	90	W
72	March 17	Detroit	1 – 4	Vancouver		Luongo	18,630	43–23–6	92	W
73	March 19	Vancouver	2 – 1	Edmonton		Luongo	16,839	44–23–6	94	W
74	March 21	Nashville	0 – 2	Vancouver		Luongo	18,630	45–23–6	96	W
75	March 25	Colorado	5 – 4	Vancouver	SO	Luongo	18,630	45–23–7	97	OTL
76	March 27	Vancouver	3 – 0	Colorado		Luongo	17,437	46–23–7	99	W
77	March 29	Vancouver	4 – 2	Los Angeles		Luongo	17,916	47–23–7	101	W
78	March 31	Calgary	3 – 2	Vancouver		Luongo	18,630	47–24–7	101	L

April: 2–2–0 (home: 1–1–0; road: 1–1–0)

Game	Date	Visitor	Score	Home	OT	Decision	Attendance	Record	Points	Recap
79	April 3	Los Angeles	2 – 4	Vancouver		Luongo	18,630	48–24–7	103	W
80	April 5	Colorado	3 – 1	Vancouver		Luongo	18,630	48–25–7	103	L
81	April 7	Vancouver	4 – 3	San Jose	OT	Luongo	17,496	49–25–7	105	W
82	April 8	Vancouver	1 – 3	Phoenix		Sabourin	17,406	49–26–7	105	L

Legend: W Win (2 points) L Loss (0 points) OTL Overtime/shootout loss (1 point)

=== Playoffs ===
2007 Stanley Cup playoffs
Western Conference Quarterfinals vs. (6) Dallas Stars: Vancouver won 4–3

Game	Date	Visitor	Score	Home	OT	Decision	Attendance	Series	Recap
1	April 11	Dallas	4 – 5	Vancouver	4OT	Luongo	18,630	1 – 0	W
2	April 13	Dallas	2 – 0	Vancouver		Luongo	18,630	1 – 1	L
3	April 15	Vancouver	2 – 1	Dallas	1OT	Luongo	18,532	2 – 1	W
4	April 17	Vancouver	2 – 1	Dallas		Luongo	18,532	3 – 1	W
5	April 19	Dallas	1 – 0	Vancouver	1OT	Luongo	18,630	3 – 2	L
6	April 21	Vancouver	0 – 2	Dallas		Luongo	18,600	3 – 3	L
7	April 23	Dallas	1 – 4	Vancouver		Luongo	18,630	4 – 3	W

Western Conference Semifinals vs. (2) Anaheim Ducks: Anaheim won 4–1

Game	Date	Visitor	Score	Home	OT	Decision	Attendance	Series	Recap
1	April 25	Vancouver	1 – 5	Anaheim		Luongo	17,250	0 – 1	L
2	April 27	Vancouver	2 – 1	Anaheim	2OT	Luongo	17,392	1 – 1	W
3	April 29	Anaheim	3 – 2	Vancouver		Luongo	18,630	1 – 2	L
4	May 1	Anaheim	3 – 2	Vancouver	1OT	Luongo	18,630	1 – 3	L
5	May 3	Vancouver	1 – 2	Anaheim	2OT	Luongo	17,407	1 – 4	L

Legend: W Win L Loss

== Player statistics ==
=== Scoring ===
- Position abbreviations: C = Centre; D = Defence; G = Goaltender; LW = Left wing; RW = Right wing
- † = Joined team via a transaction (e.g., trade, waivers, signing) during the season. Stats reflect time with the Canucks only.

No.	Player	Pos	Regular season						Playoffs					
No.	Player	Pos	GP	G	A	Pts	+/-	PIM	GP	G	A	Pts	+/-	PIM
22	Daniel Sedin	LW	81	36	48	84	19	36	12	2	3	5	−5	4
33	Henrik Sedin	C	82	10	71	81	19	66	12	2	2	4	−8	14
19	Markus Naslund	RW	82	24	36	60	3	54	12	4	1	5	−1	16
7	Brendan Morrison	C	82	20	31	51	−9	60	12	1	3	4	4	6
3	Kevin Bieksa	D	81	12	30	42	1	134	9	0	0	0	−1	20
9	Taylor Pyatt	LW	76	23	14	37	5	42	12	2	4	6	−2	6
6	Sami Salo	D	67	14	23	37	21	26	10	0	1	1	0	4
2	Mattias Ohlund	D	77	11	20	31	−3	80	12	2	5	7	3	12
24	Matt Cooke	LW	81	10	20	30	0	64	1	0	0	0	0	2
16	Trevor Linden	C	80	12	13	25	−6	34	12	2	5	7	4	6
38	Jan Bulis	C	79	12	11	23	−8	70	12	1	1	2	0	2
17	Ryan Kesler	C	48	6	10	16	1	40	1	0	0	0	0	0
5	Lukas Krajicek	D	78	3	13	16	−4	64	12	0	2	2	−2	12
8	Willie Mitchell	D	62	1	10	11	1	45	12	0	1	1	−2	12
20	Jeff Cowan†	LW	42	7	3	10	4	93	10	2	0	2	1	22
14	Alexandre Burrows	LW	81	3	6	9	−7	93	11	1	0	1	0	14
21	Bryan Smolinski†	C	20	4	3	7	−3	8	12	2	2	4	2	8
25	Josh Green	C	57	2	5	7	0	25	9	0	1	1	1	12
18	Rory Fitzpatrick	D	58	1	6	7	12	46	3	0	0	0	−1	6
26	Tommi Santala	C	30	1	5	6	0	24	1	0	0	0	0	0
4	Brent Sopel†	D	20	1	4	5	0	10	11	0	0	0	1	2
32	Marc Chouinard	C	42	2	2	4	−2	10	—	—	—	—	—	—
23	Alexander Edler	D	22	1	2	3	3	6	3	0	0	0	0	2
28	Yannick Tremblay	D	12	1	2	3	−6	12	—	—	—	—	—	—
1	Roberto Luongo	G	76	0	2	2		10	12	0	0	0		0
29	Patrick Coulombe†	D	7	0	1	1	−6	4	—	—	—	—	—	—
39	Brad Moran	C	3	0	1	1	0	2	—	—	—	—	—	—
21	Tyler Bouck	LW	6	0	0	0	−1	16	—	—	—	—	—	—
4	Luc Bourdon	D	9	0	0	0	−1	4	—	—	—	—	—	—
27	Lee Goren	RW	2	0	0	0	−1	0	—	—	—	—	—	—
45	Nathan McIver	D	1	0	0	0	−3	7	—	—	—	—	—	—
37	Brandon Reid	C	3	0	0	0	−1	0	1	0	1	1	1	0
15	Rick Rypien	C	2	0	0	0	0	5	—	—	—	—	—	—
35	Dany Sabourin	G	9	0	0	0		0	2	0	0	0		0
20	Jesse Schultz	RW	2	0	0	0	0	0	—	—	—	—	—	—
29	Nathan Smith	C	1	0	0	0	0	0	4	0	0	0	0	0
36	Jannik Hansen	LW	—	—	—	—	—	—	10	0	1	1	0	4

=== Goaltending ===
No.	Player	Regular season										Playoffs								
No.	Player	GP	W	L	OT	SA	GA	GAA	SV%	SO	TOI	GP	W	L	SA	GA	GAA	SV%	SO	TOI
1	Roberto Luongo	76	47	22	6	2169	171	2.28	.921	5	4490	12	5	7	427	25	1.77	.941	0	847
35	Dany Sabourin	9	2	4	1	224	21	2.63	.906	0	480	2	0	0	11	1	4.14	.909	0	14

== Awards and records ==
=== Awards ===
Type	Award/honour	Recipient	Ref
League (annual)	Jack Adams Award	Alain Vigneault	
League (annual)	NHL Second All-Star Team	Roberto Luongo (Goaltender)	
League (in-season)	NHL All-Star Game selection	Roberto Luongo (Note: Luongo was voted to the starting lineup.)	
League (in-season)	NHL First Star of the Week	Roberto Luongo (January 7)	
League (in-season)	NHL Third Star of the Month	Roberto Luongo (January)	
League (in-season)	NHL Third Star of the Week	Daniel Sedin (December 31)	
Team	Babe Pratt Trophy	Kevin Bieksa	
Team	Cyclone Taylor Trophy	Roberto Luongo	
Team	Cyrus H. McLean Trophy	Daniel Sedin	
Team	Fred J. Hume Award	Kevin Bieksa	
Team	Molson Cup	Roberto Luongo	
Team	Most Exciting Player Award	Roberto Luongo	

=== Milestones ===
==== Roberto Luongo ====
- Was voted in by the fans to represent the Western Conference at the 2007 All-Star Game in Dallas, as the starting goaltender on January 9, 2007. In addition, Luongo won the goaltenders' competition at the All-Star Skills Competition by allowing the fewest goals-against for the In The Zone and Shootout events on January 23, 2007.
- Earned his 39th victory on March 9, 2007, at San Jose. With the win, Luongo broke the franchise single-season win record of 38, which was set by Kirk McLean in the 1991–92 NHL season.
- Played in his 73rd game this season on March 31, 2007, vs. Calgary. By playing that game Luongo broke the franchise single-season games played record, which was held by Gary Smith in the 1974–75 NHL season.
- Named on the NHL Second All-Star Team on June 14, 2007.
- Was the Monthly Award winner of the Mark Messier Leadership Award on March 21, 2007.
- Nominated for the Vezina Trophy, but lost to Martin Brodeur on June 14, 2007.
- Nominated for the Lester B. Pearson Award, but lost to Sidney Crosby on June 14, 2007.
- Nominated for the Hart Memorial Trophy, but lost to Sidney Crosby on June 14, 2007.

==== Daniel Sedin ====
- Played in his 400th career NHL and Canuck game on October 8, 2006, at Colorado.
- Registered his 100th career NHL and Canuck goal on January 13, 2007, at Toronto. With the goal, Sedin became the sixth most prolific scoring left winger in Canucks history with 237 points.
- Scored the OT game-winner on March 15, 2007, vs. St. Louis, tying an NHL record with his fourth this season.
- Got a goal and an assist on March 27, 2007, at Colorado, to register his 300th career NHL and Canuck point.

==== Henrik Sedin ====
- Recorded one assist on February 1, 2007, vs. Edmonton. With the assist, Sedin recorded his 200th career NHL and Canuck assist.
- Recorded three assists on March 25, 2007, vs. Colorado, to break the franchise single-season assists record with 63. The previous record was 62, set by Andre Boudrias in the 1974–75 NHL season.
- Recorded two assists on April 3, 2007, vs. Los Angeles, to earn his 300th and 301st career NHL and Canuck points.
- Scored the game-winning goal in Game 1 vs. Dallas ending the longest overtime game in team history and the 6th longest in NHL history on April 11, 2007. He was set up by his brother Daniel and Mattias Ohlund.

==== Trevor Linden ====
- Scored his 300th career goal as a Canuck on October 6, 2006, at Detroit.
- Got an assist, to earn his 400th career assist and his 700th career point as a Canuck on November 14, 2006, vs. Detroit.
- Played his 1,300th career NHL game on February 18, 2007, at Colorado.
- Scored his 12th goal on March 19, 2007, at Edmonton to record his 367th career NHL goal to surpass Jacques Lemaire (366) as the 97th all-time goal scorer in league history.

==== Markus Naslund ====
- Became the all-time franchise goal scoring leader with 301 goals on October 17, 2006, at Edmonton.
- Played his 900th career NHL game on December 8, 2006, vs. Carolina.
- Registered his 103rd power play goal as a Canuck to become the all-time franchise leader in power play goals on February 14, 2007, at Minnesota.

==== Brendan Morrison ====
- Earned his 400th career NHL point with an assist on October 13, 2006, vs. San Jose.
- On November 22, 2006, at Detroit, Morrison scored the overtime winner to become the franchise leader in overtime goals.
- Played his 600th career NHL game on January 18, 2007, at Ottawa.
- Sets a new franchise "Ironman" record playing his 483rd consecutive game on February 22, 2007, at Los Angeles, breaking the record that was previously held by Trevor Linden. On February 25, he became the NHL's active leader with 492 games. Finished the season with 512 consecutive games.

==== Alain Vigneault ====
- Recorded 36 wins as head coach of the Canucks on February 22, 2007, at Los Angeles. With the win, Vigneault recorded the most wins by a Vancouver Canucks head coach during his first year behind the bench.
- On March 29, 2007, set a new franchise record for wins in a season with his 47th victory at Los Angeles. The record was previously held by coach Pat Quinn and was set in the 1992–93 NHL season.
- Won the Jack Adams Award for Coach of the Year on June 14, 2007.

==== Others ====
- Luc Bourdon played in his first NHL game on October 10, 2006, at Minnesota.
- Taylor Pyatt earned his 100th career NHL point on an even-strength goal on October 16, 2006, vs. Edmonton.
- Lukas Krajicek played in his 100th career NHL game on October 23, 2006, at Dallas.
- Alexander Edler played in his first NHL game on November 4, 2006, at Colorado.
- Patrick Coulombe and Nathan McIver played in their first NHL game on November 9, 2006, vs. Anaheim.
- Sami Salo recorded his 100th career NHL point on November 11, 2006, vs. Calgary.
- Jesse Schultz played in his first NHL game on November 28, 2006, vs. Columbus.
- Mattias Ohlund played in his 600th career NHL game as a Canuck game on January 5, 2007, vs. Edmonton.
- Matt Cooke earned his 100th career NHL point as a Canuck on an assist on February 14, 2007, at Minnesota.
- Jannik Hansen played in his first NHL game on April 13, 2007, vs. Dallas.

== Transactions ==
The Canucks were involved in the following transactions from June 20, 2006, the day after the deciding game of the 2006 Stanley Cup Finals, through June 6, 2007, the day of the deciding game of the 2007 Stanley Cup Finals.

=== Trades ===
Date	Details		Ref
June 24, 2006	To Vancouver Canucks: Lukas Krajicek; Roberto Luongo; 6th-round pick in 2006	To Florida Panthers: Bryan Allen; Alex Auld; Todd Bertuzzi	
July 5, 2006	To Vancouver Canucks: 2nd-round pick in 2007; Conditional draft pick in 2009	To Los Angeles Kings: Dan Cloutier	
July 14, 2006	To Vancouver Canucks: Taylor Pyatt	To Buffalo Sabres: 4th-round pick in 2007	
September 12, 2006	To Vancouver Canucks: Drew MacIntyre	To Detroit Red Wings: Conditional draft pick in 2007	
January 24, 2007	To Vancouver Canucks: Colby Genoway	To Anaheim Ducks: Joe Rullier	
February 26, 2007	To Vancouver Canucks: Bryan Smolinski	To Chicago Blackhawks: Conditional 2nd-round pick in 2007	
February 26, 2007	To Vancouver Canucks: Brent Sopel	To Los Angeles Kings: 2nd-round pick in 2007 or 2008; 4th-round pick in 2008	

=== Players acquired ===
Date	Player	Former team	Term	Via	Ref
July 1, 2006	Willie Mitchell	Dallas Stars	4-year	Free agency	
July 20, 2006	Marc Chouinard	Minnesota Wild	2-year	Free agency	
July 24, 2006	Shaun Heshka	Everett Silvertips (WHL)		Free agency	
July 24, 2006	Joe Rullier	New York Rangers		Free agency	
July 25, 2006	Jan Bulis	Montreal Canadiens	1-year	Free agency	
July 28, 2006	Yannick Tremblay	Adler Mannheim (DEL)	1-year	Free agency	
August 18, 2006	Rory Fitzpatrick	Buffalo Sabres		Free agency	
October 4, 2006	Dany Sabourin	Pittsburgh Penguins		Waivers	
November 3, 2006	Patrick Coulombe	Manitoba Moose (AHL)	3-year	Free agency	
December 30, 2006	Jeff Cowan	Los Angeles Kings		Waivers	

=== Players lost ===
Date	Player	New team	Via (Note: In parentheses is the player's free agency group on July 1 if applicable.)	Ref
July 1, 2006	Nolan Baumgartner	Philadelphia Flyers	Free agency (III)	
July 1, 2006	Keith Carney	Minnesota Wild	Free agency (III)	
July 1, 2006	Ed Jovanovski	Phoenix Coyotes	Free agency (III)	
July 4, 2006	Jarkko Ruutu	Pittsburgh Penguins	Free agency (III)	
July 21, 2006	Wade Brookbank	Boston Bruins	Free agency (UFA)	
July 24, 2006	Jozef Balej	HC Fribourg-Gotteron (NLA)	Free agency (II) (Note: Vancouver retained Balej's NHL rights and re-signed him on August 1, 2007.)	
July 28, 2006	Sean Brown	DEG Metro Stars (DEL)	Free agency (III)	
July 29, 2006	Craig Darby	Augsburger Panther (DEL)	Free agency (III)	
August 4, 2006	Mika Noronen	Ak Bars Kazan (RSL)	Free agency (II) (Note: Vancouver retained Noronen's NHL rights through the 2006–07 season.)	
August 7, 2006	Eric Weinrich		Retirement (III) (Note: Weinrich was hired as an assistant coach for the Portland Pirates of the American Hockey League. On January 25, 2007, he came out of retirement to play for Portland.)	
September 13, 2006	Anson Carter	Columbus Blue Jackets	Free agency (III)	
September 13, 2006	Jason King	Skelleftea AIK (SHL)	Free agency (II) (Note: Vancouver retained King's NHL rights until trading them to the Anaheim Ducks on June 23, 2007.)	
October 2, 2006	Richard Park	New York Islanders	Free agency (III)	
October 3, 2006	Rob McVicar	Utah Grizzlies (ECHL)	Free agency (UFA)	
November 15, 2006	Jason Doig	Traktor Chelyabinsk (RSL)	Free agency (III)	
February 1, 2007	Maxime Ouellet	Kassel Huskies (ESBG)	Free agency (VI)	
May 29, 2007	Brandon Reid	DEG Metro Stars (DEL)	Free agency	

=== Signings ===
Date	Player	Term	Contract type	Ref
June 29, 2006	Roberto Luongo	4-year	Re-signing	
June 30, 2006	Daniel Sedin	3-year	Re-signing	
June 30, 2006	Henrik Sedin	3-year	Re-signing	
July 3, 2006	Wade Flaherty	1-year	Re-signing	
July 16, 2006	Daniel Rahimi		Entry-level	
July 24, 2006	Alexander Edler		Entry-level	
July 24, 2006	Lee Goren		Re-signing	
July 24, 2006	Jannik Hansen		Entry-level	
August 17, 2006	Kevin Bieksa		Re-signing	
August 17, 2006	Tyler Bouck		Re-signing	
August 19, 2006	Prestin Ryan		Re-signing	
August 19, 2006	Jesse Schultz		Re-signing	
September 8, 2006	Alex Burrows	3-year	Re-signing	
September 8, 2006	Lukas Krajicek	1-year	Re-signing	
September 11, 2006	Trevor Linden	1-year	Re-signing	
September 14, 2006	Ryan Kesler	1-year	Re-signing	
September 16, 2006	Josh Green	1-year	Re-signing	
March 27, 2007	Mason Raymond		Entry-level	
March 29, 2007	Sami Salo	4-year	Extension	
May 24, 2007	Ryan Kesler	3-year	Extension	
May 30, 2007	Mario Bliznak		Entry-level	
June 4, 2007	Taylor Pyatt	2-year	Extension	

== Draft picks ==
Vancouver's picks at the 2006 NHL entry draft in Vancouver, British Columbia.

Round	#	Player	Nationality	NHL team	College/junior/club team (league)
1	14	Michael Grabner (RW)	Austria	Vancouver Canucks	Spokane Chiefs (WHL)
3	82	Daniel Rahimi (D)	Sweden	Vancouver Canucks (from Anaheim)	IF Björklöven (Swe Jr.)
6	163	Sergei Shirokov (W)	Russia	Vancouver Canucks (from Florida)	HC CSKA Moscow (Russian Superleague)
6	167	Juraj Simek (LW)	Slovakia	Vancouver Canucks	Kloten Flyers (Nationalliga A)
7	197	Evan Fuller (RW)	Canada	Vancouver Canucks	Prince George Cougars (WHL)

== Farm teams ==
=== Manitoba Moose ===
AHL affiliate that is based in Winnipeg, Manitoba and their home arena is the MTS Centre. The team has been affiliated with the Vancouver Canucks since the 2000–01 AHL season. In the 2006–07 AHL season, Manitoba finished in 1st place in the North Division, it was the franchises first regular season divisional championship in history. In addition, Mike Keane won the Fred T. Hunt Memorial Award for Sportsmanship, Perseverance and overall dedication to hockey. In the playoffs, the Manitoba Moose defeated the Grand Rapids Griffins, 4 games to 3, in the first round. However, Manitoba would eventually be eliminated by the Hamilton Bulldogs, 4 games to 2, in the second round of the playoffs.

=== Victoria Salmon Kings ===
ECHL affiliate that is based in Victoria, British Columbia and their home arena is the Save-On-Foods Memorial Centre. This is the first year that the franchise has been affiliated with the Vancouver Canucks in its three-year existence. In the 2006–07 ECHL season, the Salmon Kings established their first winning record by going on a nine-game winning streak to end the regular season. The Salmon Kings finished 7th overall in the National Conference and made their first playoff appearance against the Alaska Aces in the National Quarterfinal. The Salmon Kings would win Game 1 by a score of 3–2, however, the Aces would win 4 of the next 5 games to win the series 4–2, eliminating Salmon Kings from the playoffs.

== See also ==
- 2006–07 NHL season
