= 2006–07 Nashville Predators season =

Professional ice hockey team season

2006–07 Nashville Predators
- Division: 2nd Central
- Conference: 4th Western
- 2006–07 record: 51–23–8
- Home record: 28–8–5
- Road record: 23–15–3
- Goals for: 272
- Goals against: 212

Team information
- General manager: David Poile
- Coach: Barry Trotz
- Captain: Kimmo Timonen
- Alternate captains: Paul Kariya; Steve Sullivan
- Arena: Nashville Arena
- Average attendance: 15,259
- Minor league affiliates: Milwaukee Admirals; New Mexico Scorpions

Team leaders
- Goals: Jason Arnott and Jean-Pierre Dumont (27)
- Assists: Paul Kariya (52)
- Points: Paul Kariya (76)
- Penalty minutes: Jordin Tootoo (104)
- Plus/minus: David Legwand (+23)
- Wins: Tomas Vokoun (27)
- Goals against average: Chris Mason (2.38)

The 2006–07 Nashville Predators season was the ninth National Hockey League season in Nashville, Tennessee.

The Predators, looking to get past the first round of the Stanley Cup playoffs for the first time in franchise history, bulked up their roster by signing star forward Jason Arnott, whose 76 points in 2005–06 was second on the Dallas Stars. With returning forwards Paul Kariya and Steve Sullivan, and the acquisition of Arnott and Jean-Pierre Dumont, the Predators were predicted to challenge the Detroit Red Wings for top spot in the Central Division.

Although the Predators were leading the Central when the 55th National Hockey League All-Star Game was played in Dallas, Texas, only one Predator player was named to the Western Conference team, defenseman and team captain Kimmo Timonen, who played in his second All-Star Game. Head Coach Barry Trotz served as an assistant coach for the Western Conference.

The attendance in Nashville had been a topic of much media debate all season long, with the Predators' attendance being in the bottom third of the league despite the team leading its division for most of the season. There had been much speculation in February about a clause in the Predators lease with the city that could force the city of Nashville to buy $2 million worth of tickets for the Predators in the 2007–08 season if the team failed to reach a paid average attendance of 14,000. After 21 home games, the Predators were only averaging 12,766 in paid attendance. Team owner Craig Leipold had also announced that he was looking to sell up to 40% of the team to local interests; however, he found no immediate takers.

In February, the Predators acquired forward Peter Forsberg from the Philadelphia Flyers for Scottie Upshall, Ryan Parent and two draft picks. The deal paid immediate dividends at the gate: the Predators announced they had sold 3,500 tickets for their games in the first day after the trade was announced.

The Predators finished the season with a franchise-record 110 points, with 51 wins, and earned a fourth place seed in the Western Conference quarterfinals in the 2007 Stanley Cup playoffs. They then lost to the San Jose Sharks in five games in the quarterfinals.

On May 23, 2007, Craig Leipold was reported to have reached a tentative agreement to sell the team to Research In Motion Chairman and Co-CEO Jim Balsillie. According to Leipold, the team were likely to play the 2007–08 season in Nashville, but the future of the team after that had not been clear. Balsillie had been rumored to be interested in placing another team in Southern Ontario. The sale was later not approved, and the Predators stayed in their city.

== Regular season ==
The Predators finished the regular season having allowed the fewest shorthanded goals, with two.

=== Season standings ===
Central Division
No.	CR		GP	W	L	OTL	GF	GA	Pts
1	1	**Detroit Red Wings**	82	50	19	13	254	199	113
2	4	**Nashville Predators**	82	51	23	8	272	212	110
3	10	St. Louis Blues	82	34	35	13	214	254	81
4	11	Columbus Blue Jackets	82	33	42	7	201	249	73
5	13	Chicago Blackhawks	82	31	42	9	201	258	71

Note: CR = Conference rank; GP = Games played; W = Wins; L = Losses; T = Ties; OTL = Overtime/shootout loss; GF = Goals for; GA = Goals against; PIM = Penalties in minutes; Pts = Points
Bolded teams qualified for the playoffs.

Western Conference
R		Div	GP	W	L	OTL	GF	GA	Pts
**1**	**z-Detroit Red Wings**	**CE**	**82**	**50**	**19**	**13**	**254**	**199**	**113**
**2**	**y-Anaheim Ducks**	**PA**	**82**	**48**	**20**	**14**	**258**	**208**	**110**
**3**	**y-Vancouver Canucks**	**NW**	**82**	**49**	**26**	**7**	**222**	**201**	**105**
**4**	**Nashville Predators**	**CE**	**82**	**51**	**23**	**8**	**272**	**212**	**110**
**5**	**San Jose Sharks**	**PA**	**82**	**51**	**26**	**5**	**258**	**199**	**107**
**6**	**Dallas Stars**	**PA**	**82**	**50**	**25**	**7**	**226**	**197**	**107**
**7**	**Minnesota Wild**	**NW**	**82**	**48**	**26**	**8**	**235**	**191**	**104**
**8**	**Calgary Flames**	**NW**	**82**	**43**	**29**	**10**	**258**	**226**	**96**
8.5
9	Colorado Avalanche	NW	82	44	31	7	272	251	95
10	St. Louis Blues	CE	82	34	35	13	214	254	81
11	Columbus Blue Jackets	CE	82	33	42	7	201	249	73
12	Edmonton Oilers	NW	82	32	43	7	195	248	71
13	Chicago Blackhawks	CE	82	31	42	9	201	258	71
14	Los Angeles Kings	PA	82	27	41	14	227	283	68
15	Phoenix Coyotes	PA	82	31	46	5	216	284	67

bold - qualified for playoffs, y - division title, z - best conference record
CE - Central Division, NW - Northwest Division, PA - Pacific Division

== Playoffs ==
The Nashville Predators ended the 2006–07 regular season as the Western Conference's fourth seed.

== Schedule and results ==
=== Regular season ===
2006–07 regular season
October: 7–3–1 (home: 2–1–1; road: 5–2–0)

Game	Date	Visitor	Score	Home	OT	Decision	Attendance	Record	Points	Recap
1	October 5	Chicago	8 – 6	Nashville		Vokoun	17,113	0–1–0	0	L
2	October 7	Nashville	5 – 6	Minnesota		Vokoun	18,568	0–2–0	0	L
3	October 12	Nashville	1 – 3	Chicago		Mason	8,008	0–3–0	0	L
4	October 14	Phoenix	1 – 4	Nashville		Vokoun	13,770	1–3–0	2	W
5	October 16	Nashville	2 – 1	NY Islanders	SO	Vokoun	9,431	2–3–0	4	W
6	October 18	Nashville	3 – 0	NY Rangers		Vokoun	18,200	3–3–0	6	W
7	October 19	Nashville	4 – 3	New Jersey	SO	Mason	11,274	4–3–0	8	W
8	October 21	Vancouver	4 – 3	Nashville	OT	Vokoun	16,073	4–3–1	9	OTL
9	October 26	San Jose	3 – 4	Nashville		Vokoun	13,436	5–3–1	11	W
10	October 28	Nashville	3 – 2	Calgary		Vokoun	19,289	6–3–1	13	W
11	October 31	Nashville	3 – 2	Vancouver		Vokoun	18,630	7–3–1	15	W

November: 10–2–1 (home: 4–0–1; road: 6–2–0)

Game	Date	Visitor	Score	Home	OT	Decision	Attendance	Record	Points	Recap
12	November 1	Nashville	5 – 3	Edmonton		Mason	16,839	8–3–1	17	W
13	November 4	Nashville	4 – 3	Minnesota		Vokoun	18,568	9–3–1	19	W
14	November 10	Nashville	0 – 3	Detroit		Vokoun	20,066	9–4–1	19	L
15	November 11	Colorado	0 – 1	Nashville		Mason	17,113	10–4–1	21	W
16	November 15	Nashville	5 – 4	Columbus		Vokoun	16,283	11–4–1	23	W
17	November 16	Minnesota	7 – 6	Nashville	SO	Mason	12,759	11–4–2	24	OTL
18	November 18	Columbus	2 – 4	Nashville		Vokoun	13,209	12–4–2	26	W
19	November 20	Nashville	3 – 1	Columbus		Vokoun	16,174	13–4–2	28	W
20	November 22	Nashville	0 – 1	Dallas		Vokoun	17,853	13–5–2	28	L
21	November 23	Vancouver	0 – 6	Nashville		Vokoun	15,396	14–5–2	30	W
22	November 25	Detroit	2 – 6	Nashville		Mason	16,835	15–5–2	32	W
23	November 29	Nashville	3 – 2	Philadelphia		Mason	18,789	16–5–2	34	W
24	November 30	Nashville	5 – 4	St. Louis		Mason	5,410	17–5–2	36	W

December: 9–5–1 (home: 6–1–1; road: 3–4–0)

Game	Date	Visitor	Score	Home	OT	Decision	Attendance	Record	Points	Recap
25	December 2	Chicago	4 – 3	Nashville	OT	Mason	15,530	17–5–3	37	OTL
26	December 4	Nashville	2 – 3	Phoenix		Mason	11,735	17–6–3	37	L
27	December 6	Nashville	0 – 4	Anaheim		Mason	15,362	17–7–3	37	L
28	December 7	Nashville	4 – 1	Los Angeles		Mason	15,119	18–7–3	39	W
29	December 9	Nashville	1 – 3	San Jose		Mason	17,496	18–8–3	39	L
30	December 12	Edmonton	2 – 3	Nashville		Mason	12,032	19–8–3	41	W
31	December 14	Ottawa	0 – 6	Nashville		Mason	12,718	20–8–3	43	W
32	December 16	St. Louis	2 – 3	Nashville	SO	Mason	13,309	21–8–3	45	W
33	December 17	Nashville	2 – 1	St. Louis	OT	Mason	9,318	22–8–3	47	W
34	December 20	Nashville	2 – 1	Chicago		Mason	10,201	23–8–3	49	W
35	December 21	Buffalo	7 – 2	Nashville		Mason	16,616	23–9–3	49	L
36	December 23	Los Angeles	0 – 7	Nashville		Mason	14,739	24–9–3	51	W
37	December 26	St. Louis	2 – 3	Nashville	SO	Mason	14,807	25–9–3	53	W
38	December 29	Nashville	1 – 4	Dallas		Mason	18,532	25–10–3	53	L
39	December 30	Boston	0 – 5	Nashville		Mason	16,612	26–10–3	55	W

January: 10–3–0 (home: 6–1–0; road: 4–2–0)

Game	Date	Visitor	Score	Home	OT	Decision	Attendance	Record	Points	Recap
40	January 1	Colorado	5 – 3	Nashville		Mason	15,878	26–11–3	55	L
41	January 5	Nashville	8 – 3	Chicago		Mason	13,186	27–11–3	57	W
42	January 6	St. Louis	2 – 3	Nashville		Mason	14,438	28–11–3	59	W
43	January 9	Anaheim	4 – 5	Nashville	OT	Vokoun	11,821	29–11–3	61	W
44	January 12	Columbus	0 – 2	Nashville		Vokoun	14,136	30–11–3	63	W
45	January 13	Nashville	4 – 1	Columbus		Mason	16,825	31–11–3	65	W
46	January 15	Calgary	3 – 5	Nashville		Vokoun	12,011	32–11–3	67	W
47	January 17	Nashville	3 – 5	Detroit		Mason	20,066	32–12–3	67	L
48	January 18	Columbus	0 – 4	Nashville		Mason	10,927	33–12–3	69	W
49	January 20	Chicago	3 – 6	Nashville		Mason	17,113	34–12–3	71	W
50	January 26	Nashville	3 – 1	Chicago		Vokoun	11,162	35–12–3	73	W
51	January 27	Nashville	6 – 3	St. Louis		Mason	16,346	36–12–3	75	W
52	January 30	Nashville	3 – 4	Colorado		Vokoun	17,119	36–13–3	75	L

February: 7–5–1 (home: 5–2–1; road: 2–3–0)

Game	Date	Visitor	Score	Home	OT	Decision	Attendance	Record	Points	Recap
53	February 1	Nashville	2 – 3	Phoenix		Vokoun	14,047	36–14–3	75	L
54	February 3	Anaheim	0 – 3	Nashville		Vokoun	17,113	37–14–3	77	W
55	February 6	Nashville	1 – 4	Pittsburgh		Mason	16,333	37–15–3	77	L
56	February 8	Toronto	2 – 4	Nashville		Vokoun	15,018	38–15–3	79	W
57	February 10	Los Angeles	4 – 1	Nashville		Vokoun	17,113	38–16–3	79	L
58	February 14	San Jose	0 – 5	Nashville		Vokoun	13,836	39–16–3	81	W
59	February 16	Nashville	0 – 1	St. Louis		Mason	15,660	39–17–3	81	L
60	February 17	Minnesota	4 – 1	Nashville		Vokoun	17,113	39–18–3	81	L
61	February 19	Phoenix	1 – 4	Nashville		Vokoun	15,862	40–18–3	83	W
62	February 22	Montreal	6 – 5	Nashville	SO	Vokoun	15,808	40–18–4	84	OTL
63	February 24	Detroit	3 – 4	Nashville	OT	Vokoun	17,113	41–18–4	86	W
64	February 25	Nashville	4 – 3	Columbus	OT	Mason	16,220	42–18–4	88	W
65	February 28	Nashville	4 – 3	San Jose	SO	Vokoun	17,496	43–18–4	90	W

March: 6–5–3 (home: 4–3–0; road: 2–2–3)

Game	Date	Visitor	Score	Home	OT	Decision	Attendance	Record	Points	Recap
66	March 3	Nashville	6 – 3	Los Angeles		Mason	16,854	44–18–4	92	W
67	March 4	Nashville	2 – 3	Anaheim	SO	Vokoun	17,174	44–18–5	93	OTL
68	March 6	Nashville	3 – 4	Detroit		Vokoun	20,066	44–18–6	94	OTL
69	March 8	Calgary	3 – 6	Nashville		Mason	15,515	45–18–6	96	W
70	March 10	Columbus	1 – 2	Nashville		Vokoun	17,113	46–18–6	98	W
71	March 13	Detroit	5 – 2	Nashville		Vokoun	17,113	46–19–6	98	L
72	March 14	Nashville	2 – 4	Detroit		Mason	20,066	46–20–6	98	L
73	March 17	Dallas	2 – 3	Nashville		Vokoun	17,113	47–20–6	100	W
74	March 21	Nashville	0 – 2	Vancouver		Vokoun	18,630	47–21–6	100	L
75	March 22	Nashville	2 – 3	Calgary	OT	Mason	19,289	47–21–7	101	OTL
76	March 24	Nashville	4 – 0	Edmonton		Vokoun	16,839	48–21–7	103	W
77	March 27	Edmonton	3 – 4	Nashville		Vokoun	16,832	49–21–7	105	W
78	March 29	Detroit	2 – 1	Nashville		Vokoun	16,646	49–22–7	105	L
79	March 31	Dallas	4 – 2	Nashville		Vokoun	17,113	49–23–7	105	L

April: 2–0–1 (home: 1–0–1; road: 1–0–0)

Game	Date	Visitor	Score	Home	OT	Decision	Attendance	Record	Points	Recap
80	April 3	Chicago	3 – 2	Nashville	SO	Mason	14,663	49–23–8	106	OTL
81	April 5	St. Louis	1 – 4	Nashville		Vokoun	16,624	50–23–8	108	W
82	April 7	Nashville	4 – 2	Colorado		Vokoun	17,462	51–23–8	110	W

Legend: W Win (2 points) L Loss (0 points) OTL Overtime/shootout loss (1 point)

=== Playoffs ===
2007 Stanley Cup playoffs
Western Conference quarterfinals: vs. (5) San Jose Sharks — Sharks win 4–1

Game	Date	Visitor	Score	Home	OT	Decision	Attendance	Series	Recap
1	April 11	San Jose	5 – 4	Nashville	2OT	Vokoun	17,113	0 – 1	L
2	April 13	San Jose	2 – 5	Nashville		Vokoun	17,113	1 – 1	W
3	April 16	Nashville	1 – 3	San Jose		Vokoun	17,496	1 – 2	L
4	April 18	Nashville	2 – 3	San Jose		Vokoun	17,496	1 – 3	L
5	April 20	San Jose	3 – 2	Nashville		Vokoun	17,113	1 – 4	L

Legend: W Win L Loss

== Player statistics ==
=== Scoring ===
- Position abbreviations: C = Center; D = Defense; G = Goaltender; LW = Left wing; RW = Right wing
- † = Joined team via a transaction (e.g., trade, waivers, signing) during the season. Stats reflect time with the Predators only.
- ‡ = Left team via a transaction (e.g., trade, waivers, release) during the season. Stats reflect time with the Predators only.

No.	Player	Pos	Regular season						Playoffs					
No.	Player	Pos	GP	G	A	Pts	+/-	PIM	GP	G	A	Pts	+/-	PIM
9	Paul Kariya	LW	82	24	52	76	6	36	5	0	2	2	−4	2
71	Jean-Pierre Dumont	RW	82	21	45	66	14	28	5	4	2	6	4	0
11	David Legwand	C	78	27	36	63	23	44	5	0	3	3	−2	2
26	Steve Sullivan	RW	57	22	38	60	16	20	—	—	—	—	—	—
10	Martin Erat	RW	68	16	41	57	13	50	3	0	1	1	−1	0
44	Kimmo Timonen	D	80	13	42	55	20	42	5	0	2	2	−1	4
19	Jason Arnott	C	68	27	27	54	15	48	5	2	1	3	0	2
6	Shea Weber	D	79	17	23	40	13	60	5	0	3	3	0	2
17	Scott Hartnell	LW	64	22	17	39	19	96	5	1	1	2	−1	28
47	Alexander Radulov	RW	64	18	19	37	19	26	4	3	1	4	1	19
3	Marek Zidlicky	D	79	4	26	30	8	72	5	0	2	2	−1	4
38	Vernon Fiddler	C	72	11	15	26	11	40	5	1	1	2	−3	4
20	Ryan Suter	D	82	8	16	24	10	54	5	1	0	1	0	8
2	Dan Hamhuis	D	81	6	14	20	8	66	5	0	1	1	−3	2
21	Peter Forsberg†	C	17	2	13	15	5	16	5	2	2	4	2	12
12	Scott Nichol	C	59	7	6	13	7	79	5	0	0	0	1	17
63	Josef Vasicek‡	C	38	4	9	13	1	29	—	—	—	—	—	—
25	Jerred Smithson	C	64	5	7	12	−8	42	5	0	0	0	−2	17
22	Jordin Tootoo	RW	65	3	6	9	−11	116	4	0	1	1	−2	21
5	Greg Zanon	D	66	3	5	8	16	32	5	0	2	2	−2	2
14	Ramzi Abid	LW	13	1	4	5	−3	13	2	0	0	0	−1	0
16	Darcy Hordichuk	LW	53	1	3	4	−2	90	2	0	0	0	0	0
7	Scottie Upshall‡	LW	14	2	1	3	−1	18	—	—	—	—	—	—
42	Mikko Lehtonen‡	D	15	1	2	3	0	8	—	—	—	—	—	—
29	Tomas Vokoun	G	44	0	2	2		4	5	0	0	0		2
8	Kevin Klein	D	3	1	0	1	3	0	—	—	—	—	—	—
34	Sheldon Brookbank	D	3	0	1	1	0	12	—	—	—	—	—	—
30	Chris Mason	G	40	0	1	1		4	—	—	—	—	—	—
37	Rich Peverley†	C	13	0	1	1	−1	0	—	—	—	—	—	—
4	Vitaly Vishnevski†	D	15	0	1	1	1	10	—	—	—	—	—	—
28	Patrick Leahy	RW	1	0	0	0	0	0	—	—	—	—	—	—
49	Michael Leighton†‡	G	1	0	0	0		0	—	—	—	—	—	—

=== Goaltending ===
- † = Joined team via a transaction (e.g., trade, waivers, signing) during the season. Stats reflect time with the Predators only.
- ‡ = Left team via a transaction (e.g., trade, waivers, release) during the season. Stats reflect time with the Predators only.

No.	Player	Regular season										Playoffs								
No.	Player	GP	W	L	OT	SA	GA	GAA	SV%	SO	TOI	GP	W	L	SA	GA	GAA	SV%	SO	TOI
29	Tomas Vokoun	44	27	12	4	1299	104	2.40	.920	5	2601	5	1	4	163	16	2.97	.902	0	324
30	Chris Mason	40	24	11	4	1244	93	2.38	.925	5	2342	—	—	—	—	—	—	—	—	—
49	Michael Leighton†‡	1	0	0	0	10	2	6.07	.800	0	20	—	—	—	—	—	—	—	—	—

== Awards and records ==
=== Awards ===
Type	Award/honor	Recipient	Ref
League (in-season)	NHL All-Star Game selection	Kimmo Timonen	
League (in-season)	NHL All-Star Game selection	Barry Trotz (coach)	
League (in-season)	NHL First Star of the Week	David Legwand (January 21)	
League (in-season)	NHL Second Star of the Week	Chris Mason (December 17)	
League (in-season)	NHL YoungStars Game selection	Alexander Radulov	
League (in-season)	NHL YoungStars Game selection	Shea Weber	

=== Milestones ===
Milestone	Player	Date	Ref
First game	Mikko Lehtonen	October 7, 2006	
First game	Alexander Radulov	October 21, 2006	
First game	Sheldon Brookbank	February 6, 2007	
First game	Rich Peverley	March 4, 2007	

== Transactions ==
The Predators were involved in the following transactions from June 20, 2006, the day after the deciding game of the 2006 Stanley Cup Finals, through June 6, 2007, the day of the deciding game of the 2007 Stanley Cup Finals.

=== Trades ===
Date	Details		Ref
July 18, 2006	To Nashville Predators: Josef Vasicek	To Carolina Hurricanes: Scott Walker	
July 19, 2006	To Nashville Predators: Dominic Moore	To New York Rangers: Adam Hall	
July 19, 2006	To Nashville Predators: 3rd-round pick in 2007	To Pittsburgh Penguins: Dominic Moore; Libor Pivko	
January 26, 2007	To Nashville Predators: Chris Durno	To Anaheim Ducks: Shane Endicott	
February 9, 2007	To Nashville Predators: Eric Belanger	To Carolina Hurricanes: Josef Vasicek	
February 10, 2007	To Nashville Predators: Vitaly Vishnevski	To Atlanta Thrashers: Eric Belanger	
February 15, 2007	To Nashville Predators: Peter Forsberg	To Philadelphia Flyers: Ryan Parent; Scottie Upshall; 1st-round pick in 2007; Conditional 3rd-round pick in 2007 (Note: Condition not met. The Flyers would have received the pick if Nashville re-signed Forsberg for the 2007–08 season.)	
February 27, 2007	To Nashville Predators: 4th-round pick in 2007	To Buffalo Sabres: Mikko Lehtonen	
June 4, 2007	To Nashville Predators: Matt Ellison	To Philadelphia Flyers: Future considerations	

=== Players acquired ===
Date	Player	Former team	Term	Via	Ref
July 2, 2006	Jason Arnott	Dallas Stars	5-year	Free agency	
July 17, 2006	Shane Endicott	Pittsburgh Penguins		Free agency	
July 17, 2006	Karl Goehring	San Antonio Rampage (AHL)		Free agency	
July 17, 2006	Pat Leahy	Boston Bruins		Free agency	
July 17, 2006	Nolan Yonkman	Washington Capitals		Free agency	
July 21, 2006	Ramzi Abid	Atlanta Thrashers	1-year	Free agency	
August 21, 2006	Alex Henry	Minnesota Wild	1-year	Free agency	
August 29, 2006	Jean-Pierre Dumont	Buffalo Sabres	2-year	Free agency	
October 2, 2006	Kim Staal	Malmo Redhawks (Allsvenskan)	1-year	Free agency	
October 6, 2006	Kelsey Wilson	Guelph Storm (OHL)	3-year	Free agency	
November 27, 2006	Michael Leighton	Anaheim Ducks		Waivers	
January 17, 2007	Rich Peverley	Milwaukee Admirals (AHL)	2-year	Free agency	
June 1, 2007	Antti Pihlstrom	HPK (Liiga)	2-year	Free agency	
June 1, 2007	Oliver Setzinger	Vienna Capitals (EBEL)	1-year	Free agency	

=== Players lost ===
Date	Player	New team	Via (Note: In parentheses is the player's free agency group on July 1 if applicable.)	Ref
July 2, 2006	Mike Sillinger	New York Islanders	Free agency (III)	
July 3, 2006	Mark Eaton	Pittsburgh Penguins	Free agency (III)	
July 3, 2006	Brendan Witt	New York Islanders	Free agency (III)	
July 4, 2006	Darren Haydar	Atlanta Thrashers	Free agency (VI)	
July 17, 2006	Brian Finley	Boston Bruins	Free agency (UFA)	
July 20, 2006	Rick Berry	New York Islanders	Free agency (UFA)	
July 26, 2006	Danny Markov	Detroit Red Wings	Free agency (III)	
August 2, 2006	Greg Classen	Hamburg Freezers (DEL)	Free agency (II)	
August 14, 2006	Greg Johnson	Detroit Red Wings	Free agency (III)	
October 29, 2006	Yanic Perreault	Phoenix Coyotes	Free agency (III)	
November 10, 2006	Jeremy Yablonski	Idaho Steelheads (ECHL)	Free agency (UFA)	
January 11, 2007	Michael Leighton	Philadelphia Flyers	Waivers	

=== Signings ===
Date	Player	Term	Contract type	Ref
July 1, 2006	Chris Mason	2-year	Re-signing	
July 2, 2006	Cody Franson		Entry-level	
July 17, 2006	Brandon Segal		Re-signing	
July 21, 2006	Sheldon Brookbank	1-year	Re-signing	
July 21, 2006	Jordin Tootoo	2-year	Re-signing	
July 22, 2006	David Legwand	2-year	Re-signing	
July 24, 2006	Martin Erat	2-year	Re-signing	
August 1, 2006	Scott Hartnell	1-year	Re-signing	
September 11, 2006	Tomas Vokoun	4-year	Extension	
September 21, 2006	Dan Hamhuis	4-year	Re-signing	
October 6, 2006	Cal O'Reilly	3-year	Entry-level	
May 24, 2007	Teemu Laakso	3-year	Entry-level	
June 1, 2007	Patric Hornqvist	3-year	Entry-level	
June 1, 2007	Janne Niskala	1-year	Entry-level	
June 1, 2007	Alexander Sulzer	2-year	Entry-level	
June 1, 2007	Richard Stehlik	2-year	Entry-level	

== Draft picks ==
Nashville's picks at the 2006 NHL entry draft in Vancouver, British Columbia. The Predators traded their first round pick, thus their first selection was in the 2nd round, 56th overall.

Round	#	Player	Nationality	NHL team	College/junior/club team (League)
2	56	Blake Geoffrion (LW)	United States	Nashville Predators	U.S. National Team Development Program (NAHL)
4	105	Niko Snellman (W)	Finland	Nashville Predators (from Atlanta)	Ilves (SM-liiga)
5	146	Mark Dekanich (G)	Canada	Nashville Predators	Colgate University (ECAC)
6	176	Ryan Flynn (RW)	United States	Nashville Predators	U.S. National Team Development Program (NAHL)
7	206	Viktor Sjodin (W)	Sweden	Nashville Predators	VIK Västerås HK Jr. (Sweden)

== Minor league affiliates ==
The Milwaukee Admirals were Nashville's top affiliate in the American Hockey League in 2006–07, and the New Mexico Scorpions were the Central Hockey League affiliate.

== See also ==
- 2006–07 NHL season
- 2007 Stanley Cup playoffs
