= David Kočí =

Czech ice hockey player (born 1981)

- David Kočí, 2026
- Born: May 12, 1981 (age 45) Prague, Czechoslovakia
- Height: 6 ft 6 in (198 cm)
- Weight: 238 lb (108 kg; 17 st 0 lb)
- Position: Left wing
- Shot: Left
- Played for: Chicago Blackhawks; Tampa Bay Lightning; St. Louis Blues; Colorado Avalanche; HC Sparta Praha
- NHL draft: 146th overall, 2000; Pittsburgh Penguins
- Playing career: 2001–2014

David Kočí (born May 12, 1981) is a Czech former professional ice hockey player who is currently coaching within HC Sparta Praha in the Czech Extraliga. He previously played in the National Hockey League with the Chicago Blackhawks, Tampa Bay Lightning, St. Louis Blues and the Colorado Avalanche.

== Playing career ==
Kočí was drafted 146th overall in the 2000 NHL entry draft by the Pittsburgh Penguins. Kočí played in the WHL with the Prince George Cougars in the 2000-01 season before turning professional for the 2001-02 season.

Kočí spent the next five years with the Penguins minor-league affiliates, between the Wheeling Nailers of the ECHL and Wilkes-Barre/Scranton Penguins of the AHL. Prior to the 2006-07 season, Kočí signed with the Chicago Blackhawks on July 17, 2006.

Kočí was assigned to the Blackhawks affiliate, the Norfolk Admirals, but made his NHL debut on March 10, 2007, against the Phoenix Coyotes, and amassed 32 penalty minutes in three fights. He lost his first fight to Josh Gratton, but managed to get a rematch in which he fared much better. He fought defenceman Nick Boynton as well. By the end of the 2006–07 season, David played in nine games and collected 88 penalty minutes.

During the Blackhawks' loss to the Boston Bruins on October 25, 2007, Kočí got into one of the nastiest hockey brawls in recent hockey memory with Bruins defenceman Zdeno Chára. Kočí, who had broken his nose several days before, and Chára started punching each other; blood started to spatter from Kočí's nose. The Blackhawks placed Kočí on injured reserve and he missed about two weeks.

On July 1, 2008, Kočí signed with the Tampa Bay Lightning to a one-year deal. During the 2008–09 season, on October 21, 2008, David was claimed off waivers by St. Louis Blues after only playing one game for Tampa Bay. Kočí then returned to the Lightning after he was placed on waivers after 5 games with the Blues. Kočí scored his first NHL goal in a 3–2 defeat against the Montreal Canadiens on March 26, 2009. The puck was actually tapped in by a Canadiens player but credit was given to him.

On July 1, 2009, Kočí signed a one-year contract with the Colorado Avalanche. He scored his first goal with the Avalanche, and second career goal, when he unintentionally deflected in a Brett Clark shot in a 3–2 victory over the Calgary Flames on October 28, 2009. On December 15, 2009, during a 6–1 defeat to the Washington Capitals, Kočí raised ire after he was ejected from the game after a major boarding penalty on Capitals defenseman Mike Green. He was subsequently fined by the NHL. Kočí recorded 11 Fighting Majors before suffering a broken hand in a fight against D.J. King of the St. Louis Blues on February 8, 2010. He finished the 2009–10 season with a career-high 43 games and was re-signed to a one-year contract by the Avalanche on June 2, 2010.

A free agent, on September 1, 2011, Koci was invited to the Winnipeg Jets training Camp before he was released prior to the 2011–12 season on September 30, 2011. In returning to his native Czech Republic, he linked up with his former youth club, HC Sparta Praha, and made his long-awaited Czech Extraliga debut. In leading Sparta with 132 penalty minutes, Koci also contributed with 5 assists, to earn a one-year extension with the club on May 21, 2012.

== Career statistics ==
			Regular season					Playoffs
Season	Team	League	GP	G	A	Pts	PIM	GP	G	A	Pts	PIM
1997–98	HC Sparta Praha	CZE U18	41	2	9	11	105	—	—	—	—	—
1998–99	HC Sparta Praha	CZE U20	47	0	7	7	124	—	—	—	—	—
1999–2000	HC Sparta Praha	CZE U20	36	0	4	4	79	—	—	—	—	—
2000–01	Prince George Cougars	WHL	70	2	7	9	155	6	0	0	0	20
2001–02	Wheeling Nailers	ECHL	33	2	4	6	105	—	—	—	—	—
2001–02	Wilkes–Barre/Scranton Penguins	AHL	26	1	3	4	98	—	—	—	—	—
2002–03	Wheeling Nailers	ECHL	48	0	1	1	103	—	—	—	—	—
2002–03	Wilkes–Barre/Scranton Penguins	AHL	9	0	0	0	4	—	—	—	—	—
2003–04	Wilkes–Barre/Scranton Penguins	AHL	78	1	7	8	298	10	0	0	0	2
2004–05	Wilkes–Barre/Scranton Penguins	AHL	68	1	9	10	311	—	—	—	—	—
2005–06	Wilkes–Barre/Scranton Penguins	AHL	13	0	0	0	59	—	—	—	—	—
2006–07	Norfolk Admirals	AHL	44	0	1	1	223	—	—	—	—	—
2006–07	Chicago Blackhawks	NHL	9	0	0	0	88	—	—	—	—	—
2007–08	Chicago Blackhawks	NHL	18	0	0	0	68	—	—	—	—	—
2007–08	Rockford IceHogs	AHL	7	0	0	0	25	—	—	—	—	—
2007–08	Norfolk Admirals	AHL	21	0	2	2	57	—	—	—	—	—
2008–09	Tampa Bay Lightning	NHL	33	1	1	2	132	—	—	—	—	—
2008–09	St. Louis Blues	NHL	4	0	0	0	9	—	—	—	—	—
2009–10	Colorado Avalanche	NHL	43	1	0	1	84	—	—	—	—	—
2010–11	Colorado Avalanche	NHL	35	1	0	1	80	—	—	—	—	—
2011–12	HC Sparta Praha	ELH	41	0	5	5	132	3	0	0	0	2
2012–13	HC Sparta Praha	ELH	30	0	2	2	122	3	0	0	0	4
2013–14	HC Sparta Praha	ELH	5	0	0	0	0	1	0	0	0	0
AHL totals			266	3	22	25	1075	10	0	0	0	24
NHL totals			142	3	1	4	461	—	—	—	—	—
