= 2006–07 Anaheim Ducks season =

NHL team season

2006–07 Anaheim Ducks
- Stanley Cup champions
- Western Conference champions
- Pacific Division champions
- Division: 1st Pacific
- Conference: 2nd Western
- 2006–07 record: 48–20–14
- Home record: 26–6–9
- Road record: 22–14–5
- Goals for: 258
- Goals against: 208

Team information
- General manager: Brian Burke
- Coach: Randy Carlyle
- Captain: Scott Niedermayer
- Alternate captains: Rob Niedermayer; Chris Pronger
- Arena: Honda Center
- Average attendance: 16,339 (95.1%); Total: 699,903
- Minor league affiliates: Portland Pirates; Augusta Lynx

Team leaders
- Goals: Teemu Selanne (48)
- Assists: Scott Niedermayer (54)
- Points: Teemu Selanne (94)
- Penalty minutes: George Parros (102)
- Plus/minus: Chris Pronger (+27)
- Wins: Jean-Sebastien Giguere (36)
- Goals against average: Jean-Sebastien Giguere (2.26)

The 2006–07 Anaheim Ducks season was the 14th season of operation (13th season of play) for the National Hockey League (NHL) franchise. It was the team's 1st season as the Anaheim Ducks. The Ducks clinched their first Pacific Division title in team history with 110 points, and defeated the Ottawa Senators in the Stanley Cup Finals four games to one. It was the first Stanley Cup in franchise history, as well as the first time a team in the state of California won the Stanley Cup.

== Off-season ==
Under new ownership, the Mighty Ducks of Anaheim changed their team and arena's name, logo and player uniforms. The change involving their name was dropping the "Mighty" from their name, and completely changing their jerseys to black, gold, orange and white colours rather than the eggplant, jade, silver and white from years past.

In a major acquisition, the club acquired defenseman Chris Pronger in a trade from the Edmonton Oilers. Pronger had recently appeared in the 2006 Stanley Cup Finals and on the basis of the deal, the media felt that the Ducks would be one of the favorites for the Cup. In the 2006 NHL entry draft, the Ducks chose Mark Mitera with their first-round pick, 19th overall.

Not only did the Ducks change their name and logos, but their home arena of 13 years saw some changes as well. On October 3, 2006, the Arrowhead Pond of Anaheim was officially renamed Honda Center. The partnership was reportedly for 15 years with an option to extend the naming agreement 10 years. Other changes to the arena included new displays in the rafters behind the goals and four large "Honda Center" signs on each corner of the building. During the pre-season, however, the arena was officially still the Arrowhead Pond of Anaheim.

== Regular season ==
The team came out of the gate to set an NHL record by earning at least one point in each of their first 16 games, a streak which ended exactly five weeks after their first game. They went 12–0–4 (28 points) before they lost their first regulation game of the year, a 3–0 shutout to the Calgary Flames, on November 10, 2006. The streak was broken seven years later by the 2012–13 Chicago Blackhawks, who went 24 games with a point. Behind goaltending by Jean-Sebastien Giguere and Ilya Bryzgalov, an offense headed by Teemu Selanne and a defense anchored by Scott Niedermayer and off-season acquisition Chris Pronger, the Ducks had worked their way to one of the NHL's best records.

On January 9, the NHL announced that Scott Niedermayer had been voted by the fans to start at defense in the 2007 All-Star Game in Dallas, Texas. He later declined to appear, deciding to rest a stress fracture in his foot. Ed Jovanovski of the Phoenix Coyotes was added to replace him. The Ducks' Andy McDonald was later added to replace Henrik Zetterberg of the Detroit Red Wings.

=== Standings ===
==== Divisional standings ====
Pacific Division
No.	CR		GP	W	L	OTL	GF	GA	Pts
1	2	**Anaheim Ducks**	82	48	20	14	258	208	110
2	5	**San Jose Sharks**	82	51	26	5	258	199	107
3	6	**Dallas Stars**	82	50	25	7	226	197	107
4	14	Los Angeles Kings	82	27	41	14	227	283	68
5	15	Phoenix Coyotes	82	31	46	5	216	284	67

Note: CR = Conference rank; GP = Games played; W = Wins; L = Losses; T = Ties; OTL = Overtime/shootout loss; GF = Goals for; GA = Goals against; PIM = Penalties in minutes; Pts = Points
Bolded teams qualified for the playoffs.

==== Conference standings ====
Western Conference
R		Div	GP	W	L	OTL	GF	GA	Pts
**1**	**z-Detroit Red Wings**	**CE**	**82**	**50**	**19**	**13**	**254**	**199**	**113**
**2**	**y-Anaheim Ducks**	**PA**	**82**	**48**	**20**	**14**	**258**	**208**	**110**
**3**	**y-Vancouver Canucks**	**NW**	**82**	**49**	**26**	**7**	**222**	**201**	**105**
**4**	**Nashville Predators**	**CE**	**82**	**51**	**23**	**8**	**272**	**212**	**110**
**5**	**San Jose Sharks**	**PA**	**82**	**51**	**26**	**5**	**258**	**199**	**107**
**6**	**Dallas Stars**	**PA**	**82**	**50**	**25**	**7**	**226**	**197**	**107**
**7**	**Minnesota Wild**	**NW**	**82**	**48**	**26**	**8**	**235**	**191**	**104**
**8**	**Calgary Flames**	**NW**	**82**	**43**	**29**	**10**	**258**	**226**	**96**
8.5
9	Colorado Avalanche	NW	82	44	31	7	272	251	95
10	St. Louis Blues	CE	82	34	35	13	214	254	81
11	Columbus Blue Jackets	CE	82	33	42	7	201	249	73
12	Edmonton Oilers	NW	82	32	43	7	195	248	71
13	Chicago Blackhawks	CE	82	31	42	9	201	258	71
14	Los Angeles Kings	PA	82	27	41	14	227	283	68
15	Phoenix Coyotes	PA	82	31	46	5	216	284	67

bold - qualified for playoffs, y - division title, z - best conference record
CE - Central Division, NW - Northwest Division, PA - Pacific Division

== Playoffs ==
The Anaheim Ducks ended the 2006–07 regular season tied in points with the Nashville Predators, with 110 points. The Predators, however, had three more wins, but the Ducks nonetheless earned the second seed as they won the Pacific Division, as the Predators placed second in the Central Division behind the conference-leading and first seed Detroit Red Wings.

The Ducks defeated the Minnesota Wild in the first round, four games to one. In the second round, the Ducks defeated the Vancouver Canucks by the same four games to one result. In the Conference Final, the Ducks defeated the Detroit Red Wings four games to two to advance to the Stanley Cup Finals for the second time in franchise history. In the Final, the Ducks defeated the Ottawa Senators four games to one to claim the franchise's first Stanley Cup championship.

== Schedule and results ==
=== Preseason ===
2006 preseason
Preseason: 3–2–3 (home: 3–1–0; road: 0–1–3)

#	Date	Opponent	Score	OT	Win	Loss	Attendance	Record	Arena	Recap
1	September 18	Kings	1–7		Garon (1–0–0)	Leighton (0–1–0)		0–1–0	Arrowhead Pond of Anaheim	L
2	September 20	Sharks	6–3					1–1–0	Arrowhead Pond of Anaheim	W
3	September 22	Canucks	5–1		Giguere (1–0–0)	Luongo (0–2–0)		2–1–0	Arrowhead Pond of Anaheim	W
4	September 23	@ Sharks	3–4		Toskala (1–0–0)			2–2–0	Save Mart Center	L
5	September 24	@ Canucks	3–4	SO	Luongo (1–2–0)	Bryzgalov (0–0–1)		2–2–1	General Motors Place	OTL
6	September 25	@ Kings	4–5	SO		Giguere (1–0–1)		2–2–2	Staples Center	OTL
7	September 27	Coyotes	3–2		Bryzgalov (1–0–1)	Joseph (0–1–0)		3–2–2	Arrowhead Pond of Anaheim	W
8	September 30	@ Coyotes	1–2	OT	Joseph (1–1–0)	Giguere (1–0–2)		3–2–3	Glendale Arena	OTL

Legend: W Win (2 points) L Loss (0 points) OTL Overtime/shootout loss (1 point)

=== Regular season ===
2006–07 regular season
October: 9–0–3 (home: 5–0–2; road: 4–0–1)

#	Date	Opponent	Score	OT	Win	Loss	Attendance	Record	Arena	Recap	Points
1	October 6	Kings	4–3		Giguere (1–0–0)	Cloutier (0–1–0)	17,174	1–0–0	Honda Center	W	2
2	October 7	@ Coyotes	2–1		Bryzgalov (1–0–0)	Joseph (1–1–0)	15,897	2–0–0	Glendale Arena	W	4
3	October 9	Blues	2–0		Giguere (2–0–0)	Sanford (0–1–0)	13,389	3–0–0	Honda Center	W	6
4	October 11	Islanders	4–5	SO	Dunham (1–1–0)	Giguere (2–0–1)	12,394	3–0–1	Honda Center	OTL	7
5	October 15	Stars	3–4	SO	Turco (5–0–0)	Giguere (2–0–2)	15,269	3–0–2	Honda Center	OTL	8
6	October 18	Red Wings	4–1		Giguere (3–0–2)	Hasek (2–2–1)	14,767	4–0–2	Honda Center	W	10
7	October 20	Wild	2–1		Giguere (4–0–2)	Fernandez (5–1–0)	13,430	5–0–2	Honda Center	W	12
8	October 22	@ Kings	3–2	SO	Giguere (5–0–2)	Garon (2–1–1)	18,118	6–0–2	Staples Center	W	14
9	October 25	Oilers	6–2		Giguere (6–0–2)	Roloson (5–3–0)	13,537	7–0–2	Honda Center	W	16
10	October 27	@ Wild	2–3	SO	Fernandez (8–1–0)	Giguere (6–0–3)	18,568	7–0–3	Xcel Energy Center	OTL	17
11	October 28	@ Blackhawks	3–0		Bryzgalov (2–0–0)	Boucher (0–4–0)	13,580	8–0–3	United Center	W	19
12	October 30	@ Blues	6–5	SO	Giguere (7–0–3)	Sanford (1–1–2)	8,629	9–0–3	Scottrade Center	W	21

November: 10–2–3 (home: 7–1–2; road: 3–1–1)

#	Date	Opponent	Score	OT	Win	Loss	Attendance	Record	Arena	Recap	Points
13	November 1	Rangers	3–4	OT 3:09	Weekes (1–1–0)	Giguere (7–0–4)	13,350	9–0–4	Honda Center	OTL	22
14	November 3	Coyotes	6–2		Bryzgalov (3–0–0)	Joseph (2–6–0)	14,833	10–0–4	Honda Center	W	24
15	November 6	Penguins	3–2	OT :44	Giguere (8–0–4)	Thibault (0–0–1)	16,599	11–0–4	Honda Center	W	26
16	November 9	@ Canucks	6–1		Giguere (9–0–4)	Luongo (8–7–1)	18,630	12–0–4	General Motors Place	W	28
17	November 10	@ Flames	0–3		Kiprusoff (6–7–1)	Bryzgalov (3–1–0)	19,289	12–1–4	Pengrowth Saddledome	L	28
18	November 12	Wild	3–2		Giguere (10–0–4)	Backstrom (2–1–0)	16,306	13–1–4	Honda Center	W	30
19	November 15	Flyers	4–7		Esche (2–3–0)	Giguere (10–1–4)	15,379	13–2–4	Honda Center	L	30
20	November 17	Blackhawks	3–4	SO	Khabibulin (5–2–0)	Bryzgalov (3–1–1)	16,526	13–2–5	Honda Center	OTL	31
21	November 19	Coyotes	6–4		Giguere (11–1–4)	Joseph (4–10–0)	16,394	14–2–5	Honda Center	W	33
22	November 21	Sharks	5–0		Giguere (12–1–4)	Nabokov (5–5–0)	15,013	15–2–5	Honda Center	W	35
23	November 22	@ Avalanche	2–3	SO	Theodore (6–6–1)	Giguere (12–1–5)	17,104	15–2–6	Pepsi Center	OTL	36
24	November 24	Devils	4–2		Giguere (13–1–5)	Brodeur (12–8–0)	16,599	16–2–6	Honda Center	W	38
25	November 26	Flames	5–3		Wall (1–0–0)	McLennan (0–1–1)	17,174	17–2–6	Honda Center	W	40
26	November 28	@ Oilers	3–2	OT 2:19	Giguere (14–1–5)	Roloson (5–3–0)	16,839	18–2–6	Rexall Place	W	42
27	November 30	@ Canucks	2–1		Giguere (15–1–5)	Luongo (12–11–1)	18,630	19–2–6	General Motors Place	W	44

December: 9–5–0 (home: 3–1–0; road: 6–4–0)

#	Date	Opponent	Score	OT	Win	Loss	Attendance	Record	Arena	Recap	Points
28	December 2	@ Kings	4–3		Giguere (16–1–5)	Cloutier (4–9–2)	16,141	20–2–6	Staples Center	W	46
29	December 3	Kings	2–3		Cloutier (5–9–2)	Giguere (16–2–5)	17,174	20–3–6	Honda Center	L	46
30	December 6	Predators	4–0		Giguere (17–2–5)	Mason (6–3–2)	15,362	21–3–6	Honda Center	W	48
31	December 8	@ Capitals	6–1		Giguere (18–2–5)	Kolzig (10–7–3)	12,269	22–3–6	Verizon Center	W	50
32	December 9	@ Lightning	4–3		Giguere (19–2–5)	Denis (6–9–2)	18,719	23–3–6	St. Pete Times Forum	W	52
33	December 12	@ Panthers	5–4		Giguere (20–2–5)	Auld (6–10–4)	13,140	24–3–6	BankAtlantic Center	W	54
34	December 13	@ Thrashers	2–1		Giguere (21–2–5)	Lehtonen (13–7–4)	16,028	25–3–6	Philips Arena	W	56
35	December 16	@ Sharks	3–4		Nabokov (10–6–0)	Giguere (21–3–5)	17,496	25–4–6	HP Pavilion at San Jose	L	56
36	December 18	Flames	4–1		Giguere (22–3–5)	Kiprusoff (16–11–2)	17,174	26–4–6	Honda Center	W	58
37	December 20	Stars	4–1		Giguere (23–3–5)	Turco (16–10–0)	17,174	27–4–6	Honda Center	W	60
38	December 23	@ Coyotes	0–2		Tellqvist (4–3–1)	Giguere (23–4–5)	14,843	27–5–6	Jobing.com Arena	L	60
39	December 26	@ Sharks	4–3		Wall (2–0–0)	Nabokov (11–7–0)	17,496	28–5–6	HP Pavilion at San Jose	W	62
40	December 29	@ Hurricanes	2–4		Ward (18–9–3)	Wall (2–1–0)	18,790	28–6–6	RBC Center	L	62
41	December 31	@ Wild	3–4		Fernandez (16–13–0)	Wall (2–2–0)	18,568	28–7–6	Xcel Energy Center	L	62

January: 4–5–2 (home: 3–2–1; road: 1–3–1)

#	Date	Opponent	Score	OT	Win	Loss	Attendance	Record	Arena	Recap	Points
42	January 2	@ Red Wings	1–2		Hasek (21–5–3)	Bryzgalov (3–2–1)	20,066	28–8–6	Joe Louis Arena	L	62
43	January 5	Blue Jackets	3–4		Norrena (10–9–1)	Bryzgalov (3–3–1)	17,405	28–9–6	Honda Center	L	62
44	January 7	Red Wings	4–2		Bryzgalov (4–3–1)	Hasek (21–7–3)	17,418	29–9–6	Honda Center	W	64
45	January 9	@ Predators	4–5	OT 3:12	Vokoun (12–4–1)	Bryzgalov (4–3–2)	11,821	29–9–7	Gaylord Entertainment Center	OTL	65
46	January 11	@ Stars	5–1		Bryzgalov (5–3–2)	Turco (21–15–1)	18,532	30–9–7	American Airlines Center	W	67
47	January 13	Avalanche	2–3	SO	Budaj (13–9–2)	Bryzgalov (5–3–3)	17,174	30–9–8	Honda Center	OTL	68
48	January 16	Blues	2–6		Sanford (3–5–2)	Bryzgalov (5–4–3)	17,174	30–10–8	Honda Center	L	68
49	January 18	@ Oilers	1–4		Roloson (20–17–4)	Bryzgalov (5–5–3)	16,839	30–11–8	Rexall Place	L	68
50	January 19	@ Flames	2–3		Kiprusoff (23–16–3)	Bryzgalov (5–6–3)	19,289	30–12–8	Pengrowth Saddledome	L	68
Jan. 24: All-Star Game (West wins—box)			12–9		Turco (DAL)	Huet (MON)	18,680	18,532	American Airlines Center	Dallas, TX	
51	January 28	Stars	4–1		Giguere (24–4–5)	Turco (24–16–2)	17,331	31–12–8	Honda Center	W	70
52	January 31	Coyotes	2–1		Giguere (25–4–5)	Joseph (12–17–0)	17,174	32–12–8	Honda Center	W	72

February: 5–5–2 (home: 1–1–2; road: 4–4–0)

#	Date	Opponent	Score	OT	Win	Loss	Attendance	Record	Arena	Recap	Points
53	February 3	@ Predators	0–3		Vokoun (16–6–1)	Giguere (25–5–5)	17,113	32–13–8	Gaylord Entertainment Center	L	72
54	February 6	@ Sharks	7–4		Giguere (26–5–5)	Toskala (22–8–1)	17,496	33–13–8	HP Pavilion at San Jose	W	74
55	February 7	Sharks	2–3		Toskala (23–8–1)	Bryzgalov (5–7–3)	17,466	33–14–8	Honda Center	L	74
56	February 10	@ Stars	0–1		Smith (7–3–0)	Giguere (26–6–5)	17,793	33–15–8	American Airlines Center	L	74
57	February 13	@ Avalanche	0–2		Budaj (17–13–3)	Giguere (26–7–5)	17,512	33–16–8	Pepsi Center	L	74
58	February 15	@ Coyotes	5–4	OT 1:53	Giguere (27–7–5)	Joseph (14–20–1)	15,038	34–16–8	Jobing.com Arena	W	76
59	February 17	@ Kings	3–2	SO	Giguere (28–7–5)	Garon (8–7–5)	18,118	35–16–8	Staples Center	W	78
60	February 18	Kings	3–4	SO	Burke (4–3–2)	Giguere (28–7–6)	17,363	35–16–9	Honda Center	OTL	79
61	February 20	Canucks	2–3	OT 2:19	Sabourin (1–3–1)	Giguere (28–7–7)	17,467	35–16–10	Honda Center	OTL	80
62	February 23	@ Stars	1–4		Smith (9–4–0)	Giguere (28–8–7)	17,634	35–17–10	American Airlines Center	L	80
63	February 25	Avalanche	5–3		Giguere (29–8–7)	Theodore (11–14–1)	17,174	36–17–10	Honda Center	W	82
64	February 26	@ Sharks	3–2		Bryzgalov (6–7–3)	Nabokov (14–14–0)	17,496	37–17–10	HP Pavilion at San Jose	W	84

March: 10–3–2 (home: 7–1–1; road: 3–2–1)

#	Date	Opponent	Score	OT	Win	Loss	Attendance	Record	Arena	Recap	Points
65	March 1	@ Kings	3–4	OT 3:17	Burke (6–3–2)	Bryzgalov (6–7–4)	17,620	37–17–11	Staples Center	OTL	85
66	March 2	Sharks	3–1		Giguere (30–8–7)	Nabokov (14–15–1)	17,174	38–17–11	Honda Center	W	87
67	March 4	Predators	3–2	SO	Giguere (31–8–7)	Vokoun (21–8–3)	17,174	39–17–11	Honda Center	W	89
68	March 7	Coyotes	2–1		Giguere (32–8–7)	Tellqvist (10–10–2)	17,174	40–17–11	Honda Center	W	91
69	March 9	Oilers	5–1		Bryzgalov (7–7–4)	Roloson (25–28–5)	17,174	41–17–11	Honda Center	W	93
70	March 11	Canucks	4–2		Giguere (33–8–7)	Luongo (39–20–4)	17,174	42–17–11	Honda Center	W	95
71	March 14	Blue Jackets	5–4	SO	Giguere (34–8–7)	Norrena (19–17–3)	17,174	42–17–12	Honda Center	OTL	96
72	March 16	Blackhawks	5–2		Bryzgalov (8–7–4)	Khabibulin (23–21–5)	17,174	43–17–12	Honda Center	W	98
73	March 18	Kings	3–5		Garon (11–8–6)	Giguere (34–8–8)	17,174	43–18–12	Honda Center	L	98
74	March 22	@ Coyotes	2–1		Joseph (16–27–1)	Bryzgalov (8–8–4)	15,593	43–19–12	Jobing.com Arena	L	98
75	March 23	Stars	3–2	OT 2:28	Giguere (35–8–8)	Turco (32–19–5)	17,174	44–19–12	Honda Center	W	100
76	March 26	@ Red Wings	0–1		Hasek (36–11–7)	Giguere (35–9–8)	20,066	44–20–12	Joe Louis Arena	L	100
77	March 28	@ Blackhawks	3–1		Bryzgalov (9–8–4)	Khabibulin (23–25–5)	11,295	45–20–12	United Center	W	102
78	March 29	@ Blue Jackets	5–2		Giguere (36–9–8)	Norrena (23–20–3)	15,340	46–20–12	Nationwide Arena	W	104
79	March 31	@ Blues	3–2	OT :25	Giguere (37–9–8)	Bacashihua (2–5–3)	18,609	47–20–12	Scottrade Center	W	106

April: 1–0–2 (home: 0–0–1; road: 1–0–1)

#	Date	Opponent	Score	OT	Win	Loss	Attendance	Record	Arena	Recap	Points
80	April 4	Sharks	2–3	SO	Nabokov (24–15–3)	Bryzgalov (9–8–5)	17,174	47–20–13	Honda Center	OTL	107
81	April 6	@ Stars	1–2	SO	Turco (36–20–5)	Bryzgalov (9–8–6)	18,584	47–20–14	American Airlines Center	OTL	108
82	April 7	@ Blue Jackets	4–3		Bryzgalov (10–8–6)	Norrena (24–23–3)	17,391	48–20–14	Nationwide Arena	W	110

Legend: W Win (2 points) L Loss (0 points) OTL Overtime/shootout loss (1 point) All-Star Game

"Points" legend: 1st (Pacific Division) Not in Playoff Position In Playoff Position Clinched playoffs Clinched Division

=== Playoffs ===
2007 Stanley Cup playoffs
Western Conference Quarterfinals vs. (W7) Minnesota Wild – Anaheim wins 4–1

#	Date	Opponent	Score	OT	Win	Loss	Attendance	Series	Arena	Box
1	April 11	Wild	2–1		Bryzgalov (1–0)	Backstrom (0–1)	17,180	1–0	Honda Center	W
2	April 13	Wild	3–2		Bryzgalov (2–0)	Backstrom (0–2)	17,324	2–0	Honda Center	W
3	April 15	@ Wild	2–1		Bryzgalov (3–0)	Backstrom (0–3)	19,224	3–0	Xcel Energy Center	W
4	April 17	@ Wild	1–4		Backstrom (1–3)	Bryzgalov (3–1)	19,174	3–1	Xcel Energy Center	L
5	April 19	Wild	4–1		Giguere (1–0)	Backstrom (1–4)	17,318	4–1	Honda Center	W

Western Conference Semifinals vs. (W3) Vancouver Canucks – Anaheim wins 4–1

#	Date	Opponent	Score	OT	Win	Loss	Attendance	Series	Arena	Box
1	April 25	Canucks	5–1		Giguere (2–0)	Luongo (4–4)	17,250	1–0	Honda Center	W
2	April 27	Canucks	1–2	2OT 27:49	Luongo (5–4)	Giguere (2–1)	17,392	1–1	Honda Center	L
3	April 29	@ Canucks	3–2		Giguere (3–1)	Luongo (5–5)	18,630	2–1	General Motors Place	W
4	May 1	@ Canucks	3–2	1OT 2:07	Giguere (4–1)	Luongo (5–6)	18,630	3–1	General Motors Place	W
5	May 3	Canucks	2–1	2OT 24:30	Giguere (5–1)	Luongo (5–7)	17,407	4–1	Honda Center	W

Western Conference Finals vs. (W1) Detroit Red Wings – Anaheim wins 4–2

#	Date	Opponent	Score	OT	Win	Loss	Attendance	Series	Arena	Box
1	May 11	@ Red Wings	1–2		Hasek (9–4)	Giguere (5–2)	19,939	0–1	Joe Louis Arena	L
2	May 13	@ Red Wings	4–3	1OT 14:17	Giguere (6–2)	Hasek (9–5)	19,620	1–1	Joe Louis Arena	W
3	May 15	Red Wings	0–5		Hasek (10–5)	Giguere (6–3)	17,358	1–2	Honda Center	L
4	May 17	Red Wings	5–3		Giguere (7–3)	Hasek (10–6)	17,375	2–2	Honda Center	W
5	May 20	@ Red Wings	2–1	1OT 11:57	Giguere (8–3)	Hasek (10–7)	20,003	3–2	Joe Louis Arena	W
6	May 22	Red Wings	4–3		Giguere (9–3)	Hasek (10–8)	17,380	4–2	Honda Center	W

Stanley Cup Finals vs. (E4) Ottawa Senators – Anaheim wins 4–1

#	Date	Opponent	Score	OT	Win	Loss	Attendance	Series	Arena	Box
1	May 28	Senators	3–2		Giguere (10–3)	Emery (12–4)	17,274	1–0	Honda Center	W
2	May 30	Senators	1–0		Giguere (11–3)	Emery (12–5)	17,258	2–0	Honda Center	W
3	June 2	@ Senators	3–5		Emery (13–5)	Giguere (11–4)	20,500	2–1	Scotiabank Place	L
4	June 4	@ Senators	3–2		Giguere (12–4)	Emery (13–6)	20,500	3–1	Scotiabank Place	W
5	June 6	Senators	6–2		Giguere (13–4)	Emery (13–7)	17,372	4–1	Honda Center	W

Legend: W Win L Loss

== Player statistics ==
=== Scoring ===
- Position abbreviations: C = Center; D = Defense; G = Goaltender; LW = Left wing; RW = Right wing
- † = Joined team via a transaction (e.g., trade, waivers, signing) during the season. Stats reflect time with the Ducks only.
- ‡ = Left team via a transaction (e.g., trade, waivers, release) during the season. Stats reflect time with the Ducks only.

No.	Player	Pos	Regular season						Playoffs					
No.	Player	Pos	GP	G	A	Pts	+/-	PIM	GP	G	A	Pts	+/-	PIM
8	Teemu Selanne	RW	82	48	46	94	26	82	21	5	10	15	1	10
19	Andy McDonald	C	82	27	51	78	16	46	21	10	4	14	6	10
27	Scott Niedermayer	D	79	15	54	69	6	86	21	3	8	11	2	26
14	Chris Kunitz	LW	81	25	35	60	23	81	13	1	5	6	1	19
25	Chris Pronger	D	66	13	46	59	27	69	19	3	12	15	10	26
15	Ryan Getzlaf	C	82	25	33	58	17	66	21	7	10	17	1	32
17	Dustin Penner	LW	82	29	16	45	−2	58	21	3	5	8	4	2
10	Corey Perry	RW	82	17	27	44	12	55	21	6	9	15	5	37
23	Francois Beauchemin	D	71	7	21	28	7	49	20	4	4	8	2	16
26	Samuel Pahlsson	C	82	8	18	26	−4	42	21	3	9	12	10	20
22	Todd Marchant	C	56	8	15	23	7	44	11	0	3	3	−1	12
32	Travis Moen	LW	82	11	10	21	−4	101	21	7	5	12	5	22
21	Sean O'Donnell	D	79	2	15	17	9	92	21	0	2	2	8	10
44	Rob Niedermayer	C	82	5	11	16	−8	77	21	5	5	10	9	39
37	Shane O'Brien‡	D	62	2	12	14	5	140	—	—	—	—	—	—
38	Ryan Shannon	C	53	2	9	11	−2	10	11	0	0	0	0	6
5	Ric Jackman†	D	24	1	10	11	3	10	7	1	1	2	2	2
45	Shawn Thornton	RW	48	2	7	9	3	88	15	0	0	0	−3	19
33	Joe DiPenta	D	76	2	6	8	1	48	16	0	0	0	0	4
29	Todd Fedoruk‡	LW	10	0	3	3	2	36	—	—	—	—	—	—
40	Kent Huskins	D	33	0	3	3	−3	14	21	0	1	1	4	11
39	Travis Green‡	C	7	1	1	2	3	6	—	—	—	—	—	—
35	Jean-Sebastien Giguere	G	56	0	2	2		0	18	0	0	0		0
47	Tim Brent	C	15	1	0	1	−5	6	—	—	—	—	—	—
46	Curtis Glencross‡	C	2	1	0	1	−1	2	—	—	—	—	—	—
43	Bjorn Melin	RW	3	1	0	1	−1	0	—	—	—	—	—	—
16	George Parros†	RW	32	1	0	1	−2	102	5	0	0	0	0	10
24	Brad May†	LW	14	0	1	1	−1	13	18	0	1	1	−1	28
31	Michael Wall‡	G	4	0	1	1		0	—	—	—	—	—	—
30	Ilya Bryzgalov	G	27	0	0	0		0	5	0	0	0		0
29	Sebastien Caron†	G	1	0	0	0		0	—	—	—	—	—	—
24	Stanislav Chistov‡	LW	1	0	0	0	0	0	—	—	—	—	—	—
13	Mark Hartigan†	C	6	0	0	0	−1	4	1	0	0	0	0	0
18	Ian Moran‡	D	1	0	0	0	−1	0	—	—	—	—	—	—
34	Aaron Rome	D	1	0	0	0	−1	0	1	0	0	0	−2	0
52	Ryan Carter	C	—	—	—	—	—	—	4	0	0	0	−1	0
18	Drew Miller	LW	—	—	—	—	—	—	3	0	0	0	1	2
46	Joe Motzko†	RW	—	—	—	—	—	—	3	0	0	0	0	2

=== Goaltending ===
- † = Joined team via a transaction (e.g., trade, waivers, signing) during the season. Stats reflect time with the Ducks only.
- ‡ = Left team via a transaction (e.g., trade, waivers, release) during the season. Stats reflect time with the Ducks only.

No.	Player	Regular season										Playoffs								
No.	Player	GP	W	L	OT	SA	GA	GAA	SV%	SO	TOI	GP	W	L	SA	GA	GAA	SV%	SO	TOI
35	Jean-Sebastien Giguere	56	36	10	8	1490	122	2.26	.918	4	3245	18	13	4	451	35	1.97	.922	1	1067
30	Ilya Bryzgalov	27	10	8	6	668	62	2.47	.907	1	1509	5	3	1	128	10	2.25	.922	0	267
31	Michael Wall‡	4	2	2	0	81	10	2.97	.877	0	202	—	—	—	—	—	—	—	—	—
29	Sebastien Caron†	1	0	0	0	6	1	2.12	.833	0	28	—	—	—	—	—	—	—	—	—

== Awards and records ==
=== Awards ===
Type	Award/honor	Recipient	Ref
League (annual)	Conn Smythe Trophy	Scott Niedermayer	
League (annual)	NHL First All-Star Team	Scott Niedermayer (Defense)	
League (annual)	NHL Second All-Star Team	Chris Pronger (Defense)	
League (in-season)	NHL All-Star Game selection	Randy Carlyle (coach)	
League (in-season)	NHL All-Star Game selection	Andy McDonald (Note: McDonald was an injury replacement for Henrik Zetterberg of the Detroit Red Wings.)	
League (in-season)	NHL All-Star Game selection	Scott Niedermayer (Note: Niedermayer was voted to the starting lineup, but did not play. He was replaced by Ed Jovanovski of the Phoenix Coyotes.)	
League (in-season)	NHL All-Star Game selection	Teemu Selanne	
League (in-season)	NHL First Star of the Month	Teemu Selanne (November)	
League (in-season)	NHL Second Star of the Week	Jean-Sebastien Giguere (October 22)	
League (in-season)	NHL Second Star of the Week	Teemu Selanne (November 26)	
League (in-season)	NHL Second Star of the Week	Teemu Selanne (February 18)	
League (in-season)	NHL Third Star of the Month	Scott Niedermayer (October)	
League (in-season)	NHL YoungStars Game selection	Ryan Getzlaf	

=== Records ===
On November 9, 2006, the Anaheim Ducks set an NHL open era record by remaining undefeated in regulation for the first 16 games of the season, with 12 wins and four overtime losses. The previous mark was set by the 1984–85 Edmonton Oilers, who had 12 wins and three overtime losses.

=== Milestones ===
Teemu Selanne scored his 500th goal on November 22, becoming only the second Finnish player to reach the mark.

Milestone	Player	Date	Ref
First game	Shane O'Brien	October 6, 2006	
First game	Ryan Shannon	October 6, 2006	
First game	Michael Wall	November 26, 2006	
First game	Kent Huskins	December 23, 2006	
First game	Aaron Rome	January 2, 2007	
First game	Tim Brent	January 5, 2007	
First game	Bjorn Melin	January 7, 2007	
First game	Curtis Glencross	January 13, 2007	
First game	Drew Miller	April 19, 2007	
First game	Ryan Carter	May 17, 2007	
500th goal scored	Teemu Selanne	November 22, 2006	
1,000th game played	Scott Niedermayer	November 28, 2006	
1,000th game played	Teemu Selanne	December 31, 2006	
25th shutout	Jean-Sebastien Giguere	December 6, 2006	

== Transactions ==
The Ducks were involved in the following transactions from June 20, 2006, the day after the deciding game of the 2006 Stanley Cup Finals, through June 6, 2007, the day of the deciding game of the 2007 Stanley Cup Finals.

=== Trades ===
Date	Details		Ref
July 3, 2006	To Anaheim Ducks: Chris Pronger	To Edmonton Oilers: Joffrey Lupul; Ladislav Smid; 1st-round pick in 2007; Conditional 1st-round pick in 2008 (Note: Condition met. Edmonton received this pick when Anaheim defeated the Detroit Red Wings in the 2007 Western Conference Finals on May 22, 2007, to advance to the 2007 Stanley Cup Finals.); 2nd-round pick in 2008	
August 17, 2006	To Anaheim Ducks: Karl Stewart; 2nd-round pick in 2007; Conditional 4th-round pick in 2008	To Atlanta Thrashers: Vitaly Vishnevski	
November 13, 2006	To Anaheim Ducks: Phoenix's 3rd-round pick in 2007 or 2008	To Boston Bruins: Stanislav Chistov	
November 13, 2006	To Anaheim Ducks: 4th-round pick in 2007; Future considerations (Note: Anaheim received the conditional right to switch 2007 5th-round picks with the Flyers, but the condition was not met.)	To Philadelphia Flyers: Todd Fedoruk	
November 13, 2006	To Anaheim Ducks: George Parros; Option to switch 3rd-round picks in 2007	To Colorado Avalanche: 2nd-round pick in 2007	
December 28, 2006	To Anaheim Ducks: Sebastien Caron; Chris Durno; Matt Keith	To Chicago Blackhawks: P. A. Parenteau; Bruno St. Jacques	
January 3, 2007	To Anaheim Ducks: Ric Jackman	To Florida Panthers: Conditional draft pick in 2007	
January 24, 2007	To Anaheim Ducks: Joe Rullier	To Vancouver Canucks: Colby Genoway	
January 26, 2007	To Anaheim Ducks: Mark Hartigan; Joe Motzko; 4th-round pick in 2007	To Columbus Blue Jackets: Curtis Glencross; Zenon Konopka; 7th-round pick in 2007 or 2008 (Note: Anaheim's choice.)	
January 26, 2007	To Anaheim Ducks: Shane Endicott	To Nashville Predators: Chris Durno	
February 23, 2007	To Anaheim Ducks: Future considerations	To Dallas Stars: Shane Endicott	
February 24, 2007	To Anaheim Ducks: Gerald Coleman; 1st-round pick in 2007	To Tampa Bay Lightning: Shane O'Brien; 3rd-round pick in 2007	
February 27, 2007	To Anaheim Ducks: Brad May	To Colorado Avalanche: Michael Wall	
February 27, 2007	To Anaheim Ducks: Doug O'Brien	To Tampa Bay Lightning: Joe Rullier	

=== Players acquired ===
Date	Player	Former team	Term	Via	Ref
July 11, 2006	Colby Genoway	Hartford Wolf Pack (AHL)	2-year	Free agency	
July 11, 2006	Clay Wilson	Grand Rapids Griffins (AHL)	2-year	Free agency	
July 12, 2006	Ryan Carter	Minnesota State University, Mankato (WCHA)	2-year	Free agency	
July 13, 2006	Michael Leighton	Buffalo Sabres	1-year	Free agency	
July 14, 2006	Shawn Thornton	Chicago Blackhawks	1-year	Free agency	
August 10, 2006	Travis Green	Boston Bruins	1-year	Free agency	
August 15, 2006	Ian Moran	Boston Bruins	1-year	Free agency	
February 23, 2007	Mike Hoffman	Portland Pirates (AHL)	2-year	Free agency	
March 27, 2007	Ryan Dingle	University of Denver (WCHA)	2-year	Free agency	
May 16, 2007	Andrew Ebbett	Binghamton Senators (AHL)	1-year	Free agency	
May 25, 2007	Jonas Hiller	HC Davos (NLA)	1-year	Free agency	

=== Players lost ===
Date	Player	New team	Via (Note: In parentheses is the player's free agency group on July 1 if applicable.)	Ref
June 27, 2006	Tyler Wright	EHC Basel (NLA) (Note: Wright briefly played with EHC Basel during the 2006–07 season.)	Buyout	
July 2, 2006	Ruslan Salei	Florida Panthers	Free agency (III)	
July 5, 2006	Jeff Friesen	Calgary Flames	Free agency (III)	
July 26, 2006	Zenon Konopka	HC Lada Togliatti (RSL)	Free agency (II) (Note: Anaheim retained Konopka's NHL rights and re-signed him on October 7.)	
August 7, 2006	Jonathan Hedstrom	Timra IK (SHL) (Note: Hedstrom signed with Timra IK on August 15.)	Retirement (Note: Hedstrom retired from the NHL.)	
August 18, 2006	Maxim Kondratiev	HC Lada Togliatti (RSL)	Free agency (II) (Note: Anaheim retained Kondratiev's NHL rights and re-signed him on July 4, 2007.)	
September 12, 2006	Aaron Gavey	Kolner Haie (DEL)	Free agency (III)	
September 14, 2006	Igor Pohanka	HC Sparta Praha (ELH)	Free agency (UFA)	
September 27, 2006	Karl Stewart	Pittsburgh Penguins	Waivers	
October 2006	Kip Brennan	Toronto Marlies (AHL)	Free agency (UFA)	
November 27, 2006	Michael Leighton	Nashville Predators	Waivers	
January 10, 2007	Travis Green	Toronto Maple Leafs	Waivers	
January 25, 2007	Ian Moran	Eisbaren Berlin (DEL)	Free agency	

=== Signings ===
Date	Player	Term	Contract type	Ref
July 5, 2006	Andy McDonald	3-year	Re-signing	
July 10, 2006	Stanislav Chistov	2-year	Re-signing	
July 14, 2006	P. A. Parenteau	1-year	Re-signing	
July 20, 2006	Chris Kunitz	2-year	Re-signing	
July 27, 2006	Trevor Gillies		Re-signing	
July 27, 2006	Kent Huskins	1-year	Re-signing	
July 27, 2006	Petteri Wirtanen	3-year	Entry-level	
July 30, 2006	Vitali Vishnevski	1-year	Arbitration award	
August 2, 2006	Brian Salcido	3-year	Entry-level	
August 3, 2006	Sean O'Brien	1-year	Re-signing	
August 16, 2006	Francois Beauchemin	2-year	Extension	
August 28, 2006	Bruno St. Jacques	1-year	Re-signing	
September 6, 2006	Ilya Bryzgalov	2-year	Re-signing	
October 7, 2006	Zenon Konopka	2-year	Re-signing	
October 8, 2006	Samuel Pahlsson	2-year	Extension	
November 30, 2006	Brendan Mikkelson	3-year	Entry-level	
December 19, 2006	Jean-Philippe Levasseur	3-year	Entry-level	
March 16, 2007	Bobby Bolt	3-year	Entry-level	

== Draft picks ==
Anaheim's picks at the 2006 NHL entry draft in Vancouver, British Columbia.

Round	#	Player	Nationality	NHL team	College/junior/club team (league)
1	19	Mark Mitera (D)	Canada	Anaheim Ducks	University of Michigan (CCHA)
2	38	Bryce Swan (RW)	Canada	Anaheim Ducks (from New York Islanders via Vancouver)	Halifax Mooseheads (QMJHL)
3	83	John de Gray (D)	Canada	Anaheim Ducks (from San Jose via New York Rangers)	Brampton Battalion (OHL)
4	112	Matt Beleskey (LW)	Canada	Anaheim Ducks	Belleville Bulls (OHL)
6	172	Petteri Wirtanen (C)	Finland	Anaheim Ducks	HPK (Finland)

== Farm teams ==
=== Portland Pirates ===
The Portland Pirates were Anaheim's affiliate in the AHL for the 2006–07 season.

=== Augusta Lynx ===
The Augusta Lynx were Anaheim's ECHL affiliate for the 2006–07 season.

== Broadcasters ==
=== Local TV ===
Channel	Play-by-play	Color commentator	Rinkside reporter	Studio host	Studio analyst
KDOC-TV 56	John Ahlers	Brian Hayward			

=== Local cable TV ===
Cable TV	Play-by-play	Color commentator	Rinkside reporter	Studio host	Studio analyst
Fox Sports Prime Ticket	John Ahlers	Brian Hayward			

=== Local radio ===
Flagship station	Play-by-play	Color commentator	Studio host
KLAA–AM 830	Steve Carroll	Dan Wood	

== See also ==
- 2006–07 NHL season
- 2007 Stanley Cup Finals
