= 2006–07 Colorado Avalanche season =

National Hockey League team season

2006–07 Colorado Avalanche
- Division: 4th Northwest
- Conference: 9th Western
- 2006–07 record: 44–31–7
- Home record: 22–16–3
- Road record: 22–15–4
- Goals for: 272
- Goals against: 251

Team information
- General manager: Francois Giguere
- Coach: Joel Quenneville
- Captain: Joe Sakic
- Alternate captains: Andrew Brunette; Ian Laperriere
- Arena: Pepsi Center
- Average attendance: 17,612
- Minor league affiliates: Albany River Rats; Arizona Sundogs

Team leaders
- Goals: Joe Sakic (36)
- Assists: Joe Sakic (64)
- Points: Joe Sakic (100)
- Penalty minutes: Ian Laperriere (133)
- Plus/minus: Ken Klee (+18)
- Wins: Peter Budaj (31)
- Goals against average: Peter Budaj (2.68)

The 2006–07 Colorado Avalanche season was their 12th season in Denver. It was a season of transition for the Avs, as the team began the season with a new general manager in Francois Giguere, ending the 12-year reign of Pierre Lacroix. The off-season also featured the departures of Alex Tanguay and Rob Blake, continuing the trend of star players leaving Denver that began the previous year.

After a decade near the top of the Western Conference standings, the Avalanche were expected to struggle to make the playoffs in 2006–07. The team's expected decline also saw attendance take a hit, as Colorado's NHL record sellout streak of 487 games was ended on October 16 when 17,681 tickets were sold for a game, 326 shy of a sellout.

Joe Sakic was the lone representative for the Avalanche at the 2007 All-Star Game in Dallas. Sakic recorded four assists at the game.

Entering the final week of the season on April 3, 2007, Colorado was seven points behind the Calgary Flames for the eighth and final spot in the Western Conference standings. Needing Calgary to lose all four games that week and for them to win all four they fell short by one point. Calgary losing to Colorado, San Jose, Edmonton, and again to Colorado did not capture a point that week and Colorado winning three out of four was knocked out of contention when they lost to the Nashville Predators on April 7, 2007. The season finale the following night, the Avalanche beat the Flames 6–3 giving them 95 points overall on the season and one short of Calgary who had 96. With the 95 points, the Avalanche became the team with the highest point total in a season to not make the playoffs, missing the post-season for the first time since 1994 back when they were known as the Quebec Nordiques, despite going 15–2–2 to end the regular season. This record would later be matched by the 2010–11 Dallas Stars, who also failed to qualify for the playoffs with 95 points. Both the Avalanche and the 2011 Stars were passed by the 2014–15 Boston Bruins, the 2017–18 Florida Panthers, the 2018–19 Montreal Canadiens, and the 2024–25 Calgary Flames, who each earned 96 and didn’t make the playoffs.

== Regular season ==
=== Season standings ===
Northwest Division
| No. | CR | | GP | W | L | OTL | GF | GA | Pts |
|---|---|---|---|---|---|---|---|---|---|
| 1 | 3 | **Vancouver Canucks** | 82 | 49 | 26 | 7 | 222 | 201 | 105 |
| 2 | 7 | **Minnesota Wild** | 82 | 48 | 26 | 8 | 235 | 191 | 104 |
| 3 | 8 | **Calgary Flames** | 82 | 43 | 29 | 10 | 258 | 226 | 96 |
| 4 | 9 | Colorado Avalanche | 82 | 44 | 31 | 7 | 272 | 251 | 95 |
| 5 | 12 | Edmonton Oilers | 82 | 32 | 43 | 7 | 195 | 248 | 71 |

Note: CR = Conference rank; GP = Games played; W = Wins; L = Losses; T = Ties; OTL = Overtime/shootout loss; GF = Goals for; GA = Goals against; PIM = Penalties in minutes; Pts = Points
Bolded teams qualified for the playoffs.

Western Conference
| R | | Div | GP | W | L | OTL | GF | GA | Pts |
|---|---|---|---|---|---|---|---|---|---|
| **1** | **z-Detroit Red Wings** | **CE** | **82** | **50** | **19** | **13** | **254** | **199** | **113** |
| **2** | **y-Anaheim Ducks** | **PA** | **82** | **48** | **20** | **14** | **258** | **208** | **110** |
| **3** | **y-Vancouver Canucks** | **NW** | **82** | **49** | **26** | **7** | **222** | **201** | **105** |
| **4** | **Nashville Predators** | **CE** | **82** | **51** | **23** | **8** | **272** | **212** | **110** |
| **5** | **San Jose Sharks** | **PA** | **82** | **51** | **26** | **5** | **258** | **199** | **107** |
| **6** | **Dallas Stars** | **PA** | **82** | **50** | **25** | **7** | **226** | **197** | **107** |
| **7** | **Minnesota Wild** | **NW** | **82** | **48** | **26** | **8** | **235** | **191** | **104** |
| **8** | **Calgary Flames** | **NW** | **82** | **43** | **29** | **10** | **258** | **226** | **96** |
8.5
| 9 | Colorado Avalanche | NW | 82 | 44 | 31 | 7 | 272 | 251 | 95 |
| 10 | St. Louis Blues | CE | 82 | 34 | 35 | 13 | 214 | 254 | 81 |
| 11 | Columbus Blue Jackets | CE | 82 | 33 | 42 | 7 | 201 | 249 | 73 |
| 12 | Edmonton Oilers | NW | 82 | 32 | 43 | 7 | 195 | 248 | 71 |
| 13 | Chicago Blackhawks | CE | 82 | 31 | 42 | 9 | 201 | 258 | 71 |
| 14 | Los Angeles Kings | PA | 82 | 27 | 41 | 14 | 227 | 283 | 68 |
| 15 | Phoenix Coyotes | PA | 82 | 31 | 46 | 5 | 216 | 284 | 67 |

bold - qualified for playoffs, y - division title, z - best conference record
CE - Central Division, NW - Northwest Division, PA - Pacific Division

== Schedule and results ==
2006–07 regular season
October: 5–4–2 (home: 3–3–1; road: 2–1–1)

| Game | Date | Visitor | Score | Home | OT | Decision | Attendance | Record | Points | Recap |
|---|---|---|---|---|---|---|---|---|---|---|
| 1 | October 4 | Dallas | 3 – 2 | Colorado | OT | Theodore | 18,007 | 0–0–1 | 1 | OTL |
| 2 | October 5 | Colorado | 2 – 3 | Minnesota | OT | Budaj | 18,568 | 0–0–2 | 2 | OTL |
| 3 | October 8 | Vancouver | 2 – 3 | Colorado | | Theodore | 18,007 | 1–0–2 | 4 | W |
| 4 | October 14 | Edmonton | 4 – 3 | Colorado | | Theodore | 18,007 | 1–1–2 | 4 | L |
| 5 | October 16 | Chicago | 5 – 3 | Colorado | | Theodore | 17,681 | 1–2–2 | 4 | L |
| 6 | October 18 | Colorado | 4 – 1 | Toronto | | Budaj | 19,463 | 2–2–2 | 6 | W |
| 7 | October 19 | Colorado | 2 – 1 | Ottawa | | Theodore | 17,728 | 3–2–2 | 8 | W |
| 8 | October 21 | Colorado | 5 – 8 | Montreal | | Theodore | 21,273 | 3–3–2 | 8 | L |
| 9 | October 23 | Los Angeles | 1 – 6 | Colorado | | Budaj | 17,284 | 4–3–2 | 10 | W |
| 10 | October 25 | Washington | 5 – 3 | Colorado | | Budaj | 17,047 | 4–4–2 | 10 | L |
| 11 | October 29 | Minnesota | 1 – 4 | Colorado | | Theodore | 17,615 | 5–4–2 | 12 | W |

November: 7–7–0 (home: 3–3–0; road: 4–4–0)

| Game | Date | Visitor | Score | Home | OT | Decision | Attendance | Record | Point | Recap |
|---|---|---|---|---|---|---|---|---|---|---|
| 12 | November 1 | Colorado | 5 – 3 | Columbus | | Theodore | 16,007 | 6–4–2 | 14 | W |
| 13 | November 2 | Colorado | 1 – 4 | St. Louis | | Budaj | 9,467 | 6–5–2 | 14 | L |
| 14 | November 4 | Vancouver | 2 – 3 | Colorado | | Theodore | 18,007 | 7–5–2 | 16 | W |
| 15 | November 7 | Los Angeles | 6 – 5 | Colorado | | Budaj | 17,196 | 7–6–2 | 16 | L |
| 16 | November 11 | Colorado | 0 – 1 | Nashville | | Theodore | 17,113 | 7–7–2 | 16 | L |
| 17 | November 13 | Edmonton | 2 – 1 | Colorado | | Theodore | 17,725 | 7–8–2 | 16 | L |
| 18 | November 15 | San Jose | 4 – 3 | Colorado | | Theodore | 18,007 | 7–9–2 | 16 | L |
| 19 | November 17 | Colorado | 3 – 0 | Columbus | | Budaj | 16,375 | 8–9–2 | 18 | W |
| 20 | November 18 | Colorado | 2 – 1 | Minnesota | SO | Budaj | 18,568 | 9–9–2 | 20 | W |
| 21 | November 20 | Colorado | 4 – 5 | Dallas | | Budaj | 17,491 | 9–10–2 | 20 | L |
| 22 | November 22 | Anaheim | 2 – 3 | Colorado | SO | Theodore | 17,104 | 10–10–2 | 22 | W |
| 23 | November 25 | Vancouver | 1 – 4 | Colorado | | Theodore | 17,825 | 11–10–2 | 24 | W |
| 24 | November 28 | Colorado | 2 – 5 | Calgary | | Theodore | 19,289 | 11–11–2 | 24 | L |
| 25 | November 30 | Colorado | 7 – 3 | Edmonton | | Budaj | 16,839 | 12–11–2 | 26 | W |

December: 6–7–0 (home: 4–3–0; road: 2–4–0)

| Game | Date | Visitor | Score | Home | OT | Decision | Attendance | Record | Points | Recap |
|---|---|---|---|---|---|---|---|---|---|---|
| 26 | December 2 | Colorado | 1 – 2 | Vancouver | | Budaj | 18,630 | 12–12–2 | 26 | L |
| 27 | December 5 | Columbus | 3 – 0 | Colorado | | Budaj | 17,339 | 12–13–2 | 26 | L |
| 28 | December 7 | Colorado | 5 – 2 | San Jose | | Theodore | 17,039 | 13–13–2 | 28 | W |
| 29 | December 9 | Colorado | 4 – 5 | Los Angeles | | Theodore | 17,079 | 13–14–2 | 28 | L |
| 30 | December 11 | Carolina | 2 – 5 | Colorado | | Budaj | 17,113 | 14–14–2 | 30 | W |
| 31 | December 13 | St. Louis | 1 – 4 | Colorado | | Budaj | 18,007 | 15–14–2 | 32 | W |
| 32 | December 15 | Edmonton | 1 – 4 | Colorado | | Budaj | 17,589 | 16–14–2 | 34 | W |
| 33 | December 17 | Colorado | 1 – 2 | Chicago | | Theodore | 11,111 | 16–15–2 | 34 | L |
| 34 | December 19 | Colorado | 7 – 6 | Edmonton | | Budaj | 16,839 | 17–15–2 | 36 | W |
| | December 21 | Calgary | PPD^{†} | Colorado | | | | | | |
| 35 | December 23 | Chicago | 2 – 3 | Colorado | | Theodore | 17,347 | 18–15–2 | 38 | W |
| 36 | December 27 | Dallas | 5 – 4 | Colorado | | Theodore | 18,007 | 18–16–2 | 38 | L |
| 37 | December 29 | St. Louis | 4 – 2 | Colorado | | Budaj | 18,007 | 18–17–2 | 38 | L |
| 38 | December 30 | Colorado | 0 – 2 | St. Louis | | Budaj | 16,078 | 18–18–2 | 38 | L |
^{†}December 21 game against Calgary was postponed due to a snowstorm. The game was made up on April 8.

January: 7–3–2 (home: 4–1–2; road: 3–2–0)

| Game | Date | Visitor | Score | Home | OT | Decision | Attendance | Record | Points | Recap |
|---|---|---|---|---|---|---|---|---|---|---|
| 39 | January 1 | Colorado | 5 – 3 | Nashville | | Budaj | 15,878 | 19–18–2 | 40 | W |
| 40 | January 5 | Tampa Bay | 2 – 4 | Colorado | | Budaj | 18,007 | 20–18–2 | 42 | W |
| 41 | January 6 | Colorado | 2 – 1 | Minnesota | SO | Budaj | 18,568 | 21–18–2 | 44 | W |
| 42 | January 9 | Detroit | 4 – 3 | Colorado | SO | Budaj | 18,007 | 21–18–3 | 45 | OTL |
| 43 | January 11 | Calgary | 7 – 3 | Colorado | | Budaj | 18,007 | 21–19–3 | 45 | L |
| 44 | January 13 | Colorado | 3 – 2 | Anaheim | SO | Budaj | 17,174 | 22–19–3 | 47 | W |
| 45 | January 15 | Colorado | 1 – 3 | San Jose | | Budaj | 17,496 | 22–20–3 | 47 | L |
| 46 | January 17 | Phoenix | 3 – 4 | Colorado | | Budaj | 17,183 | 23–20–3 | 49 | W |
| 47 | January 20 | Detroit | 1 – 3 | Colorado | | Budaj | 18,007 | 24–20–3 | 51 | W |
| 48 | January 26 | Phoenix | 5 – 4 | Colorado | SO | Budaj | 18,007 | 24–20–4 | 52 | OTL |
| 49 | January 28 | Colorado | 1 – 3 | Detroit | | Theodore | 20,066 | 24–21–4 | 52 | L |
| 50 | January 30 | Nashville | 3 – 4 | Colorado | | Budaj | 17,119 | 25–21–4 | 54 | W |

February: 5–8–1 (home: 4–4–0; road: 1–4–1)

| Game | Date | Visitor | Score | Home | OT | Decision | Attendance | Record | Points | Recap |
|---|---|---|---|---|---|---|---|---|---|---|
| 51 | February 1 | Minnesota | 5 – 3 | Colorado | | Budaj | 17,286 | 25–22–5 | 54 | L |
| 52 | February 3 | Edmonton | 3 – 2 | Colorado | | Budaj | 17,645 | 25–23–5 | 54 | L |
| 53 | February 6 | Florida | 4 – 5 | Colorado | OT | Theodore | 17,065 | 26–23–5 | 56 | W |
| 54 | February 8 | Atlanta | 6 – 3 | Colorado | | Budaj | 17,428 | 26–24–5 | 56 | L |
| 55 | February 11 | Colorado | 5 – 7 | Dallas | | Theodore | 17,506 | 26–25–5 | 56 | L |
| 56 | February 13 | Anaheim | 0 – 2 | Colorado | | Budaj | 17,512 | 27–25–4 | 58 | W |
| 57 | February 15 | Colorado | 7 – 5 | Calgary | | Theodore | 19,289 | 28–25–4 | 60 | W |
| 58 | February 17 | Colorado | 2 – 5 | Calgary | | Budaj | 19,289 | 28–26–4 | 60 | L |
| 59 | February 18 | Colorado | 4 – 5 | Vancouver | | Theodore | 18,630 | 28–27–4 | 60 | L |
| 60 | February 20 | Calgary | 3 – 4 | Colorado | | Budaj | 17,623 | 29–27–4 | 62 | W |
| 61 | February 22 | Minnesota | 4 – 3 | Colorado | | Budaj | 18,007 | 29–28–4 | 62 | L |
| 62 | February 24 | Colorado | 5 – 6 | Los Angeles | SO | Budaj | 18,118 | 29–28–5 | 63 | OTL |
| 63 | February 25 | Colorado | 3 – 5 | Anaheim | | Theodore | 17,174 | 29–29–5 | 63 | L |
| 64 | February 27 | Columbus | 2 – 3 | Colorado | | Budaj | 17,127 | 30–29–5 | 65 | W |

March: 11–1–2 (home: 3–1–0; road: 8–0–2)

| Game | Date | Visitor | Score | Home | OT | Decision | Attendance | Record | Points | Recap |
|---|---|---|---|---|---|---|---|---|---|---|
| 65 | March 1 | Colorado | 6 – 1 | Chicago | | Budaj | 10,522 | 31–29–5 | 67 | W |
| 66 | March 4 | Colorado | 4 – 3 | Detroit | OT | Budaj | 20,066 | 32–29–5 | 69 | W |
| 67 | March 6 | Colorado | 2 – 0 | Boston | | Budaj | 11,707 | 33–29–5 | 71 | W |
| 68 | March 7 | Colorado | 3 – 2 | Buffalo | | Budaj | 18,690 | 34–29–5 | 73 | W |
| 69 | March 11 | Colorado | 2 – 3 | Minnesota | SO | Budaj | 18,568 | 34–29–6 | 74 | OTL |
| 70 | March 14 | Calgary | 2 – 3 | Colorado | | Budaj | 17,426 | 35–29–6 | 76 | W |
| 71 | March 17 | Colorado | 6 – 3 | Phoenix | | Budaj | 17,179 | 36–29–6 | 78 | W |
| 72 | March 18 | San Jose | 3 – 4 | Colorado | SO | Budaj | 18,007 | 37–29–6 | 80 | W |
| 73 | March 21 | Colorado | 5 – 1 | Edmonton | | Budaj | 16,839 | 38–29–6 | 82 | W |
| 74 | March 23 | Colorado | 3 – 4 | Edmonton | SO | Budaj | 16,839 | 38–29–7 | 83 | OTL |
| 75 | March 25 | Colorado | 5 – 4 | Vancouver | SO | Theodore | 18,630 | 39–29–7 | 85 | W |
| 76 | March 27 | Vancouver | 3 – 0 | Colorado | | Theodore | 17,437 | 39–30–7 | 85 | L |
| 77 | March 29 | Colorado | 4 – 3 | Phoenix | | Budaj | 16,110 | 40–30–7 | 87 | W |
| 78 | March 31 | Minnesota | 1 – 2 | Colorado | | Budaj | 17,192 | 41–30–7 | 89 | W |

April: 3–1–0 (home: 1–1–0; road: 2–0–0)

| Game | Date | Visitor | Score | Home | OT | Decision | Attendance | Record | Points | Recap |
|---|---|---|---|---|---|---|---|---|---|---|
| 79 | April 3 | Colorado | 4 – 3 | Calgary | | Budaj | 19,289 | 42–30–7 | 91 | W |
| 80 | April 5 | Colorado | 3 – 1 | Vancouver | | Budaj | 18,630 | 43–30–7 | 93 | W |
| 81 | April 7 | Nashville | 4 – 2 | Colorado | | Budaj | 17,462 | 43–31–7 | 93 | L |
| 82 | April 8^{†} | Calgary | 3 – 6 | Colorado | | Theodore | 17,551 | 44–31–7 | 95 | W |
^{†}Makeup date for the December 21 game that was postponed.

Legend: W Win (2 points) L Loss (0 points) OTL Overtime/shootout loss (1 point)

== Player statistics ==
=== Scoring ===
- Position abbreviations: C = Center; D = Defense; G = Goaltender; LW = Left wing; RW = Right wing
- † = Joined team via a transaction (e.g., trade, waivers, signing) during the season. Stats reflect time with the Avalanche only.
- ‡ = Left team via a transaction (e.g., trade, waivers, release) during the season. Stats reflect time with the Avalanche only.

| No. | Player | Pos | Regular season | | | | | |
| No. | Player | Pos | GP | G | A | Pts | +/- | PIM |
|---|---|---|---|---|---|---|---|---|
| 19 | Joe Sakic | C | 82 | 36 | 64 | 100 | 2 | 46 |
| 15 | Andrew Brunette | LW | 82 | 27 | 56 | 83 | −8 | 36 |
| 26 (Note: Stastny wore number 62 in his first seven games.) | Paul Stastny | C | 82 | 28 | 50 | 78 | 4 | 42 |
| 23 | Milan Hejduk | RW | 80 | 35 | 35 | 70 | 10 | 44 |
| 8 | Wojtek Wolski | LW | 76 | 22 | 28 | 50 | 2 | 14 |
| 39 | Tyler Arnason | C | 82 | 16 | 33 | 49 | −8 | 26 |
| 4 (Note: Liles wore number 26 in his first seven games.) | John-Michael Liles | D | 71 | 14 | 30 | 44 | 0 | 24 |
| 5 | Brett Clark | D | 82 | 10 | 29 | 39 | 5 | 50 |
| 53 | Brett McLean | C | 78 | 15 | 20 | 35 | 8 | 36 |
| 40 | Marek Svatos | RW | 66 | 15 | 15 | 30 | 1 | 46 |
| 14 | Ian Laperriere | RW | 81 | 8 | 21 | 29 | 5 | 133 |
| 12 | Brad Richardson | RW | 73 | 14 | 8 | 22 | 4 | 28 |
| 2 | Ken Klee | D | 81 | 3 | 16 | 19 | 18 | 68 |
| 20 | Mark Rycroft | RW | 66 | 6 | 6 | 12 | 3 | 31 |
| 28 | Ben Guite | RW | 39 | 3 | 8 | 11 | −4 | 16 |
| 71 | Patrice Brisebois | D | 33 | 1 | 10 | 11 | −5 | 22 |
| 3 | Karlis Skrastins | D | 68 | 0 | 11 | 11 | 0 | 30 |
| 27 | Ossi Vaananen | D | 74 | 2 | 6 | 8 | 6 | 69 |
| 87 | Pierre Turgeon | C | 17 | 4 | 3 | 7 | −1 | 10 |
| 34 | Kurt Sauer | D | 48 | 0 | 6 | 6 | −3 | 24 |
| 44 | Jordan Leopold | D | 15 | 2 | 3 | 5 | −4 | 14 |
| 6 | Jeff Finger | D | 22 | 1 | 4 | 5 | 10 | 11 |
| 24 | Antti Laaksonen | LW | 41 | 3 | 1 | 4 | −3 | 16 |
| 10 | Brad May‡ | LW | 10 | 0 | 3 | 3 | 0 | 8 |
| 48 | Kyle Cumiskey | D | 9 | 1 | 1 | 2 | 0 | 2 |
| 29 | Scott Parker† | RW | 10 | 1 | 1 | 2 | 0 | 6 |
| 31 | Peter Budaj | G | 57 | 0 | 2 | 2 | | 0 |
| 11 | Cody McCormick | C | 6 | 0 | 1 | 1 | 1 | 6 |
| 60 | Jose Theodore | G | 33 | 0 | 1 | 1 | | 6 |
| 57 | George Parros‡ | RW | 2 | 0 | 0 | 0 | −1 | 0 |

=== Goaltending ===
| No. | Player | Regular season | | | | | | | | | |
| No. | Player | GP | W | L | OT | SA | GA | GAA | SV% | SO | TOI |
|---|---|---|---|---|---|---|---|---|---|---|---|
| 31 | Peter Budaj | 57 | 31 | 16 | 6 | 1499 | 143 | 2.68 | .905 | 3 | 3199 |
| 60 | Jose Theodore | 33 | 13 | 15 | 1 | 870 | 95 | 3.26 | .891 | 0 | 1748 |

== Awards and records ==
=== Awards ===
| Type | Award/honor | Recipient | Ref |
|---|---|---|---|
| League (annual) | NHL Foundation Player Award | Joe Sakic | |
| League (annual) | NHL All-Rookie Team | Paul Stastny (Forward) | |
| League (in-season) | NHL All-Star Game selection | Joe Sakic (Note: Sakic was voted to the starting lineup.) | |
| League (in-season) | NHL First Star of the Month | Peter Budaj (March) | |
| League (in-season) | NHL Rookie of the Month | Wojtek Wolski (December) | |
| League (in-season) | NHL Rookie of the Month | Paul Stastny (February) | |
| League (in-season) | NHL Second Star of the Week | Joe Sakic (March 18) | |
| League (in-season) | NHL Second Star of the Week | Joe Sakic (April 18) | |
| League (in-season) | NHL Third Star of the Week | Joe Sakic (February 18) | |
| League (in-season) | NHL Third Star of the Week | Peter Budaj (March 4) | |
| League (in-season) | NHL YoungStars Game selection | Peter Budaj | |
| League (in-season) | NHL YoungStars Game selection | Wojtek Wolski | |

=== Milestones ===
| Milestone | Player | Date | Ref |
|---|---|---|---|
| First game | Paul Stastny | October 4, 2006 | |
| First game | Kyle Cumiskey | January 1, 2007 | |
| First game | Jeff Finger | February 20, 2007 | |

== Transactions ==
The Avalanche were involved in the following transactions from June 20, 2006, the day after the deciding game of the 2006 Stanley Cup Finals, through June 6, 2007, the day of the deciding game of the 2007 Stanley Cup Finals.

=== Trades ===
| Date | Details | | Ref |
|---|---|---|---|
| June 24, 2006 | To Colorado Avalanche: Jordan Leopold; 2nd-round pick in 2006; Conditional 2nd-round pick in 2007 or 2008 | To Calgary Flames: Alex Tanguay | |
| June 24, 2006 | To Colorado Avalanche: Edmonton's 4th-round pick in 2006 | To New York Islanders: 5th-round pick in 2006; 6th-round pick in 2006 | |
| November 13, 2006 | To Colorado Avalanche: 2nd-round pick in 2007 | To Anaheim Ducks: George Parros; Option to switch 3rd-round picks in 2007 | |
| February 27, 2007 | To Colorado Avalanche: Michael Wall | To Anaheim Ducks: Brad May | |
| February 27, 2007 | To Colorado Avalanche: Scott Parker | To San Jose Sharks: 6th-round pick in 2008 | |

=== Players acquired ===
| Date | Player | Former team | Term | Via | Ref |
|---|---|---|---|---|---|
| July 1, 2006 | Tyler Arnason | Ottawa Senators | 1-year | Free agency | |
| July 6, 2006 | Cody McLeod | Lowell Lock Monsters (AHL) | 2-year | Free agency | |
| July 12, 2006 | Ben Guite | Boston Bruins | | Free agency | |
| July 12, 2006 | Matt Murley | Pittsburgh Penguins | | Free agency | |
| July 12, 2006 | Mark Rycroft | St. Louis Blues | | Free agency | |
| July 24, 2006 | Ken Klee | New Jersey Devils | | Free agency | |
| October 3, 2006 | George Parros | Los Angeles Kings | | Waivers | |
| June 1, 2007 | Jaroslav Hlinka | HC Sparta Praha (ELH) | 1-year | Free agency | |

=== Players lost ===
| Date | Player | New team | Via (Note: In parentheses is the player's free agency group on July 1 if applicable.) | Ref |
|---|---|---|---|---|
| July 1, 2006 | Rob Blake | Los Angeles Kings | Free agency (III) | |
| July 1, 2006 | Tomas Slovak | Mora IK (SHL) | Free agency (UFA) | |
| July 3, 2006 | Dan Hinote | St. Louis Blues | Free agency (III) | |
| July 6, 2006 | Vitali Kolesnik | Khimik Moscow Oblast (RSL) | Free agency (II) (Note: Colorado retained Kolesnik's NHL rights through the 2007–08 season.) | |
| September 5, 2006 | Paul Healey | Linkoping HC (SHL) | Free agency (III) | |
| September 7, 2006 | Frantisek Skladany | HC Energie Karlovy Vary (ELH) | Free agency (UFA) | |
| September 29, 2006 | Steve Konowalchuk | | Retirement | |
| November 2, 2006 | Jim Dowd | New Jersey Devils | Free agency (III) | |
| November 15, 2006 | Tom Lawson | Lukko (Liiga) | Free agency (UFA) | |

=== Signings ===
| Date | Player | Term | Contract type | Ref |
|---|---|---|---|---|
| June 20, 2006 | Joe Sakic | 1-year | Re-signing | |
| June 27, 2006 | Antti Laaksonen | 1-year | Option exercised | |
| June 27, 2006 | Ossi Vaananen | 1-year | Re-signing | |
| June 30, 2006 | Brett Clark | multi-year | Re-signing | |
| June 30, 2006 | Karlis Skrastins | multi-year | Re-signing | |
| July 10, 2006 | Kurt Sauer | 1-year | Re-signing | |
| July 12, 2006 | Jeff Finger | | Re-signing | |
| July 12, 2006 | John-Michael Liles | 2-year | Re-signing | |
| July 13, 2006 | Peter Budaj | 3-year | Re-signing | |
| July 13, 2006 | Cody McCormick | | Re-signing | |
| July 24, 2006 | Paul Stastny | multi-year | Entry-level | |
| August 4, 2006 | Brett McLean | 1-year | Re-signing | |
| September 5, 2006 | Marek Svatos | 1-year | Re-signing | |
| September 12, 2006 | Andrew Brunette | 1-year | Extension | |
| April 3, 2007 | Chris Stewart | 3-year | Entry-level | |
| April 9, 2007 | Joe Sakic | 1-year | Extension | |
| April 11, 2007 | T. J. Hensick | 3-year | Entry-level | |
| April 11, 2007 | Ray Macias | 3-year | Entry-level | |
| May 8, 2007 | Codey Burki | 3-year | Entry-level | |
| May 21, 2007 | Jeff Finger | 1-year | Extension | |
| May 21, 2007 | David Jones | 2-year | Entry-level | |
| May 21, 2007 | Jordan Leopold | 2-year | Extension | |
| May 21, 2007 | Kurt Sauer | 1-year | Extension | |

== Draft picks ==
Colorado's picks at the 2006 NHL entry draft in Vancouver, British Columbia.

| Round | # | Player | Nationality | NHL team | College/Junior/Club team (League) |
|---|---|---|---|---|---|
| 1 | 18 | Chris Stewart (RW) | Canada | Colorado Avalanche | Kingston Frontenacs (OHL) |
| 2 | 51 | Nigel Williams (D) | United States | Colorado Avalanche | U.S. National Team Development Program (NAHL) |
| 2 | 59 | Codey Burki (C) | Canada | Colorado Avalanche (From Calgary Flames) | Brandon Wheat Kings (WHL) |
| 3 | 81 | Mike Carman (C) | United States | Colorado Avalanche | U.S. National Team Development Program (NAHL) |
| 4 | 110 | Kevin Montgomery (D) | United States | Colorado Avalanche (From Edmonton Oilers) | U.S. National Team Development Program (NAHL) |
| 7 | 201 | Billy Sauer (G) | United States | Colorado Avalanche | University of Michigan (CCHA) |

== Farm teams ==
=== Albany River Rats ===
The Avalanche signed a one-year deal to join the Carolina Hurricanes as the NHL affiliate for the Albany River Rats for the 2006–07 AHL season.

During the season, the Avs announced that they had signed a long term deal to be the NHL affiliate of the new Cleveland expansion team beginning in 2007–08. Coincidentally, the new franchise is a reincarnation of the Utah Grizzlies franchise, which played in Denver as the Denver Grizzlies until 1995, when the Avs came to Denver.

=== Arizona Sundogs ===
The Arizona Sundogs began their inaugural season in the Central Hockey League.

== See also ==
- 2006–07 NHL season
