= 2006–07 San Jose Sharks season =

National Hockey League team season

2006–07 San Jose Sharks
- Division: 2nd Pacific
- Conference: 5th Western
- 2006–07 record: 51–26–5
- Home record: 25–12–4
- Road record: 26–14–1
- Goals for: 258
- Goals against: 199

Team information
- General manager: Doug Wilson
- Coach: Ron Wilson
- Captain: Patrick Marleau
- Alternate captains: Scott Hannan; Joe Thornton
- Arena: HP Pavilion at San Jose
- Average attendance: 17,496
- Minor league affiliates: Worcester Sharks; Fresno Falcons; Toledo Storm

Team leaders
- Goals: Jonathan Cheechoo (37)
- Assists: Joe Thornton (92)
- Points: Joe Thornton (114)
- Penalty minutes: Mark Bell (83)
- Plus/minus: Joe Thornton (+24)
- Wins: Vesa Toskala (26)
- Goals against average: Evgeni Nabokov (2.29)

The 2006–07 season San Jose Sharks was the 16th season played by the franchise.

== Offseason ==
During the 2006 offseason, the San Jose Sharks made significant changes in order to bolster their defense and team grit. The Sharks signed Mike Grier from the Buffalo Sabres and former Shark Curtis Brown from the Chicago Blackhawks, two forwards noted for their defense prowess on both sides of the ice. After signing the two veterans, General Manager Doug Wilson traded their top offensive defenceman in 2005–06, Tom Preissing, to the Ottawa Senators in exchange for centre Mark Bell of the Chicago Blackhawks in a three-way trade involving Martin Havlat going from Ottawa to the Blackhawks. Wilson then traded underachieving winger Nils Ekman to the Pittsburgh Penguins. In August, to round off their flurry of trades, the Sharks signed veterans Mathieu Biron and Patrick Traverse. The Sharks also signed Graham Mink and Scott Ferguson to their American Hockey League (AHL) affiliate, the Worcester Sharks. On October 2, 2006, the Sharks acquired Vladimir Malakhov and a first-round conditional draft pick in exchange for Jim Fahey and Alexander Korolyuk, who was playing in Russia at the time.

== Regular season ==
The Sharks got off to a sizzling 20–7–0 start, the best in franchise history. Shortly after, however, several key players missed time due to injuries, and the Sharks continued to struggle with consistency as their results dropped off. At the end of February, they lost four games in a row, their longest losing streak of the season.

When the trading deadline approached, Wilson used some of his carefully acquired assets to address the team's areas of need, trading draft picks and prospects for Craig Rivet from the Montreal Canadiens and Bill Guerin from the St. Louis Blues. With Rivet playing quality minutes on defense and Guerin scoring goals on offense, the Sharks began winning at a torrid pace, finishing the last 16 games of the regular season with a record of 13–1–3. They concluded the regular season with a total record of 51–26–5 for 107 points, the most wins and points in franchise history. However, in a competitive Western Conference, their record was only good enough for the fifth playoff seed, and they had to open the playoffs on the road.

The Sharks spent the majority of the season rotating their two goaltenders, Vesa Toskala and Evgeni Nabokov, every other game. The only time either one played for an extended period of time was when the other was injured or otherwise unable to play. When Toskala injured his groin, Nabokov made 14-straight starts and played arguably the best hockey of his career, significantly contributing to the Sharks' late-season spate of victories. As a result, despite Toskala's return from injury, Head Coach Ron Wilson retained Nabokov as the number one goaltender to finish the regular season and enter into the playoffs.

The Sharks iced four rookies during the season: Marc-Edouard Vlasic, Matt Carle, Ryane Clowe and Joe Pavelski, with each making significant contributions to the team's success. Vlasic, at just 19-years-of-age, was not expected to make the team, but put together an impressive pre-season performance and was on the Sharks' opening night roster. He went on to play 81 games, leading all NHL rookie defensemen in average ice time at over 21 minutes per game, and was arguably the Sharks' most consistent defenceman the whole season.

=== Season standings ===
Pacific Division
No.	CR		GP	W	L	OTL	GF	GA	Pts
1	2	**Anaheim Ducks**	82	48	20	14	258	208	110
2	5	**San Jose Sharks**	82	51	26	5	258	199	107
3	6	**Dallas Stars**	82	50	25	7	226	197	107
4	14	Los Angeles Kings	82	27	41	14	227	283	68
5	15	Phoenix Coyotes	82	31	46	5	216	284	67

Note: CR = Conference rank; GP = Games played; W = Wins; L = Losses; T = Ties; OTL = Overtime/shootout loss; GF = Goals for; GA = Goals against; PIM = Penalties in minutes; Pts = Points
Bolded teams qualified for the playoffs.

Western Conference
R		Div	GP	W	L	OTL	GF	GA	Pts
**1**	**z-Detroit Red Wings**	**CE**	**82**	**50**	**19**	**13**	**254**	**199**	**113**
**2**	**y-Anaheim Ducks**	**PA**	**82**	**48**	**20**	**14**	**258**	**208**	**110**
**3**	**y-Vancouver Canucks**	**NW**	**82**	**49**	**26**	**7**	**222**	**201**	**105**
**4**	**Nashville Predators**	**CE**	**82**	**51**	**23**	**8**	**272**	**212**	**110**
**5**	**San Jose Sharks**	**PA**	**82**	**51**	**26**	**5**	**258**	**199**	**107**
**6**	**Dallas Stars**	**PA**	**82**	**50**	**25**	**7**	**226**	**197**	**107**
**7**	**Minnesota Wild**	**NW**	**82**	**48**	**26**	**8**	**235**	**191**	**104**
**8**	**Calgary Flames**	**NW**	**82**	**43**	**29**	**10**	**258**	**226**	**96**
8.5
9	Colorado Avalanche	NW	82	44	31	7	272	251	95
10	St. Louis Blues	CE	82	34	35	13	214	254	81
11	Columbus Blue Jackets	CE	82	33	42	7	201	249	73
12	Edmonton Oilers	NW	82	32	43	7	195	248	71
13	Chicago Blackhawks	CE	82	31	42	9	201	258	71
14	Los Angeles Kings	PA	82	27	41	14	227	283	68
15	Phoenix Coyotes	PA	82	31	46	5	216	284	67

bold - qualified for playoffs, y - division title, z - best conference record
CE - Central Division, NW - Northwest Division, PA - Pacific Division

== Playoffs ==
The San Jose Sharks ended the 2006–07 regular season as the Western Conference's fifth seed.

In the first round of the playoffs, the Sharks met the Nashville Predators, and advanced to the second round after defeating them 4 games to 1 for the second-straight season. They then fell to the Detroit Red Wings in the semifinals in six games.

== Schedule and results ==
=== Regular season ===
2006–07 regular season
October: 9–4–0 (home: 4–1–0; road: 5–3–0)

Game	Date	Visitor	Score	Home	OT	Decision	Attendance	Record	Points	Recap
1	October 5	St. Louis	4 – 5	San Jose	OT	Toskala	17,496	1–0–0	2	W
2	October 7	NY Islanders	0 – 2	San Jose		Nabokov	17,496	2–0–0	4	W
3	October 9	San Jose	4 – 1	Calgary		Toskala	19,289	3–0–0	6	W
4	October 12	San Jose	4 – 6	Edmonton		Nabokov	16,839	3–1–0	6	L
5	October 13	San Jose	6 – 4	Vancouver		Toskala	18,630	4–1–0	8	W
6	October 17	Dallas	0 – 2	San Jose		Nabokov	16,380	5–1–0	10	W
7	October 19	Detroit	1 – 5	San Jose		Toskala	17,496	6–1–0	12	W
8	October 21	Minnesota	4 – 1	San Jose		Nabokov	17,496	6–2–0	12	L
9	October 23	San Jose	3 – 0	Columbus		Toskala	16,067	7–2–0	14	W
10	October 25	San Jose	1 – 2	Detroit		Nabokov	20,066	7–3–0	14	L
11	October 26	San Jose	3 – 4	Nashville		Toskala	13,436	7–4–0	14	L
12	October 29	San Jose	4 – 2	Tampa Bay		Nabokov	19,904	8–4–0	16	W
13	October 31	San Jose	2 – 1	Florida		Toskala	10,081	9–4–0	18	W

November: 10–3–0 (home: 5–1–0; road: 5–2–0)

Game	Date	Visitor	Score	Home	OT	Decision	Attendance	Record	Points	Recap
14	November 2	NY Rangers	3 – 1	San Jose		Nabokov	17,091	9–5–0	18	L
15	November 4	Pittsburgh	2 – 3	San Jose		Toskala	17,496	10–5–0	20	W
16	November 7	Minnesota	1 – 3	San Jose		Nabokov	17,233	11–5–0	22	W
17	November 9	San Jose	7 – 3	Los Angeles		Toskala	16,618	12–5–0	24	W
18	November 11	San Jose	2 – 1	Phoenix		Toskala	15,036	13–5–0	26	W
19	November 13	San Jose	2 – 4	Los Angeles		Toskala	16,667	13–6–0	26	L
20	November 15	San Jose	4 – 3	Colorado		Nabokov	18,007	14–6–0	28	W
21	November 18	Philadelphia	1 – 6	San Jose		Toskala	17,496	15–6–0	30	W
22	November 21	San Jose	0 – 5	Anaheim		Nabokov	15,013	15–7–0	30	L
23	November 22	Los Angeles	3 – 6	San Jose		Toskala	17,496	16–7–0	32	W
24	November 25	New Jersey	0 – 2	San Jose		Nabokov	17,496	17–7–0	34	W
25	November 28	San Jose	2 – 0	St. Louis		Toskala	8,679	18–7–0	36	W
26	November 29	San Jose	2 – 1	Minnesota		Nabokov	18,568	19–7–0	38	W

December: 7–7–0 (home: 4–5–0; road: 3–2–0)

Game	Date	Visitor	Score	Home	OT	Decision	Attendance	Record	Points	Recap
27	December 2	San Jose	3 – 2	Detroit		Toskala	20,066	20–7–0	40	W
28	December 4	San Jose	0 – 1	Dallas		Nabokov	17,056	20–8–0	40	L
29	December 7	Colorado	5 – 2	San Jose		Toskala	17,039	20–9–0	40	L
30	December 9	Nashville	1 – 3	San Jose		Nabokov	17,496	21–9–0	42	W
31	December 11	Phoenix	0 – 4	San Jose		Toskala	16,717	22–9–0	44	W
32	December 12	San Jose	3 – 1	Los Angeles		Nabokov	15,204	23–9–0	46	W
33	December 14	Los Angeles	4 – 2	San Jose		Toskala	17,496	23–10–0	46	L
34	December 16	Anaheim	3 – 4	San Jose		Nabokov	17,496	24–10–0	48	W
35	December 21	Dallas	3 – 0	San Jose		Toskala	17,496	24–11–0	48	L
36	December 23	Calgary	1 – 4	San Jose		Nabokov	17,496	25–11–0	50	W
37	December 26	Anaheim	4 – 3	San Jose		Nabokov	17,496	25–12–0	50	L
38	December 28	Phoenix	3 – 2	San Jose		Toskala	17,496	25–13–0	50	L
39	December 30	San Jose	0 – 8	Phoenix		Nabokov	17,643	25–14–0	50	L
40	December 31	San Jose	4 – 2	Dallas		Toskala	18,584	26–14–0	52	W

January: 7–3–1 (home: 4–2–1; road: 3–1–0)

Game	Date	Visitor	Score	Home	OT	Decision	Attendance	Record	Points	Recap
41	January 4	Detroit	4 – 9	San Jose		Toskala	17,496	27–14–0	54	W
42	January 6	Columbus	2 – 5	San Jose		Toskala	17,496	28–14–0	56	W
43	January 10	Edmonton	3 – 2	San Jose		Nabokov	17,496	28–15–0	56	L
44	January 11	San Jose	5 – 2	Los Angeles		Toskala	17,054	29–15–0	58	W
45	January 13	San Jose	4 – 1	Phoenix		Toskala	16,642	30–15–0	60	W
46	January 15	Colorado	1 – 3	San Jose		Nabokov	17,496	31–15–0	62	W
47	January 18	Phoenix	2 – 5	San Jose		Toskala	17,496	32–15–0	64	W
48	January 20	St. Louis	1 – 0	San Jose		Nabokov	17,496	32–16–0	64	L
49	January 26	San Jose	5 – 1	Edmonton		Toskala	16,839	33–16–0	66	W
50	January 28	San Jose	1 – 3	Vancouver		Nabokov	18,630	33–17–0	66	L
51	January 30	Dallas	3 – 2	San Jose	SO	Toskala	17,496	33–17–1	67	OTL

February: 5–7–1 (home: 1–3–1; road: 4–4–0)

Game	Date	Visitor	Score	Home	OT	Decision	Attendance	Record	Points	Recap
52	February 1	Dallas	4 – 2	San Jose		Toskala	17,496	33–18–1	67	L
53	February 3	Chicago	2 – 4	San Jose		Toskala	17,496	34–18–1	69	W
54	February 6	Anaheim	7 – 4	San Jose		Toskala	17,496	34–19–1	69	L
55	February 7	San Jose	3 – 2	Anaheim		Toskala	17,466	35–19–1	71	W
56	February 13	San Jose	6 – 5	St. Louis		Toskala	9,235	36–19–1	73	W
57	February 14	San Jose	0 – 5	Nashville		Toskala	13,836	36–20–1	73	L
58	February 16	San Jose	0 – 3	Columbus		Nabokov	16,045	36–21–1	73	L
59	February 18	San Jose	2 – 5	Dallas		Nabokov	17,849	36–22–1	73	L
60	February 21	San Jose	3 – 2	Washington	SO	Nabokov	13,622	37–22–1	75	W
61	February 22	San Jose	2 – 0	Chicago		Nabokov	10,125	38–22–1	77	W
62	February 24	San Jose	4 – 7	Calgary		Nabokov	19,289	38–23–1	77	L
63	February 26	Anaheim	3 – 2	San Jose		Nabokov	17,496	38–24–1	77	L
64	February 28	Nashville	4 – 3	San Jose	SO	Nabokov	17,496	38–24–2	78	OTL

March: 10–2–2 (home: 5–0–1; road: 5–2–1)

Game	Date	Visitor	Score	Home	OT	Decision	Attendance	Record	Points	Recap
65	March 2	San Jose	1 – 3	Anaheim		Nabokov	17,174	38–25–2	78	L
66	March 4	San Jose	4 – 0	Dallas		Nabokov	18,002	39–25–2	80	W
67	March 6	San Jose	3 – 0	Minnesota		Nabokov	18,568	40–25–2	82	W
68	March 9	Vancouver	2 – 1	San Jose	OT	Nabokov	17,496	40–25–3	83	OTL
69	March 11	Edmonton	0 – 3	San Jose		Nabokov	17,496	41–25–3	85	W
70	March 13	Chicago	1 – 7	San Jose		Nabokov	17,496	42–25–3	87	W
71	March 15	San Jose	5 – 1	Phoenix		Nabokov	17,744	43–25–3	89	W
72	March 16	Columbus	0 – 3	San Jose		Toskala	17,496	44–25–3	91	W
73	March 18	San Jose	3 – 4	Colorado	OT	Nabokov	18,007	44–25–4	92	OTL
74	March 21	San Jose	4 – 1	Chicago		Nabokov	10,374	45–25–4	94	W
75	March 22	San Jose	5 – 1	Atlanta		Toskala	16,367	46–25–4	96	W
76	March 24	San Jose	4 – 6	Carolina		Toskala	18,763	46–26–4	96	L
77	March 27	Los Angeles	1 – 3	San Jose		Nabokov	17,496	47–26–4	98	W
78	March 30	Phoenix	2 – 4	San Jose		Nabokov	17,496	48–26–4	100	W

April: 3–0–1 (home: 2–0–1; road: 1–0–0)

Game	Date	Visitor	Score	Home	OT	Decision	Attendance	Record	Points	Recap
79	April 1	Los Angeles	2 – 6	San Jose		Nabokov	17,496	49–26–4	102	W
80	April 4	San Jose	3 – 2	Anaheim	SO	Nabokov	17,440	50–26–4	104	W
81	April 5	Calgary	3 – 4	San Jose		Nabokov	17,496	51–26–4	106	W
82	April 7	Vancouver	4 – 3	San Jose	OT	Nabokov	17,496	51–26–5	107	OTL

Legend: W Win (2 points) L Loss (0 points) OTL Overtime/shootout loss (1 point)

=== Playoffs ===
2007 Stanley Cup playoffs
Western Conference Quarterfinals vs. (4) Nashville Predators – Sharks win 4–1

Game	Date	Visitor	Score	Home	OT	Decision	Attendance	Series	Recap
1	April 11	San Jose	5 – 4	Nashville	2OT	Nabokov	17,113	1 – 0	W
2	April 13	San Jose	2 – 5	Nashville		Nabokov	17,113	1 – 1	L
3	April 16	Nashville	1 – 3	San Jose		Nabokov	17,496	2 – 1	W
4	April 18	Nashville	2 – 3	San Jose		Nabokov	17,496	3 – 1	W
5	April 20	San Jose	3 – 2	Nashville		Nabokov	17,113	4 – 1	W

Western Conference Semifinals vs. (1) Detroit Red Wings – Red Wings win 4–2

Game	Date	Visitor	Score	Home	OT	Decision	Attendance	Series	Recap
1	April 26	San Jose	2 – 0	Detroit		Nabokov	18,712	1 – 0	W
2	April 28	San Jose	2 – 3	Detroit		Nabokov	19,113	1 – 1	L
3	April 30	Detroit	1 – 2	San Jose		Nabokov	17,496	2 – 1	W
4	May 2	Detroit	3 – 2	San Jose	OT	Nabokov	17,496	2 – 2	L
5	May 5	San Jose	1 – 4	Detroit		Nabokov	19,937	2 – 3	L
6	May 7	Detroit	2 – 0	San Jose		Nabokov	17,496	2 – 4	L

Legend: W Win L Loss

== Player statistics ==
=== Scoring ===
- Position abbreviations: C = Center; D = Defense; G = Goaltender; LW = Left wing; RW = Right wing
- † = Joined team via a transaction (e.g., trade, waivers, signing) during the season. Stats reflect time with the Sharks only.
- ‡ = Left team via a transaction (e.g., trade, waivers, release) during the season. Stats reflect time with the Sharks only.

No.	Player	Pos	Regular season						Playoffs					
No.	Player	Pos	GP	G	A	Pts	+/-	PIM	GP	G	A	Pts	+/-	PIM
19	Joe Thornton	C	82	22	92	114	24	44	11	1	10	11	2	10
12	Patrick Marleau	C	77	32	46	78	9	33	11	3	3	6	−5	2
14	Jonathan Cheechoo	RW	76	37	32	69	11	69	11	3	3	6	1	6
9	Milan Michalek	RW	78	26	40	66	17	36	11	4	2	6	3	4
18	Matt Carle	D	77	11	31	42	9	30	11	2	3	5	3	0
29	Ryane Clowe	RW	58	16	18	34	4	78	11	4	2	6	−2	17
25	Mike Grier	RW	81	16	17	33	−5	43	11	2	2	4	1	27
10	Christian Ehrhoff	D	82	10	23	33	8	63	11	0	2	2	1	6
26	Steve Bernier	RW	62	15	16	31	5	29	11	0	1	1	2	2
8 (Note: Pavelski wore number 53 through December 23.)	Joe Pavelski	C	46	14	14	28	4	18	6	1	0	1	2	0
44	Marc-Edouard Vlasic	D	81	3	23	26	13	18	11	0	1	1	5	2
22	Scott Hannan	D	79	4	20	24	1	38	11	0	2	2	4	33
34	Patrick Rissmiller	LW	79	7	15	22	1	22	11	1	3	4	1	0
7	Mark Bell	C	71	11	10	21	−9	83	4	0	0	0	−2	2
37	Curtis Brown	C	78	8	12	20	−2	56	11	0	2	2	1	2
4	Kyle McLaren	D	67	5	12	17	10	61	11	0	4	4	−2	10
11	Marcel Goc	C	78	5	8	13	−2	24	11	2	1	3	3	4
16	Mark Smith	C	41	3	10	13	−4	42	3	0	0	0	0	4
13	Bill Guerin†	RW	16	8	1	9	2	14	9	0	2	2	−3	12
52	Craig Rivet†	D	17	1	7	8	8	12	11	2	3	5	−5	18
6	Josh Gorges‡	D	47	1	3	4	−3	26	—	—	—	—	—	—
3	Douglas Murray	D	35	0	3	3	0	31	—	—	—	—	—	—
35	Vesa Toskala	G	38	0	3	3		0	—	—	—	—	—	—
15	Ville Nieminen‡	LW	30	1	1	2	−7	14	—	—	—	—	—	—
5	Rob Davison	D	22	0	2	2	−2	27	—	—	—	—	—	—
49	Mathieu Darche	LW	2	0	0	0	0	0	—	—	—	—	—	—
20	Evgeni Nabokov	G	50	0	0	0		6	11	0	0	0		0
27	Scott Parker‡	RW	11	0	0	0	0	22	—	—	—	—	—	—
39	Tomas Plihal	C	3	0	0	0	0	0	—	—	—	—	—	—

=== Goaltending ===
No.	Player	Regular season										Playoffs								
No.	Player	GP	W	L	OT	SA	GA	GAA	SV%	SO	TOI	GP	W	L	SA	GA	GAA	SV%	SO	TOI
35	Vesa Toskala	38	26	10	1	915	84	2.35	.908	4	2142	–	–	–	–	–	–	–	–	–
20	Evgeni Nabokov	50	25	16	4	1227	106	2.29	.914	7	2778	11	6	5	323	26	2.23	.920	1	701

== Awards and records ==
=== Awards ===
Type	Award/honor	Recipient	Ref
League (annual)	NHL All-Rookie Team	Matt Carle (Defense)	
League (annual)	NHL All-Rookie Team	Marc-Edouard Vlasic (Defense)	
League (in-season)	NHL All-Star Game selection	Jonathan Cheechoo (Note: Cheechoo and Thornton were voted to the starting lineup.)	
League (in-season)	NHL All-Star Game selection	Patrick Marleau	
League (in-season)	NHL All-Star Game selection	Joe Thornton	
League (in-season)	NHL First Star of the Week	Joe Thornton (March 18)	
League (in-season)	NHL Rookie of the Month	Ryane Clowe (January)	
League (in-season)	NHL Second Star of the Month	Joe Thornton (March)	
League (in-season)	NHL Second Star of the Week	Jonathan Cheechoo (March 25)	
League (in-season)	NHL Third Star of the Week	Joe Thornton (January 7)	
League (in-season)	NHL Third Star of the Week	Evgeni Nabokov (March 11)	
League (in-season)	NHL YoungStars Game selection	Matt Carle	
Team	Sharks Player of the Year	Joe Thornton	
Team	Sharks Rookie of the Year	Marc-Edouard Vlasic	
Team	Three Stars of the Year	Joe Thornton	

=== Milestones ===
Milestone	Player	Date	Ref
First game	Marc-Edouard Vlasic	October 5, 2006	
First game	Joe Pavelski	November 22, 2006	
First game	Tomas Plihal	January 26, 2007	

== Transactions ==
The Sharks were involved in the following transactions from June 20, 2006, the day after the deciding game of the 2006 Stanley Cup Finals, through June 6, 2007, the day of the deciding game of the 2007 Stanley Cup Finals.

=== Trades ===
Date	Details		Ref
June 24, 2006	To San Jose Sharks: 1st-round pick in 2006	To Montreal Canadiens: 1st-round pick in 2006; 2nd-round pick in 2006	
June 24, 2006	To San Jose Sharks: 2nd-round pick in 2006	To Columbus Blue Jackets: Philadelphia's 3rd-round pick in 2006; 4th-round pick in 2006; 2nd-round pick in 2007	
June 24, 2006	To San Jose Sharks: Edmonton's 4th-round pick in 2006	To New York Islanders: Tampa Bay's 4th-round pick in 2006; 6th-round pick in 2006	
July 10, 2006	To San Jose Sharks: Mark Bell	To Chicago Blackhawks: Josh Hennessy; Tom Preissing	
July 20, 2006	To San Jose Sharks: Carolina's 2nd-round pick in 2007	To Pittsburgh Penguins: Nils Ekman; Patrick Ehelechner	
October 1, 2006	To San Jose Sharks: Vladimir Malakhov; Conditional 1st-round pick in 2007	To New Jersey Devils: Jim Fahey; Alexander Korolyuk	
December 15, 2006	To San Jose Sharks: Patrick Traverse	To Montreal Canadiens: Mathieu Biron	
February 16, 2007 (Note: This trade was voided on February 23 since Korolyuk did not report to San Jose and remained in Russia.)	To San Jose Sharks: Alexander Korolyuk	To New Jersey Devils: Conditional 3rd-round pick in 2007	
February 25, 2007	To San Jose Sharks: Craig Rivet; 5th-round pick in 2008	To Montreal Canadiens: Josh Gorges; 1st-round pick in 2007	
February 27, 2007	To San Jose Sharks: Bill Guerin	To St. Louis Blues: Ville Nieminen; Rights to Jay Barriball; New Jersey's 1st-round pick in 2007	
February 27, 2007	To San Jose Sharks: 6th-round pick in 2008	To Colorado Avalanche: Scott Parker	
February 27, 2007	To San Jose Sharks: 7th-round pick in 2007	To Pittsburgh Penguins: Nolan Schaefer	

=== Players acquired ===
Date	Player	Former team	Term	Via	Ref
July 3, 2006	Curtis Brown	Chicago Blackhawks	multi-year	Free agency	
July 3, 2006	Mike Grier	Buffalo Sabres	3-year	Free agency	
July 10, 2006	Mathieu Darche	Colorado Avalanche		Free agency	
July 10, 2006	Patrick Traverse	Dallas Stars		Free agency	
July 14, 2006	Scott Ferguson	Minnesota Wild		Free agency	
July 14, 2006	Graham Mink	Washington Capitals		Free agency	
August 9, 2006	Mathieu Biron	Washington Capitals	1-year	Free agency	
March 8, 2007	T. J. Fox	Union College (ECAC)	2-year	Free agency	

=== Players lost ===
Date	Player	New team	Via (Note: In parentheses is the player's free agency group on July 1 if applicable.)	Ref
July 1, 2006	Scott Thornton	Los Angeles Kings	Free agency (III)	
July 2, 2006	Alyn McCauley	Los Angeles Kings	Free agency (III)	
July 21, 2006	Tim Conboy	Carolina Hurricanes	Free agency (UFA)	
July 23, 2006	Matt Carkner	Pittsburgh Penguins	Free agency (VI)	
August 14, 2006	Shane Joseph	Augsburger Panther (DEL)	Free agency (UFA)	
September 28, 2006	Patrick Traverse	Montreal Canadiens	Waivers	
October 12, 2006	Josh Prudden	Fresno Falcons (ECHL)	Free agency (UFA)	

=== Signings ===
Date	Player	Term	Contract type	Ref
July 14, 2006	Taylor Dakers		Entry-level	
July 14, 2006	Rob Davison	1-year	Re-signing	
July 14, 2006	Scott Parker		Re-signing	
July 14, 2006	Dimitri Patzold	1-year	Re-signing	
July 14, 2006	Joe Pavelski		Entry-level	
July 15, 2006	Jim Fahey	1-year	Re-signing	
July 15, 2006	Marcel Goc	2-year	Re-signing	
July 15, 2006	Douglas Murray	3-year	Re-signing	
July 15, 2006	Tomas Plihal	1-year	Re-signing	
July 15, 2006	Garrett Stafford	1-year	Re-signing	
July 15, 2006	Grant Stevenson	1-year	Re-signing	
July 15, 2006	Craig Valette	1-year	Re-signing	
July 24, 2006	Mark Smith	1-year	Re-signing	
July 25, 2006	Mark Bell	3-year	Re-signing	
July 25, 2006	Christian Ehrhoff	2-year	Re-signing	
August 9, 2006	Patrick Rissmiller	2-year	Re-signing	
September 21, 2006	Ashton Rome	3-year	Entry-level	
October 5, 2006	Nolan Schaefer	1-year	Re-signing	
December 28, 2006	Derek Joslin		Entry-level	
March 19, 2006	Torrey Mitchell		Entry-level	
March 30, 2006	Ty Wishart		Entry-level	
April 23, 2006	Jamie McGinn		Entry-level	
April 23, 2006	Mike Morris		Entry-level	

== Draft picks ==
San Jose's draft picks at the 2006 NHL entry draft held at General Motors Place in Vancouver, British Columbia.

Round	#	Player	Nationality	College/Junior/Club team (League)
1	16	Ty Wishart	Canada	Prince George Cougars (WHL)
2	36	Jamie McGinn	Canada	Ottawa 67's (OHL)
4	98	James DeLory	Canada	Oshawa Generals (OHL)
5	143	Ashton Rome	Canada	Kamloops Blazers (WHL)
7	202	John McCarthy	United States	Boston University (Hockey East)
7	203	Jay Barriball	United States	Sioux Falls Stampede (USHL)

== See also ==
- 2006–07 NHL season
