= List of San Jose Sharks award winners =

San Jose Sharks awards

Team trophies
- Award*: Wins
- Stanley Cup: 0
- Clarence S. Campbell Bowl: 1
- Presidents' Trophy: 1

Individual awards
- Award*: Wins
- Art Ross Trophy: 1
- Bill Masterton Memorial Trophy: 1
- Calder Memorial Trophy: 1
- Hart Memorial Trophy: 1
- James Norris Memorial Trophy: 2
- Lester Patrick Trophy: 1
- Maurice "Rocket" Richard Trophy: 1
- NHL Foundation Player Award: 1

Total
- Awards won: 11

This is a list of San Jose Sharks award winners.

== League awards ==
=== Team trophies ===
Team trophies awarded to the San Jose Sharks
Award	Description	Times won	Seasons	References
Clarence S. Campbell Bowl	Western Conference playoff championship	1	2015–16	
Presidents' Trophy	Most regular season points	1	2008–09	

=== Individual awards ===
Individual awards won by San Jose Sharks players and staff
Award	Description	Winner	Season	References
Art Ross Trophy	Regular season scoring champion	Joe Thornton	2005–06	
Bill Masterton Memorial Trophy	Perseverance, sportsmanship and dedication to hockey	Tony Granato	1996–97	
Calder Memorial Trophy	Rookie of the year	Evgeni Nabokov	2000–01	
Hart Memorial Trophy	Most valuable player to his team during the regular season	Joe Thornton	2005–06	
James Norris Memorial Trophy	Best defenseman	Brent Burns	2016–17	
James Norris Memorial Trophy	Best defenseman	Erik Karlsson	2022–23	
Maurice "Rocket" Richard Trophy	Most goals in the regular season	Jonathan Cheechoo	2005–06	
NHL Foundation Player Award	Community service	Brent Burns	2014–15	

== All-Stars ==
=== NHL first and second team All-Stars ===
The NHL first and second team All-Stars are the top players at each position as voted on by the Professional Hockey Writers' Association.

San Jose Sharks selected to the NHL First and Second Team All-Stars
Player	Position	Selections	Season	Team
Dan Boyle	Defense	1	2008–09	2nd
Brent Burns	Defense	3	2015–16	2nd
Brent Burns	Defense	3	2016–17	1st
Brent Burns	Defense	3	2018–19	1st
Brian Campbell	Defense	1	2007–08	2nd
Erik Karlsson	Defense	1	2022–23	1st
Evgeni Nabokov	Goaltender	1	2007–08	1st
Joe Pavelski	Left wing	1	2013–14	2nd
Joe Thornton	Center	3	2005–06	1st
Joe Thornton	Center	3	2007–08	2nd
Joe Thornton	Center	3	2015–16	2nd

=== NHL All-Rookie Team ===
The NHL All-Rookie Team consists of the top rookies at each position as voted on by the Professional Hockey Writers' Association.

San Jose Sharks selected to the NHL All-Rookie Team
Player	Position	Season
Matt Carle	Defense	2006–07
Macklin Celebrini	Forward	2024–25
Logan Couture	Forward	2010–11
Jeff Friesen	Forward	1994–95
Evgeni Nabokov	Goaltender	2000–01
Brad Stuart	Defense	1999–2000
Marc-Edouard Vlasic	Defense	2006–07

=== All-Star Game selections ===
The National Hockey League All-Star Game is a mid-season exhibition game held annually between many of the top players of each season. Twenty-two All-Star Games have been held since the San Jose Sharks entered the league in 1991, with at least one player chosen to represent the Sharks in each year except 1998. The All-Star game has not been held in various years: 1979 and 1987 due to the 1979 Challenge Cup and Rendez-vous '87 series between the NHL and the Soviet national team, respectively, 1995, 2005, and 2013 as a result of labor stoppages, 2006, 2010, 2014 and 2026 because of the Winter Olympic Games, 2021 as a result of the COVID-19 pandemic, and 2025 when it was replaced by the 2025 4 Nations Face-Off. San Jose has hosted two of the games. The 47th and 64th took place at the SAP Center at San Jose.

- † Selected by fan vote
- ‡ Selected by Commissioner

San Jose Sharks players and coaches selected to the All-Star Game
Game	Year	Name	Position	References
43rd	1992	Doug Wilson	Defense	
44th	1993	Pat Falloon (Did not play)	Right wing	
44th	1993	Kelly Kisio	Center	
45th	1994	Arturs Irbe	Goaltender	
45th	1994	Sandis Ozolinsh	Defense	
46th	1996	Owen Nolan	Right wing	
47th	1997	Tony Granato‡	Left wing	
47th	1997	Owen Nolan	Right wing	
48th	1998	No Sharks selected	—	
49th	1999	Marco Sturm	Center	
50th	2000	Owen Nolan	Right wing	
51st	2001	Vincent Damphousse (Did not play)	Center	
51st	2001	Evgeni Nabokov	Goaltender	
51st	2001	Marcus Ragnarsson	Defense	
52nd	2002	Vincent Damphousse†	Center	
52nd	2002	Owen Nolan†	Right wing	
52nd	2002	Teemu Selanne†	Right wing	
53rd	2003	Teemu Selanne†	Right wing	
54th	2004	Patrick Marleau	Center	
55th	2007	Jonathan Cheechoo†	Right wing	
55th	2007	Patrick Marleau	Center	
55th	2007	Joe Thornton†	Center	
56th	2008	Evgeni Nabokov	Goaltender	
56th	2008	Joe Thornton	Center	
57th	2009	Dan Boyle	Defense	
57th	2009	Patrick Marleau	Center	
57th	2009	Todd McLellan	Coach	
57th	2009	Joe Thornton	Center	
58th	2011	Dan Boyle	Defense	
59th	2012	Logan Couture	Center	
59th	2012	Todd McLellan	Coach	
60th	2015	Brent Burns	Defense	
61st	2016	Brent Burns	Defense	
61st	2016	Joe Pavelski	Center	
62nd	2017	Brent Burns	Defense	
62nd	2017	Peter DeBoer	Coach	
62nd	2017	Martin Jones	Goaltender	
62nd	2017	Joe Pavelski	Center	
63rd	2018	Brent Burns	Defense	
64th	2019	Brent Burns	Defense	
64th	2019	Erik Karlsson	Defense	
64th	2019	Joe Pavelski	Center	
65th	2020	Logan Couture (Did not play)	Center	
65th	2020	Tomas Hertl (Replaced Couture)	Center	
66th	2022	Timo Meier	Right wing	
67th	2023	Erik Karlsson	Defense	
68th	2024	Tomas Hertl	Center	

== Career achievements ==
=== Hockey Hall of Fame ===
The following is a list of San Jose Sharks who have been enshrined in the Hockey Hall of Fame.

San Jose Sharks inducted into the Hockey Hall of Fame
Individual	Category	Year inducted	Years with Sharks in category	References
Rob Blake	Player	2014	2008–2010	
Ed Belfour	Player	2011	1997	
Igor Larionov	Player	2008	1993–1995	
Sergei Makarov	Player	2016	1993–1995	
Jeremy Roenick	Player	2024	2007–2009	
Teemu Selanne	Player	2017	2001–2003	
Joe Thornton	Player	2025	2005-2020	
Mike Vernon	Player	2023	1997-1999	
Doug Wilson	Player	2020	1991–1993	

=== Foster Hewitt Memorial Award ===
One member of the Sharks organization has been honored with the Foster Hewitt Memorial Award. The award is presented by the Hockey Hall of Fame to members of the radio and television industry who make outstanding contributions to their profession and the game of ice hockey during their broadcasting career.

Members of the San Jose Sharks honored with the Foster Hewitt Memorial Award
Individual	Year honored	Years with Sharks as broadcaster	References
Dan Rusanowsky	2023	1991–present	

=== Lester Patrick Trophy ===
The Lester Patrick Trophy has been presented by the National Hockey League and USA Hockey since 1966 to honor a recipient's contribution to ice hockey in the United States. This list includes all personnel who have ever been employed by the San Jose Sharks in any capacity and have also received the Lester Patrick Trophy.

Members of the San Jose Sharks honored with the Lester Patrick Trophy
Individual	Year honored	Years with Sharks	References
George Gund III	1996	1990–2002	
Brian Mullen	1995	1991–1992	

=== United States Hockey Hall of Fame ===
Members of the San Jose Sharks inducted into the United States Hockey Hall of Fame
Individual	Year inducted	Years with Sharks	References
Bill Guerin	2013	2007	
Craig Janney	2016	1995–1996	
Jeremy Roenick	2010	2007–2009	
Gary Suter	2011	1998–2002	
Ron Wilson	2017	2002–2008	

=== Retired numbers ===
The San Jose Sharks have retired two of their jersey numbers. Out of circulation is the number 99 which was retired league-wide for Wayne Gretzky on February 6, 2000. Gretzky did not play for the Sharks during his 20-year NHL career and no Sharks player had ever worn the number 99 prior to its retirement.

San Jose Sharks retired numbers
Number	Player	Position	Years with Sharks as a player	Date of retirement ceremony	References
12	Patrick Marleau	Center	1997–2017, 2019–2021	February 25, 2023	
19	Joe Thornton	Center	2005–2020	November 23, 2024	

== Team awards ==
=== Media Good Guy ===
The Media Good Guy is an annual award voted on by the Bay Area media given to the player who handles his media responsibilities with cooperation, honesty, and thoughtfulness, and answers the bell no matter the outcome or situation.

Introductory Class
Jamie Baker
Dan Boyle
Ryane Clowe
Tony Granato
Jeff Odgers

Season	Winner
2018–19	Brenden Dillon
2019–20	Logan Couture
2020–21	Logan Couture
2021–22	James Reimer
2022–23	Logan Couture
2023–24	Mario Ferraro
2024–25	Mario Ferraro
2025–26	Mario Ferraro

=== Sharks Fan Favorite Award ===
The Sharks Fan Favorite Award is an annual award voted on by Sharks fans.

Season	Winner
2010–11	Patrick Marleau
2011–12	Patrick Marleau
2012–13	Patrick Marleau

Season	Winner
2013–14	Joe Pavelski
2014–15	Joe Pavelski
2015–16	Brent Burns

Season	Winner
2016–17	Brent Burns
2017–18	Brent Burns

=== Sharks Player of the Year ===
The Sharks Player of the Year is an annual award given to the player "contributing most to the success of the Sharks" during the regular season as determined by Bay Area media.

Season	Winner
1991–92	Jeff Hackett
1992–93	Kelly Kisio
1993–94	Arturs Irbe
1994–95	Ulf Dahlen
1995–96	Jamie Baker
1996–97	Jeff Friesen
1997–98	Mike Vernon
1998–99	Steve Shields
1998–99	Mike Vernon
1999–00	Owen Nolan

Season	Winner
2000–01	Evgeni Nabokov
2001–02	Mike Ricci
2002–03	Teemu Selanne
2003–04	Patrick Marleau
2005–06	Joe Thornton
2006–07	Joe Thornton
2007–08	Evgeni Nabokov
2008–09	Patrick Marleau
2009–10	Patrick Marleau
2010–11	Antti Niemi

Season	Winner
2011–12	Logan Couture
2012–13	Antti Niemi
2013–14	Joe Pavelski
2014–15	Joe Pavelski
2015–16	Joe Thornton
2016–17	Brent Burns
2017–18	Logan Couture
2018–19	Brent Burns
2018–19	Tomas Hertl
2019–20	Timo Meier

Season	Winner
2020–21	Evander Kane
2021-22	Timo Meier
2022–23	Erik Karlsson
2023–24	Mikael Granlund
2024–25	Macklin Celebrini
2025–26	Macklin Celebrini

=== Sharks Rookie of the Year ===
The Sharks Rookie of the Year is an annual award given to the team's best rookie as determined by Bay Area media.

Season	Winner
1994–95	Jeff Friesen
1995–96	Marcus Ragnarsson
1996–97	Steve Guolla
1997–98	Patrick Marleau
1997–98	Marco Sturm
1997–98	Andrei Zyuzin
1998–99	Alexander Korolyuk
1999–00	Brad Stuart
2000–01	Evgeni Nabokov

Season	Winner
2001–02	Matt Bradley
2002–03	Jim Fahey
2003–04	Tom Preissing
2005–06	Milan Michalek
2006–07	Marc-Edouard Vlasic
2007–08	Torrey Mitchell
2008–09	Tomas Plihal
2009–10	Jason Demers
2010–11	Logan Couture

Season	Winner
2011–12	Andrew Desjardins
2012–13	Matt Irwin
2013–14	Tomas Hertl
2013–14	Matt Nieto
2014–15	Melker Karlsson
2015–16	Joonas Donskoi
2016–17	Kevin Labanc
2017–18	Joakim Ryan
2018–19	Radim Simek

Season	Winner
2019–20	Mario Ferraro
2020–21	Nikolai Knyzhov
2021–22	Jonathan Dahlen
2022–23	William Eklund
2023–24	Henry Thrun
2024–25	Macklin Celebrini
2025–26	Yaroslav Askarov

=== Three Stars of the Year ===
The Three Stars of the Year is an annual award given to the player who earns the most points from Star of the game selections throughout the regular season.

Season	Winner
2003–04	Patrick Marleau
2005–06	Jonathan Cheechoo
2006–07	Joe Thornton
2007–08	Joe Thornton
2008–09	Patrick Marleau

Season	Winner
2009–10	Evgeni Nabokov
2010–11	Antti Niemi
2011–12	Joe Pavelski
2012–13	Antti Niemi
2013–14	Joe Thornton

Season	Winner
2014–15	Logan Couture
2015–16	Joe Pavelski
2016–17	Martin Jones
2017–18	Martin Jones
2018–19	Brent Burns

Season	Winner
2019–20	Logan Couture

== See also ==
- List of National Hockey League awards
