= Colby Genoway =

Canadian ice hockey player

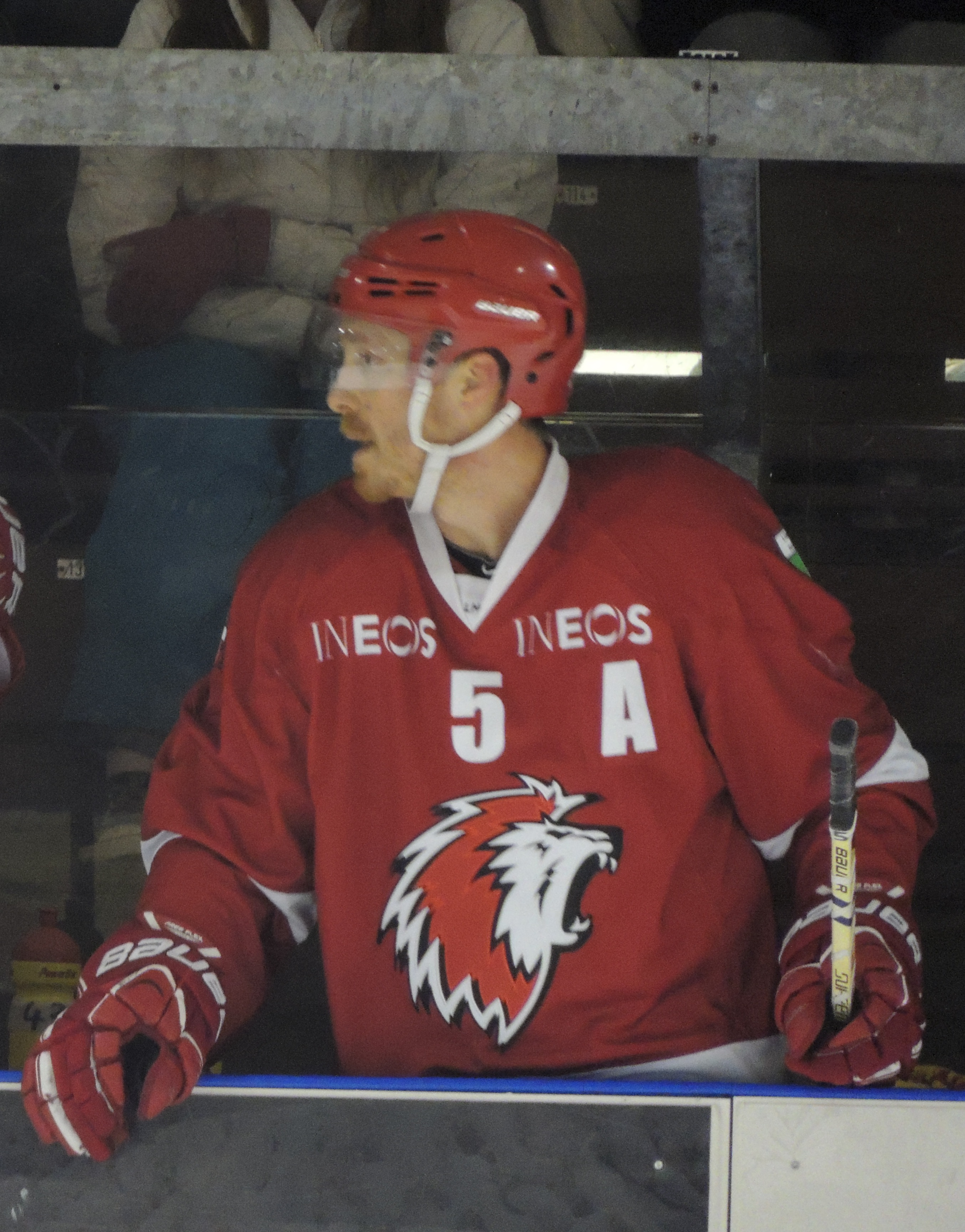
- Genoway with Lausanne HC in 2014
- Born: December 12, 1983 (age 42) Morden, Manitoba, Canada
- Height: 6 ft 1 in (185 cm)
- Weight: 198 lb (90 kg; 14 st 2 lb)
- Position: Forward
- Shoots: Right
- team Former teams: Free Agent; Hartford Wolf Pack; Portland Pirates; Manitoba Moose; Mora IK; Ilves Tampere; HC Pardubice; HC Lugano; Lausanne HC; Medveščak Zagreb; HC Fribourg-Gottéron; EHC Kloten; HC Slovan Bratislava; Kölner Haie
- NHL draft: Undrafted
- Playing career: 2005–present

Colby Genoway (born December 12, 1983) is a Canadian professional ice hockey player. He is currently an unrestricted free agent who most recently played for Kölner Haie of the German Deutsche Eishockey Liga (DEL).

== Playing career ==
On July 11, 2006, he was signed by the Anaheim Ducks of the NHL as a free agent to a two-year contract. A few months later, on January 24, 2007, he was traded to the Vancouver Canucks for Joe Rullier. However, he never got to play with either of these two teams in the NHL. He played for the Hartford Wolf Pack, the Portland Pirates and the Manitoba Moose in the AHL instead. He went on to play in Sweden, Finland and Czech Republic before making his way to Switzerland in 2010.

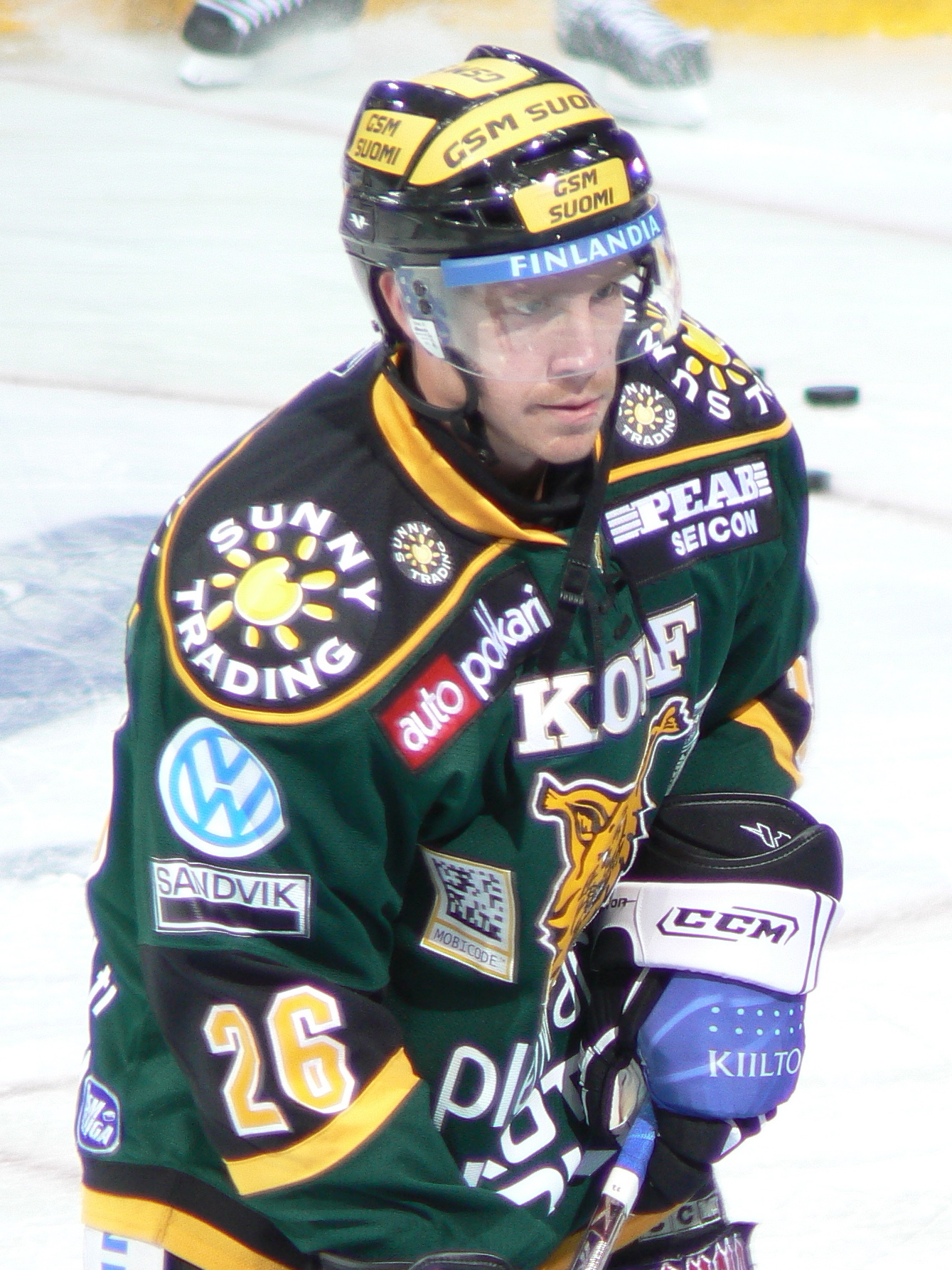
Genoway with Ilves Tampere in 2008

=== Lausanne HC ===
Genoway made his National League A debut playing with HC Lugano during the 2010–11 NLA season. At the end of that season, he signed a three-year contract with Lausanne HC as they were still playing in the second tier National League B. They went on to win the National League B title and to get promoted in April 2013, upsetting SC Langnau Tigers in the promotion-relegation game, after many unfruitful attempts including 2 promotion-relegation games lost to EHC Biel over 8 years spent playing in second division. That year, Genoway was also nominated for the Best National League B Player 2013 award at the Swiss Golden Player Award ceremony in Basle, Switzerland.

In the 2013–14 season, he tallied 26 points in 42 games and contributed to LHC clinching a playoff spot in the Swiss elite league for the first time in the club's history. They went on to push the top seed ZSC Lions to a seventh game that LHC lost 1–0 in Zurich. Genoway got two assists in that series. On March 27, 2014, Lausanne HC announced that Genoway's contract had been automatically renewed after the promotion in April 2013. On April 2, 2014, the club released a statement regarding the state of the current contracts and additions to the roster for the 2014–15 season. That statement confirmed that the promotion had actually granted Genoway a 2-year extension to his deal (and not only one as previously stated).

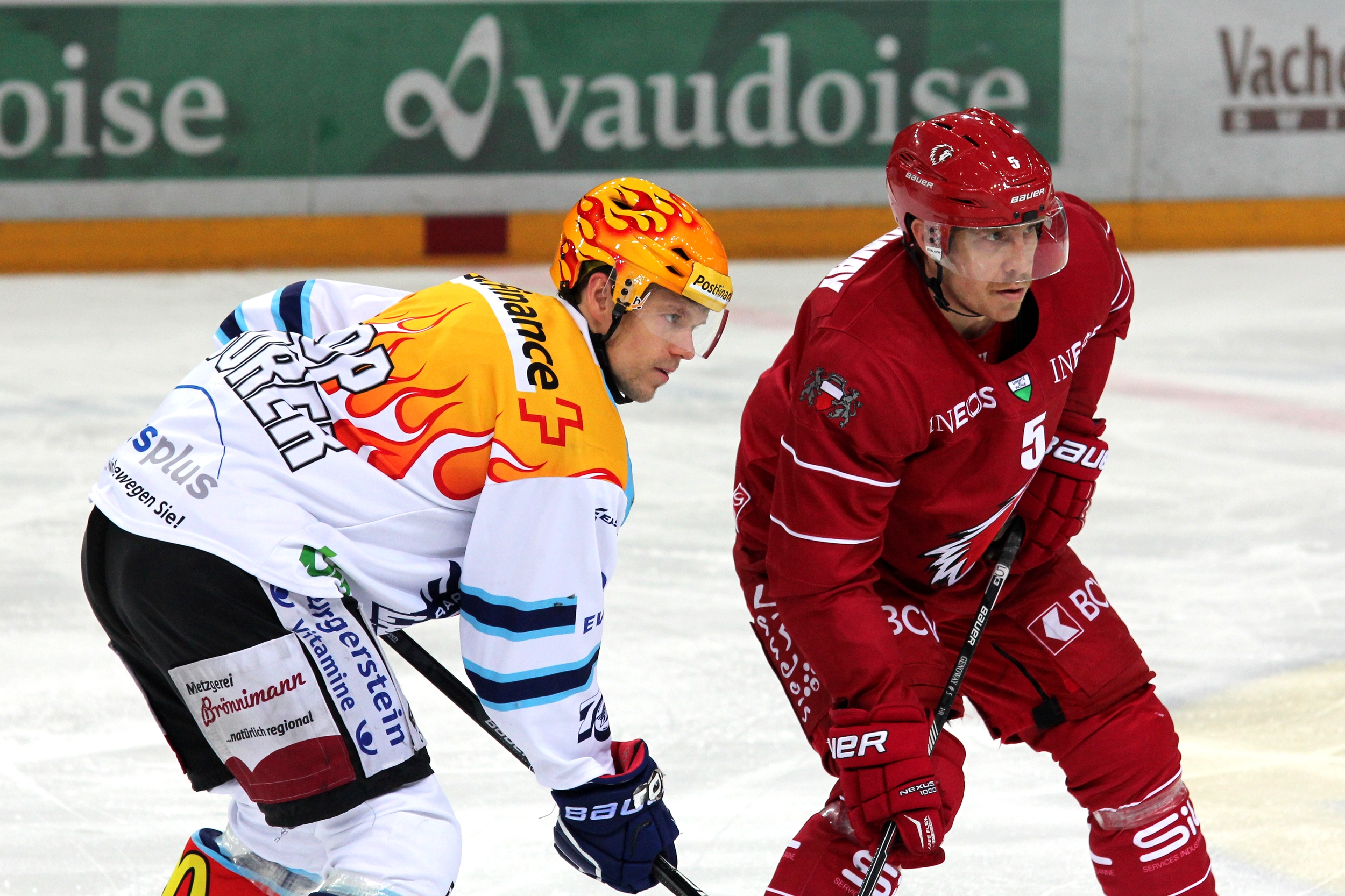
Colby Genoway (right) with Nicklas Danielsson of Rapperswil-Jona Lakers on November 11, 2014

Genoway played his first game of the 2014–15 season on November 11, 2014, after a long wrist injury that necessitated surgery. He played 6 games in a row (while Ossi Louhivaara and Juha-Pekka Hytönen were sidelined) before getting injured again. When Daniel Bång suffered a concussion, Genoway got to play a seventh game and scored his first point of the season (an assist) in the win over Biel (3–2) on January 25, 2015. On February 20, 2015, he scored his first (and only) goal of the season, once again against Biel in yet another 3–2 win. As Bång's injury proved to be season-ending, Genoway also got to play most of the 7-game playoff series against Bern. LHC ended up losing that close matchup 2–1 in overtime in the deciding game. Interviewed by local newspaper 24 Heures during the 2014–15 playoffs, Genoway said that he'd like to stay at the club until the end of his contract in 2016 but not as a fifth wheel among imports (behind Hytönen, Bång, Louhivaara and Harri Pesonen) as was the case at the time.

=== KHL and Switzerland ===
Genoway ended up leaving Switzerland to join Medvescak Zagreb in the KHL on a one-year contract at the end of that season. On February 2, 2016, after Medvescak didn't qualify for the playoffs, he signed a deal for the rest of the season with HC Fribourg-Gottéron in the NLA he had left a few months before. According to Fribourg newspaper La Liberté, the Canadian center's contract with Zagreb was still valid and he should therefore start the following season in the KHL in spite of the original announcement that he had only been signed for a year. Eventually, the Zagreb team announced in July 2016, that Genoway would return for the 2016-17 campaign. He made 48 appearances for the team that season, scoring nine goals while assisting on 16 more. He then left Medvescak in January 2017 and signed with EHC Kloten of the Swiss NLA for the remainder of the 2016-17 campaign. He added 4 assists to his team's tally in 8 regular season games and scored 6 points (1 goal / 5 assists) in the end-of-season playouts. However, his contract was not renewed at the end of that stint and he subsequently signed yet another one-year deal with KHL team HC Slovan Bratislava.

=== Germany ===
On May 23, 2018, he signed as a free agent to a one-year deal with Kölner Haie of the German DEL.

== International play ==
In December 2014, Colby Genoway was selected by head coach Guy Boucher to represent Canada at the Spengler Cup in Davos for the second time after 2013. Genoway tallied two assists and Team Canada ended up losing to Genève-Servette in the semifinals. He joined Team Canada in Davos for the third time in December 2016. Genoway didn't score any points but his team ended up lifting the trophy after dismissing Lugano 5–2 in the final.

== Personal ==
Genoway's brother, Chay, also plays in the KHL and is a member of the Canadian men's ice hockey team at the 2018 Winter Olympics.

== Career statistics ==
			Regular season					Playoffs
Season	Team	League	GP	G	A	Pts	PIM	GP	G	A	Pts	PIM
1999–00	Winkler Flyers	MJHL	—	—	—	—	—	—	—	—	—	—
2000–01	Winkler Flyers	MJHL	61	23	42	65	0	—	—	—	—	—
2002–03	University of North Dakota	WCHA	31	1	2	3	24	—	—	—	—	—
2003–04	University of North Dakota	WCHA	40	11	23	34	22	—	—	—	—	—
2004–05	University of North Dakota	WCHA	42	13	31	44	38	—	—	—	—	—
2004–05	Hartford Wolf Pack	AHL	4	0	0	0	0	—	—	—	—	—
2005–06	Hartford Wolf Pack	AHL	77	26	35	61	78	13	4	8	12	10
2006–07	Portland Pirates	AHL	41	8	21	29	36	—	—	—	—	—
2006–07	Manitoba Moose	AHL	32	1	11	12	12	13	1	1	2	6
2007–08	Manitoba Moose	AHL	67	15	34	49	37	6	0	4	4	6
2008–09	Ilves Tampere	SM-l	11	7	7	14	8	—	—	—	—	—
2008–09	Mora IK	Allsv	30	13	17	30	61	—	—	—	—	—
2009–10	Ilves Tampere	SM-l	32	4	24	28	46	—	—	—	—	—
2009–10	HC Pardubice	ELH	10	3	4	7	6	—	—	—	—	—
2010–11	HC Lugano	NLA	41	12	18	30	80	—	—	—	—	—
2011–12	Lausanne HC	NLB	33	15	34	49	48	15	6	10	16	14
2012–13	Lausanne HC	NLB	39	24	42	66	58	11	6	18	24	10
2013–14	Lausanne HC	NLA	42	7	19	26	44	7	0	2	2	10
2014–15	Lausanne HC	NLA	15	1	5	6	2	6	0	0	0	0
2015–16	Medvescak Zagreb	KHL	48	4	12	16	34	—	—	—	—	—
2015–16	HC Fribourg-Gottéron	NLA	4	2	2	4	0	5	2	1	3	2
2016–17	Medvescak Zagreb	KHL	48	9	16	25	32	—	—	—	—	—
2016–17	EHC Kloten	NLA	8	0	4	4	27	6	1	5	6	2
2017–18	HC Slovan Bratislava	KHL	56	9	22	31	56	—	—	—	—	—
2018–19	Kölner Haie	DEL	49	11	15	26	40	11	1	3	4	24
2019–20	Kölner Haie	DEL	47	6	6	12	20	—	—	—	—	—
NLA totals			110	22	48	70	153	24	3	8	11	14
AHL totals			221	50	101	151	163	32	5	13	18	22
KHL totals			152	22	50	72	122	—	—	—	—	—
