= Petteri Wirtanen =

Finnish ice hockey player (born 1986)

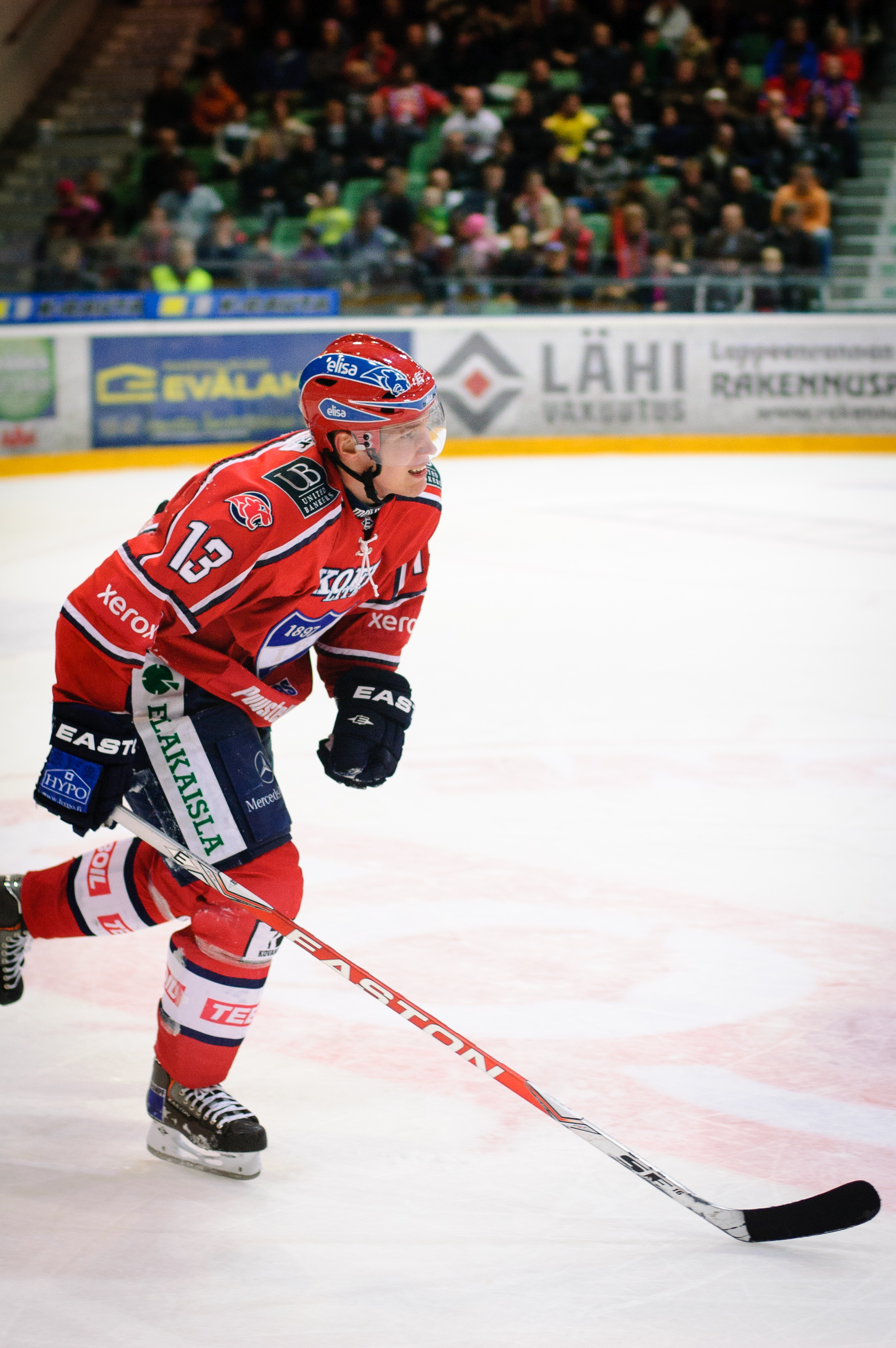
- Born: May 28, 1986 (age 40) Hyvinkää, Finland
- Height: 6 ft 1 in (185 cm)
- Weight: 196 lb (89 kg; 14 st 0 lb)
- Position: Centre
- Shot: Left
- Liiga team Former teams: TPS; HPK; Anaheim Ducks; HIFK; HC Donbass; HC Fribourg-Gottéron; Jokerit; Djurgårdens IF
- National team: Finland
- NHL draft: 172nd overall, 2006; Anaheim Ducks
- Playing career: 2004–2022

Petteri Wirtanen (born May 28, 1986) is a Finnish professional ice hockey Forward currently playing with HC TPS in the Liiga. Wirtanen was selected 172nd overall in the 6th round of the 2006 NHL entry draft by the Anaheim Ducks.

== Playing career ==
Wirtanen played as a youth within HPK. He made his professional debut with the club at the SM-liiga level during the 2004–05 season. In the following season he became a Finnish champion with HPK in 2006. He was signed to a three-year, entry-level contract with the Anaheim Ducks on July 27, 2006.

Wirtanen spent his first full North American season with the Ducks' American Hockey League affiliate, the Portland Pirates for the 2006–07 campaign. He recorded 7 goals and 18 points in 67 games. In the following season he made his NHL debut for the Ducks on October 17, 2007. Appearing in just 3 games for 1 goal.

At the conclusion of his rookie contract, Wirtanen opted to return to Finland in signing a multi-year contract with HIFK on July 28, 2009. He helped HIFK capture the Finnish Liiga title, his second, in 2011.

After stints with HC Donbass and HC Fribourg-Gottéron, Wirtanen returned to the KHL in signing an initial two-year contract with Finnish club, Jokerit, on November 14, 2014.

== Career statistics ==
=== Regular season and playoffs ===
			Regular season					Playoffs
Season	Team	League	GP	G	A	Pts	PIM	GP	G	A	Pts	PIM
2002–03	HPK	FIN U18	27	17	12	29	36	2	0	0	0	2
2003–04	HPK	FIN U18	7	2	3	5	10	2	0	0	0	0
2003–04	HPK	FIN U20	40	7	11	18	26	—	—	—	—	—
2004–05	HPK	FIN U20	37	12	22	34	38	—	—	—	—	—
2004–05	HPK	SM-l	8	0	0	0	0	—	—	—	—	—
2005–06	HPK	FIN U20	3	4	2	6	4	—	—	—	—	—
2005–06	HPK	SM-l	50	8	3	11	24	13	1	0	1	12
2006–07	Portland Pirates	AHL	67	7	11	18	40	—	—	—	—	—
2007–08	Portland Pirates	AHL	78	10	27	37	58	18	0	0	0	14
2007–08	Anaheim Ducks	NHL	3	1	0	1	2	—	—	—	—	—
2008–09	Iowa Chops	AHL	78	15	26	41	50	—	—	—	—	—
2009–10	HIFK	SM-l	56	10	17	27	32	6	4	1	5	4
2010–11	HIFK	SM-l	57	12	25	37	40	16	1	5	6	10
2011–12	HIFK	SM-l	55	14	20	34	67	4	0	0	0	33
2012–13	HC Donbass	KHL	52	5	11	16	28	—	—	—	—	—
2013–14	HC Donbass	KHL	50	6	9	15	28	13	1	2	3	22
2014–15	HC Fribourg–Gottéron	NLA	14	1	5	6	4	—	—	—	—	—
2014–15	Jokerit	KHL	32	7	5	12	20	10	0	1	1	4
2015–16	Jokerit	KHL	53	3	10	13	28	6	0	0	0	6
2016–17	Jokerit	KHL	42	3	6	9	18	4	0	1	1	2
2017–18	Jokerit	KHL	28	1	4	5	20	11	0	1	1	8
2018–19	TPS	Liiga	17	3	8	11	12	—	—	—	—	—
2018–19	Djurgårdens IF	SHL	33	4	5	9	18	19	1	4	5	8
2019–20	TPS	Liiga	59	7	8	15	34	—	—	—	—	—
2020–21	TPS	Liiga	54	4	8	12	55	9	2	0	2	2
2021–22	HIFK	Liiga	46	1	7	8	12	7	0	1	1	2
Liiga totals			402	59	96	155	276	55	8	7	15	63
NHL totals			3	1	0	1	2	—	—	—	—	—
KHL totals			257	25	45	70	142	44	1	5	6	42

Medal record

Representing Finland

Ice hockey

World Championships
Silver medal – second place	2014 Minsk	

=== International ===
Year	Team	Event	Result	GP	G	A	Pts	PIM
2004	Finland	WJC18	7th	6	0	2	2	6
2006	Finland	WJC	3rd place, bronze medalist(s)	7	0	1	1	2
2014	Finland	WC	2nd place, silver medalist(s)	3	0	0	0	2
Junior totals				13	0	3	3	8
Senior totals				3	0	0	0	2
