= Michael Wall (ice hockey) =

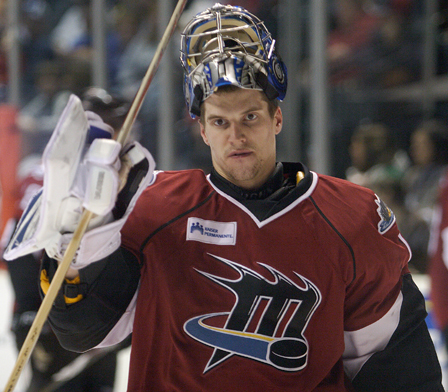
- Wall with the Lake Erie Monsters during the 2007-08 season
- Born: July 25, 1985 (age 40) Telkwa, British Columbia, Canada
- Height: 6 ft 2 in (188 cm)
- Weight: 205 lb (93 kg; 14 st 9 lb)
- Position: Goaltender
- Caught: Left
- Played for: Anaheim Ducks
- NHL draft: Undrafted
- Playing career: 2005–2008

Michael Wall (born July 25, 1985) is a Canadian former professional ice hockey goaltender who played in the National Hockey League with the Anaheim Ducks.

== Early life ==
Wall was born in Telkwa, British Columbia. He began his career by playing for the Prince George Cougars of the Western Hockey League. During his third season with the Cougars, he was moved to the new Everett Silvertips, where he finished his junior career.

== Career ==
Following the 2004–05 WHL season, Wall was signed to a three-year entry-level contract by the Anaheim Ducks on September 29, 2005.

He began his professional career immediately, making his first professional start with the Ducks' AHL affiliate, the Portland Pirates on October 8, 2005, and earning his first win on October 14 against the Providence Bruins. After he played in eight games with the Pirates, he was called up to the Ducks to back up Ilya Bryzgalov while Jean-Sébastien Giguère was injured. He then finished his rookie season by splitting time with the Ducks' ECHL affiliate, the Augusta Lynx, as well as the Pirates.

Wall began the season with the Pirates but was called up for his first NHL start on November 26, 2006, as both Bryzgalov and Giguère were injured at the same time. Wall picked up his first win that night against the Calgary Flames. He made four total appearances with the Ducks, including three starts, and on February 27, 2007, he was traded to the Colorado Avalanche for Brad May at the trade deadline. The Avalanche decided to move Wall to their CHL affiliate, the Arizona Sundogs where he scored a goal while playing with them which was just the 2nd goal by a goaltender in league history.

Wall Spent the 2007–08 season with Colorado's AHL affiliate, the Lake Erie Monsters in their inaugural season. Wall was a restricted free agent at the end of the season and was offered a contract by the Colorado Avalanche but turned it down.

Wall was the goaltender for his hometown Smithers Steelheads, an "AA" senior hockey club operating in the Central Interior Hockey League (CIHL).

== Records ==
- Everett Silvertips franchise record for best career save percentage: .928

== Career statistics ==
			Regular season									Playoffs
Season	Team	League	GP	W	L	OT	MIN	GA	SO	GAA	SV%	GP	W	L	MIN	GA	SO	GAA	SV%
2001–02	Prince George Cougars	WHL	3	0	1	1	107	7	0	3.92	.873	—	—	—	—	—	—	—	—
2002–03	Prince George Cougars	WHL	13	2	5	1	567	40	0	4.23	.882	—	—	—	—	—	—	—	—
2003–04	Prince George Cougars	WHL	1	1	0	0	60	6	0	6.00	.838	—	—	—	—	—	—	—	—
2003–04	Everett Silvertips	WHL	35	11	13	4	1657	59	2	2.14	.917	3	1	0	104	2	0	1.15	.966
2004–05	Everett Silvertips	WHL	56	24	21	8	3191	102	10	1.91	.926	11	4	7	697	25	1	2.15	.932
2005–06	Portland Pirates	AHL	11	5	5	0	603	34	1	3.38	.887	—	—	—	—	—	—	—	—
2005–06	Augusta Lynx	ECHL	21	8	11	1	1103	70	1	3.81	.879	—	—	—	—	—	—	—	—
2006–07	Portland Pirates	AHL	8	6	1	1	432	21	0	2.92	.886	—	—	—	—	—	—	—	—
2006–07	Anaheim Ducks	NHL	4	2	2	0	202	10	0	2.97	.877	—	—	—	—	—	—	—	—
2006–07	Arizona Sundogs	CHL	9	6	3	0	544	20	1	2.20	.917	14	7	7	795	38	2	2.87	.903
2007–08	Lake Erie Monsters	AHL	33	12	16	4	1946	103	1	3.18	.908	—	—	—	—	—	—	—	—
NHL totals			4	2	2	0	202	10	0	2.97	.877	—	—	—	—	—	—	—	—
