= Joe Rullier =

Canadian ice hockey player

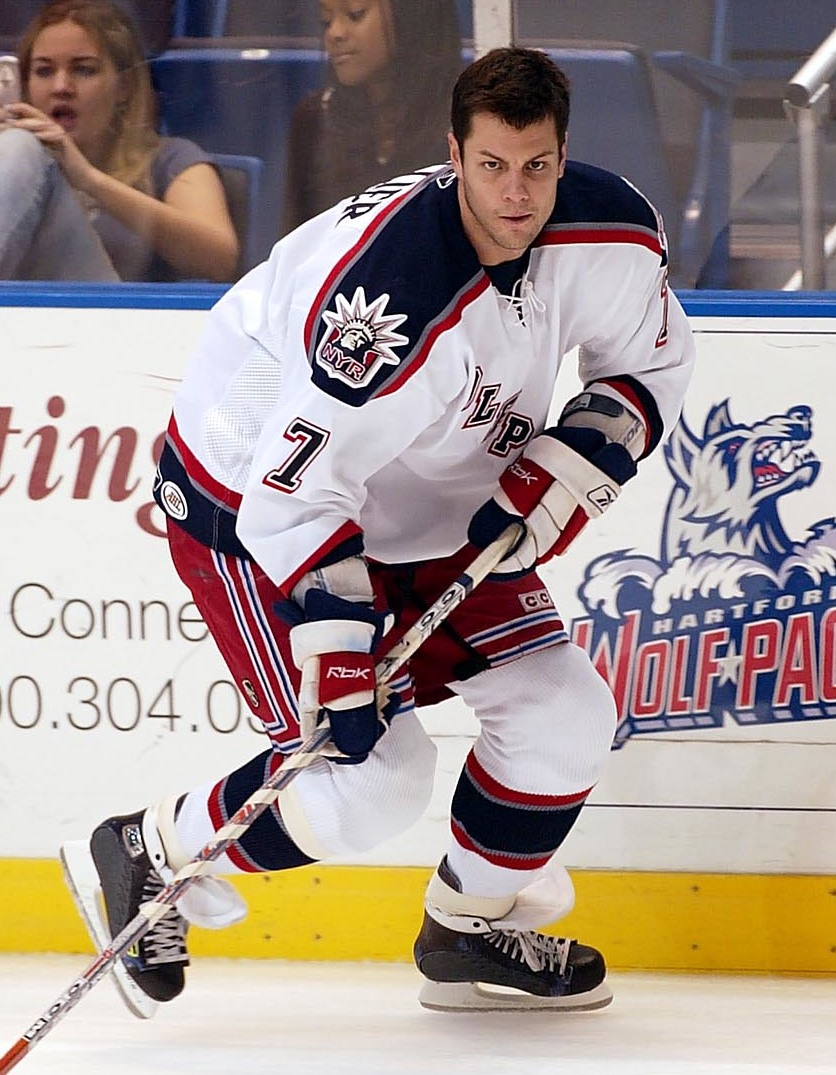
- Rullier with the Hartford Wolf Pack in 2005
- Born: January 28, 1980 (age 46) Montreal, Quebec, Canada
- Height: 6 ft 3 in (191 cm)
- Weight: 230 lb (104 kg; 16 st 6 lb)
- Position: Defence
- Shot: Right
- Played for: AHL; Lowell Lock Monsters; Manchester Monarchs; Hartford Wolf Pack; Manitoba Moose; Portland Pirates; Springfield Falcons; Bridgeport Sound Tigers; Binghamton Senators; ECHL; Bakersfield Condors; Swiss-A; Kloten Flyers; SM-liiga; HPK; Jokerit; Slovak Extraliga; Slovan Bratislava; LNAH; Laval Braves
- NHL draft: 133rd overall, 1998; Los Angeles Kings
- Playing career: 2000–2016

Joe Rullier (born January 28, 1980) is a Canadian former professional ice hockey defenceman. He last played for Laval Braves of the Ligue Nord-Américaine de Hockey (LNAH). Rullier was selected by the Los Angeles Kings in the fifth round (133rd overall) of the 1998 NHL entry draft.

Prior to turning professional, Rullier played four season for Rimouski Océanic from the 1996–1997 season until 1999-2000.

Rullier played 461 regular-season games in the American Hockey League for the Lowell Lock Monsters, Manchester Monarchs, Hartford Wolf Pack, Manitoba Moose, Portland Pirates, Springfield Falcons, Bridgeport Sound Tigers, and Binghamton Senators. He played the 2009-10 season with HC Slovan Bratislava of the Slovak Extraliga.

== Personal life ==
Rullier is married to Canadian fashion model Cathy Krcevinac. In February 2016, Krcevinac gave birth to their first child.
