= 2006–07 St. Louis Blues season =

National Hockey League team season

2006–07 St. Louis Blues
- Division: 3rd Central
- Conference: 10th Western
- 2006–07 record: 34–35–13
- Home record: 18–19–4
- Road record: 16–16–9
- Goals for: 214
- Goals against: 254

Team information
- General manager: Larry Pleau
- Coach: Mike Kitchen (Oct.–Dec.); Andy Murray (Dec.–Apr.)
- Captain: Dallas Drake
- Alternate captains: Bill Guerin (Oct.–Feb.); Barret Jackman; Doug Weight
- Arena: Scottrade Center
- Average attendance: 12,520 (59.6%)
- Minor league affiliates: Peoria Rivermen; Alaska Aces

Team leaders
- Goals: Lee Stempniak (27)
- Assists: Doug Weight (43)
- Points: Doug Weight (59)
- Penalty minutes: Keith Tkachuk (92)
- Plus/minus: Barret Jackman (+20)
- Wins: Manny Legace (23)
- Goals against average: Curtis Sanford (3.18)

The 2006–07 St. Louis Blues season, its 40th in the league, saw the team attempting to improve on the 2005–06 season, in which it had finished with the worst record in the National Hockey League (21–46–15, 57 points).

One major offseason transaction saw the Blues sign Doug Weight back to the roster via free agency, after he had left the team at the trade deadline of the 2005–06 season and won the Stanley Cup as a member of the Carolina Hurricanes.

One notable event of the season was the jersey retirement of Brett Hull's number 16 on December 5, 2006. In the ceremony, the Blues announced that a section of nearby Clark Avenue would be renamed Brett Hull Way. In front of a sellout crowd, the Blues then went on to lose a disappointing game 5–1 to the division rival Detroit Red Wings.

The team started the season very poorly, winning only seven of its first 30 games. Head coach Mike Kitchen was fired on December 11 and replaced with Andy Murray. A dramatic turn-around was made in mid-December, however, and over a 20-game span, the Blues went 13–3–4. By the end of January, St. Louis had pulled its record to near .500 and had climbed into third place in the Central Division standings.

The Blues missed the playoffs for the second straight year for the first time since the 1977–78 season and the 1978–79 season.

== Regular season ==
=== Final standings ===
Central Division
No.	CR		GP	W	L	OTL	GF	GA	Pts
1	1	**Detroit Red Wings**	82	50	19	13	254	199	113
2	4	**Nashville Predators**	82	51	23	8	272	212	110
3	10	St. Louis Blues	82	34	35	13	214	254	81
4	11	Columbus Blue Jackets	82	33	42	7	201	249	73
5	13	Chicago Blackhawks	82	31	42	9	201	258	71

Note: CR = Conference rank; GP = Games played; W = Wins; L = Losses; T = Ties; OTL = Overtime/shootout loss; GF = Goals for; GA = Goals against; PIM = Penalties in minutes; Pts = Points
Bolded teams qualified for the playoffs.

Western Conference
R		Div	GP	W	L	OTL	GF	GA	Pts
**1**	**z-Detroit Red Wings**	**CE**	**82**	**50**	**19**	**13**	**254**	**199**	**113**
**2**	**y-Anaheim Ducks**	**PA**	**82**	**48**	**20**	**14**	**258**	**208**	**110**
**3**	**y-Vancouver Canucks**	**NW**	**82**	**49**	**26**	**7**	**222**	**201**	**105**
**4**	**Nashville Predators**	**CE**	**82**	**51**	**23**	**8**	**272**	**212**	**110**
**5**	**San Jose Sharks**	**PA**	**82**	**51**	**26**	**5**	**258**	**199**	**107**
**6**	**Dallas Stars**	**PA**	**82**	**50**	**25**	**7**	**226**	**197**	**107**
**7**	**Minnesota Wild**	**NW**	**82**	**48**	**26**	**8**	**235**	**191**	**104**
**8**	**Calgary Flames**	**NW**	**82**	**43**	**29**	**10**	**258**	**226**	**96**
8.5
9	Colorado Avalanche	NW	82	44	31	7	272	251	95
10	St. Louis Blues	CE	82	34	35	13	214	254	81
11	Columbus Blue Jackets	CE	82	33	42	7	201	249	73
12	Edmonton Oilers	NW	82	32	43	7	195	248	71
13	Chicago Blackhawks	CE	82	31	42	9	201	258	71
14	Los Angeles Kings	PA	82	27	41	14	227	283	68
15	Phoenix Coyotes	PA	82	31	46	5	216	284	67

bold - qualified for playoffs, y - division title, z - best conference record
CE - Central Division, NW - Northwest Division, PA - Pacific Division

== Schedule and results ==
2006–07 regular season
October: 3–4–3 (home: 2–2–2; road: 1–2–1)

Game	Result	Date	Score	Opponent	Record	Recap
1	L	October 5, 2006	4–5 OT	@ San Jose Sharks (2006–07)	0–0–1	OTL
2	L	October 7, 2006	1–4	@ Los Angeles Kings (2006–07)	0–1–1	L
3	L	October 9, 2006	0–2	@ Anaheim Ducks (2006–07)	0–2–1	L
4	W	October 12, 2006	3–2 SO	Boston Bruins (2006–07)	1–2–1	W
5	W	October 14, 2006	4–3	Chicago Blackhawks (2006–07)	2–2–1	W
6	L	October 17, 2006	2–5	Phoenix Coyotes (2006–07)	2–3–1	L
7	L	October 20, 2006	2–3 OT	Vancouver Canucks (2006–07)	2–3–2	OTL
8	W	October 21, 2006	4–3	@ Chicago Blackhawks (2006–07)	3–3–2	W
9	L	October 28, 2006	2–3	Detroit Red Wings (2006–07)	3–4–2	L
10	L	October 30, 2006	5–6 SO	Anaheim Ducks (2006–07)	3–4–3	OTL

November: 4–10–0 (home: 2–5–0; road: 2–5–0)

Game	Result	Date	Score	Opponent	Record	Recap
11	L	November 1, 2006	1–4	@ Dallas Stars (2006–07)	3–5–3	L
12	W	November 2, 2006	4–1	Colorado Avalanche (2006–07)	4–5–3	W
13	L	November 4, 2006	2–3	Calgary Flames (2006–07)	4–6–3	L
14	L	November 9, 2006	2–4	Columbus Blue Jackets (2006–07)	4–7–3	L
15	L	November 10, 2006	1–3	@ Chicago Blackhawks (2006–07)	4–8–3	L
16	W	November 12, 2006	5–3	Edmonton Oilers (2006–07)	5–8–3	W
17	L	November 14, 2006	0–3	@ Calgary Flames (2006–07)	5–9–3	L
18	L	November 16, 2006	2–6	@ Edmonton Oilers (2006–07)	5–10–3	L
19	L	November 17, 2006	2–4	@ Vancouver Canucks (2006–07)	5–11–3	L
20	W	November 22, 2006	4–3 SO	@ Columbus Blue Jackets (2006–07)	6–11–3	W
21	W	November 24, 2006	3–2 SO	@ Detroit Red Wings (2006–07)	7–11–3	W
22	L	November 25, 2006	1–2	Phoenix Coyotes (2006–07)	7–12–3	L
23	L	November 28, 2006	0–2	San Jose Sharks (2006–07)	7–13–3	L
24	L	November 30, 2006	4–5	Nashville Predators (2006–07)	7–14–3	L

December: 5–5–4 (home: 3–3–1; road: 2–2–3)

Game	Result	Date	Score	Opponent	Record	Recap
25	L	December 1, 2006	2–5	@ Chicago Blackhawks (2006–07)	7–15–3	L
26	L	December 5, 2006	1–5	Detroit Red Wings (2006–07)	7–16–3	L
27	L	December 7, 2006	3–4 OT	@ Detroit Red Wings (2006–07)	7–16–4	OTL
28	L	December 9, 2006	1–5	Columbus Blue Jackets (2006–07)	7–17–4	L
29	L	December 12, 2006	2–3	Chicago Blackhawks (2006–07)	7–18–4	L
30	L	December 13, 2006	1–4	@ Colorado Avalanche (2006–07)	7–19–4	L
31	L	December 16, 2006	2–3 SO	@ Nashville Predators (2006–07)	7–19–5	OTL
32	L	December 17, 2006	1–2 OT	Nashville Predators (2006–07)	7–19–6	OTL
33	W	December 19, 2006	4–1	@ Pittsburgh Penguins (2006–07)	8–19–6	W
34	W	December 21, 2006	5–2	Los Angeles Kings (2006–07)	9–19–6	W
35	W	December 23, 2006	3–2 OT	Buffalo Sabres (2006–07)	10–19–6	W
36	L	December 26, 2006	2–3 SO	@ Nashville Predators (2006–07)	10–19–7	OTL
37	W	December 29, 2006	4–2	@ Colorado Avalanche (2006–07)	11–19–7	W
38	W	December 30, 2006	2–0	Colorado Avalanche (2006–07)	12–19–7	W

January: 8–4–1 (home: 3–3–0; road: 5–1–1)

Game	Result	Date	Score	Opponent	Record	Recap
39	L	January 2, 2007	1–4	Chicago Blackhawks (2006–07)	12–20–7	L
40	W	January 4, 2007	2–0	Chicago Blackhawks (2006–07)	13–20–7	W
41	L	January 6, 2007	2–3	@ Nashville Predators (2006–07)	13–21–7	L
42	W	January 9, 2007	4–3 SO	@ Columbus Blue Jackets (2006–07)	14–21–7	W
43	W	January 10, 2007	3–2	@ New Jersey Devils (2006–07)	15–21–7	W
44	W	January 13, 2007	6–5	Los Angeles Kings (2006–07)	16–21–7	W
45	L	January 15, 2007	4–5 SO	@ Phoenix Coyotes (2006–07)	16–21–8	OTL
46	W	January 16, 2007	6–2	@ Anaheim Ducks (2006–07)	17–21–8	W
47	W	January 18, 2007	3–1	@ Los Angeles Kings (2006–07)	18–21–8	W
48	W	January 20, 2007	1–0	@ San Jose Sharks (2006–07)	19–21–8	W
49	W	January 26, 2007	2–1 OT	Detroit Red Wings (2006–07)	20–21–8	W
50	L	January 27, 2007	3–6	Nashville Predators (2006–07)	20–22–8	L
51	L	January 30, 2007	2–5	Minnesota Wild (2006–07)	20–23–8	L

February: 7–4–1 (home: 6–2–0; road: 1–2–1)

Game	Result	Date	Score	Opponent	Record	Recap
52	L	February 2, 2007	3–5	@ Detroit Red Wings (2006–07)	20–24–8	L
53	W	February 3, 2007	2–0	Dallas Stars (2006–07)	21–24–8	W
54	L	February 6, 2007	1–2	Toronto Maple Leafs (2006–07)	21–25–8	L
55	W	February 8, 2007	1–0	Detroit Red Wings (2006–07)	22–25–8	W
56	L	February 10, 2007	3–4 OT	@ Philadelphia Flyers (2006–07)	22–25–9	OTL
57	L	February 13, 2007	5–6	San Jose Sharks (2006–07)	22–26–9	L
58	W	February 14, 2007	4–2	@ Columbus Blue Jackets (2006–07)	23–26–9	W
59	W	February 16, 2007	1–0	Nashville Predators (2006–07)	24–26–9	W
60	W	February 18, 2007	5–3	Minnesota Wild (2006–07)	25–26–9	W
61	W	February 20, 2007	5–4 SO	Columbus Blue Jackets (2006–07)	26–26–9	W
62	L	February 25, 2007	1–5	@ Chicago Blackhawks (2006–07)	26–27–9	L
63	W	February 27, 2007	3–1	Vancouver Canucks (2006–07)	27–27–9	W

March: 5–6–4 (home: 2–4–1; road: 3–2–3)

Game	Result	Date	Score	Opponent	Record	Recap
64	W	March 1, 2007	3–2 OT	@ New York Islanders (2006–07)	28–27–9	W
65	L	March 3, 2007	2–3 SO	@ New York Rangers (2006–07)	28–27–10	OTL
66	L	March 6, 2007	2–4	Calgary Flames (2006–07)	28–28–10	L
67	W	March 8, 2007	5–3	Dallas Stars (2006–07)	29–28–10	W
68	L	March 10, 2007	3–4	Montreal Canadiens (2006–07)	29–29–10	L
69	L	March 12, 2007	4–5 SO	@ Calgary Flames (2006–07)	29–29–11	OTL
70	L	March 15, 2007	2–3 OT	@ Vancouver Canucks (2006–07)	29–29–12	OTL
71	W	March 17, 2007	3–2 OT	@ Edmonton Oilers (2006–07)	30–29–12	W
72	L	March 20, 2007	2–4	Ottawa Senators (2006–07)	30–30–12	L
73	L	March 22, 2007	1–5	@ Minnesota Wild (2006–07)	30–31–12	L
74	W	March 24, 2007	3–2 SO	@ Detroit Red Wings (2006–07)	31–31–12	W
75	L	March 25, 2007	1–4	@ Columbus Blue Jackets (2006–07)	31–32–12	L
76	L	March 27, 2007	1–4	Columbus Blue Jackets (2006–07)	31–33–12	L
77	W	March 29, 2007	5–2	Edmonton Oilers (2006–07)	32–33–12	W
78	L	March 31, 2007	2–3 OT	Anaheim Ducks (2006–07)	32–33–13	OTL

April: 2–2–0 (home: 0–0–0; road: 2–2–0)

Game	Result	Date	Score	Opponent	Record	Recap
79	W	April 2, 2007	4–2	@ Dallas Stars (2006–07)	33–33–13	W
80	W	April 3, 2007	5–2	@ Phoenix Coyotes (2006–07)	34–33–13	W
81	L	April 5, 2007	1–4	@ Nashville Predators (2006–07)	34–34–13	L
82	L	April 7, 2007	1–5	@ Minnesota Wild (2006–07)	34–35–13	L

Legend: W Win (2 points) L Loss (0 points) OTL Overtime/shootout loss (1 point)

== Player statistics ==
=== Scoring ===
- Position abbreviations: C = Center; D = Defense; G = Goaltender; LW = Left wing; RW = Right wing
- † = Joined team via a transaction (e.g., trade, waivers, signing) during the season. Stats reflect time with the Blues only.
- ‡ = Left team via a transaction (e.g., trade, waivers, release) during the season. Stats reflect time with the Blues only.

No.	Player	Pos	Regular season					
No.	Player	Pos	GP	G	A	Pts	+/-	PIM
39	Doug Weight	C	82	16	43	59	10	56
12	Lee Stempniak	RW	82	27	25	52	−2	33
26	Petr Cajanek	RW	77	15	33	48	9	54
13	Bill Guerin‡	RW	61	28	19	47	8	52
7	Keith Tkachuk‡	LW	61	20	23	43	3	92
18	Radek Dvorak	RW	82	10	27	37	−6	48
9	Jay McClement	C	81	8	28	36	3	55
62	Martin Rucinsky	LW	52	12	21	33	−3	48
4	Eric Brewer	D	82	6	23	29	−10	69
5	Barret Jackman	D	70	3	24	27	20	82
42	David Backes	C	49	10	13	23	6	37
21	Jamal Mayers	RW	80	8	14	22	−19	89
25	Dennis Wideman‡	D	55	5	17	22	−7	44
55	Christian Backman	D	61	7	11	18	13	36
10	Dallas Drake	RW	60	6	6	12	−14	38
38	Brad Boyes†	C	19	4	8	12	0	4
17	Ryan Johnson	C	59	7	4	11	−7	47
58	Dan Hinote	RW	41	5	5	10	−8	23
27	Bryce Salvador	D	64	2	5	7	−5	55
29	Jeff Woywitka	D	34	1	6	7	4	12
22	Glen Metropolit†	C	20	2	3	5	0	14
28	Matt Walker	D	48	0	5	5	7	72
15	Peter Sejna	LW	22	3	1	4	2	4
20	Jamie Rivers	D	31	1	3	4	−7	36
19	D. J. King	C	27	1	1	2	−3	52
54	Tomas Mojzis	D	6	1	0	1	0	0
37	Mike Glumac	RW	3	0	1	1	1	0
30	Jason Bacashihua	G	19	0	0	0		2
34	Manny Legace	G	45	0	0	0		2
74	Jay McKee	D	23	0	0	0	−9	12
32	Ville Nieminen†	LW	14	0	0	0	−1	29
22	Joel Perrault†‡	C	11	0	0	0	−4	0
46	Roman Polak	D	19	0	0	0	−3	6
1	Curtis Sanford	G	31	0	0	0		0
40	Marek Schwarz	G	2	0	0	0		0

=== Goaltending ===
No.	Player	Regular season									
No.	Player	GP	W	L	OT	SA	GA	GAA	SV%	SO	TOI
34	Manny Legace	45	23	15	5	1177	109	2.59	.907	5	2522
1	Curtis Sanford	31	8	12	5	707	79	3.19	.888	0	1492
30	Jason Bacashihua	19	3	7	3	450	47	3.16	.896	0	894
40	Marek Schwarz	2	0	1	0	25	3	3.00	.880	0	60

== Awards and records ==
=== Awards ===
Type	Award/honor	Recipient	Ref
League (in-season)	NHL All-Star Game selection	Bill Guerin	
League (in-season)	NHL Second Star of the Week	Manny Legace (December 24)	
League (in-season)	NHL YoungStars Game selection	Lee Stempniak	

=== Milestones ===
Milestone	Player	Date	Ref
First game	D. J. King	October 5, 2006	
First game	Roman Polak	October 9, 2006	
First game	Marek Schwarz	December 12, 2006	
First game	David Backes	December 19, 2006	
1,000th game played	Doug Weight	November 16, 2006	
1,000th game played	Bill Guerin	February 2, 2007	

== Transactions ==
The Blues were involved in the following transactions from June 20, 2006, the day after the deciding game of the 2006 Stanley Cup Finals, through June 6, 2007, the day of the deciding game of the 2007 Stanley Cup Finals.

=== Trades ===
Date	Details		Ref
June 24, 2006	To St. Louis Blues: 1st-round pick in 2006	To New Jersey Devils: 1st-round pick in 2006; 3rd-round pick in 2006	
January 16, 2007	To St. Louis Blues: Yan Stastny	To Boston Bruins: 5th-round pick in 2007	
February 25, 2007	To St. Louis Blues: Glen Metropolit; 1st-round pick in 2007; 3rd round pick in 2007; 2nd-round pick in 2008; Conditional 1st-round pick in 2008 (Note: Condition not met. The Blues would have received this pick if Tkachuk re-signed with Atlanta. St. Louis re-acquired Tkachuk from Atlanta on June 26 and re-signed him on June 30.)	To Atlanta Thrashers: Keith Tkachuk	
February 27, 2007	To St. Louis Blues: Ville Nieminen; Rights to Jay Barriball; New Jersey's 1st-round pick in 2007	To San Jose Sharks: Bill Guerin	
February 27, 2007	To St. Louis Blues: Brad Boyes	To Boston Bruins: Dennis Wideman	

=== Players acquired ===
Date	Player	Former team	Term	Via	Ref
July 1, 2006	Jay McKee	Buffalo Sabres	4-year	Free agency	
July 2, 2006	Doug Weight	Carolina Hurricanes	2-year	Free agency	
July 3, 2006	Bill Guerin	Dallas Stars	1-year	Free agency	
July 3, 2006	Dan Hinote	Colorado Avalanche	3-year	Free agency	
August 2, 2006	Martin Rucinsky	New York Rangers		Free agency	
August 8, 2006	Manny Legace	Detroit Red Wings		Free agency	
August 9, 2006	Jamie Rivers	Phoenix Coyotes		Free agency	
September 14, 2006	Radek Dvorak	Edmonton Oilers		Free agency	
September 30, 2006	Denis Pederson	Eisbaren Berlin (DEL)	1-year	Free agency	
October 31, 2006	Joel Perrault	Phoenix Coyotes		Waivers	
January 1, 2007	Charles Linglet	Peoria Rivermen (AHL)		Free agency	
March 21, 2007	Steve Wagner	Minnesota State University, Mankato (WCHA)	2-year	Free agency	
June 1, 2007	Martin Kariya	Espoo Blues (Liiga)		Free agency	
June 1, 2007	Juuso Riksman	Jokerit (Liiga)		Free agency	

=== Players lost ===
Date	Player	New team	Via (Note: In parentheses is the player's free agency group on July 1 if applicable.)	Ref
July 1, 2006	Patrick Lalime	Chicago Blackhawks	Free agency (III)	
July 10, 2006	Kevin Dallman	Los Angeles Kings	Free agency (VI)	
July 12, 2006	Mark Rycroft	Colorado Avalanche	Free agency (UFA)	
July 21, 2006	Jeff Hoggan	Boston Bruins	Free agency (VI)	
July 21, 2006	Andy Roach	Eisbaren Berlin (DEL)	Free agency (III)	
July 21, 2006	Michael Zigomanis	Phoenix Coyotes	Free agency (VI)	
July 25, 2006	Trevor Byrne	Washington Capitals	Free agency (UFA)	
July 27, 2006	Reed Low	Chicago Blackhawks	Free agency (III)	
August 1, 2006	Troy Riddle	Adler Mannheim (DEL)	Free agency (UFA)	
August 2, 2006	Jesse Boulerice	Carolina Hurricanes	Free agency (UFA)	
August 2, 2006	Dean McAmmond	Ottawa Senators	Free agency (III)	
August 30, 2006	Timofei Shishkanov	HC Vityaz Chekhov (RSL)	Free agency (II) (Note: St. Louis retained Shishkanov's NHL rights through the 2009–10 season.)	
September 15, 2006	Scott Young		Retirement (III)	
October 2006	Colin Hemingway	Bridgeport Sound Tigers (AHL)	Free agency (UFA)	
October 8, 2006	Denis Pederson	Eisbaren Berlin (DEL)	Retirement (Note: Pederson resumed his career a month later, signing with Eisbaren Berlin on November 3.)	
December 19, 2006	Joel Perrault	Phoenix Coyotes	Waivers	
December 26, 2006	Steve Poapst		Retirement (III) (Note: Poapst was named head coach of the Chicago Steel of the USHL.)	
May 21, 2007	Tomas Mojzis	HC Sibir Novosibirsk (RSL)	Free agency	

=== Signings ===
Date	Player	Term	Contract type	Ref
June 29, 2006	Ryan Johnson		Re-signing	
June 29, 2006	Matt Walker		Re-signing	
July 1, 2006	Dallas Drake	multi-year	Re-signing	
July 4, 2006	Peter Cajanek	multi-year	Re-signing	
July 17, 2006	Jason Bacashihua	1-year	Re-signing	
July 17, 2006	Eric Brewer	1-year	Re-signing	
July 17, 2006	Jon DiSalvatore	1-year	Re-signing	
July 17, 2006	Doug Lynch	1-year	Re-signing	
July 17, 2006	Aaron MacKenzie		Re-signing	
July 17, 2006	Jay McClement	multi-year	Re-signing	
July 17, 2006	Tomas Mojzis	1-year	Re-signing	
July 17, 2006	Peter Sejna	1-year	Re-signing	
July 17, 2006	Jeff Woywitka	1-year	Re-signing	
August 9, 2006	Christian Backman	multi-year	Re-signing	
February 24, 2007	Eric Brewer	4-year	Extension	
February 24, 2007	Manny Legace	2-year	Extension	
February 27, 2007	Jamal Mayers	3-year	Extension	
April 19, 2007	Erik Johnson		Entry-level	
April 24, 2007	Trent Whitfield		Extension	
May 23, 2007	Nick Drazenovic		Entry-level	
May 23, 2007	Alexander Hellstrom		Entry-level	
May 23, 2007	Tomas Kana		Entry-level	
May 23, 2007	Ryan Reaves		Entry-level	
June 1, 2007	Patrik Berglund		Entry-level	
June 1, 2007	Jonas Junland		Entry-level	
June 1, 2007	Nikolai Lemtyugov		Entry-level	

== Draft picks ==
St. Louis' picks at the 2006 NHL entry draft in Vancouver, British Columbia. The Blues possessed the first overall pick in the draft.

Round	#	Player	Nationality	NHL team	College/Junior/Club team (League)
1	1	Erik Johnson (D)	United States	St. Louis Blues	US National Team Development Program (NAHL)
1	25	Patrik Berglund (C)	Sweden	St. Louis Blues (from New Jersey)	VIK Vasteras HK (Allsvenskan)
2	31	Tomas Kana (C)	Czech Republic	St. Louis Blues	HC Vitkovice (Czech Extraliga)
3	64	Jonas Junland (D)	Sweden	St. Louis Blues	Linkopings HC (Elitserien)
4	94	Ryan Turek (C)	United States	St. Louis Blues	Omaha Lancers (USHL)
4	106	Reto Berra (G)	Switzerland	St. Louis Blues (from Toronto)	ZSC Lions (NLA)
5	124	Andy Sackrison (C/LW)	United States	St. Louis Blues	St. Louis Park (USHS-MN)
6	154	Matthew McCollem (LW)	United States	St. Louis Blues	Belmont Hill (Independent School League)
7	184	Alexander Hellstrom (D)	Sweden	St. Louis Blues	IF Bjorkloven (Allsvenskan)

== See also ==
- 2006–07 NHL season
