= 2006–07 Phoenix Coyotes season =

NHL hockey team season

2006–07 Phoenix Coyotes
- Division: 5th Pacific
- Conference: 15th Western
- 2006–07 record: 31–46–5
- Home record: 18–20–3
- Road record: 13–26–2
- Goals for: 216
- Goals against: 284

Team information
- General manager: Mike Barnett
- Coach: Wayne Gretzky
- Captain: Shane Doan
- Alternate captains: Ed Jovanovski; Derek Morris; Ladislav Nagy (Oct.–Feb.); Owen Nolan; Steven Reinprecht (Feb.–Apr.)
- Arena: Jobing.com Arena
- Average attendance: 17,799
- Minor league affiliates: San Antonio Rampage; Phoenix Roadrunners; Laredo Bucks

Team leaders
- Goals: Shane Doan (27)
- Assists: Shane Doan (28)
- Points: Shane Doan (55)
- Penalty minutes: Josh Gratton (188)
- Plus/minus: Travis Roche (+2)
- Wins: Curtis Joseph (18)
- Goals against average: Curtis Joseph (3.19)

The 2006–07 Phoenix Coyotes season was the franchise's 35th season overall, 28th season in the National Hockey League and 11th season in Phoenix. The team began rebuilding as they tried to become good enough to be a factor in the increasingly competitive Western Conference. Not considered one of the "elite" teams in the West, the Phoenix Coyotes knew that they had to make some huge changes to reach that status. They tried to do so by acquiring defenseman Ed Jovanovski and former all-stars Jeremy Roenick and Owen Nolan. They hoped to get solid goaltending from Curtis Joseph, and with the former hockey great Wayne Gretzky as head coach, the Coyotes were looking to improve the game of their prospects with the leadership of their veteran players.

For the fourth consecutive year, the Coyotes failed to make the playoffs.

== Regular season ==
The Coyotes struggled in shorthanded situations, allowing 92 power-play goals: the most in the League.

=== Season standings ===
Pacific Division
No.	CR		GP	W	L	OTL	GF	GA	Pts
1	2	**Anaheim Ducks**	82	48	20	14	258	208	110
2	5	**San Jose Sharks**	82	51	26	5	258	199	107
3	6	**Dallas Stars**	82	50	25	7	226	197	107
4	14	Los Angeles Kings	82	27	41	14	227	283	68
5	15	Phoenix Coyotes	82	31	46	5	216	284	67

Note: CR = Conference rank; GP = Games played; W = Wins; L = Losses; T = Ties; OTL = Overtime/shootout loss; GF = Goals for; GA = Goals against; PIM = Penalties in minutes; Pts = Points
Bolded teams qualified for the playoffs.

Western Conference
R		Div	GP	W	L	OTL	GF	GA	Pts
**1**	**z-Detroit Red Wings**	**CE**	**82**	**50**	**19**	**13**	**254**	**199**	**113**
**2**	**y-Anaheim Ducks**	**PA**	**82**	**48**	**20**	**14**	**258**	**208**	**110**
**3**	**y-Vancouver Canucks**	**NW**	**82**	**49**	**26**	**7**	**222**	**201**	**105**
**4**	**Nashville Predators**	**CE**	**82**	**51**	**23**	**8**	**272**	**212**	**110**
**5**	**San Jose Sharks**	**PA**	**82**	**51**	**26**	**5**	**258**	**199**	**107**
**6**	**Dallas Stars**	**PA**	**82**	**50**	**25**	**7**	**226**	**197**	**107**
**7**	**Minnesota Wild**	**NW**	**82**	**48**	**26**	**8**	**235**	**191**	**104**
**8**	**Calgary Flames**	**NW**	**82**	**43**	**29**	**10**	**258**	**226**	**96**
8.5
9	Colorado Avalanche	NW	82	44	31	7	272	251	95
10	St. Louis Blues	CE	82	34	35	13	214	254	81
11	Columbus Blue Jackets	CE	82	33	42	7	201	249	73
12	Edmonton Oilers	NW	82	32	43	7	195	248	71
13	Chicago Blackhawks	CE	82	31	42	9	201	258	71
14	Los Angeles Kings	PA	82	27	41	14	227	283	68
15	Phoenix Coyotes	PA	82	31	46	5	216	284	67

bold - qualified for playoffs, y - division title, z - best conference record
CE - Central Division, NW - Northwest Division, PA - Pacific Division

== Schedule and results ==
2006–07 regular season
October: 3–9–0 (home: 2–4–0; road: 1–5–0)

Game	Date	Visitor	Score	Home	OT	Decision	Attendance	Record	Points	Recap
1	October 5	NY Islanders	3 – 6	Phoenix		Joseph	15,301	1–0–0	2	W
2	October 7	Anaheim	2 – 1	Phoenix		Joseph	15,897	1–1–0	2	L
3	October 9	Phoenix	1 – 5	Columbus		Morrison	16,298	1–2–0	2	L
4	October 11	Phoenix	2 – 9	Detroit		Joseph	20,066	1–3–0	2	L
5	October 14	Phoenix	1 – 4	Nashville		Joseph	13,770	1–4–0	2	L
6	October 17	Phoenix	5 – 2	St. Louis		Joseph	8,531	2–4–0	4	W
7	October 19	Los Angeles	4 – 0	Phoenix		Morrison	12,714	2–5–0	4	L
8	October 21	Dallas	4 – 0	Phoenix		Joseph	14,269	2–6–0	4	L
9	October 23	Phoenix	2 – 5	Edmonton		Joseph	16,839	2–7–0	4	L
10	October 24	Phoenix	1 – 6	Calgary		Morrison	19,289	2–8–0	4	L
11	October 26	Edmonton	2 – 6	Phoenix		LeNeveu	13,021	3–8–0	6	W
12	October 28	NY Rangers	7 – 3	Phoenix		LeNeveu	14,513	3–9–0	6	L

November: 6–6–0 (home: 5–2–0; road: 1–4–0)

Game	Date	Visitor	Score	Home	OT	Decision	Attendance	Record	Points	Recap
13	November 3	Phoenix	2 – 6	Anaheim		Joseph	14,833	3–10–0	6	L
14	November 4	Los Angeles	4 – 6	Phoenix		LeNeveu	14,631	4–10–0	8	W
15	November 9	Dallas	1 – 0	Phoenix		Joseph	13,197	4–11–0	8	L
16	November 11	San Jose	2 – 1	Phoenix		Joseph	15,036	4–12–0	8	L
17	November 14	Minnesota	3 – 4	Phoenix		Joseph	12,002	5–12–0	10	W
18	November 16	Chicago	2 – 3	Phoenix	SO	Joseph	15,963	6–12–0	12	W
19	November 18	Phoenix	3 – 5	Los Angeles		Joseph	14,487	6–13–0	12	L
20	November 19	Phoenix	4 – 6	Anaheim		Joseph	16,394	6–14–0	12	L
21	November 22	New Jersey	1 – 3	Phoenix		Joseph	12,883	7–14–0	14	W
22	November 24	Phoenix	0 – 4	Minnesota		Joseph	18,568	7–15–0	14	L
23	November 25	Phoenix	2 – 1	St. Louis		Joseph	13,440	8–15–0	16	W
24	November 30	Los Angeles	4 – 7	Phoenix		Joseph	11,526	9–15–0	18	W

December: 6–5–2 (home: 4–2–1; road: 2–3–1)

Game	Date	Visitor	Score	Home	OT	Decision	Attendance	Record	Points	Recap
25	December 4	Nashville	2 – 3	Phoenix		Tellqvist	11,735	10–15–0	20	W
26	December 6	Phoenix	0 – 3	Dallas		Joseph	16,927	10–16–0	20	L
27	December 7	Phoenix	2 – 1	Chicago	SO	Tellqvist	9,078	11–16–0	22	W
28	December 9	Dallas	4 – 3	Phoenix	OT	Tellqvist	15,320	11–16–1	23	OTL
29	December 11	Phoenix	0 – 4	San Jose		Joseph	16,717	11–17–1	23	L
30	December 12	Phoenix	2 – 5	Vancouver		Tellqvist	18,630	11–18–1	23	L
31	December 14	Columbus	4 – 5	Phoenix	SO	Tellqvist	11,301	12–18–1	25	W
32	December 16	Calgary	6 – 3	Phoenix		Tellqvist	15,551	12–19–1	23	L
33	December 21	Edmonton	3 – 2	Phoenix		Joseph	12,704	12–20–1	25	L
34	December 23	Anaheim	0 – 2	Phoenix		Tellqvist	14,843	13–20–1	27	W
35	December 26	Phoenix	3 – 4	Los Angeles	SO	Tellqvist	18,118	13–20–2	28	OTL
36	December 28	Phoenix	3 – 2	San Jose		Joseph	17,496	14–20–2	30	W
37	December 30	San Jose	0 – 8	Phoenix		Joseph	17,643	15–20–2	32	W

January: 8–6–0 (home: 1–3–0; road: 7–3–0)

Game	Date	Visitor	Score	Home	OT	Decision	Attendance	Record	Points	Recap
38	January 1	Phoenix	3 – 2	Washington		Tellqvist	12,579	16–20–2	34	W
39	January 4	Phoenix	2 – 0	Carolina		Joseph	15,096	17–20–2	36	W
40	January 5	Phoenix	5 – 4	Atlanta	OT	Joseph	18,545	18–20–2	38	W
41	January 7	Phoenix	4 – 2	Chicago		Tellqvist	11,079	19–20–2	40	W
42	January 9	Phoenix	5 – 2	Dallas		Tellqvist	18,532	20–20–2	42	W
43	January 11	Detroit	5 – 1	Phoenix		Tellqvist	14,386	20–21–2	42	L
44	January 13	San Jose	4 – 1	Phoenix		Joseph	16,642	20–22–2	42	L
45	January 15	St. Louis	4 – 5	Phoenix	SO	Tellqvist	15,533	21–22–2	44	W
46	January 17	Phoenix	3 – 4	Colorado		Joseph	17,183	21–23–2	44	L
47	January 18	Phoenix	2 – 5	San Jose		Tellqvist	17,496	21–24–2	44	L
48	January 20	Phoenix	3 – 2	Los Angeles		Tellqvist	18,346	22–24–2	46	W
49	January 26	Phoenix	5 – 4	Colorado	SO	Joseph	18,007	23–24–2	48	W
50	January 27	Pittsburgh	7 – 2	Phoenix		Tellqvist	18,495	23–25–2	48	L
51	January 31	Phoenix	1 – 2	Anaheim		Joseph	17,174	23–26–2	48	L

February: 4–7–1 (home: 2–2–1; road: 2–5–0)

Game	Date	Visitor	Score	Home	OT	Decision	Attendance	Record	Points	Recap
52	February 1	Nashville	2 – 3	Phoenix		Joseph	14,047	24–26–2	50	W
53	February 3	Minnesota	1 – 0	Phoenix		Joseph	17,115	24–27–2	50	L
54	February 6	Phoenix	3 – 0	Columbus		Joseph	13,825	25–27–2	52	W
55	February 7	Phoenix	2 – 4	Detroit		Joseph	20,066	25–28–2	52	L
56	February 10	Phoenix	2 – 5	Florida		Joseph	15,312	25–29–2	52	L
57	February 13	Phoenix	3 – 5	Tampa Bay		Tellqvist	18,019	25–30–2	52	L
58	February 15	Anaheim	5 – 4	Phoenix	OT	Joseph	15,038	25–30–3	53	OTL
59	February 17	Detroit	4 – 1	Phoenix		Tellqvist	16,940	25–31–3	53	L
60	February 19	Phoenix	1 – 4	Nashville		Joseph	15,862	25–32–3	53	L
61	February 22	Calgary	2 – 3	Phoenix	OT	Tellqvist	15,805	26–32–3	55	W
62	February 26	Phoenix	2 – 5	Calgary		Tellqvist	19,289	26–33–3	55	L
63	February 27	Phoenix	3 – 0	Edmonton		Joseph	16,839	27–33–3	57	W

March: 2–11–2 (home: 2–6–1; road: 0–5–1)

Game	Date	Visitor	Score	Home	OT	Decision	Attendance	Record	Points	Recap
64	March 1	Phoenix	3 – 4	Vancouver		Joseph	18,630	27–34–3	57	L
65	March 3	Columbus	4 – 3	Phoenix		Joseph	16,207	27–35–3	57	L
66	March 7	Phoenix	1 – 2	Anaheim		Tellqvist	17,174	27–36–3	57	L
67	March 8	Vancouver	4 – 2	Phoenix		Joseph	13,841	27–37–3	57	L
68	March 10	Chicago	7 – 5	Phoenix		Joseph	17,086	27–38–3	57	L
69	March 12	Philadelphia	0 – 4	Phoenix		Tellqvist	14,799	28–38–3	59	W
70	March 15	San Jose	5 – 1	Phoenix		Tellqvist	14,744	28–39–3	59	L
71	March 17	Colorado	6 – 3	Phoenix		Joseph	17,179	28–40–3	59	L
72	March 18	Phoenix	4 – 5	Dallas	OT	Tellqvist	18,318	28–40–4	60	OTL
73	March 20	Phoenix	2 – 3	Minnesota		Joseph	18,568	28–41–4	60	L
74	March 22	Anaheim	1 – 2	Phoenix		Joseph	15,593	29–41–4	62	W
75	March 24	Dallas	4 – 3	Phoenix	SO	Joseph	17,522	29–41–5	63	OTL
76	March 27	Phoenix	0 – 6	Dallas		Tellqvist	18,532	29–42–5	63	L
77	March 29	Colorado	3 – 4	Phoenix		Joseph	16,110	29–43–5	63	L
78	March 30	Phoenix	2 – 4	San Jose		Joseph	17,496	29–44–5	63	L

April: 2–2–0 (home: 2–1–0; road: 0–1–0)

Game	Date	Visitor	Score	Home	OT	Decision	Attendance	Record	Points	Recap
79	April 3	St. Louis	5 – 2	Phoenix		Joseph	14,016	29–45–4	63	L
80	April 5	Los Angeles	2 – 3	Phoenix		Joseph	15,965	30–45–5	65	W
81	April 7	Phoenix	1 – 2	Los Angeles		Joseph	18,118	30–46–5	65	L
82	April 8	Vancouver	1 – 3	Phoenix		Joseph	17,406	31–46–5	67	W

Legend: W Win (2 points) L Loss (0 points) OTL Overtime/shootout loss (1 point)

== Player statistics ==
=== Scoring ===
- Position abbreviations: C = Center; D = Defense; G = Goaltender; LW = Left wing; RW = Right wing
- † = Joined team via a transaction (e.g., trade, waivers, signing) during the season. Stats reflect time with the Coyotes only.
- ‡ = Left team via a transaction (e.g., trade, waivers, release) during the season. Stats reflect time with the Coyotes only.

No.	Player	Pos	Regular season					
No.	Player	Pos	GP	G	A	Pts	+/-	PIM
19	Shane Doan	RW	73	27	28	55	−14	73
17	Ladislav Nagy‡	LW	55	8	33	41	−2	48
11	Owen Nolan	RW	76	16	24	40	−2	56
91	Oleg Saprykin‡	LW	59	14	20	34	8	54
94	Yanic Perreault†‡	C	49	19	14	33	−2	30
28	Steve Reinprecht	C	49	9	24	33	−3	28
55	Ed Jovanovski	D	54	11	18	29	−6	63
97	Jeremy Roenick	C	70	11	17	28	−18	32
4	Zbynek Michalek	D	82	4	24	28	−20	34
2	Keith Ballard	D	69	5	22	27	−7	59
53	Derek Morris	D	82	6	19	25	−18	115
15	Michael Zigomanis	C	75	14	9	23	−8	46
37	Georges Laraque‡	RW	56	5	17	22	7	52
89	Mike Comrie‡	C	24	7	13	20	1	20
77 (Note: Roche wore number 76 through January 9.)	Travis Roche	D	50	6	13	19	2	22
20	Fredrik Sjostrom	RW	78	9	9	18	−11	48
21	Bill Thomas	RW	24	8	6	14	−6	2
44	Nick Boynton	D	59	2	9	11	−13	138
12	Patrick Fischer	C	27	4	6	10	0	24
22	Mathias Tjarnqvist†	RW	26	5	4	9	−2	2
8	Niko Kapanen†	C	19	2	7	9	−11	8
38	Dave Scatchard	C	46	3	5	8	−18	72
14	Kevyn Adams†	C	33	1	7	8	−10	8
13	Daniel Carcillo†	LW	18	4	3	7	−7	74
5	Matt Jones	D	45	1	6	7	−12	39
23	Jeff Taffe	C	17	4	2	6	−7	2
29	Yanick Lehoux	C	7	1	2	3	−1	4
26	Joel Perrault‡†	C	15	1	2	3	−3	14
24	Josh Gratton	LW	52	1	1	2	−9	188
90	Enver Lisin	RW	17	1	1	2	−18	16
23	Donald MacLean	C	9	1	1	2	−4	0
22	Dennis Seidenberg‡	D	32	1	1	2	−4	16
6	Brendan Bell†	D	14	0	2	2	−8	8
3	Keith Yandle	D	7	0	2	2	0	8
40	Mike Ricci	C	7	0	1	1	−1	4
32	Mikael Tellqvist†	G	30	0	1	1		0
31	Curtis Joseph	G	55	0	0	0		10
30	David LeNeveu	G	6	0	0	0		0
1	Mike Morrison	G	4	0	0	0		0

=== Goaltending ===
- † = Joined team via a transaction (e.g., trade, waivers, signing) during the season. Stats reflect time with the Coyotes only.

No.	Player	Regular season									
No.	Player	GP	W	L	OT	SA	GA	GAA	SV%	SO	TOI
31	Curtis Joseph	55	18	31	2	1481	159	3.19	.893	4	2993
32	Mikael Tellqvist†	30	11	11	3	780	90	3.39	.885	2	1591
30	David LeNeveu	6	2	1	0	142	15	3.86	.894	0	233
1	Mike Morrison	4	0	3	0	62	13	6.13	.790	0	127

== Awards and records ==
=== Awards ===
Type	Award/honor	Recipient	Ref
League (in-season)	NHL All-Star Game selection	Ed Jovanovski (Note: Jovanovski was an injury replacement for Scott Niedermayer of the Anaheim Ducks.)	
League (in-season)	NHL All-Star Game selection	Yanic Perreault	
Team	Hardest Working Player Award	Keith Ballard	
Team	Leading Scorer Award	Shane Doan	
Team	Man of the Year Award	Josh Gratton	
Team	Team MVP Award	Shane Doan	
Team	Three-Star Award	Shane Doan	

=== Milestones ===
Milestone	Player	Date	Ref
First game	Patrick Fischer	October 5, 2006	
First game	Keith Yandle	October 11, 2006	
First game	Enver Lisin	October 14, 2006	
First game	Daniel Carcillo	March 3, 2007	

== Transactions ==
The Coyotes were involved in the following transactions from June 20, 2006, the day after the deciding game of the 2006 Stanley Cup Final, through June 6, 2007, the day of the deciding game of the 2007 Stanley Cup Final.

=== Trades ===
Date	Details		Ref
June 24, 2006	To Phoenix Coyotes: 1st-round pick in 2006; 5th-round pick in 2006	To Detroit Red Wings: Florida's 2nd-round pick in 2006; Tampa Bay's 2nd-round pick in 2006	
June 24, 2006	To Phoenix Coyotes: New Jersey's 3rd-round pick in 2006	To New York Islanders: Philadelphia's 4th-round pick in 2006; Calgary's 4th-round pick in 2006	
June 24, 2006	To Phoenix Coyotes: Boston's 7th-round pick in 2006; 7th-round pick in 2006	To Toronto Maple Leafs: 6th-round pick in 2006	
June 26, 2006	To Phoenix Coyotes: Nick Boynton; 4th-round pick in 2007	To Boston Bruins: Paul Mara; 3rd-round pick in 2007 or 2008	
July 12, 2006	To Phoenix Coyotes: 4th-round pick in 2007	To Montreal Canadiens: Mike Johnson	
November 14, 2006	To Phoenix Coyotes: Tyler Redenbach	To Boston Bruins: Philippe Sauve	
November 28, 2006	To Phoenix Coyotes: Mikael Tellqvist	To Toronto Maple Leafs: Tyson Nash; 4th-round pick in 2007	
January 3, 2007	To Phoenix Coyotes: Alexei Kaigorodov	To Ottawa Senators: Mike Comrie	
January 8, 2007	To Phoenix Coyotes: Kevyn Adams	To Carolina Hurricanes: Dennis Seidenberg	
February 12, 2007	To Phoenix Coyotes: Mathias Tjarnqvist; 1st-round pick in 2007	To Dallas Stars: Ladislav Nagy	
February 27, 2007	To Phoenix Coyotes: 2nd-round pick in 2008	To Ottawa Senators: Oleg Saprykin; 7th-round pick in 2007	
February 27, 2007	To Phoenix Coyotes: Brendan Bell; 2nd-round pick in 2008	To Toronto Maple Leafs: Yanic Perreault; 5th-round pick in 2008	
February 27, 2007	To Phoenix Coyotes: Daniel Carcillo; 3rd-round pick in 2008	To Pittsburgh Penguins: Georges Laraque	

=== Players acquired ===
Date	Player	Former team	Term	Via	Ref
July 1, 2006	Ed Jovanovski	Vancouver Canucks	5-year	Free agency	
July 2, 2006	Mike Morrison	Ottawa Senators	1-year	Free agency	
July 3, 2006	Josh Tordjman	Moncton Wildcats (QMJHL)		Free agency	
July 4, 2006	Jeremy Roenick	Los Angeles Kings	1-year	Free agency	
July 5, 2006	Georges Laraque	Edmonton Oilers	2-year	Free agency	
July 17, 2006	Donald MacLean	Detroit Red Wings	2-year	Free agency	
July 19, 2006	Bryan Helmer	Detroit Red Wings	2-year	Free agency	
July 20, 2006	Travis Roche	Atlanta Thrashers	2-year	Free agency	
July 21, 2006	Michael Zigomanis	St. Louis Blues	2-year	Free agency	
August 16, 2006	Owen Nolan	Toronto Maple Leafs	1-year	Free agency	
October 29, 2006	Yanic Perreault	Nashville Predators	1-year	Free agency	
December 19, 2006	Joel Perrault	St. Louis Blues		Waivers	
February 27, 2007	Niko Kapanen	Atlanta Thrashers		Waivers	
March 15, 2007	Alex Leavitt	San Antonio Rampage (AHL)	multi-year	Free agency	

=== Players lost ===
Date	Player	New team	Via (Note: In parentheses is the player's free agency group on July 1 if applicable.)	Ref
N/A	Oleg Kvasha	HC Vityaz Chekhov (RSL)	Free agency (III)	
N/A	Frantisek Lukes	HC Litvinov (ELH)	Free agency (UFA)	
July 1, 2006	Landon Bathe (Note: Bathe suffered a career-ending knee injury during the 2005–06 season.)		Contract expiration (UFA)	
July 1, 2006	Steve Gainey (Note: Gainey retired.)		Contract expiration (VI)	
July 1, 2006	Darren McLachlan (Note: McLachlan, who last played during the 2004–05 season, retired.)		Contract expiration (UFA)	
July 1, 2006	Ray Schultz (Note: Schultz retired.)		Contract expiration (III)	
July 1, 2006	Steven Spencer (Note: Spencer retired.)		Contract expiration (UFA)	
July 3, 2006	Martin Podlesak	HC Sparta Praha (ELH)	Free agency (UFA)	
July 19, 2006	Geoff Sanderson	Philadelphia Flyers	Free agency (III)	
August 9, 2006	Jamie Rivers	St. Louis Blues	Free agency (III)	
September 27, 2006	Dwayne Zinger	Providence Bruins (AHL)	Free agency (III)	
October 6, 2006	Boyd Devereaux	Toronto Maple Leafs	Free agency (III)	
October 20, 2006	Chris McAllister	Kalamazoo Wings (UHL)	Free agency (III)	
October 31, 2006	Ladislav Kouba	Laredo Bucks (CHL)	Free agency (UFA)	
October 31, 2006	Joel Perreault	St. Louis Blues	Waivers	
November 8, 2006	Mike Bishai	HC Dynamo Moscow (RSL)	Free agency (VI)	
November 9, 2006	Eric Chouinard	HC Sierre (NLB)	Free agency (UFA)	

=== Signings ===
Date	Player	Term	Contract type	Ref
June 28, 2006	Nick Boynton	3-year	Re-signing	
July 10, 2006	Josh Gratton	1-year	Re-signing	
July 13, 2006	Dennis Seidenberg	2-year	Re-signing	
July 13, 2006	Fredrik Sjostrom	2-year	Re-signing	
July 16, 2006	Oleg Saprykin	1-year	Re-signing	
July 16, 2006	Philippe Sauve	1-year	Re-signing	
July 16, 2006	Matthew Spiller	1-year	Re-signing	
July 21, 2006	David LeNeveu	1-year	Re-signing	
July 21, 2006	Jeff Taffe		Re-signing	
August 4, 2006	Mike Comrie	1-year	Re-signing	
August 7, 2006	Ladislav Nagy	1-year	Arbitration award	
February 15, 2007	Shane Doan	5-year	Extension	
February 16, 2007	Mikael Tellqvist	2-year	Extension	
February 16, 2007	Michael Zigomanis	2-year	Extension	
February 27, 2007	Kevyn Adams	1-year	Extension	
March 27, 2007	Sean Sullivan	multi-year	Entry-level	
May 31, 2007	Martin Hanzal	3-year	Entry-level	

== Draft picks ==
Phoenix's picks at the 2006 NHL entry draft in Vancouver, British Columbia.

Round	#	Player	Nationality	NHL team	College/Junior/Club team (League)
1	8	Peter Mueller (C)	United States	Phoenix Coyotes	Everett (WHL)
1	29	Chris Summers (D)	United States	Phoenix Coyotes (from Detroit)	US Under-18 (Int'l)
3	88	Jonas Ahnelov (D)	Sweden	Phoenix Coyotes (from New Jersey)	Frölunda HC (Elitserien)
5	130	Brett Bennett (G)	United States	Phoenix Coyotes (from NY Islanders)	US Under-18 (Int'l)
5	131	Martin Latal (RW)	Czech Republic	Phoenix Coyotes	HC Rabat Kladno (Czech Republic)
5	152	Jordan Bendfeld (D)	Canada	Phoenix Coyotes (from Detroit)	Medicine Hat (WHL)
7	188	Chris Frank (D)	United States	Phoenix Coyotes (from Boston)	Western Michigan (CCHA)
7	196	Benn Ferriero (C/RW)	United States	Phoenix Coyotes (from Toronto)	Boston College (Hockey East)

== See also ==
- 2006–07 NHL season
