= 2006–07 Edmonton Oilers season =

NHL team season

2006–07 Edmonton Oilers
- Division: 5th Northwest
- Conference: 12th Western
- 2006–07 record: 32–43–7
- Home record: 19–19–3
- Road record: 13–24–4
- Goals for: 195
- Goals against: 248

Team information
- General manager: Kevin Lowe
- Coach: Craig MacTavish
- Captain: Jason Smith
- Alternate captains: Shawn Horcoff (Feb.–Apr.); Ethan Moreau; Ryan Smyth (Oct.–Feb.); Steve Staios (Feb.–Apr.)
- Arena: Rexall Place
- Average attendance: 16,839 (100%)
- Minor league affiliates: Hamilton Bulldogs (AHL); Wilkes-Barre/Scranton Penguins (AHL); Stockton Thunder (ECHL)

Team leaders
- Goals: Ryan Smyth (31)
- Assists: Ales Hemsky (40)
- Points: Ryan Smyth (53); Petr Sykora (53); Ales Hemsky (53)
- Penalty minutes: Matt Greene (109)
- Plus/minus: Daniel Tjarnqvist (+3)
- Wins: Dwayne Roloson (27)
- Goals against average: Dwayne Roloson (2.75)

The 2006–07 Edmonton Oilers season began on October 5, 2006. It was the Oilers' 35th season, 28th in the NHL. After making it to the 2006 Stanley Cup Final, the club had a disappointing season, finishing out of the playoffs.

Prior to the season the club experienced the stunning loss of star defenceman Chris Pronger. After helping the Oilers to the Stanley Cup Final in the 2005–06 season, Pronger requested a trade for personal reasons. In early July, Pronger was sent to the Anaheim Ducks for Joffrey Lupul, Ladislav Smid and various draft picks.

Not only did Pronger leave, but another major acquisition from the previous season, Michael Peca, was signed by the Toronto Maple Leafs as a free agent. Despite the losses in personnel, the Oilers had a very strong start to the season, briefly propelling them to the top of the Northwest Division standings. The Oilers would slowly fall back of the pack however, finding themselves well out of a playoff spot by the trade deadline.

At the deadline, the Oilers again stunned the NHL by trading their leading scorer, and pending Unrestricted free agent, Ryan Smyth to the New York Islanders for two prospects and a first-round draft pick. Reports later indicated that Smyth and the Oilers were only $100,000 apart in contract negotiations when the Oilers chose to make the trade.

On the same night as the Smyth trade, the Oilers retired former captain Mark Messier's number 11 sweater. The celebration of Messier also included having a street named after him in Edmonton. Oilers general manager, and Messier's former teammate, Kevin Lowe was noticeably absent from the retirement ceremony. Messier won five Stanley Cups with the Oilers during his time in Edmonton.

The Oilers set new marks in this season for both success and failure. Edmonton recorded its 1,000th regular season win in the NHL on January 2, 2007, while late in the season, the Oilers lost 12 consecutive games, a mark that surpassed Edmonton's previous record of 11. However, the NHL does not now consider an overtime loss a true loss, thus the feat did not officially break the franchise record for losses.

The Oilers were eliminated from playoff contention for the first time since the 2003–04 season for the third time in their last five seasons. With the Carolina Hurricanes also failing to qualify for the post-season, it marked the first time in NHL history that the previous season's finalists both failed to qualify for the playoffs.

In May 2007, Daryl Katz offered $145 million towards the purchase of the team. Sources close to the Edmonton Journal state that, as part of the deal, the team will remain in Edmonton. No negotiations took place as the owners immediately responded that the Oilers were not for sale.

== Regular season ==
Excluding shootout goals scored, the Oilers had the fewest goals scored of all 30 NHL teams, with just 192.

=== Season standings ===
Northwest Division
No.	CR		GP	W	L	OTL	GF	GA	Pts
1	3	**Vancouver Canucks**	82	49	26	7	222	201	105
2	7	**Minnesota Wild**	82	48	26	8	235	191	104
3	8	**Calgary Flames**	82	43	29	10	258	226	96
4	9	Colorado Avalanche	82	44	31	7	272	251	95
5	12	Edmonton Oilers	82	32	43	7	195	248	71

Note: CR = Conference rank; GP = Games played; W = Wins; L = Losses; T = Ties; OTL = Overtime/shootout loss; GF = Goals for; GA = Goals against; PIM = Penalties in minutes; Pts = Points
Bolded teams qualified for the playoffs.

Western Conference
R		Div	GP	W	L	OTL	GF	GA	Pts
**1**	**z-Detroit Red Wings**	**CE**	**82**	**50**	**19**	**13**	**254**	**199**	**113**
**2**	**y-Anaheim Ducks**	**PA**	**82**	**48**	**20**	**14**	**258**	**208**	**110**
**3**	**y-Vancouver Canucks**	**NW**	**82**	**49**	**26**	**7**	**222**	**201**	**105**
**4**	**Nashville Predators**	**CE**	**82**	**51**	**23**	**8**	**272**	**212**	**110**
**5**	**San Jose Sharks**	**PA**	**82**	**51**	**26**	**5**	**258**	**199**	**107**
**6**	**Dallas Stars**	**PA**	**82**	**50**	**25**	**7**	**226**	**197**	**107**
**7**	**Minnesota Wild**	**NW**	**82**	**48**	**26**	**8**	**235**	**191**	**104**
**8**	**Calgary Flames**	**NW**	**82**	**43**	**29**	**10**	**258**	**226**	**96**
8.5
9	Colorado Avalanche	NW	82	44	31	7	272	251	95
10	St. Louis Blues	CE	82	34	35	13	214	254	81
11	Columbus Blue Jackets	CE	82	33	42	7	201	249	73
12	Edmonton Oilers	NW	82	32	43	7	195	248	71
13	Chicago Blackhawks	CE	82	31	42	9	201	258	71
14	Los Angeles Kings	PA	82	27	41	14	227	283	68
15	Phoenix Coyotes	PA	82	31	46	5	216	284	67

bold - qualified for playoffs, y - division title, z - best conference record
CE - Central Division, NW - Northwest Division, PA - Pacific Division

== Schedule and results ==
2006–07 regular season
October: 7–4–0 (home: 6–0–0; road: 1–4–0)

Game	Date	Visitor	Score	Home	OT	Decision	Attendance	Record	Points	Recap
1	October 5	Calgary Flames	1 – 3	Edmonton Oilers		Roloson	16,839	1–0–0	2	W
2	October 7	Edmonton Oilers	1 – 2	Calgary Flames		Roloson	19,289	1–1–0	2	L
3	October 12	San Jose Sharks	4 – 6	Edmonton Oilers		Roloson	16,839	2–1–0	4	W
4	October 14	Edmonton Oilers	4 – 3	Colorado Avalanche		Roloson	18,007	3–1–0	6	W
5	October 16	Edmonton Oilers	1 – 2	Vancouver Canucks		Roloson	18,630	3–2–0	6	L
6	October 17	Vancouver Canucks	1 – 2	Edmonton Oilers		Markkanen	16,839	4–2–0	8	W
7	October 21	Detroit Red Wings	1 – 3	Edmonton Oilers		Roloson	16,839	5–2–0	10	W
8	October 23	Phoenix Coyotes	2 – 5	Edmonton Oilers		Roloson	16,839	6–2–0	12	W
9	October 25	Edmonton Oilers	2 – 6	Anaheim Ducks		Roloson	13,537	6–3–0	12	L
10	October 26	Edmonton Oilers	2 – 6	Phoenix Coyotes		Markkanen	13,021	6–4–0	12	L
11	October 28	Washington Capitals	0 – 4	Edmonton Oilers		Roloson	16,839	7–4–0	14	W

November: 6–5–2 (home: 4–3–1; road: 2–2–1)

Game	Date	Visitor	Score	Home	OT	Decision	Attendance	Record	Points	Recap
12	November 1	Nashville Predators	5 – 3	Edmonton Oilers		Roloson	16,839	7–5–0	14	L
13	November 3	Dallas Stars	3 – 2	Edmonton Oilers		Roloson	16,839	7–6–0	14	L
14	November 7	Edmonton Oilers	2 – 3	Montreal Canadiens	SO	Roloson	21,273	7–6–1	15	OTL
15	November 8	Edmonton Oilers	0 – 3	Detroit Red Wings		Roloson	20,066	7–7–1	15	L
16	November 10	Edmonton Oilers	4 – 1	Columbus Blue Jackets		Roloson	16,902	8–7–1	17	W
17	November 12	Edmonton Oilers	3 – 5	St. Louis Blues		Markkanen	9,214	8–8–1	17	L
18	November 13	Edmonton Oilers	2 – 1	Colorado Avalanche		Roloson	17,725	9–8–1	19	W
19	November 16	St. Louis Blues	2 – 6	Edmonton Oilers		Roloson	16,839	10–8–1	21	W
20	November 18	Detroit Red Wings	3 – 4	Edmonton Oilers	SO	Roloson	16,839	11–8–1	23	W
21	November 21	Calgary Flames	1 – 2	Edmonton Oilers		Roloson	16,839	12–8–1	25	W
22	November 24	Chicago Blackhawks	1 – 5	Edmonton Oilers		Roloson	16,839	13–8–1	27	W
23	November 28	Anaheim Ducks	3 – 2	Edmonton Oilers	OT	Roloson	16,839	13–8–2	28	OTL
24	November 30	Colorado Avalanche	7 – 3	Edmonton Oilers		Roloson	16,839	13–9–2	28	L

December: 5–9–0 (home: 2–4–0; road: 3–5–0)

Game	Date	Visitor	Score	Home	OT	Decision	Attendance	Record	Points	Recap
25	December 2	Columbus Blue Jackets	4 – 0	Edmonton Oilers		Roloson	16,839	13–10–2	28	L
26	December 4	Edmonton Oilers	4 – 0	Vancouver Canucks		Roloson	18,630	14–10–2	30	W
27	December 6	Carolina Hurricanes	1 – 3	Edmonton Oilers		Markkanen	16,839	15–10–2	32	W
28	December 8	Edmonton Oilers	2 – 0	Dallas Stars		Roloson	17,182	16–10–2	34	W
29	December 10	Edmonton Oilers	1 – 4	Chicago Blackhawks		Roloson	11,523	16–11–2	34	L
30	December 12	Edmonton Oilers	2 – 3	Nashville Predators		Roloson	12,032	16–12–2	34	L
31	December 14	Minnesota Wild	1 – 3	Edmonton Oilers		Roloson	16,839	17–12–2	36	W
32	December 15	Edmonton Oilers	1 – 4	Colorado Avalanche		Roloson	17,589	17–13–2	36	L
33	December 19	Colorado Avalanche	7 – 6	Edmonton Oilers		Roloson	16,839	17–14–2	36	L
34	December 21	Edmonton Oilers	3 – 2	Phoenix Coyotes		Markkanen	12,704	18–14–2	38	W
35	December 23	Edmonton Oilers	2 – 3	Dallas Stars		Roloson	18,136	18–15–2	38	L
36	December 28	Los Angeles Kings	7 – 4	Edmonton Oilers		Roloson	16,839	18–16–2	38	L
37	December 30	Vancouver Canucks	6 – 2	Edmonton Oilers		Markkanen	16,839	18–17–2	38	L
38	December 31	Edmonton Oilers	2 – 4	Calgary Flames		Roloson	19,289	18–18–2	38	L

January: 7–4–2 (home: 4–3–1; road: 3–1–1)

Game	Date	Visitor	Score	Home	OT	Decision	Attendance	Record	Points	Recap
39	January 2	Florida Panthers	1 – 4	Edmonton Oilers		Roloson	16,839	19–18–2	40	W
40	January 4	Dallas Stars	6 – 5	Edmonton Oilers	SO	Roloson	16,839	19–18–3	41	OTL
41	January 5	Edmonton Oilers	2 – 3	Vancouver Canucks	OT	Roloson	18,630	19–18–4	42	OTL
42	January 8	Edmonton Oilers	2 – 1	Los Angeles Kings	OT	Roloson	16,224	20–18–4	44	W
43	January 10	Edmonton Oilers	3 – 2	San Jose Sharks		Roloson	17,496	21–18–4	46	W
44	January 12	Minnesota Wild	4 – 2	Edmonton Oilers		Roloson	16,839	21–19–4	46	L
45	January 13	Edmonton Oilers	1 – 3	Calgary Flames		Roloson	19,289	21–20–4	46	L
46	January 16	Edmonton Oilers	2 – 1	Minnesota Wild		Roloson	18,568	22–20–4	48	W
47	January 18	Anaheim Ducks	1 – 4	Edmonton Oilers		Roloson	16,839	23–20–4	50	W
48	January 20	Calgary Flames	4 – 0	Edmonton Oilers		Roloson	16,839	23–21–4	50	L
49	January 26	San Jose Sharks	5 – 1	Edmonton Oilers		Roloson	16,839	23–22–4	50	L
50	January 27	Los Angeles Kings	3 – 4	Edmonton Oilers		Markkanen	16,839	24–22–4	52	W
51	January 31	Columbus Blue Jackets	2 – 5	Edmonton Oilers		Markkanen	16,839	25–22–4	54	W

February: 5–6–2 (home: 2–2–0; road: 3–4–2)

Game	Date	Visitor	Score	Home	OT	Decision	Attendance	Record	Points	Recap
52	February 1	Edmonton Oilers	3 – 5	Vancouver Canucks		Roloson	18,630	25–23–4	54	L
53	February 3	Edmonton Oilers	3 – 2	Colorado Avalanche		Roloson	17,645	26–23–4	56	W
54	February 6	Vancouver Canucks	5 – 2	Edmonton Oilers		Roloson	16,839	26–24–4	56	L
55	February 9	Chicago Blackhawks	1 – 2	Edmonton Oilers		Roloson	16,839	27–24–4	58	W
56	February 11	Atlanta Thrashers	1 – 5	Edmonton Oilers		Roloson	16,839	28–24–4	60	W
57	February 13	Edmonton Oilers	0 – 3	Boston Bruins		Roloson	16,449	28–25–4	60	L
58	February 15	Edmonton Oilers	1 – 2	Buffalo Sabres	OT	Roloson	18,690	28–25–5	61	OTL
59	February 17	Edmonton Oilers	3 – 4	Toronto Maple Leafs		Roloson	19,599	28–26–5	61	L
60	February 20	Edmonton Oilers	3 – 4	Ottawa Senators	SO	Markkanen	19,716	28–26–6	62	OTL
61	February 22	Edmonton Oilers	4 – 0	Columbus Blue Jackets		Roloson	15,541	29–26–6	64	W
62	February 23	Edmonton Oilers	4 – 3	Detroit Red Wings	SO	Roloson	20,066	30–26–6	66	W
63	February 25	Edmonton Oilers	1 – 4	Minnesota Wild		Roloson	18,568	30–27–6	66	L
64	February 27	Phoenix Coyotes	3 – 0	Edmonton Oilers		Roloson	16,839	30–28–6	66	L

March: 1–12–1 (home: 1–7–1; road: 0–5–0)

Game	Date	Visitor	Score	Home	OT	Decision	Attendance	Record	Points	Recap
65	March 1	Minnesota Wild	5 – 0	Edmonton Oilers		Roloson	16,839	30–29–6	66	L
66	March 3	Calgary Flames	4 – 2	Edmonton Oilers		Roloson	16,839	30–30–6	66	L
67	March 7	Tampa Bay Lightning	3 – 1	Edmonton Oilers		Markkanen	16,839	30–31–6	66	L
68	March 9	Edmonton Oilers	1 – 5	Anaheim Ducks		Roloson	17,174	30–32–6	66	L
69	March 11	Edmonton Oilers	0 – 3	San Jose Sharks		Roloson	17,496	30–33–6	66	L
70	March 12	Edmonton Oilers	1 – 5	Los Angeles Kings		Markkanen	16,954	30–34–6	66	L
71	March 15	Minnesota Wild	2 – 1	Edmonton Oilers		Roloson	16,839	30–35–6	66	L
72	March 17	St. Louis Blues	3 – 2	Edmonton Oilers	OT	Roloson	16,839	30–35–7	67	OTL
73	March 19	Vancouver Canucks	2 – 1	Edmonton Oilers		Roloson	16,839	30–36–7	67	L
74	March 21	Colorado Avalanche	5 – 1	Edmonton Oilers		Roloson	16,839	30–37–7	67	L
75	March 23	Colorado Avalanche	3 – 4	Edmonton Oilers	SO	Roloson	16,839	31–37–7	69	W
76	March 24	Nashville Predators	4 – 0	Edmonton Oilers		Markkanen	16,839	31–38–7	69	L
77	March 27	Edmonton Oilers	3 – 4	Nashville Predators		Roloson	16,382	31–39–7	69	L
78	March 29	Edmonton Oilers	2 – 5	St. Louis Blues		Markkanen	13,745	31–40–7	69	L

April: 1–3–0 (home: 0–0–0; road: 1–3–0)

Game	Date	Visitor	Score	Home	OT	Decision	Attendance	Record	Points	Recap
79	April 1	Edmonton Oilers	1 – 2	Chicago Blackhawks		Roloson	12,193	31–41–7	69	L
80	April 3	Edmonton Oilers	0 – 3	Minnesota Wild		Markkanen	18,568	31–42–7	69	L
81	April 5	Edmonton Oilers	0 – 3	Minnesota Wild		Markannen	18,568	31–43–7	69	L
82	April 7	Edmonton Oilers	3 – 2	Calgary Flames		Roloson	19,289	32–43–7	71	W

Legend: W Win (2 points) L Loss (0 points) OTL Overtime/shootout loss (1 point)

== Player statistics ==
=== Scoring ===
- Position abbreviations: C = Centre; D = Defence; G = Goaltender; LW = Left wing; RW = Right wing
- † = Joined team via a transaction (e.g., trade, waivers, signing) during the season. Stats reflect time with the Oilers only.
- ‡ = Left team via a transaction (e.g., trade, waivers, release) during the season. Stats reflect time with the Oilers only.

No.	Player	Pos	Regular season					
No.	Player	Pos	GP	G	A	Pts	+/-	PIM
94	Ryan Smyth‡	LW	53	31	22	53	2	38
71	Petr Sykora	C	82	22	31	53	−20	40
83	Ales Hemsky	RW	64	13	40	53	−7	40
10	Shawn Horcoff	C	80	16	35	51	−22	56
16	Jarret Stoll	C	51	13	26	39	2	48
14	Raffi Torres	LW	82	15	19	34	−7	88
15	Joffrey Lupul	RW	81	16	12	28	−29	45
34	Fernando Pisani	RW	77	14	14	28	−1	40
47	Marc-Andre Bergeron‡	D	55	8	17	25	−9	28
19	Marty Reasoner	C	72	6	14	20	−15	60
24	Steve Staios	D	58	2	15	17	−5	97
28	Patrick Thoresen	LW	68	4	12	16	−1	52
20 (Note: Petersen wore number 45 in his first game.)	Toby Petersen	C	64	6	9	15	−18	4
29	Daniel Tjarnqvist	D	37	3	12	15	3	30
78	Marc-Antoine Pouliot	C	46	4	7	11	−2	18
21	Jason Smith	D	82	2	9	11	−13	103
5	Ladislav Smid	D	77	3	7	10	−16	37
2	Matt Greene	D	78	1	9	10	−22	109
26	Brad Winchester	LW	59	4	5	9	−10	86
25	Jan Hejda	D	39	1	8	9	−6	20
77	Tom Gilbert	D	12	1	5	6	−1	0
93	Petr Nedved†	C	19	1	4	5	−5	10
35	Dwayne Roloson	G	68	0	3	3		12
36	Mathieu Roy	D	16	2	0	2	−7	30
23	Kyle Brodziak	C	6	1	0	1	0	2
18	Ethan Moreau	LW	7	1	0	1	−4	12
12	Robert Nilsson†	C	4	1	0	1	−1	4
46	Zack Stortini	RW	29	1	0	1	−7	105
40	Danny Syvret	D	16	0	1	1	−10	6
60	Sebastien Bisaillon	D	2	0	0	0	−1	0
22	Jean-Francois Jacques	LW	37	0	0	0	−11	33
30	Jussi Markkanen	G	22	0	0	0		0
8	Alexei Mikhnov	LW	2	0	0	0	0	0
44	Rob Schremp	C	1	0	0	0	0	0
76	Bryan Young	D	15	0	0	0	−8	10

=== Goaltending ===
No.	Player	Regular season									
No.	Player	GP	W	L	OT	SA	GA	GAA	SV%	SO	TOI
35	Dwayne Roloson	68	27	34	6	1969	180	2.75	.909	4	3932
30	Jussi Markkanen	22	5	9	1	457	52	3.14	.886	0	992

== Awards and records ==
=== Awards ===
Type	Award/honour	Recipient	Ref
League (in-season)	NHL All-Star Game selection	Ryan Smyth	
League (in-season)	NHL Third Star of the Week	Ryan Smyth (January 28)	
League (in-season)	NHL YoungStars Game selection	Ladislav Smid	
Team	Community Service Award	Jarret Stoll	
Team	Defenceman of the Year	Jason Smith	
Team	Molson Cup	Dwayne Roloson	
Team	Most Popular Player	Dwayne Roloson	
Team	Top Defensive Forward	Fernando Pisani	
Team	Top First Year Oiler	Ladislav Smid	
Team	Unsung Hero	Marty Reasoner	
Team	Zane Feldman Trophy	Dwayne Roloson	

=== Records ===
- 2:01: New Oilers record for fastest hat trick by Ryan Smyth on October 12, 2006.

=== Milestones ===
Regular season
Player	Milestone	Reached
Fernando Pisani	100th NHL PIM	October 5, 2006
Ladislav Smid	1st NHL Game	October 5, 2006
Patrick Thoresen	1st NHL Game	October 5, 2006
Ales Hemsky	100th NHL PIM	October 12, 2006
Ladislav Smid	1st NHL Assist; 1st NHL Point	October 12, 2006
Ryan Smyth	500th NHL Point; 5th NHL Hat-trick; 3rd NHL Natural Hat-trick	October 12, 2006
Patrick Thoresen	1st NHL Goal; 1st NHL Point	October 12, 2006
Dwayne Roloson	100th NHL Win	October 14, 2006
Daniel Tjarnqvist	100th NHL PIM	October 17, 2006
Patrick Thoresen	1st NHL Assist	October 21, 2006
Raffi Torres	200th NHL Game	October 21, 2006
Alexei Mikhnov	1st NHL Game	October 23, 2006
Fernando Pisani	200th NHL Game	October 25, 2006
Jarret Stoll	100th NHL Point	October 28, 2006
Jan Hejda	1st NHL Game	November 3, 2006
Dwayne Roloson	300th NHL Game	November 3, 2006
Jason Smith	800th NHL Game	November 7, 2006
Brad Winchester	1st NHL Goal	November 7, 2006
Steve Staios	900th NHL PIM	November 8, 2006
Jan Hejda	1st NHL Assist	November 10, 2006
Petr Sykora	300th NHL PIM	November 12, 2006
Petr Sykora	700th NHL Game	November 13, 2006
Toby Petersen	200th NHL Game	November 16, 2006
Joffrey Lupul	100th NHL Game	November 30, 2006
Petr Sykora	300th NHL Assist	November 30, 2006
Daniel Tjarnqvist	300th NHL Game	December 2, 2006
Dwayne Roloson	20th NHL Shutout	December 4, 2006
Matt Greene	1st NHL Goal	December 14, 2006
Ales Hemsky	300th NHL Game	December 15, 2006
Shawn Horcoff	200th NHL Point	December 21, 2006
Raffi Torres	100th NHL Point	December 21, 2006
Joffrey Lupul	100th NHL PIM	December 28, 2006
Jan Hejda	1st NHL Goal; 1st NHL Point	January 8, 2007
Tom Gilbert	1st NHL Game	January 10, 2007
Matt Greene	100th NHL PIM	January 10, 2007
Mathieu Roy	1st NHL Goal; 1st NHL Point	January 10, 2007
Jason Smith	900th NHL PIM	January 10, 2007
Joffrey Lupul	200th NHL Game	January 12, 2007
Petr Nedved	700th NHL PIM	January 13, 2007
Ryan Smyth	600th NHL PIM	January 16, 2007
Jarret Stoll	200th NHL Game	January 16, 2007
Dwayne Roloson	50th NHL PIM	January 18, 2007
Zack Stortini	1st NHL Game	January 20, 2007
Marty Reasoner	200th NHL PIM	January 26, 2007
Fernando Pisani	100th NHL Point	January 31, 2007
Shawn Horcoff	400th NHL Game	February 6, 2007
Marc-Andre Bergeron	100th NHL PIM	February 15, 2007
Zack Stortini	1st NHL Goal; 1st NHL Point	February 20, 2007
Tom Gilbert	1st NHL Goal; 1st NHL Point	February 20, 2007
Ladislav Smid	1st NHL Goal	February 22, 2007
Raffi Torres	200th NHL PIM	March 1, 2007
Bryan Young	1st NHL Game	March 9, 2007
Brad Winchester	100th NHL PIM	March 12, 2007
Kyle Brodziak	1st NHL Goal; 1st NHL Point	March 17, 2007
Sebastien Bisaillon	1st NHL Game	March 19, 2007
Tom Gilbert	1st NHL Assist	March 23, 2007
Matt Greene	100th NHL Game	March 27, 2007
Dwyane Roloson	10th NHL Assist	March 27, 2007
Rob Schremp	1st NHL Game	April 5, 2007
Zack Stortini	100th NHL PIM	April 7, 2007
Danny Syvret	1st NHL Assist; 1st NHL Point	April 7, 2007

== Transactions ==
The Oilers were involved in the following transactions from June 20, 2006, the day after the deciding game of the 2006 Stanley Cup Final, through June 6, 2007, the day of the deciding game of the 2007 Stanley Cup Final.

=== Trades ===
Date	Details		Ref
June 24, 2006	To Atlanta Thrashers: 4th-round pick in 2006; 7th-round pick in 2006	To Edmonton Oilers: 3rd-round pick in 2006	
July 3, 2006	To Anaheim Ducks: Chris Pronger	To Edmonton Oilers: Joffrey Lupul; Ladislav Smid; 1st-round pick in 2007; Conditional 1st-round pick in 2008 (Note: Condition met. Edmonton received this pick when Anaheim defeated the Detroit Red Wings in the 2007 Western Conference Finals on May 22, 2007, to advance to the 2007 Stanley Cup Final.); 2nd-round pick in 2008	
July 10, 2006	To Buffalo Sabres: 7th-round pick in 2007	To Edmonton Oilers: Rights to Jan Hejda	
February 18, 2007	To New York Islanders: Marc-Andre Bergeron; 3rd-round pick in 2008	To Edmonton Oilers: Denis Grebeshkov	
February 27, 2007	To New York Islanders: Ryan Smyth	To Edmonton Oilers: Robert Nilsson; Ryan O'Marra; 1st-round pick in 2007	

=== Players acquired ===
Date	Player	Former team	Term	Via	Ref
July 4, 2006	Marty Reasoner	Boston Bruins	2-year	Free agency	
July 6, 2006	Daniel Tjarnqvist	Minnesota Wild	1-year	Free agency	
August 11, 2006	Petr Sykora	New York Rangers	1-year	Free agency	
August 28, 2006	Tim Sestito	Greenville Grrrowl (ECHL)	2-year	Free agency	
September 27, 2006	Sebastien Bisaillon	Val-d'Or Foreurs (QMJHL)	3-year	Free agency	
January 2, 2007	Petr Nedved	Philadelphia Flyers		Waivers	

=== Players lost ===
Date	Player	New team	Via (Note: In parentheses is the player's free agency group on July 1 if applicable.)	Ref
July 5, 2006	Georges Laraque	Phoenix Coyotes	Free agency (III)	
July 5, 2006	Jaroslav Spacek	Buffalo Sabres	Free agency (III)	
July 6, 2006	Ty Conklin	Columbus Blue Jackets	Free agency (III)	
July 12, 2006	Sergei Samsonov	Montreal Canadiens	Free agency (III)	
July 13, 2006	Dan Smith	Detroit Red Wings	Free agency (III)	
July 17, 2006	Nate DiCasmirro	Boston Bruins	Free agency (VI)	
July 18, 2006	Michael Peca	Toronto Maple Leafs	Free agency (III)	
August 16, 2006	Dick Tarnstrom	HC Lugano (NLA)	Free agency (III)	
August 18, 2006	Rem Murray	HIFK (Liiga)	Free agency (III)	
August 23, 2006	Kenny Smith	Charlotte Checkers (ECHL)	Free agency (UFA)	
August 30, 2006	Blake Evans	Milano Vipers (Serie A)	Free agency (VI)	
September 14, 2006	Radek Dvorak	St. Louis Blues	Free agency (III)	
October 2006	J. J. Hunter	Toronto Marlies (AHL)	Free agency (VI)	
October 8, 2006	Dan Baum	Dayton Bombers (ECHL)	Free agency (UFA)	
October 23, 2006	Jason Platt	Augusta Lynx (ECHL)	Free agency (UFA)	
October 30, 2006	Igor Ulanov	Lokomotiv Yaroslavl (RSL)	Free agency (III)	
February 8, 2007	Todd Harvey	Dundas Real McCoys (MLH)	Free agency (III)	

=== Signings ===
Date	Player	Term	Contract type	Ref
July 1, 2006	Fernando Pisani	4-year	Re-signing	
July 1, 2006	Dwayne Roloson	3-year	Re-signing	
July 12, 2006	Jan Hejda	1-year	Signing	
July 14, 2006	Shawn Horcoff	3-year	Re-signing	
July 21, 2006	Tom Gilbert	2-year	Entry-level	
July 21, 2006	Jarret Stoll	2-year	Re-signing	
July 25, 2006	Ales Hemsky	6-year	Re-signing	
August 28, 2006	Toby Petersen	1-year	Re-signing	
September 5, 2006	Alexei Mikhnov	1-year	Entry-level	
September 5, 2006	Mathieu Roy	1-year	Re-signing	
September 12, 2006	Joffrey Lupul	3-year	Re-signing	
October 6, 2006	Ethan Moreau	4-year	Extension	
November 21, 2006	Steve Staios	4-year	Extension	
January 3, 2007	Vyacheslav Trukhno	3-year	Entry-level	
May 2, 2007	Andrew Cogliano	3-year	Entry-level	
May 4, 2007	Glenn Fisher	1-year	Entry-level	
May 11, 2007	Theo Peckham	3-year	Entry-level	

== Draft picks ==
Edmonton's picks at the 2006 NHL entry draft in Vancouver. The Oilers did not draft a player until the 45th pick.

Round	#	Player	Nationality	NHL team	College/junior/club team (league)
2	45	Jeff Petry (D)	United States	Edmonton Oilers	Des Moines Buccaneers (USHL)
3	75	Theo Peckham (D)	Canada	Edmonton Oilers (from Atlanta Thrashers)	Owen Sound Attack (OHL)
5	133	Bryan Pitton (G)	Canada	Edmonton Oilers (from Florida Panthers)	Brampton Battalion (OHL)
5	140	Cody Wild (D)	United States	Edmonton Oilers	Providence College (NCAA)
6	170	Alexander Bumagin (LW)	Russia	Edmonton Oilers	Lada Togliatti (RSL)
