= 2006–07 Minnesota Wild season =

National Hockey League team season

2006–07 Minnesota Wild
- Division: 2nd Northwest
- Conference: 7th Western
- 2006–07 record: 48–26–8
- Home record: 29–7–5
- Road record: 19–19–3
- Goals for: 235
- Goals against: 191

Team information
- General manager: Doug Risebrough
- Coach: Jacques Lemaire
- Captain: Rotating; Brian Rolston (Oct.–Nov.); Keith Carney (Dec.); Brian Rolston (Jan.); Mark Parrish (Feb.–Apr.)
- Alternate captains: Rotating; Kim Johnsson (Oct.–Nov.); Brian Rolston (Dec.); Keith Carney (Jan.); Brian Rolston (Feb.–Apr.); Wes Walz
- Arena: Xcel Energy Center
- Average attendance: 18,543
- Minor league affiliates: Houston Aeros; Texas Wildcatters; Austin Ice Bats

Team leaders
- Goals: Brian Rolston (31)
- Assists: Pavol Demitra (39)
- Points: Pavol Demitra (64); Brian Rolston
- Penalty minutes: Derek Boogaard (120)
- Plus/minus: Keith Carney (+22)
- Wins: Niklas Backstrom (23)
- Goals against average: Niklas Backstrom (1.97)

This 2006–07 Minnesota Wild season began on October 5, 2006. It was the Wild's seventh season in the National Hockey League (NHL).

== Regular season ==
Excluding seven shootout goals allowed, the Wild finished the regular season with just 184 goals allowed, the fewest in the NHL.

=== Season standings ===
Here is how the Wild did in the standings in 2006–07.

Northwest Division
No.	CR		GP	W	L	OTL	GF	GA	Pts
1	3	**Vancouver Canucks**	82	49	26	7	222	201	105
2	7	**Minnesota Wild**	82	48	26	8	235	191	104
3	8	**Calgary Flames**	82	43	29	10	258	226	96
4	9	Colorado Avalanche	82	44	31	7	272	251	95
5	12	Edmonton Oilers	82	32	43	7	195	248	71

Note: CR = Conference rank; GP = Games played; W = Wins; L = Losses; T = Ties; OTL = Overtime/shootout loss; GF = Goals for; GA = Goals against; PIM = Penalties in minutes; Pts = Points
Bolded teams qualified for the playoffs.

Western Conference
R		Div	GP	W	L	OTL	GF	GA	Pts
**1**	**z-Detroit Red Wings**	**CE**	**82**	**50**	**19**	**13**	**254**	**199**	**113**
**2**	**y-Anaheim Ducks**	**PA**	**82**	**48**	**20**	**14**	**258**	**208**	**110**
**3**	**y-Vancouver Canucks**	**NW**	**82**	**49**	**26**	**7**	**222**	**201**	**105**
**4**	**Nashville Predators**	**CE**	**82**	**51**	**23**	**8**	**272**	**212**	**110**
**5**	**San Jose Sharks**	**PA**	**82**	**51**	**26**	**5**	**258**	**199**	**107**
**6**	**Dallas Stars**	**PA**	**82**	**50**	**25**	**7**	**226**	**197**	**107**
**7**	**Minnesota Wild**	**NW**	**82**	**48**	**26**	**8**	**235**	**191**	**104**
**8**	**Calgary Flames**	**NW**	**82**	**43**	**29**	**10**	**258**	**226**	**96**
8.5
9	Colorado Avalanche	NW	82	44	31	7	272	251	95
10	St. Louis Blues	CE	82	34	35	13	214	254	81
11	Columbus Blue Jackets	CE	82	33	42	7	201	249	73
12	Edmonton Oilers	NW	82	32	43	7	195	248	71
13	Chicago Blackhawks	CE	82	31	42	9	201	258	71
14	Los Angeles Kings	PA	82	27	41	14	227	283	68
15	Phoenix Coyotes	PA	82	31	46	5	216	284	67

bold - qualified for playoffs, y - division title, z - best conference record
CE - Central Division, NW - Northwest Division, PA - Pacific Division

== Playoffs ==
The Minnesota Wild ended the 2006–07 regular season as the Western Conference's seventh seed.

== Schedule and results ==
=== Regular season ===
2006–07 regular season
October: 9–2–0 (home: 7–0–0; road: 2–2–0)

Game	Date	Visitor	Score	Home	OT	Decision	Attendance	Record	Points	Recap
1	October 5	Colorado	2 – 3	Minnesota	OT	Fernandez	18,568	1–0–0	2	W
2	October 7	Nashville	5 – 6	Minnesota		Backstrom	18,568	2–0–0	4	W
3	October 10	Vancouver	1 – 2	Minnesota	SO	Fernandez	18,064	3–0–0	6	W
4	October 12	Washington	2 – 3	Minnesota	SO	Fernandez	18,064	4–0–0	8	W
5	October 14	Columbus	0 – 5	Minnesota		Fernandez	18,568	5–0–0	10	W
6	October 18	Minnesota	2 – 1	Los Angeles	OT	Fernandez	14,617	6–0–0	12	W
7	October 20	Minnesota	1 – 2	Anaheim		Fernandez	13,430	6–1–0	12	L
8	October 21	Minnesota	4 – 1	San Jose		Fernandez	17,496	7–1–0	14	W
9	October 25	Los Angeles	1 – 3	Minnesota		Fernandez	18,568	8–1–0	16	W
10	October 27	Anaheim	2 – 3	Minnesota	SO	Fernandez	18,568	9–1–0	18	W
11	October 29	Minnesota	1 – 4	Colorado		Fernandez	17,615	9–2–0	18	L

November: 4–8–1 (home: 2–2–1; road: 2–6–0)

Game	Date	Visitor	Score	Home	OT	Decision	Attendance	Record	Points	Recap
12	November 2	Vancouver	2 – 5	Minnesota		Backstrom	18,568	10–2–0	20	W
13	November 4	Nashville	4 – 3	Minnesota		Fernandez	18,568	10–3–0	20	L
14	November 7	Minnesota	1 – 3	San Jose		Fernandez	17,233	10–4–0	20	L
15	November 11	Minnesota	3 – 2	Los Angeles	SO	Fernandez	17,479	11–4–0	22	W
16	November 12	Minnesota	2 – 3	Anaheim		Backstrom	16,306	11–5–0	22	L
17	November 14	Minnesota	3 – 4	Phoenix		Fernandez	12,002	11–6–0	22	L
18	November 16	Minnesota	7 – 6	Nashville	SO	Backstrom	12,759	12–6–0	24	W
19	November 18	Colorado	2 – 1	Minnesota	SO	Backstrom	18,568	12–6–1	25	OTL
20	November 20	Minnesota	3 – 5	Ottawa		Fernandez	18,094	12–7–1	25	L
21	November 22	Minnesota	2 – 4	Montreal		Backstrom	21,273	12–8–1	25	L
22	November 24	Phoenix	0 – 4	Minnesota		Backstrom	18,568	13–8–1	27	W
23	November 25	Minnesota	3 – 5	Columbus		Fernandez	15,493	13–9–1	27	L
24	November 29	San Jose	2 – 1	Minnesota		Fernandez	18,568	13–10–1	27	L

December: 7–7–1 (home: 7–1–0; road: 0–6–1)

Game	Date	Visitor	Score	Home	OT	Decision	Attendance	Record	Points	Recap
25	December 1	Detroit	3 – 0	Minnesota		Fernandez	18,568	13–11–1	27	L
26	December 2	Minnesota	3 – 4	Dallas	SO	Backstrom	17,027	13–11–2	28	OTL
27	December 5	Chicago	2 – 3	Minnesota	SO	Fernandez	18,568	14–11–2	30	W
28	December 7	Calgary	2 – 3	Minnesota	SO	Fernandez	18,568	15–11–2	32	W
29	December 9	Chicago	4 – 5	Minnesota	OT	Fernandez	18,568	16–11–2	34	W
30	December 12	Minnesota	2 – 5	Calgary		Fernandez	19,289	16–12–2	34	L
31	December 14	Minnesota	1 – 3	Edmonton		Fernandez	16,839	16–13–2	34	L
32	December 16	Minnesota	1 – 2	Vancouver		Backstrom	18,630	16–14–2	34	L
33	December 19	Vancouver	2 – 5	Minnesota		Fernandez	18,568	17–14–2	36	W
34	December 22	Minnesota	1 – 3	Detroit		Fernandez	20,066	17–15–2	36	L
35	December 23	Detroit	2 – 3	Minnesota	OT	Fernandez	18,568	18–15–2	38	W
36	December 26	Minnesota	3 – 4	Toronto		Fernandez	19,355	18–16–2	38	L
37	December 27	Minnesota	1 – 3	Detroit		Backstrom	20,066	18–17–2	38	L
38	December 29	Columbus	3 – 4	Minnesota	OT	Fernandez	18,568	19–17–2	40	W
39	December 31	Anaheim	3 – 4	Minnesota		Fernandez	18,568	20–17–2	42	W

January: 7–4–2 (home: 2–2–2; road: 5–2–0)

Game	Date	Visitor	Score	Home	OT	Decision	Attendance	Record	Points	Recap
40	January 2	Atlanta	1 – 5	Minnesota		Fernandez	18,568	21–17–2	44	W
41	January 4	Tampa Bay	3 – 2	Minnesota		Fernandez	18,568	21–18–2	44	L
42	January 6	Colorado	2 – 1	Minnesota	SO	Fernandez	18,568	21–18–3	45	OTL
43	January 9	Minnesota	0 – 3	Calgary		Backstrom	19,289	21–19–3	45	L
44	January 11	Minnesota	5 – 2	Vancouver		Fernandez	18,630	22–19–3	47	W
45	January 12	Minnesota	4 – 2	Edmonton		Fernandez	16,839	23–19–3	49	W
46	January 14	Minnesota	4 – 3	Chicago	SO	Fernandez	11,091	24–19–3	51	W
47	January 16	Edmonton	2 – 1	Minnesota		Fernandez	18,568	24–20–3	51	L
48	January 19	Minnesota	3 – 0	Chicago		Fernandez	12,333	25–20–3	53	W
49	January 20	Dallas	2 – 1	Minnesota	SO	Backstrom	18,568	25–20–4	54	OTL
50	January 26	Calgary	1 – 2	Minnesota	SO	Backstrom	18,568	26–20–4	56	W
51	January 27	Minnesota	2 – 3	Columbus		Fernandez	18,136	26–21–4	56	L
52	January 30	Minnesota	5 – 2	St. Louis		Fernandez	10,445	27–21–4	58	W

February: 8–2–2 (home: 4–0–1; road: 4–2–1)

Game	Date	Visitor	Score	Home	OT	Decision	Attendance	Record	Points	Recap
53	February 1	Minnesota	5 – 3	Colorado		Backstrom	17,286	28–21–4	60	W
54	February 3	Minnesota	1 – 0	Phoenix		Backstrom	17,115	29–21–4	62	W
55	February 6	Minnesota	2 – 4	Dallas		Backstrom	17,660	29–22–4	62	L
56	February 8	Florida	2 – 4	Minnesota		Backstrom	18,568	30–22–4	64	W
57	February 10	Carolina	4 – 5	Minnesota		Backstrom	18,568	31–22–4	66	W
58	February 14	Vancouver	3 – 2	Minnesota	OT	Backstrom	18,568	31–22–5	67	OTL
59	February 17	Minnesota	4 – 1	Nashville		Backstrom	17,113	32–22–5	69	W
60	February 18	Minnesota	3 – 5	St. Louis		Backstrom	13,721	32–23–5	69	L
61	February 20	Dallas	1 – 2	Minnesota	SO	Backstrom	18,568	33–23–5	71	W
62	February 22	Minnesota	4 – 3	Colorado		Backstrom	18,007	34–23–5	73	W
63	February 25	Edmonton	1 – 4	Minnesota		Backstrom	18,568	35–23–5	75	W
64	February 28	Minnesota	1 – 2	Calgary	OT	Harding	19,289	35–23–6	76	OTL

March: 10–3–2 (home: 4–2–1; road: 6–1–1)

Game	Date	Visitor	Score	Home	OT	Decision	Attendance	Record	Points	Recap
65	March 1	Minnesota	5 – 0	Edmonton		Harding	16,839	36–23–6	78	W
66	March 4	Minnesota	3 – 4	Vancouver	OT	Backstrom	18,630	36–23–7	79	OTL
67	March 6	San Jose	3 – 0	Minnesota		Backstrom	18,568	36–24–7	79	L
68	March 8	Minnesota	2 – 1	Boston		Backstrom	13,709	37–24–7	81	W
69	March 9	Minnesota	5 – 1	Buffalo		Harding	18,690	38–24–7	83	W
70	March 11	Colorado	2 – 3	Minnesota	OT	Backstrom	18,568	39–24–7	85	W
71	March 13	Minnesota	3 – 2	Vancouver	OT	Backstrom	18,630	40–24–7	87	W
72	March 15	Minnesota	2 – 1	Edmonton		Backstrom	16,839	41–24–7	89	W
73	March 17	Minnesota	4 – 2	Calgary		Backstrom	19,289	42–24–7	91	W
74	March 20	Phoenix	2 – 3	Minnesota		Backstrom	18,568	43–24–7	93	W
75	March 22	St. Louis	1 – 5	Minnesota		Backstrom	18,568	44–24–7	95	W
76	March 24	Los Angeles	1 – 4	Minnesota		Harding	18,568	45–24–7	97	W
77	March 27	Calgary	1 – 0	Minnesota	SO	Backstrom	18,568	45–24–8	98	OTL
78	March 29	Calgary	4 – 2	Minnesota		Harding	18,568	45–25–8	98	L
79	March 31	Minnesota	1 – 2	Colorado		Harding	17,192	45–26–8	98	L

April: 3–0–0 (home: 3–0–0; road: 0–0–0)

Game	Date	Visitor	Score	Home	OT	Decision	Attendance	Record	Points	Recap
80	April 3	Edmonton	0 – 3	Minnesota		Backstrom	18,568	46–26–8	100	W
81	April 5	Edmonton	0 – 3	Minnesota		Backstrom	18,568	47–26–8	102	W
82	April 7	St. Louis	1 – 5	Minnesota		Backstrom	18,568	48–26–8	104	W

Legend: W Win (2 points) L Loss (0 points) OTL Overtime/shootout loss (1 point)

=== Playoffs ===
2007 Stanley Cup playoffs
Western Conference quarterfinals vs. (2) Anaheim Ducks – Ducks win 4–1

Game	Date	Visitor	Score	Home	OT	Decision	Attendance	Series	Recap
1	April 11	Minnesota	1 – 2	Anaheim		Backstrom	17,180	0 – 1	L
2	April 13	Minnesota	2 – 3	Anaheim		Backstrom	17,324	0 – 2	L
3	April 15	Anaheim	2 – 1	Minnesota		Backstrom	19,224	0 – 3	L
4	April 17	Anaheim	1 – 4	Minnesota		Backstrom	19,174	1 – 3	W
5	April 19	Minnesota	1 – 4	Anaheim		Backstrom	17,318	1 – 4	L

Legend: W Win L Loss

== Player statistics ==
=== Scoring ===
- Position abbreviations: C = Center; D = Defense; G = Goaltender; LW = Left wing; RW = Right wing
- † = Joined team via a transaction (e.g., trade, waivers, signing) during the season. Stats reflect time with the Wild only.
- ‡ = Left team via a transaction (e.g., trade, waivers, release) during the season. Stats reflect time with the Wild only.

No.	Player	Pos	Regular season						Playoffs					
No.	Player	Pos	GP	G	A	Pts	+/-	PIM	GP	G	A	Pts	+/-	PIM
12	Brian Rolston	RW	78	31	33	64	6	46	5	1	1	2	−2	4
38	Pavol Demitra	LW	71	25	39	64	0	28	5	1	3	4	−1	0
10	Marian Gaborik	RW	48	30	27	57	12	40	5	3	1	4	3	8
96	Pierre-Marc Bouchard	C	82	20	37	57	13	14	5	1	1	2	−3	0
9	Mikko Koivu	C	82	20	34	54	6	58	5	1	0	1	−1	4
28	Todd White	C	77	13	31	44	8	24	4	0	0	0	−1	0
21	Mark Parrish	RW	76	19	20	39	9	18	5	1	0	1	2	0
8	Brent Burns	D	77	7	18	25	16	26	5	0	1	1	1	14
92	Branko Radivojevic	RW	82	11	13	24	−9	21	5	0	0	0	−1	2
37	Wes Walz	C	62	9	15	24	3	30	5	0	1	1	1	4
26	Kurtis Foster	D	57	3	20	23	−3	52	3	0	2	2	0	0
5	Kim Johnsson	D	76	3	19	22	−4	64	4	0	0	0	−1	2
33	Petteri Nummelin	D	51	3	17	20	−15	22	3	1	1	2	1	0
19	Stephane Veilleux	LW	75	7	11	18	3	47	5	0	0	0	0	4
3	Keith Carney	D	80	4	13	17	22	58	5	0	0	0	1	4
41	Martin Skoula	D	81	0	15	15	9	36	5	0	0	0	2	4
11	Pascal Dupuis‡	LW	48	10	3	13	−7	38	—	—	—	—	—	—
55	Nick Schultz	D	82	2	10	12	0	42	5	0	1	1	−3	0
17	Wyatt Smith	C	61	3	3	6	−8	16	4	0	0	0	0	0
18	Adam Hall†	RW	23	2	3	5	2	8	3	0	0	0	0	7
11 (Note: Moore wore number 22 in his first game.)	Dominic Moore†	C	10	2	0	2	3	10	—	—	—	—	—	—
18	Mattias Weinhandl	RW	12	1	1	2	−2	10	—	—	—	—	—	—
32	Niklas Backstrom	G	41	0	1	1		2	5	0	1	1		2
4	Shawn Belle	D	9	0	1	1	4	0	—	—	—	—	—	—
24	Derek Boogaard	LW	48	0	1	1	0	120	4	0	1	1	0	20
27	Joel Ward	RW	11	0	1	1	0	0	—	—	—	—	—	—
35	Manny Fernandez	G	44	0	0	0		12	—	—	—	—	—	—
83	Matt Foy	RW	9	0	0	0	−1	4	—	—	—	—	—	—
29	Josh Harding	G	7	0	0	0		0	—	—	—	—	—	—
23	Jason Morgan	C	4	0	0	0	−1	4	—	—	—	—	—	—
67	Benoit Pouliot	LW	3	0	0	0	−1	0	—	—	—	—	—	—
6	Erik Reitz	D	1	0	0	0	1	0	—	—	—	—	—	—

=== Goaltending ===
No.	Player	Regular season										Playoffs								
No.	Player	GP	W	L	OT	SA	GA	GAA	SV%	SO	TOI	GP	W	L	SA	GA	GAA	SV%	SO	TOI
32	Niklas Backstrom	41	23	8	6	1028	73	1.97	.929	5	2227	5	1	4	145	11	2.22	.924	0	297
35	Manny Fernandez	44	22	16	1	1158	103	2.55	.911	2	2422	—	—	—	—	—	—	—	—	—
29	Josh Harding	7	3	2	1	174	7	1.16	.960	1	361	—	—	—	—	—	—	—	—	—

== Awards and records ==
=== Awards ===
Type	Award/honor	Recipient	Ref
League (annual)	Roger Crozier Saving Grace Award	Niklas Backstrom	
League (annual)	William M. Jennings Trophy	Niklas Backstrom	
League (annual)	William M. Jennings Trophy	Manny Fernandez	
League (in-season)	NHL All-Star Game selection	Brian Rolston	
League (in-season)	NHL First Star of the Week	Niklas Backstrom (February 25)	
League (in-season)	NHL Third Star of the Week	Niklas Backstrom (April 8)	

=== Milestones ===
Milestone	Player	Date	Ref
First game	Niklas Backstrom	October 7, 2006	
First game	Benoit Pouliot	November 22, 2006	
First game	Shawn Belle	December 1, 2006	
First game	Joel Ward	December 16, 2006	

== Transactions ==
The Wild were involved in the following transactions from June 20, 2006, the day after the deciding game of the 2006 Stanley Cup Finals, through June 6, 2007, the day of the deciding game of the 2007 Stanley Cup Finals.

=== Trades ===
Date	Details		Ref
June 24, 2006	To Minnesota Wild: Pavol Demitra	To Los Angeles Kings: Patrick O'Sullivan; 1st-round pick in 2006	
February 9, 2007	To Minnesota Wild: Adam Hall	To New York Rangers: Pascal Dupuis	
February 27, 2007	To Minnesota Wild: Dominic Moore	To Pittsburgh Penguins: 3rd-round pick in 2007	
February 28, 2007	To Minnesota Wild: Aaron Voros	To New Jersey Devils: 7th-round pick in 2008	

=== Players acquired ===
Date	Player	Former team	Term	Via	Ref
July 1, 2006	Keith Carney	Vancouver Canucks	multi-year	Free agency	
July 1, 2006	Kim Johnsson	Philadelphia Flyers	multi-year	Free agency	
July 1, 2006	Mark Parrish	Los Angeles Kings	5-year	Free agency	
July 5, 2006	Paul Albers	Vancouver Giants (WHL)		Free agency	
July 5, 2006	Ryan Hamilton	Houston Aeros (AHL)		Free agency	
July 5, 2006	Mike Madill	St. Lawrence University (ECAC)		Free agency	
July 6, 2006	Branko Radiovjevic	Philadelphia Flyers		Free agency	
July 17, 2006	Jason Morgan	Chicago Blackhawks	1-year	Free agency	
July 19, 2006	Wyatt Smith	New York Islanders	1-year	Free agency	
September 27, 2006	Joel Ward	Houston Aeros (AHL)		Free agency	
December 31, 2006	John Scott	Houston Aeros (AHL)		Free agency	

=== Players lost ===
Date	Player	New team	Via (Note: In parentheses is the player's free agency group on July 1 if applicable.)	Ref
June 21, 2006	Joey Tetarenko	Houston Aeros (AHL)	Free agency (VI)	
July 1, 2006	Filip Kuba	Tampa Bay Lightning	Free agency (III)	
July 1, 2006	Andrei Zyuzin	Calgary Flames	Free agency (III)	
July 4, 2006	Randy Robitaille	Philadelphia Flyers	Free agency (III)	
July 6, 2006	Daniel Tjarnqvist	Edmonton Oilers	Free agency (III)	
July 13, 2006	Erik Westrum	Toronto Maple Leafs	Free agency (VI)	
July 14, 2006	Scott Ferguson	San Jose Sharks	Free agency (III)	
July 14, 2006	Andrei Nazarov		Retirement (III)	
July 18, 2006	Kyle Wanvig	Atlanta Thrashers	Free agency (VI)	
July 20, 2006	Marc Chouinard	Vancouver Canucks	Free agency (III)	
July 23, 2006	Rickard Wallin	HC Lugano (NLA)	Free agency (VI)	
August 9, 2006	Chris Heid	Eisbaren Berlin (DEL)	Free agency (UFA)	
August 21, 2006	Alex Henry	Nashville Predators	Free agency (UFA)	
October 3, 2006	Dustin Wood	Manitoba Moose (AHL)	Free agency (UFA)	

=== Signings ===
Date	Player	Term	Contract type	Ref
June 21, 2006	Kurtis Foster	1-year	Re-signing	
June 24, 2006	Pierre-Marc Bouchard	1-year	Re-signing	
July 5, 2006	Marian Gaborik	3-year	Re-signing	
July 6, 2006	Derek Boogaard		Re-signing	
July 7, 2006	Riley Emmerson		Entry-level	
July 10, 2006	Brent Burns	2-year	Re-signing	
July 13, 2006	Pascal Dupuis	1-year	Re-signing	
July 14, 2006	Matt Foy	1-year	Re-signing	
July 14, 2006	Erik Reitz	1-year	Re-signing	
July 18, 2006	Mikko Koivu	1-year	Re-signing	
May 14, 2007	Matt Kassian	3-year	Entry-level	
May 15, 2007	Morten Madsen	3-year	Entry-level	
May 26, 2007	Cal Clutterbuck	3-year	Entry-level	

== Draft picks ==
Minnesota's picks at the 2006 NHL entry draft in Vancouver, British Columbia. The Wild had the ninth overall pick in the draft. They also had the Edmonton Oilers first round pick, 17th overall, which they used to trade for Pavol Demitra from the Los Angeles Kings on draft day.

Round	#	Player	Nationality	College/junior/club team (league)
1	9	James Sheppard (C/LW)	Canada	Cape Breton Screaming Eagles (QMJHL)
2	40	Ondrej Fiala (C)	Czech Republic	Everett Silvertips (WHL)
3	72	Cal Clutterbuck (RW)	Canada	Oshawa Generals (OHL)
4	102	Kyle Medvec (D)	United States	Apple Valley High School (USHS-MN)
5	132	Niko Hovinen (G)	Finland	Jokerit (SM-liiga)
6	162	Julian Walker (W)	Switzerland	EHC Basel (NLA)
7	192	Chris Hickey (C)	United States	Cretin-Derham Hall (USHS-MN)

== See also ==
- 2006–07 NHL season
