= 2006–07 Dallas Stars season =

National Hockey League team season

2006–07 Dallas Stars
- Division: 3rd Pacific
- Conference: 6th Western
- 2006–07 record: 50–25–7
- Home record: 28–11–2
- Road record: 22–14–5
- Goals for: 226
- Goals against: 197

Team information
- General manager: Doug Armstrong
- Coach: Dave Tippett
- Captain: Brenden Morrow
- Alternate captains: Mike Modano; Sergei Zubov
- Arena: American Airlines Center
- Average attendance: 17,914
- Minor league affiliates: Iowa Stars; Idaho Steelheads

Team leaders
- Goals: Jere Lehtinen (26)
- Assists: Mike Ribeiro (41)
- Points: Mike Ribeiro (59)
- Penalty minutes: Matthew Barnaby (127)
- Plus/minus: Mike Modano (+9)
- Wins: Marty Turco (37)
- Goals against average: Mike Smith (2.23); Mary Turco (2.23)

The 2006–07 Dallas Stars season was the 14th season for the Dallas Stars, and the 40th overall of the franchise. The Stars made one major acquisition, Eric Lindros. With Marty Turco still in goal, and Mike Modano and captain Brenden Morrow leading the team, the Stars qualified for the playoffs for the fourth consecutive season.

== Off-season ==
Brenden Morrow was named team captain on September 29.

== Regular season ==
The Stars tied the Toronto Maple Leafs for the fewest shorthanded goals scored during the regular season, with three.

=== Season standings ===
Pacific Division
No.	CR		GP	W	L	OTL	GF	GA	Pts
1	2	**Anaheim Ducks**	82	48	20	14	258	208	110
2	5	**San Jose Sharks**	82	51	26	5	258	199	107
3	6	**Dallas Stars**	82	50	25	7	226	197	107
4	14	Los Angeles Kings	82	27	41	14	227	283	68
5	15	Phoenix Coyotes	82	31	46	5	216	284	67

Note: CR = Conference rank; GP = Games played; W = Wins; L = Losses; T = Ties; OTL = Overtime/shootout loss; GF = Goals for; GA = Goals against; PIM = Penalties in minutes; Pts = Points
Bolded teams qualified for the playoffs.

Western Conference
R		Div	GP	W	L	OTL	GF	GA	Pts
**1**	**z-Detroit Red Wings**	**CE**	**82**	**50**	**19**	**13**	**254**	**199**	**113**
**2**	**y-Anaheim Ducks**	**PA**	**82**	**48**	**20**	**14**	**258**	**208**	**110**
**3**	**y-Vancouver Canucks**	**NW**	**82**	**49**	**26**	**7**	**222**	**201**	**105**
**4**	**Nashville Predators**	**CE**	**82**	**51**	**23**	**8**	**272**	**212**	**110**
**5**	**San Jose Sharks**	**PA**	**82**	**51**	**26**	**5**	**258**	**199**	**107**
**6**	**Dallas Stars**	**PA**	**82**	**50**	**25**	**7**	**226**	**197**	**107**
**7**	**Minnesota Wild**	**NW**	**82**	**48**	**26**	**8**	**235**	**191**	**104**
**8**	**Calgary Flames**	**NW**	**82**	**43**	**29**	**10**	**258**	**226**	**96**
8.5
9	Colorado Avalanche	NW	82	44	31	7	272	251	95
10	St. Louis Blues	CE	82	34	35	13	214	254	81
11	Columbus Blue Jackets	CE	82	33	42	7	201	249	73
12	Edmonton Oilers	NW	82	32	43	7	195	248	71
13	Chicago Blackhawks	CE	82	31	42	9	201	258	71
14	Los Angeles Kings	PA	82	27	41	14	227	283	68
15	Phoenix Coyotes	PA	82	31	46	5	216	284	67

bold - qualified for playoffs, y - division title, z - best conference record
CE - Central Division, NW - Northwest Division, PA - Pacific Division

== Playoffs ==
The Dallas Stars ended the 2006–07 regular season as the Western Conference's sixth seed.

== Schedule and results ==
=== Regular season ===
2006–07 regular season
October: 9–2–0 (home: 4–1–0; road: 5–1–0)

Game	Date	Visitor	Score	Home	OT	Decision	Attendance	Record	Points	Recap
1	October 4	Dallas	3 – 2	Colorado	OT	Turco	18,007	1–0–0	2	W
2	October 7	New Jersey	1 – 3	Dallas		Turco	18,532	2–0–0	4	W
3	October 12	Dallas	4 – 1	Los Angeles		Turco	14,167	3–0–0	6	W
4	October 14	Dallas	4 – 1	Los Angeles		Turco	17,052	4–0–0	8	W
5	October 15	Dallas	4 – 3	Anaheim	SO	Turco	15,269	5–0–0	10	W
6	October 17	Dallas	0 – 2	San Jose		Turco	16,380	5–1–0	10	L
7	October 20	Chicago	4 – 5	Dallas		Turco	18,198	6–1–0	12	W
8	October 21	Dallas	4 – 0	Phoenix		Smith	14,269	7–1–0	14	W
9	October 23	Vancouver	1 – 2	Dallas		Turco	16,639	8–1–0	16	W
10	October 27	Detroit	4 – 3	Dallas		Turco	18,584	8–2–0	16	L
11	October 28	Los Angeles	2 – 3	Dallas		Smith	17,711	9–2–0	18	W

November: 7–7–0 (home: 4–1–0; road: 3–6–0)

Game	Date	Visitor	Score	Home	OT	Decision	Attendance	Record	Points	Recap
12	November 1	St. Louis	1 – 4	Dallas		Turco	17,634	10–2–0	20	W
13	November 3	Dallas	3 – 2	Edmonton		Turco	16,839	11–2–0	22	W
14	November 6	Dallas	1 – 2	Vancouver		Smith	18,630	11–3–0	22	L
15	November 7	Dallas	1 – 3	Calgary		Turco	19,289	11–4–0	22	L
16	November 9	Dallas	1 – 0	Phoenix		Turco	13,197	12–4–0	24	W
17	November 15	NY Islanders	3 – 0	Dallas		Turco	17,643	12–5–0	24	L
18	November 17	Dallas	5 – 3	Atlanta		Turco	18,545	13–5–0	26	W
19	November 18	Dallas	4 – 5	Carolina		Turco	18,639	13–6–0	26	L
20	November 20	Colorado	4 – 5	Dallas		Smith	17,491	14–6–0	28	W
21	November 22	Nashville	0 – 1	Dallas		Smith	17,853	15–6–0	30	W
22	November 24	Los Angeles	3 – 5	Dallas		Smith	18,532	16–6–0	32	W
23	November 27	Dallas	1 – 2	Detroit		Turco	20,066	16–7–0	32	L
24	November 29	Dallas	1 – 2	Chicago		Turco	13,164	16–8–0	32	L
25	November 30	Dallas	3 – 4	Washington		Smith	10,912	16–9–0	32	L

December: 9–6–0 (home: 5–4–0; road: 4–2–0)

Game	Date	Visitor	Score	Home	OT	Decision	Attendance	Record	Points	Recap
26	December 2	Minnesota	3 – 4	Dallas	SO	Turco	17,027	17–9–0	34	W
27	December 4	San Jose	0 – 1	Dallas		Turco	17,056	18–9–0	36	W
28	December 6	Phoenix	0 – 3	Dallas		Turco	16,927	19–9–0	38	W
29	December 8	Edmonton	2 – 0	Dallas		Turco	17,182	19–10–0	38	L
30	December 9	Dallas	4 – 3	Phoenix	OT	Turco	15,320	20–10–0	40	W
31	December 12	Columbus	3 – 1	Dallas		Turco	17,411	20–11–0	40	L
32	December 14	NY Rangers	5 – 2	Dallas		Smith	17,788	20–12–0	40	L
33	December 16	Dallas	4 – 3	Los Angeles	SO	Turco	15,846	21–12–0	42	W
34	December 20	Dallas	1 – 4	Anaheim		Turco	17,174	21–13–0	42	L
35	December 21	Dallas	3 – 0	San Jose		Turco	17,496	22–13–0	44	W
36	December 23	Edmonton	2 – 3	Dallas		Turco	18,136	23–13–0	46	W
37	December 26	Dallas	1 – 2	Chicago		Turco	14,278	23–14–0	46	L
38	December 27	Dallas	5 – 4	Colorado		Turco	18,007	24–14–0	48	W
39	December 29	Nashville	1 – 4	Dallas		Turco	18,532	25–14–0	50	W
40	December 31	San Jose	4 – 2	Dallas		Turco	18,584	25–15–0	50	L

January: 5–4–2 (home: 2–2–1; road: 3–2–1)

Game	Date	Visitor	Score	Home	OT	Decision	Attendance	Record	Points	Recap
41	January 3	Dallas	1 – 2	Vancouver	SO	Turco	18,630	25–15–1	51	OTL
42	January 4	Dallas	6 – 5	Edmonton	SO	Turco	16,839	26–15–1	53	W
43	January 6	Dallas	2 – 4	Calgary		Turco	19,289	26–16–1	53	L
44	January 9	Phoenix	5 – 2	Dallas		Turco	18,532	26–17–1	53	L
45	January 11	Anaheim	5 – 1	Dallas		Turco	18,532	26–18–1	53	L
46	January 15	Los Angeles	1 – 3	Dallas		Turco	17,992	27–18–1	55	W
47	January 17	Calgary	2 – 4	Dallas		Turco	18,532	28–18–1	57	W
48	January 20	Dallas	2 – 1	Minnesota	SO	Turco	18,568	29–18–1	59	W
49	January 26	Pittsburgh	4 – 3	Dallas	SO	Turco	18,594	29–18–2	60	OTL
50	January 28	Dallas	1 – 4	Anaheim		Turco	17,331	29–19–2	60	L
51	January 30	Dallas	3 – 2	San Jose	SO	Turco	17,496	30–19–2	62	W

February: 9–2–0 (home: 6–1–0; road: 3–1–0)

Game	Date	Visitor	Score	Home	OT	Decision	Attendance	Record	Points	Recap
52	February 1	Dallas	4 – 2	San Jose		Turco	17,496	31–19–2	64	W
53	February 3	Dallas	0 – 2	St. Louis		Turco	16,627	31–20–2	64	L
54	February 6	Minnesota	2 – 4	Dallas		Smith	17,660	32–20–2	66	W
55	February 10	Anaheim	0 – 1	Dallas		Smith	17,793	33–20–2	68	W
56	February 11	Colorado	5 – 7	Dallas		Smith	17,506	34–20–2	70	W
57	February 14	Detroit	3 – 1	Dallas		Smith	18,037	34–21–2	70	L
58	February 18	San Jose	2 – 5	Dallas		Turco	17,849	35–21–2	72	W
59	February 20	Dallas	1 – 2	Minnesota	SO	Turco	18,568	35–21–3	73	W
60	February 23	Anaheim	1 – 4	Dallas		Smith	17,634	36–21–3	75	W
61	February 25	Vancouver	1 – 2	Dallas	OT	Turco	17,712	37–21–3	77	W
62	February 27	Dallas	2 – 1	Tampa Bay	OT	Turco	19,225	38–21–3	79	W

March: 11–2–3 (home: 5–1–1; road: 6–1–2)

Game	Date	Visitor	Score	Home	OT	Decision	Attendance	Record	Points	Recap
63	March 1	Dallas	1 – 2	Florida	OT	Smith	11,822	38–21–4	80	OTL
64	March 2	Columbus	3 – 2	Dallas	SO	Turco	17,147	38–21–5	81	OTL
65	March 4	San Jose	4 – 0	Dallas		Turco	18,002	38–22–5	81	L
66	March 8	Dallas	4 – 0	St. Louis		Smith	11,131	38–23–5	81	W
67	March 9	Dallas	3 – 0	Columbus		Turco	17,284	39–23–5	83	W
68	March 11	Los Angeles	3 – 4	Dallas	OT	Turco	17,478	40–23–5	85	W
69	March 13	Philadelphia	2 – 3	Dallas		Smith	17,618	41–23–5	87	W
70	March 15	Calgary	2 – 4	Dallas		Turco	18,532	42–23–5	89	W
71	March 17	Dallas	2 – 3	Nashville		Turco	17,113	42–24–5	89	L
72	March 18	Phoenix	4 – 5	Dallas	OT	Turco	18,318	43–24–5	91	W
73	March 21	Dallas	4 – 2	Los Angeles		Smith	17,838	44–24–5	93	W
74	March 23	Dallas	2 – 3	Anaheim	OT	Turco	17,421	44–24–6	94	OTL
75	March 24	Dallas	4 – 3	Phoenix	SO	Turco	17,522	45–24–6	96	W
76	March 27	Phoenix	0 – 6	Dallas		Turco	18,532	46–24–6	98	W
77	March 30	Dallas	4 – 3	Detroit	SO	Smith	20,066	47–24–6	100	W
78	March 31	Dallas	4 – 2	Nashville		Turco	17,113	48–24–6	102	W

April: 2–1–1 (home: 2–1–0; road: 0–0–1)

Game	Date	Visitor	Score	Home	OT	Decision	Attendance	Record	Points	Recap
79	April 2	St. Louis	4 – 2	Dallas		Turco	18,532	48–25–6	102	L
80	April 5	Dallas	1 – 2	Columbus	OT	Turco	15,997	48–25–7	103	OTL
81	April 6	Anaheim	1 – 2	Dallas	SO	Turco	18,584	49–25–7	105	W
82	April 8	Chicago	2 – 3	Dallas		Turco	17,932	50–25–7	107	W

Legend: W Win (2 points) L Loss (0 points) OTL Overtime/shootout loss (1 point)

=== Playoffs ===
2007 Stanley Cup playoffs
Western Conference Quarterfinals vs. (3) Vancouver Canucks – Canucks win 4–3

Game	Date	Visitor	Score	Home	OT	Decision	Attendance	Series	Recap
1	April 11	Dallas	4 – 5	Vancouver	4OT	Turco	18,630	0 – 1	L
2	April 13	Dallas	2 – 0	Vancouver		Turco	18,630	1 – 1	W
3	April 15	Vancouver	2 – 1	Dallas	OT	Turco	18,532	1 – 2	L
4	April 17	Vancouver	2 – 1	Dallas		Turco	18,532	1 – 3	L
5	April 19	Dallas	1 – 0	Vancouver	OT	Turco	18,630	2 – 3	W
6	April 21	Vancouver	0 – 2	Dallas		Turco	18,600	3 – 3	W
7	April 23	Dallas	1 – 4	Vancouver		Turco	18,630	3 – 4	L

Legend: W Win L Loss

== Player statistics ==
=== Scoring ===
- Position abbreviations: C = Center; D = Defense; G = Goaltender; LW = Left wing; RW = Right wing
- † = Joined team via a transaction (e.g., trade, waivers, signing) during the season. Stats reflect time with the Stars only.
- ‡ = Left team via a transaction (e.g., trade, waivers, release) during the season. Stats reflect time with the Stars only.

No.	Player	Pos	Regular season						Playoffs					
No.	Player	Pos	GP	G	A	Pts	+/-	PIM	GP	G	A	Pts	+/-	PIM
63	Mike Ribeiro	C	81	18	41	59	3	22	7	0	3	3	−3	4
56	Sergei Zubov	D	78	12	42	54	0	26	6	0	4	4	3	2
43	Philippe Boucher	D	76	19	32	51	2	104	7	0	1	1	−5	6
36	Jussi Jokinen	C	82	14	34	48	8	18	4	0	1	1	−1	0
26	Jere Lehtinen	RW	73	26	17	43	5	16	7	0	0	0	−2	2
9	Mike Modano	C	59	22	21	43	9	34	7	1	1	2	0	4
10	Brenden Morrow	LW	40	16	15	31	−2	33	7	2	1	3	−1	18
15	Niklas Hagman	LW	82	17	12	29	3	34	7	0	1	1	−1	10
88	Eric Lindros	C	49	5	21	26	−1	70	3	0	0	0	−2	4
14	Stu Barnes	C	82	13	12	25	−2	40	7	1	3	4	1	4
20	Antti Miettinen	RW	74	11	14	25	−5	38	4	1	1	2	0	2
11	Jeff Halpern	C	76	8	17	25	−7	78	7	2	1	3	−1	4
5	Darryl Sydor	D	74	5	16	21	−4	36	7	1	1	2	2	4
21	Loui Eriksson	LW	59	6	13	19	−3	18	4	0	1	1	0	0
3	Stephane Robidas	D	75	0	17	17	−1	86	7	0	1	1	−1	2
17	Ladislav Nagy†	LW	25	4	10	14	−3	6	7	1	1	2	1	2
6	Trevor Daley	D	74	4	8	12	2	63	7	1	0	1	−3	4
27	Patrik Stefan	C	41	5	6	11	5	10	—	—	—	—	—	—
44	Jaroslav Modry‡	D	57	1	9	10	10	32	—	—	—	—	—	—
77	Matthew Barnaby	RW	39	1	6	7	5	127	—	—	—	—	—	—
39	Joel Lundqvist	C	36	3	3	6	−5	14	7	2	0	2	1	6
50	Krys Barch	RW	26	3	2	5	2	107	—	—	—	—	—	—
17	Mathias Tjarnqvist‡	RW	18	1	3	4	−3	4	—	—	—	—	—	—
29	Steve Ott	C	19	0	4	4	−4	35	6	0	0	0	0	8
35	Marty Turco	G	67	0	4	4		18	7	0	0	0		4
65	Chris Conner	W	11	1	2	3	−3	4	—	—	—	—	—	—
42	Jon Klemm	D	38	1	2	3	0	24	1	0	0	0	0	2
25	Nolan Baumgartner†	D	7	0	2	2	0	0	—	—	—	—	—	—
4	Mattias Norstrom†	D	14	0	2	2	2	8	7	0	0	0	0	8
22	Junior Lessard	RW	1	1	0	1	1	0	—	—	—	—	—	—
2	Nicklas Grossmann	D	8	0	0	0	−1	4	—	—	—	—	—	—
24	Vojtech Polak	LW	2	0	0	0	−1	0	—	—	—	—	—	—
41	Mike Smith	G	23	0	0	0		2	—	—	—	—	—	—

=== Goaltending ===
No.	Player	Regular season										Playoffs								
No.	Player	GP	W	L	OT	SA	GA	GAA	SV%	SO	TOI	GP	W	L	SA	GA	GAA	SV%	SO	TOI
35	Marty Turco	67	38	20	5	1564	140	2.23	.910	6	3764	7	3	4	229	11	1.30	.952	3	509
41	Mike Smith	23	12	5	2	511	45	2.23	.912	3	1213	–	–	–	–	–	–	–	–	–

== Awards and records ==
=== Awards ===
Type	Award/honor	Recipient	Ref
League (annual)	NHL All-Rookie Team	Mike Smith (Goaltender)	
League (in-season)	NHL All-Star Game selection	Philippe Boucher	
League (in-season)	NHL All-Star Game selection	Marty Turco	
League (in-season)	NHL First Star of the Week	Marty Turco (October 15)	
League (in-season)	NHL Second Star of the Week	Marty Turco (January 21)	
League (in-season)	NHL Third Star of the Week	Mike Smith (November 26)	
League (in-season)	NHL Third Star of the Week	Mike Smith (February 11)	
League (in-season)	NHL Third Star of the Week	Mike Modano (March 18)	
League (in-season)	NHL YoungStars Game selection	Jussi Jokinen	
Team	Star of the Game Award	Mike Modano	

=== Milestones ===
Milestone	Player	Date	Ref
First game	Loui Eriksson	October 4, 2006	
First game	Mike Smith	October 21, 2006	
First game	Nicklas Grossmann	December 2, 2006	
First game	Joel Lundqvist	December 4, 2006	
First game	Chris Conner	December 8, 2006	
First game	Krys Barch	January 15, 2007	
25th shutout	Marty Turco	November 9, 2006	
1,000th game played	Stu Barnes	November 30, 2006	
1,000th game played	Sergei Zubov	March 15, 2007	

== Transactions ==
The Stars were involved in the following transactions from June 20, 2006, the day after the deciding game of the 2006 Stanley Cup Finals, through June 6, 2007, the day of the deciding game of the 2007 Stanley Cup Finals.

=== Trades ===
Date	Details		Ref
June 24, 2006	To Atlanta Thrashers: Niko Kapanen; 7th-round pick in the 2006	To Dallas Stars: Jaroslav Modry; Patrik Stefan	
July 1, 2006	To Tampa Bay Lightning: 4th-round pick in 2008	To Dallas Stars: Darryl Sydor	
September 30, 2006	To Montreal Canadiens: Janne Niinimaa; 5th-round pick in the 2007	To Dallas Stars: Mike Ribeiro; 6th-round pick in the 2008	
February 12, 2007	To Phoenix Coyotes: Mathias Tjarnqvist; 1st-round pick in the 2007	To Dallas Stars: Ladislav Nagy	
February 23, 2007	To Anaheim Ducks: Future considerations	To Dallas Stars: Shane Endicott	
February 27, 2007	To Los Angeles Kings: Jaroslav Modry; Rights to Johan Fransson; 1st-round pick in the 2008; 2nd-round pick in the 2007; 3rd-round pick in the 2007	To Dallas Stars: Mattias Norstrom; Konstantin Pushkarev; 3rd-round pick in the 2007; 4th-round pick in the 2007	

=== Players acquired ===
Date	Player	Former team	Term	Via	Ref
July 5, 2006	Matthew Barnaby	Chicago Blackhawks	1-year	Free agency	
July 5, 2006	Jeff Halpern	Washington Capitals	4-year	Free agency	
July 10, 2006	Marty Sertich	Colorado College (WCHA)	2-year	Free agency	
July 13, 2006	Chris Conner	Michigan Tech (WCHA)	2-year	Free agency	
July 17, 2006	Eric Lindros	Toronto Maple Leafs	1-year	Free agency	
July 18, 2006	Krys Barch	Iowa Stars (AHL)	1-year	Free agency	
February 2, 2007	Aaron Gagnon	Seattle Thunderbirds (WHL)	3-year	Free agency	
February 24, 2007	Nolan Baumgartner	Philadelphia Flyers		Waivers	

=== Players lost ===
Date	Player	New team	Via (Note: In parentheses is the player's free agency group on July 1 if applicable.)	Ref
June 30, 2006	Bill Guerin	St. Louis Blues (Note: Guerin signed with St. Louis on July 3.)	Buyout	
July 1, 2006	Johan Hedberg	Atlanta Thrashers	Free agency (III)	
July 1, 2006	Willie Mitchell	Vancouver Canucks	Free agency (III)	
July 2, 2006	Jason Arnott	Nashville Predators	Free agency (III)	
July 10, 2006	Patrick Traverse	San Jose Sharks	Free agency (III)	
July 13, 2006	Dan Jancevski	Montreal Canadiens	Free agency (VI)	
July 31, 2006	David Oliver	Rogle BK (Allsvenskan)	Free agency (III)	
September 6, 2006	Jaroslav Svoboda	HC Znojemsti Orli (ELH)	Free agency (UFA)	
October 10, 2006	Mike Siklenka	Leksands IF (Allsvenskan)	Free agency (VI)	
October 15, 2006	Nathan Perrott	Toronto Marlies (AHL)	Free agency (III)	
October 17, 2006	Jeremy Stevenson	Amarillo Gorillas (CHL)	Free agency (III)	
October 26, 2006	David Bararuk	Ilves (Liiga)	Free agency (UFA)	
December 11, 2006	Garrett Burnett	St-Jean Chiefs (LNAH)	Free agency (III)	

=== Signings ===
Date	Player	Term	Contract type	Ref
June 28, 2006	Jon Klemm	1-year	Option exercised	
June 28, 2006	Mathias Tjarnqvist	2-year	Re-signing	
July 2, 2006	Mike Smith	1-year	Re-signing	
July 10, 2006	Steve Ott	2-year	Re-signing	
July 12, 2006	Vadim Khomitsky	1-year	Entry-level	
July 14, 2006	Junior Lessard	1-year	Re-signing	
July 18, 2006	Dan Ellis	1-year	Re-signing	
August 31, 2006	Trevor Daley	2-year	Re-signing	
September 16, 2006	Jere Lehtinen	2-year	Extension	
September 21, 2006	Brenden Morrow	6-year	Extension	
October 20, 2006	James Neal	3-year	Entry-level	
December 6, 2006	Stephane Robidas	3-year	Extension	
February 7, 2007	Mike Smith	2-year	Extension	
March 19, 2007	Matt Niskanen	3-year	Entry-level	
March 26, 2007	Richard Clune	3-year	Entry-level	
May 1, 2007	Krys Barch	1-year	Extension	
May 15, 2007	Tom Wandell	3-year	Entry-level	

== Draft picks ==
Dallas' picks at the 2006 NHL entry draft in Vancouver, British Columbia.

Round	#	Player	Nationality	NHL team	College/Junior/Club team (League)
1	27	Ivan Vishnevskiy (D)	Russia	Dallas Stars	Rouyn-Noranda Huskies (QMJHL)
3	90	Aaron Snow (LW)	Canada	Dallas Stars	Brampton Battalion (OHL)
4	120	Richard Bachman (G)	United States	Dallas Stars	Cushing Academy (USHS-MA)
5	138	David McIntyre (C)	Canada	Dallas Stars (from Tampa Bay)	Newmarket Hurricanes (OPJRA)
5	150	Max Warn (LW)	Finland	Dallas Stars	HIFK Jr. (Fin. Jr.)

== See also ==
- 2006–07 NHL season
