= Alexander Hellström =

Swedish ice hockey player

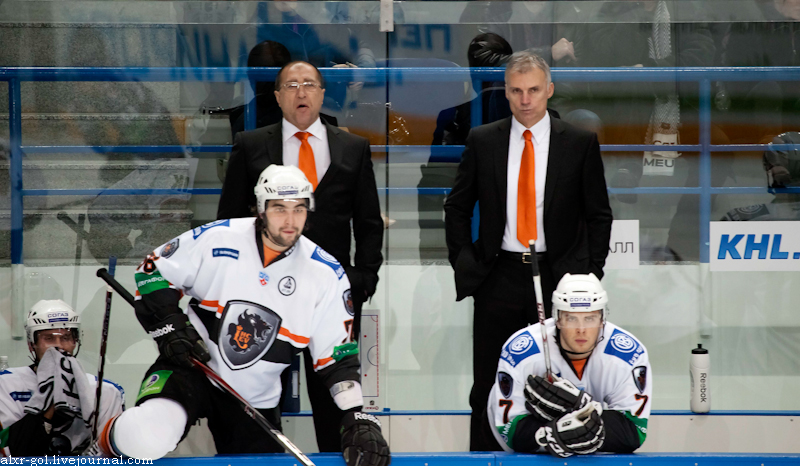
- Born: April 17, 1987 (age 39) Falun, Sweden
- Height: 6 ft 3 in (191 cm)
- Weight: 214 lb (97 kg; 15 st 4 lb)
- Position: Defence
- Shot: Left
- Played for: Peoria Rivermen; Luleå HF; HC Sibir Novosibirsk; HC Lev Poprad; HK SKP Poprad; Örebro HK
- NHL draft: 184th overall, 2006; St. Louis Blues
- Playing career: 2000–2021

Alexander Hellström (born 17 April 1987) is a Swedish former professional ice hockey defenceman, who last played for IF Björklöven of the HockeyAllsvenskan (Allsv). He was originally selected 184th overall, in the 2006 NHL entry draft by the St. Louis Blues.

== Playing career ==
On May 3, 2007, he was signed to a three-year entry-level contract with the Blues, however failed to make an impression in North America before he was returned on loan for the final year of his deal to the SHL with Luleå HF in the 2009–10 season.

On March 25, 2015, Hellström agreed to a two-year contract to return to the SHL with Örebro HK.

== Career statistics ==
=== Regular season and playoffs ===
			Regular season					Playoffs
Season	Team	League	GP	G	A	Pts	PIM	GP	G	A	Pts	PIM
2003–04	IF Björklöven	J18 Allsv	7	0	2	2	8	—	—	—	—	—
2004–05	IF Björklöven	Allsv	15	0	1	1	8	—	—	—	—	—
2005–06	IF Björklöven	J20	11	1	3	4	20	6	0	3	3	4
2005–06	IF Björklöven	Allsv	31	1	0	1	45	—	—	—	—	—
2006–07	IF Björklöven	J20	8	2	2	4	26	—	—	—	—	—
2006–07	IF Björklöven	Allsv	39	0	5	5	104	10	0	2	2	43
2007–08	Peoria Rivermen	AHL	33	3	2	5	38	—	—	—	—	—
2008–09	Peoria Rivermen	AHL	40	0	1	1	37	—	—	—	—	—
2008–09	Alaska Aces	ECHL	9	0	3	3	7	—	—	—	—	—
2009–10	Luleå HF	SEL	45	1	1	2	99	—	—	—	—	—
2010–11	Sibir Novosibirsk	KHL	45	0	2	2	45	4	0	0	0	2
2011–12	HC Lev Poprad	KHL	20	0	0	0	12	—	—	—	—	—
2011–12	HK AutoFinance Poprad	SVK	21	1	1	2	94	—	—	—	—	—
2011–12	IF Björklöven	SWE.3	12	0	4	4	6	—	—	—	—	—
2013–14	IF Björklöven	Allsv	49	0	3	3	95	—	—	—	—	—
2014–15	IF Björklöven	Allsv	52	1	4	5	78	5	0	0	0	8
2015–16	Örebro HK	SHL	49	0	2	2	67	2	0	1	1	2
2016–17	Örebro HK	SHL	51	0	4	4	40	—	—	—	—	—
2017–18	Örebro HK	SHL	46	0	6	6	59	—	—	—	—	—
2018–19	IF Björklöven	Allsv	43	0	1	1	32	—	—	—	—	—
2019–20	IF Björklöven	Allsv	32	0	2	2	66	2	0	0	0	0
2020–21	IF Björklöven	Allsv	16	1	1	2	8	12	0	0	0	27
Allsv totals			277	3	17	20	436	29	0	2	2	78
SEL/SHL totals			191	1	13	14	265	2	0	1	1	2

=== International ===
Year	Team	Event	GP	G	A	Pts	PIM
2005	Sweden	WJC18	7	0	0	0	4
2007	Sweden	WJC	7	0	0	0	8
Junior totals			14	0	0	0	12
