= Sébastien Bisaillon =

Canadian ice hockey player (born 1986)

- Born: December 8, 1986 (age 38); Mont-Laurier, Quebec, Canada
- Height: 6 ft 0 in (183 cm)
- Weight: 205 lb (93 kg; 14 st 9 lb)
- Position: Defence
- Shot: Right
- Played for: Edmonton Oilers; Kassel Huskies; Graz 99ers Diables Rouges de Briançon; Ducs d'Angers; Brûleurs de Loups
- NHL draft: Undrafted
- Playing career: 2007–2022

Sébastien Bisaillon (born December 8, 1986) is a Canadian former professional ice hockey defenceman who played 2 games in the National Hockey League with the Edmonton Oilers during the 2006–07 season. The rest of his career, which lasted from 2007 to 2022, was mainly spent in the French Ligue Magnus.

== Playing career ==
Bisaillon was born in Mont-Laurier, Quebec. As a youth, he played in the 2000 Quebec International Pee-Wee Hockey Tournament with the Sélects-du-Nord minor ice hockey team.

Bisaillon was signed as a free agent by the Edmonton Oilers on September 27, 2006. Due to a rash of injuries, Bisaillon was recalled on an emergency basis from his Junior team Val-d'Or Foreurs and played his first game for the Oilers on March 20, 2007, against the Vancouver Canucks.

In his first two professional seasons, Bisaillon spent time between the Oilers' two affiliates, the Springfield Falcons of the AHL, and the Stockton Thunder of the ECHL.

On September 3, 2009, Bisaillon signed as a free agent with the Kassel Huskies of the Deutsche Eishockey Liga for the 2009–10 season. Due to the Huskies folding at the end of the campaign, Bisaillon secured a try-out with the Montreal Canadiens for the 2010–11 season. On September 27, 2010, Bisaillon was assigned to the Canadiens' AHL affiliate, the Hamilton Bulldogs before being reassigned again to the ECHL.

Bisaillon left Diables Rouges de Briançon in April 2014 to sign with the Ducs d'Angers. In 2015, he signed with Brûleurs de Loups.

Before the 2015–16 season, Bisaillon was named an alternate captain for Brûleurs de Loups. He re-signed with Brûleurs de Loups on April 30, 2018, for the 2018–19 season.

== Career statistics ==
=== Regular season and playoffs ===
			Regular season					Playoffs
Season	Team	League	GP	G	A	Pts	PIM	GP	G	A	Pts	PIM
2002–03	Val-d'Or Foreurs	QMJHL	1	0	0	0	0	—	—	—	—	—
2003–04	Val-d'Or Foreurs	QMJHL	67	4	14	18	39	7	2	0	2	2
2004–05	Val-d'Or Foreurs	QMJHL	69	15	33	48	39	—	—	—	—	—
2005–06	Val d'Or Foruers	QMJHL	63	35	36	71	56	5	0	4	4	2
2006–07	Val d'Or Foruers	QMJHL	63	12	40	52	30	20	2	10	12	12
2006–07	Edmonton Oilers	NHL	2	0	0	0	0	—	—	—	—	—
2007–08	Springfield Falcons	AHL	21	3	7	10	10	—	—	—	—	—
2007–08	Stockton Thunder	ECHL	7	4	2	6	2	6	0	1	1	2
2008–09	Springfield Falcons	AHL	31	5	7	12	21	—	—	—	—	—
2008–09	Stockton Thunder	ECHL	27	3	7	10	14	3	0	1	1	2
2009–10	Kassel Huskies	DEL	54	2	7	9	72	—	—	—	—	—
2010–11	Wheeling Nailers	ECHL	44	6	13	19	20	—	—	—	—	—
2010–11	Hamilton Bulldogs	AHL	2	0	0	0	0	—	—	—	—	—
2011–12	Graz 99ers	EBEL	45	5	6	11	52	—	—	—	—	—
2013–14	Diables Rouges de Briançon	FRA	24	4	19	23	18	15	1	6	7	6
2014–15	Ducs d'Angers	FRA	24	3	12	15	72	10	1	0	1	10
2015–16	Brûleurs de Loups	FRA	24	3	5	8	36	5	1	0	1	4
2016–17	Brûleurs de Loups	FRA	44	5	15	20	30	12	1	7	8	4
2017–18	Brûleurs de Loups	FRA	42	4	22	26	28	17	5	14	19	2
2018–19	Brûleurs de Loups	FRA	44	11	21	32	57	15	2	6	8	8
2019–20	Brûleurs de Loups	FRA	40	11	25	36	32	—	—	—	—	—
2020–21	Brûleurs de Loups	FRA	16	1	7	8	22	—	—	—	—	—
2021–22	Brûleurs de Loups	FRA	42	6	19	25	38	14	1	4	5	8
FRA totals			300	48	145	193	333	88	12	37	49	42
NHL totals			2	0	0	0	0	—	—	—	—	—
