= Joël Perrault =

Canadian ice hockey player (born 1983)

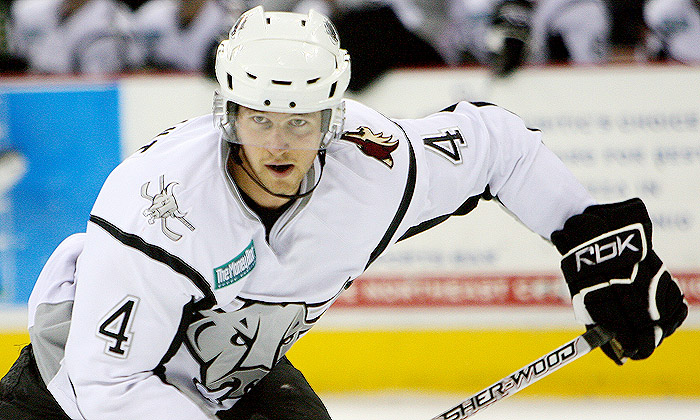
- Perrault with the San Antonio Rampage in 2007
- Born: April 6, 1983 (age 43) Montreal, Quebec, Canada
- Height: 6 ft 2 in (188 cm)
- Weight: 212 lb (96 kg; 15 st 2 lb)
- Position: Centre
- Shot: Right
- Played for: Phoenix Coyotes; St. Louis Blues; Vancouver Canucks; SCL Tigers; HC Ambrì-Piotta; IFK Helsinki; Krefeld Pinguine; Dragons de Rouen
- NHL draft: 137th overall, 2001; Mighty Ducks of Anaheim
- Playing career: 2003–2016

Joël Perrault (born April 6, 1983) is a Canadian former professional ice hockey centre who played a total of 96 games in the National Hockey League (NHL) throughout his playing career, which lasted from 2003 to 2016.

== Playing career ==
Perrault was drafted by the Mighty Ducks of Anaheim in the fifth round, 137th overall, in the 2001 NHL entry draft. In his last year of junior hockey, Perrault was the QMJHL's leading scorer while playing for the Baie-Comeau Drakkar.

After turning professional, Perrault spent two seasons in the American Hockey League (AHL) with the Cincinnati Mighty Ducks and the Portland Pirates before he was traded to the Phoenix Coyotes in exchange for Sean O'Donnell on March 9, 2006.

In the 2006–07 season on October 31, 2006, St. Louis Blues claimed Perrault of waivers before being reclaimed by the Coyotes on December 19, 2006. He also spent parts of the season in the AHL with the San Antonio Rampage and the Blues' minor affiliate, the Peoria Rivermen.

In 2007–08, Perrault split time between the NHL and AHL scoring 17 points in 49 games for the Coyotes. Over the following two seasons, he remained in the Phoenix organization but was unable to establish a permanent role in the NHL, often relied on as an offensive contributor with San Antonio.

On May 11, 2010, Perrault signed with Swiss team EV Zug of the National League A (NLA). With the inclusion of an out clause for NHL interest, Perrault opted out with EV Zug and signed a one-year contract with the Vancouver Canucks on July 1, 2010.

Perrault began the 2010–11 season in the AHL. He played 15 games for the Canucks' top affiliate, the Manitoba Moose, before being recalled to the NHL to make his Vancouver debut on November 20 in a 7–1 home game against the Chicago Blackhawks.

On February 28, 2011, Perrault was traded (along with a third-round pick in the 2012 NHL entry draft) to the Anaheim Ducks in exchange for Maxim Lapierre and MacGregor Sharp.

On May 5, 2011, Perrault again signed in Switzerland, agreeing to a one-year and optional second year contract with the SCL Tigers beginning in the 2011–12 season. On November 18, he signed a one-year contract with HC Ambrì-Piotta for the remainder of the season.

On July 20, 2012, Perrault signed with HIFK of the Finnish SM-liiga for the 2012–13 season. Midway through the campaign, he determined his stay in Finland would be a solitary season after signing a contract for the following season with Krefeld Pinguine of the Deutsche Eishockey Liga (DEL) on December 10, 2013, also spending the 2014–15 season with the club.

In December 2015, Perrault signed with Dragons de Rouen of the French Ligue Magnus for the remainder of the 2015–16 season. He helped Rouen win the French championship, the French Cup competition as well as the IIHF Continental Cup. Perrault retired from professional hockey at the end of the season in March 2016.

== Career statistics ==
			Regular season					Playoffs
Season	Team	League	GP	G	A	Pts	PIM	GP	G	A	Pts	PIM
1999–2000	Collège Antoine–Girouard	QMAAA	19	4	7	11	6	—	—	—	—	—
2000–01	Baie–Comeau Drakkar	QMJHL	68	10	14	24	46	11	1	1	2	10
2001–02	Baie–Comeau Drakkar	QMJHL	57	18	44	62	96	5	2	0	2	6
2002–03	Baie–Comeau Drakkar	QMJHL	70	51	65	116	93	12	3	7	10	14
2003–04	Cincinnati Mighty Ducks	AHL	65	14	14	28	38	9	1	1	2	2
2004–05	Cincinnati Mighty Ducks	AHL	51	9	19	28	40	—	—	—	—	—
2005–06	Augusta Lynx	ECHL	3	4	2	6	2	—	—	—	—	—
2005–06	Portland Pirates	AHL	25	12	12	24	20	—	—	—	—	—
2005–06	San Antonio Rampage	AHL	12	1	6	7	4	—	—	—	—	—
2005–06	Phoenix Coyotes	NHL	5	1	1	2	2	—	—	—	—	—
2006–07	Phoenix Coyotes	NHL	15	1	2	3	14	—	—	—	—	—
2006–07	St. Louis Blues	NHL	11	0	0	0	0	—	—	—	—	—
2006–07	Peoria Rivermen	AHL	2	0	2	2	7	—	—	—	—	—
2006–07	San Antonio Rampage	AHL	21	10	4	14	8	—	—	—	—	—
2007–08	San Antonio Rampage	AHL	28	14	13	27	36	—	—	—	—	—
2007–08	Phoenix Coyotes	NHL	49	7	10	17	48	—	—	—	—	—
2008–09	Phoenix Coyotes	NHL	7	2	1	3	4	—	—	—	—	—
2008–09	San Antonio Rampage	AHL	46	18	31	49	46	—	—	—	—	—
2009–10	San Antonio Rampage	AHL	47	17	19	36	38	—	—	—	—	—
2009–10	Phoenix Coyotes	NHL	2	1	0	1	0	—	—	—	—	—
2010–11	Manitoba Moose	AHL	37	5	18	23	43	—	—	—	—	—
2010–11	Vancouver Canucks	NHL	7	0	0	0	0	—	—	—	—	—
2011–12	SCL Tigers	NLA	23	5	6	11	20	—	—	—	—	—
2011–12	HC Ambrì–Piotta	NLA	27	7	11	18	36	—	—	—	—	—
2012–13	HIFK	SM-liiga	20	4	5	9	28	5	0	1	1	16
2013–14	Krefeld Pinguine	DEL	24	8	12	20	28	5	1	0	1	6
2014–15	Krefeld Pinguine	DEL	42	13	19	32	56	3	0	1	1	14
2015–16	Dragons de Rouen	FRA	12	2	2	4	14	15	1	7	8	28
AHL totals			334	100	138	238	280	9	1	1	2	2
NHL totals			96	12	14	26	68	—	—	—	—	—

== Awards ==
- 2002–03 QMJHL First All-Star team
- 2002–03 QMJHL Jean Beliveau Trophy (Leading Scorer)
- 2002–03 QMJHL Michel Briere Trophy (MVP)
- 2002–03 CHL First All-Star team
