= 2006–07 Calgary Flames season =

NHL team season

2006–07 Calgary Flames
- Division: 3rd Northwest
- Conference: 8th Western
- 2006–07 record: 43–29–10
- Home record: 30–9–2
- Road record: 13–20–8
- Goals for: 258
- Goals against: 226

Team information
- General manager: Darryl Sutter
- Coach: Jim Playfair
- Captain: Jarome Iginla
- Alternate captains: Robyn Regehr; Rhett Warrener (Feb.–Apr.); Stephane Yelle
- Arena: Pengrowth Saddledome
- Average attendance: 19,289 (6th)
- Minor league affiliates: Omaha Ak-Sar-Ben Knights; Las Vegas Wranglers

Team leaders
- Goals: Jarome Iginla (39)
- Assists: Alex Tanguay (59)
- Points: Jarome Iginla (94)
- Penalty minutes: Dion Phaneuf (98)
- Plus/minus: Robyn Regehr (+27)
- Wins: Miikka Kiprusoff (40)
- Goals against average: Miikka Kiprusoff (2.46)

The 2006–07 Calgary Flames season began with a great deal of promise following the acquisition of top forward Alex Tanguay from the Colorado Avalanche. The other major off-season news was that Darryl Sutter promoted his assistant coach, Jim Playfair, to head coach as Sutter stayed with the team as general manager only.

A pre-season favorite to win the National Hockey League's Northwest Division, the Flames struggled out of the gate in October before a six-game winning streak, and a franchise record ten consecutive home wins in November and December, brought the Flames back into contention in the tight Northwest Division.

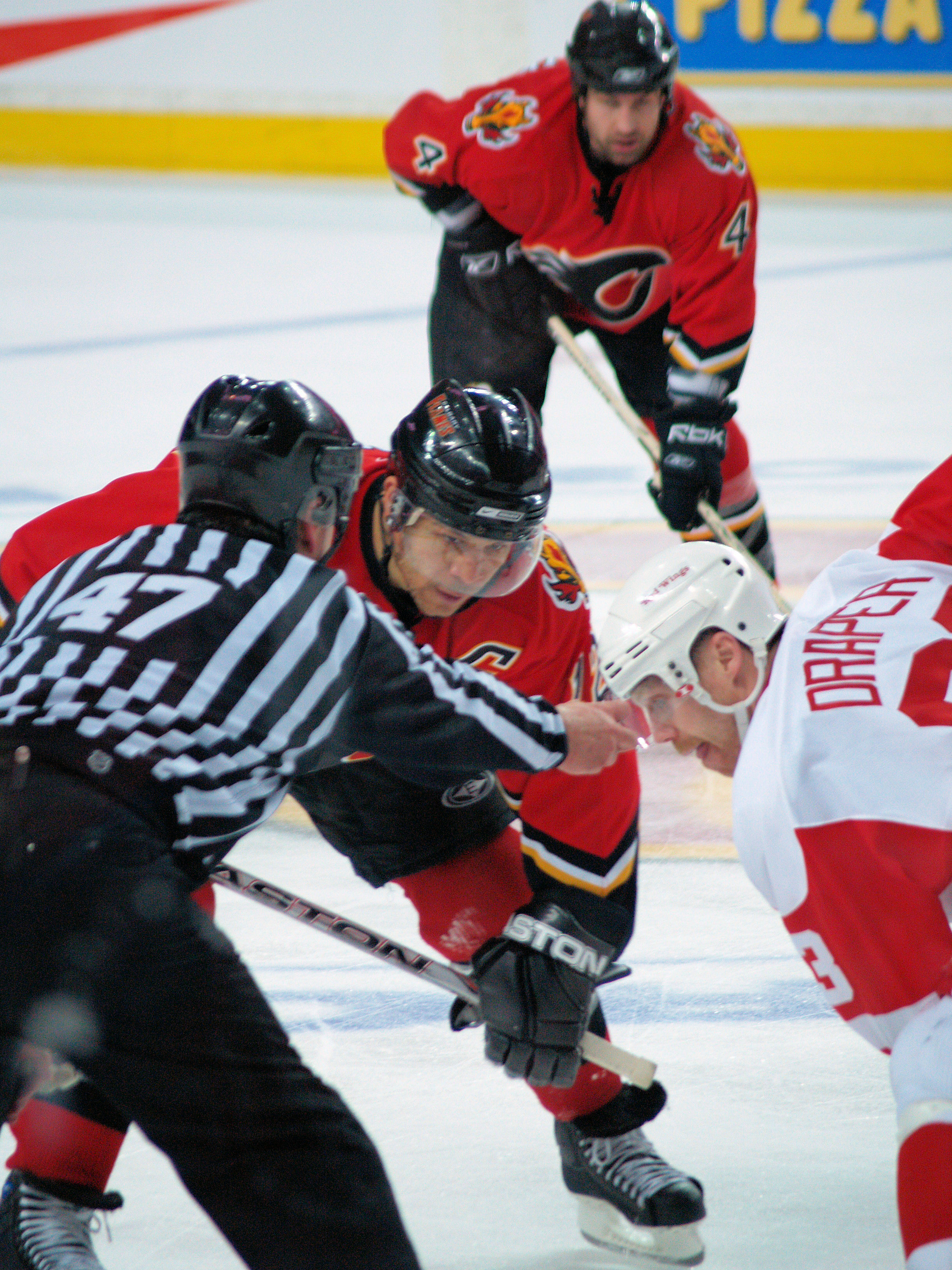
Jarome Iginla and Kris Draper taking a faceoff in game 4 of the Conference Quarterfinal.

A January crash proved that the Flames were unable to live up to the pre-season hype. Hoping to rejuvenate the team, GM Sutter orchestrated a trade with the Los Angeles Kings to bring Craig Conroy back to the team. However, there was a lack of passion even after the mid-season shake-up. The Flames struggled to an eighth seed finish in the Western Conference, having to stave off a furious challenge for the final playoff spot by Colorado. The Flames entered the 2007 Stanley Cup Playoffs with a first-round match-up against the Detroit Red Wings, falling in six games to the top-seeded Red Wings.

The lackluster season and poor playoff performance led to widespread criticism of rookie head coach Jim Playfair. TSN analyst Bob McKenzie even suggested replacing Playfair after game two of the Flames playoff series against Detroit. Following the season, however, several players defended their coach. Despite this, Playfair was relieved of his duties prior to the 2007–08 season.

== Regular season ==
Two Flames were named to the roster for the 2007 All Star Game: goaltender Miikka Kiprusoff and defenceman Dion Phaneuf. It was the first appearance for both. Jarome Iginla would have been named to the team as well, but his knee injury kept him out of the game.

On February 3, 2007, the Flames made history by having young Cree singer Akina Shirt perform "O Canada" in Woodlands Cree, the first time the national anthem had ever been performed in an Aboriginal language at a major league sporting event.

On February 6, the Flames retired Mike Vernon's #30. Vernon, who was instrumental in the Flames trip to the Stanley Cup Finals in 1986 and their Cup victory in 1989 became the second Flame to have his number raised to the rafters, preceded only by Lanny McDonald.

The Flames entered the stretch drive by re-acquiring fan favorite, and former Flame, Craig Conroy in a deal with the Los Angeles Kings, then by completing a significant trade with the Boston Bruins, acquiring defenceman Brad Stuart along with Wayne Primeau for Chuck Kobasew and Andrew Ference.

On February 24, Jarome Iginla scored his 315th career goal, moving him past Joe Nieuwendyk into second on the Flames all-time goal scoring list. Theoren Fleury was the Flames all-time leading scorer at 364 goals. Miikka Kiprusoff broke Dan Bouchard's franchise record for career shutouts as a Flame when he recorded his 21st in a 1–0 shootout victory against the Minnesota Wild on March 27.

The Flames were not shut out in any of their 82 regular-season games.

=== Season standings ===
Northwest Division
No.	CR		GP	W	L	OTL	GF	GA	Pts
1	3	**Vancouver Canucks**	82	49	26	7	222	201	105
2	7	**Minnesota Wild**	82	48	26	8	235	191	104
3	8	**Calgary Flames**	82	43	29	10	258	226	96
4	9	Colorado Avalanche	82	44	31	7	272	251	95
5	12	Edmonton Oilers	82	32	43	7	195	248	71

Note: CR = Conference rank; GP = Games played; W = Wins; L = Losses; T = Ties; OTL = Overtime/shootout loss; GF = Goals for; GA = Goals against; PIM = Penalties in minutes; Pts = Points
Bolded teams qualified for the playoffs.

Western Conference
R		Div	GP	W	L	OTL	GF	GA	Pts
**1**	**z-Detroit Red Wings**	**CE**	**82**	**50**	**19**	**13**	**254**	**199**	**113**
**2**	**y-Anaheim Ducks**	**PA**	**82**	**48**	**20**	**14**	**258**	**208**	**110**
**3**	**y-Vancouver Canucks**	**NW**	**82**	**49**	**26**	**7**	**222**	**201**	**105**
**4**	**Nashville Predators**	**CE**	**82**	**51**	**23**	**8**	**272**	**212**	**110**
**5**	**San Jose Sharks**	**PA**	**82**	**51**	**26**	**5**	**258**	**199**	**107**
**6**	**Dallas Stars**	**PA**	**82**	**50**	**25**	**7**	**226**	**197**	**107**
**7**	**Minnesota Wild**	**NW**	**82**	**48**	**26**	**8**	**235**	**191**	**104**
**8**	**Calgary Flames**	**NW**	**82**	**43**	**29**	**10**	**258**	**226**	**96**
8.5
9	Colorado Avalanche	NW	82	44	31	7	272	251	95
10	St. Louis Blues	CE	82	34	35	13	214	254	81
11	Columbus Blue Jackets	CE	82	33	42	7	201	249	73
12	Edmonton Oilers	NW	82	32	43	7	195	248	71
13	Chicago Blackhawks	CE	82	31	42	9	201	258	71
14	Los Angeles Kings	PA	82	27	41	14	227	283	68
15	Phoenix Coyotes	PA	82	31	46	5	216	284	67

bold - qualified for playoffs, y - division title, z - best conference record
CE - Central Division, NW - Northwest Division, PA - Pacific Division

== Playoffs ==
The Flames qualified for the playoffs for the third consecutive season. Calgary entered the 2007 Stanley Cup Playoffs as the 8th seed in the Western Conference and started on the road against the top ranked Detroit Red Wings. The Flames were unable to defend against the Wings' ferocious attack, with goaltender Miikka Kiprusoff facing an average of 42 shots per game during the series as Calgary fell to Detroit in six games.

Game five, in Detroit, ended with a series of nasty incidents as the Flames' frustration got the better of them. Upset with Detroit's constant bumping of Miikka Kiprusoff throughout the series, and angry with what they believed was an illegal, low-bridge hit by Brett Lebda on Daymond Lankow late in the 5–1 loss, the Flames lashed out. First Langkow delivered a quick punch to the face of Lebda following that hit, and later backup goaltender Jamie McLennan delivered a two-handed slash to Wings forward Johan Franzen after only being in goal for eighteen seconds. McLennan received a match penalty for the slash, and was suspended five games by the NHL. Head coach Jim Playfair was fined $25,000, and the Flames organization $100,000. Franzen would exact a measure of revenge for the hit in game six by scoring the winning goal in double overtime that eliminated the Flames.

The Flames were not shut out in any of their 6 playoff games.

== Schedule and results ==
=== Regular season ===
2006–07 regular season
October: 3–6–1 (home: 2–3–0; road: 1–3–1)

Game	Date	Visitor	Score	Home	OT	Decision	Attendance	Record	Points	Recap
1	October 5	Calgary	1 – 3	Edmonton		Kiprusoff	16,839	0–1–0	0	L
2	October 7	Edmonton	1 – 2	Calgary		Kiprusoff	19,289	1–1–0	2	W
3	October 9	San Jose	4 – 1	Calgary		Kiprusoff	19,289	1–2–0	2	L
4	October 12	Calgary	1 – 0	Ottawa		Kiprusoff	18,404	2–2–0	4	W
5	October 14	Calgary	4 – 5	Toronto	OT	Kiprusoff	19,338	2–2–1	5	OTL
6	October 17	Calgary	4 – 5	Montreal		Kiprusoff	21,273	2–3–1	5	L
7	October 19	Calgary	2 – 3	Boston		Kiprusoff	17,565	2–4–1	5	L
8	October 24	Phoenix	1 – 6	Calgary		Kiprusoff	19,289	3–4–1	7	W
9	October 28	Nashville	3 – 2	Calgary		Kiprusoff	19,289	3–5–1	7	L
10	October 30	Washington	4 – 2	Calgary		Kiprusoff	19,289	3–6–1	7	L

November: 8–4–1 (home: 6–0–0; road: 2–4–1)

Game	Date	Visitor	Score	Home	OT	Decision	Attendance	Record	Points	Recap
11	November 1	Calgary	2 – 3	Detroit		Kiprusoff	20,066	3–7–1	7	L
12	November 3	Calgary	4 – 5	Columbus	SO	McLennan	16,103	3–7–2	8	OTL
13	November 4	Calgary	3 – 2	St. Louis		Kiprusoff	12,097	4–7–2	10	W
14	November 7	Dallas	1 – 3	Calgary		Kiprusoff	19,289	5–7–2	12	W
15	November 10	Anaheim	0 – 3	Calgary		Kiprusoff	19,289	6–7–2	14	W
16	November 11	Calgary	3 – 2	Vancouver		Kiprusoff	18,630	7–7–2	16	W
17	November 14	St. Louis	0 – 3	Calgary		Kiprusoff	19,289	8–7–2	18	W
18	November 17	Detroit	1 – 4	Calgary		Kiprusoff	19,289	9–7–2	20	W
19	November 21	Calgary	1 – 2	Edmonton		Kiprusoff	16,839	9–8–2	20	L
20	November 22	Chicago	1 – 4	Calgary		Kiprusoff	19,289	10–8–2	22	W
21	November 25	Calgary	1 – 3	Los Angeles		Kiprusoff	17,043	10–9–2	22	L
22	November 26	Calgary	3 – 5	Anaheim		McLennan	17,174	10–10–2	22	L
23	November 28	Colorado	2 – 5	Calgary		Kiprusoff	19,289	11–10–2	24	W

December: 8–4–2 (home: 6–1–0; road: 2–3–2)

Game	Date	Visitor	Score	Home	OT	Decision	Attendance	Record	Points	Recap
24	December 1	Columbus	1 – 2	Calgary		Kiprusoff	19,289	12–10–2	26	W
25	December 5	Carolina	0 – 3	Calgary		Kiprusoff	19,289	13–10–2	28	W
26	December 7	Calgary	2 – 3	Minnesota	OT	Kiprusoff	18,568	13–10–3	29	OTL
27	December 9	Vancouver	3 – 5	Calgary		Kiprusoff	19,289	14–10–3	31	W
28	December 12	Minnesota	2 – 5	Calgary		Kiprusoff	19,289	15–10–3	33	W
29	December 14	Calgary	1 – 3	Vancouver		Kiprusoff	18,630	15–11–3	33	L
30	December 16	Calgary	6 – 3	Phoenix		Kiprusoff	15,551	16–11–3	35	W
31	December 18	Calgary	1 – 4	Anaheim		Kiprusoff	17,174	16–12–3	35	L
32	December 19	Calgary	5 – 3	Los Angeles		McLennan	17,247	17–12–3	37	W
	December 21	Calgary	PPD^{†}	Colorado						
33	December 23	Calgary	1 – 4	San Jose		Kiprusoff	17,496	17–13–3	37	L
34	December 26	Vancouver	3 – 1	Calgary		Kiprusoff	19,289	17–14–3	37	L
35	December 27	Calgary	5 – 6	Vancouver	OT	Kiprusoff	18,630	17–14–4	38	OTL
36	December 29	Los Angeles	4 – 6	Calgary		Kiprusoff	19,289	18–14–4	40	W
37	December 31	Edmonton	2 – 4	Calgary		Kiprusoff	19,289	19–14–4	42	W
^{†}December 21 game @ Colorado was postponed due to a snowstorm in Denver. It was the first postponement of a game in Flames franchise history.

January: 8–3–2 (home: 6–1–0; road: 2–2–2)

Game	Date	Visitor	Score	Home	OT	Decision	Attendance	Record	Points	Recap
38	January 2	Vancouver	3 – 2	Calgary		Kiprusoff	19,289	19–15–4	42	L
39	January 4	Florida	4 – 5	Calgary	OT	McLennan	19,289	20–15–4	44	W
40	January 6	Dallas	2 – 4	Calgary		Kiprusoff	19,289	21–15–4	46	W
41	January 9	Minnesota	0 – 3	Calgary		Kiprusoff	19,289	22–15–4	48	W
42	January 11	Calgary	7 – 3	Colorado		Kiprusoff	18,007	23–15–4	50	W
43	January 13	Edmonton	1 – 3	Calgary		Kiprusoff	19,289	24–15–4	52	W
44	January 15	Calgary	3 – 5	Nashville		Kiprusoff	12,011	24–16–4	52	L
45	January 17	Calgary	2 – 4	Dallas		Kiprusoff	18,532	24–17–4	52	L
46	January 19	Anaheim	2 – 3	Calgary		Kiprusoff	19,289	25–17–4	54	W
47	January 20	Calgary	4 – 0	Edmonton		Kiprusoff	16,839	26–17–4	56	W
48	January 26	Calgary	1 – 2	Minnesota	SO	Kiprusoff	15,568	26–17–5	57	OTL
49	January 28	Calgary	3 – 4	Chicago	OT	Kiprusoff	11,182	26–17–6	58	OTL
50	January 30	Los Angeles	1–4	Calgary		Kiprusoff	19,289	27–17–6	60	W

February: 7–4–3 (home: 7–1–1; road: 0–3–2)

Game	Date	Visitor	Score	Home	OT	Decision	Attendance	Record	Points	Recap
51	February 2	Columbus	2 – 6	Calgary		Kiprusoff	19,289	28–18–6	62	W
52	February 3	Vancouver	3 – 4	Calgary		Kiprusoff	19,289	29–18–6	64	W
53	February 6	Chicago	3 – 2	Calgary	SO	Kiprusoff	19,289	29–18–7	65	OTL
54	February 8	Calgary	1 – 2	Columbus		McLennan	15,739	29–19–7	65	L
55	February 10	Calgary	2 – 3	Buffalo	SO	Kiprusoff	18,690	29–19–8	66	OTL
56	February 11	Calgary	4 – 7	Detroit		McLennan	20,066	29–20–8	66	L
57	February 13	Atlanta	1 – 4	Calgary		Kiprusoff	19,289	30–20–8	68	W
58	February 15	Colorado	7 – 5	Calgary		Kiprusoff	19,289	30–21–8	68	L
59	February 17	Colorado	2 – 5	Calgary		Kiprusoff	19,289	31–21–8	70	W
60	February 20	Calgary	3 – 4	Colorado		Kiprusoff	17,623	31–22–8	70	L
61	February 22	Calgary	2 – 3	Phoenix	OT	Kiprusoff	15,805	31–22–9	71	OTL
62	February 24	San Jose	4 – 7	Calgary		Kiprusoff	19,289	32–22–9	73	W
63	February 26	Phoenix	2 – 5	Calgary		McLennan	19,289	33–22–9	75	W
64	February 28	Minnesota	1 – 2	Calgary	SO	Kiprusoff	19,289	34–22–9	77	W

March: 9–4–1 (home: 3–1–1; road: 6–3–0)

Game	Date	Visitor	Score	Home	OT	Decision	Attendance	Record	Points	Recap
65	March 3	Calgary	4 – 2	Edmonton		Kiprusoff	16,839	35–22–9	79	W
66	March 6	Calgary	4 – 2	St. Louis		Kiprusoff	12,166	36–22–9	81	W
67	March 8	Calgary	3 – 6	Nashville		Kiprusoff	15,515	36–23–9	81	L
68	March 10	Tampa Bay	3 – 2	Calgary	OT	Kiprusoff	19,289	36–23–10	82	OTL
69	March 12	St. Louis	4 – 5	Calgary	SO	Kiprusoff	19,289	37–23–10	84	W
70	March 14	Calgary	2 – 3	Colorado		Kiprusoff	17,426	37–24–10	84	L
71	March 15	Calgary	2 – 4	Dallas		McLennan	18,532	37–25–10	84	L
72	March 17	Minnesota	4 – 2	Calgary		Kiprusoff	19,289	37–26–10	84	L
73	March 20	Detroit	1 – 2	Calgary		Kiprusoff	19,289	38–26–10	86	W
74	March 22	Nashville	2 – 3	Calgary	OT	Kiprusoff	19,289	39–26–10	88	W
75	March 25	Calgary	3 – 2	Chicago		Kiprusoff	10,178	40–26–10	90	W
76	March 27	Calgary	1 – 0	Minnesota	SO	Kiprusoff	18,568	41–26–10	92	W
77	March 29	Calgary	4 – 2	Minnesota		Kiprusoff	18,568	42–26–10	94	W
78	March 31	Calgary	3 – 2	Vancouver		Kiprusoff	18,630	43–26–10	96	W

April: 0–4–0 (home: 0–2–0; road: 0–2–0)

Game	Date	Visitor	Score	Home	OT	Decision	Attendance	Record	Points	Recap
79	April 3	Colorado	4 – 3	Calgary		Kiprusoff	19,289	43–27–10	96	L
80	April 5	Calgary	3 – 4	San Jose		Kiprusoff	17,496	43–28–10	96	L
81	April 7	Edmonton	3 – 2	Calgary		Kiprusoff	19,289	43–29–10	96	L
82	April 8^{†}	Calgary	3 – 6	Colorado		McClennan	17,551	43–29–10	96	L
^{†}Makeup date for the December 21 postponement

Legend: W Win (2 points) L Loss (0 points) OTL Overtime/shootout loss (1 point)

=== Playoffs ===
2007 Stanley Cup playoffs
Western Conference Quarterfinals vs. Detroit Red Wings (1) – Red Wings win 4–2

Game	Date	Visitor	Score	Home	OT	Decision	Attendance	Series	Recap
1	April 12	Calgary	1 – 4	Detroit		Kiprusoff	19,204	Detroit leads 1–0	L
2	April 15	Calgary	1 – 3	Detroit		Kiprusoff	19,751	Detroit leads 2–0	L
3	April 17	Detroit	2 – 3	Calgary		Kiprusoff	19,289	Detroit leads 2–1	W
4	April 19	Detroit	2 – 3	Calgary		Kiprusoff	19,289	Series tied 2–2	W
5	April 21	Calgary	1 – 5	Detroit		Kiprusoff	19,340	Detroit leads 3–2	L
6	April 22	Detroit	2 – 1	Calgary	2OT	Kiprosoff	19,289	Detroit wins 4–2	L

Legend: W Win L Loss

== Player statistics ==
=== Scoring ===
- Position abbreviations: C = Centre; D = Defence; G = Goaltender; LW = Left wing; RW = Right wing
- † = Joined team via a transaction (e.g., trade, waivers, signing) during the season. Stats reflect time with the Flames only.
- ‡ = Left team via a transaction (e.g., trade, waivers, release) during the season. Stats reflect time with the Flames only.

No.	Player	Pos	Regular season						Playoffs					
No.	Player	Pos	GP	G	A	Pts	+/-	PIM	GP	G	A	Pts	+/-	PIM
12	Jarome Iginla	RW	70	39	55	94	12	40	6	2	2	4	−2	12
40	Alex Tanguay	LW	81	22	59	81	12	44	6	1	3	4	−2	8
20	Kristian Huselius	LW	81	34	43	77	21	26	6	0	2	2	−4	4
22	Daymond Langkow	C	81	33	44	77	23	44	6	2	2	4	−3	4
3	Dion Phaneuf	D	79	17	33	50	10	98	6	1	0	1	−4	7
18	Matthew Lombardi	C	81	20	26	46	10	48	6	1	1	2	−1	0
4	Roman Hamrlik	D	75	7	31	38	22	88	6	0	1	1	−3	8
10	Tony Amonte	RW	81	10	20	30	−4	40	6	0	1	1	−1	0
11	Stephane Yelle	C	56	10	14	24	5	32	6	0	0	0	−3	2
24	Craig Conroy†	C	28	8	13	21	10	18	6	1	1	2	−1	8
28	Robyn Regehr	D	78	2	19	21	27	75	1	0	0	0	−1	0
58	David Moss	LW	41	10	8	18	5	12	6	0	1	1	−3	0
19	Chuck Kobasew‡	RW	40	4	13	17	7	37	—	—	—	—	—	—
5	Mark Giordano	D	48	7	8	15	7	36	4	1	0	1	−1	0
26	Marcus Nilson	LW	63	5	10	15	7	27	6	0	0	0	−3	2
15	Byron Ritchie	C	64	8	6	14	3	68	1	0	0	0	0	10
16	Jeff Friesen	LW	72	6	6	12	−2	34	5	0	0	0	−1	2
21	Andrew Ference‡	D	54	2	10	12	7	66	—	—	—	—	—	—
44	Rhett Warrener	D	62	4	6	10	6	67	6	0	0	0	−3	10
19	Wayne Primeau†	C	27	3	4	7	−2	36	6	0	2	2	−1	14
7	Andrei Zyuzin	D	49	1	5	6	−2	30	5	1	0	1	0	2
6	Brad Stuart†	D	27	0	5	5	12	18	6	0	1	1	−3	6
41	Dustin Boyd	C	13	2	2	4	5	4	—	—	—	—	—	—
24	Jamie Lundmark‡	C	39	0	4	4	−4	31	—	—	—	—	—	—
49	Richie Regehr	D	6	1	1	2	−1	0	—	—	—	—	—	—
17	Eric Godard	RW	19	0	1	1	0	50	—	—	—	—	—	—
8	Brad Ference	D	5	0	0	0	−1	2	—	—	—	—	—	—
39	Carsen Germyn	C	2	0	0	0	0	0	—	—	—	—	—	—
21	David Hale†	D	11	0	0	0	−2	10	2	0	0	0	−1	6
34	Miikka Kiprusoff	G	74	0	0	0		2	6	0	0	0		0
57	Tomi Maki	RW	1	0	0	0	0	0	—	—	—	—	—	—
25	Darren McCarty	RW	32	0	0	0	−3	58	—	—	—	—	—	—
29	Jamie McLennan	G	9	0	0	0		16	1	0	0	0		12
37	Brandon Prust	C	10	0	0	0	1	25	—	—	—	—	—	—

=== Goaltending ===
No.	Player	Regular season										Playoffs								
No.	Player	GP	W	L	OT	SA	GA	GAA	SV%	SO	TOI	GP	W	L	SA	GA	GAA	SV%	SO	TOI
34	Miikka Kiprusoff	74	40	24	9	2190	181	2.46	.917	7	4419	6	2	4	255	18	2.82	.929	0	384
29	Jamie McLennan	9	3	5	1	304	32	3.60	.895	0	533	1	0	0	0	0	0.00	—	0	0:18

== Awards and records ==
=== Awards ===
Type	Award/honour	Recipient	Ref
League (in-season)	NHL All-Star Game selection	Miikka Kiprusoff	
League (in-season)	NHL All-Star Game selection	Dion Phaneuf	
League (in-season)	NHL First Star of the Month	Jarome Iginla (December)	
League (in-season)	NHL First Star of the Week	Miikka Kiprusoff (April 1)	
League (in-season)	NHL Second Star of the Week	Miikka Kiprusoff (November 12)	
League (in-season)	NHL Second Star of the Week	Miikka Kiprusoff (January 14)	
League (in-season)	NHL Third Star of the Week	Jarome Iginla (December 17)	
Team	J. R. "Bud" McCaig Award	Stephane Yelle	
Team	Molson Cup	Miikka Kiprusoff	
Team	Ralph T. Scurfield Humanitarian Award	Rhett Warrener	

=== Records ===
- 10 game home winning streak (November 7 – December 12); previous record was 9, set five times.
- 21 career shutouts as a Flame: Miikka Kiprusoff (March 27 at Minnesota).

=== Milestones ===
- First game: Dustin Boyd (November 1 at Detroit)
- First game: Brandon Prust (November 1 at Detroit)
- 300 assists: Jarome Iginla (December 5 vs Carolina).
- 300 goals: Jarome Iginla (December 7 at Minnesota).
- 600 points: Jarome Iginla (December 7 at Minnesota).
- First game: Tomi Maki (December 12 vs. Minnesota)
- First game: David Moss (December 19 at Los Angeles)
- 100 wins: Miikka Kiprusoff (January 9 vs Minnesota).

== Transactions ==
The Flames were involved in the following transactions from June 20, 2006, the day after the deciding game of the 2006 Stanley Cup Finals, through June 6, 2007, the day of the deciding game of the 2007 Stanley Cup Finals.

=== Trades ===
Date	Details		Ref
June 24, 2006	To Calgary Flames: Alex Tanguay	To Colorado Avalanche: Jordan Leopold; 2nd-round pick in 2006; Conditional 2nd-round pick in 2007 or 2008	
January 29, 2007	To Calgary Flames: Craig Conroy	To Los Angeles Kings: Jamie Lundmark; 4th-round pick in 2007; 2nd-round pick in 2008	
February 10, 2007	To Calgary Flames: Wayne Primeau; Brad Stuart; Conditional 4th-round pick in 2008 (Note: Condition met. Calgary received the pick since Stuart did not re-sign with them and instead signed with the Los Angeles Kings as a free agent on July 3, 2007.)	To Boston Bruins: Andrew Ference; Chuck Kobasew	
February 27, 2007	To Calgary Flames: David Hale; 5th-round pick in 2007	To New Jersey Devils: 3rd-round pick in 2007	

=== Players acquired ===
Date	Player	Former team	Term	Via	Ref
July 1, 2006	Andrei Zyuzin	Minnesota Wild	multi-year	Free agency	
July 5, 2006	Jeff Friesen	Anaheim Ducks	1-year	Free agency	
July 6, 2006	Jamie McLennan	Florida Panthers	2-year	Free agency	
July 27, 2006	Brad Ference	New Jersey Devils		Free agency	
August 10, 2006	Eric Godard	New York Islanders	1-year	Free agency	
May 22, 2007	Brad Cole	Saskatoon Blades (WHL)		Free agency	

=== Players lost ===
Date	Player	New team	Via (Note: In parentheses is the player's free agency group on July 1 if applicable.)	Ref
July 1, 2006	Cale Hulse (Note: Hulse retired.)		Contract expiration (III)	
July 1, 2006	Mike Leclerc (Note: Leclerc retired.)		Contract expiration (III)	
July 1, 2006	Darren Lynch (Note: Lynch retired.)		Contract expiration (UFA)	
July 1, 2006	Bryan Marchment (Note: Marchment retired.)		Contract expiration (III)	
July 2, 2006	Shean Donovan	Boston Bruins	Free agency (III)	
July 11, 2006	Chris Simon	New York Islanders	Free agency (III)	
August 1, 2006	Craig MacDonald	Chicago Blackhawks	Free agency (III)	
August 25, 2006	Lynn Loyns	Krefeld Pinguine (DEL)	Free agency (VI)	
September 3, 2006	Brantt Myhres	Newcastle Vipers (EIHL)	Free agency (III)	
September 23, 2006	Brian Boucher	Chicago Blackhawks	Free agency (III)	
N/A	Zenith Komarniski	Lamont Bruins (NCHL)	Free agency (VI)	

=== Signings ===
Date	Player	Term	Contract type	Ref
July 5, 2006	Alex Tanguay	3-year	Re-signing	
July 18, 2006	Tim Ramholt		Entry-level	
August 17, 2006	Matthew Lombardi		Re-signing	
August 19, 2006	Carsen Germyn		Re-signing	
September 5, 2006	Andrei Taratukhin	2-year	Entry-level	
September 29, 2006	Andrew Ference	3-year	Extension	
December 18, 2006	Dan Ryder		Entry-level	
December 31, 2006	J. D. Watt		Entry-level	
January 2, 2007	Kevin Lalande		Entry-level	
January 18, 2007	Leland Irving		Entry-level	
May 22, 2007	Gord Baldwin		Entry-level	
May 22, 2007	Matt Keetley		Entry-level	
May 22, 2007	Matt Pelech		Entry-level	
May 22, 2007	Brett Sutter		Entry-level	
June 1, 2007	Matthew Lombardi	3-year	Extension	
June 1, 2007	Marcus Nilson	2-year	Extension	

== Draft picks ==
Calgary's picks at the 2006 NHL entry draft in Vancouver, British Columbia. The Flames picked 26th overall for the second consecutive draft.

Rnd	Pick	Player	Nationality	Position	Team (league)	NHL statistics				
Rnd	Pick	Player	Nationality	Position	Team (league)	GP	G	A	Pts	PIM
1	26	Leland Irving	Canada	G	Everett Silvertips (WHL	13	3–4–4, 3.25 GAA, .902Sv%			
3	87	John Armstrong	Canada	C/RW	Plymouth Whalers (OHL)					
3	89	Aaron Marvin	United States	F	Warroad (USHS-MN)					
4	118	Hugo Carpentier	Canada	C	Rouyn-Noranda Huskies (QMJHL)					
5	149	Juuso Puustinen	Finland	RW	Kalpa Jr.					
6	179	Jordan Fulton	United States	C	Breck (USHS-MN)					
7	187	Devin DiDiomete	Canada	LW	Sudbury Wolves (OHL)					
7	209	Per Johnsson	Sweden	F	Farjestad Jr.					

Statistics are updated to the end of the 2013–14 NHL season. ^{†} denotes player was on an NHL roster in 2013–14.

== Farm teams ==
=== Omaha Ak-Sar-Ben Knights ===
The 2006–07 AHL season was the second for the Ak-Sar-Ben Knights. The Knights finished a top the Western Conference standings, winning the West Division with a 49–25–5–1 record, earning their first playoff appearance. Omaha was upset in the first round of the Calder Cup playoffs by the Iowa Stars, however, losing four games to two.

Following the season, rumours swirled around the future of the team, which ranked at or near the bottom of league attendance in its first two seasons, and lost us$4 million over two years. The rumour would quickly be confirmed as the Flames announced that the team was leaving Nebraska for the Quad Cities of Iowa and Illinois to become the Quad City Flames for the 2007–08 season.

=== Las Vegas Wranglers ===
The Las Vegas Wranglers finished the 2006–07 ECHL season as the league's top club with a 46–12–1–8 record. Their 106 points narrowly edged out the 105 point total of the Alaska Aces. The Wranglers swept the Phoenix RoadRunners in their first round, but were upset by the Idaho Steelheads in the second, falling four games to two.

== See also ==
- 2006–07 NHL season
