= Teeder Wynne =

Canadian ice hockey player

- Born: December 6, 1973 (age 51); Calgary, Alberta, Canada
- Height: 5 ft 11 in (180 cm)
- Weight: 180 lb (82 kg; 12 st 12 lb)
- Position: Forward
- Shot: Left
- Played for: Nybro Vikings; Asiago Hockey 1935; Sheffield Steelers; Ayr Scottish Eagles; Dundee Stars
- Playing career: 1992–2003

Teeder Wynne (born December 6, 1973) is a Canadian former ice hockey forward who was an All-American for North Dakota.

== Career ==
Wynne began attending the University of North Dakota in the fall of 1992. He saw little playing time as a freshman, providing minimal scoring for a team that won less than a third of its games. While his production improved as a sophomore, the team remained mired at the bottom of the WCHA. Dean Blais was brought in as head coach in 1994 and Wynne saw a dramatic increase to his game. He scored 30 more points as a junior, leading the team with 49 and helping the Fighting Sioux get back to .500. In his final season with North Dakota, Wynne continued his upward trend, finishing in the top 10 in the nation in scoring. UND posted its first winning season in five years while Wynne was named to the All-American team.

After graduation, Wynne went to Europe to play professionally. over the next seven seasons, Wynne played on five different teams in four countries. He typically produced at least a point per game over the course of a season and averaged two points per game three times. In 2002 he helped the Dundee Stars win the British National League championship, scoring nearly three points per game in their playoff run. Wynne played one season after the title before retiring as a player.

== Personal life ==
Teeder's older brother John played college hockey at Waterloo. The two played together in Europe from 1996 through 1999.

== Statistics ==
=== Regular season and playoffs ===
			Regular Season					Playoffs
Season	Team	League	GP	G	A	Pts	PIM	GP	G	A	Pts	PIM
1990–91	Calgary Royals U18 AAA	AMHL	—	—	—	—	—	—	—	—	—	—
1991–92	Calgary Royals	AJHL	59	36	68	104	58	—	—	—	—	—
1992–93	North Dakota	WCHA	13	2	2	4	6	—	—	—	—	—
1993–94	North Dakota	WCHA	25	8	10	18	35	—	—	—	—	—
1994–95	North Dakota	WCHA	39	22	27	49	58	—	—	—	—	—
1995–96	North Dakota	WCHA	37	26	47	73	66	—	—	—	—	—
1996–97	Nybro Vikings	Hockeytvåan	31	14	26	40	—	—	—	—	—	—
1997–98	Asiago HC	Serie A	47	57	53	110	105	—	—	—	—	—
1998–99	Sheffield Steelers	BISL	33	11	24	35	12	6	2	3	5	2
1999–00	Sheffield Steelers	BISL	40	28	31	59	18	7	2	3	5	0
2000–01	Ayr Scottish Eagles	BISL	47	14	24	38	12	7	1	2	3	10
2001–02	Dundee Stars	BNL	44	44	50	94	14	10	12	16	28	2
2002–03	Dundee Stars	BNL	36	29	50	79	16	4	1	1	2	0
NCAA totals			114	58	86	144	165	—	—	—	—	—
BISL totals			120	53	79	132	42	20	5	8	13	12
BNL totals			80	73	100	173	30	14	13	17	30	2

== Awards and honors ==
Award	Year
All-WCHA First Team	1995–96
AHCA West Second-Team All-American	1995–96
