= Marc Magliarditi =

American ice hockey player

- Born: July 9, 1976 (age 49) Niagara Falls, New York, U.S.
- Height: 5 ft 11 in (180 cm)
- Weight: 180 lb (82 kg; 12 st 12 lb)
- Position: Goaltender
- Caught: Left
- Played for: AHL; Cleveland Barons; IHL; Fort Wayne Komets; Indianapolis Ice; Detroit Vipers; Cincinnati Cyclones; ECHL; Columbus Chill; Florida Everblades; Louisiana IceGators; Richmond Renegades; Las Vegas Wranglers; UHL; Flint Generals
- NHL draft: 146th overall, 1995; Chicago Blackhawks
- Playing career: 1997–2006

Marc "Mags" Magliarditi (born July 9, 1976) is an American former professional ice hockey goaltender who most recently played for the Las Vegas Wranglers of the ECHL

== Awards and honours ==
Award	Year
All-CCHA Rookie Team	1995–96
All-CCHA First Team	1995–96
AHCA West Second-Team All-American	1995–96

Awards and achievements
Preceded by Marty Turco	CCHA Rookie of the Year; 1995–96	Succeeded by Daryl Andrews
