= 1995–96 NCAA Division I men's ice hockey season =

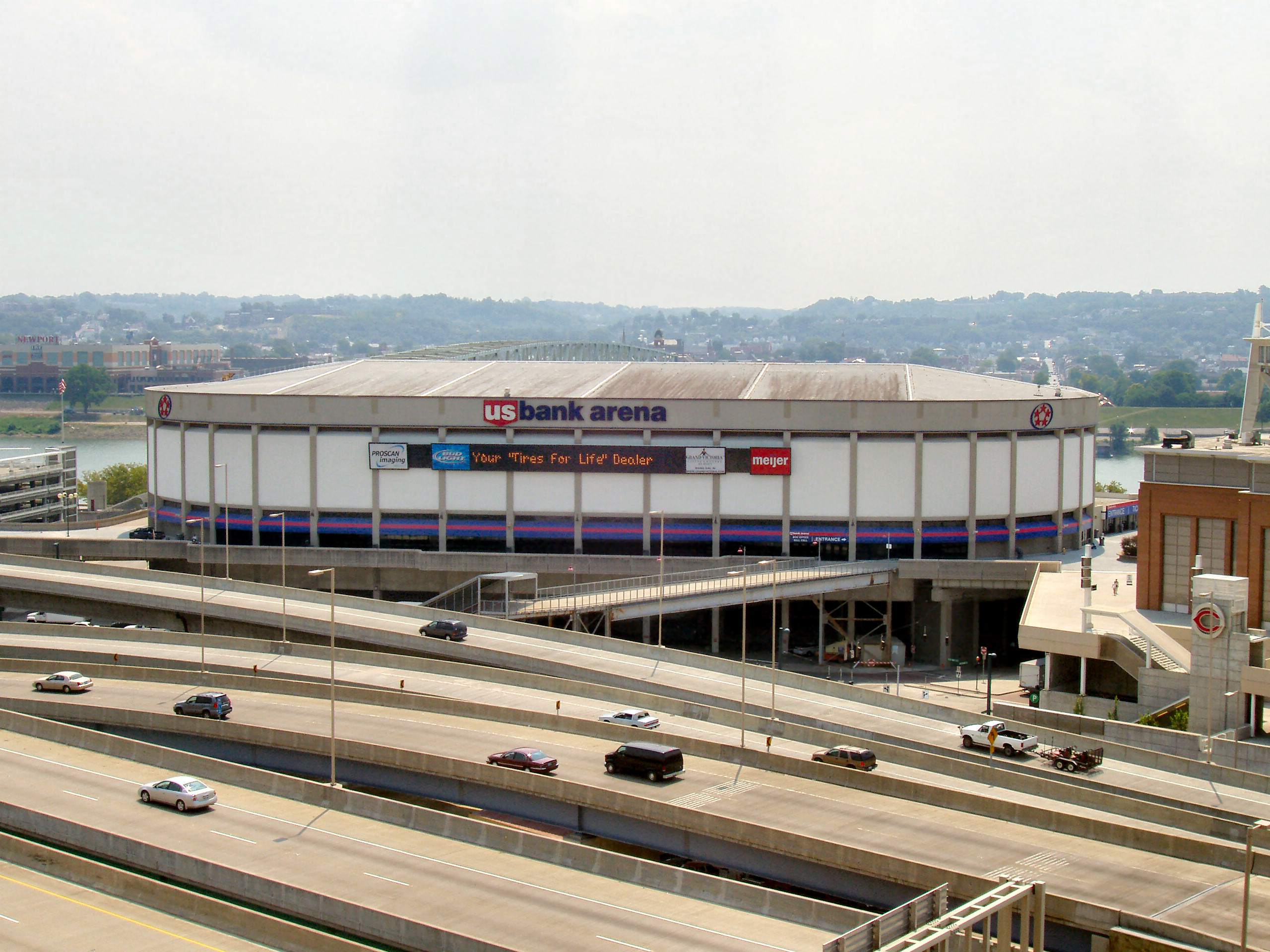
- The Riverfront Coliseum served as the host for the 1996 Frozen Four
- Duration: October 1995– March 30, 1996
- NCAA tournament: 1996
- National championship: Riverfront Coliseum; Cincinnati, Ohio
- NCAA champion: Michigan
- Hobey Baker Award: Brian Bonin (Minnesota)

The 1995–96 NCAA Division I men's ice hockey season began in October 1995 and concluded with the 1996 NCAA Division I men's ice hockey tournament's championship game on March 30, 1996, at the Riverfront Coliseum in Cincinnati, Ohio. This was the 49th season in which an NCAA ice hockey championship was held and is the 102nd year overall where an NCAA school fielded a team.

== Season Outlook ==
=== Pre-season polls ===
The top teams in the nation as ranked before the start of the season.

The WMPL poll was voted on by coaches. The WMPL poll expanded its poll to 13 teams and branded it "WMPL Baker's Dozen." The WMEB was voted on by media. The Record poll was voted on by coaches, media, and NHL scouts.

USA Today and American Hockey Magazine started a poll for the 1995-96 season. The poll was voted on by coaches and media.

This was the 3rd and last season The Record published a poll.

WMPL Poll
Rank	Team
1	Boston University (1)
2	Michigan (2)
3	Maine (1)
4	Colorado College
5	Minnesota
6	Lake Superior State
7	Vermont
8	Michigan State
9	New Hampshire
10	North Dakota
11	Bowling Green
12	Colgate
13	Minnesota Duluth

WMEB Poll
Rank	Team
1	Michigan (1)
2	Boston University (4)
3	Maine (3)
4	Colorado College (1)
5	Minnesota
6	Lake Superior State
7	Vermont
8	Colgate
9	Denver
10	Bowling Green

The Record Poll
Rank	Team
1	Boston University (20)
2	Michigan (4)
3	Maine (3)
4	Colorado College
5	Minnesota (1)
6	Lake Superior State
7	Vermont
8	Michigan State
9	New Hampshire
10	Colgate

USA Today Poll
Rank	Team
1	Boston University (9)
2	Michigan (1)
4	Colorado College
3	Maine
6	Lake Superior State
7	Vermont
8	Minnesota
9	Colgate
10	Bowling Green

== Regular season ==
=== Season tournaments ===
Tournament	Dates	Teams	Champion
Great Western Freeze–Out	October 13–15, 1995	4	Maine
Cardinal Classic	November 24–25, 1995	4	Army
College Hockey Showcase	November 24–25, 1995	4	
Governor's Cup	November 24–25, 1995	4	Maine
National Capital Tournament	November 24–25, 1995	4	Princeton
JCPenney Classic	December 22–23, 1995	4	Sweden Junior Team
UMass International Holiday Classic	December 22–23, 1995	4	Finland Junior Team
Denver Cup	December 27–28, 1995	4	Denver
Chill Out at Saskatoon	December 27–29, 1995	4	
Badger Showdown	December 28–29, 1995	4	Boston University
Great Lakes Invitational	December 29–30, 1995	4	Michigan
Mariucci Classic	December 29–30, 1995	4	Minnesota
Rensselaer Holiday Tournament	December 29–30, 1995	4	Clarkson
Sheraton/USAir Hockey Classic	December 29–30, 1995	4	Minnesota–Duluth
Syracuse Invitational	December 29–30, 1995	4	Western Michigan
Beanpot	February 5,12, 1996	4	Boston University

=== Standings ===
1995–96 Central Collegiate Hockey Association standings
	Conference							Overall					
	GP	W	L	T	PTS	GF	GA	GP	W	L	T	GF	GA
Lake Superior State†	30	22	6	2	46	136	89	40	30	8	2	184	109
Michigan†*	30	22	6	2	46	178	71	43	34	7	2	239	93
Michigan State	30	22	7	1	45	115	86	42	28	13	1	154	129
Western Michigan	30	21	6	3	45	125	71	41	27	11	3	172	111
Bowling Green	30	18	11	1	37	126	106	41	26	14	1	172	138
Ferris State	30	10	17	3	23	101	120	38	13	22	3	126	196
Miami	30	9	17	4	22	99	142	36	10	22	4	119	168
Ohio State	30	8	17	5	21	82	105	34	10	19	5	94	118
Alaska-Fairbanks	30	8	22	0	16	101	142	34	10	23	1	114	152
Notre Dame	30	6	20	4	16	87	136	36	9	23	4	110	159
Illinois-Chicago	30	6	23	1	13	73	155	36	9	24	3	97	177
Championship: Michigan † indicates conference regular season champion * indicates conference tournament champion Final rankings: USA Today/American Hockey Magazine Coaches Poll Top 10 Poll

1995–96 ECAC Hockey standings
	Conference							Overall					
	GP	W	L	T	PTS	GF	GA	GP	W	L	T	GF	GA
Vermont†	22	17	2	3	37	86	45	38	27	7	4	149	91
Clarkson	22	16	4	2	34	97	59	38	25	10	3	152	105
St. Lawrence	22	15	4	3	33	107	74	35	20	12	3	144	132
Cornell*	22	14	4	4	31	94	66	34	21	9	4	139	108
Colgate	22	13	5	4	30	95	60	34	17	13	4	136	117
Harvard	22	9	12	1	19	76	71	34	13	20	1	111	114
Brown	22	5	11	6	16	60	81	32	9	15	8	99	124
Rensselaer	22	7	13	2	16	63	77	35	10	22	3	116	131
Dartmouth	22	6	14	2	14	57	88	30	7	20	3	83	130
Princeton	22	5	14	2	13	59	81	30	7	19	4	78	117
Union	22	4	15	3	11	55	83	30	7	19	4	83	100
Yale	22	4	17	1	9	53	109	31	7	23	1	80	145
Championship: Cornell † indicates conference regular season champion * indicates conference tournament champion (Whitelaw Cup); Final rankings: USA Today/American Hockey Magazine Coaches Poll Top 10 Poll

1995–96 Hockey East standings
	Conference								Overall					
	GP	W	L	T	SW	PTS	GF	GA	GP	W	L	T	GF	GA
Boston University†	24	17	5	2	1	90	132	79	40	30	7	3	236	125
Massachusetts–Lowell	24	16	6	2	1	85	114	96	40	26	10	4	200	156
Maine	24	14	6	4	2	80	102	75	39	26	9	4	164	112
Providence*	24	12	9	3	0	66	83	83	39	21	15	3	142	135
Boston College	24	12	10	2	1	65	89	102	36	16	17	3	126	147
New Hampshire	24	8	12	4	1	49	99	103	34	12	18	4	139	150
Northeastern	24	6	13	5	5	45	79	93	36	10	21	5	118	145
Massachusetts	24	4	16	6	4	36	81	120	35	10	19	6	119	161
Merrimack	24	4	18	2	0	24	83	111	34	10	19	5	123	130
Championship: Providence † indicates conference regular season champion * indicates conference tournament champion Final rankings: USA Today/American Hockey Magazine Coaches Poll Top 10 Poll

1995–96 NCAA Division I Independent ice hockey standings
	Conference							Overall					
	GP	W	L	T	PTS	GF	GA	GP	W	L	T	GF	GA
Air Force	0	0	0	0	-	-	-	33	4	24	5	83	166
Army	0	0	0	0	-	-	-	34	24	9	1	164	81
Final rankings: USA Today/American Hockey Magazine Coaches Poll Top 10 Poll

1995–96 Western Collegiate Hockey Association standings
	Conference							Overall					
	GP	W	L	T	PTS	GF	GA	GP	W	L	T	GF	GA
Colorado College†	32	26	2	4	56	178	78	42	33	5	4	225	104
Minnesota*	32	21	9	2	44	155	95	42	30	10	2	204	121
Denver	32	17	12	3	37	120	112	39	22	14	3	149	131
Minnesota-Duluth	32	16	15	1	33	116	109	38	20	17	1	139	125
North Dakota	32	16	15	1	33	127	126	38	19	18	1	162	155
Wisconsin	32	14	15	3	31	110	123	40	17	20	3	145	160
Michigan Tech	32	12	14	6	30	108	118	42	18	18	6	145	159
St. Cloud State	32	10	18	4	24	106	132	39	13	22	4	135	153
Alaska-Anchorage	32	8	20	5	20	86	130	37	9	23	5	103	153
Northern Michigan	32	5	25	2	12	64	147	39	7	30	2	83	174
Championship: Minnesota † indicates conference regular season champion * indicates conference tournament champion Final rankings: USA Today/USA Hockey Magazine Top 10 Poll

=== Final regular season polls ===
The WMPL, WMEB, and The Record polls were released before the conference tournaments. The USA Today poll was released before the conference tournament finals.

WMPL Coaches Poll
Ranking	Team
1	Colorado College (9)
2	Boston University (1)
3	Lake Superior State
4	Michigan State
5	Western Michigan
6	Michigan
7	Minnesota
8	Vermont
9	Massachusetts Lowell
10	Maine

WMEB Media Poll
Ranking	Team
1	Colorado College (11)
2	Boston University
3	Lake Superior State
4	Michigan
5	Minnesota
6	Massachusetts Lowell
7	Michigan State
8	Western Michigan
9	Vermont
10	Maine
(tie)	Denver

The Record Poll
Ranking	Team
1	Colorado College (29)
2	Boston University
3	Lake Superior State
4	Michigan
5	Minnesota
6	Michigan State
7	Western Michigan
8	Massachusetts Lowell
9	Vermont
10	Maine

USA Today / American Hockey Magazine Poll
Ranking	Team
1	Colorado College (8)
2	Michigan (2)
3	Boston University
4	Lake Superior State
5	Minnesota
6	Vermont
7	Massachusetts Lowell
8	Michigan State
9	Clarkson
10	Cornell

== 1996 NCAA tournament ==
Regional Quarterfinals; March 22–23, 1996
E1	Boston University	–
–	bye	–
East Regional
E4	Western Michigan	1
E5	Clarkson	6
W2	Michigan	–
–	bye	–
West Regional
W3	Minnesota	5
W6	Providence	1
W1	Colorado College	–
–	bye	–
West Regional
W4	Massachusetts-Lowell	6
W5	Michigan State	2
E2	Vermont	–
–	bye	–
East Regional
E3	Lake Superior State	5
E6	Cornell	4

Regional semifinals March 23–24, 1996
E1	Boston University	3
E5	Clarkson	2
W2	Michigan	4
W3	Minnesota	3
W1	Colorado College	5
W4	Massachusetts-Lowell	3
E2	Vermont	2
E3	Lake Superior State	1

Frozen Four; March 28, 1996
E1	Boston University	0
W2	Michigan	4
W1	Colorado College	4**
E2	Vermont	3

National championship March 30, 1996
W2	Michigan	3*
W1	Colorado College	2

Note: * denotes overtime period(s)

== Player stats ==
=== Scoring leaders ===
The following players led the league in points at the conclusion of the season.

GP = Games played; G = Goals; A = Assists; Pts = Points; PIM = Penalty minutes

Player	Class	Team	GP	G	A	Pts	PIM
Martin St. Louis	Junior	Vermont	35	29	56	85	38
Éric Perrin	Junior	Vermont	38	29	56	85	38
Brian Bonin	Senior	Minnesota	42	34	47	81	30
Teeder Wynne	Senior	North Dakota	37	26	47	73	66
Todd White	Junior	Clarkson	38	29	43	72	36
Brendan Morrison	Junior	Michigan	35	28	44	72	41
Peter Geronazzo	Senior	Colorado College	42	36	33	69	81
Jay Pandolfo	Senior	Boston University	39	38	29	67	6
Chris Drury	Sophomore	Boston University	37	35	32	67	46
Mike Crowley	Sophomore	Minnesota	42	17	46	63	28

=== Leading goaltenders ===
The following goaltenders led the league in goals against average at the end of the regular season while playing at least 33% of their team's total minutes.

GP = Games played; Min = Minutes played; W = Wins; L = Losses; OT = Overtime/shootout losses; GA = Goals against; SO = Shutouts; SV% = Save percentage; GAA = Goals against average

Player	Class	Team	GP	Min	W	L	OT	GA	SO	SV%	GAA
Judd Lambert	Junior	Colorado College	19	1060	16	1	2	42	1	.912	2.14
Marty Turco	Sophomore	Michigan	42	2334	34	7	1	84	4	.896	2.16
Daryl Chamberlain	Sophomore	Army	33	1830	23	9	1	70	9	.907	2.30
Tim Thomas	Junior	Vermont	37	2254	26	7	4	88	3	.924	2.34
Jason Elliott	Sophomore	Cornell	19	971	12	2	1	38	2	.923	2.35
John Grahame	Sophomore	Lake Superior State	29	1658	21	4	2	67	2	.904	2.42
Marc Magliarditi	Freshman	Western Michigan	36	2110	23	11	2	91	5	.910	2.59
Jeff Moen	Senior	Minnesota	21	1227	15	3	2	53	3	.891	2.59
Ryan Bach	Senior	Colorado College	23	1390	17	4	2	62	2	.895	2.68
Dan Murphy	Sophomore	Clarkson	38	2224	25	10	3	100	1	.912	2.70

== Awards ==
=== NCAA ===
Award		Recipient
Hobey Baker Memorial Award		Brian Bonin, Minnesota
Spencer T. Penrose Award		Bruce Crowder, Massachusetts-Lowell
Most Outstanding Player in NCAA Tournament		Brendan Morrison, Michigan
AHCA All-American Teams
East First Team	Position	West First Team
Tim Thomas, Vermont	G	Ryan Bach, Colorado College
Jeff Tory, Maine	D	Keith Aldridge, Lake Superior State
Dan McGillis, Northeastern	D	Mike Crowley, Minnesota
Jay Pandolfo, Boston University	F	Peter Geronazzo, Colorado College
Éric Perrin, Vermont	F	Brendan Morrison, Michigan
Martin St. Louis, Vermont	F	Brian Bonin, Minnesota
East Second Team	Position	West Second Team
Dan Murphy, Clarkson	G	Marc Magliarditi, Western Michigan
Jon Coleman, Boston University	D	Andy Roach, Ferris State
Brad Dexter, Colgate	D	Dan Trebil, Minnesota
Chris Drury, Boston University	F	Sean Tallaire, Lake Superior State
Todd White, Clarkson	F	Kevin Hilton, Michigan
Burke Murphy, St. Lawrence	F	Teeder Wynne, North Dakota

=== CCHA ===
Awards		Recipient
Player of the Year		Brendan Morrison, Michigan
Best Defensive Forward		Bates Battaglia, Lake Superior State
Best Defensive Defenseman		Mike Matteucci, Lake Superior State
Best Offensive Defenseman		Keith Aldridge, Lake Superior State
Rookie of the Year		Marc Magliarditi, Western Michigan
Coach of the Year		Bill Wilkinson, Western Michigan
Terry Flanagan Memorial Award		Jon Gaskins, Michigan State
Most Valuable Player in Tournament		John Madden, Michigan
All-CCHA Teams
First Team	Position	Second Team
Marc Magliarditi, Western Michigan	G	Tom Sakey, Ohio State
Keith Aldridge, Lake Superior State	D	Steven Halko, Michigan
Andy Roach, Ferris State	D	Kelly Perrault, Bowling Green
Brendan Morrison, Michigan	F	Jason Botterill, Michigan
Sean Tallaire, Lake Superior State	F	Anson Carter, Michigan State
Kevin Hilton, Michigan	F	Jeremy Brown, Western Michigan
Rookie Team	Position	
Marc Magliarditi, Western Michigan	G	
Joe Corvo, Western Michigan	D	
Chris Bogas, Michigan State	D	
Tony Kolozsy, Illinois-Chicago	F	
Mike York, Michigan State	F	
Randy Robitaille, Miami	F	

=== ECAC ===
Award		Recipient
Player of the Year		Éric Perrin, Vermont
Rookie of the Year		Kyle Knopp, Cornell
Coach of the Year		Joe Marsh, St. Lawrence
Best Defensive Defenseman		Jeff Kungle, St. Lawrence
Best Defensive Forward		Brad Chartrand, Cornell
Ken Dryden Award		Tim Thomas, Vermont
Most Outstanding Player in Tournament		Jason Elliott, Cornell
All-ECAC Hockey Teams
First Team	Position	Second Team
Tim Thomas, Vermont	G	Dan Brenzavich, Colgate
Steve Wilson, Cornell	D	Jeff Kungle, St. Lawrence
Brad Dexter, Colgate	D	Patrick Rochon, Rensselaer
Éric Perrin, Vermont	F	Mike Harder, Colgate
Martin St. Louis, Vermont	F	Chris DeProfio, Colgate
Burke Murphy, St. Lawrence	F	Todd White, Clarkson
Rookie Team	Position	
Leeor Shtrom, Union	G	
Jan Kloboucek, Vermont	D	
Mikko Ollila, Clarkson	D	
John Poapst, St. Lawrence	D	
Ben Storey, Harvard	D	
Craig Adams, Harvard	F	
Matt Garver, Rensselaer	F	
Kyle Knopp, Cornell	F	
Craig MacDonald, Harvard	F	
Brent Ozarowski, Union	F	
Alain St. Hilaire, Rensselaer	F	

=== Hockey East ===
Award		Recipient
Player of the Year		Jay Pandolfo, Boston University
Rookie of the Year		Marty Reasoner, Boston College
Bob Kullen Coach of the Year Award		Bruce Crowder, Massachusetts-Lowell
Len Ceglarski Sportsmanship Award		Todd Hall, New Hampshire
William Flynn Tournament Most Valuable Player		Joe Hulbig, Providence
All-Hockey East Teams
All Stars*	Position	All Stars*
Blair Allison, Maine	G	Dan Dennis, Providence
Todd Hall, New Hampshire	D	Jon Coleman, Boston University
Jeff Tory, Maine	D	Dan McGillis, Northeastern
Chris Drury, Boston University	F	Tim Lovell, Maine
David Hymovitz, Boston College	F	Mark Mowers, New Hampshire
Chris Sbrocca, Massachusetts-Lowell	F	Jay Pandolfo, Boston University
Rookie Team	Position	
Michel Larocque, Boston University	G	
Brett Clark, Maine	D	
Darrel Scoville, Merrimack	D	
Marty Reasoner, Boston College	F	
Derek Bekar, New Hampshire	F	
Steve Kariya, Maine	F	

* No Distinction was made between First- and Second-Team All-Stars

=== WCHA ===
Award		Recipient
Player of the Year		Brian Bonin, Minnesota
Defensive Player of the Year		Eric Rud, Colorado College
Rookie of the Year		Brian Swanson, Colorado College
Student-Athlete of the Year		Dan Trebil, Minnesota
Coach of the Year		Don Lucia, Colorado College
Most Valuable Player in Tournament		Brian Bonin, Minnesota
All-WCHA Teams
First Team	Position	Second Team
Ryan Bach, Colorado College	G	Judd Lambert, Colorado College
Mike Crowley, Minnesota	D	Scott Swanson, Colorado College
Nick Naumenko, North Dakota	D	Dan Trebil, Minnesota
Brian Bonin, Minnesota	F	Brian Swanson, Colorado College
Peter Geronazzo, Colorado College	F	Colin Schmidt, Colorado College
Teeder Wynne, North Dakota	F	Antti Laaksonen, Denver
Third Team	Position	Rookie Team
Teras Lendzyk, Minnesota-Duluth	G	Steve DeBus, Minnesota
Taj Melson, St. Cloud State	D	Scott Swanson, Colorado College
Eric Rud, Colorado College	D	Darrin Bradley, Alaska-Anchorage
Jay McNeill, Colorado College	F	Brian Swanson, Colorado College
David Vallieres, Alaska-Anchorage	F	Matt Cullen, St. Cloud State
Mike Peluso, Minnesota-Duluth	F	Erik Rasmussen, Minnesota

== 1996 NHL entry draft ==
Round	Pick	Player	College	Conference	NHL team
1	7	Erik Rasmussen	Minnesota	WCHA	Buffalo Sabres
1	14	Marty Reasoner	Boston College	Hockey East	St. Louis Blues
1	25	Peter Ratchuk ^{†}	Bowling Green	CCHA	Colorado Avalanche
2	29	Dan LaCouture ^{†}	Boston University	Hockey East	New York Islanders
2	35	Matt Cullen	St. Cloud State	WCHA	Mighty Ducks of Anaheim
2	41	Josh DeWolf ^{†}	St. Cloud State	WCHA	New Jersey Devils
3	59	Tom Poti	Boston University	Hockey East	Edmonton Oilers
3	74	David Weninger	Michigan Tech	WCHA	Washington Capitals
3	79	Mark Parrish	St. Cloud State	WCHA	Colorado Avalanche
4	86	Jason Sessa	Lake Superior State	CCHA	Toronto Maple Leafs
4	88	Craig MacDonald	Harvard	ECAC Hockey	Hartford Whalers
4	98	Ben Storey	Harvard	ECAC Hockey	Colorado Avalanche
4	101	Josh MacNevin ^{†}	Providence	Hockey East	New Jersey Devils
5	109	Andrew Berenzweig	Michigan	CCHA	New York Islanders
5	114	Brian Urick ^{†}	Notre Dame	CCHA	Edmonton Oilers
5	117	Brendan Buckley	Boston College	Hockey East	Mighty Ducks of Anaheim
6	137	Michael Larocque	Boston University	Hockey East	Ottawa Senators
6	145	Sean Ritchlin	Michigan	CCHA	New Jersey Devils
6	147	Nolan McDonald	Vermont	ECAC Hockey	Vancouver Canucks
6	148	Chris Bogas	Michigan State	CCHA	Toronto Maple Leafs
6	153	A. J. Van Bruggen	Northern Michigan	WCHA	Washington Capitals
6	154	Brett Clark	Maine	Hockey East	Montreal Canadiens
6	156	Gaetan Poirier	Merrimack	Hockey East	Florida Panthers
6	159	Stephen Wagner ^{†}	Denver	WCHA	St. Louis Blues
7	165	J. R. Prestifilippo ^{†}	Harvard	ECAC Hockey	New York Islanders
7	167	Dan Hinote	Army	Independent	Colorado Avalanche
7	170	Brandon Lafrance	Ohio State	CCHA	Edmonton Oilers
7	173	Daryl Andrews ^{†}	Western Michigan	CCHA	New Jersey Devils
7	178	Reggie Berg	Minnesota	WCHA	Toronto Maple Leafs
7	180	Mike Anderson	Minnesota	WCHA	Chicago Blackhawks
7	185	Jeff Dessner ^{†}	Wisconsin	WCHA	New York Rangers
7	186	Éric Meloche ^{†}	Ohio State	CCHA	Pittsburgh Penguins
8	195	Fernando Pisani ^{†}	Providence	Hockey East	Edmonton Oilers
8	199	Willie Mitchell ^{†}	Clarkson	ECAC Hockey	New Jersey Devils
8	200	Nick Lent ^{†}	Providence	Hockey East	Phoenix Coyotes
8	201	Jeff Scissons ^{†}	Minnesota–Duluth	WCHA	Vancouver Canucks
8	203	Tony Hutchins ^{†}	Boston College	Hockey East	St. Louis Blues
8	208	Bob Prier	St. Lawrence	ECAC Hockey	Boston Bruins
8	214	Matt Scorsune ^{†}	Harvard	ECAC Hockey	Colorado Avalanche
9	223	Craig Adams	Harvard	ECAC Hockey	Hartford Whalers
9	240	Justin Clark	Michigan	CCHA	Colorado Avalanche

† incoming freshman

== See also ==
- 1995–96 NCAA Division II men's ice hockey season
- 1995–96 NCAA Division III men's ice hockey season
