= Ben Storey =

Canadian ice hockey player

- Born: June 22, 1977 (age 49) Ottawa, Ontario, Canada
- Height: 6 ft 2 in (188 cm)
- Weight: 180 lb (82 kg; 12 st 12 lb)
- Position: Defenceman
- Shot: Left
- Played for: Hershey Bears; EK Zell am See; Houston Aeros; SERC Wild Wings; Essen Mosquitoes; Graz 99ers EHC Black Wings Linz; Newcastle Vipers
- NHL draft: 98th overall, 1996; Colorado Avalanche
- Playing career: 1999–2008

Ben Storey (born June 22, 1977) is a Canadian former professional ice hockey player.

== Playing career ==
Storey was drafted 98th overall by the Colorado Avalanche in the 1996 NHL entry draft from Harvard University. He spent two seasons with their American Hockey League affiliate the Hershey Bears but never played in the National Hockey League. In 2001, he moved to the Austrian Hockey League with EK Zell am See for one season before returning to North America in the ECHL for the Lexington Men O' War and the Louisiana IceGators as well as brief spells for the AHL's Utah Grizzlies and the Houston Aeros.

Storey returned to Europe in 2004 with spells in the German 2nd Bundesliga with the SERC Wild Wings and the Essen Mosquitoes as well as a second spell in Austria with Graz 99ers and EHC Black Wings Linz. In 2007, Storey signed with British Elite Ice Hockey League team the Newcastle Vipers. In May 2008, Storey rejected a new contract with the Vipers to remain in North America where he seemingly retired from hockey.

== Career statistics ==
			Regular season					Playoffs
Season	Team	League	GP	G	A	Pts	PIM	GP	G	A	Pts	PIM
1995–96	Harvard University	ECAC	33	2	11	13	44	—	—	—	—	—
1996–97	Harvard University	ECAC	25	0	6	6	40	—	—	—	—	—
1997–98	Harvard University	ECAC	33	9	16	25	56	—	—	—	—	—
1998–99	Harvard University	ECAC	23	4	11	15	30	—	—	—	—	—
1998–99	Hershey Bears	AHL	5	0	0	0	0	—	—	—	—	—
1999–2000	Hershey Bears	AHL	65	6	18	24	69	14	2	2	4	8
2000–01	Hershey Bears	AHL	58	2	12	14	71	4	1	3	4	2
2001–02	EK Zell am See	EBEL	30	5	16	21	54	—	—	—	—	—
2002–03	Lexington Men O' War	ECHL	62	18	27	45	105	3	0	1	1	4
2002–03	Utah Grizzlies	AHL	—	—	—	—	—	1	0	0	0	6
2003–04	Louisiana IceGators	ECHL	63	19	39	58	124	9	1	6	7	4
2003–04	Houston Aeros	AHL	7	0	2	2	2	—	—	—	—	—
2004–05	SERC Wild Wings	2.GBun	52	19	25	44	54	6	3	3	6	10
2005–06	Essen Mosquitoes	2.GBun	18	5	10	15	46	—	—	—	—	—
2005–06	Graz 99ers	EBEL	22	8	14	22	108	—	—	—	—	—
2006–07	EHC Linz	EBEL	48	21	18	39	139	3	1	2	3	8
2007–08	Newcastle Vipers	EIHL	54	13	25	38	109	3	2	0	2	2
AHL totals			135	8	32	40	142	19	3	5	8	16

== Awards and honors ==
Award	Year
All-ECAC Hockey Rookie Team	1995–96
