= Tomi Mäki =

Finnish professional ice hockey forward (born 1983)

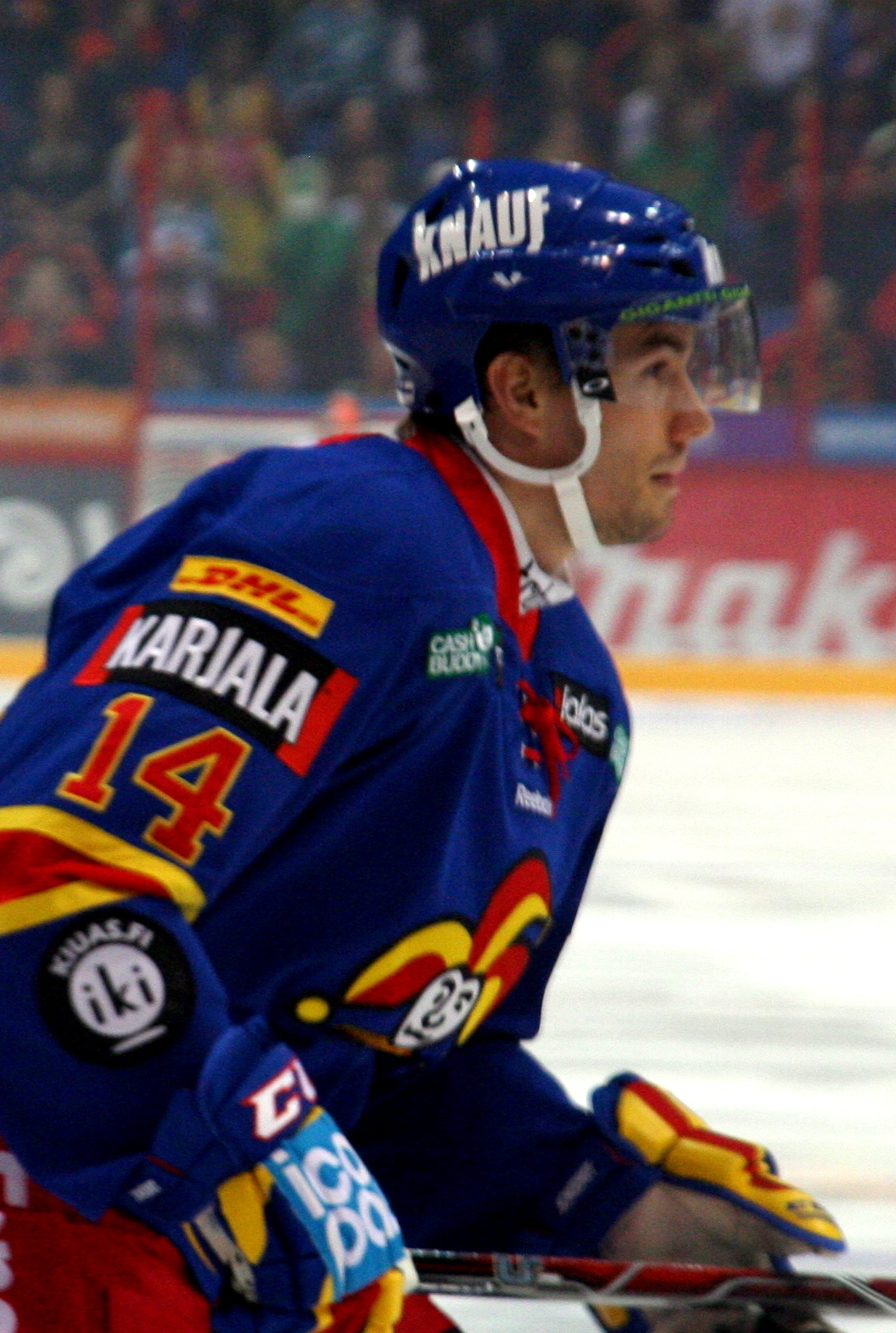
- Born: August 19, 1983 (age 42) Helsinki, Finland
- Height: 5 ft 11 in (180 cm)
- Weight: 192 lb (87 kg; 13 st 10 lb)
- Position: Centre
- Shot: Left
- team Former teams: Free Agent; Jokerit; Calgary Flames
- NHL draft: 108th overall, 2001; Calgary Flames
- Playing career: 2001–2019

Tomi Mäki (born August 19, 1983) is a Finnish professional ice hockey forward who is currently an unrestricted free agent. He most recently played for Jokerit in the Kontinental Hockey League (KHL).

== Playing career ==
Mäki was drafted by the Calgary Flames as their fourth-round pick, 108th overall, in the 2001 NHL entry draft. Before being drafted he played four seasons with Jokerit in the Finnish SM-liiga.

Mäki then spent three years in the Flames system with the Omaha Ak-Sar-Ben Knights and the Quad City Flames of the AHL. During this time Mäki made his first and only NHL appearance with the Calgary Flames on December 12, 2006, against the Minnesota Wild going scoreless.

On April 21, 2008, Mäki returned to his old club, signing for Jokerit of the then SM-Liiga. In remaining with Jokerit through their transition to the KHL, Mäki as the club's longest-tenured player, extended his contract following the 2017–18 season, agreeing to a one-year deal on April 9, 2018.

== Career statistics ==
=== Regular season and playoffs ===
| | | | Regular season | | | | | Playoffs |
| Season | Team | League | GP | G | A | Pts | PIM | GP | G | A | Pts | PIM |
|---|---|---|---|---|---|---|---|---|---|---|---|---|
| 2000–01 | Jokerit | FIN U18 | 10 | 4 | 9 | 13 | 4 | — | — | — | — | — |
| 2000–01 | Jokerit | FIN U20 | 39 | 7 | 8 | 15 | 10 | 2 | 0 | 0 | 0 | 2 |
| 2001–02 | Jokerit | FIN U20 | 29 | 12 | 13 | 25 | 12 | — | — | — | — | — |
| 2001–02 | Jokerit | SM-l | 8 | 0 | 1 | 1 | 2 | — | — | — | — | — |
| 2001–02 | Kiekko–Vantaa | Mestis | 5 | 0 | 0 | 0 | 0 | — | — | — | — | — |
| 2002–03 | Jokerit | FIN U20 | 14 | 4 | 4 | 8 | 12 | 11 | 3 | 3 | 6 | 4 |
| 2002–03 | Jokerit | SM-l | 18 | 2 | 2 | 4 | 4 | 1 | 0 | 0 | 0 | 0 |
| 2002–03 | Kiekko–Vantaa | Mestis | 3 | 1 | 0 | 1 | 4 | — | — | — | — | — |
| 2003–04 | Jokerit | SM-l | 50 | 5 | 5 | 10 | 14 | 8 | 0 | 0 | 0 | 0 |
| 2004–05 | Jokerit | SM-l | 51 | 1 | 4 | 5 | 14 | 12 | 1 | 1 | 2 | 2 |
| 2005–06 | Omaha Ak–Sar–Ben Knights | AHL | 80 | 12 | 17 | 29 | 33 | — | — | — | — | — |
| 2006–07 | Omaha Ak–Sar–Ben Knights | AHL | 67 | 4 | 11 | 15 | 20 | 6 | 1 | 1 | 2 | 2 |
| 2006–07 | Calgary Flames | NHL | 1 | 0 | 0 | 0 | 0 | — | — | — | — | — |
| 2007–08 | Quad City Flames | AHL | 78 | 8 | 5 | 13 | 38 | — | — | — | — | — |
| 2008–09 | Jokerit | SM-l | 57 | 7 | 9 | 16 | 49 | 5 | 0 | 0 | 0 | 6 |
| 2009–10 | Jokerit | SM-l | 52 | 4 | 6 | 10 | 51 | 3 | 0 | 0 | 0 | 4 |
| 2010–11 | Jokerit | SM-l | 60 | 12 | 5 | 17 | 42 | 5 | 1 | 1 | 2 | 4 |
| 2011–12 | Jokerit | SM-l | 60 | 8 | 13 | 21 | 32 | 10 | 1 | 2 | 3 | 0 |
| 2012–13 | Jokerit | SM-l | 46 | 2 | 5 | 7 | 39 | 6 | 1 | 2 | 3 | 0 |
| 2013–14 | Jokerit | Liiga | 57 | 4 | 2 | 6 | 38 | 2 | 0 | 1 | 1 | 0 |
| 2014–15 | Jokerit | KHL | 52 | 4 | 3 | 7 | 16 | 10 | 2 | 0 | 2 | 2 |
| 2015–16 | Jokerit | KHL | 29 | 2 | 1 | 3 | 12 | 6 | 0 | 0 | 0 | 0 |
| 2016–17 | Jokerit | KHL | 41 | 2 | 4 | 6 | 10 | — | — | — | — | — |
| 2017–18 | Jokerit | KHL | 23 | 0 | 3 | 3 | 8 | 1 | 0 | 0 | 0 | 0 |
| 2018–19 | Jokerit | KHL | 24 | 2 | 4 | 6 | 4 | — | — | — | — | — |
| Liiga totals | | | 459 | 45 | 52 | 97 | 285 | 52 | 4 | 7 | 11 | 16 |
| NHL totals | | | 1 | 0 | 0 | 0 | 0 | — | — | — | — | — |
| KHL totals | | | 169 | 10 | 15 | 25 | 50 | 17 | 2 | 0 | 2 | 2 |

=== International ===
| Year | Team | Event | Result | GP | G | A | Pts | PIM |
|---|---|---|---|---|---|---|---|---|
| 2001 | Finland | WJC18 | 3rd place, bronze medalist(s) | 6 | 1 | 0 | 1 | 8 |
| 2002 | Finland | WJC | 3rd place, bronze medalist(s) | 7 | 1 | 0 | 1 | 2 |
| 2003 | Finland | WJC | 3rd place, bronze medalist(s) | 7 | 2 | 2 | 4 | 27 |
| Junior totals | | | | 20 | 4 | 2 | 6 | 37 |
