= Ryan Bach =

Canadian ice hockey player (born 1973)

- Born: October 21, 1973 (age 52) Sherwood Park, Alberta, Canada
- Height: 6 ft 1 in (185 cm)
- Weight: 185 lb (84 kg; 13 st 3 lb)
- Position: Goaltender
- Caught: Left
- Played for: Los Angeles Kings; Sheffield Steelers; Belfast Giants
- NHL draft: 262nd overall, 1992; Detroit Red Wings
- Playing career: 1996–2004

Ryan Bach (born October 21, 1973) is a Canadian former professional hockey goaltender.

== Playing career ==
Bach played three games in the National Hockey League for the Los Angeles Kings during the 1998–99 season. The rest of his career, which lasted from 1996 to 2004, was mainly spent in the minor leagues. Bach was drafted by the Detroit Red Wings in the 11th round of the 1992 NHL entry draft. He played college hockey at Colorado College before turning pro in 1996.

Following his 8-year professional playing career, Bach remained with his last club the Colorado Eagles in a goaltending coach and broadcasting capacity. Through his 16th year on the staff with the Eagles, Bach was promoted as team president and alternate governor on January 21, 2022.He is the fourth President and Alternate Governor in team history.

== Personal ==
In addition to his nearly four decades of playing and coaching experience, Bach as a Sherwood Park, Alberta native also owned and managed the RE/MAX Eagle Rock real estate brokerage, which he began in 2011. He and his family currently reside in Windsor, Colorado, where he has lived for the past 20 years.

== Career statistics ==
			Regular season									Playoffs
Season	Team	League	GP	W	L	T	MIN	GA	SO	GAA	SV%	GP	W	L	MIN	GA	SO	GAA	SV%
1990–91	Notre Dame Hounds	SJHL	1	—	—	—	—	—	—	60.00	—	—	—	—	—	—	—	—	—
1991–92	Notre Dame Hounds	SJHL	33	16	11	6	1062	124	0	4.00	—	—	—	—	—	—	—	—	—
1992–93	Colorado College	WCHA	4	1	3	0	239	11	0	2.76	—	—	—	—	—	—	—	—	—
1993–94	Colorado College	WCHA	30	17	7	5	1733	105	0	3.64	.872	—	—	—	—	—	—	—	—
1994–95	Colorado College	WCHA	27	18	5	1	1522	83	0	3.27	—	—	—	—	—	—	—	—	—
1995–96	Colorado College	WCHA	23	17	4	2	1390	62	2	2.68	.896	—	—	—	—	—	—	—	—
1996–97	Utica Blizzard	CoHL	2	0	1	1	119	8	0	4.03	.901	—	—	—	—	—	—	—	—
1996–97	Toledo Storm	ECHL	20	5	11	3	1168	74	0	3.80	.882	—	—	—	—	—	—	—	—
1996–97	Adirondack Red Wings	AHL	13	2	3	1	451	29	0	3.86	.888	1	0	0	46	3	0	3.92	.875
1997–98	Houston Aeros	IHL	43	26	9	6	2452	95	5	2.32	.914	—	—	—	—	—	—	—	—
1998–99	Los Angeles Kings	NHL	3	0	3	0	108	8	0	4.45	.879	—	—	—	—	—	—	—	—
1998–99	Utah Grizzlies	IHL	4	2	1	0	197	9	0	2.74	.913	—	—	—	—	—	—	—	—
1998–99	Long Beach Ice Dogs	IHL	27	10	9	5	1491	74	1	2.98	.893	3	0	2	152	7	0	2.76	.920
1999–00	Louisville Panthers	AHL	11	4	4	1	603	33	0	3.28	.896	—	—	—	—	—	—	—	—
1999–00	Wilkes-Barre/Scranton Penguins	AHL	28	8	18	2	1590	100	0	3.77	.891	—	—	—	—	—	—	—	—
1999–00	Kansas City Blades	IHL	6	3	3	0	358	19	0	3.18	.881	—	—	—	—	—	—	—	—
2000–01	Louisville Panthers	AHL	30	6	13	1	1297	66	1	3.05	.911	—	—	—	—	—	—	—	—
2001–02	Sheffield Steelers	BISL	27	—	—	—	1554	80	0	3.09	.889	8	6	1	485	12	2	1.48	.954
2002–03	Belfast Giants	BISL	24	—	—	—	1436	57	0	2.38	.921	15	—	—	—	—	—	1.97	.940
2003–04	Colorado Eagles	CHL	53	33	15	5	3201	124	6	2.32	.914	4	1	3	238	10	0	2.53	.906
NHL totals			3	0	3	0	108	8	0	4.45	.879	—	—	—	—	—	—	—	—

== Awards and honours ==
Award	Year
College
All-WCHA First Team	1994–95
AHCA West Second-Team All-American	1994–95
All-WCHA First Team	1995–96
AHCA West First-Team All-American	1995–96
