= Kevin Hilton =

American ice hockey player (born 1975)

- Born: January 5, 1975 (age 51) Trenton, Michigan, USA
- Height: 5 ft 11 in (180 cm)
- Weight: 180 lb (82 kg; 12 st 12 lb)
- Position: Center
- Shot: Left
- Played for: Mississippi Sea Wolves; Quebec Rafales; Worcester IceCats; Mobile Mysticks; Orlando Solar Bears; Alexandria Warthogs; Springfield Falcons; Charlotte Checkers; Hartford Wolf Pack
- NHL draft: 74th overall, 1993; Detroit Red Wings
- Playing career: 1992–2002

Kevin Hilton is an American former ice hockey center who was an All-American for Michigan.

== Career ==
Hilton joined the ice hockey program at Michigan right out of high school, joining a team that was in the middle of a run as one of the top teams in the nation. Hilton played well enough as a freshman to be selected by the Detroit Red Wings in the 3rd round of the 1993 NHL Draft. He provided depth scoring as an underclassmen but began to come into his own as a junior. Hilton more than doubled his point production in 1995 and played on his second US junior team.

As a senior, Hilton's goal production halved but his assist total swelled and he finished with the third highest total in the nation. The production earned him a spot on the All-American team and helped Michigan win their conference championship. The Wolverines made their 6th consecutive NCAA Tournament appearance and reached the championship game for the first time in 19 years. Hilton was held off the scoresheet in the final game but the Wolverines still managed to win the match in overtime, giving the program its 8th national championship overall and the first since 1964.

After graduating, Hilton began his professional career. He bounced around a bit in his first few seasons and ended up playing for the Mississippi Sea Wolves in 1999. He was one of the top scorers for the team during the Kelly Cup playoffs, helping the team win the championship. The next season he found himself playing for the Charlotte Checkers and remained with the club for most of the next three seasons. After two highly productive years and just a 1-game appearance at the AHL level, Hilton ended his playing career in 2002.

With his playing days over, Hilton began his second career in sales working for several company of the next two decades. He progressed up the ranks, eventually becoming a national sales and marketing manager with KHPP Windows and Doors in 2021.

== Statistics ==
=== Regular season and playoffs ===
			Regular Season					Playoffs
Season	Team	League	GP	G	A	Pts	PIM	GP	G	A	Pts	PIM
1992–93	Michigan	CCHA	23	16	15	31	8	—	—	—	—	—
1993–94	Michigan	CCHA	39	11	12	23	16	—	—	—	—	—
1994–95	Michigan	CCHA	37	20	31	51	14	—	—	—	—	—
1995–96	Michigan	CCHA	43	10	51	61	8	—	—	—	—	—
1996–97	Mississippi Sea Wolves	ECHL	28	8	13	21	9	—	—	—	—	—
1996–97	Quebec Rafales	IHL	11	1	0	1	2	—	—	—	—	—
1996–97	Worcester IceCats	AHL	27	3	7	10	23	4	0	2	2	0
1997–98	Mobile Mysticks	ECHL	69	29	53	82	50	3	0	2	2	2
1997–98	Orlando Solar Bears	IHL	1	0	0	0	0	—	—	—	—	—
1998–99	Alexandria Warthogs	WPHL	16	6	17	23	17	—	—	—	—	—
1998–99	Springfield Falcons	AHL	2	1	1	2	0	—	—	—	—	—
1998–99	Mississippi Sea Wolves	ECHL	48	16	29	45	22	18	7	8	15	14
1999–00	Charlotte Checkers	ECHL	67	17	31	48	54	—	—	—	—	—
2000–01	Charlotte Checkers	ECHL	71	19	61	80	38	4	0	4	4	4
2001–02	Hartford Wolf Pack	AHL	1	1	0	1	0	—	—	—	—	—
2001–02	Charlotte Checkers	ECHL	64	26	48	74	34	5	1	6	7	4
NCAA totals			157	57	109	166	46	—	—	—	—	—
ECHL totals			347	115	235	350	207	30	8	20	28	24
IHL totals			12	1	0	1	2	—	—	—	—	—
AHL totals			30	5	8	13	23	4	0	2	2	0

== Awards and honors ==
Award	Year
All-CCHA First Team	1995–96
AHCA West Second-Team All-American	1995–96
