= Warren Peters =

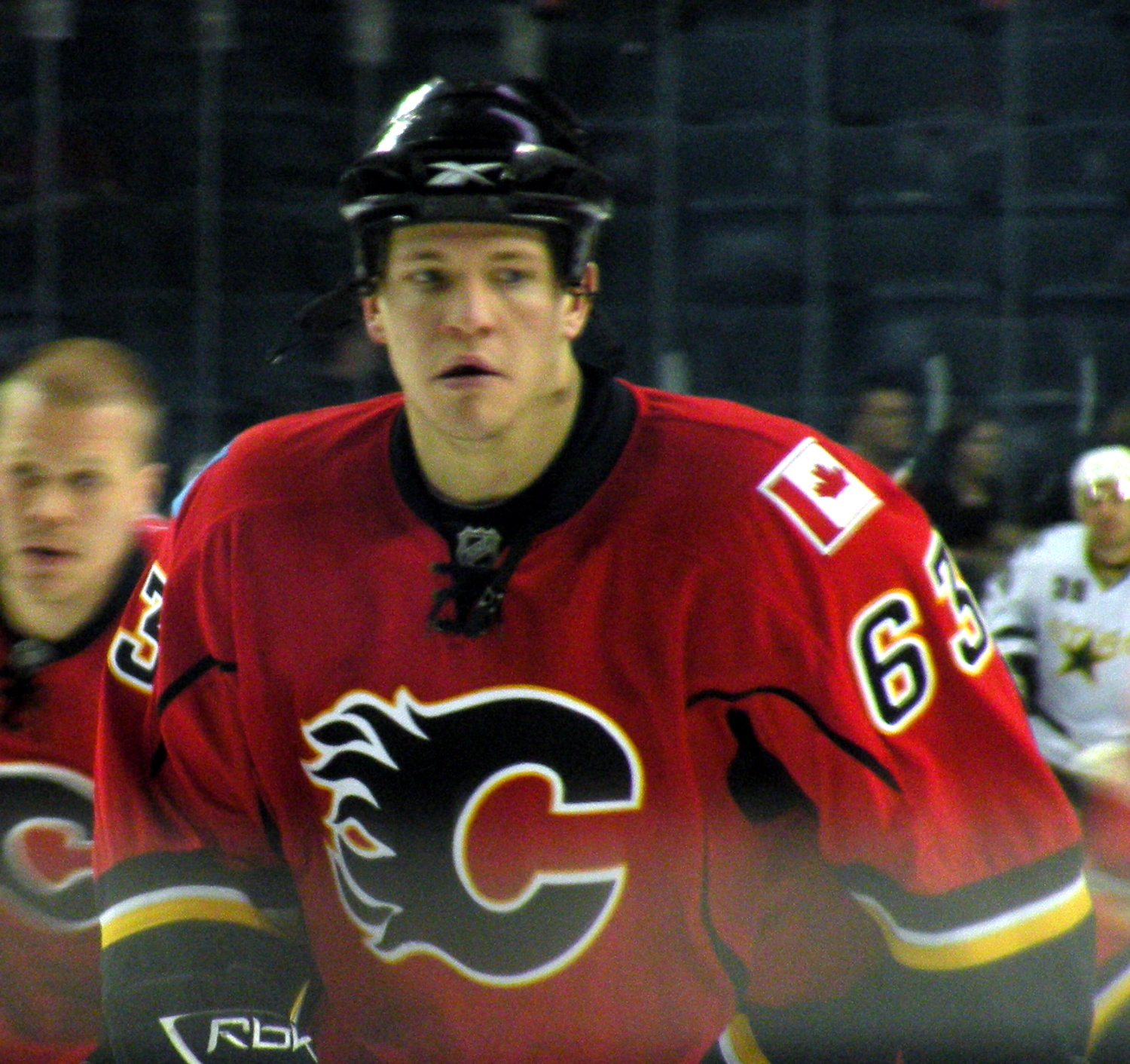
- Born: July 10, 1982 (age 44) Saskatoon, Saskatchewan, Canada
- Height: 6 ft 0 in (183 cm)
- Weight: 201 lb (91 kg; 14 st 5 lb)
- Position: Centre
- Shot: Left
- Played for: Calgary Flames; Dallas Stars; Minnesota Wild; SønderjyskE
- NHL draft: Undrafted
- Playing career: 2005–2015

Warren Peters (born July 10, 1982) is a Canadian former professional ice hockey player. An undrafted player, he played for the Calgary Flames, Dallas Stars and the Minnesota Wild.

== Playing career ==
A native of Saskatoon, Peters played five years of junior hockey with his hometown Saskatoon Blades before turning professional in 2003, playing one year in the American Hockey League (AHL) before spending two with the Idaho Steelheads of the ECHL. He signed with the Calgary Flames in 2005 and spent four years with their minor league organization, first for the Omaha Ak-Sar-Ben Knights, then with the Quad City Flames. He made his National Hockey League (NHL) debut with the Flames in December 7, 2008, against the New York Rangers, and scored his first goal on March 3, 2009, against the Ottawa Senators. Peters appeared in 16 games with the Flames.

On July 6, 2009, Peters signed a-one year, two-way contract with the Dallas Stars.

Following the 2009-10 season, Peters again moved on, signing a two-year deal with the Minnesota Wild on July 3, 2010. On July 1, 2012, Peters signed a one-year, two way contract with the Pittsburgh Penguins worth $600,000 at the NHL level. In the 2013–14 season, Peters returned to the Minnesota Wild organization by signing with AHL affiliate, the Iowa Wild, for their inaugural season.

Peters finished his career in Denmark's Metal Ligaen. According to TSN, Peters was criticized for placing a dangerous hit on Lasse Bang, who suffered a concussion as a result of the hit. Peters was given a six-game suspension as a result of the hit.

== Personal life ==
Since retirement, Peters is a realtor and resides in Omaha, Nebraska, with his wife Amber and their two sons, Connor and Corbin. He is now also a coach for Fremont flyers located in Fremont, Nebraska.

== Career statistics ==
			Regular Season					Playoffs
Season	Team	League	GP	G	A	Pts	PIM	GP	G	A	Pts	PIM
1997–98	Saskatoon Blades	WHL	1	0	0	0	0	—	—	—	—	—
1998–99	Saskatoon Blades	WHL	53	8	6	14	111	—	—	—	—	—
1999–00	Saskatoon Blades	WHL	70	11	17	28	97	10	1	2	3	13
2000–01	Saskatoon Blades	WHL	63	27	14	41	111	—	—	—	—	—
2001–02	Saskatoon Blades	WHL	72	34	26	60	115	7	1	4	5	13
2002–03	Saskatoon Blades	WHL	71	31	44	75	108	6	1	6	7	6
2003–04	Idaho Steelheads	ECHL	21	6	7	13	33	—	—	—	—	—
2003–04	Utah Grizzlies	AHL	55	4	4	8	63	—	—	—	—	—
2004–05	Idaho Steelheads	ECHL	69	23	23	46	131	4	0	1	1	12
2005–06	Omaha Ak-Sar-Ben Knights	AHL	77	15	10	25	133	—	—	—	—	—
2006–07	Omaha Ak-Sar-Ben Knights	AHL	79	17	16	33	95	6	2	1	3	4
2007–08	Quad City Flames	AHL	75	11	13	24	74	—	—	—	—	—
2008–09	Quad City Flames	AHL	62	11	6	17	51	—	—	—	—	—
2008–09	Calgary Flames	NHL	16	1	0	1	12	4	0	0	0	0
2009–10	Dallas Stars	NHL	11	1	0	1	2	—	—	—	—	—
2009–10	Texas Stars	AHL	61	20	14	34	52	23	4	4	8	56
2010–11	Houston Aeros	AHL	62	15	17	32	47	24	4	8	12	16
2010–11	Minnesota Wild	NHL	11	1	0	1	4	—	—	—	—	—
2011–12	Houston Aeros	AHL	20	7	4	11	46	—	—	—	—	—
2011–12	Minnesota Wild	NHL	58	1	4	5	54	—	—	—	—	—
2012–13	Wilkes-Barre/Scranton Penguins	AHL	73	11	8	19	76	15	4	1	5	16
2013–14	Iowa Wild	AHL	69	8	12	20	86	—	—	—	—	—
2014–15	SønderjyskE	DNK	11	7	6	13	6	11	7	3	10	37
NHL totals			96	4	4	8	72	4	0	0	0	0
