= Andrei Taratukhin =

Russian professional ice hockey centre (born 1983)

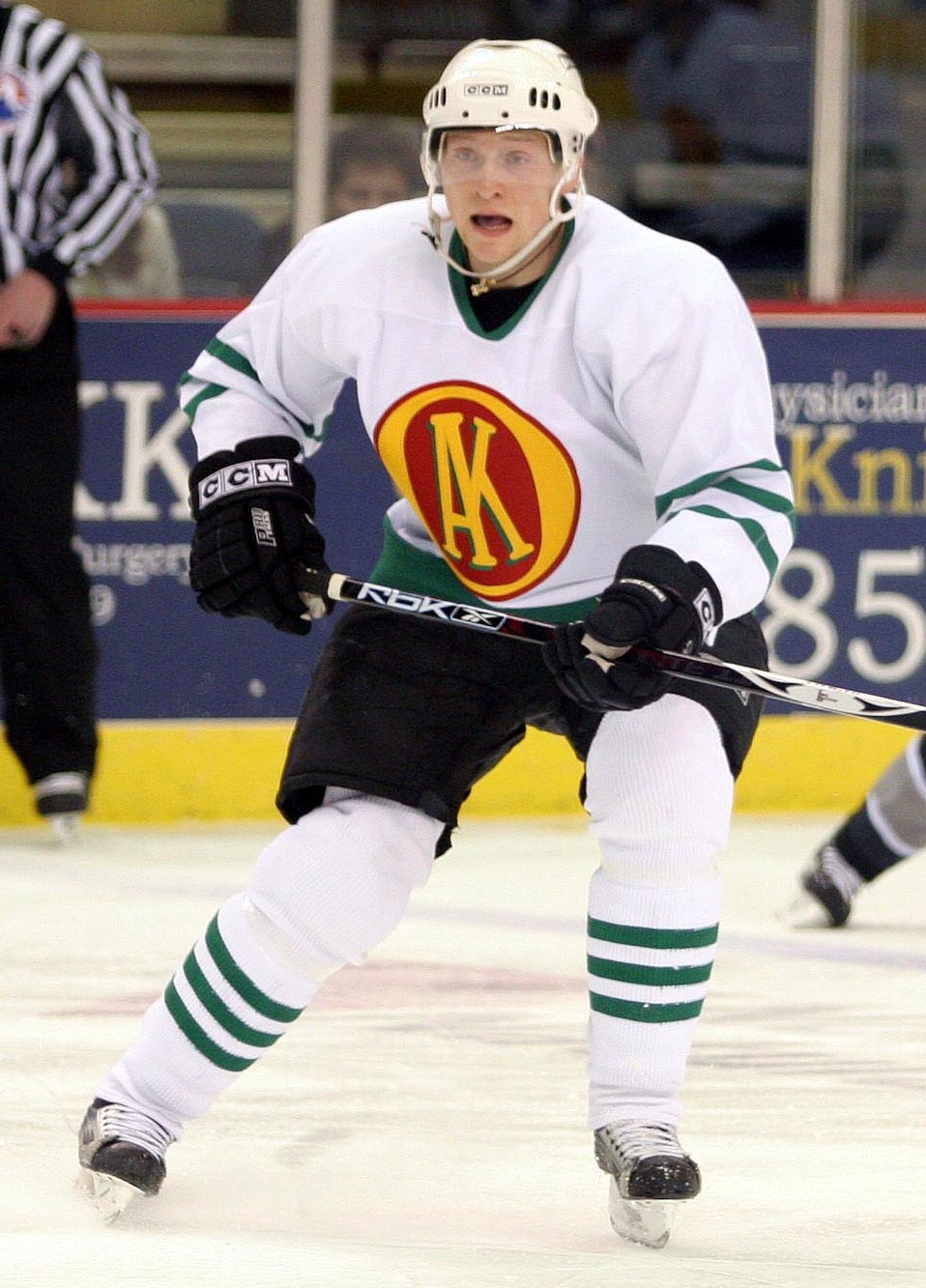
- Taratukhin with the Omaha Ak-Sar-Ben Knights in 2007
- Born: 22 February 1983 (age 43) Omsk, Russian SFSR, Soviet Union
- Height: 6 ft 0 in (183 cm)
- Weight: 211 lb (96 kg; 15 st 1 lb)
- Position: Centre
- Shot: Left
- Played for: Avangard Omsk; Salavat Yulaev Ufa; Lokomotiv Yaroslavl; HC Neftekhimik Nizhnekamsk; Atlant Moscow Oblast; HC Ugra; Amur Khabarovsk
- National team: Russia
- NHL draft: 41st overall, 2001; Calgary Flames
- Playing career: 2002–2022

Andrei Sergeevich Taratukhin (Russian: Андрей Сергеевич Таратухин; born 22 February 1983) is a Russian professional ice hockey centre.

Taratukhin was drafted 41st overall by the Calgary Flames in the 2001 NHL entry draft. He had spells with his hometown Avangard Omsk, Salavat Yulaev Ufa and Lokomotiv Yaroslavl before signing for the Flames in 2006. Taratukhin was assigned to the American Hockey League with the Omaha Ak-Sar-Ben Knights and in 80 regular games, he scored 17 goals and 43 assists for 60 points. It would be his only season in North America as he returned to Russia the next season, re-joining Salavat Yulaev Ufa.

== Career statistics ==
=== Regular season and playoffs ===
			Regular season					Playoffs
Season	Team	League	GP	G	A	Pts	PIM	GP	G	A	Pts	PIM
1998–99	Avangard–VDV Omsk	RUS.3	1	0	0	0	0	—	—	—	—	—
1999–2000	Avangard–VDV Omsk	RUS.3	27	10	6	16	16	—	—	—	—	—
1999–2000	Avangard Omsk	RSL	—	—	—	—	—	1	0	1	1	0
2000–01	Avangard–VDV Omsk	RUS.3	42	19	28	47	69	—	—	—	—	—
2001–02	Mostovik Kurgan	RUS.2	42	13	22	35	28	—	—	—	—	—
2002–03	Avangard Omsk	RSL	21	0	1	1	4	7	1	0	1	18
2002–03	Avangard–VDV Omsk	RUS.3	15	4	13	17	20	—	—	—	—	—
2003–04	Avangard Omsk	RSL	8	0	0	0	4	—	—	—	—	—
2003–04	Omskie Yastreby	RUS.3	9	4	7	11	6	—	—	—	—	—
2003–04	Mechel Chelyabinsk	RUS.2	15	3	12	15	12	12	1	4	5	6
2003–04	Mechel–2 Chelyabinsk	RUS.3	3	2	2	4	2	—	—	—	—	—
2004–05	Salavat Yulaev Ufa	RSL	54	7	5	12	73	—	—	—	—	—
2004–05	Salavat Yulaev–2 Ufa	RUS.3	2	0	1	1	0	—	—	—	—	—
2005–06	Lokomotiv Yaroslavl	RSL	40	9	15	24	85	11	2	2	4	24
2006–07	Omaha Ak–Sar–Ben Knights	AHL	80	17	43	60	80	—	—	—	—	—
2007–08	Salavat Yulaev Ufa	RSL	51	10	16	26	46	16	1	4	5	20
2008–09	Salavat Yulaev Ufa	KHL	56	10	21	31	58	4	1	0	1	2
2009–10	Salavat Yulaev Ufa	KHL	56	12	15	27	24	16	0	1	1	12
2010–11	Salavat Yulaev Ufa	KHL	40	1	7	8	24	9	1	2	3	6
2011–12	Salavat Yulaev Ufa	KHL	10	0	2	2	10	5	1	0	1	4
2012–13	Avangard Omsk	KHL	45	2	4	6	22	11	0	1	1	4
2013–14	Neftekhimik Nizhnekamsk	KHL	50	7	7	14	33	—	—	—	—	—
2014–15	Atlant Mytishchi	KHL	56	12	5	17	36	—	—	—	—	—
2015–16	Yugra Khanty-Mansiysk	KHL	39	1	8	9	30	—	—	—	—	—
2015–16	Rubin Tyumen	VHL	3	1	1	2	0	—	—	—	—	—
2016–17	Amur Khabarovsk	KHL	5	0	0	0	0	—	—	—	—	—
2016–17	Metallurg Novokuznetsk	KHL	30	2	1	3	22	—	—	—	—	—
2017–18	SC Csíkszereda	EL	37	8	34	42	26	9	4	7	11	16
2017–18	SC Csíkszereda	ROU	25	10	19	29	22	8	2	10	12	2
2018–19	SC Csíkszereda	EL	43	18	25	43	54	13	4	10	14	6
2018–19	SC Csíkszereda	ROU	25	25	28	53	22	7	2	1	3	2
2019–20	SC Csíkszereda	EL	44	17	25	42	28	5	2	3	5	0
2019–20	SC Csíkszereda	ROU	27	17	31	48	10	—	—	—	—	—
2020–21	SC Csíkszereda	EL	23	13	14	27		17	4	11	15
2020–21	SC Csíkszereda	ROU	12	8	12	20	4	9	7	7	14	12
2021–22	EV Füssen	GER.3	11	4	7	11	8	—	—	—	—	—
2021–22	SC Csíkszereda	EL	7	3	4	7	0	14	5	3	8	0
2021–22	SC Csíkszereda	ROU	9	9	6	15	0	—	—	—	—	—
RSL totals			174	26	37	63	212	35	4	7	11	62
KHL totals			387	47	70	117	259	45	3	4	7	28
EL totals			154	59	102	161	108	58	19	34	53	22

=== International ===
Year	Team	Event	Result	GP	G	A	Pts	PIM
2001	Russia	WJC18	1st place, gold medalist(s)	6	2	3	5	10
2002	Russia	WJC	1st place, gold medalist(s)	7	0	2	2	37
2003	Russia	WJC	1st place, gold medalist(s)	6	2	6	8	8
2006	Russia	OG	4th	5	0	0	0	2
Junior totals				19	4	11	15	55
Senior totals				5	0	0	0	2
