= Akina Shirt =

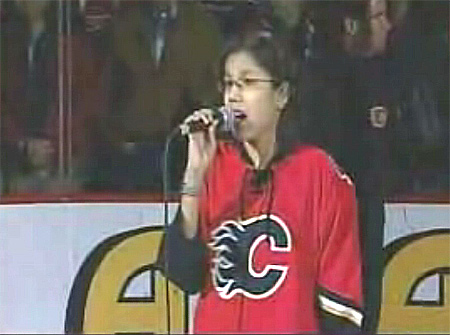
- Performing at a Calgary Flames game
- Born: January 18, 1994 (age 31); Edmonton, Alberta, Canada
- Known for: Vocals

Akina Shirt (born January 18, 1994) is a First Nations singer known for her performances in the Cree language. She has sung in Victoria School's Mixed Jazz Choir, the prestigious Kokopelli Choir, Shaftesbury High School choir and the Sacred Heart Church of First People's Choir.

== Performances ==
Shirt gained fame by singing "O Canada" in Cree at a National Hockey League game between the Calgary Flames and the Vancouver Canucks on February 3, 2007. This was the first time in Canadian history that the national anthem had been performed in an aboriginal language at a major league sporting event. She was also interviewed on CBC Radio One's As it Happens the night before the game, and sang the anthem on the show as well.

Shirt also recorded a five-song CD for Alberta Education in 2006 as part of their new social studies curriculum, launched in June 2007. She has performed at the Francis Winspear Centre for Music, Northern Alberta Jubilee Auditorium, the Jack Singer Concert Hall in Calgary as well as other venues.
