= Craig MacDonald (ice hockey, born 1977) =

Canadian ice hockey player

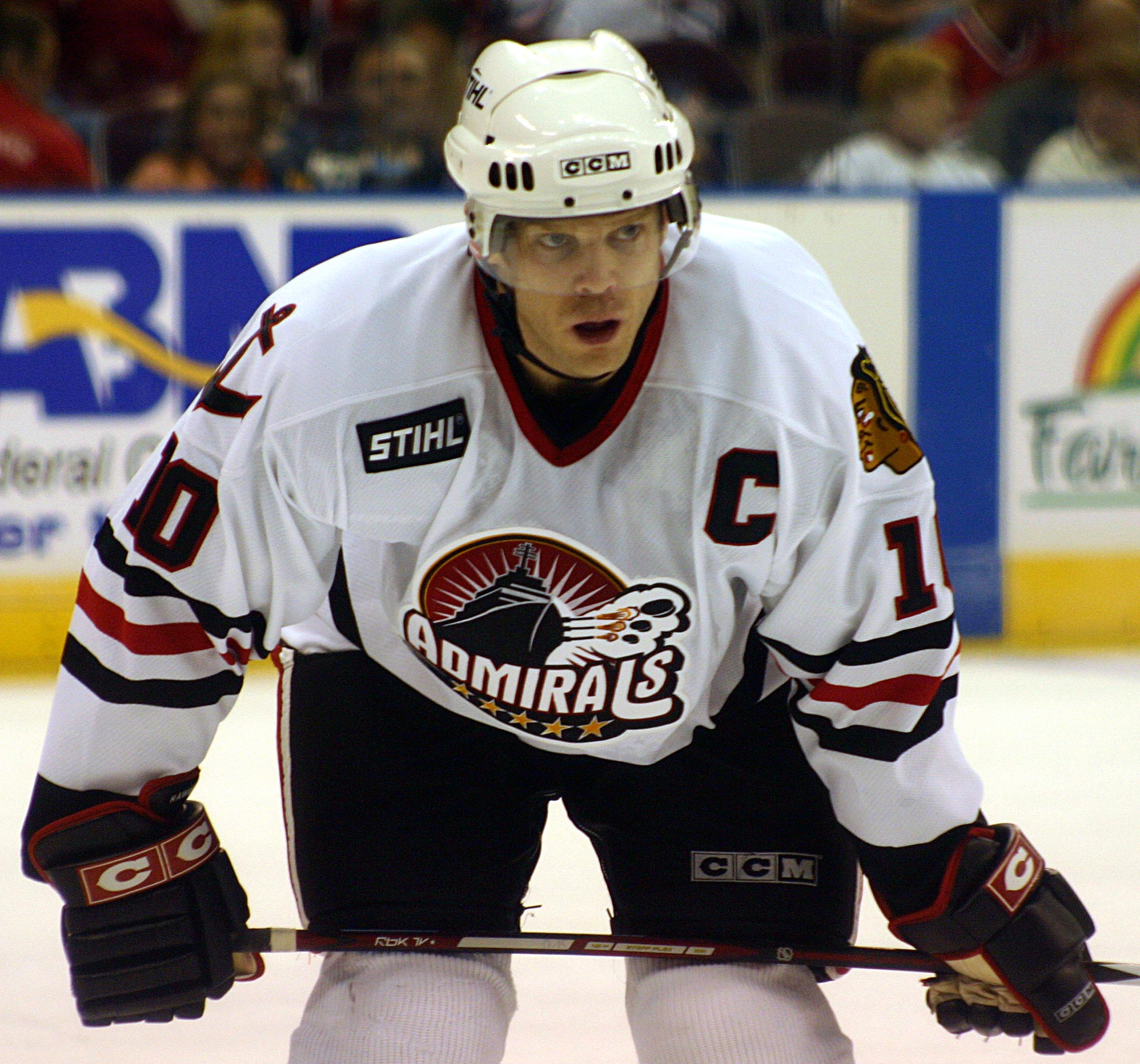
- MacDonald with the Norfolk Admirals in 2006
- Born: April 7, 1977 (age 49) Antigonish, Nova Scotia, Canada
- Height: 5 ft 11 in (180 cm)
- Weight: 201 lb (91 kg; 14 st 5 lb)
- Position: Left wing
- Shot: Left
- Played for: Carolina Hurricanes; Florida Panthers; Boston Bruins; Calgary Flames; Chicago Blackhawks; Tampa Bay Lightning; Columbus Blue Jackets; DEG Metro Stars; Adler Mannheim
- NHL draft: 88th overall, 1996; Hartford Whalers
- Playing career: 1998–2013

James Craig MacDonald (born April 7, 1977) is a Canadian former professional ice hockey player who played parts of eight seasons in the National Hockey League (NHL). He is from the town of Antigonish in Nova Scotia, Canada.

== Playing career ==
After gaining admission to Harvard University (where he majored in economics) MacDonald played for the Harvard varsity team before being drafted in the 4th round (88th overall) in the 1996 NHL entry draft by the Hartford Whalers. His rights were transferred to Carolina when the franchise moved there in 1997. After two years he joined the Canadian Olympic team in 1998, he signed with Carolina the following year, and played his first NHL game on January 7, 1999, against the Pittsburgh Penguins in the 1998–99 NHL season. On January 20, 2004, MacDonald was claimed off waivers by the Boston Bruins. On August 11, 2005, he signed as a free agent for the Calgary Flames.

While playing for the Florida Panthers, MacDonald was on a line with Marcus Nilson and Byron Ritchie that was named the John Deere line. They got this name due to them working hard every shift. The John Deere line was reunited in Calgary in the 2005–06 NHL season. On July 2, 2007, MacDonald signed with the Tampa Bay Lightning.

On December 20, 2007, during a game versus the Toronto Maple Leafs, MacDonald was hit by a wrist shot from Toronto defenceman Hal Gill that fractured nine of MacDonald's teeth, only three of which were able to be salvaged. He also required 25–30 stitches to close a cut in his tongue and an additional 50 or so to sew together wounds to the inside of his lip and gums, according to team trainer Tom Mulligan. MacDonald also underwent three root canal surgeries the following morning. He wore a full cage on his helmet to protect him from any further injury.

On July 14, 2008, MacDonald signed a one-year, two-way contract with the Columbus Blue Jackets. Craig is also one of the few NHL players who have attended Harvard. He left North America on June 30, 2009, and signed for German Deutsche Eishockey Liga team DEG Metro Stars. After one year with DEG Metro Stars signed on April 6, 2010, with fellow DEL team, Adler Mannheim.

In addition to having been a professional hockey player, MacDonald is also an accomplished golfer, having won two consecutive Nova Scotia Junior Golf Championship titles- and considered professional golf as a career before being signed by the Carolina Hurricanes of the NHL.

== Career statistics ==
=== Regular season and playoffs ===
			Regular season					Playoffs
Season	Team	League	GP	G	A	Pts	PIM	GP	G	A	Pts	PIM
1995–96	Harvard University	ECAC	34	7	10	17	8	—	—	—	—	—
1996–97	Harvard University	ECAC	32	6	10	16	20	—	—	—	—	—
1997–98	Canadian National Team	Intl	62	18	29	47	38	—	—	—	—	—
1998–99	Beast of New Haven	AHL	62	17	31	48	77	—	—	—	—	—
1998–99	Carolina Hurricanes	NHL	11	0	0	0	0	1	0	0	0	0
1999–00	Cincinnati Cyclones	IHL	78	12	24	36	76	11	4	1	5	8
2000–01	Cincinnati Cyclones	IHL	82	20	28	48	104	5	0	1	1	6
2001–02	Lowell Lock Monsters	AHL	64	19	22	41	61	—	—	—	—	—
2001–02	Carolina Hurricanes	NHL	12	1	1	2	0	4	0	0	0	2
2002–03	Lowell Lock Monsters	AHL	27	7	20	27	38	—	—	—	—	—
2002–03	Carolina Hurricanes	NHL	35	1	3	4	20	—	—	—	—	—
2003–04	Florida Panthers	NHL	34	0	3	3	25	—	—	—	—	—
2003–04	San Antonio Rampage	AHL	2	0	0	0	4	—	—	—	—	—
2003–04	Boston Bruins	NHL	18	0	3	3	8	1	0	0	0	0
2004–05	Lowell Lock Monsters	AHL	71	10	18	28	104	2	0	0	0	0
2005–06	Omaha Ak-Sar-Ben Knights	AHL	13	1	3	4	29	—	—	—	—	—
2005–06	Calgary Flames	NHL	25	3	2	5	8	1	0	0	0	0
2006–07	Norfolk Admirals	AHL	7	3	6	9	12	—	—	—	—	—
2006–07	Chicago Blackhawks	NHL	25	3	2	5	14	—	—	—	—	—
2007–08	Tampa Bay Lightning	NHL	65	2	9	11	16	—	—	—	—	—
2007–08	Norfolk Admirals	AHL	7	3	8	11	8	—	—	—	—	—
2008–09	Syracuse Crunch	AHL	70	15	25	40	71	—	—	—	—	—
2008–09	Columbus Blue Jackets	NHL	8	1	1	2	0	—	—	—	—	—
2009–10	DEG Metro Stars	DEL	56	19	23	42	76	3	2	0	2	0
2010–11	Adler Mannheim	DEL	51	6	22	28	123	5	0	2	2	4
2011–12	Adler Mannheim	DEL	28	6	14	20	12	14	3	5	8	6
2012–13	Adler Mannheim	DEL	51	7	22	29	68	6	0	1	1	4
NHL totals			233	11	24	35	91	7	0	0	0	2

== Awards and honors ==
Award	Year
All-ECAC Hockey Rookie Team	1995–96
