= Carsen Germyn =

Canadian ice hockey player (born 1982)

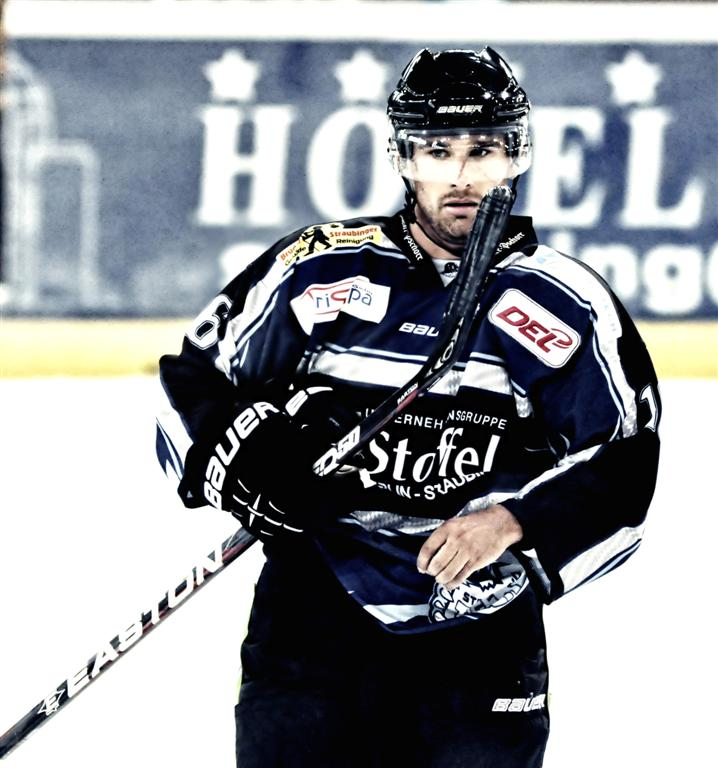
- Born: February 22, 1982 (age 43) Campbell River, British Columbia, Canada
- Height: 5 ft 10 in (178 cm)
- Weight: 185 lb (84 kg; 13 st 3 lb)
- Position: Right wing
- Shot: Right
- Played for: Calgary Flames; EHC Olten; Straubing Tigers; AIK IF
- NHL draft: Undrafted
- Playing career: 2003–2015

Carsen Germyn (born February 22, 1982) is a Canadian former professional ice hockey right wing who played 4 games in the National Hockey League (NHL) with the Calgary Flames.

== Playing career ==
Germyn played five seasons in the Western Hockey League. He played for the Kelowna Rockets and then for the Red Deer Rebels. He started his professional career with the Norfolk Admirals of the American Hockey League. On July 6, 2004, he was signed as a free agent by the Calgary Flames. They assigned him to the Lowell Lock Monsters in 2004–05 then to the Omaha Ak-Sar-Ben Knights for the 2005–06 season. He played his first National Hockey League game on April 1, 2006, with the Flames against the Edmonton Oilers.

In the late summer of 2010, Germyn signed a two-year contract with EHC Olten, a Swiss National League B team, where he played alongside American-born Marty Sertich scoring 45 points in 36 games. On June 18, 2011, Germyn was released from the final year of his contract to join the Straubing Tigers of the German DEL.

Towards the end of his third season with the Straubing Tigers in 2013–14, with the club out of contention for the playoffs, he was loaned for the remainder of the season to AIK IF of the Swedish Hockey League, on February 26, 2014.

== Career statistics ==
			Regular season					Playoffs
Season	Team	League	GP	G	A	Pts	PIM	GP	G	A	Pts	PIM
1998–99	Kelowna Rockets	WHL	59	6	10	16	61	5	0	0	0	2
1999–2000	Kelowna Rockets	WHL	71	16	29	45	111	5	3	3	6	4
2000–01	Kelowna Rockets	WHL	71	35	52	87	102	6	2	6	8	10
2001–02	Kelowna Rockets	WHL	23	10	18	28	43	—	—	—	—	—
2001–02	Red Deer Rebels	WHL	37	23	25	48	83	23	4	12	16	24
2002–03	Red Deer Rebels	WHL	63	26	33	59	108	23	4	9	13	25
2003–04	Norfolk Admirals	AHL	77	11	16	27	104	6	1	0	1	2
2004–05	Lowell Lock Monsters	AHL	60	9	11	20	115	10	0	0	0	25
2005–06	Omaha Ak-Sar-Ben Knights	AHL	77	24	31	55	127	—	—	—	—	—
2005–06	Calgary Flames	NHL	2	0	0	0	0	—	—	—	—	—
2006–07	Omaha Ak-Sar-Ben Knights	AHL	77	28	32	60	124	6	1	1	2	2
2006–07	Calgary Flames	NHL	2	0	0	0	0	—	—	—	—	—
2007–08	Quad City Flames	AHL	77	19	29	48	133	—	—	—	—	—
2008–09	Quad City Flames	AHL	75	13	47	60	57	—	—	—	—	—
2009–10	Abbotsford Heat	AHL	21	5	10	15	8	—	—	—	—	—
2010–11	EHC Olten	NLB	36	18	27	45	26	10	1	5	6	6
2011–12	Straubing Tigers	DEL	49	14	25	39	70	8	3	4	7	16
2012–13	Straubing Tigers	DEL	52	16	14	30	75	1	0	0	0	0
2013–14	Straubing Tigers	DEL	49	16	21	37	66	—	—	—	—	—
2013–14	AIK IF	SHL	2	0	1	1	2	—	—	—	—	—
2014–15	Straubing Tigers	DEL	9	1	3	4	33	—	—	—	—	—
NHL totals			4	0	0	0	0	—	—	—	—	—
