= Omaha Ak-Sar-Ben Knights =

- City: Omaha, Nebraska
- League: American Hockey League
- Founded: 1977
- Operated: 2005–2007
- Home arena: Omaha Civic Auditorium
- Colors: Red, black, gold, silver
- Affiliates: Calgary Flames

Franchise history
- 1977–1987: Maine Mariners
- 1987–1993: Utica Devils
- 1993–2003: Saint John Flames
- 2005–2007: Omaha Ak-Sar-Ben Knights
- 2007–2009: Quad City Flames
- 2009–2014: Abbotsford Heat
- 2014–2015: Adirondack Flames
- 2015–2022: Stockton Heat
- 2022–Present: Calgary Wranglers

Championships
- Division titles: 1: (2006–07)

The Omaha Ak-Sar-Ben Knights were a professional ice hockey team in the American Hockey League. They played in Omaha, Nebraska, United States at the Omaha Civic Auditorium from 2005–2007. Following the 2006–07 season, the team relocated to the Quad Cities for 2007–08.

== History ==
In 2005, the AHL franchise of the Calgary Flames (the Saint John Flames, which existed from 1993 to 2003) was reestablished in Omaha. The Ak-Sar-Ben part of the team's name comes from the Knights of Ak-Sar-Ben, an Omaha civic organization, whose logo was integrated into the insignia of the team and was a partner with the Omaha organization. Ak-Sar-Ben, which is "Nebraska" spelled backwards, was also the name of the arena of the original Omaha Knights. The team logo was shown with identical flame marks as the Calgary Flames' logo.

Following two difficult seasons at the gate, rumors swirled around both Omaha and the Quad Cities that the Flames would relocate their affiliate to the latter region, which was at the time served by the Quad City Mallards of the United Hockey League. The Calgary Flames and Quad City Mallards confirmed the move on May 24, 2007.

== Season-by-season record ==
Year	GP	W	L	OTL	SOL	GF	GA	PTS	Finish	Playoffs
2005–06	80	35	31	3	11	206	221	84	6th, West	Out of playoffs
2006–07	80	49	25	5	1	214	189	104	1st, West	Lost 1st round, 4–2, Iowa Stars

== Team records ==
=== Single season ===
Goals: 28, Carsen Germyn (2006–07)
Assists: 43, Andrei Taratukhin (2006–07)
Points: 60, Dustin Boyd, Carsen Germyn, and Andrei Taratukhin (2006–07)
Penalty minutes: 294, Brandon Prust (2005–06)
Plus/minus: +27, David Van Der Gulik (2006–07)
Wins: 35, Curtis McElhinney (2006–07)
Shutouts: 7, Curtis McElhinney (2006–07)
GAA: 2.13, Curtis McElhinney (2006–07)
SV%: .917, Curtis McElhinney (2006–07)

=== Career ===
Career goals: 52, Carsen Germyn
Career assists: 63, Carsen Germyn
Career points: 115, Carsen Germyn
Career penalty minutes: 505, Brandon Prust
Career goaltending wins: 44, Curtis McElhinney
Career shutouts: 10, Curtis McElhinney
Career games: 156, Warren Peters

=== Team captains ===
- Craig MacDonald 2005–06
- No captain; (Carsen Germyn, Warren Peters, and Brad Ference served as alternates) 2006–07

== See also ==
- Sports in Omaha, Nebraska
