= François Beauchemin =

Canadian ice hockey player (born 1980)

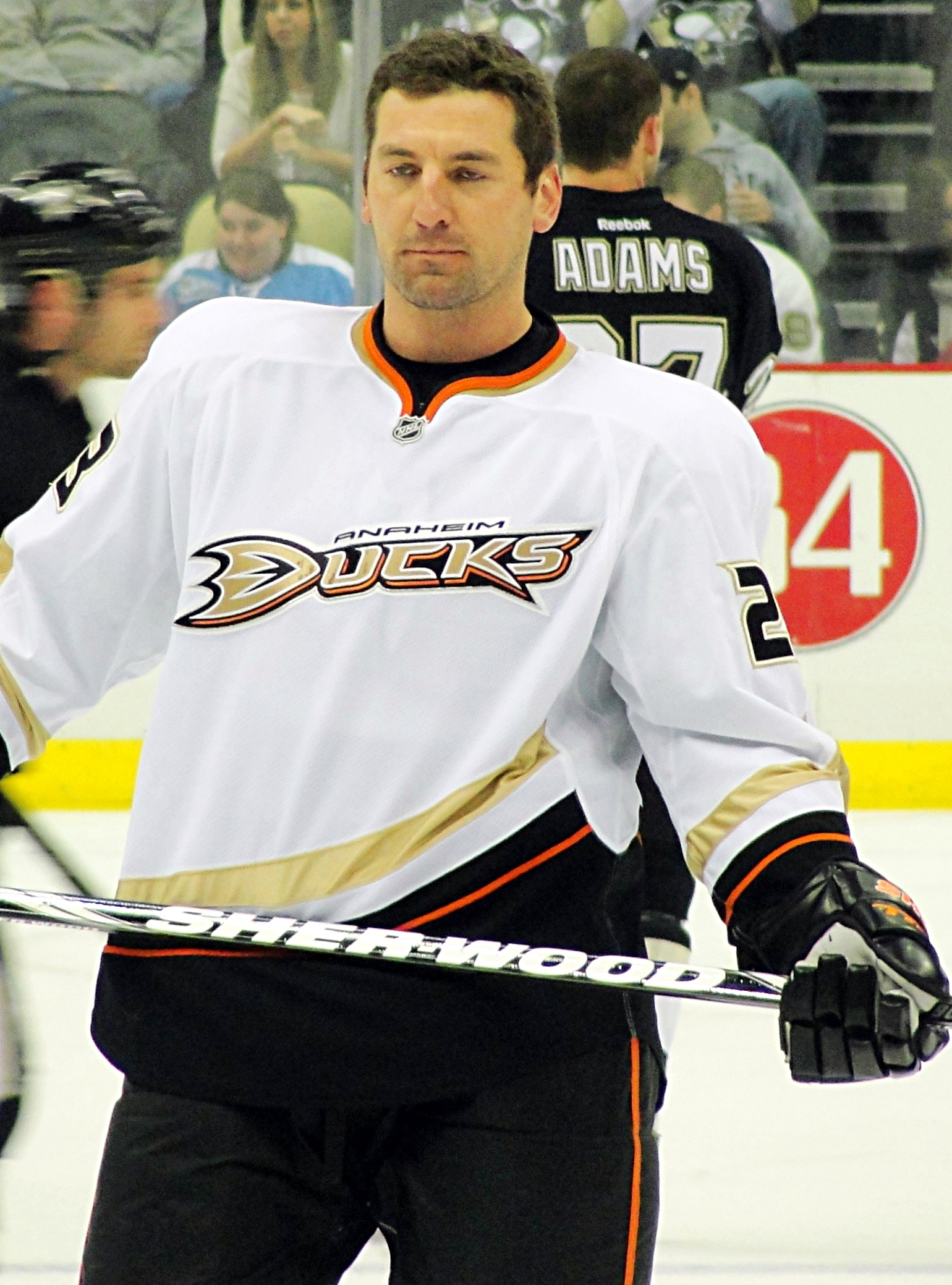
- Beauchemin with the Anaheim Ducks in 2012
- Born: June 4, 1980 (age 46) Sorel-Tracy, Quebec, Canada
- Height: 6 ft 1 in (185 cm)
- Weight: 208 lb (94 kg; 14 st 12 lb)
- Position: Defence
- Shot: Left
- Played for: Montreal Canadiens; Columbus Blue Jackets; Anaheim Ducks; Toronto Maple Leafs; Colorado Avalanche
- National team: Canada
- NHL draft: 75th overall, 1998; Montreal Canadiens
- Playing career: 2000–2018

Joseph Jean-François Vinet Beauchemin (born June 4, 1980) is a Canadian former professional ice hockey defenceman who played in the National Hockey League (NHL). Drafted in the third round, 75th overall, by the Montreal Canadiens in the 1998 NHL entry draft, he spent most of his career playing for the Anaheim Ducks, winning a Stanley Cup in 2007.

== Playing career ==
=== Junior ===
Beauchemin played major junior hockey in the Quebec Major Junior Hockey League (QMJHL) for four seasons with the Laval Titan Collège Français, Acadie-Bathurst Titan and Moncton Wildcats. In his NHL draft year, he recorded 47 points in 70 games with Laval. He was then drafted 76th overall by the Montreal Canadiens in the 1998 NHL entry draft. Upon being drafted, he returned to the QMJHL for two more seasons, helping Acadie-Bathurst to a President's Cup in 1999 as QMJHL champions.

=== Professional ===
==== Montreal Canadiens and Columbus Blue Jackets ====
After signing an entry-level contract with the Canadiens, Beauchemin turned professional in the 2000–01 season with their American Hockey League (AHL) affiliate at the time, the Quebec Citadelles. In 56 games, he was able to develop on the bottom pair with three goals and nine points. After a stagnant season in 2001–02, Beauchemin experienced a brief loan to the Mississippi Sea Wolves of the ECHL.

Beauchemin enjoyed a successful third season within the Canadiens organization in 2002–03, playing in 75 games with the Hamilton Bulldogs, the club's new AHL affiliate, increasing his offensive presence with a strong defensive game in totalling 28 points in 75 games as the club finished atop the standings before losing in the Calder Cup finals in a deciding Game 7 to the Houston Aeros. On February 27, 2003, Beauchemin made his NHL debut with the Canadiens, against the Minnesota Wild, his only NHL appearance of the season. On June 17, 2003, as a restricted free agent, Beauchemin signed a two-year contract extension with Montreal.

In the 2003–04 season, Beauchemin was unable to make the Canadiens' roster, remaining in the AHL as the Bulldogs top defenceman to improve his career best points totals with 36 in 77 games. On September 14, 2004, he was placed on waivers and claimed by the Columbus Blue Jackets. As NHL play was suspended due to the 2004–05 NHL lockout, he spent the 2004–05 season with the Blue Jackets' AHL affiliate, the Syracuse Crunch.

==== Anaheim Ducks ====
In the 2005–06 season, Beauchemin earned an NHL roster spot for opening night with the Blue Jackets and played 11 games with the club in before being traded (along with Tyler Wright) to the Mighty Ducks of Anaheim in exchange for Sergei Fedorov on November 15, 2005. He made his Ducks debut on November 18 in a game against the Colorado Avalanche and later scored his first NHL goal in game against the Carolina Hurricanes on December 6, 2005. He emerged as a top-four defenceman with the Ducks and immediately began producing, scoring 34 points in 61 games after the trade to finish fourth among rookie defenceman in scoring. In the 2006 Stanley Cup playoffs, Beauchemin contributed with 9 points in 16 games to lead all rookie defenceman.

After establishing himself with the Ducks, Beauchemin helped Anaheim to a Stanley Cup championship in just his second full season in 2006–07. He contributed four goals and four assists during the 2007 playoffs for the Ducks. In the following 2007–08 season, he continued his play among the top-four defenceman on the Ducks and appeared in his 200th NHL game on February 2, 2008, against the Philadelphia Flyers.

On November 14, 2008, Beauchemin suffered a torn ACL in his left knee in a game against the Nashville Predators. He was expected to be sidelined for the remainder of the 2008–09 season, but returned to the Ducks for their Western Conference Quarterfinal playoff series against the San Jose Sharks.

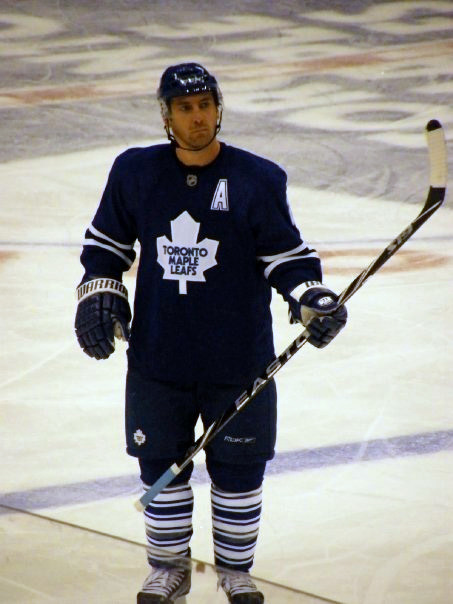
Beauchemin during his tenure with the Toronto Maple Leafs.

==== Toronto Maple Leafs ====
On July 6, 2009, as an unrestricted free agent and with the Ducks close to the salary cap ceiling, Beauchemin left the Ducks to sign a three-year, $11.4 million contract with the Toronto Maple Leafs. Looked upon to bring a veteran presence and leadership from the blueline, he appeared in all 82 of Toronto's games during the 2009–10 season. Beauchemin produced 5 goals and 26 points and led the club in time on ice in his first season as an alternate captain with the Maple Leafs. He appeared in his 300th career NHL game on January 26, 2010, against the Los Angeles Kings.

In the following 2010–11 season, Beauchemin began the season on the top defensive pairing, alongside Dion Phaneuf. With his production down and with the Maple Leafs heading towards again missing the playoffs, on February 9, 2011, Beauchemin was traded back to the Anaheim Ducks in exchange for left winger Joffrey Lupul, defenceman Jake Gardiner and a conditional fourth-round draft pick in 2013.

==== Return to Anaheim ====
Beauchemin was a welcomed return for the Anaheim Ducks, resuming a role as a top-four defenceman to help the club reach the playoffs. He appeared in his 400th career NHL game on March 23, 2011, against the Dallas Stars.

In his sixth season with the Ducks, in 2011–12, Beauchemin provided a defensive anchor and was looked upon to lead the Ducks in ice time. He led the NHL in short-handed ice time and on January 21 blocked nine shots against the Ottawa Senators to set a Ducks franchise record. On January 20, 2012, Beauchemin signed a three-year, US$10.5 million contract extension to remain in Anaheim. He finished the season scoring 8 goals and 22 points in 82 games.

In the shortened lockout 2012–13 season, Beauchemin appeared in all 48 regular season games for the Ducks, and again led the club in ice time. He led the blueline in scoring with 24 points and appeared in his 500th career NHL game on February 6, 2013, against the Avalanche. He recorded a career-high four points (all assists) in a victory over the Avalanche on February 24, 2013. In the 2013 playoffs, Beauchemin scored his tenth career playoff goal to surpass Scott Niedermayer as the franchise leader in playoff goals for a defenceman, doing so in Game 1 of the Conference Quarterfinals against the Detroit Red Wings. Beauchemin finished fourth in James Norris Memorial Trophy voting, the award given to the NHL's defenceman of the year. He lost-out to winner P. K. Subban and finalists Ryan Suter and Kris Letang, although Beauchemin won The Hockey News' Rod Langway Award as Best Defensive Defenceman in 2013. He was also named to the NHL's Second All-Star Team.

In the 2013–14 season, Beauchemin scored 17 points in 70 games, placing fifth in the NHL in plus-minus as the Ducks claimed the top seeding in the Western Conference from the regular season. Beauchemin played his 600th career NHL game on March 23, 2014, against the Florida Panthers, and was selected as the Ducks' nominee for the Bill Masterton Memorial Trophy.

Beauchemin scored a career-high 11 goals for 23 points in 63 games with the Ducks during the 2014–15 season. He recorded nine assists during the 2015 playoffs as the Ducks were eliminated in seven games in the Western Conference Finals by the Chicago Blackhawks. With the Ducks acquisition of Kevin Bieksa in the off-season, signalling the end of his Ducks tenure as an impending free agent, Beauchemin left the club second among all defenceman in franchise history in goals, assists and points. He also left tied with Ryan Getzlaf for most playoff games for the Ducks with 97.

==== Colorado Avalanche ====
On July 1, 2015, and in the opening hour of free agency, Beauchemin signed a three-year, $13.5 million contract with the Colorado Avalanche. Adding a veteran presence to a young blueline in Colorado, Beauchemin recorded three assists in his debut with the Avalanche on opening night in a 5–4 defeat to the Minnesota Wild on October 8, 2015. In playing in a top-pairing role alongside Erik Johnson in the 2015–16 season, Beauchemin matched his rookie season with the Mighty Ducks in 2005–06 in contributing 8 goals and 34 points while leading the Avalanche in ice-time through 82 games.

On October 13, 2016, two days before the Avalanche home opener, Beauchemin was named an alternate captain for the 2016–17 season. In his second season with the Avalanche, Beauchemin was unable to repeat his performance as a top pairing defenceman with the cellar-dwelling Avalanche. On January 25, 2017, Beauchemin appeared in his 800th career NHL game in a 3–2 defeat to the Vancouver Canucks. He completed the season with 5 goals and 18 points in 81 games. Because he had a no-movement clause in his contract, which limited the team's flexibility in the upcoming expansion draft; and because of the Avalanche's intentions to make the transition to become younger, Beauchemin was bought-out from the final year of his contract in Colorado on June 15, 2017, in order to protect a younger player from being claimed by the expansion Vegas Golden Knights.

==== Third return to Anaheim ====
On August 21, 2017, Beauchemin returned to the Ducks for a third stint after signing a one-year, $1 million contract. Beauchemin, who announced the 2017–18 season would be his last as a player, retired after the Ducks were eliminated in a first round playoff sweep by the San Jose Sharks.

== International play ==
Beauchemin was selected for the 2010 Winter Olympics summer preliminary roster for Team Canada in August 2009, but did not make the final roster cut. After failing to make the 2010 playoffs with Toronto, he made his senior debut at the 2010 IIHF World Championships. Serving as an alternate captain, Beauchemin recorded one assist in seven games as Canada finished in seventh place in the tournament.

== Personal life ==
Beauchemin and his wife Marie Claude have two children: a son and a daughter. Both were born in Anaheim, California. The family resides in their hometown Sorel, Quebec, during the off-season.

== Career statistics ==
=== Regular season and playoffs ===
			Regular season					Playoffs
Season	Team	League	GP	G	A	Pts	PIM	GP	G	A	Pts	PIM
1995–96	Collège Charles-Lemoyne	QMAAA	40	9	23	32	59	4	1	7	8
1996–97	Laval Titan Collège Français	QMJHL	66	7	20	27	112	3	0	0	0	2
1997–98	Laval Titan Collège Français	QMJHL	70	12	35	47	132	16	1	3	4	23
1998–99	Acadie-Bathurst Titan	QMJHL	31	4	17	21	53	23	2	16	18	55
1999–2000	Acadie-Bathurst Titan	QMJHL	38	11	36	47	64	—	—	—	—	—
1999–2000	Moncton Wildcats	QMJHL	33	8	31	39	35	16	2	11	13	14
2000–01	Quebec Citadelles	AHL	56	3	6	9	44	—	—	—	—	—
2001–02	Mississippi Sea Wolves	ECHL	7	1	3	4	2	—	—	—	—	—
2001–02	Quebec Citadelles	AHL	56	8	11	19	88	3	0	1	1	0
2002–03	Hamilton Bulldogs	AHL	75	7	21	28	92	23	1	9	10	16
2002–03	Montreal Canadiens	NHL	1	0	0	0	0	—	—	—	—	—
2003–04	Hamilton Bulldogs	AHL	77	9	27	36	57	10	2	4	6	18
2004–05	Syracuse Crunch	AHL	72	3	27	30	55	—	—	—	—	—
2005–06	Columbus Blue Jackets	NHL	11	0	2	2	11	—	—	—	—	—
2005–06	Mighty Ducks of Anaheim	NHL	61	8	26	34	41	16	3	6	9	11
2006–07	Anaheim Ducks	NHL	71	7	21	28	49	20	4	4	8	16
2007–08	Anaheim Ducks	NHL	82	2	19	21	59	6	0	0	0	26
2008–09	Anaheim Ducks	NHL	20	4	1	5	12	13	1	0	1	15
2009–10	Toronto Maple Leafs	NHL	82	5	21	26	33	—	—	—	—	—
2010–11	Toronto Maple Leafs	NHL	54	2	10	12	16	—	—	—	—	—
2010–11	Anaheim Ducks	NHL	27	3	2	5	16	6	0	2	2	2
2011–12	Anaheim Ducks	NHL	82	8	14	22	48	—	—	—	—	—
2012–13	Anaheim Ducks	NHL	48	6	18	24	22	7	2	4	6	4
2013–14	Anaheim Ducks	NHL	70	4	13	17	39	13	0	4	4	2
2014–15	Anaheim Ducks	NHL	64	11	12	23	48	16	0	9	9	2
2015–16	Colorado Avalanche	NHL	82	8	26	34	38	—	—	—	—	—
2016–17	Colorado Avalanche	NHL	81	5	13	18	32	—	—	—	—	—
2017–18	Anaheim Ducks	NHL	67	3	14	17	26	4	0	0	0	2
NHL totals			903	76	212	288	490	101	10	29	39	80

=== International ===
Year	Team	Event	Result	GP	G	A	Pts	PIM
2010	Canada	WC	7th	7	0	1	1	0
Senior totals				7	0	1	1	0

== Awards and honours ==
Award	Year
QMJHL
All-Rookie Team	1997
CHL Top Prospects Game	1998
President's Cup	1999
Second All-Star Team	2000
CHL Third All-Star Team	2000
NHL
Stanley Cup	2007
Second All-Star Team	2013
