= 2007 Stanley Cup playoffs =

American and Canadian hockey competition

Tournament details
- Dates: April 11–June 6, 2007
- Teams: 16
- Defending champions: Carolina Hurricanes (did not qualify)

Final positions
- Champions: Anaheim Ducks
- Runners-up: Ottawa Senators

Tournament statistics
- Scoring leader(s): Daniel Alfredsson (Senators); Jason Spezza (Senators); Dany Heatley (Senators) (22 points)

Awards
- MVP: Scott Niedermayer (Ducks)

The 2007 Stanley Cup playoffs of the National Hockey League began on April 11, 2007. The sixteen teams that qualified, eight from each conference, played best-of-seven series for conference quarterfinals, semifinals and championships, and then the conference champions played a best-of-seven series for the Stanley Cup. The series ended on June 6 with the Anaheim Ducks defeating the Ottawa Senators in five games to win their first ever championship.

For the first time in NHL history, neither of the two teams that played in the previous year's Stanley Cup Final (the Carolina Hurricanes and the Edmonton Oilers) qualified for the playoffs. This was the Colorado Avalanche's first season missing the playoffs since 1994, when they were still in Quebec, and thus was their first missed postseason since relocating to Denver. Also for the first time since 1994, the Philadelphia Flyers missed the playoffs. This was the only time that the Atlanta Thrashers qualified for the playoffs in their twelve years in Georgia (they became the new Winnipeg Jets in 2011). This was also the last time all three New York metropolitan area teams (the Devils, Islanders and Rangers) made the playoffs in the same year until 2023.

== Playoff seeds ==
The top eight teams in each conference qualified for the playoffs. The top three seeds in each conference were awarded to the division winners; while the five remaining spots were awarded to the highest finishers in their respective conferences.

The following teams qualified for the playoffs:

=== Eastern Conference ===
1. Buffalo Sabres, Northeast Division champions, Eastern Conference regular season champions, Presidents' Trophy winners – 113 points (53 wins)
2. New Jersey Devils, Atlantic Division champions – 107 points
3. Atlanta Thrashers, Southeast Division champions – 97 points
4. Ottawa Senators – 105 points (48 wins)
5. Pittsburgh Penguins – 105 points (47 wins)
6. New York Rangers – 94 points
7. Tampa Bay Lightning – 93 points
8. New York Islanders – 92 points

=== Western Conference ===
1. Detroit Red Wings, Central Division champions, Western Conference regular season champions – 113 points (50 wins)
2. Anaheim Ducks, Pacific Division champions – 110 points
3. Vancouver Canucks, Northwest Division champions – 105 points
4. Nashville Predators – 110 points
5. San Jose Sharks – 107 points (51 wins)
6. Dallas Stars – 107 points (50 wins)
7. Minnesota Wild – 104 points
8. Calgary Flames – 96 points

== Playoff bracket ==
In each round, teams competed in a best-of-seven series following a 2–2–1–1–1 format (scores in the bracket indicate the number of games won in each best-of-seven series). The team with home ice advantage played at home for games one and two (and games five and seven, if necessary), and the other team played at home for games three and four (and game six, if necessary). The top eight teams in each conference made the playoffs, with the three division winners seeded 1–3 based on regular season record, and the five remaining teams seeded 4–8.

The NHL used "re-seeding" instead of a fixed bracket playoff system. During the first three rounds, the highest remaining seed in each conference was matched against the lowest remaining seed, the second-highest remaining seed played the second-lowest remaining seed, and so forth. The higher-seeded team was awarded home ice advantage. The two conference winners then advanced to the Stanley Cup Final, where home ice advantage was awarded to the team that had the better regular season record.

Conference quarterfinals	Conference semifinals
1	Buffalo	4
8	NY Islanders	1
1	Buffalo	4
6	NY Rangers	2
2	New Jersey	4
7	Tampa Bay	2
Eastern Conference
3	Atlanta	0
6	NY Rangers	4
2	New Jersey	1
4	Ottawa	4
4	Ottawa	4
5	Pittsburgh	1
1	Detroit	4
8	Calgary	2
1	Detroit	4
5	San Jose	2
2	Anaheim	4
7	Minnesota	1
Western Conference
3	Vancouver	4
6	Dallas	3
2	Anaheim	4
3	Vancouver	1
4	Nashville	1
5	San Jose	4

Conference finals
1	Buffalo	1
4	Ottawa	4
1	Detroit	2
2	Anaheim	4

Stanley Cup Final
E4	Ottawa	1
W2	Anaheim	4

== Conference quarterfinals ==
=== Eastern Conference quarterfinals ===
==== (1) Buffalo Sabres vs. (8) New York Islanders ====
The Buffalo Sabres entered the playoffs as the Presidents' Trophy winners (winning the tie-breaker with Detroit in total wins), the Eastern Conference regular season and Northeast Division champions with 113 points. The Islanders qualified as the eighth seed earning 92 points during the regular season. This was the fourth and most recent playoff meeting between these two teams, with New York winning all three of the previous series. They last met in the 1980 Stanley Cup Semifinals where New York won in six games. Buffalo won three of the four games during this year's regular season series.

The Sabres defeated the Islanders in five games. Brian Campbell and Chris Drury each scored twice for the Sabres in game one as they took the opening game 4–1. Marc-Andre Bergeron's power play goal at 8:37 of the third period gave the Islanders the lead in game two as they evened the series with a 3–2 victory. Sabres forward Daniel Briere scored the game-winning goal with a two-man advantage in the second period of game three giving Buffalo a 3–2 win. Chris Drury scored two goals in a game for the second time in this series as the Sabres won game four by a final score of 4–2. Buffalo held off a late charge by the Islanders in game five as they eliminated New York with a 4–3 win.

April 12	New York Islanders	1–4	Buffalo Sabres	HSBC Arena	Recap
No scoring		First period	09:30 – Brian Campbell (1)
Arron Asham (1) – 06:58		Second period	11:13 – pp – Chris Drury (1)
No scoring		Third period	01:08 – Chris Drury (2); 16:35 – pp – Brian Campbell (2)
Wade Dubielewicz 31 saves / 35 shots		Goalie stats	Ryan Miller 20 saves / 21 shots

April 14	New York Islanders	3–2	Buffalo Sabres	HSBC Arena	Recap
Trent Hunter (1) – 03:07; Bruno Gervais (1) – 11:03		First period	18:58 – Toni Lydman (1)
No scoring		Second period	No scoring
Marc-Andre Bergeron (1) – pp – 08:37		Third period	02:12 – Dmitri Kalinin (1)
Rick DiPietro 32 saves / 34 shots		Goalie stats	Ryan Miller 29 saves / 32 shots

April 16	Buffalo Sabres	3–2	New York Islanders	Nassau Coliseum	Recap
No scoring		First period	No scoring
Adam Mair (1) – 05:17; Thomas Vanek (1) – 08:38; Daniel Briere (1) – pp – 12:56		Second period	09:52 – Trent Hunter (2); 19:52 – Ryan Smyth (1)
No scoring		Third period	No scoring
Ryan Miller 20 saves / 22 shots		Goalie stats	Rick DiPietro 32 saves / 35 shots

April 18	Buffalo Sabres	4–2	New York Islanders	Nassau Coliseum	Recap
Thomas Vanek (2) – 11:17; Chris Drury (3) – 13:05		First period	06:24 – Jason Blake (1); 19:44 – pp – Mike Sillinger (1)
Chris Drury (4) – pp – 00:39		Second period	No scoring
Jason Pominville (1) – 18:48		Third period	No scoring
Ryan Miller 24 saves / 26 shots		Goalie stats	Rick DiPietro 27 saves / 31 shots

April 20	New York Islanders	3–4	Buffalo Sabres	HSBC Arena	Recap
No scoring		First period	15:04 – Drew Stafford (1)
No scoring		Second period	00:39 – Jason Pominville (2); 11:29 – Derek Roy (1)
Miroslav Satan (1) – 04:22; Trent Hunter (3) – 09:43; Chris Campoli (1) – 13:07		Third period	06:38 – Maxim Afinogenov (1)
Rick DiPietro 23 saves / 27 shots		Goalie stats	Ryan Miller 30 saves / 33 shots

Buffalo won series 4–1

==== (2) New Jersey Devils vs. (7) Tampa Bay Lightning ====
The New Jersey Devils entered the playoffs as the Atlantic Division champions, earning the second seed in the Eastern Conference with 107 points. Tampa Bay qualified as the seventh seed, earning 93 points during the regular season. This was the second meeting between these two teams, with New Jersey winning the only previous series in the 2003 Eastern Conference semifinals in five games. Tampa Bay won three of the four games during this year's regular season series.

The Devils defeated the Lightning in six games. New Jersey forward Zach Parise scored twice as New Jersey took game one 5–3. Johan Holmqvist made 34 saves for the Lightning and Vincent Lecavalier scored the game-winning goal early in the third period of game two as Tampa Bay evened the series with a 3–2 victory. The teams traded goals early in the third period of game three before Vaclav Prospal broke the tie with 6:29 remaining in regulation time as the Lightning won again by a score of 3–2. Devils centre Scott Gomez scored the overtime winner at 12:54 in game four to tie the series. New Jersey goaltender Martin Brodeur made 31 saves in his 22nd career playoff shutout as the Devils won game five 3–0. Devils forward Brian Gionta scored the series-winning goal in game six as New Jersey took the series four games to two with a 3–2 win.

April 12	Tampa Bay Lightning	3–5	New Jersey Devils	Continental Airlines Arena	Recap
Martin St. Louis (1) – pp – 15:55		First period	07:43 – Zach Parise (1); 12:31 – pp – Patrik Elias (1)
Vincent Lecavalier (1) – 11:46		Second period	03:36 – pp – Brian Rafalski (1)
Vincent Lecavalier (2) – 02:51		Third period	03:54 – Zach Parise (2); 18:38 – Brian Gionta (1)
Johan Holmqvist 19 saves / 24 shots		Goalie stats	Martin Brodeur 23 saves / 26 shots

April 14	Tampa Bay Lightning	3–2	New Jersey Devils	Continental Airlines Arena	Recap
Filip Kuba (1) – sh – 09:02		First period	18:11 – pp – Zach Parise (3)
Martin St. Louis (2) – 19:11		Second period	16:19 – pp – Jamie Langenbrunner (1)
Vincent Lecavalier (3) – 01:42		Third period	No scoring
Johan Holmqvist 34 saves / 36 shots		Goalie stats	Martin Brodeur 17 saves / 20 shots

April 16	New Jersey Devils	2–3	Tampa Bay Lightning	St. Pete Times Forum	Recap
No scoring		First period	09:06 – pp – Vincent Lecavalier (4)
John Madden (1) – 17:27		Second period	No scoring
Zach Parise (4) – 04:46		Third period	01:09 – Brad Richards (1); 13:31 – Vaclav Prospal (1)
Martin Brodeur 21 saves / 24 shots		Goalie stats	Johan Holmqvist 30 saves / 32 shots

April 18	New Jersey Devils	4–3	OT	Tampa Bay Lightning	St. Pete Times Forum	Recap
Brian Gionta (2) – 06:04; Zach Parise (5) – 14:20		First period		12:08 – Eric Perrin (1)
Zach Parise (6) – pp – 09:42		Second period		11:39 – Martin St. Louis (3); 15:20 – Vincent Lecavalier (5)
No scoring		Third period		No scoring
Scott Gomez (1) – 12:54		First overtime period		No scoring
Martin Brodeur 30 saves / 33 shots		Goalie stats		Johan Holmqvist 33 saves / 37 shots

April 20	Tampa Bay Lightning	0–3	New Jersey Devils	Continental Airlines Arena	Recap
No scoring		First period	12:46 – Andy Greene (1)
No scoring		Second period	09:59 – Brian Gionta (3)
No scoring		Third period	18:13 – en – Scott Gomez (2)
Johan Holmqvist 11 saves / 13 shots		Goalie stats	Martin Brodeur 31 saves / 31 shots

April 22	New Jersey Devils	3–2	Tampa Bay Lightning	St. Pete Times Forum	Recap
Brian Gionta (4) – pp – 14:29		First period	No scoring
Brian Rafalski (2) – pp – 01:21; Brian Gionta (5) – 05:49		Second period	05:10 – pp – Brad Richards (2); 10:46 – pp – Brad Richards (3)
No scoring		Third period	No scoring
Martin Brodeur 32 saves / 34 shots		Goalie stats	Johan Holmqvist 23 saves / 26 shots

New Jersey won series 4–2

==== (3) Atlanta Thrashers vs. (6) New York Rangers ====
The Atlanta Thrashers entered the playoffs as the Southeast Division champions, earning the third seed in the Eastern Conference with 97 points. The Rangers qualified as the sixth seed earning 94 points during the regular season. This was the first and to this date only playoff meeting between these two teams. This series also marked the first appearance of a team representing Atlanta in the Stanley Cup playoffs in 27 years. The most recent team to represent Atlanta prior to this was the Atlanta Flames who lost in the Preliminary Round in 1980. The Thrashers made their first playoff appearance since entering the league in the 1999–2000 season; this was the only playoff appearance that Atlanta made before the franchise relocated to Winnipeg in 2011. Atlanta won three of the four games during this year's regular season series.

The Rangers swept Atlanta in four games. New York entered the third period of game one with a two-goal lead and hung on to win by a score of 4–3. Ranger forward Brendan Shanahan scored the game-winner with four minutes remaining in game two as New York earned a 2–1 victory. The Rangers dominated Atlanta in game three winning 7–0, Michael Nylander scored a hat trick in the victory. Matt Cullen scored the series-clinching goal in game four and Jaromir Jagr added an empty-net goal in the dying minutes as New York completed the sweep of the Thrashers with a 4–2 win.

April 12	New York Rangers	4–3	Atlanta Thrashers	Philips Arena	Recap
Jaromir Jagr (1) – 12:50; Michal Rozsival (1) – pp – 16:47		First period	19:01 – pp – Eric Belanger (1)
Marcel Hossa (1) – 10:52; Michael Nylander (1) – 16:56		Second period	12:19 – Shane Hnidy (1)
No scoring		Third period	05:50 – Pascal Dupuis (1)
Henrik Lundqvist 21 saves / 24 shots		Goalie stats	Kari Lehtonen 34 saves / 38 shots

April 14	New York Rangers	2–1	Atlanta Thrashers	Philips Arena	Recap
Sean Avery (1) – 08:08		First period	No scoring
No scoring		Second period	No scoring
Brendan Shanahan (1) – 15:59		Third period	05:35 – Ilya Kovalchuk (1)
Henrik Lundqvist 27 saves / 28 shots		Goalie stats	Johan Hedberg 37 saves / 39 shots

April 17	Atlanta Thrashers	0–7	New York Rangers	Madison Square Garden	Recap
No scoring		First period	00:32 – Michael Nylander (2); 09:45 – Michael Nylander (3); 12:26 – Marek Malik (1)
No scoring		Second period	06:27 – Ryan Callahan (1); 17:21 – pp – Ryan Callahan (2)
No scoring		Third period	08:58 – pp – Brendan Shanahan (2); 15:54 – pp – Michael Nylander (4)
Kari Lehtonen 28 saves / 35 shots		Goalie stats	Henrik Lundqvist 21 saves / 21 shots

April 18	Atlanta Thrashers	2–4	New York Rangers	Madison Square Garden	Recap
Keith Tkachuk (1) – 06:38		First period	07:57 – pp – Michal Rozsival (2)
Greg De Vries (1) – 12:26		Second period	18:18 – Brendan Shanahan (3)
No scoring		Third period	02:06 – Matt Cullen (1); 18:27 – en – Jaromir Jagr (2)
Johan Hedberg 27 saves / 30 shots		Goalie stats	Henrik Lundqvist 24 saves / 26 shots

New York won series 4–0

==== (4) Ottawa Senators vs. (5) Pittsburgh Penguins ====
Both the Ottawa Senators and Pittsburgh Penguins entered the playoffs tied with 105 points, but the Senators were awarded the fourth seed by winning the total wins tiebreaker (48–47). This was the first playoff meeting between these two teams. The Penguins qualified for the playoffs for the first time since 2001. Pittsburgh won this year's four-game regular season series earning six of eight points.

The Senators defeated the Penguins in five games. Penguins goaltender Marc-Andre Fleury was pulled in game one after allowing six goals to the Senators in a 6–3 loss. The Penguins scored three times in the third period as they overcame a one-goal deficit to defeat Ottawa 4–3 in game two and tie the series. Senators captain Daniel Alfredsson scored the game-winner and added an insurance goal in game three as Ottawa regained home-ice advantage with a 4–2 win. Just over nine minutes into the third period of game four, Anton Volchenkov broke the tie for the Senators giving his team a 2–1 victory. After a scoreless opening period in game five, the Senators struck three times in the second period and goaltender Ray Emery posted a 20-save shutout to eliminate the Penguins with a 3–0 win.

April 11	Pittsburgh Penguins	3–6	Ottawa Senators	Scotiabank Place	Recap
No scoring		First period	01:37 – Andrej Meszaros (1); 06:38 – Chris Kelly (1)
Jordan Staal (1) – 16:58		Second period	14:38 – pp – Tom Preissing (1)
Sergei Gonchar (1) – pp – 12:42; Sidney Crosby (1) – pp – 19:11		Third period	00:09 – pp – Dany Heatley (1); 05:39 – Chris Neil (1); 08:22 – Mike Comrie (1)
Marc-Andre Fleury 30 saves / 36 shots Jocelyn Thibault 1 save / 1 shot		Goalie stats	Ray Emery 23 saves / 26 shots

April 14	Pittsburgh Penguins	4–3	Ottawa Senators	Scotiabank Place	Recap
Ryan Whitney (1) – pp – 03:01		First period	No scoring
No scoring		Second period	08:28 – Jason Spezza (1); 16:44 – pp – Daniel Alfredsson (1)
Gary Roberts (1) – pp – 02:04; Jordan Staal (2) – 09:34; Sidney Crosby (2) – 11:44		Third period	06:18 – Chris Kelly (2)
Marc-Andre Fleury 34 saves / 37 shots		Goalie stats	Ray Emery 17 saves / 21 shots

April 15	Ottawa Senators	4–2	Pittsburgh Penguins	Mellon Arena	Recap
Dean McAmmond (1) – 18:04		First period	00:52 – Gary Roberts (2)
Mike Comrie (2) – 02:13; Daniel Alfredsson (2) – pp – 07:20; Daniel Alfredsson (3) – 17:12		Second period	No scoring
No scoring		Third period	14:40 – Sidney Crosby (3)
Ray Emery 17 saves / 19 shots		Goalie stats	Marc-Andre Fleury 21 saves / 25 shots

April 17	Ottawa Senators	2–1	Pittsburgh Penguins	Mellon Arena	Recap
Jason Spezza (2) – pp – 03:25		First period	No scoring
No scoring		Second period	08:08 – Jordan Staal (3)
Anton Volchenkov (1) – 09:12		Third period	No scoring
Ray Emery 23 saves / 24 shots		Goalie stats	Marc-Andre Fleury 24 saves / 26 shots

April 19	Pittsburgh Penguins	0–3	Ottawa Senators	Scotiabank Place	Recap
No scoring		First period	No scoring
No scoring		Second period	01:08 – pp – Dany Heatley (2); 06:20 – Antoine Vermette (1); 17:55 – Chris Kelly (3)
No scoring		Third period	No scoring
Marc-Andre Fleury 23 saves / 26 shots		Goalie stats	Ray Emery 20 saves / 20 shots

Ottawa won series 4–1

=== Western Conference quarterfinals ===
==== (1) Detroit Red Wings vs. (8) Calgary Flames ====
The Detroit Red Wings entered the playoffs as the Western Conference regular season and Central Division champions (losing the tie-breaker with Buffalo in total wins for the Presidents' Trophy) with 113 points. Calgary qualified as the eighth seed earning 96 points during the regular season. This was the third and most recent playoff meeting between these two teams, with the teams splitting the two previous series. They last met in the 2004 Western Conference semifinals where Calgary won in six games. The teams split this year's four-game regular season series.

The Red Wings eliminated the Flames in six games. In game one the Red Wings dominated the Flames in a 4–1 victory. Flames goaltender Miikka Kiprusoff made 48 saves in game two as his team lost 3–1 and the Red Wings took a 2–0 series lead. Jarome Iginla scored the game-winning goal in game three as the Flames won by a score of 3–2. Calgary centre Daymond Langkow scored twice on the power play in game four as the Flames evened the series with a 3–2 win. After allowing five goals against in game five Flames goaltender Miikka Kiprusoff was pulled in favour of backup Jamie McLennan. Kiprusoff was forced back into the game just 18 seconds later as Jamie McLennan was assessed a match penalty and game misconduct for slashing Red Wings forward Johan Franzen in the stomach. McLennan was later suspended for five games; the Flames organization and Head Coach Jim Playfair were also fined after a 5–1 loss. Johan Franzen scored the series-winner in double overtime in game six as the Red Wings eliminated the Flames with a 2–1 victory.

April 12	Calgary Flames	1–4	Detroit Red Wings	Joe Louis Arena	Recap
No scoring		First period	04:51 – Valtteri Filppula (1); 08:36 – pp – Nicklas Lidstrom (1)
No scoring		Second period	06:56 – Pavel Datsyuk (1); 09:57 – Mathieu Schneider (1)
Alex Tanguay (1) – pp – 14:55		Third period	No scoring
Miikka Kiprusoff 42 saves / 46 shots		Goalie stats	Dominik Hasek 19 saves / 20 shots

April 15	Calgary Flames	1–3	Detroit Red Wings	Joe Louis Arena	Recap
No scoring		First period	01:02 – Pavel Datsyuk (2); 03:50 – pp – Nicklas Lidstrom (2)
Dion Phaneuf (1) – pp – 02:42		Second period	No scoring
No scoring		Third period	06:05 – Valtteri Filppula (2)
Miikka Kiprusoff 48 saves / 51 shots		Goalie stats	Dominik Hasek 14 saves / 15 shots

April 17	Detroit Red Wings	2–3	Calgary Flames	Pengrowth Saddledome	Recap
No scoring		First period	No scoring
Kris Draper (1) – 11:30		Second period	09:20 – pp – Matthew Lombardi (1)
Kris Draper (2) – 00:39		Third period	04:43 – pp – Mark Giordano (1); 09:21 – Jarome Iginla (1)
Dominik Hasek 25 saves / 28 shots		Goalie stats	Miikka Kiprusoff 28 saves / 30 shots

April 19	Detroit Red Wings	2–3	Calgary Flames	Pengrowth Saddledome	Recap
Todd Bertuzzi (1) – 11:07; Johan Franzen (1) – 15:37		First period	08:29 – pp – Daymond Langkow (1); 13:33 – Craig Conroy (1)
No scoring		Second period	08:19 – pp – Daymond Langkow (2)
No scoring		Third period	No scoring
Dominik Hasek 18 saves / 21 shots		Goalie stats	Miikka Kiprusoff 33 saves / 35 shots

April 21	Calgary Flames	1–5	Detroit Red Wings	Joe Louis Arena	Recap
No scoring		First period	No scoring
No scoring		Second period	03:32 – sh-ps – Daniel Cleary (1); 08:50 – pp – Henrik Zetterberg (1); 10:54 – sh – Chris Chelios (1)
Andrei Zyuzin (1) – sh – 10:03		Third period	05:12 – pp – Henrik Zetterberg (2); 15:42 – pp – Pavel Datsyuk (3)
Miikka Kiprusoff 33 saves / 38 shots Jamie McLennan 0 saves / 0 shots		Goalie stats	Dominik Hasek 23 saves / 24 shots

April 22	Detroit Red Wings	2–1	2OT	Calgary Flames	Pengrowth Saddledome	Recap
No scoring		First period		No scoring
Robert Lang (1) – 16:53		Second period		03:09 – Jarome Iginla (2)
No scoring		Third period		No scoring
Johan Franzen (2) – 04:23		Second overtime period		No scoring
Dominik Hasek 20 saves / 21 shots		Goalie stats		Miikka Kiprusoff 53 saves / 55 shots

Detroit won series 4–2

==== (2) Anaheim Ducks vs. (7) Minnesota Wild ====
The Anaheim Ducks entered the playoffs as the Pacific Division champions, earning the second seed in the Western Conference with 110 points. Minnesota qualified as the seventh seed earning 104 points during the regular season. This was the second and most recent playoff meeting between these two teams, with Anaheim winning the only previous series. They last met in the 2003 Western Conference Final where Anaheim won in four games. Anaheim won this year's four-game regular season series earning five of eight points.

The Ducks eliminated the Wild in five games. Ducks forward Dustin Penner scored the game-winner late in the third period as Anaheim took game one 2–1. In game two Francois Beauchemin scored twice on the power-play for the Ducks as they took a 2–0 series lead with a 3–2 win. The Ducks earned a tight win in game three with a 2–1 victory. The Wild avoided elimination with a three-goal third period in game four, earning a 4–1 win. Jean-Sebastien Giguere started game five for the Ducks and Ryan Getzlaf scored the series-winning goal late in the second period as Anaheim ended the series with a 4–1 victory.

April 11	Minnesota Wild	1–2	Anaheim Ducks	Honda Center	Recap
No scoring		First period	No scoring
Pavol Demitra (1) – 06:01		Second period	09:52 – Teemu Selanne (1)
No scoring		Third period	14:40 – Dustin Penner (1)
Niklas Backstrom 32 saves / 34 shots		Goalie stats	Ilya Bryzgalov 24 saves / 25 shots

April 13	Minnesota Wild	2–3	Anaheim Ducks	Honda Center	Recap
No scoring		First period	13:19 – pp – Francois Beauchemin (1)
Marian Gaborik (1) – 03:33		Second period	16:17 – pp – Francois Beauchemin (2); 18:43 – sh – Ryan Getzlaf (1)
Mikko Koivu (1) – 15:04		Third period	No scoring
Niklas Backstrom 22 saves / 25 shots		Goalie stats	Ilya Bryzgalov 30 saves / 32 shots

April 15	Anaheim Ducks	2–1	Minnesota Wild	Xcel Energy Center	Recap
Andy McDonald (1) – pp – 16:05		First period	No scoring
No scoring		Second period	No scoring
Rob Niedermayer (1) – 09:43		Third period	19:21 – pp – Petteri Nummelin (1)
Ilya Bryzgalov 19 saves / 20 shots		Goalie stats	Niklas Backstrom 17 saves / 19 shots

April 17	Anaheim Ducks	1–4	Minnesota Wild	Xcel Energy Center	Recap
No scoring		First period	No scoring
Chris Pronger (1) – pp – 06:08		Second period	18:03 – Pierre-Marc Bouchard (1)
No scoring		Third period	03:23 – pp – Marian Gaborik (2); 09:27 – Brian Rolston (1); 10:44 – Mark Parrish (1)
Ilya Bryzgalov 32 saves / 36 shots Jean-Sebastien Giguere 4 saves / 4 shots		Goalie stats	Niklas Backstrom 28 saves / 29 shots

April 19	Minnesota Wild	1–4	Anaheim Ducks	Honda Center	Recap
No scoring		First period	01:02 – Chris Pronger (2)
Marian Gaborik (3) – sh – 15:42		Second period	16:29 – pp – Ryan Getzlaf (2)
No scoring		Third period	10:29 – Corey Perry (1); 19:03 – en – Travis Moen (1)
Niklas Backstrom 35 saves / 38 shots		Goalie stats	Jean-Sebastien Giguere 26 saves / 27 shots

Anaheim won series 4–1

==== (3) Vancouver Canucks vs. (6) Dallas Stars ====
The Vancouver Canucks entered the playoffs as the Northwest Division champions, earning the third seed in the Western Conference with 105 points. Dallas qualified as the sixth seed earning 107 points (losing the tie-breaker with San Jose in total wins) during the regular season. This was the second and most recent playoff meeting between these two teams with Vancouver winning the only previous series. They last met in the 1994 Western Conference semifinals where Vancouver won in five games. The teams split this year's four-game regular season series.

Vancouver hung on to defeat the Stars in seven games. Dallas overcame a two-goal deficit in game one to force overtime, however, they came up short as Henrik Sedin won the game for Vancouver when he scored at 18:06 of the fourth overtime; this is the eighth-longest playoff game in NHL history. Roberto Luongo made 72 saves in the 5–4 Canucks victory. The Stars opened game two with a goal just 24 seconds in and the Canucks were not able to recover as Dallas goaltender Marty Turco posted a 35 save shutout in a 2–0 win. Canucks forward Taylor Pyatt scored the game-winner at 7:47 of the first overtime for a 2–1 win in game three. The Canucks pulled out another 2–1 victory in game four as Mattias Ohlund and Trevor Linden scored for Vancouver. In game five both Roberto Luongo and Marty Turco pushed aside every shot in regulation and Stars captain Brenden Morrow scored the only goal of the game 6:22 into the first overtime for a 1–0 Dallas victory. Marty Turco shutout Vancouver in game six for the second consecutive game and the third time overall in the series as the Stars forced a seventh game with a 2–0 win. After allowing the opening goal in game seven the Canucks scored four unanswered goals and took the deciding game of the series 4–1 for their first playoff series victory since 2003. Vancouver was the first team since the Detroit Red Wings in 1950 to win a series despite getting shutout 3 times.

April 11	Dallas Stars	4–5	4OT	Vancouver Canucks	General Motors Place	Recap
Brenden Morrow (1) – pp – 05:28		First period		04:20 – Daniel Sedin (1)
Trevor Daley (1) – 10:00		Second period		06:26 – pp – Mattias Ohlund (1); 13:47 – Markus Naslund (1)
Antti Miettinen (1) – 08:31; Ladislav Nagy (1) – 13:46		Third period		07:36 – Bryan Smolinski (1)
No scoring		Fourth overtime period		18:06 – Henrik Sedin (1)
Marty Turco 51 saves / 56 shots		Goalie stats		Roberto Luongo 72 saves / 76 shots

April 13	Dallas Stars	2–0	Vancouver Canucks	General Motors Place	Recap
Jeff Halpern (1) – 00:24		First period	No scoring
Joel Lundqvist (1) – 00:45		Second period	No scoring
No scoring		Third period	No scoring
Marty Turco 35 saves / 35 shots		Goalie stats	Roberto Luongo 25 saves / 27 shots

April 15	Vancouver Canucks	2–1	OT	Dallas Stars	American Airlines Center	Recap
No scoring		First period		No scoring
No scoring		Second period		13:09 – pp – Stu Barnes (1)
Jan Bulis (1) – 05:18		Third period		No scoring
Taylor Pyatt (1) – 07:47		First overtime period		No scoring
Roberto Luongo 29 saves / 30 shots		Goalie stats		Marty Turco 35 saves / 37 shots

April 17	Vancouver Canucks	2–1	Dallas Stars	American Airlines Center	Recap
No scoring		First period	No scoring
No scoring		Second period	No scoring
Mattias Ohlund (2) – 09:46; Trevor Linden (1) – 14:29		Third period	12:29 – Darryl Sydor (1)
Roberto Luongo 26 saves / 27 shots		Goalie stats	Marty Turco 27 saves / 29 shots

April 19	Dallas Stars	1–0	OT	Vancouver Canucks	General Motors Place	Recap
No scoring		First period		No scoring
No scoring		Second period		No scoring
No scoring		Third period		No scoring
Brenden Morrow (2) – pp – 06:22		First overtime period		No scoring
Marty Turco 21 saves / 21 shots		Goalie stats		Roberto Luongo 29 saves / 30 shots

April 21	Vancouver Canucks	0–2	Dallas Stars	American Airlines Center	Recap
No scoring		First period	03:05 – pp – Mike Modano (1)
No scoring		Second period	No scoring
No scoring		Third period	07:22 – Jeff Halpern (2)
Roberto Luongo 28 saves / 30 shots		Goalie stats	Marty Turco 21 saves / 21 shots

April 23	Dallas Stars	1–4	Vancouver Canucks	General Motors Place	Recap
Joel Lundqvist (2) – 16:32		First period	No scoring
No scoring		Second period	15:12 – pp – Henrik Sedin (2)
No scoring		Third period	07:00 – pp – Trevor Linden (2); 18:57 – en – Taylor Pyatt (2); 19:13 – en – Bryan Smolinski (1)
Marty Turco 28 saves / 30 shots		Goalie stats	Roberto Luongo 19 saves / 20 shots

Vancouver won series 4–3

==== (4) Nashville Predators vs. (5) San Jose Sharks ====
The Nashville Predators entered the playoffs as the fourth seed in the Western Conference with 110 points. San Jose qualified as the fifth seed earning 107 points (winning the tie-breaker with Dallas in total wins) during the regular season. This was the second playoff meeting between these two teams with San Jose winning the only previous series. They last met in the previous year's Western Conference quarterfinals where San Jose won in five games. Nashville won three of the four games during this year's regular season series.

For the second consecutive year, the Sharks eliminated Nashville in five games. Patrick Rissmiller scored the overtime winner for San Jose at 8:14 of the second overtime period as the Sharks won a high-scoring game one 5–4. Predator forwards Jean-Pierre Dumont and Peter Forsberg scored twice in game two as Nashville evened the series with a 5–2 win. Nashville goaltender Tomas Vokoun made 38 saves in a losing effort in game three as the Sharks won the game 3–1. Milan Michalek's second goal of the game gave the Sharks an insurmountable lead in game four as San Jose took a 3–2 victory. The teams were tied late into the third period of game five before Sharks captain Patrick Marleau scored the series-winning goal to eliminate the Predators by a final score of 3–2.

April 11	San Jose Sharks	5–4	2OT	Nashville Predators	Gaylord Entertainment Center	Recap
Matt Carle (1) – 07:18		First period		No scoring
Mike Grier (1) – 05:31; Craig Rivet (1) – pp – 12:57; Milan Michalek (1) – 15:52		Second period		02:35 – Alexander Radulov (1); 03:56 – Jean-Pierre Dumont (1)
No scoring		Third period		13:05 – Alexander Radulov (2); 19:09 – Jean-Pierre Dumont (2)
Patrick Rissmiller (1) – 08:14		Second overtime period		No scoring
Evgeni Nabokov 39 saves / 43 shots		Goalie stats		Tomas Vokoun 33 saves / 38 shots

April 13	San Jose Sharks	2–5	Nashville Predators	Gaylord Entertainment Center	Recap
Craig Rivet (2) – 04:37		First period	06:54 – Alexander Radulov (3); 15:56 – Peter Forsberg (1)
No scoring		Second period	10:26 – sh – Jean-Pierre Dumont (3); 12:56 – pp – Jean-Pierre Dumont (4)
Ryan Clowe (1) – 09:52		Third period	18:55 – en – Peter Forsberg (2)
Evgeni Nabokov 17 saves / 21 shots		Goalie stats	Tomas Vokoun 22 saves / 24 shots

April 16	Nashville Predators	1–3	San Jose Sharks	HP Pavilion	Recap
Ryan Suter (1) – 11:53		First period	No scoring
No scoring		Second period	08:38 – Milan Michalek (2); 12:18 – Ryan Clowe (2)
No scoring		Third period	15:34 – Patrick Marleau (1)
Tomas Vokoun 38 saves / 41 shots		Goalie stats	Evgeni Nabokov 19 saves / 20 shots

April 18	Nashville Predators	2–3	San Jose Sharks	HP Pavilion	Recap
No scoring		First period	03:29 – Milan Michalek (3)
Jason Arnott (1) – 02:32		Second period	01:06 – Joe Pavelski (1); 12:53 – Milan Michalek (4)
Scott Hartnell (1) – pp – 17:08		Third period	No scoring
Tomas Vokoun 20 saves / 23 shots		Goalie stats	Evgeni Nabokov 23 saves / 25 shots

April 20	San Jose Sharks	3–2	Nashville Predators	Gaylord Entertainment Center	Recap
Ryan Clowe (3) – 08:21		First period	No scoring
Patrick Marleau (2) – pp – 17:46		Second period	03:47 – pp – Jason Arnott (2); 04:26 – Vernon Fiddler (1)
Patrick Marleau (3) – 15:39		Third period	No scoring
Evgeni Nabokov 22 saves / 24 shots		Goalie stats	Tomas Vokoun 34 saves / 37 shots

San Jose won series 4–1

== Conference semifinals ==
=== Eastern Conference semifinals ===
==== (1) Buffalo Sabres vs. (6) New York Rangers ====
This was the second and most recent playoff meeting between these two teams with Buffalo winning the only previous series. They last met in the 1978 Preliminary Round where Buffalo won in three games. Buffalo won all four games during this year's regular season series.

Buffalo eliminated the Rangers in six games. Sabres forward Thomas Vanek scored twice including the game-winner as Buffalo took game one 5–2. Chris Drury and Thomas Vanek each scored their fifth goal of the playoffs for the Sabres in the third period of game two as Buffalo overcame a goal deficit, winning by a score of 3–2. In game three Michal Rozsival gave the Rangers a 2–1 win in double overtime by scoring at 16:43. The Rangers scored twice on the power-play in game four as they evened the series with a 2–1 victory. Sabres co-captain Chris Drury scored the tying goal with less than eight seconds remaining and Maxim Afinogenov ended the game 4:39 into the first overtime on the power-play as Buffalo won game five 2–1. Jochen Hecht's second goal of the playoffs was the series-clinching goal as the Sabres ended New York's season with 5–4 victory in game six.

Until 2026, this was the last time the Sabres won a playoff series, and with the Toronto Maple Leafs winning their first round series against the Tampa Bay Lightning in 2023, the Sabres held the longest active playoff series win drought.

April 25	New York Rangers	2–5	Buffalo Sabres	HSBC Arena	Recap
No scoring		First period	No scoring
No scoring		Second period	14:19 – pp – Thomas Vanek (3); 16:19 – Ales Kotalik (1); 18:24 – Thomas Vanek (4)
Marcel Hossa (2) – 10:44; Brendan Shanahan (4) – pp – 19:12		Third period	13:47 – Jason Pominville (3); 19:44 – en – Drew Stafford (2)
Henrik Lundqvist 32 saves / 36 shots		Goalie stats	Ryan Miller 32 saves / 34 shots

April 27	New York Rangers	2–3	Buffalo Sabres	HSBC Arena	Recap
Martin Straka (1) – pp – 10:08		First period	10:58 – pp – Brian Campbell (3)
Paul Mara (1) – pp – 18:40		Second period	No scoring
No scoring		Third period	00:24 – Chris Drury (5); 10:11 – Thomas Vanek (5)
Henrik Lundqvist 15 saves / 18 shots		Goalie stats	Ryan Miller 31 saves / 33 shots

April 29	Buffalo Sabres	1–2	2OT	New York Rangers	Madison Square Garden	Recap
No scoring		First period		No scoring
No scoring		Second period		00:33 – Jaromir Jagr (3)
Daniel Briere (2) – pp – 12:14		Third period		No scoring
No scoring		Second overtime period		16:43 – Michal Rozsival (3)
Ryan Miller 44 saves / 46 shots		Goalie stats		Henrik Lundqvist 38 saves / 39 shots

May 1	Buffalo Sabres	1–2	New York Rangers	Madison Square Garden	Recap
No scoring		First period	No scoring
No scoring		Second period	00:45 – pp – Jaromir Jagr (4)
Ales Kotalik (2) – 09:04		Third period	08:31 – pp – Brendan Shanahan (5)
Ryan Miller 26 saves / 28 shots		Goalie stats	Henrik Lundqvist 29 saves / 30 shots

May 4	New York Rangers	1–2	OT	Buffalo Sabres	HSBC Arena	Recap
No scoring		First period		No scoring
No scoring		Second period		No scoring
Martin Straka (2) – 16:41		Third period		19:52 – Chris Drury (6)
No scoring		First overtime period		04:39 – pp – Maxim Afinogenov (2)
Henrik Lundqvist 38 saves / 40 shots		Goalie stats		Ryan Miller 22 saves / 23 shots

May 6	Buffalo Sabres	5–4	New York Rangers	Madison Square Garden	Recap
No scoring		First period	17:10 – Michael Nylander (5)
Dmitri Kalinin (2) – 01:29; Jason Pominville (4) – 02:53; Jochen Hecht (1) – 07:41; Chris Drury (7) – pp – 11:15		Second period	04:40 – pp – Paul Mara (2)
Jochen Hecht (2) – 14:50		Third period	05:08 – pp – Jaromir Jagr (5); 17:09 – pp – Michael Nylander (6)
Ryan Miller 32 saves / 36 shots		Goalie stats	Henrik Lundqvist 24 saves / 29 shots

Buffalo won series 4–2

==== (2) New Jersey Devils vs. (4) Ottawa Senators ====
This was the third and most recent playoff meeting between these two teams with the teams splitting the two previous series. They last met in the 2003 Eastern Conference Final where New Jersey won in seven games. New Jersey won three of the four games during this year's regular season series.

Ottawa defeated the Devils in five games. The Senators scored four times in the opening period of game one and hung on to win the game 5–4. The Senators tied game two late in the third period, but Jamie Langenbrunner scored the winning goal for the Devils 1:55 into the second overtime. Game three remained scoreless into the third period before Tom Preissing put the Senators on the board, Ray Emery made 25 saves for his second playoff shutout in a 2–0 Ottawa win. New Jersey goaltender Martin Brodeur made 33 saves in a losing effort in game four as the Senators won 3–2. Ottawa captain Daniel Alfredsson scored the series-winning goal late in the second period of game five as the Senators ended New Jersey's season with a 3–2 win. Game five was also the final game played at Continental Airlines Arena as the Devils began playing at the Prudential Center the following year.

April 26	Ottawa Senators	5–4	New Jersey Devils	Continental Airlines Arena	Recap
Jason Spezza (3) – 01:30; Joe Corvo (1) – pp – 06:49; Dean McAmmond (2) – sh – 14:43; Dany Heatley (3) – 16:39		First period	17:38 – Travis Zajac (1)
No scoring		Second period	02:20 – Brian Gionta (6); 04:57 – Andy Greene (2)
Wade Redden (1) – pp – 00:43		Third period	19:30 – Zach Parise (7)
Ray Emery 26 saves / 30 shots		Goalie stats	Martin Brodeur 21 saves / 26 shots

April 28	Ottawa Senators	2–3	2OT	New Jersey Devils	Continental Airlines Arena	Recap
No scoring		First period		01:43 – pp – Brian Gionta (7); 19:59 – pp – Sergei Brylin (1)
Daniel Alfredsson (4) – pp – 04:23		Second period		No scoring
Dany Heatley (4) – 19:33		Third period		No scoring
No scoring		Second overtime period		01:55 – Jamie Langenbrunner (2)
Ray Emery 30 saves / 33 shots		Goalie stats		Martin Brodeur 43 saves / 45 shots

April 30	New Jersey Devils	0–2	Ottawa Senators	Scotiabank Place	Recap
No scoring		First period	No scoring
No scoring		Second period	No scoring
No scoring		Third period	04:46 – Tom Preissing (2); 19:04 – en – Jason Spezza (4)
Martin Brodeur 32 saves / 33 shots		Goalie stats	Ray Emery 25 saves / 25 shots

May 2	New Jersey Devils	2–3	Ottawa Senators	Scotiabank Place	Recap
No scoring		First period	04:34 – Daniel Alfredsson (5)
Brian Gionta (8) – pp – 04:17		Second period	14:44 – Dany Heatley (5)
Jay Pandolfo (1) – 09:36		Third period	03:58 – Mike Fisher (1)
Martin Brodeur 33 saves / 36 shots		Goalie stats	Ray Emery 29 saves / 31 shots

May 5	Ottawa Senators	3–2	New Jersey Devils	Continental Airlines Arena	Recap
No scoring		First period	06:59 – Scott Gomez (3)
Antoine Vermette (2) – 05:19; Jason Spezza (5) – pp – 12:06; Daniel Alfredsson (6) – 17:28		Second period	No scoring
No scoring		Third period	19:20 – Scott Gomez (4)
Ray Emery 27 saves / 29 shots		Goalie stats	Martin Brodeur 21 saves / 24 shots

Ottawa won series 4–1

=== Western Conference semifinals ===
==== (1) Detroit Red Wings vs. (5) San Jose Sharks ====
This was the third playoff meeting between these two teams with the teams splitting the two previous series. They last met in the 1995 Western Conference semifinals where Detroit won in four games. San Jose won three of the four games during this year's regular season series.

The Red Wings won three consecutive games to eliminate San Jose in six games. Sharks goaltender Evgeni Nabokov made 34 saves as San Jose shutout the Red Wings in game one by a score of 2–0. Pavel Datsyuk gave the Red Wings the lead with just 1:24 remaining in the third period, taking a 3–2 victory. San Jose forward Jonathan Cheechoo scored the game-winner on the power play in game three as the Sharks won the game 2–1. Detroit came back from a two-goal deficit in game four by scoring in the final minute of both the second and third periods and Mathieu Schneider scored the overtime winner on the power-play for the Red Wings in a 3–2 win. After allowing the opening goal in game five the Red Wings scored four unanswered goals winning the game 4–1. Two goals from Detroit winger Mikael Samuelsson and a shutout by Dominik Hasek in game six ended the series in a 2–0 Red Wings victory.

April 26	San Jose Sharks	2–0	Detroit Red Wings	Joe Louis Arena	Recap
Matt Carle (2) – pp – 09:45; Mike Grier (2) – 10:09		First period	No scoring
No scoring		Second period	No scoring
No scoring		Third period	No scoring
Evgeni Nabokov 34 saves / 34 shots		Goalie stats	Dominik Hasek 17 saves / 19 shots

April 28	San Jose Sharks	2–3	Detroit Red Wings	Joe Louis Arena	Recap
Jonathan Cheechoo (1) – 00:36; Joe Thornton (1) – 04:17		First period	17:30 – Henrik Zetterberg (3)
No scoring		Second period	No scoring
No scoring		Third period	01:23 – sh – Daniel Cleary (2); 18:36 – Pavel Datsyuk (4)
Evgeni Nabokov 19 saves / 22 shots		Goalie stats	Dominik Hasek 17 saves / 19 shots

April 30	Detroit Red Wings	1–2	San Jose Sharks	HP Pavilion	Recap
Nicklas Lidstrom (3) – pp – 11:13		First period	No scoring
No scoring		Second period	12:43 – Ryane Clowe (4)
No scoring		Third period	13:19 – pp – Jonathan Cheechoo (2)
Dominik Hasek 25 saves / 27 shots		Goalie stats	Evgeni Nabokov 29 saves / 30 shots

May 2	Detroit Red Wings	3–2	OT	San Jose Sharks	HP Pavilion	Recap
No scoring		First period		17:52 – Jonathan Cheechoo (3)
Tomas Holmstrom (1) – pp – 19:55		Second period		08:07 – Marcel Goc (1)
Robert Lang (2) – 19:26		Third period		No scoring
Mathieu Schneider (2) – pp – 16:04		First overtime period		No scoring
Dominik Hasek 25 saves / 27 shots		Goalie stats		Evgeni Nabokov 46 saves / 49 shots

May 5	San Jose Sharks	1–4	Detroit Red Wings	Joe Louis Arena	Recap
Marcel Goc (2) – 04:53		First period	No scoring
No scoring		Second period	03:10 – Henrik Zetterberg (4); 16:13 – Pavel Datsyuk (5)
No scoring		Third period	03:46 – pp – Mikael Samuelsson (1); 06:14 – pp – Tomas Holmstrom (2)
Evgeni Nabokov 29 saves / 33 shots		Goalie stats	Dominik Hasek 23 saves / 24 shots

May 7	Detroit Red Wings	2–0	San Jose Sharks	HP Pavilion	Recap
Mikael Samuelsson (2) – 15:26; Mikael Samuelsson (3) – 19:52		First period	No scoring
No scoring		Second period	No scoring
No scoring		Third period	No scoring
Dominik Hasek 28 saves / 28 shots		Goalie stats	Evgeni Nabokov 20 saves / 22 shots

Detroit won series 4–2

==== (2) Anaheim Ducks vs. (3) Vancouver Canucks ====
This was the first and to date only playoff meeting between these two teams. Anaheim won three of the four games during this year's regular season series.

The Ducks eliminated Vancouver in five games. After allowing the opening goal in game one Anaheim responded with five unanswered goals and won by a final score of 5–1, Ducks forward Andy McDonald recorded a hat trick in the contest. The teams traded a goal apiece during regulation time and Jeff Cowan ended the game 7:49 into double overtime as Vancouver tied the series with a 2–1 victory. Anaheim's special teams made the difference in game three as the Ducks successfully killed off seven penalties and scored twice on the power-play as Anaheim won the game 3–2. The Ducks came back from a two-goal deficit in the third period of game four to force overtime and won the game 3–2 on a goal scored by Travis Moen at 2:07 of the first overtime period. After Vancouver forced overtime in game five, goaltender Roberto Luongo missed the first three minutes of the first overtime period to what was first believed to be an equipment malfunction. However, after the series ended, it was revealed that Luongo, instead, had an untimely case of diarrhea. Backup Dany Sabourin stopped five Anaheim shots before Luongo returned to action 3:34 into the period. Shortly into the second overtime period Scott Niedermayer fired a wrist shot that found the back of the net after Luongo took his eye off the puck to look at the referee, believing a penalty should have been issued. The Ducks won the game 2–1 and clinched the series and moved them on to the Western Conference Final.

April 25	Vancouver Canucks	1–5	Anaheim Ducks	Honda Center	Recap
Jeff Cowan (1) – 07:07		First period	09:24 – pp – Andy McDonald (2); 14:56 – Teemu Selanne (2); 19:11 – Andy McDonald (3)
No scoring		Second period	No scoring
No scoring		Third period	09:05 – Ryan Getzlaf (3); 19:08 – pp – Andy McDonald (4)
Roberto Luongo 27 saves / 31 shots Dany Sabourin 5 saves / 6 shots		Goalie stats	Jean-Sebastien Giguere 26 saves / 27 shots

April 27	Vancouver Canucks	2–1	2OT	Anaheim Ducks	Honda Center	Recap
No scoring		First period		No scoring
Markus Naslund (2) – 06:30		Second period		11:01 – Travis Moen (2)
No scoring		Third period		No scoring
Jeff Cowan (2) – 07:49		Second overtime period		No scoring
Roberto Luongo 43 saves / 44 shots		Goalie stats		Jean-Sebastien Giguere 47 saves / 49 shots

April 29	Anaheim Ducks	3–2	Vancouver Canucks	General Motors Place	Recap
Dustin Penner (2) – 03:08		First period	19:12 – pp – Markus Naslund (3)
Francois Beauchemin (3) – pp – 09:45		Second period	14:31 – Daniel Sedin (2)
Corey Perry (2) – pp – 07:51		Third period	No scoring
Jean-Sebastien Giguere 24 saves / 26 shots		Goalie stats	Roberto Luongo 21 saves / 24 shots

May 1	Anaheim Ducks	3–2	OT	Vancouver Canucks	General Motors Place	Recap
No scoring		First period		12:55 – Markus Naslund (4)
No scoring		Second period		17:31 – Brendan Morrison (1)
Chris Pronger (3) – 03:58; Teemu Selanne (3) – 14:18		Third period		No scoring
Travis Moen (3) – 02:07		First overtime period		No scoring
Jean-Sebastien Giguere 24 saves / 26 shots		Goalie stats		Roberto Luongo 27 saves / 30 shots

May 3	Vancouver Canucks	1–2	2OT	Anaheim Ducks	Honda Center	Recap
No scoring		First period		No scoring
No scoring		Second period		00:14 – Samuel Pahlsson (1)
Alex Burrows (1) – 11:03		Third period		No scoring
No scoring		Second overtime period		04:30 – Scott Niedermayer (1)
Roberto Luongo 56 saves / 58 shots Dany Sabourin 5 saves / 5 shots		Goalie stats		Jean-Sebastien Giguere 26 saves / 27 shots

Anaheim won series 4–1

== Conference finals ==
=== Eastern Conference final ===
==== (1) Buffalo Sabres vs. (4) Ottawa Senators ====
This was the fourth and most recent playoff meeting between these two teams, with Buffalo winning all three previous series. They last met in the previous year's Eastern Conference semifinals where Buffalo won in five games. This was Buffalo's second consecutive Conference finals appearance, and their fifth overall in the semifinals/conference finals since the league began using a 16-team or greater playoff format in 1980; they lost to Carolina in seven games in the previous year. Ottawa most recently made it to the conference finals in 2003 where they lost to New Jersey in seven games. Ottawa won five of the eight games during this year's regular season series.

The Senators advanced to their first Stanley Cup Final by eliminating the Sabres in five games. The Senators took control of game one in the third period and scored three goals to win 5–2. Buffalo forward Daniel Briere scored with only six seconds left in game two to force overtime. Joe Corvo scored the game-winning goal for Ottawa at 4:58 of double overtime in a 4–3 victory. Ray Emery made 15 saves and Daniel Alfredsson scored the only goal in game three as Ottawa shut out the Sabres 1–0. The Sabres took a three-goal lead just before the halfway point of game four and hung on to force a fifth game with a 3–2 win. Overtime was needed in game five as the teams traded goals through regulation time, Ottawa captain Daniel Alfredsson ended the series with his goal at 9:32 of the first overtime as the Senators won by a final score of 3–2.

May 10	Ottawa Senators	5–2	Buffalo Sabres	HSBC Arena	Recap
Mike Fisher (2) – sh – 04:32; Daniel Alfredsson (7) – pp – 07:54		First period	10:55 – Maxim Afinogenov (3)
No scoring		Second period	08:45 – Toni Lydman (2)
Oleg Saprykin (1) – 07:41; Jason Spezza (6) – pp – 15:48; Dean McAmmond (3) – en – 19:47		Third period	No scoring
Ray Emery 18 saves / 20 shots		Goalie stats	Ryan Miller 29 saves / 33 shots

May 12	Ottawa Senators	4–3	2OT	Buffalo Sabres	HSBC Arena	Recap
Daniel Alfredsson (8) – 14:22		First period		03:41 – Thomas Vanek (6); 06:13 – Jochen Hecht (3)
Mike Fisher (3) – pp – 06:08; Wade Redden (2) – pp – 19:44		Second period		No scoring
No scoring		Third period		19:54 – Daniel Briere (3)
Joe Corvo (2) – 04:58		Second overtime period		No scoring
Ray Emery 34 saves / 37 shots		Goalie stats		Ryan Miller 28 saves / 32 shots

May 14	Buffalo Sabres	0–1	Ottawa Senators	Scotiabank Place	Recap
No scoring		First period	No scoring
No scoring		Second period	13:40 – Daniel Alfredsson (9)
No scoring		Third period	No scoring
Ryan Miller 31 saves / 32 shots		Goalie stats	Ray Emery 15 saves / 15 shots

May 16	Buffalo Sabres	3–2	Ottawa Senators	Scotiabank Place	Recap
Derek Roy (2) – 00:09		First period	No scoring
Maxim Afinogenov (4) – pp – 04:32; Chris Drury (8) – 08:06		Second period	14:55 – Dean McAmmond (4); 16:41 – Peter Schaefer (1)
No scoring		Third period	No scoring
Ryan Miller 31 saves / 33 shots		Goalie stats	Ray Emery 19 saves / 22 shots

May 19	Ottawa Senators	3–2	OT	Buffalo Sabres	HSBC Arena	Recap
No scoring		First period		No scoring
Dany Heatley (6) – 15:41; Jason Spezza (7) – 19:21		Second period		04:30 – Jochen Hecht (4)
No scoring		Third period		10:58 – pp – Maxim Afinogenov (5)
Daniel Alfredsson (10) – 09:32		First overtime period		No scoring
Ray Emery 27 saves / 29 shots		Goalie stats		Ryan Miller 22 saves / 25 shots

Ottawa won series 4–1

=== Western Conference final ===
==== (1) Detroit Red Wings vs. (2) Anaheim Ducks ====
This was the fourth playoff meeting between these two teams, with Detroit winning two of the three previous series. They last met in the 2003 Western Conference quarterfinals where Anaheim won in four games. Detroit most recently made it to the conference finals in 2002 where they defeated Colorado in seven games, while Anaheim most recently made it to the conference finals in the previous year where they lost in five games to Edmonton. The teams split this year's four-game regular season series.

Anaheim defeated the Red Wings in six games. Detroit goaltender Dominik Hasek made 31 saves as the Red Wings took game one with a 2–1 victory. Scott Niedermayer ended game two at 14:17 of the first overtime as the Ducks tied the series with a 4–3 win. The Red Wings chased Ducks goaltender Jean-Sebastien Giguere from game three after he allowed three goals on thirteen shots, Detroit scored two more times and won the game 5–0. After the game Chris Pronger was suspended for one game by the NHL; his suspension was the result of a simultaneous hit on Tomas Holmstrom that Scott Niedermayer was penalized for. While Pronger received no penalty on the play for the hit during the game he was later suspended after NHL officials reviewed the replays, which showed Holmstrom being boarded from behind as a result of a Pronger elbow. The Ducks broke a tie in the third period of game four when Ryan Getzlaf scored on the power-play, they went on to add an empty net goal from Rob Niedermayer that gave Anaheim a 5–3 win that tied the series at two games. Scott Niedermayer forced overtime in game five as he scored on the power-play with 47.3 seconds remaining in the game; Teemu Selanne completed the comeback for Anaheim at 11:57 of the first overtime period as the Ducks took a 2–1 victory. The Red Wings mounted a late comeback attempt in game six before coming up short in a 4–3 loss that ended the series and sent Anaheim to the second Stanley Cup Final in their history.

May 11	Anaheim Ducks	1–2	Detroit Red Wings	Joe Louis Arena	Recap
No scoring		First period	03:44 – pp – Henrik Zetterberg (5)
No scoring		Second period	No scoring
Chris Kunitz (1) – 01:34		Third period	15:06 – Tomas Holmstrom (3)
Jean-Sebastien Giguere 17 saves / 19 shots		Goalie stats	Dominik Hasek 31 saves / 32 shots

May 13	Anaheim Ducks	4–3	OT	Detroit Red Wings	Joe Louis Arena	Recap
Rob Niedermayer (2) – 17:04		First period		No scoring
Andy McDonald (5) – 11:40		Second period		10:34 – sh – Kirk Maltby (1); 16:07 – pp – Nicklas Lidstrom (4)
Travis Moen (4) – 05:06		Third period		01:03 – pp – Pavel Datsyuk (6)
Scott Niedermayer (2) – 14:17		First overtime period		No scoring
Jean-Sebastien Giguere 24 saves / 27 shots		Goalie stats		Dominik Hasek 29 saves / 33 shots

May 15	Detroit Red Wings	5–0	Anaheim Ducks	Honda Center	Recap
Johan Franzen (3) – 11:09; Tomas Holmstrom (4) – pp – 19:17		First period	No scoring
Todd Bertuzzi (2) – 03:17; Tomas Holmstrom (5) – 03:34		Second period	No scoring
Valtteri Filppula (3) – 10:58		Third period	No scoring
Dominik Hasek 29 saves / 29 shots		Goalie stats	Jean-Sebastien Giguere 10 saves / 13 shots Ilya Bryzgalov 13 saves / 15 shots

May 17	Detroit Red Wings	3–5	Anaheim Ducks	Honda Center	Recap
Daniel Cleary (3) – 03:29		First period	01:37 – Corey Perry (3); 11:46 – pp – Ric Jackman (1); 18:31 – Teemu Selanne (4)
Todd Bertuzzi (3) – pp – 07:48; Daniel Cleary (4) – pp – 15:36		Second period	No scoring
No scoring		Third period	05:24 – pp – Ryan Getzlaf (4); 18:52 – en – Rob Niedermayer (3)
Dominik Hasek 18 saves / 22 shots		Goalie stats	Jean-Sebastien Giguere 36 saves / 39 shots

May 20	Anaheim Ducks	2–1	OT	Detroit Red Wings	Joe Louis Arena	Recap
No scoring		First period		No scoring
No scoring		Second period		06:13 – Andreas Lilja (1)
Scott Niedermayer (3) – pp – 19:12		Third period		No scoring
Teemu Selanne (5) – 11:57		First overtime period		No scoring
Jean-Sebastien Giguere 36 saves / 37 shots		Goalie stats		Dominik Hasek 24 saves / 26 shots

May 22	Detroit Red Wings	3–4	Anaheim Ducks	Honda Center	Recap
No scoring		First period	03:51 – sh – Rob Niedermayer (4)
No scoring		Second period	09:52 – Corey Perry (4); 18:33 – pp – Ryan Getzlaf (5)
Henrik Zetterberg (6) – 03:15; Pavel Datsyuk (7) – pp – 10:08; Pavel Datsyuk (8) – pp – 16:56		Third period	05:54 – Samuel Pahlsson (2)
Dominik Hasek 25 saves / 29 shots		Goalie stats	Jean-Sebastien Giguere 26 saves / 29 shots

Anaheim won series 4–2

== Stanley Cup Final ==
This was the first and to date only playoff meeting between these two teams. Anaheim most recently made it to the Finals in 2003 where they were defeated by New Jersey in seven games, while Ottawa made their first Finals appearance in their fifteenth season. This was the first Finals series to be played in Ottawa since the original Ottawa Senators won the Stanley Cup in 1927. For the first time since 1999, neither of the two Stanley Cup finalists had previously won the Stanley Cup. The teams did not play each other during this year's regular season.

Anaheim became the first team based in the Pacific Time zone in the NHL's modern era to win the Stanley Cup; they also became the first west coast team to win the Stanley Cup since the Victoria Cougars in 1925, as well as the first team from California to win the Cup. The Senators became first NHL team from Ontario to reach the Finals since the Toronto Maple Leafs in 1967.

May 28	Ottawa Senators	2–3	Anaheim Ducks	Honda Center	Recap
Mike Fisher (4) – pp – 01:38		First period	10:55 – Andy McDonald (6)
Wade Redden (3) – pp – 04:36		Second period	No scoring
No scoring		Third period	05:44 – Ryan Getzlaf (6); 17:09 – Travis Moen (5)
Ray Emery 29 saves / 32 shots		Goalie stats	Jean-Sebastien Giguere 18 saves / 20 shots

May 30	Ottawa Senators	0–1	Anaheim Ducks	Honda Center	Recap
No scoring		First period	No scoring
No scoring		Second period	No scoring
No scoring		Third period	14:16 – Samuel Pahlsson (3)
Ray Emery 30 saves / 31 shots		Goalie stats	Jean-Sebastien Giguere 16 saves / 16 shots

June 2	Anaheim Ducks	3–5	Ottawa Senators	Scotiabank Place	Recap
Andy McDonald (7) – pp – 05:39		First period	16:10 – Chris Neil (2)
Corey Perry (5) – 05:20; Ryan Getzlaf (7) – 07:38		Second period	05:47 – Mike Fisher (5); 16:14 – pp – Daniel Alfredsson (11); 18:34 – Dean McAmmond (5)
No scoring		Third period	08:22 – Anton Volchenkov (2)
Jean-Sebastien Giguere 24 saves / 29 shots		Goalie stats	Ray Emery 19 saves / 22 shots

June 4	Anaheim Ducks	3–2	Ottawa Senators	Scotiabank Place	Recap
No scoring		First period	19:59 – pp – Daniel Alfredsson (12)
Andy McDonald (8) – 10:06; Andy McDonald (9) – 11:06		Second period	18:00 – Dany Heatley (7)
Dustin Penner (3) – 04:07		Third period	No scoring
Jean-Sebastien Giguere 21 saves / 23 shots		Goalie stats	Ray Emery 18 saves / 21 shots

June 6	Ottawa Senators	2–6	Anaheim Ducks	Honda Center	Recap
No scoring		First period	03:41 – pp – Andy McDonald (10); 17:41 – Rob Niedermayer (5)
Daniel Alfredsson (13) – 11:27; Daniel Alfredsson (14) – sh – 17:38		Second period	15:44 – Travis Moen (6); 18:28 – pp – Francois Beauchemin (4)
No scoring		Third period	04:01 – Travis Moen (7); 17:00 – Corey Perry (6)
Ray Emery 12 saves / 18 shots		Goalie stats	Jean-Sebastien Giguere 11 saves / 13 shots

Anaheim won series 4–1

== Player statistics ==
=== Skaters ===
GP = Games played; G = Goals; A = Assists; Pts = Points; +/– = Plus/minus; PIM = Penalty minutes

Player	Team	GP	G	A	Pts	+/–	PIM
Daniel Alfredsson	Ottawa Senators	20	14	8	22	+4	10
Jason Spezza	Ottawa Senators	20	7	15	22	+5	10
Dany Heatley	Ottawa Senators	20	7	15	22	+4	14
Nicklas Lidstrom	Detroit Red Wings	18	4	14	18	0	6
Ryan Getzlaf	Anaheim Ducks	21	7	10	17	+1	32
Pavel Datsyuk	Detroit Red Wings	18	8	8	16	+2	8
Corey Perry	Anaheim Ducks	21	6	9	15	+5	37
Teemu Selanne	Anaheim Ducks	21	5	10	15	+1	10
Chris Pronger	Anaheim Ducks	19	3	12	15	+10	26
Daniel Briere	Buffalo Sabres	16	3	12	15	+3	16

=== Goaltending ===
These are the top five goaltenders based on either goals against average or save percentage with at least four games played.

GP = Games played; W = Wins; L = Losses; SA = Shots against; GA = Goals against; GAA = Goals against average; TOI = Time On Ice (minutes:seconds); Sv% = Save percentage; SO = Shutouts

Player	Team	GP	W	L	SA	GA	GAA	TOI	Sv%	SO
Marty Turco	Dallas Stars	7	3	4	229	11	1.30	509:13	.952	3
Roberto Luongo	Vancouver Canucks	12	5	7	427	25	1.77	847:26	.941	0
Miikka Kiprusoff	Calgary Flames	6	2	4	255	18	2.81	383:35	.929	0
Henrik Lundqvist	New York Rangers	10	6	4	291	22	2.07	637:25	.924	1
Niklas Backstrom	Minnesota Wild	5	1	4	145	11	2.22	296:39	.924	0
Dominik Hasek	Detroit Red Wings	18	10	8	444	34	1.79	1,139:49	.923	2
Jean-Sebastien Giguere	Anaheim Ducks	18	13	4	451	35	1.97	1,067:04	.922	1

== Events and milestones ==
Detroit Red Wings defenceman Chris Chelios made his 22nd post-season appearance, breaking the record for most post-season appearances. The New York Rangers set a new post-season franchise record that year by defeating the Atlanta Thrashers 7–0 on April 17.

== See also ==
- 2006–07 NHL season
- List of NHL seasons
- 2007 in ice hockey

Preceded by 2006 Stanley Cup playoffs	Stanley Cup playoffs 2007	Succeeded by 2008 Stanley Cup playoffs
