= Dustin Penner =

Canadian ice hockey player (born 1982)

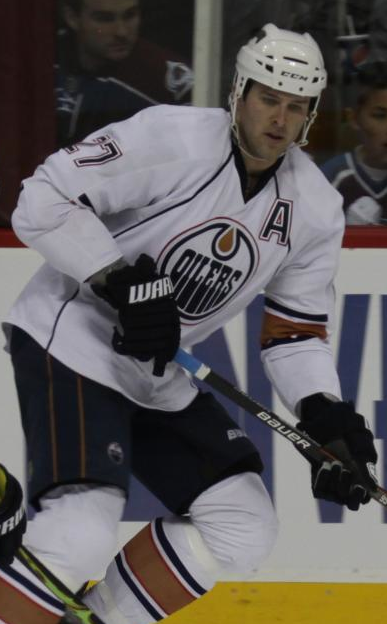
- Penner with the Edmonton Oilers in 2010
- Born: September 28, 1982 (age 43) Winkler, Manitoba, Canada
- Height: 6 ft 4 in (193 cm)
- Weight: 247 lb (112 kg; 17 st 9 lb)
- Position: Left wing
- Shot: Left
- Played for: Anaheim Ducks; Edmonton Oilers; Los Angeles Kings; Washington Capitals
- NHL draft: Undrafted
- Playing career: 2005–2014

Dustin Penner (born September 28, 1982) is a Canadian former professional ice hockey forward who played in the National Hockey League (NHL) for the Anaheim Ducks, Edmonton Oilers, Los Angeles Kings and Washington Capitals. Undrafted by any NHL team, in 2004, Penner signed with Anaheim after playing college hockey at the University of Maine in the National Collegiate Athletic Association (NCAA). Penner won the Stanley Cup in his first full season with Anaheim in 2007, before adding a second Stanley Cup in his first full season with Los Angeles in 2012.

== Playing career ==
=== Minors and collegiate ===
Growing up in Winkler, Manitoba, Penner played for his high school hockey team, the Garden Valley Collegiate Zodiacs, alongside future Washington Capitals teammate Eric Fehr. After high school, he was cut by many minor hockey teams, including his local junior club three times.

With little hope of ever playing hockey professionally, Penner agreed to play with Minot State University-Bottineau, now known as Dakota College at Bottineau, but immediately broke his femur, ending his first year with the club. The next year, in the 2001–02 season, he became a very important player for Bottineau, scoring 20 goals with 13 assists in 23 games, also earning the Most Determined Player Award for his improvement and stellar play after recovering from his injury.

Penner then went to an evaluation camp at Saskatoon. He played well there, scoring an average of three points per game. He was scouted by Grant Standbrook, the assistant coach for the University of Maine's Black Bears ice hockey team, and was offered a scholarship, which he accepted. Although he did not initially join the team, in the 2003–04 season, he helped lead the Black Bears and to the NCAA Championship game, scoring the game-winning goal in the semi-finals against Boston College. Maine then lost the championship title game to the University of Denver 1–0.

=== Anaheim Ducks ===
Having been undrafted by any NHL team, on May 12, 2004, Penner signed a three-year, entry-level contract with the Mighty Ducks of Anaheim. He was assigned to the Cincinnati Mighty Ducks, Anaheim's American Hockey League (AHL) affiliate. He recorded 28 points in his professional rookie season with Cincinnati, then took a major step the next season as he was moved to the Portland Pirates, which became the Mighty Ducks' AHL affiliate in 2005–06. He scored 39 goals and 84 points in 57 games with Portland while also making his NHL debut, appearing in 19 games with the Mighty Ducks that season. He was originally called up on November 23, 2005, being sent back and forth from the minors. During the Mighty Ducks' 2006 Stanley Cup playoff run, Penner scored 9 points in 13 games until Anaheim was eliminated by the Edmonton Oilers in the Western Conference Final.

Penner earned a full-time roster spot with the Ducks in 2006–07 and broke out with 29 goals and 45 points playing with Ryan Getzlaf and Corey Perry on a unit dubbed the "Kid Line". Penner's goal total was the second-highest on the team, only trailing superstar Teemu Selänne. He also set the Ducks' franchise rookie record for most points (surpassed by Bobby Ryan in 2008–09). During the Ducks' 2007 Stanley Cup run, Penner scored the game-winner in game one of the Western Conference Quarter-finals against the Minnesota Wild and game four of the Stanley Cup Final against the Ottawa Senators. In game five, Penner and the Ducks defeated the Senators 6–2 to win the 2007 Stanley Cup. Penner became the first former Maine Black Bear to win the Stanley Cup as a player.

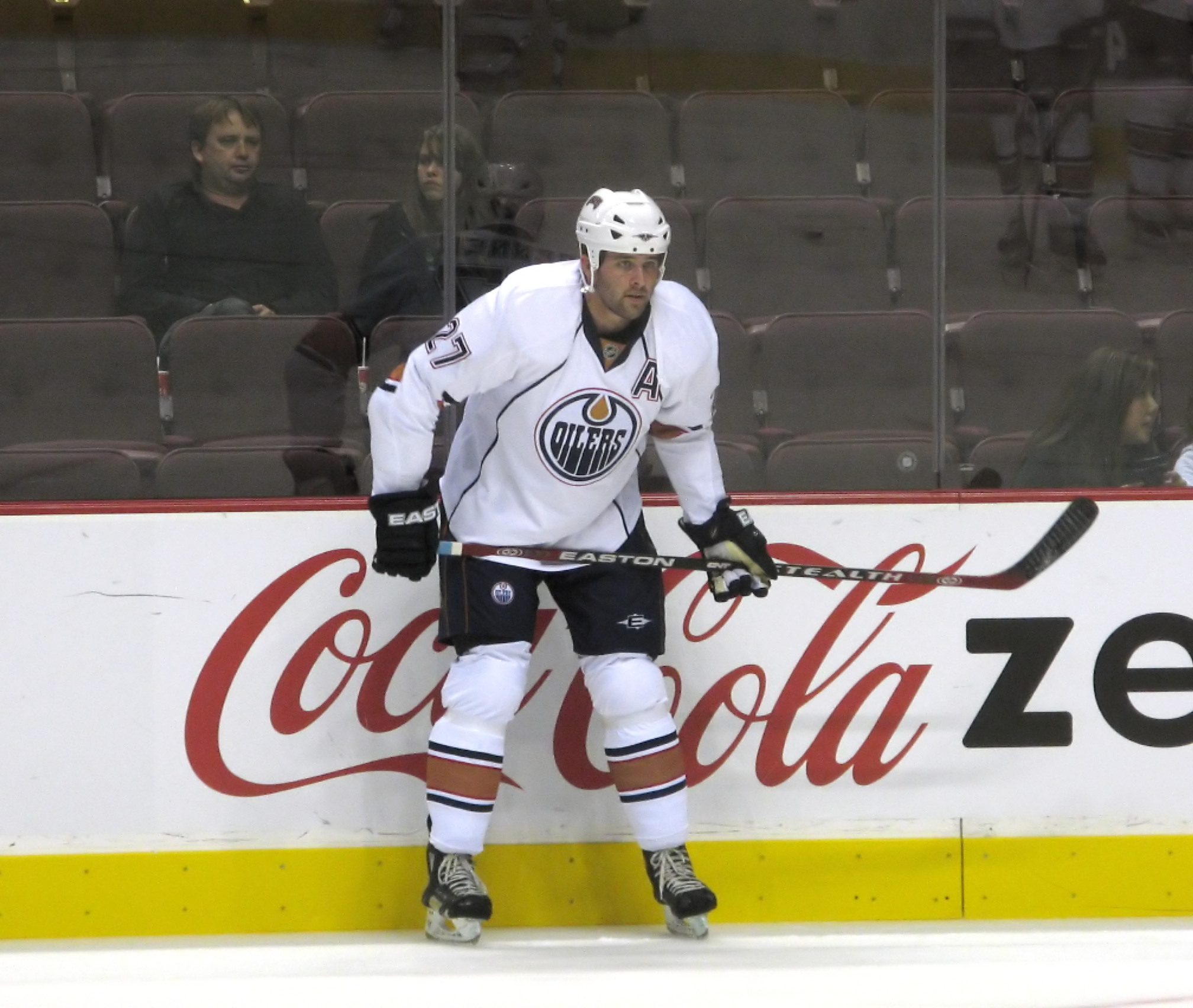
Penner in 2007.

=== Edmonton Oilers ===
After winning the Stanley Cup with the Ducks, Penner's entry-level contract expired and he became a restricted free agent in the off-season. With the Ducks dealing with salary cap issues and the signing of Todd Bertuzzi, Edmonton Oilers general manager Kevin Lowe jumped at the opportunity and signed Penner to a five-year, $21.25 million offer sheet. Lowe was criticized by the media and Ducks general manager Brian Burke. After seven days had passed, the Ducks were ultimately unwilling to match the offer and Penner became an Oiler. Penner remained the most recent player to change teams via an offer sheet for 14 years, until Montreal Canadiens accepted an offer sheet from Carolina Hurricanes for Jesperi Kotkaniemi.

In his first season with the Oilers, Penner scored a team-high 23 goals and improved to 47 points. He then began the 2008–09 season with a slow start and was publicly criticized by head coach Craig MacTavish for a lack of fitness and competitiveness after being made a healthy scratch for the second consecutive game.

Penner was confirmed to be a part of a planned summertime 2009 blockbuster trade that would see Andrew Cogliano, Ladislav Šmíd and himself dealt to the Ottawa Senators in exchange for disgruntled All-Star forward Dany Heatley. Ultimately, Heatley exercised the no-trade clause contained in his contract and the trade could not be finalized (shortly after, Heatley accepted a trade to the San Jose Sharks).

Penner got off to a strong start in 2009–10 season and was fourth in NHL scoring with 11 goals and 11 assists after 18 games played. On October 22, for the first time in his career, he scored five points (two goals and three assists), in a game against the Columbus Blue Jackets. His linemates for that game were Aleš Hemský (one goal and four assists) and Sam Gagner (one goal and two assists). At season's end, the Oilers had finished last overall in the NHL, but Penner had recorded career-highs in goals (32) and points (63).

=== Los Angeles Kings ===
On February 28, 2011, Penner was traded to the Los Angeles Kings in exchange for Colten Teubert, a first-round draft pick in 2011 (Oscar Klefbom) and a conditional third-round pick in the 2012 (Daniil Zharkov).

On January 7, 2012, Penner experienced back spasms while attempting to eat what he described as "delicious pancakes". The injury caused him to miss a game and become the subject of pancake-related jokes among fans.

On May 22, 2012, Penner scored the winning goal in overtime in game five against the Phoenix Coyotes to advance the Kings to the 2012 Stanley Cup Final. On June 11, 2012, Penner won his second Stanley Cup after the Kings defeated the New Jersey Devils 6–1 in game six.

Penner is the 21st NHL player to play for both sides of the "Freeway Face-Off" between the Anaheim Ducks and the Los Angeles Kings, and the only one to win the Stanley Cup with both teams.

On July 1, 2012, Penner signed a one-year, $3.25 million contract extension with Los Angeles.

=== Return to Anaheim ===
On July 16, 2013, as a free agent, Penner returned to the Anaheim Ducks after signing a one-year, $2 million contract with the team. During the 2013–14 season, he rebounded offensively with the Ducks, reuniting with former line-mates Ryan Getzlaf and Corey Perry.

=== Trade to Washington ===
On March 4, 2014, approaching the NHL trade deadline date and having scored a respectable 13 goals and 32 points with Anaheim in 49 games, Penner was traded to the Washington Capitals in exchange for a fourth-round draft pick.

== Career statistics ==
=== Regular season and playoffs ===
			Regular season					Playoffs
Season	Team	League	GP	G	A	Pts	PIM	GP	G	A	Pts	PIM
1997–98	Garden Valley Collegiate	HS-MB	—	0	1	1	0	—	—	—	—	—
1998–99	Garden Valley Collegiate	HS-MB	—	—	—	—	—	—	—	—	—	—
1999–00	Garden Valley Collegiate	HS-MB	—	34	19	53	—	—	—	—	—	—
2000–01	MSU-Bottineau	NJCAA	—	—	—	—	—	—	—	—	—	—
2001–02	MSU-Bottineau	NJCAA	23	20	12	32	52	—	—	—	—	—
2003–04	Maine Black Bears	HE	43	11	12	23	52	—	—	—	—	—
2004–05	Cincinnati Mighty Ducks	AHL	77	10	18	28	82	9	2	3	5	13
2005–06	Portland Pirates	AHL	57	39	45	84	68	5	4	3	7	0
2005–06	Mighty Ducks of Anaheim	NHL	19	4	3	7	14	13	3	6	9	12
2006–07	Anaheim Ducks	NHL	82	29	16	45	58	21	3	5	8	2
2007–08	Edmonton Oilers	NHL	82	23	24	47	45	—	—	—	—	—
2008–09	Edmonton Oilers	NHL	78	17	20	37	61	—	—	—	—	—
2009–10	Edmonton Oilers	NHL	82	32	31	63	38	—	—	—	—	—
2010–11	Edmonton Oilers	NHL	62	21	18	39	45	—	—	—	—	—
2010–11	Los Angeles Kings	NHL	19	2	4	6	2	6	1	1	2	4
2011–12	Los Angeles Kings	NHL	65	7	10	17	43	20	3	8	11	32
2012–13	Los Angeles Kings	NHL	33	2	12	14	18	18	3	2	5	8
2013–14	Anaheim Ducks	NHL	49	13	19	32	28	—	—	—	—	—
2013–14	Washington Capitals	NHL	18	1	2	3	2	—	—	—	—	—
NHL totals			589	151	159	310	354	78	13	22	35	58

== Awards and honors ==
Award	Year
College
All-NCAA All-Tournament Team	2004
Jack Semler Award	2004
NHL
Stanley Cup champion	2007, 2012
