= Johan Holmqvist =

Swedish ice hockey player

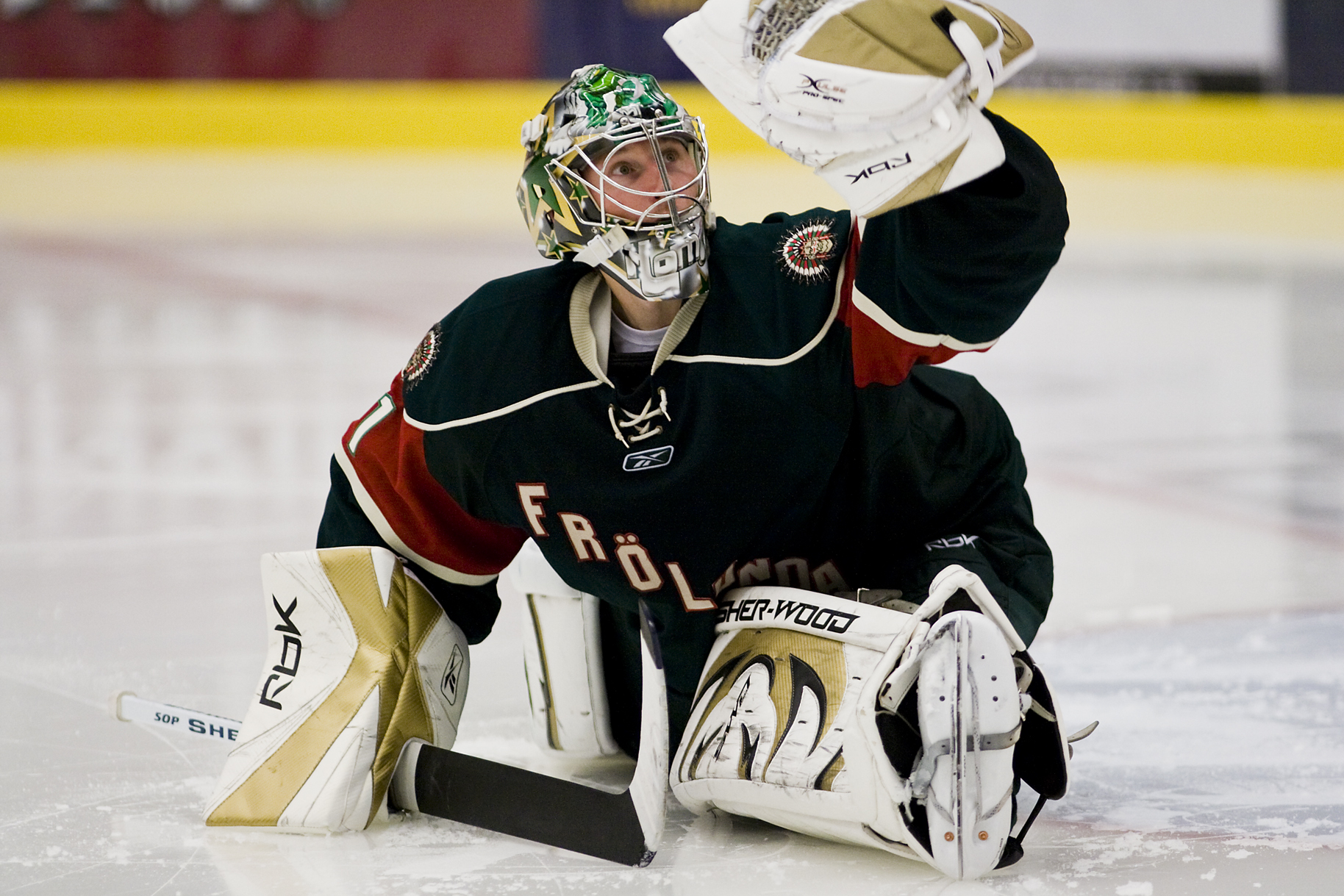
- Johan Holmqvist playing for Frölunda HC during a preseason game against Tappara in Borås Sweden in August 2008.
- Born: May 24, 1978 (age 48) Tolfta, Sweden
- Height: 6 ft 3 in (191 cm)
- Weight: 195 lb (88 kg; 13 st 13 lb)
- Position: Goaltender
- Caught: Left
- Played for: Brynäs IF; New York Rangers; Dallas Stars; Tampa Bay Lightning; Frölunda HC; Karlskrona HK
- National team: Sweden
- NHL draft: 175th overall, 1997; New York Rangers
- Playing career: 1996–2018

Johan Erik Daniel Holmqvist (born May 24, 1978) is a Swedish former professional ice hockey goaltender, he most notably played in the National Hockey League (NHL) and the Swedish Hockey League (SHL).

== Playing career ==
He started his career in the Elitserien team Brynäs IF. He played for their senior team from 1996 to 2000, winning a Swedish championship in 1999. He then signed with the New York Rangers, who had drafted Holmqvist in the 1997 NHL entry draft (7th round/175 pick overall). Holmqvist played four NHL games for the Rangers between 2000 and 2003. Most of his time was spent with the Rangers' farm team, the Hartford Wolf Pack of the AHL.

On March 11, 2003, Holmqvist was traded to the Minnesota Wild for Lawrence Nycholat. Holmqvist played the rest of the season with the Wild's farm team, the Houston Aeros of the AHL, and won the Jack A. Butterfield Trophy as MVP of the Calder Cup Playoffs as Houston won the league championship. The following season, 2003/04, he played with the Aeros. At the end of the season, he decided to move back to Sweden where he signed with his former club, Brynäs IF.

He played with them for two seasons and then, on June 1, 2006, he signed with the Tampa Bay Lightning, an NHL club. He played with them for almost two years, putting up mixed numbers. He was traded at the 2008 trade deadline to the Dallas Stars along with Brad Richards for Mike Smith, Jeff Halpern and Jussi Jokinen. On July 23, 2008, he signed a contract with the Swedish club Frölunda HC.

== International play ==
Medal record

Representing Sweden

Ice hockey

World Championships
| Gold medal – first place | 2006 Riga | |
| Bronze medal – third place | 2009 Bern/Kloten | |

Holmqvist has represented Sweden in two World Championships, 2005 and 2006. He was Sweden's starting goaltender in 2006 and led Sweden to their first gold medal in a World Championship since 1998, for which he was selected as the tournament's best goaltender.

== Career statistics ==
=== Regular season and playoffs ===
| | | | Regular season | | | | | | | | | | Playoffs |
| Season | Team | League | GP | W | L | T | OTL | MIN | GA | SO | GAA | SV% | GP | W | L | MIN | GA | SO | GAA | SV% |
|---|---|---|---|---|---|---|---|---|---|---|---|---|---|---|---|---|---|---|---|---|
| 1996–97 | Brynäs IF | SEL | 2 | — | — | — | — | 80 | 4 | 0 | 3.00 | .879 | — | — | — | — | — | — | — | — |
| 1997–98 | Brynäs IF | SEL | 33 | — | — | — | — | 1897 | 82 | 0 | 2.59 | .895 | 3 | 0 | 3 | 180 | 14 | 0 | 4.67 | .813 |
| 1998–99 | Brynäs IF | SEL | 41 | — | — | — | — | 2383 | 111 | 4 | 2.79 | .896 | 14 | 9 | 5 | 855 | 34 | 0 | 2.39 | .919 |
| 1999–00 | Brynäs IF | SEL | 41 | — | — | — | — | 2402 | 104 | 4 | 2.60 | .898 | 11 | — | — | 671 | 30 | 1 | 2.68 | .903 |
| 2000–01 | Hartford Wolf Pack | AHL | 43 | 19 | 4 | 4 | — | 2305 | 111 | 2 | 2.89 | .906 | 5 | 2 | 3 | 314 | 13 | 0 | 2.48 | .923 |
| 2000–01 | New York Rangers | NHL | 2 | 0 | 2 | 0 | — | 119 | 10 | 0 | 5.04 | .859 | — | — | — | — | — | — | — | — |
| 2001–02 | Hartford Wolf Pack | AHL | 48 | 26 | 12 | 6 | — | 2734 | 140 | 1 | 3.07 | .899 | 4 | 1 | 2 | 163 | 12 | 0 | 4.41 | .815 |
| 2001–02 | New York Rangers | NHL | 1 | 0 | 0 | 0 | — | 9 | 0 | 0 | 0.00 | 1.000 | — | — | — | — | — | — | — | — |
| 2002–03 | Hartford Wolf Pack | AHL | 35 | 14 | 13 | 5 | — | 1904 | 84 | 2 | 2.65 | .910 | — | — | — | — | — | — | — | — |
| 2002–03 | New York Rangers | NHL | 1 | 0 | 1 | 0 | — | 39 | 2 | 0 | 3.08 | .889 | — | — | — | — | — | — | — | — |
| 2002–03 | Charlotte Checkers | ECHL | 1 | 1 | 0 | 0 | — | 60 | 2 | 0 | 2.00 | .956 | — | — | — | — | — | — | — | — |
| 2002–03 | Houston Aeros | AHL | 8 | 5 | 3 | 0 | — | 479 | 23 | 1 | 2.88 | .900 | 23 | 15 | 8 | 1499 | 50 | 1 | 2.00 | .928 |
| 2003–04 | Houston Aeros | AHL | 59 | 23 | 27 | 7 | — | 3467 | 148 | 4 | 2.56 | .908 | — | — | — | — | — | — | — | — |
| 2004–05 | Brynäs IF | SEL | 42 | 12 | 26 | 4 | — | 2445 | 138 | 1 | 3.39 | .891 | — | — | — | — | — | — | — | — |
| 2005–06 | Brynäs IF | SEL | 26 | 14 | 9 | — | 3 | 1539 | 50 | 3 | 1.95 | .928 | 4 | 0 | 4 | 194 | 13 | 0 | 4.02 | .866 |
| 2006–07 | Tampa Bay Lightning | NHL | 48 | 27 | 15 | — | 3 | 2548 | 121 | 1 | 2.85 | .893 | 6 | 2 | 4 | 370 | 18 | 0 | 2.92 | .893 |
| 2007–08 | Tampa Bay Lightning | NHL | 45 | 20 | 16 | — | 6 | 2469 | 124 | 2 | 3.01 | .890 | — | — | — | — | — | — | — | — |
| 2007–08 | Dallas Stars | NHL | 2 | 1 | 0 | — | 0 | 80 | 5 | 0 | 3.75 | .857 | — | — | — | — | — | — | — | — |
| 2008–09 | Frölunda HC | SEL | 49 | 27 | 18 | — | 2 | 2799 | 101 | 2 | 2.17 | .917 | 11 | 6 | 5 | 623 | 25 | 1 | 2.41 | .905 |
| 2009–10 | Frölunda HC | SEL | 53 | 23 | 21 | — | 9 | 3181 | 142 | 0 | 2.68 | .896 | 7 | 3 | 4 | 429 | 22 | 0 | 3.08 | .893 |
| 2010–11 | Frölunda HC | SEL | 40 | 17 | 22 | — | 0 | 2297 | 105 | 3 | 2.74 | .903 | — | — | — | — | — | — | — | — |
| 2011–12 | Brynäs IF | SEL | 28 | 17 | 10 | — | 0 | 1599 | 63 | 1 | 2.36 | .916 | 4 | 2 | 2 | 252 | 9 | 0 | 2.15 | .931 |
| 2012–13 | Brynäs IF | SEL | 39 | 15 | 20 | — | 0 | 2095 | 88 | 4 | 2.52 | .914 | 4 | 0 | 4 | 216 | 15 | 0 | 4.17 | .895 |
| 2013–14 | Brynäs IF | SHL | 26 | 12 | 13 | — | 0 | 1542 | 71 | 2 | 2.76 | .901 | — | — | — | — | — | — | — | — |
| 2014–15 | Almtuna IS | SWE-2 | 22 | 11 | 9 | — | 0 | 1261 | 43 | 3 | 2.05 | .924 | — | — | — | — | — | — | — | — |
| 2014–15 | Brynäs IF | SHL | 5 | 1 | 4 | — | 0 | 276 | 11 | 1 | 2.39 | .911 | 1 | 0 | 1 | 64 | 3 | 0 | 2.83 | .912 |
| 2015–16 | Karlskrona HK | SHL | 20 | 5 | 14 | — | 0 | 1163 | 54 | 0 | 2.79 | .903 | — | — | — | — | — | — | — | — |
| 2016–17 | Karlskrona HK | SHL | 29 | 12 | 16 | — | 0 | 1695 | 67 | 2 | 2.37 | .919 | — | — | — | — | — | — | — | — |
| 2017–18 | Karlskrona HK | SHL | 5 | 1 | 3 | — | 0 | 293 | 16 | 0 | 3.28 | .904 | — | — | — | — | — | — | — | — |
| NHL totals | | | 99 | 48 | 34 | 0 | 9 | 5264 | 262 | 3 | 2.99 | .890 | 6 | 2 | 4 | 370 | 18 | 0 | 2.92 | .893 |

=== International ===
| Year | Team | Event | Result | GP | W | L | OT | MIN | GA | SO | GAA | SV% |
|---|---|---|---|---|---|---|---|---|---|---|---|---|
| 1996 | Sweden | EJC18 | 3rd place, bronze medalist(s) | 4 | 3 | 1 | 0 | 240 | 7 | 1 | 1.75 | .923 |
| 1998 | Sweden | WJC | 6th | 6 | — | — | — | 366 | 11 | 0 | 1.80 | .919 |
| 2005 | Sweden | WC | 4th | 1 | 0 | 1 | 0 | 40 | 3 | 0 | 4.50 | .857 |
| 2006 | Sweden | WC | 1st place, gold medalist(s) | 7 | 5 | 0 | 2 | 420 | 14 | 2 | 2.00 | .909 |
| 2009 | Sweden | WC | 3rd place, bronze medalist(s) | 2 | 1 | 0 | 0 | 88 | 4 | 0 | 2.73 | .915 |
| Junior totals | | | | 10 | — | — | — | 606 | 18 | 1 | 1.78 | — |
| Senior totals | | | | 10 | 6 | 1 | 2 | 548 | 21 | 2 | 2.30 | — |
