= Ryan Getzlaf =

Canadian ice hockey player (born 1985)

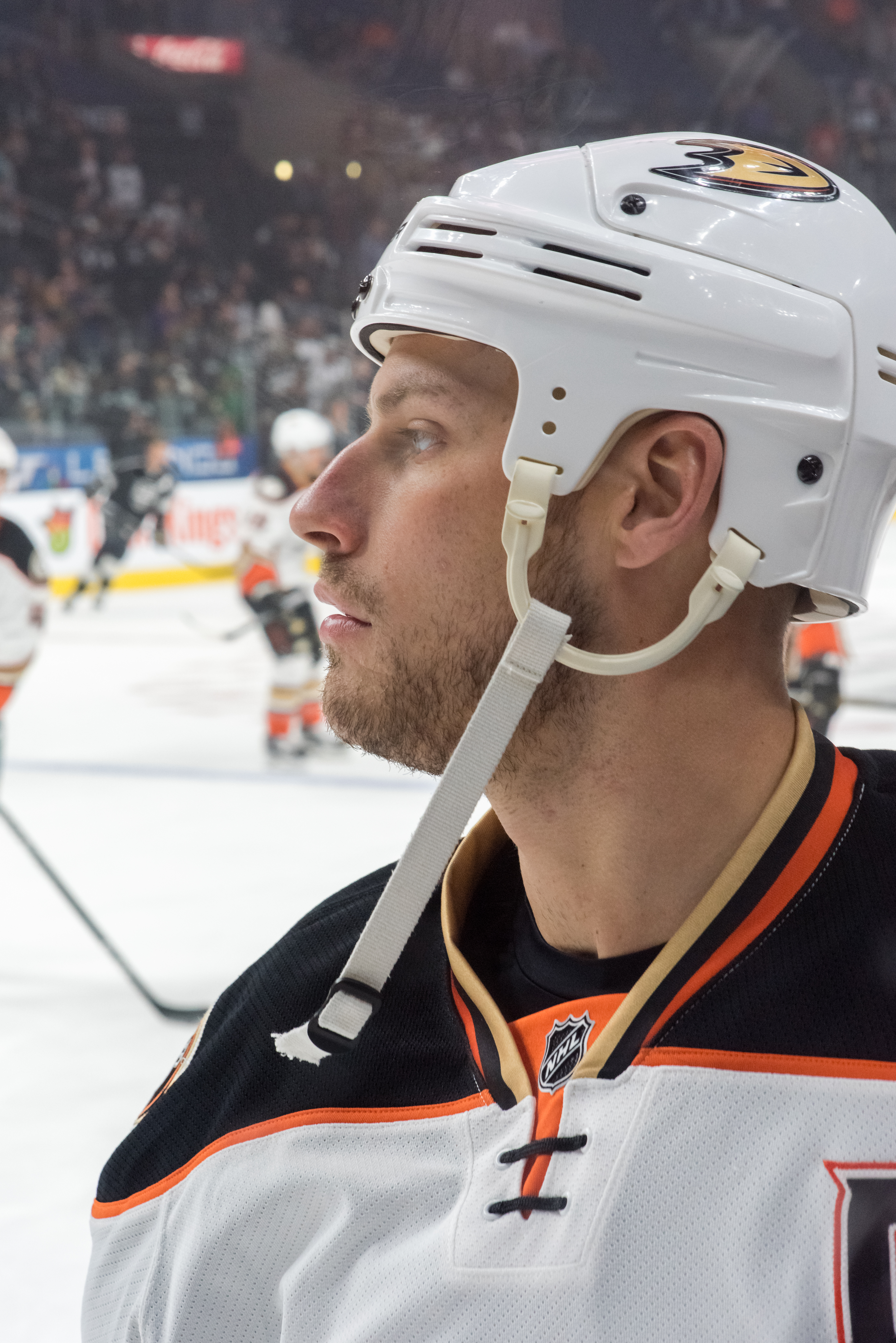
- Getzlaf with the Anaheim Ducks in April 2016
- Born: May 10, 1985 (age 41) Regina, Saskatchewan, Canada
- Height: 6 ft 4 in (193 cm)
- Weight: 220 lb (100 kg; 15 st 10 lb)
- Position: Centre
- Shot: Right
- Played for: Anaheim Ducks
- National team: Canada
- NHL draft: 19th overall, 2003; Mighty Ducks of Anaheim
- Playing career: 2005–2022

Ryan Getzlaf (born May 10, 1985) is a Canadian former professional ice hockey player. Getzlaf played his entire NHL career with the Anaheim Ducks and is the franchise's all-time leading scorer. A first-round selection, 19th overall, at the 2003 NHL entry draft, he played in three NHL All-Star Games and was a member of the Ducks' 2007 Stanley Cup championship team. A playmaker and power forward, Getzlaf is the Ducks' all-time leader in games played, assists, and points and the all-time playoff leader in goals, assists and points. He led the Ducks in assists twelve times, including a franchise record of 66 in 2008–09, and in points eight times. Getzlaf joined the NHL's Department of Player Safety in 2024.

As a junior, Getzlaf played four seasons with the Calgary Hitmen and was twice named to a Western Hockey League (WHL) all-star team. Internationally, he has represented Canada on numerous occasions. Getzlaf was a member of the 2005 World Junior Championship squad considered the greatest in Canadian history, and won a silver medal at the 2008 IIHF World Championship. A two-time Olympian, Getzlaf played with Canadian teams that won gold medals at the 2010 and 2014 Winter Games.

== Early life ==
Getzlaf was born May 10, 1985, in Regina, Saskatchewan. He is the younger son of Steve and Susan Getzlaf, and has an older brother, Chris. He attended Robert Usher Collegiate in Regina.

Growing up in an athletically minded family, both Ryan and Chris were encouraged to play several sports, particularly hockey and football. Chris focused on football and ultimately joined their hometown Saskatchewan Roughriders in the Canadian Football League as a slotback. Ryan played tailback in football, and represented Saskatchewan as a catcher in a national youth baseball tournament, but focused on his hockey career when he was 5.

== Playing career ==
=== Junior ===
While a member of the Regina Bantam AAA Rangers in 2000, Getzlaf was drafted into the Western Hockey League (WHL) by the Calgary Hitmen with the 54th pick in the 2000 WHL Bantam Draft. He stood 5 feet 9 inches (1.75 m) at the time of the draft, but grew 6 inches (0.15 m) by the time he joined the team as a 16-year-old. Getzlaf made his junior debut in 2001–02 and recorded 18 points in 63 games. He nearly quadrupled his offensive production as a 17-year-old in 2002–03 by scoring 29 goals and 68 points. His performance made him a top prospect for the 2003 National Hockey League (NHL) Entry Draft; the NHL Central Scouting Bureau ranked Getzlaf as the fifth best North American skater in the draft and he was taken in the first round, 19th overall, by the Mighty Ducks of Anaheim.

The Mighty Ducks returned Getzlaf to the Hitmen for the 2003–04 season. He recorded 75 points in just 49 games and was named to the WHL's first all-star team. Due to the 2004–05 NHL lock-out, Getzlaf was again returned to Calgary for his fourth season of junior hockey. He was named team captain, but was briefly stripped of the title by the coaches after earning several misconduct penalties for arguing with the officials. The captaincy was restored after a couple weeks, and Getzlaf moderated his interactions with referees. He also missed time during the season after suffering a concussion as a result of a hit by Dion Phaneuf of the Red Deer Rebels. Getzlaf finished the regular season with 54 points in 51 games, and after the Hitmen were eliminated from the WHL playoffs, was assigned to the Cincinnati Mighty Ducks of the American Hockey League (AHL) for their own playoff run. Getzlaf appeared in 10 post-season games for Cincinnati in his professional debut. He recorded one goal and four assists.

=== Anaheim Ducks (2005–2022) ===
==== Early years in Anaheim, Stanley Cup championship (2005–2010) ====
Getzlaf made the Mighty Ducks' roster out of training camp and began the 2005–06 season in Anaheim; he made his NHL debut on October 5, 2005, against the Chicago Blackhawks. After recording his first point with an assist on October 14 against the Columbus Blue Jackets, Getzlaf scored his first NHL goal seven days later against goaltender Manny Legace of the Detroit Red Wings. Though Getzlaf had seven points in his first 16 games with Anaheim, he was demoted to the AHL's Portland Pirates in mid-November, partially to gain more playing time than he was getting in Anaheim. He appeared in 17 games for the Pirates in which he scored 8 goals and added 25 assists. Along with teammate Corey Perry, Getzlaf shared AHL co-rookie of the month honours for December and while he was named to play in the 2006 AHL All-Star game, Getzlaf did not appear in the contest as he was recalled to Anaheim in mid-January. He completed the season in the NHL, and finished with 14 goals, 25 assists and 39 points in 57 regular season games, then added three goals, four assists for seven points in 16 post-season contests.

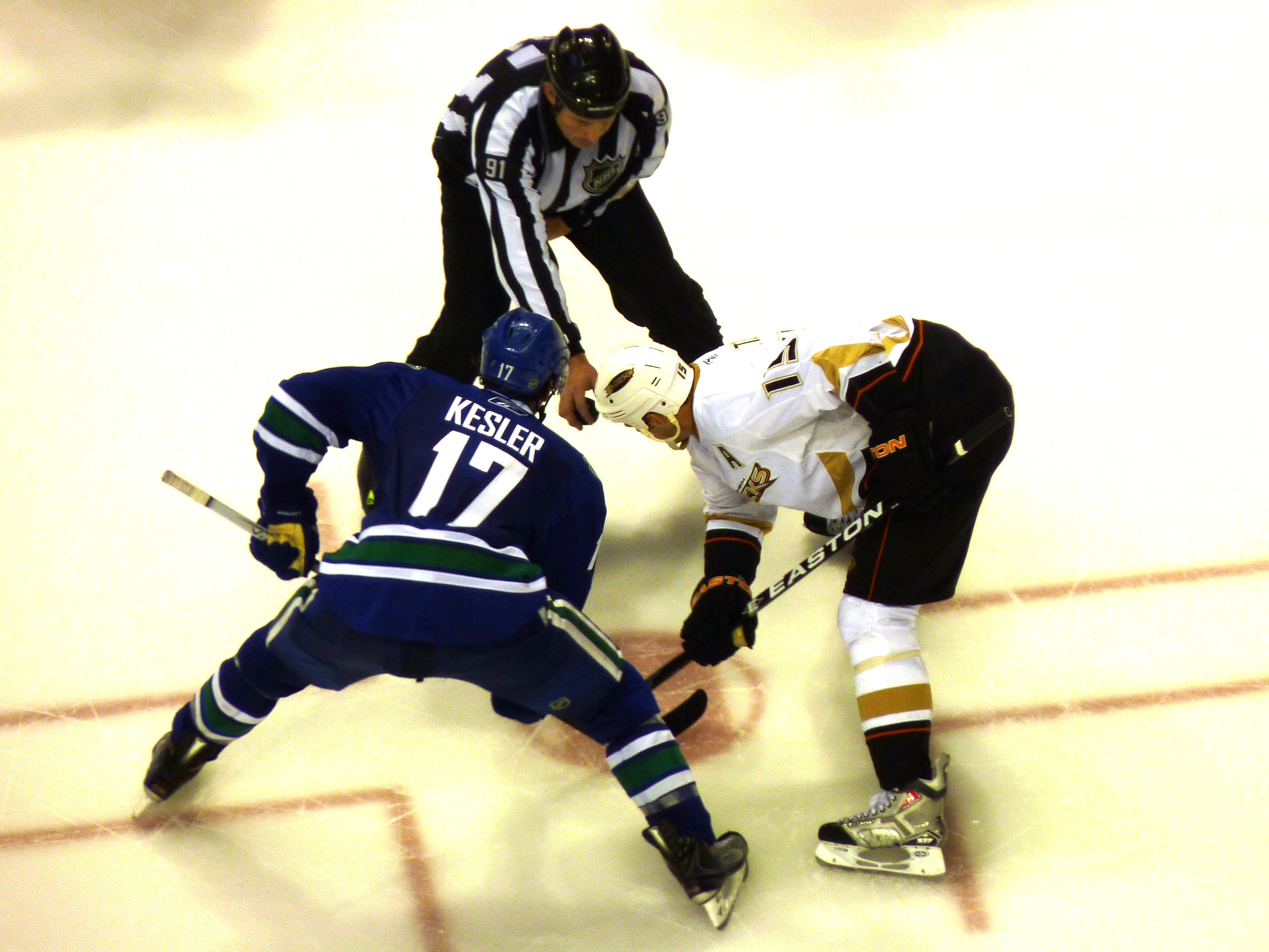
Getzlaf faces off with future teammate Ryan Kesler of the Vancouver Canucks in December 2009.

In his sophomore season with the newly renamed Anaheim Ducks, Getzlaf appeared in all 82 regular season games for the team and finished with 25 goals, 33 assists and 58 points. He played in the YoungStars Game at the 2007 NHL All-Star Game in Dallas. At the age of 22 years, Getzlaf joined with Corey Perry (21) and Dustin Penner (24) to form the Ducks' "kid line" which emerged as a top scoring unit during a 2007 playoff run to the 2007 Stanley Cup Final. Getzlaf led the Ducks in post-season scoring with 17 points, at the time a franchise playoff record, as the Ducks defeated the fourth-seeded Ottawa Senators in the final series in five games for the first Stanley Cup championship in franchise history.

The "kid line" was broken up prior to the 2007–08 season after Penner signed a contract as a restricted free agent with the Edmonton Oilers; however, Getzlaf opted to remain in Anaheim. He signed a five-year, $26.625 million extension that carried through the 2012–13 season. Getzlaf emerged as one of the NHL's top young stars as he played in his first All-Star Game in 2008, and led the Ducks in both assists (58) and points (82).

Getzlaf tied a Ducks franchise record early in the 2008–09 season as he recorded five assists in a 5–4 victory over the Detroit Red Wings on October 29, 2008. One of the League's leading scorers, Getzlaf again led the Ducks with a franchise-record 66 assists, and his 91 points was sixth-best in the NHL. He appeared in his second All-Star Game after being voted into the starting line-up for the 2009 contest by the fans. Though the Ducks upset the Presidents' Trophy-winning San Jose Sharks in the six games in the opening round of the 2009 playoffs, the Ducks were eliminated in the second round by the defending Stanley Cup champion and second-seeded Detroit Red Wings in seven games, Getzlaf set a franchise playoff record with 14 assists (in all 13 games), and four goals and finished sixth overall in post-season scoring (18).

An ankle sprain injury reduced Getzlaf to 66 games played in 2009–10. He still led the Ducks with 50 assists, and was second in team scoring with 69 points.

==== Western Conference Final runs, start of captaincy (2010–2017) ====
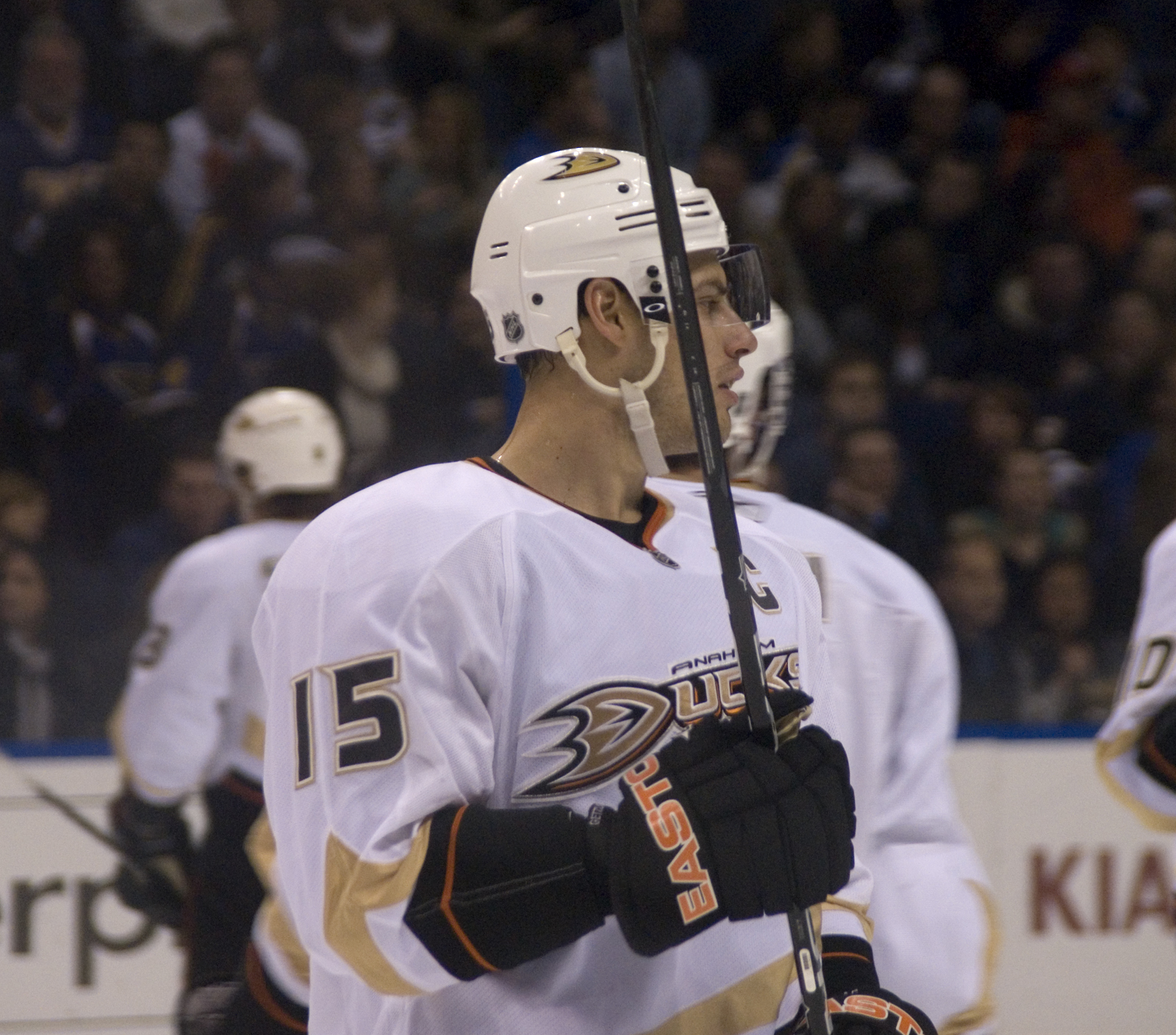
Getlaf awaiting a faceoff during a game in February 2011

Scott Niedermayer retired as a player following the season, and the Ducks named Getzlaf his successor as team captain prior to the 2010–11 season. Ducks' head coach Randy Carlyle described the promotion of the 25-year-old in terms of Getzlaf's maturation as an NHL player. He added "We felt that with it being his sixth season in the League, now is the time for the transition and the veteran players agreed with us." On December 28, 2010, he suffered multiple nasal sinus fractures in a game against the Phoenix Coyotes after being struck in the face by a puck, and consequently appeared in only 67 games; he recorded 19 goals, 57 assists for 76 points. Getzlaf's 57 assists ranked fourth in the NHL and he added six points in six post-season contests in a first round six game defeat at the hands of the fifth-seeded Nashville Predators including his 50th career playoff point.

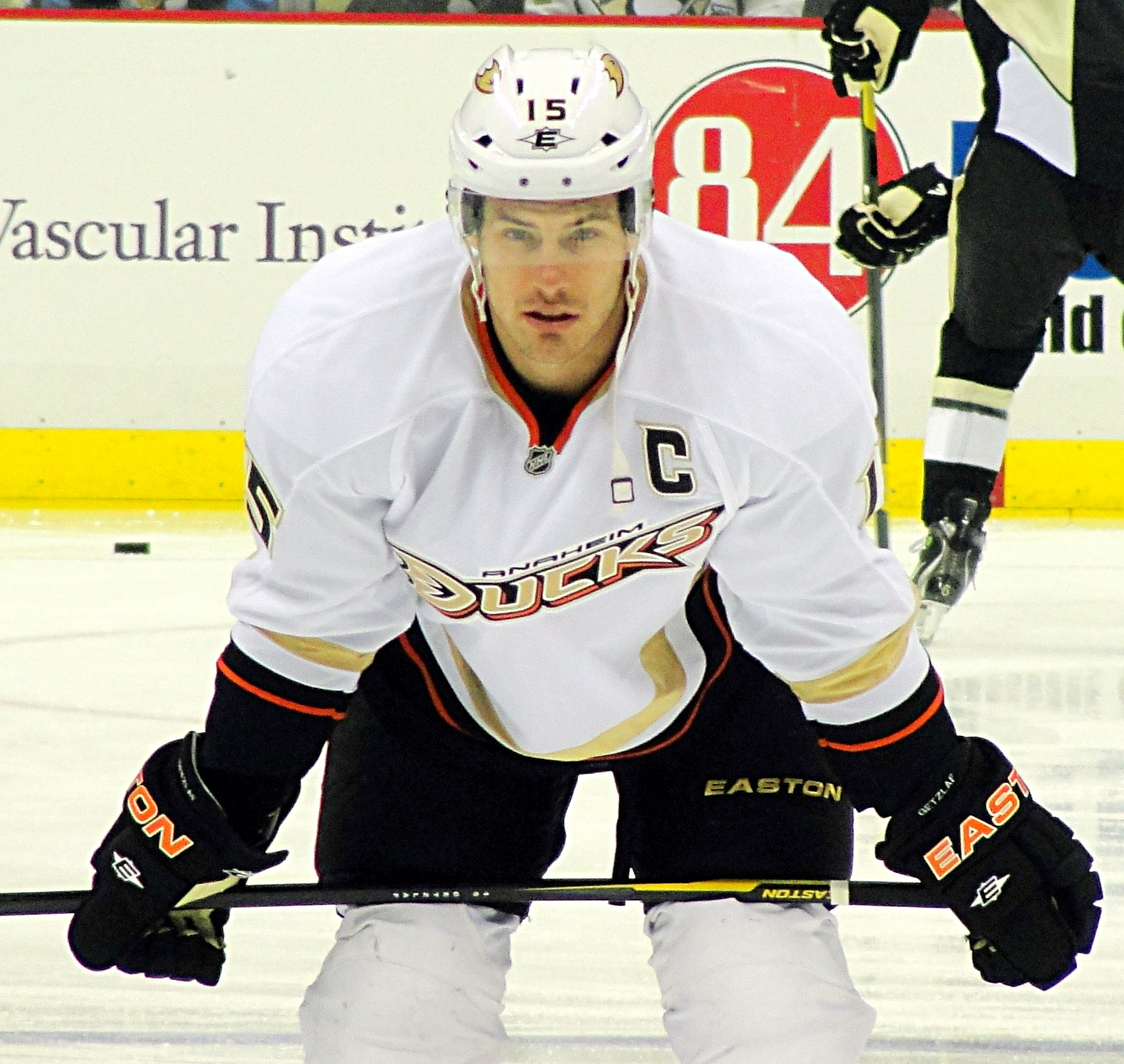
Getzlaf with the Ducks in February 2012

Getzlaf played his 500th career game on March 12, 2012, a 3–2 loss to the Colorado Avalanche. He played all 82 games for the Ducks in 2011–12 and led the team with 46 assists followed up by 11 goals and 57 points.

Another milestone came late in the 2012–13 season as Getzlaf recorded his 500th point on March 8, 2013, with an assist on a Bobby Ryan goal in a 4–0 win over the Calgary Flames. On the same day, the Ducks signed Getzlaf to an eight-year contract extension that runs through the 2021–22 season and is worth $66 million. He finished the lock-out-shortened campaign as the team leader in assists (34) and points (49), and tied for the team lead with 15 goals.

In 2013–14, Getzlaf recorded a career-high 31 goals and 56 assists to finish second to Pittsburgh Penguins forward and captain Sidney Crosby in league scoring with 87 points. Getzlaf was named to the second All-Star team and was a first-time finalist for the Hart Memorial Trophy as the NHL's most valuable player in the regular season. He finished as the runner-up to Crosby to the Ted Lindsay Award along with the Hart Trophy. In the final seconds of Anaheim's opening contest in the 2014 playoffs, against the Dallas Stars, Getzlaf suffered lacerations and bruises after blocking a shot with his face. He returned for the second game of the series, but missed the following two games due an undisclosed "upper body injury". Getzlaf returned for the remainder of his team's playoff series as they defeated the eighth-seeded Stars in six games before the Ducks were eliminated in the second round in seven games by the sixth-seeded and eventual Stanley Cup champion Los Angeles Kings, surrendering a 3–2 series lead in the process.

In the 2015 playoffs, Getzlaf tied the previous Ducks record for most assists in a post-season – which he himself set in 2009 – at 14 when he provided the primary assist on teammate Simon Després' game-winning goal in game three of the Western Conference Finals against the eventual Stanley Cup champion Chicago Blackhawks on May 22, 2015. The Ducks would eventually fall to the Blackhawks in seven games, one win short of reaching the Stanley Cup Finals and surrendering a 3–2 series lead in the process. Getzlaf was named a finalist for the Mark Messier Leadership Award alongside Chicago Blackhawks forward and captain Jonathan Toews and Winnipeg Jets forward and captain Andrew Ladd with the award eventually going to Toews.

In 2017, Getzlaf for the second time in his career was named a finalist for the Mark Messier Leadership Award along with Calgary Flames defencemen and captain Mark Giordano and Columbus Blue Jackets forward and captain Nick Foligno. In the second round of the 2017 playoffs against the Edmonton Oilers, Getzlaf surpassed former teammate Teemu Selänne's franchise record of 35 playoff goals against the Edmonton Oilers in game four of the best of seven series. During the Western Conference finals against the Nashville Predators, Getzlaf was fined $10,000 for using a homophobic slur to insult an on-ice official. He later said "That's my responsibility to understand that there are eyes and ears on us all the time. Fortunately enough, nobody heard it. If you can read lips, it's a little bit harder, and I apologize for that. That's a thing that you won't hear from me again. I hope I didn't offend anybody outside the circle that we trust."

==== Later career, team struggles (2017–2022) ====
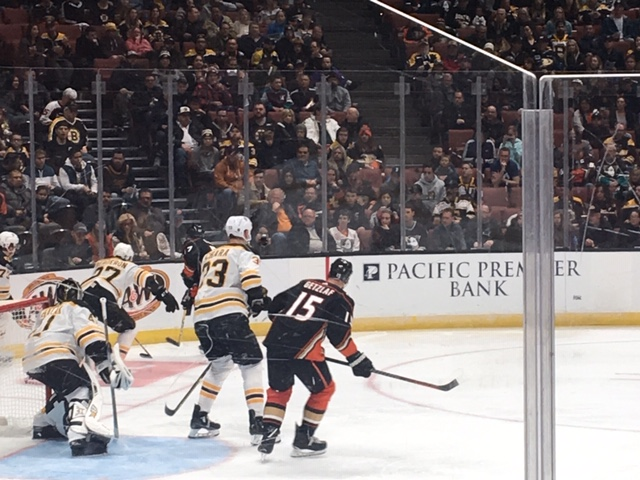
Getzlaf (right) battling with Zdeno Chara for position in front of the net in February 2019

Early in the 2017–18 season on October 29, 2017, Getzlaf was sidelined with a broken cheekbone after a hit in the face by a puck during a game against the Carolina Hurricanes that required surgery. He returned from his injury 19 games later, on December 11, to help the Ducks beat the Hurricanes 3–2. The Ducks qualified for the 2018 playoffs but were swept by the San Jose Sharks in the first round in four games. On April 23, 2018, Getzlaf was nominated for the King Clancy Memorial Trophy as a player who best exemplifies leadership qualities on and off the ice and gives back to his community; the award went to Daniel and Henrik Sedin of the Vancouver Canucks.

On November 3, 2019, Getzlaf played his 1,000th NHL game in a 3–2 loss to the Chicago Blackhawks.

During the pandemic shortened 2020-21 season on March 18, 2021, Getzlaf recorded his 700th NHL assist on a goal by Jamie Drysdale in a 3–2 OT win against the Arizona Coyotes.

On July 28, 2021, Getzlaf signed a one-year, $3 million contract to remain with the Ducks, with performance bonuses of up to $1.5 million. On October 31, Getzlaf scored his 989th career NHL point, passing Teemu Selänne as the Ducks' all-time leading scorer, in a 4–2 win over the Montreal Canadiens. On November 16, Getzlaf scored his 1,000th career NHL point, an assist on a goal by Cam Fowler, in a 3–2 overtime win over the Washington Capitals. On April 5, 2022, Getzlaf announced that he would retire at the end of the 2021–22 season and that his final game would be the last home game of the season for the Ducks on April 24, against the St. Louis Blues. Prior to the game, the Ducks honored Getzlaf with a pregame ceremony during which he was joined at center ice by his wife and four children along with the owners of the Ducks, Henry and Susan Samueli. The Ducks presented Getzlaf with a golf vacation and an off-road vehicle in Ducks team colors, which was driven onto the ice by retired Ducks star Selänne. In the game Getzlaf recorded an assist in a 6–3 loss to the Blues. After the game, Getzlaf was congratulated by his teammates and by every member of the Blues, including former teammate David Perron and fellow Regina native Tyler Bozak, in a moment resembling the handshake line at the end of a playoff series. Afterwards, Getzlaf gave an emotional address to the crowd before taking one final lap around the Honda Center and closing the books on his 17-year career.

Getzlaf ended his career with 282 goals, 737 assists and a total of 1,018 points in 1,157 games played. As of his retirement date, Getzlaf leads the Ducks in games played, assists, points and assists per game, and also holds the Ducks record for most assists in a season. He is the 35th player since 1980 to play his entire career with one NHL franchise (minimum of 10 seasons) and is only the 11th to play at least 17 seasons with the same team. He is 40th overall in most games played by a single player for a single franchise.

== International play ==
Medal record

Representing Canada

Olympic Games
Gold medal – first place	2010 Vancouver	
Gold medal – first place	2014 Sochi	

World Championships
Silver medal – second place	2008 Canada	

Canada Cup / World Cup
Gold medal – first place	2016 Toronto	

World Junior Championships
Gold medal – first place	2005 United States	
Silver medal – second place	2004 Finland	

IIHF World U18 Championships
Gold medal – first place	2003 Russia	

Getzlaf made his international debut as a member of the seventh-place Canada-West entry at the 2002 World U17 Hockey Challenge in Manitoba. The following year, he joined the Canadian under-18 team at the 2003 IIHF World U18 Championships. In seven games at the tournament, Getzlaf recorded two goals and two assists as Canada, in its second appearance at the event, won the nation's first gold medal at the U18 level.

Moving up to the national junior team, Getzlaf made his first of two appearances at the World Junior Hockey Championship in 2004. He recorded six points in six games for a Canadian squad that scored 25 goals in its four round-robin games and surrendered only four en route to a gold medal showdown with the United States. With Canada leading 3–1 early in the third period of the final, both Getzlaf and Sidney Crosby failed to capitalize on opportunities to add an extra goal that may have sealed a victory. Instead, Canada surrendered the lead, and Getzlaf and his teammates were forced to settle for the silver medal after goaltender Marc-André Fleury accidentally sent a clearing pass off a teammate and into his own net for the game-winning goal.

The 2004–05 lock-out ensured that several players who would otherwise have been playing in the NHL, including Getzlaf, were available to return to the national team for the 2005 World Junior Championship. One of 12 players with previous experience at the tournament for Canada, Getzlaf was a leading player for what many observers have called the greatest team in the tournament's history. With 12 points in 6 games, Getzlaf finished second in overall scoring to teammate Patrice Bergeron's 13. He scored one goal and added two assists in the championship game against Russia as the Canadians won the gold medal by a 6–1 score; it was the nation's first title in eight years at the event.

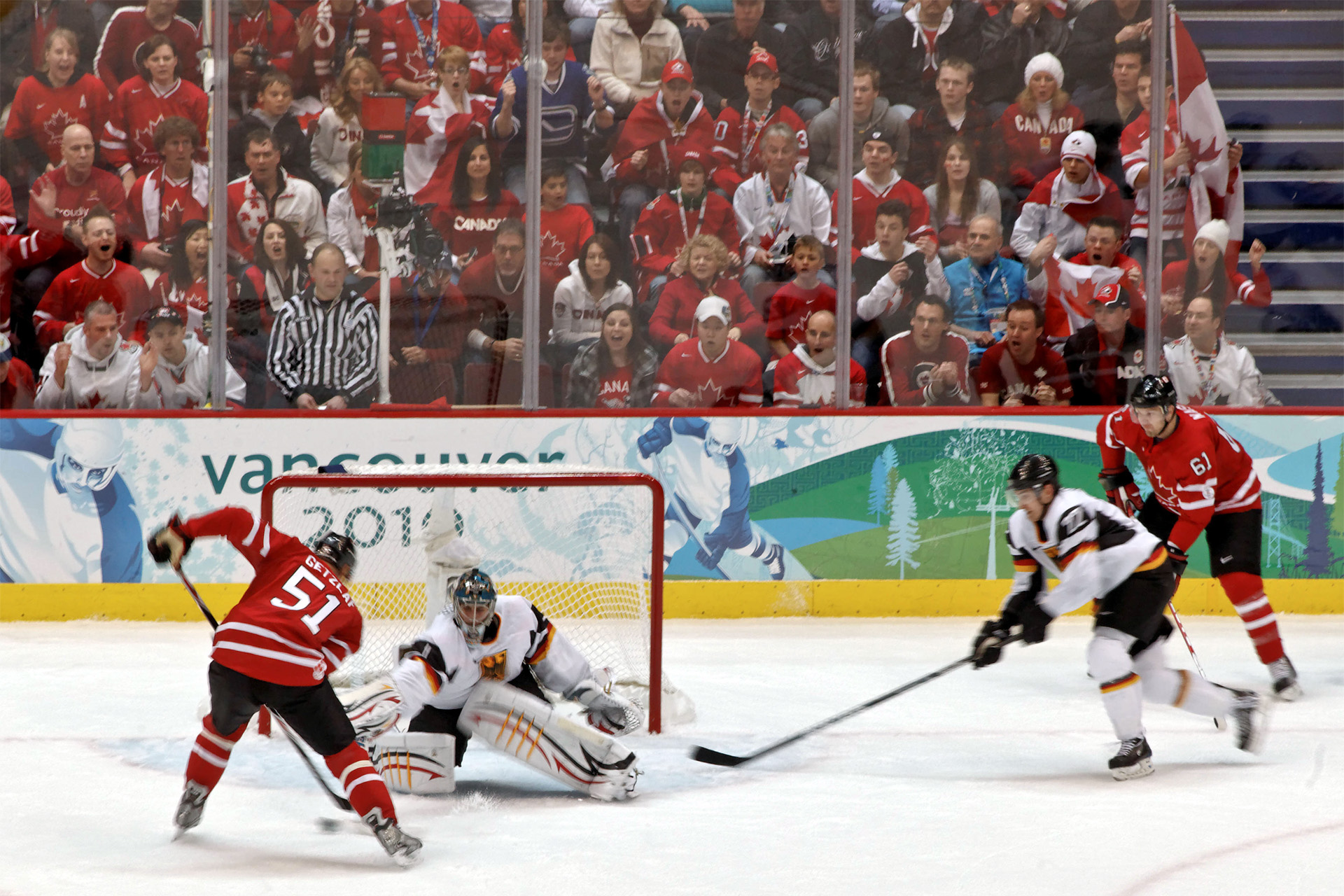
Getzlaf attempts a shot against German goaltender Thomas Greiss during the 2010 Winter Olympics

Getzlaf made his first appearance with the senior team at the 2008 World Championship. He led the tournament with 11 assists and his 14 points was second overall to teammate Dany Heatley's 20. Canada reached the championship game, but were forced to settle for the silver medal after Russia overcame a two-goal third period deficit and won the championship 5–4 in overtime. Getzlaf was named to the Canadian roster for the 2010 Winter Olympics in Vancouver, however a sprained ankle suffered during the NHL season left his participation in doubt until just before Canada was required to confirm its roster. He had recovered enough to play and recorded seven points in seven games, including the game-winning goal in Canada's 3–2 semi-final victory over Slovakia. Canada won the gold medal with a 3–2 overtime victory over the United States.

Two years later, Getzlaf served as Canada's captain at the 2012 World Championship. He tied for second in team scoring with nine points in eight games. However, Canada was eliminated in the quarterfinal against Slovakia, 4–3. Getzlaf was assessed a major penalty and game misconduct late in the game for kneeing Juraj Mikúš. A dejected Getzlaf lamented the result and his penalty following the game: "It hurts like hell right now. I feel like I let the guys down. To be in a hard-fought game like that and play the tournament we did and lose in that fashion, it's not easy to swallow as a group."

Returning to the Canadian roster for the 2014 Winter Olympics in Sochi, Getzlaf's play was cited, along with that of fellow centres Sidney Crosby and Jonathan Toews, as being one of the key aspects of Canada's successful defence of their Olympic title. Canada defeated Sweden by a 3–0 score to win the gold medal and repeat as Olympic champions.

== Personal life ==
Getzlaf and his wife, Paige (married in 2010) have four children together. An active member of the Orange County community, Getzlaf hosts an annual golf tournament on behalf of CureDuchenne, an organization that seeks a cure for Duchenne muscular dystrophy. He also maintains a program with the Calgary Hitmen called "Getzlaf's Gamers", which allows underprivileged children to attend games.

== Career statistics ==
=== Regular season and playoffs ===
Bold indicates led league

			Regular season					Playoffs
Season	Team	League	GP	G	A	Pts	PIM	GP	G	A	Pts	PIM
2001–02	Calgary Hitmen	WHL	63	9	9	18	34	7	2	1	3	4
2002–03	Calgary Hitmen	WHL	70	29	39	68	121	5	1	1	2	6
2003–04	Calgary Hitmen	WHL	49	28	47	75	97	7	5	1	6	6
2004–05	Calgary Hitmen	WHL	51	29	25	54	102	12	4	13	17	18
2004–05	Cincinnati Mighty Ducks	AHL	—	—	—	—	—	10	1	4	5	4
2005–06	Portland Pirates	AHL	17	8	25	33	36	—	—	—	—	—
2005–06	Mighty Ducks of Anaheim	NHL	57	14	25	39	22	16	3	4	7	13
2006–07	Anaheim Ducks	NHL	82	25	33	58	66	21	7	10	17	32
2007–08	Anaheim Ducks	NHL	77	24	58	82	94	6	2	3	5	6
2008–09	Anaheim Ducks	NHL	81	25	66	91	121	13	4	14	18	25
2009–10	Anaheim Ducks	NHL	66	19	50	69	79	—	—	—	—	—
2010–11	Anaheim Ducks	NHL	67	19	57	76	35	6	2	4	6	9
2011–12	Anaheim Ducks	NHL	82	11	46	57	75	—	—	—	—	—
2012–13	Anaheim Ducks	NHL	44	15	34	49	41	7	3	3	6	6
2013–14	Anaheim Ducks	NHL	77	31	56	87	31	12	4	11	15	10
2014–15	Anaheim Ducks	NHL	77	25	45	70	62	16	2	**18**	20	6
2015–16	Anaheim Ducks	NHL	77	13	50	63	55	7	2	3	5	4
2016–17	Anaheim Ducks	NHL	74	15	58	73	49	17	8	11	19	8
2017–18	Anaheim Ducks	NHL	56	11	50	61	42	4	0	2	2	18
2018–19	Anaheim Ducks	NHL	67	14	34	48	58	—	—	—	—	—
2019–20	Anaheim Ducks	NHL	69	13	29	42	58	—	—	—	—	—
2020–21	Anaheim Ducks	NHL	48	5	12	17	43	—	—	—	—	—
2021–22	Anaheim Ducks	NHL	56	3	34	37	29	—	—	—	—	—
NHL totals			1,157	282	737	1,019	960	125	37	83	120	137

=== International ===
Year	Team	Event	Result	GP	G	A	Pts	PIM
2002	Canada West	U17	7th	6	3	6	9	14
2003	Canada	WJC18	1st place, gold medalist(s)	7	2	2	4	10
2004	Canada	WJC	2nd place, silver medalist(s)	6	3	3	6	4
2005	Canada	WJC	1st place, gold medalist(s)	6	3	9	12	8
2008	Canada	WC	2nd place, silver medalist(s)	9	3	11	14	10
2010	Canada	OG	1st place, gold medalist(s)	7	3	4	7	2
2012	Canada	WC	5th	8	2	7	9	27
2014	Canada	OG	1st place, gold medalist(s)	6	1	2	3	4
2016	Canada	WCH	1st place, gold medalist(s)	5	0	3	3	4
Junior totals				25	11	20	31	36
Senior totals				33	9	27	36	47

== Awards and honours ==
Career
Award	Year	Ref.
WHL East first All-Star team	2003–04	
WHL East second All-Star team	2004–05	
Stanley Cup champion	2007	
NHL All-Star Game	2008, 2009, 2015	
NHL second All-Star team	2013–14	

== Records ==
Career
Record	Total	Ref.
Anaheim franchise record most assists, single season	66, 2008–09	
Anaheim franchise record consecutive games with an assist	10, October 24 – November 14, 2009 (tied with Corey Perry)	
Anaheim franchise record most assists, single game	5, October 29, 2008 (tied with Dmitri Mironov and Teemu Selänne)	

Awards and achievements
Preceded by Joffrey Lupul	Anaheim Mighty Ducks first-round draft pick 2003	Succeeded by Corey Perry
Sporting positions
Preceded by Scott Niedermayer	Anaheim Ducks captain 2010–22	Succeeded by Radko Gudas
