= List of Anaheim Ducks records =

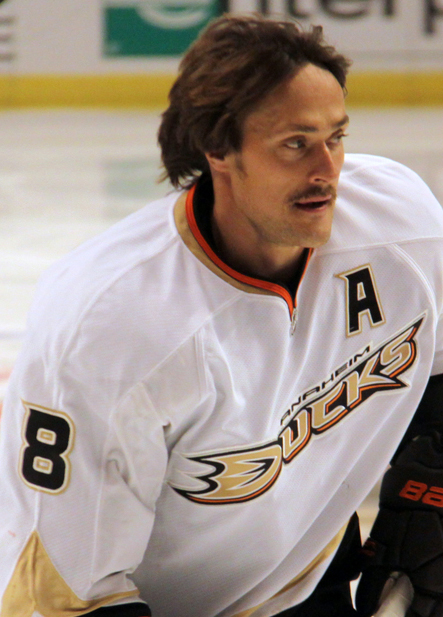
Teemu Selanne is the goal-scoring leader for the Anaheim Ducks.

This is a list of franchise records for the Anaheim Ducks of the National Hockey League.

== Regular season ==
=== All players ===
==== Points ====
Player	Ctry	Pos	GP	Pts	%
Ryan Getzlaf	(Canada)	C	1,157	1,019	0.88
Teemu Selanne	(Finland)	RW	966	988	1.02
Corey Perry	(Canada)	RW	988	776	0.79
Paul Kariya	(Canada)	LW	606	669	1.10
Steve Rucchin	(Canada)	C	616	432	0.70
Cam Fowler	(United States)	D	893	414	0.46
Rickard Rakell	(Sweden)	LW	550	339	0.62
Jakob Silfverberg	(Sweden)	RW	691	335	0.48
Bobby Ryan	(United States)	RW	378	289	0.76
Scott Niedermayer	(Canada)	D	371	264	0.71

==== Goals ====
Player	Ctry	Pos	GP	G	%
Teemu Selanne	(Finland)	RW	966	457	0.47
Corey Perry	(Canada)	RW	988	372	0.38
Paul Kariya	(Canada)	LW	606	300	0.50
Ryan Getzlaf	(Canada)	C	1,157	282	0.24
Rickard Rakell	(Sweden)	LW	550	154	0.28
Steve Rucchin	(Canada)	C	616	153	0.25
Jakob Silfverberg	(Sweden)	RW	691	151	0.22
Bobby Ryan	(United States)	RW	378	147	0.39
Adam Henrique	(Canada)	C	375	117	0.31
Andrew Cogliano	(Canada)	LW	584	102	0.17

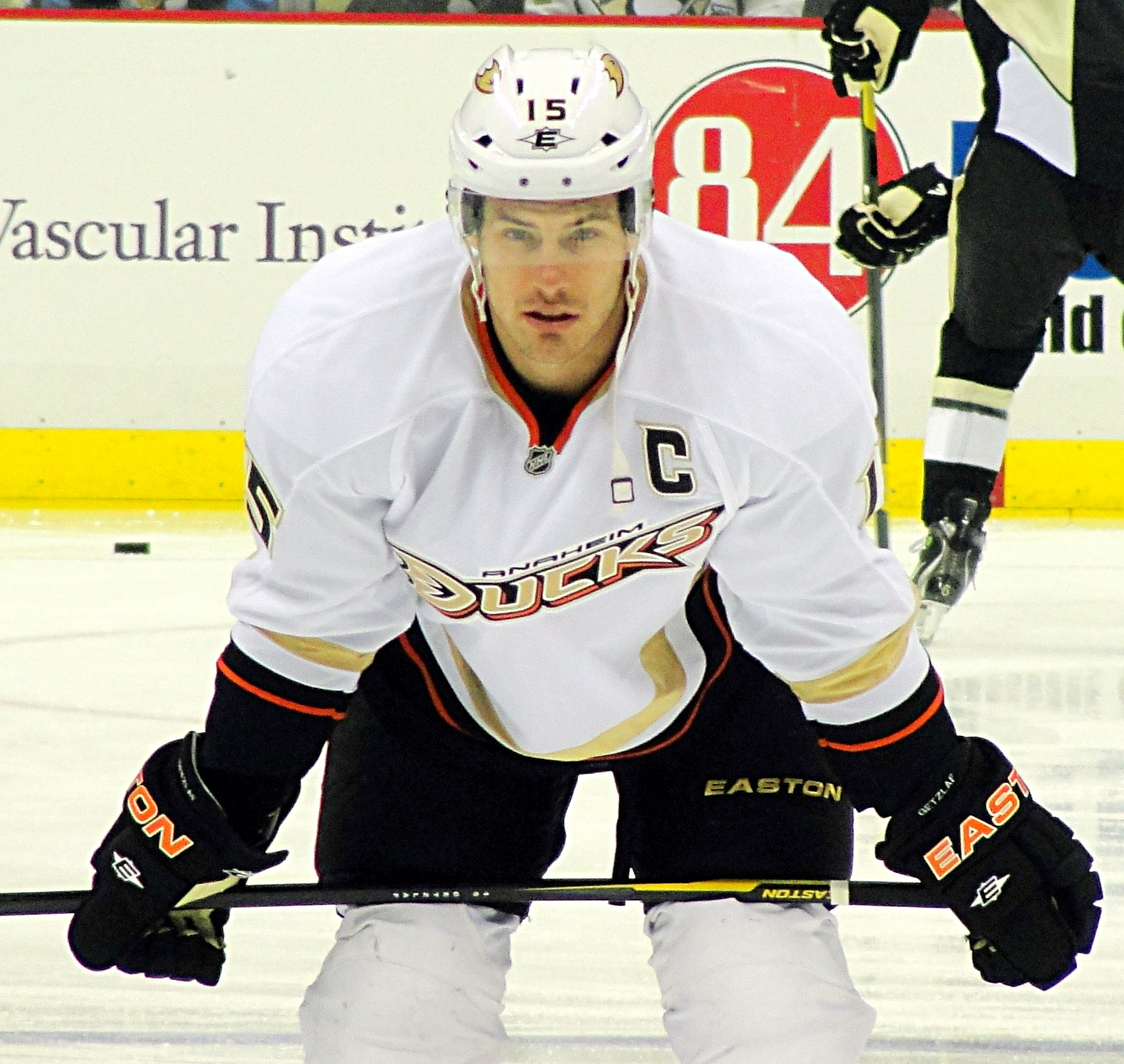
Ryan Getzlaf is the franchise leader in assists, games played, and playoff scoring. He also ranks top-4 in goals, points, and penalty minutes.

==== Assists ====
Player	Ctry	Pos	GP	A	%
Ryan Getzlaf	(Canada)	C	1,157	737	0.64
Teemu Selanne	(Finland)	RW	966	531	0.55
Corey Perry	(Canada)	RW	988	404	0.41
Paul Kariya	(Canada)	LW	606	369	0.61
Cam Fowler	(United States)	D	893	323	0.36
Steve Rucchin	(Canada)	C	616	279	0.45
Scott Niedermayer	(Canada)	D	371	204	0.55
Rickard Rakell	(Sweden)	LW	550	185	0.35
Jakob Silfverberg	(Sweden)	RW	691	184	0.27
Andy McDonald	(Canada)	LW	391	167	0.43

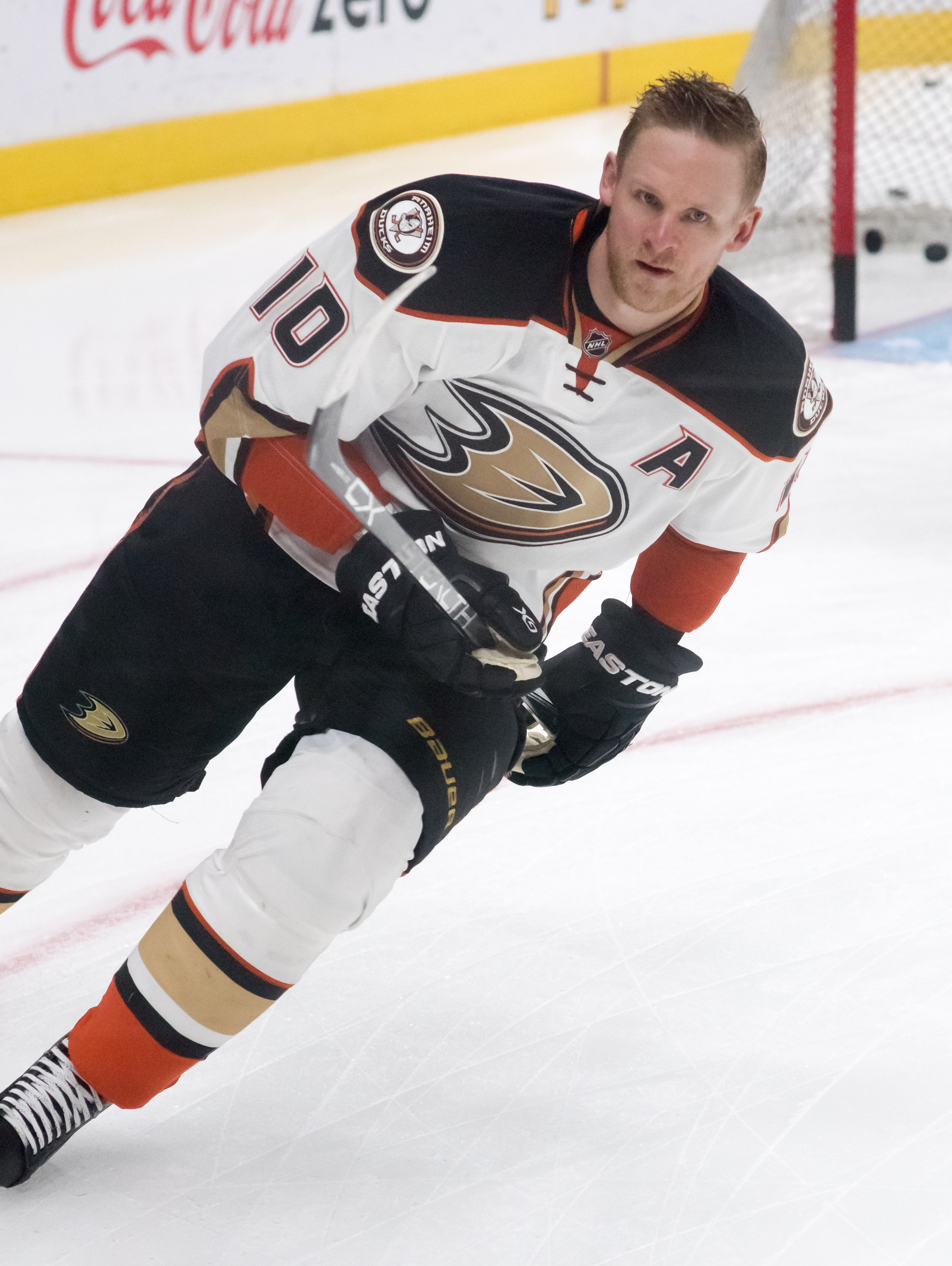
Corey Perry is the franchise leader in penalty minutes, while ranking top-3 in goals, assists, games played, game-winning goals, and power-play goals.

==== Games played ====
Player	Ctry	Pos	GP
Ryan Getzlaf	(Canada)	C	1,157
Corey Perry	(Canada)	RW	988
Teemu Selanne	(Finland)	RW	966
Cam Fowler	(United States)	D	893
Jakob Silfverberg	(Sweden)	RW	691
Steve Rucchin	(Canada)	C	616
Paul Kariya	(Canada)	LW	606
Ruslan Salei	(Belarus)	D	594
Francois Beauchemin	(Canada)	D	592
Andrew Cogliano	(Canada)	LW	584

==== Penalty minutes ====
Player	Ctry	Pos	PIM	GP	PIM/G
Corey Perry	(Canada)	RW	1110	988	1.14
Ryan Getzlaf	(Canada)	C	960	1,157	0.83
George Parros	(United States)	RW	812	356	2.28
Dave Karpa	(Canada)	D	788	245	3.22
Jason Marshall	(Canada)	D	740	370	2.00
Ruslan Salei	(Belarus)	D	735	594	1.24
Todd Ewen	(Canada)	RW	650	153	4.24
Stu Grimson	(Canada)	LW	583	231	2.52
Teemu Selanne	(Finland)	RW	471	966	0.49
Josh Manson	(United States)	D	431	453	0.95

==== Game-winning goals ====
Player	Ctry	Pos	GWG
Teemu Selanne	(Finland)	RW	77
Corey Perry	(Canada)	RW	64
Ryan Getzlaf	(Canada)	C	57
Paul Kariya	(Canada)	LW	44
Rickard Rakell	(Sweden)	LW	27
Steve Rucchin	(Canada)	C	23
Jakob Silfverberg	(Sweden)	RW	19
Cam Fowler	(United States)	D	18
Andrew Cogliano	(Canada)	LW	17
Adam Henrique	(Canada)	C	15
Chris Kunitz	(Canada)	LW	15
Andy McDonald	(Canada)	C	15
Bobby Ryan	(United States)	RW	15

==== Power-play goals ====
Player	Ctry	Pos	PP
Teemu Selanne	(Finland)	RW	182
Paul Kariya	(Canada)	LW	107
Corey Perry	(Canada)	RW	103
Ryan Getzlaf	(Canada)	C	86
Steve Rucchin	(Canada)	C	58
Scott Niedermayer	(Canada)	D	39
Cam Fowler	(United States)	D	36
Bobby Ryan	(United States)	RW	36
Rickard Rakell	(Sweden)	LW	33
Adam Henrique	(Canada)	C	28
Andy McDonald	(Canada)	C	28

==== Short-handed goals ====
Player	Ctry	Pos	SH
Andrew Cogliano	(Canada)	LW	16
Paul Kariya	(Canada)	LW	16
Jakob Silfverberg	(Sweden)	RW	10
Samuel Pahlsson	(Sweden)	C	9
Todd Marchant	(United States)	C	8
Ryan Getzlaf	(Canada)	C	8
Joe Sacco	(United States)	RW	6
Steve Rucchin	(Canada)	C	6
Corey Perry	(Canada)	RW	6
Derek Grant	(Canada)	C	5
Isac Lundestrom	(Sweden)	C	5

=== Defensemen ===
==== Points ====
Player	Ctry	GP	Pts	%
Cam Fowler	(United States)	893	414	0.46
Scott Niedermayer	(Canada)	371	264	0.71
Hampus Lindholm	(Sweden)	582	222	0.38
Francois Beauchemin	(Canada)	592	196	0.33
Oleg Tverdovsky	(Russia)	324	170	0.52
Chris Pronger	(Canada)	220	150	0.68
Fredrik Olausson	(Sweden)	244	127	0.52
Sami Vatanen	(Finland)	280	126	0.45
Josh Manson	(United States)	453	113	0.25
Lubomir Visnovsky	(Slovakia)	165	108	0.65

=== Goaltenders ===
==== Games played ====
Player	Ctry	GP
John Gibson	(United States)	506
Jean-Sebastien Giguere	(Canada)	447
Guy Hebert	(United States)	441
Jonas Hiller	(Switzerland)	326
Frederik Andersen	(Denmark)	125
Mikhail Shtalenkov	(Russia)	122
Ryan Miller	(United States)	87
Ilya Bryzgalov	(Russia)	77
Anthony Stolarz	(United States)	56
Martin Gerber	(Switzerland)	54

==== Wins ====
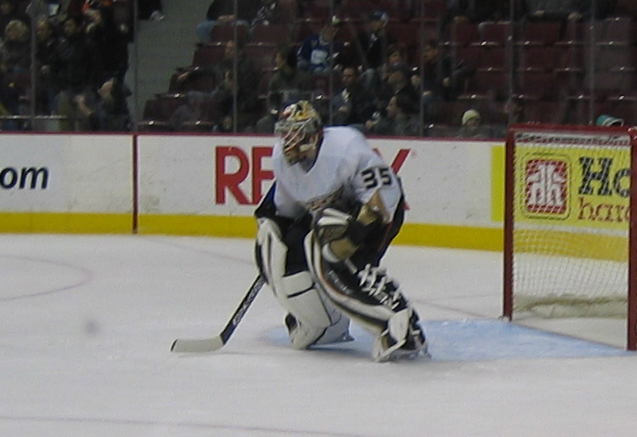
Jean-Sebastian Giguere is the franchise leader in wins, shutouts.

Player	Ctry	GP	W	%
Jean-Sebastien Giguere	(Canada)	447	206	0.46
John Gibson	(United States)	506	204	0.40
Guy Hebert	(United States)	441	173	0.39
Jonas Hiller	(Switzerland)	326	162	0.50
Frederik Andersen	(Denmark)	125	77	0.62
Mikhail Shtalenkov	(Russia)	122	34	0.28
Ryan Miller	(United States)	87	33	0.38
Ilya Bryzgalov	(Russia)	77	27	0.35
Anthony Stolarz	(United States)	56	21	0.37
Jonathan Bernier	(Canada)	39	21	0.54

==== Shutouts ====
Player	Ctry	GP	SO	%
Jean-Sebastien Giguere	(Canada)	447	32	0.07
Guy Hebert	(United States)	441	27	0.06
John Gibson	(United States)	506	24	0.05
Jonas Hiller	(Switzerland)	326	21	0.06
Frederik Andersen	(Denmark)	125	6	0.05
Ryan Miller	(United States)	87	5	0.07
Viktor Fasth	(Sweden)	30	4	0.13
Anthony Stolarz	(United States)	37	4	0.11
Martin Gerber	(Switzerland)	54	3	0.06
Mikhail Shtalenkov	(Russia)	122	3	0.02

==== Goals against average ====
Player	Ctry	GP	GAA
Martin Gerber	(Switzerland)	54	2.13
Viktor Fasth	(Sweden)	30	2.32
Frederik Andersen	(Denmark)	125	2.33
Jean-Sebastien Giguere	(Canada)	447	2.47
Jonathan Bernier	(Canada)	39	2.50
Jonas Hiller	(Switzerland)	326	2.51
Ilya Bryzgalov	(Russia)	77	2.63
Steve Shields	(Canada)	33	2.67
Guy Hebert	(United States)	441	2.75
John Gibson	(United States)	506	2.89

*minimum 25 games played

==== Save percentage ====
Player	Ctry	GP	SV%
Martin Gerber	(Switzerland)	54	.923
Frederik Andersen	(Denmark)	125	.918
Jonas Hiller	(Switzerland)	326	.916
Jonathan Bernier	(Canada)	39	.915
Viktor Fasth	(Sweden)	30	.915
Jean-Sebastien Giguere	(Canada)	447	.914
Anthony Stolarz	(United States)	56	.913
John Gibson	(United States)	431	.912
Guy Hebert	(United States)	441	.911
Ryan Miller	(United States)	87	.910

*minimum 25 games played

== Playoffs ==
=== All players ===
==== Points ====
Player	Ctry	Pos	GP	Pts	PPG
Ryan Getzlaf	(Canada)	C	125	120	0.96
Corey Perry	(Canada)	RW	118	89	0.75
Teemu Selanne	(Finland)	RW	96	69	0.72
Jakob Silfverberg	(Sweden)	RW	57	41	0.72
Francois Beauchemin	(Canada)	D	101	39	0.39
Scott Niedermayer	(Canada)	D	56	34	0.61
Cam Fowler	(United States)	D	62	33	0.53
Chris Pronger	(Canada)	D	38	30	0.79
Paul Kariya	(Canada)	LW	35	29	0.83
Ryan Kesler	(United States)	C	44	27	0.61

==== Goals ====
Player	Ctry	Pos	GP	G	%
Ryan Getzlaf	(Canada)	C	125	37	0.30
Corey Perry	(Canada)	RW	118	36	0.31
Teemu Selanne	(Finland)	RW	96	35	0.36
Jakob Silfverberg	(Sweden)	RW	57	16	0.28
Paul Kariya	(Canada)	LW	35	14	0.40
Matt Beleskey	(Canada)	LW	34	13	0.38
Andy McDonald	(Canada)	C	37	12	0.32
Ryan Kesler	(United States)	C	44	12	0.27
Rickard Rakell	(Sweden)	LW	46	11	0.24
Bobby Ryan	(United States)	RW	26	10	0.38

==== Assists ====
Player	Ctry	Pos	GP	A	%
Ryan Getzlaf	(Canada)	C	125	83	0.66
Corey Perry	(Canada)	RW	118	53	0.45
Teemu Selanne	(Finland)	RW	96	34	0.35
Francois Beauchemin	(Canada)	D	101	29	0.29
Cam Fowler	(Canada)	D	62	27	0.44
Scott Niedermayer	(Canada)	D	56	26	0.46
Jakob Silfverberg	(Sweden)	RW	57	25	0.44
Chris Pronger	(Canada)	D	38	23	0.61
Rob Niedermayer	(Canada)	C	73	18	0.25
Sami Vatanen	(Finland)	D	40	17	0.43

==== Games played ====
Player	Ctry	Pos	GP
Ryan Getzlaf	(Canada)	C	125
Corey Perry	(Canada)	RW	118
Francois Beauchemin	(Canada)	D	101
Teemu Selanne	(Finland)	RW	96
Rob Niedermayer	(Canada)	C	73
Samuel Pahlsson	(Sweden)	C	64
Andrew Cogliano	(Canada)	LW	64
Cam Fowler	(Canada)	D	62
Jakob Silfverberg	(Sweden)	RW	57
Scott Niedermayer	(Canada)	D	56

==== Penalty minutes ====
Player	Ctry	Pos	PIM
Corey Perry	(Canada)	RW	186
Ryan Getzlaf	(Canada)	C	137
Francois Beauchemin	(Canada)	D	80
Rob Niedermayer	(Canada)	C	79
Ryan Kesler	(United States)	C	62
Scott Niedermayer	(Canada)	D	55
Nick Ritchie	(Canada)	LW	54
Teemu Selanne	(Finland)	RW	54
Chris Pronger	(Canada)	D	50
Samuel Pahlsson	(Sweden)	C	50

==== Game-winning goals ====
Player	Ctry	Pos	GWG
Teemu Selanne	(Finland)	RW	8
Corey Perry	(Canada)	RW	8
Ryan Getzlaf	(Canada)	C	6
Scott Niedermayer	(Canada)	D	5
Matt Beleskey	(Canada)	LW	4
Jakob Silfverberg	(Sweden)	RW	4
Samuel Pahlsson	(Sweden)	C	4
Steve Thomas	(Canada)	RW	3
Nick Bonino	(United States)	C	3
Travis Moen	(Canada)	LW	3

==== Power play goals ====
Player	Ctry	Pos	PP
Teemu Selanne	(Finland)	RW	15
Ryan Getzlaf	(Canada)	C	15
Corey Perry	(Canada)	RW	9
Francois Beauchemin	(Canada)	D	8
Andy McDonald	(Canada)	C	7
Matt Beleskey	(Canada)	LW	5
Scott Niedermayer	(Canada)	D	5
Patrick Maroon	(United States)	LW	4
Paul Kariya	(Canada)	LW	4
Chris Pronger	(Canada)	D	4

==== Short-handed goals ====
Player	Ctry	Pos	SH
Rob Niedermayer	(Canada)	C	3
Ryan Getzlaf	(Canada)	C	2
Kurt Sauer	(United States)	D	1
Scott Niedermayer	(Canada)	D	1
Andrew Cogliano	(Canada)	C	1
Corey Perry	(Canada)	RW	1

=== Defensemen ===
==== Points ====
Player	Ctry	GP	Pts	%
Francois Beauchemin	(Canada)	101	39	0.39
Scott Niedermayer	(Canada)	56	34	0.61
Cam Fowler	(United States)	62	33	0.53
Chris Pronger	(Canada)	38	30	0.79
Sami Vatanen	(Finland)	40	22	0.55
Hampus Lindholm	(Sweden)	55	21	0.38
Dmitri Mironov	(Russia)	11	11	1.00
Ruslan Salei	(Belarus)	40	10	0.25
J. J. Daigneault	(Canada)	11	9	0.82
Sean O'Donnell	(Canada)	43	9	0.21

=== Goaltenders ===
==== Games played ====
Player	Ctry	GP
Jean-Sebastien Giguere	(Canada)	52
Frederik Andersen	(Denmark)	28
John Gibson	(United States)	26
Jonas Hiller	(Switzerland)	26
Ilya Bryzgalov	(Russia)	16
Guy Hebert	(United States)	13
Ray Emery	(Canada)	6
Mikhail Shtalenkov	(Russia)	4
Jonathan Bernier	(Canada)	4
Martin Gerber	(Switzerland)	2

==== Wins ====
Player	Ctry	GP	W	%
Jean-Sebastien Giguere	(Canada)	52	33	0.63
Frederik Andersen	(Denmark)	28	17	0.61
Jonas Hiller	(Switzerland)	26	12	0.46
John Gibson	(United States)	26	11	0.42
Ilya Bryzgalov	(Russia)	16	9	0.56
Guy Hebert	(United States)	13	4	0.31
Ray Emery	(Canada)	6	2	0.33
Jonathan Bernier	(Canada)	4	1	0.25

==== Goals against average ====
Player	Ctry	GP	GAA
Ilya Bryzgalov	(Russia)	16	1.68
Jean-Sebastien Giguere	(Canada)	52	2.08
Jonas Hiller	(Switzerland)	26	2.29
Frederik Andersen	(Denmark)	28	2.34
Guy Hebert	(United States)	13	2.67
John Gibson	(United States)	26	2.80
Mikhail Shtalenkov	(Russia)	4	2.84
Ray Emery	(Canada)	6	3.19
Jonathan Bernier	(Canada)	4	3.29

*minimum 100 minutes played

==== Save percentage ====
Player	Ctry	GP	SV%
Mikhail Shtalenkov	(Russia)	4	.938
Ilya Bryzgalov	(Russia)	16	.937
Jonas Hiller	(Switzerland)	26	.932
Jean-Sebastien Giguere	(Canada)	52	.925
Frederik Andersen	(Denmark)	28	.916
Guy Hebert	(United States)	13	.913
John Gibson	(United States)	26	.912
Ray Emery	(Canada)	6	.897
Jonathan Bernier	(Canada)	4	.873

*minimum 100 minutes played

==== Shutouts ====
Player	Ctry	GP	SO	%
Jean-Sebastien Giguere	(Canada)	52	6	0.12
Ilya Bryzgalov	(Russia)	16	3	0.19
Jonas Hiller	(Switzerland)	26	3	0.12
Frederik Andersen	(Denmark)	28	2	0.07
Guy Hebert	(United States)	13	1	0.08
John Gibson	(United States)	26	1	0.04

== Franchise records ==
=== Franchise single season ===
Most points	116	2013–14
Most wins	54	2013–14
Most losses	46	1993–94 (84 game season)
Most ties^{†}	13	1996–97, 1997–98, 1998–99
Most overtime losses^{‡}	14	2006–07, 2021–22
Most goals for	263	2013–14
Most goals against	271	2021–22
Fewest points	37; 43; 65	1994–95 (48 game season); 2020–21 (56 game season); 1997–98
Fewest wins	16; 17; 25	1994–95 (48 game season); 2020–21 (56 game season); 2000–01
Fewest losses	12; 20	2012–13 (48 game season); 2006–07, 2013–14
Fewest ties^{†}	5	1993–94 (84 game season); 1994–95 (48 game season)
Fewest overtime losses^{‡}	3	1999–2000, 2001–02
Fewest goals for	124; 125; 175	2020–21 (56 game season); 1994–95 (48 game season); 2001–02
Fewest goals against	115; 177; 184	2012–13 (48 game season); 2020–21 (56 game season); 2007–08
Most penalty minutes	1843	1997–98
Fewest penalty minutes	731; 926	1994–95 (48 game season); 1999–2000
Most shutouts	9	2002–03 (Jean-Sebastien Giguere 8, Martin Gerber 1)

- † Ties are no longer an official NHL statistic since the 2005–06 NHL season
- ‡ Overtime losses became an official NHL statistic in the 1999–2000 NHL season and replaced the 'tie' statistic beginning in the 2005–06 NHL season

=== Franchise single game ===
Most goals for	9	January 15, 2014 vs VAN
Most goals against	9	February 1, 1995 vs DAL, February 19, 2011 at STL, February 2, 2019 at WPG
Biggest goal differential (win)	+8	(final 1–9) January 15, 2014 vs VAN
Biggest goal differential (loss)	-7	(final 2-9) February 1, 1995 vs DAL
Most shots for	56	October 13, 2013 vs OTT
Least shots for	12	twice '94, '96
Most shots against	57	March 21, 2004 vs DET
Least shots against	11	January 23, 2004 vs MIN
Most penalty minutes	107	December 8, 2001 vs CGY
Longest game	80:48	April 24, 2003 at DAL

=== Streaks ===
Winning streaks
Overall	11	February 13, 2016 – March 5, 2016
Home	10	February 17, 2008 – March 26, 2008
Away	7	November 28, 2006 – December 13, 2006
Losing streaks
Overall	12	December 18, 2018 – January 18, 2019
Home	8	January 10, 2001 – February 9, 2001
Away	7	October 8, 2005 – November 12, 2005
Undefeated streaks
Overall	16	October 6, 2006 – November 9, 2006
Home	22	October 10, 2013 – January 21, 2014
Away	7	November 28, 2006 – December 13, 2006, November 30, 2013 - December 23, 2013
Winless streaks
Overall	12	December 18, 2018 — January 18, 2019
Home	11	January 5, 2001 – February 14, 2001
Away	13	November 1, 2003 – December 27, 2003
Consecutive playoff appearances
6		2013 – 2018

== Individual records ==
=== Career leaders ===
	All-time leader		Active leader^{†}	
Games	1,157	Ryan Getzlaf	811	Cam Fowler
Games (defenseman)	811	Cam Fowler	811	Cam Fowler
Consecutive games	502	Andrew Cogliano	82	Kevin Shattenkirk
Points	1,019	Ryan Getzlaf	366	Cam Fowler
Points (defenseman)	366	Cam Fowler	366	Cam Fowler
Goals	457	Teemu Selanne	141	Jakob Silfverberg
Goals (defenseman)	81	Cam Fowler	81	Cam Fowler
Power play goals	182	Teemu Selanne	32	Cam Fowler
Power play goals (defenseman)	32	Cam Fowler	32	Cam Fowler
Shorthanded goals	16	Paul Kariya, Andrew Cogliano	10	Jakob Silfverberg
Game winning goals	77	Teemu Selanne	17	Cam Fowler, Jakob Silfverberg
Overtime goals	11	Ryan Getzlaf	4	Cam Fowler
Hat tricks	9	Teemu Selanne	9	Teemu Selanne
Assists	737	Ryan Getzlaf	285	Cam Fowler
Assists (defenseman)	285	Cam Fowler	285	Cam Fowler
Plus/minus	120	Teemu Selanne	12	Jakob Silfverberg
Shots	2,964	Teemu Selanne	1,466	Jakob Silfverberg
Penalty minutes	1,110	Corey Perry	217	Cam Fowler
Goaltender games	447	Jean-Sebastien Giguere	378	John Gibson
Goaltender minutes	25,646	Jean-Sebastien Giguere	21,674	John Gibson
Goaltender wins	206	Jean-Sebastien Giguere	166	John Gibson
Shutouts	32	Jean-Sebastien Giguere	23	John Gibson
Goals against average^{††}	2.13	Martin Gerber	2.67	John Gibson
Save percentage^{‡}	0.923	Martin Gerber	0.920	Anthony Stolarz
Goaltender assists	8	Jonas Hiller	4	John Gibson
Coaching wins	138	Randy Carlyle	138	Randy Carlyle

- † At the end of the 2007–08 NHL season
- †† Minimum 50 games played
- ‡ Minimum 500 shots against

=== Single season leaders ===
	All-time leader	
Points	109	Teemu Selanne (1996–97)
Points (defenseman)	69	Scott Niedermayer (2006–07)
Points (rookie)	61	Trevor Zegras (2021–22)
Goals	52	Teemu Selanne (1997–98)
Goals (defenseman)	18	Lubomir Visnovsky (2010–11)
Goals (rookie)	31	Bobby Ryan (2008–09)
Power play goals	25	Teemu Selanne (1998–99, 2006–07)
Shorthanded goals	3	Bob Corkum (1993–94); Paul Kariya (1995–96, 1996–97, 1999–2000, 2000–01); Samuel Pahlsson (2005–06, 2007–08); Todd Marchant (2006–07)
Game winning goals	10	Paul Kariya (1996–97); Teemu Selanne (1997–98, 2006–07)
Overtime goals	3	Paul Kariya (1995–96)
Assists	66	Ryan Getzlaf (2008–09)
Assists (defenseman)	54	Scott Niedermayer (2006–07)
Assists (rookie)	38	Trevor Zegras (2021–22)
Plus/minus	+36	Paul Kariya (1996–97)
Shots	429	Paul Kariya (1998–99)
Penalty minutes	285	Todd Ewen (1995–96)
Goaltender games	73	Jonas Hiller (2011-12)
Goaltender wins	36	Jean-Sebastien Giguere (2006–07)
Shutouts	8	Jean-Sebastien Giguere (2002–03)
Goals against average	1.95	Martin Gerber (2002–03)
Save percentage	.929	Martin Gerber (2002–03)
Goaltender assists	2	Guy Hebert (1999–2000); Mikhail Shtalenkov (1995–96); Jean-Sebastien Giguere (2000–01, 2003–04, 2006–07); Ilya Bryzgalov (2005–06)

=== Individual single game leaders ===
	Player(s)	
Points (single player)	5	25 times
Points (defenseman)	5	Dmitri Mironov (5 assists)
Points (rookie)	4	twice Stanislav Chistov, '02, Ryan Getzlaf, '06
Points (single period)	4	Four times, Paul Kariya (3 times), Vaclav Prospal (once)
Goals	3	25 times
Goals (defenseman)	2	19 times
Goals (rookie)	2	multiple times
Goals (single period)	3	Teemu Selanne (twice)
Power play goals	3	Paul Kariya, '01 vs SJS
Shorthanded goals	1	95 times
Assists	5	Dmitri Mironov, Ryan Getzlaf, '15 vs. Calgary Flames
Assists (defenseman)	5	Dmitri Mironov
Assists (rookie)	4	Ryan Getzlaf, '06 vs NSH
Assists (single period)	4	Paul Kariya, '98 vs NSH
Shots (Game)	12	Paul Kariya (3 times)
Shots (Period)	9	Paul Kariya, '98 vs DET (1st)
Penalty minutes	37	Todd Ewen (6 penalties) '96 vs SJS
Goaltender shots faced (game)	57	Jean-Sebastien Giguere, '04 vs DET
Goaltender shots faced (period)	24	Guy Hebert, '95 vs DET
Goaltender saves	51	twice Mikhail Shtalenkov, '98, Jean-Sebastien Giguere, '04
