= List of Anaheim Ducks award winners =

Award winners of American ice hockey team

Anaheim Ducks awards
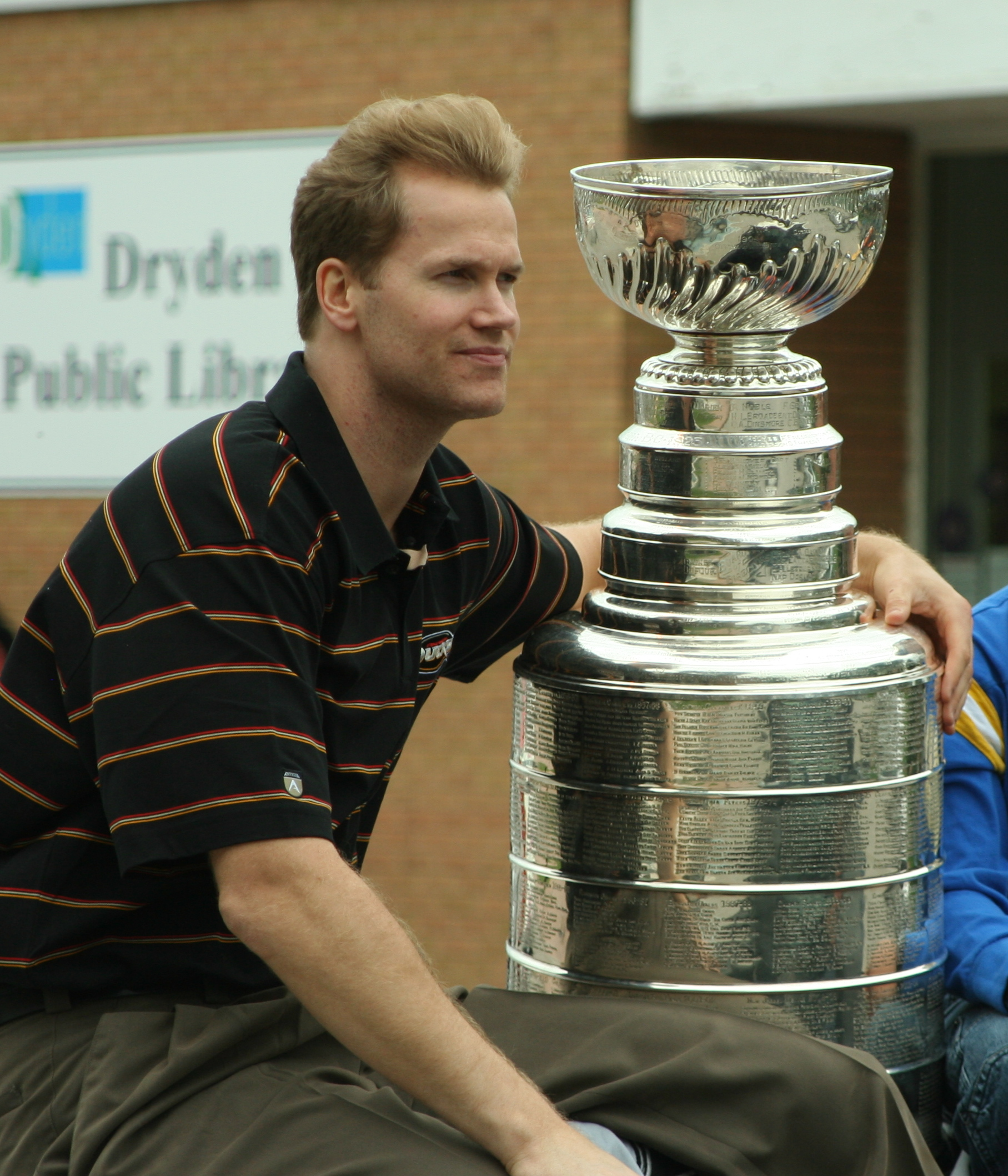
- Chris Pronger with the Stanley Cup

Team trophies
- Award*: Wins
- Stanley Cup: 1
- Clarence S. Campbell Bowl: 2

Individual awards
- Award*: Wins
- Bill Masterton Memorial Trophy: 1
- Conn Smythe Trophy: 2
- General Manager of the Year Award: 1
- Hart Memorial Trophy: 1
- Lady Byng Memorial Trophy: 2
- Lester Patrick Trophy: 1
- Maurice "Rocket" Richard Trophy: 2
- William M. Jennings Trophy: 1

Total
- Awards won: 14

This is a list of Anaheim Ducks award winners.

== League awards ==
=== Team trophies ===
Team trophies awarded to the Anaheim Ducks
Award	Description	Times won	Seasons	References
Stanley Cup	NHL championship	1	2006–07	
Clarence S. Campbell Bowl	Western Conference playoff championship	2	2002–03, 2006–07	

=== Individual awards ===
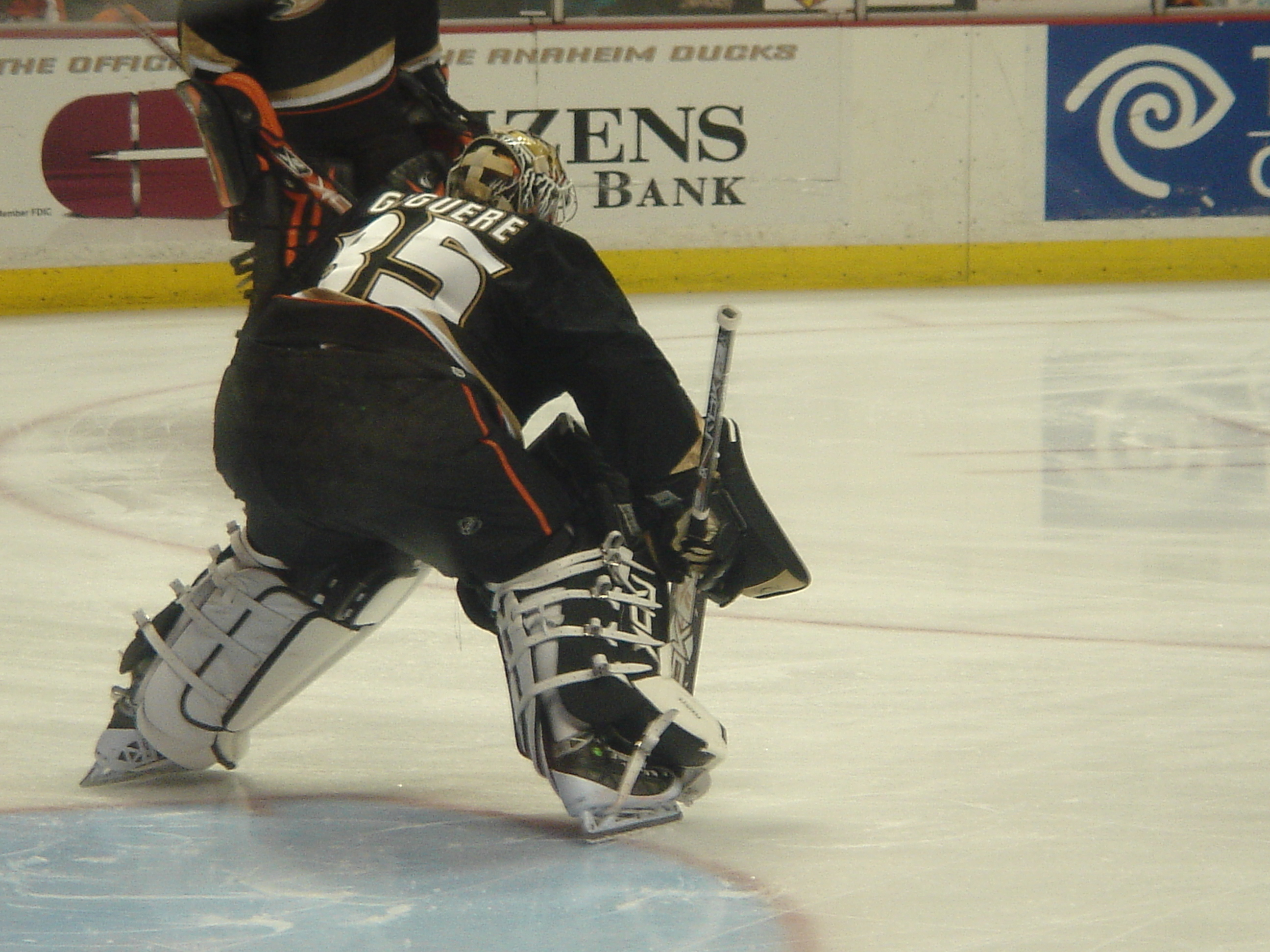
In 2002–03, Jean-Sebastien Giguere became the third player to win the Conn Smythe Trophy in a losing effort.

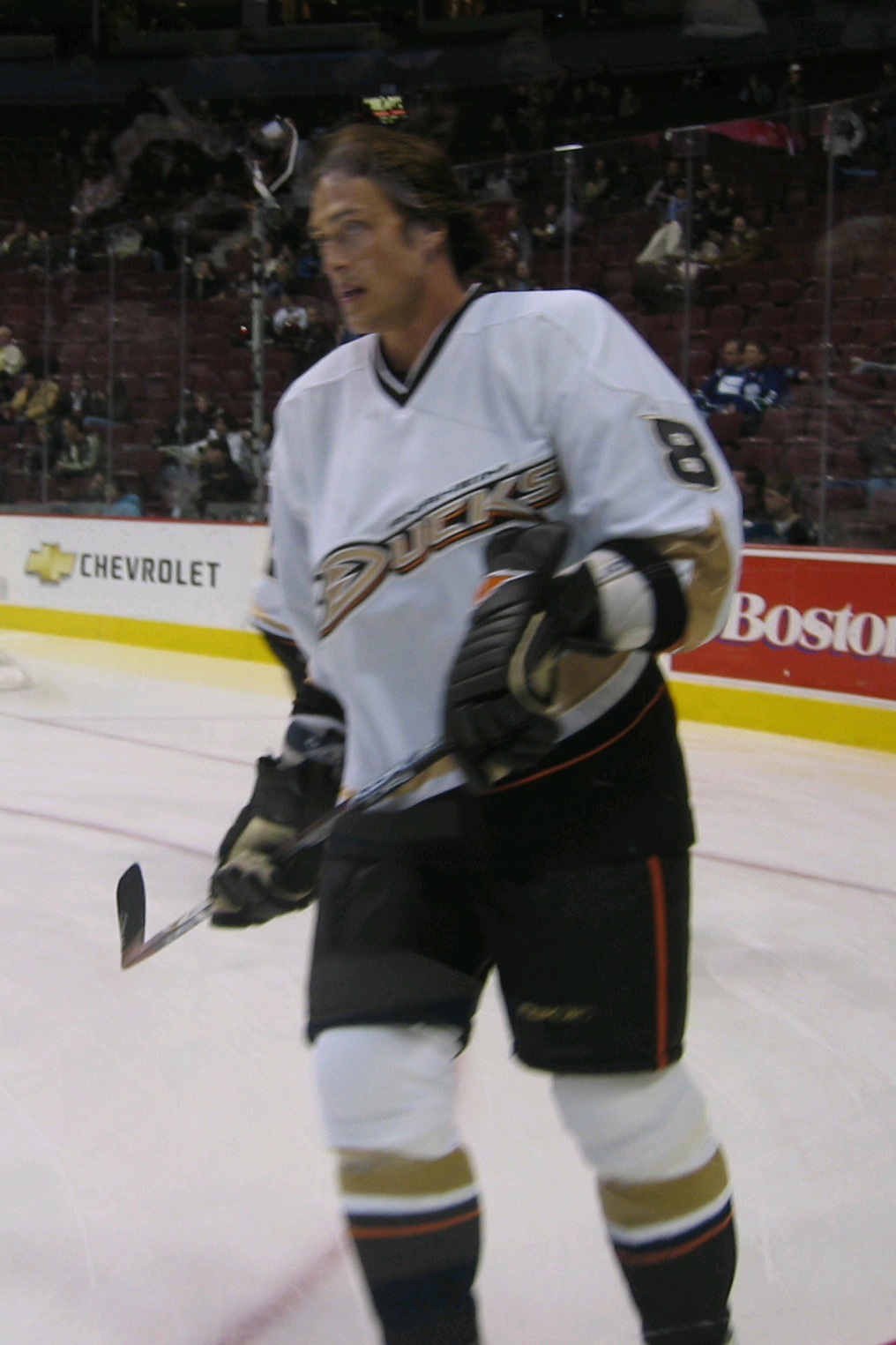
Teemu Selanne's 47 goals during the 1998–99 season earned him the Maurice "Rocket" Richard Trophy, the first season the trophy was awarded.

Individual awards won by Anaheim Ducks players and staff
Award	Description	Winner	Season	References
Bill Masterton Memorial Trophy	Perseverance, sportsmanship and dedication to hockey	Teemu Selanne	2005–06	
Conn Smythe Trophy	Most valuable player of the playoffs	Jean-Sebastien Giguere	2002–03	
Conn Smythe Trophy	Most valuable player of the playoffs	Scott Niedermayer	2006–07	
General manager of the Year Award	Top general manager	Bob Murray	2013–14	
Hart Memorial Trophy	Most valuable player to his team during the regular season	Corey Perry	2010–11	
Lady Byng Memorial Trophy	Gentlemanly conduct	Paul Kariya	1995–96	
Lady Byng Memorial Trophy	Gentlemanly conduct	Paul Kariya	1996–97	
Maurice "Rocket" Richard Trophy	Most goals in the regular season	Teemu Selanne	1998–99	
Maurice "Rocket" Richard Trophy	Most goals in the regular season	Corey Perry	2010–11	
William M. Jennings Trophy	Fewest goals given up in the regular season	Frederik Andersen	2015–16	
William M. Jennings Trophy	Fewest goals given up in the regular season	John Gibson	2015–16	

== All-Stars ==
=== NHL first and second team All-Stars ===
The NHL first and second team All-Stars are the top players at each position as voted on by the Professional Hockey Writers' Association.

Anaheim Ducks selected to the NHL First and Second Team All-Stars
Player	Position	Selections	Season	Team
Francois Beauchemin	Defense	1	2012–13	2nd
Ryan Getzlaf	Center	1	2013–14	2nd
Paul Kariya	Left wing	5	1995–96	1st
Paul Kariya	Left wing	5	1996–97	1st
Paul Kariya	Left wing	5	1998–99	1st
Paul Kariya	Left wing	5	1999–2000	2nd
Paul Kariya	Left wing	5	2002–03	2nd
Scott Niedermayer	Defense	2	2005–06	1st
Scott Niedermayer	Defense	2	2006–07	1st
Corey Perry	Right wing	2	2010–11	1st
Corey Perry	Right wing	2	2013–14	1st
Chris Pronger	Defense	1	2006–07	2nd
Teemu Selanne	Right wing	3	1996–97	1st
Teemu Selanne	Right wing	3	1997–98	2nd
Teemu Selanne	Right wing	3	1998–99	2nd
Lubomir Visnovsky	Defense	1	2010–11	2nd

=== NHL All-Rookie Team ===
The NHL All-Rookie Team consists of the top rookies at each position as voted on by the Professional Hockey Writers' Association.

Anaheim Ducks selected to the NHL All-Rookie Team
Player	Position	Season
Frederik Andersen	Goaltender	2013–14
Cutter Gauthier	Forward	2024–25
John Gibson	Goaltender	2015–16
Paul Kariya	Forward	1994–95
Hampus Lindholm	Defense	2013–14
Bobby Ryan	Forward	2008–09
Beckett Sennecke	Forward	2025–26
Trevor Zegras	Forward	2021–22

=== All-Star Game selections ===
The National Hockey League All-Star Game is a mid-season exhibition game held annually between many of the top players of each season. Twenty All-Star Games have been held since the Ducks entered the league in 1993, with at least one player chosen to represent the Ducks in each year except 2004. The All-Star game has not been held in various years: 1979 and 1987 due to the 1979 Challenge Cup and Rendez-vous '87 series between the NHL and the Soviet national team, respectively, 1995, 2005, and 2013 as a result of labor stoppages, 2006, 2010, 2014 and 2026 because of the Winter Olympic Games, 2021 as a result of the COVID-19 pandemic, and 2025 when it was replaced by the 2025 4 Nations Face-Off.

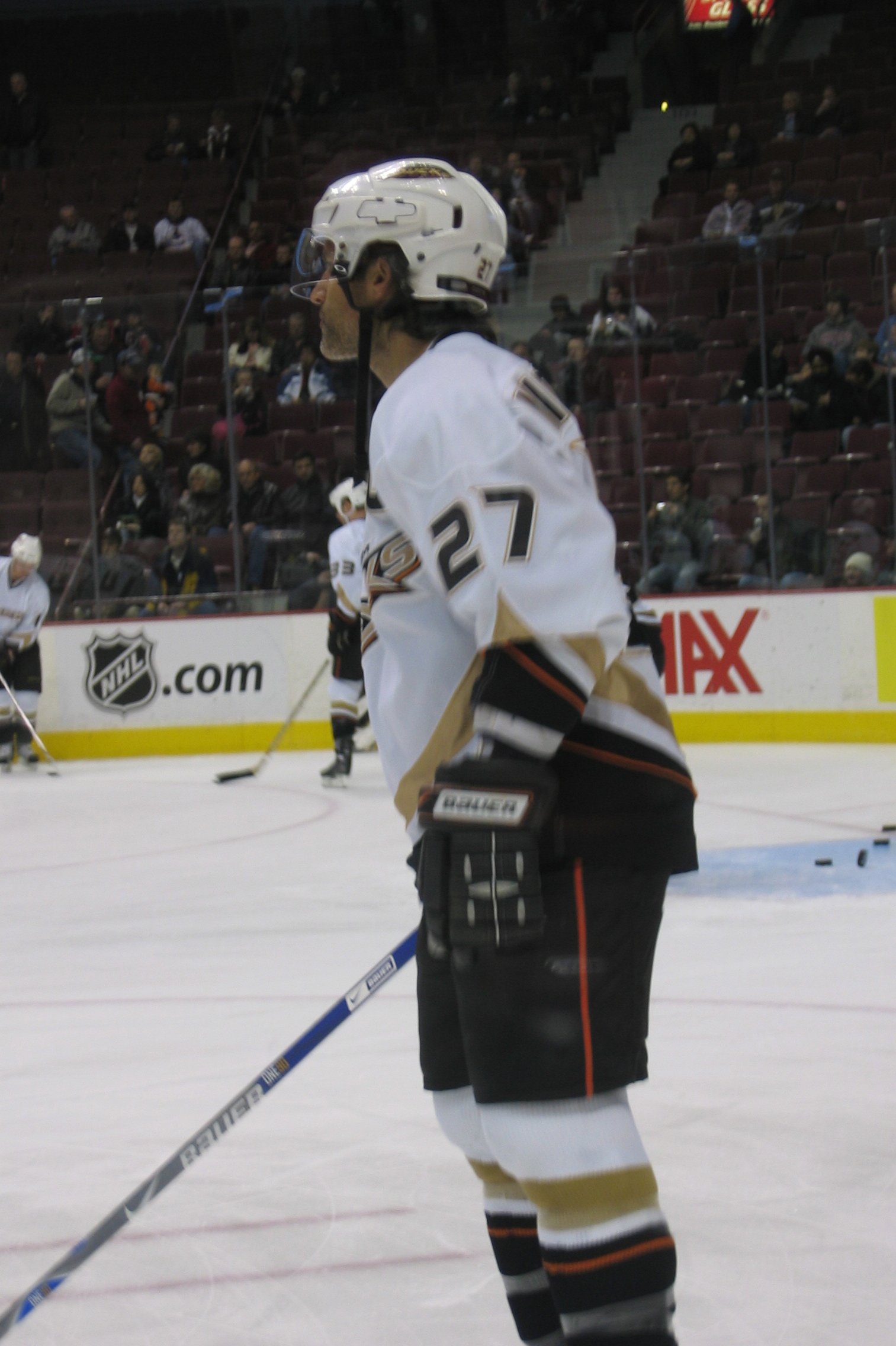
Scott Niedermayer was selected to play in three NHL All-Star games with the Ducks.

- † Selected by fan vote
- # Selected as one of four "last men in" by fan vote
- ↑ All-Star Game Most Valuable Player

Anaheim Ducks players and coaches selected to the All-Star Game
Game	Year	Name	Position	References
45th	1994	Alexei Kasatonov	Defense	
46th	1996	Paul Kariya	Left wing	
47th	1997	Guy Hebert	Goaltender	
47th	1997	Paul Kariya†	Left wing	
47th	1997	Teemu Selanne	Right wing	
48th	1998	Dmitri Mironov	Defense	
48th	1998	Teemu Selanne†	Right wing	
49th	1999	Paul Kariya†	Left wing	
49th	1999	Teemu Selanne†	Right wing	
50th	2000	Paul Kariya†	Left wing	
50th	2000	Teemu Selanne†	Right wing	
51st	2001	Paul Kariya†	Left wing	
52nd	2002	Paul Kariya	Left wing	
53rd	2003	Paul Kariya	Left wing	
53rd	2003	Sandis Ozolinsh† (Note: Ozolinsh was chosen as a member of the Florida Panthers but was traded to Anaheim two nights before the game. The public address announcement was: "From your Florida Panthers but now playing for the Mighty Ducks of Anaheim, #8 Sandis Ozolinsh!!".)	Defense	
54th	2004	No Ducks selected	—	
55th	2007	Randy Carlyle	Coach	
55th	2007	Andy McDonald	Center	
55th	2007	Scott Niedermayer† (Did not play)	Defense	
55th	2007	Teemu Selanne	Right wing	
56th	2008	Ryan Getzlaf	Center	
56th	2008	Scott Niedermayer	Defense	
56th	2008	Corey Perry	Right wing	
56th	2008	Chris Pronger	Defense	
57th	2009	Ryan Getzlaf†	Center	
57th	2009	Jean-Sebastien Giguere†	Goaltender	
57th	2009	Scott Niedermayer†	Defense	
58th	2011	Jonas Hiller	Goaltender	
58th	2011	Corey Perry	Right wing	
59th	2012	Corey Perry	Right wing	
60th	2015	Ryan Getzlaf	Center	
61st	2016	John Gibson	Goaltender	
61st	2016	Corey Perry	Right wing	
62nd	2017	Cam Fowler	Defense	
62nd	2017	Ryan Kesler	Center	
63rd	2018	Rickard Rakell	Left wing	
64th	2019	John Gibson	Goaltender	
65th	2020	Jakob Silfverberg (Did not play)	Left wing	
66th	2022	John Gibson	Goaltender	
66th	2022	Troy Terry#	Right wing	
67th	2023	Troy Terry	Right wing	
68th	2024	Frank Vatrano	Left wing	

=== All-Star Game replacement events ===
Anaheim Ducks players and coaches selected to All-Star Game replacement events
Event	Year	Name	Position	References
4 Nations Face-Off	2025	Leo Carlsson (Sweden)	Center	

== Career achievements ==
=== Hockey Hall of Fame ===
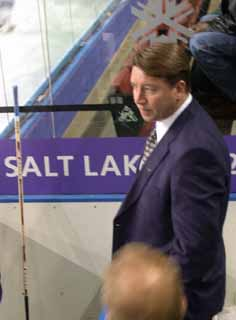
Hockey Hall of Famer Jari Kurri played one season with Anaheim.

The following is a list of Anaheim Ducks who have been enshrined in the Hockey Hall of Fame.

Anaheim Ducks inducted into the Hockey Hall of Fame
Individual	Category	Year inducted	Years with Ducks in category	References
Sergei Fedorov	Player	2015	2003–2005	
Paul Kariya	Player	2017	1995–2003	
Jari Kurri	Player	2001	1996–1997	
Scott Niedermayer	Player	2013	2005–2010	
Adam Oates	Player	2012	2002–2003	
Chris Pronger	Player	2015	2006–2009	
Teemu Selanne	Player	2017	1996–2001, 2005–2014	

=== Lester Patrick Trophy ===
The Lester Patrick Trophy has been presented by the National Hockey League and USA Hockey since 1966 to honor a recipient's contribution to ice hockey in the United States. This list includes all personnel who have ever been employed by the Anaheim Ducks in any capacity and have also received the Lester Patrick Trophy.

Members of the Anaheim Ducks honored with the Lester Patrick Trophy
Individual	Year honored	Years with Ducks	References
Brian Burke	2008	2005–2008	

=== United States Hockey Hall of Fame ===
Members of the Anaheim Ducks inducted into the United States Hockey Hall of Fame
Individual	Year inducted	Years with Ducks	References
Mathieu Schneider	2015	2007–2008	
Doug Weight	2013	2007–2008	
Ron Wilson	2017	1993–1997	
Scott Young	2017	1997–1998	

=== Retired numbers ===
The Anaheim Ducks have retired three of their jersey numbers. Also out of circulation is the number 99 which was retired league-wide for Wayne Gretzky on February 6, 2000. Gretzky did not play for the Ducks during his 20-year NHL career and no Ducks player had ever worn the number 99 prior to its retirement.

Anaheim Ducks retired numbers
Number	Player	Position	Years with Ducks as a player	Date of retirement ceremony	References
8	Teemu Selanne	Right wing	1995–2001, 2005–2014	January 11, 2015	
9	Paul Kariya	Left wing	1995–2003	October 21, 2018	
27	Scott Niedermayer	Defense	2005–2010	February 17, 2019	

== Other awards ==
Anaheim Ducks who have received non-NHL awards
Award	Description	Winner	Season	References
Best NHL Player ESPY Award	Best NHL player of the last calendar year	Jean-Sebastien Giguere	2003	
