= Jean-Sébastien Giguère =

Canadian ice hockey player (born 1977)

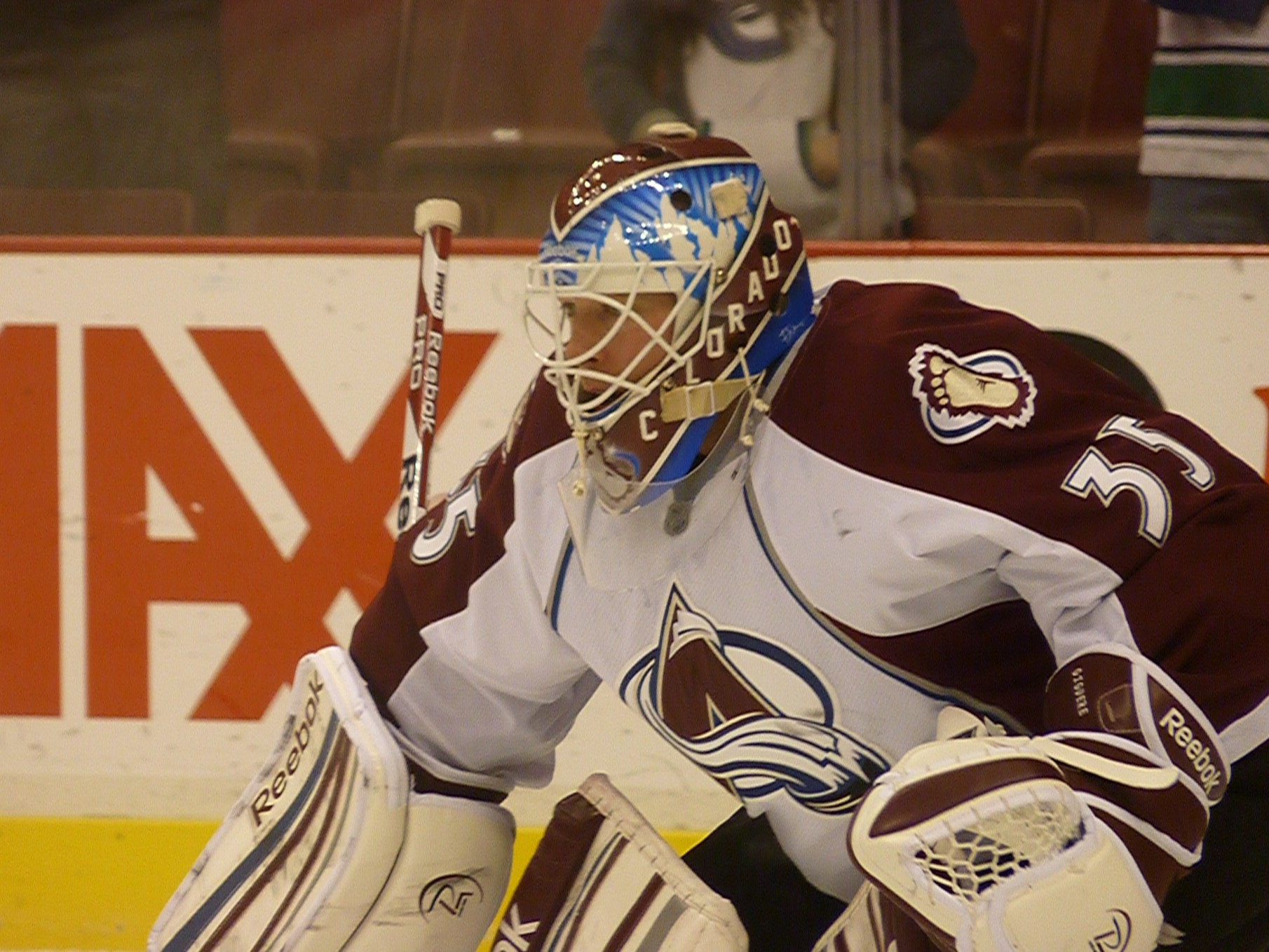
- Giguère with the Colorado Avalanche in 2013
- Born: May 16, 1977 (age 49) Montreal, Quebec, Canada
- Height: 6 ft 1 in (185 cm)
- Weight: 201 lb (91 kg; 14 st 5 lb)
- Position: Goaltender
- Caught: Left
- Played for: Hartford Whalers; Calgary Flames; Anaheim Ducks; Toronto Maple Leafs; Colorado Avalanche
- National team: Canada
- NHL draft: 13th overall, 1995; Hartford Whalers
- Playing career: 1997–2014
Medal record
Representing Canada
World Championships
Gold medal – first place	2004 Czech Republic

Jean-Sébastien Giguère (French pronunciation: [ʒɑ̃ sebastjɛ̃ ʒiɡɛʁ]; born May 16, 1977) is a Canadian former professional ice hockey goaltender. He played with the Halifax Mooseheads in the Quebec Major Junior Hockey League (QMJHL), and was drafted 13th overall by the Hartford Whalers in the 1995 NHL entry draft. He played in the Calgary Flames organization for three seasons before joining the Mighty Ducks of Anaheim in 2000.

In the 2003 NHL playoffs, Giguère anchored the seventh-seeded Mighty Ducks on their run to the Stanley Cup Finals, where he became the fifth player in NHL history to win the Conn Smythe Trophy despite not winning the Stanley Cup in the same season. Giguere ultimately won the Stanley Cup with the Ducks in 2007.

His later career included stints in Toronto and Colorado. Giguère holds the Anaheim Ducks' franchise record for career wins and shutouts and was the last active NHL player who had played for the Hartford Whalers.

== Playing career ==
=== Early career ===
As a youth, Giguère played in the 1990 and 1991 Quebec International Pee-Wee Hockey Tournaments with a minor ice hockey team from the Mille Îles area of Laval, Quebec.

After his four-year major junior career that included QMJHL Second Team All-Star honours in 1997, the Hartford Whalers drafted Giguère 13th overall in the 1995 NHL entry draft with a pick acquired from the New York Rangers in exchange for Pat Verbeek. Giguère made his NHL debut with the Whalers, playing eight games during the 1996–97 season.

On August 25, 1997 (by which time the Whalers had relocated to become the Carolina Hurricanes), Giguère was traded to the Calgary Flames, along with centre Andrew Cassels, for forward Gary Roberts and goaltender Trevor Kidd. Giguère then played the entirety of the 1997–98 season in the American Hockey League (AHL) with Calgary's minor league affiliate, the Saint John Flames. He recorded a 2.46 goals against average (GAA) and a .926 save percentage in 31 games in his professional rookie season with Saint John. Giguère spent a total of four seasons in the Flames organization, making brief 15- and seven-game appearances with Calgary in 1998–99 and 1999–2000, respectively, while spending most of his time in the AHL.

=== Anaheim Ducks (2000–2010) ===
On June 10, 2000, Giguère was traded to the Mighty Ducks of Anaheim in exchange for a second-round pick in 2000 (later traded to the Washington Capitals; the Capitals selected Matt Pettinger). He began the 2000-01 season with the Mighty Ducks' farm team, the Cincinnati Mighty Ducks, until he was recalled from the AHL. Giguère eventually took over Dominic Roussel's backup position to starter Guy Hebert. Due to only brief stints in the NHL during his tenures with Hartford and Calgary, the 2000–01 season qualified as Giguère's rookie NHL season. He played in 34 games, posting a 2.57 GAA and .911 save percentage.

In the off-season, he was re-signed by the Mighty Ducks on August 17, 2001. Giguère continued to improve in 2001–02, his first full season with the Ducks, recording a 2.13 GAA and .920 save percentage in 53 games. In the 2002–03 season, he posted his first winning season with a 34–22–6 record, as well as a career-high eight shutouts.

Giguère's first winning season in the NHL helped the Mighty Ducks enter the 2003 playoffs as the seventh seed in the Western Conference. From that point, Giguere delivered one of the greatest playoff performances in NHL history as he helped lead the team on a Cinderella run to their first Stanley Cup Final. Facing the defending Stanley Cup champions and second-seeded Detroit Red Wings in the opening round, Giguère set an NHL record for most saves by a goaltender in their playoff debut with 63 in the Mighty Ducks' 2–1 triple overtime win in game one, surpassing Toronto Maple Leafs goaltender Jiří Crha's mark by two saves. This record would later be broken by the Vancouver Canucks' Roberto Luongo, who stopped 72 shots in his playoff debut against the Dallas Stars in 2007. The Ducks would proceed to shock the hockey world by sweeping the Red Wings in four games, with Giguère labelled as the star of the series. The Mighty Ducks then faced Dallas. Giguère stopped 60 of 63 Dallas shots in the series opener, a five-overtime Anaheim win. He recorded his first shutout of the playoffs in game four, stopping 28 shots. The Mighty Ducks eventually eliminated the Stars in six games, and moved on to the Western Conference Finals to face the Minnesota Wild. Giguère held the Wild to an all-time, best-of-seven-series low of one goal in the entire series, which included a franchise-record shutout streak of 217 minutes and 54 seconds (later surpassed by Ilya Bryzgalov in 2006).

However, the Mighty Ducks' dream of hoisting the Stanley Cup was stopped by the New Jersey Devils, to whom Anaheim lost in a seven-game series. Giguère finished the playoffs undefeated in seven overtime games, setting a record for the longest playoff overtime shutout streak at 168 minutes and 27 seconds. He finished with a 15–6 record overall, a 1.62 GAA and .945 save percentage, as well as fewer losses than Finals counterpart Martin Brodeur. He was the fifth player to receive the Conn Smythe Trophy as playoff MVP as part of the losing team and the first since Philadelphia Flyers goaltender Ron Hextall won in 1987. Along with the Conn Smythe, he received the 2003 ESPY award for Best Hockey Player. The only other goalie ever to do so is Dominik Hašek.

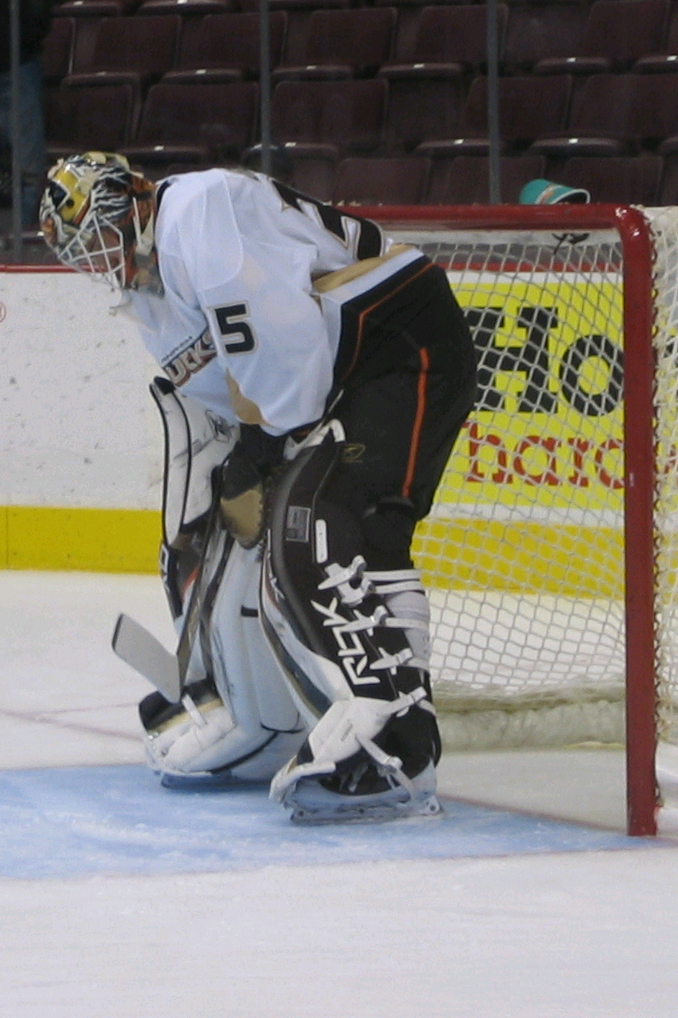
Giguère in action with the Ducks in November 2006

Giguère's playoff MVP performance was rewarded in the off-season with a four-year contract extension, signed on September 10, 2003. However, his performance was inconsistent throughout much of the 2003–04 season as the Mighty Ducks missed the 2004 playoffs. Giguère posted a 17–31–6 record and his GAA increased to 2.62. Due to the 2004–05 NHL lock-out that cancelled the entire 2004–05 NHL season, Giguère went overseas to play for the Hamburg Freezers in Germany.

Giguère returned to an improved Mighty Ducks squad as NHL play resumed in 2005–06. Anaheim returned to the playoffs and made it to the Western Conference Finals, where they were eliminated by the Edmonton Oilers. Giguère, however, appeared in just four games, as Russian rookie backup Ilya Bryzgalov took over the starting position during the post-season. Giguère missed the first game of the opening round against Calgary due to injury, but returned for games two through five. During game five, Giguère was pulled after allowing three goals on eight shots, where Bryzgalov took over and subsequently reeled off three-straight shutouts spanning the first and second rounds against Calgary and the Colorado Avalanche, tying an NHL playoff record and breaking Giguère's 2003 club record of consecutive playoff shutout minutes.

Entering the final season of his contract in 2006–07, Giguère reclaimed the starter's role. In the first month of the season, October 2006, he did not lose a single game in regulation. He proceeded to put up a career-high 36 wins in 56 games. Prior to the beginning of the 2007 playoffs, Giguère and his wife welcomed a newborn son. Giguère missed the Ducks' last three regular season games as well as the first three games of their opening round matchup with Minnesota, with Bryzgalov taking over in Giguère's absence. Giguère returned late in the series and was the Ducks' starter the rest of the way. During the second round against Vancouver, his eight-game overtime winning streak in the playoffs was snapped on April 27, 2007, in a 2–1 defeat in game two. Nevertheless, Giguère and the Ducks went on to eliminate the Canucks en route to the 2007 Stanley Cup Final, where they won their first-ever Stanley Cup championship in a 6–2 game five win over the Ottawa Senators on June 6.

On June 21, 2007, the Ducks announced that they had re-signed Giguère to a multi-year contract. Giguère posted a 35–17–6 record with a career-best 2.12 GAA in the 2007–08 season. Despite his personal numbers, however, the defending champion Ducks were defeated in the first round of the 2008 playoffs by the Dallas Stars in six games.

Giguère recorded sub-par numbers during the 2008–09 season, going 19–18–6 with a 3.10 GAA, sharing an increased amount of playing time to his backup Jonas Hiller. This did not deter him from being voted into the 2009 NHL All-Star Game in his hometown of Montreal. As Hiller outplayed Giguère throughout the season, he was chosen over Giguère to start during the 2009 playoffs. Giguère's only appearance for the Ducks in the playoffs was in relief of Hiller in the third period of game four of the Ducks' second round series with the Detroit Red Wings, to whom the Ducks would eventually fall in seven games.

Giguère suffered a groin strain early in the 2009–10 season on October 24, 2009. With Hiller's continued emergence as a bona fide starter, Giguère publicly told L.A. Daily News on November 10 that he "would rather retire than be a backup goalie," fuelling a goaltending controversy on the team. Losing his starting position to Hiller, he did not record his first win of the season until November 23 in a 3–2 shootout victory over the Calgary Flames.

=== Toronto Maple Leafs (2010–2011) ===
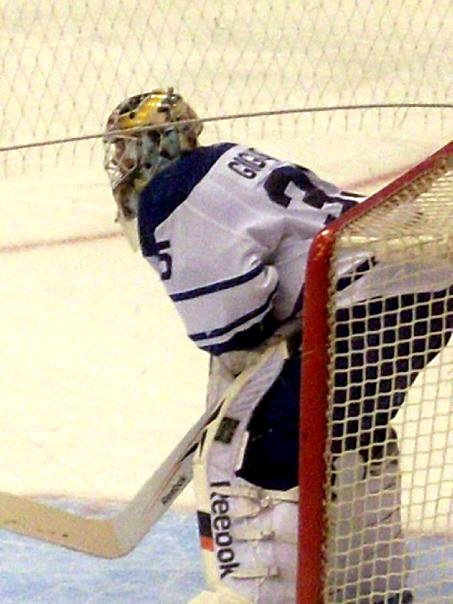
Giguère in 2010 as a member of the Toronto Maple Leafs

Giguère was traded to the Toronto Maple Leafs on January 31, 2010, in exchange for goaltender Vesa Toskala and forward Jason Blake. Three days later, Giguère played his first game for the Maple Leafs and recorded a 30-save shutout against the New Jersey Devils. He registered another shutout in his next game against Ottawa on February 6 to become the first goalie in franchise history to record shutouts in his first two games. This accomplishment led Giguère to be named the NHL's Second Star of the Week on February 8. After having recorded a 3.14 GAA and .900 save percentage in 20 games with the Ducks before being traded, he improved to a 2.49 GAA and .916 save percentage in 15 games with Toronto.

The following season, Giguère suffered a groin injury in mid-November 2010, sidelining him for three weeks. Upon his return, he played in several games before re-injuring his groin. During that time, the Leafs were in need of a goaltender, forcing them to call-up James Reimer from the AHL's Toronto Marlies, who took over the starter's position in Giguère's absence.

=== Colorado Avalanche (2011–2014) ===
On July 1, 2011, free agent Giguère signed a two-year, $2.5 million contract with the Colorado Avalanche. He embraced his role in the Colorado locker room as the veteran mentor, especially for young starting goaltender Semyon Varlamov. Giguère's leadership was key in a four-game home stand in mid-December when Varlamov was sidelined with a back ailment; Giguère started all four games and won them all, securing the Avalanche a team-record, eight-straight wins at home. It was the most consecutive home wins the franchise had seen since the Quebec Nordiques won ten-straight in 1995 before the club moved to Denver later that year to become the Avalanche. Giguère was named one of the three NHL's three stars of the week for late December. A groin pull on February 15, 2012, during a losing effort to the Vancouver Canucks, however, sidelined Giguère, allowing Varlamov the opportunity to redeem himself and reclaim the starting position in net for the remainder of the race to the 2012 playoffs, which Colorado ultimately did not qualify for. On August 13, 2012, Giguère signed a one-year, US$1.5 million contract extension through the 2013–14 season.

== Post-playing career ==
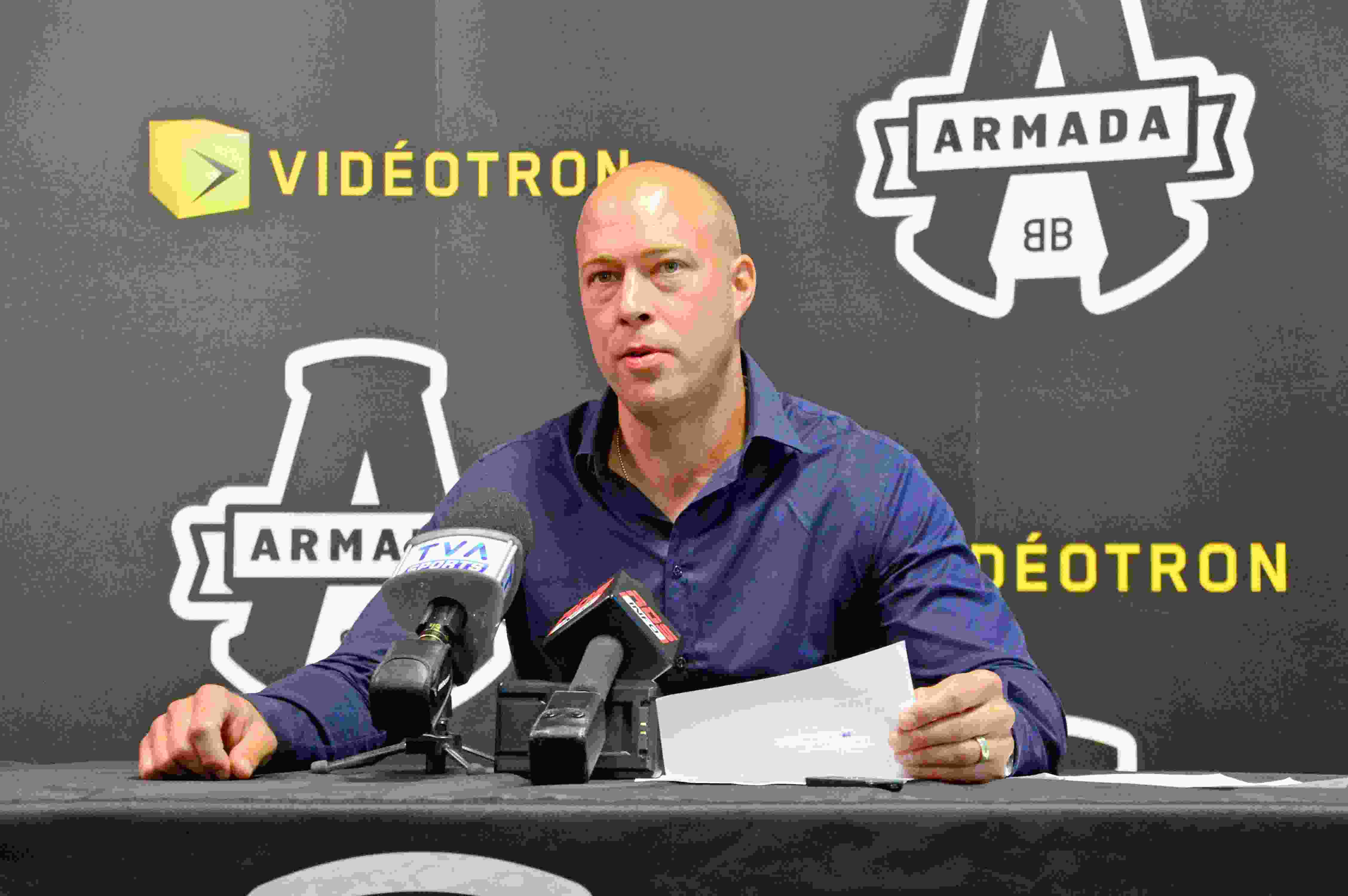
Giguère announces his retirement in Blainville, Quebec, in August 2014.

On May 26, 2014, reports surfaced that Giguère was prepared to retire, and had likely played in his final NHL game, amidst much speculation. In what proved to be his final NHL start, Colorado's regular season finale in Anaheim, he received a video tribute and warm ovation from the crowd. At the end of the game, Giguère shared a victory lap with former teammate Teemu Selänne, who had already confirmed his own retirement and was playing in his final regular season game. On August 21, Giguère formally announced his retirement. He was the last active NHL player to have played for the Hartford Whalers.

== Personal life ==
Giguère was born in Montreal, Quebec, but grew up in Blainville, Quebec. Giguère's father died of cancer on December 15, 2008, and this greatly affected his performance for the rest of the season. Giguère went into the All-Star Game that year with a very weak record, with only one win in his last nine games. Giguère's mother died February 2013.

Giguère suffers from aerophagia, a rare gastric condition that causes his body to take in too much air when he drinks fluids. As a result, his body has difficulty absorbing water, leading to severe dehydration when he sweats.

== Career statistics ==
=== Regular season and playoffs ===
			Regular season										Playoffs
Season	Team	League	GP	W	L	T	OTL	MIN	GA	SO	GAA	SV%	GP	W	L	MIN	GA	SO	GAA	SV%
1992–93	Laval-Laurentides	QMAAA	27	12	11	2	—	1498	76	0	3.04	—	12	6	5	654	38	0	3.49	—
1993–94	Verdun Collège Français	QMJHL	26	13	7	2	—	1288	69	1	3.21	.878	1	0	0	29	2	0	4.14	.889
1994–95	Halifax Mooseheads	QMJHL	47	14	27	5	—	2755	181	2	3.94	.889	7	3	4	417	17	1	2.45	.934
1995–96	Halifax Mooseheads	QMJHL	55	26	23	2	—	3230	185	1	3.44	.894	6	1	5	354	24	0	4.07	.874
1996–97	Hartford Whalers	NHL	8	1	4	0	—	394	24	0	3.65	.881	—	—	—	—	—	—	—	—
1996–97	Halifax Mooseheads	QMJHL	50	28	19	3	—	3014	170	2	3.38	.902	16	9	7	954	58	0	3.65	.899
1997–98	Saint John Flames	AHL	31	16	10	3	—	1758	72	2	2.46	.926	10	5	3	536	27	0	3.02	.897
1998–99	Calgary Flames	NHL	15	6	7	1	—	860	46	0	3.21	.897	—	—	—	—	—	—	—	—
1998–99	Saint John Flames	AHL	39	18	16	3	—	2145	123	3	3.44	.905	7	3	2	304	21	0	4.14	.859
1999–2000	Calgary Flames	NHL	7	1	3	1	—	330	15	0	2.73	.914	—	—	—	—	—	—	—	—
1999–2000	Saint John Flames	AHL	41	17	17	3	—	2243	114	0	3.05	.897	3	0	3	178	9	0	3.03	.880
2000–01	Mighty Ducks of Anaheim	NHL	34	11	17	5	—	2031	87	4	2.57	.911	—	—	—	—	—	—	—	—
2000–01	Cincinnati Mighty Ducks	AHL	23	12	7	2	—	1306	53	0	2.43	.917	—	—	—	—	—	—	—	—
2001–02	Mighty Ducks of Anaheim	NHL	53	20	25	6	—	3127	111	4	2.13	.920	—	—	—	—	—	—	—	—
2002–03	Mighty Ducks of Anaheim	NHL	65	34	22	6	—	3775	145	8	2.30	.920	21	15	6	1407	38	5	1.62	.945
2003–04	Mighty Ducks of Anaheim	NHL	55	17	31	6	—	3210	140	3	2.62	.914	—	—	—	—	—	—	—	—
2004–05	Hamburg Freezers	DEL	6	—	—	—	—	301	12	0	2.39	.925	2	0	2	100	7	0	4.20	.881
2005–06	Mighty Ducks of Anaheim	NHL	60	30	15	—	11	3381	150	2	2.66	.911	6	3	3	318	18	0	3.40	.864
2006–07	Anaheim Ducks	NHL	56	36	10	—	8	3245	122	4	2.26	.918	18	13	4	1067	35	1	1.97	.922
2007–08	Anaheim Ducks	NHL	58	35	17	—	6	3310	117	4	2.12	.922	6	2	4	358	19	0	3.18	.898
2008–09	Anaheim Ducks	NHL	46	19	18	—	6	2458	127	2	3.10	.900	1	0	0	17	0	0	0.00	1.000
2009–10	Anaheim Ducks	NHL	20	4	8	—	5	1108	58	1	3.14	.900	—	—	—	—	—	—	—	—
2009–10	Toronto Maple Leafs	NHL	15	6	7	—	2	915	38	2	2.49	.916	—	—	—	—	—	—	—	—
2010–11	Toronto Maple Leafs	NHL	33	11	11	—	4	1633	78	0	2.87	.900	—	—	—	—	—	—	—	—
2011–12	Colorado Avalanche	NHL	32	15	11	—	3	1820	69	2	2.27	.919	—	—	—	—	—	—	—	—
2012–13	Colorado Avalanche	NHL	18	5	4	—	4	908	43	0	2.84	.908	—	—	—	—	—	—	—	—
2013–14	Colorado Avalanche	NHL	22	11	6	—	1	1212	53	2	2.62	.913	—	—	—	—	—	—	—	—
NHL totals			597	262	216	25	50	33,717	1423	38	2.53	.913	52	33	17	3167	110	6	2.08	.925

=== International ===
Year	Team	Event	Result	GP	W	L	T	MIN	GA	SO	GAA	SV%
2001	Canada	WC	DNP	5th	—	—	—	—	—	—	—	—
2002	Canada	WC	6th	5	3	1	0	254	8	0	1.89	.921
2004	Canada	WC	1st place, gold medalist(s)	2	2	0	0	120	1	1	0.50	.975
Senior totals				7	5	1	0	374	9	1	1.44	—

== Awards and honours ==
Award	Year	Ref
QMJHL
Second All-Star Team	1997	
AHL
Hap Holmes Memorial Award	1998	
NHL
Conn Smythe Trophy	2003	
Best NHL Player ESPY Award	2003	
Stanley Cup champion	2007	
NHL All-Star Game	2009	

== Transactions ==
- July 8, 1995 – Drafted by the Hartford Whalers in the first round, 13th overall
- June 25, 1997 – Rights transferred to the Carolina Hurricanes when the Hartford Whalers relocated
- August 27, 1997 – Traded to the Calgary Flames with Andrew Cassels in exchange for Gary Roberts and Trevor Kidd
- June 10, 2000 – Traded to the Mighty Ducks of Anaheim for a second-round pick in 2000 (Matt Pettinger)
- June 21, 2007 – Signed a four-year, $24 million contract with Anaheim
- January 31, 2010 – Traded to the Toronto Maple Leafs in exchange for Vesa Toskala and Jason Blake
- July 1, 2011 – Signed a two-year, $2.5 million contract with the Colorado Avalanche
- August 13, 2012 – Signed a one-year, $1.5 million contract extension with Colorado

Awards and achievements
Preceded by Jeff O'Neill	Hartford Whalers first-round draft pick 1995	Succeeded by Nikos Tselios
Preceded by Nicklas Lidstrom	Conn Smythe Trophy winner 2003	Succeeded by Brad Richards
