= John Gibson (ice hockey, born 1993) =

American ice hockey player (born 1993)

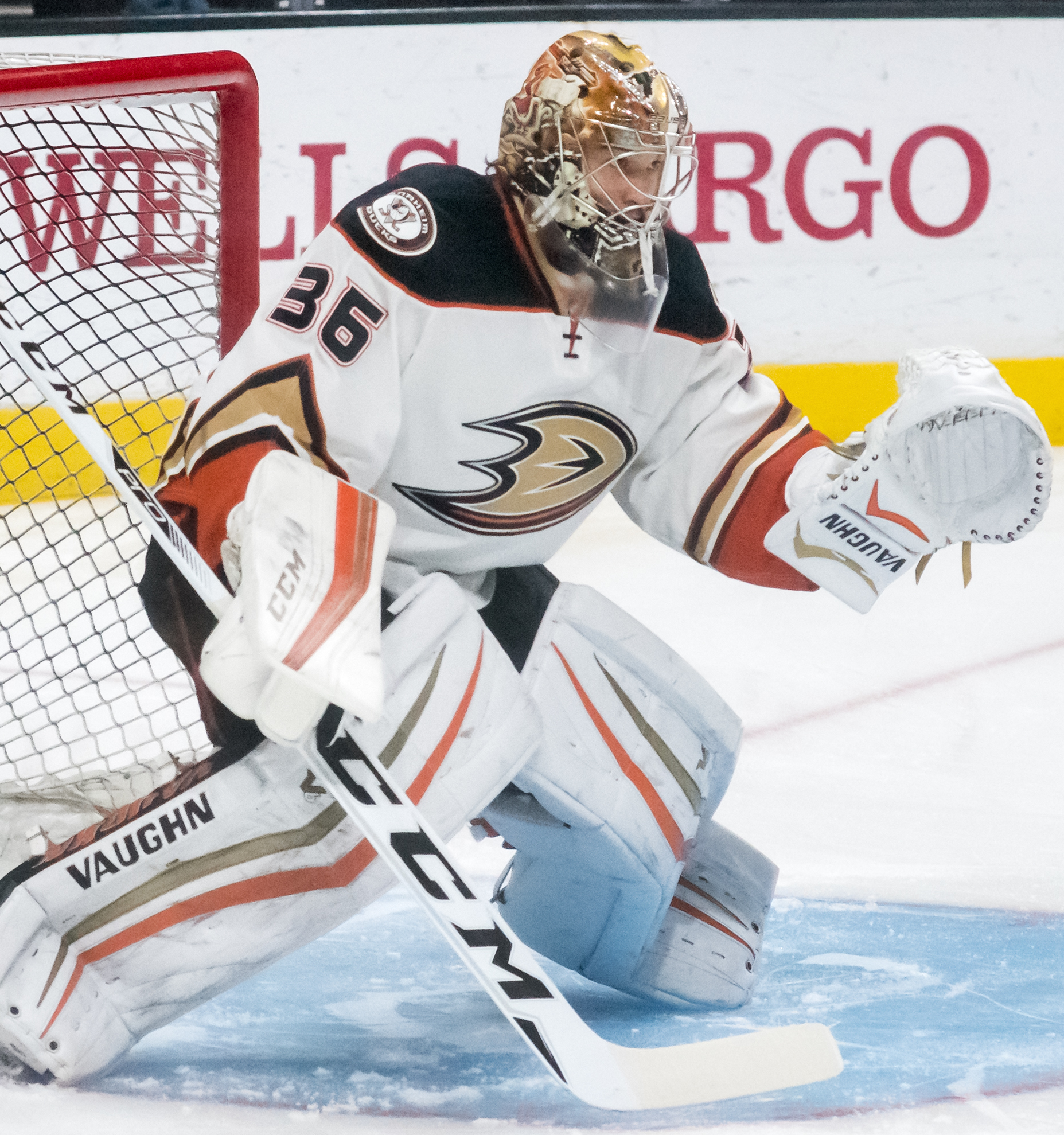
- Gibson with the Anaheim Ducks in 2016
- Born: July 14, 1993 (age 33) Pittsburgh, Pennsylvania, U.S.
- Height: 6 ft 3 in (191 cm)
- Weight: 226 lb (103 kg; 16 st 2 lb)
- Position: Goaltender
- Catches: Left
- NHL team Former teams: Detroit Red Wings; Anaheim Ducks
- National team: United States
- NHL draft: 39th overall, 2011; Anaheim Ducks
- Playing career: 2013–present

John Gibson (born July 14, 1993) is an American professional ice hockey player who is a goaltender for the Detroit Red Wings of the National Hockey League (NHL).

== Playing career ==
=== Amateur ===
On June 24, 2011, Gibson was drafted in the second round, 39th overall, at the 2011 NHL entry draft by the Anaheim Ducks. Prior to his selection, while still playing with USA Hockey's National Team Development Program, he committed himself to playing college ice hockey at the University of Michigan, for the upcoming 2011–12 season. However, on July 27, he opted out of his agreement with Michigan to instead play major junior ice hockey for the Kitchener Rangers of the Ontario Hockey League (OHL). Gibson, who attended Baldwin High School in Pittsburgh, Pennsylvania, was cut from their hockey team and still went on to make the NHL.

During the following season, 2012–13, Gibson was selected to represent the United States at the 2013 World Junior Ice Hockey Championships. He was the team's primary goaltender throughout the championship, registering a .955 save percentage and a 1.36 goals against average (GAA) in seven games for the eventual gold medal winners. His save percentage led all goaltenders in the tournament and he was named as the tournament's best goaltender. He was also named to the tournament All-Star Team, as well as named the tournament's most valuable player.

Gibson also won a bronze medal at the 2013 IIHF World Championships with Team USA's senior squad, posting a 1.56 GAA and .951 save percentage in the tournament.

=== Professional ===
==== Anaheim Ducks ====
Gibson made his professional debut with the Norfolk Admirals, the American Hockey League (AHL) affiliate of the Anaheim Ducks, on April 19, 2013, playing 40 minutes in relief.

On April 7, 2014, aged 20 years and 297 days, Gibson made his first NHL start for the Ducks following an injury to goaltender Frederik Andersen. Making 18 saves for a shutout, Gibson earned his first NHL win, a 3–0 victory over the Vancouver Canucks. In doing so, Gibson became the youngest NHL goaltender to record a shutout in his NHL debut since the Buffalo Sabres' Daren Puppa (20 years, 223 days) performed the feat in the 1985–86 season. Gibson made his Stanley Cup playoff debut with the Ducks in Game 4 of the Western Conference Semifinal against the Los Angeles Kings. He registered a shutout on 28 shots and was named first star of the game on May 10, 2014. Jonas Hiller, whom Gibson started over, was the last goaltender prior to Gibson to record a shutout in his Stanley Cup playoff debut. The Ducks would win Game 5 at home 4–3 but would lose Games 6 and 7 by scores of 2–1 and 6–2, respectively, with Gibson being pulled in Game 7 after allowing 4 goals on 18 shots.

With the departure of Jonas Hiller via free agency, the Ducks announced that both Frederik Andersen and John Gibson would compete for the number one starting job for the 2014–15 NHL season. Gibson seemed to have performed well enough in the preseason to start opening night against the Pittsburgh Penguins, his hometown team, in which Gibson stopped 33 of 39 shots en route to a 6–4 loss. With Andersen starting off the season strong, Gibson was sent to Norfolk for a weekend to gain some playing time. Afterwards, he was recalled by the Ducks. Upon his return Gibson won his next two starts and lost one, which included a shutout of the Chicago Blackhawks. Gibson then injured his groin while warming up before a game against the Colorado Avalanche. He was estimated to miss six to eight weeks, thus giving Andersen total control of the number one job and the Ducks signed Ilya Bryzgalov as a backup to Andersen in Gibson's absence. After coming off injured reserve, Gibson spent time off with Norfolk. When Andersen went down with an injury, Gibson was recalled. When Andersen returned, the two goalies would rotate in and out of the crease with Gibson at one point being considered as the starter down the stretch with Andersen struggling a bit. Overall, Gibson would post up a record of 13–8 with a 2.60 goals against average and a save percentage of .914%. He did not see a single minute of play during the Ducks postseason run, missing the entire first round due to an upper-body injury. The Ducks went all the way to the Western Conference Finals but fell to the eventual Stanley Cup champion Chicago Blackhawks in seven games.

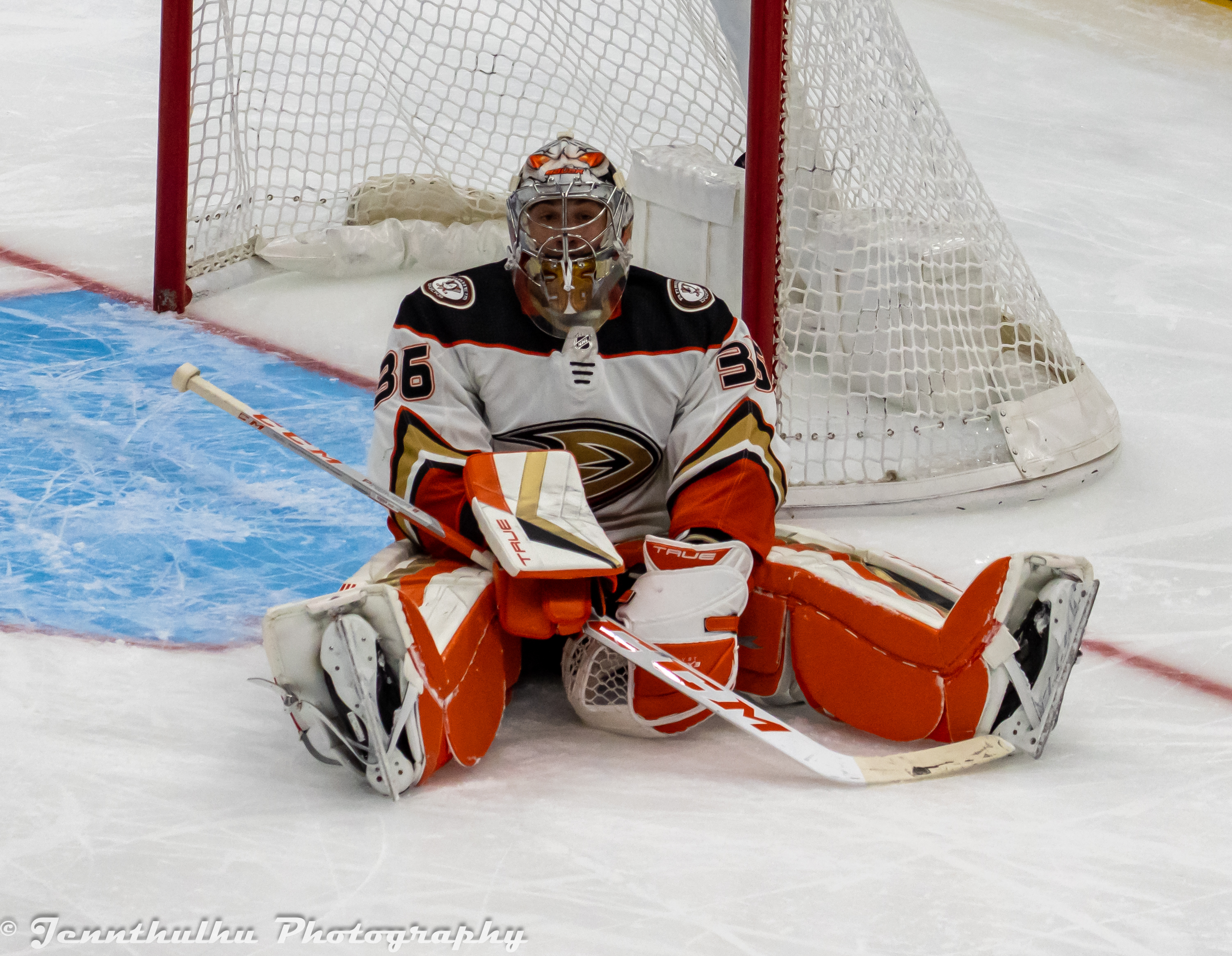
Gibson during a game against the Seattle Kraken in 2023

With the off-season acquisition of Anton Khudobin, rumors sparked of Gibson being traded elsewhere, which was promptly put down by Ducks general manager Bob Murray. On September 21, the Ducks announced that they signed Gibson to a three-year contract extension, worth reportedly $6.9 million. He also began the 2015–16 season with the new AHL affiliate, the San Diego Gulls. When Andersen had the flu, Gibson was recalled on November 24 and started when the Calgary Flames met the Ducks in which the Ducks won 5–3. Gibson started for the next nine games posting a 4–4–1 record. He was named the NHL's Rookie of the Month in December 2016. On January 6, 2016, it was announced that Gibson was selected to his first All-Star Game. Gibson started the first round playoff series with the Nashville Predators, but lost the first two games. Andersen replaced him, but it was not enough and Anaheim was eliminated. Andersen and Gibson combined to win the 2016 William M. Jennings Trophy for the lowest goals scored against. Gibson was also named to the NHL's 2016 All-Rookie Team. However, that offseason, the Ducks traded Andersen to the Toronto Maple Leafs and made Gibson the undisputed starter. The Ducks made the playoffs at the end of the 2016–17 season, however, they were defeated by the Nashville Predators in six games in the Conference Final.

On August 4, 2018, the Ducks re-signed Gibson to an eight-year, $51.2 million contract extension worth $6.4 million annually. He made his second All-Star appearance at the 2019 NHL All-Star Game. Gibson appeared in 46 games (45 starts) going 17–19–8 before being injured in a collision with teammate Jaycob Megna during a 4–0 loss to the Ottawa Senators on February 7, 2019. On February 13, 2019, Gibson was placed on injured reserve by the Ducks, due to head, back, and neck injuries obtained from a collision Megna. He returned to the lineup on March 1 in a 3–0 loss to the Vegas Golden Knights, making 32 saves on 34 shots. The 2019–20 season marked Gibson's fifth straight 20-win season. During the 2020–21 season marked a downturn in Gibson's performance for the first time, with only a .904 save percentage and a 3.00 goals against average.

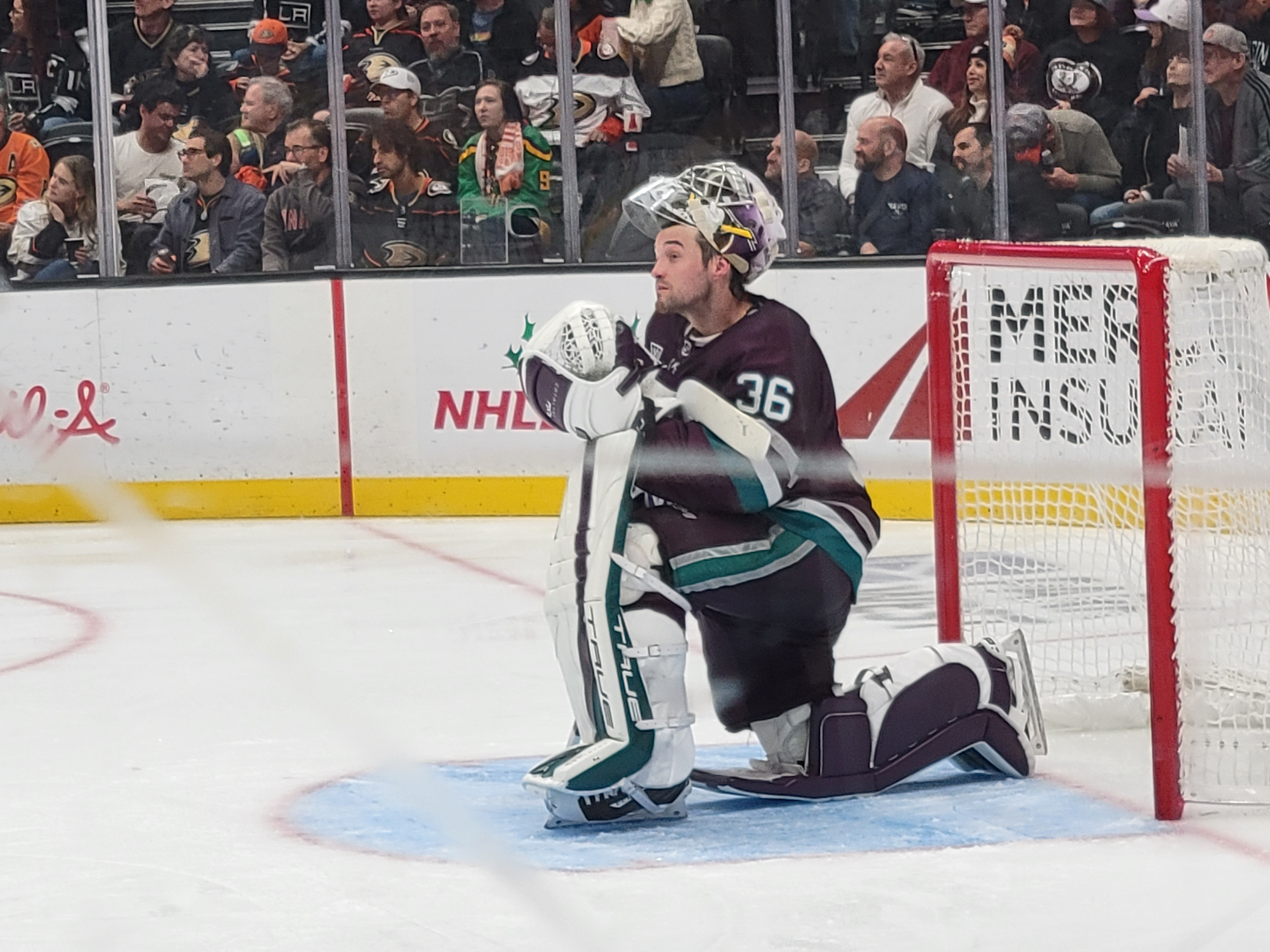
Gibson with the Ducks in November 2023.

John Gibson in net for the Detroit Red Wings in November 2026

Gibson began the 2021–22 season as the team's starter, backed up by Anthony Stolarz and Lukáš Dostál. He began the season demanding a turnaround in the team's play. He was named to the 2022 NHL All-Star Game representing the Ducks for the third time. The Ducks were in the playoff race until the All-Star Game, which they followed up with a losing skid and never got back in. They ended up missing the playoffs. This was reflected in Gibson's play, which saw him struggle following the All-Star Game. During the 2022–23 season, Gibson again played on a struggling Ducks team, leading or among the leaders in saves during the majority of the season. On March 10, 2023, Gibson set a new franchise record for career saves with the team, surpassing Guy Hebert's mark of 11,813 in a 3–1 victory over the Calgary Flames. The Ducks failed to make the postseason for the fifth straight year.

==== Detroit Red Wings ====
On June 28, 2025, at the 2025 NHL entry draft, Gibson's 12-year tenure with the Ducks came to an end when he was traded to the Detroit Red Wings in exchange for fellow goaltender Petr Mrázek and two draft picks.

== International play ==
Medal record

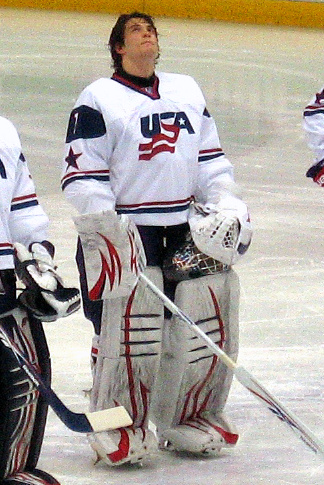
Representing United States

Men's ice hockey

World Championships
Bronze medal – third place	2013 Stockholm/Helsinki	

World Junior Championships
Gold medal – first place	2013 Ufa	

IIHF World U18 Championships
Gold medal – first place	2011 Germany	

Gibson represented Team North America at the 2016 World Cup of Hockey.

== Career statistics ==
=== Regular season and playoffs ===
			Regular season									Playoffs
Season	Team	League	GP	W	L	T/OT	MIN	GA	SO	GAA	SV%	GP	W	L	MIN	GA	SO	GAA	SV%
2009–10	US NTDP	USHL	18	7	9	0	1023	63	0	3.69	.905	—	—	—	—	—	—	—	—
2010–11	US NTDP	USHL	17	9	4	3	983	39	1	2.38	.926	—	—	—	—	—	—	—	—
2011–12	Kitchener Rangers	OHL	32	21	10	0	1897	87	1	2.75	.928	16	8	7	898	40	1	2.67	.938
2012–13	Kitchener Rangers	OHL	27	17	9	1	1615	65	1	2.41	.928	10	5	5	609	22	1	2.17	.946
2012–13	Norfolk Admirals	AHL	1	0	0	0	40	3	0	4.50	.857	—	—	—	—	—	—	—	—
2013–14	Norfolk Admirals	AHL	45	21	17	4	2587	101	5	2.34	.919	6	4	2	373	9	1	1.45	.955
2013–14	Anaheim Ducks	NHL	3	3	0	0	181	4	1	1.33	.954	4	2	2	200	9	1	2.69	.919
2014–15	Anaheim Ducks	NHL	23	13	8	0	1340	58	1	2.60	.914	—	—	—	—	—	—	—	—
2014–15	Norfolk Admirals	AHL	11	6	3	2	665	23	1	2.07	.935	—	—	—	—	—	—	—	—
2015–16	San Diego Gulls	AHL	13	7	4	1	775	34	1	2.63	.917	—	—	—	—	—	—	—	—
2015–16	Anaheim Ducks	NHL	40	21	13	3	2276	79	4	2.07	.920	2	0	2	117	6	0	3.08	.900
2016–17	Anaheim Ducks	NHL	52	25	16	9	2951	109	6	2.22	.924	16	9	5	879	38	0	2.59	.918
2017–18	Anaheim Ducks	NHL	60	31	18	7	3429	139	4	2.43	.926	4	0	4	217	13	0	3.59	.889
2018–19	Anaheim Ducks	NHL	58	26	22	8	3234	153	2	2.84	.917	—	—	—	—	—	—	—	—
2019–20	Anaheim Ducks	NHL	51	20	26	5	2982	149	1	3.00	.904	—	—	—	—	—	—	—	—
2020–21	Anaheim Ducks	NHL	35	9	19	7	2031	101	3	2.98	.903	—	—	—	—	—	—	—	—
2021–22	Anaheim Ducks	NHL	56	18	26	11	3236	172	1	3.19	.904	—	—	—	—	—	—	—	—
2022–23	Anaheim Ducks	NHL	53	14	31	8	3005	200	1	3.99	.899	—	—	—	—	—	—	—	—
2023–24	Anaheim Ducks	NHL	46	13	27	2	2561	151	0	3.54	.888	—	—	—	—	—	—	—	—
2024–25	Anaheim Ducks	NHL	29	11	11	2	1562	71	0	2.73	.912	—	—	—	—	—	—	—	—
2025–26	Detroit Red Wings	NHL	57	29	22	4	3181	144	4	2.72	.901	—	—	—	—	—	—	—	—
NHL totals			563	233	239	67	31,985	1,530	28	2.87	.909	26	11	13	1,413	66	1	2.80	.912

=== International ===
Year	Team	Event	Result	GP	W	L	T/OTL	MIN	GA	SO	GAA	SV%
2012	United States	WJC	7th	1	0	1	0	60	4	0	4.00	.852
2013	United States	WJC	1st place, gold medalist(s)	7	5	2	0	398	9	1	1.36	.955
2013	United States	WC	3rd place, bronze medalist(s)	5	3	1	0	308	8	1	1.56	.951
2016	Team North America	WCH	5th	2	1	0	0	86	3	0	2.09	.932
Junior totals				8	5	3	0	458	13	1	1.70	.943
Senior totals				7	4	1	0	394	11	1	1.56	.951

== Awards and honors ==
Award	Year
NHL
Rookie of the Month	December 2015
NHL All-Star Game	2016, 2019, 2022
All-Rookie Team	2016
William M. Jennings Trophy	2016
International
WJC18 First Team All-Star	2011
Dave Peterson Goalie of the Year	2011
WJC Most Valuable Player	2013
WJC Best Goaltender	2013
WJC All-Star Team	2013

Awards and achievements
Preceded by Corey Crawford; Carey Price	William M. Jennings Trophy; 2016; With: Frederik Andersen	Succeeded by Braden Holtby
