= Anthony Stolarz =

American ice hockey player (born 1994)

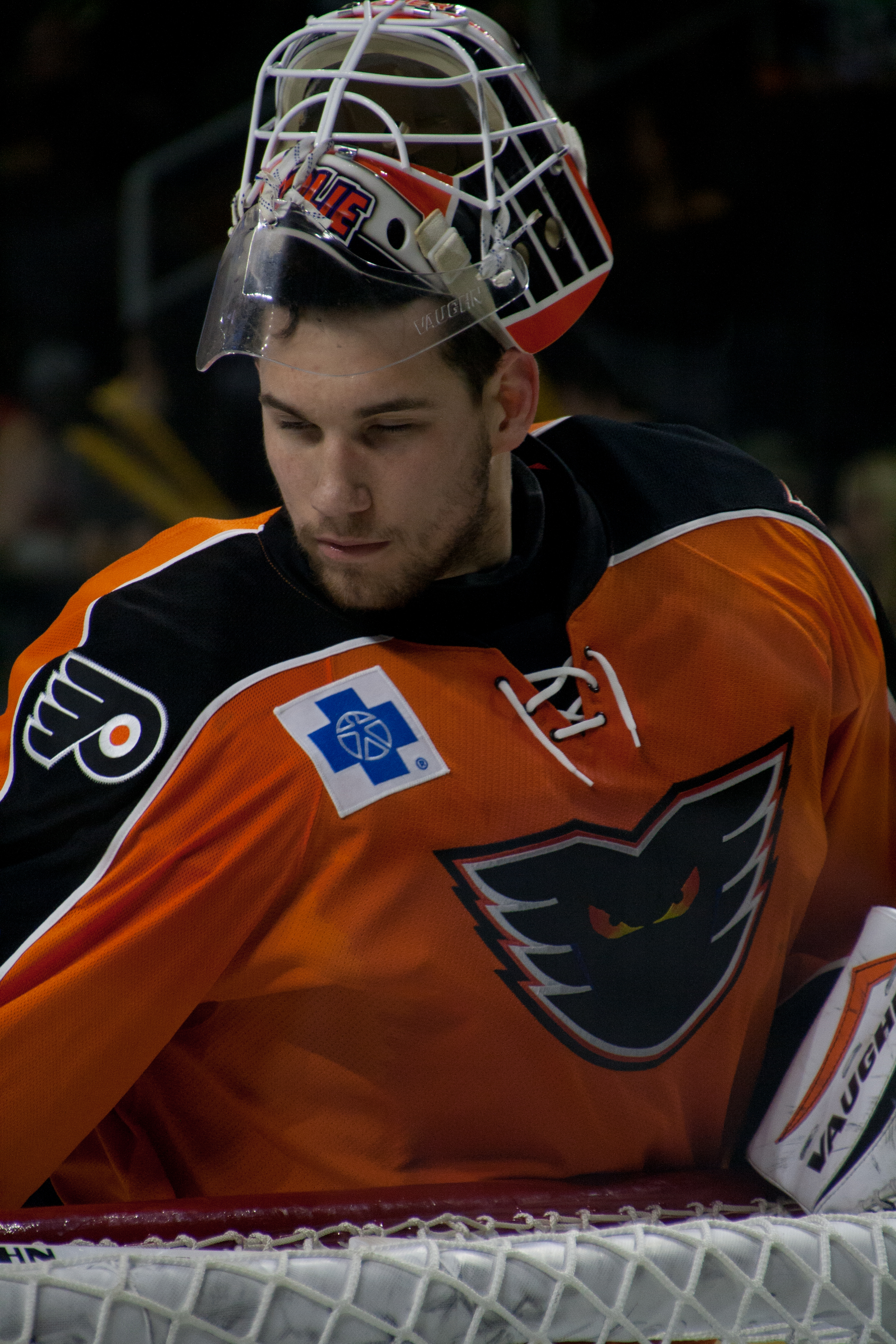
- Stolarz with the Lehigh Valley Phantoms in 2015
- Born: January 20, 1994 (age 32) Edison, New Jersey, U.S.
- Height: 6 ft 6 in (198 cm)
- Weight: 243 lb (110 kg; 17 st 5 lb)
- Position: Goaltender
- Catches: Left
- NHL team Former teams: Toronto Maple Leafs; Philadelphia Flyers; Edmonton Oilers; Anaheim Ducks; Florida Panthers
- National team: United States
- NHL draft: 45th overall, 2012; Philadelphia Flyers
- Playing career: 2014–present

Anthony Stolarz (born January 20, 1994) is an American professional ice hockey player who is a goaltender for the Toronto Maple Leafs of the National Hockey League (NHL). Nicknamed Stolie, Stolarz previously played for the Philadelphia Flyers, Edmonton Oilers, Anaheim Ducks and Florida Panthers. He won the Stanley Cup in 2024 with the Panthers.

Born in Edison, New Jersey, and raised in Jackson Township, Stolarz and his brother Todd played junior ice hockey within the New Jersey Devils organization. After playing two seasons with Jackson Memorial High School and one season with the New Jersey Hitmen of the Empire Junior Hockey League, Stolarz moved to Corpus Christi, Texas to play with the Corpus Christi IceRays of the North American Hockey League. He attended the University of Nebraska Omaha on a scholarship, but dropped out after only eight games with the Omaha Mavericks men's ice hockey team, instead signing with the London Knights of the Ontario Hockey League.

The Flyers drafted Stolarz in the second round, 45th overall, of the 2012 NHL entry draft. He spent two seasons playing with the Lehigh Valley Phantoms, the Flyers' American Hockey League (AHL) affiliate, before making his major league debut in 2016, becoming the first goaltender from New Jersey to play in the NHL. He continued to spend time with the Phantoms and Flyers before being traded to the Oilers in 2019 in exchange for goaltender Cam Talbot. Stolarz became a free agent at the end of the 2018—19 season and signed a two-year contract with the Ducks. He spent most of the 2019–20 season with the Ducks' AHL affiliate, the San Diego Gulls, and only played one game with the Ducks before the NHL season was suspended due to the COVID-19 pandemic. Stolarz returned to the Ducks in the 2020–21 season, and won his first NHL game in over two years on March 28, 2021.

== Early life ==
Stolarz was born on January 20, 1994, in Edison, New Jersey, and was raised in Jackson. A New Jersey Devils fan, Stolarz grew up watching goaltender Martin Brodeur play ice hockey, as well as his older brother Todd, who served in goal for a New Jersey junior ice hockey team. The Stolarz brothers bonded as children by watching old videos of Brodeur and Ron Hextall on the family television set, with Anthony asking questions about the goaltenders. Always tall for his age, Stolarz began goaltending in butterfly style from the age of eight or nine to account for his height.

As a goaltender for New Jersey youth hockey teams, Stolarz played tournaments in Wildwood and Vineland. In 2007, he made an appearance in the Quebec International Pee-Wee Hockey Tournament with the Devils' minor hockey affiliate; and in 2009, he played for the Devils' under-16 youth national hockey team. After spending his freshman year at St. John Vianney High School, Stolarz transferred to Jackson Memorial, where he spent two years playing hockey and basketball before moving to Corpus Christi, Texas. During his junior and senior year of high school, Stolarz experienced a growth spurt that took him from 6 ft 2 in (1.88 m) to 6 ft 5 in (1.96 m).

== Playing career ==
=== Amateur ===
During the 2010–11 season, Stolarz played with the New Jersey Hitmen of the Empire Junior Hockey League (EmJHL). In 16 appearances with the Hitmen, Stolarz posted a 10–4–0 record with a 3.19 goals against average (GAA) and a .902 save percentage (SV%). In 2011, Stolarz wished to serve as the goaltender for the Hitmen's first-level team, a position that had already been given to Chris Funkey. He passed on a chance to serve on the second-level team, instead going to Albany, New York, to try out for the Corpus Christi IceRays of the North American Hockey League (NAHL). Stolarz had a strong season with the IceRays in 2011–12, posting a 23–22–4–3 record, 2.84 GAA, and .920 SV% in 50 appearances with the club, including three shutouts.

Going into the 2012 NHL entry draft, the NHL Central Scouting Bureau ranked Stolarz fourth among all North American goaltending draft prospects, and he was the only NAHL player invited to the 2012 NHL Draft Combine. The Philadelphia Flyers selected Stolarz in the second round, 45th overall, of the 2012 draft. That same year, Stolarz accepted a scholarship to play college hockey at the University of Nebraska Omaha.

Although Stolarz enjoyed most aspects of his time with the Omaha Mavericks, he was frustrated about splitting his time in goal with starting goaltender John Faulkner and backup Dayn Belfour, the son of former NHL player Ed Belfour. After playing only eight games for Omaha, Stolarz dropped out, accepting an offer from the London Knights of the Ontario Hockey League (OHL). At the behest of his parents, Stolarz agreed to attend the University of Western Ontario. His tuition would be taken care of by the Knights, who pay for the college education of all of their full-time players. By the end of the 2012–13 OHL season, Stolarz had become the Knights' starting goaltender. He went 13–3–2 in the final 20 games of the season, with a .920 SV% and 2.29 GAA. After posting a 13–5 record, 2.53 GAA, and .923 SV% in the first rounds of the 2013 OHL playoffs, Stolarz was benched during the championship series against the Barrie Colts due to a subpar performance.

Stolarz returned to the Knights for the 2013–14 OHL season. On January 17, 2014, Stolarz was cut by a skate during a game against the Saginaw Spirit. He was taken out of the game on a stretcher only 3 minutes and 42 seconds into gameplay. The January 17 game was Stolarz' 50th regular season appearance with the Knights, and at the time of his injury, he had a career 34–7–4 record with a 2.46 GAA, .923 SV%, and four shutouts. Stolarz underwent surgery for the cut, a procedure which required 55 stitches and required him to miss 17 games. Shortly after his return, Stolarz received an eight-game suspension on March 26, after slashing Windsor Spitfire forward Josh Ho-Sang in the back of the head. Although he missed most of the playoffs, the OHL waived the final two games of Stolarz' suspension, allowing him to play in the 2014 Memorial Cup. In his two seasons and 55 games with the Knights, Stolarz posted a 38–8–4 record, a 2.43 GAA, and a 0.924 SV%.

=== Professional ===
==== Philadelphia Flyers ====
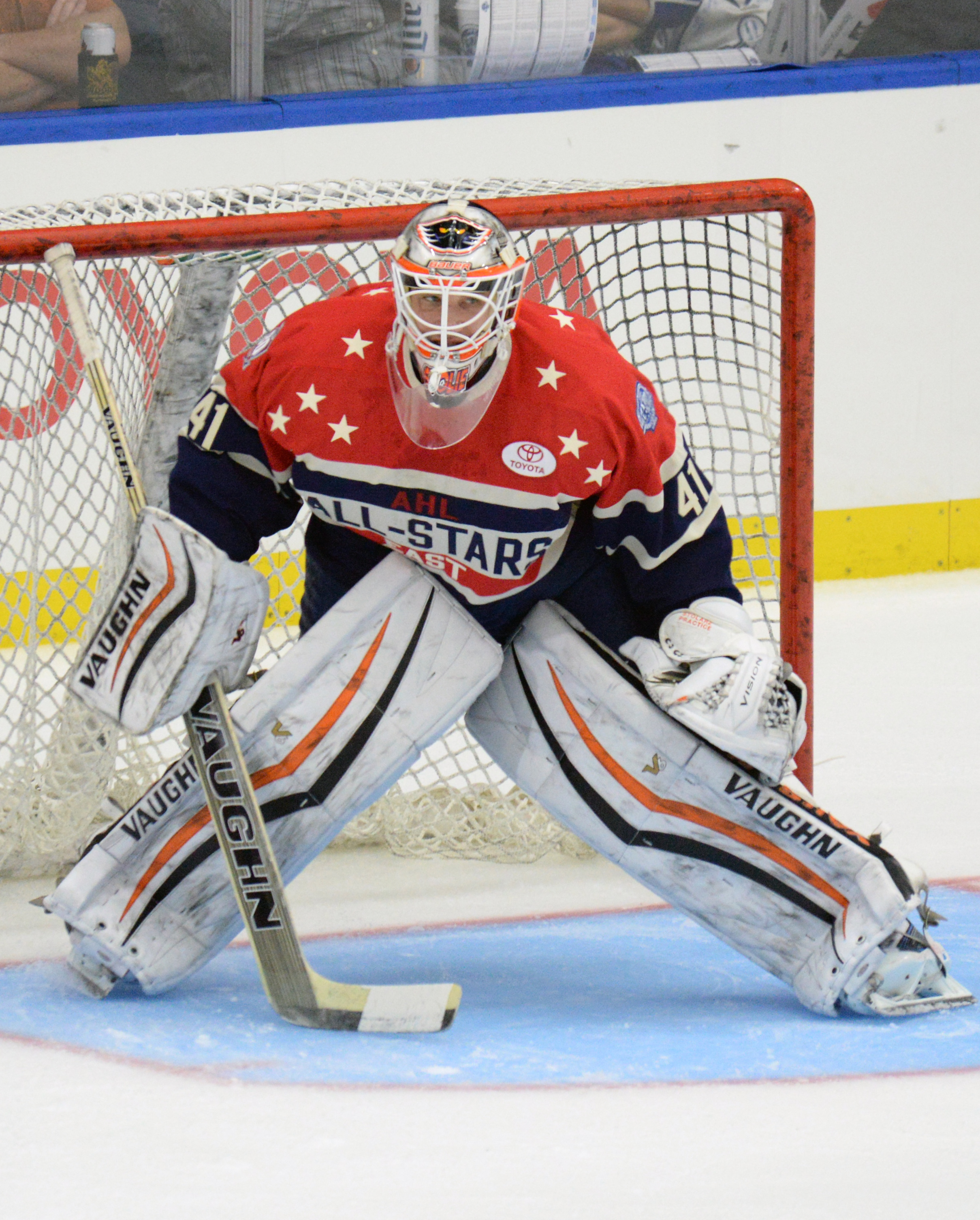
Stolarz in net at the 2016 AHL All-Star Classic

Stolarz signed a three-year entry-level contract with the Flyers on March 1, 2013. In May 2014, Stolarz received hip surgery, which caused him to miss the Flyers' development camp. Stolarz spent the 2014–15 season with the Lehigh Valley Phantoms of the American Hockey League (AHL), going 9–13–14 with a 3.28 GAA and .905 SV% in 31 games. He improved upon these numbers in the 2015–16 season, posting a 21–18–7 record, a 2.60 GAA, and a .916 SV%. On March 2, 2016, Stolarz set a Phantoms franchise record for saves, stopping 51 shots in a 3–2 shootout win over the Syracuse Crunch. Stolarz and Lehigh Valley teammate Nick Cousins also appeared at the 2016 AHL All-Star Classic that January.

When Michal Neuvirth was placed on the injured reserve with a sprained knee, Stolarz was called up to the Flyers on November 13, 2016. It was his ninth major-league recall in three seasons; at no point in the first eight did he play in an NHL game. Stolarz made his NHL debut on November 27, 2016, in a 5–3 victory over the Calgary Flames. In doing so, he became the first goaltender born in New Jersey to play in an NHL game. He played seven games with the Flyers in the 2016–17 season, including one shutout against the Detroit Red Wings, and posted a 2–1–1 record with a 2.07 GAA and a .928 SV%.

In April 2017, Stolarz underwent surgery to repair a medial collateral ligament tear in his right knee. That June, Stolarz was named as one of eleven Flyers that were protected from the 2017 NHL expansion draft. On July 15, 2017, the Flyers signed Stolarz and fellow goaltender Alex Lyon to one-year, two way contracts. In September 2017, Stolarz underwent his second knee surgery of the year, repairing a torn left meniscus. Recovery, as well as a follow-up surgery, kept Stolarz off of the roster for nearly the entire 2017–18 season. He returned for three rehab assignments with the Reading Royals of the ECHL and one appearance with the Phantoms.

Stolarz received a qualifying offer from the Flyers on June 25, 2018, and was re-signed to a one-year, two-way contract as a restricted free agent on July 18. He spent the bulk of the 2018–19 season with the Phantoms, but after a series of injuries befell Neuvirth, Lyon, and Brian Elliott, and Calvin Pickard was traded, Stolarz and rookie Carter Hart became the Flyers' primary goaltenders by January 2019. On January 29, 2019, Stolarz shut out the New York Rangers 1–0. In his final game with the Flyers on February 12, 2019, Stolarz made 35 saves in a 5–4 win over the Minnesota Wild.

==== Edmonton Oilers ====
On February 15, 2019, the Flyers traded Stolarz to the Edmonton Oilers in exchange for goaltender Cam Talbot. Stolarz made his team debut on February 27, 2019, replacing starting goaltender Mikko Koskinen in the second period of a 6–2 loss to the Toronto Maple Leafs. He made his first start for the team on March 9, 2019, in 3–2 overtime loss against the Maple Leafs when Koskinen came down with the flu. Stolarz became a free agent at the end of the 2019 season. In a combined 18 games for the Flyers and Oilers in the 2018–19 season, he posted a 4–5–3 record with one shutout, a 3.45 GAA, and a .901 SV%.

==== Anaheim Ducks ====
On July 3, 2019, the Anaheim Ducks signed Stolarz out of free agency to a two-year, $1.5 million contract. He had competition for a roster spot, as the Ducks also had veteran goaltenders John Gibson and Ryan Miller under contract. Stolarz was assigned to the San Diego Gulls, the Ducks' AHL affiliate, on September 26, 2019. Stolarz spent most of the 2019–20 season with the Gulls, accumulating a 21–12–5 record, 2.65 GAA, and .922 SV% in 38 games and making an appearance at the AHL All-Star Classic before being called up to the Ducks on March 1, 2020. Stolarz made his first start for the Ducks on March 11, 2020, in what would be the final regular season game played by the Ducks before the NHL suspended play due to the COVID-19 pandemic. He made 33 out of 35 saves in a 4–2 loss against the St. Louis Blues.

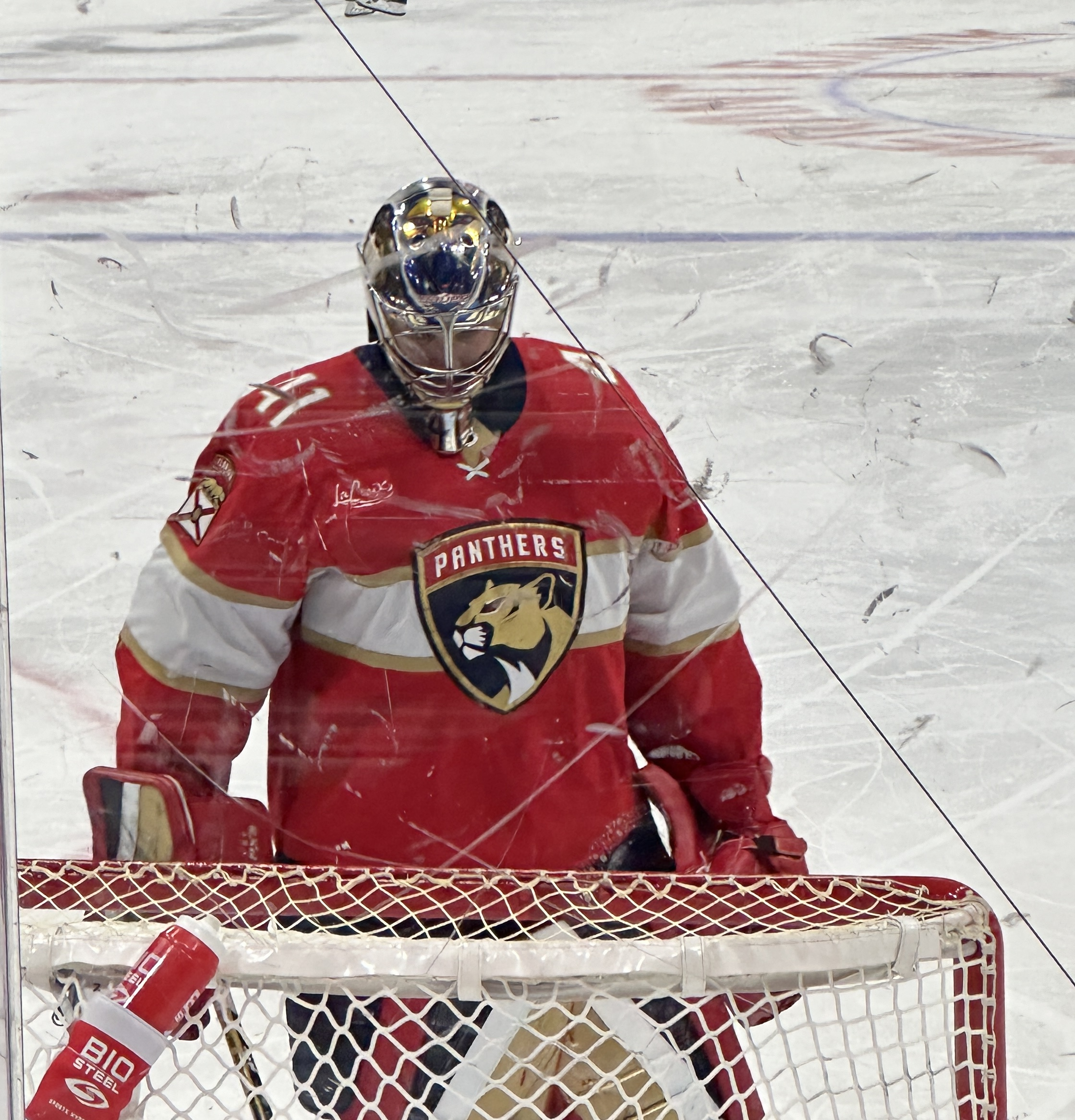
Stolarz with the Florida Panthers in 2024

On January 7, 2021, the Ducks signed Stolarz to a two-year contract extension, going through the 2022–23 NHL season. In his second start as a Duck on March 28, 2021, Stolarz stopped 38 shots in a 3–2 overtime victory over the Blues. It was his first NHL win since February 12, 2019. On April 12, Stolarz set a Ducks franchise record for most saves by a goalie in a shutout, stopping 46 pucks in a 4–0 win over the San Jose Sharks. Stolarz spent much of the shortened 2021 season on the Ducks' taxi squad. In his eight appearances, he amassed a 4–3–0 record with 2.20 GAA, a .926 SV%, and one shutout.

==== Florida Panthers ====
Following four seasons within the Ducks organization, Stolarz left as a free agent and was signed to a one-year, $1.1 million contract with the Florida Panthers for the 2023–24 season on July 1, 2023. Stolarz made his NHL playoff debut on June 15, 2024, in game four of the Stanley Cup Final against the Edmonton Oilers.

==== Toronto Maple Leafs ====
After winning a Stanley Cup with the Panthers, Stolarz left the team as an unrestricted free agent, and signed a two-year, $5 million contract with the Toronto Maple Leafs on July 1, 2024. In his first season with the Maple Leafs, Stolarz led the NHL in save percentage, ending the 2024–25 season with a .926 SV%. That season, he finished fifth in voting for the Vezina Trophy. On September 29, 2025, Stolarz agreed to a four-year, $15 million contract extension with the Maple Leafs.

== International play ==
Medal record

Men's ice hockey

Representing the United States

World Championships
Bronze medal – third place	2021 Latvia	

Stolarz was selected to represent the United States at the 2014 World Junior Ice Hockey Championships. He played a shutout game against Germany, stopping all 15 shots faced in an 8–0 United States victory.

Stolarz made his senior international debut at the 2021 IIHF World Championship, starting game one in goal for the United States. He suffered an ankle injury five minutes into the first period of the first game, however, and had to be replaced by backup goaltender Jake Oettinger. On May 25, 2021, it was announced that Stolarz would not return for the remainder of the series. Team USA took bronze in the tournament after defeating Germany in the Final.

== Career statistics ==
=== Regular season and playoffs ===
Bold indicates league leader

			Regular season									Playoffs
Season	Team	League	GP	W	L	T/OT	MIN	GA	SO	GAA	SV%	GP	W	L	MIN	GA	SO	GAA	SV%
2011–12	Corpus Christi IceRays	NAHL	50	23	22	4	2,939	139	3	2.84	.920	—	—	—	—	—	—	—	—
2012–13	Omaha Mavericks	WCHA	8	2	5	0	421	18	1	2.56	.898	—	—	—	—	—	—	—	—
2012–13	London Knights	OHL	20	13	3	2	1,153	44	1	2.29	.920	18	13	5	1,115	47	1	2.53	.923
2013–14	London Knights	OHL	35	25	5	2	1,927	81	4	2.52	.926	3	3	0	180	6	0	2.00	.933
2014–15	Lehigh Valley Phantoms	AHL	31	9	13	4	1,592	87	2	3.28	.905	—	—	—	—	—	—	—	—
2015–16	Lehigh Valley Phantoms	AHL	47	21	18	7	2,726	118	0	2.60	.916	—	—	—	—	—	—	—	—
2016–17	Lehigh Valley Phantoms	AHL	29	18	9	0	1,645	80	1	2.92	.911	—	—	—	—	—	—	—	—
2016–17	Philadelphia Flyers	NHL	7	2	1	1	377	13	1	2.07	.928	—	—	—	—	—	—	—	—
2017–18	Reading Royals	ECHL	3	1	1	0	179	9	0	3.02	.902	—	—	—	—	—	—	—	—
2017–18	Lehigh Valley Phantoms	AHL	1	0	1	0	59	6	0	6.08	.829	—	—	—	—	—	—	—	—
2018–19	Lehigh Valley Phantoms	AHL	5	2	0	2	268	16	0	3.58	.901	—	—	—	—	—	—	—	—
2018–19	Philadelphia Flyers	NHL	12	4	3	3	630	35	1	3.33	.902	—	—	—	—	—	—	—	—
2018–19	Edmonton Oilers	NHL	6	0	2	0	239	15	0	3.77	.897	—	—	—	—	—	—	—	—
2019–20	San Diego Gulls	AHL	39	21	12	6	2,321	103	0	2.66	.922	—	—	—	—	—	—	—	—
2019–20	Anaheim Ducks	NHL	1	0	1	0	59	2	0	2.04	.944	—	—	—	—	—	—	—	—
2020–21	San Diego Gulls	AHL	3	3	0	0	184	9	0	2.93	.920	—	—	—	—	—	—	—	—
2020–21	Anaheim Ducks	NHL	8	4	3	0	464	17	1	2.20	.926	—	—	—	—	—	—	—	—
2021–22	Anaheim Ducks	NHL	28	12	8	3	1,507	67	3	2.67	.917	—	—	—	—	—	—	—	—
2022–23	Anaheim Ducks	NHL	19	5	6	0	821	51	0	3.73	.899	—	—	—	—	—	—	—	—
2023–24	Florida Panthers	NHL	27	16	7	2	1,506	51	2	**2.03**	**.925**	1	0	0	35	3	0	5.17	.842
2024–25	Toronto Maple Leafs	NHL	34	21	8	3	1,987	71	4	2.14	**.926**	7	4	2	410	15	0	2.19	.901
2025–26	Toronto Maple Leafs	NHL	26	10	10	3	1,389	76	0	3.28	.893	—	—	—	—	—	—	—	—
NHL totals			168	74	49	15	8,977	398	12	2.66	.914	8	4	2	445	18	0	2.43	.894

=== International ===
Year	Team	Event	Result	GP	W	L	OTL	MIN	GA	SO	GAA	SV%
2014	United States	WJC	5th	1	1	0	0	60	0	1	0.00	1.000
2021	United States	WC	3rd place, bronze medalist(s)	1	0	0	0	5	0	0	0.00	1.000
Junior totals				1	1	0	0	60	0	1	0.00	1.000
Senior totals				1	0	0	0	5	0	0	0.00	1.000

== Awards and honors ==
Award	Year	Ref
NHL
Stanley Cup champion	2024	
