= Guy Hebert =

American ice hockey player (born 1967)

- Born: January 7, 1967 (age 59) Troy, New York, U.S.
- Height: 5 ft 11 in (180 cm)
- Weight: 185 lb (84 kg; 13 st 3 lb)
- Position: Goaltender
- Caught: Left
- Played for: St. Louis Blues; Mighty Ducks of Anaheim; New York Rangers
- National team: United States
- NHL draft: 159th overall, 1987; St. Louis Blues
- Playing career: 1989–2001

Guy Andre Hebert (French pronunciation: [ɡi eˈbɛʁ]; born January 7, 1967) is an American former professional ice hockey goaltender. He is a graduate of La Salle Institute in Troy and Hamilton College in Clinton, New York. Despite being American, he uses the French pronunciation of his first and last name. During his National Hockey League (NHL) career, he played for the St. Louis Blues, Mighty Ducks of Anaheim, and New York Rangers. Hebert currently works as associate host on Victory+ for Anaheim Ducks games.

== NHL career ==
Hebert was drafted by the St. Louis Blues in 1987, when he was a sophomore at Hamilton College. Hebert earned First Team All-America honors during his senior season at Hamilton College, with a record of 18 wins and 7 losses. Hebert started his professional career with the Peoria Rivermen of the International Hockey League (IHL), and in his second season won the IHL Championship, the Turner Cup, in 1990-91. Hebert was called up to the St. Louis Blues in December 1991 and won his first NHL start against the Buffalo Sabres, 6-3 on December 11, 1991. With Peoria, Hebert was named as an IHL Second Team All Star and also shared the IHL's James Norris Memorial Trophy with Pat Jablonski the same year.

Hebert was the first pick of the Mighty Ducks of Anaheim in the 1993 NHL Expansion Draft. Hebert's first head coach with Anaheim was Ron Wilson, who had coached Hebert in the 1990 Goodwill Games. Hebert played with the Ducks organization from its inaugural season in 1993 until midway through the 2000–01 NHL season, when he was placed on waivers and claimed by the New York Rangers. At that time he was the last of the original Ducks still with Anaheim. Hebert played in thirteen games for the Rangers before retiring in 2001. Hebert still ranks first or second in every major goalkeeping statistic of the Ducks franchise and led the team to its first NHL playoff appearance and series win with a Game 7 shutout (3-0) against the Phoenix Coyotes in the 1996-97 playoffs. While with Anaheim, Hebert was selected to the 1997 NHL All-Star Game.

== International career ==
Hebert was selected to the United States national team for the 1990 Goodwill Games, earning the silver medal in a shootout loss to the Soviet Union. He played for the United States at the 1994 Men's World Ice Hockey Championships in Italy, as the US team beat Russia for the first time since the Miracle on Ice in 1980, finishing the tournament in fourth place, and Hebert earned USA Hockey's Bob Johnson Award for excellence in international play. Hebert played for the United States team that won the 1996 World Cup of Hockey, and also for the United States at the 1998 Winter Olympics, where they finished sixth.

== Post-playing career ==
Today, Hebert works for Victory+ as a television hockey analyst for the Anaheim Ducks. Hebert previously worked for Bally Sports West & SoCal until Anaheim moved to Victory+.

== Career statistics ==
=== Regular season and playoffs ===
			Regular season									Playoffs
Season	Team	League	GP	W	L	T	MIN	GA	SO	GAA	SV%	GP	W	L	MIN	GA	SO	GAA	SV%
1985–86	Hamilton College	NESCAC	18	4	12	2	1011	69	2	4.09	—	—	—	—	—	—	—	—	—
1986–87	Hamilton College	NESCAC	18	12	5	0	1070	40	3	2.24	—	2	1	1	134	6	0	2.69	—
1987–88	Hamilton College	NESCAC	9	5	3	0	510	22	1	2.59	—	1	0	1	60	3	0	3.00	—
1988–89	Hamilton College	NESCAC	25	18	7	0	1454	62	2	2.56	—	2	1	1	126	4	0	1.90	—
1989–90	Peoria Rivermen	IHL	30	7	13	7	1706	124	1	4.36	—	2	0	1	76	5	0	3.95	—
1990–91	Peoria Rivermen	IHL	36	24	10	1	2093	100	2	2.87	—	8	3	4	458	32	0	4.19	—
1991–92	St. Louis Blues	NHL	13	5	5	1	738	36	0	2.93	.908	—	—	—	—	—	—	—	—
1991–92	Peoria Rivermen	IHL	29	20	9	0	1731	98	0	3.40	—	4	3	1	239	9	0	2.26	—
1992–93	St. Louis Blues	NHL	24	8	8	2	1210	74	1	3.67	.883	1	0	0	2	0	0	0.00	1.000
1993–94	Mighty Ducks of Anaheim	NHL	52	20	27	3	2991	141	2	2.83	.907	—	—	—	—	—	—	—	—
1994–95	Mighty Ducks of Anaheim	NHL	39	12	20	4	2092	109	2	3.13	.904	—	—	—	—	—	—	—	—
1995–96	Mighty Ducks of Anaheim	NHL	59	28	23	5	3326	157	4	2.83	.914	—	—	—	—	—	—	—	—
1996–97	Mighty Ducks of Anaheim	NHL	67	29	25	12	3863	172	4	2.67	.919	9	4	4	534	18	1	2.02	.929
1997–98	Mighty Ducks of Anaheim	NHL	46	13	24	6	2660	130	3	2.93	.903	—	—	—	—	—	—	—	—
1998–99	Mighty Ducks of Anaheim	NHL	69	31	29	9	4083	165	6	2.42	.922	4	0	3	208	15	0	4.33	.879
1999–2000	Mighty Ducks of Anaheim	NHL	68	28	31	9	3976	166	4	2.51	.908	—	—	—	—	—	—	—	—
2000–01	Mighty Ducks of Anaheim	NHL	41	12	23	4	2215	115	2	3.12	.897	—	—	—	—	—	—	—	—
2000–01	New York Rangers	NHL	13	5	7	1	735	42	0	3.43	.897	—	—	—	—	—	—	—	—
NHL totals			491	191	222	56	27,889	1307	28	2.81	.909	14	4	7	744	33	1	2.66	.913

=== International ===
Year	Team	Event	GP	W	L	T	MIN	GA	SO	GAA
1994	United States	WC	6	4	2	0	300	18	0	3.60
1996	United States	WCH	1	1	0	0	60	3	0	3.00
Senior totals			7	5	2	0	360	21	0	3.50
