= 2007 Stanley Cup Final =

2007 ice hockey championship series

	1	2	3	4	5	Total
Ottawa Senators	2	0	5	2	2	1
Anaheim Ducks	3	1	3	3	6	4
- Location(s): Anaheim: Honda Center (1, 2, 5); Ottawa: Scotiabank Place (3, 4)
- Coaches: Anaheim: Randy Carlyle; Ottawa: Bryan Murray
- Captains: Anaheim: Scott Niedermayer; Ottawa: Daniel Alfredsson
- National anthems: Ottawa: Lyndon Slewidge (game 3); Alanis Morissette (game 4); Anaheim: Marine Sgt. Juan Contreras
- Referees: Paul Devorski (1, 3, 5); Dan O'Halloran (1, 3, 5); Bill McCreary (2, 4); Brad Watson (2, 4)
- Dates: May 28 – June 6, 2007
- MVP: Scott Niedermayer (Ducks)
- Series-winning goal: Travis Moen (15:44, second)
- Hall of Famers: Ducks: Scott Niedermayer (2013); Chris Pronger (2015); Teemu Selanne (2017); Senators: Daniel Alfredsson (2022); Officials: Bill McCreary (2014)
- Networks: Canada: (English): CBC (French): RDS; United States: (English): Versus (1–2), NBC (3–5)
- Announcers: (CBC) Bob Cole, Harry Neale, and Greg Millen (RDS) Pierre Houde and Yvon Pedneault (Versus/NBC) Mike Emrick and Eddie Olczyk (NHL International) Dave Strader and Joe Micheletti

The 2007 Stanley Cup Final was the championship series of the National Hockey League's (NHL) 2006–07 season, and the culmination of the 2007 Stanley Cup playoffs. It was contested between the Western Conference champion Anaheim Ducks and the Eastern Conference champion Ottawa Senators. It was the second appearance in the Finals for Anaheim since 2003 (known at the time as the Mighty Ducks of Anaheim), when they lost to the New Jersey Devils. It was the first appearance for the Senators since entering the NHL as an expansion team in 1992. Anaheim defeated Ottawa in five games and were awarded their first Stanley Cup, becoming the eleventh post-1967 expansion team to win the NHL championship trophy, and the first team from California to win the Stanley Cup.

This was the first Finals since 1999 in which both teams were seeking their first Stanley Cup and the last until 2018, the fifth straight Finals to feature a team vying for its first Stanley Cup, and the first time since 1967 that a team from the Province of Ontario made it to the Finals.

Brothers Scott and Rob Niedermayer both played for the Ducks team, becoming the first set of brothers to win the Stanley Cup together since Duane and Brent Sutter accomplished the feat twice with the New York Islanders in 1982 and 1983.

== Paths to the Finals ==
=== Anaheim Ducks ===
Prior to the season, the Ducks had been the pick of many in the media to make it to the Final, and they did not disappoint. The second-seeded Anaheim Ducks defeated both the seventh seeded Minnesota Wild and third seeded Vancouver Canucks in five games before defeating their rivals in the top seeded Detroit Red Wings in six games in the Western Conference Final. The Ducks had the most penalties out of any team during the post-season and had one suspension going into the final, but had a top penalty-kill percentage. They were led by two Norris Trophy candidates captain Scott Niedermayer and Chris Pronger, the scoring touches of Andy McDonald, Teemu Selanne, Ryan Getzlaf, and the goaltending of Jean-Sebastien Giguere. The Ducks were looking to shut down Ottawa's offense with the checking line of Rob Niedermayer, Samuel Pahlsson and Travis Moen, and overall team defense.

=== Ottawa Senators ===
The fourth-seeded Ottawa Senators defeated the fifth seeded Pittsburgh Penguins, and upset both the second seeded New Jersey Devils and the Presidents' Trophy winner Buffalo Sabres, all in five games apiece, en route to their first Eastern Conference championship. The Senators became the first team from Ontario to make the Finals since their archrival Toronto Maple Leafs did so in 1967. Ottawa was led by the top line of captain Daniel Alfredsson, Dany Heatley, and Jason Spezza, who combined for 23 goals in the first three rounds, and the goaltending of Ray Emery. Other Senators who played pivotal roles were forwards Mike Fisher and Dean McAmmond and defencemen Chris Phillips and Anton Volchenkov. The Senators were looking to work past Anaheim's defense with their speed and higher-scoring offense, although both teams played a similar style of responsible team defense.

Anaheim had home ice advantage for the series, as they finished the regular season with 110 points to Ottawa's 105. The attention leading into the finals was Ottawa being "Canada's Team" despite Anaheim having five more Canadian skaters than the Senators. Many fans were saying that the Stanley Cup needed to be brought back to Canada after a 14-year drought (up to that point, the last Canadian team to hoist the Stanley Cup was the 1993 Montreal Canadiens, who defeated the Los Angeles Kings).

== Game summaries ==
Only four players remained on the Ducks roster from 2003, including the Conn Smythe Trophy winner, Jean-Sebastien Giguere. The 2003 club's general manager, Bryan Murray, was now the Ottawa head coach.

Two Ottawa-area players were in the finals, playing for the Ducks.

The Senators and Ducks had never met in the playoffs before, and had not played each other since January 19, 2006, when the Ducks (then known as the Mighty Ducks) won 4–3 in overtime in Ottawa.

=== Historical facts ===
This was the first time since the 1925 Victoria Cougars that a team from the west coast of North America won the Stanley Cup, and the first time an NHL team from the west coast had done so. The Ducks are the fourth west coast team to win the Cup, and the first from California.

Senators captain Daniel Alfredsson, from Sweden, was the first European-born-and-raised captain to lead his team to the finals. Previously, only Canadians or an American had captained teams in the finals. The Ducks were captained by a Canadian (Scott Niedermayer) and had more Canadian players than the Senators.

As of the end of the 2021 playoffs, the Senators remain the only Canadian team to represent the East in the finals since 1993 (the 2021 Montreal Canadiens did not represent the East in the 2021 Stanley Cup Final due to temporary abolishment of the conferences). These finals marked the third straight in which a Canadian franchise lost against a franchise based in the southern half of the United States (previous Canadian teams in the last few Stanley Cup Final were the 2004 Calgary Flames and the 2006 Edmonton Oilers, and not counting the 2004–05 NHL season lockout).

The series marked the first time that two teams from the early-'90s expansion era faced each other in the final. (Anaheim had started play in 1993, Ottawa in 1992)

It was the first finals since 1999 where neither finalist had won the Stanley Cup previously (the NHL does not recognize the championships of the original Ottawa Senators as part of the current franchise's history).

As well, this was the third season in a row that the Cup was won by a team winning its first Cup after Tampa Bay in 2004 and Carolina in 2006. It was also the 1st finals since the 2002 Stanley Cup Final, when Detroit defeated Carolina in 5 games, that didn't need a 7th game after New Jersey in 2003, Tampa Bay in 2004, and Carolina in 2006 all won in 7 games

The third game, in Ottawa on June 2, was attended by 91-year-old Russell Williams as a guest of the Senators. He had attended the last Finals game in Ottawa (April 13, 1927) versus the Boston Bruins in the old Ottawa Auditorium. His presence was a good-luck charm, as Ottawa won the game he attended.

=== Sens Mile ===
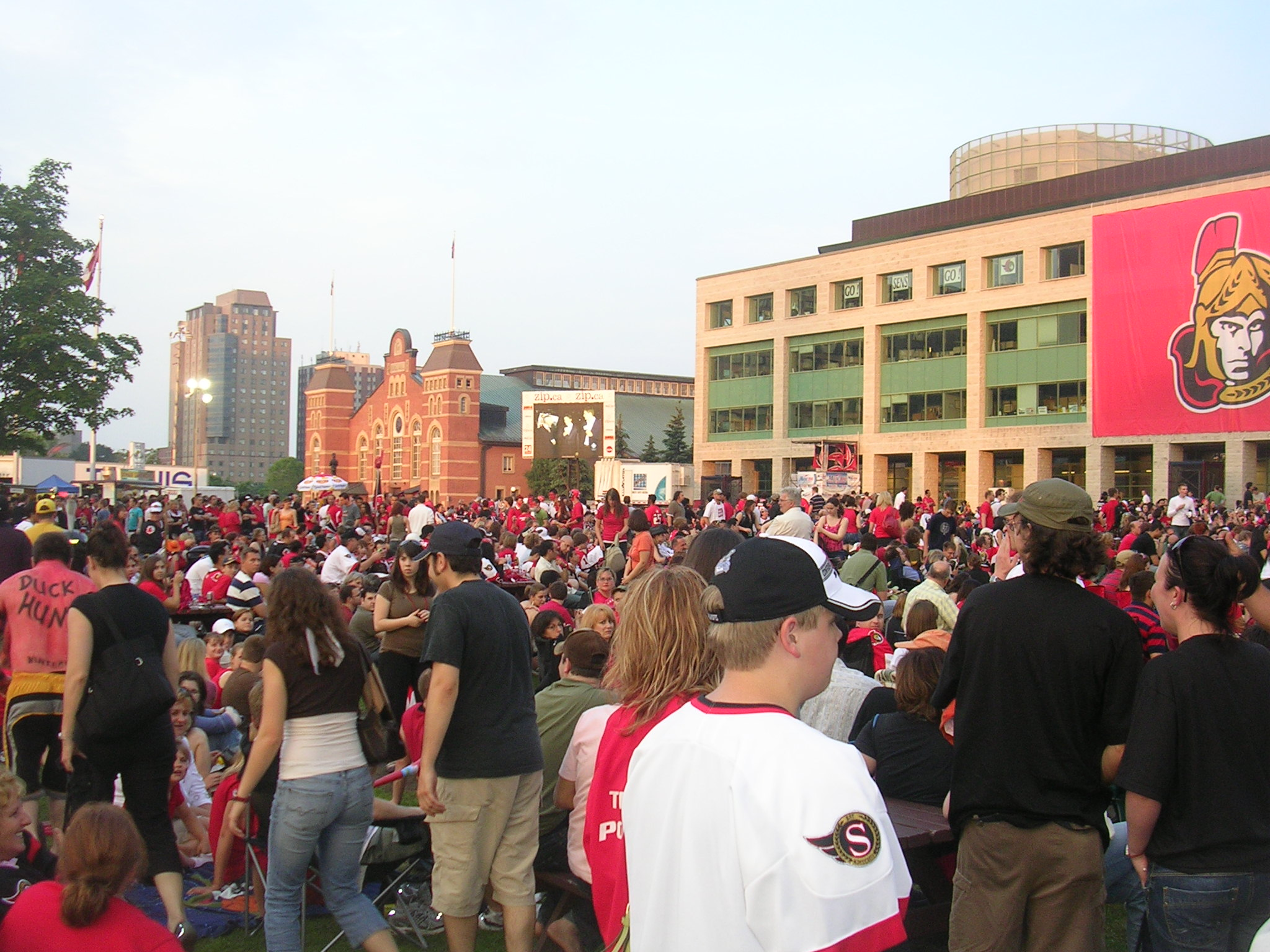
Ottawa City Hall before game three of the Stanley Cup Final

Much like the Red Mile in Calgary during the Flames' 2004 cup run and the Blue Mile in Edmonton during the Oilers' 2006 Cup run, Ottawa Senators fans took to the streets to celebrate their team's success. The idea to have a Sens Mile began as a grassroots campaign on Facebook by Ottawa residents before game four of the Ottawa-Buffalo Eastern Conference Finals series. Their idea was to use Elgin Street as a gathering place for Sens fans to celebrate after games won. Since Scotiabank Place (now Canadian Tire Centre) is located in suburban Ottawa, spontaneous celebration did not occur during the Senators' Cup run until that point, like it did in Calgary and Edmonton where the arenas are located more centrally.

When the Senators beat the Sabres in game five of the Eastern Conference Final, people flocked to Elgin Street in celebration.

For the Stanley Cup Final, large video screens were installed at Ottawa City Hall for fans to view. After the Senators won game three of the series, fans celebrated on Elgin Street once again, and Ottawa Police closed the street down.

=== Game one ===
May 28	Ottawa Senators	2–3	Anaheim Ducks	Honda Center	Recap

The scene was festive at Honda Center in Anaheim with several Hollywood celebrities on hand, including former movie star and then California Governor, Arnold Schwarzenegger, who dropped the puck for the ceremonial face-off. As in their previous series, the Senators struck first. Mike Fisher started off the scoring in the series with a power-play goal 1:38 into the first period that travelled high in the air, landed behind Giguere and trickled over the line. Although Ottawa scored first, Anaheim took over play during the course of the period. The Ducks replied nine minutes later with a goal from Andy McDonald at even strength. Ottawa was unable to get even one shot on goal in the last eleven minutes of the first, and the period ended with the score tied 1–1. The shots were 8–3 for Anaheim. Early into the second, Wade Redden scored the only goal of the period, another power-play goal for Ottawa from the blue line, putting the Senators up 2–1. Play was even for the most part, as indicated by the 10–10 shot total of the period. The Ducks dominated most of the play in the third, tying the game 2–2 at five minutes into the third on a goal from Ryan Getzlaf, followed by a dramatic game-winning goal by Travis Moen with three minutes left in the third. The shots ended 32–20 in Anaheim's favour. In 2009, it was disclosed by Tom Molloy, hockey coach and friend of Dany Heatley, that Heatley was injured by a cross-check of Chris Pronger in this game. Heatley would continue to play for the rest of the series and the injury was kept secret. Heatley would score only one goal in the series.

Scoring summary
Period	Team	Goal	Assist(s)	Time	Score
1st	OTT	Mike Fisher (4) – pp	Andrej Meszaros (5) and Mike Comrie (4)	01:38	1–0 OTT
1st	ANA	Andy McDonald (6)	Teemu Selanne (8)	10:55	1–1
2nd	OTT	Wade Redden (3) – pp	Daniel Alfredsson (8) and Jason Spezza (14)	04:36	2–1 OTT
3rd	ANA	Ryan Getzlaf (6)	Corey Perry (6) and Ric Jackman (1)	05:44	2–2
3rd	ANA	Travis Moen	Rob Niedermayer (4) and Scott Niedermayer (7)	17:09	3–2 ANA
Penalty summary
Period	Team	Player	Penalty	Time	PIM
1st	ANA	Scott Niedermayer	High-sticking	00:53	2:00
1st	OTT	Dany Heatley	Tripping	02:34	2:00
1st	ANA	Ric Jackman	Roughing	14:14	2:00
2nd	OTT	Wade Redden	Hooking	00:59	2:00
2nd	ANA	Ryan Getzlaf	Cross-checking	03:52	2:00
2nd	ANA	Francois Beauchemin	Tripping	06:34	2:00
2nd	ANA	Samuel Pahlsson	Slashing	06:59	2:00
3rd	OTT	Christoph Schubert	Slashing	06:37	2:00
3rd	OTT	Andrej Meszaros	Interference	10:03	2:00
3rd	ANA	Scott Niedermayer	Hooking	13:08	2:00
3rd	ANA	Chris Pronger	Hooking	19:16	2:00

Shots by period
Team	1	2	3	Total
Ottawa	3	10	7	20
Anaheim	8	10	14	32

=== Game two ===
May 30	Ottawa Senators	0–1	Anaheim Ducks	Honda Center	Recap

Strong defence and goaltending from both sides kept scoring down to nothing until Samuel Pahlsson scored the game-winning goal for the Ducks 14:16 into the third period. Once again, Anaheim's checking line of Samuel Pahlsson, Travis Moen, and Rob Niedermayer managed to shut down and out-score the Ottawa top line of Daniel Alfredsson, Dany Heatley, and Jason Spezza. Anaheim again led the shot count with 31 shots to Ottawa's 16. Ray Emery recorded his third shutout of the postseason.

Scoring summary
Period	Team	Goal	Assist(s)	Time	Score
1st	None				
2nd	None				
3rd	ANA	Samuel Pahlsson (3)	Unassisted	14:16	1–0 ANA
Penalty summary
Period	Team	Player	Penalty	Time	PIM
1st	OTT	Mike Comrie	Boarding	02:17	2:00
1st	ANA	Drew Miller	Interference	05:40	2:00
1st	OTT	Anton Volchenkov	Boarding	08:05	2:00
1st	ANA	Shawn Thornton	Charging	12:31	2:00
1st	ANA	Chris Pronger	Slashing	13:24	2:00
1st	OTT	Mike Fisher	Roughing	18:07	2:00
2nd	OTT	Tom Preissing	Tripping	18:04	2:00
2nd	ANA	Andy McDonald	Hooking	19:36	2:00
3rd	None				

Shots by period
Team	1	2	3	Total
Ottawa	7	4	5	16
Anaheim	12	14	5	31

=== Game three ===
June 2	Anaheim Ducks	3–5	Ottawa Senators	Scotiabank Place	Recap

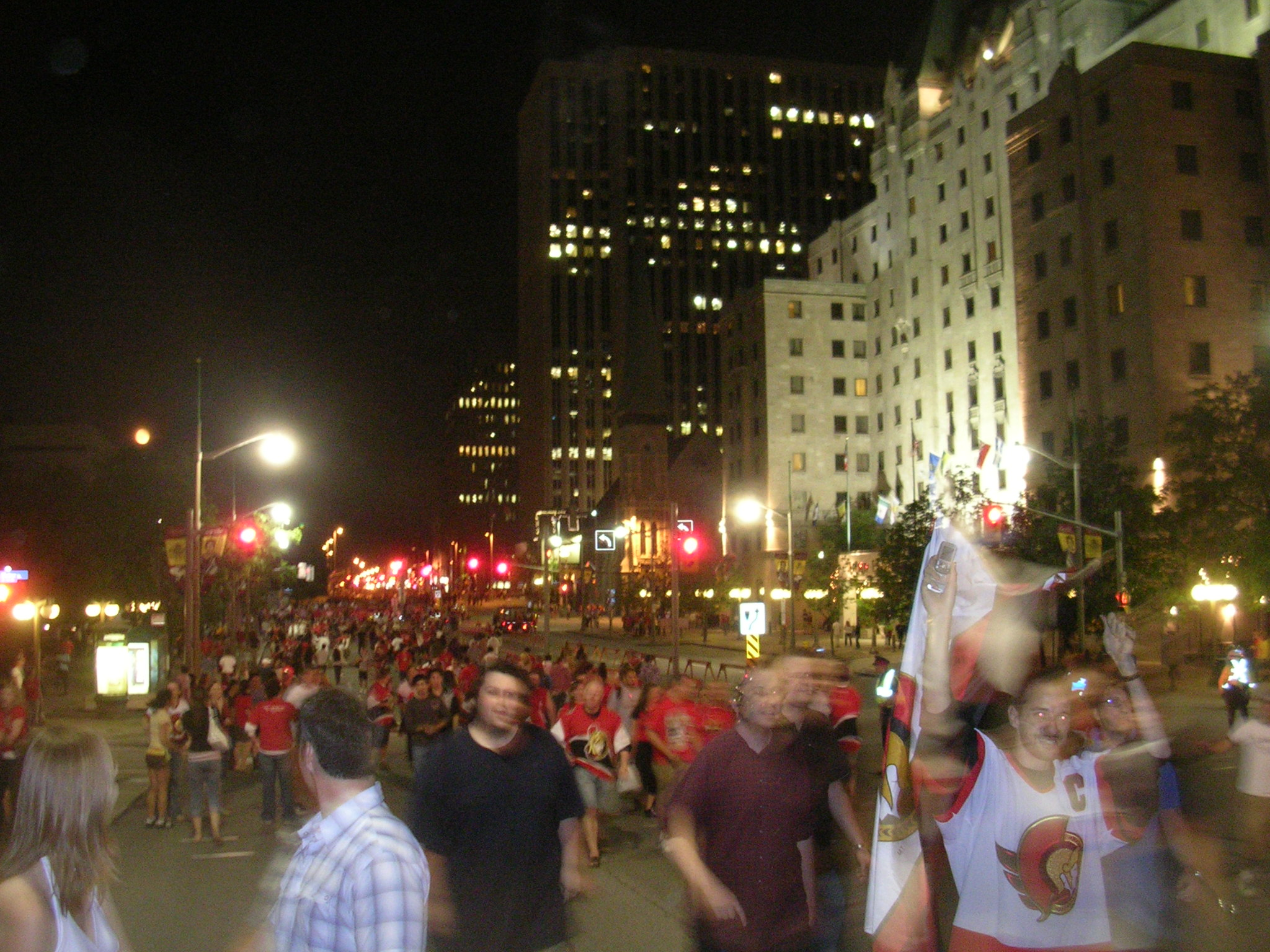
Elgin Street after the Senators game three win.

Play now switched to Ottawa, for the first Stanley Cup Final game in Ottawa in 80 years (as well as the first Finals game played in the province of Ontario for the first time in 40 years). The Senators hoped to regroup, being down 2–0, with two wins at home.

After an energetic crowd took over the singing of O Canada from Ontario Provincial Police Constable Lyndon Slewidge, the Senators came out tentative and Andy McDonald opened the scoring in game three to give Anaheim a 1–0 lead 5:39 into the first period. Ottawa replied 11 minutes later with a goal by Chris Neil.

Corey Perry scored to give Anaheim a 2–1 lead at 5:20 in the second; the lead was short-lived, as Mike Fisher scored 27 seconds later. Two minutes later, Ryan Getzlaf scored to once again give Anaheim a one-goal advantage. Ottawa then replied with a goal by Daniel Alfredsson.

Alfredsson's goal was initially waved off by referees because the puck went in off his skate, appearing to have been kicked in. The NBC broadcasters thought the goal would be waved off. But the officials reviewing the goal ruled that there was no kicking motion and allowed the goal to stand, tying the game once again. NHL rules allow the redirection of a puck with the foot, as long as no kicking motion is involved, and this was the ruling.

Later in the period, Dean McAmmond got credited with a goal that ricocheted off Chris Pronger's stick. Near the beginning of the third period, McAmmond was injured after receiving an elbow to the head from Pronger, in what might have been retribution for the goal, as McAmmond's shot had appeared to have been aimed at Pronger, and not at the net. As in the previous series against Detroit (in which he delivered a similar blow to Detroit's Tomas Holmstrom), Pronger was not penalized during the game for his hit on McAmmond, but was later suspended for game four. Pronger claimed the elbow was accidental and the Ducks did not appeal the suspension. McAmmond did not return to play in the series, and this was a loss for the Senators as he had been an effective player.

Anton Volchenkov scored midway through the third to give the Senators a two-goal lead. Neither team scored any goals through the balance of the period, and Ottawa won the game 5–3, their first and only win in the Stanley Cup Final, as of 2026.

Scoring summary
Period	Team	Goal	Assist(s)	Time	Score
1st	ANA	Andy McDonald (7) – pp	Teemu Selanne (9)	05:39	1–0 ANA
1st	OTT	Chris Neil (2)	Chris Kelly (3) and Andrej Meszaros (6)	16:10	1–1
2nd	ANA	Corey Perry (5)	Dustin Penner (4) and Ryan Getzlaf (9)	05:20	2–1 ANA
2nd	OTT	Mike Fisher (5)	Anton Volchenkov (4)	05:47	2–2
2nd	ANA	Ryan Getzlaf (7)	Dustin Penner (5) and Corey Perry (7)	07:38	3–2 ANA
2nd	OTT	Daniel Alfredsson (11) – pp	Wade Redden (7) and Joe Corvo (7)	16:14	3–3
2nd	OTT	Dean McAmmond (5)	Oleg Saprykin (1) and Christoph Schubert (1)	18:34	4–3 OTT
3rd	OTT	Anton Volchenkov (2)	Antoine Vermette (3) and Chris Kelly (4)	08:22	5–3 OTT
Penalty summary
Period	Team	Player	Penalty	Time	PIM
1st	OTT	Wade Redden	Interference	03:51	2:00
1st	ANA	Brad May	Interference	06:01	2:00
1st	ANA	Travis Moen	Embellishment	11:29	2:00
1st	OTT	Mike Fisher	Roughing	11:29	2:00
2nd	ANA	Samuel Pahlsson	Roughing	02:04	2:00
2nd	OTT	Jason Spezza	Holding	02:04	2:00
2nd	ANA	Scott Niedermayer	Hooking	13:44	2:00
2nd	ANA	Sean O'Donnell	Cross-checking	15:39	2:00
3rd	ANA	Corey Perry	Roughing – double minor	02:55	4:00
3rd	ANA	Dustin Penner	Roughing	02:55	2:00
3rd	ANA	Ryan Getzlaf	Roughing	02:55	2:00
3rd	OTT	Chris Neil	Roughing	02:55	2:00
3rd	OTT	Peter Schaefer	Roughing	02:55	2:00
3rd	OTT	Mike Fisher	Roughing	02:55	2:00
3rd	ANA	Brad May	Tripping	05:43	2:00
3rd	OTT	Peter Schaefer	Interference	10:41	2:00
3rd	ANA	Ryan Getzlaf	Holding	11:05	2:00
3rd	ANA	Andy McDonald	Goaltender interference	15:29	2:00
3rd	OTT	Chris Phillips	Roughing	19:49	2:00

Shots by period
Team	1	2	3	Total
Anaheim	8	11	3	22
Ottawa	10	12	7	29

=== Game four ===
June 4	Anaheim Ducks	3–2	Ottawa Senators	Scotiabank Place	Recap

The national anthems were sung by Ottawa native Alanis Morissette, who also sang the anthem prior to the first game in October, 1992 of the Senators. The audience again took over the singing of "O Canada."

Anaheim Ducks defenceman Chris Pronger was suspended for game four because of an elbow he delivered to the head of Senator Dean McAmmond in game three. Once again, the Ducks had to deal with the loss of Pronger while the Senators were itching to win both home games and tie the series.

After nearly a full period of scoreless play, Daniel Alfredsson scored at 19:59 (0.3 seconds remained) of the first to give the Senators a 1–0 lead on a powerplay goal. The momentum seemed to continue shifting from game three in Ottawa's favor as Anaheim could only get two shots the entire period.

In the second, the Ducks replied with two goals by Andy McDonald midway through the period to put them up 2–1. Ottawa came back with two minutes left in the period to tie the game 2–2 on a goal from Dany Heatley, his only goal of the series.

The game's most controversial moment came in the final five seconds of the second period. With the puck at center ice, Alfredsson shot the puck, which hit Scott Niedermayer. The incident appeared intentional, although Alfredsson claimed after the game that it was not. Niedermayer was not injured, but the Ducks were furious, sparking a post-buzzer scrum next to the Anaheim bench before the teams left the ice for the intermission. To the surprise of NBC's broadcasters, Alfredsson was not penalized for his actions, but Mike Fisher and Samuel Pahlsson were each handed matching minors for roughing.

The Ducks responded to the incident on the score board as Dustin Penner scored at 4:07 of the third to provide the winning 3–2 Anaheim margin, putting them up 3–1 in the series and provided an opportunity for the Ducks to clinch the Cup in game five.

Scoring summary
Period	Team	Goal	Assist(s)	Time	Score
1st	OTT	Daniel Alfredsson – pp	Peter Schaefer (4) and Mike Fisher (4)	19:59	1–0 OTT
2nd	ANA	Andy McDonald (8)	Todd Marchant (3) and Corey Perry (8)	10:06	1–1
2nd	ANA	Andy McDonald (9)	Rob Niedermayer (5) and Sean O'Donnell (2)	11:06	2–1 ANA
2nd	OTT	Dany Heatley (7)	Patrick Eaves (2) and Jason Spezza (15)	18:00	2–2
3rd	ANA	Dustin Penner (3)	Teemu Selanne (10) and Andy McDonald (3)	04:07	3–2 ANA
Penalty summary
Period	Team	Player	Penalty	Time	PIM
1st	ANA	Francois Beauchemin	Slashing	00:58	2:00
1st	ANA	Corey Perry	Cross-checking	03:54	2:00
1st	OTT	Chris Neil	Goaltender interference	06:13	2:00
1st	ANA	Corey Perry	Roughing	17:11	2:00
1st	OTT	Patrick Eaves	Holding	17:11	2:00
1st	ANA	Ryan Getzlaf	Goaltender interference	18:16	2:00
2nd	OTT	Chris Neil	Interference	04:29	2:00
2nd	OTT	Chris Phillips	Hooking	08:02	2:00
2nd	ANA	Samuel Pahlsson	Roughing	20:00	2:00
2nd	OTT	Mike Fisher	Roughing	20:00	2:00
3rd	ANA	Francois Beauchemin	Holding	01:02	2:00

Shots by period
Team	1	2	3	Total
Anaheim	2	13	6	21
Ottawa	13	4	6	23

=== Game five ===
June 6	Ottawa Senators	2–6	Anaheim Ducks	Honda Center	Recap

The Ducks' home crowd at Honda Center booed every time Daniel Alfredsson touched the puck in response to Alfredsson's controversial shot at Scott Niedermayer in game four, although this did not appear to put him off his game as he scored two goals. However, his play was the only bright spot on the night for the Senators.

The final game was marked by strong play by the Ducks, and mistakes and bad luck for the Senators, as they attempted to stave off elimination and seemed to try too hard, while the Ducks played with confidence and without mistakes. The game was played 'close-to-the-vest', with only 31 shots on goal by the two teams.

In the first period, Andy McDonald and Rob Niedermayer of Anaheim scored the first and second goals, respectively. McDonald's goal came on the power play on a penalty to Ottawa for obstruction; the call that the Senators had claimed was not being called against the Ducks. The goal went off the skate of Chris Phillips, the start of an unlucky night for the Ottawa defenceman. Niedermayer's goal deflated the Senators further as it appeared that Emery should have stopped it.

In the second period, Senators captain Daniel Alfredsson cut the lead to 2–1. However, the turning point of the game came when Chris Phillips and Ray Emery were involved in a mix-up resulting in an own goal, which was awarded to Travis Moen, giving Anaheim a 3–1 lead.

Later in the period, Alfredsson scored a 'highlight-reel' short-handed goal to close the gap to 3–2. It appeared that he was trying to carry the whole team on his back, but on the same power play, defenceman Francois Beauchemin scored moments later to restore the Ducks two-goal lead, 4–2. Beauchemin's goal deflected off the shin pad of Ottawa defenceman Anton Volchenkov, the NHL's leading shot blocker, who was attempting to block the shot, behind Emery.

In the third period, Travis Moen scored to give Anaheim a commanding 5–2 lead. The Senators kept trying, and Antoine Vermette was awarded a rare penalty shot; however the puck rolled off his stick at the last moment. Corey Perry scored the final goal off of a loose pass by Ottawa to provide the winning margin of 6–2, and, with the exception of Scott Niedermayer, every member of the Ducks franchise won their first Stanley Cup.

Scoring summary
Period	Team	Goal	Assist(s)	Time	Score
1st	ANA	Andy McDonald (10) – pp	Ryan Getzlaf (10) and Chris Pronger (12)	03:41	1–0 ANA
1st	ANA	Rob Niedermayer (5)	Corey Perry (9)	17:41	2–0 ANA
2nd	OTT	Daniel Alfredsson (13)	Peter Schaefer (5) and Mike Fisher (5)	11:27	2–1 ANA
2nd	ANA	Travis Moen (6)	Unassisted	15:44	3–1 ANA
2nd	OTT	Daniel Alfredsson – sh	Unassisted	17:38	3–2 ANA
2nd	ANA	Francois Beauchemin (4) – pp	Andy McDonald (4)	18:28	4–2 ANA
3rd	ANA	Travis Moen (7)	Scott Niedermayer (8) and Samuel Pahlsson (9)	04:01	5–2 ANA
3rd	ANA	Corey Perry (6)	Unassisted	17:00	6–2 ANA
Penalty summary
Period	Team	Player	Penalty	Time	PIM
1st	OTT	Tom Preissing	Interference	01:40	2:00
1st	OTT	Anton Volchenkov	Hooking	03:25	2:00
1st	OTT	Jason Spezza	Holding the stick	05:39	2:00
1st	ANA	Samuel Pahlsson	Elbowing	10:14	2:00
1st	ANA	Corey Perry	Roughing	15:31	2:00
1st	ANA	Teemu Selanne	Holding	18:10	2:00
2nd	OTT	Christoph Schubert	Elbowing	16:46	2:00
3rd	OTT	Christoph Schubert	Slashing	05:48	2:00
3rd	ANA	Todd Marchant	Hooking	07:23	Penalty shot
3rd	OTT	Anton Volchenkov	Slashing	12:27	2:00

Shots by period
Team	1	2	3	Total
Ottawa	3	5	5	13
Anaheim	5	7	6	18

== Team rosters ==
Years indicated in boldface under the "Finals appearance" column signify that the player won the Stanley Cup in the given year.

=== Anaheim Ducks ===
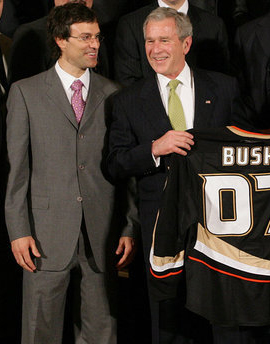
Scott Niedermayer, shown with President George W. Bush at the White House in 2008, captained the Ducks to their first Stanley Cup Final since 2003

#	Nat	Player	Position	Hand	Acquired	Place of birth	Finals appearance
30	(Russia)	Ilya Bryzgalov	G	L	2000	Tolyatti, Soviet Union	first (did not play)
35	(Canada)	Jean-Sebastien Giguere	G	L	2000–01	Montreal, Quebec	second (2003)
5	(Canada)	Ric Jackman	D	R	2006–07	Toronto, Ontario	first
21	(Canada)	Sean O'Donnell	D	L	2005–06	Ottawa, Ontario	second (2001)
23	(Canada)	Francois Beauchemin	D	L	2005–06	Sorel-Tracy, Quebec	first
25	(Canada)	Chris Pronger – **A**	D	L	2006–07	Dryden, Ontario	second (2006)
27	(Canada)	Scott Niedermayer – **C**	D	L	2005–06	Edmonton, Alberta	fifth (**1995**, **2000**, 2001, **2003**)
33	(Canada)	Joe DiPenta	D	R	2005–06	Barrie, Ontario	first
40	(Canada)	Kent Huskins	D	L	2006–07	Almonte, Ontario	first
8	(Finland)	Teemu Selanne	RW	R	2005–06	Helsinki, Finland	first
10	(Canada)	Corey Perry	RW	R	2003	Haileybury, Ontario	first
14	(Canada)	Chris Kunitz	LW	L	2005–06	Regina, Saskatchewan	first
15	(Canada)	Ryan Getzlaf	C	R	2003	Regina, Saskatchewan	first
16	(United States)	George Parros	RW	R	2006–07	Washington, Pennsylvania	first (did not play)
17	(Canada)	Dustin Penner	LW	L	2005–06	Winkler, Manitoba	first
18	(United States)	Drew Miller	LW	L	2003	Dover, New Jersey	first
19	(Canada)	Andy McDonald	C	L	2000–01	Strathroy, Ontario	first
22	(United States)	Todd Marchant	C	L	2005–06	Buffalo, New York	first
24	(Canada)	Brad May	LW	L	2006–07	Toronto, Ontario	first
26	(Sweden)	Samuel Pahlsson	C	L	2000–01	Ånge, Sweden	second (2003)
32	(Canada)	Travis Moen	LW	L	2006–07	Swift Current, Saskatchewan	first
34	(Canada)	Aaron Rome	D	L	2004	Brandon, Manitoba	first
38	(United States)	Ryan Shannon	RW/C	R	2005–06	Darien, Connecticut	first (did not play)
44	(Canada)	Rob Niedermayer – **A**	C/RW	L	2002–03	Cassiar, British Columbia	third (1996, 2003)
45	(Canada)	Shawn Thornton	RW	R	2006–07	Oshawa, Ontario	first
46	(United States)	Joe Motzko	RW	R	2006–07	Bemidji, Minnesota	first
52	(United States)	Ryan Carter	C/LW	L	2006–07	White Bear Lake, Minnesota	first

=== Ottawa Senators ===
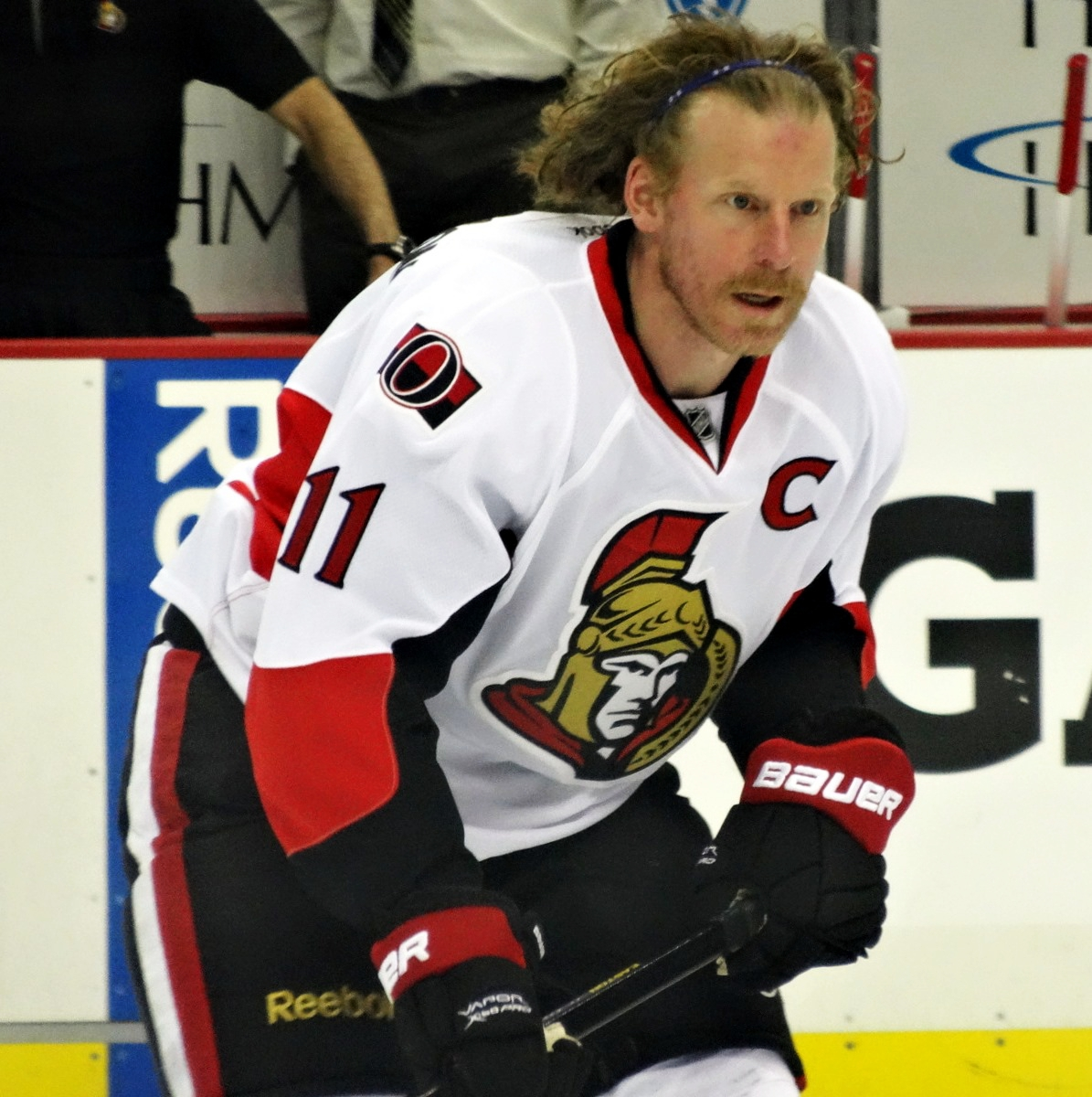
Daniel Alfredsson (pictured in 2013) captained the Senators to their first Stanley Cup Final appearance in franchise history and first for an Ottawa team since Georges Boucher captained the original Ottawa Senators to the Final in 1927.

#	Nat	Player	Position	Hand	Acquired	Place of birth	Finals appearance
1	(Canada)	Ray Emery	G	L	2001	Hamilton, Ontario	first
29	(Switzerland)	Martin Gerber	G	L	2006–07	Burgdorf, Switzerland	third (2003, **2006**) (did not play)
4	(Canada)	Chris Phillips – **A**	D	L	1996	Calgary, Alberta	first
5	(Germany)	Christoph Schubert	D	L	2001	Munich, West Germany	first
6	(Canada)	Wade Redden – **A**	D	L	1995–96	Lloydminster, Saskatchewan	first
7	(United States)	Joe Corvo	D	R	2006–07	Oak Park, Illinois	first
14	(Slovakia)	Andrej Meszaros	D	L	2004	Považská Bystrica, Czechoslovakia	first
24	(Russia)	Anton Volchenkov	D	R	2000	Moscow, Soviet Union	first
42	(United States)	Tom Preissing	D	R	2006–07	Arlington Heights, Illinois	first
11	(Sweden)	Daniel Alfredsson – **C**	RW	R	1994	Gothenburg, Sweden	first
12	(Canada)	Mike Fisher	C	R	1998	Peterborough, Ontario	first
15	(Canada)	Dany Heatley	LW	L	2005–06	Freiburg im Breisgau, West Germany	first
16	(Canada)	Brian McGrattan	RW	R	2005–06	Hamilton, Ontario	first (did not play)
19	(Canada)	Jason Spezza	C	R	2001	Mississauga, Ontario	first
20	(Canada)	Antoine Vermette	C	L	2000	Saint-Agapit, Quebec	first
22	(Canada)	Chris Kelly	LW	L	1999	Toronto, Ontario	first
25	(Canada)	Chris Neil	RW	R	1998	Flesherton, Ontario	first
27	(Canada)	Peter Schaefer	LW	L	2002–03	Yellow Grass, Saskatchewan	first
37	(Canada)	Dean McAmmond	C	L	2006–07	Grande Cache, Alberta	second (1992)
44	(Canada)	Patrick Eaves	RW	R	2003	Calgary, Alberta	first
61	(Russia)	Oleg Saprykin	LW	L	2006–07	Moscow, Soviet Union	second (2004)
89	(Canada)	Mike Comrie	C	L	2006–07	Edmonton, Alberta	first

== Stanley Cup engraving ==
The 2007 Stanley Cup was presented to Ducks captain Scott Niedermayer by NHL Commissioner Gary Bettman following the Ducks 6–2 win over the Senators in game five.

The following Ducks players and staff had their names engraved on the Stanley Cup

2006–07 Anaheim Ducks

=== Players ===
Centres

- 15 Ryan Getzlaf
- 19 Andy McDonald
- 22 Todd Marchant
- 26 Samuel Pahlsson
- 44 Rob Niedermayer* (A)
- 52 Ryan Carter*

Wingers

- 8 Teemu Selanne
- 10 Corey Perry
- 14 Chris Kunitz
- 16 George Parros ‡
- 17 Dustin Penner
- 18 Drew Miller
- 24 Brad May
- 32 Travis Moen
- 38 Ryan Shannon* †
- 45 Shawn Thornton
- 46 Joe Motzko

Defencemen

- 5 Ric Jackman
- 21 Sean O'Donnell
- 23 Francois Beauchemin
- 25 Chris Pronger (A)
- 27 Scott Niedermayer (Captain)
- 33 Joe Dipenta
- 40 Kent Huskins

Goaltenders

- 30 Ilya Bryzgalov
- 35 Jean-Sebastien Giguere
- * Played both centre and wing.
- † Did not play or dress in the Final. (Note: 1. 38 Ryan Shannon (C) was a healthy scratch for the entire Final.)
- ‡ Exemption granted to engrave the name of a player who did not automatically qualify. (Note: Automatic qualification for a player's name to be engraved on the Stanley Cup: Playing in (for a goaltender, dressing for) at least one Stanley Cup Final game or at least half of regular season games for the Stanley Cup winning team.)

=== Coaching and administrative staff ===
- Henry Samueli (Governor/Owner), Susan Samueli (Owner), Michael Schulman (Chief Executive Officer/President)
- Brian Burke (Vice President/General Manager), Tim Ryan (Vice President/Chief Operating Officer), Bob Wagner (Vice President),
- Bob Murray (Vice President-Hockey Operations), David McNab (Asst. General Manager), Al Coates (Sr. Advisor to General Manager), Randy Carlyle (Head Coach),
- Dave Farrish (Asst. Coach), Newell Brown (Asst. Coach), Francois Allaire (Goaltending Consultant), Sean Skahan (Strength-Conditioning Coach),
- Joe Trotta (Video Coordinator), Tim Clark (Trainer), Mark O'Neill (Equipment Manager), John Allaway (Assistant Equipment Manager),
- James Partida (Massage Therapist), Rick Paterson (Director of Pro Scouting), Allan Chainey (Director of Amateur Scouting)

=== Engraving notes ===
- #16 George Parros (RW) played in 32 regular season games and 5 playoff games for Anaheim. As he did not automatically qualify, Anaheim successfully requested an exemption to engrave his name. He spent the entire season with Anaheim.
- Henry and Susan Samueli last name was listed once for both owners. Also, Owners were listed once for both of them
- Four other non-players were listed with their position CEO, GM, COO, Head Coach. This was the first time since 1993–94 New York Rangers that any non-playing positions were included on the cup.
- Only 47 out of the maximum 52 names were included on the Stanley Cup in 2007.
- Four players on the roster during the Final, who were healthy scratches for the entire Final, were left off the Stanley Cup engraving due to not qualifying. Sebastien Caron and Tim Brent did not play in or dress for any playoff games.

Left off the Stanley Cup, but included in team picture

- #13 Mark Hartigan (C) – 6 regular season games for Columbus, 6 for Anaheim, and 1 playoff game for Anaheim
- #34 Aaron Rome (D) – 1 regular season game and 1 playoff game
- #29 Sebastien Caron (G) – 1 regular season game
- The NHL denied Anaheim's request to include Hartigan and Rome on the Stanley Cup, as they spent the majority of the season in the minors, and did not play in the last two rounds. Anaheim did not request an exemption for Caron to have his name engraved.

Left off the Stanley Cup, and not in team picture

- #47 Tim Brent (C) – 15 regular season games. Anaheim did not request an exemption to engrave his name.

== Television and ratings ==
The 2007 Stanley Cup Final was also notable for its exceptionally poor television ratings in the United States. Games one and two were carried by cable channel Versus, then a new and little known player on the sports television scene. Game one produced a 0.5 national rating or 523,000 households. It was the 58th best rated program of that day. Game two produced a 0.4 national rating or 446,000 households, the 74th best rated program of that day, lower than the 2006 WNBA All-Star Game on ESPN which drew 447,000 households.

The move to NBC for the remainder of the finals did little to compensate for the series' limited drawing power. A perennial last among the Big Four American television networks, NBC was at the time going through an intense period of ratings turmoil, setting lowest rated week records in several viewing categories over the course of spring 2007.

Game three's coverage on NBC garnered a mere 1.1 rating (approximately 1,205,600 households), making it the lowest rated prime-time broadcast in the network's history. For comparison, game six of the NBA Eastern Conference Finals, broadcast opposite game three on cable channel TNT, achieved a 5.3 rating, approximately 5,808,800 households. Game four achieved a 1.9 rating (approximately 2,082,400 households), down 5 percent from game four the previous year. Game five received slightly less, 1.8 (approximately 1,972,800 households). As a whole, NBC's ratings for the championship series were down 20 percent from the previous season, making it the least watched finals in the United States.

At the time, Versus was only available to 50 percent of cable-equipped homes in the Los Angeles area, which hurt the buzz around the Ducks' playoff run in a traditionally crowded sports and entertainment market. Versus was the fifth-most watched cable network in the Los Angeles market for game one, good only for a 1.7 local rating.

Local numbers did improve as the series moved to free-to-air NBC. The Cup-clinching game five drew a 6.0 and a 12 share for an average audience of 496,000 viewers in the Los Angeles market, more than double that of a high-profile regular season game between baseball's Los Angeles Dodgers and San Diego Padres on KCAL 9 (3.0/5, 218,000 viewers). This symbolic, if short-lived, win over one of the region's flagship teams allowed the Ducks to close the series on a relatively high note, with the Los Angeles Times' Larry Stewart calling their final ratings performance "pretty good".

On the CBC, Hockey Night in Canada pulled in 2,608,000, 2,378,000, and 2,553,000 viewers for games one, two and three respectively, slightly higher than their numbers for equivalent games the previous year. This was the last finals that play-by-play announcer Bob Cole and colour commentator Harry Neale worked together. The following year, Cole worked with Greg Millen, who joined them for this year's final.

== See also ==
- 2007 in ice hockey
- 2006–07 Anaheim Ducks season
- 2006–07 Ottawa Senators season

== Notes ==
Preceded by Carolina Hurricanes; 2006	Anaheim Ducks; Stanley Cup champions 2007	Succeeded by Detroit Red Wings; 2008
