= Travis Moen =

Canadian ice hockey player (born 1982)

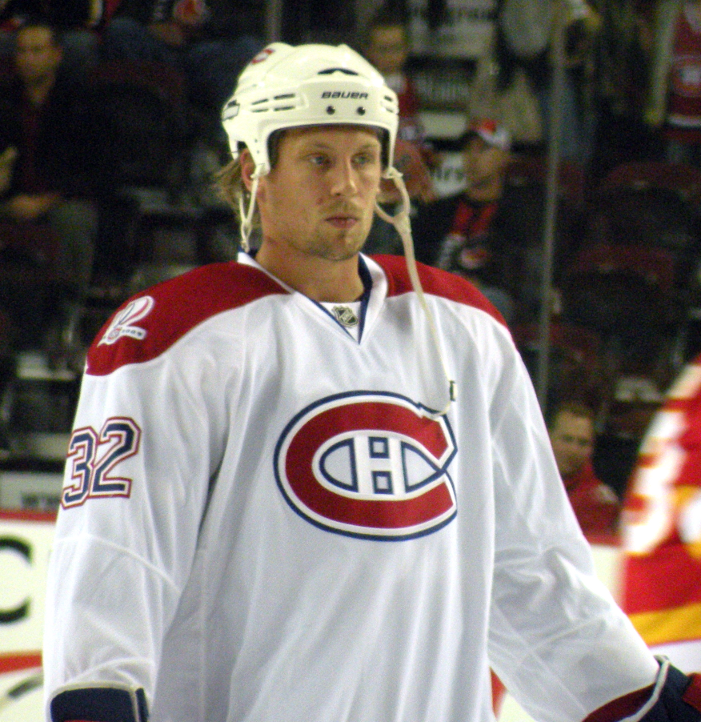
- Moen with the Montreal Canadiens in 2009
- Born: April 6, 1982 (age 44) Swift Current, Saskatchewan, Canada
- Height: 6 ft 2 in (188 cm)
- Weight: 210 lb (95 kg; 15 st 0 lb)
- Position: Left wing
- Shot: Left
- Played for: Chicago Blackhawks; Anaheim Ducks; San Jose Sharks; Montreal Canadiens; Dallas Stars
- NHL draft: 155th overall, 2000; Calgary Flames
- Playing career: 2002–2016

Travis Shawn Moen (born April 6, 1982) is a Canadian former professional ice hockey winger. He was selected in the fifth round, 155th overall, by the Calgary Flames of the National Hockey League (NHL) in the 2000 NHL entry draft and previously played for the Chicago Blackhawks, Anaheim Ducks, with whom he won the Stanley Cup in 2007, San Jose Sharks, Montreal Canadiens, and Dallas Stars.

== Playing career ==
=== Junior ===
Moen joined the Kelowna Rockets of the Western Hockey League (WHL) as a list player in the 1998-99 season playing four games, before spending three full seasons with the team from 1999–2002. His final season was his best in a Rockets uniform, as Moen registered 27 points along with nearly 200 penalty minutes.

=== Professional ===
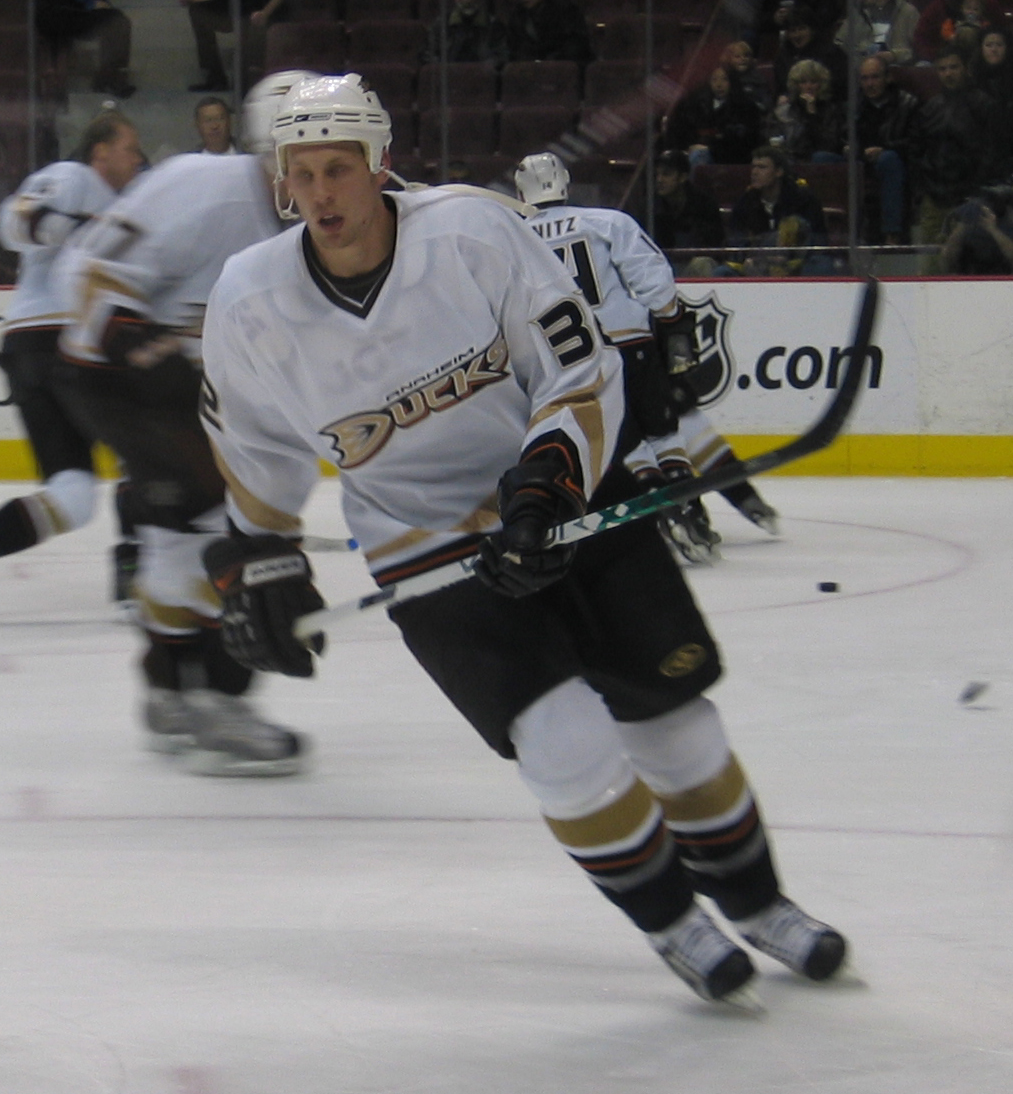
Moen as a member of the Anaheim Ducks

Moen was drafted in the fifth round, 155th overall in the 2000 NHL entry draft by the Calgary Flames, but was never signed to a contract by the Flames and remained in the WHL. As an unrestricted free agent, Moen was signed by the Chicago Blackhawks in 2002. The Blackhawks assigned him to play for their then-American Hockey League (AHL) affiliate, the Norfolk Admirals, for the 2002–03 season.

Moen managed to make the Blackhawks in 2003–04 and played all 82 games that season. The year after, he played for the Admirals due to the 2004–05 NHL lockout.

Before the 2005–06 season, Moen was traded to the Mighty Ducks of Anaheim in exchange for Mikael Holmqvist on July 30, 2005. He played 39 games for the Mighty Ducks that season, and appeared in his first Stanley Cup playoff game, also scoring his first playoff goal in a game against the Colorado Avalanche on May 5, 2006.

In the 2006–07 season, Moen played on the Ducks' third line with Frank J. Selke Trophy candidate Samuel Påhlsson and Rob Niedermayer, the only line that head coach Randy Carlyle did not change throughout the course of the season. Moen also scored his first multigoal game of his career in a game against the Edmonton Oilers, where he scored two goals.

The Ducks qualified for the 2007 playoffs, and in the Western Conference semifinals, Moen scored the game-winning goal in overtime in game four against the Vancouver Canucks to give Anaheim a 3–1 series lead. Moen then scored another game-winning goal in game one of the 2007 Stanley Cup Final against the Ottawa Senators. He was also credited with the Cup-winning goal in game five to win his first Stanley Cup. The goal was actually an own goal by Senators defenceman Chris Phillips. However, since Moen was the last Ducks player to touch the puck, he was credited with the goal.

Moen was traded to the San Jose Sharks on March 4, 2009, along with Kent Huskins in exchange for Nick Bonino, Timo Pielmeier and a fourth-round draft pick in 2011.

On July 10, 2009, Moen signed a three-year contract worth $1.5 million per season as a free agent with the Montreal Canadiens. During the 2010–11 season, Moen skated in his 500th career NHL game on February 15, 2011 versus the Buffalo Sabres.

On June 29, 2012, Moen signed a four-year, $7.2 million contract extension with the Canadiens, averaging $1.8 million a year.

On November 11, 2014, Moen was traded to the Dallas Stars in exchange for defenceman Sergei Gonchar. He played in his 700th career NHL game a few weeks later against his former team, Montreal, on December 6. After appearing in just 23 games during the 2015–16 season, Moen announced his retirement in late November 2016.

== Personal life ==
During the off-season whilst with the Anaheim Ducks, Moen worked on his family's 3,500-acre (14 km^{2}) farm in his hometown of Stewart Valley, Saskatchewan.

In April 2008, Moen made a cameo, along with the Stanley Cup, in the episode "Bed and Brake Fast" of the Canadian television sitcom Corner Gas.

== Career statistics ==
			Regular season					Playoffs
Season	Team	League	GP	G	A	Pts	PIM	GP	G	A	Pts	PIM
1998–99	Swift Current Legionnaires AAA	SMHL	44	18	22	40	68	—	—	—	—	—
1998–99	Kelowna Rockets	WHL	4	0	0	0	0	—	—	—	—	—
1999–2000	Kelowna Rockets	WHL	66	9	6	15	96	5	1	1	2	2
2000–01	Kelowna Rockets	WHL	40	8	8	16	106	—	—	—	—	—
2001–02	Kelowna Rockets	WHL	71	10	17	27	197	13	1	0	1	28
2002–03	Norfolk Admirals	AHL	42	1	2	3	62	9	0	0	0	20
2003–04	Chicago Blackhawks	NHL	82	4	2	6	142	—	—	—	—	—
2004–05	Norfolk Admirals	AHL	79	8	12	20	187	6	0	1	1	6
2005–06	Mighty Ducks of Anaheim	NHL	39	4	1	5	72	9	1	0	1	10
2006–07	Anaheim Ducks	NHL	82	11	10	21	101	21	7	5	12	22
2007–08	Anaheim Ducks	NHL	77	3	5	8	81	6	1	1	2	2
2008–09	Anaheim Ducks	NHL	63	4	7	11	77	—	—	—	—	—
2008–09	San Jose Sharks	NHL	19	3	2	5	14	6	0	0	0	2
2009–10	Montreal Canadiens	NHL	81	8	11	19	57	9	2	1	3	4
2010–11	Montreal Canadiens	NHL	79	6	10	16	96	7	0	1	1	2
2011–12	Montreal Canadiens	NHL	48	9	7	16	41	—	—	—	—	—
2012–13	Montreal Canadiens	NHL	45	2	4	6	32	5	0	0	0	17
2013–14	Montreal Canadiens	NHL	65	2	10	12	49	4	0	0	0	0
2014–15	Montreal Canadiens	NHL	10	0	0	0	4	—	—	—	—	—
2014–15	Dallas Stars	NHL	34	3	6	9	14	—	—	—	—	—
2015–16	Dallas Stars	NHL	23	0	2	2	21	6	0	0	0	2
NHL totals			747	59	77	136	801	83	11	8	19	61

== Awards and honours ==
Award	Year	Ref
NHL
Stanley Cup champion	2007	
