= Samuel Påhlsson =

Swedish ice hockey player (born 1977)

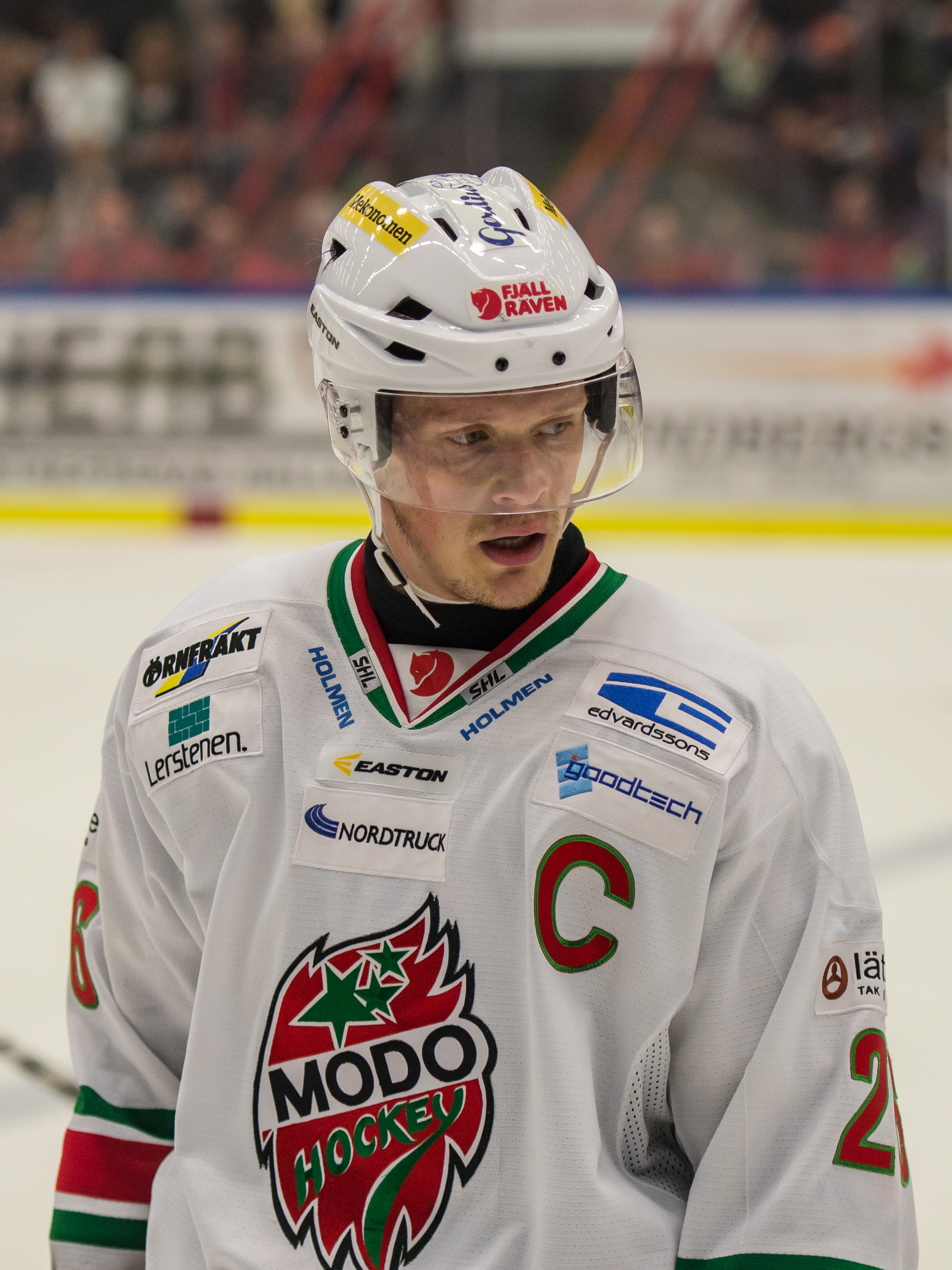
- Påhlsson with Modo Hockey in 2013
- Born: December 17, 1977 (age 48) Ånge, Sweden
- Height: 6 ft 0 in (183 cm)
- Weight: 202 lb (92 kg; 14 st 6 lb)
- Position: Centre
- Shot: Left
- Played for: Modo Hockey; Boston Bruins; Anaheim Ducks; Chicago Blackhawks; Columbus Blue Jackets; Vancouver Canucks
- National team: Sweden
- NHL draft: 176th overall, 1996; Colorado Avalanche
- Playing career: 1995–2015

Samuel Olof Påhlsson (/ˈpɔːlsən/; born December 17, 1977) is a Swedish former professional ice hockey player who last played with Modo Hockey of the Swedish Hockey League (SHL). Påhlsson spent the majority of his playing career in the National Hockey League (NHL) with the Boston Bruins, Anaheim Ducks, Chicago Blackhawks, Columbus Blue Jackets and Vancouver Canucks. He was originally drafted 176th overall by the Colorado Avalanche at the 1996 NHL entry draft, though he never played for the team.

Påhlsson won an Olympic gold medal with Sweden at the 2006 Winter Olympics in Turin, as well as a Stanley Cup the following season with Anaheim in 2007.

== Playing career ==
=== Sweden ===
After a stint with a fourth-tier men's league based out of his hometown of Ånge, Påhlsson joined the Modo Hockey organization in 1994–95, debuting in one Elitserien game. The following season, he split his time between Modo's Elitserien and junior teams. After recording 21 points over 30 junior games and 4 points over 36 Elitserien contests, Påhlsson was selected by the Colorado Avalanche, 176th overall, in the 1996 NHL entry draft. Following his draft, he remained in Sweden for four more years before moving to North America to begin his NHL career. Joining Modo's Elitserien team full-time in 1996–97, he improved to 17 points over 49 games. Two seasons later, he recorded an Elitserien career-high 17 goals, 17 assists and 34 points over 50 games. During his tenure with Modo, he played alongside Daniel and Henrik Sedin, who went on to become his NHL teammates in with the Vancouver Canucks in 2012.

=== NHL ===
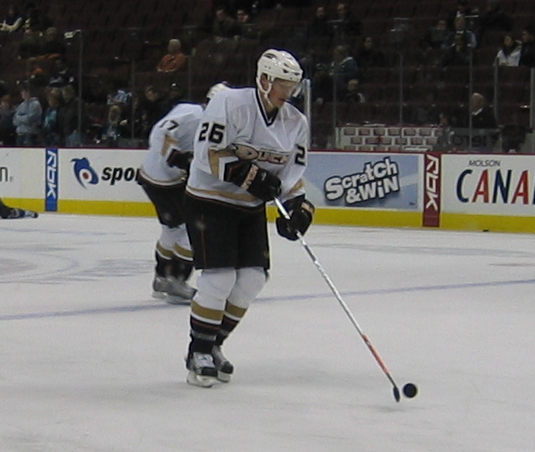
Påhlsson with the Anaheim Ducks skates in a pre-game warm-up during the 2006–07 season

Following the 1999–2000 season, Påhlsson's NHL rights were traded from the Avalanche to the Boston Bruins on March 6, 2000. He was sent to Boston, along with Brian Rolston, Martin Grenier and a first-round pick in the 2000 NHL entry draft, in exchange for Dave Andreychuk and Ray Bourque. Påhlsson joined the Bruins for the 2000–01 season and played 17 games with the team before being traded once again on November 18, 2000, to the Mighty Ducks of Anaheim in exchange for Andrei Nazarov and Patrick Traverse. Påhlsson completed his NHL rookie campaign with nine points over 76 games.

The 2002–03 season brought Påhlsson and the Mighty Ducks to the Stanley Cup Final, though they were defeated in seven games by the New Jersey Devils.

During the 2004–05 NHL lockout, Påhlsson returned to Sweden to play for Frölunda HC, helping the team to an Elitserien championship. With 11 points over 14 post-season games, Påhlsson was named to the Playoff All-Star Team. With Frölunda, he played on a line with fellow NHL players P. J. Axelsson and Daniel Alfredsson.

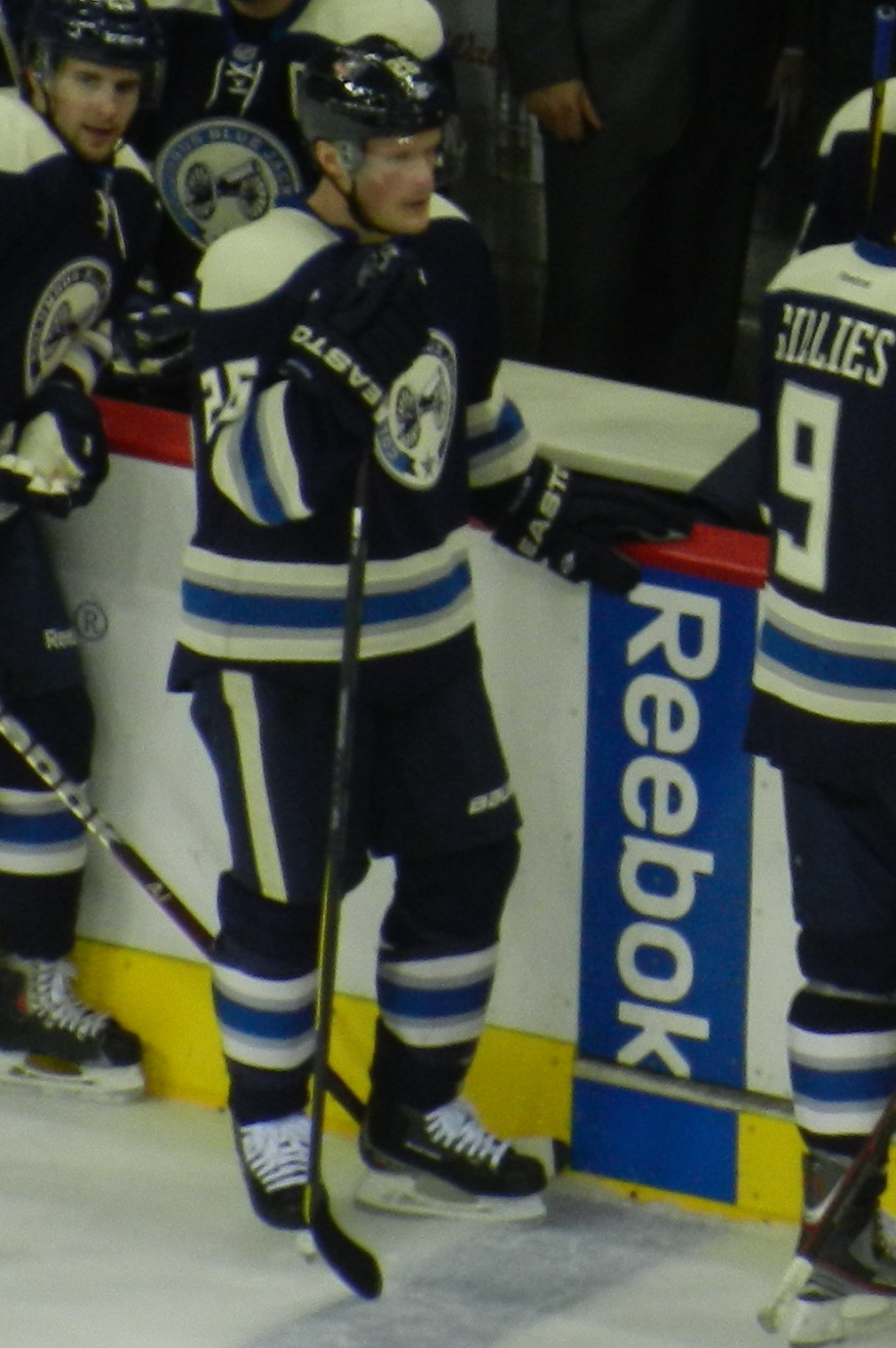
Påhlsson with the Blue Jackets during the 2011–12 season

Påhlsson returned to the Ducks the next year in the 2005–06 season, where the team advanced to the Conference Final, being defeated by the Edmonton Oilers. In the 2006–07 season, Anaheim returned to the Stanley Cup Final. Since their last trip to the Finals, the Ducks' roster had changed significantly, though Påhlsson was one of the few remaining players from 2003. He was primarily utilized on the Ducks' checking line alongside Travis Moen and Rob Niedermayer. Påhlsson's efforts in a defensive role were instrumental in Anaheim's successful season; he helped the Ducks defeat the Ottawa Senators in five games to win his and the Ducks' first Stanley Cup. He totalled 12 points over 21 games in the playoffs, including the winning goal in game two of the Finals. He was nominated for the Frank J. Selke Trophy as the NHL's best defensive forward during the regular season, ultimately losing out to defending champion Rod Brind'Amour of the Carolina Hurricanes.

In the last year of his contract in 2008–09, Påhlsson was dealt at the NHL trade deadline on March 4, 2009, along with Logan Stephenson, to the Chicago Blackhawks in exchange for James Wisniewski and Petri Kontiola. Påhlsson advanced to the Western Conference Final with the Blackhawks, where they were eliminated by the Detroit Red Wings. Becoming an unrestricted free agent in the off-season, Påhlsson signed a three-year contract worth an annual average value of $2.65 million with the Columbus Blue Jackets on July 1, 2009.

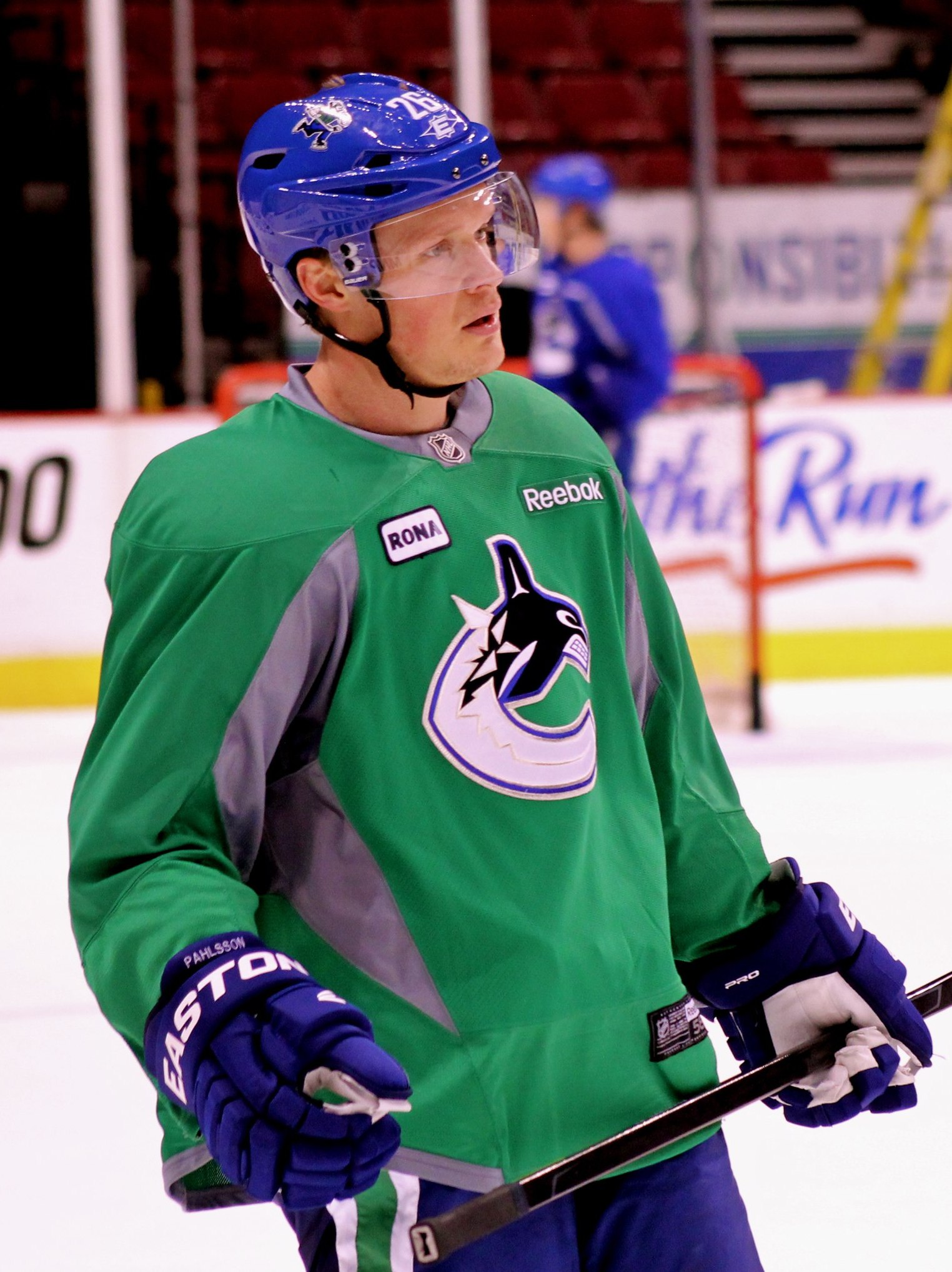
Påhlsson during a Canucks practice in 2012

In a similar scenario to his trade from the Ducks three years prior, Påhlsson was once again traded for the last season of his contract on February 27, 2012. He was sent to the Vancouver Canucks for defenceman Taylor Ellington and two fourth-round draft picks in 2012. Påhlsson scored his first goal as a Canuck on March 8, a game-winner against the Winnipeg Jets.

=== Return to Sweden ===
On June 18, 2012, in advance of the NHL's free agency period, Påhlsson ended his North American career to return to Sweden and signed a three-year contract to captain his original club, Modo Hockey. Upon his return to Modo, after enjoying a primarily healthy career in the NHL, Påhlsson tore his Achilles tendon, which limited him to 23 injury-affected games in the 2012–13 season. Påhlsson captained Modo in his first two seasons before becoming alternate captain in his final professional season in 2014–15. He added 14 points in 53 games before ending his professional career on April 16, 2015.

== International play ==
Medal record

Representing Sweden

Ice hockey

Olympic Games
Gold medal – first place	2006 Turin	

World Championships
Silver medal – second place	2004 Czech Republic	
Bronze medal – third place	1999 Norway	

World Junior Championships
Silver medal – second place	1996 United States	

European Junior Championship
Bronze medal – third place	1995 Germany	

In 2005–06, Påhlsson played for the Swedish Olympic team at the Winter Olympics in Turin, where he won the gold medal, playing the final games with his old line mates from the year before in Frölunda.

== Career statistics ==
=== Regular season and playoffs ===
			Regular season					Playoffs
Season	Team	League	GP	G	A	Pts	PIM	GP	G	A	Pts	PIM
1994–95	Modo Hockey	J20	30	10	11	21	26	—	—	—	—	—
1994–95	Modo Hockey	SEL	36	1	3	4	8	4	0	0	0	0
1995–96	Modo Hockey	J20	5	2	6	8	2	—	—	—	—	—
1995–96	Modo Hockey	SEL	36	1	3	4	8	4	0	0	0	0
1996–97	Modo Hockey	SEL	49	8	9	17	83	—	—	—	—	—
1997–98	Modo Hockey	SEL	23	6	11	17	24	9	3	0	3	6
1998–99	Modo Hockey	SEL	50	17	17	34	44	13	3	3	6	10
1999–2000	Modo Hockey	SEL	47	16	11	27	67	13	3	3	6	8
2000–01	Boston Bruins	NHL	17	1	1	2	6	—	—	—	—	—
2000–01	Mighty Ducks of Anaheim	NHL	59	3	4	7	14	—	—	—	—	—
2001–02	Mighty Ducks of Anaheim	NHL	80	6	14	20	26	—	—	—	—	—
2002–03	Cincinnati Mighty Ducks	AHL	13	1	7	8	24	—	—	—	—	—
2002–03	Mighty Ducks of Anaheim	NHL	34	4	11	15	18	21	2	4	6	12
2003–04	Mighty Ducks of Anaheim	NHL	82	8	14	22	52	—	—	—	—	—
2004–05	Frölunda HC	SEL	48	6	18	24	56	14	4	7	11	24
2005–06	Mighty Ducks of Anaheim	NHL	82	11	10	21	34	16	2	3	5	18
2006–07	Anaheim Ducks	NHL	82	8	18	26	42	21	3	9	12	20
2007–08	Anaheim Ducks	NHL	56	6	9	15	34	6	0	0	0	0
2008–09	Anaheim Ducks	NHL	52	5	10	15	32	—	—	—	—	—
2008–09	Chicago Blackhawks	NHL	13	2	1	3	2	17	2	3	5	4
2009–10	Columbus Blue Jackets	NHL	79	3	13	16	32	—	—	—	—	—
2010–11	Columbus Blue Jackets	NHL	82	7	13	20	30	—	—	—	—	—
2011–12	Columbus Blue Jackets	NHL	61	2	9	11	22	—	—	—	—	—
2011–12	Vancouver Canucks	NHL	19	2	4	6	12	5	1	0	1	4
2012–13	Modo Hockey	SEL	23	0	4	4	8	5	0	0	0	12
2013–14	Modo Hockey	SHL	55	10	9	19	40	2	0	1	1	0
2014–15	Modo Hockey	SHL	53	4	10	14	28	—	—	—	—	—
SEL/SHL totals			384	67	92	159	378	64	14	15	29	64
NHL totals			798	68	131	199	356	86	10	19	29	58

=== International ===
Year	Team	Event	Result	GP	G	A	Pts	PIM
1995	Sweden	EJC18	3rd place, bronze medalist(s)	5	1	4	5	2
1996	Sweden	WJC	2nd place, silver medalist(s)	7	0	0	0	0
1999	Sweden	WC	3rd place, bronze medalist(s)	10	1	3	4	4
2000	Sweden	WC	7th	7	0	0	0	4
2004	Sweden	WCH	5th	4	0	0	0	6
2004	Sweden	WC	2nd place, silver medalist(s)	9	1	3	4	8
2005	Sweden	WC	4th	9	2	5	7	28
2006	Sweden	OG	1st place, gold medalist(s)	8	2	2	4	8
2010	Sweden	OG	5th	3	0	1	1	2
Junior totals				12	1	4	5	2
Senior totals				50	6	14	20	60

== Awards and honours ==
Award	Year
SHL
Junior Player of the Year	1997
Le Mat Trophy	2005
All-Star Team	2005
NHL
Stanley Cup	2007
