= Michael Shulman =

Michael Shulman may refer to:

- Michael Shulman (actor), American film, stage, and television actor
- Michael Shulman (writer) (born 1973), American writer
- Michael Shulman (mathematician), associate professor of mathematics at the University of San Diego

== See also ==
- Michael Schulman, American sports executive
