= Andy McDonald (ice hockey) =

Canadian ice hockey player (born 1977)

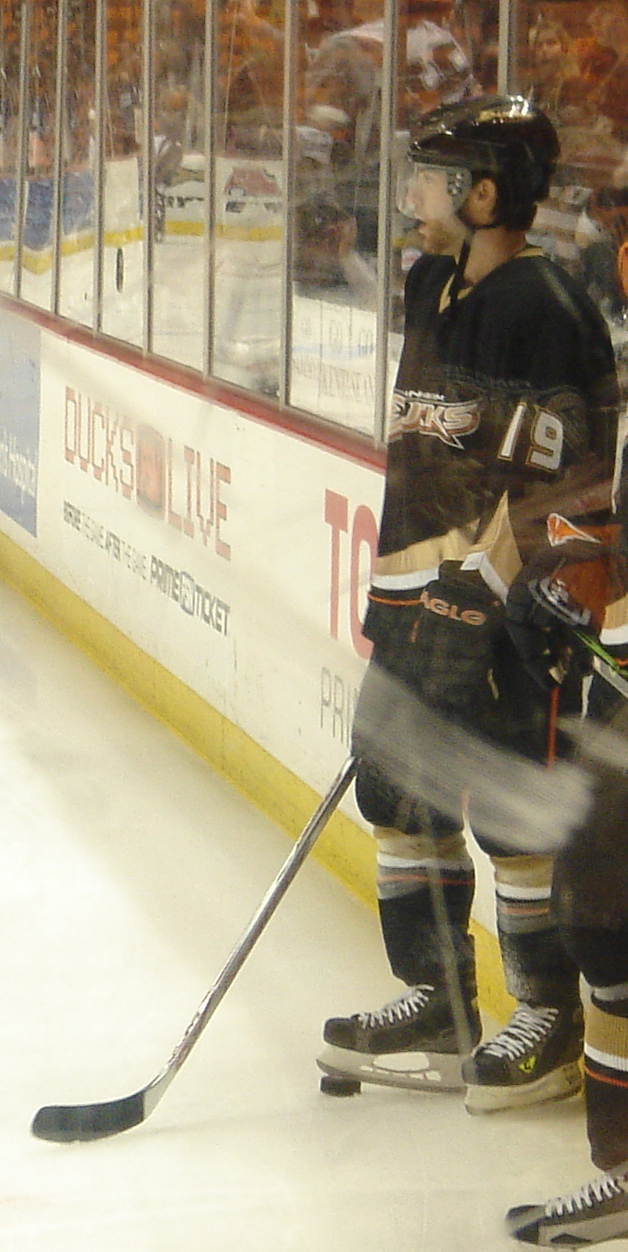
- McDonald with the Anaheim Ducks in 2007
- Born: August 25, 1977 (age 49) Strathroy, Ontario, Canada
- Height: 5 ft 10 in (178 cm)
- Weight: 175 lb (79 kg; 12 st 7 lb)
- Position: Left wing/Centre
- Shot: Left
- Played for: Anaheim Ducks; St. Louis Blues
- National team: Canada
- NHL draft: Undrafted
- Playing career: 2000–2013

Andy McDonald (born August 25, 1977) is a Canadian former professional ice hockey player. He played for the Anaheim Ducks and the St. Louis Blues of the National Hockey League (NHL), winning the Stanley Cup with Anaheim in 2007.

== Playing career ==
=== Amateur ===
McDonald was first coached by his father, who originally had him play defence, but moved him to forward when it became evident he would be too small to make a career as a defenceman. He played in the Strathroy & District Minor Hockey Association and moved onto the Elgin-Middlesex Chiefs AAA team.

Andy played Junior B hockey for the Strathroy Rockets. In 1994–1995, he was named the Rockets Most Valuable Player and had the best plus-minus as a forward. From the OHA he received Eastern Division MVP, League MVP, and the OHA Player of the Year. In 1995–1996, he again had the best plus-minus as a forward, was Rocket Player of the Year, MVP, and Playoff MVP. He also received the Eastern Division MVP, League MVP, and League Player of the Year that season. In the playoffs Andy scored the game-winning goal in overtime of game six against the Aylmer Aces that gave the Rockets a huge upset win and their first playoff series win in 19 years.

After being spotted playing in the Western Ontario Junior Hockey League by Stan Moore and Chris Wells, Andy spent four years with a full scholarship at Colgate University alongside fellow Strathroy native Darryl Campbell, the older brother of NHL defenseman Brian Campbell. He led the Division I Red Raiders, culminating his career there with an ECAC scoring championship, being named the ECAC Player of the Year, being selected for the ECAC All-Star Team and was a finalist for the coveted Hobey Baker Award and an All-American. He graduated with a degree in International Relations.

=== Professional (2000–2013) ===
==== Anaheim Ducks (2000–2007) ====
He went undrafted and was signed as a free agent by Anaheim in 2000. On November 12, 2000, McDonald made his NHL debut in a 3–2 loss to the Detroit Red Wings and he eventually scored his first NHL goal in a 4–0 win over the Los Angeles Kings against Kings' goaltender Jamie Storr on December 3.

McDonald represented Team Canada at the 2002 World Championships in Sweden, where he led the team in goals and points.

Concussion problems plagued his first three seasons with the Ducks, and he was forced to sit and watch when the team made a run at the Stanley Cup in 2003 (after playing 46 games for the Ducks in the 2002–03 season, where the Ducks would lose in seven games to the New Jersey Devils, one win short form winning the Stanley Cup.

McDonald spent the 2004–05 lockout season playing overseas in the Deutsche Eishockey Liga with team ERC Ingolstadt, along with fellow NHLers Marco Sturm, Jamie Langenbrunner, and Aaron Ward.

On January 19, 2007, McDonald was selected to play in his first NHL All-Star game, replacing Detroit Red Wings forward Henrik Zetterberg who was injured. During the skills competition, McDonald won the fastest skater challenge, finishing with a time of 14.03 seconds (Dylan Larkin holds the record of 13.172). On June 4, during game four of the Stanley Cup Finals against the Ottawa Senators, McDonald contributed on all three of the Ducks goals, scoring two goals and an assist, en route to a 3–2 victory. McDonald was named the first star of the game on the official scoresheet. He finished with five goals in the series as the Ducks won the Stanley Cup in five games.

==== St. Louis Blues (2007–2013) ====
On December 14, 2007, in order for the Anaheim Ducks to free up salary cap space for Scott Niedermayer, McDonald was traded to the St. Louis Blues for Doug Weight.

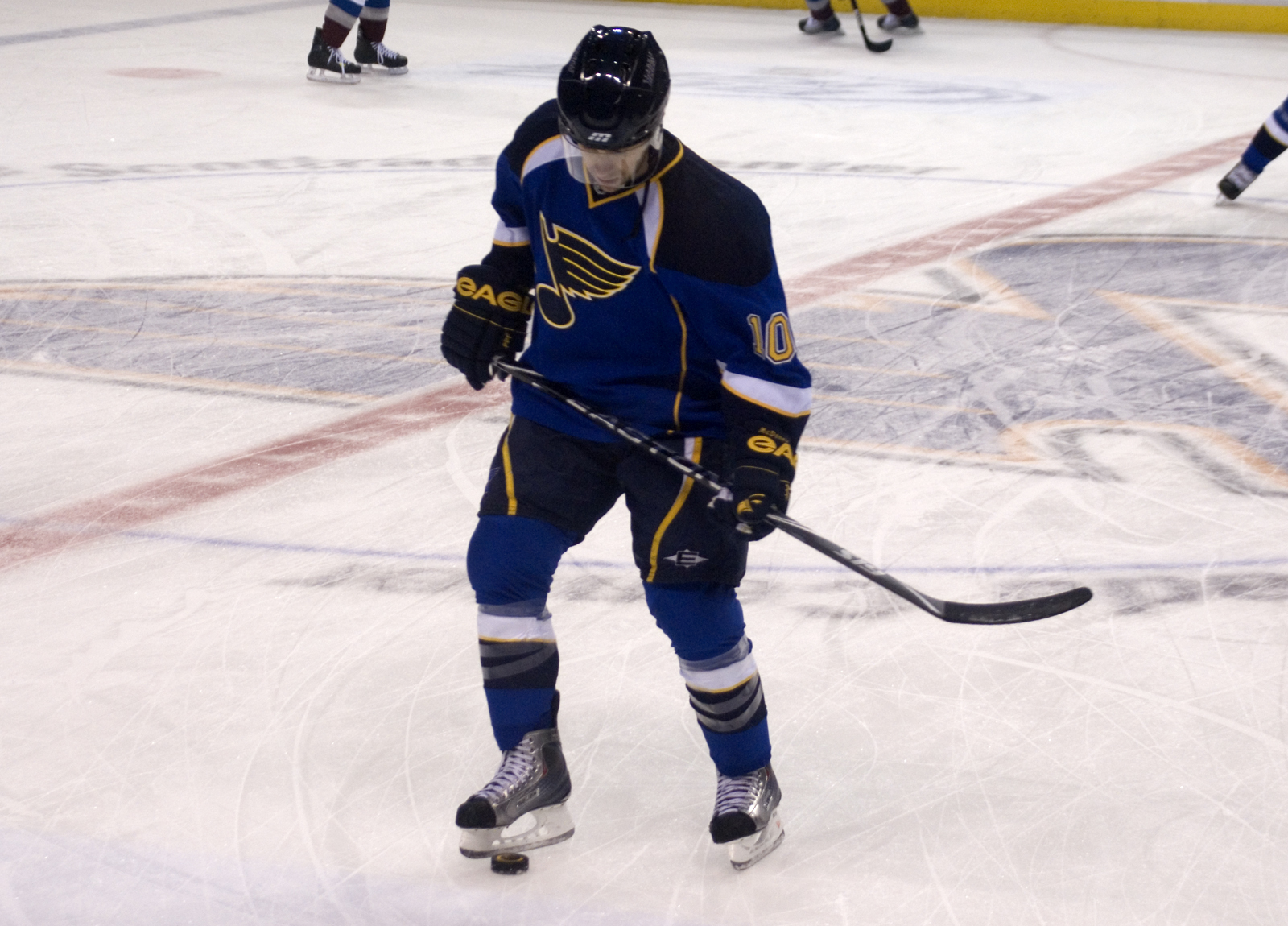
McDonald in February 2011 during his tenure with the St. Louis Blues

McDonald fractured his leg in a game against the Montreal Canadiens on November 16, 2008. Despite this McDonald later returned and February 10, 2009, in a 6–4 loss to the Vancouver Canucks and scoring a goal on Canucks' goaltender Roberto Luongo and recording an assist on a Steven Wagner goal, he signed a four-year extension with the Blues. McDonald would finish the 2008–09 season with 15 goals and 29 assists for 24 points in 46 games while the Blues as a team would finish the season as the sixth seed in the Western Conference to earn a spot in the 2009 playoffs, marking the first time since 2004 where the Blues clinched a playoff spot, where they would be swept in the first round by the third-seeded Vancouver Canucks.

On November 10, 2009, McDonald played in his 500th NHL game in a 6–1 victory over the Vancouver Canucks and recorded a goal on Canucks' goaltender Andrew Raycroft and recorded two assists on goals by David Perron and Brad Boyes, respectively. Despite the Blues struggling as a team throughout the 2009–10 season and not qualifying for the 2010 playoffs, MacDonald enjoyed a healthy bounce back season having ended the campaign with 24 goals and 33 assists for 57 points in 79 games played.

On November 30, 2010, in a 7–5 loss to the Chicago Blackhawks, McDonald was the subject of a controversial boarding incident on Blackhawks' forward Viktor Stålberg towards the end of the game and was given a minor penalty for the play but ultimately was not suspended and/or fined by the NHL most likely due McDonald not having a suspension history and Stålberg being able to get back on his feet on his own power having not been injured on the play despite being in discomfort. On December 4, McDonald suffered a concussion in a 2–1 overtime loss to the Edmonton Oilers having suffered the injury in the overtime period after colliding with Oilers' forward Shawn Horcoff. After missing almost nine weeks of action and 24 games, he then returned to the Blues' lineup on February 4, 2011, in a 5–3 win over the Edmonton Oilers and recording an assist in the game on a goal by Alex Pietrangelo. McDonald finished an injury-marred 2010–11 season with 20 goals and 30 assists for 50 points in 58 games as the Blues as a team continued to struggle as a team and failing to qualify for a spot in the 2011 playoffs as they came 10 points out of the last playoff spot.

On October 13, 2011, just three games into the 2011–12 season, McDonald would suffer another concussion in a 3–2 loss to the Dallas Stars, causing him to miss the next 51 games until his eventual return to the lineup on February 12, 2012, in a 3–0 win over the San Jose Sharks recording an assist in the game on an Alex Pietrangelo goal. He ended another injury-riddled season playing in only 25 games with 10 goals and 12 assists for 22 points. Despite being sidelined for most of the season, the Blues performed well as a team as they finished the season as the second seed in the Western Conference to qualify for the playoffs for the first time since 2009. McDonald and the Blues would face the San Jose Sharks in the opening round of the 2012 playoffs where they would defeat the seventh-seeded Sharks in five games before the Blues eventually got swept in the second round by the eighth-seeded and eventual Stanley Cup champion Los Angeles Kings. McDonald would end the playoffs with five goals and assists for 10 points in all nine games.

McDonald played 37 games in the lockout-shortened 2012–13 season with seven goals and 14 assists for 21 points as the Blues continued to be a successful team having finished the shortened season as the fourth seed in the West. Their success, however, could not be replicated in the opening round of the 2013 playoffs as McDonald and the Blues would be upset in the series in six games by the defending Stanley Cup champion and fifth-seeded Los Angeles Kings with McDonald being held pointless in all six games.

McDonald announced his retirement on June 6, 2013, citing concussion issues in his early years in the NHL as the main reason for his decision.

== Personal ==
McDonald and his wife Gina have two children together, a son and a daughter.

== Career statistics ==
=== Regular season and playoffs ===
			Regular season					Playoffs
Season	Team	League	GP	G	A	Pts	PIM	GP	G	A	Pts	PIM
1993–94	Strathroy Blades	WOHL	7	2	2	4	0	—	—	—	—	—
1994–95	Strathroy Rockets	WOHL	50	32	41	73	24	—	—	—	—	—
1995–96	Strathroy Rockets	WOHL	52	31	56	87	103	—	—	—	—	—
1996–97	Colgate Red Raiders	ECAC	33	9	10	19	16	—	—	—	—	—
1997–98	Colgate Red Raiders	ECAC	35	13	19	32	26	—	—	—	—	—
1998–99	Colgate Red Raiders	ECAC	35	20	26	46	42	—	—	—	—	—
1999–2000	Colgate Red Raiders	ECAC	34	25	33	58	49	—	—	—	—	—
2000–01	Mighty Ducks of Anaheim	NHL	16	1	0	1	6	—	—	—	—	—
2000–01	Cincinnati Mighty Ducks	AHL	46	15	25	40	21	3	0	1	1	2
2001–02	Mighty Ducks of Anaheim	NHL	53	7	21	28	10	—	—	—	—	—
2001–02	Cincinnati Mighty Ducks	AHL	21	7	25	32	6	—	—	—	—	—
2002–03	Mighty Ducks of Anaheim	NHL	46	10	11	21	14	—	—	—	—	—
2003–04	Mighty Ducks of Anaheim	NHL	79	9	21	30	24	—	—	—	—	—
2004–05	ERC Ingolstadt	DEL	36	13	17	30	26	10	5	2	7	35
2005–06	Mighty Ducks of Anaheim	NHL	82	34	51	85	32	16	2	7	9	10
2006–07	Anaheim Ducks	NHL	82	27	51	78	46	21	10	4	14	10
2007–08	Anaheim Ducks	NHL	33	4	12	16	30	—	—	—	—	—
2007–08	St. Louis Blues	NHL	49	14	22	36	32	—	—	—	—	—
2008–09	St. Louis Blues	NHL	46	15	29	44	24	4	1	3	4	0
2009–10	St. Louis Blues	NHL	79	24	33	57	18	—	—	—	—	—
2010–11	St. Louis Blues	NHL	58	20	30	50	26	—	—	—	—	—
2011–12	St. Louis Blues	NHL	25	10	12	22	2	9	5	5	10	8
2012–13	St. Louis Blues	NHL	37	7	14	21	16	6	0	0	0	0
NHL totals			685	182	307	489	280	56	18	19	37	28

=== International ===
Year	Team	Event	Result	GP	G	A	Pts	PIM
2002	Canada	WC	6th	7	4	1	5	0
Senior totals				7	4	1	5	0

== Awards and honours ==
Award	Year
NCAA
All-ECAC Hockey Second team	1998–99
All-ECAC Hockey First Team	1999–00
ECAC Player of the Year	2000
AHCA East First-Team All-American	2000
NHL
All-Star Skills Fastest Skater	2007
Stanley Cup	2007

Awards and achievements
Preceded by Eric Heffler	ECAC Hockey Player of the Year; 1999–00	Succeeded by Erik Anderson
