= Sean O'Donnell =

Canadian ice hockey player (born 1971)

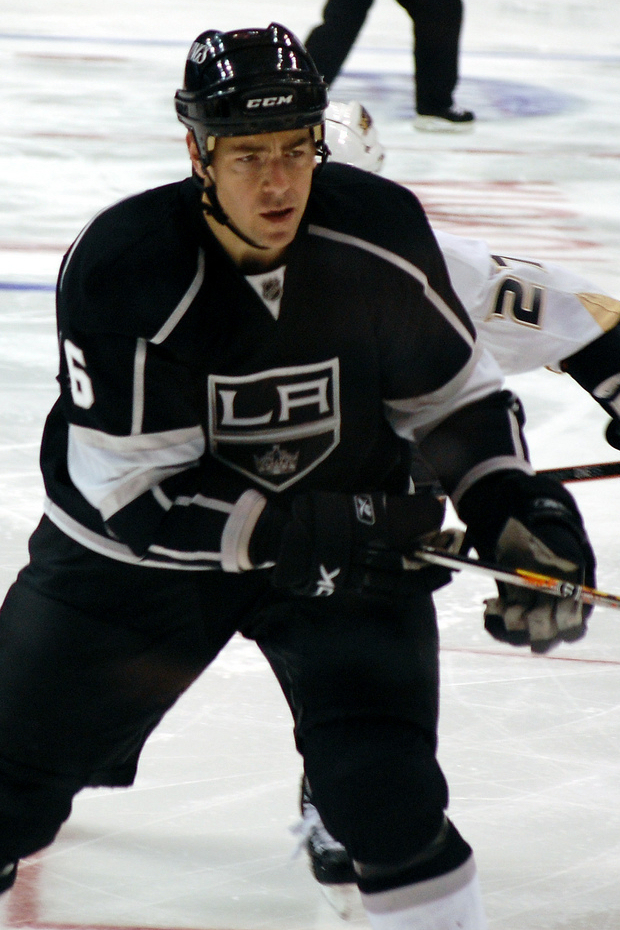
- O'Donnell with the Los Angeles Kings in January 2009
- Born: October 13, 1971 (age 54) Ottawa, Ontario, Canada
- Height: 6 ft 3 in (191 cm)
- Weight: 237 lb (108 kg; 16 st 13 lb)
- Position: Defence
- Shot: Left
- Played for: Los Angeles Kings; Minnesota Wild; New Jersey Devils; Boston Bruins; Phoenix Coyotes; Anaheim Ducks; Philadelphia Flyers; Chicago Blackhawks
- National team: Canada
- NHL draft: 123rd overall, 1991; Buffalo Sabres
- Playing career: 1991–2012

Sean O'Donnell (born October 13, 1971) is a Canadian former professional ice hockey defenceman. Drafted 123rd overall by the Buffalo Sabres in the 1991 NHL entry draft, O'Donnell has played in the National Hockey League (NHL) for the Los Angeles Kings, Minnesota Wild, New Jersey Devils, Boston Bruins, Phoenix Coyotes, Anaheim Ducks, Philadelphia Flyers and Chicago Blackhawks. He won the Stanley Cup as a member of the Ducks in 2007.

== Playing career ==
=== Minor/Junior ===
O'Donnell grew up in the Ottawa area playing minor hockey with several teams before playing his Midget season with the CJHL's Kanata Valley Lasers in 1987–88. He was a fourth-round choice, 59th overall, of the Sudbury Wolves in the 1988 Ontario Hockey League (OHL) Priority Selection.

O'Donnell played major junior in the OHL with Sudbury for three seasons. Following his third and final OHL season, he was drafted by the Buffalo Sabres in the sixth round of the 1991 NHL entry draft.

=== Professional ===
O'Donnell immediately turned professional the following season with the Sabres' American Hockey League (AHL) affiliate, the Rochester Americans. At one point during the Sabres' 1992–93 season, O'Donnell was set to make his NHL debut with the team due to the single-game suspension of Gord Donnelly. However, his flight from Rochester, New York, to Hartford, Connecticut, was cancelled, and he was unable to make it to the city in time for the game against the Whalers.

After three seasons in the Sabres organization, he was traded to the Los Angeles Kings in the 1994 off-season in exchange in exchange for Doug Houda. As a result, O'Donnell began playing in the International Hockey League (IHL) with the Kings' minor league affiliate, the Phoenix Roadrunners. During his first season in the Kings organization, he made his NHL debut in 1994–95, appearing in 15 games and recording two assists. From then on, O'Donnell established himself as a full-time NHLer, playing the following five seasons with the Kings.

On June 23, 2000, O'Donnell was released by the Kings into the 2000 NHL Expansion Draft, where he was claimed by the Minnesota Wild. Joining the expansion Wild, O'Donnell was named the franchise's first captain for the month of October as part of a rotating monthly captaincy. Late in the season, however, he was dealt at the 2001 NHL trade deadline to the New Jersey Devils in exchange for defenceman Willie Mitchell. O'Donnell went on to appear in the 2001 Stanley Cup Final with the Devils, but lost the championship to the Colorado Avalanche in seven games.

In the off-season, O'Donnell became a free agent and signed with the Boston Bruins. In his first season as a Bruin, O'Donnell recorded NHL career-highs with 22 assists and 25 points in 80 games. After three seasons in Boston, he became a free agent once more and signed with the Phoenix Coyotes. For the second time in his career, he was dealt at the trade deadline in his first season with a new club, as the Coyotes traded him to the Mighty Ducks of Anaheim in exchange for Joël Perrault. The following season, in 2006–07, O'Donnell won a Stanley Cup with the Ducks.

After another season with the Ducks, in which O'Donnell played in his 900th NHL game on January 18, 2008, against his former team, the Minnesota Wild, he was traded in the 2008 off-season to the Los Angeles Kings for a draft pick in 2009. Playing in his first season back with the Kings, O'Donnell then reached the 1,000-game mark on March 14, 2009, against the San Jose Sharks at the HP Pavilion in San Jose.

On July 1, 2010, O'Donnell signed a one-year contract with the Philadelphia Flyers.

O'Donnell signed a one-year contract worth $850,000 with the Chicago Blackhawks on July 1, 2011.

After 17 seasons in the NHL, O'Donnell announced his retirement on January 16, 2013.

== Personal life ==
O'Donnell grew up in Ottawa, Ontario, and has a younger sister, Tracey and a younger brother, Mark, who also played professional hockey. On July 11, 2009, Sean married wife Laura Marie Buka in Detroit, Michigan.

While injured with Boston, O'Donnell did some pre- and post-game TV host work on NESN. In 2013, after his retirement from professional hockey, he returned to the Los Angeles Kings organization to work both in the team's hockey development department and as an analyst on the team's television broadcasts. He has also been involved in numerous charities throughout his career and enjoys working with the Boys & Girls Clubs of America.

== Career statistics ==
=== Regular season and playoffs ===
			Regular season					Playoffs
Season	Team	League	GP	G	A	Pts	PIM	GP	G	A	Pts	PIM
1987–88	Kanata Valley Lasers	CJHL	44	4	19	23	107	—	—	—	—	—
1988–89	Sudbury Wolves	OHL	56	1	9	10	49	—	—	—	—	—
1989–90	Sudbury Wolves	OHL	64	7	19	26	84	7	1	2	3	8
1990–91	Sudbury Wolves	OHL	66	8	23	31	114	5	1	4	5	10
1991–92	Rochester Americans	AHL	73	4	9	13	193	16	1	2	3	21
1992–93	Rochester Americans	AHL	74	3	18	21	203	17	1	6	7	38
1993–94	Rochester Americans	AHL	64	2	10	12	242	4	0	1	1	21
1994–95	Phoenix Roadrunners	IHL	61	2	18	20	132	9	0	1	1	21
1994–95	Los Angeles Kings	NHL	15	0	2	2	49	—	—	—	—	—
1995–96	Los Angeles Kings	NHL	71	2	5	7	127	—	—	—	—	—
1996–97	Los Angeles Kings	NHL	55	5	12	17	144	—	—	—	—	—
1997–98	Los Angeles Kings	NHL	80	2	15	17	179	4	1	0	1	36
1998–99	Los Angeles Kings	NHL	80	1	13	14	186	—	—	—	—	—
1999–00	Los Angeles Kings	NHL	80	2	12	14	114	4	1	0	1	4
2000–01	Minnesota Wild	NHL	63	4	12	16	128	—	—	—	—	—
2000–01	New Jersey Devils	NHL	17	0	1	1	33	23	1	2	3	41
2001–02	Boston Bruins	NHL	80	3	22	25	89	6	0	2	2	4
2002–03	Boston Bruins	NHL	70	1	15	16	76	—	—	—	—	—
2003–04	Boston Bruins	NHL	82	1	10	11	110	7	0	0	0	0
2005–06	Phoenix Coyotes	NHL	57	1	7	8	121	—	—	—	—	—
2005–06	Mighty Ducks of Anaheim	NHL	21	1	2	3	26	16	2	3	5	23
2006–07	Anaheim Ducks	NHL	79	2	15	17	92	21	0	2	2	10
2007–08	Anaheim Ducks	NHL	82	2	7	9	84	6	1	1	2	2
2008–09	Los Angeles Kings	NHL	82	0	12	12	71	—	—	—	—	—
2009–10	Los Angeles Kings	NHL	78	3	12	15	70	6	0	1	1	4
2010–11	Philadelphia Flyers	NHL	81	1	17	18	87	11	0	2	2	5
2011–12	Chicago Blackhawks	NHL	51	0	7	7	23	2	0	0	0	0
NHL totals			1,224	31	198	229	1,809	106	6	13	19	129

=== International ===
Year	Team	Event	GP	G	A	Pts	PIM
1999	Canada	WC	9	1	2	3	6
Senior totals			9	1	2	3	6

== Awards and honours ==
Award	Year
NHL
Stanley Cup champion	2007

== See also ==
- List of NHL players with 1,000 games played

Preceded by Position created	Minnesota Wild captain October 2000	Succeeded by Scott Pellerin
