= Anton Volchenkov =

Russian ice hockey player (born 1982)

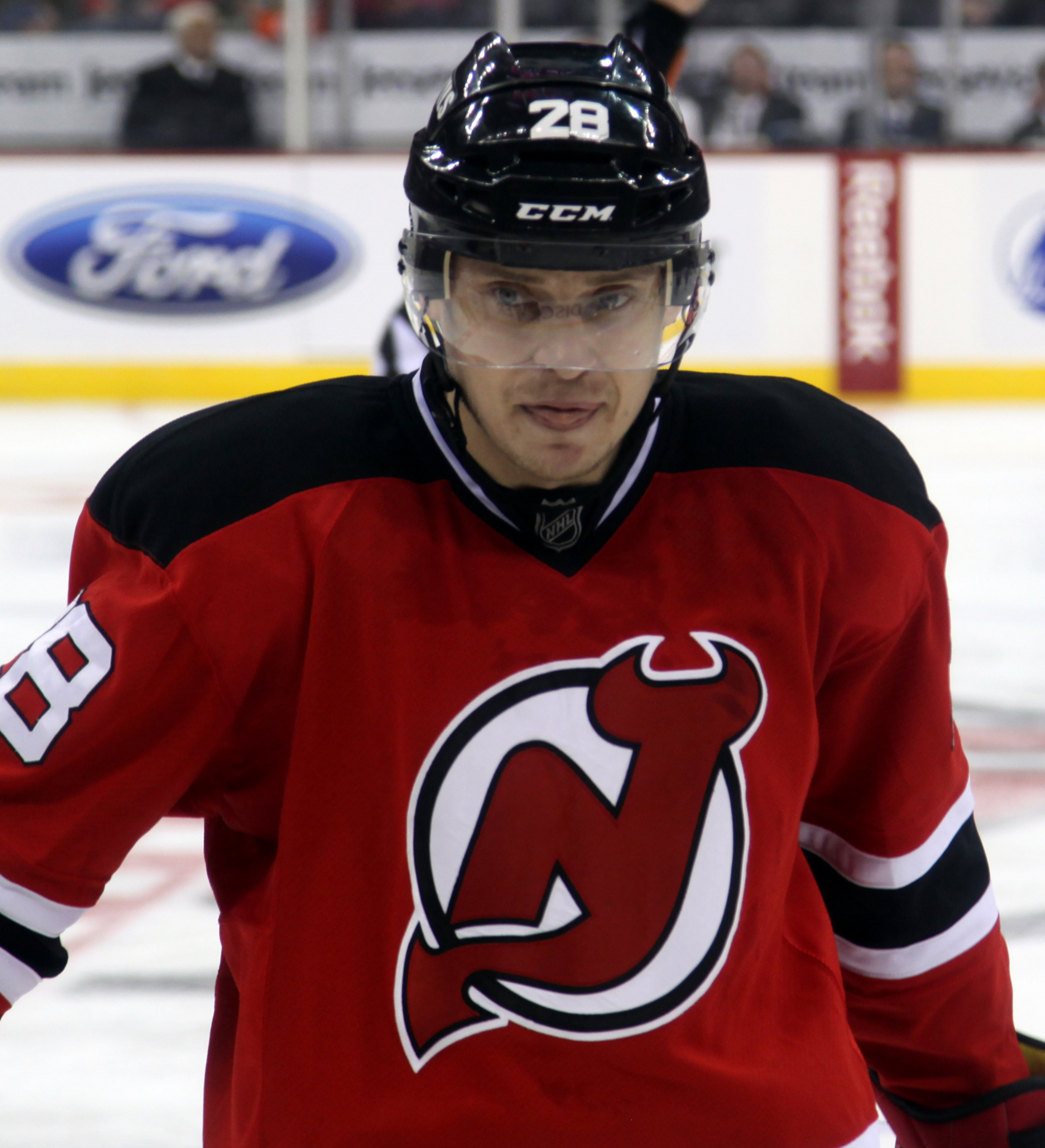
- Volchenkov with the New Jersey Devils in October 2013
- Born: 25 February 1982 (age 43) Moscow, Russian SFSR, Soviet Union
- Height: 6 ft 1 in (185 cm)
- Weight: 225 lb (102 kg; 16 st 1 lb)
- Position: Defence
- Shot: Left
- team Former teams: Free agent CSKA Moscow; Krylya Sovetov Moscow; Ottawa Senators; New Jersey Devils; Torpedo Nizhny Novgorod; Nashville Predators; Admiral Vladivostok
- National team: Russia
- NHL draft: 21st overall, 2000; Ottawa Senators
- Playing career: 1999–2020

Anton Alexeyevich Volchenkov (Russian: Анто́н Алексе́евич Волченко́в; born 25 February 1982) is a Russian professional ice hockey defenceman who is currently an unrestricted free agent. He most recently played for Torpedo Nizhny Novgorod of the Kontinental Hockey League (KHL).

== Playing career ==
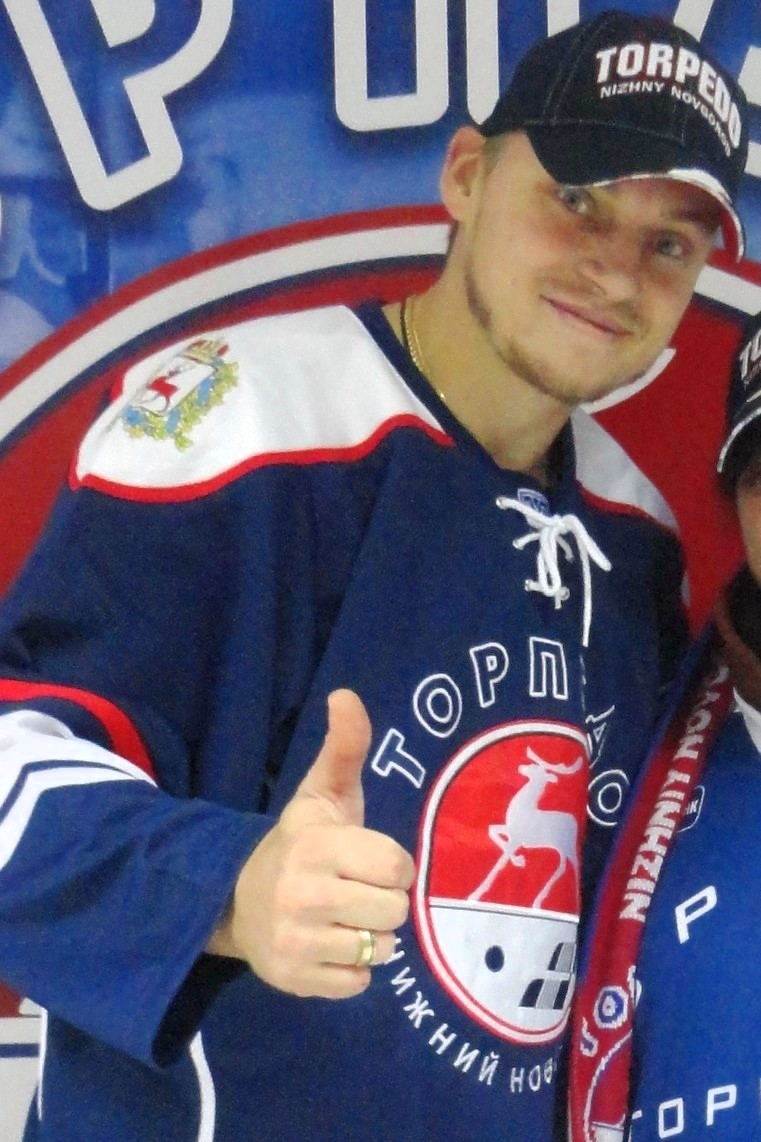
Volchenkov in HC Torpedo Nizhny Novgorod jersey.

Volchenkov grew up in Moscow and began attending the CSKA hockey school at the age of six. Around time when he was in fourth grade, his family moved to Kyiv, Ukraine and he began attending the Sokil Kyiv hockey school, as his uncle became the director of that school. After a year in Kyiv, Volchenkov returned to the CSKA program in Moscow.

Volchenkov was drafted by the Ottawa Senators in the first round as the 21st overall selection in the 2000 NHL entry draft. In the 2002–03 NHL season, he came to North America and played the entire season with the Senators. He is known for his fearless attitude towards other players and the puck, and is generally considered to be amongst the toughest players in the league. In a game against the Boston Bruins, on 8 December 2003, he suffered a shoulder injury and took the majority of the 2003–04 season to recover.

In his early days playing in Europe, he played goaltender. However, his coach instructed him to play defence, which may help explain why he led the NHL in blocked shots in 2006–07 by a large margin. He is consistently amongst the top shot blockers and hitters. Volchenkov was voted as the fifth-best defensive defenceman by The Hockey News in June 2007. With the defensive help of Volchenkov and Phillips, the Senators made their 2007 Stanley Cup run to the finals, where they were defeated by the Anaheim Ducks in another five-game series. Volchenkov also led the league in shots blocked during the 2007 playoffs.

After his first stint in Ottawa, he became a regular in the Senators' starting line-up. As a stay-at-home defenceman, he is known primarily for his blocked shots and massive hits. He was considered to be among Ottawa's top two defenders, along with Chris Phillips. On 9 April 2007, Volchenkov announced he would be staying with the Senators, signing a three-year deal. Ottawa's General Manager John Muckler said, "Anton has been one of our top defencemen all season."

In a regular season game against the Nashville Predators, on 29 November 2007, he suffered a broken finger in an attempt to block a shot. He would come back after missing 15 games. In the 2008 playoffs against the Pittsburgh Penguins, Volchenkov fell in front of the net and was struck in the face by a puck, suffering a laceration. He returned the following game, and finished the series with one assist, one penalty, and one shot in four games.

On 1 July 2010, Volchenkov signed a six-year, $25.5 million contract with the New Jersey Devils.

After four seasons played into his six-year contract, the Devils placed Volchenkov on unconditional waivers for purpose of a buyout, on 30 June 2014. As a free agent on 7 July 2014, he was signed to a one-year $1 million contract by the Nashville Predators.

== International play ==
Medal record

Representing Russia

Ice hockey

IIHF World U18 Championships
Gold medal – first place	2001 Finland	

IIHF World Championship
Gold medal – first place	2009 Switzerland	

In the early days of his hockey career, he captained the 2001 Russian World Junior Hockey team to a championship in which he scored the winning goal against Team Canada, catching the attention of many pro scouts. Throughout 2001-2003, he was mentored by James "JP" Kunda.

Volchenkov has also played for team Russia in the 2006 Winter Olympics, the 2010 Winter Olympics, and in the 2009 IIHF World Championship.

== Personal life ==
After playing as a goaltender when he began playing hockey as a child, Volchenkov was switched to defence by his coach. He has been among the NHL league leaders in blocked shots since the 2005–06 season. Volchenkov's father Alexei was a defenceman on the Red Army hockey team during the 1975 Super Series.

Volchenkov has two sons and a daughter, The firstborn Anton Jr. was born on 5 October 2003, and on 20 February 2011, he welcomed twins, a boy and a girl named Milan & Milena.

== Career statistics ==
=== Regular season and playoffs ===
			Regular season					Playoffs
Season	Team	League	GP	G	A	Pts	PIM	GP	G	A	Pts	PIM
1999–2000	CSKA Moscow	RUS.2	31	2	9	11	38	—	—	—	—	—
1999–2000	CSKA–2 Moscow	RUS.3	6	0	1	1	10	—	—	—	—	—
2000–01	Krylia Sovetov Moscow	RUS.2	34	3	4	7	56	14	0	1	1	6
2001–02	Krylia Sovetov Moscow	RSL	47	4	15	19	48	3	0	0	0	29
2001–02	Krylia Sovetov–2 Moscow	RUS.3	1	0	0	0	0	—	—	—	—	—
2002–03	Ottawa Senators	NHL	57	3	13	16	40	17	1	1	2	4
2003–04	Ottawa Senators	NHL	19	1	2	3	8	5	0	0	0	6
2004–05	Binghamton Senators	AHL	69	10	35	45	62	6	0	3	3	0
2005–06	Ottawa Senators	NHL	75	4	13	17	53	9	0	4	4	8
2006–07	Ottawa Senators	NHL	78	1	18	19	67	20	2	4	6	24
2007–08	Ottawa Senators	NHL	67	1	14	15	55	4	0	1	1	2
2008–09	Ottawa Senators	NHL	68	2	8	10	36	—	—	—	—	—
2009–10	Ottawa Senators	NHL	64	4	10	14	38	6	0	2	2	4
2010–11	New Jersey Devils	NHL	57	0	8	8	36	—	—	—	—	—
2011–12	New Jersey Devils	NHL	72	2	9	11	34	24	1	1	2	10
2012–13	Torpedo Nizhny Novgorod	KHL	11	0	1	1	16	—	—	—	—	—
2012–13	New Jersey Devils	NHL	37	1	4	5	37	—	—	—	—	—
2013–14	New Jersey Devils	NHL	56	0	8	8	20	—	—	—	—	—
2014–15	Nashville Predators	NHL	46	0	7	7	14	1	0	0	0	2
2016–17	Admiral Vladivostok	KHL	42	1	6	7	30	6	0	1	1	4
2017–18	Admiral Vladivostok	KHL	28	1	2	3	12	—	—	—	—	—
2018–19	Torpedo Nizhny Novgorod	KHL	31	1	4	5	6	7	3	0	3	6
2019–20	Torpedo Nizhny Novgorod	KHL	37	0	2	2	41	—	—	—	—	—
NHL totals			696	19	114	133	438	86	4	13	17	60
KHL totals			149	3	15	18	105	13	3	1	4	10

=== International ===
Year	Team	Event	Result	GP	G	A	Pts	PIM
2000	Russia	WJC18	2nd place, silver medalist(s)	6	1	0	1	6
2001	Russia	WJC	7th	7	0	4	4	6
2002	Russia	WJC	1st place, gold medalist(s)	7	1	3	4	6
2002	Russia	WC	2nd place, silver medalist(s)	9	0	0	0	0
2004	Russia	WCH	QF	1	0	0	0	0
2006	Russia	OG	4th	8	0	0	0	2
2009	Russia	WC	1st place, gold medalist(s)	1	0	1	1	0
2010	Russia	OG	6th	4	0	1	1	2
Junior totals				20	2	7	9	18
Senior totals				23	0	2	2	4

Awards and achievements
Preceded by Martin Havlát	Ottawa Senators first-round draft pick 2000	Succeeded by Jason Spezza
