= Cassiar, British Columbia =

Cassiar
- Location of Cassiar in British Columbia
- Coordinates: 59°17′20″N 129°50′45″W
- Country: Canada
- Province: British Columbia
- Established: 1952
- Abandoned: 1992

Cassiar is a ghost town in British Columbia, Canada. It was a small company-owned asbestos mining town located in the Cassiar Mountains of Northern British Columbia north of Dease Lake.

== History ==
The discovery of asbestos in the area in 1950 led to the founding of the Cassiar Asbestos Company in the following year. The town was established in 1952, the same year the mining operation began. By the 1970s, Cassiar had a population of 1,500 and had two schools, two churches, a small hospital, theatre, swimming pool, recreation centre and a hockey rink.

By the early 1990s, diminished demand for asbestos and expensive complications faced after converting from an open-pit mine to an underground mine made the continued operation of the mine unprofitable. In 1992, Cassiar Asbestos decided to close the mine and liquidate its assets, including the town of Cassiar itself.

Most of the contents of the town, including a few houses, were auctioned off and trucked away. Most of the remaining dwellings were bulldozed and burned to the ground. The mill was briefly reactivated in 1999 by Cassiar Chrysotile Inc which had a reclamation permit to clean up the site. 11,000 tons of asbestos were exported before the mill burned down on Christmas Day of 2000, effectively halting all production. Today the streets are bare and flowers bloom where the houses once stood. Residents living between the townsite and the Stewart-Cassiar Highway, and on the highway itself, who originally obtained phone service from the Cassiar exchange, were moved to the nearby Good Hope Lake exchange in the fall of 2006 and the Cassiar exchange shut down.

Neglected and in disrepair, the hockey arena collapsed in 2008, with the church following in 2015. The tramline which transported ore from the mine down the mountainside to the mill was purchased in the auction; however, the buyer left it, and it still stands.

The four old apartment blocks at the east end of town are operational for ongoing site reclamation work. As of November 2006, they were being used by mining exploration companies conducting underground gold mining at Table Mountain (formerly Erickson Gold) and base metal exploration in the immediate area. There was also seasonal jade mining from the Cassiar waste dumps.

== Climate ==
Cassiar has a subarctic climate (Köppen climate classification Dfc) with long, cold, and snowy winters and short, cool summers.

Climate data for Cassiar, British Columbia
Month	Jan	Feb	Mar	Apr	May	Jun	Jul	Aug	Sep	Oct	Nov	Dec	Year
Record high °C (°F)	7.0 (44.6)	9.5 (49.1)	9.0 (48.2)	16.1 (61.0)	29.5 (85.1)	29.4 (84.9)	29.4 (84.9)	30.0 (86.0)	26.1 (79.0)	15.6 (60.1)	9.4 (48.9)	7.0 (44.6)	30.0 (86.0)
Mean daily maximum °C (°F)	−10.1 (13.8)	−7.6 (18.3)	−2.5 (27.5)	3.5 (38.3)	9.2 (48.6)	15.0 (59.0)	17.3 (63.1)	15.9 (60.6)	10.0 (50.0)	2.6 (36.7)	−6.4 (20.5)	−9.7 (14.5)	3.1 (37.6)
Daily mean °C (°F)	−14.6 (5.7)	−13.2 (8.2)	−8.8 (16.2)	−2.2 (28.0)	4.1 (39.4)	9.0 (48.2)	11.5 (52.7)	10.1 (50.2)	5.4 (41.7)	−0.9 (30.4)	−10.9 (12.4)	−14.3 (6.3)	−2.1 (28.2)
Mean daily minimum °C (°F)	−19.0 (−2.2)	−18.8 (−1.8)	−15.0 (5.0)	−7.9 (17.8)	−1.1 (30.0)	2.9 (37.2)	5.6 (42.1)	4.2 (39.6)	0.9 (33.6)	−4.3 (24.3)	−15.3 (4.5)	−18.9 (−2.0)	−7.2 (19.0)
Record low °C (°F)	−45.0 (−49.0)	−47.2 (−53.0)	−44.4 (−47.9)	−30.6 (−23.1)	−16.7 (1.9)	−6.7 (19.9)	−2.8 (27.0)	−7.0 (19.4)	−12.8 (9.0)	−32.0 (−25.6)	−42.5 (−44.5)	−44.4 (−47.9)	−47.2 (−53.0)
Average precipitation mm (inches)	75.4 (2.97)	58.6 (2.31)	45.5 (1.79)	26.1 (1.03)	36.1 (1.42)	52.2 (2.06)	71.8 (2.83)	64.9 (2.56)	79.4 (3.13)	88.2 (3.47)	73.3 (2.89)	78.0 (3.07)	749.5 (29.51)
Average rainfall mm (inches)	0.3 (0.01)	0.6 (0.02)	0.4 (0.02)	3.3 (0.13)	27.5 (1.08)	51.8 (2.04)	71.8 (2.83)	63.0 (2.48)	72.8 (2.87)	39.6 (1.56)	4.7 (0.19)	1.2 (0.05)	337.0 (13.27)
Average snowfall cm (inches)	76.6 (30.2)	58.0 (22.8)	45.1 (17.8)	22.8 (9.0)	8.6 (3.4)	0.5 (0.2)	0 (0)	1.9 (0.7)	6.6 (2.6)	48.6 (19.1)	68.6 (27.0)	76.9 (30.3)	414.1 (163.0)
Average precipitation days (≥ 0.2 mm)	15.3	11.9	11.5	7.8	10.8	13.2	15.2	15.3	16.6	15.5	15.5	13.0	161.4
Average rainy days (≥ 0.2 mm)	0.24	0.45	0.29	1.9	9.0	13.1	15.2	15.3	15.7	6.8	1.0	0.25	79.1
Average snowy days (≥ 0.2 cm)	15.2	11.6	11.3	6.7	3.2	0.10	0	0.41	2.0	10.8	15.1	12.8	89.0
Source: Environment Canada

== Notable residents ==
- Rob Niedermayer, ice hockey player
- Scott Niedermayer, ice hockey player
