= Lyndon Slewidge =

Canadian singer at hockey games (born 1954)

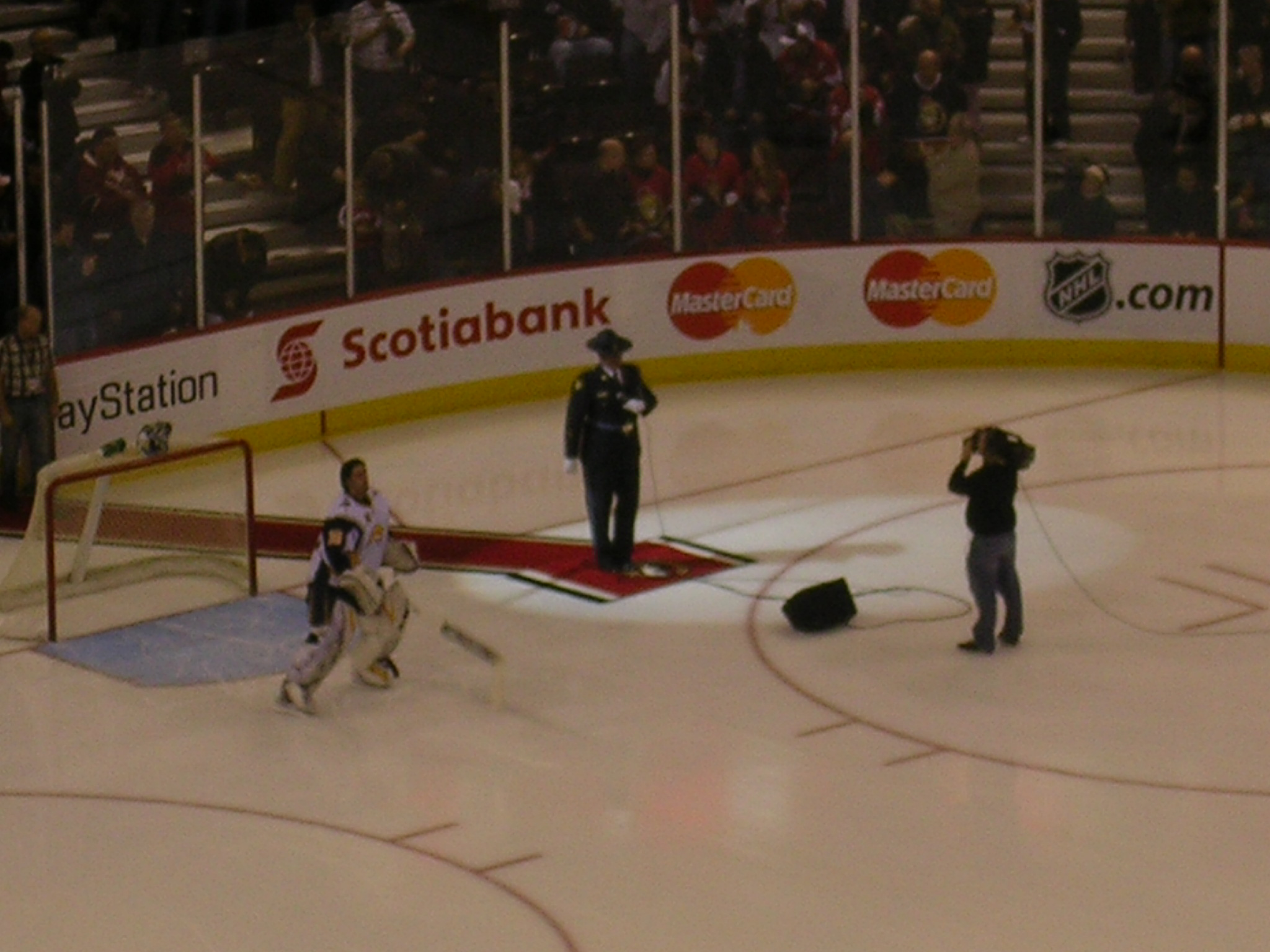
Slewidge singing "O Canada"

Lyndon Slewidge (born 1954 in Sault Ste. Marie, Ontario) is a retired Ontario Provincial Police officer. He is also a singer who specializes in national anthems. He was the official anthem singer for the Ottawa Senators ice hockey club between 1994 and 2016 and is familiar with at least 13 national anthems. In 2023, Slewidge performed the anthems for the first time since 2016 during the Ottawa Senators 2023–24 home opener. Slewidge typically ends an anthem with a salute, a wink and a thumbs up sign (or, in the playoffs, with waving a towel).

Slewidge spent his childhood in Sault Ste. Marie where at age 9 he won the Kiwanis Music Festival for his singing talent. His career in police work began there in 1975. Prior to moving to the Ottawa area, he lived in Sault Ste. Marie, Ontario where he first sang national anthems for the Sault Ste. Marie Greyhounds. He has last been stationed in Smiths Falls at the OPP's Eastern Region Headquarters. He has received the Service Medal of the Order of St John with 1 Bar.

In 1992, astronaut Roberta Bondar arranged for Slewidge to record the American and Canadian national anthems. She took the recordings aboard her flight on NASA's Space Shuttle Discovery (mission STS-42). Bondar's home city is Sault Ste. Marie, where Slewidge was stationed at that time.
