= Rob Niedermayer =

Canadian ice hockey player (born 1974)

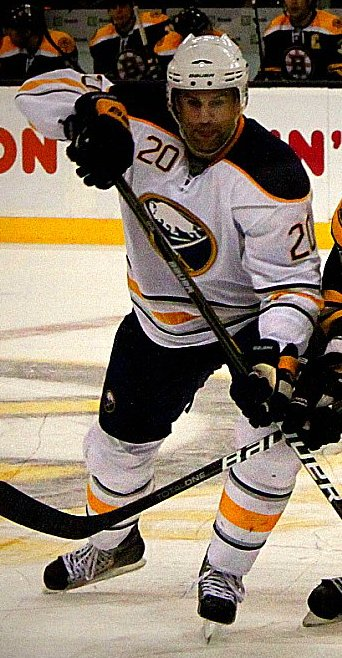
- Niedermayer with the Buffalo Sabres in 2011
- Born: December 28, 1974 (age 51) Cassiar, British Columbia, Canada
- Height: 6 ft 2 in (188 cm)
- Weight: 204 lb (93 kg; 14 st 8 lb)
- Position: Right wing
- Shot: Left
- Played for: Florida Panthers; Calgary Flames; Anaheim Ducks; New Jersey Devils; Buffalo Sabres; HC Lugano
- National team: Canada
- NHL draft: 5th overall, 1993; Florida Panthers
- Playing career: 1993–2011

Robert Wade Niedermayer Jr. (born December 28, 1974) is a Canadian former professional ice hockey player who played 17 National Hockey League (NHL) seasons for the Florida Panthers, Calgary Flames, Anaheim Ducks, New Jersey Devils, and Buffalo Sabres.

He is the younger brother of former NHL defenceman Scott Niedermayer (the two were teammates for four seasons). Born in Cassiar, British Columbia, he and his brother Scott grew up in Cranbrook.

== Playing career ==
Niedermayer was drafted fifth overall by the Florida Panthers in the 1993 NHL entry draft. At the time, he was playing for the Medicine Hat Tigers of the Western Hockey League (WHL). He began his NHL career immediately following his draft, without playing a game in the minors. During the 1995–96 season, he set career highs in goals, assists and points in the regular season. In the 1996 Stanley Cup playoffs, the Panthers went on an improbable playoff drive to the Stanley Cup Final before being swept in four games by the Colorado Avalanche. 1998-99 was his best season, putting up 18 goals and 33 assists for 51 points; however, Niedermayer was hurt by concussions in the next years and was never able to achieve the same level of scoring ability again. His NHL role soon turned into a defensive forward.

On July 23, 2001, Niedermayer was traded to the Calgary Flames (alongside a draft pick) in exchange for Valeri Bure and Jason Wiemer. At the 2003 NHL trade deadline, he was sent to the Mighty Ducks of Anaheim. That same year, he helped the Anaheim Ducks make an improbable run to the Stanley Cup Final, his second such run. But again, Niedermayer's team lost, although this time it was in seven games to his brother's team, the New Jersey Devils. He and Scott became the first set of brothers to play against each other in the Stanley Cup Final since Ken and Terry Reardon did it in 1946. In the summer of 2005, Rob's brother Scott was signed by the Mighty Ducks, and for the first time in their NHL careers, the two brothers were playing on the same team.

He and his brother Scott (by this point captain of the Ducks, with Rob as an alternate) won the Stanley Cup together as members of the Anaheim Ducks after defeating the Ottawa Senators four games to one in 2007, becoming the first brothers to win the Stanley Cup together since Duane and Brent Sutter accomplished the feat twice with the New York Islanders in 1982 and 1983. After Scott took the first lap around the ice with the Stanley Cup, he handed it to Rob. This was a break with Stanley Cup tradition; normally, the alternate captain who has waited longest to win the Cup (in the 2006–07 Ducks' case, Chris Pronger and Teemu Selänne) takes the next lap after the captain takes his lap.

On September 25, 2009, Niedermayer was signed by the New Jersey Devils, a team his brother Scott played on for 14 NHL seasons. On July 7, 2010, Niedermayer was signed by the Buffalo Sabres to a one-year contract worth a reported $1.15 million.

Rob Niedermayer warming up during the 2007 playoffs

After becoming a free agent following the 2011 season, Niedermayer signed with HC Lugano of the Swiss National League A.

== Personal ==
On July 16, 2006, Niedermayer married longtime girlfriend Jessica Bentall, daughter of Barney Bentall, whom he had been dating since March 2001. Together, they have three daughters, one of whom now plays soccer for the Mount Royal University Cougars Women's Soccer team, in Calgary, Alberta.

Niedermayer was a minority owner of major junior club the Kootenay Ice in the WHL for 18 years before selling his stake (along with brother Scott) to the Chynoweth family after the 2015–16 season.

== Career statistics ==
=== Regular season and playoffs ===
			Regular season					Playoffs
Season	Team	League	GP	G	A	Pts	PIM	GP	G	A	Pts	PIM
1990–91	Medicine Hat Tigers	WHL	71	24	26	50	8	12	3	7	10	2
1991–92	Medicine Hat Tigers	WHL	71	32	46	78	77	4	2	3	5	2
1992–93	Medicine Hat Tigers	WHL	52	43	34	77	67	—	—	—	—	—
1993–94	Florida Panthers	NHL	65	9	17	26	51	—	—	—	—	—
1994–95	Medicine Hat Tigers	WHL	13	9	15	24	14	—	—	—	—	—
1994–95	Florida Panthers	NHL	48	4	6	10	36	—	—	—	—	—
1995–96	Florida Panthers	NHL	82	26	35	61	107	22	5	3	8	12
1996–97	Florida Panthers	NHL	60	14	24	38	54	5	2	1	3	6
1997–98	Florida Panthers	NHL	33	8	7	15	41	—	—	—	—	—
1998–99	Florida Panthers	NHL	82	18	33	51	50	—	—	—	—	—
1999–2000	Florida Panthers	NHL	81	10	23	33	46	—	—	—	—	—
2000–01	Florida Panthers	NHL	67	12	20	32	50	4	1	0	1	6
2001–02	Calgary Flames	NHL	57	6	14	20	49	—	—	—	—	—
2002–03	Calgary Flames	NHL	54	8	10	18	42	—	—	—	—	—
2002–03	Mighty Ducks of Anaheim	NHL	12	2	2	4	15	21	3	7	10	18
2003–04	Mighty Ducks of Anaheim	NHL	55	12	16	28	34	—	—	—	—	—
2004–05	Ferencvárosi TC	HUN	5	2	1	3	14	—	—	—	—	—
2005–06	Mighty Ducks of Anaheim	NHL	76	15	24	39	89	16	1	3	4	10
2006–07	Anaheim Ducks	NHL	82	5	11	16	77	21	5	5	10	39
2007–08	Anaheim Ducks	NHL	78	8	8	16	54	2	0	0	0	0
2008–09	Anaheim Ducks	NHL	79	14	7	21	42	13	0	3	3	12
2009–10	New Jersey Devils	NHL	71	10	12	22	45	5	0	0	0	6
2010–11	Buffalo Sabres	NHL	71	5	14	19	22	7	1	3	4	2
2011–12	HC Lugano	NLA	14	2	4	6	12	—	—	—	—	—
NHL totals			1,153	186	283	469	904	116	18	25	43	111

=== International ===
Medal record

Representing Canada

World Championships
Gold medal – first place	2004 Czech Republic	

World Junior Championships
Gold medal – first place	1993 Sweden	

Year	Team	Event	Result	GP	G	A	Pts	PIM
1993	Canada	WJC	1st place, gold medalist(s)	7	0	2	2	2
1999	Canada	WC	4th	10	2	1	3	8
2004	Canada	WC	1st place, gold medalist(s)	9	2	4	6	22
Junior totals				7	0	2	2	2
Senior totals				19	4	5	9	30

== Awards and honours ==
Award	Year
WHL
East First All-Star Team	1993
NHL
Stanley Cup champion (Anaheim Ducks)	2007

== Transactions ==
- June 26, 1993 – drafted by the Florida Panthers in the first round, fifth overall in the 1993 NHL entry draft
- June 23, 2001 – traded to the Calgary Flames with a 2001 second round draft pick (Andrei Medvedev) for Valeri Bure and Jason Wiemer
- March 11, 2003 – traded to the Mighty Ducks of Anaheim for Jean-François Damphousse and Mike Commodore
- September 25, 2009 – signed by the New Jersey Devils as an unrestricted free agent
- July 7, 2010 – signed by the Buffalo Sabres as an unrestricted free agent

== See also ==
- Notable families in the NHL
- List of NHL players with 1,000 games played

Awards and achievements
Preceded by None	Florida Panthers first-round draft pick 1993	Succeeded by Ed Jovanovski
