= Michael Schulman =

American sports executive

- Born: United States
- Citizenship: United States
- Occupation: Chief executive officer
- Years active: 2003–present
- Employer: Anaheim Ducks
- Organization: National Hockey League

Michael Schulman is an American sports executive. He is the CEO and alternate governor of the Anaheim Ducks of the National Hockey League (NHL).
