= List of Anaheim Ducks players =

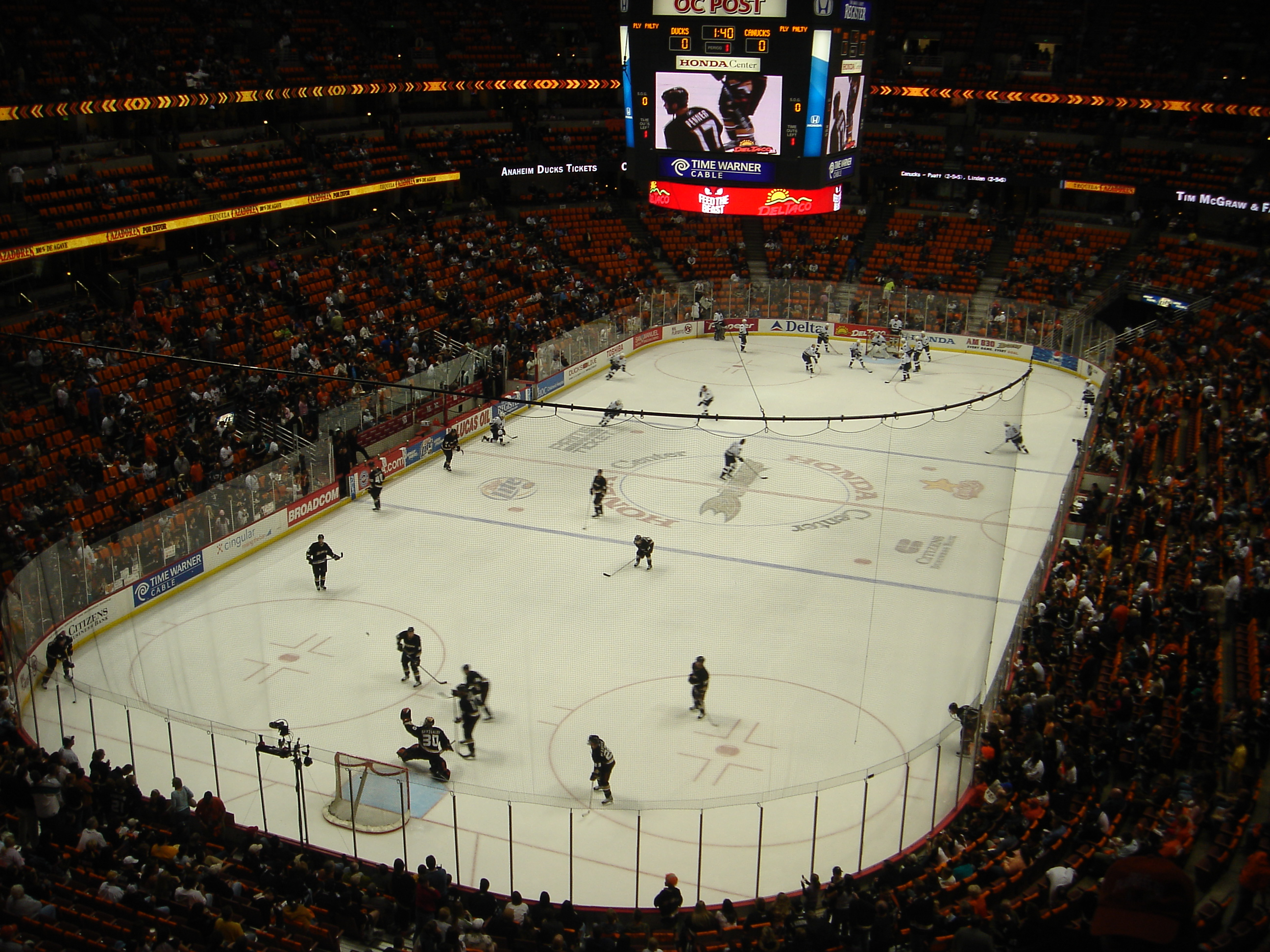
The Ducks warm-up at the Honda Center before a playoff game in 2007

The Anaheim Ducks are a professional ice hockey team based in Anaheim, California, USA. They are members of the Pacific Division of the Western Conference of the National Hockey League (NHL). The team was founded as an expansion franchise in 1993 as the Mighty Ducks of Anaheim. At the end of the 2018–19 season, 390 players, 31 goaltenders and 359 skaters (forwards and defenseman), have played at least one game for Ducks in the regular or post-season.

== Key ==
- Appeared in a Ducks game during the 2025–26 season.
- Stanley Cup Champion, Hockey Hall of Famer, or retired number.

Abbreviations
GP	Games played
HHOF	Elected to the Hockey Hall of Fame
SC	Stanley Cup Champion

Goaltenders
W	Wins
SO	Shutouts
L	Losses
GAA	Goals against average
T	Ties
OTL ^{a}	Overtime losses
SV%	Save percentage

Skaters
Pos	Position	RW	Right wing	A	Assists
D	Defenseman	C	Center	P	Points
LW	Left wing	G	Goals	PIM	Penalty minutes

The "Seasons" column lists the first year of the season of the player's first game and the last year of the season of the player's last game. For example, a player who played one game in the 2000–2001 season would be listed as playing with the team from 2000–2001, regardless of what calendar year the game occurred within.

Statistics complete as of the 2025–26 NHL season.

== Goaltenders ==
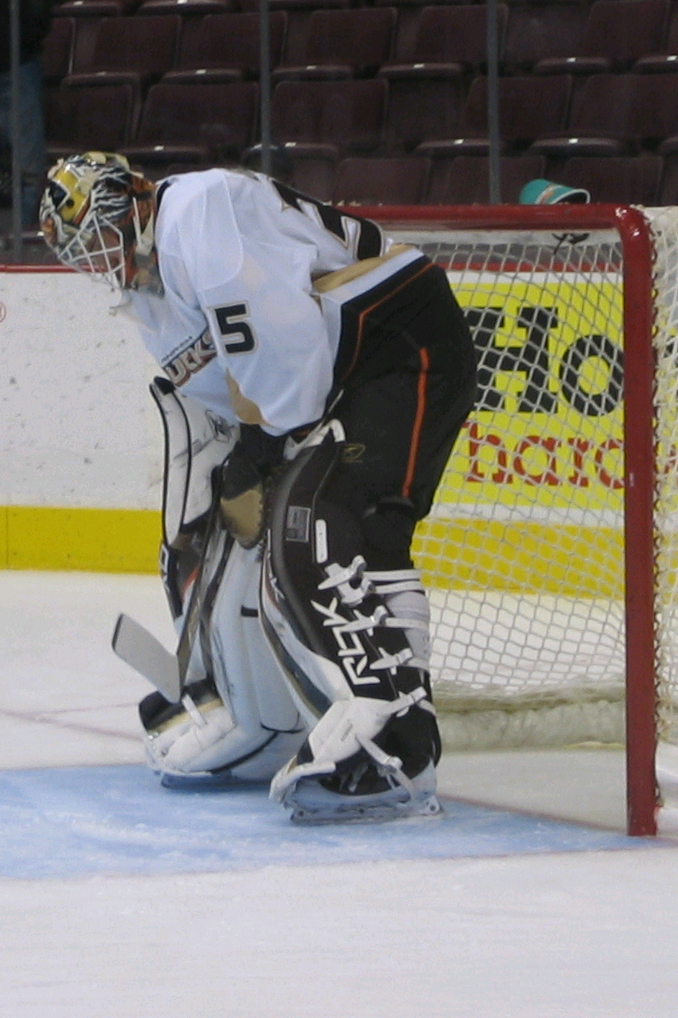
Jean-Sebastien Giguere was the starting goaltender for the Ducks when they won the Stanley Cup in 2007

Name	Nat	Seasons	GP	W	L	T	OTL	SO	GAA	SV%	GP	W	L	SO	GAA	SV%	Notes
Name	Nat	Seasons	Regular-season								Playoffs						Notes
Andersen, Frederik	(Denmark)	2013–2016	125	77	26	—	12	6	2.33	.918	28	17	9	2	2.34	.916	
Askey, Tom	(United States)	1997–1999	7	0	1	2	—	0	2.64	.894	1	0	1	0	4.00	.818	
Bernier, Jonathan	(Canada)	2016–2017	39	21	7	—	4	2	2.50	.915	4	1	2	0	3.28	.873	
Berra, Reto	(Switzerland)	2017–2018	5	1	1	—	0	0	2.31	.926	—	—	—	—	—	—	
Boyle, Kevin	(United States)	2018–2020	5	1	3	—	0	1	2.17	.928	—	—	—	—	—	—	
Bryzgalov, Ilya	(Russia)	2001–2008; 2014–2015	77	27	27	0	9	2	2.63	.904	16	9	5	3	1.69	.937	SC 2007
Buteyets, Vyacheslav	(Russia)	2025–2026	1	0	0	—	0	0	9.00	.769	—	—	—	—	—	—	
Caron, Sebastien	(Canada)	2006–2007	1	0	0	—	0	0	2.14	.833	—	—	—	—	—	—	
Deslauriers, Jeff	(Canada)	2011–2012	4	3	1	—	0	0	2.74	.903	—	—	—	—	—	—	
Dostal, Lukas	(Czech Republic)	2021–2026	177	72	78	—	17	2	3.23	.898	12	6	6	0	3.54	.870	
Ellis, Dan	(Canada)	2010–2012	23	9	8	—	1	0	2.51	.915	1	0	1	0	5.86	.833	
Emery, Ray	(Canada)	2010–2011	10	7	2	—	0	0	2.28	.926	6	2	3	0	3.19	.897	
Eriksson Ek, Olle	(Sweden)	2022–2023	1	0	0	—	1	0	4.69	.872	—	—	—	—	—	—	
Fasth, Viktor	(Sweden)	2012–2014	30	17	8	—	3	4	2.32	.915	—	—	—	—	—	—	
Gerber, Martin	(Switzerland)	2002–2004	54	17	23	—	7	3	2.13	.923	2	0	0	0	3.00	.833	
Gibson, John	(United States)	2013–2025	506	204	217	—	63	24	2.89	.910	26	11	13	1	2.80	.912	
Giguere, Jean-Sebastien	(Canada)	2000–2010	447	206	163	23	50	32	2.47	.914	52	33	17	6	2.09	.925	SC 2007
Hebert, Guy	(United States)	1993–2001	441	173	202	52	—	27	2.75	.911	13	4	7	1	2.67	.913	
Hiller, Jonas	(Switzerland)	2007–2014	326	162	110	—	32	21	2.51	.916	26	12	12	3	2.29	.922	
Hodges, Thomas	(United Kingdom)	2021–2022	1	0	0	—	0	0	3.11	.667	—	—	—	—	—	—	
Husso, Ville	(Finland)	2024–2026	24	11	9	—	3	0	3.21	.892	2	0	0	0	2.12	.900	
Johnson, Chad	(Canada)	2018–2019	9	4	0	—	5	0	3.75	.872	—	—	—	—	—	—	
Khudobin, Anton	(Russia)	2015–2016	9	3	3	—	0	1	2.31	.909	—	—	—	—	—	—	
LaBarbera, Jason	(Canada)	2014–2015	5	2	0	—	1	0	2.61	.909	—	—	—	—	—	—	
McElhinney, Curtis	(Canada)	2009–2011	31	11	10	—	3	2	3.20	.899	—	—	—	—	—	—	
Miller, Ryan	(United States)	2017–2021	87	33	27	—	14	5	2.87	.910	—	—	—	—	—	—	
Mrazek, Petr	(Czech Republic)	2025–2026	10	3	5	—	0	0	4.07	.858	—	—	—	—	—	—	
Naumenko, Gregg	(United States)	2000–2001	2	0	1	0	—	0	6.00	.759	—	—	—	—	—	—	
O'Neill, Mike	(Canada)	1996–1997	1	0	0	0	—	0	5.81	.700	—	—	—	—	—	—	
Pielmeier, Timo	(Germany)	2010–2011	1	0	0	—	0	0	7.50	.583	—	—	—	—	—	—	
Reimer, James	(Canada)	2024–2025	2	0	2	—	0	0	4.50	.864f	—	—	—	—	—	—	
Roussel, Dominic	(Canada)	1998–2001	51	12	15	9	—	2	2.85	.901	—	—	—	—	—	—	
Shields, Steve	(Canada)	2001–2002	33	9	20	2	—	0	2.67	.907	—	—	—	—	—	—	
Shtalenkov, Mikhail	(Russia)	1993–1998	122	34	53	11	—	3	3.14	.897	4	0	3	0	2.84	.938	
Stolarz, Anthony	(United States)	2019–2023	56	21	18	—	3	4	2.88	.913	—	—	—	—	—	—	
Tarkki, Iiro	(Finland)	2011–2012	1	1	0	—	0	0	4.41	.700	—	—	—	—	—	—	
Tokarski, Dustin	(Canada)	2016–2017	1	0	0	—	0	0	0.00	1.000	—	—	—	—	—	—	
Tugnutt, Ron	(Canada)	1993–1994	28	10	15	1	—	1	3.00	.908	—	—	—	—	—	—	
Wall, Michael	(Canada)	2006–2007	4	2	2	—	0	0	2.99	.877	—	—	—	—	—	—	

== Skaters ==
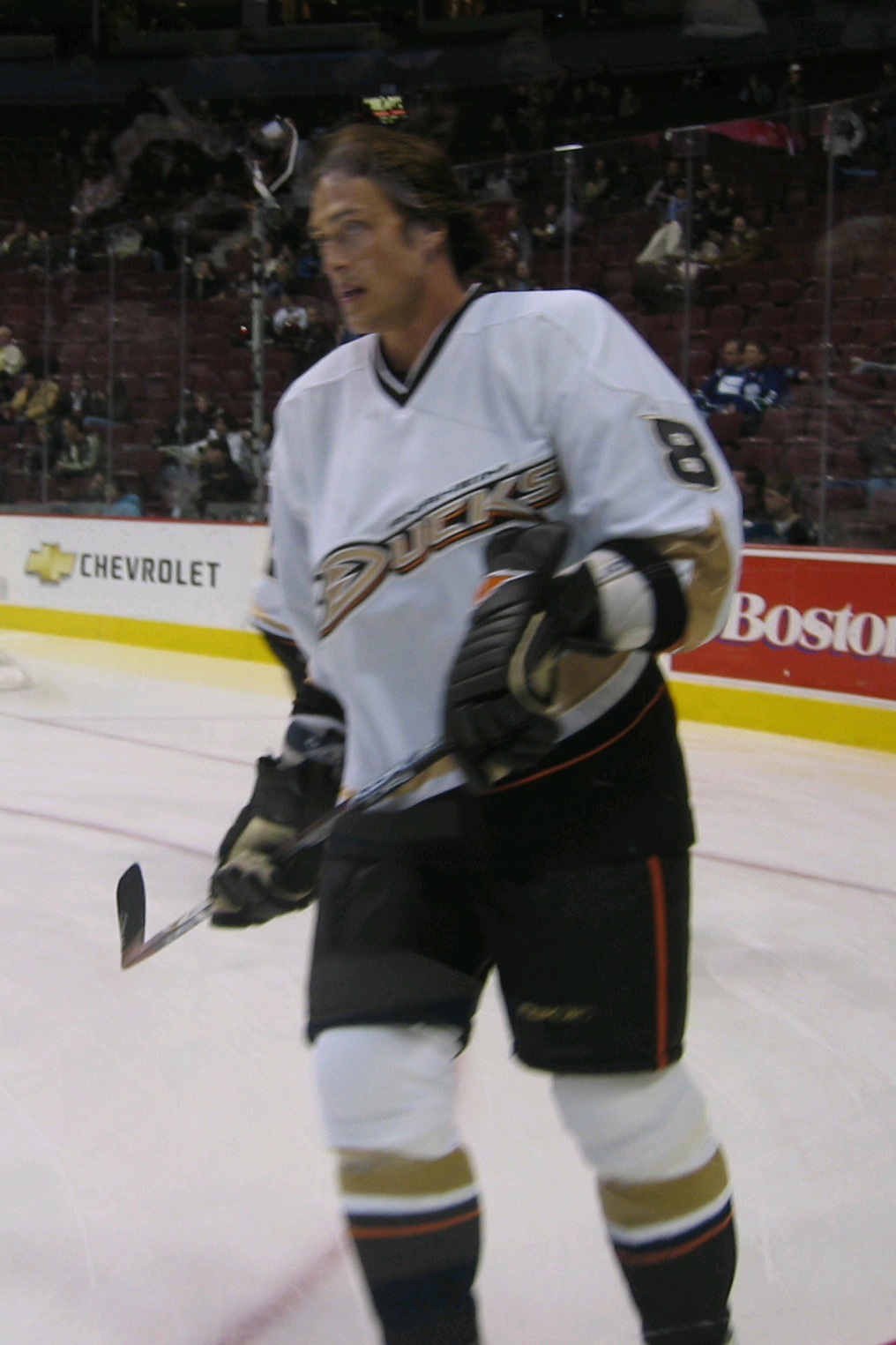
Teemu Selanne is the Ducks all-time leader in goals, points and games.

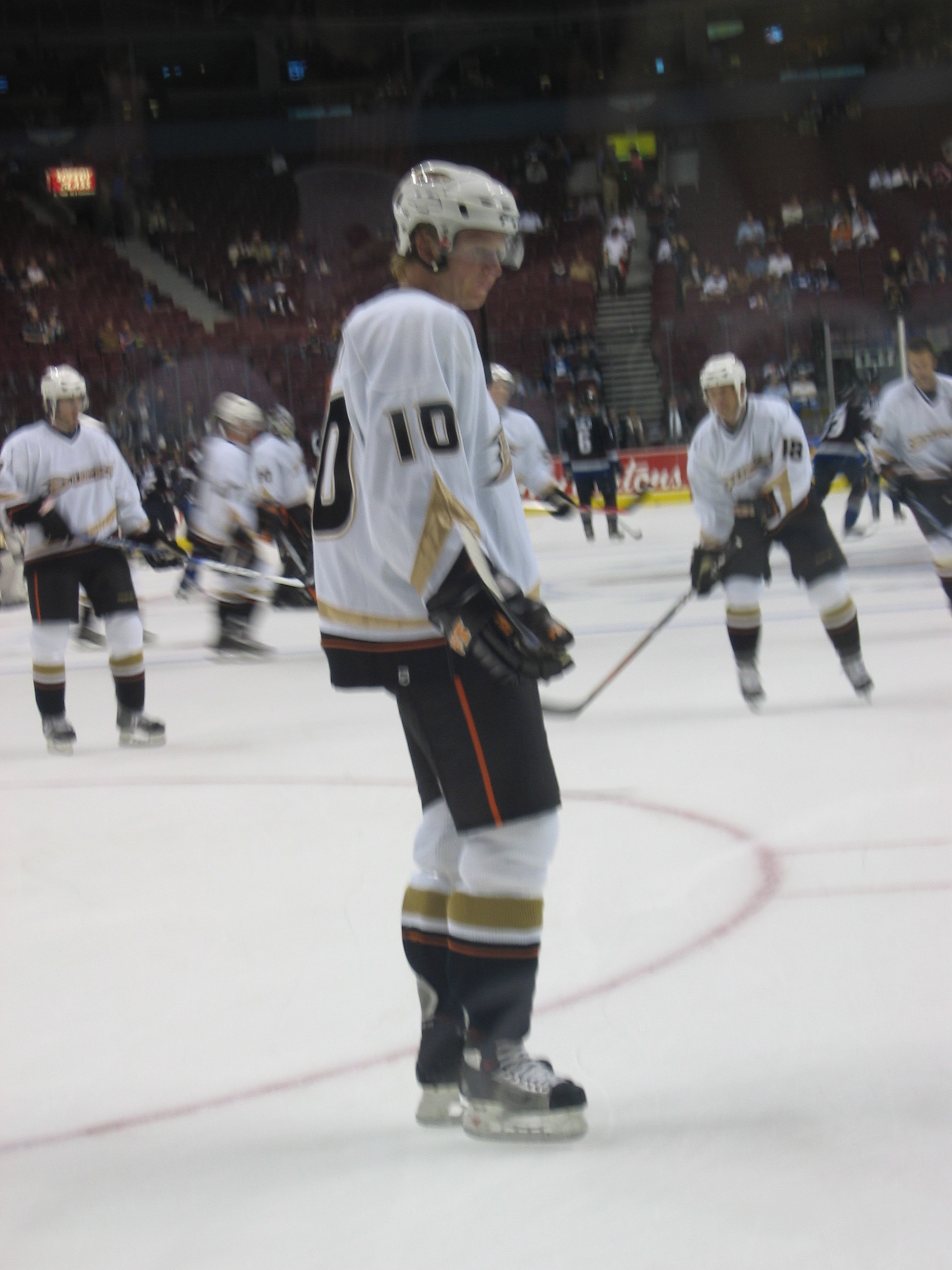
Corey Perry won both the Maurice "Rocket" Richard Trophy and Hart Memorial Trophy in 2011 while playing in Anaheim

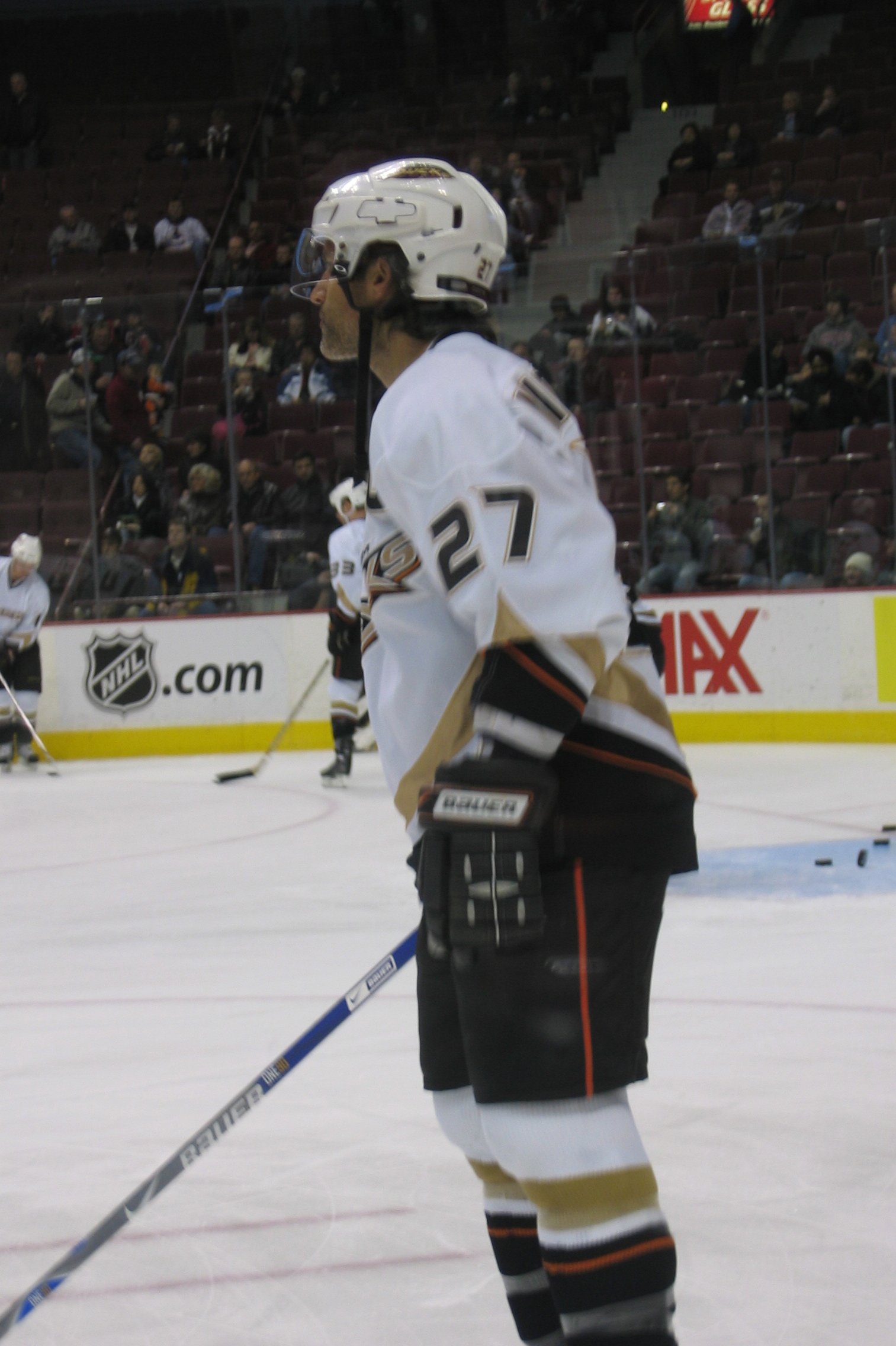
Scott Niedermayer, captain of the 2007 Stanley Cup team, signed as a free agent with the Ducks in 2005

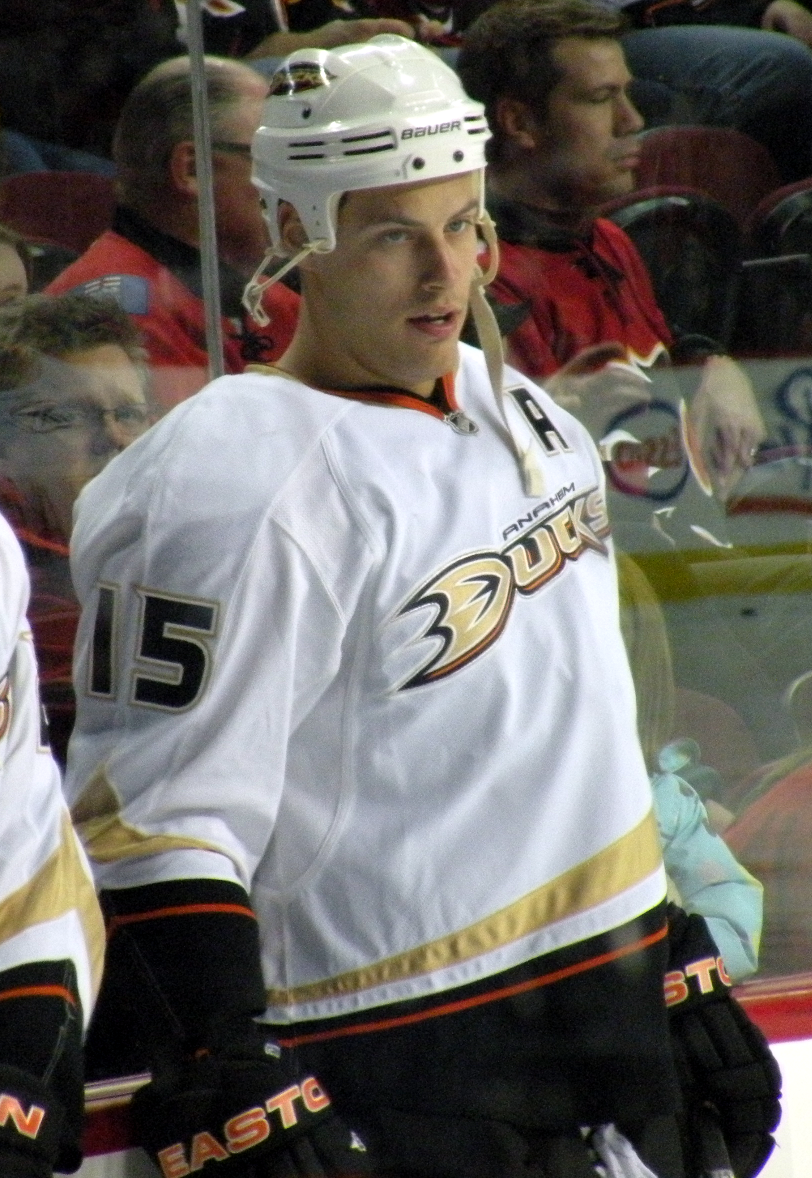
Ryan Getzlaf, the current Ducks captain, was a first round draft choice for the Ducks in 2003.

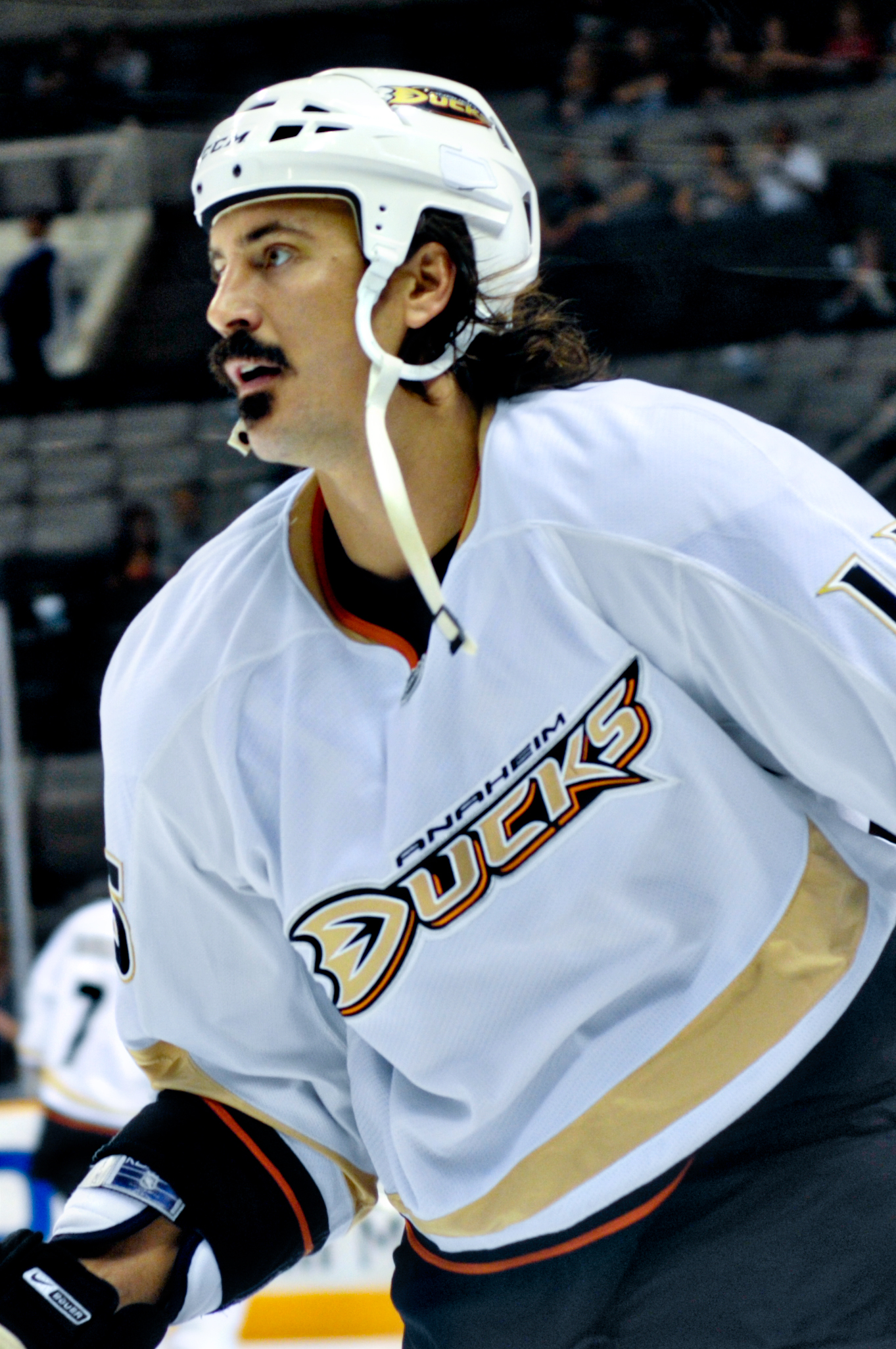
George Parros amassed over 800 penalty minutes while playing for the Ducks

Name	Nat	Pos	Seasons	GP	G	A	P	PIM	GP	G	A	P	PIM	Notes
Name	Nat	Pos	Seasons	Regular-season					Playoffs					Notes
Aalto, Antti	(Finland)	C	1997–2001	151	11	17	28	52	4	0	0	0	2	
Aberg, Pontus	(Sweden)	LW	2018–2019	37	11	8	19	14	—	—	—	—	—	
Agozzino, Andrew	(Canada)	LW	2019–2021	8	1	1	2	0	—	—	—	—	—	
Allen, Bryan	(Canada)	D	2012–2015	115	0	17	17	113	20	1	1	2	30	
Antoski, Shawn	(Canada)	LW	1996–1998	11	1	0	1	20	—	—	—	—	—	
Armstrong, Chris	(Canada)	D	2003–2004	4	0	1	1	0	—	—	—	—	—	
Artyukhin, Evgeny	(Russia)	RW	2009–2010	37	4	5	9	41	—	—	—	—	—	
Aston-Reese, Zach	(United States)	C	2021–2022	17	3	1	4	6	—	—	—	—	—	
Backes, David	(United States)	RW	2019–2021	21	3	4	7	10	—	—	—	—	—	
Balmochnykh, Maxim	(Russia)	LW	1999–2000	6	0	1	1	2	—	—	—	—	—	
Banham, Frank	(Canada)	RW	1996–1998; 1999–2000	27	9	2	11	14	—	—	—	—	—	
Bannister, Drew	(Canada)	D	1997–1998; 2001–2002	28	0	6	6	47	—	—	—	—	—	
Baumgartner, Ken	(Canada)	LW	1995–1997	79	0	12	12	223	11	0	1	1	11	
Bawa, Robin	(Canada)	C	1993–1994	12	0	1	1	7	—	—	—	—	—	
Beauchemin, Francois	(Canada)	D	2005–2009; 2010–2015; 2017–2018	592	56	140	196	360	101	10	29	39	80	SC 2007
Beaulieu, Nathan	(Canada)	D	2022–2023	52	0	4	4	39	—	—	—	—	—	
Beleskey, Matt	(Canada)	LW	2008–2015	329	57	55	112	302	34	13	4	17	16	
Bell, Mark	(Canada)	LW	2011–2012	5	0	0	0	0	—	—	—	—	—	
Bellows, Brian	(Canada)	LW	1996–1997	62	15	13	28	22	11	2	4	6	2	
Benoit, Simon	(Canada)	D	2020–2023	137	4	11	15	84	—	—	—	—	—	
Bergeron, Marc-Andre	(Canada)	D	2007–2008	9	0	1	1	4	—	—	—	—	—	
Bertuzzi, Todd	(Canada)	RW	2007–2008	68	14	26	40	97	6	0	2	2	14	
Bets, Maxim	(Russia)	LW	1993–1994	3	0	0	0	0	—	—	—	—	—	
Bieksa, Kevin	(Canada)	D	2015–2018	211	7	30	37	245	15	0	5	5	25	
Blacker, Jesse	(Canada)	LW	2014–2015	1	0	0	0	0	—	—	—	—	—	
Blake, Jason	(United States)	RW	2009–2012	147	29	30	59	57	6	3	1	4	0	
Blandisi, Joseph	(Canada)	C	2017–2019	6	0	0	0	8	—	—	—	—	—	
Bochenski, Brandon	(United States)	RW	2007–2008	12	2	2	4	6	—	—	—	—	—	
Bodie, Troy	(Canada)	RW	2008–2011	57	5	3	8	87	—	—	—	—	—	
Boll, Jared	(United States)	RW	2016–2018	61	1	3	4	103	8	0	0	0	5	
Bonino, Nick	(United States)	C	2009–2014	189	33	49	82	48	24	7	5	12	14	
Bourque, Rene	(Canada)	RW	2014–2015	30	2	6	8	12	—	—	—	—	—	
Boynton, Nick	(Canada)	D	2009–2010	42	1	6	7	59	—	—	—	—	—	
Brennan, Kip	(Canada)	LW	2005–2006	12	0	1	1	35	—	—	—	—	—	
Brent, Tim	(Canada)	C	2006–2007	15	1	0	1	6	—	—	—	—	—	
Brewer, Eric	(Canada)	D	2014–2015	9	1	1	2	6	—	—	—	—	—	
Brimanis, Aris	(United States)	D	2001–2002	5	0	0	0	9	—	—	—	—	—	
Brookbank, Sheldon	(Canada)	D	2008–2012	215	4	23	27	300	17	0	0	0	32	
Brown, J. T.	(United States)	RW	2017–2018	23	1	2	3	12	4	0	0	0	0	
Brown, Mike	(Canada)	LW	2002–2003	16	1	1	2	44	—	—	—	—	—	
Brown, Mike S.	(United States)	RW	2008–2010	103	8	2	10	166	13	0	2	2	25	
Burnett, Garrett	(Canada)	LW	2003–2004	39	1	2	3	184	—	—	—	—	—	
Butsayev, Vyacheslav	(Russia)	C	1995–1996	7	1	0	1	0	—	—	—	—	—	
Bylsma, Dan	(United States)	LW	2000–2004	209	10	22	32	62	11	0	1	1	2	
Calder, Kyle	(Canada)	LW	2009–2010	14	0	2	2	8	—	—	—	—	—	
Campbell, Jim	(United States)	RW	1995–1996	16	2	3	5	36	—	—	—	—	—	
Carlson, John	(United States)	D	2025–2026	16	4	10	14	6	12	0	6	6	4	
Carlsson, Leo	(Sweden)	C	2023–2026	201	61	80	141	63	12	4	7	11	0	
Carnback, Patrik	(Sweden)	RW	1993–1996	148	24	38	62	120	—	—	—	—	—	
Carney, Keith	(United States)	D	2001–2006	271	13	48	61	185	21	0	4	4	16	
Carrick, Sam	(Canada)	C	2018–2024	205	25	21	46	291	—	—	—	—	—	
Carter, Ryan	(United States)	C	2006–2011	138	12	17	29	141	20	2	3	5	6	SC 2007
Chimera, Jason	(Canada)	LW	2017–2018	16	1	1	2	2	2	0	0	0	0	
Chipchura, Kyle	(Canada)	C	2009–2011	95	6	8	14	88	—	—	—	—	—	
Chistov, Stanislav	(Russia)	RW	2002–2004; 2006–2007	136	14	34	48	80	21	4	2	6	8	
Chouinard, Marc	(Canada)	C	2000–2003	159	10	13	23	62	15	1	0	1	0	
Christensen, Erik	(Canada)	C	2008–2010	26	2	7	9	8	8	0	2	2	0	
Clark, Mat	(United States)	D	2011–2012	2	0	0	0	0	—	—	—	—	—	
Cogliano, Andrew	(Canada)	LW	2011–2019	584	102	131	233	170	64	8	17	25	27	
Colangelo, Sam	(United States)	RW	2023–2026	44	12	2	14	8	—	—	—	—	—	
Comtois, Max	(Canada)	LW	2018–2023	210	38	48	86	193	—	—	—	—	—	
Corkum, Bob	(United States)	C	1993–1996	168	38	44	82	69	—	—	—	—	—	
Cracknell, Adam	(Canada)	RW	2018–2019	2	0	0	0	0	—	—	—	—	—	
Cramarossa, Joseph	(Canada)	C	2016–2017	49	4	6	10	51	—	—	—	—	—	
Crowley, Mike	(United States)	D	1997–1999; 2000–2001	67	5	15	20	44	—	—	—	—	—	
Cullen, Matt	(United States)	C	1997–2003	427	65	135	200	168	4	0	0	0	0	
Cummins, Jim	(United States)	RW	2000–2002	81	5	6	11	167	-	-	-	-	-	
Daigneault, J. J.	(Canada)	D	1996–1998	66	4	24	28	50	11	2	7	9	16	
Davidsson, Johan	(Sweden)	C	1998–2000	69	4	5	9	16	1	0	0	0	0	
De Leo, Chase	(United States)	C	2018–2021	3	0	0	0	0	—	—	—	—	—	
Del Zotto, Michael	(Canada)	D	2018–2020	61	2	16	18	14	—	—	—	—	—	
Deslauriers, Nicolas	(Canada)	LW	2019–2022	169	17	16	33	235	—	—	—	—	—	
Despres, Simon	(Canada)	D	2014–2017	49	1	9	10	30	23	1	6	7	12	
DiPenta, Joe	(Canada)	D	2005–2008	171	5	16	21	110	32	0	0	0	17	SC 2007
Dirk, Robert	(Canada)	D	1994–1996	82	2	5	7	98	—	—	—	—	—	
Djoos, Christian	(Sweden)	D	2019–2020	9	1	2	3	0	—	—	—	—	—	
Dollas, Bobby	(Canada)	D	1993–1998	305	28	61	89	213	11	0	0	0	4	
Donato, Ted	(United States)	LW	1999–2000	81	11	19	30	26	—	—	—	—	—	
Dotchin, Jake	(Canada)	D	2018–2019	20	0	1	1	39	—	—	—	—	—	
Douris, Peter	(Canada)	RW	1993–1996	151	30	40	70	42	—	—	—	—	—	
Drew, Hunter	(Canada)	D	2021–2022	2	0	0	0	5	—	—	—	—	—	
Drury, Ted	(United States)	C	1996–2000	232	21	26	47	225	14	1	0	1	4	
Drysdale, Jamie	(Canada)	D	2020–2024	123	8	37	45	28	—	—	—	—	—	
Dumoulin, Brian	(United States)	D	2024–2025	61	2	14	16	10	—	—	—	—	—	
Dvorak, Radek	(Czech Republic)	RW	2012–2013	9	4	0	4	2	—	—	—	—	—	
Eaves, Patrick	(Canada)	RW	2016–2020	29	12	3	15	12	7	2	2	4	6	
Ebbett, Andrew	(Canada)	C	2007–2010	53	8	24	32	26	13	1	2	3	8	
Eminger, Steve	(Canada)	D	2009–2010	63	4	12	16	30	—	—	—	—	—	
Etem, Emerson	(United States)	RW	2012–2015; 2016–2017	112	15	16	31	17	23	6	2	8	14	
Ewen, Todd	(Canada)	RW	1993–1996	153	13	12	25	647	—	—	—	—	—	
Fabbri, Robby	(Canada)	C	2024–2025	44	8	8	16	20	—	—	—	—	—	
Fedorov, Sergei	(Russia)	C	2003–2006	85	31	35	66	44	—	—	—	—	—	HHOF 2015
Fedoruk, Todd	(Canada)	LW	2005–2007	86	4	22	26	210	12	0	0	0	16	
Fedotov, Anatoli	(Russia)	D	1993–1994	3	0	0	0	0	—	—	—	—	—	
Ferguson, Scott	(Canada)	D	1998–1999	2	0	1	1	0	—	—	—	—	—	
Ferner, Mark	(Canada)	D	1993–1995	64	3	6	9	36	—	—	—	—	—	
Festerling, Brett	(Canada)	D	2008–2011	83	0	8	8	33	1	0	0	0	0	
Fiore, Giovanni	(Canada)	LW	2017–2018	1	0	0	0	0	—	—	—	—	—	
Fistric, Mark	(Canada)	D	2013–2015	43	1	4	5	32	5	0	0	0	6	
Fleischmann, Tomas	(Czech Republic)	LW	2014–2015	14	1	5	6	4	6	0	1	1	0	
Fleury, Haydn	(Canada)	D	2020–2021	12	2	1	3	2	—	—	—	—	—	
Foster, Kurtis	(Canada)	D	2011–2012	9	1	1	2	8	—	—	—	—	—	
Fowler, Cam	(United States)	D	2010–2025	991	96	361	457	261	62	6	27	33	14	
Friesen, Jeff	(Canada)	LW	2000–2002; 2005–2006	114	20	39	59	62	16	3	1	4	6	
Friberg, Max	(Sweden)	LW	2014–2016	6	0	0	0	2	—	—	—	—	—	
Garbutt, Ryan	(Canada)	C	2015–2017	64	7	4	11	41	7	1	0	1	6	
Gaucher, Nathan	(Canada)	C	2025–2026	3	0	0	0	0	—	—	—	—	—	
Gauthier, Cutter	(United States)	LW	2023–2026	159	61	53	114	48	12	4	8	12	4	
Gawdin, Glenn	(Canada)	C	2022–2024	4	0	0	0	2	—	—	—	—	—	
Gavey, Aaron	(Canada)	C	2005–2006	5	0	0	0	2	—	—	—	—	—	
Getzlaf, Ryan	(Canada)	C	2005–2022	1157	282	737	1019	960	125	37	83	120	137	SC 2007
Gibbons, Brian	(United States)	C	2018–2019	44	2	3	5	16	—	—	—	—	—	
Gillies, Trevor	(Canada)	LW	2005–2006	1	0	0	0	21	—	—	—	—	—	
Glencross, Curtis	(Canada)	LW	2006–2007	2	1	0	1	2	—	—	—	—	—	
Gordon, Andrew	(Canada)	RW	2011–2012	37	2	3	5	6	—	—	—	—	—	
Granlund, Mikael	(Finland)	C	2025–2026	58	19	22	41	18	12	5	5	10	4	
Grant, Alex	(Canada)	D	2013–2014	2	2	0	2	2	—	—	—	—	—	
Grant, Derek	(Canada)	C	2017–2018; 2019–2023	309	54	61	115	125	4	0	0	0	0	
Green, Josh	(Canada)	C	2008–2009; 2010–2011	12	0	0	0	6	5	0	0	0	0	
Green, Travis	(Canada)	C	1997–1999; 2006–2007	108	19	29	48	103	4	0	1	1	4	
Grimson, Stu	(Canada)	LW	1993–1995; 1998–2000	231	5	8	13	583	3	0	0	0	30	
Groulx, Benoit-Olivier	(Canada)	C	2021–2024	65	1	4	5	24	—	—	—	—	—	
Gudas, Radko	(Czech Republic)	D	2023–2026	203	9	38	47	281	1	0	0	0	0	
Gudbranson, Erik	(Canada)	D	2019–2020	44	4	5	9	91	—	—	—	—	—	
Guenin, Nate	(United States)	D	2011–2012	15	2	0	2	6	—	—	—	—	—	
Guhle, Brendan	(Canada)	D	2018–2022	42	4	5	9	12	—	—	—	—	—	
Hagelin, Carl	(Sweden)	LW	2015–2016	43	4	8	14	—	—	—	—	—	—	
Hagg, Robert	(Sweden)	D	2023–2024	5	0	0	0	4	—	—	—	—	—	
Hagman, Niklas	(Finland)	LW	2011–2012	63	8	11	19	12	—	—	—	—	—	
Hakanpaa, Jani	(Finland)	D	2019–2021	47	1	1	2	33	—	—	—	—	—	
Haller, Kevin	(Canada)	D	1998–2000	149	4	11	15	183	4	0	0	0	2	
Hankinson, Casey	(United States)	LW	2003–2004	4	0	0	0	4	—	—	—	—	—	
Harkins, Jansen	(United States)	C	2024–2026	106	5	9	14	49	3	1	0	1	0	
Harrington, Scott	(Canada)	D	2022–2023	17	3	1	4	2	—	—	—	—	—	
Hartigan, Mark	(Canada)	C	2006–2007	6	0	0	0	4	1	0	0	0	0	
Havelid, Niclas	(Sweden)	D	1999–2004	310	24	61	85	152	21	0	4	4	2	
Heatley, Dany	(Canada)	LW	2014–2015	6	0	0	0	0	—	—	—	—	—	
Hedican, Bret	(United States)	D	2008–2009	51	1	5	6	36	—	—	—	—	—	
Hedstrom, Jonathan	(Sweden)	RW	2002–2003; 2005–2006	83	13	14	27	48	3	0	1	1	2	
Heinen, Danton	(Canada)	LW	2019–2021	52	10	8	18	2	—	—	—	—	—	
Helleson, Drew	(United States)	D	2022–2026	119	7	22	29	69	8	0	1	1	2	
Hendry, Jordan	(Canada)	D	2012–2013	2	0	0	0	0	—	—	—	—	—	
Henrique, Adam	(Canada)	C	2017–2024	435	135	129	264	140	4	0	0	0	0	
Hicks, Alex	(Canada)	LW	1995–1997	82	12	17	29	51	—	—	—	—	—	
Hill, Sean	(United States)	D	1993–1994	68	7	20	27	78	—	—	—	—	—	
Hinds, Tyson	(Canada)	D	2025–2026	6	0	0	0	2	9	0	1	1	0	
Hnidy, Shane	(Canada)	D	2007–2008	33	1	2	3	30	—	—	—	—	—	
Holan, Milos	(Czech Republic)	D	1994–1996	41	4	10	14	38	—	—	—	—	—	
Holland, Peter	(Canada)	C	2011–2014	29	5	2	7	8	—	—	—	—	—	
Holmqvist, Michael	(Sweden)	C	2003–2004	21	2	0	2	25	—	—	—	—	—	
Holzer, Korbinian	(Germany)	D	2015–2020	145	4	14	18	82	5	0	0	0	18	
Horcoff, Shawn	(Canada)	C	2015–2016	59	6	9	15	34	5	0	1	1	3	
Houda, Doug	(Canada)	D	1997–1998	24	1	2	3	52	—	—	—	—	—	
Houlder, Bill	(Canada)	D	1993–1994	80	14	25	39	40	—	—	—	—	—	
Hrkac, Tony	(Canada)	C	1999–2001	140	17	32	49	37	—	—	—	—	—	
Huskins, Kent	(Canada)	D	2006–2009	142	6	22	28	100	27	0	2	2	13	SC 2007
Irwin, Matt	(Canada)	D	2019–2020	9	0	1	1	4	—	—	—	—	—	
Jackman, Ric	(Canada)	D	2006–2007	24	1	10	11	10	7	1	1	2	2	SC 2007
Jackman, Tim	(United States)	RW	2013–2016	83	8	3	11	152	9	0	0	0	12	
Jacques, Jean-Francois	(Canada)	LW	2011–2012	6	0	0	0	12	—	—	—	—	—	
Janssens, Mark	(Canada)	C	1996–1998	67	4	7	11	163	11	0	0	0	15	
Johnston, Ross	(Canada)	LW	2023–2026	173	5	17	22	296	5	0	0	0	4	
Johnson, Craig	(United States)	LW	2003–2004	39	1	2	3	14	—	—	—	—	—	
Jomphe, Jean-Francois	(Canada)	C	1995–1998	104	10	29	39	100	—	—	—	—	—	
Jones, Max	(United States)	LW	2018–2024	258	31	31	62	211	—	—	—	—	—	
Jonsson, Jorgen	(Sweden)	C	1999–2000	13	1	2	3	0	—	—	—	—	—	
Kariya, Paul	(Canada)	LW	1994–2003	606	300	369	669	213	35	14	15	29	10	HHOF 2017; Ret #9
Karlsson, William	(Sweden)	C	2014–2015	18	2	1	3	2	—	—	—	—	—	
Karpa, Dave	(Canada)	D	1994–1998	245	7	43	50	788	8	1	1	2	20	
Karpov, Valeri	(Russia)	D	1994–1997	76	14	15	29	32	—	—	—	—	—	
Kasatonov, Alexei	(Russia)	D	1993–1994	55	4	18	22	43	—	—	—	—	—	
Kase, Ondrej	(Czech Republic)	RW	2016–2020	198	43	53	96	44	13	2	0	2	4	
Kelly, Chris	(Canada)	C/LW	2017–2018	12	0	2	2	2	—	—	—	—	—	
Kerdiles, Nicolas	(United States)	LW	2016–2018	3	0	0	0	0	4	0	1	1	2	
Kesler, Ryan	(United States)	C	2014–2019	346	76	104	180	326	44	12	15	27	62	
Kilger, Chad	(Canada)	LW	1995–1996	45	5	7	12	22	—	—	—	—	—	
Killorn, Alex	(Canada)	C/LW	2023–2026	227	52	54	106	124	12	4	5	9	8	
Kindopp, Bryce	(Canada)	F	2021–2022	1	0	0	0	0	—	—	—	—	—	
King, Jason	(Canada)	RW	2007–2008	4	0	0	0	0	—	—	—	—	—	
King, Steven	(United States)	RW	1993–1994; 1995–1996	43	10	3	13	59	—	—	—	—	—	
Kirkland, Justin	(Canada)	LW	2022–2023	7	0	0	0	0	—	—	—	—	—	
Kjellberg, Patric	(Sweden)	D	2001–2003	141	15	19	34	26	10	0	0	0	0	
Klee, Ken	(United States)	D	2008–2009	3	0	0	0	4	—	—	—	—	—	
Klingberg, John	(Sweden)	D	2022–2023	50	8	16	24	30	—	—	—	—	—	
Kloos, Justin	(United States)	C	2018–2019	1	0	0	0	0	—	—	—	—	—	
Knutsen, Espen	(Norway)	D	1997–1998	19	3	0	3	6	—	—	—	—	—	
Kohn, Ladislav	(Czech Republic)	RW	1999–2001	128	9	19	28	69	—	—	—	—	—	
Koivu, Saku	(Finland)	C	2009–2014	332	64	127	191	186	26	2	9	11	20	
Kondratiev, Maxim	(Russia)	D	2007–2008	4	0	0	0	0	—	—	—	—	—	
Konopka, Zenon	(Canada)	C	2005–2006	23	4	3	7	48	—	—	—	—	—	
Kossila, Kalle	(Finland)	LW	2016–2019	19	2	1	3	4	—	—	—	—	—	
Kreider, Chris	(United States)	LW	2025–2026	75	22	28	50	34	12	2	5	7	0	
Krivokrasov, Sergei	(Russia)	RW	2001–2002	17	1	2	3	19	—	—	—	—	—	
Krog, Jason	(Canada)	C	2002–2004	147	16	27	43	28	21	3	1	4	4	
Krygier, Todd	(United States)	LW	1994–1996	95	20	39	59	80	—	—	—	—	—	
Kulikov, Dmitry	(Russia)	D	2022–2023	61	3	12	15	30	—	—	—	—	—	
Kunitz, Chris	(Canada)	LW	2003–2004; 2005–2009	313	81	111	192	297	35	4	12	16	35	SC 2007
Kurri, Jari	(Finland)	RW	1996–1997	82	13	22	35	12	11	1	2	3	4	HHOF 2001
Kurvers, Tom	(United States)	D	1994–1995	22	4	3	7	6	—	—	—	—	—	
Kylington, Oliver	(Sweden)	D	2024–2025	6	0	1	1	4	—	—	—	—	—	
LaCombe, Jackson	(United States)	D	2022–2026	230	26	92	118	71	12	1	9	10	4	
Ladouceur, Randy	(Canada)	D	1993–1996	188	4	16	20	157	—	—	—	—	—	
Lagesson, William	(Sweden)	D	2023–2024	10	0	0	0	13	—	—	—	—	—	
Lambert, Denny	(Canada)	LW	1994–1996; 2001–2002	119	3	16	19	272	—	—	—	—	—	
Lapierre, Maxim	(Canada)	C	2010–2011	21	0	3	3	9	—	—	—	—	—	
Larsson, Jacob	(Sweden)	D	2016–2022	165	3	21	24	46	—	—	—	—	—	
Leason, Brett	(Canada)	RW	2022–2025	184	22	26	48	50	—	—	—	—	—	
Lebeau, Stephan	(Canada)	C	1993–1995	60	14	20	34	26	—	—	—	—	—	
Leboutillier, Peter	(Canada)	RW	1996–1998	35	2	1	3	176	—	—	—	—	—	
Leclerc, Mike	(Canada)	LW	1996–2004	291	54	78	132	251	23	2	9	11	12	
Lettieri, Vinni	(United States)	C	2020–2022	36	5	5	10	6	—	—	—	—	—	
Liambas, Mike	(Canada)	LW	2017–2018	7	0	1	1	21	—	—	—	—	—	
Lilja, Andreas	(Sweden)	D	2010–2011	52	1	6	7	28	3	0	0	0	0	
Lilley, John	(United States)	C	1993–1996	23	3	8	11	13	—	—	—	—	—	
Lindholm, Hampus	(Sweden)	D	2013–2022	581	57	164	221	314	55	4	17	21	22	
Lindström, Gustav	(Sweden)	D	2023–2024	32	0	6	6	18	—	—	—	—	—	
Loach, Lonnie	(Canada)	LW	1993–1994	3	0	0	0	2	—	—	—	—	—	
Lombardi, Matthew	(Canada)	C	2012–2013	7	0	0	0	4	—	—	—	—	—	
Loney, Troy	(Canada)	LW	1993–1994	62	13	6	19	88	—	—	—	—	—	
Lovejoy, Ben	(United States)	D	2012–2015	150	6	33	39	85	20	2	2	4	8	
Lundestrom, Isac	(Sweden)	C	2018–2025	337	35	49	84	38	—	—	—	—	—	
Luneau, Tristan	(Canada)	D	2023–2026	14	2	2	4	6	—	—	—	—	—	
Lupul, Joffrey	(Canada)	RW	2003–2006; 2009–2011	205	56	58	114	94	16	9	2	11	31	
Lydman, Toni	(Finland)	D	2010–2013	187	3	41	44	100	9	0	0	0	2	
Lyubushkin, Ilya	(Russia)	D	2023–2024	55	0	4	4	51	—	—	—	—	—	
Macenauer, Maxime	(Canada)	C	2011–2012	29	1	3	4	18	—	—	—	—	—	
Mahura, Josh	(Canada)	D	2018–2022	79	6	14	20	22	—	—	—	—	—	
Manson, Josh	(United States)	D	2014–2022	453	26	87	113	431	22	0	3	3	20	
Mara, Paul	(United States)	D	2010–2011	33	1	1	2	40	—	—	—	—	—	
Marchant, Todd	(United States)	C	2005–2011	421	38	74	112	230	52	6	15	21	46	SC 2007
Marha, Josef	(Czech Republic)	C	1997–1999	22	7	5	12	0	—	—	—	—	—	
Maroon, Patrick	(United States)	LW	2011–2016	204	26	53	79	249	29	9	9	18	44	
Marshall, Jason	(Canada)	D	1994–2001	370	8	34	42	740	11	1	1	2	14	
Martensson, Tony	(Sweden)	C	2003–2004	6	1	1	2	0	—	—	—	—	—	
Maxwell, Ben	(Canada)	C	2011–2012	6	0	1	1	2	—	—	—	—	—	
May, Brad	(Canada)	LW	2006–2009	95	3	7	10	94	24	0	1	1	32	SC 2007
Mayhew, Gerald	(United States)	F	2021–2022	15	5	1	6	8	—	—	—	—	—	
McDonald, Andy	(Canada)	C	2000–2008	391	92	167	259	162	37	12	11	23	20	SC 2007
McGinn, Brock	(Canada)	LW	2022–2025	65	7	7	14	4	—	—	—	—	—	
McGinn, Jamie	(Canada)	C	2015–2016	21	8	4	12	23	7	2	0	2	2	
McInnis, Marty	(United States)	LW	1998–2002	272	57	88	145	127	4	2	0	2	2	
McIver, Nathan	(Canada)	D	2008–2009	18	0	1	1	36	—	—	—	—	—	
McKay, Scott	(Canada)	RW	1993–1994	1	0	0	0	0	—	—	—	—	—	
McKenzie, Jim	(Canada)	LW	1998–2000	104	8	7	15	147	4	0	0	0	4	
McMillan, Brandon	(Canada)	C	2010–2013	91	11	15	26	40	6	1	1	2	0	
McSween, Don	(United States)	D	1993–1996	38	3	9	12	43	—	—	—	—	—	
McTavish, Mason	(Canada)	C	2021–2026	304	77	104	181	212	10	1	5	6	2	
Megna, Jaycob	(United States)	D	2016–2019	43	1	4	5	14	—	—	—	—	—	
Megna, Jayson	(United States)	C	2022–2023	41	2	6	8	4	—	—	—	—	—	
Melin, Bjorn	(Sweden)	RW	2006–2007	3	1	0	1	0	—	—	—	—	—	
Meyers, Ben	(United States)	F	2023–2024	14	0	2	2	6	—	—	—	—	—	
Mikkelson, Brendan	(Canada)	D	2008–2011	67	0	5	5	38	—	—	—	—	—	
Mikulchik, Oleg	(Belarus)	D	1995–1996	8	0	0	0	4	—	—	—	—	—	
Milano, Sonny	(United States)	LW	2019–2022	81	16	23	39	14	—	—	—	—	—	
Miller, Drew	(United States)	LW	2006–2009	53	6	9	15	23	16	2	1	3	4	SC 2007
Miller, Kip	(United States)	C	1999–2000	30	6	17	23	4	—	—	—	—	—	
Mintyukov, Pavel	(Russia)	D	2023–2026	204	17	52	69	61	12	0	0	0	4	
Mironov, Dmitri	(Russia)	D	1996–1998	128	18	64	82	192	11	1	10	11	10	
Moen, Travis	(Canada)	LW	2005–2009	261	22	23	45	331	36	9	6	15	34	SC 2007
Montador, Steve	(Canada)	D	2008–2009	65	4	16	20	125	—	—	—	—	—	
Montour, Brandon	(Canada)	D	2016–2019	169	16	47	63	96	21	0	8	8	10	
Moore, Ian	(United States)	D	2024–2026	70	4	9	13	24	10	1	0	1	2	
Moran, Ian	(United States)	D	2006–2007	1	0	0	0	0	—	—	—	—	—	
Moro, Marc	(Canada)	D	1997–1998	1	0	0	0	0	—	—	—	—	—	
Morrison, Brendan	(Canada)	C	2008–2009	62	10	12	22	16	—	—	—	—	—	
Motzko, Joe	(United States)	RW	2006–2007	—	—	—	—	—	3	0	0	0	2	SC 2007
Mowers, Mark	(United States)	RW	2007–2008	17	1	0	1	8	—	—	—	—	—	
Nazarov, Andrei	(Russia)	LW	2000–2001	16	1	0	1	29	—	—	—	—	—	
Nesterenko, Nikita	(United States)	C	2022–2026	61	7	10	17	10	—	—	—	—	—	
Nieckar, Barry	(Canada)	LW	1996–1998	3	0	0	0	7	—	—	—	—	—	
Niedermayer, Rob	(Canada)	C	2002–2009	382	56	68	124	311	73	9	18	27	79	SC 2007
Niedermayer, Scott	(Canada)	D	2005–2010	371	60	204	264	306	56	8	26	34	55	SC 2007; HHOF 2013; Ret #27
Nielsen, Jeff	(United States)	RW	1997–2000	191	17	19	36	64	4	0	0	0	2	
Niemi, Antti-Jussi	(Finland)	D	2000–2002	29	1	1	2	22	—	—	—	—	—	
Nikulin, Igor	(Russia)	RW	1996–1997	—	—	—	—	—	1	0	0	0	0	
Noesen, Stefan	(United States)	RW	2014–2017	14	2	0	2	2	—	—	—	—	—	
Nokelainen, Petteri	(Finland)	C	2008–2010	67	8	9	17	27	9	0	0	0	2	
Norris, Dwayne	(Canada)	RW	1995–1996	3	0	1	1	2	—	—	—	—	—	
O'Brien, Shane	(Canada)	D	2006–2007	62	2	12	14	140	—	—	—	—	—	
O'Connor, Myles	(Canada)	D	1993–1994	5	0	1	1	6	—	—	—	—	—	
O'Donnell, Sean	(Canada)	D	2005–2008	182	5	24	29	202	43	3	6	9	35	SC 2007
O'Marra, Ryan	(Canada)	C	2011–2012	2	0	0	0	0	—	—	—	—	—	
O'Regan, Danny	(United States)	C	2021–2022	5	0	1	1	0	—	—	—	—	—	
O'Sullivan, Chris	(United States)	D	2002–2003	2	0	1	1	0	—	—	—	—	—	
Oates, Adam	(Canada)	C	2002–2003	67	9	36	45	16	21	4	9	13	6	HHOF 2012
Oksiuta, Roman	(Russia)	RW	1995–1997	42	13	12	25	40	—	—	—	—	—	
Olausson, Fredrik	(Sweden)	D	1995–1997; 1998–2000; 2002–2003	244	37	90	127	112	5	0	2	2	4	
Oystrick, Nathan	(Canada)	D	2009–2010	3	0	0	0	2	—	—	—	—	—	
Ozolinsh, Sandis	(Latvia)	D	2002–2006	84	13	27	40	48	21	2	6	8	10	
Pahlsson, Samuel	(Sweden)	C	2000–2009	527	51	90	141	252	64	7	16	23	50	SC 2007
Palmieri, Kyle	(United States)	C	2010–2015	198	43	46	89	90	33	7	5	12	22	
Park, Richard	(United States)	RW	1996–1998	26	1	3	4	18	11	0	1	1	2	
Parros, George	(United States)	RW	2006–2012	356	15	13	28	812	19	0	0	0	35	SC 2007
Parssinen, Timo	(Finland)	LW	2001–2002	17	0	3	3	2	—	—	—	—	—	
Pateryn, Greg	(United States)	D	2021–2022	10	1	1	2	10	—	—	—	—	—	
Pelley, Rod	(Canada)	C	2011–2012	45	2	1	3	9	—	—	—	—	—	
Penner, Dustin	(Canada)	LW	2005–2007; 2013–2014	150	46	38	84	72	34	6	11	17	14	SC 2007
Perron, David	(Canada)	C	2015–2016	28	8	12	20	34	7	1	2	3	8	
Perry, Corey	(Canada)	RW	2005–2019	988	372	404	776	1110	118	36	53	89	186	SC 2007
Perreault, Jacob	(Canada)	RW	2021–2022	1	0	0	0	0	—	—	—	—	—	
Perreault, Mathieu	(Canada)	C	2013–2014	69	18	25	43	36	11	2	3	5	18	
Pettersson, Marcus	(Sweden)	D	2017–2019	49	1	9	10	23	4	0	0	0	2	
Pirri, Brandon	(Canada)	C	2015–2016	9	3	2	5	0	—	—	—	—	—	
Platt, Geoff	(Canada)	C	2007–2008	5	0	0	0	2	—	—	—	—	—	
Plavsic, Adrien	(Canada)	D	1996–1997	6	0	0	0	2	—	—	—	—	—	
Poehling, Ryan	(United States)	C	2025–2026	75	11	25	36	12	11	4	1	5	4	
Popovic, Mark	(Canada)	D	2003–2004	1	0	0	0	0	—	—	—	—	—	
Pronger, Chris	(Canada)	D	2006–2009	220	36	114	150	285	38	7	23	30	50	SC 2007; HHOF 2015
Pronger, Sean	(Canada)	C	1995–1998	108	12	23	35	56	9	0	2	2	4	
Prospal, Vaclav	(Czech Republic)	C	2003–2004	82	19	35	54	54	—	—	—	—	—	
Pushor, Jamie	(Canada)	D	1997–1999	80	1	4	5	122	4	0	0	0	6	
Rakell, Rickard	(Sweden)	LW	2012–2022	550	154	185	339	116	46	11	8	19	2	
Rasmussen, Dennis	(Sweden)	C	2017–2018	27	1	3	4	8	—	—	—	—	—	
Raymond, Mason	(Canada)	LW	2016–2017	4	0	0	0	0	—	—	—	—	—	
Regenda, Pavol	(Slovakia)	F	2022–2024	19	1	2	3	6	—	—	—	—	—	
Reichert, Craig	(Canada)	RW	1996–1997	3	0	0	0	0	—	—	—	—	—	
Ritchie, Nick	(Canada)	LW	2015–2020	287	43	66	109	331	19	4	0	4	54	
Robak, Colby	(Canada)	D	2014–2015	5	0	1	1	0	—	—	—	—	—	
Robidas, Stephane	(Canada)	D	2013–2014	14	1	4	5	8	3	0	0	0	2	
Robinson, Buddy	(United States)	RW	2021–2022	32	1	5	6	19	—	—	—	—	—	
Rome, Aaron	(Canada)	D	2006–2007	1	0	0	0	0	1	0	0	0	0	
Ronnqvist, Jonas	(Sweden)	RW	2000–2001	38	0	4	4	14	—	—	—	—	—	
Rowney, Carter	(Canada)	C	2018–2021	152	15	30	45	28	—	—	—	—	—	
Roy, Kevin	(Canada)	C	2017–2019	28	6	1	7	6	—	—	—	—	—	
Rucchin, Steve	(Canada)	C	1994–2004	616	153	279	432	140	33	8	8	16	12	
Ruutu, Jarkko	(Finland)	LW	2010–2011	23	1	1	2	38	3	0	0	0	12	
Ryan, Bobby	(United States)	RW	2007–2013	378	147	142	289	251	26	10	5	15	4	
Rychel, Warren	(Canada)	RW	1996–1998	133	15	13	28	416	11	0	2	2	19	
Sacco, David	(United States)	LW	1994–1996	31	4	12	16	18	—	—	—	—	—	
Sacco, Joe	(United States)	LW	1993–1998	333	62	68	130	183	11	2	0	2	2	
Salcido, Brian	(United States)	D	2008–2009	2	0	1	1	0	—	—	—	—	—	
Salei, Ruslan	(Belarus)	D	1996–2006	594	26	79	105	735	40	5	5	10	48	
Sandstrom, Tomas	(Sweden)	RW	1997–1999	135	24	25	49	106	4	0	0	0	4	
Santorelli, Mike	(Canada)	C	2015–2016	70	9	9	18	8	—	—	—	—	—	
Sauer, Kurt	(United States)	D	2002–2004	135	2	6	8	106	21	1	1	2	6	
Sawyer, Kevin	(Canada)	LW	2000–2003	97	3	3	6	363	—	—	—	—	—	
Sbisa, Luca	(Switzerland)	D	2009–2014	227	9	40	49	181	13	0	2	2	17	
Schastlivy, Petr	(Russia)	LW	2003–2004	22	2	0	2	4	—	—	—	—	—	
Schenn, Luke	(Canada)	D	2018–2019	8	0	0	0	7	—	—	—	—	—	
Schneider, Mathieu	(United States)	D	2007–2008	65	12	27	39	50	6	1	0	1	8	
Sekac, Jiri	(Czech Republic)	LW	2014–2016	41	3	7	10	8	7	0	0	0	2	
Selanne, Teemu	(Finland)	RW	1995–2001; 2005–2014	966	457	531	988	471	96	35	34	69	54	SC 2007; HHOF 2017; Ret #8
Semenov, Anatoli	(Russia)	C	1993–1996	76	15	32	47	26	—	—	—	—	—	
Sennecke, Beckett	(Canada)	F	2025–2026	82	23	37	60	62	12	5	1	6	4	
Severson, Cam	(Canada)	LW	2002–2004	33	3	0	3	58	1	0	0	0	0	
Severyn, Brent	(Canada)	LW	1997–1998	37	1	3	4	133	—	—	—	—	—	
Sexton, Dan	(United States)	LW	2009–2011	41	9	10	19	16	1	0	0	0	2	
Sgarbossa, Michael	(Canada)	C	2015–2017	10	0	2	2	0	—	—	—	—	—	
Shannon, Ryan	(United States)	RW	2006–2007	88	13	19	32	20	11	0	0	0	6	SC 2007
Sharp, MacGregor	(Canada)	C	2009–2010	8	0	0	0	0	—	—	—	—	—	
Shattenkirk, Kevin	(United States)	D	2020–2023	212	14	63	77	120	—	—	—	—	—	
Shaw, Logan	(Canada)	RW	2016–2018	97	5	13	18	14	9	0	0	0	4	
Sherwood, Kiefer	(United States)	RW	2018–2020	60	6	7	13	14	—	—	—	—	—	
Shore, Devin	(Canada)	C	2018–2020	73	9	13	22	14	—	—	—	—	—	
Silfverberg, Jakob	(Sweden)	RW	2013–2024	772	158	196	354	252	57	16	20	36	33	
Sillinger, Mike	(Canada)	C	1994–1996	77	15	26	41	38	—	—	—	—	—	
Simon, Dominik	(Czech Republic)	C	2021–2022	17	0	4	4	6	—	—	—	—	—	
Simpson, Todd	(Canada)	D	2003–2004	46	4	3	7	105	—	—	—	—	—	
Skalde, Jarrod	(Canada)	C	1993–1994	20	5	4	9	10	—	—	—	—	—	
Skoula, Martin	(Czech Republic)	D	2003–2004	21	2	7	9	2	—	—	—	—	—	
Smirnov, Alexei	(Russia)	LW	2002–2004	52	3	3	6	20	4	0	0	0	2	
Smith-Pelly, Devante	(Canada)	RW	2011–2015	129	14	26	40	30	12	5	0	5	24	
Sorensen, Nick	(Denmark)	RW	2016–2017	5	0	1	1	2	—	—	—	—	—	
Souray, Sheldon	(Canada)	D	2012–2013	44	7	10	17	52	6	0	1	1	4	
Sprong, Daniel	(Canada)	RW	2018–2020	55	15	6	21	10	—	—	—	—	—	
St. Jacques, Bruno	(Canada)	D	2005–2006	1	1	0	1	0	—	—	—	—	—	
Staubitz, Brad	(Canada)	RW	2012–2013	15	1	1	2	41	—	—	—	—	—	
Steckel, David	(United States)	C	2012–2014	27	1	5	6	4	7	1	1	2	0	
Steel, Sam	(Canada)	C	2018–2022	197	24	41	65	52	—	—	—	—	—	
Stevenson, Jeremy	(United States)	LW	1995–1998; 1999–2000	56	3	6	9	134	—	—	—	—	—	
Stewart, Chris	(Canada)	RW	2014–2016	56	8	12	20	73	7	1	2	3	0	
Stoner, Clayton	(Canada)	D	2014–2017	133	3	14	17	163	17	1	0	1	10	
Strand, Austin	(Canada)	D	2022–2023	5	0	0	0	2	—	—	—	—	—	
Street, Ben	(Canada)	C	2018–2019	21	3	2	5	2	—	—	—	—	—	
Strome, Ryan	(Canada)	C	2022–2026	276	39	93	132	262	—	—	—	—	—	
Sustr, Andrej	(Czech Republic)	D	2018–2019; 2021–2022	28	0	5	5	16	—	—	—	—	—	
Sutherby, Brian	(Canada)	C	2007–2009	62	3	4	7	76	5	0	0	0	2	
Sutton, Andy	(Canada)	D	2010–2011	39	0	4	4	87	1	0	0	0	2	
Sweeney, Tim	(United States)	RW	1993–1995	91	17	28	45	51	—	—	—	—	—	
Sykora, Petr	(Czech Republic)	RW	2002–2006	197	64	67	131	86	21	4	9	13	12	
Syvret, Danny	(Canada)	D	2010–2011	6	1	1	2	4	—	—	—	—	—	
Tenkrat, Petr	(Czech Republic)	RW	2000–2002	55	5	9	14	22	—	—	—	—	—	
Terry, Troy	(United States)	RW	2017–2026	488	135	207	342	132	12	3	8	11	0	
Theodore, Shea	(Canada)	D	2015–2017	53	5	12	17	30	20	2	6	8	4	
Thomas, Steve	(Canada)	RW	2002–2003	12	10	3	13	2	21	4	4	8	8	
Thompson, Nate	(United States)	C	2014–2017	159	9	17	26	100	36	6	8	14	14	
Thomson, Jim	(Canada)	RW	1993–1994	6	0	0	0	5	—	—	—	—	—	
Thornton, Shawn	(Canada)	LW	2006–2007	48	2	7	9	88	15	0	0	0	19	SC 2007
Titov, German	(Russia)	C	2000–2002	137	22	25	47	97	—	—	—	—	—	
Todd, Kevin	(Canada)	C	1996–1998	92	13	28	41	56	4	0	0	0	2	
Tracey, Brayden	(Canada)	LW	2021–2022	1	0	0	0	0	—	—	—	—	—	
Traverse, Patrick	(Canada)	D	2000–2001	15	1	0	1	6	—	—	—	—	—	
Trebil, Dan	(United States)	D	1996–1999	56	3	4	7	25	10	0	1	1	8	
Trepanier, Pascal	(Canada)	D	1998–2001	139	8	12	20	175	—	—	—	—	—	
Trnka, Pavel	(Czech Republic)	D	1997–2003	322	11	47	58	248	4	0	1	1	2	
Tropp, Corey	(United States)	RW	2016–2017	1	0	0	0	0	—	—	—	—	—	
Trouba, Jacob	(United States)	D	2024–2026	134	11	32	43	75	12	1	0	1	4	
Tsulygin, Nikolai	(Russia)	D	1996–1997	22	0	1	1	8	—	—	—	—	—	
Tuzzolino, Tony	(United States)	RW	1997–1998	1	0	0	0	2	—	—	—	—	—	
Tverdovsky, Oleg	(Russia)	D	1994–1996; 1999–2002	324	45	125	170	142	—	—	—	—	—	
Vaakanainen, Urho	(Finland)	D	2021–2025	110	1	18	19	34	—	—	—	—	—	
Valicevic, Rob	(United States)	RW	2002–2003	10	1	0	1	2	—	—	—	—	—	
Valk, Garry	(Canada)	LW	1993–1997	246	40	52	92	312	—	—	—	—	—	
Van Allen, Shaun	(Canada)	C	1993–1996	174	24	63	87	137	—	—	—	—	—	
Van Impe, Darren	(Canada)	D	1994–1998	110	6	25	31	112	9	0	2	2	16	
Vatanen, Sami	(Finland)	D	2012–2018	280	33	93	126	116	40	5	17	22	18	
Vatrano, Frank	(United States)	LW	2022–2026	294	85	70	155	271	—	—	—	—	—	
Vermette, Antoine	(Canada)	C	2016–2018	136	17	27	44	76	19	1	2	3	2	
Viel, Jeffrey	(Canada)	F	2025–2026	35	3	7	10	49	12	2	2	4	17	
Vishnevski, Vitaly	(Russia)	D	1999–2006	416	11	37	48	403	37	0	5	5	16	
Visnovsky, Lubomir	(Slovakia)	D	2009–2012	165	29	79	108	75	6	0	3	3	2	
Volkov, Alexander	(Russia)	RW	2020–2021	18	4	4	8	2	—	—	—	—	—	
Voros, Aaron	(Canada)	LW	2010–2011	12	0	0	0	43	—	—	—	—	—	
Wagner, Chris	(United States)	RW	2014–2018	133	12	12	24	62	21	3	0	3	6	
Ward, Aaron	(Canada)	D	2009–2010	17	0	2	2	8	—	—	—	—	—	
Ward, Ed	(Canada)	RW	1999–2000	8	1	0	1	15	—	—	—	—	—	
Ward, Lance	(Canada)	RW	2002–2004	75	0	5	5	137	—	—	—	—	—	
Washe, Tim	(United States)	F	2024–2026	41	2	3	5	14	12	0	1	1	4	
Weight, Doug	(United States)	C	2007–2008	38	6	8	14	20	5	0	1	1	4	
White, Colton	(Canada)	D	2022–2023	46	0	6	6	8	—	—	—	—	—	
Whitney, Ryan	(United States)	D	2008–2010	102	4	44	48	72	13	1	5	6	9	
Welinski, Andy	(United States)	D	2017–2021	46	1	5	6	8	3	0	0	0	0	
Williams, David	(United States)	D	1993–1995	77	7	17	24	68	—	—	—	—	—	
Winchester, Brad	(United States)	LW	2010–2011	19	1	1	2	28	3	0	0	0	4	
Winnik, Daniel	(Canada)	C	2012–2014	124	12	37	49	39	16	0	2	2	9	
Wirtanen, Petteri	(Finland)	C	2007–2008	3	1	0	1	2	—	—	—	—	—	
Wisniewski, James	(United States)	D	2008–2010; 2014–2015	99	4	42	46	82	12	1	2	3	10	
Wren, Bob	(Canada)	LW	1997–1998; 2000–2001	4	0	0	0	0	—	—	—	—	—	
Wright, Tyler	(Canada)	C	2005–2006	25	2	2	4	31	—	—	—	—	—	
Yake, Terry	(Canada)	C	1993–1994	82	21	31	52	44	—	—	—	—	—	
Yonkman, Nolan	(Canada)	D	2013–2014	2	0	1	1	0	—	—	—	—	—	
York, Jason	(Canada)	D	1994–1996; 2001–2002	168	8	49	57	160	—	—	—	—	—	
Young, Scott	(United States)	RW	1997–1998	73	13	20	33	22	—	—	—	—	—	
Zegras, Trevor	(United States)	C	2020–2025	268	67	119	186	203	—	—	—	—	—	
Zellweger, Olen	(Canada)	D	2023–2026	164	16	35	51	58	3	1	1	2	0	
Zolnierczyk, Harry	(Canada)	LW	2015–2016	1	0	0	0	0	—	—	—	—	—	

== Notes ==
a: As of the 2005–2006 NHL season, all games will have a winner, teams losing in overtime and shootouts are awarded one point thus the OTL stat replacees the tie statistic. The OTL column also includes SOL (Shootout losses).
