= Patrick Eaves =

Canadian-born American ice hockey player

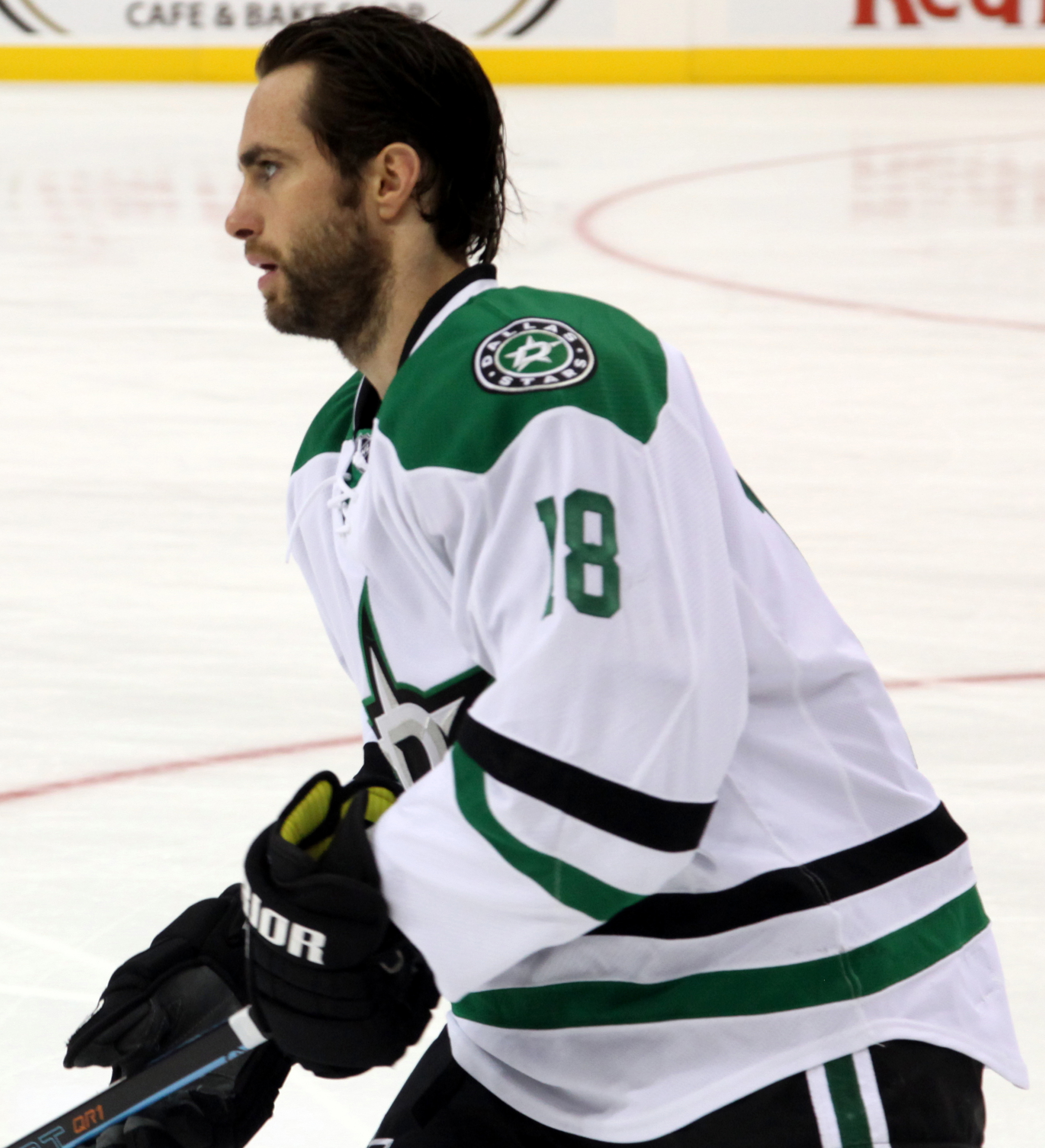
- Eaves with the Dallas Stars in October 2014
- Born: May 1, 1984 (age 42) Calgary, Alberta, Canada
- Height: 6 ft 0 in (183 cm)
- Weight: 187 lb (85 kg; 13 st 5 lb)
- Position: Right wing
- Shot: Right
- Played for: Ottawa Senators; Carolina Hurricanes; Detroit Red Wings; Nashville Predators; Dallas Stars; Anaheim Ducks
- NHL draft: 29th overall, 2003; Ottawa Senators
- Playing career: 2005–2019

Patrick Campbell Eaves (born May 1, 1984) is a Canadian-born American former professional ice hockey forward. He played in the National Hockey League (NHL) with the Ottawa Senators, Carolina Hurricanes, Detroit Red Wings, Nashville Predators, Dallas Stars and Anaheim Ducks.

Born in Calgary, Alberta, when his father, Mike was a member of the Calgary Flames, Eaves was raised in Faribault, Minnesota and holds both Canadian and American citizenship and represented the United States in international ice hockey tournaments.

== Playing career ==
=== Amateur ===
Eaves attended Shattuck-St Mary's School which is an Episcopal Church-affiliated boarding school in Faribault, Minnesota. He played his collegiate hockey at Boston College. After a very good freshman year the Senators drafted him 29th overall in the first round of the 2003 NHL entry draft. He played two more years with the Eagles, where he won several awards, including Hockey East Player of the Year, earned All-America and All-Conference first-team honors, and was a Hobey Baker Finalist. Also during that time he represented his country at the 2004 World Junior Ice Hockey Championships, tallied one goal and five assists in six games. In 2005, he decided to leave Boston College to sign with the Ottawa Senators.

=== Professional ===
==== Ottawa Senators ====
Eaves started the 2005–06 season with the Binghamton Senators in the AHL, and after a good start he was called up to Ottawa, hitting the 20 goal plateau in the NHL. The playoffs, however were a disappointment as they lost to the Buffalo Sabres in the second round.

In the 2006–07 season, Eaves recorded career highs in points (32) and assists (18) which included 10 points (6–4) in 13 games in January. In game three of the first round of the 2007 Stanley Cup playoffs on Sunday, April 15, 2007, Eaves took a violent shoulder check to the head after coming around the Penguins' net from Pittsburgh Penguins forward Colby Armstrong, causing him to be carried off the ice on a stretcher. He did not return to play the rest of the series. In the Eastern Conference finals against the Sabres, Eaves returned to the lineup in the series-deciding game five.

==== Carolina Hurricanes ====
In the 2007–08 season, Eaves spent much of the season injured. On February 11, 2008, the Senators traded Eaves along with Joe Corvo to the Carolina Hurricanes in exchange for Cory Stillman and Mike Commodore. On June 4, 2008, he signed a three-year contract with the Hurricanes worth $4.2 million.

In the 2008–09 season, Eaves saw his production drop, recording only six goals and eight assists in 74 games, battling shoulder injuries much of the season.

==== Detroit Red Wings ====
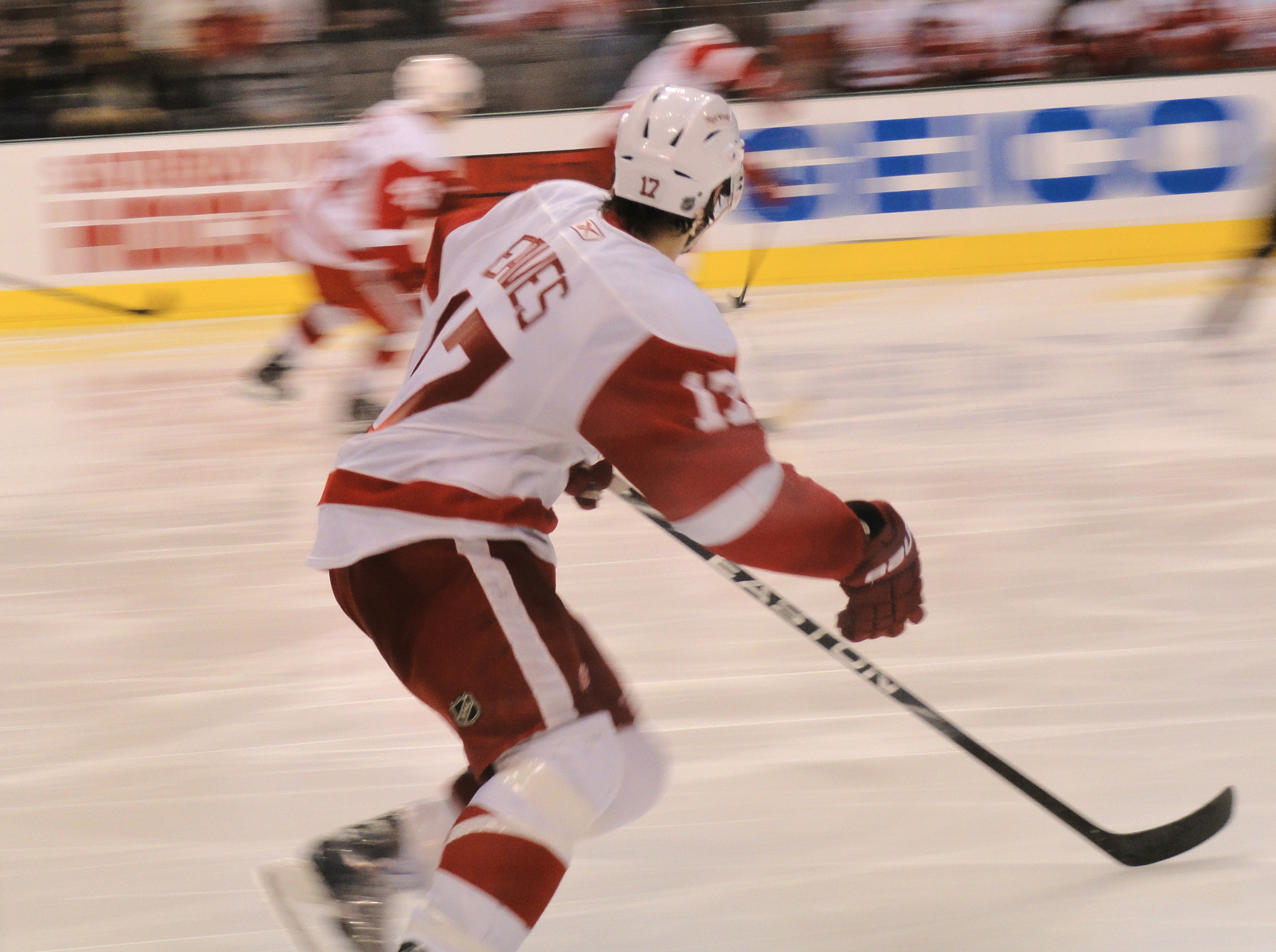
Eaves on his way to his first career hat-trick in a game vs. the Dallas Stars in December 2010.

On July 24, 2009, Eaves was traded by the Hurricanes to Boston Bruins along with a 2010 fourth-round draft pick in exchange for defenseman Aaron Ward. The Bruins then placed Eaves on waivers for the purpose of buying out his contract. On August 4, 2009, Eaves signed a one-year contract, valued at $500,000, with Detroit Red Wings. Eaves scored his first goal with the Red Wings in a 6–5 shootout loss to the Edmonton Oilers on October 29, 2009. In early January, 2010, he scored his 50th career goal against the San Jose Sharks.

On July 7, 2010, Eaves signed a one-year extension with the Red Wings.

On July 1, 2011, Eaves signed a three-year extension with the Red Wings. The deal was worth $3.6 million, and had a cap hit of $1.2 million per year.

Eaves played just ten games in the 2011–12 season before suffering a broken jaw and a concussion in a game against Nashville Predators on November 26, 2011. Predators defenceman Roman Josi's shot hit him in the side of the face; Eaves missed the rest of the season due to the concussion.

On October 29, 2012, Eaves stated he was "not close" to returning and was still suffering headaches and post-concussion symptoms from the previous year's injury. On January 18, 2013, the Red Wings announced that Eaves was cleared to return to play.

==== Nashville Predators ====
On March 5, 2014, Eaves was traded to Nashville Predators, along with Calle Järnkrok, as part of a deal that brought David Legwand to Detroit. Eaves played five scoreless games with the Predators to close the 2013–14 season.

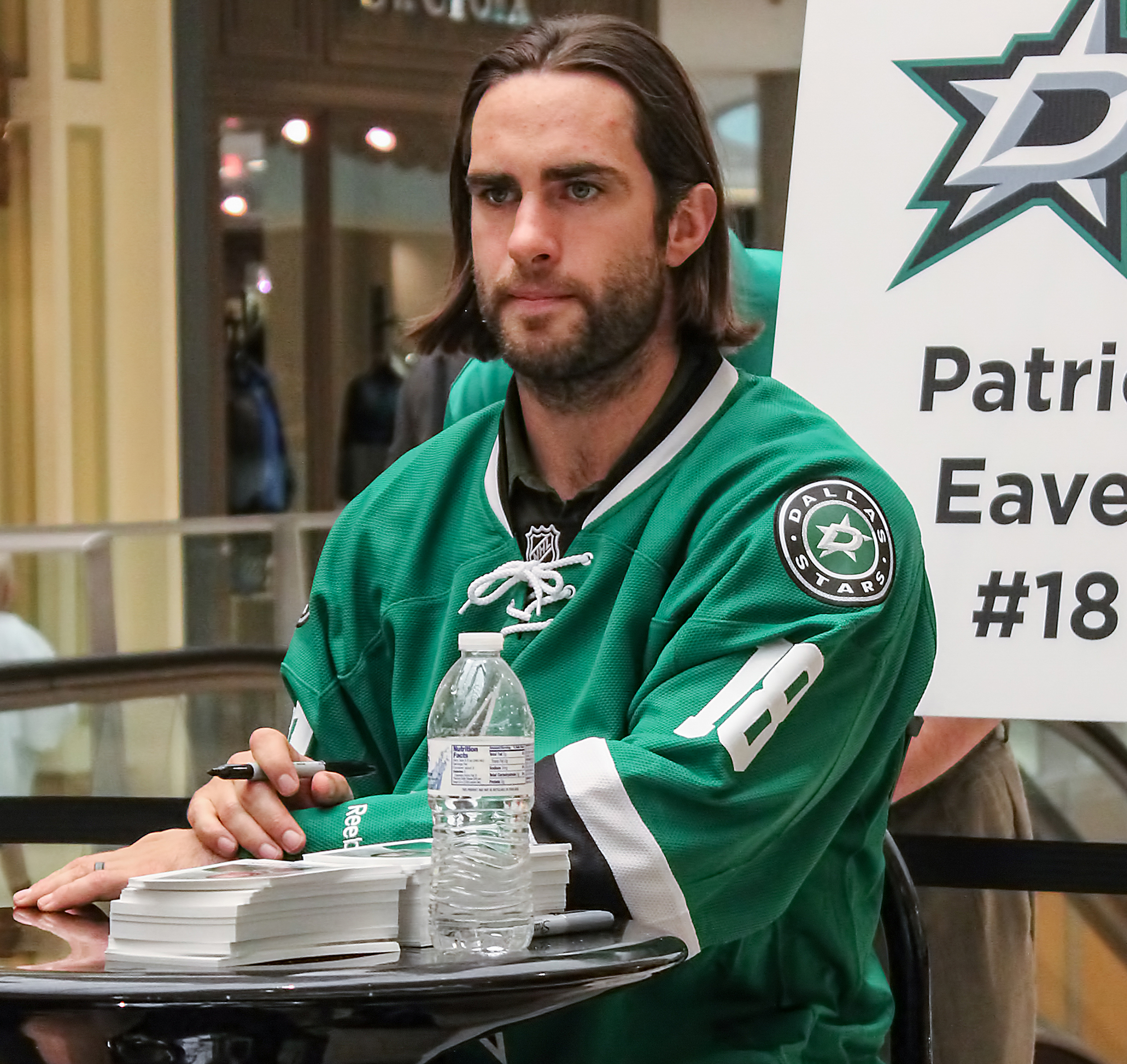
Eaves with the Dallas Stars signs autographs at Galleria Dallas in September 2014.

==== Dallas Stars ====
Eaves brief tenure with the Predators came to an end on July 1, 2014, when he signed as a free agent to a one-year deal with the Dallas Stars. On July 1, 2015, the Dallas Stars re-signed Eaves to a one-year contract.

In the midst of the 2016–17 season, his third and final year of contract with the Stars, Eaves had already established career highs with 21 goals and 37 points, playing on the top offensive line, alongside Jamie Benn and Tyler Seguin.

==== Anaheim Ducks ====
With the Stars languishing in the standings, on February 24, 2017, he was traded to the Anaheim Ducks in exchange for a conditional draft pick in 2017, which eventually became a first round pick. Upon arrival in Anaheim, Eaves picked up right where he left off with the Stars. He recorded 11 goals and three assists to put him well above his previous career best numbers. Eaves played in seven playoff games with the Ducks before suffering a lower body injury that kept him out for the remainder of the playoffs.

On June 23, 2017, Eaves opted to give up his impending free agent status to sign a three-year, $9.45 million contract to remain with the Ducks. On February 19, 2019, the Ducks placed Eaves on waivers.

== Personal life ==
Eaves was born in Calgary, spent some years in Blackwood, New Jersey, and grew up in Faribault, Minnesota. He is the son of former Calgary Flames and Minnesota North Stars player Mike Eaves, formerly the head coach of the University of Wisconsin–Madison's men's hockey team and head coach of the Columbus Blue Jackets' American Hockey League affiliate Cleveland Monsters, who coached Patrick at the 2004 World Juniors.

Eaves met his wife Katie in Chicago in 2007 while driving home to Minnesota after his Ottawa Senators lost the 2007 Stanley Cup Finals. They married in 2009 and have two daughters born in 2010 and 2012, and a son born in 2013. The family also has a Newfoundland dog named Reuben, an occasional visitor to Joe Louis Arena during Eaves' time with Detroit.

On October 23, 2017, after experiencing trouble breathing and weakness in his legs, Eaves was initially diagnosed with Guillain–Barré syndrome, an autoimmune nervous disorder. However, when he visited a Guillain–Barré specialist, it was determined he did not have GB, but something else entirely. Eaves went to numerous doctors and physical therapists and eventually regained strength in his limbs and lungs. The eventual diagnosis was post-viral syndrome.

== Career statistics ==
=== Regular season and playoffs ===
| | | | Regular season | | | | | Playoffs |
| Season | Team | League | GP | G | A | Pts | PIM | GP | G | A | Pts | PIM |
|---|---|---|---|---|---|---|---|---|---|---|---|---|
| 1999–00 | Shattuck–Saint Mary's | HSMN | 50 | 23 | 24 | 47 | — | — | — | — | — | — |
| 2000–01 | US NTDP U18 | USDP | 13 | 7 | 8 | 15 | — | — | — | — | — | — |
| 2000–01 | US NTDP U18 | NAHL | 34 | 12 | 11 | 23 | 75 | — | — | — | — | — |
| 2001–02 | US NTDP U18 | USDP | 32 | 19 | 21 | 40 | 87 | — | — | — | — | — |
| 2001–02 | US NTDP Juniors | USHL | 9 | 1 | 4 | 5 | 18 | — | — | — | — | — |
| 2001–02 | US NTDP U18 | NAHL | 8 | 5 | 3 | 8 | 37 | — | — | — | — | — |
| 2002–03 | Boston College | HE | 14 | 10 | 8 | 18 | 61 | — | — | — | — | — |
| 2003–04 | Boston College | HE | 34 | 18 | 23 | 41 | 66 | — | — | — | — | — |
| 2004–05 | Boston College | HE | 36 | 19 | 29 | 48 | 36 | — | — | — | — | — |
| 2005–06 | Binghamton Senators | AHL | 18 | 5 | 8 | 13 | 10 | — | — | — | — | — |
| 2005–06 | Ottawa Senators | NHL | 58 | 20 | 9 | 29 | 22 | 10 | 1 | 0 | 1 | 10 |
| 2006–07 | Ottawa Senators | NHL | 73 | 14 | 18 | 32 | 36 | 7 | 0 | 2 | 2 | 2 |
| 2007–08 | Ottawa Senators | NHL | 26 | 4 | 6 | 10 | 6 | — | — | — | — | — |
| 2007–08 | Carolina Hurricanes | NHL | 11 | 1 | 4 | 5 | 4 | — | — | — | — | — |
| 2008–09 | Carolina Hurricanes | NHL | 74 | 6 | 8 | 14 | 31 | 18 | 1 | 2 | 3 | 13 |
| 2009–10 | Detroit Red Wings | NHL | 65 | 12 | 10 | 22 | 26 | 8 | 0 | 0 | 0 | 2 |
| 2010–11 | Detroit Red Wings | NHL | 63 | 13 | 7 | 20 | 14 | 11 | 3 | 1 | 4 | 6 |
| 2011–12 | Detroit Red Wings | NHL | 10 | 0 | 1 | 1 | 2 | — | — | — | — | — |
| 2012–13 | Detroit Red Wings | NHL | 34 | 2 | 6 | 8 | 4 | 13 | 1 | 2 | 3 | 4 |
| 2013–14 | Detroit Red Wings | NHL | 25 | 2 | 3 | 5 | 2 | — | — | — | — | — |
| 2013–14 | Grand Rapids Griffins | AHL | 8 | 4 | 2 | 6 | 8 | — | — | — | — | — |
| 2013–14 | Nashville Predators | NHL | 5 | 0 | 0 | 0 | 0 | — | — | — | — | — |
| 2014–15 | Dallas Stars | NHL | 47 | 14 | 13 | 27 | 8 | — | — | — | — | — |
| 2015–16 | Dallas Stars | NHL | 54 | 11 | 6 | 17 | 27 | 9 | 3 | 3 | 6 | 2 |
| 2016–17 | Dallas Stars | NHL | 59 | 21 | 16 | 37 | 16 | — | — | — | — | — |
| 2016–17 | Anaheim Ducks | NHL | 20 | 11 | 3 | 14 | 8 | 7 | 2 | 2 | 4 | 6 |
| 2017–18 | Anaheim Ducks | NHL | 2 | 1 | 0 | 1 | 0 | — | — | — | — | — |
| 2018–19 | Anaheim Ducks | NHL | 7 | 0 | 0 | 0 | 4 | — | — | — | — | — |
| 2018–19 | San Diego Gulls | AHL | 7 | 0 | 2 | 2 | 0 | — | — | — | — | — |
| NHL totals | | | 633 | 132 | 110 | 242 | 210 | 83 | 11 | 12 | 23 | 45 |

=== International ===
Medal record

Representing United States

Ice hockey

World Junior Championships
| Gold medal – first place | 2004 Helsinki | |

| Year | Team | Event | Result | GP | G | A | Pts | PIM |
|---|---|---|---|---|---|---|---|---|
| 2002 | United States | U18 | 1st place, gold medalist(s) | 8 | 4 | 8 | 12 | 45 |
| 2004 | United States | WJC | 1st place, gold medalist(s) | 6 | 1 | 5 | 6 | 8 |
| Junior totals | | | | 14 | 5 | 13 | 18 | 53 |

== Awards and honors ==
| Award | Year |
|---|---|
| All-Hockey East Second Team | 2003–04 |
| AHCA East Second-Team All-American | 2003–04 |
| All-Hockey East First Team | 2004–05 |
| Hockey East Itech "Three Stars" Award | 2004–05 |
| Hockey East Player of the Year | 2004–05 |
| AHCA East First-Team All-American | 2004–05 |
| NHL YoungStars Game | 2006–07 |

Awards and achievements
| Preceded by Steve Saviano | Hockey East Player of the Year; 2004–05 | Succeeded by Chris Collins |
| Preceded by Keni Gibson | Hockey East Three-Stars Award; 2004–05 (Shared With Ryan Shannon) | Succeeded by Chris Collins / Cory Schneider |
| Preceded by Jakub Klepiš | Ottawa Senators first-round draft pick 2003 | Succeeded by Andrej Meszároš |
