= Ryan Shannon =

American ice hockey player (born 1983)

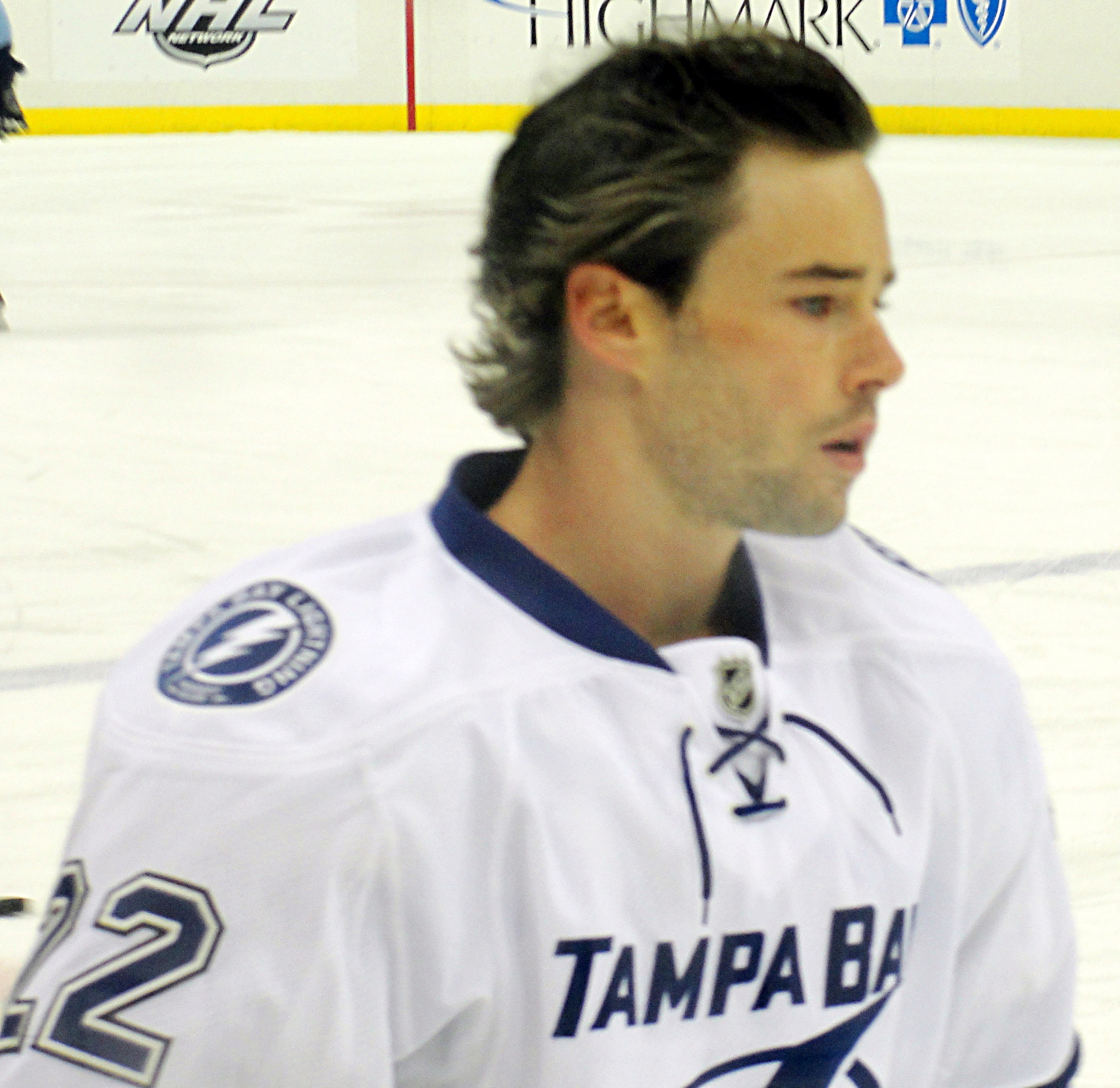
- Shannon with the Tampa Bay Lightning in 2012
- Born: March 2, 1983 (age 43) Darien, Connecticut, U.S.
- Height: 5 ft 9 in (175 cm)
- Weight: 175 lb (79 kg; 12 st 7 lb)
- Position: Center
- Shot: Right
- Played for: Anaheim Ducks; Vancouver Canucks; Ottawa Senators; Tampa Bay Lightning; ZSC Lions
- National team: United States
- NHL draft: Undrafted
- Playing career: 2005–2017

Ryan Patrick Shannon (born March 2, 1983) is an American former professional ice hockey player, who played in the National Hockey League (NHL). He is currently serving as the head coach of the boys varsity ice hockey team at the Taft School.

== Playing career ==
=== College ===
Shannon was raised in Darien, Connecticut, and he played youth hockey with the Darien Youth Hockey Association (DYHA). He played in the 1996 Quebec International Pee-Wee Hockey Tournament with the Connecticut Yankees minor ice hockey team.

After four years of high school hockey at The Taft School in Watertown, Connecticut, Shannon began college hockey with Boston College in 2001–02. In his freshman year, he received the team's Bernie Burke Award as top rookie after recording 25 points in 38 games. In his senior year, Boston captured the Hockey East championship (The Lamoriello Trophy) and Shannon was named to the Hockey East All-Conference First Team and the All-American East Second Team for the second consecutive season. Scoring 45 points, he earned team MVP honors with two other teammates. Internationally, Shannon represented the U.S. at the 2003 World Junior Championships in his sophomore year.

=== Professional ===
Undrafted, Shannon was signed as a free agent by the Mighty Ducks of Anaheim on April 3, 2005. He played for their American Hockey League (AHL) affiliate, the Portland Pirates, in 2005–06 and immediately began an eight-game scoring streak to begin the season. Midway through the season, he participated in the 2006 AHL All-Star Classic for Planet USA and won the fastest skater competition. Finishing his AHL rookie campaign with 86 points in 71 games — ninth overall in league scoring and second among rookies to Patrick O'Sullivan — he was named to the All-Rookie Team. Shannon added 22 points in 19 playoff games as Portland was eliminated in the seventh game of the Calder Cup semi-finals.

The following season, Shannon made his NHL debut, cracking the Ducks' 2006–07 roster. He scored his first NHL goal on October 22, 2006 in a shootout win against the Los Angeles Kings, finishing his NHL rookie season with 11 points in 53 games. He then dressed for 11 playoff games as part of the Ducks' 2007 Stanley Cup-winning squad.

That summer, Shannon was traded to the Vancouver Canucks on June 23, 2007, in exchange for Jason King and a conditional pick in 2009. He made the Canucks' roster out of training camp, but was sent down to the Manitoba Moose of the AHL after several games. Shannon was later called up and played 27 games total for the Canucks in 2007–08, recording 13 points. On July 23, 2008, it was announced that Shannon had re-signed with the Canucks.

A little more than a month later, on September 2, Shannon was traded to the Ottawa Senators for defenseman Lawrence Nycholat.

Shannon started the 2008–09 season in the minors with the Binghamton Senators. When Binghamton's coach, Cory Clouston, was elevated to the Ottawa job, he promoted Shannon to the Senators. He scored NHL career-highs in goals, assists and points in only 35 games and was re-signed immediately after the season to a one-year, one-way contract to stay with Ottawa for 2009–10.

On July 7, 2011, Shannon signed a one-year contract with the Tampa Bay Lightning as an unrestricted free agent. Shannon remained with the Lightning for the duration of the 2011–12 season, although failed to establish a regular role with the team, scoring 12 points in 45 games.

On May 22, 2012, without the offer of a new contract with the Lightning before free agency, Shannon signed a three-year deal with Swiss NLA team, ZSC Lions. He won the Swiss championship with the Lions in 2014. In January 2015, he inked a new deal with the Lions, that will keep him in Zurich until the end of the 2016-17 season.

== Coaching career ==
On February 16, 2017, The Taft School, Shannon's Alma Mater, announced that he would be the school's next Head Hockey Coach, succeeding Daniel Murphy.

== International play ==
Shannon was named to Team USA for the 2009 World Championships in Switzerland by his former general manager in Anaheim, Brian Burke. He was also named to Team USA for the 2011 World Championships in Slovakia.

== Career statistics ==
=== Regular season and playoffs ===
			Regular season					Playoffs
Season	Team	League	GP	G	A	Pts	PIM	GP	G	A	Pts	PIM
2001–02	Boston College	HE	38	8	17	25	12	—	—	—	—	—
2002–03	Boston College	HE	36	14	24	38	4	—	—	—	—	—
2003–04	Boston College	HE	42	15	27	42	22	—	—	—	—	—
2004–05	Boston College	HE	38	14	31	45	22	—	—	—	—	—
2004–05	Cincinnati Mighty Ducks	AHL	4	1	0	1	2	—	—	—	—	—
2005–06	Portland Pirates	AHL	71	27	59	86	44	19	11	11	22	8
2006–07	Portland Pirates	AHL	14	2	7	9	12	—	—	—	—	—
2006–07	Anaheim Ducks	NHL	53	2	9	11	10	11	0	0	0	6
2007–08	Manitoba Moose	AHL	13	1	7	8	10	—	—	—	—	—
2007–08	Vancouver Canucks	NHL	27	5	8	13	36	—	—	—	—	—
2008–09	Binghamton Senators	AHL	36	10	25	35	16	—	—	—	—	—
2008–09	Ottawa Senators	NHL	35	8	12	20	2	—	—	—	—	—
2009–10	Ottawa Senators	NHL	66	5	11	16	20	2	0	0	0	0
2010–11	Ottawa Senators	NHL	79	11	16	27	24	—	—	—	—	—
2011–12	Tampa Bay Lightning	NHL	45	4	8	12	10	—	—	—	—	—
2012–13	ZSC Lions	NLA	42	12	22	34	26	12	2	5	7	2
2013–14	ZSC Lions	NLA	49	7	23	30	24	18	5	7	12	2
2014–15	ZSC Lions	NLA	49	10	25	35	18	18	5	4	9	6
2015–16	ZSC Lions	NLA	42	9	26	35	6	3	1	0	1	0
2016–17	ZSC Lions	NLA	40	8	15	23	10	6	0	1	1	0
NHL totals			305	35	64	99	90	13	0	0	0	6

=== International ===
Year	Team	Event	Result	GP	G	A	Pts	PIM
2003	United States	WJC	4th	7	0	2	2	4
2009	United States	WC	4th	9	0	3	3	2
2011	United States	WC	8th	7	1	3	4	0
Junior totals				7	0	2	2	4
Senior totals				16	1	6	7	2

== Awards and honors ==
Award	Year
All-Hockey East First Team	2003–04; 2004–05
AHCA East Second-Team All-American	2003–04; 2004–05
Lamoriello Trophy	2005
AHL Rookie of the Month - October	2005
AHL All-Star Classic	2006
AHL All-Rookie Team	2006
NHL Stanley Cup (Anaheim Ducks)	2007
NLA Championship (ZSC Lions)	2014

== Transactions ==
- April 3, 2005 – signed by the Mighty Ducks of Anaheim as a free agent
- June 23, 2007 – traded to the Vancouver Canucks for Jason King and a conditional pick in 2009
- July 23, 2008 – re-signed by the Vancouver Canucks
- September 2, 2008 - Traded to the Ottawa Senators for Lawrence Nycholat
- April 15, 2009 – re-signed by the Ottawa Senators to a one-year contract.
- July 7, 2011 – signed by the Tampa Bay Lightning as a free agent to a one-year contract.
- May 22, 2012 – signed by the ZSC Lions to a three-year contract.
- February 16, 2017 – announced retirement

Awards and achievements
Preceded by Keni Gibson	Hockey East Three-Stars Award; 2004–05 (with Patrick Eaves)	Succeeded by Chris Collins / Cory Schneider
Preceded by Ben Eaves	Hockey East Scoring Champion; 2003–04 (with Tony Voce)	Succeeded by Jason Guerriero
