= Jason King (ice hockey) =

Canadian ice hockey player and executive

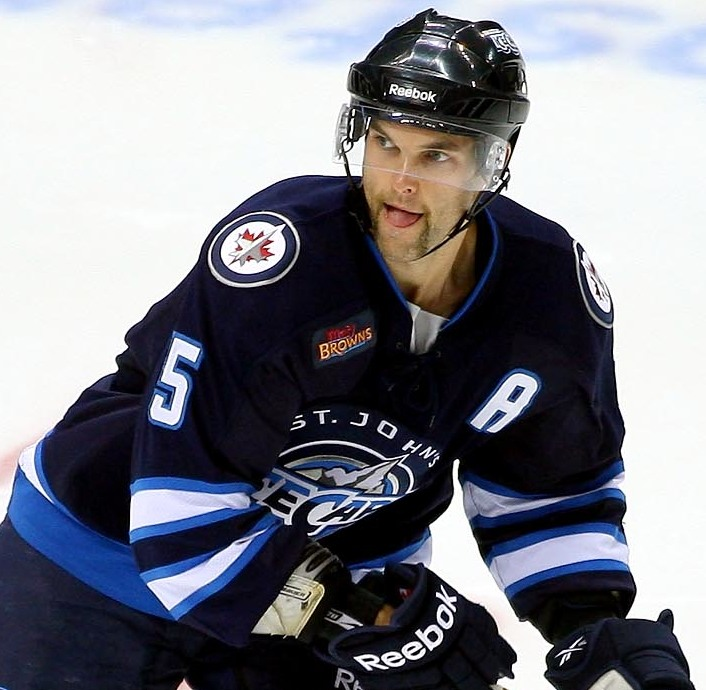
- King with the St. John's IceCaps in 2011
- Born: September 14, 1981 (age 44) Corner Brook, Newfoundland, Canada
- Height: 6 ft 1 in (185 cm)
- Weight: 195 lb (88 kg; 13 st 13 lb)
- Position: Centre
- Shot: Left
- Played for: Vancouver Canucks; Skellefteå AIK; Anaheim Ducks; Adler Mannheim; Hamburg Freezers
- NHL draft: 212th overall, 2001; Vancouver Canucks
- Playing career: 2003–2013

Jason King (born September 14, 1981) is a Canadian professional ice hockey coach and former player. King is currently an assistant coach of the Minnesota Wild of the National Hockey League (NHL).

== Playing career ==
King was drafted by the Vancouver Canucks of the National Hockey League in the seventh round (212th overall) of the 2001 Entry Draft, after having played 3 seasons for the Halifax Mooseheads of the QMJHL. He found some success playing with twin brothers Henrik and Daniel Sedin in his first full season with the team, registering 12 goals in 2003–04, the bulk of which came in the team's first few games. This led him to being awarded the NHL Rookie of the Month award for the month of November. The line quickly earned the nickname "The Mattress Line," due to its members figuratively composing "two twins and a king." He spent the 2004–05 season playing for Vancouver's then-AHL affiliates, the Manitoba Moose, where he suffered a serious concussion - one that took him many months to recover from.

After refusing to sign the Canucks' qualifying offer for the 2006–07 season, King opted to play for Skellefteå AIK in the Swedish elite league Elitserien. His rights were traded to the Anaheim Ducks on June 23, 2007, in exchange for Ryan Shannon. In the 2007–08 season, King made his return to the NHL playing in four games with the Ducks although he primarily played for their affiliate, the Portland Pirates, of the AHL.

King went back to Europe in 2008 and played three seasons in the German elite league, one with Adler Mannheim and two with the Hamburg Freezers. After returning from Germany, King played two seasons with the St. John's IceCaps, the minor league affiliate of the Winnipeg Jets.

== Coaching career ==
King announced his retirement as a player in August 2013 and was subsequently hired by the IceCaps as an assistant coach. After two years in the job, he was named Director of Hockey Operations. He returned to an assistant coach role after one season upon the Canucks moving their AHL affiliate, to the Utica Comets. On December 23, 2020, King was promoted to work as an assistant coach on the Canucks' coaching staff for the 2020–21 NHL season. After being let go by the Canucks at the end of the 2022–23 NHL season, King was hired by the Minnesota Wild on July 1, 2023 to serve as an assistant coach.

== Career statistics ==
			Regular season					Playoffs
Season	Team	League	GP	G	A	Pts	PIM	GP	G	A	Pts	PIM
1999–2000	Halifax Mooseheads	QMJHL	53	3	7	10	8	10	0	0	0	2
2000–01	Halifax Mooseheads	QMJHL	72	48	41	89	78	6	3	2	5	16
2001–02	Halifax Mooseheads	QMJHL	61	63	36	99	39	13	9	8	17	13
2002–03	Manitoba Moose	AHL	67	20	20	40	15	14	4	3	7	14
2002–03	Vancouver Canucks	NHL	8	0	2	2	0	—	—	—	—	—
2003–04	Manitoba Moose	AHL	29	12	11	23	6	—	—	—	—	—
2003–04	Vancouver Canucks	NHL	47	12	9	21	8	1	0	0	0	0
2004–05	Manitoba Moose	AHL	59	26	27	53	22	—	—	—	—	—
2005–06	Manitoba Moose	AHL	36	19	14	33	34	13	3	4	7	8
2006–07	Skellefteå AIK	SEL	55	15	4	19	20	—	—	—	—	—
2007–08	Portland Pirates	AHL	65	29	30	59	42	13	6	3	9	12
2007–08	Anaheim Ducks	NHL	4	0	0	0	0	—	—	—	—	—
2008–09	Adler Mannheim	DEL	37	7	10	17	70	7	3	1	4	2
2009–10	Hamburg Freezers	DEL	53	25	23	48	42	—	—	—	—	—
2010–11	Hamburg Freezers	DEL	50	16	13	29	22	—	—	—	—	—
2011–12	St. John's IceCaps	AHL	70	22	19	41	34	15	2	2	4	13
2012–13	St. John's IceCaps	AHL	9	1	3	4	6	—	—	—	—	—
AHL totals			335	129	124	253	159	55	15	12	27	47
NHL totals			59	12	11	23	8	1	0	0	0	0
DEL totals			140	48	46	94	134	7	3	1	4	2

== Awards and honours ==
Award	Year
QMJHL
Second All-Star Team	2001
Most goals (63)	2002
AHL
All-Star Game	2005
